= List of named minor planets: 200000–249999 =

This is a partial list of named minor planets in numerical order. It contains a total of 717 entries as of 9 November 2026. Minor planets for which no article exist are displayed in grey color and redirect to the list of minor planets (see List of minor planets § Main index).

== From 200,000 to 249,999 ==
- 200000 Danielparrott
- 200002 Hehe
- 200003 Aokeda
- 200020 Cadi Ayyad
- 200025 Cloud Gate
- 200031 Romainmontaigut
- 200033 Newtaipei
- 200052 Sinigaglia
- 200069 Alastor
- 200234 Kumashiro
- 200255 Weigle
- 200578 Yungchuen
- 200750 Rix
- 201019 Oliverwhite
- 201023 Karlwhittenburg
- 201204 Stevewilliams
- 201308 Hansgrade
- 201372 Sheldon
- 201497 Marcelroche
- 201511 Ferreret
- 201751 Steinhardt
- 201777 Deronda
- 201935 Robertbraun
- 202092 Algirdas
- 202093 Jogaila
- 202373 Ubuntu
- 202505 Farhang
- 202599 Harkányi
- 202605 Shenchunshan
- 202614 Kayleigh
- 202686 Birkfellner
- 202704 Utena
- 202736 Julietclare
- 202740 Vicsympho
- 202750 Christophertonge
- 202778 Dmytria
- 202784 Gangkeda
- 202787 Kestecher
- 202790 Babits
- 202806 Sierrastars
- 202819 Carlosánchez
- 202907 Meisenheimer
- 202909 Jakoten
- 202930 Ivezić
- 203602 Danjoyce
- 203773 Magyarics
- 203823 Zdanavičius
- 204370 Ferdinandvaněk
- 204570 Veronicabray
- 204602 Lawrencebrown
- 204632 Jamesburch
- 204702 Péquignat
- 204705 Pagan
- 204710 Gaoxing
- 204711 Luojialun
- 204764 Lindaburke
- 204786 Wehlau
- 204805 Šipöcz
- 204816 Andreacamilleri
- 204831 Levski
- 204836 Xiexiaosi
- 204839 Suzhouyuanlin
- 204842 Fengchia
- 204852 Frankfurt
- 204873 FAIR
- 204896 Giorgiobocca
- 205424 Bibracte
- 205599 Walkowicz
- 205698 Troiani
- 205823 Michaeldavis
- 206015 Carlengelbrecht
- 206185 Yip
- 206241 Dubois
- 206265 Radian
- 206574 Illyés
- 207013 Fischetti
- 207109 Stürmenchopf
- 207319 Eugenemar
- 207321 Crawshaw
- 207341 Isabelmartin
- 207385 Maxou
- 207394 Rickfitzgerald
- 207420 Jehin
- 207481 Kékes
- 207504 Markusovszky
- 207547 Charito
- 207563 Toscana
- 207585 Lubar
- 207603 Liuchaohan
- 207653 Anatolymokrenko
- 207655 Kerboguan
- 207657 Mangiantini
- 207661 Hehuanshan
- 207666 Habibula
- 207681 Caiqiao
- 207687 Senckenberg
- 207695 Olgakopyl
- 207715 Muqinshuijiao
- 207716 Wangxichan
- 207717 Sa'a
- 207723 Jiansanjiang
- 207754 Stathiskafalis
- 207763 Oberursel
- 207809 Wuzuze
- 207883 Jeffreytonge
- 207899 Grinmalia
- 207901 Tzecmaun
- 207931 Weihai
- 208117 Davidgerdes
- 208196 Matthiashahn
- 208351 Sielmann
- 208425 Zehavi
- 208499 Shokasonjuku
- 208663 Xuxiyuan
- 208664 Koojunyup
- 208915 Andrewashcraft
- 208916 Robertcaldwell
- 208917 Traviscarter
- 208996 Achlys
- 209054 Lombkató
- 209075 Kathleenharmon
- 209083 Rioja
- 209089 Csépevaléria
- 209107 Šafránek
- 209148 Dustindeford
- 209149 Chrismackenzie
- 209206 Richardhenry
- 209209 Ericmarsh
- 209255 Myotragus
- 209374 Sabil
- 209540 Siurana
- 209552 Isaacroberts
- 209791 Tokaj
- 209883 Jasonhofgartner
- 210030 Taoyuan
- 210031 Grupamocarta
- 210032 Enricocastellani
- 210035 Jungli
- 210070 Robertcapa
- 210107 Pistoletto
- 210147 Žalgiris
- 210174 Vossenkuhl
- 210182 Mazzini
- 210210 Songjian
- 210213 Hasler-Gloor
- 210230 Linyuanpei
- 210231 Wangdemin
- 210232 Zhangjinqiu
- 210245 Castets
- 210271 Samarkand
- 210290 Borsellino
- 210292 Mayongsheng
- 210294 Vidal
- 210345 Barbon
- 210350 Mariolisa
- 210414 Gebartolomei
- 210421 Freundtamás
- 210425 Imogene
- 210432 Dietmarhopp
- 210433 Ullithiele
- 210434 Fungyuancheng
- 210435 Pollackmihály
- 210444 Frithjof
- 210532 Grantmckee
- 210533 Seanmisner
- 210686 Scottnorris
- 210854 Stevejaskulek
- 210874 Perijohnson
- 210939 Bödök
- 210983 Wadeparker
- 210997 Guenat
- 211021 Johnpercin
- 211077 Hongkang
- 211106 Francinewetzel
- 211172 Tarantola
- 211232 Kellykevin
- 211343 Dieterhusar
- 211374 Anthonyrose
- 211375 Jessesteed
- 211376 Joethurston
- 211377 Travisturbyfill
- 211378 Williamwarneke
- 211379 Claytonwhitted
- 211380 Kevinwoyjeck
- 211381 Garretzuppiger
- 211473 Herin
- 211613 Christophelovis
- 211977 Springob
- 212073 Carlzimmer
- 212121 Marthegautier
- 212176 Fabriziospaziani
- 212215 Mallorykinczyk
- 212373 Pietrocascella
- 212374 Vellerat
- 212392 Peterkollmann
- 212403 Marthakusterer
- 212465 Goroshky
- 212500 Robertojoppolo
- 212501 Deniserichards
- 212587 Bartašiūtė
- 212606 Janulis
- 212631 Hsinchu
- 212692 Lazauskaitė
- 212705 Friûl
- 212723 Klitschko
- 212795 Fangjiancheng
- 212796 Guoyonghuai
- 212797 Lipei
- 212924 Yurishevchuk
- 212929 Satovski
- 212977 Birutė
- 212981 Majalitović
- 212991 Garcíalorca
- 212998 Tolbachik
- 213197 Lessac-Chenen
- 213255 Kimiyayui
- 213269 Angelbarbero
- 213629 Binford
- 213636 Gajdoš
- 213637 Lemarchal
- 213770 Fignon
- 213771 Johndee
- 213772 Blaheta
- 213775 Zdeněkdostál
- 213800 Stefanwul
- 214081 Balavoine
- 214136 Alinghi
- 214180 Mabaglioni
- 214290 Leeannmarshall
- 214378 Kleinmann
- 214432 Belprahon
- 214474 Long Island
- 214475 Chrisbayus
- 214476 Stephencolbert
- 214485 Dupouy
- 214487 Baranivka
- 214558 Korányi
- 214678 Slavėnas
- 214715 Silvanofuso
- 214719 Louges
- 214772 UNICEF
- 214819 Gianotti
- 214820 Faustocoppi
- 214863 Seiradakis
- 214883 Yuanxikun
- 214911 Viehböck
- 214928 Carrara
- 214953 Giugavazzi
- 215016 Catherinegriffin
- 215021 Fanjingshan
- 215023 Huangjiqing
- 215044 Joãoalves
- 215080 Kaohsiung
- 215089 Hermanfrid
- 215423 Winnecke
- 215458 Yucun
- 215463 Jobse
- 215592 Normarose
- 215685 Cherylalexander
- 215809 Hugoschwarz
- 215841 Čimelice
- 215868 Rohrer
- 215884 Jayantmurthy
- 215886 Barryarnold
- 215905 Andrewpoppe
- 215970 Campidoglio
- 216023 DaBoll
- 216164 Simonkrughoff
- 216194 Újvárosy
- 216241 Renzopiano
- 216261 Mapihsia
- 216295 Menorca
- 216319 Sanxia
- 216331 Panjunhua
- 216343 Wenchang
- 216345 Savigliano
- 216368 Hypnomys
- 216390 Binnig
- 216428 Mauricio
- 216433 Milianleo
- 216439 Lyubertsy
- 216446 Nanshida
- 216451 Irsha
- 216462 Polyphontes
- 216591 Coetzee
- 216624 Kaufer
- 216752 Kirbyrunyon
- 216757 Vasari
- 216780 Lilianne
- 216808 Tolmárgyula
- 216888 Sankovich
- 216893 Navina
- 216897 Golubev
- 216910 Vnukov
- 217124 Michaelsalinas
- 217257 Valemangano
- 217366 Mayalin
- 217398 Tihany
- 217420 Olevsk
- 217472 Addams
- 217492 Howardtaylor
- 217510 Dewaldroode
- 217576 Klausbirkner
- 217603 Grove Creek
- 217628 Lugh
- 217726 Kitabeppu
- 218069 Lisaturner
- 218087 Kaniansky
- 218097 Maoxianxin
- 218268 Pierremariepelé
- 218274 Albertferenc
- 218400 Marquardt
- 218570 Jonvandegriff
- 218636 Calabria
- 218679 Sagamorehill
- 218692 Leesnyder
- 218752 Tentlingen
- 218866 Alexantioch
- 218900 Gabybuchholz
- 218901 Gerdbuchholz
- 218914 Tangauchin
- 218987 Heidenhain
- 218998 Navi
- 219008 Igazantal
- 219067 Bossuet
- 219286 Helenewinters
- 219861 Robertdecker
- 219983 Yangtongyu
- 220229 Hegedüs
- 220331 Stevenarnold
- 220346 Nedabehrooz
- 220418 Golovyno
- 220444 Pontusbrandt
- 220495 Margarethe
- 220736 Niihama
- 220886 Lauren-Yuill
- 221019 Raine
- 221026 Jeancoester
- 221073 Ovruch
- 221149 Cindyfoote
- 221150 Jerryfoote
- 221230 Sanaloria
- 221454 Mayerlambert
- 221465 Rapa Nui
- 221516 Bergen-Enkheim
- 221528 Kosztolányi
- 221529 Tamkósirató
- 221566 Omarcustodio
- 221628 Hyatt
- 221673 Duschl
- 221698 Juliusolsen
- 221712 Moléson
- 221769 Cima Rest
- 221853 Gábrisgyula
- 221908 Agastrophus
- 221917 Opites
- 221923 Jayeff
- 222032 Lupton
- 222249 Itsuki
- 222403 Bethchristie
- 222812 Priyadharmavaram
- 222903 Rajanidhingra
- 223263 Cheikhoumardia
- 223278 Brianduncan
- 223339 Gregdunn
- 223360 Švankmajer
- 223566 Petignat
- 223633 Rosnyaîné
- 223685 Hartopp
- 223877 Kutler
- 223879 Anthonyegan
- 223912 Jacobeisig
- 223950 Mississauga
- 224027 Grégoire
- 224067 Colemila
- 224206 Pietchisson
- 224591 Fattig
- 224592 Carnac
- 224617 Micromégas
- 224693 Morganfreeman
- 224831 Neeffisis
- 224858 Kunmária
- 224888 Cochingchu
- 224962 Michaelgrünewald
- 225033 Maskoliūnas
- 225076 Vallemare
- 225088 Gonggong
- 225096 Kovácsgéza
- 225225 Ninagrünewald
- 225231 Orhazoltán
- 225232 Kircheva
- 225238 Hristobotev
- 225239 Ruthproell
- 225250 Georgfranziska
- 225254 Flury
- 225276 Leïtos
- 225277 Stino
- 225321 Stevenkoenig
- 225438 Jacobfirer
- 225711 Danyzy
- 225991 Françoisforget
- 226356 Madelinefosbury
- 226672 Kučinskas
- 226858 Ivanpuluj
- 226861 Elimaor
- 227033 Adamjmckay
- 227065 Romandia
- 227147 Coggiajérôme
- 227151 Desargues
- 227152 Zupi
- 227218 Rényi
- 227310 Scottkardel
- 227326 Narodychi
- 227427 Williamwren
- 227641 Nothomb
- 227711 Dailyminorplanet
- 227767 Enkibilal
- 227770 Wischnewski
- 227928 Ludoferrière
- 227930 Athos
- 227962 Aramis
- 227997 NIGLAS
- 228029 MANIAC
- 228078 Cavalloni
- 228110 Eudorus
- 228133 Ripoll
- 228135 Sodnik
- 228136 Billary
- 228147 Miquelbarceló
- 228158 Mamankei
- 228165 Mezentsev
- 228180 Puertollano
- 228409 Bobjensen
- 228633 Stevegribbin
- 228883 Cliffsimak
- 228893 Gerevich
- 228980 Robertstrain
- 229004 Josephhall
- 229198 Zofiahuppenthal
- 229214 Magdasaina
- 229255 Andrewelliott
- 229280 Sica
- 229425 Grosspointner
- 229440 Filimon
- 229614 Womack
- 229631 Cluny
- 229723 Marcoludwig
- 229737 Porthos
- 229762 Gǃkúnǁʼhòmdímà
- 229777 ENIAC
- 229781 Arthurmcdonald
- 229836 Wladimarinello
- 229864 Sichouzhilu
- 229900 Emmagreaves
- 230151 Vachier
- 230155 Francksallet
- 230415 Matthiasjung
- 230434 Johnhanley
- 230631 Justino
- 230648 Zikmund
- 230656 Kovácspál
- 230667 Janmlynář
- 230691 Van Vogt
- 230728 Tedstryk
- 230736 Jalyhome
- 230759 Anishahosadurga
- 230765 Alfbester
- 230975 Rogerfederer
- 231040 Kakaras
- 231042 Johnhayes
- 231265 Saulperlmutter
- 231278 Kárpáti
- 231307 Peterfalk
- 231346 Taofanlin
- 231368 Hunfalvy
- 231379 Jonhandiboe
- 231446 Dayao
- 231470 Bedding
- 231486 Capefearrock
- 231555 Christianeurda
- 231571 Tubolyvince
- 231609 Sarcander
- 231649 Korotkiy
- 231666 Aisymnos
- 231675 Amandastadermann
- 231832 Briankeeney
- 231841 Danielkatz
- 231842 Graemekeleher
- 231969 Sebvauclair
- 232233 Taihu
- 232259 Georgelawrence
- 232306 Bekuška
- 232363 Jeanettethorn
- 232409 Dubes
- 232553 Randypeterson
- 232763 Eliewiesel
- 232868 Salmasylla
- 232923 Adalovelace
- 232949 Muhina
- 233214 Gailoxton
- 233292 Brianschmidt
- 233383 Assisneto
- 233459 Gregquicke
- 233472 Moorcroft
- 233486 Thankároly
- 233488 Cosandey
- 233522 Moye
- 233544 Jinyaqiu
- 233547 Luxun
- 233559 Pizzetti
- 233583 Karafiáth
- 233653 Rether
- 233661 Alytus
- 233707 Alfons
- 233880 Urbanpriol
- 233893 Honthyhanna
- 233943 Falera
- 233967 Vierkant
- 234026 Unioneastrofili
- 234292 Wolfganghansch
- 234294 Pappsándor
- 234750 Amymainzer
- 234761 Rainerkracht
- 234923 Bonnell
- 235027 Pommard
- 235145 Ericquirico
- 235201 Lorántffy
- 235403 Alysenregiec
- 235615 Rosromkondratyuk
- 235621 Kratochvíle
- 235750 Leahroberson
- 235837 Iota
- 235852 Theogeuens
- 235985 Dougrodgers
- 235990 Laennec
- 235999 Bucciantini
- 236111 Wolfgangbüttner
- 236129 Oysterbay
- 236170 Cholnoky
- 236232 Joshalbers
- 236305 Adamriess
- 236307 Berzsenyi
- 236463 Bretécher
- 236484 Luchijen
- 236616 Gray
- 236617 Loriglaze
- 236683 Hujingyao
- 236728 Leandri
- 236743 Zhejiangdaxue
- 236746 Chareslindos
- 236784 Livorno
- 236785 Hilendàrski
- 236788 Nanxinda
- 236800 Broder
- 236807 Eggen
- 236810 Rutten
- 236811 Natascharenate
- 236845 Houxianglin
- 236851 Chenchikwan
- 236909 Jakoberwin
- 236984 Astier
- 236987 Deustua
- 236988 Robberto
- 237164 Keelung
- 237187 Zhonglihe
- 237265 Golobokov
- 237276 Nakama
- 237277 Nevaruth
- 237397 Mccauleyrench
- 237693 Anakovacicek
- 237845 Neris
- 238129 Bernardwolfe
- 238593 Paysdegex
- 238710 Halassy
- 238771 Juhászbalázs
- 238817 Titeuf
- 239046 Judysyd
- 239071 Penghu
- 239105 Marcocattaneo
- 239126 Tommygreathouse
- 239200 Luoyang
- 239203 Simeon
- 239254 Gabbigriffith
- 239282 Kevinmccarron
- 239307 Kruchynenko
- 239593 Tianwenbang
- 239611 Likwohting
- 239645 Shandongas
- 239672 SOFIA
- 239675 Mottez
- 239716 Felixbaumgartner
- 239792 Hankakováčová
- 239890 Edudeldon
- 240021 Radzo
- 240022 Demitra
- 240364 Kozmutza
- 240381 Emilchyne
- 240697 Gemenc
- 240725 Scipioni
- 240757 Farkasberci
- 240871 MOSS
- 241090 Nemet
- 241113 Zhongda
- 241136 Sandstede
- 241153 Omegagigia
- 241192 Pulyny
- 241276 Guntramlampert
- 241362 Nesiotites
- 241363 Érdibálint
- 241364 Reneangelil
- 241368 Hildjózsef
- 241373 Richardmoissl
- 241418 Darmstadt
- 241442 Shandongkexie
- 241475 Martinagedeck
- 241509 Sessler
- 241527 Edwardwright
- 241528 Tubman
- 241529 Roccutri
- 241538 Chudniv
- 242235 Marieskálová
- 242321 Billtilden
- 242479 Marijampolė
- 242492 Fantomas
- 242516 Lindseystirling
- 242523 Kreszgéza
- 242529 Hilaomar
- 242648 Fribourg
- 242830 Richardwessling
- 243000 Katysirles
- 243002 Lemmy
- 243073 Freistetter
- 243094 Dirlewanger
- 243096 Klauswerner
- 243097 Batavia
- 243109 Hansludwig
- 243204 Kubanchoria
- 243262 Korkosz
- 243285 Fauvaud
- 243320 Jackuipers
- 243381 Alessio
- 243440 Colonia
- 243458 Bubulina
- 243491 Mühlviertel
- 243516 Marklarsen
- 243526 Russwalker
- 243529 Petereisenhardt
- 243536 Mannheim
- 243546 Fengchuanliu
- 243591 Ignacostantino
- 243637 Frosinone
- 244888 Bunton
- 244932 Méliès
- 245158 Thomasandrews
- 245417 Rostand
- 245877 Kvassay
- 245890 Krynychenka
- 245943 Davidjoseph
- 245983 Machholz
- 246132 Lugyny
- 246153 Waltermaria
- 246164 Zdvyzhensk
- 246167 Joskohn
- 246171 Konrad
- 246238 Crampton
- 246247 Sheldoncooper
- 246333 Williamdane
- 246345 Carolharris
- 246504 Hualien
- 246643 Miaoli
- 246759 Elviracheca
- 246789 Pattinson
- 246803 Martinezpatrick
- 246821 Satyarthi
- 246837 Bethfabinsky
- 246841 Williamirace
- 246842 Dutchstapelbroek
- 246861 Johnelwell
- 246913 Slocum
- 247341 Shaulladany
- 247542 Ripplrónai
- 247553 Berndpauli
- 247652 Hajossy
- 247821 Coignet
- 248183 Peisandros
- 248230 Sion
- 248262 Liuxiaobo
- 248321 Cester
- 248388 Namtso
- 248717 Ódryárpád
- 248750 Asteroidday
- 248839 Mažeikiai
- 248866 Margherita
- 248908 Ginostrada
- 248970 Giannimorandi
- 248993 Jonava
- 249010 Abdel-Samad
- 249044 Barrymarshall
- 249061 Antonyberger
- 249160 Urriellu
- 249300 Karenmortfield
- 249302 Ajoie
- 249514 Donaldroyer
- 249515 Heinrichsen
- 249516 Aretha
- 249519 Whitneyclavin
- 249520 Luppino
- 249521 Truth
- 249522 Johndailey
- 249523 Friedan
- 249530 Ericrice
- 249539 Pedrosevilla
- 249540 Eugeniescott
- 249541 Steinem
- 249542 Edwardyoung
- 249544 Ianmclean
- 249823 Delmarbarker
back to top

== See also ==
- List of minor planet discoverers
- List of observatory codes
- Meanings of minor planet names § Index
