= List of minor planets: 211001–212000 =

The following is a partial list of minor planets, running from minor-planet number 211001 through 212000, inclusive. The primary data for this and other partial lists is based on JPL's "Small-Body Orbital Elements" and data available from the Minor Planet Center. Critical list information is also provided by the MPC, unless otherwise specified from Lowell Observatory. A detailed description of the table's columns and additional sources are given on the main page including a complete list of every page in this series, and a statistical break-up on the dynamical classification of minor planets.

Also see the summary list of all named bodies in numerical and alphabetical order, and the corresponding naming citations for the number range of this particular list. New namings may only be added to this list after official publication, as the preannouncement of names is condemned by the Working Group for Small Bodies Nomenclature of the International Astronomical Union.

Near-Earth obj.	MBA (inner)	MBA (outer)	Centaur
Mars-crosser	MBA (middle)	Jupiter trojan	Trans-Neptunian obj.
Unclassified

== 211001–211100 ==
Designation			Discovery			Properties		Ref
Permanent	Provisional	Named after	Date	Site	Discoverer(s)	Category	Diam.	Ref
211001	2001 XD_{128}	—	December 14, 2001	Socorro	LINEAR	·	4.8 km	MPC · JPL
211002	2001 XT_{136}	—	December 14, 2001	Socorro	LINEAR	·	1.1 km	MPC · JPL
211003	2001 XQ_{155}	—	December 14, 2001	Socorro	LINEAR	·	800 m	MPC · JPL
211004	2001 XH_{171}	—	December 14, 2001	Socorro	LINEAR	·	2.2 km	MPC · JPL
211005	2001 XE_{181}	—	December 14, 2001	Socorro	LINEAR	·	1.1 km	MPC · JPL
211006	2001 XT_{181}	—	December 14, 2001	Socorro	LINEAR	·	1.3 km	MPC · JPL
211007	2001 XD_{182}	—	December 14, 2001	Socorro	LINEAR	·	1.1 km	MPC · JPL
211008	2001 XY_{205}	—	December 11, 2001	Socorro	LINEAR	·	4.6 km	MPC · JPL
211009	2001 XR_{245}	—	December 15, 2001	Socorro	LINEAR	THM	3.5 km	MPC · JPL
211010	2001 XE_{263}	—	December 14, 2001	Kitt Peak	Spacewatch	THM	3.3 km	MPC · JPL
211011	2001 YC_{12}	—	December 17, 2001	Socorro	LINEAR	THM	2.8 km	MPC · JPL
211012	2001 YS_{13}	—	December 17, 2001	Socorro	LINEAR	·	2.6 km	MPC · JPL
211013	2001 YK_{33}	—	December 18, 2001	Socorro	LINEAR	AGN	1.8 km	MPC · JPL
211014	2001 YH_{56}	—	December 18, 2001	Socorro	LINEAR	·	990 m	MPC · JPL
211015	2001 YM_{79}	—	December 18, 2001	Socorro	LINEAR	·	1.1 km	MPC · JPL
211016	2001 YL_{82}	—	December 18, 2001	Socorro	LINEAR	·	1.2 km	MPC · JPL
211017	2001 YR_{95}	—	December 18, 2001	Palomar	NEAT	·	1.1 km	MPC · JPL
211018	2001 YD_{99}	—	December 17, 2001	Socorro	LINEAR	·	3.7 km	MPC · JPL
211019	2001 YE_{153}	—	December 19, 2001	Anderson Mesa	LONEOS	·	4.7 km	MPC · JPL
211020	2001 YZ_{154}	—	December 20, 2001	Palomar	NEAT	·	4.5 km	MPC · JPL
211021 Johnpercin	2001 YC_{159}	Johnpercin	December 18, 2001	Apache Point	SDSS	·	970 m	MPC · JPL
211022	2002 AN_{15}	—	January 6, 2002	Socorro	LINEAR	·	5.3 km	MPC · JPL
211023	2002 AH_{21}	—	January 8, 2002	Socorro	LINEAR	·	1.1 km	MPC · JPL
211024	2002 AB_{31}	—	January 9, 2002	Socorro	LINEAR	·	880 m	MPC · JPL
211025	2002 AR_{32}	—	January 8, 2002	Palomar	NEAT	·	1.2 km	MPC · JPL
211026	2002 AV_{70}	—	January 8, 2002	Socorro	LINEAR	·	1.1 km	MPC · JPL
211027	2002 AX_{108}	—	January 9, 2002	Socorro	LINEAR	·	1.2 km	MPC · JPL
211028	2002 AS_{117}	—	January 9, 2002	Socorro	LINEAR	·	1.1 km	MPC · JPL
211029	2002 AE_{127}	—	January 13, 2002	Socorro	LINEAR	·	830 m	MPC · JPL
211030	2002 AO_{144}	—	January 13, 2002	Socorro	LINEAR	·	750 m	MPC · JPL
211031	2002 AC_{159}	—	January 13, 2002	Socorro	LINEAR	NYS	1.1 km	MPC · JPL
211032	2002 AK_{159}	—	January 13, 2002	Socorro	LINEAR	·	1.3 km	MPC · JPL
211033	2002 AH_{165}	—	January 13, 2002	Socorro	LINEAR	·	1.1 km	MPC · JPL
211034	2002 AZ_{181}	—	January 5, 2002	Palomar	NEAT	·	1.2 km	MPC · JPL
211035	2002 AJ_{183}	—	January 6, 2002	Anderson Mesa	LONEOS	·	4.9 km	MPC · JPL
211036	2002 BR_{14}	—	January 19, 2002	Socorro	LINEAR	·	1.1 km	MPC · JPL
211037	2002 BX_{27}	—	January 20, 2002	Anderson Mesa	LONEOS	·	1.0 km	MPC · JPL
211038	2002 CW_{10}	—	February 6, 2002	Socorro	LINEAR	PHO	1.6 km	MPC · JPL
211039	2002 CD_{12}	—	February 6, 2002	Socorro	LINEAR	PHO	1.4 km	MPC · JPL
211040	2002 CR_{19}	—	February 4, 2002	Palomar	NEAT	·	900 m	MPC · JPL
211041	2002 CN_{22}	—	February 5, 2002	Palomar	NEAT	·	1.1 km	MPC · JPL
211042	2002 CL_{25}	—	February 8, 2002	Socorro	LINEAR	·	1.9 km	MPC · JPL
211043	2002 CL_{34}	—	February 6, 2002	Socorro	LINEAR	·	1.1 km	MPC · JPL
211044	2002 CZ_{34}	—	February 6, 2002	Socorro	LINEAR	·	1.0 km	MPC · JPL
211045	2002 CE_{43}	—	February 12, 2002	Fountain Hills	C. W. Juels, P. R. Holvorcem	PHO	3.6 km	MPC · JPL
211046	2002 CU_{43}	—	February 8, 2002	Socorro	LINEAR	PHO	1.6 km	MPC · JPL
211047	2002 CX_{43}	—	February 10, 2002	Socorro	LINEAR	·	950 m	MPC · JPL
211048	2002 CD_{50}	—	February 3, 2002	Haleakala	NEAT	·	1.5 km	MPC · JPL
211049	2002 CY_{51}	—	February 12, 2002	Desert Eagle	W. K. Y. Yeung	·	1.2 km	MPC · JPL
211050	2002 CL_{52}	—	February 12, 2002	Desert Eagle	W. K. Y. Yeung	·	850 m	MPC · JPL
211051	2002 CP_{52}	—	February 12, 2002	Desert Eagle	W. K. Y. Yeung	NYS	2.2 km	MPC · JPL
211052	2002 CV_{60}	—	February 6, 2002	Socorro	LINEAR	·	1.1 km	MPC · JPL
211053	2002 CF_{64}	—	February 6, 2002	Socorro	LINEAR	·	1.2 km	MPC · JPL
211054	2002 CO_{91}	—	February 7, 2002	Socorro	LINEAR	·	1.1 km	MPC · JPL
211055	2002 CO_{97}	—	February 7, 2002	Socorro	LINEAR	·	1.1 km	MPC · JPL
211056	2002 CY_{113}	—	February 8, 2002	Socorro	LINEAR	·	1.1 km	MPC · JPL
211057	2002 CP_{126}	—	February 7, 2002	Socorro	LINEAR	·	1.1 km	MPC · JPL
211058	2002 CR_{126}	—	February 7, 2002	Socorro	LINEAR	·	850 m	MPC · JPL
211059	2002 CK_{128}	—	February 7, 2002	Socorro	LINEAR	·	1.5 km	MPC · JPL
211060	2002 CX_{131}	—	February 7, 2002	Socorro	LINEAR	·	920 m	MPC · JPL
211061	2002 CA_{137}	—	February 8, 2002	Socorro	LINEAR	·	1.1 km	MPC · JPL
211062	2002 CH_{137}	—	February 8, 2002	Socorro	LINEAR	·	1.2 km	MPC · JPL
211063	2002 CD_{155}	—	February 6, 2002	Socorro	LINEAR	·	1.2 km	MPC · JPL
211064	2002 CM_{160}	—	February 8, 2002	Socorro	LINEAR	·	930 m	MPC · JPL
211065	2002 CQ_{168}	—	February 8, 2002	Socorro	LINEAR	·	1.3 km	MPC · JPL
211066	2002 CC_{174}	—	February 8, 2002	Socorro	LINEAR	·	2.2 km	MPC · JPL
211067	2002 CN_{183}	—	February 10, 2002	Socorro	LINEAR	·	1.0 km	MPC · JPL
211068	2002 CF_{199}	—	February 10, 2002	Socorro	LINEAR	·	1.2 km	MPC · JPL
211069	2002 CT_{210}	—	February 10, 2002	Socorro	LINEAR	·	1.1 km	MPC · JPL
211070	2002 CN_{213}	—	February 10, 2002	Socorro	LINEAR	·	1.2 km	MPC · JPL
211071	2002 CW_{216}	—	February 10, 2002	Socorro	LINEAR	V	960 m	MPC · JPL
211072	2002 CH_{223}	—	February 11, 2002	Socorro	LINEAR	·	1.1 km	MPC · JPL
211073	2002 CS_{240}	—	February 11, 2002	Socorro	LINEAR	·	1.0 km	MPC · JPL
211074	2002 CF_{241}	—	February 11, 2002	Socorro	LINEAR	·	1.4 km	MPC · JPL
211075	2002 CY_{244}	—	February 13, 2002	Socorro	LINEAR	·	1.2 km	MPC · JPL
211076	2002 CU_{253}	—	February 4, 2002	Anderson Mesa	LONEOS	·	1.4 km	MPC · JPL
211077 Hongkang	2002 CT_{271}	Hongkang	February 8, 2002	Kitt Peak	M. W. Buie	·	3.1 km	MPC · JPL
211078	2002 EG_{3}	—	March 10, 2002	Haleakala	NEAT	·	1.2 km	MPC · JPL
211079	2002 EL_{8}	—	March 7, 2002	Cima Ekar	ADAS	·	1.1 km	MPC · JPL
211080	2002 EC_{12}	—	March 13, 2002	Desert Eagle	W. K. Y. Yeung	·	1.1 km	MPC · JPL
211081	2002 EA_{15}	—	March 5, 2002	Kitt Peak	Spacewatch	NYS	1.0 km	MPC · JPL
211082	2002 EN_{22}	—	March 10, 2002	Haleakala	NEAT	·	1.2 km	MPC · JPL
211083	2002 EZ_{32}	—	March 11, 2002	Palomar	NEAT	·	1.2 km	MPC · JPL
211084	2002 EY_{34}	—	March 11, 2002	Palomar	NEAT	·	1.7 km	MPC · JPL
211085	2002 EV_{44}	—	March 10, 2002	Haleakala	NEAT	·	1.1 km	MPC · JPL
211086	2002 EP_{49}	—	March 12, 2002	Palomar	NEAT	(2076)	930 m	MPC · JPL
211087	2002 ED_{52}	—	March 9, 2002	Socorro	LINEAR	NYS	830 m	MPC · JPL
211088	2002 EX_{61}	—	March 13, 2002	Socorro	LINEAR	V	690 m	MPC · JPL
211089	2002 EL_{62}	—	March 13, 2002	Socorro	LINEAR	·	1.1 km	MPC · JPL
211090	2002 EJ_{69}	—	March 13, 2002	Socorro	LINEAR	·	1.3 km	MPC · JPL
211091	2002 EP_{71}	—	March 13, 2002	Socorro	LINEAR	·	1.0 km	MPC · JPL
211092	2002 EX_{71}	—	March 13, 2002	Socorro	LINEAR	·	1.2 km	MPC · JPL
211093	2002 EM_{77}	—	March 11, 2002	Kitt Peak	Spacewatch	·	1.3 km	MPC · JPL
211094	2002 EA_{81}	—	March 13, 2002	Palomar	NEAT	·	980 m	MPC · JPL
211095	2002 EL_{89}	—	March 12, 2002	Socorro	LINEAR	·	1.2 km	MPC · JPL
211096	2002 EQ_{91}	—	March 12, 2002	Socorro	LINEAR	·	1.2 km	MPC · JPL
211097	2002 EO_{92}	—	March 13, 2002	Socorro	LINEAR	·	1.4 km	MPC · JPL
211098	2002 EG_{104}	—	March 9, 2002	Anderson Mesa	LONEOS	·	1.5 km	MPC · JPL
211099	2002 EF_{108}	—	March 9, 2002	Palomar	NEAT	·	1.1 km	MPC · JPL
211100	2002 EX_{111}	—	March 9, 2002	Kitt Peak	Spacewatch	·	660 m	MPC · JPL

== 211101–211200 ==
back to top

Designation			Discovery			Properties		Ref
Permanent	Provisional	Named after	Date	Site	Discoverer(s)	Category	Diam.	Ref
211101	2002 EK_{121}	—	March 11, 2002	Palomar	NEAT	·	1.0 km	MPC · JPL
211102	2002 EE_{130}	—	March 12, 2002	Anderson Mesa	LONEOS	·	1.1 km	MPC · JPL
211103	2002 EV_{144}	—	March 13, 2002	Palomar	NEAT	V	1.0 km	MPC · JPL
211104	2002 EP_{145}	—	March 13, 2002	Socorro	LINEAR	·	1.3 km	MPC · JPL
211105	2002 ET_{147}	—	March 15, 2002	Palomar	NEAT	·	1.1 km	MPC · JPL
211106 Francinewetzel	2002 EN_{151}	Francinewetzel	March 15, 2002	Kitt Peak	Spacewatch	·	1.3 km	MPC · JPL
211107	2002 EU_{151}	—	March 15, 2002	Socorro	LINEAR	·	2.3 km	MPC · JPL
211108	2002 EG_{152}	—	March 15, 2002	Palomar	NEAT	·	1.3 km	MPC · JPL
211109	2002 EY_{160}	—	March 10, 2002	Haleakala	NEAT	·	1.4 km	MPC · JPL
211110	2002 FY_{23}	—	March 18, 2002	Kitt Peak	Spacewatch	·	870 m	MPC · JPL
211111	2002 FT_{26}	—	March 20, 2002	Socorro	LINEAR	·	1.5 km	MPC · JPL
211112	2002 FX_{31}	—	March 20, 2002	Anderson Mesa	LONEOS	·	1.3 km	MPC · JPL
211113	2002 FF_{34}	—	March 20, 2002	Socorro	LINEAR	·	2.4 km	MPC · JPL
211114	2002 FX_{34}	—	March 20, 2002	Anderson Mesa	LONEOS	·	1.7 km	MPC · JPL
211115	2002 FY_{40}	—	March 21, 2002	Kitt Peak	Spacewatch	·	1.1 km	MPC · JPL
211116	2002 GR_{2}	—	April 4, 2002	Socorro	LINEAR	·	2.4 km	MPC · JPL
211117	2002 GP_{4}	—	April 10, 2002	Socorro	LINEAR	PHO	1.7 km	MPC · JPL
211118	2002 GR_{14}	—	April 15, 2002	Socorro	LINEAR	(2076)	1.9 km	MPC · JPL
211119	2002 GX_{33}	—	April 1, 2002	Palomar	NEAT	·	4.4 km	MPC · JPL
211120	2002 GL_{34}	—	April 1, 2002	Palomar	NEAT	·	1.1 km	MPC · JPL
211121	2002 GQ_{34}	—	April 2, 2002	Palomar	NEAT	·	980 m	MPC · JPL
211122	2002 GZ_{38}	—	April 2, 2002	Palomar	NEAT	·	1.2 km	MPC · JPL
211123	2002 GZ_{39}	—	April 4, 2002	Palomar	NEAT	·	990 m	MPC · JPL
211124	2002 GP_{42}	—	April 4, 2002	Palomar	NEAT	V	820 m	MPC · JPL
211125	2002 GY_{48}	—	April 4, 2002	Palomar	NEAT	·	1.0 km	MPC · JPL
211126	2002 GP_{50}	—	April 5, 2002	Palomar	NEAT	V	920 m	MPC · JPL
211127	2002 GS_{50}	—	April 5, 2002	Palomar	NEAT	·	1.5 km	MPC · JPL
211128	2002 GL_{51}	—	April 5, 2002	Palomar	NEAT	·	1.1 km	MPC · JPL
211129	2002 GN_{52}	—	April 5, 2002	Anderson Mesa	LONEOS	·	2.0 km	MPC · JPL
211130	2002 GH_{53}	—	April 5, 2002	Anderson Mesa	LONEOS	·	1.9 km	MPC · JPL
211131	2002 GH_{63}	—	April 8, 2002	Palomar	NEAT	NYS ·	2.6 km	MPC · JPL
211132	2002 GD_{71}	—	April 9, 2002	Kitt Peak	Spacewatch	·	1.1 km	MPC · JPL
211133	2002 GE_{71}	—	April 9, 2002	Kitt Peak	Spacewatch	·	1.0 km	MPC · JPL
211134	2002 GT_{80}	—	April 10, 2002	Socorro	LINEAR	·	1.4 km	MPC · JPL
211135	2002 GR_{81}	—	April 10, 2002	Socorro	LINEAR	NYS	2.4 km	MPC · JPL
211136	2002 GY_{84}	—	April 10, 2002	Socorro	LINEAR	·	1.8 km	MPC · JPL
211137	2002 GO_{87}	—	April 10, 2002	Socorro	LINEAR	·	1.4 km	MPC · JPL
211138	2002 GO_{90}	—	April 8, 2002	Kitt Peak	Spacewatch	·	2.3 km	MPC · JPL
211139	2002 GW_{90}	—	April 8, 2002	Palomar	NEAT	V	870 m	MPC · JPL
211140	2002 GF_{93}	—	April 9, 2002	Socorro	LINEAR	·	1.5 km	MPC · JPL
211141	2002 GN_{94}	—	April 9, 2002	Socorro	LINEAR	·	1.5 km	MPC · JPL
211142	2002 GR_{95}	—	April 9, 2002	Socorro	LINEAR	V	1.1 km	MPC · JPL
211143	2002 GV_{100}	—	April 10, 2002	Socorro	LINEAR	·	1.4 km	MPC · JPL
211144	2002 GG_{104}	—	April 10, 2002	Socorro	LINEAR	·	2.6 km	MPC · JPL
211145	2002 GE_{105}	—	April 11, 2002	Anderson Mesa	LONEOS	·	1.8 km	MPC · JPL
211146	2002 GN_{106}	—	April 11, 2002	Anderson Mesa	LONEOS	V	930 m	MPC · JPL
211147	2002 GA_{114}	—	April 11, 2002	Socorro	LINEAR	·	1.9 km	MPC · JPL
211148	2002 GU_{114}	—	April 11, 2002	Socorro	LINEAR	·	1.1 km	MPC · JPL
211149	2002 GC_{135}	—	April 12, 2002	Socorro	LINEAR	·	1.4 km	MPC · JPL
211150	2002 GE_{137}	—	April 12, 2002	Kitt Peak	Spacewatch	MAS	770 m	MPC · JPL
211151	2002 GX_{146}	—	April 13, 2002	Palomar	NEAT	·	2.2 km	MPC · JPL
211152	2002 GY_{151}	—	April 12, 2002	Palomar	NEAT	·	1.2 km	MPC · JPL
211153	2002 GU_{152}	—	April 12, 2002	Palomar	NEAT	·	1.4 km	MPC · JPL
211154	2002 GP_{155}	—	April 13, 2002	Palomar	NEAT	·	1.4 km	MPC · JPL
211155	2002 GZ_{158}	—	April 14, 2002	Palomar	NEAT	·	1.5 km	MPC · JPL
211156	2002 GF_{162}	—	April 14, 2002	Palomar	NEAT	·	1.0 km	MPC · JPL
211157	2002 GP_{165}	—	April 15, 2002	Palomar	NEAT	NYS	2.1 km	MPC · JPL
211158	2002 GR_{168}	—	April 9, 2002	Socorro	LINEAR	·	1.3 km	MPC · JPL
211159	2002 GM_{172}	—	April 10, 2002	Socorro	LINEAR	·	970 m	MPC · JPL
211160	2002 GO_{173}	—	April 10, 2002	Socorro	LINEAR	·	1.3 km	MPC · JPL
211161	2002 GA_{182}	—	April 13, 2002	Palomar	NEAT	·	1.8 km	MPC · JPL
211162	2002 GC_{182}	—	April 14, 2002	Socorro	LINEAR	·	1.5 km	MPC · JPL
211163	2002 GZ_{182}	—	April 4, 2002	Haleakala	NEAT	·	1.3 km	MPC · JPL
211164	2002 HT	—	April 16, 2002	Desert Eagle	W. K. Y. Yeung	PHO	1.6 km	MPC · JPL
211165	2002 HZ_{1}	—	April 16, 2002	Socorro	LINEAR	·	1.2 km	MPC · JPL
211166	2002 HC_{7}	—	April 18, 2002	Desert Eagle	W. K. Y. Yeung	·	1.5 km	MPC · JPL
211167	2002 HT_{8}	—	April 21, 2002	Kitt Peak	Spacewatch	·	1.8 km	MPC · JPL
211168	2002 HY_{9}	—	April 17, 2002	Socorro	LINEAR	·	1.2 km	MPC · JPL
211169	2002 JT	—	May 3, 2002	Desert Eagle	W. K. Y. Yeung	·	1.3 km	MPC · JPL
211170	2002 JH_{2}	—	May 4, 2002	Desert Eagle	W. K. Y. Yeung	·	1.9 km	MPC · JPL
211171	2002 JN_{2}	—	May 4, 2002	Socorro	LINEAR	PHO	1.2 km	MPC · JPL
211172 Tarantola	2002 JX_{10}	Tarantola	May 2, 2002	Needville	J. Dellinger, Sava, P.	·	1.4 km	MPC · JPL
211173	2002 JQ_{15}	—	May 8, 2002	Socorro	LINEAR	NYS	1.6 km	MPC · JPL
211174	2002 JR_{20}	—	May 7, 2002	Palomar	NEAT	·	1.8 km	MPC · JPL
211175	2002 JO_{42}	—	May 8, 2002	Socorro	LINEAR	·	1.2 km	MPC · JPL
211176	2002 JN_{48}	—	May 9, 2002	Socorro	LINEAR	NYS	1.4 km	MPC · JPL
211177	2002 JZ_{49}	—	May 9, 2002	Socorro	LINEAR	·	1.7 km	MPC · JPL
211178	2002 JC_{63}	—	May 8, 2002	Socorro	LINEAR	·	1.7 km	MPC · JPL
211179	2002 JQ_{79}	—	May 11, 2002	Socorro	LINEAR	·	2.2 km	MPC · JPL
211180	2002 JW_{83}	—	May 11, 2002	Socorro	LINEAR	·	1.7 km	MPC · JPL
211181	2002 JA_{91}	—	May 11, 2002	Socorro	LINEAR	V	990 m	MPC · JPL
211182	2002 JX_{94}	—	May 11, 2002	Socorro	LINEAR	·	1.3 km	MPC · JPL
211183	2002 JF_{113}	—	May 15, 2002	Palomar	NEAT	·	1.6 km	MPC · JPL
211184	2002 JJ_{113}	—	May 15, 2002	Palomar	NEAT	PHO	1.4 km	MPC · JPL
211185	2002 JT_{114}	—	May 13, 2002	Socorro	LINEAR	·	1.8 km	MPC · JPL
211186	2002 JN_{129}	—	May 8, 2002	Socorro	LINEAR	·	1.4 km	MPC · JPL
211187	2002 JG_{149}	—	May 8, 2002	Socorro	LINEAR	·	1.4 km	MPC · JPL
211188	2002 KK_{1}	—	May 16, 2002	Haleakala	NEAT	PHO	1.4 km	MPC · JPL
211189	2002 KU_{1}	—	May 17, 2002	Palomar	NEAT	·	1.8 km	MPC · JPL
211190	2002 KR_{15}	—	May 18, 2002	Palomar	NEAT	MAS	1.1 km	MPC · JPL
211191	2002 LR_{9}	—	June 5, 2002	Socorro	LINEAR	·	1.8 km	MPC · JPL
211192	2002 LR_{10}	—	June 5, 2002	Socorro	LINEAR	·	2.7 km	MPC · JPL
211193	2002 LP_{31}	—	June 6, 2002	Socorro	LINEAR	·	1.3 km	MPC · JPL
211194	2002 LF_{44}	—	June 10, 2002	Palomar	NEAT	·	1.8 km	MPC · JPL
211195	2002 LN_{46}	—	June 11, 2002	Socorro	LINEAR	PHO	1.7 km	MPC · JPL
211196	2002 LU_{48}	—	June 13, 2002	Palomar	NEAT	·	3.5 km	MPC · JPL
211197	2002 LY_{49}	—	June 8, 2002	Socorro	LINEAR	·	1.7 km	MPC · JPL
211198	2002 LL_{54}	—	June 15, 2002	Palomar	NEAT	·	1.8 km	MPC · JPL
211199	2002 NL_{7}	—	July 12, 2002	Reedy Creek	J. Broughton	·	2.1 km	MPC · JPL
211200	2002 NP_{46}	—	July 13, 2002	Palomar	NEAT	·	2.9 km	MPC · JPL

== 211201–211300 ==
back to top

Designation			Discovery			Properties		Ref
Permanent	Provisional	Named after	Date	Site	Discoverer(s)	Category	Diam.	Ref
211201	2002 NV_{55}	—	July 12, 2002	Palomar	NEAT	NYS	1.6 km	MPC · JPL
211202	2002 NT_{58}	—	July 12, 2002	Palomar	NEAT	·	1.5 km	MPC · JPL
211203	2002 NJ_{62}	—	July 14, 2002	Palomar	NEAT	MAS	1.1 km	MPC · JPL
211204	2002 NJ_{64}	—	July 8, 2002	Palomar	NEAT	·	1.7 km	MPC · JPL
211205	2002 OD_{19}	—	July 18, 2002	Palomar	NEAT	·	4.6 km	MPC · JPL
211206	2002 OM_{24}	—	July 19, 2002	Palomar	NEAT	·	930 m	MPC · JPL
211207	2002 OV_{27}	—	July 22, 2002	Palomar	NEAT	·	1.5 km	MPC · JPL
211208	2002 OK_{29}	—	July 17, 2002	Palomar	NEAT	·	1.9 km	MPC · JPL
211209	2002 OM_{31}	—	July 18, 2002	Palomar	NEAT	AST	2.2 km	MPC · JPL
211210	2002 PZ_{2}	—	August 3, 2002	Palomar	NEAT	·	3.5 km	MPC · JPL
211211	2002 PR_{11}	—	August 5, 2002	Gnosca	S. Sposetti	·	2.2 km	MPC · JPL
211212	2002 PZ_{21}	—	August 6, 2002	Palomar	NEAT	·	1.6 km	MPC · JPL
211213	2002 PO_{33}	—	August 6, 2002	Campo Imperatore	CINEOS	MAR	1.4 km	MPC · JPL
211214	2002 PC_{37}	—	August 4, 2002	Socorro	LINEAR	BAR	2.8 km	MPC · JPL
211215	2002 PP_{39}	—	August 7, 2002	Palomar	NEAT	·	1.4 km	MPC · JPL
211216	2002 PA_{63}	—	August 8, 2002	Palomar	NEAT	·	1.7 km	MPC · JPL
211217	2002 PY_{63}	—	August 2, 2002	Campo Imperatore	CINEOS	·	2.7 km	MPC · JPL
211218	2002 PN_{65}	—	August 5, 2002	Palomar	NEAT	·	1.5 km	MPC · JPL
211219	2002 PQ_{78}	—	August 11, 2002	Palomar	NEAT	·	3.1 km	MPC · JPL
211220	2002 PV_{85}	—	August 13, 2002	Socorro	LINEAR	NYS	1.7 km	MPC · JPL
211221	2002 PA_{86}	—	August 13, 2002	Socorro	LINEAR	·	2.9 km	MPC · JPL
211222	2002 PU_{87}	—	August 14, 2002	Socorro	LINEAR	H	760 m	MPC · JPL
211223	2002 PU_{89}	—	August 11, 2002	Socorro	LINEAR	·	1.6 km	MPC · JPL
211224	2002 PO_{96}	—	August 14, 2002	Socorro	LINEAR	·	1.6 km	MPC · JPL
211225	2002 PP_{96}	—	August 14, 2002	Socorro	LINEAR	·	1.9 km	MPC · JPL
211226	2002 PL_{100}	—	August 14, 2002	Socorro	LINEAR	·	2.0 km	MPC · JPL
211227	2002 PS_{103}	—	August 12, 2002	Socorro	LINEAR	·	1.7 km	MPC · JPL
211228	2002 PD_{104}	—	August 12, 2002	Socorro	LINEAR	EUN	1.2 km	MPC · JPL
211229	2002 PX_{114}	—	August 15, 2002	Kitt Peak	Spacewatch	·	2.3 km	MPC · JPL
211230	2002 PO_{133}	—	August 14, 2002	Socorro	LINEAR	NYS	1.7 km	MPC · JPL
211231	2002 PM_{139}	—	August 12, 2002	Haleakala	NEAT	·	3.8 km	MPC · JPL
211232 Kellykevin	2002 PW_{144}	Kellykevin	August 9, 2002	Cerro Tololo	M. W. Buie	·	1.8 km	MPC · JPL
211233	2002 PW_{155}	—	August 8, 2002	Palomar	S. F. Hönig	·	2.1 km	MPC · JPL
211234	2002 PR_{173}	—	August 13, 2002	Nanchuan	Q. Ye	V	890 m	MPC · JPL
211235	2002 PE_{174}	—	August 8, 2002	Palomar	NEAT	EUN	1.5 km	MPC · JPL
211236	2002 PT_{178}	—	August 13, 2002	Anderson Mesa	LONEOS	·	2.2 km	MPC · JPL
211237	2002 PK_{182}	—	August 11, 2002	Haleakala	NEAT	NYS	1.6 km	MPC · JPL
211238	2002 PK_{184}	—	August 4, 2002	Palomar	NEAT	·	2.2 km	MPC · JPL
211239	2002 QG_{2}	—	August 16, 2002	Haleakala	NEAT	·	1.6 km	MPC · JPL
211240	2002 QL_{7}	—	August 16, 2002	Palomar	NEAT	·	1.5 km	MPC · JPL
211241	2002 QZ_{16}	—	August 27, 2002	Palomar	NEAT	H	830 m	MPC · JPL
211242	2002 QB_{21}	—	August 28, 2002	Palomar	NEAT	PAD	4.0 km	MPC · JPL
211243	2002 QJ_{30}	—	August 29, 2002	Palomar	NEAT	·	2.7 km	MPC · JPL
211244	2002 QB_{33}	—	August 29, 2002	Palomar	NEAT	·	1.7 km	MPC · JPL
211245	2002 QB_{56}	—	August 28, 2002	Palomar	R. Matson	·	5.1 km	MPC · JPL
211246	2002 QK_{58}	—	August 17, 2002	Palomar	Lowe, A.	EUN	1.8 km	MPC · JPL
211247	2002 QN_{80}	—	August 28, 2002	Palomar	NEAT	·	2.6 km	MPC · JPL
211248	2002 QL_{102}	—	August 20, 2002	Palomar	NEAT	·	1.7 km	MPC · JPL
211249	2002 QN_{107}	—	August 17, 2002	Palomar	NEAT	·	1.7 km	MPC · JPL
211250	2002 QS_{107}	—	August 27, 2002	Palomar	NEAT	·	1.9 km	MPC · JPL
211251	2002 QF_{112}	—	August 27, 2002	Palomar	NEAT	EOS	2.7 km	MPC · JPL
211252	2002 QD_{116}	—	August 19, 2002	Palomar	NEAT	·	1.7 km	MPC · JPL
211253	2002 QM_{116}	—	August 29, 2002	Palomar	NEAT	·	1.3 km	MPC · JPL
211254	2002 QV_{123}	—	August 29, 2002	Palomar	NEAT	·	2.3 km	MPC · JPL
211255	2002 QV_{127}	—	August 29, 2002	Palomar	NEAT	NYS	2.1 km	MPC · JPL
211256	2002 QW_{130}	—	August 30, 2002	Palomar	NEAT	MAS	730 m	MPC · JPL
211257	2002 RJ	—	September 1, 2002	Kvistaberg	Uppsala-DLR Asteroid Survey	·	3.0 km	MPC · JPL
211258	2002 RD_{12}	—	September 4, 2002	Anderson Mesa	LONEOS	ADE	3.0 km	MPC · JPL
211259	2002 RW_{14}	—	September 4, 2002	Anderson Mesa	LONEOS	·	2.4 km	MPC · JPL
211260	2002 RH_{15}	—	September 4, 2002	Anderson Mesa	LONEOS	·	3.4 km	MPC · JPL
211261	2002 RV_{26}	—	September 4, 2002	Anderson Mesa	LONEOS	H	830 m	MPC · JPL
211262	2002 RE_{36}	—	September 5, 2002	Anderson Mesa	LONEOS	·	4.6 km	MPC · JPL
211263	2002 RD_{38}	—	September 5, 2002	Socorro	LINEAR	·	2.2 km	MPC · JPL
211264	2002 RX_{51}	—	September 5, 2002	Socorro	LINEAR	GAL	2.9 km	MPC · JPL
211265	2002 RF_{62}	—	September 5, 2002	Socorro	LINEAR	526	4.0 km	MPC · JPL
211266	2002 RE_{66}	—	September 5, 2002	Socorro	LINEAR	H	640 m	MPC · JPL
211267	2002 RP_{69}	—	September 4, 2002	Anderson Mesa	LONEOS	·	2.6 km	MPC · JPL
211268	2002 RX_{71}	—	September 5, 2002	Socorro	LINEAR	·	1.9 km	MPC · JPL
211269	2002 RU_{73}	—	September 5, 2002	Socorro	LINEAR	·	2.2 km	MPC · JPL
211270	2002 RD_{78}	—	September 5, 2002	Socorro	LINEAR	·	2.3 km	MPC · JPL
211271	2002 RU_{83}	—	September 5, 2002	Socorro	LINEAR	·	2.2 km	MPC · JPL
211272	2002 RV_{87}	—	September 5, 2002	Socorro	LINEAR	·	3.1 km	MPC · JPL
211273	2002 RM_{101}	—	September 5, 2002	Socorro	LINEAR	·	3.4 km	MPC · JPL
211274	2002 RH_{102}	—	September 5, 2002	Socorro	LINEAR	·	3.2 km	MPC · JPL
211275	2002 RU_{103}	—	September 5, 2002	Socorro	LINEAR	H	710 m	MPC · JPL
211276	2002 RV_{114}	—	September 6, 2002	Socorro	LINEAR	·	1.9 km	MPC · JPL
211277	2002 RC_{127}	—	September 10, 2002	Palomar	NEAT	·	2.8 km	MPC · JPL
211278	2002 RR_{131}	—	September 11, 2002	Palomar	NEAT	H · slow	870 m	MPC · JPL
211279	2002 RN_{137}	—	September 13, 2002	Socorro	LINEAR	H	880 m	MPC · JPL
211280	2002 RV_{142}	—	September 11, 2002	Palomar	NEAT	·	1.9 km	MPC · JPL
211281	2002 RU_{146}	—	September 11, 2002	Palomar	NEAT	·	1.8 km	MPC · JPL
211282	2002 RR_{151}	—	September 12, 2002	Palomar	NEAT	·	3.6 km	MPC · JPL
211283	2002 RM_{152}	—	September 12, 2002	Palomar	NEAT	EUN	3.9 km	MPC · JPL
211284	2002 RS_{153}	—	September 13, 2002	Kitt Peak	Spacewatch	·	1.6 km	MPC · JPL
211285	2002 RT_{155}	—	September 11, 2002	Palomar	NEAT	·	1.8 km	MPC · JPL
211286	2002 RD_{157}	—	September 11, 2002	Palomar	NEAT	·	1.7 km	MPC · JPL
211287	2002 RZ_{157}	—	September 11, 2002	Palomar	NEAT	·	2.1 km	MPC · JPL
211288	2002 RU_{160}	—	September 12, 2002	Palomar	NEAT	·	2.6 km	MPC · JPL
211289	2002 RA_{162}	—	September 12, 2002	Palomar	NEAT	PAD	2.2 km	MPC · JPL
211290	2002 RQ_{162}	—	September 12, 2002	Palomar	NEAT	·	2.2 km	MPC · JPL
211291	2002 RG_{169}	—	September 13, 2002	Palomar	NEAT	·	2.3 km	MPC · JPL
211292	2002 RM_{190}	—	September 14, 2002	Palomar	NEAT	·	2.5 km	MPC · JPL
211293	2002 RV_{197}	—	September 13, 2002	Palomar	NEAT	·	2.0 km	MPC · JPL
211294	2002 RE_{198}	—	September 13, 2002	Palomar	NEAT	·	2.2 km	MPC · JPL
211295	2002 RR_{216}	—	September 13, 2002	Haleakala	NEAT	·	2.5 km	MPC · JPL
211296	2002 RY_{219}	—	September 15, 2002	Palomar	NEAT	·	1.6 km	MPC · JPL
211297	2002 RH_{220}	—	September 15, 2002	Palomar	NEAT	·	1.9 km	MPC · JPL
211298	2002 RN_{227}	—	September 14, 2002	Palomar	NEAT	·	1.8 km	MPC · JPL
211299	2002 RZ_{237}	—	September 15, 2002	Palomar	R. Matson	·	2.1 km	MPC · JPL
211300	2002 RN_{268}	—	September 4, 2002	Palomar	NEAT	·	1.7 km	MPC · JPL

== 211301–211400 ==
back to top

Designation			Discovery			Properties		Ref
Permanent	Provisional	Named after	Date	Site	Discoverer(s)	Category	Diam.	Ref
211301	2002 RZ_{275}	—	September 14, 2002	Palomar	NEAT	·	1.5 km	MPC · JPL
211302	2002 RM_{277}	—	September 15, 2002	Palomar	NEAT	NEM	2.3 km	MPC · JPL
211303	2002 SK	—	September 17, 2002	Haleakala	NEAT	ADE	4.1 km	MPC · JPL
211304	2002 SR_{3}	—	September 26, 2002	Palomar	NEAT	·	1.5 km	MPC · JPL
211305	2002 ST_{9}	—	September 27, 2002	Palomar	NEAT	·	2.0 km	MPC · JPL
211306	2002 SN_{19}	—	September 28, 2002	Powell	Powell	·	2.7 km	MPC · JPL
211307	2002 SJ_{22}	—	September 26, 2002	Palomar	NEAT	·	3.0 km	MPC · JPL
211308	2002 SL_{29}	—	September 28, 2002	Palomar	NEAT	·	2.5 km	MPC · JPL
211309	2002 SX_{31}	—	September 28, 2002	Haleakala	NEAT	·	1.5 km	MPC · JPL
211310	2002 SO_{33}	—	September 28, 2002	Haleakala	NEAT	GEF	1.9 km	MPC · JPL
211311	2002 SN_{34}	—	September 29, 2002	Haleakala	NEAT	·	1.8 km	MPC · JPL
211312	2002 SD_{36}	—	September 29, 2002	Haleakala	NEAT	·	3.4 km	MPC · JPL
211313	2002 SF_{38}	—	September 30, 2002	Socorro	LINEAR	H	870 m	MPC · JPL
211314	2002 SC_{39}	—	September 30, 2002	Socorro	LINEAR	·	1.8 km	MPC · JPL
211315	2002 SW_{40}	—	September 30, 2002	Haleakala	NEAT	·	4.8 km	MPC · JPL
211316	2002 SW_{41}	—	September 29, 2002	Haleakala	NEAT	H	810 m	MPC · JPL
211317	2002 SE_{42}	—	September 28, 2002	Palomar	NEAT	·	2.9 km	MPC · JPL
211318	2002 SJ_{50}	—	September 30, 2002	Haleakala	NEAT	NYS	1.7 km	MPC · JPL
211319	2002 SP_{53}	—	September 20, 2002	Palomar	NEAT	·	4.1 km	MPC · JPL
211320	2002 SJ_{54}	—	September 30, 2002	Socorro	LINEAR	·	2.3 km	MPC · JPL
211321	2002 SG_{58}	—	September 30, 2002	Haleakala	NEAT	·	3.3 km	MPC · JPL
211322	2002 ST_{58}	—	September 30, 2002	Socorro	LINEAR	·	1.6 km	MPC · JPL
211323	2002 SB_{59}	—	September 28, 2002	Kingsnake	J. V. McClusky	·	4.8 km	MPC · JPL
211324	2002 SN_{61}	—	September 16, 2002	Palomar	NEAT	RAF	1.1 km	MPC · JPL
211325	2002 SC_{63}	—	September 16, 2002	Palomar	R. Matson	·	2.0 km	MPC · JPL
211326	2002 SZ_{65}	—	September 16, 2002	Palomar	NEAT	·	2.1 km	MPC · JPL
211327	2002 SM_{66}	—	September 16, 2002	Palomar	NEAT	·	2.3 km	MPC · JPL
211328	2002 TE_{1}	—	October 1, 2002	Anderson Mesa	LONEOS	·	3.1 km	MPC · JPL
211329	2002 TA_{8}	—	October 1, 2002	Haleakala	NEAT	·	2.2 km	MPC · JPL
211330	2002 TM_{10}	—	October 2, 2002	Haleakala	NEAT	(18466)	3.4 km	MPC · JPL
211331	2002 TT_{17}	—	October 2, 2002	Socorro	LINEAR	·	2.1 km	MPC · JPL
211332	2002 TH_{23}	—	October 2, 2002	Socorro	LINEAR	·	2.8 km	MPC · JPL
211333	2002 TF_{25}	—	October 2, 2002	Socorro	LINEAR	·	3.0 km	MPC · JPL
211334	2002 TD_{26}	—	October 2, 2002	Socorro	LINEAR	·	2.3 km	MPC · JPL
211335	2002 TJ_{27}	—	October 2, 2002	Socorro	LINEAR	·	2.5 km	MPC · JPL
211336	2002 TQ_{32}	—	October 2, 2002	Socorro	LINEAR	·	4.7 km	MPC · JPL
211337	2002 TV_{33}	—	October 2, 2002	Socorro	LINEAR	(5)	1.3 km	MPC · JPL
211338	2002 TW_{33}	—	October 2, 2002	Socorro	LINEAR	EUN	2.0 km	MPC · JPL
211339	2002 TJ_{35}	—	October 2, 2002	Socorro	LINEAR	·	1.8 km	MPC · JPL
211340	2002 TT_{37}	—	October 2, 2002	Socorro	LINEAR	·	2.5 km	MPC · JPL
211341	2002 TF_{41}	—	October 2, 2002	Socorro	LINEAR	H	960 m	MPC · JPL
211342	2002 TW_{59}	—	October 4, 2002	Palomar	NEAT	H	580 m	MPC · JPL
211343 Dieterhusar	2002 TJ_{68}	Dieterhusar	October 8, 2002	Trebur	Kretlow, M.	·	1.7 km	MPC · JPL
211344	2002 TP_{68}	—	October 7, 2002	Haleakala	NEAT	·	5.3 km	MPC · JPL
211345	2002 TV_{79}	—	October 1, 2002	Socorro	LINEAR	·	2.3 km	MPC · JPL
211346	2002 TV_{93}	—	October 3, 2002	Socorro	LINEAR	AEO	1.4 km	MPC · JPL
211347	2002 TW_{98}	—	October 3, 2002	Socorro	LINEAR	·	2.4 km	MPC · JPL
211348	2002 TR_{110}	—	October 2, 2002	Haleakala	NEAT	·	2.1 km	MPC · JPL
211349	2002 TB_{120}	—	October 3, 2002	Palomar	NEAT	·	2.8 km	MPC · JPL
211350	2002 TV_{125}	—	October 4, 2002	Socorro	LINEAR	·	2.7 km	MPC · JPL
211351	2002 TA_{128}	—	October 4, 2002	Palomar	NEAT	MAR	2.0 km	MPC · JPL
211352	2002 TG_{140}	—	October 3, 2002	Socorro	LINEAR	·	2.5 km	MPC · JPL
211353	2002 TV_{157}	—	October 5, 2002	Palomar	NEAT	·	2.4 km	MPC · JPL
211354	2002 TL_{158}	—	October 5, 2002	Palomar	NEAT	EUN	2.1 km	MPC · JPL
211355	2002 TY_{164}	—	October 2, 2002	Haleakala	NEAT	·	5.6 km	MPC · JPL
211356	2002 TB_{167}	—	October 3, 2002	Palomar	NEAT	·	3.6 km	MPC · JPL
211357	2002 TR_{168}	—	October 3, 2002	Palomar	NEAT	·	2.4 km	MPC · JPL
211358	2002 TO_{187}	—	October 4, 2002	Socorro	LINEAR	·	2.9 km	MPC · JPL
211359	2002 TM_{190}	—	October 14, 2002	Powell	Powell	T_{j} (2.88)	6.9 km	MPC · JPL
211360	2002 TM_{193}	—	October 3, 2002	Socorro	LINEAR	·	2.5 km	MPC · JPL
211361	2002 TT_{200}	—	October 6, 2002	Socorro	LINEAR	·	3.7 km	MPC · JPL
211362	2002 TB_{206}	—	October 4, 2002	Socorro	LINEAR	MRX	1.5 km	MPC · JPL
211363	2002 TS_{208}	—	October 5, 2002	Socorro	LINEAR	·	2.6 km	MPC · JPL
211364	2002 TD_{210}	—	October 7, 2002	Socorro	LINEAR	·	3.1 km	MPC · JPL
211365	2002 TO_{213}	—	October 3, 2002	Socorro	LINEAR	·	2.5 km	MPC · JPL
211366	2002 TH_{228}	—	October 6, 2002	Haleakala	NEAT	·	4.3 km	MPC · JPL
211367	2002 TG_{241}	—	October 7, 2002	Socorro	LINEAR	·	2.6 km	MPC · JPL
211368	2002 TV_{245}	—	October 9, 2002	Anderson Mesa	LONEOS	·	2.6 km	MPC · JPL
211369	2002 TD_{257}	—	October 9, 2002	Socorro	LINEAR	AGN	1.8 km	MPC · JPL
211370	2002 TL_{264}	—	October 10, 2002	Socorro	LINEAR	H	1.0 km	MPC · JPL
211371	2002 TH_{268}	—	October 9, 2002	Socorro	LINEAR	·	3.6 km	MPC · JPL
211372	2002 TK_{274}	—	October 9, 2002	Socorro	LINEAR	EUN	2.1 km	MPC · JPL
211373	2002 TF_{276}	—	October 9, 2002	Socorro	LINEAR	·	1.5 km	MPC · JPL
211374 Anthonyrose	2002 TN_{309}	Anthonyrose	October 4, 2002	Apache Point	SDSS	ADE	3.6 km	MPC · JPL
211375 Jessesteed	2002 TS_{326}	Jessesteed	October 5, 2002	Apache Point	SDSS	HOF	3.2 km	MPC · JPL
211376 Joethurston	2002 TT_{330}	Joethurston	October 5, 2002	Apache Point	SDSS	·	2.9 km	MPC · JPL
211377 Travisturbyfill	2002 TK_{333}	Travisturbyfill	October 5, 2002	Apache Point	SDSS	·	1.9 km	MPC · JPL
211378 Williamwarneke	2002 TF_{334}	Williamwarneke	October 5, 2002	Apache Point	SDSS	·	2.0 km	MPC · JPL
211379 Claytonwhitted	2002 TH_{334}	Claytonwhitted	October 5, 2002	Apache Point	SDSS	·	3.9 km	MPC · JPL
211380 Kevinwoyjeck	2002 TY_{336}	Kevinwoyjeck	October 5, 2002	Apache Point	SDSS	·	2.2 km	MPC · JPL
211381 Garretzuppiger	2002 TZ_{343}	Garretzuppiger	October 5, 2002	Apache Point	SDSS	EUN	1.6 km	MPC · JPL
211382	2002 TZ_{379}	—	October 6, 2002	Palomar	NEAT	AST	2.1 km	MPC · JPL
211383	2002 TC_{380}	—	October 9, 2002	Palomar	NEAT	·	1.9 km	MPC · JPL
211384	2002 UL_{4}	—	October 28, 2002	Socorro	LINEAR	H	1.0 km	MPC · JPL
211385	2002 UY_{8}	—	October 28, 2002	Palomar	NEAT	·	2.7 km	MPC · JPL
211386	2002 UQ_{17}	—	October 29, 2002	Kitt Peak	Spacewatch	EUN	1.9 km	MPC · JPL
211387	2002 UG_{21}	—	October 30, 2002	Kitt Peak	Spacewatch	·	3.1 km	MPC · JPL
211388	2002 UN_{29}	—	October 31, 2002	Palomar	NEAT	·	1.8 km	MPC · JPL
211389	2002 UL_{31}	—	October 30, 2002	Haleakala	NEAT	GEF	1.7 km	MPC · JPL
211390	2002 UG_{34}	—	October 30, 2002	Palomar	NEAT	H	840 m	MPC · JPL
211391	2002 UM_{39}	—	October 31, 2002	Palomar	NEAT	·	2.1 km	MPC · JPL
211392	2002 UB_{48}	—	October 31, 2002	Socorro	LINEAR	·	3.6 km	MPC · JPL
211393	2002 UK_{56}	—	October 29, 2002	Apache Point	SDSS	·	2.8 km	MPC · JPL
211394	2002 VK	—	November 1, 2002	Palomar	NEAT	EUN	1.7 km	MPC · JPL
211395	2002 VE_{10}	—	November 1, 2002	Palomar	NEAT	·	2.1 km	MPC · JPL
211396	2002 VZ_{12}	—	November 4, 2002	Palomar	NEAT	HOF	3.5 km	MPC · JPL
211397	2002 VD_{14}	—	November 5, 2002	Socorro	LINEAR	·	960 m	MPC · JPL
211398	2002 VN_{15}	—	November 7, 2002	Eskridge	G. Hug	·	2.5 km	MPC · JPL
211399	2002 VB_{18}	—	November 2, 2002	Haleakala	NEAT	AGN	1.7 km	MPC · JPL
211400	2002 VX_{26}	—	November 5, 2002	Socorro	LINEAR	·	3.0 km	MPC · JPL

== 211401–211500 ==
back to top

Designation			Discovery			Properties		Ref
Permanent	Provisional	Named after	Date	Site	Discoverer(s)	Category	Diam.	Ref
211401	2002 VX_{40}	—	November 1, 2002	Palomar	NEAT	·	2.7 km	MPC · JPL
211402	2002 VE_{50}	—	November 5, 2002	Anderson Mesa	LONEOS	NEM	3.1 km	MPC · JPL
211403	2002 VW_{52}	—	November 6, 2002	Socorro	LINEAR	·	2.9 km	MPC · JPL
211404	2002 VU_{57}	—	November 6, 2002	Haleakala	NEAT	·	2.6 km	MPC · JPL
211405	2002 VH_{61}	—	November 5, 2002	Socorro	LINEAR	·	2.5 km	MPC · JPL
211406	2002 VR_{69}	—	November 7, 2002	Socorro	LINEAR	·	3.2 km	MPC · JPL
211407	2002 VK_{73}	—	November 7, 2002	Socorro	LINEAR	·	2.6 km	MPC · JPL
211408	2002 VK_{86}	—	November 8, 2002	Socorro	LINEAR	NEM	2.9 km	MPC · JPL
211409	2002 VE_{87}	—	November 8, 2002	Socorro	LINEAR	·	3.3 km	MPC · JPL
211410	2002 VY_{92}	—	November 11, 2002	Socorro	LINEAR	GEF	2.3 km	MPC · JPL
211411	2002 VB_{98}	—	November 12, 2002	Socorro	LINEAR	·	2.9 km	MPC · JPL
211412	2002 VL_{103}	—	November 12, 2002	Socorro	LINEAR	TIN	1.8 km	MPC · JPL
211413	2002 VM_{111}	—	November 13, 2002	Palomar	NEAT	DOR	4.7 km	MPC · JPL
211414	2002 VY_{111}	—	November 13, 2002	Kitt Peak	Spacewatch	EUN	2.0 km	MPC · JPL
211415	2002 VA_{116}	—	November 11, 2002	Socorro	LINEAR	·	3.2 km	MPC · JPL
211416	2002 VP_{134}	—	November 6, 2002	Socorro	LINEAR	·	2.3 km	MPC · JPL
211417	2002 VW_{143}	—	November 4, 2002	Palomar	NEAT	·	2.9 km	MPC · JPL
211418	2002 WP_{12}	—	November 27, 2002	Anderson Mesa	LONEOS	·	4.9 km	MPC · JPL
211419	2002 WS_{14}	—	November 28, 2002	Anderson Mesa	LONEOS	·	3.7 km	MPC · JPL
211420	2002 WG_{22}	—	November 23, 2002	Palomar	NEAT	·	2.8 km	MPC · JPL
211421	2002 WD_{24}	—	November 16, 2002	Palomar	NEAT	KOR	1.9 km	MPC · JPL
211422	2002 WV_{24}	—	November 25, 2002	Palomar	NEAT	·	2.3 km	MPC · JPL
211423	2002 XE_{1}	—	December 1, 2002	Socorro	LINEAR	·	4.4 km	MPC · JPL
211424	2002 XE_{9}	—	December 2, 2002	Socorro	LINEAR	·	3.1 km	MPC · JPL
211425	2002 XW_{17}	—	December 5, 2002	Socorro	LINEAR	KOR	1.8 km	MPC · JPL
211426	2002 XJ_{19}	—	December 2, 2002	Socorro	LINEAR	EUN	2.1 km	MPC · JPL
211427	2002 XK_{20}	—	December 2, 2002	Socorro	LINEAR	·	2.9 km	MPC · JPL
211428	2002 XN_{30}	—	December 6, 2002	Socorro	LINEAR	THB	5.0 km	MPC · JPL
211429	2002 XD_{37}	—	December 7, 2002	Socorro	LINEAR	·	4.6 km	MPC · JPL
211430	2002 XN_{55}	—	December 10, 2002	Palomar	NEAT	·	2.6 km	MPC · JPL
211431	2002 XZ_{58}	—	December 11, 2002	Socorro	LINEAR	·	3.9 km	MPC · JPL
211432	2002 XO_{63}	—	December 11, 2002	Socorro	LINEAR	·	3.9 km	MPC · JPL
211433	2002 XL_{66}	—	December 10, 2002	Socorro	LINEAR	·	3.2 km	MPC · JPL
211434	2002 XR_{95}	—	December 5, 2002	Socorro	LINEAR	·	2.7 km	MPC · JPL
211435	2002 YM_{9}	—	December 31, 2002	Socorro	LINEAR	·	3.3 km	MPC · JPL
211436	2002 YN_{10}	—	December 31, 2002	Socorro	LINEAR	·	3.4 km	MPC · JPL
211437	2002 YY_{15}	—	December 31, 2002	Anderson Mesa	LONEOS	·	2.9 km	MPC · JPL
211438	2002 YD_{18}	—	December 31, 2002	Socorro	LINEAR	MRX	1.8 km	MPC · JPL
211439	2002 YD_{23}	—	December 31, 2002	Socorro	LINEAR	·	2.7 km	MPC · JPL
211440	2003 AH_{25}	—	January 4, 2003	Socorro	LINEAR	·	5.6 km	MPC · JPL
211441	2003 AC_{51}	—	January 5, 2003	Socorro	LINEAR	EOS	3.3 km	MPC · JPL
211442	2003 AR_{52}	—	January 5, 2003	Socorro	LINEAR	·	4.9 km	MPC · JPL
211443	2003 AU_{52}	—	January 5, 2003	Socorro	LINEAR	·	6.4 km	MPC · JPL
211444	2003 AK_{53}	—	January 5, 2003	Socorro	LINEAR	·	5.0 km	MPC · JPL
211445	2003 AM_{65}	—	January 7, 2003	Socorro	LINEAR	·	5.1 km	MPC · JPL
211446	2003 AR_{65}	—	January 7, 2003	Socorro	LINEAR	·	5.3 km	MPC · JPL
211447	2003 AS_{70}	—	January 10, 2003	Socorro	LINEAR	HYG	3.2 km	MPC · JPL
211448	2003 AK_{76}	—	January 10, 2003	Socorro	LINEAR	·	4.9 km	MPC · JPL
211449	2003 AL_{81}	—	January 10, 2003	Socorro	LINEAR	·	4.5 km	MPC · JPL
211450	2003 BZ_{11}	—	January 26, 2003	Anderson Mesa	LONEOS	·	4.1 km	MPC · JPL
211451	2003 BV_{27}	—	January 26, 2003	Palomar	NEAT	·	4.5 km	MPC · JPL
211452	2003 BG_{28}	—	January 26, 2003	Palomar	NEAT	·	3.9 km	MPC · JPL
211453	2003 BC_{33}	—	January 27, 2003	Palomar	NEAT	·	3.1 km	MPC · JPL
211454	2003 BF_{33}	—	January 27, 2003	Haleakala	NEAT	·	3.1 km	MPC · JPL
211455	2003 BV_{36}	—	January 28, 2003	Kitt Peak	Spacewatch	·	3.6 km	MPC · JPL
211456	2003 BD_{53}	—	January 27, 2003	Anderson Mesa	LONEOS	·	4.9 km	MPC · JPL
211457	2003 BE_{62}	—	January 28, 2003	Palomar	NEAT	·	4.5 km	MPC · JPL
211458	2003 BJ_{64}	—	January 29, 2003	Palomar	NEAT	·	4.0 km	MPC · JPL
211459	2003 BZ_{74}	—	January 29, 2003	Palomar	NEAT	TIR	4.2 km	MPC · JPL
211460	2003 BJ_{83}	—	January 31, 2003	Socorro	LINEAR	·	5.1 km	MPC · JPL
211461	2003 BB_{89}	—	January 28, 2003	Socorro	LINEAR	·	4.1 km	MPC · JPL
211462	2003 BE_{92}	—	January 27, 2003	Socorro	LINEAR	·	5.0 km	MPC · JPL
211463	2003 BD_{93}	—	January 26, 2003	Haleakala	NEAT	·	4.9 km	MPC · JPL
211464	2003 CL_{2}	—	February 1, 2003	Haleakala	NEAT	·	2.7 km	MPC · JPL
211465	2003 CV_{13}	—	February 5, 2003	Haleakala	NEAT	TIR	3.2 km	MPC · JPL
211466	2003 CL_{14}	—	February 3, 2003	Palomar	NEAT	(8737)	4.0 km	MPC · JPL
211467	2003 CN_{15}	—	February 4, 2003	Haleakala	NEAT	·	5.4 km	MPC · JPL
211468	2003 CS_{21}	—	February 2, 2003	Anderson Mesa	LONEOS	·	3.7 km	MPC · JPL
211469	2003 DS_{3}	—	February 22, 2003	Palomar	NEAT	·	4.5 km	MPC · JPL
211470	2003 DA_{15}	—	February 25, 2003	Campo Imperatore	CINEOS	·	5.0 km	MPC · JPL
211471	2003 DS_{18}	—	February 21, 2003	Palomar	NEAT	VER	5.0 km	MPC · JPL
211472	2003 DL_{24}	—	February 21, 2003	Palomar	NEAT	TIR ·	7.3 km	MPC · JPL
211473 Herin	2003 ER_{1}	Herin	March 4, 2003	St. Véran	St. Veran	AGN	1.7 km	MPC · JPL
211474	2003 EF_{19}	—	March 6, 2003	Anderson Mesa	LONEOS	·	4.5 km	MPC · JPL
211475	2003 ED_{23}	—	March 6, 2003	Socorro	LINEAR	·	4.6 km	MPC · JPL
211476	2003 EX_{37}	—	March 8, 2003	Anderson Mesa	LONEOS	·	6.7 km	MPC · JPL
211477	2003 ET_{52}	—	March 8, 2003	Socorro	LINEAR	(22805)	7.4 km	MPC · JPL
211478	2003 EA_{55}	—	March 8, 2003	Palomar	NEAT	EOS	3.0 km	MPC · JPL
211479	2003 ET_{59}	—	March 13, 2003	Socorro	LINEAR	·	6.3 km	MPC · JPL
211480	2003 FC_{7}	—	March 26, 2003	Wrightwood	J. W. Young	KOR	1.9 km	MPC · JPL
211481	2003 FT_{18}	—	March 24, 2003	Kitt Peak	Spacewatch	·	2.1 km	MPC · JPL
211482	2003 FN_{19}	—	March 25, 2003	Palomar	NEAT	EOS	3.3 km	MPC · JPL
211483	2003 FC_{84}	—	March 28, 2003	Kitt Peak	Spacewatch	·	4.7 km	MPC · JPL
211484	2003 FP_{89}	—	March 29, 2003	Anderson Mesa	LONEOS	VER	4.1 km	MPC · JPL
211485	2003 FU_{106}	—	March 27, 2003	Anderson Mesa	LONEOS	·	3.5 km	MPC · JPL
211486	2003 GK_{39}	—	April 6, 2003	Anderson Mesa	LONEOS	EUP	4.4 km	MPC · JPL
211487	2003 GL_{47}	—	April 7, 2003	Kitt Peak	Spacewatch	·	2.4 km	MPC · JPL
211488	2003 HA_{44}	—	April 27, 2003	Anderson Mesa	LONEOS	·	1.9 km	MPC · JPL
211489	2003 KP	—	May 22, 2003	Wrightwood	J. W. Young	·	870 m	MPC · JPL
211490	2003 MZ	—	June 22, 2003	Anderson Mesa	LONEOS	·	910 m	MPC · JPL
211491	2003 NQ_{6}	—	July 3, 2003	Socorro	LINEAR	·	1.1 km	MPC · JPL
211492	2003 NE_{7}	—	July 7, 2003	Reedy Creek	J. Broughton	·	1.5 km	MPC · JPL
211493	2003 NL_{9}	—	July 1, 2003	Socorro	LINEAR	·	950 m	MPC · JPL
211494	2003 NO_{10}	—	July 3, 2003	Kitt Peak	Spacewatch	·	780 m	MPC · JPL
211495	2003 OM_{7}	—	July 25, 2003	Palomar	NEAT	·	1.1 km	MPC · JPL
211496	2003 OD_{9}	—	July 23, 2003	Palomar	NEAT	PHO	1.4 km	MPC · JPL
211497	2003 OW_{19}	—	July 31, 2003	Haleakala	NEAT	·	1.7 km	MPC · JPL
211498	2003 PA_{6}	—	August 1, 2003	Socorro	LINEAR	·	1.2 km	MPC · JPL
211499	2003 PM_{7}	—	August 1, 2003	Haleakala	NEAT	·	2.8 km	MPC · JPL
211500	2003 PD_{9}	—	August 4, 2003	Socorro	LINEAR	·	1.4 km	MPC · JPL

== 211501–211600 ==
back to top

Designation			Discovery			Properties		Ref
Permanent	Provisional	Named after	Date	Site	Discoverer(s)	Category	Diam.	Ref
211501	2003 QX_{2}	—	August 19, 2003	Campo Imperatore	CINEOS	V	710 m	MPC · JPL
211502	2003 QL_{11}	—	August 21, 2003	Haleakala	NEAT	·	1.1 km	MPC · JPL
211503	2003 QO_{11}	—	August 21, 2003	Haleakala	NEAT	·	1.2 km	MPC · JPL
211504	2003 QG_{15}	—	August 20, 2003	Palomar	NEAT	·	1.1 km	MPC · JPL
211505	2003 QU_{17}	—	August 22, 2003	Palomar	NEAT	·	1.8 km	MPC · JPL
211506	2003 QG_{20}	—	August 22, 2003	Palomar	NEAT	·	1.4 km	MPC · JPL
211507	2003 QP_{26}	—	August 22, 2003	Haleakala	NEAT	PHO	1.9 km	MPC · JPL
211508	2003 QR_{26}	—	August 22, 2003	Haleakala	NEAT	·	1.3 km	MPC · JPL
211509	2003 QD_{33}	—	August 22, 2003	Campo Imperatore	CINEOS	ERI	3.1 km	MPC · JPL
211510	2003 QP_{38}	—	August 22, 2003	Socorro	LINEAR	·	1.2 km	MPC · JPL
211511	2003 QG_{40}	—	August 22, 2003	Socorro	LINEAR	·	1.8 km	MPC · JPL
211512	2003 QW_{43}	—	August 22, 2003	Palomar	NEAT	·	1.0 km	MPC · JPL
211513	2003 QB_{44}	—	August 22, 2003	Haleakala	NEAT	NYS ·	1.7 km	MPC · JPL
211514	2003 QK_{50}	—	August 22, 2003	Palomar	NEAT	·	1.9 km	MPC · JPL
211515	2003 QE_{51}	—	August 22, 2003	Palomar	NEAT	·	1.8 km	MPC · JPL
211516	2003 QQ_{51}	—	August 23, 2003	Palomar	NEAT	·	1.6 km	MPC · JPL
211517	2003 QV_{51}	—	August 23, 2003	Palomar	NEAT	·	1.7 km	MPC · JPL
211518	2003 QK_{55}	—	August 23, 2003	Socorro	LINEAR	·	1.0 km	MPC · JPL
211519	2003 QP_{55}	—	August 23, 2003	Socorro	LINEAR	·	1.5 km	MPC · JPL
211520	2003 QY_{56}	—	August 23, 2003	Socorro	LINEAR	·	1.1 km	MPC · JPL
211521	2003 QO_{59}	—	August 23, 2003	Socorro	LINEAR	V	920 m	MPC · JPL
211522	2003 QZ_{59}	—	August 23, 2003	Socorro	LINEAR	·	1.6 km	MPC · JPL
211523	2003 QX_{60}	—	August 23, 2003	Socorro	LINEAR	·	1.4 km	MPC · JPL
211524	2003 QE_{67}	—	August 23, 2003	Socorro	LINEAR	·	1.4 km	MPC · JPL
211525	2003 QF_{67}	—	August 23, 2003	Socorro	LINEAR	NYS	1.9 km	MPC · JPL
211526	2003 QO_{73}	—	August 25, 2003	Socorro	LINEAR	·	1.6 km	MPC · JPL
211527	2003 QU_{74}	—	August 24, 2003	Socorro	LINEAR	·	1.5 km	MPC · JPL
211528	2003 QQ_{93}	—	August 28, 2003	Haleakala	NEAT	·	1.0 km	MPC · JPL
211529	2003 QU_{96}	—	August 30, 2003	Kitt Peak	Spacewatch	·	1.7 km	MPC · JPL
211530	2003 QD_{100}	—	August 28, 2003	Palomar	NEAT	·	980 m	MPC · JPL
211531	2003 QV_{103}	—	August 31, 2003	Haleakala	NEAT	·	1.6 km	MPC · JPL
211532	2003 QQ_{104}	—	August 29, 2003	Socorro	LINEAR	·	1.6 km	MPC · JPL
211533	2003 QH_{108}	—	August 31, 2003	Socorro	LINEAR	·	2.1 km	MPC · JPL
211534	2003 RX_{2}	—	September 1, 2003	Socorro	LINEAR	·	1.3 km	MPC · JPL
211535	2003 RY_{8}	—	September 1, 2003	Socorro	LINEAR	·	1.3 km	MPC · JPL
211536	2003 RR_{11}	—	September 15, 2003	Wrightwood	J. W. Young	V	800 m	MPC · JPL
211537	2003 RL_{12}	—	September 14, 2003	Palomar	NEAT	·	3.6 km	MPC · JPL
211538	2003 RD_{18}	—	September 15, 2003	Palomar	NEAT	HNS	1.9 km	MPC · JPL
211539	2003 RD_{19}	—	September 15, 2003	Anderson Mesa	LONEOS	·	1.5 km	MPC · JPL
211540	2003 RA_{20}	—	September 15, 2003	Anderson Mesa	LONEOS	MAS	820 m	MPC · JPL
211541	2003 RA_{21}	—	September 15, 2003	Anderson Mesa	LONEOS	·	1.9 km	MPC · JPL
211542	2003 SU_{15}	—	September 16, 2003	Kitt Peak	Spacewatch	·	1.7 km	MPC · JPL
211543	2003 SV_{15}	—	September 16, 2003	Kitt Peak	Spacewatch	·	2.0 km	MPC · JPL
211544	2003 SM_{24}	—	September 17, 2003	Socorro	LINEAR	·	2.0 km	MPC · JPL
211545	2003 SF_{26}	—	September 17, 2003	Haleakala	NEAT	·	1.5 km	MPC · JPL
211546	2003 SN_{40}	—	September 16, 2003	Palomar	NEAT	(2076)	2.0 km	MPC · JPL
211547	2003 SJ_{44}	—	September 16, 2003	Anderson Mesa	LONEOS	·	1.8 km	MPC · JPL
211548	2003 SU_{44}	—	September 16, 2003	Anderson Mesa	LONEOS	·	1.4 km	MPC · JPL
211549	2003 SL_{46}	—	September 16, 2003	Anderson Mesa	LONEOS	·	1.2 km	MPC · JPL
211550	2003 SV_{46}	—	September 16, 2003	Anderson Mesa	LONEOS	·	1.8 km	MPC · JPL
211551	2003 SJ_{51}	—	September 18, 2003	Palomar	NEAT	NYS	1.8 km	MPC · JPL
211552	2003 SO_{52}	—	September 18, 2003	Palomar	NEAT	·	2.0 km	MPC · JPL
211553	2003 SX_{52}	—	September 19, 2003	Palomar	NEAT	·	1.8 km	MPC · JPL
211554	2003 SB_{56}	—	September 16, 2003	Anderson Mesa	LONEOS	V	950 m	MPC · JPL
211555	2003 SM_{57}	—	September 16, 2003	Kitt Peak	Spacewatch	·	2.0 km	MPC · JPL
211556	2003 SW_{58}	—	September 17, 2003	Anderson Mesa	LONEOS	·	2.2 km	MPC · JPL
211557	2003 SG_{72}	—	September 18, 2003	Kitt Peak	Spacewatch	V	950 m	MPC · JPL
211558	2003 SP_{83}	—	September 18, 2003	Kitt Peak	Spacewatch	·	1.8 km	MPC · JPL
211559	2003 SN_{91}	—	September 18, 2003	Palomar	NEAT	·	2.3 km	MPC · JPL
211560	2003 SB_{94}	—	September 18, 2003	Kitt Peak	Spacewatch	·	2.3 km	MPC · JPL
211561	2003 SQ_{94}	—	September 19, 2003	Campo Imperatore	CINEOS	·	1.2 km	MPC · JPL
211562	2003 SV_{95}	—	September 19, 2003	Palomar	NEAT	·	1.7 km	MPC · JPL
211563	2003 SU_{103}	—	September 20, 2003	Socorro	LINEAR	NYS	1.5 km	MPC · JPL
211564	2003 SO_{107}	—	September 20, 2003	Palomar	NEAT	·	1.6 km	MPC · JPL
211565	2003 ST_{120}	—	September 17, 2003	Goodricke-Pigott	R. A. Tucker	NYS	1.5 km	MPC · JPL
211566	2003 SE_{123}	—	September 18, 2003	Socorro	LINEAR	·	1.2 km	MPC · JPL
211567	2003 SH_{126}	—	September 19, 2003	Kitt Peak	Spacewatch	NYS	1.8 km	MPC · JPL
211568	2003 SS_{129}	—	September 21, 2003	Desert Eagle	W. K. Y. Yeung	·	1.5 km	MPC · JPL
211569	2003 SF_{139}	—	September 20, 2003	Uccle	T. Pauwels	JUN	1.7 km	MPC · JPL
211570	2003 SP_{150}	—	September 17, 2003	Socorro	LINEAR	V	980 m	MPC · JPL
211571	2003 SB_{152}	—	September 19, 2003	Anderson Mesa	LONEOS	·	1.7 km	MPC · JPL
211572	2003 SF_{157}	—	September 19, 2003	Anderson Mesa	LONEOS	·	1.2 km	MPC · JPL
211573	2003 SV_{160}	—	September 17, 2003	Kitt Peak	Spacewatch	·	1.2 km	MPC · JPL
211574	2003 SQ_{161}	—	September 18, 2003	Palomar	NEAT	·	1.8 km	MPC · JPL
211575	2003 SV_{161}	—	September 18, 2003	Palomar	NEAT	·	1.7 km	MPC · JPL
211576	2003 SL_{167}	—	September 22, 2003	Kitt Peak	Spacewatch	(5)	2.1 km	MPC · JPL
211577	2003 SC_{169}	—	September 23, 2003	Haleakala	NEAT	(883)	1.5 km	MPC · JPL
211578	2003 SV_{175}	—	September 18, 2003	Palomar	NEAT	(2076)	1.4 km	MPC · JPL
211579	2003 SB_{177}	—	September 18, 2003	Palomar	NEAT	·	1.1 km	MPC · JPL
211580	2003 SB_{181}	—	September 20, 2003	Socorro	LINEAR	·	1.8 km	MPC · JPL
211581	2003 SF_{181}	—	September 20, 2003	Socorro	LINEAR	NYS	1.7 km	MPC · JPL
211582	2003 SL_{181}	—	September 20, 2003	Socorro	LINEAR	·	1.4 km	MPC · JPL
211583	2003 SA_{183}	—	September 21, 2003	Anderson Mesa	LONEOS	·	1.1 km	MPC · JPL
211584	2003 SL_{185}	—	September 22, 2003	Anderson Mesa	LONEOS	·	1.3 km	MPC · JPL
211585	2003 SM_{227}	—	September 27, 2003	Socorro	LINEAR	·	1.3 km	MPC · JPL
211586	2003 SQ_{227}	—	September 27, 2003	Socorro	LINEAR	·	1.5 km	MPC · JPL
211587	2003 SX_{227}	—	September 27, 2003	Socorro	LINEAR	·	1.8 km	MPC · JPL
211588	2003 SP_{229}	—	September 27, 2003	Kitt Peak	Spacewatch	·	1.3 km	MPC · JPL
211589	2003 SV_{232}	—	September 25, 2003	Haleakala	NEAT	·	1.4 km	MPC · JPL
211590	2003 SP_{247}	—	September 26, 2003	Socorro	LINEAR	NYS	2.1 km	MPC · JPL
211591	2003 SJ_{249}	—	September 26, 2003	Socorro	LINEAR	V	1.2 km	MPC · JPL
211592	2003 SK_{252}	—	September 26, 2003	Socorro	LINEAR	·	2.5 km	MPC · JPL
211593	2003 SE_{259}	—	September 28, 2003	Kitt Peak	Spacewatch	·	1.8 km	MPC · JPL
211594	2003 SV_{259}	—	September 28, 2003	Kitt Peak	Spacewatch	NYS	1.3 km	MPC · JPL
211595	2003 SQ_{269}	—	September 28, 2003	Goodricke-Pigott	R. A. Tucker	NYS	1.6 km	MPC · JPL
211596	2003 SW_{270}	—	September 25, 2003	Palomar	NEAT	·	1.8 km	MPC · JPL
211597	2003 ST_{271}	—	September 26, 2003	Socorro	LINEAR	·	2.5 km	MPC · JPL
211598	2003 SB_{291}	—	September 29, 2003	Socorro	LINEAR	·	3.1 km	MPC · JPL
211599	2003 SS_{291}	—	September 30, 2003	Socorro	LINEAR	·	1.9 km	MPC · JPL
211600	2003 SR_{300}	—	September 17, 2003	Palomar	NEAT	V	1.1 km	MPC · JPL

== 211601–211700 ==
back to top

Designation			Discovery			Properties		Ref
Permanent	Provisional	Named after	Date	Site	Discoverer(s)	Category	Diam.	Ref
211601	2003 SA_{310}	—	September 28, 2003	Socorro	LINEAR	·	1.4 km	MPC · JPL
211602	2003 SQ_{320}	—	September 18, 2003	Kitt Peak	Spacewatch	·	1.8 km	MPC · JPL
211603	2003 SV_{321}	—	September 22, 2003	Kitt Peak	Spacewatch	V	760 m	MPC · JPL
211604	2003 SC_{407}	—	September 27, 2003	Apache Point	SDSS	·	1.8 km	MPC · JPL
211605	2003 SK_{423}	—	September 22, 2003	Kitt Peak	Spacewatch	CLA	2.1 km	MPC · JPL
211606	2003 SN_{423}	—	September 28, 2003	Kitt Peak	Spacewatch	·	1.6 km	MPC · JPL
211607	2003 TE_{16}	—	October 15, 2003	Anderson Mesa	LONEOS	·	2.4 km	MPC · JPL
211608	2003 TQ_{17}	—	October 15, 2003	Palomar	NEAT	·	1.4 km	MPC · JPL
211609	2003 TT_{20}	—	October 15, 2003	Anderson Mesa	LONEOS	V	940 m	MPC · JPL
211610	2003 TH_{39}	—	October 2, 2003	Kitt Peak	Spacewatch	·	2.0 km	MPC · JPL
211611	2003 UY_{5}	—	October 16, 2003	Anderson Mesa	LONEOS	·	1.4 km	MPC · JPL
211612	2003 UA_{30}	—	October 18, 2003	Kitt Peak	Spacewatch	·	2.7 km	MPC · JPL
211613 Christophelovis	2003 UB_{30}	Christophelovis	October 25, 2003	Vicques	M. Ory	·	2.1 km	MPC · JPL
211614	2003 UF_{40}	—	October 16, 2003	Kitt Peak	Spacewatch	·	1.8 km	MPC · JPL
211615	2003 UJ_{48}	—	October 16, 2003	Anderson Mesa	LONEOS	·	1.9 km	MPC · JPL
211616	2003 UW_{51}	—	October 18, 2003	Palomar	NEAT	·	3.8 km	MPC · JPL
211617	2003 UO_{59}	—	October 17, 2003	Anderson Mesa	LONEOS	ADE	2.7 km	MPC · JPL
211618	2003 UH_{61}	—	October 16, 2003	Anderson Mesa	LONEOS	·	1.8 km	MPC · JPL
211619	2003 UT_{62}	—	October 16, 2003	Anderson Mesa	LONEOS	·	1.6 km	MPC · JPL
211620	2003 UK_{63}	—	October 16, 2003	Palomar	NEAT	·	1.5 km	MPC · JPL
211621	2003 UL_{73}	—	October 19, 2003	Kitt Peak	Spacewatch	·	1.8 km	MPC · JPL
211622	2003 UQ_{106}	—	October 18, 2003	Palomar	NEAT	·	2.4 km	MPC · JPL
211623	2003 UN_{112}	—	October 20, 2003	Socorro	LINEAR	V	1.3 km	MPC · JPL
211624	2003 UB_{117}	—	October 21, 2003	Socorro	LINEAR	·	2.2 km	MPC · JPL
211625	2003 UL_{119}	—	October 18, 2003	Kitt Peak	Spacewatch	·	1.7 km	MPC · JPL
211626	2003 UK_{121}	—	October 19, 2003	Palomar	NEAT	PHO	2.6 km	MPC · JPL
211627	2003 UO_{122}	—	October 19, 2003	Kitt Peak	Spacewatch	(5)	1.3 km	MPC · JPL
211628	2003 UM_{128}	—	October 21, 2003	Kitt Peak	Spacewatch	NYS	1.4 km	MPC · JPL
211629	2003 UR_{129}	—	October 18, 2003	Palomar	NEAT	·	1.7 km	MPC · JPL
211630	2003 UE_{135}	—	October 21, 2003	Anderson Mesa	LONEOS	·	1.6 km	MPC · JPL
211631	2003 UH_{136}	—	October 21, 2003	Socorro	LINEAR	·	1.3 km	MPC · JPL
211632	2003 UQ_{136}	—	October 21, 2003	Socorro	LINEAR	·	1.6 km	MPC · JPL
211633	2003 UE_{141}	—	October 18, 2003	Anderson Mesa	LONEOS	·	1.3 km	MPC · JPL
211634	2003 UX_{143}	—	October 18, 2003	Anderson Mesa	LONEOS	·	1.5 km	MPC · JPL
211635	2003 US_{157}	—	October 20, 2003	Kitt Peak	Spacewatch	·	1.6 km	MPC · JPL
211636	2003 UF_{162}	—	October 21, 2003	Socorro	LINEAR	·	1.8 km	MPC · JPL
211637	2003 UD_{168}	—	October 22, 2003	Socorro	LINEAR	(5)	1.8 km	MPC · JPL
211638	2003 UG_{170}	—	October 22, 2003	Kitt Peak	Spacewatch	·	1.9 km	MPC · JPL
211639	2003 UU_{180}	—	October 21, 2003	Socorro	LINEAR	(5)	1.8 km	MPC · JPL
211640	2003 UV_{180}	—	October 21, 2003	Socorro	LINEAR	·	1.3 km	MPC · JPL
211641	2003 UH_{189}	—	October 22, 2003	Kitt Peak	Spacewatch	·	2.1 km	MPC · JPL
211642	2003 UE_{190}	—	October 22, 2003	Kitt Peak	Spacewatch	MAS	1.2 km	MPC · JPL
211643	2003 UJ_{209}	—	October 23, 2003	Anderson Mesa	LONEOS	·	1.2 km	MPC · JPL
211644	2003 UG_{211}	—	October 23, 2003	Kitt Peak	Spacewatch	MIS	2.7 km	MPC · JPL
211645	2003 UB_{212}	—	October 23, 2003	Kitt Peak	Spacewatch	·	1.3 km	MPC · JPL
211646	2003 UA_{216}	—	October 21, 2003	Kitt Peak	Spacewatch	·	2.3 km	MPC · JPL
211647	2003 UW_{217}	—	October 21, 2003	Socorro	LINEAR	·	1.9 km	MPC · JPL
211648	2003 UV_{219}	—	October 21, 2003	Palomar	NEAT	·	1.1 km	MPC · JPL
211649	2003 UK_{220}	—	October 21, 2003	Kitt Peak	Spacewatch	·	1.5 km	MPC · JPL
211650	2003 UL_{226}	—	October 22, 2003	Kitt Peak	Spacewatch	·	3.9 km	MPC · JPL
211651	2003 UT_{233}	—	October 24, 2003	Socorro	LINEAR	·	1.8 km	MPC · JPL
211652	2003 UV_{238}	—	October 24, 2003	Socorro	LINEAR	·	1.6 km	MPC · JPL
211653	2003 UY_{240}	—	October 24, 2003	Kitt Peak	Spacewatch	·	1.5 km	MPC · JPL
211654	2003 UP_{246}	—	October 24, 2003	Socorro	LINEAR	·	1.9 km	MPC · JPL
211655	2003 UT_{246}	—	October 24, 2003	Socorro	LINEAR	·	2.9 km	MPC · JPL
211656	2003 UT_{254}	—	October 24, 2003	Kitt Peak	Spacewatch	(5)	1.3 km	MPC · JPL
211657	2003 UT_{263}	—	October 27, 2003	Socorro	LINEAR	BRG	1.6 km	MPC · JPL
211658	2003 UW_{274}	—	October 30, 2003	Haleakala	NEAT	KON	3.7 km	MPC · JPL
211659	2003 UC_{279}	—	October 26, 2003	Kitt Peak	Spacewatch	·	1.9 km	MPC · JPL
211660	2003 UD_{282}	—	October 29, 2003	Anderson Mesa	LONEOS	·	1.5 km	MPC · JPL
211661	2003 UZ_{315}	—	October 21, 2003	Socorro	LINEAR	·	1.4 km	MPC · JPL
211662	2003 UA_{324}	—	October 17, 2003	Kitt Peak	Spacewatch	·	2.2 km	MPC · JPL
211663	2003 UK_{327}	—	October 17, 2003	Apache Point	SDSS	·	1.1 km	MPC · JPL
211664	2003 UG_{381}	—	October 22, 2003	Apache Point	SDSS	·	1.3 km	MPC · JPL
211665	2003 VQ_{4}	—	November 15, 2003	Kitt Peak	Spacewatch	·	1.8 km	MPC · JPL
211666	2003 VW_{7}	—	November 3, 2003	Socorro	LINEAR	EUN	1.5 km	MPC · JPL
211667	2003 VU_{9}	—	November 15, 2003	Needville	J. Dellinger	·	1.7 km	MPC · JPL
211668	2003 VH_{11}	—	November 15, 2003	Palomar	NEAT	(5)	1.5 km	MPC · JPL
211669	2003 VL_{11}	—	November 15, 2003	Palomar	NEAT	(5)	1.6 km	MPC · JPL
211670	2003 WZ_{16}	—	November 18, 2003	Palomar	NEAT	·	2.8 km	MPC · JPL
211671	2003 WK_{21}	—	November 19, 2003	Kitt Peak	Spacewatch	·	2.5 km	MPC · JPL
211672	2003 WX_{28}	—	November 18, 2003	Kitt Peak	Spacewatch	(2076)	1.2 km	MPC · JPL
211673	2003 WZ_{31}	—	November 18, 2003	Palomar	NEAT	·	2.2 km	MPC · JPL
211674	2003 WS_{32}	—	November 18, 2003	Kitt Peak	Spacewatch	·	1.8 km	MPC · JPL
211675	2003 WD_{33}	—	November 18, 2003	Palomar	NEAT	·	2.8 km	MPC · JPL
211676	2003 WZ_{53}	—	November 20, 2003	Socorro	LINEAR	(5)	1.3 km	MPC · JPL
211677	2003 WU_{55}	—	November 20, 2003	Socorro	LINEAR	·	1.7 km	MPC · JPL
211678	2003 WN_{64}	—	November 19, 2003	Kitt Peak	Spacewatch	·	1.2 km	MPC · JPL
211679	2003 WB_{69}	—	November 19, 2003	Kitt Peak	Spacewatch	JUN	1.6 km	MPC · JPL
211680	2003 WT_{70}	—	November 20, 2003	Palomar	NEAT	MAR	1.7 km	MPC · JPL
211681	2003 WG_{71}	—	November 20, 2003	Socorro	LINEAR	·	1.8 km	MPC · JPL
211682	2003 WZ_{71}	—	November 20, 2003	Socorro	LINEAR	EUN	2.0 km	MPC · JPL
211683	2003 WC_{81}	—	November 20, 2003	Socorro	LINEAR	(5)	2.1 km	MPC · JPL
211684	2003 WA_{90}	—	November 16, 2003	Kitt Peak	Spacewatch	·	1.1 km	MPC · JPL
211685	2003 WK_{101}	—	November 21, 2003	Socorro	LINEAR	·	4.3 km	MPC · JPL
211686	2003 WT_{105}	—	November 21, 2003	Socorro	LINEAR	·	2.1 km	MPC · JPL
211687	2003 WJ_{106}	—	November 21, 2003	Socorro	LINEAR	·	1.9 km	MPC · JPL
211688	2003 WE_{108}	—	November 20, 2003	Socorro	LINEAR	·	2.3 km	MPC · JPL
211689	2003 WR_{111}	—	November 20, 2003	Socorro	LINEAR	(5)	1.6 km	MPC · JPL
211690	2003 WC_{118}	—	November 20, 2003	Socorro	LINEAR	·	1.9 km	MPC · JPL
211691	2003 WQ_{119}	—	November 20, 2003	Socorro	LINEAR	(5)	1.8 km	MPC · JPL
211692	2003 WA_{127}	—	November 20, 2003	Socorro	LINEAR	EUN	2.0 km	MPC · JPL
211693	2003 WY_{133}	—	November 21, 2003	Socorro	LINEAR	·	1.3 km	MPC · JPL
211694	2003 WS_{137}	—	November 21, 2003	Socorro	LINEAR	·	1.9 km	MPC · JPL
211695	2003 WW_{137}	—	November 21, 2003	Socorro	LINEAR	·	2.5 km	MPC · JPL
211696	2003 WN_{142}	—	November 21, 2003	Palomar	NEAT	·	1.6 km	MPC · JPL
211697	2003 WR_{145}	—	November 21, 2003	Palomar	NEAT	ADE	2.9 km	MPC · JPL
211698	2003 WW_{145}	—	November 21, 2003	Socorro	LINEAR	·	1.5 km	MPC · JPL
211699	2003 WS_{146}	—	November 23, 2003	Socorro	LINEAR	·	2.4 km	MPC · JPL
211700	2003 WX_{147}	—	November 23, 2003	Kitt Peak	Spacewatch	·	2.4 km	MPC · JPL

== 211701–211800 ==
back to top

Designation			Discovery			Properties		Ref
Permanent	Provisional	Named after	Date	Site	Discoverer(s)	Category	Diam.	Ref
211701	2003 WD_{153}	—	November 26, 2003	Anderson Mesa	LONEOS	·	2.2 km	MPC · JPL
211702	2003 WK_{169}	—	November 19, 2003	Palomar	NEAT	EUN	1.5 km	MPC · JPL
211703	2003 XB_{1}	—	December 1, 2003	Kitt Peak	Spacewatch	·	1.8 km	MPC · JPL
211704	2003 XE_{2}	—	December 1, 2003	Socorro	LINEAR	·	2.1 km	MPC · JPL
211705	2003 XD_{4}	—	December 1, 2003	Socorro	LINEAR	(5)	1.6 km	MPC · JPL
211706	2003 XB_{6}	—	December 3, 2003	Socorro	LINEAR	·	2.3 km	MPC · JPL
211707	2003 XZ_{6}	—	December 3, 2003	Anderson Mesa	LONEOS	·	6.8 km	MPC · JPL
211708	2003 XB_{10}	—	December 4, 2003	Socorro	LINEAR	JUN	1.7 km	MPC · JPL
211709	2003 XQ_{16}	—	December 14, 2003	Palomar	NEAT	·	2.7 km	MPC · JPL
211710	2003 XD_{18}	—	December 14, 2003	Palomar	NEAT	HNS	1.8 km	MPC · JPL
211711	2003 YF_{1}	—	December 17, 2003	Socorro	LINEAR	·	8.1 km	MPC · JPL
211712	2003 YH_{3}	—	December 19, 2003	Kingsnake	J. V. McClusky	·	2.9 km	MPC · JPL
211713	2003 YR_{16}	—	December 17, 2003	Kitt Peak	Spacewatch	·	7.9 km	MPC · JPL
211714	2003 YT_{19}	—	December 17, 2003	Kitt Peak	Spacewatch	·	2.9 km	MPC · JPL
211715	2003 YT_{25}	—	December 18, 2003	Socorro	LINEAR	MIS	4.0 km	MPC · JPL
211716	2003 YA_{28}	—	December 17, 2003	Palomar	NEAT	·	3.7 km	MPC · JPL
211717	2003 YV_{35}	—	December 19, 2003	Socorro	LINEAR	·	3.3 km	MPC · JPL
211718	2003 YH_{37}	—	December 17, 2003	Kitt Peak	Spacewatch	AGN	1.5 km	MPC · JPL
211719	2003 YK_{38}	—	December 19, 2003	Kitt Peak	Spacewatch	·	1.6 km	MPC · JPL
211720	2003 YX_{38}	—	December 19, 2003	Socorro	LINEAR	·	3.7 km	MPC · JPL
211721	2003 YF_{40}	—	December 19, 2003	Kitt Peak	Spacewatch	NEM	2.9 km	MPC · JPL
211722	2003 YB_{44}	—	December 19, 2003	Kitt Peak	Spacewatch	·	2.9 km	MPC · JPL
211723	2003 YC_{53}	—	December 19, 2003	Kitt Peak	Spacewatch	(5)	2.2 km	MPC · JPL
211724	2003 YA_{60}	—	December 19, 2003	Kitt Peak	Spacewatch	·	1.7 km	MPC · JPL
211725	2003 YO_{66}	—	December 20, 2003	Socorro	LINEAR	MAR	1.7 km	MPC · JPL
211726	2003 YY_{73}	—	December 18, 2003	Socorro	LINEAR	(5)	1.7 km	MPC · JPL
211727	2003 YS_{77}	—	December 18, 2003	Socorro	LINEAR	·	2.1 km	MPC · JPL
211728	2003 YQ_{82}	—	December 18, 2003	Kitt Peak	Spacewatch	(5)	1.9 km	MPC · JPL
211729	2003 YS_{91}	—	December 20, 2003	Palomar	NEAT	·	2.8 km	MPC · JPL
211730	2003 YR_{101}	—	December 19, 2003	Socorro	LINEAR	EUP	6.0 km	MPC · JPL
211731	2003 YF_{104}	—	December 21, 2003	Socorro	LINEAR	EUN	2.3 km	MPC · JPL
211732	2003 YS_{105}	—	December 22, 2003	Socorro	LINEAR	EUP	5.2 km	MPC · JPL
211733	2003 YJ_{109}	—	December 22, 2003	Socorro	LINEAR	·	2.9 km	MPC · JPL
211734	2003 YT_{118}	—	December 27, 2003	Kitt Peak	Spacewatch	·	2.4 km	MPC · JPL
211735	2003 YE_{121}	—	December 27, 2003	Socorro	LINEAR	·	2.6 km	MPC · JPL
211736	2003 YK_{122}	—	December 27, 2003	Kitt Peak	Spacewatch	·	2.1 km	MPC · JPL
211737	2003 YR_{125}	—	December 27, 2003	Socorro	LINEAR	·	2.2 km	MPC · JPL
211738	2003 YV_{136}	—	December 25, 2003	Socorro	LINEAR	·	2.3 km	MPC · JPL
211739	2003 YD_{138}	—	December 27, 2003	Kitt Peak	Spacewatch	MAS	820 m	MPC · JPL
211740	2003 YN_{144}	—	December 28, 2003	Socorro	LINEAR	·	1.8 km	MPC · JPL
211741	2003 YN_{147}	—	December 29, 2003	Socorro	LINEAR	·	3.4 km	MPC · JPL
211742	2003 YA_{149}	—	December 29, 2003	Catalina	CSS	EUN	1.9 km	MPC · JPL
211743	2003 YL_{149}	—	December 29, 2003	Catalina	CSS	·	3.6 km	MPC · JPL
211744	2003 YQ_{150}	—	December 29, 2003	Catalina	CSS	·	3.0 km	MPC · JPL
211745	2003 YO_{153}	—	December 29, 2003	Catalina	CSS	·	2.9 km	MPC · JPL
211746	2003 YM_{156}	—	December 16, 2003	Catalina	CSS	·	2.0 km	MPC · JPL
211747	2003 YL_{162}	—	December 17, 2003	Palomar	NEAT	EUN	1.7 km	MPC · JPL
211748	2003 YW_{180}	—	December 17, 2003	Kitt Peak	Spacewatch	·	2.7 km	MPC · JPL
211749	2003 YY_{180}	—	December 18, 2003	Socorro	LINEAR	·	1.9 km	MPC · JPL
211750	2004 AC_{2}	—	January 13, 2004	Anderson Mesa	LONEOS	·	2.3 km	MPC · JPL
211751	2004 AP_{3}	—	January 13, 2004	Anderson Mesa	LONEOS	·	2.6 km	MPC · JPL
211752	2004 AK_{9}	—	January 14, 2004	Palomar	NEAT	·	2.5 km	MPC · JPL
211753	2004 AL_{9}	—	January 14, 2004	Palomar	NEAT	·	2.6 km	MPC · JPL
211754	2004 AR_{16}	—	January 15, 2004	Kitt Peak	Spacewatch	·	2.2 km	MPC · JPL
211755	2004 BU_{2}	—	January 16, 2004	Palomar	NEAT	·	2.3 km	MPC · JPL
211756	2004 BT_{4}	—	January 16, 2004	Palomar	NEAT	·	2.0 km	MPC · JPL
211757	2004 BU_{11}	—	January 16, 2004	Palomar	NEAT	AEO	1.5 km	MPC · JPL
211758	2004 BF_{12}	—	January 16, 2004	Palomar	NEAT	·	3.1 km	MPC · JPL
211759	2004 BC_{16}	—	January 18, 2004	Palomar	NEAT	·	3.2 km	MPC · JPL
211760	2004 BB_{17}	—	January 17, 2004	Palomar	NEAT	·	2.5 km	MPC · JPL
211761	2004 BR_{21}	—	January 19, 2004	Anderson Mesa	LONEOS	NYS	1.4 km	MPC · JPL
211762	2004 BL_{27}	—	January 16, 2004	Kitt Peak	Spacewatch	·	1.9 km	MPC · JPL
211763	2004 BP_{45}	—	January 21, 2004	Socorro	LINEAR	·	2.8 km	MPC · JPL
211764	2004 BF_{47}	—	January 21, 2004	Socorro	LINEAR	·	2.7 km	MPC · JPL
211765	2004 BR_{49}	—	January 21, 2004	Socorro	LINEAR	·	1.8 km	MPC · JPL
211766	2004 BP_{52}	—	January 21, 2004	Socorro	LINEAR	·	1.8 km	MPC · JPL
211767	2004 BT_{52}	—	January 21, 2004	Socorro	LINEAR	·	2.8 km	MPC · JPL
211768	2004 BR_{53}	—	January 22, 2004	Socorro	LINEAR	·	2.8 km	MPC · JPL
211769	2004 BF_{55}	—	January 22, 2004	Socorro	LINEAR	WIT	1.5 km	MPC · JPL
211770	2004 BE_{77}	—	January 22, 2004	Socorro	LINEAR	·	2.1 km	MPC · JPL
211771	2004 BO_{80}	—	January 24, 2004	Socorro	LINEAR	·	3.1 km	MPC · JPL
211772	2004 BQ_{90}	—	January 24, 2004	Socorro	LINEAR	·	4.3 km	MPC · JPL
211773	2004 BF_{96}	—	January 24, 2004	Socorro	LINEAR	·	2.9 km	MPC · JPL
211774	2004 BA_{98}	—	January 27, 2004	Kitt Peak	Spacewatch	·	3.2 km	MPC · JPL
211775	2004 BE_{113}	—	January 27, 2004	Kitt Peak	Spacewatch	AGN	1.4 km	MPC · JPL
211776	2004 BD_{116}	—	January 26, 2004	Anderson Mesa	LONEOS	·	2.4 km	MPC · JPL
211777	2004 BJ_{117}	—	January 28, 2004	Catalina	CSS	·	3.8 km	MPC · JPL
211778	2004 BC_{121}	—	January 31, 2004	Socorro	LINEAR	·	3.9 km	MPC · JPL
211779	2004 BO_{131}	—	January 16, 2004	Kitt Peak	Spacewatch	·	1.7 km	MPC · JPL
211780	2004 BA_{132}	—	January 16, 2004	Kitt Peak	Spacewatch	·	2.0 km	MPC · JPL
211781	2004 BT_{137}	—	January 19, 2004	Kitt Peak	Spacewatch	·	1.8 km	MPC · JPL
211782	2004 BK_{141}	—	January 19, 2004	Kitt Peak	Spacewatch	·	1.9 km	MPC · JPL
211783	2004 BP_{149}	—	January 16, 2004	Kitt Peak	Spacewatch	·	2.1 km	MPC · JPL
211784	2004 CE_{19}	—	February 11, 2004	Kitt Peak	Spacewatch	·	2.1 km	MPC · JPL
211785	2004 CZ_{22}	—	February 12, 2004	Kitt Peak	Spacewatch	·	1.8 km	MPC · JPL
211786	2004 CW_{28}	—	February 12, 2004	Kitt Peak	Spacewatch	AGN	1.5 km	MPC · JPL
211787	2004 CJ_{44}	—	February 12, 2004	Kitt Peak	Spacewatch	·	2.7 km	MPC · JPL
211788	2004 CL_{45}	—	February 13, 2004	Kitt Peak	Spacewatch	·	3.1 km	MPC · JPL
211789	2004 CR_{58}	—	February 10, 2004	Palomar	NEAT	AEO	1.5 km	MPC · JPL
211790	2004 CB_{60}	—	February 11, 2004	Kitt Peak	Spacewatch	·	2.3 km	MPC · JPL
211791	2004 CL_{65}	—	February 14, 2004	Haleakala	NEAT	AEO	1.6 km	MPC · JPL
211792	2004 CF_{68}	—	February 11, 2004	Kitt Peak	Spacewatch	(12739)	2.8 km	MPC · JPL
211793	2004 CN_{69}	—	February 11, 2004	Palomar	NEAT	WIT	1.6 km	MPC · JPL
211794	2004 CY_{69}	—	February 11, 2004	Palomar	NEAT	·	2.9 km	MPC · JPL
211795	2004 CG_{94}	—	February 11, 2004	Palomar	NEAT	·	2.7 km	MPC · JPL
211796	2004 CC_{100}	—	February 15, 2004	Catalina	CSS	·	5.2 km	MPC · JPL
211797	2004 CR_{104}	—	February 13, 2004	Palomar	NEAT	GEF	2.2 km	MPC · JPL
211798	2004 CP_{113}	—	February 13, 2004	Anderson Mesa	LONEOS	·	2.2 km	MPC · JPL
211799	2004 CL_{120}	—	February 12, 2004	Kitt Peak	Spacewatch	EOS	2.9 km	MPC · JPL
211800	2004 CW_{120}	—	February 12, 2004	Kitt Peak	Spacewatch	WIT	1.5 km	MPC · JPL

== 211801–211900 ==
back to top

Designation			Discovery			Properties		Ref
Permanent	Provisional	Named after	Date	Site	Discoverer(s)	Category	Diam.	Ref
211801	2004 CW_{122}	—	February 12, 2004	Kitt Peak	Spacewatch	·	2.5 km	MPC · JPL
211802	2004 DG_{1}	—	February 17, 2004	Kitt Peak	Spacewatch	·	3.0 km	MPC · JPL
211803	2004 DX_{5}	—	February 16, 2004	Kitt Peak	Spacewatch	·	2.7 km	MPC · JPL
211804	2004 DF_{8}	—	February 17, 2004	Kitt Peak	Spacewatch	KOR	1.6 km	MPC · JPL
211805	2004 DK_{19}	—	February 17, 2004	Socorro	LINEAR	·	2.8 km	MPC · JPL
211806	2004 DP_{22}	—	February 18, 2004	Desert Eagle	W. K. Y. Yeung	·	2.7 km	MPC · JPL
211807	2004 DD_{26}	—	February 16, 2004	Socorro	LINEAR	·	3.0 km	MPC · JPL
211808	2004 DJ_{29}	—	February 17, 2004	Kitt Peak	Spacewatch	HOF	3.4 km	MPC · JPL
211809	2004 DO_{34}	—	February 19, 2004	Kvistaberg	Uppsala-DLR Asteroid Survey	·	2.9 km	MPC · JPL
211810	2004 DN_{39}	—	February 22, 2004	Kitt Peak	Spacewatch	·	2.4 km	MPC · JPL
211811	2004 DV_{42}	—	February 23, 2004	Socorro	LINEAR	·	2.6 km	MPC · JPL
211812	2004 DP_{51}	—	February 23, 2004	Socorro	LINEAR	·	3.7 km	MPC · JPL
211813	2004 DU_{57}	—	February 23, 2004	Socorro	LINEAR	·	2.4 km	MPC · JPL
211814	2004 DQ_{60}	—	February 26, 2004	Socorro	LINEAR	·	2.7 km	MPC · JPL
211815	2004 DC_{72}	—	February 16, 2004	Desert Eagle	W. K. Y. Yeung	·	2.6 km	MPC · JPL
211816	2004 EM_{5}	—	March 11, 2004	Palomar	NEAT	·	4.7 km	MPC · JPL
211817	2004 EN_{6}	—	March 12, 2004	Palomar	NEAT	·	3.9 km	MPC · JPL
211818	2004 EA_{7}	—	March 12, 2004	Palomar	NEAT	KOR	2.1 km	MPC · JPL
211819	2004 EX_{17}	—	March 12, 2004	Palomar	NEAT	·	5.4 km	MPC · JPL
211820	2004 EB_{18}	—	March 12, 2004	Palomar	NEAT	·	3.8 km	MPC · JPL
211821	2004 EP_{18}	—	March 13, 2004	Palomar	NEAT	EOS	3.1 km	MPC · JPL
211822	2004 EV_{20}	—	March 15, 2004	Socorro	LINEAR	H	980 m	MPC · JPL
211823	2004 EM_{22}	—	March 15, 2004	Campo Imperatore	CINEOS	·	3.0 km	MPC · JPL
211824	2004 EB_{23}	—	March 15, 2004	Catalina	CSS	·	3.0 km	MPC · JPL
211825	2004 ET_{26}	—	March 14, 2004	Kitt Peak	Spacewatch	·	2.0 km	MPC · JPL
211826	2004 EE_{44}	—	March 13, 2004	Palomar	NEAT	·	4.4 km	MPC · JPL
211827	2004 EX_{47}	—	March 15, 2004	Catalina	CSS	·	3.3 km	MPC · JPL
211828	2004 EY_{55}	—	March 14, 2004	Palomar	NEAT	·	3.0 km	MPC · JPL
211829	2004 EB_{60}	—	March 15, 2004	Palomar	NEAT	·	4.0 km	MPC · JPL
211830	2004 EC_{68}	—	March 15, 2004	Socorro	LINEAR	·	3.0 km	MPC · JPL
211831	2004 ES_{76}	—	March 15, 2004	Kitt Peak	Spacewatch	·	2.7 km	MPC · JPL
211832	2004 EN_{80}	—	March 14, 2004	Socorro	LINEAR	·	6.0 km	MPC · JPL
211833	2004 EE_{82}	—	March 15, 2004	Socorro	LINEAR	·	3.6 km	MPC · JPL
211834	2004 EN_{86}	—	March 15, 2004	Catalina	CSS	KOR	2.1 km	MPC · JPL
211835	2004 ET_{86}	—	March 15, 2004	Kitt Peak	Spacewatch	·	3.4 km	MPC · JPL
211836	2004 FG_{2}	—	March 17, 2004	Goodricke-Pigott	R. A. Tucker	·	2.2 km	MPC · JPL
211837	2004 FS_{17}	—	March 26, 2004	Socorro	LINEAR	H	920 m	MPC · JPL
211838	2004 FV_{17}	—	March 27, 2004	Socorro	LINEAR	H	760 m	MPC · JPL
211839	2004 FA_{21}	—	March 16, 2004	Catalina	CSS	·	3.6 km	MPC · JPL
211840	2004 FJ_{28}	—	March 18, 2004	Socorro	LINEAR	·	2.7 km	MPC · JPL
211841	2004 FO_{52}	—	March 19, 2004	Socorro	LINEAR	·	5.1 km	MPC · JPL
211842	2004 FY_{61}	—	March 19, 2004	Socorro	LINEAR	·	2.8 km	MPC · JPL
211843	2004 FT_{75}	—	March 17, 2004	Kitt Peak	Spacewatch	KOR	1.8 km	MPC · JPL
211844	2004 FB_{77}	—	March 18, 2004	Socorro	LINEAR	·	2.6 km	MPC · JPL
211845	2004 FH_{82}	—	March 17, 2004	Kitt Peak	Spacewatch	DOR	3.7 km	MPC · JPL
211846	2004 FQ_{92}	—	March 18, 2004	Socorro	LINEAR	·	4.3 km	MPC · JPL
211847	2004 FK_{104}	—	March 23, 2004	Kitt Peak	Spacewatch	AGN	1.7 km	MPC · JPL
211848	2004 FW_{107}	—	March 22, 2004	Socorro	LINEAR	·	4.0 km	MPC · JPL
211849	2004 FS_{121}	—	March 24, 2004	Anderson Mesa	LONEOS	·	2.7 km	MPC · JPL
211850	2004 FQ_{133}	—	March 23, 2004	Cordell-Lorenz	Cordell-Lorenz	·	2.9 km	MPC · JPL
211851	2004 FT_{139}	—	March 26, 2004	Anderson Mesa	LONEOS	·	4.8 km	MPC · JPL
211852	2004 FS_{141}	—	March 27, 2004	Socorro	LINEAR	·	2.7 km	MPC · JPL
211853	2004 FV_{143}	—	March 28, 2004	Socorro	LINEAR	·	5.1 km	MPC · JPL
211854	2004 FX_{143}	—	March 28, 2004	Socorro	LINEAR	·	5.3 km	MPC · JPL
211855	2004 FZ_{143}	—	March 28, 2004	Socorro	LINEAR	EOS	3.1 km	MPC · JPL
211856	2004 FF_{145}	—	March 29, 2004	Socorro	LINEAR	EUP	5.9 km	MPC · JPL
211857	2004 FH_{147}	—	March 23, 2004	Socorro	LINEAR	H	780 m	MPC · JPL
211858	2004 GN_{14}	—	April 13, 2004	Kitt Peak	Spacewatch	·	4.0 km	MPC · JPL
211859	2004 GP_{19}	—	April 15, 2004	Palomar	NEAT	H	950 m	MPC · JPL
211860	2004 GH_{20}	—	April 15, 2004	Siding Spring	SSS	H	800 m	MPC · JPL
211861	2004 GK_{25}	—	April 14, 2004	Kitt Peak	Spacewatch	·	2.8 km	MPC · JPL
211862	2004 GN_{27}	—	April 15, 2004	Palomar	NEAT	EOS	3.1 km	MPC · JPL
211863	2004 GS_{31}	—	April 15, 2004	Anderson Mesa	LONEOS	·	4.4 km	MPC · JPL
211864	2004 GF_{35}	—	April 13, 2004	Kitt Peak	Spacewatch	·	2.6 km	MPC · JPL
211865	2004 GF_{37}	—	April 14, 2004	Anderson Mesa	LONEOS	·	5.4 km	MPC · JPL
211866	2004 GO_{41}	—	April 13, 2004	Palomar	NEAT	·	4.9 km	MPC · JPL
211867	2004 GC_{42}	—	April 14, 2004	Kitt Peak	Spacewatch	·	5.0 km	MPC · JPL
211868	2004 GB_{67}	—	April 13, 2004	Kitt Peak	Spacewatch	·	3.0 km	MPC · JPL
211869	2004 GR_{69}	—	April 13, 2004	Kitt Peak	Spacewatch	·	6.1 km	MPC · JPL
211870	2004 GZ_{79}	—	April 12, 2004	Palomar	NEAT	·	3.3 km	MPC · JPL
211871	2004 HO	—	April 17, 2004	Socorro	LINEAR	APO	410 m	MPC · JPL
211872	2004 HY_{16}	—	April 16, 2004	Kitt Peak	Spacewatch	EOS	2.4 km	MPC · JPL
211873	2004 HQ_{24}	—	April 19, 2004	Kitt Peak	Spacewatch	·	3.4 km	MPC · JPL
211874	2004 HT_{31}	—	April 19, 2004	Socorro	LINEAR	·	3.8 km	MPC · JPL
211875	2004 HY_{36}	—	April 20, 2004	Kitt Peak	Spacewatch	·	5.7 km	MPC · JPL
211876	2004 HM_{37}	—	April 21, 2004	Catalina	CSS	·	2.9 km	MPC · JPL
211877	2004 HN_{38}	—	April 23, 2004	Kitt Peak	Spacewatch	·	5.9 km	MPC · JPL
211878	2004 HO_{55}	—	April 24, 2004	Socorro	LINEAR	·	4.6 km	MPC · JPL
211879	2004 HZ_{55}	—	April 24, 2004	Haleakala	NEAT	·	5.4 km	MPC · JPL
211880	2004 HO_{56}	—	April 25, 2004	Anderson Mesa	LONEOS	H	630 m	MPC · JPL
211881	2004 HC_{59}	—	April 24, 2004	Kitt Peak	Spacewatch	·	3.4 km	MPC · JPL
211882	2004 HW_{67}	—	April 20, 2004	Kitt Peak	Spacewatch	EOS	2.4 km	MPC · JPL
211883	2004 HE_{78}	—	April 16, 2004	Apache Point	SDSS	H	1.0 km	MPC · JPL
211884	2004 JF_{5}	—	May 12, 2004	Desert Eagle	W. K. Y. Yeung	·	2.4 km	MPC · JPL
211885	2004 JA_{7}	—	May 13, 2004	Socorro	LINEAR	·	4.5 km	MPC · JPL
211886	2004 JD_{7}	—	May 13, 2004	Socorro	LINEAR	EUP	4.2 km	MPC · JPL
211887	2004 JQ_{13}	—	May 9, 2004	Kitt Peak	Spacewatch	·	3.6 km	MPC · JPL
211888	2004 JE_{15}	—	May 10, 2004	Kitt Peak	Spacewatch	·	4.0 km	MPC · JPL
211889	2004 JS_{16}	—	May 11, 2004	Anderson Mesa	LONEOS	HYG	3.9 km	MPC · JPL
211890	2004 JP_{18}	—	May 13, 2004	Anderson Mesa	LONEOS	·	2.2 km	MPC · JPL
211891	2004 JW_{19}	—	May 13, 2004	Palomar	NEAT	·	5.4 km	MPC · JPL
211892	2004 JE_{25}	—	May 15, 2004	Socorro	LINEAR	ADE	3.3 km	MPC · JPL
211893	2004 JW_{27}	—	May 15, 2004	Siding Spring	SSS	·	5.4 km	MPC · JPL
211894	2004 JL_{29}	—	May 15, 2004	Socorro	LINEAR	·	2.7 km	MPC · JPL
211895	2004 JX_{32}	—	May 15, 2004	Socorro	LINEAR	LIX	5.5 km	MPC · JPL
211896	2004 JY_{34}	—	May 15, 2004	Socorro	LINEAR	·	3.6 km	MPC · JPL
211897	2004 JP_{39}	—	May 14, 2004	Kitt Peak	Spacewatch	·	4.0 km	MPC · JPL
211898	2004 JV_{40}	—	May 14, 2004	Kitt Peak	Spacewatch	·	4.0 km	MPC · JPL
211899	2004 JV_{41}	—	May 15, 2004	Socorro	LINEAR	·	6.4 km	MPC · JPL
211900	2004 JP_{53}	—	May 9, 2004	Kitt Peak	Spacewatch	·	2.7 km	MPC · JPL

== 211901–212000 ==
back to top

Designation			Discovery			Properties		Ref
Permanent	Provisional	Named after	Date	Site	Discoverer(s)	Category	Diam.	Ref
211901	2004 JE_{55}	—	May 10, 2004	Kitt Peak	Spacewatch	·	2.8 km	MPC · JPL
211902	2004 KO_{14}	—	May 23, 2004	Kitt Peak	Spacewatch	·	4.1 km	MPC · JPL
211903	2004 LT_{6}	—	June 11, 2004	Socorro	LINEAR	LIX	7.0 km	MPC · JPL
211904	2004 LJ_{14}	—	June 11, 2004	Kitt Peak	Spacewatch	·	5.2 km	MPC · JPL
211905	2004 LK_{20}	—	June 12, 2004	Socorro	LINEAR	·	5.1 km	MPC · JPL
211906	2004 LR_{28}	—	June 14, 2004	Kitt Peak	Spacewatch	·	3.2 km	MPC · JPL
211907	2004 NL_{4}	—	July 14, 2004	Socorro	LINEAR	H	880 m	MPC · JPL
211908	2004 NK_{33}	—	July 12, 2004	Siding Spring	SSS	·	5.3 km	MPC · JPL
211909	2004 PN_{9}	—	August 6, 2004	Campo Imperatore	CINEOS	TIR ·	5.4 km	MPC · JPL
211910	2004 PG_{105}	—	August 6, 2004	Campo Imperatore	CINEOS	H	740 m	MPC · JPL
211911	2004 QX_{6}	—	August 21, 2004	Reedy Creek	J. Broughton	·	3.3 km	MPC · JPL
211912	2004 QP_{17}	—	August 25, 2004	Socorro	LINEAR	·	2.1 km	MPC · JPL
211913	2004 RZ_{207}	—	September 11, 2004	Socorro	LINEAR	H	740 m	MPC · JPL
211914	2004 RM_{251}	—	September 14, 2004	Socorro	LINEAR	AMO +1km	1 km	MPC · JPL
211915	2004 SJ_{9}	—	September 18, 2004	Socorro	LINEAR	·	3.1 km	MPC · JPL
211916	2004 SN_{61}	—	September 23, 2004	Socorro	LINEAR	·	1.1 km	MPC · JPL
211917	2004 TG_{8}	—	October 4, 2004	Wrightwood	J. W. Young	·	920 m	MPC · JPL
211918	2004 TY_{20}	—	October 11, 2004	Kitt Peak	Spacewatch	·	940 m	MPC · JPL
211919	2004 TW_{36}	—	October 4, 2004	Kitt Peak	Spacewatch	·	740 m	MPC · JPL
211920	2004 TL_{73}	—	October 6, 2004	Kitt Peak	Spacewatch	·	990 m	MPC · JPL
211921	2004 TQ_{86}	—	October 5, 2004	Kitt Peak	Spacewatch	·	770 m	MPC · JPL
211922	2004 TE_{103}	—	October 6, 2004	Palomar	NEAT	·	860 m	MPC · JPL
211923	2004 TE_{173}	—	October 8, 2004	Socorro	LINEAR	·	2.0 km	MPC · JPL
211924	2004 TW_{275}	—	October 9, 2004	Kitt Peak	Spacewatch	·	1.1 km	MPC · JPL
211925	2004 TD_{323}	—	October 11, 2004	Kitt Peak	Spacewatch	·	890 m	MPC · JPL
211926	2004 UF_{11}	—	October 21, 2004	Socorro	LINEAR	·	980 m	MPC · JPL
211927	2004 VE_{6}	—	November 3, 2004	Kitt Peak	Spacewatch	·	1.2 km	MPC · JPL
211928	2004 VX_{11}	—	November 3, 2004	Catalina	CSS	·	1.1 km	MPC · JPL
211929	2004 VB_{13}	—	November 3, 2004	Palomar	NEAT	·	1.1 km	MPC · JPL
211930	2004 VM_{20}	—	November 4, 2004	Catalina	CSS	·	860 m	MPC · JPL
211931	2004 VP_{25}	—	November 4, 2004	Kitt Peak	Spacewatch	·	1.1 km	MPC · JPL
211932	2004 VR_{80}	—	November 3, 2004	Catalina	CSS	·	1.3 km	MPC · JPL
211933	2004 XN_{4}	—	December 2, 2004	Socorro	LINEAR	·	1.2 km	MPC · JPL
211934	2004 XT_{6}	—	December 2, 2004	Socorro	LINEAR	·	1.3 km	MPC · JPL
211935	2004 XB_{8}	—	December 2, 2004	Palomar	NEAT	·	1.0 km	MPC · JPL
211936	2004 XY_{18}	—	December 8, 2004	Socorro	LINEAR	·	940 m	MPC · JPL
211937	2004 XP_{20}	—	December 8, 2004	Socorro	LINEAR	·	1.2 km	MPC · JPL
211938	2004 XR_{25}	—	December 9, 2004	Catalina	CSS	·	1.7 km	MPC · JPL
211939	2004 XV_{36}	—	December 11, 2004	Campo Imperatore	CINEOS	·	1.4 km	MPC · JPL
211940	2004 XU_{50}	—	December 14, 2004	Campo Imperatore	CINEOS	·	1.5 km	MPC · JPL
211941	2004 XQ_{60}	—	December 12, 2004	Kitt Peak	Spacewatch	MAS	770 m	MPC · JPL
211942	2004 XM_{64}	—	December 2, 2004	Kitt Peak	Spacewatch	NYS	1.1 km	MPC · JPL
211943	2004 XP_{78}	—	December 10, 2004	Socorro	LINEAR	·	970 m	MPC · JPL
211944	2004 XD_{79}	—	December 10, 2004	Socorro	LINEAR	NYS	1.3 km	MPC · JPL
211945	2004 XT_{82}	—	December 11, 2004	Kitt Peak	Spacewatch	·	880 m	MPC · JPL
211946	2004 XF_{92}	—	December 11, 2004	Socorro	LINEAR	(2076)	1.0 km	MPC · JPL
211947	2004 XL_{101}	—	December 14, 2004	Socorro	LINEAR	NYS	1.2 km	MPC · JPL
211948	2004 XL_{110}	—	December 14, 2004	Socorro	LINEAR	V	1.0 km	MPC · JPL
211949	2004 XE_{119}	—	December 12, 2004	Kitt Peak	Spacewatch	·	850 m	MPC · JPL
211950	2004 XM_{121}	—	December 14, 2004	Catalina	CSS	·	2.2 km	MPC · JPL
211951	2004 XC_{127}	—	December 14, 2004	Socorro	LINEAR	·	1.2 km	MPC · JPL
211952	2004 XA_{145}	—	December 13, 2004	Socorro	LINEAR	·	2.2 km	MPC · JPL
211953	2004 XL_{149}	—	December 15, 2004	Kitt Peak	Spacewatch	MAS	980 m	MPC · JPL
211954	2004 XB_{161}	—	December 14, 2004	Kitt Peak	Spacewatch	·	1.3 km	MPC · JPL
211955	2004 XG_{162}	—	December 15, 2004	Socorro	LINEAR	·	1.7 km	MPC · JPL
211956	2004 XZ_{165}	—	December 2, 2004	Kitt Peak	Spacewatch	·	980 m	MPC · JPL
211957	2004 YA_{4}	—	December 16, 2004	Kitt Peak	Spacewatch	NYS	1.4 km	MPC · JPL
211958	2004 YT_{7}	—	December 18, 2004	Mount Lemmon	Mount Lemmon Survey	·	1.1 km	MPC · JPL
211959	2004 YT_{17}	—	December 18, 2004	Mount Lemmon	Mount Lemmon Survey	·	2.3 km	MPC · JPL
211960	2004 YC_{27}	—	December 20, 2004	Mount Lemmon	Mount Lemmon Survey	·	1.3 km	MPC · JPL
211961	2004 YG_{36}	—	December 18, 2004	Socorro	LINEAR	·	2.1 km	MPC · JPL
211962	2005 AD_{7}	—	January 6, 2005	Catalina	CSS	·	2.4 km	MPC · JPL
211963	2005 AB_{8}	—	January 6, 2005	Catalina	CSS	·	2.2 km	MPC · JPL
211964	2005 AJ_{8}	—	January 6, 2005	Catalina	CSS	NYS	1.7 km	MPC · JPL
211965	2005 AN_{12}	—	January 6, 2005	Catalina	CSS	·	880 m	MPC · JPL
211966	2005 AS_{12}	—	January 6, 2005	Socorro	LINEAR	·	1.4 km	MPC · JPL
211967	2005 AQ_{15}	—	January 6, 2005	Socorro	LINEAR	·	1.2 km	MPC · JPL
211968	2005 AZ_{15}	—	January 6, 2005	Socorro	LINEAR	·	1.4 km	MPC · JPL
211969	2005 AK_{17}	—	January 6, 2005	Socorro	LINEAR	·	1.4 km	MPC · JPL
211970	2005 AQ_{17}	—	January 6, 2005	Socorro	LINEAR	·	970 m	MPC · JPL
211971	2005 AT_{17}	—	January 6, 2005	Socorro	LINEAR	·	2.2 km	MPC · JPL
211972	2005 AZ_{17}	—	January 6, 2005	Socorro	LINEAR	·	1.8 km	MPC · JPL
211973	2005 AB_{18}	—	January 6, 2005	Socorro	LINEAR	NYS	1.6 km	MPC · JPL
211974	2005 AA_{22}	—	January 6, 2005	Socorro	LINEAR	·	1.9 km	MPC · JPL
211975	2005 AO_{23}	—	January 7, 2005	Socorro	LINEAR	V	1.1 km	MPC · JPL
211976	2005 AL_{26}	—	January 12, 2005	Socorro	LINEAR	NYS	1.3 km	MPC · JPL
211977 Springob	2005 AX_{26}	Springob	January 13, 2005	Kitt Peak	Spacewatch	·	1.2 km	MPC · JPL
211978	2005 AU_{29}	—	January 8, 2005	Campo Imperatore	CINEOS	·	1.1 km	MPC · JPL
211979	2005 AM_{31}	—	January 11, 2005	Socorro	LINEAR	·	1.7 km	MPC · JPL
211980	2005 AE_{33}	—	January 12, 2005	Socorro	LINEAR	V	1.1 km	MPC · JPL
211981	2005 AA_{38}	—	January 13, 2005	Kitt Peak	Spacewatch	·	1.6 km	MPC · JPL
211982	2005 AE_{38}	—	January 13, 2005	Catalina	CSS	·	1.4 km	MPC · JPL
211983	2005 AE_{43}	—	January 15, 2005	Socorro	LINEAR	·	1.5 km	MPC · JPL
211984	2005 AZ_{43}	—	January 15, 2005	Kitt Peak	Spacewatch	·	1.7 km	MPC · JPL
211985	2005 AT_{44}	—	January 15, 2005	Kitt Peak	Spacewatch	V	850 m	MPC · JPL
211986	2005 AV_{44}	—	January 15, 2005	Kitt Peak	Spacewatch	NYS	1.7 km	MPC · JPL
211987	2005 AG_{45}	—	January 15, 2005	Kitt Peak	Spacewatch	·	1.5 km	MPC · JPL
211988	2005 AF_{58}	—	January 15, 2005	Socorro	LINEAR	MAS	880 m	MPC · JPL
211989	2005 AO_{58}	—	January 15, 2005	Socorro	LINEAR	·	1.1 km	MPC · JPL
211990	2005 AX_{58}	—	January 15, 2005	Socorro	LINEAR	·	1.6 km	MPC · JPL
211991	2005 AQ_{60}	—	January 15, 2005	Kitt Peak	Spacewatch	·	1.1 km	MPC · JPL
211992	2005 AV_{61}	—	January 15, 2005	Kitt Peak	Spacewatch	L5	10 km	MPC · JPL
211993	2005 AR_{69}	—	January 15, 2005	Kitt Peak	Spacewatch	·	1.3 km	MPC · JPL
211994	2005 AK_{70}	—	January 15, 2005	Kitt Peak	Spacewatch	MAS	740 m	MPC · JPL
211995	2005 AT_{73}	—	January 15, 2005	Kitt Peak	Spacewatch	NYS	1.5 km	MPC · JPL
211996	2005 AL_{76}	—	January 15, 2005	Kitt Peak	Spacewatch	·	1.6 km	MPC · JPL
211997	2005 AV_{76}	—	January 15, 2005	Kitt Peak	Spacewatch	·	1.3 km	MPC · JPL
211998	2005 BC_{3}	—	January 16, 2005	Kitt Peak	Spacewatch	·	1.2 km	MPC · JPL
211999	2005 BH_{6}	—	January 16, 2005	Socorro	LINEAR	NYS	1.3 km	MPC · JPL
212000	2005 BU_{8}	—	January 16, 2005	Socorro	LINEAR	·	1.4 km	MPC · JPL

back to top

== See also ==
- Meanings of minor-planet names: 211001–212000
