= List of minor planets: 214001–215000 =

The following is a partial list of minor planets, running from minor-planet number 214001 through 215000, inclusive. The primary data for this and other partial lists is based on JPL's "Small-Body Orbital Elements" and data available from the Minor Planet Center. Critical list information is also provided by the MPC, unless otherwise specified from Lowell Observatory. A detailed description of the table's columns and additional sources are given on the main page including a complete list of every page in this series, and a statistical break-up on the dynamical classification of minor planets.

Also see the summary list of all named bodies in numerical and alphabetical order, and the corresponding naming citations for the number range of this particular list. New namings may only be added to this list after official publication, as the preannouncement of names is condemned by the Working Group for Small Bodies Nomenclature of the International Astronomical Union.

Near-Earth obj.	MBA (inner)	MBA (outer)	Centaur
Mars-crosser	MBA (middle)	Jupiter trojan	Trans-Neptunian obj.
Unclassified

== 214001–214100 ==
Designation			Discovery			Properties		Ref
Permanent	Provisional	Named after	Date	Site	Discoverer(s)	Category	Diam.	Ref
214001	2004 BO_{108}	—	January 28, 2004	Catalina	CSS	·	5.5 km	MPC · JPL
214002	2004 BO_{110}	—	January 28, 2004	Catalina	CSS	GEF	2.2 km	MPC · JPL
214003	2004 BA_{114}	—	January 29, 2004	Socorro	LINEAR	·	4.8 km	MPC · JPL
214004	2004 CG	—	February 2, 2004	Catalina	CSS	HNS	2.4 km	MPC · JPL
214005	2004 CO_{2}	—	February 12, 2004	Goodricke-Pigott	R. A. Tucker	GEF	2.2 km	MPC · JPL
214006	2004 CK_{7}	—	February 10, 2004	Palomar	NEAT	·	2.6 km	MPC · JPL
214007	2004 CO_{13}	—	February 11, 2004	Palomar	NEAT	(12739)	2.4 km	MPC · JPL
214008	2004 CJ_{36}	—	February 11, 2004	Palomar	NEAT	DOR	3.7 km	MPC · JPL
214009	2004 CJ_{54}	—	February 11, 2004	Kitt Peak	Spacewatch	·	2.3 km	MPC · JPL
214010	2004 CR_{54}	—	February 11, 2004	Palomar	NEAT	DOR	3.3 km	MPC · JPL
214011	2004 CC_{63}	—	February 12, 2004	Palomar	NEAT	·	2.7 km	MPC · JPL
214012	2004 CH_{73}	—	February 14, 2004	Palomar	NEAT	DOR	5.3 km	MPC · JPL
214013	2004 CZ_{94}	—	February 12, 2004	Kitt Peak	Spacewatch	DOR	2.8 km	MPC · JPL
214014	2004 CC_{111}	—	February 14, 2004	Kitt Peak	Spacewatch	AEO	1.5 km	MPC · JPL
214015	2004 CV_{111}	—	February 10, 2004	Palomar	NEAT	·	3.2 km	MPC · JPL
214016	2004 DJ	—	February 16, 2004	Desert Eagle	W. K. Y. Yeung	·	3.6 km	MPC · JPL
214017	2004 DJ_{3}	—	February 16, 2004	Kitt Peak	Spacewatch	·	3.0 km	MPC · JPL
214018	2004 DU_{4}	—	February 16, 2004	Kitt Peak	Spacewatch	·	2.2 km	MPC · JPL
214019	2004 DC_{8}	—	February 17, 2004	Kitt Peak	Spacewatch	·	2.3 km	MPC · JPL
214020	2004 DG_{12}	—	February 17, 2004	Haleakala	NEAT	·	2.9 km	MPC · JPL
214021	2004 DA_{13}	—	February 16, 2004	Catalina	CSS	(18466)	4.1 km	MPC · JPL
214022	2004 DB_{23}	—	February 18, 2004	Catalina	CSS	·	2.9 km	MPC · JPL
214023	2004 DA_{24}	—	February 19, 2004	Socorro	LINEAR	·	2.2 km	MPC · JPL
214024	2004 DZ_{26}	—	February 16, 2004	Kitt Peak	Spacewatch	·	2.5 km	MPC · JPL
214025	2004 DD_{35}	—	February 19, 2004	Socorro	LINEAR	·	2.6 km	MPC · JPL
214026	2004 DX_{38}	—	February 22, 2004	Kitt Peak	Spacewatch	·	2.4 km	MPC · JPL
214027	2004 DF_{42}	—	February 19, 2004	Socorro	LINEAR	·	3.3 km	MPC · JPL
214028	2004 DR_{49}	—	February 20, 2004	Haleakala	NEAT	·	2.8 km	MPC · JPL
214029	2004 DU_{61}	—	February 26, 2004	Socorro	LINEAR	AGN	2.0 km	MPC · JPL
214030	2004 ES_{1}	—	March 11, 2004	Palomar	NEAT	DOR	3.0 km	MPC · JPL
214031	2004 EV_{1}	—	March 11, 2004	Palomar	NEAT	EUN	1.5 km	MPC · JPL
214032	2004 EE_{4}	—	March 11, 2004	Palomar	NEAT	·	3.2 km	MPC · JPL
214033	2004 EB_{6}	—	March 11, 2004	Palomar	NEAT	·	4.8 km	MPC · JPL
214034	2004 EE_{12}	—	March 11, 2004	Palomar	NEAT	·	2.5 km	MPC · JPL
214035	2004 EW_{14}	—	March 11, 2004	Palomar	NEAT	·	4.8 km	MPC · JPL
214036	2004 EZ_{14}	—	March 11, 2004	Palomar	NEAT	EOS	4.7 km	MPC · JPL
214037	2004 EZ_{41}	—	March 15, 2004	Socorro	LINEAR	·	3.0 km	MPC · JPL
214038	2004 EN_{49}	—	March 15, 2004	Catalina	CSS	·	2.9 km	MPC · JPL
214039	2004 EY_{54}	—	March 14, 2004	Palomar	NEAT	·	4.0 km	MPC · JPL
214040	2004 EC_{58}	—	March 15, 2004	Socorro	LINEAR	GEF	1.8 km	MPC · JPL
214041	2004 EY_{60}	—	March 12, 2004	Palomar	NEAT	·	2.6 km	MPC · JPL
214042	2004 EX_{62}	—	March 13, 2004	Palomar	NEAT	·	2.1 km	MPC · JPL
214043	2004 EH_{63}	—	March 13, 2004	Palomar	NEAT	·	3.2 km	MPC · JPL
214044	2004 EU_{65}	—	March 14, 2004	Socorro	LINEAR	·	3.3 km	MPC · JPL
214045	2004 EV_{66}	—	March 14, 2004	Catalina	CSS	EMA	6.5 km	MPC · JPL
214046	2004 EZ_{68}	—	March 15, 2004	Socorro	LINEAR	·	2.7 km	MPC · JPL
214047	2004 EP_{74}	—	March 13, 2004	Palomar	NEAT	·	3.1 km	MPC · JPL
214048	2004 EH_{84}	—	March 15, 2004	Kitt Peak	Spacewatch	HOF	3.2 km	MPC · JPL
214049	2004 EK_{115}	—	March 14, 2004	Socorro	LINEAR	·	3.1 km	MPC · JPL
214050	2004 FU	—	March 16, 2004	Valmeca	Valmeca	·	2.7 km	MPC · JPL
214051	2004 FB_{19}	—	March 16, 2004	Kitt Peak	Spacewatch	·	2.8 km	MPC · JPL
214052	2004 FX_{26}	—	March 17, 2004	Kitt Peak	Spacewatch	·	3.7 km	MPC · JPL
214053	2004 FR_{33}	—	March 16, 2004	Socorro	LINEAR	·	2.6 km	MPC · JPL
214054	2004 FY_{37}	—	March 17, 2004	Kitt Peak	Spacewatch	·	2.2 km	MPC · JPL
214055	2004 FS_{50}	—	March 18, 2004	Kitt Peak	Spacewatch	·	2.3 km	MPC · JPL
214056	2004 FR_{51}	—	March 19, 2004	Palomar	NEAT	·	3.6 km	MPC · JPL
214057	2004 FH_{52}	—	March 19, 2004	Socorro	LINEAR	·	3.7 km	MPC · JPL
214058	2004 FD_{69}	—	March 16, 2004	Kitt Peak	Spacewatch	EUN	1.4 km	MPC · JPL
214059	2004 FO_{84}	—	March 18, 2004	Catalina	CSS	·	2.5 km	MPC · JPL
214060	2004 FC_{88}	—	March 20, 2004	Kitt Peak	Spacewatch	DOR	3.9 km	MPC · JPL
214061	2004 FY_{94}	—	March 19, 2004	Palomar	NEAT	·	2.9 km	MPC · JPL
214062	2004 FY_{96}	—	March 23, 2004	Socorro	LINEAR	·	2.5 km	MPC · JPL
214063	2004 FK_{97}	—	March 23, 2004	Socorro	LINEAR	·	3.7 km	MPC · JPL
214064	2004 FR_{99}	—	March 22, 2004	Socorro	LINEAR	·	2.8 km	MPC · JPL
214065	2004 FR_{108}	—	March 23, 2004	Kitt Peak	Spacewatch	(32418)	2.8 km	MPC · JPL
214066	2004 FU_{109}	—	March 24, 2004	Anderson Mesa	LONEOS	·	2.7 km	MPC · JPL
214067	2004 FK_{111}	—	March 26, 2004	Socorro	LINEAR	·	2.9 km	MPC · JPL
214068	2004 GX_{1}	—	April 11, 2004	Catalina	CSS	LIX	5.1 km	MPC · JPL
214069	2004 GX_{6}	—	April 12, 2004	Kitt Peak	Spacewatch	·	2.0 km	MPC · JPL
214070	2004 GF_{9}	—	April 12, 2004	Anderson Mesa	LONEOS	TIR	4.7 km	MPC · JPL
214071	2004 GQ_{29}	—	April 12, 2004	Palomar	NEAT	EOS	3.2 km	MPC · JPL
214072	2004 GW_{31}	—	April 9, 2004	Siding Spring	SSS	·	4.5 km	MPC · JPL
214073	2004 GX_{45}	—	April 12, 2004	Kitt Peak	Spacewatch	·	2.3 km	MPC · JPL
214074	2004 GT_{56}	—	April 13, 2004	Kitt Peak	Spacewatch	EOS	2.1 km	MPC · JPL
214075	2004 GP_{72}	—	April 14, 2004	Kitt Peak	Spacewatch	·	3.6 km	MPC · JPL
214076	2004 GD_{84}	—	April 14, 2004	Kitt Peak	Spacewatch	·	1.9 km	MPC · JPL
214077	2004 GQ_{88}	—	April 12, 2004	Kitt Peak	Spacewatch	·	5.2 km	MPC · JPL
214078	2004 HH_{12}	—	April 19, 2004	Goodricke-Pigott	Goodricke-Pigott	·	3.8 km	MPC · JPL
214079	2004 HW_{25}	—	April 19, 2004	Socorro	LINEAR	·	3.7 km	MPC · JPL
214080	2004 HH_{31}	—	April 16, 2004	Anderson Mesa	LONEOS	LIX	4.5 km	MPC · JPL
214081 Balavoine	2004 HL_{31}	Balavoine	April 17, 2004	Nogales	M. Ory	·	2.7 km	MPC · JPL
214082	2004 HB_{41}	—	April 19, 2004	Socorro	LINEAR	·	6.3 km	MPC · JPL
214083	2004 HH_{57}	—	April 21, 2004	Kitt Peak	Spacewatch	KOR	1.6 km	MPC · JPL
214084	2004 HJ_{62}	—	April 30, 2004	Reedy Creek	J. Broughton	·	1.5 km	MPC · JPL
214085	2004 HX_{74}	—	April 30, 2004	Kitt Peak	Spacewatch	·	5.0 km	MPC · JPL
214086	2004 JW_{2}	—	May 9, 2004	Kitt Peak	Spacewatch	·	3.9 km	MPC · JPL
214087	2004 JC_{6}	—	May 12, 2004	Socorro	LINEAR	EUP	5.5 km	MPC · JPL
214088	2004 JN_{13}	—	May 15, 2004	Socorro	LINEAR	T_{j} (2.85) · APO +1km	2.4 km	MPC · JPL
214089	2004 JK_{20}	—	May 14, 2004	Palomar	NEAT	·	3.1 km	MPC · JPL
214090	2004 JW_{21}	—	May 9, 2004	Kitt Peak	Spacewatch	THM	3.3 km	MPC · JPL
214091	2004 JG_{31}	—	May 15, 2004	Socorro	LINEAR	·	4.9 km	MPC · JPL
214092	2004 JY_{31}	—	May 14, 2004	Socorro	LINEAR	H · slow	760 m	MPC · JPL
214093	2004 JQ_{43}	—	May 10, 2004	Kitt Peak	Spacewatch	L4	20 km	MPC · JPL
214094	2004 KY_{6}	—	May 19, 2004	Kitt Peak	Spacewatch	EOS	2.4 km	MPC · JPL
214095	2004 LT_{4}	—	June 11, 2004	Palomar	NEAT	·	2.7 km	MPC · JPL
214096	2004 LQ_{11}	—	June 12, 2004	Siding Spring	SSS	·	4.6 km	MPC · JPL
214097	2004 NO_{9}	—	July 9, 2004	Socorro	LINEAR	·	5.6 km	MPC · JPL
214098	2004 NV_{15}	—	July 11, 2004	Socorro	LINEAR	THB	5.3 km	MPC · JPL
214099	2004 NN_{17}	—	July 11, 2004	Socorro	LINEAR	CYB	5.9 km	MPC · JPL
214100	2004 OY_{5}	—	July 18, 2004	Reedy Creek	J. Broughton	·	3.9 km	MPC · JPL

== 214101–214200 ==
back to top

Designation			Discovery			Properties		Ref
Permanent	Provisional	Named after	Date	Site	Discoverer(s)	Category	Diam.	Ref
214101	2004 OQ_{12}	—	July 16, 2004	Socorro	LINEAR	THM	3.8 km	MPC · JPL
214102	2004 PD_{58}	—	August 9, 2004	Socorro	LINEAR	HYG	4.9 km	MPC · JPL
214103	2004 PP_{65}	—	August 10, 2004	Anderson Mesa	LONEOS	·	1.6 km	MPC · JPL
214104	2004 PR_{75}	—	August 8, 2004	Campo Imperatore	CINEOS	·	4.0 km	MPC · JPL
214105	2004 QK_{9}	—	August 20, 2004	Siding Spring	SSS	H	800 m	MPC · JPL
214106	2004 QN_{18}	—	August 20, 2004	Siding Spring	SSS	·	3.2 km	MPC · JPL
214107	2004 RV_{29}	—	September 7, 2004	Socorro	LINEAR	·	1.4 km	MPC · JPL
214108	2004 RX_{93}	—	September 8, 2004	Socorro	LINEAR	·	1.5 km	MPC · JPL
214109	2004 RF_{154}	—	September 10, 2004	Socorro	LINEAR	·	1.0 km	MPC · JPL
214110	2004 RL_{181}	—	September 10, 2004	Socorro	LINEAR	·	4.8 km	MPC · JPL
214111	2004 RS_{194}	—	September 10, 2004	Socorro	LINEAR	·	1.4 km	MPC · JPL
214112	2004 RM_{306}	—	September 12, 2004	Socorro	LINEAR	·	6.8 km	MPC · JPL
214113	2004 RP_{339}	—	September 7, 2004	Socorro	LINEAR	CYB	4.9 km	MPC · JPL
214114	2004 SY_{22}	—	September 17, 2004	Kitt Peak	Spacewatch	·	940 m	MPC · JPL
214115	2004 TO_{45}	—	October 4, 2004	Kitt Peak	Spacewatch	MAS	1.1 km	MPC · JPL
214116	2004 TU_{59}	—	October 5, 2004	Kitt Peak	Spacewatch	·	4.1 km	MPC · JPL
214117	2004 TW_{146}	—	October 6, 2004	Kitt Peak	Spacewatch	·	980 m	MPC · JPL
214118	2004 VM_{18}	—	November 4, 2004	Kitt Peak	Spacewatch	MIS	3.0 km	MPC · JPL
214119	2004 VH_{64}	—	November 10, 2004	Socorro	LINEAR	BAR	2.3 km	MPC · JPL
214120	2004 VZ_{73}	—	November 12, 2004	Catalina	CSS	·	760 m	MPC · JPL
214121	2004 XA_{28}	—	December 10, 2004	Socorro	LINEAR	·	1.0 km	MPC · JPL
214122	2004 XJ_{49}	—	December 11, 2004	Kitt Peak	Spacewatch	·	780 m	MPC · JPL
214123	2004 XQ_{59}	—	December 11, 2004	Socorro	LINEAR	·	1.2 km	MPC · JPL
214124	2004 XG_{85}	—	December 12, 2004	Kitt Peak	Spacewatch	·	1.4 km	MPC · JPL
214125	2004 XA_{86}	—	December 13, 2004	Kitt Peak	Spacewatch	·	1.1 km	MPC · JPL
214126	2004 XW_{90}	—	December 11, 2004	Kitt Peak	Spacewatch	·	1.6 km	MPC · JPL
214127	2004 XE_{96}	—	December 11, 2004	Kitt Peak	Spacewatch	·	740 m	MPC · JPL
214128	2004 XU_{108}	—	December 11, 2004	Kitt Peak	Spacewatch	·	1.1 km	MPC · JPL
214129	2004 XV_{162}	—	December 15, 2004	Socorro	LINEAR	·	1.3 km	MPC · JPL
214130	2004 YX_{9}	—	December 18, 2004	Mount Lemmon	Mount Lemmon Survey	·	1.2 km	MPC · JPL
214131	2005 AN	—	January 5, 2005	Pla D'Arguines	D'Arguines, Pla	·	1.0 km	MPC · JPL
214132	2005 AC_{4}	—	January 6, 2005	Catalina	CSS	·	1.1 km	MPC · JPL
214133	2005 AV_{8}	—	January 6, 2005	Socorro	LINEAR	·	950 m	MPC · JPL
214134	2005 AP_{9}	—	January 7, 2005	Catalina	CSS	(2076)	1.0 km	MPC · JPL
214135	2005 AC_{18}	—	January 6, 2005	Socorro	LINEAR	PHO	2.0 km	MPC · JPL
214136 Alinghi	2005 AQ_{27}	Alinghi	January 13, 2005	Vicques	M. Ory	·	920 m	MPC · JPL
214137	2005 AO_{28}	—	January 6, 2005	Catalina	CSS	·	1.3 km	MPC · JPL
214138	2005 AH_{35}	—	January 13, 2005	Socorro	LINEAR	·	1.3 km	MPC · JPL
214139	2005 AW_{46}	—	January 11, 2005	Socorro	LINEAR	·	1.5 km	MPC · JPL
214140	2005 AX_{47}	—	January 13, 2005	Kitt Peak	Spacewatch	·	1.7 km	MPC · JPL
214141	2005 AN_{53}	—	January 13, 2005	Socorro	LINEAR	·	1.3 km	MPC · JPL
214142	2005 AQ_{57}	—	January 15, 2005	Catalina	CSS	EUN	2.0 km	MPC · JPL
214143	2005 AP_{60}	—	January 15, 2005	Kitt Peak	Spacewatch	NYS	1.3 km	MPC · JPL
214144	2005 AR_{65}	—	January 13, 2005	Kitt Peak	Spacewatch	·	810 m	MPC · JPL
214145	2005 AC_{69}	—	January 15, 2005	Catalina	CSS	·	1.1 km	MPC · JPL
214146	2005 AE_{70}	—	January 15, 2005	Kitt Peak	Spacewatch	·	1.0 km	MPC · JPL
214147	2005 AO_{80}	—	January 15, 2005	Kitt Peak	Spacewatch	·	1.5 km	MPC · JPL
214148	2005 BS_{4}	—	January 16, 2005	Socorro	LINEAR	·	1.3 km	MPC · JPL
214149	2005 BW_{8}	—	January 16, 2005	Socorro	LINEAR	·	1.4 km	MPC · JPL
214150	2005 BJ_{11}	—	January 16, 2005	Kitt Peak	Spacewatch	·	1.0 km	MPC · JPL
214151	2005 BM_{11}	—	January 16, 2005	Kitt Peak	Spacewatch	ERI	3.0 km	MPC · JPL
214152	2005 BU_{22}	—	January 16, 2005	Kitt Peak	Spacewatch	NYS	1.6 km	MPC · JPL
214153	2005 BU_{28}	—	January 31, 2005	Palomar	NEAT	·	1.2 km	MPC · JPL
214154	2005 CJ_{5}	—	February 1, 2005	Kitt Peak	Spacewatch	MAS	940 m	MPC · JPL
214155	2005 CF_{11}	—	February 1, 2005	Kitt Peak	Spacewatch	·	1.1 km	MPC · JPL
214156	2005 CJ_{11}	—	February 1, 2005	Kitt Peak	Spacewatch	·	1.4 km	MPC · JPL
214157	2005 CC_{13}	—	February 2, 2005	Kitt Peak	Spacewatch	MAS	820 m	MPC · JPL
214158	2005 CJ_{16}	—	February 2, 2005	Socorro	LINEAR	NYS	1.4 km	MPC · JPL
214159	2005 CA_{19}	—	February 2, 2005	Catalina	CSS	ERI	3.3 km	MPC · JPL
214160	2005 CL_{19}	—	February 2, 2005	Catalina	CSS	·	1.4 km	MPC · JPL
214161	2005 CQ_{20}	—	February 2, 2005	Catalina	CSS	·	1.7 km	MPC · JPL
214162	2005 CU_{20}	—	February 2, 2005	Catalina	CSS	·	1.3 km	MPC · JPL
214163	2005 CL_{22}	—	February 1, 2005	Catalina	CSS	·	1.8 km	MPC · JPL
214164	2005 CB_{23}	—	February 1, 2005	Catalina	CSS	·	1.6 km	MPC · JPL
214165	2005 CQ_{23}	—	February 2, 2005	Catalina	CSS	V	940 m	MPC · JPL
214166	2005 CM_{31}	—	February 1, 2005	Kitt Peak	Spacewatch	ANF	2.0 km	MPC · JPL
214167	2005 CU_{36}	—	February 3, 2005	Socorro	LINEAR	·	1.7 km	MPC · JPL
214168	2005 CO_{37}	—	February 2, 2005	Catalina	CSS	NYS	1.4 km	MPC · JPL
214169	2005 CQ_{49}	—	February 2, 2005	Catalina	CSS	NYS	1.9 km	MPC · JPL
214170	2005 CS_{50}	—	February 2, 2005	Socorro	LINEAR	MAS	1.0 km	MPC · JPL
214171	2005 CE_{52}	—	February 2, 2005	Kitt Peak	Spacewatch	·	1.3 km	MPC · JPL
214172	2005 CM_{53}	—	February 3, 2005	Socorro	LINEAR	NYS	1.4 km	MPC · JPL
214173	2005 CW_{53}	—	February 4, 2005	Socorro	LINEAR	MAS	1.1 km	MPC · JPL
214174	2005 CG_{63}	—	February 9, 2005	Mount Lemmon	Mount Lemmon Survey	·	1.1 km	MPC · JPL
214175	2005 CJ_{63}	—	February 9, 2005	Anderson Mesa	LONEOS	·	1.6 km	MPC · JPL
214176	2005 CA_{67}	—	February 9, 2005	Socorro	LINEAR	NYS ·	2.5 km	MPC · JPL
214177	2005 CK_{68}	—	February 2, 2005	Kitt Peak	Spacewatch	MAS	990 m	MPC · JPL
214178	2005 CZ_{68}	—	February 4, 2005	Anderson Mesa	LONEOS	MAS	900 m	MPC · JPL
214179	2005 CQ_{69}	—	February 14, 2005	Socorro	LINEAR	MAS	750 m	MPC · JPL
214180 Mabaglioni	2005 CO_{77}	Mabaglioni	February 9, 2005	La Silla	A. Boattini, H. Scholl	·	4.0 km	MPC · JPL
214181	2005 CV_{78}	—	February 1, 2005	Kitt Peak	Spacewatch	MAS	840 m	MPC · JPL
214182	2005 ED_{1}	—	March 2, 2005	Great Shefford	Birtwhistle, P.	·	1.2 km	MPC · JPL
214183	2005 EC_{7}	—	March 1, 2005	Kitt Peak	Spacewatch	·	2.4 km	MPC · JPL
214184	2005 EO_{7}	—	March 1, 2005	Kitt Peak	Spacewatch	·	1.8 km	MPC · JPL
214185	2005 EE_{9}	—	March 2, 2005	Kitt Peak	Spacewatch	·	1.0 km	MPC · JPL
214186	2005 EG_{10}	—	March 2, 2005	Kitt Peak	Spacewatch	·	2.7 km	MPC · JPL
214187	2005 EJ_{10}	—	March 2, 2005	Kitt Peak	Spacewatch	·	1.3 km	MPC · JPL
214188	2005 EO_{11}	—	March 2, 2005	Catalina	CSS	·	1.5 km	MPC · JPL
214189	2005 EF_{13}	—	March 2, 2005	Catalina	CSS	·	1.6 km	MPC · JPL
214190	2005 ER_{13}	—	March 3, 2005	Kitt Peak	Spacewatch	·	1.9 km	MPC · JPL
214191	2005 EP_{14}	—	March 3, 2005	Kitt Peak	Spacewatch	·	2.1 km	MPC · JPL
214192	2005 EW_{17}	—	March 3, 2005	Kitt Peak	Spacewatch	·	1.5 km	MPC · JPL
214193	2005 EC_{22}	—	March 3, 2005	Catalina	CSS	·	1.5 km	MPC · JPL
214194	2005 EX_{28}	—	March 3, 2005	Catalina	CSS	V	920 m	MPC · JPL
214195	2005 EW_{29}	—	March 2, 2005	Calvin-Rehoboth	Calvin College	·	1.4 km	MPC · JPL
214196	2005 EP_{30}	—	March 6, 2005	La Silla	Gauderon, R., Behrend, R.	·	2.4 km	MPC · JPL
214197	2005 EM_{38}	—	March 3, 2005	Catalina	CSS	PHO	2.3 km	MPC · JPL
214198	2005 ET_{38}	—	March 8, 2005	Mayhill	Lowe, A.	MAS	1.0 km	MPC · JPL
214199	2005 EQ_{40}	—	March 1, 2005	Kitt Peak	Spacewatch	NYS ·	1.7 km	MPC · JPL
214200	2005 EO_{41}	—	March 1, 2005	Kitt Peak	Spacewatch	·	1.9 km	MPC · JPL

== 214201–214300 ==
back to top

Designation			Discovery			Properties		Ref
Permanent	Provisional	Named after	Date	Site	Discoverer(s)	Category	Diam.	Ref
214201	2005 EQ_{49}	—	March 3, 2005	Catalina	CSS	·	2.6 km	MPC · JPL
214202	2005 EU_{50}	—	March 3, 2005	Catalina	CSS	·	1.8 km	MPC · JPL
214203	2005 EM_{54}	—	March 4, 2005	Kitt Peak	Spacewatch	MAS	1 km	MPC · JPL
214204	2005 EB_{60}	—	March 4, 2005	Catalina	CSS	·	1.3 km	MPC · JPL
214205	2005 EZ_{60}	—	March 4, 2005	Catalina	CSS	·	2.1 km	MPC · JPL
214206	2005 EV_{63}	—	March 4, 2005	Mount Lemmon	Mount Lemmon Survey	·	1.3 km	MPC · JPL
214207	2005 EW_{64}	—	March 4, 2005	Socorro	LINEAR	MAS	900 m	MPC · JPL
214208	2005 EQ_{66}	—	March 4, 2005	Mount Lemmon	Mount Lemmon Survey	·	1.1 km	MPC · JPL
214209	2005 EN_{71}	—	March 2, 2005	Catalina	CSS	·	1.6 km	MPC · JPL
214210	2005 EX_{71}	—	March 2, 2005	Catalina	CSS	·	1.8 km	MPC · JPL
214211	2005 EO_{73}	—	March 3, 2005	Kitt Peak	Spacewatch	MAS	880 m	MPC · JPL
214212	2005 ED_{74}	—	March 3, 2005	Kitt Peak	Spacewatch	NYS	1.4 km	MPC · JPL
214213	2005 EQ_{78}	—	March 3, 2005	Catalina	CSS	·	1.5 km	MPC · JPL
214214	2005 EQ_{79}	—	March 3, 2005	Catalina	CSS	·	2.0 km	MPC · JPL
214215	2005 EK_{81}	—	March 4, 2005	Kitt Peak	Spacewatch	V	850 m	MPC · JPL
214216	2005 ES_{84}	—	March 4, 2005	Socorro	LINEAR	MAS	880 m	MPC · JPL
214217	2005 EJ_{85}	—	March 4, 2005	Socorro	LINEAR	NYS	1.6 km	MPC · JPL
214218	2005 EV_{85}	—	March 4, 2005	Socorro	LINEAR	V	1.2 km	MPC · JPL
214219	2005 EV_{91}	—	March 8, 2005	Mount Lemmon	Mount Lemmon Survey	·	1.6 km	MPC · JPL
214220	2005 EQ_{94}	—	March 10, 2005	Goodricke-Pigott	R. A. Tucker	MAS	1.0 km	MPC · JPL
214221	2005 ET_{100}	—	March 3, 2005	Catalina	CSS	·	2.1 km	MPC · JPL
214222	2005 EU_{109}	—	March 4, 2005	Mount Lemmon	Mount Lemmon Survey	MAS	800 m	MPC · JPL
214223	2005 EZ_{124}	—	March 8, 2005	Mount Lemmon	Mount Lemmon Survey	DOR	2.9 km	MPC · JPL
214224	2005 EZ_{133}	—	March 9, 2005	Socorro	LINEAR	·	1.4 km	MPC · JPL
214225	2005 EU_{135}	—	March 9, 2005	Anderson Mesa	LONEOS	NYS	1.4 km	MPC · JPL
214226	2005 EW_{142}	—	March 10, 2005	Catalina	CSS	V	950 m	MPC · JPL
214227	2005 EK_{147}	—	March 10, 2005	Mount Lemmon	Mount Lemmon Survey	·	1.4 km	MPC · JPL
214228	2005 EP_{148}	—	March 10, 2005	Kitt Peak	Spacewatch	NYS	1.5 km	MPC · JPL
214229	2005 EG_{151}	—	March 10, 2005	Kitt Peak	Spacewatch	NYS	1.6 km	MPC · JPL
214230	2005 EG_{152}	—	March 10, 2005	Kitt Peak	Spacewatch	·	950 m	MPC · JPL
214231	2005 EA_{154}	—	March 11, 2005	Catalina	CSS	PHO	1.8 km	MPC · JPL
214232	2005 EL_{155}	—	March 8, 2005	Mount Lemmon	Mount Lemmon Survey	·	1.3 km	MPC · JPL
214233	2005 EX_{159}	—	March 9, 2005	Mount Lemmon	Mount Lemmon Survey	MAS	1.1 km	MPC · JPL
214234	2005 EQ_{164}	—	March 11, 2005	Kitt Peak	Spacewatch	MAS	960 m	MPC · JPL
214235	2005 EL_{176}	—	March 8, 2005	Mount Lemmon	Mount Lemmon Survey	·	1.5 km	MPC · JPL
214236	2005 EQ_{176}	—	March 8, 2005	Mount Lemmon	Mount Lemmon Survey	NYS	1.5 km	MPC · JPL
214237	2005 EF_{181}	—	March 9, 2005	Socorro	LINEAR	·	1.6 km	MPC · JPL
214238	2005 ES_{182}	—	March 9, 2005	Socorro	LINEAR	NYS	1.7 km	MPC · JPL
214239	2005 ET_{182}	—	March 9, 2005	Socorro	LINEAR	MAS	1.1 km	MPC · JPL
214240	2005 ES_{183}	—	March 9, 2005	Mount Lemmon	Mount Lemmon Survey	·	1.8 km	MPC · JPL
214241	2005 EP_{186}	—	March 10, 2005	Catalina	CSS	·	1.5 km	MPC · JPL
214242	2005 ED_{187}	—	March 10, 2005	Mount Lemmon	Mount Lemmon Survey	NYS	1.6 km	MPC · JPL
214243	2005 EM_{215}	—	March 8, 2005	Socorro	LINEAR	·	2.0 km	MPC · JPL
214244	2005 EH_{229}	—	March 10, 2005	Mount Lemmon	Mount Lemmon Survey	MAS	860 m	MPC · JPL
214245	2005 EL_{235}	—	March 10, 2005	Mount Lemmon	Mount Lemmon Survey	NYS	1.3 km	MPC · JPL
214246	2005 EO_{252}	—	March 10, 2005	Mount Lemmon	Mount Lemmon Survey	·	1.8 km	MPC · JPL
214247	2005 EA_{257}	—	March 11, 2005	Mount Lemmon	Mount Lemmon Survey	·	1.3 km	MPC · JPL
214248	2005 EL_{270}	—	March 12, 2005	Kitt Peak	Spacewatch	·	2.0 km	MPC · JPL
214249	2005 EQ_{283}	—	March 11, 2005	Catalina	CSS	·	2.0 km	MPC · JPL
214250	2005 EU_{287}	—	March 8, 2005	Kitt Peak	Spacewatch	·	1.5 km	MPC · JPL
214251	2005 EH_{292}	—	March 10, 2005	Catalina	CSS	V	930 m	MPC · JPL
214252	2005 EU_{294}	—	March 11, 2005	Catalina	CSS	·	2.4 km	MPC · JPL
214253	2005 EO_{306}	—	March 8, 2005	Mount Lemmon	Mount Lemmon Survey	·	1.4 km	MPC · JPL
214254	2005 EV_{313}	—	March 10, 2005	Mount Lemmon	Mount Lemmon Survey	·	1.6 km	MPC · JPL
214255	2005 ER_{327}	—	March 11, 2005	Mount Lemmon	Mount Lemmon Survey	·	2.1 km	MPC · JPL
214256	2005 FA_{2}	—	March 16, 2005	Mayhill	Lowe, A.	PHO	3.2 km	MPC · JPL
214257	2005 GP	—	April 1, 2005	Junk Bond	Junk Bond	·	2.7 km	MPC · JPL
214258	2005 GM_{6}	—	April 1, 2005	Kitt Peak	Spacewatch	·	2.9 km	MPC · JPL
214259	2005 GO_{8}	—	April 1, 2005	Bergisch Gladbach	W. Bickel	MAS	910 m	MPC · JPL
214260	2005 GT_{8}	—	April 1, 2005	Goodricke-Pigott	Reddy, V.	·	3.8 km	MPC · JPL
214261	2005 GE_{11}	—	April 1, 2005	Anderson Mesa	LONEOS	MAR	2.1 km	MPC · JPL
214262	2005 GB_{14}	—	April 2, 2005	Kitt Peak	Spacewatch	ERI	1.9 km	MPC · JPL
214263	2005 GD_{16}	—	April 2, 2005	Mount Lemmon	Mount Lemmon Survey	V	800 m	MPC · JPL
214264	2005 GU_{24}	—	April 2, 2005	Palomar	NEAT	·	2.2 km	MPC · JPL
214265	2005 GU_{31}	—	April 4, 2005	Socorro	LINEAR	·	1.6 km	MPC · JPL
214266	2005 GA_{39}	—	April 4, 2005	Catalina	CSS	·	2.1 km	MPC · JPL
214267	2005 GS_{39}	—	April 4, 2005	Socorro	LINEAR	·	1.4 km	MPC · JPL
214268	2005 GH_{40}	—	April 4, 2005	Mount Lemmon	Mount Lemmon Survey	·	1.3 km	MPC · JPL
214269	2005 GQ_{42}	—	April 5, 2005	Anderson Mesa	LONEOS	V	1.0 km	MPC · JPL
214270	2005 GO_{45}	—	April 5, 2005	Catalina	CSS	·	1.7 km	MPC · JPL
214271	2005 GV_{51}	—	April 2, 2005	Mount Lemmon	Mount Lemmon Survey	(5)	1.7 km	MPC · JPL
214272	2005 GA_{52}	—	April 2, 2005	Mount Lemmon	Mount Lemmon Survey	EUN	1.9 km	MPC · JPL
214273	2005 GG_{53}	—	April 2, 2005	Mount Lemmon	Mount Lemmon Survey	·	2.2 km	MPC · JPL
214274	2005 GF_{57}	—	April 6, 2005	Mount Lemmon	Mount Lemmon Survey	·	1.4 km	MPC · JPL
214275	2005 GK_{63}	—	April 2, 2005	Catalina	CSS	PHO	1.5 km	MPC · JPL
214276	2005 GQ_{63}	—	April 2, 2005	Catalina	CSS	·	1.6 km	MPC · JPL
214277	2005 GM_{67}	—	April 2, 2005	Mount Lemmon	Mount Lemmon Survey	·	1.5 km	MPC · JPL
214278	2005 GZ_{68}	—	April 2, 2005	Mount Lemmon	Mount Lemmon Survey	·	1.4 km	MPC · JPL
214279	2005 GQ_{75}	—	April 5, 2005	Mount Lemmon	Mount Lemmon Survey	·	1.8 km	MPC · JPL
214280	2005 GR_{76}	—	April 5, 2005	Mount Lemmon	Mount Lemmon Survey	·	1.1 km	MPC · JPL
214281	2005 GC_{88}	—	April 5, 2005	Anderson Mesa	LONEOS	·	2.1 km	MPC · JPL
214282	2005 GU_{99}	—	April 7, 2005	Mount Lemmon	Mount Lemmon Survey	·	1.7 km	MPC · JPL
214283	2005 GS_{107}	—	April 10, 2005	Mount Lemmon	Mount Lemmon Survey	·	1.3 km	MPC · JPL
214284	2005 GR_{132}	—	April 10, 2005	Kitt Peak	Spacewatch	·	1.5 km	MPC · JPL
214285	2005 GD_{154}	—	April 14, 2005	Kitt Peak	Spacewatch	·	1.9 km	MPC · JPL
214286	2005 GK_{155}	—	April 10, 2005	Mount Lemmon	Mount Lemmon Survey	·	1.4 km	MPC · JPL
214287	2005 GB_{158}	—	April 12, 2005	Kitt Peak	Spacewatch	·	2.2 km	MPC · JPL
214288	2005 GK_{174}	—	April 14, 2005	Kitt Peak	Spacewatch	·	1.8 km	MPC · JPL
214289	2005 GK_{182}	—	April 15, 2005	Catalina	CSS	·	3.3 km	MPC · JPL
214290 Leeannmarshall	2005 GT_{206}	Leeannmarshall	April 12, 2005	Kitt Peak	M. W. Buie	·	1.9 km	MPC · JPL
214291	2005 GQ_{209}	—	April 6, 2005	Catalina	CSS	·	6.7 km	MPC · JPL
214292	2005 GX_{215}	—	April 1, 2005	Anderson Mesa	LONEOS	·	1.5 km	MPC · JPL
214293	2005 HK_{1}	—	April 16, 2005	Kitt Peak	Spacewatch	·	1.1 km	MPC · JPL
214294	2005 HA_{5}	—	April 30, 2005	Kitt Peak	Spacewatch	·	1.6 km	MPC · JPL
214295	2005 HC_{5}	—	April 30, 2005	Kitt Peak	Spacewatch	EUN	1.4 km	MPC · JPL
214296	2005 HN_{5}	—	April 30, 2005	Campo Imperatore	CINEOS	·	2.1 km	MPC · JPL
214297	2005 HV_{9}	—	April 17, 2005	Kitt Peak	Spacewatch	·	1.9 km	MPC · JPL
214298	2005 HG_{10}	—	April 30, 2005	Siding Spring	SSS	·	5.0 km	MPC · JPL
214299	2005 JU	—	May 3, 2005	Socorro	LINEAR	·	2.1 km	MPC · JPL
214300	2005 JW	—	May 3, 2005	Socorro	LINEAR	·	1.8 km	MPC · JPL

== 214301–214400 ==
back to top

Designation			Discovery			Properties		Ref
Permanent	Provisional	Named after	Date	Site	Discoverer(s)	Category	Diam.	Ref
214301	2005 JU_{2}	—	May 3, 2005	Kitt Peak	Spacewatch	·	1.5 km	MPC · JPL
214302	2005 JA_{4}	—	May 3, 2005	Kitt Peak	Spacewatch	NYS	1.6 km	MPC · JPL
214303	2005 JH_{14}	—	May 1, 2005	Palomar	NEAT	·	2.6 km	MPC · JPL
214304	2005 JK_{15}	—	May 3, 2005	Kitt Peak	Spacewatch	NEM	3.1 km	MPC · JPL
214305	2005 JL_{15}	—	May 3, 2005	Kitt Peak	Spacewatch	·	1.4 km	MPC · JPL
214306	2005 JW_{19}	—	May 4, 2005	Mount Lemmon	Mount Lemmon Survey	·	2.7 km	MPC · JPL
214307	2005 JF_{22}	—	May 4, 2005	Cordell-Lorenz	D. T. Durig	·	2.3 km	MPC · JPL
214308	2005 JZ_{22}	—	May 2, 2005	Kitt Peak	Spacewatch	·	1.4 km	MPC · JPL
214309	2005 JP_{23}	—	May 3, 2005	Kitt Peak	Spacewatch	·	1.5 km	MPC · JPL
214310	2005 JE_{30}	—	May 4, 2005	Mount Lemmon	Mount Lemmon Survey	MAS	1.1 km	MPC · JPL
214311	2005 JP_{30}	—	May 4, 2005	Palomar	NEAT	·	2.0 km	MPC · JPL
214312	2005 JM_{31}	—	May 4, 2005	Palomar	NEAT	·	1.7 km	MPC · JPL
214313	2005 JT_{33}	—	May 4, 2005	Mount Lemmon	Mount Lemmon Survey	·	2.0 km	MPC · JPL
214314	2005 JX_{33}	—	May 4, 2005	Mount Lemmon	Mount Lemmon Survey	·	2.2 km	MPC · JPL
214315	2005 JC_{38}	—	May 6, 2005	Socorro	LINEAR	·	2.9 km	MPC · JPL
214316	2005 JF_{38}	—	May 6, 2005	Socorro	LINEAR	·	2.4 km	MPC · JPL
214317	2005 JQ_{42}	—	May 8, 2005	Kitt Peak	Spacewatch	·	2.9 km	MPC · JPL
214318	2005 JS_{42}	—	May 8, 2005	Mount Lemmon	Mount Lemmon Survey	·	2.3 km	MPC · JPL
214319	2005 JQ_{43}	—	May 8, 2005	Kitt Peak	Spacewatch	·	1.8 km	MPC · JPL
214320	2005 JR_{47}	—	May 3, 2005	Kitt Peak	Spacewatch	·	1.5 km	MPC · JPL
214321	2005 JQ_{51}	—	May 4, 2005	Kitt Peak	Spacewatch	·	1.9 km	MPC · JPL
214322	2005 JM_{55}	—	May 4, 2005	Kitt Peak	Spacewatch	·	2.3 km	MPC · JPL
214323	2005 JW_{55}	—	May 4, 2005	Palomar	NEAT	·	1.7 km	MPC · JPL
214324	2005 JL_{56}	—	May 6, 2005	Kitt Peak	Spacewatch	EUN	1.7 km	MPC · JPL
214325	2005 JT_{61}	—	May 8, 2005	Siding Spring	SSS	·	2.2 km	MPC · JPL
214326	2005 JG_{66}	—	May 4, 2005	Mount Lemmon	Mount Lemmon Survey	·	2.0 km	MPC · JPL
214327	2005 JQ_{66}	—	May 4, 2005	Palomar	NEAT	(5)	2.2 km	MPC · JPL
214328	2005 JR_{67}	—	May 4, 2005	Palomar	NEAT	EUN	1.7 km	MPC · JPL
214329	2005 JQ_{71}	—	May 7, 2005	Kitt Peak	Spacewatch	·	3.8 km	MPC · JPL
214330	2005 JS_{76}	—	May 9, 2005	Mount Lemmon	Mount Lemmon Survey	·	1.6 km	MPC · JPL
214331	2005 JA_{77}	—	May 9, 2005	Catalina	CSS	EUN	1.6 km	MPC · JPL
214332	2005 JZ_{78}	—	May 10, 2005	Mount Lemmon	Mount Lemmon Survey	slow	1.6 km	MPC · JPL
214333	2005 JZ_{81}	—	May 9, 2005	Kitt Peak	Spacewatch	·	1.8 km	MPC · JPL
214334	2005 JE_{84}	—	May 8, 2005	Kitt Peak	Spacewatch	·	1.5 km	MPC · JPL
214335	2005 JJ_{85}	—	May 8, 2005	Socorro	LINEAR	·	3.8 km	MPC · JPL
214336	2005 JX_{90}	—	May 11, 2005	Palomar	NEAT	·	2.2 km	MPC · JPL
214337	2005 JV_{93}	—	May 11, 2005	Palomar	NEAT	·	1.6 km	MPC · JPL
214338	2005 JO_{103}	—	May 10, 2005	Kitt Peak	Spacewatch	·	1.7 km	MPC · JPL
214339	2005 JO_{104}	—	May 10, 2005	Mount Lemmon	Mount Lemmon Survey	·	2.2 km	MPC · JPL
214340	2005 JD_{107}	—	May 12, 2005	Anderson Mesa	LONEOS	EUN	2.2 km	MPC · JPL
214341	2005 JK_{107}	—	May 12, 2005	Socorro	LINEAR	EUN	3.6 km	MPC · JPL
214342	2005 JK_{109}	—	May 14, 2005	Reedy Creek	J. Broughton	·	1.5 km	MPC · JPL
214343	2005 JE_{117}	—	May 10, 2005	Kitt Peak	Spacewatch	WIT	1.3 km	MPC · JPL
214344	2005 JQ_{126}	—	May 12, 2005	Catalina	CSS	·	1.6 km	MPC · JPL
214345	2005 JQ_{131}	—	May 13, 2005	Catalina	CSS	EUN	1.8 km	MPC · JPL
214346	2005 JS_{138}	—	May 13, 2005	Mount Lemmon	Mount Lemmon Survey	·	1.6 km	MPC · JPL
214347	2005 JF_{145}	—	May 15, 2005	Mount Lemmon	Mount Lemmon Survey	(5)	1.6 km	MPC · JPL
214348	2005 JT_{145}	—	May 12, 2005	Catalina	CSS	·	2.2 km	MPC · JPL
214349	2005 JL_{146}	—	May 11, 2005	Anderson Mesa	LONEOS	·	2.1 km	MPC · JPL
214350	2005 JJ_{156}	—	May 4, 2005	Mount Lemmon	Mount Lemmon Survey	·	1.8 km	MPC · JPL
214351	2005 JY_{159}	—	May 7, 2005	Mount Lemmon	Mount Lemmon Survey	·	1.5 km	MPC · JPL
214352	2005 JX_{163}	—	May 9, 2005	Anderson Mesa	LONEOS	·	2.9 km	MPC · JPL
214353	2005 JM_{167}	—	May 12, 2005	Socorro	LINEAR	·	2.0 km	MPC · JPL
214354	2005 JB_{176}	—	May 3, 2005	Catalina	CSS	EUN	1.6 km	MPC · JPL
214355	2005 JY_{180}	—	May 4, 2005	Kitt Peak	Spacewatch	·	1.6 km	MPC · JPL
214356	2005 KK	—	May 16, 2005	Kitt Peak	Spacewatch	·	1.2 km	MPC · JPL
214357	2005 KR_{1}	—	May 16, 2005	Mount Lemmon	Mount Lemmon Survey	·	2.1 km	MPC · JPL
214358	2005 KT_{6}	—	May 19, 2005	Palomar	NEAT	·	1.7 km	MPC · JPL
214359	2005 KU_{7}	—	May 20, 2005	Mount Lemmon	Mount Lemmon Survey	WIT	1.4 km	MPC · JPL
214360	2005 KZ_{7}	—	May 20, 2005	Mount Lemmon	Mount Lemmon Survey	·	2.8 km	MPC · JPL
214361	2005 KF_{9}	—	May 27, 2005	Campo Imperatore	CINEOS	·	3.1 km	MPC · JPL
214362	2005 KW_{9}	—	May 30, 2005	Reedy Creek	J. Broughton	·	2.3 km	MPC · JPL
214363	2005 KD_{13}	—	May 16, 2005	Mount Lemmon	Mount Lemmon Survey	·	1.5 km	MPC · JPL
214364	2005 LG	—	June 1, 2005	Mayhill	Lowe, A.	·	2.2 km	MPC · JPL
214365	2005 LJ_{2}	—	June 2, 2005	Catalina	CSS	EUN	2.1 km	MPC · JPL
214366	2005 LL_{2}	—	June 2, 2005	Catalina	CSS	·	4.2 km	MPC · JPL
214367	2005 LC_{3}	—	June 3, 2005	Siding Spring	SSS	·	1.8 km	MPC · JPL
214368	2005 LD_{5}	—	June 1, 2005	Mount Lemmon	Mount Lemmon Survey	·	3.7 km	MPC · JPL
214369	2005 LZ_{5}	—	June 3, 2005	Catalina	CSS	MAR	1.7 km	MPC · JPL
214370	2005 LL_{6}	—	June 4, 2005	Catalina	CSS	·	1.8 km	MPC · JPL
214371	2005 LO_{6}	—	June 4, 2005	Kitt Peak	Spacewatch	·	3.0 km	MPC · JPL
214372	2005 LN_{7}	—	June 4, 2005	Socorro	LINEAR	·	1.9 km	MPC · JPL
214373	2005 LZ_{7}	—	June 5, 2005	Kitt Peak	Spacewatch	·	1.8 km	MPC · JPL
214374	2005 LS_{9}	—	June 1, 2005	Kitt Peak	Spacewatch	·	3.4 km	MPC · JPL
214375	2005 LC_{10}	—	June 3, 2005	Kitt Peak	Spacewatch	·	1.5 km	MPC · JPL
214376	2005 LF_{20}	—	June 4, 2005	Kitt Peak	Spacewatch	L4 · ERY	10 km	MPC · JPL
214377	2005 LS_{21}	—	June 6, 2005	Kitt Peak	Spacewatch	·	2.9 km	MPC · JPL
214378 Kleinmann	2005 LW_{23}	Kleinmann	June 10, 2005	Vicques	M. Ory	KON	4.3 km	MPC · JPL
214379	2005 LX_{30}	—	June 4, 2005	Socorro	LINEAR	·	1.6 km	MPC · JPL
214380	2005 LZ_{30}	—	June 3, 2005	Siding Spring	SSS	EUN	2.0 km	MPC · JPL
214381	2005 LH_{34}	—	June 10, 2005	Kitt Peak	Spacewatch	·	4.0 km	MPC · JPL
214382	2005 LY_{36}	—	June 2, 2005	Siding Spring	SSS	·	1.8 km	MPC · JPL
214383	2005 LA_{44}	—	June 11, 2005	Catalina	CSS	BRG	2.8 km	MPC · JPL
214384	2005 LM_{47}	—	June 14, 2005	Mount Lemmon	Mount Lemmon Survey	KOR	1.9 km	MPC · JPL
214385	2005 LO_{49}	—	June 11, 2005	Kitt Peak	Spacewatch	·	2.0 km	MPC · JPL
214386	2005 MU_{1}	—	June 19, 2005	Socorro	LINEAR	·	4.9 km	MPC · JPL
214387	2005 MG_{2}	—	June 16, 2005	Mount Lemmon	Mount Lemmon Survey	·	2.3 km	MPC · JPL
214388	2005 MS_{12}	—	June 29, 2005	Palomar	NEAT	·	2.9 km	MPC · JPL
214389	2005 MR_{16}	—	June 27, 2005	Kitt Peak	Spacewatch	MAS	910 m	MPC · JPL
214390	2005 MQ_{23}	—	June 24, 2005	Palomar	NEAT	·	2.1 km	MPC · JPL
214391	2005 MY_{26}	—	June 29, 2005	Kitt Peak	Spacewatch	·	5.8 km	MPC · JPL
214392	2005 MV_{38}	—	June 30, 2005	Kitt Peak	Spacewatch	KOR	1.7 km	MPC · JPL
214393	2005 MK_{52}	—	June 30, 2005	Kitt Peak	Spacewatch	·	2.4 km	MPC · JPL
214394	2005 NR_{2}	—	July 2, 2005	Kitt Peak	Spacewatch	·	2.3 km	MPC · JPL
214395	2005 NT_{11}	—	July 4, 2005	Palomar	NEAT	·	3.8 km	MPC · JPL
214396	2005 NF_{14}	—	July 5, 2005	Kitt Peak	Spacewatch	·	3.0 km	MPC · JPL
214397	2005 NV_{14}	—	July 6, 2005	Mayhill	Sue, J.	·	4.4 km	MPC · JPL
214398	2005 NX_{20}	—	July 6, 2005	Reedy Creek	J. Broughton	·	1.8 km	MPC · JPL
214399	2005 NO_{22}	—	July 1, 2005	Kitt Peak	Spacewatch	·	2.0 km	MPC · JPL
214400	2005 NW_{47}	—	July 7, 2005	Kitt Peak	Spacewatch	·	5.1 km	MPC · JPL

== 214401–214500 ==
back to top

Designation			Discovery			Properties		Ref
Permanent	Provisional	Named after	Date	Site	Discoverer(s)	Category	Diam.	Ref
214401	2005 NV_{48}	—	July 10, 2005	Kitt Peak	Spacewatch	EOS	2.9 km	MPC · JPL
214402	2005 NB_{54}	—	July 10, 2005	Kitt Peak	Spacewatch	·	4.9 km	MPC · JPL
214403	2005 NG_{58}	—	July 6, 2005	Kitt Peak	Spacewatch	·	2.3 km	MPC · JPL
214404	2005 NS_{67}	—	July 3, 2005	Palomar	NEAT	·	2.4 km	MPC · JPL
214405	2005 NG_{77}	—	July 10, 2005	Kitt Peak	Spacewatch	·	3.4 km	MPC · JPL
214406	2005 NH_{85}	—	July 3, 2005	Mount Lemmon	Mount Lemmon Survey	·	2.8 km	MPC · JPL
214407	2005 NN_{85}	—	July 3, 2005	Mount Lemmon	Mount Lemmon Survey	·	3.5 km	MPC · JPL
214408	2005 NH_{87}	—	July 3, 2005	Mount Lemmon	Mount Lemmon Survey	MAS	770 m	MPC · JPL
214409	2005 NQ_{87}	—	July 4, 2005	Kitt Peak	Spacewatch	KOR	1.5 km	MPC · JPL
214410	2005 OG_{2}	—	July 27, 2005	Reedy Creek	J. Broughton	WAT	2.9 km	MPC · JPL
214411	2005 OL_{2}	—	July 26, 2005	Palomar	NEAT	·	3.4 km	MPC · JPL
214412	2005 OY_{16}	—	July 30, 2005	Palomar	NEAT	·	3.6 km	MPC · JPL
214413	2005 OB_{17}	—	July 30, 2005	Palomar	NEAT	·	4.1 km	MPC · JPL
214414	2005 OV_{26}	—	July 27, 2005	Palomar	NEAT	MRX	1.4 km	MPC · JPL
214415	2005 OZ_{27}	—	July 29, 2005	Palomar	NEAT	·	2.4 km	MPC · JPL
214416	2005 PK	—	August 2, 2005	Lake Tekapo	A. C. Gilmore	·	3.2 km	MPC · JPL
214417	2005 PJ_{4}	—	August 4, 2005	Palomar	NEAT	URS	4.6 km	MPC · JPL
214418	2005 PH_{15}	—	August 4, 2005	Palomar	NEAT	·	6.0 km	MPC · JPL
214419	2005 PZ_{15}	—	August 4, 2005	Palomar	NEAT	·	2.5 km	MPC · JPL
214420	2005 PF_{22}	—	August 6, 2005	Palomar	NEAT	EOS	2.8 km	MPC · JPL
214421	2005 QN_{2}	—	August 24, 2005	Palomar	NEAT	·	1.3 km	MPC · JPL
214422	2005 QE_{6}	—	August 24, 2005	Palomar	NEAT	TIR	3.8 km	MPC · JPL
214423	2005 QY_{10}	—	August 27, 2005	Junk Bond	D. Healy	·	3.1 km	MPC · JPL
214424	2005 QG_{16}	—	August 25, 2005	Palomar	NEAT	THM	2.8 km	MPC · JPL
214425	2005 QL_{16}	—	August 25, 2005	Palomar	NEAT	VER	5.1 km	MPC · JPL
214426	2005 QZ_{18}	—	August 25, 2005	Palomar	NEAT	THM	3.1 km	MPC · JPL
214427	2005 QS_{27}	—	August 27, 2005	Kitt Peak	Spacewatch	HYG	5.1 km	MPC · JPL
214428	2005 QG_{28}	—	August 27, 2005	Kitt Peak	Spacewatch	·	3.4 km	MPC · JPL
214429	2005 QT_{42}	—	August 26, 2005	Anderson Mesa	LONEOS	·	2.7 km	MPC · JPL
214430	2005 QJ_{54}	—	August 28, 2005	Kitt Peak	Spacewatch	EOS	2.4 km	MPC · JPL
214431	2005 QN_{54}	—	August 28, 2005	Kitt Peak	Spacewatch	THM	3.2 km	MPC · JPL
214432 Belprahon	2005 QA_{57}	Belprahon	August 29, 2005	Vicques	M. Ory	·	3.6 km	MPC · JPL
214433	2005 QF_{67}	—	August 28, 2005	Kitt Peak	Spacewatch	·	4.0 km	MPC · JPL
214434	2005 QY_{73}	—	August 29, 2005	Anderson Mesa	LONEOS	·	5.3 km	MPC · JPL
214435	2005 QM_{78}	—	August 25, 2005	Palomar	NEAT	EOS	2.8 km	MPC · JPL
214436	2005 QU_{83}	—	August 29, 2005	Anderson Mesa	LONEOS	·	4.7 km	MPC · JPL
214437	2005 QY_{106}	—	August 27, 2005	Palomar	NEAT	SYL · CYB	6.8 km	MPC · JPL
214438	2005 QF_{115}	—	August 27, 2005	Palomar	NEAT	·	4.4 km	MPC · JPL
214439	2005 QS_{121}	—	August 28, 2005	Kitt Peak	Spacewatch	VER	3.5 km	MPC · JPL
214440	2005 QR_{140}	—	August 29, 2005	Kitt Peak	Spacewatch	·	2.8 km	MPC · JPL
214441	2005 QN_{149}	—	August 28, 2005	Siding Spring	SSS	·	2.9 km	MPC · JPL
214442	2005 QQ_{175}	—	August 31, 2005	Palomar	NEAT	EOS	2.8 km	MPC · JPL
214443	2005 QZ_{187}	—	August 30, 2005	Kitt Peak	Spacewatch	·	3.2 km	MPC · JPL
214444	2005 RH_{4}	—	September 4, 2005	Bergisch Gladbach	W. Bickel	·	3.4 km	MPC · JPL
214445	2005 RS_{18}	—	September 1, 2005	Kitt Peak	Spacewatch	·	5.2 km	MPC · JPL
214446	2005 ST_{3}	—	September 23, 2005	Kitt Peak	Spacewatch	·	7.6 km	MPC · JPL
214447	2005 SA_{9}	—	September 25, 2005	Catalina	CSS	·	6.8 km	MPC · JPL
214448	2005 SX_{23}	—	September 23, 2005	Catalina	CSS	(31811)	3.6 km	MPC · JPL
214449	2005 SC_{31}	—	September 23, 2005	Catalina	CSS	·	4.4 km	MPC · JPL
214450	2005 SU_{47}	—	September 24, 2005	Kitt Peak	Spacewatch	·	3.6 km	MPC · JPL
214451	2005 SL_{56}	—	September 25, 2005	Kitt Peak	Spacewatch	THM	3.1 km	MPC · JPL
214452	2005 SC_{70}	—	September 27, 2005	Palomar	NEAT	·	5.5 km	MPC · JPL
214453	2005 SO_{73}	—	September 23, 2005	Kitt Peak	Spacewatch	·	6.3 km	MPC · JPL
214454	2005 SE_{77}	—	September 24, 2005	Kitt Peak	Spacewatch	fast	2.9 km	MPC · JPL
214455	2005 SL_{80}	—	September 24, 2005	Kitt Peak	Spacewatch	THM	3.6 km	MPC · JPL
214456	2005 SL_{81}	—	September 24, 2005	Kitt Peak	Spacewatch	THM	2.8 km	MPC · JPL
214457	2005 SZ_{89}	—	September 24, 2005	Kitt Peak	Spacewatch	·	5.4 km	MPC · JPL
214458	2005 SS_{99}	—	September 25, 2005	Kitt Peak	Spacewatch	·	2.9 km	MPC · JPL
214459	2005 SX_{114}	—	September 27, 2005	Kitt Peak	Spacewatch	·	4.2 km	MPC · JPL
214460	2005 SM_{128}	—	September 29, 2005	Anderson Mesa	LONEOS	·	5.2 km	MPC · JPL
214461	2005 SN_{130}	—	September 29, 2005	Palomar	NEAT	·	6.7 km	MPC · JPL
214462	2005 SL_{132}	—	September 29, 2005	Kitt Peak	Spacewatch	·	4.8 km	MPC · JPL
214463	2005 SK_{138}	—	September 25, 2005	Kitt Peak	Spacewatch	THM	3.1 km	MPC · JPL
214464	2005 SW_{146}	—	September 25, 2005	Kitt Peak	Spacewatch	TIR	4.0 km	MPC · JPL
214465	2005 SO_{166}	—	September 28, 2005	Palomar	NEAT	·	3.5 km	MPC · JPL
214466	2005 SY_{169}	—	September 29, 2005	Kitt Peak	Spacewatch	·	5.1 km	MPC · JPL
214467	2005 ST_{196}	—	September 30, 2005	Kitt Peak	Spacewatch	·	3.8 km	MPC · JPL
214468	2005 SH_{202}	—	September 30, 2005	Mount Lemmon	Mount Lemmon Survey	·	3.9 km	MPC · JPL
214469	2005 SG_{213}	—	September 30, 2005	Mount Lemmon	Mount Lemmon Survey	·	5.5 km	MPC · JPL
214470	2005 SU_{221}	—	September 27, 2005	Socorro	LINEAR	LIX	5.6 km	MPC · JPL
214471	2005 SO_{249}	—	September 23, 2005	Kitt Peak	Spacewatch	·	4.0 km	MPC · JPL
214472	2005 SO_{282}	—	September 22, 2005	Apache Point	A. C. Becker	3:2	6.8 km	MPC · JPL
214473	2005 TH_{2}	—	October 1, 2005	Mount Lemmon	Mount Lemmon Survey	·	5.0 km	MPC · JPL
214474 Long Island	2005 TB_{14}	Long Island	October 1, 2005	Catalina	CSS	·	3.9 km	MPC · JPL
214475 Chrisbayus	2005 TS_{14}	Chrisbayus	October 3, 2005	Catalina	CSS	·	4.1 km	MPC · JPL
214476 Stephencolbert	2005 TO_{15}	Stephencolbert	October 3, 2005	Catalina	CSS	VER	4.6 km	MPC · JPL
214477	2005 TX_{44}	—	October 5, 2005	Socorro	LINEAR	·	6.0 km	MPC · JPL
214478	2005 TR_{63}	—	October 6, 2005	Anderson Mesa	LONEOS	·	3.3 km	MPC · JPL
214479	2005 TB_{73}	—	October 5, 2005	Catalina	CSS	·	6.8 km	MPC · JPL
214480	2005 TH_{74}	—	October 7, 2005	Anderson Mesa	LONEOS	CYB	6.8 km	MPC · JPL
214481	2005 TQ_{99}	—	October 7, 2005	Socorro	LINEAR	·	2.9 km	MPC · JPL
214482	2005 TF_{106}	—	October 9, 2005	Kitt Peak	Spacewatch	CYB	5.1 km	MPC · JPL
214483	2005 TV_{168}	—	October 9, 2005	Kitt Peak	Spacewatch	3:2 · SHU	8.9 km	MPC · JPL
214484	2005 TW_{190}	—	October 10, 2005	Catalina	CSS	·	4.8 km	MPC · JPL
214485 Dupouy	2005 UV_{7}	Dupouy	October 26, 2005	Ottmarsheim	C. Rinner	·	3.7 km	MPC · JPL
214486	2005 UF_{10}	—	October 21, 2005	Palomar	NEAT	·	4.1 km	MPC · JPL
214487 Baranivka	2005 UP_{12}	Baranivka	October 29, 2005	Andrushivka	Andrushivka	HYG	4.7 km	MPC · JPL
214488	2005 UL_{45}	—	October 22, 2005	Catalina	CSS	·	4.3 km	MPC · JPL
214489	2005 UD_{48}	—	October 22, 2005	Palomar	NEAT	·	2.1 km	MPC · JPL
214490	2005 UW_{53}	—	October 23, 2005	Catalina	CSS	EUP	5.1 km	MPC · JPL
214491	2005 UB_{127}	—	October 24, 2005	Kitt Peak	Spacewatch	TIR	4.1 km	MPC · JPL
214492	2005 UA_{208}	—	October 27, 2005	Kitt Peak	Spacewatch	THM	3.6 km	MPC · JPL
214493	2005 US_{251}	—	October 24, 2005	Kitt Peak	Spacewatch	·	5.3 km	MPC · JPL
214494	2005 UD_{253}	—	October 27, 2005	Kitt Peak	Spacewatch	·	2.9 km	MPC · JPL
214495	2005 UO_{435}	—	October 29, 2005	Mount Lemmon	Mount Lemmon Survey	·	4.0 km	MPC · JPL
214496	2005 VW_{52}	—	November 3, 2005	Mount Lemmon	Mount Lemmon Survey	MRX	1.5 km	MPC · JPL
214497	2005 VK_{82}	—	November 13, 2005	Catalina	CSS	H	850 m	MPC · JPL
214498	2005 WZ_{4}	—	November 19, 2005	Palomar	NEAT	THB	5.4 km	MPC · JPL
214499	2005 WG_{52}	—	November 25, 2005	Mount Lemmon	Mount Lemmon Survey	·	4.9 km	MPC · JPL
214500	2005 WA_{154}	—	November 29, 2005	Palomar	NEAT	HYG	4.3 km	MPC · JPL

== 214501–214600 ==
back to top

Designation			Discovery			Properties		Ref
Permanent	Provisional	Named after	Date	Site	Discoverer(s)	Category	Diam.	Ref
214501	2005 WZ_{192}	—	November 26, 2005	Catalina	CSS	·	4.8 km	MPC · JPL
214502	2005 WN_{195}	—	November 28, 2005	Catalina	CSS	H	920 m	MPC · JPL
214503	2005 XA_{61}	—	December 4, 2005	Kitt Peak	Spacewatch	·	840 m	MPC · JPL
214504	2005 YG	—	December 20, 2005	Socorro	LINEAR	H	960 m	MPC · JPL
214505	2005 YJ_{120}	—	December 27, 2005	Mount Lemmon	Mount Lemmon Survey	·	1.5 km	MPC · JPL
214506	2005 YW_{236}	—	December 28, 2005	Kitt Peak	Spacewatch	L5	9.2 km	MPC · JPL
214507	2006 AF_{19}	—	January 5, 2006	Mount Lemmon	Mount Lemmon Survey	·	2.5 km	MPC · JPL
214508	2006 AF_{84}	—	January 6, 2006	Catalina	CSS	L5	17 km	MPC · JPL
214509	2006 BO_{89}	—	January 25, 2006	Kitt Peak	Spacewatch	·	2.1 km	MPC · JPL
214510	2006 BZ_{164}	—	January 26, 2006	Kitt Peak	Spacewatch	·	2.8 km	MPC · JPL
214511	2006 BA_{213}	—	January 29, 2006	Bergisch Gladbach	W. Bickel	L5	14 km	MPC · JPL
214512	2006 BL_{264}	—	January 31, 2006	Kitt Peak	Spacewatch	NYS	1.6 km	MPC · JPL
214513	2006 CM_{15}	—	February 1, 2006	Kitt Peak	Spacewatch	EOS	3.3 km	MPC · JPL
214514	2006 DB_{20}	—	February 20, 2006	Kitt Peak	Spacewatch	L5	10 km	MPC · JPL
214515	2006 DX_{194}	—	February 28, 2006	Mount Lemmon	Mount Lemmon Survey	KOR	1.8 km	MPC · JPL
214516	2006 EH_{63}	—	March 5, 2006	Kitt Peak	Spacewatch	·	2.7 km	MPC · JPL
214517	2006 FO	—	March 22, 2006	Catalina	CSS	·	5.8 km	MPC · JPL
214518	2006 GC_{33}	—	April 7, 2006	Kitt Peak	Spacewatch	·	2.3 km	MPC · JPL
214519	2006 HU_{26}	—	April 20, 2006	Kitt Peak	Spacewatch	·	1.0 km	MPC · JPL
214520	2006 HG_{78}	—	April 26, 2006	Kitt Peak	Spacewatch	·	1.6 km	MPC · JPL
214521	2006 HO_{92}	—	April 29, 2006	Kitt Peak	Spacewatch	·	1.0 km	MPC · JPL
214522	2006 HF_{97}	—	April 30, 2006	Kitt Peak	Spacewatch	·	930 m	MPC · JPL
214523	2006 JD_{17}	—	May 2, 2006	Kitt Peak	Spacewatch	·	1.3 km	MPC · JPL
214524	2006 JC_{35}	—	May 4, 2006	Kitt Peak	Spacewatch	·	1.4 km	MPC · JPL
214525	2006 KH_{4}	—	May 19, 2006	Mount Lemmon	Mount Lemmon Survey	·	770 m	MPC · JPL
214526	2006 KD_{6}	—	May 19, 2006	Mount Lemmon	Mount Lemmon Survey	·	700 m	MPC · JPL
214527	2006 KV_{7}	—	May 19, 2006	Mount Lemmon	Mount Lemmon Survey	·	1.2 km	MPC · JPL
214528	2006 KS_{41}	—	May 19, 2006	Palomar	NEAT	·	2.0 km	MPC · JPL
214529	2006 KU_{41}	—	May 20, 2006	Mount Lemmon	Mount Lemmon Survey	·	1.7 km	MPC · JPL
214530	2006 KG_{50}	—	May 21, 2006	Kitt Peak	Spacewatch	·	780 m	MPC · JPL
214531	2006 KZ_{94}	—	May 25, 2006	Kitt Peak	Spacewatch	·	1.4 km	MPC · JPL
214532	2006 KP_{98}	—	May 26, 2006	Kitt Peak	Spacewatch	V	690 m	MPC · JPL
214533	2006 LF_{5}	—	June 10, 2006	Palomar	NEAT	·	1.1 km	MPC · JPL
214534	2006 LC_{6}	—	June 3, 2006	Mount Lemmon	Mount Lemmon Survey	·	1.0 km	MPC · JPL
214535	2006 MR_{3}	—	June 19, 2006	Hibiscus	S. F. Hönig	·	1.1 km	MPC · JPL
214536	2006 ME_{6}	—	June 19, 2006	Mount Lemmon	Mount Lemmon Survey	V	1.2 km	MPC · JPL
214537	2006 MV_{9}	—	June 21, 2006	Palomar	NEAT	NYS	1.9 km	MPC · JPL
214538	2006 ON_{3}	—	July 21, 2006	Palomar	NEAT	·	1.3 km	MPC · JPL
214539	2006 OW_{7}	—	July 19, 2006	Palomar	NEAT	NYS	1.5 km	MPC · JPL
214540	2006 OB_{9}	—	July 20, 2006	Palomar	NEAT	·	1.3 km	MPC · JPL
214541	2006 OE_{9}	—	July 20, 2006	Palomar	NEAT	MAS	1.0 km	MPC · JPL
214542	2006 OV_{9}	—	July 24, 2006	Altschwendt	W. Ries	MAS	750 m	MPC · JPL
214543	2006 OY_{9}	—	July 18, 2006	Socorro	LINEAR	NYS	1.2 km	MPC · JPL
214544	2006 OP_{13}	—	July 24, 2006	Socorro	LINEAR	·	1.3 km	MPC · JPL
214545	2006 OV_{17}	—	July 18, 2006	Siding Spring	SSS	V	1.1 km	MPC · JPL
214546	2006 OF_{20}	—	July 18, 2006	Siding Spring	SSS	·	2.0 km	MPC · JPL
214547	2006 OC_{21}	—	July 21, 2006	Mount Lemmon	Mount Lemmon Survey	·	1.0 km	MPC · JPL
214548	2006 PL_{7}	—	August 12, 2006	Palomar	NEAT	MAS	1.1 km	MPC · JPL
214549	2006 PB_{9}	—	August 13, 2006	Palomar	NEAT	MAS	980 m	MPC · JPL
214550	2006 PD_{14}	—	August 14, 2006	Siding Spring	SSS	V	980 m	MPC · JPL
214551	2006 PF_{15}	—	August 15, 2006	Palomar	NEAT	·	3.1 km	MPC · JPL
214552	2006 PG_{16}	—	August 15, 2006	Palomar	NEAT	·	1.0 km	MPC · JPL
214553	2006 PL_{16}	—	August 15, 2006	Palomar	NEAT	·	1.3 km	MPC · JPL
214554	2006 PD_{20}	—	August 14, 2006	Siding Spring	SSS	·	1.2 km	MPC · JPL
214555	2006 PR_{23}	—	August 12, 2006	Palomar	NEAT	·	1.2 km	MPC · JPL
214556	2006 PD_{35}	—	August 12, 2006	Palomar	NEAT	·	990 m	MPC · JPL
214557	2006 PS_{35}	—	August 12, 2006	Palomar	NEAT	V	990 m	MPC · JPL
214558 Korányi	2006 QB_{1}	Korányi	August 18, 2006	Piszkéstető	K. Sárneczky	·	1.9 km	MPC · JPL
214559	2006 QS_{1}	—	August 17, 2006	Palomar	NEAT	·	1.8 km	MPC · JPL
214560	2006 QG_{5}	—	August 19, 2006	Kitt Peak	Spacewatch	VER	4.3 km	MPC · JPL
214561	2006 QU_{5}	—	August 18, 2006	Reedy Creek	J. Broughton	·	2.0 km	MPC · JPL
214562	2006 QE_{8}	—	August 19, 2006	Kitt Peak	Spacewatch	AGN	1.9 km	MPC · JPL
214563	2006 QD_{10}	—	August 20, 2006	Kitt Peak	Spacewatch	(17392)	2.1 km	MPC · JPL
214564	2006 QD_{13}	—	August 16, 2006	Siding Spring	SSS	·	1.4 km	MPC · JPL
214565	2006 QH_{13}	—	August 16, 2006	Siding Spring	SSS	·	900 m	MPC · JPL
214566	2006 QU_{13}	—	August 17, 2006	Palomar	NEAT	·	4.9 km	MPC · JPL
214567	2006 QK_{16}	—	August 17, 2006	Palomar	NEAT	·	2.1 km	MPC · JPL
214568	2006 QV_{21}	—	August 19, 2006	Anderson Mesa	LONEOS	·	1.9 km	MPC · JPL
214569	2006 QZ_{25}	—	August 19, 2006	Kitt Peak	Spacewatch	·	3.8 km	MPC · JPL
214570	2006 QN_{28}	—	August 21, 2006	Socorro	LINEAR	·	2.7 km	MPC · JPL
214571	2006 QK_{35}	—	August 17, 2006	Palomar	NEAT	MAS	870 m	MPC · JPL
214572	2006 QV_{36}	—	August 16, 2006	Siding Spring	SSS	NYS	1.7 km	MPC · JPL
214573	2006 QH_{38}	—	August 17, 2006	Socorro	LINEAR	JUN	1.6 km	MPC · JPL
214574	2006 QU_{38}	—	August 18, 2006	Anderson Mesa	LONEOS	·	1.5 km	MPC · JPL
214575	2006 QJ_{42}	—	August 17, 2006	Palomar	NEAT	·	1.7 km	MPC · JPL
214576	2006 QL_{45}	—	August 19, 2006	Kitt Peak	Spacewatch	·	1.5 km	MPC · JPL
214577	2006 QN_{45}	—	August 19, 2006	Kitt Peak	Spacewatch	MAS	880 m	MPC · JPL
214578	2006 QB_{46}	—	August 19, 2006	Palomar	NEAT	·	2.2 km	MPC · JPL
214579	2006 QB_{48}	—	August 21, 2006	Kitt Peak	Spacewatch	·	1.4 km	MPC · JPL
214580	2006 QB_{50}	—	August 22, 2006	Palomar	NEAT	·	4.1 km	MPC · JPL
214581	2006 QG_{51}	—	August 23, 2006	Socorro	LINEAR	MAS	1.1 km	MPC · JPL
214582	2006 QJ_{52}	—	August 23, 2006	Palomar	NEAT	·	2.2 km	MPC · JPL
214583	2006 QL_{52}	—	August 23, 2006	Palomar	NEAT	·	1.7 km	MPC · JPL
214584	2006 QN_{55}	—	August 21, 2006	Socorro	LINEAR	·	2.1 km	MPC · JPL
214585	2006 QM_{62}	—	August 23, 2006	Socorro	LINEAR	·	1.5 km	MPC · JPL
214586	2006 QU_{67}	—	August 21, 2006	Kitt Peak	Spacewatch	·	2.2 km	MPC · JPL
214587	2006 QT_{74}	—	August 21, 2006	Kitt Peak	Spacewatch	·	1.9 km	MPC · JPL
214588	2006 QX_{81}	—	August 24, 2006	Palomar	NEAT	·	2.6 km	MPC · JPL
214589	2006 QO_{82}	—	August 25, 2006	Socorro	LINEAR	·	1.5 km	MPC · JPL
214590	2006 QC_{89}	—	August 27, 2006	Kitt Peak	Spacewatch	KOR	2.0 km	MPC · JPL
214591	2006 QN_{110}	—	August 28, 2006	Anderson Mesa	LONEOS	·	2.1 km	MPC · JPL
214592	2006 QX_{125}	—	August 16, 2006	Palomar	NEAT	·	2.6 km	MPC · JPL
214593	2006 QH_{131}	—	August 21, 2006	Palomar	NEAT	·	1.5 km	MPC · JPL
214594	2006 QS_{132}	—	August 23, 2006	Palomar	NEAT	·	2.0 km	MPC · JPL
214595	2006 QC_{136}	—	August 28, 2006	Socorro	LINEAR	·	2.4 km	MPC · JPL
214596	2006 QF_{148}	—	August 18, 2006	Kitt Peak	Spacewatch	MAS	1.1 km	MPC · JPL
214597	2006 QO_{148}	—	August 18, 2006	Kitt Peak	Spacewatch	·	2.3 km	MPC · JPL
214598	2006 QX_{148}	—	August 18, 2006	Kitt Peak	Spacewatch	·	1.7 km	MPC · JPL
214599	2006 QO_{161}	—	August 19, 2006	Kitt Peak	Spacewatch	·	2.1 km	MPC · JPL
214600	2006 QW_{162}	—	August 21, 2006	Kitt Peak	Spacewatch	·	2.0 km	MPC · JPL

== 214601–214700 ==
back to top

Designation			Discovery			Properties		Ref
Permanent	Provisional	Named after	Date	Site	Discoverer(s)	Category	Diam.	Ref
214601	2006 QY_{165}	—	August 29, 2006	Catalina	CSS	WIT	1.5 km	MPC · JPL
214602	2006 QM_{167}	—	August 30, 2006	Anderson Mesa	LONEOS	·	3.0 km	MPC · JPL
214603	2006 QD_{182}	—	August 28, 2006	Anderson Mesa	LONEOS	·	4.0 km	MPC · JPL
214604	2006 RW_{6}	—	September 14, 2006	Catalina	CSS	·	1.5 km	MPC · JPL
214605	2006 RR_{11}	—	September 12, 2006	Catalina	CSS	·	2.5 km	MPC · JPL
214606	2006 RE_{19}	—	September 14, 2006	Catalina	CSS	·	2.7 km	MPC · JPL
214607	2006 RF_{22}	—	September 15, 2006	Palomar	NEAT	·	2.4 km	MPC · JPL
214608	2006 RB_{23}	—	September 12, 2006	Socorro	LINEAR	·	4.5 km	MPC · JPL
214609	2006 RE_{33}	—	September 14, 2006	Catalina	CSS	·	1.8 km	MPC · JPL
214610	2006 RL_{34}	—	September 12, 2006	Catalina	CSS	·	2.9 km	MPC · JPL
214611	2006 RH_{36}	—	September 14, 2006	Palomar	NEAT	EUN	2.0 km	MPC · JPL
214612	2006 RS_{36}	—	September 12, 2006	Catalina	CSS	·	2.8 km	MPC · JPL
214613	2006 RA_{39}	—	September 14, 2006	Catalina	CSS	NYS	1.4 km	MPC · JPL
214614	2006 RN_{44}	—	September 14, 2006	Kitt Peak	Spacewatch	·	1.3 km	MPC · JPL
214615	2006 RP_{51}	—	September 14, 2006	Kitt Peak	Spacewatch	EOS	2.6 km	MPC · JPL
214616	2006 RQ_{52}	—	September 14, 2006	Kitt Peak	Spacewatch	·	3.7 km	MPC · JPL
214617	2006 RP_{56}	—	September 14, 2006	Kitt Peak	Spacewatch	·	2.1 km	MPC · JPL
214618	2006 RP_{58}	—	September 15, 2006	Kitt Peak	Spacewatch	HOF	3.2 km	MPC · JPL
214619	2006 RC_{65}	—	September 14, 2006	Palomar	NEAT	·	2.6 km	MPC · JPL
214620	2006 RG_{66}	—	September 14, 2006	Palomar	NEAT	·	2.1 km	MPC · JPL
214621	2006 RQ_{76}	—	September 15, 2006	Kitt Peak	Spacewatch	AST	3.0 km	MPC · JPL
214622	2006 RC_{79}	—	September 15, 2006	Kitt Peak	Spacewatch	AST	3.1 km	MPC · JPL
214623	2006 RT_{84}	—	September 15, 2006	Kitt Peak	Spacewatch	·	2.2 km	MPC · JPL
214624	2006 RE_{85}	—	September 15, 2006	Kitt Peak	Spacewatch	·	1.6 km	MPC · JPL
214625	2006 RC_{91}	—	September 15, 2006	Kitt Peak	Spacewatch	·	1.8 km	MPC · JPL
214626	2006 RU_{91}	—	September 15, 2006	Kitt Peak	Spacewatch	·	1.6 km	MPC · JPL
214627	2006 RR_{93}	—	September 15, 2006	Kitt Peak	Spacewatch	PAD	3.1 km	MPC · JPL
214628	2006 RU_{96}	—	September 15, 2006	Kitt Peak	Spacewatch	·	2.5 km	MPC · JPL
214629	2006 RO_{98}	—	September 14, 2006	Catalina	CSS	BRA	1.9 km	MPC · JPL
214630	2006 RU_{98}	—	September 14, 2006	Catalina	CSS	AST	2.2 km	MPC · JPL
214631	2006 RH_{99}	—	September 15, 2006	Kitt Peak	Spacewatch	·	4.7 km	MPC · JPL
214632	2006 RT_{101}	—	September 14, 2006	Catalina	CSS	(2076)	1.1 km	MPC · JPL
214633	2006 RP_{120}	—	September 14, 2006	Kitt Peak	Spacewatch	·	1.3 km	MPC · JPL
214634	2006 SR_{4}	—	September 16, 2006	Catalina	CSS	EUN	2.9 km	MPC · JPL
214635	2006 SY_{4}	—	September 16, 2006	Palomar	NEAT	PAD	3.9 km	MPC · JPL
214636	2006 SB_{12}	—	September 16, 2006	Catalina	CSS	·	7.2 km	MPC · JPL
214637	2006 SN_{18}	—	September 17, 2006	Kitt Peak	Spacewatch	·	2.3 km	MPC · JPL
214638	2006 SY_{19}	—	September 19, 2006	La Sagra	OAM	HYG	4.4 km	MPC · JPL
214639	2006 SU_{23}	—	September 18, 2006	Catalina	CSS	·	2.6 km	MPC · JPL
214640	2006 SB_{41}	—	September 18, 2006	Kitt Peak	Spacewatch	AST	3.1 km	MPC · JPL
214641	2006 SY_{52}	—	September 18, 2006	Catalina	CSS	·	4.1 km	MPC · JPL
214642	2006 SA_{56}	—	September 18, 2006	Kitt Peak	Spacewatch	EOS	2.5 km	MPC · JPL
214643	2006 SA_{57}	—	September 18, 2006	Calvin-Rehoboth	Calvin College	·	2.3 km	MPC · JPL
214644	2006 SM_{60}	—	September 18, 2006	Catalina	CSS	·	3.2 km	MPC · JPL
214645	2006 SA_{62}	—	September 18, 2006	Catalina	CSS	·	3.3 km	MPC · JPL
214646	2006 SA_{67}	—	September 19, 2006	Kitt Peak	Spacewatch	THM	2.7 km	MPC · JPL
214647	2006 SL_{69}	—	September 19, 2006	Kitt Peak	Spacewatch	·	2.3 km	MPC · JPL
214648	2006 SQ_{71}	—	September 19, 2006	Kitt Peak	Spacewatch	·	2.1 km	MPC · JPL
214649	2006 SB_{72}	—	September 19, 2006	Kitt Peak	Spacewatch	·	2.4 km	MPC · JPL
214650	2006 SK_{74}	—	September 19, 2006	Kitt Peak	Spacewatch	·	2.8 km	MPC · JPL
214651	2006 SK_{75}	—	September 19, 2006	Kitt Peak	Spacewatch	EOS	2.7 km	MPC · JPL
214652	2006 SR_{75}	—	September 19, 2006	Kitt Peak	Spacewatch	·	3.6 km	MPC · JPL
214653	2006 SZ_{76}	—	September 20, 2006	Anderson Mesa	LONEOS	·	2.5 km	MPC · JPL
214654	2006 SW_{82}	—	September 18, 2006	Kitt Peak	Spacewatch	·	1.4 km	MPC · JPL
214655	2006 SV_{93}	—	September 18, 2006	Kitt Peak	Spacewatch	·	2.3 km	MPC · JPL
214656	2006 SV_{98}	—	September 18, 2006	Kitt Peak	Spacewatch	·	1.7 km	MPC · JPL
214657	2006 SQ_{101}	—	September 19, 2006	Catalina	CSS	NYS	1.4 km	MPC · JPL
214658	2006 ST_{101}	—	September 19, 2006	Catalina	CSS	EOS	2.4 km	MPC · JPL
214659	2006 SX_{108}	—	September 19, 2006	Kitt Peak	Spacewatch	·	2.0 km	MPC · JPL
214660	2006 SV_{110}	—	September 20, 2006	Haleakala	NEAT	·	2.4 km	MPC · JPL
214661	2006 SM_{111}	—	September 22, 2006	Socorro	LINEAR	·	2.3 km	MPC · JPL
214662	2006 SF_{115}	—	September 24, 2006	Kitt Peak	Spacewatch	·	3.8 km	MPC · JPL
214663	2006 SZ_{119}	—	September 18, 2006	Catalina	CSS	·	3.2 km	MPC · JPL
214664	2006 SS_{122}	—	September 19, 2006	Anderson Mesa	LONEOS	ADE	3.6 km	MPC · JPL
214665	2006 SF_{128}	—	September 17, 2006	Anderson Mesa	LONEOS	·	2.6 km	MPC · JPL
214666	2006 SM_{130}	—	September 20, 2006	Anderson Mesa	LONEOS	·	2.1 km	MPC · JPL
214667	2006 SW_{137}	—	September 20, 2006	Catalina	CSS	·	4.3 km	MPC · JPL
214668	2006 SL_{142}	—	September 19, 2006	Catalina	CSS	·	2.5 km	MPC · JPL
214669	2006 SZ_{147}	—	September 19, 2006	Kitt Peak	Spacewatch	·	3.6 km	MPC · JPL
214670	2006 SU_{159}	—	September 23, 2006	Kitt Peak	Spacewatch	·	7.3 km	MPC · JPL
214671	2006 SN_{161}	—	September 23, 2006	Kitt Peak	Spacewatch	AST	3.5 km	MPC · JPL
214672	2006 SA_{182}	—	September 25, 2006	Anderson Mesa	LONEOS	·	2.8 km	MPC · JPL
214673	2006 SU_{182}	—	September 25, 2006	Kitt Peak	Spacewatch	AGN	1.4 km	MPC · JPL
214674	2006 SV_{185}	—	September 25, 2006	Mount Lemmon	Mount Lemmon Survey	·	3.9 km	MPC · JPL
214675	2006 SZ_{187}	—	September 26, 2006	Kitt Peak	Spacewatch	(13314)	1.6 km	MPC · JPL
214676	2006 SA_{189}	—	September 26, 2006	Kitt Peak	Spacewatch	AGN	1.7 km	MPC · JPL
214677	2006 SU_{189}	—	September 26, 2006	Mount Lemmon	Mount Lemmon Survey	·	3.1 km	MPC · JPL
214678 Slavėnas	2006 SR_{197}	Slavėnas	September 25, 2006	Moletai	K. Černis, J. Zdanavičius	·	2.8 km	MPC · JPL
214679	2006 SC_{200}	—	September 24, 2006	Kitt Peak	Spacewatch	KOR	1.4 km	MPC · JPL
214680	2006 SK_{204}	—	September 25, 2006	Kitt Peak	Spacewatch	·	2.8 km	MPC · JPL
214681	2006 SQ_{207}	—	September 25, 2006	Kitt Peak	Spacewatch	·	2.6 km	MPC · JPL
214682	2006 SH_{211}	—	September 26, 2006	Catalina	CSS	NAE	5.2 km	MPC · JPL
214683	2006 SA_{212}	—	September 26, 2006	Mount Lemmon	Mount Lemmon Survey	AGN	1.6 km	MPC · JPL
214684	2006 SR_{216}	—	September 27, 2006	Kitt Peak	Spacewatch	·	2.0 km	MPC · JPL
214685	2006 SC_{217}	—	September 28, 2006	Kitt Peak	Spacewatch	·	2.3 km	MPC · JPL
214686	2006 SL_{225}	—	September 26, 2006	Kitt Peak	Spacewatch	·	2.0 km	MPC · JPL
214687	2006 SD_{245}	—	September 26, 2006	Kitt Peak	Spacewatch	·	2.8 km	MPC · JPL
214688	2006 SN_{247}	—	September 26, 2006	Mount Lemmon	Mount Lemmon Survey	·	1.4 km	MPC · JPL
214689	2006 SV_{261}	—	September 26, 2006	Mount Lemmon	Mount Lemmon Survey	AGN	1.7 km	MPC · JPL
214690	2006 SJ_{262}	—	September 26, 2006	Mount Lemmon	Mount Lemmon Survey	·	2.9 km	MPC · JPL
214691	2006 SK_{269}	—	September 26, 2006	Mount Lemmon	Mount Lemmon Survey	·	2.0 km	MPC · JPL
214692	2006 SU_{278}	—	September 28, 2006	Kitt Peak	Spacewatch	·	2.4 km	MPC · JPL
214693	2006 SX_{282}	—	September 25, 2006	Pla D'Arguines	R. Ferrando	·	2.2 km	MPC · JPL
214694	2006 SX_{284}	—	September 29, 2006	Anderson Mesa	LONEOS	·	3.0 km	MPC · JPL
214695	2006 SP_{294}	—	September 25, 2006	Kitt Peak	Spacewatch	·	2.6 km	MPC · JPL
214696	2006 SD_{295}	—	September 25, 2006	Kitt Peak	Spacewatch	·	2.7 km	MPC · JPL
214697	2006 SO_{296}	—	September 25, 2006	Kitt Peak	Spacewatch	·	1.1 km	MPC · JPL
214698	2006 SX_{303}	—	September 27, 2006	Mount Lemmon	Mount Lemmon Survey	·	1.9 km	MPC · JPL
214699	2006 SB_{308}	—	September 27, 2006	Kitt Peak	Spacewatch	URS	3.8 km	MPC · JPL
214700	2006 SE_{336}	—	September 28, 2006	Kitt Peak	Spacewatch	HOF	3.9 km	MPC · JPL

== 214701–214800 ==
back to top

Designation			Discovery			Properties		Ref
Permanent	Provisional	Named after	Date	Site	Discoverer(s)	Category	Diam.	Ref
214701	2006 SM_{338}	—	September 28, 2006	Kitt Peak	Spacewatch	·	3.3 km	MPC · JPL
214702	2006 SK_{339}	—	September 28, 2006	Kitt Peak	Spacewatch	AGN	1.5 km	MPC · JPL
214703	2006 SW_{343}	—	September 28, 2006	Kitt Peak	Spacewatch	·	4.0 km	MPC · JPL
214704	2006 SW_{345}	—	September 28, 2006	Kitt Peak	Spacewatch	·	1.7 km	MPC · JPL
214705	2006 SF_{353}	—	September 30, 2006	Catalina	CSS	·	2.8 km	MPC · JPL
214706	2006 SS_{358}	—	September 30, 2006	Catalina	CSS	·	2.0 km	MPC · JPL
214707	2006 SJ_{383}	—	September 29, 2006	Apache Point	A. C. Becker	LIX	4.1 km	MPC · JPL
214708	2006 ST_{387}	—	September 30, 2006	Apache Point	A. C. Becker	EOS	3.0 km	MPC · JPL
214709	2006 SZ_{389}	—	September 30, 2006	Apache Point	A. C. Becker	ADE	2.5 km	MPC · JPL
214710	2006 SO_{392}	—	September 26, 2006	Catalina	CSS	·	3.6 km	MPC · JPL
214711	2006 SS_{393}	—	September 30, 2006	Catalina	CSS	PHO	1.1 km	MPC · JPL
214712	2006 SW_{394}	—	September 26, 2006	Kitt Peak	Spacewatch	KOR	1.4 km	MPC · JPL
214713	2006 SO_{409}	—	September 20, 2006	Socorro	LINEAR	·	2.3 km	MPC · JPL
214714	2006 TJ	—	October 2, 2006	Mayhill	Lowe, A.	·	2.9 km	MPC · JPL
214715 Silvanofuso	2006 TF_{7}	Silvanofuso	October 10, 2006	San Marcello	L. Tesi, Fagioli, G.	EOS	2.8 km	MPC · JPL
214716	2006 TD_{8}	—	October 13, 2006	Desert Moon	Stevens, B. L.	·	4.4 km	MPC · JPL
214717	2006 TE_{8}	—	October 4, 2006	Mount Lemmon	Mount Lemmon Survey	·	6.4 km	MPC · JPL
214718	2006 TM_{8}	—	October 4, 2006	Mount Lemmon	Mount Lemmon Survey	·	2.0 km	MPC · JPL
214719 Louges	2006 TY_{9}	Louges	October 13, 2006	Dax	Dax	URS	5.1 km	MPC · JPL
214720	2006 TB_{11}	—	October 2, 2006	Kitt Peak	Spacewatch	·	2.9 km	MPC · JPL
214721	2006 TZ_{13}	—	October 10, 2006	Palomar	NEAT	·	3.3 km	MPC · JPL
214722	2006 TO_{15}	—	October 11, 2006	Kitt Peak	Spacewatch	·	2.2 km	MPC · JPL
214723	2006 TY_{16}	—	October 11, 2006	Kitt Peak	Spacewatch	·	3.0 km	MPC · JPL
214724	2006 TH_{17}	—	October 11, 2006	Kitt Peak	Spacewatch	·	3.0 km	MPC · JPL
214725	2006 TE_{18}	—	October 11, 2006	Kitt Peak	Spacewatch	·	3.6 km	MPC · JPL
214726	2006 TP_{19}	—	October 11, 2006	Kitt Peak	Spacewatch	·	2.6 km	MPC · JPL
214727	2006 TS_{19}	—	October 11, 2006	Kitt Peak	Spacewatch	KOR	1.7 km	MPC · JPL
214728	2006 TM_{21}	—	October 11, 2006	Kitt Peak	Spacewatch	·	2.9 km	MPC · JPL
214729	2006 TH_{24}	—	October 12, 2006	Kitt Peak	Spacewatch	·	1.8 km	MPC · JPL
214730	2006 TN_{24}	—	October 12, 2006	Kitt Peak	Spacewatch	·	3.6 km	MPC · JPL
214731	2006 TG_{25}	—	October 12, 2006	Kitt Peak	Spacewatch	EOS	2.7 km	MPC · JPL
214732	2006 TM_{30}	—	October 12, 2006	Kitt Peak	Spacewatch	HYG	3.2 km	MPC · JPL
214733	2006 TB_{31}	—	October 12, 2006	Kitt Peak	Spacewatch	·	5.1 km	MPC · JPL
214734	2006 TA_{33}	—	October 12, 2006	Kitt Peak	Spacewatch	·	2.2 km	MPC · JPL
214735	2006 TU_{37}	—	October 12, 2006	Kitt Peak	Spacewatch	·	2.3 km	MPC · JPL
214736	2006 TY_{38}	—	October 12, 2006	Kitt Peak	Spacewatch	·	1.8 km	MPC · JPL
214737	2006 TK_{39}	—	October 12, 2006	Kitt Peak	Spacewatch	·	2.0 km	MPC · JPL
214738	2006 TB_{41}	—	October 12, 2006	Kitt Peak	Spacewatch	·	2.7 km	MPC · JPL
214739	2006 TQ_{42}	—	October 12, 2006	Kitt Peak	Spacewatch	·	2.6 km	MPC · JPL
214740	2006 TT_{43}	—	October 12, 2006	Kitt Peak	Spacewatch	·	3.1 km	MPC · JPL
214741	2006 TH_{46}	—	October 12, 2006	Kitt Peak	Spacewatch	·	2.8 km	MPC · JPL
214742	2006 TL_{51}	—	October 12, 2006	Kitt Peak	Spacewatch	EOS	2.2 km	MPC · JPL
214743	2006 TP_{51}	—	October 12, 2006	Kitt Peak	Spacewatch	·	4.6 km	MPC · JPL
214744	2006 TQ_{51}	—	October 12, 2006	Kitt Peak	Spacewatch	·	2.1 km	MPC · JPL
214745	2006 TA_{55}	—	October 12, 2006	Palomar	NEAT	·	2.4 km	MPC · JPL
214746	2006 TY_{56}	—	October 14, 2006	Lulin	Lin, C.-S., Q. Ye	·	3.3 km	MPC · JPL
214747	2006 TU_{57}	—	October 15, 2006	Catalina	CSS	·	1.9 km	MPC · JPL
214748	2006 TR_{59}	—	October 13, 2006	Kitt Peak	Spacewatch	HYG	3.8 km	MPC · JPL
214749	2006 TO_{60}	—	October 13, 2006	Kitt Peak	Spacewatch	·	2.8 km	MPC · JPL
214750	2006 TS_{67}	—	October 11, 2006	Kitt Peak	Spacewatch	·	5.2 km	MPC · JPL
214751	2006 TJ_{71}	—	October 11, 2006	Palomar	NEAT	EOS	2.8 km	MPC · JPL
214752	2006 TR_{71}	—	October 11, 2006	Palomar	NEAT	·	2.8 km	MPC · JPL
214753	2006 TD_{75}	—	October 11, 2006	Palomar	NEAT	·	1.3 km	MPC · JPL
214754	2006 TC_{77}	—	October 11, 2006	Palomar	NEAT	·	2.5 km	MPC · JPL
214755	2006 TJ_{78}	—	October 12, 2006	Palomar	NEAT	VER	3.8 km	MPC · JPL
214756	2006 TW_{79}	—	October 13, 2006	Kitt Peak	Spacewatch	EOS	2.7 km	MPC · JPL
214757	2006 TD_{89}	—	October 13, 2006	Kitt Peak	Spacewatch	·	4.0 km	MPC · JPL
214758	2006 TY_{93}	—	October 15, 2006	Kitt Peak	Spacewatch	·	4.3 km	MPC · JPL
214759	2006 TH_{95}	—	October 13, 2006	Lulin	Lin, C.-S., Q. Ye	EOS	2.4 km	MPC · JPL
214760	2006 TM_{103}	—	October 15, 2006	Kitt Peak	Spacewatch	AGN	1.3 km	MPC · JPL
214761	2006 TN_{103}	—	October 15, 2006	Kitt Peak	Spacewatch	·	3.6 km	MPC · JPL
214762	2006 TU_{108}	—	October 11, 2006	Apache Point	A. C. Becker	GEF	1.6 km	MPC · JPL
214763	2006 TZ_{109}	—	October 12, 2006	Kitt Peak	Spacewatch	·	2.8 km	MPC · JPL
214764	2006 TN_{120}	—	October 12, 2006	Apache Point	A. C. Becker	·	4.3 km	MPC · JPL
214765	2006 UG_{6}	—	October 16, 2006	Catalina	CSS	·	2.3 km	MPC · JPL
214766	2006 UT_{7}	—	October 16, 2006	Catalina	CSS	·	1.9 km	MPC · JPL
214767	2006 UO_{9}	—	October 16, 2006	Kitt Peak	Spacewatch	·	4.2 km	MPC · JPL
214768	2006 UQ_{10}	—	October 17, 2006	Mount Lemmon	Mount Lemmon Survey	MRX	2.1 km	MPC · JPL
214769	2006 UA_{47}	—	October 16, 2006	Kitt Peak	Spacewatch	·	3.2 km	MPC · JPL
214770	2006 UP_{59}	—	October 19, 2006	Catalina	CSS	·	4.5 km	MPC · JPL
214771	2006 UR_{62}	—	October 20, 2006	Kitt Peak	Spacewatch	·	3.4 km	MPC · JPL
214772 UNICEF	2006 UO_{64}	UNICEF	October 23, 2006	Vallemare Borbona	V. S. Casulli	·	3.4 km	MPC · JPL
214773	2006 UU_{64}	—	October 22, 2006	Goodricke-Pigott	R. A. Tucker	(18466)	2.9 km	MPC · JPL
214774	2006 UC_{67}	—	October 16, 2006	Catalina	CSS	·	2.9 km	MPC · JPL
214775	2006 UL_{71}	—	October 16, 2006	Bergisch Gladbach	W. Bickel	·	2.4 km	MPC · JPL
214776	2006 UD_{75}	—	October 17, 2006	Catalina	CSS	·	2.6 km	MPC · JPL
214777	2006 UQ_{75}	—	October 17, 2006	Mount Lemmon	Mount Lemmon Survey	·	2.5 km	MPC · JPL
214778	2006 UX_{79}	—	October 17, 2006	Mount Lemmon	Mount Lemmon Survey	·	2.0 km	MPC · JPL
214779	2006 UB_{80}	—	October 17, 2006	Mount Lemmon	Mount Lemmon Survey	·	2.3 km	MPC · JPL
214780	2006 UD_{80}	—	October 17, 2006	Mount Lemmon	Mount Lemmon Survey	KOR	2.1 km	MPC · JPL
214781	2006 UB_{85}	—	October 17, 2006	Mount Lemmon	Mount Lemmon Survey	·	4.8 km	MPC · JPL
214782	2006 UR_{90}	—	October 17, 2006	Kitt Peak	Spacewatch	·	4.9 km	MPC · JPL
214783	2006 UR_{92}	—	October 18, 2006	Kitt Peak	Spacewatch	·	3.2 km	MPC · JPL
214784	2006 UG_{105}	—	October 18, 2006	Kitt Peak	Spacewatch	V	780 m	MPC · JPL
214785	2006 UZ_{116}	—	October 19, 2006	Kitt Peak	Spacewatch	·	3.3 km	MPC · JPL
214786	2006 US_{132}	—	October 19, 2006	Kitt Peak	Spacewatch	·	3.4 km	MPC · JPL
214787	2006 UE_{135}	—	October 19, 2006	Kitt Peak	Spacewatch	·	3.6 km	MPC · JPL
214788	2006 UC_{136}	—	October 19, 2006	Kitt Peak	Spacewatch	·	1.9 km	MPC · JPL
214789	2006 US_{137}	—	October 19, 2006	Mount Lemmon	Mount Lemmon Survey	·	1.2 km	MPC · JPL
214790	2006 UR_{162}	—	October 21, 2006	Mount Lemmon	Mount Lemmon Survey	KOR	1.7 km	MPC · JPL
214791	2006 UZ_{174}	—	October 16, 2006	Catalina	CSS	·	2.5 km	MPC · JPL
214792	2006 UT_{175}	—	October 16, 2006	Catalina	CSS	·	4.0 km	MPC · JPL
214793	2006 UX_{175}	—	October 16, 2006	Catalina	CSS	·	4.5 km	MPC · JPL
214794	2006 UA_{178}	—	October 16, 2006	Catalina	CSS	·	4.6 km	MPC · JPL
214795	2006 UF_{180}	—	October 16, 2006	Catalina	CSS	·	1.8 km	MPC · JPL
214796	2006 UT_{180}	—	October 16, 2006	Catalina	CSS	·	2.5 km	MPC · JPL
214797	2006 UB_{182}	—	October 16, 2006	Catalina	CSS	·	2.5 km	MPC · JPL
214798	2006 US_{188}	—	October 19, 2006	Catalina	CSS	TIR	5.6 km	MPC · JPL
214799	2006 UU_{197}	—	October 20, 2006	Kitt Peak	Spacewatch	·	3.1 km	MPC · JPL
214800	2006 UO_{202}	—	October 22, 2006	Catalina	CSS	WIT	1.4 km	MPC · JPL

== 214801–214900 ==
back to top

Designation			Discovery			Properties		Ref
Permanent	Provisional	Named after	Date	Site	Discoverer(s)	Category	Diam.	Ref
214801	2006 UD_{203}	—	October 22, 2006	Palomar	NEAT	EUN	2.2 km	MPC · JPL
214802	2006 UT_{204}	—	October 22, 2006	Palomar	NEAT	EOS	3.0 km	MPC · JPL
214803	2006 UK_{209}	—	October 23, 2006	Kitt Peak	Spacewatch	·	2.2 km	MPC · JPL
214804	2006 UP_{210}	—	October 23, 2006	Kitt Peak	Spacewatch	EOS	2.5 km	MPC · JPL
214805	2006 UJ_{220}	—	October 16, 2006	Catalina	CSS	·	7.3 km	MPC · JPL
214806	2006 UO_{221}	—	October 17, 2006	Mount Lemmon	Mount Lemmon Survey	·	2.6 km	MPC · JPL
214807	2006 UE_{226}	—	October 20, 2006	Kitt Peak	Spacewatch	EOS	2.6 km	MPC · JPL
214808	2006 UX_{226}	—	October 20, 2006	Mount Lemmon	Mount Lemmon Survey	·	2.0 km	MPC · JPL
214809	2006 UP_{228}	—	October 20, 2006	Palomar	NEAT	·	2.6 km	MPC · JPL
214810	2006 UF_{230}	—	October 21, 2006	Palomar	NEAT	·	2.9 km	MPC · JPL
214811	2006 UV_{233}	—	October 22, 2006	Mount Lemmon	Mount Lemmon Survey	·	2.0 km	MPC · JPL
214812	2006 UJ_{242}	—	October 27, 2006	Kitt Peak	Spacewatch	·	3.0 km	MPC · JPL
214813	2006 UO_{260}	—	October 28, 2006	Mount Lemmon	Mount Lemmon Survey	·	3.0 km	MPC · JPL
214814	2006 UE_{263}	—	October 28, 2006	Mount Lemmon	Mount Lemmon Survey	EOS	2.7 km	MPC · JPL
214815	2006 UX_{281}	—	October 28, 2006	Mount Lemmon	Mount Lemmon Survey	·	2.5 km	MPC · JPL
214816	2006 UG_{287}	—	October 29, 2006	Kitt Peak	Spacewatch	·	2.5 km	MPC · JPL
214817	2006 UF_{328}	—	October 17, 2006	Catalina	CSS	·	3.0 km	MPC · JPL
214818	2006 UC_{332}	—	October 21, 2006	Apache Point	A. C. Becker	·	2.6 km	MPC · JPL
214819 Gianotti	2006 VK_{2}	Gianotti	November 10, 2006	Vallemare Borbona	V. S. Casulli	·	4.2 km	MPC · JPL
214820 Faustocoppi	2006 VC_{14}	Faustocoppi	November 14, 2006	Vallemare Borbona	V. S. Casulli	·	2.7 km	MPC · JPL
214821	2006 VJ_{16}	—	November 9, 2006	Kitt Peak	Spacewatch	EOS	2.6 km	MPC · JPL
214822	2006 VN_{19}	—	November 9, 2006	Kitt Peak	Spacewatch	·	3.3 km	MPC · JPL
214823	2006 VU_{25}	—	November 10, 2006	Kitt Peak	Spacewatch	·	3.4 km	MPC · JPL
214824	2006 VD_{32}	—	November 11, 2006	Mount Lemmon	Mount Lemmon Survey	·	3.0 km	MPC · JPL
214825	2006 VS_{41}	—	November 12, 2006	Mount Lemmon	Mount Lemmon Survey	·	3.8 km	MPC · JPL
214826	2006 VQ_{51}	—	November 10, 2006	Kitt Peak	Spacewatch	·	3.0 km	MPC · JPL
214827	2006 VO_{71}	—	November 11, 2006	Mount Lemmon	Mount Lemmon Survey	·	1.8 km	MPC · JPL
214828	2006 VE_{73}	—	November 11, 2006	Kitt Peak	Spacewatch	·	4.6 km	MPC · JPL
214829	2006 VF_{80}	—	November 12, 2006	Mount Lemmon	Mount Lemmon Survey	HYG	4.7 km	MPC · JPL
214830	2006 VG_{80}	—	November 12, 2006	Mount Lemmon	Mount Lemmon Survey	·	5.0 km	MPC · JPL
214831	2006 VX_{92}	—	November 15, 2006	Mount Lemmon	Mount Lemmon Survey	·	940 m	MPC · JPL
214832	2006 VC_{93}	—	November 15, 2006	Mount Lemmon	Mount Lemmon Survey	·	4.6 km	MPC · JPL
214833	2006 VT_{106}	—	November 13, 2006	Catalina	CSS	VER	4.1 km	MPC · JPL
214834	2006 VQ_{109}	—	November 13, 2006	Catalina	CSS	EOS	2.7 km	MPC · JPL
214835	2006 VO_{119}	—	November 14, 2006	Kitt Peak	Spacewatch	KOR	1.7 km	MPC · JPL
214836	2006 VY_{126}	—	November 15, 2006	Kitt Peak	Spacewatch	·	2.3 km	MPC · JPL
214837	2006 VV_{128}	—	November 15, 2006	Kitt Peak	Spacewatch	·	5.4 km	MPC · JPL
214838	2006 VV_{134}	—	November 15, 2006	Mount Lemmon	Mount Lemmon Survey	KOR	1.7 km	MPC · JPL
214839	2006 VW_{141}	—	November 13, 2006	Mount Lemmon	Mount Lemmon Survey	DOR	3.3 km	MPC · JPL
214840	2006 VB_{144}	—	November 15, 2006	Catalina	CSS	·	5.6 km	MPC · JPL
214841	2006 VQ_{147}	—	November 15, 2006	Catalina	CSS	·	5.5 km	MPC · JPL
214842	2006 VG_{150}	—	November 9, 2006	Palomar	NEAT	·	3.7 km	MPC · JPL
214843	2006 VO_{170}	—	November 11, 2006	Kitt Peak	Spacewatch	THM	3.7 km	MPC · JPL
214844	2006 WM_{45}	—	November 16, 2006	Mount Lemmon	Mount Lemmon Survey	HOF	3.6 km	MPC · JPL
214845	2006 WQ_{67}	—	November 17, 2006	Mount Lemmon	Mount Lemmon Survey	ANF	1.7 km	MPC · JPL
214846	2006 WO_{74}	—	November 18, 2006	Kitt Peak	Spacewatch	HYG	3.8 km	MPC · JPL
214847	2006 WN_{92}	—	November 19, 2006	Kitt Peak	Spacewatch	·	1.7 km	MPC · JPL
214848	2006 WS_{94}	—	November 19, 2006	Kitt Peak	Spacewatch	·	2.9 km	MPC · JPL
214849	2006 WY_{95}	—	November 19, 2006	Kitt Peak	Spacewatch	·	2.0 km	MPC · JPL
214850	2006 WB_{96}	—	November 19, 2006	Socorro	LINEAR	·	970 m	MPC · JPL
214851	2006 WU_{101}	—	November 19, 2006	Catalina	CSS	MRX	1.3 km	MPC · JPL
214852	2006 WU_{102}	—	November 19, 2006	Kitt Peak	Spacewatch	HYG	3.3 km	MPC · JPL
214853	2006 WL_{106}	—	November 19, 2006	Kitt Peak	Spacewatch	·	3.6 km	MPC · JPL
214854	2006 WF_{185}	—	November 29, 2006	Desert Moon	Stevens, B. L.	·	3.5 km	MPC · JPL
214855	2006 WF_{203}	—	November 16, 2006	Kitt Peak	Spacewatch	·	5.6 km	MPC · JPL
214856	2006 XM_{39}	—	December 12, 2006	Kitt Peak	Spacewatch	·	3.8 km	MPC · JPL
214857	2006 XY_{58}	—	December 14, 2006	Kitt Peak	Spacewatch	·	1.3 km	MPC · JPL
214858	2006 XR_{63}	—	December 9, 2006	Palomar	NEAT	·	3.1 km	MPC · JPL
214859	2006 YN_{7}	—	December 20, 2006	Palomar	NEAT	·	1.9 km	MPC · JPL
214860	2006 YG_{12}	—	December 20, 2006	Mount Nyukasa	Japan Aerospace Exploration Agency	·	4.2 km	MPC · JPL
214861	2006 YL_{22}	—	December 21, 2006	Kitt Peak	Spacewatch	·	3.8 km	MPC · JPL
214862	2006 YL_{39}	—	December 22, 2006	Kitt Peak	Spacewatch	·	4.1 km	MPC · JPL
214863 Seiradakis	2006 YB_{55}	Seiradakis	December 27, 2006	Mount Lemmon	Mount Lemmon Survey	HOF	2.9 km	MPC · JPL
214864	2007 EF_{1}	—	March 6, 2007	Palomar	NEAT	V	950 m	MPC · JPL
214865	2007 EW_{56}	—	March 14, 2007	Mount Lemmon	Mount Lemmon Survey	H	660 m	MPC · JPL
214866	2007 EZ_{124}	—	March 14, 2007	Catalina	CSS	·	4.7 km	MPC · JPL
214867	2007 HN_{17}	—	April 16, 2007	Catalina	CSS	·	4.0 km	MPC · JPL
214868	2007 PF_{7}	—	August 5, 2007	Socorro	LINEAR	·	840 m	MPC · JPL
214869	2007 PA_{8}	—	August 9, 2007	Socorro	LINEAR	T_{j} (2.95) · APO +1km · PHA · slow	1.8 km	MPC · JPL
214870	2007 PE_{17}	—	August 8, 2007	Socorro	LINEAR	·	1.2 km	MPC · JPL
214871	2007 PH_{35}	—	August 9, 2007	Socorro	LINEAR	·	2.1 km	MPC · JPL
214872	2007 QV_{6}	—	August 21, 2007	Anderson Mesa	LONEOS	·	960 m	MPC · JPL
214873	2007 RM_{18}	—	September 2, 2007	Mount Lemmon	Mount Lemmon Survey	H	710 m	MPC · JPL
214874	2007 RP_{42}	—	September 9, 2007	Anderson Mesa	LONEOS	·	7.1 km	MPC · JPL
214875	2007 RG_{95}	—	September 10, 2007	Kitt Peak	Spacewatch	·	1.5 km	MPC · JPL
214876	2007 RH_{105}	—	September 11, 2007	Catalina	CSS	MAS	930 m	MPC · JPL
214877	2007 RY_{110}	—	September 11, 2007	Mount Lemmon	Mount Lemmon Survey	·	1 km	MPC · JPL
214878	2007 RM_{142}	—	September 13, 2007	Socorro	LINEAR	·	1.8 km	MPC · JPL
214879	2007 RB_{149}	—	September 12, 2007	Catalina	CSS	H	720 m	MPC · JPL
214880	2007 RP_{157}	—	September 11, 2007	XuYi	PMO NEO Survey Program	·	1 km	MPC · JPL
214881	2007 RT_{178}	—	September 10, 2007	Kitt Peak	Spacewatch	·	950 m	MPC · JPL
214882	2007 RC_{218}	—	September 13, 2007	Mount Lemmon	Mount Lemmon Survey	V	910 m	MPC · JPL
214883 Yuanxikun	2007 RL_{232}	Yuanxikun	September 11, 2007	XuYi	PMO NEO Survey Program	·	1.9 km	MPC · JPL
214884	2007 RE_{244}	—	September 15, 2007	Socorro	LINEAR	PHO	1.6 km	MPC · JPL
214885	2007 RB_{265}	—	September 15, 2007	Mount Lemmon	Mount Lemmon Survey	·	1.6 km	MPC · JPL
214886	2007 RC_{269}	—	September 15, 2007	Mount Lemmon	Mount Lemmon Survey	·	1 km	MPC · JPL
214887	2007 RT_{270}	—	September 15, 2007	Mount Lemmon	Mount Lemmon Survey	THM	2.9 km	MPC · JPL
214888	2007 RT_{271}	—	September 15, 2007	Mount Lemmon	Mount Lemmon Survey	·	1.6 km	MPC · JPL
214889	2007 RM_{284}	—	September 11, 2007	Mount Lemmon	Mount Lemmon Survey	·	1.8 km	MPC · JPL
214890	2007 RG_{291}	—	September 14, 2007	Mount Lemmon	Mount Lemmon Survey	NYS	1.6 km	MPC · JPL
214891	2007 RV_{300}	—	September 12, 2007	Mount Lemmon	Mount Lemmon Survey	V	790 m	MPC · JPL
214892	2007 SU_{2}	—	September 20, 2007	Catalina	CSS	H	850 m	MPC · JPL
214893	2007 SJ_{7}	—	September 18, 2007	Kitt Peak	Spacewatch	·	1.1 km	MPC · JPL
214894	2007 TF_{16}	—	October 6, 2007	Kitt Peak	Spacewatch	·	2.0 km	MPC · JPL
214895	2007 TD_{22}	—	October 8, 2007	Goodricke-Pigott	R. A. Tucker	·	2.8 km	MPC · JPL
214896	2007 TZ_{28}	—	October 4, 2007	Kitt Peak	Spacewatch	·	1.6 km	MPC · JPL
214897	2007 TN_{43}	—	October 7, 2007	Mount Lemmon	Mount Lemmon Survey	·	1.0 km	MPC · JPL
214898	2007 TD_{58}	—	October 4, 2007	Kitt Peak	Spacewatch	·	1.3 km	MPC · JPL
214899	2007 TM_{81}	—	October 7, 2007	Catalina	CSS	·	1.1 km	MPC · JPL
214900	2007 TP_{88}	—	October 8, 2007	Kitt Peak	Spacewatch	·	2.1 km	MPC · JPL

== 214901–215000 ==
back to top

Designation			Discovery			Properties		Ref
Permanent	Provisional	Named after	Date	Site	Discoverer(s)	Category	Diam.	Ref
214901	2007 TQ_{95}	—	October 7, 2007	Catalina	CSS	(5)	3.4 km	MPC · JPL
214902	2007 TM_{135}	—	October 8, 2007	Kitt Peak	Spacewatch	·	1.2 km	MPC · JPL
214903	2007 TE_{136}	—	October 8, 2007	Kitt Peak	Spacewatch	·	1.2 km	MPC · JPL
214904	2007 TB_{143}	—	October 15, 2007	Dauban	Chante-Perdrix	·	1.6 km	MPC · JPL
214905	2007 TV_{144}	—	October 6, 2007	Socorro	LINEAR	·	1.8 km	MPC · JPL
214906	2007 TU_{147}	—	October 7, 2007	Socorro	LINEAR	·	4.9 km	MPC · JPL
214907	2007 TU_{160}	—	October 9, 2007	Socorro	LINEAR	·	2.3 km	MPC · JPL
214908	2007 TS_{163}	—	October 11, 2007	Socorro	LINEAR	MAS	1.0 km	MPC · JPL
214909	2007 TD_{180}	—	October 7, 2007	Mount Lemmon	Mount Lemmon Survey	·	1.1 km	MPC · JPL
214910	2007 TP_{181}	—	October 8, 2007	Anderson Mesa	LONEOS	T_{j} (2.95) · HIL	5.3 km	MPC · JPL
214911 Viehböck	2007 TM_{184}	Viehböck	October 11, 2007	Gaisberg	Gierlinger, R.	·	1.3 km	MPC · JPL
214912	2007 TX_{233}	—	October 8, 2007	Kitt Peak	Spacewatch	·	2.2 km	MPC · JPL
214913	2007 TL_{240}	—	October 14, 2007	Socorro	LINEAR	·	2.0 km	MPC · JPL
214914	2007 TQ_{241}	—	October 7, 2007	Mount Lemmon	Mount Lemmon Survey	·	670 m	MPC · JPL
214915	2007 TH_{257}	—	October 10, 2007	Kitt Peak	Spacewatch	·	1.1 km	MPC · JPL
214916	2007 TN_{257}	—	October 10, 2007	Kitt Peak	Spacewatch	·	1.2 km	MPC · JPL
214917	2007 TY_{266}	—	October 9, 2007	Kitt Peak	Spacewatch	ANF	2.0 km	MPC · JPL
214918	2007 TD_{338}	—	October 13, 2007	Catalina	CSS	·	1.5 km	MPC · JPL
214919	2007 TG_{363}	—	October 14, 2007	Mount Lemmon	Mount Lemmon Survey	·	930 m	MPC · JPL
214920	2007 UB_{18}	—	October 16, 2007	Kitt Peak	Spacewatch	·	1.8 km	MPC · JPL
214921	2007 UY_{25}	—	October 16, 2007	Kitt Peak	Spacewatch	·	1.4 km	MPC · JPL
214922	2007 UJ_{43}	—	October 18, 2007	Kitt Peak	Spacewatch	·	2.0 km	MPC · JPL
214923	2007 UK_{50}	—	October 24, 2007	Mount Lemmon	Mount Lemmon Survey	·	2.0 km	MPC · JPL
214924	2007 UZ_{51}	—	October 24, 2007	Mount Lemmon	Mount Lemmon Survey	·	1.7 km	MPC · JPL
214925	2007 UL_{85}	—	October 30, 2007	Kitt Peak	Spacewatch	·	1.0 km	MPC · JPL
214926	2007 UJ_{98}	—	October 30, 2007	Kitt Peak	Spacewatch	·	980 m	MPC · JPL
214927	2007 UJ_{111}	—	October 30, 2007	Mount Lemmon	Mount Lemmon Survey	NYS	1.1 km	MPC · JPL
214928 Carrara	2007 VM_{8}	Carrara	November 5, 2007	Vallemare Borbona	V. S. Casulli	·	1.2 km	MPC · JPL
214929	2007 VF_{27}	—	November 1, 2007	Kitt Peak	Spacewatch	·	2.0 km	MPC · JPL
214930	2007 VU_{44}	—	November 1, 2007	Kitt Peak	Spacewatch	·	1.6 km	MPC · JPL
214931	2007 VT_{61}	—	November 1, 2007	Kitt Peak	Spacewatch	·	1.2 km	MPC · JPL
214932	2007 VX_{163}	—	November 5, 2007	Kitt Peak	Spacewatch	·	2.0 km	MPC · JPL
214933	2007 VW_{164}	—	November 5, 2007	Kitt Peak	Spacewatch	·	1.5 km	MPC · JPL
214934	2007 VT_{165}	—	November 5, 2007	Kitt Peak	Spacewatch	·	830 m	MPC · JPL
214935	2007 VJ_{167}	—	November 5, 2007	Mount Lemmon	Mount Lemmon Survey	(5)	1.7 km	MPC · JPL
214936	2007 VN_{193}	—	November 4, 2007	Mount Lemmon	Mount Lemmon Survey	HOF	4.2 km	MPC · JPL
214937	2007 VG_{213}	—	November 9, 2007	Kitt Peak	Spacewatch	·	2.2 km	MPC · JPL
214938	2007 VN_{220}	—	November 9, 2007	Kitt Peak	Spacewatch	·	1.7 km	MPC · JPL
214939	2007 VT_{244}	—	November 15, 2007	Marly	P. Kocher	·	970 m	MPC · JPL
214940	2007 VK_{251}	—	November 9, 2007	Catalina	CSS	·	2.4 km	MPC · JPL
214941	2007 VO_{253}	—	November 14, 2007	Anderson Mesa	LONEOS	·	1.3 km	MPC · JPL
214942	2007 VE_{256}	—	November 13, 2007	Mount Lemmon	Mount Lemmon Survey	·	1.3 km	MPC · JPL
214943	2007 VC_{263}	—	November 13, 2007	Kitt Peak	Spacewatch	·	1.2 km	MPC · JPL
214944	2007 VQ_{270}	—	November 8, 2007	Catalina	CSS	·	2.4 km	MPC · JPL
214945	2007 VP_{275}	—	November 13, 2007	Kitt Peak	Spacewatch	·	2.5 km	MPC · JPL
214946	2007 VX_{283}	—	November 14, 2007	Kitt Peak	Spacewatch	NYS	1.6 km	MPC · JPL
214947	2007 VA_{309}	—	November 9, 2007	Catalina	CSS	·	1.8 km	MPC · JPL
214948	2007 VX_{311}	—	November 12, 2007	Mount Lemmon	Mount Lemmon Survey	·	1.8 km	MPC · JPL
214949	2007 VO_{312}	—	November 2, 2007	Mount Lemmon	Mount Lemmon Survey	·	2.1 km	MPC · JPL
214950	2007 WU_{20}	—	November 18, 2007	Mount Lemmon	Mount Lemmon Survey	·	2.9 km	MPC · JPL
214951	2007 WX_{34}	—	November 19, 2007	Mount Lemmon	Mount Lemmon Survey	MAR	1.5 km	MPC · JPL
214952	2007 WO_{42}	—	November 18, 2007	Mount Lemmon	Mount Lemmon Survey	·	1.0 km	MPC · JPL
214953 Giugavazzi	2007 WN_{55}	Giugavazzi	November 29, 2007	San Marcello	L. Tesi, Fagioli, G.	V	990 m	MPC · JPL
214954	2007 WO_{58}	—	November 17, 2007	Kitt Peak	Spacewatch	·	1.6 km	MPC · JPL
214955	2007 XK_{14}	—	December 5, 2007	Mount Lemmon	Mount Lemmon Survey	·	1.8 km	MPC · JPL
214956	2007 XL_{25}	—	December 15, 2007	La Sagra	OAM	HOF	3.3 km	MPC · JPL
214957	2007 XT_{29}	—	December 15, 2007	Catalina	CSS	·	1.8 km	MPC · JPL
214958	2007 XE_{34}	—	December 12, 2007	Socorro	LINEAR	·	1.6 km	MPC · JPL
214959	2007 XS_{37}	—	December 13, 2007	Socorro	LINEAR	·	4.8 km	MPC · JPL
214960	2007 XX_{42}	—	December 15, 2007	Kitt Peak	Spacewatch	KOR	1.4 km	MPC · JPL
214961	2007 XD_{53}	—	December 6, 2007	Mount Lemmon	Mount Lemmon Survey	·	4.3 km	MPC · JPL
214962	2007 YE_{11}	—	December 17, 2007	Kitt Peak	Spacewatch	·	5.0 km	MPC · JPL
214963	2007 YD_{39}	—	December 30, 2007	Mount Lemmon	Mount Lemmon Survey	EUN	1.8 km	MPC · JPL
214964	2007 YX_{46}	—	December 30, 2007	Mount Lemmon	Mount Lemmon Survey	·	2.8 km	MPC · JPL
214965	2007 YN_{58}	—	December 30, 2007	Kitt Peak	Spacewatch	·	5.1 km	MPC · JPL
214966	2007 YE_{61}	—	December 31, 2007	Catalina	CSS	·	3.1 km	MPC · JPL
214967	2007 YD_{62}	—	December 18, 2007	Mount Lemmon	Mount Lemmon Survey	·	3.4 km	MPC · JPL
214968	2007 YD_{68}	—	December 30, 2007	Catalina	CSS	·	3.0 km	MPC · JPL
214969	2007 YE_{68}	—	December 30, 2007	Mount Lemmon	Mount Lemmon Survey	(5)	1.4 km	MPC · JPL
214970	2008 AT	—	January 1, 2008	Schiaparelli	Schiaparelli	URS	5.4 km	MPC · JPL
214971	2008 AW_{4}	—	January 7, 2008	Lulin	LUSS	·	3.0 km	MPC · JPL
214972	2008 AY_{11}	—	January 10, 2008	Mount Lemmon	Mount Lemmon Survey	·	4.0 km	MPC · JPL
214973	2008 AZ_{15}	—	January 10, 2008	Mount Lemmon	Mount Lemmon Survey	·	3.2 km	MPC · JPL
214974	2008 AX_{56}	—	January 11, 2008	Kitt Peak	Spacewatch	HOF	4.1 km	MPC · JPL
214975	2008 AL_{59}	—	January 11, 2008	Kitt Peak	Spacewatch	KOR	1.5 km	MPC · JPL
214976	2008 AF_{66}	—	January 11, 2008	Kitt Peak	Spacewatch	·	3.1 km	MPC · JPL
214977	2008 AD_{68}	—	January 11, 2008	Kitt Peak	Spacewatch	·	2.6 km	MPC · JPL
214978	2008 AG_{68}	—	January 11, 2008	Kitt Peak	Spacewatch	·	3.7 km	MPC · JPL
214979	2008 AM_{70}	—	January 12, 2008	Mount Lemmon	Mount Lemmon Survey	·	2.0 km	MPC · JPL
214980	2008 AL_{72}	—	January 14, 2008	Kitt Peak	Spacewatch	·	4.3 km	MPC · JPL
214981	2008 AP_{72}	—	January 14, 2008	Kitt Peak	Spacewatch	·	5.4 km	MPC · JPL
214982	2008 AC_{77}	—	January 12, 2008	Kitt Peak	Spacewatch	AGN	1.9 km	MPC · JPL
214983	2008 AG_{80}	—	January 12, 2008	Kitt Peak	Spacewatch	·	2.2 km	MPC · JPL
214984	2008 AB_{81}	—	January 12, 2008	Kitt Peak	Spacewatch	EOS	2.1 km	MPC · JPL
214985	2008 AP_{110}	—	January 15, 2008	Kitt Peak	Spacewatch	EOS	3.3 km	MPC · JPL
214986	2008 AY_{114}	—	January 11, 2008	Mount Lemmon	Mount Lemmon Survey	·	2.4 km	MPC · JPL
214987	2008 AO_{117}	—	January 11, 2008	Kitt Peak	Spacewatch	THM	3.7 km	MPC · JPL
214988	2008 BH_{14}	—	January 20, 2008	Mount Lemmon	Mount Lemmon Survey	EOS	2.3 km	MPC · JPL
214989	2008 BP_{18}	—	January 30, 2008	La Sagra	OAM	·	4.2 km	MPC · JPL
214990	2008 BB_{42}	—	January 31, 2008	Catalina	CSS	·	3.2 km	MPC · JPL
214991	2008 CM_{21}	—	February 7, 2008	Altschwendt	W. Ries	·	2.1 km	MPC · JPL
214992	2008 CJ_{23}	—	February 1, 2008	Kitt Peak	Spacewatch	·	4.4 km	MPC · JPL
214993	2008 CM_{28}	—	February 2, 2008	Kitt Peak	Spacewatch	·	4.0 km	MPC · JPL
214994	2008 CR_{38}	—	February 2, 2008	Mount Lemmon	Mount Lemmon Survey	EOS	2.5 km	MPC · JPL
214995	2008 CS_{45}	—	February 2, 2008	Catalina	CSS	·	5.2 km	MPC · JPL
214996	2008 CU_{45}	—	February 2, 2008	Catalina	CSS	·	4.3 km	MPC · JPL
214997	2008 CK_{47}	—	February 3, 2008	Catalina	CSS	·	4.2 km	MPC · JPL
214998	2008 CT_{77}	—	February 6, 2008	Catalina	CSS	·	2.7 km	MPC · JPL
214999	2008 CY_{129}	—	February 8, 2008	Kitt Peak	Spacewatch	·	2.5 km	MPC · JPL
215000	2008 CQ_{137}	—	February 8, 2008	Kitt Peak	Spacewatch	·	3.5 km	MPC · JPL

back to top

== See also ==
- Meanings of minor-planet names: 214001–215000
