= Meanings of minor-planet names: 214001–215000 =

As minor planet discoveries are confirmed, they are given a permanent number by the IAU's Minor Planet Center (MPC), and the discoverers can then submit names for them, following the IAU's naming conventions. The list below concerns those minor planets in the specified number-range that have received names, and explains the meanings of those names.

Official naming citations of newly named small Solar System bodies are approved and published in a bulletin by IAU's Working Group for Small Bodies Nomenclature (WGSBN). Before May 2021, citations were published in MPC's Minor Planet Circulars for many decades. Recent citations can also be found on the JPL Small-Body Database (SBDB). Until his death in 2016, German astronomer Lutz D. Schmadel compiled these citations into the Dictionary of Minor Planet Names (DMP) and regularly updated the collection.

Based on Paul Herget's The Names of the Minor Planets, Schmadel also researched the unclear origin of numerous asteroids, most of which had been named prior to World War II. This article incorporates text from this source, which is in the public domain: SBDB New namings may only be added to this list below after official publication as the preannouncement of names is condemned. The WGSBN publishes a comprehensive guideline for the naming rules of non-cometary small Solar System bodies.

== 214001–214100 ==
Named minor planet	Provisional	This minor planet was named for...	Ref · Catalog
214081 Balavoine	2004 HL_{31}	Daniel Balavoine (1952–1986), French singer and songwriter.	JPL · 214081

== 214101–214200 ==
back to top

Named minor planet	Provisional	This minor planet was named for...	Ref · Catalog
214136 Alinghi	2005 AQ_{27}	Alinghi, the name of several Swiss yachts, operated by the Société Nautique de Genève. The crew won several races including the America's Cup in 2003.	JPL · 214136
214180 Mabaglioni	2005 CO_{77}	Maurizio Baglioni (born 1947) graduated in electrical engineering from the University of Rome "La Sapienza". He works in engineering and management. His main interests are in celestial mechanics and archeoastronomy, where he focused on astronomical studies of the ancient Assyrians, Babylonians and Mayans.	JPL · 214180

== 214201–214300 ==
back to top

Named minor planet	Provisional	This minor planet was named for...	Ref · Catalog
214290 Leeannmarshall	2005 GT_{206}	LeeAnn Marshall (b. 1956), an American senior administrative coordinator at the Southwest Research Institute.	IAU · 214290

== 214301–214400 ==
back to top

Named minor planet	Provisional	This minor planet was named for...	Ref · Catalog
214378 Kleinmann	2005 LW_{23}	Georges Kleinmann (born 1930), retired journalist and producer for Swiss public television who covered the Apollo space missions.	JPL · 214378

== 214401–214500 ==
back to top

Named minor planet	Provisional	This minor planet was named for...	Ref · Catalog
214432 Belprahon	2005 QA_{57}	Belprahon, a Swiss village located in the Bernese Jura, the French-speaking part of the canton of Bern.	IAU · 214432
214474 Long Island	2005 TB_{14}	Long Island, the 190-km-long, fish-shaped island that extends east from New York City. The island is composed of multiple terminal moraines deposited during the most recent glacial period.	IAU · 214474
214475 Chrisbayus	2005 TS_{14}	Chris Bayus (born 1957), American amateur astronomer and an accomplished astrophotographer.	JPL · 214475
214476 Stephencolbert	2005 TO_{15}	Stephen Colbert (born 1964), American political satirist, writer, comedian, actor and television host.	JPL · 214476
214485 Dupouy	2005 UV_{7}	Philippe Dupouy (born 1952), founder of the Observatoire de Dax in 1978.	JPL · 214485
214487 Baranivka	2005 UP_{12}	The Ukrainian town of Baranivka, known for one of the oldest plants for the production of porcelain	JPL · 214487

== 214501–214600 ==
back to top

Named minor planet	Provisional	This minor planet was named for...	Ref · Catalog
214558 Korányi	2006 QB_{1}	Frigyes Korányi (1827–1913), Hungarian internist, university professor, and one of the early leading figures in Hungarian medicine.	JPL · 214558

== 214601–214700 ==
back to top

Named minor planet	Provisional	This minor planet was named for...	Ref · Catalog
214678 Slavėnas	2006 SR_{197}	Paulius Slavėnas (1901–1991), Lithuanian astronomer and historian of science.	JPL · 214678

== 214701–214800 ==
back to top

Named minor planet	Provisional	This minor planet was named for...	Ref · Catalog
214715 Silvanofuso	2006 TF_{7}	Silvano Fuso (born 1959), Italian teacher and a science writer, who worked in the field of molecular spectroscopy	JPL · 214715
214719 Louges	2006 TY_{9}	Jacques Louges, French sailor, business leader, and co-founder of the Dax observatory (MPC code 958).	IAU · 214719
214772 UNICEF	2006 UO_{64}	The United Nations Children's Fund (UNICEF) is a United Nations' program headquartered in New York City that provides humanitarian and developmental assistance to children and mothers in developing countries.	JPL · 214772

== 214801–214900 ==
back to top

Named minor planet	Provisional	This minor planet was named for...	Ref · Catalog
214819 Gianotti	2006 VK_{2}	Fabiola Gianotti (born 1960), the coordinator of the ATLAS experiment at the CERN's Large Hadron Collider.	JPL · 214819
214820 Faustocoppi	2006 VC_{14}	Fausto Coppi (1919–1960), an Italian cyclist and the dominant international cyclist of the years before and after the Second World War.	JPL · 214820
214863 Seiradakis	2006 YB_{55}	John H. Seiradakis (born 1948) is a Greek radio astronomer, emeritus professor at Aristotle University of Thessaloniki, and former Director of the Observatory of Thessaloniki. He has contributed significantly to our knowledge of pulsars, archaeoastronomy, and of the Antikythera Mechanism, the earliest known astronomical computer.	IAU · 214863
214883 Yuanxikun	2007 RL_{232}	Yuan Xikun (born 1944), a Chinese sculptor and painter.	JPL · 214883

== 214901–215000 ==
back to top

Named minor planet	Provisional	This minor planet was named for...	Ref · Catalog
214911 Viehböck	2007 TM_{184}	Franz Viehböck (born 1960), electrical engineer and first Austrian astronaut	JPL · 214911
214928 Carrara	2007 VM_{8}	Carrara is a town and municipality in the province of Massa-Carrara, Tuscany. It is the world's most important center for the extraction and processing of Carrara marble, a very precious white marble that is extracted from the nearby Apuane Alps.	JPL · 214928
214953 Giugavazzi	2007 WN_{55}	Giuseppe Gavazzi (born 1936), an Italian painter and sculptor	JPL · 214953

back to top

Preceded by 213,001–214,000	Meanings of minor-planet names List of minor planets: 214,001–215,000	Succeeded by 215,001–216,000
