= Xiao Xuchang =

Chinese geologist

- 肖序常
- Born: 12 October 1930; Anshun County, Guizhou, China
- Died: 6 December 2023 (aged 93); Beijing, China
- Education: Peking University
- Spouse: Zhou Tianhou
- Children: 2
- Scientific career
- Fields: Structural geology
- Academic advisors: Huang Jiqing; Li Chunyu

Xiao Xuchang (Chinese: 肖序常; pinyin: Xiāo Xùcháng; 12 October 1930 – 6 December 2023) was a Chinese geologist, and an academician of the Chinese Academy of Sciences. He was proficient in English, Russian, and German.

== Biography ==
Xiao was born in Anshun County, Guizhou, on 12 October 1930. Eleven days before Xiao's birth, his father Xiao Can (肖灿) sacrificed himself on the Hunan battlefield during the Northern Expedition. His mother named Huang Bofen (黄伯芬). His grandfather was a juren (举人) in the Qing dynasty (1644–1911). He was the fourth of four children, the others being: Xiao Xurong (肖序容), Xiao Xugang (肖序刚), and Xiao Xuyi (肖序仪). In 1949, he was admitted to Peking University.

After graduating in 1952, he became a member of the 641 Geological Team of the Ministry of Geology. In April 1954, he was transferred to the Nonferrous Metals Division of the Geological and Mineral Resources Department of the Ministry of Geology, where he worked as an assistant to Prof. Huang Jiqing. He joined the Chinese Communist Party in 1981. In April 1986, he rose to become director of the Institute of Geology, Chinese Academy of Geological Sciences, serving until May 1988.

On 6 December 2023, he died from an illness in Beijing, at the age of 93.

== Personal life ==
From mid 1952 to March 1954, Xiao met Zhou Tianhou (周天厚) while working at Gansu Silver Factory. Afterwards, the two got married in Beijing and had two daughters.

== Honours and awards ==
- 1982 State Natural Science Award (Second Class) for the basic characteristics of China's tectonic structure
- 1991 Member of the Chinese Academy of Sciences (CAS)
- 1993 3rd Li Siguang Geological Science Award
- 2003 Science and Technology Progress Award of the Ho Leung Ho Lee Foundation

== See also ==
- Kunlun Volcanic Group
