= Huang Jiqing =

Chinese geologist

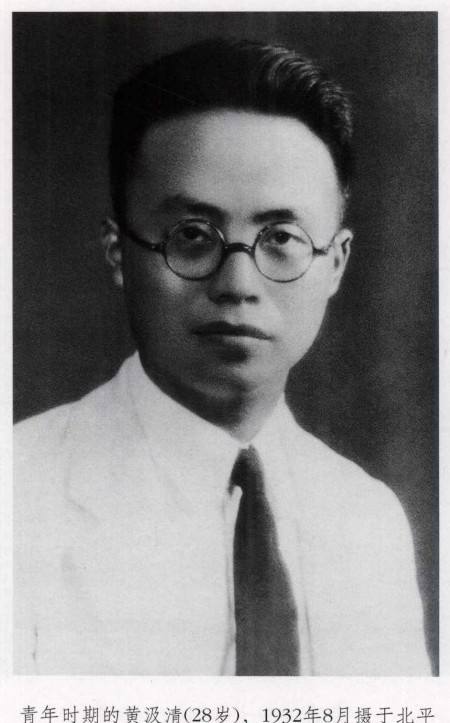

Huang Jiqing (Chinese: 黄汲清; 30 March 1904 – 22 March 1995), also known by his courtesy name Huang Degan (Chinese: 黄德淦; Te-Kan Huang), was a Chinese geologist. He was born March 30, 1904, in Renshou, Sichuan to an intellectual family. In 1928 he obtained his bachelor's degree at Peking University, and in 1935 he got his PhD at University of Neuchâtel, Switzerland. After returning to China he taught at National Central University and Peking University, and served as director of the National Geological Survey, president of the Geological Society of China, director of the Southwest Geological Bureau, deputy director of the Academic Division of Earth Sciences of the Chinese Academy of Sciences, deputy president of the Chinese Academy of Geological Sciences. In 1980 Huang received an honorary doctorate from the ETH Zurich, and in 1985 he was elected as an honorary member of Geological Society of America.

In 1932 Huang published The Permian Formations of Southern China, which provided the method to subdivide the Permian in China. In 1945 he pioneered to use the theory of polycyclic tectonic movement to treat the geotectonic characteristics of China. The first geotectonic map of China was also compiled under his supervision, for which he won a State Natural Science Award in 1982.

Asteroid 215023 Huangjiqing, discovered by the PMO NEO Survey Program in 2009, was named in his memory. The official naming citation was published by the WGSBN in September 2021.
