= Meanings of minor-planet names: 215001–216000 =

As minor planet discoveries are confirmed, they are given a permanent number by the IAU's Minor Planet Center (MPC), and the discoverers can then submit names for them, following the IAU's naming conventions. The list below concerns those minor planets in the specified number-range that have received names, and explains the meanings of those names.

Official naming citations of newly named small Solar System bodies are approved and published in a bulletin by IAU's Working Group for Small Bodies Nomenclature (WGSBN). Before May 2021, citations were published in MPC's Minor Planet Circulars for many decades. Recent citations can also be found on the JPL Small-Body Database (SBDB). Until his death in 2016, German astronomer Lutz D. Schmadel compiled these citations into the Dictionary of Minor Planet Names (DMP) and regularly updated the collection.

Based on Paul Herget's The Names of the Minor Planets, Schmadel also researched the unclear origin of numerous asteroids, most of which had been named prior to World War II. This article incorporates text from this source, which is in the public domain: SBDB New namings may only be added to this list below after official publication as the preannouncement of names is condemned. The WGSBN publishes a comprehensive guideline for the naming rules of non-cometary small Solar System bodies.

== 215001–215100 ==
Named minor planet	Provisional	This minor planet was named for...	Ref · Catalog
215016 Catherinegriffin	2008 US_{3}	Catherine Grennan (née Griffin, 1939–2004) was the mother of the discoverer.	JPL · 215016
215021 Fanjingshan	2009 BJ_{71}	Fanjingshan, located in Tongren City of Guizhou Province (south-west China), was added to the World Heritage List by UNESCO at the 42nd World Heritage Conference in 2018. The rare wildlife and native forest ecosystem are well protected in the region of Fanjingshan National Nature Reserve.	JPL · 215021
215023 Huangjiqing	2009 BR_{76}	Huang Jiqing (1904–1995) was a Chinese geologist and member of the Chinese Academy of Geological Sciences who is considered a founder of modern geology in China.	IAU · 215023
215044 Joãoalves	2009 DW_{4}	Joõ Alves (born 1968) was the director of Calar Alto Observatory from 2006 to 2010 and is now professor of stellar astrophysics at the University of Vienna.	JPL · 215044
215080 Kaohsiung	2009 FX_{18}	Kaohsiung, Taiwan's second-largest city.	JPL · 215080
215089 Hermanfrid	2709 P-L	Hermanfrid Schubart, German expert in prehistoric archaeology.	JPL · 215089

== 215101–215200 ==
back to top

Named minor planet	Provisional	This minor planet was named for...	Ref · Catalog
There are no named minor planets in this number range

== 215201–215300 ==
back to top

Named minor planet	Provisional	This minor planet was named for...	Ref · Catalog
There are no named minor planets in this number range

== 215301–215400 ==
back to top

Named minor planet	Provisional	This minor planet was named for...	Ref · Catalog
There are no named minor planets in this number range

== 215401–215500 ==
back to top

Named minor planet	Provisional	This minor planet was named for...	Ref · Catalog
215423 Winnecke	2002 GE_{178}	Friedrich August Theodor Winnecke (1835–1897), astronomer at Berlin, Pulkovo and Strasbourg.	JPL · 215423
215458 Yucun	2002 PJ_{178}	Yucun, a village that located in Anji, Zhejiang Province, China.	IAU · 215458
215463 Jobse	2002 QQ_{66}	Klaas Jobse, Dutch gardener and amateur astronomer who operates the Cyclops Observatory in Oostkapelle and a fireball all-sky camera.	JPL · 215463

== 215501–215600 ==
back to top

Named minor planet	Provisional	This minor planet was named for...	Ref · Catalog
215592 Normarose	2003 PR_{4}	Norma Rose (1929–2001) was the mother of two surviving children, Cheryll and Jim Riffle, the latter being the first discoverer of this minor planet.	JPL · 215592

== 215601–215700 ==
back to top

Named minor planet	Provisional	This minor planet was named for...	Ref · Catalog
215685 Cherylalexander	2003 WK_{185}	Cheryl D. Alexander (born 1968), American manager at Marshall Space Flight Center and helped advance the exploration of the Kuiper Belt.	JPL · 215685

== 215701–215800 ==
back to top

Named minor planet	Provisional	This minor planet was named for...	Ref · Catalog
There are no named minor planets in this number range

== 215801–215900 ==
back to top

Named minor planet	Provisional	This minor planet was named for...	Ref · Catalog
215809 Hugoschwarz	2004 RN_{287}	Hugo Schwarz (1953–2006), Dutch astronomer.	JPL · 215809
215841 Čimelice	2005 CH_{37}	Cimelice, a south Bohemian village on the route from Písek to Prague.	JPL · 215841
215868 Rohrer	2005 EA_{153}	Heinrich Rohrer (1933–2013), Swiss physicist and Nobel laureate	JPL · 215868
215884 Jayantmurthy	2005 EX_{296}	Jayant Murthy (b. 1961), a former Director of the Indian Institute of Astrophysics.	IAU · 215884
215886 Barryarnold	2005 FP	Barry Arnold (born 1945), a friend of French discoverer Bernard Christophe	JPL · 215886

== 215901–216000 ==
back to top

Named minor planet	Provisional	This minor planet was named for...	Ref · Catalog
215905 Andrewpoppe	2005 GF_{223}	Andrew R. Poppe (b. 1984), an American space scientist, and interplanetary dust expert.	IAU · 215905
215970 Campidoglio	2005 QV_{66}	Campidoglio, the current seat of the Rome City Council, is one of the seven hills where Rome was founded in 753 BCE.	IAU · 215970

back to top

Preceded by 214,001–215,000	Meanings of minor-planet names List of minor planets: 215,001–216,000	Succeeded by 216,001–217,000
