= List of minor planets: 215001–216000 =

The following is a partial list of minor planets, running from minor-planet number 215001 through 216000, inclusive. The primary data for this and other partial lists is based on JPL's "Small-Body Orbital Elements" and data available from the Minor Planet Center. Critical list information is also provided by the MPC, unless otherwise specified from Lowell Observatory. A detailed description of the table's columns and additional sources are given on the main page including a complete list of every page in this series, and a statistical break-up on the dynamical classification of minor planets.

Also see the summary list of all named bodies in numerical and alphabetical order, and the corresponding naming citations for the number range of this particular list. New namings may only be added to this list after official publication, as the preannouncement of names is condemned by the Working Group for Small Bodies Nomenclature of the International Astronomical Union.

Near-Earth obj.	MBA (inner)	MBA (outer)	Centaur
Mars-crosser	MBA (middle)	Jupiter trojan	Trans-Neptunian obj.
Unclassified

== 215001–215100 ==
Designation			Discovery			Properties		Ref
Permanent	Provisional	Named after	Date	Site	Discoverer(s)	Category	Diam.	Ref
215001	2008 CO_{149}	—	February 9, 2008	Kitt Peak	Spacewatch	EOS	4.1 km	MPC · JPL
215002	2008 CE_{158}	—	February 9, 2008	Catalina	CSS	·	2.8 km	MPC · JPL
215003	2008 CQ_{162}	—	February 10, 2008	Kitt Peak	Spacewatch	·	2.8 km	MPC · JPL
215004	2008 CW_{198}	—	February 12, 2008	Kitt Peak	Spacewatch	·	1.4 km	MPC · JPL
215005	2008 DL_{6}	—	February 24, 2008	Mount Lemmon	Mount Lemmon Survey	·	1.9 km	MPC · JPL
215006	2008 DN_{31}	—	February 27, 2008	Catalina	CSS	EOS	2.8 km	MPC · JPL
215007	2008 DC_{34}	—	February 27, 2008	Mount Lemmon	Mount Lemmon Survey	·	3.0 km	MPC · JPL
215008	2008 DT_{65}	—	February 28, 2008	Catalina	CSS	·	2.4 km	MPC · JPL
215009	2008 DR_{79}	—	February 29, 2008	Catalina	CSS	·	5.8 km	MPC · JPL
215010	2008 EU_{18}	—	March 2, 2008	Kitt Peak	Spacewatch	·	3.9 km	MPC · JPL
215011	2008 ES_{19}	—	March 2, 2008	Mount Lemmon	Mount Lemmon Survey	VER	3.5 km	MPC · JPL
215012	2008 EG_{103}	—	March 5, 2008	Mount Lemmon	Mount Lemmon Survey	·	4.9 km	MPC · JPL
215013	2008 GX_{67}	—	April 6, 2008	Socorro	LINEAR	·	3.2 km	MPC · JPL
215014	2008 SM_{1}	—	September 22, 2008	Sierra Stars	Tozzi, F.	·	3.0 km	MPC · JPL
215015	2008 TP_{120}	—	October 7, 2008	Mount Lemmon	Mount Lemmon Survey	·	4.5 km	MPC · JPL
215016 Catherinegriffin	2008 US_{3}	Catherinegriffin	October 21, 2008	Raheny	Grennan, D.	·	3.5 km	MPC · JPL
215017	2008 XD_{49}	—	December 7, 2008	Mount Lemmon	Mount Lemmon Survey	HNS	1.4 km	MPC · JPL
215018	2008 YS_{51}	—	December 29, 2008	Mount Lemmon	Mount Lemmon Survey	·	790 m	MPC · JPL
215019	2008 YB_{159}	—	December 30, 2008	Kitt Peak	Spacewatch	·	3.0 km	MPC · JPL
215020	2009 BE_{14}	—	January 25, 2009	Kitt Peak	Spacewatch	L5	10 km	MPC · JPL
215021 Fanjingshan	2009 BJ_{71}	Fanjingshan	January 26, 2009	XuYi	PMO NEO Survey Program	JUN	1.4 km	MPC · JPL
215022	2009 BA_{73}	—	January 29, 2009	Dauban	Chante-Perdrix	·	3.2 km	MPC · JPL
215023 Huangjiqing	2009 BR_{76}	Huangjiqing	January 27, 2009	XuYi	PMO NEO Survey Program	·	3.2 km	MPC · JPL
215024	2009 BV_{81}	—	January 28, 2009	Catalina	CSS	MAR	2.1 km	MPC · JPL
215025	2009 BG_{86}	—	January 25, 2009	Kitt Peak	Spacewatch	·	1.5 km	MPC · JPL
215026	2009 BP_{108}	—	January 29, 2009	Mount Lemmon	Mount Lemmon Survey	KOR	2.0 km	MPC · JPL
215027	2009 BK_{111}	—	January 28, 2009	Catalina	CSS	·	1.5 km	MPC · JPL
215028	2009 BO_{112}	—	January 31, 2009	Mount Lemmon	Mount Lemmon Survey	V	770 m	MPC · JPL
215029	2009 BF_{130}	—	January 31, 2009	Mount Lemmon	Mount Lemmon Survey	·	3.0 km	MPC · JPL
215030	2009 BF_{170}	—	January 18, 2009	Mount Lemmon	Mount Lemmon Survey	·	3.0 km	MPC · JPL
215031	2009 BA_{179}	—	January 20, 2009	Mount Lemmon	Mount Lemmon Survey	V	1.0 km	MPC · JPL
215032	2009 BD_{179}	—	January 30, 2009	Mount Lemmon	Mount Lemmon Survey	EOS	3.0 km	MPC · JPL
215033	2009 CP_{12}	—	February 2, 2009	Catalina	CSS	·	3.7 km	MPC · JPL
215034	2009 CR_{12}	—	February 2, 2009	Catalina	CSS	V	850 m	MPC · JPL
215035	2009 CD_{28}	—	February 1, 2009	Kitt Peak	Spacewatch	·	2.8 km	MPC · JPL
215036	2009 CC_{39}	—	February 13, 2009	Kitt Peak	Spacewatch	·	1.6 km	MPC · JPL
215037	2009 CR_{40}	—	February 13, 2009	Kitt Peak	Spacewatch	·	1.6 km	MPC · JPL
215038	2009 CZ_{43}	—	February 14, 2009	Kitt Peak	Spacewatch	MAS	940 m	MPC · JPL
215039	2009 CM_{53}	—	February 13, 2009	La Sagra	OAM	·	2.2 km	MPC · JPL
215040	2009 CS_{59}	—	February 14, 2009	Catalina	CSS	·	1.9 km	MPC · JPL
215041	2009 CA_{60}	—	February 5, 2009	Mount Lemmon	Mount Lemmon Survey	·	3.9 km	MPC · JPL
215042	2009 DK_{3}	—	February 19, 2009	Sierra Stars	Tozzi, F.	·	1.9 km	MPC · JPL
215043	2009 DF_{4}	—	February 19, 2009	Skylive	Skylive	·	3.1 km	MPC · JPL
215044 Joãoalves	2009 DW_{4}	Joãoalves	February 20, 2009	Calar Alto	F. Hormuth	MAS	760 m	MPC · JPL
215045	2009 DQ_{6}	—	February 17, 2009	Kitt Peak	Spacewatch	·	1.2 km	MPC · JPL
215046	2009 DS_{9}	—	February 18, 2009	Socorro	LINEAR	·	4.1 km	MPC · JPL
215047	2009 DE_{17}	—	February 21, 2009	La Sagra	OAM	·	1.7 km	MPC · JPL
215048	2009 DZ_{18}	—	February 20, 2009	Kitt Peak	Spacewatch	·	2.0 km	MPC · JPL
215049	2009 DQ_{34}	—	February 20, 2009	Kitt Peak	Spacewatch	·	4.2 km	MPC · JPL
215050	2009 DU_{40}	—	February 16, 2009	La Sagra	OAM	·	1.8 km	MPC · JPL
215051	2009 DL_{41}	—	February 18, 2009	La Sagra	OAM	·	1.9 km	MPC · JPL
215052	2009 DA_{47}	—	February 28, 2009	Socorro	LINEAR	·	7.1 km	MPC · JPL
215053	2009 DL_{47}	—	February 26, 2009	Calvin-Rehoboth	Calvin College	·	3.7 km	MPC · JPL
215054	2009 DJ_{64}	—	February 22, 2009	Kitt Peak	Spacewatch	V	970 m	MPC · JPL
215055	2009 DR_{70}	—	February 26, 2009	Mount Lemmon	Mount Lemmon Survey	MAS	790 m	MPC · JPL
215056	2009 DN_{75}	—	February 21, 2009	La Sagra	OAM	THM	3.4 km	MPC · JPL
215057	2009 DE_{83}	—	February 24, 2009	Kitt Peak	Spacewatch	NYS	1.2 km	MPC · JPL
215058	2009 DW_{94}	—	February 28, 2009	Kitt Peak	Spacewatch	CYB	7.2 km	MPC · JPL
215059	2009 DK_{113}	—	February 27, 2009	Kitt Peak	Spacewatch	·	1.9 km	MPC · JPL
215060	2009 DN_{119}	—	February 27, 2009	Kitt Peak	Spacewatch	·	3.9 km	MPC · JPL
215061	2009 DM_{124}	—	February 19, 2009	Kitt Peak	Spacewatch	·	2.7 km	MPC · JPL
215062	2009 DC_{125}	—	February 19, 2009	Kitt Peak	Spacewatch	·	2.6 km	MPC · JPL
215063	2009 DQ_{125}	—	February 19, 2009	Kitt Peak	Spacewatch	·	1.6 km	MPC · JPL
215064	2009 DC_{126}	—	February 19, 2009	Kitt Peak	Spacewatch	·	1.5 km	MPC · JPL
215065	2009 DR_{126}	—	February 20, 2009	Kitt Peak	Spacewatch	NYS	2.1 km	MPC · JPL
215066	2009 DX_{126}	—	February 20, 2009	Kitt Peak	Spacewatch	·	1.7 km	MPC · JPL
215067	2009 DY_{126}	—	February 20, 2009	Kitt Peak	Spacewatch	·	2.2 km	MPC · JPL
215068	2009 DU_{129}	—	February 27, 2009	Kitt Peak	Spacewatch	·	3.8 km	MPC · JPL
215069	2009 DV_{129}	—	February 27, 2009	Kitt Peak	Spacewatch	·	2.1 km	MPC · JPL
215070	2009 DD_{130}	—	February 27, 2009	Kitt Peak	Spacewatch	·	800 m	MPC · JPL
215071	2009 ET_{3}	—	March 15, 2009	La Sagra	OAM	·	1.7 km	MPC · JPL
215072	2009 EV_{10}	—	March 2, 2009	Kitt Peak	Spacewatch	·	1.5 km	MPC · JPL
215073	2009 EC_{20}	—	March 15, 2009	La Sagra	OAM	·	3.0 km	MPC · JPL
215074	2009 EV_{20}	—	March 15, 2009	Kitt Peak	Spacewatch	·	3.1 km	MPC · JPL
215075	2009 EY_{20}	—	March 15, 2009	Kitt Peak	Spacewatch	·	1.3 km	MPC · JPL
215076	2009 FP_{3}	—	March 17, 2009	La Sagra	OAM	·	2.3 km	MPC · JPL
215077	2009 FY_{15}	—	March 17, 2009	Kitt Peak	Spacewatch	·	1.7 km	MPC · JPL
215078	2009 FL_{18}	—	March 19, 2009	La Sagra	OAM	·	2.4 km	MPC · JPL
215079	2009 FO_{18}	—	March 19, 2009	La Sagra	OAM	EOS	2.5 km	MPC · JPL
215080 Kaohsiung	2009 FX_{18}	Kaohsiung	March 20, 2009	Lulin	Tsai, Y.-S., Lin, C.-S.	·	2.2 km	MPC · JPL
215081	2009 FU_{21}	—	March 17, 2009	Catalina	CSS	·	1.9 km	MPC · JPL
215082	2009 FT_{22}	—	March 19, 2009	Mount Lemmon	Mount Lemmon Survey	·	1.6 km	MPC · JPL
215083	2009 FH_{23}	—	March 21, 2009	Kitt Peak	Spacewatch	·	3.1 km	MPC · JPL
215084	2009 FX_{29}	—	March 25, 2009	Mayhill	Lowe, A.	·	2.0 km	MPC · JPL
215085	2009 FZ_{36}	—	March 21, 2009	Catalina	CSS	·	3.0 km	MPC · JPL
215086	2009 FJ_{43}	—	March 29, 2009	Kachina	Kachina	·	5.5 km	MPC · JPL
215087	2009 FL_{43}	—	March 30, 2009	Sierra Stars	Tozzi, F.	·	5.5 km	MPC · JPL
215088	2220 P-L	—	September 24, 1960	Palomar	C. J. van Houten, I. van Houten-Groeneveld, T. Gehrels	·	6.3 km	MPC · JPL
215089 Hermanfrid	2709 P-L	Hermanfrid	September 24, 1960	Palomar	C. J. van Houten, I. van Houten-Groeneveld, T. Gehrels	3:2 · SHU	8.1 km	MPC · JPL
215090	2823 P-L	—	September 24, 1960	Palomar	C. J. van Houten, I. van Houten-Groeneveld, T. Gehrels	·	900 m	MPC · JPL
215091	6228 P-L	—	September 24, 1960	Palomar	C. J. van Houten, I. van Houten-Groeneveld, T. Gehrels	·	1.1 km	MPC · JPL
215092	6256 P-L	—	September 24, 1960	Palomar	C. J. van Houten, I. van Houten-Groeneveld, T. Gehrels	·	1.7 km	MPC · JPL
215093	6823 P-L	—	September 24, 1960	Palomar	C. J. van Houten, I. van Houten-Groeneveld, T. Gehrels	MAS	1.1 km	MPC · JPL
215094	5043 T-2	—	September 25, 1973	Palomar	C. J. van Houten, I. van Houten-Groeneveld, T. Gehrels	·	5.8 km	MPC · JPL
215095	3131 T-3	—	October 16, 1977	Palomar	C. J. van Houten, I. van Houten-Groeneveld, T. Gehrels	·	6.2 km	MPC · JPL
215096	3259 T-3	—	October 16, 1977	Palomar	C. J. van Houten, I. van Houten-Groeneveld, T. Gehrels	NYS	1.5 km	MPC · JPL
215097	5049 T-3	—	October 16, 1977	Palomar	C. J. van Houten, I. van Houten-Groeneveld, T. Gehrels	·	1.7 km	MPC · JPL
215098	5053 T-3	—	October 16, 1977	Palomar	C. J. van Houten, I. van Houten-Groeneveld, T. Gehrels	·	1.9 km	MPC · JPL
215099	1981 EN_{36}	—	March 7, 1981	Siding Spring	S. J. Bus	·	2.7 km	MPC · JPL
215100	1992 RD	—	September 2, 1992	Siding Spring	R. H. McNaught	PHO	3.7 km	MPC · JPL

== 215101–215200 ==
back to top

Designation			Discovery			Properties		Ref
Permanent	Provisional	Named after	Date	Site	Discoverer(s)	Category	Diam.	Ref
215101	1995 LB	—	June 1, 1995	Siding Spring	R. H. McNaught	H	1.0 km	MPC · JPL
215102	1995 OC_{7}	—	July 24, 1995	Kitt Peak	Spacewatch	(5)	1.7 km	MPC · JPL
215103	1995 UZ_{15}	—	October 17, 1995	Kitt Peak	Spacewatch	EOS	2.8 km	MPC · JPL
215104	1995 UL_{18}	—	October 18, 1995	Kitt Peak	Spacewatch	·	1.8 km	MPC · JPL
215105	1995 UV_{52}	—	October 23, 1995	Kitt Peak	Spacewatch	·	1.9 km	MPC · JPL
215106	1995 VQ_{2}	—	November 14, 1995	Kitt Peak	Spacewatch	MAS	1.0 km	MPC · JPL
215107	1996 RX_{15}	—	September 13, 1996	Kitt Peak	Spacewatch	L4	10 km	MPC · JPL
215108	1996 RC_{18}	—	September 14, 1996	Kitt Peak	Spacewatch	·	1.3 km	MPC · JPL
215109	1996 VM_{15}	—	November 5, 1996	Kitt Peak	Spacewatch	·	950 m	MPC · JPL
215110	1997 NO_{5}	—	July 5, 1997	Kitt Peak	Spacewatch	L5	16 km	MPC · JPL
215111	1997 WK_{56}	—	November 21, 1997	Kitt Peak	Spacewatch	·	2.1 km	MPC · JPL
215112	1997 XR_{7}	—	December 6, 1997	Caussols	ODAS	·	3.2 km	MPC · JPL
215113	1998 DD_{2}	—	February 21, 1998	Modra	A. Galád, Pravda, A.	·	2.3 km	MPC · JPL
215114	1998 DJ_{8}	—	February 21, 1998	Xinglong	SCAP	·	1.4 km	MPC · JPL
215115	1998 EO	—	March 2, 1998	Caussols	ODAS	V	730 m	MPC · JPL
215116	1998 MG_{44}	—	June 26, 1998	La Silla	E. W. Elst	·	1.9 km	MPC · JPL
215117	1998 RQ_{10}	—	September 13, 1998	Kitt Peak	Spacewatch	·	1.1 km	MPC · JPL
215118	1998 TO_{12}	—	October 13, 1998	Kitt Peak	Spacewatch	·	1.2 km	MPC · JPL
215119	1998 WU_{38}	—	November 21, 1998	Kitt Peak	Spacewatch	·	1.5 km	MPC · JPL
215120	1999 JG_{4}	—	May 10, 1999	Socorro	LINEAR	·	1.2 km	MPC · JPL
215121	1999 JB_{11}	—	May 14, 1999	Socorro	LINEAR	·	540 m	MPC · JPL
215122	1999 LG_{4}	—	June 9, 1999	Socorro	LINEAR	·	1.6 km	MPC · JPL
215123	1999 RS_{41}	—	September 15, 1999	Kleť	Kleť	H	750 m	MPC · JPL
215124	1999 RV_{73}	—	September 13, 1999	Socorro	LINEAR	·	3.2 km	MPC · JPL
215125	1999 RY_{78}	—	September 7, 1999	Socorro	LINEAR	·	1.3 km	MPC · JPL
215126	1999 RX_{122}	—	September 9, 1999	Socorro	LINEAR	·	2.5 km	MPC · JPL
215127	1999 RG_{135}	—	September 9, 1999	Socorro	LINEAR	PHO	1.2 km	MPC · JPL
215128	1999 RO_{138}	—	September 9, 1999	Socorro	LINEAR	EUN	1.8 km	MPC · JPL
215129	1999 RW_{153}	—	September 9, 1999	Socorro	LINEAR	V	990 m	MPC · JPL
215130	1999 RB_{199}	—	September 10, 1999	Socorro	LINEAR	·	7.0 km	MPC · JPL
215131	1999 RH_{237}	—	September 8, 1999	Catalina	CSS	ERI	2.3 km	MPC · JPL
215132	1999 TQ_{4}	—	October 3, 1999	Socorro	LINEAR	H	810 m	MPC · JPL
215133	1999 TU_{33}	—	October 4, 1999	Socorro	LINEAR	LIX	5.4 km	MPC · JPL
215134	1999 TG_{65}	—	October 8, 1999	Kitt Peak	Spacewatch	·	3.3 km	MPC · JPL
215135	1999 TA_{124}	—	October 4, 1999	Socorro	LINEAR	·	1.8 km	MPC · JPL
215136	1999 TY_{163}	—	October 9, 1999	Socorro	LINEAR	·	1.4 km	MPC · JPL
215137	1999 TW_{171}	—	October 10, 1999	Socorro	LINEAR	NYS	1.7 km	MPC · JPL
215138	1999 TL_{206}	—	October 13, 1999	Socorro	LINEAR	·	2.2 km	MPC · JPL
215139	1999 TS_{218}	—	October 15, 1999	Socorro	LINEAR	·	4.6 km	MPC · JPL
215140	1999 TP_{260}	—	October 11, 1999	Kitt Peak	Spacewatch	·	1.4 km	MPC · JPL
215141	1999 TS_{280}	—	October 8, 1999	Socorro	LINEAR	LUT	5.7 km	MPC · JPL
215142	1999 UO_{39}	—	October 31, 1999	Kitt Peak	Spacewatch	·	3.4 km	MPC · JPL
215143	1999 UN_{50}	—	October 30, 1999	Catalina	CSS	·	1.6 km	MPC · JPL
215144	1999 UV_{51}	—	October 31, 1999	Catalina	CSS	PHO	1.5 km	MPC · JPL
215145	1999 UM_{57}	—	October 29, 1999	Kitt Peak	Spacewatch	NYS	1.1 km	MPC · JPL
215146	1999 VA_{28}	—	November 3, 1999	Socorro	LINEAR	·	1.7 km	MPC · JPL
215147	1999 VK_{66}	—	November 4, 1999	Socorro	LINEAR	·	1.7 km	MPC · JPL
215148	1999 VJ_{69}	—	November 4, 1999	Socorro	LINEAR	·	1.8 km	MPC · JPL
215149	1999 VC_{114}	—	November 9, 1999	Catalina	CSS	EUP	6.2 km	MPC · JPL
215150	1999 VJ_{117}	—	November 9, 1999	Kitt Peak	Spacewatch	NYS	1.0 km	MPC · JPL
215151	1999 VP_{150}	—	November 14, 1999	Socorro	LINEAR	TIR	2.5 km	MPC · JPL
215152	1999 VF_{174}	—	November 5, 1999	Anderson Mesa	LONEOS	H	950 m	MPC · JPL
215153	1999 VX_{193}	—	November 3, 1999	Socorro	LINEAR	·	5.3 km	MPC · JPL
215154	1999 XR_{139}	—	December 2, 1999	Kitt Peak	Spacewatch	·	1.1 km	MPC · JPL
215155	1999 XH_{146}	—	December 7, 1999	Kitt Peak	Spacewatch	·	1.4 km	MPC · JPL
215156	1999 XX_{215}	—	December 13, 1999	Kitt Peak	Spacewatch	EUN	1.7 km	MPC · JPL
215157	1999 XY_{251}	—	December 9, 1999	Kitt Peak	Spacewatch	·	1.4 km	MPC · JPL
215158	2000 AE_{59}	—	January 4, 2000	Socorro	LINEAR	·	5.0 km	MPC · JPL
215159	2000 AU_{91}	—	January 5, 2000	Socorro	LINEAR	·	2.3 km	MPC · JPL
215160	2000 AY_{102}	—	January 5, 2000	Socorro	LINEAR	·	3.4 km	MPC · JPL
215161	2000 AS_{178}	—	January 7, 2000	Socorro	LINEAR	·	2.3 km	MPC · JPL
215162	2000 BB_{5}	—	January 21, 2000	Socorro	LINEAR	(194)	2.4 km	MPC · JPL
215163	2000 BC_{9}	—	January 26, 2000	Kitt Peak	Spacewatch	EOS	3.3 km	MPC · JPL
215164	2000 CN_{15}	—	February 2, 2000	Socorro	LINEAR	·	2.4 km	MPC · JPL
215165	2000 CG_{22}	—	February 2, 2000	Socorro	LINEAR	·	3.1 km	MPC · JPL
215166	2000 CQ_{40}	—	February 1, 2000	Catalina	CSS	·	1.8 km	MPC · JPL
215167	2000 EL_{26}	—	March 5, 2000	Socorro	LINEAR	AMO	590 m	MPC · JPL
215168	2000 EU_{29}	—	March 5, 2000	Socorro	LINEAR	ADE	4.3 km	MPC · JPL
215169	2000 EM_{112}	—	March 9, 2000	Socorro	LINEAR	·	2.2 km	MPC · JPL
215170	2000 FR_{9}	—	March 30, 2000	Kitt Peak	Spacewatch	·	2.5 km	MPC · JPL
215171	2000 FX_{23}	—	March 29, 2000	Socorro	LINEAR	·	3.0 km	MPC · JPL
215172	2000 GQ_{67}	—	April 5, 2000	Socorro	LINEAR	·	2.5 km	MPC · JPL
215173	2000 GO_{73}	—	April 5, 2000	Socorro	LINEAR	·	3.9 km	MPC · JPL
215174	2000 GU_{100}	—	April 7, 2000	Socorro	LINEAR	·	1.8 km	MPC · JPL
215175	2000 GS_{117}	—	April 2, 2000	Kitt Peak	Spacewatch	·	2.8 km	MPC · JPL
215176	2000 GQ_{120}	—	April 5, 2000	Kitt Peak	Spacewatch	MIS	3.2 km	MPC · JPL
215177	2000 GM_{163}	—	April 10, 2000	Socorro	LINEAR	·	2.3 km	MPC · JPL
215178	2000 GO_{166}	—	April 5, 2000	Socorro	LINEAR	·	2.4 km	MPC · JPL
215179	2000 GQ_{171}	—	April 5, 2000	Anderson Mesa	LONEOS	·	2.3 km	MPC · JPL
215180	2000 HX_{2}	—	April 25, 2000	Kitt Peak	Spacewatch	·	2.0 km	MPC · JPL
215181	2000 HE_{3}	—	April 26, 2000	Kitt Peak	Spacewatch	·	2.1 km	MPC · JPL
215182	2000 HE_{67}	—	April 27, 2000	Kitt Peak	Spacewatch	GEF	1.7 km	MPC · JPL
215183	2000 HB_{74}	—	April 29, 2000	Socorro	LINEAR	·	2.2 km	MPC · JPL
215184	2000 HX_{103}	—	April 27, 2000	Anderson Mesa	LONEOS	·	2.7 km	MPC · JPL
215185	2000 JD_{83}	—	May 7, 2000	Socorro	LINEAR	·	2.4 km	MPC · JPL
215186	2000 KX	—	May 24, 2000	Kitt Peak	Spacewatch	·	4.0 km	MPC · JPL
215187	2000 LQ_{25}	—	June 7, 2000	Socorro	LINEAR	·	3.1 km	MPC · JPL
215188	2000 NM	—	July 2, 2000	Fitchburg	L. L. Amburgey	T_{j} (2.93) · APO +1km	2.8 km	MPC · JPL
215189	2000 NK_{10}	—	July 6, 2000	Anderson Mesa	LONEOS	·	1.4 km	MPC · JPL
215190	2000 PU_{3}	—	August 3, 2000	Bisei SG Center	BATTeRS	·	2.5 km	MPC · JPL
215191	2000 QQ_{47}	—	August 24, 2000	Socorro	LINEAR	·	1.3 km	MPC · JPL
215192	2000 QV_{155}	—	August 31, 2000	Socorro	LINEAR	·	3.3 km	MPC · JPL
215193	2000 QM_{173}	—	August 31, 2000	Socorro	LINEAR	·	1.7 km	MPC · JPL
215194	2000 SN_{18}	—	September 23, 2000	Socorro	LINEAR	·	1.2 km	MPC · JPL
215195	2000 SA_{22}	—	September 24, 2000	Socorro	LINEAR	·	4.7 km	MPC · JPL
215196	2000 SK_{30}	—	September 24, 2000	Socorro	LINEAR	·	1.2 km	MPC · JPL
215197	2000 SN_{42}	—	September 24, 2000	Socorro	LINEAR	·	500 m	MPC · JPL
215198	2000 SZ_{69}	—	September 24, 2000	Socorro	LINEAR	·	810 m	MPC · JPL
215199	2000 SB_{130}	—	September 22, 2000	Socorro	LINEAR	L5	20 km	MPC · JPL
215200	2000 SB_{134}	—	September 23, 2000	Socorro	LINEAR	EOS	3.2 km	MPC · JPL

== 215201–215300 ==
back to top

Designation			Discovery			Properties		Ref
Permanent	Provisional	Named after	Date	Site	Discoverer(s)	Category	Diam.	Ref
215201	2000 SX_{139}	—	September 23, 2000	Socorro	LINEAR	EOS	3.3 km	MPC · JPL
215202	2000 SZ_{159}	—	September 22, 2000	Socorro	LINEAR	·	2.6 km	MPC · JPL
215203	2000 SO_{191}	—	September 24, 2000	Socorro	LINEAR	·	820 m	MPC · JPL
215204	2000 SL_{208}	—	September 24, 2000	Socorro	LINEAR	·	960 m	MPC · JPL
215205	2000 SB_{224}	—	September 27, 2000	Socorro	LINEAR	·	3.9 km	MPC · JPL
215206	2000 SY_{248}	—	September 24, 2000	Socorro	LINEAR	·	840 m	MPC · JPL
215207	2000 SO_{269}	—	September 27, 2000	Socorro	LINEAR	·	1.3 km	MPC · JPL
215208	2000 SC_{300}	—	September 28, 2000	Socorro	LINEAR	·	3.8 km	MPC · JPL
215209	2000 SL_{339}	—	September 25, 2000	Haleakala	NEAT	TIN	1.9 km	MPC · JPL
215210	2000 SB_{351}	—	September 29, 2000	Anderson Mesa	LONEOS	·	5.2 km	MPC · JPL
215211	2000 SF_{356}	—	September 29, 2000	Anderson Mesa	LONEOS	·	4.1 km	MPC · JPL
215212	2000 TC_{11}	—	October 1, 2000	Socorro	LINEAR	·	3.1 km	MPC · JPL
215213	2000 TV_{18}	—	October 1, 2000	Socorro	LINEAR	EOS	2.6 km	MPC · JPL
215214	2000 TH_{20}	—	October 1, 2000	Socorro	LINEAR	·	3.8 km	MPC · JPL
215215	2000 TU_{35}	—	October 6, 2000	Anderson Mesa	LONEOS	·	1.2 km	MPC · JPL
215216	2000 UE_{9}	—	October 24, 2000	Socorro	LINEAR	·	1.6 km	MPC · JPL
215217	2000 UX_{16}	—	October 30, 2000	Oaxaca	Roe, J. M.	·	1.1 km	MPC · JPL
215218	2000 UH_{20}	—	October 24, 2000	Socorro	LINEAR	fast	4.2 km	MPC · JPL
215219	2000 UR_{112}	—	October 24, 2000	Socorro	LINEAR	EOS	3.4 km	MPC · JPL
215220	2000 VJ_{13}	—	November 1, 2000	Socorro	LINEAR	·	1.8 km	MPC · JPL
215221	2000 WA_{19}	—	November 21, 2000	Socorro	LINEAR	(883)	1.4 km	MPC · JPL
215222	2000 WE_{29}	—	November 20, 2000	Socorro	LINEAR	·	6.5 km	MPC · JPL
215223	2000 WM_{127}	—	November 17, 2000	Kitt Peak	Spacewatch	VER	4.8 km	MPC · JPL
215224	2000 WX_{131}	—	November 20, 2000	Anderson Mesa	LONEOS	·	1.7 km	MPC · JPL
215225	2000 WP_{140}	—	November 21, 2000	Socorro	LINEAR	NYS	1.4 km	MPC · JPL
215226	2000 WY_{160}	—	November 20, 2000	Anderson Mesa	LONEOS	·	5.3 km	MPC · JPL
215227	2000 WZ_{181}	—	November 25, 2000	Socorro	LINEAR	TIR	3.7 km	MPC · JPL
215228	2000 YX_{8}	—	December 20, 2000	Kitt Peak	Spacewatch	MAS	960 m	MPC · JPL
215229	2000 YO_{39}	—	December 30, 2000	Socorro	LINEAR	ERI	2.1 km	MPC · JPL
215230	2000 YL_{44}	—	December 30, 2000	Socorro	LINEAR	·	1.4 km	MPC · JPL
215231	2001 AX_{11}	—	January 2, 2001	Socorro	LINEAR	NYS	1.5 km	MPC · JPL
215232	2001 AK_{12}	—	January 2, 2001	Socorro	LINEAR	·	5.2 km	MPC · JPL
215233	2001 AZ_{21}	—	January 3, 2001	Socorro	LINEAR	V	960 m	MPC · JPL
215234	2001 AN_{25}	—	January 4, 2001	Socorro	LINEAR	·	1.6 km	MPC · JPL
215235	2001 BA_{30}	—	January 20, 2001	Socorro	LINEAR	·	1.9 km	MPC · JPL
215236	2001 BP_{76}	—	January 26, 2001	Kitt Peak	Spacewatch	V	1.1 km	MPC · JPL
215237	2001 DJ_{2}	—	February 16, 2001	Kitt Peak	Spacewatch	·	4.0 km	MPC · JPL
215238	2001 DJ_{14}	—	February 19, 2001	Socorro	LINEAR	·	1.2 km	MPC · JPL
215239	2001 DG_{15}	—	February 16, 2001	Socorro	LINEAR	ERI	3.5 km	MPC · JPL
215240	2001 DY_{29}	—	February 17, 2001	Socorro	LINEAR	·	4.8 km	MPC · JPL
215241	2001 DW_{64}	—	February 19, 2001	Socorro	LINEAR	·	1.8 km	MPC · JPL
215242	2001 DD_{70}	—	February 19, 2001	Socorro	LINEAR	·	3.1 km	MPC · JPL
215243	2001 DG_{97}	—	February 17, 2001	Socorro	LINEAR	L4	15 km	MPC · JPL
215244	2001 EN_{14}	—	March 15, 2001	Socorro	LINEAR	·	3.7 km	MPC · JPL
215245	2001 FW_{187}	—	March 20, 2001	Kitt Peak	Spacewatch	·	1.6 km	MPC · JPL
215246	2001 GW	—	April 13, 2001	Kitt Peak	Spacewatch	·	1.2 km	MPC · JPL
215247	2001 KY_{17}	—	May 20, 2001	Bergisch Gladbach	W. Bickel	·	1.8 km	MPC · JPL
215248	2001 KJ_{34}	—	May 18, 2001	Socorro	LINEAR	·	1.6 km	MPC · JPL
215249	2001 KD_{58}	—	May 26, 2001	Socorro	LINEAR	EUN	2.1 km	MPC · JPL
215250	2001 KS_{62}	—	May 18, 2001	Anderson Mesa	LONEOS	·	3.2 km	MPC · JPL
215251	2001 LK_{18}	—	June 13, 2001	Anderson Mesa	LONEOS	·	2.2 km	MPC · JPL
215252	2001 MB_{12}	—	June 21, 2001	Palomar	NEAT	·	2.9 km	MPC · JPL
215253	2001 MG_{18}	—	June 22, 2001	Palomar	NEAT	·	2.4 km	MPC · JPL
215254	2001 MK_{31}	—	June 21, 2001	Socorro	LINEAR	·	1.9 km	MPC · JPL
215255	2001 NJ	—	July 11, 2001	Socorro	LINEAR	BAR	3.4 km	MPC · JPL
215256	2001 NR_{2}	—	July 13, 2001	Palomar	NEAT	·	3.7 km	MPC · JPL
215257	2001 NM_{6}	—	July 15, 2001	Haleakala	NEAT	·	3.2 km	MPC · JPL
215258	2001 NP_{9}	—	July 14, 2001	Palomar	NEAT	·	2.8 km	MPC · JPL
215259	2001 ON	—	July 16, 2001	Haleakala	NEAT	·	3.0 km	MPC · JPL
215260	2001 OH_{2}	—	July 16, 2001	Anderson Mesa	LONEOS	·	2.5 km	MPC · JPL
215261	2001 OT_{14}	—	July 20, 2001	Socorro	LINEAR	JUN	1.6 km	MPC · JPL
215262	2001 OD_{16}	—	July 20, 2001	Palomar	NEAT	·	3.0 km	MPC · JPL
215263	2001 OW_{23}	—	July 16, 2001	Socorro	LINEAR	·	2.7 km	MPC · JPL
215264	2001 OT_{33}	—	July 19, 2001	Palomar	NEAT	EUN	1.8 km	MPC · JPL
215265	2001 OB_{55}	—	July 22, 2001	Palomar	NEAT	EUN	2.0 km	MPC · JPL
215266	2001 OK_{63}	—	July 19, 2001	Haleakala	NEAT	·	2.2 km	MPC · JPL
215267	2001 OA_{67}	—	July 25, 2001	Haleakala	NEAT	·	2.3 km	MPC · JPL
215268	2001 ON_{84}	—	July 18, 2001	Kitt Peak	Spacewatch	·	2.1 km	MPC · JPL
215269	2001 OC_{107}	—	July 29, 2001	Socorro	LINEAR	GEF	2.0 km	MPC · JPL
215270	2001 OV_{110}	—	July 29, 2001	Palomar	NEAT	VER	5.3 km	MPC · JPL
215271	2001 OR_{113}	—	July 19, 2001	Anderson Mesa	LONEOS	·	2.9 km	MPC · JPL
215272	2001 PK_{17}	—	August 9, 2001	Palomar	NEAT	·	3.2 km	MPC · JPL
215273	2001 PO_{34}	—	August 10, 2001	Palomar	NEAT	·	1.8 km	MPC · JPL
215274	2001 PH_{38}	—	August 11, 2001	Palomar	NEAT	·	3.3 km	MPC · JPL
215275	2001 PU_{65}	—	August 14, 2001	Haleakala	NEAT	·	4.3 km	MPC · JPL
215276	2001 QT_{32}	—	August 17, 2001	Palomar	NEAT	·	1.6 km	MPC · JPL
215277	2001 QL_{57}	—	August 16, 2001	Socorro	LINEAR	MIS	3.1 km	MPC · JPL
215278	2001 QW_{82}	—	August 17, 2001	Socorro	LINEAR	·	1.6 km	MPC · JPL
215279	2001 QN_{85}	—	August 19, 2001	Socorro	LINEAR	EUN	2.0 km	MPC · JPL
215280	2001 QC_{86}	—	August 18, 2001	Palomar	NEAT	·	2.5 km	MPC · JPL
215281	2001 QF_{121}	—	August 19, 2001	Socorro	LINEAR	·	2.2 km	MPC · JPL
215282	2001 QP_{167}	—	August 24, 2001	Haleakala	NEAT	·	2.3 km	MPC · JPL
215283	2001 QJ_{201}	—	August 22, 2001	Kitt Peak	Spacewatch	·	2.7 km	MPC · JPL
215284	2001 QB_{206}	—	August 23, 2001	Anderson Mesa	LONEOS	·	1.6 km	MPC · JPL
215285	2001 QX_{243}	—	August 24, 2001	Socorro	LINEAR	ADE	4.0 km	MPC · JPL
215286	2001 QV_{262}	—	August 25, 2001	Kitt Peak	Spacewatch	·	3.0 km	MPC · JPL
215287	2001 QW_{287}	—	August 17, 2001	Socorro	LINEAR	·	3.9 km	MPC · JPL
215288	2001 RE_{3}	—	September 8, 2001	Anderson Mesa	LONEOS	·	2.9 km	MPC · JPL
215289	2001 RF_{85}	—	September 11, 2001	Anderson Mesa	LONEOS	·	2.3 km	MPC · JPL
215290	2001 RA_{107}	—	September 12, 2001	Socorro	LINEAR	·	2.1 km	MPC · JPL
215291	2001 RM_{109}	—	September 12, 2001	Socorro	LINEAR	·	2.4 km	MPC · JPL
215292	2001 RD_{120}	—	September 12, 2001	Socorro	LINEAR	·	2.7 km	MPC · JPL
215293	2001 RN_{120}	—	September 12, 2001	Socorro	LINEAR	·	2.3 km	MPC · JPL
215294	2001 RO_{123}	—	September 12, 2001	Socorro	LINEAR	·	1.2 km	MPC · JPL
215295	2001 RR_{145}	—	September 8, 2001	Socorro	LINEAR	·	2.5 km	MPC · JPL
215296	2001 SY_{25}	—	September 16, 2001	Socorro	LINEAR	AGN	1.4 km	MPC · JPL
215297	2001 SG_{80}	—	September 20, 2001	Socorro	LINEAR	·	2.3 km	MPC · JPL
215298	2001 SC_{83}	—	September 20, 2001	Socorro	LINEAR	·	3.4 km	MPC · JPL
215299	2001 SC_{112}	—	September 20, 2001	Desert Eagle	W. K. Y. Yeung	·	2.8 km	MPC · JPL
215300	2001 SM_{115}	—	September 20, 2001	Desert Eagle	W. K. Y. Yeung	·	1.1 km	MPC · JPL

== 215301–215400 ==
back to top

Designation			Discovery			Properties		Ref
Permanent	Provisional	Named after	Date	Site	Discoverer(s)	Category	Diam.	Ref
215301	2001 SA_{134}	—	September 16, 2001	Socorro	LINEAR	·	2.9 km	MPC · JPL
215302	2001 SN_{135}	—	September 16, 2001	Socorro	LINEAR	AGN	1.7 km	MPC · JPL
215303	2001 SQ_{141}	—	September 16, 2001	Socorro	LINEAR	·	3.2 km	MPC · JPL
215304	2001 SG_{150}	—	September 17, 2001	Socorro	LINEAR	·	4.4 km	MPC · JPL
215305	2001 SD_{163}	—	September 17, 2001	Socorro	LINEAR	·	1.9 km	MPC · JPL
215306	2001 SW_{176}	—	September 16, 2001	Socorro	LINEAR	·	2.0 km	MPC · JPL
215307	2001 SS_{178}	—	September 17, 2001	Socorro	LINEAR	·	3.1 km	MPC · JPL
215308	2001 ST_{185}	—	September 19, 2001	Socorro	LINEAR	·	2.4 km	MPC · JPL
215309	2001 SB_{189}	—	September 19, 2001	Socorro	LINEAR	·	2.6 km	MPC · JPL
215310	2001 SW_{207}	—	September 19, 2001	Socorro	LINEAR	·	2.0 km	MPC · JPL
215311	2001 SC_{233}	—	September 19, 2001	Socorro	LINEAR	·	3.0 km	MPC · JPL
215312	2001 SF_{248}	—	September 19, 2001	Socorro	LINEAR	V	720 m	MPC · JPL
215313	2001 SR_{306}	—	September 20, 2001	Socorro	LINEAR	·	2.3 km	MPC · JPL
215314	2001 SA_{319}	—	September 21, 2001	Socorro	LINEAR	·	2.8 km	MPC · JPL
215315	2001 SC_{319}	—	September 21, 2001	Socorro	LINEAR	·	2.7 km	MPC · JPL
215316	2001 SQ_{341}	—	September 21, 2001	Palomar	NEAT	·	1.6 km	MPC · JPL
215317	2001 TV_{58}	—	October 13, 2001	Socorro	LINEAR	·	2.0 km	MPC · JPL
215318	2001 TQ_{93}	—	October 14, 2001	Socorro	LINEAR	HNS	2.0 km	MPC · JPL
215319	2001 TA_{119}	—	October 15, 2001	Socorro	LINEAR	L5	20 km	MPC · JPL
215320	2001 TS_{136}	—	October 14, 2001	Palomar	NEAT	·	2.2 km	MPC · JPL
215321	2001 TW_{138}	—	October 10, 2001	Palomar	NEAT	·	1.8 km	MPC · JPL
215322	2001 TT_{161}	—	October 11, 2001	Palomar	NEAT	(2076)	1.4 km	MPC · JPL
215323	2001 TW_{172}	—	October 13, 2001	Socorro	LINEAR	·	2.5 km	MPC · JPL
215324	2001 TP_{198}	—	October 11, 2001	Socorro	LINEAR	AGN	1.8 km	MPC · JPL
215325	2001 TG_{204}	—	October 11, 2001	Socorro	LINEAR	·	2.8 km	MPC · JPL
215326	2001 UV_{26}	—	October 17, 2001	Kitt Peak	Spacewatch	·	2.6 km	MPC · JPL
215327	2001 UW_{38}	—	October 17, 2001	Socorro	LINEAR	·	4.2 km	MPC · JPL
215328	2001 UN_{47}	—	October 17, 2001	Socorro	LINEAR	·	4.0 km	MPC · JPL
215329	2001 UT_{48}	—	October 17, 2001	Socorro	LINEAR	·	3.1 km	MPC · JPL
215330	2001 UD_{61}	—	October 17, 2001	Socorro	LINEAR	·	2.3 km	MPC · JPL
215331	2001 UW_{61}	—	October 17, 2001	Socorro	LINEAR	L5	11 km	MPC · JPL
215332	2001 UA_{116}	—	October 22, 2001	Socorro	LINEAR	KOR	2.4 km	MPC · JPL
215333	2001 UB_{148}	—	October 23, 2001	Socorro	LINEAR	·	5.0 km	MPC · JPL
215334	2001 UN_{165}	—	October 23, 2001	Palomar	NEAT	GEF	1.6 km	MPC · JPL
215335	2001 UF_{173}	—	October 18, 2001	Palomar	NEAT	NYS	1.8 km	MPC · JPL
215336	2001 UN_{178}	—	October 23, 2001	Palomar	NEAT	·	2.4 km	MPC · JPL
215337	2001 UT_{188}	—	October 17, 2001	Kitt Peak	Spacewatch	KOR	2.0 km	MPC · JPL
215338	2001 UL_{200}	—	October 19, 2001	Palomar	NEAT	·	2.5 km	MPC · JPL
215339	2001 UN_{203}	—	October 19, 2001	Palomar	NEAT	·	2.2 km	MPC · JPL
215340	2001 UX_{210}	—	October 21, 2001	Socorro	LINEAR	L5	12 km	MPC · JPL
215341	2001 UW_{224}	—	October 19, 2001	Kitt Peak	Spacewatch	TIR	3.4 km	MPC · JPL
215342	2001 US_{225}	—	October 16, 2001	Palomar	NEAT	HOF	3.4 km	MPC · JPL
215343	2001 VK_{7}	—	November 9, 2001	Socorro	LINEAR	·	2.4 km	MPC · JPL
215344	2001 VC_{22}	—	November 9, 2001	Socorro	LINEAR	·	3.7 km	MPC · JPL
215345	2001 VX_{90}	—	November 15, 2001	Socorro	LINEAR	·	3.8 km	MPC · JPL
215346	2001 VJ_{111}	—	November 12, 2001	Socorro	LINEAR	EOS	2.1 km	MPC · JPL
215347	2001 VO_{121}	—	November 15, 2001	Palomar	NEAT	·	3.2 km	MPC · JPL
215348	2001 VW_{122}	—	November 11, 2001	Anderson Mesa	LONEOS	·	7.6 km	MPC · JPL
215349	2001 VA_{128}	—	November 11, 2001	Apache Point	SDSS	L5	10 km	MPC · JPL
215350	2001 WJ_{31}	—	November 17, 2001	Socorro	LINEAR	·	4.3 km	MPC · JPL
215351	2001 WQ_{65}	—	November 20, 2001	Socorro	LINEAR	·	2.5 km	MPC · JPL
215352	2001 XZ_{87}	—	December 14, 2001	Desert Eagle	W. K. Y. Yeung	·	1.3 km	MPC · JPL
215353	2001 XD_{94}	—	December 10, 2001	Socorro	LINEAR	·	4.3 km	MPC · JPL
215354	2001 XM_{142}	—	December 14, 2001	Socorro	LINEAR	·	2.9 km	MPC · JPL
215355	2001 XY_{146}	—	December 14, 2001	Socorro	LINEAR	EOS	2.6 km	MPC · JPL
215356	2001 XJ_{147}	—	December 14, 2001	Socorro	LINEAR	·	3.0 km	MPC · JPL
215357	2001 XZ_{158}	—	December 14, 2001	Socorro	LINEAR	·	3.9 km	MPC · JPL
215358	2001 XR_{169}	—	December 14, 2001	Socorro	LINEAR	·	3.7 km	MPC · JPL
215359	2001 XX_{169}	—	December 14, 2001	Socorro	LINEAR	VER	5.2 km	MPC · JPL
215360	2001 XJ_{171}	—	December 14, 2001	Socorro	LINEAR	·	3.5 km	MPC · JPL
215361	2001 XX_{193}	—	December 14, 2001	Socorro	LINEAR	HYG	3.9 km	MPC · JPL
215362	2001 XL_{195}	—	December 14, 2001	Socorro	LINEAR	HNS	1.9 km	MPC · JPL
215363	2001 XH_{212}	—	December 11, 2001	Socorro	LINEAR	·	1.5 km	MPC · JPL
215364	2001 XW_{236}	—	December 15, 2001	Socorro	LINEAR	THM	2.6 km	MPC · JPL
215365	2001 XY_{249}	—	December 14, 2001	Socorro	LINEAR	·	5.1 km	MPC · JPL
215366	2001 XH_{256}	—	December 5, 2001	Haleakala	NEAT	·	2.7 km	MPC · JPL
215367	2001 XM_{256}	—	December 7, 2001	Socorro	LINEAR	·	1.9 km	MPC · JPL
215368	2001 YR_{34}	—	December 18, 2001	Socorro	LINEAR	NYS	1.7 km	MPC · JPL
215369	2001 YE_{35}	—	December 18, 2001	Socorro	LINEAR	·	2.9 km	MPC · JPL
215370	2001 YU_{64}	—	December 18, 2001	Socorro	LINEAR	·	3.3 km	MPC · JPL
215371	2001 YD_{102}	—	December 17, 2001	Socorro	LINEAR	·	2.6 km	MPC · JPL
215372	2002 AL_{39}	—	January 9, 2002	Socorro	LINEAR	·	1.0 km	MPC · JPL
215373	2002 AP_{43}	—	January 9, 2002	Socorro	LINEAR	·	3.9 km	MPC · JPL
215374	2002 AV_{64}	—	January 11, 2002	Socorro	LINEAR	·	1.5 km	MPC · JPL
215375	2002 AV_{73}	—	January 8, 2002	Socorro	LINEAR	THM	3.4 km	MPC · JPL
215376	2002 AO_{94}	—	January 8, 2002	Socorro	LINEAR	·	3.2 km	MPC · JPL
215377	2002 AZ_{106}	—	January 9, 2002	Socorro	LINEAR	3:2	6.6 km	MPC · JPL
215378	2002 AS_{115}	—	January 9, 2002	Socorro	LINEAR	·	5.5 km	MPC · JPL
215379	2002 AP_{142}	—	January 13, 2002	Socorro	LINEAR	·	1.3 km	MPC · JPL
215380	2002 CZ_{7}	—	February 2, 2002	Haleakala	NEAT	·	4.5 km	MPC · JPL
215381	2002 CJ_{22}	—	February 5, 2002	Palomar	NEAT	·	1.7 km	MPC · JPL
215382	2002 CE_{28}	—	February 6, 2002	Socorro	LINEAR	·	1.2 km	MPC · JPL
215383	2002 CF_{37}	—	February 7, 2002	Socorro	LINEAR	·	1.2 km	MPC · JPL
215384	2002 CT_{47}	—	February 3, 2002	Haleakala	NEAT	·	5.4 km	MPC · JPL
215385	2002 CN_{57}	—	February 7, 2002	Socorro	LINEAR	·	860 m	MPC · JPL
215386	2002 CR_{65}	—	February 6, 2002	Socorro	LINEAR	·	980 m	MPC · JPL
215387	2002 CC_{67}	—	February 7, 2002	Socorro	LINEAR	·	3.4 km	MPC · JPL
215388	2002 CG_{81}	—	February 7, 2002	Socorro	LINEAR	·	4.0 km	MPC · JPL
215389	2002 CG_{132}	—	February 7, 2002	Socorro	LINEAR	NEM	3.0 km	MPC · JPL
215390	2002 CE_{137}	—	February 8, 2002	Socorro	LINEAR	·	4.2 km	MPC · JPL
215391	2002 CA_{144}	—	February 9, 2002	Socorro	LINEAR	·	2.5 km	MPC · JPL
215392	2002 CF_{144}	—	February 9, 2002	Socorro	LINEAR	·	2.7 km	MPC · JPL
215393	2002 CH_{149}	—	February 10, 2002	Socorro	LINEAR	·	790 m	MPC · JPL
215394	2002 CH_{199}	—	February 10, 2002	Socorro	LINEAR	EOS	3.0 km	MPC · JPL
215395	2002 CL_{256}	—	February 4, 2002	Palomar	NEAT	·	6.7 km	MPC · JPL
215396	2002 CT_{258}	—	February 6, 2002	Palomar	NEAT	·	980 m	MPC · JPL
215397	2002 CT_{292}	—	February 11, 2002	Socorro	LINEAR	·	5.0 km	MPC · JPL
215398	2002 DH_{4}	—	February 23, 2002	Desert Moon	Stevens, B. L.	PHO	860 m	MPC · JPL
215399	2002 DT_{17}	—	February 20, 2002	Socorro	LINEAR	·	890 m	MPC · JPL
215400	2002 EJ_{17}	—	March 5, 2002	Kitt Peak	Spacewatch	·	1.9 km	MPC · JPL

== 215401–215500 ==
back to top

Designation			Discovery			Properties		Ref
Permanent	Provisional	Named after	Date	Site	Discoverer(s)	Category	Diam.	Ref
215401	2002 EW_{22}	—	March 10, 2002	Haleakala	NEAT	·	1.9 km	MPC · JPL
215402	2002 EO_{43}	—	March 12, 2002	Socorro	LINEAR	·	920 m	MPC · JPL
215403	2002 EE_{53}	—	March 13, 2002	Socorro	LINEAR	·	1.2 km	MPC · JPL
215404	2002 EK_{79}	—	March 10, 2002	Haleakala	NEAT	·	1.2 km	MPC · JPL
215405	2002 EY_{108}	—	March 9, 2002	Palomar	NEAT	·	1.1 km	MPC · JPL
215406	2002 EJ_{111}	—	March 9, 2002	Catalina	CSS	·	1.3 km	MPC · JPL
215407	2002 EK_{115}	—	March 10, 2002	Kitt Peak	Spacewatch	L4	13 km	MPC · JPL
215408	2002 ER_{129}	—	March 11, 2002	Kitt Peak	Spacewatch	·	950 m	MPC · JPL
215409	2002 EJ_{155}	—	March 5, 2002	Anderson Mesa	LONEOS	·	1 km	MPC · JPL
215410	2002 GN_{2}	—	April 4, 2002	Haleakala	NEAT	H	620 m	MPC · JPL
215411	2002 GB_{23}	—	April 15, 2002	Palomar	NEAT	·	2.9 km	MPC · JPL
215412	2002 GO_{45}	—	April 4, 2002	Haleakala	NEAT	·	4.9 km	MPC · JPL
215413	2002 GP_{51}	—	April 5, 2002	Palomar	NEAT	·	2.2 km	MPC · JPL
215414	2002 GL_{86}	—	April 10, 2002	Socorro	LINEAR	·	1.2 km	MPC · JPL
215415	2002 GX_{94}	—	April 9, 2002	Socorro	LINEAR	(2076)	970 m	MPC · JPL
215416	2002 GN_{100}	—	April 10, 2002	Socorro	LINEAR	·	1.3 km	MPC · JPL
215417	2002 GU_{103}	—	April 10, 2002	Socorro	LINEAR	·	1.1 km	MPC · JPL
215418	2002 GG_{117}	—	April 11, 2002	Socorro	LINEAR	(2076)	1.2 km	MPC · JPL
215419	2002 GM_{126}	—	April 12, 2002	Socorro	LINEAR	·	1.2 km	MPC · JPL
215420	2002 GN_{149}	—	April 14, 2002	Socorro	LINEAR	·	1.0 km	MPC · JPL
215421	2002 GO_{155}	—	April 13, 2002	Palomar	NEAT	·	1.1 km	MPC · JPL
215422	2002 GN_{175}	—	April 11, 2002	Socorro	LINEAR	·	1.3 km	MPC · JPL
215423 Winnecke	2002 GE_{178}	Winnecke	April 4, 2002	Palomar	M. Meyer	·	1.0 km	MPC · JPL
215424	2002 JE_{18}	—	May 7, 2002	Palomar	NEAT	·	1.1 km	MPC · JPL
215425	2002 JF_{31}	—	May 9, 2002	Socorro	LINEAR	V	870 m	MPC · JPL
215426	2002 JF_{45}	—	May 9, 2002	Socorro	LINEAR	·	1.2 km	MPC · JPL
215427	2002 JF_{46}	—	May 9, 2002	Socorro	LINEAR	·	1.2 km	MPC · JPL
215428	2002 JB_{61}	—	May 10, 2002	Reedy Creek	J. Broughton	·	2.6 km	MPC · JPL
215429	2002 JZ_{74}	—	May 9, 2002	Socorro	LINEAR	·	1.4 km	MPC · JPL
215430	2002 JJ_{84}	—	May 11, 2002	Socorro	LINEAR	·	900 m	MPC · JPL
215431	2002 JN_{92}	—	May 11, 2002	Socorro	LINEAR	·	3.1 km	MPC · JPL
215432	2002 JL_{129}	—	May 8, 2002	Desert Eagle	W. K. Y. Yeung	·	1.1 km	MPC · JPL
215433	2002 JA_{140}	—	May 10, 2002	Palomar	NEAT	·	1.4 km	MPC · JPL
215434	2002 KD_{10}	—	May 16, 2002	Socorro	LINEAR	·	1.3 km	MPC · JPL
215435	2002 LW_{8}	—	June 5, 2002	Socorro	LINEAR	·	1.2 km	MPC · JPL
215436	2002 LP_{11}	—	June 5, 2002	Socorro	LINEAR	ERI	2.4 km	MPC · JPL
215437	2002 LC_{16}	—	June 6, 2002	Socorro	LINEAR	·	1.5 km	MPC · JPL
215438	2002 LL_{25}	—	June 3, 2002	Socorro	LINEAR	·	4.1 km	MPC · JPL
215439	2002 LT_{27}	—	June 9, 2002	Socorro	LINEAR	·	1.2 km	MPC · JPL
215440	2002 LD_{47}	—	June 15, 2002	Kingsnake	J. V. McClusky	·	1.3 km	MPC · JPL
215441	2002 LK_{62}	—	June 12, 2002	Palomar	NEAT	·	1.3 km	MPC · JPL
215442	2002 MQ_{3}	—	June 30, 2002	Socorro	LINEAR	ATE +1km · slow	1.1 km	MPC · JPL
215443	2002 NS_{34}	—	July 9, 2002	Socorro	LINEAR	·	2.3 km	MPC · JPL
215444	2002 NU_{36}	—	July 9, 2002	Socorro	LINEAR	·	1.6 km	MPC · JPL
215445	2002 ND_{40}	—	July 14, 2002	Palomar	NEAT	·	1.3 km	MPC · JPL
215446	2002 NV_{40}	—	July 14, 2002	Palomar	NEAT	MAS	880 m	MPC · JPL
215447	2002 NR_{45}	—	July 13, 2002	Palomar	NEAT	·	2.0 km	MPC · JPL
215448	2002 NL_{62}	—	July 3, 2002	Palomar	NEAT	(6769)	1.2 km	MPC · JPL
215449	2002 OW_{8}	—	July 21, 2002	Palomar	NEAT	·	2.1 km	MPC · JPL
215450	2002 OC_{16}	—	July 18, 2002	Socorro	LINEAR	·	2.1 km	MPC · JPL
215451	2002 OH_{19}	—	July 24, 2002	Haleakala	NEAT	PHO	2.4 km	MPC · JPL
215452	2002 OQ_{20}	—	July 21, 2002	Palomar	NEAT	·	1.6 km	MPC · JPL
215453	2002 PG_{11}	—	August 5, 2002	Campo Imperatore	CINEOS	·	1.6 km	MPC · JPL
215454	2002 PQ_{66}	—	August 6, 2002	Palomar	NEAT	·	1.8 km	MPC · JPL
215455	2002 PY_{87}	—	August 12, 2002	Socorro	LINEAR	·	1.4 km	MPC · JPL
215456	2002 PZ_{136}	—	August 15, 2002	Palomar	NEAT	·	1.7 km	MPC · JPL
215457	2002 PQ_{139}	—	August 13, 2002	Socorro	LINEAR	PHO	1.5 km	MPC · JPL
215458 Yucun	2002 PJ_{178}	Yucun	August 15, 2002	Palomar	NEAT	·	2.0 km	MPC · JPL
215459	2002 QL_{5}	—	August 16, 2002	Palomar	NEAT	ERI	2.3 km	MPC · JPL
215460	2002 QO_{8}	—	August 19, 2002	Palomar	NEAT	·	1.8 km	MPC · JPL
215461	2002 QB_{30}	—	August 29, 2002	Palomar	NEAT	·	1.1 km	MPC · JPL
215462	2002 QF_{63}	—	August 17, 2002	Palomar	NEAT	·	940 m	MPC · JPL
215463 Jobse	2002 QQ_{66}	Jobse	August 30, 2002	Palomar	NEAT	MAS	970 m	MPC · JPL
215464	2002 QQ_{79}	—	August 28, 2002	Palomar	NEAT	·	2.1 km	MPC · JPL
215465	2002 QE_{90}	—	August 19, 2002	Palomar	NEAT	·	1.5 km	MPC · JPL
215466	2002 QD_{98}	—	August 18, 2002	Palomar	NEAT	NYS	1.1 km	MPC · JPL
215467	2002 QK_{100}	—	August 19, 2002	Palomar	NEAT	·	1.1 km	MPC · JPL
215468	2002 QD_{103}	—	August 30, 2002	Palomar	NEAT	·	1.3 km	MPC · JPL
215469	2002 RM_{10}	—	September 4, 2002	Palomar	NEAT	HNS	1.7 km	MPC · JPL
215470	2002 RO_{32}	—	September 4, 2002	Anderson Mesa	LONEOS	NYS	1.7 km	MPC · JPL
215471	2002 RB_{34}	—	September 4, 2002	Anderson Mesa	LONEOS	·	4.7 km	MPC · JPL
215472	2002 RX_{40}	—	September 5, 2002	Socorro	LINEAR	NYS	1.9 km	MPC · JPL
215473	2002 RZ_{50}	—	September 5, 2002	Socorro	LINEAR	·	2.1 km	MPC · JPL
215474	2002 RD_{66}	—	September 4, 2002	Anderson Mesa	LONEOS	H	920 m	MPC · JPL
215475	2002 RD_{122}	—	September 8, 2002	Haleakala	NEAT	·	1.5 km	MPC · JPL
215476	2002 RP_{134}	—	September 10, 2002	Palomar	NEAT	·	1.6 km	MPC · JPL
215477	2002 RK_{163}	—	September 12, 2002	Palomar	NEAT	NYS	1.4 km	MPC · JPL
215478	2002 RC_{192}	—	September 12, 2002	Palomar	NEAT	V	920 m	MPC · JPL
215479	2002 RK_{216}	—	September 13, 2002	Anderson Mesa	LONEOS	LUT	5.7 km	MPC · JPL
215480	2002 RR_{230}	—	September 15, 2002	Palomar	NEAT	·	1.3 km	MPC · JPL
215481	2002 RW_{279}	—	September 14, 2002	Palomar	NEAT	·	1.2 km	MPC · JPL
215482	2002 TU_{16}	—	October 2, 2002	Socorro	LINEAR	·	2.6 km	MPC · JPL
215483	2002 TA_{33}	—	October 2, 2002	Socorro	LINEAR	·	1.5 km	MPC · JPL
215484	2002 TS_{34}	—	October 2, 2002	Socorro	LINEAR	NYS	1.3 km	MPC · JPL
215485	2002 TB_{37}	—	October 2, 2002	Socorro	LINEAR	·	1.5 km	MPC · JPL
215486	2002 TH_{43}	—	October 2, 2002	Socorro	LINEAR	(5)	1.7 km	MPC · JPL
215487	2002 TC_{52}	—	October 2, 2002	Socorro	LINEAR	·	3.6 km	MPC · JPL
215488	2002 TV_{54}	—	October 2, 2002	Socorro	LINEAR	·	2.1 km	MPC · JPL
215489	2002 TG_{57}	—	October 3, 2002	Socorro	LINEAR	·	1.6 km	MPC · JPL
215490	2002 TY_{67}	—	October 5, 2002	Socorro	LINEAR	·	2.2 km	MPC · JPL
215491	2002 TY_{116}	—	October 3, 2002	Palomar	NEAT	·	6.8 km	MPC · JPL
215492	2002 TE_{122}	—	October 3, 2002	Campo Imperatore	CINEOS	·	2.5 km	MPC · JPL
215493	2002 TR_{143}	—	October 4, 2002	Socorro	LINEAR	·	2.0 km	MPC · JPL
215494	2002 TH_{157}	—	October 5, 2002	Palomar	NEAT	·	2.8 km	MPC · JPL
215495	2002 TF_{161}	—	October 5, 2002	Palomar	NEAT	·	2.2 km	MPC · JPL
215496	2002 TT_{164}	—	October 5, 2002	Palomar	NEAT	·	2.2 km	MPC · JPL
215497	2002 TN_{214}	—	October 4, 2002	Socorro	LINEAR	·	2.2 km	MPC · JPL
215498	2002 TK_{226}	—	October 8, 2002	Anderson Mesa	LONEOS	·	5.1 km	MPC · JPL
215499	2002 TP_{230}	—	October 7, 2002	Palomar	NEAT	·	3.2 km	MPC · JPL
215500	2002 TN_{251}	—	October 7, 2002	Socorro	LINEAR	EUN	2.4 km	MPC · JPL

== 215501–215600 ==
back to top

Designation			Discovery			Properties		Ref
Permanent	Provisional	Named after	Date	Site	Discoverer(s)	Category	Diam.	Ref
215501	2002 TF_{257}	—	October 9, 2002	Socorro	LINEAR	EUN	1.8 km	MPC · JPL
215502	2002 TJ_{300}	—	October 15, 2002	Palomar	NEAT	·	1.2 km	MPC · JPL
215503	2002 TE_{312}	—	October 4, 2002	Apache Point	SDSS	·	2.8 km	MPC · JPL
215504	2002 TZ_{329}	—	October 5, 2002	Apache Point	SDSS	·	1.6 km	MPC · JPL
215505	2002 TZ_{363}	—	October 10, 2002	Apache Point	SDSS	·	1.8 km	MPC · JPL
215506	2002 TY_{371}	—	October 10, 2002	Apache Point	SDSS	·	3.6 km	MPC · JPL
215507	2002 TJ_{382}	—	October 5, 2002	Apache Point	SDSS	RAF	940 m	MPC · JPL
215508	2002 TK_{382}	—	October 9, 2002	Palomar	NEAT	·	3.1 km	MPC · JPL
215509	2002 TL_{382}	—	October 15, 2002	Palomar	NEAT	·	2.1 km	MPC · JPL
215510	2002 UN_{2}	—	October 28, 2002	Socorro	LINEAR	EUP	6.9 km	MPC · JPL
215511	2002 UY_{3}	—	October 26, 2002	Haleakala	NEAT	·	2.5 km	MPC · JPL
215512	2002 UF_{14}	—	October 29, 2002	Palomar	NEAT	·	1.8 km	MPC · JPL
215513	2002 UP_{19}	—	October 30, 2002	Haleakala	NEAT	·	3.4 km	MPC · JPL
215514	2002 UC_{50}	—	October 31, 2002	Socorro	LINEAR	·	1.9 km	MPC · JPL
215515	2002 UR_{53}	—	October 29, 2002	Apache Point	SDSS	·	2.6 km	MPC · JPL
215516	2002 UQ_{64}	—	October 30, 2002	Apache Point	SDSS	·	1.9 km	MPC · JPL
215517	2002 UZ_{74}	—	October 18, 2002	Palomar	NEAT	L5	10 km	MPC · JPL
215518	2002 UY_{76}	—	October 31, 2002	Palomar	NEAT	·	2.3 km	MPC · JPL
215519	2002 VD_{15}	—	November 5, 2002	Haleakala	NEAT	H	780 m	MPC · JPL
215520	2002 VG_{29}	—	November 5, 2002	Socorro	LINEAR	·	2.1 km	MPC · JPL
215521	2002 VJ_{35}	—	November 5, 2002	Socorro	LINEAR	·	2.0 km	MPC · JPL
215522	2002 VZ_{56}	—	November 6, 2002	Kitt Peak	Spacewatch	·	2.4 km	MPC · JPL
215523	2002 VB_{59}	—	November 6, 2002	Needville	Needville	·	2.2 km	MPC · JPL
215524	2002 VZ_{71}	—	November 7, 2002	Socorro	LINEAR	·	1.7 km	MPC · JPL
215525	2002 VU_{72}	—	November 7, 2002	Socorro	LINEAR	(5)	1.5 km	MPC · JPL
215526	2002 VV_{83}	—	November 7, 2002	Socorro	LINEAR	EUN	1.9 km	MPC · JPL
215527	2002 VT_{89}	—	November 8, 2002	Socorro	LINEAR	GEF	1.9 km	MPC · JPL
215528	2002 VQ_{91}	—	November 11, 2002	Socorro	LINEAR	·	1.8 km	MPC · JPL
215529	2002 VK_{101}	—	November 11, 2002	Socorro	LINEAR	·	4.2 km	MPC · JPL
215530	2002 VE_{103}	—	November 12, 2002	Socorro	LINEAR	L5	19 km	MPC · JPL
215531	2002 VS_{105}	—	November 12, 2002	Socorro	LINEAR	·	2.0 km	MPC · JPL
215532	2002 VW_{105}	—	November 12, 2002	Socorro	LINEAR	·	2.6 km	MPC · JPL
215533	2002 VG_{111}	—	November 13, 2002	Socorro	LINEAR	·	2.5 km	MPC · JPL
215534	2002 VV_{113}	—	November 13, 2002	Palomar	NEAT	·	2.4 km	MPC · JPL
215535	2002 VF_{128}	—	November 14, 2002	Socorro	LINEAR	·	1.4 km	MPC · JPL
215536	2002 WQ_{3}	—	November 24, 2002	Palomar	NEAT	·	1.7 km	MPC · JPL
215537	2002 WQ_{6}	—	November 24, 2002	Palomar	NEAT	·	5.2 km	MPC · JPL
215538	2002 WU_{10}	—	November 25, 2002	Palomar	NEAT	·	2.8 km	MPC · JPL
215539	2002 WN_{12}	—	November 27, 2002	Anderson Mesa	LONEOS	·	2.9 km	MPC · JPL
215540	2002 WL_{13}	—	November 30, 2002	Socorro	LINEAR	·	4.6 km	MPC · JPL
215541	2002 WU_{16}	—	November 28, 2002	Haleakala	NEAT	MAR	1.8 km	MPC · JPL
215542	2002 WT_{25}	—	November 16, 2002	Palomar	NEAT	L5	16 km	MPC · JPL
215543	2002 XD	—	December 1, 2002	Socorro	LINEAR	H	990 m	MPC · JPL
215544	2002 XH_{18}	—	December 5, 2002	Socorro	LINEAR	·	1.7 km	MPC · JPL
215545	2002 XB_{25}	—	December 5, 2002	Socorro	LINEAR	·	2.3 km	MPC · JPL
215546	2002 XF_{51}	—	December 10, 2002	Socorro	LINEAR	·	1.9 km	MPC · JPL
215547	2002 XE_{56}	—	December 8, 2002	Haleakala	NEAT	·	1.7 km	MPC · JPL
215548	2002 XA_{64}	—	December 11, 2002	Socorro	LINEAR	·	1.1 km	MPC · JPL
215549	2002 XQ_{85}	—	December 11, 2002	Socorro	LINEAR	(5)	2.2 km	MPC · JPL
215550	2002 XD_{104}	—	December 5, 2002	Socorro	LINEAR	·	2.1 km	MPC · JPL
215551	2002 YR_{36}	—	December 27, 2002	Palomar	NEAT	L5	10 km	MPC · JPL
215552	2003 AJ_{18}	—	January 5, 2003	Anderson Mesa	LONEOS	·	3.1 km	MPC · JPL
215553	2003 AB_{42}	—	January 7, 2003	Socorro	LINEAR	·	2.8 km	MPC · JPL
215554	2003 AX_{51}	—	January 5, 2003	Socorro	LINEAR	·	3.1 km	MPC · JPL
215555	2003 AK_{63}	—	January 8, 2003	Socorro	LINEAR	THM	3.3 km	MPC · JPL
215556	2003 AD_{85}	—	January 7, 2003	Socorro	LINEAR	·	4.2 km	MPC · JPL
215557	2003 BJ_{10}	—	January 26, 2003	Anderson Mesa	LONEOS	·	3.9 km	MPC · JPL
215558	2003 BJ_{57}	—	January 27, 2003	Socorro	LINEAR	·	2.9 km	MPC · JPL
215559	2003 BL_{76}	—	January 29, 2003	Palomar	NEAT	EOS	2.6 km	MPC · JPL
215560	2003 BM_{88}	—	January 27, 2003	Socorro	LINEAR	EOS	2.6 km	MPC · JPL
215561	2003 CG_{18}	—	February 8, 2003	Socorro	LINEAR	·	2.3 km	MPC · JPL
215562	2003 CN_{20}	—	February 9, 2003	Palomar	NEAT	·	3.3 km	MPC · JPL
215563	2003 DZ_{17}	—	February 19, 2003	Palomar	NEAT	·	2.9 km	MPC · JPL
215564	2003 DG_{24}	—	February 28, 2003	Socorro	LINEAR	·	5.3 km	MPC · JPL
215565	2003 EO_{26}	—	March 6, 2003	Anderson Mesa	LONEOS	·	4.0 km	MPC · JPL
215566	2003 EG_{40}	—	March 8, 2003	Socorro	LINEAR	·	5.2 km	MPC · JPL
215567	2003 EF_{62}	—	March 10, 2003	Kitt Peak	Spacewatch	EOS	2.9 km	MPC · JPL
215568	2003 FK_{25}	—	March 24, 2003	Kitt Peak	Spacewatch	·	2.2 km	MPC · JPL
215569	2003 FM_{25}	—	March 24, 2003	Kitt Peak	Spacewatch	·	3.7 km	MPC · JPL
215570	2003 FK_{48}	—	March 24, 2003	Kitt Peak	Spacewatch	·	5.1 km	MPC · JPL
215571	2003 FK_{49}	—	March 24, 2003	Haleakala	NEAT	·	5.5 km	MPC · JPL
215572	2003 FE_{54}	—	March 25, 2003	Palomar	NEAT	LIX	4.8 km	MPC · JPL
215573	2003 FN_{61}	—	March 26, 2003	Palomar	NEAT	HYG	3.9 km	MPC · JPL
215574	2003 FF_{72}	—	March 26, 2003	Palomar	NEAT	THB	4.2 km	MPC · JPL
215575	2003 FU_{74}	—	March 26, 2003	Palomar	NEAT	·	4.7 km	MPC · JPL
215576	2003 FK_{75}	—	March 27, 2003	Palomar	NEAT	·	5.3 km	MPC · JPL
215577	2003 FL_{81}	—	March 27, 2003	Socorro	LINEAR	·	5.3 km	MPC · JPL
215578	2003 FH_{82}	—	March 27, 2003	Palomar	NEAT	EOS	3.4 km	MPC · JPL
215579	2003 FY_{88}	—	March 29, 2003	Kitt Peak	Spacewatch	EOS	2.9 km	MPC · JPL
215580	2003 FP_{96}	—	March 30, 2003	Kitt Peak	Spacewatch	·	4.5 km	MPC · JPL
215581	2003 FP_{127}	—	March 29, 2003	Kitt Peak	Spacewatch	·	4.8 km	MPC · JPL
215582	2003 GS_{10}	—	April 3, 2003	Haleakala	NEAT	·	5.0 km	MPC · JPL
215583	2003 GL_{29}	—	April 7, 2003	Socorro	LINEAR	THB	4.2 km	MPC · JPL
215584	2003 GF_{36}	—	April 5, 2003	Anderson Mesa	LONEOS	·	4.4 km	MPC · JPL
215585	2003 GO_{39}	—	April 7, 2003	Kitt Peak	Spacewatch	·	5.0 km	MPC · JPL
215586	2003 GB_{43}	—	April 9, 2003	Palomar	NEAT	·	5.1 km	MPC · JPL
215587	2003 GO_{44}	—	April 9, 2003	Haleakala	NEAT	·	7.0 km	MPC · JPL
215588	2003 HF_{2}	—	April 24, 2003	Anderson Mesa	LONEOS	APO · PHA	490 m	MPC · JPL
215589	2003 JO_{7}	—	May 2, 2003	Socorro	LINEAR	·	5.3 km	MPC · JPL
215590	2003 KY_{10}	—	May 23, 2003	Kitt Peak	Spacewatch	·	4.8 km	MPC · JPL
215591	2003 OH	—	July 18, 2003	Siding Spring	R. H. McNaught	·	1.3 km	MPC · JPL
215592 Normarose	2003 PR_{4}	Normarose	August 3, 2003	Norma Rose	Riffle, J., W. K. Y. Yeung	·	3.2 km	MPC · JPL
215593	2003 QG_{9}	—	August 20, 2003	Campo Imperatore	CINEOS	·	3.3 km	MPC · JPL
215594	2003 QQ_{27}	—	August 23, 2003	Socorro	LINEAR	·	1.0 km	MPC · JPL
215595	2003 QZ_{35}	—	August 22, 2003	Socorro	LINEAR	·	1.3 km	MPC · JPL
215596	2003 QT_{41}	—	August 22, 2003	Socorro	LINEAR	(2076)	1.3 km	MPC · JPL
215597	2003 QZ_{76}	—	August 24, 2003	Socorro	LINEAR	·	1.2 km	MPC · JPL
215598	2003 QE_{111}	—	August 31, 2003	Socorro	LINEAR	·	1.4 km	MPC · JPL
215599	2003 RN_{1}	—	September 2, 2003	Reedy Creek	J. Broughton	·	1.5 km	MPC · JPL
215600	2003 RM_{13}	—	September 15, 2003	Palomar	NEAT	·	1.8 km	MPC · JPL

== 215601–215700 ==
back to top

Designation			Discovery			Properties		Ref
Permanent	Provisional	Named after	Date	Site	Discoverer(s)	Category	Diam.	Ref
215601	2003 RE_{14}	—	September 15, 2003	Haleakala	NEAT	·	1.2 km	MPC · JPL
215602	2003 RO_{20}	—	September 15, 2003	Anderson Mesa	LONEOS	·	860 m	MPC · JPL
215603	2003 SH_{13}	—	September 16, 2003	Kitt Peak	Spacewatch	·	1.3 km	MPC · JPL
215604	2003 SY_{14}	—	September 17, 2003	Kitt Peak	Spacewatch	·	1.0 km	MPC · JPL
215605	2003 SU_{29}	—	September 18, 2003	Palomar	NEAT	·	1.5 km	MPC · JPL
215606	2003 SF_{36}	—	September 17, 2003	Kleť	J. Tichá, M. Tichý	·	1.3 km	MPC · JPL
215607	2003 SD_{38}	—	September 16, 2003	Palomar	NEAT	·	3.7 km	MPC · JPL
215608	2003 SX_{60}	—	September 17, 2003	Kitt Peak	Spacewatch	·	1.7 km	MPC · JPL
215609	2003 SL_{67}	—	September 19, 2003	Socorro	LINEAR	·	820 m	MPC · JPL
215610	2003 SA_{83}	—	September 18, 2003	Kitt Peak	Spacewatch	·	1.1 km	MPC · JPL
215611	2003 SN_{90}	—	September 18, 2003	Socorro	LINEAR	·	1.1 km	MPC · JPL
215612	2003 SS_{96}	—	September 19, 2003	Socorro	LINEAR	·	890 m	MPC · JPL
215613	2003 SW_{110}	—	September 20, 2003	Palomar	NEAT	·	1.3 km	MPC · JPL
215614	2003 SW_{121}	—	September 17, 2003	Haleakala	NEAT	·	990 m	MPC · JPL
215615	2003 SH_{125}	—	September 19, 2003	Palomar	NEAT	·	1.2 km	MPC · JPL
215616	2003 SP_{125}	—	September 19, 2003	Socorro	LINEAR	·	1.0 km	MPC · JPL
215617	2003 SW_{128}	—	September 20, 2003	Palomar	NEAT	·	920 m	MPC · JPL
215618	2003 SB_{165}	—	September 20, 2003	Anderson Mesa	LONEOS	·	1.3 km	MPC · JPL
215619	2003 SQ_{168}	—	September 23, 2003	Haleakala	NEAT	·	1.1 km	MPC · JPL
215620	2003 SN_{213}	—	September 26, 2003	Socorro	LINEAR	·	1.0 km	MPC · JPL
215621	2003 SA_{214}	—	September 26, 2003	Desert Eagle	W. K. Y. Yeung	·	1.4 km	MPC · JPL
215622	2003 SJ_{223}	—	September 29, 2003	Desert Eagle	W. K. Y. Yeung	·	1.2 km	MPC · JPL
215623	2003 SL_{229}	—	September 27, 2003	Kitt Peak	Spacewatch	·	3.0 km	MPC · JPL
215624	2003 SF_{235}	—	September 26, 2003	Kleť	Kleť	EOS	3.6 km	MPC · JPL
215625	2003 SX_{250}	—	September 26, 2003	Socorro	LINEAR	·	1.5 km	MPC · JPL
215626	2003 SF_{258}	—	September 28, 2003	Kitt Peak	Spacewatch	·	1.0 km	MPC · JPL
215627	2003 SV_{262}	—	September 28, 2003	Socorro	LINEAR	·	960 m	MPC · JPL
215628	2003 SP_{271}	—	September 25, 2003	Haleakala	NEAT	·	1.3 km	MPC · JPL
215629	2003 SA_{289}	—	September 28, 2003	Socorro	LINEAR	·	1.8 km	MPC · JPL
215630	2003 SZ_{289}	—	September 28, 2003	Anderson Mesa	LONEOS	·	3.7 km	MPC · JPL
215631	2003 SW_{308}	—	September 30, 2003	Anderson Mesa	LONEOS	·	1.2 km	MPC · JPL
215632	2003 SV_{318}	—	September 18, 2003	Palomar	NEAT	·	3.1 km	MPC · JPL
215633	2003 ST_{321}	—	September 22, 2003	Palomar	NEAT	V	940 m	MPC · JPL
215634	2003 SO_{339}	—	September 26, 2003	Apache Point	SDSS	V	870 m	MPC · JPL
215635	2003 TY_{4}	—	October 1, 2003	Kitt Peak	Spacewatch	·	1.0 km	MPC · JPL
215636	2003 TP_{16}	—	October 15, 2003	Anderson Mesa	LONEOS	·	1.9 km	MPC · JPL
215637	2003 TG_{41}	—	October 2, 2003	Kitt Peak	Spacewatch	·	1.3 km	MPC · JPL
215638	2003 TW_{49}	—	October 3, 2003	Haleakala	NEAT	·	5.7 km	MPC · JPL
215639	2003 TW_{58}	—	October 15, 2003	Anderson Mesa	LONEOS	·	1.8 km	MPC · JPL
215640	2003 UP_{14}	—	October 16, 2003	Kitt Peak	Spacewatch	V	870 m	MPC · JPL
215641	2003 UJ_{24}	—	October 21, 2003	Kitt Peak	Spacewatch	·	1.0 km	MPC · JPL
215642	2003 UB_{26}	—	October 23, 2003	Anderson Mesa	LONEOS	·	1.4 km	MPC · JPL
215643	2003 UJ_{27}	—	October 23, 2003	Goodricke-Pigott	R. A. Tucker	·	1.1 km	MPC · JPL
215644	2003 UR_{27}	—	October 22, 2003	Goodricke-Pigott	R. A. Tucker	·	1.8 km	MPC · JPL
215645	2003 UN_{42}	—	October 17, 2003	Kitt Peak	Spacewatch	·	1.2 km	MPC · JPL
215646	2003 US_{63}	—	October 16, 2003	Palomar	NEAT	·	870 m	MPC · JPL
215647	2003 UN_{71}	—	October 19, 2003	Kitt Peak	Spacewatch	V	800 m	MPC · JPL
215648	2003 UF_{78}	—	October 17, 2003	Anderson Mesa	LONEOS	·	1.6 km	MPC · JPL
215649	2003 UT_{103}	—	October 20, 2003	Palomar	NEAT	·	1.9 km	MPC · JPL
215650	2003 UU_{107}	—	October 19, 2003	Palomar	NEAT	·	5.9 km	MPC · JPL
215651	2003 UT_{110}	—	October 22, 2003	Kitt Peak	Spacewatch	·	1.6 km	MPC · JPL
215652	2003 UE_{116}	—	October 21, 2003	Socorro	LINEAR	·	770 m	MPC · JPL
215653	2003 UM_{121}	—	October 19, 2003	Kitt Peak	Spacewatch	(2076)	1.6 km	MPC · JPL
215654	2003 UK_{141}	—	October 18, 2003	Anderson Mesa	LONEOS	·	1.7 km	MPC · JPL
215655	2003 UJ_{156}	—	October 20, 2003	Socorro	LINEAR	HOF	3.5 km	MPC · JPL
215656	2003 UD_{159}	—	October 20, 2003	Kitt Peak	Spacewatch	MAS	1.1 km	MPC · JPL
215657	2003 UT_{162}	—	October 21, 2003	Socorro	LINEAR	V	910 m	MPC · JPL
215658	2003 UK_{164}	—	October 21, 2003	Socorro	LINEAR	·	2.5 km	MPC · JPL
215659	2003 UY_{164}	—	October 21, 2003	Palomar	NEAT	·	2.5 km	MPC · JPL
215660	2003 UO_{178}	—	October 21, 2003	Palomar	NEAT	EOS	3.0 km	MPC · JPL
215661	2003 UZ_{179}	—	October 21, 2003	Socorro	LINEAR	·	1.2 km	MPC · JPL
215662	2003 UG_{188}	—	October 22, 2003	Socorro	LINEAR	·	2.4 km	MPC · JPL
215663	2003 UX_{210}	—	October 23, 2003	Kitt Peak	Spacewatch	·	2.0 km	MPC · JPL
215664	2003 UL_{214}	—	October 24, 2003	Haleakala	NEAT	·	1.4 km	MPC · JPL
215665	2003 UJ_{228}	—	October 23, 2003	Anderson Mesa	LONEOS	·	1.2 km	MPC · JPL
215666	2003 UO_{242}	—	October 24, 2003	Socorro	LINEAR	·	780 m	MPC · JPL
215667	2003 UX_{261}	—	October 26, 2003	Anderson Mesa	LONEOS	PHO	1.9 km	MPC · JPL
215668	2003 UG_{266}	—	October 28, 2003	Socorro	LINEAR	·	1.1 km	MPC · JPL
215669	2003 UV_{274}	—	October 30, 2003	Haleakala	NEAT	·	1.4 km	MPC · JPL
215670	2003 UO_{277}	—	October 25, 2003	Socorro	LINEAR	NYS ·	2.3 km	MPC · JPL
215671	2003 UB_{279}	—	October 26, 2003	Kitt Peak	Spacewatch	·	1.8 km	MPC · JPL
215672	2003 UU_{284}	—	October 21, 2003	Palomar	NEAT	·	2.9 km	MPC · JPL
215673	2003 UO_{379}	—	October 22, 2003	Apache Point	SDSS	·	940 m	MPC · JPL
215674	2003 UJ_{381}	—	October 22, 2003	Apache Point	SDSS	·	1.9 km	MPC · JPL
215675	2003 UF_{405}	—	October 23, 2003	Apache Point	SDSS	·	1.3 km	MPC · JPL
215676	2003 VJ_{11}	—	November 15, 2003	Palomar	NEAT	·	1.6 km	MPC · JPL
215677	2003 WN	—	November 16, 2003	Catalina	CSS	·	5.4 km	MPC · JPL
215678	2003 WR	—	November 16, 2003	Catalina	CSS	(2076)	1.1 km	MPC · JPL
215679	2003 WL_{59}	—	November 18, 2003	Kitt Peak	Spacewatch	·	1.0 km	MPC · JPL
215680	2003 WS_{85}	—	November 20, 2003	Palomar	NEAT	·	1.2 km	MPC · JPL
215681	2003 WH_{147}	—	November 23, 2003	Kitt Peak	Spacewatch	PHO	1.9 km	MPC · JPL
215682	2003 WD_{155}	—	November 26, 2003	Kitt Peak	Spacewatch	·	2.1 km	MPC · JPL
215683	2003 WB_{156}	—	November 29, 2003	Socorro	LINEAR	·	1.8 km	MPC · JPL
215684	2003 WR_{158}	—	November 28, 2003	Kitt Peak	Spacewatch	MAS	970 m	MPC · JPL
215685 Cherylalexander	2003 WK_{185}	Cherylalexander	November 21, 2003	Kitt Peak	M. W. Buie	·	2.7 km	MPC · JPL
215686	2003 XG_{43}	—	December 15, 2003	Kitt Peak	Spacewatch	·	1.9 km	MPC · JPL
215687	2003 YP_{12}	—	December 17, 2003	Anderson Mesa	LONEOS	·	3.2 km	MPC · JPL
215688	2003 YC_{45}	—	December 20, 2003	Socorro	LINEAR	·	5.7 km	MPC · JPL
215689	2003 YT_{51}	—	December 18, 2003	Socorro	LINEAR	V	1.0 km	MPC · JPL
215690	2003 YM_{54}	—	December 19, 2003	Kitt Peak	Spacewatch	·	1.9 km	MPC · JPL
215691	2003 YT_{56}	—	December 19, 2003	Socorro	LINEAR	·	880 m	MPC · JPL
215692	2003 YK_{68}	—	December 19, 2003	Socorro	LINEAR	(5)	1.8 km	MPC · JPL
215693	2003 YC_{69}	—	December 20, 2003	Socorro	LINEAR	·	1.8 km	MPC · JPL
215694	2003 YD_{78}	—	December 18, 2003	Socorro	LINEAR	V	800 m	MPC · JPL
215695	2003 YU_{84}	—	December 19, 2003	Kitt Peak	Spacewatch	·	1.6 km	MPC · JPL
215696	2003 YX_{85}	—	December 19, 2003	Socorro	LINEAR	·	1.6 km	MPC · JPL
215697	2003 YM_{102}	—	December 19, 2003	Socorro	LINEAR	NYS	1.6 km	MPC · JPL
215698	2003 YE_{117}	—	December 27, 2003	Socorro	LINEAR	·	1.2 km	MPC · JPL
215699	2003 YH_{117}	—	December 27, 2003	Kitt Peak	Spacewatch	·	1.5 km	MPC · JPL
215700	2003 YE_{120}	—	December 27, 2003	Socorro	LINEAR	·	2.2 km	MPC · JPL

== 215701–215800 ==
back to top

Designation			Discovery			Properties		Ref
Permanent	Provisional	Named after	Date	Site	Discoverer(s)	Category	Diam.	Ref
215701	2003 YD_{121}	—	December 27, 2003	Socorro	LINEAR	·	6.7 km	MPC · JPL
215702	2003 YJ_{122}	—	December 26, 2003	Pla D'Arguines	D'Arguines, Pla	·	820 m	MPC · JPL
215703	2003 YK_{129}	—	December 27, 2003	Socorro	LINEAR	EUN	2.3 km	MPC · JPL
215704	2004 AJ_{1}	—	January 12, 2004	Palomar	NEAT	·	3.2 km	MPC · JPL
215705	2004 AR_{7}	—	January 13, 2004	Anderson Mesa	LONEOS	·	1.5 km	MPC · JPL
215706	2004 AP_{10}	—	January 13, 2004	Anderson Mesa	LONEOS	·	2.2 km	MPC · JPL
215707	2004 AN_{24}	—	January 15, 2004	Kitt Peak	Spacewatch	·	4.1 km	MPC · JPL
215708	2004 AQ_{26}	—	January 13, 2004	Palomar	NEAT	JUN	1.9 km	MPC · JPL
215709	2004 BV_{21}	—	January 19, 2004	Anderson Mesa	LONEOS	·	1.7 km	MPC · JPL
215710	2004 BK_{22}	—	January 17, 2004	Palomar	NEAT	·	1.6 km	MPC · JPL
215711	2004 BD_{50}	—	January 21, 2004	Socorro	LINEAR	EOS	2.6 km	MPC · JPL
215712	2004 BO_{50}	—	January 21, 2004	Socorro	LINEAR	·	2.6 km	MPC · JPL
215713	2004 BZ_{71}	—	January 23, 2004	Socorro	LINEAR	ADE	3.0 km	MPC · JPL
215714	2004 BW_{74}	—	January 25, 2004	Haleakala	NEAT	·	3.7 km	MPC · JPL
215715	2004 BK_{75}	—	January 22, 2004	Socorro	LINEAR	·	2.0 km	MPC · JPL
215716	2004 BH_{76}	—	January 24, 2004	Socorro	LINEAR	·	1.1 km	MPC · JPL
215717	2004 BE_{87}	—	January 22, 2004	Palomar	NEAT	·	2.7 km	MPC · JPL
215718	2004 BY_{91}	—	January 26, 2004	Anderson Mesa	LONEOS	·	3.5 km	MPC · JPL
215719	2004 BR_{94}	—	January 28, 2004	Socorro	LINEAR	ADE	3.6 km	MPC · JPL
215720	2004 BU_{94}	—	January 28, 2004	Socorro	LINEAR	·	4.4 km	MPC · JPL
215721	2004 BU_{96}	—	January 24, 2004	Socorro	LINEAR	fast	2.8 km	MPC · JPL
215722	2004 BZ_{96}	—	January 24, 2004	Socorro	LINEAR	·	4.0 km	MPC · JPL
215723	2004 BT_{101}	—	January 29, 2004	Socorro	LINEAR	·	1.9 km	MPC · JPL
215724	2004 BT_{111}	—	January 30, 2004	Socorro	LINEAR	·	2.1 km	MPC · JPL
215725	2004 BN_{116}	—	January 27, 2004	Catalina	CSS	·	2.9 km	MPC · JPL
215726	2004 BX_{116}	—	January 28, 2004	Catalina	CSS	·	3.9 km	MPC · JPL
215727	2004 BK_{150}	—	January 17, 2004	Palomar	NEAT	MIS	2.6 km	MPC · JPL
215728	2004 CP	—	February 9, 2004	Palomar	NEAT	·	5.1 km	MPC · JPL
215729	2004 CN_{20}	—	February 11, 2004	Kitt Peak	Spacewatch	V	980 m	MPC · JPL
215730	2004 CB_{31}	—	February 12, 2004	Kitt Peak	Spacewatch	·	1.4 km	MPC · JPL
215731	2004 CZ_{58}	—	February 10, 2004	Palomar	NEAT	MAR	1.7 km	MPC · JPL
215732	2004 CL_{73}	—	February 14, 2004	Palomar	NEAT	·	2.8 km	MPC · JPL
215733	2004 CU_{102}	—	February 12, 2004	Palomar	NEAT	V	970 m	MPC · JPL
215734	2004 DV_{19}	—	February 17, 2004	Socorro	LINEAR	EOS	2.3 km	MPC · JPL
215735	2004 DV_{23}	—	February 19, 2004	Socorro	LINEAR	·	2.3 km	MPC · JPL
215736	2004 DX_{39}	—	February 16, 2004	Kitt Peak	Spacewatch	·	2.1 km	MPC · JPL
215737	2004 DG_{44}	—	February 18, 2004	Haleakala	NEAT	·	2.8 km	MPC · JPL
215738	2004 DN_{49}	—	February 19, 2004	Haleakala	NEAT	·	3.5 km	MPC · JPL
215739	2004 DL_{53}	—	February 23, 2004	Bergisch Gladbach	W. Bickel	·	1.8 km	MPC · JPL
215740	2004 ED	—	March 9, 2004	Palomar	NEAT	·	3.1 km	MPC · JPL
215741	2004 EL_{11}	—	March 10, 2004	Palomar	NEAT	·	3.9 km	MPC · JPL
215742	2004 EY_{16}	—	March 12, 2004	Palomar	NEAT	·	3.6 km	MPC · JPL
215743	2004 EV_{29}	—	March 15, 2004	Kitt Peak	Spacewatch	·	2.2 km	MPC · JPL
215744	2004 EB_{48}	—	March 15, 2004	Socorro	LINEAR	·	2.4 km	MPC · JPL
215745	2004 EK_{50}	—	March 12, 2004	Palomar	NEAT	EOS	2.8 km	MPC · JPL
215746	2004 EH_{74}	—	March 13, 2004	Palomar	NEAT	·	1.7 km	MPC · JPL
215747	2004 EU_{82}	—	March 13, 2004	Palomar	NEAT	·	3.0 km	MPC · JPL
215748	2004 EC_{83}	—	March 14, 2004	Socorro	LINEAR	·	2.1 km	MPC · JPL
215749	2004 EN_{83}	—	March 14, 2004	Kitt Peak	Spacewatch	·	4.9 km	MPC · JPL
215750	2004 EK_{85}	—	March 15, 2004	Socorro	LINEAR	·	1.7 km	MPC · JPL
215751	2004 EH_{105}	—	March 15, 2004	Kitt Peak	Spacewatch	·	2.3 km	MPC · JPL
215752	2004 FZ_{2}	—	March 16, 2004	Campo Imperatore	CINEOS	·	1.9 km	MPC · JPL
215753	2004 FB_{9}	—	March 16, 2004	Socorro	LINEAR	·	2.5 km	MPC · JPL
215754	2004 FF_{14}	—	March 16, 2004	Kitt Peak	Spacewatch	·	2.6 km	MPC · JPL
215755	2004 FF_{51}	—	March 19, 2004	Palomar	NEAT	·	2.4 km	MPC · JPL
215756	2004 FQ_{62}	—	March 19, 2004	Socorro	LINEAR	·	2.1 km	MPC · JPL
215757	2004 FU_{64}	—	March 19, 2004	Socorro	LINEAR	AMO +1km	780 m	MPC · JPL
215758	2004 FM_{68}	—	March 21, 2004	Kitt Peak	Spacewatch	·	3.0 km	MPC · JPL
215759	2004 FW_{85}	—	March 19, 2004	Palomar	NEAT	·	2.6 km	MPC · JPL
215760	2004 FZ_{89}	—	March 20, 2004	Socorro	LINEAR	·	3.7 km	MPC · JPL
215761	2004 FF_{90}	—	March 20, 2004	Socorro	LINEAR	·	2.3 km	MPC · JPL
215762	2004 FK_{91}	—	March 21, 2004	Kitt Peak	Spacewatch	·	2.6 km	MPC · JPL
215763	2004 FB_{95}	—	March 19, 2004	Palomar	NEAT	·	2.3 km	MPC · JPL
215764	2004 FQ_{112}	—	March 26, 2004	Kitt Peak	Spacewatch	·	2.7 km	MPC · JPL
215765	2004 FJ_{115}	—	March 23, 2004	Socorro	LINEAR	·	2.0 km	MPC · JPL
215766	2004 FX_{124}	—	March 27, 2004	Socorro	LINEAR	·	2.8 km	MPC · JPL
215767	2004 FZ_{124}	—	March 27, 2004	Socorro	LINEAR	DOR	4.2 km	MPC · JPL
215768	2004 FZ_{131}	—	March 23, 2004	Kitt Peak	Spacewatch	·	2.0 km	MPC · JPL
215769	2004 GA_{12}	—	April 12, 2004	Catalina	CSS	·	3.4 km	MPC · JPL
215770	2004 GP_{16}	—	April 10, 2004	Palomar	NEAT	·	3.4 km	MPC · JPL
215771	2004 GR_{18}	—	April 14, 2004	Kitt Peak	Spacewatch	LIX	4.6 km	MPC · JPL
215772	2004 GU_{29}	—	April 12, 2004	Palomar	NEAT	EOS	2.8 km	MPC · JPL
215773	2004 GX_{31}	—	April 9, 2004	Siding Spring	SSS	DOR	3.7 km	MPC · JPL
215774	2004 GH_{32}	—	April 12, 2004	Palomar	NEAT	·	3.8 km	MPC · JPL
215775	2004 HF_{6}	—	April 17, 2004	Socorro	LINEAR	·	4.5 km	MPC · JPL
215776	2004 HU_{34}	—	April 19, 2004	Kitt Peak	Spacewatch	·	2.3 km	MPC · JPL
215777	2004 HR_{37}	—	April 21, 2004	Črni Vrh	Skvarč, J.	BRA	2.4 km	MPC · JPL
215778	2004 HP_{53}	—	April 25, 2004	Haleakala	NEAT	BRA	2.1 km	MPC · JPL
215779	2004 HY_{65}	—	April 19, 2004	Kitt Peak	Spacewatch	·	2.8 km	MPC · JPL
215780	2004 HR_{69}	—	April 22, 2004	Kitt Peak	Spacewatch	BRA	2.0 km	MPC · JPL
215781	2004 HL_{73}	—	April 28, 2004	Kitt Peak	Spacewatch	·	2.1 km	MPC · JPL
215782	2004 JO_{28}	—	May 13, 2004	Socorro	LINEAR	H	850 m	MPC · JPL
215783	2004 JS_{34}	—	May 15, 2004	Socorro	LINEAR	·	5.0 km	MPC · JPL
215784	2004 JE_{42}	—	May 14, 2004	Kitt Peak	Spacewatch	·	1.1 km	MPC · JPL
215785	2004 KQ_{13}	—	May 21, 2004	Catalina	CSS	·	3.1 km	MPC · JPL
215786	2004 KM_{14}	—	May 23, 2004	Kitt Peak	Spacewatch	·	5.2 km	MPC · JPL
215787	2004 LT	—	June 9, 2004	Catalina	CSS	·	4.1 km	MPC · JPL
215788	2004 LW_{4}	—	June 12, 2004	Socorro	LINEAR	·	2.9 km	MPC · JPL
215789	2004 LQ_{9}	—	June 13, 2004	Palomar	NEAT	EOS	3.5 km	MPC · JPL
215790	2004 LK_{14}	—	June 11, 2004	Socorro	LINEAR	NYS	2.3 km	MPC · JPL
215791	2004 LP_{24}	—	June 12, 2004	Catalina	CSS	·	2.8 km	MPC · JPL
215792	2004 MS_{3}	—	June 19, 2004	Socorro	LINEAR	·	5.2 km	MPC · JPL
215793	2004 MD_{7}	—	June 22, 2004	Kitt Peak	Spacewatch	·	5.8 km	MPC · JPL
215794	2004 NV_{12}	—	July 11, 2004	Socorro	LINEAR	·	3.4 km	MPC · JPL
215795	2004 NF_{18}	—	July 14, 2004	Socorro	LINEAR	·	3.1 km	MPC · JPL
215796	2004 NY_{28}	—	July 14, 2004	Socorro	LINEAR	·	5.2 km	MPC · JPL
215797	2004 OV	—	July 16, 2004	Reedy Creek	J. Broughton	·	5.4 km	MPC · JPL
215798	2004 OZ_{9}	—	July 21, 2004	Reedy Creek	J. Broughton	·	5.3 km	MPC · JPL
215799	2004 OK_{10}	—	July 21, 2004	Reedy Creek	J. Broughton	·	1.2 km	MPC · JPL
215800	2004 PS_{27}	—	August 9, 2004	Reedy Creek	J. Broughton	·	5.6 km	MPC · JPL

== 215801–215900 ==
back to top

Designation			Discovery			Properties		Ref
Permanent	Provisional	Named after	Date	Site	Discoverer(s)	Category	Diam.	Ref
215801	2004 PK_{64}	—	August 10, 2004	Socorro	LINEAR	·	4.4 km	MPC · JPL
215802	2004 PB_{73}	—	August 8, 2004	Socorro	LINEAR	·	1.9 km	MPC · JPL
215803	2004 PQ_{83}	—	August 10, 2004	Socorro	LINEAR	H	940 m	MPC · JPL
215804	2004 QG_{8}	—	August 16, 2004	Siding Spring	SSS	fast	4.6 km	MPC · JPL
215805	2004 RT_{25}	—	September 8, 2004	Uccle	T. Pauwels	MAS	800 m	MPC · JPL
215806	2004 RW_{138}	—	September 8, 2004	Palomar	NEAT	PHO	1.5 km	MPC · JPL
215807	2004 RE_{168}	—	September 8, 2004	Socorro	LINEAR	·	3.3 km	MPC · JPL
215808	2004 RS_{236}	—	September 10, 2004	Kitt Peak	Spacewatch	V	920 m	MPC · JPL
215809 Hugoschwarz	2004 RN_{287}	Hugoschwarz	September 14, 2004	Uccle	P. De Cat	NYS	1.2 km	MPC · JPL
215810	2004 RZ_{290}	—	September 9, 2004	Kitt Peak	Spacewatch	·	2.1 km	MPC · JPL
215811	2004 RE_{308}	—	September 13, 2004	Socorro	LINEAR	·	4.8 km	MPC · JPL
215812	2004 TC_{139}	—	October 9, 2004	Anderson Mesa	LONEOS	HYG	4.6 km	MPC · JPL
215813	2004 TL_{197}	—	October 7, 2004	Kitt Peak	Spacewatch	·	770 m	MPC · JPL
215814	2004 TO_{220}	—	October 6, 2004	Socorro	LINEAR	·	5.2 km	MPC · JPL
215815	2004 TV_{242}	—	October 6, 2004	Socorro	LINEAR	EUN	2.1 km	MPC · JPL
215816	2004 TH_{277}	—	October 9, 2004	Kitt Peak	Spacewatch	(5)	2.0 km	MPC · JPL
215817	2004 VB_{27}	—	November 4, 2004	Catalina	CSS	·	2.3 km	MPC · JPL
215818	2004 XP_{31}	—	December 9, 2004	Catalina	CSS	·	1.9 km	MPC · JPL
215819	2004 XW_{34}	—	December 11, 2004	Kitt Peak	Spacewatch	·	920 m	MPC · JPL
215820	2004 XX_{35}	—	December 9, 2004	Goodricke-Pigott	Goodricke-Pigott	ADE	2.5 km	MPC · JPL
215821	2004 XO_{157}	—	December 14, 2004	Socorro	LINEAR	·	1.1 km	MPC · JPL
215822	2004 XT_{184}	—	December 10, 2004	Kitt Peak	Spacewatch	L5	10 km	MPC · JPL
215823	2005 AX_{18}	—	January 8, 2005	Campo Imperatore	CINEOS	·	1.2 km	MPC · JPL
215824	2005 AY_{25}	—	January 11, 2005	Socorro	LINEAR	·	830 m	MPC · JPL
215825	2005 AC_{32}	—	January 11, 2005	Socorro	LINEAR	·	980 m	MPC · JPL
215826	2005 AN_{43}	—	January 15, 2005	Socorro	LINEAR	·	830 m	MPC · JPL
215827	2005 AW_{53}	—	January 13, 2005	Kitt Peak	Spacewatch	·	1.1 km	MPC · JPL
215828	2005 AX_{53}	—	January 13, 2005	Kitt Peak	Spacewatch	·	910 m	MPC · JPL
215829	2005 AK_{61}	—	January 15, 2005	Kitt Peak	Spacewatch	·	940 m	MPC · JPL
215830	2005 BK_{8}	—	January 16, 2005	Socorro	LINEAR	·	1.1 km	MPC · JPL
215831	2005 BD_{11}	—	January 16, 2005	Kitt Peak	Spacewatch	·	1.6 km	MPC · JPL
215832	2005 BR_{27}	—	January 31, 2005	Mayhill	Lowe, A.	·	1.1 km	MPC · JPL
215833	2005 CZ_{5}	—	February 1, 2005	Kitt Peak	Spacewatch	(2076)	1.1 km	MPC · JPL
215834	2005 CL_{11}	—	February 1, 2005	Kitt Peak	Spacewatch	NYS	1.3 km	MPC · JPL
215835	2005 CZ_{15}	—	February 2, 2005	Socorro	LINEAR	·	3.1 km	MPC · JPL
215836	2005 CW_{18}	—	February 2, 2005	Catalina	CSS	·	1.2 km	MPC · JPL
215837	2005 CX_{20}	—	February 2, 2005	Catalina	CSS	NYS	1.3 km	MPC · JPL
215838	2005 CT_{22}	—	February 1, 2005	Catalina	CSS	·	1.3 km	MPC · JPL
215839	2005 CP_{26}	—	February 1, 2005	Kitt Peak	Spacewatch	·	1.0 km	MPC · JPL
215840	2005 CP_{35}	—	February 2, 2005	Catalina	CSS	MAS	930 m	MPC · JPL
215841 Čimelice	2005 CH_{37}	Čimelice	February 6, 2005	Kleť	KLENOT	NYS	1.3 km	MPC · JPL
215842	2005 CB_{46}	—	February 2, 2005	Kitt Peak	Spacewatch	(29841)	1.8 km	MPC · JPL
215843	2005 CU_{57}	—	February 2, 2005	Catalina	CSS	·	970 m	MPC · JPL
215844	2005 CA_{63}	—	February 9, 2005	Kitt Peak	Spacewatch	KOR	2.3 km	MPC · JPL
215845	2005 CS_{65}	—	February 9, 2005	Kitt Peak	Spacewatch	·	1.0 km	MPC · JPL
215846	2005 EJ_{5}	—	March 1, 2005	Kitt Peak	Spacewatch	·	1.6 km	MPC · JPL
215847	2005 EL_{5}	—	March 1, 2005	Kitt Peak	Spacewatch	·	1.5 km	MPC · JPL
215848	2005 EA_{6}	—	March 1, 2005	Kitt Peak	Spacewatch	·	2.4 km	MPC · JPL
215849	2005 EZ_{12}	—	March 2, 2005	Catalina	CSS	NYS	1.5 km	MPC · JPL
215850	2005 ED_{15}	—	March 3, 2005	Kitt Peak	Spacewatch	NYS	1.4 km	MPC · JPL
215851	2005 EB_{18}	—	March 3, 2005	Kitt Peak	Spacewatch	MAS	860 m	MPC · JPL
215852	2005 ES_{20}	—	March 3, 2005	Catalina	CSS	·	1.4 km	MPC · JPL
215853	2005 EB_{29}	—	March 3, 2005	Catalina	CSS	NYS	1.9 km	MPC · JPL
215854	2005 EQ_{29}	—	March 2, 2005	Catalina	CSS	·	1.3 km	MPC · JPL
215855	2005 EG_{36}	—	March 4, 2005	Catalina	CSS	·	1.6 km	MPC · JPL
215856	2005 ER_{47}	—	March 3, 2005	Catalina	CSS	·	1.3 km	MPC · JPL
215857	2005 EF_{52}	—	March 4, 2005	Kitt Peak	Spacewatch	·	1.5 km	MPC · JPL
215858	2005 ES_{58}	—	March 4, 2005	Kitt Peak	Spacewatch	MAS	970 m	MPC · JPL
215859	2005 EJ_{63}	—	March 4, 2005	Socorro	LINEAR	·	1.7 km	MPC · JPL
215860	2005 EQ_{71}	—	March 2, 2005	Catalina	CSS	·	1.5 km	MPC · JPL
215861	2005 EM_{101}	—	March 3, 2005	Catalina	CSS	·	3.1 km	MPC · JPL
215862	2005 ED_{112}	—	March 4, 2005	Socorro	LINEAR	V	1.0 km	MPC · JPL
215863	2005 EX_{132}	—	March 9, 2005	Socorro	LINEAR	NYS	1.2 km	MPC · JPL
215864	2005 EC_{142}	—	March 10, 2005	Catalina	CSS	·	1.7 km	MPC · JPL
215865	2005 ET_{144}	—	March 10, 2005	Mount Lemmon	Mount Lemmon Survey	·	3.8 km	MPC · JPL
215866	2005 EG_{145}	—	March 10, 2005	Mount Lemmon	Mount Lemmon Survey	·	1.6 km	MPC · JPL
215867	2005 EK_{148}	—	March 10, 2005	Kitt Peak	Spacewatch	·	1.7 km	MPC · JPL
215868 Rohrer	2005 EA_{153}	Rohrer	March 12, 2005	Gnosca	S. Sposetti	·	1.4 km	MPC · JPL
215869	2005 ET_{156}	—	March 9, 2005	Anderson Mesa	LONEOS	·	1.7 km	MPC · JPL
215870	2005 EM_{161}	—	March 9, 2005	Mount Lemmon	Mount Lemmon Survey	MAS	880 m	MPC · JPL
215871	2005 EO_{165}	—	March 11, 2005	Kitt Peak	Spacewatch	MAS	840 m	MPC · JPL
215872	2005 EH_{176}	—	March 8, 2005	Mount Lemmon	Mount Lemmon Survey	·	1.2 km	MPC · JPL
215873	2005 EO_{183}	—	March 9, 2005	Mount Lemmon	Mount Lemmon Survey	MAS	790 m	MPC · JPL
215874	2005 EB_{193}	—	March 11, 2005	Mount Lemmon	Mount Lemmon Survey	NYS	1.3 km	MPC · JPL
215875	2005 EY_{193}	—	March 11, 2005	Mount Lemmon	Mount Lemmon Survey	·	1.5 km	MPC · JPL
215876	2005 EO_{207}	—	March 9, 2005	Socorro	LINEAR	·	1.4 km	MPC · JPL
215877	2005 EU_{219}	—	March 10, 2005	Anderson Mesa	LONEOS	·	2.4 km	MPC · JPL
215878	2005 EM_{230}	—	March 10, 2005	Mount Lemmon	Mount Lemmon Survey	·	1.1 km	MPC · JPL
215879	2005 EA_{231}	—	March 10, 2005	Catalina	CSS	·	1.7 km	MPC · JPL
215880	2005 EA_{245}	—	March 11, 2005	Mount Lemmon	Mount Lemmon Survey	·	1.9 km	MPC · JPL
215881	2005 EE_{245}	—	March 11, 2005	Kitt Peak	Spacewatch	MAS	930 m	MPC · JPL
215882	2005 EO_{253}	—	March 11, 2005	Kitt Peak	Spacewatch	MAS	890 m	MPC · JPL
215883	2005 EJ_{295}	—	March 13, 2005	Kitt Peak	Spacewatch	·	1.6 km	MPC · JPL
215884 Jayantmurthy	2005 EX_{296}	Jayantmurthy	March 9, 2005	Kitt Peak	M. W. Buie	·	1.0 km	MPC · JPL
215885	2005 EW_{323}	—	March 4, 2005	Mount Lemmon	Mount Lemmon Survey	·	1.7 km	MPC · JPL
215886 Barryarnold	2005 FP	Barryarnold	March 16, 2005	Saint-Sulpice	B. Christophe	·	1.3 km	MPC · JPL
215887	2005 GZ_{2}	—	April 1, 2005	Kitt Peak	Spacewatch	NYS	1.2 km	MPC · JPL
215888	2005 GU_{4}	—	April 1, 2005	Kitt Peak	Spacewatch	V	1.1 km	MPC · JPL
215889	2005 GY_{5}	—	April 1, 2005	Kitt Peak	Spacewatch	·	1.7 km	MPC · JPL
215890	2005 GM_{17}	—	April 2, 2005	Mount Lemmon	Mount Lemmon Survey	MAS	800 m	MPC · JPL
215891	2005 GF_{19}	—	April 2, 2005	Mount Lemmon	Mount Lemmon Survey	·	1.2 km	MPC · JPL
215892	2005 GG_{30}	—	April 4, 2005	Catalina	CSS	·	1.5 km	MPC · JPL
215893	2005 GS_{42}	—	April 5, 2005	Mount Lemmon	Mount Lemmon Survey	V	780 m	MPC · JPL
215894	2005 GN_{53}	—	April 2, 2005	Mount Lemmon	Mount Lemmon Survey	·	1.1 km	MPC · JPL
215895	2005 GG_{54}	—	April 5, 2005	Mount Lemmon	Mount Lemmon Survey	·	1.3 km	MPC · JPL
215896	2005 GV_{58}	—	April 4, 2005	Catalina	CSS	·	1.7 km	MPC · JPL
215897	2005 GJ_{66}	—	April 2, 2005	Mount Lemmon	Mount Lemmon Survey	·	930 m	MPC · JPL
215898	2005 GR_{69}	—	April 3, 2005	Palomar	NEAT	·	2.9 km	MPC · JPL
215899	2005 GQ_{104}	—	April 10, 2005	Kitt Peak	Spacewatch	·	1.2 km	MPC · JPL
215900	2005 GR_{124}	—	April 9, 2005	Catalina	CSS	PHO	3.8 km	MPC · JPL

== 215901–216000 ==
back to top

Designation			Discovery			Properties		Ref
Permanent	Provisional	Named after	Date	Site	Discoverer(s)	Category	Diam.	Ref
215901	2005 GA_{130}	—	April 7, 2005	Kitt Peak	Spacewatch	V	980 m	MPC · JPL
215902	2005 GL_{169}	—	April 12, 2005	Kitt Peak	Spacewatch	·	3.5 km	MPC · JPL
215903	2005 GO_{181}	—	April 12, 2005	Kitt Peak	Spacewatch	NYS	1.5 km	MPC · JPL
215904	2005 GX_{181}	—	April 12, 2005	Kitt Peak	Spacewatch	MAS	1.1 km	MPC · JPL
215905 Andrewpoppe	2005 GF_{223}	Andrewpoppe	April 10, 2005	Kitt Peak	M. W. Buie	NYS	1.1 km	MPC · JPL
215906	2005 GV_{226}	—	April 14, 2005	Catalina	CSS	·	1.5 km	MPC · JPL
215907	2005 HT_{3}	—	April 27, 2005	Cordell-Lorenz	D. T. Durig	V	1.1 km	MPC · JPL
215908	2005 HH_{6}	—	April 30, 2005	Kitt Peak	Spacewatch	·	1.4 km	MPC · JPL
215909	2005 JH_{13}	—	May 4, 2005	Mauna Kea	Veillet, C.	·	1.8 km	MPC · JPL
215910	2005 JL_{20}	—	May 4, 2005	Catalina	CSS	·	2.3 km	MPC · JPL
215911	2005 JX_{21}	—	May 6, 2005	Catalina	CSS	·	1.8 km	MPC · JPL
215912	2005 JK_{30}	—	May 4, 2005	Kitt Peak	Spacewatch	·	1.8 km	MPC · JPL
215913	2005 JE_{34}	—	May 4, 2005	Palomar	NEAT	·	1.7 km	MPC · JPL
215914	2005 JK_{36}	—	May 4, 2005	Palomar	NEAT	·	1.4 km	MPC · JPL
215915	2005 JG_{39}	—	May 7, 2005	Kitt Peak	Spacewatch	·	2.0 km	MPC · JPL
215916	2005 JT_{48}	—	May 3, 2005	Kitt Peak	Spacewatch	·	1.3 km	MPC · JPL
215917	2005 JB_{56}	—	May 6, 2005	Mount Lemmon	Mount Lemmon Survey	MAS	770 m	MPC · JPL
215918	2005 JG_{56}	—	May 6, 2005	Kitt Peak	Spacewatch	·	2.6 km	MPC · JPL
215919	2005 JZ_{70}	—	May 7, 2005	Catalina	CSS	EUN	1.6 km	MPC · JPL
215920	2005 JB_{86}	—	May 8, 2005	Mount Lemmon	Mount Lemmon Survey	·	2.0 km	MPC · JPL
215921	2005 JV_{98}	—	May 8, 2005	Anderson Mesa	LONEOS	·	3.1 km	MPC · JPL
215922	2005 JG_{103}	—	May 9, 2005	Kitt Peak	Spacewatch	·	1.9 km	MPC · JPL
215923	2005 JP_{103}	—	May 10, 2005	Kitt Peak	Spacewatch	·	1.9 km	MPC · JPL
215924	2005 JX_{104}	—	May 11, 2005	Kitt Peak	Spacewatch	·	1.1 km	MPC · JPL
215925	2005 JP_{107}	—	May 12, 2005	Mount Lemmon	Mount Lemmon Survey	·	1.6 km	MPC · JPL
215926	2005 JX_{126}	—	May 12, 2005	Catalina	CSS	·	2.6 km	MPC · JPL
215927	2005 JZ_{127}	—	May 12, 2005	Socorro	LINEAR	·	1.8 km	MPC · JPL
215928	2005 JX_{151}	—	May 4, 2005	Palomar	NEAT	·	1.5 km	MPC · JPL
215929	2005 JP_{153}	—	May 4, 2005	Catalina	CSS	·	1.9 km	MPC · JPL
215930	2005 JB_{161}	—	May 8, 2005	Kitt Peak	Spacewatch	EUN	1.3 km	MPC · JPL
215931	2005 KF_{4}	—	May 17, 2005	Mount Lemmon	Mount Lemmon Survey	·	1.5 km	MPC · JPL
215932	2005 KY_{4}	—	May 18, 2005	Palomar	NEAT	·	1.8 km	MPC · JPL
215933	2005 KU_{5}	—	May 16, 2005	Kitt Peak	Spacewatch	·	2.9 km	MPC · JPL
215934	2005 KV_{6}	—	May 19, 2005	Mount Lemmon	Mount Lemmon Survey	·	2.3 km	MPC · JPL
215935	2005 KW_{6}	—	May 19, 2005	Mount Lemmon	Mount Lemmon Survey	·	1.5 km	MPC · JPL
215936	2005 KQ_{10}	—	May 30, 2005	Junk Bond	Junk Bond	·	4.5 km	MPC · JPL
215937	2005 KW_{10}	—	May 31, 2005	Reedy Creek	J. Broughton	MAR	3.7 km	MPC · JPL
215938	2005 LS_{4}	—	June 1, 2005	Kitt Peak	Spacewatch	·	2.0 km	MPC · JPL
215939	2005 LQ_{5}	—	June 2, 2005	Siding Spring	SSS	·	2.4 km	MPC · JPL
215940	2005 LS_{5}	—	June 2, 2005	Siding Spring	SSS	·	2.9 km	MPC · JPL
215941	2005 LO_{20}	—	June 4, 2005	Kitt Peak	Spacewatch	·	1.5 km	MPC · JPL
215942	2005 LG_{22}	—	June 8, 2005	Kitt Peak	Spacewatch	·	1.5 km	MPC · JPL
215943	2005 MN_{3}	—	June 24, 2005	Palomar	NEAT	·	2.0 km	MPC · JPL
215944	2005 MU_{11}	—	June 27, 2005	Kitt Peak	Spacewatch	·	1.8 km	MPC · JPL
215945	2005 ML_{15}	—	June 29, 2005	Palomar	NEAT	·	2.7 km	MPC · JPL
215946	2005 MA_{23}	—	June 30, 2005	Catalina	CSS	·	4.8 km	MPC · JPL
215947	2005 MZ_{38}	—	June 30, 2005	Kitt Peak	Spacewatch	·	5.6 km	MPC · JPL
215948	2005 MC_{43}	—	June 30, 2005	Kitt Peak	Spacewatch	·	2.3 km	MPC · JPL
215949	2005 MH_{43}	—	June 21, 2005	Palomar	NEAT	·	3.9 km	MPC · JPL
215950	2005 NO_{6}	—	July 4, 2005	Mount Lemmon	Mount Lemmon Survey	·	2.4 km	MPC · JPL
215951	2005 NC_{23}	—	July 4, 2005	Palomar	NEAT	·	1.5 km	MPC · JPL
215952	2005 NX_{27}	—	July 5, 2005	Palomar	NEAT	·	2.6 km	MPC · JPL
215953	2005 NR_{31}	—	July 4, 2005	Palomar	NEAT	AEO	1.6 km	MPC · JPL
215954	2005 NS_{31}	—	July 5, 2005	Catalina	CSS	JUN	1.8 km	MPC · JPL
215955	2005 NF_{39}	—	July 6, 2005	Reedy Creek	J. Broughton	·	2.8 km	MPC · JPL
215956	2005 NW_{40}	—	July 3, 2005	Mount Lemmon	Mount Lemmon Survey	·	3.1 km	MPC · JPL
215957	2005 NT_{55}	—	July 11, 2005	Mayhill	Lowe, A.	JUN	1.6 km	MPC · JPL
215958	2005 NN_{56}	—	July 5, 2005	Kitt Peak	Spacewatch	KOR	1.6 km	MPC · JPL
215959	2005 NL_{72}	—	July 6, 2005	Siding Spring	SSS	·	2.8 km	MPC · JPL
215960	2005 NX_{74}	—	July 9, 2005	Kitt Peak	Spacewatch	EOS	2.5 km	MPC · JPL
215961	2005 NC_{122}	—	July 10, 2005	Siding Spring	SSS	·	1.7 km	MPC · JPL
215962	2005 PA	—	August 1, 2005	Campo Imperatore	CINEOS	MRX	1.4 km	MPC · JPL
215963	2005 PK_{18}	—	August 11, 2005	Reedy Creek	J. Broughton	BRA	2.3 km	MPC · JPL
215964	2005 QZ_{2}	—	August 24, 2005	Palomar	NEAT	·	3.1 km	MPC · JPL
215965	2005 QL_{32}	—	August 24, 2005	Palomar	NEAT	NYS	1.4 km	MPC · JPL
215966	2005 QD_{38}	—	August 25, 2005	Palomar	NEAT	·	5.5 km	MPC · JPL
215967	2005 QQ_{43}	—	August 26, 2005	Palomar	NEAT	EOS	2.5 km	MPC · JPL
215968	2005 QO_{53}	—	August 28, 2005	Kitt Peak	Spacewatch	THM	3.2 km	MPC · JPL
215969	2005 QJ_{55}	—	August 28, 2005	Kitt Peak	Spacewatch	·	2.4 km	MPC · JPL
215970 Campidoglio	2005 QV_{66}	Campidoglio	August 28, 2005	Campo Catino	M. Di Sora, F. Mallia	GEF	2.2 km	MPC · JPL
215971	2005 QN_{68}	—	August 28, 2005	Siding Spring	SSS	HYG	3.7 km	MPC · JPL
215972	2005 QM_{90}	—	August 25, 2005	Palomar	NEAT	·	4.0 km	MPC · JPL
215973	2005 QW_{96}	—	August 27, 2005	Palomar	NEAT	·	3.0 km	MPC · JPL
215974	2005 QQ_{106}	—	August 27, 2005	Palomar	NEAT	·	3.5 km	MPC · JPL
215975	2005 QK_{111}	—	August 27, 2005	Palomar	NEAT	EOS	2.5 km	MPC · JPL
215976	2005 QU_{120}	—	August 28, 2005	Kitt Peak	Spacewatch	·	2.5 km	MPC · JPL
215977	2005 QR_{149}	—	August 28, 2005	Siding Spring	SSS	EOS	3.1 km	MPC · JPL
215978	2005 QV_{179}	—	August 26, 2005	Palomar	NEAT	·	3.3 km	MPC · JPL
215979	2005 RD_{11}	—	September 10, 2005	Anderson Mesa	LONEOS	·	4.9 km	MPC · JPL
215980	2005 RP_{22}	—	September 10, 2005	Anderson Mesa	LONEOS	·	3.4 km	MPC · JPL
215981	2005 RR_{26}	—	September 8, 2005	Socorro	LINEAR	·	2.9 km	MPC · JPL
215982	2005 SN_{27}	—	September 23, 2005	Kitt Peak	Spacewatch	·	4.8 km	MPC · JPL
215983	2005 SC_{33}	—	September 23, 2005	Kitt Peak	Spacewatch	·	3.8 km	MPC · JPL
215984	2005 SO_{37}	—	September 24, 2005	Kitt Peak	Spacewatch	VER	4.5 km	MPC · JPL
215985	2005 SH_{46}	—	September 24, 2005	Kitt Peak	Spacewatch	EOS	2.9 km	MPC · JPL
215986	2005 SR_{48}	—	September 24, 2005	Kitt Peak	Spacewatch	·	2.8 km	MPC · JPL
215987	2005 SW_{60}	—	September 26, 2005	Kitt Peak	Spacewatch	·	4.6 km	MPC · JPL
215988	2005 ST_{70}	—	September 26, 2005	Palomar	NEAT	·	4.6 km	MPC · JPL
215989	2005 SK_{85}	—	September 24, 2005	Kitt Peak	Spacewatch	·	5.3 km	MPC · JPL
215990	2005 SN_{119}	—	September 28, 2005	Palomar	NEAT	TIR	2.5 km	MPC · JPL
215991	2005 SZ_{125}	—	September 29, 2005	Palomar	NEAT	·	3.8 km	MPC · JPL
215992	2005 SS_{126}	—	September 29, 2005	Mount Lemmon	Mount Lemmon Survey	THM	2.8 km	MPC · JPL
215993	2005 SN_{163}	—	September 27, 2005	Palomar	NEAT	·	4.0 km	MPC · JPL
215994	2005 SJ_{166}	—	September 28, 2005	Palomar	NEAT	·	4.3 km	MPC · JPL
215995	2005 SR_{178}	—	September 29, 2005	Anderson Mesa	LONEOS	·	3.7 km	MPC · JPL
215996	2005 SP_{185}	—	September 29, 2005	Mount Lemmon	Mount Lemmon Survey	·	3.0 km	MPC · JPL
215997	2005 SH_{199}	—	September 30, 2005	Mount Lemmon	Mount Lemmon Survey	·	3.4 km	MPC · JPL
215998	2005 SH_{201}	—	September 30, 2005	Kitt Peak	Spacewatch	·	4.2 km	MPC · JPL
215999	2005 SV_{242}	—	September 30, 2005	Palomar	NEAT	CYB	4.8 km	MPC · JPL
216000	2005 SF_{258}	—	September 23, 2005	Kitt Peak	Spacewatch	THM	3.4 km	MPC · JPL

back to top

== See also ==
- Meanings of minor-planet names: 215001–216000
