= Meanings of minor-planet names: 213001–214000 =

As minor planet discoveries are confirmed, they are given a permanent number by the IAU's Minor Planet Center (MPC), and the discoverers can then submit names for them, following the IAU's naming conventions. The list below concerns those minor planets in the specified number-range that have received names, and explains the meanings of those names.

Official naming citations of newly named small Solar System bodies are approved and published in a bulletin by IAU's Working Group for Small Bodies Nomenclature (WGSBN). Before May 2021, citations were published in MPC's Minor Planet Circulars for many decades. Recent citations can also be found on the JPL Small-Body Database (SBDB). Until his death in 2016, German astronomer Lutz D. Schmadel compiled these citations into the Dictionary of Minor Planet Names (DMP) and regularly updated the collection.

Based on Paul Herget's The Names of the Minor Planets, Schmadel also researched the unclear origin of numerous asteroids, most of which had been named prior to World War II. This article incorporates text from this source, which is in the public domain: SBDB New namings may only be added to this list below after official publication as the preannouncement of names is condemned. The WGSBN publishes a comprehensive guideline for the naming rules of non-cometary small Solar System bodies.

== 213001–213100 ==
Named minor planet	Provisional	This minor planet was named for...	Ref · Catalog
There are no named minor planets in this number range

== 213101–213200 ==
back to top

Named minor planet	Provisional	This minor planet was named for...	Ref · Catalog
213197 Lessac-Chenen	2000 SW_{345}	Erik J. Lessac-Chenen (b. 1982), an American engineer at KinetX Aerospace, Inc.	IAU · 213197

== 213201–213300 ==
back to top

Named minor planet	Provisional	This minor planet was named for...	Ref · Catalog
213255 Kimiyayui	2001 EZ_{15}	Enthusiastic amateur astronomer Kimiya Yui (born 1970) was selected to be an astronaut candidate by Japan Aerospace Exploration Agency in 2009, and was certified as an International Space Station (ISS) astronaut in 2011. On July 22, 2015, he flew to ISS and stayed in space for 141 days.	JPL · 213255
213269 Angelbarbero	2001 MO_{2}	Angel Barbero Peregrina (born 1972) worked from 2004 until 2014 as a chef at the Spanish Calar Alto Observatory. Through his culinary skills he contributed significantly to the well-being of his colleagues, visiting astronomers, and the discoverers of this asteroid. He and his food are dearly missed.	JPL · 213269

== 213301–213400 ==
back to top

Named minor planet	Provisional	This minor planet was named for...	Ref · Catalog
There are no named minor planets in this number range

== 213401–213500 ==
back to top

Named minor planet	Provisional	This minor planet was named for...	Ref · Catalog
There are no named minor planets in this number range

== 213501–213600 ==
back to top

Named minor planet	Provisional	This minor planet was named for...	Ref · Catalog
There are no named minor planets in this number range

== 213601–213700 ==
back to top

Named minor planet	Provisional	This minor planet was named for...	Ref · Catalog
213629 Binford	2002 QK_{67}	Lewis Binford (1931–2011), American archaeologist and anthropologist.	JPL · 213629
213636 Gajdoš	2002 QR_{122}	Štefan Gajdoš (born 1959), Slovak astronomer, discoverer of minor planets, and lecturer at the Comenius University in Bratislava	JPL · 213636
213637 Lemarchal	2002 QM_{125}	Grégory Lemarchal (1983–2007), a French pop-rock singer. He won the French version of Star Academy TV show and became very popular afterward. In 2006 he was honored as "breakthrough artist of the year" at the NRJ Music Awards. The asteroid's name was suggested by Slovak amateur astronomer Stefan Kürti and officially named by the MPC on 23 September 2010.	JPL · 213637

== 213701–213800 ==
back to top

Named minor planet	Provisional	This minor planet was named for...	Ref · Catalog
213770 Fignon	2003 DK_{6}	Laurent Fignon (1960–2010), a famous French professional road bicycle racer.	JPL · 213770
213771 Johndee	2003 DE_{13}	John Dee (c. 1527–1609), English mathematician, astronomer, and navigation expert	JPL · 213771
213772 Blaheta	2003 DF_{13}	Radim Blaheta (born 1951), a professor in applied mathematics at the University of Ostrava in the Czech Republic, whose research includes mathematical modeling in Earth science and climate engineering.	IAU · 213772
213775 Zdeněkdostál	2003 DK_{17}	Zdeněk Dostál (born 1946), a professor in applied mathematics at the University of Ostrava in the Czech Republic, developing "algorithms for quadratic programming problems" and "scalable domain decomposition".	IAU · 213775
213800 Stefanwul	2003 GO	Stefan Wul (1922–2003), pen name of French science-fiction writer Pierre Pairault.	JPL · 213800

== 213801–213900 ==
back to top

Named minor planet	Provisional	This minor planet was named for...	Ref · Catalog
There are no named minor planets in this number range

== 213901–214000 ==
back to top

Named minor planet	Provisional	This minor planet was named for...	Ref · Catalog
There are no named minor planets in this number range

back to top

Preceded by 212,001–213,000	Meanings of minor-planet names List of minor planets: 213,001–214,000	Succeeded by 214,001–215,000
