= List of minor planets: 213001–214000 =

The following is a partial list of minor planets, running from minor-planet number 213001 through 214000, inclusive. The primary data for this and other partial lists is based on JPL's "Small-Body Orbital Elements" and data available from the Minor Planet Center. Critical list information is also provided by the MPC, unless otherwise specified from Lowell Observatory. A detailed description of the table's columns and additional sources are given on the main page including a complete list of every page in this series, and a statistical break-up on the dynamical classification of minor planets.

Also see the summary list of all named bodies in numerical and alphabetical order, and the corresponding naming citations for the number range of this particular list. New namings may only be added to this list after official publication, as the preannouncement of names is condemned by the Working Group for Small Bodies Nomenclature of the International Astronomical Union.

Near-Earth obj.	MBA (inner)	MBA (outer)	Centaur
Mars-crosser	MBA (middle)	Jupiter trojan	Trans-Neptunian obj.
Unclassified

== 213001–213100 ==
Designation			Discovery			Properties		Ref
Permanent	Provisional	Named after	Date	Site	Discoverer(s)	Category	Diam.	Ref
213001	1981 EP_{3}	—	March 2, 1981	Siding Spring	S. J. Bus	LIX	5.3 km	MPC · JPL
213002	1982 QF_{4}	—	August 22, 1982	Siding Spring	Lowe, A.	PHO	1.1 km	MPC · JPL
213003	1992 EC_{23}	—	March 1, 1992	La Silla	UESAC	·	1.9 km	MPC · JPL
213004	1992 SJ_{7}	—	September 26, 1992	Kitt Peak	Spacewatch	·	2.2 km	MPC · JPL
213005	1993 RC	—	September 11, 1993	Stroncone	A. Vagnozzi	URS	5.6 km	MPC · JPL
213006	1994 SL_{5}	—	September 28, 1994	Kitt Peak	Spacewatch	EUN	1.9 km	MPC · JPL
213007	1995 BP_{8}	—	January 29, 1995	Kitt Peak	Spacewatch	·	650 m	MPC · JPL
213008	1995 DB_{3}	—	February 24, 1995	Siding Spring	R. H. McNaught	H	920 m	MPC · JPL
213009	1995 FB_{15}	—	March 27, 1995	Kitt Peak	Spacewatch	·	2.4 km	MPC · JPL
213010	1995 OW_{4}	—	July 22, 1995	Kitt Peak	Spacewatch	·	1.4 km	MPC · JPL
213011	1995 OT_{12}	—	July 22, 1995	Kitt Peak	Spacewatch	·	1.6 km	MPC · JPL
213012	1995 SA_{12}	—	September 18, 1995	Kitt Peak	Spacewatch	MAS	960 m	MPC · JPL
213013	1995 SN_{25}	—	September 19, 1995	Kitt Peak	Spacewatch	·	4.0 km	MPC · JPL
213014	1995 SS_{41}	—	September 25, 1995	Kitt Peak	Spacewatch	·	3.3 km	MPC · JPL
213015	1995 SE_{50}	—	September 26, 1995	Kitt Peak	Spacewatch	ERI	2.0 km	MPC · JPL
213016	1995 SX_{51}	—	September 26, 1995	Kitt Peak	Spacewatch	·	3.6 km	MPC · JPL
213017	1995 SO_{81}	—	September 22, 1995	Kitt Peak	Spacewatch	·	1.1 km	MPC · JPL
213018	1995 UD_{11}	—	October 17, 1995	Kitt Peak	Spacewatch	·	1.6 km	MPC · JPL
213019	1995 UE_{58}	—	October 17, 1995	Kitt Peak	Spacewatch	·	1.8 km	MPC · JPL
213020	1995 UK_{82}	—	October 28, 1995	Kitt Peak	Spacewatch	·	3.4 km	MPC · JPL
213021	1995 VK_{6}	—	November 14, 1995	Kitt Peak	Spacewatch	·	1.3 km	MPC · JPL
213022	1995 VG_{17}	—	November 15, 1995	Kitt Peak	Spacewatch	·	1.9 km	MPC · JPL
213023	1995 WK_{18}	—	November 17, 1995	Kitt Peak	Spacewatch	HYG	3.9 km	MPC · JPL
213024	1995 WX_{21}	—	November 17, 1995	Kitt Peak	Spacewatch	·	1.7 km	MPC · JPL
213025	1996 FL_{8}	—	March 19, 1996	Kitt Peak	Spacewatch	·	1.8 km	MPC · JPL
213026	1996 HZ_{5}	—	April 17, 1996	Kitt Peak	Spacewatch	·	2.3 km	MPC · JPL
213027	1996 VZ_{6}	—	November 2, 1996	Xinglong	SCAP	·	1.3 km	MPC · JPL
213028	1996 VN_{9}	—	November 3, 1996	Kitt Peak	Spacewatch	·	3.7 km	MPC · JPL
213029	1997 BF_{5}	—	January 31, 1997	Kitt Peak	Spacewatch	·	1.5 km	MPC · JPL
213030	1997 GN_{7}	—	April 2, 1997	Socorro	LINEAR	·	2.1 km	MPC · JPL
213031	1997 OB	—	July 25, 1997	Caussols	ODAS	(5)	1.9 km	MPC · JPL
213032	1997 TX_{3}	—	October 3, 1997	Caussols	ODAS	·	2.9 km	MPC · JPL
213033	1997 UT_{15}	—	October 23, 1997	Kitt Peak	Spacewatch	·	1.9 km	MPC · JPL
213034	1997 WL_{5}	—	November 23, 1997	Kitt Peak	Spacewatch	·	2.5 km	MPC · JPL
213035	1997 WV_{5}	—	November 23, 1997	Kitt Peak	Spacewatch	·	3.1 km	MPC · JPL
213036	1997 WD_{45}	—	November 29, 1997	Socorro	LINEAR	·	3.7 km	MPC · JPL
213037	1998 FY_{7}	—	March 20, 1998	Kitt Peak	Spacewatch	·	3.2 km	MPC · JPL
213038	1998 FV_{128}	—	March 22, 1998	Socorro	LINEAR	·	4.4 km	MPC · JPL
213039	1998 GV_{2}	—	April 2, 1998	Socorro	LINEAR	·	6.5 km	MPC · JPL
213040	1998 HY_{1}	—	April 19, 1998	Kitt Peak	Spacewatch	·	1.4 km	MPC · JPL
213041	1998 HJ_{22}	—	April 20, 1998	Socorro	LINEAR	·	1.4 km	MPC · JPL
213042	1998 HJ_{96}	—	April 21, 1998	Socorro	LINEAR	·	1.7 km	MPC · JPL
213043	1998 KB_{17}	—	May 24, 1998	Kitt Peak	Spacewatch	(31811)	4.5 km	MPC · JPL
213044	1998 OG_{10}	—	July 26, 1998	La Silla	E. W. Elst	·	2.1 km	MPC · JPL
213045	1998 OL_{15}	—	July 26, 1998	Kitt Peak	Spacewatch	·	2.1 km	MPC · JPL
213046	1998 QA_{85}	—	August 24, 1998	Socorro	LINEAR	·	1.7 km	MPC · JPL
213047	1998 SJ_{75}	—	September 21, 1998	La Silla	E. W. Elst	·	3.2 km	MPC · JPL
213048	1998 SE_{99}	—	September 26, 1998	Socorro	LINEAR	·	2.1 km	MPC · JPL
213049	1998 SY_{130}	—	September 26, 1998	Socorro	LINEAR	JUN	1.5 km	MPC · JPL
213050	1998 TS_{3}	—	October 12, 1998	Ondřejov	L. Kotková	·	740 m	MPC · JPL
213051	1998 UZ_{17}	—	October 19, 1998	Xinglong	SCAP	·	2.8 km	MPC · JPL
213052	1998 VV	—	November 10, 1998	Socorro	LINEAR	BAR	2.3 km	MPC · JPL
213053	1998 WT_{30}	—	November 24, 1998	Kitt Peak	Spacewatch	AMO	370 m	MPC · JPL
213054	1999 AW_{15}	—	January 9, 1999	Kitt Peak	Spacewatch	·	3.0 km	MPC · JPL
213055	1999 AL_{30}	—	January 14, 1999	Kitt Peak	Spacewatch	·	3.1 km	MPC · JPL
213056	1999 JA_{14}	—	May 13, 1999	Socorro	LINEAR	·	1.5 km	MPC · JPL
213057	1999 NM_{54}	—	July 12, 1999	Socorro	LINEAR	TIR ·	6.8 km	MPC · JPL
213058	1999 RJ_{7}	—	September 3, 1999	Kitt Peak	Spacewatch	CYB	4.6 km	MPC · JPL
213059	1999 RG_{42}	—	September 14, 1999	Ondřejov	P. Pravec, P. Kušnirák	·	4.8 km	MPC · JPL
213060	1999 RU_{50}	—	September 7, 1999	Socorro	LINEAR	NYS	1.8 km	MPC · JPL
213061	1999 RB_{64}	—	September 7, 1999	Socorro	LINEAR	·	5.4 km	MPC · JPL
213062	1999 RY_{82}	—	September 7, 1999	Socorro	LINEAR	·	1.4 km	MPC · JPL
213063	1999 RH_{94}	—	September 7, 1999	Socorro	LINEAR	·	1.6 km	MPC · JPL
213064	1999 RX_{121}	—	September 9, 1999	Socorro	LINEAR	·	1.1 km	MPC · JPL
213065	1999 RT_{127}	—	September 9, 1999	Socorro	LINEAR	·	1.5 km	MPC · JPL
213066	1999 RX_{133}	—	September 9, 1999	Socorro	LINEAR	·	1.8 km	MPC · JPL
213067	1999 ST_{15}	—	September 30, 1999	Catalina	CSS	·	5.9 km	MPC · JPL
213068	1999 SU_{23}	—	September 30, 1999	Kitt Peak	Spacewatch	·	950 m	MPC · JPL
213069	1999 TX_{17}	—	October 4, 1999	Xinglong	SCAP	·	3.3 km	MPC · JPL
213070	1999 TU_{50}	—	October 4, 1999	Kitt Peak	Spacewatch	·	1.2 km	MPC · JPL
213071	1999 TW_{51}	—	October 4, 1999	Kitt Peak	Spacewatch	·	1.7 km	MPC · JPL
213072	1999 TJ_{79}	—	October 11, 1999	Kitt Peak	Spacewatch	·	900 m	MPC · JPL
213073	1999 TE_{90}	—	October 2, 1999	Socorro	LINEAR	TIR	3.4 km	MPC · JPL
213074	1999 TH_{90}	—	October 2, 1999	Socorro	LINEAR	MAS	1.1 km	MPC · JPL
213075	1999 TK_{90}	—	October 2, 1999	Socorro	LINEAR	·	2.2 km	MPC · JPL
213076	1999 TY_{115}	—	October 4, 1999	Socorro	LINEAR	·	1.8 km	MPC · JPL
213077	1999 TY_{116}	—	October 4, 1999	Socorro	LINEAR	·	1.6 km	MPC · JPL
213078	1999 TG_{131}	—	October 6, 1999	Socorro	LINEAR	PHO	1.4 km	MPC · JPL
213079	1999 TL_{132}	—	October 6, 1999	Socorro	LINEAR	MAS	1.0 km	MPC · JPL
213080	1999 TQ_{133}	—	October 6, 1999	Socorro	LINEAR	NYS	1.5 km	MPC · JPL
213081	1999 TP_{137}	—	October 6, 1999	Socorro	LINEAR	PHO	1.4 km	MPC · JPL
213082	1999 TG_{138}	—	October 6, 1999	Socorro	LINEAR	·	1.4 km	MPC · JPL
213083	1999 TV_{159}	—	October 9, 1999	Socorro	LINEAR	·	1.3 km	MPC · JPL
213084	1999 TN_{169}	—	October 10, 1999	Socorro	LINEAR	·	1.2 km	MPC · JPL
213085	1999 TL_{218}	—	October 15, 1999	Socorro	LINEAR	NYS	1.8 km	MPC · JPL
213086	1999 TF_{230}	—	October 3, 1999	Anderson Mesa	LONEOS	·	1.7 km	MPC · JPL
213087	1999 TS_{230}	—	October 5, 1999	Anderson Mesa	LONEOS	PHO	1.3 km	MPC · JPL
213088	1999 TJ_{247}	—	October 8, 1999	Catalina	CSS	(5)	1.7 km	MPC · JPL
213089	1999 TS_{251}	—	October 10, 1999	Socorro	LINEAR	·	1.6 km	MPC · JPL
213090	1999 TY_{282}	—	October 9, 1999	Socorro	LINEAR	·	5.1 km	MPC · JPL
213091	1999 TH_{297}	—	October 2, 1999	Catalina	CSS	·	1.7 km	MPC · JPL
213092	1999 UC_{19}	—	October 30, 1999	Kitt Peak	Spacewatch	·	1.7 km	MPC · JPL
213093	1999 UM_{47}	—	October 29, 1999	Kitt Peak	Spacewatch	·	2.4 km	MPC · JPL
213094	1999 VD_{17}	—	November 2, 1999	Kitt Peak	Spacewatch	·	1.3 km	MPC · JPL
213095	1999 VV_{43}	—	November 1, 1999	Catalina	CSS	THB	5.9 km	MPC · JPL
213096	1999 VA_{88}	—	November 3, 1999	Socorro	LINEAR	·	1.6 km	MPC · JPL
213097	1999 VR_{100}	—	November 9, 1999	Socorro	LINEAR	·	1.8 km	MPC · JPL
213098	1999 VJ_{120}	—	November 4, 1999	Kitt Peak	Spacewatch	NYS	2.0 km	MPC · JPL
213099	1999 VZ_{179}	—	November 6, 1999	Socorro	LINEAR	H	810 m	MPC · JPL
213100	1999 VW_{183}	—	November 14, 1999	Socorro	LINEAR	·	1.2 km	MPC · JPL

== 213101–213200 ==
back to top

Designation			Discovery			Properties		Ref
Permanent	Provisional	Named after	Date	Site	Discoverer(s)	Category	Diam.	Ref
213101	1999 VU_{195}	—	November 3, 1999	Catalina	CSS	·	2.2 km	MPC · JPL
213102	1999 WW_{10}	—	November 29, 1999	Kitt Peak	Spacewatch	H	690 m	MPC · JPL
213103	1999 XK_{3}	—	December 4, 1999	Catalina	CSS	·	1.6 km	MPC · JPL
213104	1999 XF_{26}	—	December 6, 1999	Socorro	LINEAR	·	1.2 km	MPC · JPL
213105	1999 XO_{51}	—	December 7, 1999	Socorro	LINEAR	·	1.8 km	MPC · JPL
213106	1999 XS_{78}	—	December 7, 1999	Socorro	LINEAR	(5)	1.5 km	MPC · JPL
213107	1999 XU_{125}	—	December 7, 1999	Catalina	CSS	·	2.2 km	MPC · JPL
213108	1999 XY_{144}	—	December 7, 1999	Kitt Peak	Spacewatch	SYL · CYB	6.2 km	MPC · JPL
213109	1999 XX_{178}	—	December 10, 1999	Socorro	LINEAR	·	3.1 km	MPC · JPL
213110	1999 YF_{27}	—	December 31, 1999	Kitt Peak	Spacewatch	·	2.0 km	MPC · JPL
213111	2000 AS_{3}	—	January 2, 2000	Socorro	LINEAR	·	2.5 km	MPC · JPL
213112	2000 AM_{12}	—	January 3, 2000	Socorro	LINEAR	·	2.1 km	MPC · JPL
213113	2000 AX_{56}	—	January 4, 2000	Socorro	LINEAR	·	1.5 km	MPC · JPL
213114	2000 AH_{58}	—	January 4, 2000	Socorro	LINEAR	·	2.0 km	MPC · JPL
213115	2000 AL_{87}	—	January 5, 2000	Socorro	LINEAR	·	2.3 km	MPC · JPL
213116	2000 AF_{131}	—	January 6, 2000	Socorro	LINEAR	·	2.4 km	MPC · JPL
213117	2000 AU_{148}	—	January 7, 2000	Socorro	LINEAR	·	1.4 km	MPC · JPL
213118	2000 AL_{183}	—	January 7, 2000	Socorro	LINEAR	·	9.1 km	MPC · JPL
213119	2000 AT_{220}	—	January 8, 2000	Kitt Peak	Spacewatch	L4	10 km	MPC · JPL
213120	2000 BU_{37}	—	January 27, 2000	Kitt Peak	Spacewatch	·	6.4 km	MPC · JPL
213121	2000 CT_{9}	—	February 2, 2000	Socorro	LINEAR	·	1.7 km	MPC · JPL
213122	2000 CO_{11}	—	February 2, 2000	Socorro	LINEAR	·	1.7 km	MPC · JPL
213123	2000 CC_{60}	—	February 2, 2000	Socorro	LINEAR	·	2.7 km	MPC · JPL
213124	2000 CD_{74}	—	February 7, 2000	Kitt Peak	Spacewatch	·	3.6 km	MPC · JPL
213125	2000 CW_{79}	—	February 8, 2000	Kitt Peak	Spacewatch	·	2.0 km	MPC · JPL
213126	2000 CB_{115}	—	February 1, 2000	Catalina	CSS	·	4.3 km	MPC · JPL
213127	2000 DP_{3}	—	February 28, 2000	Baton Rouge	W. R. Cooney Jr.	·	2.3 km	MPC · JPL
213128	2000 DX_{24}	—	February 29, 2000	Socorro	LINEAR	·	3.0 km	MPC · JPL
213129	2000 DY_{43}	—	February 29, 2000	Socorro	LINEAR	·	2.6 km	MPC · JPL
213130	2000 DE_{44}	—	February 29, 2000	Socorro	LINEAR	ADE	2.9 km	MPC · JPL
213131	2000 DV_{92}	—	February 28, 2000	Kitt Peak	Spacewatch	·	2.1 km	MPC · JPL
213132	2000 ER_{24}	—	March 8, 2000	Kitt Peak	Spacewatch	·	2.4 km	MPC · JPL
213133	2000 ES_{66}	—	March 10, 2000	Socorro	LINEAR	JUN	1.4 km	MPC · JPL
213134	2000 EE_{108}	—	March 8, 2000	Socorro	LINEAR	·	3.0 km	MPC · JPL
213135	2000 EV_{151}	—	March 6, 2000	Haleakala	NEAT	·	2.7 km	MPC · JPL
213136	2000 EV_{199}	—	March 1, 2000	Catalina	CSS	ADE	3.6 km	MPC · JPL
213137	2000 FQ_{33}	—	March 29, 2000	Socorro	LINEAR	EUN	2.2 km	MPC · JPL
213138	2000 FY_{62}	—	March 27, 2000	Anderson Mesa	LONEOS	·	2.8 km	MPC · JPL
213139	2000 GH_{23}	—	April 5, 2000	Socorro	LINEAR	·	2.4 km	MPC · JPL
213140	2000 GG_{40}	—	April 5, 2000	Socorro	LINEAR	·	2.9 km	MPC · JPL
213141	2000 GF_{156}	—	April 6, 2000	Anderson Mesa	LONEOS	·	3.3 km	MPC · JPL
213142	2000 HM_{2}	—	April 25, 2000	Kitt Peak	Spacewatch	·	2.3 km	MPC · JPL
213143	2000 HX_{5}	—	April 24, 2000	Kitt Peak	Spacewatch	·	2.4 km	MPC · JPL
213144	2000 HT_{30}	—	April 28, 2000	Socorro	LINEAR	·	3.3 km	MPC · JPL
213145	2000 HW_{41}	—	April 28, 2000	Socorro	LINEAR	·	2.5 km	MPC · JPL
213146	2000 HD_{44}	—	April 25, 2000	Anderson Mesa	LONEOS	·	3.0 km	MPC · JPL
213147	2000 JT_{11}	—	May 4, 2000	Socorro	LINEAR	·	4.6 km	MPC · JPL
213148	2000 JB_{67}	—	May 2, 2000	Kitt Peak	Spacewatch	·	2.9 km	MPC · JPL
213149	2000 JW_{69}	—	May 2, 2000	Anderson Mesa	LONEOS	·	3.3 km	MPC · JPL
213150	2000 KN_{54}	—	May 27, 2000	Anderson Mesa	LONEOS	·	3.7 km	MPC · JPL
213151	2000 KL_{61}	—	May 25, 2000	Anderson Mesa	LONEOS	·	2.6 km	MPC · JPL
213152	2000 NO_{14}	—	July 5, 2000	Anderson Mesa	LONEOS	·	1.2 km	MPC · JPL
213153	2000 ON_{68}	—	July 29, 2000	Anderson Mesa	LONEOS	·	4.7 km	MPC · JPL
213154	2000 PD_{28}	—	August 4, 2000	Haleakala	NEAT	·	1.3 km	MPC · JPL
213155	2000 QN_{10}	—	August 24, 2000	Socorro	LINEAR	·	1.1 km	MPC · JPL
213156	2000 QJ_{25}	—	August 25, 2000	Socorro	LINEAR	H	700 m	MPC · JPL
213157	2000 QY_{42}	—	August 24, 2000	Socorro	LINEAR	·	3.6 km	MPC · JPL
213158	2000 QE_{55}	—	August 25, 2000	Socorro	LINEAR	·	1.5 km	MPC · JPL
213159	2000 QB_{100}	—	August 28, 2000	Socorro	LINEAR	·	940 m	MPC · JPL
213160	2000 QY_{115}	—	August 26, 2000	Socorro	LINEAR	·	1.1 km	MPC · JPL
213161	2000 RR_{24}	—	September 1, 2000	Socorro	LINEAR	·	870 m	MPC · JPL
213162	2000 RF_{44}	—	September 3, 2000	Socorro	LINEAR	·	3.1 km	MPC · JPL
213163	2000 RP_{86}	—	September 2, 2000	Anderson Mesa	LONEOS	·	3.4 km	MPC · JPL
213164	2000 RC_{92}	—	September 3, 2000	Socorro	LINEAR	·	1.2 km	MPC · JPL
213165	2000 RP_{92}	—	September 3, 2000	Socorro	LINEAR	·	1.2 km	MPC · JPL
213166	2000 SM	—	September 19, 2000	Kitt Peak	Spacewatch	THM	3.0 km	MPC · JPL
213167	2000 SR_{21}	—	September 24, 2000	Socorro	LINEAR	H	540 m	MPC · JPL
213168	2000 SU_{37}	—	September 24, 2000	Socorro	LINEAR	·	1.3 km	MPC · JPL
213169	2000 SS_{53}	—	September 24, 2000	Socorro	LINEAR	·	4.2 km	MPC · JPL
213170	2000 SD_{62}	—	September 24, 2000	Socorro	LINEAR	·	1.4 km	MPC · JPL
213171	2000 SE_{63}	—	September 24, 2000	Socorro	LINEAR	·	1.2 km	MPC · JPL
213172	2000 SH_{75}	—	September 24, 2000	Socorro	LINEAR	EOS	3.6 km	MPC · JPL
213173	2000 ST_{102}	—	September 24, 2000	Socorro	LINEAR	·	1.2 km	MPC · JPL
213174	2000 SF_{104}	—	September 24, 2000	Socorro	LINEAR	·	1.2 km	MPC · JPL
213175	2000 SX_{107}	—	September 24, 2000	Socorro	LINEAR	·	900 m	MPC · JPL
213176	2000 SK_{120}	—	September 24, 2000	Socorro	LINEAR	·	3.7 km	MPC · JPL
213177	2000 SW_{125}	—	September 24, 2000	Socorro	LINEAR	·	2.0 km	MPC · JPL
213178	2000 SF_{145}	—	September 24, 2000	Socorro	LINEAR	·	1.1 km	MPC · JPL
213179	2000 SR_{162}	—	September 25, 2000	Haleakala	NEAT	·	1.1 km	MPC · JPL
213180	2000 SD_{173}	—	September 28, 2000	Socorro	LINEAR	L5	17 km	MPC · JPL
213181	2000 SN_{191}	—	September 24, 2000	Socorro	LINEAR	·	2.7 km	MPC · JPL
213182	2000 SO_{198}	—	September 24, 2000	Socorro	LINEAR	·	4.6 km	MPC · JPL
213183	2000 ST_{217}	—	September 26, 2000	Socorro	LINEAR	·	1.4 km	MPC · JPL
213184	2000 SQ_{222}	—	September 26, 2000	Socorro	LINEAR	·	1.7 km	MPC · JPL
213185	2000 SS_{230}	—	September 28, 2000	Socorro	LINEAR	·	1.2 km	MPC · JPL
213186	2000 SN_{239}	—	September 27, 2000	Socorro	LINEAR	·	1.1 km	MPC · JPL
213187	2000 SS_{245}	—	September 24, 2000	Socorro	LINEAR	·	2.2 km	MPC · JPL
213188	2000 SM_{248}	—	September 24, 2000	Socorro	LINEAR	·	4.7 km	MPC · JPL
213189	2000 SH_{264}	—	September 26, 2000	Socorro	LINEAR	THM	3.8 km	MPC · JPL
213190	2000 ST_{277}	—	September 30, 2000	Socorro	LINEAR	·	1.4 km	MPC · JPL
213191	2000 SG_{280}	—	September 28, 2000	Socorro	LINEAR	·	6.4 km	MPC · JPL
213192	2000 SO_{281}	—	September 23, 2000	Socorro	LINEAR	·	2.5 km	MPC · JPL
213193	2000 SB_{322}	—	September 28, 2000	Kitt Peak	Spacewatch	·	1.2 km	MPC · JPL
213194	2000 SD_{328}	—	September 30, 2000	Socorro	LINEAR	EOS	3.2 km	MPC · JPL
213195	2000 SP_{328}	—	September 30, 2000	Kitt Peak	Spacewatch	·	1.1 km	MPC · JPL
213196	2000 SU_{343}	—	September 23, 2000	Socorro	LINEAR	·	3.7 km	MPC · JPL
213197 Lessac-Chenen	2000 SW_{345}	Lessac-Chenen	September 20, 2000	Kitt Peak	M. W. Buie	·	2.8 km	MPC · JPL
213198	2000 SJ_{353}	—	September 30, 2000	Anderson Mesa	LONEOS	·	4.4 km	MPC · JPL
213199	2000 SB_{358}	—	September 28, 2000	Anderson Mesa	LONEOS	·	5.8 km	MPC · JPL
213200	2000 SV_{364}	—	September 21, 2000	Anderson Mesa	LONEOS	·	5.0 km	MPC · JPL

== 213201–213300 ==
back to top

Designation			Discovery			Properties		Ref
Permanent	Provisional	Named after	Date	Site	Discoverer(s)	Category	Diam.	Ref
213201	2000 SA_{367}	—	September 23, 2000	Anderson Mesa	LONEOS	·	1.4 km	MPC · JPL
213202	2000 TC_{4}	—	October 1, 2000	Socorro	LINEAR	NYS	1.2 km	MPC · JPL
213203	2000 TT_{5}	—	October 1, 2000	Socorro	LINEAR	·	940 m	MPC · JPL
213204	2000 TR_{13}	—	October 1, 2000	Socorro	LINEAR	·	4.1 km	MPC · JPL
213205	2000 TZ_{22}	—	October 1, 2000	Socorro	LINEAR	·	900 m	MPC · JPL
213206	2000 TB_{35}	—	October 6, 2000	Anderson Mesa	LONEOS	EOS	2.3 km	MPC · JPL
213207	2000 TN_{40}	—	October 1, 2000	Socorro	LINEAR	·	1.2 km	MPC · JPL
213208	2000 UM_{21}	—	October 24, 2000	Socorro	LINEAR	·	1.4 km	MPC · JPL
213209	2000 UH_{28}	—	October 25, 2000	Socorro	LINEAR	EOS	3.1 km	MPC · JPL
213210	2000 UK_{49}	—	October 24, 2000	Socorro	LINEAR	·	5.1 km	MPC · JPL
213211	2000 UU_{57}	—	October 25, 2000	Socorro	LINEAR	·	4.0 km	MPC · JPL
213212	2000 UA_{69}	—	October 25, 2000	Socorro	LINEAR	·	3.9 km	MPC · JPL
213213	2000 UL_{75}	—	October 31, 2000	Socorro	LINEAR	·	1.0 km	MPC · JPL
213214	2000 UU_{83}	—	October 31, 2000	Socorro	LINEAR	·	1.4 km	MPC · JPL
213215	2000 UX_{85}	—	October 31, 2000	Socorro	LINEAR	·	1.1 km	MPC · JPL
213216	2000 UJ_{92}	—	October 25, 2000	Socorro	LINEAR	·	1.3 km	MPC · JPL
213217	2000 VT_{1}	—	November 1, 2000	Socorro	LINEAR	·	1.2 km	MPC · JPL
213218	2000 VJ_{18}	—	November 1, 2000	Socorro	LINEAR	·	1.2 km	MPC · JPL
213219	2000 VP_{21}	—	November 1, 2000	Socorro	LINEAR	·	1.1 km	MPC · JPL
213220	2000 VB_{25}	—	November 1, 2000	Socorro	LINEAR	·	8.4 km	MPC · JPL
213221	2000 VQ_{26}	—	November 1, 2000	Socorro	LINEAR	NYS	1.3 km	MPC · JPL
213222	2000 VP_{42}	—	November 1, 2000	Socorro	LINEAR	·	5.3 km	MPC · JPL
213223	2000 WR_{11}	—	November 20, 2000	Kitt Peak	Spacewatch	·	1.0 km	MPC · JPL
213224	2000 WU_{16}	—	November 21, 2000	Socorro	LINEAR	·	1.5 km	MPC · JPL
213225	2000 WD_{22}	—	November 20, 2000	Socorro	LINEAR	LIX	5.0 km	MPC · JPL
213226	2000 WQ_{24}	—	November 20, 2000	Socorro	LINEAR	·	2.6 km	MPC · JPL
213227	2000 WD_{43}	—	November 21, 2000	Socorro	LINEAR	·	1.7 km	MPC · JPL
213228	2000 WM_{44}	—	November 21, 2000	Socorro	LINEAR	·	6.5 km	MPC · JPL
213229	2000 WU_{76}	—	November 20, 2000	Socorro	LINEAR	·	4.8 km	MPC · JPL
213230	2000 WP_{85}	—	November 20, 2000	Socorro	LINEAR	·	3.1 km	MPC · JPL
213231	2000 WM_{94}	—	November 21, 2000	Socorro	LINEAR	·	1.4 km	MPC · JPL
213232	2000 WQ_{100}	—	November 21, 2000	Socorro	LINEAR	·	1.1 km	MPC · JPL
213233	2000 WL_{112}	—	November 20, 2000	Socorro	LINEAR	·	1.7 km	MPC · JPL
213234	2000 WD_{139}	—	November 21, 2000	Socorro	LINEAR	·	4.0 km	MPC · JPL
213235	2000 WH_{177}	—	November 27, 2000	Socorro	LINEAR	·	1.1 km	MPC · JPL
213236	2000 XT_{11}	—	December 4, 2000	Socorro	LINEAR	·	3.6 km	MPC · JPL
213237	2000 XZ_{19}	—	December 4, 2000	Socorro	LINEAR	·	7.8 km	MPC · JPL
213238	2000 YU_{9}	—	December 19, 2000	Socorro	LINEAR	·	1.7 km	MPC · JPL
213239	2000 YU_{82}	—	December 30, 2000	Socorro	LINEAR	NYS	1.3 km	MPC · JPL
213240	2000 YJ_{88}	—	December 30, 2000	Socorro	LINEAR	·	1.7 km	MPC · JPL
213241	2001 AL	—	January 1, 2001	Kitt Peak	Spacewatch	·	2.4 km	MPC · JPL
213242	2001 BY_{14}	—	January 21, 2001	Oizumi	T. Kobayashi	·	1.8 km	MPC · JPL
213243	2001 BR_{17}	—	January 19, 2001	Socorro	LINEAR	NYS	1.5 km	MPC · JPL
213244	2001 BN_{20}	—	January 19, 2001	Socorro	LINEAR	·	2.1 km	MPC · JPL
213245	2001 BD_{29}	—	January 20, 2001	Socorro	LINEAR	·	2.0 km	MPC · JPL
213246	2001 BP_{50}	—	January 26, 2001	Ondřejov	P. Kušnirák, P. Pravec	MAS	730 m	MPC · JPL
213247	2001 BJ_{53}	—	January 17, 2001	Haleakala	NEAT	·	1.8 km	MPC · JPL
213248	2001 CK_{10}	—	February 1, 2001	Socorro	LINEAR	·	2.8 km	MPC · JPL
213249	2001 CH_{23}	—	February 1, 2001	Anderson Mesa	LONEOS	·	1.8 km	MPC · JPL
213250	2001 CX_{35}	—	February 14, 2001	Črni Vrh	Skvarč, J.	·	4.6 km	MPC · JPL
213251	2001 CS_{41}	—	February 15, 2001	Ondřejov	P. Pravec, L. Kotková	MAS	1.1 km	MPC · JPL
213252	2001 DO_{1}	—	February 16, 2001	Kitt Peak	Spacewatch	V	1.1 km	MPC · JPL
213253	2001 DP_{32}	—	February 17, 2001	Socorro	LINEAR	·	2.1 km	MPC · JPL
213254	2001 DV_{100}	—	February 16, 2001	Socorro	LINEAR	·	1.8 km	MPC · JPL
213255 Kimiyayui	2001 EZ_{15}	Kimiyayui	March 15, 2001	Kuma Kogen	A. Nakamura	H	680 m	MPC · JPL
213256	2001 EK_{16}	—	March 15, 2001	Haleakala	NEAT	BRA	2.6 km	MPC · JPL
213257	2001 EA_{23}	—	March 15, 2001	Kitt Peak	Spacewatch	NYS	1.7 km	MPC · JPL
213258	2001 FT_{32}	—	March 18, 2001	Socorro	LINEAR	H	800 m	MPC · JPL
213259	2001 FK_{43}	—	March 18, 2001	Socorro	LINEAR	·	1.5 km	MPC · JPL
213260	2001 FZ_{51}	—	March 18, 2001	Socorro	LINEAR	·	2.5 km	MPC · JPL
213261	2001 FL_{115}	—	March 19, 2001	Socorro	LINEAR	RAF	1.4 km	MPC · JPL
213262	2001 FB_{148}	—	March 24, 2001	Socorro	LINEAR	·	2.1 km	MPC · JPL
213263	2001 FD_{166}	—	March 19, 2001	Anderson Mesa	LONEOS	·	3.7 km	MPC · JPL
213264	2001 FG_{196}	—	March 26, 2001	Haleakala	NEAT	·	2.2 km	MPC · JPL
213265	2001 GA_{6}	—	April 14, 2001	Kitt Peak	Spacewatch	H	740 m	MPC · JPL
213266	2001 KE_{32}	—	May 23, 2001	Socorro	LINEAR	H	870 m	MPC · JPL
213267	2001 LB_{9}	—	June 15, 2001	Socorro	LINEAR	·	2.5 km	MPC · JPL
213268	2001 LZ_{12}	—	June 15, 2001	Socorro	LINEAR	·	4.0 km	MPC · JPL
213269 Angelbarbero	2001 MO_{2}	Angelbarbero	June 20, 2001	Calar Alto	Calar Alto	·	2.2 km	MPC · JPL
213270	2001 NM	—	July 9, 2001	Palomar	NEAT	·	2.3 km	MPC · JPL
213271	2001 NT_{5}	—	July 13, 2001	Palomar	NEAT	·	1.9 km	MPC · JPL
213272	2001 NO_{12}	—	July 13, 2001	Haleakala	NEAT	·	2.0 km	MPC · JPL
213273	2001 NB_{18}	—	July 9, 2001	Palomar	NEAT	·	1.7 km	MPC · JPL
213274	2001 OZ_{34}	—	July 19, 2001	Palomar	NEAT	·	3.7 km	MPC · JPL
213275	2001 OK_{40}	—	July 20, 2001	Palomar	NEAT	·	1.9 km	MPC · JPL
213276	2001 OD_{45}	—	July 16, 2001	Anderson Mesa	LONEOS	ADE	4.3 km	MPC · JPL
213277	2001 OJ_{77}	—	July 27, 2001	Palomar	NEAT	H	820 m	MPC · JPL
213278	2001 OG_{90}	—	July 25, 2001	Kitt Peak	Spacewatch	(5)	1.9 km	MPC · JPL
213279	2001 ON_{111}	—	July 22, 2001	Anderson Mesa	LONEOS	·	3.5 km	MPC · JPL
213280	2001 PP_{10}	—	August 8, 2001	Haleakala	NEAT	·	2.3 km	MPC · JPL
213281	2001 PE_{11}	—	August 9, 2001	Palomar	NEAT	·	2.5 km	MPC · JPL
213282	2001 PA_{25}	—	August 11, 2001	Haleakala	NEAT	LEO	2.8 km	MPC · JPL
213283	2001 PE_{27}	—	August 11, 2001	Haleakala	NEAT	·	3.4 km	MPC · JPL
213284	2001 PT_{48}	—	August 14, 2001	Palomar	NEAT	·	2.5 km	MPC · JPL
213285	2001 QY_{26}	—	August 16, 2001	Socorro	LINEAR	GAL	2.8 km	MPC · JPL
213286	2001 QV_{32}	—	August 17, 2001	Palomar	NEAT	·	2.7 km	MPC · JPL
213287	2001 QQ_{59}	—	August 18, 2001	Socorro	LINEAR	·	2.1 km	MPC · JPL
213288	2001 QE_{95}	—	August 22, 2001	Kitt Peak	Spacewatch	·	2.0 km	MPC · JPL
213289	2001 QK_{100}	—	August 21, 2001	Palomar	NEAT	(5)	1.6 km	MPC · JPL
213290	2001 QE_{113}	—	August 25, 2001	Socorro	LINEAR	·	2.6 km	MPC · JPL
213291	2001 QF_{123}	—	August 19, 2001	Socorro	LINEAR	·	2.6 km	MPC · JPL
213292	2001 QX_{127}	—	August 20, 2001	Socorro	LINEAR	·	2.1 km	MPC · JPL
213293	2001 QY_{154}	—	August 23, 2001	Anderson Mesa	LONEOS	·	3.6 km	MPC · JPL
213294	2001 QA_{162}	—	August 23, 2001	Anderson Mesa	LONEOS	NEM	2.7 km	MPC · JPL
213295	2001 QZ_{209}	—	August 23, 2001	Anderson Mesa	LONEOS	·	2.3 km	MPC · JPL
213296	2001 QV_{213}	—	August 23, 2001	Anderson Mesa	LONEOS	NEM	2.9 km	MPC · JPL
213297	2001 QS_{249}	—	August 24, 2001	Haleakala	NEAT	·	2.5 km	MPC · JPL
213298	2001 QG_{273}	—	August 19, 2001	Socorro	LINEAR	·	2.4 km	MPC · JPL
213299	2001 QS_{273}	—	August 19, 2001	Socorro	LINEAR	·	2.7 km	MPC · JPL
213300	2001 QM_{280}	—	August 19, 2001	Socorro	LINEAR	·	1.8 km	MPC · JPL

== 213301–213400 ==
back to top

Designation			Discovery			Properties		Ref
Permanent	Provisional	Named after	Date	Site	Discoverer(s)	Category	Diam.	Ref
213301	2001 QS_{294}	—	August 24, 2001	Anderson Mesa	LONEOS	·	2.6 km	MPC · JPL
213302	2001 QL_{328}	—	August 27, 2001	Palomar	NEAT	·	3.1 km	MPC · JPL
213303	2001 QM_{328}	—	August 27, 2001	Palomar	NEAT	·	4.4 km	MPC · JPL
213304	2001 RL_{27}	—	September 7, 2001	Socorro	LINEAR	·	2.7 km	MPC · JPL
213305	2001 RD_{50}	—	September 10, 2001	Socorro	LINEAR	GEF	1.9 km	MPC · JPL
213306	2001 RR_{59}	—	September 12, 2001	Socorro	LINEAR	GEF	1.7 km	MPC · JPL
213307	2001 RB_{65}	—	September 10, 2001	Socorro	LINEAR	·	5.0 km	MPC · JPL
213308	2001 RQ_{79}	—	September 10, 2001	Socorro	LINEAR	·	3.5 km	MPC · JPL
213309	2001 RV_{80}	—	September 15, 2001	Palomar	NEAT	·	2.3 km	MPC · JPL
213310	2001 RN_{90}	—	September 11, 2001	Anderson Mesa	LONEOS	·	2.2 km	MPC · JPL
213311	2001 RH_{101}	—	September 12, 2001	Socorro	LINEAR	·	3.0 km	MPC · JPL
213312	2001 RB_{115}	—	September 12, 2001	Socorro	LINEAR	AST	2.8 km	MPC · JPL
213313	2001 RL_{136}	—	September 12, 2001	Socorro	LINEAR	MRX	1.9 km	MPC · JPL
213314	2001 SG_{9}	—	September 19, 2001	Fountain Hills	C. W. Juels, P. R. Holvorcem	·	5.6 km	MPC · JPL
213315	2001 SL_{16}	—	September 16, 2001	Socorro	LINEAR	AEO	2.0 km	MPC · JPL
213316	2001 SK_{19}	—	September 16, 2001	Socorro	LINEAR	·	2.9 km	MPC · JPL
213317	2001 ST_{32}	—	September 16, 2001	Socorro	LINEAR	EOS	2.6 km	MPC · JPL
213318	2001 SN_{40}	—	September 16, 2001	Socorro	LINEAR	·	2.8 km	MPC · JPL
213319	2001 ST_{63}	—	September 17, 2001	Socorro	LINEAR	GEF	2.1 km	MPC · JPL
213320	2001 SQ_{97}	—	September 20, 2001	Socorro	LINEAR	ELF	5.6 km	MPC · JPL
213321	2001 SG_{119}	—	September 16, 2001	Socorro	LINEAR	·	2.9 km	MPC · JPL
213322	2001 SN_{121}	—	September 16, 2001	Socorro	LINEAR	·	3.7 km	MPC · JPL
213323	2001 SA_{127}	—	September 16, 2001	Socorro	LINEAR	·	2.4 km	MPC · JPL
213324	2001 SP_{127}	—	September 16, 2001	Socorro	LINEAR	·	3.4 km	MPC · JPL
213325	2001 SV_{132}	—	September 16, 2001	Socorro	LINEAR	·	2.7 km	MPC · JPL
213326	2001 SC_{138}	—	September 16, 2001	Socorro	LINEAR	KOR	1.8 km	MPC · JPL
213327	2001 SM_{138}	—	September 16, 2001	Socorro	LINEAR	·	2.6 km	MPC · JPL
213328	2001 SF_{139}	—	September 16, 2001	Socorro	LINEAR	·	3.2 km	MPC · JPL
213329	2001 SE_{140}	—	September 16, 2001	Socorro	LINEAR	GEF	1.7 km	MPC · JPL
213330	2001 SX_{141}	—	September 16, 2001	Socorro	LINEAR	·	2.3 km	MPC · JPL
213331	2001 SG_{146}	—	September 16, 2001	Socorro	LINEAR	·	3.1 km	MPC · JPL
213332	2001 SV_{148}	—	September 17, 2001	Socorro	LINEAR	·	1.1 km	MPC · JPL
213333	2001 SX_{154}	—	September 17, 2001	Socorro	LINEAR	·	3.4 km	MPC · JPL
213334	2001 SW_{159}	—	September 17, 2001	Socorro	LINEAR	·	3.3 km	MPC · JPL
213335	2001 SJ_{166}	—	September 19, 2001	Socorro	LINEAR	·	2.5 km	MPC · JPL
213336	2001 SK_{177}	—	September 16, 2001	Socorro	LINEAR	·	2.4 km	MPC · JPL
213337	2001 SE_{209}	—	September 19, 2001	Socorro	LINEAR	·	2.7 km	MPC · JPL
213338	2001 SH_{214}	—	September 19, 2001	Socorro	LINEAR	·	3.0 km	MPC · JPL
213339	2001 SG_{216}	—	September 19, 2001	Socorro	LINEAR	·	2.3 km	MPC · JPL
213340	2001 SU_{219}	—	September 19, 2001	Socorro	LINEAR	·	1.4 km	MPC · JPL
213341	2001 SR_{245}	—	September 19, 2001	Socorro	LINEAR	·	2.8 km	MPC · JPL
213342	2001 SB_{251}	—	September 19, 2001	Socorro	LINEAR	KOR · fast	2.1 km	MPC · JPL
213343	2001 SS_{274}	—	September 20, 2001	Kitt Peak	Spacewatch	·	1.9 km	MPC · JPL
213344	2001 ST_{302}	—	September 20, 2001	Socorro	LINEAR	AGN	1.3 km	MPC · JPL
213345	2001 SW_{302}	—	September 20, 2001	Socorro	LINEAR	HOF	3.0 km	MPC · JPL
213346	2001 SG_{303}	—	September 20, 2001	Socorro	LINEAR	EOS	2.5 km	MPC · JPL
213347	2001 SD_{304}	—	September 20, 2001	Socorro	LINEAR	L5	10 km	MPC · JPL
213348	2001 SC_{308}	—	September 21, 2001	Socorro	LINEAR	·	3.2 km	MPC · JPL
213349	2001 SD_{327}	—	September 18, 2001	Anderson Mesa	LONEOS	·	2.6 km	MPC · JPL
213350	2001 SO_{327}	—	September 18, 2001	Anderson Mesa	LONEOS	KOR	1.9 km	MPC · JPL
213351	2001 SC_{333}	—	September 19, 2001	Socorro	LINEAR	L5	10 km	MPC · JPL
213352	2001 SJ_{341}	—	September 21, 2001	Socorro	LINEAR	·	2.2 km	MPC · JPL
213353	2001 TJ_{2}	—	October 6, 2001	Palomar	NEAT	·	2.5 km	MPC · JPL
213354	2001 TJ_{12}	—	October 13, 2001	Socorro	LINEAR	·	2.9 km	MPC · JPL
213355	2001 TE_{15}	—	October 11, 2001	Palomar	NEAT	·	1.7 km	MPC · JPL
213356	2001 TV_{52}	—	October 13, 2001	Socorro	LINEAR	·	1.3 km	MPC · JPL
213357	2001 TE_{61}	—	October 13, 2001	Socorro	LINEAR	DOR	3.7 km	MPC · JPL
213358	2001 TO_{73}	—	October 13, 2001	Socorro	LINEAR	·	2.8 km	MPC · JPL
213359	2001 TD_{98}	—	October 14, 2001	Socorro	LINEAR	·	2.9 km	MPC · JPL
213360	2001 TO_{108}	—	October 14, 2001	Socorro	LINEAR	L5	14 km	MPC · JPL
213361	2001 TE_{118}	—	October 15, 2001	Socorro	LINEAR	·	3.5 km	MPC · JPL
213362	2001 TX_{132}	—	October 12, 2001	Haleakala	NEAT	DOR	3.8 km	MPC · JPL
213363	2001 TC_{139}	—	October 10, 2001	Palomar	NEAT	·	3.4 km	MPC · JPL
213364	2001 TF_{142}	—	October 10, 2001	Palomar	NEAT	·	3.9 km	MPC · JPL
213365	2001 TV_{148}	—	October 10, 2001	Palomar	NEAT	·	2.5 km	MPC · JPL
213366	2001 TS_{156}	—	October 14, 2001	Kitt Peak	Spacewatch	·	2.5 km	MPC · JPL
213367	2001 TS_{173}	—	October 14, 2001	Socorro	LINEAR	·	2.6 km	MPC · JPL
213368	2001 TV_{179}	—	October 14, 2001	Socorro	LINEAR	·	2.5 km	MPC · JPL
213369	2001 TY_{180}	—	October 14, 2001	Socorro	LINEAR	·	6.2 km	MPC · JPL
213370	2001 TC_{206}	—	October 11, 2001	Socorro	LINEAR	·	5.4 km	MPC · JPL
213371	2001 TY_{210}	—	October 13, 2001	Palomar	NEAT	·	3.4 km	MPC · JPL
213372	2001 TW_{226}	—	October 14, 2001	Kitt Peak	Spacewatch	·	3.2 km	MPC · JPL
213373	2001 TN_{230}	—	October 15, 2001	Kitt Peak	Spacewatch	·	2.6 km	MPC · JPL
213374	2001 TA_{246}	—	October 14, 2001	Apache Point	SDSS	(16286)	2.2 km	MPC · JPL
213375	2001 TC_{246}	—	October 14, 2001	Apache Point	SDSS	·	2.5 km	MPC · JPL
213376	2001 UA_{24}	—	October 18, 2001	Socorro	LINEAR	TIR	3.9 km	MPC · JPL
213377	2001 UL_{27}	—	October 18, 2001	Palomar	NEAT	AGN	1.9 km	MPC · JPL
213378	2001 UG_{29}	—	October 16, 2001	Socorro	LINEAR	NAE	5.1 km	MPC · JPL
213379	2001 UU_{42}	—	October 17, 2001	Socorro	LINEAR	·	3.1 km	MPC · JPL
213380	2001 UB_{43}	—	October 17, 2001	Socorro	LINEAR	·	2.3 km	MPC · JPL
213381	2001 UB_{45}	—	October 17, 2001	Socorro	LINEAR	·	4.1 km	MPC · JPL
213382	2001 UW_{50}	—	October 17, 2001	Socorro	LINEAR	·	4.1 km	MPC · JPL
213383	2001 UP_{62}	—	October 17, 2001	Socorro	LINEAR	·	2.3 km	MPC · JPL
213384	2001 UF_{72}	—	October 20, 2001	Haleakala	NEAT	·	3.1 km	MPC · JPL
213385	2001 US_{81}	—	October 20, 2001	Socorro	LINEAR	·	3.7 km	MPC · JPL
213386	2001 UV_{96}	—	October 17, 2001	Socorro	LINEAR	THM	3.1 km	MPC · JPL
213387	2001 UG_{115}	—	October 22, 2001	Socorro	LINEAR	EOS	2.3 km	MPC · JPL
213388	2001 UO_{130}	—	October 20, 2001	Socorro	LINEAR	·	2.6 km	MPC · JPL
213389	2001 UY_{136}	—	October 23, 2001	Socorro	LINEAR	THM	2.7 km	MPC · JPL
213390	2001 UF_{144}	—	October 23, 2001	Socorro	LINEAR	·	3.2 km	MPC · JPL
213391	2001 UF_{160}	—	October 23, 2001	Socorro	LINEAR	·	1.6 km	MPC · JPL
213392	2001 UY_{161}	—	October 23, 2001	Socorro	LINEAR	·	3.9 km	MPC · JPL
213393	2001 UR_{172}	—	October 18, 2001	Palomar	NEAT	·	2.3 km	MPC · JPL
213394	2001 US_{187}	—	October 17, 2001	Palomar	NEAT	L5	10 km	MPC · JPL
213395	2001 UN_{190}	—	October 18, 2001	Palomar	NEAT	·	2.3 km	MPC · JPL
213396	2001 UA_{198}	—	October 19, 2001	Anderson Mesa	LONEOS	·	2.5 km	MPC · JPL
213397	2001 US_{203}	—	October 19, 2001	Palomar	NEAT	·	2.9 km	MPC · JPL
213398	2001 UK_{219}	—	October 28, 2001	Palomar	NEAT	·	3.1 km	MPC · JPL
213399	2001 UJ_{228}	—	October 25, 2001	Palomar	NEAT	·	2.0 km	MPC · JPL
213400	2001 VC_{3}	—	November 9, 2001	Kitt Peak	Spacewatch	·	2.9 km	MPC · JPL

== 213401–213500 ==
back to top

Designation			Discovery			Properties		Ref
Permanent	Provisional	Named after	Date	Site	Discoverer(s)	Category	Diam.	Ref
213401	2001 VS_{56}	—	November 10, 2001	Socorro	LINEAR	DOR	4.5 km	MPC · JPL
213402	2001 VH_{111}	—	November 12, 2001	Socorro	LINEAR	·	4.2 km	MPC · JPL
213403	2001 WT	—	November 16, 2001	Kitt Peak	Spacewatch	THM	2.9 km	MPC · JPL
213404	2001 WH_{3}	—	November 16, 2001	Kitt Peak	Spacewatch	·	4.8 km	MPC · JPL
213405	2001 WM_{8}	—	November 17, 2001	Socorro	LINEAR	615 ·	2.3 km	MPC · JPL
213406	2001 WB_{17}	—	November 17, 2001	Socorro	LINEAR	·	2.5 km	MPC · JPL
213407	2001 WQ_{23}	—	November 17, 2001	Kitt Peak	Spacewatch	·	2.7 km	MPC · JPL
213408	2001 WJ_{26}	—	November 17, 2001	Socorro	LINEAR	T_{j} (2.97)	6.5 km	MPC · JPL
213409	2001 WW_{29}	—	November 17, 2001	Socorro	LINEAR	·	4.9 km	MPC · JPL
213410	2001 WN_{53}	—	November 19, 2001	Socorro	LINEAR	·	2.8 km	MPC · JPL
213411	2001 WB_{58}	—	November 19, 2001	Socorro	LINEAR	·	2.9 km	MPC · JPL
213412	2001 WG_{68}	—	November 20, 2001	Socorro	LINEAR	·	2.3 km	MPC · JPL
213413	2001 WR_{75}	—	November 20, 2001	Socorro	LINEAR	·	3.3 km	MPC · JPL
213414	2001 WU_{81}	—	November 20, 2001	Socorro	LINEAR	·	4.6 km	MPC · JPL
213415	2001 WJ_{87}	—	November 19, 2001	Socorro	LINEAR	DOR	4.1 km	MPC · JPL
213416	2001 XL_{10}	—	December 9, 2001	Socorro	LINEAR	HYG	3.8 km	MPC · JPL
213417	2001 XZ_{30}	—	December 7, 2001	Cima Ekar	ADAS	·	4.5 km	MPC · JPL
213418	2001 XS_{32}	—	December 10, 2001	Kitt Peak	Spacewatch	·	5.8 km	MPC · JPL
213419	2001 XK_{38}	—	December 9, 2001	Socorro	LINEAR	·	3.5 km	MPC · JPL
213420	2001 XJ_{39}	—	December 9, 2001	Socorro	LINEAR	·	3.4 km	MPC · JPL
213421	2001 XO_{55}	—	December 10, 2001	Socorro	LINEAR	·	870 m	MPC · JPL
213422	2001 XR_{71}	—	December 11, 2001	Socorro	LINEAR	URS	5.0 km	MPC · JPL
213423	2001 XL_{88}	—	December 14, 2001	Kitt Peak	Spacewatch	·	1.4 km	MPC · JPL
213424	2001 XS_{88}	—	December 13, 2001	Uccle	H. M. J. Boffin	·	4.3 km	MPC · JPL
213425	2001 XS_{94}	—	December 10, 2001	Socorro	LINEAR	·	1.3 km	MPC · JPL
213426	2001 XN_{126}	—	December 14, 2001	Socorro	LINEAR	EOS	2.5 km	MPC · JPL
213427	2001 XS_{137}	—	December 14, 2001	Socorro	LINEAR	·	3.1 km	MPC · JPL
213428	2001 XV_{182}	—	December 14, 2001	Socorro	LINEAR	·	1.1 km	MPC · JPL
213429	2001 XQ_{200}	—	December 15, 2001	Socorro	LINEAR	·	4.7 km	MPC · JPL
213430	2001 XP_{201}	—	December 14, 2001	Bergisch Gladbach	W. Bickel	NYS	1.7 km	MPC · JPL
213431	2001 XX_{224}	—	December 15, 2001	Socorro	LINEAR	·	1.8 km	MPC · JPL
213432	2001 XL_{240}	—	December 15, 2001	Socorro	LINEAR	fast	2.4 km	MPC · JPL
213433	2001 XM_{258}	—	December 8, 2001	Anderson Mesa	LONEOS	·	3.9 km	MPC · JPL
213434	2001 XX_{258}	—	December 8, 2001	Anderson Mesa	LONEOS	·	4.2 km	MPC · JPL
213435	2001 YJ_{6}	—	December 17, 2001	Kitt Peak	Spacewatch	·	4.4 km	MPC · JPL
213436	2001 YN_{6}	—	December 20, 2001	Cima Ekar	ADAS	EOS	2.6 km	MPC · JPL
213437	2001 YU_{12}	—	December 17, 2001	Socorro	LINEAR	·	1.1 km	MPC · JPL
213438	2001 YV_{16}	—	December 17, 2001	Socorro	LINEAR	·	3.8 km	MPC · JPL
213439	2001 YF_{25}	—	December 18, 2001	Socorro	LINEAR	·	2.7 km	MPC · JPL
213440	2001 YE_{121}	—	December 17, 2001	Socorro	LINEAR	·	4.9 km	MPC · JPL
213441	2002 AU_{6}	—	January 5, 2002	Cima Ekar	ADAS	·	3.8 km	MPC · JPL
213442	2002 AD_{23}	—	January 5, 2002	Haleakala	NEAT	·	860 m	MPC · JPL
213443	2002 AD_{24}	—	January 7, 2002	Palomar	NEAT	·	1.3 km	MPC · JPL
213444	2002 AA_{44}	—	January 9, 2002	Socorro	LINEAR	·	3.7 km	MPC · JPL
213445	2002 AE_{51}	—	January 9, 2002	Socorro	LINEAR	·	5.2 km	MPC · JPL
213446	2002 AV_{66}	—	January 13, 2002	Socorro	LINEAR	·	1.2 km	MPC · JPL
213447	2002 AK_{144}	—	January 13, 2002	Socorro	LINEAR	·	1.2 km	MPC · JPL
213448	2002 AA_{155}	—	January 14, 2002	Socorro	LINEAR	·	1.7 km	MPC · JPL
213449	2002 AD_{176}	—	January 14, 2002	Socorro	LINEAR	·	1.1 km	MPC · JPL
213450	2002 CZ_{11}	—	February 6, 2002	Socorro	LINEAR	·	1.3 km	MPC · JPL
213451	2002 CJ_{18}	—	February 6, 2002	Socorro	LINEAR	·	1.3 km	MPC · JPL
213452	2002 CP_{33}	—	February 6, 2002	Socorro	LINEAR	·	1.1 km	MPC · JPL
213453	2002 CH_{37}	—	February 7, 2002	Socorro	LINEAR	·	1.1 km	MPC · JPL
213454	2002 CK_{48}	—	February 3, 2002	Haleakala	NEAT	·	890 m	MPC · JPL
213455	2002 CP_{54}	—	February 7, 2002	Socorro	LINEAR	·	1.0 km	MPC · JPL
213456	2002 CP_{119}	—	February 7, 2002	Socorro	LINEAR	·	950 m	MPC · JPL
213457	2002 CF_{152}	—	February 10, 2002	Socorro	LINEAR	·	860 m	MPC · JPL
213458	2002 CB_{170}	—	February 8, 2002	Socorro	LINEAR	·	880 m	MPC · JPL
213459	2002 CX_{172}	—	February 8, 2002	Socorro	LINEAR	·	4.7 km	MPC · JPL
213460	2002 CE_{184}	—	February 10, 2002	Socorro	LINEAR	·	810 m	MPC · JPL
213461	2002 CM_{197}	—	February 10, 2002	Socorro	LINEAR	·	900 m	MPC · JPL
213462	2002 CQ_{198}	—	February 10, 2002	Socorro	LINEAR	CYB	4.4 km	MPC · JPL
213463	2002 CF_{232}	—	February 8, 2002	Socorro	LINEAR	·	1.3 km	MPC · JPL
213464	2002 CM_{233}	—	February 11, 2002	Socorro	LINEAR	VER	4.0 km	MPC · JPL
213465	2002 CL_{234}	—	February 8, 2002	Kitt Peak	Spacewatch	LUT	5.9 km	MPC · JPL
213466	2002 CE_{236}	—	February 10, 2002	Kitt Peak	Spacewatch	·	600 m	MPC · JPL
213467	2002 CX_{311}	—	February 12, 2002	Socorro	LINEAR	·	2.3 km	MPC · JPL
213468	2002 EU_{8}	—	March 12, 2002	Črni Vrh	Matičič, S.	·	1.4 km	MPC · JPL
213469	2002 EX_{60}	—	March 13, 2002	Socorro	LINEAR	·	1.3 km	MPC · JPL
213470	2002 ED_{85}	—	March 9, 2002	Socorro	LINEAR	·	1.2 km	MPC · JPL
213471	2002 ES_{90}	—	March 12, 2002	Socorro	LINEAR	·	1.1 km	MPC · JPL
213472	2002 EJ_{95}	—	March 14, 2002	Socorro	LINEAR	·	830 m	MPC · JPL
213473	2002 EJ_{99}	—	March 3, 2002	Haleakala	NEAT	·	1.2 km	MPC · JPL
213474	2002 EU_{115}	—	March 10, 2002	Haleakala	NEAT	(2076)	1.1 km	MPC · JPL
213475	2002 EN_{120}	—	March 11, 2002	Kitt Peak	Spacewatch	·	940 m	MPC · JPL
213476	2002 EZ_{131}	—	March 13, 2002	Kitt Peak	Spacewatch	·	1.2 km	MPC · JPL
213477	2002 EE_{134}	—	March 13, 2002	Palomar	NEAT	·	780 m	MPC · JPL
213478	2002 EQ_{135}	—	March 14, 2002	Anderson Mesa	LONEOS	·	990 m	MPC · JPL
213479	2002 EY_{135}	—	March 12, 2002	Palomar	NEAT	·	1.2 km	MPC · JPL
213480	2002 EV_{148}	—	March 15, 2002	Palomar	NEAT	slow	1.3 km	MPC · JPL
213481	2002 EE_{162}	—	March 5, 2002	Apache Point	SDSS	·	1.2 km	MPC · JPL
213482	2002 FY_{4}	—	March 20, 2002	Socorro	LINEAR	PHO	3.0 km	MPC · JPL
213483	2002 FY_{7}	—	March 16, 2002	Socorro	LINEAR	·	1.1 km	MPC · JPL
213484	2002 FR_{12}	—	March 16, 2002	Socorro	LINEAR	·	1.1 km	MPC · JPL
213485	2002 FD_{15}	—	March 16, 2002	Haleakala	NEAT	·	3.4 km	MPC · JPL
213486	2002 FX_{15}	—	March 16, 2002	Haleakala	NEAT	·	1.5 km	MPC · JPL
213487	2002 FP_{31}	—	March 19, 2002	Anderson Mesa	LONEOS	·	1.1 km	MPC · JPL
213488	2002 FX_{38}	—	March 31, 2002	Palomar	NEAT	PHO	1.3 km	MPC · JPL
213489	2002 GC_{6}	—	April 12, 2002	Haleakala	NEAT	·	1.2 km	MPC · JPL
213490	2002 GO_{13}	—	April 14, 2002	Socorro	LINEAR	·	1.4 km	MPC · JPL
213491	2002 GO_{15}	—	April 15, 2002	Socorro	LINEAR	L4	20 km	MPC · JPL
213492	2002 GX_{26}	—	April 14, 2002	Palomar	NEAT	·	1.5 km	MPC · JPL
213493	2002 GH_{36}	—	April 2, 2002	Kitt Peak	Spacewatch	·	1.3 km	MPC · JPL
213494	2002 GM_{37}	—	April 3, 2002	Kitt Peak	Spacewatch	·	1.8 km	MPC · JPL
213495	2002 GS_{37}	—	April 3, 2002	Kitt Peak	Spacewatch	·	820 m	MPC · JPL
213496	2002 GM_{45}	—	April 4, 2002	Palomar	NEAT	·	830 m	MPC · JPL
213497	2002 GZ_{46}	—	April 5, 2002	Palomar	NEAT	·	1 km	MPC · JPL
213498	2002 GB_{49}	—	April 4, 2002	Palomar	NEAT	·	1.3 km	MPC · JPL
213499	2002 GY_{50}	—	April 5, 2002	Anderson Mesa	LONEOS	(2076)	1.2 km	MPC · JPL
213500	2002 GE_{52}	—	April 5, 2002	Palomar	NEAT	·	830 m	MPC · JPL

== 213501–213600 ==
back to top

Designation			Discovery			Properties		Ref
Permanent	Provisional	Named after	Date	Site	Discoverer(s)	Category	Diam.	Ref
213501	2002 GV_{76}	—	April 9, 2002	Anderson Mesa	LONEOS	V	1.2 km	MPC · JPL
213502	2002 GC_{77}	—	April 9, 2002	Anderson Mesa	LONEOS	·	1.1 km	MPC · JPL
213503	2002 GM_{80}	—	April 10, 2002	Socorro	LINEAR	·	1.2 km	MPC · JPL
213504	2002 GM_{81}	—	April 10, 2002	Socorro	LINEAR	·	1.1 km	MPC · JPL
213505	2002 GM_{85}	—	April 10, 2002	Socorro	LINEAR	·	840 m	MPC · JPL
213506	2002 GS_{85}	—	April 10, 2002	Socorro	LINEAR	V	920 m	MPC · JPL
213507	2002 GR_{86}	—	April 10, 2002	Socorro	LINEAR	·	1.6 km	MPC · JPL
213508	2002 GO_{91}	—	April 9, 2002	Anderson Mesa	LONEOS	V	970 m	MPC · JPL
213509	2002 GU_{91}	—	April 9, 2002	Palomar	NEAT	·	2.7 km	MPC · JPL
213510	2002 GC_{93}	—	April 9, 2002	Socorro	LINEAR	·	1.2 km	MPC · JPL
213511	2002 GH_{98}	—	April 10, 2002	Socorro	LINEAR	V	950 m	MPC · JPL
213512	2002 GC_{119}	—	April 12, 2002	Palomar	NEAT	·	1.0 km	MPC · JPL
213513	2002 GS_{122}	—	April 10, 2002	Socorro	LINEAR	·	1.5 km	MPC · JPL
213514	2002 GT_{126}	—	April 12, 2002	Palomar	NEAT	·	1.3 km	MPC · JPL
213515	2002 GX_{138}	—	April 13, 2002	Palomar	NEAT	CYB	6.3 km	MPC · JPL
213516	2002 GA_{141}	—	April 13, 2002	Kitt Peak	Spacewatch	NYS	800 m	MPC · JPL
213517	2002 GK_{142}	—	April 13, 2002	Palomar	NEAT	NYS	1.3 km	MPC · JPL
213518	2002 GQ_{147}	—	April 13, 2002	Palomar	NEAT	·	1.1 km	MPC · JPL
213519	2002 GF_{149}	—	April 14, 2002	Palomar	NEAT	(2076)	1.2 km	MPC · JPL
213520	2002 GC_{150}	—	April 14, 2002	Socorro	LINEAR	·	710 m	MPC · JPL
213521	2002 GH_{157}	—	April 13, 2002	Palomar	NEAT	·	1.2 km	MPC · JPL
213522	2002 GM_{158}	—	April 13, 2002	Palomar	NEAT	V	830 m	MPC · JPL
213523	2002 GG_{159}	—	April 14, 2002	Socorro	LINEAR	V	850 m	MPC · JPL
213524	2002 GL_{161}	—	April 15, 2002	Anderson Mesa	LONEOS	·	1.3 km	MPC · JPL
213525	2002 GC_{176}	—	April 12, 2002	Socorro	LINEAR	·	1.3 km	MPC · JPL
213526	2002 HW_{1}	—	April 16, 2002	Socorro	LINEAR	·	1.1 km	MPC · JPL
213527	2002 HE_{12}	—	April 29, 2002	Palomar	NEAT	·	1.1 km	MPC · JPL
213528	2002 HV_{13}	—	April 21, 2002	Socorro	LINEAR	PHO	1.4 km	MPC · JPL
213529	2002 HC_{18}	—	April 21, 2002	Kitt Peak	Spacewatch	·	1.2 km	MPC · JPL
213530	2002 JE_{1}	—	May 4, 2002	Eskridge	Farpoint	·	1.8 km	MPC · JPL
213531	2002 JN_{18}	—	May 7, 2002	Palomar	NEAT	·	2.1 km	MPC · JPL
213532	2002 JF_{19}	—	May 7, 2002	Palomar	NEAT	·	1.0 km	MPC · JPL
213533	2002 JV_{19}	—	May 7, 2002	Palomar	NEAT	·	1.4 km	MPC · JPL
213534	2002 JX_{28}	—	May 9, 2002	Socorro	LINEAR	·	2.4 km	MPC · JPL
213535	2002 JT_{29}	—	May 9, 2002	Socorro	LINEAR	NYS	1.1 km	MPC · JPL
213536	2002 JN_{51}	—	May 9, 2002	Socorro	LINEAR	·	1.2 km	MPC · JPL
213537	2002 JD_{55}	—	May 9, 2002	Socorro	LINEAR	·	1.4 km	MPC · JPL
213538	2002 JJ_{63}	—	May 9, 2002	Socorro	LINEAR	·	1.5 km	MPC · JPL
213539	2002 JU_{63}	—	May 9, 2002	Socorro	LINEAR	·	1.5 km	MPC · JPL
213540	2002 JH_{72}	—	May 8, 2002	Socorro	LINEAR	·	2.0 km	MPC · JPL
213541	2002 JL_{75}	—	May 9, 2002	Socorro	LINEAR	·	1.3 km	MPC · JPL
213542	2002 JG_{76}	—	May 11, 2002	Socorro	LINEAR	(2076)	1.0 km	MPC · JPL
213543	2002 JC_{81}	—	May 11, 2002	Socorro	LINEAR	V	1.3 km	MPC · JPL
213544	2002 JZ_{82}	—	May 11, 2002	Socorro	LINEAR	·	930 m	MPC · JPL
213545	2002 JQ_{86}	—	May 11, 2002	Socorro	LINEAR	·	1.3 km	MPC · JPL
213546	2002 JN_{95}	—	May 11, 2002	Socorro	LINEAR	·	1.5 km	MPC · JPL
213547	2002 JR_{98}	—	May 13, 2002	Socorro	LINEAR	·	1.2 km	MPC · JPL
213548	2002 JV_{115}	—	May 7, 2002	Anderson Mesa	LONEOS	·	1.2 km	MPC · JPL
213549	2002 JE_{117}	—	May 4, 2002	Palomar	NEAT	·	1.6 km	MPC · JPL
213550	2002 JG_{128}	—	May 7, 2002	Palomar	NEAT	·	2.6 km	MPC · JPL
213551	2002 JB_{131}	—	May 8, 2002	Socorro	LINEAR	·	2.0 km	MPC · JPL
213552	2002 JJ_{131}	—	May 9, 2002	Socorro	LINEAR	·	4.0 km	MPC · JPL
213553	2002 KW_{4}	—	May 16, 2002	Socorro	LINEAR	·	1.4 km	MPC · JPL
213554	2002 KU_{6}	—	May 27, 2002	Palomar	NEAT	·	1.4 km	MPC · JPL
213555	2002 LQ_{1}	—	June 2, 2002	Palomar	NEAT	·	1.4 km	MPC · JPL
213556	2002 LO_{6}	—	June 1, 2002	Palomar	NEAT	·	1.6 km	MPC · JPL
213557	2002 LE_{7}	—	June 2, 2002	Palomar	NEAT	ERI	1.7 km	MPC · JPL
213558	2002 LE_{10}	—	June 5, 2002	Socorro	LINEAR	(2076)	1.2 km	MPC · JPL
213559	2002 LD_{27}	—	June 7, 2002	Socorro	LINEAR	·	2.5 km	MPC · JPL
213560	2002 LJ_{28}	—	June 9, 2002	Socorro	LINEAR	·	1.7 km	MPC · JPL
213561	2002 LS_{29}	—	June 9, 2002	Haleakala	NEAT	·	1.1 km	MPC · JPL
213562	2002 LH_{32}	—	June 9, 2002	Palomar	NEAT	·	1.5 km	MPC · JPL
213563	2002 LM_{39}	—	June 10, 2002	Socorro	LINEAR	·	1.4 km	MPC · JPL
213564	2002 LO_{40}	—	June 10, 2002	Socorro	LINEAR	·	1.6 km	MPC · JPL
213565	2002 LN_{49}	—	June 7, 2002	Kitt Peak	Spacewatch	V	1.1 km	MPC · JPL
213566	2002 LX_{51}	—	June 9, 2002	Socorro	LINEAR	·	1.6 km	MPC · JPL
213567	2002 LR_{52}	—	June 7, 2002	Palomar	NEAT	·	1.4 km	MPC · JPL
213568	2002 LX_{55}	—	June 14, 2002	Socorro	LINEAR	·	2.5 km	MPC · JPL
213569	2002 MD_{5}	—	June 16, 2002	Palomar	NEAT	NYS	1.5 km	MPC · JPL
213570	2002 NF_{2}	—	July 4, 2002	Palomar	NEAT	·	1.6 km	MPC · JPL
213571	2002 NR_{5}	—	July 10, 2002	Campo Imperatore	CINEOS	·	1.2 km	MPC · JPL
213572	2002 NC_{9}	—	July 1, 2002	Palomar	NEAT	·	1.6 km	MPC · JPL
213573	2002 NC_{16}	—	July 5, 2002	Socorro	LINEAR	·	1.7 km	MPC · JPL
213574	2002 ND_{19}	—	July 9, 2002	Socorro	LINEAR	·	1.7 km	MPC · JPL
213575	2002 ND_{21}	—	July 9, 2002	Socorro	LINEAR	·	1.7 km	MPC · JPL
213576	2002 NC_{25}	—	July 9, 2002	Socorro	LINEAR	·	2.3 km	MPC · JPL
213577	2002 NV_{31}	—	July 10, 2002	Palomar	NEAT	·	1.5 km	MPC · JPL
213578	2002 NR_{32}	—	July 13, 2002	Socorro	LINEAR	·	3.7 km	MPC · JPL
213579	2002 NG_{35}	—	July 9, 2002	Socorro	LINEAR	·	1.8 km	MPC · JPL
213580	2002 NM_{40}	—	July 14, 2002	Palomar	NEAT	·	1.9 km	MPC · JPL
213581	2002 NK_{46}	—	July 13, 2002	Palomar	NEAT	·	1.7 km	MPC · JPL
213582	2002 NY_{53}	—	July 5, 2002	Socorro	LINEAR	NYS	1.5 km	MPC · JPL
213583	2002 NM_{55}	—	July 9, 2002	Socorro	LINEAR	·	1.5 km	MPC · JPL
213584	2002 NN_{56}	—	July 9, 2002	Socorro	LINEAR	·	1.2 km	MPC · JPL
213585	2002 NS_{60}	—	July 12, 2002	Palomar	NEAT	·	1.8 km	MPC · JPL
213586	2002 NX_{60}	—	July 15, 2002	Palomar	NEAT	NYS	1.5 km	MPC · JPL
213587	2002 NV_{64}	—	July 2, 2002	Palomar	NEAT	NYS	1.1 km	MPC · JPL
213588	2002 OH_{5}	—	July 17, 2002	Palomar	NEAT	·	1.4 km	MPC · JPL
213589	2002 OP_{9}	—	July 21, 2002	Palomar	NEAT	·	2.0 km	MPC · JPL
213590	2002 OU_{17}	—	July 18, 2002	Socorro	LINEAR	·	3.0 km	MPC · JPL
213591	2002 OH_{23}	—	July 30, 2002	Haleakala	NEAT	MAR	1.7 km	MPC · JPL
213592	2002 OP_{23}	—	July 22, 2002	Palomar	NEAT	·	2.1 km	MPC · JPL
213593	2002 PN_{11}	—	August 5, 2002	Campo Imperatore	CINEOS	·	2.3 km	MPC · JPL
213594	2002 PA_{20}	—	August 6, 2002	Palomar	NEAT	·	2.4 km	MPC · JPL
213595	2002 PZ_{29}	—	August 6, 2002	Palomar	NEAT	·	1.6 km	MPC · JPL
213596	2002 PN_{36}	—	August 6, 2002	Palomar	NEAT	NYS	1.6 km	MPC · JPL
213597	2002 PA_{41}	—	August 4, 2002	Socorro	LINEAR	·	3.3 km	MPC · JPL
213598	2002 PP_{47}	—	August 10, 2002	Socorro	LINEAR	V	1.1 km	MPC · JPL
213599	2002 PX_{52}	—	August 8, 2002	Palomar	NEAT	(5)	1.9 km	MPC · JPL
213600	2002 PV_{53}	—	August 8, 2002	Palomar	NEAT	(5)	2.0 km	MPC · JPL

== 213601–213700 ==
back to top

Designation			Discovery			Properties		Ref
Permanent	Provisional	Named after	Date	Site	Discoverer(s)	Category	Diam.	Ref
213601	2002 PZ_{55}	—	August 9, 2002	Socorro	LINEAR	·	1.7 km	MPC · JPL
213602	2002 PZ_{62}	—	August 8, 2002	Palomar	NEAT	·	2.2 km	MPC · JPL
213603	2002 PM_{74}	—	August 12, 2002	Socorro	LINEAR	·	2.2 km	MPC · JPL
213604	2002 PU_{86}	—	August 13, 2002	Reedy Creek	J. Broughton	ERI	2.5 km	MPC · JPL
213605	2002 PU_{94}	—	August 12, 2002	Haleakala	NEAT	·	2.0 km	MPC · JPL
213606	2002 PA_{102}	—	August 12, 2002	Socorro	LINEAR	·	3.7 km	MPC · JPL
213607	2002 PL_{103}	—	August 12, 2002	Socorro	LINEAR	ADE	4.5 km	MPC · JPL
213608	2002 PB_{120}	—	August 13, 2002	Anderson Mesa	LONEOS	·	1.8 km	MPC · JPL
213609	2002 PL_{121}	—	August 13, 2002	Anderson Mesa	LONEOS	MAR	1.4 km	MPC · JPL
213610	2002 PR_{121}	—	August 13, 2002	Anderson Mesa	LONEOS	·	1.1 km	MPC · JPL
213611	2002 PX_{156}	—	August 8, 2002	Palomar	S. F. Hönig	MAS	830 m	MPC · JPL
213612	2002 PF_{169}	—	August 8, 2002	Palomar	NEAT	·	1.3 km	MPC · JPL
213613	2002 PS_{169}	—	August 8, 2002	Palomar	NEAT	·	2.2 km	MPC · JPL
213614	2002 PP_{178}	—	August 7, 2002	Palomar	NEAT	·	2.0 km	MPC · JPL
213615	2002 PX_{182}	—	August 13, 2002	Palomar	NEAT	V	1.1 km	MPC · JPL
213616	2002 PW_{187}	—	August 8, 2002	Palomar	NEAT	·	1.7 km	MPC · JPL
213617	2002 QU_{14}	—	August 26, 2002	Palomar	NEAT	·	1.6 km	MPC · JPL
213618	2002 QK_{23}	—	August 27, 2002	Palomar	NEAT	·	1.7 km	MPC · JPL
213619	2002 QZ_{26}	—	August 27, 2002	Palomar	NEAT	·	1.7 km	MPC · JPL
213620	2002 QX_{27}	—	August 28, 2002	Palomar	NEAT	·	1.8 km	MPC · JPL
213621	2002 QH_{49}	—	August 19, 2002	Palomar	S. F. Hönig	·	2.8 km	MPC · JPL
213622	2002 QZ_{54}	—	August 29, 2002	Palomar	S. F. Hönig	·	1.7 km	MPC · JPL
213623	2002 QE_{55}	—	August 17, 2002	Palomar	Lowe, A.	·	1.2 km	MPC · JPL
213624	2002 QW_{55}	—	August 28, 2002	Palomar	Lowe, A.	MAS	900 m	MPC · JPL
213625	2002 QH_{56}	—	August 29, 2002	Palomar	S. F. Hönig	·	1.4 km	MPC · JPL
213626	2002 QX_{58}	—	August 16, 2002	Palomar	NEAT	·	1.3 km	MPC · JPL
213627	2002 QZ_{61}	—	August 28, 2002	Palomar	NEAT	·	1.3 km	MPC · JPL
213628	2002 QQ_{65}	—	August 28, 2002	Palomar	NEAT	·	2.0 km	MPC · JPL
213629 Binford	2002 QK_{67}	Binford	August 26, 2002	Palomar	NEAT	·	1.1 km	MPC · JPL
213630	2002 QR_{73}	—	August 30, 2002	Palomar	NEAT	·	1.5 km	MPC · JPL
213631	2002 QQ_{78}	—	August 29, 2002	Palomar	NEAT	·	1.5 km	MPC · JPL
213632	2002 QS_{100}	—	August 19, 2002	Palomar	NEAT	·	4.2 km	MPC · JPL
213633	2002 QX_{108}	—	August 27, 2002	Palomar	NEAT	·	1.7 km	MPC · JPL
213634	2002 QO_{115}	—	August 29, 2002	Palomar	NEAT	MAS	920 m	MPC · JPL
213635	2002 QZ_{120}	—	August 30, 2002	Palomar	NEAT	NYS	1.6 km	MPC · JPL
213636 Gajdoš	2002 QR_{122}	Gajdoš	August 20, 2002	Palomar	NEAT	·	2.2 km	MPC · JPL
213637 Lemarchal	2002 QM_{125}	Lemarchal	August 17, 2002	Palomar	NEAT	(5)	1.7 km	MPC · JPL
213638	2002 RU_{22}	—	September 4, 2002	Anderson Mesa	LONEOS	·	1.4 km	MPC · JPL
213639	2002 RF_{38}	—	September 5, 2002	Socorro	LINEAR	·	1.7 km	MPC · JPL
213640	2002 RA_{62}	—	September 5, 2002	Socorro	LINEAR	·	2.1 km	MPC · JPL
213641	2002 RP_{67}	—	September 3, 2002	Palomar	NEAT	EOS	3.2 km	MPC · JPL
213642	2002 RH_{83}	—	September 5, 2002	Socorro	LINEAR	·	1.7 km	MPC · JPL
213643	2002 RR_{90}	—	September 5, 2002	Socorro	LINEAR	·	2.6 km	MPC · JPL
213644	2002 RW_{103}	—	September 5, 2002	Socorro	LINEAR	·	1.8 km	MPC · JPL
213645	2002 RE_{104}	—	September 5, 2002	Socorro	LINEAR	(5)	1.7 km	MPC · JPL
213646	2002 RK_{109}	—	September 6, 2002	Socorro	LINEAR	·	2.0 km	MPC · JPL
213647	2002 RY_{116}	—	September 7, 2002	Kleť	Kleť	ADE	3.4 km	MPC · JPL
213648	2002 RU_{126}	—	September 9, 2002	Palomar	NEAT	·	1.5 km	MPC · JPL
213649	2002 RX_{133}	—	September 10, 2002	Palomar	NEAT	HNS	2.1 km	MPC · JPL
213650	2002 RF_{135}	—	September 10, 2002	Haleakala	NEAT	·	2.2 km	MPC · JPL
213651	2002 RA_{183}	—	September 11, 2002	Palomar	NEAT	·	2.9 km	MPC · JPL
213652	2002 RK_{184}	—	September 12, 2002	Palomar	NEAT	·	3.7 km	MPC · JPL
213653	2002 RJ_{197}	—	September 13, 2002	Palomar	NEAT	·	1.3 km	MPC · JPL
213654	2002 RL_{209}	—	September 14, 2002	Palomar	NEAT	GEF	1.4 km	MPC · JPL
213655	2002 RT_{215}	—	September 13, 2002	Socorro	LINEAR	·	1.5 km	MPC · JPL
213656	2002 RA_{235}	—	September 14, 2002	Palomar	R. Matson	NYS	1.3 km	MPC · JPL
213657	2002 RK_{243}	—	September 12, 2002	Palomar	NEAT	·	1.5 km	MPC · JPL
213658	2002 RR_{243}	—	September 14, 2002	Palomar	NEAT	·	1.8 km	MPC · JPL
213659	2002 RL_{250}	—	September 13, 2002	Haleakala	NEAT	·	1.8 km	MPC · JPL
213660	2002 SN_{4}	—	September 27, 2002	Palomar	NEAT	·	2.9 km	MPC · JPL
213661	2002 SL_{8}	—	September 27, 2002	Palomar	NEAT	H	670 m	MPC · JPL
213662	2002 SG_{11}	—	September 27, 2002	Palomar	NEAT	MAR	1.5 km	MPC · JPL
213663	2002 SO_{46}	—	September 29, 2002	Haleakala	NEAT	·	3.4 km	MPC · JPL
213664	2002 SS_{49}	—	September 30, 2002	Socorro	LINEAR	·	1.6 km	MPC · JPL
213665	2002 SS_{50}	—	September 30, 2002	Haleakala	NEAT	DOR	3.3 km	MPC · JPL
213666	2002 SD_{60}	—	September 16, 2002	Palomar	NEAT	·	5.8 km	MPC · JPL
213667	2002 TF_{9}	—	October 1, 2002	Anderson Mesa	LONEOS	·	2.0 km	MPC · JPL
213668	2002 TP_{23}	—	October 2, 2002	Socorro	LINEAR	·	2.0 km	MPC · JPL
213669	2002 TD_{38}	—	October 2, 2002	Socorro	LINEAR	HNS	2.1 km	MPC · JPL
213670	2002 TQ_{38}	—	October 2, 2002	Socorro	LINEAR	·	2.1 km	MPC · JPL
213671	2002 TK_{41}	—	October 2, 2002	Socorro	LINEAR	H	930 m	MPC · JPL
213672	2002 TZ_{41}	—	October 2, 2002	Socorro	LINEAR	·	2.1 km	MPC · JPL
213673	2002 TT_{54}	—	October 2, 2002	Socorro	LINEAR	·	3.4 km	MPC · JPL
213674	2002 TQ_{58}	—	October 2, 2002	Needville	J. Dellinger	·	2.9 km	MPC · JPL
213675	2002 TK_{60}	—	October 5, 2002	Socorro	LINEAR	H	770 m	MPC · JPL
213676	2002 TC_{66}	—	October 4, 2002	Campo Imperatore	CINEOS	·	2.1 km	MPC · JPL
213677	2002 TX_{66}	—	October 6, 2002	Palomar	NEAT	H	860 m	MPC · JPL
213678	2002 TD_{81}	—	October 1, 2002	Socorro	LINEAR	MRX	1.7 km	MPC · JPL
213679	2002 TP_{94}	—	October 3, 2002	Socorro	LINEAR	·	2.8 km	MPC · JPL
213680	2002 TD_{107}	—	October 3, 2002	Socorro	LINEAR	·	2.1 km	MPC · JPL
213681	2002 TF_{109}	—	October 2, 2002	Socorro	LINEAR	HOF	4.0 km	MPC · JPL
213682	2002 TX_{111}	—	October 3, 2002	Socorro	LINEAR	·	1.7 km	MPC · JPL
213683	2002 TA_{113}	—	October 3, 2002	Socorro	LINEAR	·	3.1 km	MPC · JPL
213684	2002 TH_{142}	—	October 3, 2002	Socorro	LINEAR	·	1.3 km	MPC · JPL
213685	2002 TM_{180}	—	October 14, 2002	Socorro	LINEAR	H	790 m	MPC · JPL
213686	2002 TX_{209}	—	October 6, 2002	Haleakala	NEAT	·	3.1 km	MPC · JPL
213687	2002 TL_{210}	—	October 7, 2002	Socorro	LINEAR	·	1.4 km	MPC · JPL
213688	2002 TU_{221}	—	October 7, 2002	Socorro	LINEAR	H	1.1 km	MPC · JPL
213689	2002 TG_{226}	—	October 8, 2002	Anderson Mesa	LONEOS	(194)	2.4 km	MPC · JPL
213690	2002 TH_{229}	—	October 7, 2002	Haleakala	NEAT	·	4.2 km	MPC · JPL
213691	2002 TA_{231}	—	October 8, 2002	Palomar	NEAT	·	1.5 km	MPC · JPL
213692	2002 TP_{245}	—	October 9, 2002	Anderson Mesa	LONEOS	(5)	1.5 km	MPC · JPL
213693	2002 TS_{248}	—	October 7, 2002	Socorro	LINEAR	AST	2.5 km	MPC · JPL
213694	2002 TW_{256}	—	October 9, 2002	Socorro	LINEAR	·	2.7 km	MPC · JPL
213695	2002 TY_{256}	—	October 9, 2002	Socorro	LINEAR	·	3.0 km	MPC · JPL
213696	2002 TJ_{267}	—	October 10, 2002	Socorro	LINEAR	·	6.1 km	MPC · JPL
213697	2002 TM_{270}	—	October 9, 2002	Socorro	LINEAR	·	3.8 km	MPC · JPL
213698	2002 TA_{275}	—	October 9, 2002	Socorro	LINEAR	·	3.6 km	MPC · JPL
213699	2002 TU_{277}	—	October 10, 2002	Socorro	LINEAR	·	6.6 km	MPC · JPL
213700	2002 TB_{288}	—	October 10, 2002	Socorro	LINEAR	H	1.1 km	MPC · JPL

== 213701–213800 ==
back to top

Designation			Discovery			Properties		Ref
Permanent	Provisional	Named after	Date	Site	Discoverer(s)	Category	Diam.	Ref
213701	2002 TV_{288}	—	October 10, 2002	Socorro	LINEAR	·	2.2 km	MPC · JPL
213702	2002 TL_{297}	—	October 11, 2002	Socorro	LINEAR	·	3.4 km	MPC · JPL
213703	2002 TQ_{357}	—	October 10, 2002	Apache Point	SDSS	·	1.8 km	MPC · JPL
213704	2002 TJ_{368}	—	October 10, 2002	Apache Point	SDSS	·	1.4 km	MPC · JPL
213705	2002 TQ_{377}	—	October 4, 2002	Palomar	NEAT	·	1.5 km	MPC · JPL
213706	2002 UZ	—	October 25, 2002	Palomar	NEAT	slow	2.1 km	MPC · JPL
213707	2002 UF_{17}	—	October 28, 2002	Haleakala	NEAT	·	1.6 km	MPC · JPL
213708	2002 UZ_{25}	—	October 30, 2002	Kitt Peak	Spacewatch	·	2.8 km	MPC · JPL
213709	2002 UP_{35}	—	October 31, 2002	Palomar	NEAT	RAF	1.3 km	MPC · JPL
213710	2002 UK_{38}	—	October 31, 2002	Anderson Mesa	LONEOS	DOR	3.4 km	MPC · JPL
213711	2002 UQ_{38}	—	October 31, 2002	Palomar	NEAT	KON	3.1 km	MPC · JPL
213712	2002 UM_{64}	—	October 30, 2002	Apache Point	SDSS	·	1.6 km	MPC · JPL
213713	2002 US_{67}	—	October 30, 2002	Apache Point	SDSS	·	1.8 km	MPC · JPL
213714	2002 VP_{9}	—	November 1, 2002	Palomar	NEAT	·	2.6 km	MPC · JPL
213715	2002 VY_{13}	—	November 5, 2002	Socorro	LINEAR	H	990 m	MPC · JPL
213716	2002 VG_{15}	—	November 6, 2002	Socorro	LINEAR	H	750 m	MPC · JPL
213717	2002 VO_{19}	—	November 4, 2002	Palomar	NEAT	·	4.2 km	MPC · JPL
213718	2002 VW_{38}	—	November 5, 2002	Socorro	LINEAR	·	2.9 km	MPC · JPL
213719	2002 VK_{46}	—	November 5, 2002	Palomar	NEAT	·	2.0 km	MPC · JPL
213720	2002 VP_{48}	—	November 5, 2002	Socorro	LINEAR	·	1.8 km	MPC · JPL
213721	2002 VX_{51}	—	November 6, 2002	Anderson Mesa	LONEOS	·	2.8 km	MPC · JPL
213722	2002 VR_{52}	—	November 6, 2002	Socorro	LINEAR	·	2.8 km	MPC · JPL
213723	2002 VC_{56}	—	November 6, 2002	Anderson Mesa	LONEOS	·	4.2 km	MPC · JPL
213724	2002 VU_{63}	—	November 6, 2002	Anderson Mesa	LONEOS	·	3.9 km	MPC · JPL
213725	2002 VV_{74}	—	November 7, 2002	Socorro	LINEAR	HOF	3.5 km	MPC · JPL
213726	2002 VJ_{80}	—	November 7, 2002	Socorro	LINEAR	GEF	1.6 km	MPC · JPL
213727	2002 VF_{92}	—	November 13, 2002	Wrightwood	J. W. Young	AGN	1.5 km	MPC · JPL
213728	2002 VV_{92}	—	November 11, 2002	Socorro	LINEAR	·	1.8 km	MPC · JPL
213729	2002 VQ_{117}	—	November 12, 2002	Socorro	LINEAR	H	830 m	MPC · JPL
213730	2002 VT_{123}	—	November 14, 2002	Socorro	LINEAR	AGN	1.5 km	MPC · JPL
213731	2002 VM_{124}	—	November 11, 2002	Socorro	LINEAR	·	3.0 km	MPC · JPL
213732	2002 VS_{125}	—	November 14, 2002	Socorro	LINEAR	·	6.0 km	MPC · JPL
213733	2002 VB_{136}	—	November 7, 2002	Kitt Peak	Spacewatch	·	2.3 km	MPC · JPL
213734	2002 VC_{136}	—	November 8, 2002	Socorro	LINEAR	·	4.5 km	MPC · JPL
213735	2002 VL_{142}	—	November 5, 2002	Palomar	NEAT	·	2.2 km	MPC · JPL
213736	2002 VQ_{145}	—	November 4, 2002	Palomar	NEAT	AST	2.0 km	MPC · JPL
213737	2002 WA_{2}	—	November 23, 2002	Palomar	NEAT	·	1.7 km	MPC · JPL
213738	2002 WA_{4}	—	November 24, 2002	Palomar	NEAT	·	2.2 km	MPC · JPL
213739	2002 WR_{6}	—	November 24, 2002	Palomar	NEAT	(16286)	3.3 km	MPC · JPL
213740	2002 WY_{21}	—	November 16, 2002	Palomar	NEAT	·	2.2 km	MPC · JPL
213741	2002 WR_{28}	—	November 22, 2002	Palomar	NEAT	·	2.7 km	MPC · JPL
213742	2002 WC_{29}	—	November 24, 2002	Palomar	NEAT	HOF	5.4 km	MPC · JPL
213743	2002 XL_{3}	—	December 1, 2002	Socorro	LINEAR	·	2.6 km	MPC · JPL
213744	2002 XT_{10}	—	December 3, 2002	Palomar	NEAT	·	3.3 km	MPC · JPL
213745	2002 XD_{46}	—	December 10, 2002	Socorro	LINEAR	H	900 m	MPC · JPL
213746	2002 XX_{47}	—	December 10, 2002	Socorro	LINEAR	·	2.4 km	MPC · JPL
213747	2002 XR_{48}	—	December 10, 2002	Socorro	LINEAR	·	3.0 km	MPC · JPL
213748	2002 XE_{50}	—	December 10, 2002	Palomar	NEAT	·	2.2 km	MPC · JPL
213749	2002 XB_{62}	—	December 11, 2002	Socorro	LINEAR	·	5.7 km	MPC · JPL
213750	2002 XE_{66}	—	December 12, 2002	Socorro	LINEAR	T_{j} (2.98)	7.8 km	MPC · JPL
213751	2002 XS_{66}	—	December 11, 2002	Desert Eagle	W. K. Y. Yeung	·	1.9 km	MPC · JPL
213752	2002 XM_{79}	—	December 11, 2002	Socorro	LINEAR	·	3.1 km	MPC · JPL
213753	2002 XX_{115}	—	December 11, 2002	Apache Point	SDSS	·	3.9 km	MPC · JPL
213754	2002 YX_{18}	—	December 31, 2002	Socorro	LINEAR	·	3.4 km	MPC · JPL
213755	2003 AM_{2}	—	January 1, 2003	Socorro	LINEAR	H	1.0 km	MPC · JPL
213756	2003 AX_{23}	—	January 4, 2003	Socorro	LINEAR	·	3.6 km	MPC · JPL
213757	2003 AA_{50}	—	January 5, 2003	Socorro	LINEAR	·	6.7 km	MPC · JPL
213758	2003 AB_{51}	—	January 5, 2003	Socorro	LINEAR	·	2.7 km	MPC · JPL
213759	2003 AE_{60}	—	January 5, 2003	Socorro	LINEAR	JUN	2.8 km	MPC · JPL
213760	2003 AE_{65}	—	January 7, 2003	Socorro	LINEAR	·	3.1 km	MPC · JPL
213761	2003 AB_{66}	—	January 7, 2003	Socorro	LINEAR	·	4.7 km	MPC · JPL
213762	2003 AW_{66}	—	January 7, 2003	Socorro	LINEAR	·	4.1 km	MPC · JPL
213763	2003 AX_{79}	—	January 11, 2003	Socorro	LINEAR	·	6.8 km	MPC · JPL
213764	2003 AQ_{80}	—	January 11, 2003	Socorro	LINEAR	·	5.0 km	MPC · JPL
213765	2003 BD_{25}	—	January 25, 2003	Palomar	NEAT	·	6.6 km	MPC · JPL
213766	2003 BS_{53}	—	January 27, 2003	Anderson Mesa	LONEOS	·	4.7 km	MPC · JPL
213767	2003 CF_{19}	—	February 8, 2003	Socorro	LINEAR	·	4.0 km	MPC · JPL
213768	2003 CK_{20}	—	February 9, 2003	Palomar	NEAT	·	3.4 km	MPC · JPL
213769	2003 CJ_{25}	—	February 11, 2003	Haleakala	NEAT	·	4.4 km	MPC · JPL
213770 Fignon	2003 DK_{6}	Fignon	February 23, 2003	Vicques	M. Ory	·	2.3 km	MPC · JPL
213771 Johndee	2003 DE_{13}	Johndee	February 27, 2003	Kleť	KLENOT	THM	3.0 km	MPC · JPL
213772 Blaheta	2003 DF_{13}	Blaheta	February 27, 2003	Kleť	KLENOT	HYG	4.2 km	MPC · JPL
213773	2003 DL_{13}	—	February 22, 2003	Goodricke-Pigott	Kessel, J. W.	·	5.3 km	MPC · JPL
213774	2003 DK_{15}	—	February 26, 2003	Socorro	LINEAR	·	6.7 km	MPC · JPL
213775 Zdeněkdostál	2003 DK_{17}	Zdeněkdostál	February 28, 2003	Kleť	KLENOT	(8737)	4.3 km	MPC · JPL
213776	2003 DZ_{18}	—	February 21, 2003	Palomar	NEAT	·	5.1 km	MPC · JPL
213777	2003 EN_{10}	—	March 6, 2003	Socorro	LINEAR	·	6.4 km	MPC · JPL
213778	2003 EE_{12}	—	March 6, 2003	Anderson Mesa	LONEOS	·	4.4 km	MPC · JPL
213779	2003 EP_{14}	—	March 6, 2003	Anderson Mesa	LONEOS	·	3.6 km	MPC · JPL
213780	2003 EW_{37}	—	March 8, 2003	Anderson Mesa	LONEOS	·	5.2 km	MPC · JPL
213781	2003 EB_{52}	—	March 11, 2003	Palomar	NEAT	TIR	4.8 km	MPC · JPL
213782	2003 EV_{59}	—	March 13, 2003	Socorro	LINEAR	·	5.3 km	MPC · JPL
213783	2003 FF	—	March 22, 2003	Desert Moon	Stevens, B. L.	·	3.2 km	MPC · JPL
213784	2003 FY_{4}	—	March 25, 2003	Kleť	M. Tichý	·	5.3 km	MPC · JPL
213785	2003 FZ_{4}	—	March 25, 2003	Emerald Lane	L. Ball	·	4.8 km	MPC · JPL
213786	2003 FJ_{5}	—	March 26, 2003	Campo Imperatore	CINEOS	·	5.6 km	MPC · JPL
213787	2003 FC_{11}	—	March 23, 2003	Kitt Peak	Spacewatch	·	5.9 km	MPC · JPL
213788	2003 FF_{11}	—	March 23, 2003	Kitt Peak	Spacewatch	·	2.5 km	MPC · JPL
213789	2003 FF_{27}	—	March 24, 2003	Kitt Peak	Spacewatch	·	4.0 km	MPC · JPL
213790	2003 FG_{31}	—	March 23, 2003	Kitt Peak	Spacewatch	·	4.7 km	MPC · JPL
213791	2003 FP_{31}	—	March 23, 2003	Kitt Peak	Spacewatch	HYG	3.3 km	MPC · JPL
213792	2003 FJ_{42}	—	March 30, 2003	Socorro	LINEAR	·	9.0 km	MPC · JPL
213793	2003 FT_{43}	—	March 23, 2003	Kitt Peak	Spacewatch	·	6.4 km	MPC · JPL
213794	2003 FT_{51}	—	March 25, 2003	Catalina	CSS	·	4.9 km	MPC · JPL
213795	2003 FA_{58}	—	March 26, 2003	Kitt Peak	Spacewatch	·	5.4 km	MPC · JPL
213796	2003 FH_{90}	—	March 29, 2003	Anderson Mesa	LONEOS	LIX	5.4 km	MPC · JPL
213797	2003 FN_{95}	—	March 30, 2003	Anderson Mesa	LONEOS	EOS	3.5 km	MPC · JPL
213798	2003 FK_{100}	—	March 31, 2003	Anderson Mesa	LONEOS	·	5.7 km	MPC · JPL
213799	2003 FK_{116}	—	March 23, 2003	Kitt Peak	Spacewatch	·	3.8 km	MPC · JPL
213800 Stefanwul	2003 GO	Stefan Wul	April 2, 2003	Saint-Sulpice	B. Christophe	·	4.5 km	MPC · JPL

== 213801–213900 ==
back to top

Designation			Discovery			Properties		Ref
Permanent	Provisional	Named after	Date	Site	Discoverer(s)	Category	Diam.	Ref
213801	2003 GZ_{7}	—	April 3, 2003	Anderson Mesa	LONEOS	·	5.9 km	MPC · JPL
213802	2003 GP_{14}	—	April 2, 2003	Haleakala	NEAT	·	5.6 km	MPC · JPL
213803	2003 GC_{17}	—	April 5, 2003	Haleakala	NEAT	·	6.2 km	MPC · JPL
213804	2003 GE_{17}	—	April 5, 2003	Haleakala	NEAT	T_{j} (2.98)	7.8 km	MPC · JPL
213805	2003 GP_{22}	—	April 5, 2003	Anderson Mesa	LONEOS	·	7.4 km	MPC · JPL
213806	2003 GT_{35}	—	April 5, 2003	Anderson Mesa	LONEOS	·	3.8 km	MPC · JPL
213807	2003 GY_{41}	—	April 7, 2003	Palomar	NEAT	·	4.4 km	MPC · JPL
213808	2003 HO_{10}	—	April 25, 2003	Kitt Peak	Spacewatch	·	950 m	MPC · JPL
213809	2003 HA_{15}	—	April 26, 2003	Haleakala	NEAT	·	5.0 km	MPC · JPL
213810	2003 HG_{42}	—	April 27, 2003	Anderson Mesa	LONEOS	·	5.2 km	MPC · JPL
213811	2003 MA_{4}	—	June 26, 2003	Socorro	LINEAR	(2076)	1.9 km	MPC · JPL
213812	2003 NE	—	July 1, 2003	Haleakala	NEAT	·	1.1 km	MPC · JPL
213813	2003 PW_{12}	—	August 4, 2003	Socorro	LINEAR	NYS	1.5 km	MPC · JPL
213814	2003 QY_{18}	—	August 22, 2003	Socorro	LINEAR	NYS	1.4 km	MPC · JPL
213815	2003 QB_{20}	—	August 22, 2003	Palomar	NEAT	·	1.5 km	MPC · JPL
213816	2003 QQ_{21}	—	August 22, 2003	Palomar	NEAT	·	1.5 km	MPC · JPL
213817	2003 QF_{24}	—	August 21, 2003	Palomar	NEAT	·	1.1 km	MPC · JPL
213818	2003 QV_{26}	—	August 22, 2003	Haleakala	NEAT	(2076)	1.4 km	MPC · JPL
213819	2003 QG_{32}	—	August 21, 2003	Palomar	NEAT	V	930 m	MPC · JPL
213820	2003 QG_{49}	—	August 22, 2003	Palomar	NEAT	·	1.1 km	MPC · JPL
213821	2003 QO_{52}	—	August 23, 2003	Socorro	LINEAR	·	1.1 km	MPC · JPL
213822	2003 QZ_{55}	—	August 23, 2003	Socorro	LINEAR	·	1.7 km	MPC · JPL
213823	2003 QT_{62}	—	August 23, 2003	Socorro	LINEAR	·	1.3 km	MPC · JPL
213824	2003 QD_{63}	—	August 23, 2003	Socorro	LINEAR	·	1.4 km	MPC · JPL
213825	2003 QW_{63}	—	August 23, 2003	Socorro	LINEAR	ERI	3.4 km	MPC · JPL
213826	2003 QK_{65}	—	August 24, 2003	Palomar	NEAT	EOS	3.4 km	MPC · JPL
213827	2003 QN_{75}	—	August 24, 2003	Socorro	LINEAR	·	1.4 km	MPC · JPL
213828	2003 QU_{75}	—	August 24, 2003	Socorro	LINEAR	·	1.3 km	MPC · JPL
213829	2003 QN_{76}	—	August 24, 2003	Socorro	LINEAR	·	1.2 km	MPC · JPL
213830	2003 QY_{84}	—	August 24, 2003	Socorro	LINEAR	·	1.8 km	MPC · JPL
213831	2003 QG_{92}	—	August 30, 2003	Consell	R. Pacheco	V	880 m	MPC · JPL
213832	2003 QM_{94}	—	August 28, 2003	Haleakala	NEAT	·	1.2 km	MPC · JPL
213833	2003 QN_{101}	—	August 29, 2003	Socorro	LINEAR	·	1.4 km	MPC · JPL
213834	2003 QD_{103}	—	August 31, 2003	Kitt Peak	Spacewatch	KOR	2.1 km	MPC · JPL
213835	2003 QZ_{110}	—	August 31, 2003	Socorro	LINEAR	slow	880 m	MPC · JPL
213836	2003 RQ_{12}	—	September 14, 2003	Haleakala	NEAT	NYS	1.6 km	MPC · JPL
213837	2003 RR_{15}	—	September 14, 2003	Palomar	NEAT	PHO	2.1 km	MPC · JPL
213838	2003 RF_{27}	—	September 4, 2003	Kvistaberg	Uppsala-DLR Asteroid Survey	·	960 m	MPC · JPL
213839	2003 SM_{3}	—	September 16, 2003	Palomar	NEAT	·	1.2 km	MPC · JPL
213840	2003 SU_{5}	—	September 16, 2003	Kitt Peak	Spacewatch	·	1.6 km	MPC · JPL
213841	2003 SV_{7}	—	September 16, 2003	Palomar	NEAT	·	1.3 km	MPC · JPL
213842	2003 SM_{8}	—	September 16, 2003	Kitt Peak	Spacewatch	·	1.3 km	MPC · JPL
213843	2003 SE_{13}	—	September 16, 2003	Kitt Peak	Spacewatch	MAS	980 m	MPC · JPL
213844	2003 SU_{27}	—	September 18, 2003	Palomar	NEAT	·	1.4 km	MPC · JPL
213845	2003 SC_{50}	—	September 18, 2003	Palomar	NEAT	·	1.7 km	MPC · JPL
213846	2003 SA_{52}	—	September 18, 2003	Palomar	NEAT	·	1.6 km	MPC · JPL
213847	2003 SP_{52}	—	September 18, 2003	Palomar	NEAT	V	1.2 km	MPC · JPL
213848	2003 ST_{54}	—	September 16, 2003	Anderson Mesa	LONEOS	V	1.1 km	MPC · JPL
213849	2003 SF_{55}	—	September 16, 2003	Anderson Mesa	LONEOS	·	2.1 km	MPC · JPL
213850	2003 SZ_{55}	—	September 16, 2003	Anderson Mesa	LONEOS	·	1.1 km	MPC · JPL
213851	2003 SE_{61}	—	September 17, 2003	Socorro	LINEAR	V	1.1 km	MPC · JPL
213852	2003 SY_{70}	—	September 18, 2003	Kitt Peak	Spacewatch	·	3.5 km	MPC · JPL
213853	2003 SG_{81}	—	September 19, 2003	Kitt Peak	Spacewatch	·	1.3 km	MPC · JPL
213854	2003 SK_{88}	—	September 18, 2003	Campo Imperatore	CINEOS	·	1.1 km	MPC · JPL
213855	2003 SK_{103}	—	September 20, 2003	Socorro	LINEAR	·	4.2 km	MPC · JPL
213856	2003 SA_{104}	—	September 20, 2003	Socorro	LINEAR	·	1.8 km	MPC · JPL
213857	2003 SH_{116}	—	September 16, 2003	Socorro	LINEAR	·	2.3 km	MPC · JPL
213858	2003 SZ_{120}	—	September 17, 2003	Socorro	LINEAR	·	1.8 km	MPC · JPL
213859	2003 SG_{127}	—	September 19, 2003	Črni Vrh	H. Mikuž, S. Matičič	·	2.1 km	MPC · JPL
213860	2003 SU_{131}	—	September 18, 2003	Kitt Peak	Spacewatch	·	1.5 km	MPC · JPL
213861	2003 SX_{133}	—	September 18, 2003	Socorro	LINEAR	MAS	1.1 km	MPC · JPL
213862	2003 SL_{147}	—	September 20, 2003	Haleakala	NEAT	·	1.8 km	MPC · JPL
213863	2003 SZ_{148}	—	September 16, 2003	Kitt Peak	Spacewatch	V	1.2 km	MPC · JPL
213864	2003 SQ_{150}	—	September 17, 2003	Socorro	LINEAR	V	1.2 km	MPC · JPL
213865	2003 SJ_{156}	—	September 19, 2003	Anderson Mesa	LONEOS	MAS	1.2 km	MPC · JPL
213866	2003 ST_{157}	—	September 19, 2003	Anderson Mesa	LONEOS	NYS	2.1 km	MPC · JPL
213867	2003 SA_{163}	—	September 19, 2003	Kitt Peak	Spacewatch	·	2.8 km	MPC · JPL
213868	2003 SQ_{165}	—	September 20, 2003	Anderson Mesa	LONEOS	·	2.3 km	MPC · JPL
213869	2003 SG_{170}	—	September 20, 2003	Campo Imperatore	CINEOS	APO +1km	970 m	MPC · JPL
213870	2003 SQ_{173}	—	September 18, 2003	Palomar	NEAT	·	1.7 km	MPC · JPL
213871	2003 SE_{179}	—	September 19, 2003	Palomar	NEAT	NYS	1.8 km	MPC · JPL
213872	2003 SX_{188}	—	September 22, 2003	Anderson Mesa	LONEOS	·	2.0 km	MPC · JPL
213873	2003 SN_{206}	—	September 25, 2003	Haleakala	NEAT	·	1.6 km	MPC · JPL
213874	2003 SO_{213}	—	September 26, 2003	Socorro	LINEAR	·	2.0 km	MPC · JPL
213875	2003 SA_{225}	—	September 25, 2003	Haleakala	NEAT	·	2.0 km	MPC · JPL
213876	2003 SO_{246}	—	September 26, 2003	Socorro	LINEAR	·	980 m	MPC · JPL
213877	2003 SH_{248}	—	September 26, 2003	Socorro	LINEAR	·	1.5 km	MPC · JPL
213878	2003 SB_{249}	—	September 26, 2003	Socorro	LINEAR	·	1.5 km	MPC · JPL
213879	2003 SC_{249}	—	September 26, 2003	Socorro	LINEAR	·	1.0 km	MPC · JPL
213880	2003 SM_{249}	—	September 26, 2003	Socorro	LINEAR	MAS	1.2 km	MPC · JPL
213881	2003 SO_{249}	—	September 26, 2003	Socorro	LINEAR	·	1.7 km	MPC · JPL
213882	2003 SQ_{250}	—	September 26, 2003	Socorro	LINEAR	·	2.2 km	MPC · JPL
213883	2003 SU_{263}	—	September 28, 2003	Socorro	LINEAR	·	1.9 km	MPC · JPL
213884	2003 SX_{269}	—	September 24, 2003	Haleakala	NEAT	·	860 m	MPC · JPL
213885	2003 SU_{270}	—	September 25, 2003	Palomar	NEAT	·	1.9 km	MPC · JPL
213886	2003 SM_{271}	—	September 25, 2003	Haleakala	NEAT	·	990 m	MPC · JPL
213887	2003 SV_{275}	—	September 29, 2003	Socorro	LINEAR	·	920 m	MPC · JPL
213888	2003 SS_{288}	—	September 28, 2003	Socorro	LINEAR	SUL	2.6 km	MPC · JPL
213889	2003 SW_{300}	—	September 17, 2003	Palomar	NEAT	V	1.0 km	MPC · JPL
213890	2003 SX_{303}	—	September 17, 2003	Palomar	NEAT	NYS	1.9 km	MPC · JPL
213891	2003 SZ_{309}	—	September 28, 2003	Socorro	LINEAR	·	3.1 km	MPC · JPL
213892	2003 SH_{334}	—	September 22, 2003	Kitt Peak	Spacewatch	·	1.6 km	MPC · JPL
213893	2003 TN_{2}	—	October 7, 2003	Wrightwood	J. W. Young	NYS	1.9 km	MPC · JPL
213894	2003 TP_{2}	—	October 8, 2003	Wrightwood	J. W. Young	·	1.8 km	MPC · JPL
213895	2003 TF_{6}	—	October 1, 2003	Anderson Mesa	LONEOS	·	1.2 km	MPC · JPL
213896	2003 TL_{55}	—	October 5, 2003	Kitt Peak	Spacewatch	V	640 m	MPC · JPL
213897	2003 UP_{1}	—	October 16, 2003	Kitt Peak	Spacewatch	·	1.3 km	MPC · JPL
213898	2003 UU_{16}	—	October 16, 2003	Haleakala	NEAT	NYS ·	3.3 km	MPC · JPL
213899	2003 US_{29}	—	October 21, 2003	Socorro	LINEAR	·	1.1 km	MPC · JPL
213900	2003 UN_{34}	—	October 17, 2003	Kitt Peak	Spacewatch	·	1.4 km	MPC · JPL

== 213901–214000 ==
back to top

Designation			Discovery			Properties		Ref
Permanent	Provisional	Named after	Date	Site	Discoverer(s)	Category	Diam.	Ref
213901	2003 UR_{48}	—	October 16, 2003	Anderson Mesa	LONEOS	·	1.9 km	MPC · JPL
213902	2003 UT_{48}	—	October 16, 2003	Anderson Mesa	LONEOS	·	1.4 km	MPC · JPL
213903	2003 UK_{49}	—	October 16, 2003	Palomar	NEAT	·	3.2 km	MPC · JPL
213904	2003 US_{61}	—	October 16, 2003	Anderson Mesa	LONEOS	V	940 m	MPC · JPL
213905	2003 UK_{62}	—	October 16, 2003	Anderson Mesa	LONEOS	·	1.3 km	MPC · JPL
213906	2003 UZ_{64}	—	October 16, 2003	Anderson Mesa	LONEOS	PHO · fast	1.5 km	MPC · JPL
213907	2003 US_{65}	—	October 16, 2003	Palomar	NEAT	V	980 m	MPC · JPL
213908	2003 UF_{88}	—	October 19, 2003	Kitt Peak	Spacewatch	·	1.3 km	MPC · JPL
213909	2003 UC_{96}	—	October 18, 2003	Kitt Peak	Spacewatch	·	970 m	MPC · JPL
213910	2003 UW_{98}	—	October 19, 2003	Anderson Mesa	LONEOS	V	1.1 km	MPC · JPL
213911	2003 UV_{101}	—	October 20, 2003	Socorro	LINEAR	·	1.5 km	MPC · JPL
213912	2003 UN_{103}	—	October 20, 2003	Palomar	NEAT	·	1.6 km	MPC · JPL
213913	2003 UM_{115}	—	October 20, 2003	Palomar	NEAT	·	2.1 km	MPC · JPL
213914	2003 UQ_{133}	—	October 20, 2003	Socorro	LINEAR	V	1.1 km	MPC · JPL
213915	2003 UX_{137}	—	October 21, 2003	Socorro	LINEAR	·	2.5 km	MPC · JPL
213916	2003 UW_{149}	—	October 20, 2003	Socorro	LINEAR	·	1.1 km	MPC · JPL
213917	2003 UD_{150}	—	October 20, 2003	Socorro	LINEAR	·	1.0 km	MPC · JPL
213918	2003 UK_{174}	—	October 21, 2003	Palomar	NEAT	·	1.2 km	MPC · JPL
213919	2003 UL_{178}	—	October 21, 2003	Socorro	LINEAR	V	1.2 km	MPC · JPL
213920	2003 UB_{185}	—	October 21, 2003	Palomar	NEAT	·	1.2 km	MPC · JPL
213921	2003 UN_{185}	—	October 21, 2003	Kitt Peak	Spacewatch	(5)	1.6 km	MPC · JPL
213922	2003 UT_{201}	—	October 21, 2003	Socorro	LINEAR	NYS	2.7 km	MPC · JPL
213923	2003 UB_{205}	—	October 22, 2003	Socorro	LINEAR	EOS	2.5 km	MPC · JPL
213924	2003 UD_{218}	—	October 21, 2003	Socorro	LINEAR	EMA	4.5 km	MPC · JPL
213925	2003 UW_{223}	—	October 22, 2003	Socorro	LINEAR	·	3.8 km	MPC · JPL
213926	2003 UG_{257}	—	October 25, 2003	Socorro	LINEAR	V	1.1 km	MPC · JPL
213927	2003 UW_{265}	—	October 27, 2003	Kitt Peak	Spacewatch	(5)	2.0 km	MPC · JPL
213928	2003 UY_{273}	—	October 29, 2003	Haleakala	NEAT	·	1.6 km	MPC · JPL
213929	2003 UM_{275}	—	October 29, 2003	Socorro	LINEAR	V	930 m	MPC · JPL
213930	2003 UK_{303}	—	October 17, 2003	Anderson Mesa	LONEOS	EOS	2.9 km	MPC · JPL
213931	2003 UN_{314}	—	October 21, 2003	Socorro	LINEAR	·	2.0 km	MPC · JPL
213932	2003 UA_{381}	—	October 22, 2003	Apache Point	SDSS	·	1.4 km	MPC · JPL
213933	2003 UY_{414}	—	October 23, 2003	Apache Point	SDSS	·	1.5 km	MPC · JPL
213934	2003 UN_{415}	—	October 19, 2003	Kitt Peak	Spacewatch	PHO	1.3 km	MPC · JPL
213935	2003 VZ_{5}	—	November 15, 2003	Kitt Peak	Spacewatch	·	1.7 km	MPC · JPL
213936	2003 VL_{7}	—	November 15, 2003	Kitt Peak	Spacewatch	·	1.4 km	MPC · JPL
213937	2003 WR_{20}	—	November 19, 2003	Socorro	LINEAR	·	1.6 km	MPC · JPL
213938	2003 WS_{55}	—	November 20, 2003	Socorro	LINEAR	·	1.6 km	MPC · JPL
213939	2003 WW_{64}	—	November 19, 2003	Kitt Peak	Spacewatch	·	1.9 km	MPC · JPL
213940	2003 WN_{72}	—	November 20, 2003	Socorro	LINEAR	(5)	1.4 km	MPC · JPL
213941	2003 WH_{73}	—	November 20, 2003	Socorro	LINEAR	·	1.5 km	MPC · JPL
213942	2003 WT_{73}	—	November 20, 2003	Socorro	LINEAR	·	3.3 km	MPC · JPL
213943	2003 WA_{77}	—	November 19, 2003	Socorro	LINEAR	·	3.4 km	MPC · JPL
213944	2003 WS_{80}	—	November 20, 2003	Catalina	CSS	·	2.9 km	MPC · JPL
213945	2003 WE_{92}	—	November 18, 2003	Palomar	NEAT	NYS	1.7 km	MPC · JPL
213946	2003 WU_{107}	—	November 23, 2003	Kitt Peak	Spacewatch	(5)	1.9 km	MPC · JPL
213947	2003 WV_{116}	—	November 20, 2003	Socorro	LINEAR	·	1.6 km	MPC · JPL
213948	2003 WL_{126}	—	November 20, 2003	Socorro	LINEAR	·	2.2 km	MPC · JPL
213949	2003 WJ_{127}	—	November 20, 2003	Socorro	LINEAR	·	2.3 km	MPC · JPL
213950	2003 WB_{136}	—	November 21, 2003	Socorro	LINEAR	·	1.5 km	MPC · JPL
213951	2003 WK_{167}	—	November 19, 2003	Palomar	NEAT	·	2.2 km	MPC · JPL
213952	2003 WT_{193}	—	November 19, 2003	Kitt Peak	Spacewatch	(5)	1.5 km	MPC · JPL
213953	2003 XJ_{16}	—	December 14, 2003	Palomar	NEAT	V	1.2 km	MPC · JPL
213954	2003 XD_{25}	—	December 1, 2003	Kitt Peak	Spacewatch	·	1.5 km	MPC · JPL
213955	2003 XE_{43}	—	December 15, 2003	Socorro	LINEAR	MAR	1.7 km	MPC · JPL
213956	2003 YY_{11}	—	December 17, 2003	Socorro	LINEAR	·	3.0 km	MPC · JPL
213957	2003 YS_{16}	—	December 17, 2003	Kitt Peak	Spacewatch	·	1.8 km	MPC · JPL
213958	2003 YF_{17}	—	December 17, 2003	Kitt Peak	Spacewatch	·	3.5 km	MPC · JPL
213959	2003 YL_{21}	—	December 17, 2003	Kitt Peak	Spacewatch	·	2.3 km	MPC · JPL
213960	2003 YX_{25}	—	December 18, 2003	Socorro	LINEAR	·	2.1 km	MPC · JPL
213961	2003 YA_{26}	—	December 18, 2003	Socorro	LINEAR	·	2.2 km	MPC · JPL
213962	2003 YQ_{28}	—	December 17, 2003	Kitt Peak	Spacewatch	·	1.9 km	MPC · JPL
213963	2003 YM_{33}	—	December 16, 2003	Anderson Mesa	LONEOS	·	3.4 km	MPC · JPL
213964	2003 YZ_{62}	—	December 19, 2003	Socorro	LINEAR	·	2.2 km	MPC · JPL
213965	2003 YA_{76}	—	December 18, 2003	Socorro	LINEAR	·	1.6 km	MPC · JPL
213966	2003 YY_{89}	—	December 19, 2003	Kitt Peak	Spacewatch	MRX	1.6 km	MPC · JPL
213967	2003 YD_{95}	—	December 19, 2003	Socorro	LINEAR	·	2.2 km	MPC · JPL
213968	2003 YS_{111}	—	December 23, 2003	Socorro	LINEAR	·	2.1 km	MPC · JPL
213969	2003 YM_{127}	—	December 27, 2003	Socorro	LINEAR	·	1.9 km	MPC · JPL
213970	2003 YS_{134}	—	December 28, 2003	Socorro	LINEAR	·	4.3 km	MPC · JPL
213971	2003 YG_{138}	—	December 27, 2003	Socorro	LINEAR	·	2.1 km	MPC · JPL
213972	2003 YK_{139}	—	December 28, 2003	Socorro	LINEAR	EUN	1.9 km	MPC · JPL
213973	2003 YU_{140}	—	December 28, 2003	Socorro	LINEAR	·	5.2 km	MPC · JPL
213974	2003 YV_{140}	—	December 28, 2003	Socorro	LINEAR	·	1.7 km	MPC · JPL
213975	2003 YV_{142}	—	December 28, 2003	Socorro	LINEAR	EUN	1.9 km	MPC · JPL
213976	2003 YS_{144}	—	December 28, 2003	Socorro	LINEAR	·	2.5 km	MPC · JPL
213977	2003 YL_{150}	—	December 29, 2003	Anderson Mesa	LONEOS	·	2.2 km	MPC · JPL
213978	2003 YN_{151}	—	December 29, 2003	Catalina	CSS	JUN	1.3 km	MPC · JPL
213979	2003 YW_{153}	—	December 29, 2003	Catalina	CSS	EUN	2.1 km	MPC · JPL
213980	2003 YC_{169}	—	December 18, 2003	Socorro	LINEAR	·	2.3 km	MPC · JPL
213981	2003 YR_{180}	—	December 28, 2003	Socorro	LINEAR	(32418)	3.3 km	MPC · JPL
213982	2004 AB_{5}	—	January 13, 2004	Anderson Mesa	LONEOS	·	4.1 km	MPC · JPL
213983	2004 AH_{10}	—	January 15, 2004	Kitt Peak	Spacewatch	·	2.3 km	MPC · JPL
213984	2004 AC_{15}	—	January 15, 2004	Kitt Peak	Spacewatch	·	1.5 km	MPC · JPL
213985	2004 BP_{1}	—	January 16, 2004	Palomar	NEAT	·	4.6 km	MPC · JPL
213986	2004 BO_{9}	—	January 16, 2004	Palomar	NEAT	·	2.8 km	MPC · JPL
213987	2004 BA_{10}	—	January 16, 2004	Palomar	NEAT	·	2.4 km	MPC · JPL
213988	2004 BZ_{12}	—	January 17, 2004	Palomar	NEAT	·	2.0 km	MPC · JPL
213989	2004 BU_{17}	—	January 18, 2004	Catalina	CSS	·	4.0 km	MPC · JPL
213990	2004 BF_{26}	—	January 16, 2004	Mount Graham	Ryan, W. H.	·	3.7 km	MPC · JPL
213991	2004 BK_{42}	—	January 21, 2004	Socorro	LINEAR	·	3.1 km	MPC · JPL
213992	2004 BN_{44}	—	January 22, 2004	Socorro	LINEAR	·	3.4 km	MPC · JPL
213993	2004 BX_{47}	—	January 21, 2004	Socorro	LINEAR	(5)	1.4 km	MPC · JPL
213994	2004 BZ_{47}	—	January 21, 2004	Socorro	LINEAR	·	2.4 km	MPC · JPL
213995	2004 BU_{74}	—	January 25, 2004	Haleakala	NEAT	(5)	1.9 km	MPC · JPL
213996	2004 BC_{76}	—	January 23, 2004	Socorro	LINEAR	·	3.1 km	MPC · JPL
213997	2004 BX_{76}	—	January 26, 2004	Anderson Mesa	LONEOS	·	1.9 km	MPC · JPL
213998	2004 BL_{88}	—	January 23, 2004	Socorro	LINEAR	·	1.8 km	MPC · JPL
213999	2004 BC_{104}	—	January 23, 2004	Socorro	LINEAR	·	2.9 km	MPC · JPL
214000	2004 BW_{107}	—	January 28, 2004	Catalina	CSS	BRU	3.8 km	MPC · JPL

back to top

== See also ==
- Meanings of minor-planet names: 213001–214000
