= List of Jupiter trojans (Trojan camp) (200001–300000) =

This is a partial list of Jupiter's L_{5} trojans (60° behind Jupiter) with numbers 200001–300000. If available, an object's mean diameter is taken from the NEOWISE data release, which the Small-Body Database has also adopted. Mean diameters are rounded to two significant figures if smaller than 100 kilometers. Estimates are in italics and calculated from a magnitude-to-diameter conversion, using an assumed albedo of 0.057.

== 200001–300000 ==
This list contains 269 objects sorted in numerical order.

Designation	Discovery			Orbital description					Diam.	Remarks	Refs
Designation	Date	Observer	Site	a (AU)	e	i (°)	q (AU)	Q (AU)	Diam.	Remarks	Refs
(203865) 2002 WV_{27}	16 November 2002	NEAT	Palomar	5.203	0.016	5.8	5.118	5.289	11 km	–	catalog · MPC · JPL
(211992) 2005 AV_{61}	15 January 2005	Spacewatch	Kitt Peak	5.227	0.061	8.2	4.905	5.548	12 km	–	catalog · MPC · JPL
(213180) 2000 SD_{173}	28 September 2000	LINEAR	Socorro	5.171	0.156	25.6	4.363	5.979	17 km	–	catalog · MPC · JPL
(213347) 2001 SD_{304}	20 September 2001	LINEAR	Socorro	5.156	0.047	11.0	4.913	5.398	14 km	–	catalog · MPC · JPL
(213351) 2001 SC_{333}	19 September 2001	LINEAR	Socorro	5.205	0.082	12.9	4.779	5.632	10 km	–	catalog · MPC · JPL
(213360) 2001 TO_{108}	14 October 2001	LINEAR	Socorro	5.185	0.078	23.1	4.780	5.589	14 km	–	catalog · MPC · JPL
(213394) 2001 US_{187}	17 October 2001	NEAT	Palomar	5.224	0.051	8.6	4.956	5.492	13 km	–	catalog · MPC · JPL
(214506) 2005 YW_{236}	28 December 2005	Spacewatch	Kitt Peak	5.169	0.019	2.0	5.072	5.267	9.2 km	–	catalog · MPC · JPL
(214508) 2006 AF_{84}	6 January 2006	CSS	Catalina	5.121	0.063	16.1	4.796	5.446	17 km	–	catalog · MPC · JPL
(214511) 2006 BA_{213}	29 January 2006	W. Bickel	Bergisch Gladbach	5.237	0.073	16.2	4.857	5.618	14 km	–	catalog · MPC · JPL
(214514) 2006 DB_{20}	20 February 2006	Spacewatch	Kitt Peak	5.181	0.059	16.4	4.877	5.485	14 km	–	catalog · MPC · JPL
(215020) 2009 BE_{14}	25 January 2009	Spacewatch	Kitt Peak	5.170	0.034	12.1	4.996	5.344	13 km	–	catalog · MPC · JPL
(215110) 1997 NO_{5}	5 July 1997	Spacewatch	Kitt Peak	5.186	0.106	25.2	4.637	5.735	16 km	–	catalog · MPC · JPL
(215199) 2000 SB_{130}	22 September 2000	LINEAR	Socorro	5.207	0.215	18.1	4.087	6.326	19 km	–	catalog · MPC · JPL
(215319) 2001 TA_{119}	15 October 2001	LINEAR	Socorro	5.163	0.072	27.8	4.791	5.534	17 km	–	catalog · MPC · JPL
(215331) 2001 UW_{61}	17 October 2001	LINEAR	Socorro	5.167	0.089	4.1	4.707	5.626	11 km	–	catalog · MPC · JPL
(215340) 2001 UX_{210}	21 October 2001	LINEAR	Socorro	5.126	0.063	17.5	4.800	5.451	12 km	–	catalog · MPC · JPL
(215349) 2001 VA_{128}	11 November 2001	Sloan Digital Sky Survey	Apache Point	5.154	0.119	9.2	4.542	5.766	11 km	–	catalog · MPC · JPL
(215517) 2002 UZ_{74}	18 October 2002	NEAT	Palomar	5.116	0.016	4.3	5.034	5.199	11 km	–	catalog · MPC · JPL
(215530) 2002 VE_{103}	12 November 2002	LINEAR	Socorro	5.202	0.095	19.1	4.709	5.695	19 km	–	catalog · MPC · JPL
(215542) 2002 WT_{25}	16 November 2002	NEAT	Palomar	5.147	0.073	31.7	4.773	5.521	16 km	–	catalog · MPC · JPL
(215551) 2002 YR_{36}	27 December 2002	NEAT	Palomar	5.292	0.094	6.9	4.795	5.789	12 km	–	catalog · MPC · JPL
(215822) 2004 XT_{184}	10 December 2004	Spacewatch	Kitt Peak	5.086	0.041	11.2	4.876	5.295	13 km	–	catalog · MPC · JPL
(216034) 2006 BN_{143}	28 January 2006	MLS	Mount Lemmon	5.197	0.079	25.0	4.784	5.610	15 km	–	catalog · MPC · JPL
(216291) 2007 EO_{149}	12 March 2007	MLS	Mount Lemmon	5.217	0.062	9.8	4.896	5.538	12 km	–	catalog · MPC · JPL
(216292) 2007 EM_{195}	15 March 2007	Spacewatch	Kitt Peak	5.239	0.038	2.5	5.041	5.437	10 km	–	catalog · MPC · JPL
(216293) 2007 GP_{11}	11 April 2007	Spacewatch	Kitt Peak	5.212	0.042	9.8	4.993	5.431	11 km	–	catalog · MPC · JPL
(216409) 2008 GM_{84}	8 April 2008	MLS	Mount Lemmon	5.102	0.035	5.9	4.921	5.283	11 km	–	catalog · MPC · JPL
(216551) 2001 TA_{184}	14 October 2001	LINEAR	Socorro	5.070	0.067	8.7	4.729	5.411	10 km	–	catalog · MPC · JPL
(216847) 2007 EP_{212}	8 March 2007	NEAT	Palomar	5.198	0.048	21.3	4.949	5.447	14 km	–	catalog · MPC · JPL
(216876) 2008 EL_{54}	6 March 2008	Spacewatch	Kitt Peak	5.227	0.170	12.2	4.339	6.115	12 km	–	catalog · MPC · JPL
(216877) 2008 FS_{54}	28 March 2008	MLS	Mount Lemmon	5.261	0.101	2.2	4.730	5.792	8.9 km	–	catalog · MPC · JPL
(216881) 2008 GA_{32}	3 April 2008	Spacewatch	Kitt Peak	5.194	0.060	22.9	4.882	5.507	11 km	–	catalog · MPC · JPL
(216891) 2009 DN_{43}	27 February 2009	Spacewatch	Kitt Peak	5.228	0.037	14.1	5.036	5.420	12 km	–	catalog · MPC · JPL
(216898) 2009 HJ_{84}	27 April 2009	Spacewatch	Kitt Peak	5.109	0.038	16.3	4.913	5.304	13 km	–	catalog · MPC · JPL
(217548) 2007 EW_{209}	15 March 2007	CSS	Catalina	5.239	0.159	23.7	4.406	6.073	17 km	–	catalog · MPC · JPL
(218804) 2006 BB_{252}	31 January 2006	Spacewatch	Kitt Peak	5.204	0.109	4.1	4.637	5.771	9.9 km	–	catalog · MPC · JPL
(236974) 2008 EK_{137}	11 March 2008	Spacewatch	Kitt Peak	5.202	0.085	19.3	4.761	5.642	11 km	–	catalog · MPC · JPL
(237710) 2001 UW_{184}	16 October 2001	NEAT	Palomar	5.256	0.073	17.5	4.872	5.641	14 km	–	catalog · MPC · JPL
(238623) 2005 CL_{12}	1 February 2005	Piszkesteto	Piszkesteto	5.182	0.092	26.2	4.707	5.657	13 km	–	catalog · MPC · JPL
(239521) 2008 HX_{3}	26 April 2008	F. Kugel	Dauban	5.251	0.034	18.2	5.072	5.431	15 km	–	catalog · MPC · JPL
(239903) 2000 SF_{129}	26 September 2000	LINEAR	Socorro	5.201	0.032	6.4	5.033	5.369	12 km	–	catalog · MPC · JPL
(240914) 2006 DQ_{196}	24 February 2006	Spacewatch	Kitt Peak	5.221	0.086	28.2	4.772	5.670	14 km	–	catalog · MPC · JPL
(241099) 2007 GH_{2}	6 April 2007	Astronomical Research Observatory	Charleston	5.265	0.116	15.9	4.653	5.878	14 km	–	catalog · MPC · JPL
(242843) 2006 DO_{205}	25 February 2006	MLS	Mount Lemmon	5.214	0.117	13.3	4.604	5.824	17 km	–	catalog · MPC · JPL
(243453) 2009 HX_{85}	29 April 2009	Spacewatch	Kitt Peak	5.136	0.118	18.5	4.531	5.740	15 km	–	catalog · MPC · JPL
(245279) 2005 BZ_{32}	16 January 2005	C. Veillet	Mauna Kea	5.230	0.138	21.1	4.508	5.952	14 km	–	catalog · MPC · JPL
(245682) 2006 BS_{91}	26 January 2006	Spacewatch	Kitt Peak	5.214	0.092	10.5	4.733	5.695	9.6 km	–	catalog · MPC · JPL
(246108) 2007 FT_{27}	20 March 2007	MLS	Mount Lemmon	5.207	0.103	14.4	4.671	5.743	12 km	–	catalog · MPC · JPL
(246113) 2007 GY_{69}	15 April 2007	MLS	Mount Lemmon	5.293	0.089	5.0	4.824	5.763	10 km	–	catalog · MPC · JPL
(246114) 2007 GR_{70}	15 April 2007	MLS	Mount Lemmon	5.148	0.077	9.0	4.751	5.544	12 km	–	catalog · MPC · JPL
(246523) 2008 EV_{120}	9 March 2008	Spacewatch	Kitt Peak	5.224	0.041	12.5	5.011	5.437	12 km	–	catalog · MPC · JPL
(246527) 2008 FA_{95}	29 March 2008	Spacewatch	Kitt Peak	5.234	0.053	7.2	4.957	5.511	14 km	–	catalog · MPC · JPL
(246530) 2008 GC_{106}	11 April 2008	MLS	Mount Lemmon	5.215	0.101	24.7	4.689	5.741	11 km	–	catalog · MPC · JPL
(246533) 2008 HT_{41}	26 April 2008	MLS	Mount Lemmon	5.204	0.092	1.0	4.728	5.681	9.0 km	–	catalog · MPC · JPL
(246534) 2008 KG_{43}	31 May 2008	Spacewatch	Kitt Peak	5.271	0.050	17.0	5.005	5.537	14 km	–	catalog · MPC · JPL
(246817) 2009 KH_{1}	17 May 2009	OAM	La Sagra	5.172	0.018	26.9	5.081	5.263	15 km	–	catalog · MPC · JPL
(246891) 1997 JY_{10}	8 May 1997	Spacewatch	Kitt Peak	5.142	0.031	18.8	4.984	5.300	10 km	–	catalog · MPC · JPL
(247102) 2000 SA_{315}	28 September 2000	LINEAR	Socorro	5.242	0.070	17.5	4.874	5.610	14 km	–	catalog · MPC · JPL
(247297) 2001 SH_{354}	26 September 2001	NEAT	Palomar	5.157	0.050	22.0	4.897	5.418	18 km	–	catalog · MPC · JPL
(247315) 2001 TP_{176}	14 October 2001	LINEAR	Socorro	5.235	0.038	19.1	5.037	5.433	16 km	–	catalog · MPC · JPL
(247323) 2001 TY_{232}	15 October 2001	Spacewatch	Kitt Peak	5.235	0.070	11.7	4.869	5.602	13 km	–	catalog · MPC · JPL
(247341) 2001 UV_{209}	20 October 2001	NEAT	Haleakala	5.215	0.067	25.8	4.865	5.565	16 km	–	catalog · MPC · JPL
(247351) 2001 VB_{52}	10 November 2001	LINEAR	Socorro	5.170	0.097	21.2	4.670	5.670	16 km	–	catalog · MPC · JPL
(247653) 2002 WE_{28}	24 November 2002	NEAT	Palomar	5.150	0.085	21.8	4.713	5.587	11 km	–	catalog · MPC · JPL
(247946) 2003 YE_{20}	17 December 2003	Spacewatch	Kitt Peak	5.242	0.070	27.8	4.876	5.608	12 km	–	catalog · MPC · JPL
(247967) 2003 YD_{149}	29 December 2003	CSS	Catalina	5.214	0.017	27.0	5.128	5.301	21 km	–	catalog · MPC · JPL
(247969) 2004 AG_{17}	15 January 2004	Spacewatch	Kitt Peak	5.286	0.098	17.0	4.769	5.802	15 km	–	catalog · MPC · JPL
248183 Peisandros	13 January 2005	M. Ory	Vicques	5.168	0.056	15.0	4.879	5.456	12 km	–	catalog · MPC · JPL
(248186) 2005 AY_{82}	6 January 2005	CSS	Catalina	5.177	0.055	19.0	4.890	5.464	21 km	–	catalog · MPC · JPL
(248189) 2005 BE_{17}	16 January 2005	Spacewatch	Kitt Peak	5.199	0.027	5.8	5.057	5.342	16 km	–	catalog · MPC · JPL
(248238) 2005 EQ_{249}	13 March 2005	MLS	Mount Lemmon	5.186	0.048	28.0	4.936	5.436	18 km	–	catalog · MPC · JPL
(248550) 2005 XS_{92}	10 December 2005	Spacewatch	Kitt Peak	5.270	0.021	26.2	5.158	5.382	14 km	–	catalog · MPC · JPL
(248575) 2006 BC_{33}	21 January 2006	Spacewatch	Kitt Peak	5.279	0.129	27.9	4.600	5.958	13 km	–	catalog · MPC · JPL
(248603) 2006 DB_{43}	20 February 2006	Spacewatch	Kitt Peak	5.237	0.049	9.1	4.979	5.495	9.0 km	–	catalog · MPC · JPL
(248670) 2006 JV_{25}	3 May 2006	MLS	Mount Lemmon	5.195	0.118	24.2	4.579	5.810	14 km	–	catalog · MPC · JPL
(248976) 2007 DM_{97}	23 February 2007	Spacewatch	Kitt Peak	5.205	0.082	12.2	4.780	5.630	10 km	–	catalog · MPC · JPL
(248978) 2007 DH_{111}	23 February 2007	Spacewatch	Kitt Peak	5.244	0.079	13.1	4.828	5.660	10 km	–	catalog · MPC · JPL
(248979) 2007 DY_{113}	23 February 2007	Spacewatch	Kitt Peak	5.267	0.099	30.2	4.744	5.789	10 km	–	catalog · MPC · JPL
(248985) 2007 EU_{147}	12 March 2007	MLS	Mount Lemmon	5.221	0.180	10.6	4.283	6.160	10 km	–	catalog · MPC · JPL
(248986) 2007 EX_{147}	12 March 2007	MLS	Mount Lemmon	5.274	0.088	29.1	4.808	5.740	17 km	–	catalog · MPC · JPL
(248990) 2007 FX_{3}	18 March 2007	Nyukasa	Nyukasa	5.151	0.059	20.8	4.845	5.458	16 km	–	catalog · MPC · JPL
(248991) 2007 FL_{22}	20 March 2007	Spacewatch	Kitt Peak	5.231	0.120	12.6	4.604	5.857	12 km	–	catalog · MPC · JPL
(248996) 2007 HK_{62}	22 April 2007	MLS	Mount Lemmon	5.285	0.082	16.4	4.851	5.719	16 km	–	catalog · MPC · JPL
(249180) 2008 CE_{117}	12 February 2008	Spacewatch	Kitt Peak	5.272	0.073	25.3	4.889	5.655	15 km	–	catalog · MPC · JPL
(249212) 2008 DL_{84}	18 February 2008	MLS	Mount Lemmon	5.238	0.170	25.6	4.350	6.126	13 km	–	catalog · MPC · JPL
(249225) 2008 FJ_{69}	28 March 2008	MLS	Mount Lemmon	5.181	0.069	7.7	4.826	5.536	12 km	–	catalog · MPC · JPL
(249236) 2008 GE_{122}	13 April 2008	Spacewatch	Kitt Peak	5.205	0.132	12.6	4.516	5.894	9.1 km	–	catalog · MPC · JPL
(249237) 2008 HJ_{10}	24 April 2008	MLS	Mount Lemmon	5.228	0.121	14.2	4.595	5.861	13 km	–	catalog · MPC · JPL
(249465) 2009 HV_{102}	29 April 2009	PMO NEO Survey Program	Purple Mountain	5.189	0.202	11.6	4.141	6.237	11 km	–	catalog · MPC · JPL
(249476) 2009 LS_{6}	15 June 2009	Spacewatch	Kitt Peak	5.153	0.053	32.8	4.879	5.428	15 km	–	catalog · MPC · JPL
(249545) 2010 HB_{45}	23 April 2010	WISE	WISE	5.276	0.075	5.6	4.880	5.672	12 km	–	catalog · MPC · JPL
(249755) 2000 SJ_{350}	29 September 2000	LONEOS	Anderson Mesa	5.176	0.075	22.6	4.787	5.564	16 km	–	catalog · MPC · JPL
(249995) 2001 XO_{128}	14 December 2001	LINEAR	Socorro	5.310	0.086	25.1	4.855	5.766	16 km	–	catalog · MPC · JPL
(251528) 2008 GU_{141}	14 April 2008	MLS	Mount Lemmon	5.252	0.042	8.1	5.032	5.472	11 km	–	catalog · MPC · JPL
(251534) 2008 KK_{4}	27 May 2008	Spacewatch	Kitt Peak	5.301	0.019	12.2	5.201	5.402	11 km	–	catalog · MPC · JPL
(251535) 2008 KK_{8}	27 May 2008	Spacewatch	Kitt Peak	5.206	0.059	4.6	4.897	5.515	9.4 km	–	catalog · MPC · JPL
(256505) 2007 EY_{98}	11 March 2007	Spacewatch	Kitt Peak	5.206	0.125	4.4	4.557	5.855	12 km	–	catalog · MPC · JPL
(257173) 2008 JF_{13}	3 May 2008	Spacewatch	Kitt Peak	5.249	0.043	12.5	5.022	5.476	12 km	–	catalog · MPC · JPL
(257899) 2000 TR_{27}	3 October 2000	LINEAR	Socorro	5.230	0.097	5.2	4.720	5.739	13 km	–	catalog · MPC · JPL
(258239) 2001 TX_{121}	15 October 2001	LINEAR	Socorro	5.220	0.034	14.3	5.042	5.397	15 km	–	catalog · MPC · JPL
(258365) 2001 WW_{65}	20 November 2001	LINEAR	Socorro	5.360	0.069	1.1	4.989	5.730	9.8 km	–	catalog · MPC · JPL
(261763) 2006 BC_{56}	23 January 2006	MLS	Mount Lemmon	5.144	0.033	5.1	4.977	5.311	12 km	–	catalog · MPC · JPL
(261774) 2006 BT_{96}	26 January 2006	Spacewatch	Kitt Peak	5.154	0.036	15.7	4.967	5.342	14 km	–	catalog · MPC · JPL
(261781) 2006 BG_{132}	26 January 2006	Spacewatch	Kitt Peak	5.207	0.044	18.9	4.976	5.439	12 km	–	catalog · MPC · JPL
(261789) 2006 BW_{158}	26 January 2006	Spacewatch	Kitt Peak	5.191	0.114	9.5	4.597	5.785	9.0 km	–	catalog · MPC · JPL
(261791) 2006 BM_{168}	26 January 2006	Spacewatch	Kitt Peak	5.227	0.063	10.1	4.895	5.558	11 km	–	catalog · MPC · JPL
(263012) 2007 ES_{166}	11 March 2007	MLS	Mount Lemmon	5.209	0.106	14.3	4.659	5.760	10 km	–	catalog · MPC · JPL
(263699) 2008 HV_{11}	24 April 2008	Spacewatch	Kitt Peak	5.191	0.060	10.3	4.878	5.505	11 km	–	catalog · MPC · JPL
(275681) 2000 SQ_{33}	24 September 2000	LINEAR	Socorro	5.198	0.143	25.0	4.456	5.939	20 km	–	catalog · MPC · JPL
(275682) 2000 ST_{49}	23 September 2000	LINEAR	Socorro	5.165	0.141	27.7	4.436	5.894	14 km	–	catalog · MPC · JPL
(278163) 2007 DO_{35}	17 February 2007	Spacewatch	Kitt Peak	5.157	0.110	23.4	4.589	5.724	11 km	–	catalog · MPC · JPL
(278572) 2008 HB_{21}	26 April 2008	Spacewatch	Kitt Peak	5.239	0.056	16.5	4.948	5.530	10 km	–	catalog · MPC · JPL
(280987) 2006 DQ_{88}	24 February 2006	Spacewatch	Kitt Peak	5.252	0.047	12.8	5.008	5.497	12 km	–	catalog · MPC · JPL
(282192) 2001 TB_{229}	15 October 2001	LINEAR	Socorro	5.223	0.087	14.1	4.768	5.678	12 km	–	catalog · MPC · JPL
(282198) 2001 UM_{166}	23 October 2001	Spacewatch	Kitt Peak	5.298	0.047	7.1	5.051	5.545	13 km	–	catalog · MPC · JPL
(282336) 2002 VT	1 November 2002	NEAT	Palomar	5.194	0.043	9.2	4.972	5.416	14 km	–	catalog · MPC · JPL
(282711) 2006 BX_{193}	30 January 2006	Spacewatch	Kitt Peak	5.196	0.057	4.4	4.899	5.492	8.6 km	–	catalog · MPC · JPL
(283173) 2009 HZ_{62}	22 April 2009	Spacewatch	Kitt Peak	5.222	0.047	12.6	4.978	5.466	13 km	–	catalog · MPC · JPL
(283178) 2009 SF_{1}	17 September 2009	MLS	Mount Lemmon	5.207	0.166	14.6	4.343	6.070	9.8 km	–	catalog · MPC · JPL
(283396) 2000 RC_{98}	5 September 2000	LONEOS	Anderson Mesa	5.203	0.138	25.4	4.486	5.919	17 km	–	catalog · MPC · JPL
(283401) 2000 SV_{15}	23 September 2000	LINEAR	Socorro	5.223	0.111	16.0	4.641	5.804	17 km	–	catalog · MPC · JPL
(283402) 2000 SX_{16}	23 September 2000	LINEAR	Socorro	5.215	0.066	17.1	4.871	5.558	17 km	–	catalog · MPC · JPL
(283419) 2000 SK_{201}	24 September 2000	LINEAR	Socorro	5.184	0.178	17.5	4.262	6.105	13 km	–	catalog · MPC · JPL
(283424) 2000 SN_{317}	30 September 2000	LINEAR	Socorro	5.196	0.100	28.4	4.679	5.713	16 km	–	catalog · MPC · JPL
(283510) 2001 SD_{355}	19 September 2001	NEAT	Palomar	5.152	0.094	20.5	4.669	5.636	14 km	–	catalog · MPC · JPL
(283512) 2001 TH_{24}	14 October 2001	LINEAR	Socorro	5.155	0.029	16.2	5.003	5.307	15 km	–	catalog · MPC · JPL
(283513) 2001 TN_{24}	14 October 2001	LINEAR	Socorro	5.203	0.115	5.1	4.603	5.803	15 km	–	catalog · MPC · JPL
(283519) 2001 TP_{47}	14 October 2001	Asiago-DLR Asteroid Survey	Cima Ekar	5.230	0.065	10.7	4.893	5.568	13 km	–	catalog · MPC · JPL
(283532) 2001 TW_{184}	14 October 2001	LINEAR	Socorro	5.227	0.068	11.4	4.874	5.581	13 km	–	catalog · MPC · JPL
(283538) 2001 TB_{234}	15 October 2001	Spacewatch	Kitt Peak	5.154	0.061	3.3	4.841	5.468	12 km	–	catalog · MPC · JPL
(283543) 2001 UG_{59}	17 October 2001	LINEAR	Socorro	5.119	0.127	14.4	4.469	5.770	9.9 km	–	catalog · MPC · JPL
(283549) 2001 UJ_{134}	21 October 2001	LINEAR	Socorro	5.191	0.139	34.5	4.471	5.911	11 km	–	catalog · MPC · JPL
(283553) 2001 UJ_{225}	16 October 2001	NEAT	Palomar	5.121	0.085	10.4	4.684	5.558	9.1 km	–	catalog · MPC · JPL
(283560) 2001 VF_{56}	10 November 2001	LINEAR	Socorro	5.197	0.081	29.2	4.774	5.619	13 km	–	catalog · MPC · JPL
(283732) 2002 VB_{68}	7 November 2002	Spacewatch	Kitt Peak	5.170	0.164	11.6	4.320	6.019	9.9 km	–	catalog · MPC · JPL
(284044) 2005 AA_{51}	13 January 2005	Spacewatch	Kitt Peak	5.222	0.102	8.0	4.692	5.752	12 km	–	catalog · MPC · JPL
(284046) 2005 AU_{61}	15 January 2005	Spacewatch	Kitt Peak	5.179	0.082	19.6	4.756	5.603	15 km	–	catalog · MPC · JPL
(284047) 2005 AC_{77}	15 January 2005	Spacewatch	Kitt Peak	5.269	0.087	19.8	4.813	5.725	16 km	–	catalog · MPC · JPL
(284173) 2005 YL_{282}	26 December 2005	MLS	Mount Lemmon	5.136	0.066	12.1	4.799	5.474	11 km	–	catalog · MPC · JPL
(284184) 2006 AX_{80}	8 January 2006	MLS	Mount Lemmon	5.121	0.063	16.8	4.800	5.443	13 km	–	catalog · MPC · JPL
(284192) 2006 BR_{12}	21 January 2006	Spacewatch	Kitt Peak	5.261	0.083	10.8	4.824	5.699	13 km	–	catalog · MPC · JPL
(284204) 2006 BM_{192}	30 January 2006	Spacewatch	Kitt Peak	5.170	0.142	19.0	4.437	5.904	12 km	–	catalog · MPC · JPL
(284217) 2006 CG_{18}	1 February 2006	MLS	Mount Lemmon	5.184	0.076	17.4	4.791	5.577	14 km	–	catalog · MPC · JPL
(284219) 2006 CQ_{36}	2 February 2006	MLS	Mount Lemmon	5.242	0.030	6.3	5.083	5.401	11 km	–	catalog · MPC · JPL
(284226) 2006 DF_{44}	20 February 2006	CSS	Catalina	5.152	0.071	27.3	4.784	5.520	13 km	–	catalog · MPC · JPL
(284433) 2007 DU_{52}	19 February 2007	MLS	Mount Lemmon	5.202	0.174	10.0	4.298	6.106	13 km	–	catalog · MPC · JPL
(284436) 2007 DR_{96}	23 February 2007	MLS	Mount Lemmon	5.180	0.072	23.9	4.809	5.551	17 km	–	catalog · MPC · JPL
(284442) 2007 ES_{40}	9 March 2007	Spacewatch	Kitt Peak	5.131	0.012	9.3	5.068	5.194	11 km	–	catalog · MPC · JPL
(284443) 2007 EE_{51}	10 March 2007	Spacewatch	Kitt Peak	5.263	0.030	10.2	5.105	5.422	8.9 km	–	catalog · MPC · JPL
(284447) 2007 ET_{144}	12 March 2007	MLS	Mount Lemmon	5.175	0.081	4.8	4.755	5.595	9.6 km	–	catalog · MPC · JPL
(284452) 2007 EU_{218}	11 March 2007	MLS	Mount Lemmon	5.167	0.156	1.7	4.362	5.973	9.5 km	–	catalog · MPC · JPL
(284454) 2007 EX_{221}	9 March 2007	Spacewatch	Kitt Peak	5.129	0.107	20.8	4.582	5.677	12 km	–	catalog · MPC · JPL
(284459) 2007 GG_{10}	11 April 2007	Spacewatch	Kitt Peak	5.238	0.060	19.0	4.921	5.555	12 km	–	catalog · MPC · JPL
(284663) 2008 FD_{63}	27 March 2008	Spacewatch	Kitt Peak	5.279	0.096	10.3	4.771	5.788	10 km	–	catalog · MPC · JPL
(284664) 2008 FW_{132}	30 March 2008	Spacewatch	Kitt Peak	5.109	0.070	5.3	4.753	5.465	10 km	–	catalog · MPC · JPL
(284665) 2008 FW_{134}	30 March 2008	Spacewatch	Kitt Peak	5.203	0.132	9.1	4.515	5.891	10 km	–	catalog · MPC · JPL
(284666) 2008 GP_{42}	4 April 2008	Spacewatch	Kitt Peak	5.189	0.052	7.5	4.919	5.458	14 km	–	catalog · MPC · JPL
(284667) 2008 GJ_{74}	7 April 2008	Spacewatch	Kitt Peak	5.160	0.083	10.6	4.732	5.589	10 km	–	catalog · MPC · JPL
(284882) 2009 FY_{59}	31 March 2009	MLS	Mount Lemmon	5.145	0.089	9.3	4.686	5.603	11 km	–	catalog · MPC · JPL
(284883) 2009 FB_{63}	26 March 2009	Spacewatch	Kitt Peak	5.180	0.047	8.2	4.937	5.424	12 km	–	catalog · MPC · JPL
(284887) 2009 KE_{9}	24 May 2009	CSS	Catalina	5.157	0.012	23.0	5.094	5.219	16 km	–	catalog · MPC · JPL
(285223) 1997 MV_{7}	29 June 1997	Spacewatch	Kitt Peak	5.220	0.116	12.2	4.615	5.825	13 km	–	catalog · MPC · JPL
(285648) 2000 SK_{27}	23 September 2000	LINEAR	Socorro	5.193	0.126	16.7	4.537	5.849	14 km	–	catalog · MPC · JPL
(285658) 2000 SY_{48}	23 September 2000	LINEAR	Socorro	5.189	0.126	20.5	4.538	5.841	14 km	–	catalog · MPC · JPL
(286106) 2001 TM_{94}	14 October 2001	LINEAR	Socorro	5.146	0.114	19.7	4.558	5.734	16 km	–	catalog · MPC · JPL
(286110) 2001 TQ_{99}	14 October 2001	LINEAR	Socorro	5.148	0.076	13.5	4.758	5.539	13 km	–	catalog · MPC · JPL
(286114) 2001 TV_{119}	15 October 2001	LINEAR	Socorro	5.195	0.037	21.9	5.002	5.388	17 km	–	catalog · MPC · JPL
(286200) 2001 UC_{69}	17 October 2001	Spacewatch	Kitt Peak	5.177	0.045	10.5	4.946	5.407	13 km	–	catalog · MPC · JPL
(286227) 2001 UV_{140}	23 October 2001	LINEAR	Socorro	5.178	0.082	9.3	4.751	5.605	12 km	–	catalog · MPC · JPL
(286310) 2001 WF_{54}	19 November 2001	LINEAR	Socorro	5.187	0.094	4.4	4.701	5.674	11 km	–	catalog · MPC · JPL
(287454) 2002 YX_{7}	30 December 2002	Y.-B. Jeon; B.-C. Lee	Bohyunsan	5.325	0.075	28.6	4.926	5.724	17 km	–	catalog · MPC · JPL
(288095) 2003 WD_{18}	19 November 2003	NEAT	Palomar	5.168	0.039	10.6	4.967	5.368	11 km	–	catalog · MPC · JPL
(288282) 2004 AH_{4}	15 January 2004	Spacewatch	Kitt Peak	5.280	0.177	35.3	4.347	6.214	15 km	–	catalog · MPC · JPL
(288316) 2004 BH_{39}	21 January 2004	LINEAR	Socorro	5.238	0.035	29.7	5.055	5.421	15 km	–	catalog · MPC · JPL
(289285) 2004 XZ_{181}	15 December 2004	Spacewatch	Kitt Peak	5.187	0.067	8.5	4.841	5.533	15 km	–	catalog · MPC · JPL
(289327) 2005 AZ_{51}	13 January 2005	Spacewatch	Kitt Peak	5.210	0.051	9.8	4.942	5.477	11 km	–	catalog · MPC · JPL
(289501) 2005 EJ_{133}	9 March 2005	CSS	Catalina	5.241	0.050	26.8	4.978	5.504	18 km	–	catalog · MPC · JPL
(291251) 2006 BM_{54}	25 January 2006	Spacewatch	Kitt Peak	5.228	0.098	10.7	4.716	5.739	9.9 km	–	catalog · MPC · JPL
(291255) 2006 BZ_{55}	26 January 2006	MLS	Mount Lemmon	5.260	0.044	20.8	5.029	5.492	14 km	–	catalog · MPC · JPL
(291260) 2006 BE_{73}	23 January 2006	Spacewatch	Kitt Peak	5.135	0.088	8.3	4.684	5.585	9.1 km	–	catalog · MPC · JPL
(291276) 2006 BE_{98}	27 January 2006	MLS	Mount Lemmon	5.245	0.061	31.3	4.927	5.563	13 km	–	catalog · MPC · JPL
(291297) 2006 BS_{138}	28 January 2006	MLS	Mount Lemmon	5.230	0.107	18.3	4.671	5.790	15 km	–	catalog · MPC · JPL
(291301) 2006 BC_{142}	26 January 2006	Spacewatch	Kitt Peak	5.151	0.027	18.1	5.015	5.288	14 km	–	catalog · MPC · JPL
(291316) 2006 BE_{167}	26 January 2006	MLS	Mount Lemmon	5.196	0.082	25.4	4.772	5.620	11 km	–	catalog · MPC · JPL
(291327) 2006 BQ_{194}	30 January 2006	Spacewatch	Kitt Peak	5.165	0.113	5.6	4.579	5.750	11 km	–	catalog · MPC · JPL
(291348) 2006 BH_{242}	31 January 2006	Spacewatch	Kitt Peak	5.157	0.063	4.6	4.833	5.480	10 km	–	catalog · MPC · JPL
(291385) 2006 CZ_{32}	2 February 2006	Spacewatch	Kitt Peak	5.185	0.073	9.2	4.807	5.563	13 km	–	catalog · MPC · JPL
(291390) 2006 CG_{43}	2 February 2006	Spacewatch	Kitt Peak	5.265	0.020	9.0	5.162	5.369	9.5 km	–	catalog · MPC · JPL
(291429) 2006 DD_{27}	20 February 2006	Spacewatch	Kitt Peak	5.305	0.028	5.0	5.158	5.452	11 km	–	catalog · MPC · JPL
(291437) 2006 DO_{32}	20 February 2006	MLS	Mount Lemmon	5.299	0.038	4.2	5.099	5.499	11 km	–	catalog · MPC · JPL
(291471) 2006 DY_{83}	24 February 2006	Spacewatch	Kitt Peak	5.230	0.046	7.6	4.989	5.472	9.5 km	–	catalog · MPC · JPL
(291485) 2006 DU_{103}	25 February 2006	MLS	Mount Lemmon	5.279	0.044	6.6	5.049	5.508	11 km	–	catalog · MPC · JPL
(291495) 2006 DA_{131}	25 February 2006	Spacewatch	Kitt Peak	5.288	0.079	7.8	4.868	5.708	11 km	–	catalog · MPC · JPL
(291519) 2006 DF_{214}	24 February 2006	MLS	Mount Lemmon	5.153	0.091	16.1	4.682	5.623	11 km	–	catalog · MPC · JPL
(291557) 2006 FC_{2}	23 March 2006	MLS	Mount Lemmon	5.160	0.069	24.3	4.802	5.517	13 km	–	catalog · MPC · JPL
(291807) 2006 KG_{89}	29 May 2006	MLS	Mount Lemmon	5.210	0.094	23.9	4.719	5.702	18 km	–	catalog · MPC · JPL
(293307) 2007 DQ_{37}	17 February 2007	Spacewatch	Kitt Peak	5.184	0.097	23.3	4.682	5.685	9.6 km	–	catalog · MPC · JPL
(293331) 2007 DY_{68}	21 February 2007	Spacewatch	Kitt Peak	5.143	0.082	7.3	4.723	5.563	9.6 km	–	catalog · MPC · JPL
(293370) 2007 EF_{17}	9 March 2007	MLS	Mount Lemmon	5.144	0.094	16.8	4.662	5.627	12 km	–	catalog · MPC · JPL
(293386) 2007 EW_{43}	9 March 2007	Spacewatch	Kitt Peak	5.180	0.082	18.6	4.753	5.607	13 km	–	catalog · MPC · JPL
(293418) 2007 EK_{105}	11 March 2007	MLS	Mount Lemmon	5.207	0.113	9.0	4.620	5.793	12 km	–	catalog · MPC · JPL
(293456) 2007 EW_{191}	13 March 2007	Spacewatch	Kitt Peak	5.185	0.020	5.9	5.084	5.286	10 km	–	catalog · MPC · JPL
(293486) 2007 FA_{28}	20 March 2007	MLS	Mount Lemmon	5.234	0.072	26.6	4.857	5.611	17 km	–	catalog · MPC · JPL
(293502) 2007 GO_{10}	11 April 2007	Spacewatch	Kitt Peak	5.137	0.047	20.1	4.897	5.376	8.5 km	–	catalog · MPC · JPL
(293516) 2007 GU_{34}	14 April 2007	Spacewatch	Kitt Peak	5.201	0.038	7.0	5.005	5.397	9.7 km	–	catalog · MPC · JPL
(293557) 2007 HS_{38}	20 April 2007	MLS	Mount Lemmon	5.194	0.028	6.2	5.048	5.341	11 km	–	catalog · MPC · JPL
(295021) 2008 EH_{68}	10 March 2008	MLS	Mount Lemmon	5.254	0.076	28.3	4.854	5.653	14 km	–	catalog · MPC · JPL
(295024) 2008 ET_{73}	7 March 2008	Spacewatch	Kitt Peak	5.210	0.040	5.9	5.001	5.418	11 km	–	catalog · MPC · JPL
(295140) 2008 FT_{39}	28 March 2008	Spacewatch	Kitt Peak	5.242	0.040	7.5	5.033	5.452	9.2 km	–	catalog · MPC · JPL
(295153) 2008 FX_{57}	28 March 2008	MLS	Mount Lemmon	5.155	0.041	22.2	4.943	5.367	13 km	–	catalog · MPC · JPL
(295170) 2008 FO_{72}	30 March 2008	Spacewatch	Kitt Peak	5.168	0.104	9.5	4.628	5.708	10 km	–	catalog · MPC · JPL
(295199) 2008 FG_{111}	31 March 2008	Spacewatch	Kitt Peak	5.214	0.084	11.8	4.778	5.651	10 km	–	catalog · MPC · JPL
(295205) 2008 FW_{122}	28 March 2008	Spacewatch	Kitt Peak	5.201	0.194	9.1	4.192	6.209	9.3 km	–	catalog · MPC · JPL
(295207) 2008 FV_{123}	29 March 2008	Spacewatch	Kitt Peak	5.190	0.090	23.0	4.720	5.659	11 km	–	catalog · MPC · JPL
(295217) 2008 FZ_{132}	30 March 2008	Spacewatch	Kitt Peak	5.191	0.085	31.0	4.751	5.631	12 km	–	catalog · MPC · JPL
(295226) 2008 GC_{7}	1 April 2008	Spacewatch	Kitt Peak	5.091	0.070	19.5	4.732	5.449	13 km	–	catalog · MPC · JPL
(295256) 2008 GW_{49}	5 April 2008	Spacewatch	Kitt Peak	5.214	0.109	5.0	4.645	5.784	10 km	–	catalog · MPC · JPL
(295315) 2008 GR_{131}	4 April 2008	Spacewatch	Kitt Peak	5.188	0.052	29.7	4.917	5.459	14 km	–	catalog · MPC · JPL
(295323) 2008 GV_{140}	11 April 2008	MLS	Mount Lemmon	5.207	0.056	16.6	4.917	5.498	12 km	–	catalog · MPC · JPL
(295326) 2008 GQ_{143}	1 April 2008	MLS	Mount Lemmon	5.275	0.109	15.2	4.700	5.849	12 km	–	catalog · MPC · JPL
(295329) 2008 HG_{2}	24 April 2008	Andrushivka	Andrushivka	5.200	0.045	10.3	4.968	5.432	13 km	–	catalog · MPC · JPL
(295336) 2008 HY_{8}	24 April 2008	Spacewatch	Kitt Peak	5.184	0.005	18.1	5.157	5.211	13 km	–	catalog · MPC · JPL
(295337) 2008 HB_{9}	24 April 2008	Spacewatch	Kitt Peak	5.191	0.094	31.6	4.705	5.677	10 km	–	catalog · MPC · JPL
(295340) 2008 HL_{12}	24 April 2008	Spacewatch	Kitt Peak	5.272	0.028	23.3	5.123	5.421	11 km	–	catalog · MPC · JPL
(295342) 2008 HU_{15}	25 April 2008	Spacewatch	Kitt Peak	5.298	0.072	10.4	4.915	5.681	10 km	–	catalog · MPC · JPL
(295347) 2008 HS_{24}	27 April 2008	Spacewatch	Kitt Peak	5.309	0.095	21.4	4.805	5.813	12 km	–	catalog · MPC · JPL
(295372) 2008 HR_{56}	30 April 2008	Spacewatch	Kitt Peak	5.168	0.104	2.1	4.629	5.708	9.3 km	–	catalog · MPC · JPL
(295383) 2008 HX_{69}	30 April 2008	MLS	Mount Lemmon	5.270	0.032	18.7	5.101	5.440	10 km	–	catalog · MPC · JPL
(295395) 2008 JO_{7}	3 May 2008	MLS	Mount Lemmon	5.204	0.031	18.7	5.045	5.363	11 km	–	catalog · MPC · JPL
(295412) 2008 JR_{28}	8 May 2008	Spacewatch	Kitt Peak	5.224	0.051	12.9	4.958	5.489	13 km	–	catalog · MPC · JPL
(295413) 2008 JH_{30}	11 May 2008	Spacewatch	Kitt Peak	5.271	0.052	6.2	4.997	5.545	11 km	–	catalog · MPC · JPL
(295431) 2008 KG_{36}	29 May 2008	Spacewatch	Kitt Peak	5.270	0.062	13.6	4.943	5.597	13 km	–	catalog · MPC · JPL
(295432) 2008 KT_{37}	30 May 2008	Spacewatch	Kitt Peak	5.194	0.069	13.0	4.837	5.552	12 km	–	catalog · MPC · JPL
(295437) 2008 LF_{6}	3 June 2008	Spacewatch	Kitt Peak	5.233	0.061	7.8	4.915	5.552	9.7 km	–	catalog · MPC · JPL
(296499) 2009 JO_{15}	3 May 2009	MLS	Mount Lemmon	5.152	0.065	21.7	4.818	5.487	11 km	–	catalog · MPC · JPL
(296513) 2009 KB_{22}	25 May 2009	MLS	Mount Lemmon	5.270	0.076	27.0	4.869	5.670	10 km	–	catalog · MPC · JPL
(297019) 2010 GN_{23}	1 April 2010	WISE	WISE	5.156	0.048	32.6	4.907	5.404	14 km	–	catalog · MPC · JPL
(297047) 2010 HT_{21}	15 April 1996	Spacewatch	Kitt Peak	5.262	0.053	27.9	4.981	5.544	11 km	–	catalog · MPC · JPL
(297048) 2010 HD_{24}	21 October 2001	Spacewatch	Kitt Peak	5.268	0.061	14.8	4.949	5.588	13 km	–	catalog · MPC · JPL
(297049) 2010 HS_{48}	24 April 2010	WISE	WISE	5.293	0.041	4.2	5.079	5.508	13 km	–	catalog · MPC · JPL
(297052) 2010 HB_{81}	28 April 2010	WISE	WISE	5.240	0.064	19.9	4.903	5.578	17 km	–	catalog · MPC · JPL
(297056) 2010 HA_{109}	29 April 2010	WISE	WISE	5.281	0.132	16.9	4.585	5.976	8.7 km	–	catalog · MPC · JPL
(297057) 2010 HU_{111}	18 December 2004	MLS	Mount Lemmon	5.193	0.145	26.1	4.439	5.947	17 km	–	catalog · MPC · JPL
(297059) 2010 JV	1 May 2010	WISE	WISE	5.290	0.065	21.6	4.946	5.633	17 km	–	catalog · MPC · JPL
(297215) 2011 JJ	30 April 2008	MLS	Mount Lemmon	5.083	0.034	22.8	4.912	5.253	12 km	–	catalog · MPC · JPL
(297218) 2011 KT_{16}	14 June 2010	MLS	Mount Lemmon	5.231	0.087	10.3	4.778	5.684	13 km	–	catalog · MPC · JPL
(297221) 2011 OF_{18}	20 November 2001	Spacewatch	Kitt Peak	5.238	0.217	0.4	4.104	6.372	8.7 km	–	catalog · MPC · JPL
(297442) 2000 SF_{191}	24 September 2000	LINEAR	Socorro	5.179	0.089	21.8	4.719	5.640	14 km	–	catalog · MPC · JPL
(297644) 2001 TJ_{176}	14 October 2001	LINEAR	Socorro	5.176	0.095	12.9	4.683	5.668	12 km	–	catalog · MPC · JPL
(297692) 2001 UN_{228}	29 October 2001	NEAT	Palomar	5.225	0.112	14.5	4.639	5.811	12 km	–	catalog · MPC · JPL
(298254) 2002 VG_{78}	7 November 2002	LINEAR	Socorro	5.183	0.111	18.3	4.610	5.756	13 km	–	catalog · MPC · JPL
(298614) 2003 YD_{179}	19 December 2003	Spacewatch	Kitt Peak	5.328	0.060	7.1	5.007	5.649	13 km	–	catalog · MPC · JPL
(299061) 2005 CE_{31}	1 February 2005	Spacewatch	Kitt Peak	5.264	0.033	4.6	5.090	5.438	9.2 km	–	catalog · MPC · JPL
(299062) 2005 CC_{34}	2 February 2005	Spacewatch	Kitt Peak	5.177	0.067	8.5	4.832	5.521	11 km	–	catalog · MPC · JPL
(299447) 2006 BY_{41}	22 January 2006	MLS	Mount Lemmon	5.158	0.043	24.5	4.936	5.380	11 km	–	catalog · MPC · JPL
(299465) 2006 BL_{103}	23 January 2006	D. Healy	Junk Bond	5.156	0.038	17.5	4.958	5.354	8.3 km	–	catalog · MPC · JPL
(299473) 2006 BO_{132}	26 January 2006	Spacewatch	Kitt Peak	5.283	0.061	1.0	4.959	5.608	8.5 km	–	catalog · MPC · JPL
(299479) 2006 BX_{160}	26 January 2006	Spacewatch	Kitt Peak	5.230	0.104	6.1	4.686	5.773	8.2 km	–	catalog · MPC · JPL
(299491) 2006 BY_{198}	30 January 2006	CSS	Catalina	5.222	0.056	29.0	4.931	5.514	15 km	–	catalog · MPC · JPL
(299511) 2006 CQ_{17}	1 February 2006	Spacewatch	Kitt Peak	5.266	0.059	27.8	4.957	5.575	15 km	–	catalog · MPC · JPL
(299523) 2006 DF_{2}	20 February 2006	Spacewatch	Kitt Peak	5.206	0.130	23.5	4.529	5.883	12 km	–	catalog · MPC · JPL
(299524) 2006 DW_{4}	20 February 2006	Spacewatch	Kitt Peak	5.258	0.075	10.1	4.862	5.653	9.2 km	–	catalog · MPC · JPL
(299537) 2006 DC_{50}	22 February 2006	CSS	Catalina	5.230	0.011	22.4	5.172	5.288	11 km	–	catalog · MPC · JPL
(299547) 2006 DQ_{99}	25 February 2006	Spacewatch	Kitt Peak	5.257	0.110	11.2	4.681	5.834	11 km	–	catalog · MPC · JPL
(299551) 2006 DH_{127}	25 February 2006	Spacewatch	Kitt Peak	5.216	0.073	3.7	4.835	5.596	9.4 km	–	catalog · MPC · JPL
(299552) 2006 DN_{127}	25 February 2006	MLS	Mount Lemmon	5.158	0.076	4.1	4.767	5.548	8.5 km	–	catalog · MPC · JPL
(299572) 2006 EZ_{30}	3 March 2006	Spacewatch	Kitt Peak	5.318	0.080	17.9	4.890	5.745	16 km	–	catalog · MPC · JPL
(299575) 2006 EE_{58}	5 March 2006	Spacewatch	Kitt Peak	5.259	0.027	8.6	5.115	5.403	11 km	–	catalog · MPC · JPL

back to top
