= Mount Nyukasa =

Mountain in the country of Japan

- 入笠山
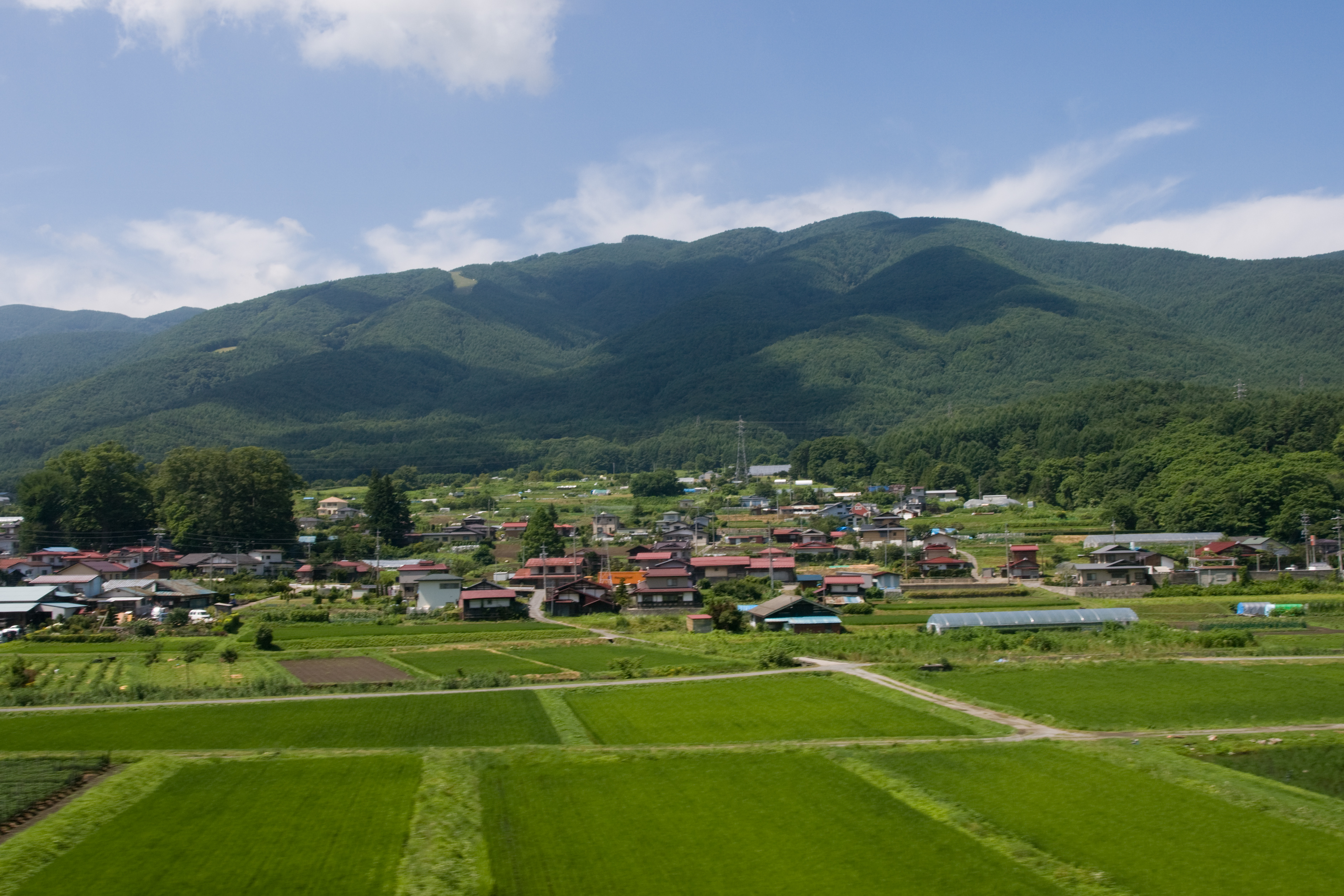
- Mount Nyukasa viewed from near the Suzurannosato Station.

Highest point
- Elevation: 1,955 m (6,414 ft)
- Coordinates: 35°53′47″N 138°10′18″E

Geography
- Location: Japan
- Parent range: Akaishi Mountains

Mount Nyukasa (入笠山, Nyūkasa-yama) is a mountain located on the northernmost edge of the Akaishi Mountains (also known as the Southern Alps), in Nagano Prefecture, Japan.

== Outline ==
Though part of the “Southern Alps”, Mount Nyukasa is not included in the Minami Alps National Park. There are multiple mountain climbing trails, and the summit offers a view of Mount Fuji.

The Japan Aerospace Exploration Agency has an observatory near the peak of Mount Nyukasa.
