= List of minor planets: 244001–245000 =

The following is a partial list of minor planets, running from minor-planet number 244001 through 245000, inclusive. The primary data for this and other partial lists is based on JPL's "Small-Body Orbital Elements" and data available from the Minor Planet Center. Critical list information is also provided by the MPC, unless otherwise specified from Lowell Observatory. A detailed description of the table's columns and additional sources are given on the main page including a complete list of every page in this series, and a statistical break-up on the dynamical classification of minor planets.

Also see the summary list of all named bodies in numerical and alphabetical order, and the corresponding naming citations for the number range of this particular list. New namings may only be added to this list after official publication, as the preannouncement of names is condemned by the Working Group for Small Bodies Nomenclature of the International Astronomical Union.

| Near-Earth obj. | MBA (inner) | MBA (outer) | Centaur |
| Mars-crosser | MBA (middle) | Jupiter trojan | Trans-Neptunian obj. |
| Unclassified |

== 244001–244100 ==
| Designation | | | Discovery | | | Properties | | Ref |
| Permanent | Provisional | Named after | Date | Site | Discoverer(s) | Category | Diam. | Ref |
|---|---|---|---|---|---|---|---|---|
| 244001 | 2001 SE_{39} | — | September 16, 2001 | Socorro | LINEAR | · | 3.3 km | MPC · JPL |
| 244002 | 2001 SC_{41} | — | September 16, 2001 | Socorro | LINEAR | AEO | 2.3 km | MPC · JPL |
| 244003 | 2001 SC_{45} | — | September 16, 2001 | Socorro | LINEAR | · | 3.7 km | MPC · JPL |
| 244004 | 2001 SV_{52} | — | September 16, 2001 | Socorro | LINEAR | · | 2.4 km | MPC · JPL |
| 244005 | 2001 SH_{59} | — | September 17, 2001 | Socorro | LINEAR | · | 1.1 km | MPC · JPL |
| 244006 | 2001 SB_{66} | — | September 17, 2001 | Socorro | LINEAR | EUP | 5.7 km | MPC · JPL |
| 244007 | 2001 SW_{77} | — | September 19, 2001 | Socorro | LINEAR | · | 800 m | MPC · JPL |
| 244008 | 2001 SE_{89} | — | September 20, 2001 | Socorro | LINEAR | · | 1.4 km | MPC · JPL |
| 244009 | 2001 SQ_{92} | — | September 20, 2001 | Socorro | LINEAR | · | 3.3 km | MPC · JPL |
| 244010 | 2001 SN_{98} | — | September 20, 2001 | Socorro | LINEAR | · | 4.8 km | MPC · JPL |
| 244011 | 2001 SH_{105} | — | September 20, 2001 | Socorro | LINEAR | V | 990 m | MPC · JPL |
| 244012 | 2001 SU_{114} | — | September 20, 2001 | Desert Eagle | W. K. Y. Yeung | (883) | 930 m | MPC · JPL |
| 244013 | 2001 SY_{114} | — | September 20, 2001 | Desert Eagle | W. K. Y. Yeung | · | 4.3 km | MPC · JPL |
| 244014 | 2001 SB_{117} | — | September 16, 2001 | Socorro | LINEAR | · | 4.2 km | MPC · JPL |
| 244015 | 2001 SQ_{119} | — | September 16, 2001 | Socorro | LINEAR | · | 1.9 km | MPC · JPL |
| 244016 | 2001 SD_{121} | — | September 16, 2001 | Socorro | LINEAR | DOR | 3.7 km | MPC · JPL |
| 244017 | 2001 SX_{121} | — | September 16, 2001 | Socorro | LINEAR | · | 3.2 km | MPC · JPL |
| 244018 | 2001 SL_{123} | — | September 16, 2001 | Socorro | LINEAR | · | 4.8 km | MPC · JPL |
| 244019 | 2001 SP_{131} | — | September 16, 2001 | Socorro | LINEAR | · | 2.0 km | MPC · JPL |
| 244020 | 2001 SY_{134} | — | September 16, 2001 | Socorro | LINEAR | · | 3.5 km | MPC · JPL |
| 244021 | 2001 SN_{146} | — | September 16, 2001 | Socorro | LINEAR | · | 5.4 km | MPC · JPL |
| 244022 | 2001 SS_{146} | — | September 16, 2001 | Socorro | LINEAR | · | 2.8 km | MPC · JPL |
| 244023 | 2001 SS_{150} | — | September 17, 2001 | Socorro | LINEAR | · | 1.1 km | MPC · JPL |
| 244024 | 2001 SK_{151} | — | September 17, 2001 | Socorro | LINEAR | · | 970 m | MPC · JPL |
| 244025 | 2001 SV_{162} | — | September 17, 2001 | Socorro | LINEAR | · | 960 m | MPC · JPL |
| 244026 | 2001 SF_{165} | — | September 17, 2001 | Socorro | LINEAR | · | 2.2 km | MPC · JPL |
| 244027 | 2001 SQ_{174} | — | September 16, 2001 | Socorro | LINEAR | V | 750 m | MPC · JPL |
| 244028 | 2001 SC_{180} | — | September 19, 2001 | Socorro | LINEAR | URS | 5.9 km | MPC · JPL |
| 244029 | 2001 SC_{210} | — | September 19, 2001 | Socorro | LINEAR | · | 5.1 km | MPC · JPL |
| 244030 | 2001 SH_{215} | — | September 19, 2001 | Socorro | LINEAR | · | 2.7 km | MPC · JPL |
| 244031 | 2001 SX_{216} | — | September 19, 2001 | Socorro | LINEAR | TRE | 3.2 km | MPC · JPL |
| 244032 | 2001 SW_{218} | — | September 19, 2001 | Socorro | LINEAR | · | 920 m | MPC · JPL |
| 244033 | 2001 SG_{237} | — | September 19, 2001 | Socorro | LINEAR | · | 1.4 km | MPC · JPL |
| 244034 | 2001 SN_{238} | — | September 19, 2001 | Socorro | LINEAR | NYS | 1.5 km | MPC · JPL |
| 244035 | 2001 SZ_{240} | — | September 19, 2001 | Socorro | LINEAR | MAS | 860 m | MPC · JPL |
| 244036 | 2001 SW_{242} | — | September 19, 2001 | Socorro | LINEAR | · | 3.0 km | MPC · JPL |
| 244037 | 2001 SG_{258} | — | September 20, 2001 | Socorro | LINEAR | · | 4.0 km | MPC · JPL |
| 244038 | 2001 SU_{275} | — | September 21, 2001 | Kitt Peak | Spacewatch | · | 1.8 km | MPC · JPL |
| 244039 | 2001 ST_{288} | — | September 28, 2001 | Palomar | NEAT | · | 1.6 km | MPC · JPL |
| 244040 | 2001 SL_{298} | — | September 20, 2001 | Socorro | LINEAR | EMA | 5.3 km | MPC · JPL |
| 244041 | 2001 SD_{328} | — | September 18, 2001 | Anderson Mesa | LONEOS | · | 4.0 km | MPC · JPL |
| 244042 | 2001 SQ_{333} | — | September 19, 2001 | Socorro | LINEAR | EOS | 2.8 km | MPC · JPL |
| 244043 | 2001 SZ_{335} | — | September 20, 2001 | Kitt Peak | Spacewatch | · | 3.6 km | MPC · JPL |
| 244044 | 2001 SV_{344} | — | September 23, 2001 | Palomar | NEAT | AEG | 3.9 km | MPC · JPL |
| 244045 | 2001 SH_{348} | — | September 26, 2001 | Socorro | LINEAR | · | 4.0 km | MPC · JPL |
| 244046 | 2001 SU_{354} | — | September 29, 2001 | Palomar | NEAT | EOS | 3.1 km | MPC · JPL |
| 244047 | 2001 TK_{6} | — | October 10, 2001 | Palomar | NEAT | EOS | 2.7 km | MPC · JPL |
| 244048 | 2001 TB_{9} | — | October 9, 2001 | Socorro | LINEAR | · | 1.3 km | MPC · JPL |
| 244049 | 2001 TL_{13} | — | October 14, 2001 | Socorro | LINEAR | · | 1.0 km | MPC · JPL |
| 244050 | 2001 TV_{25} | — | October 14, 2001 | Socorro | LINEAR | · | 1.2 km | MPC · JPL |
| 244051 | 2001 TJ_{26} | — | October 14, 2001 | Socorro | LINEAR | · | 3.6 km | MPC · JPL |
| 244052 | 2001 TX_{29} | — | October 14, 2001 | Socorro | LINEAR | · | 3.4 km | MPC · JPL |
| 244053 | 2001 TJ_{47} | — | October 14, 2001 | Cima Ekar | ADAS | · | 1.6 km | MPC · JPL |
| 244054 | 2001 TM_{68} | — | October 13, 2001 | Socorro | LINEAR | · | 2.3 km | MPC · JPL |
| 244055 | 2001 TR_{77} | — | October 13, 2001 | Socorro | LINEAR | · | 4.3 km | MPC · JPL |
| 244056 | 2001 TT_{77} | — | October 13, 2001 | Socorro | LINEAR | · | 4.2 km | MPC · JPL |
| 244057 | 2001 TV_{80} | — | October 14, 2001 | Socorro | LINEAR | · | 1.1 km | MPC · JPL |
| 244058 | 2001 TV_{83} | — | October 14, 2001 | Socorro | LINEAR | · | 1 km | MPC · JPL |
| 244059 | 2001 TN_{88} | — | October 14, 2001 | Socorro | LINEAR | · | 3.6 km | MPC · JPL |
| 244060 | 2001 TJ_{90} | — | October 14, 2001 | Socorro | LINEAR | · | 5.5 km | MPC · JPL |
| 244061 | 2001 TW_{92} | — | October 14, 2001 | Socorro | LINEAR | EOS | 2.5 km | MPC · JPL |
| 244062 | 2001 TB_{109} | — | October 14, 2001 | Socorro | LINEAR | · | 1.9 km | MPC · JPL |
| 244063 | 2001 TJ_{110} | — | October 14, 2001 | Socorro | LINEAR | · | 4.5 km | MPC · JPL |
| 244064 | 2001 TW_{117} | — | October 15, 2001 | Socorro | LINEAR | · | 1.7 km | MPC · JPL |
| 244065 | 2001 TZ_{118} | — | October 15, 2001 | Socorro | LINEAR | · | 8.3 km | MPC · JPL |
| 244066 | 2001 TR_{129} | — | October 15, 2001 | Kitt Peak | Spacewatch | TRE | 3.1 km | MPC · JPL |
| 244067 | 2001 TD_{130} | — | October 15, 2001 | Kitt Peak | Spacewatch | EOS | 2.4 km | MPC · JPL |
| 244068 | 2001 TM_{134} | — | October 13, 2001 | Palomar | NEAT | · | 2.2 km | MPC · JPL |
| 244069 | 2001 TZ_{148} | — | October 10, 2001 | Palomar | NEAT | · | 1.7 km | MPC · JPL |
| 244070 | 2001 TK_{158} | — | October 11, 2001 | Palomar | NEAT | T_{j} (2.98) | 6.8 km | MPC · JPL |
| 244071 | 2001 TT_{168} | — | October 15, 2001 | Socorro | LINEAR | PHO | 1.3 km | MPC · JPL |
| 244072 | 2001 TM_{179} | — | October 14, 2001 | Socorro | LINEAR | · | 930 m | MPC · JPL |
| 244073 | 2001 TN_{180} | — | October 14, 2001 | Socorro | LINEAR | EOS | 2.8 km | MPC · JPL |
| 244074 | 2001 TC_{183} | — | October 14, 2001 | Socorro | LINEAR | · | 5.0 km | MPC · JPL |
| 244075 | 2001 TQ_{200} | — | October 11, 2001 | Socorro | LINEAR | EOS | 3.1 km | MPC · JPL |
| 244076 | 2001 TK_{210} | — | October 13, 2001 | Anderson Mesa | LONEOS | · | 2.0 km | MPC · JPL |
| 244077 | 2001 TM_{216} | — | October 13, 2001 | Palomar | NEAT | · | 3.1 km | MPC · JPL |
| 244078 | 2001 TE_{231} | — | October 15, 2001 | Palomar | NEAT | · | 2.4 km | MPC · JPL |
| 244079 | 2001 TU_{237} | — | October 10, 2001 | Palomar | NEAT | · | 3.4 km | MPC · JPL |
| 244080 | 2001 TO_{238} | — | October 15, 2001 | Palomar | NEAT | · | 1.0 km | MPC · JPL |
| 244081 | 2001 UY_{5} | — | October 21, 2001 | Desert Eagle | W. K. Y. Yeung | · | 6.2 km | MPC · JPL |
| 244082 | 2001 UD_{21} | — | October 17, 2001 | Socorro | LINEAR | · | 2.0 km | MPC · JPL |
| 244083 | 2001 UD_{22} | — | October 17, 2001 | Socorro | LINEAR | · | 1.8 km | MPC · JPL |
| 244084 | 2001 UG_{33} | — | October 16, 2001 | Socorro | LINEAR | PHO | 1.1 km | MPC · JPL |
| 244085 | 2001 UE_{47} | — | October 17, 2001 | Socorro | LINEAR | · | 7.7 km | MPC · JPL |
| 244086 | 2001 UO_{50} | — | October 17, 2001 | Socorro | LINEAR | · | 4.2 km | MPC · JPL |
| 244087 | 2001 UH_{52} | — | October 17, 2001 | Socorro | LINEAR | · | 950 m | MPC · JPL |
| 244088 | 2001 UJ_{54} | — | October 18, 2001 | Socorro | LINEAR | · | 2.6 km | MPC · JPL |
| 244089 | 2001 UT_{63} | — | October 18, 2001 | Socorro | LINEAR | · | 4.0 km | MPC · JPL |
| 244090 | 2001 UC_{68} | — | October 20, 2001 | Socorro | LINEAR | EOS | 2.7 km | MPC · JPL |
| 244091 | 2001 UM_{77} | — | October 17, 2001 | Socorro | LINEAR | · | 2.5 km | MPC · JPL |
| 244092 | 2001 UV_{78} | — | October 20, 2001 | Socorro | LINEAR | EOS | 2.2 km | MPC · JPL |
| 244093 | 2001 UM_{82} | — | October 20, 2001 | Socorro | LINEAR | · | 6.2 km | MPC · JPL |
| 244094 | 2001 UK_{97} | — | October 17, 2001 | Socorro | LINEAR | V | 950 m | MPC · JPL |
| 244095 | 2001 UZ_{100} | — | October 20, 2001 | Socorro | LINEAR | · | 2.6 km | MPC · JPL |
| 244096 | 2001 US_{118} | — | October 22, 2001 | Socorro | LINEAR | · | 4.1 km | MPC · JPL |
| 244097 | 2001 UN_{121} | — | October 22, 2001 | Socorro | LINEAR | SUL | 3.4 km | MPC · JPL |
| 244098 | 2001 UE_{141} | — | October 23, 2001 | Socorro | LINEAR | · | 1.0 km | MPC · JPL |
| 244099 | 2001 UE_{143} | — | October 23, 2001 | Socorro | LINEAR | HOF | 3.9 km | MPC · JPL |
| 244100 | 2001 UW_{146} | — | October 23, 2001 | Socorro | LINEAR | · | 3.6 km | MPC · JPL |

== 244101–244200 ==
back to top

| Designation | | | Discovery | | | Properties | | Ref |
| Permanent | Provisional | Named after | Date | Site | Discoverer(s) | Category | Diam. | Ref |
|---|---|---|---|---|---|---|---|---|
| 244101 | 2001 UN_{147} | — | October 23, 2001 | Socorro | LINEAR | HOF | 4.7 km | MPC · JPL |
| 244102 | 2001 UN_{150} | — | October 23, 2001 | Socorro | LINEAR | · | 4.5 km | MPC · JPL |
| 244103 | 2001 UV_{171} | — | October 24, 2001 | Socorro | LINEAR | · | 1.1 km | MPC · JPL |
| 244104 | 2001 UP_{184} | — | October 16, 2001 | Kitt Peak | Spacewatch | · | 4.3 km | MPC · JPL |
| 244105 | 2001 UW_{186} | — | October 17, 2001 | Socorro | LINEAR | · | 3.4 km | MPC · JPL |
| 244106 | 2001 UL_{189} | — | October 18, 2001 | Socorro | LINEAR | · | 3.9 km | MPC · JPL |
| 244107 | 2001 UD_{195} | — | October 18, 2001 | Palomar | NEAT | · | 4.3 km | MPC · JPL |
| 244108 | 2001 UW_{204} | — | October 19, 2001 | Palomar | NEAT | VER | 5.0 km | MPC · JPL |
| 244109 | 2001 UX_{213} | — | October 23, 2001 | Socorro | LINEAR | · | 4.2 km | MPC · JPL |
| 244110 | 2001 UC_{220} | — | October 20, 2001 | Socorro | LINEAR | · | 3.9 km | MPC · JPL |
| 244111 | 2001 UV_{225} | — | October 16, 2001 | Palomar | NEAT | EOS | 2.1 km | MPC · JPL |
| 244112 | 2001 UH_{227} | — | October 16, 2001 | Palomar | NEAT | · | 2.0 km | MPC · JPL |
| 244113 | 2001 VU_{3} | — | November 11, 2001 | Kitt Peak | Spacewatch | · | 3.7 km | MPC · JPL |
| 244114 | 2001 VX_{3} | — | November 11, 2001 | Kitt Peak | Spacewatch | (13314) | 2.8 km | MPC · JPL |
| 244115 | 2001 VG_{4} | — | November 11, 2001 | Socorro | LINEAR | · | 1.9 km | MPC · JPL |
| 244116 | 2001 VE_{7} | — | November 9, 2001 | Socorro | LINEAR | · | 4.6 km | MPC · JPL |
| 244117 | 2001 VU_{10} | — | November 10, 2001 | Socorro | LINEAR | · | 4.4 km | MPC · JPL |
| 244118 | 2001 VU_{13} | — | November 10, 2001 | Socorro | LINEAR | · | 6.5 km | MPC · JPL |
| 244119 | 2001 VH_{16} | — | November 10, 2001 | Palomar | NEAT | · | 4.7 km | MPC · JPL |
| 244120 | 2001 VP_{23} | — | November 9, 2001 | Socorro | LINEAR | · | 1.6 km | MPC · JPL |
| 244121 | 2001 VX_{35} | — | November 9, 2001 | Socorro | LINEAR | · | 1.1 km | MPC · JPL |
| 244122 | 2001 VV_{40} | — | November 9, 2001 | Socorro | LINEAR | · | 3.5 km | MPC · JPL |
| 244123 | 2001 VE_{41} | — | November 9, 2001 | Socorro | LINEAR | URS | 5.6 km | MPC · JPL |
| 244124 | 2001 VV_{42} | — | November 9, 2001 | Socorro | LINEAR | · | 4.5 km | MPC · JPL |
| 244125 | 2001 VG_{43} | — | November 9, 2001 | Socorro | LINEAR | · | 3.2 km | MPC · JPL |
| 244126 | 2001 VK_{44} | — | November 9, 2001 | Socorro | LINEAR | · | 2.6 km | MPC · JPL |
| 244127 | 2001 VA_{46} | — | November 9, 2001 | Socorro | LINEAR | · | 1.4 km | MPC · JPL |
| 244128 | 2001 VQ_{57} | — | November 10, 2001 | Socorro | LINEAR | · | 1.2 km | MPC · JPL |
| 244129 | 2001 VE_{58} | — | November 10, 2001 | Socorro | LINEAR | DOR | 4.5 km | MPC · JPL |
| 244130 | 2001 VJ_{62} | — | November 10, 2001 | Socorro | LINEAR | EOS | 3.0 km | MPC · JPL |
| 244131 | 2001 VO_{62} | — | November 10, 2001 | Socorro | LINEAR | · | 2.3 km | MPC · JPL |
| 244132 | 2001 VN_{65} | — | November 10, 2001 | Socorro | LINEAR | · | 2.8 km | MPC · JPL |
| 244133 | 2001 VF_{82} | — | November 10, 2001 | Socorro | LINEAR | · | 8.4 km | MPC · JPL |
| 244134 | 2001 VE_{100} | — | November 12, 2001 | Socorro | LINEAR | PHO | 3.1 km | MPC · JPL |
| 244135 | 2001 VP_{102} | — | November 12, 2001 | Socorro | LINEAR | · | 4.2 km | MPC · JPL |
| 244136 | 2001 VW_{103} | — | November 12, 2001 | Socorro | LINEAR | · | 2.1 km | MPC · JPL |
| 244137 | 2001 VW_{118} | — | November 12, 2001 | Socorro | LINEAR | EOS | 2.7 km | MPC · JPL |
| 244138 | 2001 VR_{124} | — | November 9, 2001 | Socorro | LINEAR | NYS | 1.9 km | MPC · JPL |
| 244139 | 2001 VT_{124} | — | November 9, 2001 | Socorro | LINEAR | · | 3.2 km | MPC · JPL |
| 244140 | 2001 VZ_{132} | — | November 12, 2001 | Socorro | LINEAR | · | 4.4 km | MPC · JPL |
| 244141 | 2001 WV | — | November 16, 2001 | Kitt Peak | Spacewatch | EOS | 3.4 km | MPC · JPL |
| 244142 | 2001 WY | — | November 16, 2001 | Kitt Peak | Spacewatch | · | 1.3 km | MPC · JPL |
| 244143 | 2001 WH_{5} | — | November 21, 2001 | Socorro | LINEAR | · | 770 m | MPC · JPL |
| 244144 | 2001 WG_{15} | — | November 17, 2001 | Anderson Mesa | LONEOS | H | 870 m | MPC · JPL |
| 244145 | 2001 WU_{18} | — | November 17, 2001 | Socorro | LINEAR | · | 5.0 km | MPC · JPL |
| 244146 | 2001 WD_{24} | — | November 17, 2001 | Kitt Peak | Spacewatch | · | 970 m | MPC · JPL |
| 244147 | 2001 WX_{24} | — | November 18, 2001 | Kitt Peak | Spacewatch | · | 2.2 km | MPC · JPL |
| 244148 | 2001 WQ_{32} | — | November 17, 2001 | Socorro | LINEAR | · | 4.0 km | MPC · JPL |
| 244149 | 2001 WH_{33} | — | November 17, 2001 | Socorro | LINEAR | · | 2.6 km | MPC · JPL |
| 244150 | 2001 WW_{38} | — | November 17, 2001 | Socorro | LINEAR | PHO | 2.2 km | MPC · JPL |
| 244151 | 2001 WZ_{44} | — | November 18, 2001 | Socorro | LINEAR | ARM | 5.5 km | MPC · JPL |
| 244152 | 2001 WG_{56} | — | November 19, 2001 | Socorro | LINEAR | NYS | 1.5 km | MPC · JPL |
| 244153 | 2001 WN_{58} | — | November 19, 2001 | Socorro | LINEAR | · | 3.2 km | MPC · JPL |
| 244154 | 2001 WH_{61} | — | November 19, 2001 | Socorro | LINEAR | · | 5.3 km | MPC · JPL |
| 244155 | 2001 WJ_{65} | — | November 20, 2001 | Socorro | LINEAR | · | 4.6 km | MPC · JPL |
| 244156 | 2001 WR_{82} | — | November 20, 2001 | Socorro | LINEAR | HYG | 4.1 km | MPC · JPL |
| 244157 | 2001 WR_{90} | — | November 21, 2001 | Socorro | LINEAR | · | 2.5 km | MPC · JPL |
| 244158 | 2001 WE_{101} | — | November 17, 2001 | Kitt Peak | Spacewatch | · | 890 m | MPC · JPL |
| 244159 | 2001 WN_{103} | — | November 19, 2001 | Anderson Mesa | LONEOS | VER | 3.8 km | MPC · JPL |
| 244160 | 2001 XC_{8} | — | December 8, 2001 | Socorro | LINEAR | PHO | 2.6 km | MPC · JPL |
| 244161 | 2001 XK_{8} | — | December 9, 2001 | Socorro | LINEAR | URS | 6.3 km | MPC · JPL |
| 244162 | 2001 XQ_{15} | — | December 10, 2001 | Socorro | LINEAR | · | 1.2 km | MPC · JPL |
| 244163 | 2001 XX_{15} | — | December 10, 2001 | Socorro | LINEAR | · | 1.9 km | MPC · JPL |
| 244164 | 2001 XV_{29} | — | December 11, 2001 | Socorro | LINEAR | · | 1.5 km | MPC · JPL |
| 244165 | 2001 XR_{44} | — | December 9, 2001 | Socorro | LINEAR | · | 1.2 km | MPC · JPL |
| 244166 | 2001 XA_{47} | — | December 9, 2001 | Socorro | LINEAR | · | 5.8 km | MPC · JPL |
| 244167 | 2001 XE_{61} | — | December 10, 2001 | Socorro | LINEAR | · | 1.6 km | MPC · JPL |
| 244168 | 2001 XS_{78} | — | December 11, 2001 | Socorro | LINEAR | · | 2.9 km | MPC · JPL |
| 244169 | 2001 XK_{81} | — | December 11, 2001 | Socorro | LINEAR | · | 1.5 km | MPC · JPL |
| 244170 | 2001 XV_{84} | — | December 11, 2001 | Socorro | LINEAR | · | 1.3 km | MPC · JPL |
| 244171 | 2001 XA_{89} | — | December 10, 2001 | Socorro | LINEAR | · | 4.8 km | MPC · JPL |
| 244172 | 2001 XS_{90} | — | December 10, 2001 | Socorro | LINEAR | NYS | 1.6 km | MPC · JPL |
| 244173 | 2001 XZ_{90} | — | December 10, 2001 | Socorro | LINEAR | · | 4.5 km | MPC · JPL |
| 244174 | 2001 XH_{120} | — | December 14, 2001 | Socorro | LINEAR | · | 1.6 km | MPC · JPL |
| 244175 | 2001 XK_{125} | — | December 14, 2001 | Socorro | LINEAR | NYS | 990 m | MPC · JPL |
| 244176 | 2001 XJ_{127} | — | December 14, 2001 | Socorro | LINEAR | · | 930 m | MPC · JPL |
| 244177 | 2001 XA_{134} | — | December 14, 2001 | Socorro | LINEAR | (13314) | 3.1 km | MPC · JPL |
| 244178 | 2001 XX_{139} | — | December 14, 2001 | Socorro | LINEAR | · | 1.5 km | MPC · JPL |
| 244179 | 2001 XF_{150} | — | December 14, 2001 | Socorro | LINEAR | MAS | 970 m | MPC · JPL |
| 244180 | 2001 XC_{151} | — | December 14, 2001 | Socorro | LINEAR | ERI | 2.3 km | MPC · JPL |
| 244181 | 2001 XE_{180} | — | December 14, 2001 | Socorro | LINEAR | · | 6.7 km | MPC · JPL |
| 244182 | 2001 XS_{202} | — | December 11, 2001 | Socorro | LINEAR | · | 1.2 km | MPC · JPL |
| 244183 | 2001 XQ_{203} | — | December 11, 2001 | Socorro | LINEAR | LUT | 6.3 km | MPC · JPL |
| 244184 | 2001 XR_{205} | — | December 11, 2001 | Socorro | LINEAR | · | 4.2 km | MPC · JPL |
| 244185 | 2001 XG_{206} | — | December 11, 2001 | Socorro | LINEAR | · | 8.1 km | MPC · JPL |
| 244186 | 2001 XV_{215} | — | December 14, 2001 | Socorro | LINEAR | · | 1.1 km | MPC · JPL |
| 244187 | 2001 XP_{244} | — | December 15, 2001 | Socorro | LINEAR | V | 780 m | MPC · JPL |
| 244188 | 2001 XS_{244} | — | December 15, 2001 | Socorro | LINEAR | HOF | 3.2 km | MPC · JPL |
| 244189 | 2001 XS_{247} | — | December 15, 2001 | Socorro | LINEAR | · | 2.2 km | MPC · JPL |
| 244190 | 2001 XP_{267} | — | December 15, 2001 | Apache Point | SDSS | · | 3.3 km | MPC · JPL |
| 244191 | 2001 YG_{13} | — | December 17, 2001 | Socorro | LINEAR | · | 4.3 km | MPC · JPL |
| 244192 | 2001 YR_{22} | — | December 18, 2001 | Socorro | LINEAR | · | 1.5 km | MPC · JPL |
| 244193 | 2001 YJ_{24} | — | December 18, 2001 | Socorro | LINEAR | · | 1.2 km | MPC · JPL |
| 244194 | 2001 YW_{34} | — | December 18, 2001 | Socorro | LINEAR | · | 4.7 km | MPC · JPL |
| 244195 | 2001 YP_{35} | — | December 18, 2001 | Socorro | LINEAR | · | 4.5 km | MPC · JPL |
| 244196 | 2001 YQ_{40} | — | December 18, 2001 | Socorro | LINEAR | · | 1.3 km | MPC · JPL |
| 244197 | 2001 YC_{44} | — | December 18, 2001 | Socorro | LINEAR | · | 4.2 km | MPC · JPL |
| 244198 | 2001 YP_{85} | — | December 18, 2001 | Socorro | LINEAR | · | 1.4 km | MPC · JPL |
| 244199 | 2001 YE_{89} | — | December 18, 2001 | Socorro | LINEAR | · | 2.4 km | MPC · JPL |
| 244200 | 2001 YU_{99} | — | December 17, 2001 | Socorro | LINEAR | CYB | 4.9 km | MPC · JPL |

== 244201–244300 ==
back to top

| Designation | | | Discovery | | | Properties | | Ref |
| Permanent | Provisional | Named after | Date | Site | Discoverer(s) | Category | Diam. | Ref |
|---|---|---|---|---|---|---|---|---|
| 244201 | 2001 YL_{102} | — | December 17, 2001 | Socorro | LINEAR | · | 1.6 km | MPC · JPL |
| 244202 | 2001 YV_{120} | — | December 18, 2001 | Kitt Peak | Spacewatch | · | 2.1 km | MPC · JPL |
| 244203 | 2001 YJ_{130} | — | December 17, 2001 | Socorro | LINEAR | EUN | 2.1 km | MPC · JPL |
| 244204 | 2001 YH_{141} | — | December 17, 2001 | Kitt Peak | Spacewatch | · | 1.1 km | MPC · JPL |
| 244205 | 2001 YL_{144} | — | December 17, 2001 | Socorro | LINEAR | V | 980 m | MPC · JPL |
| 244206 | 2001 YB_{160} | — | December 18, 2001 | Apache Point | SDSS | · | 2.2 km | MPC · JPL |
| 244207 | 2002 AW_{7} | — | January 6, 2002 | Kitt Peak | Spacewatch | slow | 3.0 km | MPC · JPL |
| 244208 | 2002 AY_{7} | — | January 6, 2002 | Kitt Peak | Spacewatch | NYS | 990 m | MPC · JPL |
| 244209 | 2002 AO_{15} | — | January 7, 2002 | Socorro | LINEAR | EUN | 1.7 km | MPC · JPL |
| 244210 | 2002 AW_{22} | — | January 5, 2002 | Palomar | NEAT | ERI | 1.7 km | MPC · JPL |
| 244211 | 2002 AV_{24} | — | January 8, 2002 | Palomar | NEAT | · | 1.9 km | MPC · JPL |
| 244212 | 2002 AV_{44} | — | January 9, 2002 | Socorro | LINEAR | NYS | 1.4 km | MPC · JPL |
| 244213 | 2002 AP_{46} | — | January 9, 2002 | Socorro | LINEAR | · | 1.6 km | MPC · JPL |
| 244214 | 2002 AW_{49} | — | January 9, 2002 | Socorro | LINEAR | ERI | 2.0 km | MPC · JPL |
| 244215 | 2002 AC_{50} | — | January 9, 2002 | Socorro | LINEAR | (2076) | 1.6 km | MPC · JPL |
| 244216 | 2002 AH_{76} | — | January 8, 2002 | Socorro | LINEAR | · | 1.3 km | MPC · JPL |
| 244217 | 2002 AS_{79} | — | January 8, 2002 | Socorro | LINEAR | NYS | 1.3 km | MPC · JPL |
| 244218 | 2002 AA_{93} | — | January 14, 2002 | Cerro Tololo | Deep Lens Survey | · | 1.4 km | MPC · JPL |
| 244219 | 2002 AV_{106} | — | January 9, 2002 | Socorro | LINEAR | · | 1.3 km | MPC · JPL |
| 244220 | 2002 AJ_{144} | — | January 13, 2002 | Socorro | LINEAR | PHO | 2.7 km | MPC · JPL |
| 244221 | 2002 AR_{157} | — | January 13, 2002 | Socorro | LINEAR | · | 1.4 km | MPC · JPL |
| 244222 | 2002 AX_{161} | — | January 13, 2002 | Socorro | LINEAR | V | 1.1 km | MPC · JPL |
| 244223 | 2002 AY_{176} | — | January 14, 2002 | Socorro | LINEAR | · | 5.7 km | MPC · JPL |
| 244224 | 2002 AW_{177} | — | January 14, 2002 | Socorro | LINEAR | V | 930 m | MPC · JPL |
| 244225 | 2002 BJ_{1} | — | January 19, 2002 | Desert Eagle | W. K. Y. Yeung | · | 1.9 km | MPC · JPL |
| 244226 | 2002 BB_{3} | — | January 18, 2002 | Anderson Mesa | LONEOS | · | 1.7 km | MPC · JPL |
| 244227 | 2002 BD_{18} | — | January 21, 2002 | Socorro | LINEAR | · | 4.8 km | MPC · JPL |
| 244228 | 2002 BG_{22} | — | January 21, 2002 | Socorro | LINEAR | V | 1.0 km | MPC · JPL |
| 244229 | 2002 CZ_{15} | — | February 9, 2002 | Desert Eagle | W. K. Y. Yeung | · | 4.5 km | MPC · JPL |
| 244230 | 2002 CO_{20} | — | February 4, 2002 | Haleakala | NEAT | V | 940 m | MPC · JPL |
| 244231 | 2002 CH_{47} | — | February 3, 2002 | Haleakala | NEAT | NYS | 1.5 km | MPC · JPL |
| 244232 | 2002 CX_{60} | — | February 6, 2002 | Socorro | LINEAR | V | 1.1 km | MPC · JPL |
| 244233 | 2002 CU_{68} | — | February 7, 2002 | Socorro | LINEAR | · | 1.3 km | MPC · JPL |
| 244234 | 2002 CP_{69} | — | February 7, 2002 | Socorro | LINEAR | · | 6.3 km | MPC · JPL |
| 244235 | 2002 CX_{69} | — | February 7, 2002 | Socorro | LINEAR | V | 970 m | MPC · JPL |
| 244236 | 2002 CC_{74} | — | February 7, 2002 | Socorro | LINEAR | · | 1.2 km | MPC · JPL |
| 244237 | 2002 CP_{76} | — | February 7, 2002 | Socorro | LINEAR | CLA | 2.6 km | MPC · JPL |
| 244238 | 2002 CK_{77} | — | February 7, 2002 | Socorro | LINEAR | NYS | 1.3 km | MPC · JPL |
| 244239 | 2002 CS_{85} | — | February 7, 2002 | Socorro | LINEAR | · | 2.2 km | MPC · JPL |
| 244240 | 2002 CH_{103} | — | February 7, 2002 | Socorro | LINEAR | · | 4.0 km | MPC · JPL |
| 244241 | 2002 CL_{110} | — | February 7, 2002 | Socorro | LINEAR | · | 1.8 km | MPC · JPL |
| 244242 | 2002 CU_{113} | — | February 8, 2002 | Socorro | LINEAR | · | 1.6 km | MPC · JPL |
| 244243 | 2002 CD_{117} | — | February 14, 2002 | Needville | Needville | · | 1.7 km | MPC · JPL |
| 244244 | 2002 CW_{119} | — | February 7, 2002 | Socorro | LINEAR | SUL | 3.6 km | MPC · JPL |
| 244245 | 2002 CC_{120} | — | February 7, 2002 | Socorro | LINEAR | · | 1.8 km | MPC · JPL |
| 244246 | 2002 CW_{120} | — | February 7, 2002 | Socorro | LINEAR | · | 1.5 km | MPC · JPL |
| 244247 | 2002 CC_{130} | — | February 7, 2002 | Socorro | LINEAR | · | 2.1 km | MPC · JPL |
| 244248 | 2002 CB_{143} | — | February 9, 2002 | Socorro | LINEAR | NYS | 1.3 km | MPC · JPL |
| 244249 | 2002 CQ_{153} | — | February 8, 2002 | Kitt Peak | Spacewatch | · | 3.3 km | MPC · JPL |
| 244250 | 2002 CM_{162} | — | February 8, 2002 | Socorro | LINEAR | · | 5.5 km | MPC · JPL |
| 244251 | 2002 CP_{172} | — | February 8, 2002 | Socorro | LINEAR | EOS · | 4.0 km | MPC · JPL |
| 244252 | 2002 CF_{173} | — | February 8, 2002 | Socorro | LINEAR | · | 1.8 km | MPC · JPL |
| 244253 | 2002 CP_{183} | — | February 10, 2002 | Socorro | LINEAR | · | 4.5 km | MPC · JPL |
| 244254 | 2002 CR_{199} | — | February 10, 2002 | Socorro | LINEAR | MAS | 960 m | MPC · JPL |
| 244255 | 2002 CB_{204} | — | February 10, 2002 | Socorro | LINEAR | MAS | 830 m | MPC · JPL |
| 244256 | 2002 CT_{220} | — | February 10, 2002 | Socorro | LINEAR | · | 1.9 km | MPC · JPL |
| 244257 | 2002 CL_{222} | — | February 11, 2002 | Socorro | LINEAR | · | 810 m | MPC · JPL |
| 244258 | 2002 CD_{226} | — | February 3, 2002 | Haleakala | NEAT | · | 4.0 km | MPC · JPL |
| 244259 | 2002 CD_{242} | — | February 11, 2002 | Socorro | LINEAR | NYS | 1.5 km | MPC · JPL |
| 244260 | 2002 CB_{245} | — | February 13, 2002 | Socorro | LINEAR | EUP | 4.8 km | MPC · JPL |
| 244261 | 2002 CZ_{251} | — | February 3, 2002 | Haleakala | NEAT | · | 3.6 km | MPC · JPL |
| 244262 | 2002 CB_{252} | — | February 3, 2002 | Haleakala | NEAT | PHO | 3.0 km | MPC · JPL |
| 244263 | 2002 CR_{282} | — | February 8, 2002 | Kitt Peak | M. W. Buie | · | 2.4 km | MPC · JPL |
| 244264 | 2002 CE_{283} | — | February 8, 2002 | Kitt Peak | Spacewatch | · | 1.3 km | MPC · JPL |
| 244265 | 2002 CV_{303} | — | February 13, 2002 | Kitt Peak | Spacewatch | · | 1.4 km | MPC · JPL |
| 244266 | 2002 CR_{305} | — | February 3, 2002 | Anderson Mesa | LONEOS | NYS · | 2.2 km | MPC · JPL |
| 244267 | 2002 CC_{306} | — | February 5, 2002 | Anderson Mesa | LONEOS | NYS | 1.4 km | MPC · JPL |
| 244268 | 2002 CP_{310} | — | February 7, 2002 | Palomar | NEAT | V | 990 m | MPC · JPL |
| 244269 | 2002 DN | — | February 16, 2002 | Bohyunsan | Jeon, Y.-B., Lee, B.-C. | · | 4.1 km | MPC · JPL |
| 244270 | 2002 DN_{1} | — | February 18, 2002 | Cima Ekar | ADAS | LUT | 7.2 km | MPC · JPL |
| 244271 | 2002 DJ_{19} | — | February 22, 2002 | Palomar | NEAT | · | 1.2 km | MPC · JPL |
| 244272 | 2002 DF_{20} | — | February 16, 2002 | Palomar | NEAT | · | 1.9 km | MPC · JPL |
| 244273 | 2002 EV_{5} | — | March 11, 2002 | Palomar | NEAT | H | 730 m | MPC · JPL |
| 244274 | 2002 EC_{7} | — | March 6, 2002 | Siding Spring | R. H. McNaught | · | 1.8 km | MPC · JPL |
| 244275 | 2002 EG_{9} | — | March 12, 2002 | Kvistaberg | Uppsala-DLR Asteroid Survey | · | 1.7 km | MPC · JPL |
| 244276 | 2002 EH_{16} | — | March 6, 2002 | Palomar | NEAT | · | 2.7 km | MPC · JPL |
| 244277 | 2002 EL_{19} | — | March 9, 2002 | Palomar | NEAT | · | 1.3 km | MPC · JPL |
| 244278 | 2002 EG_{25} | — | March 10, 2002 | Anderson Mesa | LONEOS | · | 3.6 km | MPC · JPL |
| 244279 | 2002 EU_{27} | — | March 9, 2002 | Socorro | LINEAR | NYS · | 2.8 km | MPC · JPL |
| 244280 | 2002 EJ_{39} | — | March 9, 2002 | Socorro | LINEAR | · | 1.7 km | MPC · JPL |
| 244281 | 2002 EB_{40} | — | March 9, 2002 | Socorro | LINEAR | · | 4.6 km | MPC · JPL |
| 244282 | 2002 ER_{70} | — | March 13, 2002 | Socorro | LINEAR | · | 6.0 km | MPC · JPL |
| 244283 | 2002 EC_{85} | — | March 9, 2002 | Socorro | LINEAR | · | 1.7 km | MPC · JPL |
| 244284 | 2002 EK_{93} | — | March 14, 2002 | Socorro | LINEAR | · | 1.4 km | MPC · JPL |
| 244285 | 2002 EL_{94} | — | March 14, 2002 | Socorro | LINEAR | MAS | 990 m | MPC · JPL |
| 244286 | 2002 EA_{101} | — | March 6, 2002 | Socorro | LINEAR | · | 1.7 km | MPC · JPL |
| 244287 | 2002 EV_{103} | — | March 9, 2002 | Anderson Mesa | LONEOS | · | 3.4 km | MPC · JPL |
| 244288 | 2002 EO_{108} | — | March 9, 2002 | Palomar | NEAT | NYS · | 1.6 km | MPC · JPL |
| 244289 | 2002 EJ_{115} | — | March 10, 2002 | Anderson Mesa | LONEOS | · | 2.1 km | MPC · JPL |
| 244290 | 2002 EZ_{119} | — | March 10, 2002 | Kitt Peak | Spacewatch | · | 5.2 km | MPC · JPL |
| 244291 | 2002 EW_{135} | — | March 12, 2002 | Palomar | NEAT | NYS | 1.6 km | MPC · JPL |
| 244292 | 2002 EZ_{141} | — | March 12, 2002 | Palomar | NEAT | · | 2.4 km | MPC · JPL |
| 244293 | 2002 EG_{145} | — | March 13, 2002 | Palomar | NEAT | NYS | 1.4 km | MPC · JPL |
| 244294 | 2002 EK_{148} | — | March 15, 2002 | Palomar | NEAT | EOS | 3.8 km | MPC · JPL |
| 244295 | 2002 ES_{151} | — | March 15, 2002 | Socorro | LINEAR | MAR | 1.3 km | MPC · JPL |
| 244296 | 2002 EZ_{157} | — | March 6, 2002 | Palomar | NEAT | · | 2.3 km | MPC · JPL |
| 244297 | 2002 FD_{4} | — | March 20, 2002 | Desert Eagle | W. K. Y. Yeung | · | 1.5 km | MPC · JPL |
| 244298 | 2002 FY_{5} | — | March 22, 2002 | Eskridge | Farpoint | · | 1.6 km | MPC · JPL |
| 244299 | 2002 FU_{25} | — | March 19, 2002 | Palomar | NEAT | PHO | 2.8 km | MPC · JPL |
| 244300 | 2002 FW_{25} | — | March 19, 2002 | Palomar | NEAT | · | 1.9 km | MPC · JPL |

== 244301–244400 ==
back to top

| Designation | | | Discovery | | | Properties | | Ref |
| Permanent | Provisional | Named after | Date | Site | Discoverer(s) | Category | Diam. | Ref |
|---|---|---|---|---|---|---|---|---|
| 244301 | 2002 FJ_{35} | — | March 21, 2002 | Anderson Mesa | LONEOS | · | 1.7 km | MPC · JPL |
| 244302 | 2002 GM_{4} | — | April 9, 2002 | Socorro | LINEAR | H | 670 m | MPC · JPL |
| 244303 | 2002 GT_{8} | — | April 9, 2002 | Palomar | NEAT | · | 3.5 km | MPC · JPL |
| 244304 | 2002 GE_{69} | — | April 8, 2002 | Palomar | NEAT | · | 2.5 km | MPC · JPL |
| 244305 | 2002 GY_{78} | — | April 10, 2002 | Palomar | NEAT | PHO | 2.1 km | MPC · JPL |
| 244306 | 2002 GM_{88} | — | April 10, 2002 | Socorro | LINEAR | · | 4.0 km | MPC · JPL |
| 244307 | 2002 GL_{90} | — | April 8, 2002 | Kitt Peak | Spacewatch | · | 4.5 km | MPC · JPL |
| 244308 | 2002 GG_{92} | — | April 9, 2002 | Kitt Peak | Spacewatch | · | 980 m | MPC · JPL |
| 244309 | 2002 GQ_{93} | — | April 9, 2002 | Socorro | LINEAR | · | 3.6 km | MPC · JPL |
| 244310 | 2002 GD_{105} | — | April 11, 2002 | Anderson Mesa | LONEOS | · | 1.6 km | MPC · JPL |
| 244311 | 2002 GE_{107} | — | April 11, 2002 | Socorro | LINEAR | · | 4.8 km | MPC · JPL |
| 244312 | 2002 GG_{128} | — | April 12, 2002 | Socorro | LINEAR | · | 1.2 km | MPC · JPL |
| 244313 | 2002 GY_{133} | — | April 12, 2002 | Socorro | LINEAR | · | 1.3 km | MPC · JPL |
| 244314 | 2002 GQ_{136} | — | April 12, 2002 | Socorro | LINEAR | · | 7.6 km | MPC · JPL |
| 244315 | 2002 GA_{142} | — | April 13, 2002 | Palomar | NEAT | H | 710 m | MPC · JPL |
| 244316 | 2002 GC_{154} | — | April 12, 2002 | Palomar | NEAT | · | 1.7 km | MPC · JPL |
| 244317 | 2002 GU_{161} | — | April 14, 2002 | Socorro | LINEAR | · | 5.2 km | MPC · JPL |
| 244318 | 2002 GU_{165} | — | April 15, 2002 | Palomar | NEAT | · | 4.3 km | MPC · JPL |
| 244319 | 2002 GO_{172} | — | April 10, 2002 | Socorro | LINEAR | · | 1.8 km | MPC · JPL |
| 244320 | 2002 GF_{177} | — | April 7, 2002 | Cerro Tololo | M. W. Buie | MAS | 760 m | MPC · JPL |
| 244321 | 2002 GR_{181} | — | April 5, 2002 | Kitt Peak | Spacewatch | · | 1.4 km | MPC · JPL |
| 244322 | 2002 GZ_{188} | — | April 9, 2002 | Palomar | NEAT | · | 2.2 km | MPC · JPL |
| 244323 | 2002 HU_{10} | — | April 22, 2002 | Palomar | NEAT | EUP | 6.4 km | MPC · JPL |
| 244324 | 2002 HT_{13} | — | April 21, 2002 | Socorro | LINEAR | H | 740 m | MPC · JPL |
| 244325 | 2002 HB_{15} | — | April 17, 2002 | Socorro | LINEAR | MAS | 990 m | MPC · JPL |
| 244326 | 2002 HN_{16} | — | April 18, 2002 | Socorro | LINEAR | EUN | 1.8 km | MPC · JPL |
| 244327 | 2002 HD_{17} | — | April 19, 2002 | Kitt Peak | Spacewatch | · | 2.9 km | MPC · JPL |
| 244328 | 2002 JL_{5} | — | May 5, 2002 | Prescott | P. G. Comba | · | 1.7 km | MPC · JPL |
| 244329 | 2002 JY_{9} | — | May 6, 2002 | Socorro | LINEAR | H | 740 m | MPC · JPL |
| 244330 | 2002 JW_{11} | — | May 6, 2002 | Anderson Mesa | LONEOS | · | 2.6 km | MPC · JPL |
| 244331 | 2002 JV_{21} | — | May 9, 2002 | Desert Eagle | W. K. Y. Yeung | · | 3.1 km | MPC · JPL |
| 244332 | 2002 JH_{43} | — | May 9, 2002 | Socorro | LINEAR | · | 2.9 km | MPC · JPL |
| 244333 | 2002 JV_{52} | — | May 9, 2002 | Socorro | LINEAR | ERI | 2.3 km | MPC · JPL |
| 244334 | 2002 JE_{53} | — | May 9, 2002 | Socorro | LINEAR | LUT | 5.4 km | MPC · JPL |
| 244335 | 2002 JX_{62} | — | May 8, 2002 | Socorro | LINEAR | · | 1.4 km | MPC · JPL |
| 244336 | 2002 JJ_{86} | — | May 11, 2002 | Socorro | LINEAR | · | 5.1 km | MPC · JPL |
| 244337 | 2002 JR_{86} | — | May 11, 2002 | Socorro | LINEAR | PHO | 1.2 km | MPC · JPL |
| 244338 | 2002 JZ_{87} | — | May 11, 2002 | Socorro | LINEAR | · | 2.0 km | MPC · JPL |
| 244339 | 2002 JH_{104} | — | May 10, 2002 | Socorro | LINEAR | · | 1.5 km | MPC · JPL |
| 244340 | 2002 JR_{107} | — | May 14, 2002 | Palomar | NEAT | BAR | 2.4 km | MPC · JPL |
| 244341 | 2002 JW_{109} | — | May 11, 2002 | Socorro | LINEAR | · | 1.6 km | MPC · JPL |
| 244342 | 2002 JG_{114} | — | May 6, 2002 | Socorro | LINEAR | PHO | 2.1 km | MPC · JPL |
| 244343 | 2002 JM_{120} | — | May 5, 2002 | Palomar | NEAT | · | 2.0 km | MPC · JPL |
| 244344 | 2002 KY_{15} | — | May 18, 2002 | Palomar | NEAT | · | 2.2 km | MPC · JPL |
| 244345 | 2002 KJ_{16} | — | May 16, 2002 | Palomar | NEAT | · | 2.0 km | MPC · JPL |
| 244346 | 2002 LP | — | June 2, 2002 | Palomar | NEAT | · | 2.8 km | MPC · JPL |
| 244347 | 2002 LT_{7} | — | June 3, 2002 | Socorro | LINEAR | H | 750 m | MPC · JPL |
| 244348 | 2002 LB_{27} | — | June 7, 2002 | Socorro | LINEAR | · | 4.0 km | MPC · JPL |
| 244349 | 2002 LF_{30} | — | June 8, 2002 | Kitt Peak | Spacewatch | PHO | 1.9 km | MPC · JPL |
| 244350 | 2002 LF_{43} | — | June 10, 2002 | Socorro | LINEAR | · | 1.4 km | MPC · JPL |
| 244351 | 2002 LO_{43} | — | June 10, 2002 | Socorro | LINEAR | · | 4.2 km | MPC · JPL |
| 244352 | 2002 LJ_{53} | — | June 8, 2002 | Socorro | LINEAR | · | 3.8 km | MPC · JPL |
| 244353 | 2002 LG_{61} | — | June 2, 2002 | Palomar | NEAT | V | 850 m | MPC · JPL |
| 244354 | 2002 LA_{63} | — | June 13, 2002 | Palomar | NEAT | · | 2.9 km | MPC · JPL |
| 244355 | 2002 MH | — | June 17, 2002 | Campo Imperatore | CINEOS | · | 1.4 km | MPC · JPL |
| 244356 | 2002 NC_{7} | — | July 9, 2002 | Palomar | NEAT | · | 2.9 km | MPC · JPL |
| 244357 | 2002 NF_{7} | — | July 9, 2002 | Palomar | NEAT | · | 3.0 km | MPC · JPL |
| 244358 | 2002 NJ_{15} | — | July 5, 2002 | Socorro | LINEAR | · | 1.6 km | MPC · JPL |
| 244359 | 2002 NT_{18} | — | July 9, 2002 | Socorro | LINEAR | · | 2.0 km | MPC · JPL |
| 244360 | 2002 NK_{27} | — | July 9, 2002 | Socorro | LINEAR | · | 6.4 km | MPC · JPL |
| 244361 | 2002 NN_{32} | — | July 13, 2002 | Socorro | LINEAR | · | 3.4 km | MPC · JPL |
| 244362 | 2002 NN_{38} | — | July 9, 2002 | Campo Imperatore | CINEOS | · | 5.2 km | MPC · JPL |
| 244363 | 2002 ND_{41} | — | July 12, 2002 | Palomar | NEAT | · | 4.8 km | MPC · JPL |
| 244364 | 2002 NF_{41} | — | July 13, 2002 | Haleakala | NEAT | · | 1.9 km | MPC · JPL |
| 244365 | 2002 NY_{41} | — | July 14, 2002 | Palomar | NEAT | · | 2.1 km | MPC · JPL |
| 244366 | 2002 NE_{45} | — | July 12, 2002 | Palomar | NEAT | JUN | 1.8 km | MPC · JPL |
| 244367 | 2002 NB_{51} | — | July 3, 2002 | Palomar | NEAT | · | 1.8 km | MPC · JPL |
| 244368 | 2002 NN_{55} | — | July 9, 2002 | Socorro | LINEAR | · | 2.1 km | MPC · JPL |
| 244369 | 2002 NF_{58} | — | July 9, 2002 | Palomar | NEAT | · | 3.5 km | MPC · JPL |
| 244370 | 2002 OL_{14} | — | July 18, 2002 | Socorro | LINEAR | · | 3.1 km | MPC · JPL |
| 244371 | 2002 OL_{16} | — | July 18, 2002 | Socorro | LINEAR | EUN | 1.8 km | MPC · JPL |
| 244372 | 2002 OT_{19} | — | July 27, 2002 | Palomar | NEAT | · | 5.9 km | MPC · JPL |
| 244373 | 2002 OD_{26} | — | July 30, 2002 | Haleakala | NEAT | · | 2.7 km | MPC · JPL |
| 244374 | 2002 OU_{31} | — | July 17, 2002 | Palomar | NEAT | · | 1.8 km | MPC · JPL |
| 244375 | 2002 OB_{33} | — | July 18, 2002 | Palomar | NEAT | · | 4.5 km | MPC · JPL |
| 244376 | 2002 PF_{5} | — | August 4, 2002 | Palomar | NEAT | · | 3.2 km | MPC · JPL |
| 244377 | 2002 PM_{7} | — | August 6, 2002 | Palomar | NEAT | · | 3.1 km | MPC · JPL |
| 244378 | 2002 PT_{8} | — | August 5, 2002 | Palomar | NEAT | · | 1.8 km | MPC · JPL |
| 244379 | 2002 PK_{11} | — | August 5, 2002 | Campo Imperatore | CINEOS | fast | 3.1 km | MPC · JPL |
| 244380 | 2002 PW_{14} | — | August 6, 2002 | Palomar | NEAT | · | 1.8 km | MPC · JPL |
| 244381 | 2002 PH_{15} | — | August 6, 2002 | Palomar | NEAT | · | 2.3 km | MPC · JPL |
| 244382 | 2002 PE_{26} | — | August 6, 2002 | Palomar | NEAT | · | 2.8 km | MPC · JPL |
| 244383 | 2002 PY_{27} | — | August 6, 2002 | Palomar | NEAT | · | 3.4 km | MPC · JPL |
| 244384 | 2002 PW_{29} | — | August 6, 2002 | Palomar | NEAT | NYS | 1.6 km | MPC · JPL |
| 244385 | 2002 PF_{31} | — | August 6, 2002 | Palomar | NEAT | · | 5.1 km | MPC · JPL |
| 244386 | 2002 PL_{38} | — | August 6, 2002 | Palomar | NEAT | ADE | 3.5 km | MPC · JPL |
| 244387 | 2002 PF_{39} | — | August 6, 2002 | Palomar | NEAT | · | 3.3 km | MPC · JPL |
| 244388 | 2002 PL_{64} | — | August 3, 2002 | Palomar | NEAT | · | 3.5 km | MPC · JPL |
| 244389 | 2002 PK_{65} | — | August 11, 2002 | Palomar | NEAT | EUN | 2.0 km | MPC · JPL |
| 244390 | 2002 PE_{69} | — | August 11, 2002 | Socorro | LINEAR | · | 2.0 km | MPC · JPL |
| 244391 | 2002 PB_{75} | — | August 12, 2002 | Socorro | LINEAR | · | 2.7 km | MPC · JPL |
| 244392 | 2002 PE_{89} | — | August 11, 2002 | Socorro | LINEAR | · | 3.7 km | MPC · JPL |
| 244393 | 2002 PS_{90} | — | August 12, 2002 | Anderson Mesa | LONEOS | · | 1.9 km | MPC · JPL |
| 244394 | 2002 PH_{97} | — | August 14, 2002 | Socorro | LINEAR | · | 3.3 km | MPC · JPL |
| 244395 | 2002 PB_{111} | — | August 13, 2002 | Anderson Mesa | LONEOS | · | 2.2 km | MPC · JPL |
| 244396 | 2002 PY_{111} | — | August 14, 2002 | Socorro | LINEAR | · | 3.2 km | MPC · JPL |
| 244397 | 2002 PY_{114} | — | August 15, 2002 | Kitt Peak | Spacewatch | T_{j} (2.99) · 3:2 · SHU | 6.1 km | MPC · JPL |
| 244398 | 2002 PL_{116} | — | August 14, 2002 | Palomar | NEAT | · | 2.5 km | MPC · JPL |
| 244399 | 2002 PX_{117} | — | August 13, 2002 | Palomar | NEAT | · | 1.8 km | MPC · JPL |
| 244400 | 2002 PM_{118} | — | August 13, 2002 | Anderson Mesa | LONEOS | · | 1.7 km | MPC · JPL |

== 244401–244500 ==
back to top

| Designation | | | Discovery | | | Properties | | Ref |
| Permanent | Provisional | Named after | Date | Site | Discoverer(s) | Category | Diam. | Ref |
|---|---|---|---|---|---|---|---|---|
| 244401 | 2002 PL_{123} | — | August 15, 2002 | Palomar | NEAT | · | 3.3 km | MPC · JPL |
| 244402 | 2002 PZ_{124} | — | August 13, 2002 | Anderson Mesa | LONEOS | · | 2.9 km | MPC · JPL |
| 244403 | 2002 PM_{126} | — | August 14, 2002 | Socorro | LINEAR | · | 1.7 km | MPC · JPL |
| 244404 | 2002 PL_{131} | — | August 14, 2002 | Palomar | NEAT | · | 1.8 km | MPC · JPL |
| 244405 | 2002 PV_{136} | — | August 15, 2002 | Anderson Mesa | LONEOS | · | 2.7 km | MPC · JPL |
| 244406 | 2002 PH_{140} | — | August 14, 2002 | Socorro | LINEAR | · | 1.5 km | MPC · JPL |
| 244407 | 2002 PG_{141} | — | August 4, 2002 | Socorro | LINEAR | · | 3.0 km | MPC · JPL |
| 244408 | 2002 PK_{171} | — | August 15, 2002 | Palomar | NEAT | · | 2.0 km | MPC · JPL |
| 244409 | 2002 PP_{171} | — | August 14, 2002 | Palomar | NEAT | · | 2.2 km | MPC · JPL |
| 244410 | 2002 PW_{174} | — | August 15, 2002 | Palomar | NEAT | · | 3.6 km | MPC · JPL |
| 244411 | 2002 PN_{178} | — | August 15, 2002 | Palomar | NEAT | · | 3.1 km | MPC · JPL |
| 244412 | 2002 PQ_{185} | — | August 15, 2002 | Palomar | NEAT | · | 1.8 km | MPC · JPL |
| 244413 | 2002 PQ_{186} | — | August 11, 2002 | Palomar | NEAT | · | 2.4 km | MPC · JPL |
| 244414 | 2002 PJ_{189} | — | August 7, 2002 | Palomar | NEAT | · | 1.6 km | MPC · JPL |
| 244415 | 2002 PH_{191} | — | August 14, 2002 | Palomar | NEAT | · | 2.3 km | MPC · JPL |
| 244416 | 2002 QH | — | August 16, 2002 | Socorro | LINEAR | · | 1.5 km | MPC · JPL |
| 244417 | 2002 QP_{4} | — | August 16, 2002 | Palomar | NEAT | · | 5.7 km | MPC · JPL |
| 244418 | 2002 QK_{6} | — | August 18, 2002 | Cottage Grove | Tenagra | H | 990 m | MPC · JPL |
| 244419 | 2002 QV_{14} | — | August 26, 2002 | Palomar | NEAT | · | 1.3 km | MPC · JPL |
| 244420 | 2002 QZ_{18} | — | August 26, 2002 | Palomar | NEAT | · | 3.9 km | MPC · JPL |
| 244421 | 2002 QO_{45} | — | August 31, 2002 | Anderson Mesa | LONEOS | · | 4.5 km | MPC · JPL |
| 244422 | 2002 QA_{50} | — | August 18, 2002 | Palomar | S. F. Hönig | · | 2.2 km | MPC · JPL |
| 244423 | 2002 QL_{55} | — | August 29, 2002 | Palomar | S. F. Hönig | WIT | 1.3 km | MPC · JPL |
| 244424 | 2002 QX_{60} | — | August 28, 2002 | Palomar | NEAT | · | 3.0 km | MPC · JPL |
| 244425 | 2002 QM_{62} | — | August 28, 2002 | Palomar | NEAT | · | 1.8 km | MPC · JPL |
| 244426 | 2002 QF_{74} | — | August 28, 2002 | Palomar | NEAT | · | 1.1 km | MPC · JPL |
| 244427 | 2002 QV_{78} | — | August 17, 2002 | Palomar | NEAT | (11882) | 1.7 km | MPC · JPL |
| 244428 | 2002 QH_{89} | — | August 27, 2002 | Palomar | NEAT | · | 2.6 km | MPC · JPL |
| 244429 | 2002 QX_{92} | — | August 29, 2002 | Palomar | NEAT | · | 1.4 km | MPC · JPL |
| 244430 | 2002 QH_{96} | — | August 18, 2002 | Palomar | NEAT | AGN | 1.5 km | MPC · JPL |
| 244431 | 2002 QZ_{97} | — | August 18, 2002 | Palomar | NEAT | · | 1.6 km | MPC · JPL |
| 244432 | 2002 QM_{99} | — | August 18, 2002 | Palomar | NEAT | · | 2.4 km | MPC · JPL |
| 244433 | 2002 QT_{109} | — | August 17, 2002 | Palomar | NEAT | · | 1.6 km | MPC · JPL |
| 244434 | 2002 QW_{117} | — | August 16, 2002 | Palomar | NEAT | · | 2.4 km | MPC · JPL |
| 244435 | 2002 QT_{121} | — | August 16, 2002 | Palomar | NEAT | · | 2.1 km | MPC · JPL |
| 244436 | 2002 RT_{7} | — | September 3, 2002 | Haleakala | NEAT | · | 7.7 km | MPC · JPL |
| 244437 | 2002 RT_{10} | — | September 4, 2002 | Palomar | NEAT | · | 2.9 km | MPC · JPL |
| 244438 | 2002 RX_{44} | — | September 5, 2002 | Socorro | LINEAR | T_{j} (2.98) · HIL · 3:2 | 7.7 km | MPC · JPL |
| 244439 | 2002 RC_{46} | — | September 5, 2002 | Socorro | LINEAR | · | 1.8 km | MPC · JPL |
| 244440 | 2002 RY_{48} | — | September 5, 2002 | Socorro | LINEAR | · | 1.9 km | MPC · JPL |
| 244441 | 2002 RY_{49} | — | September 5, 2002 | Socorro | LINEAR | · | 2.8 km | MPC · JPL |
| 244442 | 2002 RJ_{53} | — | September 5, 2002 | Socorro | LINEAR | · | 3.3 km | MPC · JPL |
| 244443 | 2002 RV_{56} | — | September 5, 2002 | Anderson Mesa | LONEOS | · | 4.9 km | MPC · JPL |
| 244444 | 2002 RT_{66} | — | September 3, 2002 | Palomar | NEAT | · | 3.4 km | MPC · JPL |
| 244445 | 2002 RA_{69} | — | September 4, 2002 | Anderson Mesa | LONEOS | · | 2.3 km | MPC · JPL |
| 244446 | 2002 RQ_{70} | — | September 4, 2002 | Palomar | NEAT | · | 2.3 km | MPC · JPL |
| 244447 | 2002 RE_{72} | — | September 5, 2002 | Socorro | LINEAR | · | 2.0 km | MPC · JPL |
| 244448 | 2002 RZ_{76} | — | September 5, 2002 | Socorro | LINEAR | · | 2.6 km | MPC · JPL |
| 244449 | 2002 RF_{97} | — | September 5, 2002 | Socorro | LINEAR | · | 2.9 km | MPC · JPL |
| 244450 | 2002 RQ_{102} | — | September 5, 2002 | Socorro | LINEAR | · | 3.3 km | MPC · JPL |
| 244451 | 2002 RE_{118} | — | September 5, 2002 | Socorro | LINEAR | · | 3.4 km | MPC · JPL |
| 244452 | 2002 RE_{122} | — | September 8, 2002 | Haleakala | NEAT | DOR | 3.7 km | MPC · JPL |
| 244453 | 2002 RC_{128} | — | September 10, 2002 | Palomar | NEAT | ADE | 2.8 km | MPC · JPL |
| 244454 | 2002 RJ_{132} | — | September 11, 2002 | Palomar | NEAT | · | 5.0 km | MPC · JPL |
| 244455 | 2002 RL_{138} | — | September 10, 2002 | Palomar | NEAT | · | 3.1 km | MPC · JPL |
| 244456 | 2002 RS_{141} | — | September 10, 2002 | Haleakala | NEAT | · | 750 m | MPC · JPL |
| 244457 | 2002 RT_{151} | — | September 12, 2002 | Palomar | NEAT | · | 3.5 km | MPC · JPL |
| 244458 | 2002 RM_{157} | — | September 11, 2002 | Palomar | NEAT | · | 1.8 km | MPC · JPL |
| 244459 | 2002 RW_{167} | — | September 13, 2002 | Palomar | NEAT | · | 1.5 km | MPC · JPL |
| 244460 | 2002 RW_{171} | — | September 13, 2002 | Kitt Peak | Spacewatch | VER | 5.1 km | MPC · JPL |
| 244461 | 2002 RU_{173} | — | September 13, 2002 | Palomar | NEAT | · | 6.2 km | MPC · JPL |
| 244462 | 2002 RQ_{174} | — | September 13, 2002 | Palomar | NEAT | · | 2.8 km | MPC · JPL |
| 244463 | 2002 RM_{178} | — | September 14, 2002 | Palomar | NEAT | · | 6.0 km | MPC · JPL |
| 244464 | 2002 RY_{178} | — | September 14, 2002 | Kitt Peak | Spacewatch | · | 1.8 km | MPC · JPL |
| 244465 | 2002 RO_{184} | — | September 12, 2002 | Palomar | NEAT | · | 3.1 km | MPC · JPL |
| 244466 | 2002 RD_{189} | — | September 13, 2002 | Palomar | NEAT | · | 2.4 km | MPC · JPL |
| 244467 | 2002 RQ_{203} | — | September 14, 2002 | Palomar | NEAT | GEF | 1.8 km | MPC · JPL |
| 244468 | 2002 RU_{205} | — | September 14, 2002 | Palomar | NEAT | · | 1.6 km | MPC · JPL |
| 244469 | 2002 RC_{237} | — | September 14, 2002 | Haleakala | R. Matson | · | 3.7 km | MPC · JPL |
| 244470 | 2002 RR_{246} | — | September 14, 2002 | Palomar | NEAT | · | 3.8 km | MPC · JPL |
| 244471 | 2002 RD_{257} | — | September 12, 2002 | Palomar | NEAT | · | 1.8 km | MPC · JPL |
| 244472 | 2002 RW_{260} | — | September 10, 2002 | Palomar | NEAT | · | 1.8 km | MPC · JPL |
| 244473 | 2002 RT_{280} | — | September 1, 2002 | Palomar | NEAT | · | 2.7 km | MPC · JPL |
| 244474 | 2002 SA_{6} | — | September 27, 2002 | Palomar | NEAT | · | 3.1 km | MPC · JPL |
| 244475 | 2002 SS_{11} | — | September 27, 2002 | Palomar | NEAT | · | 3.7 km | MPC · JPL |
| 244476 | 2002 SJ_{15} | — | September 27, 2002 | Palomar | NEAT | · | 3.3 km | MPC · JPL |
| 244477 | 2002 SJ_{17} | — | September 26, 2002 | Palomar | NEAT | · | 1.5 km | MPC · JPL |
| 244478 | 2002 SY_{22} | — | September 26, 2002 | Haleakala | NEAT | HIL · 3:2 | 10 km | MPC · JPL |
| 244479 | 2002 SA_{26} | — | September 28, 2002 | Haleakala | NEAT | · | 1.8 km | MPC · JPL |
| 244480 | 2002 SA_{39} | — | September 30, 2002 | Socorro | LINEAR | · | 3.0 km | MPC · JPL |
| 244481 | 2002 SH_{58} | — | September 30, 2002 | Haleakala | NEAT | · | 5.9 km | MPC · JPL |
| 244482 | 2002 SZ_{59} | — | September 16, 2002 | Haleakala | NEAT | TRE | 3.3 km | MPC · JPL |
| 244483 | 2002 ST_{61} | — | September 17, 2002 | Palomar | NEAT | · | 2.1 km | MPC · JPL |
| 244484 | 2002 SW_{71} | — | September 29, 2002 | Haleakala | NEAT | · | 2.2 km | MPC · JPL |
| 244485 | 2002 TF_{1} | — | October 1, 2002 | Anderson Mesa | LONEOS | · | 4.3 km | MPC · JPL |
| 244486 | 2002 TU_{6} | — | October 1, 2002 | Anderson Mesa | LONEOS | URS | 6.9 km | MPC · JPL |
| 244487 | 2002 TB_{16} | — | October 2, 2002 | Socorro | LINEAR | · | 1.7 km | MPC · JPL |
| 244488 | 2002 TV_{19} | — | October 2, 2002 | Socorro | LINEAR | 3:2 · SHU | 8.6 km | MPC · JPL |
| 244489 | 2002 TD_{39} | — | October 2, 2002 | Socorro | LINEAR | · | 1.5 km | MPC · JPL |
| 244490 | 2002 TM_{39} | — | October 2, 2002 | Socorro | LINEAR | EUN | 2.0 km | MPC · JPL |
| 244491 | 2002 TH_{51} | — | October 2, 2002 | Socorro | LINEAR | EUN | 1.8 km | MPC · JPL |
| 244492 | 2002 TZ_{52} | — | October 2, 2002 | Socorro | LINEAR | · | 3.1 km | MPC · JPL |
| 244493 | 2002 TB_{62} | — | October 3, 2002 | Campo Imperatore | CINEOS | GEF | 1.8 km | MPC · JPL |
| 244494 | 2002 TB_{63} | — | October 3, 2002 | Campo Imperatore | CINEOS | · | 2.4 km | MPC · JPL |
| 244495 | 2002 TB_{76} | — | October 1, 2002 | Anderson Mesa | LONEOS | · | 4.0 km | MPC · JPL |
| 244496 | 2002 TQ_{76} | — | October 1, 2002 | Anderson Mesa | LONEOS | · | 3.9 km | MPC · JPL |
| 244497 | 2002 TZ_{80} | — | October 1, 2002 | Socorro | LINEAR | · | 3.2 km | MPC · JPL |
| 244498 | 2002 TF_{84} | — | October 2, 2002 | Haleakala | NEAT | · | 4.6 km | MPC · JPL |
| 244499 | 2002 TK_{90} | — | October 3, 2002 | Palomar | NEAT | · | 5.4 km | MPC · JPL |
| 244500 | 2002 TE_{93} | — | October 2, 2002 | Socorro | LINEAR | · | 2.5 km | MPC · JPL |

== 244501–244600 ==
back to top

| Designation | | | Discovery | | | Properties | | Ref |
| Permanent | Provisional | Named after | Date | Site | Discoverer(s) | Category | Diam. | Ref |
|---|---|---|---|---|---|---|---|---|
| 244501 | 2002 TB_{117} | — | October 3, 2002 | Palomar | NEAT | · | 5.5 km | MPC · JPL |
| 244502 | 2002 TY_{121} | — | October 3, 2002 | Palomar | NEAT | · | 4.9 km | MPC · JPL |
| 244503 | 2002 TB_{123} | — | October 4, 2002 | Palomar | NEAT | · | 3.7 km | MPC · JPL |
| 244504 | 2002 TV_{133} | — | October 4, 2002 | Anderson Mesa | LONEOS | · | 3.8 km | MPC · JPL |
| 244505 | 2002 TM_{134} | — | October 4, 2002 | Palomar | NEAT | · | 4.2 km | MPC · JPL |
| 244506 | 2002 TG_{137} | — | October 4, 2002 | Anderson Mesa | LONEOS | · | 3.0 km | MPC · JPL |
| 244507 | 2002 TK_{154} | — | October 5, 2002 | Socorro | LINEAR | NAE | 5.9 km | MPC · JPL |
| 244508 | 2002 TM_{155} | — | October 5, 2002 | Socorro | LINEAR | · | 3.8 km | MPC · JPL |
| 244509 | 2002 TP_{155} | — | October 5, 2002 | Palomar | NEAT | · | 3.4 km | MPC · JPL |
| 244510 | 2002 TN_{158} | — | October 5, 2002 | Palomar | NEAT | JUN | 1.3 km | MPC · JPL |
| 244511 | 2002 TK_{163} | — | October 5, 2002 | Palomar | NEAT | · | 3.1 km | MPC · JPL |
| 244512 | 2002 TJ_{164} | — | October 5, 2002 | Palomar | NEAT | EUN | 1.6 km | MPC · JPL |
| 244513 | 2002 TQ_{169} | — | October 3, 2002 | Palomar | NEAT | · | 3.4 km | MPC · JPL |
| 244514 | 2002 TS_{172} | — | October 4, 2002 | Anderson Mesa | LONEOS | · | 2.4 km | MPC · JPL |
| 244515 | 2002 TT_{176} | — | October 5, 2002 | Socorro | LINEAR | · | 5.8 km | MPC · JPL |
| 244516 | 2002 TP_{182} | — | October 4, 2002 | Palomar | NEAT | · | 3.2 km | MPC · JPL |
| 244517 | 2002 TU_{198} | — | October 5, 2002 | Anderson Mesa | LONEOS | · | 6.6 km | MPC · JPL |
| 244518 | 2002 TY_{199} | — | October 6, 2002 | Anderson Mesa | LONEOS | · | 2.4 km | MPC · JPL |
| 244519 | 2002 TM_{207} | — | October 4, 2002 | Socorro | LINEAR | · | 5.1 km | MPC · JPL |
| 244520 | 2002 TO_{211} | — | October 5, 2002 | Socorro | LINEAR | · | 2.2 km | MPC · JPL |
| 244521 | 2002 TM_{212} | — | October 7, 2002 | Haleakala | NEAT | · | 1.4 km | MPC · JPL |
| 244522 | 2002 TW_{221} | — | October 7, 2002 | Socorro | LINEAR | PAL | 2.9 km | MPC · JPL |
| 244523 | 2002 TJ_{222} | — | October 7, 2002 | Anderson Mesa | LONEOS | · | 2.5 km | MPC · JPL |
| 244524 | 2002 TO_{222} | — | October 7, 2002 | Socorro | LINEAR | · | 3.3 km | MPC · JPL |
| 244525 | 2002 TQ_{232} | — | October 6, 2002 | Socorro | LINEAR | · | 5.8 km | MPC · JPL |
| 244526 | 2002 TU_{232} | — | October 6, 2002 | Socorro | LINEAR | · | 4.9 km | MPC · JPL |
| 244527 | 2002 TT_{238} | — | October 7, 2002 | Socorro | LINEAR | TIR | 4.8 km | MPC · JPL |
| 244528 | 2002 TH_{243} | — | October 9, 2002 | Kitt Peak | Spacewatch | · | 3.3 km | MPC · JPL |
| 244529 | 2002 TG_{269} | — | October 9, 2002 | Socorro | LINEAR | · | 2.7 km | MPC · JPL |
| 244530 | 2002 TX_{278} | — | October 10, 2002 | Socorro | LINEAR | · | 4.7 km | MPC · JPL |
| 244531 | 2002 TW_{283} | — | October 10, 2002 | Socorro | LINEAR | (5) | 1.8 km | MPC · JPL |
| 244532 | 2002 TX_{299} | — | October 15, 2002 | Palomar | NEAT | · | 2.7 km | MPC · JPL |
| 244533 | 2002 TX_{378} | — | October 5, 2002 | Palomar | NEAT | NEM | 2.3 km | MPC · JPL |
| 244534 | 2002 TP_{383} | — | October 5, 2002 | Apache Point | SDSS | · | 2.1 km | MPC · JPL |
| 244535 | 2002 TV_{383} | — | October 8, 2002 | Palomar | NEAT | · | 2.8 km | MPC · JPL |
| 244536 | 2002 UQ_{2} | — | October 28, 2002 | Socorro | LINEAR | H | 1.0 km | MPC · JPL |
| 244537 | 2002 UE_{29} | — | October 31, 2002 | Socorro | LINEAR | · | 1.4 km | MPC · JPL |
| 244538 | 2002 UC_{30} | — | October 30, 2002 | Socorro | LINEAR | · | 3.4 km | MPC · JPL |
| 244539 | 2002 UT_{35} | — | October 31, 2002 | Palomar | NEAT | · | 6.3 km | MPC · JPL |
| 244540 | 2002 UT_{70} | — | October 30, 2002 | Socorro | LINEAR | THB | 5.1 km | MPC · JPL |
| 244541 | 2002 UY_{70} | — | October 31, 2002 | Socorro | LINEAR | THB | 4.8 km | MPC · JPL |
| 244542 | 2002 UK_{71} | — | October 29, 2002 | Palomar | NEAT | · | 2.7 km | MPC · JPL |
| 244543 | 2002 UG_{72} | — | October 16, 2002 | Palomar | NEAT | · | 2.8 km | MPC · JPL |
| 244544 | 2002 UO_{73} | — | October 31, 2002 | Palomar | NEAT | · | 4.4 km | MPC · JPL |
| 244545 | 2002 UX_{77} | — | October 29, 2002 | Palomar | NEAT | · | 2.0 km | MPC · JPL |
| 244546 | 2002 UD_{78} | — | October 31, 2002 | Apache Point | SDSS | · | 2.4 km | MPC · JPL |
| 244547 | 2002 UO_{78} | — | October 29, 2002 | Palomar | NEAT | · | 4.7 km | MPC · JPL |
| 244548 | 2002 VS_{11} | — | November 1, 2002 | Palomar | NEAT | · | 3.7 km | MPC · JPL |
| 244549 | 2002 VR_{16} | — | November 5, 2002 | Socorro | LINEAR | · | 3.6 km | MPC · JPL |
| 244550 | 2002 VP_{35} | — | November 5, 2002 | Socorro | LINEAR | · | 3.6 km | MPC · JPL |
| 244551 | 2002 VJ_{45} | — | November 5, 2002 | Socorro | LINEAR | · | 4.6 km | MPC · JPL |
| 244552 | 2002 VN_{50} | — | November 5, 2002 | Anderson Mesa | LONEOS | · | 3.3 km | MPC · JPL |
| 244553 | 2002 VN_{56} | — | November 6, 2002 | Anderson Mesa | LONEOS | · | 1.0 km | MPC · JPL |
| 244554 | 2002 VX_{57} | — | November 6, 2002 | Haleakala | NEAT | · | 1.7 km | MPC · JPL |
| 244555 | 2002 VX_{59} | — | November 3, 2002 | Haleakala | NEAT | · | 5.5 km | MPC · JPL |
| 244556 | 2002 VA_{61} | — | November 5, 2002 | Socorro | LINEAR | CYB | 4.8 km | MPC · JPL |
| 244557 | 2002 VY_{62} | — | November 6, 2002 | Socorro | LINEAR | · | 5.4 km | MPC · JPL |
| 244558 | 2002 VC_{83} | — | November 7, 2002 | Socorro | LINEAR | · | 5.5 km | MPC · JPL |
| 244559 | 2002 VV_{85} | — | November 11, 2002 | Socorro | LINEAR | H | 990 m | MPC · JPL |
| 244560 | 2002 VG_{92} | — | November 11, 2002 | Socorro | LINEAR | · | 2.0 km | MPC · JPL |
| 244561 | 2002 VT_{101} | — | November 11, 2002 | Socorro | LINEAR | · | 7.7 km | MPC · JPL |
| 244562 | 2002 VE_{104} | — | November 12, 2002 | Socorro | LINEAR | · | 4.3 km | MPC · JPL |
| 244563 | 2002 VG_{107} | — | November 12, 2002 | Socorro | LINEAR | · | 4.3 km | MPC · JPL |
| 244564 | 2002 VF_{116} | — | November 12, 2002 | Anderson Mesa | LONEOS | · | 3.8 km | MPC · JPL |
| 244565 | 2002 VZ_{116} | — | November 13, 2002 | Palomar | NEAT | · | 2.7 km | MPC · JPL |
| 244566 | 2002 VC_{117} | — | November 13, 2002 | Palomar | NEAT | · | 2.7 km | MPC · JPL |
| 244567 | 2002 VR_{126} | — | November 13, 2002 | Palomar | NEAT | EUP | 5.3 km | MPC · JPL |
| 244568 | 2002 VC_{140} | — | November 13, 2002 | Palomar | NEAT | · | 3.7 km | MPC · JPL |
| 244569 | 2002 VD_{141} | — | November 1, 2002 | Palomar | NEAT | · | 4.5 km | MPC · JPL |
| 244570 | 2002 VP_{143} | — | November 15, 2002 | Palomar | NEAT | · | 4.3 km | MPC · JPL |
| 244571 | 2002 WU | — | November 21, 2002 | Palomar | NEAT | · | 5.1 km | MPC · JPL |
| 244572 | 2002 WV_{5} | — | November 23, 2002 | Palomar | NEAT | · | 2.9 km | MPC · JPL |
| 244573 | 2002 WW_{10} | — | November 25, 2002 | Palomar | NEAT | · | 4.3 km | MPC · JPL |
| 244574 | 2002 WZ_{14} | — | November 28, 2002 | Anderson Mesa | LONEOS | · | 1.5 km | MPC · JPL |
| 244575 | 2002 XX | — | December 1, 2002 | Haleakala | NEAT | · | 5.0 km | MPC · JPL |
| 244576 | 2002 XA_{3} | — | December 1, 2002 | Socorro | LINEAR | TIR | 3.6 km | MPC · JPL |
| 244577 | 2002 XF_{5} | — | December 2, 2002 | Socorro | LINEAR | PHO | 1.6 km | MPC · JPL |
| 244578 | 2002 XD_{6} | — | December 1, 2002 | Socorro | LINEAR | · | 4.2 km | MPC · JPL |
| 244579 | 2002 XA_{8} | — | December 2, 2002 | Socorro | LINEAR | · | 3.4 km | MPC · JPL |
| 244580 | 2002 XU_{8} | — | December 2, 2002 | Socorro | LINEAR | · | 5.2 km | MPC · JPL |
| 244581 | 2002 XR_{9} | — | December 2, 2002 | Socorro | LINEAR | EOS | 2.7 km | MPC · JPL |
| 244582 | 2002 XH_{10} | — | December 2, 2002 | Haleakala | NEAT | · | 2.6 km | MPC · JPL |
| 244583 | 2002 XM_{16} | — | December 3, 2002 | Palomar | NEAT | EUN | 1.9 km | MPC · JPL |
| 244584 | 2002 XD_{30} | — | December 6, 2002 | Socorro | LINEAR | ADE | 2.7 km | MPC · JPL |
| 244585 | 2002 XA_{31} | — | December 6, 2002 | Socorro | LINEAR | · | 2.1 km | MPC · JPL |
| 244586 | 2002 XZ_{31} | — | December 6, 2002 | Socorro | LINEAR | EUN | 1.7 km | MPC · JPL |
| 244587 | 2002 XS_{47} | — | December 10, 2002 | Socorro | LINEAR | · | 3.7 km | MPC · JPL |
| 244588 | 2002 XK_{54} | — | December 10, 2002 | Palomar | NEAT | · | 6.9 km | MPC · JPL |
| 244589 | 2002 XK_{62} | — | December 11, 2002 | Socorro | LINEAR | EOS | 3.1 km | MPC · JPL |
| 244590 | 2002 XS_{62} | — | December 11, 2002 | Socorro | LINEAR | · | 3.0 km | MPC · JPL |
| 244591 | 2002 XZ_{63} | — | December 11, 2002 | Socorro | LINEAR | · | 4.4 km | MPC · JPL |
| 244592 | 2002 XX_{69} | — | December 5, 2002 | Socorro | LINEAR | · | 3.0 km | MPC · JPL |
| 244593 | 2002 XB_{70} | — | December 10, 2002 | Palomar | NEAT | · | 4.1 km | MPC · JPL |
| 244594 | 2002 XA_{83} | — | December 13, 2002 | Palomar | NEAT | · | 5.2 km | MPC · JPL |
| 244595 | 2002 XT_{83} | — | December 13, 2002 | Anderson Mesa | LONEOS | · | 3.1 km | MPC · JPL |
| 244596 | 2002 XJ_{84} | — | December 11, 2002 | Palomar | NEAT | · | 4.8 km | MPC · JPL |
| 244597 | 2002 XN_{84} | — | December 13, 2002 | Socorro | LINEAR | · | 4.3 km | MPC · JPL |
| 244598 | 2002 XJ_{89} | — | December 14, 2002 | Socorro | LINEAR | · | 4.0 km | MPC · JPL |
| 244599 | 2002 XP_{118} | — | December 3, 2002 | Palomar | NEAT | · | 2.4 km | MPC · JPL |
| 244600 | 2002 XX_{118} | — | December 10, 2002 | Palomar | NEAT | · | 3.6 km | MPC · JPL |

== 244601–244700 ==
back to top

| Designation | | | Discovery | | | Properties | | Ref |
| Permanent | Provisional | Named after | Date | Site | Discoverer(s) | Category | Diam. | Ref |
|---|---|---|---|---|---|---|---|---|
| 244601 | 2002 YQ_{1} | — | December 27, 2002 | Anderson Mesa | LONEOS | · | 4.9 km | MPC · JPL |
| 244602 | 2002 YP_{3} | — | December 28, 2002 | Socorro | LINEAR | · | 4.5 km | MPC · JPL |
| 244603 | 2002 YH_{17} | — | December 31, 2002 | Socorro | LINEAR | · | 7.2 km | MPC · JPL |
| 244604 | 2002 YH_{23} | — | December 31, 2002 | Socorro | LINEAR | · | 2.7 km | MPC · JPL |
| 244605 | 2002 YX_{28} | — | December 31, 2002 | Socorro | LINEAR | · | 1.1 km | MPC · JPL |
| 244606 | 2002 YA_{30} | — | December 31, 2002 | Socorro | LINEAR | CYB | 3.3 km | MPC · JPL |
| 244607 | 2002 YX_{34} | — | December 31, 2002 | Socorro | LINEAR | · | 4.5 km | MPC · JPL |
| 244608 | 2003 AG_{5} | — | January 1, 2003 | Socorro | LINEAR | · | 4.5 km | MPC · JPL |
| 244609 | 2003 AV_{7} | — | January 2, 2003 | Socorro | LINEAR | · | 960 m | MPC · JPL |
| 244610 | 2003 AZ_{10} | — | January 1, 2003 | Socorro | LINEAR | · | 4.0 km | MPC · JPL |
| 244611 | 2003 AH_{13} | — | January 1, 2003 | Socorro | LINEAR | · | 4.2 km | MPC · JPL |
| 244612 | 2003 AO_{19} | — | January 5, 2003 | Socorro | LINEAR | TEL | 2.2 km | MPC · JPL |
| 244613 | 2003 AU_{34} | — | January 7, 2003 | Socorro | LINEAR | · | 6.4 km | MPC · JPL |
| 244614 | 2003 AQ_{50} | — | January 5, 2003 | Socorro | LINEAR | EUP · slow | 6.6 km | MPC · JPL |
| 244615 | 2003 AW_{54} | — | January 5, 2003 | Socorro | LINEAR | · | 1.3 km | MPC · JPL |
| 244616 | 2003 AR_{62} | — | January 8, 2003 | Socorro | LINEAR | · | 7.1 km | MPC · JPL |
| 244617 | 2003 AQ_{65} | — | January 7, 2003 | Socorro | LINEAR | EUN | 2.4 km | MPC · JPL |
| 244618 | 2003 AN_{74} | — | January 10, 2003 | Socorro | LINEAR | · | 6.6 km | MPC · JPL |
| 244619 | 2003 AP_{88} | — | January 2, 2003 | Socorro | LINEAR | · | 3.5 km | MPC · JPL |
| 244620 | 2003 AD_{94} | — | January 2, 2003 | Socorro | LINEAR | T_{j} (2.98) · EUP | 5.0 km | MPC · JPL |
| 244621 | 2003 BN_{11} | — | January 26, 2003 | Anderson Mesa | LONEOS | · | 5.2 km | MPC · JPL |
| 244622 | 2003 BC_{13} | — | January 26, 2003 | Haleakala | NEAT | · | 1.3 km | MPC · JPL |
| 244623 | 2003 BD_{17} | — | January 26, 2003 | Haleakala | NEAT | · | 5.1 km | MPC · JPL |
| 244624 | 2003 BO_{18} | — | January 27, 2003 | Socorro | LINEAR | URS | 4.7 km | MPC · JPL |
| 244625 | 2003 BS_{24} | — | January 25, 2003 | Palomar | NEAT | · | 3.0 km | MPC · JPL |
| 244626 | 2003 BD_{29} | — | January 27, 2003 | Anderson Mesa | LONEOS | · | 1.0 km | MPC · JPL |
| 244627 | 2003 BL_{29} | — | January 27, 2003 | Socorro | LINEAR | · | 1.0 km | MPC · JPL |
| 244628 | 2003 BK_{50} | — | January 27, 2003 | Socorro | LINEAR | EUP | 5.1 km | MPC · JPL |
| 244629 | 2003 BV_{51} | — | January 27, 2003 | Socorro | LINEAR | (1547) | 1.9 km | MPC · JPL |
| 244630 | 2003 BD_{59} | — | January 27, 2003 | Socorro | LINEAR | PAD | 3.1 km | MPC · JPL |
| 244631 | 2003 BA_{71} | — | January 31, 2003 | Kitt Peak | Spacewatch | · | 3.6 km | MPC · JPL |
| 244632 | 2003 BA_{74} | — | January 29, 2003 | Palomar | NEAT | · | 2.3 km | MPC · JPL |
| 244633 | 2003 BJ_{74} | — | January 29, 2003 | Palomar | NEAT | · | 4.3 km | MPC · JPL |
| 244634 | 2003 CD_{15} | — | February 4, 2003 | Socorro | LINEAR | · | 870 m | MPC · JPL |
| 244635 | 2003 DR_{2} | — | February 22, 2003 | Kitt Peak | Spacewatch | · | 800 m | MPC · JPL |
| 244636 | 2003 ED_{2} | — | March 5, 2003 | Socorro | LINEAR | · | 1.1 km | MPC · JPL |
| 244637 | 2003 EQ_{7} | — | March 6, 2003 | Anderson Mesa | LONEOS | · | 4.4 km | MPC · JPL |
| 244638 | 2003 ET_{9} | — | March 6, 2003 | Anderson Mesa | LONEOS | · | 920 m | MPC · JPL |
| 244639 | 2003 EB_{18} | — | March 6, 2003 | Anderson Mesa | LONEOS | · | 790 m | MPC · JPL |
| 244640 | 2003 EP_{46} | — | March 8, 2003 | Anderson Mesa | LONEOS | · | 910 m | MPC · JPL |
| 244641 | 2003 FU_{13} | — | March 23, 2003 | Kitt Peak | Spacewatch | · | 860 m | MPC · JPL |
| 244642 | 2003 FD_{16} | — | March 23, 2003 | Palomar | NEAT | · | 1.2 km | MPC · JPL |
| 244643 | 2003 FR_{17} | — | March 24, 2003 | Kitt Peak | Spacewatch | · | 900 m | MPC · JPL |
| 244644 | 2003 FZ_{45} | — | March 24, 2003 | Kitt Peak | Spacewatch | · | 5.4 km | MPC · JPL |
| 244645 | 2003 FL_{82} | — | March 27, 2003 | Palomar | NEAT | HNS | 2.6 km | MPC · JPL |
| 244646 | 2003 FM_{88} | — | March 28, 2003 | Kitt Peak | Spacewatch | · | 1.1 km | MPC · JPL |
| 244647 | 2003 FF_{96} | — | March 30, 2003 | Anderson Mesa | LONEOS | · | 1.3 km | MPC · JPL |
| 244648 | 2003 FZ_{118} | — | March 26, 2003 | Anderson Mesa | LONEOS | · | 4.2 km | MPC · JPL |
| 244649 | 2003 FE_{131} | — | March 23, 2003 | Kitt Peak | Spacewatch | · | 2.0 km | MPC · JPL |
| 244650 | 2003 GZ | — | April 1, 2003 | Socorro | LINEAR | · | 4.3 km | MPC · JPL |
| 244651 | 2003 GF_{3} | — | April 1, 2003 | Socorro | LINEAR | · | 1.8 km | MPC · JPL |
| 244652 | 2003 GH_{7} | — | April 1, 2003 | Socorro | LINEAR | · | 2.0 km | MPC · JPL |
| 244653 | 2003 GY_{38} | — | April 8, 2003 | Kitt Peak | Spacewatch | · | 1.0 km | MPC · JPL |
| 244654 | 2003 HR_{9} | — | April 25, 2003 | Campo Imperatore | CINEOS | · | 7.3 km | MPC · JPL |
| 244655 | 2003 HS_{10} | — | April 25, 2003 | Kitt Peak | Spacewatch | · | 1.4 km | MPC · JPL |
| 244656 | 2003 HG_{12} | — | April 25, 2003 | Campo Imperatore | CINEOS | V | 1.1 km | MPC · JPL |
| 244657 | 2003 HV_{17} | — | April 25, 2003 | Kitt Peak | Spacewatch | · | 850 m | MPC · JPL |
| 244658 | 2003 HX_{20} | — | April 24, 2003 | Anderson Mesa | LONEOS | · | 7.3 km | MPC · JPL |
| 244659 | 2003 HN_{26} | — | April 26, 2003 | Kitt Peak | Spacewatch | · | 1.1 km | MPC · JPL |
| 244660 | 2003 HX_{26} | — | April 27, 2003 | Anderson Mesa | LONEOS | · | 1.1 km | MPC · JPL |
| 244661 | 2003 HN_{27} | — | April 28, 2003 | Haleakala | NEAT | · | 1.1 km | MPC · JPL |
| 244662 | 2003 HK_{28} | — | April 26, 2003 | Haleakala | NEAT | · | 1.1 km | MPC · JPL |
| 244663 | 2003 HH_{53} | — | April 30, 2003 | Reedy Creek | J. Broughton | · | 2.0 km | MPC · JPL |
| 244664 | 2003 HN_{53} | — | April 22, 2003 | Goodricke-Pigott | Kessel, J. W. | · | 1.0 km | MPC · JPL |
| 244665 | 2003 HX_{57} | — | April 28, 2003 | Socorro | LINEAR | · | 2.4 km | MPC · JPL |
| 244666 | 2003 JT_{1} | — | May 1, 2003 | Socorro | LINEAR | H | 590 m | MPC · JPL |
| 244667 | 2003 JH_{5} | — | May 1, 2003 | Socorro | LINEAR | · | 2.3 km | MPC · JPL |
| 244668 | 2003 KF_{6} | — | May 25, 2003 | Kitt Peak | Spacewatch | · | 5.7 km | MPC · JPL |
| 244669 | 2003 KE_{14} | — | May 25, 2003 | Kitt Peak | Spacewatch | · | 1.0 km | MPC · JPL |
| 244670 | 2003 KN_{18} | — | May 28, 2003 | Kitt Peak | Spacewatch | APO +1km | 830 m | MPC · JPL |
| 244671 | 2003 KN_{33} | — | May 27, 2003 | Kitt Peak | Spacewatch | EOS | 4.2 km | MPC · JPL |
| 244672 | 2003 MS_{3} | — | June 25, 2003 | Socorro | LINEAR | · | 1.1 km | MPC · JPL |
| 244673 | 2003 MM_{6} | — | June 25, 2003 | Socorro | LINEAR | · | 5.1 km | MPC · JPL |
| 244674 | 2003 NS_{5} | — | July 6, 2003 | Socorro | LINEAR | · | 6.0 km | MPC · JPL |
| 244675 | 2003 NC_{7} | — | July 7, 2003 | Reedy Creek | J. Broughton | · | 2.1 km | MPC · JPL |
| 244676 | 2003 NT_{7} | — | July 9, 2003 | Kitt Peak | Spacewatch | · | 2.2 km | MPC · JPL |
| 244677 | 2003 NR_{12} | — | July 8, 2003 | Palomar | NEAT | · | 1.8 km | MPC · JPL |
| 244678 | 2003 OY | — | July 20, 2003 | Socorro | LINEAR | · | 1.7 km | MPC · JPL |
| 244679 | 2003 OC_{8} | — | July 25, 2003 | Reedy Creek | J. Broughton | · | 1.6 km | MPC · JPL |
| 244680 | 2003 OG_{16} | — | July 25, 2003 | Socorro | LINEAR | · | 880 m | MPC · JPL |
| 244681 | 2003 OY_{17} | — | July 30, 2003 | Reedy Creek | J. Broughton | · | 1.9 km | MPC · JPL |
| 244682 | 2003 OG_{18} | — | July 28, 2003 | Haleakala | NEAT | · | 2.2 km | MPC · JPL |
| 244683 | 2003 OL_{19} | — | July 30, 2003 | Socorro | LINEAR | · | 1.4 km | MPC · JPL |
| 244684 | 2003 OH_{23} | — | July 28, 2003 | Bergisch Gladbach | W. Bickel | · | 1.9 km | MPC · JPL |
| 244685 | 2003 OY_{23} | — | July 24, 2003 | Palomar | NEAT | V | 950 m | MPC · JPL |
| 244686 | 2003 OL_{27} | — | July 24, 2003 | Palomar | NEAT | · | 2.1 km | MPC · JPL |
| 244687 | 2003 OD_{33} | — | July 25, 2003 | Socorro | LINEAR | · | 4.2 km | MPC · JPL |
| 244688 | 2003 OM_{33} | — | July 25, 2003 | Socorro | LINEAR | · | 1.9 km | MPC · JPL |
| 244689 | 2003 PW_{5} | — | August 1, 2003 | Socorro | LINEAR | · | 1.0 km | MPC · JPL |
| 244690 | 2003 PA_{7} | — | August 1, 2003 | Haleakala | NEAT | · | 2.1 km | MPC · JPL |
| 244691 | 2003 QZ | — | August 17, 2003 | Haleakala | NEAT | · | 1.5 km | MPC · JPL |
| 244692 | 2003 QA_{3} | — | August 19, 2003 | Campo Imperatore | CINEOS | · | 1.9 km | MPC · JPL |
| 244693 | 2003 QS_{3} | — | August 17, 2003 | Haleakala | NEAT | DOR | 3.0 km | MPC · JPL |
| 244694 | 2003 QQ_{5} | — | August 20, 2003 | Campo Imperatore | CINEOS | · | 1.3 km | MPC · JPL |
| 244695 | 2003 QN_{10} | — | August 21, 2003 | Socorro | LINEAR | PHO | 1.2 km | MPC · JPL |
| 244696 | 2003 QZ_{11} | — | August 21, 2003 | Campo Imperatore | CINEOS | NYS | 1.4 km | MPC · JPL |
| 244697 | 2003 QE_{15} | — | August 20, 2003 | Palomar | NEAT | · | 1.3 km | MPC · JPL |
| 244698 | 2003 QQ_{16} | — | August 20, 2003 | Campo Imperatore | CINEOS | · | 1.2 km | MPC · JPL |
| 244699 | 2003 QV_{20} | — | August 22, 2003 | Palomar | NEAT | THM | 5.9 km | MPC · JPL |
| 244700 | 2003 QJ_{21} | — | August 22, 2003 | Palomar | NEAT | NYS | 1.3 km | MPC · JPL |

== 244701–244800 ==
back to top

| Designation | | | Discovery | | | Properties | | Ref |
| Permanent | Provisional | Named after | Date | Site | Discoverer(s) | Category | Diam. | Ref |
|---|---|---|---|---|---|---|---|---|
| 244701 | 2003 QL_{21} | — | August 22, 2003 | Palomar | NEAT | · | 1.8 km | MPC · JPL |
| 244702 | 2003 QQ_{23} | — | August 21, 2003 | Campo Imperatore | CINEOS | PHO | 1.2 km | MPC · JPL |
| 244703 | 2003 QS_{23} | — | August 21, 2003 | Campo Imperatore | CINEOS | · | 1.8 km | MPC · JPL |
| 244704 | 2003 QM_{26} | — | August 22, 2003 | Haleakala | NEAT | · | 2.5 km | MPC · JPL |
| 244705 | 2003 QN_{29} | — | August 23, 2003 | Črni Vrh | Skvarč, J. | EUN | 1.5 km | MPC · JPL |
| 244706 | 2003 QJ_{35} | — | August 22, 2003 | Palomar | NEAT | MAS | 950 m | MPC · JPL |
| 244707 | 2003 QD_{36} | — | August 22, 2003 | Socorro | LINEAR | NYS | 1.6 km | MPC · JPL |
| 244708 | 2003 QM_{43} | — | August 22, 2003 | Palomar | NEAT | · | 1.6 km | MPC · JPL |
| 244709 | 2003 QN_{46} | — | August 23, 2003 | Palomar | NEAT | · | 3.0 km | MPC · JPL |
| 244710 | 2003 QL_{51} | — | August 22, 2003 | Haleakala | NEAT | H | 740 m | MPC · JPL |
| 244711 | 2003 QS_{51} | — | August 23, 2003 | Palomar | NEAT | · | 1.5 km | MPC · JPL |
| 244712 | 2003 QT_{52} | — | August 23, 2003 | Socorro | LINEAR | MAS | 1.1 km | MPC · JPL |
| 244713 | 2003 QZ_{52} | — | August 23, 2003 | Socorro | LINEAR | · | 2.1 km | MPC · JPL |
| 244714 | 2003 QF_{55} | — | August 23, 2003 | Socorro | LINEAR | · | 2.7 km | MPC · JPL |
| 244715 | 2003 QW_{55} | — | August 23, 2003 | Socorro | LINEAR | · | 1.7 km | MPC · JPL |
| 244716 | 2003 QF_{68} | — | August 25, 2003 | Socorro | LINEAR | V | 930 m | MPC · JPL |
| 244717 | 2003 QL_{69} | — | August 25, 2003 | Palomar | NEAT | · | 5.6 km | MPC · JPL |
| 244718 | 2003 QS_{76} | — | August 24, 2003 | Socorro | LINEAR | PHO | 2.8 km | MPC · JPL |
| 244719 | 2003 QP_{78} | — | August 24, 2003 | Socorro | LINEAR | · | 2.4 km | MPC · JPL |
| 244720 | 2003 QZ_{81} | — | August 23, 2003 | Palomar | NEAT | · | 3.4 km | MPC · JPL |
| 244721 | 2003 QB_{85} | — | August 24, 2003 | Socorro | LINEAR | · | 2.5 km | MPC · JPL |
| 244722 | 2003 QN_{85} | — | August 24, 2003 | Palomar | NEAT | V | 1.1 km | MPC · JPL |
| 244723 | 2003 QL_{99} | — | August 30, 2003 | Haleakala | NEAT | · | 1.0 km | MPC · JPL |
| 244724 | 2003 QV_{99} | — | August 28, 2003 | Socorro | LINEAR | · | 1.9 km | MPC · JPL |
| 244725 | 2003 QC_{107} | — | August 31, 2003 | Socorro | LINEAR | MAS | 1.1 km | MPC · JPL |
| 244726 | 2003 QG_{107} | — | August 31, 2003 | Socorro | LINEAR | (2076) | 1.5 km | MPC · JPL |
| 244727 | 2003 QX_{114} | — | August 21, 2003 | Campo Imperatore | CINEOS | NYS | 1.1 km | MPC · JPL |
| 244728 | 2003 RU_{5} | — | September 4, 2003 | Črni Vrh | Skvarč, J. | ERI | 1.4 km | MPC · JPL |
| 244729 | 2003 RQ_{9} | — | September 4, 2003 | Socorro | LINEAR | · | 3.7 km | MPC · JPL |
| 244730 | 2003 RB_{12} | — | September 13, 2003 | Haleakala | NEAT | · | 1.6 km | MPC · JPL |
| 244731 | 2003 RT_{12} | — | September 14, 2003 | Haleakala | NEAT | · | 1.2 km | MPC · JPL |
| 244732 | 2003 RJ_{14} | — | September 14, 2003 | Haleakala | NEAT | PHO | 2.7 km | MPC · JPL |
| 244733 | 2003 RT_{17} | — | September 15, 2003 | Palomar | NEAT | · | 5.5 km | MPC · JPL |
| 244734 | 2003 RH_{22} | — | September 15, 2003 | Haleakala | NEAT | · | 3.0 km | MPC · JPL |
| 244735 | 2003 RW_{22} | — | September 3, 2003 | Socorro | LINEAR | · | 2.7 km | MPC · JPL |
| 244736 | 2003 ST_{10} | — | September 17, 2003 | Kitt Peak | Spacewatch | · | 4.1 km | MPC · JPL |
| 244737 | 2003 SP_{12} | — | September 16, 2003 | Kitt Peak | Spacewatch | · | 3.3 km | MPC · JPL |
| 244738 | 2003 SL_{26} | — | September 17, 2003 | Haleakala | NEAT | · | 2.1 km | MPC · JPL |
| 244739 | 2003 SY_{27} | — | September 18, 2003 | Palomar | NEAT | · | 1.2 km | MPC · JPL |
| 244740 | 2003 SR_{31} | — | September 18, 2003 | Kitt Peak | Spacewatch | MAS | 830 m | MPC · JPL |
| 244741 | 2003 SY_{33} | — | September 18, 2003 | Socorro | LINEAR | · | 1.6 km | MPC · JPL |
| 244742 | 2003 SV_{35} | — | September 17, 2003 | Haleakala | NEAT | · | 1.4 km | MPC · JPL |
| 244743 | 2003 SP_{39} | — | September 16, 2003 | Palomar | NEAT | · | 1.5 km | MPC · JPL |
| 244744 | 2003 SG_{40} | — | September 16, 2003 | Palomar | NEAT | · | 2.6 km | MPC · JPL |
| 244745 | 2003 SF_{44} | — | September 16, 2003 | Anderson Mesa | LONEOS | · | 1.8 km | MPC · JPL |
| 244746 | 2003 SE_{46} | — | September 16, 2003 | Anderson Mesa | LONEOS | · | 2.9 km | MPC · JPL |
| 244747 | 2003 SU_{46} | — | September 16, 2003 | Anderson Mesa | LONEOS | · | 1.5 km | MPC · JPL |
| 244748 | 2003 SU_{52} | — | September 19, 2003 | Palomar | NEAT | · | 1.5 km | MPC · JPL |
| 244749 | 2003 SJ_{54} | — | September 16, 2003 | Anderson Mesa | LONEOS | (194) | 2.5 km | MPC · JPL |
| 244750 | 2003 SS_{56} | — | September 16, 2003 | Kitt Peak | Spacewatch | · | 1.4 km | MPC · JPL |
| 244751 | 2003 SZ_{57} | — | September 16, 2003 | Kitt Peak | Spacewatch | · | 2.4 km | MPC · JPL |
| 244752 | 2003 SN_{61} | — | September 17, 2003 | Socorro | LINEAR | · | 1.4 km | MPC · JPL |
| 244753 | 2003 SC_{62} | — | September 17, 2003 | Socorro | LINEAR | · | 1.6 km | MPC · JPL |
| 244754 | 2003 SE_{62} | — | September 17, 2003 | Kitt Peak | Spacewatch | · | 2.8 km | MPC · JPL |
| 244755 | 2003 SF_{66} | — | September 18, 2003 | Socorro | LINEAR | · | 1.4 km | MPC · JPL |
| 244756 | 2003 SZ_{80} | — | September 19, 2003 | Kitt Peak | Spacewatch | KOR | 1.6 km | MPC · JPL |
| 244757 | 2003 SJ_{82} | — | September 17, 2003 | Kitt Peak | Spacewatch | · | 2.3 km | MPC · JPL |
| 244758 | 2003 SF_{84} | — | September 20, 2003 | Socorro | LINEAR | · | 2.1 km | MPC · JPL |
| 244759 | 2003 SS_{85} | — | September 16, 2003 | Palomar | NEAT | · | 3.2 km | MPC · JPL |
| 244760 | 2003 ST_{89} | — | September 18, 2003 | Palomar | NEAT | · | 3.4 km | MPC · JPL |
| 244761 | 2003 SD_{98} | — | September 19, 2003 | Kitt Peak | Spacewatch | MAS | 1.1 km | MPC · JPL |
| 244762 | 2003 SY_{98} | — | September 19, 2003 | Haleakala | NEAT | · | 4.3 km | MPC · JPL |
| 244763 | 2003 SD_{102} | — | September 20, 2003 | Socorro | LINEAR | · | 2.1 km | MPC · JPL |
| 244764 | 2003 SO_{108} | — | September 20, 2003 | Palomar | NEAT | · | 2.0 km | MPC · JPL |
| 244765 | 2003 SZ_{110} | — | September 20, 2003 | Kitt Peak | Spacewatch | · | 1.3 km | MPC · JPL |
| 244766 | 2003 SF_{117} | — | September 16, 2003 | Kitt Peak | Spacewatch | · | 2.2 km | MPC · JPL |
| 244767 | 2003 SK_{118} | — | September 16, 2003 | Palomar | NEAT | · | 1.3 km | MPC · JPL |
| 244768 | 2003 SP_{126} | — | September 19, 2003 | Haleakala | NEAT | · | 2.0 km | MPC · JPL |
| 244769 | 2003 SR_{131} | — | September 18, 2003 | Kitt Peak | Spacewatch | · | 1.6 km | MPC · JPL |
| 244770 | 2003 SL_{134} | — | September 18, 2003 | Palomar | NEAT | · | 3.3 km | MPC · JPL |
| 244771 | 2003 SH_{135} | — | September 19, 2003 | Kitt Peak | Spacewatch | · | 2.8 km | MPC · JPL |
| 244772 | 2003 SY_{142} | — | September 20, 2003 | Socorro | LINEAR | (2076) | 1.5 km | MPC · JPL |
| 244773 | 2003 SL_{144} | — | September 19, 2003 | Palomar | NEAT | EUN | 1.9 km | MPC · JPL |
| 244774 | 2003 SZ_{146} | — | September 20, 2003 | Palomar | NEAT | · | 2.1 km | MPC · JPL |
| 244775 | 2003 SJ_{149} | — | September 16, 2003 | Kitt Peak | Spacewatch | · | 1.5 km | MPC · JPL |
| 244776 | 2003 SM_{152} | — | September 19, 2003 | Anderson Mesa | LONEOS | GEF | 2.4 km | MPC · JPL |
| 244777 | 2003 SR_{161} | — | September 18, 2003 | Palomar | NEAT | · | 1.5 km | MPC · JPL |
| 244778 | 2003 SA_{167} | — | September 22, 2003 | Desert Eagle | W. K. Y. Yeung | NYS | 1.5 km | MPC · JPL |
| 244779 | 2003 SU_{167} | — | September 22, 2003 | Haleakala | NEAT | · | 1.4 km | MPC · JPL |
| 244780 | 2003 SY_{169} | — | September 23, 2003 | Haleakala | NEAT | · | 2.4 km | MPC · JPL |
| 244781 | 2003 SX_{173} | — | September 18, 2003 | Socorro | LINEAR | · | 2.0 km | MPC · JPL |
| 244782 | 2003 SY_{178} | — | September 19, 2003 | Kitt Peak | Spacewatch | · | 1.3 km | MPC · JPL |
| 244783 | 2003 SZ_{181} | — | September 20, 2003 | Socorro | LINEAR | · | 4.5 km | MPC · JPL |
| 244784 | 2003 SN_{189} | — | September 22, 2003 | Kitt Peak | Spacewatch | · | 2.8 km | MPC · JPL |
| 244785 | 2003 SJ_{195} | — | September 20, 2003 | Palomar | NEAT | · | 4.2 km | MPC · JPL |
| 244786 | 2003 SD_{197} | — | September 21, 2003 | Anderson Mesa | LONEOS | H | 860 m | MPC · JPL |
| 244787 | 2003 SX_{197} | — | September 21, 2003 | Anderson Mesa | LONEOS | · | 3.9 km | MPC · JPL |
| 244788 | 2003 SN_{204} | — | September 22, 2003 | Socorro | LINEAR | · | 6.5 km | MPC · JPL |
| 244789 | 2003 SV_{209} | — | September 25, 2003 | Haleakala | NEAT | · | 1.8 km | MPC · JPL |
| 244790 | 2003 SQ_{210} | — | September 23, 2003 | Palomar | NEAT | · | 1.1 km | MPC · JPL |
| 244791 | 2003 SV_{212} | — | September 25, 2003 | Haleakala | NEAT | V | 1.0 km | MPC · JPL |
| 244792 | 2003 SG_{215} | — | September 18, 2003 | Kitt Peak | Spacewatch | · | 2.6 km | MPC · JPL |
| 244793 | 2003 SW_{218} | — | September 28, 2003 | Desert Eagle | W. K. Y. Yeung | · | 5.9 km | MPC · JPL |
| 244794 | 2003 SM_{233} | — | September 25, 2003 | Palomar | NEAT | ERI | 2.0 km | MPC · JPL |
| 244795 | 2003 SL_{234} | — | September 25, 2003 | Palomar | NEAT | · | 4.6 km | MPC · JPL |
| 244796 | 2003 SS_{245} | — | September 26, 2003 | Socorro | LINEAR | · | 2.4 km | MPC · JPL |
| 244797 | 2003 SZ_{245} | — | September 26, 2003 | Socorro | LINEAR | · | 3.2 km | MPC · JPL |
| 244798 | 2003 ST_{246} | — | September 26, 2003 | Socorro | LINEAR | · | 3.2 km | MPC · JPL |
| 244799 | 2003 SX_{251} | — | September 26, 2003 | Socorro | LINEAR | · | 3.4 km | MPC · JPL |
| 244800 | 2003 SO_{252} | — | September 26, 2003 | Socorro | LINEAR | · | 2.1 km | MPC · JPL |

== 244801–244900 ==
back to top

| Designation | | | Discovery | | | Properties | | Ref |
| Permanent | Provisional | Named after | Date | Site | Discoverer(s) | Category | Diam. | Ref |
|---|---|---|---|---|---|---|---|---|
| 244801 | 2003 SW_{263} | — | September 28, 2003 | Socorro | LINEAR | EUN | 1.4 km | MPC · JPL |
| 244802 | 2003 SL_{266} | — | September 29, 2003 | Socorro | LINEAR | · | 1.9 km | MPC · JPL |
| 244803 | 2003 SJ_{269} | — | September 20, 2003 | Bergisch Gladbach | W. Bickel | AGN · | 1.5 km | MPC · JPL |
| 244804 | 2003 SJ_{273} | — | September 27, 2003 | Kitt Peak | Spacewatch | BAR | 1.5 km | MPC · JPL |
| 244805 | 2003 SQ_{273} | — | September 28, 2003 | Kitt Peak | Spacewatch | · | 2.7 km | MPC · JPL |
| 244806 | 2003 SU_{275} | — | September 29, 2003 | Socorro | LINEAR | · | 2.7 km | MPC · JPL |
| 244807 | 2003 SG_{283} | — | September 20, 2003 | Socorro | LINEAR | EUN | 2.1 km | MPC · JPL |
| 244808 | 2003 SP_{286} | — | September 21, 2003 | Palomar | NEAT | · | 1.1 km | MPC · JPL |
| 244809 | 2003 ST_{295} | — | September 29, 2003 | Anderson Mesa | LONEOS | · | 2.6 km | MPC · JPL |
| 244810 | 2003 SG_{309} | — | September 27, 2003 | Socorro | LINEAR | WIT | 1.4 km | MPC · JPL |
| 244811 | 2003 ST_{309} | — | September 27, 2003 | Socorro | LINEAR | · | 5.9 km | MPC · JPL |
| 244812 | 2003 ST_{319} | — | September 28, 2003 | Socorro | LINEAR | · | 3.6 km | MPC · JPL |
| 244813 | 2003 SG_{324} | — | September 17, 2003 | Kitt Peak | Spacewatch | · | 1.7 km | MPC · JPL |
| 244814 | 2003 ST_{326} | — | September 18, 2003 | Kitt Peak | Spacewatch | · | 1.5 km | MPC · JPL |
| 244815 | 2003 SL_{328} | — | September 20, 2003 | Anderson Mesa | LONEOS | · | 3.0 km | MPC · JPL |
| 244816 | 2003 SY_{332} | — | September 30, 2003 | Kitt Peak | Spacewatch | · | 1.7 km | MPC · JPL |
| 244817 | 2003 SV_{339} | — | September 26, 2003 | Apache Point | SDSS | · | 4.0 km | MPC · JPL |
| 244818 | 2003 ST_{399} | — | September 26, 2003 | Apache Point | SDSS | · | 4.5 km | MPC · JPL |
| 244819 | 2003 TA_{3} | — | October 1, 2003 | Kitt Peak | Spacewatch | · | 2.6 km | MPC · JPL |
| 244820 | 2003 TA_{4} | — | October 2, 2003 | Kitt Peak | Spacewatch | · | 2.5 km | MPC · JPL |
| 244821 | 2003 TJ_{6} | — | October 1, 2003 | Anderson Mesa | LONEOS | · | 1.4 km | MPC · JPL |
| 244822 | 2003 TS_{43} | — | October 2, 2003 | Kitt Peak | Spacewatch | · | 1.8 km | MPC · JPL |
| 244823 | 2003 TR_{49} | — | October 3, 2003 | Kitt Peak | Spacewatch | · | 1.9 km | MPC · JPL |
| 244824 | 2003 TV_{53} | — | October 5, 2003 | Kitt Peak | Spacewatch | · | 2.0 km | MPC · JPL |
| 244825 | 2003 UX_{4} | — | October 17, 2003 | Socorro | LINEAR | · | 4.3 km | MPC · JPL |
| 244826 | 2003 US_{11} | — | October 20, 2003 | Socorro | LINEAR | H | 800 m | MPC · JPL |
| 244827 | 2003 UL_{13} | — | October 18, 2003 | Palomar | NEAT | H | 760 m | MPC · JPL |
| 244828 | 2003 UM_{28} | — | October 19, 2003 | Kitt Peak | Spacewatch | THM | 3.6 km | MPC · JPL |
| 244829 | 2003 UC_{40} | — | October 16, 2003 | Kitt Peak | Spacewatch | · | 1.6 km | MPC · JPL |
| 244830 | 2003 UJ_{41} | — | October 16, 2003 | Haleakala | NEAT | · | 1.4 km | MPC · JPL |
| 244831 | 2003 UX_{42} | — | October 17, 2003 | Kitt Peak | Spacewatch | · | 4.6 km | MPC · JPL |
| 244832 | 2003 UC_{44} | — | October 18, 2003 | Kitt Peak | Spacewatch | MAS | 870 m | MPC · JPL |
| 244833 | 2003 UW_{49} | — | October 16, 2003 | Palomar | NEAT | MAR | 1.6 km | MPC · JPL |
| 244834 | 2003 UA_{58} | — | October 16, 2003 | Palomar | NEAT | · | 2.8 km | MPC · JPL |
| 244835 | 2003 UG_{62} | — | October 16, 2003 | Anderson Mesa | LONEOS | V | 1.1 km | MPC · JPL |
| 244836 | 2003 UO_{82} | — | October 19, 2003 | Palomar | NEAT | · | 3.4 km | MPC · JPL |
| 244837 | 2003 UT_{91} | — | October 20, 2003 | Kitt Peak | Spacewatch | · | 2.1 km | MPC · JPL |
| 244838 | 2003 UF_{102} | — | October 20, 2003 | Socorro | LINEAR | · | 1.5 km | MPC · JPL |
| 244839 | 2003 UY_{102} | — | October 20, 2003 | Kitt Peak | Spacewatch | · | 2.5 km | MPC · JPL |
| 244840 | 2003 UU_{106} | — | October 18, 2003 | Palomar | NEAT | · | 2.0 km | MPC · JPL |
| 244841 | 2003 UP_{107} | — | October 19, 2003 | Kitt Peak | Spacewatch | · | 2.5 km | MPC · JPL |
| 244842 | 2003 UP_{113} | — | October 20, 2003 | Socorro | LINEAR | KON | 3.5 km | MPC · JPL |
| 244843 | 2003 UC_{123} | — | October 19, 2003 | Kitt Peak | Spacewatch | · | 1.7 km | MPC · JPL |
| 244844 | 2003 UD_{124} | — | October 20, 2003 | Palomar | NEAT | EUN | 2.8 km | MPC · JPL |
| 244845 | 2003 UM_{124} | — | October 20, 2003 | Kitt Peak | Spacewatch | · | 2.6 km | MPC · JPL |
| 244846 | 2003 UP_{128} | — | October 21, 2003 | Kitt Peak | Spacewatch | LUT | 4.2 km | MPC · JPL |
| 244847 | 2003 UR_{134} | — | October 20, 2003 | Palomar | NEAT | · | 2.7 km | MPC · JPL |
| 244848 | 2003 UN_{135} | — | October 21, 2003 | Palomar | NEAT | EUN | 1.9 km | MPC · JPL |
| 244849 | 2003 UY_{137} | — | October 21, 2003 | Socorro | LINEAR | · | 1.4 km | MPC · JPL |
| 244850 | 2003 UH_{140} | — | October 16, 2003 | Anderson Mesa | LONEOS | · | 2.8 km | MPC · JPL |
| 244851 | 2003 US_{143} | — | October 18, 2003 | Anderson Mesa | LONEOS | · | 1.4 km | MPC · JPL |
| 244852 | 2003 UG_{145} | — | October 18, 2003 | Anderson Mesa | LONEOS | · | 1.9 km | MPC · JPL |
| 244853 | 2003 UB_{148} | — | October 19, 2003 | Socorro | LINEAR | · | 4.7 km | MPC · JPL |
| 244854 | 2003 UE_{150} | — | October 20, 2003 | Socorro | LINEAR | · | 3.6 km | MPC · JPL |
| 244855 | 2003 UT_{152} | — | October 21, 2003 | Socorro | LINEAR | · | 2.0 km | MPC · JPL |
| 244856 | 2003 UK_{169} | — | October 22, 2003 | Socorro | LINEAR | PHO | 3.8 km | MPC · JPL |
| 244857 | 2003 UQ_{170} | — | October 22, 2003 | Kitt Peak | Spacewatch | · | 4.3 km | MPC · JPL |
| 244858 | 2003 UC_{173} | — | October 20, 2003 | Palomar | NEAT | · | 1.5 km | MPC · JPL |
| 244859 | 2003 UA_{194} | — | October 20, 2003 | Socorro | LINEAR | · | 2.2 km | MPC · JPL |
| 244860 | 2003 UG_{195} | — | October 20, 2003 | Kitt Peak | Spacewatch | · | 1.8 km | MPC · JPL |
| 244861 | 2003 UK_{196} | — | October 21, 2003 | Kitt Peak | Spacewatch | · | 2.0 km | MPC · JPL |
| 244862 | 2003 UR_{201} | — | October 21, 2003 | Socorro | LINEAR | (5) | 2.1 km | MPC · JPL |
| 244863 | 2003 UO_{208} | — | October 22, 2003 | Kitt Peak | Spacewatch | · | 2.3 km | MPC · JPL |
| 244864 | 2003 UK_{217} | — | October 21, 2003 | Socorro | LINEAR | NYS | 2.7 km | MPC · JPL |
| 244865 | 2003 UM_{217} | — | October 21, 2003 | Socorro | LINEAR | · | 2.9 km | MPC · JPL |
| 244866 | 2003 UT_{219} | — | October 21, 2003 | Socorro | LINEAR | NEM | 2.9 km | MPC · JPL |
| 244867 | 2003 UE_{222} | — | October 22, 2003 | Palomar | NEAT | · | 3.7 km | MPC · JPL |
| 244868 | 2003 UL_{222} | — | October 22, 2003 | Socorro | LINEAR | · | 3.6 km | MPC · JPL |
| 244869 | 2003 UW_{237} | — | October 23, 2003 | Kitt Peak | Spacewatch | · | 1.7 km | MPC · JPL |
| 244870 | 2003 UU_{240} | — | October 24, 2003 | Kitt Peak | Spacewatch | · | 2.4 km | MPC · JPL |
| 244871 | 2003 UK_{243} | — | October 24, 2003 | Socorro | LINEAR | · | 1.4 km | MPC · JPL |
| 244872 | 2003 UC_{244} | — | October 24, 2003 | Socorro | LINEAR | · | 2.4 km | MPC · JPL |
| 244873 | 2003 UD_{246} | — | October 24, 2003 | Kitt Peak | Spacewatch | · | 3.1 km | MPC · JPL |
| 244874 | 2003 US_{259} | — | October 25, 2003 | Socorro | LINEAR | EUN | 1.9 km | MPC · JPL |
| 244875 | 2003 UQ_{272} | — | October 29, 2003 | Kitt Peak | Spacewatch | DOR | 3.3 km | MPC · JPL |
| 244876 | 2003 UX_{273} | — | October 29, 2003 | Socorro | LINEAR | · | 6.0 km | MPC · JPL |
| 244877 | 2003 UT_{275} | — | October 29, 2003 | Socorro | LINEAR | MRX | 1.4 km | MPC · JPL |
| 244878 | 2003 UH_{276} | — | October 29, 2003 | Catalina | CSS | T_{j} (2.98) · 3:2 | 7.9 km | MPC · JPL |
| 244879 | 2003 UR_{281} | — | October 29, 2003 | Anderson Mesa | LONEOS | GEF | 1.9 km | MPC · JPL |
| 244880 | 2003 UR_{285} | — | October 22, 2003 | Kitt Peak | M. W. Buie | KOR | 1.2 km | MPC · JPL |
| 244881 | 2003 UJ_{316} | — | October 23, 2003 | Kitt Peak | Spacewatch | EUN | 1.3 km | MPC · JPL |
| 244882 | 2003 UC_{365} | — | October 20, 2003 | Kitt Peak | Spacewatch | · | 2.1 km | MPC · JPL |
| 244883 | 2003 UU_{378} | — | October 22, 2003 | Apache Point | SDSS | · | 1.3 km | MPC · JPL |
| 244884 | 2003 UD_{400} | — | October 22, 2003 | Kitt Peak | Spacewatch | · | 2.0 km | MPC · JPL |
| 244885 | 2003 VT | — | November 5, 2003 | Socorro | LINEAR | H | 910 m | MPC · JPL |
| 244886 | 2003 VK_{11} | — | November 15, 2003 | Palomar | NEAT | · | 3.8 km | MPC · JPL |
| 244887 | 2003 WO_{3} | — | November 16, 2003 | Catalina | CSS | · | 1.9 km | MPC · JPL |
| 244888 Bunton | 2003 WC_{13} | Bunton | November 19, 2003 | Mauna Kea | J. Pittichová, J. Bedient | · | 1.5 km | MPC · JPL |
| 244889 | 2003 WB_{17} | — | November 18, 2003 | Palomar | NEAT | · | 1.9 km | MPC · JPL |
| 244890 | 2003 WN_{30} | — | November 18, 2003 | Kitt Peak | Spacewatch | (5) | 1.9 km | MPC · JPL |
| 244891 | 2003 WP_{30} | — | November 18, 2003 | Kitt Peak | Spacewatch | · | 2.0 km | MPC · JPL |
| 244892 | 2003 WQ_{35} | — | November 19, 2003 | Palomar | NEAT | · | 2.9 km | MPC · JPL |
| 244893 | 2003 WY_{39} | — | November 19, 2003 | Kitt Peak | Spacewatch | · | 2.7 km | MPC · JPL |
| 244894 | 2003 WV_{44} | — | November 19, 2003 | Palomar | NEAT | · | 3.2 km | MPC · JPL |
| 244895 | 2003 WZ_{56} | — | November 18, 2003 | Palomar | NEAT | · | 4.8 km | MPC · JPL |
| 244896 | 2003 WO_{58} | — | November 18, 2003 | Kitt Peak | Spacewatch | · | 4.0 km | MPC · JPL |
| 244897 | 2003 WO_{72} | — | November 20, 2003 | Socorro | LINEAR | · | 3.1 km | MPC · JPL |
| 244898 | 2003 WU_{72} | — | November 20, 2003 | Socorro | LINEAR | NEM | 2.8 km | MPC · JPL |
| 244899 | 2003 WU_{77} | — | November 20, 2003 | Socorro | LINEAR | H | 900 m | MPC · JPL |
| 244900 | 2003 WC_{82} | — | November 19, 2003 | Socorro | LINEAR | · | 5.2 km | MPC · JPL |

== 244901–245000 ==
back to top

| Designation | | | Discovery | | | Properties | | Ref |
| Permanent | Provisional | Named after | Date | Site | Discoverer(s) | Category | Diam. | Ref |
|---|---|---|---|---|---|---|---|---|
| 244901 | 2003 WO_{86} | — | November 21, 2003 | Socorro | LINEAR | HNS | 1.6 km | MPC · JPL |
| 244902 | 2003 WQ_{87} | — | November 22, 2003 | Catalina | CSS | JUN | 1.5 km | MPC · JPL |
| 244903 | 2003 WL_{95} | — | November 19, 2003 | Anderson Mesa | LONEOS | · | 2.0 km | MPC · JPL |
| 244904 | 2003 WZ_{97} | — | November 19, 2003 | Anderson Mesa | LONEOS | · | 2.6 km | MPC · JPL |
| 244905 | 2003 WJ_{120} | — | November 20, 2003 | Socorro | LINEAR | · | 2.8 km | MPC · JPL |
| 244906 | 2003 WY_{121} | — | November 20, 2003 | Socorro | LINEAR | (5) | 2.3 km | MPC · JPL |
| 244907 | 2003 WP_{125} | — | November 20, 2003 | Socorro | LINEAR | · | 2.6 km | MPC · JPL |
| 244908 | 2003 WC_{129} | — | November 21, 2003 | Socorro | LINEAR | · | 3.6 km | MPC · JPL |
| 244909 | 2003 WN_{131} | — | November 21, 2003 | Palomar | NEAT | · | 2.2 km | MPC · JPL |
| 244910 | 2003 WQ_{132} | — | November 20, 2003 | Socorro | LINEAR | · | 1.8 km | MPC · JPL |
| 244911 | 2003 WU_{133} | — | November 21, 2003 | Socorro | LINEAR | · | 3.1 km | MPC · JPL |
| 244912 | 2003 WC_{135} | — | November 21, 2003 | Socorro | LINEAR | · | 1.5 km | MPC · JPL |
| 244913 | 2003 WU_{135} | — | November 21, 2003 | Socorro | LINEAR | · | 2.7 km | MPC · JPL |
| 244914 | 2003 WK_{140} | — | November 21, 2003 | Socorro | LINEAR | · | 2.3 km | MPC · JPL |
| 244915 | 2003 WL_{141} | — | November 21, 2003 | Socorro | LINEAR | · | 2.4 km | MPC · JPL |
| 244916 | 2003 WV_{144} | — | November 21, 2003 | Socorro | LINEAR | · | 3.2 km | MPC · JPL |
| 244917 | 2003 WB_{155} | — | November 26, 2003 | Kitt Peak | Spacewatch | · | 1.7 km | MPC · JPL |
| 244918 | 2003 WK_{155} | — | November 26, 2003 | Kitt Peak | Spacewatch | · | 3.8 km | MPC · JPL |
| 244919 | 2003 WN_{159} | — | November 29, 2003 | Socorro | LINEAR | · | 1.8 km | MPC · JPL |
| 244920 | 2003 WB_{164} | — | November 30, 2003 | Kitt Peak | Spacewatch | · | 1.7 km | MPC · JPL |
| 244921 | 2003 WU_{165} | — | November 30, 2003 | Kitt Peak | Spacewatch | 3:2 | 7.2 km | MPC · JPL |
| 244922 | 2003 WY_{166} | — | November 18, 2003 | Palomar | NEAT | · | 7.0 km | MPC · JPL |
| 244923 | 2003 WA_{170} | — | November 20, 2003 | Palomar | NEAT | · | 3.4 km | MPC · JPL |
| 244924 | 2003 WK_{175} | — | November 19, 2003 | Kitt Peak | Spacewatch | · | 1.7 km | MPC · JPL |
| 244925 | 2003 WH_{183} | — | November 23, 2003 | Kitt Peak | M. W. Buie | · | 3.4 km | MPC · JPL |
| 244926 | 2003 WN_{190} | — | November 26, 2003 | Socorro | LINEAR | H | 840 m | MPC · JPL |
| 244927 | 2003 WE_{194} | — | November 24, 2003 | Kitt Peak | Spacewatch | · | 2.4 km | MPC · JPL |
| 244928 | 2003 XY_{1} | — | December 1, 2003 | Socorro | LINEAR | · | 4.3 km | MPC · JPL |
| 244929 | 2003 XB_{20} | — | December 14, 2003 | Kitt Peak | Spacewatch | · | 5.7 km | MPC · JPL |
| 244930 | 2003 XC_{20} | — | December 14, 2003 | Kitt Peak | Spacewatch | EOS | 2.8 km | MPC · JPL |
| 244931 | 2003 XM_{20} | — | December 15, 2003 | Socorro | LINEAR | · | 2.7 km | MPC · JPL |
| 244932 Méliès | 2003 XW_{21} | Méliès | December 15, 2003 | Saint-Sulpice | B. Christophe | · | 2.4 km | MPC · JPL |
| 244933 | 2003 YF_{3} | — | December 18, 2003 | Socorro | LINEAR | · | 3.6 km | MPC · JPL |
| 244934 | 2003 YQ_{6} | — | December 17, 2003 | Anderson Mesa | LONEOS | · | 4.2 km | MPC · JPL |
| 244935 | 2003 YA_{9} | — | December 20, 2003 | Socorro | LINEAR | H | 840 m | MPC · JPL |
| 244936 | 2003 YR_{14} | — | December 17, 2003 | Socorro | LINEAR | · | 4.0 km | MPC · JPL |
| 244937 | 2003 YZ_{25} | — | December 18, 2003 | Socorro | LINEAR | · | 2.3 km | MPC · JPL |
| 244938 | 2003 YY_{33} | — | December 17, 2003 | Anderson Mesa | LONEOS | · | 2.3 km | MPC · JPL |
| 244939 | 2003 YV_{49} | — | December 18, 2003 | Socorro | LINEAR | · | 2.5 km | MPC · JPL |
| 244940 | 2003 YL_{53} | — | December 19, 2003 | Socorro | LINEAR | · | 3.4 km | MPC · JPL |
| 244941 | 2003 YC_{54} | — | December 19, 2003 | Kitt Peak | Spacewatch | · | 1.5 km | MPC · JPL |
| 244942 | 2003 YT_{69} | — | December 21, 2003 | Kitt Peak | Spacewatch | (5) | 1.6 km | MPC · JPL |
| 244943 | 2003 YU_{77} | — | December 18, 2003 | Socorro | LINEAR | · | 4.5 km | MPC · JPL |
| 244944 | 2003 YQ_{78} | — | December 18, 2003 | Socorro | LINEAR | PHO | 4.4 km | MPC · JPL |
| 244945 | 2003 YE_{80} | — | December 18, 2003 | Socorro | LINEAR | · | 2.4 km | MPC · JPL |
| 244946 | 2003 YZ_{80} | — | December 18, 2003 | Socorro | LINEAR | · | 3.1 km | MPC · JPL |
| 244947 | 2003 YP_{81} | — | December 18, 2003 | Socorro | LINEAR | · | 1.4 km | MPC · JPL |
| 244948 | 2003 YX_{82} | — | December 18, 2003 | Kitt Peak | Spacewatch | · | 3.0 km | MPC · JPL |
| 244949 | 2003 YF_{95} | — | December 19, 2003 | Socorro | LINEAR | · | 4.8 km | MPC · JPL |
| 244950 | 2003 YK_{97} | — | December 19, 2003 | Socorro | LINEAR | · | 2.6 km | MPC · JPL |
| 244951 | 2003 YH_{106} | — | December 22, 2003 | Socorro | LINEAR | · | 3.3 km | MPC · JPL |
| 244952 | 2003 YH_{112} | — | December 23, 2003 | Socorro | LINEAR | · | 4.7 km | MPC · JPL |
| 244953 | 2003 YX_{113} | — | December 24, 2003 | Socorro | LINEAR | EUN | 1.7 km | MPC · JPL |
| 244954 | 2003 YZ_{136} | — | December 27, 2003 | Socorro | LINEAR | · | 2.2 km | MPC · JPL |
| 244955 | 2003 YE_{137} | — | December 27, 2003 | Kitt Peak | Spacewatch | · | 3.5 km | MPC · JPL |
| 244956 | 2003 YW_{140} | — | December 28, 2003 | Socorro | LINEAR | · | 3.7 km | MPC · JPL |
| 244957 | 2003 YS_{141} | — | December 28, 2003 | Socorro | LINEAR | · | 3.9 km | MPC · JPL |
| 244958 | 2003 YB_{144} | — | December 28, 2003 | Socorro | LINEAR | · | 2.8 km | MPC · JPL |
| 244959 | 2003 YO_{145} | — | December 28, 2003 | Socorro | LINEAR | LIX | 4.3 km | MPC · JPL |
| 244960 | 2003 YW_{148} | — | December 29, 2003 | Socorro | LINEAR | CYB | 6.5 km | MPC · JPL |
| 244961 | 2003 YJ_{150} | — | December 29, 2003 | Socorro | LINEAR | EOS | 3.0 km | MPC · JPL |
| 244962 | 2003 YT_{157} | — | December 17, 2003 | Kitt Peak | Spacewatch | · | 2.6 km | MPC · JPL |
| 244963 | 2003 YO_{170} | — | December 18, 2003 | Kitt Peak | Spacewatch | · | 2.6 km | MPC · JPL |
| 244964 | 2004 AT_{7} | — | January 13, 2004 | Anderson Mesa | LONEOS | H | 820 m | MPC · JPL |
| 244965 | 2004 AL_{19} | — | January 15, 2004 | Kitt Peak | Spacewatch | · | 2.1 km | MPC · JPL |
| 244966 | 2004 BC_{1} | — | January 16, 2004 | Kitt Peak | Spacewatch | · | 1.7 km | MPC · JPL |
| 244967 | 2004 BA_{17} | — | January 17, 2004 | Palomar | NEAT | · | 5.1 km | MPC · JPL |
| 244968 | 2004 BK_{18} | — | January 17, 2004 | Palomar | NEAT | · | 6.0 km | MPC · JPL |
| 244969 | 2004 BA_{26} | — | January 18, 2004 | Needville | J. Dellinger | fast | 2.4 km | MPC · JPL |
| 244970 | 2004 BU_{29} | — | January 18, 2004 | Palomar | NEAT | · | 4.4 km | MPC · JPL |
| 244971 | 2004 BN_{37} | — | January 19, 2004 | Kitt Peak | Spacewatch | · | 2.8 km | MPC · JPL |
| 244972 | 2004 BX_{40} | — | January 21, 2004 | Socorro | LINEAR | · | 4.8 km | MPC · JPL |
| 244973 | 2004 BV_{41} | — | January 19, 2004 | Catalina | CSS | EUN | 1.8 km | MPC · JPL |
| 244974 | 2004 BA_{45} | — | January 22, 2004 | Socorro | LINEAR | H | 870 m | MPC · JPL |
| 244975 | 2004 BN_{55} | — | January 22, 2004 | Socorro | LINEAR | · | 2.6 km | MPC · JPL |
| 244976 | 2004 BA_{66} | — | January 22, 2004 | Socorro | LINEAR | · | 3.3 km | MPC · JPL |
| 244977 | 2004 BE_{68} | — | January 27, 2004 | Socorro | LINEAR | APO · PHA | 500 m | MPC · JPL |
| 244978 | 2004 BZ_{77} | — | January 22, 2004 | Socorro | LINEAR | · | 4.3 km | MPC · JPL |
| 244979 | 2004 BL_{82} | — | January 27, 2004 | Anderson Mesa | LONEOS | · | 5.3 km | MPC · JPL |
| 244980 | 2004 BR_{84} | — | January 27, 2004 | Anderson Mesa | LONEOS | · | 4.0 km | MPC · JPL |
| 244981 | 2004 BF_{86} | — | January 27, 2004 | Goodricke-Pigott | Goodricke-Pigott | · | 6.6 km | MPC · JPL |
| 244982 | 2004 BT_{91} | — | January 25, 2004 | Haleakala | NEAT | · | 3.1 km | MPC · JPL |
| 244983 | 2004 BM_{93} | — | January 28, 2004 | Socorro | LINEAR | · | 2.5 km | MPC · JPL |
| 244984 | 2004 BO_{98} | — | January 27, 2004 | Kitt Peak | Spacewatch | · | 4.7 km | MPC · JPL |
| 244985 | 2004 BN_{103} | — | January 31, 2004 | Socorro | LINEAR | H | 790 m | MPC · JPL |
| 244986 | 2004 BN_{109} | — | January 28, 2004 | Catalina | CSS | · | 4.4 km | MPC · JPL |
| 244987 | 2004 BK_{113} | — | January 28, 2004 | Catalina | CSS | TIR | 2.8 km | MPC · JPL |
| 244988 | 2004 BQ_{115} | — | January 30, 2004 | Socorro | LINEAR | · | 3.5 km | MPC · JPL |
| 244989 | 2004 BZ_{117} | — | January 29, 2004 | Socorro | LINEAR | · | 3.4 km | MPC · JPL |
| 244990 | 2004 BX_{118} | — | January 30, 2004 | Catalina | CSS | · | 4.1 km | MPC · JPL |
| 244991 | 2004 BD_{119} | — | January 30, 2004 | Kitt Peak | Spacewatch | · | 3.4 km | MPC · JPL |
| 244992 | 2004 BO_{119} | — | January 30, 2004 | Socorro | LINEAR | · | 4.5 km | MPC · JPL |
| 244993 | 2004 BE_{140} | — | January 19, 2004 | Kitt Peak | Spacewatch | · | 1.8 km | MPC · JPL |
| 244994 | 2004 BH_{147} | — | January 22, 2004 | Socorro | LINEAR | EOS | 3.8 km | MPC · JPL |
| 244995 | 2004 BK_{149} | — | January 16, 2004 | Kitt Peak | Spacewatch | · | 2.2 km | MPC · JPL |
| 244996 | 2004 BK_{152} | — | January 19, 2004 | Kitt Peak | Spacewatch | · | 3.8 km | MPC · JPL |
| 244997 | 2004 CT_{3} | — | February 10, 2004 | Palomar | NEAT | · | 5.0 km | MPC · JPL |
| 244998 | 2004 CV_{7} | — | February 10, 2004 | Catalina | CSS | · | 2.0 km | MPC · JPL |
| 244999 | 2004 CE_{10} | — | February 11, 2004 | Kitt Peak | Spacewatch | · | 3.5 km | MPC · JPL |
| 245000 | 2004 CK_{25} | — | February 11, 2004 | Kitt Peak | Spacewatch | · | 2.2 km | MPC · JPL |

back to top

== See also ==
- Meanings of minor-planet names: 244001–245000
