= Meanings of minor-planet names: 243001–244000 =

As minor planet discoveries are confirmed, they are given a permanent number by the IAU's Minor Planet Center (MPC), and the discoverers can then submit names for them, following the IAU's naming conventions. The list below concerns those minor planets in the specified number-range that have received names, and explains the meanings of those names.

Official naming citations of newly named small Solar System bodies are approved and published in a bulletin by IAU's Working Group for Small Bodies Nomenclature (WGSBN). Before May 2021, citations were published in MPC's Minor Planet Circulars for many decades. Recent citations can also be found on the JPL Small-Body Database (SBDB). Until his death in 2016, German astronomer Lutz D. Schmadel compiled these citations into the Dictionary of Minor Planet Names (DMP) and regularly updated the collection.

Based on Paul Herget's The Names of the Minor Planets, Schmadel also researched the unclear origin of numerous asteroids, most of which had been named prior to World War II. This article incorporates text from this source, which is in the public domain: SBDB New namings may only be added to this list below after official publication as the preannouncement of names is condemned. The WGSBN publishes a comprehensive guideline for the naming rules of non-cometary small Solar System bodies.

== 243001–243100 ==
Named minor planet	Provisional	This minor planet was named for...	Ref; Catalog
243002 Lemmy	2006 TG_{119}	Lemmy (1945–2015) was an English musician, singer and songwriter whose music helped set the foundations for the heavy metal genre	JPL · 243002
243073 Freistetter	2007 HT_{3}	Florian Freistetter (born 1977), an astronomer and science writer.	JPL · 243073
243094 Dirlewanger	2007 RU_{8}	Wolfgang Dirlewanger (born 1953), leader of dental clinic in Nagold, Germany	JPL · 243094
243096 Klauswerner	2007 RX_{15}	Klaus Werner (born 1957), German astronomer and professor of astronomy at the University of Tübingen	JPL · 243096
243097 Batavia	2007 RF_{16}	The fort of Batavia (Castro Batava) was a Roman frontier fort (1st to 5th century AD) in the area of Passau in Bavaria, Germany.	JPL · 243097

== 243101–243200 ==
back to top

Named minor planet	Provisional	This minor planet was named for...	Ref; Catalog
243109 Hansludwig	2007 RT_{132}	Hans-Ludwig Neumann (1938–1991), a German physicist and amateur astronomer. From 1976 to 1991, he was the president of the Physical society (German: Physikalischer Verein) based in Frankfurt am Main.	JPL · 243109

== 243201–243300 ==
back to top

Named minor planet	Provisional	This minor planet was named for...	Ref; Catalog
243204 Kubanchoria	2007 UA_{5}	The Kuban Cossack Choir, a folkloric Russian ensemble, was founded on 1811 and named on the occasion of its 200th anniversary on 12 October 2011 (M.P.C. 76677).	JPL · 243204
243262 Korkosz	2007 YV_{47}	Frank and John Korkosz, of Chicopee, Massachusetts, were pioneers in the development of mid-sized, high-quality planetariums.	JPL · 243262
243285 Fauvaud	2008 CJ_{181}	Stéphane Fauvaud (born 1968), an active French amateur astronomer	JPL · 243285

== 243301–243400 ==
back to top

Named minor planet	Provisional	This minor planet was named for...	Ref; Catalog
243320 Jackuipers	2008 SG_{12}	Jack Kuipers (1921–2016), an American aerospace engineer and mathematician. He taught mathematics at Calvin College for 20 years after a 17-year engineering career in the aerospace industry and is known for his book on quaternions: Quaternions and rotation Sequences: a Primer with Applications to Orbits, Aerospace, and Virtual Reality ( Src).	JPL · 243320
243381 Alessio	2008 YM_{4}	Alessio Muler (born 2002), second son of Argentine-born Spanish amateur astronomer Gustavo Muler, who co-discovered this minor planet	JPL · 243381

== 243401–243500 ==
back to top

Named minor planet	Provisional	This minor planet was named for...	Ref; Catalog
243440 Colonia	2009 FD_{2}	Colonia (Colonia Claudia Ara Agrippinensium) is the Roman name for Cologne, Germany's fourth-largest city, founded in the year 38 BC by the Romans.	JPL · 243440
243458 Bubulina	2009 QQ_{38}	Marina Denisa Botofan (2008–2010), nicknamed "Bubulina", who lived in Constanta, Romania, and died in Pavia, Italy, of lymphoblastic leukemia.	JPL · 243458
243491 Mühlviertel	2009 UH_{19}	Muehlviertel, the northernmost of the four districts of Upper Austria.	JPL · 243491

== 243501–243600 ==
back to top

Named minor planet	Provisional	This minor planet was named for...	Ref; Catalog
243516 Marklarsen	2009 FD_{2}	Mark Larson (born 1962), a senior scientist at the Space Dynamics Laboratory at Utah State University, responsible for the camera aboard the WISE spacecraft	JPL · 243516
243526 Russwalker	2010 DY_{28}	Russ Walker (born 1931), an astronomer specializing in infrared observations of small Solar System bodies	JPL · 243526
243529 Petereisenhardt	2010 DO_{50}	Peter Eisenhardt (born 1957) is the project scientist for the WISE mission and a former member of the Spitzer Infrared Array Camera science team.	JPL · 243529
243536 Mannheim	2010 EQ_{111}	Mannheim, a German city in the federal state of Baden-Württemberg	JPL · 243536
243546 Fengchuanliu	2010 JH_{61}	Fengchuan Liu (born 1965), an expert in cryogenic physics who served as the project manager for the Wide-field Infrared Survey Explorer and NEOWISE projects and who has worked on a number of other NASA low temperature physics experiments	JPL · 243546
243591 Ignacostantino	1998 RG_{3}	Ignazio Costantino (born 1960), an Italian amateur astronomer, electrionic engineer, and a sailor	JPL · 243591

== 243601–243700 ==
back to top

Named minor planet	Provisional	This minor planet was named for...	Ref; Catalog
243637 Frosinone	1999 TZ_{10}	Named Frusna in ancient Volscan and Frusino by the Romans, Frosinone is a provincial administrative seat and the discoverer's birthplace.	JPL · 243637

== 243701–243800 ==
back to top

Named minor planet	Provisional	This minor planet was named for...	Ref; Catalog
There are no named minor planets in this number range

== 243801–243900 ==
back to top

Named minor planet	Provisional	This minor planet was named for...	Ref; Catalog
There are no named minor planets in this number range

== 243901–244000 ==
back to top

Named minor planet	Provisional	This minor planet was named for...	Ref; Catalog
There are no named minor planets in this number range

back to top

Preceded by 242,001–243,000	Meanings of minor-planet names List of minor planets: 243,001–244,000	Succeeded by 244,001–245,000
