= List of minor planets: 243001–244000 =

The following is a partial list of minor planets, running from minor-planet number 243001 through 244000, inclusive. The primary data for this and other partial lists is based on JPL's "Small-Body Orbital Elements" and data available from the Minor Planet Center. Critical list information is also provided by the MPC, unless otherwise specified from Lowell Observatory. A detailed description of the table's columns and additional sources are given on the main page including a complete list of every page in this series, and a statistical break-up on the dynamical classification of minor planets.

Also see the summary list of all named bodies in numerical and alphabetical order, and the corresponding naming citations for the number range of this particular list. New namings may only be added to this list after official publication, as the preannouncement of names is condemned by the Working Group for Small Bodies Nomenclature of the International Astronomical Union.

Near-Earth obj.	MBA (inner)	MBA (outer)	Centaur
Mars-crosser	MBA (middle)	Jupiter trojan	Trans-Neptunian obj.
Unclassified

== 243001–243100 ==
Designation			Discovery			Properties		Ref
Permanent	Provisional	Named after	Date	Site	Discoverer(s)	Category	Diam.	Ref
243001	2006 TF_{114}	—	October 1, 2006	Apache Point	A. C. Becker	·	3.2 km	MPC · JPL
243002 Lemmy	2006 TG_{119}	Lemmy	October 11, 2006	Apache Point	A. C. Becker	·	2.4 km	MPC · JPL
243003	2006 TY_{120}	—	October 12, 2006	Apache Point	A. C. Becker	·	4.8 km	MPC · JPL
243004	2006 UF_{6}	—	October 16, 2006	Catalina	CSS	HYG	3.7 km	MPC · JPL
243005	2006 UC_{9}	—	October 16, 2006	Catalina	CSS	TEL · fast	2.0 km	MPC · JPL
243006	2006 UP_{26}	—	October 16, 2006	Kitt Peak	Spacewatch	ELF	4.9 km	MPC · JPL
243007	2006 UL_{62}	—	October 19, 2006	Kitt Peak	Spacewatch	AST	2.8 km	MPC · JPL
243008	2006 UO_{67}	—	October 16, 2006	Catalina	CSS	·	4.4 km	MPC · JPL
243009	2006 UV_{71}	—	October 17, 2006	Kitt Peak	Spacewatch	EOS	2.2 km	MPC · JPL
243010	2006 UU_{80}	—	October 17, 2006	Mount Lemmon	Mount Lemmon Survey	·	4.9 km	MPC · JPL
243011	2006 UW_{106}	—	October 18, 2006	Kitt Peak	Spacewatch	·	2.2 km	MPC · JPL
243012	2006 UT_{139}	—	October 19, 2006	Mount Lemmon	Mount Lemmon Survey	·	4.6 km	MPC · JPL
243013	2006 UY_{156}	—	October 21, 2006	Mount Lemmon	Mount Lemmon Survey	·	2.7 km	MPC · JPL
243014	2006 UN_{161}	—	October 21, 2006	Catalina	CSS	SYL · CYB	7.1 km	MPC · JPL
243015	2006 UK_{166}	—	October 21, 2006	Mount Lemmon	Mount Lemmon Survey	·	2.7 km	MPC · JPL
243016	2006 UE_{172}	—	October 21, 2006	Mount Lemmon	Mount Lemmon Survey	HYG	4.6 km	MPC · JPL
243017	2006 UN_{177}	—	October 16, 2006	Catalina	CSS	·	2.6 km	MPC · JPL
243018	2006 UM_{178}	—	October 16, 2006	Catalina	CSS	·	3.2 km	MPC · JPL
243019	2006 UL_{181}	—	October 16, 2006	Catalina	CSS	EOS	3.3 km	MPC · JPL
243020	2006 UU_{192}	—	October 19, 2006	Catalina	CSS	·	5.0 km	MPC · JPL
243021	2006 UL_{200}	—	October 21, 2006	Kitt Peak	Spacewatch	·	1.7 km	MPC · JPL
243022	2006 UG_{204}	—	October 22, 2006	Palomar	NEAT	·	2.7 km	MPC · JPL
243023	2006 UG_{206}	—	October 23, 2006	Kitt Peak	Spacewatch	CYB	5.7 km	MPC · JPL
243024	2006 UJ_{207}	—	October 23, 2006	Palomar	NEAT	·	3.1 km	MPC · JPL
243025	2006 UM_{216}	—	October 21, 2006	Catalina	CSS	AMO +1km	2.1 km	MPC · JPL
243026	2006 UX_{224}	—	October 19, 2006	Mount Lemmon	Mount Lemmon Survey	·	3.2 km	MPC · JPL
243027	2006 UG_{226}	—	October 20, 2006	Palomar	NEAT	·	3.3 km	MPC · JPL
243028	2006 UA_{233}	—	October 21, 2006	Palomar	NEAT	·	2.4 km	MPC · JPL
243029	2006 UF_{261}	—	October 28, 2006	Catalina	CSS	·	2.4 km	MPC · JPL
243030	2006 UN_{264}	—	October 27, 2006	Kitt Peak	Spacewatch	·	3.6 km	MPC · JPL
243031	2006 UV_{295}	—	October 19, 2006	Kitt Peak	M. W. Buie	·	2.6 km	MPC · JPL
243032	2006 VD_{23}	—	November 10, 2006	Kitt Peak	Spacewatch	·	3.1 km	MPC · JPL
243033	2006 VA_{37}	—	November 11, 2006	Catalina	CSS	·	2.1 km	MPC · JPL
243034	2006 VH_{85}	—	November 13, 2006	Kitt Peak	Spacewatch	·	2.7 km	MPC · JPL
243035	2006 VT_{95}	—	November 13, 2006	San Marcello	San Marcello	TIR	4.1 km	MPC · JPL
243036	2006 VO_{97}	—	November 11, 2006	Kitt Peak	Spacewatch	PAD	3.2 km	MPC · JPL
243037	2006 VC_{136}	—	November 15, 2006	Mount Lemmon	Mount Lemmon Survey	·	2.2 km	MPC · JPL
243038	2006 WP_{10}	—	November 16, 2006	Socorro	LINEAR	·	2.1 km	MPC · JPL
243039	2006 WN_{20}	—	November 17, 2006	Catalina	CSS	·	4.9 km	MPC · JPL
243040	2006 WZ_{47}	—	November 16, 2006	Mount Lemmon	Mount Lemmon Survey	EOS	2.6 km	MPC · JPL
243041	2006 WR_{123}	—	November 21, 2006	Mount Lemmon	Mount Lemmon Survey	·	4.1 km	MPC · JPL
243042	2006 WB_{139}	—	November 19, 2006	Catalina	CSS	·	3.2 km	MPC · JPL
243043	2006 WW_{195}	—	November 17, 2006	Mount Lemmon	Mount Lemmon Survey	HOF	4.1 km	MPC · JPL
243044	2006 XY_{21}	—	December 12, 2006	Kitt Peak	Spacewatch	·	5.9 km	MPC · JPL
243045	2006 XS_{31}	—	December 11, 2006	Kitt Peak	Spacewatch	CYB	5.6 km	MPC · JPL
243046	2006 XV_{42}	—	December 12, 2006	Mount Lemmon	Mount Lemmon Survey	·	3.5 km	MPC · JPL
243047	2006 XJ_{55}	—	December 15, 2006	Mount Lemmon	Mount Lemmon Survey	·	4.0 km	MPC · JPL
243048	2006 YO_{50}	—	December 19, 2006	Purple Mountain	PMO NEO Survey Program	LIX	6.1 km	MPC · JPL
243049	2007 BQ_{2}	—	January 17, 2007	Catalina	CSS	·	7.0 km	MPC · JPL
243050	2007 BX_{3}	—	January 16, 2007	Mount Lemmon	Mount Lemmon Survey	CYB	4.2 km	MPC · JPL
243051	2007 BB_{65}	—	January 27, 2007	Mount Lemmon	Mount Lemmon Survey	·	1.6 km	MPC · JPL
243052	2007 BP_{73}	—	January 24, 2007	Catalina	CSS	H	760 m	MPC · JPL
243053	2007 CD_{53}	—	February 13, 2007	Socorro	LINEAR	H	770 m	MPC · JPL
243054	2007 CF_{64}	—	February 13, 2007	Socorro	LINEAR	·	5.4 km	MPC · JPL
243055	2007 DL_{20}	—	February 17, 2007	Kitt Peak	Spacewatch	·	3.1 km	MPC · JPL
243056	2007 DV_{22}	—	February 17, 2007	Kitt Peak	Spacewatch	NEM	3.1 km	MPC · JPL
243057	2007 DC_{37}	—	February 17, 2007	Kitt Peak	Spacewatch	·	4.5 km	MPC · JPL
243058	2007 EB_{24}	—	March 10, 2007	Mount Lemmon	Mount Lemmon Survey	·	4.5 km	MPC · JPL
243059	2007 EN_{105}	—	March 11, 2007	Mount Lemmon	Mount Lemmon Survey	AST	3.1 km	MPC · JPL
243060	2007 EB_{125}	—	March 15, 2007	Socorro	LINEAR	H	680 m	MPC · JPL
243061	2007 ET_{172}	—	March 14, 2007	Kitt Peak	Spacewatch	HOF	2.8 km	MPC · JPL
243062	2007 ER_{192}	—	March 14, 2007	Kitt Peak	Spacewatch	·	2.6 km	MPC · JPL
243063	2007 ET_{206}	—	March 13, 2007	Mount Lemmon	Mount Lemmon Survey	KON	3.3 km	MPC · JPL
243064	2007 FT_{44}	—	March 26, 2007	Mount Lemmon	Mount Lemmon Survey	EOS	3.3 km	MPC · JPL
243065	2007 GC_{1}	—	April 9, 2007	Črni Vrh	Skvarč, J.	·	3.8 km	MPC · JPL
243066	2007 GX_{17}	—	April 11, 2007	Kitt Peak	Spacewatch	·	5.3 km	MPC · JPL
243067	2007 GE_{34}	—	April 13, 2007	Siding Spring	SSS	T_{j} (2.99)	5.9 km	MPC · JPL
243068	2007 GN_{36}	—	April 14, 2007	Kitt Peak	Spacewatch	·	3.1 km	MPC · JPL
243069	2007 GD_{37}	—	April 14, 2007	Kitt Peak	Spacewatch	·	1.6 km	MPC · JPL
243070	2007 GG_{61}	—	April 15, 2007	Kitt Peak	Spacewatch	·	5.5 km	MPC · JPL
243071	2007 GA_{64}	—	April 15, 2007	Kitt Peak	Spacewatch	·	6.9 km	MPC · JPL
243072	2007 HH_{3}	—	April 16, 2007	Mount Lemmon	Mount Lemmon Survey	·	3.7 km	MPC · JPL
243073 Freistetter	2007 HT_{3}	Freistetter	April 16, 2007	Drebach	~Knöfel, A.	T_{j} (2.96)	7.2 km	MPC · JPL
243074	2007 HE_{9}	—	April 18, 2007	Mount Lemmon	Mount Lemmon Survey	ERI	1.9 km	MPC · JPL
243075	2007 HZ_{38}	—	April 20, 2007	Socorro	LINEAR	DOR	2.8 km	MPC · JPL
243076	2007 HC_{49}	—	April 20, 2007	Kitt Peak	Spacewatch	·	910 m	MPC · JPL
243077	2007 HM_{59}	—	April 18, 2007	Mount Lemmon	Mount Lemmon Survey	EMA	4.9 km	MPC · JPL
243078	2007 HC_{87}	—	April 24, 2007	Kitt Peak	Spacewatch	·	2.9 km	MPC · JPL
243079	2007 JN_{35}	—	May 13, 2007	Tiki	S. F. Hönig, Teamo, N.	VER	4.7 km	MPC · JPL
243080	2007 KP_{3}	—	May 17, 2007	Catalina	CSS	·	4.7 km	MPC · JPL
243081	2007 LY_{20}	—	June 12, 2007	Kitt Peak	Spacewatch	·	4.6 km	MPC · JPL
243082	2007 LE_{33}	—	June 15, 2007	Kitt Peak	Spacewatch	·	1.2 km	MPC · JPL
243083	2007 NU_{6}	—	July 15, 2007	Siding Spring	SSS	·	3.1 km	MPC · JPL
243084	2007 NL_{7}	—	July 11, 2007	Siding Spring	SSS	L4	18 km	MPC · JPL
243085	2007 OM_{4}	—	July 22, 2007	Siding Spring	SSS	PAL	3.3 km	MPC · JPL
243086	2007 PH_{2}	—	August 5, 2007	7300	W. K. Y. Yeung	·	2.8 km	MPC · JPL
243087	2007 PD_{37}	—	August 13, 2007	Socorro	LINEAR	·	720 m	MPC · JPL
243088	2007 PL_{45}	—	August 11, 2007	Siding Spring	SSS	L4	17 km	MPC · JPL
243089	2007 QN_{2}	—	August 21, 2007	Hibiscus	S. F. Hönig, Teamo, N.	·	3.7 km	MPC · JPL
243090	2007 QA_{3}	—	August 22, 2007	Hibiscus	S. F. Hönig, Teamo, N.	·	920 m	MPC · JPL
243091	2007 QH_{8}	—	August 21, 2007	Anderson Mesa	LONEOS	MAS	1.1 km	MPC · JPL
243092	2007 QY_{12}	—	August 24, 2007	Kitt Peak	Spacewatch	·	1.6 km	MPC · JPL
243093	2007 RK	—	September 1, 2007	Dauban	Chante-Perdrix	HOF	3.6 km	MPC · JPL
243094 Dirlewanger	2007 RU_{8}	Dirlewanger	September 6, 2007	Wildberg	R. Apitzsch	·	1.2 km	MPC · JPL
243095	2007 RG_{10}	—	September 3, 2007	Catalina	CSS	V	980 m	MPC · JPL
243096 Klauswerner	2007 RX_{15}	Klauswerner	September 12, 2007	Wildberg	R. Apitzsch	·	4.9 km	MPC · JPL
243097 Batavia	2007 RF_{16}	Batavia	September 12, 2007	Gaisberg	Gierlinger, R.	·	3.1 km	MPC · JPL
243098	2007 RX_{21}	—	September 3, 2007	Catalina	CSS	·	3.4 km	MPC · JPL
243099	2007 RR_{27}	—	September 4, 2007	Catalina	CSS	·	1.1 km	MPC · JPL
243100	2007 RQ_{31}	—	September 5, 2007	Catalina	CSS	·	700 m	MPC · JPL

== 243101–243200 ==
back to top

Designation			Discovery			Properties		Ref
Permanent	Provisional	Named after	Date	Site	Discoverer(s)	Category	Diam.	Ref
243101	2007 RK_{45}	—	September 9, 2007	Kitt Peak	Spacewatch	·	2.0 km	MPC · JPL
243102	2007 RA_{48}	—	September 9, 2007	Mount Lemmon	Mount Lemmon Survey	·	5.1 km	MPC · JPL
243103	2007 RL_{50}	—	September 9, 2007	Kitt Peak	Spacewatch	·	3.2 km	MPC · JPL
243104	2007 RV_{52}	—	September 9, 2007	Kitt Peak	Spacewatch	VER	4.7 km	MPC · JPL
243105	2007 RE_{103}	—	September 11, 2007	Catalina	CSS	NYS	1.3 km	MPC · JPL
243106	2007 RG_{108}	—	September 11, 2007	Kitt Peak	Spacewatch	·	3.1 km	MPC · JPL
243107	2007 RV_{109}	—	September 11, 2007	Kitt Peak	Spacewatch	·	1.0 km	MPC · JPL
243108	2007 RN_{111}	—	September 11, 2007	Kitt Peak	Spacewatch	·	870 m	MPC · JPL
243109 Hansludwig	2007 RT_{132}	Hansludwig	September 12, 2007	Taunus	Karge, S., E. Schwab	·	1.5 km	MPC · JPL
243110	2007 RL_{135}	—	September 13, 2007	Anderson Mesa	LONEOS	·	1.7 km	MPC · JPL
243111	2007 RY_{138}	—	September 15, 2007	Lulin	LUSS	V	960 m	MPC · JPL
243112	2007 RW_{140}	—	September 13, 2007	Socorro	LINEAR	·	1.3 km	MPC · JPL
243113	2007 RH_{145}	—	September 14, 2007	Socorro	LINEAR	·	3.9 km	MPC · JPL
243114	2007 RX_{146}	—	September 11, 2007	Catalina	CSS	·	3.0 km	MPC · JPL
243115	2007 RR_{157}	—	September 11, 2007	Purple Mountain	PMO NEO Survey Program	V	1.2 km	MPC · JPL
243116	2007 RT_{165}	—	September 10, 2007	Kitt Peak	Spacewatch	·	950 m	MPC · JPL
243117	2007 RL_{176}	—	September 9, 2007	Mount Lemmon	Mount Lemmon Survey	MAS	930 m	MPC · JPL
243118	2007 RR_{180}	—	September 11, 2007	Mount Lemmon	Mount Lemmon Survey	HOF	3.2 km	MPC · JPL
243119	2007 RD_{184}	—	September 13, 2007	Catalina	CSS	·	3.1 km	MPC · JPL
243120	2007 RE_{199}	—	September 13, 2007	Catalina	CSS	NEM	2.8 km	MPC · JPL
243121	2007 RC_{203}	—	September 13, 2007	Kitt Peak	Spacewatch	·	5.8 km	MPC · JPL
243122	2007 RK_{203}	—	September 13, 2007	Kitt Peak	Spacewatch	·	4.4 km	MPC · JPL
243123	2007 RD_{220}	—	September 14, 2007	Mount Lemmon	Mount Lemmon Survey	·	1.5 km	MPC · JPL
243124	2007 RT_{239}	—	September 14, 2007	Catalina	CSS	·	2.3 km	MPC · JPL
243125	2007 RT_{244}	—	September 11, 2007	Kitt Peak	Spacewatch	MAS	840 m	MPC · JPL
243126	2007 RU_{245}	—	September 12, 2007	Catalina	CSS	·	5.1 km	MPC · JPL
243127	2007 RY_{258}	—	September 14, 2007	Catalina	CSS	·	1.4 km	MPC · JPL
243128	2007 RA_{259}	—	September 14, 2007	Mount Lemmon	Mount Lemmon Survey	·	4.8 km	MPC · JPL
243129	2007 RS_{267}	—	September 15, 2007	Kitt Peak	Spacewatch	LIX	5.4 km	MPC · JPL
243130	2007 RQ_{279}	—	September 6, 2007	Siding Spring	SSS	·	6.1 km	MPC · JPL
243131	2007 RA_{282}	—	September 15, 2007	Catalina	CSS	·	6.1 km	MPC · JPL
243132	2007 RH_{289}	—	September 12, 2007	Catalina	CSS	·	5.1 km	MPC · JPL
243133	2007 RM_{298}	—	September 10, 2007	Kitt Peak	Spacewatch	·	4.2 km	MPC · JPL
243134	2007 RT_{298}	—	September 10, 2007	Kitt Peak	Spacewatch	·	3.2 km	MPC · JPL
243135	2007 RO_{301}	—	September 13, 2007	Mount Lemmon	Mount Lemmon Survey	NYS	1.7 km	MPC · JPL
243136	2007 RJ_{303}	—	September 4, 2007	Catalina	CSS	·	1.8 km	MPC · JPL
243137	2007 RL_{310}	—	September 5, 2007	Catalina	CSS	V	1.1 km	MPC · JPL
243138	2007 RN_{311}	—	September 15, 2007	Anderson Mesa	LONEOS	·	3.8 km	MPC · JPL
243139	2007 RC_{322}	—	September 10, 2007	Mount Lemmon	Mount Lemmon Survey	·	3.1 km	MPC · JPL
243140	2007 RO_{325}	—	September 15, 2007	Kitt Peak	Spacewatch	·	2.7 km	MPC · JPL
243141	2007 TG_{6}	—	October 6, 2007	Dauban	Chante-Perdrix	·	5.6 km	MPC · JPL
243142	2007 TH_{6}	—	October 6, 2007	Dauban	Chante-Perdrix	VER	5.4 km	MPC · JPL
243143	2007 TE_{8}	—	October 7, 2007	Mayhill	Lowe, A.	·	1.3 km	MPC · JPL
243144	2007 TL_{13}	—	October 6, 2007	Socorro	LINEAR	MAR	1.9 km	MPC · JPL
243145	2007 TB_{15}	—	October 8, 2007	7300	W. K. Y. Yeung	NYS	1.6 km	MPC · JPL
243146	2007 TJ_{18}	—	October 7, 2007	Nashville	Clingan, R.	NYS	1.8 km	MPC · JPL
243147	2007 TX_{18}	—	October 9, 2007	Catalina	CSS	AMO +1km	910 m	MPC · JPL
243148	2007 TN_{19}	—	October 7, 2007	Črni Vrh	Skvarč, J.	EOS	4.4 km	MPC · JPL
243149	2007 TT_{22}	—	October 9, 2007	Goodricke-Pigott	R. A. Tucker	T_{j} (2.99) · (895)	5.2 km	MPC · JPL
243150	2007 TV_{29}	—	October 4, 2007	Kitt Peak	Spacewatch	·	4.5 km	MPC · JPL
243151	2007 TA_{33}	—	October 6, 2007	Kitt Peak	Spacewatch	·	1.5 km	MPC · JPL
243152	2007 TZ_{34}	—	October 6, 2007	Kitt Peak	Spacewatch	ADE	3.1 km	MPC · JPL
243153	2007 TO_{46}	—	October 8, 2007	Mount Lemmon	Mount Lemmon Survey	·	5.5 km	MPC · JPL
243154	2007 TV_{49}	—	October 4, 2007	Kitt Peak	Spacewatch	·	3.1 km	MPC · JPL
243155	2007 TR_{63}	—	October 7, 2007	Mount Lemmon	Mount Lemmon Survey	AST	3.2 km	MPC · JPL
243156	2007 TP_{66}	—	October 10, 2007	Dauban	Chante-Perdrix	NYS	1.2 km	MPC · JPL
243157	2007 TE_{68}	—	October 10, 2007	Lulin	LUSS	·	1.5 km	MPC · JPL
243158	2007 TG_{68}	—	October 11, 2007	Calvin-Rehoboth	Calvin College	·	1.8 km	MPC · JPL
243159	2007 TD_{74}	—	October 14, 2007	Mount Lemmon	Mount Lemmon Survey	L4	18 km	MPC · JPL
243160	2007 TB_{75}	—	October 15, 2007	Kleť	Kleť	EOS	6.0 km	MPC · JPL
243161	2007 TG_{79}	—	October 5, 2007	Kitt Peak	Spacewatch	·	2.3 km	MPC · JPL
243162	2007 TP_{86}	—	October 8, 2007	Mount Lemmon	Mount Lemmon Survey	·	1.6 km	MPC · JPL
243163	2007 TK_{94}	—	October 7, 2007	Catalina	CSS	·	2.7 km	MPC · JPL
243164	2007 TW_{94}	—	October 7, 2007	Catalina	CSS	·	5.4 km	MPC · JPL
243165	2007 TL_{98}	—	October 8, 2007	Mount Lemmon	Mount Lemmon Survey	·	2.0 km	MPC · JPL
243166	2007 TL_{108}	—	October 7, 2007	Catalina	CSS	·	4.3 km	MPC · JPL
243167	2007 TB_{109}	—	October 7, 2007	Catalina	CSS	·	2.9 km	MPC · JPL
243168	2007 TD_{110}	—	October 7, 2007	Catalina	CSS	MAR	1.7 km	MPC · JPL
243169	2007 TQ_{123}	—	October 6, 2007	Kitt Peak	Spacewatch	MAS	980 m	MPC · JPL
243170	2007 TD_{125}	—	October 6, 2007	Kitt Peak	Spacewatch	NYS	1.5 km	MPC · JPL
243171	2007 TA_{128}	—	October 6, 2007	Kitt Peak	Spacewatch	KOR	1.7 km	MPC · JPL
243172	2007 TD_{133}	—	October 7, 2007	Mount Lemmon	Mount Lemmon Survey	·	2.5 km	MPC · JPL
243173	2007 TG_{136}	—	October 8, 2007	Catalina	CSS	·	6.8 km	MPC · JPL
243174	2007 TY_{137}	—	October 8, 2007	Mount Lemmon	Mount Lemmon Survey	·	5.4 km	MPC · JPL
243175	2007 TH_{138}	—	October 8, 2007	Mount Lemmon	Mount Lemmon Survey	·	2.2 km	MPC · JPL
243176	2007 TV_{139}	—	October 9, 2007	Catalina	CSS	·	6.3 km	MPC · JPL
243177	2007 TG_{145}	—	October 6, 2007	Socorro	LINEAR	·	1.4 km	MPC · JPL
243178	2007 TW_{147}	—	October 7, 2007	Socorro	LINEAR	·	6.2 km	MPC · JPL
243179	2007 TZ_{154}	—	October 9, 2007	Socorro	LINEAR	·	2.1 km	MPC · JPL
243180	2007 TQ_{164}	—	October 11, 2007	Socorro	LINEAR	HOF	4.3 km	MPC · JPL
243181	2007 TC_{169}	—	October 12, 2007	Socorro	LINEAR	·	4.8 km	MPC · JPL
243182	2007 TK_{178}	—	October 6, 2007	Purple Mountain	PMO NEO Survey Program	·	4.2 km	MPC · JPL
243183	2007 TC_{212}	—	October 7, 2007	Kitt Peak	Spacewatch	EMA	5.6 km	MPC · JPL
243184	2007 TW_{216}	—	October 7, 2007	Kitt Peak	Spacewatch	HOF	3.9 km	MPC · JPL
243185	2007 TU_{228}	—	October 8, 2007	Kitt Peak	Spacewatch	·	3.0 km	MPC · JPL
243186	2007 TH_{230}	—	October 8, 2007	Kitt Peak	Spacewatch	·	5.9 km	MPC · JPL
243187	2007 TB_{265}	—	October 11, 2007	Kitt Peak	Spacewatch	·	2.1 km	MPC · JPL
243188	2007 TK_{272}	—	October 9, 2007	Kitt Peak	Spacewatch	NYS	1.5 km	MPC · JPL
243189	2007 TY_{288}	—	October 11, 2007	Catalina	CSS	EOS ·	5.8 km	MPC · JPL
243190	2007 TV_{296}	—	October 10, 2007	Mount Lemmon	Mount Lemmon Survey	(21885)	4.6 km	MPC · JPL
243191	2007 TP_{329}	—	October 11, 2007	Kitt Peak	Spacewatch	EOS	5.8 km	MPC · JPL
243192	2007 TS_{367}	—	October 10, 2007	Mount Lemmon	Mount Lemmon Survey	·	3.0 km	MPC · JPL
243193	2007 TJ_{371}	—	October 12, 2007	Catalina	CSS	TIN	3.7 km	MPC · JPL
243194	2007 TT_{376}	—	October 10, 2007	Catalina	CSS	·	3.0 km	MPC · JPL
243195	2007 TT_{377}	—	October 11, 2007	Kitt Peak	Spacewatch	·	4.5 km	MPC · JPL
243196	2007 TW_{403}	—	October 15, 2007	Kitt Peak	Spacewatch	·	3.5 km	MPC · JPL
243197	2007 TH_{414}	—	October 15, 2007	Catalina	CSS	·	2.3 km	MPC · JPL
243198	2007 TO_{441}	—	October 9, 2007	Catalina	CSS	EUN	2.6 km	MPC · JPL
243199	2007 TF_{443}	—	October 14, 2007	Catalina	CSS	·	6.4 km	MPC · JPL
243200	2007 TC_{447}	—	October 10, 2007	Kitt Peak	Spacewatch	KOR	1.9 km	MPC · JPL

== 243201–243300 ==
back to top

Designation			Discovery			Properties		Ref
Permanent	Provisional	Named after	Date	Site	Discoverer(s)	Category	Diam.	Ref
243201	2007 TV_{447}	—	October 13, 2007	Mount Lemmon	Mount Lemmon Survey	VER	5.1 km	MPC · JPL
243202	2007 TW_{448}	—	October 9, 2007	Kitt Peak	Spacewatch	·	4.2 km	MPC · JPL
243203	2007 TB_{453}	—	October 15, 2007	Mount Lemmon	Mount Lemmon Survey	MAR	1.0 km	MPC · JPL
243204 Kubanchoria	2007 UA_{5}	Kubanchoria	October 16, 2007	Andrushivka	Andrushivka	·	6.3 km	MPC · JPL
243205	2007 UD_{11}	—	October 18, 2007	Socorro	LINEAR	·	2.7 km	MPC · JPL
243206	2007 UK_{11}	—	October 19, 2007	Socorro	LINEAR	EUN	1.5 km	MPC · JPL
243207	2007 US_{26}	—	October 16, 2007	Mount Lemmon	Mount Lemmon Survey	·	1.5 km	MPC · JPL
243208	2007 UN_{27}	—	October 16, 2007	Mount Lemmon	Mount Lemmon Survey	·	1.7 km	MPC · JPL
243209	2007 UK_{31}	—	October 19, 2007	Catalina	CSS	·	4.5 km	MPC · JPL
243210	2007 UP_{40}	—	October 16, 2007	Kitt Peak	Spacewatch	·	1.6 km	MPC · JPL
243211	2007 UM_{44}	—	October 18, 2007	Mount Lemmon	Mount Lemmon Survey	HOF	3.5 km	MPC · JPL
243212	2007 UQ_{48}	—	October 20, 2007	Mount Lemmon	Mount Lemmon Survey	EOS	3.1 km	MPC · JPL
243213	2007 UX_{50}	—	October 24, 2007	Mount Lemmon	Mount Lemmon Survey	·	1.3 km	MPC · JPL
243214	2007 UE_{67}	—	October 30, 2007	Catalina	CSS	·	4.3 km	MPC · JPL
243215	2007 UU_{84}	—	October 30, 2007	Kitt Peak	Spacewatch	·	1.9 km	MPC · JPL
243216	2007 UT_{125}	—	October 31, 2007	Kitt Peak	Spacewatch	·	2.5 km	MPC · JPL
243217	2007 UC_{126}	—	October 18, 2007	Catalina	CSS	·	5.8 km	MPC · JPL
243218	2007 UB_{136}	—	October 16, 2007	Catalina	CSS	·	5.6 km	MPC · JPL
243219	2007 VA_{1}	—	November 2, 2007	Mount Lemmon	Mount Lemmon Survey	·	7.4 km	MPC · JPL
243220	2007 VK_{11}	—	November 2, 2007	Catalina	CSS	·	6.6 km	MPC · JPL
243221	2007 VY_{29}	—	November 2, 2007	Kitt Peak	Spacewatch	·	1.7 km	MPC · JPL
243222	2007 VV_{34}	—	November 3, 2007	Kitt Peak	Spacewatch	EOS	4.8 km	MPC · JPL
243223	2007 VV_{63}	—	November 1, 2007	Kitt Peak	Spacewatch	·	2.3 km	MPC · JPL
243224	2007 VN_{65}	—	November 1, 2007	Lulin	LUSS	·	4.5 km	MPC · JPL
243225	2007 VJ_{69}	—	November 4, 2007	Mount Lemmon	Mount Lemmon Survey	·	4.3 km	MPC · JPL
243226	2007 VH_{72}	—	November 1, 2007	Kitt Peak	Spacewatch	EUP	4.4 km	MPC · JPL
243227	2007 VY_{87}	—	November 2, 2007	Socorro	LINEAR	EOS	4.1 km	MPC · JPL
243228	2007 VQ_{88}	—	November 3, 2007	Socorro	LINEAR	·	5.6 km	MPC · JPL
243229	2007 VO_{90}	—	November 5, 2007	Socorro	LINEAR	·	3.5 km	MPC · JPL
243230	2007 VX_{90}	—	November 6, 2007	Socorro	LINEAR	·	3.1 km	MPC · JPL
243231	2007 VX_{92}	—	November 3, 2007	Socorro	LINEAR	·	4.2 km	MPC · JPL
243232	2007 VJ_{93}	—	November 3, 2007	Socorro	LINEAR	·	5.0 km	MPC · JPL
243233	2007 VZ_{93}	—	November 7, 2007	Socorro	LINEAR	·	5.8 km	MPC · JPL
243234	2007 VE_{122}	—	November 5, 2007	Kitt Peak	Spacewatch	AGN	1.4 km	MPC · JPL
243235	2007 VD_{140}	—	November 3, 2007	Lulin	LUSS	·	3.3 km	MPC · JPL
243236	2007 VZ_{146}	—	November 4, 2007	Kitt Peak	Spacewatch	·	4.3 km	MPC · JPL
243237	2007 VS_{164}	—	November 5, 2007	Kitt Peak	Spacewatch	·	1.9 km	MPC · JPL
243238	2007 VB_{167}	—	November 5, 2007	Mount Lemmon	Mount Lemmon Survey	CYB	7.0 km	MPC · JPL
243239	2007 VP_{168}	—	November 5, 2007	Kitt Peak	Spacewatch	EUN	2.1 km	MPC · JPL
243240	2007 VN_{169}	—	November 5, 2007	Kitt Peak	Spacewatch	·	2.5 km	MPC · JPL
243241	2007 VX_{189}	—	November 14, 2007	La Sagra	OAM	LUT	7.6 km	MPC · JPL
243242	2007 VG_{207}	—	November 9, 2007	Purple Mountain	PMO NEO Survey Program	(5)	2.4 km	MPC · JPL
243243	2007 VH_{219}	—	November 9, 2007	Kitt Peak	Spacewatch	KOR	1.8 km	MPC · JPL
243244	2007 VZ_{226}	—	November 11, 2007	Mount Lemmon	Mount Lemmon Survey	·	3.3 km	MPC · JPL
243245	2007 VH_{231}	—	November 7, 2007	Kitt Peak	Spacewatch	THM	2.7 km	MPC · JPL
243246	2007 VM_{233}	—	November 8, 2007	Kitt Peak	Spacewatch	·	3.6 km	MPC · JPL
243247	2007 VW_{265}	—	November 13, 2007	Kitt Peak	Spacewatch	·	4.0 km	MPC · JPL
243248	2007 VY_{273}	—	November 12, 2007	Catalina	CSS	·	8.1 km	MPC · JPL
243249	2007 VB_{301}	—	November 15, 2007	Anderson Mesa	LONEOS	WIT	1.4 km	MPC · JPL
243250	2007 VY_{311}	—	November 12, 2007	Mount Lemmon	Mount Lemmon Survey	·	3.4 km	MPC · JPL
243251	2007 VY_{315}	—	November 9, 2007	Catalina	CSS	EUN · fast	2.4 km	MPC · JPL
243252	2007 WS_{7}	—	November 18, 2007	Socorro	LINEAR	EOS	3.1 km	MPC · JPL
243253	2007 WS_{19}	—	November 18, 2007	Mount Lemmon	Mount Lemmon Survey	AGN	1.6 km	MPC · JPL
243254	2007 WP_{22}	—	November 17, 2007	Kitt Peak	Spacewatch	EUN	1.3 km	MPC · JPL
243255	2007 WL_{60}	—	November 17, 2007	Kitt Peak	Spacewatch	·	3.2 km	MPC · JPL
243256	2007 XC_{5}	—	December 4, 2007	Kitt Peak	Spacewatch	·	3.5 km	MPC · JPL
243257	2007 XS_{11}	—	December 4, 2007	Kitt Peak	Spacewatch	·	3.9 km	MPC · JPL
243258	2007 XD_{17}	—	December 5, 2007	Socorro	LINEAR	·	7.4 km	MPC · JPL
243259	2007 XM_{29}	—	December 15, 2007	Mount Lemmon	Mount Lemmon Survey	·	2.9 km	MPC · JPL
243260	2007 XD_{35}	—	December 13, 2007	Socorro	LINEAR	·	4.2 km	MPC · JPL
243261	2007 YM_{28}	—	December 18, 2007	Mount Lemmon	Mount Lemmon Survey	·	5.3 km	MPC · JPL
243262 Korkosz	2007 YV_{47}	Korkosz	December 31, 2007	Schiaparelli	L. Buzzi	·	4.0 km	MPC · JPL
243263	2007 YB_{49}	—	December 28, 2007	Kitt Peak	Spacewatch	·	5.9 km	MPC · JPL
243264	2007 YB_{60}	—	December 18, 2007	Catalina	CSS	·	2.0 km	MPC · JPL
243265	2007 YR_{61}	—	December 20, 2007	Kitt Peak	Spacewatch	·	2.9 km	MPC · JPL
243266	2008 AW	—	January 4, 2008	Pla D'Arguines	R. Ferrando	·	5.8 km	MPC · JPL
243267	2008 AM_{10}	—	January 10, 2008	Mount Lemmon	Mount Lemmon Survey	HIL · 3:2	5.2 km	MPC · JPL
243268	2008 AV_{34}	—	January 10, 2008	Kitt Peak	Spacewatch	·	2.0 km	MPC · JPL
243269	2008 AH_{44}	—	January 10, 2008	Kitt Peak	Spacewatch	·	2.9 km	MPC · JPL
243270	2008 AK_{65}	—	January 11, 2008	Mount Lemmon	Mount Lemmon Survey	·	4.6 km	MPC · JPL
243271	2008 BV_{6}	—	January 16, 2008	Kitt Peak	Spacewatch	·	3.6 km	MPC · JPL
243272	2008 BU_{10}	—	January 18, 2008	Kitt Peak	Spacewatch	·	5.9 km	MPC · JPL
243273	2008 BH_{18}	—	January 30, 2008	Mount Lemmon	Mount Lemmon Survey	·	4.6 km	MPC · JPL
243274	2008 BJ_{40}	—	January 30, 2008	Socorro	LINEAR	EOS	3.0 km	MPC · JPL
243275	2008 CN_{18}	—	February 3, 2008	Catalina	CSS	·	5.5 km	MPC · JPL
243276	2008 CB_{34}	—	February 2, 2008	Kitt Peak	Spacewatch	THM	3.1 km	MPC · JPL
243277	2008 CL_{43}	—	February 2, 2008	Kitt Peak	Spacewatch	·	3.7 km	MPC · JPL
243278	2008 CV_{51}	—	February 7, 2008	Kitt Peak	Spacewatch	·	3.0 km	MPC · JPL
243279	2008 CT_{68}	—	February 7, 2008	Costitx	OAM	LIX	5.6 km	MPC · JPL
243280	2008 CF_{82}	—	February 7, 2008	Mount Lemmon	Mount Lemmon Survey	·	2.7 km	MPC · JPL
243281	2008 CE_{86}	—	February 7, 2008	Mount Lemmon	Mount Lemmon Survey	·	4.5 km	MPC · JPL
243282	2008 CJ_{86}	—	February 7, 2008	Mount Lemmon	Mount Lemmon Survey	fast	4.5 km	MPC · JPL
243283	2008 CB_{148}	—	February 9, 2008	Kitt Peak	Spacewatch	·	2.4 km	MPC · JPL
243284	2008 CB_{161}	—	February 9, 2008	Kitt Peak	Spacewatch	·	4.2 km	MPC · JPL
243285 Fauvaud	2008 CJ_{181}	Fauvaud	February 11, 2008	Nogales	J.-C. Merlin	CYB	5.0 km	MPC · JPL
243286	2008 CO_{183}	—	February 13, 2008	Catalina	CSS	·	5.0 km	MPC · JPL
243287	2008 CA_{190}	—	February 1, 2008	Catalina	CSS	·	5.6 km	MPC · JPL
243288	2008 CA_{193}	—	February 8, 2008	Kitt Peak	Spacewatch	EOS	4.3 km	MPC · JPL
243289	2008 DX_{15}	—	February 27, 2008	Catalina	CSS	PAD	3.4 km	MPC · JPL
243290	2008 DD_{31}	—	February 27, 2008	Kitt Peak	Spacewatch	·	3.1 km	MPC · JPL
243291	2008 DK_{47}	—	February 28, 2008	Kitt Peak	Spacewatch	·	5.0 km	MPC · JPL
243292	2008 DS_{70}	—	February 27, 2008	Catalina	CSS	·	1.2 km	MPC · JPL
243293	2008 DH_{73}	—	February 27, 2008	Mount Lemmon	Mount Lemmon Survey	EOS	2.6 km	MPC · JPL
243294	2008 DN_{83}	—	February 18, 2008	Mount Lemmon	Mount Lemmon Survey	·	5.6 km	MPC · JPL
243295	2008 EP_{9}	—	March 1, 2008	Kitt Peak	Spacewatch	·	4.5 km	MPC · JPL
243296	2008 EY_{9}	—	March 1, 2008	Kitt Peak	Spacewatch	·	5.0 km	MPC · JPL
243297	2008 EJ_{60}	—	March 8, 2008	Catalina	CSS	·	5.0 km	MPC · JPL
243298	2008 EN_{82}	—	March 8, 2008	Socorro	LINEAR	AMO +1km	2.6 km	MPC · JPL
243299	2008 EN_{109}	—	March 7, 2008	Mount Lemmon	Mount Lemmon Survey	·	4.4 km	MPC · JPL
243300	2008 EN_{123}	—	March 9, 2008	Kitt Peak	Spacewatch	EOS	4.0 km	MPC · JPL

== 243301–243400 ==
back to top

Designation			Discovery			Properties		Ref
Permanent	Provisional	Named after	Date	Site	Discoverer(s)	Category	Diam.	Ref
243301	2008 EA_{137}	—	March 11, 2008	Kitt Peak	Spacewatch	·	1.9 km	MPC · JPL
243302	2008 FA_{37}	—	March 28, 2008	Mount Lemmon	Mount Lemmon Survey	·	3.1 km	MPC · JPL
243303	2008 FX_{40}	—	March 28, 2008	Kitt Peak	Spacewatch	(5)	2.5 km	MPC · JPL
243304	2008 GL_{145}	—	April 6, 2008	Kitt Peak	Spacewatch	·	1.4 km	MPC · JPL
243305	2008 GJ_{146}	—	April 15, 2008	Kitt Peak	Spacewatch	NYS	1.4 km	MPC · JPL
243306	2008 JV_{15}	—	May 3, 2008	Kitt Peak	Spacewatch	NYS ·	1.8 km	MPC · JPL
243307	2008 KX_{12}	—	May 27, 2008	Kitt Peak	Spacewatch	MIS	2.9 km	MPC · JPL
243308	2008 KJ_{30}	—	May 29, 2008	Kitt Peak	Spacewatch	·	2.4 km	MPC · JPL
243309	2008 OB_{15}	—	July 28, 2008	La Sagra	OAM	·	3.8 km	MPC · JPL
243310	2008 OU_{24}	—	July 30, 2008	Mount Lemmon	Mount Lemmon Survey	·	5.9 km	MPC · JPL
243311	2008 PN_{13}	—	August 10, 2008	La Sagra	OAM	HIL · 3:2	6.3 km	MPC · JPL
243312	2008 QE_{48}	—	August 26, 2008	Socorro	LINEAR	·	4.9 km	MPC · JPL
243313	2008 RH_{3}	—	September 2, 2008	Kitt Peak	Spacewatch	L4	9.9 km	MPC · JPL
243314	2008 RA_{15}	—	September 4, 2008	Kitt Peak	Spacewatch	L4	14 km	MPC · JPL
243315	2008 RP_{18}	—	September 4, 2008	Kitt Peak	Spacewatch	L4	9.7 km	MPC · JPL
243316	2008 RL_{32}	—	September 2, 2008	Kitt Peak	Spacewatch	L4 · 006	11 km	MPC · JPL
243317	2008 RE_{96}	—	September 7, 2008	Catalina	CSS	·	2.4 km	MPC · JPL
243318	2008 RS_{101}	—	September 2, 2008	Kitt Peak	Spacewatch	L4	12 km	MPC · JPL
243319	2008 RR_{109}	—	September 2, 2008	Kitt Peak	Spacewatch	T_{j} (2.99)	6.5 km	MPC · JPL
243320 Jackuipers	2008 SG_{12}	Jackuipers	September 24, 2008	Calvin-Rehoboth	Calvin College	(45637) · CYB	5.8 km	MPC · JPL
243321	2008 SG_{20}	—	September 19, 2008	Kitt Peak	Spacewatch	CYB	4.7 km	MPC · JPL
243322	2008 SG_{31}	—	September 20, 2008	Kitt Peak	Spacewatch	L4	12 km	MPC · JPL
243323	2008 SO_{36}	—	September 20, 2008	Mount Lemmon	Mount Lemmon Survey	L4	14 km	MPC · JPL
243324	2008 SN_{65}	—	September 21, 2008	Mount Lemmon	Mount Lemmon Survey	·	1.8 km	MPC · JPL
243325	2008 SR_{154}	—	September 22, 2008	Socorro	LINEAR	L4	13 km	MPC · JPL
243326	2008 SA_{178}	—	September 23, 2008	Catalina	CSS	·	3.5 km	MPC · JPL
243327	2008 SQ_{195}	—	September 25, 2008	Kitt Peak	Spacewatch	(5)	2.4 km	MPC · JPL
243328	2008 SX_{243}	—	September 24, 2008	Kitt Peak	Spacewatch	·	1.5 km	MPC · JPL
243329	2008 SZ_{290}	—	September 23, 2008	Kitt Peak	Spacewatch	·	2.8 km	MPC · JPL
243330	2008 TT_{18}	—	October 1, 2008	Mount Lemmon	Mount Lemmon Survey	(5)	2.6 km	MPC · JPL
243331	2008 TE_{21}	—	October 1, 2008	Mount Lemmon	Mount Lemmon Survey	·	1.4 km	MPC · JPL
243332	2008 TF_{45}	—	October 1, 2008	Mount Lemmon	Mount Lemmon Survey	·	3.1 km	MPC · JPL
243333	2008 TR_{69}	—	October 2, 2008	Kitt Peak	Spacewatch	·	3.0 km	MPC · JPL
243334	2008 TY_{109}	—	October 6, 2008	Mount Lemmon	Mount Lemmon Survey	L4 · ERY	13 km	MPC · JPL
243335	2008 TH_{131}	—	October 8, 2008	Mount Lemmon	Mount Lemmon Survey	·	2.1 km	MPC · JPL
243336	2008 TS_{165}	—	October 4, 2008	Mount Lemmon	Mount Lemmon Survey	·	4.2 km	MPC · JPL
243337	2008 TW_{187}	—	October 8, 2008	Catalina	CSS	·	4.2 km	MPC · JPL
243338	2008 TH_{188}	—	October 9, 2008	Mount Lemmon	Mount Lemmon Survey	·	2.7 km	MPC · JPL
243339	2008 UB_{4}	—	October 23, 2008	Socorro	LINEAR	H	830 m	MPC · JPL
243340	2008 UF_{8}	—	October 17, 2008	Kitt Peak	Spacewatch	·	3.0 km	MPC · JPL
243341	2008 UZ_{77}	—	October 21, 2008	Kitt Peak	Spacewatch	·	5.6 km	MPC · JPL
243342	2008 UF_{107}	—	October 21, 2008	Kitt Peak	Spacewatch	·	3.2 km	MPC · JPL
243343	2008 UY_{117}	—	October 22, 2008	Kitt Peak	Spacewatch	·	3.0 km	MPC · JPL
243344	2008 UA_{134}	—	October 23, 2008	Kitt Peak	Spacewatch	·	1.7 km	MPC · JPL
243345	2008 UZ_{148}	—	October 23, 2008	Kitt Peak	Spacewatch	HOF	3.4 km	MPC · JPL
243346	2008 UF_{157}	—	October 23, 2008	Mount Lemmon	Mount Lemmon Survey	·	2.7 km	MPC · JPL
243347	2008 UU_{160}	—	October 23, 2008	Kitt Peak	Spacewatch	·	5.5 km	MPC · JPL
243348	2008 UC_{199}	—	October 27, 2008	Socorro	LINEAR	·	5.3 km	MPC · JPL
243349	2008 UF_{199}	—	October 28, 2008	Socorro	LINEAR	·	7.6 km	MPC · JPL
243350	2008 UW_{199}	—	October 28, 2008	Goodricke-Pigott	R. A. Tucker	T_{j} (2.97)	5.6 km	MPC · JPL
243351	2008 UP_{215}	—	October 24, 2008	Catalina	CSS	·	2.0 km	MPC · JPL
243352	2008 UP_{229}	—	October 25, 2008	Kitt Peak	Spacewatch	HOF	2.9 km	MPC · JPL
243353	2008 UE_{275}	—	October 28, 2008	Kitt Peak	Spacewatch	·	2.9 km	MPC · JPL
243354	2008 UK_{304}	—	October 29, 2008	Kitt Peak	Spacewatch	·	4.9 km	MPC · JPL
243355	2008 UV_{316}	—	October 30, 2008	Mount Lemmon	Mount Lemmon Survey	·	3.0 km	MPC · JPL
243356	2008 UP_{325}	—	October 31, 2008	Kitt Peak	Spacewatch	·	4.0 km	MPC · JPL
243357	2008 VO_{19}	—	November 1, 2008	Mount Lemmon	Mount Lemmon Survey	·	3.7 km	MPC · JPL
243358	2008 VF_{20}	—	November 1, 2008	Mount Lemmon	Mount Lemmon Survey	·	1.4 km	MPC · JPL
243359	2008 VL_{43}	—	November 3, 2008	Kitt Peak	Spacewatch	BRA	2.5 km	MPC · JPL
243360	2008 VK_{73}	—	November 3, 2008	Kitt Peak	Spacewatch	·	2.3 km	MPC · JPL
243361	2008 WU_{43}	—	November 17, 2008	Kitt Peak	Spacewatch	·	4.2 km	MPC · JPL
243362	2008 WP_{45}	—	November 17, 2008	Kitt Peak	Spacewatch	·	3.0 km	MPC · JPL
243363	2008 WW_{58}	—	November 22, 2008	Mayhill	Lowe, A.	·	6.7 km	MPC · JPL
243364	2008 WY_{59}	—	November 18, 2008	Socorro	LINEAR	EOS	3.3 km	MPC · JPL
243365	2008 WA_{71}	—	November 18, 2008	Kitt Peak	Spacewatch	·	970 m	MPC · JPL
243366	2008 WH_{74}	—	November 19, 2008	Mount Lemmon	Mount Lemmon Survey	·	1.8 km	MPC · JPL
243367	2008 WV_{77}	—	November 20, 2008	Kitt Peak	Spacewatch	LIX	5.1 km	MPC · JPL
243368	2008 WS_{89}	—	November 22, 2008	Kitt Peak	Spacewatch	(5)	2.5 km	MPC · JPL
243369	2008 WC_{102}	—	November 25, 2008	Socorro	LINEAR	H	1.0 km	MPC · JPL
243370	2008 WA_{112}	—	November 30, 2008	Kitt Peak	Spacewatch	·	2.9 km	MPC · JPL
243371	2008 WY_{119}	—	November 30, 2008	Mount Lemmon	Mount Lemmon Survey	THM	3.7 km	MPC · JPL
243372	2008 WN_{128}	—	November 22, 2008	Kitt Peak	Spacewatch	NYS	1.4 km	MPC · JPL
243373	2008 WM_{134}	—	November 22, 2008	Kitt Peak	Spacewatch	·	1.7 km	MPC · JPL
243374	2008 XW_{4}	—	December 3, 2008	Socorro	LINEAR	·	3.8 km	MPC · JPL
243375	2008 XY_{17}	—	December 1, 2008	Kitt Peak	Spacewatch	·	2.6 km	MPC · JPL
243376	2008 XA_{40}	—	December 2, 2008	Kitt Peak	Spacewatch	·	4.7 km	MPC · JPL
243377	2008 XK_{40}	—	December 2, 2008	Kitt Peak	Spacewatch	·	3.7 km	MPC · JPL
243378	2008 XT_{43}	—	December 2, 2008	Kitt Peak	Spacewatch	·	5.8 km	MPC · JPL
243379	2008 XK_{49}	—	December 7, 2008	Mount Lemmon	Mount Lemmon Survey	·	3.0 km	MPC · JPL
243380	2008 XN_{55}	—	December 3, 2008	Mount Lemmon	Mount Lemmon Survey	·	4.6 km	MPC · JPL
243381 Alessio	2008 YM_{4}	Alessio	December 22, 2008	Nazaret	Muler, G., Ruiz, J. M.	PHO	1.9 km	MPC · JPL
243382	2008 YZ_{17}	—	December 21, 2008	Mount Lemmon	Mount Lemmon Survey	DOR	3.3 km	MPC · JPL
243383	2008 YO_{38}	—	December 29, 2008	Kitt Peak	Spacewatch	·	1.7 km	MPC · JPL
243384	2008 YA_{40}	—	December 29, 2008	Kitt Peak	Spacewatch	·	1.5 km	MPC · JPL
243385	2008 YD_{49}	—	December 29, 2008	Mount Lemmon	Mount Lemmon Survey	HYG	3.7 km	MPC · JPL
243386	2008 YP_{51}	—	December 29, 2008	Mount Lemmon	Mount Lemmon Survey	CYB	4.3 km	MPC · JPL
243387	2008 YZ_{52}	—	December 29, 2008	Mount Lemmon	Mount Lemmon Survey	AGN	1.7 km	MPC · JPL
243388	2008 YK_{54}	—	December 29, 2008	Mount Lemmon	Mount Lemmon Survey	·	2.0 km	MPC · JPL
243389	2008 YU_{90}	—	December 29, 2008	Kitt Peak	Spacewatch	·	4.3 km	MPC · JPL
243390	2008 YX_{97}	—	December 29, 2008	Mount Lemmon	Mount Lemmon Survey	HYG	4.7 km	MPC · JPL
243391	2008 YG_{109}	—	December 29, 2008	Kitt Peak	Spacewatch	·	1.6 km	MPC · JPL
243392	2008 YW_{109}	—	December 30, 2008	Kitt Peak	Spacewatch	·	1.0 km	MPC · JPL
243393	2008 YO_{125}	—	December 30, 2008	Kitt Peak	Spacewatch	·	2.1 km	MPC · JPL
243394	2008 YB_{156}	—	December 29, 2008	Mount Lemmon	Mount Lemmon Survey	·	1.5 km	MPC · JPL
243395	2008 YS_{168}	—	December 21, 2008	Kitt Peak	Spacewatch	·	2.2 km	MPC · JPL
243396	2008 YZ_{171}	—	December 30, 2008	Catalina	CSS	·	5.2 km	MPC · JPL
243397	2008 YO_{172}	—	December 31, 2008	Catalina	CSS	TIR	3.8 km	MPC · JPL
243398	2008 YP_{172}	—	December 21, 2008	Mount Lemmon	Mount Lemmon Survey	·	1.2 km	MPC · JPL
243399	2008 YV_{172}	—	December 29, 2008	Kitt Peak	Spacewatch	·	1.3 km	MPC · JPL
243400	2009 AP_{1}	—	January 3, 2009	Farra d'Isonzo	Farra d'Isonzo	PHO	1.9 km	MPC · JPL

== 243401–243500 ==
back to top

Designation			Discovery			Properties		Ref
Permanent	Provisional	Named after	Date	Site	Discoverer(s)	Category	Diam.	Ref
243401	2009 AY_{15}	—	January 15, 2009	Farra d'Isonzo	Farra d'Isonzo	GEF	2.1 km	MPC · JPL
243402	2009 AX_{24}	—	January 3, 2009	Kitt Peak	Spacewatch	CYB	6.4 km	MPC · JPL
243403	2009 AP_{48}	—	January 3, 2009	Mount Lemmon	Mount Lemmon Survey	·	4.0 km	MPC · JPL
243404	2009 BU_{4}	—	January 18, 2009	Socorro	LINEAR	CYB	5.6 km	MPC · JPL
243405	2009 BN_{24}	—	January 17, 2009	Catalina	CSS	·	1.9 km	MPC · JPL
243406	2009 BK_{36}	—	January 16, 2009	Kitt Peak	Spacewatch	·	2.9 km	MPC · JPL
243407	2009 BF_{52}	—	January 16, 2009	Mount Lemmon	Mount Lemmon Survey	·	3.2 km	MPC · JPL
243408	2009 BN_{53}	—	January 16, 2009	Mount Lemmon	Mount Lemmon Survey	·	1.8 km	MPC · JPL
243409	2009 BF_{82}	—	January 20, 2009	Catalina	CSS	·	2.7 km	MPC · JPL
243410	2009 BN_{88}	—	January 25, 2009	Kitt Peak	Spacewatch	·	2.4 km	MPC · JPL
243411	2009 BA_{90}	—	January 25, 2009	Kitt Peak	Spacewatch	·	3.1 km	MPC · JPL
243412	2009 BT_{98}	—	January 26, 2009	Kitt Peak	Spacewatch	THM	2.4 km	MPC · JPL
243413	2009 BH_{111}	—	January 26, 2009	Purple Mountain	PMO NEO Survey Program	·	5.2 km	MPC · JPL
243414	2009 BT_{124}	—	January 31, 2009	Kitt Peak	Spacewatch	·	2.6 km	MPC · JPL
243415	2009 BW_{137}	—	January 29, 2009	Kitt Peak	Spacewatch	·	1.5 km	MPC · JPL
243416	2009 BO_{140}	—	January 29, 2009	Kitt Peak	Spacewatch	·	2.8 km	MPC · JPL
243417	2009 BV_{144}	—	January 30, 2009	Kitt Peak	Spacewatch	·	2.9 km	MPC · JPL
243418	2009 BH_{147}	—	January 30, 2009	Mount Lemmon	Mount Lemmon Survey	·	1.6 km	MPC · JPL
243419	2009 BT_{169}	—	January 17, 2009	Kitt Peak	Spacewatch	·	5.2 km	MPC · JPL
243420	2009 BA_{178}	—	January 31, 2009	Mount Lemmon	Mount Lemmon Survey	·	1.6 km	MPC · JPL
243421	2009 BC_{187}	—	January 26, 2009	Socorro	LINEAR	·	5.2 km	MPC · JPL
243422	2009 BA_{188}	—	January 21, 2009	Socorro	LINEAR	·	2.8 km	MPC · JPL
243423	2009 CP_{7}	—	February 1, 2009	Mount Lemmon	Mount Lemmon Survey	·	1.6 km	MPC · JPL
243424	2009 CT_{27}	—	February 1, 2009	Kitt Peak	Spacewatch	·	4.3 km	MPC · JPL
243425	2009 CA_{50}	—	February 14, 2009	La Sagra	OAM	·	3.4 km	MPC · JPL
243426	2009 CL_{53}	—	February 13, 2009	La Sagra	OAM	·	1.9 km	MPC · JPL
243427	2009 CS_{56}	—	February 4, 2009	Mount Lemmon	Mount Lemmon Survey	·	5.5 km	MPC · JPL
243428	2009 CL_{58}	—	February 3, 2009	Kitt Peak	Spacewatch	·	3.8 km	MPC · JPL
243429	2009 CA_{63}	—	February 4, 2009	Mount Lemmon	Mount Lemmon Survey	·	4.3 km	MPC · JPL
243430	2009 DQ_{1}	—	February 16, 2009	Dauban	Kugel, F.	·	1.5 km	MPC · JPL
243431	2009 DK_{32}	—	February 20, 2009	Kitt Peak	Spacewatch	·	2.1 km	MPC · JPL
243432	2009 DO_{41}	—	February 18, 2009	La Sagra	OAM	·	2.6 km	MPC · JPL
243433	2009 DY_{44}	—	February 27, 2009	Mayhill	Lowe, A.	·	3.3 km	MPC · JPL
243434	2009 DB_{46}	—	February 19, 2009	Marly	P. Kocher	·	3.9 km	MPC · JPL
243435	2009 DL_{55}	—	February 22, 2009	Kitt Peak	Spacewatch	HOF	3.8 km	MPC · JPL
243436	2009 DQ_{57}	—	February 22, 2009	Kitt Peak	Spacewatch	·	3.8 km	MPC · JPL
243437	2009 DF_{58}	—	February 22, 2009	Kitt Peak	Spacewatch	MAS	1.3 km	MPC · JPL
243438	2009 DV_{66}	—	February 24, 2009	Mount Lemmon	Mount Lemmon Survey	3:2	4.4 km	MPC · JPL
243439	2009 DZ_{112}	—	February 27, 2009	Catalina	CSS	·	1.1 km	MPC · JPL
243440 Colonia	2009 FD_{2}	Colonia	March 17, 2009	Taunus	Karge, S., E. Schwab	·	2.4 km	MPC · JPL
243441	2009 FO_{3}	—	March 17, 2009	La Sagra	OAM	·	2.3 km	MPC · JPL
243442	2009 FS_{6}	—	March 16, 2009	Kitt Peak	Spacewatch	·	2.1 km	MPC · JPL
243443	2009 FD_{18}	—	March 18, 2009	La Sagra	OAM	·	5.3 km	MPC · JPL
243444	2009 FQ_{41}	—	March 23, 2009	La Sagra	OAM	V	1.0 km	MPC · JPL
243445	2009 FD_{45}	—	March 26, 2009	Kitt Peak	Spacewatch	·	3.5 km	MPC · JPL
243446	2009 FX_{56}	—	March 25, 2009	Siding Spring	SSS	EUP	6.7 km	MPC · JPL
243447	2009 GE	—	April 2, 2009	Sierra Stars	Tozzi, F.	·	3.6 km	MPC · JPL
243448	2009 HD_{16}	—	April 18, 2009	Kitt Peak	Spacewatch	DOR	3.8 km	MPC · JPL
243449	2009 HP_{19}	—	April 18, 2009	Cordell-Lorenz	D. T. Durig	·	3.5 km	MPC · JPL
243450	2009 HY_{21}	—	April 16, 2009	Catalina	CSS	EOS	2.9 km	MPC · JPL
243451	2009 HL_{60}	—	April 21, 2009	Socorro	LINEAR	·	3.6 km	MPC · JPL
243452	2009 HD_{73}	—	April 19, 2009	Kitt Peak	Spacewatch	·	6.0 km	MPC · JPL
243453	2009 HX_{85}	—	April 29, 2009	Kitt Peak	Spacewatch	L5	15 km	MPC · JPL
243454	2009 HH_{92}	—	April 29, 2009	Kitt Peak	Spacewatch	HOF	4.2 km	MPC · JPL
243455	2009 JJ_{2}	—	May 12, 2009	Mayhill	Lowe, A.	·	2.7 km	MPC · JPL
243456	2009 JR_{3}	—	May 13, 2009	Catalina	CSS	·	2.7 km	MPC · JPL
243457	2009 JA_{18}	—	May 3, 2009	Kitt Peak	Spacewatch	·	3.0 km	MPC · JPL
243458 Bubulina	2009 QQ_{38}	Bubulina	August 31, 2009	Skylive	Tozzi, F., Graziani, M.	·	2.8 km	MPC · JPL
243459	2009 RZ_{16}	—	September 12, 2009	Kitt Peak	Spacewatch	·	2.3 km	MPC · JPL
243460	2009 RA_{54}	—	September 15, 2009	Kitt Peak	Spacewatch	L4	14 km	MPC · JPL
243461	2009 SF_{21}	—	September 17, 2009	Catalina	CSS	·	1.0 km	MPC · JPL
243462	2009 ST_{42}	—	September 16, 2009	Kitt Peak	Spacewatch	·	2.7 km	MPC · JPL
243463	2009 SF_{44}	—	September 16, 2009	Kitt Peak	Spacewatch	HYG	4.4 km	MPC · JPL
243464	2009 SC_{49}	—	September 17, 2009	La Sagra	OAM	·	3.8 km	MPC · JPL
243465	2009 SN_{100}	—	September 18, 2009	Catalina	CSS	·	2.0 km	MPC · JPL
243466	2009 SE_{104}	—	September 25, 2009	Taunus	Karge, S., R. Kling	·	6.3 km	MPC · JPL
243467	2009 SE_{124}	—	September 18, 2009	Kitt Peak	Spacewatch	·	3.8 km	MPC · JPL
243468	2009 SZ_{146}	—	September 19, 2009	Kitt Peak	Spacewatch	KON	2.8 km	MPC · JPL
243469	2009 SY_{158}	—	September 20, 2009	Kitt Peak	Spacewatch	·	4.8 km	MPC · JPL
243470	2009 SR_{175}	—	September 19, 2009	Catalina	CSS	EUP	6.1 km	MPC · JPL
243471	2009 SO_{213}	—	September 23, 2009	Kitt Peak	Spacewatch	·	3.0 km	MPC · JPL
243472	2009 SD_{214}	—	September 23, 2009	Kitt Peak	Spacewatch	·	3.8 km	MPC · JPL
243473	2009 SO_{241}	—	September 18, 2009	Catalina	CSS	·	3.5 km	MPC · JPL
243474	2009 SH_{264}	—	September 23, 2009	Mount Lemmon	Mount Lemmon Survey	·	2.9 km	MPC · JPL
243475	2009 SB_{265}	—	September 23, 2009	Mount Lemmon	Mount Lemmon Survey	·	5.2 km	MPC · JPL
243476	2009 SZ_{289}	—	September 25, 2009	Kitt Peak	Spacewatch	HOF	4.2 km	MPC · JPL
243477	2009 SP_{293}	—	September 26, 2009	Kitt Peak	Spacewatch	·	1.4 km	MPC · JPL
243478	2009 SY_{329}	—	September 17, 2009	Kitt Peak	Spacewatch	·	5.1 km	MPC · JPL
243479	2009 TY_{5}	—	October 11, 2009	La Sagra	OAM	L4	11 km	MPC · JPL
243480	2009 TQ_{9}	—	October 14, 2009	Bisei SG Center	BATTeRS	NEM	2.7 km	MPC · JPL
243481	2009 TW_{14}	—	October 14, 2009	La Sagra	OAM	·	2.8 km	MPC · JPL
243482	2009 TY_{14}	—	October 12, 2009	La Sagra	OAM	·	3.4 km	MPC · JPL
243483	2009 TW_{17}	—	October 15, 2009	Catalina	CSS	·	5.1 km	MPC · JPL
243484	2009 TA_{23}	—	October 14, 2009	La Sagra	OAM	L4	13 km	MPC · JPL
243485	2009 TH_{26}	—	October 14, 2009	Purple Mountain	PMO NEO Survey Program	·	5.7 km	MPC · JPL
243486	2009 TQ_{34}	—	October 12, 2009	La Sagra	OAM	·	6.4 km	MPC · JPL
243487	2009 TB_{38}	—	October 14, 2009	Catalina	CSS	·	4.5 km	MPC · JPL
243488	2009 TB_{41}	—	October 14, 2009	Purple Mountain	PMO NEO Survey Program	·	3.8 km	MPC · JPL
243489	2009 UX_{11}	—	October 16, 2009	Catalina	CSS	·	5.3 km	MPC · JPL
243490	2009 UF_{19}	—	October 23, 2009	Mayhill	Mayhill	L4	19 km	MPC · JPL
243491 Mühlviertel	2009 UH_{19}	Mühlviertel	October 20, 2009	Linz	Voglsam, D.	·	2.7 km	MPC · JPL
243492	2009 UB_{26}	—	October 21, 2009	Catalina	CSS	·	3.2 km	MPC · JPL
243493	2009 UY_{39}	—	October 22, 2009	Mount Lemmon	Mount Lemmon Survey	·	2.1 km	MPC · JPL
243494	2009 UF_{74}	—	October 21, 2009	Mount Lemmon	Mount Lemmon Survey	L4	11 km	MPC · JPL
243495	2009 UB_{102}	—	October 24, 2009	Catalina	CSS	·	3.3 km	MPC · JPL
243496	2009 UV_{105}	—	October 21, 2009	Mount Lemmon	Mount Lemmon Survey	L4	15 km	MPC · JPL
243497	2009 UR_{122}	—	October 26, 2009	Mount Lemmon	Mount Lemmon Survey	·	3.6 km	MPC · JPL
243498	2009 US_{130}	—	October 26, 2009	Catalina	CSS	·	5.1 km	MPC · JPL
243499	2009 UA_{131}	—	October 30, 2009	Mount Lemmon	Mount Lemmon Survey	L4	13 km	MPC · JPL
243500	2009 UK_{139}	—	October 27, 2009	Mount Lemmon	Mount Lemmon Survey	VER	4.4 km	MPC · JPL

== 243501–243600 ==
back to top

Designation			Discovery			Properties		Ref
Permanent	Provisional	Named after	Date	Site	Discoverer(s)	Category	Diam.	Ref
243501	2009 UR_{139}	—	October 24, 2009	Mount Lemmon	Mount Lemmon Survey	L4	15 km	MPC · JPL
243502	2009 UE_{140}	—	October 25, 2009	Kitt Peak	Spacewatch	HYG	3.0 km	MPC · JPL
243503	2009 VS_{26}	—	November 8, 2009	Kitt Peak	Spacewatch	·	4.2 km	MPC · JPL
243504	2009 VD_{77}	—	November 8, 2009	Catalina	CSS	L4	12 km	MPC · JPL
243505	2009 VG_{106}	—	November 9, 2009	Catalina	CSS	·	2.4 km	MPC · JPL
243506	2009 WS	—	November 16, 2009	Calvin-Rehoboth	L. A. Molnar	·	3.5 km	MPC · JPL
243507	2009 WT_{26}	—	November 16, 2009	Kitt Peak	Spacewatch	·	2.7 km	MPC · JPL
243508	2009 WM_{71}	—	November 18, 2009	Kitt Peak	Spacewatch	·	1.7 km	MPC · JPL
243509	2009 WB_{80}	—	November 18, 2009	Kitt Peak	Spacewatch	L4	11 km	MPC · JPL
243510	2009 WE_{84}	—	November 19, 2009	Kitt Peak	Spacewatch	HYG	2.6 km	MPC · JPL
243511	2009 WF_{129}	—	November 20, 2009	Mount Lemmon	Mount Lemmon Survey	KRM	3.2 km	MPC · JPL
243512	2009 YF_{10}	—	December 17, 2009	Kitt Peak	Spacewatch	·	3.2 km	MPC · JPL
243513	2009 YL_{15}	—	December 18, 2009	Kitt Peak	Spacewatch	·	4.1 km	MPC · JPL
243514	2010 AT_{58}	—	January 11, 2010	Kitt Peak	Spacewatch	·	4.4 km	MPC · JPL
243515	2010 AT_{66}	—	January 11, 2010	Kitt Peak	Spacewatch	·	4.1 km	MPC · JPL
243516 Marklarsen	2010 CC_{7}	Marklarsen	February 6, 2010	WISE	WISE	·	3.7 km	MPC · JPL
243517	2010 CD_{32}	—	February 9, 2010	Kitt Peak	Spacewatch	·	4.5 km	MPC · JPL
243518	2010 CK_{34}	—	February 10, 2010	Kitt Peak	Spacewatch	·	2.3 km	MPC · JPL
243519	2010 CX_{34}	—	February 10, 2010	Kitt Peak	Spacewatch	·	3.4 km	MPC · JPL
243520	2010 CH_{44}	—	February 14, 2010	Calvin-Rehoboth	Calvin College	·	2.8 km	MPC · JPL
243521	2010 CF_{63}	—	February 9, 2010	Kitt Peak	Spacewatch	·	3.8 km	MPC · JPL
243522	2010 CA_{124}	—	February 15, 2010	Catalina	CSS	EUN	2.3 km	MPC · JPL
243523	2010 CO_{138}	—	February 13, 2010	Kitt Peak	Spacewatch	DOR	3.8 km	MPC · JPL
243524	2010 DG_{8}	—	February 16, 2010	Kitt Peak	Spacewatch	·	3.4 km	MPC · JPL
243525	2010 DY_{8}	—	February 16, 2010	Kitt Peak	Spacewatch	CYB	6.4 km	MPC · JPL
243526 Russwalker	2010 DY_{28}	Russwalker	February 19, 2010	WISE	WISE	TIR ·	5.5 km	MPC · JPL
243527	2010 DZ_{42}	—	February 17, 2010	Kitt Peak	Spacewatch	·	2.8 km	MPC · JPL
243528	2010 DV_{46}	—	February 17, 2010	Kitt Peak	Spacewatch	·	2.0 km	MPC · JPL
243529 Petereisenhardt	2010 DO_{50}	Petereisenhardt	February 20, 2010	WISE	WISE	·	5.4 km	MPC · JPL
243530	2010 DR_{78}	—	February 17, 2010	Siding Spring	SSS	·	4.4 km	MPC · JPL
243531	2010 EV_{29}	—	March 5, 2010	Catalina	CSS	·	5.6 km	MPC · JPL
243532	2010 EE_{30}	—	March 5, 2010	Catalina	CSS	·	3.0 km	MPC · JPL
243533	2010 EH_{34}	—	March 5, 2010	Kitt Peak	Spacewatch	·	3.6 km	MPC · JPL
243534	2010 EO_{40}	—	March 12, 2010	Catalina	CSS	·	2.2 km	MPC · JPL
243535	2010 ET_{87}	—	March 13, 2010	Mount Lemmon	Mount Lemmon Survey	EUN	2.1 km	MPC · JPL
243536 Mannheim	2010 EQ_{111}	Mannheim	March 15, 2010	Moorook	E. Schwab	·	3.5 km	MPC · JPL
243537	2010 EL_{125}	—	March 13, 2010	Kitt Peak	Spacewatch	·	3.4 km	MPC · JPL
243538	2010 FG_{21}	—	March 18, 2010	Mount Lemmon	Mount Lemmon Survey	·	5.5 km	MPC · JPL
243539	2010 FA_{56}	—	March 19, 2010	Kitt Peak	Spacewatch	·	2.1 km	MPC · JPL
243540	2010 GH_{75}	—	April 7, 2010	Catalina	CSS	·	3.0 km	MPC · JPL
243541	2010 GL_{75}	—	April 11, 2010	Mount Lemmon	Mount Lemmon Survey	·	2.6 km	MPC · JPL
243542	2010 JT_{1}	—	May 3, 2010	Kitt Peak	Spacewatch	·	1.8 km	MPC · JPL
243543	2010 JB_{29}	—	May 2, 2010	Kitt Peak	Spacewatch	·	3.1 km	MPC · JPL
243544	2010 JD_{29}	—	May 2, 2010	Kitt Peak	Spacewatch	·	1.5 km	MPC · JPL
243545	2010 JO_{29}	—	May 3, 2010	Kitt Peak	Spacewatch	·	1.9 km	MPC · JPL
243546 Fengchuanliu	2010 JH_{61}	Fengchuanliu	May 8, 2010	WISE	WISE	·	4.4 km	MPC · JPL
243547	2010 JU_{71}	—	May 3, 2010	Kitt Peak	Spacewatch	·	1.8 km	MPC · JPL
243548	2010 JN_{73}	—	May 8, 2010	Mount Lemmon	Mount Lemmon Survey	·	1.9 km	MPC · JPL
243549	2010 JF_{158}	—	May 14, 2010	Mount Lemmon	Mount Lemmon Survey	·	2.0 km	MPC · JPL
243550	1240 T-2	—	September 29, 1973	Palomar	C. J. van Houten, I. van Houten-Groeneveld, T. Gehrels	·	6.9 km	MPC · JPL
243551	3266 T-3	—	October 16, 1977	Palomar	C. J. van Houten, I. van Houten-Groeneveld, T. Gehrels	·	2.7 km	MPC · JPL
243552	4514 T-3	—	October 16, 1977	Palomar	C. J. van Houten, I. van Houten-Groeneveld, T. Gehrels	·	5.1 km	MPC · JPL
243553	5066 T-3	—	October 16, 1977	Palomar	C. J. van Houten, I. van Houten-Groeneveld, T. Gehrels	·	3.4 km	MPC · JPL
243554	1981 EL_{30}	—	March 2, 1981	Siding Spring	S. J. Bus	·	5.6 km	MPC · JPL
243555	1991 VB_{8}	—	November 4, 1991	Kitt Peak	Spacewatch	EOS	2.3 km	MPC · JPL
243556	1993 HT_{3}	—	April 20, 1993	Kitt Peak	Spacewatch	·	5.2 km	MPC · JPL
243557	1993 HF_{4}	—	April 20, 1993	Kitt Peak	Spacewatch	V	860 m	MPC · JPL
243558	1993 TJ_{28}	—	October 9, 1993	La Silla	E. W. Elst	EUN	1.8 km	MPC · JPL
243559	1993 TR_{37}	—	October 9, 1993	La Silla	E. W. Elst	·	2.1 km	MPC · JPL
243560	1994 PO_{5}	—	August 10, 1994	La Silla	E. W. Elst	EUN	2.5 km	MPC · JPL
243561	1994 YD_{4}	—	December 31, 1994	Kitt Peak	Spacewatch	·	1.7 km	MPC · JPL
243562	1995 BA_{8}	—	January 29, 1995	Kitt Peak	Spacewatch	·	4.9 km	MPC · JPL
243563	1995 FU_{14}	—	March 27, 1995	Kitt Peak	Spacewatch	NYS	1.1 km	MPC · JPL
243564	1995 ML_{8}	—	June 29, 1995	Kitt Peak	Spacewatch	·	1.2 km	MPC · JPL
243565	1995 OU_{7}	—	July 25, 1995	Kitt Peak	Spacewatch	EOS	5.6 km	MPC · JPL
243566	1995 SA	—	September 17, 1995	Kitt Peak	Spacewatch	APO +1km · PHA	880 m	MPC · JPL
243567	1995 SP_{23}	—	September 19, 1995	Kitt Peak	Spacewatch	·	3.6 km	MPC · JPL
243568	1995 SX_{85}	—	September 26, 1995	Kitt Peak	Spacewatch	EOS	2.2 km	MPC · JPL
243569	1995 XN_{4}	—	December 14, 1995	Kitt Peak	Spacewatch	GEF	2.3 km	MPC · JPL
243570	1995 XR_{4}	—	December 14, 1995	Kitt Peak	Spacewatch	·	1.9 km	MPC · JPL
243571	1996 AS_{6}	—	January 12, 1996	Kitt Peak	Spacewatch	·	1.9 km	MPC · JPL
243572	1996 GA_{9}	—	April 13, 1996	Kitt Peak	Spacewatch	NYS	2.4 km	MPC · JPL
243573	1996 LF_{2}	—	June 8, 1996	Kitt Peak	Spacewatch	·	1.2 km	MPC · JPL
243574	1996 RO_{7}	—	September 5, 1996	Kitt Peak	Spacewatch	·	2.8 km	MPC · JPL
243575	1996 VW_{17}	—	November 6, 1996	Kitt Peak	Spacewatch	·	2.3 km	MPC · JPL
243576	1996 VB_{39}	—	November 7, 1996	Xinglong	SCAP	·	3.6 km	MPC · JPL
243577	1996 WE	—	November 16, 1996	Sudbury	D. di Cicco	·	2.8 km	MPC · JPL
243578	1996 XO_{12}	—	December 6, 1996	Kitt Peak	Spacewatch	EOS	2.9 km	MPC · JPL
243579	1997 NC_{6}	—	July 9, 1997	Kitt Peak	Spacewatch	·	1.4 km	MPC · JPL
243580	1997 PG_{1}	—	August 5, 1997	Costitx	Á. López J., R. Pacheco	BAR	1.5 km	MPC · JPL
243581	1997 RH_{6}	—	September 7, 1997	Caussols	ODAS	·	780 m	MPC · JPL
243582	1997 SZ_{7}	—	September 23, 1997	Kitt Peak	Spacewatch	V	670 m	MPC · JPL
243583	1997 TU_{19}	—	October 2, 1997	Kitt Peak	Spacewatch	·	880 m	MPC · JPL
243584	1997 TU_{20}	—	October 4, 1997	Kitt Peak	Spacewatch	MIS	2.7 km	MPC · JPL
243585	1997 WY_{28}	—	November 29, 1997	Kitt Peak	Spacewatch	·	1.5 km	MPC · JPL
243586	1997 YN_{12}	—	December 21, 1997	Kitt Peak	Spacewatch	V	1.2 km	MPC · JPL
243587	1998 DU_{9}	—	February 22, 1998	Haleakala	NEAT	·	1.0 km	MPC · JPL
243588	1998 MA_{6}	—	June 19, 1998	Kitt Peak	Spacewatch	·	5.5 km	MPC · JPL
243589	1998 QP_{3}	—	August 17, 1998	Socorro	LINEAR	·	2.6 km	MPC · JPL
243590	1998 QY_{82}	—	August 24, 1998	Socorro	LINEAR	·	2.2 km	MPC · JPL
243591 Ignacostantino	1998 RG_{3}	Ignacostantino	September 15, 1998	Colleverde	V. S. Casulli	·	2.8 km	MPC · JPL
243592	1998 RQ_{4}	—	September 14, 1998	Socorro	LINEAR	·	5.2 km	MPC · JPL
243593	1998 RO_{10}	—	September 13, 1998	Kitt Peak	Spacewatch	·	1.8 km	MPC · JPL
243594	1998 RH_{37}	—	September 14, 1998	Socorro	LINEAR	(5)	1.9 km	MPC · JPL
243595	1998 RS_{79}	—	September 14, 1998	Socorro	LINEAR	·	1.6 km	MPC · JPL
243596	1998 ST_{79}	—	September 26, 1998	Socorro	LINEAR	TIN	1.8 km	MPC · JPL
243597	1998 SK_{83}	—	September 26, 1998	Socorro	LINEAR	·	1.8 km	MPC · JPL
243598	1998 SS_{99}	—	September 26, 1998	Socorro	LINEAR	EUN	1.7 km	MPC · JPL
243599	1998 SX_{153}	—	September 26, 1998	Socorro	LINEAR	·	1.5 km	MPC · JPL
243600	1998 SV_{154}	—	September 26, 1998	Socorro	LINEAR	·	1.6 km	MPC · JPL

== 243601–243700 ==
back to top

Designation			Discovery			Properties		Ref
Permanent	Provisional	Named after	Date	Site	Discoverer(s)	Category	Diam.	Ref
243601	1998 SV_{168}	—	September 17, 1998	Anderson Mesa	LONEOS	·	990 m	MPC · JPL
243602	1998 UF_{10}	—	October 16, 1998	Kitt Peak	Spacewatch	·	790 m	MPC · JPL
243603	1998 VG_{43}	—	November 15, 1998	Kitt Peak	Spacewatch	NYS	840 m	MPC · JPL
243604	1998 WV_{25}	—	November 16, 1998	Kitt Peak	Spacewatch	·	1.8 km	MPC · JPL
243605	1998 WO_{29}	—	November 23, 1998	Kitt Peak	Spacewatch	(12739)	1.9 km	MPC · JPL
243606	1998 WY_{36}	—	November 21, 1998	Kitt Peak	Spacewatch	·	2.1 km	MPC · JPL
243607	1998 WJ_{42}	—	November 19, 1998	Caussols	ODAS	fast	2.2 km	MPC · JPL
243608	1998 XE_{23}	—	December 11, 1998	Kitt Peak	Spacewatch	·	930 m	MPC · JPL
243609	1998 YY_{11}	—	December 26, 1998	Oizumi	T. Kobayashi	·	4.3 km	MPC · JPL
243610	1998 YR_{13}	—	December 19, 1998	Kitt Peak	Spacewatch	·	2.3 km	MPC · JPL
243611	1999 AS_{1}	—	January 8, 1999	Kitt Peak	Spacewatch	·	3.4 km	MPC · JPL
243612	1999 BQ_{8}	—	January 16, 1999	Kitt Peak	Spacewatch	·	680 m	MPC · JPL
243613	1999 CP_{115}	—	February 12, 1999	Socorro	LINEAR	·	1.7 km	MPC · JPL
243614	1999 CN_{132}	—	February 8, 1999	Kitt Peak	Spacewatch	·	1.1 km	MPC · JPL
243615	1999 FP_{2}	—	March 16, 1999	Kitt Peak	Spacewatch	·	3.4 km	MPC · JPL
243616	1999 FQ_{76}	—	March 20, 1999	Apache Point	SDSS	·	4.2 km	MPC · JPL
243617	1999 GT_{54}	—	April 6, 1999	Kitt Peak	Spacewatch	·	2.7 km	MPC · JPL
243618	1999 JU_{61}	—	May 10, 1999	Socorro	LINEAR	·	2.5 km	MPC · JPL
243619	1999 KK_{9}	—	May 18, 1999	Socorro	LINEAR	·	3.2 km	MPC · JPL
243620	1999 LC_{5}	—	June 8, 1999	Socorro	LINEAR	·	4.3 km	MPC · JPL
243621	1999 RN_{15}	—	September 7, 1999	Socorro	LINEAR	·	6.0 km	MPC · JPL
243622	1999 RF_{16}	—	September 7, 1999	Socorro	LINEAR	EOS	3.2 km	MPC · JPL
243623	1999 RY_{22}	—	September 7, 1999	Socorro	LINEAR	NYS	1.7 km	MPC · JPL
243624	1999 RF_{37}	—	September 12, 1999	Monte Agliale	Santangelo, M. M. M.	·	3.2 km	MPC · JPL
243625	1999 RA_{88}	—	September 7, 1999	Socorro	LINEAR	·	2.5 km	MPC · JPL
243626	1999 RP_{114}	—	September 9, 1999	Socorro	LINEAR	·	3.7 km	MPC · JPL
243627	1999 RH_{124}	—	September 9, 1999	Socorro	LINEAR	·	6.0 km	MPC · JPL
243628	1999 RG_{131}	—	September 9, 1999	Socorro	LINEAR	·	5.1 km	MPC · JPL
243629	1999 RX_{201}	—	September 8, 1999	Socorro	LINEAR	·	2.8 km	MPC · JPL
243630	1999 RX_{202}	—	September 8, 1999	Socorro	LINEAR	·	2.5 km	MPC · JPL
243631	1999 RP_{203}	—	September 8, 1999	Socorro	LINEAR	·	4.8 km	MPC · JPL
243632	1999 RZ_{206}	—	September 8, 1999	Socorro	LINEAR	·	4.2 km	MPC · JPL
243633	1999 RL_{239}	—	September 8, 1999	Socorro	LINEAR	·	6.7 km	MPC · JPL
243634	1999 SH_{12}	—	September 27, 1999	Socorro	LINEAR	·	6.8 km	MPC · JPL
243635	1999 SD_{16}	—	September 29, 1999	Catalina	CSS	TIR	2.7 km	MPC · JPL
243636	1999 SD_{17}	—	September 30, 1999	Catalina	CSS	·	2.0 km	MPC · JPL
243637 Frosinone	1999 TZ_{10}	Frosinone	October 8, 1999	Ceccano	G. Masi	·	1.5 km	MPC · JPL
243638	1999 TE_{28}	—	October 3, 1999	Socorro	LINEAR	·	2.5 km	MPC · JPL
243639	1999 TO_{51}	—	October 4, 1999	Kitt Peak	Spacewatch	·	4.4 km	MPC · JPL
243640	1999 TG_{53}	—	October 6, 1999	Kitt Peak	Spacewatch	·	1.5 km	MPC · JPL
243641	1999 TN_{61}	—	October 7, 1999	Kitt Peak	Spacewatch	·	1.9 km	MPC · JPL
243642	1999 TL_{101}	—	October 2, 1999	Socorro	LINEAR	·	2.5 km	MPC · JPL
243643	1999 TT_{110}	—	October 4, 1999	Socorro	LINEAR	·	3.6 km	MPC · JPL
243644	1999 TY_{135}	—	October 6, 1999	Socorro	LINEAR	EUP	5.3 km	MPC · JPL
243645	1999 TE_{137}	—	October 6, 1999	Socorro	LINEAR	WIT	1.4 km	MPC · JPL
243646	1999 TT_{147}	—	October 7, 1999	Socorro	LINEAR	·	1.8 km	MPC · JPL
243647	1999 TZ_{153}	—	October 7, 1999	Socorro	LINEAR	·	1.7 km	MPC · JPL
243648	1999 TX_{176}	—	October 10, 1999	Socorro	LINEAR	·	2.6 km	MPC · JPL
243649	1999 TS_{190}	—	October 12, 1999	Socorro	LINEAR	·	3.3 km	MPC · JPL
243650	1999 TL_{240}	—	October 4, 1999	Catalina	CSS	TIR	3.4 km	MPC · JPL
243651	1999 TV_{253}	—	October 11, 1999	Socorro	LINEAR	(5)	1.4 km	MPC · JPL
243652	1999 TG_{254}	—	October 13, 1999	Kitt Peak	Spacewatch	·	2.1 km	MPC · JPL
243653	1999 TD_{265}	—	October 3, 1999	Socorro	LINEAR	·	5.3 km	MPC · JPL
243654	1999 TO_{289}	—	October 10, 1999	Socorro	LINEAR	·	2.6 km	MPC · JPL
243655	1999 US_{25}	—	October 29, 1999	Catalina	CSS	·	1.5 km	MPC · JPL
243656	1999 UP_{43}	—	October 28, 1999	Catalina	CSS	·	2.2 km	MPC · JPL
243657	1999 UX_{45}	—	October 31, 1999	Catalina	CSS	·	3.6 km	MPC · JPL
243658	1999 UC_{52}	—	October 31, 1999	Catalina	CSS	·	5.2 km	MPC · JPL
243659	1999 UT_{57}	—	October 31, 1999	Catalina	CSS	·	2.2 km	MPC · JPL
243660	1999 VU_{13}	—	November 2, 1999	Socorro	LINEAR	·	2.2 km	MPC · JPL
243661	1999 VX_{13}	—	November 2, 1999	Socorro	LINEAR	·	4.6 km	MPC · JPL
243662	1999 VW_{71}	—	November 15, 1999	Eskridge	Farpoint	·	4.2 km	MPC · JPL
243663	1999 VU_{76}	—	November 5, 1999	Kitt Peak	Spacewatch	·	2.3 km	MPC · JPL
243664	1999 VQ_{80}	—	November 4, 1999	Socorro	LINEAR	BRU	2.9 km	MPC · JPL
243665	1999 VZ_{80}	—	November 4, 1999	Socorro	LINEAR	·	2.5 km	MPC · JPL
243666	1999 VO_{83}	—	November 2, 1999	Kitt Peak	Spacewatch	·	3.5 km	MPC · JPL
243667	1999 VR_{84}	—	November 6, 1999	Kitt Peak	Spacewatch	·	2.5 km	MPC · JPL
243668	1999 VF_{85}	—	November 6, 1999	Kitt Peak	Spacewatch	VER	3.5 km	MPC · JPL
243669	1999 VG_{106}	—	November 9, 1999	Socorro	LINEAR	HYG	5.5 km	MPC · JPL
243670	1999 VV_{130}	—	November 9, 1999	Kitt Peak	Spacewatch	·	1.6 km	MPC · JPL
243671	1999 VU_{148}	—	November 14, 1999	Socorro	LINEAR	·	1.6 km	MPC · JPL
243672	1999 VR_{166}	—	November 14, 1999	Socorro	LINEAR	·	1.6 km	MPC · JPL
243673	1999 VR_{192}	—	November 1, 1999	Anderson Mesa	LONEOS	THB	4.9 km	MPC · JPL
243674	1999 VV_{199}	—	November 4, 1999	Anderson Mesa	LONEOS	·	4.3 km	MPC · JPL
243675	1999 VG_{207}	—	November 11, 1999	Kitt Peak	Spacewatch	·	5.1 km	MPC · JPL
243676	1999 WQ_{10}	—	November 28, 1999	Kitt Peak	Spacewatch	·	3.0 km	MPC · JPL
243677	1999 WW_{15}	—	November 29, 1999	Kitt Peak	Spacewatch	·	1.4 km	MPC · JPL
243678	1999 WH_{20}	—	November 16, 1999	Socorro	LINEAR	·	5.3 km	MPC · JPL
243679	1999 XV_{29}	—	December 6, 1999	Socorro	LINEAR	·	2.5 km	MPC · JPL
243680	1999 XU_{65}	—	December 7, 1999	Socorro	LINEAR	·	1.6 km	MPC · JPL
243681	1999 XK_{80}	—	December 7, 1999	Socorro	LINEAR	·	3.3 km	MPC · JPL
243682	1999 XL_{92}	—	December 7, 1999	Socorro	LINEAR	(5)	2.7 km	MPC · JPL
243683	1999 XE_{99}	—	December 7, 1999	Socorro	LINEAR	·	3.4 km	MPC · JPL
243684	1999 XZ_{134}	—	December 6, 1999	Socorro	LINEAR	GAL	2.5 km	MPC · JPL
243685	1999 XB_{135}	—	December 6, 1999	Socorro	LINEAR	T_{j} (2.97)	4.4 km	MPC · JPL
243686	1999 XD_{138}	—	December 2, 1999	Kitt Peak	Spacewatch	·	2.1 km	MPC · JPL
243687	1999 XU_{146}	—	December 7, 1999	Kitt Peak	Spacewatch	·	2.2 km	MPC · JPL
243688	1999 XX_{171}	—	December 10, 1999	Socorro	LINEAR	·	3.2 km	MPC · JPL
243689	1999 XO_{172}	—	December 10, 1999	Socorro	LINEAR	·	2.4 km	MPC · JPL
243690	1999 XA_{219}	—	December 15, 1999	Kitt Peak	Spacewatch	·	3.3 km	MPC · JPL
243691	1999 YK_{10}	—	December 27, 1999	Kitt Peak	Spacewatch	(5)	2.5 km	MPC · JPL
243692	1999 YJ_{26}	—	December 31, 1999	Kitt Peak	Spacewatch	·	1.4 km	MPC · JPL
243693	2000 AC_{43}	—	January 5, 2000	Socorro	LINEAR	·	5.4 km	MPC · JPL
243694	2000 AO_{44}	—	January 5, 2000	Kitt Peak	Spacewatch	·	2.0 km	MPC · JPL
243695	2000 AJ_{72}	—	January 5, 2000	Socorro	LINEAR	·	2.2 km	MPC · JPL
243696	2000 AA_{73}	—	January 5, 2000	Socorro	LINEAR	·	1.9 km	MPC · JPL
243697	2000 BY_{1}	—	January 27, 2000	Kitt Peak	Spacewatch	·	6.2 km	MPC · JPL
243698	2000 BH_{5}	—	January 27, 2000	Socorro	LINEAR	·	2.6 km	MPC · JPL
243699	2000 BM_{31}	—	January 29, 2000	Kitt Peak	Spacewatch	·	3.6 km	MPC · JPL
243700	2000 BU_{41}	—	January 30, 2000	Kitt Peak	Spacewatch	·	3.8 km	MPC · JPL

== 243701–243800 ==
back to top

Designation			Discovery			Properties		Ref
Permanent	Provisional	Named after	Date	Site	Discoverer(s)	Category	Diam.	Ref
243701	2000 CD_{9}	—	February 2, 2000	Socorro	LINEAR	·	2.0 km	MPC · JPL
243702	2000 CL_{47}	—	February 2, 2000	Socorro	LINEAR	(5)	1.8 km	MPC · JPL
243703	2000 CO_{57}	—	February 5, 2000	Socorro	LINEAR	·	4.2 km	MPC · JPL
243704	2000 CT_{64}	—	February 3, 2000	Socorro	LINEAR	·	3.1 km	MPC · JPL
243705	2000 CE_{81}	—	February 4, 2000	Socorro	LINEAR	TIR	4.5 km	MPC · JPL
243706	2000 CM_{98}	—	February 8, 2000	Kitt Peak	Spacewatch	HOF	2.8 km	MPC · JPL
243707	2000 CV_{99}	—	February 8, 2000	Kitt Peak	Spacewatch	HOF	2.7 km	MPC · JPL
243708	2000 DQ_{45}	—	February 29, 2000	Socorro	LINEAR	·	990 m	MPC · JPL
243709	2000 ET_{1}	—	March 3, 2000	Socorro	LINEAR	·	1.1 km	MPC · JPL
243710	2000 ED_{96}	—	March 11, 2000	Socorro	LINEAR	·	6.7 km	MPC · JPL
243711	2000 EP_{141}	—	March 2, 2000	Catalina	CSS	·	2.3 km	MPC · JPL
243712	2000 FR_{6}	—	March 27, 2000	Kitt Peak	Spacewatch	·	1.3 km	MPC · JPL
243713	2000 FF_{7}	—	March 29, 2000	Kitt Peak	Spacewatch	·	760 m	MPC · JPL
243714	2000 FA_{65}	—	March 25, 2000	Kitt Peak	Spacewatch	·	2.4 km	MPC · JPL
243715	2000 GN_{37}	—	April 5, 2000	Socorro	LINEAR	THM	4.3 km	MPC · JPL
243716	2000 GE_{117}	—	April 2, 2000	Kitt Peak	Spacewatch	·	3.1 km	MPC · JPL
243717	2000 GN_{146}	—	April 7, 2000	Kitt Peak	Spacewatch	·	630 m	MPC · JPL
243718	2000 GA_{161}	—	April 7, 2000	Anderson Mesa	LONEOS	·	4.3 km	MPC · JPL
243719	2000 GU_{180}	—	April 6, 2000	Socorro	LINEAR	·	2.1 km	MPC · JPL
243720	2000 HZ_{5}	—	April 24, 2000	Kitt Peak	Spacewatch	·	3.9 km	MPC · JPL
243721	2000 HL_{68}	—	April 28, 2000	Kitt Peak	Spacewatch	·	680 m	MPC · JPL
243722	2000 HX_{84}	—	April 30, 2000	Haleakala	NEAT	·	3.6 km	MPC · JPL
243723	2000 HG_{101}	—	April 26, 2000	Kitt Peak	Spacewatch	·	970 m	MPC · JPL
243724	2000 JG_{10}	—	May 4, 2000	Socorro	LINEAR	H	740 m	MPC · JPL
243725	2000 JK_{16}	—	May 5, 2000	Socorro	LINEAR	·	1.2 km	MPC · JPL
243726	2000 JK_{18}	—	May 3, 2000	Socorro	LINEAR	·	1.4 km	MPC · JPL
243727	2000 JV_{18}	—	May 3, 2000	Socorro	LINEAR	TIN	3.2 km	MPC · JPL
243728	2000 JP_{63}	—	May 9, 2000	Socorro	LINEAR	·	6.3 km	MPC · JPL
243729	2000 KN_{9}	—	May 28, 2000	Socorro	LINEAR	·	1.7 km	MPC · JPL
243730	2000 KB_{10}	—	May 28, 2000	Socorro	LINEAR	·	950 m	MPC · JPL
243731	2000 KH_{10}	—	May 28, 2000	Socorro	LINEAR	·	3.5 km	MPC · JPL
243732	2000 KV_{13}	—	May 28, 2000	Socorro	LINEAR	·	1.0 km	MPC · JPL
243733	2000 LZ_{1}	—	June 4, 2000	Reedy Creek	J. Broughton	(32418)	2.4 km	MPC · JPL
243734	2000 NG_{19}	—	July 5, 2000	Anderson Mesa	LONEOS	PHO	1.4 km	MPC · JPL
243735	2000 OT_{1}	—	July 23, 2000	Eskridge	Farpoint	·	1.4 km	MPC · JPL
243736	2000 OM_{7}	—	July 30, 2000	Socorro	LINEAR	PHO	1.9 km	MPC · JPL
243737	2000 OU_{7}	—	July 30, 2000	Socorro	LINEAR	·	7.5 km	MPC · JPL
243738	2000 PP_{6}	—	August 3, 2000	Socorro	LINEAR	H	650 m	MPC · JPL
243739	2000 PO_{18}	—	August 1, 2000	Socorro	LINEAR	NYS	2.5 km	MPC · JPL
243740	2000 QM_{21}	—	August 24, 2000	Socorro	LINEAR	·	3.8 km	MPC · JPL
243741	2000 QS_{21}	—	August 24, 2000	Socorro	LINEAR	·	4.8 km	MPC · JPL
243742	2000 QK_{34}	—	August 26, 2000	Socorro	LINEAR	H	920 m	MPC · JPL
243743	2000 QL_{62}	—	August 28, 2000	Socorro	LINEAR	·	3.2 km	MPC · JPL
243744	2000 QT_{64}	—	August 28, 2000	Socorro	LINEAR	·	1.4 km	MPC · JPL
243745	2000 QM_{86}	—	August 25, 2000	Socorro	LINEAR	·	1.2 km	MPC · JPL
243746	2000 QU_{88}	—	August 25, 2000	Socorro	LINEAR	·	2.1 km	MPC · JPL
243747	2000 QR_{98}	—	August 28, 2000	Socorro	LINEAR	·	2.5 km	MPC · JPL
243748	2000 QJ_{99}	—	August 28, 2000	Socorro	LINEAR	·	5.7 km	MPC · JPL
243749	2000 QR_{107}	—	August 29, 2000	Socorro	LINEAR	·	1.6 km	MPC · JPL
243750	2000 QS_{121}	—	August 25, 2000	Socorro	LINEAR	·	1.4 km	MPC · JPL
243751	2000 QZ_{129}	—	August 31, 2000	Socorro	LINEAR	H	790 m	MPC · JPL
243752	2000 QN_{139}	—	August 31, 2000	Socorro	LINEAR	·	4.0 km	MPC · JPL
243753	2000 QS_{157}	—	August 31, 2000	Socorro	LINEAR	·	4.5 km	MPC · JPL
243754	2000 QY_{159}	—	August 31, 2000	Socorro	LINEAR	·	1.6 km	MPC · JPL
243755	2000 QV_{162}	—	August 31, 2000	Socorro	LINEAR	·	6.2 km	MPC · JPL
243756	2000 QP_{196}	—	August 29, 2000	Socorro	LINEAR	·	2.7 km	MPC · JPL
243757	2000 QZ_{198}	—	August 29, 2000	Socorro	LINEAR	THB	6.0 km	MPC · JPL
243758	2000 QM_{200}	—	August 29, 2000	Socorro	LINEAR	·	1.5 km	MPC · JPL
243759	2000 QK_{205}	—	August 31, 2000	Socorro	LINEAR	NYS	1.3 km	MPC · JPL
243760	2000 QD_{209}	—	August 31, 2000	Socorro	LINEAR	·	1.9 km	MPC · JPL
243761	2000 QP_{220}	—	August 21, 2000	Anderson Mesa	LONEOS	·	1.4 km	MPC · JPL
243762	2000 QU_{226}	—	August 31, 2000	Socorro	LINEAR	·	2.7 km	MPC · JPL
243763	2000 RF_{18}	—	September 1, 2000	Socorro	LINEAR	·	5.8 km	MPC · JPL
243764	2000 RZ_{19}	—	September 1, 2000	Socorro	LINEAR	V	840 m	MPC · JPL
243765	2000 RJ_{21}	—	September 1, 2000	Socorro	LINEAR	·	1.4 km	MPC · JPL
243766	2000 RS_{26}	—	September 1, 2000	Socorro	LINEAR	·	1.3 km	MPC · JPL
243767	2000 RF_{42}	—	September 3, 2000	Socorro	LINEAR	·	3.6 km	MPC · JPL
243768	2000 RS_{63}	—	September 3, 2000	Socorro	LINEAR	·	1.1 km	MPC · JPL
243769	2000 RP_{78}	—	September 8, 2000	Kitt Peak	Spacewatch	V	700 m	MPC · JPL
243770	2000 RU_{79}	—	September 1, 2000	Socorro	LINEAR	·	4.6 km	MPC · JPL
243771	2000 RP_{81}	—	September 1, 2000	Socorro	LINEAR	V	830 m	MPC · JPL
243772	2000 RS_{89}	—	September 3, 2000	Socorro	LINEAR	·	1.3 km	MPC · JPL
243773	2000 RJ_{91}	—	September 3, 2000	Socorro	LINEAR	·	1.0 km	MPC · JPL
243774	2000 RY_{97}	—	September 5, 2000	Anderson Mesa	LONEOS	·	4.4 km	MPC · JPL
243775	2000 RA_{101}	—	September 5, 2000	Anderson Mesa	LONEOS	·	1.1 km	MPC · JPL
243776	2000 SH	—	September 18, 2000	Ondřejov	L. Kotková	·	2.2 km	MPC · JPL
243777	2000 SJ	—	September 19, 2000	Emerald Lane	L. Ball	·	4.4 km	MPC · JPL
243778	2000 SA_{5}	—	September 20, 2000	Socorro	LINEAR	H	910 m	MPC · JPL
243779	2000 SQ_{5}	—	September 22, 2000	Socorro	LINEAR	·	4.7 km	MPC · JPL
243780	2000 SC_{20}	—	September 23, 2000	Socorro	LINEAR	·	2.1 km	MPC · JPL
243781	2000 SC_{22}	—	September 25, 2000	Socorro	LINEAR	·	2.8 km	MPC · JPL
243782	2000 SR_{22}	—	September 20, 2000	Haleakala	NEAT	·	1.3 km	MPC · JPL
243783	2000 SO_{54}	—	September 24, 2000	Socorro	LINEAR	·	890 m	MPC · JPL
243784	2000 SM_{55}	—	September 24, 2000	Socorro	LINEAR	·	1.8 km	MPC · JPL
243785	2000 SF_{56}	—	September 24, 2000	Socorro	LINEAR	·	2.0 km	MPC · JPL
243786	2000 SK_{58}	—	September 24, 2000	Socorro	LINEAR	EUN	1.3 km	MPC · JPL
243787	2000 SF_{59}	—	September 24, 2000	Socorro	LINEAR	ERI	2.9 km	MPC · JPL
243788	2000 ST_{60}	—	September 24, 2000	Socorro	LINEAR	·	1.2 km	MPC · JPL
243789	2000 SD_{67}	—	September 24, 2000	Socorro	LINEAR	·	2.6 km	MPC · JPL
243790	2000 SQ_{70}	—	September 24, 2000	Socorro	LINEAR	MAS	1.1 km	MPC · JPL
243791	2000 SD_{80}	—	September 24, 2000	Socorro	LINEAR	·	1.4 km	MPC · JPL
243792	2000 SM_{81}	—	September 24, 2000	Socorro	LINEAR	·	1.6 km	MPC · JPL
243793	2000 SP_{81}	—	September 24, 2000	Socorro	LINEAR	·	2.1 km	MPC · JPL
243794	2000 SO_{95}	—	September 23, 2000	Socorro	LINEAR	·	1.4 km	MPC · JPL
243795	2000 SP_{101}	—	September 24, 2000	Socorro	LINEAR	·	1.9 km	MPC · JPL
243796	2000 SW_{109}	—	September 24, 2000	Socorro	LINEAR	·	1.6 km	MPC · JPL
243797	2000 SW_{112}	—	September 24, 2000	Socorro	LINEAR	MAS	930 m	MPC · JPL
243798	2000 SM_{132}	—	September 22, 2000	Socorro	LINEAR	·	3.6 km	MPC · JPL
243799	2000 SR_{132}	—	September 23, 2000	Socorro	LINEAR	T_{j} (2.99) · EUP	5.8 km	MPC · JPL
243800	2000 SV_{134}	—	September 23, 2000	Socorro	LINEAR	·	4.1 km	MPC · JPL

== 243801–243900 ==
back to top

Designation			Discovery			Properties		Ref
Permanent	Provisional	Named after	Date	Site	Discoverer(s)	Category	Diam.	Ref
243801	2000 SS_{135}	—	September 23, 2000	Socorro	LINEAR	·	5.1 km	MPC · JPL
243802	2000 SU_{137}	—	September 23, 2000	Socorro	LINEAR	·	2.1 km	MPC · JPL
243803	2000 SC_{157}	—	September 26, 2000	Socorro	LINEAR	NYS	1.2 km	MPC · JPL
243804	2000 SR_{158}	—	September 23, 2000	Kitt Peak	Spacewatch	·	3.6 km	MPC · JPL
243805	2000 SS_{159}	—	September 28, 2000	Kitt Peak	Spacewatch	·	960 m	MPC · JPL
243806	2000 SH_{162}	—	September 21, 2000	Haleakala	NEAT	·	3.0 km	MPC · JPL
243807	2000 SR_{176}	—	September 28, 2000	Socorro	LINEAR	·	2.1 km	MPC · JPL
243808	2000 SB_{196}	—	September 24, 2000	Socorro	LINEAR	·	1.1 km	MPC · JPL
243809	2000 SF_{223}	—	September 27, 2000	Socorro	LINEAR	·	2.0 km	MPC · JPL
243810	2000 SS_{233}	—	September 21, 2000	Socorro	LINEAR	·	1.4 km	MPC · JPL
243811	2000 SR_{237}	—	September 25, 2000	Socorro	LINEAR	T_{j} (2.99)	5.8 km	MPC · JPL
243812	2000 SY_{241}	—	September 24, 2000	Socorro	LINEAR	EUP	6.2 km	MPC · JPL
243813	2000 SP_{277}	—	September 30, 2000	Socorro	LINEAR	V	1.2 km	MPC · JPL
243814	2000 SL_{292}	—	September 27, 2000	Socorro	LINEAR	·	2.6 km	MPC · JPL
243815	2000 SB_{297}	—	September 28, 2000	Socorro	LINEAR	·	3.4 km	MPC · JPL
243816	2000 SY_{297}	—	September 28, 2000	Socorro	LINEAR	·	1.3 km	MPC · JPL
243817	2000 SU_{306}	—	September 30, 2000	Socorro	LINEAR	·	2.1 km	MPC · JPL
243818	2000 SU_{315}	—	September 28, 2000	Socorro	LINEAR	·	2.4 km	MPC · JPL
243819	2000 SO_{335}	—	September 26, 2000	Kitt Peak	Spacewatch	·	2.5 km	MPC · JPL
243820	2000 SJ_{343}	—	September 23, 2000	Socorro	LINEAR	V	1.1 km	MPC · JPL
243821	2000 SB_{344}	—	September 22, 2000	Kitt Peak	Spacewatch	·	6.1 km	MPC · JPL
243822	2000 ST_{357}	—	September 28, 2000	Anderson Mesa	LONEOS	·	1.7 km	MPC · JPL
243823	2000 SC_{372}	—	September 25, 2000	Socorro	LINEAR	·	930 m	MPC · JPL
243824	2000 TS_{10}	—	October 1, 2000	Socorro	LINEAR	·	5.0 km	MPC · JPL
243825	2000 TX_{10}	—	October 1, 2000	Socorro	LINEAR	·	890 m	MPC · JPL
243826	2000 TX_{20}	—	October 1, 2000	Socorro	LINEAR	·	2.9 km	MPC · JPL
243827	2000 TD_{25}	—	October 2, 2000	Socorro	LINEAR	·	2.0 km	MPC · JPL
243828	2000 TH_{25}	—	October 2, 2000	Socorro	LINEAR	EOS	3.0 km	MPC · JPL
243829	2000 TO_{32}	—	October 6, 2000	Kitt Peak	Spacewatch	·	1.1 km	MPC · JPL
243830	2000 TV_{36}	—	October 6, 2000	Anderson Mesa	LONEOS	·	1.9 km	MPC · JPL
243831	2000 TG_{40}	—	October 1, 2000	Socorro	LINEAR	·	1.4 km	MPC · JPL
243832	2000 TM_{60}	—	October 2, 2000	Anderson Mesa	LONEOS	PHO	1.4 km	MPC · JPL
243833	2000 UG_{30}	—	October 31, 2000	Socorro	LINEAR	H	650 m	MPC · JPL
243834	2000 UM_{51}	—	October 24, 2000	Socorro	LINEAR	·	1.8 km	MPC · JPL
243835	2000 UH_{68}	—	October 25, 2000	Socorro	LINEAR	·	3.6 km	MPC · JPL
243836	2000 UU_{71}	—	October 25, 2000	Socorro	LINEAR	·	4.7 km	MPC · JPL
243837	2000 UF_{74}	—	October 29, 2000	Socorro	LINEAR	·	1.7 km	MPC · JPL
243838	2000 UQ_{80}	—	October 24, 2000	Socorro	LINEAR	V	920 m	MPC · JPL
243839	2000 UZ_{81}	—	October 25, 2000	Socorro	LINEAR	·	5.2 km	MPC · JPL
243840	2000 UP_{107}	—	October 30, 2000	Socorro	LINEAR	·	1.6 km	MPC · JPL
243841	2000 VV_{23}	—	November 1, 2000	Socorro	LINEAR	·	2.2 km	MPC · JPL
243842	2000 VZ_{30}	—	November 1, 2000	Socorro	LINEAR	·	6.0 km	MPC · JPL
243843	2000 VT_{35}	—	November 1, 2000	Socorro	LINEAR	PHO	1.7 km	MPC · JPL
243844	2000 VK_{40}	—	November 1, 2000	Socorro	LINEAR	NEM	2.7 km	MPC · JPL
243845	2000 VG_{50}	—	November 2, 2000	Socorro	LINEAR	·	2.2 km	MPC · JPL
243846	2000 VT_{61}	—	November 9, 2000	Socorro	LINEAR	PHO	1.9 km	MPC · JPL
243847	2000 VA_{62}	—	November 9, 2000	Socorro	LINEAR	PHO	2.0 km	MPC · JPL
243848	2000 WO	—	November 16, 2000	Socorro	LINEAR	·	4.1 km	MPC · JPL
243849	2000 WK_{8}	—	November 20, 2000	Socorro	LINEAR	·	4.3 km	MPC · JPL
243850	2000 WR_{15}	—	November 21, 2000	Socorro	LINEAR	·	1.8 km	MPC · JPL
243851	2000 WO_{22}	—	November 20, 2000	Socorro	LINEAR	·	1.4 km	MPC · JPL
243852	2000 WM_{24}	—	November 20, 2000	Socorro	LINEAR	V	1.3 km	MPC · JPL
243853	2000 WQ_{64}	—	November 27, 2000	Kitt Peak	Spacewatch	·	1.9 km	MPC · JPL
243854	2000 WW_{69}	—	November 19, 2000	Socorro	LINEAR	·	3.3 km	MPC · JPL
243855	2000 WA_{73}	—	November 20, 2000	Socorro	LINEAR	·	6.4 km	MPC · JPL
243856	2000 WC_{86}	—	November 20, 2000	Socorro	LINEAR	·	5.5 km	MPC · JPL
243857	2000 WR_{102}	—	November 26, 2000	Socorro	LINEAR	·	4.8 km	MPC · JPL
243858	2000 WR_{104}	—	November 23, 2000	Kitt Peak	Spacewatch	MAR	1.7 km	MPC · JPL
243859	2000 WS_{129}	—	November 19, 2000	Kitt Peak	Spacewatch	·	3.8 km	MPC · JPL
243860	2000 WA_{131}	—	November 20, 2000	Anderson Mesa	LONEOS	·	2.9 km	MPC · JPL
243861	2000 WJ_{131}	—	November 20, 2000	Anderson Mesa	LONEOS	·	1.4 km	MPC · JPL
243862	2000 WZ_{143}	—	November 21, 2000	Socorro	LINEAR	H	760 m	MPC · JPL
243863	2000 WJ_{154}	—	November 30, 2000	Socorro	LINEAR	·	6.0 km	MPC · JPL
243864	2000 WJ_{163}	—	November 21, 2000	Socorro	LINEAR	MAS	900 m	MPC · JPL
243865	2000 WX_{172}	—	November 25, 2000	Anderson Mesa	LONEOS	·	2.5 km	MPC · JPL
243866	2000 WB_{184}	—	November 30, 2000	Anderson Mesa	LONEOS	EOS	3.7 km	MPC · JPL
243867	2000 WF_{189}	—	November 18, 2000	Anderson Mesa	LONEOS	·	4.5 km	MPC · JPL
243868	2000 WP_{189}	—	November 18, 2000	Anderson Mesa	LONEOS	·	1.7 km	MPC · JPL
243869	2000 XJ_{1}	—	December 3, 2000	Kitt Peak	Spacewatch	·	3.2 km	MPC · JPL
243870	2000 XQ_{1}	—	December 3, 2000	Kitt Peak	Spacewatch	·	2.8 km	MPC · JPL
243871	2000 XZ_{2}	—	December 1, 2000	Socorro	LINEAR	·	6.6 km	MPC · JPL
243872	2000 XW_{17}	—	December 4, 2000	Socorro	LINEAR	·	2.0 km	MPC · JPL
243873	2000 XM_{29}	—	December 4, 2000	Socorro	LINEAR	·	2.2 km	MPC · JPL
243874	2000 XY_{30}	—	December 4, 2000	Socorro	LINEAR	·	3.2 km	MPC · JPL
243875	2000 XB_{40}	—	December 5, 2000	Socorro	LINEAR	·	6.6 km	MPC · JPL
243876	2000 XU_{40}	—	December 5, 2000	Socorro	LINEAR	EUN	2.6 km	MPC · JPL
243877	2000 YR_{1}	—	December 17, 2000	Socorro	LINEAR	·	2.4 km	MPC · JPL
243878	2000 YY_{6}	—	December 20, 2000	Socorro	LINEAR	·	2.1 km	MPC · JPL
243879	2000 YU_{7}	—	December 21, 2000	Socorro	LINEAR	·	1.4 km	MPC · JPL
243880	2000 YH_{23}	—	December 28, 2000	Kitt Peak	Spacewatch	·	3.1 km	MPC · JPL
243881	2000 YP_{33}	—	December 31, 2000	Haleakala	NEAT	H	1.9 km	MPC · JPL
243882	2000 YT_{38}	—	December 30, 2000	Socorro	LINEAR	·	3.2 km	MPC · JPL
243883	2000 YO_{46}	—	December 30, 2000	Socorro	LINEAR	·	1.9 km	MPC · JPL
243884	2000 YB_{56}	—	December 30, 2000	Socorro	LINEAR	·	1.9 km	MPC · JPL
243885	2000 YQ_{94}	—	December 30, 2000	Socorro	LINEAR	·	2.1 km	MPC · JPL
243886	2000 YK_{99}	—	December 30, 2000	Socorro	LINEAR	THB	7.2 km	MPC · JPL
243887	2000 YA_{101}	—	December 31, 2000	Haleakala	NEAT	·	1.9 km	MPC · JPL
243888	2000 YP_{119}	—	December 17, 2000	Kitt Peak	Spacewatch	NYS	1.8 km	MPC · JPL
243889	2001 AO_{6}	—	January 2, 2001	Socorro	LINEAR	·	2.2 km	MPC · JPL
243890	2001 AD_{36}	—	January 5, 2001	Socorro	LINEAR	·	2.2 km	MPC · JPL
243891	2001 AV_{45}	—	January 15, 2001	Socorro	LINEAR	·	2.8 km	MPC · JPL
243892	2001 AM_{50}	—	January 14, 2001	Kitt Peak	Spacewatch	·	2.0 km	MPC · JPL
243893	2001 BN_{5}	—	January 19, 2001	Socorro	LINEAR	BAR	1.7 km	MPC · JPL
243894	2001 BW_{23}	—	January 20, 2001	Socorro	LINEAR	·	1.3 km	MPC · JPL
243895	2001 BA_{27}	—	January 20, 2001	Socorro	LINEAR	·	4.2 km	MPC · JPL
243896	2001 BN_{48}	—	January 21, 2001	Socorro	LINEAR	·	3.9 km	MPC · JPL
243897	2001 BH_{52}	—	January 17, 2001	Kitt Peak	Spacewatch	·	5.2 km	MPC · JPL
243898	2001 BD_{56}	—	January 19, 2001	Socorro	LINEAR	ERI	2.8 km	MPC · JPL
243899	2001 DA_{12}	—	February 17, 2001	Socorro	LINEAR	·	5.2 km	MPC · JPL
243900	2001 DC_{61}	—	February 19, 2001	Socorro	LINEAR	·	2.2 km	MPC · JPL

== 243901–244000 ==
back to top

Designation			Discovery			Properties		Ref
Permanent	Provisional	Named after	Date	Site	Discoverer(s)	Category	Diam.	Ref
243901	2001 EJ_{2}	—	March 1, 2001	Socorro	LINEAR	·	2.7 km	MPC · JPL
243902	2001 EP_{5}	—	March 2, 2001	Anderson Mesa	LONEOS	·	6.4 km	MPC · JPL
243903	2001 EW_{17}	—	March 15, 2001	Socorro	LINEAR	H	1.1 km	MPC · JPL
243904	2001 FR_{40}	—	March 18, 2001	Socorro	LINEAR	·	2.3 km	MPC · JPL
243905	2001 FB_{82}	—	March 23, 2001	Socorro	LINEAR	ADE	4.3 km	MPC · JPL
243906	2001 FG_{88}	—	March 24, 2001	Kitt Peak	Spacewatch	·	3.1 km	MPC · JPL
243907	2001 FG_{93}	—	March 16, 2001	Socorro	LINEAR	·	2.0 km	MPC · JPL
243908	2001 FE_{95}	—	March 16, 2001	Socorro	LINEAR	·	2.5 km	MPC · JPL
243909	2001 FY_{103}	—	March 18, 2001	Socorro	LINEAR	JUN	1.0 km	MPC · JPL
243910	2001 FJ_{122}	—	March 23, 2001	Anderson Mesa	LONEOS	·	2.2 km	MPC · JPL
243911	2001 FJ_{189}	—	March 16, 2001	Socorro	LINEAR	·	2.6 km	MPC · JPL
243912	2001 HZ_{1}	—	April 17, 2001	Socorro	LINEAR	·	3.0 km	MPC · JPL
243913	2001 HR_{13}	—	April 21, 2001	Socorro	LINEAR	·	3.4 km	MPC · JPL
243914	2001 HY_{22}	—	April 26, 2001	Desert Beaver	W. K. Y. Yeung	·	7.7 km	MPC · JPL
243915	2001 HE_{57}	—	April 25, 2001	Anderson Mesa	LONEOS	T_{j} (2.98)	8.0 km	MPC · JPL
243916	2001 HM_{68}	—	April 16, 2001	Kitt Peak	Spacewatch	·	3.3 km	MPC · JPL
243917	2001 KN_{32}	—	May 24, 2001	Kitt Peak	Spacewatch	·	2.2 km	MPC · JPL
243918	2001 KX_{47}	—	May 24, 2001	Socorro	LINEAR	·	3.6 km	MPC · JPL
243919	2001 KB_{57}	—	May 23, 2001	Socorro	LINEAR	·	3.4 km	MPC · JPL
243920	2001 MM_{21}	—	June 27, 2001	Palomar	NEAT	·	3.5 km	MPC · JPL
243921	2001 MU_{24}	—	June 16, 2001	Anderson Mesa	LONEOS	·	2.9 km	MPC · JPL
243922	2001 MS_{25}	—	June 19, 2001	Palomar	NEAT	·	3.4 km	MPC · JPL
243923	2001 NQ_{1}	—	July 10, 2001	Palomar	NEAT	·	7.3 km	MPC · JPL
243924	2001 NO_{22}	—	July 1, 2001	Palomar	NEAT	·	1.5 km	MPC · JPL
243925	2001 OZ_{5}	—	July 17, 2001	Anderson Mesa	LONEOS	·	4.2 km	MPC · JPL
243926	2001 OX_{22}	—	July 18, 2001	Palomar	NEAT	EUP	9.1 km	MPC · JPL
243927	2001 OR_{33}	—	July 19, 2001	Palomar	NEAT	·	1.1 km	MPC · JPL
243928	2001 OT_{53}	—	July 21, 2001	Palomar	NEAT	·	1.6 km	MPC · JPL
243929	2001 OU_{61}	—	July 21, 2001	Haleakala	NEAT	·	3.2 km	MPC · JPL
243930	2001 OO_{66}	—	July 23, 2001	Palomar	NEAT	EUP	8.0 km	MPC · JPL
243931	2001 OC_{86}	—	July 22, 2001	Socorro	LINEAR	·	1.2 km	MPC · JPL
243932	2001 OL_{88}	—	July 21, 2001	Haleakala	NEAT	·	3.2 km	MPC · JPL
243933	2001 OX_{91}	—	July 31, 2001	Palomar	NEAT	·	1.9 km	MPC · JPL
243934	2001 OQ_{106}	—	July 29, 2001	Socorro	LINEAR	·	2.4 km	MPC · JPL
243935	2001 PC_{7}	—	August 10, 2001	Haleakala	NEAT	·	1.9 km	MPC · JPL
243936	2001 PA_{15}	—	August 13, 2001	Kvistaberg	Uppsala-DLR Asteroid Survey	DOR	3.6 km	MPC · JPL
243937	2001 PZ_{21}	—	August 10, 2001	Haleakala	NEAT	·	1.7 km	MPC · JPL
243938	2001 PJ_{27}	—	August 11, 2001	Haleakala	NEAT	·	1.2 km	MPC · JPL
243939	2001 PX_{32}	—	August 10, 2001	Palomar	NEAT	PHO	2.5 km	MPC · JPL
243940	2001 PT_{33}	—	August 10, 2001	Palomar	NEAT	DOR	3.5 km	MPC · JPL
243941	2001 PT_{35}	—	August 11, 2001	Palomar	NEAT	TIN	2.2 km	MPC · JPL
243942	2001 PM_{49}	—	August 13, 2001	Palomar	NEAT	·	2.7 km	MPC · JPL
243943	2001 PO_{49}	—	August 14, 2001	Palomar	NEAT	·	3.0 km	MPC · JPL
243944	2001 QM_{4}	—	August 16, 2001	Socorro	LINEAR	·	2.2 km	MPC · JPL
243945	2001 QU_{39}	—	August 16, 2001	Socorro	LINEAR	·	3.2 km	MPC · JPL
243946	2001 QM_{79}	—	August 16, 2001	Socorro	LINEAR	TIN	4.1 km	MPC · JPL
243947	2001 QX_{89}	—	August 16, 2001	Palomar	NEAT	·	5.1 km	MPC · JPL
243948	2001 QD_{117}	—	August 17, 2001	Socorro	LINEAR	·	2.8 km	MPC · JPL
243949	2001 QG_{126}	—	August 20, 2001	Socorro	LINEAR	ADE	5.2 km	MPC · JPL
243950	2001 QY_{132}	—	August 20, 2001	Socorro	LINEAR	·	1.4 km	MPC · JPL
243951	2001 QX_{163}	—	August 31, 2001	Desert Eagle	W. K. Y. Yeung	·	3.5 km	MPC · JPL
243952	2001 QP_{166}	—	August 24, 2001	Haleakala	NEAT	ADE	3.9 km	MPC · JPL
243953	2001 QE_{173}	—	August 25, 2001	Socorro	LINEAR	·	3.8 km	MPC · JPL
243954	2001 QJ_{173}	—	August 25, 2001	Socorro	LINEAR	EOS	2.6 km	MPC · JPL
243955	2001 QW_{179}	—	August 25, 2001	Palomar	NEAT	·	3.4 km	MPC · JPL
243956	2001 QR_{194}	—	August 22, 2001	Socorro	LINEAR	·	3.3 km	MPC · JPL
243957	2001 QZ_{206}	—	August 23, 2001	Anderson Mesa	LONEOS	·	2.7 km	MPC · JPL
243958	2001 QX_{208}	—	August 23, 2001	Anderson Mesa	LONEOS	·	770 m	MPC · JPL
243959	2001 QM_{212}	—	August 23, 2001	Anderson Mesa	LONEOS	·	3.0 km	MPC · JPL
243960	2001 QQ_{227}	—	August 24, 2001	Anderson Mesa	LONEOS	·	5.4 km	MPC · JPL
243961	2001 QL_{229}	—	August 24, 2001	Anderson Mesa	LONEOS	DOR	2.9 km	MPC · JPL
243962	2001 QD_{246}	—	August 24, 2001	Socorro	LINEAR	·	1.8 km	MPC · JPL
243963	2001 QM_{246}	—	August 24, 2001	Socorro	LINEAR	·	1.7 km	MPC · JPL
243964	2001 QD_{254}	—	August 25, 2001	Anderson Mesa	LONEOS	·	3.7 km	MPC · JPL
243965	2001 QT_{264}	—	August 26, 2001	Anderson Mesa	LONEOS	·	6.4 km	MPC · JPL
243966	2001 QX_{280}	—	August 19, 2001	Socorro	LINEAR	·	1.4 km	MPC · JPL
243967	2001 QD_{286}	—	August 17, 2001	Palomar	NEAT	·	3.0 km	MPC · JPL
243968	2001 QM_{294}	—	August 24, 2001	Anderson Mesa	LONEOS	·	2.8 km	MPC · JPL
243969	2001 QX_{294}	—	August 24, 2001	Socorro	LINEAR	·	1.1 km	MPC · JPL
243970	2001 QJ_{329}	—	August 22, 2001	Kitt Peak	Spacewatch	·	1.2 km	MPC · JPL
243971	2001 QL_{330}	—	August 25, 2001	Socorro	LINEAR	EOS	5.2 km	MPC · JPL
243972	2001 QS_{333}	—	August 27, 2001	Palomar	NEAT	·	4.4 km	MPC · JPL
243973	2001 RP	—	September 7, 2001	Socorro	LINEAR	EUP	8.1 km	MPC · JPL
243974	2001 RM_{10}	—	September 10, 2001	Socorro	LINEAR	·	3.6 km	MPC · JPL
243975	2001 RN_{20}	—	September 7, 2001	Socorro	LINEAR	·	880 m	MPC · JPL
243976	2001 RD_{26}	—	September 7, 2001	Socorro	LINEAR	EOS	3.0 km	MPC · JPL
243977	2001 RB_{32}	—	September 8, 2001	Socorro	LINEAR	·	980 m	MPC · JPL
243978	2001 RH_{40}	—	September 10, 2001	Socorro	LINEAR	EOS	2.3 km	MPC · JPL
243979	2001 RC_{43}	—	September 9, 2001	Palomar	NEAT	·	2.9 km	MPC · JPL
243980	2001 RF_{49}	—	September 11, 2001	Socorro	LINEAR	T_{j} (2.98) · EUP	6.8 km	MPC · JPL
243981	2001 RC_{50}	—	September 10, 2001	Socorro	LINEAR	·	1.1 km	MPC · JPL
243982	2001 RP_{52}	—	September 12, 2001	Socorro	LINEAR	·	3.2 km	MPC · JPL
243983	2001 RJ_{53}	—	September 12, 2001	Socorro	LINEAR	DOR	3.1 km	MPC · JPL
243984	2001 RS_{57}	—	September 12, 2001	Socorro	LINEAR	·	4.1 km	MPC · JPL
243985	2001 RA_{61}	—	September 12, 2001	Socorro	LINEAR	TEL	1.9 km	MPC · JPL
243986	2001 RW_{62}	—	September 12, 2001	Socorro	LINEAR	NYS	1.4 km	MPC · JPL
243987	2001 RE_{64}	—	September 10, 2001	Socorro	LINEAR	·	3.4 km	MPC · JPL
243988	2001 RF_{76}	—	September 10, 2001	Socorro	LINEAR	·	1.2 km	MPC · JPL
243989	2001 RP_{105}	—	September 12, 2001	Socorro	LINEAR	·	2.9 km	MPC · JPL
243990	2001 RH_{119}	—	September 12, 2001	Socorro	LINEAR	NAE	5.0 km	MPC · JPL
243991	2001 RD_{129}	—	September 12, 2001	Socorro	LINEAR	·	2.5 km	MPC · JPL
243992	2001 RB_{132}	—	September 12, 2001	Socorro	LINEAR	·	860 m	MPC · JPL
243993	2001 RN_{132}	—	September 12, 2001	Socorro	LINEAR	·	3.2 km	MPC · JPL
243994	2001 RB_{136}	—	September 12, 2001	Socorro	LINEAR	·	1.4 km	MPC · JPL
243995	2001 RL_{142}	—	September 13, 2001	Palomar	NEAT	·	2.8 km	MPC · JPL
243996	2001 RP_{149}	—	September 11, 2001	Anderson Mesa	LONEOS	·	800 m	MPC · JPL
243997	2001 SG_{6}	—	September 18, 2001	Kitt Peak	Spacewatch	·	910 m	MPC · JPL
243998	2001 SR_{11}	—	September 16, 2001	Socorro	LINEAR	EOS	2.5 km	MPC · JPL
243999	2001 SG_{21}	—	September 16, 2001	Socorro	LINEAR	(21344)	1.9 km	MPC · JPL
244000	2001 SF_{24}	—	September 16, 2001	Socorro	LINEAR	·	1.2 km	MPC · JPL

back to top

== See also ==
- Meanings of minor-planet names: 243001–244000
