= List of minor planets: 241001–242000 =

The following is a partial list of minor planets, running from minor-planet number 241001 through 242000, inclusive. The primary data for this and other partial lists is based on JPL's "Small-Body Orbital Elements" and data available from the Minor Planet Center. Critical list information is also provided by the MPC, unless otherwise specified from Lowell Observatory. A detailed description of the table's columns and additional sources are given on the main page including a complete list of every page in this series, and a statistical break-up on the dynamical classification of minor planets.

Also see the summary list of all named bodies in numerical and alphabetical order, and the corresponding naming citations for the number range of this particular list. New namings may only be added to this list after official publication, as the preannouncement of names is condemned by the Working Group for Small Bodies Nomenclature of the International Astronomical Union.

Near-Earth obj.	MBA (inner)	MBA (outer)	Centaur
Mars-crosser	MBA (middle)	Jupiter trojan	Trans-Neptunian obj.
Unclassified

== 241001–241100 ==
Designation			Discovery			Properties		Ref
Permanent	Provisional	Named after	Date	Site	Discoverer(s)	Category	Diam.	Ref
241001	2006 KF_{86}	—	May 23, 2006	Anderson Mesa	LONEOS	·	3.6 km	MPC · JPL
241002	2006 KE_{92}	—	May 25, 2006	Kitt Peak	Spacewatch	·	3.2 km	MPC · JPL
241003	2006 KA_{119}	—	May 30, 2006	Kitt Peak	Spacewatch	·	1.6 km	MPC · JPL
241004	2006 KR_{121}	—	May 28, 2006	Catalina	CSS	·	3.0 km	MPC · JPL
241005	2006 LE_{5}	—	June 4, 2006	Mount Lemmon	Mount Lemmon Survey	(5)	2.0 km	MPC · JPL
241006	2006 LV_{7}	—	June 14, 2006	Siding Spring	SSS	·	4.2 km	MPC · JPL
241007	2006 MP_{2}	—	June 16, 2006	Kitt Peak	Spacewatch	·	2.1 km	MPC · JPL
241008	2006 MQ_{5}	—	June 17, 2006	Kitt Peak	Spacewatch	·	3.2 km	MPC · JPL
241009	2006 MJ_{12}	—	June 16, 2006	Kitt Peak	Spacewatch	EUN	1.6 km	MPC · JPL
241010	2006 MK_{12}	—	June 16, 2006	Palomar	NEAT	·	2.3 km	MPC · JPL
241011	2006 OP_{11}	—	July 20, 2006	Lulin	LUSS	·	3.4 km	MPC · JPL
241012	2006 OQ_{14}	—	July 24, 2006	Bergisch Gladbach	W. Bickel	·	2.5 km	MPC · JPL
241013	2006 PW_{13}	—	August 14, 2006	Siding Spring	SSS	·	3.2 km	MPC · JPL
241014	2006 PS_{34}	—	August 11, 2006	Palomar	NEAT	·	2.3 km	MPC · JPL
241015	2006 PH_{36}	—	August 12, 2006	Palomar	NEAT	·	2.5 km	MPC · JPL
241016	2006 PY_{43}	—	August 14, 2006	Siding Spring	SSS	·	2.5 km	MPC · JPL
241017	2006 QN_{9}	—	August 19, 2006	Palomar	NEAT	·	3.2 km	MPC · JPL
241018	2006 QJ_{13}	—	August 16, 2006	Siding Spring	SSS	AGN	2.0 km	MPC · JPL
241019	2006 QS_{29}	—	August 17, 2006	Palomar	NEAT	·	3.4 km	MPC · JPL
241020	2006 QC_{30}	—	August 19, 2006	Palomar	NEAT	EUP	6.4 km	MPC · JPL
241021	2006 QP_{30}	—	August 21, 2006	Palomar	NEAT	·	5.3 km	MPC · JPL
241022	2006 QL_{31}	—	August 22, 2006	Pla D'Arguines	R. Ferrando	LIX	5.8 km	MPC · JPL
241023	2006 QA_{36}	—	August 19, 2006	Palomar	NEAT	·	3.9 km	MPC · JPL
241024	2006 QW_{46}	—	August 20, 2006	Palomar	NEAT	GEF	1.9 km	MPC · JPL
241025	2006 QF_{47}	—	August 20, 2006	Palomar	NEAT	·	4.1 km	MPC · JPL
241026	2006 QR_{63}	—	August 24, 2006	Palomar	NEAT	EOS	2.7 km	MPC · JPL
241027	2006 QJ_{69}	—	August 21, 2006	Kitt Peak	Spacewatch	·	3.6 km	MPC · JPL
241028	2006 QV_{79}	—	August 24, 2006	Socorro	LINEAR	·	5.2 km	MPC · JPL
241029	2006 QY_{88}	—	August 27, 2006	Kitt Peak	Spacewatch	·	3.7 km	MPC · JPL
241030	2006 QA_{91}	—	August 16, 2006	Palomar	NEAT	·	2.3 km	MPC · JPL
241031	2006 QD_{94}	—	August 16, 2006	Palomar	NEAT	·	1.9 km	MPC · JPL
241032	2006 QE_{99}	—	August 23, 2006	Palomar	NEAT	·	3.7 km	MPC · JPL
241033	2006 QB_{109}	—	August 28, 2006	Kitt Peak	Spacewatch	·	5.0 km	MPC · JPL
241034	2006 QQ_{127}	—	August 17, 2006	Palomar	NEAT	MRX	1.4 km	MPC · JPL
241035	2006 QV_{128}	—	August 17, 2006	Palomar	NEAT	·	4.7 km	MPC · JPL
241036	2006 QV_{132}	—	August 23, 2006	Socorro	LINEAR	·	2.5 km	MPC · JPL
241037	2006 QG_{142}	—	August 18, 2006	Palomar	NEAT	·	2.1 km	MPC · JPL
241038	2006 QO_{155}	—	August 18, 2006	Palomar	NEAT	EUN	1.9 km	MPC · JPL
241039	2006 QB_{159}	—	August 19, 2006	Kitt Peak	Spacewatch	·	4.4 km	MPC · JPL
241040	2006 QA_{183}	—	August 19, 2006	Kitt Peak	Spacewatch	·	2.8 km	MPC · JPL
241041	2006 RP_{5}	—	September 14, 2006	Catalina	CSS	EOS	2.8 km	MPC · JPL
241042	2006 RQ_{16}	—	September 14, 2006	Catalina	CSS	·	3.0 km	MPC · JPL
241043	2006 RQ_{30}	—	September 15, 2006	Socorro	LINEAR	·	4.3 km	MPC · JPL
241044	2006 RW_{36}	—	September 12, 2006	Catalina	CSS	·	3.2 km	MPC · JPL
241045	2006 RX_{40}	—	September 14, 2006	Kitt Peak	Spacewatch	EOS	3.4 km	MPC · JPL
241046	2006 RD_{76}	—	September 15, 2006	Kitt Peak	Spacewatch	THM	3.2 km	MPC · JPL
241047	2006 RJ_{81}	—	September 15, 2006	Kitt Peak	Spacewatch	·	1.5 km	MPC · JPL
241048	2006 RL_{86}	—	September 15, 2006	Kitt Peak	Spacewatch	·	2.3 km	MPC · JPL
241049	2006 RW_{90}	—	September 15, 2006	Kitt Peak	Spacewatch	·	3.9 km	MPC · JPL
241050	2006 RU_{104}	—	September 14, 2006	Kitt Peak	Spacewatch	·	3.6 km	MPC · JPL
241051	2006 SE_{5}	—	September 16, 2006	Palomar	NEAT	·	3.6 km	MPC · JPL
241052	2006 SN_{22}	—	September 17, 2006	Anderson Mesa	LONEOS	·	5.2 km	MPC · JPL
241053	2006 SV_{54}	—	September 18, 2006	Catalina	CSS	·	3.5 km	MPC · JPL
241054	2006 SH_{75}	—	September 19, 2006	Kitt Peak	Spacewatch	HOF	3.7 km	MPC · JPL
241055	2006 SC_{82}	—	September 18, 2006	Kitt Peak	Spacewatch	THM	3.8 km	MPC · JPL
241056	2006 SJ_{108}	—	September 19, 2006	Catalina	CSS	·	3.6 km	MPC · JPL
241057	2006 SO_{116}	—	September 24, 2006	Kitt Peak	Spacewatch	THM	2.7 km	MPC · JPL
241058	2006 SU_{125}	—	September 20, 2006	Palomar	NEAT	·	3.6 km	MPC · JPL
241059	2006 SD_{136}	—	September 20, 2006	Catalina	CSS	·	4.6 km	MPC · JPL
241060	2006 SM_{141}	—	September 25, 2006	Anderson Mesa	LONEOS	·	4.8 km	MPC · JPL
241061	2006 SD_{177}	—	September 25, 2006	Kitt Peak	Spacewatch	·	3.0 km	MPC · JPL
241062	2006 SY_{188}	—	September 26, 2006	Kitt Peak	Spacewatch	·	4.8 km	MPC · JPL
241063	2006 SL_{215}	—	September 27, 2006	Kitt Peak	Spacewatch	HYG	4.7 km	MPC · JPL
241064	2006 SD_{217}	—	September 28, 2006	Kitt Peak	Spacewatch	·	3.2 km	MPC · JPL
241065	2006 SL_{217}	—	September 28, 2006	Kitt Peak	Spacewatch	·	4.9 km	MPC · JPL
241066	2006 SP_{218}	—	September 29, 2006	Mayhill	Lowe, A.	·	4.6 km	MPC · JPL
241067	2006 SG_{312}	—	September 27, 2006	Kitt Peak	Spacewatch	HOF	3.5 km	MPC · JPL
241068	2006 SV_{351}	—	September 30, 2006	Catalina	CSS	·	4.9 km	MPC · JPL
241069	2006 SE_{373}	—	September 16, 2006	Apache Point	A. C. Becker	·	2.5 km	MPC · JPL
241070	2006 SZ_{390}	—	September 17, 2006	Kitt Peak	Spacewatch	·	3.4 km	MPC · JPL
241071	2006 SF_{392}	—	September 25, 2006	Kitt Peak	Spacewatch	·	4.3 km	MPC · JPL
241072	2006 TV_{12}	—	October 10, 2006	Palomar	NEAT	·	5.4 km	MPC · JPL
241073	2006 TB_{39}	—	October 12, 2006	Kitt Peak	Spacewatch	·	2.9 km	MPC · JPL
241074	2006 TG_{45}	—	October 12, 2006	Kitt Peak	Spacewatch	·	2.8 km	MPC · JPL
241075	2006 TT_{55}	—	October 12, 2006	Palomar	NEAT	TIR	4.9 km	MPC · JPL
241076	2006 TG_{62}	—	October 9, 2006	Palomar	NEAT	LUT	7.3 km	MPC · JPL
241077	2006 TJ_{69}	—	October 11, 2006	Palomar	NEAT	·	4.2 km	MPC · JPL
241078	2006 TB_{116}	—	October 2, 2006	Apache Point	A. C. Becker	·	2.5 km	MPC · JPL
241079	2006 UN_{3}	—	October 16, 2006	Catalina	CSS	·	6.2 km	MPC · JPL
241080	2006 UF_{18}	—	October 16, 2006	Catalina	CSS	·	3.2 km	MPC · JPL
241081	2006 UF_{30}	—	October 16, 2006	Kitt Peak	Spacewatch	HOF	2.8 km	MPC · JPL
241082	2006 US_{39}	—	October 16, 2006	Kitt Peak	Spacewatch	·	5.1 km	MPC · JPL
241083	2006 UJ_{55}	—	October 17, 2006	Kitt Peak	Spacewatch	·	4.2 km	MPC · JPL
241084	2006 UZ_{182}	—	October 16, 2006	Catalina	CSS	·	2.9 km	MPC · JPL
241085	2006 UR_{195}	—	October 20, 2006	Mount Lemmon	Mount Lemmon Survey	EOS	2.0 km	MPC · JPL
241086	2006 UV_{222}	—	October 17, 2006	Catalina	CSS	·	4.8 km	MPC · JPL
241087	2006 UL_{239}	—	October 23, 2006	Kitt Peak	Spacewatch	·	2.5 km	MPC · JPL
241088	2006 UO_{254}	—	October 27, 2006	Mount Lemmon	Mount Lemmon Survey	·	4.7 km	MPC · JPL
241089	2006 UE_{265}	—	October 27, 2006	Catalina	CSS	CYB	4.8 km	MPC · JPL
241090 Nemet	2006 UK_{290}	Nemet	October 23, 2006	Mauna Kea	D. D. Balam	·	4.1 km	MPC · JPL
241091	2006 UO_{296}	—	October 19, 2006	Kitt Peak	M. W. Buie	THM	3.1 km	MPC · JPL
241092	2006 VR_{2}	—	November 5, 2006	Palomar	NEAT	DOR	4.5 km	MPC · JPL
241093	2006 VV_{57}	—	November 11, 2006	Kitt Peak	Spacewatch	3:2 · SHU	7.7 km	MPC · JPL
241094	2006 WO_{51}	—	November 16, 2006	Kitt Peak	Spacewatch	·	3.1 km	MPC · JPL
241095	2007 CT_{29}	—	February 6, 2007	Mount Lemmon	Mount Lemmon Survey	·	3.6 km	MPC · JPL
241096	2007 DD_{104}	—	February 25, 2007	Catalina	CSS	H	1.0 km	MPC · JPL
241097	2007 DU_{112}	—	February 23, 2007	Kitt Peak	Spacewatch	centaur	30 km	MPC · JPL
241098	2007 GW	—	April 7, 2007	Catalina	CSS	H	750 m	MPC · JPL
241099	2007 GH_{2}	—	April 6, 2007	Charleston	Astronomical Research Observatory	L5	14 km	MPC · JPL
241100	2007 GL_{29}	—	April 11, 2007	Catalina	CSS	H	850 m	MPC · JPL

== 241101–241200 ==
back to top

Designation			Discovery			Properties		Ref
Permanent	Provisional	Named after	Date	Site	Discoverer(s)	Category	Diam.	Ref
241101	2007 GD_{50}	—	April 15, 2007	Catalina	CSS	·	760 m	MPC · JPL
241102	2007 HO	—	April 17, 2007	Siding Spring	SSS	H	1.2 km	MPC · JPL
241103	2007 HM_{36}	—	April 19, 2007	Kitt Peak	Spacewatch	·	1.5 km	MPC · JPL
241104	2007 JG_{12}	—	May 7, 2007	Kitt Peak	Spacewatch	·	3.6 km	MPC · JPL
241105	2007 JR_{15}	—	May 10, 2007	Mount Lemmon	Mount Lemmon Survey	KON	3.6 km	MPC · JPL
241106	2007 KL_{8}	—	May 20, 2007	Catalina	CSS	·	2.9 km	MPC · JPL
241107	2007 LQ_{14}	—	June 10, 2007	Kitt Peak	Spacewatch	MAR	1.7 km	MPC · JPL
241108	2007 LO_{17}	—	June 10, 2007	Kitt Peak	Spacewatch	·	1.5 km	MPC · JPL
241109	2007 MB_{10}	—	June 21, 2007	Anderson Mesa	LONEOS	·	920 m	MPC · JPL
241110	2007 NR_{1}	—	July 12, 2007	La Sagra	OAM	·	1.2 km	MPC · JPL
241111	2007 NM_{7}	—	July 15, 2007	Siding Spring	SSS	V	920 m	MPC · JPL
241112	2007 OF_{2}	—	July 16, 2007	Socorro	LINEAR	·	1.0 km	MPC · JPL
241113 Zhongda	2007 OU_{4}	Zhongda	July 21, 2007	Lulin	Q. Ye, Lin, H.-C.	V	970 m	MPC · JPL
241114	2007 OZ_{6}	—	July 22, 2007	Lulin	LUSS	·	3.2 km	MPC · JPL
241115	2007 PC_{2}	—	August 7, 2007	Eskridge	G. Hug	·	1.6 km	MPC · JPL
241116	2007 PB_{6}	—	August 8, 2007	Socorro	LINEAR	·	1.8 km	MPC · JPL
241117	2007 PC_{7}	—	August 5, 2007	Socorro	LINEAR	·	1.6 km	MPC · JPL
241118	2007 PY_{14}	—	August 8, 2007	Socorro	LINEAR	·	1.3 km	MPC · JPL
241119	2007 PB_{15}	—	August 8, 2007	Socorro	LINEAR	·	2.4 km	MPC · JPL
241120	2007 PX_{17}	—	August 9, 2007	Socorro	LINEAR	MAS	920 m	MPC · JPL
241121	2007 PC_{20}	—	August 9, 2007	Socorro	LINEAR	·	2.2 km	MPC · JPL
241122	2007 PU_{22}	—	August 11, 2007	Socorro	LINEAR	·	2.3 km	MPC · JPL
241123	2007 PV_{28}	—	August 12, 2007	Socorro	LINEAR	·	1.8 km	MPC · JPL
241124	2007 PO_{29}	—	August 12, 2007	Great Shefford	Birtwhistle, P.	·	3.0 km	MPC · JPL
241125	2007 PL_{30}	—	August 11, 2007	Socorro	LINEAR	·	2.0 km	MPC · JPL
241126	2007 PG_{31}	—	August 5, 2007	Socorro	LINEAR	·	1.1 km	MPC · JPL
241127	2007 PQ_{31}	—	August 8, 2007	Socorro	LINEAR	MAS	930 m	MPC · JPL
241128	2007 PK_{35}	—	August 9, 2007	Socorro	LINEAR	·	1.9 km	MPC · JPL
241129	2007 PL_{35}	—	August 9, 2007	Socorro	LINEAR	slow	5.4 km	MPC · JPL
241130	2007 PG_{39}	—	August 15, 2007	La Sagra	OAM	NYS	1.5 km	MPC · JPL
241131	2007 PG_{40}	—	August 12, 2007	Socorro	LINEAR	·	1.1 km	MPC · JPL
241132	2007 PN_{43}	—	August 11, 2007	Socorro	LINEAR	·	1.9 km	MPC · JPL
241133	2007 PF_{48}	—	August 13, 2007	Siding Spring	SSS	·	4.9 km	MPC · JPL
241134	2007 QE_{6}	—	August 21, 2007	Anderson Mesa	LONEOS	·	2.3 km	MPC · JPL
241135	2007 QO_{7}	—	August 21, 2007	Anderson Mesa	LONEOS	NYS	1.2 km	MPC · JPL
241136 Sandstede	2007 QY_{11}	Sandstede	August 25, 2007	Taunus	Karge, S., R. Kling	slow	3.0 km	MPC · JPL
241137	2007 QQ_{13}	—	August 24, 2007	Kitt Peak	Spacewatch	·	860 m	MPC · JPL
241138	2007 QG_{14}	—	August 16, 2007	Purple Mountain	PMO NEO Survey Program	·	1.9 km	MPC · JPL
241139	2007 QF_{15}	—	August 23, 2007	Kitt Peak	Spacewatch	·	3.0 km	MPC · JPL
241140	2007 QA_{17}	—	August 17, 2007	Socorro	LINEAR	·	1.6 km	MPC · JPL
241141	2007 RX_{5}	—	September 5, 2007	Dauban	Chante-Perdrix	·	1.8 km	MPC · JPL
241142	2007 RA_{7}	—	September 6, 2007	Dauban	Chante-Perdrix	·	1.7 km	MPC · JPL
241143	2007 RA_{15}	—	September 11, 2007	Dauban	Chante-Perdrix	·	2.0 km	MPC · JPL
241144	2007 RH_{19}	—	September 3, 2007	Catalina	CSS	·	760 m	MPC · JPL
241145	2007 RR_{21}	—	September 3, 2007	Catalina	CSS	NYS	1.5 km	MPC · JPL
241146	2007 RJ_{23}	—	September 3, 2007	Catalina	CSS	·	1.5 km	MPC · JPL
241147	2007 RM_{24}	—	September 3, 2007	Catalina	CSS	·	2.0 km	MPC · JPL
241148	2007 RP_{32}	—	September 5, 2007	Catalina	CSS	·	2.6 km	MPC · JPL
241149	2007 RR_{33}	—	September 5, 2007	Catalina	CSS	·	2.4 km	MPC · JPL
241150	2007 RS_{37}	—	September 8, 2007	Anderson Mesa	LONEOS	·	1.9 km	MPC · JPL
241151	2007 RT_{37}	—	September 8, 2007	Anderson Mesa	LONEOS	·	1.1 km	MPC · JPL
241152	2007 RJ_{38}	—	September 8, 2007	Anderson Mesa	LONEOS	·	5.4 km	MPC · JPL
241153 Omegagigia	2007 RQ_{39}	Omegagigia	September 8, 2007	La Cañada	Lacruz, J.	·	920 m	MPC · JPL
241154	2007 RQ_{48}	—	September 9, 2007	Mount Lemmon	Mount Lemmon Survey	·	4.2 km	MPC · JPL
241155	2007 RN_{56}	—	September 9, 2007	Anderson Mesa	LONEOS	·	3.3 km	MPC · JPL
241156	2007 RJ_{73}	—	September 10, 2007	Mount Lemmon	Mount Lemmon Survey	AST	1.8 km	MPC · JPL
241157	2007 RV_{77}	—	September 10, 2007	Mount Lemmon	Mount Lemmon Survey	·	2.1 km	MPC · JPL
241158	2007 RR_{81}	—	September 10, 2007	Mount Lemmon	Mount Lemmon Survey	·	5.3 km	MPC · JPL
241159	2007 RW_{85}	—	September 10, 2007	Mount Lemmon	Mount Lemmon Survey	·	1.5 km	MPC · JPL
241160	2007 RE_{91}	—	September 10, 2007	Mount Lemmon	Mount Lemmon Survey	·	3.3 km	MPC · JPL
241161	2007 RN_{93}	—	September 10, 2007	Kitt Peak	Spacewatch	NYS	2.1 km	MPC · JPL
241162	2007 RC_{98}	—	September 10, 2007	Kitt Peak	Spacewatch	·	1.7 km	MPC · JPL
241163	2007 RD_{110}	—	September 11, 2007	Mount Lemmon	Mount Lemmon Survey	·	3.1 km	MPC · JPL
241164	2007 RR_{115}	—	September 11, 2007	Kitt Peak	Spacewatch	AGN	1.5 km	MPC · JPL
241165	2007 RR_{134}	—	September 12, 2007	Anderson Mesa	LONEOS	ERI	2.5 km	MPC · JPL
241166	2007 RW_{134}	—	September 12, 2007	Anderson Mesa	LONEOS	·	1.6 km	MPC · JPL
241167	2007 RZ_{145}	—	September 14, 2007	Socorro	LINEAR	·	3.7 km	MPC · JPL
241168	2007 RE_{146}	—	September 15, 2007	Socorro	LINEAR	NYS	1.7 km	MPC · JPL
241169	2007 RT_{148}	—	September 12, 2007	Catalina	CSS	KOR	2.3 km	MPC · JPL
241170	2007 RX_{150}	—	September 9, 2007	Anderson Mesa	LONEOS	·	1.8 km	MPC · JPL
241171	2007 RC_{166}	—	September 10, 2007	Kitt Peak	Spacewatch	·	1.3 km	MPC · JPL
241172	2007 RW_{204}	—	September 9, 2007	Kitt Peak	Spacewatch	WIT	1.4 km	MPC · JPL
241173	2007 RC_{207}	—	September 10, 2007	Kitt Peak	Spacewatch	·	2.0 km	MPC · JPL
241174	2007 RC_{212}	—	September 11, 2007	Kitt Peak	Spacewatch	·	1.7 km	MPC · JPL
241175	2007 RV_{216}	—	September 13, 2007	Anderson Mesa	LONEOS	NYS	1.7 km	MPC · JPL
241176	2007 RK_{222}	—	September 14, 2007	Mount Lemmon	Mount Lemmon Survey	HOF	2.8 km	MPC · JPL
241177	2007 RZ_{227}	—	September 10, 2007	Mount Lemmon	Mount Lemmon Survey	·	2.3 km	MPC · JPL
241178	2007 RK_{234}	—	September 12, 2007	Catalina	CSS	·	1.9 km	MPC · JPL
241179	2007 RK_{241}	—	September 12, 2007	Catalina	CSS	·	1.1 km	MPC · JPL
241180	2007 RZ_{242}	—	September 15, 2007	Socorro	LINEAR	MRX	1.6 km	MPC · JPL
241181	2007 RH_{243}	—	September 15, 2007	Socorro	LINEAR	·	1.5 km	MPC · JPL
241182	2007 RH_{245}	—	September 11, 2007	Kitt Peak	Spacewatch	·	1.1 km	MPC · JPL
241183	2007 RU_{246}	—	September 12, 2007	Catalina	CSS	·	3.5 km	MPC · JPL
241184	2007 RZ_{258}	—	September 14, 2007	Catalina	CSS	·	2.4 km	MPC · JPL
241185	2007 RR_{281}	—	September 14, 2007	Catalina	CSS	·	1.7 km	MPC · JPL
241186	2007 RN_{285}	—	September 13, 2007	Mount Lemmon	Mount Lemmon Survey	NAE	3.8 km	MPC · JPL
241187	2007 RF_{287}	—	September 9, 2007	Kitt Peak	Spacewatch	KOR	2.3 km	MPC · JPL
241188	2007 RA_{293}	—	September 12, 2007	Mount Lemmon	Mount Lemmon Survey	THM	2.7 km	MPC · JPL
241189	2007 RP_{299}	—	September 12, 2007	Mount Lemmon	Mount Lemmon Survey	·	1.7 km	MPC · JPL
241190	2007 RF_{317}	—	September 10, 2007	Mount Lemmon	Mount Lemmon Survey	·	1.8 km	MPC · JPL
241191	2007 RM_{317}	—	September 10, 2007	Mount Lemmon	Mount Lemmon Survey	KOR	1.4 km	MPC · JPL
241192 Pulyny	2007 SH_{6}	Pulyny	September 21, 2007	Andrushivka	Andrushivka	·	1.7 km	MPC · JPL
241193	2007 SN_{9}	—	September 18, 2007	Kitt Peak	Spacewatch	·	1.7 km	MPC · JPL
241194	2007 SX_{10}	—	September 21, 2007	Bergisch Gladbach	W. Bickel	·	2.1 km	MPC · JPL
241195	2007 ST_{16}	—	September 30, 2007	Kitt Peak	Spacewatch	MRX	1.4 km	MPC · JPL
241196	2007 SE_{19}	—	September 27, 2007	Mount Lemmon	Mount Lemmon Survey	·	3.3 km	MPC · JPL
241197	2007 SJ_{20}	—	September 21, 2007	Purple Mountain	PMO NEO Survey Program	HOF	3.6 km	MPC · JPL
241198	2007 TU_{4}	—	October 6, 2007	7300	W. K. Y. Yeung	·	1.4 km	MPC · JPL
241199	2007 TN_{11}	—	October 6, 2007	Socorro	LINEAR	HOF	3.6 km	MPC · JPL
241200	2007 TE_{13}	—	October 6, 2007	Socorro	LINEAR	·	2.0 km	MPC · JPL

== 241201–241300 ==
back to top

Designation			Discovery			Properties		Ref
Permanent	Provisional	Named after	Date	Site	Discoverer(s)	Category	Diam.	Ref
241201	2007 TM_{20}	—	October 8, 2007	Socorro	LINEAR	·	3.3 km	MPC · JPL
241202	2007 TP_{25}	—	October 4, 2007	Kitt Peak	Spacewatch	·	2.4 km	MPC · JPL
241203	2007 TE_{27}	—	October 4, 2007	Kitt Peak	Spacewatch	·	1.9 km	MPC · JPL
241204	2007 TV_{28}	—	October 4, 2007	Kitt Peak	Spacewatch	·	2.1 km	MPC · JPL
241205	2007 TF_{31}	—	October 4, 2007	Kitt Peak	Spacewatch	·	4.2 km	MPC · JPL
241206	2007 TE_{35}	—	October 6, 2007	Kitt Peak	Spacewatch	·	3.8 km	MPC · JPL
241207	2007 TA_{39}	—	October 6, 2007	Kitt Peak	Spacewatch	·	4.3 km	MPC · JPL
241208	2007 TB_{41}	—	October 6, 2007	Kitt Peak	Spacewatch	·	5.3 km	MPC · JPL
241209	2007 TZ_{41}	—	October 7, 2007	Mount Lemmon	Mount Lemmon Survey	·	3.0 km	MPC · JPL
241210	2007 TF_{43}	—	October 7, 2007	Mount Lemmon	Mount Lemmon Survey	·	3.4 km	MPC · JPL
241211	2007 TW_{45}	—	October 7, 2007	Catalina	CSS	·	3.0 km	MPC · JPL
241212	2007 TT_{50}	—	October 4, 2007	Kitt Peak	Spacewatch	·	2.5 km	MPC · JPL
241213	2007 TG_{61}	—	October 7, 2007	Mount Lemmon	Mount Lemmon Survey	·	3.1 km	MPC · JPL
241214	2007 TP_{61}	—	October 7, 2007	Mount Lemmon	Mount Lemmon Survey	HOF	3.0 km	MPC · JPL
241215	2007 TA_{63}	—	October 7, 2007	Mount Lemmon	Mount Lemmon Survey	·	2.6 km	MPC · JPL
241216	2007 TM_{63}	—	October 7, 2007	Mount Lemmon	Mount Lemmon Survey	·	3.2 km	MPC · JPL
241217	2007 TF_{65}	—	October 7, 2007	Mount Lemmon	Mount Lemmon Survey	·	6.1 km	MPC · JPL
241218	2007 TK_{68}	—	October 12, 2007	7300	W. K. Y. Yeung	HOF	3.5 km	MPC · JPL
241219	2007 TV_{70}	—	October 13, 2007	Mayhill	Lowe, A.	·	4.1 km	MPC · JPL
241220	2007 TF_{80}	—	October 7, 2007	Catalina	CSS	MAS	940 m	MPC · JPL
241221	2007 TO_{80}	—	October 7, 2007	Catalina	CSS	KOR	2.0 km	MPC · JPL
241222	2007 TL_{93}	—	October 6, 2007	Kitt Peak	Spacewatch	·	2.6 km	MPC · JPL
241223	2007 TJ_{95}	—	October 7, 2007	Catalina	CSS	TIR	4.1 km	MPC · JPL
241224	2007 TB_{103}	—	October 8, 2007	Mount Lemmon	Mount Lemmon Survey	·	2.5 km	MPC · JPL
241225	2007 TE_{111}	—	October 8, 2007	Catalina	CSS	EUN	2.0 km	MPC · JPL
241226	2007 TX_{120}	—	October 4, 2007	Kitt Peak	Spacewatch	·	2.4 km	MPC · JPL
241227	2007 TE_{123}	—	October 6, 2007	Kitt Peak	Spacewatch	·	1.7 km	MPC · JPL
241228	2007 TH_{146}	—	October 6, 2007	Socorro	LINEAR	·	2.4 km	MPC · JPL
241229	2007 TK_{149}	—	October 8, 2007	Socorro	LINEAR	·	3.3 km	MPC · JPL
241230	2007 TD_{161}	—	October 11, 2007	Socorro	LINEAR	KOR	2.0 km	MPC · JPL
241231	2007 TL_{169}	—	October 12, 2007	Socorro	LINEAR	·	1.9 km	MPC · JPL
241232	2007 TA_{178}	—	October 6, 2007	Kitt Peak	Spacewatch	·	1.8 km	MPC · JPL
241233	2007 TV_{179}	—	October 7, 2007	Mount Lemmon	Mount Lemmon Survey	·	2.8 km	MPC · JPL
241234	2007 TW_{185}	—	October 13, 2007	Socorro	LINEAR	EUN	1.5 km	MPC · JPL
241235	2007 TK_{188}	—	October 13, 2007	Kitt Peak	Spacewatch	HOF	2.9 km	MPC · JPL
241236	2007 TB_{190}	—	October 4, 2007	Mount Lemmon	Mount Lemmon Survey	·	1.8 km	MPC · JPL
241237	2007 TJ_{192}	—	October 5, 2007	Kitt Peak	Spacewatch	·	2.0 km	MPC · JPL
241238	2007 TG_{194}	—	October 7, 2007	Catalina	CSS	EOS	3.8 km	MPC · JPL
241239	2007 TJ_{194}	—	October 7, 2007	Catalina	CSS	·	3.2 km	MPC · JPL
241240	2007 TZ_{199}	—	October 8, 2007	Kitt Peak	Spacewatch	·	2.3 km	MPC · JPL
241241	2007 TR_{204}	—	October 8, 2007	Mount Lemmon	Mount Lemmon Survey	·	3.4 km	MPC · JPL
241242	2007 TC_{208}	—	October 10, 2007	Catalina	CSS	WIT	1.2 km	MPC · JPL
241243	2007 TE_{208}	—	October 10, 2007	Mount Lemmon	Mount Lemmon Survey	KOR	1.6 km	MPC · JPL
241244	2007 TA_{217}	—	October 7, 2007	Kitt Peak	Spacewatch	·	7.1 km	MPC · JPL
241245	2007 TE_{218}	—	October 7, 2007	Kitt Peak	Spacewatch	·	1.3 km	MPC · JPL
241246	2007 TF_{228}	—	October 8, 2007	Kitt Peak	Spacewatch	·	3.1 km	MPC · JPL
241247	2007 TG_{229}	—	October 8, 2007	Kitt Peak	Spacewatch	KOR	1.7 km	MPC · JPL
241248	2007 TN_{230}	—	October 8, 2007	Kitt Peak	Spacewatch	·	1.7 km	MPC · JPL
241249	2007 TS_{233}	—	October 8, 2007	Kitt Peak	Spacewatch	THM	2.9 km	MPC · JPL
241250	2007 TT_{233}	—	October 8, 2007	Kitt Peak	Spacewatch	·	2.5 km	MPC · JPL
241251	2007 TQ_{234}	—	October 8, 2007	Purple Mountain	PMO NEO Survey Program	·	3.2 km	MPC · JPL
241252	2007 TT_{246}	—	October 9, 2007	Mount Lemmon	Mount Lemmon Survey	·	2.2 km	MPC · JPL
241253	2007 TE_{268}	—	October 9, 2007	Kitt Peak	Spacewatch	·	3.4 km	MPC · JPL
241254	2007 TS_{279}	—	October 12, 2007	Mount Lemmon	Mount Lemmon Survey	·	2.9 km	MPC · JPL
241255	2007 TU_{279}	—	October 12, 2007	Mount Lemmon	Mount Lemmon Survey	MAR	1.6 km	MPC · JPL
241256	2007 TS_{288}	—	October 11, 2007	Catalina	CSS	·	2.5 km	MPC · JPL
241257	2007 TN_{299}	—	October 12, 2007	Kitt Peak	Spacewatch	·	2.2 km	MPC · JPL
241258	2007 TL_{310}	—	October 11, 2007	Kitt Peak	Spacewatch	KOR	1.8 km	MPC · JPL
241259	2007 TV_{314}	—	October 12, 2007	Mount Lemmon	Mount Lemmon Survey	·	1.7 km	MPC · JPL
241260	2007 TK_{316}	—	October 12, 2007	Kitt Peak	Spacewatch	·	7.0 km	MPC · JPL
241261	2007 TK_{334}	—	October 11, 2007	Kitt Peak	Spacewatch	PHO	3.1 km	MPC · JPL
241262	2007 TK_{339}	—	October 8, 2007	Mount Lemmon	Mount Lemmon Survey	·	1.5 km	MPC · JPL
241263	2007 TB_{350}	—	October 14, 2007	Mount Lemmon	Mount Lemmon Survey	MAS	1.2 km	MPC · JPL
241264	2007 TZ_{378}	—	October 13, 2007	Catalina	CSS	·	3.2 km	MPC · JPL
241265	2007 TH_{381}	—	October 14, 2007	Kitt Peak	Spacewatch	·	1.6 km	MPC · JPL
241266	2007 TO_{389}	—	October 13, 2007	Catalina	CSS	HOF	3.0 km	MPC · JPL
241267	2007 TM_{393}	—	October 13, 2007	Mount Lemmon	Mount Lemmon Survey	PAD	2.9 km	MPC · JPL
241268	2007 TY_{397}	—	October 15, 2007	Kitt Peak	Spacewatch	·	4.6 km	MPC · JPL
241269	2007 TM_{404}	—	October 15, 2007	Kitt Peak	Spacewatch	·	3.8 km	MPC · JPL
241270	2007 TT_{410}	—	October 15, 2007	Anderson Mesa	LONEOS	·	4.7 km	MPC · JPL
241271	2007 TG_{413}	—	October 15, 2007	Catalina	CSS	·	4.8 km	MPC · JPL
241272	2007 TZ_{418}	—	October 10, 2007	Kitt Peak	Spacewatch	·	1.4 km	MPC · JPL
241273	2007 TV_{423}	—	October 7, 2007	Mount Lemmon	Mount Lemmon Survey	·	2.6 km	MPC · JPL
241274	2007 TW_{424}	—	October 8, 2007	Kitt Peak	Spacewatch	·	3.1 km	MPC · JPL
241275	2007 TU_{430}	—	October 7, 2007	Mount Lemmon	Mount Lemmon Survey	·	3.9 km	MPC · JPL
241276 Guntramlampert	2007 TF_{436}	Guntramlampert	October 7, 2007	Gaisberg	Gierlinger, R.	·	2.1 km	MPC · JPL
241277	2007 TW_{437}	—	October 13, 2007	Socorro	LINEAR	NYS	1.5 km	MPC · JPL
241278	2007 TX_{437}	—	October 13, 2007	Socorro	LINEAR	·	3.6 km	MPC · JPL
241279	2007 TP_{442}	—	October 8, 2007	Mount Lemmon	Mount Lemmon Survey	MAR	1.4 km	MPC · JPL
241280	2007 UA_{1}	—	October 16, 2007	Bisei SG Center	BATTeRS	·	4.4 km	MPC · JPL
241281	2007 UF_{2}	—	October 18, 2007	Mayhill	Lowe, A.	·	1.5 km	MPC · JPL
241282	2007 UD_{4}	—	October 18, 2007	Socorro	LINEAR	·	2.7 km	MPC · JPL
241283	2007 UC_{10}	—	October 17, 2007	Anderson Mesa	LONEOS	·	3.0 km	MPC · JPL
241284	2007 UL_{11}	—	October 19, 2007	Socorro	LINEAR	·	2.9 km	MPC · JPL
241285	2007 UH_{13}	—	October 16, 2007	Mount Lemmon	Mount Lemmon Survey	·	1.9 km	MPC · JPL
241286	2007 UB_{29}	—	October 18, 2007	Catalina	CSS	ERI	3.1 km	MPC · JPL
241287	2007 UG_{29}	—	October 18, 2007	Mount Lemmon	Mount Lemmon Survey	KOR	1.7 km	MPC · JPL
241288	2007 UN_{30}	—	October 19, 2007	Catalina	CSS	·	3.9 km	MPC · JPL
241289	2007 UY_{31}	—	October 19, 2007	Mount Lemmon	Mount Lemmon Survey	NYS	1.3 km	MPC · JPL
241290	2007 UZ_{43}	—	October 18, 2007	Mount Lemmon	Mount Lemmon Survey	·	2.7 km	MPC · JPL
241291	2007 UY_{44}	—	October 18, 2007	Mount Lemmon	Mount Lemmon Survey	·	3.8 km	MPC · JPL
241292	2007 UR_{49}	—	October 24, 2007	Mount Lemmon	Mount Lemmon Survey	(5)	1.7 km	MPC · JPL
241293	2007 UF_{51}	—	October 24, 2007	Mount Lemmon	Mount Lemmon Survey	·	5.1 km	MPC · JPL
241294	2007 UH_{51}	—	October 24, 2007	Mount Lemmon	Mount Lemmon Survey	·	5.6 km	MPC · JPL
241295	2007 UB_{52}	—	October 24, 2007	Mount Lemmon	Mount Lemmon Survey	EOS	3.5 km	MPC · JPL
241296	2007 UO_{52}	—	October 24, 2007	Mount Lemmon	Mount Lemmon Survey	·	2.4 km	MPC · JPL
241297	2007 UD_{59}	—	October 30, 2007	Mount Lemmon	Mount Lemmon Survey	·	2.9 km	MPC · JPL
241298	2007 UH_{68}	—	October 30, 2007	Kitt Peak	Spacewatch	THM	2.8 km	MPC · JPL
241299	2007 UU_{78}	—	October 30, 2007	Mount Lemmon	Mount Lemmon Survey	·	2.2 km	MPC · JPL
241300	2007 UH_{81}	—	October 30, 2007	Kitt Peak	Spacewatch	·	1.4 km	MPC · JPL

== 241301–241400 ==
back to top

Designation			Discovery			Properties		Ref
Permanent	Provisional	Named after	Date	Site	Discoverer(s)	Category	Diam.	Ref
241301	2007 US_{89}	—	October 30, 2007	Mount Lemmon	Mount Lemmon Survey	MRX	1.5 km	MPC · JPL
241302	2007 UK_{90}	—	October 30, 2007	Mount Lemmon	Mount Lemmon Survey	·	2.9 km	MPC · JPL
241303	2007 UD_{98}	—	October 30, 2007	Mount Lemmon	Mount Lemmon Survey	fast	4.3 km	MPC · JPL
241304	2007 UE_{113}	—	October 30, 2007	Kitt Peak	Spacewatch	·	5.4 km	MPC · JPL
241305	2007 UT_{113}	—	October 31, 2007	Kitt Peak	Spacewatch	·	5.8 km	MPC · JPL
241306	2007 UM_{135}	—	October 20, 2007	Kitt Peak	Spacewatch	HYG	3.3 km	MPC · JPL
241307	2007 UE_{136}	—	October 30, 2007	Catalina	CSS	·	5.1 km	MPC · JPL
241308	2007 VQ	—	November 1, 2007	Kitt Peak	Spacewatch	·	3.0 km	MPC · JPL
241309	2007 VL_{2}	—	November 2, 2007	La Cañada	Lacruz, J.	KOR	1.7 km	MPC · JPL
241310	2007 VM_{2}	—	November 2, 2007	La Cañada	Lacruz, J.	KOR	1.7 km	MPC · JPL
241311	2007 VM_{7}	—	November 2, 2007	Goodricke-Pigott	R. A. Tucker	·	5.6 km	MPC · JPL
241312	2007 VA_{13}	—	November 1, 2007	Mount Lemmon	Mount Lemmon Survey	KOR	1.5 km	MPC · JPL
241313	2007 VV_{20}	—	November 2, 2007	Mount Lemmon	Mount Lemmon Survey	·	2.1 km	MPC · JPL
241314	2007 VG_{33}	—	November 2, 2007	Kitt Peak	Spacewatch	·	2.4 km	MPC · JPL
241315	2007 VJ_{35}	—	November 1, 2007	Mount Lemmon	Mount Lemmon Survey	·	2.1 km	MPC · JPL
241316	2007 VW_{57}	—	November 1, 2007	Kitt Peak	Spacewatch	HOF	3.2 km	MPC · JPL
241317	2007 VL_{59}	—	November 1, 2007	Kitt Peak	Spacewatch	·	4.0 km	MPC · JPL
241318	2007 VM_{70}	—	November 4, 2007	Mount Lemmon	Mount Lemmon Survey	·	2.7 km	MPC · JPL
241319	2007 VF_{73}	—	November 2, 2007	7300	W. K. Y. Yeung	·	2.1 km	MPC · JPL
241320	2007 VZ_{87}	—	November 2, 2007	Socorro	LINEAR	·	1.9 km	MPC · JPL
241321	2007 VQ_{94}	—	November 7, 2007	Bisei SG Center	BATTeRS	EOS	2.7 km	MPC · JPL
241322	2007 VH_{98}	—	November 2, 2007	Kitt Peak	Spacewatch	·	2.0 km	MPC · JPL
241323	2007 VS_{102}	—	November 3, 2007	Kitt Peak	Spacewatch	KOR	1.6 km	MPC · JPL
241324	2007 VL_{109}	—	November 3, 2007	Kitt Peak	Spacewatch	·	2.8 km	MPC · JPL
241325	2007 VO_{113}	—	November 3, 2007	Kitt Peak	Spacewatch	·	3.8 km	MPC · JPL
241326	2007 VZ_{126}	—	November 11, 2007	Bisei SG Center	BATTeRS	·	3.2 km	MPC · JPL
241327	2007 VW_{134}	—	November 3, 2007	Anderson Mesa	LONEOS	AGN	1.5 km	MPC · JPL
241328	2007 VR_{155}	—	November 5, 2007	Kitt Peak	Spacewatch	·	4.0 km	MPC · JPL
241329	2007 VV_{158}	—	November 5, 2007	Kitt Peak	Spacewatch	·	4.9 km	MPC · JPL
241330	2007 VB_{166}	—	November 5, 2007	Kitt Peak	Spacewatch	·	2.9 km	MPC · JPL
241331	2007 VJ_{169}	—	November 5, 2007	Kitt Peak	Spacewatch	·	4.3 km	MPC · JPL
241332	2007 VH_{200}	—	November 9, 2007	Mount Lemmon	Mount Lemmon Survey	·	2.0 km	MPC · JPL
241333	2007 VR_{202}	—	November 7, 2007	Catalina	CSS	·	2.8 km	MPC · JPL
241334	2007 VV_{206}	—	November 9, 2007	Catalina	CSS	·	2.7 km	MPC · JPL
241335	2007 VB_{210}	—	November 9, 2007	Kitt Peak	Spacewatch	AGN	1.6 km	MPC · JPL
241336	2007 VU_{219}	—	November 9, 2007	Kitt Peak	Spacewatch	NAE	4.4 km	MPC · JPL
241337	2007 VJ_{241}	—	November 12, 2007	Catalina	CSS	·	3.6 km	MPC · JPL
241338	2007 VB_{243}	—	November 13, 2007	Mount Lemmon	Mount Lemmon Survey	·	1.5 km	MPC · JPL
241339	2007 VL_{269}	—	November 14, 2007	Socorro	LINEAR	(5)	1.5 km	MPC · JPL
241340	2007 VB_{273}	—	November 12, 2007	Catalina	CSS	·	2.7 km	MPC · JPL
241341	2007 VS_{299}	—	November 12, 2007	Catalina	CSS	·	3.0 km	MPC · JPL
241342	2007 VY_{314}	—	November 2, 2007	Catalina	CSS	·	3.3 km	MPC · JPL
241343	2007 VO_{320}	—	November 11, 2007	Mount Lemmon	Mount Lemmon Survey	·	6.3 km	MPC · JPL
241344	2007 WT_{6}	—	November 18, 2007	Socorro	LINEAR	·	3.7 km	MPC · JPL
241345	2007 WF_{17}	—	November 18, 2007	Mount Lemmon	Mount Lemmon Survey	GEF	1.6 km	MPC · JPL
241346	2007 WM_{19}	—	November 18, 2007	Mount Lemmon	Mount Lemmon Survey	EOS	2.4 km	MPC · JPL
241347	2007 WP_{23}	—	November 18, 2007	Mount Lemmon	Mount Lemmon Survey	·	2.9 km	MPC · JPL
241348	2007 WX_{24}	—	November 18, 2007	Mount Lemmon	Mount Lemmon Survey	·	3.1 km	MPC · JPL
241349	2007 WB_{25}	—	November 18, 2007	Mount Lemmon	Mount Lemmon Survey	·	2.8 km	MPC · JPL
241350	2007 WB_{26}	—	November 18, 2007	Mount Lemmon	Mount Lemmon Survey	·	1.9 km	MPC · JPL
241351	2007 WO_{39}	—	November 17, 2007	Catalina	CSS	·	2.9 km	MPC · JPL
241352	2007 WL_{47}	—	November 20, 2007	Mount Lemmon	Mount Lemmon Survey	·	2.4 km	MPC · JPL
241353	2007 WL_{49}	—	November 20, 2007	Mount Lemmon	Mount Lemmon Survey	·	3.1 km	MPC · JPL
241354	2007 WC_{56}	—	November 30, 2007	Lulin	Yang, T.-C., Q. Ye	TEL	2.2 km	MPC · JPL
241355	2007 WE_{58}	—	November 18, 2007	Mount Lemmon	Mount Lemmon Survey	·	4.5 km	MPC · JPL
241356	2007 WR_{58}	—	November 17, 2007	Kitt Peak	Spacewatch	·	2.3 km	MPC · JPL
241357	2007 WU_{58}	—	November 19, 2007	Kitt Peak	Spacewatch	·	4.2 km	MPC · JPL
241358	2007 WO_{60}	—	November 18, 2007	Mount Lemmon	Mount Lemmon Survey	EOS	2.8 km	MPC · JPL
241359	2007 XD_{1}	—	December 3, 2007	Catalina	CSS	·	3.7 km	MPC · JPL
241360	2007 XG_{7}	—	December 4, 2007	Mount Lemmon	Mount Lemmon Survey	THM	2.3 km	MPC · JPL
241361	2007 XO_{15}	—	December 8, 2007	Bisei SG Center	BATTeRS	·	4.6 km	MPC · JPL
241362 Nesiotites	2007 YH_{2}	Nesiotites	December 18, 2007	Costitx	OAM	·	3.8 km	MPC · JPL
241363 Érdibálint	2007 YA_{4}	Érdibálint	December 19, 2007	Piszkéstető	K. Sárneczky	·	9.8 km	MPC · JPL
241364 Reneangelil	2008 AR_{2}	Reneangelil	January 7, 2008	Vicques	M. Ory	·	4.4 km	MPC · JPL
241365	2008 AO_{3}	—	January 9, 2008	Vail-Jarnac	Jarnac	·	5.3 km	MPC · JPL
241366	2008 AY_{5}	—	January 10, 2008	Mount Lemmon	Mount Lemmon Survey	·	2.5 km	MPC · JPL
241367	2008 AH_{60}	—	January 11, 2008	Kitt Peak	Spacewatch	·	5.0 km	MPC · JPL
241368 Hildjózsef	2008 DL	Hildjózsef	February 24, 2008	Piszkéstető	K. Sárneczky	·	2.6 km	MPC · JPL
241369	2008 KB_{43}	—	May 29, 2008	Mount Lemmon	Mount Lemmon Survey	H	650 m	MPC · JPL
241370	2008 LW_{8}	—	June 9, 2008	Catalina	CSS	AMO · APO +1km	760 m	MPC · JPL
241371	2008 QK_{5}	—	August 22, 2008	Kitt Peak	Spacewatch	·	3.4 km	MPC · JPL
241372	2008 QP_{31}	—	August 30, 2008	Socorro	LINEAR	·	4.5 km	MPC · JPL
241373 Richardmoissl	2008 RM	Richardmoissl	September 2, 2008	Kleť	KLENOT	·	3.9 km	MPC · JPL
241374	2008 RA_{65}	—	September 4, 2008	Kitt Peak	Spacewatch	·	2.0 km	MPC · JPL
241375	2008 RC_{98}	—	September 7, 2008	Mount Lemmon	Mount Lemmon Survey	·	1.4 km	MPC · JPL
241376	2008 RK_{108}	—	September 9, 2008	Mount Lemmon	Mount Lemmon Survey	T_{j} (2.95) · HIL	6.2 km	MPC · JPL
241377	2008 RK_{120}	—	September 9, 2008	Mount Lemmon	Mount Lemmon Survey	·	790 m	MPC · JPL
241378	2008 SY_{75}	—	September 23, 2008	Mount Lemmon	Mount Lemmon Survey	·	1.7 km	MPC · JPL
241379	2008 SW_{77}	—	September 23, 2008	Mount Lemmon	Mount Lemmon Survey	·	1.8 km	MPC · JPL
241380	2008 SQ_{108}	—	September 22, 2008	Mount Lemmon	Mount Lemmon Survey	KON	2.6 km	MPC · JPL
241381	2008 SO_{141}	—	September 24, 2008	Goodricke-Pigott	R. A. Tucker	·	5.4 km	MPC · JPL
241382	2008 SJ_{143}	—	September 24, 2008	Mount Lemmon	Mount Lemmon Survey	·	4.1 km	MPC · JPL
241383	2008 SX_{146}	—	September 23, 2008	Mount Lemmon	Mount Lemmon Survey	·	3.7 km	MPC · JPL
241384	2008 SG_{166}	—	September 28, 2008	Socorro	LINEAR	·	1.8 km	MPC · JPL
241385	2008 SQ_{182}	—	September 24, 2008	Mount Lemmon	Mount Lemmon Survey	·	720 m	MPC · JPL
241386	2008 SN_{200}	—	September 26, 2008	Kitt Peak	Spacewatch	·	2.3 km	MPC · JPL
241387	2008 SP_{243}	—	September 29, 2008	Kitt Peak	Spacewatch	·	1.4 km	MPC · JPL
241388	2008 SP_{262}	—	September 24, 2008	Mount Lemmon	Mount Lemmon Survey	JUN	1.4 km	MPC · JPL
241389	2008 SY_{265}	—	September 29, 2008	Kitt Peak	Spacewatch	·	1.1 km	MPC · JPL
241390	2008 SF_{273}	—	September 23, 2008	Catalina	CSS	·	2.1 km	MPC · JPL
241391	2008 SY_{273}	—	September 21, 2008	Kitt Peak	Spacewatch	NYS	1.5 km	MPC · JPL
241392	2008 SA_{285}	—	September 27, 2008	Mount Lemmon	Mount Lemmon Survey	·	900 m	MPC · JPL
241393	2008 SK_{290}	—	September 29, 2008	Catalina	CSS	·	3.2 km	MPC · JPL
241394	2008 SN_{309}	—	September 29, 2008	Mount Lemmon	Mount Lemmon Survey	·	2.0 km	MPC · JPL
241395	2008 TP_{52}	—	October 2, 2008	Kitt Peak	Spacewatch	·	1.0 km	MPC · JPL
241396	2008 TR_{75}	—	October 2, 2008	Kitt Peak	Spacewatch	·	1.7 km	MPC · JPL
241397	2008 TN_{106}	—	October 6, 2008	Kitt Peak	Spacewatch	H	900 m	MPC · JPL
241398	2008 TP_{126}	—	October 8, 2008	Mount Lemmon	Mount Lemmon Survey	·	2.5 km	MPC · JPL
241399	2008 TL_{136}	—	October 8, 2008	Kitt Peak	Spacewatch	·	1.3 km	MPC · JPL
241400	2008 TC_{160}	—	October 1, 2008	Kitt Peak	Spacewatch	(32418)	3.0 km	MPC · JPL

== 241401–241500 ==
back to top

Designation			Discovery			Properties		Ref
Permanent	Provisional	Named after	Date	Site	Discoverer(s)	Category	Diam.	Ref
241401	2008 TF_{170}	—	October 8, 2008	Catalina	CSS	·	820 m	MPC · JPL
241402	2008 TF_{190}	—	October 6, 2008	Mount Lemmon	Mount Lemmon Survey	EOS	2.7 km	MPC · JPL
241403	2008 UM_{28}	—	October 20, 2008	Kitt Peak	Spacewatch	·	1.4 km	MPC · JPL
241404	2008 UP_{75}	—	October 21, 2008	Kitt Peak	Spacewatch	·	1.6 km	MPC · JPL
241405	2008 UV_{75}	—	October 21, 2008	Kitt Peak	Spacewatch	HOF	3.1 km	MPC · JPL
241406	2008 UE_{76}	—	October 21, 2008	Kitt Peak	Spacewatch	·	1.1 km	MPC · JPL
241407	2008 UF_{78}	—	October 21, 2008	Mount Lemmon	Mount Lemmon Survey	·	840 m	MPC · JPL
241408	2008 UB_{91}	—	October 26, 2008	Socorro	LINEAR	·	3.1 km	MPC · JPL
241409	2008 US_{99}	—	October 30, 2008	Sandlot	G. Hug	·	3.4 km	MPC · JPL
241410	2008 UM_{111}	—	October 22, 2008	Kitt Peak	Spacewatch	·	3.5 km	MPC · JPL
241411	2008 UK_{113}	—	October 22, 2008	Kitt Peak	Spacewatch	HOF	4.4 km	MPC · JPL
241412	2008 UW_{127}	—	October 22, 2008	Kitt Peak	Spacewatch	·	6.0 km	MPC · JPL
241413	2008 UK_{139}	—	October 23, 2008	Kitt Peak	Spacewatch	·	3.4 km	MPC · JPL
241414	2008 UD_{160}	—	October 23, 2008	Kitt Peak	Spacewatch	(5)	1.9 km	MPC · JPL
241415	2008 US_{186}	—	October 24, 2008	Kitt Peak	Spacewatch	·	890 m	MPC · JPL
241416	2008 UN_{198}	—	October 26, 2008	Socorro	LINEAR	·	2.0 km	MPC · JPL
241417	2008 UY_{200}	—	October 27, 2008	Socorro	LINEAR	·	2.6 km	MPC · JPL
241418 Darmstadt	2008 UX_{201}	Darmstadt	October 31, 2008	Tzec Maun	E. Schwab	·	4.7 km	MPC · JPL
241419	2008 US_{207}	—	October 23, 2008	Kitt Peak	Spacewatch	·	3.3 km	MPC · JPL
241420	2008 UH_{230}	—	October 25, 2008	Kitt Peak	Spacewatch	·	2.0 km	MPC · JPL
241421	2008 UA_{244}	—	October 26, 2008	Kitt Peak	Spacewatch	·	3.7 km	MPC · JPL
241422	2008 UH_{245}	—	October 26, 2008	Kitt Peak	Spacewatch	·	4.7 km	MPC · JPL
241423	2008 UE_{247}	—	October 26, 2008	Kitt Peak	Spacewatch	·	1.3 km	MPC · JPL
241424	2008 UR_{326}	—	October 31, 2008	Mount Lemmon	Mount Lemmon Survey	·	2.1 km	MPC · JPL
241425	2008 UV_{326}	—	October 31, 2008	Mount Lemmon	Mount Lemmon Survey	·	2.3 km	MPC · JPL
241426	2008 UQ_{331}	—	October 31, 2008	Kitt Peak	Spacewatch	(13314)	2.7 km	MPC · JPL
241427	2008 UY_{341}	—	October 27, 2008	Kitt Peak	Spacewatch	GEF	1.6 km	MPC · JPL
241428	2008 VA_{67}	—	November 6, 2008	Mount Lemmon	Mount Lemmon Survey	·	1.4 km	MPC · JPL
241429	2008 VY_{70}	—	November 8, 2008	Kitt Peak	Spacewatch	·	900 m	MPC · JPL
241430	2008 VV_{75}	—	November 7, 2008	Catalina	CSS	·	2.0 km	MPC · JPL
241431	2008 WF_{85}	—	November 20, 2008	Kitt Peak	Spacewatch	·	2.0 km	MPC · JPL
241432	2008 WG_{93}	—	November 21, 2008	Mount Lemmon	Mount Lemmon Survey	·	2.6 km	MPC · JPL
241433	2008 WZ_{95}	—	November 23, 2008	Socorro	LINEAR	(5)	2.2 km	MPC · JPL
241434	2008 WU_{107}	—	November 30, 2008	Mount Lemmon	Mount Lemmon Survey	·	1 km	MPC · JPL
241435	2008 WC_{116}	—	November 30, 2008	Kitt Peak	Spacewatch	AGN	1.8 km	MPC · JPL
241436	2008 WH_{123}	—	November 30, 2008	Mount Lemmon	Mount Lemmon Survey	·	5.2 km	MPC · JPL
241437	2008 WU_{138}	—	November 21, 2008	Kitt Peak	Spacewatch	HOF	3.0 km	MPC · JPL
241438	2008 XL_{12}	—	December 2, 2008	Mount Lemmon	Mount Lemmon Survey	NAE	4.3 km	MPC · JPL
241439	2008 XT_{20}	—	December 1, 2008	Kitt Peak	Spacewatch	THM	2.6 km	MPC · JPL
241440	2008 XP_{55}	—	December 6, 2008	Socorro	LINEAR	·	1.7 km	MPC · JPL
241441	2008 XV_{55}	—	December 3, 2008	Mount Lemmon	Mount Lemmon Survey	·	5.6 km	MPC · JPL
241442 Shandongkexie	2008 YN_{9}	Shandongkexie	December 25, 2008	Weihai	University, Shandong	·	4.1 km	MPC · JPL
241443	2008 YN_{15}	—	December 21, 2008	Kitt Peak	Spacewatch	KOR	1.8 km	MPC · JPL
241444	2008 YJ_{21}	—	December 21, 2008	Mount Lemmon	Mount Lemmon Survey	KOR	1.5 km	MPC · JPL
241445	2008 YE_{23}	—	December 18, 2008	La Sagra	OAM	·	2.4 km	MPC · JPL
241446	2008 YB_{62}	—	December 30, 2008	Mount Lemmon	Mount Lemmon Survey	·	3.2 km	MPC · JPL
241447	2008 YN_{78}	—	December 30, 2008	Mount Lemmon	Mount Lemmon Survey	·	1.6 km	MPC · JPL
241448	2008 YV_{88}	—	December 29, 2008	Kitt Peak	Spacewatch	·	1.0 km	MPC · JPL
241449	2008 YJ_{97}	—	December 29, 2008	Mount Lemmon	Mount Lemmon Survey	·	5.7 km	MPC · JPL
241450	2008 YX_{98}	—	December 29, 2008	Kitt Peak	Spacewatch	AST	2.9 km	MPC · JPL
241451	2008 YC_{102}	—	December 29, 2008	Kitt Peak	Spacewatch	(5)	1.5 km	MPC · JPL
241452	2008 YL_{111}	—	December 31, 2008	Kitt Peak	Spacewatch	·	1.5 km	MPC · JPL
241453	2008 YO_{111}	—	December 31, 2008	Kitt Peak	Spacewatch	·	2.5 km	MPC · JPL
241454	2008 YA_{112}	—	December 31, 2008	Kitt Peak	Spacewatch	·	1.2 km	MPC · JPL
241455	2008 YD_{115}	—	December 29, 2008	Kitt Peak	Spacewatch	ADE	3.0 km	MPC · JPL
241456	2008 YD_{119}	—	December 29, 2008	Kitt Peak	Spacewatch	·	2.9 km	MPC · JPL
241457	2008 YV_{137}	—	December 30, 2008	Mount Lemmon	Mount Lemmon Survey	·	2.1 km	MPC · JPL
241458	2008 YQ_{142}	—	December 30, 2008	Kitt Peak	Spacewatch	·	3.3 km	MPC · JPL
241459	2008 YX_{150}	—	December 22, 2008	Kitt Peak	Spacewatch	·	3.2 km	MPC · JPL
241460	2008 YH_{151}	—	December 22, 2008	Kitt Peak	Spacewatch	·	1.5 km	MPC · JPL
241461	2008 YQ_{151}	—	December 22, 2008	Mount Lemmon	Mount Lemmon Survey	·	2.6 km	MPC · JPL
241462	2008 YH_{157}	—	December 30, 2008	Kitt Peak	Spacewatch	HOF	3.0 km	MPC · JPL
241463	2008 YQ_{158}	—	December 30, 2008	Mount Lemmon	Mount Lemmon Survey	·	1.6 km	MPC · JPL
241464	2008 YS_{163}	—	December 30, 2008	Mount Lemmon	Mount Lemmon Survey	·	2.5 km	MPC · JPL
241465	2008 YQ_{169}	—	December 30, 2008	Mount Lemmon	Mount Lemmon Survey	·	2.8 km	MPC · JPL
241466	2009 AX_{2}	—	January 1, 2009	Kitt Peak	Spacewatch	·	1.6 km	MPC · JPL
241467	2009 AE_{12}	—	January 2, 2009	Mount Lemmon	Mount Lemmon Survey	·	3.8 km	MPC · JPL
241468	2009 AC_{22}	—	January 3, 2009	Kitt Peak	Spacewatch	·	1.1 km	MPC · JPL
241469	2009 AL_{24}	—	January 3, 2009	Kitt Peak	Spacewatch	·	1.4 km	MPC · JPL
241470	2009 AV_{28}	—	January 8, 2009	Kitt Peak	Spacewatch	·	1.7 km	MPC · JPL
241471	2009 AG_{35}	—	January 15, 2009	Kitt Peak	Spacewatch	·	1.3 km	MPC · JPL
241472	2009 AC_{49}	—	January 15, 2009	Socorro	LINEAR	EOS	3.3 km	MPC · JPL
241473	2009 BK_{11}	—	January 19, 2009	Socorro	LINEAR	·	4.1 km	MPC · JPL
241474	2009 BQ_{12}	—	January 21, 2009	Socorro	LINEAR	MAR	1.8 km	MPC · JPL
241475 Martinagedeck	2009 BK_{14}	Martinagedeck	January 25, 2009	Calar Alto	F. Hormuth	·	3.3 km	MPC · JPL
241476	2009 BD_{18}	—	January 16, 2009	Kitt Peak	Spacewatch	·	1.4 km	MPC · JPL
241477	2009 BH_{36}	—	January 16, 2009	Kitt Peak	Spacewatch	·	3.9 km	MPC · JPL
241478	2009 BJ_{66}	—	January 20, 2009	Kitt Peak	Spacewatch	·	3.3 km	MPC · JPL
241479	2009 BB_{68}	—	January 20, 2009	Kitt Peak	Spacewatch	·	2.6 km	MPC · JPL
241480	2009 BG_{75}	—	January 20, 2009	Catalina	CSS	EOS	2.4 km	MPC · JPL
241481	2009 BM_{83}	—	January 31, 2009	Uccle	T. Pauwels, E. W. Elst	EOS ·	5.9 km	MPC · JPL
241482	2009 BV_{91}	—	January 25, 2009	Kitt Peak	Spacewatch	·	3.4 km	MPC · JPL
241483	2009 BA_{92}	—	January 25, 2009	Kitt Peak	Spacewatch	HOF	3.6 km	MPC · JPL
241484	2009 BC_{92}	—	January 25, 2009	Kitt Peak	Spacewatch	·	2.4 km	MPC · JPL
241485	2009 BE_{95}	—	January 26, 2009	Catalina	CSS	·	3.0 km	MPC · JPL
241486	2009 BP_{98}	—	January 26, 2009	Mount Lemmon	Mount Lemmon Survey	·	1.7 km	MPC · JPL
241487	2009 BP_{99}	—	January 28, 2009	Catalina	CSS	·	3.0 km	MPC · JPL
241488	2009 BB_{119}	—	January 30, 2009	Mount Lemmon	Mount Lemmon Survey	·	1.8 km	MPC · JPL
241489	2009 BV_{125}	—	January 29, 2009	Kitt Peak	Spacewatch	·	3.2 km	MPC · JPL
241490	2009 BQ_{133}	—	January 29, 2009	Kitt Peak	Spacewatch	MRX	1.5 km	MPC · JPL
241491	2009 BT_{141}	—	January 30, 2009	Kitt Peak	Spacewatch	KOR	1.6 km	MPC · JPL
241492	2009 BV_{169}	—	January 17, 2009	Kitt Peak	Spacewatch	TEL	1.8 km	MPC · JPL
241493	2009 BQ_{172}	—	January 18, 2009	Mount Lemmon	Mount Lemmon Survey	KOR	2.0 km	MPC · JPL
241494	2009 BO_{174}	—	January 25, 2009	Kitt Peak	Spacewatch	HYG	3.2 km	MPC · JPL
241495	2009 BD_{184}	—	January 20, 2009	Catalina	CSS	·	3.0 km	MPC · JPL
241496	2009 CZ_{3}	—	February 2, 2009	Moletai	K. Černis, Zdanavicius, J.	·	2.2 km	MPC · JPL
241497	2009 CC_{4}	—	February 7, 2009	Great Shefford	Birtwhistle, P.	·	2.5 km	MPC · JPL
241498	2009 CV_{22}	—	February 1, 2009	Kitt Peak	Spacewatch	·	2.6 km	MPC · JPL
241499	2009 CD_{24}	—	February 1, 2009	Kitt Peak	Spacewatch	EOS	2.5 km	MPC · JPL
241500	2009 CK_{28}	—	February 1, 2009	Kitt Peak	Spacewatch	·	1.4 km	MPC · JPL

== 241501–241600 ==
back to top

Designation			Discovery			Properties		Ref
Permanent	Provisional	Named after	Date	Site	Discoverer(s)	Category	Diam.	Ref
241501	2009 CL_{33}	—	February 1, 2009	Kitt Peak	Spacewatch	·	5.4 km	MPC · JPL
241502	2009 CY_{41}	—	February 13, 2009	Kitt Peak	Spacewatch	KOR	1.8 km	MPC · JPL
241503	2009 CN_{42}	—	February 13, 2009	Mount Lemmon	Mount Lemmon Survey	EOS	4.7 km	MPC · JPL
241504	2009 CD_{44}	—	February 14, 2009	Kitt Peak	Spacewatch	SYL · CYB	6.6 km	MPC · JPL
241505	2009 CJ_{49}	—	February 14, 2009	Mount Lemmon	Mount Lemmon Survey	·	3.0 km	MPC · JPL
241506	2009 CU_{53}	—	February 3, 2009	Siding Spring	SSS	EUP	5.6 km	MPC · JPL
241507	2009 CM_{60}	—	February 3, 2009	Kitt Peak	Spacewatch	·	3.9 km	MPC · JPL
241508	2009 DJ_{16}	—	February 17, 2009	La Sagra	OAM	KOR	1.8 km	MPC · JPL
241509 Sessler	2009 DT_{26}	Sessler	February 22, 2009	Calar Alto	F. Hormuth	·	2.8 km	MPC · JPL
241510	2009 DQ_{39}	—	February 19, 2009	Dauban	Kugel, F.	·	3.6 km	MPC · JPL
241511	2009 DK_{41}	—	February 18, 2009	La Sagra	OAM	·	5.1 km	MPC · JPL
241512	2009 DN_{44}	—	February 25, 2009	Dauban	Kugel, F.	·	4.1 km	MPC · JPL
241513	2009 DG_{48}	—	February 28, 2009	Calvin-Rehoboth	Calvin College	·	4.2 km	MPC · JPL
241514	2009 DX_{69}	—	February 26, 2009	Catalina	CSS	NAE	4.9 km	MPC · JPL
241515	2009 DU_{89}	—	February 26, 2009	Mount Lemmon	Mount Lemmon Survey	WIT	1.3 km	MPC · JPL
241516	2009 DD_{140}	—	February 19, 2009	Socorro	LINEAR	·	4.4 km	MPC · JPL
241517	2009 EK	—	March 1, 2009	Great Shefford	Birtwhistle, P.	·	5.2 km	MPC · JPL
241518	2009 EV_{12}	—	March 3, 2009	Catalina	CSS	·	5.2 km	MPC · JPL
241519	2009 FY_{8}	—	March 16, 2009	Mount Lemmon	Mount Lemmon Survey	·	4.2 km	MPC · JPL
241520	2009 FR_{47}	—	March 29, 2009	Las Cruces	Dixon, D. S.	URS	5.1 km	MPC · JPL
241521	2009 HL_{2}	—	April 17, 2009	Kitt Peak	Spacewatch	·	5.2 km	MPC · JPL
241522	2009 HN_{3}	—	April 17, 2009	Kitt Peak	Spacewatch	·	1.9 km	MPC · JPL
241523	2009 HE_{11}	—	April 18, 2009	Mount Lemmon	Mount Lemmon Survey	·	3.2 km	MPC · JPL
241524	2009 HR_{24}	—	April 17, 2009	Kitt Peak	Spacewatch	·	3.7 km	MPC · JPL
241525	2009 RN_{7}	—	September 11, 2009	Catalina	CSS	·	750 m	MPC · JPL
241526	2009 XA_{15}	—	December 15, 2009	Mount Lemmon	Mount Lemmon Survey	·	3.6 km	MPC · JPL
241527 Edwardwright	2010 CK_{9}	Edwardwright	February 8, 2010	WISE	WISE	·	2.9 km	MPC · JPL
241528 Tubman	2010 CA_{10}	Tubman	February 8, 2010	WISE	WISE	3:2 · SHU	7.1 km	MPC · JPL
241529 Roccutri	2010 CA_{14}	Roccutri	February 10, 2010	WISE	WISE	·	4.5 km	MPC · JPL
241530	2010 CC_{77}	—	February 13, 2010	Mount Lemmon	Mount Lemmon Survey	·	2.2 km	MPC · JPL
241531	2010 CL_{177}	—	February 10, 2010	Kitt Peak	Spacewatch	·	3.2 km	MPC · JPL
241532	2010 DV_{7}	—	February 16, 2010	Kitt Peak	Spacewatch	·	900 m	MPC · JPL
241533	2010 DA_{34}	—	February 21, 2010	Bisei SG Center	BATTeRS	·	3.7 km	MPC · JPL
241534	2010 EE_{36}	—	March 11, 2010	La Sagra	OAM	·	5.3 km	MPC · JPL
241535	2010 EG_{38}	—	March 12, 2010	Mount Lemmon	Mount Lemmon Survey	·	840 m	MPC · JPL
241536	2010 EX_{39}	—	March 11, 2010	La Sagra	OAM	T_{j} (2.99) · EUP	5.1 km	MPC · JPL
241537	2010 EE_{42}	—	March 12, 2010	Mount Lemmon	Mount Lemmon Survey	·	1.2 km	MPC · JPL
241538 Chudniv	2010 EV_{42}	Chudniv	March 10, 2010	Andrushivka	Andrushivka	·	3.3 km	MPC · JPL
241539	2010 EB_{71}	—	March 12, 2010	Kitt Peak	Spacewatch	KON	2.4 km	MPC · JPL
241540	2010 EC_{88}	—	March 14, 2010	La Sagra	OAM	PHO	980 m	MPC · JPL
241541	2010 ET_{101}	—	March 15, 2010	Kitt Peak	Spacewatch	THM	2.9 km	MPC · JPL
241542	2010 EJ_{102}	—	March 15, 2010	Kitt Peak	Spacewatch	·	3.9 km	MPC · JPL
241543	2010 EH_{127}	—	March 15, 2010	Mount Lemmon	Mount Lemmon Survey	·	1.8 km	MPC · JPL
241544	2010 EE_{128}	—	March 12, 2010	Kitt Peak	Spacewatch	·	2.7 km	MPC · JPL
241545	2010 EE_{129}	—	March 12, 2010	Kitt Peak	Spacewatch	·	2.6 km	MPC · JPL
241546	2010 EV_{129}	—	March 13, 2010	Kitt Peak	Spacewatch	·	3.0 km	MPC · JPL
241547	2010 FF_{13}	—	March 16, 2010	Kitt Peak	Spacewatch	·	2.2 km	MPC · JPL
241548	2010 FF_{15}	—	March 17, 2010	Kitt Peak	Spacewatch	·	2.2 km	MPC · JPL
241549	2010 FS_{29}	—	March 16, 2010	Kitt Peak	Spacewatch	·	920 m	MPC · JPL
241550	2010 FD_{57}	—	March 16, 2010	Mount Lemmon	Mount Lemmon Survey	·	840 m	MPC · JPL
241551	2010 FJ_{83}	—	March 19, 2010	Mount Lemmon	Mount Lemmon Survey	·	2.3 km	MPC · JPL
241552	2010 FK_{83}	—	March 19, 2010	Mount Lemmon	Mount Lemmon Survey	PHO	7.0 km	MPC · JPL
241553	2010 FT_{88}	—	March 18, 2010	Kitt Peak	Spacewatch	·	960 m	MPC · JPL
241554	2010 FA_{93}	—	March 23, 2010	ESA OGS	ESA OGS	·	4.6 km	MPC · JPL
241555	2010 GT_{5}	—	April 3, 2010	Mayhill	Mayhill	·	3.0 km	MPC · JPL
241556	2010 GT_{29}	—	April 8, 2010	La Sagra	OAM	·	3.0 km	MPC · JPL
241557	2010 GL_{31}	—	April 5, 2010	Kitt Peak	Spacewatch	(2076)	730 m	MPC · JPL
241558	2010 GN_{33}	—	April 9, 2010	Zvezdno Obshtestvo	Fratev, F.	EOS	2.4 km	MPC · JPL
241559	2010 GY_{64}	—	April 6, 2010	Catalina	CSS	·	1.8 km	MPC · JPL
241560	5002 T-2	—	September 25, 1973	Palomar	C. J. van Houten, I. van Houten-Groeneveld, T. Gehrels	·	4.2 km	MPC · JPL
241561	2397 T-3	—	October 16, 1977	Palomar	C. J. van Houten, I. van Houten-Groeneveld, T. Gehrels	·	2.6 km	MPC · JPL
241562	4192 T-3	—	October 16, 1977	Palomar	C. J. van Houten, I. van Houten-Groeneveld, T. Gehrels	·	2.2 km	MPC · JPL
241563	1981 EZ_{5}	—	March 7, 1981	Siding Spring	S. J. Bus	HIL · 3:2	6.8 km	MPC · JPL
241564	1981 ET_{11}	—	March 7, 1981	Siding Spring	S. J. Bus	·	3.1 km	MPC · JPL
241565	1981 EU_{45}	—	March 1, 1981	Siding Spring	S. J. Bus	·	4.1 km	MPC · JPL
241566	1993 FO_{9}	—	March 17, 1993	La Silla	UESAC	·	2.9 km	MPC · JPL
241567	1993 OJ_{9}	—	July 20, 1993	La Silla	E. W. Elst	·	2.4 km	MPC · JPL
241568	1993 RN_{14}	—	September 15, 1993	La Silla	E. W. Elst	·	4.2 km	MPC · JPL
241569	1995 CZ_{3}	—	February 1, 1995	Kitt Peak	Spacewatch	·	1.7 km	MPC · JPL
241570	1995 FK_{9}	—	March 26, 1995	Kitt Peak	Spacewatch	·	4.8 km	MPC · JPL
241571	1995 MJ_{2}	—	June 24, 1995	Kitt Peak	Spacewatch	·	3.1 km	MPC · JPL
241572	1995 OM_{13}	—	July 22, 1995	Kitt Peak	Spacewatch	EOS	2.6 km	MPC · JPL
241573	1995 QE_{9}	—	August 28, 1995	Kitt Peak	Spacewatch	L4	14 km	MPC · JPL
241574	1995 SH_{17}	—	September 18, 1995	Kitt Peak	Spacewatch	·	2.1 km	MPC · JPL
241575	1995 SH_{21}	—	September 19, 1995	Kitt Peak	Spacewatch	TRE	4.1 km	MPC · JPL
241576	1995 SE_{31}	—	September 20, 1995	Kitt Peak	Spacewatch	L4	12 km	MPC · JPL
241577	1995 SK_{31}	—	September 21, 1995	Kitt Peak	Spacewatch	·	4.6 km	MPC · JPL
241578	1995 SH_{50}	—	September 26, 1995	Kitt Peak	Spacewatch	·	5.3 km	MPC · JPL
241579	1995 UX_{40}	—	October 23, 1995	Kitt Peak	Spacewatch	·	1.4 km	MPC · JPL
241580	1995 YN_{12}	—	December 19, 1995	Kitt Peak	Spacewatch	H	900 m	MPC · JPL
241581	1996 RF_{14}	—	September 8, 1996	Kitt Peak	Spacewatch	L4	12 km	MPC · JPL
241582	1996 RY_{30}	—	September 13, 1996	La Silla	Uppsala-DLR Trojan Survey	L4	13 km	MPC · JPL
241583	1996 UV_{3}	—	October 31, 1996	Stroncone	A. Vagnozzi	·	1.4 km	MPC · JPL
241584	1997 CD_{18}	—	February 7, 1997	Kitt Peak	Spacewatch	KON	4.2 km	MPC · JPL
241585	1997 JS_{2}	—	May 2, 1997	Mauna Kea	Veillet, C.	·	4.4 km	MPC · JPL
241586	1997 LT_{1}	—	June 2, 1997	Kitt Peak	Spacewatch	·	2.0 km	MPC · JPL
241587	1997 NE_{2}	—	July 3, 1997	Kitt Peak	Spacewatch	·	3.7 km	MPC · JPL
241588	1997 RK_{1}	—	September 1, 1997	Prescott	P. G. Comba	·	840 m	MPC · JPL
241589	1997 SG_{14}	—	September 28, 1997	Kitt Peak	Spacewatch	L4	11 km	MPC · JPL
241590	1998 BM_{4}	—	January 23, 1998	Modra	A. Galád	·	5.0 km	MPC · JPL
241591	1998 FY_{24}	—	March 20, 1998	Socorro	LINEAR	·	3.5 km	MPC · JPL
241592	1998 KV	—	May 21, 1998	Kuma Kogen	A. Nakamura	·	4.5 km	MPC · JPL
241593	1998 KW_{42}	—	May 28, 1998	Kitt Peak	Spacewatch	·	6.4 km	MPC · JPL
241594	1998 TY	—	October 12, 1998	Kitt Peak	Spacewatch	·	5.4 km	MPC · JPL
241595	1998 WJ_{39}	—	November 21, 1998	Kitt Peak	Spacewatch	THM	2.6 km	MPC · JPL
241596	1998 XM_{2}	—	December 9, 1998	Socorro	LINEAR	AMO +1km	1.5 km	MPC · JPL
241597	1998 YD_{16}	—	December 22, 1998	Kitt Peak	Spacewatch	·	2.5 km	MPC · JPL
241598	1999 GV_{28}	—	April 7, 1999	Socorro	LINEAR	·	2.5 km	MPC · JPL
241599	1999 JA_{15}	—	May 12, 1999	Socorro	LINEAR	·	3.5 km	MPC · JPL
241600	1999 JV_{39}	—	May 10, 1999	Socorro	LINEAR	·	1.9 km	MPC · JPL

== 241601–241700 ==
back to top

Designation			Discovery			Properties		Ref
Permanent	Provisional	Named after	Date	Site	Discoverer(s)	Category	Diam.	Ref
241601	1999 NZ_{34}	—	July 14, 1999	Socorro	LINEAR	H	1.4 km	MPC · JPL
241602	1999 RZ_{61}	—	September 7, 1999	Socorro	LINEAR	·	1.8 km	MPC · JPL
241603	1999 RC_{110}	—	September 8, 1999	Socorro	LINEAR	ADE	4.1 km	MPC · JPL
241604	1999 RD_{133}	—	September 9, 1999	Socorro	LINEAR	·	2.5 km	MPC · JPL
241605	1999 RF_{140}	—	September 9, 1999	Socorro	LINEAR	·	2.2 km	MPC · JPL
241606	1999 RX_{199}	—	September 8, 1999	Socorro	LINEAR	·	5.2 km	MPC · JPL
241607	1999 RJ_{201}	—	September 8, 1999	Socorro	LINEAR	ADE	3.9 km	MPC · JPL
241608	1999 RA_{224}	—	September 7, 1999	Catalina	CSS	·	2.8 km	MPC · JPL
241609	1999 RZ_{237}	—	September 8, 1999	Catalina	CSS	T_{j} (2.94)	5.0 km	MPC · JPL
241610	1999 SZ_{13}	—	September 29, 1999	Catalina	CSS	·	2.2 km	MPC · JPL
241611	1999 TO_{10}	—	October 8, 1999	San Marcello	A. Boattini, L. Tesi	·	1.5 km	MPC · JPL
241612	1999 TN_{35}	—	October 4, 1999	Socorro	LINEAR	·	2.8 km	MPC · JPL
241613	1999 TT_{135}	—	October 6, 1999	Socorro	LINEAR	·	2.5 km	MPC · JPL
241614	1999 TT_{146}	—	October 7, 1999	Socorro	LINEAR	·	1.6 km	MPC · JPL
241615	1999 TB_{227}	—	October 4, 1999	Kitt Peak	Spacewatch	·	1.3 km	MPC · JPL
241616	1999 TC_{239}	—	October 4, 1999	Socorro	LINEAR	·	5.9 km	MPC · JPL
241617	1999 TV_{266}	—	October 3, 1999	Socorro	LINEAR	EUN ·	5.3 km	MPC · JPL
241618	1999 TY_{271}	—	October 3, 1999	Socorro	LINEAR	LIX	5.3 km	MPC · JPL
241619	1999 UU_{9}	—	October 31, 1999	Socorro	LINEAR	·	1.5 km	MPC · JPL
241620	1999 UQ_{26}	—	October 30, 1999	Catalina	CSS	·	5.1 km	MPC · JPL
241621	1999 UR_{52}	—	October 31, 1999	Catalina	CSS	·	3.1 km	MPC · JPL
241622	1999 VL_{5}	—	November 6, 1999	Fountain Hills	C. W. Juels	·	3.6 km	MPC · JPL
241623	1999 VT_{19}	—	November 11, 1999	Everstar	Everstar	·	3.9 km	MPC · JPL
241624	1999 VU_{52}	—	November 3, 1999	Socorro	LINEAR	·	5.9 km	MPC · JPL
241625	1999 VE_{63}	—	November 4, 1999	Socorro	LINEAR	·	2.6 km	MPC · JPL
241626	1999 VC_{128}	—	November 9, 1999	Kitt Peak	Spacewatch	·	2.1 km	MPC · JPL
241627	1999 VV_{162}	—	November 14, 1999	Socorro	LINEAR	·	2.3 km	MPC · JPL
241628	1999 VM_{164}	—	November 14, 1999	Socorro	LINEAR	·	2.2 km	MPC · JPL
241629	1999 VC_{173}	—	November 15, 1999	Socorro	LINEAR	PHO	2.8 km	MPC · JPL
241630	1999 VY_{174}	—	November 4, 1999	Kitt Peak	Spacewatch	THM	2.7 km	MPC · JPL
241631	1999 VJ_{182}	—	November 9, 1999	Socorro	LINEAR	NYS	1.3 km	MPC · JPL
241632	1999 VV_{188}	—	November 15, 1999	Socorro	LINEAR	·	2.2 km	MPC · JPL
241633	1999 VL_{202}	—	November 5, 1999	Kitt Peak	Spacewatch	(5)	2.9 km	MPC · JPL
241634	1999 WA_{17}	—	November 30, 1999	Kitt Peak	Spacewatch	·	5.2 km	MPC · JPL
241635	1999 XQ	—	December 2, 1999	Kitt Peak	Spacewatch	·	5.4 km	MPC · JPL
241636	1999 XR_{46}	—	December 7, 1999	Socorro	LINEAR	·	1.8 km	MPC · JPL
241637	1999 XO_{114}	—	December 11, 1999	Socorro	LINEAR	·	2.8 km	MPC · JPL
241638	1999 XO_{153}	—	December 7, 1999	Socorro	LINEAR	·	5.5 km	MPC · JPL
241639	1999 XX_{217}	—	December 13, 1999	Kitt Peak	Spacewatch	·	2.1 km	MPC · JPL
241640	1999 XS_{249}	—	December 6, 1999	Socorro	LINEAR	EUN	3.8 km	MPC · JPL
241641	1999 XX_{250}	—	December 5, 1999	Kitt Peak	Spacewatch	·	5.4 km	MPC · JPL
241642	2000 AH_{145}	—	January 6, 2000	Socorro	LINEAR	·	3.4 km	MPC · JPL
241643	2000 AJ_{206}	—	January 3, 2000	Kitt Peak	Spacewatch	L4	16 km	MPC · JPL
241644	2000 AN_{208}	—	January 4, 2000	Kitt Peak	Spacewatch	·	3.0 km	MPC · JPL
241645	2000 DP_{14}	—	February 25, 2000	Catalina	CSS	·	3.6 km	MPC · JPL
241646	2000 DA_{72}	—	February 29, 2000	Socorro	LINEAR	·	2.6 km	MPC · JPL
241647	2000 EL	—	March 2, 2000	Prescott	P. G. Comba	·	1.7 km	MPC · JPL
241648	2000 EN_{11}	—	March 4, 2000	Socorro	LINEAR	·	9.3 km	MPC · JPL
241649	2000 EC_{140}	—	March 9, 2000	Socorro	LINEAR	·	1.3 km	MPC · JPL
241650	2000 GO_{3}	—	April 5, 2000	Socorro	LINEAR	H	980 m	MPC · JPL
241651	2000 GT_{152}	—	April 6, 2000	Anderson Mesa	LONEOS	·	2.1 km	MPC · JPL
241652	2000 GZ_{175}	—	April 2, 2000	Kitt Peak	Spacewatch	GEF	1.5 km	MPC · JPL
241653	2000 HT_{6}	—	April 24, 2000	Kitt Peak	Spacewatch	·	1.6 km	MPC · JPL
241654	2000 HN_{22}	—	April 29, 2000	Socorro	LINEAR	·	1.1 km	MPC · JPL
241655	2000 HL_{99}	—	April 26, 2000	Anderson Mesa	LONEOS	fast	3.4 km	MPC · JPL
241656	2000 JM_{3}	—	May 3, 2000	Socorro	LINEAR	PHO	1.5 km	MPC · JPL
241657	2000 JC_{7}	—	May 6, 2000	Ondřejov	P. Pravec, P. Kušnirák	·	3.7 km	MPC · JPL
241658	2000 JR_{10}	—	May 9, 2000	Socorro	LINEAR	PHO	1.8 km	MPC · JPL
241659	2000 JS_{40}	—	May 5, 2000	Socorro	LINEAR	·	3.5 km	MPC · JPL
241660	2000 JC_{46}	—	May 7, 2000	Socorro	LINEAR	·	2.8 km	MPC · JPL
241661	2000 JA_{72}	—	May 1, 2000	Anderson Mesa	LONEOS	·	860 m	MPC · JPL
241662	2000 KO_{44}	—	May 30, 2000	Socorro	LINEAR	AMO +1km	900 m	MPC · JPL
241663	2000 LJ_{4}	—	June 4, 2000	Socorro	LINEAR	·	5.4 km	MPC · JPL
241664	2000 ON_{8}	—	July 23, 2000	Socorro	LINEAR	·	2.7 km	MPC · JPL
241665	2000 OO_{26}	—	July 23, 2000	Socorro	LINEAR	·	2.8 km	MPC · JPL
241666	2000 OE_{38}	—	July 30, 2000	Socorro	LINEAR	·	1.3 km	MPC · JPL
241667	2000 OG_{39}	—	July 30, 2000	Socorro	LINEAR	·	2.3 km	MPC · JPL
241668	2000 OQ_{58}	—	July 29, 2000	Anderson Mesa	LONEOS	·	1.8 km	MPC · JPL
241669	2000 OS_{68}	—	July 29, 2000	Anderson Mesa	LONEOS	·	2.0 km	MPC · JPL
241670	2000 PH_{12}	—	August 2, 2000	Socorro	LINEAR	EUN	1.8 km	MPC · JPL
241671	2000 QZ_{21}	—	August 24, 2000	Socorro	LINEAR	MIS	2.6 km	MPC · JPL
241672	2000 QT_{62}	—	August 28, 2000	Socorro	LINEAR	·	910 m	MPC · JPL
241673	2000 QG_{70}	—	August 26, 2000	Socorro	LINEAR	·	2.4 km	MPC · JPL
241674	2000 QA_{77}	—	August 24, 2000	Socorro	LINEAR	·	4.2 km	MPC · JPL
241675	2000 QE_{77}	—	August 24, 2000	Socorro	LINEAR	·	2.1 km	MPC · JPL
241676	2000 QW_{158}	—	August 31, 2000	Socorro	LINEAR	·	1.2 km	MPC · JPL
241677	2000 QG_{161}	—	August 31, 2000	Socorro	LINEAR	·	6.0 km	MPC · JPL
241678	2000 QW_{169}	—	August 31, 2000	Socorro	LINEAR	·	1.3 km	MPC · JPL
241679	2000 QF_{186}	—	August 26, 2000	Socorro	LINEAR	ADE	3.7 km	MPC · JPL
241680	2000 QZ_{210}	—	August 31, 2000	Socorro	LINEAR	·	910 m	MPC · JPL
241681	2000 RX_{8}	—	September 1, 2000	River Oaks	Holliday, W.	·	5.5 km	MPC · JPL
241682	2000 RD_{21}	—	September 1, 2000	Socorro	LINEAR	·	1.9 km	MPC · JPL
241683	2000 RP_{79}	—	September 1, 2000	Socorro	LINEAR	TIR	3.9 km	MPC · JPL
241684	2000 RV_{86}	—	September 2, 2000	Anderson Mesa	LONEOS	·	5.3 km	MPC · JPL
241685	2000 RW_{87}	—	September 2, 2000	Anderson Mesa	LONEOS	·	2.7 km	MPC · JPL
241686	2000 RV_{98}	—	September 5, 2000	Anderson Mesa	LONEOS	·	3.4 km	MPC · JPL
241687	2000 SZ_{16}	—	September 23, 2000	Socorro	LINEAR	EOS	2.9 km	MPC · JPL
241688	2000 SF_{26}	—	September 23, 2000	Socorro	LINEAR	·	4.5 km	MPC · JPL
241689	2000 SO_{50}	—	September 23, 2000	Socorro	LINEAR	·	2.7 km	MPC · JPL
241690	2000 SK_{53}	—	September 24, 2000	Socorro	LINEAR	·	880 m	MPC · JPL
241691	2000 SP_{70}	—	September 24, 2000	Socorro	LINEAR	·	2.5 km	MPC · JPL
241692	2000 SP_{97}	—	September 23, 2000	Socorro	LINEAR	·	2.9 km	MPC · JPL
241693	2000 SK_{99}	—	September 23, 2000	Socorro	LINEAR	V	920 m	MPC · JPL
241694	2000 SU_{105}	—	September 24, 2000	Socorro	LINEAR	·	4.3 km	MPC · JPL
241695	2000 SL_{136}	—	September 23, 2000	Socorro	LINEAR	·	4.1 km	MPC · JPL
241696	2000 SD_{139}	—	September 23, 2000	Socorro	LINEAR	·	1.6 km	MPC · JPL
241697	2000 SG_{139}	—	September 23, 2000	Socorro	LINEAR	·	1.3 km	MPC · JPL
241698	2000 SK_{166}	—	September 23, 2000	Socorro	LINEAR	EOS	3.1 km	MPC · JPL
241699	2000 SO_{168}	—	September 23, 2000	Socorro	LINEAR	·	1.8 km	MPC · JPL
241700	2000 SV_{175}	—	September 28, 2000	Socorro	LINEAR	·	2.1 km	MPC · JPL

== 241701–241800 ==
back to top

Designation			Discovery			Properties		Ref
Permanent	Provisional	Named after	Date	Site	Discoverer(s)	Category	Diam.	Ref
241701	2000 SK_{191}	—	September 24, 2000	Socorro	LINEAR	·	1.4 km	MPC · JPL
241702	2000 SQ_{231}	—	September 24, 2000	Socorro	LINEAR	·	4.0 km	MPC · JPL
241703	2000 ST_{267}	—	September 27, 2000	Socorro	LINEAR	·	1.9 km	MPC · JPL
241704	2000 SD_{270}	—	September 27, 2000	Socorro	LINEAR	·	3.4 km	MPC · JPL
241705	2000 SA_{305}	—	September 30, 2000	Socorro	LINEAR	·	1.6 km	MPC · JPL
241706	2000 SK_{340}	—	September 24, 2000	Socorro	LINEAR	TIR ·	5.4 km	MPC · JPL
241707	2000 SS_{348}	—	September 30, 2000	Anderson Mesa	LONEOS	EOS	3.1 km	MPC · JPL
241708	2000 SD_{352}	—	September 30, 2000	Anderson Mesa	LONEOS	·	7.1 km	MPC · JPL
241709	2000 SQ_{360}	—	September 26, 2000	Haleakala	NEAT	JUN	1.7 km	MPC · JPL
241710	2000 SF_{367}	—	September 21, 2000	Kitt Peak	Spacewatch	CYB	6.5 km	MPC · JPL
241711	2000 TD	—	October 1, 2000	Prescott	P. G. Comba	·	1.8 km	MPC · JPL
241712	2000 TP_{2}	—	October 1, 2000	Socorro	LINEAR	·	5.6 km	MPC · JPL
241713	2000 TJ_{22}	—	October 3, 2000	Socorro	LINEAR	·	2.4 km	MPC · JPL
241714	2000 TX_{27}	—	October 3, 2000	Socorro	LINEAR	·	3.2 km	MPC · JPL
241715	2000 TP_{63}	—	October 3, 2000	Socorro	LINEAR	·	3.0 km	MPC · JPL
241716	2000 UO_{10}	—	October 24, 2000	Socorro	LINEAR	ERI	2.4 km	MPC · JPL
241717	2000 UM_{26}	—	October 24, 2000	Socorro	LINEAR	·	3.3 km	MPC · JPL
241718	2000 UC_{35}	—	October 24, 2000	Socorro	LINEAR	·	1.6 km	MPC · JPL
241719	2000 UN_{41}	—	October 24, 2000	Socorro	LINEAR	·	5.5 km	MPC · JPL
241720	2000 UZ_{43}	—	October 24, 2000	Socorro	LINEAR	·	3.9 km	MPC · JPL
241721	2000 UF_{53}	—	October 24, 2000	Socorro	LINEAR	·	4.9 km	MPC · JPL
241722	2000 UA_{75}	—	October 31, 2000	Socorro	LINEAR	·	4.9 km	MPC · JPL
241723	2000 UL_{92}	—	October 25, 2000	Socorro	LINEAR	·	1.8 km	MPC · JPL
241724	2000 UU_{114}	—	October 25, 2000	Socorro	LINEAR	·	4.7 km	MPC · JPL
241725	2000 VM	—	November 1, 2000	Kitt Peak	Spacewatch	·	3.6 km	MPC · JPL
241726	2000 VE_{7}	—	November 1, 2000	Socorro	LINEAR	V	1.1 km	MPC · JPL
241727	2000 VS_{24}	—	November 1, 2000	Socorro	LINEAR	V	720 m	MPC · JPL
241728	2000 VL_{35}	—	November 1, 2000	Socorro	LINEAR	·	1.4 km	MPC · JPL
241729	2000 VG_{42}	—	November 1, 2000	Socorro	LINEAR	·	4.0 km	MPC · JPL
241730	2000 VE_{50}	—	November 2, 2000	Socorro	LINEAR	·	7.5 km	MPC · JPL
241731	2000 VL_{58}	—	November 2, 2000	Socorro	LINEAR	AEG · fast	5.5 km	MPC · JPL
241732	2000 WG_{2}	—	November 17, 2000	Socorro	LINEAR	·	3.9 km	MPC · JPL
241733	2000 WN_{93}	—	November 21, 2000	Socorro	LINEAR	·	3.2 km	MPC · JPL
241734	2000 WV_{93}	—	November 21, 2000	Socorro	LINEAR	·	3.3 km	MPC · JPL
241735	2000 WS_{131}	—	November 20, 2000	Anderson Mesa	LONEOS	·	2.6 km	MPC · JPL
241736	2000 WC_{136}	—	November 20, 2000	Socorro	LINEAR	·	1.6 km	MPC · JPL
241737	2000 WD_{141}	—	November 19, 2000	Socorro	LINEAR	T_{j} (2.9)	7.4 km	MPC · JPL
241738	2000 WM_{188}	—	November 18, 2000	Anderson Mesa	LONEOS	EOS	3.6 km	MPC · JPL
241739	2000 XR_{8}	—	December 1, 2000	Socorro	LINEAR	·	6.2 km	MPC · JPL
241740	2000 XF_{22}	—	December 4, 2000	Socorro	LINEAR	·	3.7 km	MPC · JPL
241741	2000 XK_{36}	—	December 5, 2000	Socorro	LINEAR	·	3.5 km	MPC · JPL
241742	2000 YD_{11}	—	December 22, 2000	Socorro	LINEAR	·	2.0 km	MPC · JPL
241743	2000 YB_{46}	—	December 30, 2000	Socorro	LINEAR	(22805)	5.9 km	MPC · JPL
241744	2000 YR_{64}	—	December 27, 2000	Kitt Peak	Spacewatch	·	1.4 km	MPC · JPL
241745	2000 YX_{71}	—	December 30, 2000	Socorro	LINEAR	·	4.2 km	MPC · JPL
241746	2000 YY_{84}	—	December 30, 2000	Socorro	LINEAR	·	1.7 km	MPC · JPL
241747	2001 AB_{27}	—	January 5, 2001	Socorro	LINEAR	·	5.8 km	MPC · JPL
241748	2001 AB_{30}	—	January 4, 2001	Socorro	LINEAR	TIR	3.4 km	MPC · JPL
241749	2001 AA_{41}	—	January 3, 2001	Anderson Mesa	LONEOS	(5)	3.2 km	MPC · JPL
241750	2001 BV_{8}	—	January 19, 2001	Socorro	LINEAR	·	3.7 km	MPC · JPL
241751	2001 BD_{11}	—	January 16, 2001	Haleakala	NEAT	·	4.9 km	MPC · JPL
241752	2001 BD_{40}	—	January 21, 2001	Socorro	LINEAR	PHO	3.2 km	MPC · JPL
241753	2001 BC_{43}	—	January 19, 2001	Socorro	LINEAR	·	2.3 km	MPC · JPL
241754	2001 CA_{1}	—	February 1, 2001	Socorro	LINEAR	L4	14 km	MPC · JPL
241755	2001 CB_{34}	—	February 13, 2001	Socorro	LINEAR	·	2.3 km	MPC · JPL
241756	2001 DD_{18}	—	February 16, 2001	Socorro	LINEAR	·	4.1 km	MPC · JPL
241757	2001 DO_{27}	—	February 17, 2001	Socorro	LINEAR	·	1.8 km	MPC · JPL
241758	2001 DD_{31}	—	February 17, 2001	Socorro	LINEAR	·	1.5 km	MPC · JPL
241759	2001 DT_{35}	—	February 19, 2001	Socorro	LINEAR	LUT	6.2 km	MPC · JPL
241760	2001 DO_{62}	—	February 19, 2001	Socorro	LINEAR	·	1.8 km	MPC · JPL
241761	2001 DP_{79}	—	February 20, 2001	Haleakala	NEAT	·	2.2 km	MPC · JPL
241762	2001 DJ_{102}	—	February 16, 2001	Socorro	LINEAR	·	1.7 km	MPC · JPL
241763	2001 FG_{58}	—	March 19, 2001	Socorro	LINEAR	·	2.5 km	MPC · JPL
241764	2001 FR_{67}	—	March 19, 2001	Socorro	LINEAR	·	2.4 km	MPC · JPL
241765	2001 FG_{97}	—	March 16, 2001	Socorro	LINEAR	(5)	2.4 km	MPC · JPL
241766	2001 FQ_{101}	—	March 17, 2001	Socorro	LINEAR	EUN	1.7 km	MPC · JPL
241767	2001 FL_{123}	—	March 23, 2001	Anderson Mesa	LONEOS	·	5.7 km	MPC · JPL
241768	2001 FP_{171}	—	March 24, 2001	Haleakala	NEAT	EUN	2.0 km	MPC · JPL
241769	2001 FW_{171}	—	March 24, 2001	Haleakala	NEAT	·	2.6 km	MPC · JPL
241770	2001 FA_{180}	—	March 20, 2001	Anderson Mesa	LONEOS	·	2.4 km	MPC · JPL
241771	2001 HD_{3}	—	April 17, 2001	Socorro	LINEAR	·	2.5 km	MPC · JPL
241772	2001 HD_{40}	—	April 30, 2001	Kitt Peak	Spacewatch	·	2.3 km	MPC · JPL
241773	2001 JA_{2}	—	May 15, 2001	Kitt Peak	Spacewatch	·	3.2 km	MPC · JPL
241774	2001 KD	—	May 16, 2001	Socorro	LINEAR	·	3.7 km	MPC · JPL
241775	2001 KE_{51}	—	May 24, 2001	Socorro	LINEAR	·	3.8 km	MPC · JPL
241776	2001 MM_{6}	—	June 21, 2001	Palomar	NEAT	·	3.3 km	MPC · JPL
241777	2001 NC_{9}	—	July 13, 2001	Palomar	NEAT	·	3.4 km	MPC · JPL
241778	2001 NV_{14}	—	July 13, 2001	Palomar	NEAT	EOS	3.8 km	MPC · JPL
241779	2001 NG_{15}	—	July 13, 2001	Palomar	NEAT	·	5.9 km	MPC · JPL
241780	2001 OK	—	July 17, 2001	Badlands	Badlands	·	1.8 km	MPC · JPL
241781	2001 OJ_{21}	—	July 21, 2001	Anderson Mesa	LONEOS	·	1.6 km	MPC · JPL
241782	2001 OG_{31}	—	July 19, 2001	Palomar	NEAT	·	3.8 km	MPC · JPL
241783	2001 OX_{87}	—	July 31, 2001	Palomar	NEAT	·	5.6 km	MPC · JPL
241784	2001 OU_{90}	—	July 25, 2001	Haleakala	NEAT	·	4.3 km	MPC · JPL
241785	2001 OJ_{103}	—	July 29, 2001	Socorro	LINEAR	EUN	2.3 km	MPC · JPL
241786	2001 PR_{5}	—	August 10, 2001	Palomar	NEAT	·	1.7 km	MPC · JPL
241787	2001 PE_{13}	—	August 12, 2001	Ondřejov	P. Kušnirák	·	6.8 km	MPC · JPL
241788	2001 PS_{34}	—	August 10, 2001	Palomar	NEAT	·	3.4 km	MPC · JPL
241789	2001 PP_{35}	—	August 11, 2001	Palomar	NEAT	T_{j} (2.94)	6.9 km	MPC · JPL
241790	2001 PN_{40}	—	August 11, 2001	Palomar	NEAT	LIX	9.1 km	MPC · JPL
241791	2001 PB_{51}	—	August 15, 2001	Bergisch Gladbach	W. Bickel	·	2.9 km	MPC · JPL
241792	2001 PN_{58}	—	August 14, 2001	Haleakala	NEAT	EUN	2.1 km	MPC · JPL
241793	2001 QG_{6}	—	August 16, 2001	Socorro	LINEAR	·	1.9 km	MPC · JPL
241794	2001 QK_{61}	—	August 16, 2001	Socorro	LINEAR	·	5.2 km	MPC · JPL
241795	2001 QQ_{110}	—	August 24, 2001	Ondřejov	P. Kušnirák	KOR	1.9 km	MPC · JPL
241796	2001 QT_{190}	—	August 22, 2001	Socorro	LINEAR	·	5.4 km	MPC · JPL
241797	2001 QV_{190}	—	August 22, 2001	Socorro	LINEAR	URS	7.2 km	MPC · JPL
241798	2001 QO_{192}	—	August 22, 2001	Socorro	LINEAR	URS	6.2 km	MPC · JPL
241799	2001 QR_{196}	—	August 22, 2001	Socorro	LINEAR	·	4.2 km	MPC · JPL
241800	2001 QM_{199}	—	August 22, 2001	Palomar	NEAT	·	4.2 km	MPC · JPL

== 241801–241900 ==
back to top

Designation			Discovery			Properties		Ref
Permanent	Provisional	Named after	Date	Site	Discoverer(s)	Category	Diam.	Ref
241801	2001 QA_{227}	—	August 24, 2001	Anderson Mesa	LONEOS	·	2.7 km	MPC · JPL
241802	2001 QA_{259}	—	August 25, 2001	Socorro	LINEAR	·	4.1 km	MPC · JPL
241803	2001 QG_{274}	—	August 19, 2001	Socorro	LINEAR	·	4.6 km	MPC · JPL
241804	2001 QW_{282}	—	August 19, 2001	Haleakala	NEAT	(18466)	2.6 km	MPC · JPL
241805	2001 QA_{328}	—	August 21, 2001	Cerro Tololo	Deep Ecliptic Survey	·	2.6 km	MPC · JPL
241806	2001 QW_{333}	—	August 19, 2001	Socorro	LINEAR	·	2.0 km	MPC · JPL
241807	2001 RQ_{2}	—	September 8, 2001	Goodricke-Pigott	R. A. Tucker	·	1.6 km	MPC · JPL
241808	2001 RH_{9}	—	September 8, 2001	Socorro	LINEAR	·	4.5 km	MPC · JPL
241809	2001 RA_{16}	—	September 10, 2001	Socorro	LINEAR	·	8.0 km	MPC · JPL
241810	2001 RJ_{40}	—	September 10, 2001	Socorro	LINEAR	EOS	2.6 km	MPC · JPL
241811	2001 RW_{40}	—	September 11, 2001	Socorro	LINEAR	·	5.4 km	MPC · JPL
241812	2001 RH_{102}	—	September 12, 2001	Socorro	LINEAR	·	1.5 km	MPC · JPL
241813	2001 RR_{108}	—	September 12, 2001	Socorro	LINEAR	·	5.4 km	MPC · JPL
241814	2001 RB_{152}	—	September 11, 2001	Anderson Mesa	LONEOS	EOS	2.8 km	MPC · JPL
241815	2001 RV_{154}	—	September 12, 2001	Socorro	LINEAR	EOS	5.8 km	MPC · JPL
241816	2001 SA_{33}	—	September 16, 2001	Socorro	LINEAR	·	5.0 km	MPC · JPL
241817	2001 SH_{39}	—	September 16, 2001	Socorro	LINEAR	·	4.9 km	MPC · JPL
241818	2001 SR_{67}	—	September 17, 2001	Socorro	LINEAR	·	1.9 km	MPC · JPL
241819	2001 SW_{75}	—	September 19, 2001	Anderson Mesa	LONEOS	·	1.9 km	MPC · JPL
241820	2001 SY_{87}	—	September 20, 2001	Socorro	LINEAR	·	5.4 km	MPC · JPL
241821	2001 SZ_{92}	—	September 20, 2001	Socorro	LINEAR	·	2.4 km	MPC · JPL
241822	2001 SX_{107}	—	September 20, 2001	Socorro	LINEAR	DOR	5.3 km	MPC · JPL
241823	2001 SS_{135}	—	September 16, 2001	Socorro	LINEAR	·	6.5 km	MPC · JPL
241824	2001 SV_{142}	—	September 16, 2001	Socorro	LINEAR	LIX	6.6 km	MPC · JPL
241825	2001 SH_{170}	—	September 16, 2001	Socorro	LINEAR	·	5.3 km	MPC · JPL
241826	2001 SL_{209}	—	September 19, 2001	Socorro	LINEAR	·	3.4 km	MPC · JPL
241827	2001 SR_{209}	—	September 19, 2001	Socorro	LINEAR	THM	3.1 km	MPC · JPL
241828	2001 SF_{214}	—	September 19, 2001	Socorro	LINEAR	·	3.0 km	MPC · JPL
241829	2001 SP_{220}	—	September 19, 2001	Socorro	LINEAR	·	2.9 km	MPC · JPL
241830	2001 SK_{233}	—	September 19, 2001	Socorro	LINEAR	·	3.7 km	MPC · JPL
241831	2001 SL_{236}	—	September 19, 2001	Socorro	LINEAR	(13314)	3.5 km	MPC · JPL
241832	2001 SD_{238}	—	September 19, 2001	Socorro	LINEAR	·	4.8 km	MPC · JPL
241833	2001 SR_{259}	—	September 20, 2001	Socorro	LINEAR	·	680 m	MPC · JPL
241834	2001 SB_{290}	—	September 29, 2001	Palomar	NEAT	·	6.3 km	MPC · JPL
241835	2001 SX_{293}	—	September 19, 2001	Socorro	LINEAR	AST	2.9 km	MPC · JPL
241836	2001 SN_{295}	—	September 20, 2001	Socorro	LINEAR	·	3.3 km	MPC · JPL
241837	2001 SY_{313}	—	September 21, 2001	Socorro	LINEAR	·	6.5 km	MPC · JPL
241838	2001 SZ_{318}	—	September 21, 2001	Socorro	LINEAR	·	5.2 km	MPC · JPL
241839	2001 SO_{339}	—	September 21, 2001	Anderson Mesa	LONEOS	EUP	6.6 km	MPC · JPL
241840	2001 SR_{341}	—	September 21, 2001	Palomar	NEAT	·	3.9 km	MPC · JPL
241841	2001 SW_{341}	—	September 21, 2001	Anderson Mesa	LONEOS	T_{j} (2.98) · EUP	6.2 km	MPC · JPL
241842	2001 SY_{346}	—	September 25, 2001	Socorro	LINEAR	·	6.5 km	MPC · JPL
241843	2001 TY_{10}	—	October 13, 2001	Socorro	LINEAR	·	2.6 km	MPC · JPL
241844	2001 TY_{12}	—	October 11, 2001	Socorro	LINEAR	T_{j} (2.96)	7.0 km	MPC · JPL
241845	2001 TH_{14}	—	October 6, 2001	Palomar	NEAT	URS	7.0 km	MPC · JPL
241846	2001 TK_{34}	—	October 14, 2001	Socorro	LINEAR	·	4.0 km	MPC · JPL
241847	2001 TY_{54}	—	October 14, 2001	Socorro	LINEAR	·	3.7 km	MPC · JPL
241848	2001 TK_{67}	—	October 13, 2001	Socorro	LINEAR	·	940 m	MPC · JPL
241849	2001 TB_{86}	—	October 14, 2001	Socorro	LINEAR	·	3.1 km	MPC · JPL
241850	2001 TH_{86}	—	October 14, 2001	Socorro	LINEAR	·	3.1 km	MPC · JPL
241851	2001 TE_{92}	—	October 14, 2001	Socorro	LINEAR	EOS	2.9 km	MPC · JPL
241852	2001 TL_{94}	—	October 14, 2001	Socorro	LINEAR	NYS	2.2 km	MPC · JPL
241853	2001 TQ_{98}	—	October 14, 2001	Socorro	LINEAR	·	3.4 km	MPC · JPL
241854	2001 TL_{104}	—	October 15, 2001	Desert Eagle	W. K. Y. Yeung	·	4.6 km	MPC · JPL
241855	2001 TM_{109}	—	October 14, 2001	Socorro	LINEAR	DOR	4.0 km	MPC · JPL
241856	2001 TT_{119}	—	October 15, 2001	Socorro	LINEAR	·	4.3 km	MPC · JPL
241857	2001 TQ_{134}	—	October 13, 2001	Palomar	NEAT	·	4.5 km	MPC · JPL
241858	2001 TF_{171}	—	October 15, 2001	Palomar	NEAT	T_{j} (2.96)	7.5 km	MPC · JPL
241859	2001 TX_{171}	—	October 13, 2001	Anderson Mesa	LONEOS	LUT	7.4 km	MPC · JPL
241860	2001 TH_{178}	—	October 14, 2001	Socorro	LINEAR	(3025)	4.9 km	MPC · JPL
241861	2001 TX_{178}	—	October 14, 2001	Socorro	LINEAR	EOS	2.6 km	MPC · JPL
241862	2001 TE_{184}	—	October 14, 2001	Socorro	LINEAR	·	3.3 km	MPC · JPL
241863	2001 TG_{184}	—	October 14, 2001	Socorro	LINEAR	·	4.0 km	MPC · JPL
241864	2001 TL_{202}	—	October 11, 2001	Socorro	LINEAR	·	5.7 km	MPC · JPL
241865	2001 TX_{202}	—	October 11, 2001	Socorro	LINEAR	615	2.4 km	MPC · JPL
241866	2001 TA_{210}	—	October 13, 2001	Palomar	NEAT	·	3.0 km	MPC · JPL
241867	2001 TW_{214}	—	October 13, 2001	Palomar	NEAT	·	6.7 km	MPC · JPL
241868	2001 TY_{222}	—	October 14, 2001	Socorro	LINEAR	·	4.3 km	MPC · JPL
241869	2001 TW_{224}	—	October 14, 2001	Socorro	LINEAR	EOS	3.3 km	MPC · JPL
241870	2001 TW_{232}	—	October 15, 2001	Kitt Peak	Spacewatch	·	3.6 km	MPC · JPL
241871	2001 UL_{8}	—	October 17, 2001	Socorro	LINEAR	·	1.5 km	MPC · JPL
241872	2001 UR_{27}	—	October 23, 2001	Socorro	LINEAR	·	7.2 km	MPC · JPL
241873	2001 UP_{56}	—	October 17, 2001	Socorro	LINEAR	·	5.2 km	MPC · JPL
241874	2001 UW_{89}	—	October 21, 2001	Kitt Peak	Spacewatch	·	1.8 km	MPC · JPL
241875	2001 UB_{92}	—	October 18, 2001	Palomar	NEAT	·	6.1 km	MPC · JPL
241876	2001 UL_{121}	—	October 22, 2001	Socorro	LINEAR	·	4.5 km	MPC · JPL
241877	2001 UJ_{137}	—	October 23, 2001	Socorro	LINEAR	·	4.5 km	MPC · JPL
241878	2001 UR_{164}	—	October 19, 2001	Palomar	NEAT	·	2.3 km	MPC · JPL
241879	2001 UC_{185}	—	October 17, 2001	Palomar	NEAT	·	4.9 km	MPC · JPL
241880	2001 UZ_{201}	—	October 19, 2001	Palomar	NEAT	·	3.3 km	MPC · JPL
241881	2001 UD_{211}	—	October 21, 2001	Socorro	LINEAR	·	7.1 km	MPC · JPL
241882	2001 VJ_{8}	—	November 9, 2001	Socorro	LINEAR	·	890 m	MPC · JPL
241883	2001 VC_{31}	—	November 9, 2001	Socorro	LINEAR	·	2.8 km	MPC · JPL
241884	2001 VB_{34}	—	November 9, 2001	Socorro	LINEAR	615	3.0 km	MPC · JPL
241885	2001 VK_{45}	—	November 9, 2001	Socorro	LINEAR	·	4.2 km	MPC · JPL
241886	2001 VX_{46}	—	November 9, 2001	Socorro	LINEAR	EUP	6.5 km	MPC · JPL
241887	2001 VK_{56}	—	November 10, 2001	Socorro	LINEAR	·	3.0 km	MPC · JPL
241888	2001 VM_{91}	—	November 15, 2001	Socorro	LINEAR	·	5.1 km	MPC · JPL
241889	2001 VA_{96}	—	November 15, 2001	Socorro	LINEAR	·	4.4 km	MPC · JPL
241890	2001 VR_{108}	—	November 12, 2001	Socorro	LINEAR	·	2.8 km	MPC · JPL
241891	2001 WD_{6}	—	November 17, 2001	Socorro	LINEAR	·	3.1 km	MPC · JPL
241892	2001 WR_{10}	—	November 17, 2001	Socorro	LINEAR	·	3.0 km	MPC · JPL
241893	2001 WF_{12}	—	November 17, 2001	Socorro	LINEAR	·	4.1 km	MPC · JPL
241894	2001 WM_{27}	—	November 17, 2001	Socorro	LINEAR	·	3.3 km	MPC · JPL
241895	2001 WF_{43}	—	November 18, 2001	Socorro	LINEAR	DOR	4.3 km	MPC · JPL
241896	2001 WQ_{72}	—	November 20, 2001	Socorro	LINEAR	·	1.8 km	MPC · JPL
241897	2001 XQ_{10}	—	December 10, 2001	Socorro	LINEAR	BAR	2.5 km	MPC · JPL
241898	2001 XL_{72}	—	December 11, 2001	Socorro	LINEAR	·	3.0 km	MPC · JPL
241899	2001 XE_{132}	—	December 14, 2001	Socorro	LINEAR	·	3.3 km	MPC · JPL
241900	2001 XF_{141}	—	December 14, 2001	Socorro	LINEAR	·	3.4 km	MPC · JPL

== 241901–242000 ==
back to top

Designation			Discovery			Properties		Ref
Permanent	Provisional	Named after	Date	Site	Discoverer(s)	Category	Diam.	Ref
241901	2001 XF_{149}	—	December 14, 2001	Socorro	LINEAR	(5)	1.6 km	MPC · JPL
241902	2001 XR_{187}	—	December 14, 2001	Socorro	LINEAR	·	6.6 km	MPC · JPL
241903	2001 XF_{212}	—	December 11, 2001	Socorro	LINEAR	(5)	3.0 km	MPC · JPL
241904	2001 XP_{213}	—	December 11, 2001	Socorro	LINEAR	(5)	3.5 km	MPC · JPL
241905	2001 XW_{259}	—	December 9, 2001	Anderson Mesa	LONEOS	·	990 m	MPC · JPL
241906	2001 YR_{86}	—	December 18, 2001	Socorro	LINEAR	·	7.5 km	MPC · JPL
241907	2001 YN_{104}	—	December 17, 2001	Socorro	LINEAR	EOS	3.4 km	MPC · JPL
241908	2001 YH_{142}	—	December 17, 2001	Kitt Peak	Spacewatch	·	3.4 km	MPC · JPL
241909	2001 YS_{148}	—	December 18, 2001	Socorro	LINEAR	·	1.6 km	MPC · JPL
241910	2002 AH_{12}	—	January 10, 2002	Campo Imperatore	CINEOS	NYS	2.3 km	MPC · JPL
241911	2002 AV_{22}	—	January 5, 2002	Palomar	NEAT	·	1.7 km	MPC · JPL
241912	2002 AE_{36}	—	January 9, 2002	Socorro	LINEAR	·	2.4 km	MPC · JPL
241913	2002 AP_{47}	—	January 9, 2002	Socorro	LINEAR	·	4.7 km	MPC · JPL
241914	2002 AZ_{54}	—	January 9, 2002	Socorro	LINEAR	·	6.5 km	MPC · JPL
241915	2002 AK_{60}	—	January 9, 2002	Socorro	LINEAR	HNS	2.2 km	MPC · JPL
241916	2002 AE_{90}	—	January 11, 2002	Socorro	LINEAR	PHO	3.0 km	MPC · JPL
241917	2002 AK_{146}	—	January 13, 2002	Socorro	LINEAR	·	1.9 km	MPC · JPL
241918	2002 AQ_{150}	—	January 14, 2002	Socorro	LINEAR	·	4.7 km	MPC · JPL
241919	2002 AK_{182}	—	January 5, 2002	Palomar	NEAT	·	5.1 km	MPC · JPL
241920	2002 AD_{186}	—	January 8, 2002	Socorro	LINEAR	·	2.0 km	MPC · JPL
241921	2002 AG_{186}	—	January 8, 2002	Socorro	LINEAR	·	1.8 km	MPC · JPL
241922	2002 BU	—	January 21, 2002	Desert Eagle	W. K. Y. Yeung	H	880 m	MPC · JPL
241923	2002 BM_{23}	—	January 23, 2002	Socorro	LINEAR	·	3.8 km	MPC · JPL
241924	2002 CH_{12}	—	February 7, 2002	Socorro	LINEAR	·	1.3 km	MPC · JPL
241925	2002 CP_{22}	—	February 5, 2002	Palomar	NEAT	DOR	5.5 km	MPC · JPL
241926	2002 CK_{23}	—	February 5, 2002	Haleakala	NEAT	·	2.3 km	MPC · JPL
241927	2002 CT_{32}	—	February 6, 2002	Socorro	LINEAR	·	1.9 km	MPC · JPL
241928	2002 CF_{33}	—	February 6, 2002	Socorro	LINEAR	PHO	3.5 km	MPC · JPL
241929	2002 CP_{36}	—	February 7, 2002	Socorro	LINEAR	·	1.7 km	MPC · JPL
241930	2002 CC_{38}	—	February 7, 2002	Socorro	LINEAR	HNS	2.0 km	MPC · JPL
241931	2002 CF_{39}	—	February 11, 2002	Desert Eagle	W. K. Y. Yeung	·	2.7 km	MPC · JPL
241932	2002 CF_{46}	—	February 8, 2002	Palomar	NEAT	PHO	1.5 km	MPC · JPL
241933	2002 CO_{48}	—	February 3, 2002	Haleakala	NEAT	·	2.8 km	MPC · JPL
241934	2002 CA_{60}	—	February 6, 2002	Socorro	LINEAR	·	4.4 km	MPC · JPL
241935	2002 CN_{70}	—	February 7, 2002	Socorro	LINEAR	·	4.4 km	MPC · JPL
241936	2002 CX_{82}	—	February 7, 2002	Socorro	LINEAR	MAS	830 m	MPC · JPL
241937	2002 CG_{86}	—	February 7, 2002	Socorro	LINEAR	(2076)	980 m	MPC · JPL
241938	2002 CE_{96}	—	February 7, 2002	Socorro	LINEAR	·	1.5 km	MPC · JPL
241939	2002 CB_{122}	—	February 7, 2002	Socorro	LINEAR	·	2.0 km	MPC · JPL
241940	2002 CS_{122}	—	February 7, 2002	Socorro	LINEAR	MAS	940 m	MPC · JPL
241941	2002 CY_{135}	—	February 8, 2002	Socorro	LINEAR	·	1.5 km	MPC · JPL
241942	2002 CQ_{136}	—	February 8, 2002	Socorro	LINEAR	JUN	1.9 km	MPC · JPL
241943	2002 CR_{138}	—	February 8, 2002	Socorro	LINEAR	·	2.7 km	MPC · JPL
241944	2002 CU_{147}	—	February 10, 2002	Socorro	LINEAR	T_{j} (2.6)	17 km	MPC · JPL
241945	2002 CJ_{198}	—	February 10, 2002	Socorro	LINEAR	·	4.8 km	MPC · JPL
241946	2002 CR_{219}	—	February 10, 2002	Socorro	LINEAR	·	2.2 km	MPC · JPL
241947	2002 CY_{238}	—	February 11, 2002	Socorro	LINEAR	NYS	1.6 km	MPC · JPL
241948	2002 CV_{259}	—	February 7, 2002	Kitt Peak	Spacewatch	·	2.3 km	MPC · JPL
241949	2002 CV_{286}	—	February 8, 2002	Anderson Mesa	LONEOS	·	3.2 km	MPC · JPL
241950	2002 DA_{3}	—	February 17, 2002	Needville	Needville	·	4.6 km	MPC · JPL
241951	2002 DD_{3}	—	February 19, 2002	Socorro	LINEAR	·	2.4 km	MPC · JPL
241952	2002 DD_{8}	—	February 19, 2002	Socorro	LINEAR	·	3.5 km	MPC · JPL
241953	2002 DH_{11}	—	February 20, 2002	Socorro	LINEAR	PHO	2.9 km	MPC · JPL
241954	2002 ER_{7}	—	March 10, 2002	Socorro	LINEAR	PHO	2.2 km	MPC · JPL
241955	2002 ET_{7}	—	March 12, 2002	Socorro	LINEAR	·	3.1 km	MPC · JPL
241956	2002 ET_{8}	—	March 12, 2002	Palomar	NEAT	L4	10 km	MPC · JPL
241957	2002 EO_{46}	—	March 11, 2002	Haleakala	NEAT	·	1.7 km	MPC · JPL
241958	2002 ED_{72}	—	March 13, 2002	Socorro	LINEAR	L4	13 km	MPC · JPL
241959	2002 EE_{102}	—	March 6, 2002	Socorro	LINEAR	PHO	1.6 km	MPC · JPL
241960	2002 EK_{122}	—	March 12, 2002	Palomar	NEAT	·	1.7 km	MPC · JPL
241961	2002 EN_{148}	—	March 15, 2002	Palomar	NEAT	·	1.5 km	MPC · JPL
241962	2002 FA_{10}	—	March 16, 2002	Socorro	LINEAR	·	3.4 km	MPC · JPL
241963	2002 FQ_{28}	—	March 20, 2002	Socorro	LINEAR	·	2.3 km	MPC · JPL
241964	2002 FC_{35}	—	March 20, 2002	Kitt Peak	Spacewatch	·	1.5 km	MPC · JPL
241965	2002 FP_{36}	—	March 20, 2002	Kitt Peak	Spacewatch	·	2.3 km	MPC · JPL
241966	2002 GC_{4}	—	April 9, 2002	Palomar	NEAT	PHO	2.5 km	MPC · JPL
241967	2002 GO_{10}	—	April 8, 2002	Bergisch Gladbach	W. Bickel	·	2.3 km	MPC · JPL
241968	2002 GM_{11}	—	April 14, 2002	Desert Eagle	W. K. Y. Yeung	DOR	3.3 km	MPC · JPL
241969	2002 GT_{63}	—	April 8, 2002	Palomar	NEAT	NAE	4.5 km	MPC · JPL
241970	2002 GY_{104}	—	April 10, 2002	Socorro	LINEAR	·	1.4 km	MPC · JPL
241971	2002 GL_{106}	—	April 11, 2002	Anderson Mesa	LONEOS	EUP	6.7 km	MPC · JPL
241972	2002 GB_{119}	—	April 12, 2002	Palomar	NEAT	·	5.6 km	MPC · JPL
241973	2002 GV_{163}	—	April 14, 2002	Palomar	NEAT	·	2.8 km	MPC · JPL
241974	2002 HT_{2}	—	April 16, 2002	Socorro	LINEAR	·	2.6 km	MPC · JPL
241975	2002 JZ_{23}	—	May 8, 2002	Socorro	LINEAR	KRM	3.2 km	MPC · JPL
241976	2002 JK_{41}	—	May 8, 2002	Socorro	LINEAR	·	1.5 km	MPC · JPL
241977	2002 JO_{46}	—	May 9, 2002	Socorro	LINEAR	V	1.4 km	MPC · JPL
241978	2002 JC_{78}	—	May 11, 2002	Socorro	LINEAR	PHO	2.9 km	MPC · JPL
241979	2002 JR_{109}	—	May 11, 2002	Socorro	LINEAR	·	1.7 km	MPC · JPL
241980	2002 JM_{113}	—	May 15, 2002	Palomar	NEAT	·	5.0 km	MPC · JPL
241981	2002 JZ_{139}	—	May 10, 2002	Palomar	NEAT	EUN	3.4 km	MPC · JPL
241982	2002 JX_{145}	—	May 15, 2002	Palomar	NEAT	·	3.5 km	MPC · JPL
241983	2002 KF	—	May 16, 2002	Fountain Hills	Hills, Fountain	·	3.2 km	MPC · JPL
241984	2002 LG	—	June 1, 2002	Palomar	NEAT	·	3.5 km	MPC · JPL
241985	2002 LC_{11}	—	June 5, 2002	Socorro	LINEAR	·	2.1 km	MPC · JPL
241986	2002 LA_{47}	—	June 15, 2002	Socorro	LINEAR	·	2.1 km	MPC · JPL
241987	2002 LB_{47}	—	June 14, 2002	Reedy Creek	J. Broughton	·	1.9 km	MPC · JPL
241988	2002 LZ_{52}	—	June 8, 2002	Socorro	LINEAR	·	6.3 km	MPC · JPL
241989	2002 LT_{59}	—	June 8, 2002	Socorro	LINEAR	EUN	2.0 km	MPC · JPL
241990	2002 NN_{5}	—	July 10, 2002	Campo Imperatore	CINEOS	HOF	3.4 km	MPC · JPL
241991	2002 NK_{9}	—	July 3, 2002	Palomar	NEAT	·	2.6 km	MPC · JPL
241992	2002 NE_{21}	—	July 9, 2002	Socorro	LINEAR	(5)	1.9 km	MPC · JPL
241993	2002 NM_{39}	—	July 14, 2002	Socorro	LINEAR	·	3.5 km	MPC · JPL
241994	2002 NK_{42}	—	July 14, 2002	Palomar	NEAT	T_{j} (2.98) · 3:2	7.8 km	MPC · JPL
241995	2002 NS_{43}	—	July 9, 2002	Socorro	LINEAR	·	1.6 km	MPC · JPL
241996	2002 NU_{59}	—	July 8, 2002	Palomar	NEAT	·	5.5 km	MPC · JPL
241997	2002 NX_{67}	—	July 4, 2002	Palomar	NEAT	·	1.3 km	MPC · JPL
241998	2002 NB_{74}	—	July 12, 2002	Palomar	NEAT	VER	4.5 km	MPC · JPL
241999	2002 OT_{7}	—	July 19, 2002	Palomar	NEAT	EUN ·	3.2 km	MPC · JPL
242000	2002 OB_{12}	—	July 18, 2002	Socorro	LINEAR	·	2.6 km	MPC · JPL

back to top

== See also ==
- Meanings of minor-planet names: 241001–242000
