= Meanings of minor-planet names: 241001–242000 =

As minor planet discoveries are confirmed, they are given a permanent number by the IAU's Minor Planet Center (MPC), and the discoverers can then submit names for them, following the IAU's naming conventions. The list below concerns those minor planets in the specified number-range that have received names, and explains the meanings of those names.

Official naming citations of newly named small Solar System bodies are approved and published in a bulletin by IAU's Working Group for Small Bodies Nomenclature (WGSBN). Before May 2021, citations were published in MPC's Minor Planet Circulars for many decades. Recent citations can also be found on the JPL Small-Body Database (SBDB). Until his death in 2016, German astronomer Lutz D. Schmadel compiled these citations into the Dictionary of Minor Planet Names (DMP) and regularly updated the collection.

Based on Paul Herget's The Names of the Minor Planets, Schmadel also researched the unclear origin of numerous asteroids, most of which had been named prior to World War II. This article incorporates text from this source, which is in the public domain: SBDB New namings may only be added to this list below after official publication as the preannouncement of names is condemned. The WGSBN publishes a comprehensive guideline for the naming rules of non-cometary small Solar System bodies.

== 241001–241100 ==
Named minor planet	Provisional	This minor planet was named for...	Ref · Catalog
241090 Nemet	2006 UK_{290}	Timothy Nemet (born 1996) displayed unrivaled enthusiasm in the pursuit of astronomical knowledge, following in the Canadian tradition of astronomical excellence and embodying the spirit of Beyond the International Year of Astronomy.	JPL · 241090

== 241101–241200 ==
back to top

Named minor planet	Provisional	This minor planet was named for...	Ref · Catalog
241113 Zhongda	2007 OU_{4}	The Sun Yat-sen University, also unofficially referred as Zhongshan University, is ranked as one of China's top universities. The first discoverer spent part of his childhood as well as his undergraduate career at the university.	JPL · 241113
241136 Sandstede	2007 QY_{11}	Gerd Sandstede (born 1929), a German chemist active in the development of fuel cells, and a former director of the Battelle Institute, Frankfurt	JPL · 241136
241153 Omegagigia	2007 RQ_{39}	The astronomical society "Omega" (Sociedad Astronómica Asturiana) is based in Gijón, northern Spain. The society was founded in 1981, and awarded a silver medal from the city council of Gijón on the occasion of society's 40th anniversary in 2021. In the asteroid's name, "Gigia" is the Latin name of Gijón.	IAU · 241153
241192 Pulyny	2007 SH_{6}	The Ukrainian town of Pulyny (also known as Chervonoarmijsk), located in the country's northern province of Zhytomyr Oblast. It is the birthplace of the writers Girsh Diamont (1911–1941), Ernst Kontschak (1903–1979) and Svyatoslav Borodulin (born 1927).	JPL · 241192

== 241201–241300 ==
back to top

Named minor planet	Provisional	This minor planet was named for...	Ref · Catalog
241276 Guntramlampert	2007 TF_{436}	Guntram Lampert (born 1967) is an Austrian pharmacist, amateur astronomer and telescope maker. He has built a number of Schiefspiegler telescopes and has an excellent reputation as an optician in this field.	JPL · 241276

== 241301–241400 ==
back to top

Named minor planet	Provisional	This minor planet was named for...	Ref · Catalog
241362 Nesiotites	2007 YH_{2}	Nesiotites is an extinct genus of giant shrew, in the family Soricidae, which was endemic to the Balearic Islands until c. 2200 BCE.	IAU · 241362
241363 Érdibálint	2007 YA_{4}	Bálint Érdi (born 1945), a Hungarian astronomer and full professor at the Eötvös University in Budapest	JPL · 241363
241364 Reneangelil	2008 AR_{2}	René Angélil (1942–2016) was a Canadian music producer and singer. Inspired by the cosmos, his motto was generosity. He helped many friends and artists such as world-renowned singer Céline Dion reach their full potential.	IAU · 241364
241368 Hildjózsef	2008 DL	József Hild (1789–1867), a Hungarian architect.	IAU · 241368
241373 Richardmoissl	2008 RM	Richard Moissl (b. 1977) is a solar system physicist with a specialization in small bodies. He participated in the Rosetta mission to comet 67P, the BepiColombo mission to Mercury and worked on the preparation of the Hera proximity observations.	IAU · 241373

== 241401–241500 ==
back to top

Named minor planet	Provisional	This minor planet was named for...	Ref · Catalog
241418 Darmstadt	2008 UX_{201}	Darmstadt, a German city known for its architecture of the Art Nouveau	JPL · 241418
241442 Shandongkexie	2008 YN_{9}	Shandongkexie is the Chinese phonetic alphabet representation of the Shandong Association for Science and Technology	JPL · 241442
241475 Martinagedeck	2009 BK_{14}	Martina Gedeck (born 1961), a German actresses	JPL · 241475

== 241501–241600 ==
back to top

Named minor planet	Provisional	This minor planet was named for...	Ref · Catalog
241509 Sessler	2009 DT_{26}	Gerhard M. Sessler (born 1931) is professor of Electroacoustics at Technischen Universität Darmstadt.	JPL · 241509
241527 Edwardwright	2010 CK_{9}	Edward L. Wright (born 1947), the Principal Investigator of the Wide-field Infrared Survey Explorer mission and a professor at UCLA.	JPL · 241527
241528 Tubman	2010 CA_{10}	Harriet Tubman (c. 1822–1913), a "conductor" on the Underground Railroad.	JPL · 241528
241529 Roccutri	2010 CA_{14}	Roc Cutri (born 1957), an astronomer specializing in analyzing large astronomical datasets.	JPL · 241529
241538 Chudniv	2010 EV_{42}	Chudniv, the small town of in northern Ukraine.	JPL · 241538

== 241601–241700 ==
back to top

Named minor planet	Provisional	This minor planet was named for...	Ref · Catalog
There are no named minor planets in this number range

== 241701–241800 ==
back to top

Named minor planet	Provisional	This minor planet was named for...	Ref · Catalog
There are no named minor planets in this number range

== 241801–241900 ==
back to top

Named minor planet	Provisional	This minor planet was named for...	Ref · Catalog
There are no named minor planets in this number range

== 241901–242000 ==
back to top

Named minor planet	Provisional	This minor planet was named for...	Ref · Catalog
There are no named minor planets in this number range

back to top

Preceded by 240,001–241,000	Meanings of minor-planet names List of minor planets: 241,001–242,000	Succeeded by 242,001–243,000
