= Meanings of minor-planet names: 242001–243000 =

As minor planet discoveries are confirmed, they are given a permanent number by the IAU's Minor Planet Center (MPC), and the discoverers can then submit names for them, following the IAU's naming conventions. The list below concerns those minor planets in the specified number-range that have received names, and explains the meanings of those names.

Official naming citations of newly named small Solar System bodies are approved and published in a bulletin by IAU's Working Group for Small Bodies Nomenclature (WGSBN). Before May 2021, citations were published in MPC's Minor Planet Circulars for many decades. Recent citations can also be found on the JPL Small-Body Database (SBDB). Until his death in 2016, German astronomer Lutz D. Schmadel compiled these citations into the Dictionary of Minor Planet Names (DMP) and regularly updated the collection.

Based on Paul Herget's The Names of the Minor Planets, Schmadel also researched the unclear origin of numerous asteroids, most of which had been named prior to World War II. This article incorporates text from this source, which is in the public domain: SBDB New namings may only be added to this list below after official publication as the preannouncement of names is condemned. The WGSBN publishes a comprehensive guideline for the naming rules of non-cometary small Solar System bodies.

== 242001–242100 ==
Named minor planet	Provisional	This minor planet was named for...	Ref · Catalog
There are no named minor planets in this number range

== 242101–242200 ==
back to top

Named minor planet	Provisional	This minor planet was named for...	Ref · Catalog
There are no named minor planets in this number range

== 242201–242300 ==
back to top

Named minor planet	Provisional	This minor planet was named for...	Ref · Catalog
242235 Marieskálová	2003 SM_{129}	Marie Skálová, Czech teacher and writer. Her book The Guilt of the Innocents recalls her childhood and adolescence in Mezipotočí, a small village near Kleť mountain from 1928 and 1945.	IAU · 242235

== 242301–242400 ==
back to top

Named minor planet	Provisional	This minor planet was named for...	Ref · Catalog
242321 Billtilden	2003 WB_{170}	James Wilson Tilden, American entomologist, best known for his books Butterflies of the San Francisco Bay and A Field Guide to Western Butterflies.	IAU · 242321

== 242401–242500 ==
back to top

Named minor planet	Provisional	This minor planet was named for...	Ref · Catalog
242479 Marijampole	2004 TF_{115}	Marijampolė, with a population of 36,000 is the largest city in the Suvalkija region of south-west Lithuania.	JPL · 242479
242492 Fantomas	2004 VU_{65}	Fantomas is one of the most popular characters in the history of French crime fiction. Fantomas was created in 1911 by Marcel Allain and Pierre Souvestre.	JPL · 242492

== 242501–242600 ==
back to top

Named minor planet	Provisional	This minor planet was named for...	Ref · Catalog
242516 Lindseystirling	2005 AW	Lindsey Stirling (born 1986), an American violinist, dancer and composer	JPL · 242516
242523 Kreszgéza	2005 AJ_{10}	Géza Kresz (1846–1901), a Hungarian physician	JPL · 242523
242529 Hilaomar	2005 AL_{54}	Hila Omar, a Moroccan amateur astronomer and promoter of science. He has constructed an observatory with a 60-cm telescope in a cultural center south of the city of Marrakesh.	JPL · 242529

== 242601–242700 ==
back to top

Named minor planet	Provisional	This minor planet was named for...	Ref · Catalog
242648 Fribourg	2005 NQ_{63}	The Swiss canton and city of Fribourg, a young, dynamic and bilingual region near the country's capital, Bern	JPL · 242648

== 242701–242800 ==
back to top

Named minor planet	Provisional	This minor planet was named for...	Ref · Catalog
There are no named minor planets in this number range

== 242801–242900 ==
back to top

Named minor planet	Provisional	This minor planet was named for...	Ref · Catalog
242830 Richardwessling	2006 DK_{8}	Richard J. Wessling (1935–2010) worked at U.S. Precision Lens for 35 years, making telescope mirrors from the early 1960s onwards and opening the Pines Optical Shop in 1991.	JPL · 242830

== 242901–243000 ==
back to top

Named minor planet	Provisional	This minor planet was named for...	Ref · Catalog
243000 Katysirles	2006 TB_{112}	Katherine Ann Sirles (1980–2016) was a sociologist and beloved teacher who studied the sociology of drugs, deviant behavior and gender.	JPL · 243000

back to top

Preceded by 241,001–242,000	Meanings of minor-planet names List of minor planets: 242,001–243,000	Succeeded by 243,001–244,000
