= List of minor planets: 242001–243000 =

The following is a partial list of minor planets, running from minor-planet number 242001 through 243000, inclusive. The primary data for this and other partial lists is based on JPL's "Small-Body Orbital Elements" and data available from the Minor Planet Center. Critical list information is also provided by the MPC, unless otherwise specified from Lowell Observatory. A detailed description of the table's columns and additional sources are given on the main page including a complete list of every page in this series, and a statistical break-up on the dynamical classification of minor planets.

Also see the summary list of all named bodies in numerical and alphabetical order, and the corresponding naming citations for the number range of this particular list. New namings may only be added to this list after official publication, as the preannouncement of names is condemned by the Working Group for Small Bodies Nomenclature of the International Astronomical Union.

Near-Earth obj.	MBA (inner)	MBA (outer)	Centaur
Mars-crosser	MBA (middle)	Jupiter trojan	Trans-Neptunian obj.
Unclassified

== 242001–242100 ==
Designation			Discovery			Properties		Ref
Permanent	Provisional	Named after	Date	Site	Discoverer(s)	Category	Diam.	Ref
242001	2002 OA_{15}	—	July 18, 2002	Socorro	LINEAR	·	1.8 km	MPC · JPL
242002	2002 PX_{1}	—	August 4, 2002	Reedy Creek	J. Broughton	·	4.2 km	MPC · JPL
242003	2002 PZ_{19}	—	August 6, 2002	Palomar	NEAT	·	1.9 km	MPC · JPL
242004	2002 PW_{37}	—	August 5, 2002	Palomar	NEAT	·	6.3 km	MPC · JPL
242005	2002 PS_{70}	—	August 11, 2002	Socorro	LINEAR	·	3.4 km	MPC · JPL
242006	2002 PM_{72}	—	August 12, 2002	Socorro	LINEAR	·	3.7 km	MPC · JPL
242007	2002 PP_{73}	—	August 12, 2002	Socorro	LINEAR	ADE	3.3 km	MPC · JPL
242008	2002 PY_{81}	—	August 9, 2002	Socorro	LINEAR	T_{j} (2.97) · HIL	7.6 km	MPC · JPL
242009	2002 PO_{87}	—	August 13, 2002	Socorro	LINEAR	H	790 m	MPC · JPL
242010	2002 PN_{91}	—	August 14, 2002	Socorro	LINEAR	·	3.8 km	MPC · JPL
242011	2002 PP_{93}	—	August 14, 2002	Palomar	NEAT	·	3.3 km	MPC · JPL
242012	2002 PV_{110}	—	August 13, 2002	Anderson Mesa	LONEOS	·	5.0 km	MPC · JPL
242013	2002 PJ_{116}	—	August 14, 2002	Palomar	NEAT	·	3.0 km	MPC · JPL
242014	2002 PW_{139}	—	August 13, 2002	Socorro	LINEAR	·	2.6 km	MPC · JPL
242015	2002 PJ_{160}	—	August 8, 2002	Palomar	S. F. Hönig	·	1.3 km	MPC · JPL
242016	2002 PZ_{160}	—	August 8, 2002	Palomar	S. F. Hönig	T_{j} (2.96) · HIL · slow	6.4 km	MPC · JPL
242017	2002 PF_{185}	—	August 7, 2002	Palomar	NEAT	VER	5.1 km	MPC · JPL
242018	2002 QK	—	August 16, 2002	Anderson Mesa	LONEOS	·	4.5 km	MPC · JPL
242019	2002 QD_{1}	—	August 16, 2002	Palomar	NEAT	·	3.4 km	MPC · JPL
242020	2002 QW_{9}	—	August 20, 2002	Palomar	NEAT	·	3.8 km	MPC · JPL
242021	2002 QD_{14}	—	August 26, 2002	Palomar	NEAT	·	5.3 km	MPC · JPL
242022	2002 QH_{16}	—	August 26, 2002	Palomar	NEAT	·	3.1 km	MPC · JPL
242023	2002 QH_{33}	—	August 29, 2002	Palomar	NEAT	·	3.0 km	MPC · JPL
242024	2002 QB_{50}	—	August 29, 2002	Palomar	R. Matson	·	2.1 km	MPC · JPL
242025	2002 QP_{53}	—	August 29, 2002	Palomar	S. F. Hönig	·	5.0 km	MPC · JPL
242026	2002 QG_{60}	—	August 16, 2002	Palomar	NEAT	·	2.1 km	MPC · JPL
242027	2002 QX_{64}	—	August 16, 2002	Haleakala	NEAT	·	2.4 km	MPC · JPL
242028	2002 QY_{68}	—	August 17, 2002	Palomar	NEAT	·	3.3 km	MPC · JPL
242029	2002 QM_{75}	—	August 30, 2002	Palomar	NEAT	·	2.1 km	MPC · JPL
242030	2002 QG_{81}	—	August 16, 2002	Palomar	NEAT	·	2.1 km	MPC · JPL
242031	2002 QB_{94}	—	August 18, 2002	Palomar	NEAT	·	4.4 km	MPC · JPL
242032	2002 QH_{120}	—	August 30, 2002	Palomar	NEAT	·	3.4 km	MPC · JPL
242033	2002 QF_{123}	—	August 27, 2002	Palomar	NEAT	·	2.5 km	MPC · JPL
242034	2002 QK_{124}	—	August 16, 2002	Palomar	NEAT	·	1.5 km	MPC · JPL
242035	2002 QV_{135}	—	August 30, 2002	Palomar	NEAT	·	2.7 km	MPC · JPL
242036	2002 RZ_{32}	—	September 4, 2002	Anderson Mesa	LONEOS	·	1.6 km	MPC · JPL
242037	2002 RJ_{33}	—	September 4, 2002	Anderson Mesa	LONEOS	·	3.1 km	MPC · JPL
242038	2002 RZ_{38}	—	September 5, 2002	Anderson Mesa	LONEOS	·	1.5 km	MPC · JPL
242039	2002 RC_{61}	—	September 5, 2002	Anderson Mesa	LONEOS	·	2.8 km	MPC · JPL
242040	2002 RF_{71}	—	September 4, 2002	Palomar	NEAT	·	2.5 km	MPC · JPL
242041	2002 RH_{99}	—	September 5, 2002	Socorro	LINEAR	·	2.6 km	MPC · JPL
242042	2002 RK_{114}	—	September 5, 2002	Socorro	LINEAR	·	4.0 km	MPC · JPL
242043	2002 RA_{122}	—	September 8, 2002	Haleakala	NEAT	·	4.3 km	MPC · JPL
242044	2002 RH_{132}	—	September 11, 2002	Palomar	NEAT	NAE	4.9 km	MPC · JPL
242045	2002 RJ_{135}	—	September 10, 2002	Haleakala	NEAT	·	1.7 km	MPC · JPL
242046	2002 RX_{139}	—	September 10, 2002	Palomar	NEAT	·	2.1 km	MPC · JPL
242047	2002 RD_{140}	—	September 10, 2002	Palomar	NEAT	EUN	1.7 km	MPC · JPL
242048	2002 RF_{143}	—	September 11, 2002	Palomar	NEAT	·	2.3 km	MPC · JPL
242049	2002 RR_{144}	—	September 11, 2002	Palomar	NEAT	·	4.1 km	MPC · JPL
242050	2002 RZ_{203}	—	September 14, 2002	Palomar	NEAT	(13314)	4.0 km	MPC · JPL
242051	2002 RF_{222}	—	September 15, 2002	Haleakala	NEAT	EOS	3.5 km	MPC · JPL
242052	2002 RE_{229}	—	September 14, 2002	Haleakala	NEAT	DOR	3.9 km	MPC · JPL
242053	2002 RV_{244}	—	September 14, 2002	Palomar	NEAT	·	3.1 km	MPC · JPL
242054	2002 RJ_{248}	—	September 14, 2002	Palomar	NEAT	·	3.0 km	MPC · JPL
242055	2002 RO_{255}	—	September 3, 2002	Palomar	NEAT	·	6.5 km	MPC · JPL
242056	2002 RX_{260}	—	September 10, 2002	Palomar	NEAT	·	3.7 km	MPC · JPL
242057	2002 SB_{3}	—	September 27, 2002	Palomar	NEAT	·	1.8 km	MPC · JPL
242058	2002 SS_{19}	—	September 27, 2002	Socorro	LINEAR	·	1.4 km	MPC · JPL
242059	2002 ST_{30}	—	September 28, 2002	Haleakala	NEAT	KON	4.4 km	MPC · JPL
242060	2002 SR_{31}	—	September 28, 2002	Haleakala	NEAT	·	4.7 km	MPC · JPL
242061	2002 SO_{73}	—	September 16, 2002	Palomar	NEAT	·	1.7 km	MPC · JPL
242062	2002 TE_{3}	—	October 1, 2002	Anderson Mesa	LONEOS	·	4.7 km	MPC · JPL
242063	2002 TN_{17}	—	October 2, 2002	Socorro	LINEAR	·	2.1 km	MPC · JPL
242064	2002 TF_{44}	—	October 2, 2002	Socorro	LINEAR	·	1.9 km	MPC · JPL
242065	2002 TQ_{50}	—	October 2, 2002	Socorro	LINEAR	T_{j} (2.99) · EUP	7.0 km	MPC · JPL
242066	2002 TS_{55}	—	October 2, 2002	Haleakala	NEAT	(5)	1.5 km	MPC · JPL
242067	2002 TF_{70}	—	October 2, 2002	Campo Imperatore	CINEOS	·	3.2 km	MPC · JPL
242068	2002 TY_{78}	—	October 1, 2002	Socorro	LINEAR	·	3.4 km	MPC · JPL
242069	2002 TE_{91}	—	October 3, 2002	Palomar	NEAT	LIX	5.8 km	MPC · JPL
242070	2002 TP_{130}	—	October 4, 2002	Socorro	LINEAR	·	1.3 km	MPC · JPL
242071	2002 TR_{135}	—	October 4, 2002	Palomar	NEAT	·	4.6 km	MPC · JPL
242072	2002 TM_{136}	—	October 4, 2002	Anderson Mesa	LONEOS	LIX	6.0 km	MPC · JPL
242073	2002 TD_{164}	—	October 5, 2002	Palomar	NEAT	·	3.0 km	MPC · JPL
242074	2002 TN_{171}	—	October 3, 2002	Palomar	NEAT	·	3.1 km	MPC · JPL
242075	2002 TD_{176}	—	October 4, 2002	Anderson Mesa	LONEOS	·	5.2 km	MPC · JPL
242076	2002 TG_{179}	—	October 13, 2002	Palomar	NEAT	·	2.0 km	MPC · JPL
242077	2002 TE_{187}	—	October 4, 2002	Socorro	LINEAR	·	3.7 km	MPC · JPL
242078	2002 TH_{191}	—	October 3, 2002	Palomar	NEAT	·	2.9 km	MPC · JPL
242079	2002 TK_{191}	—	October 5, 2002	Anderson Mesa	LONEOS	·	3.7 km	MPC · JPL
242080	2002 TW_{192}	—	October 3, 2002	Kitt Peak	Spacewatch	ADE	3.2 km	MPC · JPL
242081	2002 TG_{212}	—	October 7, 2002	Haleakala	NEAT	·	2.5 km	MPC · JPL
242082	2002 TV_{216}	—	October 6, 2002	Palomar	NEAT	THB	5.4 km	MPC · JPL
242083	2002 TT_{221}	—	October 7, 2002	Socorro	LINEAR	·	2.1 km	MPC · JPL
242084	2002 TQ_{226}	—	October 8, 2002	Anderson Mesa	LONEOS	DOR	4.3 km	MPC · JPL
242085	2002 TT_{236}	—	October 6, 2002	Socorro	LINEAR	·	7.4 km	MPC · JPL
242086	2002 TY_{277}	—	October 10, 2002	Socorro	LINEAR	·	6.4 km	MPC · JPL
242087	2002 TQ_{279}	—	October 10, 2002	Socorro	LINEAR	·	6.0 km	MPC · JPL
242088	2002 TG_{290}	—	October 10, 2002	Socorro	LINEAR	H	1.0 km	MPC · JPL
242089	2002 TC_{293}	—	October 10, 2002	Socorro	LINEAR	·	3.2 km	MPC · JPL
242090	2002 TH_{295}	—	October 13, 2002	Palomar	NEAT	·	2.4 km	MPC · JPL
242091	2002 TW_{298}	—	October 12, 2002	Socorro	LINEAR	·	3.7 km	MPC · JPL
242092	2002 TK_{300}	—	October 15, 2002	Palomar	NEAT	·	3.7 km	MPC · JPL
242093	2002 TP_{356}	—	October 10, 2002	Apache Point	SDSS	EOS	4.0 km	MPC · JPL
242094	2002 TW_{359}	—	October 10, 2002	Apache Point	SDSS	·	2.5 km	MPC · JPL
242095	2002 TN_{376}	—	October 4, 2002	Apache Point	SDSS	·	3.7 km	MPC · JPL
242096	2002 UB_{9}	—	October 28, 2002	Palomar	NEAT	·	3.2 km	MPC · JPL
242097	2002 US_{16}	—	October 30, 2002	Haleakala	NEAT	·	1.9 km	MPC · JPL
242098	2002 UE_{23}	—	October 30, 2002	Haleakala	NEAT	LIX	8.2 km	MPC · JPL
242099	2002 UZ_{26}	—	October 31, 2002	Anderson Mesa	LONEOS	T_{j} (2.99)	6.0 km	MPC · JPL
242100	2002 UR_{34}	—	October 31, 2002	Anderson Mesa	LONEOS	·	5.2 km	MPC · JPL

== 242101–242200 ==
back to top

Designation			Discovery			Properties		Ref
Permanent	Provisional	Named after	Date	Site	Discoverer(s)	Category	Diam.	Ref
242101	2002 US_{35}	—	October 31, 2002	Palomar	NEAT	·	4.2 km	MPC · JPL
242102	2002 UZ_{40}	—	October 31, 2002	Palomar	NEAT	·	2.4 km	MPC · JPL
242103	2002 UL_{57}	—	October 29, 2002	Apache Point	SDSS	·	2.5 km	MPC · JPL
242104	2002 VR_{12}	—	November 4, 2002	Anderson Mesa	LONEOS	·	2.0 km	MPC · JPL
242105	2002 VN_{13}	—	November 4, 2002	Kitt Peak	Spacewatch	·	3.8 km	MPC · JPL
242106	2002 VJ_{29}	—	November 5, 2002	Socorro	LINEAR	·	5.7 km	MPC · JPL
242107	2002 VJ_{39}	—	November 5, 2002	Socorro	LINEAR	·	2.5 km	MPC · JPL
242108	2002 VO_{40}	—	November 6, 2002	Socorro	LINEAR	ADE	3.9 km	MPC · JPL
242109	2002 VL_{69}	—	November 8, 2002	Socorro	LINEAR	(5)	1.9 km	MPC · JPL
242110	2002 VW_{70}	—	November 7, 2002	Socorro	LINEAR	·	2.0 km	MPC · JPL
242111	2002 VU_{75}	—	November 7, 2002	Socorro	LINEAR	·	3.9 km	MPC · JPL
242112	2002 VO_{89}	—	November 11, 2002	Socorro	LINEAR	PHO	1.5 km	MPC · JPL
242113	2002 VN_{95}	—	November 11, 2002	Socorro	LINEAR	·	4.5 km	MPC · JPL
242114	2002 VO_{105}	—	November 12, 2002	Socorro	LINEAR	·	6.0 km	MPC · JPL
242115	2002 VV_{112}	—	November 13, 2002	Palomar	NEAT	·	2.4 km	MPC · JPL
242116	2002 VH_{129}	—	November 6, 2002	Socorro	LINEAR	(5)	2.5 km	MPC · JPL
242117	2002 VW_{135}	—	November 7, 2002	Kitt Peak	M. W. Buie	·	1.9 km	MPC · JPL
242118	2002 VG_{140}	—	November 13, 2002	Palomar	NEAT	·	2.5 km	MPC · JPL
242119	2002 VH_{143}	—	November 5, 2002	Palomar	NEAT	HYG	3.6 km	MPC · JPL
242120	2002 VR_{144}	—	November 4, 2002	Palomar	NEAT	·	4.0 km	MPC · JPL
242121	2002 WZ_{3}	—	November 24, 2002	Palomar	NEAT	·	2.5 km	MPC · JPL
242122	2002 WR_{12}	—	November 27, 2002	Anderson Mesa	LONEOS	·	4.4 km	MPC · JPL
242123	2002 WL_{17}	—	November 30, 2002	Socorro	LINEAR	·	2.1 km	MPC · JPL
242124	2002 WD_{18}	—	November 30, 2002	Socorro	LINEAR	·	3.3 km	MPC · JPL
242125	2002 WL_{18}	—	November 30, 2002	Socorro	LINEAR	·	2.0 km	MPC · JPL
242126	2002 XX_{10}	—	December 3, 2002	Palomar	NEAT	·	2.4 km	MPC · JPL
242127	2002 XK_{19}	—	December 2, 2002	Socorro	LINEAR	·	6.0 km	MPC · JPL
242128	2002 XA_{42}	—	December 6, 2002	Socorro	LINEAR	·	8.1 km	MPC · JPL
242129	2002 XN_{45}	—	December 10, 2002	Socorro	LINEAR	·	1.8 km	MPC · JPL
242130	2002 XM_{49}	—	December 10, 2002	Socorro	LINEAR	·	6.4 km	MPC · JPL
242131	2002 XM_{66}	—	December 10, 2002	Socorro	LINEAR	·	2.5 km	MPC · JPL
242132	2002 XO_{71}	—	December 10, 2002	Palomar	NEAT	URS	5.6 km	MPC · JPL
242133	2002 YG_{8}	—	December 31, 2002	Anderson Mesa	LONEOS	T_{j} (2.98) · EUP	6.9 km	MPC · JPL
242134	2002 YA_{23}	—	December 31, 2002	Socorro	LINEAR	·	5.6 km	MPC · JPL
242135	2003 AQ_{4}	—	January 1, 2003	Kingsnake	J. V. McClusky	·	4.9 km	MPC · JPL
242136	2003 AX_{20}	—	January 5, 2003	Socorro	LINEAR	HYG	3.3 km	MPC · JPL
242137	2003 AO_{23}	—	January 4, 2003	Socorro	LINEAR	·	3.1 km	MPC · JPL
242138	2003 AU_{31}	—	January 5, 2003	Socorro	LINEAR	·	3.0 km	MPC · JPL
242139	2003 AW_{56}	—	January 5, 2003	Socorro	LINEAR	·	4.7 km	MPC · JPL
242140	2003 AP_{66}	—	January 7, 2003	Socorro	LINEAR	·	6.6 km	MPC · JPL
242141	2003 AY_{93}	—	January 15, 2003	Palomar	NEAT	·	4.1 km	MPC · JPL
242142	2003 AG_{94}	—	January 7, 2003	Socorro	LINEAR	·	2.1 km	MPC · JPL
242143	2003 BX	—	January 24, 2003	Palomar	NEAT	PHO	1.7 km	MPC · JPL
242144	2003 BS_{26}	—	January 26, 2003	Anderson Mesa	LONEOS	·	3.6 km	MPC · JPL
242145	2003 BX_{59}	—	January 27, 2003	Haleakala	NEAT	·	3.7 km	MPC · JPL
242146	2003 BM_{83}	—	January 31, 2003	Socorro	LINEAR	·	5.2 km	MPC · JPL
242147	2003 BH_{84}	—	January 25, 2003	La Silla	A. Boattini, H. Scholl	APO +1km	1.7 km	MPC · JPL
242148	2003 CR_{4}	—	February 1, 2003	Anderson Mesa	LONEOS	T_{j} (2.99) · HIL · 3:2	3.9 km	MPC · JPL
242149	2003 CP_{5}	—	February 1, 2003	Socorro	LINEAR	T_{j} (2.99) · HIL · 3:2	5.9 km	MPC · JPL
242150	2003 CW_{9}	—	February 2, 2003	Socorro	LINEAR	·	4.3 km	MPC · JPL
242151	2003 CF_{15}	—	February 4, 2003	Socorro	LINEAR	(45637) · CYB	6.0 km	MPC · JPL
242152	2003 DR_{1}	—	February 21, 2003	Palomar	NEAT	·	3.2 km	MPC · JPL
242153	2003 DH_{10}	—	February 23, 2003	Črni Vrh	Mikuž, H.	PHO	1.6 km	MPC · JPL
242154	2003 EA_{27}	—	March 6, 2003	Anderson Mesa	LONEOS	·	1.0 km	MPC · JPL
242155	2003 EV_{38}	—	March 8, 2003	Anderson Mesa	LONEOS	·	3.4 km	MPC · JPL
242156	2003 EA_{41}	—	March 8, 2003	Palomar	NEAT	·	5.0 km	MPC · JPL
242157	2003 FV	—	March 20, 2003	Palomar	NEAT	PHO	1.2 km	MPC · JPL
242158	2003 FZ_{8}	—	March 31, 2003	Palomar	NEAT	T_{j} (2.99)	7.1 km	MPC · JPL
242159	2003 FK_{28}	—	March 24, 2003	Haleakala	NEAT	T_{j} (2.98) · HIL · 3:2	10 km	MPC · JPL
242160	2003 FO_{36}	—	March 23, 2003	Kitt Peak	Spacewatch	·	5.7 km	MPC · JPL
242161	2003 FO_{42}	—	March 23, 2003	Kitt Peak	Spacewatch	·	5.8 km	MPC · JPL
242162	2003 FD_{88}	—	March 28, 2003	Kitt Peak	Spacewatch	·	930 m	MPC · JPL
242163	2003 FB_{94}	—	March 29, 2003	Anderson Mesa	LONEOS	·	3.4 km	MPC · JPL
242164	2003 FF_{98}	—	March 30, 2003	Kitt Peak	Spacewatch	EOS	3.8 km	MPC · JPL
242165	2003 FJ_{102}	—	March 31, 2003	Anderson Mesa	LONEOS	·	1.5 km	MPC · JPL
242166	2003 FJ_{103}	—	March 24, 2003	Kitt Peak	Spacewatch	KON	2.9 km	MPC · JPL
242167	2003 FA_{107}	—	March 29, 2003	Anderson Mesa	LONEOS	·	890 m	MPC · JPL
242168	2003 GY_{10}	—	April 1, 2003	Socorro	LINEAR	·	1.5 km	MPC · JPL
242169	2003 GD_{17}	—	April 5, 2003	Haleakala	NEAT	·	1.3 km	MPC · JPL
242170	2003 GD_{49}	—	April 9, 2003	Kitt Peak	Spacewatch	·	1.4 km	MPC · JPL
242171	2003 GG_{51}	—	April 8, 2003	Haleakala	NEAT	·	5.5 km	MPC · JPL
242172	2003 GH_{53}	—	April 12, 2003	Uccle	T. Pauwels	·	1.1 km	MPC · JPL
242173	2003 GT_{55}	—	April 7, 2003	Socorro	LINEAR	·	780 m	MPC · JPL
242174	2003 HK_{2}	—	April 25, 2003	Socorro	LINEAR	T_{j} (2.98)	7.3 km	MPC · JPL
242175	2003 HY_{14}	—	April 26, 2003	Haleakala	NEAT	·	810 m	MPC · JPL
242176	2003 HX_{19}	—	April 26, 2003	Haleakala	NEAT	·	3.6 km	MPC · JPL
242177	2003 HN_{24}	—	April 25, 2003	Kitt Peak	Spacewatch	L4	10 km	MPC · JPL
242178	2003 HV_{31}	—	April 28, 2003	Socorro	LINEAR	HIL · 3:2 · (6124)	7.0 km	MPC · JPL
242179	2003 HB_{46}	—	April 27, 2003	Anderson Mesa	LONEOS	V	1.0 km	MPC · JPL
242180	2003 HO_{46}	—	April 28, 2003	Socorro	LINEAR	·	1.3 km	MPC · JPL
242181	2003 HS_{47}	—	April 29, 2003	Kitt Peak	Spacewatch	·	2.9 km	MPC · JPL
242182	2003 HQ_{52}	—	April 29, 2003	Anderson Mesa	LONEOS	·	1.1 km	MPC · JPL
242183	2003 HJ_{54}	—	April 24, 2003	Anderson Mesa	LONEOS	·	7.1 km	MPC · JPL
242184	2003 HY_{54}	—	April 25, 2003	Campo Imperatore	CINEOS	·	3.8 km	MPC · JPL
242185	2003 JV_{1}	—	May 1, 2003	Kitt Peak	Spacewatch	·	3.1 km	MPC · JPL
242186	2003 KO_{9}	—	May 25, 2003	Reedy Creek	J. Broughton	·	1.5 km	MPC · JPL
242187	2003 KR_{18}	—	May 30, 2003	Socorro	LINEAR	AMO +1km	600 m	MPC · JPL
242188	2003 MO_{2}	—	June 25, 2003	Palomar	NEAT	·	1.5 km	MPC · JPL
242189	2003 MM_{5}	—	June 26, 2003	Socorro	LINEAR	·	2.1 km	MPC · JPL
242190	2003 MB_{13}	—	June 23, 2003	Anderson Mesa	LONEOS	·	1.9 km	MPC · JPL
242191	2003 NZ_{6}	—	July 9, 2003	Socorro	LINEAR	ATE	370 m	MPC · JPL
242192	2003 NU_{12}	—	July 1, 2003	Socorro	LINEAR	·	1.6 km	MPC · JPL
242193	2003 OU_{1}	—	July 21, 2003	Campo Imperatore	CINEOS	·	4.4 km	MPC · JPL
242194	2003 OS_{19}	—	July 30, 2003	Campo Imperatore	CINEOS	KON	4.0 km	MPC · JPL
242195	2003 PC_{6}	—	August 1, 2003	Socorro	LINEAR	HYG	5.0 km	MPC · JPL
242196	2003 PT_{9}	—	August 1, 2003	Socorro	LINEAR	·	2.3 km	MPC · JPL
242197	2003 PJ_{11}	—	August 4, 2003	Needville	J. Dellinger	·	3.6 km	MPC · JPL
242198	2003 QJ_{12}	—	August 22, 2003	Haleakala	NEAT	·	1.4 km	MPC · JPL
242199	2003 QF_{16}	—	August 20, 2003	Palomar	NEAT	·	2.1 km	MPC · JPL
242200	2003 QA_{19}	—	August 22, 2003	Socorro	LINEAR	·	1.7 km	MPC · JPL

== 242201–242300 ==
back to top

Designation			Discovery			Properties		Ref
Permanent	Provisional	Named after	Date	Site	Discoverer(s)	Category	Diam.	Ref
242201	2003 QC_{19}	—	August 22, 2003	Socorro	LINEAR	·	2.8 km	MPC · JPL
242202	2003 QE_{20}	—	August 22, 2003	Palomar	NEAT	ERI	2.4 km	MPC · JPL
242203	2003 QA_{25}	—	August 22, 2003	Palomar	NEAT	·	1.9 km	MPC · JPL
242204	2003 QC_{27}	—	August 22, 2003	Campo Imperatore	CINEOS	·	1.8 km	MPC · JPL
242205	2003 QX_{31}	—	August 21, 2003	Palomar	NEAT	NYS	1.4 km	MPC · JPL
242206	2003 QS_{36}	—	August 22, 2003	Socorro	LINEAR	(2076)	1.5 km	MPC · JPL
242207	2003 QS_{39}	—	August 22, 2003	Socorro	LINEAR	·	1.6 km	MPC · JPL
242208	2003 QY_{65}	—	August 25, 2003	Socorro	LINEAR	·	1.9 km	MPC · JPL
242209	2003 QH_{71}	—	August 23, 2003	Palomar	NEAT	·	2.1 km	MPC · JPL
242210	2003 QT_{78}	—	August 24, 2003	Socorro	LINEAR	·	2.0 km	MPC · JPL
242211	2003 QB_{90}	—	August 26, 2003	Socorro	LINEAR	AMO +1km	820 m	MPC · JPL
242212	2003 QZ_{105}	—	August 30, 2003	Kitt Peak	Spacewatch	·	7.3 km	MPC · JPL
242213	2003 QJ_{114}	—	August 22, 2003	Haleakala	NEAT	·	5.8 km	MPC · JPL
242214	2003 RS_{4}	—	September 3, 2003	Socorro	LINEAR	PHO	1.4 km	MPC · JPL
242215	2003 RA_{10}	—	September 5, 2003	Essen	Payer, T.	·	1.4 km	MPC · JPL
242216	2003 RN_{10}	—	September 13, 2003	Anderson Mesa	LONEOS	AMO +1km · PHA	2.7 km	MPC · JPL
242217	2003 RJ_{13}	—	September 15, 2003	Palomar	NEAT	(21885)	4.0 km	MPC · JPL
242218	2003 RS_{16}	—	September 14, 2003	Haleakala	NEAT	·	3.9 km	MPC · JPL
242219	2003 RZ_{22}	—	September 15, 2003	Palomar	NEAT	MAS	850 m	MPC · JPL
242220	2003 RM_{24}	—	September 15, 2003	Anderson Mesa	LONEOS	EUP	5.0 km	MPC · JPL
242221	2003 SL_{3}	—	September 16, 2003	Palomar	NEAT	·	2.1 km	MPC · JPL
242222	2003 SQ_{14}	—	September 17, 2003	Kitt Peak	Spacewatch	·	3.0 km	MPC · JPL
242223	2003 SR_{24}	—	September 17, 2003	Socorro	LINEAR	·	3.0 km	MPC · JPL
242224	2003 SV_{45}	—	September 16, 2003	Anderson Mesa	LONEOS	NYS	1.4 km	MPC · JPL
242225	2003 SE_{51}	—	September 18, 2003	Palomar	NEAT	VER	5.0 km	MPC · JPL
242226	2003 SY_{75}	—	September 18, 2003	Kitt Peak	Spacewatch	·	1.6 km	MPC · JPL
242227	2003 SC_{77}	—	September 19, 2003	Kitt Peak	Spacewatch	·	2.1 km	MPC · JPL
242228	2003 SN_{80}	—	September 19, 2003	Haleakala	NEAT	·	5.7 km	MPC · JPL
242229	2003 SW_{87}	—	September 17, 2003	Haleakala	NEAT	V	920 m	MPC · JPL
242230	2003 SZ_{96}	—	September 19, 2003	Palomar	NEAT	·	4.9 km	MPC · JPL
242231	2003 SA_{103}	—	September 20, 2003	Kitt Peak	Spacewatch	·	5.0 km	MPC · JPL
242232	2003 SJ_{118}	—	September 16, 2003	Palomar	NEAT	·	4.2 km	MPC · JPL
242233	2003 SV_{119}	—	September 17, 2003	Kitt Peak	Spacewatch	·	1.2 km	MPC · JPL
242234	2003 SL_{129}	—	September 20, 2003	Črni Vrh	Skvarč, J.	·	3.3 km	MPC · JPL
242235 Marieskálová	2003 SM_{129}	Marieskálová	September 20, 2003	Kleť	Kleť	·	4.1 km	MPC · JPL
242236	2003 SE_{140}	—	September 19, 2003	Campo Imperatore	CINEOS	·	3.2 km	MPC · JPL
242237	2003 SW_{148}	—	September 16, 2003	Kitt Peak	Spacewatch	·	1.7 km	MPC · JPL
242238	2003 SW_{157}	—	September 20, 2003	Socorro	LINEAR	·	2.9 km	MPC · JPL
242239	2003 SE_{165}	—	September 20, 2003	Anderson Mesa	LONEOS	·	3.9 km	MPC · JPL
242240	2003 SA_{174}	—	September 18, 2003	Socorro	LINEAR	·	5.9 km	MPC · JPL
242241	2003 SG_{179}	—	September 19, 2003	Palomar	NEAT	·	3.6 km	MPC · JPL
242242	2003 SK_{180}	—	September 19, 2003	Kitt Peak	Spacewatch	·	1.8 km	MPC · JPL
242243	2003 SB_{207}	—	September 26, 2003	Socorro	LINEAR	·	4.6 km	MPC · JPL
242244	2003 SW_{217}	—	September 28, 2003	Emerald Lane	L. Ball	·	3.1 km	MPC · JPL
242245	2003 SJ_{220}	—	September 27, 2003	Kitt Peak	Spacewatch	·	6.4 km	MPC · JPL
242246	2003 SN_{222}	—	September 28, 2003	Desert Eagle	W. K. Y. Yeung	NYS ·	2.5 km	MPC · JPL
242247	2003 SC_{226}	—	September 26, 2003	Socorro	LINEAR	·	2.3 km	MPC · JPL
242248	2003 ST_{233}	—	September 25, 2003	Palomar	NEAT	·	1.9 km	MPC · JPL
242249	2003 SV_{244}	—	September 26, 2003	Socorro	LINEAR	·	1.4 km	MPC · JPL
242250	2003 SP_{248}	—	September 26, 2003	Socorro	LINEAR	·	2.6 km	MPC · JPL
242251	2003 SU_{252}	—	September 26, 2003	Desert Eagle	W. K. Y. Yeung	526	3.5 km	MPC · JPL
242252	2003 SQ_{258}	—	September 28, 2003	Kitt Peak	Spacewatch	·	1.4 km	MPC · JPL
242253	2003 SD_{261}	—	September 27, 2003	Socorro	LINEAR	SUL	2.6 km	MPC · JPL
242254	2003 SC_{269}	—	September 25, 2003	Uccle	T. Pauwels	·	6.5 km	MPC · JPL
242255	2003 SF_{270}	—	September 24, 2003	Haleakala	NEAT	·	1.2 km	MPC · JPL
242256	2003 SC_{282}	—	September 19, 2003	Anderson Mesa	LONEOS	·	1.7 km	MPC · JPL
242257	2003 SU_{283}	—	September 20, 2003	Socorro	LINEAR	·	1.6 km	MPC · JPL
242258	2003 SY_{296}	—	September 16, 2003	Palomar	NEAT	·	3.3 km	MPC · JPL
242259	2003 SS_{298}	—	September 18, 2003	Haleakala	NEAT	EUN	2.2 km	MPC · JPL
242260	2003 SE_{301}	—	September 17, 2003	Palomar	NEAT	·	3.8 km	MPC · JPL
242261	2003 SM_{312}	—	September 16, 2003	Haleakala	NEAT	·	1.3 km	MPC · JPL
242262	2003 SY_{321}	—	September 26, 2003	Socorro	LINEAR	·	2.6 km	MPC · JPL
242263	2003 SN_{322}	—	September 30, 2003	Socorro	LINEAR	·	4.8 km	MPC · JPL
242264	2003 SY_{327}	—	September 19, 2003	Campo Imperatore	CINEOS	·	1.5 km	MPC · JPL
242265	2003 SO_{332}	—	September 28, 2003	Socorro	LINEAR	·	2.4 km	MPC · JPL
242266	2003 SD_{389}	—	September 26, 2003	Apache Point	SDSS	·	1.9 km	MPC · JPL
242267	2003 TF_{3}	—	October 1, 2003	Kitt Peak	Spacewatch	·	2.7 km	MPC · JPL
242268	2003 TJ_{38}	—	October 2, 2003	Kitt Peak	Spacewatch	·	2.9 km	MPC · JPL
242269	2003 TN_{51}	—	October 5, 2003	Socorro	LINEAR	·	5.0 km	MPC · JPL
242270	2003 TJ_{55}	—	October 5, 2003	Kitt Peak	Spacewatch	·	6.4 km	MPC · JPL
242271	2003 UT_{13}	—	October 21, 2003	Socorro	LINEAR	H	730 m	MPC · JPL
242272	2003 UE_{38}	—	October 17, 2003	Kitt Peak	Spacewatch	(7744)	2.1 km	MPC · JPL
242273	2003 US_{42}	—	October 17, 2003	Kitt Peak	Spacewatch	VER	4.5 km	MPC · JPL
242274	2003 UA_{53}	—	October 18, 2003	Palomar	NEAT	ADE	4.4 km	MPC · JPL
242275	2003 UH_{53}	—	October 18, 2003	Palomar	NEAT	·	4.1 km	MPC · JPL
242276	2003 UW_{63}	—	October 16, 2003	Anderson Mesa	LONEOS	·	4.6 km	MPC · JPL
242277	2003 UZ_{67}	—	October 16, 2003	Palomar	NEAT	·	4.3 km	MPC · JPL
242278	2003 UN_{82}	—	October 19, 2003	Socorro	LINEAR	PHO	3.5 km	MPC · JPL
242279	2003 UK_{90}	—	October 20, 2003	Kitt Peak	Spacewatch	THM	4.1 km	MPC · JPL
242280	2003 UC_{100}	—	October 19, 2003	Palomar	NEAT	ADE	2.9 km	MPC · JPL
242281	2003 UD_{100}	—	October 19, 2003	Palomar	NEAT	DOR	4.9 km	MPC · JPL
242282	2003 UT_{126}	—	October 20, 2003	Palomar	NEAT	·	2.3 km	MPC · JPL
242283	2003 UO_{127}	—	October 21, 2003	Kitt Peak	Spacewatch	·	4.1 km	MPC · JPL
242284	2003 US_{133}	—	October 20, 2003	Socorro	LINEAR	·	4.5 km	MPC · JPL
242285	2003 UJ_{141}	—	October 18, 2003	Anderson Mesa	LONEOS	·	3.3 km	MPC · JPL
242286	2003 US_{148}	—	October 19, 2003	Kitt Peak	Spacewatch	·	1.8 km	MPC · JPL
242287	2003 UW_{155}	—	October 20, 2003	Kitt Peak	Spacewatch	·	3.7 km	MPC · JPL
242288	2003 UY_{157}	—	October 20, 2003	Palomar	NEAT	VER	4.0 km	MPC · JPL
242289	2003 UA_{174}	—	October 21, 2003	Kitt Peak	Spacewatch	·	6.8 km	MPC · JPL
242290	2003 UK_{189}	—	October 22, 2003	Kitt Peak	Spacewatch	HIL · 3:2	7.9 km	MPC · JPL
242291	2003 UA_{198}	—	October 21, 2003	Anderson Mesa	LONEOS	·	1.3 km	MPC · JPL
242292	2003 UU_{218}	—	October 21, 2003	Socorro	LINEAR	·	1.8 km	MPC · JPL
242293	2003 UY_{280}	—	October 28, 2003	Socorro	LINEAR	·	2.9 km	MPC · JPL
242294	2003 UV_{289}	—	October 23, 2003	Kitt Peak	M. W. Buie	·	2.7 km	MPC · JPL
242295	2003 UP_{294}	—	October 16, 2003	Kitt Peak	Spacewatch	·	4.6 km	MPC · JPL
242296	2003 UH_{299}	—	October 16, 2003	Kitt Peak	Spacewatch	HOF	3.1 km	MPC · JPL
242297	2003 US_{345}	—	October 19, 2003	Apache Point	SDSS	·	3.6 km	MPC · JPL
242298	2003 UT_{348}	—	October 19, 2003	Apache Point	SDSS	AEO	2.2 km	MPC · JPL
242299	2003 UU_{371}	—	October 22, 2003	Apache Point	SDSS	EUN	3.8 km	MPC · JPL
242300	2003 WG_{22}	—	November 19, 2003	Palomar	NEAT	·	3.4 km	MPC · JPL

== 242301–242400 ==
back to top

Designation			Discovery			Properties		Ref
Permanent	Provisional	Named after	Date	Site	Discoverer(s)	Category	Diam.	Ref
242301	2003 WD_{27}	—	November 16, 2003	Kitt Peak	Spacewatch	·	4.1 km	MPC · JPL
242302	2003 WV_{29}	—	November 18, 2003	Kitt Peak	Spacewatch	·	2.6 km	MPC · JPL
242303	2003 WM_{58}	—	November 18, 2003	Kitt Peak	Spacewatch	·	4.8 km	MPC · JPL
242304	2003 WL_{70}	—	November 20, 2003	Kitt Peak	Spacewatch	EUP	6.0 km	MPC · JPL
242305	2003 WR_{72}	—	November 20, 2003	Socorro	LINEAR	T_{j} (2.98) · 3:2	5.8 km	MPC · JPL
242306	2003 WR_{78}	—	November 20, 2003	Socorro	LINEAR	·	2.4 km	MPC · JPL
242307	2003 WC_{80}	—	November 20, 2003	Socorro	LINEAR	·	2.9 km	MPC · JPL
242308	2003 WA_{89}	—	November 16, 2003	Catalina	CSS	·	2.1 km	MPC · JPL
242309	2003 WG_{90}	—	November 16, 2003	Kitt Peak	Spacewatch	3:2	7.1 km	MPC · JPL
242310	2003 WN_{97}	—	November 19, 2003	Anderson Mesa	LONEOS	·	3.1 km	MPC · JPL
242311	2003 WX_{103}	—	November 21, 2003	Socorro	LINEAR	T_{j} (2.98) · 3:2	5.8 km	MPC · JPL
242312	2003 WU_{104}	—	November 21, 2003	Socorro	LINEAR	·	4.2 km	MPC · JPL
242313	2003 WF_{116}	—	November 20, 2003	Socorro	LINEAR	BRA	2.9 km	MPC · JPL
242314	2003 WF_{125}	—	November 20, 2003	Socorro	LINEAR	·	4.1 km	MPC · JPL
242315	2003 WR_{125}	—	November 20, 2003	Socorro	LINEAR	·	5.4 km	MPC · JPL
242316	2003 WH_{141}	—	November 21, 2003	Socorro	LINEAR	·	1.8 km	MPC · JPL
242317	2003 WW_{141}	—	November 21, 2003	Socorro	LINEAR	·	5.5 km	MPC · JPL
242318	2003 WR_{153}	—	November 28, 2003	Anderson Mesa	LONEOS	·	7.7 km	MPC · JPL
242319	2003 WA_{167}	—	November 18, 2003	Kitt Peak	Spacewatch	·	2.0 km	MPC · JPL
242320	2003 WH_{168}	—	November 19, 2003	Palomar	NEAT	·	2.8 km	MPC · JPL
242321 Billtilden	2003 WB_{170}	Billtilden	November 20, 2003	Catalina	CSS	T_{j} (2.96) · 3:2	6.3 km	MPC · JPL
242322	2003 WO_{172}	—	November 30, 2003	Kitt Peak	Spacewatch	KON	3.1 km	MPC · JPL
242323	2003 YE_{12}	—	December 17, 2003	Socorro	LINEAR	·	2.3 km	MPC · JPL
242324	2003 YY_{12}	—	December 17, 2003	Anderson Mesa	LONEOS	ERI	2.5 km	MPC · JPL
242325	2003 YF_{23}	—	December 17, 2003	Anderson Mesa	LONEOS	BRA	2.2 km	MPC · JPL
242326	2003 YQ_{27}	—	December 17, 2003	Kitt Peak	Spacewatch	·	4.4 km	MPC · JPL
242327	2003 YD_{32}	—	December 18, 2003	Socorro	LINEAR	·	2.2 km	MPC · JPL
242328	2003 YH_{32}	—	December 18, 2003	Socorro	LINEAR	·	5.6 km	MPC · JPL
242329	2003 YL_{33}	—	December 16, 2003	Anderson Mesa	LONEOS	·	3.5 km	MPC · JPL
242330	2003 YP_{33}	—	December 17, 2003	Kitt Peak	Spacewatch	·	3.1 km	MPC · JPL
242331	2003 YS_{56}	—	December 19, 2003	Socorro	LINEAR	·	3.2 km	MPC · JPL
242332	2003 YJ_{62}	—	December 19, 2003	Socorro	LINEAR	·	3.1 km	MPC · JPL
242333	2003 YA_{70}	—	December 21, 2003	Socorro	LINEAR	·	6.7 km	MPC · JPL
242334	2003 YP_{73}	—	December 18, 2003	Socorro	LINEAR	·	5.3 km	MPC · JPL
242335	2003 YB_{74}	—	December 18, 2003	Socorro	LINEAR	·	2.5 km	MPC · JPL
242336	2003 YN_{103}	—	December 20, 2003	Socorro	LINEAR	·	5.6 km	MPC · JPL
242337	2003 YB_{106}	—	December 22, 2003	Socorro	LINEAR	·	2.7 km	MPC · JPL
242338	2003 YS_{114}	—	December 25, 2003	Haleakala	NEAT	·	4.0 km	MPC · JPL
242339	2003 YX_{115}	—	December 27, 2003	Catalina	CSS	·	4.2 km	MPC · JPL
242340	2003 YV_{128}	—	December 27, 2003	Socorro	LINEAR	·	3.7 km	MPC · JPL
242341	2003 YN_{139}	—	December 28, 2003	Socorro	LINEAR	·	5.6 km	MPC · JPL
242342	2003 YL_{159}	—	December 17, 2003	Socorro	LINEAR	·	2.8 km	MPC · JPL
242343	2003 YU_{164}	—	December 17, 2003	Kitt Peak	Spacewatch	·	3.2 km	MPC · JPL
242344	2004 AW_{8}	—	January 14, 2004	Palomar	NEAT	EOS	3.4 km	MPC · JPL
242345	2004 AB_{10}	—	January 15, 2004	Kitt Peak	Spacewatch	·	3.4 km	MPC · JPL
242346	2004 BH_{2}	—	January 16, 2004	Palomar	NEAT	·	5.4 km	MPC · JPL
242347	2004 BO_{2}	—	January 16, 2004	Palomar	NEAT	·	4.6 km	MPC · JPL
242348	2004 BU_{21}	—	January 19, 2004	Anderson Mesa	LONEOS	·	4.0 km	MPC · JPL
242349	2004 BB_{33}	—	January 19, 2004	Kitt Peak	Spacewatch	·	3.2 km	MPC · JPL
242350	2004 BM_{38}	—	January 20, 2004	Socorro	LINEAR	RAF	1.9 km	MPC · JPL
242351	2004 BB_{66}	—	January 22, 2004	Socorro	LINEAR	(5)	2.1 km	MPC · JPL
242352	2004 BJ_{72}	—	January 23, 2004	Socorro	LINEAR	LIX	5.2 km	MPC · JPL
242353	2004 BL_{83}	—	January 28, 2004	Socorro	LINEAR	EUP	4.9 km	MPC · JPL
242354	2004 BP_{86}	—	January 28, 2004	Catalina	CSS	·	2.8 km	MPC · JPL
242355	2004 BQ_{86}	—	January 28, 2004	Catalina	CSS	·	3.7 km	MPC · JPL
242356	2004 BK_{88}	—	January 23, 2004	Socorro	LINEAR	·	2.5 km	MPC · JPL
242357	2004 BA_{99}	—	January 27, 2004	Kitt Peak	Spacewatch	·	3.9 km	MPC · JPL
242358	2004 BR_{103}	—	January 29, 2004	Anderson Mesa	LONEOS	·	4.4 km	MPC · JPL
242359	2004 BV_{144}	—	January 19, 2004	Socorro	LINEAR	JUN	2.1 km	MPC · JPL
242360	2004 BV_{145}	—	January 21, 2004	Socorro	LINEAR	·	4.3 km	MPC · JPL
242361	2004 BZ_{149}	—	January 17, 2004	Palomar	NEAT	·	4.2 km	MPC · JPL
242362	2004 BR_{150}	—	January 17, 2004	Haleakala	NEAT	EOS	3.5 km	MPC · JPL
242363	2004 CP_{14}	—	February 11, 2004	Palomar	NEAT	·	3.2 km	MPC · JPL
242364	2004 CX_{26}	—	February 11, 2004	Anderson Mesa	LONEOS	·	4.5 km	MPC · JPL
242365	2004 CM_{27}	—	February 11, 2004	Palomar	NEAT	·	2.3 km	MPC · JPL
242366	2004 CP_{29}	—	February 12, 2004	Kitt Peak	Spacewatch	KOR	1.7 km	MPC · JPL
242367	2004 CK_{32}	—	February 12, 2004	Kitt Peak	Spacewatch	·	2.4 km	MPC · JPL
242368	2004 CN_{36}	—	February 12, 2004	Kitt Peak	Spacewatch	·	2.3 km	MPC · JPL
242369	2004 CC_{60}	—	February 11, 2004	Anderson Mesa	LONEOS	·	2.5 km	MPC · JPL
242370	2004 CM_{74}	—	February 11, 2004	Palomar	NEAT	3:2	7.4 km	MPC · JPL
242371	2004 CO_{82}	—	February 12, 2004	Kitt Peak	Spacewatch	·	6.7 km	MPC · JPL
242372	2004 CV_{93}	—	February 11, 2004	Palomar	NEAT	·	5.9 km	MPC · JPL
242373	2004 CC_{103}	—	February 12, 2004	Palomar	NEAT	EUP	5.7 km	MPC · JPL
242374	2004 CV_{107}	—	February 14, 2004	Kitt Peak	Spacewatch	LIX	3.5 km	MPC · JPL
242375	2004 CF_{120}	—	February 12, 2004	Kitt Peak	Spacewatch	THM	4.1 km	MPC · JPL
242376	2004 DT_{30}	—	February 17, 2004	Socorro	LINEAR	·	3.6 km	MPC · JPL
242377	2004 DY_{35}	—	February 19, 2004	Socorro	LINEAR	·	3.0 km	MPC · JPL
242378	2004 DL_{40}	—	February 22, 2004	Kitt Peak	Spacewatch	EOS ·	4.1 km	MPC · JPL
242379	2004 DP_{49}	—	February 20, 2004	Haleakala	NEAT	LIX	4.7 km	MPC · JPL
242380	2004 DL_{58}	—	February 23, 2004	Socorro	LINEAR	·	4.2 km	MPC · JPL
242381	2004 DP_{58}	—	February 23, 2004	Socorro	LINEAR	·	3.7 km	MPC · JPL
242382	2004 DG_{60}	—	February 26, 2004	Socorro	LINEAR	EUP	6.4 km	MPC · JPL
242383	2004 EX_{1}	—	March 11, 2004	Palomar	NEAT	·	3.9 km	MPC · JPL
242384	2004 EN_{16}	—	March 12, 2004	Palomar	NEAT	·	5.2 km	MPC · JPL
242385	2004 EM_{25}	—	March 13, 2004	Palomar	NEAT	·	2.3 km	MPC · JPL
242386	2004 EK_{34}	—	March 12, 2004	Palomar	NEAT	·	3.1 km	MPC · JPL
242387	2004 EY_{56}	—	March 15, 2004	Kitt Peak	Spacewatch	·	5.5 km	MPC · JPL
242388	2004 ER_{65}	—	March 14, 2004	Socorro	LINEAR	·	5.1 km	MPC · JPL
242389	2004 EA_{94}	—	March 15, 2004	Socorro	LINEAR	·	3.7 km	MPC · JPL
242390	2004 EZ_{102}	—	March 15, 2004	Kitt Peak	Spacewatch	·	1.7 km	MPC · JPL
242391	2004 EY_{107}	—	March 15, 2004	Kitt Peak	Spacewatch	KON	2.7 km	MPC · JPL
242392	2004 FA_{9}	—	March 16, 2004	Socorro	LINEAR	EOS	2.8 km	MPC · JPL
242393	2004 FO_{18}	—	March 26, 2004	Kitt Peak	Deep Lens Survey	HYG	4.9 km	MPC · JPL
242394	2004 FA_{40}	—	March 18, 2004	Socorro	LINEAR	NYS ·	2.6 km	MPC · JPL
242395	2004 FU_{43}	—	March 16, 2004	Kitt Peak	Spacewatch	·	4.4 km	MPC · JPL
242396	2004 FN_{45}	—	March 16, 2004	Socorro	LINEAR	·	4.4 km	MPC · JPL
242397	2004 FD_{46}	—	March 17, 2004	Socorro	LINEAR	·	4.6 km	MPC · JPL
242398	2004 FP_{85}	—	March 18, 2004	Kitt Peak	Spacewatch	·	3.7 km	MPC · JPL
242399	2004 FZ_{86}	—	March 19, 2004	Palomar	NEAT	·	4.4 km	MPC · JPL
242400	2004 FR_{104}	—	March 23, 2004	Socorro	LINEAR	EOS	2.8 km	MPC · JPL

== 242401–242500 ==
back to top

Designation			Discovery			Properties		Ref
Permanent	Provisional	Named after	Date	Site	Discoverer(s)	Category	Diam.	Ref
242401	2004 FV_{104}	—	March 23, 2004	Socorro	LINEAR	EMA	5.0 km	MPC · JPL
242402	2004 FC_{108}	—	March 23, 2004	Socorro	LINEAR	·	3.8 km	MPC · JPL
242403	2004 FU_{112}	—	March 26, 2004	Catalina	CSS	·	3.2 km	MPC · JPL
242404	2004 FP_{122}	—	March 26, 2004	Socorro	LINEAR	·	4.4 km	MPC · JPL
242405	2004 FY_{136}	—	March 28, 2004	Socorro	LINEAR	TIR	4.6 km	MPC · JPL
242406	2004 FT_{147}	—	March 16, 2004	Palomar	NEAT	·	5.0 km	MPC · JPL
242407	2004 FJ_{148}	—	March 26, 2004	Kitt Peak	Spacewatch	·	4.7 km	MPC · JPL
242408	2004 FY_{156}	—	March 17, 2004	Kitt Peak	Spacewatch	·	4.4 km	MPC · JPL
242409	2004 GX_{5}	—	April 12, 2004	Palomar	NEAT	·	3.5 km	MPC · JPL
242410	2004 GB_{12}	—	April 12, 2004	Catalina	CSS	T_{j} (2.99) · EUP	5.6 km	MPC · JPL
242411	2004 GA_{13}	—	April 11, 2004	Palomar	NEAT	·	3.6 km	MPC · JPL
242412	2004 GM_{13}	—	April 13, 2004	Palomar	NEAT	·	3.5 km	MPC · JPL
242413	2004 GH_{15}	—	April 14, 2004	Socorro	LINEAR	·	5.0 km	MPC · JPL
242414	2004 GJ_{28}	—	April 14, 2004	Socorro	LINEAR	·	5.0 km	MPC · JPL
242415	2004 GX_{28}	—	April 14, 2004	Goodricke-Pigott	Reddy, V.	LIX	4.3 km	MPC · JPL
242416	2004 GW_{33}	—	April 12, 2004	Palomar	NEAT	·	3.8 km	MPC · JPL
242417	2004 GY_{41}	—	April 14, 2004	Anderson Mesa	LONEOS	·	3.0 km	MPC · JPL
242418	2004 GV_{73}	—	April 11, 2004	Bergisch Gladbach	W. Bickel	EOS	2.6 km	MPC · JPL
242419	2004 HJ_{19}	—	April 19, 2004	Socorro	LINEAR	·	3.6 km	MPC · JPL
242420	2004 HJ_{25}	—	April 19, 2004	Socorro	LINEAR	·	4.5 km	MPC · JPL
242421	2004 HB_{38}	—	April 23, 2004	Kitt Peak	Spacewatch	·	3.1 km	MPC · JPL
242422	2004 HW_{60}	—	April 20, 2004	Socorro	LINEAR	·	4.0 km	MPC · JPL
242423	2004 HH_{66}	—	April 20, 2004	Kitt Peak	Spacewatch	·	4.6 km	MPC · JPL
242424	2004 JO_{42}	—	May 15, 2004	Socorro	LINEAR	·	2.6 km	MPC · JPL
242425	2004 LC_{16}	—	June 12, 2004	Socorro	LINEAR	·	7.5 km	MPC · JPL
242426	2004 LY_{25}	—	June 15, 2004	Kitt Peak	Spacewatch	·	3.8 km	MPC · JPL
242427	2004 NW_{11}	—	July 11, 2004	Socorro	LINEAR	·	5.0 km	MPC · JPL
242428	2004 NP_{19}	—	July 14, 2004	Socorro	LINEAR	·	5.0 km	MPC · JPL
242429	2004 NV_{20}	—	July 14, 2004	Socorro	LINEAR	·	5.6 km	MPC · JPL
242430	2004 NW_{20}	—	July 14, 2004	Socorro	LINEAR	·	5.3 km	MPC · JPL
242431	2004 NT_{26}	—	July 11, 2004	Socorro	LINEAR	·	5.3 km	MPC · JPL
242432	2004 NE_{28}	—	July 11, 2004	Socorro	LINEAR	·	2.4 km	MPC · JPL
242433	2004 NF_{28}	—	July 11, 2004	Socorro	LINEAR	·	1.4 km	MPC · JPL
242434	2004 NK_{29}	—	July 14, 2004	Socorro	LINEAR	·	3.5 km	MPC · JPL
242435	2004 ND_{30}	—	July 15, 2004	Siding Spring	SSS	T_{j} (2.98) · EUP	6.4 km	MPC · JPL
242436	2004 OA_{2}	—	July 16, 2004	Socorro	LINEAR	·	3.5 km	MPC · JPL
242437	2004 OX_{4}	—	July 16, 2004	Socorro	LINEAR	·	2.5 km	MPC · JPL
242438	2004 PQ_{9}	—	August 6, 2004	Campo Imperatore	CINEOS	·	6.0 km	MPC · JPL
242439	2004 PO_{40}	—	August 9, 2004	Socorro	LINEAR	ERI	2.8 km	MPC · JPL
242440	2004 PB_{47}	—	August 8, 2004	Palomar	NEAT	·	5.4 km	MPC · JPL
242441	2004 PW_{47}	—	August 8, 2004	Socorro	LINEAR	·	2.4 km	MPC · JPL
242442	2004 PL_{58}	—	August 9, 2004	Socorro	LINEAR	·	2.0 km	MPC · JPL
242443	2004 PR_{60}	—	August 9, 2004	Socorro	LINEAR	HOF	3.2 km	MPC · JPL
242444	2004 PR_{67}	—	August 6, 2004	Palomar	NEAT	·	5.3 km	MPC · JPL
242445	2004 PP_{95}	—	August 12, 2004	Reedy Creek	J. Broughton	·	3.4 km	MPC · JPL
242446	2004 PK_{96}	—	August 11, 2004	Goodricke-Pigott	Goodricke-Pigott	·	4.0 km	MPC · JPL
242447	2004 PG_{106}	—	August 14, 2004	Campo Imperatore	CINEOS	·	2.1 km	MPC · JPL
242448	2004 PR_{114}	—	August 12, 2004	Socorro	LINEAR	·	1.6 km	MPC · JPL
242449	2004 QA_{1}	—	August 16, 2004	Palomar	NEAT	·	3.6 km	MPC · JPL
242450	2004 QY_{2}	—	August 20, 2004	Siding Spring	SSS	APO +1km · PHA	2.9 km	MPC · JPL
242451	2004 QS_{14}	—	August 21, 2004	Catalina	CSS	T_{j} (2.97) · 3:2	6.6 km	MPC · JPL
242452	2004 QB_{27}	—	August 23, 2004	Kitt Peak	Spacewatch	·	3.0 km	MPC · JPL
242453	2004 RH_{1}	—	September 4, 2004	Palomar	NEAT	DOR	3.1 km	MPC · JPL
242454	2004 RM_{32}	—	September 7, 2004	Socorro	LINEAR	·	4.0 km	MPC · JPL
242455	2004 RV_{35}	—	September 7, 2004	Socorro	LINEAR	·	2.4 km	MPC · JPL
242456	2004 RX_{62}	—	September 8, 2004	Socorro	LINEAR	·	2.1 km	MPC · JPL
242457	2004 RC_{141}	—	September 8, 2004	Socorro	LINEAR	DOR	3.6 km	MPC · JPL
242458	2004 RM_{158}	—	September 10, 2004	Socorro	LINEAR	·	2.7 km	MPC · JPL
242459	2004 RU_{184}	—	September 10, 2004	Socorro	LINEAR	CYB	6.0 km	MPC · JPL
242460	2004 RD_{196}	—	September 10, 2004	Socorro	LINEAR	·	2.8 km	MPC · JPL
242461	2004 RD_{201}	—	September 10, 2004	Socorro	LINEAR	·	1.2 km	MPC · JPL
242462	2004 RY_{232}	—	September 9, 2004	Kitt Peak	Spacewatch	·	1.5 km	MPC · JPL
242463	2004 RN_{235}	—	September 10, 2004	Socorro	LINEAR	·	2.7 km	MPC · JPL
242464	2004 RB_{236}	—	September 10, 2004	Socorro	LINEAR	·	870 m	MPC · JPL
242465	2004 RC_{238}	—	September 10, 2004	Kitt Peak	Spacewatch	·	2.2 km	MPC · JPL
242466	2004 RS_{321}	—	September 13, 2004	Socorro	LINEAR	·	1.4 km	MPC · JPL
242467	2004 RP_{345}	—	September 4, 2004	Palomar	NEAT	HOF	4.3 km	MPC · JPL
242468	2004 SA_{3}	—	September 17, 2004	Piszkéstető	K. Sárneczky	·	2.2 km	MPC · JPL
242469	2004 SN_{45}	—	September 18, 2004	Socorro	LINEAR	NEM	3.1 km	MPC · JPL
242470	2004 SZ_{45}	—	September 18, 2004	Socorro	LINEAR	·	3.1 km	MPC · JPL
242471	2004 SB_{53}	—	September 22, 2004	Socorro	LINEAR	·	870 m	MPC · JPL
242472	2004 SO_{60}	—	September 16, 2004	Kitt Peak	Spacewatch	·	2.6 km	MPC · JPL
242473	2004 TG_{27}	—	October 4, 2004	Kitt Peak	Spacewatch	CYB	3.9 km	MPC · JPL
242474	2004 TT_{32}	—	October 4, 2004	Kitt Peak	Spacewatch	·	2.5 km	MPC · JPL
242475	2004 TL_{41}	—	October 4, 2004	Kitt Peak	Spacewatch	·	1.0 km	MPC · JPL
242476	2004 TT_{42}	—	October 4, 2004	Kitt Peak	Spacewatch	·	880 m	MPC · JPL
242477	2004 TH_{49}	—	October 4, 2004	Kitt Peak	Spacewatch	KON	3.3 km	MPC · JPL
242478	2004 TZ_{57}	—	October 5, 2004	Kitt Peak	Spacewatch	·	800 m	MPC · JPL
242479 Marijampolė	2004 TF_{115}	Marijampolė	October 12, 2004	Moletai	K. Černis, Zdanavicius, J.	·	1.3 km	MPC · JPL
242480	2004 TZ_{157}	—	October 6, 2004	Kitt Peak	Spacewatch	·	3.2 km	MPC · JPL
242481	2004 TW_{220}	—	October 7, 2004	Palomar	NEAT	ULA · CYB	9.9 km	MPC · JPL
242482	2004 TE_{288}	—	October 9, 2004	Kitt Peak	Spacewatch	·	930 m	MPC · JPL
242483	2004 TF_{308}	—	October 10, 2004	Socorro	LINEAR	·	2.9 km	MPC · JPL
242484	2004 TU_{323}	—	October 11, 2004	Kitt Peak	Spacewatch	·	5.1 km	MPC · JPL
242485	2004 TB_{342}	—	October 13, 2004	Kitt Peak	Spacewatch	·	1.2 km	MPC · JPL
242486	2004 UY_{7}	—	October 21, 2004	Socorro	LINEAR	V	980 m	MPC · JPL
242487	2004 VV_{8}	—	November 3, 2004	Anderson Mesa	LONEOS	·	1.8 km	MPC · JPL
242488	2004 VJ_{24}	—	November 7, 2004	Charleston	Astronomical Research Observatory	·	2.4 km	MPC · JPL
242489	2004 VX_{25}	—	November 4, 2004	Catalina	CSS	·	1.4 km	MPC · JPL
242490	2004 VU_{57}	—	November 7, 2004	Socorro	LINEAR	·	1.7 km	MPC · JPL
242491	2004 VS_{65}	—	November 14, 2004	Cordell-Lorenz	D. T. Durig	NYS ·	3.1 km	MPC · JPL
242492 Fantomas	2004 VU_{65}	Fantomas	November 10, 2004	Nogales	M. Ory	·	2.3 km	MPC · JPL
242493	2004 WO_{12}	—	November 22, 2004	Siding Spring	R. H. McNaught	·	3.2 km	MPC · JPL
242494	2004 XH_{4}	—	December 2, 2004	Socorro	LINEAR	PHO	4.1 km	MPC · JPL
242495	2004 XN_{10}	—	December 2, 2004	Palomar	NEAT	·	1.5 km	MPC · JPL
242496	2004 XP_{13}	—	December 8, 2004	Socorro	LINEAR	KRM	3.3 km	MPC · JPL
242497	2004 XL_{20}	—	December 8, 2004	Socorro	LINEAR	·	3.3 km	MPC · JPL
242498	2004 XG_{25}	—	December 9, 2004	Catalina	CSS	·	3.2 km	MPC · JPL
242499	2004 XS_{26}	—	December 10, 2004	Socorro	LINEAR	·	3.3 km	MPC · JPL
242500	2004 XK_{32}	—	December 10, 2004	Socorro	LINEAR	·	8.0 km	MPC · JPL

== 242501–242600 ==
back to top

Designation			Discovery			Properties		Ref
Permanent	Provisional	Named after	Date	Site	Discoverer(s)	Category	Diam.	Ref
242501	2004 XS_{38}	—	December 7, 2004	Socorro	LINEAR	·	1.6 km	MPC · JPL
242502	2004 XA_{50}	—	December 12, 2004	Kitt Peak	Spacewatch	·	1.3 km	MPC · JPL
242503	2004 XS_{69}	—	December 10, 2004	Kitt Peak	Spacewatch	·	2.9 km	MPC · JPL
242504	2004 XO_{80}	—	December 10, 2004	Socorro	LINEAR	(5)	1.4 km	MPC · JPL
242505	2004 XS_{84}	—	December 12, 2004	Vail-Jarnac	Jarnac	(5)	2.6 km	MPC · JPL
242506	2004 XV_{85}	—	December 13, 2004	Kitt Peak	Spacewatch	TIR	3.2 km	MPC · JPL
242507	2004 XY_{98}	—	December 11, 2004	Kitt Peak	Spacewatch	MAS	1.2 km	MPC · JPL
242508	2004 XJ_{99}	—	December 12, 2004	Kitt Peak	Spacewatch	·	6.4 km	MPC · JPL
242509	2004 XE_{125}	—	December 11, 2004	Catalina	CSS	·	4.9 km	MPC · JPL
242510	2004 XQ_{164}	—	December 15, 2004	Socorro	LINEAR	·	4.3 km	MPC · JPL
242511	2004 XO_{191}	—	December 10, 2004	Kitt Peak	Spacewatch	·	2.6 km	MPC · JPL
242512	2004 YP_{14}	—	December 18, 2004	Mount Lemmon	Mount Lemmon Survey	(5)	1.6 km	MPC · JPL
242513	2004 YM_{19}	—	December 18, 2004	Mount Lemmon	Mount Lemmon Survey	MIS	3.3 km	MPC · JPL
242514	2004 YY_{28}	—	December 16, 2004	Socorro	LINEAR	·	2.8 km	MPC · JPL
242515	2004 YS_{32}	—	December 31, 2004	Junk Bond	Junk Bond	·	2.8 km	MPC · JPL
242516 Lindseystirling	2005 AW	Lindseystirling	January 4, 2005	Vicques	M. Ory	NEM	2.7 km	MPC · JPL
242517	2005 AD_{1}	—	January 1, 2005	Catalina	CSS	·	3.3 km	MPC · JPL
242518	2005 AK_{2}	—	January 6, 2005	Socorro	LINEAR	(895)	4.8 km	MPC · JPL
242519	2005 AH_{7}	—	January 6, 2005	Catalina	CSS	·	3.3 km	MPC · JPL
242520	2005 AS_{7}	—	January 6, 2005	Catalina	CSS	·	3.3 km	MPC · JPL
242521	2005 AG_{9}	—	January 7, 2005	Catalina	CSS	·	2.3 km	MPC · JPL
242522	2005 AH_{9}	—	January 7, 2005	Catalina	CSS	·	4.9 km	MPC · JPL
242523 Kreszgéza	2005 AJ_{10}	Kreszgéza	January 5, 2005	Piszkéstető	K. Sárneczky	·	2.5 km	MPC · JPL
242524	2005 AN_{10}	—	January 6, 2005	Catalina	CSS	·	3.4 km	MPC · JPL
242525	2005 AQ_{22}	—	January 7, 2005	Socorro	LINEAR	·	2.8 km	MPC · JPL
242526	2005 AT_{30}	—	January 9, 2005	Catalina	CSS	·	2.9 km	MPC · JPL
242527	2005 AL_{34}	—	January 13, 2005	Kitt Peak	Spacewatch	·	1.8 km	MPC · JPL
242528	2005 AD_{48}	—	January 13, 2005	Kitt Peak	Spacewatch	·	2.1 km	MPC · JPL
242529 Hilaomar	2005 AL_{54}	Hilaomar	January 13, 2005	Vicques	M. Ory	·	3.8 km	MPC · JPL
242530	2005 AG_{56}	—	January 15, 2005	Socorro	LINEAR	·	2.5 km	MPC · JPL
242531	2005 AW_{58}	—	January 15, 2005	Socorro	LINEAR	·	3.8 km	MPC · JPL
242532	2005 AJ_{69}	—	January 15, 2005	Socorro	LINEAR	·	2.1 km	MPC · JPL
242533	2005 AV_{79}	—	January 15, 2005	Kitt Peak	Spacewatch	HOF	3.2 km	MPC · JPL
242534	2005 AJ_{82}	—	January 15, 2005	Kitt Peak	Spacewatch	·	2.5 km	MPC · JPL
242535	2005 BR	—	January 16, 2005	Desert Eagle	W. K. Y. Yeung	·	3.0 km	MPC · JPL
242536	2005 BC_{8}	—	January 16, 2005	Socorro	LINEAR	·	2.7 km	MPC · JPL
242537	2005 BQ_{23}	—	January 17, 2005	Kitt Peak	Spacewatch	EUN	2.0 km	MPC · JPL
242538	2005 BW_{48}	—	January 17, 2005	La Silla	A. Boattini, H. Scholl	·	4.5 km	MPC · JPL
242539	2005 CS_{5}	—	February 1, 2005	Palomar	NEAT	·	4.4 km	MPC · JPL
242540	2005 CG_{12}	—	February 1, 2005	Palomar	NEAT	·	2.4 km	MPC · JPL
242541	2005 CX_{63}	—	February 9, 2005	Anderson Mesa	LONEOS	·	1.9 km	MPC · JPL
242542	2005 CR_{64}	—	February 9, 2005	Anderson Mesa	LONEOS	·	2.6 km	MPC · JPL
242543	2005 CM_{68}	—	February 2, 2005	Catalina	CSS	·	2.3 km	MPC · JPL
242544	2005 CR_{68}	—	February 3, 2005	Anderson Mesa	LONEOS	DOR	4.0 km	MPC · JPL
242545	2005 DA_{1}	—	February 28, 2005	Socorro	LINEAR	·	2.6 km	MPC · JPL
242546	2005 EX_{12}	—	March 2, 2005	Catalina	CSS	(21344)	2.1 km	MPC · JPL
242547	2005 EF_{18}	—	March 3, 2005	Catalina	CSS	·	2.2 km	MPC · JPL
242548	2005 EP_{35}	—	March 4, 2005	Catalina	CSS	·	2.4 km	MPC · JPL
242549	2005 EB_{36}	—	March 4, 2005	Catalina	CSS	·	3.5 km	MPC · JPL
242550	2005 EU_{47}	—	March 3, 2005	Catalina	CSS	·	2.6 km	MPC · JPL
242551	2005 EG_{79}	—	March 3, 2005	Catalina	CSS	ERI	2.7 km	MPC · JPL
242552	2005 EW_{91}	—	March 8, 2005	Mount Lemmon	Mount Lemmon Survey	·	1.9 km	MPC · JPL
242553	2005 EW_{93}	—	March 8, 2005	Socorro	LINEAR	·	2.1 km	MPC · JPL
242554	2005 EP_{115}	—	March 4, 2005	Socorro	LINEAR	·	5.1 km	MPC · JPL
242555	2005 EG_{118}	—	March 7, 2005	Socorro	LINEAR	·	3.2 km	MPC · JPL
242556	2005 EC_{120}	—	March 8, 2005	Kitt Peak	Spacewatch	·	2.2 km	MPC · JPL
242557	2005 EZ_{128}	—	March 9, 2005	Kitt Peak	Spacewatch	·	1.2 km	MPC · JPL
242558	2005 EE_{139}	—	March 9, 2005	Mount Lemmon	Mount Lemmon Survey	·	4.9 km	MPC · JPL
242559	2005 EY_{144}	—	March 10, 2005	Mount Lemmon	Mount Lemmon Survey	·	2.0 km	MPC · JPL
242560	2005 EZ_{159}	—	March 9, 2005	Mount Lemmon	Mount Lemmon Survey	·	2.6 km	MPC · JPL
242561	2005 EG_{166}	—	March 11, 2005	Mount Lemmon	Mount Lemmon Survey	·	2.4 km	MPC · JPL
242562	2005 EZ_{176}	—	March 8, 2005	Mount Lemmon	Mount Lemmon Survey	·	4.7 km	MPC · JPL
242563	2005 EV_{181}	—	March 9, 2005	Socorro	LINEAR	·	2.9 km	MPC · JPL
242564	2005 EZ_{184}	—	March 9, 2005	Kitt Peak	Spacewatch	AGN	1.5 km	MPC · JPL
242565	2005 EM_{207}	—	March 8, 2005	Anderson Mesa	LONEOS	·	4.2 km	MPC · JPL
242566	2005 ES_{210}	—	March 4, 2005	Kitt Peak	Spacewatch	·	2.1 km	MPC · JPL
242567	2005 EO_{212}	—	March 4, 2005	Catalina	CSS	GAL	2.1 km	MPC · JPL
242568	2005 EC_{248}	—	March 12, 2005	Kitt Peak	Spacewatch	·	2.3 km	MPC · JPL
242569	2005 EG_{252}	—	March 10, 2005	Mount Lemmon	Mount Lemmon Survey	·	2.0 km	MPC · JPL
242570	2005 EL_{267}	—	March 13, 2005	Kitt Peak	Spacewatch	·	1.9 km	MPC · JPL
242571	2005 EQ_{330}	—	March 4, 2005	Catalina	CSS	NAE	5.1 km	MPC · JPL
242572	2005 GY_{7}	—	April 2, 2005	Needville	Needville	·	3.0 km	MPC · JPL
242573	2005 GW_{13}	—	April 1, 2005	Anderson Mesa	LONEOS	·	1.8 km	MPC · JPL
242574	2005 GJ_{22}	—	April 4, 2005	Catalina	CSS	·	3.9 km	MPC · JPL
242575	2005 GG_{25}	—	April 2, 2005	Mount Lemmon	Mount Lemmon Survey	MRX	1.2 km	MPC · JPL
242576	2005 GF_{28}	—	April 3, 2005	Siding Spring	SSS	·	6.3 km	MPC · JPL
242577	2005 GP_{34}	—	April 1, 2005	Anderson Mesa	LONEOS	·	2.6 km	MPC · JPL
242578	2005 GJ_{50}	—	April 5, 2005	Palomar	NEAT	·	3.3 km	MPC · JPL
242579	2005 GX_{61}	—	April 2, 2005	Kitt Peak	Spacewatch	·	3.0 km	MPC · JPL
242580	2005 GF_{75}	—	April 5, 2005	Mount Lemmon	Mount Lemmon Survey	BAR	1.4 km	MPC · JPL
242581	2005 GZ_{118}	—	April 11, 2005	Mount Lemmon	Mount Lemmon Survey	·	2.2 km	MPC · JPL
242582	2005 GB_{129}	—	April 7, 2005	Palomar	NEAT	KON	4.1 km	MPC · JPL
242583	2005 GA_{133}	—	April 10, 2005	Kitt Peak	Spacewatch	HOF · fast	3.2 km	MPC · JPL
242584	2005 GW_{138}	—	April 12, 2005	Kitt Peak	Spacewatch	·	3.7 km	MPC · JPL
242585	2005 GM_{149}	—	April 11, 2005	Kitt Peak	Spacewatch	·	4.5 km	MPC · JPL
242586	2005 GV_{149}	—	April 11, 2005	Kitt Peak	Spacewatch	ADE	2.4 km	MPC · JPL
242587	2005 GP_{154}	—	April 9, 2005	Socorro	LINEAR	HYG	3.5 km	MPC · JPL
242588	2005 GV_{172}	—	April 14, 2005	Kitt Peak	Spacewatch	·	3.5 km	MPC · JPL
242589	2005 GR_{214}	—	April 4, 2005	Catalina	CSS	·	5.2 km	MPC · JPL
242590	2005 GO_{227}	—	April 6, 2005	Anderson Mesa	LONEOS	·	3.7 km	MPC · JPL
242591	2005 HO_{1}	—	April 16, 2005	Kitt Peak	Spacewatch	·	2.1 km	MPC · JPL
242592	2005 HM_{10}	—	April 16, 2005	Kitt Peak	Spacewatch	·	3.8 km	MPC · JPL
242593	2005 JE_{12}	—	May 4, 2005	Mauna Kea	Veillet, C.	AGN	1.7 km	MPC · JPL
242594	2005 JJ_{17}	—	May 4, 2005	Catalina	CSS	·	4.1 km	MPC · JPL
242595	2005 JT_{24}	—	May 3, 2005	Kitt Peak	Spacewatch	·	6.0 km	MPC · JPL
242596	2005 JS_{27}	—	May 3, 2005	Catalina	CSS	·	4.5 km	MPC · JPL
242597	2005 JY_{28}	—	May 3, 2005	Kitt Peak	Spacewatch	L4	10 km	MPC · JPL
242598	2005 JJ_{36}	—	May 4, 2005	Kitt Peak	Spacewatch	EOS	2.1 km	MPC · JPL
242599	2005 JG_{45}	—	May 2, 2005	Kitt Peak	Deep Lens Survey	T_{j} (2.99) · EUP	5.9 km	MPC · JPL
242600	2005 JD_{49}	—	May 4, 2005	Kitt Peak	Spacewatch	·	4.3 km	MPC · JPL

== 242601–242700 ==
back to top

Designation			Discovery			Properties		Ref
Permanent	Provisional	Named after	Date	Site	Discoverer(s)	Category	Diam.	Ref
242601	2005 JW_{52}	—	May 4, 2005	Kitt Peak	Spacewatch	·	4.6 km	MPC · JPL
242602	2005 JA_{58}	—	May 7, 2005	Kitt Peak	Spacewatch	·	2.3 km	MPC · JPL
242603	2005 JG_{69}	—	May 6, 2005	Kitt Peak	Spacewatch	URS	4.1 km	MPC · JPL
242604	2005 JU_{71}	—	May 8, 2005	Anderson Mesa	LONEOS	·	4.0 km	MPC · JPL
242605	2005 JO_{72}	—	May 8, 2005	Kitt Peak	Spacewatch	KOR	1.7 km	MPC · JPL
242606	2005 JV_{77}	—	May 10, 2005	Anderson Mesa	LONEOS	·	2.8 km	MPC · JPL
242607	2005 JR_{87}	—	May 9, 2005	Catalina	CSS	·	2.3 km	MPC · JPL
242608	2005 JR_{89}	—	May 11, 2005	Palomar	NEAT	·	5.4 km	MPC · JPL
242609	2005 JE_{98}	—	May 8, 2005	Kitt Peak	Spacewatch	·	3.9 km	MPC · JPL
242610	2005 JX_{99}	—	May 9, 2005	Kitt Peak	Spacewatch	·	4.6 km	MPC · JPL
242611	2005 JG_{102}	—	May 9, 2005	Kitt Peak	Spacewatch	·	4.6 km	MPC · JPL
242612	2005 JT_{102}	—	May 9, 2005	Catalina	CSS	·	4.1 km	MPC · JPL
242613	2005 JH_{108}	—	May 3, 2005	Kitt Peak	Spacewatch	·	3.4 km	MPC · JPL
242614	2005 JY_{112}	—	May 10, 2005	Kitt Peak	Spacewatch	·	2.5 km	MPC · JPL
242615	2005 JO_{129}	—	May 13, 2005	Kitt Peak	Spacewatch	·	3.5 km	MPC · JPL
242616	2005 JA_{139}	—	May 13, 2005	Mount Lemmon	Mount Lemmon Survey	·	2.8 km	MPC · JPL
242617	2005 JE_{141}	—	May 14, 2005	Mount Lemmon	Mount Lemmon Survey	EUP	4.3 km	MPC · JPL
242618	2005 JT_{143}	—	May 15, 2005	Mount Lemmon	Mount Lemmon Survey	·	3.0 km	MPC · JPL
242619	2005 JL_{174}	—	May 11, 2005	Cerro Tololo	M. W. Buie	EMA	3.9 km	MPC · JPL
242620	2005 JV_{175}	—	May 3, 2005	Catalina	CSS	EUN	1.7 km	MPC · JPL
242621	2005 JY_{178}	—	May 13, 2005	Socorro	LINEAR	·	2.7 km	MPC · JPL
242622	2005 KF_{2}	—	May 16, 2005	Mount Lemmon	Mount Lemmon Survey	·	3.6 km	MPC · JPL
242623	2005 KJ_{8}	—	May 21, 2005	Mount Lemmon	Mount Lemmon Survey	·	5.1 km	MPC · JPL
242624	2005 KH_{13}	—	May 21, 2005	Mount Lemmon	Mount Lemmon Survey	L4	12 km	MPC · JPL
242625	2005 LW_{9}	—	June 2, 2005	Catalina	CSS	·	4.2 km	MPC · JPL
242626	2005 LW_{10}	—	June 3, 2005	Kitt Peak	Spacewatch	·	3.0 km	MPC · JPL
242627	2005 LS_{11}	—	June 3, 2005	Kitt Peak	Spacewatch	·	3.1 km	MPC · JPL
242628	2005 LS_{15}	—	June 5, 2005	Kitt Peak	Spacewatch	·	3.4 km	MPC · JPL
242629	2005 LS_{17}	—	June 6, 2005	Kitt Peak	Spacewatch	·	3.8 km	MPC · JPL
242630	2005 MW_{4}	—	June 18, 2005	Mount Lemmon	Mount Lemmon Survey	·	6.2 km	MPC · JPL
242631	2005 MY_{4}	—	June 18, 2005	Mount Lemmon	Mount Lemmon Survey	·	4.8 km	MPC · JPL
242632	2005 MR_{20}	—	June 30, 2005	Kitt Peak	Spacewatch	·	4.8 km	MPC · JPL
242633	2005 MS_{26}	—	June 28, 2005	Mount Lemmon	Mount Lemmon Survey	·	3.9 km	MPC · JPL
242634	2005 ME_{28}	—	June 29, 2005	Kitt Peak	Spacewatch	·	3.6 km	MPC · JPL
242635	2005 MT_{30}	—	June 29, 2005	Palomar	NEAT	·	2.5 km	MPC · JPL
242636	2005 MG_{33}	—	June 29, 2005	Kitt Peak	Spacewatch	PAD	3.2 km	MPC · JPL
242637	2005 MQ_{38}	—	June 30, 2005	Kitt Peak	Spacewatch	HOF	3.4 km	MPC · JPL
242638	2005 MV_{39}	—	June 29, 2005	Palomar	NEAT	·	4.7 km	MPC · JPL
242639	2005 MP_{49}	—	June 30, 2005	Palomar	NEAT	·	2.6 km	MPC · JPL
242640	2005 ND	—	July 2, 2005	Wrightwood	J. W. Young	·	2.5 km	MPC · JPL
242641	2005 NN_{2}	—	July 2, 2005	Kitt Peak	Spacewatch	NEM	3.1 km	MPC · JPL
242642	2005 NE_{6}	—	July 4, 2005	Kitt Peak	Spacewatch	·	3.1 km	MPC · JPL
242643	2005 NZ_{6}	—	July 3, 2005	Palomar	NEAT	APO +1km · PHA	2.0 km	MPC · JPL
242644	2005 NN_{7}	—	July 3, 2005	Mount Lemmon	Mount Lemmon Survey	·	1.5 km	MPC · JPL
242645	2005 NK_{21}	—	July 1, 2005	Kitt Peak	Spacewatch	H	690 m	MPC · JPL
242646	2005 NF_{23}	—	July 4, 2005	Kitt Peak	Spacewatch	·	4.0 km	MPC · JPL
242647	2005 NM_{37}	—	July 6, 2005	Kitt Peak	Spacewatch	·	3.7 km	MPC · JPL
242648 Fribourg	2005 NQ_{63}	Fribourg	July 13, 2005	Marly	P. Kocher	·	4.0 km	MPC · JPL
242649	2005 NT_{99}	—	July 11, 2005	Catalina	CSS	·	6.7 km	MPC · JPL
242650	2005 NF_{102}	—	July 15, 2005	Mount Lemmon	Mount Lemmon Survey	H	800 m	MPC · JPL
242651	2005 OW_{2}	—	July 30, 2005	Socorro	LINEAR	·	5.0 km	MPC · JPL
242652	2005 OF_{10}	—	July 27, 2005	Palomar	NEAT	·	3.1 km	MPC · JPL
242653	2005 OL_{16}	—	July 29, 2005	Palomar	NEAT	·	2.2 km	MPC · JPL
242654	2005 PY_{8}	—	August 4, 2005	Palomar	NEAT	·	1.9 km	MPC · JPL
242655	2005 QF_{39}	—	August 26, 2005	Anderson Mesa	LONEOS	·	2.3 km	MPC · JPL
242656	2005 QC_{41}	—	August 26, 2005	Anderson Mesa	LONEOS	3:2	8.4 km	MPC · JPL
242657	2005 QC_{43}	—	August 26, 2005	Palomar	NEAT	EUP	5.0 km	MPC · JPL
242658	2005 QB_{58}	—	August 25, 2005	Palomar	NEAT	·	4.5 km	MPC · JPL
242659	2005 QB_{63}	—	August 26, 2005	Palomar	NEAT	NAE	4.5 km	MPC · JPL
242660	2005 QR_{88}	—	August 29, 2005	Goodricke-Pigott	R. A. Tucker	·	4.5 km	MPC · JPL
242661	2005 QT_{101}	—	August 27, 2005	Palomar	NEAT	CYB	4.5 km	MPC · JPL
242662	2005 QC_{156}	—	August 30, 2005	Palomar	NEAT	·	5.0 km	MPC · JPL
242663	2005 RV_{7}	—	September 8, 2005	Socorro	LINEAR	EOS	2.7 km	MPC · JPL
242664	2005 ST_{25}	—	September 28, 2005	Eskridge	G. Hug	·	2.0 km	MPC · JPL
242665	2005 SK_{56}	—	September 25, 2005	Kitt Peak	Spacewatch	THM	4.0 km	MPC · JPL
242666	2005 SB_{57}	—	September 26, 2005	Kitt Peak	Spacewatch	·	2.8 km	MPC · JPL
242667	2005 SH_{68}	—	September 27, 2005	Kitt Peak	Spacewatch	·	5.7 km	MPC · JPL
242668	2005 SB_{74}	—	September 23, 2005	Siding Spring	SSS	·	12 km	MPC · JPL
242669	2005 SE_{104}	—	September 25, 2005	Kitt Peak	Spacewatch	·	4.2 km	MPC · JPL
242670	2005 SP_{105}	—	September 25, 2005	Palomar	NEAT	·	3.9 km	MPC · JPL
242671	2005 SH_{110}	—	September 26, 2005	Kitt Peak	Spacewatch	·	5.8 km	MPC · JPL
242672	2005 SO_{124}	—	September 29, 2005	Catalina	CSS	·	3.4 km	MPC · JPL
242673	2005 SL_{126}	—	September 29, 2005	Palomar	NEAT	LIX	4.7 km	MPC · JPL
242674	2005 SO_{146}	—	September 25, 2005	Kitt Peak	Spacewatch	·	3.9 km	MPC · JPL
242675	2005 SC_{164}	—	September 27, 2005	Palomar	NEAT	VER	4.1 km	MPC · JPL
242676	2005 SS_{175}	—	September 29, 2005	Kitt Peak	Spacewatch	·	2.0 km	MPC · JPL
242677	2005 ST_{183}	—	September 29, 2005	Kitt Peak	Spacewatch	·	4.7 km	MPC · JPL
242678	2005 SB_{187}	—	September 29, 2005	Palomar	NEAT	·	5.2 km	MPC · JPL
242679	2005 SM_{193}	—	September 29, 2005	Kitt Peak	Spacewatch	·	3.6 km	MPC · JPL
242680	2005 SX_{211}	—	September 30, 2005	Mount Lemmon	Mount Lemmon Survey	·	3.4 km	MPC · JPL
242681	2005 SR_{222}	—	September 30, 2005	Mount Lemmon	Mount Lemmon Survey	·	4.4 km	MPC · JPL
242682	2005 SW_{230}	—	September 30, 2005	Mount Lemmon	Mount Lemmon Survey	3:2 · SHU	6.4 km	MPC · JPL
242683	2005 SS_{246}	—	September 30, 2005	Kitt Peak	Spacewatch	·	5.5 km	MPC · JPL
242684	2005 SL_{250}	—	September 23, 2005	Catalina	CSS	·	4.1 km	MPC · JPL
242685	2005 SY_{254}	—	September 22, 2005	Palomar	NEAT	·	4.3 km	MPC · JPL
242686	2005 SK_{259}	—	September 24, 2005	Anderson Mesa	LONEOS	·	4.3 km	MPC · JPL
242687	2005 SO_{262}	—	September 23, 2005	Palomar	NEAT	·	3.7 km	MPC · JPL
242688	2005 SE_{269}	—	September 26, 2005	Palomar	NEAT	H	840 m	MPC · JPL
242689	2005 TJ_{3}	—	October 1, 2005	Socorro	LINEAR	·	3.6 km	MPC · JPL
242690	2005 TN_{6}	—	October 1, 2005	Catalina	CSS	EOS	2.8 km	MPC · JPL
242691	2005 TV_{6}	—	October 1, 2005	Catalina	CSS	·	4.0 km	MPC · JPL
242692	2005 TW_{9}	—	October 1, 2005	Anderson Mesa	LONEOS	THM	3.6 km	MPC · JPL
242693	2005 TT_{15}	—	October 3, 2005	Silver Spring	Spring, Silver	·	4.0 km	MPC · JPL
242694	2005 TG_{23}	—	October 1, 2005	Socorro	LINEAR	·	4.8 km	MPC · JPL
242695	2005 TJ_{23}	—	October 1, 2005	Anderson Mesa	LONEOS	·	4.5 km	MPC · JPL
242696	2005 TR_{25}	—	October 1, 2005	Mount Lemmon	Mount Lemmon Survey	THM	4.5 km	MPC · JPL
242697	2005 TC_{48}	—	October 6, 2005	Kitt Peak	Spacewatch	·	5.4 km	MPC · JPL
242698	2005 TS_{52}	—	October 11, 2005	Junk Bond	D. Healy	HYG	4.7 km	MPC · JPL
242699	2005 TY_{54}	—	October 4, 2005	Palomar	NEAT	·	3.6 km	MPC · JPL
242700	2005 TA_{63}	—	October 4, 2005	Mount Lemmon	Mount Lemmon Survey	·	3.6 km	MPC · JPL

== 242701–242800 ==
back to top

Designation			Discovery			Properties		Ref
Permanent	Provisional	Named after	Date	Site	Discoverer(s)	Category	Diam.	Ref
242701	2005 TM_{72}	—	October 5, 2005	Catalina	CSS	EOS	3.7 km	MPC · JPL
242702	2005 TL_{75}	—	October 3, 2005	Catalina	CSS	EOS	2.8 km	MPC · JPL
242703	2005 TA_{99}	—	October 7, 2005	Catalina	CSS	TEL	2.8 km	MPC · JPL
242704	2005 TN_{119}	—	October 7, 2005	Kitt Peak	Spacewatch	·	4.3 km	MPC · JPL
242705	2005 TL_{131}	—	October 7, 2005	Kitt Peak	Spacewatch	·	2.8 km	MPC · JPL
242706	2005 TN_{162}	—	October 9, 2005	Kitt Peak	Spacewatch	·	3.0 km	MPC · JPL
242707	2005 TF_{190}	—	October 1, 2005	Catalina	CSS	EOS	3.0 km	MPC · JPL
242708	2005 UK_{1}	—	October 24, 2005	Mount Lemmon	Mount Lemmon Survey	APO +1km · PHA	850 m	MPC · JPL
242709	2005 UH_{24}	—	October 23, 2005	Kitt Peak	Spacewatch	·	3.1 km	MPC · JPL
242710	2005 UC_{54}	—	October 23, 2005	Catalina	CSS	·	3.3 km	MPC · JPL
242711	2005 UW_{56}	—	October 24, 2005	Anderson Mesa	LONEOS	·	2.3 km	MPC · JPL
242712	2005 US_{62}	—	October 25, 2005	Mount Lemmon	Mount Lemmon Survey	·	2.4 km	MPC · JPL
242713	2005 UD_{66}	—	October 22, 2005	Catalina	CSS	·	4.3 km	MPC · JPL
242714	2005 UD_{76}	—	October 24, 2005	Palomar	NEAT	·	4.9 km	MPC · JPL
242715	2005 UM_{79}	—	October 25, 2005	Catalina	CSS	·	3.9 km	MPC · JPL
242716	2005 UZ_{86}	—	October 22, 2005	Kitt Peak	Spacewatch	·	2.9 km	MPC · JPL
242717	2005 UO_{97}	—	October 22, 2005	Kitt Peak	Spacewatch	·	1.7 km	MPC · JPL
242718	2005 UQ_{112}	—	October 22, 2005	Kitt Peak	Spacewatch	·	2.2 km	MPC · JPL
242719	2005 UF_{130}	—	October 24, 2005	Palomar	NEAT	·	3.1 km	MPC · JPL
242720	2005 UT_{132}	—	October 24, 2005	Siding Spring	SSS	H	1 km	MPC · JPL
242721	2005 UD_{142}	—	October 25, 2005	Catalina	CSS	·	4.9 km	MPC · JPL
242722	2005 UX_{154}	—	October 26, 2005	Kitt Peak	Spacewatch	·	1.9 km	MPC · JPL
242723	2005 UD_{156}	—	October 26, 2005	Palomar	NEAT	·	2.6 km	MPC · JPL
242724	2005 UE_{156}	—	October 26, 2005	Palomar	NEAT	·	5.3 km	MPC · JPL
242725	2005 UR_{161}	—	October 25, 2005	Kitt Peak	Spacewatch	·	1.7 km	MPC · JPL
242726	2005 US_{161}	—	October 25, 2005	Kitt Peak	Spacewatch	·	4.8 km	MPC · JPL
242727	2005 UQ_{178}	—	October 24, 2005	Kitt Peak	Spacewatch	HYG	4.2 km	MPC · JPL
242728	2005 UC_{204}	—	October 25, 2005	Mount Lemmon	Mount Lemmon Survey	THM	2.5 km	MPC · JPL
242729	2005 UL_{211}	—	October 27, 2005	Kitt Peak	Spacewatch	CYB	4.9 km	MPC · JPL
242730	2005 UT_{216}	—	October 25, 2005	Mount Lemmon	Mount Lemmon Survey	·	4.2 km	MPC · JPL
242731	2005 UC_{286}	—	October 26, 2005	Kitt Peak	Spacewatch	·	4.1 km	MPC · JPL
242732	2005 UL_{310}	—	October 29, 2005	Mount Lemmon	Mount Lemmon Survey	·	3.1 km	MPC · JPL
242733	2005 UL_{313}	—	October 24, 2005	Palomar	NEAT	·	5.3 km	MPC · JPL
242734	2005 UO_{331}	—	October 29, 2005	Mount Lemmon	Mount Lemmon Survey	·	1.6 km	MPC · JPL
242735	2005 UD_{361}	—	October 27, 2005	Kitt Peak	Spacewatch	THM	2.9 km	MPC · JPL
242736	2005 UX_{402}	—	October 28, 2005	Socorro	LINEAR	·	2.8 km	MPC · JPL
242737	2005 UE_{438}	—	October 27, 2005	Kitt Peak	Spacewatch	·	5.1 km	MPC · JPL
242738	2005 UD_{439}	—	October 28, 2005	Mount Lemmon	Mount Lemmon Survey	·	1.7 km	MPC · JPL
242739	2005 UT_{440}	—	October 29, 2005	Catalina	CSS	·	4.7 km	MPC · JPL
242740	2005 UP_{476}	—	October 24, 2005	Palomar	NEAT	·	5.8 km	MPC · JPL
242741	2005 UX_{479}	—	October 31, 2005	Mount Lemmon	Mount Lemmon Survey	(5)	2.5 km	MPC · JPL
242742	2005 UG_{480}	—	October 30, 2005	Catalina	CSS	URS	5.1 km	MPC · JPL
242743	2005 UU_{493}	—	October 25, 2005	Catalina	CSS	·	6.1 km	MPC · JPL
242744	2005 UG_{530}	—	October 24, 2005	Palomar	NEAT	·	2.2 km	MPC · JPL
242745	2005 VS_{25}	—	November 2, 2005	Mount Lemmon	Mount Lemmon Survey	·	5.1 km	MPC · JPL
242746	2005 VS_{41}	—	November 1, 2005	Catalina	CSS	·	3.7 km	MPC · JPL
242747	2005 VV_{41}	—	November 2, 2005	Catalina	CSS	·	4.7 km	MPC · JPL
242748	2005 VT_{68}	—	November 1, 2005	Mount Lemmon	Mount Lemmon Survey	·	3.1 km	MPC · JPL
242749	2005 VQ_{78}	—	November 6, 2005	Anderson Mesa	LONEOS	·	4.6 km	MPC · JPL
242750	2005 VC_{82}	—	November 6, 2005	Mount Lemmon	Mount Lemmon Survey	·	3.4 km	MPC · JPL
242751	2005 VQ_{88}	—	November 6, 2005	Kitt Peak	Spacewatch	·	4.6 km	MPC · JPL
242752	2005 VL_{98}	—	November 10, 2005	Catalina	CSS	H	990 m	MPC · JPL
242753	2005 VW_{112}	—	November 9, 2005	Campo Imperatore	CINEOS	MIS	2.3 km	MPC · JPL
242754	2005 WD_{8}	—	November 22, 2005	Socorro	LINEAR	·	4.4 km	MPC · JPL
242755	2005 WE_{10}	—	November 21, 2005	Kitt Peak	Spacewatch	·	2.4 km	MPC · JPL
242756	2005 WN_{70}	—	November 26, 2005	Mount Lemmon	Mount Lemmon Survey	·	1.8 km	MPC · JPL
242757	2005 WX_{70}	—	November 21, 2005	Anderson Mesa	LONEOS	·	7.5 km	MPC · JPL
242758	2005 WX_{79}	—	November 25, 2005	Kitt Peak	Spacewatch	·	1.8 km	MPC · JPL
242759	2005 WH_{91}	—	November 28, 2005	Catalina	CSS	·	1.7 km	MPC · JPL
242760	2005 WN_{100}	—	November 29, 2005	Mount Lemmon	Mount Lemmon Survey	H	640 m	MPC · JPL
242761	2005 WX_{114}	—	November 28, 2005	Mount Lemmon	Mount Lemmon Survey	·	3.0 km	MPC · JPL
242762	2005 WY_{126}	—	November 25, 2005	Catalina	CSS	·	2.0 km	MPC · JPL
242763	2005 WF_{134}	—	November 25, 2005	Mount Lemmon	Mount Lemmon Survey	·	2.4 km	MPC · JPL
242764	2005 WO_{154}	—	November 29, 2005	Palomar	NEAT	·	3.0 km	MPC · JPL
242765	2005 WN_{156}	—	November 29, 2005	Palomar	NEAT	·	1.3 km	MPC · JPL
242766	2005 WU_{162}	—	November 28, 2005	Mount Lemmon	Mount Lemmon Survey	·	2.2 km	MPC · JPL
242767	2005 WG_{171}	—	November 30, 2005	Kitt Peak	Spacewatch	(2076)	1.4 km	MPC · JPL
242768	2005 WY_{173}	—	November 30, 2005	Mount Lemmon	Mount Lemmon Survey	·	2.9 km	MPC · JPL
242769	2005 WD_{181}	—	November 25, 2005	Catalina	CSS	EOS	3.6 km	MPC · JPL
242770	2005 XW_{62}	—	December 5, 2005	Mount Lemmon	Mount Lemmon Survey	·	1.8 km	MPC · JPL
242771	2005 XF_{65}	—	December 7, 2005	Socorro	LINEAR	·	2.4 km	MPC · JPL
242772	2005 XS_{79}	—	December 5, 2005	Socorro	LINEAR	PHO	3.3 km	MPC · JPL
242773	2005 XY_{109}	—	December 1, 2005	Kitt Peak	M. W. Buie	NYS	2.5 km	MPC · JPL
242774	2005 XH_{110}	—	December 1, 2005	Kitt Peak	M. W. Buie	·	2.1 km	MPC · JPL
242775	2005 XO_{111}	—	December 1, 2005	Kitt Peak	M. W. Buie	·	3.5 km	MPC · JPL
242776	2005 YL_{20}	—	December 24, 2005	Kitt Peak	Spacewatch	·	1.5 km	MPC · JPL
242777	2005 YU_{38}	—	December 22, 2005	Catalina	CSS	·	2.4 km	MPC · JPL
242778	2005 YK_{41}	—	December 21, 2005	Catalina	CSS	·	1.8 km	MPC · JPL
242779	2005 YD_{48}	—	December 22, 2005	Catalina	CSS	·	4.0 km	MPC · JPL
242780	2005 YB_{110}	—	December 25, 2005	Kitt Peak	Spacewatch	·	2.0 km	MPC · JPL
242781	2005 YN_{113}	—	December 25, 2005	Kitt Peak	Spacewatch	·	4.8 km	MPC · JPL
242782	2005 YZ_{119}	—	December 27, 2005	Mount Lemmon	Mount Lemmon Survey	·	1.6 km	MPC · JPL
242783	2005 YO_{131}	—	December 25, 2005	Mount Lemmon	Mount Lemmon Survey	NYS ·	2.2 km	MPC · JPL
242784	2005 YB_{134}	—	December 26, 2005	Kitt Peak	Spacewatch	·	1.6 km	MPC · JPL
242785	2005 YA_{163}	—	December 27, 2005	Mount Lemmon	Mount Lemmon Survey	·	2.8 km	MPC · JPL
242786	2005 YT_{166}	—	December 27, 2005	Kitt Peak	Spacewatch	·	1.4 km	MPC · JPL
242787	2005 YZ_{188}	—	December 28, 2005	Mount Lemmon	Mount Lemmon Survey	·	1.8 km	MPC · JPL
242788	2005 YA_{241}	—	December 29, 2005	Kitt Peak	Spacewatch	·	1.9 km	MPC · JPL
242789	2005 YH_{290}	—	December 27, 2005	Mount Lemmon	Mount Lemmon Survey	NYS	1.7 km	MPC · JPL
242790	2006 AH_{37}	—	January 4, 2006	Kitt Peak	Spacewatch	·	1.1 km	MPC · JPL
242791	2006 AZ_{41}	—	January 5, 2006	Kitt Peak	Spacewatch	·	750 m	MPC · JPL
242792	2006 AM_{46}	—	January 5, 2006	Kitt Peak	Spacewatch	·	5.8 km	MPC · JPL
242793	2006 AX_{57}	—	January 8, 2006	Mount Lemmon	Mount Lemmon Survey	·	1.1 km	MPC · JPL
242794	2006 AQ_{72}	—	January 6, 2006	Kitt Peak	Spacewatch	ERI	1.4 km	MPC · JPL
242795	2006 AX_{79}	—	January 11, 2006	Kitt Peak	Spacewatch	·	1.0 km	MPC · JPL
242796	2006 BO_{2}	—	January 20, 2006	Catalina	CSS	·	1.4 km	MPC · JPL
242797	2006 BJ_{9}	—	January 20, 2006	Catalina	CSS	·	4.5 km	MPC · JPL
242798	2006 BX_{12}	—	January 21, 2006	Mount Lemmon	Mount Lemmon Survey	·	1.2 km	MPC · JPL
242799	2006 BA_{20}	—	January 22, 2006	Anderson Mesa	LONEOS	·	1.7 km	MPC · JPL
242800	2006 BP_{36}	—	January 23, 2006	Kitt Peak	Spacewatch	·	2.4 km	MPC · JPL

== 242801–242900 ==
back to top

Designation			Discovery			Properties		Ref
Permanent	Provisional	Named after	Date	Site	Discoverer(s)	Category	Diam.	Ref
242801	2006 BB_{52}	—	January 25, 2006	Kitt Peak	Spacewatch	HYG	5.1 km	MPC · JPL
242802	2006 BY_{55}	—	January 27, 2006	7300	W. K. Y. Yeung	·	2.8 km	MPC · JPL
242803	2006 BO_{79}	—	January 23, 2006	Kitt Peak	Spacewatch	·	5.2 km	MPC · JPL
242804	2006 BU_{81}	—	January 23, 2006	Kitt Peak	Spacewatch	·	5.2 km	MPC · JPL
242805	2006 BP_{88}	—	January 25, 2006	Kitt Peak	Spacewatch	·	1.0 km	MPC · JPL
242806	2006 BD_{93}	—	January 26, 2006	Kitt Peak	Spacewatch	·	1.6 km	MPC · JPL
242807	2006 BQ_{93}	—	January 26, 2006	Kitt Peak	Spacewatch	·	1.2 km	MPC · JPL
242808	2006 BU_{119}	—	January 26, 2006	Kitt Peak	Spacewatch	·	1.6 km	MPC · JPL
242809	2006 BE_{121}	—	January 26, 2006	Kitt Peak	Spacewatch	V	720 m	MPC · JPL
242810	2006 BG_{129}	—	January 26, 2006	Mount Lemmon	Mount Lemmon Survey	·	740 m	MPC · JPL
242811	2006 BU_{144}	—	January 23, 2006	Catalina	CSS	·	2.5 km	MPC · JPL
242812	2006 BN_{149}	—	January 23, 2006	Kitt Peak	Spacewatch	·	4.3 km	MPC · JPL
242813	2006 BJ_{150}	—	January 24, 2006	Anderson Mesa	LONEOS	·	1.2 km	MPC · JPL
242814	2006 BL_{152}	—	January 25, 2006	Kitt Peak	Spacewatch	·	2.7 km	MPC · JPL
242815	2006 BZ_{156}	—	January 25, 2006	Kitt Peak	Spacewatch	·	3.4 km	MPC · JPL
242816	2006 BV_{165}	—	January 26, 2006	Mount Lemmon	Mount Lemmon Survey	NYS	1.4 km	MPC · JPL
242817	2006 BZ_{166}	—	January 26, 2006	Mount Lemmon	Mount Lemmon Survey	·	2.7 km	MPC · JPL
242818	2006 BE_{170}	—	January 26, 2006	Mount Lemmon	Mount Lemmon Survey	·	2.0 km	MPC · JPL
242819	2006 BZ_{220}	—	January 30, 2006	Catalina	CSS	·	1.6 km	MPC · JPL
242820	2006 BU_{254}	—	January 31, 2006	Kitt Peak	Spacewatch	·	2.4 km	MPC · JPL
242821	2006 BW_{254}	—	January 31, 2006	Kitt Peak	Spacewatch	·	1.0 km	MPC · JPL
242822	2006 BW_{259}	—	January 31, 2006	Mount Lemmon	Mount Lemmon Survey	·	1.5 km	MPC · JPL
242823	2006 BW_{275}	—	January 23, 2006	Kitt Peak	Spacewatch	·	1.5 km	MPC · JPL
242824	2006 CB_{43}	—	February 2, 2006	Kitt Peak	Spacewatch	·	2.0 km	MPC · JPL
242825	2006 CA_{57}	—	February 4, 2006	Mount Lemmon	Mount Lemmon Survey	·	3.9 km	MPC · JPL
242826	2006 CN_{57}	—	February 4, 2006	Kitt Peak	Spacewatch	·	1.1 km	MPC · JPL
242827	2006 CS_{57}	—	February 4, 2006	Mount Lemmon	Mount Lemmon Survey	NYS	1.3 km	MPC · JPL
242828	2006 DC_{1}	—	February 20, 2006	Mount Lemmon	Mount Lemmon Survey	·	4.2 km	MPC · JPL
242829	2006 DS_{7}	—	February 20, 2006	Kitt Peak	Spacewatch	NYS	1.3 km	MPC · JPL
242830 Richardwessling	2006 DK_{8}	Richardwessling	February 21, 2006	Charleston	R. Holmes	EOS	4.6 km	MPC · JPL
242831	2006 DW_{9}	—	February 21, 2006	Kitt Peak	Spacewatch	·	2.3 km	MPC · JPL
242832	2006 DJ_{36}	—	February 20, 2006	Mount Lemmon	Mount Lemmon Survey	LIX	6.3 km	MPC · JPL
242833	2006 DW_{42}	—	February 20, 2006	Kitt Peak	Spacewatch	·	880 m	MPC · JPL
242834	2006 DC_{51}	—	February 23, 2006	Kitt Peak	Spacewatch	·	5.1 km	MPC · JPL
242835	2006 DJ_{66}	—	February 22, 2006	Anderson Mesa	LONEOS	·	1.9 km	MPC · JPL
242836	2006 DT_{67}	—	February 23, 2006	Anderson Mesa	LONEOS	ARM	5.7 km	MPC · JPL
242837	2006 DN_{71}	—	February 21, 2006	Catalina	CSS	·	4.1 km	MPC · JPL
242838	2006 DG_{82}	—	February 24, 2006	Kitt Peak	Spacewatch	·	2.1 km	MPC · JPL
242839	2006 DD_{95}	—	February 24, 2006	Kitt Peak	Spacewatch	·	2.9 km	MPC · JPL
242840	2006 DY_{106}	—	February 25, 2006	Kitt Peak	Spacewatch	·	1.6 km	MPC · JPL
242841	2006 DO_{109}	—	February 25, 2006	Kitt Peak	Spacewatch	·	3.0 km	MPC · JPL
242842	2006 DM_{120}	—	February 21, 2006	Catalina	CSS	NYS	1.7 km	MPC · JPL
242843	2006 DO_{205}	—	February 25, 2006	Mount Lemmon	Mount Lemmon Survey	L5	17 km	MPC · JPL
242844	2006 EM	—	March 5, 2006	Mayhill	Lowe, A.	·	2.1 km	MPC · JPL
242845	2006 EQ_{10}	—	March 2, 2006	Kitt Peak	Spacewatch	EOS	3.0 km	MPC · JPL
242846	2006 EE_{39}	—	March 4, 2006	Catalina	CSS	·	3.1 km	MPC · JPL
242847	2006 EA_{40}	—	March 4, 2006	Kitt Peak	Spacewatch	·	2.1 km	MPC · JPL
242848	2006 EC_{43}	—	March 4, 2006	Catalina	CSS	·	4.6 km	MPC · JPL
242849	2006 EX_{59}	—	March 5, 2006	Kitt Peak	Spacewatch	·	1.5 km	MPC · JPL
242850	2006 FO_{5}	—	March 23, 2006	Mount Lemmon	Mount Lemmon Survey	·	1.4 km	MPC · JPL
242851	2006 FJ_{12}	—	March 23, 2006	Kitt Peak	Spacewatch	3:2 · SHU	7.2 km	MPC · JPL
242852	2006 FP_{18}	—	March 23, 2006	Kitt Peak	Spacewatch	·	1.8 km	MPC · JPL
242853	2006 FK_{45}	—	March 24, 2006	Anderson Mesa	LONEOS	·	3.1 km	MPC · JPL
242854	2006 FU_{49}	—	March 26, 2006	Anderson Mesa	LONEOS	HYG	4.9 km	MPC · JPL
242855	2006 FW_{52}	—	March 25, 2006	Mount Lemmon	Mount Lemmon Survey	PHO	1.4 km	MPC · JPL
242856	2006 FE_{53}	—	March 24, 2006	Mount Lemmon	Mount Lemmon Survey	·	1.5 km	MPC · JPL
242857	2006 FK_{53}	—	March 26, 2006	Kitt Peak	Spacewatch	·	2.1 km	MPC · JPL
242858	2006 GJ_{9}	—	April 2, 2006	Kitt Peak	Spacewatch	CLA	1.9 km	MPC · JPL
242859	2006 GW_{16}	—	April 2, 2006	Kitt Peak	Spacewatch	·	3.0 km	MPC · JPL
242860	2006 GW_{29}	—	April 2, 2006	Kitt Peak	Spacewatch	·	2.1 km	MPC · JPL
242861	2006 GE_{30}	—	April 2, 2006	Mount Lemmon	Mount Lemmon Survey	ADE	3.2 km	MPC · JPL
242862	2006 GA_{31}	—	April 2, 2006	Mount Lemmon	Mount Lemmon Survey	·	3.0 km	MPC · JPL
242863	2006 GZ_{39}	—	April 6, 2006	Socorro	LINEAR	·	2.4 km	MPC · JPL
242864	2006 GJ_{50}	—	April 9, 2006	Anderson Mesa	LONEOS	slow	2.3 km	MPC · JPL
242865	2006 HD_{4}	—	April 19, 2006	Anderson Mesa	LONEOS	·	2.0 km	MPC · JPL
242866	2006 HN_{13}	—	April 19, 2006	Anderson Mesa	LONEOS	·	3.8 km	MPC · JPL
242867	2006 HO_{15}	—	April 20, 2006	Kitt Peak	Spacewatch	·	5.2 km	MPC · JPL
242868	2006 HF_{23}	—	April 20, 2006	Kitt Peak	Spacewatch	·	1.1 km	MPC · JPL
242869	2006 HM_{45}	—	April 25, 2006	Kitt Peak	Spacewatch	·	1.6 km	MPC · JPL
242870	2006 HP_{47}	—	April 24, 2006	Kitt Peak	Spacewatch	·	3.6 km	MPC · JPL
242871	2006 HE_{49}	—	April 25, 2006	Kitt Peak	Spacewatch	·	1.0 km	MPC · JPL
242872	2006 HD_{50}	—	April 26, 2006	Kitt Peak	Spacewatch	·	1.5 km	MPC · JPL
242873	2006 HJ_{52}	—	April 18, 2006	Anderson Mesa	LONEOS	·	1.8 km	MPC · JPL
242874	2006 HX_{52}	—	April 19, 2006	Catalina	CSS	·	1.8 km	MPC · JPL
242875	2006 HR_{54}	—	April 21, 2006	Catalina	CSS	·	2.5 km	MPC · JPL
242876	2006 HT_{83}	—	April 26, 2006	Kitt Peak	Spacewatch	·	1.9 km	MPC · JPL
242877	2006 HY_{107}	—	April 30, 2006	Kitt Peak	Spacewatch	·	2.0 km	MPC · JPL
242878	2006 HF_{108}	—	April 30, 2006	Kitt Peak	Spacewatch	·	3.6 km	MPC · JPL
242879	2006 HP_{111}	—	April 29, 2006	Siding Spring	SSS	·	4.2 km	MPC · JPL
242880	2006 HC_{114}	—	April 25, 2006	Kitt Peak	Spacewatch	·	2.7 km	MPC · JPL
242881	2006 HO_{120}	—	April 30, 2006	Kitt Peak	Spacewatch	·	1.7 km	MPC · JPL
242882	2006 HT_{153}	—	April 26, 2006	Mount Lemmon	Mount Lemmon Survey	·	3.1 km	MPC · JPL
242883	2006 JH_{6}	—	May 2, 2006	Mount Nyukasa	Japan Aerospace Exploration Agency	·	2.5 km	MPC · JPL
242884	2006 JS_{7}	—	May 1, 2006	Kitt Peak	Spacewatch	·	2.2 km	MPC · JPL
242885	2006 JX_{11}	—	May 1, 2006	Kitt Peak	Spacewatch	·	3.1 km	MPC · JPL
242886	2006 JM_{13}	—	May 1, 2006	Kitt Peak	Spacewatch	·	3.0 km	MPC · JPL
242887	2006 JF_{35}	—	May 4, 2006	Kitt Peak	Spacewatch	·	2.8 km	MPC · JPL
242888	2006 JD_{41}	—	May 7, 2006	Mount Lemmon	Mount Lemmon Survey	·	2.4 km	MPC · JPL
242889	2006 JP_{47}	—	May 1, 2006	Socorro	LINEAR	·	3.2 km	MPC · JPL
242890	2006 JR_{47}	—	May 2, 2006	Catalina	CSS	·	1.6 km	MPC · JPL
242891	2006 JD_{57}	—	May 14, 2006	Palomar	NEAT	·	2.2 km	MPC · JPL
242892	2006 KX_{2}	—	May 18, 2006	Palomar	NEAT	·	3.2 km	MPC · JPL
242893	2006 KY_{16}	—	May 19, 2006	Anderson Mesa	LONEOS	PHO	1.4 km	MPC · JPL
242894	2006 KH_{38}	—	May 19, 2006	Catalina	CSS	·	1.9 km	MPC · JPL
242895	2006 KM_{40}	—	May 18, 2006	Palomar	NEAT	·	1.6 km	MPC · JPL
242896	2006 KB_{42}	—	May 20, 2006	Kitt Peak	Spacewatch	·	1.6 km	MPC · JPL
242897	2006 KH_{73}	—	May 23, 2006	Kitt Peak	Spacewatch	·	3.2 km	MPC · JPL
242898	2006 KS_{86}	—	May 27, 2006	Catalina	CSS	·	2.8 km	MPC · JPL
242899	2006 KY_{107}	—	May 31, 2006	Mount Lemmon	Mount Lemmon Survey	·	3.2 km	MPC · JPL
242900	2006 KM_{111}	—	May 31, 2006	Mount Lemmon	Mount Lemmon Survey	·	4.3 km	MPC · JPL

== 242901–243000 ==
back to top

Designation			Discovery			Properties		Ref
Permanent	Provisional	Named after	Date	Site	Discoverer(s)	Category	Diam.	Ref
242901	2006 KC_{113}	—	May 30, 2006	Catalina	CSS	PHO	2.9 km	MPC · JPL
242902	2006 KQ_{114}	—	May 26, 2006	Catalina	CSS	T_{j} (2.97)	8.1 km	MPC · JPL
242903	2006 KW_{114}	—	May 30, 2006	Socorro	LINEAR	·	2.5 km	MPC · JPL
242904	2006 KX_{118}	—	May 30, 2006	Kitt Peak	Spacewatch	·	6.4 km	MPC · JPL
242905	2006 KS_{122}	—	May 30, 2006	Siding Spring	SSS	·	4.4 km	MPC · JPL
242906	2006 KD_{144}	—	May 23, 2006	Kitt Peak	Spacewatch	·	2.7 km	MPC · JPL
242907	2006 LU	—	June 1, 2006	Catalina	CSS	·	2.3 km	MPC · JPL
242908	2006 LB_{4}	—	June 5, 2006	Socorro	LINEAR	(5)	1.8 km	MPC · JPL
242909	2006 LR_{4}	—	June 3, 2006	Siding Spring	SSS	·	6.4 km	MPC · JPL
242910	2006 MT_{2}	—	June 16, 2006	Kitt Peak	Spacewatch	·	3.3 km	MPC · JPL
242911	2006 MO_{8}	—	June 19, 2006	Catalina	CSS	JUN	2.6 km	MPC · JPL
242912	2006 MM_{11}	—	June 21, 2006	Kitt Peak	Spacewatch	·	1.7 km	MPC · JPL
242913	2006 MS_{13}	—	June 27, 2006	Hibiscus	S. F. Hönig	·	2.1 km	MPC · JPL
242914	2006 MU_{14}	—	June 21, 2006	Palomar	NEAT	·	4.5 km	MPC · JPL
242915	2006 NC_{1}	—	July 9, 2006	Vail-Jarnac	Jarnac	·	1.7 km	MPC · JPL
242916	2006 OS_{2}	—	July 19, 2006	Lulin	LUSS	·	2.4 km	MPC · JPL
242917	2006 OZ_{2}	—	July 19, 2006	Lulin	LUSS	L4	11 km	MPC · JPL
242918	2006 OM_{3}	—	July 19, 2006	Palomar	NEAT	·	1.9 km	MPC · JPL
242919	2006 OA_{7}	—	July 24, 2006	Eskridge	Farpoint	·	1.9 km	MPC · JPL
242920	2006 OB_{17}	—	July 21, 2006	Mount Lemmon	Mount Lemmon Survey	·	2.8 km	MPC · JPL
242921	2006 OR_{19}	—	July 20, 2006	Siding Spring	SSS	·	5.0 km	MPC · JPL
242922	2006 PZ_{1}	—	August 12, 2006	Palomar	NEAT	·	2.2 km	MPC · JPL
242923	2006 PP_{2}	—	August 12, 2006	Palomar	NEAT	·	2.2 km	MPC · JPL
242924	2006 PK_{22}	—	August 15, 2006	Lulin	Lin, C.-S., Q. Ye	·	5.9 km	MPC · JPL
242925	2006 QM_{15}	—	August 17, 2006	Palomar	NEAT	·	5.5 km	MPC · JPL
242926	2006 QA_{21}	—	August 19, 2006	Palomar	NEAT	·	2.5 km	MPC · JPL
242927	2006 QK_{28}	—	August 20, 2006	Siding Spring	SSS	·	4.6 km	MPC · JPL
242928	2006 QT_{42}	—	August 17, 2006	Palomar	NEAT	(18466)	3.0 km	MPC · JPL
242929	2006 QP_{44}	—	August 19, 2006	Anderson Mesa	LONEOS	AGN	2.0 km	MPC · JPL
242930	2006 QF_{46}	—	August 20, 2006	Palomar	NEAT	·	4.2 km	MPC · JPL
242931	2006 QM_{46}	—	August 20, 2006	Palomar	NEAT	(13314)	2.6 km	MPC · JPL
242932	2006 QH_{53}	—	August 23, 2006	Črni Vrh	Mikuž, H.	·	2.1 km	MPC · JPL
242933	2006 QJ_{53}	—	August 24, 2006	Socorro	LINEAR	·	3.2 km	MPC · JPL
242934	2006 QB_{59}	—	August 19, 2006	Anderson Mesa	LONEOS	·	5.4 km	MPC · JPL
242935	2006 QE_{61}	—	August 21, 2006	Palomar	NEAT	·	2.8 km	MPC · JPL
242936	2006 QJ_{66}	—	August 21, 2006	Palomar	NEAT	·	2.0 km	MPC · JPL
242937	2006 QT_{70}	—	August 21, 2006	Kitt Peak	Spacewatch	·	1.9 km	MPC · JPL
242938	2006 QR_{108}	—	August 28, 2006	Catalina	CSS	DOR	3.4 km	MPC · JPL
242939	2006 QN_{120}	—	August 29, 2006	Catalina	CSS	GEF ·	3.2 km	MPC · JPL
242940	2006 QT_{165}	—	August 29, 2006	Catalina	CSS	·	3.5 km	MPC · JPL
242941	2006 QE_{168}	—	August 30, 2006	Anderson Mesa	LONEOS	·	4.7 km	MPC · JPL
242942	2006 QY_{183}	—	August 17, 2006	Palomar	NEAT	ULA · CYB	6.9 km	MPC · JPL
242943	2006 RX_{14}	—	September 14, 2006	Kitt Peak	Spacewatch	·	3.5 km	MPC · JPL
242944	2006 RP_{32}	—	September 15, 2006	Kitt Peak	Spacewatch	KON	2.3 km	MPC · JPL
242945	2006 RB_{36}	—	September 14, 2006	Palomar	NEAT	EOS	2.9 km	MPC · JPL
242946	2006 RY_{38}	—	September 14, 2006	Catalina	CSS	·	5.2 km	MPC · JPL
242947	2006 RE_{44}	—	September 14, 2006	Kitt Peak	Spacewatch	CYB	5.5 km	MPC · JPL
242948	2006 RJ_{46}	—	September 14, 2006	Kitt Peak	Spacewatch	·	6.3 km	MPC · JPL
242949	2006 RE_{59}	—	September 15, 2006	Kitt Peak	Spacewatch	·	3.0 km	MPC · JPL
242950	2006 RB_{69}	—	September 15, 2006	Kitt Peak	Spacewatch	·	3.4 km	MPC · JPL
242951	2006 RX_{90}	—	September 15, 2006	Kitt Peak	Spacewatch	·	3.1 km	MPC · JPL
242952	2006 RE_{121}	—	September 6, 2006	Palomar	NEAT	·	3.7 km	MPC · JPL
242953	2006 SG_{5}	—	September 16, 2006	Palomar	NEAT	T_{j} (2.98)	4.9 km	MPC · JPL
242954	2006 ST_{11}	—	September 16, 2006	Catalina	CSS	·	2.4 km	MPC · JPL
242955	2006 SX_{14}	—	September 17, 2006	Catalina	CSS	·	3.6 km	MPC · JPL
242956	2006 SE_{23}	—	September 17, 2006	Anderson Mesa	LONEOS	EOS	3.1 km	MPC · JPL
242957	2006 SJ_{27}	—	September 16, 2006	Catalina	CSS	·	5.0 km	MPC · JPL
242958	2006 SJ_{29}	—	September 17, 2006	Kitt Peak	Spacewatch	·	5.2 km	MPC · JPL
242959	2006 SF_{32}	—	September 17, 2006	Kitt Peak	Spacewatch	VER	5.4 km	MPC · JPL
242960	2006 SN_{41}	—	September 18, 2006	Kitt Peak	Spacewatch	·	4.6 km	MPC · JPL
242961	2006 SA_{43}	—	September 18, 2006	Catalina	CSS	·	3.7 km	MPC · JPL
242962	2006 SP_{49}	—	September 19, 2006	Calvin-Rehoboth	Calvin College	·	3.7 km	MPC · JPL
242963	2006 SS_{50}	—	September 16, 2006	Catalina	CSS	·	3.4 km	MPC · JPL
242964	2006 SZ_{66}	—	September 19, 2006	Kitt Peak	Spacewatch	·	4.3 km	MPC · JPL
242965	2006 SW_{67}	—	September 19, 2006	Kitt Peak	Spacewatch	·	1.9 km	MPC · JPL
242966	2006 SW_{79}	—	September 17, 2006	Catalina	CSS	CYB	7.1 km	MPC · JPL
242967	2006 ST_{83}	—	September 18, 2006	Kitt Peak	Spacewatch	·	4.1 km	MPC · JPL
242968	2006 SA_{105}	—	September 19, 2006	Catalina	CSS	·	4.2 km	MPC · JPL
242969	2006 SW_{111}	—	September 22, 2006	Catalina	CSS	·	2.6 km	MPC · JPL
242970	2006 SR_{112}	—	September 23, 2006	Kitt Peak	Spacewatch	·	5.3 km	MPC · JPL
242971	2006 SC_{116}	—	September 24, 2006	Anderson Mesa	LONEOS	·	5.0 km	MPC · JPL
242972	2006 SN_{120}	—	September 18, 2006	Catalina	CSS	VER	4.0 km	MPC · JPL
242973	2006 SU_{120}	—	September 18, 2006	Catalina	CSS	·	3.6 km	MPC · JPL
242974	2006 SP_{123}	—	September 19, 2006	Catalina	CSS	·	3.3 km	MPC · JPL
242975	2006 SG_{126}	—	September 21, 2006	Uccle	T. Pauwels	EOS	3.1 km	MPC · JPL
242976	2006 SJ_{137}	—	September 20, 2006	Catalina	CSS	EUN	1.7 km	MPC · JPL
242977	2006 SR_{169}	—	September 25, 2006	Kitt Peak	Spacewatch	HYG	3.4 km	MPC · JPL
242978	2006 SF_{178}	—	September 25, 2006	Mount Lemmon	Mount Lemmon Survey	·	4.1 km	MPC · JPL
242979	2006 SV_{188}	—	September 26, 2006	Catalina	CSS	TIR ·	5.2 km	MPC · JPL
242980	2006 ST_{212}	—	September 26, 2006	Catalina	CSS	·	4.6 km	MPC · JPL
242981	2006 SZ_{231}	—	September 26, 2006	Kitt Peak	Spacewatch	·	6.0 km	MPC · JPL
242982	2006 SZ_{240}	—	September 26, 2006	Kitt Peak	Spacewatch	·	2.8 km	MPC · JPL
242983	2006 SW_{267}	—	September 26, 2006	Kitt Peak	Spacewatch	·	3.1 km	MPC · JPL
242984	2006 SZ_{274}	—	September 27, 2006	Kitt Peak	Spacewatch	·	1.8 km	MPC · JPL
242985	2006 SK_{278}	—	September 28, 2006	Mount Lemmon	Mount Lemmon Survey	·	6.3 km	MPC · JPL
242986	2006 SW_{322}	—	September 27, 2006	Kitt Peak	Spacewatch	·	2.9 km	MPC · JPL
242987	2006 SL_{328}	—	September 27, 2006	Kitt Peak	Spacewatch	·	1.5 km	MPC · JPL
242988	2006 SM_{360}	—	September 30, 2006	Mount Lemmon	Mount Lemmon Survey	·	3.7 km	MPC · JPL
242989	2006 SW_{366}	—	September 17, 2006	Catalina	CSS	·	5.1 km	MPC · JPL
242990	2006 SB_{367}	—	September 24, 2006	Anderson Mesa	LONEOS	·	1.8 km	MPC · JPL
242991	2006 SJ_{391}	—	September 18, 2006	Anderson Mesa	LONEOS	·	4.3 km	MPC · JPL
242992	2006 SK_{392}	—	September 25, 2006	Catalina	CSS	·	6.2 km	MPC · JPL
242993	2006 ST_{399}	—	September 18, 2006	Catalina	CSS	·	3.9 km	MPC · JPL
242994	2006 SX_{412}	—	September 17, 2006	Catalina	CSS	MAR	2.3 km	MPC · JPL
242995	2006 TS_{8}	—	October 11, 2006	Kitt Peak	Spacewatch	·	3.5 km	MPC · JPL
242996	2006 TE_{9}	—	October 11, 2006	Kitt Peak	Spacewatch	3:2	7.8 km	MPC · JPL
242997	2006 TL_{29}	—	October 12, 2006	Kitt Peak	Spacewatch	·	3.8 km	MPC · JPL
242998	2006 TB_{34}	—	October 12, 2006	Palomar	NEAT	·	2.4 km	MPC · JPL
242999	2006 TN_{96}	—	October 12, 2006	Palomar	NEAT	·	3.3 km	MPC · JPL
243000 Katysirles	2006 TB_{112}	Katysirles	October 1, 2006	Apache Point	A. C. Becker	·	4.4 km	MPC · JPL

back to top

== See also ==
- Meanings of minor-planet names: 242001–243000
