= Meanings of minor-planet names: 239001–240000 =

As minor planet discoveries are confirmed, they are given a permanent number by the IAU's Minor Planet Center (MPC), and the discoverers can then submit names for them, following the IAU's naming conventions. The list below concerns those minor planets in the specified number-range that have received names, and explains the meanings of those names.

Official naming citations of newly named small Solar System bodies are approved and published in a bulletin by IAU's Working Group for Small Bodies Nomenclature (WGSBN). Before May 2021, citations were published in MPC's Minor Planet Circulars for many decades. Recent citations can also be found on the JPL Small-Body Database (SBDB). Until his death in 2016, German astronomer Lutz D. Schmadel compiled these citations into the Dictionary of Minor Planet Names (DMP) and regularly updated the collection.

Based on Paul Herget's The Names of the Minor Planets, Schmadel also researched the unclear origin of numerous asteroids, most of which had been named prior to World War II. This article incorporates text from this source, which is in the public domain: SBDB New namings may only be added to this list below after official publication as the preannouncement of names is condemned. The WGSBN publishes a comprehensive guideline for the naming rules of non-cometary small Solar System bodies.

== 239001–239100 ==
Named minor planet	Provisional	This minor planet was named for...	Ref · Catalog
239046 Judysyd	2006 DQ_{212}	Judith J. Levine (born 1937) and Sydney P. Levine (born 1933), orthopedic surgeon and maritime economic consultant respectively, supported and nurtured the creative and scientific aspirations of their children, one of whom discovered this asteroid.	JPL · 239046
239071 Penghu	2006 GF	The Taiwanese archipelago of Penghu, the country's only island county consisting of 64 small islands	JPL · 239071

== 239101–239200 ==
back to top

Named minor planet	Provisional	This minor planet was named for...	Ref · Catalog
239105 Marcocattaneo	2006 HP_{57}	Marco Cattaneo (born 1963), a science journalist and director of the Italian edition of Scientific American.	JPL · 239105
239126 Tommygreathouse	2006 HY_{146}	Thomas K. Greathouse (born 1975), American planetary scientist and member of the Alice UV spectrograph instrument team for New Horizons.	JPL · 239126
239200 Luoyang	2006 MD_{13}	Luoyang, an ancient city situated on the central plain of China.	JPL · 239200

== 239201–239300 ==
back to top

Named minor planet	Provisional	This minor planet was named for...	Ref · Catalog
239203 Simeon	2006 OK_{14}	Simeon I of Bulgaria (864–927), who ruled over Bulgaria from 893 to 927.	JPL · 239203
239254 Gabbigriffith	2006 UL_{323}	Gabrielle A. Griffith (born 1964), American systems engineer.	JPL · 239254
239282 Kevinmccarron	2007 OC_{8}	Kevin McCarron (born 1959) is a retired high school astronomy & physics teacher at Oak Park and River Forest, Illinois, as well as an educator at Yerkes Observatory. He advances initiatives for diversity in STEM opportunities for people of color, females, the deaf and hard of hearing, as well as youth who are blind or deafblind.	JPL · 239282

== 239301–239400 ==
back to top

Named minor planet	Provisional	This minor planet was named for...	Ref · Catalog
239307 Kruchynenko	2007 QS_{3}	Vitaliy Grygorovych Kruchynenko (born 1934), professor of physics and mathematics and researcher on meteors and comets	JPL · 239307

== 239401–239500 ==
back to top

Named minor planet	Provisional	This minor planet was named for...	Ref · Catalog
There are no named minor planets in this number range

== 239501–239600 ==
back to top

Named minor planet	Provisional	This minor planet was named for...	Ref · Catalog
239593 Tianwenbang	2008 UD_{55}	Tianwenbang, an alliance of the astronomy clubs of several senior high schools in Kaohsiung, Taiwan	JPL · 239593

== 239601–239700 ==
back to top

Named minor planet	Provisional	This minor planet was named for...	Ref · Catalog
239611 Likwohting	2008 UC_{212}	Kwoh-Ting Li (born 1911) was trained as a physicist but became the mastermind of Taiwan's industrial revolution and economic miracle between 1960 and 1990.	JPL · 239611
239645 Shandongas	2008 WQ_{58}	ShandongAS is the abbreviation of Shandong Astronomical Society (SAS). Shandong province is the origin of astronomical education and scientific research in modern China. SAS is a new organization founded in 2021. Its mission is to serve astronomers, astronomical educators and amateurs and promote the development of astronomy.	IAU · 239645
239672 SOFIA	2008 YS_{1}	The Stratospheric Observatory for Infrared Astronomy (SOFIA) is a joint German-US air-borne observatory. With its 2.5-meter telescope on board a Boeing 747SP aircraft, it allows infrared and sub-millimeter observations from above earth's troposphere, leaving most of the atmospheric water vapor below.	JPL · 239672
239675 Mottez	2008 YW24	Fabrice Mottez (born 1963), a French astrophysicist at the Paris Observatory	JPL · 239675

== 239701–239800 ==
back to top

Named minor planet	Provisional	This minor planet was named for...	Ref · Catalog
239716 Felixbaumgartner	2009 BF_{12}	Felix Baumgartner (born 1969), an Austrian skydiver, extreme athlete and BASE jumper	JPL · 239716
239792 Hankakováčová	2010 EM_{34}	Hanka Kovácová (born 1986), a director and dramaturgist.	JPL · 239792

== 239801–239900 ==
back to top

Named minor planet	Provisional	This minor planet was named for...	Ref · Catalog
239890 Edudeldon	2000 RX_{11}	Eduardo Delgado Donate (1977–2007), an astrophysicist who mainly studied the formation of multiple-star and brown-dwarf systems.	JPL · 239890

== 239901–240000 ==
back to top

Named minor planet	Provisional	This minor planet was named for...	Ref · Catalog
There are no named minor planets in this number range

back to top

Preceded by 238,001–239,000	Meanings of minor-planet names List of minor planets: 239,001–240,000	Succeeded by 240,001–241,000
