= List of minor planets: 239001–240000 =

The following is a partial list of minor planets, running from minor-planet number 239001 through 240000, inclusive. The primary data for this and other partial lists is based on JPL's "Small-Body Orbital Elements" and data available from the Minor Planet Center. Critical list information is also provided by the MPC, unless otherwise specified from Lowell Observatory. A detailed description of the table's columns and additional sources are given on the main page including a complete list of every page in this series, and a statistical break-up on the dynamical classification of minor planets.

Also see the summary list of all named bodies in numerical and alphabetical order, and the corresponding naming citations for the number range of this particular list. New namings may only be added to this list after official publication, as the preannouncement of names is condemned by the Working Group for Small Bodies Nomenclature of the International Astronomical Union.

Near-Earth obj.	MBA (inner)	MBA (outer)	Centaur
Mars-crosser	MBA (middle)	Jupiter trojan	Trans-Neptunian obj.
Unclassified

== 239001–239100 ==
Designation			Discovery			Properties		Ref
Permanent	Provisional	Named after	Date	Site	Discoverer(s)	Category	Diam.	Ref
239001	2006 CG_{49}	—	February 3, 2006	Socorro	LINEAR	·	1.4 km	MPC · JPL
239002	2006 CL_{50}	—	February 3, 2006	Mount Lemmon	Mount Lemmon Survey	·	2.2 km	MPC · JPL
239003	2006 CX_{61}	—	February 3, 2006	Mount Lemmon	Mount Lemmon Survey	·	1.5 km	MPC · JPL
239004	2006 DT_{5}	—	February 20, 2006	Mount Lemmon	Mount Lemmon Survey	·	2.1 km	MPC · JPL
239005	2006 DY_{5}	—	February 20, 2006	Catalina	CSS	NYS ·	3.4 km	MPC · JPL
239006	2006 DH_{8}	—	February 20, 2006	Mount Lemmon	Mount Lemmon Survey	PHO	3.8 km	MPC · JPL
239007	2006 DA_{21}	—	February 20, 2006	Catalina	CSS	·	2.1 km	MPC · JPL
239008	2006 DW_{21}	—	February 20, 2006	Kitt Peak	Spacewatch	MAS	1.3 km	MPC · JPL
239009	2006 DW_{22}	—	February 20, 2006	Kitt Peak	Spacewatch	HOF	3.3 km	MPC · JPL
239010	2006 DE_{24}	—	February 20, 2006	Kitt Peak	Spacewatch	·	1.1 km	MPC · JPL
239011	2006 DC_{26}	—	February 20, 2006	Mount Lemmon	Mount Lemmon Survey	·	1.6 km	MPC · JPL
239012	2006 DZ_{47}	—	February 21, 2006	Mount Lemmon	Mount Lemmon Survey	·	1.6 km	MPC · JPL
239013	2006 DH_{48}	—	February 21, 2006	Mount Lemmon	Mount Lemmon Survey	NYS	1.4 km	MPC · JPL
239014	2006 DW_{52}	—	February 24, 2006	Catalina	CSS	·	2.5 km	MPC · JPL
239015	2006 DE_{70}	—	February 20, 2006	Mount Lemmon	Mount Lemmon Survey	·	1.3 km	MPC · JPL
239016	2006 DA_{73}	—	February 22, 2006	Socorro	LINEAR	·	2.9 km	MPC · JPL
239017	2006 DV_{81}	—	February 24, 2006	Kitt Peak	Spacewatch	·	1.3 km	MPC · JPL
239018	2006 DC_{82}	—	February 24, 2006	Kitt Peak	Spacewatch	V	940 m	MPC · JPL
239019	2006 DK_{94}	—	February 24, 2006	Kitt Peak	Spacewatch	·	1.2 km	MPC · JPL
239020	2006 DR_{102}	—	February 25, 2006	Mount Lemmon	Mount Lemmon Survey	V	1.0 km	MPC · JPL
239021	2006 DH_{104}	—	February 25, 2006	Kitt Peak	Spacewatch	·	1.4 km	MPC · JPL
239022	2006 DD_{107}	—	February 25, 2006	Mount Lemmon	Mount Lemmon Survey	·	1.7 km	MPC · JPL
239023	2006 DC_{108}	—	February 25, 2006	Kitt Peak	Spacewatch	·	2.8 km	MPC · JPL
239024	2006 DC_{110}	—	February 25, 2006	Socorro	LINEAR	·	4.0 km	MPC · JPL
239025	2006 DF_{110}	—	February 25, 2006	Mount Lemmon	Mount Lemmon Survey	·	3.3 km	MPC · JPL
239026	2006 DX_{113}	—	February 27, 2006	Kitt Peak	Spacewatch	·	2.7 km	MPC · JPL
239027	2006 DN_{116}	—	February 27, 2006	Kitt Peak	Spacewatch	DOR	3.8 km	MPC · JPL
239028	2006 DY_{120}	—	February 22, 2006	Catalina	CSS	·	1.7 km	MPC · JPL
239029	2006 DO_{121}	—	February 22, 2006	Anderson Mesa	LONEOS	V	910 m	MPC · JPL
239030	2006 DP_{123}	—	February 24, 2006	Mount Lemmon	Mount Lemmon Survey	NYS	1.3 km	MPC · JPL
239031	2006 DT_{126}	—	February 25, 2006	Kitt Peak	Spacewatch	·	1.5 km	MPC · JPL
239032	2006 DM_{134}	—	February 25, 2006	Kitt Peak	Spacewatch	·	1.7 km	MPC · JPL
239033	2006 DY_{138}	—	February 25, 2006	Kitt Peak	Spacewatch	·	1.3 km	MPC · JPL
239034	2006 DO_{139}	—	February 25, 2006	Kitt Peak	Spacewatch	·	3.0 km	MPC · JPL
239035	2006 DZ_{145}	—	February 25, 2006	Mount Lemmon	Mount Lemmon Survey	(5)	1.8 km	MPC · JPL
239036	2006 DS_{147}	—	February 25, 2006	Kitt Peak	Spacewatch	·	2.3 km	MPC · JPL
239037	2006 DH_{148}	—	February 25, 2006	Kitt Peak	Spacewatch	NYS	1.5 km	MPC · JPL
239038	2006 DZ_{160}	—	February 27, 2006	Kitt Peak	Spacewatch	·	1.3 km	MPC · JPL
239039	2006 DK_{175}	—	February 27, 2006	Socorro	LINEAR	NYS	1.3 km	MPC · JPL
239040	2006 DJ_{187}	—	February 27, 2006	Kitt Peak	Spacewatch	MAS	900 m	MPC · JPL
239041	2006 DO_{190}	—	February 27, 2006	Kitt Peak	Spacewatch	·	1.7 km	MPC · JPL
239042	2006 DB_{193}	—	February 27, 2006	Kitt Peak	Spacewatch	NYS	1.4 km	MPC · JPL
239043	2006 DH_{198}	—	February 26, 2006	Anderson Mesa	LONEOS	PHO	2.8 km	MPC · JPL
239044	2006 DX_{201}	—	February 20, 2006	Socorro	LINEAR	PHO	1.6 km	MPC · JPL
239045	2006 DV_{202}	—	February 22, 2006	Catalina	CSS	·	1.6 km	MPC · JPL
239046 Judysyd	2006 DQ_{212}	Judysyd	February 25, 2006	Flagstaff USNO	Levine, S., A. Henden	·	1.9 km	MPC · JPL
239047	2006 DO_{214}	—	February 27, 2006	Kitt Peak	Spacewatch	·	1.5 km	MPC · JPL
239048	2006 EV_{16}	—	March 2, 2006	Mount Lemmon	Mount Lemmon Survey	MAS	1.1 km	MPC · JPL
239049	2006 ET_{37}	—	March 4, 2006	Anderson Mesa	LONEOS	·	1.7 km	MPC · JPL
239050	2006 ED_{41}	—	March 4, 2006	Kitt Peak	Spacewatch	·	1.7 km	MPC · JPL
239051	2006 EU_{41}	—	March 4, 2006	Catalina	CSS	·	3.9 km	MPC · JPL
239052	2006 EF_{46}	—	March 4, 2006	Kitt Peak	Spacewatch	·	1.2 km	MPC · JPL
239053	2006 EX_{48}	—	March 4, 2006	Kitt Peak	Spacewatch	·	1.1 km	MPC · JPL
239054	2006 EU_{51}	—	March 4, 2006	Kitt Peak	Spacewatch	·	1.2 km	MPC · JPL
239055	2006 EH_{53}	—	March 5, 2006	Catalina	CSS	BAR	2.8 km	MPC · JPL
239056	2006 EA_{60}	—	March 5, 2006	Kitt Peak	Spacewatch	·	1.8 km	MPC · JPL
239057	2006 FO_{4}	—	March 23, 2006	Kitt Peak	Spacewatch	·	2.7 km	MPC · JPL
239058	2006 FW_{9}	—	March 24, 2006	Mount Lemmon	Mount Lemmon Survey	AST	3.1 km	MPC · JPL
239059	2006 FA_{17}	—	March 23, 2006	Kitt Peak	Spacewatch	·	1.8 km	MPC · JPL
239060	2006 FV_{24}	—	March 24, 2006	Kitt Peak	Spacewatch	·	1.6 km	MPC · JPL
239061	2006 FF_{32}	—	March 25, 2006	Mount Lemmon	Mount Lemmon Survey	·	1.3 km	MPC · JPL
239062	2006 FA_{37}	—	March 23, 2006	Catalina	CSS	JUN	1.9 km	MPC · JPL
239063	2006 FW_{39}	—	March 25, 2006	Kitt Peak	Spacewatch	·	1.3 km	MPC · JPL
239064	2006 FA_{42}	—	March 26, 2006	Mount Lemmon	Mount Lemmon Survey	·	2.0 km	MPC · JPL
239065	2006 FD_{48}	—	March 24, 2006	Anderson Mesa	LONEOS	·	1.9 km	MPC · JPL
239066	2006 FY_{49}	—	March 26, 2006	Anderson Mesa	LONEOS	NYS	1.6 km	MPC · JPL
239067	2006 FC_{50}	—	March 31, 2006	Kitt Peak	Spacewatch	HOF	4.3 km	MPC · JPL
239068	2006 FC_{53}	—	March 23, 2006	Mount Lemmon	Mount Lemmon Survey	(5)	2.3 km	MPC · JPL
239069	2006 FY_{53}	—	March 26, 2006	Mount Lemmon	Mount Lemmon Survey	·	1.3 km	MPC · JPL
239070	2006 FO_{54}	—	March 25, 2006	Kitt Peak	Spacewatch	MAR	1.5 km	MPC · JPL
239071 Penghu	2006 GF	Penghu	April 1, 2006	Lulin	Lin, H.-C., Q. Ye	SUL	2.6 km	MPC · JPL
239072	2006 GL_{14}	—	April 2, 2006	Kitt Peak	Spacewatch	·	2.8 km	MPC · JPL
239073	2006 GY_{14}	—	April 2, 2006	Kitt Peak	Spacewatch	·	2.3 km	MPC · JPL
239074	2006 GG_{16}	—	April 2, 2006	Kitt Peak	Spacewatch	·	1.9 km	MPC · JPL
239075	2006 GK_{19}	—	April 2, 2006	Kitt Peak	Spacewatch	·	1.6 km	MPC · JPL
239076	2006 GF_{28}	—	April 2, 2006	Kitt Peak	Spacewatch	·	1.6 km	MPC · JPL
239077	2006 GP_{31}	—	April 2, 2006	Kitt Peak	Spacewatch	·	1.7 km	MPC · JPL
239078	2006 GX_{36}	—	April 8, 2006	Mount Lemmon	Mount Lemmon Survey	KOR ·	3.2 km	MPC · JPL
239079	2006 GN_{40}	—	April 6, 2006	Catalina	CSS	·	2.8 km	MPC · JPL
239080	2006 GB_{45}	—	April 7, 2006	Mount Lemmon	Mount Lemmon Survey	MAS	970 m	MPC · JPL
239081	2006 GM_{49}	—	April 6, 2006	Siding Spring	SSS	JUN	2.1 km	MPC · JPL
239082	2006 GG_{51}	—	April 2, 2006	Catalina	CSS	·	2.6 km	MPC · JPL
239083	2006 GJ_{51}	—	April 6, 2006	Socorro	LINEAR	·	1.4 km	MPC · JPL
239084	2006 GY_{52}	—	April 9, 2006	Kitt Peak	Spacewatch	·	1.8 km	MPC · JPL
239085	2006 GZ_{53}	—	April 7, 2006	Kitt Peak	Spacewatch	·	1.9 km	MPC · JPL
239086	2006 HO_{3}	—	April 18, 2006	Anderson Mesa	LONEOS	BAR	1.5 km	MPC · JPL
239087	2006 HY_{10}	—	April 19, 2006	Kitt Peak	Spacewatch	·	1.9 km	MPC · JPL
239088	2006 HW_{14}	—	April 19, 2006	Mount Lemmon	Mount Lemmon Survey	·	1.3 km	MPC · JPL
239089	2006 HA_{19}	—	April 18, 2006	Kitt Peak	Spacewatch	·	1.3 km	MPC · JPL
239090	2006 HJ_{19}	—	April 18, 2006	Kitt Peak	Spacewatch	·	1.6 km	MPC · JPL
239091	2006 HA_{27}	—	April 20, 2006	Kitt Peak	Spacewatch	·	2.1 km	MPC · JPL
239092	2006 HT_{35}	—	April 19, 2006	Palomar	NEAT	·	1.7 km	MPC · JPL
239093	2006 HP_{38}	—	April 21, 2006	Kitt Peak	Spacewatch	·	2.1 km	MPC · JPL
239094	2006 HY_{38}	—	April 21, 2006	Kitt Peak	Spacewatch	·	1.5 km	MPC · JPL
239095	2006 HE_{39}	—	April 21, 2006	Kitt Peak	Spacewatch	·	2.0 km	MPC · JPL
239096	2006 HF_{44}	—	April 24, 2006	Mount Lemmon	Mount Lemmon Survey	·	1.7 km	MPC · JPL
239097	2006 HR_{47}	—	April 24, 2006	Kitt Peak	Spacewatch	·	2.8 km	MPC · JPL
239098	2006 HC_{48}	—	April 24, 2006	Kitt Peak	Spacewatch	·	1.8 km	MPC · JPL
239099	2006 HX_{48}	—	April 24, 2006	Anderson Mesa	LONEOS	·	2.3 km	MPC · JPL
239100	2006 HZ_{49}	—	April 26, 2006	Kitt Peak	Spacewatch	·	1.6 km	MPC · JPL

== 239101–239200 ==
back to top

Designation			Discovery			Properties		Ref
Permanent	Provisional	Named after	Date	Site	Discoverer(s)	Category	Diam.	Ref
239101	2006 HN_{53}	—	April 19, 2006	Catalina	CSS	·	2.2 km	MPC · JPL
239102	2006 HU_{54}	—	April 21, 2006	Catalina	CSS	HNS	2.5 km	MPC · JPL
239103	2006 HB_{56}	—	April 22, 2006	Siding Spring	SSS	EUN	2.1 km	MPC · JPL
239104	2006 HN_{56}	—	April 19, 2006	Anderson Mesa	LONEOS	·	1.2 km	MPC · JPL
239105 Marcocattaneo	2006 HP_{57}	Marcocattaneo	April 28, 2006	Vallemare Borbona	V. S. Casulli	·	1.8 km	MPC · JPL
239106	2006 HA_{58}	—	April 29, 2006	Marly	P. Kocher	·	2.8 km	MPC · JPL
239107	2006 HH_{58}	—	April 23, 2006	Anderson Mesa	LONEOS	·	2.7 km	MPC · JPL
239108	2006 HN_{75}	—	April 25, 2006	Kitt Peak	Spacewatch	·	1.9 km	MPC · JPL
239109	2006 HL_{77}	—	April 25, 2006	Kitt Peak	Spacewatch	·	3.8 km	MPC · JPL
239110	2006 HJ_{80}	—	April 26, 2006	Kitt Peak	Spacewatch	·	2.3 km	MPC · JPL
239111	2006 HQ_{80}	—	April 26, 2006	Kitt Peak	Spacewatch	·	2.7 km	MPC · JPL
239112	2006 HD_{81}	—	April 26, 2006	Kitt Peak	Spacewatch	·	2.9 km	MPC · JPL
239113	2006 HY_{86}	—	April 29, 2006	Kitt Peak	Spacewatch	·	1.9 km	MPC · JPL
239114	2006 HY_{89}	—	April 26, 2006	Anderson Mesa	LONEOS	·	2.9 km	MPC · JPL
239115	2006 HR_{93}	—	April 29, 2006	Kitt Peak	Spacewatch	·	2.3 km	MPC · JPL
239116	2006 HZ_{93}	—	April 29, 2006	Kitt Peak	Spacewatch	·	3.6 km	MPC · JPL
239117	2006 HM_{94}	—	April 29, 2006	Kitt Peak	Spacewatch	·	5.2 km	MPC · JPL
239118	2006 HD_{102}	—	April 30, 2006	Kitt Peak	Spacewatch	·	1.8 km	MPC · JPL
239119	2006 HR_{103}	—	April 30, 2006	Kitt Peak	Spacewatch	·	2.7 km	MPC · JPL
239120	2006 HH_{105}	—	April 25, 2006	Catalina	CSS	·	4.1 km	MPC · JPL
239121	2006 HM_{111}	—	April 26, 2006	Siding Spring	SSS	·	1.6 km	MPC · JPL
239122	2006 HG_{113}	—	April 25, 2006	Kitt Peak	Spacewatch	KON	4.3 km	MPC · JPL
239123	2006 HF_{114}	—	April 25, 2006	Mount Lemmon	Mount Lemmon Survey	ADE	3.8 km	MPC · JPL
239124	2006 HA_{117}	—	April 26, 2006	Kitt Peak	Spacewatch	·	2.3 km	MPC · JPL
239125	2006 HF_{120}	—	April 30, 2006	Kitt Peak	Spacewatch	·	2.1 km	MPC · JPL
239126 Tommygreathouse	2006 HY_{146}	Tommygreathouse	April 27, 2006	Cerro Tololo	M. W. Buie	·	2.8 km	MPC · JPL
239127	2006 HW_{152}	—	April 30, 2006	Kitt Peak	Spacewatch	·	2.1 km	MPC · JPL
239128	2006 JU_{2}	—	May 2, 2006	Mount Lemmon	Mount Lemmon Survey	(5)	1.2 km	MPC · JPL
239129	2006 JC_{5}	—	May 3, 2006	Mount Lemmon	Mount Lemmon Survey	·	1.5 km	MPC · JPL
239130	2006 JE_{6}	—	May 2, 2006	Mount Nyukasa	Japan Aerospace Exploration Agency	·	1.4 km	MPC · JPL
239131	2006 JA_{9}	—	May 1, 2006	Kitt Peak	Spacewatch	·	1.4 km	MPC · JPL
239132	2006 JE_{13}	—	May 1, 2006	Kitt Peak	Spacewatch	·	2.8 km	MPC · JPL
239133	2006 JW_{18}	—	May 2, 2006	Mount Lemmon	Mount Lemmon Survey	PAD	2.0 km	MPC · JPL
239134	2006 JX_{18}	—	May 2, 2006	Mount Lemmon	Mount Lemmon Survey	·	3.4 km	MPC · JPL
239135	2006 JZ_{27}	—	May 2, 2006	Mount Lemmon	Mount Lemmon Survey	·	1.4 km	MPC · JPL
239136	2006 JR_{28}	—	May 3, 2006	Kitt Peak	Spacewatch	·	2.5 km	MPC · JPL
239137	2006 JB_{30}	—	May 3, 2006	Kitt Peak	Spacewatch	(5)	1.9 km	MPC · JPL
239138	2006 JJ_{30}	—	May 3, 2006	Kitt Peak	Spacewatch	·	2.0 km	MPC · JPL
239139	2006 JR_{34}	—	May 4, 2006	Kitt Peak	Spacewatch	·	1.8 km	MPC · JPL
239140	2006 JW_{35}	—	May 4, 2006	Kitt Peak	Spacewatch	·	2.6 km	MPC · JPL
239141	2006 JC_{40}	—	May 6, 2006	Kitt Peak	Spacewatch	·	3.1 km	MPC · JPL
239142	2006 JS_{41}	—	May 7, 2006	Kitt Peak	Spacewatch	·	3.8 km	MPC · JPL
239143	2006 JQ_{43}	—	May 5, 2006	Kitt Peak	Spacewatch	·	1.4 km	MPC · JPL
239144	2006 JP_{44}	—	May 6, 2006	Kitt Peak	Spacewatch	·	2.1 km	MPC · JPL
239145	2006 JA_{45}	—	May 7, 2006	Mount Lemmon	Mount Lemmon Survey	·	1.7 km	MPC · JPL
239146	2006 JZ_{45}	—	May 9, 2006	Mount Lemmon	Mount Lemmon Survey	·	1.6 km	MPC · JPL
239147	2006 JT_{48}	—	May 8, 2006	Siding Spring	SSS	ADE	1.9 km	MPC · JPL
239148	2006 JD_{53}	—	May 6, 2006	Mount Lemmon	Mount Lemmon Survey	·	1.9 km	MPC · JPL
239149	2006 JJ_{55}	—	May 9, 2006	Mount Lemmon	Mount Lemmon Survey	·	2.1 km	MPC · JPL
239150	2006 JK_{58}	—	May 5, 2006	Anderson Mesa	LONEOS	·	1.6 km	MPC · JPL
239151	2006 KX	—	May 18, 2006	Palomar	NEAT	·	2.1 km	MPC · JPL
239152	2006 KD_{9}	—	May 19, 2006	Mount Lemmon	Mount Lemmon Survey	AST	3.0 km	MPC · JPL
239153	2006 KS_{9}	—	May 19, 2006	Catalina	CSS	·	4.0 km	MPC · JPL
239154	2006 KX_{9}	—	May 19, 2006	Catalina	CSS	·	2.2 km	MPC · JPL
239155	2006 KK_{11}	—	May 19, 2006	Mount Lemmon	Mount Lemmon Survey	EUN	1.7 km	MPC · JPL
239156	2006 KR_{15}	—	May 20, 2006	Kitt Peak	Spacewatch	·	1.9 km	MPC · JPL
239157	2006 KC_{16}	—	May 20, 2006	Palomar	NEAT	·	1.8 km	MPC · JPL
239158	2006 KH_{17}	—	May 20, 2006	Mount Lemmon	Mount Lemmon Survey	EUN	1.9 km	MPC · JPL
239159	2006 KP_{17}	—	May 20, 2006	Palomar	NEAT	·	7.5 km	MPC · JPL
239160	2006 KY_{17}	—	May 21, 2006	Kitt Peak	Spacewatch	·	2.6 km	MPC · JPL
239161	2006 KJ_{20}	—	May 20, 2006	Anderson Mesa	LONEOS	·	3.5 km	MPC · JPL
239162	2006 KY_{29}	—	May 20, 2006	Kitt Peak	Spacewatch	·	3.2 km	MPC · JPL
239163	2006 KZ_{30}	—	May 20, 2006	Kitt Peak	Spacewatch	·	3.1 km	MPC · JPL
239164	2006 KC_{33}	—	May 20, 2006	Kitt Peak	Spacewatch	AGN	1.4 km	MPC · JPL
239165	2006 KG_{37}	—	May 22, 2006	Kitt Peak	Spacewatch	·	3.6 km	MPC · JPL
239166	2006 KF_{41}	—	May 19, 2006	Catalina	CSS	·	2.0 km	MPC · JPL
239167	2006 KE_{47}	—	May 21, 2006	Mount Lemmon	Mount Lemmon Survey	·	1.9 km	MPC · JPL
239168	2006 KK_{47}	—	May 21, 2006	Mount Lemmon	Mount Lemmon Survey	·	2.5 km	MPC · JPL
239169	2006 KT_{47}	—	May 21, 2006	Kitt Peak	Spacewatch	·	1.4 km	MPC · JPL
239170	2006 KE_{48}	—	May 21, 2006	Kitt Peak	Spacewatch	WIT	1.1 km	MPC · JPL
239171	2006 KE_{49}	—	May 21, 2006	Kitt Peak	Spacewatch	·	1.9 km	MPC · JPL
239172	2006 KF_{50}	—	May 21, 2006	Kitt Peak	Spacewatch	·	2.3 km	MPC · JPL
239173	2006 KF_{51}	—	May 21, 2006	Mount Lemmon	Mount Lemmon Survey	VER	4.7 km	MPC · JPL
239174	2006 KE_{60}	—	May 22, 2006	Kitt Peak	Spacewatch	·	1.9 km	MPC · JPL
239175	2006 KZ_{62}	—	May 22, 2006	Siding Spring	SSS	·	2.0 km	MPC · JPL
239176	2006 KQ_{66}	—	May 24, 2006	Kitt Peak	Spacewatch	WIT	1.3 km	MPC · JPL
239177	2006 KW_{71}	—	May 22, 2006	Kitt Peak	Spacewatch	·	2.1 km	MPC · JPL
239178	2006 KM_{74}	—	May 23, 2006	Kitt Peak	Spacewatch	·	4.0 km	MPC · JPL
239179	2006 KS_{77}	—	May 24, 2006	Palomar	NEAT	·	2.3 km	MPC · JPL
239180	2006 KW_{78}	—	May 24, 2006	Mount Lemmon	Mount Lemmon Survey	·	3.2 km	MPC · JPL
239181	2006 KY_{78}	—	May 24, 2006	Mount Lemmon	Mount Lemmon Survey	·	2.1 km	MPC · JPL
239182	2006 KU_{83}	—	May 21, 2006	Mount Lemmon	Mount Lemmon Survey	·	1.6 km	MPC · JPL
239183	2006 KW_{85}	—	May 21, 2006	Palomar	NEAT	·	1.4 km	MPC · JPL
239184	2006 KG_{92}	—	May 25, 2006	Kitt Peak	Spacewatch	MRX	1.2 km	MPC · JPL
239185	2006 KM_{93}	—	May 25, 2006	Kitt Peak	Spacewatch	·	1.3 km	MPC · JPL
239186	2006 KA_{100}	—	May 29, 2006	Siding Spring	SSS	·	1.5 km	MPC · JPL
239187	2006 KW_{100}	—	May 24, 2006	Palomar	NEAT	·	2.6 km	MPC · JPL
239188	2006 KA_{103}	—	May 29, 2006	Kitt Peak	Spacewatch	·	5.0 km	MPC · JPL
239189	2006 KR_{103}	—	May 30, 2006	Mount Nyukasa	Japan Aerospace Exploration Agency	VER	4.7 km	MPC · JPL
239190	2006 KQ_{104}	—	May 28, 2006	Kitt Peak	Spacewatch	EOS ·	5.4 km	MPC · JPL
239191	2006 KV_{104}	—	May 28, 2006	Kitt Peak	Spacewatch	(29841)	2.1 km	MPC · JPL
239192	2006 KT_{114}	—	May 27, 2006	Catalina	CSS	·	3.3 km	MPC · JPL
239193	2006 KB_{123}	—	May 28, 2006	Kitt Peak	Spacewatch	·	2.7 km	MPC · JPL
239194	2006 KU_{123}	—	May 26, 2006	Palomar	NEAT	·	1.9 km	MPC · JPL
239195	2006 LN	—	June 1, 2006	Reedy Creek	J. Broughton	·	5.8 km	MPC · JPL
239196	2006 LW_{2}	—	June 7, 2006	Siding Spring	SSS	EUN	2.3 km	MPC · JPL
239197	2006 MS_{1}	—	June 18, 2006	Palomar	NEAT	·	3.0 km	MPC · JPL
239198	2006 MP_{5}	—	June 17, 2006	Kitt Peak	Spacewatch	DOR	4.0 km	MPC · JPL
239199	2006 MJ_{11}	—	June 21, 2006	Palomar	NEAT	·	2.9 km	MPC · JPL
239200 Luoyang	2006 MD_{13}	Luoyang	June 23, 2006	Lulin	Q. Ye, Yang, T.-C.	AEO	1.7 km	MPC · JPL

== 239201–239300 ==
back to top

Designation			Discovery			Properties		Ref
Permanent	Provisional	Named after	Date	Site	Discoverer(s)	Category	Diam.	Ref
239201	2006 ML_{13}	—	June 23, 2006	Lulin	Q. Ye	KOR	1.6 km	MPC · JPL
239202	2006 OX	—	July 19, 2006	Bergisch Gladbach	W. Bickel	·	2.8 km	MPC · JPL
239203 Simeon	2006 OK_{14}	Simeon	July 27, 2006	Plana	Fratev, F.	·	3.0 km	MPC · JPL
239204	2006 ON_{16}	—	July 19, 2006	Lulin	LUSS	·	2.1 km	MPC · JPL
239205	2006 OT_{17}	—	July 18, 2006	Siding Spring	SSS	EOS	5.7 km	MPC · JPL
239206	2006 ON_{18}	—	July 20, 2006	Siding Spring	SSS	EUN	2.1 km	MPC · JPL
239207	2006 PQ_{18}	—	August 13, 2006	Palomar	NEAT	·	2.1 km	MPC · JPL
239208	2006 PN_{27}	—	August 13, 2006	Siding Spring	SSS	·	1.6 km	MPC · JPL
239209	2006 PR_{28}	—	August 14, 2006	Siding Spring	SSS	slow	2.0 km	MPC · JPL
239210	2006 PH_{38}	—	August 14, 2006	Palomar	NEAT	·	2.0 km	MPC · JPL
239211	2006 QY_{23}	—	August 22, 2006	Hibiscus	S. F. Hönig	TIN	2.4 km	MPC · JPL
239212	2006 QH_{34}	—	August 19, 2006	Kitt Peak	Spacewatch	·	2.1 km	MPC · JPL
239213	2006 QS_{55}	—	August 22, 2006	Palomar	NEAT	T_{j} (2.99) · 3:2 · SHU	7.0 km	MPC · JPL
239214	2006 QA_{56}	—	August 18, 2006	Kitt Peak	Spacewatch	·	2.3 km	MPC · JPL
239215	2006 QD_{98}	—	August 22, 2006	Palomar	NEAT	·	2.2 km	MPC · JPL
239216	2006 QK_{105}	—	August 28, 2006	Catalina	CSS	·	4.2 km	MPC · JPL
239217	2006 QH_{152}	—	August 19, 2006	Kitt Peak	Spacewatch	VER	4.8 km	MPC · JPL
239218	2006 QO_{169}	—	August 27, 2006	Anderson Mesa	LONEOS	EOS	2.6 km	MPC · JPL
239219	2006 RC_{14}	—	September 14, 2006	Kitt Peak	Spacewatch	·	4.3 km	MPC · JPL
239220	2006 RN_{56}	—	September 14, 2006	Kitt Peak	Spacewatch	·	3.9 km	MPC · JPL
239221	2006 RB_{78}	—	September 15, 2006	Kitt Peak	Spacewatch	·	3.6 km	MPC · JPL
239222	2006 RC_{99}	—	September 15, 2006	Kitt Peak	Spacewatch	VER	4.2 km	MPC · JPL
239223	2006 SR_{11}	—	September 16, 2006	Socorro	LINEAR	·	4.1 km	MPC · JPL
239224	2006 SY_{22}	—	September 17, 2006	Anderson Mesa	LONEOS	·	3.7 km	MPC · JPL
239225	2006 SD_{32}	—	September 17, 2006	Kitt Peak	Spacewatch	·	3.1 km	MPC · JPL
239226	2006 SY_{40}	—	September 18, 2006	Kitt Peak	Spacewatch	THM	3.0 km	MPC · JPL
239227	2006 SY_{54}	—	September 18, 2006	Catalina	CSS	·	6.3 km	MPC · JPL
239228	2006 SC_{56}	—	September 19, 2006	Socorro	LINEAR	DOR	4.2 km	MPC · JPL
239229	2006 SU_{60}	—	September 18, 2006	Catalina	CSS	·	4.0 km	MPC · JPL
239230	2006 SW_{90}	—	September 18, 2006	Kitt Peak	Spacewatch	·	5.8 km	MPC · JPL
239231	2006 SL_{111}	—	September 22, 2006	Socorro	LINEAR	·	3.0 km	MPC · JPL
239232	2006 SH_{119}	—	September 18, 2006	Catalina	CSS	HYG	4.8 km	MPC · JPL
239233	2006 SU_{129}	—	September 19, 2006	Anderson Mesa	LONEOS	HYG	3.3 km	MPC · JPL
239234	2006 SG_{141}	—	September 25, 2006	Anderson Mesa	LONEOS	·	6.4 km	MPC · JPL
239235	2006 SM_{164}	—	September 25, 2006	Kitt Peak	Spacewatch	NAE	4.7 km	MPC · JPL
239236	2006 SH_{206}	—	September 25, 2006	Kitt Peak	Spacewatch	·	4.3 km	MPC · JPL
239237	2006 SV_{224}	—	September 26, 2006	Kitt Peak	Spacewatch	HYG	3.9 km	MPC · JPL
239238	2006 SW_{246}	—	September 26, 2006	Mount Lemmon	Mount Lemmon Survey	·	2.2 km	MPC · JPL
239239	2006 SS_{295}	—	September 25, 2006	Kitt Peak	Spacewatch	·	5.4 km	MPC · JPL
239240	2006 ST_{323}	—	September 27, 2006	Kitt Peak	Spacewatch	·	3.2 km	MPC · JPL
239241	2006 SZ_{352}	—	September 30, 2006	Catalina	CSS	HYG	3.9 km	MPC · JPL
239242	2006 SZ_{380}	—	September 27, 2006	Apache Point	A. C. Becker	·	4.5 km	MPC · JPL
239243	2006 TJ_{12}	—	October 4, 2006	Mount Lemmon	Mount Lemmon Survey	·	3.6 km	MPC · JPL
239244	2006 TZ_{42}	—	October 12, 2006	Kitt Peak	Spacewatch	·	5.1 km	MPC · JPL
239245	2006 TB_{44}	—	October 12, 2006	Kitt Peak	Spacewatch	HYG	4.2 km	MPC · JPL
239246	2006 TA_{60}	—	October 13, 2006	Kitt Peak	Spacewatch	VER	4.8 km	MPC · JPL
239247	2006 TS_{75}	—	October 11, 2006	Palomar	NEAT	(1298)	5.8 km	MPC · JPL
239248	2006 TJ_{94}	—	October 15, 2006	Catalina	CSS	CYB	6.5 km	MPC · JPL
239249	2006 UA_{67}	—	October 16, 2006	Catalina	CSS	·	3.6 km	MPC · JPL
239250	2006 UH_{142}	—	October 19, 2006	Kitt Peak	Spacewatch	THB	4.5 km	MPC · JPL
239251	2006 UT_{143}	—	October 19, 2006	Kitt Peak	Spacewatch	·	4.8 km	MPC · JPL
239252	2006 UP_{199}	—	October 21, 2006	Catalina	CSS	·	5.4 km	MPC · JPL
239253	2006 UH_{269}	—	October 27, 2006	Mount Lemmon	Mount Lemmon Survey	·	3.2 km	MPC · JPL
239254 Gabbigriffith	2006 UL_{323}	Gabbigriffith	October 19, 2006	Kitt Peak	M. W. Buie	·	3.3 km	MPC · JPL
239255	2006 UA_{333}	—	October 21, 2006	Apache Point	A. C. Becker	·	4.1 km	MPC · JPL
239256	2006 VM_{29}	—	November 10, 2006	Kitt Peak	Spacewatch	·	5.3 km	MPC · JPL
239257	2006 YN_{1}	—	December 17, 2006	Mount Lemmon	Mount Lemmon Survey	·	6.2 km	MPC · JPL
239258	2007 DO_{39}	—	February 17, 2007	Kitt Peak	Spacewatch	·	2.0 km	MPC · JPL
239259	2007 DB_{53}	—	February 19, 2007	Mount Lemmon	Mount Lemmon Survey	·	950 m	MPC · JPL
239260	2007 DW_{60}	—	February 23, 2007	Catalina	CSS	H	700 m	MPC · JPL
239261	2007 EJ_{52}	—	March 11, 2007	Catalina	CSS	·	920 m	MPC · JPL
239262	2007 EH_{54}	—	March 11, 2007	Mount Lemmon	Mount Lemmon Survey	ERI	2.5 km	MPC · JPL
239263	2007 EH_{132}	—	March 9, 2007	Mount Lemmon	Mount Lemmon Survey	·	710 m	MPC · JPL
239264	2007 GH_{12}	—	April 11, 2007	Mount Lemmon	Mount Lemmon Survey	·	6.5 km	MPC · JPL
239265	2007 GB_{18}	—	April 11, 2007	Kitt Peak	Spacewatch	·	990 m	MPC · JPL
239266	2007 GN_{19}	—	April 11, 2007	Kitt Peak	Spacewatch	·	930 m	MPC · JPL
239267	2007 HT_{22}	—	April 18, 2007	Kitt Peak	Spacewatch	·	630 m	MPC · JPL
239268	2007 HY_{87}	—	April 26, 2007	Kitt Peak	Spacewatch	·	1.5 km	MPC · JPL
239269	2007 JW_{16}	—	May 7, 2007	Kitt Peak	Spacewatch	·	1.0 km	MPC · JPL
239270	2007 JC_{35}	—	May 11, 2007	Siding Spring	SSS	·	2.8 km	MPC · JPL
239271	2007 JV_{36}	—	May 9, 2007	Catalina	CSS	·	3.7 km	MPC · JPL
239272	2007 JC_{45}	—	May 11, 2007	Mount Lemmon	Mount Lemmon Survey	·	970 m	MPC · JPL
239273	2007 KS_{1}	—	May 17, 2007	Catalina	CSS	·	2.0 km	MPC · JPL
239274	2007 KW_{1}	—	May 18, 2007	Tiki	S. F. Hönig, Teamo, N.	·	930 m	MPC · JPL
239275	2007 KL_{7}	—	May 28, 2007	Tiki	S. F. Hönig, Teamo, N.	·	2.1 km	MPC · JPL
239276	2007 LP_{26}	—	June 14, 2007	Kitt Peak	Spacewatch	V	960 m	MPC · JPL
239277	2007 NV_{6}	—	July 15, 2007	Siding Spring	SSS	·	2.4 km	MPC · JPL
239278	2007 OP	—	July 17, 2007	Eskridge	G. Hug	EUN	1.5 km	MPC · JPL
239279	2007 OC_{1}	—	July 16, 2007	Socorro	LINEAR	·	1.6 km	MPC · JPL
239280	2007 OO_{5}	—	July 21, 2007	Lulin	LUSS	·	2.2 km	MPC · JPL
239281	2007 OL_{6}	—	July 20, 2007	Reedy Creek	J. Broughton	·	1.3 km	MPC · JPL
239282 Kevinmccarron	2007 OC_{8}	Kevinmccarron	July 24, 2007	Charleston	R. Holmes	·	2.1 km	MPC · JPL
239283	2007 PG	—	August 3, 2007	Eskridge	G. Hug	·	1.6 km	MPC · JPL
239284	2007 PK_{3}	—	August 6, 2007	Lulin	LUSS	·	1.4 km	MPC · JPL
239285	2007 PK_{5}	—	August 6, 2007	Socorro	LINEAR	·	2.7 km	MPC · JPL
239286	2007 PF_{11}	—	August 13, 2007	Pla D'Arguines	R. Ferrando	·	1.8 km	MPC · JPL
239287	2007 PQ_{11}	—	August 11, 2007	Socorro	LINEAR	V	1.1 km	MPC · JPL
239288	2007 PW_{11}	—	August 8, 2007	Socorro	LINEAR	·	1.2 km	MPC · JPL
239289	2007 PZ_{11}	—	August 11, 2007	Socorro	LINEAR	·	1.7 km	MPC · JPL
239290	2007 PX_{12}	—	August 8, 2007	Socorro	LINEAR	·	2.7 km	MPC · JPL
239291	2007 PF_{13}	—	August 8, 2007	Socorro	LINEAR	·	1.4 km	MPC · JPL
239292	2007 PS_{15}	—	August 8, 2007	Socorro	LINEAR	NYS	1.7 km	MPC · JPL
239293	2007 PX_{16}	—	August 8, 2007	Socorro	LINEAR	NYS	2.0 km	MPC · JPL
239294	2007 PM_{22}	—	August 10, 2007	Siding Spring	SSS	·	3.0 km	MPC · JPL
239295	2007 PS_{22}	—	August 11, 2007	Socorro	LINEAR	NYS	1.9 km	MPC · JPL
239296	2007 PH_{26}	—	August 11, 2007	Anderson Mesa	LONEOS	·	1.6 km	MPC · JPL
239297	2007 PA_{30}	—	August 9, 2007	Socorro	LINEAR	MAS	1.1 km	MPC · JPL
239298	2007 PC_{34}	—	August 12, 2007	Socorro	LINEAR	NYS	1.5 km	MPC · JPL
239299	2007 PP_{34}	—	August 9, 2007	Socorro	LINEAR	·	1.8 km	MPC · JPL
239300	2007 PQ_{37}	—	August 13, 2007	Socorro	LINEAR	·	1.5 km	MPC · JPL

== 239301–239400 ==
back to top

Designation			Discovery			Properties		Ref
Permanent	Provisional	Named after	Date	Site	Discoverer(s)	Category	Diam.	Ref
239301	2007 PO_{39}	—	August 11, 2007	Anderson Mesa	LONEOS	·	1.3 km	MPC · JPL
239302	2007 PO_{40}	—	August 15, 2007	La Sagra	OAM	·	4.2 km	MPC · JPL
239303	2007 PB_{43}	—	August 9, 2007	Socorro	LINEAR	slow	3.5 km	MPC · JPL
239304	2007 PB_{48}	—	August 11, 2007	Socorro	LINEAR	V	930 m	MPC · JPL
239305	2007 PQ_{48}	—	August 8, 2007	Siding Spring	SSS	·	2.6 km	MPC · JPL
239306	2007 QH_{2}	—	August 18, 2007	Bergisch Gladbach	W. Bickel	·	2.1 km	MPC · JPL
239307 Kruchynenko	2007 QS_{3}	Kruchynenko	August 24, 2007	Andrushivka	Andrushivka	PHO	1.5 km	MPC · JPL
239308	2007 QU_{5}	—	August 20, 2007	Purple Mountain	PMO NEO Survey Program	NYS	1.8 km	MPC · JPL
239309	2007 QW_{7}	—	August 21, 2007	Anderson Mesa	LONEOS	·	2.5 km	MPC · JPL
239310	2007 QO_{8}	—	August 21, 2007	Anderson Mesa	LONEOS	·	1.8 km	MPC · JPL
239311	2007 QZ_{9}	—	August 22, 2007	Socorro	LINEAR	·	990 m	MPC · JPL
239312	2007 QY_{15}	—	August 21, 2007	Anderson Mesa	LONEOS	·	1.9 km	MPC · JPL
239313	2007 RM_{16}	—	September 13, 2007	Wrightwood	J. W. Young	·	2.7 km	MPC · JPL
239314	2007 RN_{21}	—	September 3, 2007	Catalina	CSS	EOS	2.7 km	MPC · JPL
239315	2007 RD_{23}	—	September 3, 2007	Catalina	CSS	·	2.5 km	MPC · JPL
239316	2007 RQ_{24}	—	September 4, 2007	Catalina	CSS	·	5.2 km	MPC · JPL
239317	2007 RG_{34}	—	September 5, 2007	Anderson Mesa	LONEOS	·	2.3 km	MPC · JPL
239318	2007 RV_{34}	—	September 6, 2007	Anderson Mesa	LONEOS	·	3.1 km	MPC · JPL
239319	2007 RP_{36}	—	September 8, 2007	Anderson Mesa	LONEOS	·	1.6 km	MPC · JPL
239320	2007 RM_{37}	—	September 8, 2007	Anderson Mesa	LONEOS	·	4.0 km	MPC · JPL
239321	2007 RK_{38}	—	September 8, 2007	Anderson Mesa	LONEOS	MAS	920 m	MPC · JPL
239322	2007 RG_{40}	—	September 9, 2007	Kitt Peak	Spacewatch	·	3.3 km	MPC · JPL
239323	2007 RE_{41}	—	September 9, 2007	Anderson Mesa	LONEOS	MAS	970 m	MPC · JPL
239324	2007 RK_{41}	—	September 9, 2007	Anderson Mesa	LONEOS	·	3.9 km	MPC · JPL
239325	2007 RM_{41}	—	September 9, 2007	Anderson Mesa	LONEOS	·	1.9 km	MPC · JPL
239326	2007 RR_{41}	—	September 9, 2007	Anderson Mesa	LONEOS	·	2.4 km	MPC · JPL
239327	2007 RV_{47}	—	September 9, 2007	Mount Lemmon	Mount Lemmon Survey	NYS	1.6 km	MPC · JPL
239328	2007 RZ_{49}	—	September 9, 2007	Mount Lemmon	Mount Lemmon Survey	PHO	1.5 km	MPC · JPL
239329	2007 RN_{50}	—	September 9, 2007	Kitt Peak	Spacewatch	EOS	2.2 km	MPC · JPL
239330	2007 RY_{69}	—	September 10, 2007	Kitt Peak	Spacewatch	DOR	4.5 km	MPC · JPL
239331	2007 RZ_{69}	—	September 10, 2007	Kitt Peak	Spacewatch	·	2.1 km	MPC · JPL
239332	2007 RE_{75}	—	September 10, 2007	Mount Lemmon	Mount Lemmon Survey	·	3.0 km	MPC · JPL
239333	2007 RT_{77}	—	September 10, 2007	Mount Lemmon	Mount Lemmon Survey	·	2.9 km	MPC · JPL
239334	2007 RQ_{80}	—	September 10, 2007	Mount Lemmon	Mount Lemmon Survey	EUN	1.3 km	MPC · JPL
239335	2007 RJ_{95}	—	September 10, 2007	Mount Lemmon	Mount Lemmon Survey	·	1.3 km	MPC · JPL
239336	2007 RU_{97}	—	September 10, 2007	Kitt Peak	Spacewatch	·	4.0 km	MPC · JPL
239337	2007 RT_{98}	—	September 10, 2007	Kitt Peak	Spacewatch	·	4.0 km	MPC · JPL
239338	2007 RQ_{101}	—	September 11, 2007	Mount Lemmon	Mount Lemmon Survey	·	2.2 km	MPC · JPL
239339	2007 RG_{103}	—	September 11, 2007	Catalina	CSS	·	3.1 km	MPC · JPL
239340	2007 RD_{104}	—	September 11, 2007	Mount Lemmon	Mount Lemmon Survey	·	1.9 km	MPC · JPL
239341	2007 RM_{107}	—	September 11, 2007	Mount Lemmon	Mount Lemmon Survey	T_{j} (2.97) · 3:2	6.0 km	MPC · JPL
239342	2007 RQ_{109}	—	September 11, 2007	Kitt Peak	Spacewatch	KOR	1.4 km	MPC · JPL
239343	2007 RB_{113}	—	September 11, 2007	Kitt Peak	Spacewatch	·	2.4 km	MPC · JPL
239344	2007 RS_{114}	—	September 11, 2007	Kitt Peak	Spacewatch	·	2.8 km	MPC · JPL
239345	2007 RX_{125}	—	September 12, 2007	Mount Lemmon	Mount Lemmon Survey	KOR	1.7 km	MPC · JPL
239346	2007 RY_{139}	—	September 13, 2007	Socorro	LINEAR	·	1.5 km	MPC · JPL
239347	2007 RJ_{143}	—	September 14, 2007	Socorro	LINEAR	·	900 m	MPC · JPL
239348	2007 RE_{147}	—	September 11, 2007	Purple Mountain	PMO NEO Survey Program	NYS	1.8 km	MPC · JPL
239349	2007 RM_{149}	—	September 12, 2007	Catalina	CSS	·	4.5 km	MPC · JPL
239350	2007 RN_{157}	—	September 11, 2007	Purple Mountain	PMO NEO Survey Program	·	2.0 km	MPC · JPL
239351	2007 RL_{161}	—	September 13, 2007	Anderson Mesa	LONEOS	·	2.6 km	MPC · JPL
239352	2007 RF_{165}	—	September 10, 2007	Kitt Peak	Spacewatch	·	2.0 km	MPC · JPL
239353	2007 RG_{165}	—	September 10, 2007	Kitt Peak	Spacewatch	·	2.7 km	MPC · JPL
239354	2007 RD_{170}	—	September 10, 2007	Kitt Peak	Spacewatch	·	1.7 km	MPC · JPL
239355	2007 RD_{174}	—	September 10, 2007	Kitt Peak	Spacewatch	·	2.3 km	MPC · JPL
239356	2007 RH_{179}	—	September 10, 2007	Mount Lemmon	Mount Lemmon Survey	·	4.8 km	MPC · JPL
239357	2007 RK_{179}	—	September 10, 2007	Mount Lemmon	Mount Lemmon Survey	·	5.0 km	MPC · JPL
239358	2007 RQ_{179}	—	September 10, 2007	Mount Lemmon	Mount Lemmon Survey	·	2.9 km	MPC · JPL
239359	2007 RU_{181}	—	September 11, 2007	Mount Lemmon	Mount Lemmon Survey	·	2.6 km	MPC · JPL
239360	2007 RP_{185}	—	September 13, 2007	Mount Lemmon	Mount Lemmon Survey	·	5.2 km	MPC · JPL
239361	2007 RE_{204}	—	September 9, 2007	Kitt Peak	Spacewatch	·	7.2 km	MPC · JPL
239362	2007 RO_{214}	—	September 12, 2007	Kitt Peak	Spacewatch	·	3.2 km	MPC · JPL
239363	2007 RR_{214}	—	September 12, 2007	Kitt Peak	Spacewatch	(5)	1.4 km	MPC · JPL
239364	2007 RH_{219}	—	September 14, 2007	Mount Lemmon	Mount Lemmon Survey	·	1.4 km	MPC · JPL
239365	2007 RZ_{220}	—	September 14, 2007	Mount Lemmon	Mount Lemmon Survey	EOS	2.8 km	MPC · JPL
239366	2007 RG_{222}	—	September 14, 2007	Mount Lemmon	Mount Lemmon Survey	·	4.5 km	MPC · JPL
239367	2007 RW_{228}	—	September 11, 2007	Kitt Peak	Spacewatch	V	890 m	MPC · JPL
239368	2007 RR_{230}	—	September 11, 2007	Kitt Peak	Spacewatch	·	3.2 km	MPC · JPL
239369	2007 RD_{245}	—	September 11, 2007	Kitt Peak	Spacewatch	HOF	3.6 km	MPC · JPL
239370	2007 RH_{259}	—	September 14, 2007	Mount Lemmon	Mount Lemmon Survey	EOS	2.5 km	MPC · JPL
239371	2007 RG_{279}	—	September 6, 2007	Siding Spring	SSS	EUN	1.9 km	MPC · JPL
239372	2007 RA_{284}	—	September 9, 2007	Mount Lemmon	Mount Lemmon Survey	·	1.3 km	MPC · JPL
239373	2007 RF_{285}	—	September 13, 2007	Mount Lemmon	Mount Lemmon Survey	·	2.7 km	MPC · JPL
239374	2007 RR_{285}	—	September 14, 2007	Mount Lemmon	Mount Lemmon Survey	·	2.7 km	MPC · JPL
239375	2007 RA_{286}	—	September 15, 2007	Kitt Peak	Spacewatch	·	1.3 km	MPC · JPL
239376	2007 RW_{289}	—	September 14, 2007	Mount Lemmon	Mount Lemmon Survey	·	4.0 km	MPC · JPL
239377	2007 RV_{308}	—	September 3, 2007	Catalina	CSS	HYG	4.0 km	MPC · JPL
239378	2007 RC_{313}	—	September 4, 2007	Catalina	CSS	MAS	980 m	MPC · JPL
239379	2007 RQ_{319}	—	September 12, 2007	Mount Lemmon	Mount Lemmon Survey	·	2.4 km	MPC · JPL
239380	2007 SQ	—	September 18, 2007	Mayhill	Lowe, A.	·	3.3 km	MPC · JPL
239381	2007 SM_{1}	—	September 18, 2007	Goodricke-Pigott	R. A. Tucker	·	2.3 km	MPC · JPL
239382	2007 SM_{6}	—	September 22, 2007	Altschwendt	W. Ries	·	4.3 km	MPC · JPL
239383	2007 SC_{11}	—	September 22, 2007	Črni Vrh	Matičič, S.	·	3.5 km	MPC · JPL
239384	2007 SZ_{11}	—	September 22, 2007	Črni Vrh	Matičič, S.	·	2.9 km	MPC · JPL
239385	2007 SK_{13}	—	September 19, 2007	Kitt Peak	Spacewatch	EOS	2.5 km	MPC · JPL
239386	2007 SE_{14}	—	September 20, 2007	Catalina	CSS	BRA	2.2 km	MPC · JPL
239387	2007 SG_{14}	—	September 20, 2007	Catalina	CSS	·	2.3 km	MPC · JPL
239388	2007 SJ_{19}	—	September 25, 2007	Mount Lemmon	Mount Lemmon Survey	·	4.2 km	MPC · JPL
239389	2007 TE_{9}	—	October 6, 2007	Socorro	LINEAR	·	2.3 km	MPC · JPL
239390	2007 TA_{15}	—	October 8, 2007	Catalina	CSS	·	1.4 km	MPC · JPL
239391	2007 TF_{18}	—	October 4, 2007	Kitt Peak	Spacewatch	·	3.9 km	MPC · JPL
239392	2007 TG_{20}	—	October 7, 2007	Socorro	LINEAR	·	3.0 km	MPC · JPL
239393	2007 TZ_{21}	—	October 8, 2007	Anderson Mesa	LONEOS	·	4.2 km	MPC · JPL
239394	2007 TE_{22}	—	October 8, 2007	Goodricke-Pigott	R. A. Tucker	·	3.8 km	MPC · JPL
239395	2007 TJ_{23}	—	October 9, 2007	Dauban	Chante-Perdrix	·	1.6 km	MPC · JPL
239396	2007 TH_{25}	—	October 4, 2007	Kitt Peak	Spacewatch	·	2.3 km	MPC · JPL
239397	2007 TF_{29}	—	October 4, 2007	Kitt Peak	Spacewatch	VER	3.4 km	MPC · JPL
239398	2007 TV_{36}	—	October 4, 2007	Kitt Peak	Spacewatch	(17392)	1.9 km	MPC · JPL
239399	2007 TJ_{38}	—	October 4, 2007	Catalina	CSS	EOS	2.5 km	MPC · JPL
239400	2007 TL_{40}	—	October 6, 2007	Kitt Peak	Spacewatch	·	1.2 km	MPC · JPL

== 239401–239500 ==
back to top

Designation			Discovery			Properties		Ref
Permanent	Provisional	Named after	Date	Site	Discoverer(s)	Category	Diam.	Ref
239401	2007 TP_{41}	—	October 6, 2007	Kitt Peak	Spacewatch	·	3.0 km	MPC · JPL
239402	2007 TU_{41}	—	October 6, 2007	Purple Mountain	PMO NEO Survey Program	·	1.9 km	MPC · JPL
239403	2007 TX_{41}	—	October 7, 2007	Mount Lemmon	Mount Lemmon Survey	·	2.3 km	MPC · JPL
239404	2007 TX_{44}	—	October 7, 2007	Catalina	CSS	·	3.0 km	MPC · JPL
239405	2007 TF_{48}	—	October 4, 2007	Kitt Peak	Spacewatch	·	3.6 km	MPC · JPL
239406	2007 TX_{48}	—	October 4, 2007	Kitt Peak	Spacewatch	·	2.7 km	MPC · JPL
239407	2007 TD_{49}	—	October 4, 2007	Kitt Peak	Spacewatch	·	1.7 km	MPC · JPL
239408	2007 TF_{50}	—	October 4, 2007	Kitt Peak	Spacewatch	·	4.1 km	MPC · JPL
239409	2007 TL_{55}	—	October 4, 2007	Kitt Peak	Spacewatch	·	4.3 km	MPC · JPL
239410	2007 TX_{56}	—	October 4, 2007	Kitt Peak	Spacewatch	·	4.8 km	MPC · JPL
239411	2007 TZ_{58}	—	October 5, 2007	Kitt Peak	Spacewatch	·	2.1 km	MPC · JPL
239412	2007 TY_{62}	—	October 7, 2007	Mount Lemmon	Mount Lemmon Survey	·	5.7 km	MPC · JPL
239413	2007 TD_{68}	—	October 10, 2007	Catalina	CSS	·	7.2 km	MPC · JPL
239414	2007 TG_{74}	—	October 9, 2007	Anderson Mesa	LONEOS	MAR	1.9 km	MPC · JPL
239415	2007 TK_{74}	—	October 11, 2007	Goodricke-Pigott	R. A. Tucker	·	1.7 km	MPC · JPL
239416	2007 TY_{91}	—	October 4, 2007	Catalina	CSS	·	1.9 km	MPC · JPL
239417	2007 TR_{92}	—	October 5, 2007	Purple Mountain	PMO NEO Survey Program	·	4.1 km	MPC · JPL
239418	2007 TY_{93}	—	October 6, 2007	Kitt Peak	Spacewatch	KOR	1.7 km	MPC · JPL
239419	2007 TA_{95}	—	October 7, 2007	Catalina	CSS	·	1.7 km	MPC · JPL
239420	2007 TW_{106}	—	October 4, 2007	Kitt Peak	Spacewatch	·	3.6 km	MPC · JPL
239421	2007 TA_{112}	—	October 8, 2007	Catalina	CSS	·	3.3 km	MPC · JPL
239422	2007 TF_{124}	—	October 6, 2007	Kitt Peak	Spacewatch	·	1.7 km	MPC · JPL
239423	2007 TJ_{124}	—	October 6, 2007	Kitt Peak	Spacewatch	KOR	1.7 km	MPC · JPL
239424	2007 TJ_{138}	—	October 8, 2007	Mount Lemmon	Mount Lemmon Survey	·	1.5 km	MPC · JPL
239425	2007 TG_{140}	—	October 9, 2007	Mount Lemmon	Mount Lemmon Survey	·	3.4 km	MPC · JPL
239426	2007 TU_{141}	—	October 9, 2007	Mount Lemmon	Mount Lemmon Survey	·	3.7 km	MPC · JPL
239427	2007 TM_{146}	—	October 6, 2007	Socorro	LINEAR	·	4.4 km	MPC · JPL
239428	2007 TR_{147}	—	October 7, 2007	Socorro	LINEAR	·	1.8 km	MPC · JPL
239429	2007 TK_{148}	—	October 7, 2007	Socorro	LINEAR	·	4.7 km	MPC · JPL
239430	2007 TP_{153}	—	October 9, 2007	Socorro	LINEAR	·	3.7 km	MPC · JPL
239431	2007 TV_{154}	—	October 9, 2007	Socorro	LINEAR	·	3.0 km	MPC · JPL
239432	2007 TY_{154}	—	October 9, 2007	Socorro	LINEAR	·	5.7 km	MPC · JPL
239433	2007 TQ_{161}	—	October 11, 2007	Socorro	LINEAR	·	2.9 km	MPC · JPL
239434	2007 TX_{161}	—	October 11, 2007	Socorro	LINEAR	·	5.0 km	MPC · JPL
239435	2007 TB_{163}	—	October 11, 2007	Socorro	LINEAR	·	3.5 km	MPC · JPL
239436	2007 TH_{163}	—	October 11, 2007	Socorro	LINEAR	·	4.1 km	MPC · JPL
239437	2007 TT_{163}	—	October 11, 2007	Socorro	LINEAR	·	3.3 km	MPC · JPL
239438	2007 TU_{164}	—	October 11, 2007	Socorro	LINEAR	·	5.3 km	MPC · JPL
239439	2007 TQ_{168}	—	October 12, 2007	Socorro	LINEAR	·	2.5 km	MPC · JPL
239440	2007 TR_{171}	—	October 13, 2007	Socorro	LINEAR	·	2.9 km	MPC · JPL
239441	2007 TO_{175}	—	October 4, 2007	Kitt Peak	Spacewatch	KOR	1.7 km	MPC · JPL
239442	2007 TJ_{177}	—	October 6, 2007	Kitt Peak	Spacewatch	EOS	2.7 km	MPC · JPL
239443	2007 TY_{177}	—	October 6, 2007	Kitt Peak	Spacewatch	·	4.9 km	MPC · JPL
239444	2007 TQ_{178}	—	October 7, 2007	Mount Lemmon	Mount Lemmon Survey	·	2.8 km	MPC · JPL
239445	2007 TO_{180}	—	October 8, 2007	Mount Lemmon	Mount Lemmon Survey	·	3.9 km	MPC · JPL
239446	2007 TA_{186}	—	October 13, 2007	Socorro	LINEAR	·	2.4 km	MPC · JPL
239447	2007 TX_{186}	—	October 13, 2007	Socorro	LINEAR	·	3.5 km	MPC · JPL
239448	2007 TD_{190}	—	October 4, 2007	Mount Lemmon	Mount Lemmon Survey	·	2.1 km	MPC · JPL
239449	2007 TW_{207}	—	October 10, 2007	Catalina	CSS	·	4.3 km	MPC · JPL
239450	2007 TR_{215}	—	October 7, 2007	Kitt Peak	Spacewatch	MRX	1.4 km	MPC · JPL
239451	2007 TQ_{217}	—	October 7, 2007	Kitt Peak	Spacewatch	·	2.4 km	MPC · JPL
239452	2007 TC_{226}	—	October 8, 2007	Kitt Peak	Spacewatch	·	1.3 km	MPC · JPL
239453	2007 TY_{229}	—	October 8, 2007	Kitt Peak	Spacewatch	·	1.8 km	MPC · JPL
239454	2007 TY_{234}	—	October 9, 2007	Kitt Peak	Spacewatch	KOR	1.7 km	MPC · JPL
239455	2007 TS_{237}	—	October 9, 2007	Mount Lemmon	Mount Lemmon Survey	EOS	2.5 km	MPC · JPL
239456	2007 TB_{242}	—	October 8, 2007	Catalina	CSS	·	3.3 km	MPC · JPL
239457	2007 TG_{256}	—	October 10, 2007	Kitt Peak	Spacewatch	·	4.0 km	MPC · JPL
239458	2007 TC_{269}	—	October 9, 2007	Kitt Peak	Spacewatch	·	4.1 km	MPC · JPL
239459	2007 TO_{278}	—	October 11, 2007	Mount Lemmon	Mount Lemmon Survey	·	3.1 km	MPC · JPL
239460	2007 TH_{281}	—	October 7, 2007	Mount Lemmon	Mount Lemmon Survey	·	2.6 km	MPC · JPL
239461	2007 TQ_{281}	—	October 7, 2007	Mount Lemmon	Mount Lemmon Survey	·	2.3 km	MPC · JPL
239462	2007 TK_{289}	—	October 11, 2007	Lulin	LUSS	·	3.0 km	MPC · JPL
239463	2007 TX_{316}	—	October 12, 2007	Kitt Peak	Spacewatch	GEF	2.6 km	MPC · JPL
239464	2007 TT_{347}	—	October 14, 2007	Mount Lemmon	Mount Lemmon Survey	AGN	1.5 km	MPC · JPL
239465	2007 TZ_{373}	—	October 14, 2007	Catalina	CSS	·	3.1 km	MPC · JPL
239466	2007 TJ_{375}	—	October 15, 2007	Mount Lemmon	Mount Lemmon Survey	·	2.8 km	MPC · JPL
239467	2007 TO_{375}	—	October 15, 2007	Catalina	CSS	NYS	1.5 km	MPC · JPL
239468	2007 TR_{388}	—	October 13, 2007	Catalina	CSS	KOR	2.2 km	MPC · JPL
239469	2007 TG_{428}	—	October 10, 2007	Mount Lemmon	Mount Lemmon Survey	·	3.8 km	MPC · JPL
239470	2007 TS_{443}	—	October 10, 2007	Lulin	LUSS	·	4.8 km	MPC · JPL
239471	2007 UZ_{8}	—	October 16, 2007	Catalina	CSS	EMA	3.8 km	MPC · JPL
239472	2007 UF_{12}	—	October 18, 2007	Mount Lemmon	Mount Lemmon Survey	·	1.8 km	MPC · JPL
239473	2007 UT_{14}	—	October 17, 2007	Catalina	CSS	·	6.1 km	MPC · JPL
239474	2007 UF_{17}	—	October 18, 2007	Mount Lemmon	Mount Lemmon Survey	KOR	1.8 km	MPC · JPL
239475	2007 UX_{20}	—	October 16, 2007	Kitt Peak	Spacewatch	·	2.9 km	MPC · JPL
239476	2007 UF_{21}	—	October 16, 2007	Kitt Peak	Spacewatch	·	2.3 km	MPC · JPL
239477	2007 UB_{26}	—	October 16, 2007	Kitt Peak	Spacewatch	·	3.6 km	MPC · JPL
239478	2007 UJ_{29}	—	October 18, 2007	Mount Lemmon	Mount Lemmon Survey	·	2.4 km	MPC · JPL
239479	2007 UX_{35}	—	October 19, 2007	Catalina	CSS	·	1.6 km	MPC · JPL
239480	2007 UW_{37}	—	October 19, 2007	Catalina	CSS	·	2.6 km	MPC · JPL
239481	2007 UX_{40}	—	October 16, 2007	Kitt Peak	Spacewatch	(13314)	2.4 km	MPC · JPL
239482	2007 UM_{59}	—	October 30, 2007	Mount Lemmon	Mount Lemmon Survey	·	3.4 km	MPC · JPL
239483	2007 UF_{80}	—	October 31, 2007	Mount Lemmon	Mount Lemmon Survey	KOR	1.4 km	MPC · JPL
239484	2007 UC_{84}	—	October 30, 2007	Kitt Peak	Spacewatch	·	3.5 km	MPC · JPL
239485	2007 UQ_{86}	—	October 30, 2007	Kitt Peak	Spacewatch	KOR	1.8 km	MPC · JPL
239486	2007 UT_{95}	—	October 30, 2007	Mount Lemmon	Mount Lemmon Survey	KOR	1.5 km	MPC · JPL
239487	2007 UD_{105}	—	October 30, 2007	Kitt Peak	Spacewatch	·	5.3 km	MPC · JPL
239488	2007 UL_{107}	—	October 31, 2007	Catalina	CSS	·	4.1 km	MPC · JPL
239489	2007 UA_{113}	—	October 30, 2007	Kitt Peak	Spacewatch	·	1.7 km	MPC · JPL
239490	2007 UN_{118}	—	October 31, 2007	Kitt Peak	Spacewatch	·	2.2 km	MPC · JPL
239491	2007 UE_{128}	—	October 19, 2007	Catalina	CSS	·	3.6 km	MPC · JPL
239492	2007 UQ_{133}	—	October 31, 2007	Kitt Peak	Spacewatch	·	3.2 km	MPC · JPL
239493	2007 VO_{34}	—	November 3, 2007	7300	W. K. Y. Yeung	·	5.6 km	MPC · JPL
239494	2007 VN_{52}	—	November 1, 2007	Kitt Peak	Spacewatch	·	4.7 km	MPC · JPL
239495	2007 VU_{52}	—	November 1, 2007	Kitt Peak	Spacewatch	·	2.6 km	MPC · JPL
239496	2007 VV_{57}	—	November 1, 2007	Kitt Peak	Spacewatch	·	4.1 km	MPC · JPL
239497	2007 VR_{73}	—	November 2, 2007	Kitt Peak	Spacewatch	·	2.3 km	MPC · JPL
239498	2007 VF_{84}	—	November 2, 2007	Catalina	CSS	·	6.3 km	MPC · JPL
239499	2007 VP_{97}	—	November 1, 2007	Kitt Peak	Spacewatch	·	2.4 km	MPC · JPL
239500	2007 VF_{122}	—	November 5, 2007	Kitt Peak	Spacewatch	·	5.3 km	MPC · JPL

== 239501–239600 ==
back to top

Designation			Discovery			Properties		Ref
Permanent	Provisional	Named after	Date	Site	Discoverer(s)	Category	Diam.	Ref
239501	2007 VF_{127}	—	November 1, 2007	Mount Lemmon	Mount Lemmon Survey	·	2.9 km	MPC · JPL
239502	2007 VP_{164}	—	November 5, 2007	Kitt Peak	Spacewatch	·	5.5 km	MPC · JPL
239503	2007 VH_{165}	—	November 5, 2007	Kitt Peak	Spacewatch	SYL · CYB	5.8 km	MPC · JPL
239504	2007 VJ_{171}	—	November 7, 2007	Kitt Peak	Spacewatch	·	3.3 km	MPC · JPL
239505	2007 VR_{189}	—	November 12, 2007	Magdalena Ridge	Ryan, W. H.	EOS	3.4 km	MPC · JPL
239506	2007 VD_{204}	—	November 9, 2007	Kitt Peak	Spacewatch	·	2.4 km	MPC · JPL
239507	2007 VL_{214}	—	November 9, 2007	Kitt Peak	Spacewatch	·	4.5 km	MPC · JPL
239508	2007 VG_{215}	—	November 9, 2007	Kitt Peak	Spacewatch	·	2.3 km	MPC · JPL
239509	2007 VP_{232}	—	November 7, 2007	Kitt Peak	Spacewatch	EOS	3.3 km	MPC · JPL
239510	2007 VY_{232}	—	November 7, 2007	Kitt Peak	Spacewatch	(13314)	3.3 km	MPC · JPL
239511	2007 VF_{269}	—	November 14, 2007	Socorro	LINEAR	·	4.2 km	MPC · JPL
239512	2007 VM_{275}	—	November 13, 2007	Kitt Peak	Spacewatch	·	3.0 km	MPC · JPL
239513	2007 VY_{286}	—	November 15, 2007	Anderson Mesa	LONEOS	·	3.3 km	MPC · JPL
239514	2007 VN_{298}	—	November 11, 2007	Catalina	CSS	·	6.0 km	MPC · JPL
239515	2007 WH_{23}	—	November 18, 2007	Mount Lemmon	Mount Lemmon Survey	·	3.9 km	MPC · JPL
239516	2007 WX_{60}	—	November 17, 2007	Kitt Peak	Spacewatch	DOR	4.8 km	MPC · JPL
239517	2007 XD_{23}	—	December 13, 2007	Dauban	Chante-Perdrix	·	3.3 km	MPC · JPL
239518	2008 AL_{8}	—	January 10, 2008	Kitt Peak	Spacewatch	BRA	3.5 km	MPC · JPL
239519	2008 DJ_{54}	—	February 27, 2008	Catalina	CSS	·	6.5 km	MPC · JPL
239520	2008 GD_{90}	—	April 6, 2008	Mount Lemmon	Mount Lemmon Survey	·	750 m	MPC · JPL
239521	2008 HX_{3}	—	April 26, 2008	Dauban	Kugel, F.	L5	15 km	MPC · JPL
239522	2008 OG_{24}	—	July 30, 2008	Mount Lemmon	Mount Lemmon Survey	·	2.5 km	MPC · JPL
239523	2008 PG	—	August 1, 2008	Socorro	LINEAR	H	750 m	MPC · JPL
239524	2008 QA_{31}	—	August 30, 2008	Socorro	LINEAR	·	3.2 km	MPC · JPL
239525	2008 RW_{8}	—	September 3, 2008	Kitt Peak	Spacewatch	·	4.9 km	MPC · JPL
239526	2008 RE_{22}	—	September 3, 2008	La Sagra	OAM	·	1.2 km	MPC · JPL
239527	2008 RC_{32}	—	September 2, 2008	Kitt Peak	Spacewatch	NYS	930 m	MPC · JPL
239528	2008 RX_{35}	—	September 2, 2008	Kitt Peak	Spacewatch	MAS	840 m	MPC · JPL
239529	2008 RO_{57}	—	September 3, 2008	Kitt Peak	Spacewatch	·	1.2 km	MPC · JPL
239530	2008 RL_{94}	—	September 6, 2008	Kitt Peak	Spacewatch	·	1.8 km	MPC · JPL
239531	2008 RK_{96}	—	September 7, 2008	Mount Lemmon	Mount Lemmon Survey	3:2	4.4 km	MPC · JPL
239532	2008 RT_{97}	—	September 7, 2008	Mount Lemmon	Mount Lemmon Survey	·	830 m	MPC · JPL
239533	2008 SS_{5}	—	September 22, 2008	Socorro	LINEAR	·	1.0 km	MPC · JPL
239534	2008 SO_{12}	—	September 21, 2008	Kitt Peak	Spacewatch	·	1.0 km	MPC · JPL
239535	2008 SF_{26}	—	September 19, 2008	Kitt Peak	Spacewatch	·	850 m	MPC · JPL
239536	2008 ST_{29}	—	September 19, 2008	Kitt Peak	Spacewatch	·	1.3 km	MPC · JPL
239537	2008 SW_{31}	—	September 20, 2008	Kitt Peak	Spacewatch	·	1.1 km	MPC · JPL
239538	2008 SW_{38}	—	September 20, 2008	Kitt Peak	Spacewatch	·	2.7 km	MPC · JPL
239539	2008 SJ_{39}	—	September 20, 2008	Kitt Peak	Spacewatch	·	1.3 km	MPC · JPL
239540	2008 SG_{44}	—	September 20, 2008	Kitt Peak	Spacewatch	·	850 m	MPC · JPL
239541	2008 SW_{81}	—	September 25, 2008	Sierra Stars	Tozzi, F.	EUN	1.9 km	MPC · JPL
239542	2008 SS_{90}	—	September 21, 2008	Kitt Peak	Spacewatch	·	5.3 km	MPC · JPL
239543	2008 SZ_{92}	—	September 21, 2008	Kitt Peak	Spacewatch	·	4.4 km	MPC · JPL
239544	2008 SH_{93}	—	September 21, 2008	Kitt Peak	Spacewatch	·	3.5 km	MPC · JPL
239545	2008 SC_{98}	—	September 21, 2008	Kitt Peak	Spacewatch	·	3.6 km	MPC · JPL
239546	2008 SN_{98}	—	September 21, 2008	Kitt Peak	Spacewatch	·	1.2 km	MPC · JPL
239547	2008 SZ_{101}	—	September 21, 2008	Mount Lemmon	Mount Lemmon Survey	·	2.7 km	MPC · JPL
239548	2008 SL_{103}	—	September 21, 2008	Mount Lemmon	Mount Lemmon Survey	KON	3.1 km	MPC · JPL
239549	2008 SW_{105}	—	September 21, 2008	Kitt Peak	Spacewatch	·	5.0 km	MPC · JPL
239550	2008 SF_{115}	—	September 22, 2008	Kitt Peak	Spacewatch	·	990 m	MPC · JPL
239551	2008 SZ_{130}	—	September 22, 2008	Kitt Peak	Spacewatch	·	1.5 km	MPC · JPL
239552	2008 SH_{136}	—	September 23, 2008	Kitt Peak	Spacewatch	·	2.9 km	MPC · JPL
239553	2008 SL_{138}	—	September 23, 2008	Kitt Peak	Spacewatch	·	3.8 km	MPC · JPL
239554	2008 SG_{147}	—	September 24, 2008	Mount Lemmon	Mount Lemmon Survey	·	1.9 km	MPC · JPL
239555	2008 SD_{156}	—	September 23, 2008	Socorro	LINEAR	·	1.9 km	MPC · JPL
239556	2008 SO_{163}	—	September 28, 2008	Socorro	LINEAR	·	2.1 km	MPC · JPL
239557	2008 SX_{173}	—	September 22, 2008	Catalina	CSS	H	920 m	MPC · JPL
239558	2008 SQ_{176}	—	September 23, 2008	Mount Lemmon	Mount Lemmon Survey	NAE	4.7 km	MPC · JPL
239559	2008 SX_{176}	—	September 23, 2008	Mount Lemmon	Mount Lemmon Survey	·	2.5 km	MPC · JPL
239560	2008 SO_{189}	—	September 25, 2008	Kitt Peak	Spacewatch	·	2.3 km	MPC · JPL
239561	2008 SK_{196}	—	September 25, 2008	Kitt Peak	Spacewatch	·	1.6 km	MPC · JPL
239562	2008 SM_{204}	—	September 26, 2008	Kitt Peak	Spacewatch	·	1.4 km	MPC · JPL
239563	2008 SG_{279}	—	September 29, 2008	Kitt Peak	Spacewatch	·	870 m	MPC · JPL
239564	2008 SE_{285}	—	September 29, 2008	Catalina	CSS	·	2.7 km	MPC · JPL
239565	2008 SH_{296}	—	September 29, 2008	Catalina	CSS	·	770 m	MPC · JPL
239566	2008 SV_{299}	—	September 22, 2008	Kitt Peak	Spacewatch	·	3.4 km	MPC · JPL
239567	2008 SD_{302}	—	September 23, 2008	Kitt Peak	Spacewatch	HOF	4.5 km	MPC · JPL
239568	2008 TE_{5}	—	October 1, 2008	La Sagra	OAM	·	1.5 km	MPC · JPL
239569	2008 TU_{39}	—	October 1, 2008	Kitt Peak	Spacewatch	NEM	2.2 km	MPC · JPL
239570	2008 TC_{54}	—	October 2, 2008	Kitt Peak	Spacewatch	·	1.5 km	MPC · JPL
239571	2008 TV_{57}	—	October 2, 2008	Kitt Peak	Spacewatch	·	710 m	MPC · JPL
239572	2008 TR_{59}	—	October 2, 2008	Kitt Peak	Spacewatch	(6769)	1.3 km	MPC · JPL
239573	2008 TH_{74}	—	October 2, 2008	Kitt Peak	Spacewatch	(5)	1.5 km	MPC · JPL
239574	2008 TY_{86}	—	October 3, 2008	Kitt Peak	Spacewatch	NYS	1.2 km	MPC · JPL
239575	2008 TY_{89}	—	October 3, 2008	Kitt Peak	Spacewatch	·	1.7 km	MPC · JPL
239576	2008 TS_{93}	—	October 5, 2008	La Sagra	OAM	·	920 m	MPC · JPL
239577	2008 TD_{103}	—	October 6, 2008	Kitt Peak	Spacewatch	·	1.6 km	MPC · JPL
239578	2008 TO_{110}	—	October 6, 2008	Catalina	CSS	·	2.0 km	MPC · JPL
239579	2008 TF_{118}	—	October 6, 2008	Kitt Peak	Spacewatch	·	1.6 km	MPC · JPL
239580	2008 TP_{140}	—	October 9, 2008	Mount Lemmon	Mount Lemmon Survey	·	4.5 km	MPC · JPL
239581	2008 TT_{165}	—	October 5, 2008	La Sagra	OAM	·	4.9 km	MPC · JPL
239582	2008 TX_{169}	—	October 8, 2008	Mount Lemmon	Mount Lemmon Survey	·	2.8 km	MPC · JPL
239583	2008 TC_{172}	—	October 9, 2008	Mount Lemmon	Mount Lemmon Survey	·	1.9 km	MPC · JPL
239584	2008 TL_{185}	—	October 6, 2008	Mount Lemmon	Mount Lemmon Survey	·	2.1 km	MPC · JPL
239585	2008 UU_{7}	—	October 17, 2008	Kitt Peak	Spacewatch	MAS	740 m	MPC · JPL
239586	2008 UY_{9}	—	October 17, 2008	Kitt Peak	Spacewatch	NYS	1.5 km	MPC · JPL
239587	2008 UH_{18}	—	October 19, 2008	Kitt Peak	Spacewatch	·	1.7 km	MPC · JPL
239588	2008 UU_{30}	—	October 20, 2008	Kitt Peak	Spacewatch	·	730 m	MPC · JPL
239589	2008 UW_{32}	—	October 20, 2008	Kitt Peak	Spacewatch	·	790 m	MPC · JPL
239590	2008 UY_{33}	—	October 20, 2008	Mount Lemmon	Mount Lemmon Survey	·	1.4 km	MPC · JPL
239591	2008 UX_{37}	—	October 20, 2008	Kitt Peak	Spacewatch	·	780 m	MPC · JPL
239592	2008 UO_{54}	—	October 20, 2008	Mount Lemmon	Mount Lemmon Survey	·	2.2 km	MPC · JPL
239593 Tianwenbang	2008 UD_{55}	Tianwenbang	October 20, 2008	Lulin	Hsiao and Ye, H.-Y., Q. Ye	·	1.2 km	MPC · JPL
239594	2008 UL_{58}	—	October 21, 2008	Kitt Peak	Spacewatch	·	820 m	MPC · JPL
239595	2008 UN_{74}	—	October 21, 2008	Kitt Peak	Spacewatch	·	4.4 km	MPC · JPL
239596	2008 UZ_{75}	—	October 21, 2008	Kitt Peak	Spacewatch	·	1.7 km	MPC · JPL
239597	2008 UL_{98}	—	October 26, 2008	Socorro	LINEAR	V	1.2 km	MPC · JPL
239598	2008 UE_{114}	—	October 22, 2008	Kitt Peak	Spacewatch	·	2.2 km	MPC · JPL
239599	2008 UQ_{114}	—	October 22, 2008	Kitt Peak	Spacewatch	·	1.9 km	MPC · JPL
239600	2008 UO_{140}	—	October 23, 2008	Kitt Peak	Spacewatch	NYS	1.4 km	MPC · JPL

== 239601–239700 ==
back to top

Designation			Discovery			Properties		Ref
Permanent	Provisional	Named after	Date	Site	Discoverer(s)	Category	Diam.	Ref
239601	2008 UY_{141}	—	October 23, 2008	Kitt Peak	Spacewatch	·	1.5 km	MPC · JPL
239602	2008 UE_{148}	—	October 23, 2008	Kitt Peak	Spacewatch	·	1.3 km	MPC · JPL
239603	2008 UA_{149}	—	October 23, 2008	Kitt Peak	Spacewatch	V	960 m	MPC · JPL
239604	2008 UH_{154}	—	October 23, 2008	Kitt Peak	Spacewatch	·	910 m	MPC · JPL
239605	2008 UP_{156}	—	October 23, 2008	Mount Lemmon	Mount Lemmon Survey	·	1.7 km	MPC · JPL
239606	2008 UC_{167}	—	October 24, 2008	Kitt Peak	Spacewatch	·	2.9 km	MPC · JPL
239607	2008 US_{192}	—	October 25, 2008	Mount Lemmon	Mount Lemmon Survey	CLA	1.7 km	MPC · JPL
239608	2008 UL_{197}	—	October 27, 2008	Mount Lemmon	Mount Lemmon Survey	·	1.5 km	MPC · JPL
239609	2008 UU_{202}	—	October 27, 2008	Socorro	LINEAR	(5)	2.2 km	MPC · JPL
239610	2008 UY_{211}	—	October 23, 2008	Kitt Peak	Spacewatch	·	3.6 km	MPC · JPL
239611 Likwohting	2008 UC_{212}	Likwohting	October 23, 2008	Lulin	Hsiao, X. Y., Q. Ye	·	1.2 km	MPC · JPL
239612	2008 UU_{212}	—	October 24, 2008	Kitt Peak	Spacewatch	·	1.4 km	MPC · JPL
239613	2008 UW_{220}	—	October 25, 2008	Mount Lemmon	Mount Lemmon Survey	AGN	2.0 km	MPC · JPL
239614	2008 UB_{223}	—	October 25, 2008	Kitt Peak	Spacewatch	·	1.9 km	MPC · JPL
239615	2008 UR_{238}	—	October 26, 2008	Kitt Peak	Spacewatch	AGN	1.2 km	MPC · JPL
239616	2008 US_{239}	—	October 26, 2008	Kitt Peak	Spacewatch	·	3.9 km	MPC · JPL
239617	2008 UM_{245}	—	October 26, 2008	Kitt Peak	Spacewatch	·	1.7 km	MPC · JPL
239618	2008 UT_{250}	—	October 27, 2008	Kitt Peak	Spacewatch	EOS	4.8 km	MPC · JPL
239619	2008 US_{253}	—	October 27, 2008	Kitt Peak	Spacewatch	(5)	1.3 km	MPC · JPL
239620	2008 UR_{270}	—	October 28, 2008	Mount Lemmon	Mount Lemmon Survey	·	2.9 km	MPC · JPL
239621	2008 UO_{290}	—	October 28, 2008	Kitt Peak	Spacewatch	·	1.3 km	MPC · JPL
239622	2008 UZ_{320}	—	October 31, 2008	Kitt Peak	Spacewatch	(40134)	2.5 km	MPC · JPL
239623	2008 UG_{338}	—	October 21, 2008	Mount Lemmon	Mount Lemmon Survey	·	2.7 km	MPC · JPL
239624	2008 UZ_{351}	—	October 26, 2008	Catalina	CSS	·	3.6 km	MPC · JPL
239625	2008 UR_{358}	—	October 26, 2008	Mount Lemmon	Mount Lemmon Survey	·	2.3 km	MPC · JPL
239626	2008 UK_{369}	—	October 28, 2008	Kitt Peak	Spacewatch	·	2.0 km	MPC · JPL
239627	2008 VW_{1}	—	November 2, 2008	Socorro	LINEAR	·	1.6 km	MPC · JPL
239628	2008 VM_{10}	—	November 2, 2008	Mount Lemmon	Mount Lemmon Survey	·	1.4 km	MPC · JPL
239629	2008 VB_{11}	—	November 2, 2008	Mount Lemmon	Mount Lemmon Survey	·	1.8 km	MPC · JPL
239630	2008 VV_{14}	—	November 5, 2008	Bisei SG Center	BATTeRS	V	940 m	MPC · JPL
239631	2008 VU_{41}	—	November 3, 2008	Mount Lemmon	Mount Lemmon Survey	·	1.3 km	MPC · JPL
239632	2008 VW_{59}	—	November 7, 2008	Catalina	CSS	·	1.4 km	MPC · JPL
239633	2008 VN_{70}	—	November 7, 2008	Mount Lemmon	Mount Lemmon Survey	·	2.1 km	MPC · JPL
239634	2008 VD_{76}	—	November 1, 2008	Mount Lemmon	Mount Lemmon Survey	·	1.6 km	MPC · JPL
239635	2008 WW_{12}	—	November 19, 2008	Bisei SG Center	BATTeRS	·	2.6 km	MPC · JPL
239636	2008 WX_{13}	—	November 20, 2008	Mount Lemmon	Mount Lemmon Survey	·	4.4 km	MPC · JPL
239637	2008 WP_{24}	—	November 18, 2008	Kitt Peak	Spacewatch	·	1.4 km	MPC · JPL
239638	2008 WT_{25}	—	November 18, 2008	Socorro	LINEAR	·	1.7 km	MPC · JPL
239639	2008 WF_{35}	—	November 17, 2008	Kitt Peak	Spacewatch	NYS	1.7 km	MPC · JPL
239640	2008 WV_{38}	—	November 17, 2008	Kitt Peak	Spacewatch	·	1.2 km	MPC · JPL
239641	2008 WX_{41}	—	November 17, 2008	Kitt Peak	Spacewatch	·	1.2 km	MPC · JPL
239642	2008 WO_{45}	—	November 17, 2008	Kitt Peak	Spacewatch	·	3.7 km	MPC · JPL
239643	2008 WQ_{46}	—	November 17, 2008	Kitt Peak	Spacewatch	KOR	1.8 km	MPC · JPL
239644	2008 WX_{53}	—	November 19, 2008	Kitt Peak	Spacewatch	EUN	1.4 km	MPC · JPL
239645 Shandongas	2008 WQ_{58}	Shandongas	November 20, 2008	Weihai	University, Shandong	·	4.4 km	MPC · JPL
239646	2008 WS_{66}	—	November 18, 2008	Kitt Peak	Spacewatch	·	2.0 km	MPC · JPL
239647	2008 WW_{66}	—	November 18, 2008	Kitt Peak	Spacewatch	(5)	1.6 km	MPC · JPL
239648	2008 WJ_{68}	—	November 18, 2008	Kitt Peak	Spacewatch	·	3.3 km	MPC · JPL
239649	2008 WB_{69}	—	November 18, 2008	Kitt Peak	Spacewatch	·	1.8 km	MPC · JPL
239650	2008 WT_{70}	—	November 18, 2008	Kitt Peak	Spacewatch	·	1.3 km	MPC · JPL
239651	2008 WK_{76}	—	November 20, 2008	Kitt Peak	Spacewatch	·	1.1 km	MPC · JPL
239652	2008 WA_{94}	—	November 24, 2008	Sierra Stars	Tozzi, F.	MAR	1.4 km	MPC · JPL
239653	2008 WF_{98}	—	November 21, 2008	Catalina	CSS	·	5.5 km	MPC · JPL
239654	2008 WX_{100}	—	November 24, 2008	Socorro	LINEAR	THM	3.5 km	MPC · JPL
239655	2008 WQ_{107}	—	November 30, 2008	Mount Lemmon	Mount Lemmon Survey	·	2.5 km	MPC · JPL
239656	2008 WR_{123}	—	November 30, 2008	Mount Lemmon	Mount Lemmon Survey	·	2.4 km	MPC · JPL
239657	2008 WL_{124}	—	November 24, 2008	La Sagra	OAM	·	3.7 km	MPC · JPL
239658	2008 WG_{125}	—	November 30, 2008	Kitt Peak	Spacewatch	·	1.9 km	MPC · JPL
239659	2008 WM_{130}	—	November 22, 2008	Kitt Peak	Spacewatch	AGN	1.6 km	MPC · JPL
239660	2008 WR_{132}	—	November 20, 2008	Catalina	CSS	·	2.3 km	MPC · JPL
239661	2008 WQ_{134}	—	November 24, 2008	Mount Lemmon	Mount Lemmon Survey	·	1.9 km	MPC · JPL
239662	2008 WU_{134}	—	November 30, 2008	Kitt Peak	Spacewatch	·	1.5 km	MPC · JPL
239663	2008 WV_{135}	—	November 19, 2008	Kitt Peak	Spacewatch	THM	2.5 km	MPC · JPL
239664	2008 XE	—	December 1, 2008	Tzec Maun	L. Elenin	·	4.0 km	MPC · JPL
239665	2008 XJ_{36}	—	December 2, 2008	Kitt Peak	Spacewatch	GEF	1.8 km	MPC · JPL
239666	2008 XS_{39}	—	December 2, 2008	Kitt Peak	Spacewatch	KOR	1.6 km	MPC · JPL
239667	2008 XT_{51}	—	December 5, 2008	Catalina	CSS	·	4.9 km	MPC · JPL
239668	2008 XU_{53}	—	December 1, 2008	Socorro	LINEAR	THM	2.6 km	MPC · JPL
239669	2008 XZ_{55}	—	December 1, 2008	Kitt Peak	Spacewatch	·	1.6 km	MPC · JPL
239670	2008 XC_{56}	—	December 3, 2008	Mount Lemmon	Mount Lemmon Survey	·	4.6 km	MPC · JPL
239671	2008 XD_{56}	—	December 3, 2008	Mount Lemmon	Mount Lemmon Survey	·	3.5 km	MPC · JPL
239672 SOFIA	2008 YS_{1}	SOFIA	December 21, 2008	Calar Alto	F. Hormuth	615	2.1 km	MPC · JPL
239673	2008 YV_{22}	—	December 21, 2008	Mount Lemmon	Mount Lemmon Survey	KOR	1.7 km	MPC · JPL
239674	2008 YD_{23}	—	December 18, 2008	La Sagra	OAM	·	2.8 km	MPC · JPL
239675 Mottez	2008 YW_{24}	Mottez	December 26, 2008	Saint-Sulpice	B. Christophe	·	2.0 km	MPC · JPL
239676	2008 YM_{32}	—	December 30, 2008	Purple Mountain	PMO NEO Survey Program	·	2.9 km	MPC · JPL
239677	2008 YM_{37}	—	December 22, 2008	Kitt Peak	Spacewatch	GEF	1.9 km	MPC · JPL
239678	2008 YW_{51}	—	December 29, 2008	Mount Lemmon	Mount Lemmon Survey	·	1.7 km	MPC · JPL
239679	2008 YA_{55}	—	December 29, 2008	Mount Lemmon	Mount Lemmon Survey	·	3.5 km	MPC · JPL
239680	2008 YM_{57}	—	December 30, 2008	Kitt Peak	Spacewatch	·	4.5 km	MPC · JPL
239681	2008 YL_{60}	—	December 30, 2008	Mount Lemmon	Mount Lemmon Survey	·	3.3 km	MPC · JPL
239682	2008 YY_{63}	—	December 30, 2008	Mount Lemmon	Mount Lemmon Survey	·	2.1 km	MPC · JPL
239683	2008 YA_{64}	—	December 30, 2008	Mount Lemmon	Mount Lemmon Survey	·	4.6 km	MPC · JPL
239684	2008 YR_{80}	—	December 30, 2008	Kitt Peak	Spacewatch	KOR	2.0 km	MPC · JPL
239685	2008 YJ_{86}	—	December 29, 2008	Kitt Peak	Spacewatch	·	1.5 km	MPC · JPL
239686	2008 YE_{90}	—	December 29, 2008	Kitt Peak	Spacewatch	·	1.9 km	MPC · JPL
239687	2008 YJ_{100}	—	December 29, 2008	Kitt Peak	Spacewatch	·	1.7 km	MPC · JPL
239688	2008 YZ_{101}	—	December 29, 2008	Kitt Peak	Spacewatch	·	2.7 km	MPC · JPL
239689	2008 YC_{104}	—	December 29, 2008	Kitt Peak	Spacewatch	·	3.2 km	MPC · JPL
239690	2008 YC_{111}	—	December 31, 2008	Kitt Peak	Spacewatch	·	2.0 km	MPC · JPL
239691	2008 YY_{120}	—	December 30, 2008	Kitt Peak	Spacewatch	·	1.4 km	MPC · JPL
239692	2008 YV_{124}	—	December 30, 2008	Kitt Peak	Spacewatch	3:2 · SHU	6.9 km	MPC · JPL
239693	2008 YP_{132}	—	December 31, 2008	Catalina	CSS	CYB	5.4 km	MPC · JPL
239694	2008 YL_{139}	—	December 30, 2008	Kitt Peak	Spacewatch	·	3.1 km	MPC · JPL
239695	2008 YJ_{144}	—	December 30, 2008	Kitt Peak	Spacewatch	·	3.0 km	MPC · JPL
239696	2008 YN_{146}	—	December 30, 2008	Kitt Peak	Spacewatch	·	3.6 km	MPC · JPL
239697	2008 YV_{146}	—	December 31, 2008	Kitt Peak	Spacewatch	·	1.7 km	MPC · JPL
239698	2008 YA_{155}	—	December 22, 2008	Mount Lemmon	Mount Lemmon Survey	·	3.1 km	MPC · JPL
239699	2008 YF_{156}	—	December 29, 2008	Kitt Peak	Spacewatch	KOR	1.7 km	MPC · JPL
239700	2008 YU_{156}	—	December 30, 2008	Kitt Peak	Spacewatch	·	2.1 km	MPC · JPL

== 239701–239800 ==
back to top

Designation			Discovery			Properties		Ref
Permanent	Provisional	Named after	Date	Site	Discoverer(s)	Category	Diam.	Ref
239701	2008 YC_{157}	—	December 22, 2008	Kitt Peak	Spacewatch	·	2.2 km	MPC · JPL
239702	2008 YM_{163}	—	December 30, 2008	Kitt Peak	Spacewatch	·	1.9 km	MPC · JPL
239703	2008 YZ_{167}	—	December 21, 2008	Catalina	CSS	HOF	3.4 km	MPC · JPL
239704	2008 YG_{168}	—	December 30, 2008	Catalina	CSS	·	4.5 km	MPC · JPL
239705	2009 AS_{1}	—	January 3, 2009	Sierra Stars	Tozzi, F.	EUN	1.6 km	MPC · JPL
239706	2009 AB_{2}	—	January 3, 2009	Dauban	Kugel, F.	·	2.2 km	MPC · JPL
239707	2009 AP_{4}	—	January 1, 2009	Kitt Peak	Spacewatch	·	4.1 km	MPC · JPL
239708	2009 AS_{10}	—	January 2, 2009	Mount Lemmon	Mount Lemmon Survey	·	2.7 km	MPC · JPL
239709	2009 AZ_{16}	—	January 2, 2009	Catalina	CSS	·	1.5 km	MPC · JPL
239710	2009 AM_{25}	—	January 2, 2009	Kitt Peak	Spacewatch	KOR	1.7 km	MPC · JPL
239711	2009 AA_{30}	—	January 15, 2009	Kitt Peak	Spacewatch	·	2.1 km	MPC · JPL
239712	2009 AZ_{40}	—	January 15, 2009	Kitt Peak	Spacewatch	·	2.4 km	MPC · JPL
239713	2009 AD_{43}	—	January 3, 2009	Kitt Peak	Spacewatch	·	3.8 km	MPC · JPL
239714	2009 AY_{45}	—	January 2, 2009	Mount Lemmon	Mount Lemmon Survey	CYB	5.3 km	MPC · JPL
239715	2009 BT_{2}	—	January 19, 2009	Mayhill	Lowe, A.	THM	3.0 km	MPC · JPL
239716 Felixbaumgartner	2009 BF_{12}	Felixbaumgartner	January 25, 2009	Gaisberg	Gierlinger, R.	AGN	1.4 km	MPC · JPL
239717	2009 BM_{15}	—	January 16, 2009	Mount Lemmon	Mount Lemmon Survey	·	1.7 km	MPC · JPL
239718	2009 BU_{18}	—	January 16, 2009	Mount Lemmon	Mount Lemmon Survey	·	1.8 km	MPC · JPL
239719	2009 BN_{21}	—	January 16, 2009	Kitt Peak	Spacewatch	·	4.0 km	MPC · JPL
239720	2009 BP_{35}	—	January 16, 2009	Kitt Peak	Spacewatch	·	4.0 km	MPC · JPL
239721	2009 BP_{50}	—	January 16, 2009	Mount Lemmon	Mount Lemmon Survey	·	2.1 km	MPC · JPL
239722	2009 BD_{51}	—	January 16, 2009	Mount Lemmon	Mount Lemmon Survey	·	4.0 km	MPC · JPL
239723	2009 BR_{53}	—	January 16, 2009	Mount Lemmon	Mount Lemmon Survey	HYG	4.4 km	MPC · JPL
239724	2009 BY_{69}	—	January 25, 2009	Catalina	CSS	·	2.9 km	MPC · JPL
239725	2009 BO_{91}	—	January 25, 2009	Kitt Peak	Spacewatch	·	3.6 km	MPC · JPL
239726	2009 BZ_{114}	—	January 26, 2009	Kitt Peak	Spacewatch	·	2.4 km	MPC · JPL
239727	2009 BP_{115}	—	January 29, 2009	Kitt Peak	Spacewatch	·	2.6 km	MPC · JPL
239728	2009 BG_{143}	—	January 30, 2009	Kitt Peak	Spacewatch	·	3.6 km	MPC · JPL
239729	2009 BZ_{150}	—	January 28, 2009	Catalina	CSS	EOS	3.3 km	MPC · JPL
239730	2009 BL_{170}	—	January 16, 2009	Kitt Peak	Spacewatch	T_{j} (2.98)	4.2 km	MPC · JPL
239731	2009 BR_{173}	—	January 20, 2009	Catalina	CSS	ARM	5.9 km	MPC · JPL
239732	2009 BG_{177}	—	January 28, 2009	Kitt Peak	Spacewatch	·	5.1 km	MPC · JPL
239733	2009 CY_{15}	—	February 3, 2009	Kitt Peak	Spacewatch	·	5.6 km	MPC · JPL
239734	2009 CG_{34}	—	February 2, 2009	Mount Lemmon	Mount Lemmon Survey	·	3.7 km	MPC · JPL
239735	2009 CH_{44}	—	February 14, 2009	Kitt Peak	Spacewatch	ULA · CYB	6.6 km	MPC · JPL
239736	2009 CK_{57}	—	February 1, 2009	Catalina	CSS	URS	4.1 km	MPC · JPL
239737	2009 DB_{6}	—	February 17, 2009	Kitt Peak	Spacewatch	VER	4.7 km	MPC · JPL
239738	2009 DJ_{10}	—	February 20, 2009	Socorro	LINEAR	·	3.5 km	MPC · JPL
239739	2009 DB_{51}	—	February 20, 2009	Kitt Peak	Spacewatch	EUP	6.7 km	MPC · JPL
239740	2009 EL_{3}	—	March 14, 2009	La Sagra	OAM	·	5.3 km	MPC · JPL
239741	2009 FF_{7}	—	March 16, 2009	Kitt Peak	Spacewatch	·	2.6 km	MPC · JPL
239742	2009 FO_{30}	—	March 25, 2009	Sierra Stars	Tozzi, F.	·	4.9 km	MPC · JPL
239743	2009 FP_{43}	—	March 30, 2009	Sierra Stars	Tozzi, F.	·	3.0 km	MPC · JPL
239744	2009 WQ_{166}	—	November 21, 2009	Mount Lemmon	Mount Lemmon Survey	AGN	2.2 km	MPC · JPL
239745	2009 XD_{15}	—	December 15, 2009	Mount Lemmon	Mount Lemmon Survey	NYS	1.3 km	MPC · JPL
239746	2009 YF_{4}	—	December 17, 2009	Mount Lemmon	Mount Lemmon Survey	·	3.2 km	MPC · JPL
239747	2009 YZ_{11}	—	December 18, 2009	Mount Lemmon	Mount Lemmon Survey	·	1.0 km	MPC · JPL
239748	2009 YH_{16}	—	December 19, 2009	Mount Lemmon	Mount Lemmon Survey	NYS	1.3 km	MPC · JPL
239749	2009 YS_{24}	—	December 18, 2009	Mount Lemmon	Mount Lemmon Survey	MAS	960 m	MPC · JPL
239750	2010 AZ_{2}	—	January 7, 2010	Mayhill	Lowe, A.	·	2.0 km	MPC · JPL
239751	2010 AV_{18}	—	January 7, 2010	Mount Lemmon	Mount Lemmon Survey	·	3.0 km	MPC · JPL
239752	2010 AM_{31}	—	January 6, 2010	Kitt Peak	Spacewatch	V	1.1 km	MPC · JPL
239753	2010 AW_{43}	—	January 6, 2010	Catalina	CSS	·	1.7 km	MPC · JPL
239754	2010 AB_{53}	—	January 8, 2010	Kitt Peak	Spacewatch	·	1.8 km	MPC · JPL
239755	2010 AT_{55}	—	January 8, 2010	Kitt Peak	Spacewatch	·	3.2 km	MPC · JPL
239756	2010 AN_{59}	—	January 6, 2010	Catalina	CSS	H	820 m	MPC · JPL
239757	2010 AG_{74}	—	January 13, 2010	Socorro	LINEAR	·	1.9 km	MPC · JPL
239758	2010 AU_{75}	—	January 10, 2010	Socorro	LINEAR	EUN	1.7 km	MPC · JPL
239759	2010 BY_{2}	—	January 21, 2010	La Sagra	OAM	(10369)	4.4 km	MPC · JPL
239760	2010 CX_{3}	—	February 6, 2010	Mount Lemmon	Mount Lemmon Survey	·	920 m	MPC · JPL
239761	2010 CU_{18}	—	February 13, 2010	Mayhill	Mayhill	·	3.4 km	MPC · JPL
239762	2010 CV_{18}	—	February 13, 2010	Mayhill	Mayhill	·	1.8 km	MPC · JPL
239763	2010 CZ_{28}	—	February 9, 2010	Kitt Peak	Spacewatch	·	1.1 km	MPC · JPL
239764	2010 CD_{29}	—	February 9, 2010	Kitt Peak	Spacewatch	EOS	5.1 km	MPC · JPL
239765	2010 CO_{34}	—	February 10, 2010	Kitt Peak	Spacewatch	EUN	2.0 km	MPC · JPL
239766	2010 CT_{40}	—	February 13, 2010	Kitt Peak	Spacewatch	·	2.0 km	MPC · JPL
239767	2010 CW_{40}	—	February 13, 2010	Kitt Peak	Spacewatch	·	4.8 km	MPC · JPL
239768	2010 CS_{42}	—	February 7, 2010	La Sagra	OAM	·	4.6 km	MPC · JPL
239769	2010 CX_{56}	—	February 13, 2010	Socorro	LINEAR	·	3.1 km	MPC · JPL
239770	2010 CK_{57}	—	February 14, 2010	Socorro	LINEAR	H	830 m	MPC · JPL
239771	2010 CR_{58}	—	February 13, 2010	Socorro	LINEAR	·	2.7 km	MPC · JPL
239772	2010 CL_{62}	—	February 9, 2010	Catalina	CSS	·	4.8 km	MPC · JPL
239773	2010 CN_{65}	—	February 9, 2010	Kitt Peak	Spacewatch	·	2.5 km	MPC · JPL
239774	2010 CY_{68}	—	February 10, 2010	Kitt Peak	Spacewatch	·	2.4 km	MPC · JPL
239775	2010 CF_{69}	—	February 12, 2010	La Sagra	OAM	·	3.7 km	MPC · JPL
239776	2010 CB_{76}	—	February 13, 2010	Catalina	CSS	MAR	1.8 km	MPC · JPL
239777	2010 CW_{82}	—	February 13, 2010	Črni Vrh	Skvarč, J.	·	4.9 km	MPC · JPL
239778	2010 CK_{94}	—	February 14, 2010	Kitt Peak	Spacewatch	·	1.8 km	MPC · JPL
239779	2010 CU_{94}	—	February 14, 2010	Kitt Peak	Spacewatch	·	3.0 km	MPC · JPL
239780	2010 CB_{95}	—	February 14, 2010	Kitt Peak	Spacewatch	·	2.2 km	MPC · JPL
239781	2010 CD_{99}	—	February 14, 2010	Kitt Peak	Spacewatch	·	2.2 km	MPC · JPL
239782	2010 CZ_{103}	—	February 14, 2010	Kitt Peak	Spacewatch	·	2.0 km	MPC · JPL
239783	2010 CJ_{117}	—	February 14, 2010	Mount Lemmon	Mount Lemmon Survey	·	2.4 km	MPC · JPL
239784	2010 CP_{156}	—	February 15, 2010	Kitt Peak	Spacewatch	·	4.8 km	MPC · JPL
239785	2010 CC_{163}	—	February 9, 2010	Kitt Peak	Spacewatch	NYS	2.1 km	MPC · JPL
239786	2010 CU_{166}	—	February 13, 2010	Kitt Peak	Spacewatch	·	3.1 km	MPC · JPL
239787	2010 CW_{179}	—	February 14, 2010	Mount Lemmon	Mount Lemmon Survey	·	1.5 km	MPC · JPL
239788	2010 DW_{38}	—	February 16, 2010	Kitt Peak	Spacewatch	HNS	1.8 km	MPC · JPL
239789	2010 DB_{45}	—	February 17, 2010	Kitt Peak	Spacewatch	·	1.6 km	MPC · JPL
239790	2010 DY_{76}	—	February 16, 2010	Mount Lemmon	Mount Lemmon Survey	·	1.9 km	MPC · JPL
239791	2010 EW_{33}	—	March 4, 2010	Kitt Peak	Spacewatch	·	1.9 km	MPC · JPL
239792 Hankakováčová	2010 EM_{34}	Hankakováčová	March 9, 2010	LightBuckets	T. Vorobjov	·	2.1 km	MPC · JPL
239793	2010 EV_{40}	—	March 4, 2010	Kitt Peak	Spacewatch	·	1.2 km	MPC · JPL
239794	6715 P-L	—	September 24, 1960	Palomar	C. J. van Houten, I. van Houten-Groeneveld, T. Gehrels	V	870 m	MPC · JPL
239795	1273 T-2	—	September 29, 1973	Palomar	C. J. van Houten, I. van Houten-Groeneveld, T. Gehrels	·	1.1 km	MPC · JPL
239796	2300 T-3	—	October 16, 1977	Palomar	C. J. van Houten, I. van Houten-Groeneveld, T. Gehrels	·	2.2 km	MPC · JPL
239797	3037 T-3	—	October 16, 1977	Palomar	C. J. van Houten, I. van Houten-Groeneveld, T. Gehrels	·	2.1 km	MPC · JPL
239798	1981 EZ_{31}	—	March 6, 1981	Siding Spring	S. J. Bus	·	5.0 km	MPC · JPL
239799	1993 OU_{9}	—	July 20, 1993	La Silla	E. W. Elst	·	4.1 km	MPC · JPL
239800	1993 PR_{1}	—	August 14, 1993	Kitt Peak	Spacewatch	·	2.5 km	MPC · JPL

== 239801–239900 ==
back to top

Designation			Discovery			Properties		Ref
Permanent	Provisional	Named after	Date	Site	Discoverer(s)	Category	Diam.	Ref
239801	1994 CA_{11}	—	February 7, 1994	La Silla	E. W. Elst	·	2.4 km	MPC · JPL
239802	1995 UD_{14}	—	October 17, 1995	Kitt Peak	Spacewatch	·	2.4 km	MPC · JPL
239803	1995 WE_{4}	—	November 16, 1995	Kitt Peak	Spacewatch	·	1.0 km	MPC · JPL
239804	1995 WL_{18}	—	November 17, 1995	Kitt Peak	Spacewatch	·	2.3 km	MPC · JPL
239805	1995 XB_{5}	—	December 14, 1995	Kitt Peak	Spacewatch	·	1.3 km	MPC · JPL
239806	1996 GJ_{5}	—	April 11, 1996	Kitt Peak	Spacewatch	GEF	1.9 km	MPC · JPL
239807	1996 PG	—	August 7, 1996	Prescott	P. G. Comba	·	1.7 km	MPC · JPL
239808	1996 TK_{9}	—	October 12, 1996	Kleť	Kleť	·	3.0 km	MPC · JPL
239809	1997 AY_{12}	—	January 10, 1997	Oizumi	T. Kobayashi	·	2.3 km	MPC · JPL
239810	1997 EC_{26}	—	March 11, 1997	Cloudcroft	W. Offutt	·	2.6 km	MPC · JPL
239811	1997 MR_{2}	—	June 28, 1997	Socorro	LINEAR	·	2.1 km	MPC · JPL
239812	1997 PP	—	August 1, 1997	Haleakala	NEAT	·	1.4 km	MPC · JPL
239813	1997 TG_{11}	—	October 3, 1997	Kitt Peak	Spacewatch	·	780 m	MPC · JPL
239814	1997 WC_{12}	—	November 22, 1997	Kitt Peak	Spacewatch	·	1.5 km	MPC · JPL
239815	1997 WO_{15}	—	November 23, 1997	Kitt Peak	Spacewatch	KOR	1.7 km	MPC · JPL
239816	1998 BJ_{5}	—	January 18, 1998	Kitt Peak	Spacewatch	·	1.5 km	MPC · JPL
239817	1998 BZ_{33}	—	January 31, 1998	Kleť	Kleť	·	2.8 km	MPC · JPL
239818	1998 FD_{92}	—	March 24, 1998	Socorro	LINEAR	·	4.0 km	MPC · JPL
239819	1998 MH_{23}	—	June 24, 1998	Kitt Peak	Spacewatch	·	1.6 km	MPC · JPL
239820	1998 OA_{2}	—	July 16, 1998	Kitt Peak	Spacewatch	·	1.6 km	MPC · JPL
239821	1998 RD_{11}	—	September 13, 1998	Kitt Peak	Spacewatch	EUN	1.7 km	MPC · JPL
239822	1998 RY_{31}	—	September 14, 1998	Socorro	LINEAR	·	3.0 km	MPC · JPL
239823	1998 RX_{47}	—	September 14, 1998	Socorro	LINEAR	·	1.6 km	MPC · JPL
239824	1998 SE_{51}	—	September 26, 1998	Kitt Peak	Spacewatch	·	2.3 km	MPC · JPL
239825	1998 SO_{133}	—	September 26, 1998	Socorro	LINEAR	·	980 m	MPC · JPL
239826	1998 UZ_{25}	—	October 18, 1998	La Silla	E. W. Elst	·	5.0 km	MPC · JPL
239827	1998 VL_{10}	—	November 10, 1998	Socorro	LINEAR	·	2.7 km	MPC · JPL
239828	1998 VW_{42}	—	November 15, 1998	Kitt Peak	Spacewatch	·	2.2 km	MPC · JPL
239829	1998 WK_{29}	—	November 23, 1998	Kitt Peak	Spacewatch	·	2.9 km	MPC · JPL
239830	1998 XK_{2}	—	December 8, 1998	Kitt Peak	Spacewatch	·	3.1 km	MPC · JPL
239831	1998 YX_{4}	—	December 17, 1998	Caussols	ODAS	·	960 m	MPC · JPL
239832	1998 YS_{31}	—	December 23, 1998	Kitt Peak	Spacewatch	·	2.0 km	MPC · JPL
239833	1999 BD_{30}	—	January 19, 1999	Kitt Peak	Spacewatch	·	1.0 km	MPC · JPL
239834	1999 ET_{6}	—	March 14, 1999	Kitt Peak	Spacewatch	·	1.3 km	MPC · JPL
239835	1999 FU_{10}	—	March 16, 1999	Kitt Peak	Spacewatch	·	2.6 km	MPC · JPL
239836	1999 FY_{83}	—	March 20, 1999	Apache Point	SDSS	URS	6.6 km	MPC · JPL
239837	1999 FX_{90}	—	March 21, 1999	Apache Point	SDSS	·	4.6 km	MPC · JPL
239838	1999 GL_{33}	—	April 12, 1999	Socorro	LINEAR	·	3.3 km	MPC · JPL
239839	1999 LF_{2}	—	June 8, 1999	Socorro	LINEAR	T_{j} (2.97)	5.2 km	MPC · JPL
239840	1999 NC_{56}	—	July 12, 1999	Socorro	LINEAR	PHO	3.4 km	MPC · JPL
239841	1999 RQ_{191}	—	September 11, 1999	Socorro	LINEAR	·	1.5 km	MPC · JPL
239842	1999 SM_{21}	—	September 30, 1999	Kitt Peak	Spacewatch	·	1.3 km	MPC · JPL
239843	1999 TR_{71}	—	October 9, 1999	Kitt Peak	Spacewatch	·	2.6 km	MPC · JPL
239844	1999 TP_{132}	—	October 6, 1999	Socorro	LINEAR	·	3.5 km	MPC · JPL
239845	1999 TX_{132}	—	October 6, 1999	Socorro	LINEAR	T_{j} (2.99) · 3:2 · SHU	9.2 km	MPC · JPL
239846	1999 TZ_{175}	—	October 10, 1999	Socorro	LINEAR	·	2.2 km	MPC · JPL
239847	1999 TC_{191}	—	October 12, 1999	Socorro	LINEAR	·	2.8 km	MPC · JPL
239848	1999 TC_{221}	—	October 2, 1999	Catalina	CSS	TIR	2.5 km	MPC · JPL
239849	1999 VO_{11}	—	November 7, 1999	Socorro	LINEAR	APO	450 m	MPC · JPL
239850	1999 VZ_{89}	—	November 5, 1999	Socorro	LINEAR	T_{j} (2.98)	7.1 km	MPC · JPL
239851	1999 VG_{152}	—	November 9, 1999	Kitt Peak	Spacewatch	ADE	3.3 km	MPC · JPL
239852	1999 VR_{190}	—	November 15, 1999	Socorro	LINEAR	JUN	1.7 km	MPC · JPL
239853	1999 VC_{202}	—	November 4, 1999	Kitt Peak	Spacewatch	·	2.1 km	MPC · JPL
239854	1999 VL_{214}	—	November 1, 1999	Kitt Peak	Spacewatch	·	1.1 km	MPC · JPL
239855	1999 WA_{19}	—	November 30, 1999	Kitt Peak	Spacewatch	·	3.3 km	MPC · JPL
239856	1999 XJ_{28}	—	December 6, 1999	Socorro	LINEAR	EUN	1.9 km	MPC · JPL
239857	1999 XJ_{104}	—	December 7, 1999	Socorro	LINEAR	JUN	1.7 km	MPC · JPL
239858	1999 XV_{145}	—	December 7, 1999	Kitt Peak	Spacewatch	·	2.0 km	MPC · JPL
239859	1999 XF_{213}	—	December 14, 1999	Socorro	LINEAR	ADE	3.9 km	MPC · JPL
239860	1999 YA_{15}	—	December 31, 1999	Kitt Peak	Spacewatch	·	2.3 km	MPC · JPL
239861	2000 AL_{123}	—	January 5, 2000	Socorro	LINEAR	·	2.7 km	MPC · JPL
239862	2000 AX_{219}	—	January 8, 2000	Kitt Peak	Spacewatch	·	2.0 km	MPC · JPL
239863	2000 AK_{224}	—	January 10, 2000	Kitt Peak	Spacewatch	·	1.5 km	MPC · JPL
239864	2000 BL_{13}	—	January 29, 2000	Kitt Peak	Spacewatch	·	2.6 km	MPC · JPL
239865	2000 CY_{26}	—	February 2, 2000	Socorro	LINEAR	·	3.7 km	MPC · JPL
239866	2000 CY_{98}	—	February 8, 2000	Kitt Peak	Spacewatch	·	2.4 km	MPC · JPL
239867	2000 CQ_{125}	—	February 3, 2000	Socorro	LINEAR	·	2.8 km	MPC · JPL
239868	2000 EM_{74}	—	March 10, 2000	Kitt Peak	Spacewatch	·	960 m	MPC · JPL
239869	2000 GD_{53}	—	April 5, 2000	Socorro	LINEAR	·	1.0 km	MPC · JPL
239870	2000 HD_{29}	—	April 26, 2000	Kitt Peak	Spacewatch	·	860 m	MPC · JPL
239871	2000 HU_{52}	—	April 29, 2000	Socorro	LINEAR	·	1.2 km	MPC · JPL
239872	2000 JY_{11}	—	May 5, 2000	Socorro	LINEAR	·	990 m	MPC · JPL
239873	2000 JO_{67}	—	May 5, 2000	Kitt Peak	Spacewatch	·	5.2 km	MPC · JPL
239874	2000 JN_{83}	—	May 6, 2000	Socorro	LINEAR	·	920 m	MPC · JPL
239875	2000 KQ_{78}	—	May 27, 2000	Socorro	LINEAR	·	1.2 km	MPC · JPL
239876	2000 NW	—	July 4, 2000	Prescott	P. G. Comba	·	1.3 km	MPC · JPL
239877	2000 NH_{4}	—	July 3, 2000	Kitt Peak	Spacewatch	·	1.2 km	MPC · JPL
239878	2000 OV_{8}	—	July 30, 2000	Socorro	LINEAR	·	4.9 km	MPC · JPL
239879	2000 PL_{14}	—	August 1, 2000	Socorro	LINEAR	V	1.0 km	MPC · JPL
239880	2000 QM_{35}	—	August 28, 2000	Višnjan	K. Korlević	·	1.3 km	MPC · JPL
239881	2000 QW_{55}	—	August 25, 2000	Socorro	LINEAR	·	1.5 km	MPC · JPL
239882	2000 QU_{66}	—	August 28, 2000	Socorro	LINEAR	·	5.4 km	MPC · JPL
239883	2000 QS_{92}	—	August 25, 2000	Socorro	LINEAR	·	1.7 km	MPC · JPL
239884	2000 QX_{119}	—	August 25, 2000	Socorro	LINEAR	·	950 m	MPC · JPL
239885	2000 QN_{141}	—	August 31, 2000	Socorro	LINEAR	·	2.7 km	MPC · JPL
239886	2000 QW_{160}	—	August 31, 2000	Socorro	LINEAR	·	1.2 km	MPC · JPL
239887	2000 QU_{163}	—	August 31, 2000	Socorro	LINEAR	PHO	1.5 km	MPC · JPL
239888	2000 QE_{171}	—	August 31, 2000	Socorro	LINEAR	·	2.8 km	MPC · JPL
239889	2000 RF	—	September 1, 2000	Socorro	LINEAR	H	650 m	MPC · JPL
239890 Edudeldon	2000 RX_{11}	Edudeldon	September 1, 2000	Saltsjobaden	A. Brandeker	·	1.1 km	MPC · JPL
239891	2000 RW_{17}	—	September 1, 2000	Socorro	LINEAR	·	6.0 km	MPC · JPL
239892	2000 RE_{65}	—	September 1, 2000	Socorro	LINEAR	·	4.2 km	MPC · JPL
239893	2000 RO_{74}	—	September 3, 2000	Socorro	LINEAR	·	1.5 km	MPC · JPL
239894	2000 RD_{75}	—	September 3, 2000	Socorro	LINEAR	·	5.2 km	MPC · JPL
239895	2000 SF_{32}	—	September 24, 2000	Socorro	LINEAR	·	4.1 km	MPC · JPL
239896	2000 SD_{52}	—	September 23, 2000	Socorro	LINEAR	·	2.4 km	MPC · JPL
239897	2000 SG_{62}	—	September 24, 2000	Socorro	LINEAR	·	3.5 km	MPC · JPL
239898	2000 ST_{62}	—	September 24, 2000	Socorro	LINEAR	NYS	1.5 km	MPC · JPL
239899	2000 SL_{78}	—	September 24, 2000	Socorro	LINEAR	·	1.6 km	MPC · JPL
239900	2000 SP_{87}	—	September 24, 2000	Socorro	LINEAR	·	1.3 km	MPC · JPL

== 239901–240000 ==
back to top

Designation			Discovery			Properties		Ref
Permanent	Provisional	Named after	Date	Site	Discoverer(s)	Category	Diam.	Ref
239901	2000 SR_{122}	—	September 24, 2000	Socorro	LINEAR	·	4.4 km	MPC · JPL
239902	2000 SU_{125}	—	September 24, 2000	Socorro	LINEAR	·	1.6 km	MPC · JPL
239903	2000 SF_{129}	—	September 26, 2000	Socorro	LINEAR	L5	12 km	MPC · JPL
239904	2000 SV_{132}	—	September 23, 2000	Socorro	LINEAR	·	5.4 km	MPC · JPL
239905	2000 SP_{151}	—	September 24, 2000	Socorro	LINEAR	·	1.3 km	MPC · JPL
239906	2000 SQ_{161}	—	September 20, 2000	Haleakala	NEAT	·	5.1 km	MPC · JPL
239907	2000 SP_{164}	—	September 26, 2000	Socorro	LINEAR	H	710 m	MPC · JPL
239908	2000 SH_{223}	—	September 27, 2000	Socorro	LINEAR	CYB	4.9 km	MPC · JPL
239909	2000 SN_{233}	—	September 21, 2000	Socorro	LINEAR	·	3.9 km	MPC · JPL
239910	2000 SQ_{240}	—	September 26, 2000	Socorro	LINEAR	PHO	4.3 km	MPC · JPL
239911	2000 SC_{246}	—	September 24, 2000	Socorro	LINEAR	·	4.2 km	MPC · JPL
239912	2000 SV_{254}	—	September 24, 2000	Socorro	LINEAR	NYS	1.4 km	MPC · JPL
239913	2000 SM_{285}	—	September 23, 2000	Socorro	LINEAR	·	4.2 km	MPC · JPL
239914	2000 SX_{323}	—	September 28, 2000	Kitt Peak	Spacewatch	·	1.3 km	MPC · JPL
239915	2000 SA_{334}	—	September 26, 2000	Haleakala	NEAT	·	4.9 km	MPC · JPL
239916	2000 SM_{338}	—	September 25, 2000	Haleakala	NEAT	·	1.3 km	MPC · JPL
239917	2000 TD_{7}	—	October 1, 2000	Socorro	LINEAR	·	4.1 km	MPC · JPL
239918	2000 TC_{40}	—	October 1, 2000	Socorro	LINEAR	·	4.9 km	MPC · JPL
239919	2000 TA_{48}	—	October 1, 2000	Anderson Mesa	LONEOS	·	4.6 km	MPC · JPL
239920	2000 TN_{62}	—	October 2, 2000	Socorro	LINEAR	·	5.0 km	MPC · JPL
239921	2000 UR_{5}	—	October 24, 2000	Socorro	LINEAR	·	4.5 km	MPC · JPL
239922	2000 UW_{33}	—	October 26, 2000	Socorro	LINEAR	H	960 m	MPC · JPL
239923	2000 UK_{34}	—	October 24, 2000	Socorro	LINEAR	·	1.4 km	MPC · JPL
239924	2000 UR_{40}	—	October 24, 2000	Socorro	LINEAR	·	2.4 km	MPC · JPL
239925	2000 UZ_{45}	—	October 24, 2000	Socorro	LINEAR	·	3.8 km	MPC · JPL
239926	2000 UB_{46}	—	October 24, 2000	Socorro	LINEAR	·	3.9 km	MPC · JPL
239927	2000 UZ_{85}	—	October 31, 2000	Socorro	LINEAR	MAS	1.2 km	MPC · JPL
239928	2000 WJ_{21}	—	November 21, 2000	Socorro	LINEAR	H	700 m	MPC · JPL
239929	2000 WO_{90}	—	November 21, 2000	Socorro	LINEAR	·	1.9 km	MPC · JPL
239930	2000 WQ_{138}	—	November 21, 2000	Socorro	LINEAR	·	1.9 km	MPC · JPL
239931	2000 WL_{162}	—	November 20, 2000	Socorro	LINEAR	·	2.8 km	MPC · JPL
239932	2000 WY_{191}	—	November 19, 2000	Anderson Mesa	LONEOS	·	2.3 km	MPC · JPL
239933	2000 XR_{5}	—	December 1, 2000	Socorro	LINEAR	·	1.5 km	MPC · JPL
239934	2000 XD_{36}	—	December 5, 2000	Socorro	LINEAR	·	7.5 km	MPC · JPL
239935	2000 YW_{36}	—	December 30, 2000	Socorro	LINEAR	·	1.8 km	MPC · JPL
239936	2000 YQ_{58}	—	December 30, 2000	Socorro	LINEAR	BRG	2.8 km	MPC · JPL
239937	2000 YP_{82}	—	December 30, 2000	Socorro	LINEAR	TIR ·	6.5 km	MPC · JPL
239938	2001 AE_{9}	—	January 2, 2001	Socorro	LINEAR	(5)	3.5 km	MPC · JPL
239939	2001 AZ_{30}	—	January 4, 2001	Socorro	LINEAR	·	6.5 km	MPC · JPL
239940	2001 BD_{13}	—	January 21, 2001	Socorro	LINEAR	·	1.8 km	MPC · JPL
239941	2001 BN_{16}	—	January 18, 2001	Socorro	LINEAR	(5)	2.1 km	MPC · JPL
239942	2001 CS_{12}	—	February 1, 2001	Socorro	LINEAR	·	1.6 km	MPC · JPL
239943	2001 CU_{26}	—	February 1, 2001	Kitt Peak	Spacewatch	·	1.5 km	MPC · JPL
239944	2001 CV_{29}	—	February 2, 2001	Anderson Mesa	LONEOS	·	2.1 km	MPC · JPL
239945	2001 CZ_{39}	—	February 13, 2001	Socorro	LINEAR	BRG	2.4 km	MPC · JPL
239946	2001 CA_{41}	—	February 15, 2001	Socorro	LINEAR	·	2.3 km	MPC · JPL
239947	2001 DT_{43}	—	February 19, 2001	Socorro	LINEAR	·	2.4 km	MPC · JPL
239948	2001 DB_{87}	—	February 27, 2001	Kitt Peak	Spacewatch	·	1.6 km	MPC · JPL
239949	2001 DC_{107}	—	February 19, 2001	Kitt Peak	Spacewatch	EUN	1.7 km	MPC · JPL
239950	2001 EE_{4}	—	March 2, 2001	Anderson Mesa	LONEOS	EUN	2.1 km	MPC · JPL
239951	2001 FG_{17}	—	March 19, 2001	Anderson Mesa	LONEOS	·	3.3 km	MPC · JPL
239952	2001 FS_{75}	—	March 19, 2001	Socorro	LINEAR	·	2.4 km	MPC · JPL
239953	2001 FU_{95}	—	March 16, 2001	Socorro	LINEAR	·	3.0 km	MPC · JPL
239954	2001 FG_{120}	—	March 28, 2001	Kitt Peak	Spacewatch	·	2.3 km	MPC · JPL
239955	2001 FY_{169}	—	March 24, 2001	Anderson Mesa	LONEOS	·	2.0 km	MPC · JPL
239956	2001 FF_{186}	—	March 16, 2001	Socorro	LINEAR	·	2.9 km	MPC · JPL
239957	2001 GD_{1}	—	April 13, 2001	Socorro	LINEAR	BAR	2.1 km	MPC · JPL
239958	2001 GH_{9}	—	April 15, 2001	Socorro	LINEAR	·	3.8 km	MPC · JPL
239959	2001 GV_{11}	—	April 15, 2001	Haleakala	NEAT	JUN	1.8 km	MPC · JPL
239960	2001 HS_{36}	—	April 29, 2001	Socorro	LINEAR	·	3.3 km	MPC · JPL
239961	2001 JJ_{10}	—	May 15, 2001	Anderson Mesa	LONEOS	·	3.3 km	MPC · JPL
239962	2001 KB_{52}	—	May 16, 2001	Palomar	NEAT	·	1.6 km	MPC · JPL
239963	2001 MX_{1}	—	June 18, 2001	Wise	Wise	·	2.9 km	MPC · JPL
239964	2001 MB_{2}	—	June 19, 2001	Palomar	NEAT	·	3.4 km	MPC · JPL
239965	2001 NC_{6}	—	July 14, 2001	Emerald Lane	L. Ball	·	6.3 km	MPC · JPL
239966	2001 OW_{11}	—	July 18, 2001	Haleakala	NEAT	·	1.6 km	MPC · JPL
239967	2001 PH_{4}	—	August 7, 2001	Haleakala	NEAT	·	1.1 km	MPC · JPL
239968	2001 PM_{33}	—	August 10, 2001	Palomar	NEAT	·	2.5 km	MPC · JPL
239969	2001 PW_{33}	—	August 10, 2001	Palomar	NEAT	·	1.1 km	MPC · JPL
239970	2001 QX_{53}	—	August 16, 2001	Socorro	LINEAR	·	1.6 km	MPC · JPL
239971	2001 QP_{125}	—	August 19, 2001	Socorro	LINEAR	·	1.7 km	MPC · JPL
239972	2001 QF_{157}	—	August 23, 2001	Anderson Mesa	LONEOS	·	990 m	MPC · JPL
239973	2001 QV_{226}	—	August 24, 2001	Anderson Mesa	LONEOS	·	5.1 km	MPC · JPL
239974	2001 QN_{257}	—	August 25, 2001	Socorro	LINEAR	H	670 m	MPC · JPL
239975	2001 QS_{269}	—	August 19, 2001	Kvistaberg	Uppsala-DLR Asteroid Survey	·	1.1 km	MPC · JPL
239976	2001 QU_{293}	—	August 22, 2001	Kiso	Ohba, Y.	·	4.8 km	MPC · JPL
239977	2001 QO_{329}	—	August 23, 2001	Anderson Mesa	LONEOS	·	6.3 km	MPC · JPL
239978	2001 QG_{330}	—	August 25, 2001	Anderson Mesa	LONEOS	·	5.4 km	MPC · JPL
239979	2001 RR_{30}	—	September 7, 2001	Socorro	LINEAR	·	2.3 km	MPC · JPL
239980	2001 RB_{96}	—	September 11, 2001	Kitt Peak	Spacewatch	·	890 m	MPC · JPL
239981	2001 RH_{115}	—	September 12, 2001	Socorro	LINEAR	·	1.1 km	MPC · JPL
239982	2001 RT_{117}	—	September 12, 2001	Socorro	LINEAR	·	980 m	MPC · JPL
239983	2001 RC_{118}	—	September 12, 2001	Socorro	LINEAR	·	2.5 km	MPC · JPL
239984	2001 RH_{126}	—	September 12, 2001	Socorro	LINEAR	·	2.3 km	MPC · JPL
239985	2001 RS_{130}	—	September 12, 2001	Socorro	LINEAR	·	810 m	MPC · JPL
239986	2001 RT_{130}	—	September 12, 2001	Socorro	LINEAR	HOF	3.2 km	MPC · JPL
239987	2001 RF_{138}	—	September 12, 2001	Socorro	LINEAR	HYG	5.1 km	MPC · JPL
239988	2001 RW_{154}	—	September 12, 2001	Kitt Peak	Spacewatch	·	4.6 km	MPC · JPL
239989	2001 SS_{7}	—	September 18, 2001	Kitt Peak	Spacewatch	·	920 m	MPC · JPL
239990	2001 SL_{8}	—	September 18, 2001	Kitt Peak	Spacewatch	·	3.9 km	MPC · JPL
239991	2001 SX_{15}	—	September 16, 2001	Socorro	LINEAR	·	810 m	MPC · JPL
239992	2001 SS_{36}	—	September 16, 2001	Socorro	LINEAR	·	5.3 km	MPC · JPL
239993	2001 SP_{82}	—	September 20, 2001	Socorro	LINEAR	·	5.5 km	MPC · JPL
239994	2001 SH_{90}	—	September 20, 2001	Socorro	LINEAR	·	810 m	MPC · JPL
239995	2001 SC_{193}	—	September 19, 2001	Socorro	LINEAR	·	2.4 km	MPC · JPL
239996	2001 SV_{202}	—	September 19, 2001	Socorro	LINEAR	·	760 m	MPC · JPL
239997	2001 SU_{215}	—	September 19, 2001	Socorro	LINEAR	·	2.7 km	MPC · JPL
239998	2001 SF_{233}	—	September 19, 2001	Socorro	LINEAR	·	1.0 km	MPC · JPL
239999	2001 SR_{233}	—	September 19, 2001	Socorro	LINEAR	·	3.4 km	MPC · JPL
240000	2001 SY_{244}	—	September 19, 2001	Socorro	LINEAR	(260) · CYB	5.6 km	MPC · JPL

back to top

== See also ==
- Meanings of minor-planet names: 239001–240000
