= List of minor planets: 237001–238000 =

The following is a partial list of minor planets, running from minor-planet number 237001 through 238000, inclusive. The primary data for this and other partial lists is based on JPL's "Small-Body Orbital Elements" and data available from the Minor Planet Center. Critical list information is also provided by the MPC, unless otherwise specified from Lowell Observatory. A detailed description of the table's columns and additional sources are given on the main page including a complete list of every page in this series, and a statistical break-up on the dynamical classification of minor planets.

Also see the summary list of all named bodies in numerical and alphabetical order, and the corresponding naming citations for the number range of this particular list. New namings may only be added to this list after official publication, as the preannouncement of names is condemned by the Working Group for Small Bodies Nomenclature of the International Astronomical Union.

Near-Earth obj.	MBA (inner)	MBA (outer)	Centaur
Mars-crosser	MBA (middle)	Jupiter trojan	Trans-Neptunian obj.
Unclassified

== 237001–237100 ==
Designation			Discovery			Properties		Ref
Permanent	Provisional	Named after	Date	Site	Discoverer(s)	Category	Diam.	Ref
237001	2008 RK_{46}	—	September 2, 2008	Kitt Peak	Spacewatch	(21885)	4.2 km	MPC · JPL
237002	2008 RY_{75}	—	September 6, 2008	Mount Lemmon	Mount Lemmon Survey	·	1.1 km	MPC · JPL
237003	2008 RW_{80}	—	September 3, 2008	Kitt Peak	Spacewatch	·	3.7 km	MPC · JPL
237004	2008 RT_{94}	—	September 7, 2008	Mount Lemmon	Mount Lemmon Survey	·	3.8 km	MPC · JPL
237005	2008 RQ_{97}	—	September 7, 2008	Mount Lemmon	Mount Lemmon Survey	·	2.1 km	MPC · JPL
237006	2008 RJ_{102}	—	September 3, 2008	Kitt Peak	Spacewatch	·	2.0 km	MPC · JPL
237007	2008 RB_{104}	—	September 5, 2008	Kitt Peak	Spacewatch	·	3.9 km	MPC · JPL
237008	2008 RL_{104}	—	September 6, 2008	Kitt Peak	Spacewatch	·	6.5 km	MPC · JPL
237009	2008 RR_{107}	—	September 8, 2008	Mount Lemmon	Mount Lemmon Survey	·	1.5 km	MPC · JPL
237010	2008 RK_{114}	—	September 6, 2008	Mount Lemmon	Mount Lemmon Survey	·	1.2 km	MPC · JPL
237011	2008 RW_{118}	—	September 10, 2008	Kitt Peak	Spacewatch	·	2.6 km	MPC · JPL
237012	2008 RT_{125}	—	September 9, 2008	Junk Bond	D. Healy	CLA	2.2 km	MPC · JPL
237013	2008 RX_{140}	—	September 9, 2008	Mount Lemmon	Mount Lemmon Survey	·	2.5 km	MPC · JPL
237014	2008 RU_{144}	—	September 4, 2008	Kitt Peak	Spacewatch	·	1.2 km	MPC · JPL
237015	2008 SL_{2}	—	September 22, 2008	Goodricke-Pigott	R. A. Tucker	·	3.2 km	MPC · JPL
237016	2008 SX_{5}	—	September 22, 2008	Socorro	LINEAR	·	4.0 km	MPC · JPL
237017	2008 SX_{8}	—	September 22, 2008	Socorro	LINEAR	V	920 m	MPC · JPL
237018	2008 SA_{23}	—	September 19, 2008	Kitt Peak	Spacewatch	·	1.4 km	MPC · JPL
237019	2008 SP_{25}	—	September 19, 2008	Kitt Peak	Spacewatch	NYS	1.4 km	MPC · JPL
237020	2008 SK_{26}	—	September 19, 2008	Kitt Peak	Spacewatch	·	2.6 km	MPC · JPL
237021	2008 SK_{27}	—	September 19, 2008	Kitt Peak	Spacewatch	·	1.1 km	MPC · JPL
237022	2008 SA_{36}	—	September 20, 2008	Kitt Peak	Spacewatch	(7744)	1.7 km	MPC · JPL
237023	2008 SV_{38}	—	September 20, 2008	Kitt Peak	Spacewatch	·	2.9 km	MPC · JPL
237024	2008 ST_{39}	—	September 20, 2008	Kitt Peak	Spacewatch	·	2.0 km	MPC · JPL
237025	2008 SY_{39}	—	September 20, 2008	Kitt Peak	Spacewatch	L4	10 km	MPC · JPL
237026	2008 SY_{42}	—	September 20, 2008	Kitt Peak	Spacewatch	·	2.0 km	MPC · JPL
237027	2008 SH_{62}	—	September 21, 2008	Kitt Peak	Spacewatch	·	1.0 km	MPC · JPL
237028	2008 SP_{65}	—	September 21, 2008	Mount Lemmon	Mount Lemmon Survey	·	2.4 km	MPC · JPL
237029	2008 SL_{67}	—	September 21, 2008	Kitt Peak	Spacewatch	·	1.4 km	MPC · JPL
237030	2008 SB_{68}	—	September 21, 2008	Catalina	CSS	·	2.8 km	MPC · JPL
237031	2008 ST_{71}	—	September 22, 2008	Kitt Peak	Spacewatch	·	1.5 km	MPC · JPL
237032	2008 SZ_{72}	—	September 22, 2008	Mount Lemmon	Mount Lemmon Survey	·	2.6 km	MPC · JPL
237033	2008 SO_{80}	—	September 23, 2008	Catalina	CSS	·	2.1 km	MPC · JPL
237034	2008 SQ_{85}	—	September 19, 2008	Kitt Peak	Spacewatch	·	900 m	MPC · JPL
237035	2008 SL_{91}	—	September 21, 2008	Kitt Peak	Spacewatch	L4 · ERY	12 km	MPC · JPL
237036	2008 SY_{93}	—	September 21, 2008	Kitt Peak	Spacewatch	·	1.1 km	MPC · JPL
237037	2008 SK_{104}	—	September 21, 2008	Kitt Peak	Spacewatch	·	3.7 km	MPC · JPL
237038	2008 SN_{104}	—	September 21, 2008	Kitt Peak	Spacewatch	·	1.9 km	MPC · JPL
237039	2008 SM_{106}	—	September 21, 2008	Kitt Peak	Spacewatch	AST	2.3 km	MPC · JPL
237040	2008 SK_{110}	—	September 22, 2008	Kitt Peak	Spacewatch	·	2.2 km	MPC · JPL
237041	2008 SO_{116}	—	September 22, 2008	Mount Lemmon	Mount Lemmon Survey	·	920 m	MPC · JPL
237042	2008 SK_{117}	—	September 22, 2008	Mount Lemmon	Mount Lemmon Survey	·	2.0 km	MPC · JPL
237043	2008 SM_{117}	—	September 22, 2008	Mount Lemmon	Mount Lemmon Survey	·	850 m	MPC · JPL
237044	2008 SW_{120}	—	September 22, 2008	Mount Lemmon	Mount Lemmon Survey	·	1.2 km	MPC · JPL
237045	2008 SE_{125}	—	September 22, 2008	Mount Lemmon	Mount Lemmon Survey	KOR	1.4 km	MPC · JPL
237046	2008 SV_{125}	—	September 22, 2008	Mount Lemmon	Mount Lemmon Survey	·	1.2 km	MPC · JPL
237047	2008 SA_{126}	—	September 22, 2008	Mount Lemmon	Mount Lemmon Survey	·	2.0 km	MPC · JPL
237048	2008 SF_{126}	—	September 22, 2008	Mount Lemmon	Mount Lemmon Survey	JUN	1.7 km	MPC · JPL
237049	2008 SU_{128}	—	September 22, 2008	Kitt Peak	Spacewatch	·	1.3 km	MPC · JPL
237050	2008 SC_{130}	—	September 22, 2008	Kitt Peak	Spacewatch	·	3.3 km	MPC · JPL
237051	2008 SE_{131}	—	September 22, 2008	Kitt Peak	Spacewatch	·	2.9 km	MPC · JPL
237052	2008 SN_{135}	—	September 23, 2008	Mount Lemmon	Mount Lemmon Survey	·	950 m	MPC · JPL
237053	2008 SD_{149}	—	September 28, 2008	Sandlot	G. Hug	3:2	7.5 km	MPC · JPL
237054	2008 SE_{150}	—	September 29, 2008	Dauban	Kugel, F.	EUN	2.4 km	MPC · JPL
237055	2008 SN_{157}	—	September 24, 2008	Socorro	LINEAR	·	1.3 km	MPC · JPL
237056	2008 SB_{158}	—	September 24, 2008	Socorro	LINEAR	·	2.9 km	MPC · JPL
237057	2008 SW_{159}	—	September 24, 2008	Socorro	LINEAR	·	720 m	MPC · JPL
237058	2008 SR_{162}	—	September 28, 2008	Socorro	LINEAR	·	1.1 km	MPC · JPL
237059	2008 SK_{167}	—	September 28, 2008	Socorro	LINEAR	GEF	1.9 km	MPC · JPL
237060	2008 ST_{181}	—	September 24, 2008	Mount Lemmon	Mount Lemmon Survey	(5)	1.6 km	MPC · JPL
237061	2008 SU_{194}	—	September 25, 2008	Kitt Peak	Spacewatch	slow	2.4 km	MPC · JPL
237062	2008 SA_{195}	—	September 25, 2008	Kitt Peak	Spacewatch	·	2.0 km	MPC · JPL
237063	2008 SX_{197}	—	September 25, 2008	Kitt Peak	Spacewatch	·	2.1 km	MPC · JPL
237064	2008 SA_{202}	—	September 26, 2008	Kitt Peak	Spacewatch	EUN	1.5 km	MPC · JPL
237065	2008 SW_{203}	—	September 26, 2008	Kitt Peak	Spacewatch	·	2.1 km	MPC · JPL
237066	2008 SW_{204}	—	September 26, 2008	Kitt Peak	Spacewatch	·	2.3 km	MPC · JPL
237067	2008 SR_{208}	—	September 27, 2008	Mount Lemmon	Mount Lemmon Survey	·	1.9 km	MPC · JPL
237068	2008 SP_{210}	—	September 28, 2008	Kitt Peak	Spacewatch	V	840 m	MPC · JPL
237069	2008 SA_{225}	—	September 26, 2008	Kitt Peak	Spacewatch	DOR	3.5 km	MPC · JPL
237070	2008 SM_{246}	—	September 30, 2008	La Sagra	OAM	(5)	1.5 km	MPC · JPL
237071	2008 SP_{246}	—	September 30, 2008	La Sagra	OAM	·	980 m	MPC · JPL
237072	2008 SR_{251}	—	September 26, 2008	Kitt Peak	Spacewatch	·	2.6 km	MPC · JPL
237073	2008 SE_{258}	—	September 22, 2008	Kitt Peak	Spacewatch	·	770 m	MPC · JPL
237074	2008 SU_{259}	—	September 23, 2008	Kitt Peak	Spacewatch	·	2.3 km	MPC · JPL
237075	2008 SM_{261}	—	September 23, 2008	Kitt Peak	Spacewatch	·	2.5 km	MPC · JPL
237076	2008 SE_{264}	—	September 24, 2008	Mount Lemmon	Mount Lemmon Survey	·	2.7 km	MPC · JPL
237077	2008 SG_{270}	—	September 24, 2008	Kitt Peak	Spacewatch	·	4.4 km	MPC · JPL
237078	2008 SE_{281}	—	September 27, 2008	Mount Lemmon	Mount Lemmon Survey	·	2.5 km	MPC · JPL
237079	2008 SH_{284}	—	September 24, 2008	Catalina	CSS	HNS	1.8 km	MPC · JPL
237080	2008 SL_{287}	—	September 23, 2008	Goodricke-Pigott	R. A. Tucker	·	2.5 km	MPC · JPL
237081	2008 SM_{290}	—	September 29, 2008	Catalina	CSS	·	1.7 km	MPC · JPL
237082	2008 SB_{298}	—	September 20, 2008	Mount Lemmon	Mount Lemmon Survey	·	930 m	MPC · JPL
237083	2008 SN_{299}	—	September 22, 2008	Kitt Peak	Spacewatch	·	1.7 km	MPC · JPL
237084	2008 SQ_{300}	—	September 23, 2008	Catalina	CSS	·	5.0 km	MPC · JPL
237085	2008 SK_{301}	—	September 23, 2008	Socorro	LINEAR	·	2.3 km	MPC · JPL
237086	2008 SJ_{309}	—	September 22, 2008	Mount Lemmon	Mount Lemmon Survey	·	1.3 km	MPC · JPL
237087	2008 TJ_{1}	—	October 2, 2008	Sandlot	G. Hug	·	1 km	MPC · JPL
237088	2008 TW_{2}	—	October 4, 2008	La Sagra	OAM	·	2.1 km	MPC · JPL
237089	2008 TB_{6}	—	October 3, 2008	La Sagra	OAM	·	770 m	MPC · JPL
237090	2008 TR_{17}	—	October 1, 2008	Mount Lemmon	Mount Lemmon Survey	NEM	2.9 km	MPC · JPL
237091	2008 TO_{18}	—	October 1, 2008	Mount Lemmon	Mount Lemmon Survey	·	2.5 km	MPC · JPL
237092	2008 TQ_{21}	—	October 1, 2008	Mount Lemmon	Mount Lemmon Survey	·	2.3 km	MPC · JPL
237093	2008 TL_{24}	—	October 2, 2008	Catalina	CSS	·	1.8 km	MPC · JPL
237094	2008 TA_{26}	—	October 8, 2008	Kachina	Hobart, J.	·	890 m	MPC · JPL
237095	2008 TF_{26}	—	October 1, 2008	Catalina	CSS	·	2.9 km	MPC · JPL
237096	2008 TJ_{44}	—	October 1, 2008	Mount Lemmon	Mount Lemmon Survey	·	1.8 km	MPC · JPL
237097	2008 TE_{45}	—	October 1, 2008	Mount Lemmon	Mount Lemmon Survey	PAD	2.5 km	MPC · JPL
237098	2008 TK_{46}	—	October 1, 2008	Kitt Peak	Spacewatch	·	6.1 km	MPC · JPL
237099	2008 TM_{56}	—	October 2, 2008	Kitt Peak	Spacewatch	·	2.2 km	MPC · JPL
237100	2008 TE_{73}	—	October 2, 2008	Kitt Peak	Spacewatch	EUN	2.0 km	MPC · JPL

== 237101–237200 ==
back to top

Designation			Discovery			Properties		Ref
Permanent	Provisional	Named after	Date	Site	Discoverer(s)	Category	Diam.	Ref
237101	2008 TN_{81}	—	October 2, 2008	Mount Lemmon	Mount Lemmon Survey	·	1.2 km	MPC · JPL
237102	2008 TH_{85}	—	October 3, 2008	Mount Lemmon	Mount Lemmon Survey	·	4.1 km	MPC · JPL
237103	2008 TJ_{92}	—	October 4, 2008	La Sagra	OAM	·	1.4 km	MPC · JPL
237104	2008 TX_{98}	—	October 6, 2008	Kitt Peak	Spacewatch	·	1.5 km	MPC · JPL
237105	2008 TL_{101}	—	October 6, 2008	Kitt Peak	Spacewatch	·	1.4 km	MPC · JPL
237106	2008 TX_{102}	—	October 6, 2008	Kitt Peak	Spacewatch	·	960 m	MPC · JPL
237107	2008 TU_{103}	—	October 6, 2008	Kitt Peak	Spacewatch	·	660 m	MPC · JPL
237108	2008 TY_{103}	—	October 6, 2008	Kitt Peak	Spacewatch	·	1.3 km	MPC · JPL
237109	2008 TX_{120}	—	October 7, 2008	Mount Lemmon	Mount Lemmon Survey	MRX	1.7 km	MPC · JPL
237110	2008 TR_{123}	—	October 8, 2008	Mount Lemmon	Mount Lemmon Survey	·	2.9 km	MPC · JPL
237111	2008 TO_{127}	—	October 8, 2008	Mount Lemmon	Mount Lemmon Survey	V	730 m	MPC · JPL
237112	2008 TB_{133}	—	October 8, 2008	Mount Lemmon	Mount Lemmon Survey	·	3.2 km	MPC · JPL
237113	2008 TM_{154}	—	October 9, 2008	Mount Lemmon	Mount Lemmon Survey	PHO	1.2 km	MPC · JPL
237114	2008 TY_{157}	—	October 4, 2008	La Sagra	OAM	·	2.3 km	MPC · JPL
237115	2008 TB_{164}	—	October 1, 2008	Catalina	CSS	·	2.6 km	MPC · JPL
237116	2008 TR_{164}	—	October 1, 2008	Kitt Peak	Spacewatch	·	2.3 km	MPC · JPL
237117	2008 TV_{170}	—	October 9, 2008	Mount Lemmon	Mount Lemmon Survey	·	2.2 km	MPC · JPL
237118	2008 TE_{172}	—	October 9, 2008	Catalina	CSS	·	3.2 km	MPC · JPL
237119	2008 TN_{177}	—	October 9, 2008	Catalina	CSS	·	3.8 km	MPC · JPL
237120	2008 TC_{178}	—	October 9, 2008	Catalina	CSS	HNS	1.7 km	MPC · JPL
237121	2008 TH_{186}	—	October 7, 2008	Mount Lemmon	Mount Lemmon Survey	·	2.2 km	MPC · JPL
237122	2008 TJ_{186}	—	October 7, 2008	Mount Lemmon	Mount Lemmon Survey	·	2.4 km	MPC · JPL
237123	2008 TG_{189}	—	October 10, 2008	Mount Lemmon	Mount Lemmon Survey	V	940 m	MPC · JPL
237124	2008 TC_{190}	—	October 6, 2008	Mount Lemmon	Mount Lemmon Survey	·	3.5 km	MPC · JPL
237125	2008 UA_{2}	—	October 21, 2008	Sierra Stars	Tozzi, F.	·	2.8 km	MPC · JPL
237126	2008 UE_{4}	—	October 24, 2008	Socorro	LINEAR	·	2.0 km	MPC · JPL
237127	2008 UH_{4}	—	October 24, 2008	Socorro	LINEAR	·	3.3 km	MPC · JPL
237128	2008 UG_{5}	—	October 24, 2008	Socorro	LINEAR	·	6.3 km	MPC · JPL
237129	2008 UD_{6}	—	October 20, 2008	Kitt Peak	Spacewatch	·	2.6 km	MPC · JPL
237130	2008 UZ_{8}	—	October 17, 2008	Kitt Peak	Spacewatch	·	750 m	MPC · JPL
237131	2008 UY_{15}	—	October 18, 2008	Kitt Peak	Spacewatch	·	810 m	MPC · JPL
237132	2008 UQ_{26}	—	October 20, 2008	Kitt Peak	Spacewatch	KOR	1.4 km	MPC · JPL
237133	2008 UG_{27}	—	October 20, 2008	Kitt Peak	Spacewatch	·	870 m	MPC · JPL
237134	2008 US_{27}	—	October 20, 2008	Kitt Peak	Spacewatch	·	1.8 km	MPC · JPL
237135	2008 UP_{28}	—	October 20, 2008	Kitt Peak	Spacewatch	·	2.3 km	MPC · JPL
237136	2008 UD_{30}	—	October 20, 2008	Kitt Peak	Spacewatch	·	3.2 km	MPC · JPL
237137	2008 UX_{30}	—	October 20, 2008	Kitt Peak	Spacewatch	·	2.3 km	MPC · JPL
237138	2008 UT_{41}	—	October 20, 2008	Kitt Peak	Spacewatch	·	1.7 km	MPC · JPL
237139	2008 UM_{56}	—	October 21, 2008	Kitt Peak	Spacewatch	·	1.7 km	MPC · JPL
237140	2008 UY_{60}	—	October 21, 2008	Kitt Peak	Spacewatch	V	920 m	MPC · JPL
237141	2008 UV_{61}	—	October 21, 2008	Kitt Peak	Spacewatch	·	2.1 km	MPC · JPL
237142	2008 UU_{62}	—	October 21, 2008	Kitt Peak	Spacewatch	·	2.7 km	MPC · JPL
237143	2008 UU_{66}	—	October 21, 2008	Kitt Peak	Spacewatch	·	1.5 km	MPC · JPL
237144	2008 UN_{67}	—	October 21, 2008	Kitt Peak	Spacewatch	·	2.1 km	MPC · JPL
237145	2008 UF_{72}	—	October 21, 2008	Mount Lemmon	Mount Lemmon Survey	·	4.0 km	MPC · JPL
237146	2008 US_{72}	—	October 21, 2008	Mount Lemmon	Mount Lemmon Survey	·	2.4 km	MPC · JPL
237147	2008 UT_{73}	—	October 21, 2008	Kitt Peak	Spacewatch	·	1.7 km	MPC · JPL
237148	2008 UX_{73}	—	October 21, 2008	Kitt Peak	Spacewatch	·	3.5 km	MPC · JPL
237149	2008 UH_{77}	—	October 21, 2008	Mount Lemmon	Mount Lemmon Survey	·	5.8 km	MPC · JPL
237150	2008 UB_{86}	—	October 23, 2008	Mount Lemmon	Mount Lemmon Survey	·	2.2 km	MPC · JPL
237151	2008 UE_{91}	—	October 25, 2008	Dauban	Kugel, F.	·	1.6 km	MPC · JPL
237152	2008 UQ_{93}	—	October 25, 2008	Socorro	LINEAR	(5)	1.7 km	MPC · JPL
237153	2008 UV_{95}	—	October 23, 2008	Socorro	LINEAR	·	3.0 km	MPC · JPL
237154	2008 UR_{96}	—	October 24, 2008	Socorro	LINEAR	EUN	1.9 km	MPC · JPL
237155	2008 UG_{98}	—	October 26, 2008	Socorro	LINEAR	WIT	1.7 km	MPC · JPL
237156	2008 UD_{99}	—	October 29, 2008	Socorro	LINEAR	·	2.5 km	MPC · JPL
237157	2008 UJ_{103}	—	October 20, 2008	Kitt Peak	Spacewatch	·	7.3 km	MPC · JPL
237158	2008 UO_{105}	—	October 20, 2008	Kitt Peak	Spacewatch	THM	2.8 km	MPC · JPL
237159	2008 UO_{112}	—	October 22, 2008	Kitt Peak	Spacewatch	·	1.6 km	MPC · JPL
237160	2008 UP_{114}	—	October 22, 2008	Kitt Peak	Spacewatch	·	1.5 km	MPC · JPL
237161	2008 UD_{119}	—	October 22, 2008	Kitt Peak	Spacewatch	EOS	2.7 km	MPC · JPL
237162	2008 US_{125}	—	October 22, 2008	Kitt Peak	Spacewatch	·	2.1 km	MPC · JPL
237163	2008 US_{126}	—	October 22, 2008	Kitt Peak	Spacewatch	·	3.2 km	MPC · JPL
237164 Keelung	2008 UP_{128}	Keelung	October 22, 2008	Lulin	Hsiao, X. Y., Q. Ye	·	1.1 km	MPC · JPL
237165	2008 UK_{129}	—	October 23, 2008	Kitt Peak	Spacewatch	·	2.0 km	MPC · JPL
237166	2008 UH_{137}	—	October 23, 2008	Kitt Peak	Spacewatch	·	1.6 km	MPC · JPL
237167	2008 UK_{138}	—	October 23, 2008	Kitt Peak	Spacewatch	·	2.8 km	MPC · JPL
237168	2008 UV_{140}	—	October 23, 2008	Kitt Peak	Spacewatch	THM	2.8 km	MPC · JPL
237169	2008 UZ_{146}	—	October 23, 2008	Kitt Peak	Spacewatch	KOR	1.5 km	MPC · JPL
237170	2008 UP_{148}	—	October 23, 2008	Kitt Peak	Spacewatch	HYG	3.6 km	MPC · JPL
237171	2008 UW_{148}	—	October 23, 2008	Kitt Peak	Spacewatch	·	2.2 km	MPC · JPL
237172	2008 UN_{150}	—	October 23, 2008	Mount Lemmon	Mount Lemmon Survey	AGN	1.1 km	MPC · JPL
237173	2008 UT_{152}	—	October 23, 2008	Mount Lemmon	Mount Lemmon Survey	·	1.9 km	MPC · JPL
237174	2008 UB_{155}	—	October 23, 2008	Mount Lemmon	Mount Lemmon Survey	AGN	1.4 km	MPC · JPL
237175	2008 UZ_{155}	—	October 23, 2008	Kitt Peak	Spacewatch	·	2.0 km	MPC · JPL
237176	2008 UX_{160}	—	October 23, 2008	Črni Vrh	Mikuž, B.	·	2.9 km	MPC · JPL
237177	2008 UZ_{160}	—	October 24, 2008	Bergisch Gladbach	W. Bickel	·	1.9 km	MPC · JPL
237178	2008 UJ_{174}	—	October 24, 2008	Kitt Peak	Spacewatch	·	4.3 km	MPC · JPL
237179	2008 UB_{180}	—	October 24, 2008	Kitt Peak	Spacewatch	(5)	1.9 km	MPC · JPL
237180	2008 UT_{184}	—	October 24, 2008	Kitt Peak	Spacewatch	·	1.8 km	MPC · JPL
237181	2008 UX_{184}	—	October 24, 2008	Kitt Peak	Spacewatch	·	1.2 km	MPC · JPL
237182	2008 UZ_{194}	—	October 26, 2008	Kitt Peak	Spacewatch	·	2.4 km	MPC · JPL
237183	2008 UG_{195}	—	October 26, 2008	Kitt Peak	Spacewatch	·	2.0 km	MPC · JPL
237184	2008 UM_{198}	—	October 26, 2008	Socorro	LINEAR	·	2.0 km	MPC · JPL
237185	2008 UZ_{200}	—	October 27, 2008	Socorro	LINEAR	·	1.1 km	MPC · JPL
237186	2008 UE_{209}	—	October 23, 2008	Kitt Peak	Spacewatch	·	1.9 km	MPC · JPL
237187 Zhonglihe	2008 UA_{212}	Zhonglihe	October 23, 2008	Lulin	Hsiao, X. Y., Q. Ye	·	2.6 km	MPC · JPL
237188	2008 UE_{220}	—	October 25, 2008	Kitt Peak	Spacewatch	(5)	1.7 km	MPC · JPL
237189	2008 UY_{220}	—	October 25, 2008	Kitt Peak	Spacewatch	·	2.9 km	MPC · JPL
237190	2008 UU_{223}	—	October 25, 2008	Catalina	CSS	KOR	1.9 km	MPC · JPL
237191	2008 UP_{241}	—	October 26, 2008	Catalina	CSS	·	3.0 km	MPC · JPL
237192	2008 UA_{242}	—	October 26, 2008	Catalina	CSS	·	1.6 km	MPC · JPL
237193	2008 UX_{247}	—	October 26, 2008	Kitt Peak	Spacewatch	·	1.5 km	MPC · JPL
237194	2008 UM_{250}	—	October 27, 2008	Kitt Peak	Spacewatch	KOR	1.6 km	MPC · JPL
237195	2008 UK_{252}	—	October 27, 2008	Kitt Peak	Spacewatch	·	770 m	MPC · JPL
237196	2008 UR_{253}	—	October 27, 2008	Kitt Peak	Spacewatch	·	2.3 km	MPC · JPL
237197	2008 UV_{256}	—	October 27, 2008	Kitt Peak	Spacewatch	·	4.2 km	MPC · JPL
237198	2008 UH_{258}	—	October 27, 2008	Kitt Peak	Spacewatch	KOR	1.7 km	MPC · JPL
237199	2008 UG_{263}	—	October 27, 2008	Kitt Peak	Spacewatch	·	2.5 km	MPC · JPL
237200	2008 US_{265}	—	October 28, 2008	Kitt Peak	Spacewatch	·	1.9 km	MPC · JPL

== 237201–237300 ==
back to top

Designation			Discovery			Properties		Ref
Permanent	Provisional	Named after	Date	Site	Discoverer(s)	Category	Diam.	Ref
237201	2008 UP_{269}	—	October 28, 2008	Kitt Peak	Spacewatch	MAS	840 m	MPC · JPL
237202	2008 UP_{275}	—	October 28, 2008	Mount Lemmon	Mount Lemmon Survey	·	2.7 km	MPC · JPL
237203	2008 UA_{277}	—	October 28, 2008	Mount Lemmon	Mount Lemmon Survey	·	3.3 km	MPC · JPL
237204	2008 UT_{277}	—	October 28, 2008	Mount Lemmon	Mount Lemmon Survey	·	1.6 km	MPC · JPL
237205	2008 UC_{280}	—	October 28, 2008	Kitt Peak	Spacewatch	·	990 m	MPC · JPL
237206	2008 UM_{281}	—	October 28, 2008	Kitt Peak	Spacewatch	·	3.7 km	MPC · JPL
237207	2008 UP_{282}	—	October 28, 2008	Kitt Peak	Spacewatch	·	1.7 km	MPC · JPL
237208	2008 UK_{290}	—	October 28, 2008	Kitt Peak	Spacewatch	·	2.1 km	MPC · JPL
237209	2008 UX_{298}	—	October 29, 2008	Kitt Peak	Spacewatch	·	1.9 km	MPC · JPL
237210	2008 UJ_{309}	—	October 30, 2008	Catalina	CSS	·	2.2 km	MPC · JPL
237211	2008 UV_{315}	—	October 30, 2008	Kitt Peak	Spacewatch	·	1.7 km	MPC · JPL
237212	2008 US_{324}	—	October 31, 2008	Kitt Peak	Spacewatch	·	2.3 km	MPC · JPL
237213	2008 UR_{329}	—	October 31, 2008	Kitt Peak	Spacewatch	·	1.5 km	MPC · JPL
237214	2008 UF_{337}	—	October 20, 2008	Kitt Peak	Spacewatch	MAS	900 m	MPC · JPL
237215	2008 UJ_{337}	—	October 21, 2008	Kitt Peak	Spacewatch	·	2.3 km	MPC · JPL
237216	2008 UG_{340}	—	October 23, 2008	Mount Lemmon	Mount Lemmon Survey	·	1.8 km	MPC · JPL
237217	2008 UC_{348}	—	October 23, 2008	Mount Lemmon	Mount Lemmon Survey	THM	2.4 km	MPC · JPL
237218	2008 UD_{353}	—	October 28, 2008	Kitt Peak	Spacewatch	·	3.9 km	MPC · JPL
237219	2008 UN_{353}	—	October 28, 2008	Kitt Peak	Spacewatch	·	2.4 km	MPC · JPL
237220	2008 UR_{356}	—	October 23, 2008	Mount Lemmon	Mount Lemmon Survey	·	2.2 km	MPC · JPL
237221	2008 VS_{2}	—	November 2, 2008	Socorro	LINEAR	·	4.2 km	MPC · JPL
237222	2008 VK_{15}	—	November 1, 2008	Kitt Peak	Spacewatch	MAS	1.0 km	MPC · JPL
237223	2008 VO_{23}	—	November 1, 2008	Kitt Peak	Spacewatch	·	2.3 km	MPC · JPL
237224	2008 VY_{37}	—	November 2, 2008	Mount Lemmon	Mount Lemmon Survey	·	2.1 km	MPC · JPL
237225	2008 VD_{39}	—	November 2, 2008	Kitt Peak	Spacewatch	KOR	1.4 km	MPC · JPL
237226	2008 VM_{51}	—	November 4, 2008	Kitt Peak	Spacewatch	RAF	1.8 km	MPC · JPL
237227	2008 VE_{53}	—	November 6, 2008	Mount Lemmon	Mount Lemmon Survey	MRX	1.6 km	MPC · JPL
237228	2008 VU_{59}	—	November 7, 2008	Catalina	CSS	·	1.8 km	MPC · JPL
237229	2008 VR_{64}	—	November 10, 2008	La Sagra	OAM	HYG	3.3 km	MPC · JPL
237230	2008 VS_{64}	—	November 6, 2008	Mount Lemmon	Mount Lemmon Survey	JUN	1.7 km	MPC · JPL
237231	2008 VN_{66}	—	November 2, 2008	Catalina	CSS	·	4.1 km	MPC · JPL
237232	2008 VQ_{68}	—	November 8, 2008	Mount Lemmon	Mount Lemmon Survey	·	3.4 km	MPC · JPL
237233	2008 VX_{71}	—	November 7, 2008	Mount Lemmon	Mount Lemmon Survey	·	3.0 km	MPC · JPL
237234	2008 VG_{73}	—	November 2, 2008	Catalina	CSS	·	3.9 km	MPC · JPL
237235	2008 VP_{76}	—	November 1, 2008	Mount Lemmon	Mount Lemmon Survey	·	2.9 km	MPC · JPL
237236	2008 WV_{5}	—	November 17, 2008	Kitt Peak	Spacewatch	KOR	1.9 km	MPC · JPL
237237	2008 WE_{12}	—	November 18, 2008	Catalina	CSS	KOR	2.0 km	MPC · JPL
237238	2008 WY_{21}	—	November 18, 2008	La Sagra	OAM	·	2.5 km	MPC · JPL
237239	2008 WN_{32}	—	November 20, 2008	Bisei SG Center	BATTeRS	·	1.6 km	MPC · JPL
237240	2008 WM_{35}	—	November 17, 2008	Kitt Peak	Spacewatch	·	2.6 km	MPC · JPL
237241	2008 WP_{35}	—	November 17, 2008	Kitt Peak	Spacewatch	AGN	1.4 km	MPC · JPL
237242	2008 WM_{36}	—	November 17, 2008	Kitt Peak	Spacewatch	AGN	1.1 km	MPC · JPL
237243	2008 WN_{36}	—	November 17, 2008	Kitt Peak	Spacewatch	KOR	1.6 km	MPC · JPL
237244	2008 WX_{44}	—	November 17, 2008	Kitt Peak	Spacewatch	·	2.0 km	MPC · JPL
237245	2008 WF_{48}	—	November 17, 2008	Kitt Peak	Spacewatch	·	2.7 km	MPC · JPL
237246	2008 WX_{54}	—	November 19, 2008	Catalina	CSS	·	2.4 km	MPC · JPL
237247	2008 WP_{62}	—	November 21, 2008	Mount Lemmon	Mount Lemmon Survey	·	1.9 km	MPC · JPL
237248	2008 WK_{66}	—	November 18, 2008	Kitt Peak	Spacewatch	THM	2.3 km	MPC · JPL
237249	2008 WD_{69}	—	November 18, 2008	Kitt Peak	Spacewatch	KOR	1.8 km	MPC · JPL
237250	2008 WG_{69}	—	November 18, 2008	Catalina	CSS	·	1.6 km	MPC · JPL
237251	2008 WY_{69}	—	November 18, 2008	Kitt Peak	Spacewatch	·	3.7 km	MPC · JPL
237252	2008 WB_{70}	—	November 18, 2008	Kitt Peak	Spacewatch	THM	3.8 km	MPC · JPL
237253	2008 WA_{72}	—	November 19, 2008	Kitt Peak	Spacewatch	T_{j} (2.99) · 3:2	5.3 km	MPC · JPL
237254	2008 WU_{75}	—	November 20, 2008	Kitt Peak	Spacewatch	·	1.6 km	MPC · JPL
237255	2008 WA_{77}	—	November 20, 2008	Kitt Peak	Spacewatch	3:2 · SHU	5.5 km	MPC · JPL
237256	2008 WZ_{78}	—	November 20, 2008	Kitt Peak	Spacewatch	·	2.0 km	MPC · JPL
237257	2008 WW_{79}	—	November 20, 2008	Kitt Peak	Spacewatch	·	2.6 km	MPC · JPL
237258	2008 WU_{80}	—	November 20, 2008	Kitt Peak	Spacewatch	·	2.1 km	MPC · JPL
237259	2008 WA_{83}	—	November 20, 2008	Kitt Peak	Spacewatch	AGN	1.7 km	MPC · JPL
237260	2008 WE_{92}	—	November 24, 2008	Dauban	Kugel, F.	·	2.7 km	MPC · JPL
237261	2008 WN_{94}	—	November 28, 2008	Pla D'Arguines	R. Ferrando	·	2.3 km	MPC · JPL
237262	2008 WP_{95}	—	November 23, 2008	Socorro	LINEAR	·	2.2 km	MPC · JPL
237263	2008 WY_{95}	—	November 23, 2008	Socorro	LINEAR	AGN	1.9 km	MPC · JPL
237264	2008 WP_{96}	—	November 28, 2008	Piszkéstető	K. Sárneczky, Karpati, A.	·	3.2 km	MPC · JPL
237265 Golobokov	2008 WQ_{96}	Golobokov	November 28, 2008	Zelenchukskaya Stn	T. V. Krjačko	·	2.1 km	MPC · JPL
237266	2008 WX_{96}	—	November 30, 2008	Mayhill	Lowe, A.	·	2.4 km	MPC · JPL
237267	2008 WQ_{101}	—	November 30, 2008	Socorro	LINEAR	(5)	1.6 km	MPC · JPL
237268	2008 WM_{102}	—	November 19, 2008	Catalina	CSS	·	2.0 km	MPC · JPL
237269	2008 WR_{105}	—	November 30, 2008	Mount Lemmon	Mount Lemmon Survey	·	1.4 km	MPC · JPL
237270	2008 WP_{109}	—	November 30, 2008	Kitt Peak	Spacewatch	·	2.4 km	MPC · JPL
237271	2008 WM_{115}	—	November 30, 2008	Kitt Peak	Spacewatch	·	2.2 km	MPC · JPL
237272	2008 WA_{129}	—	November 19, 2008	Kitt Peak	Spacewatch	DOR	3.8 km	MPC · JPL
237273	2008 WV_{130}	—	November 18, 2008	Kitt Peak	Spacewatch	AGN	1.4 km	MPC · JPL
237274	2008 WY_{134}	—	November 30, 2008	Catalina	CSS	·	5.6 km	MPC · JPL
237275	2008 WG_{135}	—	November 18, 2008	Socorro	LINEAR	·	2.6 km	MPC · JPL
237276 Nakama	2008 XD_{2}	Nakama	December 2, 2008	Geisei	T. Seki	·	4.1 km	MPC · JPL
237277 Nevaruth	2008 XR_{2}	Nevaruth	December 5, 2008	Tooele	P. Wiggins	·	3.0 km	MPC · JPL
237278	2008 XG_{5}	—	December 3, 2008	Socorro	LINEAR	T_{j} (2.99) · HIL · 3:2	6.8 km	MPC · JPL
237279	2008 XB_{7}	—	December 7, 2008	San Marcello	San Marcello	·	3.0 km	MPC · JPL
237280	2008 XK_{10}	—	December 1, 2008	Kitt Peak	Spacewatch	·	4.7 km	MPC · JPL
237281	2008 XF_{13}	—	December 2, 2008	Mount Lemmon	Mount Lemmon Survey	·	2.0 km	MPC · JPL
237282	2008 XW_{15}	—	December 3, 2008	Mount Lemmon	Mount Lemmon Survey	CYB	4.3 km	MPC · JPL
237283	2008 XK_{16}	—	December 1, 2008	Kitt Peak	Spacewatch	·	1.9 km	MPC · JPL
237284	2008 XR_{16}	—	December 1, 2008	Kitt Peak	Spacewatch	·	3.2 km	MPC · JPL
237285	2008 XT_{17}	—	December 1, 2008	Kitt Peak	Spacewatch	KOR	1.8 km	MPC · JPL
237286	2008 XB_{21}	—	December 1, 2008	Kitt Peak	Spacewatch	EOS	3.1 km	MPC · JPL
237287	2008 XK_{34}	—	December 2, 2008	Kitt Peak	Spacewatch	·	2.0 km	MPC · JPL
237288	2008 XT_{36}	—	December 2, 2008	Kitt Peak	Spacewatch	·	1.9 km	MPC · JPL
237289	2008 XN_{37}	—	December 2, 2008	Kitt Peak	Spacewatch	·	2.1 km	MPC · JPL
237290	2008 XG_{39}	—	December 2, 2008	Kitt Peak	Spacewatch	·	2.2 km	MPC · JPL
237291	2008 XS_{47}	—	December 4, 2008	Mount Lemmon	Mount Lemmon Survey	·	1.4 km	MPC · JPL
237292	2008 XX_{47}	—	December 4, 2008	Mount Lemmon	Mount Lemmon Survey	·	5.3 km	MPC · JPL
237293	2008 XA_{48}	—	December 4, 2008	Mount Lemmon	Mount Lemmon Survey	·	1.9 km	MPC · JPL
237294	2008 YE_{5}	—	December 19, 2008	La Sagra	OAM	·	4.2 km	MPC · JPL
237295	2008 YN_{7}	—	December 20, 2008	La Sagra	OAM	CLA	3.1 km	MPC · JPL
237296	2008 YW_{18}	—	December 21, 2008	Mount Lemmon	Mount Lemmon Survey	HYG	3.8 km	MPC · JPL
237297	2008 YW_{27}	—	December 28, 2008	Taunus	Karge, S., R. Kling	THM	3.6 km	MPC · JPL
237298	2008 YM_{29}	—	December 27, 2008	Bisei SG Center	BATTeRS	·	4.1 km	MPC · JPL
237299	2008 YR_{33}	—	December 31, 2008	Altschwendt	W. Ries	EOS	3.2 km	MPC · JPL
237300	2008 YA_{34}	—	December 27, 2008	Bergisch Gladbach	W. Bickel	·	4.4 km	MPC · JPL

== 237301–237400 ==
back to top

Designation			Discovery			Properties		Ref
Permanent	Provisional	Named after	Date	Site	Discoverer(s)	Category	Diam.	Ref
237301	2008 YZ_{43}	—	December 29, 2008	Kitt Peak	Spacewatch	·	3.2 km	MPC · JPL
237302	2008 YA_{59}	—	December 30, 2008	Kitt Peak	Spacewatch	·	3.6 km	MPC · JPL
237303	2008 YV_{59}	—	December 30, 2008	Kitt Peak	Spacewatch	·	4.0 km	MPC · JPL
237304	2008 YP_{77}	—	December 30, 2008	Mount Lemmon	Mount Lemmon Survey	·	3.1 km	MPC · JPL
237305	2008 YT_{88}	—	December 29, 2008	Kitt Peak	Spacewatch	KOR	1.6 km	MPC · JPL
237306	2008 YH_{89}	—	December 29, 2008	Kitt Peak	Spacewatch	·	4.0 km	MPC · JPL
237307	2008 YQ_{90}	—	December 29, 2008	Kitt Peak	Spacewatch	·	2.8 km	MPC · JPL
237308	2008 YZ_{90}	—	December 29, 2008	Kitt Peak	Spacewatch	·	2.0 km	MPC · JPL
237309	2008 YT_{99}	—	December 29, 2008	Kitt Peak	Spacewatch	·	1.8 km	MPC · JPL
237310	2008 YJ_{110}	—	December 30, 2008	Mount Lemmon	Mount Lemmon Survey	HIL · 3:2	9.0 km	MPC · JPL
237311	2008 YV_{121}	—	December 30, 2008	Kitt Peak	Spacewatch	·	2.4 km	MPC · JPL
237312	2008 YT_{133}	—	December 30, 2008	Kitt Peak	Spacewatch	·	2.6 km	MPC · JPL
237313	2008 YE_{161}	—	December 29, 2008	Mount Lemmon	Mount Lemmon Survey	·	2.0 km	MPC · JPL
237314	2008 YP_{162}	—	December 22, 2008	Kitt Peak	Spacewatch	·	5.1 km	MPC · JPL
237315	2009 AZ_{14}	—	January 2, 2009	Mount Lemmon	Mount Lemmon Survey	·	2.6 km	MPC · JPL
237316	2009 AK_{30}	—	January 15, 2009	Kitt Peak	Spacewatch	·	5.4 km	MPC · JPL
237317	2009 AH_{34}	—	January 15, 2009	Kitt Peak	Spacewatch	MAS	1.2 km	MPC · JPL
237318	2009 AZ_{42}	—	January 3, 2009	Mount Lemmon	Mount Lemmon Survey	·	3.4 km	MPC · JPL
237319	2009 BT_{17}	—	January 16, 2009	Mount Lemmon	Mount Lemmon Survey	V	990 m	MPC · JPL
237320	2009 BX_{36}	—	January 16, 2009	Mount Lemmon	Mount Lemmon Survey	·	4.2 km	MPC · JPL
237321	2009 BM_{54}	—	January 16, 2009	Mount Lemmon	Mount Lemmon Survey	3:2	9.5 km	MPC · JPL
237322	2009 BV_{85}	—	January 25, 2009	Kitt Peak	Spacewatch	·	3.1 km	MPC · JPL
237323	2009 BP_{88}	—	January 25, 2009	Kitt Peak	Spacewatch	3:2	5.9 km	MPC · JPL
237324	2009 BM_{97}	—	January 25, 2009	Catalina	CSS	·	3.9 km	MPC · JPL
237325	2009 BO_{115}	—	January 29, 2009	Kitt Peak	Spacewatch	·	3.4 km	MPC · JPL
237326	2009 BF_{161}	—	January 31, 2009	Mount Lemmon	Mount Lemmon Survey	HYG	3.4 km	MPC · JPL
237327	2009 BE_{172}	—	January 18, 2009	Kitt Peak	Spacewatch	·	3.2 km	MPC · JPL
237328	2009 CA_{1}	—	February 1, 2009	Socorro	LINEAR	·	3.7 km	MPC · JPL
237329	2009 CA_{4}	—	February 4, 2009	Wildberg	R. Apitzsch	·	6.0 km	MPC · JPL
237330	2009 CT_{48}	—	February 14, 2009	Mount Lemmon	Mount Lemmon Survey	THM	3.7 km	MPC · JPL
237331	2009 FB_{24}	—	March 19, 2009	La Sagra	OAM	EUP	4.9 km	MPC · JPL
237332	2009 UN_{87}	—	October 24, 2009	Catalina	CSS	L4	10 km	MPC · JPL
237333	2009 UN_{130}	—	October 24, 2009	Catalina	CSS	KON	4.8 km	MPC · JPL
237334	2009 UG_{153}	—	October 26, 2009	Kitt Peak	Spacewatch	·	4.4 km	MPC · JPL
237335	2009 VZ_{7}	—	November 8, 2009	Catalina	CSS	·	2.8 km	MPC · JPL
237336	2009 WC_{25}	—	November 21, 2009	Mayhill	Mayhill	·	4.6 km	MPC · JPL
237337	2009 WK_{60}	—	November 16, 2009	Kitt Peak	Spacewatch	·	2.8 km	MPC · JPL
237338	2009 WS_{60}	—	November 16, 2009	Mount Lemmon	Mount Lemmon Survey	L4	14 km	MPC · JPL
237339	2009 WN_{162}	—	November 21, 2009	Kitt Peak	Spacewatch	HOF	4.4 km	MPC · JPL
237340	2009 WK_{258}	—	November 27, 2009	Mount Lemmon	Mount Lemmon Survey	AST	2.6 km	MPC · JPL
237341	2009 WD_{263}	—	November 25, 2009	Kitt Peak	Spacewatch	EOS ·	5.9 km	MPC · JPL
237342	2009 XM_{23}	—	December 10, 2009	Socorro	LINEAR	·	2.0 km	MPC · JPL
237343	2009 YJ_{15}	—	December 18, 2009	Kitt Peak	Spacewatch	HNS	1.7 km	MPC · JPL
237344	2010 AY_{23}	—	January 6, 2010	Kitt Peak	Spacewatch	(883)	1.4 km	MPC · JPL
237345	2010 AM_{37}	—	January 7, 2010	Kitt Peak	Spacewatch	·	2.5 km	MPC · JPL
237346	2010 AV_{38}	—	January 8, 2010	Kitt Peak	Spacewatch	·	1.1 km	MPC · JPL
237347	2010 AK_{76}	—	January 15, 2010	Socorro	LINEAR	·	2.6 km	MPC · JPL
237348	2010 AV_{79}	—	January 15, 2010	Kitt Peak	Spacewatch	·	1.8 km	MPC · JPL
237349	2010 CM_{12}	—	February 12, 2010	Mayhill	Mayhill	·	2.4 km	MPC · JPL
237350	2010 CZ_{146}	—	February 13, 2010	Kitt Peak	Spacewatch	·	1.6 km	MPC · JPL
237351	2235 P-L	—	September 24, 1960	Palomar	C. J. van Houten, I. van Houten-Groeneveld, T. Gehrels	·	1.2 km	MPC · JPL
237352	4307 P-L	—	September 24, 1960	Palomar	C. J. van Houten, I. van Houten-Groeneveld, T. Gehrels	·	1.9 km	MPC · JPL
237353	1207 T-2	—	September 29, 1973	Palomar	C. J. van Houten, I. van Houten-Groeneveld, T. Gehrels	·	1.2 km	MPC · JPL
237354	1711 T-2	—	September 29, 1973	Palomar	C. J. van Houten, I. van Houten-Groeneveld, T. Gehrels	·	2.0 km	MPC · JPL
237355	2296 T-2	—	September 29, 1973	Palomar	C. J. van Houten, I. van Houten-Groeneveld, T. Gehrels	NYS	1.9 km	MPC · JPL
237356	3103 T-2	—	September 30, 1973	Palomar	C. J. van Houten, I. van Houten-Groeneveld, T. Gehrels	·	4.4 km	MPC · JPL
237357	2059 T-3	—	October 16, 1977	Palomar	C. J. van Houten, I. van Houten-Groeneveld, T. Gehrels	·	2.3 km	MPC · JPL
237358	3206 T-3	—	October 16, 1977	Palomar	C. J. van Houten, I. van Houten-Groeneveld, T. Gehrels	·	900 m	MPC · JPL
237359	3774 T-3	—	October 16, 1977	Palomar	C. J. van Houten, I. van Houten-Groeneveld, T. Gehrels	·	2.0 km	MPC · JPL
237360	4539 T-3	—	October 16, 1977	Palomar	C. J. van Houten, I. van Houten-Groeneveld, T. Gehrels	(5)	2.8 km	MPC · JPL
237361	1981 EE_{48}	—	March 6, 1981	Siding Spring	S. J. Bus	·	2.8 km	MPC · JPL
237362	1993 FY_{31}	—	March 19, 1993	La Silla	UESAC	·	1.8 km	MPC · JPL
237363	1993 HV_{4}	—	April 22, 1993	Kitt Peak	Spacewatch	VER	4.6 km	MPC · JPL
237364	1993 TW_{22}	—	October 9, 1993	La Silla	E. W. Elst	·	2.8 km	MPC · JPL
237365	1994 EA_{5}	—	March 6, 1994	Kitt Peak	Spacewatch	·	3.8 km	MPC · JPL
237366	1994 PJ_{14}	—	August 10, 1994	La Silla	E. W. Elst	·	1.4 km	MPC · JPL
237367	1994 PY_{35}	—	August 10, 1994	La Silla	E. W. Elst	DOR	4.3 km	MPC · JPL
237368	1994 UA_{7}	—	October 28, 1994	Kitt Peak	Spacewatch	·	1.9 km	MPC · JPL
237369	1994 WG_{7}	—	November 28, 1994	Kitt Peak	Spacewatch	·	2.3 km	MPC · JPL
237370	1994 WN_{8}	—	November 28, 1994	Kitt Peak	Spacewatch	·	2.3 km	MPC · JPL
237371	1995 DG_{8}	—	February 24, 1995	Kitt Peak	Spacewatch	MAS	1.0 km	MPC · JPL
237372	1995 OV_{11}	—	July 27, 1995	Kitt Peak	Spacewatch	·	1.7 km	MPC · JPL
237373	1995 QE_{8}	—	August 25, 1995	Kitt Peak	Spacewatch	·	1.6 km	MPC · JPL
237374	1995 SV_{7}	—	September 17, 1995	Kitt Peak	Spacewatch	·	3.1 km	MPC · JPL
237375	1995 SM_{16}	—	September 18, 1995	Kitt Peak	Spacewatch	RAF	1.3 km	MPC · JPL
237376	1995 SW_{50}	—	September 26, 1995	Kitt Peak	Spacewatch	·	1.9 km	MPC · JPL
237377	1995 SZ_{63}	—	September 26, 1995	Kitt Peak	Spacewatch	·	3.8 km	MPC · JPL
237378	1995 SA_{82}	—	September 22, 1995	Kitt Peak	Spacewatch	·	4.1 km	MPC · JPL
237379	1995 US_{67}	—	October 18, 1995	Kitt Peak	Spacewatch	·	4.2 km	MPC · JPL
237380	1995 VB_{5}	—	November 14, 1995	Kitt Peak	Spacewatch	·	3.8 km	MPC · JPL
237381	1995 VF_{9}	—	November 14, 1995	Kitt Peak	Spacewatch	·	5.0 km	MPC · JPL
237382	1995 VV_{18}	—	November 14, 1995	Xinglong	SCAP	·	1.1 km	MPC · JPL
237383	1996 AF_{10}	—	January 13, 1996	Kitt Peak	Spacewatch	·	1.7 km	MPC · JPL
237384	1996 CX	—	February 7, 1996	Xinglong	SCAP	H	800 m	MPC · JPL
237385	1996 EV_{15}	—	March 13, 1996	Kitt Peak	Spacewatch	·	2.8 km	MPC · JPL
237386	1996 HW_{5}	—	April 17, 1996	Kitt Peak	Spacewatch	HOF	3.5 km	MPC · JPL
237387	1996 PM_{1}	—	August 1, 1996	Haleakala	AMOS	·	6.8 km	MPC · JPL
237388	1996 TL	—	October 3, 1996	Prescott	P. G. Comba	·	4.5 km	MPC · JPL
237389	1996 VE_{20}	—	November 8, 1996	Kitt Peak	Spacewatch	EOS	3.4 km	MPC · JPL
237390	1996 XP_{20}	—	December 5, 1996	Kitt Peak	Spacewatch	·	3.3 km	MPC · JPL
237391	1997 AX_{10}	—	January 9, 1997	Kitt Peak	Spacewatch	H	710 m	MPC · JPL
237392	1997 JH_{4}	—	May 1, 1997	Socorro	LINEAR	·	960 m	MPC · JPL
237393	1997 LG	—	June 1, 1997	Kitt Peak	Spacewatch	·	1.0 km	MPC · JPL
237394	1997 SZ_{13}	—	September 28, 1997	Kitt Peak	Spacewatch	·	2.1 km	MPC · JPL
237395	1997 SD_{22}	—	September 27, 1997	Kitt Peak	Spacewatch	·	1.2 km	MPC · JPL
237396	1997 SW_{23}	—	September 29, 1997	Kitt Peak	Spacewatch	·	2.6 km	MPC · JPL
237397 Mccauleyrench	1998 AQ_{9}	Mccauleyrench	January 6, 1998	Anderson Mesa	M. W. Buie	·	1.7 km	MPC · JPL
237398	1998 BZ_{42}	—	January 22, 1998	Kitt Peak	Spacewatch	T_{j} (2.98)	5.4 km	MPC · JPL
237399	1998 HR_{118}	—	April 23, 1998	Socorro	LINEAR	·	3.8 km	MPC · JPL
237400	1998 MT_{1}	—	June 16, 1998	Kitt Peak	Spacewatch	·	3.5 km	MPC · JPL

== 237401–237500 ==
back to top

Designation			Discovery			Properties		Ref
Permanent	Provisional	Named after	Date	Site	Discoverer(s)	Category	Diam.	Ref
237401	1998 QL_{25}	—	August 17, 1998	Socorro	LINEAR	·	1.1 km	MPC · JPL
237402	1998 QV_{28}	—	August 23, 1998	Xinglong	SCAP	·	2.0 km	MPC · JPL
237403	1998 QS_{73}	—	August 24, 1998	Socorro	LINEAR	·	4.2 km	MPC · JPL
237404	1998 RS_{29}	—	September 14, 1998	Socorro	LINEAR	·	2.9 km	MPC · JPL
237405	1998 RE_{66}	—	September 14, 1998	Socorro	LINEAR	EUN	2.7 km	MPC · JPL
237406	1998 SV_{30}	—	September 19, 1998	Kitt Peak	Spacewatch	·	2.4 km	MPC · JPL
237407	1998 SS_{34}	—	September 26, 1998	Socorro	LINEAR	·	3.2 km	MPC · JPL
237408	1998 SA_{72}	—	September 21, 1998	La Silla	E. W. Elst	·	2.1 km	MPC · JPL
237409	1998 SA_{114}	—	September 26, 1998	Socorro	LINEAR	·	3.5 km	MPC · JPL
237410	1998 SN_{140}	—	September 26, 1998	Socorro	LINEAR	EUN	1.9 km	MPC · JPL
237411	1998 SN_{155}	—	September 26, 1998	Socorro	LINEAR	·	3.3 km	MPC · JPL
237412	1998 SC_{160}	—	September 26, 1998	Socorro	LINEAR	·	2.2 km	MPC · JPL
237413	1998 TP_{27}	—	October 15, 1998	Kitt Peak	Spacewatch	·	3.4 km	MPC · JPL
237414	1998 UL_{2}	—	October 20, 1998	Caussols	ODAS	NAE	6.0 km	MPC · JPL
237415	1998 UR_{7}	—	October 22, 1998	Višnjan	K. Korlević	·	3.1 km	MPC · JPL
237416	1998 UT_{19}	—	October 28, 1998	Socorro	LINEAR	·	1.7 km	MPC · JPL
237417	1998 UV_{23}	—	October 17, 1998	Anderson Mesa	LONEOS	·	3.4 km	MPC · JPL
237418	1998 UQ_{47}	—	October 27, 1998	Kitt Peak	Spacewatch	·	3.6 km	MPC · JPL
237419	1998 WY_{34}	—	November 18, 1998	Kitt Peak	Spacewatch	AGN	1.6 km	MPC · JPL
237420	1998 XW_{6}	—	December 8, 1998	Kitt Peak	Spacewatch	·	2.6 km	MPC · JPL
237421	1998 XS_{61}	—	December 15, 1998	Kitt Peak	Spacewatch	(2076)	1.1 km	MPC · JPL
237422	1999 AF_{35}	—	January 9, 1999	Mérida	Naranjo, O. A.	·	1.0 km	MPC · JPL
237423	1999 BD_{27}	—	January 16, 1999	Kitt Peak	Spacewatch	·	5.2 km	MPC · JPL
237424	1999 CS_{92}	—	February 10, 1999	Socorro	LINEAR	·	4.3 km	MPC · JPL
237425	1999 FY_{10}	—	March 16, 1999	Kitt Peak	Spacewatch	MAS	950 m	MPC · JPL
237426	1999 FG_{74}	—	March 20, 1999	Apache Point	SDSS	·	2.9 km	MPC · JPL
237427	1999 FF_{87}	—	March 21, 1999	Apache Point	SDSS	·	4.1 km	MPC · JPL
237428	1999 FZ_{95}	—	March 21, 1999	Apache Point	SDSS	TIR	2.4 km	MPC · JPL
237429	1999 GH_{58}	—	April 7, 1999	Socorro	LINEAR	PHO	1.7 km	MPC · JPL
237430	1999 JL_{4}	—	May 10, 1999	Socorro	LINEAR	PHO	3.2 km	MPC · JPL
237431	1999 JK_{85}	—	May 14, 1999	Socorro	LINEAR	·	4.0 km	MPC · JPL
237432	1999 JH_{96}	—	May 12, 1999	Socorro	LINEAR	·	1.5 km	MPC · JPL
237433	1999 NA_{43}	—	July 15, 1999	Socorro	LINEAR	T_{j} (2.98)	5.1 km	MPC · JPL
237434	1999 PH_{3}	—	August 10, 1999	Ondřejov	P. Pravec, P. Kušnirák	·	5.6 km	MPC · JPL
237435	1999 RH_{9}	—	September 4, 1999	Kitt Peak	Spacewatch	CYB	4.0 km	MPC · JPL
237436	1999 RC_{29}	—	September 7, 1999	Socorro	LINEAR	·	2.0 km	MPC · JPL
237437	1999 RO_{40}	—	September 7, 1999	Socorro	LINEAR	·	2.2 km	MPC · JPL
237438	1999 RR_{77}	—	September 7, 1999	Socorro	LINEAR	NYS	1.6 km	MPC · JPL
237439	1999 RM_{138}	—	September 9, 1999	Socorro	LINEAR	(5)	1.5 km	MPC · JPL
237440	1999 RQ_{148}	—	September 9, 1999	Socorro	LINEAR	·	2.0 km	MPC · JPL
237441	1999 RP_{195}	—	September 8, 1999	Socorro	LINEAR	·	3.3 km	MPC · JPL
237442	1999 TA_{10}	—	October 5, 1999	Socorro	LINEAR	AMO +1km	830 m	MPC · JPL
237443	1999 TE_{54}	—	October 6, 1999	Kitt Peak	Spacewatch	·	2.1 km	MPC · JPL
237444	1999 TZ_{66}	—	October 8, 1999	Kitt Peak	Spacewatch	EUN	1.8 km	MPC · JPL
237445	1999 TF_{73}	—	October 10, 1999	Kitt Peak	Spacewatch	·	1.8 km	MPC · JPL
237446	1999 TL_{75}	—	October 10, 1999	Kitt Peak	Spacewatch	·	2.0 km	MPC · JPL
237447	1999 TD_{87}	—	October 15, 1999	Kitt Peak	Spacewatch	(5)	1.3 km	MPC · JPL
237448	1999 TJ_{141}	—	October 6, 1999	Socorro	LINEAR	·	2.0 km	MPC · JPL
237449	1999 TJ_{152}	—	October 15, 1999	Socorro	LINEAR	·	1.6 km	MPC · JPL
237450	1999 TB_{182}	—	October 11, 1999	Socorro	LINEAR	·	1.8 km	MPC · JPL
237451	1999 TR_{211}	—	October 15, 1999	Socorro	LINEAR	·	1.6 km	MPC · JPL
237452	1999 TK_{214}	—	October 15, 1999	Socorro	LINEAR	·	2.9 km	MPC · JPL
237453	1999 TV_{264}	—	October 3, 1999	Socorro	LINEAR	·	7.0 km	MPC · JPL
237454	1999 VM_{82}	—	November 5, 1999	Socorro	LINEAR	EUN	2.0 km	MPC · JPL
237455	1999 VM_{94}	—	November 9, 1999	Socorro	LINEAR	·	2.4 km	MPC · JPL
237456	1999 VS_{119}	—	November 3, 1999	Kitt Peak	Spacewatch	·	2.8 km	MPC · JPL
237457	1999 VK_{128}	—	November 9, 1999	Kitt Peak	Spacewatch	HOF	2.9 km	MPC · JPL
237458	1999 VG_{131}	—	November 9, 1999	Kitt Peak	Spacewatch	·	2.0 km	MPC · JPL
237459	1999 VL_{134}	—	November 10, 1999	Kitt Peak	Spacewatch	AGN	1.4 km	MPC · JPL
237460	1999 VK_{158}	—	November 14, 1999	Socorro	LINEAR	·	4.6 km	MPC · JPL
237461	1999 VC_{191}	—	November 9, 1999	Socorro	LINEAR	·	4.1 km	MPC · JPL
237462	1999 VY_{206}	—	November 10, 1999	Kitt Peak	Spacewatch	·	2.2 km	MPC · JPL
237463	1999 XQ_{171}	—	December 10, 1999	Socorro	LINEAR	·	2.2 km	MPC · JPL
237464	1999 XR_{218}	—	December 15, 1999	Kitt Peak	Spacewatch	·	2.4 km	MPC · JPL
237465	1999 YG_{19}	—	December 29, 1999	Mauna Kea	Veillet, C.	·	910 m	MPC · JPL
237466	2000 AZ_{135}	—	January 4, 2000	Socorro	LINEAR	·	960 m	MPC · JPL
237467	2000 BA_{39}	—	January 27, 2000	Kitt Peak	Spacewatch	HOF	3.8 km	MPC · JPL
237468	2000 BB_{42}	—	January 30, 2000	Kitt Peak	Spacewatch	·	790 m	MPC · JPL
237469	2000 BR_{47}	—	January 27, 2000	Kitt Peak	Spacewatch	·	2.2 km	MPC · JPL
237470	2000 CT_{135}	—	February 4, 2000	Kitt Peak	Spacewatch	·	2.4 km	MPC · JPL
237471	2000 DR_{20}	—	February 29, 2000	Socorro	LINEAR	·	2.1 km	MPC · JPL
237472	2000 DF_{51}	—	February 29, 2000	Socorro	LINEAR	·	2.0 km	MPC · JPL
237473	2000 EY_{9}	—	March 3, 2000	Socorro	LINEAR	·	4.2 km	MPC · JPL
237474	2000 EW_{46}	—	March 9, 2000	Socorro	LINEAR	·	1.3 km	MPC · JPL
237475	2000 FZ_{6}	—	March 29, 2000	Kitt Peak	Spacewatch	·	1.8 km	MPC · JPL
237476	2000 FE_{18}	—	March 29, 2000	Socorro	LINEAR	·	5.8 km	MPC · JPL
237477	2000 FU_{59}	—	March 29, 2000	Socorro	LINEAR	PHO	1.1 km	MPC · JPL
237478	2000 GD_{37}	—	April 5, 2000	Socorro	LINEAR	·	920 m	MPC · JPL
237479	2000 GL_{70}	—	April 5, 2000	Socorro	LINEAR	·	1.0 km	MPC · JPL
237480	2000 GS_{82}	—	April 4, 2000	Socorro	LINEAR	H	730 m	MPC · JPL
237481	2000 GJ_{122}	—	April 7, 2000	Kitt Peak	Spacewatch	·	3.6 km	MPC · JPL
237482	2000 HZ_{18}	—	April 25, 2000	Kitt Peak	Spacewatch	·	1.3 km	MPC · JPL
237483	2000 HY_{27}	—	April 28, 2000	Socorro	LINEAR	PHO	1.6 km	MPC · JPL
237484	2000 HJ_{47}	—	April 29, 2000	Socorro	LINEAR	·	1.1 km	MPC · JPL
237485	2000 HL_{63}	—	April 26, 2000	Anderson Mesa	LONEOS	·	1.1 km	MPC · JPL
237486	2000 KM_{2}	—	May 26, 2000	Socorro	LINEAR	·	1.7 km	MPC · JPL
237487	2000 KU_{12}	—	May 28, 2000	Socorro	LINEAR	·	1.1 km	MPC · JPL
237488	2000 KP_{34}	—	May 27, 2000	Socorro	LINEAR	·	1.0 km	MPC · JPL
237489	2000 LG_{7}	—	June 6, 2000	Kitt Peak	Spacewatch	·	1.1 km	MPC · JPL
237490	2000 LM_{15}	—	June 4, 2000	Kitt Peak	Spacewatch	·	1.4 km	MPC · JPL
237491	2000 OS_{33}	—	July 30, 2000	Socorro	LINEAR	·	2.5 km	MPC · JPL
237492	2000 OY_{39}	—	July 30, 2000	Socorro	LINEAR	V	1.2 km	MPC · JPL
237493	2000 QD_{32}	—	August 26, 2000	Socorro	LINEAR	·	1.3 km	MPC · JPL
237494	2000 QV_{33}	—	August 26, 2000	Prescott	P. G. Comba	·	1.6 km	MPC · JPL
237495	2000 QF_{56}	—	August 26, 2000	Socorro	LINEAR	·	2.1 km	MPC · JPL
237496	2000 QF_{76}	—	August 24, 2000	Socorro	LINEAR	·	1.2 km	MPC · JPL
237497	2000 QR_{81}	—	August 24, 2000	Socorro	LINEAR	·	1.4 km	MPC · JPL
237498	2000 QC_{85}	—	August 25, 2000	Socorro	LINEAR	·	1.9 km	MPC · JPL
237499	2000 QT_{97}	—	August 28, 2000	Socorro	LINEAR	·	5.5 km	MPC · JPL
237500	2000 QU_{134}	—	August 26, 2000	Socorro	LINEAR	·	1.1 km	MPC · JPL

== 237501–237600 ==
back to top

Designation			Discovery			Properties		Ref
Permanent	Provisional	Named after	Date	Site	Discoverer(s)	Category	Diam.	Ref
237501	2000 QK_{160}	—	August 31, 2000	Socorro	LINEAR	·	1.9 km	MPC · JPL
237502	2000 QZ_{175}	—	August 31, 2000	Socorro	LINEAR	·	2.9 km	MPC · JPL
237503	2000 QP_{186}	—	August 26, 2000	Socorro	LINEAR	·	1.7 km	MPC · JPL
237504	2000 QF_{188}	—	August 26, 2000	Socorro	LINEAR	·	2.1 km	MPC · JPL
237505	2000 QH_{192}	—	August 26, 2000	Socorro	LINEAR	·	4.7 km	MPC · JPL
237506	2000 RO_{29}	—	September 1, 2000	Socorro	LINEAR	·	2.2 km	MPC · JPL
237507	2000 RA_{34}	—	September 1, 2000	Socorro	LINEAR	·	1.9 km	MPC · JPL
237508	2000 RE_{51}	—	September 5, 2000	Socorro	LINEAR	·	2.9 km	MPC · JPL
237509	2000 RG_{60}	—	September 8, 2000	Črni Vrh	Mikuž, H.	·	2.0 km	MPC · JPL
237510	2000 RM_{69}	—	September 2, 2000	Socorro	LINEAR	·	1.8 km	MPC · JPL
237511	2000 RZ_{90}	—	September 3, 2000	Socorro	LINEAR	·	6.2 km	MPC · JPL
237512	2000 RP_{97}	—	September 5, 2000	Anderson Mesa	LONEOS	·	8.2 km	MPC · JPL
237513	2000 RK_{100}	—	September 5, 2000	Anderson Mesa	LONEOS	(194)	3.1 km	MPC · JPL
237514	2000 SO_{2}	—	September 20, 2000	Socorro	LINEAR	·	3.4 km	MPC · JPL
237515	2000 SS_{6}	—	September 21, 2000	Socorro	LINEAR	·	1.1 km	MPC · JPL
237516	2000 SO_{19}	—	September 23, 2000	Socorro	LINEAR	ADE	3.8 km	MPC · JPL
237517	2000 SP_{31}	—	September 24, 2000	Socorro	LINEAR	V	900 m	MPC · JPL
237518	2000 SN_{45}	—	September 22, 2000	Socorro	LINEAR	·	3.9 km	MPC · JPL
237519	2000 SO_{47}	—	September 23, 2000	Socorro	LINEAR	T_{j} (2.99) · EUP	5.6 km	MPC · JPL
237520	2000 SP_{49}	—	September 23, 2000	Socorro	LINEAR	·	4.7 km	MPC · JPL
237521	2000 SF_{105}	—	September 24, 2000	Socorro	LINEAR	MAS	1.3 km	MPC · JPL
237522	2000 ST_{145}	—	September 24, 2000	Socorro	LINEAR	·	4.4 km	MPC · JPL
237523	2000 SB_{160}	—	September 22, 2000	Socorro	LINEAR	·	2.3 km	MPC · JPL
237524	2000 SK_{251}	—	September 24, 2000	Socorro	LINEAR	NYS	3.0 km	MPC · JPL
237525	2000 SB_{257}	—	September 24, 2000	Socorro	LINEAR	(5)	1.7 km	MPC · JPL
237526	2000 SY_{264}	—	September 26, 2000	Socorro	LINEAR	V	1.1 km	MPC · JPL
237527	2000 SK_{269}	—	September 27, 2000	Socorro	LINEAR	·	3.1 km	MPC · JPL
237528	2000 SR_{271}	—	September 27, 2000	Socorro	LINEAR	V	1.1 km	MPC · JPL
237529	2000 SM_{282}	—	September 23, 2000	Socorro	LINEAR	·	5.4 km	MPC · JPL
237530	2000 SQ_{282}	—	September 23, 2000	Socorro	LINEAR	·	1.6 km	MPC · JPL
237531	2000 SY_{291}	—	September 27, 2000	Socorro	LINEAR	·	1.4 km	MPC · JPL
237532	2000 SK_{301}	—	September 28, 2000	Socorro	LINEAR	·	5.8 km	MPC · JPL
237533	2000 SJ_{317}	—	September 30, 2000	Socorro	LINEAR	·	4.8 km	MPC · JPL
237534	2000 SJ_{321}	—	September 28, 2000	Kitt Peak	Spacewatch	NYS	1.4 km	MPC · JPL
237535	2000 SR_{376}	—	September 29, 2000	Anderson Mesa	LONEOS	·	3.5 km	MPC · JPL
237536	2000 TW_{12}	—	October 1, 2000	Socorro	LINEAR	·	2.5 km	MPC · JPL
237537	2000 TP_{13}	—	October 1, 2000	Socorro	LINEAR	·	1.6 km	MPC · JPL
237538	2000 TP_{18}	—	October 1, 2000	Socorro	LINEAR	slow	1.5 km	MPC · JPL
237539	2000 TT_{24}	—	October 2, 2000	Socorro	LINEAR	·	4.2 km	MPC · JPL
237540	2000 UN	—	October 20, 2000	Ondřejov	P. Kušnirák	H	770 m	MPC · JPL
237541	2000 UB_{16}	—	October 24, 2000	Socorro	LINEAR	(116763)	2.3 km	MPC · JPL
237542	2000 UK_{29}	—	October 24, 2000	Socorro	LINEAR	H	930 m	MPC · JPL
237543	2000 UX_{29}	—	October 25, 2000	Socorro	LINEAR	·	2.9 km	MPC · JPL
237544	2000 UU_{36}	—	October 24, 2000	Socorro	LINEAR	·	1.5 km	MPC · JPL
237545	2000 UR_{37}	—	October 24, 2000	Socorro	LINEAR	NYS	1.9 km	MPC · JPL
237546	2000 UZ_{75}	—	October 25, 2000	Socorro	LINEAR	H	870 m	MPC · JPL
237547	2000 UP_{78}	—	October 24, 2000	Socorro	LINEAR	V	1.1 km	MPC · JPL
237548	2000 UZ_{83}	—	October 31, 2000	Socorro	LINEAR	(69559)	6.5 km	MPC · JPL
237549	2000 UW_{84}	—	October 31, 2000	Socorro	LINEAR	NYS	1.8 km	MPC · JPL
237550	2000 UG_{113}	—	October 25, 2000	Socorro	LINEAR	·	3.2 km	MPC · JPL
237551	2000 WQ_{19}	—	November 21, 2000	Socorro	LINEAR	APO	630 m	MPC · JPL
237552	2000 WH_{66}	—	November 20, 2000	Socorro	LINEAR	·	4.9 km	MPC · JPL
237553	2000 WG_{83}	—	November 20, 2000	Socorro	LINEAR	·	2.0 km	MPC · JPL
237554	2000 WT_{86}	—	November 20, 2000	Socorro	LINEAR	·	6.8 km	MPC · JPL
237555	2000 WB_{136}	—	November 20, 2000	Kitt Peak	Spacewatch	·	2.2 km	MPC · JPL
237556	2000 WN_{154}	—	November 30, 2000	Socorro	LINEAR	·	2.1 km	MPC · JPL
237557	2000 WF_{182}	—	November 25, 2000	Socorro	LINEAR	·	3.1 km	MPC · JPL
237558	2000 XC_{47}	—	December 15, 2000	Socorro	LINEAR	·	3.6 km	MPC · JPL
237559	2000 YS_{6}	—	December 20, 2000	Socorro	LINEAR	·	3.7 km	MPC · JPL
237560	2000 YD_{14}	—	December 23, 2000	Kitt Peak	Spacewatch	EUN	1.9 km	MPC · JPL
237561	2000 YY_{25}	—	December 23, 2000	Socorro	LINEAR	BRG	2.5 km	MPC · JPL
237562	2000 YP_{80}	—	December 30, 2000	Socorro	LINEAR	·	1.5 km	MPC · JPL
237563	2000 YX_{108}	—	December 30, 2000	Socorro	LINEAR	·	2.0 km	MPC · JPL
237564	2000 YZ_{126}	—	December 29, 2000	Anderson Mesa	LONEOS	·	4.5 km	MPC · JPL
237565	2001 AV_{11}	—	January 2, 2001	Socorro	LINEAR	(5)	1.8 km	MPC · JPL
237566	2001 BW_{1}	—	January 16, 2001	Haleakala	NEAT	·	2.0 km	MPC · JPL
237567	2001 BD_{4}	—	January 18, 2001	Socorro	LINEAR	BRG	2.1 km	MPC · JPL
237568	2001 BG_{7}	—	January 19, 2001	Socorro	LINEAR	·	2.2 km	MPC · JPL
237569	2001 BS_{9}	—	January 19, 2001	Socorro	LINEAR	·	2.2 km	MPC · JPL
237570	2001 BT_{57}	—	January 20, 2001	Haleakala	NEAT	·	2.6 km	MPC · JPL
237571	2001 CE_{19}	—	February 2, 2001	Socorro	LINEAR	·	3.4 km	MPC · JPL
237572	2001 DA_{2}	—	February 16, 2001	Kitt Peak	Spacewatch	·	1.6 km	MPC · JPL
237573	2001 DM_{25}	—	February 17, 2001	Socorro	LINEAR	·	2.0 km	MPC · JPL
237574	2001 DY_{47}	—	February 19, 2001	Nogales	Tenagra II	·	2.1 km	MPC · JPL
237575	2001 DW_{49}	—	February 16, 2001	Socorro	LINEAR	·	3.0 km	MPC · JPL
237576	2001 DN_{52}	—	February 17, 2001	Socorro	LINEAR	·	1.9 km	MPC · JPL
237577	2001 DF_{59}	—	February 17, 2001	Socorro	LINEAR	EUN	1.6 km	MPC · JPL
237578	2001 DX_{61}	—	February 19, 2001	Socorro	LINEAR	·	1.7 km	MPC · JPL
237579	2001 DR_{63}	—	February 19, 2001	Socorro	LINEAR	·	4.6 km	MPC · JPL
237580	2001 DS_{105}	—	February 16, 2001	Anderson Mesa	LONEOS	·	3.8 km	MPC · JPL
237581	2001 DZ_{108}	—	February 16, 2001	Socorro	LINEAR	ADE	4.1 km	MPC · JPL
237582	2001 EP_{14}	—	March 15, 2001	Socorro	LINEAR	ADE	4.1 km	MPC · JPL
237583	2001 FO_{4}	—	March 19, 2001	Kitt Peak	Spacewatch	JUN	1.4 km	MPC · JPL
237584	2001 FL_{15}	—	March 19, 2001	Anderson Mesa	LONEOS	JUN	2.8 km	MPC · JPL
237585	2001 FC_{18}	—	March 19, 2001	Anderson Mesa	LONEOS	EUN	1.8 km	MPC · JPL
237586	2001 FF_{19}	—	March 19, 2001	Anderson Mesa	LONEOS	·	1.7 km	MPC · JPL
237587	2001 FP_{34}	—	March 18, 2001	Socorro	LINEAR	·	3.2 km	MPC · JPL
237588	2001 FO_{39}	—	March 18, 2001	Socorro	LINEAR	·	2.7 km	MPC · JPL
237589	2001 FU_{101}	—	March 17, 2001	Socorro	LINEAR	·	3.3 km	MPC · JPL
237590	2001 FX_{113}	—	March 19, 2001	Anderson Mesa	LONEOS	EUN	3.1 km	MPC · JPL
237591	2001 FN_{131}	—	March 20, 2001	Haleakala	NEAT	·	3.7 km	MPC · JPL
237592	2001 FK_{164}	—	March 18, 2001	Socorro	LINEAR	ADE	2.7 km	MPC · JPL
237593	2001 FB_{175}	—	March 20, 2001	Anderson Mesa	LONEOS	·	3.0 km	MPC · JPL
237594	2001 FT_{179}	—	March 20, 2001	Anderson Mesa	LONEOS	·	2.2 km	MPC · JPL
237595	2001 GQ_{4}	—	April 14, 2001	Socorro	LINEAR	JUN	2.3 km	MPC · JPL
237596	2001 KH_{33}	—	May 23, 2001	Bergisch Gladbach	W. Bickel	·	4.6 km	MPC · JPL
237597	2001 KZ_{49}	—	May 24, 2001	Socorro	LINEAR	·	3.7 km	MPC · JPL
237598	2001 KO_{67}	—	May 27, 2001	Kitt Peak	Spacewatch	·	2.6 km	MPC · JPL
237599	2001 OH_{4}	—	July 19, 2001	Palomar	NEAT	·	1.3 km	MPC · JPL
237600	2001 OC_{6}	—	July 17, 2001	Anderson Mesa	LONEOS	·	3.2 km	MPC · JPL

== 237601–237700 ==
back to top

Designation			Discovery			Properties		Ref
Permanent	Provisional	Named after	Date	Site	Discoverer(s)	Category	Diam.	Ref
237601	2001 OY_{88}	—	July 21, 2001	Haleakala	NEAT	·	2.6 km	MPC · JPL
237602	2001 PT_{11}	—	August 11, 2001	Palomar	NEAT	DOR	3.4 km	MPC · JPL
237603	2001 PY_{11}	—	August 11, 2001	Palomar	NEAT	·	4.7 km	MPC · JPL
237604	2001 PN_{25}	—	August 11, 2001	Haleakala	NEAT	·	3.3 km	MPC · JPL
237605	2001 PJ_{44}	—	August 15, 2001	Haleakala	NEAT	URS	7.6 km	MPC · JPL
237606	2001 QH_{57}	—	August 16, 2001	Socorro	LINEAR	·	1.0 km	MPC · JPL
237607	2001 QQ_{71}	—	August 21, 2001	Emerald Lane	L. Ball	·	3.1 km	MPC · JPL
237608	2001 QQ_{78}	—	August 16, 2001	Socorro	LINEAR	TIR ·	7.8 km	MPC · JPL
237609	2001 QZ_{108}	—	August 19, 2001	Haleakala	NEAT	TIR	4.8 km	MPC · JPL
237610	2001 QB_{142}	—	August 24, 2001	Socorro	LINEAR	·	1.6 km	MPC · JPL
237611	2001 QN_{172}	—	August 25, 2001	Socorro	LINEAR	·	4.0 km	MPC · JPL
237612	2001 QZ_{230}	—	August 24, 2001	Anderson Mesa	LONEOS	·	6.4 km	MPC · JPL
237613	2001 QD_{249}	—	August 24, 2001	Socorro	LINEAR	·	1.1 km	MPC · JPL
237614	2001 QY_{262}	—	August 25, 2001	Socorro	LINEAR	·	2.3 km	MPC · JPL
237615	2001 QH_{280}	—	August 19, 2001	Socorro	LINEAR	·	3.0 km	MPC · JPL
237616	2001 RN_{4}	—	September 8, 2001	Socorro	LINEAR	·	950 m	MPC · JPL
237617	2001 RT_{30}	—	September 7, 2001	Socorro	LINEAR	·	2.6 km	MPC · JPL
237618	2001 RZ_{31}	—	September 8, 2001	Socorro	LINEAR	fast	2.3 km	MPC · JPL
237619	2001 RF_{52}	—	September 12, 2001	Socorro	LINEAR	·	740 m	MPC · JPL
237620	2001 RM_{55}	—	September 12, 2001	Socorro	LINEAR	·	3.7 km	MPC · JPL
237621	2001 RM_{56}	—	September 12, 2001	Socorro	LINEAR	·	3.0 km	MPC · JPL
237622	2001 RU_{71}	—	September 10, 2001	Socorro	LINEAR	EUP	5.7 km	MPC · JPL
237623	2001 RY_{98}	—	September 12, 2001	Socorro	LINEAR	EOS	3.8 km	MPC · JPL
237624	2001 RO_{100}	—	September 12, 2001	Socorro	LINEAR	·	1.1 km	MPC · JPL
237625	2001 RA_{101}	—	September 12, 2001	Socorro	LINEAR	THM	4.0 km	MPC · JPL
237626	2001 RX_{103}	—	September 12, 2001	Socorro	LINEAR	·	960 m	MPC · JPL
237627	2001 RG_{108}	—	September 12, 2001	Socorro	LINEAR	·	5.2 km	MPC · JPL
237628	2001 RL_{114}	—	September 12, 2001	Socorro	LINEAR	·	970 m	MPC · JPL
237629	2001 RZ_{128}	—	September 12, 2001	Socorro	LINEAR	·	4.4 km	MPC · JPL
237630	2001 RJ_{147}	—	September 9, 2001	Palomar	NEAT	LIX	5.1 km	MPC · JPL
237631	2001 RR_{149}	—	September 11, 2001	Anderson Mesa	LONEOS	·	2.3 km	MPC · JPL
237632	2001 SM_{15}	—	September 16, 2001	Socorro	LINEAR	·	4.7 km	MPC · JPL
237633	2001 SS_{26}	—	September 16, 2001	Socorro	LINEAR	·	880 m	MPC · JPL
237634	2001 SX_{34}	—	September 16, 2001	Socorro	LINEAR	·	4.6 km	MPC · JPL
237635	2001 SX_{46}	—	September 16, 2001	Socorro	LINEAR	·	2.2 km	MPC · JPL
237636	2001 SA_{53}	—	September 16, 2001	Socorro	LINEAR	·	1.1 km	MPC · JPL
237637	2001 SV_{57}	—	September 17, 2001	Socorro	LINEAR	·	1.1 km	MPC · JPL
237638	2001 SD_{68}	—	September 17, 2001	Socorro	LINEAR	·	990 m	MPC · JPL
237639	2001 SA_{89}	—	September 20, 2001	Socorro	LINEAR	·	6.9 km	MPC · JPL
237640	2001 SU_{91}	—	September 20, 2001	Socorro	LINEAR	·	1.1 km	MPC · JPL
237641	2001 SE_{93}	—	September 20, 2001	Socorro	LINEAR	·	830 m	MPC · JPL
237642	2001 SV_{94}	—	September 20, 2001	Socorro	LINEAR	·	4.0 km	MPC · JPL
237643	2001 SP_{98}	—	September 20, 2001	Socorro	LINEAR	EOS	2.2 km	MPC · JPL
237644	2001 SC_{103}	—	September 20, 2001	Socorro	LINEAR	·	4.1 km	MPC · JPL
237645	2001 SR_{130}	—	September 16, 2001	Socorro	LINEAR	·	5.0 km	MPC · JPL
237646	2001 SR_{140}	—	September 16, 2001	Socorro	LINEAR	·	5.2 km	MPC · JPL
237647	2001 SK_{145}	—	September 16, 2001	Socorro	LINEAR	·	1.0 km	MPC · JPL
237648	2001 SZ_{148}	—	September 17, 2001	Socorro	LINEAR	·	910 m	MPC · JPL
237649	2001 SQ_{157}	—	September 17, 2001	Socorro	LINEAR	EOS	4.9 km	MPC · JPL
237650	2001 SS_{157}	—	September 17, 2001	Socorro	LINEAR	·	1.6 km	MPC · JPL
237651	2001 SY_{163}	—	September 17, 2001	Socorro	LINEAR	EOS	3.3 km	MPC · JPL
237652	2001 SE_{164}	—	September 17, 2001	Socorro	LINEAR	TIR	5.1 km	MPC · JPL
237653	2001 SS_{167}	—	September 19, 2001	Socorro	LINEAR	·	3.2 km	MPC · JPL
237654	2001 SE_{169}	—	September 19, 2001	Socorro	LINEAR	·	1.5 km	MPC · JPL
237655	2001 SC_{172}	—	September 16, 2001	Socorro	LINEAR	·	760 m	MPC · JPL
237656	2001 SV_{185}	—	September 19, 2001	Socorro	LINEAR	·	7.2 km	MPC · JPL
237657	2001 SS_{193}	—	September 19, 2001	Socorro	LINEAR	·	3.1 km	MPC · JPL
237658	2001 SM_{196}	—	September 19, 2001	Socorro	LINEAR	·	880 m	MPC · JPL
237659	2001 SB_{203}	—	September 19, 2001	Socorro	LINEAR	·	770 m	MPC · JPL
237660	2001 SH_{203}	—	September 19, 2001	Socorro	LINEAR	NYS	1.3 km	MPC · JPL
237661	2001 SJ_{215}	—	September 19, 2001	Socorro	LINEAR	·	2.0 km	MPC · JPL
237662	2001 SA_{218}	—	September 19, 2001	Socorro	LINEAR	·	4.4 km	MPC · JPL
237663	2001 SH_{223}	—	September 19, 2001	Socorro	LINEAR	NYS	820 m	MPC · JPL
237664	2001 SM_{227}	—	September 19, 2001	Socorro	LINEAR	·	1.0 km	MPC · JPL
237665	2001 SV_{230}	—	September 19, 2001	Socorro	LINEAR	·	6.6 km	MPC · JPL
237666	2001 SV_{241}	—	September 19, 2001	Socorro	LINEAR	·	3.8 km	MPC · JPL
237667	2001 SU_{252}	—	September 19, 2001	Socorro	LINEAR	·	5.8 km	MPC · JPL
237668	2001 SH_{260}	—	September 20, 2001	Socorro	LINEAR	·	5.7 km	MPC · JPL
237669	2001 SJ_{279}	—	September 21, 2001	Anderson Mesa	LONEOS	·	6.4 km	MPC · JPL
237670	2001 SP_{282}	—	September 21, 2001	Socorro	LINEAR	·	3.5 km	MPC · JPL
237671	2001 SS_{285}	—	September 22, 2001	Kitt Peak	Spacewatch	MAS	710 m	MPC · JPL
237672	2001 SB_{327}	—	September 18, 2001	Kitt Peak	Spacewatch	EOS	2.4 km	MPC · JPL
237673	2001 SY_{348}	—	September 28, 2001	Palomar	NEAT	EOS	3.9 km	MPC · JPL
237674	2001 SV_{349}	—	September 19, 2001	Socorro	LINEAR	·	950 m	MPC · JPL
237675	2001 TH_{1}	—	October 10, 2001	Kitt Peak	Spacewatch	·	1.4 km	MPC · JPL
237676	2001 TJ_{10}	—	October 13, 2001	Socorro	LINEAR	·	1.1 km	MPC · JPL
237677	2001 TD_{57}	—	October 13, 2001	Socorro	LINEAR	·	6.7 km	MPC · JPL
237678	2001 TV_{61}	—	October 13, 2001	Socorro	LINEAR	EOS	3.1 km	MPC · JPL
237679	2001 TV_{75}	—	October 13, 2001	Socorro	LINEAR	·	6.7 km	MPC · JPL
237680	2001 TK_{97}	—	October 14, 2001	Socorro	LINEAR	·	1.0 km	MPC · JPL
237681	2001 TS_{108}	—	October 14, 2001	Socorro	LINEAR	·	780 m	MPC · JPL
237682	2001 TE_{110}	—	October 14, 2001	Socorro	LINEAR	V	1.1 km	MPC · JPL
237683	2001 TY_{122}	—	October 15, 2001	Socorro	LINEAR	·	3.7 km	MPC · JPL
237684	2001 TT_{134}	—	October 13, 2001	Palomar	NEAT	·	1.8 km	MPC · JPL
237685	2001 TE_{157}	—	October 14, 2001	Kitt Peak	Spacewatch	NAE	3.4 km	MPC · JPL
237686	2001 TD_{159}	—	October 11, 2001	Palomar	NEAT	·	3.3 km	MPC · JPL
237687	2001 TX_{163}	—	October 11, 2001	Palomar	NEAT	V	650 m	MPC · JPL
237688	2001 TQ_{174}	—	October 15, 2001	Socorro	LINEAR	·	4.2 km	MPC · JPL
237689	2001 TR_{175}	—	October 14, 2001	Socorro	LINEAR	·	2.7 km	MPC · JPL
237690	2001 TW_{195}	—	October 15, 2001	Palomar	NEAT	·	5.8 km	MPC · JPL
237691	2001 TG_{202}	—	October 11, 2001	Socorro	LINEAR	·	1.1 km	MPC · JPL
237692	2001 TY_{248}	—	October 14, 2001	Apache Point	SDSS	·	4.2 km	MPC · JPL
237693 Anakovacicek	2001 TB_{253}	Anakovacicek	October 14, 2001	Apache Point	SDSS	HYG	2.9 km	MPC · JPL
237694	2001 TB_{255}	—	October 14, 2001	Apache Point	SDSS	TIR	3.4 km	MPC · JPL
237695	2001 UJ_{32}	—	October 16, 2001	Socorro	LINEAR	·	4.9 km	MPC · JPL
237696	2001 UM_{37}	—	October 17, 2001	Socorro	LINEAR	·	6.5 km	MPC · JPL
237697	2001 UQ_{47}	—	October 17, 2001	Socorro	LINEAR	·	890 m	MPC · JPL
237698	2001 UL_{60}	—	October 17, 2001	Socorro	LINEAR	·	5.0 km	MPC · JPL
237699	2001 UX_{62}	—	October 17, 2001	Socorro	LINEAR	·	2.8 km	MPC · JPL
237700	2001 UG_{67}	—	October 20, 2001	Socorro	LINEAR	·	6.1 km	MPC · JPL

== 237701–237800 ==
back to top

Designation			Discovery			Properties		Ref
Permanent	Provisional	Named after	Date	Site	Discoverer(s)	Category	Diam.	Ref
237701	2001 UM_{74}	—	October 17, 2001	Socorro	LINEAR	·	5.1 km	MPC · JPL
237702	2001 UJ_{80}	—	October 20, 2001	Socorro	LINEAR	NYS	1.2 km	MPC · JPL
237703	2001 UJ_{82}	—	October 20, 2001	Socorro	LINEAR	·	1.2 km	MPC · JPL
237704	2001 UC_{85}	—	October 16, 2001	Kitt Peak	Spacewatch	·	4.4 km	MPC · JPL
237705	2001 UF_{97}	—	October 17, 2001	Socorro	LINEAR	·	5.5 km	MPC · JPL
237706	2001 UF_{111}	—	October 21, 2001	Socorro	LINEAR	·	4.0 km	MPC · JPL
237707	2001 UT_{136}	—	October 23, 2001	Socorro	LINEAR	·	1.0 km	MPC · JPL
237708	2001 UB_{153}	—	October 23, 2001	Socorro	LINEAR	·	4.6 km	MPC · JPL
237709	2001 UN_{161}	—	October 23, 2001	Socorro	LINEAR	·	1.5 km	MPC · JPL
237710	2001 UW_{184}	—	October 16, 2001	Palomar	NEAT	L5	14 km	MPC · JPL
237711	2001 UB_{196}	—	October 18, 2001	Palomar	NEAT	·	4.0 km	MPC · JPL
237712	2001 UT_{200}	—	October 19, 2001	Palomar	NEAT	·	4.2 km	MPC · JPL
237713	2001 UB_{203}	—	October 19, 2001	Haleakala	NEAT	·	4.7 km	MPC · JPL
237714	2001 UG_{212}	—	October 21, 2001	Socorro	LINEAR	·	900 m	MPC · JPL
237715	2001 UW_{213}	—	October 23, 2001	Socorro	LINEAR	·	4.8 km	MPC · JPL
237716	2001 UX_{228}	—	October 16, 2001	Palomar	NEAT	·	1.4 km	MPC · JPL
237717	2001 VB_{59}	—	November 10, 2001	Socorro	LINEAR	·	2.7 km	MPC · JPL
237718	2001 VH_{82}	—	November 10, 2001	Socorro	LINEAR	·	1.6 km	MPC · JPL
237719	2001 VX_{129}	—	November 11, 2001	Apache Point	SDSS	·	3.9 km	MPC · JPL
237720	2001 VH_{133}	—	November 11, 2001	Apache Point	SDSS	·	1.1 km	MPC · JPL
237721	2001 WL_{3}	—	November 16, 2001	Kitt Peak	Spacewatch	·	3.9 km	MPC · JPL
237722	2001 WF_{7}	—	November 17, 2001	Socorro	LINEAR	MAS	900 m	MPC · JPL
237723	2001 WF_{9}	—	November 17, 2001	Socorro	LINEAR	·	6.0 km	MPC · JPL
237724	2001 WH_{19}	—	November 17, 2001	Socorro	LINEAR	·	3.4 km	MPC · JPL
237725	2001 WH_{26}	—	November 17, 2001	Socorro	LINEAR	MAS	770 m	MPC · JPL
237726	2001 WT_{26}	—	November 17, 2001	Socorro	LINEAR	·	5.2 km	MPC · JPL
237727	2001 WO_{56}	—	November 19, 2001	Socorro	LINEAR	·	1.9 km	MPC · JPL
237728	2001 WJ_{64}	—	November 19, 2001	Socorro	LINEAR	·	4.0 km	MPC · JPL
237729	2001 WB_{71}	—	November 20, 2001	Socorro	LINEAR	·	1.3 km	MPC · JPL
237730	2001 WP_{71}	—	November 20, 2001	Socorro	LINEAR	·	3.3 km	MPC · JPL
237731	2001 WW_{80}	—	November 20, 2001	Socorro	LINEAR	·	1.1 km	MPC · JPL
237732	2001 WC_{93}	—	November 21, 2001	Socorro	LINEAR	·	1.5 km	MPC · JPL
237733	2001 WP_{103}	—	November 17, 2001	Socorro	LINEAR	V	890 m	MPC · JPL
237734	2001 XV_{25}	—	December 10, 2001	Socorro	LINEAR	·	3.0 km	MPC · JPL
237735	2001 XJ_{31}	—	December 11, 2001	Socorro	LINEAR	·	2.3 km	MPC · JPL
237736	2001 XA_{34}	—	December 8, 2001	Socorro	LINEAR	·	1.2 km	MPC · JPL
237737	2001 XB_{53}	—	December 10, 2001	Socorro	LINEAR	NYS ·	2.6 km	MPC · JPL
237738	2001 XN_{74}	—	December 11, 2001	Socorro	LINEAR	EOS	3.5 km	MPC · JPL
237739	2001 XE_{75}	—	December 11, 2001	Socorro	LINEAR	·	1.2 km	MPC · JPL
237740	2001 XS_{112}	—	December 11, 2001	Socorro	LINEAR	·	6.9 km	MPC · JPL
237741	2001 XU_{121}	—	December 14, 2001	Socorro	LINEAR	·	6.0 km	MPC · JPL
237742	2001 XH_{122}	—	December 14, 2001	Socorro	LINEAR	·	1.8 km	MPC · JPL
237743	2001 XV_{125}	—	December 14, 2001	Socorro	LINEAR	NYS	1.3 km	MPC · JPL
237744	2001 XM_{128}	—	December 14, 2001	Socorro	LINEAR	·	1.4 km	MPC · JPL
237745	2001 XD_{151}	—	December 14, 2001	Socorro	LINEAR	·	2.1 km	MPC · JPL
237746	2001 XC_{158}	—	December 14, 2001	Socorro	LINEAR	·	2.1 km	MPC · JPL
237747	2001 XO_{179}	—	December 14, 2001	Socorro	LINEAR	NYS	1.5 km	MPC · JPL
237748	2001 XT_{234}	—	December 15, 2001	Socorro	LINEAR	NYS	1.3 km	MPC · JPL
237749	2001 XU_{245}	—	December 15, 2001	Socorro	LINEAR	·	1.6 km	MPC · JPL
237750	2001 XP_{246}	—	December 15, 2001	Socorro	LINEAR	HYG	5.0 km	MPC · JPL
237751	2001 XR_{248}	—	December 14, 2001	Kitt Peak	Spacewatch	·	5.6 km	MPC · JPL
237752	2001 XB_{249}	—	December 14, 2001	Kitt Peak	Spacewatch	·	2.0 km	MPC · JPL
237753	2001 XL_{251}	—	December 14, 2001	Socorro	LINEAR	NYS	1.7 km	MPC · JPL
237754	2001 YE_{19}	—	December 17, 2001	Socorro	LINEAR	·	3.5 km	MPC · JPL
237755	2001 YN_{61}	—	December 18, 2001	Socorro	LINEAR	MAS	1.0 km	MPC · JPL
237756	2001 YH_{84}	—	December 18, 2001	Socorro	LINEAR	·	1.7 km	MPC · JPL
237757	2001 YV_{127}	—	December 17, 2001	Socorro	LINEAR	·	1.6 km	MPC · JPL
237758	2001 YH_{130}	—	December 17, 2001	Socorro	LINEAR	·	1.6 km	MPC · JPL
237759	2001 YF_{132}	—	December 19, 2001	Socorro	LINEAR	·	1.5 km	MPC · JPL
237760	2001 YU_{136}	—	December 22, 2001	Socorro	LINEAR	·	1.4 km	MPC · JPL
237761	2001 YN_{148}	—	December 18, 2001	Socorro	LINEAR	·	1.1 km	MPC · JPL
237762	2002 AP_{2}	—	January 5, 2002	Socorro	LINEAR	·	2.8 km	MPC · JPL
237763	2002 AL_{13}	—	January 11, 2002	Desert Eagle	W. K. Y. Yeung	MAS	970 m	MPC · JPL
237764	2002 AZ_{20}	—	January 9, 2002	Haleakala	NEAT	H	760 m	MPC · JPL
237765	2002 AV_{27}	—	January 7, 2002	Anderson Mesa	LONEOS	·	2.0 km	MPC · JPL
237766	2002 AT_{32}	—	January 8, 2002	Palomar	NEAT	·	1.9 km	MPC · JPL
237767	2002 AZ_{47}	—	January 9, 2002	Socorro	LINEAR	·	1.5 km	MPC · JPL
237768	2002 AE_{59}	—	January 9, 2002	Socorro	LINEAR	·	1.8 km	MPC · JPL
237769	2002 AJ_{74}	—	January 8, 2002	Socorro	LINEAR	·	1.3 km	MPC · JPL
237770	2002 AV_{75}	—	January 8, 2002	Socorro	LINEAR	NYS	1.7 km	MPC · JPL
237771	2002 AT_{77}	—	January 8, 2002	Socorro	LINEAR	MAS	980 m	MPC · JPL
237772	2002 AM_{85}	—	January 9, 2002	Socorro	LINEAR	V	1.1 km	MPC · JPL
237773	2002 AW_{93}	—	January 8, 2002	Socorro	LINEAR	·	1.6 km	MPC · JPL
237774	2002 AD_{97}	—	January 8, 2002	Socorro	LINEAR	·	1.5 km	MPC · JPL
237775	2002 AO_{100}	—	January 8, 2002	Socorro	LINEAR	·	1.5 km	MPC · JPL
237776	2002 AQ_{103}	—	January 9, 2002	Socorro	LINEAR	·	1.3 km	MPC · JPL
237777	2002 AH_{114}	—	January 9, 2002	Socorro	LINEAR	·	1.3 km	MPC · JPL
237778	2002 AJ_{114}	—	January 9, 2002	Socorro	LINEAR	·	1.7 km	MPC · JPL
237779	2002 AX_{115}	—	January 9, 2002	Socorro	LINEAR	·	2.5 km	MPC · JPL
237780	2002 AX_{121}	—	January 9, 2002	Socorro	LINEAR	·	2.7 km	MPC · JPL
237781	2002 AB_{128}	—	January 13, 2002	Socorro	LINEAR	BRG	2.2 km	MPC · JPL
237782	2002 AR_{134}	—	January 9, 2002	Socorro	LINEAR	·	1.6 km	MPC · JPL
237783	2002 AN_{152}	—	January 14, 2002	Socorro	LINEAR	EUN	2.2 km	MPC · JPL
237784	2002 AP_{172}	—	January 14, 2002	Socorro	LINEAR	NYS	1.3 km	MPC · JPL
237785	2002 AX_{176}	—	January 14, 2002	Socorro	LINEAR	·	1.8 km	MPC · JPL
237786	2002 AV_{182}	—	January 5, 2002	Anderson Mesa	LONEOS	·	1.4 km	MPC · JPL
237787	2002 AN_{184}	—	January 7, 2002	Anderson Mesa	LONEOS	·	1.8 km	MPC · JPL
237788	2002 AX_{201}	—	January 8, 2002	Socorro	LINEAR	·	1.8 km	MPC · JPL
237789	2002 BL_{1}	—	January 19, 2002	Desert Eagle	W. K. Y. Yeung	·	2.1 km	MPC · JPL
237790	2002 BO_{11}	—	January 19, 2002	Socorro	LINEAR	·	1.8 km	MPC · JPL
237791	2002 BO_{12}	—	January 20, 2002	Kitt Peak	Spacewatch	·	1.3 km	MPC · JPL
237792	2002 BV_{12}	—	January 21, 2002	Kitt Peak	Spacewatch	·	1.7 km	MPC · JPL
237793	2002 BL_{13}	—	January 18, 2002	Socorro	LINEAR	·	2.4 km	MPC · JPL
237794	2002 BT_{13}	—	January 19, 2002	Socorro	LINEAR	·	2.8 km	MPC · JPL
237795	2002 BV_{17}	—	January 21, 2002	Socorro	LINEAR	·	1.5 km	MPC · JPL
237796	2002 BU_{20}	—	January 21, 2002	Eskridge	G. Hug	·	2.9 km	MPC · JPL
237797	2002 BT_{21}	—	January 26, 2002	Socorro	LINEAR	H	830 m	MPC · JPL
237798	2002 BJ_{27}	—	January 19, 2002	Socorro	LINEAR	ADE	3.4 km	MPC · JPL
237799	2002 CA_{3}	—	February 3, 2002	Palomar	NEAT	·	1.5 km	MPC · JPL
237800	2002 CS_{9}	—	February 6, 2002	Socorro	LINEAR	H	760 m	MPC · JPL

== 237801–237900 ==
back to top

Designation			Discovery			Properties		Ref
Permanent	Provisional	Named after	Date	Site	Discoverer(s)	Category	Diam.	Ref
237801	2002 CX_{9}	—	February 6, 2002	Socorro	LINEAR	H	1.0 km	MPC · JPL
237802	2002 CZ_{10}	—	February 6, 2002	Socorro	LINEAR	H	970 m	MPC · JPL
237803	2002 CB_{20}	—	February 4, 2002	Palomar	NEAT	·	2.5 km	MPC · JPL
237804	2002 CP_{24}	—	February 6, 2002	Haleakala	NEAT	·	1.2 km	MPC · JPL
237805	2002 CF_{26}	—	February 10, 2002	Socorro	LINEAR	AMO +1km	700 m	MPC · JPL
237806	2002 CM_{44}	—	February 10, 2002	Socorro	LINEAR	H	670 m	MPC · JPL
237807	2002 CK_{54}	—	February 7, 2002	Socorro	LINEAR	·	2.5 km	MPC · JPL
237808	2002 CM_{69}	—	February 7, 2002	Socorro	LINEAR	·	1.7 km	MPC · JPL
237809	2002 CG_{72}	—	February 7, 2002	Socorro	LINEAR	·	1.1 km	MPC · JPL
237810	2002 CT_{77}	—	February 7, 2002	Socorro	LINEAR	MAS	1.0 km	MPC · JPL
237811	2002 CM_{78}	—	February 7, 2002	Socorro	LINEAR	MAS	940 m	MPC · JPL
237812	2002 CT_{80}	—	February 7, 2002	Socorro	LINEAR	·	1.7 km	MPC · JPL
237813	2002 CP_{84}	—	February 7, 2002	Socorro	LINEAR	·	1.3 km	MPC · JPL
237814	2002 CL_{97}	—	February 7, 2002	Socorro	LINEAR	(5)	1.8 km	MPC · JPL
237815	2002 CG_{111}	—	February 7, 2002	Socorro	LINEAR	·	1.9 km	MPC · JPL
237816	2002 CE_{124}	—	February 7, 2002	Socorro	LINEAR	·	1.4 km	MPC · JPL
237817	2002 CO_{127}	—	February 7, 2002	Socorro	LINEAR	V	1.0 km	MPC · JPL
237818	2002 CT_{139}	—	February 8, 2002	Socorro	LINEAR	·	3.3 km	MPC · JPL
237819	2002 CV_{156}	—	February 7, 2002	Socorro	LINEAR	·	1.2 km	MPC · JPL
237820	2002 CY_{156}	—	February 7, 2002	Socorro	LINEAR	·	1.3 km	MPC · JPL
237821	2002 CU_{160}	—	February 8, 2002	Socorro	LINEAR	·	1.4 km	MPC · JPL
237822	2002 CQ_{181}	—	February 10, 2002	Socorro	LINEAR	SYL · CYB	6.9 km	MPC · JPL
237823	2002 CU_{181}	—	February 10, 2002	Socorro	LINEAR	·	1.4 km	MPC · JPL
237824	2002 CC_{183}	—	February 10, 2002	Socorro	LINEAR	·	3.3 km	MPC · JPL
237825	2002 CA_{185}	—	February 10, 2002	Socorro	LINEAR	·	1.4 km	MPC · JPL
237826	2002 CX_{203}	—	February 10, 2002	Socorro	LINEAR	·	1.3 km	MPC · JPL
237827	2002 CW_{204}	—	February 10, 2002	Socorro	LINEAR	(5)	2.5 km	MPC · JPL
237828	2002 CC_{208}	—	February 10, 2002	Socorro	LINEAR	MAS	1.1 km	MPC · JPL
237829	2002 CW_{232}	—	February 10, 2002	Socorro	LINEAR	·	1.7 km	MPC · JPL
237830	2002 CZ_{258}	—	February 6, 2002	Anderson Mesa	LONEOS	·	1.9 km	MPC · JPL
237831	2002 CG_{292}	—	February 11, 2002	Socorro	LINEAR	V	870 m	MPC · JPL
237832	2002 CN_{307}	—	February 8, 2002	Socorro	LINEAR	·	1.8 km	MPC · JPL
237833	2002 CZ_{314}	—	February 6, 2002	Palomar	NEAT	·	2.2 km	MPC · JPL
237834	2002 DT_{3}	—	February 22, 2002	Socorro	LINEAR	BAR	1.8 km	MPC · JPL
237835	2002 DA_{20}	—	February 21, 2002	Anderson Mesa	LONEOS	HNS	1.9 km	MPC · JPL
237836	2002 ED_{6}	—	March 10, 2002	Nashville	Clingan, R.	·	2.6 km	MPC · JPL
237837	2002 EM_{69}	—	March 13, 2002	Socorro	LINEAR	·	5.4 km	MPC · JPL
237838	2002 EV_{71}	—	March 13, 2002	Socorro	LINEAR	T_{j} (2.91)	5.2 km	MPC · JPL
237839	2002 EA_{100}	—	March 5, 2002	Anderson Mesa	LONEOS	KON	3.3 km	MPC · JPL
237840	2002 EG_{127}	—	March 12, 2002	Palomar	NEAT	·	1.1 km	MPC · JPL
237841	2002 EU_{139}	—	March 12, 2002	Palomar	NEAT	·	2.0 km	MPC · JPL
237842	2002 EG_{151}	—	March 15, 2002	Palomar	NEAT	·	4.0 km	MPC · JPL
237843	2002 EF_{163}	—	March 5, 2002	Palomar	NEAT	ADE	3.1 km	MPC · JPL
237844	2002 FB_{5}	—	March 20, 2002	Socorro	LINEAR	H	690 m	MPC · JPL
237845 Neris	2002 FJ_{5}	Neris	March 16, 2002	Moletai	K. Černis, Zdanavicius, J.	·	2.8 km	MPC · JPL
237846	2002 FR_{25}	—	March 19, 2002	Palomar	NEAT	EUN	3.6 km	MPC · JPL
237847	2002 FE_{32}	—	March 20, 2002	Anderson Mesa	LONEOS	·	2.0 km	MPC · JPL
237848	2002 GW_{9}	—	April 14, 2002	Socorro	LINEAR	H	780 m	MPC · JPL
237849	2002 GS_{41}	—	April 4, 2002	Palomar	NEAT	3:2	8.5 km	MPC · JPL
237850	2002 GC_{61}	—	April 8, 2002	Palomar	NEAT	·	2.8 km	MPC · JPL
237851	2002 GQ_{71}	—	April 9, 2002	Anderson Mesa	LONEOS	·	3.6 km	MPC · JPL
237852	2002 GH_{73}	—	April 9, 2002	Anderson Mesa	LONEOS	·	2.1 km	MPC · JPL
237853	2002 GG_{78}	—	April 9, 2002	Socorro	LINEAR	·	2.7 km	MPC · JPL
237854	2002 GV_{105}	—	April 11, 2002	Anderson Mesa	LONEOS	EUN	1.4 km	MPC · JPL
237855	2002 GQ_{116}	—	April 11, 2002	Socorro	LINEAR	·	1.3 km	MPC · JPL
237856	2002 GV_{116}	—	April 11, 2002	Socorro	LINEAR	·	2.5 km	MPC · JPL
237857	2002 GJ_{126}	—	April 12, 2002	Palomar	NEAT	·	1.5 km	MPC · JPL
237858	2002 GB_{129}	—	April 12, 2002	Socorro	LINEAR	3:2	8.6 km	MPC · JPL
237859	2002 GA_{130}	—	April 12, 2002	Socorro	LINEAR	·	1.6 km	MPC · JPL
237860	2002 GR_{131}	—	April 12, 2002	Socorro	LINEAR	·	1.5 km	MPC · JPL
237861	2002 GF_{133}	—	April 12, 2002	Socorro	LINEAR	3:2 · SHU	5.7 km	MPC · JPL
237862	2002 GB_{137}	—	April 12, 2002	Socorro	LINEAR	·	1.5 km	MPC · JPL
237863	2002 GO_{151}	—	April 14, 2002	Palomar	NEAT	·	2.3 km	MPC · JPL
237864	2002 HF_{4}	—	April 16, 2002	Socorro	LINEAR	EUN	1.8 km	MPC · JPL
237865	2002 HQ_{4}	—	April 16, 2002	Socorro	LINEAR	H	770 m	MPC · JPL
237866	2002 JC_{6}	—	May 5, 2002	Palomar	NEAT	·	2.4 km	MPC · JPL
237867	2002 JT_{9}	—	May 6, 2002	Socorro	LINEAR	H	840 m	MPC · JPL
237868	2002 JC_{13}	—	May 8, 2002	Desert Eagle	W. K. Y. Yeung	·	2.8 km	MPC · JPL
237869	2002 JK_{44}	—	May 9, 2002	Socorro	LINEAR	H	1.0 km	MPC · JPL
237870	2002 JO_{60}	—	May 9, 2002	Palomar	NEAT	·	1.6 km	MPC · JPL
237871	2002 JU_{94}	—	May 11, 2002	Socorro	LINEAR	·	3.2 km	MPC · JPL
237872	2002 JE_{103}	—	May 9, 2002	Socorro	LINEAR	·	1.9 km	MPC · JPL
237873	2002 JC_{106}	—	May 13, 2002	Socorro	LINEAR	·	4.1 km	MPC · JPL
237874	2002 JM_{106}	—	May 11, 2002	Palomar	NEAT	·	4.5 km	MPC · JPL
237875	2002 JK_{116}	—	May 1, 2002	Palomar	NEAT	·	2.0 km	MPC · JPL
237876	2002 JE_{120}	—	May 5, 2002	Palomar	NEAT	EUN	1.6 km	MPC · JPL
237877	2002 JZ_{134}	—	May 9, 2002	Palomar	NEAT	RAF	1.4 km	MPC · JPL
237878	2002 JC_{145}	—	May 13, 2002	Palomar	NEAT	·	3.3 km	MPC · JPL
237879	2002 KF_{9}	—	May 29, 2002	Haleakala	NEAT	·	1.6 km	MPC · JPL
237880	2002 KS_{9}	—	May 17, 2002	Socorro	LINEAR	H	840 m	MPC · JPL
237881	2002 LN_{3}	—	June 3, 2002	Socorro	LINEAR	·	2.2 km	MPC · JPL
237882	2002 LZ_{9}	—	June 5, 2002	Socorro	LINEAR	·	1.8 km	MPC · JPL
237883	2002 LQ_{12}	—	June 5, 2002	Socorro	LINEAR	·	1.4 km	MPC · JPL
237884	2002 LY_{21}	—	June 8, 2002	Socorro	LINEAR	H	820 m	MPC · JPL
237885	2002 LE_{24}	—	June 9, 2002	Desert Eagle	W. K. Y. Yeung	·	4.5 km	MPC · JPL
237886	2002 LJ_{29}	—	June 9, 2002	Socorro	LINEAR	·	3.8 km	MPC · JPL
237887	2002 LE_{45}	—	June 5, 2002	Palomar	NEAT	·	2.0 km	MPC · JPL
237888	2002 LY_{46}	—	June 15, 2002	Palomar	NEAT	H	760 m	MPC · JPL
237889	2002 LK_{53}	—	June 8, 2002	Socorro	LINEAR	·	3.1 km	MPC · JPL
237890	2002 LJ_{60}	—	June 12, 2002	Socorro	LINEAR	·	3.0 km	MPC · JPL
237891	2002 LN_{62}	—	June 12, 2002	Palomar	NEAT	·	2.3 km	MPC · JPL
237892	2002 NG_{10}	—	July 4, 2002	Palomar	NEAT	·	2.8 km	MPC · JPL
237893	2002 NL_{32}	—	July 13, 2002	Socorro	LINEAR	·	2.8 km	MPC · JPL
237894	2002 NP_{39}	—	July 14, 2002	Socorro	LINEAR	JUN	2.3 km	MPC · JPL
237895	2002 NP_{45}	—	July 13, 2002	Palomar	NEAT	·	1.8 km	MPC · JPL
237896	2002 NR_{48}	—	July 14, 2002	Socorro	LINEAR	·	2.0 km	MPC · JPL
237897	2002 NJ_{57}	—	July 4, 2002	Palomar	S. F. Hönig	EUN	1.7 km	MPC · JPL
237898	2002 NW_{64}	—	July 2, 2002	Palomar	NEAT	·	1.9 km	MPC · JPL
237899	2002 NL_{67}	—	July 14, 2002	Palomar	NEAT	·	2.8 km	MPC · JPL
237900	2002 NT_{68}	—	July 12, 2002	Palomar	NEAT	EOS	5.2 km	MPC · JPL

== 237901–238000 ==
back to top

Designation			Discovery			Properties		Ref
Permanent	Provisional	Named after	Date	Site	Discoverer(s)	Category	Diam.	Ref
237901	2002 OU_{5}	—	July 20, 2002	Palomar	NEAT	EUN	1.7 km	MPC · JPL
237902	2002 OY_{11}	—	July 18, 2002	Socorro	LINEAR	·	2.1 km	MPC · JPL
237903	2002 OG_{16}	—	July 18, 2002	Socorro	LINEAR	·	6.5 km	MPC · JPL
237904	2002 PU_{17}	—	August 6, 2002	Palomar	NEAT	·	2.4 km	MPC · JPL
237905	2002 PA_{38}	—	August 5, 2002	Palomar	NEAT	·	2.4 km	MPC · JPL
237906	2002 PL_{43}	—	August 11, 2002	Socorro	LINEAR	H	1.2 km	MPC · JPL
237907	2002 PO_{52}	—	August 8, 2002	Palomar	NEAT	JUN	1.4 km	MPC · JPL
237908	2002 PO_{54}	—	August 5, 2002	Socorro	LINEAR	·	3.8 km	MPC · JPL
237909	2002 PC_{58}	—	August 9, 2002	Socorro	LINEAR	·	5.2 km	MPC · JPL
237910	2002 PM_{61}	—	August 11, 2002	Socorro	LINEAR	JUN	1.6 km	MPC · JPL
237911	2002 PT_{69}	—	August 11, 2002	Socorro	LINEAR	·	3.5 km	MPC · JPL
237912	2002 PU_{77}	—	August 11, 2002	Haleakala	NEAT	·	2.1 km	MPC · JPL
237913	2002 PC_{89}	—	August 11, 2002	Socorro	LINEAR	·	3.8 km	MPC · JPL
237914	2002 PR_{104}	—	August 12, 2002	Socorro	LINEAR	·	2.2 km	MPC · JPL
237915	2002 PH_{106}	—	August 12, 2002	Socorro	LINEAR	·	3.0 km	MPC · JPL
237916	2002 PU_{115}	—	August 13, 2002	Socorro	LINEAR	·	1.5 km	MPC · JPL
237917	2002 PO_{120}	—	August 13, 2002	Anderson Mesa	LONEOS	·	7.1 km	MPC · JPL
237918	2002 PK_{124}	—	August 13, 2002	Anderson Mesa	LONEOS	NEM	3.1 km	MPC · JPL
237919	2002 PP_{166}	—	August 14, 2002	Palomar	NEAT	·	4.2 km	MPC · JPL
237920	2002 PU_{171}	—	August 8, 2002	Palomar	NEAT	·	2.3 km	MPC · JPL
237921	2002 PF_{173}	—	August 8, 2002	Palomar	NEAT	HOF	3.9 km	MPC · JPL
237922	2002 PS_{174}	—	August 15, 2002	Palomar	NEAT	HOF	3.5 km	MPC · JPL
237923	2002 PA_{175}	—	August 11, 2002	Palomar	NEAT	HOF	2.5 km	MPC · JPL
237924	2002 PO_{178}	—	August 5, 2002	Palomar	NEAT	·	1.7 km	MPC · JPL
237925	2002 PY_{179}	—	August 8, 2002	Palomar	NEAT	·	2.2 km	MPC · JPL
237926	2002 PH_{183}	—	August 11, 2002	Palomar	NEAT	AGN	1.4 km	MPC · JPL
237927	2002 PG_{187}	—	August 11, 2002	Palomar	NEAT	PAD	3.0 km	MPC · JPL
237928	2002 PG_{189}	—	August 7, 2002	Palomar	NEAT	AGN	1.4 km	MPC · JPL
237929	2002 QX_{12}	—	August 26, 2002	Palomar	NEAT	KON	4.0 km	MPC · JPL
237930	2002 QY_{13}	—	August 26, 2002	Palomar	NEAT	·	4.2 km	MPC · JPL
237931	2002 QD_{27}	—	August 28, 2002	Palomar	NEAT	·	2.3 km	MPC · JPL
237932	2002 QO_{50}	—	August 16, 2002	Palomar	Lowe, A.	·	2.4 km	MPC · JPL
237933	2002 QN_{55}	—	August 29, 2002	Palomar	S. F. Hönig	KOR	1.7 km	MPC · JPL
237934	2002 QC_{64}	—	August 19, 2002	Palomar	NEAT	AGN	1.7 km	MPC · JPL
237935	2002 QJ_{77}	—	August 17, 2002	Palomar	NEAT	·	2.6 km	MPC · JPL
237936	2002 QF_{84}	—	August 27, 2002	Palomar	NEAT	KOR	1.7 km	MPC · JPL
237937	2002 QC_{85}	—	August 17, 2002	Palomar	NEAT	HOF	4.0 km	MPC · JPL
237938	2002 QM_{92}	—	August 29, 2002	Palomar	NEAT	GEF	1.5 km	MPC · JPL
237939	2002 QG_{93}	—	August 19, 2002	Palomar	NEAT	·	2.2 km	MPC · JPL
237940	2002 QR_{99}	—	August 18, 2002	Palomar	NEAT	·	2.5 km	MPC · JPL
237941	2002 QN_{102}	—	August 20, 2002	Palomar	NEAT	·	2.1 km	MPC · JPL
237942	2002 QB_{116}	—	August 18, 2002	Palomar	NEAT	·	2.3 km	MPC · JPL
237943	2002 QM_{127}	—	August 18, 2002	Palomar	NEAT	·	2.6 km	MPC · JPL
237944	2002 RM_{11}	—	September 4, 2002	Palomar	NEAT	·	3.0 km	MPC · JPL
237945	2002 RR_{18}	—	September 4, 2002	Anderson Mesa	LONEOS	·	1.9 km	MPC · JPL
237946	2002 RM_{29}	—	September 3, 2002	Haleakala	NEAT	·	3.1 km	MPC · JPL
237947	2002 RQ_{31}	—	September 4, 2002	Anderson Mesa	LONEOS	·	3.6 km	MPC · JPL
237948	2002 RU_{33}	—	September 4, 2002	Anderson Mesa	LONEOS	EOS	2.8 km	MPC · JPL
237949	2002 RU_{36}	—	September 5, 2002	Anderson Mesa	LONEOS	ADE	2.9 km	MPC · JPL
237950	2002 RO_{45}	—	September 5, 2002	Anderson Mesa	LONEOS	·	3.0 km	MPC · JPL
237951	2002 RD_{46}	—	September 5, 2002	Socorro	LINEAR	·	3.4 km	MPC · JPL
237952	2002 RQ_{60}	—	September 5, 2002	Anderson Mesa	LONEOS	·	2.5 km	MPC · JPL
237953	2002 RS_{69}	—	September 4, 2002	Anderson Mesa	LONEOS	·	4.5 km	MPC · JPL
237954	2002 RJ_{76}	—	September 5, 2002	Socorro	LINEAR	·	2.6 km	MPC · JPL
237955	2002 RW_{80}	—	September 5, 2002	Socorro	LINEAR	GEF	1.7 km	MPC · JPL
237956	2002 RF_{82}	—	September 5, 2002	Socorro	LINEAR	·	5.0 km	MPC · JPL
237957	2002 RQ_{89}	—	September 5, 2002	Socorro	LINEAR	·	2.9 km	MPC · JPL
237958	2002 RO_{109}	—	September 6, 2002	Socorro	LINEAR	·	6.6 km	MPC · JPL
237959	2002 RA_{111}	—	September 6, 2002	Nashville	Clingan, R.	·	2.4 km	MPC · JPL
237960	2002 RF_{124}	—	September 9, 2002	Haleakala	NEAT	·	3.9 km	MPC · JPL
237961	2002 RM_{140}	—	September 11, 2002	Haleakala	NEAT	EUN	3.7 km	MPC · JPL
237962	2002 RN_{148}	—	September 11, 2002	Palomar	NEAT	·	3.6 km	MPC · JPL
237963	2002 RC_{158}	—	September 11, 2002	Palomar	NEAT	·	6.7 km	MPC · JPL
237964	2002 RT_{161}	—	September 12, 2002	Palomar	NEAT	·	4.5 km	MPC · JPL
237965	2002 RV_{163}	—	September 12, 2002	Palomar	NEAT	·	2.8 km	MPC · JPL
237966	2002 RC_{165}	—	September 12, 2002	Palomar	NEAT	·	2.2 km	MPC · JPL
237967	2002 RB_{174}	—	September 13, 2002	Palomar	NEAT	·	3.1 km	MPC · JPL
237968	2002 RF_{176}	—	September 13, 2002	Palomar	NEAT	·	2.3 km	MPC · JPL
237969	2002 RA_{197}	—	September 12, 2002	Haleakala	NEAT	·	3.5 km	MPC · JPL
237970	2002 RW_{207}	—	September 14, 2002	Haleakala	NEAT	·	3.1 km	MPC · JPL
237971	2002 RY_{207}	—	September 14, 2002	Haleakala	NEAT	·	2.5 km	MPC · JPL
237972	2002 RN_{218}	—	September 14, 2002	Haleakala	NEAT	·	3.1 km	MPC · JPL
237973	2002 RN_{219}	—	September 15, 2002	Palomar	NEAT	KOR	1.9 km	MPC · JPL
237974	2002 RD_{225}	—	September 13, 2002	Palomar	NEAT	·	3.1 km	MPC · JPL
237975	2002 RM_{227}	—	September 14, 2002	Palomar	NEAT	·	1.9 km	MPC · JPL
237976	2002 RX_{227}	—	September 14, 2002	Haleakala	NEAT	·	2.9 km	MPC · JPL
237977	2002 RE_{237}	—	September 15, 2002	Palomar	R. Matson	·	2.6 km	MPC · JPL
237978	2002 RG_{244}	—	September 14, 2002	Palomar	NEAT	KOR	1.7 km	MPC · JPL
237979	2002 RP_{250}	—	September 8, 2002	Haleakala	NEAT	·	2.8 km	MPC · JPL
237980	2002 RV_{257}	—	September 14, 2002	Palomar	NEAT	·	2.1 km	MPC · JPL
237981	2002 RG_{266}	—	September 15, 2002	Palomar	NEAT	·	2.7 km	MPC · JPL
237982	2002 RG_{271}	—	September 4, 2002	Palomar	NEAT	KOR	1.5 km	MPC · JPL
237983	2002 SH_{2}	—	September 26, 2002	Palomar	NEAT	THM	3.6 km	MPC · JPL
237984	2002 SN_{16}	—	September 27, 2002	Palomar	NEAT	·	6.4 km	MPC · JPL
237985	2002 SC_{21}	—	September 26, 2002	Palomar	NEAT	TIR	3.3 km	MPC · JPL
237986	2002 SZ_{25}	—	September 28, 2002	Haleakala	NEAT	·	4.7 km	MPC · JPL
237987	2002 SY_{27}	—	September 26, 2002	Palomar	NEAT	THB	3.6 km	MPC · JPL
237988	2002 SM_{34}	—	September 29, 2002	Haleakala	NEAT	·	2.4 km	MPC · JPL
237989	2002 SN_{46}	—	September 29, 2002	Haleakala	NEAT	·	4.7 km	MPC · JPL
237990	2002 SR_{46}	—	September 29, 2002	Haleakala	NEAT	·	2.6 km	MPC · JPL
237991	2002 SV_{51}	—	September 17, 2002	Palomar	NEAT	EOS	3.1 km	MPC · JPL
237992	2002 SB_{52}	—	September 17, 2002	Palomar	NEAT	·	3.3 km	MPC · JPL
237993	2002 SB_{55}	—	September 30, 2002	Socorro	LINEAR	GEF	2.0 km	MPC · JPL
237994	2002 SU_{65}	—	September 16, 2002	Palomar	NEAT	·	2.4 km	MPC · JPL
237995	2002 SX_{65}	—	September 16, 2002	Palomar	NEAT	HOF	4.2 km	MPC · JPL
237996	2002 SR_{73}	—	September 16, 2002	Palomar	NEAT	·	2.8 km	MPC · JPL
237997	2002 TY_{18}	—	October 2, 2002	Socorro	LINEAR	·	6.8 km	MPC · JPL
237998	2002 TZ_{31}	—	October 2, 2002	Socorro	LINEAR	T_{j} (2.98)	5.2 km	MPC · JPL
237999	2002 TF_{46}	—	October 2, 2002	Haleakala	NEAT	·	3.3 km	MPC · JPL
238000	2002 TD_{61}	—	October 3, 2002	Campo Imperatore	CINEOS	·	4.6 km	MPC · JPL

back to top

== See also ==
- Meanings of minor-planet names: 237001–238000
