= Meanings of minor-planet names: 237001–238000 =

As minor planet discoveries are confirmed, they are given a permanent number by the IAU's Minor Planet Center (MPC), and the discoverers can then submit names for them, following the IAU's naming conventions. The list below concerns those minor planets in the specified number-range that have received names, and explains the meanings of those names.

Official naming citations of newly named small Solar System bodies are approved and published in a bulletin by IAU's Working Group for Small Bodies Nomenclature (WGSBN). Before May 2021, citations were published in MPC's Minor Planet Circulars for many decades. Recent citations can also be found on the JPL Small-Body Database (SBDB). Until his death in 2016, German astronomer Lutz D. Schmadel compiled these citations into the Dictionary of Minor Planet Names (DMP) and regularly updated the collection.

Based on Paul Herget's The Names of the Minor Planets, Schmadel also researched the unclear origin of numerous asteroids, most of which had been named prior to World War II. This article incorporates text from this source, which is in the public domain: SBDB New namings may only be added to this list below after official publication as the preannouncement of names is condemned. The WGSBN publishes a comprehensive guideline for the naming rules of non-cometary small Solar System bodies.

== 237001–237100 ==
| Named minor planet | Provisional | This minor planet was named for... | Ref · Catalog |
|---|---|---|---|
There are no named minor planets in this number range

== 237101–237200 ==
back to top

| Named minor planet | Provisional | This minor planet was named for... | Ref · Catalog |
|---|---|---|---|
| 237164 Keelung | 2008 UP_{128} | Keelung City is located at the northernmost tip of Taiwan. This port city is bordered by mountains on three sides and faces out towards the sea. Keelung enjoys an excellent natural harbor with deep water. | JPL · 237164 |
| 237187 Zhonglihe | 2008 UA_{212} | Chung Li-ho (1915–1960), a Taiwanese writer. Also known as "Zhong Li-he" or "Chung Li-ho", he is known for his novels about southern Taiwan's farming communities and their social transition in the early 20th century. | JPL · 237187 |

== 237201–237300 ==
back to top

| Named minor planet | Provisional | This minor planet was named for... | Ref · Catalog |
|---|---|---|---|
| 237265 Golobokov | 2008 WQ_{96} | Gennady G. Golobokov (1935–1978), a talented fiction-artist, bed-ridden for 26 years following a spinal injury. | JPL · 237265 |
| 237276 Nakama | 2008 XD_{2} | Nakama is a Japanese word meaning a group of persons who spontaneously come together and work for common purposes in education, community services, and other fields of work. | JPL · 237276 |
| 237277 Nevaruth | 2008 XR_{2} | Neva Ruth Daniel (1910–2000), a loving mother of three, was a gifted teacher of English and literature at Colorado Mountain College and a teacher of the Progoff System of Intensive Journal Writing. | JPL · 237277 |

== 237301–237400 ==
back to top

| Named minor planet | Provisional | This minor planet was named for... | Ref · Catalog |
|---|---|---|---|
| 237397 Mccauleyrench | 1998 AQ_{9} | Rebecca McCauley Rench (born 1985), American NASA management scientist who furthered the exploration of the Kuiper Belt. | JPL · 237397 |

== 237401–237500 ==
back to top

| Named minor planet | Provisional | This minor planet was named for... | Ref · Catalog |
|---|---|---|---|
There are no named minor planets in this number range

== 237501–237600 ==
back to top

| Named minor planet | Provisional | This minor planet was named for... | Ref · Catalog |
|---|---|---|---|
There are no named minor planets in this number range

== 237601–237700 ==
back to top

| Named minor planet | Provisional | This minor planet was named for... | Ref · Catalog |
|---|---|---|---|
| 237693 Anakovacicek | 2001 TB_{253} | Ana Kovacicek (1938–2021) was a teacher of mathematics and physics from Zagreb. She was awarded for her contribution to astronomy education in Croatia. | IAU · 237693 |

== 237701–237800 ==
back to top

| Named minor planet | Provisional | This minor planet was named for... | Ref · Catalog |
|---|---|---|---|
There are no named minor planets in this number range

== 237801–237900 ==
back to top

| Named minor planet | Provisional | This minor planet was named for... | Ref · Catalog |
|---|---|---|---|
| 237845 Neris | 2002 FJ_{5} | Neris, also known as Vilija, is the second longest river in Lithuania. | JPL · 237845 |

== 237901–238000 ==
back to top

| Named minor planet | Provisional | This minor planet was named for... | Ref · Catalog |
|---|---|---|---|
There are no named minor planets in this number range

back to top

| Preceded by 236,001–237,000 | Meanings of minor-planet names List of minor planets: 237,001–238,000 | Succeeded by 238,001–239,000 |
