= (237442) 1999 TA10 =

Asteroid and near-Earth object

(237442) 1999 TA_{10}
Discovery
- Discovered by: LINEAR
- Discovery site: Lincoln Laboratory ETS
- Discovery date: 5 October 1999

Designations
- Minor planet category: Amor asteroid (NEO)

Orbital characteristics
- Epoch 13 January 2016 (JD 2457400.5)
- Uncertainty parameter 0
- Observation arc: 5592 days (15.31 yr)
- Aphelion: 1.8695 AU (279.67 Gm) (Q)
- Perihelion: 1.1419 AU (170.83 Gm) (q)
- Semi-major axis: 1.5057 AU (225.25 Gm) (a)
- Eccentricity: 0.24161 (e)
- Orbital period (sidereal): 1.85 yr (674.85 d)
- Mean anomaly: 342.45° (M)
- Mean motion: 0° 32^{m} 0.42^{s} / day (n)
- Inclination: 20.843° (i)
- Longitude of ascending node: 214.68° (Ω)
- Argument of perihelion: 84.791° (ω)
- Earth MOID: 0.303797 AU (45.4474 Gm)

Physical characteristics
- Dimensions: 500–1500 meters
- Synodic rotation period: 14 h (0.58 d)
- Sidereal rotation period: 14 hr(?)
- Apparent magnitude: 16.77 (close approach) to 22.29
- Absolute magnitude (H): 18.1

(237442) 1999 TA_{10} is a near-Earth object (NEO) from the Amor asteroid group. It is suspected of being an inner fragment of the differentiated asteroid 4 Vesta.

Given an absolute magnitude (H) of 17.9, and that the albedo is unknown, this NEO could vary from 500 to 1500 meters in diameter.

1999 TA_{10} was discovered by LINEAR at Lincoln Laboratory ETS on 5 October 1999 at apparent magnitude 17.7, when it was only 0.39 AU from Earth. In 2010, it came within 0.3 AU of Earth. During the 2010 close approach, NASA Infrared Telescope Facility (NASA IRTF) studies suggested that 1999 TA_{10} originated from the interior of Vesta. The next close approach was in 2023. In 2086, it will come within 0.017 AU (2,500,000 km; 1,600,000 mi) of Mars.

== See also ==
- Vestoid
- V-type asteroid
