= List of minor planets: 238001–239000 =

The following is a partial list of minor planets, running from minor-planet number 238001 through 239000, inclusive. The primary data for this and other partial lists is based on JPL's "Small-Body Orbital Elements" and data available from the Minor Planet Center. Critical list information is also provided by the MPC, unless otherwise specified from Lowell Observatory. A detailed description of the table's columns and additional sources are given on the main page including a complete list of every page in this series, and a statistical break-up on the dynamical classification of minor planets.

Also see the summary list of all named bodies in numerical and alphabetical order, and the corresponding naming citations for the number range of this particular list. New namings may only be added to this list after official publication, as the preannouncement of names is condemned by the Working Group for Small Bodies Nomenclature of the International Astronomical Union.

Near-Earth obj.	MBA (inner)	MBA (outer)	Centaur
Mars-crosser	MBA (middle)	Jupiter trojan	Trans-Neptunian obj.
Unclassified

== 238001–238100 ==
Designation			Discovery			Properties		Ref
Permanent	Provisional	Named after	Date	Site	Discoverer(s)	Category	Diam.	Ref
238001	2002 TC_{105}	—	October 4, 2002	Socorro	LINEAR	·	2.6 km	MPC · JPL
238002	2002 TT_{111}	—	October 3, 2002	Socorro	LINEAR	AEO	1.8 km	MPC · JPL
238003	2002 TP_{124}	—	October 4, 2002	Socorro	LINEAR	·	3.3 km	MPC · JPL
238004	2002 TE_{140}	—	October 3, 2002	Socorro	LINEAR	KOR	2.1 km	MPC · JPL
238005	2002 TT_{140}	—	October 5, 2002	Kitt Peak	Spacewatch	·	2.9 km	MPC · JPL
238006	2002 TU_{153}	—	October 5, 2002	Socorro	LINEAR	·	4.9 km	MPC · JPL
238007	2002 TH_{165}	—	October 2, 2002	Haleakala	NEAT	·	4.6 km	MPC · JPL
238008	2002 TD_{212}	—	October 6, 2002	Haleakala	NEAT	LUT	7.2 km	MPC · JPL
238009	2002 TX_{212}	—	October 7, 2002	Haleakala	NEAT	·	2.4 km	MPC · JPL
238010	2002 TQ_{251}	—	October 7, 2002	Haleakala	NEAT	·	1.7 km	MPC · JPL
238011	2002 TE_{262}	—	October 10, 2002	Palomar	NEAT	·	3.1 km	MPC · JPL
238012	2002 TV_{304}	—	October 4, 2002	Apache Point	SDSS	DOR	4.0 km	MPC · JPL
238013	2002 TF_{314}	—	October 4, 2002	Apache Point	SDSS	·	3.6 km	MPC · JPL
238014	2002 TA_{320}	—	October 5, 2002	Apache Point	SDSS	KOR	1.7 km	MPC · JPL
238015	2002 TK_{355}	—	October 10, 2002	Apache Point	SDSS	·	1.9 km	MPC · JPL
238016	2002 TJ_{381}	—	October 9, 2002	Palomar	NEAT	·	2.8 km	MPC · JPL
238017	2002 UC_{18}	—	October 30, 2002	Palomar	NEAT	·	3.2 km	MPC · JPL
238018	2002 UL_{29}	—	October 31, 2002	Palomar	NEAT	·	5.6 km	MPC · JPL
238019	2002 UV_{29}	—	October 30, 2002	Kitt Peak	Spacewatch	·	2.2 km	MPC · JPL
238020	2002 UY_{58}	—	October 29, 2002	Apache Point	SDSS	·	2.5 km	MPC · JPL
238021	2002 UF_{72}	—	October 29, 2002	Palomar	NEAT	·	2.5 km	MPC · JPL
238022	2002 VE_{5}	—	November 5, 2002	Wrightwood	J. W. Young	THM	3.6 km	MPC · JPL
238023	2002 VT_{9}	—	November 1, 2002	Socorro	LINEAR	·	1.0 km	MPC · JPL
238024	2002 VE_{22}	—	November 5, 2002	Socorro	LINEAR	·	1.7 km	MPC · JPL
238025	2002 VR_{23}	—	November 5, 2002	Socorro	LINEAR	THM	3.3 km	MPC · JPL
238026	2002 VA_{38}	—	November 5, 2002	Socorro	LINEAR	·	5.8 km	MPC · JPL
238027	2002 VS_{49}	—	November 5, 2002	Anderson Mesa	LONEOS	·	4.1 km	MPC · JPL
238028	2002 VH_{93}	—	November 11, 2002	Socorro	LINEAR	·	3.5 km	MPC · JPL
238029	2002 VO_{104}	—	November 12, 2002	Socorro	LINEAR	·	6.4 km	MPC · JPL
238030	2002 VH_{126}	—	November 12, 2002	Socorro	LINEAR	·	1.2 km	MPC · JPL
238031	2002 WF_{4}	—	November 24, 2002	Palomar	NEAT	·	5.3 km	MPC · JPL
238032	2002 WZ_{8}	—	November 24, 2002	Palomar	NEAT	·	1.3 km	MPC · JPL
238033	2002 WA_{27}	—	November 24, 2002	Palomar	NEAT	THM	2.5 km	MPC · JPL
238034	2002 WB_{30}	—	November 23, 2002	Palomar	NEAT	·	2.8 km	MPC · JPL
238035	2002 XS_{44}	—	December 7, 2002	Socorro	LINEAR	·	3.0 km	MPC · JPL
238036	2002 XO_{48}	—	December 10, 2002	Socorro	LINEAR	·	1.9 km	MPC · JPL
238037	2002 XO_{70}	—	December 10, 2002	Socorro	LINEAR	·	5.9 km	MPC · JPL
238038	2002 XX_{76}	—	December 11, 2002	Socorro	LINEAR	·	2.7 km	MPC · JPL
238039	2002 XG_{78}	—	December 11, 2002	Socorro	LINEAR	(13314)	2.6 km	MPC · JPL
238040	2002 XG_{119}	—	December 10, 2002	Palomar	NEAT	·	4.8 km	MPC · JPL
238041	2002 YS_{33}	—	December 31, 2002	Kitt Peak	Spacewatch	·	1.0 km	MPC · JPL
238042	2003 AF_{5}	—	January 1, 2003	Socorro	LINEAR	·	4.1 km	MPC · JPL
238043	2003 AO_{28}	—	January 4, 2003	Socorro	LINEAR	·	970 m	MPC · JPL
238044	2003 AF_{33}	—	January 5, 2003	Socorro	LINEAR	·	750 m	MPC · JPL
238045	2003 AE_{50}	—	January 5, 2003	Socorro	LINEAR	·	5.2 km	MPC · JPL
238046	2003 BR_{19}	—	January 26, 2003	Haleakala	NEAT	·	1.2 km	MPC · JPL
238047	2003 BN_{20}	—	January 27, 2003	Anderson Mesa	LONEOS	·	1.0 km	MPC · JPL
238048	2003 BH_{37}	—	January 28, 2003	Kitt Peak	Spacewatch	·	1 km	MPC · JPL
238049	2003 BP_{40}	—	January 27, 2003	Haleakala	NEAT	·	1.2 km	MPC · JPL
238050	2003 BA_{41}	—	January 28, 2003	Socorro	LINEAR	·	940 m	MPC · JPL
238051	2003 BT_{51}	—	January 27, 2003	Socorro	LINEAR	ERI	2.1 km	MPC · JPL
238052	2003 BZ_{52}	—	January 27, 2003	Socorro	LINEAR	·	1.1 km	MPC · JPL
238053	2003 BQ_{56}	—	January 30, 2003	Anderson Mesa	LONEOS	·	1.4 km	MPC · JPL
238054	2003 BK_{71}	—	January 31, 2003	Socorro	LINEAR	ERI	2.4 km	MPC · JPL
238055	2003 BY_{72}	—	January 28, 2003	Haleakala	NEAT	·	1.2 km	MPC · JPL
238056	2003 BD_{74}	—	January 29, 2003	Palomar	NEAT	·	5.8 km	MPC · JPL
238057	2003 BD_{77}	—	January 30, 2003	Palomar	NEAT	·	1.2 km	MPC · JPL
238058	2003 CC_{2}	—	February 1, 2003	Socorro	LINEAR	·	1.3 km	MPC · JPL
238059	2003 CT_{3}	—	February 2, 2003	Anderson Mesa	LONEOS	·	1.4 km	MPC · JPL
238060	2003 CG_{7}	—	February 1, 2003	Socorro	LINEAR	·	820 m	MPC · JPL
238061	2003 CG_{17}	—	February 7, 2003	Desert Eagle	W. K. Y. Yeung	·	3.4 km	MPC · JPL
238062	2003 DP_{17}	—	February 22, 2003	Goodricke-Pigott	Kessel, J. W.	·	1.5 km	MPC · JPL
238063	2003 EG	—	March 3, 2003	Socorro	LINEAR	APO +1km	1.5 km	MPC · JPL
238064	2003 EA_{16}	—	March 7, 2003	Palomar	NEAT	·	1.2 km	MPC · JPL
238065	2003 ES_{22}	—	March 6, 2003	Socorro	LINEAR	·	1.1 km	MPC · JPL
238066	2003 EX_{32}	—	March 7, 2003	Anderson Mesa	LONEOS	(2076)	1.9 km	MPC · JPL
238067	2003 EH_{33}	—	March 7, 2003	Anderson Mesa	LONEOS	·	1.2 km	MPC · JPL
238068	2003 EK_{39}	—	March 8, 2003	Socorro	LINEAR	PHO	3.4 km	MPC · JPL
238069	2003 EQ_{40}	—	March 8, 2003	Socorro	LINEAR	PHO	1.4 km	MPC · JPL
238070	2003 EF_{57}	—	March 9, 2003	Anderson Mesa	LONEOS	PHO	1.2 km	MPC · JPL
238071	2003 FM_{1}	—	March 23, 2003	Haleakala	NEAT	PHO	2.1 km	MPC · JPL
238072	2003 FW_{7}	—	March 30, 2003	Socorro	LINEAR	·	2.0 km	MPC · JPL
238073	2003 FU_{18}	—	March 24, 2003	Kitt Peak	Spacewatch	·	1.7 km	MPC · JPL
238074	2003 FG_{32}	—	March 23, 2003	Kitt Peak	Spacewatch	·	1.7 km	MPC · JPL
238075	2003 FL_{57}	—	March 26, 2003	Palomar	NEAT	NYS	1.7 km	MPC · JPL
238076	2003 FA_{61}	—	March 26, 2003	Palomar	NEAT	·	2.4 km	MPC · JPL
238077	2003 FC_{69}	—	March 26, 2003	Kitt Peak	Spacewatch	·	1.1 km	MPC · JPL
238078	2003 FZ_{81}	—	March 27, 2003	Palomar	NEAT	·	1.1 km	MPC · JPL
238079	2003 FE_{90}	—	March 29, 2003	Anderson Mesa	LONEOS	·	4.6 km	MPC · JPL
238080	2003 FE_{94}	—	March 29, 2003	Anderson Mesa	LONEOS	·	1.8 km	MPC · JPL
238081	2003 FC_{95}	—	March 30, 2003	Anderson Mesa	LONEOS	·	1.1 km	MPC · JPL
238082	2003 FS_{98}	—	March 30, 2003	Socorro	LINEAR	PHO	3.0 km	MPC · JPL
238083	2003 FT_{98}	—	March 30, 2003	Socorro	LINEAR	·	1.4 km	MPC · JPL
238084	2003 FE_{99}	—	March 30, 2003	Socorro	LINEAR	NYS	1.4 km	MPC · JPL
238085	2003 FU_{111}	—	March 31, 2003	Socorro	LINEAR	·	1.4 km	MPC · JPL
238086	2003 FE_{115}	—	March 31, 2003	Anderson Mesa	LONEOS	PHO	3.4 km	MPC · JPL
238087	2003 FF_{123}	—	March 26, 2003	Palomar	NEAT	·	1.5 km	MPC · JPL
238088	2003 GY_{26}	—	April 5, 2003	Anderson Mesa	LONEOS	·	1.2 km	MPC · JPL
238089	2003 GA_{35}	—	April 8, 2003	Socorro	LINEAR	(2076)	1.3 km	MPC · JPL
238090	2003 GX_{44}	—	April 7, 2003	Socorro	LINEAR	V	960 m	MPC · JPL
238091	2003 GP_{49}	—	April 10, 2003	Kitt Peak	Spacewatch	·	1.1 km	MPC · JPL
238092	2003 GT_{49}	—	April 10, 2003	Kitt Peak	Spacewatch	·	890 m	MPC · JPL
238093	2003 HK_{14}	—	April 26, 2003	Socorro	LINEAR	PHO	2.7 km	MPC · JPL
238094	2003 HH_{17}	—	April 25, 2003	Anderson Mesa	LONEOS	(2076)	1.1 km	MPC · JPL
238095	2003 HH_{21}	—	April 26, 2003	Kitt Peak	Spacewatch	·	1.3 km	MPC · JPL
238096	2003 HJ_{25}	—	April 25, 2003	Kitt Peak	Spacewatch	·	760 m	MPC · JPL
238097	2003 HZ_{26}	—	April 27, 2003	Anderson Mesa	LONEOS	·	1.1 km	MPC · JPL
238098	2003 HN_{29}	—	April 28, 2003	Anderson Mesa	LONEOS	·	1.5 km	MPC · JPL
238099	2003 HZ_{29}	—	April 28, 2003	Anderson Mesa	LONEOS	·	1.3 km	MPC · JPL
238100	2003 HU_{35}	—	April 27, 2003	Socorro	LINEAR	·	1.4 km	MPC · JPL

== 238101–238200 ==
back to top

Designation			Discovery			Properties		Ref
Permanent	Provisional	Named after	Date	Site	Discoverer(s)	Category	Diam.	Ref
238101	2003 HD_{36}	—	April 27, 2003	Anderson Mesa	LONEOS	·	1.1 km	MPC · JPL
238102	2003 HL_{37}	—	April 26, 2003	Haleakala	NEAT	·	1.7 km	MPC · JPL
238103	2003 HH_{40}	—	April 29, 2003	Socorro	LINEAR	·	2.4 km	MPC · JPL
238104	2003 HT_{50}	—	April 28, 2003	Socorro	LINEAR	·	1.1 km	MPC · JPL
238105	2003 HX_{50}	—	April 28, 2003	Socorro	LINEAR	·	1.2 km	MPC · JPL
238106	2003 HZ_{57}	—	April 25, 2003	Kitt Peak	Spacewatch	·	1.9 km	MPC · JPL
238107	2003 JU_{3}	—	May 2, 2003	Kitt Peak	Spacewatch	·	2.4 km	MPC · JPL
238108	2003 JN_{7}	—	May 2, 2003	Socorro	LINEAR	·	1.2 km	MPC · JPL
238109	2003 JZ_{13}	—	May 5, 2003	Socorro	LINEAR	·	2.4 km	MPC · JPL
238110	2003 KA_{18}	—	May 27, 2003	Haleakala	NEAT	·	1.2 km	MPC · JPL
238111	2003 KJ_{28}	—	May 21, 2003	Anderson Mesa	LONEOS	·	1.9 km	MPC · JPL
238112	2003 KL_{36}	—	May 30, 2003	Socorro	LINEAR	·	2.7 km	MPC · JPL
238113	2003 KE_{37}	—	May 23, 2003	Kitt Peak	Spacewatch	·	1.2 km	MPC · JPL
238114	2003 MX	—	June 21, 2003	Bergisch Gladbach	W. Bickel	3:2	8.0 km	MPC · JPL
238115	2003 MM_{1}	—	June 23, 2003	Socorro	LINEAR	·	2.1 km	MPC · JPL
238116	2003 OE	—	July 18, 2003	Siding Spring	R. H. McNaught	·	1.5 km	MPC · JPL
238117	2003 OR_{4}	—	July 22, 2003	Haleakala	NEAT	(5)	1.6 km	MPC · JPL
238118	2003 OF_{18}	—	July 26, 2003	Socorro	LINEAR	·	2.0 km	MPC · JPL
238119	2003 OK_{19}	—	July 30, 2003	Palomar	NEAT	·	3.8 km	MPC · JPL
238120	2003 OV_{20}	—	July 31, 2003	Reedy Creek	J. Broughton	·	2.2 km	MPC · JPL
238121	2003 OO_{23}	—	July 22, 2003	Campo Imperatore	CINEOS	·	2.9 km	MPC · JPL
238122	2003 OO_{27}	—	July 24, 2003	Palomar	NEAT	NYS	1.5 km	MPC · JPL
238123	2003 OU_{28}	—	July 24, 2003	Palomar	NEAT	·	1.9 km	MPC · JPL
238124	2003 OY_{32}	—	July 23, 2003	Palomar	NEAT	HNS	1.6 km	MPC · JPL
238125	2003 PQ_{2}	—	August 2, 2003	Haleakala	NEAT	·	1.8 km	MPC · JPL
238126	2003 QW	—	August 18, 2003	Campo Imperatore	CINEOS	·	2.2 km	MPC · JPL
238127	2003 QB_{5}	—	August 20, 2003	Campo Imperatore	CINEOS	NYS	1.4 km	MPC · JPL
238128	2003 QH_{13}	—	August 22, 2003	Haleakala	NEAT	·	3.1 km	MPC · JPL
238129 Bernardwolfe	2003 QK_{31}	Bernardwolfe	August 24, 2003	Saint-Sulpice	B. Christophe	·	1.9 km	MPC · JPL
238130	2003 QQ_{33}	—	August 22, 2003	Socorro	LINEAR	·	1.9 km	MPC · JPL
238131	2003 QE_{55}	—	August 23, 2003	Socorro	LINEAR	·	1.9 km	MPC · JPL
238132	2003 QW_{58}	—	August 23, 2003	Palomar	NEAT	·	1.5 km	MPC · JPL
238133	2003 QA_{60}	—	August 23, 2003	Socorro	LINEAR	EUN	1.7 km	MPC · JPL
238134	2003 QG_{66}	—	August 22, 2003	Socorro	LINEAR	ADE	4.0 km	MPC · JPL
238135	2003 QL_{71}	—	August 24, 2003	Kvistaberg	Uppsala-DLR Asteroid Survey	H	650 m	MPC · JPL
238136	2003 QQ_{72}	—	August 23, 2003	Palomar	NEAT	HNS	1.8 km	MPC · JPL
238137	2003 QO_{103}	—	August 31, 2003	Haleakala	NEAT	·	1.6 km	MPC · JPL
238138	2003 QP_{111}	—	August 31, 2003	Socorro	LINEAR	·	4.4 km	MPC · JPL
238139	2003 RX	—	September 1, 2003	Socorro	LINEAR	H	820 m	MPC · JPL
238140	2003 RT_{7}	—	September 4, 2003	Reedy Creek	J. Broughton	slow	3.9 km	MPC · JPL
238141	2003 RN_{13}	—	September 15, 2003	Palomar	NEAT	·	2.3 km	MPC · JPL
238142	2003 RB_{24}	—	September 14, 2003	Haleakala	NEAT	·	3.9 km	MPC · JPL
238143	2003 SP_{18}	—	September 16, 2003	Kitt Peak	Spacewatch	·	2.7 km	MPC · JPL
238144	2003 SB_{20}	—	September 16, 2003	Kitt Peak	Spacewatch	·	2.8 km	MPC · JPL
238145	2003 SB_{31}	—	September 18, 2003	Kitt Peak	Spacewatch	·	3.7 km	MPC · JPL
238146	2003 SQ_{36}	—	September 18, 2003	Desert Eagle	W. K. Y. Yeung	·	2.3 km	MPC · JPL
238147	2003 SS_{38}	—	September 16, 2003	Palomar	NEAT	·	2.2 km	MPC · JPL
238148	2003 SQ_{39}	—	September 16, 2003	Palomar	NEAT	·	1.8 km	MPC · JPL
238149	2003 SC_{41}	—	September 17, 2003	Palomar	NEAT	HNS	1.6 km	MPC · JPL
238150	2003 SD_{41}	—	September 17, 2003	Palomar	NEAT	·	2.7 km	MPC · JPL
238151	2003 SJ_{41}	—	September 17, 2003	Palomar	NEAT	·	1.8 km	MPC · JPL
238152	2003 SG_{42}	—	September 17, 2003	Socorro	LINEAR	H	930 m	MPC · JPL
238153	2003 SY_{46}	—	September 16, 2003	Anderson Mesa	LONEOS	·	2.9 km	MPC · JPL
238154	2003 ST_{50}	—	September 18, 2003	Palomar	NEAT	HIL · 3:2	10 km	MPC · JPL
238155	2003 SW_{54}	—	September 16, 2003	Anderson Mesa	LONEOS	·	3.5 km	MPC · JPL
238156	2003 SA_{56}	—	September 16, 2003	Anderson Mesa	LONEOS	·	1.6 km	MPC · JPL
238157	2003 SC_{60}	—	September 17, 2003	Anderson Mesa	LONEOS	·	1.2 km	MPC · JPL
238158	2003 SV_{72}	—	September 18, 2003	Kitt Peak	Spacewatch	·	1.6 km	MPC · JPL
238159	2003 SN_{73}	—	September 18, 2003	Kitt Peak	Spacewatch	·	2.9 km	MPC · JPL
238160	2003 SQ_{73}	—	September 18, 2003	Kitt Peak	Spacewatch	·	3.7 km	MPC · JPL
238161	2003 SD_{81}	—	September 19, 2003	Kitt Peak	Spacewatch	·	1.6 km	MPC · JPL
238162	2003 SB_{86}	—	September 16, 2003	Kitt Peak	Spacewatch	EUN	1.5 km	MPC · JPL
238163	2003 SG_{91}	—	September 18, 2003	Socorro	LINEAR	MRX	1.5 km	MPC · JPL
238164	2003 SX_{121}	—	September 17, 2003	Campo Imperatore	CINEOS	·	1.8 km	MPC · JPL
238165	2003 SY_{130}	—	September 19, 2003	Palomar	NEAT	H	790 m	MPC · JPL
238166	2003 SC_{134}	—	September 18, 2003	Palomar	NEAT	·	2.9 km	MPC · JPL
238167	2003 SX_{136}	—	September 20, 2003	Kitt Peak	Spacewatch	·	1.2 km	MPC · JPL
238168	2003 SJ_{141}	—	September 19, 2003	Palomar	NEAT	HNS	1.9 km	MPC · JPL
238169	2003 SN_{148}	—	September 16, 2003	Socorro	LINEAR	EUN	1.6 km	MPC · JPL
238170	2003 SK_{149}	—	September 16, 2003	Kitt Peak	Spacewatch	·	3.8 km	MPC · JPL
238171	2003 SD_{150}	—	September 17, 2003	Socorro	LINEAR	·	1.9 km	MPC · JPL
238172	2003 SH_{168}	—	September 23, 2003	Haleakala	NEAT	·	1.5 km	MPC · JPL
238173	2003 SD_{175}	—	September 18, 2003	Kitt Peak	Spacewatch	·	2.0 km	MPC · JPL
238174	2003 SF_{176}	—	September 18, 2003	Palomar	NEAT	·	1.6 km	MPC · JPL
238175	2003 SG_{203}	—	September 22, 2003	Anderson Mesa	LONEOS	·	1.9 km	MPC · JPL
238176	2003 SS_{211}	—	September 25, 2003	Palomar	NEAT	·	2.1 km	MPC · JPL
238177	2003 SR_{215}	—	September 24, 2003	Socorro	LINEAR	·	4.6 km	MPC · JPL
238178	2003 SP_{217}	—	September 27, 2003	Kitt Peak	Spacewatch	·	2.1 km	MPC · JPL
238179	2003 SR_{219}	—	September 28, 2003	Desert Eagle	W. K. Y. Yeung	ADE	3.4 km	MPC · JPL
238180	2003 SW_{221}	—	September 28, 2003	Desert Eagle	W. K. Y. Yeung	·	2.3 km	MPC · JPL
238181	2003 SO_{237}	—	September 26, 2003	Socorro	LINEAR	fast	2.4 km	MPC · JPL
238182	2003 SW_{249}	—	September 26, 2003	Socorro	LINEAR	·	3.0 km	MPC · JPL
238183	2003 SW_{253}	—	September 27, 2003	Socorro	LINEAR	H	750 m	MPC · JPL
238184	2003 ST_{257}	—	September 28, 2003	Socorro	LINEAR	·	2.5 km	MPC · JPL
238185	2003 SJ_{258}	—	September 28, 2003	Kitt Peak	Spacewatch	NEM	3.0 km	MPC · JPL
238186	2003 SW_{267}	—	September 29, 2003	Kitt Peak	Spacewatch	·	2.5 km	MPC · JPL
238187	2003 SC_{270}	—	September 24, 2003	Haleakala	NEAT	·	3.0 km	MPC · JPL
238188	2003 SU_{279}	—	September 17, 2003	Kitt Peak	Spacewatch	·	3.3 km	MPC · JPL
238189	2003 SH_{287}	—	September 29, 2003	Kitt Peak	Spacewatch	·	1.5 km	MPC · JPL
238190	2003 SU_{293}	—	September 27, 2003	Socorro	LINEAR	·	3.2 km	MPC · JPL
238191	2003 SM_{294}	—	September 28, 2003	Socorro	LINEAR	·	2.5 km	MPC · JPL
238192	2003 SO_{319}	—	September 26, 2003	Apache Point	SDSS	·	1.7 km	MPC · JPL
238193	2003 SB_{321}	—	September 19, 2003	Campo Imperatore	CINEOS	·	2.5 km	MPC · JPL
238194	2003 SZ_{321}	—	September 26, 2003	Apache Point	SDSS	EUN	1.4 km	MPC · JPL
238195	2003 SG_{327}	—	September 18, 2003	Kitt Peak	Spacewatch	WIT	1.2 km	MPC · JPL
238196	2003 SD_{328}	—	September 20, 2003	Anderson Mesa	LONEOS	H	730 m	MPC · JPL
238197	2003 ST_{361}	—	September 22, 2003	Kitt Peak	Spacewatch	·	2.1 km	MPC · JPL
238198	2003 SZ_{396}	—	September 26, 2003	Apache Point	SDSS	·	2.8 km	MPC · JPL
238199	2003 SH_{423}	—	September 19, 2003	Kitt Peak	Spacewatch	·	1.4 km	MPC · JPL
238200	2003 TD_{8}	—	October 1, 2003	Kitt Peak	Spacewatch	·	4.8 km	MPC · JPL

== 238201–238300 ==
back to top

Designation			Discovery			Properties		Ref
Permanent	Provisional	Named after	Date	Site	Discoverer(s)	Category	Diam.	Ref
238201	2003 TE_{17}	—	October 15, 2003	Anderson Mesa	LONEOS	·	3.0 km	MPC · JPL
238202	2003 TB_{56}	—	October 5, 2003	Kitt Peak	Spacewatch	HOF	3.5 km	MPC · JPL
238203	2003 TY_{56}	—	October 5, 2003	Kitt Peak	Spacewatch	WIT	1.3 km	MPC · JPL
238204	2003 TS_{58}	—	October 2, 2003	Kitt Peak	Spacewatch	·	1.5 km	MPC · JPL
238205	2003 UJ_{13}	—	October 20, 2003	Socorro	LINEAR	H	840 m	MPC · JPL
238206	2003 UK_{29}	—	October 23, 2003	Kvistaberg	Uppsala-DLR Asteroid Survey	·	2.5 km	MPC · JPL
238207	2003 UR_{31}	—	October 16, 2003	Kitt Peak	Spacewatch	·	3.1 km	MPC · JPL
238208	2003 UB_{43}	—	October 17, 2003	Kitt Peak	Spacewatch	·	2.2 km	MPC · JPL
238209	2003 UG_{48}	—	October 16, 2003	Anderson Mesa	LONEOS	·	2.6 km	MPC · JPL
238210	2003 UO_{55}	—	October 18, 2003	Palomar	NEAT	·	3.3 km	MPC · JPL
238211	2003 UT_{67}	—	October 16, 2003	Kitt Peak	Spacewatch	·	2.2 km	MPC · JPL
238212	2003 UC_{72}	—	October 19, 2003	Socorro	LINEAR	·	4.1 km	MPC · JPL
238213	2003 UD_{76}	—	October 17, 2003	Kitt Peak	Spacewatch	HOF	3.4 km	MPC · JPL
238214	2003 UZ_{81}	—	October 18, 2003	Haleakala	NEAT	·	7.2 km	MPC · JPL
238215	2003 UP_{86}	—	October 18, 2003	Palomar	NEAT	·	2.2 km	MPC · JPL
238216	2003 UV_{86}	—	October 18, 2003	Palomar	NEAT	·	2.0 km	MPC · JPL
238217	2003 UW_{102}	—	October 20, 2003	Kitt Peak	Spacewatch	·	2.5 km	MPC · JPL
238218	2003 UO_{103}	—	October 20, 2003	Palomar	NEAT	EUN	1.5 km	MPC · JPL
238219	2003 UQ_{110}	—	October 19, 2003	Kitt Peak	Spacewatch	·	4.0 km	MPC · JPL
238220	2003 UE_{112}	—	October 20, 2003	Socorro	LINEAR	·	4.4 km	MPC · JPL
238221	2003 UV_{118}	—	October 17, 2003	Palomar	NEAT	·	4.7 km	MPC · JPL
238222	2003 UJ_{137}	—	October 21, 2003	Socorro	LINEAR	AGN	1.6 km	MPC · JPL
238223	2003 UX_{144}	—	October 18, 2003	Anderson Mesa	LONEOS	·	1.8 km	MPC · JPL
238224	2003 UF_{148}	—	October 19, 2003	Kitt Peak	Spacewatch	·	2.1 km	MPC · JPL
238225	2003 UA_{157}	—	October 20, 2003	Socorro	LINEAR	HNS	1.7 km	MPC · JPL
238226	2003 UP_{161}	—	October 21, 2003	Socorro	LINEAR	GEF	2.1 km	MPC · JPL
238227	2003 UB_{174}	—	October 21, 2003	Kitt Peak	Spacewatch	·	1.6 km	MPC · JPL
238228	2003 UZ_{175}	—	October 21, 2003	Palomar	NEAT	·	3.0 km	MPC · JPL
238229	2003 UU_{178}	—	October 21, 2003	Palomar	NEAT	·	1.5 km	MPC · JPL
238230	2003 UL_{179}	—	October 21, 2003	Socorro	LINEAR	THM	3.9 km	MPC · JPL
238231	2003 UA_{188}	—	October 22, 2003	Socorro	LINEAR	·	3.7 km	MPC · JPL
238232	2003 UC_{198}	—	October 21, 2003	Kitt Peak	Spacewatch	THM	3.1 km	MPC · JPL
238233	2003 UZ_{203}	—	October 21, 2003	Kitt Peak	Spacewatch	·	2.8 km	MPC · JPL
238234	2003 UW_{204}	—	October 22, 2003	Kitt Peak	Spacewatch	·	1.4 km	MPC · JPL
238235	2003 UT_{207}	—	October 22, 2003	Socorro	LINEAR	(5)	4.3 km	MPC · JPL
238236	2003 US_{218}	—	October 21, 2003	Socorro	LINEAR	·	2.9 km	MPC · JPL
238237	2003 UV_{220}	—	October 22, 2003	Kitt Peak	Spacewatch	EUN	2.0 km	MPC · JPL
238238	2003 UA_{223}	—	October 22, 2003	Socorro	LINEAR	H	880 m	MPC · JPL
238239	2003 UQ_{226}	—	October 22, 2003	Kitt Peak	Spacewatch	·	2.4 km	MPC · JPL
238240	2003 UN_{229}	—	October 23, 2003	Anderson Mesa	LONEOS	·	1.8 km	MPC · JPL
238241	2003 UN_{246}	—	October 24, 2003	Socorro	LINEAR	·	2.0 km	MPC · JPL
238242	2003 UD_{251}	—	October 25, 2003	Socorro	LINEAR	·	5.6 km	MPC · JPL
238243	2003 UW_{254}	—	October 25, 2003	Socorro	LINEAR	·	3.8 km	MPC · JPL
238244	2003 UE_{255}	—	October 25, 2003	Kitt Peak	Spacewatch	·	2.2 km	MPC · JPL
238245	2003 UA_{261}	—	October 26, 2003	Kitt Peak	Spacewatch	·	1.9 km	MPC · JPL
238246	2003 UE_{264}	—	October 27, 2003	Socorro	LINEAR	·	1.6 km	MPC · JPL
238247	2003 UQ_{275}	—	October 29, 2003	Socorro	LINEAR	NEM	3.1 km	MPC · JPL
238248	2003 UY_{276}	—	October 30, 2003	Socorro	LINEAR	·	4.4 km	MPC · JPL
238249	2003 UD_{279}	—	October 26, 2003	Kitt Peak	Spacewatch	·	2.3 km	MPC · JPL
238250	2003 UH_{294}	—	October 16, 2003	Kitt Peak	Spacewatch	·	2.4 km	MPC · JPL
238251	2003 UN_{294}	—	October 16, 2003	Palomar	NEAT	·	2.6 km	MPC · JPL
238252	2003 UH_{309}	—	October 19, 2003	Kitt Peak	Spacewatch	·	2.7 km	MPC · JPL
238253	2003 UU_{354}	—	October 19, 2003	Kitt Peak	Spacewatch	·	1.4 km	MPC · JPL
238254	2003 UF_{362}	—	October 20, 2003	Kitt Peak	Spacewatch	·	2.3 km	MPC · JPL
238255	2003 VU_{3}	—	November 15, 2003	Kitt Peak	Spacewatch	(5)	2.1 km	MPC · JPL
238256	2003 VK_{5}	—	November 15, 2003	Kitt Peak	Spacewatch	·	3.1 km	MPC · JPL
238257	2003 WO	—	November 16, 2003	Catalina	CSS	ADE	3.5 km	MPC · JPL
238258	2003 WG_{2}	—	November 16, 2003	Kitt Peak	Spacewatch	·	1.9 km	MPC · JPL
238259	2003 WG_{3}	—	November 16, 2003	Kitt Peak	Spacewatch	·	2.7 km	MPC · JPL
238260	2003 WR_{4}	—	November 16, 2003	Kitt Peak	Spacewatch	·	4.1 km	MPC · JPL
238261	2003 WP_{9}	—	November 18, 2003	Kitt Peak	Spacewatch	·	2.6 km	MPC · JPL
238262	2003 WC_{22}	—	November 19, 2003	Socorro	LINEAR	·	5.2 km	MPC · JPL
238263	2003 WA_{23}	—	November 18, 2003	Kitt Peak	Spacewatch	·	2.4 km	MPC · JPL
238264	2003 WF_{32}	—	November 18, 2003	Kitt Peak	Spacewatch	·	3.3 km	MPC · JPL
238265	2003 WK_{45}	—	November 19, 2003	Palomar	NEAT	·	2.4 km	MPC · JPL
238266	2003 WV_{46}	—	November 18, 2003	Palomar	NEAT	WIT	1.3 km	MPC · JPL
238267	2003 WW_{48}	—	November 19, 2003	Kitt Peak	Spacewatch	·	1.8 km	MPC · JPL
238268	2003 WY_{58}	—	November 18, 2003	Kitt Peak	Spacewatch	·	2.3 km	MPC · JPL
238269	2003 WO_{61}	—	November 19, 2003	Kitt Peak	Spacewatch	·	3.5 km	MPC · JPL
238270	2003 WP_{63}	—	November 19, 2003	Kitt Peak	Spacewatch	(5)	3.8 km	MPC · JPL
238271	2003 WY_{67}	—	November 19, 2003	Kitt Peak	Spacewatch	·	2.5 km	MPC · JPL
238272	2003 WJ_{68}	—	November 19, 2003	Kitt Peak	Spacewatch	·	3.2 km	MPC · JPL
238273	2003 WY_{71}	—	November 20, 2003	Socorro	LINEAR	·	3.2 km	MPC · JPL
238274	2003 WU_{79}	—	November 20, 2003	Socorro	LINEAR	·	2.8 km	MPC · JPL
238275	2003 WG_{82}	—	November 19, 2003	Palomar	NEAT	·	3.4 km	MPC · JPL
238276	2003 WF_{89}	—	November 16, 2003	Catalina	CSS	AGN	1.7 km	MPC · JPL
238277	2003 WP_{94}	—	November 19, 2003	Anderson Mesa	LONEOS	·	2.8 km	MPC · JPL
238278	2003 WH_{96}	—	November 19, 2003	Anderson Mesa	LONEOS	·	2.5 km	MPC · JPL
238279	2003 WS_{99}	—	November 20, 2003	Socorro	LINEAR	·	4.0 km	MPC · JPL
238280	2003 WO_{106}	—	November 21, 2003	Socorro	LINEAR	EUP	6.0 km	MPC · JPL
238281	2003 WX_{113}	—	November 20, 2003	Socorro	LINEAR	AGN	1.8 km	MPC · JPL
238282	2003 WP_{116}	—	November 20, 2003	Socorro	LINEAR	·	3.9 km	MPC · JPL
238283	2003 WF_{127}	—	November 20, 2003	Socorro	LINEAR	EUP	6.5 km	MPC · JPL
238284	2003 WK_{127}	—	November 20, 2003	Socorro	LINEAR	H	1.1 km	MPC · JPL
238285	2003 WF_{129}	—	November 21, 2003	Socorro	LINEAR	·	2.5 km	MPC · JPL
238286	2003 WE_{140}	—	November 21, 2003	Socorro	LINEAR	·	3.0 km	MPC · JPL
238287	2003 WF_{144}	—	November 21, 2003	Socorro	LINEAR	·	3.1 km	MPC · JPL
238288	2003 WS_{145}	—	November 21, 2003	Socorro	LINEAR	·	2.3 km	MPC · JPL
238289	2003 WB_{148}	—	November 23, 2003	Kitt Peak	Spacewatch	·	3.0 km	MPC · JPL
238290	2003 WC_{150}	—	November 24, 2003	Anderson Mesa	LONEOS	·	3.5 km	MPC · JPL
238291	2003 WO_{150}	—	November 24, 2003	Anderson Mesa	LONEOS	·	4.1 km	MPC · JPL
238292	2003 WK_{154}	—	November 26, 2003	Kitt Peak	Spacewatch	·	4.0 km	MPC · JPL
238293	2003 WO_{155}	—	November 26, 2003	Kitt Peak	Spacewatch	·	5.0 km	MPC · JPL
238294	2003 WG_{158}	—	November 28, 2003	Kitt Peak	Spacewatch	NEM	2.6 km	MPC · JPL
238295	2003 WA_{160}	—	November 30, 2003	Kitt Peak	Spacewatch	·	2.2 km	MPC · JPL
238296	2003 WM_{161}	—	November 30, 2003	Kitt Peak	Spacewatch	·	2.8 km	MPC · JPL
238297	2003 WY_{165}	—	November 30, 2003	Kitt Peak	Spacewatch	·	3.6 km	MPC · JPL
238298	2003 WZ_{175}	—	November 19, 2003	Kitt Peak	Spacewatch	·	1.9 km	MPC · JPL
238299	2003 XE_{8}	—	December 4, 2003	Socorro	LINEAR	·	6.3 km	MPC · JPL
238300	2003 XT_{14}	—	December 13, 2003	Socorro	LINEAR	·	2.9 km	MPC · JPL

== 238301–238400 ==
back to top

Designation			Discovery			Properties		Ref
Permanent	Provisional	Named after	Date	Site	Discoverer(s)	Category	Diam.	Ref
238301	2003 XQ_{15}	—	December 3, 2003	Socorro	LINEAR	·	4.7 km	MPC · JPL
238302	2003 XD_{20}	—	December 14, 2003	Kitt Peak	Spacewatch	·	3.7 km	MPC · JPL
238303	2003 XY_{22}	—	December 1, 2003	Kitt Peak	Spacewatch	·	4.6 km	MPC · JPL
238304	2003 XZ_{24}	—	December 1, 2003	Socorro	LINEAR	·	3.6 km	MPC · JPL
238305	2003 XW_{27}	—	December 1, 2003	Kitt Peak	Spacewatch	·	4.6 km	MPC · JPL
238306	2003 XH_{30}	—	December 1, 2003	Kitt Peak	Spacewatch	AGN	1.3 km	MPC · JPL
238307	2003 YQ_{3}	—	December 18, 2003	Socorro	LINEAR	H	870 m	MPC · JPL
238308	2003 YQ_{14}	—	December 17, 2003	Socorro	LINEAR	·	3.4 km	MPC · JPL
238309	2003 YJ_{21}	—	December 17, 2003	Kitt Peak	Spacewatch	EUP	6.3 km	MPC · JPL
238310	2003 YH_{23}	—	December 17, 2003	Kitt Peak	Spacewatch	·	2.5 km	MPC · JPL
238311	2003 YV_{38}	—	December 19, 2003	Kitt Peak	Spacewatch	·	5.7 km	MPC · JPL
238312	2003 YB_{40}	—	December 19, 2003	Kitt Peak	Spacewatch	·	2.1 km	MPC · JPL
238313	2003 YG_{53}	—	December 19, 2003	Socorro	LINEAR	·	1.6 km	MPC · JPL
238314	2003 YO_{59}	—	December 19, 2003	Socorro	LINEAR	·	3.1 km	MPC · JPL
238315	2003 YZ_{69}	—	December 21, 2003	Socorro	LINEAR	EOS	3.1 km	MPC · JPL
238316	2003 YB_{82}	—	December 18, 2003	Socorro	LINEAR	·	3.7 km	MPC · JPL
238317	2003 YT_{99}	—	December 19, 2003	Socorro	LINEAR	·	4.6 km	MPC · JPL
238318	2003 YW_{126}	—	December 27, 2003	Socorro	LINEAR	LUT	6.8 km	MPC · JPL
238319	2003 YH_{131}	—	December 28, 2003	Socorro	LINEAR	·	2.2 km	MPC · JPL
238320	2003 YX_{131}	—	December 28, 2003	Socorro	LINEAR	EOS	2.5 km	MPC · JPL
238321	2003 YP_{140}	—	December 28, 2003	Socorro	LINEAR	EUN	2.4 km	MPC · JPL
238322	2003 YU_{151}	—	December 29, 2003	Socorro	LINEAR	·	3.1 km	MPC · JPL
238323	2003 YU_{153}	—	December 29, 2003	Catalina	CSS	·	3.7 km	MPC · JPL
238324	2003 YH_{164}	—	December 17, 2003	Kitt Peak	Spacewatch	KOR	1.8 km	MPC · JPL
238325	2003 YN_{173}	—	December 19, 2003	Kitt Peak	Spacewatch	·	2.3 km	MPC · JPL
238326	2004 AG_{5}	—	January 13, 2004	Anderson Mesa	LONEOS	·	3.6 km	MPC · JPL
238327	2004 AV_{16}	—	January 15, 2004	Kitt Peak	Spacewatch	·	2.3 km	MPC · JPL
238328	2004 AB_{17}	—	January 15, 2004	Kitt Peak	Spacewatch	·	4.0 km	MPC · JPL
238329	2004 BS_{4}	—	January 16, 2004	Palomar	NEAT	·	3.6 km	MPC · JPL
238330	2004 BA_{5}	—	January 16, 2004	Palomar	NEAT	·	3.8 km	MPC · JPL
238331	2004 BW_{16}	—	January 16, 2004	Catalina	CSS	LIX	3.9 km	MPC · JPL
238332	2004 BO_{17}	—	January 18, 2004	Palomar	NEAT	·	2.9 km	MPC · JPL
238333	2004 BB_{21}	—	January 16, 2004	Kitt Peak	Spacewatch	·	2.5 km	MPC · JPL
238334	2004 BE_{37}	—	January 19, 2004	Kitt Peak	Spacewatch	THM	2.3 km	MPC · JPL
238335	2004 BF_{46}	—	January 21, 2004	Socorro	LINEAR	·	3.7 km	MPC · JPL
238336	2004 BA_{57}	—	January 23, 2004	Socorro	LINEAR	·	2.5 km	MPC · JPL
238337	2004 BG_{58}	—	January 23, 2004	Socorro	LINEAR	·	5.3 km	MPC · JPL
238338	2004 BP_{59}	—	January 24, 2004	Socorro	LINEAR	EMA	4.8 km	MPC · JPL
238339	2004 BK_{70}	—	January 22, 2004	Socorro	LINEAR	EOS	2.7 km	MPC · JPL
238340	2004 BC_{79}	—	January 22, 2004	Socorro	LINEAR	·	3.0 km	MPC · JPL
238341	2004 BA_{81}	—	January 26, 2004	Anderson Mesa	LONEOS	·	3.5 km	MPC · JPL
238342	2004 BZ_{86}	—	January 22, 2004	Socorro	LINEAR	THM	5.1 km	MPC · JPL
238343	2004 BJ_{87}	—	January 23, 2004	Anderson Mesa	LONEOS	·	4.8 km	MPC · JPL
238344	2004 BL_{103}	—	January 31, 2004	Socorro	LINEAR	T_{j} (2.97)	5.1 km	MPC · JPL
238345	2004 BS_{106}	—	January 26, 2004	Anderson Mesa	LONEOS	LIX	5.0 km	MPC · JPL
238346	2004 BW_{108}	—	January 28, 2004	Catalina	CSS	LIX	5.7 km	MPC · JPL
238347	2004 BM_{109}	—	January 28, 2004	Catalina	CSS	·	3.9 km	MPC · JPL
238348	2004 BP_{109}	—	January 28, 2004	Catalina	CSS	LIX	5.1 km	MPC · JPL
238349	2004 BG_{111}	—	January 29, 2004	Catalina	CSS	T_{j} (2.92)	6.5 km	MPC · JPL
238350	2004 BQ_{113}	—	January 28, 2004	Catalina	CSS	·	5.3 km	MPC · JPL
238351	2004 BP_{116}	—	January 27, 2004	Catalina	CSS	·	3.5 km	MPC · JPL
238352	2004 BH_{118}	—	January 29, 2004	Socorro	LINEAR	EUP	5.1 km	MPC · JPL
238353	2004 BF_{122}	—	January 30, 2004	Catalina	CSS	·	5.5 km	MPC · JPL
238354	2004 BF_{132}	—	January 17, 2004	Palomar	NEAT	·	5.7 km	MPC · JPL
238355	2004 BF_{162}	—	January 17, 2004	Palomar	NEAT	TIR	2.8 km	MPC · JPL
238356	2004 CC_{4}	—	February 10, 2004	Palomar	NEAT	EOS	2.9 km	MPC · JPL
238357	2004 CK_{5}	—	February 10, 2004	Palomar	NEAT	EOS	2.9 km	MPC · JPL
238358	2004 CP_{7}	—	February 10, 2004	Catalina	CSS	·	4.2 km	MPC · JPL
238359	2004 CJ_{9}	—	February 11, 2004	Kitt Peak	Spacewatch	·	2.1 km	MPC · JPL
238360	2004 CO_{24}	—	February 12, 2004	Kitt Peak	Spacewatch	·	2.7 km	MPC · JPL
238361	2004 CV_{39}	—	February 12, 2004	Desert Eagle	W. K. Y. Yeung	·	5.8 km	MPC · JPL
238362	2004 CF_{43}	—	February 11, 2004	Palomar	NEAT	·	3.0 km	MPC · JPL
238363	2004 CG_{43}	—	February 11, 2004	Palomar	NEAT	·	2.6 km	MPC · JPL
238364	2004 CP_{46}	—	February 13, 2004	Kitt Peak	Spacewatch	·	2.2 km	MPC · JPL
238365	2004 CE_{52}	—	February 14, 2004	Socorro	LINEAR	T_{j} (2.94)	3.4 km	MPC · JPL
238366	2004 CT_{57}	—	February 13, 2004	Palomar	NEAT	·	6.1 km	MPC · JPL
238367	2004 CK_{58}	—	February 10, 2004	Catalina	CSS	·	3.8 km	MPC · JPL
238368	2004 CP_{59}	—	February 10, 2004	Palomar	NEAT	EUP	5.8 km	MPC · JPL
238369	2004 CR_{59}	—	February 10, 2004	Palomar	NEAT	·	3.8 km	MPC · JPL
238370	2004 CO_{60}	—	February 11, 2004	Palomar	NEAT	·	3.4 km	MPC · JPL
238371	2004 CH_{63}	—	February 12, 2004	Palomar	NEAT	·	4.7 km	MPC · JPL
238372	2004 CP_{65}	—	February 14, 2004	Haleakala	NEAT	·	4.4 km	MPC · JPL
238373	2004 CL_{67}	—	February 10, 2004	Palomar	NEAT	·	4.1 km	MPC · JPL
238374	2004 CR_{67}	—	February 10, 2004	Palomar	NEAT	·	2.8 km	MPC · JPL
238375	2004 CP_{70}	—	February 12, 2004	Kitt Peak	Spacewatch	·	3.0 km	MPC · JPL
238376	2004 CN_{86}	—	February 14, 2004	Kitt Peak	Spacewatch	·	3.8 km	MPC · JPL
238377	2004 CL_{93}	—	February 11, 2004	Palomar	NEAT	·	3.8 km	MPC · JPL
238378	2004 CN_{98}	—	February 14, 2004	Catalina	CSS	·	4.2 km	MPC · JPL
238379	2004 CV_{100}	—	February 15, 2004	Catalina	CSS	TIR	4.9 km	MPC · JPL
238380	2004 CA_{103}	—	February 12, 2004	Palomar	NEAT	·	4.4 km	MPC · JPL
238381	2004 CG_{106}	—	February 14, 2004	Palomar	NEAT	·	5.6 km	MPC · JPL
238382	2004 CZ_{108}	—	February 15, 2004	Catalina	CSS	·	5.6 km	MPC · JPL
238383	2004 CO_{114}	—	February 11, 2004	Socorro	LINEAR	EUP	6.2 km	MPC · JPL
238384	2004 CR_{125}	—	February 12, 2004	Kitt Peak	Spacewatch	·	2.7 km	MPC · JPL
238385	2004 DK_{13}	—	February 16, 2004	Catalina	CSS	TIR	4.4 km	MPC · JPL
238386	2004 DS_{35}	—	February 19, 2004	Socorro	LINEAR	(1298)	4.3 km	MPC · JPL
238387	2004 DF_{50}	—	February 22, 2004	Kitt Peak	Spacewatch	EOS	2.7 km	MPC · JPL
238388	2004 DZ_{51}	—	February 23, 2004	Socorro	LINEAR	·	4.1 km	MPC · JPL
238389	2004 DA_{55}	—	February 22, 2004	Kitt Peak	Spacewatch	THM	2.2 km	MPC · JPL
238390	2004 DW_{78}	—	February 21, 2004	Haleakala	NEAT	·	4.4 km	MPC · JPL
238391	2004 DO_{79}	—	February 16, 2004	Catalina	CSS	·	3.5 km	MPC · JPL
238392	2004 DU_{79}	—	February 22, 2004	Kitt Peak	Spacewatch	VER	4.1 km	MPC · JPL
238393	2004 ET_{2}	—	March 9, 2004	Palomar	NEAT	·	2.9 km	MPC · JPL
238394	2004 ET_{3}	—	March 10, 2004	Palomar	NEAT	·	5.3 km	MPC · JPL
238395	2004 EP_{5}	—	March 11, 2004	Palomar	NEAT	EOS	2.6 km	MPC · JPL
238396	2004 EG_{9}	—	March 10, 2004	Socorro	LINEAR	EUP	5.0 km	MPC · JPL
238397	2004 EJ_{9}	—	March 14, 2004	Socorro	LINEAR	EUP	4.6 km	MPC · JPL
238398	2004 EL_{9}	—	March 14, 2004	Socorro	LINEAR	·	6.3 km	MPC · JPL
238399	2004 EJ_{12}	—	March 11, 2004	Palomar	NEAT	THM	3.7 km	MPC · JPL
238400	2004 EJ_{15}	—	March 11, 2004	Palomar	NEAT	·	4.9 km	MPC · JPL

== 238401–238500 ==
back to top

Designation			Discovery			Properties		Ref
Permanent	Provisional	Named after	Date	Site	Discoverer(s)	Category	Diam.	Ref
238401	2004 EG_{18}	—	March 12, 2004	Palomar	NEAT	·	2.5 km	MPC · JPL
238402	2004 EO_{26}	—	March 14, 2004	Kitt Peak	Spacewatch	VER	4.2 km	MPC · JPL
238403	2004 EW_{39}	—	March 15, 2004	Catalina	CSS	·	5.1 km	MPC · JPL
238404	2004 EC_{47}	—	March 15, 2004	Kitt Peak	Spacewatch	·	3.9 km	MPC · JPL
238405	2004 EA_{52}	—	March 15, 2004	Kitt Peak	Spacewatch	·	3.1 km	MPC · JPL
238406	2004 ED_{59}	—	March 15, 2004	Kitt Peak	Spacewatch	·	3.5 km	MPC · JPL
238407	2004 EE_{65}	—	March 14, 2004	Socorro	LINEAR	TIR	3.0 km	MPC · JPL
238408	2004 EJ_{65}	—	March 14, 2004	Socorro	LINEAR	·	7.3 km	MPC · JPL
238409	2004 EN_{65}	—	March 14, 2004	Socorro	LINEAR	·	5.5 km	MPC · JPL
238410	2004 EO_{65}	—	March 14, 2004	Socorro	LINEAR	·	5.5 km	MPC · JPL
238411	2004 ET_{74}	—	March 13, 2004	Palomar	NEAT	·	5.8 km	MPC · JPL
238412	2004 EY_{93}	—	March 15, 2004	Socorro	LINEAR	·	6.4 km	MPC · JPL
238413	2004 EM_{112}	—	March 15, 2004	Kitt Peak	Spacewatch	·	3.0 km	MPC · JPL
238414	2004 FF_{2}	—	March 16, 2004	Goodricke-Pigott	R. A. Tucker	·	3.9 km	MPC · JPL
238415	2004 FQ_{7}	—	March 16, 2004	Socorro	LINEAR	·	4.4 km	MPC · JPL
238416	2004 FZ_{8}	—	March 16, 2004	Socorro	LINEAR	·	4.1 km	MPC · JPL
238417	2004 FS_{19}	—	March 16, 2004	Kitt Peak	Spacewatch	EOS	2.6 km	MPC · JPL
238418	2004 FM_{36}	—	March 16, 2004	Socorro	LINEAR	HYG	6.0 km	MPC · JPL
238419	2004 FX_{52}	—	March 19, 2004	Socorro	LINEAR	·	4.5 km	MPC · JPL
238420	2004 FJ_{53}	—	March 17, 2004	Kitt Peak	Spacewatch	·	2.2 km	MPC · JPL
238421	2004 FN_{84}	—	March 18, 2004	Catalina	CSS	LIX	4.9 km	MPC · JPL
238422	2004 FN_{96}	—	March 23, 2004	Socorro	LINEAR	·	3.3 km	MPC · JPL
238423	2004 FW_{155}	—	March 17, 2004	Kitt Peak	Spacewatch	THM	3.0 km	MPC · JPL
238424	2004 GU_{3}	—	April 10, 2004	Catalina	CSS	·	4.3 km	MPC · JPL
238425	2004 GM_{5}	—	April 11, 2004	Palomar	NEAT	EOS	5.2 km	MPC · JPL
238426	2004 GX_{15}	—	April 9, 2004	Siding Spring	SSS	VER	4.4 km	MPC · JPL
238427	2004 GZ_{36}	—	April 14, 2004	Anderson Mesa	LONEOS	·	6.2 km	MPC · JPL
238428	2004 GW_{78}	—	April 11, 2004	Palomar	NEAT	·	4.3 km	MPC · JPL
238429	2004 HM_{20}	—	April 22, 2004	Desert Eagle	W. K. Y. Yeung	·	3.6 km	MPC · JPL
238430	2004 HM_{63}	—	April 21, 2004	Kitt Peak	Spacewatch	·	5.9 km	MPC · JPL
238431	2004 JU_{8}	—	May 13, 2004	Kitt Peak	Spacewatch	CYB	5.4 km	MPC · JPL
238432	2004 LZ_{8}	—	June 12, 2004	Catalina	CSS	PHO	2.1 km	MPC · JPL
238433	2004 NP_{23}	—	July 14, 2004	Socorro	LINEAR	·	910 m	MPC · JPL
238434	2004 OG_{2}	—	July 16, 2004	Socorro	LINEAR	V	890 m	MPC · JPL
238435	2004 OU_{13}	—	July 22, 2004	Mauna Kea	Veillet, C.	·	990 m	MPC · JPL
238436	2004 PZ_{7}	—	August 6, 2004	Palomar	NEAT	·	960 m	MPC · JPL
238437	2004 PS_{25}	—	August 8, 2004	Socorro	LINEAR	·	1.2 km	MPC · JPL
238438	2004 PQ_{29}	—	August 7, 2004	Palomar	NEAT	·	800 m	MPC · JPL
238439	2004 PD_{32}	—	August 8, 2004	Socorro	LINEAR	·	1.6 km	MPC · JPL
238440	2004 PV_{35}	—	August 8, 2004	Anderson Mesa	LONEOS	PHO	1.9 km	MPC · JPL
238441	2004 PK_{47}	—	August 8, 2004	Socorro	LINEAR	·	1.5 km	MPC · JPL
238442	2004 PE_{50}	—	August 8, 2004	Socorro	LINEAR	V	890 m	MPC · JPL
238443	2004 PC_{52}	—	August 8, 2004	Socorro	LINEAR	·	3.3 km	MPC · JPL
238444	2004 PF_{58}	—	August 9, 2004	Socorro	LINEAR	·	830 m	MPC · JPL
238445	2004 PU_{61}	—	August 9, 2004	Socorro	LINEAR	·	2.3 km	MPC · JPL
238446	2004 PU_{65}	—	August 10, 2004	Anderson Mesa	LONEOS	·	960 m	MPC · JPL
238447	2004 PV_{73}	—	August 8, 2004	Socorro	LINEAR	·	1.2 km	MPC · JPL
238448	2004 PN_{75}	—	August 8, 2004	Anderson Mesa	LONEOS	·	1.5 km	MPC · JPL
238449	2004 PP_{80}	—	August 9, 2004	Socorro	LINEAR	V	950 m	MPC · JPL
238450	2004 PK_{100}	—	August 12, 2004	Socorro	LINEAR	·	1.8 km	MPC · JPL
238451	2004 PA_{103}	—	August 12, 2004	Socorro	LINEAR	·	2.9 km	MPC · JPL
238452	2004 PZ_{105}	—	August 15, 2004	Siding Spring	SSS	·	2.4 km	MPC · JPL
238453	2004 QF	—	August 16, 2004	Palomar	NEAT	·	960 m	MPC · JPL
238454	2004 QW_{9}	—	August 21, 2004	Siding Spring	SSS	·	880 m	MPC · JPL
238455	2004 QS_{26}	—	August 23, 2004	Kitt Peak	Spacewatch	·	1.4 km	MPC · JPL
238456	2004 RK	—	September 3, 2004	Anderson Mesa	LONEOS	APO	330 m	MPC · JPL
238457	2004 RL_{7}	—	September 6, 2004	Socorro	LINEAR	PHO	2.3 km	MPC · JPL
238458	2004 RD_{14}	—	September 6, 2004	Siding Spring	SSS	ADE	3.9 km	MPC · JPL
238459	2004 RC_{28}	—	September 6, 2004	Siding Spring	SSS	·	1.1 km	MPC · JPL
238460	2004 RF_{32}	—	September 7, 2004	Socorro	LINEAR	·	1.2 km	MPC · JPL
238461	2004 RV_{40}	—	September 7, 2004	Kitt Peak	Spacewatch	MAS	880 m	MPC · JPL
238462	2004 RR_{45}	—	September 8, 2004	Socorro	LINEAR	·	2.0 km	MPC · JPL
238463	2004 RV_{50}	—	September 8, 2004	Socorro	LINEAR	·	850 m	MPC · JPL
238464	2004 RH_{52}	—	September 8, 2004	Socorro	LINEAR	·	2.6 km	MPC · JPL
238465	2004 RW_{62}	—	September 8, 2004	Socorro	LINEAR	V	960 m	MPC · JPL
238466	2004 RE_{63}	—	September 8, 2004	Socorro	LINEAR	·	1.1 km	MPC · JPL
238467	2004 RM_{63}	—	September 8, 2004	Socorro	LINEAR	·	1.6 km	MPC · JPL
238468	2004 RA_{64}	—	September 8, 2004	Socorro	LINEAR	·	900 m	MPC · JPL
238469	2004 RD_{64}	—	September 8, 2004	Socorro	LINEAR	·	1.2 km	MPC · JPL
238470	2004 RF_{65}	—	September 8, 2004	Socorro	LINEAR	V	1.1 km	MPC · JPL
238471	2004 RC_{68}	—	September 8, 2004	Socorro	LINEAR	V	1.2 km	MPC · JPL
238472	2004 RH_{73}	—	September 8, 2004	Socorro	LINEAR	MAS	990 m	MPC · JPL
238473	2004 RN_{76}	—	September 8, 2004	Socorro	LINEAR	·	2.8 km	MPC · JPL
238474	2004 RO_{76}	—	September 8, 2004	Socorro	LINEAR	·	880 m	MPC · JPL
238475	2004 RT_{86}	—	September 7, 2004	Socorro	LINEAR	·	1.6 km	MPC · JPL
238476	2004 RP_{103}	—	September 8, 2004	Socorro	LINEAR	·	1.7 km	MPC · JPL
238477	2004 RQ_{103}	—	September 8, 2004	Palomar	NEAT	·	1.4 km	MPC · JPL
238478	2004 RR_{104}	—	September 8, 2004	Palomar	NEAT	V	1.2 km	MPC · JPL
238479	2004 RL_{153}	—	September 10, 2004	Socorro	LINEAR	ADE	3.0 km	MPC · JPL
238480	2004 RC_{157}	—	September 10, 2004	Socorro	LINEAR	·	2.2 km	MPC · JPL
238481	2004 RP_{173}	—	September 9, 2004	Kitt Peak	Spacewatch	·	900 m	MPC · JPL
238482	2004 RF_{183}	—	September 10, 2004	Socorro	LINEAR	·	1.1 km	MPC · JPL
238483	2004 RA_{192}	—	September 10, 2004	Socorro	LINEAR	·	1.2 km	MPC · JPL
238484	2004 RX_{222}	—	September 7, 2004	Socorro	LINEAR	·	1.6 km	MPC · JPL
238485	2004 RP_{229}	—	September 9, 2004	Kitt Peak	Spacewatch	·	1.7 km	MPC · JPL
238486	2004 RU_{231}	—	September 9, 2004	Kitt Peak	Spacewatch	V	950 m	MPC · JPL
238487	2004 RT_{243}	—	September 10, 2004	Kitt Peak	Spacewatch	ERI	2.0 km	MPC · JPL
238488	2004 RU_{257}	—	September 9, 2004	Anderson Mesa	LONEOS	·	1.0 km	MPC · JPL
238489	2004 RU_{272}	—	September 11, 2004	Kitt Peak	Spacewatch	·	1.4 km	MPC · JPL
238490	2004 RT_{281}	—	September 15, 2004	Kitt Peak	Spacewatch	·	1.8 km	MPC · JPL
238491	2004 RC_{285}	—	September 15, 2004	Kitt Peak	Spacewatch	·	1.3 km	MPC · JPL
238492	2004 RR_{310}	—	September 13, 2004	Palomar	NEAT	V	940 m	MPC · JPL
238493	2004 RX_{313}	—	September 15, 2004	Kitt Peak	Spacewatch	SUL	2.4 km	MPC · JPL
238494	2004 RY_{337}	—	September 15, 2004	Kitt Peak	Spacewatch	·	1.1 km	MPC · JPL
238495	2004 RH_{338}	—	September 15, 2004	Kitt Peak	Spacewatch	·	1.5 km	MPC · JPL
238496	2004 RZ_{345}	—	September 9, 2004	Socorro	LINEAR	·	940 m	MPC · JPL
238497	2004 SG_{25}	—	September 21, 2004	Kitt Peak	Spacewatch	·	1.1 km	MPC · JPL
238498	2004 SQ_{28}	—	September 17, 2004	Socorro	LINEAR	·	880 m	MPC · JPL
238499	2004 SA_{30}	—	September 17, 2004	Socorro	LINEAR	V	1.2 km	MPC · JPL
238500	2004 SM_{33}	—	September 17, 2004	Socorro	LINEAR	·	1.2 km	MPC · JPL

== 238501–238600 ==
back to top

Designation			Discovery			Properties		Ref
Permanent	Provisional	Named after	Date	Site	Discoverer(s)	Category	Diam.	Ref
238501	2004 SS_{52}	—	September 21, 2004	Socorro	LINEAR	·	1.7 km	MPC · JPL
238502	2004 SB_{54}	—	September 22, 2004	Socorro	LINEAR	·	1.4 km	MPC · JPL
238503	2004 SF_{54}	—	September 22, 2004	Socorro	LINEAR	·	990 m	MPC · JPL
238504	2004 SG_{58}	—	September 16, 2004	Anderson Mesa	LONEOS	·	2.0 km	MPC · JPL
238505	2004 TK_{5}	—	October 4, 2004	Kitt Peak	Spacewatch	·	3.3 km	MPC · JPL
238506	2004 TH_{8}	—	October 5, 2004	Anderson Mesa	LONEOS	·	2.1 km	MPC · JPL
238507	2004 TW_{12}	—	October 7, 2004	Goodricke-Pigott	R. A. Tucker	V	900 m	MPC · JPL
238508	2004 TO_{46}	—	October 4, 2004	Kitt Peak	Spacewatch	·	920 m	MPC · JPL
238509	2004 TH_{52}	—	October 4, 2004	Kitt Peak	Spacewatch	GEF	2.0 km	MPC · JPL
238510	2004 TH_{55}	—	October 4, 2004	Kitt Peak	Spacewatch	·	1.2 km	MPC · JPL
238511	2004 TJ_{68}	—	October 5, 2004	Anderson Mesa	LONEOS	·	1.9 km	MPC · JPL
238512	2004 TF_{70}	—	October 5, 2004	Palomar	NEAT	·	2.0 km	MPC · JPL
238513	2004 TU_{88}	—	October 5, 2004	Kitt Peak	Spacewatch	V	800 m	MPC · JPL
238514	2004 TV_{98}	—	October 5, 2004	Kitt Peak	Spacewatch	·	970 m	MPC · JPL
238515	2004 TN_{108}	—	October 7, 2004	Socorro	LINEAR	·	880 m	MPC · JPL
238516	2004 TM_{109}	—	October 7, 2004	Socorro	LINEAR	·	1.3 km	MPC · JPL
238517	2004 TN_{113}	—	October 7, 2004	Palomar	NEAT	·	1.1 km	MPC · JPL
238518	2004 TC_{121}	—	October 7, 2004	Anderson Mesa	LONEOS	·	1.0 km	MPC · JPL
238519	2004 TC_{133}	—	October 7, 2004	Anderson Mesa	LONEOS	·	1.5 km	MPC · JPL
238520	2004 TZ_{144}	—	October 4, 2004	Kitt Peak	Spacewatch	·	2.0 km	MPC · JPL
238521	2004 TF_{151}	—	October 6, 2004	Kitt Peak	Spacewatch	·	1.5 km	MPC · JPL
238522	2004 TZ_{163}	—	October 6, 2004	Kitt Peak	Spacewatch	·	1.1 km	MPC · JPL
238523	2004 TV_{169}	—	October 7, 2004	Socorro	LINEAR	·	2.6 km	MPC · JPL
238524	2004 TV_{173}	—	October 8, 2004	Socorro	LINEAR	·	3.5 km	MPC · JPL
238525	2004 TL_{185}	—	October 7, 2004	Kitt Peak	Spacewatch	·	1.6 km	MPC · JPL
238526	2004 TE_{187}	—	October 7, 2004	Kitt Peak	Spacewatch	·	1.3 km	MPC · JPL
238527	2004 TN_{220}	—	October 6, 2004	Socorro	LINEAR	PHO	4.6 km	MPC · JPL
238528	2004 TH_{240}	—	October 10, 2004	Socorro	LINEAR	·	1.6 km	MPC · JPL
238529	2004 TR_{262}	—	October 9, 2004	Socorro	LINEAR	·	3.8 km	MPC · JPL
238530	2004 TM_{275}	—	October 9, 2004	Kitt Peak	Spacewatch	·	1.0 km	MPC · JPL
238531	2004 TL_{278}	—	October 9, 2004	Kitt Peak	Spacewatch	(2076)	1.7 km	MPC · JPL
238532	2004 TJ_{281}	—	October 11, 2004	Kitt Peak	Spacewatch	·	1.2 km	MPC · JPL
238533	2004 TM_{321}	—	October 11, 2004	Kitt Peak	Spacewatch	·	1.3 km	MPC · JPL
238534	2004 TH_{332}	—	October 9, 2004	Kitt Peak	Spacewatch	·	1.2 km	MPC · JPL
238535	2004 TQ_{334}	—	October 10, 2004	Kitt Peak	Spacewatch	·	1.0 km	MPC · JPL
238536	2004 VH_{6}	—	November 3, 2004	Kitt Peak	Spacewatch	·	1.5 km	MPC · JPL
238537	2004 VY_{8}	—	November 3, 2004	Catalina	CSS	·	1.5 km	MPC · JPL
238538	2004 VU_{12}	—	November 3, 2004	Palomar	NEAT	·	1.6 km	MPC · JPL
238539	2004 VD_{19}	—	November 4, 2004	Kitt Peak	Spacewatch	·	2.9 km	MPC · JPL
238540	2004 VM_{21}	—	November 4, 2004	Catalina	CSS	(5)	1.4 km	MPC · JPL
238541	2004 VV_{24}	—	November 4, 2004	Anderson Mesa	LONEOS	(5)	1.7 km	MPC · JPL
238542	2004 VT_{27}	—	November 5, 2004	Palomar	NEAT	PHO	1.8 km	MPC · JPL
238543	2004 VK_{36}	—	November 4, 2004	Kitt Peak	Spacewatch	PAD	3.3 km	MPC · JPL
238544	2004 VT_{48}	—	November 4, 2004	Kitt Peak	Spacewatch	·	1.7 km	MPC · JPL
238545	2004 VS_{62}	—	November 6, 2004	Socorro	LINEAR	·	3.3 km	MPC · JPL
238546	2004 VK_{65}	—	November 13, 2004	Great Shefford	Birtwhistle, P.	·	950 m	MPC · JPL
238547	2004 VL_{70}	—	November 4, 2004	Catalina	CSS	(5)	1.7 km	MPC · JPL
238548	2004 VV_{70}	—	November 7, 2004	Socorro	LINEAR	·	3.4 km	MPC · JPL
238549	2004 VB_{75}	—	November 12, 2004	Catalina	CSS	·	1.8 km	MPC · JPL
238550	2004 VP_{75}	—	November 4, 2004	Kitt Peak	Spacewatch	·	1.2 km	MPC · JPL
238551	2004 VW_{96}	—	November 11, 2004	Kitt Peak	Spacewatch	·	1.7 km	MPC · JPL
238552	2004 WS_{7}	—	November 19, 2004	Catalina	CSS	·	2.0 km	MPC · JPL
238553	2004 XX_{4}	—	December 2, 2004	Catalina	CSS	(5)	1.5 km	MPC · JPL
238554	2004 XK_{13}	—	December 8, 2004	Socorro	LINEAR	·	3.7 km	MPC · JPL
238555	2004 XL_{15}	—	December 8, 2004	Socorro	LINEAR	·	3.0 km	MPC · JPL
238556	2004 XN_{21}	—	December 8, 2004	Socorro	LINEAR	·	3.3 km	MPC · JPL
238557	2004 XK_{26}	—	December 9, 2004	Kitt Peak	Spacewatch	·	3.2 km	MPC · JPL
238558	2004 XH_{27}	—	December 10, 2004	Socorro	LINEAR	·	1.6 km	MPC · JPL
238559	2004 XX_{28}	—	December 10, 2004	Socorro	LINEAR	·	2.2 km	MPC · JPL
238560	2004 XO_{44}	—	December 2, 2004	Socorro	LINEAR	3:2 · SHU	8.7 km	MPC · JPL
238561	2004 XP_{51}	—	December 10, 2004	Socorro	LINEAR	·	3.9 km	MPC · JPL
238562	2004 XX_{53}	—	December 10, 2004	Kitt Peak	Spacewatch	·	2.4 km	MPC · JPL
238563	2004 XN_{60}	—	December 12, 2004	Kitt Peak	Spacewatch	·	1.5 km	MPC · JPL
238564	2004 XP_{64}	—	December 2, 2004	Kitt Peak	Spacewatch	·	2.5 km	MPC · JPL
238565	2004 XQ_{74}	—	December 8, 2004	Socorro	LINEAR	·	4.0 km	MPC · JPL
238566	2004 XD_{75}	—	December 9, 2004	Kitt Peak	Spacewatch	·	1.6 km	MPC · JPL
238567	2004 XO_{78}	—	December 10, 2004	Socorro	LINEAR	MAR	1.5 km	MPC · JPL
238568	2004 XF_{80}	—	December 10, 2004	Vail-Jarnac	Jarnac	·	2.8 km	MPC · JPL
238569	2004 XL_{80}	—	December 10, 2004	Socorro	LINEAR	·	1.8 km	MPC · JPL
238570	2004 XP_{86}	—	December 13, 2004	Kitt Peak	Spacewatch	·	1.8 km	MPC · JPL
238571	2004 XE_{87}	—	December 9, 2004	Catalina	CSS	·	1.8 km	MPC · JPL
238572	2004 XO_{89}	—	December 11, 2004	Socorro	LINEAR	·	1.9 km	MPC · JPL
238573	2004 XL_{98}	—	December 11, 2004	Kitt Peak	Spacewatch	·	1.9 km	MPC · JPL
238574	2004 XK_{111}	—	December 14, 2004	Kitt Peak	Spacewatch	(5)	1.7 km	MPC · JPL
238575	2004 XR_{121}	—	December 15, 2004	Kitt Peak	Spacewatch	·	1.4 km	MPC · JPL
238576	2004 XZ_{123}	—	December 10, 2004	Socorro	LINEAR	·	4.0 km	MPC · JPL
238577	2004 XM_{124}	—	December 10, 2004	Socorro	LINEAR	GAL	1.9 km	MPC · JPL
238578	2004 XJ_{126}	—	December 12, 2004	Kitt Peak	Spacewatch	·	2.1 km	MPC · JPL
238579	2004 XP_{146}	—	December 14, 2004	Catalina	CSS	·	3.9 km	MPC · JPL
238580	2004 XC_{162}	—	December 15, 2004	Catalina	CSS	PHO	3.2 km	MPC · JPL
238581	2004 XP_{163}	—	December 15, 2004	Kitt Peak	Spacewatch	·	1.8 km	MPC · JPL
238582	2004 XV_{164}	—	December 1, 2004	Socorro	LINEAR	·	2.2 km	MPC · JPL
238583	2004 XF_{171}	—	December 9, 2004	Catalina	CSS	·	3.7 km	MPC · JPL
238584	2004 XR_{181}	—	December 15, 2004	Socorro	LINEAR	·	2.7 km	MPC · JPL
238585	2004 XQ_{191}	—	December 11, 2004	Catalina	CSS	EUN	3.3 km	MPC · JPL
238586	2004 YK_{2}	—	December 16, 2004	Socorro	LINEAR	·	2.5 km	MPC · JPL
238587	2004 YX_{3}	—	December 16, 2004	Kitt Peak	Spacewatch	·	2.2 km	MPC · JPL
238588	2004 YE_{4}	—	December 16, 2004	Kitt Peak	Spacewatch	KOR	2.1 km	MPC · JPL
238589	2004 YL_{5}	—	December 20, 2004	Needville	Wells, D.	EUN	2.0 km	MPC · JPL
238590	2004 YC_{20}	—	December 18, 2004	Mount Lemmon	Mount Lemmon Survey	·	3.0 km	MPC · JPL
238591	2004 YS_{21}	—	December 18, 2004	Mount Lemmon	Mount Lemmon Survey	·	2.1 km	MPC · JPL
238592	2004 YQ_{25}	—	December 18, 2004	Socorro	LINEAR	·	2.0 km	MPC · JPL
238593 Paysdegex	2005 AS	Paysdegex	January 4, 2005	Vicques	M. Ory	·	2.0 km	MPC · JPL
238594	2005 AB_{4}	—	January 6, 2005	Catalina	CSS	·	2.1 km	MPC · JPL
238595	2005 AW_{5}	—	January 6, 2005	Catalina	CSS	·	2.8 km	MPC · JPL
238596	2005 AJ_{13}	—	January 6, 2005	Socorro	LINEAR	·	1.5 km	MPC · JPL
238597	2005 AO_{20}	—	January 6, 2005	Socorro	LINEAR	·	1.9 km	MPC · JPL
238598	2005 AE_{23}	—	January 7, 2005	Socorro	LINEAR	·	2.2 km	MPC · JPL
238599	2005 AT_{23}	—	January 7, 2005	Kitt Peak	Spacewatch	·	3.0 km	MPC · JPL
238600	2005 AZ_{42}	—	January 15, 2005	Socorro	LINEAR	·	2.5 km	MPC · JPL

== 238601–238700 ==
back to top

Designation			Discovery			Properties		Ref
Permanent	Provisional	Named after	Date	Site	Discoverer(s)	Category	Diam.	Ref
238601	2005 AC_{45}	—	January 15, 2005	Kitt Peak	Spacewatch	·	2.1 km	MPC · JPL
238602	2005 AN_{46}	—	January 11, 2005	Socorro	LINEAR	·	3.1 km	MPC · JPL
238603	2005 AS_{48}	—	January 13, 2005	Kitt Peak	Spacewatch	·	2.0 km	MPC · JPL
238604	2005 AP_{53}	—	January 13, 2005	Socorro	LINEAR	·	5.6 km	MPC · JPL
238605	2005 AF_{55}	—	January 15, 2005	Socorro	LINEAR	·	2.3 km	MPC · JPL
238606	2005 AR_{67}	—	January 13, 2005	Catalina	CSS	(5)	1.6 km	MPC · JPL
238607	2005 AF_{75}	—	January 15, 2005	Kitt Peak	Spacewatch	·	1.8 km	MPC · JPL
238608	2005 AW_{80}	—	January 15, 2005	Kitt Peak	Spacewatch	·	2.4 km	MPC · JPL
238609	2005 AB_{81}	—	January 15, 2005	Kitt Peak	Spacewatch	·	3.4 km	MPC · JPL
238610	2005 BM	—	January 16, 2005	Desert Eagle	W. K. Y. Yeung	·	1.8 km	MPC · JPL
238611	2005 BM_{2}	—	January 16, 2005	Socorro	LINEAR	·	2.7 km	MPC · JPL
238612	2005 BG_{9}	—	January 16, 2005	Socorro	LINEAR	·	1.9 km	MPC · JPL
238613	2005 BC_{10}	—	January 16, 2005	Socorro	LINEAR	AEO	1.4 km	MPC · JPL
238614	2005 BY_{10}	—	January 16, 2005	Kitt Peak	Spacewatch	(5)	1.8 km	MPC · JPL
238615	2005 BP_{16}	—	January 16, 2005	Socorro	LINEAR	·	2.2 km	MPC · JPL
238616	2005 BT_{21}	—	January 16, 2005	Kitt Peak	Spacewatch	·	3.1 km	MPC · JPL
238617	2005 BL_{22}	—	January 16, 2005	Kitt Peak	Spacewatch	·	2.1 km	MPC · JPL
238618	2005 BX_{23}	—	January 17, 2005	Kitt Peak	Spacewatch	·	1.9 km	MPC · JPL
238619	2005 BG_{24}	—	January 17, 2005	Catalina	CSS	·	2.3 km	MPC · JPL
238620	2005 BK_{25}	—	January 18, 2005	Catalina	CSS	(10369)	4.0 km	MPC · JPL
238621	2005 BE_{39}	—	January 16, 2005	Mauna Kea	Veillet, C.	(11882)	1.9 km	MPC · JPL
238622	2005 CT_{11}	—	February 1, 2005	Catalina	CSS	·	5.8 km	MPC · JPL
238623	2005 CL_{12}	—	February 1, 2005	Piszkés-tető	Kelemen, J.	L5	13 km	MPC · JPL
238624	2005 CV_{13}	—	February 2, 2005	Palomar	NEAT	·	2.3 km	MPC · JPL
238625	2005 CB_{14}	—	February 2, 2005	Kitt Peak	Spacewatch	·	3.5 km	MPC · JPL
238626	2005 CC_{21}	—	February 2, 2005	Catalina	CSS	·	2.9 km	MPC · JPL
238627	2005 CL_{21}	—	February 2, 2005	Catalina	CSS	AEO	2.8 km	MPC · JPL
238628	2005 CG_{22}	—	February 3, 2005	Socorro	LINEAR	·	1.8 km	MPC · JPL
238629	2005 CA_{24}	—	February 2, 2005	Palomar	NEAT	·	3.1 km	MPC · JPL
238630	2005 CK_{25}	—	February 4, 2005	Altschwendt	Altschwendt	·	2.4 km	MPC · JPL
238631	2005 CJ_{27}	—	February 2, 2005	Socorro	LINEAR	·	5.3 km	MPC · JPL
238632	2005 CD_{32}	—	February 1, 2005	Kitt Peak	Spacewatch	·	2.1 km	MPC · JPL
238633	2005 CB_{36}	—	February 3, 2005	Socorro	LINEAR	·	2.4 km	MPC · JPL
238634	2005 CD_{48}	—	February 2, 2005	Kitt Peak	Spacewatch	·	2.8 km	MPC · JPL
238635	2005 CT_{53}	—	February 4, 2005	Kitt Peak	Spacewatch	·	2.3 km	MPC · JPL
238636	2005 CF_{55}	—	February 4, 2005	Mount Lemmon	Mount Lemmon Survey	·	2.0 km	MPC · JPL
238637	2005 CR_{65}	—	February 9, 2005	Kitt Peak	Spacewatch	DOR	4.0 km	MPC · JPL
238638	2005 CB_{76}	—	February 2, 2005	Kitt Peak	Spacewatch	AST	2.0 km	MPC · JPL
238639	2005 EK_{6}	—	March 1, 2005	Kitt Peak	Spacewatch	·	2.2 km	MPC · JPL
238640	2005 EM_{6}	—	March 1, 2005	Kitt Peak	Spacewatch	·	2.5 km	MPC · JPL
238641	2005 EF_{11}	—	March 2, 2005	Catalina	CSS	·	3.5 km	MPC · JPL
238642	2005 EL_{12}	—	March 2, 2005	Catalina	CSS	DOR	4.3 km	MPC · JPL
238643	2005 EX_{17}	—	March 3, 2005	Kitt Peak	Spacewatch	·	3.5 km	MPC · JPL
238644	2005 EY_{19}	—	March 3, 2005	Catalina	CSS	VER	5.2 km	MPC · JPL
238645	2005 EL_{25}	—	March 3, 2005	Catalina	CSS	·	2.7 km	MPC · JPL
238646	2005 EU_{25}	—	March 3, 2005	Catalina	CSS	·	3.7 km	MPC · JPL
238647	2005 EK_{37}	—	March 4, 2005	Mount Lemmon	Mount Lemmon Survey	H	940 m	MPC · JPL
238648	2005 EZ_{40}	—	March 1, 2005	Catalina	CSS	·	3.8 km	MPC · JPL
238649	2005 ET_{42}	—	March 3, 2005	Kitt Peak	Spacewatch	·	2.3 km	MPC · JPL
238650	2005 EV_{44}	—	March 3, 2005	Kitt Peak	Spacewatch	·	3.3 km	MPC · JPL
238651	2005 EC_{45}	—	March 3, 2005	Catalina	CSS	·	2.4 km	MPC · JPL
238652	2005 EE_{58}	—	March 4, 2005	Mount Lemmon	Mount Lemmon Survey	·	4.2 km	MPC · JPL
238653	2005 EX_{77}	—	March 3, 2005	Catalina	CSS	·	3.4 km	MPC · JPL
238654	2005 EY_{85}	—	March 4, 2005	Socorro	LINEAR	·	3.4 km	MPC · JPL
238655	2005 EV_{97}	—	March 3, 2005	Catalina	CSS	·	2.5 km	MPC · JPL
238656	2005 EU_{102}	—	March 4, 2005	Kitt Peak	Spacewatch	·	3.4 km	MPC · JPL
238657	2005 EV_{103}	—	March 4, 2005	Kitt Peak	Spacewatch	KOR	2.0 km	MPC · JPL
238658	2005 EP_{109}	—	March 4, 2005	Mount Lemmon	Mount Lemmon Survey	·	2.8 km	MPC · JPL
238659	2005 EG_{114}	—	March 4, 2005	Mount Lemmon	Mount Lemmon Survey	KOR	1.5 km	MPC · JPL
238660	2005 ER_{116}	—	March 4, 2005	Mount Lemmon	Mount Lemmon Survey	HYG	3.2 km	MPC · JPL
238661	2005 EW_{121}	—	March 8, 2005	Socorro	LINEAR	·	2.9 km	MPC · JPL
238662	2005 EN_{128}	—	March 9, 2005	Kitt Peak	Spacewatch	·	2.4 km	MPC · JPL
238663	2005 ES_{138}	—	March 9, 2005	Socorro	LINEAR	·	3.4 km	MPC · JPL
238664	2005 EL_{143}	—	March 10, 2005	Mount Lemmon	Mount Lemmon Survey	·	2.3 km	MPC · JPL
238665	2005 EJ_{144}	—	March 10, 2005	Mount Lemmon	Mount Lemmon Survey	KOR	1.8 km	MPC · JPL
238666	2005 ED_{148}	—	March 10, 2005	Kitt Peak	Spacewatch	·	3.2 km	MPC · JPL
238667	2005 EE_{158}	—	March 9, 2005	Mount Lemmon	Mount Lemmon Survey	THM	3.4 km	MPC · JPL
238668	2005 ED_{160}	—	March 9, 2005	Mount Lemmon	Mount Lemmon Survey	·	2.0 km	MPC · JPL
238669	2005 EQ_{163}	—	March 10, 2005	Mount Lemmon	Mount Lemmon Survey	AST	2.7 km	MPC · JPL
238670	2005 EQ_{171}	—	March 7, 2005	Socorro	LINEAR	·	3.3 km	MPC · JPL
238671	2005 EM_{179}	—	March 9, 2005	Kitt Peak	Spacewatch	KOR	1.7 km	MPC · JPL
238672	2005 EK_{182}	—	March 9, 2005	Anderson Mesa	LONEOS	·	3.7 km	MPC · JPL
238673	2005 EN_{185}	—	March 10, 2005	Mount Lemmon	Mount Lemmon Survey	·	1.7 km	MPC · JPL
238674	2005 EX_{187}	—	March 10, 2005	Mount Lemmon	Mount Lemmon Survey	·	3.3 km	MPC · JPL
238675	2005 EN_{192}	—	March 11, 2005	Mount Lemmon	Mount Lemmon Survey	·	2.6 km	MPC · JPL
238676	2005 EC_{193}	—	March 11, 2005	Mount Lemmon	Mount Lemmon Survey	·	4.8 km	MPC · JPL
238677	2005 EN_{201}	—	March 8, 2005	Catalina	CSS	EUN	1.9 km	MPC · JPL
238678	2005 EP_{205}	—	March 13, 2005	Kitt Peak	Spacewatch	MRX	1.3 km	MPC · JPL
238679	2005 EL_{207}	—	March 8, 2005	Anderson Mesa	LONEOS	·	2.7 km	MPC · JPL
238680	2005 EA_{209}	—	March 4, 2005	Kitt Peak	Spacewatch	·	2.6 km	MPC · JPL
238681	2005 EM_{212}	—	March 4, 2005	Catalina	CSS	·	5.4 km	MPC · JPL
238682	2005 ES_{219}	—	March 10, 2005	Mount Lemmon	Mount Lemmon Survey	·	3.3 km	MPC · JPL
238683	2005 EX_{226}	—	March 9, 2005	Mount Lemmon	Mount Lemmon Survey	TEL	1.4 km	MPC · JPL
238684	2005 EF_{235}	—	March 10, 2005	Mount Lemmon	Mount Lemmon Survey	NAE	3.6 km	MPC · JPL
238685	2005 EH_{237}	—	March 11, 2005	Kitt Peak	Spacewatch	HOF	3.5 km	MPC · JPL
238686	2005 ES_{243}	—	March 11, 2005	Kitt Peak	Spacewatch	·	4.2 km	MPC · JPL
238687	2005 EK_{246}	—	March 12, 2005	Kitt Peak	Spacewatch	·	2.6 km	MPC · JPL
238688	2005 EO_{248}	—	March 12, 2005	Kitt Peak	Spacewatch	KOR	1.5 km	MPC · JPL
238689	2005 EL_{253}	—	March 11, 2005	Kitt Peak	Spacewatch	·	2.4 km	MPC · JPL
238690	2005 EK_{255}	—	March 11, 2005	Mount Lemmon	Mount Lemmon Survey	·	2.2 km	MPC · JPL
238691	2005 EK_{263}	—	March 13, 2005	Kitt Peak	Spacewatch	KOR	1.7 km	MPC · JPL
238692	2005 EA_{269}	—	March 14, 2005	Mount Lemmon	Mount Lemmon Survey	·	2.5 km	MPC · JPL
238693	2005 EG_{269}	—	March 15, 2005	Catalina	CSS	TIR	2.9 km	MPC · JPL
238694	2005 EO_{270}	—	March 15, 2005	Kitt Peak	Spacewatch	·	3.3 km	MPC · JPL
238695	2005 EX_{283}	—	March 11, 2005	Kitt Peak	Spacewatch	·	4.4 km	MPC · JPL
238696	2005 EE_{287}	—	March 3, 2005	Catalina	CSS	GEF	1.6 km	MPC · JPL
238697	2005 ES_{287}	—	March 8, 2005	Anderson Mesa	LONEOS	GEF	2.1 km	MPC · JPL
238698	2005 EM_{288}	—	March 8, 2005	Socorro	LINEAR	·	3.5 km	MPC · JPL
238699	2005 EP_{323}	—	March 10, 2005	Mount Lemmon	Mount Lemmon Survey	·	2.4 km	MPC · JPL
238700	2005 EC_{327}	—	March 10, 2005	Mount Lemmon	Mount Lemmon Survey	·	4.3 km	MPC · JPL

== 238701–238800 ==
back to top

Designation			Discovery			Properties		Ref
Permanent	Provisional	Named after	Date	Site	Discoverer(s)	Category	Diam.	Ref
238701	2005 EE_{327}	—	March 11, 2005	Mount Lemmon	Mount Lemmon Survey	KOR	1.9 km	MPC · JPL
238702	2005 ED_{328}	—	March 13, 2005	Catalina	CSS	·	5.3 km	MPC · JPL
238703	2005 FR_{4}	—	March 31, 2005	Vail-Jarnac	Jarnac	·	3.2 km	MPC · JPL
238704	2005 FO_{5}	—	March 31, 2005	Bergisch Gladbach	Bergisch Gladbach	KOR	1.8 km	MPC · JPL
238705	2005 GY_{9}	—	April 2, 2005	Kitt Peak	Spacewatch	·	3.5 km	MPC · JPL
238706	2005 GF_{10}	—	April 4, 2005	Catalina	CSS	·	3.6 km	MPC · JPL
238707	2005 GZ_{10}	—	April 1, 2005	Anderson Mesa	LONEOS	EOS	3.0 km	MPC · JPL
238708	2005 GD_{15}	—	April 2, 2005	Mount Lemmon	Mount Lemmon Survey	·	4.3 km	MPC · JPL
238709	2005 GT_{21}	—	April 4, 2005	Kitt Peak	Spacewatch	H	630 m	MPC · JPL
238710 Halassy	2005 GW_{21}	Halassy	April 4, 2005	Piszkéstető	K. Sárneczky	HOF	2.9 km	MPC · JPL
238711	2005 GD_{35}	—	April 2, 2005	Needville	Needville	·	3.5 km	MPC · JPL
238712	2005 GH_{36}	—	April 2, 2005	Catalina	CSS	·	5.8 km	MPC · JPL
238713	2005 GQ_{37}	—	April 2, 2005	Siding Spring	SSS	·	3.9 km	MPC · JPL
238714	2005 GP_{40}	—	April 4, 2005	Mount Lemmon	Mount Lemmon Survey	·	4.3 km	MPC · JPL
238715	2005 GQ_{44}	—	April 5, 2005	Mount Lemmon	Mount Lemmon Survey	·	2.4 km	MPC · JPL
238716	2005 GM_{45}	—	April 5, 2005	Palomar	NEAT	·	3.5 km	MPC · JPL
238717	2005 GO_{47}	—	April 5, 2005	Mount Lemmon	Mount Lemmon Survey	·	3.2 km	MPC · JPL
238718	2005 GB_{55}	—	April 5, 2005	Mount Lemmon	Mount Lemmon Survey	KOR	1.6 km	MPC · JPL
238719	2005 GO_{62}	—	April 2, 2005	Mount Lemmon	Mount Lemmon Survey	·	6.0 km	MPC · JPL
238720	2005 GB_{64}	—	April 2, 2005	Catalina	CSS	·	2.3 km	MPC · JPL
238721	2005 GC_{67}	—	April 2, 2005	Mount Lemmon	Mount Lemmon Survey	KOR	1.7 km	MPC · JPL
238722	2005 GK_{76}	—	April 5, 2005	Palomar	NEAT	·	6.3 km	MPC · JPL
238723	2005 GD_{79}	—	April 6, 2005	Catalina	CSS	TIR ·	6.2 km	MPC · JPL
238724	2005 GT_{79}	—	April 6, 2005	Mount Lemmon	Mount Lemmon Survey	·	2.7 km	MPC · JPL
238725	2005 GE_{82}	—	April 4, 2005	Mount Lemmon	Mount Lemmon Survey	·	3.2 km	MPC · JPL
238726	2005 GK_{82}	—	April 4, 2005	Catalina	CSS	·	5.3 km	MPC · JPL
238727	2005 GK_{86}	—	April 4, 2005	Catalina	CSS	KOR	1.8 km	MPC · JPL
238728	2005 GU_{86}	—	April 4, 2005	Mount Lemmon	Mount Lemmon Survey	EOS	4.5 km	MPC · JPL
238729	2005 GZ_{87}	—	April 5, 2005	Anderson Mesa	LONEOS	·	3.9 km	MPC · JPL
238730	2005 GT_{101}	—	April 9, 2005	Kitt Peak	Spacewatch	·	3.4 km	MPC · JPL
238731	2005 GD_{105}	—	April 10, 2005	Kitt Peak	Spacewatch	BRA	2.1 km	MPC · JPL
238732	2005 GO_{108}	—	April 10, 2005	Mount Lemmon	Mount Lemmon Survey	·	2.3 km	MPC · JPL
238733	2005 GS_{110}	—	April 10, 2005	Mount Lemmon	Mount Lemmon Survey	·	3.5 km	MPC · JPL
238734	2005 GN_{116}	—	April 11, 2005	Kitt Peak	Spacewatch	·	3.3 km	MPC · JPL
238735	2005 GC_{118}	—	April 11, 2005	Mount Lemmon	Mount Lemmon Survey	·	2.8 km	MPC · JPL
238736	2005 GT_{120}	—	April 5, 2005	Mount Lemmon	Mount Lemmon Survey	·	2.5 km	MPC · JPL
238737	2005 GM_{121}	—	April 5, 2005	Kitt Peak	Spacewatch	·	5.0 km	MPC · JPL
238738	2005 GY_{125}	—	April 11, 2005	Mount Lemmon	Mount Lemmon Survey	KOR	1.8 km	MPC · JPL
238739	2005 GJ_{128}	—	April 12, 2005	Socorro	LINEAR	HYG	4.4 km	MPC · JPL
238740	2005 GS_{130}	—	April 8, 2005	Socorro	LINEAR	·	5.1 km	MPC · JPL
238741	2005 GX_{131}	—	April 10, 2005	Kitt Peak	Spacewatch	·	2.9 km	MPC · JPL
238742	2005 GQ_{134}	—	April 10, 2005	Mount Lemmon	Mount Lemmon Survey	·	2.1 km	MPC · JPL
238743	2005 GV_{134}	—	April 10, 2005	Mount Lemmon	Mount Lemmon Survey	·	3.7 km	MPC · JPL
238744	2005 GB_{141}	—	April 14, 2005	Kitt Peak	Spacewatch	·	3.5 km	MPC · JPL
238745	2005 GA_{144}	—	April 10, 2005	Kitt Peak	Spacewatch	·	2.9 km	MPC · JPL
238746	2005 GG_{150}	—	April 11, 2005	Kitt Peak	Spacewatch	·	2.7 km	MPC · JPL
238747	2005 GJ_{160}	—	April 12, 2005	Kitt Peak	Spacewatch	(16286)	2.6 km	MPC · JPL
238748	2005 GD_{164}	—	April 10, 2005	Mount Lemmon	Mount Lemmon Survey	EOS	2.5 km	MPC · JPL
238749	2005 GZ_{171}	—	April 13, 2005	Kitt Peak	Spacewatch	·	3.4 km	MPC · JPL
238750	2005 GL_{174}	—	April 14, 2005	Kitt Peak	Spacewatch	EOS	2.2 km	MPC · JPL
238751	2005 GG_{225}	—	April 2, 2005	Mount Lemmon	Mount Lemmon Survey	·	3.7 km	MPC · JPL
238752	2005 HF_{4}	—	April 30, 2005	Mayhill	Lowe, A.	·	5.4 km	MPC · JPL
238753	2005 HY_{7}	—	April 30, 2005	Palomar	NEAT	·	3.1 km	MPC · JPL
238754	2005 HN_{10}	—	April 16, 2005	Kitt Peak	Spacewatch	KOR	1.5 km	MPC · JPL
238755	2005 JA_{1}	—	May 3, 2005	Socorro	LINEAR	EOS	2.9 km	MPC · JPL
238756	2005 JY_{3}	—	May 2, 2005	Kitt Peak	Spacewatch	·	2.8 km	MPC · JPL
238757	2005 JB_{15}	—	May 2, 2005	Kitt Peak	Spacewatch	·	2.8 km	MPC · JPL
238758	2005 JK_{16}	—	May 4, 2005	Kitt Peak	Spacewatch	·	2.9 km	MPC · JPL
238759	2005 JY_{20}	—	May 4, 2005	Palomar	NEAT	EOS	2.5 km	MPC · JPL
238760	2005 JP_{28}	—	May 3, 2005	Kitt Peak	Spacewatch	·	3.6 km	MPC · JPL
238761	2005 JW_{54}	—	May 4, 2005	Mount Lemmon	Mount Lemmon Survey	THM	2.4 km	MPC · JPL
238762	2005 JK_{61}	—	May 8, 2005	Kitt Peak	Spacewatch	·	3.8 km	MPC · JPL
238763	2005 JT_{68}	—	May 6, 2005	Socorro	LINEAR	·	3.3 km	MPC · JPL
238764	2005 JV_{81}	—	May 3, 2005	Kitt Peak	Spacewatch	·	3.8 km	MPC · JPL
238765	2005 JJ_{82}	—	May 6, 2005	Mount Lemmon	Mount Lemmon Survey	·	3.6 km	MPC · JPL
238766	2005 JF_{85}	—	May 8, 2005	Socorro	LINEAR	·	3.7 km	MPC · JPL
238767	2005 JV_{85}	—	May 8, 2005	Mount Lemmon	Mount Lemmon Survey	EOS	2.5 km	MPC · JPL
238768	2005 JD_{87}	—	May 9, 2005	Mount Lemmon	Mount Lemmon Survey	·	2.8 km	MPC · JPL
238769	2005 JL_{93}	—	May 11, 2005	Palomar	NEAT	·	2.8 km	MPC · JPL
238770	2005 JN_{93}	—	May 11, 2005	Palomar	NEAT	EOS	2.7 km	MPC · JPL
238771 Juhászbalázs	2005 JB_{94}	Juhászbalázs	May 12, 2005	Piszkéstető	K. Sárneczky	·	2.8 km	MPC · JPL
238772	2005 JZ_{94}	—	May 7, 2005	Mount Lemmon	Mount Lemmon Survey	EOS	3.0 km	MPC · JPL
238773	2005 JO_{97}	—	May 8, 2005	Kitt Peak	Spacewatch	·	3.6 km	MPC · JPL
238774	2005 JM_{106}	—	May 11, 2005	Palomar	NEAT	·	3.1 km	MPC · JPL
238775	2005 JV_{127}	—	May 12, 2005	Socorro	LINEAR	·	4.9 km	MPC · JPL
238776	2005 JR_{136}	—	May 12, 2005	Kitt Peak	Spacewatch	·	2.6 km	MPC · JPL
238777	2005 JO_{138}	—	May 13, 2005	Kitt Peak	Spacewatch	·	3.6 km	MPC · JPL
238778	2005 JB_{139}	—	May 13, 2005	Mount Lemmon	Mount Lemmon Survey	EOS	3.8 km	MPC · JPL
238779	2005 JF_{139}	—	May 13, 2005	Catalina	CSS	·	2.2 km	MPC · JPL
238780	2005 JD_{145}	—	May 15, 2005	Mount Lemmon	Mount Lemmon Survey	EOS	2.6 km	MPC · JPL
238781	2005 JD_{147}	—	May 15, 2005	Palomar	NEAT	·	2.8 km	MPC · JPL
238782	2005 JK_{147}	—	May 15, 2005	Palomar	NEAT	·	4.5 km	MPC · JPL
238783	2005 JA_{150}	—	May 3, 2005	Kitt Peak	Spacewatch	·	3.6 km	MPC · JPL
238784	2005 JK_{151}	—	May 3, 2005	Catalina	CSS	·	5.2 km	MPC · JPL
238785	2005 JE_{162}	—	May 8, 2005	Kitt Peak	Spacewatch	·	3.6 km	MPC · JPL
238786	2005 JK_{162}	—	May 8, 2005	Kitt Peak	Spacewatch	PAD	2.6 km	MPC · JPL
238787	2005 JX_{180}	—	May 4, 2005	Anderson Mesa	LONEOS	·	3.0 km	MPC · JPL
238788	2005 KX_{3}	—	May 17, 2005	Mount Lemmon	Mount Lemmon Survey	·	2.1 km	MPC · JPL
238789	2005 KA_{9}	—	May 19, 2005	Mount Lemmon	Mount Lemmon Survey	·	4.2 km	MPC · JPL
238790	2005 KY_{9}	—	May 30, 2005	Reedy Creek	J. Broughton	·	4.6 km	MPC · JPL
238791	2005 KZ_{11}	—	May 30, 2005	Siding Spring	SSS	·	2.8 km	MPC · JPL
238792	2005 KU_{13}	—	May 16, 2005	Mount Lemmon	Mount Lemmon Survey	·	3.2 km	MPC · JPL
238793	2005 KE_{14}	—	May 20, 2005	Mount Lemmon	Mount Lemmon Survey	NAE	3.7 km	MPC · JPL
238794	2005 LO_{1}	—	June 1, 2005	Mount Lemmon	Mount Lemmon Survey	·	4.9 km	MPC · JPL
238795	2005 LK_{4}	—	June 1, 2005	Kitt Peak	Spacewatch	EOS	3.5 km	MPC · JPL
238796	2005 LF_{10}	—	June 3, 2005	Kitt Peak	Spacewatch	·	2.8 km	MPC · JPL
238797	2005 LM_{21}	—	June 6, 2005	Kitt Peak	Spacewatch	·	3.0 km	MPC · JPL
238798	2005 LZ_{21}	—	June 9, 2005	Catalina	CSS	·	4.9 km	MPC · JPL
238799	2005 LU_{22}	—	June 8, 2005	Kitt Peak	Spacewatch	·	4.0 km	MPC · JPL
238800	2005 LL_{27}	—	June 9, 2005	Kitt Peak	Spacewatch	·	2.0 km	MPC · JPL

== 238801–238900 ==
back to top

Designation			Discovery			Properties		Ref
Permanent	Provisional	Named after	Date	Site	Discoverer(s)	Category	Diam.	Ref
238801	2005 LF_{36}	—	June 13, 2005	Mount Lemmon	Mount Lemmon Survey	·	5.1 km	MPC · JPL
238802	2005 LB_{38}	—	June 11, 2005	Kitt Peak	Spacewatch	·	3.9 km	MPC · JPL
238803	2005 LB_{53}	—	June 1, 2005	Mount Lemmon	Mount Lemmon Survey	·	6.1 km	MPC · JPL
238804	2005 LH_{53}	—	June 13, 2005	Mount Lemmon	Mount Lemmon Survey	3:2 · SHU	7.6 km	MPC · JPL
238805	2005 LZ_{53}	—	June 8, 2005	Kitt Peak	Spacewatch	THM	3.3 km	MPC · JPL
238806	2005 MQ_{1}	—	June 16, 2005	Reedy Creek	J. Broughton	·	6.1 km	MPC · JPL
238807	2005 MQ_{7}	—	June 27, 2005	Mount Lemmon	Mount Lemmon Survey	·	6.4 km	MPC · JPL
238808	2005 MS_{10}	—	June 27, 2005	Kitt Peak	Spacewatch	·	2.8 km	MPC · JPL
238809	2005 MT_{13}	—	June 28, 2005	Kitt Peak	Spacewatch	·	3.2 km	MPC · JPL
238810	2005 MY_{29}	—	June 29, 2005	Kitt Peak	Spacewatch	·	5.0 km	MPC · JPL
238811	2005 NO_{20}	—	July 6, 2005	Siding Spring	SSS	H	870 m	MPC · JPL
238812	2005 ND_{23}	—	July 4, 2005	Socorro	LINEAR	·	6.5 km	MPC · JPL
238813	2005 NT_{70}	—	July 4, 2005	Palomar	NEAT	·	5.1 km	MPC · JPL
238814	2005 NU_{123}	—	July 15, 2005	Kitt Peak	Spacewatch	·	3.5 km	MPC · JPL
238815	2005 OQ_{16}	—	July 30, 2005	Palomar	NEAT	H	750 m	MPC · JPL
238816	2005 PU_{9}	—	August 4, 2005	Palomar	NEAT	EMA	5.2 km	MPC · JPL
238817 Titeuf	2005 PQ_{16}	Titeuf	August 10, 2005	Vicques	M. Ory	·	3.0 km	MPC · JPL
238818	2005 PO_{23}	—	August 6, 2005	Siding Spring	SSS	HIL · 3:2	8.0 km	MPC · JPL
238819	2005 QL_{1}	—	August 22, 2005	Palomar	NEAT	3:2	8.6 km	MPC · JPL
238820	2005 QX_{4}	—	August 24, 2005	Siding Spring	SSS	H	910 m	MPC · JPL
238821	2005 QJ_{9}	—	August 25, 2005	Palomar	NEAT	·	1.2 km	MPC · JPL
238822	2005 QQ_{60}	—	August 26, 2005	Anderson Mesa	LONEOS	·	2.4 km	MPC · JPL
238823	2005 QK_{73}	—	August 29, 2005	Anderson Mesa	LONEOS	·	4.1 km	MPC · JPL
238824	2005 QK_{90}	—	August 25, 2005	Palomar	NEAT	·	3.3 km	MPC · JPL
238825	2005 SH_{10}	—	September 26, 2005	Socorro	LINEAR	PHO	3.5 km	MPC · JPL
238826	2005 SJ_{62}	—	September 26, 2005	Kitt Peak	Spacewatch	·	4.6 km	MPC · JPL
238827	2005 SE_{85}	—	September 24, 2005	Kitt Peak	Spacewatch	3:2	5.4 km	MPC · JPL
238828	2005 SU_{100}	—	September 25, 2005	Kitt Peak	Spacewatch	·	850 m	MPC · JPL
238829	2005 SZ_{185}	—	September 29, 2005	Palomar	NEAT	T_{j} (2.98) · HIL · 3:2	7.3 km	MPC · JPL
238830	2005 TM_{13}	—	October 3, 2005	Socorro	LINEAR	·	1.4 km	MPC · JPL
238831	2005 TZ_{61}	—	October 4, 2005	Mount Lemmon	Mount Lemmon Survey	·	680 m	MPC · JPL
238832	2005 TG_{65}	—	October 1, 2005	Kitt Peak	Spacewatch	·	1.4 km	MPC · JPL
238833	2005 TZ_{82}	—	October 3, 2005	Socorro	LINEAR	·	1.0 km	MPC · JPL
238834	2005 TN_{134}	—	October 10, 2005	Kitt Peak	Spacewatch	3:2 · SHU	6.7 km	MPC · JPL
238835	2005 TX_{179}	—	October 6, 2005	Catalina	CSS	·	2.9 km	MPC · JPL
238836	2005 TX_{190}	—	October 13, 2005	Kitt Peak	Spacewatch	·	1.4 km	MPC · JPL
238837	2005 UH_{2}	—	October 23, 2005	Goodricke-Pigott	R. A. Tucker	·	760 m	MPC · JPL
238838	2005 UH_{9}	—	October 21, 2005	Palomar	NEAT	·	1.0 km	MPC · JPL
238839	2005 UE_{13}	—	October 22, 2005	Kitt Peak	Spacewatch	·	1.5 km	MPC · JPL
238840	2005 UX_{29}	—	October 23, 2005	Catalina	CSS	·	2.1 km	MPC · JPL
238841	2005 UY_{124}	—	October 24, 2005	Kitt Peak	Spacewatch	MAS	810 m	MPC · JPL
238842	2005 UX_{147}	—	October 26, 2005	Kitt Peak	Spacewatch	·	840 m	MPC · JPL
238843	2005 UM_{172}	—	October 24, 2005	Kitt Peak	Spacewatch	·	840 m	MPC · JPL
238844	2005 US_{185}	—	October 25, 2005	Mount Lemmon	Mount Lemmon Survey	·	770 m	MPC · JPL
238845	2005 UX_{196}	—	October 24, 2005	Kitt Peak	Spacewatch	·	620 m	MPC · JPL
238846	2005 US_{220}	—	October 25, 2005	Kitt Peak	Spacewatch	·	860 m	MPC · JPL
238847	2005 UR_{279}	—	October 24, 2005	Kitt Peak	Spacewatch	3:2 · SHU	8.4 km	MPC · JPL
238848	2005 UO_{456}	—	October 30, 2005	Catalina	CSS	·	690 m	MPC · JPL
238849	2005 UH_{491}	—	October 24, 2005	Palomar	NEAT	·	5.3 km	MPC · JPL
238850	2005 UL_{530}	—	October 24, 2005	Mauna Kea	D. J. Tholen	·	3.2 km	MPC · JPL
238851	2005 VS_{3}	—	November 1, 2005	Socorro	LINEAR	·	2.0 km	MPC · JPL
238852	2005 VZ_{6}	—	November 12, 2005	Socorro	LINEAR	PHO	1.2 km	MPC · JPL
238853	2005 VZ_{30}	—	November 4, 2005	Kitt Peak	Spacewatch	·	1.3 km	MPC · JPL
238854	2005 VL_{86}	—	November 4, 2005	Mount Lemmon	Mount Lemmon Survey	·	920 m	MPC · JPL
238855	2005 WN_{6}	—	November 21, 2005	Catalina	CSS	·	2.1 km	MPC · JPL
238856	2005 WQ_{77}	—	November 25, 2005	Kitt Peak	Spacewatch	·	960 m	MPC · JPL
238857	2005 WN_{87}	—	November 28, 2005	Mount Lemmon	Mount Lemmon Survey	·	1.1 km	MPC · JPL
238858	2005 WV_{113}	—	November 28, 2005	Kitt Peak	Spacewatch	·	830 m	MPC · JPL
238859	2005 WB_{116}	—	November 30, 2005	Socorro	LINEAR	·	1.6 km	MPC · JPL
238860	2005 WJ_{125}	—	November 25, 2005	Mount Lemmon	Mount Lemmon Survey	·	2.5 km	MPC · JPL
238861	2005 WL_{140}	—	November 26, 2005	Mount Lemmon	Mount Lemmon Survey	·	1.0 km	MPC · JPL
238862	2005 WV_{150}	—	November 28, 2005	Socorro	LINEAR	·	1.8 km	MPC · JPL
238863	2005 WK_{158}	—	November 26, 2005	Mount Lemmon	Mount Lemmon Survey	·	1.5 km	MPC · JPL
238864	2005 WJ_{180}	—	November 21, 2005	Catalina	CSS	·	890 m	MPC · JPL
238865	2005 XA_{6}	—	December 1, 2005	Mount Lemmon	Mount Lemmon Survey	·	770 m	MPC · JPL
238866	2005 XP_{18}	—	December 1, 2005	Kitt Peak	Spacewatch	NYS	1.1 km	MPC · JPL
238867	2005 XP_{20}	—	December 2, 2005	Kitt Peak	Spacewatch	·	730 m	MPC · JPL
238868	2005 XQ_{26}	—	December 4, 2005	Kitt Peak	Spacewatch	·	1.0 km	MPC · JPL
238869	2005 XB_{35}	—	December 4, 2005	Kitt Peak	Spacewatch	NYS	1.1 km	MPC · JPL
238870	2005 XA_{37}	—	December 4, 2005	Kitt Peak	Spacewatch	·	1.0 km	MPC · JPL
238871	2005 XS_{49}	—	December 2, 2005	Kitt Peak	Spacewatch	(2076)	1.5 km	MPC · JPL
238872	2005 XN_{56}	—	December 5, 2005	Socorro	LINEAR	·	1.1 km	MPC · JPL
238873	2005 XN_{91}	—	December 10, 2005	Kitt Peak	Spacewatch	NYS	1.6 km	MPC · JPL
238874	2005 YD_{5}	—	December 21, 2005	Kitt Peak	Spacewatch	·	880 m	MPC · JPL
238875	2005 YT_{15}	—	December 22, 2005	Kitt Peak	Spacewatch	MAS	820 m	MPC · JPL
238876	2005 YU_{24}	—	December 24, 2005	Kitt Peak	Spacewatch	NYS	1.3 km	MPC · JPL
238877	2005 YP_{25}	—	December 24, 2005	Kitt Peak	Spacewatch	NYS	1.4 km	MPC · JPL
238878	2005 YB_{27}	—	December 22, 2005	Kitt Peak	Spacewatch	·	1.5 km	MPC · JPL
238879	2005 YP_{29}	—	December 25, 2005	Kitt Peak	Spacewatch	·	790 m	MPC · JPL
238880	2005 YE_{32}	—	December 22, 2005	Kitt Peak	Spacewatch	NYS	1.4 km	MPC · JPL
238881	2005 YM_{40}	—	December 27, 2005	Eskridge	Farpoint	·	2.0 km	MPC · JPL
238882	2005 YY_{42}	—	December 24, 2005	Kitt Peak	Spacewatch	slow	2.9 km	MPC · JPL
238883	2005 YK_{43}	—	December 24, 2005	Kitt Peak	Spacewatch	NYS	1.0 km	MPC · JPL
238884	2005 YV_{48}	—	December 22, 2005	Kitt Peak	Spacewatch	·	1.1 km	MPC · JPL
238885	2005 YC_{51}	—	December 25, 2005	Mount Lemmon	Mount Lemmon Survey	V	960 m	MPC · JPL
238886	2005 YB_{64}	—	December 24, 2005	Kitt Peak	Spacewatch	·	1.6 km	MPC · JPL
238887	2005 YB_{66}	—	December 25, 2005	Kitt Peak	Spacewatch	·	1.1 km	MPC · JPL
238888	2005 YR_{71}	—	December 24, 2005	Kitt Peak	Spacewatch	·	860 m	MPC · JPL
238889	2005 YS_{72}	—	December 24, 2005	Kitt Peak	Spacewatch	·	1.1 km	MPC · JPL
238890	2005 YG_{86}	—	December 25, 2005	Mount Lemmon	Mount Lemmon Survey	·	1.2 km	MPC · JPL
238891	2005 YT_{91}	—	December 26, 2005	Mount Lemmon	Mount Lemmon Survey	·	1.1 km	MPC · JPL
238892	2005 YB_{94}	—	December 26, 2005	Catalina	CSS	·	1.5 km	MPC · JPL
238893	2005 YE_{94}	—	December 26, 2005	Catalina	CSS	·	950 m	MPC · JPL
238894	2005 YZ_{118}	—	December 26, 2005	Mount Lemmon	Mount Lemmon Survey	(2076)	1.1 km	MPC · JPL
238895	2005 YU_{123}	—	December 24, 2005	Socorro	LINEAR	·	1.1 km	MPC · JPL
238896	2005 YH_{138}	—	December 26, 2005	Kitt Peak	Spacewatch	·	1.5 km	MPC · JPL
238897	2005 YX_{150}	—	December 25, 2005	Kitt Peak	Spacewatch	NYS	980 m	MPC · JPL
238898	2005 YM_{153}	—	December 29, 2005	Catalina	CSS	(2076)	1.0 km	MPC · JPL
238899	2005 YY_{154}	—	December 29, 2005	Kitt Peak	Spacewatch	NYS	1.1 km	MPC · JPL
238900	2005 YT_{163}	—	December 28, 2005	Kitt Peak	Spacewatch	·	990 m	MPC · JPL

== 238901–239000 ==
back to top

Designation			Discovery			Properties		Ref
Permanent	Provisional	Named after	Date	Site	Discoverer(s)	Category	Diam.	Ref
238901	2005 YP_{172}	—	December 23, 2005	Socorro	LINEAR	EUN	2.8 km	MPC · JPL
238902	2005 YO_{184}	—	December 27, 2005	Kitt Peak	Spacewatch	·	900 m	MPC · JPL
238903	2005 YA_{185}	—	December 27, 2005	Catalina	CSS	·	3.6 km	MPC · JPL
238904	2005 YH_{187}	—	December 28, 2005	Kitt Peak	Spacewatch	·	1.1 km	MPC · JPL
238905	2005 YE_{192}	—	December 30, 2005	Kitt Peak	Spacewatch	NYS	1.1 km	MPC · JPL
238906	2005 YA_{193}	—	December 30, 2005	Kitt Peak	Spacewatch	·	1.2 km	MPC · JPL
238907	2005 YD_{205}	—	December 26, 2005	Mount Lemmon	Mount Lemmon Survey	·	1.1 km	MPC · JPL
238908	2005 YT_{227}	—	December 25, 2005	Kitt Peak	Spacewatch	NYS ·	1.7 km	MPC · JPL
238909	2005 YH_{269}	—	December 25, 2005	Mount Lemmon	Mount Lemmon Survey	V	1.0 km	MPC · JPL
238910	2005 YN_{269}	—	December 25, 2005	Mount Lemmon	Mount Lemmon Survey	·	1.7 km	MPC · JPL
238911	2006 AJ_{6}	—	January 3, 2006	Socorro	LINEAR	·	1.6 km	MPC · JPL
238912	2006 AB_{9}	—	January 2, 2006	Catalina	CSS	·	2.2 km	MPC · JPL
238913	2006 AE_{9}	—	January 3, 2006	Socorro	LINEAR	·	1.7 km	MPC · JPL
238914	2006 AR_{12}	—	January 4, 2006	Mount Lemmon	Mount Lemmon Survey	SUL	2.0 km	MPC · JPL
238915	2006 AA_{15}	—	January 5, 2006	Mount Lemmon	Mount Lemmon Survey	·	1.4 km	MPC · JPL
238916	2006 AE_{16}	—	January 4, 2006	Kitt Peak	Spacewatch	NYS	860 m	MPC · JPL
238917	2006 AR_{24}	—	January 5, 2006	Kitt Peak	Spacewatch	·	1.2 km	MPC · JPL
238918	2006 AW_{26}	—	January 5, 2006	Catalina	CSS	·	830 m	MPC · JPL
238919	2006 AD_{29}	—	January 6, 2006	Anderson Mesa	LONEOS	·	1.5 km	MPC · JPL
238920	2006 AJ_{37}	—	January 4, 2006	Kitt Peak	Spacewatch	MAS	960 m	MPC · JPL
238921	2006 AQ_{37}	—	January 4, 2006	Kitt Peak	Spacewatch	·	2.0 km	MPC · JPL
238922	2006 AR_{41}	—	January 5, 2006	Anderson Mesa	LONEOS	·	1.4 km	MPC · JPL
238923	2006 AG_{43}	—	January 6, 2006	Kitt Peak	Spacewatch	NYS	1.1 km	MPC · JPL
238924	2006 AN_{57}	—	January 8, 2006	Mount Lemmon	Mount Lemmon Survey	V	980 m	MPC · JPL
238925	2006 AQ_{59}	—	January 5, 2006	Kitt Peak	Spacewatch	·	1.2 km	MPC · JPL
238926	2006 AT_{76}	—	January 5, 2006	Mount Lemmon	Mount Lemmon Survey	·	1.3 km	MPC · JPL
238927	2006 AX_{82}	—	January 10, 2006	Kitt Peak	Spacewatch	·	1.1 km	MPC · JPL
238928	2006 AQ_{83}	—	January 5, 2006	Catalina	CSS	·	1.6 km	MPC · JPL
238929	2006 AZ_{83}	—	January 5, 2006	Anderson Mesa	LONEOS	·	1.4 km	MPC · JPL
238930	2006 AY_{84}	—	January 6, 2006	Anderson Mesa	LONEOS	·	2.6 km	MPC · JPL
238931	2006 AZ_{85}	—	January 12, 2006	Palomar	NEAT	NYS	2.1 km	MPC · JPL
238932	2006 AF_{90}	—	January 6, 2006	Mount Lemmon	Mount Lemmon Survey	·	1.2 km	MPC · JPL
238933	2006 AP_{96}	—	January 7, 2006	Anderson Mesa	LONEOS	·	1.6 km	MPC · JPL
238934	2006 AU_{100}	—	January 6, 2006	Mount Lemmon	Mount Lemmon Survey	·	1.3 km	MPC · JPL
238935	2006 AW_{100}	—	January 7, 2006	Mount Lemmon	Mount Lemmon Survey	·	1.3 km	MPC · JPL
238936	2006 BE_{6}	—	January 20, 2006	Catalina	CSS	·	1.7 km	MPC · JPL
238937	2006 BY_{6}	—	January 20, 2006	Kitt Peak	Spacewatch	MAS	760 m	MPC · JPL
238938	2006 BH_{11}	—	January 20, 2006	Kitt Peak	Spacewatch	ERI	2.5 km	MPC · JPL
238939	2006 BJ_{13}	—	January 22, 2006	Anderson Mesa	LONEOS	·	2.1 km	MPC · JPL
238940	2006 BC_{17}	—	January 22, 2006	Anderson Mesa	LONEOS	V	940 m	MPC · JPL
238941	2006 BJ_{17}	—	January 22, 2006	Mount Lemmon	Mount Lemmon Survey	·	1.6 km	MPC · JPL
238942	2006 BU_{17}	—	January 22, 2006	Mount Lemmon	Mount Lemmon Survey	MAS	710 m	MPC · JPL
238943	2006 BV_{19}	—	January 22, 2006	Anderson Mesa	LONEOS	·	2.2 km	MPC · JPL
238944	2006 BD_{24}	—	January 23, 2006	Mount Lemmon	Mount Lemmon Survey	MAS	850 m	MPC · JPL
238945	2006 BT_{25}	—	January 22, 2006	Anderson Mesa	LONEOS	V	990 m	MPC · JPL
238946	2006 BE_{26}	—	January 22, 2006	Anderson Mesa	LONEOS	NYS	1.6 km	MPC · JPL
238947	2006 BT_{33}	—	January 21, 2006	Kitt Peak	Spacewatch	·	1.7 km	MPC · JPL
238948	2006 BA_{38}	—	January 23, 2006	Kitt Peak	Spacewatch	MAS	940 m	MPC · JPL
238949	2006 BL_{43}	—	January 23, 2006	Kitt Peak	Spacewatch	NYS	1.6 km	MPC · JPL
238950	2006 BD_{44}	—	January 23, 2006	Kitt Peak	Spacewatch	MAS	960 m	MPC · JPL
238951	2006 BW_{53}	—	January 25, 2006	Kitt Peak	Spacewatch	NYS	1.4 km	MPC · JPL
238952	2006 BS_{60}	—	January 26, 2006	Kitt Peak	Spacewatch	NYS	1.6 km	MPC · JPL
238953	2006 BG_{68}	—	January 23, 2006	Kitt Peak	Spacewatch	·	1.4 km	MPC · JPL
238954	2006 BJ_{80}	—	January 23, 2006	Kitt Peak	Spacewatch	·	2.7 km	MPC · JPL
238955	2006 BC_{81}	—	January 23, 2006	Kitt Peak	Spacewatch	NYS	1.8 km	MPC · JPL
238956	2006 BD_{83}	—	January 24, 2006	Socorro	LINEAR	·	2.0 km	MPC · JPL
238957	2006 BB_{90}	—	January 25, 2006	Kitt Peak	Spacewatch	V	820 m	MPC · JPL
238958	2006 BF_{94}	—	January 26, 2006	Kitt Peak	Spacewatch	NYS	1.5 km	MPC · JPL
238959	2006 BK_{94}	—	January 26, 2006	Kitt Peak	Spacewatch	·	1.2 km	MPC · JPL
238960	2006 BS_{100}	—	January 30, 2006	Marly	Observatoire Naef	·	2.0 km	MPC · JPL
238961	2006 BC_{102}	—	January 23, 2006	Mount Lemmon	Mount Lemmon Survey	·	1.4 km	MPC · JPL
238962	2006 BB_{103}	—	January 23, 2006	Mount Lemmon	Mount Lemmon Survey	·	1.8 km	MPC · JPL
238963	2006 BJ_{115}	—	January 26, 2006	Kitt Peak	Spacewatch	·	1.2 km	MPC · JPL
238964	2006 BJ_{117}	—	January 26, 2006	Kitt Peak	Spacewatch	·	1.5 km	MPC · JPL
238965	2006 BK_{125}	—	January 26, 2006	Kitt Peak	Spacewatch	·	2.5 km	MPC · JPL
238966	2006 BB_{127}	—	January 26, 2006	Kitt Peak	Spacewatch	MAS	760 m	MPC · JPL
238967	2006 BN_{130}	—	January 26, 2006	Kitt Peak	Spacewatch	V	810 m	MPC · JPL
238968	2006 BH_{142}	—	January 26, 2006	Kitt Peak	Spacewatch	NYS	1.4 km	MPC · JPL
238969	2006 BE_{148}	—	January 31, 2006	Kitt Peak	Spacewatch	·	2.1 km	MPC · JPL
238970	2006 BU_{151}	—	January 25, 2006	Kitt Peak	Spacewatch	NYS	1.6 km	MPC · JPL
238971	2006 BK_{154}	—	January 25, 2006	Kitt Peak	Spacewatch	·	1.3 km	MPC · JPL
238972	2006 BN_{154}	—	January 25, 2006	Kitt Peak	Spacewatch	PAD	3.3 km	MPC · JPL
238973	2006 BW_{156}	—	January 25, 2006	Kitt Peak	Spacewatch	NYS	1.6 km	MPC · JPL
238974	2006 BN_{157}	—	January 25, 2006	Kitt Peak	Spacewatch	·	1.6 km	MPC · JPL
238975	2006 BE_{163}	—	January 26, 2006	Mount Lemmon	Mount Lemmon Survey	·	1.1 km	MPC · JPL
238976	2006 BX_{164}	—	January 26, 2006	Kitt Peak	Spacewatch	·	1.6 km	MPC · JPL
238977	2006 BL_{180}	—	January 27, 2006	Mount Lemmon	Mount Lemmon Survey	·	1.1 km	MPC · JPL
238978	2006 BO_{189}	—	January 28, 2006	Kitt Peak	Spacewatch	NYS	1.2 km	MPC · JPL
238979	2006 BT_{189}	—	January 28, 2006	Kitt Peak	Spacewatch	·	1.6 km	MPC · JPL
238980	2006 BL_{195}	—	January 30, 2006	Kitt Peak	Spacewatch	V	800 m	MPC · JPL
238981	2006 BZ_{205}	—	January 31, 2006	Mount Lemmon	Mount Lemmon Survey	NYS	1.1 km	MPC · JPL
238982	2006 BG_{208}	—	January 31, 2006	Catalina	CSS	·	1.6 km	MPC · JPL
238983	2006 BT_{211}	—	January 31, 2006	Kitt Peak	Spacewatch	MAS	1.0 km	MPC · JPL
238984	2006 BZ_{216}	—	January 26, 2006	Catalina	CSS	·	1.5 km	MPC · JPL
238985	2006 BY_{225}	—	January 30, 2006	Kitt Peak	Spacewatch	·	1.3 km	MPC · JPL
238986	2006 BS_{226}	—	January 30, 2006	Kitt Peak	Spacewatch	·	2.2 km	MPC · JPL
238987	2006 BO_{227}	—	January 30, 2006	Kitt Peak	Spacewatch	·	2.3 km	MPC · JPL
238988	2006 BV_{238}	—	January 31, 2006	Mount Lemmon	Mount Lemmon Survey	·	2.5 km	MPC · JPL
238989	2006 BD_{248}	—	January 31, 2006	Kitt Peak	Spacewatch	EUN	1.2 km	MPC · JPL
238990	2006 BH_{252}	—	January 31, 2006	Kitt Peak	Spacewatch	NYS	1.5 km	MPC · JPL
238991	2006 BB_{253}	—	January 31, 2006	Kitt Peak	Spacewatch	·	1.6 km	MPC · JPL
238992	2006 BH_{260}	—	January 31, 2006	Kitt Peak	Spacewatch	CLA	3.2 km	MPC · JPL
238993	2006 BK_{263}	—	January 31, 2006	Kitt Peak	Spacewatch	·	1.3 km	MPC · JPL
238994	2006 BF_{266}	—	January 31, 2006	Kitt Peak	Spacewatch	·	1.5 km	MPC · JPL
238995	2006 BK_{266}	—	January 31, 2006	Kitt Peak	Spacewatch	(5)	2.1 km	MPC · JPL
238996	2006 BO_{274}	—	January 30, 2006	Kitt Peak	Spacewatch	·	1.6 km	MPC · JPL
238997	2006 CQ_{7}	—	February 1, 2006	Mount Lemmon	Mount Lemmon Survey	·	1.4 km	MPC · JPL
238998	2006 CG_{36}	—	February 2, 2006	Mount Lemmon	Mount Lemmon Survey	·	1.8 km	MPC · JPL
238999	2006 CJ_{41}	—	February 2, 2006	Kitt Peak	Spacewatch	·	1.4 km	MPC · JPL
239000	2006 CB_{44}	—	February 2, 2006	Kitt Peak	Spacewatch	·	2.2 km	MPC · JPL

back to top

== See also ==
- Meanings of minor-planet names: 238001–239000
