= Meanings of minor-planet names: 238001–239000 =

As minor planet discoveries are confirmed, they are given a permanent number by the IAU's Minor Planet Center (MPC), and the discoverers can then submit names for them, following the IAU's naming conventions. The list below concerns those minor planets in the specified number-range that have received names, and explains the meanings of those names.

Official naming citations of newly named small Solar System bodies are approved and published in a bulletin by IAU's Working Group for Small Bodies Nomenclature (WGSBN). Before May 2021, citations were published in MPC's Minor Planet Circulars for many decades. Recent citations can also be found on the JPL Small-Body Database (SBDB). Until his death in 2016, German astronomer Lutz D. Schmadel compiled these citations into the Dictionary of Minor Planet Names (DMP) and regularly updated the collection.

Based on Paul Herget's The Names of the Minor Planets, Schmadel also researched the unclear origin of numerous asteroids, most of which had been named prior to World War II. This article incorporates text from this source, which is in the public domain: SBDB New namings may only be added to this list below after official publication as the preannouncement of names is condemned. The WGSBN publishes a comprehensive guideline for the naming rules of non-cometary small Solar System bodies.

== 238001–238100 ==
Named minor planet	Provisional	This minor planet was named for...	Ref · Catalog
There are no named minor planets in this number range

== 238101–238200 ==
back to top

Named minor planet	Provisional	This minor planet was named for...	Ref · Catalog
238129 Bernardwolfe	2003 QK_{31}	Bernard Wolfe (1915–1985), an American science-fiction writer.	JPL · 238129

== 238201–238300 ==
back to top

Named minor planet	Provisional	This minor planet was named for...	Ref · Catalog
There are no named minor planets in this number range

== 238301–238400 ==
back to top

Named minor planet	Provisional	This minor planet was named for...	Ref · Catalog
There are no named minor planets in this number range

== 238401–238500 ==
back to top

Named minor planet	Provisional	This minor planet was named for...	Ref · Catalog
There are no named minor planets in this number range

== 238501–238600 ==
back to top

Named minor planet	Provisional	This minor planet was named for...	Ref · Catalog
238593 Paysdegex	2005 AS	The French astronomy club Orion is situated in Pays de Gex, near Geneva.	JPL · 238593

== 238601–238700 ==
back to top

Named minor planet	Provisional	This minor planet was named for...	Ref · Catalog
There are no named minor planets in this number range

== 238701–238800 ==
back to top

Named minor planet	Provisional	This minor planet was named for...	Ref · Catalog
238710 Halassy	2005 GW_{21}	Olivér Halassy (1909–1946), a Hungarian water polo player and freestyle swimmer, who won two gold and one silver medal in three Summer Olympic Games between 1928 and 1936.	JPL · 238710
238771 Juhászbalázs	2005 JB_{94}	Balázs Juhász (1992–2012), Hungarian astronomer who died during his night assistant work at the Konkoly Observatory	JPL · 238771

== 238801–238900 ==
back to top

Named minor planet	Provisional	This minor planet was named for...	Ref · Catalog
238817 Titeuf	2005 PQ_{16}	Titeuf is the title of a comic strip and the name of its teenage hero, created by Swiss cartoonist Philippe Chappuis (born 1967), better known as Zep.	JPL · 238817

== 238901–239000 ==
back to top

Named minor planet	Provisional	This minor planet was named for...	Ref · Catalog
There are no named minor planets in this number range

back to top

Preceded by 237,001–238,000	Meanings of minor-planet names List of minor planets: 238,001–239,000	Succeeded by 239,001–240,000
