= Meanings of minor-planet names: 240001–241000 =

As minor planet discoveries are confirmed, they are given a permanent number by the IAU's Minor Planet Center (MPC), and the discoverers can then submit names for them, following the IAU's naming conventions. The list below concerns those minor planets in the specified number-range that have received names, and explains the meanings of those names.

Official naming citations of newly named small Solar System bodies are approved and published in a bulletin by IAU's Working Group for Small Bodies Nomenclature (WGSBN). Before May 2021, citations were published in MPC's Minor Planet Circulars for many decades. Recent citations can also be found on the JPL Small-Body Database (SBDB). Until his death in 2016, German astronomer Lutz D. Schmadel compiled these citations into the Dictionary of Minor Planet Names (DMP) and regularly updated the collection.

Based on Paul Herget's The Names of the Minor Planets, Schmadel also researched the unclear origin of numerous asteroids, most of which had been named prior to World War II. This article incorporates text from this source, which is in the public domain: SBDB New namings may only be added to this list below after official publication as the preannouncement of names is condemned. The WGSBN publishes a comprehensive guideline for the naming rules of non-cometary small Solar System bodies.

== 240001–240100 ==
Named minor planet	Provisional	This minor planet was named for...	Ref · Catalog
240021 Radzo	2001 TX_{257}	Jozef Radzo (born 1949) is a teacher of mathematics and physics at Gymnázium A. Bernoláka secondary school in Senec, Slovakia, where he established modern physics and chemistry laboratories. From 1973 to 1993, he worked in Gymnázium Šamor{í}n, where he encouraged S. Kürti's interest in astronomy.	JPL · 240021
240022 Demitra	2001 TR_{258}	Pavol Demitra (1974–2011), Slovak ice-hockey player	JPL · 240022

== 240101–240200 ==
back to top

Named minor planet	Provisional	This minor planet was named for...	Ref · Catalog
There are no named minor planets in this number range

== 240201–240300 ==
back to top

Named minor planet	Provisional	This minor planet was named for...	Ref · Catalog
There are no named minor planets in this number range

== 240301–240400 ==
back to top

Named minor planet	Provisional	This minor planet was named for...	Ref · Catalog
240364 Kozmutza	2003 SQ_{129}	Flóra Kozmutza (1905–1995) was a Hungarian educator, psychologist and high school teacher.	JPL · 240364
240381 Emilchyne	2003 SB_{317}	Yemilchyne Raion (translit. Emil'chyns'kyi), a district in northern Ukraine, birthplace of Baikonur engineer Vladimir Khilchenko (born 1931) and folk singer Nina Matviyenko (born 1947)	JPL · 240381

== 240401–240500 ==
back to top

Named minor planet	Provisional	This minor planet was named for...	Ref · Catalog
There are no named minor planets in this number range

== 240501–240600 ==
back to top

Named minor planet	Provisional	This minor planet was named for...	Ref · Catalog
There are no named minor planets in this number range

== 240601–240700 ==
back to top

Named minor planet	Provisional	This minor planet was named for...	Ref · Catalog
240697 Gemenc	2005 GC	Gemenc, a forest and the only remaining tidal area of the Danube in Hungary.	JPL · 240697

== 240701–240800 ==
back to top

Named minor planet	Provisional	This minor planet was named for...	Ref · Catalog
240725 Scipioni	2005 GX_{190}	Francesca Scipioni (born 1983), Italian planetary and data scientist.	JPL · 240725
240757 Farkasberci	2005 KS_{8}	Bertalan "Berci" Farkas (born 1949), the first Hungarian cosmonaut and the first Esperantist in space.	JPL · 240757

== 240801–240900 ==
back to top

Named minor planet	Provisional	This minor planet was named for...	Ref · Catalog
240871 MOSS	2006 DA	The Morocco Oukaimeden Sky Survey (MOSS) is an international amateur sky survey established in 2011. The Swiss–French–Moroccan partnership uses a 0.5-meter remote telescope at the Oukaïmeden Observatory (J43), located in the Moroccan High Atlas mountain range (Src, Src, Src).	JPL · 240871

== 240901–241000 ==
back to top

Named minor planet	Provisional	This minor planet was named for...	Ref · Catalog
There are no named minor planets in this number range

back to top

Preceded by 239,001–240,000	Meanings of minor-planet names List of minor planets: 240,001–241,000	Succeeded by 241,001–242,000
