= List of minor planets: 240001–241000 =

The following is a partial list of minor planets, running from minor-planet number 240001 through 241000, inclusive. The primary data for this and other partial lists is based on JPL's "Small-Body Orbital Elements" and data available from the Minor Planet Center. Critical list information is also provided by the MPC, unless otherwise specified from Lowell Observatory. A detailed description of the table's columns and additional sources are given on the main page including a complete list of every page in this series, and a statistical break-up on the dynamical classification of minor planets.

Also see the summary list of all named bodies in numerical and alphabetical order, and the corresponding naming citations for the number range of this particular list. New namings may only be added to this list after official publication, as the preannouncement of names is condemned by the Working Group for Small Bodies Nomenclature of the International Astronomical Union.

Near-Earth obj.	MBA (inner)	MBA (outer)	Centaur
Mars-crosser	MBA (middle)	Jupiter trojan	Trans-Neptunian obj.
Unclassified

== 240001–240100 ==
Designation			Discovery			Properties		Ref
Permanent	Provisional	Named after	Date	Site	Discoverer(s)	Category	Diam.	Ref
240001	2001 SC_{273}	—	September 26, 2001	Palomar	NEAT	H	1.0 km	MPC · JPL
240002	2001 SB_{300}	—	September 20, 2001	Socorro	LINEAR	·	2.0 km	MPC · JPL
240003	2001 SU_{313}	—	September 21, 2001	Socorro	LINEAR	EOS	2.8 km	MPC · JPL
240004	2001 SN_{351}	—	September 18, 2001	Apache Point	SDSS	·	3.7 km	MPC · JPL
240005	2001 TY_{22}	—	October 13, 2001	Socorro	LINEAR	·	5.7 km	MPC · JPL
240006	2001 TC_{23}	—	October 13, 2001	Socorro	LINEAR	·	770 m	MPC · JPL
240007	2001 TQ_{47}	—	October 14, 2001	Cima Ekar	ADAS	·	3.5 km	MPC · JPL
240008	2001 TL_{52}	—	October 13, 2001	Socorro	LINEAR	·	3.2 km	MPC · JPL
240009	2001 TC_{62}	—	October 13, 2001	Socorro	LINEAR	·	920 m	MPC · JPL
240010	2001 TK_{142}	—	October 10, 2001	Palomar	NEAT	·	3.1 km	MPC · JPL
240011	2001 TW_{143}	—	October 10, 2001	Palomar	NEAT	·	1.2 km	MPC · JPL
240012	2001 TA_{145}	—	October 10, 2001	Palomar	NEAT	·	1.3 km	MPC · JPL
240013	2001 TM_{149}	—	October 10, 2001	Palomar	NEAT	PHO	1.2 km	MPC · JPL
240014	2001 TF_{154}	—	October 15, 2001	Palomar	NEAT	·	3.9 km	MPC · JPL
240015	2001 TN_{161}	—	October 11, 2001	Palomar	NEAT	·	2.0 km	MPC · JPL
240016	2001 TU_{164}	—	October 11, 2001	Palomar	NEAT	HYG	3.9 km	MPC · JPL
240017	2001 TU_{199}	—	October 11, 2001	Socorro	LINEAR	EOS	2.8 km	MPC · JPL
240018	2001 TD_{233}	—	October 15, 2001	Palomar	NEAT	·	950 m	MPC · JPL
240019	2001 TM_{241}	—	October 10, 2001	Kitt Peak	Spacewatch	·	4.1 km	MPC · JPL
240020	2001 TA_{250}	—	October 14, 2001	Apache Point	SDSS	·	3.9 km	MPC · JPL
240021 Radzo	2001 TX_{257}	Radzo	October 8, 2001	Palomar	NEAT	·	6.8 km	MPC · JPL
240022 Demitra	2001 TR_{258}	Demitra	October 15, 2001	Palomar	NEAT	VER	3.9 km	MPC · JPL
240023	2001 UJ_{20}	—	October 16, 2001	Palomar	NEAT	·	760 m	MPC · JPL
240024	2001 UM_{39}	—	October 17, 2001	Socorro	LINEAR	·	2.8 km	MPC · JPL
240025	2001 UG_{52}	—	October 17, 2001	Socorro	LINEAR	·	3.9 km	MPC · JPL
240026	2001 UN_{62}	—	October 17, 2001	Socorro	LINEAR	·	2.6 km	MPC · JPL
240027	2001 UB_{63}	—	October 17, 2001	Socorro	LINEAR	·	850 m	MPC · JPL
240028	2001 UZ_{66}	—	October 20, 2001	Socorro	LINEAR	·	1.0 km	MPC · JPL
240029	2001 UY_{69}	—	October 17, 2001	Kitt Peak	Spacewatch	·	990 m	MPC · JPL
240030	2001 UY_{82}	—	October 20, 2001	Socorro	LINEAR	·	1.1 km	MPC · JPL
240031	2001 UA_{93}	—	October 19, 2001	Palomar	NEAT	·	3.3 km	MPC · JPL
240032	2001 UP_{99}	—	October 17, 2001	Socorro	LINEAR	·	3.8 km	MPC · JPL
240033	2001 UL_{100}	—	October 17, 2001	Socorro	LINEAR	·	910 m	MPC · JPL
240034	2001 UZ_{108}	—	October 20, 2001	Socorro	LINEAR	·	1.1 km	MPC · JPL
240035	2001 UR_{110}	—	October 21, 2001	Socorro	LINEAR	·	5.6 km	MPC · JPL
240036	2001 UU_{115}	—	October 22, 2001	Socorro	LINEAR	·	1.2 km	MPC · JPL
240037	2001 UX_{115}	—	October 22, 2001	Socorro	LINEAR	·	1.2 km	MPC · JPL
240038	2001 US_{116}	—	October 22, 2001	Socorro	LINEAR	·	970 m	MPC · JPL
240039	2001 UC_{117}	—	October 22, 2001	Socorro	LINEAR	·	7.3 km	MPC · JPL
240040	2001 UG_{132}	—	October 20, 2001	Socorro	LINEAR	·	3.4 km	MPC · JPL
240041	2001 UQ_{177}	—	October 21, 2001	Socorro	LINEAR	V	890 m	MPC · JPL
240042	2001 UP_{194}	—	October 18, 2001	Palomar	NEAT	NYS	1.1 km	MPC · JPL
240043	2001 UB_{195}	—	October 18, 2001	Palomar	NEAT	PHO	1.2 km	MPC · JPL
240044	2001 UX_{214}	—	October 23, 2001	Socorro	LINEAR	·	1.6 km	MPC · JPL
240045	2001 UV_{224}	—	October 18, 2001	Palomar	NEAT	URS	3.5 km	MPC · JPL
240046	2001 VC_{18}	—	November 9, 2001	Socorro	LINEAR	·	4.0 km	MPC · JPL
240047	2001 VF_{106}	—	November 12, 2001	Socorro	LINEAR	·	1.0 km	MPC · JPL
240048	2001 WM_{3}	—	November 16, 2001	Kitt Peak	Spacewatch	EOS	3.1 km	MPC · JPL
240049	2001 WH_{13}	—	November 17, 2001	Socorro	LINEAR	·	4.5 km	MPC · JPL
240050	2001 WM_{23}	—	November 16, 2001	Kitt Peak	Spacewatch	·	3.1 km	MPC · JPL
240051	2001 WP_{29}	—	November 17, 2001	Socorro	LINEAR	·	1.6 km	MPC · JPL
240052	2001 WE_{31}	—	November 17, 2001	Socorro	LINEAR	URS	5.1 km	MPC · JPL
240053	2001 WB_{34}	—	November 17, 2001	Socorro	LINEAR	·	4.8 km	MPC · JPL
240054	2001 WC_{36}	—	November 17, 2001	Socorro	LINEAR	·	2.5 km	MPC · JPL
240055	2001 WK_{37}	—	November 17, 2001	Socorro	LINEAR	EUP	5.4 km	MPC · JPL
240056	2001 WP_{38}	—	November 17, 2001	Socorro	LINEAR	PHO	2.4 km	MPC · JPL
240057	2001 WY_{72}	—	November 20, 2001	Socorro	LINEAR	·	5.4 km	MPC · JPL
240058	2001 WM_{81}	—	November 20, 2001	Socorro	LINEAR	·	3.3 km	MPC · JPL
240059	2001 XT_{13}	—	December 9, 2001	Socorro	LINEAR	·	3.5 km	MPC · JPL
240060	2001 XW_{49}	—	December 10, 2001	Socorro	LINEAR	·	1.1 km	MPC · JPL
240061	2001 XT_{69}	—	December 11, 2001	Socorro	LINEAR	VER	5.2 km	MPC · JPL
240062	2001 XD_{95}	—	December 10, 2001	Socorro	LINEAR	·	1.3 km	MPC · JPL
240063	2001 XP_{96}	—	December 10, 2001	Socorro	LINEAR	·	3.7 km	MPC · JPL
240064	2001 XY_{139}	—	December 14, 2001	Socorro	LINEAR	HYG	3.9 km	MPC · JPL
240065	2001 XX_{161}	—	December 14, 2001	Socorro	LINEAR	NYS	1.3 km	MPC · JPL
240066	2001 XV_{180}	—	December 14, 2001	Socorro	LINEAR	·	6.4 km	MPC · JPL
240067	2001 XH_{225}	—	December 15, 2001	Socorro	LINEAR	·	5.4 km	MPC · JPL
240068	2001 XM_{263}	—	December 14, 2001	Socorro	LINEAR	·	4.2 km	MPC · JPL
240069	2001 YY_{6}	—	December 17, 2001	Socorro	LINEAR	·	1.1 km	MPC · JPL
240070	2001 YS_{22}	—	December 18, 2001	Socorro	LINEAR	·	1.7 km	MPC · JPL
240071	2001 YD_{97}	—	December 17, 2001	Socorro	LINEAR	·	6.7 km	MPC · JPL
240072	2001 YP_{109}	—	December 18, 2001	Socorro	LINEAR	H	680 m	MPC · JPL
240073	2001 YF_{162}	—	December 16, 2001	Palomar	NEAT	V	1.1 km	MPC · JPL
240074	2002 AZ_{37}	—	January 9, 2002	Socorro	LINEAR	·	1.3 km	MPC · JPL
240075	2002 AE_{52}	—	January 9, 2002	Socorro	LINEAR	·	1.7 km	MPC · JPL
240076	2002 AC_{56}	—	January 9, 2002	Socorro	LINEAR	NYS	1.4 km	MPC · JPL
240077	2002 AJ_{70}	—	January 8, 2002	Socorro	LINEAR	·	1.8 km	MPC · JPL
240078	2002 AL_{101}	—	January 8, 2002	Socorro	LINEAR	NYS	1.3 km	MPC · JPL
240079	2002 AE_{126}	—	January 12, 2002	Socorro	LINEAR	·	1.2 km	MPC · JPL
240080	2002 AR_{133}	—	January 9, 2002	Socorro	LINEAR	·	2.5 km	MPC · JPL
240081	2002 AB_{144}	—	January 13, 2002	Socorro	LINEAR	·	1.3 km	MPC · JPL
240082	2002 AW_{169}	—	January 14, 2002	Socorro	LINEAR	·	1.5 km	MPC · JPL
240083	2002 AL_{176}	—	January 14, 2002	Socorro	LINEAR	·	1.6 km	MPC · JPL
240084	2002 AT_{185}	—	January 8, 2002	Socorro	LINEAR	·	1.4 km	MPC · JPL
240085	2002 AB_{190}	—	January 11, 2002	Kitt Peak	Spacewatch	·	5.7 km	MPC · JPL
240086	2002 AK_{200}	—	January 9, 2002	Socorro	LINEAR	·	6.5 km	MPC · JPL
240087	2002 AE_{202}	—	January 12, 2002	Palomar	NEAT	NYS	1.4 km	MPC · JPL
240088	2002 AD_{206}	—	January 13, 2002	Apache Point	SDSS	·	3.9 km	MPC · JPL
240089	2002 BH_{21}	—	January 25, 2002	Socorro	LINEAR	H	780 m	MPC · JPL
240090	2002 BR_{27}	—	January 20, 2002	Anderson Mesa	LONEOS	·	2.1 km	MPC · JPL
240091	2002 CN_{19}	—	February 4, 2002	Palomar	NEAT	V	1.1 km	MPC · JPL
240092	2002 CV_{28}	—	February 6, 2002	Socorro	LINEAR	V	1.1 km	MPC · JPL
240093	2002 CA_{52}	—	February 12, 2002	Desert Eagle	W. K. Y. Yeung	EUP	9.8 km	MPC · JPL
240094	2002 CG_{69}	—	February 7, 2002	Socorro	LINEAR	·	1.3 km	MPC · JPL
240095	2002 CL_{76}	—	February 7, 2002	Socorro	LINEAR	·	1.8 km	MPC · JPL
240096	2002 CE_{77}	—	February 7, 2002	Socorro	LINEAR	·	1.9 km	MPC · JPL
240097	2002 CG_{92}	—	February 7, 2002	Socorro	LINEAR	·	1.2 km	MPC · JPL
240098	2002 CP_{96}	—	February 7, 2002	Socorro	LINEAR	·	1.8 km	MPC · JPL
240099	2002 CB_{120}	—	February 7, 2002	Socorro	LINEAR	·	1.4 km	MPC · JPL
240100	2002 CE_{131}	—	February 7, 2002	Socorro	LINEAR	·	5.1 km	MPC · JPL

== 240101–240200 ==
back to top

Designation			Discovery			Properties		Ref
Permanent	Provisional	Named after	Date	Site	Discoverer(s)	Category	Diam.	Ref
240101	2002 CL_{137}	—	February 8, 2002	Socorro	LINEAR	·	1.6 km	MPC · JPL
240102	2002 CH_{172}	—	February 8, 2002	Socorro	LINEAR	·	2.0 km	MPC · JPL
240103	2002 CW_{182}	—	February 10, 2002	Socorro	LINEAR	·	1.4 km	MPC · JPL
240104	2002 CA_{183}	—	February 10, 2002	Socorro	LINEAR	V	1.0 km	MPC · JPL
240105	2002 CL_{185}	—	February 10, 2002	Socorro	LINEAR	·	1.2 km	MPC · JPL
240106	2002 CT_{201}	—	February 10, 2002	Socorro	LINEAR	MAS	950 m	MPC · JPL
240107	2002 CZ_{215}	—	February 10, 2002	Socorro	LINEAR	·	2.1 km	MPC · JPL
240108	2002 CD_{225}	—	February 14, 2002	Bergisch Gladbach	W. Bickel	MAS	770 m	MPC · JPL
240109	2002 CT_{243}	—	February 11, 2002	Socorro	LINEAR	EUN	1.8 km	MPC · JPL
240110	2002 CW_{252}	—	February 4, 2002	Haleakala	NEAT	·	1.5 km	MPC · JPL
240111	2002 CP_{260}	—	February 7, 2002	Palomar	NEAT	·	1.5 km	MPC · JPL
240112	2002 CB_{310}	—	February 6, 2002	Palomar	NEAT	V	920 m	MPC · JPL
240113	2002 CC_{311}	—	February 10, 2002	Socorro	LINEAR	·	1.6 km	MPC · JPL
240114	2002 EJ	—	March 3, 2002	Socorro	LINEAR	H	830 m	MPC · JPL
240115	2002 EB_{25}	—	March 10, 2002	Kitt Peak	Spacewatch	·	1.2 km	MPC · JPL
240116	2002 EQ_{52}	—	March 9, 2002	Socorro	LINEAR	MAS	1.1 km	MPC · JPL
240117	2002 EU_{57}	—	March 13, 2002	Socorro	LINEAR	NYS	1.4 km	MPC · JPL
240118	2002 ET_{97}	—	March 12, 2002	Socorro	LINEAR	·	2.8 km	MPC · JPL
240119	2002 EO_{98}	—	March 13, 2002	Socorro	LINEAR	·	1.8 km	MPC · JPL
240120	2002 EE_{127}	—	March 12, 2002	Palomar	NEAT	H	700 m	MPC · JPL
240121	2002 ED_{154}	—	March 9, 2002	Socorro	LINEAR	·	2.0 km	MPC · JPL
240122	2002 ED_{156}	—	March 11, 2002	Cima Ekar	ADAS	·	1.7 km	MPC · JPL
240123	2002 FD_{24}	—	March 18, 2002	Kitt Peak	Spacewatch	·	2.2 km	MPC · JPL
240124	2002 GK_{5}	—	April 11, 2002	Socorro	LINEAR	H	700 m	MPC · JPL
240125	2002 GK_{6}	—	April 13, 2002	Palomar	NEAT	HNS	1.8 km	MPC · JPL
240126	2002 GU_{36}	—	April 2, 2002	Palomar	NEAT	·	2.2 km	MPC · JPL
240127	2002 GX_{119}	—	April 12, 2002	Palomar	NEAT	·	3.4 km	MPC · JPL
240128	2002 GM_{141}	—	April 13, 2002	Palomar	NEAT	·	1.3 km	MPC · JPL
240129	2002 GY_{143}	—	April 13, 2002	Palomar	NEAT	·	3.8 km	MPC · JPL
240130	2002 GZ_{152}	—	April 12, 2002	Palomar	NEAT	H	730 m	MPC · JPL
240131	2002 GJ_{164}	—	April 14, 2002	Palomar	NEAT	·	1.7 km	MPC · JPL
240132	2002 JD	—	May 3, 2002	Eskridge	Farpoint	H	950 m	MPC · JPL
240133	2002 JU_{9}	—	May 6, 2002	Socorro	LINEAR	H	820 m	MPC · JPL
240134	2002 JC_{34}	—	May 9, 2002	Socorro	LINEAR	T_{j} (2.98) · 3:2	6.8 km	MPC · JPL
240135	2002 JN_{36}	—	May 9, 2002	Socorro	LINEAR	·	1.9 km	MPC · JPL
240136	2002 JG_{51}	—	May 9, 2002	Socorro	LINEAR	EUN	1.8 km	MPC · JPL
240137	2002 JK_{63}	—	May 9, 2002	Socorro	LINEAR	·	3.3 km	MPC · JPL
240138	2002 JR_{63}	—	May 9, 2002	Socorro	LINEAR	·	3.4 km	MPC · JPL
240139	2002 JT_{74}	—	May 9, 2002	Socorro	LINEAR	·	1.4 km	MPC · JPL
240140	2002 JN_{102}	—	May 9, 2002	Socorro	LINEAR	·	1.8 km	MPC · JPL
240141	2002 JW_{103}	—	May 10, 2002	Socorro	LINEAR	·	3.3 km	MPC · JPL
240142	2002 JW_{105}	—	May 12, 2002	Socorro	LINEAR	·	2.0 km	MPC · JPL
240143	2002 JS_{110}	—	May 11, 2002	Socorro	LINEAR	·	1.8 km	MPC · JPL
240144	2002 JB_{114}	—	May 15, 2002	Haleakala	NEAT	·	1.7 km	MPC · JPL
240145	2002 JH_{115}	—	May 6, 2002	Socorro	LINEAR	H	840 m	MPC · JPL
240146	2002 JF_{116}	—	May 5, 2002	Socorro	LINEAR	H	940 m	MPC · JPL
240147	2002 JC_{135}	—	May 9, 2002	Palomar	NEAT	RAF	1.1 km	MPC · JPL
240148	2002 JS_{143}	—	May 13, 2002	Palomar	NEAT	H	820 m	MPC · JPL
240149	2002 JK_{146}	—	May 15, 2002	Haleakala	NEAT	·	1.5 km	MPC · JPL
240150	2002 LL_{9}	—	June 5, 2002	Socorro	LINEAR	EUN	2.5 km	MPC · JPL
240151	2002 LY_{43}	—	June 10, 2002	Socorro	LINEAR	·	4.2 km	MPC · JPL
240152	2002 NX_{16}	—	July 13, 2002	Reedy Creek	J. Broughton	BRG	2.7 km	MPC · JPL
240153	2002 NZ_{22}	—	July 9, 2002	Socorro	LINEAR	·	2.4 km	MPC · JPL
240154	2002 NJ_{37}	—	July 9, 2002	Socorro	LINEAR	RAF	1.4 km	MPC · JPL
240155	2002 NA_{50}	—	July 13, 2002	Haleakala	NEAT	·	1.5 km	MPC · JPL
240156	2002 NB_{62}	—	July 5, 2002	Palomar	NEAT	·	2.1 km	MPC · JPL
240157	2002 NY_{70}	—	July 9, 2002	Palomar	NEAT	·	2.1 km	MPC · JPL
240158	2002 OH_{30}	—	July 18, 2002	Palomar	NEAT	·	3.5 km	MPC · JPL
240159	2002 OJ_{30}	—	July 29, 2002	Palomar	NEAT	·	1.9 km	MPC · JPL
240160	2002 PO_{9}	—	August 5, 2002	Palomar	NEAT	·	2.5 km	MPC · JPL
240161	2002 PU_{25}	—	August 6, 2002	Palomar	NEAT	DOR	3.6 km	MPC · JPL
240162	2002 PT_{31}	—	August 6, 2002	Palomar	NEAT	EUN	1.4 km	MPC · JPL
240163	2002 PG_{33}	—	August 5, 2002	Campo Imperatore	CINEOS	NEM	2.8 km	MPC · JPL
240164	2002 PE_{97}	—	August 14, 2002	Socorro	LINEAR	·	3.8 km	MPC · JPL
240165	2002 PQ_{105}	—	August 12, 2002	Socorro	LINEAR	EUN	1.8 km	MPC · JPL
240166	2002 PA_{111}	—	August 13, 2002	Anderson Mesa	LONEOS	·	3.4 km	MPC · JPL
240167	2002 PP_{112}	—	August 9, 2002	Haleakala	NEAT	·	4.7 km	MPC · JPL
240168	2002 PU_{120}	—	August 13, 2002	Anderson Mesa	LONEOS	LEO	1.7 km	MPC · JPL
240169	2002 PM_{128}	—	August 14, 2002	Socorro	LINEAR	·	1.7 km	MPC · JPL
240170	2002 PY_{174}	—	August 15, 2002	Palomar	NEAT	·	3.9 km	MPC · JPL
240171	2002 PM_{179}	—	August 8, 2002	Palomar	NEAT	·	1.9 km	MPC · JPL
240172	2002 PC_{180}	—	August 8, 2002	Palomar	NEAT	·	3.6 km	MPC · JPL
240173	2002 PH_{181}	—	August 15, 2002	Palomar	NEAT	·	2.2 km	MPC · JPL
240174	2002 PK_{188}	—	August 8, 2002	Palomar	NEAT	·	1.7 km	MPC · JPL
240175	2002 PK_{191}	—	August 14, 2002	Palomar	NEAT	·	2.1 km	MPC · JPL
240176	2002 QJ_{12}	—	August 26, 2002	Palomar	NEAT	·	2.1 km	MPC · JPL
240177	2002 QB_{18}	—	August 28, 2002	Palomar	NEAT	·	2.7 km	MPC · JPL
240178	2002 QN_{34}	—	August 29, 2002	Palomar	NEAT	AGN	1.8 km	MPC · JPL
240179	2002 QH_{43}	—	August 30, 2002	Palomar	NEAT	·	1.8 km	MPC · JPL
240180	2002 QT_{46}	—	August 27, 2002	Palomar	NEAT	·	2.4 km	MPC · JPL
240181	2002 QD_{55}	—	August 29, 2002	Palomar	S. F. Hönig	·	2.3 km	MPC · JPL
240182	2002 QH_{70}	—	August 19, 2002	Palomar	NEAT	·	2.2 km	MPC · JPL
240183	2002 QA_{74}	—	August 19, 2002	Palomar	NEAT	·	1.9 km	MPC · JPL
240184	2002 QE_{76}	—	August 16, 2002	Palomar	NEAT	·	5.6 km	MPC · JPL
240185	2002 QQ_{97}	—	August 26, 2002	Palomar	NEAT	·	1.8 km	MPC · JPL
240186	2002 QT_{100}	—	August 19, 2002	Palomar	NEAT	WIT	1.4 km	MPC · JPL
240187	2002 QV_{101}	—	August 20, 2002	Palomar	NEAT	·	2.3 km	MPC · JPL
240188	2002 QC_{103}	—	August 19, 2002	Palomar	NEAT	·	2.4 km	MPC · JPL
240189	2002 QO_{103}	—	August 18, 2002	Palomar	NEAT	HOF	3.3 km	MPC · JPL
240190	2002 QC_{104}	—	August 26, 2002	Palomar	NEAT	·	2.3 km	MPC · JPL
240191	2002 QW_{111}	—	August 27, 2002	Palomar	NEAT	·	5.4 km	MPC · JPL
240192	2002 QX_{123}	—	August 27, 2002	Palomar	NEAT	AGN	1.5 km	MPC · JPL
240193	2002 QJ_{127}	—	August 30, 2002	Palomar	NEAT	·	2.5 km	MPC · JPL
240194	2002 RG_{2}	—	September 4, 2002	Anderson Mesa	LONEOS	·	3.1 km	MPC · JPL
240195	2002 RL_{20}	—	September 4, 2002	Anderson Mesa	LONEOS	(21344)	2.2 km	MPC · JPL
240196	2002 RW_{23}	—	September 4, 2002	Anderson Mesa	LONEOS	EOS	2.5 km	MPC · JPL
240197	2002 RZ_{35}	—	September 5, 2002	Anderson Mesa	LONEOS	·	2.8 km	MPC · JPL
240198	2002 RC_{54}	—	September 5, 2002	Socorro	LINEAR	·	2.4 km	MPC · JPL
240199	2002 RN_{75}	—	September 5, 2002	Socorro	LINEAR	GEF	2.5 km	MPC · JPL
240200	2002 RX_{96}	—	September 5, 2002	Socorro	LINEAR	·	2.5 km	MPC · JPL

== 240201–240300 ==
back to top

Designation			Discovery			Properties		Ref
Permanent	Provisional	Named after	Date	Site	Discoverer(s)	Category	Diam.	Ref
240201	2002 RW_{124}	—	September 9, 2002	Palomar	NEAT	(5)	2.5 km	MPC · JPL
240202	2002 RH_{133}	—	September 9, 2002	Haleakala	NEAT	·	4.5 km	MPC · JPL
240203	2002 RB_{142}	—	September 11, 2002	Palomar	NEAT	·	3.5 km	MPC · JPL
240204	2002 RV_{144}	—	September 11, 2002	Palomar	NEAT	·	2.5 km	MPC · JPL
240205	2002 RO_{186}	—	September 12, 2002	Palomar	NEAT	·	3.3 km	MPC · JPL
240206	2002 RB_{218}	—	September 14, 2002	Haleakala	NEAT	·	3.2 km	MPC · JPL
240207	2002 RT_{226}	—	September 14, 2002	Palomar	NEAT	WIT	1.4 km	MPC · JPL
240208	2002 RC_{236}	—	September 12, 2002	Palomar	R. Matson	·	3.1 km	MPC · JPL
240209	2002 RP_{256}	—	September 4, 2002	Palomar	NEAT	·	3.5 km	MPC · JPL
240210	2002 RB_{258}	—	September 14, 2002	Palomar	NEAT	PAD	1.5 km	MPC · JPL
240211	2002 RG_{265}	—	September 15, 2002	Palomar	NEAT	·	5.3 km	MPC · JPL
240212	2002 RF_{278}	—	September 4, 2002	Palomar	NEAT	·	2.1 km	MPC · JPL
240213	2002 SU_{15}	—	September 27, 2002	Palomar	NEAT	·	3.5 km	MPC · JPL
240214	2002 SM_{25}	—	September 28, 2002	Haleakala	NEAT	·	4.6 km	MPC · JPL
240215	2002 SY_{42}	—	September 28, 2002	Haleakala	NEAT	·	2.4 km	MPC · JPL
240216	2002 SD_{43}	—	September 28, 2002	Haleakala	NEAT	·	3.2 km	MPC · JPL
240217	2002 SX_{44}	—	September 29, 2002	Eskridge	Farpoint	·	4.7 km	MPC · JPL
240218	2002 SD_{47}	—	September 30, 2002	Socorro	LINEAR	·	5.9 km	MPC · JPL
240219	2002 SE_{55}	—	September 30, 2002	Socorro	LINEAR	·	2.9 km	MPC · JPL
240220	2002 SC_{60}	—	September 16, 2002	Palomar	NEAT	·	2.8 km	MPC · JPL
240221	2002 SU_{67}	—	September 26, 2002	Palomar	NEAT	·	3.9 km	MPC · JPL
240222	2002 TY_{3}	—	October 1, 2002	Anderson Mesa	LONEOS	·	6.0 km	MPC · JPL
240223	2002 TC_{21}	—	October 2, 2002	Socorro	LINEAR	·	2.2 km	MPC · JPL
240224	2002 TM_{35}	—	October 2, 2002	Socorro	LINEAR	·	5.3 km	MPC · JPL
240225	2002 TD_{50}	—	October 2, 2002	Socorro	LINEAR	·	3.6 km	MPC · JPL
240226	2002 TO_{66}	—	October 3, 2002	Socorro	LINEAR	·	5.8 km	MPC · JPL
240227	2002 TQ_{77}	—	October 1, 2002	Anderson Mesa	LONEOS	·	3.4 km	MPC · JPL
240228	2002 TL_{82}	—	October 2, 2002	Socorro	LINEAR	AEG	4.8 km	MPC · JPL
240229	2002 TC_{116}	—	October 3, 2002	Palomar	NEAT	JUN	2.1 km	MPC · JPL
240230	2002 TC_{141}	—	October 5, 2002	Kitt Peak	Spacewatch	THM	2.4 km	MPC · JPL
240231	2002 TA_{142}	—	October 5, 2002	Palomar	NEAT	·	6.3 km	MPC · JPL
240232	2002 TS_{168}	—	October 3, 2002	Palomar	NEAT	·	7.0 km	MPC · JPL
240233	2002 TC_{170}	—	October 3, 2002	Palomar	NEAT	·	4.5 km	MPC · JPL
240234	2002 TA_{195}	—	October 3, 2002	Socorro	LINEAR	·	2.7 km	MPC · JPL
240235	2002 TB_{207}	—	October 4, 2002	Socorro	LINEAR	·	3.0 km	MPC · JPL
240236	2002 TF_{252}	—	October 8, 2002	Anderson Mesa	LONEOS	·	2.7 km	MPC · JPL
240237	2002 TU_{259}	—	October 9, 2002	Socorro	LINEAR	EOS	2.8 km	MPC · JPL
240238	2002 TB_{268}	—	October 9, 2002	Socorro	LINEAR	·	4.7 km	MPC · JPL
240239	2002 TZ_{269}	—	October 9, 2002	Socorro	LINEAR	(5)	3.4 km	MPC · JPL
240240	2002 TA_{283}	—	October 10, 2002	Socorro	LINEAR	·	5.8 km	MPC · JPL
240241	2002 TY_{334}	—	October 5, 2002	Apache Point	SDSS	·	2.6 km	MPC · JPL
240242	2002 TR_{377}	—	October 4, 2002	Palomar	NEAT	·	3.9 km	MPC · JPL
240243	2002 TA_{383}	—	October 15, 2002	Palomar	NEAT	EOS	2.5 km	MPC · JPL
240244	2002 US_{8}	—	October 28, 2002	Palomar	NEAT	·	4.8 km	MPC · JPL
240245	2002 UH_{14}	—	October 29, 2002	Palomar	NEAT	·	3.3 km	MPC · JPL
240246	2002 UW_{16}	—	October 30, 2002	Haleakala	NEAT	·	3.3 km	MPC · JPL
240247	2002 UP_{24}	—	October 29, 2002	Kitt Peak	Spacewatch	·	5.0 km	MPC · JPL
240248	2002 UP_{31}	—	October 30, 2002	Haleakala	NEAT	EOS	3.7 km	MPC · JPL
240249	2002 UG_{48}	—	October 31, 2002	Socorro	LINEAR	·	1.5 km	MPC · JPL
240250	2002 UZ_{54}	—	October 29, 2002	Apache Point	SDSS	·	4.3 km	MPC · JPL
240251	2002 UH_{61}	—	October 30, 2002	Apache Point	SDSS	·	2.9 km	MPC · JPL
240252	2002 UJ_{75}	—	October 31, 2002	Palomar	NEAT	·	3.3 km	MPC · JPL
240253	2002 VT_{10}	—	November 1, 2002	Palomar	NEAT	·	2.9 km	MPC · JPL
240254	2002 VN_{18}	—	November 2, 2002	Kvistaberg	Uppsala-DLR Asteroid Survey	(5)	2.2 km	MPC · JPL
240255	2002 VF_{41}	—	November 4, 2002	Palomar	NEAT	·	4.0 km	MPC · JPL
240256	2002 VJ_{52}	—	November 6, 2002	Anderson Mesa	LONEOS	·	3.4 km	MPC · JPL
240257	2002 VB_{54}	—	November 6, 2002	Socorro	LINEAR	·	4.0 km	MPC · JPL
240258	2002 VW_{67}	—	November 7, 2002	Anderson Mesa	LONEOS	·	5.4 km	MPC · JPL
240259	2002 VL_{90}	—	November 11, 2002	Kitt Peak	Spacewatch	slow	5.0 km	MPC · JPL
240260	2002 VD_{93}	—	November 11, 2002	Socorro	LINEAR	·	3.5 km	MPC · JPL
240261	2002 VH_{94}	—	November 12, 2002	Socorro	LINEAR	EUN	2.6 km	MPC · JPL
240262	2002 VW_{103}	—	November 12, 2002	Socorro	LINEAR	·	7.7 km	MPC · JPL
240263	2002 VM_{118}	—	November 11, 2002	Socorro	LINEAR	·	5.6 km	MPC · JPL
240264	2002 WL_{1}	—	November 23, 2002	Palomar	NEAT	·	3.5 km	MPC · JPL
240265	2002 WY_{1}	—	November 23, 2002	Palomar	NEAT	EOS	3.2 km	MPC · JPL
240266	2002 WR_{29}	—	November 22, 2002	Palomar	NEAT	VER	5.3 km	MPC · JPL
240267	2002 XU_{5}	—	December 1, 2002	Socorro	LINEAR	·	3.2 km	MPC · JPL
240268	2002 XR_{10}	—	December 3, 2002	Palomar	NEAT	·	3.7 km	MPC · JPL
240269	2002 XH_{20}	—	December 2, 2002	Socorro	LINEAR	EUP	7.8 km	MPC · JPL
240270	2002 XE_{45}	—	December 8, 2002	Haleakala	NEAT	·	3.4 km	MPC · JPL
240271	2002 XL_{47}	—	December 9, 2002	Kitt Peak	Spacewatch	TIR ·	4.4 km	MPC · JPL
240272	2002 XU_{90}	—	December 15, 2002	Haleakala	NEAT	TIR	4.5 km	MPC · JPL
240273	2002 XB_{99}	—	December 5, 2002	Socorro	LINEAR	·	1.7 km	MPC · JPL
240274	2002 XF_{99}	—	December 5, 2002	Socorro	LINEAR	·	2.8 km	MPC · JPL
240275	2002 XN_{120}	—	December 3, 2002	Palomar	NEAT	·	3.1 km	MPC · JPL
240276	2002 YT_{4}	—	December 27, 2002	Socorro	LINEAR	PHO	1.4 km	MPC · JPL
240277	2002 YY_{10}	—	December 31, 2002	Socorro	LINEAR	·	6.3 km	MPC · JPL
240278	2003 AJ_{12}	—	January 1, 2003	Socorro	LINEAR	·	4.1 km	MPC · JPL
240279	2003 AR_{16}	—	January 5, 2003	Socorro	LINEAR	EUP	7.2 km	MPC · JPL
240280	2003 BC_{8}	—	January 26, 2003	Anderson Mesa	LONEOS	ELF	6.4 km	MPC · JPL
240281	2003 BO_{44}	—	January 27, 2003	Socorro	LINEAR	·	810 m	MPC · JPL
240282	2003 BK_{84}	—	January 30, 2003	Anderson Mesa	LONEOS	DOR	3.9 km	MPC · JPL
240283	2003 CV_{11}	—	February 1, 2003	Socorro	LINEAR	·	5.5 km	MPC · JPL
240284	2003 DU_{19}	—	February 22, 2003	Palomar	NEAT	(883)	1.0 km	MPC · JPL
240285	2003 ET_{1}	—	March 4, 2003	St. Véran	St. Veran	·	2.0 km	MPC · JPL
240286	2003 EN_{19}	—	March 6, 2003	Anderson Mesa	LONEOS	·	5.8 km	MPC · JPL
240287	2003 EQ_{25}	—	March 6, 2003	Anderson Mesa	LONEOS	·	880 m	MPC · JPL
240288	2003 EZ_{27}	—	March 6, 2003	Socorro	LINEAR	·	1.1 km	MPC · JPL
240289	2003 EM_{28}	—	March 6, 2003	Socorro	LINEAR	·	1.1 km	MPC · JPL
240290	2003 EY_{51}	—	March 11, 2003	Palomar	NEAT	·	870 m	MPC · JPL
240291	2003 EO_{52}	—	March 8, 2003	Anderson Mesa	LONEOS	EUP	7.5 km	MPC · JPL
240292	2003 EB_{54}	—	March 11, 2003	Palomar	NEAT	·	1.4 km	MPC · JPL
240293	2003 EN_{60}	—	March 12, 2003	Socorro	LINEAR	·	1.5 km	MPC · JPL
240294	2003 EX_{61}	—	March 12, 2003	Kitt Peak	Spacewatch	·	800 m	MPC · JPL
240295	2003 FK_{2}	—	March 23, 2003	Ondřejov	L. Kotková	·	4.6 km	MPC · JPL
240296	2003 FJ_{4}	—	March 24, 2003	Socorro	LINEAR	PHO	2.6 km	MPC · JPL
240297	2003 FB_{15}	—	March 23, 2003	Catalina	CSS	·	1.2 km	MPC · JPL
240298	2003 FZ_{27}	—	March 24, 2003	Kitt Peak	Spacewatch	·	960 m	MPC · JPL
240299	2003 FG_{54}	—	March 25, 2003	Haleakala	NEAT	·	1.5 km	MPC · JPL
240300	2003 FE_{60}	—	March 26, 2003	Palomar	NEAT	·	1.1 km	MPC · JPL

== 240301–240400 ==
back to top

Designation			Discovery			Properties		Ref
Permanent	Provisional	Named after	Date	Site	Discoverer(s)	Category	Diam.	Ref
240301	2003 FK_{67}	—	March 26, 2003	Palomar	NEAT	·	910 m	MPC · JPL
240302	2003 FK_{79}	—	March 27, 2003	Kitt Peak	Spacewatch	·	1.1 km	MPC · JPL
240303	2003 FZ_{83}	—	March 28, 2003	Kitt Peak	Spacewatch	·	1.4 km	MPC · JPL
240304	2003 FS_{84}	—	March 28, 2003	Kitt Peak	Spacewatch	·	1.2 km	MPC · JPL
240305	2003 FO_{91}	—	March 29, 2003	Anderson Mesa	LONEOS	·	980 m	MPC · JPL
240306	2003 FY_{93}	—	March 29, 2003	Anderson Mesa	LONEOS	LIX	6.5 km	MPC · JPL
240307	2003 FH_{99}	—	March 30, 2003	Socorro	LINEAR	·	1.3 km	MPC · JPL
240308	2003 FP_{100}	—	March 31, 2003	Anderson Mesa	LONEOS	·	1.3 km	MPC · JPL
240309	2003 FY_{103}	—	March 24, 2003	Kitt Peak	Spacewatch	·	980 m	MPC · JPL
240310	2003 FF_{116}	—	March 22, 2003	Palomar	NEAT	VER	5.1 km	MPC · JPL
240311	2003 GP_{9}	—	April 2, 2003	Socorro	LINEAR	·	1.1 km	MPC · JPL
240312	2003 GJ_{11}	—	April 3, 2003	Anderson Mesa	LONEOS	·	770 m	MPC · JPL
240313	2003 GO_{35}	—	April 9, 2003	Socorro	LINEAR	·	980 m	MPC · JPL
240314	2003 GP_{38}	—	April 7, 2003	Kitt Peak	Spacewatch	·	980 m	MPC · JPL
240315	2003 HV	—	April 21, 2003	Kitt Peak	Spacewatch	·	1.9 km	MPC · JPL
240316	2003 HV_{14}	—	April 26, 2003	Haleakala	NEAT	·	1.3 km	MPC · JPL
240317	2003 HS_{17}	—	April 25, 2003	Kitt Peak	Spacewatch	·	950 m	MPC · JPL
240318	2003 HW_{26}	—	April 27, 2003	Anderson Mesa	LONEOS	·	1.2 km	MPC · JPL
240319	2003 HU_{37}	—	April 28, 2003	Anderson Mesa	LONEOS	·	2.7 km	MPC · JPL
240320	2003 HS_{42}	—	April 29, 2003	Socorro	LINEAR	AMO	310 m	MPC · JPL
240321	2003 JC_{10}	—	May 1, 2003	Socorro	LINEAR	·	1.3 km	MPC · JPL
240322	2003 KM_{17}	—	May 26, 2003	Haleakala	NEAT	·	1.5 km	MPC · JPL
240323	2003 KG_{18}	—	May 28, 2003	Kitt Peak	Spacewatch	·	1.3 km	MPC · JPL
240324	2003 KK_{36}	—	May 30, 2003	Socorro	LINEAR	·	1.8 km	MPC · JPL
240325	2003 LB	—	June 1, 2003	Kitt Peak	Spacewatch	·	2.9 km	MPC · JPL
240326	2003 ML	—	June 21, 2003	Nashville	Clingan, R.	·	1.1 km	MPC · JPL
240327	2003 MX_{4}	—	June 26, 2003	Socorro	LINEAR	·	1.5 km	MPC · JPL
240328	2003 MJ_{10}	—	June 29, 2003	Reedy Creek	J. Broughton	ERI	2.4 km	MPC · JPL
240329	2003 NV_{4}	—	July 4, 2003	Reedy Creek	J. Broughton	·	1.5 km	MPC · JPL
240330	2003 NL_{13}	—	July 6, 2003	Kitt Peak	Spacewatch	·	1.8 km	MPC · JPL
240331	2003 OX_{3}	—	July 22, 2003	Campo Imperatore	CINEOS	MAS	980 m	MPC · JPL
240332	2003 OH_{4}	—	July 21, 2003	Campo Imperatore	CINEOS	·	1.7 km	MPC · JPL
240333	2003 OE_{21}	—	July 25, 2003	Socorro	LINEAR	·	1.3 km	MPC · JPL
240334	2003 OH_{28}	—	July 24, 2003	Palomar	NEAT	·	1.4 km	MPC · JPL
240335	2003 PC_{2}	—	August 2, 2003	Haleakala	NEAT	V	1.0 km	MPC · JPL
240336	2003 PD_{11}	—	August 7, 2003	Haleakala	NEAT	·	2.3 km	MPC · JPL
240337	2003 QE_{19}	—	August 22, 2003	Palomar	NEAT	·	1.5 km	MPC · JPL
240338	2003 QJ_{24}	—	August 21, 2003	Palomar	NEAT	NYS	1.6 km	MPC · JPL
240339	2003 QQ_{24}	—	August 21, 2003	Campo Imperatore	CINEOS	·	1.7 km	MPC · JPL
240340	2003 QH_{49}	—	August 22, 2003	Palomar	NEAT	·	1.1 km	MPC · JPL
240341	2003 QE_{52}	—	August 23, 2003	Palomar	NEAT	(5)	2.3 km	MPC · JPL
240342	2003 QE_{65}	—	August 23, 2003	Palomar	NEAT	H	780 m	MPC · JPL
240343	2003 QY_{66}	—	August 23, 2003	Palomar	NEAT	NYS	1.6 km	MPC · JPL
240344	2003 QP_{67}	—	August 24, 2003	Socorro	LINEAR	·	1.7 km	MPC · JPL
240345	2003 QG_{72}	—	August 23, 2003	Palomar	NEAT	·	2.0 km	MPC · JPL
240346	2003 QT_{87}	—	August 25, 2003	Socorro	LINEAR	·	1.6 km	MPC · JPL
240347	2003 QO_{93}	—	August 28, 2003	Haleakala	NEAT	NYS	1.6 km	MPC · JPL
240348	2003 QA_{94}	—	August 28, 2003	Haleakala	NEAT	·	1.5 km	MPC · JPL
240349	2003 QG_{99}	—	August 30, 2003	Haleakala	NEAT	·	2.7 km	MPC · JPL
240350	2003 QW_{110}	—	August 31, 2003	Socorro	LINEAR	·	2.3 km	MPC · JPL
240351	2003 RV_{2}	—	September 1, 2003	Socorro	LINEAR	NYS	1.4 km	MPC · JPL
240352	2003 RP_{3}	—	September 1, 2003	Socorro	LINEAR	·	1.8 km	MPC · JPL
240353	2003 SR_{4}	—	September 16, 2003	Palomar	NEAT	NYS	1.2 km	MPC · JPL
240354	2003 ST_{5}	—	September 16, 2003	Kitt Peak	Spacewatch	ADE ·	2.8 km	MPC · JPL
240355	2003 SQ_{13}	—	September 16, 2003	Kitt Peak	Spacewatch	·	3.6 km	MPC · JPL
240356	2003 SR_{22}	—	September 16, 2003	Kitt Peak	Spacewatch	MRX	1.6 km	MPC · JPL
240357	2003 SY_{39}	—	September 16, 2003	Palomar	NEAT	·	3.0 km	MPC · JPL
240358	2003 SA_{46}	—	September 16, 2003	Anderson Mesa	LONEOS	NYS	1.5 km	MPC · JPL
240359	2003 SF_{46}	—	September 16, 2003	Anderson Mesa	LONEOS	·	1.7 km	MPC · JPL
240360	2003 SU_{60}	—	September 17, 2003	Kitt Peak	Spacewatch	·	1.9 km	MPC · JPL
240361	2003 SU_{110}	—	September 20, 2003	Palomar	NEAT	EUN	1.9 km	MPC · JPL
240362	2003 SN_{116}	—	September 16, 2003	Socorro	LINEAR	·	1.9 km	MPC · JPL
240363	2003 SV_{128}	—	September 20, 2003	Kitt Peak	Spacewatch	RAF	1.8 km	MPC · JPL
240364 Kozmutza	2003 SQ_{129}	Kozmutza	September 20, 2003	Piszkéstető	K. Sárneczky, B. Sipőcz	MAS	810 m	MPC · JPL
240365	2003 SR_{146}	—	September 20, 2003	Palomar	NEAT	·	3.0 km	MPC · JPL
240366	2003 SO_{147}	—	September 21, 2003	Kitt Peak	Spacewatch	slow	4.5 km	MPC · JPL
240367	2003 SF_{169}	—	September 23, 2003	Haleakala	NEAT	·	1.7 km	MPC · JPL
240368	2003 SQ_{169}	—	September 23, 2003	Haleakala	NEAT	NYS	1.2 km	MPC · JPL
240369	2003 SY_{201}	—	September 18, 2003	Kitt Peak	Spacewatch	·	1.5 km	MPC · JPL
240370	2003 SS_{219}	—	September 28, 2003	Desert Eagle	W. K. Y. Yeung	·	2.7 km	MPC · JPL
240371	2003 SZ_{220}	—	September 19, 2003	Kitt Peak	Spacewatch	·	3.1 km	MPC · JPL
240372	2003 SS_{222}	—	September 30, 2003	Drebach	Drebach	H	730 m	MPC · JPL
240373	2003 SU_{236}	—	September 26, 2003	Socorro	LINEAR	·	2.1 km	MPC · JPL
240374	2003 ST_{245}	—	September 26, 2003	Socorro	LINEAR	·	1.7 km	MPC · JPL
240375	2003 SO_{250}	—	September 26, 2003	Socorro	LINEAR	·	1.9 km	MPC · JPL
240376	2003 SG_{251}	—	September 26, 2003	Socorro	LINEAR	·	2.3 km	MPC · JPL
240377	2003 SR_{255}	—	September 27, 2003	Kitt Peak	Spacewatch	H	720 m	MPC · JPL
240378	2003 SZ_{256}	—	September 28, 2003	Kitt Peak	Spacewatch	·	1.4 km	MPC · JPL
240379	2003 SG_{290}	—	September 28, 2003	Anderson Mesa	LONEOS	·	1.9 km	MPC · JPL
240380	2003 SE_{293}	—	September 27, 2003	Socorro	LINEAR	·	1.4 km	MPC · JPL
240381 Emilchyne	2003 SB_{317}	Emilchyne	September 29, 2003	Andrushivka	Andrushivka	·	1.5 km	MPC · JPL
240382	2003 SC_{320}	—	September 16, 2003	Kitt Peak	Spacewatch	·	1.4 km	MPC · JPL
240383	2003 SX_{321}	—	September 26, 2003	Apache Point	SDSS	·	2.3 km	MPC · JPL
240384	2003 SJ_{327}	—	September 18, 2003	Kitt Peak	Spacewatch	BRA	2.5 km	MPC · JPL
240385	2003 TV_{3}	—	October 1, 2003	Fountain Hills	C. W. Juels, P. R. Holvorcem	·	2.7 km	MPC · JPL
240386	2003 TB_{46}	—	October 3, 2003	Kitt Peak	Spacewatch	·	2.6 km	MPC · JPL
240387	2003 TV_{58}	—	October 5, 2003	Socorro	LINEAR	(18466)	2.7 km	MPC · JPL
240388	2003 UN_{13}	—	October 18, 2003	Palomar	NEAT	H	860 m	MPC · JPL
240389	2003 UE_{14}	—	October 16, 2003	Anderson Mesa	LONEOS	·	2.1 km	MPC · JPL
240390	2003 UA_{16}	—	October 16, 2003	Anderson Mesa	LONEOS	·	1.4 km	MPC · JPL
240391	2003 UJ_{34}	—	October 17, 2003	Kitt Peak	Spacewatch	·	2.6 km	MPC · JPL
240392	2003 UE_{41}	—	October 16, 2003	Anderson Mesa	LONEOS	·	2.6 km	MPC · JPL
240393	2003 UF_{66}	—	October 16, 2003	Palomar	NEAT	·	3.5 km	MPC · JPL
240394	2003 UU_{73}	—	October 17, 2003	Kitt Peak	Spacewatch	H	600 m	MPC · JPL
240395	2003 UY_{75}	—	October 17, 2003	Kitt Peak	Spacewatch	·	2.3 km	MPC · JPL
240396	2003 UR_{94}	—	October 18, 2003	Kitt Peak	Spacewatch	·	2.2 km	MPC · JPL
240397	2003 UB_{102}	—	October 20, 2003	Socorro	LINEAR	·	3.7 km	MPC · JPL
240398	2003 UB_{121}	—	October 18, 2003	Kitt Peak	Spacewatch	·	2.5 km	MPC · JPL
240399	2003 UB_{123}	—	October 19, 2003	Kitt Peak	Spacewatch	WIT	1.2 km	MPC · JPL
240400	2003 UF_{140}	—	October 16, 2003	Anderson Mesa	LONEOS	·	1.6 km	MPC · JPL

== 240401–240500 ==
back to top

Designation			Discovery			Properties		Ref
Permanent	Provisional	Named after	Date	Site	Discoverer(s)	Category	Diam.	Ref
240401	2003 UY_{168}	—	October 22, 2003	Socorro	LINEAR	MIS	4.1 km	MPC · JPL
240402	2003 UF_{175}	—	October 21, 2003	Kitt Peak	Spacewatch	(13314)	3.5 km	MPC · JPL
240403	2003 UK_{182}	—	October 21, 2003	Palomar	NEAT	·	1.3 km	MPC · JPL
240404	2003 UK_{184}	—	October 21, 2003	Palomar	NEAT	·	2.0 km	MPC · JPL
240405	2003 UX_{193}	—	October 20, 2003	Kitt Peak	Spacewatch	·	2.5 km	MPC · JPL
240406	2003 UL_{200}	—	October 21, 2003	Socorro	LINEAR	(5)	1.8 km	MPC · JPL
240407	2003 UV_{203}	—	October 21, 2003	Kitt Peak	Spacewatch	·	3.3 km	MPC · JPL
240408	2003 UU_{229}	—	October 23, 2003	Anderson Mesa	LONEOS	HNS	1.9 km	MPC · JPL
240409	2003 UE_{237}	—	October 23, 2003	Kitt Peak	Spacewatch	·	2.6 km	MPC · JPL
240410	2003 UL_{248}	—	October 25, 2003	Socorro	LINEAR	·	2.8 km	MPC · JPL
240411	2003 UW_{256}	—	October 25, 2003	Socorro	LINEAR	·	1.9 km	MPC · JPL
240412	2003 UH_{258}	—	October 25, 2003	Socorro	LINEAR	GAL	2.5 km	MPC · JPL
240413	2003 UD_{265}	—	October 27, 2003	Socorro	LINEAR	·	1.9 km	MPC · JPL
240414	2003 UN_{304}	—	October 18, 2003	Anderson Mesa	LONEOS	KRM	3.0 km	MPC · JPL
240415	2003 UO_{316}	—	October 25, 2003	Socorro	LINEAR	(18466)	2.9 km	MPC · JPL
240416	2003 UD_{351}	—	October 19, 2003	Apache Point	SDSS	·	1.3 km	MPC · JPL
240417	2003 UR_{365}	—	October 20, 2003	Kitt Peak	Spacewatch	·	2.8 km	MPC · JPL
240418	2003 VO_{5}	—	November 15, 2003	Kitt Peak	Spacewatch	EUN	1.2 km	MPC · JPL
240419	2003 WW	—	November 16, 2003	Catalina	CSS	HOF	4.0 km	MPC · JPL
240420	2003 WT_{8}	—	November 16, 2003	Kitt Peak	Spacewatch	·	2.8 km	MPC · JPL
240421	2003 WJ_{12}	—	November 18, 2003	Palomar	NEAT	·	9.1 km	MPC · JPL
240422	2003 WR_{31}	—	November 18, 2003	Palomar	NEAT	·	1.9 km	MPC · JPL
240423	2003 WJ_{34}	—	November 19, 2003	Kitt Peak	Spacewatch	·	3.3 km	MPC · JPL
240424	2003 WV_{50}	—	November 19, 2003	Kitt Peak	Spacewatch	·	2.1 km	MPC · JPL
240425	2003 WC_{54}	—	November 20, 2003	Kitt Peak	Spacewatch	·	2.3 km	MPC · JPL
240426	2003 WK_{59}	—	November 18, 2003	Kitt Peak	Spacewatch	·	3.0 km	MPC · JPL
240427	2003 WG_{64}	—	November 19, 2003	Kitt Peak	Spacewatch	·	3.3 km	MPC · JPL
240428	2003 WN_{65}	—	November 19, 2003	Kitt Peak	Spacewatch	·	3.2 km	MPC · JPL
240429	2003 WQ_{65}	—	November 19, 2003	Kitt Peak	Spacewatch	·	4.8 km	MPC · JPL
240430	2003 WW_{69}	—	November 19, 2003	Kitt Peak	Spacewatch	·	2.5 km	MPC · JPL
240431	2003 WX_{90}	—	November 18, 2003	Palomar	NEAT	·	3.3 km	MPC · JPL
240432	2003 WD_{96}	—	November 19, 2003	Anderson Mesa	LONEOS	·	3.2 km	MPC · JPL
240433	2003 WY_{118}	—	November 20, 2003	Socorro	LINEAR	LIX	5.3 km	MPC · JPL
240434	2003 WV_{129}	—	November 21, 2003	Socorro	LINEAR	HOF	3.7 km	MPC · JPL
240435	2003 WN_{134}	—	November 21, 2003	Socorro	LINEAR	·	3.1 km	MPC · JPL
240436	2003 WV_{151}	—	November 26, 2003	Kitt Peak	Spacewatch	·	4.1 km	MPC · JPL
240437	2003 WG_{159}	—	November 29, 2003	Socorro	LINEAR	slow	6.5 km	MPC · JPL
240438	2003 WB_{165}	—	November 30, 2003	Kitt Peak	Spacewatch	(5)	1.8 km	MPC · JPL
240439	2003 XH_{11}	—	December 11, 2003	Socorro	LINEAR	·	7.0 km	MPC · JPL
240440	2003 XM_{14}	—	December 1, 2003	Kitt Peak	Spacewatch	·	2.2 km	MPC · JPL
240441	2003 XJ_{43}	—	December 14, 2003	Kitt Peak	Spacewatch	·	1.8 km	MPC · JPL
240442	2003 YB_{9}	—	December 20, 2003	Socorro	LINEAR	H	930 m	MPC · JPL
240443	2003 YU_{9}	—	December 17, 2003	Kitt Peak	Spacewatch	·	3.0 km	MPC · JPL
240444	2003 YB_{11}	—	December 17, 2003	Socorro	LINEAR	EUN	2.4 km	MPC · JPL
240445	2003 YG_{13}	—	December 17, 2003	Anderson Mesa	LONEOS	·	5.6 km	MPC · JPL
240446	2003 YT_{15}	—	December 17, 2003	Socorro	LINEAR	·	3.2 km	MPC · JPL
240447	2003 YV_{15}	—	December 17, 2003	Anderson Mesa	LONEOS	GEF	2.1 km	MPC · JPL
240448	2003 YK_{18}	—	December 17, 2003	Kitt Peak	Spacewatch	·	3.1 km	MPC · JPL
240449	2003 YM_{25}	—	December 18, 2003	Socorro	LINEAR	EUP	5.9 km	MPC · JPL
240450	2003 YY_{25}	—	December 18, 2003	Socorro	LINEAR	·	6.4 km	MPC · JPL
240451	2003 YN_{44}	—	December 19, 2003	Kitt Peak	Spacewatch	·	4.9 km	MPC · JPL
240452	2003 YG_{51}	—	December 18, 2003	Socorro	LINEAR	·	5.4 km	MPC · JPL
240453	2003 YM_{57}	—	December 19, 2003	Socorro	LINEAR	·	4.1 km	MPC · JPL
240454	2003 YG_{61}	—	December 19, 2003	Socorro	LINEAR	·	2.0 km	MPC · JPL
240455	2003 YU_{91}	—	December 21, 2003	Catalina	CSS	H	780 m	MPC · JPL
240456	2003 YJ_{93}	—	December 21, 2003	Socorro	LINEAR	(12739)	2.2 km	MPC · JPL
240457	2003 YU_{103}	—	December 21, 2003	Socorro	LINEAR	·	2.7 km	MPC · JPL
240458	2003 YJ_{115}	—	December 27, 2003	Socorro	LINEAR	·	4.5 km	MPC · JPL
240459	2003 YQ_{119}	—	December 27, 2003	Socorro	LINEAR	EOS	3.3 km	MPC · JPL
240460	2003 YG_{135}	—	December 28, 2003	Socorro	LINEAR	·	4.2 km	MPC · JPL
240461	2003 YC_{136}	—	December 28, 2003	Socorro	LINEAR	·	3.8 km	MPC · JPL
240462	2003 YC_{144}	—	December 28, 2003	Socorro	LINEAR	·	4.8 km	MPC · JPL
240463	2003 YQ_{146}	—	December 28, 2003	Socorro	LINEAR	·	3.9 km	MPC · JPL
240464	2003 YP_{151}	—	December 29, 2003	Catalina	CSS	·	2.1 km	MPC · JPL
240465	2004 BL_{1}	—	January 16, 2004	Kitt Peak	Spacewatch	·	1.6 km	MPC · JPL
240466	2004 BZ_{3}	—	January 16, 2004	Palomar	NEAT	·	2.8 km	MPC · JPL
240467	2004 BM_{29}	—	January 18, 2004	Palomar	NEAT	·	3.8 km	MPC · JPL
240468	2004 BV_{30}	—	January 18, 2004	Palomar	NEAT	·	3.4 km	MPC · JPL
240469	2004 BC_{32}	—	January 19, 2004	Kitt Peak	Spacewatch	·	3.0 km	MPC · JPL
240470	2004 BF_{34}	—	January 19, 2004	Kitt Peak	Spacewatch	·	4.9 km	MPC · JPL
240471	2004 BJ_{35}	—	January 19, 2004	Kitt Peak	Spacewatch	THM	3.3 km	MPC · JPL
240472	2004 BT_{57}	—	January 23, 2004	Anderson Mesa	LONEOS	·	5.7 km	MPC · JPL
240473	2004 BF_{62}	—	January 22, 2004	Socorro	LINEAR	·	2.2 km	MPC · JPL
240474	2004 BT_{62}	—	January 22, 2004	Socorro	LINEAR	KOR	1.9 km	MPC · JPL
240475	2004 BD_{66}	—	January 22, 2004	Socorro	LINEAR	KOR	1.7 km	MPC · JPL
240476	2004 BQ_{74}	—	January 24, 2004	Socorro	LINEAR	·	3.4 km	MPC · JPL
240477	2004 BJ_{75}	—	January 22, 2004	Socorro	LINEAR	·	2.6 km	MPC · JPL
240478	2004 BU_{76}	—	January 25, 2004	Haleakala	NEAT	·	2.5 km	MPC · JPL
240479	2004 BD_{77}	—	January 22, 2004	Socorro	LINEAR	·	1.7 km	MPC · JPL
240480	2004 BB_{89}	—	January 23, 2004	Socorro	LINEAR	·	2.5 km	MPC · JPL
240481	2004 BC_{96}	—	January 30, 2004	Catalina	CSS	·	6.1 km	MPC · JPL
240482	2004 BQ_{96}	—	January 24, 2004	Socorro	LINEAR	·	3.1 km	MPC · JPL
240483	2004 BH_{110}	—	January 28, 2004	Catalina	CSS	·	2.8 km	MPC · JPL
240484	2004 BP_{113}	—	January 28, 2004	Catalina	CSS	·	4.3 km	MPC · JPL
240485	2004 BF_{150}	—	January 17, 2004	Palomar	NEAT	·	4.0 km	MPC · JPL
240486	2004 BU_{156}	—	January 28, 2004	Kitt Peak	Spacewatch	·	2.5 km	MPC · JPL
240487	2004 CM_{22}	—	February 11, 2004	Palomar	NEAT	(1298)	3.6 km	MPC · JPL
240488	2004 CW_{40}	—	February 12, 2004	Palomar	NEAT	·	5.1 km	MPC · JPL
240489	2004 CO_{42}	—	February 11, 2004	Kitt Peak	Spacewatch	·	3.3 km	MPC · JPL
240490	2004 CE_{45}	—	February 13, 2004	Kitt Peak	Spacewatch	·	3.0 km	MPC · JPL
240491	2004 CE_{51}	—	February 2, 2004	Haleakala	NEAT	·	3.4 km	MPC · JPL
240492	2004 CE_{57}	—	February 11, 2004	Palomar	NEAT	·	2.8 km	MPC · JPL
240493	2004 CT_{109}	—	February 13, 2004	Palomar	NEAT	THB	3.2 km	MPC · JPL
240494	2004 DB_{6}	—	February 16, 2004	Kitt Peak	Spacewatch	·	3.1 km	MPC · JPL
240495	2004 DW_{42}	—	February 23, 2004	Socorro	LINEAR	·	3.5 km	MPC · JPL
240496	2004 DX_{57}	—	February 23, 2004	Socorro	LINEAR	·	2.5 km	MPC · JPL
240497	2004 EL_{4}	—	March 11, 2004	Palomar	NEAT	·	5.1 km	MPC · JPL
240498	2004 EY_{6}	—	March 12, 2004	Palomar	NEAT	LIX	3.5 km	MPC · JPL
240499	2004 EN_{10}	—	March 15, 2004	Catalina	CSS	(1298)	5.3 km	MPC · JPL
240500	2004 EX_{19}	—	March 14, 2004	Kitt Peak	Spacewatch	EOS	3.3 km	MPC · JPL

== 240501–240600 ==
back to top

Designation			Discovery			Properties		Ref
Permanent	Provisional	Named after	Date	Site	Discoverer(s)	Category	Diam.	Ref
240501	2004 EK_{22}	—	March 12, 2004	Palomar	NEAT	·	2.3 km	MPC · JPL
240502	2004 EQ_{31}	—	March 14, 2004	Palomar	NEAT	·	5.2 km	MPC · JPL
240503	2004 EH_{52}	—	March 15, 2004	Socorro	LINEAR	·	4.8 km	MPC · JPL
240504	2004 ED_{54}	—	March 15, 2004	Campo Imperatore	CINEOS	·	2.5 km	MPC · JPL
240505	2004 EP_{61}	—	March 12, 2004	Palomar	NEAT	SYL · CYB	6.9 km	MPC · JPL
240506	2004 EV_{63}	—	March 13, 2004	Palomar	NEAT	·	3.0 km	MPC · JPL
240507	2004 EN_{66}	—	March 14, 2004	Socorro	LINEAR	THB	5.3 km	MPC · JPL
240508	2004 EK_{80}	—	March 14, 2004	Socorro	LINEAR	LIX	5.0 km	MPC · JPL
240509	2004 EG_{81}	—	March 15, 2004	Socorro	LINEAR	·	4.8 km	MPC · JPL
240510	2004 EG_{87}	—	March 14, 2004	Kitt Peak	Spacewatch	THM	2.6 km	MPC · JPL
240511	2004 ES_{94}	—	March 15, 2004	Socorro	LINEAR	·	7.0 km	MPC · JPL
240512	2004 EM_{101}	—	March 15, 2004	Kitt Peak	Spacewatch	·	2.5 km	MPC · JPL
240513	2004 EQ_{104}	—	March 15, 2004	Kitt Peak	Spacewatch	·	3.0 km	MPC · JPL
240514	2004 FL_{4}	—	March 19, 2004	Modra	Világi, J.	·	5.8 km	MPC · JPL
240515	2004 FZ_{29}	—	March 22, 2004	Socorro	LINEAR	HYG	3.3 km	MPC · JPL
240516	2004 FN_{31}	—	March 29, 2004	Socorro	LINEAR	T_{j} (2.99) · EUP	5.5 km	MPC · JPL
240517	2004 FL_{54}	—	March 18, 2004	Kitt Peak	Spacewatch	·	4.1 km	MPC · JPL
240518	2004 FY_{55}	—	March 20, 2004	Socorro	LINEAR	·	4.2 km	MPC · JPL
240519	2004 FP_{59}	—	March 18, 2004	Socorro	LINEAR	·	5.0 km	MPC · JPL
240520	2004 FU_{67}	—	March 20, 2004	Socorro	LINEAR	·	3.9 km	MPC · JPL
240521	2004 FZ_{76}	—	March 18, 2004	Socorro	LINEAR	THM	2.4 km	MPC · JPL
240522	2004 FA_{96}	—	March 23, 2004	Socorro	LINEAR	·	3.7 km	MPC · JPL
240523	2004 FG_{104}	—	March 23, 2004	Kitt Peak	Spacewatch	·	2.5 km	MPC · JPL
240524	2004 FC_{112}	—	March 26, 2004	Kitt Peak	Spacewatch	EOS	2.4 km	MPC · JPL
240525	2004 FF_{125}	—	March 27, 2004	Socorro	LINEAR	·	4.5 km	MPC · JPL
240526	2004 FE_{134}	—	March 26, 2004	Anderson Mesa	LONEOS	·	3.4 km	MPC · JPL
240527	2004 FH_{134}	—	March 26, 2004	Socorro	LINEAR	·	4.3 km	MPC · JPL
240528	2004 FY_{135}	—	March 27, 2004	Socorro	LINEAR	·	3.4 km	MPC · JPL
240529	2004 FM_{143}	—	March 28, 2004	Socorro	LINEAR	·	3.5 km	MPC · JPL
240530	2004 FM_{145}	—	March 30, 2004	Kitt Peak	Spacewatch	THM	3.1 km	MPC · JPL
240531	2004 FN_{146}	—	March 29, 2004	Socorro	LINEAR	T_{j} (2.99) · EUP	5.1 km	MPC · JPL
240532	2004 FP_{148}	—	March 29, 2004	Socorro	LINEAR	·	5.4 km	MPC · JPL
240533	2004 FM_{160}	—	March 18, 2004	Socorro	LINEAR	VER	3.7 km	MPC · JPL
240534	2004 GH_{7}	—	April 12, 2004	Kitt Peak	Spacewatch	·	2.9 km	MPC · JPL
240535	2004 GC_{25}	—	April 14, 2004	Kitt Peak	Spacewatch	·	4.2 km	MPC · JPL
240536	2004 GK_{28}	—	April 14, 2004	Socorro	LINEAR	·	4.1 km	MPC · JPL
240537	2004 GU_{46}	—	April 12, 2004	Kitt Peak	Spacewatch	·	4.9 km	MPC · JPL
240538	2004 GX_{46}	—	April 12, 2004	Kitt Peak	Spacewatch	·	3.5 km	MPC · JPL
240539	2004 GY_{47}	—	April 12, 2004	Kitt Peak	Spacewatch	·	4.7 km	MPC · JPL
240540	2004 GN_{77}	—	April 14, 2004	Catalina	CSS	·	4.3 km	MPC · JPL
240541	2004 HC_{17}	—	April 16, 2004	Socorro	LINEAR	·	3.7 km	MPC · JPL
240542	2004 HW_{36}	—	April 19, 2004	Socorro	LINEAR	·	6.9 km	MPC · JPL
240543	2004 HQ_{55}	—	April 24, 2004	Catalina	CSS	·	4.7 km	MPC · JPL
240544	2004 NC_{27}	—	July 11, 2004	Socorro	LINEAR	·	1.0 km	MPC · JPL
240545	2004 PB_{45}	—	August 7, 2004	Palomar	NEAT	·	1.2 km	MPC · JPL
240546	2004 PY_{73}	—	August 8, 2004	Socorro	LINEAR	·	940 m	MPC · JPL
240547	2004 PJ_{91}	—	August 11, 2004	Socorro	LINEAR	·	1.2 km	MPC · JPL
240548	2004 QQ_{24}	—	August 22, 2004	Siding Spring	SSS	·	1.3 km	MPC · JPL
240549	2004 RC_{7}	—	September 5, 2004	Palomar	NEAT	BRG	2.2 km	MPC · JPL
240550	2004 RE_{7}	—	September 5, 2004	Palomar	NEAT	·	1.4 km	MPC · JPL
240551	2004 RD_{36}	—	September 7, 2004	Socorro	LINEAR	·	920 m	MPC · JPL
240552	2004 RQ_{60}	—	September 8, 2004	Socorro	LINEAR	·	1.7 km	MPC · JPL
240553	2004 RL_{105}	—	September 8, 2004	Palomar	NEAT	V	980 m	MPC · JPL
240554	2004 RK_{145}	—	September 9, 2004	Socorro	LINEAR	·	1.4 km	MPC · JPL
240555	2004 RZ_{151}	—	September 9, 2004	Socorro	LINEAR	·	1.1 km	MPC · JPL
240556	2004 RQ_{164}	—	September 8, 2004	Wrightwood	J. W. Young	·	1.8 km	MPC · JPL
240557	2004 RP_{227}	—	September 9, 2004	Kitt Peak	Spacewatch	·	1.3 km	MPC · JPL
240558	2004 RU_{250}	—	September 13, 2004	Palomar	NEAT	·	1.5 km	MPC · JPL
240559	2004 RD_{289}	—	September 15, 2004	Socorro	LINEAR	PHO	1.5 km	MPC · JPL
240560	2004 RM_{290}	—	September 8, 2004	Socorro	LINEAR	·	1.1 km	MPC · JPL
240561	2004 RC_{337}	—	September 15, 2004	Kitt Peak	Spacewatch	V	880 m	MPC · JPL
240562	2004 SK_{1}	—	September 16, 2004	Socorro	LINEAR	KON	3.3 km	MPC · JPL
240563	2004 SS_{1}	—	September 16, 2004	Kitt Peak	Spacewatch	NYS	1.4 km	MPC · JPL
240564	2004 SS_{2}	—	September 17, 2004	Socorro	LINEAR	·	2.1 km	MPC · JPL
240565	2004 SD_{5}	—	September 18, 2004	Siding Spring	SSS	PHO	1.5 km	MPC · JPL
240566	2004 SY_{31}	—	September 17, 2004	Socorro	LINEAR	·	1.0 km	MPC · JPL
240567	2004 SG_{54}	—	September 22, 2004	Socorro	LINEAR	·	1.1 km	MPC · JPL
240568	2004 SH_{61}	—	September 17, 2004	Socorro	LINEAR	·	980 m	MPC · JPL
240569	2004 TO_{4}	—	October 4, 2004	Kitt Peak	Spacewatch	·	1.2 km	MPC · JPL
240570	2004 TZ_{9}	—	October 7, 2004	Socorro	LINEAR	·	890 m	MPC · JPL
240571	2004 TW_{28}	—	October 4, 2004	Kitt Peak	Spacewatch	·	1.1 km	MPC · JPL
240572	2004 TG_{31}	—	October 4, 2004	Kitt Peak	Spacewatch	·	1.3 km	MPC · JPL
240573	2004 TM_{44}	—	October 4, 2004	Kitt Peak	Spacewatch	·	1.4 km	MPC · JPL
240574	2004 TT_{51}	—	October 4, 2004	Kitt Peak	Spacewatch	NYS	1.1 km	MPC · JPL
240575	2004 TC_{52}	—	October 4, 2004	Kitt Peak	Spacewatch	NYS	1.1 km	MPC · JPL
240576	2004 TN_{61}	—	October 5, 2004	Anderson Mesa	LONEOS	·	2.5 km	MPC · JPL
240577	2004 TW_{71}	—	October 6, 2004	Kitt Peak	Spacewatch	·	1.8 km	MPC · JPL
240578	2004 TC_{102}	—	October 6, 2004	Kitt Peak	Spacewatch	·	1.3 km	MPC · JPL
240579	2004 TJ_{102}	—	October 6, 2004	Kitt Peak	Spacewatch	·	1.0 km	MPC · JPL
240580	2004 TU_{113}	—	October 7, 2004	Palomar	NEAT	V	780 m	MPC · JPL
240581	2004 TH_{124}	—	October 7, 2004	Socorro	LINEAR	·	1.4 km	MPC · JPL
240582	2004 TX_{129}	—	October 7, 2004	Socorro	LINEAR	V	930 m	MPC · JPL
240583	2004 TK_{141}	—	October 4, 2004	Kitt Peak	Spacewatch	·	1.4 km	MPC · JPL
240584	2004 TB_{143}	—	October 4, 2004	Kitt Peak	Spacewatch	·	3.3 km	MPC · JPL
240585	2004 TD_{153}	—	October 6, 2004	Kitt Peak	Spacewatch	V	760 m	MPC · JPL
240586	2004 TH_{160}	—	October 6, 2004	Kitt Peak	Spacewatch	·	2.6 km	MPC · JPL
240587	2004 TN_{160}	—	October 6, 2004	Kitt Peak	Spacewatch	·	3.3 km	MPC · JPL
240588	2004 TZ_{168}	—	October 7, 2004	Socorro	LINEAR	NYS	1.5 km	MPC · JPL
240589	2004 TE_{176}	—	October 9, 2004	Socorro	LINEAR	·	1.2 km	MPC · JPL
240590	2004 TV_{215}	—	October 10, 2004	Kitt Peak	Spacewatch	·	910 m	MPC · JPL
240591	2004 TL_{250}	—	October 7, 2004	Palomar	NEAT	·	1.7 km	MPC · JPL
240592	2004 TD_{266}	—	October 9, 2004	Kitt Peak	Spacewatch	·	2.0 km	MPC · JPL
240593	2004 TJ_{278}	—	October 9, 2004	Kitt Peak	Spacewatch	·	1.7 km	MPC · JPL
240594	2004 TQ_{309}	—	October 10, 2004	Kitt Peak	Spacewatch	·	1.2 km	MPC · JPL
240595	2004 TQ_{349}	—	October 9, 2004	Socorro	LINEAR	·	1.4 km	MPC · JPL
240596	2004 UE_{5}	—	October 18, 2004	Socorro	LINEAR	·	2.9 km	MPC · JPL
240597	2004 VZ_{3}	—	November 3, 2004	Kitt Peak	Spacewatch	·	1.1 km	MPC · JPL
240598	2004 VP_{9}	—	November 3, 2004	Anderson Mesa	LONEOS	·	3.2 km	MPC · JPL
240599	2004 VN_{14}	—	November 4, 2004	Kitt Peak	Spacewatch	·	1.5 km	MPC · JPL
240600	2004 VB_{22}	—	November 4, 2004	Catalina	CSS	·	3.1 km	MPC · JPL

== 240601–240700 ==
back to top

Designation			Discovery			Properties		Ref
Permanent	Provisional	Named after	Date	Site	Discoverer(s)	Category	Diam.	Ref
240601	2004 VP_{22}	—	November 4, 2004	Catalina	CSS	NYS	1.2 km	MPC · JPL
240602	2004 VV_{31}	—	November 3, 2004	Kitt Peak	Spacewatch	V	900 m	MPC · JPL
240603	2004 VW_{46}	—	November 4, 2004	Kitt Peak	Spacewatch	·	1.1 km	MPC · JPL
240604	2004 VQ_{50}	—	November 4, 2004	Kitt Peak	Spacewatch	(5)	1.4 km	MPC · JPL
240605	2004 VX_{57}	—	November 7, 2004	Socorro	LINEAR	NYS	1.6 km	MPC · JPL
240606	2004 VZ_{76}	—	November 12, 2004	Catalina	CSS	·	1.7 km	MPC · JPL
240607	2004 VW_{91}	—	November 3, 2004	Palomar	NEAT	·	1.9 km	MPC · JPL
240608	2004 WN_{12}	—	November 19, 2004	Anderson Mesa	LONEOS	·	2.8 km	MPC · JPL
240609	2004 XZ_{6}	—	December 2, 2004	Socorro	LINEAR	·	1.5 km	MPC · JPL
240610	2004 XF_{7}	—	December 2, 2004	Socorro	LINEAR	·	3.6 km	MPC · JPL
240611	2004 XU_{23}	—	December 9, 2004	Socorro	LINEAR	·	3.3 km	MPC · JPL
240612	2004 XN_{25}	—	December 9, 2004	Catalina	CSS	·	1.9 km	MPC · JPL
240613	2004 XW_{33}	—	December 11, 2004	Campo Imperatore	CINEOS	·	1.9 km	MPC · JPL
240614	2004 XW_{41}	—	December 9, 2004	Catalina	CSS	·	1.3 km	MPC · JPL
240615	2004 XU_{49}	—	December 13, 2004	Junk Bond	Junk Bond	·	1.6 km	MPC · JPL
240616	2004 XH_{62}	—	December 14, 2004	Campo Imperatore	CINEOS	·	4.0 km	MPC · JPL
240617	2004 XV_{65}	—	December 2, 2004	Catalina	CSS	NYS	1.2 km	MPC · JPL
240618	2004 XR_{70}	—	December 11, 2004	Kitt Peak	Spacewatch	·	1.7 km	MPC · JPL
240619	2004 XY_{79}	—	December 10, 2004	Socorro	LINEAR	·	1.7 km	MPC · JPL
240620	2004 XS_{92}	—	December 11, 2004	Socorro	LINEAR	·	1.2 km	MPC · JPL
240621	2004 XH_{101}	—	December 14, 2004	Socorro	LINEAR	·	4.3 km	MPC · JPL
240622	2004 XU_{107}	—	December 11, 2004	Socorro	LINEAR	·	3.3 km	MPC · JPL
240623	2004 XY_{121}	—	December 15, 2004	Socorro	LINEAR	·	3.2 km	MPC · JPL
240624	2004 XF_{125}	—	December 11, 2004	Catalina	CSS	·	3.6 km	MPC · JPL
240625	2004 XJ_{130}	—	December 15, 2004	Socorro	LINEAR	·	2.0 km	MPC · JPL
240626	2004 XG_{133}	—	December 15, 2004	Kitt Peak	Spacewatch	·	1.7 km	MPC · JPL
240627	2004 XQ_{155}	—	December 12, 2004	Kitt Peak	Spacewatch	·	2.3 km	MPC · JPL
240628	2004 YN	—	December 17, 2004	Socorro	LINEAR	BAR	1.8 km	MPC · JPL
240629	2004 YS	—	December 16, 2004	Junk Bond	D. Healy	MIS	2.4 km	MPC · JPL
240630	2004 YU_{21}	—	December 18, 2004	Mount Lemmon	Mount Lemmon Survey	·	2.9 km	MPC · JPL
240631	2004 YE_{31}	—	December 18, 2004	Socorro	LINEAR	·	2.3 km	MPC · JPL
240632	2005 AZ_{18}	—	January 8, 2005	Needville	J. Dellinger	DOR	3.8 km	MPC · JPL
240633	2005 AY_{20}	—	January 6, 2005	Socorro	LINEAR	·	4.1 km	MPC · JPL
240634	2005 AK_{21}	—	January 6, 2005	Catalina	CSS	·	1.9 km	MPC · JPL
240635	2005 AS_{33}	—	January 13, 2005	Kitt Peak	Spacewatch	·	1.7 km	MPC · JPL
240636	2005 AG_{34}	—	January 13, 2005	Kitt Peak	Spacewatch	·	1.2 km	MPC · JPL
240637	2005 AN_{35}	—	January 13, 2005	Socorro	LINEAR	·	1.7 km	MPC · JPL
240638	2005 AF_{40}	—	January 15, 2005	Socorro	LINEAR	MIS	2.9 km	MPC · JPL
240639	2005 AX_{44}	—	January 15, 2005	Kitt Peak	Spacewatch	·	2.7 km	MPC · JPL
240640	2005 AM_{47}	—	January 13, 2005	Kitt Peak	Spacewatch	ADE	3.6 km	MPC · JPL
240641	2005 AR_{56}	—	January 15, 2005	Socorro	LINEAR	·	2.0 km	MPC · JPL
240642	2005 AZ_{57}	—	January 15, 2005	Catalina	CSS	·	3.2 km	MPC · JPL
240643	2005 BE_{8}	—	January 16, 2005	Socorro	LINEAR	·	1.8 km	MPC · JPL
240644	2005 BX_{16}	—	January 16, 2005	Socorro	LINEAR	·	1.4 km	MPC · JPL
240645	2005 BV_{22}	—	January 16, 2005	Kitt Peak	Spacewatch	EUN	2.0 km	MPC · JPL
240646	2005 BO_{26}	—	January 19, 2005	Socorro	LINEAR	·	1.8 km	MPC · JPL
240647	2005 BU_{26}	—	January 19, 2005	Kitt Peak	Spacewatch	EUN	1.9 km	MPC · JPL
240648	2005 BP_{49}	—	January 16, 2005	Catalina	CSS	·	3.1 km	MPC · JPL
240649	2005 CW	—	February 1, 2005	Catalina	CSS	EUN	2.2 km	MPC · JPL
240650	2005 CZ	—	February 1, 2005	Catalina	CSS	·	2.4 km	MPC · JPL
240651	2005 CZ_{13}	—	February 2, 2005	Kitt Peak	Spacewatch	·	2.4 km	MPC · JPL
240652	2005 CQ_{18}	—	February 2, 2005	Catalina	CSS	·	2.2 km	MPC · JPL
240653	2005 CJ_{23}	—	February 2, 2005	Socorro	LINEAR	·	1.9 km	MPC · JPL
240654	2005 CJ_{24}	—	February 3, 2005	Socorro	LINEAR	HNS	1.6 km	MPC · JPL
240655	2005 CB_{48}	—	February 2, 2005	Kitt Peak	Spacewatch	EOS	3.3 km	MPC · JPL
240656	2005 CG_{49}	—	February 2, 2005	Catalina	CSS	·	4.1 km	MPC · JPL
240657	2005 CT_{58}	—	February 2, 2005	Catalina	CSS	·	3.5 km	MPC · JPL
240658	2005 EX_{5}	—	March 1, 2005	Kitt Peak	Spacewatch	·	2.5 km	MPC · JPL
240659	2005 ET_{22}	—	March 3, 2005	Catalina	CSS	·	2.2 km	MPC · JPL
240660	2005 EX_{23}	—	March 3, 2005	Catalina	CSS	(13314)	2.9 km	MPC · JPL
240661	2005 EA_{29}	—	March 3, 2005	Catalina	CSS	·	2.3 km	MPC · JPL
240662	2005 EZ_{30}	—	March 1, 2005	Goodricke-Pigott	R. A. Tucker	·	2.7 km	MPC · JPL
240663	2005 EQ_{46}	—	March 3, 2005	Catalina	CSS	ADE	2.6 km	MPC · JPL
240664	2005 EJ_{49}	—	March 3, 2005	Catalina	CSS	·	4.9 km	MPC · JPL
240665	2005 EH_{51}	—	March 3, 2005	Catalina	CSS	·	2.4 km	MPC · JPL
240666	2005 EN_{68}	—	March 7, 2005	Socorro	LINEAR	DOR	2.4 km	MPC · JPL
240667	2005 EA_{75}	—	March 3, 2005	Kitt Peak	Spacewatch	·	2.0 km	MPC · JPL
240668	2005 EB_{75}	—	March 3, 2005	Kitt Peak	Spacewatch	·	3.3 km	MPC · JPL
240669	2005 EQ_{83}	—	March 4, 2005	Kitt Peak	Spacewatch	·	3.1 km	MPC · JPL
240670	2005 EK_{88}	—	March 8, 2005	Anderson Mesa	LONEOS	·	2.5 km	MPC · JPL
240671	2005 EO_{88}	—	March 8, 2005	Kitt Peak	Spacewatch	·	2.0 km	MPC · JPL
240672	2005 EJ_{93}	—	March 8, 2005	Socorro	LINEAR	·	2.7 km	MPC · JPL
240673	2005 EB_{95}	—	March 3, 2005	Catalina	CSS	·	2.4 km	MPC · JPL
240674	2005 ET_{96}	—	March 3, 2005	Catalina	CSS	·	3.1 km	MPC · JPL
240675	2005 EX_{119}	—	March 8, 2005	Goodricke-Pigott	R. A. Tucker	JUN	1.4 km	MPC · JPL
240676	2005 EJ_{120}	—	March 8, 2005	Goodricke-Pigott	R. A. Tucker	HNS	1.7 km	MPC · JPL
240677	2005 ES_{124}	—	March 8, 2005	Socorro	LINEAR	·	3.0 km	MPC · JPL
240678	2005 EU_{125}	—	March 8, 2005	Catalina	CSS	·	4.0 km	MPC · JPL
240679	2005 EJ_{126}	—	March 8, 2005	Socorro	LINEAR	·	3.2 km	MPC · JPL
240680	2005 EM_{131}	—	March 9, 2005	Mount Lemmon	Mount Lemmon Survey	·	2.0 km	MPC · JPL
240681	2005 EZ_{132}	—	March 9, 2005	Catalina	CSS	GEF	1.9 km	MPC · JPL
240682	2005 EK_{138}	—	March 9, 2005	Socorro	LINEAR	EOS	3.0 km	MPC · JPL
240683	2005 EX_{148}	—	March 10, 2005	Kitt Peak	Spacewatch	VER	4.4 km	MPC · JPL
240684	2005 EZ_{149}	—	March 10, 2005	Kitt Peak	Spacewatch	AGN	1.5 km	MPC · JPL
240685	2005 EH_{170}	—	March 3, 2005	Kitt Peak	Spacewatch	·	2.1 km	MPC · JPL
240686	2005 EW_{188}	—	March 10, 2005	Mount Lemmon	Mount Lemmon Survey	EOS	2.3 km	MPC · JPL
240687	2005 EU_{195}	—	March 11, 2005	Mount Lemmon	Mount Lemmon Survey	KOR	1.4 km	MPC · JPL
240688	2005 EO_{208}	—	March 4, 2005	Kitt Peak	Spacewatch	·	2.3 km	MPC · JPL
240689	2005 EQ_{219}	—	March 10, 2005	Mount Lemmon	Mount Lemmon Survey	·	3.1 km	MPC · JPL
240690	2005 EV_{222}	—	March 8, 2005	Socorro	LINEAR	·	3.4 km	MPC · JPL
240691	2005 EL_{234}	—	March 10, 2005	Mount Lemmon	Mount Lemmon Survey	·	2.4 km	MPC · JPL
240692	2005 EC_{243}	—	March 11, 2005	Kitt Peak	Spacewatch	KOR	1.8 km	MPC · JPL
240693	2005 EA_{292}	—	March 10, 2005	Catalina	CSS	·	3.1 km	MPC · JPL
240694	2005 EL_{318}	—	March 9, 2005	Catalina	CSS	·	5.2 km	MPC · JPL
240695	2005 EQ_{327}	—	March 4, 2005	Catalina	CSS	·	4.0 km	MPC · JPL
240696	2005 FA_{3}	—	March 17, 2005	Catalina	CSS	·	7.0 km	MPC · JPL
240697 Gemenc	2005 GC	Gemenc	April 1, 2005	Piszkéstető	K. Sárneczky	·	3.3 km	MPC · JPL
240698	2005 GQ_{7}	—	April 1, 2005	Anderson Mesa	LONEOS	·	2.1 km	MPC · JPL
240699	2005 GQ_{17}	—	April 2, 2005	Mount Lemmon	Mount Lemmon Survey	·	1.9 km	MPC · JPL
240700	2005 GK_{28}	—	April 4, 2005	Kitt Peak	Spacewatch	(194)	2.2 km	MPC · JPL

== 240701–240800 ==
back to top

Designation			Discovery			Properties		Ref
Permanent	Provisional	Named after	Date	Site	Discoverer(s)	Category	Diam.	Ref
240701	2005 GT_{30}	—	April 4, 2005	Mount Lemmon	Mount Lemmon Survey	·	2.4 km	MPC · JPL
240702	2005 GN_{31}	—	April 4, 2005	Catalina	CSS	·	3.1 km	MPC · JPL
240703	2005 GR_{48}	—	April 5, 2005	Mount Lemmon	Mount Lemmon Survey	KOR	1.8 km	MPC · JPL
240704	2005 GY_{54}	—	April 5, 2005	Mount Lemmon	Mount Lemmon Survey	KOR	1.4 km	MPC · JPL
240705	2005 GZ_{60}	—	April 8, 2005	Great Shefford	Birtwhistle, P.	·	5.6 km	MPC · JPL
240706	2005 GH_{61}	—	April 2, 2005	Kitt Peak	Spacewatch	AGN	1.5 km	MPC · JPL
240707	2005 GO_{78}	—	April 6, 2005	Catalina	CSS	·	2.6 km	MPC · JPL
240708	2005 GP_{78}	—	April 6, 2005	Catalina	CSS	MAR	2.2 km	MPC · JPL
240709	2005 GS_{78}	—	April 6, 2005	Catalina	CSS	·	4.5 km	MPC · JPL
240710	2005 GZ_{89}	—	April 5, 2005	Kitt Peak	Spacewatch	·	1.9 km	MPC · JPL
240711	2005 GZ_{103}	—	April 9, 2005	Catalina	CSS	·	5.3 km	MPC · JPL
240712	2005 GM_{108}	—	April 10, 2005	Mount Lemmon	Mount Lemmon Survey	KOR	1.5 km	MPC · JPL
240713	2005 GK_{110}	—	April 10, 2005	Mount Lemmon	Mount Lemmon Survey	KOR	2.0 km	MPC · JPL
240714	2005 GO_{111}	—	April 5, 2005	Mount Lemmon	Mount Lemmon Survey	HYG	4.0 km	MPC · JPL
240715	2005 GK_{113}	—	April 9, 2005	Mount Lemmon	Mount Lemmon Survey	HOF	3.9 km	MPC · JPL
240716	2005 GF_{116}	—	April 11, 2005	Kitt Peak	Spacewatch	·	3.6 km	MPC · JPL
240717	2005 GT_{118}	—	April 11, 2005	Mount Lemmon	Mount Lemmon Survey	·	2.9 km	MPC · JPL
240718	2005 GU_{125}	—	April 10, 2005	Mount Lemmon	Mount Lemmon Survey	·	3.1 km	MPC · JPL
240719	2005 GE_{130}	—	April 7, 2005	Kitt Peak	Spacewatch	·	2.8 km	MPC · JPL
240720	2005 GZ_{132}	—	April 10, 2005	Kitt Peak	Spacewatch	·	2.5 km	MPC · JPL
240721	2005 GW_{149}	—	April 11, 2005	Kitt Peak	Spacewatch	·	2.0 km	MPC · JPL
240722	2005 GS_{160}	—	April 12, 2005	Socorro	LINEAR	·	4.9 km	MPC · JPL
240723	2005 GA_{172}	—	April 13, 2005	Socorro	LINEAR	HYG	3.3 km	MPC · JPL
240724	2005 GG_{172}	—	April 14, 2005	Kitt Peak	Spacewatch	AGN	1.7 km	MPC · JPL
240725 Scipioni	2005 GX_{190}	Scipioni	April 12, 2005	Kitt Peak	M. W. Buie	·	3.1 km	MPC · JPL
240726	2005 GX_{201}	—	April 4, 2005	Mount Lemmon	Mount Lemmon Survey	·	4.4 km	MPC · JPL
240727	2005 GD_{213}	—	April 1, 2005	Kitt Peak	Spacewatch	·	2.7 km	MPC · JPL
240728	2005 GQ_{214}	—	April 2, 2005	Kitt Peak	Spacewatch	·	3.5 km	MPC · JPL
240729	2005 GP_{222}	—	April 10, 2005	Kitt Peak	Spacewatch	·	3.4 km	MPC · JPL
240730	2005 JK	—	May 1, 2005	Siding Spring	SSS	·	4.5 km	MPC · JPL
240731	2005 JU_{25}	—	May 3, 2005	Catalina	CSS	H	590 m	MPC · JPL
240732	2005 JK_{28}	—	May 3, 2005	Kitt Peak	Spacewatch	EOS ·	3.7 km	MPC · JPL
240733	2005 JS_{35}	—	May 4, 2005	Kitt Peak	Spacewatch	·	3.9 km	MPC · JPL
240734	2005 JQ_{44}	—	May 8, 2005	Mount Lemmon	Mount Lemmon Survey	·	1.9 km	MPC · JPL
240735	2005 JU_{58}	—	May 8, 2005	Kitt Peak	Spacewatch	·	2.8 km	MPC · JPL
240736	2005 JK_{59}	—	May 8, 2005	Anderson Mesa	LONEOS	·	3.2 km	MPC · JPL
240737	2005 JN_{76}	—	May 9, 2005	Mount Lemmon	Mount Lemmon Survey	EOS	2.1 km	MPC · JPL
240738	2005 JQ_{86}	—	May 8, 2005	Kitt Peak	Spacewatch	H · slow	690 m	MPC · JPL
240739	2005 JD_{88}	—	May 10, 2005	Kitt Peak	Spacewatch	LUT	5.6 km	MPC · JPL
240740	2005 JZ_{89}	—	May 11, 2005	Cordell-Lorenz	D. T. Durig	EOS	3.2 km	MPC · JPL
240741	2005 JK_{90}	—	May 11, 2005	Mount Lemmon	Mount Lemmon Survey	·	2.8 km	MPC · JPL
240742	2005 JL_{90}	—	May 11, 2005	Mount Lemmon	Mount Lemmon Survey	KOR	2.1 km	MPC · JPL
240743	2005 JG_{96}	—	May 8, 2005	Mount Lemmon	Mount Lemmon Survey	·	2.0 km	MPC · JPL
240744	2005 JL_{103}	—	May 9, 2005	Kitt Peak	Spacewatch	·	3.8 km	MPC · JPL
240745	2005 JQ_{106}	—	May 12, 2005	Kitt Peak	Spacewatch	·	2.2 km	MPC · JPL
240746	2005 JH_{114}	—	May 10, 2005	Kitt Peak	Spacewatch	·	2.1 km	MPC · JPL
240747	2005 JT_{119}	—	May 10, 2005	Kitt Peak	Spacewatch	HYG	3.4 km	MPC · JPL
240748	2005 JN_{127}	—	May 12, 2005	Socorro	LINEAR	·	4.3 km	MPC · JPL
240749	2005 JF_{131}	—	May 13, 2005	Kitt Peak	Spacewatch	·	3.2 km	MPC · JPL
240750	2005 JG_{131}	—	May 13, 2005	Kitt Peak	Spacewatch	·	3.0 km	MPC · JPL
240751	2005 JA_{134}	—	May 14, 2005	Kitt Peak	Spacewatch	·	2.7 km	MPC · JPL
240752	2005 JG_{152}	—	May 4, 2005	Mount Lemmon	Mount Lemmon Survey	·	3.2 km	MPC · JPL
240753	2005 JG_{161}	—	May 8, 2005	Kitt Peak	Spacewatch	·	3.8 km	MPC · JPL
240754	2005 JZ_{163}	—	May 9, 2005	Catalina	CSS	·	6.0 km	MPC · JPL
240755	2005 JD_{178}	—	May 10, 2005	Mount Lemmon	Mount Lemmon Survey	EOS	2.6 km	MPC · JPL
240756	2005 KU	—	May 16, 2005	Socorro	LINEAR	·	3.0 km	MPC · JPL
240757 Farkasberci	2005 KS_{8}	Farkasberci	May 26, 2005	Piszkéstető	K. Sárneczky	·	2.5 km	MPC · JPL
240758	2005 LA_{2}	—	June 1, 2005	Kitt Peak	Spacewatch	·	2.7 km	MPC · JPL
240759	2005 LJ_{12}	—	June 5, 2005	Kitt Peak	Spacewatch	·	5.6 km	MPC · JPL
240760	2005 LF_{19}	—	June 8, 2005	Kitt Peak	Spacewatch	TEL	1.8 km	MPC · JPL
240761	2005 LR_{20}	—	June 4, 2005	Kitt Peak	Spacewatch	·	2.6 km	MPC · JPL
240762	2005 LU_{36}	—	June 13, 2005	Kitt Peak	Spacewatch	·	5.6 km	MPC · JPL
240763	2005 LL_{38}	—	June 11, 2005	Kitt Peak	Spacewatch	CYB	5.5 km	MPC · JPL
240764	2005 LL_{46}	—	June 13, 2005	Mount Lemmon	Mount Lemmon Survey	HYG	3.6 km	MPC · JPL
240765	2005 MX_{12}	—	June 29, 2005	Catalina	CSS	·	5.2 km	MPC · JPL
240766	2005 NK_{87}	—	July 3, 2005	Siding Spring	SSS	·	4.2 km	MPC · JPL
240767	2005 NO_{87}	—	July 4, 2005	Kitt Peak	Spacewatch	THM	3.1 km	MPC · JPL
240768	2005 OJ_{1}	—	July 17, 2005	Siding Spring	SSS	THB	6.4 km	MPC · JPL
240769	2005 OW_{26}	—	July 27, 2005	Siding Spring	SSS	·	3.4 km	MPC · JPL
240770	2005 OW_{27}	—	July 29, 2005	Socorro	LINEAR	H	750 m	MPC · JPL
240771	2005 PY_{17}	—	August 12, 2005	Pla D'Arguines	R. Ferrando, Ferrando, M.	HYG	4.3 km	MPC · JPL
240772	2005 QT_{146}	—	August 28, 2005	Siding Spring	SSS	·	5.1 km	MPC · JPL
240773	2005 QA_{183}	—	August 29, 2005	Kitt Peak	Spacewatch	·	3.7 km	MPC · JPL
240774	2005 RM_{45}	—	September 14, 2005	Catalina	CSS	LIX	5.1 km	MPC · JPL
240775	2005 SM_{36}	—	September 24, 2005	Kitt Peak	Spacewatch	THM	3.6 km	MPC · JPL
240776	2005 SW_{82}	—	September 24, 2005	Kitt Peak	Spacewatch	·	3.0 km	MPC · JPL
240777	2005 SJ_{95}	—	September 25, 2005	Kitt Peak	Spacewatch	·	3.4 km	MPC · JPL
240778	2005 SJ_{104}	—	September 25, 2005	Kitt Peak	Spacewatch	·	3.9 km	MPC · JPL
240779	2005 SM_{187}	—	September 29, 2005	Anderson Mesa	LONEOS	·	2.4 km	MPC · JPL
240780	2005 SA_{221}	—	September 29, 2005	Catalina	CSS	TIR	3.3 km	MPC · JPL
240781	2005 SZ_{264}	—	September 26, 2005	Kitt Peak	Spacewatch	·	5.9 km	MPC · JPL
240782	2005 SQ_{277}	—	September 30, 2005	Mount Lemmon	Mount Lemmon Survey	·	1.1 km	MPC · JPL
240783	2005 TP_{101}	—	October 7, 2005	Catalina	CSS	·	5.5 km	MPC · JPL
240784	2005 TG_{153}	—	October 7, 2005	Socorro	LINEAR	LIX	5.2 km	MPC · JPL
240785	2005 TO_{188}	—	October 10, 2005	Catalina	CSS	·	4.8 km	MPC · JPL
240786	2005 UV_{36}	—	October 24, 2005	Kitt Peak	Spacewatch	·	810 m	MPC · JPL
240787	2005 UY_{64}	—	October 20, 2005	Mount Lemmon	Mount Lemmon Survey	·	5.7 km	MPC · JPL
240788	2005 UK_{112}	—	October 22, 2005	Kitt Peak	Spacewatch	·	960 m	MPC · JPL
240789	2005 UM_{156}	—	October 28, 2005	Junk Bond	D. Healy	·	6.2 km	MPC · JPL
240790	2005 UH_{505}	—	October 24, 2005	Mauna Kea	D. J. Tholen	NYS	1.4 km	MPC · JPL
240791	2005 VN_{54}	—	November 4, 2005	Kitt Peak	Spacewatch	·	1.3 km	MPC · JPL
240792	2005 VO_{65}	—	November 1, 2005	Mount Lemmon	Mount Lemmon Survey	·	1.3 km	MPC · JPL
240793	2005 VC_{107}	—	November 5, 2005	Kitt Peak	Spacewatch	·	1.6 km	MPC · JPL
240794	2005 WG_{87}	—	November 28, 2005	Mount Lemmon	Mount Lemmon Survey	·	2.0 km	MPC · JPL
240795	2005 WP_{89}	—	November 26, 2005	Kitt Peak	Spacewatch	NYS	1.4 km	MPC · JPL
240796	2005 WL_{160}	—	November 28, 2005	Kitt Peak	Spacewatch	V	930 m	MPC · JPL
240797	2005 XE_{32}	—	December 4, 2005	Kitt Peak	Spacewatch	·	2.0 km	MPC · JPL
240798	2005 XF_{37}	—	December 4, 2005	Kitt Peak	Spacewatch	·	1.1 km	MPC · JPL
240799	2005 XF_{82}	—	December 8, 2005	Kitt Peak	Spacewatch	·	940 m	MPC · JPL
240800	2005 YY_{12}	—	December 22, 2005	Kitt Peak	Spacewatch	·	1.0 km	MPC · JPL

== 240801–240900 ==
back to top

Designation			Discovery			Properties		Ref
Permanent	Provisional	Named after	Date	Site	Discoverer(s)	Category	Diam.	Ref
240801	2005 YN_{62}	—	December 24, 2005	Kitt Peak	Spacewatch	·	710 m	MPC · JPL
240802	2005 YT_{70}	—	December 27, 2005	Mount Lemmon	Mount Lemmon Survey	·	1.7 km	MPC · JPL
240803	2005 YJ_{90}	—	December 26, 2005	Mount Lemmon	Mount Lemmon Survey	SUL	3.3 km	MPC · JPL
240804	2005 YX_{105}	—	December 25, 2005	Kitt Peak	Spacewatch	·	1.2 km	MPC · JPL
240805	2005 YL_{143}	—	December 28, 2005	Mount Lemmon	Mount Lemmon Survey	·	1.0 km	MPC · JPL
240806	2005 YE_{198}	—	December 25, 2005	Kitt Peak	Spacewatch	NYS	1.7 km	MPC · JPL
240807	2005 YF_{204}	—	December 25, 2005	Mount Lemmon	Mount Lemmon Survey	·	900 m	MPC · JPL
240808	2005 YV_{204}	—	December 25, 2005	Mount Lemmon	Mount Lemmon Survey	·	1.3 km	MPC · JPL
240809	2005 YT_{207}	—	December 30, 2005	Kitt Peak	Spacewatch	·	870 m	MPC · JPL
240810	2005 YW_{230}	—	December 26, 2005	Mount Lemmon	Mount Lemmon Survey	·	1.7 km	MPC · JPL
240811	2005 YG_{269}	—	December 25, 2005	Mount Lemmon	Mount Lemmon Survey	·	1.1 km	MPC · JPL
240812	2005 YB_{271}	—	December 28, 2005	Mount Lemmon	Mount Lemmon Survey	·	960 m	MPC · JPL
240813	2006 AT_{11}	—	January 3, 2006	Socorro	LINEAR	·	1.5 km	MPC · JPL
240814	2006 AC_{13}	—	January 5, 2006	Kitt Peak	Spacewatch	·	2.7 km	MPC · JPL
240815	2006 AL_{15}	—	January 5, 2006	Mount Lemmon	Mount Lemmon Survey	·	900 m	MPC · JPL
240816	2006 AN_{16}	—	January 4, 2006	Mount Lemmon	Mount Lemmon Survey	·	2.2 km	MPC · JPL
240817	2006 AC_{19}	—	January 5, 2006	Kitt Peak	Spacewatch	·	940 m	MPC · JPL
240818	2006 AW_{19}	—	January 5, 2006	Catalina	CSS	·	770 m	MPC · JPL
240819	2006 AE_{61}	—	January 5, 2006	Kitt Peak	Spacewatch	·	790 m	MPC · JPL
240820	2006 AY_{67}	—	January 5, 2006	Mount Lemmon	Mount Lemmon Survey	·	1.0 km	MPC · JPL
240821	2006 AA_{69}	—	January 6, 2006	Kitt Peak	Spacewatch	·	820 m	MPC · JPL
240822	2006 AU_{76}	—	January 5, 2006	Anderson Mesa	LONEOS	NYS	1.0 km	MPC · JPL
240823	2006 AY_{77}	—	January 7, 2006	Mount Lemmon	Mount Lemmon Survey	·	1.5 km	MPC · JPL
240824	2006 AH_{100}	—	January 6, 2006	Mount Lemmon	Mount Lemmon Survey	NYS	1.7 km	MPC · JPL
240825	2006 BZ_{16}	—	January 22, 2006	Anderson Mesa	LONEOS	·	1.3 km	MPC · JPL
240826	2006 BW_{19}	—	January 22, 2006	Anderson Mesa	LONEOS	·	1.4 km	MPC · JPL
240827	2006 BT_{21}	—	January 22, 2006	Mount Lemmon	Mount Lemmon Survey	·	1.1 km	MPC · JPL
240828	2006 BT_{22}	—	January 22, 2006	Mount Lemmon	Mount Lemmon Survey	·	1.0 km	MPC · JPL
240829	2006 BG_{24}	—	January 23, 2006	Mount Lemmon	Mount Lemmon Survey	·	1.8 km	MPC · JPL
240830	2006 BD_{26}	—	January 22, 2006	Anderson Mesa	LONEOS	·	1.9 km	MPC · JPL
240831	2006 BL_{38}	—	January 23, 2006	Kitt Peak	Spacewatch	·	1.6 km	MPC · JPL
240832	2006 BP_{38}	—	January 23, 2006	Mount Lemmon	Mount Lemmon Survey	V	760 m	MPC · JPL
240833	2006 BH_{45}	—	January 23, 2006	Mount Lemmon	Mount Lemmon Survey	MAS	860 m	MPC · JPL
240834	2006 BT_{57}	—	January 23, 2006	Kitt Peak	Spacewatch	·	1.2 km	MPC · JPL
240835	2006 BG_{74}	—	January 23, 2006	Kitt Peak	Spacewatch	NYS	1.3 km	MPC · JPL
240836	2006 BF_{79}	—	January 23, 2006	Kitt Peak	Spacewatch	·	1.5 km	MPC · JPL
240837	2006 BH_{79}	—	January 23, 2006	Kitt Peak	Spacewatch	·	1.6 km	MPC · JPL
240838	2006 BQ_{79}	—	January 23, 2006	Kitt Peak	Spacewatch	·	1.9 km	MPC · JPL
240839	2006 BU_{80}	—	January 23, 2006	Kitt Peak	Spacewatch	·	1.5 km	MPC · JPL
240840	2006 BT_{85}	—	January 25, 2006	Catalina	CSS	MAS	850 m	MPC · JPL
240841	2006 BW_{92}	—	January 26, 2006	Kitt Peak	Spacewatch	MAS	870 m	MPC · JPL
240842	2006 BP_{95}	—	January 26, 2006	Kitt Peak	Spacewatch	MAS	890 m	MPC · JPL
240843	2006 BJ_{125}	—	January 26, 2006	Kitt Peak	Spacewatch	MAS	960 m	MPC · JPL
240844	2006 BR_{125}	—	January 26, 2006	Kitt Peak	Spacewatch	·	1.3 km	MPC · JPL
240845	2006 BA_{126}	—	January 26, 2006	Kitt Peak	Spacewatch	MAS	650 m	MPC · JPL
240846	2006 BE_{131}	—	January 26, 2006	Kitt Peak	Spacewatch	·	1.1 km	MPC · JPL
240847	2006 BV_{136}	—	January 28, 2006	Mount Lemmon	Mount Lemmon Survey	·	1.8 km	MPC · JPL
240848	2006 BU_{139}	—	January 29, 2006	Kitt Peak	Spacewatch	MAS	930 m	MPC · JPL
240849	2006 BT_{147}	—	January 31, 2006	7300	W. K. Y. Yeung	NYS	1.1 km	MPC · JPL
240850	2006 BW_{151}	—	January 25, 2006	Kitt Peak	Spacewatch	·	980 m	MPC · JPL
240851	2006 BR_{153}	—	January 25, 2006	Kitt Peak	Spacewatch	NYS	1.8 km	MPC · JPL
240852	2006 BL_{154}	—	January 25, 2006	Kitt Peak	Spacewatch	NYS	1.0 km	MPC · JPL
240853	2006 BQ_{156}	—	January 25, 2006	Kitt Peak	Spacewatch	V	790 m	MPC · JPL
240854	2006 BB_{169}	—	January 26, 2006	Mount Lemmon	Mount Lemmon Survey	·	1.1 km	MPC · JPL
240855	2006 BS_{184}	—	January 28, 2006	Mount Lemmon	Mount Lemmon Survey	(2076)	880 m	MPC · JPL
240856	2006 BA_{189}	—	January 28, 2006	Kitt Peak	Spacewatch	·	1.3 km	MPC · JPL
240857	2006 BM_{195}	—	January 30, 2006	Kitt Peak	Spacewatch	·	1.8 km	MPC · JPL
240858	2006 BC_{200}	—	January 30, 2006	Kitt Peak	Spacewatch	·	1.3 km	MPC · JPL
240859	2006 BM_{211}	—	January 31, 2006	Kitt Peak	Spacewatch	·	1.0 km	MPC · JPL
240860	2006 BE_{217}	—	January 27, 2006	Anderson Mesa	LONEOS	·	1.4 km	MPC · JPL
240861	2006 BN_{227}	—	January 30, 2006	Kitt Peak	Spacewatch	MAS	1.0 km	MPC · JPL
240862	2006 BW_{268}	—	January 27, 2006	Catalina	CSS	·	1.8 km	MPC · JPL
240863	2006 CN_{1}	—	February 1, 2006	Vail-Jarnac	Jarnac	·	1.6 km	MPC · JPL
240864	2006 CV_{4}	—	February 1, 2006	Kitt Peak	Spacewatch	·	1.5 km	MPC · JPL
240865	2006 CR_{17}	—	February 1, 2006	Kitt Peak	Spacewatch	MAS	900 m	MPC · JPL
240866	2006 CT_{21}	—	February 1, 2006	Kitt Peak	Spacewatch	V	990 m	MPC · JPL
240867	2006 CZ_{39}	—	February 2, 2006	Mount Lemmon	Mount Lemmon Survey	·	1.4 km	MPC · JPL
240868	2006 CK_{46}	—	February 3, 2006	Kitt Peak	Spacewatch	·	910 m	MPC · JPL
240869	2006 CD_{49}	—	February 3, 2006	Kitt Peak	Spacewatch	·	1.4 km	MPC · JPL
240870	2006 CY_{61}	—	February 3, 2006	Mount Lemmon	Mount Lemmon Survey	MAS	860 m	MPC · JPL
240871 MOSS	2006 DA	MOSS	February 19, 2006	Vicques	M. Ory	·	2.2 km	MPC · JPL
240872	2006 DR_{3}	—	February 20, 2006	Catalina	CSS	·	2.0 km	MPC · JPL
240873	2006 DU_{3}	—	February 20, 2006	Catalina	CSS	·	950 m	MPC · JPL
240874	2006 DG_{7}	—	February 20, 2006	Mount Lemmon	Mount Lemmon Survey	·	1.9 km	MPC · JPL
240875	2006 DW_{13}	—	February 22, 2006	Socorro	LINEAR	NYS	1.9 km	MPC · JPL
240876	2006 DV_{23}	—	February 20, 2006	Kitt Peak	Spacewatch	·	1.0 km	MPC · JPL
240877	2006 DU_{27}	—	February 20, 2006	Kitt Peak	Spacewatch	NYS	1.3 km	MPC · JPL
240878	2006 DN_{29}	—	February 20, 2006	Mount Lemmon	Mount Lemmon Survey	(2076)	1.7 km	MPC · JPL
240879	2006 DD_{30}	—	February 20, 2006	Kitt Peak	Spacewatch	·	1.3 km	MPC · JPL
240880	2006 DR_{34}	—	February 20, 2006	Kitt Peak	Spacewatch	·	1.4 km	MPC · JPL
240881	2006 DG_{40}	—	February 22, 2006	Catalina	CSS	·	1.5 km	MPC · JPL
240882	2006 DR_{46}	—	February 20, 2006	Mount Lemmon	Mount Lemmon Survey	·	1.6 km	MPC · JPL
240883	2006 DK_{49}	—	February 21, 2006	Catalina	CSS	MAS	980 m	MPC · JPL
240884	2006 DM_{52}	—	February 24, 2006	Kitt Peak	Spacewatch	·	1.7 km	MPC · JPL
240885	2006 DT_{60}	—	February 24, 2006	Kitt Peak	Spacewatch	·	1.7 km	MPC · JPL
240886	2006 DJ_{61}	—	February 24, 2006	Kitt Peak	Spacewatch	·	1.4 km	MPC · JPL
240887	2006 DA_{63}	—	February 23, 2006	Anderson Mesa	LONEOS	·	2.8 km	MPC · JPL
240888	2006 DK_{63}	—	February 24, 2006	Pla D'Arguines	D'Arguines, Pla	V	710 m	MPC · JPL
240889	2006 DK_{64}	—	February 20, 2006	Socorro	LINEAR	·	1.9 km	MPC · JPL
240890	2006 DP_{69}	—	February 20, 2006	Kitt Peak	Spacewatch	·	1.2 km	MPC · JPL
240891	2006 DT_{69}	—	February 20, 2006	Mount Lemmon	Mount Lemmon Survey	·	1.1 km	MPC · JPL
240892	2006 DV_{69}	—	February 20, 2006	Mount Lemmon	Mount Lemmon Survey	·	2.9 km	MPC · JPL
240893	2006 DT_{71}	—	February 21, 2006	Mount Lemmon	Mount Lemmon Survey	·	1.3 km	MPC · JPL
240894	2006 DE_{74}	—	February 23, 2006	Anderson Mesa	LONEOS	V	1.1 km	MPC · JPL
240895	2006 DV_{76}	—	February 24, 2006	Kitt Peak	Spacewatch	·	1.8 km	MPC · JPL
240896	2006 DW_{87}	—	February 24, 2006	Kitt Peak	Spacewatch	·	2.4 km	MPC · JPL
240897	2006 DY_{90}	—	February 24, 2006	Kitt Peak	Spacewatch	MAS	900 m	MPC · JPL
240898	2006 DR_{97}	—	February 24, 2006	Kitt Peak	Spacewatch	NYS	1.3 km	MPC · JPL
240899	2006 DV_{97}	—	February 24, 2006	Mount Lemmon	Mount Lemmon Survey	BAR	1.7 km	MPC · JPL
240900	2006 DB_{98}	—	February 24, 2006	Kitt Peak	Spacewatch	·	1.9 km	MPC · JPL

== 240901–241000 ==
back to top

Designation			Discovery			Properties		Ref
Permanent	Provisional	Named after	Date	Site	Discoverer(s)	Category	Diam.	Ref
240901	2006 DM_{101}	—	February 25, 2006	Kitt Peak	Spacewatch	·	1.6 km	MPC · JPL
240902	2006 DW_{105}	—	February 25, 2006	Mount Lemmon	Mount Lemmon Survey	·	1.3 km	MPC · JPL
240903	2006 DK_{115}	—	February 27, 2006	Kitt Peak	Spacewatch	MAS	1.1 km	MPC · JPL
240904	2006 DV_{131}	—	February 25, 2006	Kitt Peak	Spacewatch	·	990 m	MPC · JPL
240905	2006 DH_{147}	—	February 25, 2006	Kitt Peak	Spacewatch	NYS	1.3 km	MPC · JPL
240906	2006 DQ_{147}	—	February 25, 2006	Kitt Peak	Spacewatch	·	1.5 km	MPC · JPL
240907	2006 DT_{150}	—	February 25, 2006	Kitt Peak	Spacewatch	ERI	2.2 km	MPC · JPL
240908	2006 DU_{150}	—	February 25, 2006	Kitt Peak	Spacewatch	·	1.3 km	MPC · JPL
240909	2006 DO_{156}	—	February 27, 2006	Kitt Peak	Spacewatch	·	2.8 km	MPC · JPL
240910	2006 DR_{170}	—	February 27, 2006	Kitt Peak	Spacewatch	·	1.5 km	MPC · JPL
240911	2006 DO_{183}	—	February 27, 2006	Kitt Peak	Spacewatch	NYS	1.8 km	MPC · JPL
240912	2006 DU_{190}	—	February 27, 2006	Kitt Peak	Spacewatch	NYS	1.7 km	MPC · JPL
240913	2006 DC_{192}	—	February 27, 2006	Kitt Peak	Spacewatch	·	2.8 km	MPC · JPL
240914	2006 DQ_{196}	—	February 24, 2006	Kitt Peak	Spacewatch	L5	14 km	MPC · JPL
240915	2006 DG_{211}	—	February 24, 2006	Kitt Peak	Spacewatch	NYS	1.2 km	MPC · JPL
240916	2006 DH_{215}	—	February 24, 2006	Kitt Peak	Spacewatch	·	2.0 km	MPC · JPL
240917	2006 EU	—	March 4, 2006	Goodricke-Pigott	R. A. Tucker	·	1.8 km	MPC · JPL
240918	2006 EO_{15}	—	March 2, 2006	Kitt Peak	Spacewatch	MAS	750 m	MPC · JPL
240919	2006 EV_{42}	—	March 4, 2006	Kitt Peak	Spacewatch	·	2.3 km	MPC · JPL
240920	2006 EJ_{63}	—	March 5, 2006	Kitt Peak	Spacewatch	·	1.7 km	MPC · JPL
240921	2006 EF_{67}	—	March 8, 2006	Kitt Peak	Spacewatch	V	860 m	MPC · JPL
240922	2006 FS_{3}	—	March 23, 2006	Kitt Peak	Spacewatch	·	2.5 km	MPC · JPL
240923	2006 FN_{4}	—	March 23, 2006	Kitt Peak	Spacewatch	·	1.5 km	MPC · JPL
240924	2006 FY_{4}	—	March 23, 2006	Mount Lemmon	Mount Lemmon Survey	·	1.4 km	MPC · JPL
240925	2006 FP_{5}	—	March 23, 2006	Mount Lemmon	Mount Lemmon Survey	ADE	2.8 km	MPC · JPL
240926	2006 FW_{8}	—	March 23, 2006	Catalina	CSS	·	2.0 km	MPC · JPL
240927	2006 FB_{10}	—	March 26, 2006	Reedy Creek	J. Broughton	·	2.7 km	MPC · JPL
240928	2006 FM_{15}	—	March 23, 2006	Mount Lemmon	Mount Lemmon Survey	·	1.2 km	MPC · JPL
240929	2006 FU_{15}	—	March 23, 2006	Mount Lemmon	Mount Lemmon Survey	·	1.5 km	MPC · JPL
240930	2006 FN_{22}	—	March 24, 2006	Mount Lemmon	Mount Lemmon Survey	ERI	3.2 km	MPC · JPL
240931	2006 FQ_{29}	—	March 24, 2006	Mount Lemmon	Mount Lemmon Survey	·	3.2 km	MPC · JPL
240932	2006 FE_{31}	—	March 25, 2006	Mount Lemmon	Mount Lemmon Survey	·	1.5 km	MPC · JPL
240933	2006 FT_{31}	—	March 25, 2006	Kitt Peak	Spacewatch	·	1.1 km	MPC · JPL
240934	2006 FK_{42}	—	March 26, 2006	Mount Lemmon	Mount Lemmon Survey	·	3.1 km	MPC · JPL
240935	2006 FW_{49}	—	March 26, 2006	Anderson Mesa	LONEOS	·	1.8 km	MPC · JPL
240936	2006 FU_{50}	—	March 26, 2006	Siding Spring	SSS	·	2.7 km	MPC · JPL
240937	2006 GD_{1}	—	April 2, 2006	Great Shefford	Birtwhistle, P.	·	2.1 km	MPC · JPL
240938	2006 GV_{7}	—	April 2, 2006	Kitt Peak	Spacewatch	·	1.8 km	MPC · JPL
240939	2006 GC_{15}	—	April 2, 2006	Kitt Peak	Spacewatch	·	1.8 km	MPC · JPL
240940	2006 GF_{21}	—	April 2, 2006	Mount Lemmon	Mount Lemmon Survey	(5)	2.7 km	MPC · JPL
240941	2006 GK_{27}	—	April 2, 2006	Kitt Peak	Spacewatch	·	1.7 km	MPC · JPL
240942	2006 GG_{29}	—	April 2, 2006	Kitt Peak	Spacewatch	·	1.5 km	MPC · JPL
240943	2006 GM_{34}	—	April 7, 2006	Kitt Peak	Spacewatch	·	1.7 km	MPC · JPL
240944	2006 GE_{36}	—	April 7, 2006	Anderson Mesa	LONEOS	PHO	1.4 km	MPC · JPL
240945	2006 GP_{36}	—	April 8, 2006	Kitt Peak	Spacewatch	(5)	1.4 km	MPC · JPL
240946	2006 GY_{41}	—	April 8, 2006	Catalina	CSS	·	3.5 km	MPC · JPL
240947	2006 GJ_{42}	—	April 12, 2006	Palomar	NEAT	(18466)	2.9 km	MPC · JPL
240948	2006 GK_{45}	—	April 7, 2006	Kitt Peak	Spacewatch	·	1.4 km	MPC · JPL
240949	2006 GE_{54}	—	April 8, 2006	Kitt Peak	Spacewatch	·	1.3 km	MPC · JPL
240950	2006 HX_{10}	—	April 19, 2006	Kitt Peak	Spacewatch	·	2.1 km	MPC · JPL
240951	2006 HF_{19}	—	April 18, 2006	Kitt Peak	Spacewatch	·	1.6 km	MPC · JPL
240952	2006 HJ_{26}	—	April 20, 2006	Kitt Peak	Spacewatch	·	1.8 km	MPC · JPL
240953	2006 HD_{35}	—	April 19, 2006	Mount Lemmon	Mount Lemmon Survey	(5)	1.4 km	MPC · JPL
240954	2006 HG_{44}	—	April 24, 2006	Mount Lemmon	Mount Lemmon Survey	·	1.4 km	MPC · JPL
240955	2006 HK_{44}	—	April 24, 2006	Mount Lemmon	Mount Lemmon Survey	·	3.1 km	MPC · JPL
240956	2006 HA_{47}	—	April 20, 2006	Kitt Peak	Spacewatch	·	1.4 km	MPC · JPL
240957	2006 HZ_{54}	—	April 21, 2006	Catalina	CSS	KRM	3.7 km	MPC · JPL
240958	2006 HT_{58}	—	April 21, 2006	Catalina	CSS	·	1.7 km	MPC · JPL
240959	2006 HH_{65}	—	April 24, 2006	Kitt Peak	Spacewatch	·	1.8 km	MPC · JPL
240960	2006 HK_{69}	—	April 24, 2006	Mount Lemmon	Mount Lemmon Survey	·	2.0 km	MPC · JPL
240961	2006 HB_{82}	—	April 26, 2006	Kitt Peak	Spacewatch	·	1.4 km	MPC · JPL
240962	2006 HD_{82}	—	April 26, 2006	Kitt Peak	Spacewatch	·	1.8 km	MPC · JPL
240963	2006 HC_{85}	—	April 26, 2006	Siding Spring	SSS	·	2.0 km	MPC · JPL
240964	2006 HO_{88}	—	April 30, 2006	Kitt Peak	Spacewatch	·	2.5 km	MPC · JPL
240965	2006 HU_{113}	—	April 25, 2006	Mount Lemmon	Mount Lemmon Survey	·	1.3 km	MPC · JPL
240966	2006 HU_{152}	—	April 25, 2006	Mount Lemmon	Mount Lemmon Survey	(5)	2.3 km	MPC · JPL
240967	2006 JK_{2}	—	May 1, 2006	Kitt Peak	Spacewatch	·	2.4 km	MPC · JPL
240968	2006 JY_{3}	—	May 2, 2006	Mount Lemmon	Mount Lemmon Survey	·	920 m	MPC · JPL
240969	2006 JH_{10}	—	May 1, 2006	Kitt Peak	Spacewatch	·	3.7 km	MPC · JPL
240970	2006 JX_{12}	—	May 1, 2006	Kitt Peak	Spacewatch	·	1.7 km	MPC · JPL
240971	2006 JB_{16}	—	May 2, 2006	Mount Lemmon	Mount Lemmon Survey	(5)	1.2 km	MPC · JPL
240972	2006 JK_{26}	—	May 4, 2006	Reedy Creek	J. Broughton	RAF	1.5 km	MPC · JPL
240973	2006 JD_{30}	—	May 3, 2006	Kitt Peak	Spacewatch	·	1.2 km	MPC · JPL
240974	2006 JX_{30}	—	May 3, 2006	Mount Lemmon	Mount Lemmon Survey	·	1.2 km	MPC · JPL
240975	2006 JF_{37}	—	May 5, 2006	Kitt Peak	Spacewatch	V	890 m	MPC · JPL
240976	2006 JZ_{40}	—	May 7, 2006	Mount Lemmon	Mount Lemmon Survey	·	1.2 km	MPC · JPL
240977	2006 JP_{42}	—	May 2, 2006	Kitt Peak	Spacewatch	·	1.6 km	MPC · JPL
240978	2006 JC_{45}	—	May 7, 2006	Mount Lemmon	Mount Lemmon Survey	EUN	1.7 km	MPC · JPL
240979	2006 JX_{45}	—	May 8, 2006	Siding Spring	SSS	·	3.6 km	MPC · JPL
240980	2006 JF_{55}	—	May 9, 2006	Mount Lemmon	Mount Lemmon Survey	·	1.5 km	MPC · JPL
240981	2006 JJ_{56}	—	May 4, 2006	Siding Spring	SSS	EUN	1.9 km	MPC · JPL
240982	2006 JL_{57}	—	May 6, 2006	Mount Lemmon	Mount Lemmon Survey	ADE	4.0 km	MPC · JPL
240983	2006 KW_{1}	—	May 20, 2006	Reedy Creek	J. Broughton	EUN	2.1 km	MPC · JPL
240984	2006 KE_{5}	—	May 19, 2006	Mount Lemmon	Mount Lemmon Survey	·	1.3 km	MPC · JPL
240985	2006 KN_{7}	—	May 19, 2006	Mount Lemmon	Mount Lemmon Survey	TIR	4.1 km	MPC · JPL
240986	2006 KY_{10}	—	May 19, 2006	Mount Lemmon	Mount Lemmon Survey	(194)	2.1 km	MPC · JPL
240987	2006 KH_{41}	—	May 19, 2006	Catalina	CSS	·	3.1 km	MPC · JPL
240988	2006 KQ_{41}	—	May 19, 2006	Palomar	NEAT	·	2.0 km	MPC · JPL
240989	2006 KL_{50}	—	May 21, 2006	Kitt Peak	Spacewatch	·	1.4 km	MPC · JPL
240990	2006 KN_{52}	—	May 21, 2006	Kitt Peak	Spacewatch	·	1.4 km	MPC · JPL
240991	2006 KF_{53}	—	May 21, 2006	Kitt Peak	Spacewatch	EUN	1.5 km	MPC · JPL
240992	2006 KW_{54}	—	May 21, 2006	Kitt Peak	Spacewatch	(5)	1.4 km	MPC · JPL
240993	2006 KO_{57}	—	May 22, 2006	Kitt Peak	Spacewatch	·	3.3 km	MPC · JPL
240994	2006 KZ_{61}	—	May 22, 2006	Kitt Peak	Spacewatch	(5)	1.4 km	MPC · JPL
240995	2006 KM_{62}	—	May 22, 2006	Kitt Peak	Spacewatch	·	2.2 km	MPC · JPL
240996	2006 KR_{62}	—	May 22, 2006	Kitt Peak	Spacewatch	·	3.0 km	MPC · JPL
240997	2006 KT_{65}	—	May 24, 2006	Kitt Peak	Spacewatch	(5)	1.7 km	MPC · JPL
240998	2006 KC_{67}	—	May 24, 2006	Mount Lemmon	Mount Lemmon Survey	·	2.6 km	MPC · JPL
240999	2006 KG_{68}	—	May 20, 2006	Catalina	CSS	·	1.4 km	MPC · JPL
241000	2006 KO_{72}	—	May 22, 2006	Siding Spring	SSS	·	2.4 km	MPC · JPL

back to top

== See also ==
- Meanings of minor-planet names: 240001–241000
