= Anthony Taylor =

Anthony Taylor may refer to:

- Anthony Taylor (Medal of Honor) (1837–1894), Medal of Honor recipient in the American Civil War
- Anthony Taylor (bishop) (born 1954), American Roman Catholic bishop
- Anthony Taylor (basketball) (born 1965), American professional basketball player
- Anthony Taylor (referee) (born 1978), English football referee
- Anthony Taylor (fighter) (born 1989), American professional boxer and former MMA fighter
- Anthony Hollis Taylor (1942–2019), American engineer and navigator of space probes at JPL
- Anthony Prince Taylor (born 1990), American drag queen known as The Vixen

== See also ==
- 285937 Anthonytaylor, asteroid
- Tony Taylor (disambiguation)
