= Tony Taylor =

Tony Taylor may refer to:

== Sports ==
- Tony Taylor (baseball) (1935–2020), Cuban second baseman
- Tony Taylor (footballer, born 1946), Scottish footballer
- Tony Taylor (American football) (born 1984), American linebacker
- Tony Taylor (footballer, born 1989), Panamanian footballer
- Tony Taylor (basketball) (born 1990), American basketball player

== Other people ==
- Tony Taylor (GC) (1917–1972), Australian recipient of the George Cross
- Tony Taylor (Irish republican) (fl. 2010s), community activist and former Provisional IRA inmate
- Tony Taylor, music producer of No Boundaries
- Tony Taylor, dog fighter convicted in the Bad Newz Kennels dog fighting investigation case

== See also ==
- Toni Tauler (born 1974), racing cyclist
- Anthony Taylor (disambiguation)
