= List of minor planets: 285001–286000 =

The following is a partial list of minor planets, running from minor-planet number 285001 through 286000, inclusive. The primary data for this and other partial lists is based on JPL's "Small-Body Orbital Elements" and data available from the Minor Planet Center. Critical list information is also provided by the MPC, unless otherwise specified from Lowell Observatory. A detailed description of the table's columns and additional sources are given on the main page including a complete list of every page in this series, and a statistical break-up on the dynamical classification of minor planets.

Also see the summary list of all named bodies in numerical and alphabetical order, and the corresponding naming citations for the number range of this particular list. New namings may only be added to this list after official publication, as the preannouncement of names is condemned by the Working Group for Small Bodies Nomenclature of the International Astronomical Union.

| Near-Earth obj. | MBA (inner) | MBA (outer) | Centaur |
| Mars-crosser | MBA (middle) | Jupiter trojan | Trans-Neptunian obj. |
| Unclassified |

== 285001–285100 ==
| Designation | | | Discovery | | | Properties | | Ref |
| Permanent | Provisional | Named after | Date | Site | Discoverer(s) | Category | Diam. | Ref |
|---|---|---|---|---|---|---|---|---|
| 285001 | 2010 RN_{47} | — | September 28, 2006 | Kitt Peak | Spacewatch | · | 1.2 km | MPC · JPL |
| 285002 | 2010 TU_{131} | — | March 5, 2006 | Anderson Mesa | LONEOS | H | 690 m | MPC · JPL |
| 285003 | 2010 UH_{46} | — | October 14, 2001 | Socorro | LINEAR | PAD | 1.8 km | MPC · JPL |
| 285004 | 2010 UY_{98} | — | September 29, 2003 | Apache Point | SDSS | · | 850 m | MPC · JPL |
| 285005 | 2010 VG_{120} | — | December 15, 2001 | Socorro | LINEAR | · | 3.2 km | MPC · JPL |
| 285006 | 2010 VV_{132} | — | October 15, 1995 | Kitt Peak | Spacewatch | · | 1.3 km | MPC · JPL |
| 285007 | 2010 XO_{55} | — | September 30, 2006 | Mount Lemmon | Mount Lemmon Survey | MAS | 860 m | MPC · JPL |
| 285008 | 2011 AP_{8} | — | September 30, 2005 | Mount Lemmon | Mount Lemmon Survey | EOS | 2.7 km | MPC · JPL |
| 285009 | 2011 AJ_{20} | — | December 9, 2004 | Catalina | CSS | · | 3.0 km | MPC · JPL |
| 285010 | 2011 AM_{66} | — | July 9, 2005 | Kitt Peak | Spacewatch | · | 740 m | MPC · JPL |
| 285011 | 2011 BY_{19} | — | April 5, 2000 | Socorro | LINEAR | NYS | 1.4 km | MPC · JPL |
| 285012 | 2011 BP_{36} | — | February 7, 2002 | Palomar | NEAT | · | 1.9 km | MPC · JPL |
| 285013 | 2011 BT_{89} | — | July 2, 2008 | Kitt Peak | Spacewatch | · | 4.1 km | MPC · JPL |
| 285014 | 2011 BF_{94} | — | January 28, 2006 | Mount Lemmon | Mount Lemmon Survey | · | 3.6 km | MPC · JPL |
| 285015 | 2011 BD_{114} | — | March 25, 1995 | Kitt Peak | Spacewatch | · | 3.5 km | MPC · JPL |
| 285016 | 2011 CZ_{7} | — | September 3, 2004 | Palomar | NEAT | · | 4.3 km | MPC · JPL |
| 285017 | 2011 CZ_{20} | — | December 25, 2005 | Kitt Peak | Spacewatch | · | 2.1 km | MPC · JPL |
| 285018 | 2011 CA_{71} | — | September 19, 2001 | Socorro | LINEAR | CYB | 4.0 km | MPC · JPL |
| 285019 | 2011 CW_{77} | — | February 26, 2007 | Mount Lemmon | Mount Lemmon Survey | · | 1.3 km | MPC · JPL |
| 285020 | 2011 DG_{4} | — | April 3, 2000 | Socorro | LINEAR | EUP | 5.5 km | MPC · JPL |
| 285021 | 2011 DW_{10} | — | January 7, 2005 | Catalina | CSS | · | 4.1 km | MPC · JPL |
| 285022 | 2011 DF_{18} | — | March 15, 2007 | Kitt Peak | Spacewatch | · | 1.4 km | MPC · JPL |
| 285023 | 2011 DT_{21} | — | January 28, 2006 | Kitt Peak | Spacewatch | · | 2.1 km | MPC · JPL |
| 285024 | 2011 DD_{40} | — | September 19, 2003 | Palomar | NEAT | · | 4.8 km | MPC · JPL |
| 285025 | 2011 DZ_{40} | — | September 26, 2003 | Apache Point | SDSS | · | 1.8 km | MPC · JPL |
| 285026 | 2011 DA_{43} | — | September 19, 2003 | Kitt Peak | Spacewatch | · | 3.5 km | MPC · JPL |
| 285027 | 2011 DX_{45} | — | October 5, 2002 | Apache Point | SDSS | THM | 2.9 km | MPC · JPL |
| 285028 | 2011 EO | — | December 10, 2004 | Kitt Peak | Spacewatch | · | 2.8 km | MPC · JPL |
| 285029 | 2011 EW_{10} | — | March 27, 2003 | Kitt Peak | Spacewatch | (5) | 930 m | MPC · JPL |
| 285030 | 2011 EJ_{11} | — | September 28, 2002 | Haleakala | NEAT | slow | 4.7 km | MPC · JPL |
| 285031 | 2011 EO_{14} | — | May 26, 2006 | Mount Lemmon | Mount Lemmon Survey | THM | 3.3 km | MPC · JPL |
| 285032 | 2011 EX_{26} | — | November 4, 2005 | Kitt Peak | Spacewatch | AGN · slow | 1.8 km | MPC · JPL |
| 285033 | 2011 ED_{40} | — | November 18, 1998 | Kitt Peak | Spacewatch | · | 2.9 km | MPC · JPL |
| 285034 | 2011 EJ_{42} | — | October 25, 2005 | Mount Lemmon | Mount Lemmon Survey | · | 1.4 km | MPC · JPL |
| 285035 | 2011 EC_{44} | — | February 3, 2000 | Socorro | LINEAR | EOS | 2.4 km | MPC · JPL |
| 285036 | 2011 EJ_{51} | — | April 6, 2000 | Anderson Mesa | LONEOS | · | 1.3 km | MPC · JPL |
| 285037 | 2011 ES_{51} | — | December 29, 2003 | Kitt Peak | Spacewatch | · | 630 m | MPC · JPL |
| 285038 | 2011 EU_{54} | — | March 26, 2006 | Kitt Peak | Spacewatch | · | 2.6 km | MPC · JPL |
| 285039 | 2011 EY_{54} | — | August 30, 2002 | Kitt Peak | Spacewatch | · | 3.0 km | MPC · JPL |
| 285040 | 2011 EO_{77} | — | October 19, 2003 | Apache Point | SDSS | KOR | 1.7 km | MPC · JPL |
| 285041 | 2011 FC_{5} | — | May 20, 2006 | Catalina | CSS | · | 4.7 km | MPC · JPL |
| 285042 | 2011 FZ_{5} | — | October 22, 2003 | Apache Point | SDSS | · | 1.9 km | MPC · JPL |
| 285043 | 2011 FJ_{10} | — | September 11, 2005 | Kitt Peak | Spacewatch | · | 1.2 km | MPC · JPL |
| 285044 | 2011 FT_{10} | — | March 12, 2007 | Kitt Peak | Spacewatch | · | 1.4 km | MPC · JPL |
| 285045 | 2011 FW_{97} | — | December 3, 2005 | Kitt Peak | Spacewatch | · | 1.5 km | MPC · JPL |
| 285046 | 2011 FZ_{132} | — | March 30, 2000 | Kitt Peak | Spacewatch | THM | 2.3 km | MPC · JPL |
| 285047 | 2011 FG_{147} | — | December 25, 2005 | Anderson Mesa | LONEOS | · | 3.4 km | MPC · JPL |
| 285048 | 2011 FJ_{154} | — | March 21, 2002 | Kitt Peak | Spacewatch | · | 2.6 km | MPC · JPL |
| 285049 | 2011 GM_{32} | — | November 4, 2005 | Kitt Peak | Spacewatch | NYS | 820 m | MPC · JPL |
| 285050 | 2011 GU_{32} | — | January 29, 2003 | Apache Point | SDSS | · | 1.1 km | MPC · JPL |
| 285051 | 2011 GD_{43} | — | December 14, 2001 | Socorro | LINEAR | · | 1.5 km | MPC · JPL |
| 285052 | 2011 GX_{85} | — | July 15, 1998 | Kitt Peak | Spacewatch | · | 3.0 km | MPC · JPL |
| 285053 | 2011 HN_{8} | — | May 15, 1996 | Kitt Peak | Spacewatch | · | 2.6 km | MPC · JPL |
| 285054 | 2011 HK_{18} | — | April 8, 2002 | Palomar | NEAT | · | 2.8 km | MPC · JPL |
| 285055 | 2011 HT_{18} | — | December 6, 2005 | Kitt Peak | Spacewatch | · | 2.8 km | MPC · JPL |
| 285056 | 2011 HG_{25} | — | November 6, 2005 | Kitt Peak | Spacewatch | MAS | 800 m | MPC · JPL |
| 285057 | 2011 HW_{25} | — | July 24, 2003 | Palomar | NEAT | · | 1.9 km | MPC · JPL |
| 285058 | 2011 HK_{30} | — | April 3, 2002 | Kitt Peak | Spacewatch | · | 4.7 km | MPC · JPL |
| 285059 | 2011 HV_{60} | — | April 29, 2011 | Mount Lemmon | Mount Lemmon Survey | EOS | 2.6 km | MPC · JPL |
| 285060 | 2011 HT_{91} | — | November 20, 2004 | Kitt Peak | Spacewatch | · | 2.6 km | MPC · JPL |
| 285061 | 2011 HZ_{100} | — | October 18, 2004 | Kitt Peak | Deep Ecliptic Survey | KON | 2.9 km | MPC · JPL |
| 285062 | 2011 JK_{29} | — | February 27, 2007 | Kitt Peak | Spacewatch | V | 850 m | MPC · JPL |
| 285063 | 2011 KV | — | March 28, 1995 | Kitt Peak | Spacewatch | · | 2.7 km | MPC · JPL |
| 285064 | 2011 KG_{3} | — | October 20, 2003 | Kitt Peak | Spacewatch | · | 2.6 km | MPC · JPL |
| 285065 | 2011 KM_{11} | — | April 12, 2004 | Palomar | NEAT | · | 800 m | MPC · JPL |
| 285066 | 2011 KO_{11} | — | August 21, 2004 | Catalina | CSS | NYS | 1.6 km | MPC · JPL |
| 285067 | 2011 KS_{20} | — | November 18, 2008 | Kitt Peak | Spacewatch | · | 2.2 km | MPC · JPL |
| 285068 | 2011 KA_{23} | — | April 13, 1996 | Kitt Peak | Spacewatch | KOR | 1.5 km | MPC · JPL |
| 285069 | 2011 KB_{23} | — | October 3, 2008 | Kitt Peak | Spacewatch | · | 1.2 km | MPC · JPL |
| 285070 | 2011 KO_{24} | — | January 16, 2005 | Kitt Peak | Spacewatch | AGN | 1.3 km | MPC · JPL |
| 285071 | 2011 KK_{25} | — | October 27, 2008 | Mount Lemmon | Mount Lemmon Survey | · | 2.8 km | MPC · JPL |
| 285072 | 2011 KQ_{25} | — | March 25, 2000 | Kitt Peak | Spacewatch | · | 2.3 km | MPC · JPL |
| 285073 | 2011 KH_{28} | — | August 30, 2005 | Kitt Peak | Spacewatch | · | 770 m | MPC · JPL |
| 285074 | 2011 KO_{28} | — | January 18, 1996 | Kitt Peak | Spacewatch | · | 2.8 km | MPC · JPL |
| 285075 | 2011 KF_{33} | — | March 14, 2004 | Kitt Peak | Spacewatch | · | 890 m | MPC · JPL |
| 285076 | 2011 KG_{33} | — | August 16, 2001 | Palomar | NEAT | URS | 5.0 km | MPC · JPL |
| 285077 | 2227 T-2 | — | September 29, 1973 | Palomar | C. J. van Houten, I. van Houten-Groeneveld, T. Gehrels | · | 1.5 km | MPC · JPL |
| 285078 | 2459 T-3 | — | October 16, 1977 | Palomar | C. J. van Houten, I. van Houten-Groeneveld, T. Gehrels | · | 1.3 km | MPC · JPL |
| 285079 | 1981 EQ_{36} | — | March 7, 1981 | Siding Spring | S. J. Bus | · | 2.8 km | MPC · JPL |
| 285080 | 1981 EB_{47} | — | March 2, 1981 | Siding Spring | S. J. Bus | · | 1.6 km | MPC · JPL |
| 285081 | 1991 FD_{1} | — | March 18, 1991 | Kitt Peak | Spacewatch | · | 1.3 km | MPC · JPL |
| 285082 | 1991 TJ_{15} | — | October 6, 1991 | Palomar | Lowe, A. | BAR | 1.6 km | MPC · JPL |
| 285083 | 1992 DS_{8} | — | February 29, 1992 | La Silla | UESAC | · | 1.8 km | MPC · JPL |
| 285084 | 1992 SY_{10} | — | September 28, 1992 | Kitt Peak | Spacewatch | · | 2.4 km | MPC · JPL |
| 285085 | 1992 UM_{7} | — | October 18, 1992 | Kitt Peak | Spacewatch | · | 840 m | MPC · JPL |
| 285086 | 1993 FA_{38} | — | March 19, 1993 | La Silla | UESAC | ADE | 3.4 km | MPC · JPL |
| 285087 | 1993 HN_{4} | — | April 21, 1993 | Kitt Peak | Spacewatch | · | 1.7 km | MPC · JPL |
| 285088 | 1993 TQ_{7} | — | October 9, 1993 | Kitt Peak | Spacewatch | NEM | 2.7 km | MPC · JPL |
| 285089 | 1993 TT_{23} | — | October 9, 1993 | La Silla | E. W. Elst | · | 1.6 km | MPC · JPL |
| 285090 | 1993 TV_{24} | — | October 9, 1993 | La Silla | E. W. Elst | · | 800 m | MPC · JPL |
| 285091 | 1994 AL_{7} | — | January 7, 1994 | Kitt Peak | Spacewatch | · | 1.3 km | MPC · JPL |
| 285092 | 1994 AP_{14} | — | January 13, 1994 | Kitt Peak | Spacewatch | · | 1.7 km | MPC · JPL |
| 285093 | 1994 HC | — | April 19, 1994 | Kitt Peak | Spacewatch | · | 1.2 km | MPC · JPL |
| 285094 | 1994 PR_{7} | — | August 10, 1994 | La Silla | E. W. Elst | (5) | 1.9 km | MPC · JPL |
| 285095 | 1994 RC_{3} | — | September 2, 1994 | Kitt Peak | Spacewatch | · | 810 m | MPC · JPL |
| 285096 | 1994 TZ_{10} | — | October 9, 1994 | Kitt Peak | Spacewatch | · | 1.3 km | MPC · JPL |
| 285097 | 1994 UM_{8} | — | October 28, 1994 | Kitt Peak | Spacewatch | · | 3.1 km | MPC · JPL |
| 285098 | 1994 UZ_{8} | — | October 28, 1994 | Kitt Peak | Spacewatch | GEF | 1.5 km | MPC · JPL |
| 285099 | 1994 VT_{3} | — | November 1, 1994 | Kitt Peak | Spacewatch | · | 3.0 km | MPC · JPL |
| 285100 | 1994 WX_{7} | — | November 28, 1994 | Kitt Peak | Spacewatch | · | 1.3 km | MPC · JPL |

== 285101–285200 ==
back to top

| Designation | | | Discovery | | | Properties | | Ref |
| Permanent | Provisional | Named after | Date | Site | Discoverer(s) | Category | Diam. | Ref |
|---|---|---|---|---|---|---|---|---|
| 285101 | 1994 WD_{13} | — | November 28, 1994 | Kitt Peak | Spacewatch | VER | 4.0 km | MPC · JPL |
| 285102 | 1995 BZ_{5} | — | January 28, 1995 | Kitt Peak | Spacewatch | · | 810 m | MPC · JPL |
| 285103 | 1995 BW_{7} | — | January 29, 1995 | Kitt Peak | Spacewatch | · | 600 m | MPC · JPL |
| 285104 | 1995 CR_{3} | — | February 1, 1995 | Kitt Peak | Spacewatch | NYS | 1.0 km | MPC · JPL |
| 285105 | 1995 CS_{4} | — | February 1, 1995 | Kitt Peak | Spacewatch | · | 2.7 km | MPC · JPL |
| 285106 | 1995 FL_{7} | — | March 25, 1995 | Kitt Peak | Spacewatch | · | 2.5 km | MPC · JPL |
| 285107 | 1995 HQ_{2} | — | April 25, 1995 | Kitt Peak | Spacewatch | V | 890 m | MPC · JPL |
| 285108 | 1995 HB_{3} | — | April 26, 1995 | Kitt Peak | Spacewatch | NYS | 1.3 km | MPC · JPL |
| 285109 | 1995 JS | — | May 1, 1995 | Kitt Peak | Spacewatch | VER | 4.7 km | MPC · JPL |
| 285110 | 1995 MA_{1} | — | June 29, 1995 | Kitt Peak | Spacewatch | AMO +1km | 1.3 km | MPC · JPL |
| 285111 | 1995 MX_{3} | — | June 29, 1995 | Kitt Peak | Spacewatch | · | 2.9 km | MPC · JPL |
| 285112 | 1995 MU_{6} | — | June 29, 1995 | Kitt Peak | Spacewatch | · | 1.6 km | MPC · JPL |
| 285113 | 1995 OE_{13} | — | July 22, 1995 | Kitt Peak | Spacewatch | · | 2.3 km | MPC · JPL |
| 285114 | 1995 OY_{16} | — | July 27, 1995 | Kitt Peak | Spacewatch | EOS | 2.3 km | MPC · JPL |
| 285115 | 1995 QB_{4} | — | August 17, 1995 | Kitt Peak | Spacewatch | · | 2.5 km | MPC · JPL |
| 285116 | 1995 SN_{1} | — | September 18, 1995 | Modra | A. Galád, A. Pravda | · | 700 m | MPC · JPL |
| 285117 | 1995 ST_{8} | — | September 17, 1995 | Kitt Peak | Spacewatch | · | 1.5 km | MPC · JPL |
| 285118 | 1995 SE_{14} | — | September 18, 1995 | Kitt Peak | Spacewatch | KOR | 1.3 km | MPC · JPL |
| 285119 | 1995 ST_{14} | — | September 18, 1995 | Kitt Peak | Spacewatch | · | 2.2 km | MPC · JPL |
| 285120 | 1995 SN_{21} | — | September 19, 1995 | Kitt Peak | Spacewatch | · | 2.2 km | MPC · JPL |
| 285121 | 1995 SO_{25} | — | September 19, 1995 | Kitt Peak | Spacewatch | AEO | 1.3 km | MPC · JPL |
| 285122 | 1995 SD_{36} | — | September 23, 1995 | Kitt Peak | Spacewatch | MAS | 810 m | MPC · JPL |
| 285123 | 1995 SG_{42} | — | September 25, 1995 | Kitt Peak | Spacewatch | MAS | 960 m | MPC · JPL |
| 285124 | 1995 SK_{44} | — | September 25, 1995 | Kitt Peak | Spacewatch | EOS | 2.0 km | MPC · JPL |
| 285125 | 1995 SQ_{45} | — | September 26, 1995 | Kitt Peak | Spacewatch | · | 1.1 km | MPC · JPL |
| 285126 | 1995 SZ_{48} | — | September 21, 1995 | Kitt Peak | Spacewatch | · | 1.6 km | MPC · JPL |
| 285127 | 1995 SR_{50} | — | September 26, 1995 | Kitt Peak | Spacewatch | EOS | 2.5 km | MPC · JPL |
| 285128 | 1995 SP_{51} | — | September 26, 1995 | Kitt Peak | Spacewatch | · | 1.2 km | MPC · JPL |
| 285129 | 1995 SD_{62} | — | September 25, 1995 | Kitt Peak | Spacewatch | · | 1.2 km | MPC · JPL |
| 285130 | 1995 SZ_{62} | — | September 25, 1995 | Kitt Peak | Spacewatch | NYS | 1.3 km | MPC · JPL |
| 285131 | 1995 SA_{63} | — | September 25, 1995 | Kitt Peak | Spacewatch | V | 850 m | MPC · JPL |
| 285132 | 1995 SY_{63} | — | September 26, 1995 | Kitt Peak | Spacewatch | · | 600 m | MPC · JPL |
| 285133 | 1995 SJ_{64} | — | September 18, 1995 | Kitt Peak | Spacewatch | HOF | 2.9 km | MPC · JPL |
| 285134 | 1995 SA_{72} | — | September 19, 1995 | Kitt Peak | Spacewatch | · | 1.6 km | MPC · JPL |
| 285135 | 1995 SB_{72} | — | September 19, 1995 | Kitt Peak | Spacewatch | VER | 3.2 km | MPC · JPL |
| 285136 | 1995 SR_{76} | — | September 20, 1995 | Kitt Peak | Spacewatch | · | 4.2 km | MPC · JPL |
| 285137 | 1995 SN_{80} | — | September 29, 1995 | Kitt Peak | Spacewatch | THM | 1.9 km | MPC · JPL |
| 285138 | 1995 SZ_{81} | — | September 22, 1995 | Kitt Peak | Spacewatch | AST | 1.7 km | MPC · JPL |
| 285139 | 1995 SO_{87} | — | September 26, 1995 | Kitt Peak | Spacewatch | LIX | 4.4 km | MPC · JPL |
| 285140 | 1995 TM_{9} | — | October 1, 1995 | Kitt Peak | Spacewatch | NYS | 1.4 km | MPC · JPL |
| 285141 | 1995 TG_{12} | — | October 15, 1995 | Kitt Peak | Spacewatch | · | 4.3 km | MPC · JPL |
| 285142 | 1995 UG_{1} | — | October 22, 1995 | Kleť | Kleť | · | 2.0 km | MPC · JPL |
| 285143 | 1995 UZ_{4} | — | October 23, 1995 | Xinglong | SCAP | H | 690 m | MPC · JPL |
| 285144 | 1995 UX_{12} | — | October 17, 1995 | Kitt Peak | Spacewatch | · | 910 m | MPC · JPL |
| 285145 | 1995 UU_{15} | — | October 17, 1995 | Kitt Peak | Spacewatch | · | 2.8 km | MPC · JPL |
| 285146 | 1995 UL_{17} | — | October 17, 1995 | Kitt Peak | Spacewatch | NYS | 1.1 km | MPC · JPL |
| 285147 | 1995 UA_{18} | — | October 18, 1995 | Kitt Peak | Spacewatch | · | 1.0 km | MPC · JPL |
| 285148 | 1995 UL_{20} | — | October 19, 1995 | Kitt Peak | Spacewatch | · | 1.5 km | MPC · JPL |
| 285149 | 1995 UN_{50} | — | October 17, 1995 | Kitt Peak | Spacewatch | · | 5.5 km | MPC · JPL |
| 285150 | 1995 UD_{62} | — | October 25, 1995 | Kitt Peak | Spacewatch | · | 2.5 km | MPC · JPL |
| 285151 | 1995 UB_{63} | — | October 25, 1995 | Kitt Peak | Spacewatch | · | 830 m | MPC · JPL |
| 285152 | 1995 UR_{65} | — | October 27, 1995 | Kitt Peak | Spacewatch | GEF | 1.7 km | MPC · JPL |
| 285153 | 1995 UA_{70} | — | October 19, 1995 | Kitt Peak | Spacewatch | EOS | 2.5 km | MPC · JPL |
| 285154 | 1995 UM_{77} | — | October 22, 1995 | Kitt Peak | Spacewatch | · | 2.5 km | MPC · JPL |
| 285155 | 1995 VF_{4} | — | November 14, 1995 | Kitt Peak | Spacewatch | V | 830 m | MPC · JPL |
| 285156 | 1995 VR_{8} | — | November 14, 1995 | Kitt Peak | Spacewatch | · | 1.4 km | MPC · JPL |
| 285157 | 1995 VY_{12} | — | November 15, 1995 | Kitt Peak | Spacewatch | (194) | 2.3 km | MPC · JPL |
| 285158 | 1995 VA_{13} | — | November 15, 1995 | Kitt Peak | Spacewatch | · | 3.0 km | MPC · JPL |
| 285159 | 1995 VK_{18} | — | November 15, 1995 | Kitt Peak | Spacewatch | · | 2.3 km | MPC · JPL |
| 285160 | 1995 WP_{6} | — | November 21, 1995 | Kitt Peak | Spacewatch | · | 980 m | MPC · JPL |
| 285161 | 1995 WA_{10} | — | November 16, 1995 | Kitt Peak | Spacewatch | BRA | 1.9 km | MPC · JPL |
| 285162 | 1995 WB_{14} | — | November 16, 1995 | Kitt Peak | Spacewatch | · | 1.3 km | MPC · JPL |
| 285163 | 1995 WK_{16} | — | November 17, 1995 | Kitt Peak | Spacewatch | · | 2.9 km | MPC · JPL |
| 285164 | 1995 WS_{36} | — | November 21, 1995 | Kitt Peak | Spacewatch | · | 580 m | MPC · JPL |
| 285165 | 1995 XC_{3} | — | December 14, 1995 | Kitt Peak | Spacewatch | · | 1.4 km | MPC · JPL |
| 285166 | 1995 YE_{11} | — | December 18, 1995 | Kitt Peak | Spacewatch | · | 1.2 km | MPC · JPL |
| 285167 | 1995 YJ_{11} | — | December 18, 1995 | Kitt Peak | Spacewatch | · | 1.6 km | MPC · JPL |
| 285168 | 1995 YK_{14} | — | December 20, 1995 | Kitt Peak | Spacewatch | · | 1.7 km | MPC · JPL |
| 285169 | 1996 AN_{7} | — | January 12, 1996 | Kitt Peak | Spacewatch | · | 1.6 km | MPC · JPL |
| 285170 | 1996 BZ_{6} | — | January 19, 1996 | Kitt Peak | Spacewatch | MAS | 630 m | MPC · JPL |
| 285171 | 1996 ET_{5} | — | March 11, 1996 | Kitt Peak | Spacewatch | · | 1.8 km | MPC · JPL |
| 285172 | 1996 ER_{6} | — | March 11, 1996 | Kitt Peak | Spacewatch | · | 2.9 km | MPC · JPL |
| 285173 | 1996 ES_{8} | — | March 12, 1996 | Kitt Peak | Spacewatch | · | 2.0 km | MPC · JPL |
| 285174 | 1996 FY_{5} | — | March 17, 1996 | Kitt Peak | Spacewatch | · | 2.7 km | MPC · JPL |
| 285175 | 1996 GJ_{3} | — | April 9, 1996 | Kitt Peak | Spacewatch | · | 1.7 km | MPC · JPL |
| 285176 | 1996 GQ_{6} | — | April 12, 1996 | Kitt Peak | Spacewatch | · | 2.1 km | MPC · JPL |
| 285177 | 1996 GU_{10} | — | April 13, 1996 | Kitt Peak | Spacewatch | · | 2.4 km | MPC · JPL |
| 285178 | 1996 OZ | — | July 18, 1996 | Socorro | R. Weber | · | 4.0 km | MPC · JPL |
| 285179 | 1996 TY_{11} | — | October 15, 1996 | Kitt Peak | Spacewatch | APO | 480 m | MPC · JPL |
| 285180 | 1996 TH_{16} | — | October 4, 1996 | Kitt Peak | Spacewatch | L4 | 11 km | MPC · JPL |
| 285181 | 1996 TA_{17} | — | October 4, 1996 | Kitt Peak | Spacewatch | · | 2.1 km | MPC · JPL |
| 285182 | 1996 TU_{18} | — | October 4, 1996 | Kitt Peak | Spacewatch | · | 2.6 km | MPC · JPL |
| 285183 | 1996 TA_{29} | — | October 7, 1996 | Kitt Peak | Spacewatch | PAD | 2.2 km | MPC · JPL |
| 285184 | 1996 TD_{36} | — | October 11, 1996 | Kitt Peak | Spacewatch | · | 920 m | MPC · JPL |
| 285185 | 1996 TL_{37} | — | October 12, 1996 | Kitt Peak | Spacewatch | · | 2.0 km | MPC · JPL |
| 285186 | 1996 TK_{39} | — | October 8, 1996 | La Silla | E. W. Elst | · | 3.0 km | MPC · JPL |
| 285187 | 1996 TS_{46} | — | October 10, 1996 | Kitt Peak | Spacewatch | · | 1.2 km | MPC · JPL |
| 285188 | 1996 VC_{10} | — | November 3, 1996 | Kitt Peak | Spacewatch | · | 2.6 km | MPC · JPL |
| 285189 | 1996 VU_{10} | — | November 4, 1996 | Kitt Peak | Spacewatch | · | 2.6 km | MPC · JPL |
| 285190 | 1996 VV_{10} | — | November 4, 1996 | Kitt Peak | Spacewatch | V | 800 m | MPC · JPL |
| 285191 | 1996 VK_{13} | — | November 5, 1996 | Kitt Peak | Spacewatch | · | 3.9 km | MPC · JPL |
| 285192 | 1996 VO_{13} | — | November 5, 1996 | Kitt Peak | Spacewatch | · | 790 m | MPC · JPL |
| 285193 | 1996 VW_{16} | — | November 6, 1996 | Kitt Peak | Spacewatch | KOR | 1.4 km | MPC · JPL |
| 285194 | 1996 VG_{18} | — | November 6, 1996 | Kitt Peak | Spacewatch | · | 4.8 km | MPC · JPL |
| 285195 | 1996 VB_{23} | — | November 9, 1996 | Kitt Peak | Spacewatch | · | 3.4 km | MPC · JPL |
| 285196 | 1996 VS_{28} | — | November 13, 1996 | Kitt Peak | Spacewatch | · | 2.8 km | MPC · JPL |
| 285197 | 1996 VU_{34} | — | November 8, 1996 | Kitt Peak | Spacewatch | AEO | 1.4 km | MPC · JPL |
| 285198 | 1996 VA_{42} | — | November 8, 1996 | Kitt Peak | Spacewatch | · | 1.4 km | MPC · JPL |
| 285199 | 1996 XP_{4} | — | December 6, 1996 | Kitt Peak | Spacewatch | · | 1.6 km | MPC · JPL |
| 285200 | 1996 XE_{7} | — | December 1, 1996 | Kitt Peak | Spacewatch | · | 3.2 km | MPC · JPL |

== 285201–285300 ==
back to top

| Designation | | | Discovery | | | Properties | | Ref |
| Permanent | Provisional | Named after | Date | Site | Discoverer(s) | Category | Diam. | Ref |
|---|---|---|---|---|---|---|---|---|
| 285201 | 1996 XM_{7} | — | December 1, 1996 | Kitt Peak | Spacewatch | · | 2.4 km | MPC · JPL |
| 285202 | 1996 XY_{9} | — | December 1, 1996 | Kitt Peak | Spacewatch | · | 1.4 km | MPC · JPL |
| 285203 | 1996 XD_{16} | — | December 4, 1996 | Kitt Peak | Spacewatch | · | 710 m | MPC · JPL |
| 285204 | 1996 XF_{16} | — | December 4, 1996 | Kitt Peak | Spacewatch | · | 2.0 km | MPC · JPL |
| 285205 | 1996 XD_{18} | — | December 7, 1996 | Kitt Peak | Spacewatch | · | 1.7 km | MPC · JPL |
| 285206 | 1996 XY_{20} | — | December 5, 1996 | Kitt Peak | Spacewatch | · | 1.6 km | MPC · JPL |
| 285207 | 1996 XT_{23} | — | December 1, 1996 | Kitt Peak | Spacewatch | · | 1.4 km | MPC · JPL |
| 285208 | 1996 XB_{24} | — | December 5, 1996 | Kitt Peak | Spacewatch | · | 1.5 km | MPC · JPL |
| 285209 | 1996 XP_{34} | — | December 9, 1996 | Kitt Peak | Spacewatch | · | 3.7 km | MPC · JPL |
| 285210 | 1997 BK_{6} | — | January 31, 1997 | Kitt Peak | Spacewatch | · | 1.3 km | MPC · JPL |
| 285211 | 1997 BS_{8} | — | January 31, 1997 | Kitt Peak | Spacewatch | EOS | 2.4 km | MPC · JPL |
| 285212 | 1997 CU_{12} | — | February 3, 1997 | Kitt Peak | Spacewatch | · | 860 m | MPC · JPL |
| 285213 | 1997 EM_{3} | — | March 2, 1997 | Kitt Peak | Spacewatch | · | 1.5 km | MPC · JPL |
| 285214 | 1997 EV_{3} | — | March 2, 1997 | Kitt Peak | Spacewatch | JUN | 1.8 km | MPC · JPL |
| 285215 | 1997 EG_{6} | — | March 6, 1997 | Prescott | P. G. Comba | (194) | 2.8 km | MPC · JPL |
| 285216 | 1997 EF_{9} | — | March 2, 1997 | Kitt Peak | Spacewatch | · | 2.4 km | MPC · JPL |
| 285217 | 1997 EK_{28} | — | March 7, 1997 | Kitt Peak | Spacewatch | · | 1.7 km | MPC · JPL |
| 285218 | 1997 GE_{3} | — | April 7, 1997 | Kitt Peak | Spacewatch | THM | 2.4 km | MPC · JPL |
| 285219 | 1997 GK_{27} | — | April 9, 1997 | Kitt Peak | Spacewatch | · | 2.7 km | MPC · JPL |
| 285220 | 1997 JQ_{3} | — | May 5, 1997 | Mauna Kea | Veillet, C. | · | 2.7 km | MPC · JPL |
| 285221 | 1997 KA_{2} | — | May 28, 1997 | Kitt Peak | Spacewatch | · | 2.7 km | MPC · JPL |
| 285222 | 1997 KD_{2} | — | May 28, 1997 | Kitt Peak | Spacewatch | · | 3.1 km | MPC · JPL |
| 285223 | 1997 MV_{7} | — | June 29, 1997 | Kitt Peak | Spacewatch | L5 | 13 km | MPC · JPL |
| 285224 | 1997 NC_{2} | — | July 3, 1997 | Kitt Peak | Spacewatch | · | 3.4 km | MPC · JPL |
| 285225 | 1997 NG_{4} | — | July 6, 1997 | Kitt Peak | Spacewatch | · | 4.5 km | MPC · JPL |
| 285226 | 1997 QU_{2} | — | August 31, 1997 | Kleť | Z. Moravec | GEF | 1.6 km | MPC · JPL |
| 285227 | 1997 SR_{4} | — | September 27, 1997 | Kitt Peak | Spacewatch | (1547) | 1.6 km | MPC · JPL |
| 285228 | 1997 SC_{12} | — | September 27, 1997 | Kitt Peak | Spacewatch | L4 | 8.2 km | MPC · JPL |
| 285229 | 1997 SP_{12} | — | September 28, 1997 | Kitt Peak | Spacewatch | · | 1.0 km | MPC · JPL |
| 285230 | 1997 ST_{14} | — | September 28, 1997 | Kitt Peak | Spacewatch | · | 1.9 km | MPC · JPL |
| 285231 | 1997 SJ_{19} | — | September 28, 1997 | Kitt Peak | Spacewatch | · | 1.1 km | MPC · JPL |
| 285232 | 1997 SS_{21} | — | September 29, 1997 | Kitt Peak | Spacewatch | L4 | 8.6 km | MPC · JPL |
| 285233 | 1997 SN_{22} | — | September 29, 1997 | Kitt Peak | Spacewatch | HIL · 3:2 | 6.7 km | MPC · JPL |
| 285234 | 1997 SA_{27} | — | September 29, 1997 | Kitt Peak | Spacewatch | · | 3.2 km | MPC · JPL |
| 285235 | 1997 TB_{7} | — | October 2, 1997 | Caussols | ODAS | · | 2.7 km | MPC · JPL |
| 285236 | 1997 TF_{12} | — | October 2, 1997 | Kitt Peak | Spacewatch | L4 | 9.7 km | MPC · JPL |
| 285237 | 1997 TT_{19} | — | October 2, 1997 | Kitt Peak | Spacewatch | · | 2.0 km | MPC · JPL |
| 285238 | 1997 WX_{10} | — | November 22, 1997 | Kitt Peak | Spacewatch | EUN | 1.1 km | MPC · JPL |
| 285239 | 1997 WC_{14} | — | November 22, 1997 | Kitt Peak | Spacewatch | · | 1.3 km | MPC · JPL |
| 285240 | 1997 WW_{15} | — | November 23, 1997 | Kitt Peak | Spacewatch | MAS | 600 m | MPC · JPL |
| 285241 | 1997 WV_{24} | — | November 28, 1997 | Kitt Peak | Spacewatch | · | 900 m | MPC · JPL |
| 285242 | 1997 WU_{26} | — | November 28, 1997 | Kitt Peak | Spacewatch | · | 4.4 km | MPC · JPL |
| 285243 | 1997 YS_{15} | — | December 29, 1997 | Kitt Peak | Spacewatch | · | 870 m | MPC · JPL |
| 285244 | 1998 BO_{3} | — | January 18, 1998 | Kitt Peak | Spacewatch | · | 960 m | MPC · JPL |
| 285245 | 1998 BH_{21} | — | January 22, 1998 | Kitt Peak | Spacewatch | · | 2.1 km | MPC · JPL |
| 285246 | 1998 BM_{24} | — | January 26, 1998 | Kitt Peak | Spacewatch | · | 2.9 km | MPC · JPL |
| 285247 | 1998 BG_{46} | — | January 26, 1998 | Kitt Peak | Spacewatch | · | 2.9 km | MPC · JPL |
| 285248 | 1998 DZ_{6} | — | February 17, 1998 | Kitt Peak | Spacewatch | · | 1.0 km | MPC · JPL |
| 285249 | 1998 DP_{7} | — | February 22, 1998 | Kitt Peak | Spacewatch | · | 2.1 km | MPC · JPL |
| 285250 | 1998 DH_{8} | — | February 21, 1998 | Xinglong | SCAP | · | 1.9 km | MPC · JPL |
| 285251 | 1998 DD_{27} | — | February 24, 1998 | Kitt Peak | Spacewatch | KON | 2.5 km | MPC · JPL |
| 285252 | 1998 FK_{14} | — | March 25, 1998 | Socorro | LINEAR | PHO | 2.7 km | MPC · JPL |
| 285253 | 1998 HF | — | April 17, 1998 | Kitt Peak | Spacewatch | MAS | 870 m | MPC · JPL |
| 285254 | 1998 HK_{2} | — | April 19, 1998 | Kitt Peak | Spacewatch | · | 580 m | MPC · JPL |
| 285255 | 1998 HQ_{2} | — | April 20, 1998 | Kitt Peak | Spacewatch | EOS | 2.7 km | MPC · JPL |
| 285256 | 1998 HY_{9} | — | April 19, 1998 | Kitt Peak | Spacewatch | · | 1.4 km | MPC · JPL |
| 285257 | 1998 HD_{15} | — | April 18, 1998 | Kitt Peak | Spacewatch | · | 870 m | MPC · JPL |
| 285258 | 1998 HZ_{97} | — | April 21, 1998 | Socorro | LINEAR | · | 1.7 km | MPC · JPL |
| 285259 | 1998 HL_{110} | — | April 23, 1998 | Socorro | LINEAR | · | 4.9 km | MPC · JPL |
| 285260 | 1998 KY_{42} | — | May 28, 1998 | Kitt Peak | Spacewatch | T_{j} (2.99) · EUP | 6.8 km | MPC · JPL |
| 285261 | 1998 MR_{4} | — | June 18, 1998 | Kitt Peak | Spacewatch | · | 4.5 km | MPC · JPL |
| 285262 | 1998 MQ_{36} | — | June 27, 1998 | Kitt Peak | Spacewatch | EUN | 1.3 km | MPC · JPL |
| 285263 | 1998 QE_{2} | — | August 19, 1998 | Socorro | LINEAR | AMO +1km · PHA · moon | 1.2 km | MPC · JPL |
| 285264 | 1998 QF_{5} | — | August 22, 1998 | Xinglong | SCAP | · | 1.3 km | MPC · JPL |
| 285265 | 1998 QS_{15} | — | August 24, 1998 | Socorro | LINEAR | · | 710 m | MPC · JPL |
| 285266 | 1998 QA_{16} | — | August 23, 1998 | Anderson Mesa | LONEOS | H | 830 m | MPC · JPL |
| 285267 | 1998 QD_{27} | — | August 24, 1998 | Socorro | LINEAR | TIN | 2.1 km | MPC · JPL |
| 285268 | 1998 QY_{57} | — | August 30, 1998 | Kitt Peak | Spacewatch | · | 3.4 km | MPC · JPL |
| 285269 | 1998 QK_{84} | — | August 24, 1998 | Socorro | LINEAR | · | 4.7 km | MPC · JPL |
| 285270 | 1998 QO_{97} | — | August 24, 1998 | Socorro | LINEAR | · | 1.8 km | MPC · JPL |
| 285271 | 1998 RW_{6} | — | September 12, 1998 | Kitt Peak | Spacewatch | · | 2.5 km | MPC · JPL |
| 285272 | 1998 RM_{11} | — | September 13, 1998 | Kitt Peak | Spacewatch | · | 3.3 km | MPC · JPL |
| 285273 | 1998 RE_{13} | — | September 14, 1998 | Kitt Peak | Spacewatch | VER | 3.7 km | MPC · JPL |
| 285274 | 1998 RD_{21} | — | September 14, 1998 | Kitt Peak | Spacewatch | · | 830 m | MPC · JPL |
| 285275 | 1998 RZ_{24} | — | September 14, 1998 | Socorro | LINEAR | JUN | 1.4 km | MPC · JPL |
| 285276 | 1998 RH_{54} | — | September 14, 1998 | Socorro | LINEAR | · | 2.0 km | MPC · JPL |
| 285277 | 1998 RL_{63} | — | September 14, 1998 | Socorro | LINEAR | JUN | 1.3 km | MPC · JPL |
| 285278 | 1998 SN_{5} | — | September 19, 1998 | Kitt Peak | Spacewatch | · | 1.9 km | MPC · JPL |
| 285279 | 1998 SD_{14} | — | September 17, 1998 | Anderson Mesa | LONEOS | JUN | 1.5 km | MPC · JPL |
| 285280 | 1998 SF_{28} | — | September 24, 1998 | Woomera | F. B. Zoltowski | · | 2.0 km | MPC · JPL |
| 285281 | 1998 SD_{33} | — | September 18, 1998 | Socorro | LINEAR | H | 640 m | MPC · JPL |
| 285282 | 1998 SG_{33} | — | September 19, 1998 | Socorro | LINEAR | H | 810 m | MPC · JPL |
| 285283 | 1998 SM_{36} | — | September 18, 1998 | Kitt Peak | Spacewatch | · | 730 m | MPC · JPL |
| 285284 | 1998 SV_{47} | — | September 26, 1998 | Kitt Peak | Spacewatch | · | 930 m | MPC · JPL |
| 285285 | 1998 SP_{63} | — | September 29, 1998 | Xinglong | SCAP | · | 1.1 km | MPC · JPL |
| 285286 | 1998 SP_{76} | — | September 19, 1998 | Socorro | LINEAR | · | 3.0 km | MPC · JPL |
| 285287 | 1998 ST_{78} | — | September 26, 1998 | Socorro | LINEAR | · | 880 m | MPC · JPL |
| 285288 | 1998 SO_{96} | — | September 26, 1998 | Socorro | LINEAR | MAS | 990 m | MPC · JPL |
| 285289 | 1998 SD_{113} | — | September 26, 1998 | Socorro | LINEAR | · | 1.0 km | MPC · JPL |
| 285290 | 1998 SS_{140} | — | September 23, 1998 | Socorro | LINEAR | · | 1.2 km | MPC · JPL |
| 285291 | 1998 SJ_{152} | — | September 26, 1998 | Socorro | LINEAR | · | 1.0 km | MPC · JPL |
| 285292 | 1998 SL_{157} | — | September 26, 1998 | Socorro | LINEAR | (5) | 1.2 km | MPC · JPL |
| 285293 | 1998 SX_{173} | — | September 19, 1998 | Apache Point | SDSS | · | 780 m | MPC · JPL |
| 285294 | 1998 SP_{176} | — | September 19, 1998 | Apache Point | SDSS | · | 750 m | MPC · JPL |
| 285295 | 1998 TY_{4} | — | October 13, 1998 | Kitt Peak | Spacewatch | · | 1.8 km | MPC · JPL |
| 285296 | 1998 TZ_{4} | — | October 13, 1998 | Kitt Peak | Spacewatch | EOS | 2.6 km | MPC · JPL |
| 285297 | 1998 TQ_{7} | — | October 13, 1998 | Kitt Peak | Spacewatch | · | 1.5 km | MPC · JPL |
| 285298 | 1998 TR_{12} | — | October 13, 1998 | Kitt Peak | Spacewatch | fast | 1.7 km | MPC · JPL |
| 285299 | 1998 TJ_{16} | — | October 14, 1998 | Višnjan | K. Korlević | (1547) | 3.2 km | MPC · JPL |
| 285300 | 1998 TT_{16} | — | October 14, 1998 | Caussols | ODAS | · | 2.3 km | MPC · JPL |

== 285301–285400 ==
back to top

| Designation | | | Discovery | | | Properties | | Ref |
| Permanent | Provisional | Named after | Date | Site | Discoverer(s) | Category | Diam. | Ref |
|---|---|---|---|---|---|---|---|---|
| 285301 | 1998 TU_{19} | — | October 12, 1998 | Kitt Peak | Spacewatch | · | 1.9 km | MPC · JPL |
| 285302 | 1998 UD_{12} | — | October 17, 1998 | Kitt Peak | Spacewatch | · | 860 m | MPC · JPL |
| 285303 | 1998 UD_{46} | — | October 24, 1998 | Kitt Peak | Spacewatch | · | 3.0 km | MPC · JPL |
| 285304 | 1998 VR_{3} | — | November 10, 1998 | Caussols | ODAS | · | 740 m | MPC · JPL |
| 285305 | 1998 VN_{46} | — | November 14, 1998 | Kitt Peak | Spacewatch | · | 650 m | MPC · JPL |
| 285306 | 1998 VQ_{46} | — | November 14, 1998 | Kitt Peak | Spacewatch | · | 610 m | MPC · JPL |
| 285307 | 1998 WX_{36} | — | November 21, 1998 | Kitt Peak | Spacewatch | · | 2.1 km | MPC · JPL |
| 285308 | 1998 WV_{38} | — | November 21, 1998 | Kitt Peak | Spacewatch | MAS | 860 m | MPC · JPL |
| 285309 | 1998 WZ_{38} | — | November 21, 1998 | Kitt Peak | Spacewatch | · | 1.6 km | MPC · JPL |
| 285310 | 1998 XH_{4} | — | December 8, 1998 | Kitt Peak | Spacewatch | · | 810 m | MPC · JPL |
| 285311 | 1998 XV_{6} | — | December 8, 1998 | Kitt Peak | Spacewatch | · | 830 m | MPC · JPL |
| 285312 | 1998 XQ_{15} | — | December 15, 1998 | Caussols | ODAS | · | 1.2 km | MPC · JPL |
| 285313 | 1998 XH_{18} | — | December 8, 1998 | Kitt Peak | Spacewatch | · | 4.1 km | MPC · JPL |
| 285314 | 1998 XT_{20} | — | December 10, 1998 | Kitt Peak | Spacewatch | · | 1.9 km | MPC · JPL |
| 285315 | 1998 YZ_{12} | — | December 16, 1998 | Kitt Peak | Spacewatch | · | 1.6 km | MPC · JPL |
| 285316 | 1998 YE_{17} | — | December 22, 1998 | Kitt Peak | Spacewatch | · | 1.1 km | MPC · JPL |
| 285317 | 1998 YR_{21} | — | December 26, 1998 | Kitt Peak | Spacewatch | · | 2.0 km | MPC · JPL |
| 285318 | 1999 BG_{30} | — | January 19, 1999 | Kitt Peak | Spacewatch | · | 2.1 km | MPC · JPL |
| 285319 | 1999 BD_{31} | — | January 19, 1999 | Kitt Peak | Spacewatch | CYB | 4.7 km | MPC · JPL |
| 285320 | 1999 CS_{10} | — | February 12, 1999 | Socorro | LINEAR | · | 3.1 km | MPC · JPL |
| 285321 | 1999 CT_{57} | — | February 10, 1999 | Socorro | LINEAR | · | 3.3 km | MPC · JPL |
| 285322 | 1999 CW_{134} | — | February 7, 1999 | Kitt Peak | Spacewatch | · | 1.4 km | MPC · JPL |
| 285323 | 1999 CY_{140} | — | February 9, 1999 | Kitt Peak | Spacewatch | · | 1.5 km | MPC · JPL |
| 285324 | 1999 CM_{147} | — | February 9, 1999 | Kitt Peak | Spacewatch | HYG | 2.5 km | MPC · JPL |
| 285325 | 1999 EH_{8} | — | March 13, 1999 | Kitt Peak | Spacewatch | · | 990 m | MPC · JPL |
| 285326 | 1999 EU_{10} | — | March 14, 1999 | Kitt Peak | Spacewatch | · | 3.1 km | MPC · JPL |
| 285327 | 1999 EL_{13} | — | March 10, 1999 | Kitt Peak | Spacewatch | · | 770 m | MPC · JPL |
| 285328 | 1999 FC_{3} | — | March 17, 1999 | Kitt Peak | Spacewatch | · | 2.7 km | MPC · JPL |
| 285329 | 1999 FG_{17} | — | March 23, 1999 | Kitt Peak | Spacewatch | THM | 2.6 km | MPC · JPL |
| 285330 | 1999 FH_{17} | — | March 23, 1999 | Kitt Peak | Spacewatch | · | 670 m | MPC · JPL |
| 285331 | 1999 FN_{53} | — | March 31, 1999 | Anderson Mesa | LONEOS | APO +1km | 650 m | MPC · JPL |
| 285332 | 1999 FW_{74} | — | March 20, 1999 | Apache Point | SDSS | NEM | 2.2 km | MPC · JPL |
| 285333 | 1999 FZ_{74} | — | March 20, 1999 | Apache Point | SDSS | · | 1.6 km | MPC · JPL |
| 285334 | 1999 FO_{75} | — | March 20, 1999 | Apache Point | SDSS | JUN | 1.3 km | MPC · JPL |
| 285335 | 1999 FV_{87} | — | March 21, 1999 | Apache Point | SDSS | MAS | 820 m | MPC · JPL |
| 285336 | 1999 FO_{95} | — | March 21, 1999 | Apache Point | SDSS | · | 3.7 km | MPC · JPL |
| 285337 | 1999 GZ_{56} | — | April 9, 1999 | Kitt Peak | Spacewatch | · | 3.5 km | MPC · JPL |
| 285338 | 1999 JK_{5} | — | May 10, 1999 | Socorro | LINEAR | PHO | 1.6 km | MPC · JPL |
| 285339 | 1999 JR_{6} | — | May 10, 1999 | Socorro | LINEAR | APO +1km | 610 m | MPC · JPL |
| 285340 | 1999 LO_{6} | — | June 6, 1999 | Kitt Peak | Spacewatch | · | 3.7 km | MPC · JPL |
| 285341 | 1999 LB_{19} | — | June 9, 1999 | Socorro | LINEAR | · | 4.0 km | MPC · JPL |
| 285342 | 1999 RJ_{5} | — | September 3, 1999 | Kitt Peak | Spacewatch | MAS | 690 m | MPC · JPL |
| 285343 | 1999 RR_{5} | — | September 3, 1999 | Kitt Peak | Spacewatch | EOS | 2.6 km | MPC · JPL |
| 285344 | 1999 RE_{15} | — | September 7, 1999 | Socorro | LINEAR | · | 2.8 km | MPC · JPL |
| 285345 | 1999 RM_{29} | — | September 8, 1999 | Socorro | LINEAR | PHO | 2.3 km | MPC · JPL |
| 285346 | 1999 RA_{65} | — | September 7, 1999 | Socorro | LINEAR | · | 1.6 km | MPC · JPL |
| 285347 | 1999 RB_{70} | — | September 7, 1999 | Socorro | LINEAR | MAS | 840 m | MPC · JPL |
| 285348 | 1999 RL_{79} | — | September 7, 1999 | Socorro | LINEAR | · | 1.4 km | MPC · JPL |
| 285349 | 1999 RS_{99} | — | September 8, 1999 | Socorro | LINEAR | · | 2.9 km | MPC · JPL |
| 285350 | 1999 RP_{126} | — | September 9, 1999 | Socorro | LINEAR | · | 5.4 km | MPC · JPL |
| 285351 | 1999 RJ_{133} | — | September 13, 1999 | Kitt Peak | Spacewatch | · | 1.7 km | MPC · JPL |
| 285352 | 1999 RP_{149} | — | September 9, 1999 | Socorro | LINEAR | (5) | 2.4 km | MPC · JPL |
| 285353 | 1999 RB_{176} | — | September 9, 1999 | Socorro | LINEAR | ADE | 4.0 km | MPC · JPL |
| 285354 | 1999 RU_{187} | — | September 9, 1999 | Socorro | LINEAR | · | 3.2 km | MPC · JPL |
| 285355 | 1999 RF_{212} | — | September 8, 1999 | Socorro | LINEAR | · | 3.1 km | MPC · JPL |
| 285356 | 1999 RS_{233} | — | September 8, 1999 | Catalina | CSS | · | 1.3 km | MPC · JPL |
| 285357 | 1999 RX_{239} | — | September 9, 1999 | Socorro | LINEAR | · | 2.0 km | MPC · JPL |
| 285358 | 1999 RK_{255} | — | September 7, 1999 | Catalina | CSS | · | 1.6 km | MPC · JPL |
| 285359 | 1999 TL_{24} | — | October 4, 1999 | Kitt Peak | Spacewatch | NYS | 1.3 km | MPC · JPL |
| 285360 | 1999 TX_{33} | — | October 4, 1999 | Socorro | LINEAR | · | 840 m | MPC · JPL |
| 285361 | 1999 TC_{44} | — | October 3, 1999 | Kitt Peak | Spacewatch | · | 1.5 km | MPC · JPL |
| 285362 | 1999 TR_{53} | — | October 6, 1999 | Kitt Peak | Spacewatch | · | 1.1 km | MPC · JPL |
| 285363 | 1999 TU_{55} | — | October 6, 1999 | Kitt Peak | Spacewatch | · | 2.0 km | MPC · JPL |
| 285364 | 1999 TX_{61} | — | October 7, 1999 | Kitt Peak | Spacewatch | · | 730 m | MPC · JPL |
| 285365 | 1999 TR_{64} | — | October 8, 1999 | Kitt Peak | Spacewatch | · | 1.3 km | MPC · JPL |
| 285366 | 1999 TQ_{66} | — | October 8, 1999 | Kitt Peak | Spacewatch | NYS | 910 m | MPC · JPL |
| 285367 | 1999 TY_{67} | — | October 8, 1999 | Kitt Peak | Spacewatch | T_{j} (2.99) · 3:2 | 5.4 km | MPC · JPL |
| 285368 | 1999 TW_{70} | — | October 9, 1999 | Kitt Peak | Spacewatch | · | 1.0 km | MPC · JPL |
| 285369 | 1999 TE_{76} | — | October 10, 1999 | Kitt Peak | Spacewatch | · | 1.6 km | MPC · JPL |
| 285370 | 1999 TO_{78} | — | October 11, 1999 | Kitt Peak | Spacewatch | · | 2.2 km | MPC · JPL |
| 285371 | 1999 TH_{86} | — | October 14, 1999 | Kitt Peak | Spacewatch | MAS | 920 m | MPC · JPL |
| 285372 | 1999 TH_{91} | — | October 2, 1999 | Socorro | LINEAR | · | 920 m | MPC · JPL |
| 285373 | 1999 TE_{92} | — | October 2, 1999 | Socorro | LINEAR | · | 1.2 km | MPC · JPL |
| 285374 | 1999 TY_{94} | — | October 2, 1999 | Socorro | LINEAR | V | 940 m | MPC · JPL |
| 285375 | 1999 TM_{122} | — | October 4, 1999 | Socorro | LINEAR | · | 1.8 km | MPC · JPL |
| 285376 | 1999 TB_{125} | — | October 4, 1999 | Socorro | LINEAR | NYS | 1.3 km | MPC · JPL |
| 285377 | 1999 TP_{130} | — | October 6, 1999 | Socorro | LINEAR | · | 4.4 km | MPC · JPL |
| 285378 | 1999 TK_{134} | — | October 6, 1999 | Socorro | LINEAR | · | 2.8 km | MPC · JPL |
| 285379 | 1999 TR_{136} | — | October 6, 1999 | Socorro | LINEAR | · | 3.1 km | MPC · JPL |
| 285380 | 1999 TQ_{139} | — | October 6, 1999 | Socorro | LINEAR | · | 1.5 km | MPC · JPL |
| 285381 | 1999 TK_{143} | — | October 7, 1999 | Socorro | LINEAR | NYS | 1.6 km | MPC · JPL |
| 285382 | 1999 TA_{149} | — | October 7, 1999 | Socorro | LINEAR | · | 2.1 km | MPC · JPL |
| 285383 | 1999 TX_{157} | — | October 9, 1999 | Socorro | LINEAR | · | 1.0 km | MPC · JPL |
| 285384 | 1999 TG_{161} | — | October 9, 1999 | Socorro | LINEAR | · | 3.2 km | MPC · JPL |
| 285385 | 1999 TS_{176} | — | October 10, 1999 | Socorro | LINEAR | · | 970 m | MPC · JPL |
| 285386 | 1999 TT_{177} | — | October 10, 1999 | Socorro | LINEAR | · | 2.7 km | MPC · JPL |
| 285387 | 1999 TX_{183} | — | October 12, 1999 | Socorro | LINEAR | TIR | 2.6 km | MPC · JPL |
| 285388 | 1999 TN_{185} | — | October 12, 1999 | Socorro | LINEAR | · | 1.5 km | MPC · JPL |
| 285389 | 1999 TS_{196} | — | October 12, 1999 | Socorro | LINEAR | · | 2.0 km | MPC · JPL |
| 285390 | 1999 TG_{211} | — | October 15, 1999 | Socorro | LINEAR | · | 1.0 km | MPC · JPL |
| 285391 | 1999 TM_{212} | — | October 15, 1999 | Socorro | LINEAR | · | 3.1 km | MPC · JPL |
| 285392 | 1999 TH_{219} | — | October 1, 1999 | Catalina | CSS | · | 1.3 km | MPC · JPL |
| 285393 | 1999 TJ_{220} | — | October 12, 1999 | Socorro | LINEAR | (5) | 1.6 km | MPC · JPL |
| 285394 | 1999 TK_{225} | — | October 2, 1999 | Kitt Peak | Spacewatch | · | 1.7 km | MPC · JPL |
| 285395 | 1999 TE_{254} | — | October 11, 1999 | Kitt Peak | Spacewatch | · | 1.6 km | MPC · JPL |
| 285396 | 1999 TW_{263} | — | October 15, 1999 | Kitt Peak | Spacewatch | · | 4.2 km | MPC · JPL |
| 285397 | 1999 TR_{266} | — | October 3, 1999 | Socorro | LINEAR | TIR | 3.9 km | MPC · JPL |
| 285398 | 1999 TN_{278} | — | October 6, 1999 | Socorro | LINEAR | · | 4.1 km | MPC · JPL |
| 285399 | 1999 TY_{289} | — | October 10, 1999 | Socorro | LINEAR | · | 3.7 km | MPC · JPL |
| 285400 | 1999 TY_{293} | — | October 1, 1999 | Kitt Peak | Spacewatch | NYS | 1.1 km | MPC · JPL |

== 285401–285500 ==
back to top

| Designation | | | Discovery | | | Properties | | Ref |
| Permanent | Provisional | Named after | Date | Site | Discoverer(s) | Category | Diam. | Ref |
|---|---|---|---|---|---|---|---|---|
| 285401 | 1999 TN_{294} | — | October 1, 1999 | Kitt Peak | Spacewatch | · | 1.6 km | MPC · JPL |
| 285402 | 1999 TO_{309} | — | October 6, 1999 | Socorro | LINEAR | HYG | 3.4 km | MPC · JPL |
| 285403 | 1999 TT_{319} | — | October 9, 1999 | Kitt Peak | Spacewatch | · | 1.0 km | MPC · JPL |
| 285404 | 1999 TU_{321} | — | October 12, 1999 | Kitt Peak | Spacewatch | · | 1.6 km | MPC · JPL |
| 285405 | 1999 UZ_{3} | — | October 26, 1999 | Gnosca | S. Sposetti | · | 4.4 km | MPC · JPL |
| 285406 | 1999 UV_{20} | — | October 31, 1999 | Kitt Peak | Spacewatch | · | 1.4 km | MPC · JPL |
| 285407 | 1999 US_{28} | — | October 31, 1999 | Kitt Peak | Spacewatch | · | 1.3 km | MPC · JPL |
| 285408 | 1999 UT_{28} | — | October 31, 1999 | Kitt Peak | Spacewatch | · | 2.8 km | MPC · JPL |
| 285409 | 1999 UF_{32} | — | October 31, 1999 | Kitt Peak | Spacewatch | · | 1.4 km | MPC · JPL |
| 285410 | 1999 US_{39} | — | October 31, 1999 | Kitt Peak | Spacewatch | · | 2.6 km | MPC · JPL |
| 285411 | 1999 VW_{2} | — | November 4, 1999 | Bergisch Gladbach | W. Bickel | · | 1.0 km | MPC · JPL |
| 285412 | 1999 VD_{3} | — | November 1, 1999 | Kitt Peak | Spacewatch | · | 3.5 km | MPC · JPL |
| 285413 | 1999 VC_{17} | — | November 2, 1999 | Kitt Peak | Spacewatch | NYS | 1.1 km | MPC · JPL |
| 285414 | 1999 VK_{39} | — | November 10, 1999 | Socorro | LINEAR | (5) | 1.6 km | MPC · JPL |
| 285415 | 1999 VQ_{42} | — | November 4, 1999 | Kitt Peak | Spacewatch | NYS | 1.4 km | MPC · JPL |
| 285416 | 1999 VX_{42} | — | November 4, 1999 | Kitt Peak | Spacewatch | THM | 2.4 km | MPC · JPL |
| 285417 | 1999 VH_{46} | — | November 3, 1999 | Socorro | LINEAR | · | 2.9 km | MPC · JPL |
| 285418 | 1999 VM_{46} | — | November 3, 1999 | Socorro | LINEAR | · | 700 m | MPC · JPL |
| 285419 | 1999 VE_{73} | — | November 1, 1999 | Kitt Peak | Spacewatch | · | 1.3 km | MPC · JPL |
| 285420 | 1999 VR_{74} | — | November 5, 1999 | Kitt Peak | Spacewatch | · | 4.2 km | MPC · JPL |
| 285421 | 1999 VT_{76} | — | November 5, 1999 | Kitt Peak | Spacewatch | · | 2.9 km | MPC · JPL |
| 285422 | 1999 VJ_{96} | — | November 9, 1999 | Socorro | LINEAR | V | 630 m | MPC · JPL |
| 285423 | 1999 VM_{100} | — | November 9, 1999 | Socorro | LINEAR | · | 3.6 km | MPC · JPL |
| 285424 | 1999 VO_{101} | — | November 9, 1999 | Socorro | LINEAR | · | 3.9 km | MPC · JPL |
| 285425 | 1999 VY_{102} | — | November 9, 1999 | Socorro | LINEAR | EOS | 2.3 km | MPC · JPL |
| 285426 | 1999 VK_{103} | — | November 9, 1999 | Socorro | LINEAR | · | 3.0 km | MPC · JPL |
| 285427 | 1999 VL_{103} | — | November 9, 1999 | Socorro | LINEAR | MAS | 990 m | MPC · JPL |
| 285428 | 1999 VX_{112} | — | November 9, 1999 | Socorro | LINEAR | · | 2.4 km | MPC · JPL |
| 285429 | 1999 VM_{123} | — | November 5, 1999 | Kitt Peak | Spacewatch | · | 1.3 km | MPC · JPL |
| 285430 | 1999 VU_{123} | — | November 5, 1999 | Kitt Peak | Spacewatch | MAS | 610 m | MPC · JPL |
| 285431 | 1999 VS_{125} | — | October 29, 1999 | Kitt Peak | Spacewatch | · | 2.8 km | MPC · JPL |
| 285432 | 1999 VV_{126} | — | November 9, 1999 | Kitt Peak | Spacewatch | · | 960 m | MPC · JPL |
| 285433 | 1999 VD_{127} | — | November 9, 1999 | Kitt Peak | Spacewatch | · | 2.0 km | MPC · JPL |
| 285434 | 1999 VZ_{130} | — | November 9, 1999 | Kitt Peak | Spacewatch | · | 640 m | MPC · JPL |
| 285435 | 1999 VL_{141} | — | November 10, 1999 | Kitt Peak | Spacewatch | · | 1.6 km | MPC · JPL |
| 285436 | 1999 VR_{146} | — | November 12, 1999 | Socorro | LINEAR | · | 1.7 km | MPC · JPL |
| 285437 | 1999 VJ_{148} | — | November 14, 1999 | Socorro | LINEAR | · | 1.8 km | MPC · JPL |
| 285438 | 1999 VP_{151} | — | November 14, 1999 | Socorro | LINEAR | · | 2.4 km | MPC · JPL |
| 285439 | 1999 VC_{155} | — | November 13, 1999 | Kitt Peak | Spacewatch | · | 3.5 km | MPC · JPL |
| 285440 | 1999 VE_{167} | — | November 14, 1999 | Socorro | LINEAR | (5) | 1.2 km | MPC · JPL |
| 285441 | 1999 VT_{183} | — | November 12, 1999 | Socorro | LINEAR | · | 2.4 km | MPC · JPL |
| 285442 | 1999 VJ_{185} | — | November 15, 1999 | Socorro | LINEAR | NAE | 3.7 km | MPC · JPL |
| 285443 | 1999 VM_{185} | — | November 15, 1999 | Socorro | LINEAR | · | 710 m | MPC · JPL |
| 285444 | 1999 VP_{202} | — | November 5, 1999 | Kitt Peak | Spacewatch | · | 1.2 km | MPC · JPL |
| 285445 | 1999 VS_{204} | — | November 10, 1999 | Kitt Peak | Spacewatch | AEO | 1.4 km | MPC · JPL |
| 285446 | 1999 VD_{212} | — | November 12, 1999 | Socorro | LINEAR | · | 2.9 km | MPC · JPL |
| 285447 | 1999 VE_{222} | — | November 4, 1999 | Kitt Peak | Spacewatch | · | 2.9 km | MPC · JPL |
| 285448 | 1999 WK_{19} | — | November 30, 1999 | Kitt Peak | Spacewatch | · | 2.5 km | MPC · JPL |
| 285449 | 1999 XO_{9} | — | December 2, 1999 | Kitt Peak | Spacewatch | ADE | 2.3 km | MPC · JPL |
| 285450 | 1999 XJ_{62} | — | December 7, 1999 | Socorro | LINEAR | V | 850 m | MPC · JPL |
| 285451 | 1999 XK_{111} | — | December 8, 1999 | Catalina | CSS | BAR | 1.5 km | MPC · JPL |
| 285452 | 1999 XC_{137} | — | December 5, 1999 | Anderson Mesa | LONEOS | · | 2.1 km | MPC · JPL |
| 285453 | 1999 XK_{138} | — | December 3, 1999 | Kitt Peak | Spacewatch | · | 1.8 km | MPC · JPL |
| 285454 | 1999 XD_{210} | — | December 13, 1999 | Socorro | LINEAR | · | 2.5 km | MPC · JPL |
| 285455 | 1999 XK_{210} | — | December 13, 1999 | Socorro | LINEAR | · | 2.8 km | MPC · JPL |
| 285456 | 1999 XL_{232} | — | December 7, 1999 | Kitt Peak | Spacewatch | · | 1.3 km | MPC · JPL |
| 285457 | 1999 XO_{235} | — | December 2, 1999 | Kitt Peak | Spacewatch | · | 960 m | MPC · JPL |
| 285458 | 1999 XQ_{246} | — | December 5, 1999 | Kitt Peak | Spacewatch | · | 1.1 km | MPC · JPL |
| 285459 | 1999 XB_{252} | — | December 9, 1999 | Kitt Peak | Spacewatch | · | 3.4 km | MPC · JPL |
| 285460 | 1999 XQ_{254} | — | December 12, 1999 | Kitt Peak | Spacewatch | · | 2.7 km | MPC · JPL |
| 285461 | 1999 XY_{259} | — | December 7, 1999 | Kitt Peak | Spacewatch | · | 2.1 km | MPC · JPL |
| 285462 | 1999 YX_{1} | — | December 16, 1999 | Kitt Peak | Spacewatch | · | 4.6 km | MPC · JPL |
| 285463 | 1999 YQ_{7} | — | December 27, 1999 | Kitt Peak | Spacewatch | · | 2.2 km | MPC · JPL |
| 285464 | 1999 YD_{10} | — | December 27, 1999 | Kitt Peak | Spacewatch | NYS | 1.1 km | MPC · JPL |
| 285465 | 1999 YF_{11} | — | December 27, 1999 | Kitt Peak | Spacewatch | (5) | 1.6 km | MPC · JPL |
| 285466 | 1999 YL_{23} | — | December 16, 1999 | Kitt Peak | Spacewatch | MAS | 740 m | MPC · JPL |
| 285467 | 1999 YX_{23} | — | December 16, 1999 | Kitt Peak | Spacewatch | MIS | 2.2 km | MPC · JPL |
| 285468 | 1999 YE_{24} | — | December 16, 1999 | Kitt Peak | Spacewatch | · | 4.1 km | MPC · JPL |
| 285469 | 2000 AV_{37} | — | January 3, 2000 | Socorro | LINEAR | · | 2.3 km | MPC · JPL |
| 285470 | 2000 AH_{197} | — | January 8, 2000 | Socorro | LINEAR | · | 3.4 km | MPC · JPL |
| 285471 | 2000 AT_{207} | — | January 3, 2000 | Kitt Peak | Spacewatch | PHO | 1.1 km | MPC · JPL |
| 285472 | 2000 AD_{208} | — | January 4, 2000 | Kitt Peak | Spacewatch | · | 4.4 km | MPC · JPL |
| 285473 | 2000 AR_{212} | — | January 6, 2000 | Kitt Peak | Spacewatch | · | 2.9 km | MPC · JPL |
| 285474 | 2000 AU_{218} | — | January 8, 2000 | Kitt Peak | Spacewatch | THM | 2.0 km | MPC · JPL |
| 285475 | 2000 AE_{221} | — | January 8, 2000 | Kitt Peak | Spacewatch | · | 2.2 km | MPC · JPL |
| 285476 | 2000 AV_{248} | — | January 2, 2000 | Kitt Peak | Spacewatch | (5) | 1.7 km | MPC · JPL |
| 285477 | 2000 BH_{10} | — | January 26, 2000 | Kitt Peak | Spacewatch | AGN | 1.5 km | MPC · JPL |
| 285478 | 2000 BM_{13} | — | January 29, 2000 | Kitt Peak | Spacewatch | NYS | 1.1 km | MPC · JPL |
| 285479 | 2000 BH_{22} | — | January 30, 2000 | Kitt Peak | Spacewatch | · | 1.6 km | MPC · JPL |
| 285480 | 2000 BZ_{23} | — | January 29, 2000 | Socorro | LINEAR | · | 3.9 km | MPC · JPL |
| 285481 | 2000 BT_{42} | — | January 27, 2000 | Kitt Peak | Spacewatch | · | 1.3 km | MPC · JPL |
| 285482 | 2000 BG_{49} | — | January 27, 2000 | Kitt Peak | Spacewatch | · | 3.6 km | MPC · JPL |
| 285483 | 2000 BW_{50} | — | January 16, 2000 | Kitt Peak | Spacewatch | · | 2.1 km | MPC · JPL |
| 285484 | 2000 CS_{12} | — | February 2, 2000 | Socorro | LINEAR | · | 3.3 km | MPC · JPL |
| 285485 | 2000 CN_{64} | — | February 3, 2000 | Socorro | LINEAR | · | 1.5 km | MPC · JPL |
| 285486 | 2000 CY_{71} | — | February 7, 2000 | Kitt Peak | Spacewatch | · | 940 m | MPC · JPL |
| 285487 | 2000 CH_{74} | — | January 30, 2000 | Kitt Peak | Spacewatch | · | 1.3 km | MPC · JPL |
| 285488 | 2000 CR_{74} | — | February 8, 2000 | Kitt Peak | Spacewatch | (5) | 1.4 km | MPC · JPL |
| 285489 | 2000 CL_{99} | — | February 8, 2000 | Kitt Peak | Spacewatch | PAD | 2.0 km | MPC · JPL |
| 285490 | 2000 CU_{100} | — | February 10, 2000 | Kitt Peak | Spacewatch | EOS | 3.0 km | MPC · JPL |
| 285491 | 2000 CK_{114} | — | February 12, 2000 | Kitt Peak | Spacewatch | · | 4.0 km | MPC · JPL |
| 285492 | 2000 CL_{134} | — | February 4, 2000 | Kitt Peak | Spacewatch | · | 1.5 km | MPC · JPL |
| 285493 | 2000 CD_{135} | — | February 4, 2000 | Kitt Peak | Spacewatch | · | 1.6 km | MPC · JPL |
| 285494 | 2000 CM_{139} | — | February 3, 2000 | Kitt Peak | Spacewatch | · | 750 m | MPC · JPL |
| 285495 | 2000 CX_{149} | — | February 3, 2000 | Kitt Peak | Spacewatch | · | 3.6 km | MPC · JPL |
| 285496 | 2000 DZ_{9} | — | February 26, 2000 | Kitt Peak | Spacewatch | · | 1.1 km | MPC · JPL |
| 285497 | 2000 DN_{11} | — | February 27, 2000 | Kitt Peak | Spacewatch | AGN | 1.6 km | MPC · JPL |
| 285498 | 2000 DU_{20} | — | February 29, 2000 | Socorro | LINEAR | · | 1.7 km | MPC · JPL |
| 285499 | 2000 DF_{38} | — | February 29, 2000 | Socorro | LINEAR | · | 2.6 km | MPC · JPL |
| 285500 | 2000 DR_{39} | — | February 29, 2000 | Socorro | LINEAR | · | 1.7 km | MPC · JPL |

== 285501–285600 ==
back to top

| Designation | | | Discovery | | | Properties | | Ref |
| Permanent | Provisional | Named after | Date | Site | Discoverer(s) | Category | Diam. | Ref |
|---|---|---|---|---|---|---|---|---|
| 285501 | 2000 DM_{40} | — | February 29, 2000 | Socorro | LINEAR | · | 2.7 km | MPC · JPL |
| 285502 | 2000 DU_{42} | — | February 29, 2000 | Socorro | LINEAR | · | 2.8 km | MPC · JPL |
| 285503 | 2000 DV_{46} | — | February 29, 2000 | Socorro | LINEAR | · | 2.1 km | MPC · JPL |
| 285504 | 2000 DH_{49} | — | February 29, 2000 | Socorro | LINEAR | · | 3.1 km | MPC · JPL |
| 285505 | 2000 DS_{57} | — | February 29, 2000 | Socorro | LINEAR | · | 2.3 km | MPC · JPL |
| 285506 | 2000 EZ_{15} | — | March 3, 2000 | Kitt Peak | Spacewatch | · | 1.2 km | MPC · JPL |
| 285507 | 2000 EL_{23} | — | March 4, 2000 | Kitt Peak | Spacewatch | THM | 2.6 km | MPC · JPL |
| 285508 | 2000 EF_{33} | — | March 5, 2000 | Socorro | LINEAR | · | 980 m | MPC · JPL |
| 285509 | 2000 EK_{36} | — | March 5, 2000 | Socorro | LINEAR | · | 3.1 km | MPC · JPL |
| 285510 | 2000 EG_{51} | — | March 3, 2000 | Kitt Peak | Spacewatch | · | 2.2 km | MPC · JPL |
| 285511 | 2000 EJ_{52} | — | March 3, 2000 | Kitt Peak | Spacewatch | · | 1.0 km | MPC · JPL |
| 285512 | 2000 ER_{72} | — | March 10, 2000 | Kitt Peak | Spacewatch | · | 850 m | MPC · JPL |
| 285513 | 2000 EZ_{99} | — | March 12, 2000 | Kitt Peak | Spacewatch | · | 1.7 km | MPC · JPL |
| 285514 | 2000 EJ_{101} | — | March 9, 2000 | Kitt Peak | Spacewatch | · | 1.4 km | MPC · JPL |
| 285515 | 2000 ET_{114} | — | March 10, 2000 | Kitt Peak | Spacewatch | · | 1.3 km | MPC · JPL |
| 285516 | 2000 EU_{146} | — | March 4, 2000 | Socorro | LINEAR | · | 3.1 km | MPC · JPL |
| 285517 | 2000 EO_{152} | — | March 6, 2000 | Haleakala | NEAT | · | 840 m | MPC · JPL |
| 285518 | 2000 EE_{186} | — | March 2, 2000 | Kitt Peak | Spacewatch | · | 2.8 km | MPC · JPL |
| 285519 | 2000 EV_{196} | — | March 3, 2000 | Socorro | LINEAR | · | 2.1 km | MPC · JPL |
| 285520 | 2000 FO_{4} | — | March 27, 2000 | Kitt Peak | Spacewatch | AGN | 1.4 km | MPC · JPL |
| 285521 | 2000 FT_{5} | — | March 25, 2000 | Kitt Peak | Spacewatch | EOS | 2.1 km | MPC · JPL |
| 285522 | 2000 FW_{5} | — | March 25, 2000 | Kitt Peak | Spacewatch | · | 2.2 km | MPC · JPL |
| 285523 | 2000 FX_{9} | — | March 30, 2000 | Kitt Peak | Spacewatch | · | 1.8 km | MPC · JPL |
| 285524 | 2000 FQ_{22} | — | March 29, 2000 | Socorro | LINEAR | · | 3.2 km | MPC · JPL |
| 285525 | 2000 FQ_{24} | — | March 29, 2000 | Socorro | LINEAR | MAR | 1.5 km | MPC · JPL |
| 285526 | 2000 FX_{50} | — | March 29, 2000 | Kitt Peak | Spacewatch | HOF | 2.6 km | MPC · JPL |
| 285527 | 2000 FJ_{52} | — | March 29, 2000 | Kitt Peak | Spacewatch | CYB | 2.7 km | MPC · JPL |
| 285528 | 2000 FY_{71} | — | March 27, 2000 | Anderson Mesa | LONEOS | · | 2.5 km | MPC · JPL |
| 285529 | 2000 FO_{73} | — | March 25, 2000 | Kitt Peak | Spacewatch | · | 1.7 km | MPC · JPL |
| 285530 | 2000 GT_{15} | — | April 5, 2000 | Socorro | LINEAR | · | 710 m | MPC · JPL |
| 285531 | 2000 GS_{22} | — | April 5, 2000 | Socorro | LINEAR | · | 1.0 km | MPC · JPL |
| 285532 | 2000 GK_{25} | — | April 5, 2000 | Socorro | LINEAR | · | 1.3 km | MPC · JPL |
| 285533 | 2000 GR_{29} | — | April 5, 2000 | Socorro | LINEAR | · | 1.2 km | MPC · JPL |
| 285534 | 2000 GK_{36} | — | April 5, 2000 | Socorro | LINEAR | · | 1.2 km | MPC · JPL |
| 285535 | 2000 GU_{37} | — | April 5, 2000 | Socorro | LINEAR | · | 1.7 km | MPC · JPL |
| 285536 | 2000 GP_{73} | — | April 5, 2000 | Socorro | LINEAR | · | 2.5 km | MPC · JPL |
| 285537 | 2000 GW_{109} | — | April 2, 2000 | Anderson Mesa | LONEOS | · | 3.6 km | MPC · JPL |
| 285538 | 2000 GK_{111} | — | April 3, 2000 | Anderson Mesa | LONEOS | · | 1.6 km | MPC · JPL |
| 285539 | 2000 GY_{120} | — | April 5, 2000 | Kitt Peak | Spacewatch | · | 820 m | MPC · JPL |
| 285540 | 2000 GU_{127} | — | April 7, 2000 | Anderson Mesa | LONEOS | APO | 660 m | MPC · JPL |
| 285541 | 2000 GM_{132} | — | April 11, 2000 | Kitt Peak | Spacewatch | · | 1.5 km | MPC · JPL |
| 285542 | 2000 GM_{139} | — | April 4, 2000 | Anderson Mesa | LONEOS | · | 970 m | MPC · JPL |
| 285543 | 2000 GH_{170} | — | April 5, 2000 | Anderson Mesa | LONEOS | BRA | 2.2 km | MPC · JPL |
| 285544 | 2000 GG_{180} | — | April 5, 2000 | Socorro | LINEAR | · | 2.2 km | MPC · JPL |
| 285545 | 2000 GX_{180} | — | April 6, 2000 | Socorro | LINEAR | · | 1.7 km | MPC · JPL |
| 285546 | 2000 HJ_{20} | — | April 29, 2000 | Kitt Peak | Spacewatch | H | 730 m | MPC · JPL |
| 285547 | 2000 HL_{32} | — | April 29, 2000 | Socorro | LINEAR | · | 840 m | MPC · JPL |
| 285548 | 2000 HQ_{66} | — | April 26, 2000 | Kitt Peak | Spacewatch | · | 1.1 km | MPC · JPL |
| 285549 | 2000 JA_{5} | — | May 3, 2000 | Kitt Peak | Spacewatch | · | 710 m | MPC · JPL |
| 285550 | 2000 JR_{7} | — | May 4, 2000 | Kitt Peak | Spacewatch | · | 3.0 km | MPC · JPL |
| 285551 | 2000 JJ_{68} | — | May 7, 2000 | Kitt Peak | Spacewatch | · | 710 m | MPC · JPL |
| 285552 | 2000 JS_{90} | — | May 4, 2000 | Apache Point | SDSS | 615 | 1.9 km | MPC · JPL |
| 285553 | 2000 KN_{1} | — | May 26, 2000 | Socorro | LINEAR | H | 990 m | MPC · JPL |
| 285554 | 2000 KN_{4} | — | May 27, 2000 | Socorro | LINEAR | · | 2.5 km | MPC · JPL |
| 285555 | 2000 KV_{39} | — | May 24, 2000 | Kitt Peak | Spacewatch | · | 4.1 km | MPC · JPL |
| 285556 | 2000 KV_{40} | — | May 30, 2000 | Kitt Peak | Spacewatch | · | 1.5 km | MPC · JPL |
| 285557 | 2000 KV_{44} | — | May 28, 2000 | Kitt Peak | Spacewatch | · | 2.1 km | MPC · JPL |
| 285558 | 2000 KR_{45} | — | May 30, 2000 | Kitt Peak | Spacewatch | · | 910 m | MPC · JPL |
| 285559 | 2000 KE_{51} | — | May 30, 2000 | Kitt Peak | Spacewatch | · | 2.3 km | MPC · JPL |
| 285560 | 2000 KO_{57} | — | May 24, 2000 | Kitt Peak | Spacewatch | · | 2.6 km | MPC · JPL |
| 285561 | 2000 KN_{63} | — | May 26, 2000 | Anderson Mesa | LONEOS | · | 1.9 km | MPC · JPL |
| 285562 | 2000 KC_{65} | — | May 27, 2000 | Socorro | LINEAR | DOR | 3.2 km | MPC · JPL |
| 285563 | 2000 KK_{66} | — | May 27, 2000 | Anderson Mesa | LONEOS | H | 790 m | MPC · JPL |
| 285564 | 2000 KJ_{70} | — | May 28, 2000 | Socorro | LINEAR | · | 2.7 km | MPC · JPL |
| 285565 | 2000 LX_{6} | — | June 1, 2000 | Kitt Peak | Spacewatch | · | 1.2 km | MPC · JPL |
| 285566 | 2000 NM_{10} | — | July 5, 2000 | Goodricke-Pigott | R. A. Tucker | · | 1.3 km | MPC · JPL |
| 285567 | 2000 OM | — | July 23, 2000 | Socorro | LINEAR | APO | 710 m | MPC · JPL |
| 285568 | 2000 OX_{8} | — | July 31, 2000 | Socorro | LINEAR | · | 3.9 km | MPC · JPL |
| 285569 | 2000 OC_{9} | — | July 31, 2000 | Socorro | LINEAR | · | 2.3 km | MPC · JPL |
| 285570 | 2000 OK_{32} | — | July 30, 2000 | Socorro | LINEAR | · | 2.5 km | MPC · JPL |
| 285571 | 2000 PQ_{9} | — | August 9, 2000 | Socorro | LINEAR | AMO | 660 m | MPC · JPL |
| 285572 | 2000 PU_{18} | — | August 1, 2000 | Socorro | LINEAR | · | 3.6 km | MPC · JPL |
| 285573 | 2000 QC_{16} | — | August 24, 2000 | Socorro | LINEAR | · | 800 m | MPC · JPL |
| 285574 | 2000 QG_{20} | — | August 24, 2000 | Socorro | LINEAR | · | 1.0 km | MPC · JPL |
| 285575 | 2000 QU_{20} | — | August 24, 2000 | Socorro | LINEAR | · | 1.4 km | MPC · JPL |
| 285576 | 2000 QQ_{37} | — | August 24, 2000 | Socorro | LINEAR | · | 3.4 km | MPC · JPL |
| 285577 | 2000 QZ_{38} | — | August 24, 2000 | Socorro | LINEAR | · | 1.7 km | MPC · JPL |
| 285578 | 2000 QA_{39} | — | August 24, 2000 | Socorro | LINEAR | · | 1.5 km | MPC · JPL |
| 285579 | 2000 QN_{39} | — | August 24, 2000 | Socorro | LINEAR | NYS | 1.3 km | MPC · JPL |
| 285580 | 2000 QV_{48} | — | August 24, 2000 | Socorro | LINEAR | · | 3.0 km | MPC · JPL |
| 285581 | 2000 QW_{51} | — | August 24, 2000 | Socorro | LINEAR | EMA | 5.4 km | MPC · JPL |
| 285582 | 2000 QY_{51} | — | August 24, 2000 | Socorro | LINEAR | EUP | 6.4 km | MPC · JPL |
| 285583 | 2000 QV_{59} | — | August 26, 2000 | Socorro | LINEAR | · | 1.3 km | MPC · JPL |
| 285584 | 2000 QN_{68} | — | August 26, 2000 | Prescott | P. G. Comba | HYG | 3.1 km | MPC · JPL |
| 285585 | 2000 QU_{70} | — | August 29, 2000 | Socorro | LINEAR | PHO | 1.3 km | MPC · JPL |
| 285586 | 2000 QB_{74} | — | August 24, 2000 | Socorro | LINEAR | · | 1.6 km | MPC · JPL |
| 285587 | 2000 QC_{76} | — | August 24, 2000 | Socorro | LINEAR | · | 760 m | MPC · JPL |
| 285588 | 2000 QW_{92} | — | August 25, 2000 | Socorro | LINEAR | · | 1.8 km | MPC · JPL |
| 285589 | 2000 QB_{94} | — | August 26, 2000 | Socorro | LINEAR | · | 790 m | MPC · JPL |
| 285590 | 2000 QX_{101} | — | August 28, 2000 | Socorro | LINEAR | V | 1.1 km | MPC · JPL |
| 285591 | 2000 QU_{105} | — | August 28, 2000 | Socorro | LINEAR | · | 1.8 km | MPC · JPL |
| 285592 | 2000 QY_{111} | — | August 24, 2000 | Socorro | LINEAR | NYS | 1.2 km | MPC · JPL |
| 285593 | 2000 QU_{113} | — | August 24, 2000 | Socorro | LINEAR | (5) | 1.4 km | MPC · JPL |
| 285594 | 2000 QC_{114} | — | August 24, 2000 | Socorro | LINEAR | · | 2.1 km | MPC · JPL |
| 285595 | 2000 QW_{124} | — | August 29, 2000 | Socorro | LINEAR | MAS | 880 m | MPC · JPL |
| 285596 | 2000 QM_{131} | — | August 24, 2000 | Socorro | LINEAR | · | 2.5 km | MPC · JPL |
| 285597 | 2000 QL_{136} | — | August 29, 2000 | Socorro | LINEAR | ERI | 1.7 km | MPC · JPL |
| 285598 | 2000 QH_{146} | — | August 31, 2000 | Socorro | LINEAR | · | 850 m | MPC · JPL |
| 285599 | 2000 QQ_{156} | — | August 31, 2000 | Socorro | LINEAR | · | 1.8 km | MPC · JPL |
| 285600 | 2000 QZ_{160} | — | August 31, 2000 | Socorro | LINEAR | · | 2.3 km | MPC · JPL |

== 285601–285700 ==
back to top

| Designation | | | Discovery | | | Properties | | Ref |
| Permanent | Provisional | Named after | Date | Site | Discoverer(s) | Category | Diam. | Ref |
|---|---|---|---|---|---|---|---|---|
| 285601 | 2000 QT_{161} | — | August 31, 2000 | Socorro | LINEAR | · | 2.5 km | MPC · JPL |
| 285602 | 2000 QG_{163} | — | August 31, 2000 | Socorro | LINEAR | · | 1.6 km | MPC · JPL |
| 285603 | 2000 QF_{165} | — | August 31, 2000 | Socorro | LINEAR | · | 3.4 km | MPC · JPL |
| 285604 | 2000 QC_{168} | — | August 31, 2000 | Socorro | LINEAR | · | 1.1 km | MPC · JPL |
| 285605 | 2000 QO_{174} | — | August 31, 2000 | Socorro | LINEAR | · | 3.4 km | MPC · JPL |
| 285606 | 2000 QD_{178} | — | August 31, 2000 | Socorro | LINEAR | · | 2.5 km | MPC · JPL |
| 285607 | 2000 QZ_{187} | — | August 26, 2000 | Socorro | LINEAR | · | 1.1 km | MPC · JPL |
| 285608 | 2000 QS_{204} | — | August 31, 2000 | Socorro | LINEAR | ERI | 2.4 km | MPC · JPL |
| 285609 | 2000 QE_{208} | — | August 31, 2000 | Socorro | LINEAR | · | 4.0 km | MPC · JPL |
| 285610 | 2000 QD_{213} | — | August 31, 2000 | Socorro | LINEAR | V | 940 m | MPC · JPL |
| 285611 | 2000 QP_{216} | — | August 31, 2000 | Socorro | LINEAR | · | 2.2 km | MPC · JPL |
| 285612 | 2000 QT_{216} | — | August 31, 2000 | Socorro | LINEAR | MAS | 1.0 km | MPC · JPL |
| 285613 | 2000 QC_{230} | — | August 31, 2000 | Socorro | LINEAR | · | 1.7 km | MPC · JPL |
| 285614 | 2000 QB_{231} | — | August 31, 2000 | Kvistaberg | Uppsala-DLR Asteroid Survey | (8737) | 3.8 km | MPC · JPL |
| 285615 | 2000 QB_{233} | — | August 25, 2000 | Cerro Tololo | M. W. Buie | (5) | 1.6 km | MPC · JPL |
| 285616 | 2000 QD_{247} | — | August 27, 2000 | Cerro Tololo | M. W. Buie | · | 690 m | MPC · JPL |
| 285617 | 2000 RC_{8} | — | September 1, 2000 | Bologna | San Vittore | BAR | 1.6 km | MPC · JPL |
| 285618 | 2000 RN_{8} | — | September 1, 2000 | Socorro | LINEAR | · | 1.2 km | MPC · JPL |
| 285619 | 2000 RA_{17} | — | September 1, 2000 | Socorro | LINEAR | · | 3.4 km | MPC · JPL |
| 285620 | 2000 RJ_{17} | — | September 1, 2000 | Socorro | LINEAR | · | 870 m | MPC · JPL |
| 285621 | 2000 RZ_{17} | — | September 1, 2000 | Socorro | LINEAR | · | 4.3 km | MPC · JPL |
| 285622 | 2000 RK_{21} | — | September 1, 2000 | Socorro | LINEAR | · | 1.4 km | MPC · JPL |
| 285623 | 2000 RD_{24} | — | September 1, 2000 | Socorro | LINEAR | · | 1 km | MPC · JPL |
| 285624 | 2000 RT_{25} | — | September 1, 2000 | Socorro | LINEAR | · | 1.6 km | MPC · JPL |
| 285625 | 2000 RD_{34} | — | September 1, 2000 | Socorro | LINEAR | AMO +1km · fast? | 930 m | MPC · JPL |
| 285626 | 2000 RX_{36} | — | September 3, 2000 | Socorro | LINEAR | H | 780 m | MPC · JPL |
| 285627 | 2000 RX_{53} | — | September 1, 2000 | Socorro | LINEAR | · | 4.4 km | MPC · JPL |
| 285628 | 2000 RA_{63} | — | September 2, 2000 | Socorro | LINEAR | (1547) | 2.3 km | MPC · JPL |
| 285629 | 2000 RS_{74} | — | September 3, 2000 | Socorro | LINEAR | · | 3.3 km | MPC · JPL |
| 285630 | 2000 RP_{82} | — | September 1, 2000 | Socorro | LINEAR | · | 2.1 km | MPC · JPL |
| 285631 | 2000 RB_{84} | — | September 2, 2000 | Anderson Mesa | LONEOS | · | 1.7 km | MPC · JPL |
| 285632 | 2000 RJ_{85} | — | September 2, 2000 | Anderson Mesa | LONEOS | · | 4.3 km | MPC · JPL |
| 285633 | 2000 RH_{88} | — | September 3, 2000 | Socorro | LINEAR | · | 4.7 km | MPC · JPL |
| 285634 | 2000 RJ_{89} | — | September 3, 2000 | Socorro | LINEAR | · | 1.5 km | MPC · JPL |
| 285635 | 2000 RS_{92} | — | September 3, 2000 | Socorro | LINEAR | TIR | 4.3 km | MPC · JPL |
| 285636 | 2000 SA | — | September 17, 2000 | Olathe | Robinson, L. | · | 1.7 km | MPC · JPL |
| 285637 | 2000 SS_{4} | — | September 20, 2000 | Socorro | LINEAR | H | 760 m | MPC · JPL |
| 285638 | 2000 SO_{10} | — | September 23, 2000 | Socorro | LINEAR | APO +1km | 1.1 km | MPC · JPL |
| 285639 | 2000 SW_{10} | — | September 24, 2000 | Prescott | P. G. Comba | (2076) | 1.2 km | MPC · JPL |
| 285640 | 2000 SA_{16} | — | September 23, 2000 | Socorro | LINEAR | · | 3.5 km | MPC · JPL |
| 285641 | 2000 SN_{16} | — | September 2, 2000 | Anderson Mesa | LONEOS | · | 860 m | MPC · JPL |
| 285642 | 2000 SS_{16} | — | September 23, 2000 | Socorro | LINEAR | · | 1.3 km | MPC · JPL |
| 285643 | 2000 SC_{18} | — | September 23, 2000 | Socorro | LINEAR | · | 3.6 km | MPC · JPL |
| 285644 | 2000 ST_{18} | — | September 23, 2000 | Socorro | LINEAR | · | 2.2 km | MPC · JPL |
| 285645 | 2000 SQ_{19} | — | September 23, 2000 | Socorro | LINEAR | · | 830 m | MPC · JPL |
| 285646 | 2000 SN_{24} | — | September 26, 2000 | Socorro | LINEAR | H | 850 m | MPC · JPL |
| 285647 | 2000 SE_{26} | — | September 23, 2000 | Socorro | LINEAR | · | 750 m | MPC · JPL |
| 285648 | 2000 SK_{27} | — | September 23, 2000 | Socorro | LINEAR | L5 | 10 km | MPC · JPL |
| 285649 | 2000 SW_{33} | — | September 24, 2000 | Socorro | LINEAR | · | 3.1 km | MPC · JPL |
| 285650 | 2000 SS_{34} | — | September 24, 2000 | Socorro | LINEAR | · | 2.4 km | MPC · JPL |
| 285651 | 2000 SR_{35} | — | September 24, 2000 | Socorro | LINEAR | · | 4.7 km | MPC · JPL |
| 285652 | 2000 SS_{36} | — | September 24, 2000 | Socorro | LINEAR | · | 1.8 km | MPC · JPL |
| 285653 | 2000 SE_{41} | — | September 24, 2000 | Socorro | LINEAR | NYS | 1.7 km | MPC · JPL |
| 285654 | 2000 SX_{43} | — | September 22, 2000 | Socorro | LINEAR | H | 900 m | MPC · JPL |
| 285655 | 2000 SK_{44} | — | September 26, 2000 | Socorro | LINEAR | H | 780 m | MPC · JPL |
| 285656 | 2000 SD_{48} | — | September 23, 2000 | Socorro | LINEAR | JUN | 1.1 km | MPC · JPL |
| 285657 | 2000 SQ_{48} | — | September 23, 2000 | Socorro | LINEAR | TIR | 4.2 km | MPC · JPL |
| 285658 | 2000 SY_{48} | — | September 23, 2000 | Socorro | LINEAR | L5 | 14 km | MPC · JPL |
| 285659 | 2000 SL_{54} | — | September 24, 2000 | Socorro | LINEAR | NYS | 1.5 km | MPC · JPL |
| 285660 | 2000 SZ_{61} | — | September 24, 2000 | Socorro | LINEAR | · | 710 m | MPC · JPL |
| 285661 | 2000 SO_{65} | — | September 24, 2000 | Socorro | LINEAR | V · slow | 920 m | MPC · JPL |
| 285662 | 2000 SA_{69} | — | September 24, 2000 | Socorro | LINEAR | · | 6.1 km | MPC · JPL |
| 285663 | 2000 SY_{77} | — | September 24, 2000 | Socorro | LINEAR | · | 1.3 km | MPC · JPL |
| 285664 | 2000 SP_{80} | — | September 24, 2000 | Socorro | LINEAR | · | 970 m | MPC · JPL |
| 285665 | 2000 SQ_{81} | — | September 24, 2000 | Socorro | LINEAR | NYS | 950 m | MPC · JPL |
| 285666 | 2000 SM_{92} | — | September 23, 2000 | Socorro | LINEAR | TIR | 3.9 km | MPC · JPL |
| 285667 | 2000 SJ_{97} | — | September 23, 2000 | Socorro | LINEAR | ERI | 2.4 km | MPC · JPL |
| 285668 | 2000 SV_{102} | — | September 24, 2000 | Socorro | LINEAR | NYS | 1.5 km | MPC · JPL |
| 285669 | 2000 SF_{106} | — | September 24, 2000 | Socorro | LINEAR | · | 950 m | MPC · JPL |
| 285670 | 2000 SE_{114} | — | September 24, 2000 | Socorro | LINEAR | · | 1.7 km | MPC · JPL |
| 285671 | 2000 SY_{118} | — | September 24, 2000 | Socorro | LINEAR | · | 3.8 km | MPC · JPL |
| 285672 | 2000 SD_{126} | — | September 24, 2000 | Socorro | LINEAR | EUN | 1.5 km | MPC · JPL |
| 285673 | 2000 SG_{132} | — | September 22, 2000 | Socorro | LINEAR | · | 4.5 km | MPC · JPL |
| 285674 | 2000 ST_{133} | — | September 23, 2000 | Socorro | LINEAR | · | 1.0 km | MPC · JPL |
| 285675 | 2000 SX_{134} | — | September 23, 2000 | Socorro | LINEAR | EOS | 3.3 km | MPC · JPL |
| 285676 | 2000 SQ_{136} | — | September 23, 2000 | Socorro | LINEAR | · | 1.4 km | MPC · JPL |
| 285677 | 2000 SS_{136} | — | September 23, 2000 | Socorro | LINEAR | · | 780 m | MPC · JPL |
| 285678 | 2000 SQ_{141} | — | September 23, 2000 | Socorro | LINEAR | · | 1.7 km | MPC · JPL |
| 285679 | 2000 SL_{142} | — | September 23, 2000 | Socorro | LINEAR | · | 2.6 km | MPC · JPL |
| 285680 | 2000 SX_{143} | — | September 24, 2000 | Socorro | LINEAR | EOS | 2.7 km | MPC · JPL |
| 285681 | 2000 SY_{143} | — | September 24, 2000 | Socorro | LINEAR | · | 3.7 km | MPC · JPL |
| 285682 | 2000 SH_{145} | — | September 24, 2000 | Socorro | LINEAR | · | 1.3 km | MPC · JPL |
| 285683 | 2000 SR_{151} | — | September 24, 2000 | Socorro | LINEAR | THB | 3.3 km | MPC · JPL |
| 285684 | 2000 SR_{152} | — | September 24, 2000 | Socorro | LINEAR | · | 1.8 km | MPC · JPL |
| 285685 | 2000 SW_{156} | — | September 25, 2000 | Socorro | LINEAR | · | 4.3 km | MPC · JPL |
| 285686 | 2000 SV_{162} | — | September 30, 2000 | Elmira | Cecce, A. J. | · | 1.6 km | MPC · JPL |
| 285687 | 2000 SM_{163} | — | September 30, 2000 | Ondřejov | P. Kušnirák, P. Pravec | (5) | 1.2 km | MPC · JPL |
| 285688 | 2000 SS_{163} | — | September 24, 2000 | Socorro | LINEAR | H | 720 m | MPC · JPL |
| 285689 | 2000 SM_{164} | — | September 26, 2000 | Socorro | LINEAR | PHO | 3.2 km | MPC · JPL |
| 285690 | 2000 SW_{184} | — | September 20, 2000 | Haleakala | NEAT | · | 2.8 km | MPC · JPL |
| 285691 | 2000 SB_{186} | — | September 21, 2000 | Kitt Peak | Spacewatch | MAS | 760 m | MPC · JPL |
| 285692 | 2000 ST_{186} | — | September 21, 2000 | Haleakala | NEAT | · | 940 m | MPC · JPL |
| 285693 | 2000 SN_{192} | — | September 24, 2000 | Socorro | LINEAR | · | 2.6 km | MPC · JPL |
| 285694 | 2000 SV_{193} | — | September 24, 2000 | Socorro | LINEAR | · | 1.9 km | MPC · JPL |
| 285695 | 2000 SH_{194} | — | September 24, 2000 | Socorro | LINEAR | · | 1.4 km | MPC · JPL |
| 285696 | 2000 SQ_{194} | — | September 24, 2000 | Socorro | LINEAR | · | 810 m | MPC · JPL |
| 285697 | 2000 SZ_{194} | — | September 24, 2000 | Socorro | LINEAR | · | 1.1 km | MPC · JPL |
| 285698 | 2000 SG_{200} | — | September 24, 2000 | Socorro | LINEAR | · | 4.2 km | MPC · JPL |
| 285699 | 2000 SN_{201} | — | September 24, 2000 | Socorro | LINEAR | · | 2.9 km | MPC · JPL |
| 285700 | 2000 SF_{202} | — | September 24, 2000 | Socorro | LINEAR | AGN | 1.6 km | MPC · JPL |

== 285701–285800 ==
back to top

| Designation | | | Discovery | | | Properties | | Ref |
| Permanent | Provisional | Named after | Date | Site | Discoverer(s) | Category | Diam. | Ref |
|---|---|---|---|---|---|---|---|---|
| 285701 | 2000 SH_{204} | — | September 24, 2000 | Socorro | LINEAR | NYS | 1.4 km | MPC · JPL |
| 285702 | 2000 SS_{216} | — | September 26, 2000 | Socorro | LINEAR | V | 1.0 km | MPC · JPL |
| 285703 | 2000 ST_{223} | — | September 27, 2000 | Socorro | LINEAR | · | 1.5 km | MPC · JPL |
| 285704 | 2000 SK_{234} | — | September 21, 2000 | Socorro | LINEAR | · | 2.8 km | MPC · JPL |
| 285705 | 2000 SV_{237} | — | September 25, 2000 | Socorro | LINEAR | · | 2.4 km | MPC · JPL |
| 285706 | 2000 SJ_{238} | — | September 26, 2000 | Socorro | LINEAR | · | 3.3 km | MPC · JPL |
| 285707 | 2000 SJ_{240} | — | September 25, 2000 | Socorro | LINEAR | BAR | 2.7 km | MPC · JPL |
| 285708 | 2000 SH_{246} | — | September 24, 2000 | Socorro | LINEAR | · | 950 m | MPC · JPL |
| 285709 | 2000 SR_{248} | — | September 24, 2000 | Socorro | LINEAR | NYS | 1.5 km | MPC · JPL |
| 285710 | 2000 SB_{251} | — | September 24, 2000 | Socorro | LINEAR | V | 960 m | MPC · JPL |
| 285711 | 2000 SR_{256} | — | September 24, 2000 | Socorro | LINEAR | V | 1.2 km | MPC · JPL |
| 285712 | 2000 SX_{257} | — | September 24, 2000 | Socorro | LINEAR | · | 5.5 km | MPC · JPL |
| 285713 | 2000 SM_{258} | — | September 24, 2000 | Socorro | LINEAR | · | 3.3 km | MPC · JPL |
| 285714 | 2000 SN_{260} | — | September 24, 2000 | Socorro | LINEAR | NYS | 1.2 km | MPC · JPL |
| 285715 | 2000 SN_{261} | — | September 24, 2000 | Socorro | LINEAR | MAS | 1.1 km | MPC · JPL |
| 285716 | 2000 SW_{268} | — | September 27, 2000 | Socorro | LINEAR | · | 1.9 km | MPC · JPL |
| 285717 | 2000 SJ_{284} | — | September 23, 2000 | Socorro | LINEAR | THB | 3.1 km | MPC · JPL |
| 285718 | 2000 SH_{289} | — | September 27, 2000 | Socorro | LINEAR | · | 1.7 km | MPC · JPL |
| 285719 | 2000 SD_{290} | — | September 27, 2000 | Socorro | LINEAR | · | 1.3 km | MPC · JPL |
| 285720 | 2000 SJ_{304} | — | September 30, 2000 | Socorro | LINEAR | · | 4.7 km | MPC · JPL |
| 285721 | 2000 SA_{306} | — | September 30, 2000 | Socorro | LINEAR | · | 3.7 km | MPC · JPL |
| 285722 | 2000 SJ_{308} | — | September 30, 2000 | Socorro | LINEAR | · | 4.0 km | MPC · JPL |
| 285723 | 2000 SS_{309} | — | September 24, 2000 | Socorro | LINEAR | · | 5.2 km | MPC · JPL |
| 285724 | 2000 SX_{314} | — | September 28, 2000 | Socorro | LINEAR | · | 5.1 km | MPC · JPL |
| 285725 | 2000 SC_{317} | — | September 30, 2000 | Socorro | LINEAR | · | 3.5 km | MPC · JPL |
| 285726 | 2000 SK_{317} | — | September 30, 2000 | Socorro | LINEAR | · | 6.6 km | MPC · JPL |
| 285727 | 2000 SJ_{322} | — | September 28, 2000 | Kitt Peak | Spacewatch | · | 1.2 km | MPC · JPL |
| 285728 | 2000 SO_{325} | — | September 29, 2000 | Kitt Peak | Spacewatch | NYS | 1.3 km | MPC · JPL |
| 285729 | 2000 SR_{328} | — | September 22, 2000 | Haute Provence | Thuillot, W. | · | 4.8 km | MPC · JPL |
| 285730 | 2000 SJ_{335} | — | September 26, 2000 | Haleakala | NEAT | · | 1.9 km | MPC · JPL |
| 285731 | 2000 SV_{338} | — | September 25, 2000 | Haleakala | NEAT | · | 2.7 km | MPC · JPL |
| 285732 | 2000 SU_{345} | — | September 19, 2000 | Kitt Peak | M. W. Buie | · | 820 m | MPC · JPL |
| 285733 | 2000 SW_{361} | — | September 23, 2000 | Anderson Mesa | LONEOS | · | 1.1 km | MPC · JPL |
| 285734 | 2000 SW_{365} | — | September 22, 2000 | Anderson Mesa | LONEOS | · | 4.5 km | MPC · JPL |
| 285735 | 2000 SW_{375} | — | September 26, 2000 | Apache Point | SDSS | EOS | 2.2 km | MPC · JPL |
| 285736 | 2000 TV_{2} | — | October 1, 2000 | Socorro | LINEAR | · | 3.2 km | MPC · JPL |
| 285737 | 2000 TV_{7} | — | October 1, 2000 | Socorro | LINEAR | · | 1.7 km | MPC · JPL |
| 285738 | 2000 TH_{8} | — | October 1, 2000 | Socorro | LINEAR | · | 3.0 km | MPC · JPL |
| 285739 | 2000 TP_{14} | — | October 1, 2000 | Socorro | LINEAR | · | 870 m | MPC · JPL |
| 285740 | 2000 TQ_{15} | — | October 1, 2000 | Socorro | LINEAR | NYS | 1.3 km | MPC · JPL |
| 285741 | 2000 TH_{23} | — | October 1, 2000 | Socorro | LINEAR | · | 6.4 km | MPC · JPL |
| 285742 | 2000 TL_{23} | — | October 1, 2000 | Socorro | LINEAR | · | 3.8 km | MPC · JPL |
| 285743 | 2000 TO_{23} | — | October 1, 2000 | Socorro | LINEAR | EUN | 1.4 km | MPC · JPL |
| 285744 | 2000 TG_{31} | — | October 4, 2000 | Kitt Peak | Spacewatch | · | 1.5 km | MPC · JPL |
| 285745 | 2000 TP_{31} | — | October 5, 2000 | Kitt Peak | Spacewatch | · | 1.6 km | MPC · JPL |
| 285746 | 2000 TH_{38} | — | October 1, 2000 | Socorro | LINEAR | · | 3.6 km | MPC · JPL |
| 285747 | 2000 TY_{38} | — | October 1, 2000 | Socorro | LINEAR | · | 1.7 km | MPC · JPL |
| 285748 | 2000 TN_{41} | — | October 1, 2000 | Anderson Mesa | LONEOS | · | 2.2 km | MPC · JPL |
| 285749 | 2000 TZ_{42} | — | October 1, 2000 | Socorro | LINEAR | · | 4.8 km | MPC · JPL |
| 285750 | 2000 TG_{43} | — | October 1, 2000 | Socorro | LINEAR | EUN | 2.0 km | MPC · JPL |
| 285751 | 2000 TG_{56} | — | October 1, 2000 | Kitt Peak | Spacewatch | MAR | 1.7 km | MPC · JPL |
| 285752 | 2000 TR_{57} | — | October 2, 2000 | Socorro | LINEAR | · | 1.9 km | MPC · JPL |
| 285753 | 2000 UE_{1} | — | October 22, 2000 | Ondřejov | L. Kotková | · | 4.6 km | MPC · JPL |
| 285754 | 2000 UO_{3} | — | October 24, 2000 | Socorro | LINEAR | · | 1.8 km | MPC · JPL |
| 285755 | 2000 UH_{4} | — | October 24, 2000 | Socorro | LINEAR | · | 4.3 km | MPC · JPL |
| 285756 | 2000 UF_{14} | — | October 25, 2000 | Socorro | LINEAR | (10369) | 3.5 km | MPC · JPL |
| 285757 | 2000 UW_{17} | — | October 24, 2000 | Socorro | LINEAR | · | 2.1 km | MPC · JPL |
| 285758 | 2000 UM_{18} | — | October 25, 2000 | Socorro | LINEAR | · | 2.9 km | MPC · JPL |
| 285759 | 2000 UB_{22} | — | October 24, 2000 | Socorro | LINEAR | · | 1.8 km | MPC · JPL |
| 285760 | 2000 UE_{24} | — | October 24, 2000 | Socorro | LINEAR | · | 2.7 km | MPC · JPL |
| 285761 | 2000 UE_{25} | — | October 24, 2000 | Socorro | LINEAR | · | 1.6 km | MPC · JPL |
| 285762 | 2000 UE_{28} | — | October 25, 2000 | Socorro | LINEAR | TIR | 3.6 km | MPC · JPL |
| 285763 | 2000 UH_{31} | — | October 29, 2000 | Kitt Peak | Spacewatch | NYS | 1.2 km | MPC · JPL |
| 285764 | 2000 UJ_{32} | — | October 29, 2000 | Kitt Peak | Spacewatch | HOF | 3.1 km | MPC · JPL |
| 285765 | 2000 UA_{42} | — | October 24, 2000 | Socorro | LINEAR | THB | 4.8 km | MPC · JPL |
| 285766 | 2000 UG_{50} | — | October 24, 2000 | Socorro | LINEAR | · | 2.9 km | MPC · JPL |
| 285767 | 2000 UW_{50} | — | October 24, 2000 | Socorro | LINEAR | NYS | 1.3 km | MPC · JPL |
| 285768 | 2000 UP_{61} | — | October 25, 2000 | Socorro | LINEAR | · | 1.5 km | MPC · JPL |
| 285769 | 2000 UO_{64} | — | October 25, 2000 | Socorro | LINEAR | · | 1.5 km | MPC · JPL |
| 285770 | 2000 UA_{68} | — | October 25, 2000 | Socorro | LINEAR | · | 2.8 km | MPC · JPL |
| 285771 | 2000 UH_{74} | — | October 29, 2000 | Socorro | LINEAR | TIR | 3.9 km | MPC · JPL |
| 285772 | 2000 UE_{82} | — | October 25, 2000 | Socorro | LINEAR | · | 4.4 km | MPC · JPL |
| 285773 | 2000 UW_{82} | — | October 30, 2000 | Socorro | LINEAR | NYS | 1.4 km | MPC · JPL |
| 285774 | 2000 UF_{84} | — | October 31, 2000 | Socorro | LINEAR | · | 2.9 km | MPC · JPL |
| 285775 | 2000 UC_{88} | — | October 31, 2000 | Socorro | LINEAR | VER | 3.6 km | MPC · JPL |
| 285776 | 2000 UV_{92} | — | October 25, 2000 | Socorro | LINEAR | · | 1.7 km | MPC · JPL |
| 285777 | 2000 UW_{101} | — | October 25, 2000 | Socorro | LINEAR | · | 1.5 km | MPC · JPL |
| 285778 | 2000 UN_{105} | — | October 29, 2000 | Socorro | LINEAR | · | 4.2 km | MPC · JPL |
| 285779 | 2000 VH_{54} | — | November 3, 2000 | Socorro | LINEAR | · | 3.8 km | MPC · JPL |
| 285780 | 2000 VB_{61} | — | November 2, 2000 | Socorro | LINEAR | THM | 3.4 km | MPC · JPL |
| 285781 | 2000 WW_{9} | — | November 22, 2000 | Eskridge | G. Hug | · | 4.0 km | MPC · JPL |
| 285782 | 2000 WQ_{11} | — | November 20, 2000 | Kitt Peak | Spacewatch | · | 4.6 km | MPC · JPL |
| 285783 | 2000 WT_{21} | — | November 22, 2000 | Haleakala | NEAT | · | 2.2 km | MPC · JPL |
| 285784 | 2000 WW_{29} | — | November 25, 2000 | Junk Bond | J. Medkeff | · | 1.4 km | MPC · JPL |
| 285785 | 2000 WP_{43} | — | November 21, 2000 | Socorro | LINEAR | T_{j} (2.98) · 3:2 | 6.2 km | MPC · JPL |
| 285786 | 2000 WR_{64} | — | November 27, 2000 | Kitt Peak | Spacewatch | · | 730 m | MPC · JPL |
| 285787 | 2000 WF_{70} | — | November 19, 2000 | Socorro | LINEAR | V | 870 m | MPC · JPL |
| 285788 | 2000 WE_{73} | — | November 20, 2000 | Socorro | LINEAR | · | 2.9 km | MPC · JPL |
| 285789 | 2000 WR_{95} | — | November 21, 2000 | Socorro | LINEAR | V | 990 m | MPC · JPL |
| 285790 | 2000 WS_{101} | — | November 25, 2000 | Socorro | LINEAR | · | 5.7 km | MPC · JPL |
| 285791 | 2000 WN_{141} | — | November 19, 2000 | Socorro | LINEAR | T_{j} (2.97) | 5.8 km | MPC · JPL |
| 285792 | 2000 WB_{150} | — | November 29, 2000 | Kitt Peak | Spacewatch | · | 2.3 km | MPC · JPL |
| 285793 | 2000 WC_{150} | — | November 29, 2000 | Kitt Peak | Spacewatch | · | 2.6 km | MPC · JPL |
| 285794 | 2000 WH_{155} | — | November 30, 2000 | Socorro | LINEAR | · | 1.6 km | MPC · JPL |
| 285795 | 2000 WK_{162} | — | November 20, 2000 | Socorro | LINEAR | · | 830 m | MPC · JPL |
| 285796 | 2000 WG_{181} | — | November 29, 2000 | Haleakala | NEAT | · | 860 m | MPC · JPL |
| 285797 | 2000 WN_{193} | — | November 24, 2000 | Kitt Peak | Deep Lens Survey | · | 780 m | MPC · JPL |
| 285798 | 2000 WT_{197} | — | November 19, 2000 | Socorro | LINEAR | · | 1.9 km | MPC · JPL |
| 285799 | 2000 XW_{12} | — | December 4, 2000 | Socorro | LINEAR | TIR | 4.1 km | MPC · JPL |
| 285800 | 2000 XG_{19} | — | December 4, 2000 | Socorro | LINEAR | · | 2.6 km | MPC · JPL |

== 285801–285900 ==
back to top

| Designation | | | Discovery | | | Properties | | Ref |
| Permanent | Provisional | Named after | Date | Site | Discoverer(s) | Category | Diam. | Ref |
|---|---|---|---|---|---|---|---|---|
| 285801 | 2000 YE_{4} | — | December 19, 2000 | Bohyunsan | Jeon, Y.-B., Lee, B.-C. | · | 2.8 km | MPC · JPL |
| 285802 | 2000 YJ_{12} | — | December 22, 2000 | Ondřejov | P. Kušnirák, P. Pravec | PHO | 2.8 km | MPC · JPL |
| 285803 | 2000 YY_{22} | — | December 28, 2000 | Kitt Peak | Spacewatch | · | 2.8 km | MPC · JPL |
| 285804 | 2000 YE_{27} | — | December 28, 2000 | Kitt Peak | Spacewatch | · | 1.8 km | MPC · JPL |
| 285805 | 2000 YV_{27} | — | December 30, 2000 | Kitt Peak | Spacewatch | · | 1.9 km | MPC · JPL |
| 285806 | 2000 YV_{41} | — | December 30, 2000 | Socorro | LINEAR | · | 3.1 km | MPC · JPL |
| 285807 | 2000 YG_{60} | — | December 30, 2000 | Socorro | LINEAR | · | 2.1 km | MPC · JPL |
| 285808 | 2000 YO_{62} | — | December 30, 2000 | Socorro | LINEAR | · | 1.3 km | MPC · JPL |
| 285809 | 2000 YA_{74} | — | December 30, 2000 | Socorro | LINEAR | · | 4.4 km | MPC · JPL |
| 285810 | 2000 YR_{82} | — | December 30, 2000 | Socorro | LINEAR | H | 680 m | MPC · JPL |
| 285811 | 2000 YE_{98} | — | December 30, 2000 | Socorro | LINEAR | MAR | 1.7 km | MPC · JPL |
| 285812 | 2000 YM_{102} | — | December 28, 2000 | Socorro | LINEAR | H | 750 m | MPC · JPL |
| 285813 | 2000 YQ_{129} | — | December 30, 2000 | Kitt Peak | Spacewatch | · | 770 m | MPC · JPL |
| 285814 | 2000 YT_{135} | — | December 20, 2000 | Kitt Peak | Spacewatch | · | 1.4 km | MPC · JPL |
| 285815 | 2001 AJ_{12} | — | January 2, 2001 | Socorro | LINEAR | NYS | 1.5 km | MPC · JPL |
| 285816 | 2001 BV_{9} | — | January 16, 2001 | Kitt Peak | Spacewatch | · | 1.2 km | MPC · JPL |
| 285817 | 2001 BR_{18} | — | January 19, 2001 | Socorro | LINEAR | · | 3.1 km | MPC · JPL |
| 285818 | 2001 BZ_{39} | — | January 19, 2001 | Haleakala | NEAT | AMO | 610 m | MPC · JPL |
| 285819 | 2001 BB_{41} | — | January 24, 2001 | Socorro | LINEAR | · | 1.6 km | MPC · JPL |
| 285820 | 2001 BY_{56} | — | January 19, 2001 | Kitt Peak | Spacewatch | NYS | 1.6 km | MPC · JPL |
| 285821 | 2001 CB_{41} | — | February 15, 2001 | Socorro | LINEAR | · | 1.9 km | MPC · JPL |
| 285822 | 2001 CS_{47} | — | February 12, 2001 | Anderson Mesa | LONEOS | · | 2.5 km | MPC · JPL |
| 285823 | 2001 DP_{14} | — | February 16, 2001 | Nogales | Tenagra II | · | 4.5 km | MPC · JPL |
| 285824 | 2001 DU_{25} | — | February 17, 2001 | Socorro | LINEAR | · | 2.7 km | MPC · JPL |
| 285825 | 2001 DA_{39} | — | February 19, 2001 | Socorro | LINEAR | · | 3.2 km | MPC · JPL |
| 285826 | 2001 DY_{41} | — | February 19, 2001 | Socorro | LINEAR | (5) | 1.7 km | MPC · JPL |
| 285827 | 2001 DK_{42} | — | February 19, 2001 | Socorro | LINEAR | · | 1.5 km | MPC · JPL |
| 285828 | 2001 DO_{42} | — | February 19, 2001 | Socorro | LINEAR | · | 1.9 km | MPC · JPL |
| 285829 | 2001 DL_{55} | — | February 16, 2001 | Kitt Peak | Spacewatch | · | 1.1 km | MPC · JPL |
| 285830 | 2001 DS_{62} | — | February 19, 2001 | Socorro | LINEAR | · | 2.3 km | MPC · JPL |
| 285831 | 2001 DF_{63} | — | February 19, 2001 | Socorro | LINEAR | · | 920 m | MPC · JPL |
| 285832 | 2001 DS_{77} | — | February 21, 2001 | Kitt Peak | Spacewatch | URS | 4.5 km | MPC · JPL |
| 285833 | 2001 DX_{77} | — | February 22, 2001 | Kitt Peak | Spacewatch | · | 1.9 km | MPC · JPL |
| 285834 | 2001 DH_{83} | — | February 22, 2001 | Kitt Peak | Spacewatch | · | 2.9 km | MPC · JPL |
| 285835 | 2001 DW_{83} | — | February 23, 2001 | Cerro Tololo | Deep Lens Survey | CYB | 6.3 km | MPC · JPL |
| 285836 | 2001 ET_{18} | — | March 14, 2001 | Anderson Mesa | LONEOS | · | 2.1 km | MPC · JPL |
| 285837 | 2001 EZ_{22} | — | March 15, 2001 | Kitt Peak | Spacewatch | MAS | 900 m | MPC · JPL |
| 285838 | 2001 FA_{1} | — | March 17, 2001 | Socorro | LINEAR | AMO +1km | 900 m | MPC · JPL |
| 285839 | 2001 FL_{35} | — | March 18, 2001 | Socorro | LINEAR | · | 5.5 km | MPC · JPL |
| 285840 | 2001 FP_{49} | — | March 18, 2001 | Socorro | LINEAR | · | 1.3 km | MPC · JPL |
| 285841 | 2001 FD_{61} | — | March 19, 2001 | Socorro | LINEAR | · | 2.5 km | MPC · JPL |
| 285842 | 2001 FK_{85} | — | March 26, 2001 | Kitt Peak | Spacewatch | · | 1.5 km | MPC · JPL |
| 285843 | 2001 FM_{87} | — | March 21, 2001 | Anderson Mesa | LONEOS | · | 1.6 km | MPC · JPL |
| 285844 | 2001 FL_{89} | — | March 27, 2001 | Kitt Peak | Spacewatch | · | 2.0 km | MPC · JPL |
| 285845 | 2001 FP_{107} | — | March 18, 2001 | Anderson Mesa | LONEOS | RAF | 1.4 km | MPC · JPL |
| 285846 | 2001 FO_{108} | — | March 18, 2001 | Socorro | LINEAR | · | 1.6 km | MPC · JPL |
| 285847 | 2001 FJ_{110} | — | March 18, 2001 | Socorro | LINEAR | · | 1.9 km | MPC · JPL |
| 285848 | 2001 FS_{111} | — | March 18, 2001 | Socorro | LINEAR | EUN | 1.6 km | MPC · JPL |
| 285849 | 2001 FR_{118} | — | March 20, 2001 | Haleakala | NEAT | (18466) | 3.5 km | MPC · JPL |
| 285850 | 2001 FU_{158} | — | March 27, 2001 | Haleakala | NEAT | · | 2.4 km | MPC · JPL |
| 285851 | 2001 FQ_{168} | — | March 23, 2001 | Anderson Mesa | LONEOS | · | 2.1 km | MPC · JPL |
| 285852 | 2001 FA_{179} | — | March 20, 2001 | Anderson Mesa | LONEOS | EUN | 1.9 km | MPC · JPL |
| 285853 | 2001 FG_{181} | — | March 21, 2001 | Kitt Peak | Spacewatch | · | 1.5 km | MPC · JPL |
| 285854 | 2001 FH_{190} | — | March 18, 2001 | Haleakala | NEAT | EUN | 2.0 km | MPC · JPL |
| 285855 | 2001 FO_{196} | — | March 20, 2001 | Kitt Peak | Spacewatch | · | 1.5 km | MPC · JPL |
| 285856 | 2001 FV_{196} | — | March 21, 2001 | Anderson Mesa | LONEOS | · | 1.8 km | MPC · JPL |
| 285857 | 2001 GD_{3} | — | April 14, 2001 | Socorro | LINEAR | · | 1.6 km | MPC · JPL |
| 285858 | 2001 GE_{10} | — | April 15, 2001 | Haleakala | NEAT | ERI | 2.6 km | MPC · JPL |
| 285859 | 2001 HZ_{14} | — | April 23, 2001 | Kitt Peak | Spacewatch | GAL | 1.9 km | MPC · JPL |
| 285860 | 2001 HB_{26} | — | April 27, 2001 | Kitt Peak | Spacewatch | · | 3.8 km | MPC · JPL |
| 285861 | 2001 HE_{40} | — | April 30, 2001 | Kitt Peak | Spacewatch | · | 2.8 km | MPC · JPL |
| 285862 | 2001 HM_{48} | — | April 21, 2001 | Socorro | LINEAR | EUP | 6.5 km | MPC · JPL |
| 285863 | 2001 HD_{58} | — | April 25, 2001 | Anderson Mesa | LONEOS | · | 1.5 km | MPC · JPL |
| 285864 | 2001 HN_{60} | — | April 24, 2001 | Anderson Mesa | LONEOS | · | 2.3 km | MPC · JPL |
| 285865 | 2001 JP_{7} | — | May 15, 2001 | Anderson Mesa | LONEOS | · | 1.8 km | MPC · JPL |
| 285866 | 2001 KV_{9} | — | May 18, 2001 | Socorro | LINEAR | · | 5.0 km | MPC · JPL |
| 285867 | 2001 KJ_{10} | — | May 18, 2001 | Socorro | LINEAR | · | 2.1 km | MPC · JPL |
| 285868 | 2001 KM_{15} | — | May 18, 2001 | Socorro | LINEAR | PHO | 2.2 km | MPC · JPL |
| 285869 | 2001 KK_{16} | — | May 18, 2001 | Socorro | LINEAR | · | 1.8 km | MPC · JPL |
| 285870 | 2001 KP_{31} | — | May 22, 2001 | Socorro | LINEAR | H | 890 m | MPC · JPL |
| 285871 | 2001 MJ_{21} | — | June 27, 2001 | Palomar | NEAT | · | 1.1 km | MPC · JPL |
| 285872 | 2001 NR_{5} | — | July 13, 2001 | Palomar | NEAT | · | 840 m | MPC · JPL |
| 285873 | 2001 NY_{7} | — | July 14, 2001 | Palomar | NEAT | · | 1.4 km | MPC · JPL |
| 285874 | 2001 NK_{9} | — | July 13, 2001 | Palomar | NEAT | · | 2.0 km | MPC · JPL |
| 285875 | 2001 OB_{1} | — | July 17, 2001 | Haleakala | NEAT | · | 1.2 km | MPC · JPL |
| 285876 | 2001 OM_{3} | — | July 17, 2001 | Palomar | NEAT | · | 1.1 km | MPC · JPL |
| 285877 | 2001 OY_{15} | — | July 18, 2001 | Palomar | NEAT | · | 1.6 km | MPC · JPL |
| 285878 | 2001 OP_{55} | — | July 22, 2001 | Palomar | NEAT | · | 1.6 km | MPC · JPL |
| 285879 | 2001 OJ_{61} | — | July 21, 2001 | Haleakala | NEAT | · | 3.7 km | MPC · JPL |
| 285880 | 2001 OC_{76} | — | July 29, 2001 | Palomar | NEAT | · | 2.2 km | MPC · JPL |
| 285881 | 2001 OO_{77} | — | July 26, 2001 | Palomar | NEAT | · | 1.4 km | MPC · JPL |
| 285882 | 2001 OM_{95} | — | July 30, 2001 | Palomar | NEAT | · | 1.8 km | MPC · JPL |
| 285883 | 2001 OR_{95} | — | July 24, 2001 | Bergisch Gladbach | W. Bickel | GEF | 2.0 km | MPC · JPL |
| 285884 | 2001 PN_{1} | — | August 3, 2001 | Haleakala | NEAT | · | 2.6 km | MPC · JPL |
| 285885 | 2001 PN_{4} | — | August 10, 2001 | Palomar | NEAT | HNS | 1.7 km | MPC · JPL |
| 285886 | 2001 PX_{7} | — | August 10, 2001 | Palomar | NEAT | · | 3.0 km | MPC · JPL |
| 285887 | 2001 PH_{19} | — | August 10, 2001 | Palomar | NEAT | · | 1.6 km | MPC · JPL |
| 285888 | 2001 PO_{29} | — | August 13, 2001 | Uccle | T. Pauwels | · | 1.9 km | MPC · JPL |
| 285889 | 2001 PZ_{33} | — | August 10, 2001 | Palomar | NEAT | · | 2.2 km | MPC · JPL |
| 285890 | 2001 PQ_{55} | — | August 14, 2001 | Haleakala | NEAT | · | 1.4 km | MPC · JPL |
| 285891 | 2001 PC_{58} | — | August 14, 2001 | Haleakala | NEAT | · | 2.2 km | MPC · JPL |
| 285892 | 2001 QZ_{12} | — | August 16, 2001 | Socorro | LINEAR | · | 830 m | MPC · JPL |
| 285893 | 2001 QT_{15} | — | August 16, 2001 | Socorro | LINEAR | · | 1.3 km | MPC · JPL |
| 285894 | 2001 QV_{25} | — | August 16, 2001 | Socorro | LINEAR | · | 1.3 km | MPC · JPL |
| 285895 | 2001 QC_{37} | — | August 16, 2001 | Socorro | LINEAR | DOR | 3.0 km | MPC · JPL |
| 285896 | 2001 QX_{45} | — | August 16, 2001 | Socorro | LINEAR | · | 1.3 km | MPC · JPL |
| 285897 | 2001 QK_{49} | — | August 16, 2001 | Socorro | LINEAR | · | 740 m | MPC · JPL |
| 285898 | 2001 QV_{64} | — | August 16, 2001 | Socorro | LINEAR | · | 3.9 km | MPC · JPL |
| 285899 | 2001 QQ_{80} | — | August 17, 2001 | Socorro | LINEAR | H | 600 m | MPC · JPL |
| 285900 | 2001 QH_{86} | — | August 17, 2001 | Palomar | NEAT | · | 1.5 km | MPC · JPL |

== 285901–286000 ==
back to top

| Designation | | | Discovery | | | Properties | | Ref |
| Permanent | Provisional | Named after | Date | Site | Discoverer(s) | Category | Diam. | Ref |
|---|---|---|---|---|---|---|---|---|
| 285901 | 2001 QL_{88} | — | August 22, 2001 | Kitt Peak | Spacewatch | · | 2.2 km | MPC · JPL |
| 285902 | 2001 QS_{99} | — | August 19, 2001 | Socorro | LINEAR | PHO | 1.4 km | MPC · JPL |
| 285903 | 2001 QK_{102} | — | August 19, 2001 | Socorro | LINEAR | · | 1.7 km | MPC · JPL |
| 285904 | 2001 QH_{103} | — | August 19, 2001 | Socorro | LINEAR | · | 1.2 km | MPC · JPL |
| 285905 | 2001 QC_{122} | — | August 19, 2001 | Socorro | LINEAR | (5) | 1.4 km | MPC · JPL |
| 285906 | 2001 QQ_{123} | — | August 19, 2001 | Socorro | LINEAR | EUN | 1.4 km | MPC · JPL |
| 285907 | 2001 QX_{126} | — | August 20, 2001 | Socorro | LINEAR | · | 1.9 km | MPC · JPL |
| 285908 | 2001 QD_{131} | — | August 20, 2001 | Socorro | LINEAR | · | 1.2 km | MPC · JPL |
| 285909 | 2001 QF_{143} | — | August 21, 2001 | Kitt Peak | Spacewatch | KOR | 1.5 km | MPC · JPL |
| 285910 | 2001 QX_{148} | — | August 14, 2001 | Palomar | NEAT | 3:2 · SHU | 6.9 km | MPC · JPL |
| 285911 | 2001 QN_{150} | — | August 22, 2001 | Socorro | LINEAR | · | 3.1 km | MPC · JPL |
| 285912 | 2001 QD_{155} | — | August 23, 2001 | Anderson Mesa | LONEOS | (5) | 1.9 km | MPC · JPL |
| 285913 | 2001 QQ_{156} | — | August 23, 2001 | Anderson Mesa | LONEOS | · | 1.7 km | MPC · JPL |
| 285914 | 2001 QP_{161} | — | August 23, 2001 | Anderson Mesa | LONEOS | · | 1.8 km | MPC · JPL |
| 285915 | 2001 QE_{164} | — | August 21, 2001 | Palomar | NEAT | · | 1.8 km | MPC · JPL |
| 285916 | 2001 QT_{168} | — | August 26, 2001 | Haleakala | NEAT | · | 4.6 km | MPC · JPL |
| 285917 | 2001 QC_{172} | — | August 25, 2001 | Socorro | LINEAR | · | 3.2 km | MPC · JPL |
| 285918 | 2001 QX_{175} | — | August 23, 2001 | Kitt Peak | Spacewatch | · | 1.1 km | MPC · JPL |
| 285919 | 2001 QU_{183} | — | August 21, 2001 | Desert Eagle | W. K. Y. Yeung | · | 1.9 km | MPC · JPL |
| 285920 | 2001 QV_{183} | — | August 21, 2001 | Kitt Peak | Spacewatch | · | 880 m | MPC · JPL |
| 285921 | 2001 QD_{192} | — | August 22, 2001 | Socorro | LINEAR | JUN | 1.6 km | MPC · JPL |
| 285922 | 2001 QC_{212} | — | August 23, 2001 | Anderson Mesa | LONEOS | · | 2.5 km | MPC · JPL |
| 285923 | 2001 QN_{213} | — | August 23, 2001 | Anderson Mesa | LONEOS | · | 730 m | MPC · JPL |
| 285924 | 2001 QF_{217} | — | August 23, 2001 | Anderson Mesa | LONEOS | · | 1.9 km | MPC · JPL |
| 285925 | 2001 QM_{219} | — | August 23, 2001 | Kitt Peak | Spacewatch | · | 980 m | MPC · JPL |
| 285926 | 2001 QS_{222} | — | August 24, 2001 | Anderson Mesa | LONEOS | · | 2.2 km | MPC · JPL |
| 285927 | 2001 QN_{233} | — | August 24, 2001 | Socorro | LINEAR | · | 1.3 km | MPC · JPL |
| 285928 | 2001 QP_{243} | — | August 24, 2001 | Socorro | LINEAR | · | 4.0 km | MPC · JPL |
| 285929 | 2001 QF_{252} | — | August 25, 2001 | Socorro | LINEAR | · | 830 m | MPC · JPL |
| 285930 | 2001 QP_{253} | — | August 25, 2001 | Socorro | LINEAR | DOR | 2.5 km | MPC · JPL |
| 285931 | 2001 QB_{254} | — | August 25, 2001 | Anderson Mesa | LONEOS | · | 920 m | MPC · JPL |
| 285932 | 2001 QA_{262} | — | August 25, 2001 | Socorro | LINEAR | H | 660 m | MPC · JPL |
| 285933 | 2001 QZ_{278} | — | August 19, 2001 | Socorro | LINEAR | · | 1.2 km | MPC · JPL |
| 285934 | 2001 QZ_{279} | — | August 19, 2001 | Socorro | LINEAR | · | 3.2 km | MPC · JPL |
| 285935 | 2001 QV_{281} | — | August 19, 2001 | Socorro | LINEAR | · | 4.6 km | MPC · JPL |
| 285936 | 2001 QP_{286} | — | August 17, 2001 | Palomar | NEAT | · | 1.8 km | MPC · JPL |
| 285937 Anthonytaylor | 2001 QU_{317} | Anthonytaylor | August 20, 2001 | Cerro Tololo | M. W. Buie | KOR | 1.9 km | MPC · JPL |
| 285938 | 2001 QM_{323} | — | August 27, 2001 | Palomar | NEAT | V | 880 m | MPC · JPL |
| 285939 | 2001 QE_{327} | — | August 23, 2001 | Haleakala | NEAT | · | 1.8 km | MPC · JPL |
| 285940 | 2001 QE_{330} | — | August 25, 2001 | Socorro | LINEAR | · | 1.9 km | MPC · JPL |
| 285941 | 2001 QO_{334} | — | August 27, 2001 | Kitt Peak | Spacewatch | KOR | 1.5 km | MPC · JPL |
| 285942 | 2001 QC_{335} | — | August 27, 2001 | Palomar | NEAT | · | 690 m | MPC · JPL |
| 285943 | 2001 RB_{4} | — | September 8, 2001 | Socorro | LINEAR | · | 5.2 km | MPC · JPL |
| 285944 | 2001 RZ_{11} | — | September 10, 2001 | Socorro | LINEAR | AMO +1km | 1.0 km | MPC · JPL |
| 285945 | 2001 RW_{13} | — | September 10, 2001 | Socorro | LINEAR | HYG | 3.5 km | MPC · JPL |
| 285946 | 2001 RA_{15} | — | September 10, 2001 | Socorro | LINEAR | · | 2.7 km | MPC · JPL |
| 285947 | 2001 RL_{18} | — | September 7, 2001 | Socorro | LINEAR | · | 1.7 km | MPC · JPL |
| 285948 | 2001 RA_{20} | — | September 7, 2001 | Socorro | LINEAR | · | 3.9 km | MPC · JPL |
| 285949 | 2001 RJ_{21} | — | September 7, 2001 | Socorro | LINEAR | · | 1.8 km | MPC · JPL |
| 285950 | 2001 RS_{21} | — | September 7, 2001 | Socorro | LINEAR | · | 800 m | MPC · JPL |
| 285951 | 2001 RK_{22} | — | September 7, 2001 | Socorro | LINEAR | RAF | 1.2 km | MPC · JPL |
| 285952 | 2001 RX_{22} | — | September 7, 2001 | Socorro | LINEAR | · | 2.5 km | MPC · JPL |
| 285953 | 2001 RB_{23} | — | September 7, 2001 | Socorro | LINEAR | · | 1.9 km | MPC · JPL |
| 285954 | 2001 RG_{30} | — | September 7, 2001 | Socorro | LINEAR | · | 2.3 km | MPC · JPL |
| 285955 | 2001 RE_{33} | — | September 8, 2001 | Socorro | LINEAR | · | 2.3 km | MPC · JPL |
| 285956 | 2001 RQ_{37} | — | September 8, 2001 | Socorro | LINEAR | · | 2.8 km | MPC · JPL |
| 285957 | 2001 RN_{41} | — | September 11, 2001 | Socorro | LINEAR | · | 1.8 km | MPC · JPL |
| 285958 | 2001 RD_{55} | — | September 12, 2001 | Socorro | LINEAR | · | 2.0 km | MPC · JPL |
| 285959 | 2001 RJ_{60} | — | September 12, 2001 | Socorro | LINEAR | EUN | 1.4 km | MPC · JPL |
| 285960 | 2001 RD_{64} | — | September 10, 2001 | Socorro | LINEAR | · | 1.1 km | MPC · JPL |
| 285961 | 2001 RN_{66} | — | September 10, 2001 | Socorro | LINEAR | · | 5.8 km | MPC · JPL |
| 285962 | 2001 RS_{73} | — | September 10, 2001 | Socorro | LINEAR | · | 3.9 km | MPC · JPL |
| 285963 | 2001 RD_{87} | — | September 11, 2001 | Anderson Mesa | LONEOS | · | 2.9 km | MPC · JPL |
| 285964 | 2001 RD_{95} | — | September 11, 2001 | Anderson Mesa | LONEOS | · | 880 m | MPC · JPL |
| 285965 | 2001 RS_{96} | — | September 12, 2001 | Kitt Peak | Spacewatch | KOR | 1.5 km | MPC · JPL |
| 285966 | 2001 RZ_{97} | — | September 12, 2001 | Kitt Peak | Spacewatch | · | 1.6 km | MPC · JPL |
| 285967 | 2001 RL_{99} | — | September 12, 2001 | Socorro | LINEAR | · | 1 km | MPC · JPL |
| 285968 | 2001 RY_{103} | — | September 12, 2001 | Socorro | LINEAR | · | 1.4 km | MPC · JPL |
| 285969 | 2001 RC_{105} | — | September 12, 2001 | Socorro | LINEAR | · | 4.0 km | MPC · JPL |
| 285970 | 2001 RL_{108} | — | September 12, 2001 | Socorro | LINEAR | · | 2.1 km | MPC · JPL |
| 285971 | 2001 RW_{109} | — | September 12, 2001 | Socorro | LINEAR | NYS · fast | 1.3 km | MPC · JPL |
| 285972 | 2001 RK_{111} | — | September 12, 2001 | Socorro | LINEAR | KOR | 2.3 km | MPC · JPL |
| 285973 | 2001 RS_{111} | — | September 12, 2001 | Socorro | LINEAR | · | 720 m | MPC · JPL |
| 285974 | 2001 RH_{112} | — | September 12, 2001 | Socorro | LINEAR | · | 2.2 km | MPC · JPL |
| 285975 | 2001 RP_{116} | — | September 12, 2001 | Socorro | LINEAR | · | 2.8 km | MPC · JPL |
| 285976 | 2001 RT_{116} | — | September 12, 2001 | Socorro | LINEAR | · | 1.5 km | MPC · JPL |
| 285977 | 2001 RM_{122} | — | September 12, 2001 | Socorro | LINEAR | · | 1.3 km | MPC · JPL |
| 285978 | 2001 RP_{129} | — | September 12, 2001 | Socorro | LINEAR | DOR | 4.3 km | MPC · JPL |
| 285979 | 2001 RA_{132} | — | September 12, 2001 | Socorro | LINEAR | · | 840 m | MPC · JPL |
| 285980 | 2001 RB_{140} | — | September 12, 2001 | Socorro | LINEAR | · | 2.2 km | MPC · JPL |
| 285981 | 2001 RZ_{144} | — | September 7, 2001 | Palomar | NEAT | · | 3.1 km | MPC · JPL |
| 285982 | 2001 RH_{145} | — | September 8, 2001 | Socorro | LINEAR | (5) | 1.2 km | MPC · JPL |
| 285983 | 2001 RU_{145} | — | September 8, 2001 | Socorro | LINEAR | · | 4.9 km | MPC · JPL |
| 285984 | 2001 RG_{149} | — | September 10, 2001 | Anderson Mesa | LONEOS | DOR | 3.0 km | MPC · JPL |
| 285985 | 2001 RM_{149} | — | September 10, 2001 | Anderson Mesa | LONEOS | · | 2.5 km | MPC · JPL |
| 285986 | 2001 RE_{150} | — | September 11, 2001 | Anderson Mesa | LONEOS | · | 3.7 km | MPC · JPL |
| 285987 | 2001 RH_{150} | — | September 11, 2001 | Anderson Mesa | LONEOS | · | 810 m | MPC · JPL |
| 285988 | 2001 RA_{156} | — | September 11, 2001 | Kitt Peak | Spacewatch | · | 1.5 km | MPC · JPL |
| 285989 | 2001 SG_{2} | — | September 17, 2001 | Desert Eagle | W. K. Y. Yeung | 3:2 | 6.5 km | MPC · JPL |
| 285990 | 2001 SK_{9} | — | September 17, 2001 | Socorro | LINEAR | APO +1km | 910 m | MPC · JPL |
| 285991 | 2001 SH_{15} | — | September 16, 2001 | Socorro | LINEAR | · | 3.0 km | MPC · JPL |
| 285992 | 2001 SG_{25} | — | September 16, 2001 | Socorro | LINEAR | · | 2.4 km | MPC · JPL |
| 285993 | 2001 SU_{51} | — | September 16, 2001 | Socorro | LINEAR | T_{j} (2.99) | 4.4 km | MPC · JPL |
| 285994 | 2001 SW_{59} | — | September 17, 2001 | Socorro | LINEAR | · | 1.0 km | MPC · JPL |
| 285995 | 2001 SJ_{62} | — | September 17, 2001 | Socorro | LINEAR | · | 1.1 km | MPC · JPL |
| 285996 | 2001 SH_{68} | — | September 17, 2001 | Socorro | LINEAR | · | 3.6 km | MPC · JPL |
| 285997 | 2001 SW_{76} | — | September 16, 2001 | Socorro | LINEAR | · | 2.2 km | MPC · JPL |
| 285998 | 2001 SQ_{77} | — | September 19, 2001 | Socorro | LINEAR | · | 4.8 km | MPC · JPL |
| 285999 | 2001 SJ_{84} | — | September 20, 2001 | Socorro | LINEAR | · | 1.2 km | MPC · JPL |
| 286000 | 2001 SU_{84} | — | September 20, 2001 | Socorro | LINEAR | · | 670 m | MPC · JPL |

back to top

== See also ==
- Meanings of minor-planet names: 285001–286000
