= Tony Taylor (Irish republican) =

IRA volunteer

Tony Taylor is a community activist and former Provisional IRA inmate from Northern Ireland who was sentenced to 18 years in prison in 1994 after he was seriously injured in a premature explosion in Derry. He was released under the terms of the Good Friday Agreement. In 2011 Taylor was arrested for possession of a rifle and released in 2014. Taylor was arrested two years later on the street in Derry, Northern Ireland on 10 March 2016 while on a shopping trip with his wife and children and was held for more than 2 years and 8 months in Maghaberry Prison near Lisburn in County Antrim.

Calls for Tony Taylor's release came from members of Derry City and Strabane District Council, Mayor of Derry, Maolíosa McHugh, Northern Ireland MP Elisha McCallion, and Irish Minister for Foreign Affairs and Trade, Simon Coveney. Taylor's case was also raised in the Irish Senate, the European Parliament and the Commissioner for Human Rights. The Northern Ireland Office (NIO) said that Tony Taylor's license was revoked by the Parole Commission because he posed a risk to the public, but his legal team were excluded from hearing evidence against him, which was heard in a closed session.

On 28 November 2018, Taylor was freed after 993 days of imprisonment.
