= Meanings of minor-planet names: 286001–287000 =

As minor planet discoveries are confirmed, they are given a permanent number by the IAU's Minor Planet Center (MPC), and the discoverers can then submit names for them, following the IAU's naming conventions. The list below concerns those minor planets in the specified number-range that have received names, and explains the meanings of those names.

Official naming citations of newly named small Solar System bodies are approved and published in a bulletin by IAU's Working Group for Small Bodies Nomenclature (WGSBN). Before May 2021, citations were published in MPC's Minor Planet Circulars for many decades. Recent citations can also be found on the JPL Small-Body Database (SBDB). Until his death in 2016, German astronomer Lutz D. Schmadel compiled these citations into the Dictionary of Minor Planet Names (DMP) and regularly updated the collection.

Based on Paul Herget's The Names of the Minor Planets, Schmadel also researched the unclear origin of numerous asteroids, most of which had been named prior to World War II. This article incorporates text from this source, which is in the public domain: SBDB New namings may only be added to this list below after official publication as the preannouncement of names is condemned. The WGSBN publishes a comprehensive guideline for the naming rules of non-cometary small Solar System bodies.

== 286001–286100 ==
Named minor planet	Provisional	This minor planet was named for...	Ref · Catalog
There are no named minor planets in this number range

== 286101–286200 ==
back to top

Named minor planet	Provisional	This minor planet was named for...	Ref · Catalog
286162 Tatarka	2001 TD_{259}	Dominik Tatarka (1913–1989), a Slovak writer, essayist, screenwriter and translator of French authors into Slovak	JPL · 286162
286163 Begeni	2001 TY_{260}	Peter “Begi” Begeni (b. 1974), a Slovak astronomer.	IAU · 286163

== 286201–286300 ==
back to top

Named minor planet	Provisional	This minor planet was named for...	Ref · Catalog
There are no named minor planets in this number range

== 286301–286400 ==
back to top

Named minor planet	Provisional	This minor planet was named for...	Ref · Catalog
There are no named minor planets in this number range

== 286401–286500 ==
back to top

Named minor planet	Provisional	This minor planet was named for...	Ref · Catalog
There are no named minor planets in this number range

== 286501–286600 ==
back to top

Named minor planet	Provisional	This minor planet was named for...	Ref · Catalog
There are no named minor planets in this number range

== 286601–286700 ==
back to top

Named minor planet	Provisional	This minor planet was named for...	Ref · Catalog
286693 Kodaitis	2002 FD_{14}	Bernardas Kodaitis (1879–1957), German-born Lithuanian astronomer, professor at Kaunas and Vilnius universities, who founded the astronomical observatory in Kaunas in Lithuania	JPL · 286693

== 286701–286800 ==
back to top

Named minor planet	Provisional	This minor planet was named for...	Ref · Catalog
There are no named minor planets in this number range

== 286801–286900 ==
back to top

Named minor planet	Provisional	This minor planet was named for...	Ref · Catalog
286841 Annemieke	2002 NK_{57}	Sara Annemieke Meyer (born 1976), a biologist and the wife of German discoverer Maik Meyer	JPL · 286841
286842 Joris	2002 NL_{57}	Joris Benjamin Meyer (born 2003) is the son of German discoverer Maik Meyer	JPL · 286842

== 286901–287000 ==
back to top

Named minor planet	Provisional	This minor planet was named for...	Ref · Catalog
There are no named minor planets in this number range

back to top

Preceded by 285,001–286,000	Meanings of minor-planet names List of minor planets: 286,001–287,000	Succeeded by 287,001–288,000
