= List of minor planets: 286001–287000 =

The following is a partial list of minor planets, running from minor-planet number 286001 through 287000, inclusive. The primary data for this and other partial lists is based on JPL's "Small-Body Orbital Elements" and data available from the Minor Planet Center. Critical list information is also provided by the MPC, unless otherwise specified from Lowell Observatory. A detailed description of the table's columns and additional sources are given on the main page including a complete list of every page in this series, and a statistical break-up on the dynamical classification of minor planets.

Also see the summary list of all named bodies in numerical and alphabetical order, and the corresponding naming citations for the number range of this particular list. New namings may only be added to this list after official publication, as the preannouncement of names is condemned by the Working Group for Small Bodies Nomenclature of the International Astronomical Union.

| Near-Earth obj. | MBA (inner) | MBA (outer) | Centaur |
| Mars-crosser | MBA (middle) | Jupiter trojan | Trans-Neptunian obj. |
| Unclassified |

== 286001–286100 ==
| Designation | | | Discovery | | | Properties | | Ref |
| Permanent | Provisional | Named after | Date | Site | Discoverer(s) | Category | Diam. | Ref |
|---|---|---|---|---|---|---|---|---|
| 286001 | 2001 SH_{87} | — | September 20, 2001 | Socorro | LINEAR | (31811) | 3.6 km | MPC · JPL |
| 286002 | 2001 SX_{89} | — | September 20, 2001 | Socorro | LINEAR | · | 4.6 km | MPC · JPL |
| 286003 | 2001 SY_{90} | — | September 20, 2001 | Socorro | LINEAR | EOS | 2.3 km | MPC · JPL |
| 286004 | 2001 SA_{93} | — | September 20, 2001 | Socorro | LINEAR | · | 1.2 km | MPC · JPL |
| 286005 | 2001 SC_{94} | — | September 20, 2001 | Socorro | LINEAR | · | 1.7 km | MPC · JPL |
| 286006 | 2001 SE_{97} | — | September 20, 2001 | Socorro | LINEAR | · | 1.6 km | MPC · JPL |
| 286007 | 2001 SC_{99} | — | September 20, 2001 | Socorro | LINEAR | KOR | 1.6 km | MPC · JPL |
| 286008 | 2001 SJ_{100} | — | September 20, 2001 | Socorro | LINEAR | EOS | 2.2 km | MPC · JPL |
| 286009 | 2001 SR_{101} | — | September 20, 2001 | Socorro | LINEAR | EOS | 2.4 km | MPC · JPL |
| 286010 | 2001 SC_{118} | — | September 16, 2001 | Socorro | LINEAR | · | 3.8 km | MPC · JPL |
| 286011 | 2001 SM_{118} | — | September 16, 2001 | Socorro | LINEAR | · | 990 m | MPC · JPL |
| 286012 | 2001 SY_{128} | — | September 16, 2001 | Socorro | LINEAR | · | 950 m | MPC · JPL |
| 286013 | 2001 SC_{135} | — | September 16, 2001 | Socorro | LINEAR | · | 1.7 km | MPC · JPL |
| 286014 | 2001 SE_{141} | — | September 16, 2001 | Socorro | LINEAR | THM | 2.8 km | MPC · JPL |
| 286015 | 2001 SU_{141} | — | September 16, 2001 | Socorro | LINEAR | · | 2.3 km | MPC · JPL |
| 286016 | 2001 SJ_{142} | — | September 16, 2001 | Socorro | LINEAR | · | 2.0 km | MPC · JPL |
| 286017 | 2001 SJ_{144} | — | September 16, 2001 | Socorro | LINEAR | · | 2.4 km | MPC · JPL |
| 286018 | 2001 SK_{144} | — | September 16, 2001 | Socorro | LINEAR | · | 2.7 km | MPC · JPL |
| 286019 | 2001 SA_{146} | — | September 16, 2001 | Socorro | LINEAR | · | 650 m | MPC · JPL |
| 286020 | 2001 SU_{146} | — | September 16, 2001 | Socorro | LINEAR | · | 3.6 km | MPC · JPL |
| 286021 | 2001 SD_{147} | — | September 16, 2001 | Socorro | LINEAR | · | 580 m | MPC · JPL |
| 286022 | 2001 SU_{147} | — | September 17, 2001 | Socorro | LINEAR | · | 4.1 km | MPC · JPL |
| 286023 | 2001 SK_{150} | — | September 17, 2001 | Socorro | LINEAR | · | 870 m | MPC · JPL |
| 286024 | 2001 ST_{156} | — | September 17, 2001 | Socorro | LINEAR | BRA | 1.9 km | MPC · JPL |
| 286025 | 2001 SE_{157} | — | September 17, 2001 | Socorro | LINEAR | · | 1.1 km | MPC · JPL |
| 286026 | 2001 SZ_{157} | — | September 17, 2001 | Socorro | LINEAR | · | 850 m | MPC · JPL |
| 286027 | 2001 SG_{163} | — | September 17, 2001 | Socorro | LINEAR | · | 820 m | MPC · JPL |
| 286028 | 2001 SX_{164} | — | September 17, 2001 | Socorro | LINEAR | V | 920 m | MPC · JPL |
| 286029 | 2001 SV_{166} | — | September 19, 2001 | Socorro | LINEAR | · | 750 m | MPC · JPL |
| 286030 | 2001 SB_{169} | — | September 19, 2001 | Socorro | LINEAR | TIR | 4.3 km | MPC · JPL |
| 286031 | 2001 SL_{170} | — | September 16, 2001 | Socorro | LINEAR | · | 2.4 km | MPC · JPL |
| 286032 | 2001 SO_{170} | — | September 16, 2001 | Socorro | LINEAR | · | 1.5 km | MPC · JPL |
| 286033 | 2001 SR_{175} | — | September 16, 2001 | Socorro | LINEAR | · | 940 m | MPC · JPL |
| 286034 | 2001 SU_{189} | — | September 19, 2001 | Socorro | LINEAR | · | 2.1 km | MPC · JPL |
| 286035 | 2001 SV_{189} | — | September 19, 2001 | Socorro | LINEAR | · | 4.1 km | MPC · JPL |
| 286036 | 2001 ST_{196} | — | September 19, 2001 | Socorro | LINEAR | EOS | 2.3 km | MPC · JPL |
| 286037 | 2001 SH_{198} | — | September 19, 2001 | Socorro | LINEAR | · | 1.8 km | MPC · JPL |
| 286038 | 2001 SD_{203} | — | September 19, 2001 | Socorro | LINEAR | KOR | 2.3 km | MPC · JPL |
| 286039 | 2001 SZ_{203} | — | September 19, 2001 | Socorro | LINEAR | · | 2.6 km | MPC · JPL |
| 286040 | 2001 SK_{208} | — | September 19, 2001 | Socorro | LINEAR | · | 1.1 km | MPC · JPL |
| 286041 | 2001 SE_{211} | — | September 19, 2001 | Socorro | LINEAR | · | 1.4 km | MPC · JPL |
| 286042 | 2001 SV_{211} | — | September 19, 2001 | Socorro | LINEAR | · | 2.3 km | MPC · JPL |
| 286043 | 2001 SA_{212} | — | September 19, 2001 | Socorro | LINEAR | · | 1.7 km | MPC · JPL |
| 286044 | 2001 SL_{218} | — | September 19, 2001 | Socorro | LINEAR | · | 2.6 km | MPC · JPL |
| 286045 | 2001 SM_{218} | — | September 19, 2001 | Socorro | LINEAR | · | 3.2 km | MPC · JPL |
| 286046 | 2001 SQ_{220} | — | September 19, 2001 | Socorro | LINEAR | THM | 2.3 km | MPC · JPL |
| 286047 | 2001 SP_{222} | — | September 19, 2001 | Socorro | LINEAR | · | 1.4 km | MPC · JPL |
| 286048 | 2001 SC_{227} | — | September 19, 2001 | Socorro | LINEAR | · | 810 m | MPC · JPL |
| 286049 | 2001 SK_{227} | — | September 19, 2001 | Socorro | LINEAR | · | 2.9 km | MPC · JPL |
| 286050 | 2001 SW_{228} | — | September 19, 2001 | Socorro | LINEAR | · | 2.3 km | MPC · JPL |
| 286051 | 2001 SH_{229} | — | September 19, 2001 | Socorro | LINEAR | · | 2.4 km | MPC · JPL |
| 286052 | 2001 SB_{231} | — | September 19, 2001 | Socorro | LINEAR | · | 860 m | MPC · JPL |
| 286053 | 2001 SS_{236} | — | September 19, 2001 | Socorro | LINEAR | · | 1.6 km | MPC · JPL |
| 286054 | 2001 SM_{242} | — | September 19, 2001 | Socorro | LINEAR | · | 2.1 km | MPC · JPL |
| 286055 | 2001 SM_{274} | — | September 20, 2001 | Kitt Peak | Spacewatch | · | 2.9 km | MPC · JPL |
| 286056 | 2001 SK_{282} | — | September 28, 2001 | Eskridge | G. Hug | · | 680 m | MPC · JPL |
| 286057 | 2001 SJ_{285} | — | September 22, 2001 | Kitt Peak | Spacewatch | TIR | 3.6 km | MPC · JPL |
| 286058 | 2001 SF_{288} | — | September 27, 2001 | Palomar | NEAT | · | 2.1 km | MPC · JPL |
| 286059 | 2001 SG_{292} | — | September 16, 2001 | Socorro | LINEAR | · | 2.5 km | MPC · JPL |
| 286060 | 2001 SH_{294} | — | September 20, 2001 | Socorro | LINEAR | · | 3.7 km | MPC · JPL |
| 286061 | 2001 SC_{300} | — | September 20, 2001 | Socorro | LINEAR | · | 3.3 km | MPC · JPL |
| 286062 | 2001 SP_{300} | — | September 20, 2001 | Socorro | LINEAR | · | 3.5 km | MPC · JPL |
| 286063 | 2001 SV_{302} | — | September 20, 2001 | Socorro | LINEAR | PAD | 1.7 km | MPC · JPL |
| 286064 | 2001 SX_{308} | — | September 22, 2001 | Socorro | LINEAR | V | 850 m | MPC · JPL |
| 286065 | 2001 SJ_{309} | — | September 22, 2001 | Socorro | LINEAR | · | 830 m | MPC · JPL |
| 286066 | 2001 SY_{311} | — | September 20, 2001 | Socorro | LINEAR | · | 2.7 km | MPC · JPL |
| 286067 | 2001 SB_{312} | — | September 16, 2001 | Socorro | LINEAR | · | 2.0 km | MPC · JPL |
| 286068 | 2001 SS_{315} | — | September 25, 2001 | Socorro | LINEAR | · | 930 m | MPC · JPL |
| 286069 | 2001 SS_{319} | — | September 21, 2001 | Socorro | LINEAR | · | 2.9 km | MPC · JPL |
| 286070 | 2001 SG_{326} | — | September 18, 2001 | Kitt Peak | Spacewatch | · | 2.5 km | MPC · JPL |
| 286071 | 2001 SN_{337} | — | September 20, 2001 | Kitt Peak | Spacewatch | · | 1.6 km | MPC · JPL |
| 286072 | 2001 SC_{344} | — | September 23, 2001 | Anderson Mesa | LONEOS | PHO | 1.0 km | MPC · JPL |
| 286073 | 2001 SQ_{349} | — | September 18, 2001 | Kitt Peak | Spacewatch | · | 3.2 km | MPC · JPL |
| 286074 | 2001 SL_{350} | — | September 20, 2001 | Socorro | LINEAR | · | 1.2 km | MPC · JPL |
| 286075 | 2001 SQ_{350} | — | September 26, 2001 | Desert Eagle | W. K. Y. Yeung | · | 2.6 km | MPC · JPL |
| 286076 | 2001 SO_{355} | — | September 24, 2001 | Palomar | NEAT | · | 1.2 km | MPC · JPL |
| 286077 | 2001 SX_{355} | — | March 16, 2007 | Kitt Peak | Spacewatch | · | 860 m | MPC · JPL |
| 286078 | 2001 SZ_{355} | — | September 14, 2006 | Catalina | CSS | · | 2.9 km | MPC · JPL |
| 286079 | 2001 TW_{1} | — | October 9, 2001 | Socorro | LINEAR | ATE | 490 m | MPC · JPL |
| 286080 | 2001 TX_{1} | — | October 10, 2001 | Palomar | NEAT | APO · PHA | 200 m | MPC · JPL |
| 286081 | 2001 TT_{9} | — | October 13, 2001 | Socorro | LINEAR | EOS | 3.1 km | MPC · JPL |
| 286082 | 2001 TG_{12} | — | October 13, 2001 | Socorro | LINEAR | · | 690 m | MPC · JPL |
| 286083 | 2001 TB_{17} | — | October 14, 2001 | Ondřejov | P. Pravec, P. Kušnirák | · | 1.7 km | MPC · JPL |
| 286084 | 2001 TV_{17} | — | October 14, 2001 | Desert Eagle | W. K. Y. Yeung | THB | 4.1 km | MPC · JPL |
| 286085 | 2001 TJ_{18} | — | October 14, 2001 | Desert Eagle | W. K. Y. Yeung | · | 980 m | MPC · JPL |
| 286086 | 2001 TH_{20} | — | October 9, 2001 | Socorro | LINEAR | · | 3.5 km | MPC · JPL |
| 286087 | 2001 TE_{22} | — | October 13, 2001 | Socorro | LINEAR | · | 6.9 km | MPC · JPL |
| 286088 | 2001 TT_{24} | — | October 14, 2001 | Socorro | LINEAR | · | 970 m | MPC · JPL |
| 286089 | 2001 TG_{27} | — | October 14, 2001 | Socorro | LINEAR | · | 3.6 km | MPC · JPL |
| 286090 | 2001 TY_{27} | — | October 14, 2001 | Socorro | LINEAR | slow | 1.0 km | MPC · JPL |
| 286091 | 2001 TO_{28} | — | October 14, 2001 | Socorro | LINEAR | · | 840 m | MPC · JPL |
| 286092 | 2001 TR_{31} | — | October 14, 2001 | Socorro | LINEAR | · | 1.0 km | MPC · JPL |
| 286093 | 2001 TW_{35} | — | October 14, 2001 | Socorro | LINEAR | H | 750 m | MPC · JPL |
| 286094 | 2001 TZ_{36} | — | October 14, 2001 | Socorro | LINEAR | · | 5.7 km | MPC · JPL |
| 286095 | 2001 TC_{46} | — | October 15, 2001 | Socorro | LINEAR | H | 710 m | MPC · JPL |
| 286096 | 2001 TR_{47} | — | October 14, 2001 | Cima Ekar | ADAS | EOS | 2.3 km | MPC · JPL |
| 286097 | 2001 TK_{68} | — | October 13, 2001 | Socorro | LINEAR | · | 930 m | MPC · JPL |
| 286098 | 2001 TX_{68} | — | October 13, 2001 | Socorro | LINEAR | · | 2.9 km | MPC · JPL |
| 286099 | 2001 TA_{69} | — | October 13, 2001 | Socorro | LINEAR | · | 2.8 km | MPC · JPL |
| 286100 | 2001 TL_{75} | — | October 13, 2001 | Socorro | LINEAR | · | 2.4 km | MPC · JPL |

== 286101–286200 ==
back to top

| Designation | | | Discovery | | | Properties | | Ref |
| Permanent | Provisional | Named after | Date | Site | Discoverer(s) | Category | Diam. | Ref |
|---|---|---|---|---|---|---|---|---|
| 286101 | 2001 TM_{75} | — | October 13, 2001 | Socorro | LINEAR | · | 740 m | MPC · JPL |
| 286102 | 2001 TY_{90} | — | October 14, 2001 | Socorro | LINEAR | · | 2.3 km | MPC · JPL |
| 286103 | 2001 TN_{92} | — | October 14, 2001 | Socorro | LINEAR | · | 1.9 km | MPC · JPL |
| 286104 | 2001 TP_{92} | — | October 14, 2001 | Socorro | LINEAR | · | 800 m | MPC · JPL |
| 286105 | 2001 TL_{93} | — | October 14, 2001 | Socorro | LINEAR | · | 880 m | MPC · JPL |
| 286106 | 2001 TM_{94} | — | October 14, 2001 | Socorro | LINEAR | L5 | 16 km | MPC · JPL |
| 286107 | 2001 TL_{97} | — | October 14, 2001 | Socorro | LINEAR | · | 3.1 km | MPC · JPL |
| 286108 | 2001 TY_{97} | — | October 14, 2001 | Socorro | LINEAR | · | 1.1 km | MPC · JPL |
| 286109 | 2001 TR_{98} | — | October 14, 2001 | Socorro | LINEAR | · | 770 m | MPC · JPL |
| 286110 | 2001 TQ_{99} | — | October 14, 2001 | Socorro | LINEAR | L5 | 13 km | MPC · JPL |
| 286111 | 2001 TO_{101} | — | October 15, 2001 | Socorro | LINEAR | EOS | 2.1 km | MPC · JPL |
| 286112 | 2001 TP_{101} | — | October 15, 2001 | Socorro | LINEAR | · | 1.9 km | MPC · JPL |
| 286113 | 2001 TS_{102} | — | October 15, 2001 | Socorro | LINEAR | · | 2.4 km | MPC · JPL |
| 286114 | 2001 TV_{119} | — | October 15, 2001 | Socorro | LINEAR | L5 | 17 km | MPC · JPL |
| 286115 | 2001 TB_{125} | — | October 12, 2001 | Haleakala | NEAT | · | 1.1 km | MPC · JPL |
| 286116 | 2001 TO_{126} | — | October 13, 2001 | Kitt Peak | Spacewatch | · | 2.3 km | MPC · JPL |
| 286117 | 2001 TN_{129} | — | October 15, 2001 | Kitt Peak | Spacewatch | KOR | 1.7 km | MPC · JPL |
| 286118 | 2001 TB_{132} | — | October 11, 2001 | Palomar | NEAT | (5) | 1.5 km | MPC · JPL |
| 286119 | 2001 TV_{140} | — | October 10, 2001 | Palomar | NEAT | · | 2.1 km | MPC · JPL |
| 286120 | 2001 TF_{143} | — | October 10, 2001 | Palomar | NEAT | · | 3.5 km | MPC · JPL |
| 286121 | 2001 TF_{144} | — | October 10, 2001 | Palomar | NEAT | · | 2.2 km | MPC · JPL |
| 286122 | 2001 TE_{149} | — | October 10, 2001 | Palomar | NEAT | PHO | 1.3 km | MPC · JPL |
| 286123 | 2001 TP_{149} | — | October 10, 2001 | Palomar | NEAT | · | 820 m | MPC · JPL |
| 286124 | 2001 TG_{150} | — | October 10, 2001 | Palomar | NEAT | · | 1.0 km | MPC · JPL |
| 286125 | 2001 TZ_{150} | — | October 10, 2001 | Palomar | NEAT | (2076) | 1.1 km | MPC · JPL |
| 286126 | 2001 TD_{155} | — | October 13, 2001 | Kitt Peak | Spacewatch | · | 3.4 km | MPC · JPL |
| 286127 | 2001 TE_{155} | — | October 13, 2001 | Kitt Peak | Spacewatch | EOS | 2.6 km | MPC · JPL |
| 286128 | 2001 TG_{160} | — | October 15, 2001 | Kitt Peak | Spacewatch | · | 1.6 km | MPC · JPL |
| 286129 | 2001 TB_{162} | — | October 11, 2001 | Palomar | NEAT | · | 1.3 km | MPC · JPL |
| 286130 | 2001 TY_{162} | — | October 11, 2001 | Palomar | NEAT | · | 2.8 km | MPC · JPL |
| 286131 | 2001 TD_{163} | — | October 11, 2001 | Palomar | NEAT | · | 700 m | MPC · JPL |
| 286132 | 2001 TW_{164} | — | October 15, 2001 | Palomar | NEAT | RAF | 1.2 km | MPC · JPL |
| 286133 | 2001 TK_{177} | — | October 14, 2001 | Socorro | LINEAR | · | 2.5 km | MPC · JPL |
| 286134 | 2001 TY_{178} | — | October 14, 2001 | Socorro | LINEAR | EOS | 2.3 km | MPC · JPL |
| 286135 | 2001 TD_{179} | — | October 14, 2001 | Socorro | LINEAR | · | 3.6 km | MPC · JPL |
| 286136 | 2001 TA_{182} | — | October 14, 2001 | Socorro | LINEAR | EOS | 2.7 km | MPC · JPL |
| 286137 | 2001 TR_{184} | — | October 14, 2001 | Socorro | LINEAR | · | 2.7 km | MPC · JPL |
| 286138 | 2001 TN_{188} | — | October 14, 2001 | Socorro | LINEAR | · | 2.6 km | MPC · JPL |
| 286139 | 2001 TO_{192} | — | October 14, 2001 | Socorro | LINEAR | · | 4.6 km | MPC · JPL |
| 286140 | 2001 TU_{193} | — | October 15, 2001 | Socorro | LINEAR | · | 940 m | MPC · JPL |
| 286141 | 2001 TR_{196} | — | October 15, 2001 | Palomar | NEAT | · | 3.5 km | MPC · JPL |
| 286142 | 2001 TA_{200} | — | October 11, 2001 | Socorro | LINEAR | GEF | 2.0 km | MPC · JPL |
| 286143 | 2001 TE_{201} | — | October 11, 2001 | Socorro | LINEAR | · | 2.1 km | MPC · JPL |
| 286144 | 2001 TG_{207} | — | October 11, 2001 | Palomar | NEAT | · | 700 m | MPC · JPL |
| 286145 | 2001 TJ_{207} | — | September 19, 2001 | Kitt Peak | Spacewatch | · | 1.1 km | MPC · JPL |
| 286146 | 2001 TM_{208} | — | October 11, 2001 | Palomar | NEAT | · | 1.2 km | MPC · JPL |
| 286147 | 2001 TX_{209} | — | October 13, 2001 | Palomar | NEAT | · | 2.4 km | MPC · JPL |
| 286148 | 2001 TG_{217} | — | October 14, 2001 | Ondřejov | Ondrejov | MAS | 800 m | MPC · JPL |
| 286149 | 2001 TU_{217} | — | October 14, 2001 | Socorro | LINEAR | NEM | 2.4 km | MPC · JPL |
| 286150 | 2001 TO_{220} | — | October 14, 2001 | Socorro | LINEAR | RAF | 770 m | MPC · JPL |
| 286151 | 2001 TL_{235} | — | October 15, 2001 | Haleakala | NEAT | · | 6.7 km | MPC · JPL |
| 286152 | 2001 TU_{235} | — | October 15, 2001 | Palomar | NEAT | · | 3.1 km | MPC · JPL |
| 286153 | 2001 TA_{236} | — | October 15, 2001 | Palomar | NEAT | MAR | 1.2 km | MPC · JPL |
| 286154 | 2001 TU_{240} | — | October 14, 2001 | Socorro | LINEAR | · | 4.4 km | MPC · JPL |
| 286155 | 2001 TM_{243} | — | October 14, 2001 | Apache Point | SDSS | · | 1.4 km | MPC · JPL |
| 286156 | 2001 TK_{246} | — | October 14, 2001 | Apache Point | SDSS | · | 1.1 km | MPC · JPL |
| 286157 | 2001 TD_{249} | — | October 14, 2001 | Apache Point | SDSS | (5) | 1.1 km | MPC · JPL |
| 286158 | 2001 TW_{253} | — | October 14, 2001 | Apache Point | SDSS | · | 1.6 km | MPC · JPL |
| 286159 | 2001 TN_{254} | — | October 14, 2001 | Apache Point | SDSS | · | 2.1 km | MPC · JPL |
| 286160 | 2001 TJ_{257} | — | October 10, 2001 | Palomar | NEAT | · | 1.9 km | MPC · JPL |
| 286161 | 2001 TK_{257} | — | October 10, 2001 | Palomar | NEAT | · | 2.0 km | MPC · JPL |
| 286162 Tatarka | 2001 TD_{259} | Tatarka | October 8, 2001 | Palomar | NEAT | · | 2.3 km | MPC · JPL |
| 286163 Begeni | 2001 TY_{260} | Begeni | October 11, 2001 | Palomar | NEAT | H | 610 m | MPC · JPL |
| 286164 | 2001 UQ_{3} | — | October 16, 2001 | Socorro | LINEAR | PHO | 2.1 km | MPC · JPL |
| 286165 | 2001 US_{6} | — | October 18, 2001 | Desert Eagle | W. K. Y. Yeung | · | 1.1 km | MPC · JPL |
| 286166 | 2001 UZ_{7} | — | October 17, 2001 | Socorro | LINEAR | EOS | 2.3 km | MPC · JPL |
| 286167 | 2001 UJ_{9} | — | October 17, 2001 | Socorro | LINEAR | · | 2.1 km | MPC · JPL |
| 286168 | 2001 UY_{11} | — | October 23, 2001 | Desert Eagle | W. K. Y. Yeung | · | 980 m | MPC · JPL |
| 286169 | 2001 UX_{15} | — | October 25, 2001 | Desert Eagle | W. K. Y. Yeung | · | 960 m | MPC · JPL |
| 286170 | 2001 UM_{26} | — | October 18, 2001 | Socorro | LINEAR | · | 1.8 km | MPC · JPL |
| 286171 | 2001 UY_{26} | — | October 18, 2001 | Kitt Peak | Spacewatch | · | 2.2 km | MPC · JPL |
| 286172 | 2001 UH_{27} | — | October 17, 2001 | Palomar | NEAT | EUN | 2.1 km | MPC · JPL |
| 286173 | 2001 UL_{40} | — | October 17, 2001 | Socorro | LINEAR | · | 1.6 km | MPC · JPL |
| 286174 | 2001 UM_{41} | — | October 17, 2001 | Socorro | LINEAR | MAS | 810 m | MPC · JPL |
| 286175 | 2001 UX_{41} | — | October 17, 2001 | Socorro | LINEAR | · | 3.0 km | MPC · JPL |
| 286176 | 2001 UD_{43} | — | October 17, 2001 | Socorro | LINEAR | · | 2.0 km | MPC · JPL |
| 286177 | 2001 US_{43} | — | October 17, 2001 | Socorro | LINEAR | MAS | 830 m | MPC · JPL |
| 286178 | 2001 UA_{44} | — | October 17, 2001 | Socorro | LINEAR | · | 3.8 km | MPC · JPL |
| 286179 | 2001 UP_{44} | — | October 17, 2001 | Socorro | LINEAR | · | 2.9 km | MPC · JPL |
| 286180 | 2001 UP_{46} | — | October 17, 2001 | Socorro | LINEAR | · | 820 m | MPC · JPL |
| 286181 | 2001 UA_{47} | — | October 17, 2001 | Socorro | LINEAR | · | 4.3 km | MPC · JPL |
| 286182 | 2001 UT_{49} | — | October 17, 2001 | Socorro | LINEAR | · | 930 m | MPC · JPL |
| 286183 | 2001 UQ_{50} | — | October 17, 2001 | Socorro | LINEAR | · | 3.2 km | MPC · JPL |
| 286184 | 2001 UK_{51} | — | October 17, 2001 | Socorro | LINEAR | · | 3.4 km | MPC · JPL |
| 286185 | 2001 UV_{54} | — | October 20, 2001 | Socorro | LINEAR | · | 860 m | MPC · JPL |
| 286186 | 2001 UQ_{55} | — | October 17, 2001 | Socorro | LINEAR | · | 1.4 km | MPC · JPL |
| 286187 | 2001 UT_{56} | — | October 17, 2001 | Socorro | LINEAR | · | 2.8 km | MPC · JPL |
| 286188 | 2001 UZ_{56} | — | October 17, 2001 | Socorro | LINEAR | · | 870 m | MPC · JPL |
| 286189 | 2001 US_{57} | — | October 17, 2001 | Socorro | LINEAR | · | 2.2 km | MPC · JPL |
| 286190 | 2001 UH_{61} | — | October 17, 2001 | Socorro | LINEAR | · | 790 m | MPC · JPL |
| 286191 | 2001 UC_{62} | — | October 17, 2001 | Socorro | LINEAR | · | 3.2 km | MPC · JPL |
| 286192 | 2001 UM_{62} | — | October 17, 2001 | Socorro | LINEAR | · | 870 m | MPC · JPL |
| 286193 | 2001 UG_{64} | — | October 18, 2001 | Socorro | LINEAR | · | 1.3 km | MPC · JPL |
| 286194 | 2001 UP_{64} | — | October 18, 2001 | Socorro | LINEAR | LUT | 6.9 km | MPC · JPL |
| 286195 | 2001 UV_{66} | — | October 20, 2001 | Socorro | LINEAR | · | 600 m | MPC · JPL |
| 286196 | 2001 UD_{67} | — | October 20, 2001 | Socorro | LINEAR | · | 3.5 km | MPC · JPL |
| 286197 | 2001 UT_{67} | — | October 20, 2001 | Socorro | LINEAR | · | 1.7 km | MPC · JPL |
| 286198 | 2001 UD_{68} | — | October 20, 2001 | Socorro | LINEAR | · | 970 m | MPC · JPL |
| 286199 | 2001 UM_{68} | — | October 20, 2001 | Socorro | LINEAR | · | 1.2 km | MPC · JPL |
| 286200 | 2001 UC_{69} | — | October 17, 2001 | Kitt Peak | Spacewatch | L5 | 10 km | MPC · JPL |

== 286201–286300 ==
back to top

| Designation | | | Discovery | | | Properties | | Ref |
| Permanent | Provisional | Named after | Date | Site | Discoverer(s) | Category | Diam. | Ref |
|---|---|---|---|---|---|---|---|---|
| 286201 | 2001 UK_{70} | — | October 17, 2001 | Kitt Peak | Spacewatch | · | 750 m | MPC · JPL |
| 286202 | 2001 UO_{80} | — | October 20, 2001 | Socorro | LINEAR | · | 1.7 km | MPC · JPL |
| 286203 | 2001 UF_{83} | — | October 20, 2001 | Socorro | LINEAR | NYS | 1.3 km | MPC · JPL |
| 286204 | 2001 UZ_{84} | — | October 16, 2001 | Kitt Peak | Spacewatch | · | 1.6 km | MPC · JPL |
| 286205 | 2001 UF_{85} | — | October 16, 2001 | Kitt Peak | Spacewatch | · | 1.8 km | MPC · JPL |
| 286206 | 2001 UU_{88} | — | October 16, 2001 | Palomar | NEAT | HYG | 3.4 km | MPC · JPL |
| 286207 | 2001 UH_{90} | — | October 21, 2001 | Kitt Peak | Spacewatch | NYS | 1.3 km | MPC · JPL |
| 286208 | 2001 UZ_{90} | — | October 23, 2001 | Kitt Peak | Spacewatch | HOF | 2.4 km | MPC · JPL |
| 286209 | 2001 UX_{91} | — | October 18, 2001 | Palomar | NEAT | · | 3.9 km | MPC · JPL |
| 286210 | 2001 UP_{94} | — | October 19, 2001 | Haleakala | NEAT | · | 2.3 km | MPC · JPL |
| 286211 | 2001 UR_{95} | — | October 16, 2001 | Socorro | LINEAR | · | 2.4 km | MPC · JPL |
| 286212 | 2001 UO_{97} | — | October 17, 2001 | Socorro | LINEAR | · | 3.7 km | MPC · JPL |
| 286213 | 2001 UG_{99} | — | October 17, 2001 | Socorro | LINEAR | EOS | 2.3 km | MPC · JPL |
| 286214 | 2001 UA_{102} | — | October 20, 2001 | Socorro | LINEAR | · | 2.1 km | MPC · JPL |
| 286215 | 2001 UU_{102} | — | October 20, 2001 | Socorro | LINEAR | · | 1.4 km | MPC · JPL |
| 286216 | 2001 UH_{103} | — | October 20, 2001 | Socorro | LINEAR | · | 3.8 km | MPC · JPL |
| 286217 | 2001 UP_{107} | — | October 20, 2001 | Socorro | LINEAR | · | 1.4 km | MPC · JPL |
| 286218 | 2001 UX_{107} | — | October 20, 2001 | Socorro | LINEAR | MAS | 930 m | MPC · JPL |
| 286219 | 2001 UQ_{114} | — | October 22, 2001 | Socorro | LINEAR | · | 740 m | MPC · JPL |
| 286220 | 2001 UW_{114} | — | October 22, 2001 | Socorro | LINEAR | · | 870 m | MPC · JPL |
| 286221 | 2001 UP_{117} | — | October 22, 2001 | Socorro | LINEAR | · | 5.6 km | MPC · JPL |
| 286222 | 2001 UX_{120} | — | October 22, 2001 | Socorro | LINEAR | · | 850 m | MPC · JPL |
| 286223 | 2001 UV_{124} | — | October 22, 2001 | Palomar | NEAT | · | 4.0 km | MPC · JPL |
| 286224 | 2001 UV_{131} | — | October 20, 2001 | Socorro | LINEAR | · | 1.3 km | MPC · JPL |
| 286225 | 2001 UJ_{132} | — | October 20, 2001 | Socorro | LINEAR | · | 1.9 km | MPC · JPL |
| 286226 | 2001 UY_{133} | — | October 21, 2001 | Socorro | LINEAR | · | 2.5 km | MPC · JPL |
| 286227 | 2001 UV_{140} | — | October 23, 2001 | Socorro | LINEAR | L5 | 12 km | MPC · JPL |
| 286228 | 2001 UH_{142} | — | October 23, 2001 | Socorro | LINEAR | · | 2.9 km | MPC · JPL |
| 286229 | 2001 UB_{144} | — | October 23, 2001 | Socorro | LINEAR | NYS | 1.2 km | MPC · JPL |
| 286230 | 2001 UP_{160} | — | October 23, 2001 | Socorro | LINEAR | HYG | 4.0 km | MPC · JPL |
| 286231 | 2001 UE_{164} | — | October 18, 2001 | Palomar | NEAT | · | 2.5 km | MPC · JPL |
| 286232 | 2001 UR_{167} | — | October 19, 2001 | Socorro | LINEAR | · | 2.9 km | MPC · JPL |
| 286233 | 2001 UD_{172} | — | October 18, 2001 | Palomar | NEAT | · | 2.3 km | MPC · JPL |
| 286234 | 2001 UE_{173} | — | October 18, 2001 | Palomar | NEAT | EOS | 2.1 km | MPC · JPL |
| 286235 | 2001 UD_{174} | — | October 18, 2001 | Palomar | NEAT | · | 2.2 km | MPC · JPL |
| 286236 | 2001 UN_{177} | — | October 21, 2001 | Socorro | LINEAR | · | 1.3 km | MPC · JPL |
| 286237 | 2001 UX_{185} | — | October 17, 2001 | Palomar | NEAT | · | 2.5 km | MPC · JPL |
| 286238 | 2001 UG_{193} | — | October 18, 2001 | Palomar | NEAT | · | 2.2 km | MPC · JPL |
| 286239 | 2001 UR_{193} | — | October 18, 2001 | Palomar | NEAT | EUN | 1.9 km | MPC · JPL |
| 286240 | 2001 UF_{198} | — | October 19, 2001 | Palomar | NEAT | PAD | 2.8 km | MPC · JPL |
| 286241 | 2001 UQ_{200} | — | October 19, 2001 | Palomar | NEAT | · | 790 m | MPC · JPL |
| 286242 | 2001 UL_{202} | — | October 19, 2001 | Palomar | NEAT | · | 1.9 km | MPC · JPL |
| 286243 | 2001 UQ_{203} | — | October 19, 2001 | Palomar | NEAT | · | 960 m | MPC · JPL |
| 286244 | 2001 UW_{210} | — | October 21, 2001 | Socorro | LINEAR | HYG | 3.0 km | MPC · JPL |
| 286245 | 2001 UX_{211} | — | October 21, 2001 | Socorro | LINEAR | · | 1.4 km | MPC · JPL |
| 286246 | 2001 UF_{212} | — | October 21, 2001 | Socorro | LINEAR | (5) | 1.3 km | MPC · JPL |
| 286247 | 2001 UX_{212} | — | October 21, 2001 | Kitt Peak | Spacewatch | · | 3.8 km | MPC · JPL |
| 286248 | 2001 UK_{216} | — | October 24, 2001 | Socorro | LINEAR | · | 2.4 km | MPC · JPL |
| 286249 | 2001 UP_{216} | — | October 24, 2001 | Socorro | LINEAR | · | 1.2 km | MPC · JPL |
| 286250 | 2001 UQ_{216} | — | October 24, 2001 | Socorro | LINEAR | · | 3.2 km | MPC · JPL |
| 286251 | 2001 UM_{219} | — | October 16, 2001 | Kitt Peak | Spacewatch | · | 5.0 km | MPC · JPL |
| 286252 | 2001 US_{221} | — | October 24, 2001 | Socorro | LINEAR | · | 2.0 km | MPC · JPL |
| 286253 | 2001 UZ_{222} | — | October 17, 2001 | Socorro | LINEAR | · | 2.8 km | MPC · JPL |
| 286254 | 2001 UJ_{226} | — | October 16, 2001 | Palomar | NEAT | · | 1.9 km | MPC · JPL |
| 286255 | 2001 UZ_{226} | — | October 16, 2001 | Palomar | NEAT | WIT | 1.2 km | MPC · JPL |
| 286256 | 2001 UE_{227} | — | October 16, 2001 | Palomar | NEAT | · | 2.1 km | MPC · JPL |
| 286257 | 2001 UW_{229} | — | October 16, 2001 | Palomar | NEAT | · | 890 m | MPC · JPL |
| 286258 | 2001 UB_{230} | — | October 17, 2001 | Palomar | NEAT | EOS | 2.1 km | MPC · JPL |
| 286259 | 2001 VQ_{3} | — | November 11, 2001 | Kitt Peak | Spacewatch | V | 630 m | MPC · JPL |
| 286260 | 2001 VC_{7} | — | November 9, 2001 | Socorro | LINEAR | · | 1.8 km | MPC · JPL |
| 286261 | 2001 VQ_{8} | — | November 9, 2001 | Socorro | LINEAR | · | 690 m | MPC · JPL |
| 286262 | 2001 VK_{17} | — | November 12, 2001 | Emerald Lane | L. Ball | · | 1.1 km | MPC · JPL |
| 286263 | 2001 VC_{19} | — | November 9, 2001 | Socorro | LINEAR | · | 980 m | MPC · JPL |
| 286264 | 2001 VR_{25} | — | November 9, 2001 | Socorro | LINEAR | · | 830 m | MPC · JPL |
| 286265 | 2001 VQ_{32} | — | November 9, 2001 | Socorro | LINEAR | · | 4.6 km | MPC · JPL |
| 286266 | 2001 VH_{39} | — | November 9, 2001 | Socorro | LINEAR | · | 1.1 km | MPC · JPL |
| 286267 | 2001 VH_{51} | — | November 10, 2001 | Socorro | LINEAR | · | 3.5 km | MPC · JPL |
| 286268 | 2001 VN_{51} | — | November 10, 2001 | Socorro | LINEAR | NAE | 4.6 km | MPC · JPL |
| 286269 | 2001 VG_{56} | — | November 10, 2001 | Socorro | LINEAR | · | 3.1 km | MPC · JPL |
| 286270 | 2001 VV_{68} | — | November 11, 2001 | Socorro | LINEAR | · | 2.1 km | MPC · JPL |
| 286271 | 2001 VX_{69} | — | November 11, 2001 | Socorro | LINEAR | · | 1.1 km | MPC · JPL |
| 286272 | 2001 VN_{73} | — | November 12, 2001 | Kitt Peak | Spacewatch | · | 2.4 km | MPC · JPL |
| 286273 | 2001 VA_{77} | — | November 15, 2001 | Socorro | LINEAR | slow | 1.4 km | MPC · JPL |
| 286274 | 2001 VZ_{77} | — | November 11, 2001 | Kitt Peak | Spacewatch | NYS | 1.6 km | MPC · JPL |
| 286275 | 2001 VW_{81} | — | November 12, 2001 | Socorro | LINEAR | · | 1.4 km | MPC · JPL |
| 286276 | 2001 VE_{85} | — | November 12, 2001 | Socorro | LINEAR | · | 3.8 km | MPC · JPL |
| 286277 | 2001 VF_{87} | — | November 15, 2001 | Socorro | LINEAR | H | 950 m | MPC · JPL |
| 286278 | 2001 VG_{87} | — | November 11, 2001 | Kitt Peak | Spacewatch | · | 3.0 km | MPC · JPL |
| 286279 | 2001 VM_{92} | — | November 15, 2001 | Socorro | LINEAR | · | 2.4 km | MPC · JPL |
| 286280 | 2001 VO_{100} | — | November 12, 2001 | Anderson Mesa | LONEOS | EMA | 4.3 km | MPC · JPL |
| 286281 | 2001 VR_{103} | — | November 12, 2001 | Socorro | LINEAR | · | 860 m | MPC · JPL |
| 286282 | 2001 VA_{107} | — | November 12, 2001 | Socorro | LINEAR | · | 800 m | MPC · JPL |
| 286283 | 2001 VM_{109} | — | November 12, 2001 | Socorro | LINEAR | · | 820 m | MPC · JPL |
| 286284 | 2001 VC_{111} | — | November 12, 2001 | Socorro | LINEAR | · | 2.2 km | MPC · JPL |
| 286285 | 2001 VO_{111} | — | November 12, 2001 | Socorro | LINEAR | EOS | 3.3 km | MPC · JPL |
| 286286 | 2001 VA_{116} | — | November 12, 2001 | Socorro | LINEAR | · | 4.2 km | MPC · JPL |
| 286287 | 2001 VO_{124} | — | November 9, 2001 | Socorro | LINEAR | · | 710 m | MPC · JPL |
| 286288 | 2001 VV_{125} | — | November 14, 2001 | Kitt Peak | Spacewatch | · | 4.0 km | MPC · JPL |
| 286289 | 2001 VH_{126} | — | November 14, 2001 | Kitt Peak | Spacewatch | · | 1.2 km | MPC · JPL |
| 286290 | 2001 VN_{126} | — | November 15, 2001 | Socorro | LINEAR | · | 3.1 km | MPC · JPL |
| 286291 | 2001 VP_{130} | — | November 11, 2001 | Apache Point | SDSS | · | 3.6 km | MPC · JPL |
| 286292 | 2001 VX_{133} | — | November 12, 2001 | Apache Point | SDSS | · | 1.9 km | MPC · JPL |
| 286293 | 2001 VY_{133} | — | November 12, 2001 | Apache Point | SDSS | · | 1.4 km | MPC · JPL |
| 286294 | 2001 VA_{134} | — | November 12, 2001 | Apache Point | SDSS | · | 2.8 km | MPC · JPL |
| 286295 | 2001 WJ_{8} | — | November 17, 2001 | Socorro | LINEAR | · | 740 m | MPC · JPL |
| 286296 | 2001 WB_{9} | — | November 17, 2001 | Socorro | LINEAR | · | 830 m | MPC · JPL |
| 286297 | 2001 WH_{10} | — | November 17, 2001 | Socorro | LINEAR | · | 3.9 km | MPC · JPL |
| 286298 | 2001 WO_{10} | — | November 17, 2001 | Socorro | LINEAR | · | 2.4 km | MPC · JPL |
| 286299 | 2001 WK_{11} | — | November 17, 2001 | Socorro | LINEAR | · | 1.5 km | MPC · JPL |
| 286300 | 2001 WH_{16} | — | November 17, 2001 | Socorro | LINEAR | · | 3.1 km | MPC · JPL |

== 286301–286400 ==
back to top

| Designation | | | Discovery | | | Properties | | Ref |
| Permanent | Provisional | Named after | Date | Site | Discoverer(s) | Category | Diam. | Ref |
|---|---|---|---|---|---|---|---|---|
| 286301 | 2001 WQ_{17} | — | November 17, 2001 | Socorro | LINEAR | · | 2.6 km | MPC · JPL |
| 286302 | 2001 WZ_{17} | — | November 17, 2001 | Socorro | LINEAR | · | 2.5 km | MPC · JPL |
| 286303 | 2001 WG_{18} | — | November 17, 2001 | Socorro | LINEAR | · | 840 m | MPC · JPL |
| 286304 | 2001 WA_{19} | — | November 17, 2001 | Socorro | LINEAR | NYS | 1.2 km | MPC · JPL |
| 286305 | 2001 WS_{20} | — | November 17, 2001 | Socorro | LINEAR | · | 760 m | MPC · JPL |
| 286306 | 2001 WC_{33} | — | November 17, 2001 | Socorro | LINEAR | · | 2.1 km | MPC · JPL |
| 286307 | 2001 WU_{42} | — | November 18, 2001 | Socorro | LINEAR | HYG | 3.3 km | MPC · JPL |
| 286308 | 2001 WB_{46} | — | November 19, 2001 | Socorro | LINEAR | · | 610 m | MPC · JPL |
| 286309 | 2001 WO_{52} | — | November 19, 2001 | Socorro | LINEAR | · | 4.0 km | MPC · JPL |
| 286310 | 2001 WF_{54} | — | November 19, 2001 | Socorro | LINEAR | L5 | 10 km | MPC · JPL |
| 286311 | 2001 WB_{55} | — | November 19, 2001 | Socorro | LINEAR | · | 1.0 km | MPC · JPL |
| 286312 | 2001 WR_{60} | — | November 19, 2001 | Socorro | LINEAR | · | 960 m | MPC · JPL |
| 286313 | 2001 WT_{63} | — | November 19, 2001 | Socorro | LINEAR | · | 2.6 km | MPC · JPL |
| 286314 | 2001 WV_{66} | — | November 20, 2001 | Socorro | LINEAR | · | 1.8 km | MPC · JPL |
| 286315 | 2001 WM_{67} | — | November 20, 2001 | Socorro | LINEAR | · | 1.5 km | MPC · JPL |
| 286316 | 2001 WS_{67} | — | November 20, 2001 | Socorro | LINEAR | MAS | 690 m | MPC · JPL |
| 286317 | 2001 WM_{68} | — | November 20, 2001 | Socorro | LINEAR | MAS | 820 m | MPC · JPL |
| 286318 | 2001 WA_{78} | — | November 20, 2001 | Socorro | LINEAR | · | 3.0 km | MPC · JPL |
| 286319 | 2001 WY_{78} | — | November 20, 2001 | Socorro | LINEAR | EOS | 2.7 km | MPC · JPL |
| 286320 | 2001 WK_{79} | — | November 20, 2001 | Socorro | LINEAR | · | 2.5 km | MPC · JPL |
| 286321 | 2001 WJ_{81} | — | November 20, 2001 | Socorro | LINEAR | · | 1.6 km | MPC · JPL |
| 286322 | 2001 WD_{83} | — | November 20, 2001 | Socorro | LINEAR | · | 3.7 km | MPC · JPL |
| 286323 | 2001 WC_{90} | — | November 21, 2001 | Socorro | LINEAR | · | 3.9 km | MPC · JPL |
| 286324 | 2001 WU_{93} | — | November 20, 2001 | Socorro | LINEAR | LEO | 2.0 km | MPC · JPL |
| 286325 | 2001 WY_{94} | — | November 20, 2001 | Socorro | LINEAR | · | 1.4 km | MPC · JPL |
| 286326 | 2001 WV_{99} | — | November 20, 2001 | Socorro | LINEAR | EUN | 1.5 km | MPC · JPL |
| 286327 | 2001 WJ_{101} | — | November 17, 2001 | Kitt Peak | Spacewatch | · | 810 m | MPC · JPL |
| 286328 | 2001 XX_{2} | — | December 9, 2001 | Socorro | LINEAR | PHO | 1.7 km | MPC · JPL |
| 286329 | 2001 XW_{8} | — | December 9, 2001 | Socorro | LINEAR | · | 910 m | MPC · JPL |
| 286330 | 2001 XD_{9} | — | December 9, 2001 | Socorro | LINEAR | · | 2.5 km | MPC · JPL |
| 286331 | 2001 XE_{10} | — | December 9, 2001 | Socorro | LINEAR | TIR | 4.2 km | MPC · JPL |
| 286332 | 2001 XC_{12} | — | December 9, 2001 | Socorro | LINEAR | · | 2.0 km | MPC · JPL |
| 286333 | 2001 XO_{12} | — | December 9, 2001 | Socorro | LINEAR | BRA | 1.7 km | MPC · JPL |
| 286334 | 2001 XB_{13} | — | December 9, 2001 | Socorro | LINEAR | · | 3.0 km | MPC · JPL |
| 286335 | 2001 XP_{15} | — | December 10, 2001 | Socorro | LINEAR | · | 6.8 km | MPC · JPL |
| 286336 | 2001 XW_{28} | — | December 11, 2001 | Socorro | LINEAR | · | 1.3 km | MPC · JPL |
| 286337 | 2001 XN_{32} | — | December 7, 2001 | Kitt Peak | Spacewatch | · | 2.6 km | MPC · JPL |
| 286338 | 2001 XP_{34} | — | December 9, 2001 | Socorro | LINEAR | BRA | 2.2 km | MPC · JPL |
| 286339 | 2001 XU_{40} | — | December 9, 2001 | Socorro | LINEAR | EMA | 6.8 km | MPC · JPL |
| 286340 | 2001 XS_{43} | — | December 9, 2001 | Socorro | LINEAR | · | 4.9 km | MPC · JPL |
| 286341 | 2001 XJ_{56} | — | December 10, 2001 | Socorro | LINEAR | · | 1.1 km | MPC · JPL |
| 286342 | 2001 XZ_{70} | — | December 11, 2001 | Socorro | LINEAR | · | 3.9 km | MPC · JPL |
| 286343 | 2001 XH_{82} | — | December 11, 2001 | Socorro | LINEAR | · | 2.3 km | MPC · JPL |
| 286344 | 2001 XV_{90} | — | December 10, 2001 | Socorro | LINEAR | · | 2.0 km | MPC · JPL |
| 286345 | 2001 XJ_{94} | — | December 10, 2001 | Socorro | LINEAR | · | 1.7 km | MPC · JPL |
| 286346 | 2001 XK_{94} | — | December 10, 2001 | Socorro | LINEAR | · | 5.9 km | MPC · JPL |
| 286347 | 2001 XW_{112} | — | December 11, 2001 | Socorro | LINEAR | H | 840 m | MPC · JPL |
| 286348 | 2001 XL_{123} | — | December 14, 2001 | Socorro | LINEAR | · | 2.8 km | MPC · JPL |
| 286349 | 2001 XV_{123} | — | December 14, 2001 | Socorro | LINEAR | · | 4.2 km | MPC · JPL |
| 286350 | 2001 XP_{125} | — | December 14, 2001 | Socorro | LINEAR | EOS | 2.6 km | MPC · JPL |
| 286351 | 2001 XW_{125} | — | December 14, 2001 | Socorro | LINEAR | EOS | 2.8 km | MPC · JPL |
| 286352 | 2001 XG_{129} | — | December 14, 2001 | Socorro | LINEAR | · | 2.3 km | MPC · JPL |
| 286353 | 2001 XH_{129} | — | December 14, 2001 | Socorro | LINEAR | · | 960 m | MPC · JPL |
| 286354 | 2001 XK_{130} | — | December 14, 2001 | Socorro | LINEAR | · | 920 m | MPC · JPL |
| 286355 | 2001 XR_{130} | — | December 14, 2001 | Socorro | LINEAR | · | 1.7 km | MPC · JPL |
| 286356 | 2001 XY_{131} | — | December 14, 2001 | Socorro | LINEAR | · | 970 m | MPC · JPL |
| 286357 | 2001 XU_{134} | — | December 14, 2001 | Socorro | LINEAR | · | 1.9 km | MPC · JPL |
| 286358 | 2001 XT_{135} | — | December 14, 2001 | Socorro | LINEAR | · | 2.2 km | MPC · JPL |
| 286359 | 2001 XK_{140} | — | December 14, 2001 | Socorro | LINEAR | · | 4.2 km | MPC · JPL |
| 286360 | 2001 XH_{141} | — | December 14, 2001 | Socorro | LINEAR | · | 2.5 km | MPC · JPL |
| 286361 | 2001 XJ_{144} | — | December 14, 2001 | Socorro | LINEAR | · | 910 m | MPC · JPL |
| 286362 | 2001 XZ_{144} | — | December 14, 2001 | Socorro | LINEAR | V | 810 m | MPC · JPL |
| 286363 | 2001 XB_{150} | — | December 14, 2001 | Socorro | LINEAR | · | 650 m | MPC · JPL |
| 286364 | 2001 XY_{153} | — | December 14, 2001 | Socorro | LINEAR | · | 1.6 km | MPC · JPL |
| 286365 | 2001 XU_{158} | — | December 14, 2001 | Socorro | LINEAR | NYS | 1.2 km | MPC · JPL |
| 286366 | 2001 XV_{163} | — | December 14, 2001 | Socorro | LINEAR | · | 2.7 km | MPC · JPL |
| 286367 | 2001 XJ_{164} | — | December 14, 2001 | Socorro | LINEAR | MAS | 840 m | MPC · JPL |
| 286368 | 2001 XQ_{165} | — | December 14, 2001 | Socorro | LINEAR | · | 5.1 km | MPC · JPL |
| 286369 | 2001 XU_{177} | — | December 14, 2001 | Socorro | LINEAR | · | 3.4 km | MPC · JPL |
| 286370 | 2001 XS_{195} | — | December 14, 2001 | Socorro | LINEAR | · | 1.7 km | MPC · JPL |
| 286371 | 2001 XK_{200} | — | December 15, 2001 | Socorro | LINEAR | · | 1.8 km | MPC · JPL |
| 286372 | 2001 XA_{216} | — | December 14, 2001 | Socorro | LINEAR | NYS | 1.4 km | MPC · JPL |
| 286373 | 2001 XR_{220} | — | December 15, 2001 | Socorro | LINEAR | · | 3.1 km | MPC · JPL |
| 286374 | 2001 XL_{224} | — | December 15, 2001 | Socorro | LINEAR | · | 680 m | MPC · JPL |
| 286375 | 2001 XW_{226} | — | December 15, 2001 | Socorro | LINEAR | · | 3.6 km | MPC · JPL |
| 286376 | 2001 XS_{232} | — | December 15, 2001 | Socorro | LINEAR | · | 1.3 km | MPC · JPL |
| 286377 | 2001 XE_{235} | — | December 15, 2001 | Socorro | LINEAR | · | 3.7 km | MPC · JPL |
| 286378 | 2001 XN_{243} | — | December 14, 2001 | Socorro | LINEAR | EUN | 1.6 km | MPC · JPL |
| 286379 | 2001 XD_{246} | — | December 15, 2001 | Socorro | LINEAR | · | 930 m | MPC · JPL |
| 286380 | 2001 XS_{250} | — | December 14, 2001 | Socorro | LINEAR | · | 3.0 km | MPC · JPL |
| 286381 | 2001 XB_{259} | — | December 8, 2001 | Anderson Mesa | LONEOS | BRA | 2.2 km | MPC · JPL |
| 286382 | 2001 XS_{260} | — | December 10, 2001 | Socorro | LINEAR | · | 2.1 km | MPC · JPL |
| 286383 | 2001 XH_{261} | — | December 11, 2001 | Socorro | LINEAR | · | 2.3 km | MPC · JPL |
| 286384 | 2001 XZ_{263} | — | December 14, 2001 | Palomar | NEAT | EOS | 2.5 km | MPC · JPL |
| 286385 | 2001 YM_{9} | — | December 17, 2001 | Socorro | LINEAR | · | 3.2 km | MPC · JPL |
| 286386 | 2001 YY_{9} | — | December 17, 2001 | Socorro | LINEAR | · | 900 m | MPC · JPL |
| 286387 | 2001 YZ_{9} | — | December 17, 2001 | Socorro | LINEAR | EOS | 2.6 km | MPC · JPL |
| 286388 | 2001 YT_{12} | — | December 17, 2001 | Socorro | LINEAR | KOR | 1.6 km | MPC · JPL |
| 286389 | 2001 YE_{16} | — | December 17, 2001 | Socorro | LINEAR | · | 1.9 km | MPC · JPL |
| 286390 | 2001 YO_{21} | — | December 18, 2001 | Socorro | LINEAR | · | 1.6 km | MPC · JPL |
| 286391 | 2001 YW_{21} | — | December 18, 2001 | Socorro | LINEAR | · | 3.0 km | MPC · JPL |
| 286392 | 2001 YZ_{21} | — | December 18, 2001 | Socorro | LINEAR | WIT | 1.4 km | MPC · JPL |
| 286393 | 2001 YD_{23} | — | December 18, 2001 | Socorro | LINEAR | NYS | 1.3 km | MPC · JPL |
| 286394 | 2001 YF_{23} | — | December 18, 2001 | Socorro | LINEAR | · | 910 m | MPC · JPL |
| 286395 | 2001 YA_{43} | — | December 18, 2001 | Socorro | LINEAR | · | 1.4 km | MPC · JPL |
| 286396 | 2001 YY_{49} | — | December 18, 2001 | Socorro | LINEAR | · | 1.1 km | MPC · JPL |
| 286397 | 2001 YE_{51} | — | December 18, 2001 | Socorro | LINEAR | NYS | 980 m | MPC · JPL |
| 286398 | 2001 YN_{53} | — | December 18, 2001 | Socorro | LINEAR | · | 1.0 km | MPC · JPL |
| 286399 | 2001 YZ_{53} | — | December 18, 2001 | Socorro | LINEAR | THM | 3.1 km | MPC · JPL |
| 286400 | 2001 YQ_{54} | — | December 18, 2001 | Socorro | LINEAR | VER | 3.9 km | MPC · JPL |

== 286401–286500 ==
back to top

| Designation | | | Discovery | | | Properties | | Ref |
| Permanent | Provisional | Named after | Date | Site | Discoverer(s) | Category | Diam. | Ref |
|---|---|---|---|---|---|---|---|---|
| 286401 | 2001 YB_{66} | — | December 18, 2001 | Socorro | LINEAR | EOS | 2.9 km | MPC · JPL |
| 286402 | 2001 YW_{71} | — | December 18, 2001 | Socorro | LINEAR | V | 880 m | MPC · JPL |
| 286403 | 2001 YM_{77} | — | December 18, 2001 | Socorro | LINEAR | NYS | 1.3 km | MPC · JPL |
| 286404 | 2001 YH_{83} | — | December 18, 2001 | Socorro | LINEAR | · | 900 m | MPC · JPL |
| 286405 | 2001 YP_{83} | — | December 18, 2001 | Socorro | LINEAR | · | 990 m | MPC · JPL |
| 286406 | 2001 YF_{95} | — | December 18, 2001 | Palomar | NEAT | · | 1.5 km | MPC · JPL |
| 286407 | 2001 YS_{95} | — | December 18, 2001 | Palomar | NEAT | · | 1.3 km | MPC · JPL |
| 286408 | 2001 YF_{101} | — | December 17, 2001 | Socorro | LINEAR | · | 2.1 km | MPC · JPL |
| 286409 | 2001 YN_{103} | — | December 17, 2001 | Socorro | LINEAR | · | 1.6 km | MPC · JPL |
| 286410 | 2001 YD_{104} | — | December 17, 2001 | Socorro | LINEAR | · | 1.0 km | MPC · JPL |
| 286411 | 2001 YM_{105} | — | December 17, 2001 | Socorro | LINEAR | · | 860 m | MPC · JPL |
| 286412 | 2001 YN_{110} | — | December 18, 2001 | Kitt Peak | Spacewatch | EOS | 2.6 km | MPC · JPL |
| 286413 | 2001 YE_{120} | — | December 19, 2001 | Socorro | LINEAR | · | 1.6 km | MPC · JPL |
| 286414 | 2001 YV_{126} | — | December 17, 2001 | Socorro | LINEAR | · | 1.5 km | MPC · JPL |
| 286415 | 2001 YG_{133} | — | December 21, 2001 | Socorro | LINEAR | 615 | 1.9 km | MPC · JPL |
| 286416 | 2001 YP_{138} | — | December 18, 2001 | Kitt Peak | Spacewatch | THM | 2.9 km | MPC · JPL |
| 286417 | 2001 YY_{142} | — | December 17, 2001 | Kitt Peak | Spacewatch | · | 2.7 km | MPC · JPL |
| 286418 | 2001 YH_{149} | — | December 19, 2001 | Palomar | NEAT | · | 5.0 km | MPC · JPL |
| 286419 | 2001 YQ_{149} | — | December 19, 2001 | Palomar | NEAT | · | 3.6 km | MPC · JPL |
| 286420 | 2001 YH_{150} | — | December 19, 2001 | Socorro | LINEAR | · | 3.3 km | MPC · JPL |
| 286421 | 2001 YJ_{150} | — | December 19, 2001 | Socorro | LINEAR | MAR | 1.3 km | MPC · JPL |
| 286422 | 2001 YU_{152} | — | December 19, 2001 | Palomar | NEAT | · | 3.5 km | MPC · JPL |
| 286423 | 2001 YT_{154} | — | December 19, 2001 | Socorro | LINEAR | T_{j} (2.94) | 6.3 km | MPC · JPL |
| 286424 | 2001 YQ_{156} | — | December 20, 2001 | Palomar | NEAT | · | 3.7 km | MPC · JPL |
| 286425 | 2001 YZ_{156} | — | December 18, 2001 | Socorro | LINEAR | · | 850 m | MPC · JPL |
| 286426 | 2001 YE_{160} | — | December 18, 2001 | Apache Point | SDSS | · | 3.7 km | MPC · JPL |
| 286427 | 2001 YC_{162} | — | December 20, 2001 | Apache Point | SDSS | PHO | 1.1 km | MPC · JPL |
| 286428 | 2001 YD_{162} | — | December 18, 2001 | Palomar | NEAT | EOS | 2.8 km | MPC · JPL |
| 286429 | 2002 AK_{6} | — | January 5, 2002 | Kitt Peak | Spacewatch | · | 1.2 km | MPC · JPL |
| 286430 | 2002 AS_{7} | — | January 4, 2002 | Palomar | NEAT | · | 3.3 km | MPC · JPL |
| 286431 | 2002 AQ_{12} | — | January 10, 2002 | Campo Imperatore | CINEOS | · | 1.4 km | MPC · JPL |
| 286432 | 2002 AG_{13} | — | January 11, 2002 | Campo Imperatore | CINEOS | · | 3.6 km | MPC · JPL |
| 286433 | 2002 AL_{17} | — | January 9, 2002 | Socorro | LINEAR | H | 810 m | MPC · JPL |
| 286434 | 2002 AM_{19} | — | January 8, 2002 | Socorro | LINEAR | · | 710 m | MPC · JPL |
| 286435 | 2002 AF_{23} | — | January 5, 2002 | Haleakala | NEAT | DOR | 3.4 km | MPC · JPL |
| 286436 | 2002 AO_{29} | — | January 8, 2002 | Socorro | LINEAR | · | 5.1 km | MPC · JPL |
| 286437 | 2002 AN_{30} | — | January 9, 2002 | Socorro | LINEAR | NYS | 1.2 km | MPC · JPL |
| 286438 | 2002 AS_{39} | — | January 9, 2002 | Socorro | LINEAR | · | 1.4 km | MPC · JPL |
| 286439 | 2002 AG_{40} | — | January 9, 2002 | Socorro | LINEAR | · | 4.7 km | MPC · JPL |
| 286440 | 2002 AA_{42} | — | January 9, 2002 | Socorro | LINEAR | · | 3.3 km | MPC · JPL |
| 286441 | 2002 AG_{43} | — | January 9, 2002 | Socorro | LINEAR | VER | 3.7 km | MPC · JPL |
| 286442 | 2002 AY_{47} | — | January 9, 2002 | Socorro | LINEAR | · | 1.6 km | MPC · JPL |
| 286443 | 2002 AS_{49} | — | January 9, 2002 | Socorro | LINEAR | MAS | 860 m | MPC · JPL |
| 286444 | 2002 AD_{52} | — | January 9, 2002 | Socorro | LINEAR | · | 2.9 km | MPC · JPL |
| 286445 | 2002 AK_{62} | — | January 11, 2002 | Socorro | LINEAR | · | 4.6 km | MPC · JPL |
| 286446 | 2002 AC_{67} | — | January 9, 2002 | Campo Imperatore | CINEOS | · | 3.5 km | MPC · JPL |
| 286447 | 2002 AE_{71} | — | January 8, 2002 | Socorro | LINEAR | · | 6.4 km | MPC · JPL |
| 286448 | 2002 AA_{72} | — | January 8, 2002 | Socorro | LINEAR | · | 880 m | MPC · JPL |
| 286449 | 2002 AV_{72} | — | January 8, 2002 | Socorro | LINEAR | · | 2.7 km | MPC · JPL |
| 286450 | 2002 AJ_{73} | — | January 8, 2002 | Socorro | LINEAR | · | 1.8 km | MPC · JPL |
| 286451 | 2002 AW_{75} | — | January 8, 2002 | Socorro | LINEAR | · | 2.4 km | MPC · JPL |
| 286452 | 2002 AR_{78} | — | January 8, 2002 | Socorro | LINEAR | · | 1.6 km | MPC · JPL |
| 286453 | 2002 AO_{82} | — | January 9, 2002 | Socorro | LINEAR | · | 4.1 km | MPC · JPL |
| 286454 | 2002 AP_{88} | — | January 9, 2002 | Socorro | LINEAR | V | 930 m | MPC · JPL |
| 286455 | 2002 AA_{94} | — | January 8, 2002 | Socorro | LINEAR | · | 4.4 km | MPC · JPL |
| 286456 | 2002 AJ_{97} | — | January 8, 2002 | Socorro | LINEAR | NYS | 1.4 km | MPC · JPL |
| 286457 | 2002 AZ_{98} | — | January 8, 2002 | Socorro | LINEAR | · | 4.3 km | MPC · JPL |
| 286458 | 2002 AA_{102} | — | January 8, 2002 | Socorro | LINEAR | HOF | 3.6 km | MPC · JPL |
| 286459 | 2002 AA_{111} | — | January 9, 2002 | Socorro | LINEAR | · | 6.4 km | MPC · JPL |
| 286460 | 2002 AJ_{111} | — | January 9, 2002 | Socorro | LINEAR | · | 1.0 km | MPC · JPL |
| 286461 | 2002 AN_{112} | — | January 9, 2002 | Socorro | LINEAR | · | 2.4 km | MPC · JPL |
| 286462 | 2002 AE_{128} | — | January 13, 2002 | Socorro | LINEAR | · | 2.1 km | MPC · JPL |
| 286463 | 2002 AP_{131} | — | January 14, 2002 | Socorro | LINEAR | H | 830 m | MPC · JPL |
| 286464 | 2002 AE_{136} | — | January 9, 2002 | Socorro | LINEAR | · | 1.6 km | MPC · JPL |
| 286465 | 2002 AO_{136} | — | January 9, 2002 | Socorro | LINEAR | · | 1.9 km | MPC · JPL |
| 286466 | 2002 AP_{137} | — | January 9, 2002 | Socorro | LINEAR | · | 1.3 km | MPC · JPL |
| 286467 | 2002 AR_{138} | — | January 9, 2002 | Socorro | LINEAR | · | 2.2 km | MPC · JPL |
| 286468 | 2002 AM_{144} | — | January 13, 2002 | Socorro | LINEAR | · | 3.8 km | MPC · JPL |
| 286469 | 2002 AN_{144} | — | January 13, 2002 | Socorro | LINEAR | EOS | 4.0 km | MPC · JPL |
| 286470 | 2002 AV_{145} | — | January 13, 2002 | Socorro | LINEAR | · | 1.4 km | MPC · JPL |
| 286471 | 2002 AZ_{147} | — | January 13, 2002 | Palomar | NEAT | · | 3.3 km | MPC · JPL |
| 286472 | 2002 AQ_{149} | — | January 14, 2002 | Socorro | LINEAR | · | 5.7 km | MPC · JPL |
| 286473 | 2002 AJ_{150} | — | January 14, 2002 | Socorro | LINEAR | · | 3.3 km | MPC · JPL |
| 286474 | 2002 AN_{150} | — | January 14, 2002 | Socorro | LINEAR | MRX | 1.2 km | MPC · JPL |
| 286475 | 2002 AC_{152} | — | January 14, 2002 | Socorro | LINEAR | · | 3.9 km | MPC · JPL |
| 286476 | 2002 AO_{159} | — | January 13, 2002 | Socorro | LINEAR | · | 3.9 km | MPC · JPL |
| 286477 | 2002 AV_{167} | — | January 13, 2002 | Socorro | LINEAR | · | 4.8 km | MPC · JPL |
| 286478 | 2002 AD_{168} | — | January 14, 2002 | Socorro | LINEAR | V | 860 m | MPC · JPL |
| 286479 | 2002 AJ_{169} | — | January 14, 2002 | Socorro | LINEAR | · | 1.2 km | MPC · JPL |
| 286480 | 2002 AF_{171} | — | January 14, 2002 | Socorro | LINEAR | · | 2.6 km | MPC · JPL |
| 286481 | 2002 AD_{175} | — | January 14, 2002 | Socorro | LINEAR | · | 1.6 km | MPC · JPL |
| 286482 | 2002 AZ_{175} | — | January 14, 2002 | Socorro | LINEAR | MAS | 930 m | MPC · JPL |
| 286483 | 2002 AL_{181} | — | January 5, 2002 | Palomar | NEAT | · | 4.4 km | MPC · JPL |
| 286484 | 2002 AE_{185} | — | January 8, 2002 | Palomar | NEAT | · | 3.7 km | MPC · JPL |
| 286485 | 2002 AY_{188} | — | January 10, 2002 | Palomar | NEAT | · | 4.8 km | MPC · JPL |
| 286486 | 2002 AR_{192} | — | January 12, 2002 | Kitt Peak | Spacewatch | · | 1.3 km | MPC · JPL |
| 286487 | 2002 AR_{196} | — | January 13, 2002 | Socorro | LINEAR | · | 1.1 km | MPC · JPL |
| 286488 | 2002 AO_{200} | — | January 9, 2002 | Socorro | LINEAR | EUN | 1.8 km | MPC · JPL |
| 286489 | 2002 AC_{202} | — | January 10, 2002 | Palomar | NEAT | · | 1.5 km | MPC · JPL |
| 286490 | 2002 AJ_{206} | — | January 13, 2002 | Apache Point | SDSS | slow | 2.5 km | MPC · JPL |
| 286491 | 2002 AK_{206} | — | January 13, 2002 | Apache Point | SDSS | · | 4.9 km | MPC · JPL |
| 286492 | 2002 AM_{209} | — | January 8, 2002 | Apache Point | SDSS | · | 2.1 km | MPC · JPL |
| 286493 | 2002 AN_{209} | — | January 9, 2002 | Apache Point | SDSS | · | 3.1 km | MPC · JPL |
| 286494 | 2002 AP_{209} | — | January 14, 2002 | Kitt Peak | Spacewatch | · | 2.2 km | MPC · JPL |
| 286495 | 2002 BW_{17} | — | January 21, 2002 | Socorro | LINEAR | · | 1.8 km | MPC · JPL |
| 286496 | 2002 BL_{20} | — | January 21, 2002 | Socorro | LINEAR | H | 680 m | MPC · JPL |
| 286497 | 2002 BQ_{24} | — | January 23, 2002 | Socorro | LINEAR | · | 1.1 km | MPC · JPL |
| 286498 | 2002 BY_{24} | — | January 23, 2002 | Socorro | LINEAR | · | 760 m | MPC · JPL |
| 286499 | 2002 BF_{27} | — | January 18, 2002 | Socorro | LINEAR | · | 3.5 km | MPC · JPL |
| 286500 | 2002 BQ_{28} | — | January 19, 2002 | Anderson Mesa | LONEOS | · | 1.5 km | MPC · JPL |

== 286501–286600 ==
back to top

| Designation | | | Discovery | | | Properties | | Ref |
| Permanent | Provisional | Named after | Date | Site | Discoverer(s) | Category | Diam. | Ref |
|---|---|---|---|---|---|---|---|---|
| 286501 | 2002 BB_{31} | — | January 19, 2002 | Socorro | LINEAR | · | 970 m | MPC · JPL |
| 286502 | 2002 BJ_{31} | — | January 22, 2002 | Socorro | LINEAR | · | 4.8 km | MPC · JPL |
| 286503 | 2002 BH_{32} | — | January 22, 2002 | Kitt Peak | Spacewatch | · | 2.7 km | MPC · JPL |
| 286504 | 2002 CM_{9} | — | February 6, 2002 | Kitt Peak | Spacewatch | · | 1.9 km | MPC · JPL |
| 286505 | 2002 CQ_{9} | — | February 6, 2002 | Socorro | LINEAR | PHO | 1.1 km | MPC · JPL |
| 286506 | 2002 CL_{14} | — | February 7, 2002 | Socorro | LINEAR | H | 820 m | MPC · JPL |
| 286507 | 2002 CW_{14} | — | February 9, 2002 | Desert Eagle | W. K. Y. Yeung | · | 750 m | MPC · JPL |
| 286508 | 2002 CZ_{18} | — | February 6, 2002 | Socorro | LINEAR | · | 3.5 km | MPC · JPL |
| 286509 | 2002 CG_{23} | — | February 5, 2002 | Haleakala | NEAT | · | 1.6 km | MPC · JPL |
| 286510 | 2002 CX_{24} | — | February 7, 2002 | Kitt Peak | Spacewatch | · | 4.7 km | MPC · JPL |
| 286511 | 2002 CT_{25} | — | February 10, 2002 | Socorro | LINEAR | H | 770 m | MPC · JPL |
| 286512 | 2002 CG_{29} | — | February 6, 2002 | Socorro | LINEAR | HOF | 4.0 km | MPC · JPL |
| 286513 | 2002 CX_{29} | — | February 6, 2002 | Socorro | LINEAR | · | 2.7 km | MPC · JPL |
| 286514 | 2002 CG_{30} | — | February 6, 2002 | Socorro | LINEAR | · | 880 m | MPC · JPL |
| 286515 | 2002 CY_{31} | — | February 6, 2002 | Socorro | LINEAR | · | 1.1 km | MPC · JPL |
| 286516 | 2002 CC_{36} | — | February 7, 2002 | Socorro | LINEAR | · | 1.1 km | MPC · JPL |
| 286517 | 2002 CX_{37} | — | February 7, 2002 | Socorro | LINEAR | · | 3.1 km | MPC · JPL |
| 286518 | 2002 CA_{41} | — | February 7, 2002 | Palomar | NEAT | · | 3.6 km | MPC · JPL |
| 286519 | 2002 CB_{46} | — | February 8, 2002 | Palomar | NEAT | · | 2.7 km | MPC · JPL |
| 286520 | 2002 CL_{57} | — | February 7, 2002 | Socorro | LINEAR | TIR | 4.2 km | MPC · JPL |
| 286521 | 2002 CL_{67} | — | February 7, 2002 | Socorro | LINEAR | · | 3.7 km | MPC · JPL |
| 286522 | 2002 CZ_{67} | — | February 7, 2002 | Socorro | LINEAR | V | 830 m | MPC · JPL |
| 286523 | 2002 CA_{71} | — | February 7, 2002 | Socorro | LINEAR | · | 1.1 km | MPC · JPL |
| 286524 | 2002 CJ_{71} | — | February 7, 2002 | Socorro | LINEAR | V | 930 m | MPC · JPL |
| 286525 | 2002 CE_{72} | — | February 7, 2002 | Socorro | LINEAR | MAS | 810 m | MPC · JPL |
| 286526 | 2002 CO_{75} | — | February 7, 2002 | Socorro | LINEAR | · | 5.1 km | MPC · JPL |
| 286527 | 2002 CU_{75} | — | February 7, 2002 | Socorro | LINEAR | · | 3.6 km | MPC · JPL |
| 286528 | 2002 CG_{76} | — | February 7, 2002 | Socorro | LINEAR | · | 5.0 km | MPC · JPL |
| 286529 | 2002 CQ_{82} | — | February 7, 2002 | Socorro | LINEAR | EOS | 2.9 km | MPC · JPL |
| 286530 | 2002 CZ_{85} | — | February 7, 2002 | Socorro | LINEAR | · | 1.1 km | MPC · JPL |
| 286531 | 2002 CB_{87} | — | February 7, 2002 | Socorro | LINEAR | NYS | 1.1 km | MPC · JPL |
| 286532 | 2002 CM_{87} | — | February 7, 2002 | Socorro | LINEAR | · | 1.3 km | MPC · JPL |
| 286533 | 2002 CA_{88} | — | February 7, 2002 | Socorro | LINEAR | · | 1.9 km | MPC · JPL |
| 286534 | 2002 CZ_{88} | — | February 7, 2002 | Socorro | LINEAR | · | 1.1 km | MPC · JPL |
| 286535 | 2002 CU_{98} | — | February 7, 2002 | Socorro | LINEAR | · | 1.8 km | MPC · JPL |
| 286536 | 2002 CQ_{109} | — | February 7, 2002 | Socorro | LINEAR | · | 1.0 km | MPC · JPL |
| 286537 | 2002 CU_{109} | — | February 7, 2002 | Socorro | LINEAR | HYG | 3.6 km | MPC · JPL |
| 286538 | 2002 CQ_{120} | — | February 7, 2002 | Socorro | LINEAR | · | 1.1 km | MPC · JPL |
| 286539 | 2002 CT_{122} | — | February 7, 2002 | Socorro | LINEAR | · | 880 m | MPC · JPL |
| 286540 | 2002 CJ_{123} | — | February 7, 2002 | Socorro | LINEAR | · | 3.4 km | MPC · JPL |
| 286541 | 2002 CA_{143} | — | February 9, 2002 | Socorro | LINEAR | · | 1.7 km | MPC · JPL |
| 286542 | 2002 CY_{143} | — | February 9, 2002 | Socorro | LINEAR | NYS | 1.7 km | MPC · JPL |
| 286543 | 2002 CC_{144} | — | February 9, 2002 | Socorro | LINEAR | · | 1.4 km | MPC · JPL |
| 286544 | 2002 CM_{153} | — | February 8, 2002 | Kitt Peak | Spacewatch | THM | 2.6 km | MPC · JPL |
| 286545 | 2002 CA_{155} | — | February 6, 2002 | Socorro | LINEAR | · | 4.7 km | MPC · JPL |
| 286546 | 2002 CP_{156} | — | February 7, 2002 | Socorro | LINEAR | · | 1.4 km | MPC · JPL |
| 286547 | 2002 CN_{157} | — | February 7, 2002 | Socorro | LINEAR | · | 2.2 km | MPC · JPL |
| 286548 | 2002 CP_{158} | — | February 7, 2002 | Socorro | LINEAR | L4 | 10 km | MPC · JPL |
| 286549 | 2002 CE_{159} | — | February 7, 2002 | Socorro | LINEAR | MAS | 960 m | MPC · JPL |
| 286550 | 2002 CW_{169} | — | February 8, 2002 | Socorro | LINEAR | · | 1.2 km | MPC · JPL |
| 286551 | 2002 CC_{173} | — | February 8, 2002 | Socorro | LINEAR | V | 960 m | MPC · JPL |
| 286552 | 2002 CL_{176} | — | February 10, 2002 | Socorro | LINEAR | · | 950 m | MPC · JPL |
| 286553 | 2002 CQ_{176} | — | February 10, 2002 | Socorro | LINEAR | · | 3.7 km | MPC · JPL |
| 286554 | 2002 CK_{178} | — | February 10, 2002 | Socorro | LINEAR | · | 1.0 km | MPC · JPL |
| 286555 | 2002 CN_{181} | — | February 10, 2002 | Socorro | LINEAR | · | 1.6 km | MPC · JPL |
| 286556 | 2002 CB_{183} | — | February 10, 2002 | Socorro | LINEAR | · | 2.3 km | MPC · JPL |
| 286557 | 2002 CR_{183} | — | February 10, 2002 | Socorro | LINEAR | NYS | 990 m | MPC · JPL |
| 286558 | 2002 CM_{184} | — | February 10, 2002 | Socorro | LINEAR | · | 2.6 km | MPC · JPL |
| 286559 | 2002 CN_{185} | — | February 10, 2002 | Socorro | LINEAR | · | 1.2 km | MPC · JPL |
| 286560 | 2002 CO_{185} | — | February 10, 2002 | Socorro | LINEAR | NYS | 1.4 km | MPC · JPL |
| 286561 | 2002 CP_{186} | — | February 10, 2002 | Socorro | LINEAR | · | 720 m | MPC · JPL |
| 286562 | 2002 CW_{186} | — | February 10, 2002 | Socorro | LINEAR | · | 3.2 km | MPC · JPL |
| 286563 | 2002 CH_{190} | — | February 10, 2002 | Socorro | LINEAR | · | 2.8 km | MPC · JPL |
| 286564 | 2002 CK_{196} | — | February 10, 2002 | Socorro | LINEAR | · | 1.4 km | MPC · JPL |
| 286565 | 2002 CL_{198} | — | February 10, 2002 | Socorro | LINEAR | MAS | 820 m | MPC · JPL |
| 286566 | 2002 CA_{201} | — | February 10, 2002 | Socorro | LINEAR | · | 2.7 km | MPC · JPL |
| 286567 | 2002 CN_{205} | — | February 10, 2002 | Socorro | LINEAR | · | 4.8 km | MPC · JPL |
| 286568 | 2002 CP_{205} | — | February 10, 2002 | Socorro | LINEAR | EOS | 2.5 km | MPC · JPL |
| 286569 | 2002 CE_{206} | — | February 10, 2002 | Socorro | LINEAR | · | 1.0 km | MPC · JPL |
| 286570 | 2002 CR_{206} | — | February 10, 2002 | Socorro | LINEAR | · | 1.5 km | MPC · JPL |
| 286571 | 2002 CR_{207} | — | February 10, 2002 | Socorro | LINEAR | L4 | 10 km | MPC · JPL |
| 286572 | 2002 CX_{207} | — | February 10, 2002 | Socorro | LINEAR | BRG | 2.4 km | MPC · JPL |
| 286573 | 2002 CF_{208} | — | February 10, 2002 | Socorro | LINEAR | · | 1.4 km | MPC · JPL |
| 286574 | 2002 CS_{209} | — | February 10, 2002 | Socorro | LINEAR | · | 2.5 km | MPC · JPL |
| 286575 | 2002 CF_{211} | — | February 10, 2002 | Socorro | LINEAR | L4 | 11 km | MPC · JPL |
| 286576 | 2002 CS_{211} | — | February 10, 2002 | Socorro | LINEAR | MAS | 940 m | MPC · JPL |
| 286577 | 2002 CX_{211} | — | February 10, 2002 | Socorro | LINEAR | KOR | 1.5 km | MPC · JPL |
| 286578 | 2002 CH_{221} | — | February 10, 2002 | Socorro | LINEAR | · | 4.0 km | MPC · JPL |
| 286579 | 2002 CA_{224} | — | February 11, 2002 | Socorro | LINEAR | V | 960 m | MPC · JPL |
| 286580 | 2002 CG_{224} | — | February 11, 2002 | Socorro | LINEAR | · | 3.5 km | MPC · JPL |
| 286581 | 2002 CK_{224} | — | February 11, 2002 | Socorro | LINEAR | NYS | 1.6 km | MPC · JPL |
| 286582 | 2002 CC_{226} | — | February 3, 2002 | Haleakala | NEAT | EOS | 2.8 km | MPC · JPL |
| 286583 | 2002 CE_{228} | — | February 6, 2002 | Palomar | NEAT | · | 3.3 km | MPC · JPL |
| 286584 | 2002 CN_{234} | — | February 8, 2002 | Kitt Peak | Spacewatch | · | 830 m | MPC · JPL |
| 286585 | 2002 CE_{253} | — | February 3, 2002 | Palomar | NEAT | · | 3.1 km | MPC · JPL |
| 286586 | 2002 CP_{253} | — | February 4, 2002 | Anderson Mesa | LONEOS | · | 2.8 km | MPC · JPL |
| 286587 | 2002 CF_{260} | — | February 7, 2002 | Palomar | NEAT | · | 3.0 km | MPC · JPL |
| 286588 | 2002 CD_{263} | — | February 6, 2002 | Socorro | LINEAR | · | 3.3 km | MPC · JPL |
| 286589 | 2002 CF_{263} | — | February 6, 2002 | Socorro | LINEAR | · | 4.8 km | MPC · JPL |
| 286590 | 2002 CS_{263} | — | February 7, 2002 | Palomar | NEAT | · | 2.6 km | MPC · JPL |
| 286591 | 2002 CD_{265} | — | February 6, 2002 | Kitt Peak | Spacewatch | · | 1.1 km | MPC · JPL |
| 286592 | 2002 CV_{270} | — | February 8, 2002 | Kitt Peak | Spacewatch | · | 3.3 km | MPC · JPL |
| 286593 | 2002 CL_{273} | — | February 8, 2002 | Kitt Peak | M. W. Buie | · | 1.2 km | MPC · JPL |
| 286594 | 2002 CJ_{275} | — | February 9, 2002 | Kvistaberg | Uppsala-DLR Asteroid Survey | · | 2.1 km | MPC · JPL |
| 286595 | 2002 CU_{280} | — | February 8, 2002 | Kitt Peak | M. W. Buie | · | 1.1 km | MPC · JPL |
| 286596 | 2002 CZ_{291} | — | February 11, 2002 | Socorro | LINEAR | · | 4.2 km | MPC · JPL |
| 286597 | 2002 CU_{296} | — | February 10, 2002 | Socorro | LINEAR | · | 1.5 km | MPC · JPL |
| 286598 | 2002 CF_{303} | — | February 13, 2002 | Kitt Peak | Spacewatch | · | 1.2 km | MPC · JPL |
| 286599 | 2002 CM_{303} | — | February 13, 2002 | Socorro | LINEAR | · | 4.5 km | MPC · JPL |
| 286600 | 2002 CD_{304} | — | February 13, 2002 | Kitt Peak | Spacewatch | MAS | 960 m | MPC · JPL |

== 286601–286700 ==
back to top

| Designation | | | Discovery | | | Properties | | Ref |
| Permanent | Provisional | Named after | Date | Site | Discoverer(s) | Category | Diam. | Ref |
|---|---|---|---|---|---|---|---|---|
| 286601 | 2002 CW_{310} | — | February 8, 2002 | Kitt Peak | Spacewatch | MAS | 800 m | MPC · JPL |
| 286602 | 2002 CZ_{310} | — | February 10, 2002 | Socorro | LINEAR | · | 1.2 km | MPC · JPL |
| 286603 | 2002 CJ_{313} | — | February 5, 2002 | Palomar | NEAT | · | 2.1 km | MPC · JPL |
| 286604 | 2002 CC_{316} | — | February 14, 2002 | Kitt Peak | Spacewatch | HOF | 2.8 km | MPC · JPL |
| 286605 | 2002 CE_{316} | — | February 14, 2002 | Kitt Peak | Spacewatch | · | 2.4 km | MPC · JPL |
| 286606 | 2002 DV | — | February 16, 2002 | Bohyunsan | Jeon, Y.-B., Lee, B.-C. | · | 4.5 km | MPC · JPL |
| 286607 | 2002 DU_{1} | — | February 19, 2002 | Socorro | LINEAR | H | 840 m | MPC · JPL |
| 286608 | 2002 DU_{2} | — | February 20, 2002 | Socorro | LINEAR | H | 740 m | MPC · JPL |
| 286609 | 2002 DJ_{6} | — | February 20, 2002 | Kitt Peak | Spacewatch | · | 3.6 km | MPC · JPL |
| 286610 | 2002 DM_{6} | — | February 20, 2002 | Kitt Peak | Spacewatch | · | 730 m | MPC · JPL |
| 286611 | 2002 DV_{8} | — | February 19, 2002 | Socorro | LINEAR | EUP | 4.4 km | MPC · JPL |
| 286612 | 2002 DL_{10} | — | February 20, 2002 | Socorro | LINEAR | (5) | 1.5 km | MPC · JPL |
| 286613 | 2002 DG_{12} | — | February 21, 2002 | Palomar | NEAT | · | 3.9 km | MPC · JPL |
| 286614 | 2002 DL_{13} | — | February 16, 2002 | Palomar | NEAT | · | 1.5 km | MPC · JPL |
| 286615 | 2002 DC_{15} | — | February 16, 2002 | Palomar | NEAT | (5) | 1.9 km | MPC · JPL |
| 286616 | 2002 DP_{17} | — | February 19, 2002 | Kitt Peak | Spacewatch | · | 720 m | MPC · JPL |
| 286617 | 2002 DL_{20} | — | February 16, 2002 | Palomar | NEAT | L4 | 8.4 km | MPC · JPL |
| 286618 | 2002 EB_{1} | — | March 5, 2002 | Socorro | LINEAR | EUP | 5.7 km | MPC · JPL |
| 286619 | 2002 ES_{1} | — | March 5, 2002 | Socorro | LINEAR | · | 6.5 km | MPC · JPL |
| 286620 | 2002 ET_{1} | — | March 6, 2002 | Socorro | LINEAR | H | 830 m | MPC · JPL |
| 286621 | 2002 EX_{1} | — | March 8, 2002 | Ametlla de Mar | J. Nomen | · | 1.1 km | MPC · JPL |
| 286622 | 2002 EW_{3} | — | March 10, 2002 | Cima Ekar | ADAS | · | 890 m | MPC · JPL |
| 286623 | 2002 ET_{12} | — | March 15, 2002 | Socorro | LINEAR | H | 790 m | MPC · JPL |
| 286624 | 2002 ER_{13} | — | March 4, 2002 | Palomar | NEAT | ERI | 2.3 km | MPC · JPL |
| 286625 | 2002 EF_{14} | — | March 5, 2002 | Palomar | NEAT | · | 1.8 km | MPC · JPL |
| 286626 | 2002 EV_{14} | — | March 5, 2002 | Kitt Peak | Spacewatch | · | 1.8 km | MPC · JPL |
| 286627 | 2002 EZ_{17} | — | March 9, 2002 | Kitt Peak | Spacewatch | · | 1.8 km | MPC · JPL |
| 286628 | 2002 EG_{18} | — | March 9, 2002 | Kitt Peak | Spacewatch | SUL | 2.6 km | MPC · JPL |
| 286629 | 2002 ET_{21} | — | March 10, 2002 | Haleakala | NEAT | · | 1.1 km | MPC · JPL |
| 286630 | 2002 EG_{23} | — | March 5, 2002 | Kitt Peak | Spacewatch | AGN | 1.6 km | MPC · JPL |
| 286631 | 2002 EZ_{26} | — | March 10, 2002 | Kitt Peak | Spacewatch | L4 | 9.8 km | MPC · JPL |
| 286632 | 2002 EL_{34} | — | March 11, 2002 | Palomar | NEAT | · | 2.9 km | MPC · JPL |
| 286633 | 2002 ER_{35} | — | March 9, 2002 | Kitt Peak | Spacewatch | NYS | 1.3 km | MPC · JPL |
| 286634 | 2002 EB_{37} | — | March 9, 2002 | Kitt Peak | Spacewatch | · | 870 m | MPC · JPL |
| 286635 | 2002 EX_{37} | — | March 9, 2002 | Kitt Peak | Spacewatch | · | 3.0 km | MPC · JPL |
| 286636 | 2002 ER_{41} | — | March 12, 2002 | Socorro | LINEAR | · | 5.0 km | MPC · JPL |
| 286637 | 2002 EH_{44} | — | March 13, 2002 | Socorro | LINEAR | · | 1.0 km | MPC · JPL |
| 286638 | 2002 EU_{46} | — | March 11, 2002 | Palomar | NEAT | · | 1.6 km | MPC · JPL |
| 286639 | 2002 ED_{47} | — | March 12, 2002 | Palomar | NEAT | · | 1.1 km | MPC · JPL |
| 286640 | 2002 EO_{47} | — | March 12, 2002 | Palomar | NEAT | · | 1.1 km | MPC · JPL |
| 286641 | 2002 ES_{47} | — | March 12, 2002 | Palomar | NEAT | · | 1.2 km | MPC · JPL |
| 286642 | 2002 EQ_{48} | — | March 12, 2002 | Palomar | NEAT | · | 960 m | MPC · JPL |
| 286643 | 2002 EE_{55} | — | March 12, 2002 | Socorro | LINEAR | · | 2.0 km | MPC · JPL |
| 286644 | 2002 EB_{56} | — | March 13, 2002 | Socorro | LINEAR | · | 910 m | MPC · JPL |
| 286645 | 2002 ED_{59} | — | March 13, 2002 | Socorro | LINEAR | V | 910 m | MPC · JPL |
| 286646 | 2002 EC_{64} | — | March 13, 2002 | Socorro | LINEAR | · | 1.7 km | MPC · JPL |
| 286647 | 2002 EJ_{65} | — | March 13, 2002 | Socorro | LINEAR | · | 960 m | MPC · JPL |
| 286648 | 2002 ER_{66} | — | March 13, 2002 | Socorro | LINEAR | · | 800 m | MPC · JPL |
| 286649 | 2002 EC_{68} | — | March 13, 2002 | Socorro | LINEAR | · | 780 m | MPC · JPL |
| 286650 | 2002 EY_{68} | — | March 13, 2002 | Socorro | LINEAR | · | 1.5 km | MPC · JPL |
| 286651 | 2002 EG_{70} | — | March 13, 2002 | Socorro | LINEAR | NYS | 1.2 km | MPC · JPL |
| 286652 | 2002 EM_{70} | — | March 13, 2002 | Socorro | LINEAR | · | 1.5 km | MPC · JPL |
| 286653 | 2002 EZ_{72} | — | March 13, 2002 | Socorro | LINEAR | · | 1.6 km | MPC · JPL |
| 286654 | 2002 ER_{85} | — | March 9, 2002 | Socorro | LINEAR | · | 1.6 km | MPC · JPL |
| 286655 | 2002 EY_{91} | — | March 13, 2002 | Socorro | LINEAR | · | 780 m | MPC · JPL |
| 286656 | 2002 ES_{93} | — | March 14, 2002 | Socorro | LINEAR | · | 2.2 km | MPC · JPL |
| 286657 | 2002 EV_{93} | — | March 14, 2002 | Socorro | LINEAR | · | 7.0 km | MPC · JPL |
| 286658 | 2002 EV_{94} | — | March 14, 2002 | Socorro | LINEAR | · | 1.4 km | MPC · JPL |
| 286659 | 2002 EL_{99} | — | March 4, 2002 | Anderson Mesa | LONEOS | · | 4.3 km | MPC · JPL |
| 286660 | 2002 ET_{101} | — | March 6, 2002 | Socorro | LINEAR | · | 900 m | MPC · JPL |
| 286661 | 2002 EY_{101} | — | March 6, 2002 | Socorro | LINEAR | · | 2.5 km | MPC · JPL |
| 286662 | 2002 ES_{103} | — | March 9, 2002 | Kitt Peak | Spacewatch | NEM | 2.3 km | MPC · JPL |
| 286663 | 2002 EE_{105} | — | March 9, 2002 | Anderson Mesa | LONEOS | · | 3.0 km | MPC · JPL |
| 286664 | 2002 EN_{105} | — | March 9, 2002 | Kitt Peak | Spacewatch | · | 980 m | MPC · JPL |
| 286665 | 2002 EG_{111} | — | March 9, 2002 | Anderson Mesa | LONEOS | · | 2.1 km | MPC · JPL |
| 286666 | 2002 EU_{117} | — | March 10, 2002 | Kitt Peak | Spacewatch | · | 3.8 km | MPC · JPL |
| 286667 | 2002 EQ_{120} | — | March 11, 2002 | Kitt Peak | Spacewatch | · | 2.2 km | MPC · JPL |
| 286668 | 2002 ES_{120} | — | March 11, 2002 | Kitt Peak | Spacewatch | · | 1.9 km | MPC · JPL |
| 286669 | 2002 EK_{123} | — | March 12, 2002 | Palomar | NEAT | NYS | 1.2 km | MPC · JPL |
| 286670 | 2002 EY_{128} | — | March 13, 2002 | Palomar | NEAT | H | 660 m | MPC · JPL |
| 286671 | 2002 EU_{129} | — | March 11, 2002 | Kitt Peak | Spacewatch | · | 2.6 km | MPC · JPL |
| 286672 | 2002 ES_{137} | — | March 12, 2002 | Palomar | NEAT | · | 2.5 km | MPC · JPL |
| 286673 | 2002 EV_{138} | — | March 12, 2002 | Palomar | NEAT | MAS | 860 m | MPC · JPL |
| 286674 | 2002 EA_{142} | — | March 12, 2002 | Palomar | NEAT | · | 1.1 km | MPC · JPL |
| 286675 | 2002 EG_{143} | — | March 12, 2002 | Palomar | NEAT | · | 1.5 km | MPC · JPL |
| 286676 | 2002 EE_{145} | — | March 13, 2002 | Socorro | LINEAR | · | 2.3 km | MPC · JPL |
| 286677 | 2002 EJ_{145} | — | March 13, 2002 | Socorro | LINEAR | · | 850 m | MPC · JPL |
| 286678 | 2002 EG_{147} | — | March 14, 2002 | Palomar | NEAT | EOS | 3.3 km | MPC · JPL |
| 286679 | 2002 EK_{147} | — | March 15, 2002 | Palomar | NEAT | V | 640 m | MPC · JPL |
| 286680 | 2002 EV_{147} | — | March 15, 2002 | Palomar | NEAT | · | 1.2 km | MPC · JPL |
| 286681 | 2002 EX_{147} | — | March 15, 2002 | Palomar | NEAT | · | 1.2 km | MPC · JPL |
| 286682 | 2002 EP_{157} | — | March 13, 2002 | Palomar | NEAT | TEL | 1.7 km | MPC · JPL |
| 286683 | 2002 EU_{157} | — | March 13, 2002 | Palomar | NEAT | · | 4.4 km | MPC · JPL |
| 286684 | 2002 EC_{158} | — | March 5, 2002 | Apache Point | SDSS | L4 | 8.6 km | MPC · JPL |
| 286685 | 2002 EP_{160} | — | March 13, 2002 | Palomar | NEAT | L4 | 10 km | MPC · JPL |
| 286686 | 2002 FB_{2} | — | March 19, 2002 | Desert Eagle | W. K. Y. Yeung | · | 1.6 km | MPC · JPL |
| 286687 | 2002 FW_{3} | — | March 20, 2002 | Desert Eagle | W. K. Y. Yeung | BRA | 2.4 km | MPC · JPL |
| 286688 | 2002 FB_{7} | — | March 22, 2002 | Palomar | NEAT | · | 2.5 km | MPC · JPL |
| 286689 | 2002 FK_{11} | — | March 16, 2002 | Socorro | LINEAR | MAS | 900 m | MPC · JPL |
| 286690 | 2002 FJ_{12} | — | March 16, 2002 | Socorro | LINEAR | · | 3.3 km | MPC · JPL |
| 286691 | 2002 FW_{13} | — | March 16, 2002 | Haleakala | NEAT | · | 1.7 km | MPC · JPL |
| 286692 | 2002 FA_{14} | — | March 18, 2002 | Kitt Peak | Spacewatch | TIR | 3.5 km | MPC · JPL |
| 286693 Kodaitis | 2002 FD_{14} | Kodaitis | March 16, 2002 | Moletai | K. Černis, Zdanavicius, J. | · | 4.2 km | MPC · JPL |
| 286694 | 2002 FH_{16} | — | March 16, 2002 | Haleakala | NEAT | · | 3.9 km | MPC · JPL |
| 286695 | 2002 FL_{17} | — | March 18, 2002 | Kitt Peak | M. W. Buie | · | 2.4 km | MPC · JPL |
| 286696 | 2002 FC_{25} | — | March 19, 2002 | Anderson Mesa | LONEOS | EOS | 2.8 km | MPC · JPL |
| 286697 | 2002 FM_{29} | — | March 20, 2002 | Socorro | LINEAR | BRA | 2.6 km | MPC · JPL |
| 286698 | 2002 FD_{37} | — | March 23, 2002 | Socorro | LINEAR | · | 6.5 km | MPC · JPL |
| 286699 | 2002 FV_{41} | — | March 19, 2002 | Haleakala | NEAT | · | 3.2 km | MPC · JPL |
| 286700 | 2002 GH | — | April 2, 2002 | Palomar | NEAT | · | 2.7 km | MPC · JPL |

== 286701–286800 ==
back to top

| Designation | | | Discovery | | | Properties | | Ref |
| Permanent | Provisional | Named after | Date | Site | Discoverer(s) | Category | Diam. | Ref |
|---|---|---|---|---|---|---|---|---|
| 286701 | 2002 GP_{15} | — | April 15, 2002 | Socorro | LINEAR | · | 4.4 km | MPC · JPL |
| 286702 | 2002 GP_{28} | — | April 6, 2002 | Cerro Tololo | M. W. Buie | NYS | 1.4 km | MPC · JPL |
| 286703 | 2002 GJ_{31} | — | April 7, 2002 | Cerro Tololo | M. W. Buie | NYS | 1.5 km | MPC · JPL |
| 286704 | 2002 GF_{37} | — | April 2, 2002 | Palomar | NEAT | · | 1.6 km | MPC · JPL |
| 286705 | 2002 GZ_{43} | — | April 4, 2002 | Palomar | NEAT | T_{j} (2.99) | 4.0 km | MPC · JPL |
| 286706 | 2002 GM_{48} | — | April 4, 2002 | Haleakala | NEAT | · | 5.4 km | MPC · JPL |
| 286707 | 2002 GK_{49} | — | April 5, 2002 | Anderson Mesa | LONEOS | · | 1.7 km | MPC · JPL |
| 286708 | 2002 GM_{49} | — | April 5, 2002 | Palomar | NEAT | · | 3.0 km | MPC · JPL |
| 286709 | 2002 GG_{61} | — | April 8, 2002 | Palomar | NEAT | MAS | 960 m | MPC · JPL |
| 286710 | 2002 GY_{67} | — | April 8, 2002 | Palomar | NEAT | · | 1.8 km | MPC · JPL |
| 286711 | 2002 GY_{68} | — | April 8, 2002 | Palomar | NEAT | · | 3.1 km | MPC · JPL |
| 286712 | 2002 GW_{72} | — | April 9, 2002 | Anderson Mesa | LONEOS | · | 940 m | MPC · JPL |
| 286713 | 2002 GM_{78} | — | April 9, 2002 | Socorro | LINEAR | EUN | 1.7 km | MPC · JPL |
| 286714 | 2002 GO_{79} | — | April 10, 2002 | Palomar | NEAT | TIR | 3.9 km | MPC · JPL |
| 286715 | 2002 GQ_{80} | — | April 10, 2002 | Socorro | LINEAR | · | 880 m | MPC · JPL |
| 286716 | 2002 GT_{81} | — | April 10, 2002 | Socorro | LINEAR | · | 2.4 km | MPC · JPL |
| 286717 | 2002 GL_{87} | — | April 10, 2002 | Socorro | LINEAR | · | 2.1 km | MPC · JPL |
| 286718 | 2002 GL_{92} | — | April 9, 2002 | Palomar | NEAT | · | 1.3 km | MPC · JPL |
| 286719 | 2002 GD_{93} | — | April 9, 2002 | Socorro | LINEAR | · | 2.2 km | MPC · JPL |
| 286720 | 2002 GH_{96} | — | April 9, 2002 | Socorro | LINEAR | · | 3.4 km | MPC · JPL |
| 286721 | 2002 GM_{104} | — | April 10, 2002 | Socorro | LINEAR | · | 2.0 km | MPC · JPL |
| 286722 | 2002 GZ_{106} | — | April 11, 2002 | Anderson Mesa | LONEOS | EOS | 2.9 km | MPC · JPL |
| 286723 | 2002 GP_{110} | — | April 10, 2002 | Socorro | LINEAR | · | 1.4 km | MPC · JPL |
| 286724 | 2002 GY_{111} | — | April 10, 2002 | Socorro | LINEAR | · | 3.9 km | MPC · JPL |
| 286725 | 2002 GW_{112} | — | April 10, 2002 | Socorro | LINEAR | · | 2.3 km | MPC · JPL |
| 286726 | 2002 GR_{115} | — | April 11, 2002 | Socorro | LINEAR | · | 1.8 km | MPC · JPL |
| 286727 | 2002 GC_{116} | — | April 11, 2002 | Socorro | LINEAR | · | 1.9 km | MPC · JPL |
| 286728 | 2002 GM_{116} | — | April 11, 2002 | Socorro | LINEAR | HYG | 3.7 km | MPC · JPL |
| 286729 | 2002 GX_{118} | — | April 12, 2002 | Palomar | NEAT | · | 840 m | MPC · JPL |
| 286730 | 2002 GZ_{118} | — | April 12, 2002 | Palomar | NEAT | · | 1.7 km | MPC · JPL |
| 286731 | 2002 GW_{119} | — | April 12, 2002 | Palomar | NEAT | EOS | 3.0 km | MPC · JPL |
| 286732 | 2002 GY_{119} | — | April 12, 2002 | Palomar | NEAT | · | 3.2 km | MPC · JPL |
| 286733 | 2002 GM_{124} | — | April 12, 2002 | Kitt Peak | Spacewatch | MAS | 990 m | MPC · JPL |
| 286734 | 2002 GZ_{124} | — | April 12, 2002 | Socorro | LINEAR | · | 1.4 km | MPC · JPL |
| 286735 | 2002 GS_{129} | — | April 12, 2002 | Socorro | LINEAR | · | 1.6 km | MPC · JPL |
| 286736 | 2002 GD_{130} | — | April 12, 2002 | Socorro | LINEAR | · | 1.1 km | MPC · JPL |
| 286737 | 2002 GN_{130} | — | April 12, 2002 | Socorro | LINEAR | · | 1.5 km | MPC · JPL |
| 286738 | 2002 GE_{135} | — | April 12, 2002 | Socorro | LINEAR | · | 2.5 km | MPC · JPL |
| 286739 | 2002 GX_{135} | — | April 12, 2002 | Socorro | LINEAR | · | 4.0 km | MPC · JPL |
| 286740 | 2002 GZ_{135} | — | April 12, 2002 | Socorro | LINEAR | · | 1.4 km | MPC · JPL |
| 286741 | 2002 GU_{138} | — | April 13, 2002 | Palomar | NEAT | · | 2.3 km | MPC · JPL |
| 286742 | 2002 GT_{141} | — | April 13, 2002 | Palomar | NEAT | · | 970 m | MPC · JPL |
| 286743 | 2002 GW_{143} | — | April 13, 2002 | Kitt Peak | Spacewatch | · | 4.1 km | MPC · JPL |
| 286744 | 2002 GH_{145} | — | April 12, 2002 | Socorro | LINEAR | · | 830 m | MPC · JPL |
| 286745 | 2002 GA_{149} | — | April 14, 2002 | Palomar | NEAT | · | 880 m | MPC · JPL |
| 286746 | 2002 GU_{150} | — | April 14, 2002 | Socorro | LINEAR | LIX | 4.1 km | MPC · JPL |
| 286747 | 2002 GV_{152} | — | April 12, 2002 | Palomar | NEAT | · | 2.6 km | MPC · JPL |
| 286748 | 2002 GW_{163} | — | April 14, 2002 | Palomar | NEAT | NYS | 1.3 km | MPC · JPL |
| 286749 | 2002 GK_{171} | — | April 10, 2002 | Socorro | LINEAR | · | 860 m | MPC · JPL |
| 286750 | 2002 GU_{171} | — | April 10, 2002 | Socorro | LINEAR | · | 1.1 km | MPC · JPL |
| 286751 | 2002 GH_{173} | — | April 10, 2002 | Socorro | LINEAR | · | 3.1 km | MPC · JPL |
| 286752 | 2002 GM_{180} | — | April 5, 2002 | Palomar | NEAT | · | 3.8 km | MPC · JPL |
| 286753 | 2002 GY_{182} | — | April 4, 2002 | Palomar | NEAT | · | 1.8 km | MPC · JPL |
| 286754 | 2002 GA_{183} | — | April 5, 2002 | Palomar | NEAT | · | 1.2 km | MPC · JPL |
| 286755 | 2002 GB_{183} | — | April 11, 2002 | Palomar | NEAT | H | 930 m | MPC · JPL |
| 286756 | 2002 GD_{183} | — | April 12, 2002 | Palomar | NEAT | · | 3.5 km | MPC · JPL |
| 286757 | 2002 GG_{186} | — | April 13, 2002 | Palomar | NEAT | · | 1.6 km | MPC · JPL |
| 286758 | 2002 GT_{186} | — | April 8, 2002 | Palomar | NEAT | EUN | 1.0 km | MPC · JPL |
| 286759 | 2002 GA_{188} | — | April 2, 2002 | Palomar | NEAT | · | 3.5 km | MPC · JPL |
| 286760 | 2002 GS_{188} | — | April 9, 2002 | Palomar | NEAT | · | 3.3 km | MPC · JPL |
| 286761 | 2002 GO_{189} | — | February 5, 2006 | Mount Lemmon | Mount Lemmon Survey | · | 2.3 km | MPC · JPL |
| 286762 | 2002 HU_{4} | — | April 16, 2002 | Emerald Lane | L. Ball | · | 1.8 km | MPC · JPL |
| 286763 | 2002 HG_{10} | — | April 17, 2002 | Socorro | LINEAR | · | 1.7 km | MPC · JPL |
| 286764 | 2002 HH_{13} | — | April 22, 2002 | Socorro | LINEAR | H | 810 m | MPC · JPL |
| 286765 | 2002 HP_{15} | — | April 17, 2002 | Socorro | LINEAR | V | 800 m | MPC · JPL |
| 286766 | 2002 HF_{17} | — | April 19, 2002 | Kitt Peak | Spacewatch | MAS | 900 m | MPC · JPL |
| 286767 | 2002 JC_{3} | — | May 4, 2002 | Kitt Peak | Spacewatch | · | 1.7 km | MPC · JPL |
| 286768 | 2002 JO_{11} | — | May 4, 2002 | Anderson Mesa | LONEOS | · | 1.2 km | MPC · JPL |
| 286769 | 2002 JS_{14} | — | May 8, 2002 | Socorro | LINEAR | · | 1.4 km | MPC · JPL |
| 286770 | 2002 JM_{17} | — | May 7, 2002 | Palomar | NEAT | · | 780 m | MPC · JPL |
| 286771 | 2002 JF_{23} | — | May 8, 2002 | Socorro | LINEAR | · | 2.0 km | MPC · JPL |
| 286772 | 2002 JN_{33} | — | May 9, 2002 | Socorro | LINEAR | · | 3.9 km | MPC · JPL |
| 286773 | 2002 JE_{50} | — | May 9, 2002 | Socorro | LINEAR | · | 1.2 km | MPC · JPL |
| 286774 | 2002 JQ_{57} | — | May 9, 2002 | Socorro | LINEAR | · | 1.9 km | MPC · JPL |
| 286775 | 2002 JZ_{60} | — | May 11, 2002 | Kitt Peak | Spacewatch | V | 730 m | MPC · JPL |
| 286776 | 2002 JY_{65} | — | May 9, 2002 | Socorro | LINEAR | MAS | 1.1 km | MPC · JPL |
| 286777 | 2002 JV_{68} | — | May 6, 2002 | Socorro | LINEAR | · | 1.7 km | MPC · JPL |
| 286778 | 2002 JA_{71} | — | May 8, 2002 | Socorro | LINEAR | · | 1.1 km | MPC · JPL |
| 286779 | 2002 JD_{80} | — | May 11, 2002 | Socorro | LINEAR | · | 2.1 km | MPC · JPL |
| 286780 | 2002 JH_{83} | — | May 11, 2002 | Socorro | LINEAR | · | 970 m | MPC · JPL |
| 286781 | 2002 JG_{84} | — | May 11, 2002 | Socorro | LINEAR | · | 800 m | MPC · JPL |
| 286782 | 2002 JU_{84} | — | May 11, 2002 | Socorro | LINEAR | · | 1.2 km | MPC · JPL |
| 286783 | 2002 JF_{86} | — | May 11, 2002 | Socorro | LINEAR | · | 4.1 km | MPC · JPL |
| 286784 | 2002 JN_{86} | — | May 11, 2002 | Socorro | LINEAR | · | 2.2 km | MPC · JPL |
| 286785 | 2002 JN_{87} | — | May 11, 2002 | Socorro | LINEAR | · | 710 m | MPC · JPL |
| 286786 | 2002 JE_{89} | — | May 11, 2002 | Socorro | LINEAR | · | 1.0 km | MPC · JPL |
| 286787 | 2002 JL_{91} | — | May 11, 2002 | Socorro | LINEAR | EOS | 2.8 km | MPC · JPL |
| 286788 | 2002 JK_{93} | — | May 11, 2002 | Socorro | LINEAR | EOS | 2.9 km | MPC · JPL |
| 286789 | 2002 JT_{93} | — | May 11, 2002 | Socorro | LINEAR | · | 1.7 km | MPC · JPL |
| 286790 | 2002 JB_{97} | — | May 12, 2002 | Palomar | NEAT | · | 2.6 km | MPC · JPL |
| 286791 | 2002 JU_{98} | — | May 8, 2002 | Anderson Mesa | LONEOS | · | 960 m | MPC · JPL |
| 286792 | 2002 JE_{106} | — | May 14, 2002 | Socorro | LINEAR | · | 1.8 km | MPC · JPL |
| 286793 | 2002 JH_{106} | — | May 15, 2002 | Socorro | LINEAR | · | 1.4 km | MPC · JPL |
| 286794 | 2002 JY_{123} | — | May 6, 2002 | Palomar | NEAT | · | 850 m | MPC · JPL |
| 286795 | 2002 JT_{126} | — | May 7, 2002 | Anderson Mesa | LONEOS | · | 2.2 km | MPC · JPL |
| 286796 | 2002 JM_{129} | — | May 8, 2002 | Socorro | LINEAR | · | 760 m | MPC · JPL |
| 286797 | 2002 JB_{130} | — | May 8, 2002 | Socorro | LINEAR | · | 1.3 km | MPC · JPL |
| 286798 | 2002 JD_{130} | — | May 8, 2002 | Socorro | LINEAR | JUN | 1.1 km | MPC · JPL |
| 286799 | 2002 JO_{132} | — | May 9, 2002 | Palomar | NEAT | V | 740 m | MPC · JPL |
| 286800 | 2002 JQ_{133} | — | May 9, 2002 | Socorro | LINEAR | · | 5.7 km | MPC · JPL |

== 286801–286900 ==
back to top

| Designation | | | Discovery | | | Properties | | Ref |
| Permanent | Provisional | Named after | Date | Site | Discoverer(s) | Category | Diam. | Ref |
|---|---|---|---|---|---|---|---|---|
| 286801 | 2002 JC_{134} | — | May 9, 2002 | Palomar | NEAT | · | 2.1 km | MPC · JPL |
| 286802 | 2002 JV_{135} | — | May 9, 2002 | Palomar | NEAT | · | 1.9 km | MPC · JPL |
| 286803 | 2002 JS_{139} | — | May 10, 2002 | Palomar | NEAT | · | 1.4 km | MPC · JPL |
| 286804 | 2002 JW_{146} | — | May 6, 2002 | Palomar | NEAT | · | 5.0 km | MPC · JPL |
| 286805 | 2002 JH_{149} | — | May 12, 2002 | Palomar | NEAT | · | 2.1 km | MPC · JPL |
| 286806 | 2002 JS_{149} | — | May 10, 2002 | Palomar | NEAT | EOS | 2.0 km | MPC · JPL |
| 286807 | 2002 JF_{150} | — | May 4, 2002 | Palomar | NEAT | H | 930 m | MPC · JPL |
| 286808 | 2002 KR_{1} | — | May 17, 2002 | Palomar | NEAT | · | 2.9 km | MPC · JPL |
| 286809 | 2002 KB_{3} | — | May 18, 2002 | Palomar | NEAT | · | 2.2 km | MPC · JPL |
| 286810 | 2002 KA_{4} | — | May 21, 2002 | Socorro | LINEAR | BAR | 1.6 km | MPC · JPL |
| 286811 | 2002 KH_{9} | — | May 22, 2002 | Socorro | LINEAR | · | 620 m | MPC · JPL |
| 286812 | 2002 LP_{18} | — | June 6, 2002 | Socorro | LINEAR | · | 2.7 km | MPC · JPL |
| 286813 | 2002 LX_{27} | — | June 9, 2002 | Socorro | LINEAR | · | 1.5 km | MPC · JPL |
| 286814 | 2002 LV_{28} | — | June 9, 2002 | Socorro | LINEAR | · | 1.7 km | MPC · JPL |
| 286815 | 2002 LH_{30} | — | June 1, 2002 | Palomar | NEAT | JUN | 1.3 km | MPC · JPL |
| 286816 | 2002 LG_{34} | — | June 10, 2002 | Socorro | LINEAR | (116763) | 2.8 km | MPC · JPL |
| 286817 | 2002 LP_{35} | — | June 9, 2002 | Socorro | LINEAR | ERI | 1.9 km | MPC · JPL |
| 286818 | 2002 LU_{45} | — | June 7, 2002 | Kitt Peak | Spacewatch | · | 1.1 km | MPC · JPL |
| 286819 | 2002 LC_{50} | — | June 8, 2002 | Socorro | LINEAR | · | 3.2 km | MPC · JPL |
| 286820 | 2002 LS_{59} | — | June 7, 2002 | Socorro | LINEAR | · | 2.8 km | MPC · JPL |
| 286821 | 2002 LH_{61} | — | June 12, 2002 | Palomar | NEAT | · | 4.9 km | MPC · JPL |
| 286822 | 2002 LN_{61} | — | June 1, 2002 | Palomar | NEAT | · | 2.2 km | MPC · JPL |
| 286823 | 2002 LC_{62} | — | June 14, 2002 | Socorro | LINEAR | · | 1.5 km | MPC · JPL |
| 286824 | 2002 LE_{62} | — | June 8, 2002 | Socorro | LINEAR | · | 1.8 km | MPC · JPL |
| 286825 | 2002 MX_{4} | — | June 24, 2002 | Palomar | NEAT | · | 2.1 km | MPC · JPL |
| 286826 | 2002 MJ_{5} | — | June 16, 2002 | Palomar | NEAT | · | 1.5 km | MPC · JPL |
| 286827 | 2002 MP_{5} | — | June 20, 2002 | Palomar | NEAT | · | 2.8 km | MPC · JPL |
| 286828 | 2002 MZ_{5} | — | June 23, 2002 | Palomar | NEAT | · | 2.3 km | MPC · JPL |
| 286829 | 2002 MB_{6} | — | June 27, 2002 | Palomar | NEAT | · | 2.9 km | MPC · JPL |
| 286830 | 2002 NA | — | July 1, 2002 | Palomar | NEAT | PHO | 1.6 km | MPC · JPL |
| 286831 | 2002 NH_{10} | — | July 4, 2002 | Palomar | NEAT | · | 2.6 km | MPC · JPL |
| 286832 | 2002 NU_{11} | — | July 4, 2002 | Kitt Peak | Spacewatch | · | 2.8 km | MPC · JPL |
| 286833 | 2002 NZ_{11} | — | July 4, 2002 | Palomar | NEAT | (5) | 2.0 km | MPC · JPL |
| 286834 | 2002 NO_{14} | — | July 4, 2002 | Palomar | NEAT | · | 2.1 km | MPC · JPL |
| 286835 | 2002 NL_{38} | — | July 9, 2002 | Socorro | LINEAR | · | 1.6 km | MPC · JPL |
| 286836 | 2002 NX_{38} | — | July 11, 2002 | Socorro | LINEAR | EUN | 2.2 km | MPC · JPL |
| 286837 | 2002 NH_{50} | — | July 14, 2002 | Palomar | NEAT | · | 1.9 km | MPC · JPL |
| 286838 | 2002 NJ_{50} | — | July 14, 2002 | Palomar | NEAT | · | 1.4 km | MPC · JPL |
| 286839 | 2002 NF_{53} | — | July 14, 2002 | Palomar | NEAT | JUN | 1.7 km | MPC · JPL |
| 286840 | 2002 NN_{54} | — | July 5, 2002 | Socorro | LINEAR | RAF | 1.6 km | MPC · JPL |
| 286841 Annemieke | 2002 NK_{57} | Annemieke | July 3, 2002 | Palomar | M. Meyer | · | 3.5 km | MPC · JPL |
| 286842 Joris | 2002 NL_{57} | Joris | July 3, 2002 | Palomar | M. Meyer | · | 3.0 km | MPC · JPL |
| 286843 | 2002 NU_{58} | — | July 12, 2002 | Palomar | NEAT | EOS | 2.6 km | MPC · JPL |
| 286844 | 2002 NT_{59} | — | July 8, 2002 | Palomar | NEAT | · | 1.3 km | MPC · JPL |
| 286845 | 2002 NE_{60} | — | July 15, 2002 | Palomar | NEAT | TEL | 3.9 km | MPC · JPL |
| 286846 | 2002 NL_{61} | — | July 5, 2002 | Socorro | LINEAR | · | 3.6 km | MPC · JPL |
| 286847 | 2002 NC_{62} | — | July 5, 2002 | Palomar | NEAT | · | 740 m | MPC · JPL |
| 286848 | 2002 ND_{62} | — | July 2, 2002 | Palomar | NEAT | · | 2.2 km | MPC · JPL |
| 286849 | 2002 NG_{63} | — | July 9, 2002 | Palomar | NEAT | · | 840 m | MPC · JPL |
| 286850 | 2002 NA_{66} | — | July 9, 2002 | Palomar | NEAT | · | 800 m | MPC · JPL |
| 286851 | 2002 NQ_{66} | — | July 9, 2002 | Palomar | NEAT | · | 2.2 km | MPC · JPL |
| 286852 | 2002 NT_{67} | — | July 9, 2002 | Palomar | NEAT | · | 1.8 km | MPC · JPL |
| 286853 | 2002 NV_{67} | — | July 15, 2002 | Palomar | NEAT | (5) | 1.7 km | MPC · JPL |
| 286854 | 2002 NW_{68} | — | July 14, 2002 | Palomar | NEAT | · | 1.5 km | MPC · JPL |
| 286855 | 2002 ND_{69} | — | July 4, 2002 | Palomar | NEAT | · | 5.2 km | MPC · JPL |
| 286856 | 2002 NE_{69} | — | July 14, 2002 | Palomar | NEAT | · | 2.9 km | MPC · JPL |
| 286857 | 2002 NM_{70} | — | July 9, 2002 | Palomar | NEAT | · | 2.1 km | MPC · JPL |
| 286858 | 2002 NK_{72} | — | July 3, 2002 | Palomar | NEAT | · | 1.7 km | MPC · JPL |
| 286859 | 2002 NO_{72} | — | July 15, 2002 | Palomar | NEAT | · | 4.0 km | MPC · JPL |
| 286860 | 2002 NV_{72} | — | July 8, 2002 | Palomar | NEAT | · | 4.7 km | MPC · JPL |
| 286861 | 2002 NZ_{72} | — | July 8, 2002 | Palomar | NEAT | · | 1.7 km | MPC · JPL |
| 286862 | 2002 NO_{74} | — | July 12, 2002 | Palomar | NEAT | GEF | 1.3 km | MPC · JPL |
| 286863 | 2002 NW_{74} | — | May 6, 2006 | Mount Lemmon | Mount Lemmon Survey | MIS | 2.6 km | MPC · JPL |
| 286864 | 2002 OA_{5} | — | July 19, 2002 | Palomar | NEAT | · | 3.6 km | MPC · JPL |
| 286865 | 2002 OQ_{6} | — | July 20, 2002 | Palomar | NEAT | · | 1.9 km | MPC · JPL |
| 286866 | 2002 OR_{7} | — | July 18, 2002 | Palomar | NEAT | PHO | 1.1 km | MPC · JPL |
| 286867 | 2002 OJ_{11} | — | July 17, 2002 | Socorro | LINEAR | · | 1.2 km | MPC · JPL |
| 286868 | 2002 OQ_{12} | — | July 17, 2002 | Socorro | LINEAR | · | 2.0 km | MPC · JPL |
| 286869 | 2002 OU_{13} | — | July 18, 2002 | Socorro | LINEAR | EUN | 1.5 km | MPC · JPL |
| 286870 | 2002 OW_{14} | — | July 18, 2002 | Socorro | LINEAR | EUN | 2.0 km | MPC · JPL |
| 286871 | 2002 OD_{15} | — | July 18, 2002 | Socorro | LINEAR | EUN | 1.8 km | MPC · JPL |
| 286872 | 2002 OZ_{15} | — | July 18, 2002 | Socorro | LINEAR | · | 3.2 km | MPC · JPL |
| 286873 | 2002 OU_{19} | — | July 27, 2002 | Palomar | NEAT | · | 3.7 km | MPC · JPL |
| 286874 | 2002 ON_{21} | — | July 17, 2002 | Palomar | NEAT | · | 3.0 km | MPC · JPL |
| 286875 | 2002 OE_{24} | — | July 23, 2002 | Palomar | NEAT | · | 2.8 km | MPC · JPL |
| 286876 | 2002 OY_{26} | — | July 23, 2002 | Palomar | NEAT | · | 1.3 km | MPC · JPL |
| 286877 | 2002 OQ_{27} | — | July 22, 2002 | Palomar | NEAT | · | 1.8 km | MPC · JPL |
| 286878 | 2002 OT_{27} | — | July 22, 2002 | Palomar | NEAT | · | 1.4 km | MPC · JPL |
| 286879 | 2002 OZ_{27} | — | July 19, 2002 | Palomar | NEAT | · | 630 m | MPC · JPL |
| 286880 | 2002 OF_{28} | — | July 22, 2002 | Palomar | NEAT | · | 2.6 km | MPC · JPL |
| 286881 | 2002 OS_{28} | — | July 26, 2002 | Palomar | NEAT | · | 6.1 km | MPC · JPL |
| 286882 | 2002 OR_{32} | — | July 18, 2002 | Palomar | NEAT | · | 1.4 km | MPC · JPL |
| 286883 | 2002 OY_{35} | — | March 16, 2005 | Mount Lemmon | Mount Lemmon Survey | · | 2.0 km | MPC · JPL |
| 286884 | 2002 PE | — | August 1, 2002 | Needville | J. Dellinger | · | 1.5 km | MPC · JPL |
| 286885 | 2002 PE_{2} | — | August 3, 2002 | Palomar | NEAT | · | 3.6 km | MPC · JPL |
| 286886 | 2002 PL_{9} | — | August 5, 2002 | Palomar | NEAT | · | 1.1 km | MPC · JPL |
| 286887 | 2002 PP_{11} | — | August 5, 2002 | Campo Imperatore | CINEOS | · | 1.2 km | MPC · JPL |
| 286888 | 2002 PS_{13} | — | August 6, 2002 | Palomar | NEAT | · | 800 m | MPC · JPL |
| 286889 | 2002 PO_{21} | — | August 6, 2002 | Palomar | NEAT | · | 820 m | MPC · JPL |
| 286890 | 2002 PU_{21} | — | August 6, 2002 | Palomar | NEAT | EUN | 1.5 km | MPC · JPL |
| 286891 | 2002 PF_{28} | — | August 6, 2002 | Palomar | NEAT | · | 3.9 km | MPC · JPL |
| 286892 | 2002 PK_{31} | — | August 6, 2002 | Palomar | NEAT | V | 790 m | MPC · JPL |
| 286893 | 2002 PL_{33} | — | August 6, 2002 | Campo Imperatore | CINEOS | · | 4.1 km | MPC · JPL |
| 286894 | 2002 PF_{38} | — | August 6, 2002 | Palomar | NEAT | MAS | 740 m | MPC · JPL |
| 286895 | 2002 PJ_{39} | — | August 7, 2002 | Palomar | NEAT | · | 950 m | MPC · JPL |
| 286896 | 2002 PM_{43} | — | August 11, 2002 | Socorro | LINEAR | H | 750 m | MPC · JPL |
| 286897 | 2002 PL_{48} | — | August 10, 2002 | Socorro | LINEAR | DOR | 4.7 km | MPC · JPL |
| 286898 | 2002 PP_{48} | — | August 10, 2002 | Socorro | LINEAR | · | 3.1 km | MPC · JPL |
| 286899 | 2002 PB_{56} | — | August 9, 2002 | Socorro | LINEAR | EUN | 2.2 km | MPC · JPL |
| 286900 | 2002 PQ_{61} | — | August 11, 2002 | Socorro | LINEAR | EUN | 1.6 km | MPC · JPL |

== 286901–287000 ==
back to top

| Designation | | | Discovery | | | Properties | | Ref |
| Permanent | Provisional | Named after | Date | Site | Discoverer(s) | Category | Diam. | Ref |
|---|---|---|---|---|---|---|---|---|
| 286901 | 2002 PU_{64} | — | August 3, 2002 | Palomar | NEAT | · | 1.5 km | MPC · JPL |
| 286902 | 2002 PL_{66} | — | August 6, 2002 | Palomar | NEAT | · | 670 m | MPC · JPL |
| 286903 | 2002 PY_{67} | — | August 6, 2002 | Palomar | NEAT | NYS | 1.3 km | MPC · JPL |
| 286904 | 2002 PY_{68} | — | August 13, 2002 | Needville | J. Dellinger, L. Casady | · | 2.2 km | MPC · JPL |
| 286905 | 2002 PC_{69} | — | August 11, 2002 | Socorro | LINEAR | · | 2.8 km | MPC · JPL |
| 286906 | 2002 PS_{72} | — | August 12, 2002 | Socorro | LINEAR | · | 3.8 km | MPC · JPL |
| 286907 | 2002 PX_{72} | — | August 12, 2002 | Socorro | LINEAR | · | 2.9 km | MPC · JPL |
| 286908 | 2002 PE_{73} | — | August 12, 2002 | Socorro | LINEAR | ADE | 2.4 km | MPC · JPL |
| 286909 | 2002 PY_{73} | — | August 12, 2002 | Socorro | LINEAR | JUN | 1.5 km | MPC · JPL |
| 286910 | 2002 PB_{86} | — | August 13, 2002 | Socorro | LINEAR | · | 2.9 km | MPC · JPL |
| 286911 | 2002 PR_{86} | — | August 13, 2002 | Fountain Hills | C. W. Juels, P. R. Holvorcem | JUN | 1.7 km | MPC · JPL |
| 286912 | 2002 PL_{87} | — | August 14, 2002 | Palomar | NEAT | · | 2.2 km | MPC · JPL |
| 286913 | 2002 PW_{88} | — | August 13, 2002 | Kitt Peak | Spacewatch | V | 660 m | MPC · JPL |
| 286914 | 2002 PH_{89} | — | August 11, 2002 | Socorro | LINEAR | EUN | 1.7 km | MPC · JPL |
| 286915 | 2002 PR_{95} | — | August 14, 2002 | Socorro | LINEAR | · | 1.4 km | MPC · JPL |
| 286916 | 2002 PT_{96} | — | August 14, 2002 | Socorro | LINEAR | · | 2.1 km | MPC · JPL |
| 286917 | 2002 PV_{100} | — | August 11, 2002 | Palomar | NEAT | EUN | 1.4 km | MPC · JPL |
| 286918 | 2002 PP_{102} | — | August 12, 2002 | Socorro | LINEAR | · | 1.9 km | MPC · JPL |
| 286919 | 2002 PQ_{102} | — | August 12, 2002 | Socorro | LINEAR | · | 1.8 km | MPC · JPL |
| 286920 | 2002 PG_{104} | — | August 12, 2002 | Socorro | LINEAR | · | 3.0 km | MPC · JPL |
| 286921 | 2002 PO_{104} | — | August 12, 2002 | Socorro | LINEAR | · | 2.6 km | MPC · JPL |
| 286922 | 2002 PT_{104} | — | August 12, 2002 | Socorro | LINEAR | · | 2.8 km | MPC · JPL |
| 286923 | 2002 PW_{105} | — | August 12, 2002 | Socorro | LINEAR | · | 1.4 km | MPC · JPL |
| 286924 | 2002 PN_{106} | — | August 12, 2002 | Socorro | LINEAR | · | 2.4 km | MPC · JPL |
| 286925 | 2002 PT_{106} | — | August 12, 2002 | Socorro | LINEAR | · | 3.6 km | MPC · JPL |
| 286926 | 2002 PB_{109} | — | August 13, 2002 | Socorro | LINEAR | · | 850 m | MPC · JPL |
| 286927 | 2002 PA_{113} | — | August 12, 2002 | Socorro | LINEAR | · | 3.2 km | MPC · JPL |
| 286928 | 2002 PD_{113} | — | August 12, 2002 | Socorro | LINEAR | GAL | 2.1 km | MPC · JPL |
| 286929 | 2002 PT_{114} | — | August 15, 2002 | Kitt Peak | Spacewatch | · | 1.0 km | MPC · JPL |
| 286930 | 2002 PJ_{119} | — | August 13, 2002 | Anderson Mesa | LONEOS | · | 1.8 km | MPC · JPL |
| 286931 | 2002 PP_{119} | — | August 13, 2002 | Anderson Mesa | LONEOS | · | 2.1 km | MPC · JPL |
| 286932 | 2002 PL_{122} | — | August 14, 2002 | Kitt Peak | Spacewatch | (5) | 2.5 km | MPC · JPL |
| 286933 | 2002 PN_{123} | — | August 15, 2002 | Palomar | NEAT | · | 2.1 km | MPC · JPL |
| 286934 | 2002 PA_{124} | — | August 13, 2002 | Socorro | LINEAR | · | 1.6 km | MPC · JPL |
| 286935 | 2002 PS_{124} | — | August 13, 2002 | Anderson Mesa | LONEOS | · | 1.9 km | MPC · JPL |
| 286936 | 2002 PT_{127} | — | August 14, 2002 | Socorro | LINEAR | · | 2.8 km | MPC · JPL |
| 286937 | 2002 PN_{139} | — | August 12, 2002 | Haleakala | NEAT | · | 2.5 km | MPC · JPL |
| 286938 | 2002 PH_{142} | — | August 13, 2002 | Socorro | LINEAR | · | 2.1 km | MPC · JPL |
| 286939 | 2002 PJ_{158} | — | August 8, 2002 | Palomar | S. F. Hönig | · | 1.4 km | MPC · JPL |
| 286940 | 2002 PZ_{159} | — | August 8, 2002 | Palomar | S. F. Hönig | · | 1.2 km | MPC · JPL |
| 286941 | 2002 PJ_{161} | — | August 8, 2002 | Palomar | S. F. Hönig | · | 920 m | MPC · JPL |
| 286942 | 2002 PZ_{161} | — | August 8, 2002 | Palomar | S. F. Hönig | MAS | 760 m | MPC · JPL |
| 286943 | 2002 PN_{162} | — | August 8, 2002 | Palomar | S. F. Hönig | V | 830 m | MPC · JPL |
| 286944 | 2002 PD_{164} | — | August 8, 2002 | Palomar | S. F. Hönig | · | 1.1 km | MPC · JPL |
| 286945 | 2002 PO_{165} | — | August 8, 2002 | Palomar | S. F. Hönig | · | 1.2 km | MPC · JPL |
| 286946 | 2002 PY_{167} | — | August 8, 2002 | Palomar | NEAT | · | 1.2 km | MPC · JPL |
| 286947 | 2002 PA_{169} | — | August 8, 2002 | Palomar | NEAT | · | 2.1 km | MPC · JPL |
| 286948 | 2002 PC_{169} | — | August 27, 2002 | Palomar Mountain | NEAT | · | 1 km | MPC · JPL |
| 286949 | 2002 PP_{169} | — | August 8, 2002 | Palomar | NEAT | · | 2.2 km | MPC · JPL |
| 286950 | 2002 PX_{169} | — | August 8, 2002 | Palomar | NEAT | · | 2.2 km | MPC · JPL |
| 286951 | 2002 PJ_{170} | — | August 15, 2002 | Palomar | NEAT | · | 2.0 km | MPC · JPL |
| 286952 | 2002 PE_{172} | — | August 15, 2002 | Palomar | NEAT | · | 1.8 km | MPC · JPL |
| 286953 | 2002 PM_{173} | — | August 8, 2002 | Palomar | NEAT | URS | 5.8 km | MPC · JPL |
| 286954 | 2002 PO_{174} | — | August 15, 2002 | Palomar | NEAT | EOS | 2.7 km | MPC · JPL |
| 286955 | 2002 PL_{177} | — | August 11, 2002 | Palomar | NEAT | NYS | 1.2 km | MPC · JPL |
| 286956 | 2002 PS_{177} | — | August 11, 2002 | Palomar | NEAT | · | 1.5 km | MPC · JPL |
| 286957 | 2002 PE_{178} | — | August 7, 2002 | Palomar | NEAT | · | 1.6 km | MPC · JPL |
| 286958 | 2002 PR_{178} | — | August 13, 2002 | Socorro | LINEAR | · | 6.9 km | MPC · JPL |
| 286959 | 2002 PL_{180} | — | August 8, 2002 | Palomar | NEAT | · | 1.8 km | MPC · JPL |
| 286960 | 2002 PP_{181} | — | August 15, 2002 | Palomar | NEAT | · | 2.9 km | MPC · JPL |
| 286961 | 2002 PU_{182} | — | August 8, 2002 | Palomar | NEAT | · | 1.7 km | MPC · JPL |
| 286962 | 2002 PN_{185} | — | August 15, 2002 | Palomar | NEAT | KOR | 1.5 km | MPC · JPL |
| 286963 | 2002 PD_{190} | — | August 4, 2002 | Palomar | NEAT | · | 2.5 km | MPC · JPL |
| 286964 | 2002 PS_{192} | — | August 8, 2002 | Palomar | NEAT | · | 1.9 km | MPC · JPL |
| 286965 | 2002 PV_{192} | — | August 8, 2002 | Palomar | NEAT | · | 5.0 km | MPC · JPL |
| 286966 | 2002 PP_{194} | — | August 18, 2006 | Kitt Peak | Spacewatch | · | 930 m | MPC · JPL |
| 286967 | 2002 PR_{194} | — | October 8, 2007 | Kitt Peak | Spacewatch | · | 1.6 km | MPC · JPL |
| 286968 | 2002 QX_{2} | — | August 16, 2002 | Palomar | NEAT | · | 1.1 km | MPC · JPL |
| 286969 | 2002 QC_{8} | — | August 19, 2002 | Palomar | NEAT | · | 2.2 km | MPC · JPL |
| 286970 | 2002 QN_{11} | — | August 26, 2002 | Palomar | NEAT | · | 1.9 km | MPC · JPL |
| 286971 | 2002 QC_{13} | — | August 26, 2002 | Palomar | NEAT | · | 1.2 km | MPC · JPL |
| 286972 | 2002 QW_{16} | — | August 27, 2002 | Palomar | NEAT | · | 1.6 km | MPC · JPL |
| 286973 | 2002 QK_{17} | — | August 28, 2002 | Palomar | NEAT | · | 840 m | MPC · JPL |
| 286974 | 2002 QC_{19} | — | August 26, 2002 | Palomar | NEAT | · | 1.2 km | MPC · JPL |
| 286975 | 2002 QD_{19} | — | August 26, 2002 | Palomar | NEAT | NYS | 1.4 km | MPC · JPL |
| 286976 | 2002 QF_{22} | — | August 27, 2002 | Palomar | NEAT | · | 1.1 km | MPC · JPL |
| 286977 | 2002 QJ_{23} | — | August 27, 2002 | Palomar | NEAT | MAS | 730 m | MPC · JPL |
| 286978 | 2002 QR_{26} | — | August 29, 2002 | Palomar | NEAT | · | 1.3 km | MPC · JPL |
| 286979 | 2002 QS_{26} | — | August 29, 2002 | Palomar | NEAT | · | 1.7 km | MPC · JPL |
| 286980 | 2002 QO_{27} | — | August 28, 2002 | Palomar | NEAT | · | 1.3 km | MPC · JPL |
| 286981 | 2002 QM_{36} | — | August 28, 2002 | Palomar | NEAT | · | 2.1 km | MPC · JPL |
| 286982 | 2002 QL_{38} | — | August 30, 2002 | Kitt Peak | Spacewatch | · | 1.1 km | MPC · JPL |
| 286983 | 2002 QP_{38} | — | August 30, 2002 | Kitt Peak | Spacewatch | · | 1.7 km | MPC · JPL |
| 286984 | 2002 QD_{42} | — | August 30, 2002 | Palomar | NEAT | · | 2.0 km | MPC · JPL |
| 286985 | 2002 QG_{44} | — | August 30, 2002 | Palomar | NEAT | · | 2.1 km | MPC · JPL |
| 286986 | 2002 QX_{44} | — | August 30, 2002 | Palomar | NEAT | · | 1.4 km | MPC · JPL |
| 286987 | 2002 QC_{48} | — | August 18, 2002 | Palomar | S. F. Hönig | · | 3.4 km | MPC · JPL |
| 286988 | 2002 QW_{49} | — | August 29, 2002 | Palomar | R. Matson | · | 1.9 km | MPC · JPL |
| 286989 | 2002 QS_{51} | — | August 29, 2002 | Palomar | S. F. Hönig | · | 2.6 km | MPC · JPL |
| 286990 | 2002 QP_{52} | — | August 29, 2002 | Palomar | S. F. Hönig | (5) | 1.6 km | MPC · JPL |
| 286991 | 2002 QU_{53} | — | August 29, 2002 | Palomar | S. F. Hönig | · | 2.3 km | MPC · JPL |
| 286992 | 2002 QJ_{54} | — | August 28, 2002 | Palomar | Lowe, A. | · | 1.9 km | MPC · JPL |
| 286993 | 2002 QK_{54} | — | August 17, 2002 | Palomar | Lowe, A. | NYS | 1.1 km | MPC · JPL |
| 286994 | 2002 QN_{54} | — | August 29, 2002 | Palomar | S. F. Hönig | · | 1.3 km | MPC · JPL |
| 286995 | 2002 QV_{54} | — | August 29, 2002 | Palomar | S. F. Hönig | · | 2.6 km | MPC · JPL |
| 286996 | 2002 QT_{56} | — | August 29, 2002 | Palomar | S. F. Hönig | MAS | 750 m | MPC · JPL |
| 286997 | 2002 QK_{59} | — | August 28, 2002 | Palomar | NEAT | · | 1.9 km | MPC · JPL |
| 286998 | 2002 QT_{59} | — | August 19, 2002 | Palomar | NEAT | · | 820 m | MPC · JPL |
| 286999 | 2002 QF_{60} | — | August 16, 2002 | Palomar | NEAT | · | 2.2 km | MPC · JPL |
| 287000 | 2002 QS_{62} | — | August 28, 2002 | Palomar | NEAT | MIS | 3.2 km | MPC · JPL |

back to top

== See also ==
- Meanings of minor-planet names: 286001–287000
