= Ikaunieks =

Family name

Origin
- Origin: Latvian

Ikaunieks (feminine: Ikauniece) is a Latvian toponymic surname, derived from several locations in Latvia named Ikaunieki. Individuals with the surname include:

- Dāvis Ikaunieks (born 1994), Latvian footballer
- Jānis Ikaunieks (1912–1969), Latvian astronomer
- Jānis Ikaunieks (born 1995), Latvian footballer
