= Jānis Ikaunieks =

Latvian astronomer

Jānis Ikaunieks (28 April 1912 Riga – 27 April 1969 Riga) was a Latvian astronomer, who studied the characteristics of the red giants, and, in particular carbon stars. He founded the Latvian Astronomical Society and the popular science magazine The Starry Sky and was the first director of the Baldone Observatory at Baldone near Riga, Latvia.

== Biography ==
The main objects of Ikaunieks’ scientific investigations were red giants, and particularly carbon stars. He defended (1951) his thesis Kinematics and spatial distribution of carbon stars (Russian: Пространственное распределение и кинематика углеродных звёзд) at the P. K. Sternberg State Astronomical Institute of the M. V. Lomonosov Moscow State University (MSU), supervisor MSU prof. P. Parenago, and as the very first LAS astronomer received a scientific degree – Cand. of Phys&Math Sciences. Just there in Moscow, on 3 April 1969, Ikaunieks defended his doctoral thesis «Исследование звёзд красных гигантов» (Investigations of the stars – red giants). His monograph «Углеродные звёзды» (rus., 1971, coauthor Z. Alksne) translated in the USA (Carbon Stars. Z. K. Alksne and Ya. Ya. Ikaunieks; translated and edited by John H. Baumert. – Tucson, Arizona: Pachart Publishing House, 1981. – 182 p.).

He died in 1969, and was laid to rest on the territory of Baldone Observatory.

== The Starry Sky ==
He was the initiator and also editor-in-chief of the Astronomical Calendar (in Latvian) and the popular science quarterly The Starry Sky (Latvian: Zvaigžņotā debess).

== Baldone Astrophysical Observatory ==
Ikaunieks was instrumental in founding the Baldone Observatory (069, Baldones observatorija), located approximately 5 kilometers from the town of Baldone in Riekstukalns, southwest of Riga. In 1958 he became its first director until his death in 1969. It belongs to the Latvian Academy of Sciences (LAS) and is often referred to as Astrophysical Observatory of the Institute of Astronomy, University of Latvia (Latvian: Latvijas Universitātes Astronomijas institūta Astrofizikas observatorija).

The asteroid 274084 Baldone, discovered by Kazimieras Černis and Ilgmars Eglitis was named for the town of Baldone and its nearby observatory.

== Awards and honors ==
- In 1967, Ikaunieks was awarded the Order of Lenin, the highest decoration bestowed by the Soviet Union, for outstanding merits and intense work in popularization of scientific achievements.
- Asteroid 284984 Ikaunieks, discovered by Latvian astronomers Kazimieras Černis and Ilgmārs Eglītis at Baldone Observatory (069) in 2010, was named in his memory. The official naming citation was published by the Minor Planet Center on 7 February 2012 (M.P.C. 78272).
- IYA2009 commemorative Latvia stamp valued at Ls 0.50 features a portrait of Ikaunieks, Schmidt telescope, and galaxy M31.
