= List of minor planets: 284001–285000 =

The following is a partial list of minor planets, running from minor-planet number 284001 through 285000, inclusive. The primary data for this and other partial lists is based on JPL's "Small-Body Orbital Elements" and data available from the Minor Planet Center. Critical list information is also provided by the MPC, unless otherwise specified from Lowell Observatory. A detailed description of the table's columns and additional sources are given on the main page including a complete list of every page in this series, and a statistical break-up on the dynamical classification of minor planets.

Also see the summary list of all named bodies in numerical and alphabetical order, and the corresponding naming citations for the number range of this particular list. New namings may only be added to this list after official publication, as the preannouncement of names is condemned by the Working Group for Small Bodies Nomenclature of the International Astronomical Union.

Near-Earth obj.	MBA (inner)	MBA (outer)	Centaur
Mars-crosser	MBA (middle)	Jupiter trojan	Trans-Neptunian obj.
Unclassified

== 284001–284100 ==
Designation			Discovery			Properties		Ref
Permanent	Provisional	Named after	Date	Site	Discoverer(s)	Category	Diam.	Ref
284001	2004 TF_{98}	—	October 5, 2004	Kitt Peak	Spacewatch	·	1.3 km	MPC · JPL
284002	2004 TX_{108}	—	October 7, 2004	Socorro	LINEAR	·	1.2 km	MPC · JPL
284003	2004 TA_{122}	—	October 7, 2004	Anderson Mesa	LONEOS	NYS	1.7 km	MPC · JPL
284004	2004 TP_{123}	—	October 7, 2004	Anderson Mesa	LONEOS	·	2.4 km	MPC · JPL
284005	2004 TL_{127}	—	October 7, 2004	Socorro	LINEAR	·	1.1 km	MPC · JPL
284006	2004 TR_{127}	—	October 7, 2004	Socorro	LINEAR	V	1.0 km	MPC · JPL
284007	2004 TT_{128}	—	October 7, 2004	Socorro	LINEAR	MAS	880 m	MPC · JPL
284008	2004 TB_{161}	—	October 6, 2004	Kitt Peak	Spacewatch	MAS	820 m	MPC · JPL
284009	2004 TG_{163}	—	October 6, 2004	Kitt Peak	Spacewatch	·	1.3 km	MPC · JPL
284010	2004 TS_{196}	—	October 7, 2004	Kitt Peak	Spacewatch	3:2 · SHU	5.7 km	MPC · JPL
284011	2004 TZ_{206}	—	October 7, 2004	Kitt Peak	Spacewatch	MAS	950 m	MPC · JPL
284012	2004 TS_{214}	—	October 9, 2004	Kitt Peak	Spacewatch	NYS	1.3 km	MPC · JPL
284013	2004 TG_{242}	—	October 12, 2004	Moletai	K. Černis, Zdanavicius, J.	HOF	2.9 km	MPC · JPL
284014	2004 TU_{274}	—	October 9, 2004	Kitt Peak	Spacewatch	·	1.3 km	MPC · JPL
284015	2004 TX_{278}	—	October 9, 2004	Kitt Peak	Spacewatch	·	1.7 km	MPC · JPL
284016	2004 TD_{293}	—	October 10, 2004	Kitt Peak	Spacewatch	·	1.8 km	MPC · JPL
284017	2004 TG_{298}	—	October 12, 2004	Kitt Peak	Spacewatch	MAS	900 m	MPC · JPL
284018	2004 TA_{362}	—	October 15, 2004	Socorro	LINEAR	·	1.8 km	MPC · JPL
284019	2004 TA_{368}	—	October 7, 2004	Kitt Peak	Spacewatch	·	1.3 km	MPC · JPL
284020	2004 UL_{2}	—	October 18, 2004	Socorro	LINEAR	·	1.5 km	MPC · JPL
284021	2004 VE_{10}	—	November 3, 2004	Anderson Mesa	LONEOS	H	730 m	MPC · JPL
284022	2004 VD_{16}	—	November 5, 2004	Anderson Mesa	LONEOS	PHO	1.2 km	MPC · JPL
284023	2004 VP_{38}	—	November 4, 2004	Kitt Peak	Spacewatch	·	1.6 km	MPC · JPL
284024	2004 VV_{47}	—	November 4, 2004	Kitt Peak	Spacewatch	·	1.5 km	MPC · JPL
284025	2004 VV_{62}	—	November 7, 2004	Socorro	LINEAR	NYS	1.3 km	MPC · JPL
284026	2004 VC_{64}	—	November 7, 2004	Needville	Needville	·	2.6 km	MPC · JPL
284027	2004 VL_{79}	—	November 3, 2004	Kitt Peak	Spacewatch	MAS	980 m	MPC · JPL
284028	2004 WJ_{5}	—	November 19, 2004	Socorro	LINEAR	PHO	1.3 km	MPC · JPL
284029 Esplugafrancolí	2004 XQ_{16}	Esplugafrancolí	December 10, 2004	Begues	Manteca, J.	·	3.7 km	MPC · JPL
284030	2004 XV_{25}	—	December 9, 2004	Catalina	CSS	·	4.0 km	MPC · JPL
284031	2004 XD_{56}	—	December 10, 2004	Socorro	LINEAR	MAS	960 m	MPC · JPL
284032	2004 XS_{94}	—	December 11, 2004	Socorro	LINEAR	·	1.8 km	MPC · JPL
284033	2004 XW_{101}	—	December 9, 2004	Catalina	CSS	HNS	1.9 km	MPC · JPL
284034	2004 XA_{163}	—	December 15, 2004	Socorro	LINEAR	·	2.4 km	MPC · JPL
284035	2004 XE_{164}	—	December 3, 2004	Anderson Mesa	LONEOS	PHO	1.6 km	MPC · JPL
284036	2004 YO_{8}	—	December 18, 2004	Mount Lemmon	Mount Lemmon Survey	·	1.9 km	MPC · JPL
284037	2004 YR_{19}	—	December 18, 2004	Mount Lemmon	Mount Lemmon Survey	·	1.3 km	MPC · JPL
284038	2004 YP_{25}	—	December 18, 2004	Socorro	LINEAR	·	2.4 km	MPC · JPL
284039	2004 YJ_{36}	—	December 20, 2004	Mount Lemmon	Mount Lemmon Survey	HNS	1.8 km	MPC · JPL
284040	2005 AZ_{24}	—	January 7, 2005	Catalina	CSS	·	2.4 km	MPC · JPL
284041	2005 AD_{25}	—	January 8, 2005	Campo Imperatore	CINEOS	(5)	1.8 km	MPC · JPL
284042	2005 AG_{39}	—	January 13, 2005	Socorro	LINEAR	MAR	1.5 km	MPC · JPL
284043	2005 AU_{46}	—	January 11, 2005	Socorro	LINEAR	·	1.3 km	MPC · JPL
284044	2005 AA_{51}	—	January 13, 2005	Kitt Peak	Spacewatch	L5	10 km	MPC · JPL
284045	2005 AC_{53}	—	January 13, 2005	Kitt Peak	Spacewatch	·	1.4 km	MPC · JPL
284046	2005 AU_{61}	—	January 15, 2005	Kitt Peak	Spacewatch	L5	15 km	MPC · JPL
284047	2005 AC_{77}	—	January 15, 2005	Kitt Peak	Spacewatch	L5	16 km	MPC · JPL
284048	2005 BG_{4}	—	January 16, 2005	Kitt Peak	Spacewatch	·	1.5 km	MPC · JPL
284049	2005 BS_{6}	—	January 16, 2005	Socorro	LINEAR	·	3.0 km	MPC · JPL
284050	2005 BV_{11}	—	January 17, 2005	Kitt Peak	Spacewatch	·	1.8 km	MPC · JPL
284051	2005 BU_{20}	—	January 16, 2005	Kitt Peak	Spacewatch	·	2.3 km	MPC · JPL
284052	2005 BY_{25}	—	January 18, 2005	Catalina	CSS	GEF	1.8 km	MPC · JPL
284053	2005 BD_{37}	—	January 16, 2005	Mauna Kea	Veillet, C.	·	1.5 km	MPC · JPL
284054 Keeling	2005 CO_{2}	Keeling	February 1, 2005	Catalina	CSS	·	2.2 km	MPC · JPL
284055	2005 CA_{13}	—	February 2, 2005	Kitt Peak	Spacewatch	·	2.2 km	MPC · JPL
284056	2005 CS_{18}	—	February 2, 2005	Catalina	CSS	·	2.7 km	MPC · JPL
284057	2005 CT_{42}	—	February 2, 2005	Socorro	LINEAR	·	2.8 km	MPC · JPL
284058	2005 CV_{46}	—	February 2, 2005	Kitt Peak	Spacewatch	·	3.4 km	MPC · JPL
284059	2005 CG_{54}	—	February 4, 2005	Kitt Peak	Spacewatch	·	1.9 km	MPC · JPL
284060	2005 CH_{58}	—	February 2, 2005	Catalina	CSS	·	2.1 km	MPC · JPL
284061	2005 CV_{64}	—	February 9, 2005	Mount Lemmon	Mount Lemmon Survey	WIT	1.5 km	MPC · JPL
284062	2005 ER	—	March 1, 2005	Goodricke-Pigott	R. A. Tucker	HNS	2.0 km	MPC · JPL
284063	2005 EU_{1}	—	March 1, 2005	Kitt Peak	Spacewatch	H	710 m	MPC · JPL
284064	2005 EZ_{8}	—	March 2, 2005	Kitt Peak	Spacewatch	(5)	1.5 km	MPC · JPL
284065	2005 EU_{71}	—	March 2, 2005	Catalina	CSS	·	4.9 km	MPC · JPL
284066	2005 EG_{80}	—	March 3, 2005	Catalina	CSS	·	3.5 km	MPC · JPL
284067	2005 EX_{90}	—	March 8, 2005	Socorro	LINEAR	·	3.3 km	MPC · JPL
284068	2005 EU_{104}	—	March 4, 2005	Mount Lemmon	Mount Lemmon Survey	·	2.3 km	MPC · JPL
284069	2005 EO_{155}	—	March 8, 2005	Mount Lemmon	Mount Lemmon Survey	AGN	1.4 km	MPC · JPL
284070	2005 ER_{156}	—	March 9, 2005	Catalina	CSS	H	820 m	MPC · JPL
284071	2005 EQ_{157}	—	March 9, 2005	Mount Lemmon	Mount Lemmon Survey	PAD	1.7 km	MPC · JPL
284072	2005 EL_{164}	—	March 11, 2005	Catalina	CSS	·	3.4 km	MPC · JPL
284073	2005 EP_{250}	—	March 13, 2005	Socorro	LINEAR	H	790 m	MPC · JPL
284074	2005 ED_{254}	—	March 11, 2005	Mount Lemmon	Mount Lemmon Survey	·	2.4 km	MPC · JPL
284075	2005 GB_{16}	—	April 2, 2005	Catalina	CSS	HNS	1.5 km	MPC · JPL
284076	2005 GL_{78}	—	April 6, 2005	Catalina	CSS	·	2.0 km	MPC · JPL
284077	2005 GL_{133}	—	April 10, 2005	Kitt Peak	Spacewatch	·	2.4 km	MPC · JPL
284078	2005 GN_{141}	—	April 7, 2005	Kitt Peak	Spacewatch	·	3.8 km	MPC · JPL
284079	2005 JZ_{23}	—	May 3, 2005	Kitt Peak	Spacewatch	·	3.6 km	MPC · JPL
284080	2005 JC_{34}	—	May 4, 2005	Kitt Peak	Spacewatch	EOS ·	3.9 km	MPC · JPL
284081	2005 JS_{49}	—	May 4, 2005	Kitt Peak	Spacewatch	·	780 m	MPC · JPL
284082	2005 JS_{63}	—	May 10, 2005	Catalina	CSS	T_{j} (2.98)	4.1 km	MPC · JPL
284083	2005 JS_{79}	—	May 10, 2005	Mount Lemmon	Mount Lemmon Survey	·	3.3 km	MPC · JPL
284084	2005 JT_{93}	—	May 11, 2005	Palomar	NEAT	TIR	3.8 km	MPC · JPL
284085	2005 JS_{163}	—	May 9, 2005	Kitt Peak	Spacewatch	EOS	2.4 km	MPC · JPL
284086	2005 LA_{1}	—	June 1, 2005	Reedy Creek	J. Broughton	·	4.5 km	MPC · JPL
284087	2005 LU_{17}	—	June 6, 2005	Kitt Peak	Spacewatch	THM	2.3 km	MPC · JPL
284088	2005 LD_{35}	—	June 10, 2005	Kitt Peak	Spacewatch	·	3.6 km	MPC · JPL
284089	2005 LQ_{37}	—	June 11, 2005	Kitt Peak	Spacewatch	·	3.7 km	MPC · JPL
284090	2005 LR_{37}	—	June 11, 2005	Kitt Peak	Spacewatch	NAE	3.6 km	MPC · JPL
284091	2005 ME_{4}	—	June 16, 2005	Kitt Peak	Spacewatch	·	3.4 km	MPC · JPL
284092	2005 MQ_{27}	—	June 29, 2005	Kitt Peak	Spacewatch	·	4.2 km	MPC · JPL
284093	2005 MT_{32}	—	June 29, 2005	Kitt Peak	Spacewatch	·	5.5 km	MPC · JPL
284094	2005 MK_{34}	—	June 29, 2005	Palomar	NEAT	T_{j} (2.98) · EUP	4.1 km	MPC · JPL
284095	2005 MG_{42}	—	June 29, 2005	Kitt Peak	Spacewatch	·	3.5 km	MPC · JPL
284096	2005 NQ_{17}	—	July 3, 2005	Palomar	NEAT	·	870 m	MPC · JPL
284097	2005 NE_{23}	—	July 4, 2005	Kitt Peak	Spacewatch	·	3.7 km	MPC · JPL
284098	2005 NQ_{85}	—	July 3, 2005	Mount Lemmon	Mount Lemmon Survey	·	4.3 km	MPC · JPL
284099	2005 OG_{31}	—	July 31, 2005	Palomar	NEAT	·	5.0 km	MPC · JPL
284100	2005 QG_{55}	—	August 28, 2005	Kitt Peak	Spacewatch	·	1.1 km	MPC · JPL

== 284101–284200 ==
back to top

Designation			Discovery			Properties		Ref
Permanent	Provisional	Named after	Date	Site	Discoverer(s)	Category	Diam.	Ref
284101	2005 QV_{68}	—	August 28, 2005	Siding Spring	SSS	·	5.9 km	MPC · JPL
284102	2005 QO_{177}	—	August 29, 2005	Kitt Peak	Spacewatch	·	940 m	MPC · JPL
284103	2005 QP_{181}	—	August 30, 2005	Palomar	NEAT	·	850 m	MPC · JPL
284104	2005 RF_{21}	—	September 3, 2005	Palomar	NEAT	·	6.1 km	MPC · JPL
284105	2005 SJ_{63}	—	September 26, 2005	Kitt Peak	Spacewatch	·	600 m	MPC · JPL
284106	2005 SZ_{81}	—	September 24, 2005	Kitt Peak	Spacewatch	·	2.3 km	MPC · JPL
284107	2005 SC_{126}	—	September 29, 2005	Mount Lemmon	Mount Lemmon Survey	·	720 m	MPC · JPL
284108	2005 SL_{184}	—	September 29, 2005	Kitt Peak	Spacewatch	·	1.2 km	MPC · JPL
284109	2005 SE_{265}	—	September 26, 2005	Palomar	NEAT	·	850 m	MPC · JPL
284110	2005 SC_{282}	—	September 22, 2005	Apache Point	A. C. Becker	·	1.9 km	MPC · JPL
284111	2005 TK_{8}	—	October 1, 2005	Kitt Peak	Spacewatch	NYS	1.5 km	MPC · JPL
284112	2005 TJ_{41}	—	October 2, 2005	Mount Lemmon	Mount Lemmon Survey	EUN	1.2 km	MPC · JPL
284113	2005 TD_{45}	—	October 5, 2005	Mount Lemmon	Mount Lemmon Survey	NYS	1.2 km	MPC · JPL
284114	2005 TZ_{51}	—	October 13, 2005	Anderson Mesa	LONEOS	AMO +1km	920 m	MPC · JPL
284115	2005 TG_{173}	—	October 13, 2005	Socorro	LINEAR	(1547)	1.8 km	MPC · JPL
284116	2005 UD_{77}	—	October 24, 2005	Kitt Peak	Spacewatch	·	880 m	MPC · JPL
284117	2005 UF_{79}	—	October 25, 2005	Catalina	CSS	MAR	1.6 km	MPC · JPL
284118	2005 US_{112}	—	October 22, 2005	Kitt Peak	Spacewatch	·	830 m	MPC · JPL
284119	2005 UX_{131}	—	October 24, 2005	Palomar	NEAT	·	1.1 km	MPC · JPL
284120	2005 UM_{190}	—	October 27, 2005	Mount Lemmon	Mount Lemmon Survey	·	710 m	MPC · JPL
284121	2005 UC_{201}	—	October 25, 2005	Kitt Peak	Spacewatch	·	860 m	MPC · JPL
284122	2005 UM_{219}	—	October 25, 2005	Kitt Peak	Spacewatch	·	810 m	MPC · JPL
284123	2005 UZ_{238}	—	October 25, 2005	Kitt Peak	Spacewatch	·	880 m	MPC · JPL
284124	2005 UG_{239}	—	October 25, 2005	Kitt Peak	Spacewatch	·	850 m	MPC · JPL
284125	2005 UM_{244}	—	October 25, 2005	Kitt Peak	Spacewatch	·	600 m	MPC · JPL
284126	2005 UX_{258}	—	October 25, 2005	Kitt Peak	Spacewatch	3:2	7.1 km	MPC · JPL
284127	2005 US_{319}	—	October 27, 2005	Kitt Peak	Spacewatch	·	550 m	MPC · JPL
284128	2005 UM_{365}	—	October 27, 2005	Kitt Peak	Spacewatch	·	680 m	MPC · JPL
284129	2005 UO_{382}	—	October 27, 2005	Socorro	LINEAR	·	1.9 km	MPC · JPL
284130	2005 UT_{444}	—	October 30, 2005	Mount Lemmon	Mount Lemmon Survey	·	2.1 km	MPC · JPL
284131	2005 UV_{464}	—	October 30, 2005	Kitt Peak	Spacewatch	·	860 m	MPC · JPL
284132	2005 UQ_{478}	—	October 27, 2005	Kitt Peak	Spacewatch	·	1.1 km	MPC · JPL
284133	2005 UP_{504}	—	October 24, 2005	Mauna Kea	D. J. Tholen	·	960 m	MPC · JPL
284134	2005 VD_{38}	—	November 3, 2005	Mount Lemmon	Mount Lemmon Survey	·	740 m	MPC · JPL
284135	2005 VS_{57}	—	November 4, 2005	Mount Lemmon	Mount Lemmon Survey	V	690 m	MPC · JPL
284136	2005 VC_{77}	—	November 4, 2005	Socorro	LINEAR	·	890 m	MPC · JPL
284137	2005 VZ_{88}	—	November 6, 2005	Kitt Peak	Spacewatch	·	750 m	MPC · JPL
284138	2005 VW_{124}	—	November 5, 2005	Kitt Peak	Spacewatch	·	990 m	MPC · JPL
284139	2005 WS_{6}	—	November 21, 2005	Catalina	CSS	·	800 m	MPC · JPL
284140	2005 WK_{10}	—	November 22, 2005	Kitt Peak	Spacewatch	·	800 m	MPC · JPL
284141	2005 WM_{14}	—	November 22, 2005	Kitt Peak	Spacewatch	·	780 m	MPC · JPL
284142	2005 WM_{34}	—	November 21, 2005	Catalina	CSS	·	680 m	MPC · JPL
284143	2005 WV_{43}	—	November 21, 2005	Kitt Peak	Spacewatch	·	960 m	MPC · JPL
284144	2005 WX_{48}	—	November 25, 2005	Kitt Peak	Spacewatch	·	870 m	MPC · JPL
284145	2005 WF_{58}	—	November 22, 2005	Kitt Peak	Spacewatch	·	1.0 km	MPC · JPL
284146	2005 WE_{68}	—	November 22, 2005	Kitt Peak	Spacewatch	·	840 m	MPC · JPL
284147	2005 WX_{71}	—	November 22, 2005	Kitt Peak	Spacewatch	·	1.4 km	MPC · JPL
284148	2005 WP_{83}	—	November 25, 2005	Mount Lemmon	Mount Lemmon Survey	·	1.4 km	MPC · JPL
284149	2005 WK_{90}	—	November 28, 2005	Socorro	LINEAR	EUN	1.7 km	MPC · JPL
284150	2005 WP_{102}	—	November 24, 2005	Palomar	NEAT	PHO	3.2 km	MPC · JPL
284151	2005 WT_{151}	—	November 28, 2005	Catalina	CSS	·	1.1 km	MPC · JPL
284152	2005 XC_{4}	—	December 1, 2005	Palomar	NEAT	·	4.0 km	MPC · JPL
284153	2005 XN_{32}	—	December 4, 2005	Kitt Peak	Spacewatch	·	1.0 km	MPC · JPL
284154	2005 XO_{90}	—	December 8, 2005	Kitt Peak	Spacewatch	·	730 m	MPC · JPL
284155	2005 YY_{14}	—	December 22, 2005	Kitt Peak	Spacewatch	·	1.4 km	MPC · JPL
284156	2005 YV_{33}	—	December 24, 2005	Kitt Peak	Spacewatch	·	1.0 km	MPC · JPL
284157	2005 YL_{36}	—	December 25, 2005	Kitt Peak	Spacewatch	·	1.4 km	MPC · JPL
284158	2005 YS_{42}	—	December 24, 2005	Kitt Peak	Spacewatch	MAS	980 m	MPC · JPL
284159	2005 YW_{46}	—	December 25, 2005	Kitt Peak	Spacewatch	V	1.0 km	MPC · JPL
284160	2005 YB_{49}	—	December 22, 2005	Kitt Peak	Spacewatch	V	910 m	MPC · JPL
284161	2005 YM_{66}	—	December 25, 2005	Kitt Peak	Spacewatch	·	1.0 km	MPC · JPL
284162	2005 YE_{70}	—	December 26, 2005	Kitt Peak	Spacewatch	·	2.1 km	MPC · JPL
284163	2005 YX_{75}	—	December 24, 2005	Kitt Peak	Spacewatch	·	1.9 km	MPC · JPL
284164	2005 YU_{81}	—	December 24, 2005	Kitt Peak	Spacewatch	·	1.7 km	MPC · JPL
284165	2005 YB_{107}	—	December 25, 2005	Mount Lemmon	Mount Lemmon Survey	·	1.7 km	MPC · JPL
284166	2005 YS_{108}	—	December 25, 2005	Kitt Peak	Spacewatch	·	1.3 km	MPC · JPL
284167	2005 YK_{122}	—	December 24, 2005	Kitt Peak	Spacewatch	·	790 m	MPC · JPL
284168	2005 YU_{151}	—	December 26, 2005	Kitt Peak	Spacewatch	·	810 m	MPC · JPL
284169	2005 YX_{159}	—	December 27, 2005	Kitt Peak	Spacewatch	·	880 m	MPC · JPL
284170	2005 YZ_{161}	—	December 27, 2005	Kitt Peak	Spacewatch	V	820 m	MPC · JPL
284171	2005 YE_{241}	—	December 29, 2005	Kitt Peak	Spacewatch	·	1.4 km	MPC · JPL
284172	2005 YT_{270}	—	December 28, 2005	Catalina	CSS	V	880 m	MPC · JPL
284173	2005 YL_{282}	—	December 26, 2005	Mount Lemmon	Mount Lemmon Survey	L5	10 km	MPC · JPL
284174	2006 AL	—	January 2, 2006	Mount Lemmon	Mount Lemmon Survey	·	3.0 km	MPC · JPL
284175	2006 AP_{15}	—	January 5, 2006	Mount Lemmon	Mount Lemmon Survey	·	1.5 km	MPC · JPL
284176	2006 AH_{29}	—	January 6, 2006	Kitt Peak	Spacewatch	PHO	1.0 km	MPC · JPL
284177	2006 AT_{30}	—	January 4, 2006	Kitt Peak	Spacewatch	NYS	1.5 km	MPC · JPL
284178	2006 AM_{40}	—	January 7, 2006	Mount Lemmon	Mount Lemmon Survey	·	960 m	MPC · JPL
284179	2006 AO_{48}	—	January 8, 2006	Mount Lemmon	Mount Lemmon Survey	·	2.0 km	MPC · JPL
284180	2006 AR_{48}	—	January 8, 2006	Mount Lemmon	Mount Lemmon Survey	·	1.6 km	MPC · JPL
284181	2006 AT_{56}	—	January 7, 2006	Mount Lemmon	Mount Lemmon Survey	·	1.1 km	MPC · JPL
284182	2006 AS_{72}	—	January 6, 2006	Kitt Peak	Spacewatch	AGN	1.2 km	MPC · JPL
284183	2006 AB_{73}	—	January 7, 2006	Socorro	LINEAR	·	710 m	MPC · JPL
284184	2006 AX_{80}	—	January 8, 2006	Mount Lemmon	Mount Lemmon Survey	L5	10 km	MPC · JPL
284185	2006 AH_{87}	—	January 4, 2006	Kitt Peak	Spacewatch	·	1.3 km	MPC · JPL
284186	2006 AZ_{94}	—	January 9, 2006	Kitt Peak	Spacewatch	MAS	1.1 km	MPC · JPL
284187	2006 AZ_{100}	—	January 5, 2006	Socorro	LINEAR	·	1.2 km	MPC · JPL
284188	2006 AC_{102}	—	January 7, 2006	Mount Lemmon	Mount Lemmon Survey	·	1.9 km	MPC · JPL
284189	2006 AA_{105}	—	January 7, 2006	Mount Lemmon	Mount Lemmon Survey	·	1.5 km	MPC · JPL
284190	2006 BH_{1}	—	January 20, 2006	Kitt Peak	Spacewatch	·	2.8 km	MPC · JPL
284191	2006 BQ_{3}	—	January 21, 2006	Kitt Peak	Spacewatch	·	740 m	MPC · JPL
284192	2006 BR_{12}	—	January 21, 2006	Kitt Peak	Spacewatch	L5	10 km	MPC · JPL
284193	2006 BK_{13}	—	January 22, 2006	Anderson Mesa	LONEOS	GEF	1.6 km	MPC · JPL
284194	2006 BC_{24}	—	January 23, 2006	Socorro	LINEAR	·	1.2 km	MPC · JPL
284195	2006 BH_{25}	—	January 23, 2006	Mount Lemmon	Mount Lemmon Survey	·	1.1 km	MPC · JPL
284196	2006 BR_{31}	—	January 20, 2006	Kitt Peak	Spacewatch	·	1.5 km	MPC · JPL
284197	2006 BW_{95}	—	January 26, 2006	Kitt Peak	Spacewatch	·	1.8 km	MPC · JPL
284198	2006 BB_{115}	—	January 26, 2006	Kitt Peak	Spacewatch	·	2.0 km	MPC · JPL
284199	2006 BU_{116}	—	January 26, 2006	Kitt Peak	Spacewatch	·	2.0 km	MPC · JPL
284200	2006 BM_{128}	—	January 26, 2006	Mount Lemmon	Mount Lemmon Survey	·	1.6 km	MPC · JPL

== 284201–284300 ==
back to top

Designation			Discovery			Properties		Ref
Permanent	Provisional	Named after	Date	Site	Discoverer(s)	Category	Diam.	Ref
284201	2006 BB_{182}	—	January 27, 2006	Mount Lemmon	Mount Lemmon Survey	CLA	1.6 km	MPC · JPL
284202	2006 BC_{182}	—	January 27, 2006	Mount Lemmon	Mount Lemmon Survey	V	850 m	MPC · JPL
284203	2006 BK_{184}	—	January 28, 2006	Mount Lemmon	Mount Lemmon Survey	·	2.3 km	MPC · JPL
284204	2006 BM_{192}	—	January 30, 2006	Kitt Peak	Spacewatch	L5	10 km	MPC · JPL
284205	2006 BF_{194}	—	January 30, 2006	Kitt Peak	Spacewatch	V	880 m	MPC · JPL
284206	2006 BA_{196}	—	January 30, 2006	Kitt Peak	Spacewatch	·	960 m	MPC · JPL
284207	2006 BO_{200}	—	January 31, 2006	Kitt Peak	Spacewatch	·	1.8 km	MPC · JPL
284208	2006 BD_{203}	—	January 31, 2006	Kitt Peak	Spacewatch	NYS	1.7 km	MPC · JPL
284209	2006 BL_{219}	—	January 28, 2006	Mount Lemmon	Mount Lemmon Survey	·	1.9 km	MPC · JPL
284210	2006 BV_{219}	—	January 30, 2006	Kitt Peak	Spacewatch	·	890 m	MPC · JPL
284211	2006 BU_{237}	—	January 31, 2006	Kitt Peak	Spacewatch	·	1.8 km	MPC · JPL
284212	2006 BF_{248}	—	January 31, 2006	Kitt Peak	Spacewatch	·	1.8 km	MPC · JPL
284213	2006 BR_{252}	—	January 31, 2006	Kitt Peak	Spacewatch	·	1.3 km	MPC · JPL
284214	2006 BT_{262}	—	January 31, 2006	Kitt Peak	Spacewatch	V	730 m	MPC · JPL
284215	2006 BY_{269}	—	January 28, 2006	Catalina	CSS	·	1.5 km	MPC · JPL
284216	2006 CD_{8}	—	February 1, 2006	Mount Lemmon	Mount Lemmon Survey	·	1.4 km	MPC · JPL
284217	2006 CG_{18}	—	February 1, 2006	Mount Lemmon	Mount Lemmon Survey	L5	14 km	MPC · JPL
284218	2006 CZ_{25}	—	February 2, 2006	Kitt Peak	Spacewatch	·	1.7 km	MPC · JPL
284219	2006 CQ_{36}	—	February 2, 2006	Mount Lemmon	Mount Lemmon Survey	L5	10 km	MPC · JPL
284220	2006 CP_{49}	—	February 3, 2006	Socorro	LINEAR	·	1.2 km	MPC · JPL
284221	2006 CN_{51}	—	February 4, 2006	Kitt Peak	Spacewatch	·	1.5 km	MPC · JPL
284222	2006 DC_{2}	—	February 20, 2006	Kitt Peak	Spacewatch	RAF	930 m	MPC · JPL
284223	2006 DE_{10}	—	February 21, 2006	Catalina	CSS	EUN	1.6 km	MPC · JPL
284224	2006 DV_{21}	—	February 20, 2006	Kitt Peak	Spacewatch	·	1.6 km	MPC · JPL
284225	2006 DT_{42}	—	February 20, 2006	Kitt Peak	Spacewatch	·	1.2 km	MPC · JPL
284226	2006 DF_{44}	—	February 20, 2006	Catalina	CSS	L5	13 km	MPC · JPL
284227	2006 DK_{53}	—	February 24, 2006	Kitt Peak	Spacewatch	V	740 m	MPC · JPL
284228	2006 DZ_{53}	—	February 24, 2006	Mount Lemmon	Mount Lemmon Survey	·	980 m	MPC · JPL
284229	2006 DJ_{63}	—	February 22, 2006	Catalina	CSS	·	1.9 km	MPC · JPL
284230	2006 DB_{66}	—	February 21, 2006	Catalina	CSS	H	700 m	MPC · JPL
284231	2006 DM_{71}	—	February 21, 2006	Mount Lemmon	Mount Lemmon Survey	·	1.9 km	MPC · JPL
284232	2006 DZ_{73}	—	February 23, 2006	Kitt Peak	Spacewatch	·	1.0 km	MPC · JPL
284233	2006 DJ_{87}	—	February 24, 2006	Kitt Peak	Spacewatch	·	1.5 km	MPC · JPL
284234	2006 DE_{112}	—	February 27, 2006	Mount Lemmon	Mount Lemmon Survey	·	1.3 km	MPC · JPL
284235	2006 DK_{113}	—	February 27, 2006	Kitt Peak	Spacewatch	·	2.2 km	MPC · JPL
284236	2006 DZ_{122}	—	February 24, 2006	Kitt Peak	Spacewatch	KOR	1.6 km	MPC · JPL
284237	2006 DO_{141}	—	February 25, 2006	Kitt Peak	Spacewatch	·	1.5 km	MPC · JPL
284238	2006 DL_{166}	—	February 27, 2006	Kitt Peak	Spacewatch	·	1.8 km	MPC · JPL
284239	2006 DW_{172}	—	February 27, 2006	Kitt Peak	Spacewatch	NYS	1.7 km	MPC · JPL
284240	2006 DQ_{192}	—	February 27, 2006	Kitt Peak	Spacewatch	·	1.3 km	MPC · JPL
284241	2006 DZ_{212}	—	February 24, 2006	Kitt Peak	Spacewatch	·	1.8 km	MPC · JPL
284242	2006 EO_{9}	—	March 2, 2006	Kitt Peak	Spacewatch	MAS	930 m	MPC · JPL
284243	2006 EJ_{10}	—	March 2, 2006	Kitt Peak	Spacewatch	·	1.2 km	MPC · JPL
284244	2006 ES_{16}	—	March 2, 2006	Mount Lemmon	Mount Lemmon Survey	·	3.3 km	MPC · JPL
284245	2006 EW_{25}	—	March 3, 2006	Kitt Peak	Spacewatch	RAF	930 m	MPC · JPL
284246	2006 ES_{38}	—	March 4, 2006	Kitt Peak	Spacewatch	·	1.2 km	MPC · JPL
284247	2006 EN_{39}	—	March 4, 2006	Kitt Peak	Spacewatch	·	1.0 km	MPC · JPL
284248	2006 ER_{43}	—	March 5, 2006	Socorro	LINEAR	·	1.9 km	MPC · JPL
284249	2006 EN_{50}	—	March 4, 2006	Kitt Peak	Spacewatch	·	1.1 km	MPC · JPL
284250	2006 FT_{28}	—	March 24, 2006	Mount Lemmon	Mount Lemmon Survey	·	1.4 km	MPC · JPL
284251	2006 FP_{36}	—	March 21, 2006	Socorro	LINEAR	·	3.1 km	MPC · JPL
284252	2006 FO_{43}	—	March 22, 2006	Socorro	LINEAR	·	3.0 km	MPC · JPL
284253	2006 FW_{45}	—	March 25, 2006	Catalina	CSS	·	3.3 km	MPC · JPL
284254	2006 GC_{14}	—	April 2, 2006	Kitt Peak	Spacewatch	·	2.8 km	MPC · JPL
284255	2006 GC_{20}	—	April 2, 2006	Kitt Peak	Spacewatch	·	1.3 km	MPC · JPL
284256	2006 GH_{22}	—	April 2, 2006	Kitt Peak	Spacewatch	·	1.4 km	MPC · JPL
284257	2006 GP_{26}	—	April 2, 2006	Kitt Peak	Spacewatch	(17392)	1.8 km	MPC · JPL
284258	2006 GH_{27}	—	April 2, 2006	Kitt Peak	Spacewatch	·	1.8 km	MPC · JPL
284259	2006 GC_{29}	—	April 2, 2006	Kitt Peak	Spacewatch	·	1.3 km	MPC · JPL
284260	2006 GH_{33}	—	April 7, 2006	Kitt Peak	Spacewatch	·	1.5 km	MPC · JPL
284261	2006 GB_{39}	—	April 7, 2006	Anderson Mesa	LONEOS	·	2.4 km	MPC · JPL
284262	2006 GY_{51}	—	April 7, 2006	Siding Spring	SSS	·	2.1 km	MPC · JPL
284263	2006 HH_{7}	—	April 19, 2006	Anderson Mesa	LONEOS	·	2.5 km	MPC · JPL
284264	2006 HW_{9}	—	April 19, 2006	Kitt Peak	Spacewatch	·	1.7 km	MPC · JPL
284265	2006 HO_{22}	—	April 20, 2006	Kitt Peak	Spacewatch	·	2.1 km	MPC · JPL
284266	2006 HL_{28}	—	April 20, 2006	Kitt Peak	Spacewatch	TIR	2.9 km	MPC · JPL
284267	2006 HX_{44}	—	April 25, 2006	Kitt Peak	Spacewatch	·	2.7 km	MPC · JPL
284268	2006 HK_{77}	—	April 25, 2006	Kitt Peak	Spacewatch	·	2.7 km	MPC · JPL
284269	2006 HF_{84}	—	April 26, 2006	Kitt Peak	Spacewatch	·	3.9 km	MPC · JPL
284270	2006 HY_{88}	—	April 18, 2006	Palomar	NEAT	·	4.1 km	MPC · JPL
284271	2006 HA_{90}	—	April 26, 2006	Anderson Mesa	LONEOS	526	2.6 km	MPC · JPL
284272	2006 HC_{98}	—	April 30, 2006	Kitt Peak	Spacewatch	·	1.7 km	MPC · JPL
284273	2006 HF_{99}	—	April 30, 2006	Kitt Peak	Spacewatch	·	1.8 km	MPC · JPL
284274	2006 HS_{106}	—	April 30, 2006	Kitt Peak	Spacewatch	·	1.8 km	MPC · JPL
284275	2006 JW_{4}	—	May 2, 2006	Mount Lemmon	Mount Lemmon Survey	·	2.1 km	MPC · JPL
284276	2006 JL_{10}	—	May 1, 2006	Kitt Peak	Spacewatch	·	1.9 km	MPC · JPL
284277	2006 JO_{14}	—	May 1, 2006	Kitt Peak	Spacewatch	·	1.5 km	MPC · JPL
284278	2006 JJ_{27}	—	May 1, 2006	Kitt Peak	Spacewatch	·	1.4 km	MPC · JPL
284279	2006 JT_{40}	—	May 7, 2006	Kitt Peak	Spacewatch	·	2.2 km	MPC · JPL
284280	2006 JA_{44}	—	May 6, 2006	Kitt Peak	Spacewatch	·	1.8 km	MPC · JPL
284281	2006 JW_{45}	—	May 8, 2006	Siding Spring	SSS	·	1.9 km	MPC · JPL
284282	2006 JJ_{48}	—	May 5, 2006	Kitt Peak	Spacewatch	·	3.5 km	MPC · JPL
284283	2006 JJ_{50}	—	May 2, 2006	Mount Lemmon	Mount Lemmon Survey	·	2.3 km	MPC · JPL
284284	2006 JE_{57}	—	May 14, 2006	Palomar	NEAT	·	2.8 km	MPC · JPL
284285	2006 KW_{11}	—	May 20, 2006	Kitt Peak	Spacewatch	MAR	1.5 km	MPC · JPL
284286	2006 KR_{21}	—	May 19, 2006	Mount Lemmon	Mount Lemmon Survey	·	2.1 km	MPC · JPL
284287	2006 KO_{22}	—	May 20, 2006	Catalina	CSS	·	2.9 km	MPC · JPL
284288	2006 KN_{35}	—	May 20, 2006	Kitt Peak	Spacewatch	EUN	1.4 km	MPC · JPL
284289	2006 KM_{39}	—	May 20, 2006	Siding Spring	SSS	·	3.1 km	MPC · JPL
284290	2006 KR_{59}	—	May 22, 2006	Kitt Peak	Spacewatch	·	1.8 km	MPC · JPL
284291	2006 KE_{84}	—	May 22, 2006	Kitt Peak	Spacewatch	GEF	1.4 km	MPC · JPL
284292	2006 KH_{86}	—	May 23, 2006	Anderson Mesa	LONEOS	·	2.5 km	MPC · JPL
284293	2006 KP_{92}	—	May 25, 2006	Kitt Peak	Spacewatch	·	1.6 km	MPC · JPL
284294	2006 KK_{100}	—	May 29, 2006	Reedy Creek	J. Broughton	EUN	1.6 km	MPC · JPL
284295	2006 KT_{103}	—	May 30, 2006	Mount Nyukasa	Japan Aerospace Exploration Agency	·	2.4 km	MPC · JPL
284296	2006 KD_{109}	—	May 31, 2006	Mount Lemmon	Mount Lemmon Survey	·	1.4 km	MPC · JPL
284297	2006 KC_{117}	—	May 29, 2006	Kitt Peak	Spacewatch	WIT	1.2 km	MPC · JPL
284298	2006 KL_{120}	—	May 31, 2006	Kitt Peak	Spacewatch	·	1.6 km	MPC · JPL
284299	2006 KY_{140}	—	May 20, 2006	Mount Lemmon	Mount Lemmon Survey	·	2.1 km	MPC · JPL
284300	2006 KY_{143}	—	May 18, 2006	Palomar	NEAT	·	3.0 km	MPC · JPL

== 284301–284400 ==
back to top

Designation			Discovery			Properties		Ref
Permanent	Provisional	Named after	Date	Site	Discoverer(s)	Category	Diam.	Ref
284301	2006 OZ_{6}	—	July 24, 2006	Marly	Observatoire Naef	·	3.3 km	MPC · JPL
284302	2006 OK_{15}	—	July 30, 2006	Reedy Creek	J. Broughton	·	3.2 km	MPC · JPL
284303	2006 PY_{12}	—	August 14, 2006	Siding Spring	SSS	·	3.4 km	MPC · JPL
284304	2006 PL_{24}	—	August 12, 2006	Palomar	NEAT	·	4.1 km	MPC · JPL
284305	2006 PK_{34}	—	August 15, 2006	Palomar	NEAT	EOS	2.1 km	MPC · JPL
284306	2006 QO_{5}	—	August 16, 2006	Reedy Creek	J. Broughton	EOS	2.9 km	MPC · JPL
284307	2006 QR_{13}	—	August 17, 2006	Palomar	NEAT	·	2.9 km	MPC · JPL
284308	2006 QG_{33}	—	August 24, 2006	Pla D'Arguines	R. Ferrando	·	3.0 km	MPC · JPL
284309	2006 QJ_{40}	—	August 25, 2006	Siding Spring	SSS	H	520 m	MPC · JPL
284310	2006 QO_{49}	—	August 22, 2006	Palomar	NEAT	·	2.1 km	MPC · JPL
284311	2006 QA_{57}	—	August 19, 2006	Kitt Peak	Spacewatch	·	3.2 km	MPC · JPL
284312	2006 QB_{57}	—	August 19, 2006	Kitt Peak	Spacewatch	·	3.1 km	MPC · JPL
284313	2006 QF_{99}	—	August 23, 2006	Palomar	NEAT	·	2.9 km	MPC · JPL
284314	2006 QJ_{104}	—	August 27, 2006	Kitt Peak	Spacewatch	·	3.4 km	MPC · JPL
284315	2006 QH_{113}	—	August 24, 2006	Socorro	LINEAR	·	4.3 km	MPC · JPL
284316	2006 QQ_{118}	—	August 27, 2006	Anderson Mesa	LONEOS	(8737)	5.2 km	MPC · JPL
284317	2006 QV_{123}	—	August 29, 2006	Anderson Mesa	LONEOS	·	3.0 km	MPC · JPL
284318	2006 QX_{135}	—	August 28, 2006	Anderson Mesa	LONEOS	·	3.6 km	MPC · JPL
284319	2006 QJ_{142}	—	August 18, 2006	Palomar	NEAT	·	2.7 km	MPC · JPL
284320	2006 QK_{142}	—	August 18, 2006	Palomar	NEAT	·	5.2 km	MPC · JPL
284321	2006 QF_{161}	—	August 19, 2006	Kitt Peak	Spacewatch	·	3.4 km	MPC · JPL
284322	2006 QP_{164}	—	August 29, 2006	Anderson Mesa	LONEOS	·	4.8 km	MPC · JPL
284323	2006 QV_{164}	—	August 29, 2006	Anderson Mesa	LONEOS	·	3.7 km	MPC · JPL
284324	2006 QM_{166}	—	August 29, 2006	Anderson Mesa	LONEOS	·	5.4 km	MPC · JPL
284325	2006 QO_{170}	—	August 18, 2006	Palomar	NEAT	·	1.9 km	MPC · JPL
284326	2006 QG_{182}	—	August 27, 2006	Apache Point	A. C. Becker	·	2.2 km	MPC · JPL
284327	2006 RY_{1}	—	September 13, 2006	Eskridge	Farpoint	LIX	4.8 km	MPC · JPL
284328	2006 RD_{7}	—	September 14, 2006	Kitt Peak	Spacewatch	·	5.4 km	MPC · JPL
284329	2006 RE_{12}	—	September 14, 2006	Bergisch Gladbach	W. Bickel	·	4.8 km	MPC · JPL
284330	2006 RY_{12}	—	September 14, 2006	Kitt Peak	Spacewatch	·	4.2 km	MPC · JPL
284331	2006 RU_{14}	—	September 14, 2006	Kitt Peak	Spacewatch	EOS	4.1 km	MPC · JPL
284332	2006 RQ_{15}	—	September 14, 2006	Catalina	CSS	EOS	3.0 km	MPC · JPL
284333	2006 RB_{16}	—	September 14, 2006	Palomar	NEAT	·	3.1 km	MPC · JPL
284334	2006 RV_{17}	—	September 14, 2006	Palomar	NEAT	·	2.4 km	MPC · JPL
284335	2006 RR_{18}	—	September 14, 2006	Catalina	CSS	H	640 m	MPC · JPL
284336	2006 RS_{23}	—	September 13, 2006	Palomar	NEAT	·	3.0 km	MPC · JPL
284337	2006 RL_{24}	—	September 14, 2006	Kitt Peak	Spacewatch	·	2.8 km	MPC · JPL
284338	2006 RA_{41}	—	September 14, 2006	Kitt Peak	Spacewatch	·	2.7 km	MPC · JPL
284339	2006 RG_{41}	—	September 14, 2006	Palomar	NEAT	EUP	4.8 km	MPC · JPL
284340	2006 RR_{42}	—	September 14, 2006	Kitt Peak	Spacewatch	·	3.5 km	MPC · JPL
284341	2006 RK_{44}	—	September 14, 2006	Kitt Peak	Spacewatch	·	3.3 km	MPC · JPL
284342	2006 RD_{56}	—	September 14, 2006	Kitt Peak	Spacewatch	·	2.9 km	MPC · JPL
284343	2006 RN_{58}	—	September 15, 2006	Kitt Peak	Spacewatch	·	2.8 km	MPC · JPL
284344	2006 RY_{63}	—	September 12, 2006	Catalina	CSS	·	3.4 km	MPC · JPL
284345	2006 RY_{67}	—	September 15, 2006	Kitt Peak	Spacewatch	KOR	1.8 km	MPC · JPL
284346	2006 RC_{70}	—	September 15, 2006	Kitt Peak	Spacewatch	·	3.4 km	MPC · JPL
284347	2006 RT_{71}	—	September 15, 2006	Kitt Peak	Spacewatch	THM	2.4 km	MPC · JPL
284348	2006 RJ_{77}	—	September 15, 2006	Kitt Peak	Spacewatch	THM	2.4 km	MPC · JPL
284349	2006 RO_{95}	—	September 15, 2006	Kitt Peak	Spacewatch	EOS	2.0 km	MPC · JPL
284350	2006 RC_{98}	—	September 14, 2006	Palomar	NEAT	·	3.1 km	MPC · JPL
284351	2006 RJ_{98}	—	September 14, 2006	Palomar	NEAT	(43176)	5.0 km	MPC · JPL
284352	2006 RF_{121}	—	September 6, 2006	Palomar	NEAT	·	7.3 km	MPC · JPL
284353	2006 SU_{42}	—	September 18, 2006	Catalina	CSS	·	2.1 km	MPC · JPL
284354	2006 SK_{60}	—	September 18, 2006	Catalina	CSS	LIX	6.1 km	MPC · JPL
284355	2006 ST_{62}	—	September 18, 2006	Kitt Peak	Spacewatch	·	3.1 km	MPC · JPL
284356	2006 SU_{67}	—	September 19, 2006	Catalina	CSS	·	2.4 km	MPC · JPL
284357 Semseyandor	2006 SA_{78}	Semseyandor	September 23, 2006	Piszkéstető	K. Sárneczky, Kuli, Z.	·	3.8 km	MPC · JPL
284358	2006 SX_{86}	—	September 18, 2006	Kitt Peak	Spacewatch	THM	2.6 km	MPC · JPL
284359	2006 SF_{116}	—	September 24, 2006	Anderson Mesa	LONEOS	·	5.3 km	MPC · JPL
284360	2006 SV_{120}	—	September 18, 2006	Catalina	CSS	·	3.2 km	MPC · JPL
284361	2006 SP_{126}	—	September 21, 2006	Anderson Mesa	LONEOS	·	3.7 km	MPC · JPL
284362	2006 SM_{128}	—	September 17, 2006	Anderson Mesa	LONEOS	·	4.0 km	MPC · JPL
284363	2006 SY_{133}	—	September 17, 2006	Catalina	CSS	·	3.4 km	MPC · JPL
284364	2006 SY_{145}	—	September 19, 2006	Kitt Peak	Spacewatch	THM	3.4 km	MPC · JPL
284365	2006 SP_{153}	—	September 20, 2006	Catalina	CSS	EOS	3.2 km	MPC · JPL
284366	2006 SM_{154}	—	September 20, 2006	Palomar	NEAT	·	3.8 km	MPC · JPL
284367	2006 SD_{183}	—	September 25, 2006	Mount Lemmon	Mount Lemmon Survey	THM	2.5 km	MPC · JPL
284368	2006 SU_{183}	—	September 25, 2006	Mount Lemmon	Mount Lemmon Survey	THM	2.3 km	MPC · JPL
284369	2006 SZ_{183}	—	September 25, 2006	Kitt Peak	Spacewatch	·	3.0 km	MPC · JPL
284370	2006 SX_{184}	—	September 25, 2006	Mount Lemmon	Mount Lemmon Survey	·	2.9 km	MPC · JPL
284371	2006 SZ_{201}	—	September 24, 2006	Kitt Peak	Spacewatch	·	970 m	MPC · JPL
284372	2006 SG_{212}	—	September 26, 2006	Kitt Peak	Spacewatch	H	540 m	MPC · JPL
284373	2006 SL_{227}	—	September 26, 2006	Kitt Peak	Spacewatch	HYG	3.3 km	MPC · JPL
284374	2006 ST_{250}	—	September 26, 2006	Kitt Peak	Spacewatch	·	3.8 km	MPC · JPL
284375	2006 SJ_{285}	—	September 27, 2006	Mount Lemmon	Mount Lemmon Survey	·	3.3 km	MPC · JPL
284376	2006 SP_{286}	—	September 21, 2006	Anderson Mesa	LONEOS	·	4.5 km	MPC · JPL
284377	2006 SE_{291}	—	September 16, 2006	Catalina	CSS	H	800 m	MPC · JPL
284378	2006 SL_{291}	—	September 16, 2006	Siding Spring	SSS	·	3.9 km	MPC · JPL
284379	2006 SN_{315}	—	September 27, 2006	Kitt Peak	Spacewatch	·	3.0 km	MPC · JPL
284380	2006 SJ_{337}	—	September 28, 2006	Kitt Peak	Spacewatch	VER	3.7 km	MPC · JPL
284381	2006 SA_{339}	—	September 28, 2006	Kitt Peak	Spacewatch	·	2.7 km	MPC · JPL
284382	2006 SV_{352}	—	September 30, 2006	Catalina	CSS	·	3.6 km	MPC · JPL
284383	2006 SC_{363}	—	September 30, 2006	Catalina	CSS	·	860 m	MPC · JPL
284384	2006 SD_{371}	—	September 27, 2006	Catalina	CSS	EUP	6.6 km	MPC · JPL
284385	2006 SB_{376}	—	September 17, 2006	Apache Point	A. C. Becker	·	2.8 km	MPC · JPL
284386	2006 SE_{376}	—	September 17, 2006	Apache Point	A. C. Becker	·	4.5 km	MPC · JPL
284387	2006 SU_{381}	—	September 28, 2006	Apache Point	A. C. Becker	·	3.7 km	MPC · JPL
284388	2006 SZ_{386}	—	September 30, 2006	Apache Point	A. C. Becker	·	3.2 km	MPC · JPL
284389	2006 TT_{14}	—	October 11, 2006	Kitt Peak	Spacewatch	·	4.3 km	MPC · JPL
284390	2006 TM_{20}	—	October 11, 2006	Kitt Peak	Spacewatch	·	1.2 km	MPC · JPL
284391	2006 TQ_{23}	—	October 11, 2006	Kitt Peak	Spacewatch	·	4.6 km	MPC · JPL
284392	2006 TE_{37}	—	October 12, 2006	Kitt Peak	Spacewatch	·	3.2 km	MPC · JPL
284393	2006 TQ_{56}	—	October 13, 2006	Kitt Peak	Spacewatch	VER	3.3 km	MPC · JPL
284394	2006 TT_{57}	—	October 15, 2006	Catalina	CSS	·	3.1 km	MPC · JPL
284395	2006 TW_{59}	—	October 13, 2006	Kitt Peak	Spacewatch	·	3.1 km	MPC · JPL
284396	2006 TE_{65}	—	October 11, 2006	Palomar	NEAT	EOS	2.5 km	MPC · JPL
284397	2006 TY_{91}	—	October 13, 2006	Kitt Peak	Spacewatch	LIX	5.1 km	MPC · JPL
284398	2006 TN_{111}	—	October 1, 2006	Apache Point	A. C. Becker	·	2.9 km	MPC · JPL
284399	2006 UZ_{7}	—	October 16, 2006	Catalina	CSS	·	810 m	MPC · JPL
284400	2006 UC_{17}	—	October 19, 2006	Catalina	CSS	T_{j} (2.92)	5.9 km	MPC · JPL

== 284401–284500 ==
back to top

Designation			Discovery			Properties		Ref
Permanent	Provisional	Named after	Date	Site	Discoverer(s)	Category	Diam.	Ref
284401	2006 UD_{54}	—	October 17, 2006	Catalina	CSS	V	890 m	MPC · JPL
284402	2006 UC_{80}	—	October 17, 2006	Mount Lemmon	Mount Lemmon Survey	·	3.9 km	MPC · JPL
284403	2006 UP_{91}	—	October 18, 2006	Kitt Peak	Spacewatch	·	4.1 km	MPC · JPL
284404	2006 UF_{96}	—	October 18, 2006	Kitt Peak	Spacewatch	·	710 m	MPC · JPL
284405	2006 UH_{127}	—	October 19, 2006	Kitt Peak	Spacewatch	·	3.3 km	MPC · JPL
284406	2006 UU_{153}	—	October 21, 2006	Kitt Peak	Spacewatch	·	3.3 km	MPC · JPL
284407	2006 UQ_{156}	—	October 21, 2006	Catalina	CSS	·	3.6 km	MPC · JPL
284408	2006 UV_{183}	—	October 18, 2006	Siding Spring	SSS	H	830 m	MPC · JPL
284409	2006 UP_{191}	—	October 19, 2006	Catalina	CSS	·	4.0 km	MPC · JPL
284410	2006 UF_{200}	—	October 21, 2006	Kitt Peak	Spacewatch	H	690 m	MPC · JPL
284411	2006 UU_{202}	—	October 22, 2006	Palomar	NEAT	·	3.3 km	MPC · JPL
284412	2006 UY_{222}	—	October 17, 2006	Catalina	CSS	·	3.9 km	MPC · JPL
284413	2006 UH_{228}	—	October 20, 2006	Palomar	NEAT	·	4.1 km	MPC · JPL
284414	2006 UC_{230}	—	October 21, 2006	Palomar	NEAT	·	3.6 km	MPC · JPL
284415	2006 UZ_{232}	—	October 21, 2006	Palomar	NEAT	EMA	4.0 km	MPC · JPL
284416	2006 UC_{309}	—	October 19, 2006	Kitt Peak	M. W. Buie	·	2.9 km	MPC · JPL
284417	2006 UY_{329}	—	October 31, 2006	Mount Lemmon	Mount Lemmon Survey	·	880 m	MPC · JPL
284418	2006 VV_{144}	—	November 15, 2006	Catalina	CSS	H	890 m	MPC · JPL
284419	2006 WD_{150}	—	November 20, 2006	Kitt Peak	Spacewatch	HIL · 3:2	7.7 km	MPC · JPL
284420	2006 XM_{5}	—	December 6, 2006	Palomar	NEAT	·	5.3 km	MPC · JPL
284421	2006 XM_{38}	—	December 11, 2006	Kitt Peak	Spacewatch	MAS	850 m	MPC · JPL
284422	2006 YD	—	December 16, 2006	Catalina	CSS	APO +1km	1.2 km	MPC · JPL
284423	2007 AR_{17}	—	January 15, 2007	Catalina	CSS	·	1.5 km	MPC · JPL
284424	2007 BO_{36}	—	January 24, 2007	Socorro	LINEAR	·	1.6 km	MPC · JPL
284425	2007 BG_{68}	—	January 27, 2007	Kitt Peak	Spacewatch	·	1.1 km	MPC · JPL
284426	2007 CT	—	February 5, 2007	Lulin	Lin, H.-C., Q. Ye	NYS	1.5 km	MPC · JPL
284427	2007 CD_{35}	—	February 6, 2007	Kitt Peak	Spacewatch	·	1.5 km	MPC · JPL
284428	2007 CE_{64}	—	February 13, 2007	Mount Lemmon	Mount Lemmon Survey	·	1.6 km	MPC · JPL
284429	2007 DC_{4}	—	February 16, 2007	Mount Lemmon	Mount Lemmon Survey	·	1.1 km	MPC · JPL
284430	2007 DQ_{10}	—	February 17, 2007	Kitt Peak	Spacewatch	(5)	1.3 km	MPC · JPL
284431	2007 DB_{30}	—	February 17, 2007	Kitt Peak	Spacewatch	·	940 m	MPC · JPL
284432	2007 DV_{38}	—	February 17, 2007	Kitt Peak	Spacewatch	·	890 m	MPC · JPL
284433	2007 DU_{52}	—	February 19, 2007	Mount Lemmon	Mount Lemmon Survey	L5	13 km	MPC · JPL
284434	2007 DQ_{53}	—	February 19, 2007	Mount Lemmon	Mount Lemmon Survey	·	720 m	MPC · JPL
284435	2007 DZ_{62}	—	February 21, 2007	Kitt Peak	Spacewatch	·	960 m	MPC · JPL
284436	2007 DR_{96}	—	February 23, 2007	Mount Lemmon	Mount Lemmon Survey	L5	17 km	MPC · JPL
284437	2007 DB_{98}	—	February 23, 2007	Kitt Peak	Spacewatch	·	1.2 km	MPC · JPL
284438	2007 DC_{105}	—	February 21, 2007	Kitt Peak	Spacewatch	·	1.4 km	MPC · JPL
284439	2007 DQ_{114}	—	February 26, 2007	Mount Lemmon	Mount Lemmon Survey	·	790 m	MPC · JPL
284440	2007 EF_{9}	—	March 9, 2007	Mount Lemmon	Mount Lemmon Survey	·	1.0 km	MPC · JPL
284441	2007 EN_{37}	—	March 11, 2007	Mount Lemmon	Mount Lemmon Survey	·	1.0 km	MPC · JPL
284442	2007 ES_{40}	—	March 9, 2007	Kitt Peak	Spacewatch	L5	10 km	MPC · JPL
284443	2007 EE_{51}	—	March 10, 2007	Kitt Peak	Spacewatch	L5	9.0 km	MPC · JPL
284444	2007 EZ_{51}	—	March 11, 2007	Catalina	CSS	·	1.1 km	MPC · JPL
284445	2007 EU_{86}	—	March 13, 2007	Catalina	CSS	·	1.2 km	MPC · JPL
284446	2007 EB_{91}	—	March 9, 2007	Mount Lemmon	Mount Lemmon Survey	·	1.3 km	MPC · JPL
284447	2007 ET_{144}	—	March 12, 2007	Mount Lemmon	Mount Lemmon Survey	L5	9.6 km	MPC · JPL
284448	2007 EE_{153}	—	March 12, 2007	Mount Lemmon	Mount Lemmon Survey	·	690 m	MPC · JPL
284449	2007 EL_{191}	—	March 13, 2007	Kitt Peak	Spacewatch	·	1.0 km	MPC · JPL
284450	2007 EY_{213}	—	March 11, 2007	Mount Lemmon	Mount Lemmon Survey	·	2.4 km	MPC · JPL
284451	2007 ES_{218}	—	March 11, 2007	Catalina	CSS	·	1.1 km	MPC · JPL
284452	2007 EU_{218}	—	March 11, 2007	Mount Lemmon	Mount Lemmon Survey	L5	9.3 km	MPC · JPL
284453	2007 EE_{220}	—	March 13, 2007	Mount Lemmon	Mount Lemmon Survey	·	870 m	MPC · JPL
284454	2007 EX_{221}	—	March 9, 2007	Kitt Peak	Spacewatch	L5	12 km	MPC · JPL
284455	2007 FF_{20}	—	March 24, 2007	Marly	P. Kocher	·	1.5 km	MPC · JPL
284456	2007 FM_{28}	—	March 20, 2007	Mount Lemmon	Mount Lemmon Survey	·	1.2 km	MPC · JPL
284457	2007 FT_{36}	—	March 26, 2007	Kitt Peak	Spacewatch	·	920 m	MPC · JPL
284458	2007 GB_{1}	—	April 8, 2007	Vallemare Borbona	V. S. Casulli	·	950 m	MPC · JPL
284459	2007 GG_{10}	—	April 11, 2007	Kitt Peak	Spacewatch	L5	12 km	MPC · JPL
284460	2007 GH_{19}	—	April 11, 2007	Kitt Peak	Spacewatch	NYS	1.2 km	MPC · JPL
284461	2007 GH_{30}	—	April 14, 2007	Mount Lemmon	Mount Lemmon Survey	·	1.5 km	MPC · JPL
284462	2007 GL_{36}	—	April 14, 2007	Kitt Peak	Spacewatch	·	1.1 km	MPC · JPL
284463	2007 GO_{40}	—	April 14, 2007	Kitt Peak	Spacewatch	MAS	800 m	MPC · JPL
284464	2007 GE_{42}	—	April 14, 2007	Kitt Peak	Spacewatch	·	1.3 km	MPC · JPL
284465	2007 GU_{53}	—	April 14, 2007	Mount Lemmon	Mount Lemmon Survey	(883)	850 m	MPC · JPL
284466	2007 GF_{56}	—	April 15, 2007	Kitt Peak	Spacewatch	·	820 m	MPC · JPL
284467	2007 GH_{64}	—	April 15, 2007	Kitt Peak	Spacewatch	·	920 m	MPC · JPL
284468	2007 GH_{67}	—	April 15, 2007	Kitt Peak	Spacewatch	·	1 km	MPC · JPL
284469	2007 GW_{76}	—	April 12, 2007	Siding Spring	SSS	·	1.7 km	MPC · JPL
284470	2007 HT_{6}	—	April 16, 2007	Mount Lemmon	Mount Lemmon Survey	·	1.5 km	MPC · JPL
284471	2007 HP_{21}	—	April 18, 2007	Kitt Peak	Spacewatch	·	3.0 km	MPC · JPL
284472	2007 HC_{39}	—	April 20, 2007	Kitt Peak	Spacewatch	·	750 m	MPC · JPL
284473	2007 HX_{40}	—	April 20, 2007	Kitt Peak	Spacewatch	NYS	1.2 km	MPC · JPL
284474	2007 HR_{50}	—	April 20, 2007	Kitt Peak	Spacewatch	·	1.1 km	MPC · JPL
284475	2007 HJ_{57}	—	April 22, 2007	Mount Lemmon	Mount Lemmon Survey	·	3.0 km	MPC · JPL
284476	2007 HQ_{59}	—	April 18, 2007	Mount Lemmon	Mount Lemmon Survey	MAS	820 m	MPC · JPL
284477	2007 HG_{86}	—	April 24, 2007	Kitt Peak	Spacewatch	·	1.3 km	MPC · JPL
284478	2007 HK_{88}	—	April 19, 2007	Socorro	LINEAR	NYS	1.7 km	MPC · JPL
284479	2007 HB_{98}	—	April 20, 2007	Kitt Peak	Spacewatch	·	1.1 km	MPC · JPL
284480	2007 JT_{1}	—	May 7, 2007	Catalina	CSS	·	1.4 km	MPC · JPL
284481	2007 JU_{3}	—	May 6, 2007	Purple Mountain	PMO NEO Survey Program	·	1.4 km	MPC · JPL
284482	2007 JF_{20}	—	May 11, 2007	Mount Lemmon	Mount Lemmon Survey	NYS	1.2 km	MPC · JPL
284483	2007 JG_{21}	—	May 11, 2007	Tiki	S. F. Hönig, Teamo, N.	·	1.5 km	MPC · JPL
284484	2007 JD_{27}	—	May 9, 2007	Kitt Peak	Spacewatch	·	2.5 km	MPC · JPL
284485	2007 JL_{44}	—	May 12, 2007	Purple Mountain	PMO NEO Survey Program	·	1.9 km	MPC · JPL
284486	2007 LR_{20}	—	June 10, 2007	Kitt Peak	Spacewatch	·	1.2 km	MPC · JPL
284487	2007 LV_{26}	—	June 14, 2007	Kitt Peak	Spacewatch	·	2.4 km	MPC · JPL
284488	2007 MF_{15}	—	June 20, 2007	Kitt Peak	Spacewatch	·	1.9 km	MPC · JPL
284489	2007 MJ_{16}	—	June 21, 2007	Kitt Peak	Spacewatch	·	1.1 km	MPC · JPL
284490	2007 NZ	—	July 11, 2007	La Sagra	OAM	·	1.3 km	MPC · JPL
284491	2007 NQ_{2}	—	July 13, 2007	La Sagra	OAM	·	1.6 km	MPC · JPL
284492	2007 NF_{5}	—	July 11, 2007	Lulin	LUSS	·	2.1 km	MPC · JPL
284493	2007 ND_{6}	—	July 10, 2007	Siding Spring	SSS	·	3.1 km	MPC · JPL
284494	2007 OB_{1}	—	July 16, 2007	Socorro	LINEAR	PHO	1.7 km	MPC · JPL
284495	2007 OX_{1}	—	July 19, 2007	Tiki	S. F. Hönig, Teamo, N.	·	1.6 km	MPC · JPL
284496	2007 PD_{7}	—	August 5, 2007	Socorro	LINEAR	·	1.9 km	MPC · JPL
284497	2007 PU_{8}	—	August 5, 2007	Dauban	Chante-Perdrix	·	1.2 km	MPC · JPL
284498	2007 PH_{9}	—	August 11, 2007	Bisei SG Center	BATTeRS	·	1.8 km	MPC · JPL
284499	2007 PS_{14}	—	August 8, 2007	Socorro	LINEAR	·	1.5 km	MPC · JPL
284500	2007 PE_{15}	—	August 8, 2007	Socorro	LINEAR	(5)	1.4 km	MPC · JPL

== 284501–284600 ==
back to top

Designation			Discovery			Properties		Ref
Permanent	Provisional	Named after	Date	Site	Discoverer(s)	Category	Diam.	Ref
284501	2007 PU_{18}	—	August 9, 2007	Socorro	LINEAR	·	1.3 km	MPC · JPL
284502	2007 PV_{24}	—	August 12, 2007	Socorro	LINEAR	·	3.0 km	MPC · JPL
284503	2007 PD_{26}	—	August 11, 2007	Socorro	LINEAR	·	1.6 km	MPC · JPL
284504	2007 PM_{26}	—	August 12, 2007	Socorro	LINEAR	V	1.1 km	MPC · JPL
284505	2007 PU_{32}	—	August 9, 2007	Socorro	LINEAR	·	2.0 km	MPC · JPL
284506	2007 PO_{33}	—	August 11, 2007	Socorro	LINEAR	(5)	1.6 km	MPC · JPL
284507	2007 PP_{37}	—	August 13, 2007	Socorro	LINEAR	·	1.7 km	MPC · JPL
284508	2007 PX_{38}	—	August 15, 2007	Socorro	LINEAR	·	1.2 km	MPC · JPL
284509	2007 QU_{12}	—	August 21, 2007	Siding Spring	SSS	·	2.2 km	MPC · JPL
284510	2007 RM_{15}	—	September 12, 2007	Hibiscus	S. F. Hönig, Teamo, N.	·	1.7 km	MPC · JPL
284511	2007 RZ_{20}	—	September 3, 2007	Catalina	CSS	MAS	1.1 km	MPC · JPL
284512	2007 RQ_{35}	—	September 8, 2007	Anderson Mesa	LONEOS	·	3.9 km	MPC · JPL
284513	2007 RY_{37}	—	September 8, 2007	Anderson Mesa	LONEOS	·	3.5 km	MPC · JPL
284514	2007 RS_{38}	—	September 8, 2007	Anderson Mesa	LONEOS	·	3.1 km	MPC · JPL
284515	2007 RR_{45}	—	September 9, 2007	Kitt Peak	Spacewatch	·	1.6 km	MPC · JPL
284516	2007 RJ_{48}	—	September 9, 2007	Mount Lemmon	Mount Lemmon Survey	AGN	1.4 km	MPC · JPL
284517	2007 RO_{64}	—	September 10, 2007	Mount Lemmon	Mount Lemmon Survey	·	1.6 km	MPC · JPL
284518	2007 RY_{66}	—	September 10, 2007	Mount Lemmon	Mount Lemmon Survey	·	1.8 km	MPC · JPL
284519	2007 RD_{80}	—	September 10, 2007	Mount Lemmon	Mount Lemmon Survey	·	2.5 km	MPC · JPL
284520	2007 RB_{96}	—	September 10, 2007	Kitt Peak	Spacewatch	KOR	2.0 km	MPC · JPL
284521	2007 RN_{96}	—	September 10, 2007	Kitt Peak	Spacewatch	·	2.6 km	MPC · JPL
284522	2007 RT_{97}	—	September 10, 2007	Kitt Peak	Spacewatch	·	1.3 km	MPC · JPL
284523	2007 RM_{113}	—	September 11, 2007	Catalina	CSS	·	1.9 km	MPC · JPL
284524	2007 RH_{120}	—	September 11, 2007	Črni Vrh	B. Mikuž, H. Mikuž	·	3.0 km	MPC · JPL
284525	2007 RP_{123}	—	September 12, 2007	Mount Lemmon	Mount Lemmon Survey	·	1.6 km	MPC · JPL
284526	2007 RN_{135}	—	September 13, 2007	Mount Lemmon	Mount Lemmon Survey	·	3.4 km	MPC · JPL
284527	2007 RU_{137}	—	September 14, 2007	Anderson Mesa	LONEOS	·	1.8 km	MPC · JPL
284528	2007 RQ_{138}	—	September 15, 2007	Lulin	LUSS	·	1.8 km	MPC · JPL
284529	2007 RM_{139}	—	September 7, 2007	Socorro	LINEAR	(1547)	2.0 km	MPC · JPL
284530	2007 RS_{145}	—	September 14, 2007	Socorro	LINEAR	·	2.9 km	MPC · JPL
284531	2007 RB_{148}	—	September 11, 2007	Purple Mountain	PMO NEO Survey Program	(5)	1.3 km	MPC · JPL
284532	2007 RW_{157}	—	September 11, 2007	Purple Mountain	PMO NEO Survey Program	·	2.4 km	MPC · JPL
284533	2007 RW_{170}	—	September 10, 2007	Kitt Peak	Spacewatch	·	2.0 km	MPC · JPL
284534	2007 RZ_{172}	—	September 10, 2007	Kitt Peak	Spacewatch	·	1.9 km	MPC · JPL
284535	2007 RW_{177}	—	September 10, 2007	Kitt Peak	Spacewatch	·	2.2 km	MPC · JPL
284536	2007 RJ_{189}	—	September 10, 2007	Kitt Peak	Spacewatch	MRX	1.4 km	MPC · JPL
284537	2007 RT_{199}	—	September 13, 2007	Kitt Peak	Spacewatch	HOF	3.1 km	MPC · JPL
284538	2007 RA_{204}	—	September 9, 2007	Kitt Peak	Spacewatch	·	1.8 km	MPC · JPL
284539	2007 RV_{204}	—	September 9, 2007	Kitt Peak	Spacewatch	·	1.3 km	MPC · JPL
284540	2007 RA_{217}	—	September 13, 2007	Mount Lemmon	Mount Lemmon Survey	·	1.5 km	MPC · JPL
284541	2007 RD_{218}	—	September 13, 2007	Mount Lemmon	Mount Lemmon Survey	KOR	1.8 km	MPC · JPL
284542	2007 RF_{244}	—	September 15, 2007	Socorro	LINEAR	·	2.4 km	MPC · JPL
284543	2007 RC_{250}	—	September 13, 2007	Kitt Peak	Spacewatch	·	3.4 km	MPC · JPL
284544	2007 RC_{252}	—	September 13, 2007	Kitt Peak	Spacewatch	·	2.0 km	MPC · JPL
284545	2007 RV_{270}	—	September 15, 2007	Kitt Peak	Spacewatch	·	1.9 km	MPC · JPL
284546	2007 RX_{277}	—	September 5, 2007	Catalina	CSS	·	2.5 km	MPC · JPL
284547	2007 RK_{278}	—	September 5, 2007	Catalina	CSS	·	2.7 km	MPC · JPL
284548	2007 RL_{279}	—	September 6, 2007	Siding Spring	SSS	·	1.7 km	MPC · JPL
284549	2007 RJ_{284}	—	September 11, 2007	Mount Lemmon	Mount Lemmon Survey	·	1.9 km	MPC · JPL
284550	2007 RF_{293}	—	September 13, 2007	Mount Lemmon	Mount Lemmon Survey	·	1.7 km	MPC · JPL
284551	2007 RM_{301}	—	September 13, 2007	Mount Lemmon	Mount Lemmon Survey	·	1.6 km	MPC · JPL
284552	2007 RY_{317}	—	September 10, 2007	Kitt Peak	Spacewatch	·	1.9 km	MPC · JPL
284553	2007 RD_{319}	—	September 12, 2007	Catalina	CSS	CYB	6.1 km	MPC · JPL
284554	2007 RM_{324}	—	September 15, 2007	Mount Lemmon	Mount Lemmon Survey	·	3.5 km	MPC · JPL
284555	2007 SS_{9}	—	September 18, 2007	Kitt Peak	Spacewatch	·	2.8 km	MPC · JPL
284556	2007 SD_{11}	—	September 22, 2007	Sandlot	G. Hug	·	1.8 km	MPC · JPL
284557	2007 SA_{13}	—	September 19, 2007	Kitt Peak	Spacewatch	·	1.7 km	MPC · JPL
284558	2007 SZ_{21}	—	September 21, 2007	Socorro	LINEAR	·	2.7 km	MPC · JPL
284559	2007 TD_{3}	—	October 5, 2007	Prairie Grass	Mahony, J.	·	2.1 km	MPC · JPL
284560	2007 TN_{6}	—	October 6, 2007	Dauban	Chante-Perdrix	·	4.7 km	MPC · JPL
284561	2007 TN_{30}	—	October 4, 2007	Kitt Peak	Spacewatch	·	3.2 km	MPC · JPL
284562	2007 TH_{32}	—	October 6, 2007	Kitt Peak	Spacewatch	·	1.2 km	MPC · JPL
284563	2007 TR_{35}	—	October 7, 2007	Catalina	CSS	·	1.6 km	MPC · JPL
284564	2007 TV_{45}	—	October 7, 2007	Catalina	CSS	·	3.0 km	MPC · JPL
284565	2007 TR_{46}	—	October 4, 2007	Kitt Peak	Spacewatch	HOF	3.2 km	MPC · JPL
284566	2007 TJ_{50}	—	October 4, 2007	Kitt Peak	Spacewatch	·	2.1 km	MPC · JPL
284567	2007 TH_{52}	—	October 4, 2007	Kitt Peak	Spacewatch	KOR	1.7 km	MPC · JPL
284568	2007 TH_{54}	—	October 4, 2007	Kitt Peak	Spacewatch	fast	3.1 km	MPC · JPL
284569	2007 TD_{55}	—	October 4, 2007	Kitt Peak	Spacewatch	·	3.0 km	MPC · JPL
284570	2007 TR_{55}	—	October 4, 2007	Kitt Peak	Spacewatch	KOR	1.7 km	MPC · JPL
284571	2007 TR_{56}	—	October 4, 2007	Kitt Peak	Spacewatch	·	2.0 km	MPC · JPL
284572	2007 TE_{57}	—	October 4, 2007	Kitt Peak	Spacewatch	·	3.7 km	MPC · JPL
284573	2007 TP_{60}	—	October 6, 2007	Kitt Peak	Spacewatch	·	2.4 km	MPC · JPL
284574	2007 TN_{67}	—	October 7, 2007	Catalina	CSS	·	2.1 km	MPC · JPL
284575	2007 TC_{71}	—	October 13, 2007	Kitami	K. Endate	EUN	1.7 km	MPC · JPL
284576	2007 TD_{92}	—	October 4, 2007	Purple Mountain	PMO NEO Survey Program	·	1.8 km	MPC · JPL
284577	2007 TQ_{94}	—	October 7, 2007	Catalina	CSS	·	2.3 km	MPC · JPL
284578	2007 TH_{100}	—	October 8, 2007	Mount Lemmon	Mount Lemmon Survey	KOR	1.5 km	MPC · JPL
284579	2007 TT_{102}	—	October 8, 2007	Mount Lemmon	Mount Lemmon Survey	·	3.6 km	MPC · JPL
284580	2007 TX_{104}	—	October 8, 2007	Mount Lemmon	Mount Lemmon Survey	KOR	1.6 km	MPC · JPL
284581	2007 TK_{132}	—	October 7, 2007	Mount Lemmon	Mount Lemmon Survey	·	1.7 km	MPC · JPL
284582	2007 TY_{139}	—	October 9, 2007	Catalina	CSS	·	2.2 km	MPC · JPL
284583	2007 TQ_{148}	—	October 7, 2007	Socorro	LINEAR	·	2.0 km	MPC · JPL
284584	2007 TR_{152}	—	October 9, 2007	Socorro	LINEAR	NEM	2.7 km	MPC · JPL
284585	2007 TX_{176}	—	October 6, 2007	Kitt Peak	Spacewatch	·	2.2 km	MPC · JPL
284586	2007 TR_{182}	—	October 8, 2007	Anderson Mesa	LONEOS	·	2.4 km	MPC · JPL
284587	2007 TD_{186}	—	October 13, 2007	Socorro	LINEAR	·	2.4 km	MPC · JPL
284588	2007 TD_{193}	—	October 6, 2007	Kitt Peak	Spacewatch	·	1.5 km	MPC · JPL
284589	2007 TJ_{193}	—	October 6, 2007	Kitt Peak	Spacewatch	·	2.9 km	MPC · JPL
284590	2007 TL_{195}	—	October 7, 2007	Mount Lemmon	Mount Lemmon Survey	KOR	1.5 km	MPC · JPL
284591	2007 TT_{199}	—	October 8, 2007	Kitt Peak	Spacewatch	·	2.4 km	MPC · JPL
284592	2007 TM_{216}	—	October 7, 2007	Kitt Peak	Spacewatch	(5)	1.7 km	MPC · JPL
284593	2007 TG_{241}	—	October 7, 2007	Mount Lemmon	Mount Lemmon Survey	·	2.2 km	MPC · JPL
284594	2007 TY_{273}	—	October 10, 2007	Mount Lemmon	Mount Lemmon Survey	·	2.0 km	MPC · JPL
284595	2007 TJ_{283}	—	October 8, 2007	Mount Lemmon	Mount Lemmon Survey	·	2.0 km	MPC · JPL
284596	2007 TX_{321}	—	October 8, 2007	Catalina	CSS	·	2.2 km	MPC · JPL
284597	2007 TP_{343}	—	October 10, 2007	Mount Lemmon	Mount Lemmon Survey	AGN	1.5 km	MPC · JPL
284598	2007 TN_{372}	—	October 13, 2007	Anderson Mesa	LONEOS	·	3.8 km	MPC · JPL
284599	2007 TE_{382}	—	October 14, 2007	Kitt Peak	Spacewatch	EOS	2.5 km	MPC · JPL
284600	2007 TB_{414}	—	October 15, 2007	Catalina	CSS	·	3.2 km	MPC · JPL

== 284601–284700 ==
back to top

Designation			Discovery			Properties		Ref
Permanent	Provisional	Named after	Date	Site	Discoverer(s)	Category	Diam.	Ref
284601	2007 TH_{418}	—	October 4, 2007	Kitt Peak	Spacewatch	KOR	1.7 km	MPC · JPL
284602	2007 TJ_{418}	—	October 4, 2007	Kitt Peak	Spacewatch	KOR	1.3 km	MPC · JPL
284603	2007 TL_{418}	—	October 4, 2007	Kitt Peak	Spacewatch	·	2.4 km	MPC · JPL
284604	2007 TC_{423}	—	October 4, 2007	Kitt Peak	Spacewatch	AGN	1.4 km	MPC · JPL
284605	2007 TX_{426}	—	October 9, 2007	Kitt Peak	Spacewatch	·	3.1 km	MPC · JPL
284606	2007 TJ_{427}	—	October 10, 2007	Catalina	CSS	·	3.0 km	MPC · JPL
284607	2007 TG_{429}	—	October 12, 2007	Kitt Peak	Spacewatch	KOR	1.5 km	MPC · JPL
284608	2007 TE_{443}	—	October 13, 2007	Catalina	CSS	·	2.7 km	MPC · JPL
284609	2007 TH_{444}	—	October 7, 2007	Catalina	CSS	MRX	1.1 km	MPC · JPL
284610	2007 TP_{449}	—	October 10, 2007	Catalina	CSS	·	3.5 km	MPC · JPL
284611	2007 UR_{5}	—	October 16, 2007	Purple Mountain	PMO NEO Survey Program	GAL	2.4 km	MPC · JPL
284612	2007 UF_{29}	—	October 18, 2007	Mount Lemmon	Mount Lemmon Survey	(12739)	1.8 km	MPC · JPL
284613	2007 UC_{60}	—	October 30, 2007	Mount Lemmon	Mount Lemmon Survey	KOR	1.6 km	MPC · JPL
284614	2007 UW_{65}	—	October 30, 2007	Catalina	CSS	·	1.9 km	MPC · JPL
284615	2007 UC_{66}	—	October 20, 2007	Kitt Peak	Spacewatch	KOR	1.6 km	MPC · JPL
284616	2007 UD_{72}	—	October 31, 2007	Mount Lemmon	Mount Lemmon Survey	KOR	1.4 km	MPC · JPL
284617	2007 UL_{96}	—	October 30, 2007	Kitt Peak	Spacewatch	·	2.2 km	MPC · JPL
284618	2007 UR_{98}	—	October 30, 2007	Kitt Peak	Spacewatch	·	2.3 km	MPC · JPL
284619	2007 UX_{123}	—	October 31, 2007	Catalina	CSS	·	2.2 km	MPC · JPL
284620	2007 UW_{126}	—	October 20, 2007	Mount Lemmon	Mount Lemmon Survey	·	2.1 km	MPC · JPL
284621	2007 UU_{130}	—	October 20, 2007	Mount Lemmon	Mount Lemmon Survey	·	2.2 km	MPC · JPL
284622	2007 VN_{47}	—	November 1, 2007	Kitt Peak	Spacewatch	NAE	3.4 km	MPC · JPL
284623	2007 VF_{52}	—	November 1, 2007	Kitt Peak	Spacewatch	·	1.9 km	MPC · JPL
284624	2007 VH_{85}	—	November 2, 2007	Socorro	LINEAR	·	3.2 km	MPC · JPL
284625	2007 VS_{106}	—	November 3, 2007	Kitt Peak	Spacewatch	·	2.2 km	MPC · JPL
284626	2007 VR_{153}	—	November 4, 2007	Kitt Peak	Spacewatch	PAD	1.8 km	MPC · JPL
284627	2007 VP_{162}	—	November 5, 2007	Kitt Peak	Spacewatch	·	4.5 km	MPC · JPL
284628	2007 VL_{176}	—	November 5, 2007	Mount Lemmon	Mount Lemmon Survey	HOF	2.6 km	MPC · JPL
284629	2007 VU_{180}	—	November 7, 2007	Catalina	CSS	·	2.1 km	MPC · JPL
284630	2007 VO_{186}	—	November 11, 2007	Bisei SG Center	BATTeRS	·	2.3 km	MPC · JPL
284631	2007 VF_{217}	—	November 9, 2007	Kitt Peak	Spacewatch	·	1.8 km	MPC · JPL
284632	2007 VK_{227}	—	November 12, 2007	Catalina	CSS	HYG	4.1 km	MPC · JPL
284633	2007 VS_{265}	—	November 13, 2007	Catalina	CSS	·	3.2 km	MPC · JPL
284634	2007 VK_{267}	—	November 13, 2007	Calvin-Rehoboth	Calvin College	HIL · 3:2 · (6124)	6.9 km	MPC · JPL
284635	2007 VY_{267}	—	November 11, 2007	Socorro	LINEAR	·	2.9 km	MPC · JPL
284636	2007 VQ_{278}	—	November 14, 2007	Kitt Peak	Spacewatch	EUP	5.2 km	MPC · JPL
284637	2007 VO_{303}	—	November 3, 2007	Catalina	CSS	·	2.3 km	MPC · JPL
284638	2007 VR_{321}	—	November 5, 2007	Kitt Peak	Spacewatch	·	5.9 km	MPC · JPL
284639	2007 VB_{323}	—	November 2, 2007	Socorro	LINEAR	·	7.4 km	MPC · JPL
284640	2007 VM_{323}	—	November 3, 2007	Socorro	LINEAR	·	3.3 km	MPC · JPL
284641	2007 VM_{325}	—	November 2, 2007	Kitt Peak	Spacewatch	EOS	2.3 km	MPC · JPL
284642	2007 VU_{325}	—	November 2, 2007	Socorro	LINEAR	EOS	2.7 km	MPC · JPL
284643	2007 VD_{326}	—	November 3, 2007	Mount Lemmon	Mount Lemmon Survey	·	2.3 km	MPC · JPL
284644	2007 VZ_{333}	—	December 5, 2007	Anderson Mesa	LONEOS	·	4.5 km	MPC · JPL
284645	2007 VN_{334}	—	November 14, 2007	Socorro	LINEAR	·	2.5 km	MPC · JPL
284646	2007 WL_{9}	—	November 16, 2007	Mount Lemmon	Mount Lemmon Survey	·	2.3 km	MPC · JPL
284647	2007 WG_{27}	—	November 18, 2007	Mount Lemmon	Mount Lemmon Survey	EOS	3.2 km	MPC · JPL
284648	2007 WK_{59}	—	November 20, 2007	Kitt Peak	Spacewatch	·	2.1 km	MPC · JPL
284649	2007 WO_{63}	—	August 14, 2002	Palomar	NEAT	·	3.1 km	MPC · JPL
284650	2007 XK_{1}	—	December 3, 2007	Catalina	CSS	·	5.1 km	MPC · JPL
284651	2007 XO_{6}	—	December 4, 2007	Catalina	CSS	·	3.7 km	MPC · JPL
284652	2007 XE_{28}	—	December 14, 2007	Purple Mountain	PMO NEO Survey Program	URS	5.8 km	MPC · JPL
284653	2007 YO_{3}	—	December 16, 2007	Kitt Peak	Spacewatch	·	2.2 km	MPC · JPL
284654	2007 YE_{40}	—	December 30, 2007	Catalina	CSS	·	6.2 km	MPC · JPL
284655	2007 YU_{47}	—	December 30, 2007	Costitx	OAM	·	4.2 km	MPC · JPL
284656	2008 AB_{20}	—	January 10, 2008	Catalina	CSS	·	2.9 km	MPC · JPL
284657	2008 AM_{32}	—	January 12, 2008	Bisei SG Center	BATTeRS	EUP	5.8 km	MPC · JPL
284658	2008 AZ_{103}	—	January 15, 2008	Kitt Peak	Spacewatch	·	5.3 km	MPC · JPL
284659	2008 BO_{6}	—	January 16, 2008	Kitt Peak	Spacewatch	·	3.7 km	MPC · JPL
284660	2008 BQ_{32}	—	January 30, 2008	Catalina	CSS	EUP	4.6 km	MPC · JPL
284661	2008 CK_{20}	—	February 6, 2008	Catalina	CSS	·	5.0 km	MPC · JPL
284662	2008 CE_{28}	—	February 2, 2008	Kitt Peak	Spacewatch	CYB	4.0 km	MPC · JPL
284663	2008 FD_{63}	—	March 27, 2008	Kitt Peak	Spacewatch	L5	10 km	MPC · JPL
284664	2008 FW_{132}	—	March 30, 2008	Kitt Peak	Spacewatch	L5	10 km	MPC · JPL
284665	2008 FW_{134}	—	March 30, 2008	Kitt Peak	Spacewatch	L5	10 km	MPC · JPL
284666	2008 GP_{42}	—	April 4, 2008	Kitt Peak	Spacewatch	L5	10 km	MPC · JPL
284667	2008 GJ_{74}	—	April 7, 2008	Kitt Peak	Spacewatch	L5	10 km	MPC · JPL
284668	2008 JA_{23}	—	May 7, 2008	Kitt Peak	Spacewatch	·	1.9 km	MPC · JPL
284669	2008 OQ_{24}	—	July 31, 2008	La Sagra	OAM	AGN	1.6 km	MPC · JPL
284670	2008 QG_{5}	—	August 22, 2008	Kitt Peak	Spacewatch	·	940 m	MPC · JPL
284671	2008 QG_{14}	—	August 21, 2008	Kitt Peak	Spacewatch	·	610 m	MPC · JPL
284672	2008 QA_{44}	—	August 27, 2008	La Sagra	OAM	EOS	3.0 km	MPC · JPL
284673	2008 RC_{11}	—	September 3, 2008	Kitt Peak	Spacewatch	·	1.5 km	MPC · JPL
284674	2008 RV_{46}	—	September 2, 2008	Kitt Peak	Spacewatch	·	860 m	MPC · JPL
284675	2008 RA_{70}	—	September 5, 2008	Kitt Peak	Spacewatch	·	850 m	MPC · JPL
284676	2008 RX_{89}	—	September 5, 2008	Kitt Peak	Spacewatch	·	790 m	MPC · JPL
284677	2008 RQ_{95}	—	September 7, 2008	Catalina	CSS	·	750 m	MPC · JPL
284678	2008 RN_{97}	—	September 7, 2008	Mount Lemmon	Mount Lemmon Survey	·	1.9 km	MPC · JPL
284679	2008 RA_{103}	—	September 4, 2008	Kitt Peak	Spacewatch	(2076)	800 m	MPC · JPL
284680	2008 RP_{120}	—	September 5, 2008	Kitt Peak	Spacewatch	V	970 m	MPC · JPL
284681	2008 RN_{123}	—	September 6, 2008	Kitt Peak	Spacewatch	KOR	1.5 km	MPC · JPL
284682	2008 RJ_{134}	—	September 7, 2008	Catalina	CSS	·	1.2 km	MPC · JPL
284683	2008 SX_{4}	—	September 22, 2008	Socorro	LINEAR	·	990 m	MPC · JPL
284684	2008 SS_{6}	—	September 22, 2008	Socorro	LINEAR	·	840 m	MPC · JPL
284685	2008 SY_{28}	—	September 19, 2008	Kitt Peak	Spacewatch	(2076)	880 m	MPC · JPL
284686	2008 SU_{31}	—	September 20, 2008	Kitt Peak	Spacewatch	·	950 m	MPC · JPL
284687	2008 SF_{32}	—	September 20, 2008	Kitt Peak	Spacewatch	·	770 m	MPC · JPL
284688	2008 SS_{32}	—	September 20, 2008	Kitt Peak	Spacewatch	·	940 m	MPC · JPL
284689	2008 SO_{45}	—	September 20, 2008	Kitt Peak	Spacewatch	V	900 m	MPC · JPL
284690	2008 SR_{64}	—	September 21, 2008	Mount Lemmon	Mount Lemmon Survey	·	700 m	MPC · JPL
284691	2008 SY_{71}	—	September 22, 2008	Mount Lemmon	Mount Lemmon Survey	·	1.1 km	MPC · JPL
284692	2008 SO_{89}	—	September 21, 2008	Kitt Peak	Spacewatch	·	720 m	MPC · JPL
284693	2008 SR_{89}	—	September 21, 2008	Kitt Peak	Spacewatch	·	840 m	MPC · JPL
284694	2008 SU_{96}	—	September 21, 2008	Kitt Peak	Spacewatch	·	1.5 km	MPC · JPL
284695	2008 SJ_{136}	—	September 23, 2008	Kitt Peak	Spacewatch	ERI	2.5 km	MPC · JPL
284696	2008 SL_{158}	—	September 24, 2008	Socorro	LINEAR	·	960 m	MPC · JPL
284697	2008 SA_{174}	—	September 22, 2008	Catalina	CSS	·	1.9 km	MPC · JPL
284698	2008 SB_{187}	—	September 25, 2008	Kitt Peak	Spacewatch	·	740 m	MPC · JPL
284699	2008 SY_{267}	—	September 23, 2008	Mount Lemmon	Mount Lemmon Survey	·	1.2 km	MPC · JPL
284700	2008 SF_{271}	—	September 29, 2008	Catalina	CSS	·	920 m	MPC · JPL

== 284701–284800 ==
back to top

Designation			Discovery			Properties		Ref
Permanent	Provisional	Named after	Date	Site	Discoverer(s)	Category	Diam.	Ref
284701	2008 SO_{277}	—	September 24, 2008	Mount Lemmon	Mount Lemmon Survey	·	1.7 km	MPC · JPL
284702	2008 SX_{280}	—	September 29, 2008	Mount Lemmon	Mount Lemmon Survey	(5)	1.5 km	MPC · JPL
284703	2008 SJ_{281}	—	September 25, 2008	Mount Lemmon	Mount Lemmon Survey	·	2.3 km	MPC · JPL
284704	2008 SO_{282}	—	September 22, 2008	Kitt Peak	Spacewatch	·	1.5 km	MPC · JPL
284705	2008 SX_{298}	—	September 22, 2008	Kitt Peak	Spacewatch	·	730 m	MPC · JPL
284706	2008 SY_{301}	—	September 23, 2008	Mount Lemmon	Mount Lemmon Survey	·	650 m	MPC · JPL
284707	2008 TA_{22}	—	October 1, 2008	Mount Lemmon	Mount Lemmon Survey	·	770 m	MPC · JPL
284708	2008 TB_{70}	—	October 2, 2008	Kitt Peak	Spacewatch	·	1.5 km	MPC · JPL
284709	2008 TK_{90}	—	October 3, 2008	Kitt Peak	Spacewatch	·	780 m	MPC · JPL
284710	2008 TH_{105}	—	October 6, 2008	Kitt Peak	Spacewatch	·	830 m	MPC · JPL
284711	2008 TL_{120}	—	October 7, 2008	Mount Lemmon	Mount Lemmon Survey	·	840 m	MPC · JPL
284712	2008 TE_{124}	—	October 8, 2008	Mount Lemmon	Mount Lemmon Survey	·	770 m	MPC · JPL
284713	2008 TC_{133}	—	October 8, 2008	Mount Lemmon	Mount Lemmon Survey	·	1.1 km	MPC · JPL
284714	2008 TL_{134}	—	October 8, 2008	Kitt Peak	Spacewatch	V	800 m	MPC · JPL
284715	2008 TR_{139}	—	October 8, 2008	Mount Lemmon	Mount Lemmon Survey	NYS	1.1 km	MPC · JPL
284716	2008 TM_{150}	—	October 9, 2008	Mount Lemmon	Mount Lemmon Survey	·	760 m	MPC · JPL
284717	2008 TE_{166}	—	October 6, 2008	Mount Lemmon	Mount Lemmon Survey	·	590 m	MPC · JPL
284718	2008 TO_{181}	—	October 1, 2008	Socorro	LINEAR	·	880 m	MPC · JPL
284719	2008 TK_{186}	—	October 7, 2008	Mount Lemmon	Mount Lemmon Survey	·	2.1 km	MPC · JPL
284720	2008 UV_{23}	—	October 20, 2008	Kitt Peak	Spacewatch	·	3.4 km	MPC · JPL
284721	2008 UW_{25}	—	October 20, 2008	Mount Lemmon	Mount Lemmon Survey	MAS	1.0 km	MPC · JPL
284722	2008 UT_{33}	—	October 20, 2008	Mount Lemmon	Mount Lemmon Survey	·	670 m	MPC · JPL
284723	2008 UC_{39}	—	October 20, 2008	Kitt Peak	Spacewatch	·	1.7 km	MPC · JPL
284724	2008 UL_{55}	—	October 21, 2008	Kitt Peak	Spacewatch	MAS	980 m	MPC · JPL
284725	2008 UT_{77}	—	October 21, 2008	Mount Lemmon	Mount Lemmon Survey	(2076)	850 m	MPC · JPL
284726	2008 UE_{111}	—	October 22, 2008	Kitt Peak	Spacewatch	·	760 m	MPC · JPL
284727	2008 UG_{119}	—	October 22, 2008	Kitt Peak	Spacewatch	·	1.6 km	MPC · JPL
284728	2008 UE_{127}	—	October 22, 2008	Kitt Peak	Spacewatch	MAS	840 m	MPC · JPL
284729	2008 UX_{129}	—	October 23, 2008	Kitt Peak	Spacewatch	·	980 m	MPC · JPL
284730	2008 UY_{138}	—	October 23, 2008	Kitt Peak	Spacewatch	·	1.2 km	MPC · JPL
284731	2008 US_{141}	—	October 23, 2008	Kitt Peak	Spacewatch	·	1.0 km	MPC · JPL
284732	2008 UY_{144}	—	October 23, 2008	Kitt Peak	Spacewatch	·	2.2 km	MPC · JPL
284733	2008 UO_{147}	—	October 23, 2008	Kitt Peak	Spacewatch	V	680 m	MPC · JPL
284734	2008 UP_{152}	—	October 23, 2008	Mount Lemmon	Mount Lemmon Survey	·	1.1 km	MPC · JPL
284735	2008 UQ_{152}	—	October 23, 2008	Mount Lemmon	Mount Lemmon Survey	·	1.5 km	MPC · JPL
284736	2008 UT_{178}	—	October 24, 2008	Mount Lemmon	Mount Lemmon Survey	·	1.0 km	MPC · JPL
284737	2008 UM_{179}	—	October 24, 2008	Kitt Peak	Spacewatch	·	1.3 km	MPC · JPL
284738	2008 UZ_{180}	—	October 24, 2008	Kitt Peak	Spacewatch	·	2.2 km	MPC · JPL
284739	2008 UA_{197}	—	October 27, 2008	Kitt Peak	Spacewatch	·	1.9 km	MPC · JPL
284740	2008 UH_{198}	—	October 25, 2008	Socorro	LINEAR	·	970 m	MPC · JPL
284741	2008 UL_{203}	—	October 28, 2008	Socorro	LINEAR	·	1.4 km	MPC · JPL
284742	2008 UT_{203}	—	October 28, 2008	Socorro	LINEAR	·	1.0 km	MPC · JPL
284743	2008 UJ_{208}	—	October 23, 2008	Kitt Peak	Spacewatch	·	1.4 km	MPC · JPL
284744	2008 UU_{211}	—	October 23, 2008	Mount Lemmon	Mount Lemmon Survey	·	1.3 km	MPC · JPL
284745	2008 US_{240}	—	October 26, 2008	Kitt Peak	Spacewatch	·	1.6 km	MPC · JPL
284746	2008 UV_{299}	—	October 29, 2008	Kitt Peak	Spacewatch	·	1.4 km	MPC · JPL
284747	2008 UD_{305}	—	October 29, 2008	Kitt Peak	Spacewatch	EOS	2.9 km	MPC · JPL
284748	2008 UJ_{329}	—	October 31, 2008	Kitt Peak	Spacewatch	·	640 m	MPC · JPL
284749	2008 UP_{360}	—	October 28, 2008	Kitt Peak	Spacewatch	·	1.2 km	MPC · JPL
284750	2008 UN_{361}	—	October 31, 2008	Catalina	CSS	MAR	1.8 km	MPC · JPL
284751	2008 UE_{368}	—	October 31, 2008	Socorro	LINEAR	·	1.5 km	MPC · JPL
284752	2008 VF_{2}	—	November 2, 2008	Socorro	LINEAR	·	640 m	MPC · JPL
284753	2008 VK_{11}	—	November 2, 2008	Mount Lemmon	Mount Lemmon Survey	·	920 m	MPC · JPL
284754	2008 VD_{13}	—	November 6, 2008	Andrushivka	Andrushivka	·	780 m	MPC · JPL
284755	2008 VZ_{22}	—	November 1, 2008	Mount Lemmon	Mount Lemmon Survey	·	2.6 km	MPC · JPL
284756	2008 VA_{24}	—	November 1, 2008	Kitt Peak	Spacewatch	·	1.8 km	MPC · JPL
284757	2008 VV_{25}	—	November 2, 2008	Kitt Peak	Spacewatch	·	1.6 km	MPC · JPL
284758	2008 VN_{64}	—	November 10, 2008	La Sagra	OAM	·	1.6 km	MPC · JPL
284759	2008 WT_{2}	—	November 18, 2008	Dauban	Kugel, F.	·	1.7 km	MPC · JPL
284760	2008 WO_{3}	—	November 17, 2008	Kitt Peak	Spacewatch	·	1.7 km	MPC · JPL
284761	2008 WK_{21}	—	November 17, 2008	Kitt Peak	Spacewatch	·	1.3 km	MPC · JPL
284762	2008 WN_{41}	—	November 17, 2008	Kitt Peak	Spacewatch	·	1.4 km	MPC · JPL
284763	2008 WL_{68}	—	November 18, 2008	Kitt Peak	Spacewatch	·	740 m	MPC · JPL
284764	2008 WT_{69}	—	November 18, 2008	Kitt Peak	Spacewatch	·	3.3 km	MPC · JPL
284765	2008 WK_{70}	—	November 18, 2008	Kitt Peak	Spacewatch	·	1.2 km	MPC · JPL
284766	2008 WX_{73}	—	November 19, 2008	Mount Lemmon	Mount Lemmon Survey	·	1.5 km	MPC · JPL
284767	2008 WL_{101}	—	November 27, 2008	Črni Vrh	J. Vales, B. Mikuž	HNS	1.7 km	MPC · JPL
284768	2008 WM_{110}	—	November 30, 2008	Kitt Peak	Spacewatch	·	1.7 km	MPC · JPL
284769	2008 WP_{115}	—	November 30, 2008	Kitt Peak	Spacewatch	MAS	720 m	MPC · JPL
284770	2008 WC_{119}	—	November 30, 2008	Mount Lemmon	Mount Lemmon Survey	·	1.9 km	MPC · JPL
284771	2008 WW_{120}	—	November 30, 2008	Kitt Peak	Spacewatch	·	2.7 km	MPC · JPL
284772	2008 WM_{121}	—	November 30, 2008	Kitt Peak	Spacewatch	TEL	2.2 km	MPC · JPL
284773	2008 WN_{121}	—	November 30, 2008	Kitt Peak	Spacewatch	·	4.6 km	MPC · JPL
284774	2008 WC_{126}	—	November 24, 2008	Mount Lemmon	Mount Lemmon Survey	·	2.1 km	MPC · JPL
284775	2008 WP_{138}	—	November 18, 2008	Socorro	LINEAR	·	1.1 km	MPC · JPL
284776	2008 XC_{3}	—	December 2, 2008	Dauban	Kugel, F.	·	2.5 km	MPC · JPL
284777	2008 XT_{3}	—	December 2, 2008	Socorro	LINEAR	NYS	1.1 km	MPC · JPL
284778	2008 XH_{35}	—	December 2, 2008	Kitt Peak	Spacewatch	·	1.8 km	MPC · JPL
284779	2008 XH_{49}	—	December 7, 2008	Mount Lemmon	Mount Lemmon Survey	·	1.7 km	MPC · JPL
284780	2008 XO_{52}	—	December 2, 2008	Kitt Peak	Spacewatch	·	2.4 km	MPC · JPL
284781	2008 YK_{13}	—	December 21, 2008	Mount Lemmon	Mount Lemmon Survey	·	2.5 km	MPC · JPL
284782	2008 YA_{21}	—	December 21, 2008	Mount Lemmon	Mount Lemmon Survey	HOF	3.5 km	MPC · JPL
284783	2008 YT_{35}	—	December 22, 2008	Kitt Peak	Spacewatch	·	1.5 km	MPC · JPL
284784	2008 YH_{38}	—	December 29, 2008	Kitt Peak	Spacewatch	·	1.5 km	MPC · JPL
284785	2008 YP_{40}	—	December 29, 2008	Mount Lemmon	Mount Lemmon Survey	·	3.3 km	MPC · JPL
284786	2008 YO_{49}	—	December 29, 2008	Mount Lemmon	Mount Lemmon Survey	·	2.5 km	MPC · JPL
284787	2008 YF_{51}	—	December 29, 2008	Mount Lemmon	Mount Lemmon Survey	·	3.7 km	MPC · JPL
284788	2008 YT_{53}	—	December 29, 2008	Mount Lemmon	Mount Lemmon Survey	HOF	3.3 km	MPC · JPL
284789	2008 YZ_{56}	—	December 30, 2008	Kitt Peak	Spacewatch	·	2.6 km	MPC · JPL
284790	2008 YW_{75}	—	December 30, 2008	Mount Lemmon	Mount Lemmon Survey	·	2.8 km	MPC · JPL
284791	2008 YG_{78}	—	December 30, 2008	Mount Lemmon	Mount Lemmon Survey	·	1.9 km	MPC · JPL
284792	2008 YW_{79}	—	December 30, 2008	Mount Lemmon	Mount Lemmon Survey	EOS	2.4 km	MPC · JPL
284793	2008 YQ_{80}	—	December 30, 2008	Kitt Peak	Spacewatch	·	1.8 km	MPC · JPL
284794	2008 YH_{83}	—	December 31, 2008	Kitt Peak	Spacewatch	NYS	1.6 km	MPC · JPL
284795	2008 YS_{83}	—	December 31, 2008	Kitt Peak	Spacewatch	KOR	1.4 km	MPC · JPL
284796	2008 YA_{97}	—	December 29, 2008	Mount Lemmon	Mount Lemmon Survey	·	4.0 km	MPC · JPL
284797	2008 YB_{101}	—	December 29, 2008	Kitt Peak	Spacewatch	·	1.3 km	MPC · JPL
284798	2008 YT_{103}	—	December 29, 2008	Kitt Peak	Spacewatch	·	3.0 km	MPC · JPL
284799	2008 YC_{106}	—	December 29, 2008	Kitt Peak	Spacewatch	·	1.3 km	MPC · JPL
284800	2008 YS_{112}	—	December 31, 2008	Mount Lemmon	Mount Lemmon Survey	(5)	1.7 km	MPC · JPL

== 284801–284900 ==
back to top

Designation			Discovery			Properties		Ref
Permanent	Provisional	Named after	Date	Site	Discoverer(s)	Category	Diam.	Ref
284801	2008 YM_{113}	—	December 29, 2008	Kitt Peak	Spacewatch	·	1.7 km	MPC · JPL
284802	2008 YV_{117}	—	December 29, 2008	Mount Lemmon	Mount Lemmon Survey	·	2.8 km	MPC · JPL
284803	2008 YZ_{118}	—	December 29, 2008	Kitt Peak	Spacewatch	·	3.9 km	MPC · JPL
284804	2008 YH_{123}	—	December 30, 2008	Kitt Peak	Spacewatch	·	1.8 km	MPC · JPL
284805	2008 YL_{123}	—	December 30, 2008	Kitt Peak	Spacewatch	·	2.0 km	MPC · JPL
284806	2008 YZ_{123}	—	December 30, 2008	Kitt Peak	Spacewatch	(16286)	2.8 km	MPC · JPL
284807	2008 YH_{127}	—	December 30, 2008	Kitt Peak	Spacewatch	AGN	1.2 km	MPC · JPL
284808	2008 YL_{136}	—	December 30, 2008	Kitt Peak	Spacewatch	·	1.3 km	MPC · JPL
284809	2008 YS_{136}	—	December 30, 2008	Kitt Peak	Spacewatch	·	2.7 km	MPC · JPL
284810	2008 YA_{137}	—	December 30, 2008	Kitt Peak	Spacewatch	·	2.9 km	MPC · JPL
284811	2008 YT_{137}	—	December 30, 2008	Mount Lemmon	Mount Lemmon Survey	·	5.6 km	MPC · JPL
284812	2008 YY_{141}	—	December 30, 2008	Kitt Peak	Spacewatch	EUN	1.6 km	MPC · JPL
284813	2008 YA_{152}	—	December 22, 2008	Catalina	CSS	HNS	1.5 km	MPC · JPL
284814	2008 YE_{152}	—	December 22, 2008	Kitt Peak	Spacewatch	·	2.8 km	MPC · JPL
284815	2008 YM_{152}	—	December 29, 2008	Mount Lemmon	Mount Lemmon Survey	·	4.7 km	MPC · JPL
284816	2008 YJ_{153}	—	December 21, 2008	Kitt Peak	Spacewatch	·	1.3 km	MPC · JPL
284817	2008 YC_{161}	—	December 29, 2008	Mount Lemmon	Mount Lemmon Survey	·	3.4 km	MPC · JPL
284818	2008 YK_{163}	—	December 30, 2008	Mount Lemmon	Mount Lemmon Survey	NEM	2.4 km	MPC · JPL
284819	2008 YY_{165}	—	December 22, 2008	Mount Lemmon	Mount Lemmon Survey	·	3.0 km	MPC · JPL
284820	2008 YY_{166}	—	December 22, 2008	Catalina	CSS	·	4.2 km	MPC · JPL
284821	2008 YS_{170}	—	December 30, 2008	Catalina	CSS	BRG	2.0 km	MPC · JPL
284822	2008 YS_{172}	—	December 22, 2008	Kitt Peak	Spacewatch	·	3.8 km	MPC · JPL
284823	2009 AQ_{35}	—	January 15, 2009	Kitt Peak	Spacewatch	URS	4.1 km	MPC · JPL
284824	2009 AT_{35}	—	January 15, 2009	Kitt Peak	Spacewatch	EOS	2.0 km	MPC · JPL
284825	2009 AS_{42}	—	January 2, 2009	Mount Lemmon	Mount Lemmon Survey	·	1.7 km	MPC · JPL
284826	2009 AY_{42}	—	January 3, 2009	Mount Lemmon	Mount Lemmon Survey	EOS	3.0 km	MPC · JPL
284827	2009 AH_{44}	—	January 3, 2009	Mount Lemmon	Mount Lemmon Survey	·	2.1 km	MPC · JPL
284828	2009 AQ_{47}	—	January 7, 2009	Kitt Peak	Spacewatch	·	2.2 km	MPC · JPL
284829	2009 BZ_{3}	—	January 18, 2009	Socorro	LINEAR	·	3.7 km	MPC · JPL
284830	2009 BT_{8}	—	January 17, 2009	Socorro	LINEAR	·	2.0 km	MPC · JPL
284831	2009 BE_{16}	—	January 16, 2009	Mount Lemmon	Mount Lemmon Survey	·	940 m	MPC · JPL
284832	2009 BH_{17}	—	January 17, 2009	Mount Lemmon	Mount Lemmon Survey	·	2.5 km	MPC · JPL
284833	2009 BA_{38}	—	January 16, 2009	Kitt Peak	Spacewatch	(5)	1.7 km	MPC · JPL
284834	2009 BJ_{42}	—	January 16, 2009	Kitt Peak	Spacewatch	·	3.6 km	MPC · JPL
284835	2009 BW_{46}	—	January 16, 2009	Kitt Peak	Spacewatch	·	5.2 km	MPC · JPL
284836	2009 BP_{52}	—	January 16, 2009	Kitt Peak	Spacewatch	BRA	1.6 km	MPC · JPL
284837	2009 BR_{59}	—	January 16, 2009	Kitt Peak	Spacewatch	·	3.5 km	MPC · JPL
284838	2009 BK_{68}	—	January 23, 2009	Purple Mountain	PMO NEO Survey Program	·	1.4 km	MPC · JPL
284839	2009 BY_{68}	—	January 25, 2009	Kitt Peak	Spacewatch	VER	4.5 km	MPC · JPL
284840	2009 BR_{69}	—	January 25, 2009	Catalina	CSS	EUN	1.2 km	MPC · JPL
284841	2009 BH_{77}	—	January 25, 2009	Socorro	LINEAR	HNS	1.9 km	MPC · JPL
284842	2009 BT_{81}	—	January 29, 2009	Bergisch Gladbach	W. Bickel	·	1.3 km	MPC · JPL
284843	2009 BO_{82}	—	January 20, 2009	Catalina	CSS	ADE	3.2 km	MPC · JPL
284844	2009 BJ_{84}	—	January 25, 2009	Kitt Peak	Spacewatch	·	3.9 km	MPC · JPL
284845	2009 BG_{85}	—	January 25, 2009	Kitt Peak	Spacewatch	·	2.2 km	MPC · JPL
284846	2009 BM_{91}	—	January 25, 2009	Kitt Peak	Spacewatch	·	3.5 km	MPC · JPL
284847	2009 BD_{92}	—	January 25, 2009	Kitt Peak	Spacewatch	·	3.1 km	MPC · JPL
284848	2009 BQ_{93}	—	January 25, 2009	Kitt Peak	Spacewatch	·	3.4 km	MPC · JPL
284849	2009 BO_{94}	—	January 25, 2009	Kitt Peak	Spacewatch	·	2.7 km	MPC · JPL
284850	2009 BM_{105}	—	January 25, 2009	Kitt Peak	Spacewatch	VER	3.2 km	MPC · JPL
284851	2009 BQ_{122}	—	January 31, 2009	Kitt Peak	Spacewatch	·	4.6 km	MPC · JPL
284852	2009 BH_{128}	—	January 29, 2009	Mount Lemmon	Mount Lemmon Survey	·	4.3 km	MPC · JPL
284853	2009 BX_{136}	—	January 29, 2009	Kitt Peak	Spacewatch	EOS	2.7 km	MPC · JPL
284854	2009 BG_{140}	—	January 29, 2009	Kitt Peak	Spacewatch	·	1.2 km	MPC · JPL
284855	2009 BM_{143}	—	January 30, 2009	Kitt Peak	Spacewatch	·	2.1 km	MPC · JPL
284856	2009 BG_{147}	—	January 30, 2009	Mount Lemmon	Mount Lemmon Survey	·	3.4 km	MPC · JPL
284857	2009 BP_{158}	—	January 31, 2009	Kitt Peak	Spacewatch	EOS	2.8 km	MPC · JPL
284858	2009 BG_{161}	—	January 31, 2009	Kitt Peak	Spacewatch	EUN	1.4 km	MPC · JPL
284859	2009 BP_{167}	—	January 31, 2009	Cerro Burek	Burek, Cerro	·	4.1 km	MPC · JPL
284860	2009 BY_{176}	—	January 18, 2009	Kitt Peak	Spacewatch	BRG	1.6 km	MPC · JPL
284861	2009 BR_{177}	—	January 30, 2009	Mount Lemmon	Mount Lemmon Survey	EOS	2.2 km	MPC · JPL
284862	2009 BU_{189}	—	January 20, 2009	Mount Lemmon	Mount Lemmon Survey	·	3.4 km	MPC · JPL
284863	2009 CL_{2}	—	February 2, 2009	Moletai	K. Černis, Zdanavicius, J.	EOS	2.5 km	MPC · JPL
284864	2009 CV_{28}	—	February 1, 2009	Kitt Peak	Spacewatch	·	1.8 km	MPC · JPL
284865	2009 CP_{32}	—	February 1, 2009	Kitt Peak	Spacewatch	·	4.6 km	MPC · JPL
284866	2009 CG_{40}	—	February 14, 2009	Catalina	CSS	·	3.4 km	MPC · JPL
284867	2009 CU_{41}	—	February 13, 2009	Kitt Peak	Spacewatch	·	2.6 km	MPC · JPL
284868	2009 CO_{45}	—	February 14, 2009	Kitt Peak	Spacewatch	·	2.0 km	MPC · JPL
284869	2009 CG_{55}	—	February 14, 2009	Mount Lemmon	Mount Lemmon Survey	·	3.3 km	MPC · JPL
284870	2009 CT_{58}	—	February 4, 2009	Kitt Peak	Spacewatch	·	3.8 km	MPC · JPL
284871	2009 CK_{64}	—	February 3, 2009	Kitt Peak	Spacewatch	EOS	2.1 km	MPC · JPL
284872	2009 DV_{10}	—	February 16, 2009	Dauban	Kugel, F.	·	1.8 km	MPC · JPL
284873	2009 DN_{37}	—	February 23, 2009	Calar Alto	F. Hormuth	GEF	1.2 km	MPC · JPL
284874	2009 DX_{39}	—	February 20, 2009	Dauban	Kugel, F.	·	2.4 km	MPC · JPL
284875	2009 DG_{41}	—	February 18, 2009	La Sagra	OAM	·	5.1 km	MPC · JPL
284876	2009 DK_{42}	—	February 18, 2009	La Sagra	OAM	·	4.4 km	MPC · JPL
284877	2009 DA_{66}	—	February 24, 2009	Mount Lemmon	Mount Lemmon Survey	·	3.0 km	MPC · JPL
284878	2009 DX_{71}	—	December 6, 2008	Kitt Peak	Spacewatch	·	2.0 km	MPC · JPL
284879	2009 DF_{93}	—	February 28, 2009	Mount Lemmon	Mount Lemmon Survey	EOS	4.1 km	MPC · JPL
284880	2009 DR_{127}	—	February 20, 2009	Kitt Peak	Spacewatch	EOS	2.6 km	MPC · JPL
284881	2009 EA_{21}	—	March 15, 2009	La Sagra	OAM	·	3.6 km	MPC · JPL
284882	2009 FY_{59}	—	March 31, 2009	Mount Lemmon	Mount Lemmon Survey	L5	10 km	MPC · JPL
284883	2009 FB_{63}	—	March 26, 2009	Kitt Peak	Spacewatch	L5	10 km	MPC · JPL
284884	2009 HT_{15}	—	April 18, 2009	Kitt Peak	Spacewatch	·	3.6 km	MPC · JPL
284885	2009 HU_{50}	—	April 21, 2009	Kitt Peak	Spacewatch	·	3.1 km	MPC · JPL
284886	2009 JO_{4}	—	May 13, 2009	Kitt Peak	Spacewatch	·	3.9 km	MPC · JPL
284887	2009 KE_{9}	—	May 24, 2009	Catalina	CSS	L5	20 km	MPC · JPL
284888	2009 QR_{14}	—	August 16, 2009	Kitt Peak	Spacewatch	·	1.5 km	MPC · JPL
284889	2009 QJ_{46}	—	August 27, 2009	Kitt Peak	Spacewatch	MAS	820 m	MPC · JPL
284890	2009 QL_{60}	—	August 17, 2009	Kitt Peak	Spacewatch	·	3.6 km	MPC · JPL
284891 Kona	2009 RT_{26}	Kona	September 13, 2009	ESA OGS	ESA OGS	TIR	3.6 km	MPC · JPL
284892	2009 SN_{84}	—	September 18, 2009	Mount Lemmon	Mount Lemmon Survey	MAS	870 m	MPC · JPL
284893	2009 SQ_{129}	—	September 18, 2009	Kitt Peak	Spacewatch	·	1.8 km	MPC · JPL
284894	2009 SV_{154}	—	September 20, 2009	Catalina	CSS	·	2.2 km	MPC · JPL
284895	2009 SW_{168}	—	September 23, 2009	Uccle	T. Pauwels	·	5.1 km	MPC · JPL
284896	2009 SY_{337}	—	September 28, 2009	Catalina	CSS	·	3.8 km	MPC · JPL
284897	2009 SQ_{340}	—	September 20, 2009	Kitt Peak	Spacewatch	·	1.1 km	MPC · JPL
284898	2009 TC_{5}	—	October 10, 2009	La Sagra	OAM	·	1.5 km	MPC · JPL
284899	2009 UV_{20}	—	October 21, 2009	Bisei SG Center	BATTeRS	·	2.7 km	MPC · JPL
284900	2009 US_{80}	—	October 22, 2009	Catalina	CSS	·	2.6 km	MPC · JPL

== 284901–285000 ==
back to top

Designation			Discovery			Properties		Ref
Permanent	Provisional	Named after	Date	Site	Discoverer(s)	Category	Diam.	Ref
284901	2009 UD_{147}	—	October 18, 2009	Mount Lemmon	Mount Lemmon Survey	·	2.3 km	MPC · JPL
284902	2009 VL_{14}	—	November 8, 2009	Mount Lemmon	Mount Lemmon Survey	·	3.5 km	MPC · JPL
284903	2009 VF_{43}	—	November 9, 2009	Mount Lemmon	Mount Lemmon Survey	·	2.7 km	MPC · JPL
284904	2009 VK_{68}	—	November 9, 2009	Kitt Peak	Spacewatch	EOS	3.2 km	MPC · JPL
284905	2009 VZ_{93}	—	November 12, 2009	La Sagra	OAM	·	4.9 km	MPC · JPL
284906	2009 XR_{6}	—	December 10, 2009	Mount Lemmon	Mount Lemmon Survey	H	850 m	MPC · JPL
284907	2009 XH_{16}	—	December 15, 2009	Mount Lemmon	Mount Lemmon Survey	·	1.2 km	MPC · JPL
284908	2009 YA_{17}	—	December 19, 2009	Mount Lemmon	Mount Lemmon Survey	·	2.4 km	MPC · JPL
284909	2009 YR_{25}	—	December 26, 2009	Kitt Peak	Spacewatch	·	780 m	MPC · JPL
284910	2010 AU_{11}	—	January 6, 2010	Kitt Peak	Spacewatch	·	1.4 km	MPC · JPL
284911	2010 AW_{32}	—	January 7, 2010	Kitt Peak	Spacewatch	·	1.2 km	MPC · JPL
284912	2010 AS_{66}	—	January 11, 2010	Kitt Peak	Spacewatch	·	1.3 km	MPC · JPL
284913	2010 AJ_{76}	—	January 13, 2010	Socorro	LINEAR	·	2.0 km	MPC · JPL
284914	2010 AP_{79}	—	January 8, 2010	Kitt Peak	Spacewatch	H	780 m	MPC · JPL
284915	2010 AX_{91}	—	January 8, 2010	WISE	WISE	·	3.4 km	MPC · JPL
284916	2010 AC_{125}	—	March 19, 2001	Apache Point	SDSS	VER	4.8 km	MPC · JPL
284917	2010 BG_{4}	—	January 23, 2010	Bisei SG Center	BATTeRS	JUN	1.4 km	MPC · JPL
284918	2010 BO_{15}	—	January 16, 2010	WISE	WISE	·	3.2 km	MPC · JPL
284919 Kaçar	2010 BK_{82}	Kaçar	January 25, 2010	WISE	WISE	·	5.5 km	MPC · JPL
284920	2010 CM_{46}	—	February 12, 2010	WISE	WISE	·	4.4 km	MPC · JPL
284921	2010 CU_{56}	—	February 13, 2010	Socorro	LINEAR	·	990 m	MPC · JPL
284922	2010 CL_{82}	—	February 13, 2010	Kitt Peak	Spacewatch	·	2.1 km	MPC · JPL
284923	2010 CT_{82}	—	February 13, 2010	Kitt Peak	Spacewatch	·	1.7 km	MPC · JPL
284924	2010 CW_{96}	—	February 14, 2010	Mount Lemmon	Mount Lemmon Survey	·	1.3 km	MPC · JPL
284925	2010 CY_{103}	—	February 14, 2010	Kitt Peak	Spacewatch	·	2.4 km	MPC · JPL
284926	2010 CX_{128}	—	February 9, 2010	Catalina	CSS	·	5.6 km	MPC · JPL
284927	2010 CU_{153}	—	February 14, 2010	Catalina	CSS	·	1.9 km	MPC · JPL
284928	2010 CH_{172}	—	February 15, 2010	Kitt Peak	Spacewatch	·	1.9 km	MPC · JPL
284929	2010 CA_{180}	—	February 7, 2010	La Sagra	OAM	·	1.3 km	MPC · JPL
284930	2010 CC_{225}	—	February 8, 2010	WISE	WISE	·	5.6 km	MPC · JPL
284931	2010 DR	—	February 16, 2010	Mayhill	Lowe, A.	·	2.9 km	MPC · JPL
284932	2010 DG_{3}	—	February 16, 2010	Catalina	CSS	·	1.8 km	MPC · JPL
284933	2010 DX_{7}	—	February 16, 2010	Kitt Peak	Spacewatch	·	1.2 km	MPC · JPL
284934	2010 DN_{26}	—	January 17, 2008	Mount Lemmon	Mount Lemmon Survey	T_{j} (2.98) · EUP	5.4 km	MPC · JPL
284935	2010 DS_{50}	—	February 21, 2010	WISE	WISE	·	4.1 km	MPC · JPL
284936	2010 DU_{50}	—	February 21, 2010	WISE	WISE	(45637) · CYB	4.7 km	MPC · JPL
284937	2010 DY_{53}	—	February 23, 2010	WISE	WISE	CYB	6.5 km	MPC · JPL
284938	2010 DX_{73}	—	February 24, 2010	Kitt Peak	Spacewatch	·	1.8 km	MPC · JPL
284939	2010 DL_{75}	—	February 17, 2010	Kitt Peak	Spacewatch	·	1.2 km	MPC · JPL
284940	2010 EM_{2}	—	March 3, 2010	Nazaret	Muler, G.	V	760 m	MPC · JPL
284941	2010 EB_{21}	—	March 9, 2010	Taunus	E. Schwab, R. Kling	·	1.6 km	MPC · JPL
284942	2010 EQ_{30}	—	March 10, 2010	Moletai	K. Černis, Zdanavicius, J.	·	1.7 km	MPC · JPL
284943	2010 EZ_{33}	—	March 5, 2010	Kitt Peak	Spacewatch	·	1.4 km	MPC · JPL
284944	2010 EQ_{34}	—	March 9, 2010	La Sagra	OAM	·	2.3 km	MPC · JPL
284945 Saint-Imier	2010 EM_{44}	Saint-Imier	March 14, 2010	Vicques	M. Ory	·	2.9 km	MPC · JPL
284946	2010 EC_{79}	—	March 12, 2010	Mount Lemmon	Mount Lemmon Survey	·	2.4 km	MPC · JPL
284947	2010 EO_{87}	—	March 13, 2010	Mount Lemmon	Mount Lemmon Survey	·	1.4 km	MPC · JPL
284948	2010 ET_{99}	—	March 14, 2010	Kitt Peak	Spacewatch	·	1.7 km	MPC · JPL
284949	2010 EK_{105}	—	March 12, 2010	Catalina	CSS	·	1.5 km	MPC · JPL
284950	2010 EO_{126}	—	October 11, 2007	Catalina	CSS	·	3.4 km	MPC · JPL
284951	2010 EW_{126}	—	March 15, 2010	Catalina	CSS	RAF	1.5 km	MPC · JPL
284952	2010 EG_{127}	—	March 15, 2010	Mount Lemmon	Mount Lemmon Survey	·	3.9 km	MPC · JPL
284953	2010 EL_{127}	—	May 2, 2006	Catalina	CSS	·	2.0 km	MPC · JPL
284954	2010 EF_{129}	—	March 12, 2010	Kitt Peak	Spacewatch	·	2.0 km	MPC · JPL
284955	2010 EN_{129}	—	March 12, 2010	Mount Lemmon	Mount Lemmon Survey	·	2.2 km	MPC · JPL
284956	2010 EF_{130}	—	March 13, 2010	Kitt Peak	Spacewatch	·	3.7 km	MPC · JPL
284957	2010 EJ_{133}	—	March 14, 2010	Kitt Peak	Spacewatch	·	1.5 km	MPC · JPL
284958	2010 EH_{137}	—	March 15, 2010	Mount Lemmon	Mount Lemmon Survey	·	1.8 km	MPC · JPL
284959	2010 EP_{139}	—	March 13, 2010	Catalina	CSS	·	3.1 km	MPC · JPL
284960	2010 EC_{140}	—	March 15, 2010	Mount Lemmon	Mount Lemmon Survey	·	2.9 km	MPC · JPL
284961	2010 ET_{140}	—	March 15, 2010	Catalina	CSS	·	2.0 km	MPC · JPL
284962	2010 FW	—	March 16, 2010	Kitt Peak	Spacewatch	·	2.1 km	MPC · JPL
284963	2010 FC_{5}	—	March 16, 2010	Mount Lemmon	Mount Lemmon Survey	·	2.9 km	MPC · JPL
284964	2010 FO_{5}	—	March 17, 2010	Mount Lemmon	Mount Lemmon Survey	·	2.4 km	MPC · JPL
284965	2010 FX_{14}	—	March 17, 2010	Catalina	CSS	·	3.9 km	MPC · JPL
284966	2010 FO_{20}	—	March 18, 2010	Mount Lemmon	Mount Lemmon Survey	·	1.9 km	MPC · JPL
284967	2010 FY_{22}	—	March 18, 2010	Mount Lemmon	Mount Lemmon Survey	·	3.6 km	MPC · JPL
284968	2010 FZ_{27}	—	March 20, 2010	Catalina	CSS	·	3.2 km	MPC · JPL
284969	2010 FG_{85}	—	March 19, 2010	Purple Mountain	PMO NEO Survey Program	·	2.4 km	MPC · JPL
284970	2010 FP_{100}	—	August 6, 2002	Palomar	NEAT	NEM	2.7 km	MPC · JPL
284971	2010 GS_{6}	—	April 3, 2010	Purple Mountain	PMO NEO Survey Program	·	3.0 km	MPC · JPL
284972	2010 GM_{7}	—	April 3, 2010	Kitt Peak	Spacewatch	·	2.3 km	MPC · JPL
284973	2010 GJ_{25}	—	April 5, 2010	Kitt Peak	Spacewatch	·	3.1 km	MPC · JPL
284974	2010 GV_{26}	—	April 5, 2010	Kitt Peak	Spacewatch	·	3.5 km	MPC · JPL
284975	2010 GG_{27}	—	April 5, 2010	Kitt Peak	Spacewatch	·	3.8 km	MPC · JPL
284976	2010 GA_{32}	—	April 6, 2010	Catalina	CSS	·	4.7 km	MPC · JPL
284977	2010 GV_{96}	—	April 14, 2010	Sierra Stars	Stars, Sierra	BRA	1.9 km	MPC · JPL
284978	2010 GG_{104}	—	April 7, 2010	Kitt Peak	Spacewatch	·	3.0 km	MPC · JPL
284979	2010 GO_{105}	—	April 7, 2010	Kitt Peak	Spacewatch	HYG	3.5 km	MPC · JPL
284980	2010 GC_{118}	—	April 10, 2010	Mount Lemmon	Mount Lemmon Survey	·	3.2 km	MPC · JPL
284981	2010 GT_{119}	—	April 11, 2010	Mount Lemmon	Mount Lemmon Survey	·	3.8 km	MPC · JPL
284982	2010 GS_{124}	—	April 6, 2010	Kitt Peak	Spacewatch	·	3.6 km	MPC · JPL
284983	2010 GG_{127}	—	April 10, 2010	Kitt Peak	Spacewatch	·	4.4 km	MPC · JPL
284984 Ikaunieks	2010 GC_{158}	Ikaunieks	April 12, 2010	Baldone	K. Černis, I. Eglītis	·	1.8 km	MPC · JPL
284985	2010 GO_{158}	—	April 14, 2010	Mount Lemmon	Mount Lemmon Survey	·	4.4 km	MPC · JPL
284986	2010 HT_{23}	—	April 25, 2010	Mount Lemmon	Mount Lemmon Survey	·	6.0 km	MPC · JPL
284987	2010 HH_{105}	—	September 20, 2001	Socorro	LINEAR	·	2.7 km	MPC · JPL
284988	2010 JV_{35}	—	May 5, 2010	Mount Lemmon	Mount Lemmon Survey	HOF	3.3 km	MPC · JPL
284989	2010 JP_{38}	—	May 5, 2010	Nogales	Tenagra II	LIX	4.3 km	MPC · JPL
284990	2010 JF_{76}	—	May 5, 2010	Mount Lemmon	Mount Lemmon Survey	·	4.6 km	MPC · JPL
284991	2010 JU_{111}	—	May 12, 2010	Mount Lemmon	Mount Lemmon Survey	·	4.4 km	MPC · JPL
284992	2010 JA_{148}	—	May 12, 2010	Kitt Peak	Spacewatch	·	3.4 km	MPC · JPL
284993	2010 JD_{171}	—	May 5, 2010	Mount Lemmon	Mount Lemmon Survey	HOF	2.9 km	MPC · JPL
284994	2010 KD_{60}	—	May 20, 2010	Haleakala	M. Micheli	PHO	1.3 km	MPC · JPL
284995	2010 KF_{124}	—	May 31, 2010	WISE	WISE	·	2.6 km	MPC · JPL
284996 Rosaparks	2010 LD_{58}	Rosaparks	June 9, 2010	WISE	WISE	·	3.5 km	MPC · JPL
284997	2010 NV_{7}	—	July 4, 2010	WISE	WISE	·	3.2 km	MPC · JPL
284998	2010 NU_{29}	—	July 7, 2010	WISE	WISE	·	4.7 km	MPC · JPL
284999	2010 NN_{90}	—	July 2, 2010	WISE	WISE	·	4.5 km	MPC · JPL
285000	2010 OS_{56}	—	July 23, 2010	WISE	WISE	·	3.9 km	MPC · JPL

back to top

== See also ==
- Meanings of minor-planet names: 284001–285000
