= Meanings of minor-planet names: 284001–285000 =

As minor planet discoveries are confirmed, they are given a permanent number by the IAU's Minor Planet Center (MPC), and the discoverers can then submit names for them, following the IAU's naming conventions. The list below concerns those minor planets in the specified number-range that have received names, and explains the meanings of those names.

Official naming citations of newly named small Solar System bodies are approved and published in a bulletin by IAU's Working Group for Small Bodies Nomenclature (WGSBN). Before May 2021, citations were published in MPC's Minor Planet Circulars for many decades. Recent citations can also be found on the JPL Small-Body Database (SBDB). Until his death in 2016, German astronomer Lutz D. Schmadel compiled these citations into the Dictionary of Minor Planet Names (DMP) and regularly updated the collection.

Based on Paul Herget's The Names of the Minor Planets, Schmadel also researched the unclear origin of numerous asteroids, most of which had been named prior to World War II. This article incorporates text from this source, which is in the public domain: SBDB New namings may only be added to this list below after official publication as the preannouncement of names is condemned. The WGSBN publishes a comprehensive guideline for the naming rules of non-cometary small Solar System bodies.

== 284001–284100 ==
| Named minor planet | Provisional | This minor planet was named for... | Ref · Catalog |
|---|---|---|---|
| 284029 Esplugafrancolí | 2004 XQ_{16} | The Catalan village of L'Espluga de Francolí, located in the Tarragona province of Spain, known for its extensive cave system | JPL · 284029 |
| 284054 Keeling | 2005 CO_{2} | Charles David Keeling, American climatologist. | IAU · 284054 |

== 284101–284200 ==
back to top

| Named minor planet | Provisional | This minor planet was named for... | Ref · Catalog |
|---|---|---|---|
There are no named minor planets in this number range

== 284201–284300 ==
back to top

| Named minor planet | Provisional | This minor planet was named for... | Ref · Catalog |
|---|---|---|---|
There are no named minor planets in this number range

== 284301–284400 ==
back to top

| Named minor planet | Provisional | This minor planet was named for... | Ref · Catalog |
|---|---|---|---|
| 284357 Semseyandor | 2006 SA_{78} | Andor Semsey (1833–1923), a landowner, a naturalist and a patron of Hungarian science. | IAU · 284357 |

== 284401–284500 ==
back to top

| Named minor planet | Provisional | This minor planet was named for... | Ref · Catalog |
|---|---|---|---|
There are no named minor planets in this number range

== 284501–284600 ==
back to top

| Named minor planet | Provisional | This minor planet was named for... | Ref · Catalog |
|---|---|---|---|
There are no named minor planets in this number range

== 284601–284700 ==
back to top

| Named minor planet | Provisional | This minor planet was named for... | Ref · Catalog |
|---|---|---|---|
There are no named minor planets in this number range

== 284701–284800 ==
back to top

| Named minor planet | Provisional | This minor planet was named for... | Ref · Catalog |
|---|---|---|---|
There are no named minor planets in this number range

== 284801–284900 ==
back to top

| Named minor planet | Provisional | This minor planet was named for... | Ref · Catalog |
|---|---|---|---|
| 284891 Kona | 2009 RT_{26} | Kona, a district of the Big Island of Hawaii, United States, known for its Kona coffee and for its annually held Ironman World Championship Triathlon | JPL · 284891 |

== 284901–285000 ==
back to top

| Named minor planet | Provisional | This minor planet was named for... | Ref · Catalog |
|---|---|---|---|
| 284919 Kaçar | 2010 BK_{82} | Betül Kaçar (born 1983), a Turkish-American astrobiologist and expert on biosignatures and abiogenesis on Earth. She works with the UN Women for the empowerment of women. | IAU · 284919 |
| 284945 Saint-Imier | 2010 EM_{44} | Saint-Imier, a Swiss town founded by the hermit St. Imerius in 884 AD | JPL · 284945 |
| 284984 Ikaunieks | 2010 GC_{158} | Jānis Ikaunieks (1912–1969), a Latvian astronomer and observer of red giants who founded the Latvian Astronomical Society and the popular science magazine The Starry Sky and was the first director of the Baldone Observatory (069) | JPL · 284984 |
| 284996 Rosaparks | 2010 LD_{58} | Rosa Parks (1913–2005), a civil rights activist from Alabama, known as the mother of the freedom movement. In 1955, she refused to give up her seat to a white passenger on a bus. Her action spurred efforts throughout the United States to end segregation. | JPL · 284996 |

back to top

| Preceded by 283,001–284,000 | Meanings of minor-planet names List of minor planets: 284,001–285,000 | Succeeded by 285,001–286,000 |
