= 284996 Rosaparks =

Asteroid

Discovery
- Discovered by: WISE
- Discovery site: Earth orbit
- Discovery date: 9 June 2010

Designations
- Pronunciation: /ˌroʊzəˈpɑːrks/
- Named after: Rosa Parks (civil rights activist)
- Alternative designations: 2010 LD_{58}
- Minor planet category: main-belt · (outer) background

Orbital characteristics
- Epoch 27 April 2019 (JD 2458600.5)
- Uncertainty parameter 0
- Observation arc: 13.70 yr (5,003 d)
- Aphelion: 3.5469 AU
- Perihelion: 2.7347 AU
- Semi-major axis: 3.1408 AU
- Eccentricity: 0.1293
- Orbital period (sidereal): 5.57 yr (2,033 d)
- Mean anomaly: 177.93°
- Mean motion: 0° 10^{m} 37.56^{s} / day
- Inclination: 12.115°
- Longitude of ascending node: 271.49°
- Argument of perihelion: 331.82°

Physical characteristics
- Mean diameter: 3.512±0.951 km
- Geometric albedo: 0.099±0.052
- Absolute magnitude (H): 15.5

284996 Rosaparks, provisional designation 2010 LD_{58}, is a dark background asteroid from the outer regions of the asteroid belt, approximately 3.5 kilometers (2.2 miles) in diameter. It was discovered on 9 June 2010 by scientists working with data from the Wide-field Infrared Survey Explorer spacecraft. It is named after Rosa Parks, the African-American civil rights activist.

== Orbit and classification ==
Rosaparks is a non-family asteroid from the main-belt's background population. It orbits the Sun in the outer asteroid belt at a distance of 2.7–3.5 AU once every 5 years and 7 months (2,033 days). Its orbit has a semi-major axis of 3.14 AU), an eccentricity of 0.13 and an inclination of 12° with respect to the ecliptic.

The body's observation arc begins with a precovery taken by the Near-Earth Asteroid Tracking program in February 2004, more than six years prior to its official discovery observation by the Wide-field Infrared Survey Explorer (WISE).

== Naming ==
This minor planet was named after Rosa Parks (1913–2005), the African-American civil rights activist. The official naming citation was published by the Minor Planet Center on 9 September 2014 (M.P.C. 89835).

== Physical characteristics ==
Like most asteroids from the outer main-belt, Rosaparks has a low albedo (see below), indicating a carbonaceous composition. The body's spectral type has not been determined. According to the survey carried out by the NEOWISE mission of NASA's WISE telescope, Rosaparks measures 3.512 kilometers in diameter and its surface has an albedo of 0.099. As of 2018, no rotational lightcurve has been obtained from photometric observations. The body's rotation period, pole and shape remain unknown.

== In popular media ==
During the UK's Black History Month in 2018, the asteroid featured in the television series Doctor Who. In the final scene of the episode "Rosa", after witnessing Rosa Parks's arrest for refusing to give up her seat on a Montgomery, Alabama passenger bus, the Thirteenth Doctor takes the TARDIS to the asteroid belt and shows her companions the object that has been named in Parks's honour.
