= Meanings of minor-planet names: 246001–247000 =

As minor planet discoveries are confirmed, they are given a permanent number by the IAU's Minor Planet Center (MPC), and the discoverers can then submit names for them, following the IAU's naming conventions. The list below concerns those minor planets in the specified number-range that have received names, and explains the meanings of those names.

Official naming citations of newly named small Solar System bodies are approved and published in a bulletin by IAU's Working Group for Small Bodies Nomenclature (WGSBN). Before May 2021, citations were published in MPC's Minor Planet Circulars for many decades. Recent citations can also be found on the JPL Small-Body Database (SBDB). Until his death in 2016, German astronomer Lutz D. Schmadel compiled these citations into the Dictionary of Minor Planet Names (DMP) and regularly updated the collection.

Based on Paul Herget's The Names of the Minor Planets, Schmadel also researched the unclear origin of numerous asteroids, most of which had been named prior to World War II. This article incorporates text from this source, which is in the public domain: SBDB New namings may only be added to this list below after official publication as the preannouncement of names is condemned. The WGSBN publishes a comprehensive guideline for the naming rules of non-cometary small Solar System bodies.

== 246001–246100 ==
Named minor planet	Provisional	This minor planet was named for...	Ref · Catalog
There are no named minor planets in this number range

== 246101–246200 ==
back to top

Named minor planet	Provisional	This minor planet was named for...	Ref · Catalog
246132 Lugyny	2007 NM_{1}	Lugyny, a district in northern Ukraine, 110 km from Chernobyl and location of the Lugyny Youth Centre	JPL · 246132
246153 Waltermaria	2007 PW_{30}	Walter E. B. Mazzucato (1921–2003) and Maria L. Pozzi (1927–2003), parents of Italian co-discoverer Michele Mazzucato	JPL · 246153
246164 Zdvyzhensk	2007 QH_{3}	Brusyliv (Zdvyzhensk), the ancient town in Ukraine and birthplace of Ilarion Ohienko	JPL · 246164
246167 Joskohn	2007 RF_{8}	Jos Kohn (born 1988) studied physics at the university of Fribourg, Switzerland. He promotes astronomy to more than 600 adults and children throughout the country per year and is also a member of the observatory of Ependes, where he performs astronomy experiments with students.	JPL · 246167
246171 Konrad	2007 RU_{15}	Konrad König (born 2005), the first-born son of Agathe Schmid-König and astronomer Michael König, who discovered this minor planet	JPL · 246171

== 246201–246300 ==
back to top

Named minor planet	Provisional	This minor planet was named for...	Ref · Catalog
246238 Crampton	2007 RL_{274}	David Crampton (born 1942) has overseen the development of exceptionally efficient, multiplexed spectrographs for CFHT and Gemini. Using them he helped establish Canadian excellence in observational cosmology. He has also excelled in research on Galactic structure and multiple stars, including X-ray binaries.	JPL · 246238
246247 Sheldoncooper	2007 SP_{14}	Sheldon Cooper, a fictional character in the television series The Big Bang Theory, portrayed by actor Jim Parsons (born 1973)	JPL · 246247

== 246301–246400 ==
back to top

Named minor planet	Provisional	This minor planet was named for...	Ref · Catalog
246333 Williamdane	2007 TK_{238}	William Dane, was part of a small team of students in Massachusetts, USA, that worked on developing successful best practices for hunting NEOs.	IAU · 246333
246345 Carolharris	2007 TH_{298}	Carol E. Harris (born 1940), Professor Emeritus at the University of Victoria.	JPL · 246345

== 246401–246500 ==
back to top

Named minor planet	Provisional	This minor planet was named for...	Ref · Catalog
There are no named minor planets in this number range

== 246501–246600 ==
back to top

Named minor planet	Provisional	This minor planet was named for...	Ref · Catalog
246504 Hualien	2008 BG_{16}	Hualien County is the largest county in Taiwan in terms of area, and is located on the mountainous eastern coast of Taiwan.	JPL · 246504

== 246601–246700 ==
back to top

Named minor planet	Provisional	This minor planet was named for...	Ref · Catalog
246643 Miaoli	2008 YU_{9}	Miaoli, a city located in the mountainous terrain on the western coastline of Taiwan.	JPL · 246643

== 246701–246800 ==
back to top

Named minor planet	Provisional	This minor planet was named for...	Ref · Catalog
246759 Elviracheca	2009 CL_{4}	Elvira Checa Peña (born 1958), a chef at the Spanish Calar Alto Observatory during 2008–2014	JPL · 246759
246789 Pattinson	2009 DM_{89}	Robert Douglas Thomas Pattinson (born 1986), an English actor and musician.	JPL · 246789

== 246801–246900 ==
back to top

Named minor planet	Provisional	This minor planet was named for...	Ref · Catalog
246803 Martinezpatrick	2009 FB_{1}	Patrick Martinez (b. 1956), a French aeronautical engineer and amateur astronomer.	IAU · 246803
246821 Satyarthi	2009 QW_{33}	Kailash Satyarthi (born 1954), an Indian electrical engineer who received the 2014 Nobel Peace Prize for his advocacy of children's rights and education and for his fight against child labor.	JPL · 246821
246837 Bethfabinsky	2010 CR_{51}	Beth Fabinsky (born 1971), an American engineer who specializes in mission operations for NASA spacecraft.	JPL · 246837
246841 Williamirace	2010 DR_{58}	William Irace (born 1941) is an engineer who worked on the Viking Mars orbiters, the InfraRed Astronomical Satellite, the W. M. Keck Ten MeterTelescopes and the Spitzer Space Telescope.	JPL · 246841
246842 Dutchstapelbroek	2010 EZ_{5}	Maryn "Dutch" Stapelbroek (born 1947), a physicist specializing in infrared and visible light-detector design and construction.	JPL · 246842
246861 Johnelwell	2010 KC_{18}	John Elwell (born 1958), an expert in the design, construction and calibration of infrared instrumentation for space-based missions to study astrophysics and the Earth's atmosphere.	JPL · 246861

== 246901–247000 ==
back to top

Named minor planet	Provisional	This minor planet was named for...	Ref · Catalog
246913 Slocum	1998 SU_{63}	Joshua Slocum (1844 – c. 1909) was the first person to circumnavigate the world alone.	JPL · 246913

back to top

Preceded by 245,001–246,000	Meanings of minor-planet names List of minor planets: 246,001–247,000	Succeeded by 247,001–248,000
