= List of minor planets: 246001–247000 =

The following is a partial list of minor planets, running from minor-planet number 246001 through 247000, inclusive. The primary data for this and other partial lists is based on JPL's "Small-Body Orbital Elements" and data available from the Minor Planet Center. Critical list information is also provided by the MPC, unless otherwise specified from Lowell Observatory. A detailed description of the table's columns and additional sources are given on the main page including a complete list of every page in this series, and a statistical break-up on the dynamical classification of minor planets.

Also see the summary list of all named bodies in numerical and alphabetical order, and the corresponding naming citations for the number range of this particular list. New namings may only be added to this list after official publication, as the preannouncement of names is condemned by the Working Group for Small Bodies Nomenclature of the International Astronomical Union.

Near-Earth obj.	MBA (inner)	MBA (outer)	Centaur
Mars-crosser	MBA (middle)	Jupiter trojan	Trans-Neptunian obj.
Unclassified

== 246001–246100 ==
Designation			Discovery			Properties		Ref
Permanent	Provisional	Named after	Date	Site	Discoverer(s)	Category	Diam.	Ref
246001	2006 SM_{349}	—	September 29, 2006	Kitt Peak	Spacewatch	·	3.7 km	MPC · JPL
246002	2006 SV_{361}	—	September 30, 2006	Mount Lemmon	Mount Lemmon Survey	·	3.3 km	MPC · JPL
246003	2006 SL_{367}	—	September 25, 2006	Catalina	CSS	·	3.2 km	MPC · JPL
246004	2006 TO_{12}	—	October 10, 2006	Palomar	NEAT	·	4.4 km	MPC · JPL
246005	2006 TS_{12}	—	October 10, 2006	Palomar	NEAT	·	1.5 km	MPC · JPL
246006	2006 TT_{13}	—	October 10, 2006	Palomar	NEAT	AGN	1.8 km	MPC · JPL
246007	2006 TO_{14}	—	October 11, 2006	Kitt Peak	Spacewatch	·	3.4 km	MPC · JPL
246008	2006 TL_{15}	—	October 11, 2006	Kitt Peak	Spacewatch	·	5.4 km	MPC · JPL
246009	2006 TF_{17}	—	October 11, 2006	Kitt Peak	Spacewatch	·	4.3 km	MPC · JPL
246010	2006 TD_{20}	—	October 11, 2006	Kitt Peak	Spacewatch	·	3.3 km	MPC · JPL
246011	2006 TO_{51}	—	October 12, 2006	Kitt Peak	Spacewatch	·	2.3 km	MPC · JPL
246012	2006 TU_{63}	—	October 10, 2006	Palomar	NEAT	·	4.0 km	MPC · JPL
246013	2006 TB_{67}	—	October 11, 2006	Palomar	NEAT	·	3.7 km	MPC · JPL
246014	2006 TN_{68}	—	October 11, 2006	Palomar	NEAT	AGN	1.5 km	MPC · JPL
246015	2006 TA_{71}	—	October 11, 2006	Palomar	NEAT	·	3.5 km	MPC · JPL
246016	2006 TT_{73}	—	October 11, 2006	Kitt Peak	Spacewatch	THM	3.0 km	MPC · JPL
246017	2006 TB_{78}	—	October 12, 2006	Palomar	NEAT	·	5.0 km	MPC · JPL
246018	2006 TA_{79}	—	October 12, 2006	Kitt Peak	Spacewatch	CYB	4.1 km	MPC · JPL
246019	2006 TX_{92}	—	October 15, 2006	Kitt Peak	Spacewatch	CYB	6.8 km	MPC · JPL
246020	2006 TU_{109}	—	October 11, 2006	Palomar	NEAT	·	3.2 km	MPC · JPL
246021	2006 TS_{117}	—	October 3, 2006	Apache Point	A. C. Becker	(43176)	4.3 km	MPC · JPL
246022	2006 UN_{2}	—	October 16, 2006	Goodricke-Pigott	R. A. Tucker	·	2.8 km	MPC · JPL
246023	2006 UU_{13}	—	October 17, 2006	Mount Lemmon	Mount Lemmon Survey	·	3.8 km	MPC · JPL
246024	2006 UJ_{43}	—	October 16, 2006	Kitt Peak	Spacewatch	·	1.9 km	MPC · JPL
246025	2006 UE_{54}	—	October 17, 2006	Catalina	CSS	·	4.9 km	MPC · JPL
246026	2006 UF_{54}	—	October 17, 2006	Catalina	CSS	·	3.2 km	MPC · JPL
246027	2006 UF_{56}	—	October 18, 2006	Kitt Peak	Spacewatch	·	3.5 km	MPC · JPL
246028	2006 UJ_{67}	—	October 16, 2006	Catalina	CSS	·	1.5 km	MPC · JPL
246029	2006 UB_{71}	—	October 16, 2006	Catalina	CSS	·	2.9 km	MPC · JPL
246030	2006 UB_{75}	—	October 17, 2006	Catalina	CSS	·	1.4 km	MPC · JPL
246031	2006 UW_{76}	—	October 17, 2006	Kitt Peak	Spacewatch	·	3.5 km	MPC · JPL
246032	2006 UT_{89}	—	October 17, 2006	Kitt Peak	Spacewatch	·	3.1 km	MPC · JPL
246033	2006 UV_{89}	—	October 17, 2006	Kitt Peak	Spacewatch	(5)	2.5 km	MPC · JPL
246034	2006 UT_{95}	—	October 18, 2006	Kitt Peak	Spacewatch	(31811)	3.0 km	MPC · JPL
246035	2006 UA_{115}	—	October 19, 2006	Kitt Peak	Spacewatch	THM	3.0 km	MPC · JPL
246036	2006 UL_{137}	—	October 19, 2006	Catalina	CSS	EUN	2.4 km	MPC · JPL
246037	2006 UB_{150}	—	October 20, 2006	Catalina	CSS	·	5.5 km	MPC · JPL
246038	2006 UD_{150}	—	October 20, 2006	Catalina	CSS	TIR	6.3 km	MPC · JPL
246039	2006 US_{175}	—	October 16, 2006	Catalina	CSS	BRA	3.3 km	MPC · JPL
246040	2006 UN_{176}	—	October 16, 2006	Catalina	CSS	·	4.3 km	MPC · JPL
246041	2006 UF_{187}	—	October 19, 2006	Catalina	CSS	MAR	2.3 km	MPC · JPL
246042	2006 UD_{189}	—	October 19, 2006	Catalina	CSS	T_{j} (2.99)	4.5 km	MPC · JPL
246043	2006 UO_{190}	—	October 19, 2006	Catalina	CSS	·	2.8 km	MPC · JPL
246044	2006 UG_{193}	—	October 20, 2006	Mount Lemmon	Mount Lemmon Survey	VER	4.8 km	MPC · JPL
246045	2006 UU_{198}	—	October 20, 2006	Mount Lemmon	Mount Lemmon Survey	(5)	3.7 km	MPC · JPL
246046	2006 US_{209}	—	October 23, 2006	Kitt Peak	Spacewatch	·	3.6 km	MPC · JPL
246047	2006 UC_{221}	—	October 17, 2006	Kitt Peak	Spacewatch	URS	6.5 km	MPC · JPL
246048	2006 UT_{230}	—	October 21, 2006	Palomar	NEAT	·	3.3 km	MPC · JPL
246049	2006 UR_{231}	—	October 21, 2006	Palomar	NEAT	·	4.1 km	MPC · JPL
246050	2006 UM_{236}	—	October 23, 2006	Kitt Peak	Spacewatch	THM	3.2 km	MPC · JPL
246051	2006 UN_{237}	—	October 23, 2006	Kitt Peak	Spacewatch	·	3.2 km	MPC · JPL
246052	2006 UB_{253}	—	October 27, 2006	Mount Lemmon	Mount Lemmon Survey	SYL · CYB	6.9 km	MPC · JPL
246053	2006 UA_{338}	—	October 22, 2006	Mount Lemmon	Mount Lemmon Survey	EOS	3.1 km	MPC · JPL
246054	2006 UX_{338}	—	October 28, 2006	Kitt Peak	Spacewatch	·	4.5 km	MPC · JPL
246055	2006 VP_{6}	—	November 10, 2006	Kitt Peak	Spacewatch	·	3.2 km	MPC · JPL
246056	2006 VM_{9}	—	November 11, 2006	Catalina	CSS	·	3.4 km	MPC · JPL
246057	2006 VH_{25}	—	November 10, 2006	Kitt Peak	Spacewatch	·	2.4 km	MPC · JPL
246058	2006 VT_{31}	—	November 11, 2006	Kitt Peak	Spacewatch	·	2.3 km	MPC · JPL
246059	2006 VL_{48}	—	November 10, 2006	Socorro	LINEAR	·	1.8 km	MPC · JPL
246060	2006 VY_{51}	—	November 11, 2006	Kitt Peak	Spacewatch	AEO	1.3 km	MPC · JPL
246061	2006 VX_{52}	—	November 11, 2006	Kitt Peak	Spacewatch	·	2.4 km	MPC · JPL
246062	2006 VV_{65}	—	November 11, 2006	Kitt Peak	Spacewatch	DOR	3.9 km	MPC · JPL
246063	2006 VS_{73}	—	November 11, 2006	Mount Lemmon	Mount Lemmon Survey	·	3.4 km	MPC · JPL
246064	2006 VL_{94}	—	November 15, 2006	Catalina	CSS	·	4.1 km	MPC · JPL
246065	2006 VB_{99}	—	November 11, 2006	Mount Lemmon	Mount Lemmon Survey	·	4.0 km	MPC · JPL
246066	2006 VK_{120}	—	November 14, 2006	Mount Lemmon	Mount Lemmon Survey	·	2.5 km	MPC · JPL
246067	2006 VE_{129}	—	November 15, 2006	Socorro	LINEAR	·	5.0 km	MPC · JPL
246068	2006 VM_{149}	—	November 2, 2006	Catalina	CSS	·	2.6 km	MPC · JPL
246069	2006 VZ_{168}	—	November 14, 2006	Kitt Peak	Spacewatch	·	4.3 km	MPC · JPL
246070	2006 WD_{42}	—	November 16, 2006	Mount Lemmon	Mount Lemmon Survey	·	3.2 km	MPC · JPL
246071	2006 WH_{44}	—	November 16, 2006	Kitt Peak	Spacewatch	·	4.2 km	MPC · JPL
246072	2006 WJ_{57}	—	November 17, 2006	Kitt Peak	Spacewatch	·	4.1 km	MPC · JPL
246073	2006 WC_{62}	—	November 17, 2006	Catalina	CSS	·	4.8 km	MPC · JPL
246074	2006 WA_{107}	—	November 19, 2006	Catalina	CSS	·	3.7 km	MPC · JPL
246075	2006 WK_{120}	—	November 21, 2006	Socorro	LINEAR	·	4.0 km	MPC · JPL
246076	2006 WB_{150}	—	November 20, 2006	Kitt Peak	Spacewatch	·	3.0 km	MPC · JPL
246077	2006 WO_{198}	—	November 16, 2006	Kitt Peak	Spacewatch	·	1.2 km	MPC · JPL
246078	2006 WS_{198}	—	November 20, 2006	Catalina	CSS	MAR	3.0 km	MPC · JPL
246079	2006 XD_{4}	—	December 14, 2006	Kitami	K. Endate	ADE	4.5 km	MPC · JPL
246080	2006 XC_{5}	—	December 1, 2006	Catalina	CSS	·	1.7 km	MPC · JPL
246081	2006 XN_{5}	—	December 6, 2006	Palomar	NEAT	EUN	2.0 km	MPC · JPL
246082	2006 XT_{16}	—	December 10, 2006	Kitt Peak	Spacewatch	EOS	3.4 km	MPC · JPL
246083	2006 XQ_{17}	—	December 10, 2006	Kitt Peak	Spacewatch	·	1.8 km	MPC · JPL
246084	2006 XX_{34}	—	December 11, 2006	Kitt Peak	Spacewatch	HOF	3.1 km	MPC · JPL
246085	2006 XM_{51}	—	December 14, 2006	Kitt Peak	Spacewatch	·	3.8 km	MPC · JPL
246086	2006 YQ_{33}	—	December 21, 2006	Kitt Peak	Spacewatch	·	5.4 km	MPC · JPL
246087	2007 AL_{3}	—	January 8, 2007	Kitt Peak	Spacewatch	·	5.3 km	MPC · JPL
246088	2007 AW_{8}	—	January 9, 2007	Marly	P. Kocher	·	4.3 km	MPC · JPL
246089	2007 AA_{12}	—	January 14, 2007	Črni Vrh	Matičič, S.	EUP	7.3 km	MPC · JPL
246090	2007 AN_{25}	—	January 15, 2007	Goodricke-Pigott	R. A. Tucker	·	6.2 km	MPC · JPL
246091	2007 AW_{25}	—	January 15, 2007	Anderson Mesa	LONEOS	EOS	4.2 km	MPC · JPL
246092	2007 BS_{1}	—	January 16, 2007	Catalina	CSS	·	6.6 km	MPC · JPL
246093	2007 BR_{39}	—	January 24, 2007	Mount Lemmon	Mount Lemmon Survey	·	4.6 km	MPC · JPL
246094	2007 CS_{44}	—	February 8, 2007	Palomar	NEAT	·	2.9 km	MPC · JPL
246095	2007 DQ_{102}	—	February 16, 2007	Mount Lemmon	Mount Lemmon Survey	H	710 m	MPC · JPL
246096	2007 EL_{25}	—	March 10, 2007	Mount Lemmon	Mount Lemmon Survey	·	3.1 km	MPC · JPL
246097	2007 EN_{63}	—	March 10, 2007	Kitt Peak	Spacewatch	·	2.5 km	MPC · JPL
246098	2007 EA_{82}	—	March 11, 2007	Mount Lemmon	Mount Lemmon Survey	·	4.5 km	MPC · JPL
246099	2007 EL_{96}	—	March 10, 2007	Mount Lemmon	Mount Lemmon Survey	·	730 m	MPC · JPL
246100	2007 EV_{136}	—	March 10, 2007	Palomar	NEAT	H	650 m	MPC · JPL

== 246101–246200 ==
back to top

Designation			Discovery			Properties		Ref
Permanent	Provisional	Named after	Date	Site	Discoverer(s)	Category	Diam.	Ref
246101	2007 ED_{145}	—	March 12, 2007	Mount Lemmon	Mount Lemmon Survey	·	750 m	MPC · JPL
246102	2007 EY_{156}	—	March 12, 2007	Kitt Peak	Spacewatch	·	860 m	MPC · JPL
246103	2007 ER_{160}	—	March 14, 2007	Mount Lemmon	Mount Lemmon Survey	·	3.9 km	MPC · JPL
246104	2007 EB_{163}	—	March 15, 2007	Mount Lemmon	Mount Lemmon Survey	·	5.2 km	MPC · JPL
246105	2007 EE_{173}	—	March 14, 2007	Kitt Peak	Spacewatch	·	610 m	MPC · JPL
246106	2007 EE_{188}	—	March 11, 2007	Mount Lemmon	Mount Lemmon Survey	H	750 m	MPC · JPL
246107	2007 FM_{24}	—	March 20, 2007	Anderson Mesa	LONEOS	H	810 m	MPC · JPL
246108	2007 FT_{27}	—	March 20, 2007	Mount Lemmon	Mount Lemmon Survey	L5	12 km	MPC · JPL
246109	2007 FE_{31}	—	March 20, 2007	Mount Lemmon	Mount Lemmon Survey	·	800 m	MPC · JPL
246110	2007 FP_{41}	—	March 26, 2007	Mount Lemmon	Mount Lemmon Survey	·	2.8 km	MPC · JPL
246111	2007 FC_{50}	—	March 20, 2007	Catalina	CSS	·	3.7 km	MPC · JPL
246112	2007 GJ_{54}	—	April 15, 2007	Kitt Peak	Spacewatch	·	3.2 km	MPC · JPL
246113	2007 GY_{69}	—	April 15, 2007	Mount Lemmon	Mount Lemmon Survey	L5	10 km	MPC · JPL
246114	2007 GR_{70}	—	April 15, 2007	Mount Lemmon	Mount Lemmon Survey	L5	12 km	MPC · JPL
246115	2007 HC_{7}	—	April 16, 2007	Socorro	LINEAR	·	960 m	MPC · JPL
246116	2007 HS_{44}	—	April 18, 2007	Mount Lemmon	Mount Lemmon Survey	·	4.0 km	MPC · JPL
246117	2007 HD_{50}	—	April 20, 2007	Kitt Peak	Spacewatch	·	1.5 km	MPC · JPL
246118	2007 HB_{88}	—	April 20, 2007	Tiki	Teamo, N.	·	3.4 km	MPC · JPL
246119	2007 JC_{1}	—	May 7, 2007	Kitt Peak	Spacewatch	·	870 m	MPC · JPL
246120	2007 JJ_{3}	—	May 6, 2007	Kitt Peak	Spacewatch	·	6.3 km	MPC · JPL
246121	2007 JD_{11}	—	May 7, 2007	Kitt Peak	Spacewatch	·	1.5 km	MPC · JPL
246122	2007 JV_{12}	—	May 7, 2007	Kitt Peak	Spacewatch	EOS	4.0 km	MPC · JPL
246123	2007 JF_{13}	—	May 7, 2007	Lulin	LUSS	·	890 m	MPC · JPL
246124	2007 JW_{22}	—	May 11, 2007	Lulin	LUSS	·	900 m	MPC · JPL
246125	2007 JO_{42}	—	May 11, 2007	Catalina	CSS	H	930 m	MPC · JPL
246126	2007 KY_{3}	—	May 21, 2007	Catalina	CSS	PHO	1.2 km	MPC · JPL
246127	2007 LF_{16}	—	June 10, 2007	Kitt Peak	Spacewatch	·	4.9 km	MPC · JPL
246128	2007 LY_{18}	—	June 9, 2007	Catalina	CSS	slow	6.9 km	MPC · JPL
246129	2007 LT_{25}	—	June 14, 2007	Kitt Peak	Spacewatch	·	4.8 km	MPC · JPL
246130	2007 LK_{29}	—	June 15, 2007	Kitt Peak	Spacewatch	·	1.6 km	MPC · JPL
246131	2007 LV_{33}	—	June 12, 2007	Catalina	CSS	EUP	6.8 km	MPC · JPL
246132 Lugyny	2007 NM_{1}	Lugyny	July 9, 2007	Andrushivka	Andrushivka	·	1.3 km	MPC · JPL
246133	2007 NS_{1}	—	July 12, 2007	La Sagra	OAM	·	3.9 km	MPC · JPL
246134	2007 NA_{4}	—	July 13, 2007	Tiki	Teamo, N.	·	860 m	MPC · JPL
246135	2007 NB_{6}	—	July 10, 2007	Siding Spring	SSS	MAR	1.8 km	MPC · JPL
246136	2007 NM_{6}	—	July 10, 2007	Siding Spring	SSS	·	1.8 km	MPC · JPL
246137	2007 OC	—	July 16, 2007	La Sagra	OAM	·	850 m	MPC · JPL
246138	2007 OG_{3}	—	July 19, 2007	Catalina	CSS	AMO +1km	590 m	MPC · JPL
246139	2007 OF_{8}	—	July 25, 2007	Lulin	LUSS	·	1.1 km	MPC · JPL
246140	2007 PM	—	August 5, 2007	Dauban	Chante-Perdrix	PHO	4.3 km	MPC · JPL
246141	2007 PV	—	August 4, 2007	Reedy Creek	J. Broughton	·	4.9 km	MPC · JPL
246142	2007 PC_{3}	—	August 4, 2007	Siding Spring	SSS	·	2.7 km	MPC · JPL
246143	2007 PF_{5}	—	August 5, 2007	Socorro	LINEAR	·	2.2 km	MPC · JPL
246144	2007 PA_{6}	—	August 8, 2007	Socorro	LINEAR	·	840 m	MPC · JPL
246145	2007 PE_{9}	—	August 11, 2007	Dauban	Chante-Perdrix	L4 · ERY	12 km	MPC · JPL
246146	2007 PQ_{10}	—	August 9, 2007	Socorro	LINEAR	·	2.5 km	MPC · JPL
246147	2007 PM_{16}	—	August 8, 2007	Socorro	LINEAR	L4	13 km	MPC · JPL
246148	2007 PC_{24}	—	August 12, 2007	Socorro	LINEAR	·	1.4 km	MPC · JPL
246149	2007 PE_{24}	—	August 12, 2007	Socorro	LINEAR	·	1.6 km	MPC · JPL
246150	2007 PF_{24}	—	August 12, 2007	Socorro	LINEAR	DOR	4.0 km	MPC · JPL
246151	2007 PW_{24}	—	August 12, 2007	Socorro	LINEAR	·	990 m	MPC · JPL
246152	2007 PX_{25}	—	August 8, 2007	Socorro	LINEAR	(2076)	910 m	MPC · JPL
246153 Waltermaria	2007 PW_{30}	Waltermaria	August 15, 2007	San Marcello	M. Mazzucato, Dolfi, F.	NYS	1.6 km	MPC · JPL
246154	2007 PB_{31}	—	August 5, 2007	Socorro	LINEAR	·	1.3 km	MPC · JPL
246155	2007 PR_{33}	—	August 12, 2007	Socorro	LINEAR	·	1.6 km	MPC · JPL
246156	2007 PF_{35}	—	August 9, 2007	Socorro	LINEAR	·	940 m	MPC · JPL
246157	2007 PT_{35}	—	August 11, 2007	Socorro	LINEAR	·	1.1 km	MPC · JPL
246158	2007 PC_{37}	—	August 13, 2007	Socorro	LINEAR	·	1.7 km	MPC · JPL
246159	2007 PY_{39}	—	August 15, 2007	Socorro	LINEAR	·	940 m	MPC · JPL
246160	2007 PE_{40}	—	August 10, 2007	Kitt Peak	Spacewatch	·	1.8 km	MPC · JPL
246161	2007 PQ_{45}	—	August 13, 2007	Siding Spring	SSS	·	2.3 km	MPC · JPL
246162	2007 QR	—	August 16, 2007	Purple Mountain	PMO NEO Survey Program	·	2.8 km	MPC · JPL
246163	2007 QV_{2}	—	August 19, 2007	La Sagra	OAM	·	1.9 km	MPC · JPL
246164 Zdvyzhensk	2007 QH_{3}	Zdvyzhensk	August 22, 2007	Andrushivka	Andrushivka	V	1.1 km	MPC · JPL
246165	2007 QT_{11}	—	August 23, 2007	Kitt Peak	Spacewatch	·	820 m	MPC · JPL
246166	2007 RQ_{5}	—	September 5, 2007	La Sagra	OAM	EUN	2.1 km	MPC · JPL
246167 Joskohn	2007 RF_{8}	Joskohn	September 5, 2007	Marly	P. Kocher	ADE	4.0 km	MPC · JPL
246168	2007 RE_{13}	—	September 3, 2007	Catalina	CSS	·	1.8 km	MPC · JPL
246169	2007 RQ_{13}	—	September 11, 2007	Goodricke-Pigott	R. A. Tucker	·	1.1 km	MPC · JPL
246170	2007 RY_{13}	—	September 6, 2007	La Sagra	OAM	DOR	3.7 km	MPC · JPL
246171 Konrad	2007 RU_{15}	Konrad	September 4, 2007	Rimbach	Koenig, M.	·	3.4 km	MPC · JPL
246172	2007 RL_{16}	—	September 13, 2007	Mayhill	Lowe, A.	·	1.7 km	MPC · JPL
246173	2007 RN_{17}	—	September 12, 2007	Bisei SG Center	BATTeRS	·	1.2 km	MPC · JPL
246174	2007 RF_{23}	—	September 3, 2007	Catalina	CSS	·	4.5 km	MPC · JPL
246175	2007 RT_{27}	—	September 4, 2007	Catalina	CSS	·	2.4 km	MPC · JPL
246176	2007 RV_{32}	—	September 5, 2007	Catalina	CSS	·	3.8 km	MPC · JPL
246177	2007 RN_{33}	—	September 5, 2007	Catalina	CSS	·	1.1 km	MPC · JPL
246178	2007 RD_{38}	—	September 8, 2007	Anderson Mesa	LONEOS	HIL · 3:2	8.1 km	MPC · JPL
246179	2007 RL_{38}	—	September 8, 2007	Anderson Mesa	LONEOS	MAS	970 m	MPC · JPL
246180	2007 RC_{45}	—	September 9, 2007	Kitt Peak	Spacewatch	·	1.1 km	MPC · JPL
246181	2007 RP_{47}	—	September 9, 2007	Mount Lemmon	Mount Lemmon Survey	·	1.3 km	MPC · JPL
246182	2007 RS_{48}	—	September 9, 2007	Mount Lemmon	Mount Lemmon Survey	·	950 m	MPC · JPL
246183	2007 RC_{57}	—	September 9, 2007	Kitt Peak	Spacewatch	·	2.1 km	MPC · JPL
246184	2007 RA_{58}	—	September 9, 2007	Anderson Mesa	LONEOS	EUP	5.0 km	MPC · JPL
246185	2007 RH_{58}	—	September 9, 2007	Kitt Peak	Spacewatch	·	5.4 km	MPC · JPL
246186	2007 RN_{58}	—	September 9, 2007	Kitt Peak	Spacewatch	·	2.9 km	MPC · JPL
246187	2007 RO_{58}	—	September 9, 2007	Kitt Peak	Spacewatch	EUN	2.1 km	MPC · JPL
246188	2007 RY_{68}	—	September 10, 2007	Kitt Peak	Spacewatch	·	3.8 km	MPC · JPL
246189	2007 RE_{69}	—	September 10, 2007	Kitt Peak	Spacewatch	·	2.2 km	MPC · JPL
246190	2007 RT_{82}	—	September 10, 2007	Mount Lemmon	Mount Lemmon Survey	·	850 m	MPC · JPL
246191	2007 RY_{83}	—	September 10, 2007	Kitt Peak	Spacewatch	·	4.0 km	MPC · JPL
246192	2007 RH_{88}	—	September 10, 2007	Mount Lemmon	Mount Lemmon Survey	·	3.0 km	MPC · JPL
246193	2007 RD_{99}	—	September 11, 2007	Kitt Peak	Spacewatch	·	1.7 km	MPC · JPL
246194	2007 RG_{102}	—	September 11, 2007	Catalina	CSS	·	2.4 km	MPC · JPL
246195	2007 RD_{106}	—	September 11, 2007	Catalina	CSS	·	1.9 km	MPC · JPL
246196	2007 RR_{109}	—	September 11, 2007	Kitt Peak	Spacewatch	·	1.8 km	MPC · JPL
246197	2007 RY_{116}	—	September 11, 2007	Kitt Peak	Spacewatch	·	5.3 km	MPC · JPL
246198	2007 RW_{128}	—	September 12, 2007	Mount Lemmon	Mount Lemmon Survey	·	2.8 km	MPC · JPL
246199	2007 RM_{129}	—	September 12, 2007	Mount Lemmon	Mount Lemmon Survey	NYS	1.3 km	MPC · JPL
246200	2007 RN_{132}	—	September 13, 2007	Mount Lemmon	Mount Lemmon Survey	KOR	1.8 km	MPC · JPL

== 246201–246300 ==
back to top

Designation			Discovery			Properties		Ref
Permanent	Provisional	Named after	Date	Site	Discoverer(s)	Category	Diam.	Ref
246201	2007 RH_{135}	—	September 12, 2007	Goodricke-Pigott	R. A. Tucker	·	3.1 km	MPC · JPL
246202	2007 RC_{136}	—	September 14, 2007	Mount Lemmon	Mount Lemmon Survey	·	740 m	MPC · JPL
246203	2007 RO_{139}	—	September 13, 2007	Socorro	LINEAR	PHO	4.4 km	MPC · JPL
246204	2007 RA_{142}	—	September 13, 2007	Socorro	LINEAR	·	1.5 km	MPC · JPL
246205	2007 RY_{142}	—	September 14, 2007	Socorro	LINEAR	·	1.9 km	MPC · JPL
246206	2007 RV_{143}	—	September 14, 2007	Socorro	LINEAR	·	740 m	MPC · JPL
246207	2007 RS_{144}	—	September 14, 2007	Socorro	LINEAR	·	3.0 km	MPC · JPL
246208	2007 RW_{144}	—	September 14, 2007	Socorro	LINEAR	WIT	1.4 km	MPC · JPL
246209	2007 RZ_{149}	—	September 12, 2007	Lulin	LUSS	EOS	3.1 km	MPC · JPL
246210	2007 RF_{150}	—	September 13, 2007	Catalina	CSS	·	4.0 km	MPC · JPL
246211	2007 RE_{153}	—	September 10, 2007	Kitt Peak	Spacewatch	·	4.2 km	MPC · JPL
246212	2007 RR_{164}	—	September 10, 2007	Kitt Peak	Spacewatch	·	3.8 km	MPC · JPL
246213	2007 RP_{165}	—	September 10, 2007	Kitt Peak	Spacewatch	·	2.9 km	MPC · JPL
246214	2007 RE_{167}	—	September 10, 2007	Kitt Peak	Spacewatch	·	3.5 km	MPC · JPL
246215	2007 RC_{169}	—	September 10, 2007	Kitt Peak	Spacewatch	(11882)	1.9 km	MPC · JPL
246216	2007 RL_{173}	—	September 10, 2007	Kitt Peak	Spacewatch	NYS	1.4 km	MPC · JPL
246217	2007 RX_{175}	—	September 8, 2007	Mount Lemmon	Mount Lemmon Survey	·	2.7 km	MPC · JPL
246218	2007 RE_{176}	—	September 9, 2007	Mount Lemmon	Mount Lemmon Survey	·	3.3 km	MPC · JPL
246219	2007 RF_{179}	—	September 10, 2007	Mount Lemmon	Mount Lemmon Survey	·	3.8 km	MPC · JPL
246220	2007 RK_{186}	—	September 13, 2007	Mount Lemmon	Mount Lemmon Survey	·	1.0 km	MPC · JPL
246221	2007 RR_{194}	—	September 12, 2007	Kitt Peak	Spacewatch	MAS	780 m	MPC · JPL
246222	2007 RL_{203}	—	September 13, 2007	Kitt Peak	Spacewatch	·	1.9 km	MPC · JPL
246223	2007 RX_{204}	—	September 9, 2007	Kitt Peak	Spacewatch	·	5.8 km	MPC · JPL
246224	2007 RU_{208}	—	September 10, 2007	Kitt Peak	Spacewatch	·	1.6 km	MPC · JPL
246225	2007 RX_{209}	—	September 10, 2007	Kitt Peak	Spacewatch	·	1.2 km	MPC · JPL
246226	2007 RH_{212}	—	September 11, 2007	Kitt Peak	Spacewatch	CLA	2.2 km	MPC · JPL
246227	2007 RJ_{217}	—	September 13, 2007	Mount Lemmon	Mount Lemmon Survey	ERI	2.4 km	MPC · JPL
246228	2007 RK_{232}	—	September 11, 2007	Purple Mountain	PMO NEO Survey Program	·	1.6 km	MPC · JPL
246229	2007 RQ_{232}	—	September 11, 2007	Purple Mountain	PMO NEO Survey Program	HOF	4.0 km	MPC · JPL
246230	2007 RU_{239}	—	September 14, 2007	Catalina	CSS	V	960 m	MPC · JPL
246231	2007 RC_{241}	—	September 10, 2007	Catalina	CSS	·	3.6 km	MPC · JPL
246232	2007 RN_{241}	—	September 12, 2007	Catalina	CSS	·	960 m	MPC · JPL
246233	2007 RW_{250}	—	September 13, 2007	Kitt Peak	Spacewatch	·	1.5 km	MPC · JPL
246234	2007 RT_{254}	—	September 14, 2007	Kitt Peak	Spacewatch	HNS	1.4 km	MPC · JPL
246235	2007 RK_{256}	—	September 14, 2007	Catalina	CSS	·	1.6 km	MPC · JPL
246236	2007 RV_{260}	—	September 14, 2007	Kitt Peak	Spacewatch	·	2.3 km	MPC · JPL
246237	2007 RB_{274}	—	September 15, 2007	Kitt Peak	Spacewatch	·	3.7 km	MPC · JPL
246238 Crampton	2007 RL_{274}	Crampton	September 5, 2007	Mauna Kea	D. D. Balam	·	5.7 km	MPC · JPL
246239	2007 RF_{278}	—	September 5, 2007	Catalina	CSS	·	3.3 km	MPC · JPL
246240	2007 RY_{286}	—	September 5, 2007	Catalina	CSS	·	3.2 km	MPC · JPL
246241	2007 RQ_{301}	—	September 13, 2007	Mount Lemmon	Mount Lemmon Survey	·	2.5 km	MPC · JPL
246242	2007 RW_{309}	—	September 13, 2007	Mount Lemmon	Mount Lemmon Survey	·	3.9 km	MPC · JPL
246243	2007 RH_{323}	—	September 15, 2007	Mount Lemmon	Mount Lemmon Survey	·	3.0 km	MPC · JPL
246244	2007 SV_{5}	—	September 19, 2007	Socorro	LINEAR	·	800 m	MPC · JPL
246245	2007 SX_{5}	—	September 21, 2007	Socorro	LINEAR	NYS	1.4 km	MPC · JPL
246246	2007 SD_{7}	—	September 18, 2007	Kitt Peak	Spacewatch	·	1.2 km	MPC · JPL
246247 Sheldoncooper	2007 SP_{14}	Sheldoncooper	September 20, 2007	Lulin	Q. Ye, Lin, H.-C.	·	3.1 km	MPC · JPL
246248	2007 TX	—	October 2, 2007	Charleston	Astronomical Research Observatory	EOS	3.2 km	MPC · JPL
246249	2007 TV_{3}	—	October 5, 2007	Bergisch Gladbach	W. Bickel	EOS	2.4 km	MPC · JPL
246250	2007 TN_{4}	—	October 6, 2007	7300	W. K. Y. Yeung	V	790 m	MPC · JPL
246251	2007 TU_{6}	—	October 6, 2007	La Sagra	OAM	EUP	6.9 km	MPC · JPL
246252	2007 TY_{6}	—	October 6, 2007	La Sagra	OAM	·	5.2 km	MPC · JPL
246253	2007 TF_{7}	—	October 7, 2007	Dauban	Chante-Perdrix	·	1.0 km	MPC · JPL
246254	2007 TV_{7}	—	October 7, 2007	Altschwendt	W. Ries	·	4.2 km	MPC · JPL
246255	2007 TR_{12}	—	October 6, 2007	Socorro	LINEAR	·	910 m	MPC · JPL
246256	2007 TQ_{13}	—	October 6, 2007	Socorro	LINEAR	·	4.3 km	MPC · JPL
246257	2007 TS_{13}	—	October 6, 2007	Socorro	LINEAR	JUN	1.7 km	MPC · JPL
246258	2007 TU_{14}	—	October 8, 2007	Altschwendt	W. Ries	NYS	1.4 km	MPC · JPL
246259	2007 TC_{15}	—	October 8, 2007	7300	W. K. Y. Yeung	·	1.4 km	MPC · JPL
246260	2007 TV_{16}	—	October 6, 2007	Kitt Peak	Spacewatch	JUN	1.4 km	MPC · JPL
246261	2007 TW_{16}	—	October 6, 2007	Kitt Peak	Spacewatch	·	2.4 km	MPC · JPL
246262	2007 TJ_{17}	—	October 7, 2007	Calvin-Rehoboth	Calvin College	·	630 m	MPC · JPL
246263	2007 TV_{17}	—	October 7, 2007	Dauban	Chante-Perdrix	·	990 m	MPC · JPL
246264	2007 TR_{25}	—	October 4, 2007	Kitt Peak	Spacewatch	·	1.8 km	MPC · JPL
246265	2007 TY_{25}	—	October 4, 2007	Kitt Peak	Spacewatch	·	2.1 km	MPC · JPL
246266	2007 TW_{26}	—	October 4, 2007	Kitt Peak	Spacewatch	VER	4.1 km	MPC · JPL
246267	2007 TN_{29}	—	October 4, 2007	Kitt Peak	Spacewatch	HOF	3.1 km	MPC · JPL
246268	2007 TD_{30}	—	October 4, 2007	Kitt Peak	Spacewatch	·	3.6 km	MPC · JPL
246269	2007 TF_{32}	—	October 6, 2007	Kitt Peak	Spacewatch	DOR	2.8 km	MPC · JPL
246270	2007 TR_{34}	—	October 6, 2007	Kitt Peak	Spacewatch	·	5.9 km	MPC · JPL
246271	2007 TJ_{40}	—	October 6, 2007	Kitt Peak	Spacewatch	·	1.0 km	MPC · JPL
246272	2007 TO_{41}	—	October 6, 2007	Kitt Peak	Spacewatch	·	2.0 km	MPC · JPL
246273	2007 TW_{44}	—	October 7, 2007	Catalina	CSS	·	4.1 km	MPC · JPL
246274	2007 TY_{45}	—	October 7, 2007	Catalina	CSS	TIR	4.4 km	MPC · JPL
246275	2007 TS_{46}	—	October 4, 2007	Kitt Peak	Spacewatch	·	3.0 km	MPC · JPL
246276	2007 TQ_{47}	—	October 4, 2007	Kitt Peak	Spacewatch	AGN	1.5 km	MPC · JPL
246277	2007 TG_{54}	—	October 4, 2007	Kitt Peak	Spacewatch	·	2.2 km	MPC · JPL
246278	2007 TT_{54}	—	October 4, 2007	Kitt Peak	Spacewatch	·	3.2 km	MPC · JPL
246279	2007 TE_{55}	—	October 4, 2007	Kitt Peak	Spacewatch	EOS	2.2 km	MPC · JPL
246280	2007 TU_{64}	—	October 7, 2007	Mount Lemmon	Mount Lemmon Survey	·	3.3 km	MPC · JPL
246281	2007 TC_{65}	—	October 7, 2007	Mount Lemmon	Mount Lemmon Survey	·	2.6 km	MPC · JPL
246282	2007 TH_{65}	—	October 7, 2007	Mount Lemmon	Mount Lemmon Survey	·	2.5 km	MPC · JPL
246283	2007 TF_{66}	—	October 5, 2007	Bisei SG Center	BATTeRS	NYS	1.5 km	MPC · JPL
246284	2007 TD_{67}	—	October 12, 2007	Dauban	Chante-Perdrix	·	2.7 km	MPC · JPL
246285	2007 TK_{67}	—	October 7, 2007	Catalina	CSS	·	3.0 km	MPC · JPL
246286	2007 TS_{67}	—	October 8, 2007	Anderson Mesa	LONEOS	·	2.9 km	MPC · JPL
246287	2007 TX_{70}	—	October 13, 2007	Goodricke-Pigott	R. A. Tucker	THM	3.2 km	MPC · JPL
246288	2007 TS_{72}	—	October 7, 2007	Socorro	LINEAR	·	960 m	MPC · JPL
246289	2007 TC_{73}	—	October 14, 2007	Altschwendt	W. Ries	·	2.4 km	MPC · JPL
246290	2007 TH_{76}	—	October 5, 2007	Kitt Peak	Spacewatch	·	4.1 km	MPC · JPL
246291	2007 TQ_{76}	—	October 5, 2007	Kitt Peak	Spacewatch	·	690 m	MPC · JPL
246292	2007 TW_{77}	—	October 5, 2007	Kitt Peak	Spacewatch	·	2.6 km	MPC · JPL
246293	2007 TH_{79}	—	October 5, 2007	Kitt Peak	Spacewatch	·	1.4 km	MPC · JPL
246294	2007 TN_{81}	—	October 7, 2007	Catalina	CSS	·	2.1 km	MPC · JPL
246295	2007 TF_{82}	—	October 8, 2007	Mount Lemmon	Mount Lemmon Survey	EUN	1.3 km	MPC · JPL
246296	2007 TR_{89}	—	October 8, 2007	Mount Lemmon	Mount Lemmon Survey	·	4.0 km	MPC · JPL
246297	2007 TU_{101}	—	October 8, 2007	Mount Lemmon	Mount Lemmon Survey	·	2.9 km	MPC · JPL
246298	2007 TE_{102}	—	October 8, 2007	Anderson Mesa	LONEOS	·	1.4 km	MPC · JPL
246299	2007 TF_{104}	—	October 8, 2007	Mount Lemmon	Mount Lemmon Survey	·	2.5 km	MPC · JPL
246300	2007 TN_{104}	—	October 8, 2007	Mount Lemmon	Mount Lemmon Survey	THM	2.5 km	MPC · JPL

== 246301–246400 ==
back to top

Designation			Discovery			Properties		Ref
Permanent	Provisional	Named after	Date	Site	Discoverer(s)	Category	Diam.	Ref
246301	2007 TF_{116}	—	October 8, 2007	Mount Lemmon	Mount Lemmon Survey	·	3.2 km	MPC · JPL
246302	2007 TW_{125}	—	October 6, 2007	Kitt Peak	Spacewatch	·	2.4 km	MPC · JPL
246303	2007 TB_{129}	—	October 6, 2007	Kitt Peak	Spacewatch	·	1.1 km	MPC · JPL
246304	2007 TZ_{129}	—	October 6, 2007	Kitt Peak	Spacewatch	·	860 m	MPC · JPL
246305	2007 TD_{135}	—	October 8, 2007	Kitt Peak	Spacewatch	·	2.0 km	MPC · JPL
246306	2007 TX_{140}	—	October 9, 2007	Mount Lemmon	Mount Lemmon Survey	NYS	1.4 km	MPC · JPL
246307	2007 TV_{147}	—	October 7, 2007	Socorro	LINEAR	·	860 m	MPC · JPL
246308	2007 TX_{147}	—	October 7, 2007	Socorro	LINEAR	·	2.5 km	MPC · JPL
246309	2007 TY_{147}	—	October 7, 2007	Socorro	LINEAR	slow	5.5 km	MPC · JPL
246310	2007 TM_{153}	—	October 9, 2007	Socorro	LINEAR	NYS	1.5 km	MPC · JPL
246311	2007 TX_{157}	—	October 9, 2007	Socorro	LINEAR	HNS	1.6 km	MPC · JPL
246312	2007 TT_{158}	—	October 9, 2007	Socorro	LINEAR	·	4.7 km	MPC · JPL
246313	2007 TJ_{160}	—	October 9, 2007	Socorro	LINEAR	EOS	3.1 km	MPC · JPL
246314	2007 TV_{164}	—	October 11, 2007	Socorro	LINEAR	NEM	2.8 km	MPC · JPL
246315	2007 TA_{167}	—	October 12, 2007	Socorro	LINEAR	·	1.5 km	MPC · JPL
246316	2007 TP_{167}	—	October 12, 2007	Socorro	LINEAR	NYS	1.7 km	MPC · JPL
246317	2007 TV_{168}	—	October 12, 2007	Socorro	LINEAR	·	3.1 km	MPC · JPL
246318	2007 TZ_{169}	—	October 12, 2007	Socorro	LINEAR	·	3.3 km	MPC · JPL
246319	2007 TQ_{172}	—	October 13, 2007	Socorro	LINEAR	EUP	5.8 km	MPC · JPL
246320	2007 TB_{181}	—	October 8, 2007	Anderson Mesa	LONEOS	·	880 m	MPC · JPL
246321	2007 TR_{181}	—	October 8, 2007	Anderson Mesa	LONEOS	·	3.0 km	MPC · JPL
246322	2007 TH_{183}	—	October 9, 2007	Kitt Peak	Spacewatch	EOS	2.4 km	MPC · JPL
246323	2007 TF_{192}	—	October 5, 2007	Kitt Peak	Spacewatch	EOS	2.2 km	MPC · JPL
246324	2007 TE_{200}	—	October 8, 2007	Kitt Peak	Spacewatch	·	1.5 km	MPC · JPL
246325	2007 TD_{214}	—	October 7, 2007	Kitt Peak	Spacewatch	·	2.5 km	MPC · JPL
246326	2007 TK_{215}	—	October 7, 2007	Kitt Peak	Spacewatch	·	1.4 km	MPC · JPL
246327	2007 TR_{218}	—	October 7, 2007	Kitt Peak	Spacewatch	·	1.7 km	MPC · JPL
246328	2007 TE_{226}	—	October 8, 2007	Kitt Peak	Spacewatch	KOR	1.4 km	MPC · JPL
246329	2007 TT_{228}	—	October 8, 2007	Kitt Peak	Spacewatch	·	2.7 km	MPC · JPL
246330	2007 TE_{229}	—	October 8, 2007	Kitt Peak	Spacewatch	·	3.9 km	MPC · JPL
246331	2007 TB_{234}	—	October 8, 2007	Kitt Peak	Spacewatch	·	1.6 km	MPC · JPL
246332	2007 TJ_{234}	—	October 8, 2007	Kitt Peak	Spacewatch	·	2.6 km	MPC · JPL
246333 Williamdane	2007 TK_{238}	Williamdane	October 10, 2007	Charleston	Astronomical Research Observatory	fast	2.9 km	MPC · JPL
246334	2007 TF_{243}	—	October 8, 2007	Catalina	CSS	·	4.5 km	MPC · JPL
246335	2007 TJ_{244}	—	October 8, 2007	Catalina	CSS	·	2.9 km	MPC · JPL
246336	2007 TW_{244}	—	October 8, 2007	Catalina	CSS	·	950 m	MPC · JPL
246337	2007 TG_{245}	—	October 8, 2007	Catalina	CSS	EOS	4.9 km	MPC · JPL
246338	2007 TA_{250}	—	October 11, 2007	Mount Lemmon	Mount Lemmon Survey	HOF	4.6 km	MPC · JPL
246339	2007 TT_{261}	—	October 10, 2007	Kitt Peak	Spacewatch	·	1.8 km	MPC · JPL
246340	2007 TK_{282}	—	October 8, 2007	Mount Lemmon	Mount Lemmon Survey	·	2.2 km	MPC · JPL
246341	2007 TV_{287}	—	October 11, 2007	Catalina	CSS	·	2.1 km	MPC · JPL
246342	2007 TY_{287}	—	October 11, 2007	Catalina	CSS	·	2.4 km	MPC · JPL
246343	2007 TO_{290}	—	October 12, 2007	Mount Lemmon	Mount Lemmon Survey	·	4.2 km	MPC · JPL
246344	2007 TD_{294}	—	October 9, 2007	Mount Lemmon	Mount Lemmon Survey	MAR	1.5 km	MPC · JPL
246345 Carolharris	2007 TH_{298}	Carolharris	October 11, 2007	Anderson Mesa	Wasserman, L. H.	HYG	3.7 km	MPC · JPL
246346	2007 TK_{301}	—	October 12, 2007	Kitt Peak	Spacewatch	HYG	2.7 km	MPC · JPL
246347	2007 TX_{306}	—	October 8, 2007	Mount Lemmon	Mount Lemmon Survey	·	1.5 km	MPC · JPL
246348	2007 TJ_{309}	—	October 10, 2007	Mount Lemmon	Mount Lemmon Survey	·	2.2 km	MPC · JPL
246349	2007 TK_{309}	—	October 10, 2007	Mount Lemmon	Mount Lemmon Survey	·	3.2 km	MPC · JPL
246350	2007 TD_{311}	—	October 11, 2007	Catalina	CSS	·	790 m	MPC · JPL
246351	2007 TR_{311}	—	October 11, 2007	Mount Lemmon	Mount Lemmon Survey	·	1.9 km	MPC · JPL
246352	2007 TU_{314}	—	October 12, 2007	Mount Lemmon	Mount Lemmon Survey	·	1.9 km	MPC · JPL
246353	2007 TG_{318}	—	October 12, 2007	Kitt Peak	Spacewatch	·	1.4 km	MPC · JPL
246354	2007 TW_{321}	—	October 14, 2007	Catalina	CSS	·	2.7 km	MPC · JPL
246355	2007 TJ_{326}	—	October 11, 2007	Kitt Peak	Spacewatch	·	3.3 km	MPC · JPL
246356	2007 TL_{330}	—	October 11, 2007	Kitt Peak	Spacewatch	·	2.2 km	MPC · JPL
246357	2007 TP_{331}	—	October 11, 2007	Kitt Peak	Spacewatch	AGN	1.6 km	MPC · JPL
246358	2007 TX_{331}	—	October 11, 2007	Kitt Peak	Spacewatch	·	2.7 km	MPC · JPL
246359	2007 TT_{335}	—	October 12, 2007	Kitt Peak	Spacewatch	·	1 km	MPC · JPL
246360	2007 TP_{355}	—	October 11, 2007	Catalina	CSS	·	3.2 km	MPC · JPL
246361	2007 TS_{366}	—	October 9, 2007	Kitt Peak	Spacewatch	·	2.3 km	MPC · JPL
246362	2007 TB_{367}	—	October 9, 2007	Kitt Peak	Spacewatch	URS	6.2 km	MPC · JPL
246363	2007 TQ_{378}	—	October 12, 2007	Mount Lemmon	Mount Lemmon Survey	·	3.3 km	MPC · JPL
246364	2007 TS_{385}	—	October 15, 2007	Catalina	CSS	·	2.5 km	MPC · JPL
246365	2007 TV_{386}	—	October 11, 2007	Mount Lemmon	Mount Lemmon Survey	·	980 m	MPC · JPL
246366	2007 TE_{392}	—	October 15, 2007	Catalina	CSS	EOS ·	4.8 km	MPC · JPL
246367	2007 TF_{392}	—	October 15, 2007	Catalina	CSS	MAS	850 m	MPC · JPL
246368	2007 TG_{392}	—	October 15, 2007	Catalina	CSS	WIT	1.2 km	MPC · JPL
246369	2007 TR_{398}	—	October 15, 2007	Kitt Peak	Spacewatch	·	5.3 km	MPC · JPL
246370	2007 TO_{399}	—	October 15, 2007	Kitt Peak	Spacewatch	·	4.1 km	MPC · JPL
246371	2007 TO_{400}	—	October 13, 2007	Kitt Peak	Spacewatch	·	4.3 km	MPC · JPL
246372	2007 TM_{414}	—	October 15, 2007	Catalina	CSS	·	3.3 km	MPC · JPL
246373	2007 TQ_{418}	—	October 7, 2007	Kitt Peak	Spacewatch	·	2.4 km	MPC · JPL
246374	2007 TB_{419}	—	October 10, 2007	Catalina	CSS	·	2.9 km	MPC · JPL
246375	2007 TW_{419}	—	October 8, 2007	Catalina	CSS	·	5.0 km	MPC · JPL
246376	2007 TT_{427}	—	October 10, 2007	Catalina	CSS	(2076)	1.5 km	MPC · JPL
246377	2007 TH_{429}	—	October 12, 2007	Kitt Peak	Spacewatch	·	3.1 km	MPC · JPL
246378	2007 TE_{431}	—	October 12, 2007	Kitt Peak	Spacewatch	·	3.6 km	MPC · JPL
246379	2007 TR_{432}	—	October 7, 2007	Catalina	CSS	·	2.9 km	MPC · JPL
246380	2007 TW_{434}	—	October 11, 2007	Kitt Peak	Spacewatch	·	3.9 km	MPC · JPL
246381	2007 UC	—	October 16, 2007	Bisei SG Center	BATTeRS	·	1.2 km	MPC · JPL
246382	2007 UJ_{3}	—	October 18, 2007	Junk Bond	D. Healy	(194) · slow	2.9 km	MPC · JPL
246383	2007 US_{11}	—	October 19, 2007	Socorro	LINEAR	·	1.8 km	MPC · JPL
246384	2007 UW_{11}	—	October 19, 2007	Socorro	LINEAR	AEG	6.6 km	MPC · JPL
246385	2007 UD_{18}	—	October 17, 2007	Anderson Mesa	LONEOS	·	1.5 km	MPC · JPL
246386	2007 UP_{18}	—	October 17, 2007	Mount Lemmon	Mount Lemmon Survey	·	3.0 km	MPC · JPL
246387	2007 UF_{24}	—	October 16, 2007	Kitt Peak	Spacewatch	·	1.6 km	MPC · JPL
246388	2007 UX_{25}	—	October 16, 2007	Kitt Peak	Spacewatch	·	4.4 km	MPC · JPL
246389	2007 UY_{29}	—	October 19, 2007	Anderson Mesa	LONEOS	·	4.8 km	MPC · JPL
246390	2007 UE_{34}	—	October 17, 2007	Anderson Mesa	LONEOS	·	3.2 km	MPC · JPL
246391	2007 UW_{39}	—	October 20, 2007	Mount Lemmon	Mount Lemmon Survey	·	4.9 km	MPC · JPL
246392	2007 UT_{46}	—	October 20, 2007	Catalina	CSS	·	2.0 km	MPC · JPL
246393	2007 UV_{46}	—	October 20, 2007	Catalina	CSS	·	1.4 km	MPC · JPL
246394	2007 UL_{47}	—	October 17, 2007	Purple Mountain	PMO NEO Survey Program	(5)	2.0 km	MPC · JPL
246395	2007 UQ_{52}	—	October 24, 2007	Mount Lemmon	Mount Lemmon Survey	·	2.0 km	MPC · JPL
246396	2007 UF_{55}	—	October 30, 2007	Kitt Peak	Spacewatch	·	4.5 km	MPC · JPL
246397	2007 UK_{56}	—	October 30, 2007	Kitt Peak	Spacewatch	·	4.8 km	MPC · JPL
246398	2007 UN_{60}	—	October 30, 2007	Mount Lemmon	Mount Lemmon Survey	·	3.0 km	MPC · JPL
246399	2007 UN_{61}	—	October 30, 2007	Kitt Peak	Spacewatch	HOF	3.2 km	MPC · JPL
246400	2007 UG_{73}	—	October 31, 2007	Mount Lemmon	Mount Lemmon Survey	·	1.2 km	MPC · JPL

== 246401–246500 ==
back to top

Designation			Discovery			Properties		Ref
Permanent	Provisional	Named after	Date	Site	Discoverer(s)	Category	Diam.	Ref
246401	2007 UH_{79}	—	October 30, 2007	Catalina	CSS	AGN	1.6 km	MPC · JPL
246402	2007 UB_{81}	—	October 30, 2007	Kitt Peak	Spacewatch	CYB	5.5 km	MPC · JPL
246403	2007 UA_{87}	—	October 30, 2007	Kitt Peak	Spacewatch	·	2.2 km	MPC · JPL
246404	2007 UX_{88}	—	October 30, 2007	Mount Lemmon	Mount Lemmon Survey	·	2.5 km	MPC · JPL
246405	2007 UH_{96}	—	October 30, 2007	Kitt Peak	Spacewatch	(21885)	4.0 km	MPC · JPL
246406	2007 UO_{99}	—	October 30, 2007	Catalina	CSS	EOS	3.0 km	MPC · JPL
246407	2007 UE_{101}	—	October 30, 2007	Kitt Peak	Spacewatch	EUN	1.8 km	MPC · JPL
246408	2007 UR_{113}	—	October 31, 2007	Kitt Peak	Spacewatch	·	2.2 km	MPC · JPL
246409	2007 UN_{114}	—	October 31, 2007	Kitt Peak	Spacewatch	·	2.8 km	MPC · JPL
246410	2007 UH_{115}	—	October 31, 2007	Kitt Peak	Spacewatch	·	3.7 km	MPC · JPL
246411	2007 UK_{125}	—	October 31, 2007	Catalina	CSS	·	1.1 km	MPC · JPL
246412	2007 UV_{125}	—	October 29, 2007	Siding Spring	SSS	·	5.8 km	MPC · JPL
246413	2007 UF_{136}	—	October 31, 2007	Catalina	CSS	EUN	1.9 km	MPC · JPL
246414	2007 UQ_{137}	—	October 17, 2007	Mount Lemmon	Mount Lemmon Survey	·	4.4 km	MPC · JPL
246415	2007 VQ_{1}	—	November 2, 2007	7300	W. K. Y. Yeung	·	3.1 km	MPC · JPL
246416	2007 VA_{4}	—	November 2, 2007	Dauban	Chante-Perdrix	·	1.6 km	MPC · JPL
246417	2007 VO_{7}	—	November 2, 2007	Dauban	Chante-Perdrix	·	1.8 km	MPC · JPL
246418	2007 VR_{25}	—	November 2, 2007	Mount Lemmon	Mount Lemmon Survey	·	2.7 km	MPC · JPL
246419	2007 VH_{31}	—	November 2, 2007	Kitt Peak	Spacewatch	·	3.5 km	MPC · JPL
246420	2007 VN_{31}	—	November 2, 2007	Kitt Peak	Spacewatch	HOF	3.1 km	MPC · JPL
246421	2007 VC_{32}	—	November 2, 2007	Kitt Peak	Spacewatch	·	3.1 km	MPC · JPL
246422	2007 VB_{47}	—	November 1, 2007	Kitt Peak	Spacewatch	·	2.0 km	MPC · JPL
246423	2007 VF_{47}	—	November 1, 2007	Kitt Peak	Spacewatch	·	4.2 km	MPC · JPL
246424	2007 VJ_{48}	—	November 1, 2007	Kitt Peak	Spacewatch	·	3.9 km	MPC · JPL
246425	2007 VR_{53}	—	November 1, 2007	Kitt Peak	Spacewatch	·	3.8 km	MPC · JPL
246426	2007 VA_{54}	—	November 1, 2007	Kitt Peak	Spacewatch	AGN	1.7 km	MPC · JPL
246427	2007 VK_{56}	—	November 1, 2007	Kitt Peak	Spacewatch	·	1.5 km	MPC · JPL
246428	2007 VD_{65}	—	November 1, 2007	Kitt Peak	Spacewatch	·	2.8 km	MPC · JPL
246429	2007 VY_{84}	—	November 2, 2007	Kitt Peak	Spacewatch	·	3.5 km	MPC · JPL
246430	2007 VT_{86}	—	November 2, 2007	Socorro	LINEAR	WIT	1.4 km	MPC · JPL
246431	2007 VP_{87}	—	November 2, 2007	Socorro	LINEAR	·	4.2 km	MPC · JPL
246432	2007 VC_{89}	—	November 3, 2007	Socorro	LINEAR	·	3.3 km	MPC · JPL
246433	2007 VA_{90}	—	November 4, 2007	Socorro	LINEAR	·	1.4 km	MPC · JPL
246434	2007 VH_{91}	—	November 7, 2007	Socorro	LINEAR	·	3.0 km	MPC · JPL
246435	2007 VQ_{112}	—	November 3, 2007	Kitt Peak	Spacewatch	AST	3.5 km	MPC · JPL
246436	2007 VL_{116}	—	November 3, 2007	Kitt Peak	Spacewatch	·	3.1 km	MPC · JPL
246437	2007 VO_{125}	—	November 6, 2007	Kitt Peak	Spacewatch	·	1.8 km	MPC · JPL
246438	2007 VD_{141}	—	November 4, 2007	Mount Lemmon	Mount Lemmon Survey	·	3.4 km	MPC · JPL
246439	2007 VT_{153}	—	November 4, 2007	Kitt Peak	Spacewatch	·	1.4 km	MPC · JPL
246440	2007 VG_{154}	—	November 5, 2007	Kitt Peak	Spacewatch	·	1.6 km	MPC · JPL
246441	2007 VF_{158}	—	November 5, 2007	Kitt Peak	Spacewatch	·	1.6 km	MPC · JPL
246442	2007 VZ_{161}	—	November 5, 2007	Kitt Peak	Spacewatch	·	4.6 km	MPC · JPL
246443	2007 VH_{185}	—	November 6, 2007	Kitt Peak	Spacewatch	·	4.5 km	MPC · JPL
246444	2007 VJ_{185}	—	November 6, 2007	Kitt Peak	Spacewatch	·	4.0 km	MPC · JPL
246445	2007 VK_{185}	—	November 6, 2007	Purple Mountain	PMO NEO Survey Program	·	3.9 km	MPC · JPL
246446	2007 VQ_{185}	—	November 9, 2007	Kitt Peak	Spacewatch	PAD	2.1 km	MPC · JPL
246447	2007 VB_{190}	—	November 14, 2007	Mayhill	Lowe, A.	·	5.6 km	MPC · JPL
246448	2007 VV_{192}	—	November 4, 2007	Mount Lemmon	Mount Lemmon Survey	·	6.3 km	MPC · JPL
246449	2007 VZ_{209}	—	November 9, 2007	Kitt Peak	Spacewatch	·	1.5 km	MPC · JPL
246450	2007 VJ_{212}	—	November 9, 2007	Kitt Peak	Spacewatch	AGN	1.3 km	MPC · JPL
246451	2007 VY_{225}	—	November 9, 2007	Mount Lemmon	Mount Lemmon Survey	·	1.7 km	MPC · JPL
246452	2007 VP_{229}	—	November 7, 2007	Kitt Peak	Spacewatch	KOR	1.8 km	MPC · JPL
246453	2007 VH_{238}	—	November 13, 2007	Anderson Mesa	LONEOS	KOR	1.9 km	MPC · JPL
246454	2007 VL_{241}	—	November 12, 2007	Catalina	CSS	·	1.7 km	MPC · JPL
246455	2007 VE_{242}	—	November 12, 2007	Catalina	CSS	·	4.3 km	MPC · JPL
246456	2007 VF_{243}	—	November 13, 2007	Mount Lemmon	Mount Lemmon Survey	·	4.5 km	MPC · JPL
246457	2007 VU_{244}	—	November 14, 2007	Bisei SG Center	BATTeRS	·	2.2 km	MPC · JPL
246458	2007 VT_{245}	—	November 8, 2007	Catalina	CSS	·	5.4 km	MPC · JPL
246459	2007 VV_{251}	—	November 11, 2007	Purple Mountain	PMO NEO Survey Program	LIX	4.9 km	MPC · JPL
246460	2007 VD_{255}	—	November 11, 2007	Mount Lemmon	Mount Lemmon Survey	NYS	1.2 km	MPC · JPL
246461	2007 VU_{268}	—	November 12, 2007	Socorro	LINEAR	·	3.7 km	MPC · JPL
246462	2007 VJ_{274}	—	November 13, 2007	Kitt Peak	Spacewatch	·	3.5 km	MPC · JPL
246463	2007 VM_{276}	—	November 14, 2007	Kitt Peak	Spacewatch	·	2.9 km	MPC · JPL
246464	2007 VR_{298}	—	November 11, 2007	Catalina	CSS	·	4.5 km	MPC · JPL
246465	2007 VS_{301}	—	November 4, 2007	Catalina	CSS	·	6.3 km	MPC · JPL
246466	2007 VG_{306}	—	November 11, 2007	Mount Lemmon	Mount Lemmon Survey	·	2.6 km	MPC · JPL
246467	2007 VG_{310}	—	November 7, 2007	Kitt Peak	Spacewatch	·	4.7 km	MPC · JPL
246468	2007 VU_{310}	—	November 5, 2007	Kitt Peak	Spacewatch	·	2.6 km	MPC · JPL
246469	2007 VC_{317}	—	November 9, 2007	Mount Lemmon	Mount Lemmon Survey	·	4.0 km	MPC · JPL
246470	2007 VG_{330}	—	November 3, 2007	Kitt Peak	Spacewatch	·	1.8 km	MPC · JPL
246471	2007 WP_{7}	—	November 18, 2007	Socorro	LINEAR	·	3.8 km	MPC · JPL
246472	2007 WE_{15}	—	November 18, 2007	Mount Lemmon	Mount Lemmon Survey	·	2.8 km	MPC · JPL
246473	2007 WK_{17}	—	November 18, 2007	Mount Lemmon	Mount Lemmon Survey	·	2.4 km	MPC · JPL
246474	2007 WZ_{21}	—	November 17, 2007	Kitt Peak	Spacewatch	·	2.9 km	MPC · JPL
246475	2007 WL_{28}	—	November 19, 2007	Kitt Peak	Spacewatch	·	4.0 km	MPC · JPL
246476	2007 WH_{39}	—	November 16, 2007	Catalina	CSS	·	3.2 km	MPC · JPL
246477	2007 WD_{40}	—	November 17, 2007	Mount Lemmon	Mount Lemmon Survey	·	3.6 km	MPC · JPL
246478	2007 WP_{41}	—	November 18, 2007	Mount Lemmon	Mount Lemmon Survey	·	1.7 km	MPC · JPL
246479	2007 WA_{59}	—	November 19, 2007	Mount Lemmon	Mount Lemmon Survey	·	4.8 km	MPC · JPL
246480	2007 XT_{1}	—	December 3, 2007	Catalina	CSS	HOF	3.2 km	MPC · JPL
246481	2007 XB_{2}	—	December 3, 2007	Catalina	CSS	KOR	1.7 km	MPC · JPL
246482	2007 XM_{2}	—	December 3, 2007	Kitt Peak	Spacewatch	KOR	1.5 km	MPC · JPL
246483	2007 XK_{3}	—	December 3, 2007	Calvin-Rehoboth	Calvin College	·	2.2 km	MPC · JPL
246484	2007 XY_{7}	—	December 4, 2007	Catalina	CSS	·	3.2 km	MPC · JPL
246485	2007 XD_{18}	—	December 12, 2007	Great Shefford	Birtwhistle, P.	·	6.5 km	MPC · JPL
246486	2007 XH_{21}	—	December 14, 2007	Costitx	OAM	·	4.5 km	MPC · JPL
246487	2007 XR_{24}	—	December 14, 2007	La Sagra	OAM	·	3.3 km	MPC · JPL
246488	2007 XV_{30}	—	December 15, 2007	Catalina	CSS	(5)	1.8 km	MPC · JPL
246489	2007 XA_{31}	—	December 15, 2007	Kitt Peak	Spacewatch	·	3.8 km	MPC · JPL
246490	2007 XU_{56}	—	December 3, 2007	Kitt Peak	Spacewatch	·	1.3 km	MPC · JPL
246491	2007 YE_{20}	—	December 16, 2007	Kitt Peak	Spacewatch	T_{j} (2.99) · EUP	5.5 km	MPC · JPL
246492	2007 YC_{43}	—	December 30, 2007	Catalina	CSS	·	3.8 km	MPC · JPL
246493	2007 YV_{51}	—	December 30, 2007	Kitt Peak	Spacewatch	KOR	2.0 km	MPC · JPL
246494	2007 YG_{52}	—	December 30, 2007	Kitt Peak	Spacewatch	·	3.4 km	MPC · JPL
246495	2007 YS_{63}	—	December 31, 2007	Kitt Peak	Spacewatch	·	3.6 km	MPC · JPL
246496	2008 AO_{17}	—	January 10, 2008	Kitt Peak	Spacewatch	3:2	7.7 km	MPC · JPL
246497	2008 AP_{17}	—	January 10, 2008	Kitt Peak	Spacewatch	3:2	6.9 km	MPC · JPL
246498	2008 AE_{26}	—	January 10, 2008	Mount Lemmon	Mount Lemmon Survey	·	3.5 km	MPC · JPL
246499	2008 AH_{37}	—	January 10, 2008	Kitt Peak	Spacewatch	KOR	1.4 km	MPC · JPL
246500	2008 AE_{45}	—	January 10, 2008	Kitt Peak	Spacewatch	ADE	3.3 km	MPC · JPL

== 246501–246600 ==
back to top

Designation			Discovery			Properties		Ref
Permanent	Provisional	Named after	Date	Site	Discoverer(s)	Category	Diam.	Ref
246501	2008 AA_{62}	—	January 11, 2008	Kitt Peak	Spacewatch	·	4.0 km	MPC · JPL
246502	2008 AC_{72}	—	January 13, 2008	Mount Lemmon	Mount Lemmon Survey	·	5.8 km	MPC · JPL
246503	2008 AQ_{117}	—	January 11, 2008	Kitt Peak	Spacewatch	·	3.5 km	MPC · JPL
246504 Hualien	2008 BG_{16}	Hualien	January 28, 2008	Lulin	Lin, C.-S., Q. Ye	·	5.9 km	MPC · JPL
246505	2008 BT_{26}	—	January 30, 2008	Kitt Peak	Spacewatch	·	6.5 km	MPC · JPL
246506	2008 BH_{53}	—	January 19, 2008	Mount Lemmon	Mount Lemmon Survey	·	4.5 km	MPC · JPL
246507	2008 CB_{10}	—	February 2, 2008	Mount Lemmon	Mount Lemmon Survey	NEM	2.6 km	MPC · JPL
246508	2008 CQ_{73}	—	February 6, 2008	Catalina	CSS	·	3.9 km	MPC · JPL
246509	2008 CD_{89}	—	February 7, 2008	Mount Lemmon	Mount Lemmon Survey	·	3.3 km	MPC · JPL
246510	2008 CE_{102}	—	February 9, 2008	Mount Lemmon	Mount Lemmon Survey	·	3.2 km	MPC · JPL
246511	2008 CC_{131}	—	February 8, 2008	Kitt Peak	Spacewatch	·	3.0 km	MPC · JPL
246512	2008 CA_{182}	—	February 11, 2008	Mount Lemmon	Mount Lemmon Survey	·	3.0 km	MPC · JPL
246513	2008 CJ_{184}	—	February 11, 2008	Kitt Peak	Spacewatch	·	1.8 km	MPC · JPL
246514	2008 CS_{210}	—	February 2, 2008	Kitt Peak	Spacewatch	·	3.8 km	MPC · JPL
246515	2008 CK_{211}	—	February 3, 2008	Kitt Peak	Spacewatch	·	4.1 km	MPC · JPL
246516	2008 CL_{212}	—	February 7, 2008	Mount Lemmon	Mount Lemmon Survey	·	2.8 km	MPC · JPL
246517	2008 DZ_{2}	—	February 24, 2008	Kitt Peak	Spacewatch	·	3.5 km	MPC · JPL
246518	2008 DK_{40}	—	February 27, 2008	Kitt Peak	Spacewatch	·	4.4 km	MPC · JPL
246519	2008 DV_{46}	—	February 28, 2008	Kitt Peak	Spacewatch	·	5.5 km	MPC · JPL
246520	2008 DU_{54}	—	February 28, 2008	Catalina	CSS	·	2.5 km	MPC · JPL
246521	2008 EC_{78}	—	March 7, 2008	Kitt Peak	Spacewatch	·	3.3 km	MPC · JPL
246522	2008 EO_{91}	—	March 2, 2008	Catalina	CSS	·	7.4 km	MPC · JPL
246523	2008 EV_{120}	—	March 9, 2008	Kitt Peak	Spacewatch	L5	10 km	MPC · JPL
246524	2008 EX_{142}	—	March 13, 2008	Catalina	CSS	·	4.2 km	MPC · JPL
246525	2008 FR_{32}	—	March 28, 2008	Mount Lemmon	Mount Lemmon Survey	HOF	3.5 km	MPC · JPL
246526	2008 FA_{61}	—	March 29, 2008	Mount Lemmon	Mount Lemmon Survey	·	4.4 km	MPC · JPL
246527	2008 FA_{95}	—	March 29, 2008	Kitt Peak	Spacewatch	L5	14 km	MPC · JPL
246528	2008 FQ_{129}	—	March 31, 2008	Kitt Peak	Spacewatch	·	3.8 km	MPC · JPL
246529	2008 GW_{66}	—	April 6, 2008	Mount Lemmon	Mount Lemmon Survey	·	3.2 km	MPC · JPL
246530	2008 GC_{106}	—	April 11, 2008	Mount Lemmon	Mount Lemmon Survey	L5	11 km	MPC · JPL
246531	2008 GW_{134}	—	April 14, 2008	Mount Lemmon	Mount Lemmon Survey	EOS	3.7 km	MPC · JPL
246532	2008 HL_{37}	—	April 29, 2008	Dauban	Kugel, F.	VER	4.3 km	MPC · JPL
246533	2008 HT_{41}	—	April 26, 2008	Mount Lemmon	Mount Lemmon Survey	L5	9.0 km	MPC · JPL
246534	2008 KG_{43}	—	May 31, 2008	Kitt Peak	Spacewatch	L5	14 km	MPC · JPL
246535	2008 MN_{5}	—	June 30, 2008	Siding Spring	SSS	·	5.5 km	MPC · JPL
246536	2008 NQ_{2}	—	July 9, 2008	Dauban	Kugel, F.	·	1.3 km	MPC · JPL
246537	2008 PQ_{10}	—	August 7, 2008	La Sagra	OAM	·	1.5 km	MPC · JPL
246538	2008 QF_{6}	—	August 25, 2008	Dauban	Kugel, F.	·	4.0 km	MPC · JPL
246539	2008 RF_{8}	—	September 3, 2008	Kitt Peak	Spacewatch	·	3.6 km	MPC · JPL
246540	2008 RW_{39}	—	September 2, 2008	Kitt Peak	Spacewatch	·	1.5 km	MPC · JPL
246541	2008 RU_{46}	—	September 2, 2008	Kitt Peak	Spacewatch	·	1.8 km	MPC · JPL
246542	2008 RW_{64}	—	September 4, 2008	Kitt Peak	Spacewatch	HOF	3.9 km	MPC · JPL
246543	2008 RM_{80}	—	September 3, 2008	Kitt Peak	Spacewatch	·	1.1 km	MPC · JPL
246544	2008 RV_{80}	—	September 3, 2008	Kitt Peak	Spacewatch	·	3.9 km	MPC · JPL
246545	2008 RT_{81}	—	September 4, 2008	Kitt Peak	Spacewatch	HOF	3.6 km	MPC · JPL
246546	2008 SM_{12}	—	September 24, 2008	Kitt Peak	Spacewatch	L4	11 km	MPC · JPL
246547	2008 SS_{12}	—	September 20, 2008	Mount Lemmon	Mount Lemmon Survey	·	1.7 km	MPC · JPL
246548	2008 SL_{22}	—	September 19, 2008	Kitt Peak	Spacewatch	·	4.2 km	MPC · JPL
246549	2008 SA_{42}	—	September 20, 2008	Mount Lemmon	Mount Lemmon Survey	·	3.1 km	MPC · JPL
246550	2008 SO_{47}	—	September 20, 2008	Catalina	CSS	L4	15 km	MPC · JPL
246551	2008 SK_{72}	—	September 22, 2008	Kitt Peak	Spacewatch	·	2.1 km	MPC · JPL
246552	2008 SR_{90}	—	September 21, 2008	Kitt Peak	Spacewatch	H	650 m	MPC · JPL
246553	2008 SJ_{98}	—	September 21, 2008	Kitt Peak	Spacewatch	EMA	4.5 km	MPC · JPL
246554	2008 SC_{99}	—	September 21, 2008	Kitt Peak	Spacewatch	DOR	3.7 km	MPC · JPL
246555	2008 SO_{99}	—	September 21, 2008	Kitt Peak	Spacewatch	·	2.4 km	MPC · JPL
246556	2008 SO_{102}	—	September 21, 2008	Mount Lemmon	Mount Lemmon Survey	·	2.9 km	MPC · JPL
246557	2008 SZ_{112}	—	September 22, 2008	Kitt Peak	Spacewatch	·	4.1 km	MPC · JPL
246558	2008 SR_{118}	—	September 22, 2008	Mount Lemmon	Mount Lemmon Survey	·	3.3 km	MPC · JPL
246559	2008 SG_{142}	—	September 24, 2008	Mount Lemmon	Mount Lemmon Survey	·	1.3 km	MPC · JPL
246560	2008 SA_{158}	—	September 24, 2008	Socorro	LINEAR	L4	12 km	MPC · JPL
246561	2008 SM_{160}	—	September 24, 2008	Socorro	LINEAR	·	2.5 km	MPC · JPL
246562	2008 SS_{167}	—	September 28, 2008	Socorro	LINEAR	·	1.8 km	MPC · JPL
246563	2008 SQ_{172}	—	September 22, 2008	Kitt Peak	Spacewatch	HOF	3.1 km	MPC · JPL
246564	2008 SW_{180}	—	September 24, 2008	Kitt Peak	Spacewatch	·	2.8 km	MPC · JPL
246565	2008 SY_{192}	—	September 25, 2008	Kitt Peak	Spacewatch	EUN	1.3 km	MPC · JPL
246566	2008 SQ_{194}	—	September 25, 2008	Kitt Peak	Spacewatch	·	2.2 km	MPC · JPL
246567	2008 SD_{261}	—	September 23, 2008	Kitt Peak	Spacewatch	KOR	1.4 km	MPC · JPL
246568	2008 SO_{263}	—	September 24, 2008	Mount Lemmon	Mount Lemmon Survey	HNS	1.3 km	MPC · JPL
246569	2008 TK_{19}	—	October 1, 2008	Mount Lemmon	Mount Lemmon Survey	·	2.1 km	MPC · JPL
246570	2008 TK_{21}	—	October 1, 2008	Mount Lemmon	Mount Lemmon Survey	·	1.4 km	MPC · JPL
246571	2008 TE_{59}	—	October 2, 2008	Kitt Peak	Spacewatch	·	1.7 km	MPC · JPL
246572	2008 TS_{72}	—	October 2, 2008	Kitt Peak	Spacewatch	·	2.8 km	MPC · JPL
246573	2008 TN_{112}	—	October 6, 2008	Catalina	CSS	·	2.9 km	MPC · JPL
246574	2008 TV_{135}	—	October 8, 2008	Kitt Peak	Spacewatch	ANF	1.6 km	MPC · JPL
246575	2008 TP_{164}	—	October 1, 2008	Kitt Peak	Spacewatch	·	2.5 km	MPC · JPL
246576	2008 TY_{171}	—	October 8, 2008	Catalina	CSS	·	2.5 km	MPC · JPL
246577	2008 TT_{176}	—	October 3, 2008	Mount Lemmon	Mount Lemmon Survey	·	1.6 km	MPC · JPL
246578	2008 UH_{5}	—	October 24, 2008	Socorro	LINEAR	T_{j} (2.94) · 3:2	6.9 km	MPC · JPL
246579	2008 UX_{31}	—	October 20, 2008	Kitt Peak	Spacewatch	·	710 m	MPC · JPL
246580	2008 UM_{40}	—	October 20, 2008	Kitt Peak	Spacewatch	EUP	5.2 km	MPC · JPL
246581	2008 US_{40}	—	October 20, 2008	Kitt Peak	Spacewatch	·	2.0 km	MPC · JPL
246582	2008 UJ_{54}	—	October 20, 2008	Kitt Peak	Spacewatch	·	1.1 km	MPC · JPL
246583	2008 UT_{71}	—	October 21, 2008	Mount Lemmon	Mount Lemmon Survey	·	1.3 km	MPC · JPL
246584	2008 UD_{87}	—	October 23, 2008	Mount Lemmon	Mount Lemmon Survey	·	910 m	MPC · JPL
246585	2008 UE_{89}	—	October 24, 2008	Kitt Peak	Spacewatch	·	1.3 km	MPC · JPL
246586	2008 UX_{92}	—	October 24, 2008	Socorro	LINEAR	V	1 km	MPC · JPL
246587	2008 UP_{93}	—	October 25, 2008	Socorro	LINEAR	·	2.1 km	MPC · JPL
246588	2008 UG_{94}	—	October 25, 2008	Socorro	LINEAR	·	3.7 km	MPC · JPL
246589	2008 UD_{114}	—	October 22, 2008	Kitt Peak	Spacewatch	·	1.9 km	MPC · JPL
246590	2008 UT_{119}	—	October 22, 2008	Kitt Peak	Spacewatch	·	3.9 km	MPC · JPL
246591	2008 UU_{144}	—	October 23, 2008	Kitt Peak	Spacewatch	·	1.5 km	MPC · JPL
246592	2008 UW_{155}	—	October 23, 2008	Kitt Peak	Spacewatch	·	1.6 km	MPC · JPL
246593	2008 UY_{157}	—	October 23, 2008	Mount Lemmon	Mount Lemmon Survey	·	3.0 km	MPC · JPL
246594	2008 US_{163}	—	October 24, 2008	Kitt Peak	Spacewatch	·	1.5 km	MPC · JPL
246595	2008 UJ_{246}	—	October 26, 2008	Mount Lemmon	Mount Lemmon Survey	·	1.7 km	MPC · JPL
246596	2008 UQ_{261}	—	October 27, 2008	Kitt Peak	Spacewatch	·	3.5 km	MPC · JPL
246597	2008 UK_{279}	—	October 28, 2008	Mount Lemmon	Mount Lemmon Survey	·	3.8 km	MPC · JPL
246598	2008 UT_{316}	—	October 30, 2008	Mount Lemmon	Mount Lemmon Survey	·	7.1 km	MPC · JPL
246599	2008 UO_{317}	—	October 31, 2008	Catalina	CSS	PHO	1.6 km	MPC · JPL
246600	2008 UQ_{322}	—	October 31, 2008	Mount Lemmon	Mount Lemmon Survey	V	980 m	MPC · JPL

== 246601–246700 ==
back to top

Designation			Discovery			Properties		Ref
Permanent	Provisional	Named after	Date	Site	Discoverer(s)	Category	Diam.	Ref
246601	2008 UC_{329}	—	October 30, 2008	Mount Lemmon	Mount Lemmon Survey	(883)	870 m	MPC · JPL
246602	2008 UF_{335}	—	October 21, 2008	Kitt Peak	Spacewatch	·	2.5 km	MPC · JPL
246603	2008 UC_{346}	—	October 29, 2008	Kitt Peak	Spacewatch	·	4.9 km	MPC · JPL
246604	2008 UJ_{352}	—	October 31, 2008	Mount Lemmon	Mount Lemmon Survey	·	5.2 km	MPC · JPL
246605	2008 VR_{20}	—	November 1, 2008	Mount Lemmon	Mount Lemmon Survey	·	1.3 km	MPC · JPL
246606	2008 VM_{21}	—	November 1, 2008	Mount Lemmon	Mount Lemmon Survey	·	2.3 km	MPC · JPL
246607	2008 VB_{25}	—	November 2, 2008	Kitt Peak	Spacewatch	·	2.2 km	MPC · JPL
246608	2008 VF_{64}	—	November 9, 2008	La Sagra	OAM	·	2.8 km	MPC · JPL
246609	2008 VL_{67}	—	November 7, 2008	Mount Lemmon	Mount Lemmon Survey	URS	4.6 km	MPC · JPL
246610	2008 VR_{68}	—	November 3, 2008	Kitt Peak	Spacewatch	·	4.6 km	MPC · JPL
246611	2008 VE_{69}	—	November 6, 2008	Mount Lemmon	Mount Lemmon Survey	·	1.9 km	MPC · JPL
246612	2008 VJ_{69}	—	November 7, 2008	Catalina	CSS	·	2.1 km	MPC · JPL
246613	2008 VW_{71}	—	November 3, 2008	Catalina	CSS	·	3.7 km	MPC · JPL
246614	2008 VK_{72}	—	November 6, 2008	Mount Lemmon	Mount Lemmon Survey	·	1.0 km	MPC · JPL
246615	2008 VD_{79}	—	November 9, 2008	Mount Lemmon	Mount Lemmon Survey	·	3.6 km	MPC · JPL
246616	2008 VY_{79}	—	November 7, 2008	Mount Lemmon	Mount Lemmon Survey	·	1.5 km	MPC · JPL
246617	2008 WX_{2}	—	November 19, 2008	Bisei SG Center	BATTeRS	H	850 m	MPC · JPL
246618	2008 WF_{5}	—	November 17, 2008	Kitt Peak	Spacewatch	·	2.1 km	MPC · JPL
246619	2008 WH_{16}	—	November 17, 2008	Kitt Peak	Spacewatch	·	1.5 km	MPC · JPL
246620	2008 WH_{31}	—	November 19, 2008	Mount Lemmon	Mount Lemmon Survey	·	1.8 km	MPC · JPL
246621	2008 WG_{39}	—	November 17, 2008	Kitt Peak	Spacewatch	·	1.4 km	MPC · JPL
246622	2008 WO_{59}	—	November 18, 2008	Socorro	LINEAR	·	3.4 km	MPC · JPL
246623	2008 WQ_{65}	—	November 17, 2008	Kitt Peak	Spacewatch	·	3.1 km	MPC · JPL
246624	2008 WN_{81}	—	November 20, 2008	Kitt Peak	Spacewatch	·	4.4 km	MPC · JPL
246625	2008 WY_{86}	—	November 21, 2008	Kitt Peak	Spacewatch	·	930 m	MPC · JPL
246626	2008 WO_{87}	—	November 21, 2008	Mount Lemmon	Mount Lemmon Survey	·	920 m	MPC · JPL
246627	2008 WK_{89}	—	November 21, 2008	Mount Lemmon	Mount Lemmon Survey	·	2.6 km	MPC · JPL
246628	2008 WR_{91}	—	November 23, 2008	Mount Lemmon	Mount Lemmon Survey	·	1.5 km	MPC · JPL
246629	2008 WP_{94}	—	November 28, 2008	Pla D'Arguines	R. Ferrando	(5)	2.1 km	MPC · JPL
246630	2008 WU_{94}	—	November 24, 2008	Sierra Stars	Tozzi, F.	·	4.9 km	MPC · JPL
246631	2008 WU_{111}	—	November 30, 2008	Kitt Peak	Spacewatch	·	3.6 km	MPC · JPL
246632	2008 WU_{125}	—	November 20, 2008	Mount Lemmon	Mount Lemmon Survey	·	1.7 km	MPC · JPL
246633	2008 WL_{129}	—	November 20, 2008	Kitt Peak	Spacewatch	·	1.3 km	MPC · JPL
246634	2008 XR_{1}	—	December 2, 2008	Marly	P. Kocher	·	1.6 km	MPC · JPL
246635	2008 XP_{9}	—	December 1, 2008	Catalina	CSS	·	3.9 km	MPC · JPL
246636	2008 XS_{16}	—	December 1, 2008	Kitt Peak	Spacewatch	·	1.4 km	MPC · JPL
246637	2008 XF_{30}	—	December 1, 2008	Catalina	CSS	·	1.2 km	MPC · JPL
246638	2008 XO_{38}	—	December 2, 2008	Kitt Peak	Spacewatch	·	2.1 km	MPC · JPL
246639	2008 YJ_{1}	—	December 20, 2008	La Sagra	OAM	·	3.6 km	MPC · JPL
246640	2008 YR_{4}	—	December 22, 2008	Dauban	Kugel, F.	·	980 m	MPC · JPL
246641	2008 YU_{8}	—	December 22, 2008	Sandlot	G. Hug	·	3.9 km	MPC · JPL
246642	2008 YW_{8}	—	December 23, 2008	Piszkéstető	K. Sárneczky	MAR	1.4 km	MPC · JPL
246643 Miaoli	2008 YU_{9}	Miaoli	December 18, 2008	Lulin	Hsiao, X. Y., Q. Ye	·	3.8 km	MPC · JPL
246644	2008 YZ_{18}	—	December 21, 2008	Mount Lemmon	Mount Lemmon Survey	AST	2.9 km	MPC · JPL
246645	2008 YD_{19}	—	December 21, 2008	Mount Lemmon	Mount Lemmon Survey	·	2.4 km	MPC · JPL
246646	2008 YK_{19}	—	December 21, 2008	Mount Lemmon	Mount Lemmon Survey	·	980 m	MPC · JPL
246647	2008 YO_{19}	—	December 21, 2008	Mount Lemmon	Mount Lemmon Survey	·	3.2 km	MPC · JPL
246648	2008 YZ_{19}	—	December 21, 2008	Mount Lemmon	Mount Lemmon Survey	·	1.5 km	MPC · JPL
246649	2008 YN_{21}	—	December 21, 2008	Mount Lemmon	Mount Lemmon Survey	·	2.1 km	MPC · JPL
246650	2008 YG_{22}	—	December 21, 2008	Mount Lemmon	Mount Lemmon Survey	·	3.7 km	MPC · JPL
246651	2008 YS_{22}	—	December 21, 2008	Mount Lemmon	Mount Lemmon Survey	·	3.1 km	MPC · JPL
246652	2008 YU_{28}	—	December 29, 2008	Piszkéstető	K. Sárneczky	KOR	1.5 km	MPC · JPL
246653	2008 YM_{33}	—	December 28, 2008	Dauban	Kugel, F.	·	1.8 km	MPC · JPL
246654	2008 YN_{35}	—	December 22, 2008	Kitt Peak	Spacewatch	·	1.3 km	MPC · JPL
246655	2008 YE_{38}	—	December 29, 2008	Kitt Peak	Spacewatch	(5)	2.0 km	MPC · JPL
246656	2008 YA_{41}	—	December 30, 2008	Mount Lemmon	Mount Lemmon Survey	URS	6.0 km	MPC · JPL
246657	2008 YD_{45}	—	December 29, 2008	Mount Lemmon	Mount Lemmon Survey	·	1.9 km	MPC · JPL
246658	2008 YK_{47}	—	December 29, 2008	Kitt Peak	Spacewatch	·	3.0 km	MPC · JPL
246659	2008 YW_{49}	—	December 29, 2008	Mount Lemmon	Mount Lemmon Survey	·	2.3 km	MPC · JPL
246660	2008 YT_{58}	—	December 30, 2008	Kitt Peak	Spacewatch	·	2.8 km	MPC · JPL
246661	2008 YA_{85}	—	December 27, 2008	Bergisch Gladbach	W. Bickel	HOF	2.9 km	MPC · JPL
246662	2008 YV_{92}	—	December 29, 2008	Kitt Peak	Spacewatch	·	4.3 km	MPC · JPL
246663	2008 YP_{101}	—	December 29, 2008	Kitt Peak	Spacewatch	·	1.6 km	MPC · JPL
246664	2008 YW_{103}	—	December 29, 2008	Kitt Peak	Spacewatch	·	4.2 km	MPC · JPL
246665	2008 YH_{105}	—	December 29, 2008	Kitt Peak	Spacewatch	·	1.5 km	MPC · JPL
246666	2008 YP_{106}	—	December 29, 2008	Kitt Peak	Spacewatch	VER	3.1 km	MPC · JPL
246667	2008 YB_{109}	—	December 29, 2008	Kitt Peak	Spacewatch	·	3.2 km	MPC · JPL
246668	2008 YS_{117}	—	December 29, 2008	Kitt Peak	Spacewatch	·	1.6 km	MPC · JPL
246669	2008 YN_{126}	—	December 30, 2008	Kitt Peak	Spacewatch	AST	3.0 km	MPC · JPL
246670	2008 YY_{131}	—	December 31, 2008	Kitt Peak	Spacewatch	·	3.6 km	MPC · JPL
246671	2008 YT_{132}	—	December 31, 2008	Kitt Peak	Spacewatch	·	1.8 km	MPC · JPL
246672	2008 YZ_{132}	—	December 31, 2008	Kitt Peak	Spacewatch	·	3.3 km	MPC · JPL
246673	2008 YG_{137}	—	December 30, 2008	Kitt Peak	Spacewatch	EOS	4.0 km	MPC · JPL
246674	2008 YS_{138}	—	December 30, 2008	Mount Lemmon	Mount Lemmon Survey	·	2.0 km	MPC · JPL
246675	2008 YH_{141}	—	December 30, 2008	Mount Lemmon	Mount Lemmon Survey	·	2.0 km	MPC · JPL
246676	2008 YN_{151}	—	December 22, 2008	Kitt Peak	Spacewatch	·	5.6 km	MPC · JPL
246677	2008 YU_{151}	—	December 22, 2008	Mount Lemmon	Mount Lemmon Survey	KOR	1.6 km	MPC · JPL
246678	2008 YY_{152}	—	December 30, 2008	Mount Lemmon	Mount Lemmon Survey	·	1.4 km	MPC · JPL
246679	2008 YE_{159}	—	December 31, 2008	Mount Lemmon	Mount Lemmon Survey	HOF	3.6 km	MPC · JPL
246680	2008 YG_{159}	—	December 31, 2008	Mount Lemmon	Mount Lemmon Survey	·	2.6 km	MPC · JPL
246681	2008 YZ_{160}	—	December 29, 2008	Mount Lemmon	Mount Lemmon Survey	·	2.3 km	MPC · JPL
246682	2008 YK_{161}	—	December 21, 2008	Kitt Peak	Spacewatch	·	5.5 km	MPC · JPL
246683	2008 YW_{161}	—	December 31, 2008	Catalina	CSS	ARM	4.4 km	MPC · JPL
246684	2008 YJ_{162}	—	December 21, 2008	Mount Lemmon	Mount Lemmon Survey	·	2.1 km	MPC · JPL
246685	2008 YO_{162}	—	December 22, 2008	Kitt Peak	Spacewatch	·	3.2 km	MPC · JPL
246686	2008 YZ_{162}	—	December 29, 2008	Kitt Peak	Spacewatch	·	1.5 km	MPC · JPL
246687	2009 AD	—	January 1, 2009	Mayhill	Lowe, A.	MAS	1.1 km	MPC · JPL
246688	2009 AE	—	January 1, 2009	Mayhill	Lowe, A.	·	1.8 km	MPC · JPL
246689	2009 AH_{5}	—	January 1, 2009	Kitt Peak	Spacewatch	·	3.3 km	MPC · JPL
246690	2009 AD_{12}	—	January 2, 2009	Mount Lemmon	Mount Lemmon Survey	MAS	960 m	MPC · JPL
246691	2009 AA_{15}	—	January 2, 2009	Mount Lemmon	Mount Lemmon Survey	KOR	1.5 km	MPC · JPL
246692	2009 AG_{21}	—	January 3, 2009	Kitt Peak	Spacewatch	·	3.2 km	MPC · JPL
246693	2009 AL_{21}	—	January 3, 2009	Kitt Peak	Spacewatch	·	1.6 km	MPC · JPL
246694	2009 AM_{21}	—	January 3, 2009	Kitt Peak	Spacewatch	·	2.8 km	MPC · JPL
246695	2009 AG_{25}	—	January 2, 2009	Kitt Peak	Spacewatch	MRX	1.1 km	MPC · JPL
246696	2009 AN_{25}	—	January 2, 2009	Kitt Peak	Spacewatch	·	2.2 km	MPC · JPL
246697	2009 AC_{26}	—	January 2, 2009	Kitt Peak	Spacewatch	MAS	920 m	MPC · JPL
246698	2009 AS_{26}	—	January 2, 2009	Kitt Peak	Spacewatch	·	6.0 km	MPC · JPL
246699	2009 AH_{30}	—	January 15, 2009	Kitt Peak	Spacewatch	·	5.8 km	MPC · JPL
246700	2009 AM_{31}	—	January 15, 2009	Kitt Peak	Spacewatch	·	2.9 km	MPC · JPL

== 246701–246800 ==
back to top

Designation			Discovery			Properties		Ref
Permanent	Provisional	Named after	Date	Site	Discoverer(s)	Category	Diam.	Ref
246701	2009 AX_{31}	—	January 15, 2009	Kitt Peak	Spacewatch	·	940 m	MPC · JPL
246702	2009 AU_{32}	—	January 15, 2009	Kitt Peak	Spacewatch	EUP	3.8 km	MPC · JPL
246703	2009 AO_{33}	—	January 15, 2009	Kitt Peak	Spacewatch	(12739)	2.2 km	MPC · JPL
246704	2009 AY_{34}	—	January 15, 2009	Kitt Peak	Spacewatch	·	4.7 km	MPC · JPL
246705	2009 AN_{36}	—	January 15, 2009	Kitt Peak	Spacewatch	·	2.8 km	MPC · JPL
246706	2009 AQ_{48}	—	January 3, 2009	Mount Lemmon	Mount Lemmon Survey	·	5.2 km	MPC · JPL
246707	2009 BM_{4}	—	January 18, 2009	Socorro	LINEAR	·	1.8 km	MPC · JPL
246708	2009 BQ_{4}	—	January 18, 2009	Socorro	LINEAR	·	4.5 km	MPC · JPL
246709	2009 BR_{6}	—	January 18, 2009	Socorro	LINEAR	·	3.3 km	MPC · JPL
246710	2009 BO_{7}	—	January 18, 2009	Socorro	LINEAR	GEF	1.7 km	MPC · JPL
246711	2009 BJ_{8}	—	January 17, 2009	Socorro	LINEAR	·	4.7 km	MPC · JPL
246712	2009 BS_{10}	—	January 25, 2009	Mayhill	Lowe, A.	·	2.5 km	MPC · JPL
246713	2009 BZ_{11}	—	January 21, 2009	Socorro	LINEAR	·	1.7 km	MPC · JPL
246714	2009 BR_{12}	—	January 21, 2009	Socorro	LINEAR	·	1.9 km	MPC · JPL
246715	2009 BN_{16}	—	January 16, 2009	Kitt Peak	Spacewatch	·	1.6 km	MPC · JPL
246716	2009 BP_{16}	—	January 16, 2009	Kitt Peak	Spacewatch	HYG	3.4 km	MPC · JPL
246717	2009 BP_{17}	—	January 17, 2009	Mount Lemmon	Mount Lemmon Survey	·	3.6 km	MPC · JPL
246718	2009 BV_{18}	—	January 16, 2009	Mount Lemmon	Mount Lemmon Survey	·	3.2 km	MPC · JPL
246719	2009 BR_{19}	—	January 16, 2009	Mount Lemmon	Mount Lemmon Survey	·	910 m	MPC · JPL
246720	2009 BP_{21}	—	January 16, 2009	Mount Lemmon	Mount Lemmon Survey	·	2.8 km	MPC · JPL
246721	2009 BP_{24}	—	January 17, 2009	Catalina	CSS	NAE	4.1 km	MPC · JPL
246722	2009 BN_{35}	—	January 16, 2009	Kitt Peak	Spacewatch	·	5.7 km	MPC · JPL
246723	2009 BT_{44}	—	January 16, 2009	Kitt Peak	Spacewatch	(31811)	3.9 km	MPC · JPL
246724	2009 BZ_{45}	—	January 16, 2009	Kitt Peak	Spacewatch	·	5.1 km	MPC · JPL
246725	2009 BC_{47}	—	January 16, 2009	Kitt Peak	Spacewatch	·	3.6 km	MPC · JPL
246726	2009 BR_{48}	—	January 16, 2009	Kitt Peak	Spacewatch	3:2	8.1 km	MPC · JPL
246727	2009 BE_{50}	—	January 16, 2009	Mount Lemmon	Mount Lemmon Survey	·	1.9 km	MPC · JPL
246728	2009 BO_{52}	—	January 16, 2009	Kitt Peak	Spacewatch	·	2.9 km	MPC · JPL
246729	2009 BN_{56}	—	January 17, 2009	Kitt Peak	Spacewatch	·	2.0 km	MPC · JPL
246730	2009 BP_{56}	—	January 18, 2009	Kitt Peak	Spacewatch	(5)	1.6 km	MPC · JPL
246731	2009 BV_{56}	—	January 18, 2009	Kitt Peak	Spacewatch	EOS	2.6 km	MPC · JPL
246732	2009 BS_{61}	—	January 18, 2009	Kitt Peak	Spacewatch	·	1.1 km	MPC · JPL
246733	2009 BJ_{62}	—	January 18, 2009	Purple Mountain	PMO NEO Survey Program	·	5.5 km	MPC · JPL
246734	2009 BB_{63}	—	January 20, 2009	Kitt Peak	Spacewatch	·	2.0 km	MPC · JPL
246735	2009 BD_{63}	—	January 20, 2009	Kitt Peak	Spacewatch	·	1.7 km	MPC · JPL
246736	2009 BV_{64}	—	January 20, 2009	Mount Lemmon	Mount Lemmon Survey	·	1.7 km	MPC · JPL
246737	2009 BW_{67}	—	January 20, 2009	Kitt Peak	Spacewatch	·	2.1 km	MPC · JPL
246738	2009 BT_{70}	—	January 25, 2009	Catalina	CSS	THM	2.6 km	MPC · JPL
246739	2009 BH_{74}	—	January 17, 2009	Kitt Peak	Spacewatch	WIT	1.3 km	MPC · JPL
246740	2009 BB_{76}	—	January 25, 2009	Catalina	CSS	·	5.1 km	MPC · JPL
246741	2009 BF_{78}	—	January 29, 2009	Pla D'Arguines	R. Ferrando	·	2.3 km	MPC · JPL
246742	2009 BQ_{78}	—	January 30, 2009	Socorro	LINEAR	PHO	1.7 km	MPC · JPL
246743	2009 BT_{79}	—	January 30, 2009	Socorro	LINEAR	AEO	1.4 km	MPC · JPL
246744	2009 BS_{82}	—	January 20, 2009	Catalina	CSS	·	2.5 km	MPC · JPL
246745	2009 BA_{83}	—	January 20, 2009	Catalina	CSS	LIX	4.8 km	MPC · JPL
246746	2009 BY_{98}	—	January 26, 2009	Mount Lemmon	Mount Lemmon Survey	·	2.6 km	MPC · JPL
246747	2009 BJ_{115}	—	January 29, 2009	Kitt Peak	Spacewatch	T_{j} (2.98)	3.3 km	MPC · JPL
246748	2009 BZ_{124}	—	January 31, 2009	Kitt Peak	Spacewatch	·	2.0 km	MPC · JPL
246749	2009 BB_{129}	—	January 29, 2009	Mount Lemmon	Mount Lemmon Survey	·	5.3 km	MPC · JPL
246750	2009 BV_{133}	—	January 29, 2009	Kitt Peak	Spacewatch	(29841)	1.7 km	MPC · JPL
246751	2009 BL_{136}	—	January 29, 2009	Kitt Peak	Spacewatch	·	1.5 km	MPC · JPL
246752	2009 BK_{142}	—	January 30, 2009	Kitt Peak	Spacewatch	·	4.1 km	MPC · JPL
246753	2009 BJ_{149}	—	January 31, 2009	Kitt Peak	Spacewatch	·	1.4 km	MPC · JPL
246754	2009 BK_{152}	—	January 30, 2009	Kitt Peak	Spacewatch	·	3.4 km	MPC · JPL
246755	2009 BY_{153}	—	January 31, 2009	Kitt Peak	Spacewatch	·	1.1 km	MPC · JPL
246756	2009 BM_{160}	—	January 31, 2009	Mount Lemmon	Mount Lemmon Survey	VER	2.9 km	MPC · JPL
246757	2009 BM_{175}	—	January 29, 2009	Catalina	CSS	·	7.3 km	MPC · JPL
246758	2009 BF_{179}	—	January 25, 2009	Catalina	CSS	·	4.0 km	MPC · JPL
246759 Elviracheca	2009 CL_{4}	Elviracheca	February 11, 2009	Calar Alto	F. Hormuth	·	1.5 km	MPC · JPL
246760	2009 CY_{6}	—	February 1, 2009	Kitt Peak	Spacewatch	AGN	1.4 km	MPC · JPL
246761	2009 CT_{9}	—	February 1, 2009	Kitt Peak	Spacewatch	·	2.7 km	MPC · JPL
246762	2009 CT_{13}	—	February 2, 2009	Kitt Peak	Spacewatch	EOS	4.1 km	MPC · JPL
246763	2009 CL_{14}	—	February 1, 2009	Kitt Peak	Spacewatch	·	3.4 km	MPC · JPL
246764	2009 CD_{20}	—	February 1, 2009	Mount Lemmon	Mount Lemmon Survey	·	4.9 km	MPC · JPL
246765	2009 CS_{21}	—	February 1, 2009	Kitt Peak	Spacewatch	·	2.3 km	MPC · JPL
246766	2009 CY_{21}	—	February 1, 2009	Kitt Peak	Spacewatch	·	1.4 km	MPC · JPL
246767	2009 CB_{29}	—	February 1, 2009	Kitt Peak	Spacewatch	(5)	1.7 km	MPC · JPL
246768	2009 CO_{30}	—	February 1, 2009	Kitt Peak	Spacewatch	·	1.7 km	MPC · JPL
246769	2009 CA_{35}	—	February 2, 2009	Mount Lemmon	Mount Lemmon Survey	·	5.4 km	MPC · JPL
246770	2009 CJ_{46}	—	February 14, 2009	Kitt Peak	Spacewatch	·	1.1 km	MPC · JPL
246771	2009 CZ_{48}	—	February 14, 2009	Mount Lemmon	Mount Lemmon Survey	·	4.4 km	MPC · JPL
246772	2009 CU_{50}	—	February 14, 2009	La Sagra	OAM	·	3.1 km	MPC · JPL
246773	2009 CQ_{51}	—	February 14, 2009	La Sagra	OAM	·	1.5 km	MPC · JPL
246774	2009 CH_{57}	—	February 1, 2009	Mount Lemmon	Mount Lemmon Survey	HYG	4.2 km	MPC · JPL
246775	2009 DO_{6}	—	February 17, 2009	Kitt Peak	Spacewatch	·	2.5 km	MPC · JPL
246776	2009 DK_{11}	—	February 19, 2009	Dauban	Kugel, F.	EOS	2.6 km	MPC · JPL
246777	2009 DG_{16}	—	February 17, 2009	La Sagra	OAM	NEM	3.2 km	MPC · JPL
246778	2009 DK_{16}	—	February 17, 2009	La Sagra	OAM	ULA · CYB	5.7 km	MPC · JPL
246779	2009 DB_{20}	—	February 16, 2009	Catalina	CSS	·	4.0 km	MPC · JPL
246780	2009 DK_{43}	—	February 25, 2009	Dauban	Kugel, F.	·	3.9 km	MPC · JPL
246781	2009 DH_{49}	—	February 19, 2009	Kitt Peak	Spacewatch	·	2.0 km	MPC · JPL
246782	2009 DT_{51}	—	February 22, 2009	Kitt Peak	Spacewatch	CYB	4.5 km	MPC · JPL
246783	2009 DN_{53}	—	February 22, 2009	Kitt Peak	Spacewatch	NAE	2.9 km	MPC · JPL
246784	2009 DA_{56}	—	February 22, 2009	Kitt Peak	Spacewatch	·	3.4 km	MPC · JPL
246785	2009 DC_{74}	—	February 26, 2009	Catalina	CSS	·	1.8 km	MPC · JPL
246786	2009 DV_{77}	—	February 24, 2009	La Sagra	OAM	3:2	6.0 km	MPC · JPL
246787	2009 DT_{83}	—	February 24, 2009	Kitt Peak	Spacewatch	·	1.8 km	MPC · JPL
246788	2009 DC_{87}	—	February 27, 2009	Kitt Peak	Spacewatch	·	4.4 km	MPC · JPL
246789 Pattinson	2009 DM_{89}	Pattinson	February 24, 2009	Zelenchukskaya Stn	T. V. Krjačko	·	1.8 km	MPC · JPL
246790	2009 DS_{90}	—	February 26, 2009	Catalina	CSS	·	2.2 km	MPC · JPL
246791	2009 DF_{99}	—	February 26, 2009	Kitt Peak	Spacewatch	·	2.2 km	MPC · JPL
246792	2009 DD_{106}	—	February 27, 2009	Catalina	CSS	·	3.0 km	MPC · JPL
246793	2009 DH_{110}	—	February 19, 2009	Catalina	CSS	·	1.3 km	MPC · JPL
246794	2009 DP_{128}	—	February 24, 2009	Catalina	CSS	·	4.0 km	MPC · JPL
246795	2009 EX_{4}	—	March 15, 2009	La Sagra	OAM	·	3.8 km	MPC · JPL
246796	2009 EP_{8}	—	March 2, 2009	Mount Lemmon	Mount Lemmon Survey	AGN	1.5 km	MPC · JPL
246797	2009 EP_{9}	—	March 1, 2009	Kitt Peak	Spacewatch	·	1.7 km	MPC · JPL
246798	2009 EB_{12}	—	March 2, 2009	Kitt Peak	Spacewatch	·	5.9 km	MPC · JPL
246799	2009 EA_{15}	—	March 15, 2009	Kitt Peak	Spacewatch	·	3.1 km	MPC · JPL
246800	2009 EX_{15}	—	March 15, 2009	Kitt Peak	Spacewatch	·	2.4 km	MPC · JPL

== 246801–246900 ==
back to top

Designation			Discovery			Properties		Ref
Permanent	Provisional	Named after	Date	Site	Discoverer(s)	Category	Diam.	Ref
246801	2009 ER_{22}	—	March 3, 2009	Kitt Peak	Spacewatch	·	4.5 km	MPC · JPL
246802	2009 EN_{26}	—	March 15, 2009	Kitt Peak	Spacewatch	·	2.2 km	MPC · JPL
246803 Martinezpatrick	2009 FB_{1}	Martinezpatrick	March 17, 2009	Vicques	M. Ory	·	7.4 km	MPC · JPL
246804	2009 FJ_{7}	—	March 16, 2009	Kitt Peak	Spacewatch	·	2.3 km	MPC · JPL
246805	2009 FH_{9}	—	March 16, 2009	Mount Lemmon	Mount Lemmon Survey	VER	3.1 km	MPC · JPL
246806	2009 FX_{25}	—	March 18, 2009	Mount Lemmon	Mount Lemmon Survey	·	5.1 km	MPC · JPL
246807	2009 FE_{31}	—	March 24, 2009	La Sagra	OAM	·	2.5 km	MPC · JPL
246808	2009 FC_{44}	—	March 29, 2009	Bergisch Gladbach	W. Bickel	·	3.5 km	MPC · JPL
246809	2009 FP_{66}	—	March 21, 2009	Mount Lemmon	Mount Lemmon Survey	·	1.9 km	MPC · JPL
246810	2009 FH_{73}	—	March 23, 2009	Calar Alto	F. Hormuth	·	2.7 km	MPC · JPL
246811	2009 GJ_{3}	—	April 15, 2009	Siding Spring	SSS	·	3.0 km	MPC · JPL
246812	2009 HD_{60}	—	April 24, 2009	Kitt Peak	Spacewatch	·	3.8 km	MPC · JPL
246813	2009 HD_{76}	—	April 24, 2009	Mount Lemmon	Mount Lemmon Survey	·	1.9 km	MPC · JPL
246814	2009 HE_{77}	—	April 28, 2009	Catalina	CSS	·	4.1 km	MPC · JPL
246815	2009 HG_{82}	—	April 26, 2009	Socorro	LINEAR	EUN	2.5 km	MPC · JPL
246816	2009 HP_{98}	—	April 23, 2009	La Sagra	OAM	EOS	2.6 km	MPC · JPL
246817	2009 KH_{1}	—	May 17, 2009	La Sagra	OAM	L5 · (17492)	10 km	MPC · JPL
246818	2009 KA_{2}	—	May 17, 2009	La Sagra	OAM	·	2.5 km	MPC · JPL
246819	2009 LO_{2}	—	June 14, 2009	Mount Lemmon	Mount Lemmon Survey	ARM	5.1 km	MPC · JPL
246820	2009 MP	—	June 17, 2009	Mayhill	Lowe, A.	·	5.9 km	MPC · JPL
246821 Satyarthi	2009 QW_{33}	Satyarthi	August 27, 2009	Vallemare Borbona	V. S. Casulli	HYG	3.5 km	MPC · JPL
246822	2009 ST_{53}	—	September 17, 2009	Catalina	CSS	V	800 m	MPC · JPL
246823	2009 TO_{35}	—	October 14, 2009	La Sagra	OAM	EOS	3.9 km	MPC · JPL
246824	2009 TR_{41}	—	October 15, 2009	La Sagra	OAM	·	4.9 km	MPC · JPL
246825	2009 TK_{43}	—	October 14, 2009	Mount Lemmon	Mount Lemmon Survey	·	6.2 km	MPC · JPL
246826	2009 TX_{45}	—	October 12, 2009	Mount Lemmon	Mount Lemmon Survey	·	3.4 km	MPC · JPL
246827	2009 TT_{46}	—	October 12, 2009	La Sagra	OAM	·	2.5 km	MPC · JPL
246828	2009 UF_{5}	—	October 18, 2009	Črni Vrh	Mikuž, H.	·	6.1 km	MPC · JPL
246829	2009 UF_{71}	—	October 22, 2009	Mount Lemmon	Mount Lemmon Survey	THM	3.2 km	MPC · JPL
246830	2009 UZ_{71}	—	October 23, 2009	Kitt Peak	Spacewatch	·	1.4 km	MPC · JPL
246831	2009 UK_{81}	—	October 22, 2009	Mount Lemmon	Mount Lemmon Survey	L4	12 km	MPC · JPL
246832	2009 UV_{135}	—	October 24, 2009	Catalina	CSS	·	4.4 km	MPC · JPL
246833	2009 UD_{136}	—	October 24, 2009	Catalina	CSS	L4	14 km	MPC · JPL
246834	2009 WJ_{10}	—	November 19, 2009	Socorro	LINEAR	TIR	4.1 km	MPC · JPL
246835	2009 WA_{204}	—	November 16, 2009	Kitt Peak	Spacewatch	·	3.6 km	MPC · JPL
246836	2009 WH_{212}	—	November 18, 2009	Kitt Peak	Spacewatch	·	3.3 km	MPC · JPL
246837 Bethfabinsky	2010 CR_{51}	Bethfabinsky	February 13, 2010	WISE	WISE	·	5.3 km	MPC · JPL
246838	2010 CN_{144}	—	February 13, 2010	Catalina	CSS	·	2.2 km	MPC · JPL
246839	2010 CE_{148}	—	February 14, 2010	Mount Lemmon	Mount Lemmon Survey	·	3.5 km	MPC · JPL
246840	2010 DW_{45}	—	February 17, 2010	Kitt Peak	Spacewatch	CYB	5.0 km	MPC · JPL
246841 Williamirace	2010 DR_{58}	Williamirace	February 24, 2010	WISE	WISE	·	2.2 km	MPC · JPL
246842 Dutchstapelbroek	2010 EZ_{5}	Dutchstapelbroek	March 2, 2010	WISE	WISE	·	3.7 km	MPC · JPL
246843	2010 EE_{31}	—	March 4, 2010	Kitt Peak	Spacewatch	·	2.7 km	MPC · JPL
246844	2010 EM_{73}	—	March 13, 2010	Catalina	CSS	·	4.0 km	MPC · JPL
246845	2010 EE_{121}	—	March 14, 2010	Catalina	CSS	·	2.3 km	MPC · JPL
246846	2010 EY_{126}	—	March 15, 2010	Catalina	CSS	EOS ·	5.5 km	MPC · JPL
246847	2010 EO_{139}	—	March 13, 2010	Catalina	CSS	·	1.3 km	MPC · JPL
246848	2010 EL_{140}	—	March 12, 2010	Kitt Peak	Spacewatch	·	3.0 km	MPC · JPL
246849	2010 FB_{48}	—	March 22, 2010	ESA OGS	ESA OGS	THM	3.5 km	MPC · JPL
246850	2010 FP_{55}	—	March 25, 2010	Kitt Peak	Spacewatch	HOF	3.8 km	MPC · JPL
246851	2010 GV_{24}	—	April 7, 2010	La Sagra	OAM	NAE	5.0 km	MPC · JPL
246852	2010 GM_{27}	—	April 5, 2010	Mount Lemmon	Mount Lemmon Survey	AST	3.6 km	MPC · JPL
246853	2010 GU_{30}	—	April 4, 2010	Catalina	CSS	·	1.5 km	MPC · JPL
246854	2010 GL_{97}	—	April 7, 2010	Kitt Peak	Spacewatch	·	3.1 km	MPC · JPL
246855	2010 GY_{116}	—	April 10, 2010	Mount Lemmon	Mount Lemmon Survey	THM	3.0 km	MPC · JPL
246856	2010 GC_{117}	—	April 10, 2010	Mount Lemmon	Mount Lemmon Survey	(13314)	3.4 km	MPC · JPL
246857	2010 HU_{77}	—	April 20, 2010	Kitt Peak	Spacewatch	·	2.5 km	MPC · JPL
246858	2010 HX_{78}	—	April 25, 2010	Nogales	Tenagra II	·	2.6 km	MPC · JPL
246859	2010 JZ_{115}	—	May 5, 2010	Nogales	Tenagra II	·	980 m	MPC · JPL
246860	2010 JK_{155}	—	May 9, 2010	Mount Lemmon	Mount Lemmon Survey	·	1.7 km	MPC · JPL
246861 Johnelwell	2010 KC_{18}	Johnelwell	May 17, 2010	WISE	WISE	·	2.1 km	MPC · JPL
246862	2655 P-L	—	September 24, 1960	Palomar	C. J. van Houten, I. van Houten-Groeneveld, T. Gehrels	·	6.5 km	MPC · JPL
246863	2697 P-L	—	September 24, 1960	Palomar	C. J. van Houten, I. van Houten-Groeneveld, T. Gehrels	·	1.3 km	MPC · JPL
246864	6379 P-L	—	September 24, 1960	Palomar	C. J. van Houten, I. van Houten-Groeneveld, T. Gehrels	NYS	1.6 km	MPC · JPL
246865	6770 P-L	—	September 24, 1960	Palomar	C. J. van Houten, I. van Houten-Groeneveld, T. Gehrels	·	1.6 km	MPC · JPL
246866	1356 T-2	—	September 29, 1973	Palomar	C. J. van Houten, I. van Houten-Groeneveld, T. Gehrels	fast	2.3 km	MPC · JPL
246867	2057 T-2	—	September 29, 1973	Palomar	C. J. van Houten, I. van Houten-Groeneveld, T. Gehrels	NYS	1.7 km	MPC · JPL
246868	1366 T-3	—	October 17, 1977	Palomar	C. J. van Houten, I. van Houten-Groeneveld, T. Gehrels	·	5.4 km	MPC · JPL
246869	4583 T-3	—	October 16, 1977	Palomar	C. J. van Houten, I. van Houten-Groeneveld, T. Gehrels	EOS	3.4 km	MPC · JPL
246870	1993 RX_{14}	—	September 15, 1993	La Silla	E. W. Elst	MIS	1.9 km	MPC · JPL
246871	1993 TL_{14}	—	October 9, 1993	La Silla	E. W. Elst	·	2.0 km	MPC · JPL
246872	1993 TK_{23}	—	October 9, 1993	La Silla	E. W. Elst	·	4.1 km	MPC · JPL
246873	1994 PQ_{7}	—	August 10, 1994	La Silla	E. W. Elst	·	2.6 km	MPC · JPL
246874	1994 UE_{7}	—	October 28, 1994	Kitt Peak	Spacewatch	·	4.0 km	MPC · JPL
246875	1994 WR_{6}	—	November 28, 1994	Kitt Peak	Spacewatch	·	6.3 km	MPC · JPL
246876	1994 XH_{2}	—	December 1, 1994	Kitt Peak	Spacewatch	·	2.9 km	MPC · JPL
246877	1995 DZ_{2}	—	February 24, 1995	Siding Spring	R. H. McNaught	PHO	1.6 km	MPC · JPL
246878	1995 OY_{5}	—	July 22, 1995	Kitt Peak	Spacewatch	·	3.3 km	MPC · JPL
246879	1995 SB_{19}	—	September 18, 1995	Kitt Peak	Spacewatch	ADE	3.4 km	MPC · JPL
246880	1995 SR_{54}	—	September 17, 1995	Xinglong	SCAP	·	1.5 km	MPC · JPL
246881	1995 TZ_{2}	—	October 15, 1995	Kitt Peak	Spacewatch	EOS	3.2 km	MPC · JPL
246882	1996 BB_{11}	—	January 24, 1996	Kitt Peak	Spacewatch	·	3.2 km	MPC · JPL
246883	1996 BF_{12}	—	January 24, 1996	Kitt Peak	Spacewatch	·	2.3 km	MPC · JPL
246884	1996 EJ_{15}	—	March 12, 1996	Kitt Peak	Spacewatch	·	5.9 km	MPC · JPL
246885	1996 GV_{8}	—	April 13, 1996	Kitt Peak	Spacewatch	·	4.4 km	MPC · JPL
246886	1996 XY_{4}	—	December 6, 1996	Kitt Peak	Spacewatch	·	2.9 km	MPC · JPL
246887	1996 XK_{28}	—	December 12, 1996	Kitt Peak	Spacewatch	KOR	1.8 km	MPC · JPL
246888	1997 CE_{14}	—	February 3, 1997	Kitt Peak	Spacewatch	·	6.1 km	MPC · JPL
246889	1997 EB_{7}	—	March 3, 1997	Kitt Peak	Spacewatch	·	3.9 km	MPC · JPL
246890	1997 EF_{15}	—	March 4, 1997	Kitt Peak	Spacewatch	·	6.0 km	MPC · JPL
246891	1997 JY_{10}	—	May 8, 1997	Kitt Peak	Spacewatch	L5	10 km	MPC · JPL
246892	1997 NU_{5}	—	July 7, 1997	Kitt Peak	Spacewatch	·	3.2 km	MPC · JPL
246893	1997 OB_{1}	—	July 29, 1997	San Marcello	A. Boattini, L. Tesi	·	940 m	MPC · JPL
246894	1997 SM_{6}	—	September 23, 1997	Kitt Peak	Spacewatch	·	2.9 km	MPC · JPL
246895	1997 SP_{8}	—	September 23, 1997	Kitt Peak	Spacewatch	·	2.4 km	MPC · JPL
246896	1997 SV_{9}	—	September 28, 1997	Kitt Peak	Spacewatch	PAD	3.3 km	MPC · JPL
246897	1997 SH_{15}	—	September 28, 1997	Kitt Peak	Spacewatch	·	900 m	MPC · JPL
246898	1997 SB_{31}	—	September 27, 1997	Kitt Peak	Spacewatch	·	2.5 km	MPC · JPL
246899	1997 TB_{5}	—	October 1, 1997	Caussols	ODAS	ADE	4.3 km	MPC · JPL
246900	1997 WB_{18}	—	November 23, 1997	Kitt Peak	Spacewatch	·	4.3 km	MPC · JPL

== 246901–247000 ==
back to top

Designation			Discovery			Properties		Ref
Permanent	Provisional	Named after	Date	Site	Discoverer(s)	Category	Diam.	Ref
246901	1997 WW_{55}	—	November 28, 1997	Kitt Peak	Spacewatch	LIX	6.6 km	MPC · JPL
246902	1998 DT_{19}	—	February 26, 1998	Kitt Peak	Spacewatch	·	4.9 km	MPC · JPL
246903	1998 DA_{22}	—	February 22, 1998	Kitt Peak	Spacewatch	·	4.3 km	MPC · JPL
246904	1998 FD_{10}	—	March 24, 1998	Caussols	ODAS	·	3.2 km	MPC · JPL
246905	1998 FH_{20}	—	March 20, 1998	Socorro	LINEAR	PHO	2.3 km	MPC · JPL
246906	1998 HL_{10}	—	April 17, 1998	Kitt Peak	Spacewatch	·	5.6 km	MPC · JPL
246907	1998 KC_{3}	—	May 23, 1998	Kitt Peak	Spacewatch	·	3.6 km	MPC · JPL
246908	1998 MU_{1}	—	June 16, 1998	Kitt Peak	Spacewatch	·	3.1 km	MPC · JPL
246909	1998 QV_{4}	—	August 22, 1998	Xinglong	SCAP	·	3.2 km	MPC · JPL
246910	1998 QZ_{5}	—	August 24, 1998	Caussols	ODAS	·	1.7 km	MPC · JPL
246911	1998 QY_{96}	—	August 19, 1998	Socorro	LINEAR	·	3.1 km	MPC · JPL
246912	1998 RB_{41}	—	September 14, 1998	Socorro	LINEAR	·	1.7 km	MPC · JPL
246913 Slocum	1998 SU_{63}	Slocum	September 23, 1998	Dominion	G. C. L. Aikman	·	1.6 km	MPC · JPL
246914	1998 SZ_{124}	—	September 26, 1998	Socorro	LINEAR	·	1.1 km	MPC · JPL
246915	1998 UK_{5}	—	October 22, 1998	Caussols	ODAS	·	1.4 km	MPC · JPL
246916	1998 UZ_{5}	—	October 22, 1998	Caussols	ODAS	·	6.0 km	MPC · JPL
246917	1998 UR_{18}	—	October 25, 1998	Oizumi	T. Kobayashi	·	2.0 km	MPC · JPL
246918	1998 UN_{27}	—	October 18, 1998	La Silla	E. W. Elst	·	5.2 km	MPC · JPL
246919	1998 UB_{42}	—	October 28, 1998	Socorro	LINEAR	·	1.2 km	MPC · JPL
246920	1998 WY_{3}	—	November 18, 1998	Socorro	LINEAR	·	3.6 km	MPC · JPL
246921	1998 WT_{10}	—	November 21, 1998	Socorro	LINEAR	·	2.5 km	MPC · JPL
246922	1998 WR_{34}	—	November 17, 1998	Kitt Peak	Spacewatch	·	4.9 km	MPC · JPL
246923	1998 XW_{11}	—	December 15, 1998	Socorro	LINEAR	·	1.8 km	MPC · JPL
246924	1999 AJ_{1}	—	January 7, 1999	Kitt Peak	Spacewatch	·	1.7 km	MPC · JPL
246925	1999 BG_{3}	—	January 19, 1999	Catalina	CSS	EUP	4.9 km	MPC · JPL
246926	1999 BO_{11}	—	January 20, 1999	Caussols	ODAS	·	2.6 km	MPC · JPL
246927	1999 BF_{32}	—	January 19, 1999	Kitt Peak	Spacewatch	THM	2.8 km	MPC · JPL
246928	1999 CV_{2}	—	February 9, 1999	Ondřejov	L. Kotková	·	3.2 km	MPC · JPL
246929	1999 CW_{129}	—	February 6, 1999	Mauna Kea	Veillet, C.	·	2.8 km	MPC · JPL
246930	1999 ET_{14}	—	March 14, 1999	Kitt Peak	Spacewatch	VER	4.4 km	MPC · JPL
246931	1999 HE_{7}	—	April 19, 1999	Kitt Peak	Spacewatch	AST	3.5 km	MPC · JPL
246932	1999 JR_{5}	—	May 10, 1999	Socorro	LINEAR	PHO	1.6 km	MPC · JPL
246933	1999 LN_{5}	—	June 11, 1999	Socorro	LINEAR	PHO	1.3 km	MPC · JPL
246934	1999 PL	—	August 6, 1999	Monte Agliale	Santangelo, M. M. M.	·	5.3 km	MPC · JPL
246935	1999 RB_{8}	—	September 3, 1999	Kitt Peak	Spacewatch	·	2.3 km	MPC · JPL
246936	1999 RT_{13}	—	September 7, 1999	Socorro	LINEAR	EUP	6.6 km	MPC · JPL
246937	1999 RF_{15}	—	September 7, 1999	Socorro	LINEAR	·	2.7 km	MPC · JPL
246938	1999 RU_{17}	—	September 7, 1999	Socorro	LINEAR	·	1.6 km	MPC · JPL
246939	1999 RX_{30}	—	September 8, 1999	Socorro	LINEAR	H	940 m	MPC · JPL
246940	1999 RK_{51}	—	September 7, 1999	Socorro	LINEAR	NYS	1.1 km	MPC · JPL
246941	1999 RF_{100}	—	September 8, 1999	Socorro	LINEAR	T_{j} (2.98)	7.6 km	MPC · JPL
246942	1999 RV_{101}	—	September 8, 1999	Socorro	LINEAR	·	1.4 km	MPC · JPL
246943	1999 RF_{106}	—	September 8, 1999	Socorro	LINEAR	V	1.1 km	MPC · JPL
246944	1999 RD_{109}	—	September 8, 1999	Socorro	LINEAR	·	4.4 km	MPC · JPL
246945	1999 RP_{116}	—	September 9, 1999	Socorro	LINEAR	·	5.6 km	MPC · JPL
246946	1999 RC_{133}	—	September 9, 1999	Socorro	LINEAR	THB	5.0 km	MPC · JPL
246947	1999 RW_{141}	—	September 9, 1999	Socorro	LINEAR	·	3.2 km	MPC · JPL
246948	1999 RB_{142}	—	September 9, 1999	Socorro	LINEAR	·	1.5 km	MPC · JPL
246949	1999 RE_{149}	—	September 9, 1999	Socorro	LINEAR	·	1.6 km	MPC · JPL
246950	1999 RY_{185}	—	September 9, 1999	Socorro	LINEAR	·	1.7 km	MPC · JPL
246951	1999 RL_{191}	—	September 14, 1999	Kitt Peak	Spacewatch	CYB	7.0 km	MPC · JPL
246952	1999 RC_{201}	—	September 8, 1999	Socorro	LINEAR	PHO	1.6 km	MPC · JPL
246953	1999 RU_{201}	—	September 8, 1999	Socorro	LINEAR	·	4.9 km	MPC · JPL
246954	1999 RH_{209}	—	September 8, 1999	Socorro	LINEAR	·	5.0 km	MPC · JPL
246955	1999 RV_{219}	—	September 4, 1999	Catalina	CSS	V	1.1 km	MPC · JPL
246956	1999 RA_{242}	—	September 14, 1999	Socorro	LINEAR	·	1.7 km	MPC · JPL
246957	1999 SA_{4}	—	September 29, 1999	Višnjan	K. Korlević	·	3.9 km	MPC · JPL
246958	1999 SG_{21}	—	September 30, 1999	Kitt Peak	Spacewatch	·	5.1 km	MPC · JPL
246959	1999 TV_{3}	—	October 2, 1999	Ondřejov	L. Kotková	·	1.4 km	MPC · JPL
246960	1999 TS_{20}	—	October 7, 1999	Goodricke-Pigott	R. A. Tucker	EOS	3.9 km	MPC · JPL
246961	1999 TT_{38}	—	October 1, 1999	Catalina	CSS	·	6.0 km	MPC · JPL
246962	1999 TS_{39}	—	October 3, 1999	Catalina	CSS	·	2.9 km	MPC · JPL
246963	1999 TG_{45}	—	October 3, 1999	Kitt Peak	Spacewatch	NYS	1.5 km	MPC · JPL
246964	1999 TG_{61}	—	October 7, 1999	Kitt Peak	Spacewatch	·	2.4 km	MPC · JPL
246965	1999 TS_{70}	—	October 9, 1999	Kitt Peak	Spacewatch	CYB	6.0 km	MPC · JPL
246966	1999 TX_{79}	—	October 11, 1999	Kitt Peak	Spacewatch	MAS	860 m	MPC · JPL
246967	1999 TY_{106}	—	October 4, 1999	Socorro	LINEAR	·	4.8 km	MPC · JPL
246968	1999 TU_{125}	—	October 4, 1999	Socorro	LINEAR	·	1.9 km	MPC · JPL
246969	1999 TV_{135}	—	October 6, 1999	Socorro	LINEAR	EOS	3.2 km	MPC · JPL
246970	1999 TX_{138}	—	October 6, 1999	Socorro	LINEAR	NYS	1.7 km	MPC · JPL
246971	1999 TB_{149}	—	October 7, 1999	Socorro	LINEAR	·	4.3 km	MPC · JPL
246972	1999 TU_{150}	—	October 7, 1999	Socorro	LINEAR	·	1.8 km	MPC · JPL
246973	1999 TA_{155}	—	October 7, 1999	Socorro	LINEAR	NYS	1.4 km	MPC · JPL
246974	1999 TW_{155}	—	October 7, 1999	Socorro	LINEAR	·	3.1 km	MPC · JPL
246975	1999 TO_{170}	—	October 10, 1999	Socorro	LINEAR	·	1.7 km	MPC · JPL
246976	1999 TY_{190}	—	October 12, 1999	Socorro	LINEAR	·	1.3 km	MPC · JPL
246977	1999 TO_{220}	—	October 1, 1999	Catalina	CSS	·	5.3 km	MPC · JPL
246978	1999 TB_{221}	—	October 2, 1999	Catalina	CSS	·	2.7 km	MPC · JPL
246979	1999 TA_{230}	—	October 3, 1999	Socorro	LINEAR	·	4.3 km	MPC · JPL
246980	1999 TQ_{246}	—	October 6, 1999	Socorro	LINEAR	·	4.1 km	MPC · JPL
246981	1999 TG_{247}	—	October 6, 1999	Kitt Peak	Spacewatch	TIR	2.3 km	MPC · JPL
246982	1999 TM_{254}	—	October 8, 1999	Socorro	LINEAR	LIX	6.4 km	MPC · JPL
246983	1999 TW_{254}	—	October 13, 1999	Socorro	LINEAR	·	2.6 km	MPC · JPL
246984	1999 TM_{269}	—	October 3, 1999	Socorro	LINEAR	·	2.0 km	MPC · JPL
246985	1999 TZ_{270}	—	October 3, 1999	Socorro	LINEAR	·	2.3 km	MPC · JPL
246986	1999 TL_{274}	—	October 6, 1999	Socorro	LINEAR	·	5.2 km	MPC · JPL
246987	1999 TW_{291}	—	October 10, 1999	Socorro	LINEAR	EUP	7.8 km	MPC · JPL
246988	1999 TA_{307}	—	October 3, 1999	Kitt Peak	Spacewatch	·	3.9 km	MPC · JPL
246989	1999 TP_{320}	—	October 10, 1999	Socorro	LINEAR	·	2.1 km	MPC · JPL
246990	1999 UO_{27}	—	October 30, 1999	Kitt Peak	Spacewatch	·	4.2 km	MPC · JPL
246991	1999 UY_{40}	—	October 16, 1999	Socorro	LINEAR	·	5.1 km	MPC · JPL
246992	1999 UT_{41}	—	October 18, 1999	Socorro	LINEAR	T_{j} (2.98)	6.9 km	MPC · JPL
246993	1999 US_{52}	—	October 31, 1999	Catalina	CSS	·	1.7 km	MPC · JPL
246994	1999 UF_{53}	—	October 20, 1999	Socorro	LINEAR	·	2.1 km	MPC · JPL
246995	1999 UU_{58}	—	October 29, 1999	Anderson Mesa	LONEOS	·	1.8 km	MPC · JPL
246996	1999 UQ_{60}	—	October 31, 1999	Socorro	LINEAR	T_{j} (2.97)	4.8 km	MPC · JPL
246997	1999 VG_{9}	—	November 8, 1999	Višnjan	K. Korlević	LIX	6.9 km	MPC · JPL
246998	1999 VG_{16}	—	November 2, 1999	Kitt Peak	Spacewatch	·	2.1 km	MPC · JPL
246999	1999 VN_{41}	—	November 4, 1999	Kitt Peak	Spacewatch	·	3.5 km	MPC · JPL
247000	1999 VZ_{43}	—	November 3, 1999	Catalina	CSS	NYS	1.6 km	MPC · JPL

back to top

== See also ==
- Meanings of minor-planet names: 246001–247000
