= List of minor planets: 247001–248000 =

The following is a partial list of minor planets, running from minor-planet number 247001 through 248000, inclusive. The primary data for this and other partial lists is based on JPL's "Small-Body Orbital Elements" and data available from the Minor Planet Center. Critical list information is also provided by the MPC, unless otherwise specified from Lowell Observatory. A detailed description of the table's columns and additional sources are given on the main page including a complete list of every page in this series, and a statistical break-up on the dynamical classification of minor planets.

Also see the summary list of all named bodies in numerical and alphabetical order, and the corresponding naming citations for the number range of this particular list. New namings may only be added to this list after official publication, as the preannouncement of names is condemned by the Working Group for Small Bodies Nomenclature of the International Astronomical Union.

Near-Earth obj.	MBA (inner)	MBA (outer)	Centaur
Mars-crosser	MBA (middle)	Jupiter trojan	Trans-Neptunian obj.
Unclassified

== 247001–247100 ==
Designation			Discovery			Properties		Ref
Permanent	Provisional	Named after	Date	Site	Discoverer(s)	Category	Diam.	Ref
247001	1999 VL_{60}	—	November 4, 1999	Socorro	LINEAR	DOR	2.4 km	MPC · JPL
247002	1999 VF_{64}	—	November 4, 1999	Socorro	LINEAR	(58892)	5.8 km	MPC · JPL
247003	1999 VJ_{79}	—	November 4, 1999	Socorro	LINEAR	·	3.2 km	MPC · JPL
247004	1999 VF_{106}	—	November 9, 1999	Socorro	LINEAR	MAS	1.1 km	MPC · JPL
247005	1999 VQ_{120}	—	November 4, 1999	Kitt Peak	Spacewatch	·	2.2 km	MPC · JPL
247006	1999 VK_{127}	—	November 9, 1999	Kitt Peak	Spacewatch	·	2.2 km	MPC · JPL
247007	1999 VG_{144}	—	November 11, 1999	Catalina	CSS	EOS	4.0 km	MPC · JPL
247008	1999 VY_{147}	—	November 14, 1999	Socorro	LINEAR	·	5.1 km	MPC · JPL
247009	1999 VG_{154}	—	November 12, 1999	Kitt Peak	Spacewatch	·	3.0 km	MPC · JPL
247010	1999 VM_{178}	—	November 6, 1999	Socorro	LINEAR	·	5.1 km	MPC · JPL
247011	1999 VU_{191}	—	November 9, 1999	Socorro	LINEAR	·	1.7 km	MPC · JPL
247012	1999 VL_{192}	—	November 1, 1999	Anderson Mesa	LONEOS	V	1.2 km	MPC · JPL
247013	1999 VU_{197}	—	November 3, 1999	Catalina	CSS	·	2.1 km	MPC · JPL
247014	1999 VH_{201}	—	November 3, 1999	Socorro	LINEAR	·	6.0 km	MPC · JPL
247015	1999 VG_{218}	—	November 5, 1999	Socorro	LINEAR	·	5.9 km	MPC · JPL
247016	1999 WE_{12}	—	November 28, 1999	Kitt Peak	Spacewatch	EOS	2.6 km	MPC · JPL
247017	1999 XQ_{9}	—	December 2, 1999	Kitt Peak	Spacewatch	·	2.0 km	MPC · JPL
247018	1999 XE_{48}	—	December 7, 1999	Socorro	LINEAR	(6355)	6.3 km	MPC · JPL
247019	1999 XJ_{55}	—	December 7, 1999	Socorro	LINEAR	L4	20 km	MPC · JPL
247020	1999 XM_{108}	—	December 4, 1999	Catalina	CSS	·	5.3 km	MPC · JPL
247021	1999 XH_{199}	—	December 12, 1999	Socorro	LINEAR	BRA	2.9 km	MPC · JPL
247022	1999 XW_{200}	—	December 12, 1999	Socorro	LINEAR	·	7.2 km	MPC · JPL
247023	1999 XG_{238}	—	December 2, 1999	Kitt Peak	Spacewatch	NYS	1.6 km	MPC · JPL
247024	1999 XR_{255}	—	December 4, 1999	Kitt Peak	Spacewatch	·	3.6 km	MPC · JPL
247025	1999 YL_{7}	—	December 27, 1999	Kitt Peak	Spacewatch	·	3.0 km	MPC · JPL
247026	1999 YX_{16}	—	December 31, 1999	Kitt Peak	Spacewatch	·	3.4 km	MPC · JPL
247027	2000 AV_{25}	—	January 3, 2000	Socorro	LINEAR	·	5.3 km	MPC · JPL
247028	2000 AZ_{70}	—	January 5, 2000	Socorro	LINEAR	·	5.0 km	MPC · JPL
247029	2000 AX_{92}	—	January 3, 2000	Socorro	LINEAR	H	820 m	MPC · JPL
247030	2000 AS_{140}	—	January 5, 2000	Socorro	LINEAR	·	2.5 km	MPC · JPL
247031	2000 AW_{214}	—	January 7, 2000	Kitt Peak	Spacewatch	THM	3.6 km	MPC · JPL
247032	2000 BY_{12}	—	January 28, 2000	Kitt Peak	Spacewatch	CYB	4.5 km	MPC · JPL
247033	2000 BN_{43}	—	January 28, 2000	Kitt Peak	Spacewatch	·	2.1 km	MPC · JPL
247034	2000 CH_{76}	—	February 9, 2000	Višnjan	K. Korlević	·	2.2 km	MPC · JPL
247035	2000 DY_{24}	—	February 29, 2000	Socorro	LINEAR	·	3.2 km	MPC · JPL
247036	2000 EA_{31}	—	March 5, 2000	Socorro	LINEAR	·	1.3 km	MPC · JPL
247037	2000 EF_{72}	—	March 10, 2000	Kitt Peak	Spacewatch	MAR	1.7 km	MPC · JPL
247038	2000 ET_{83}	—	March 5, 2000	Socorro	LINEAR	·	3.5 km	MPC · JPL
247039	2000 ET_{111}	—	March 9, 2000	Kitt Peak	Spacewatch	·	3.0 km	MPC · JPL
247040	2000 EQ_{116}	—	March 10, 2000	Socorro	LINEAR	·	6.6 km	MPC · JPL
247041	2000 FJ_{1}	—	March 26, 2000	Socorro	LINEAR	EUP	7.4 km	MPC · JPL
247042	2000 FB_{55}	—	March 29, 2000	Socorro	LINEAR	·	3.9 km	MPC · JPL
247043	2000 GS_{11}	—	April 5, 2000	Socorro	LINEAR	·	5.5 km	MPC · JPL
247044	2000 GA_{24}	—	April 5, 2000	Socorro	LINEAR	·	4.5 km	MPC · JPL
247045	2000 GL_{156}	—	April 6, 2000	Socorro	LINEAR	EOS	3.4 km	MPC · JPL
247046	2000 GZ_{159}	—	April 7, 2000	Socorro	LINEAR	·	2.9 km	MPC · JPL
247047	2000 HB_{51}	—	April 29, 2000	Socorro	LINEAR	·	3.9 km	MPC · JPL
247048	2000 HJ_{101}	—	April 26, 2000	Kitt Peak	Spacewatch	·	5.6 km	MPC · JPL
247049	2000 HY_{101}	—	April 27, 2000	Anderson Mesa	LONEOS	·	3.4 km	MPC · JPL
247050	2000 JR_{31}	—	May 11, 2000	Kitt Peak	Spacewatch	·	5.1 km	MPC · JPL
247051	2000 LZ	—	June 2, 2000	Ondřejov	P. Pravec, P. Kušnirák	·	4.1 km	MPC · JPL
247052	2000 LP_{2}	—	June 1, 2000	Kitt Peak	Spacewatch	(18466)	2.0 km	MPC · JPL
247053	2000 NV_{19}	—	July 5, 2000	Anderson Mesa	LONEOS	·	3.0 km	MPC · JPL
247054	2000 OJ_{53}	—	July 30, 2000	Socorro	LINEAR	·	1.2 km	MPC · JPL
247055	2000 OD_{56}	—	July 29, 2000	Anderson Mesa	LONEOS	·	1.1 km	MPC · JPL
247056	2000 QW_{1}	—	August 22, 2000	Socorro	LINEAR	·	1.7 km	MPC · JPL
247057	2000 QO_{40}	—	August 24, 2000	Socorro	LINEAR	·	810 m	MPC · JPL
247058	2000 QV_{62}	—	August 28, 2000	Socorro	LINEAR	TIR	4.2 km	MPC · JPL
247059	2000 QC_{80}	—	August 24, 2000	Socorro	LINEAR	·	3.4 km	MPC · JPL
247060	2000 QC_{99}	—	August 28, 2000	Socorro	LINEAR	·	1.9 km	MPC · JPL
247061	2000 QF_{100}	—	August 28, 2000	Socorro	LINEAR	·	3.6 km	MPC · JPL
247062	2000 QN_{115}	—	August 25, 2000	Socorro	LINEAR	·	730 m	MPC · JPL
247063	2000 QY_{124}	—	August 29, 2000	Socorro	LINEAR	LIX	5.2 km	MPC · JPL
247064	2000 QE_{156}	—	August 31, 2000	Socorro	LINEAR	·	5.2 km	MPC · JPL
247065	2000 QZ_{218}	—	August 20, 2000	Anderson Mesa	LONEOS	TIN	3.4 km	MPC · JPL
247066	2000 RV_{16}	—	September 1, 2000	Socorro	LINEAR	·	1.0 km	MPC · JPL
247067	2000 RS_{25}	—	September 1, 2000	Socorro	LINEAR	LIX	4.8 km	MPC · JPL
247068	2000 RJ_{28}	—	September 1, 2000	Socorro	LINEAR	·	1.0 km	MPC · JPL
247069	2000 RM_{31}	—	September 1, 2000	Socorro	LINEAR	·	1.2 km	MPC · JPL
247070	2000 RN_{80}	—	September 1, 2000	Socorro	LINEAR	·	6.8 km	MPC · JPL
247071	2000 RG_{83}	—	September 1, 2000	Socorro	LINEAR	·	3.4 km	MPC · JPL
247072	2000 RH_{87}	—	September 2, 2000	Anderson Mesa	LONEOS	(883)	1.3 km	MPC · JPL
247073	2000 RB_{89}	—	September 3, 2000	Socorro	LINEAR	·	1.2 km	MPC · JPL
247074	2000 RN_{104}	—	September 6, 2000	Socorro	LINEAR	·	6.1 km	MPC · JPL
247075	2000 SB_{2}	—	September 20, 2000	Socorro	LINEAR	T_{j} (2.96)	7.8 km	MPC · JPL
247076	2000 SM_{15}	—	September 23, 2000	Socorro	LINEAR	EOS	4.6 km	MPC · JPL
247077	2000 SD_{40}	—	September 24, 2000	Socorro	LINEAR	·	990 m	MPC · JPL
247078	2000 SQ_{40}	—	September 24, 2000	Socorro	LINEAR	·	1.5 km	MPC · JPL
247079	2000 SE_{52}	—	September 23, 2000	Socorro	LINEAR	·	870 m	MPC · JPL
247080	2000 SV_{56}	—	September 24, 2000	Socorro	LINEAR	·	2.9 km	MPC · JPL
247081	2000 SS_{72}	—	September 24, 2000	Socorro	LINEAR	·	1.1 km	MPC · JPL
247082	2000 ST_{73}	—	September 24, 2000	Socorro	LINEAR	MAR ·	2.8 km	MPC · JPL
247083	2000 SQ_{83}	—	September 24, 2000	Socorro	LINEAR	TEL	2.1 km	MPC · JPL
247084	2000 SB_{115}	—	September 24, 2000	Socorro	LINEAR	·	1.4 km	MPC · JPL
247085	2000 ST_{136}	—	September 23, 2000	Socorro	LINEAR	·	2.8 km	MPC · JPL
247086	2000 SZ_{137}	—	September 23, 2000	Socorro	LINEAR	·	1.1 km	MPC · JPL
247087	2000 SC_{145}	—	September 24, 2000	Socorro	LINEAR	·	900 m	MPC · JPL
247088	2000 SS_{146}	—	September 24, 2000	Socorro	LINEAR	·	1 km	MPC · JPL
247089	2000 SP_{163}	—	September 21, 2000	Socorro	LINEAR	·	6.1 km	MPC · JPL
247090	2000 SH_{165}	—	September 23, 2000	Socorro	LINEAR	·	1.4 km	MPC · JPL
247091	2000 SX_{177}	—	September 28, 2000	Socorro	LINEAR	slow	2.8 km	MPC · JPL
247092	2000 SD_{187}	—	September 21, 2000	Haleakala	NEAT	·	1.0 km	MPC · JPL
247093	2000 SJ_{223}	—	September 27, 2000	Socorro	LINEAR	·	3.8 km	MPC · JPL
247094	2000 SJ_{249}	—	September 24, 2000	Socorro	LINEAR	·	780 m	MPC · JPL
247095	2000 SK_{262}	—	September 25, 2000	Socorro	LINEAR	·	2.7 km	MPC · JPL
247096	2000 ST_{290}	—	September 27, 2000	Socorro	LINEAR	·	5.0 km	MPC · JPL
247097	2000 SL_{294}	—	September 27, 2000	Socorro	LINEAR	·	3.7 km	MPC · JPL
247098	2000 SE_{299}	—	September 28, 2000	Socorro	LINEAR	·	1.1 km	MPC · JPL
247099	2000 SH_{299}	—	September 28, 2000	Socorro	LINEAR	LIX	5.6 km	MPC · JPL
247100	2000 SE_{305}	—	September 30, 2000	Socorro	LINEAR	·	1.2 km	MPC · JPL

== 247101–247200 ==
back to top

Designation			Discovery			Properties		Ref
Permanent	Provisional	Named after	Date	Site	Discoverer(s)	Category	Diam.	Ref
247101	2000 SL_{314}	—	September 28, 2000	Socorro	LINEAR	·	4.9 km	MPC · JPL
247102	2000 SA_{315}	—	September 28, 2000	Socorro	LINEAR	L5	14 km	MPC · JPL
247103	2000 SL_{317}	—	September 30, 2000	Socorro	LINEAR	·	5.4 km	MPC · JPL
247104	2000 SY_{345}	—	September 21, 2000	Kitt Peak	M. W. Buie	·	920 m	MPC · JPL
247105	2000 SQ_{348}	—	September 30, 2000	Anderson Mesa	LONEOS	·	5.0 km	MPC · JPL
247106	2000 TF_{6}	—	October 1, 2000	Socorro	LINEAR	·	900 m	MPC · JPL
247107	2000 TE_{16}	—	October 1, 2000	Socorro	LINEAR	THM	4.0 km	MPC · JPL
247108	2000 TG_{58}	—	October 2, 2000	Socorro	LINEAR	·	1.3 km	MPC · JPL
247109	2000 TT_{59}	—	October 2, 2000	Anderson Mesa	LONEOS	·	3.4 km	MPC · JPL
247110	2000 TS_{61}	—	October 2, 2000	Socorro	LINEAR	·	1.0 km	MPC · JPL
247111	2000 TZ_{63}	—	October 3, 2000	Socorro	LINEAR	·	3.1 km	MPC · JPL
247112	2000 UL	—	October 19, 2000	Needville	A. Cruz, W. G. Dillon	EOS	2.9 km	MPC · JPL
247113	2000 UC_{12}	—	October 18, 2000	Socorro	LINEAR	·	2.8 km	MPC · JPL
247114	2000 UA_{23}	—	October 24, 2000	Socorro	LINEAR	·	1.1 km	MPC · JPL
247115	2000 UY_{43}	—	October 24, 2000	Socorro	LINEAR	·	2.2 km	MPC · JPL
247116	2000 UQ_{52}	—	October 24, 2000	Socorro	LINEAR	·	1.9 km	MPC · JPL
247117	2000 UJ_{63}	—	October 25, 2000	Socorro	LINEAR	·	1.3 km	MPC · JPL
247118	2000 UK_{63}	—	October 25, 2000	Socorro	LINEAR	TRE	3.9 km	MPC · JPL
247119	2000 UP_{63}	—	October 25, 2000	Socorro	LINEAR	·	1.3 km	MPC · JPL
247120	2000 UJ_{70}	—	October 25, 2000	Socorro	LINEAR	·	1.1 km	MPC · JPL
247121	2000 UL_{74}	—	October 29, 2000	Socorro	LINEAR	·	3.9 km	MPC · JPL
247122	2000 UF_{77}	—	October 24, 2000	Socorro	LINEAR	·	4.1 km	MPC · JPL
247123	2000 UE_{96}	—	October 25, 2000	Socorro	LINEAR	·	1.2 km	MPC · JPL
247124	2000 UR_{98}	—	October 25, 2000	Socorro	LINEAR	·	2.2 km	MPC · JPL
247125	2000 UQ_{102}	—	October 25, 2000	Socorro	LINEAR	JUN	1.9 km	MPC · JPL
247126	2000 UE_{103}	—	October 25, 2000	Socorro	LINEAR	BRG	3.3 km	MPC · JPL
247127	2000 VA_{12}	—	November 1, 2000	Socorro	LINEAR	·	950 m	MPC · JPL
247128	2000 VO_{18}	—	November 1, 2000	Socorro	LINEAR	·	4.2 km	MPC · JPL
247129	2000 VQ_{33}	—	November 1, 2000	Socorro	LINEAR	·	6.3 km	MPC · JPL
247130	2000 VW_{41}	—	November 1, 2000	Socorro	LINEAR	·	1.9 km	MPC · JPL
247131	2000 VG_{43}	—	November 1, 2000	Socorro	LINEAR	NYS ·	2.5 km	MPC · JPL
247132	2000 WV_{16}	—	November 21, 2000	Socorro	LINEAR	·	5.7 km	MPC · JPL
247133	2000 WQ_{38}	—	November 20, 2000	Socorro	LINEAR	·	5.2 km	MPC · JPL
247134	2000 WQ_{39}	—	November 20, 2000	Socorro	LINEAR	·	6.7 km	MPC · JPL
247135	2000 WA_{72}	—	November 19, 2000	Socorro	LINEAR	·	4.6 km	MPC · JPL
247136	2000 WS_{82}	—	November 20, 2000	Socorro	LINEAR	URS	6.9 km	MPC · JPL
247137	2000 WR_{92}	—	November 21, 2000	Socorro	LINEAR	·	2.1 km	MPC · JPL
247138	2000 WY_{94}	—	November 21, 2000	Socorro	LINEAR	LIX	6.4 km	MPC · JPL
247139	2000 WP_{104}	—	November 27, 2000	Eskridge	G. Hug	ERI	2.4 km	MPC · JPL
247140	2000 WL_{114}	—	November 20, 2000	Socorro	LINEAR	·	3.0 km	MPC · JPL
247141	2000 WD_{153}	—	November 29, 2000	Socorro	LINEAR	·	3.8 km	MPC · JPL
247142	2000 WR_{154}	—	November 30, 2000	Socorro	LINEAR	(194)	3.3 km	MPC · JPL
247143	2000 WQ_{190}	—	November 18, 2000	Anderson Mesa	LONEOS	·	1.0 km	MPC · JPL
247144	2000 WV_{190}	—	November 18, 2000	Anderson Mesa	LONEOS	·	1.2 km	MPC · JPL
247145	2000 XG_{7}	—	December 1, 2000	Socorro	LINEAR	·	2.8 km	MPC · JPL
247146	2000 XC_{12}	—	December 4, 2000	Socorro	LINEAR	GEF ·	3.0 km	MPC · JPL
247147	2000 XX_{12}	—	December 4, 2000	Socorro	LINEAR	LIX	6.9 km	MPC · JPL
247148	2000 XR_{14}	—	December 1, 2000	Haleakala	NEAT	·	4.1 km	MPC · JPL
247149	2000 XM_{23}	—	December 4, 2000	Socorro	LINEAR	·	7.7 km	MPC · JPL
247150	2000 XP_{25}	—	December 4, 2000	Socorro	LINEAR	·	3.7 km	MPC · JPL
247151	2000 XR_{44}	—	December 8, 2000	Bohyunsan	Jeon, Y.-B., Lee, B.-C.	·	3.2 km	MPC · JPL
247152	2000 XO_{46}	—	December 7, 2000	Socorro	LINEAR	·	6.8 km	MPC · JPL
247153	2000 YH_{10}	—	December 21, 2000	Socorro	LINEAR	·	5.9 km	MPC · JPL
247154	2000 YA_{21}	—	December 28, 2000	Kitt Peak	Spacewatch	·	6.0 km	MPC · JPL
247155	2000 YL_{22}	—	December 28, 2000	Kitt Peak	Spacewatch	·	6.6 km	MPC · JPL
247156	2000 YH_{29}	—	December 23, 2000	Socorro	LINEAR	AMO +1km	1.7 km	MPC · JPL
247157	2000 YY_{32}	—	December 30, 2000	Socorro	LINEAR	·	1.3 km	MPC · JPL
247158	2000 YW_{38}	—	December 30, 2000	Socorro	LINEAR	·	1.4 km	MPC · JPL
247159	2000 YK_{51}	—	December 30, 2000	Socorro	LINEAR	·	5.0 km	MPC · JPL
247160	2000 YF_{54}	—	December 30, 2000	Socorro	LINEAR	·	5.0 km	MPC · JPL
247161	2000 YZ_{66}	—	December 30, 2000	Kitt Peak	Spacewatch	·	4.4 km	MPC · JPL
247162	2000 YO_{103}	—	December 28, 2000	Socorro	LINEAR	PHO	1.2 km	MPC · JPL
247163	2000 YS_{123}	—	December 28, 2000	Kitt Peak	Spacewatch	·	6.5 km	MPC · JPL
247164	2000 YL_{131}	—	December 30, 2000	Anderson Mesa	LONEOS	·	5.3 km	MPC · JPL
247165	2000 YN_{134}	—	December 31, 2000	Anderson Mesa	LONEOS	·	6.3 km	MPC · JPL
247166	2000 YW_{135}	—	December 22, 2000	Socorro	LINEAR	·	3.9 km	MPC · JPL
247167	2001 AT_{15}	—	January 2, 2001	Socorro	LINEAR	PHO	2.1 km	MPC · JPL
247168	2001 AM_{28}	—	January 5, 2001	Socorro	LINEAR	·	5.8 km	MPC · JPL
247169	2001 AX_{43}	—	January 14, 2001	Kitt Peak	Spacewatch	·	1.6 km	MPC · JPL
247170	2001 BY_{10}	—	January 16, 2001	Calar Alto	Calar Alto	·	3.2 km	MPC · JPL
247171	2001 BD_{15}	—	January 21, 2001	Oizumi	T. Kobayashi	·	6.5 km	MPC · JPL
247172	2001 BX_{19}	—	January 19, 2001	Socorro	LINEAR	·	3.1 km	MPC · JPL
247173	2001 BG_{36}	—	January 19, 2001	Socorro	LINEAR	·	5.4 km	MPC · JPL
247174	2001 BS_{40}	—	January 21, 2001	Socorro	LINEAR	·	1.8 km	MPC · JPL
247175	2001 BP_{80}	—	January 20, 2001	Haleakala	NEAT	EUP	7.0 km	MPC · JPL
247176	2001 BF_{82}	—	January 16, 2001	Haleakala	NEAT	·	4.2 km	MPC · JPL
247177	2001 CF_{18}	—	February 2, 2001	Socorro	LINEAR	·	4.9 km	MPC · JPL
247178	2001 CQ_{32}	—	February 13, 2001	Socorro	LINEAR	·	7.2 km	MPC · JPL
247179	2001 DC_{9}	—	February 17, 2001	Socorro	LINEAR	PHO	1.5 km	MPC · JPL
247180	2001 DH_{38}	—	February 19, 2001	Socorro	LINEAR	·	1.8 km	MPC · JPL
247181	2001 DC_{51}	—	February 16, 2001	Socorro	LINEAR	·	4.2 km	MPC · JPL
247182	2001 DT_{60}	—	February 19, 2001	Socorro	LINEAR	HYG	3.8 km	MPC · JPL
247183	2001 DP_{87}	—	February 25, 2001	Haleakala	NEAT	BAR	2.7 km	MPC · JPL
247184	2001 DJ_{91}	—	February 20, 2001	Socorro	LINEAR	·	2.1 km	MPC · JPL
247185	2001 EQ_{2}	—	March 1, 2001	Socorro	LINEAR	·	3.7 km	MPC · JPL
247186	2001 EO_{18}	—	March 14, 2001	Anderson Mesa	LONEOS	URS	6.7 km	MPC · JPL
247187	2001 FK_{109}	—	March 18, 2001	Socorro	LINEAR	·	1.7 km	MPC · JPL
247188	2001 FP_{115}	—	March 19, 2001	Socorro	LINEAR	·	2.3 km	MPC · JPL
247189	2001 KV_{15}	—	May 18, 2001	Socorro	LINEAR	·	2.6 km	MPC · JPL
247190	2001 KA_{39}	—	May 22, 2001	Socorro	LINEAR	·	3.1 km	MPC · JPL
247191	2001 LY_{8}	—	June 15, 2001	Socorro	LINEAR	·	2.7 km	MPC · JPL
247192	2001 MN_{31}	—	June 27, 2001	Anderson Mesa	LONEOS	·	2.9 km	MPC · JPL
247193	2001 NQ_{3}	—	July 13, 2001	Palomar	NEAT	·	2.2 km	MPC · JPL
247194	2001 NR_{11}	—	July 12, 2001	Palomar	NEAT	·	3.4 km	MPC · JPL
247195	2001 OB_{2}	—	July 18, 2001	Palomar	NEAT	BRA	2.4 km	MPC · JPL
247196	2001 OS_{58}	—	July 20, 2001	Palomar	NEAT	EUP	7.0 km	MPC · JPL
247197	2001 OV_{84}	—	July 19, 2001	Anderson Mesa	LONEOS	·	6.4 km	MPC · JPL
247198	2001 OM_{86}	—	July 27, 2001	Palomar	NEAT	·	3.0 km	MPC · JPL
247199	2001 OF_{97}	—	July 25, 2001	Haleakala	NEAT	·	1.2 km	MPC · JPL
247200	2001 OZ_{103}	—	July 30, 2001	Socorro	LINEAR	·	1.0 km	MPC · JPL

== 247201–247300 ==
back to top

Designation			Discovery			Properties		Ref
Permanent	Provisional	Named after	Date	Site	Discoverer(s)	Category	Diam.	Ref
247201	2001 OO_{109}	—	July 31, 2001	Kleť	Kleť	·	3.2 km	MPC · JPL
247202	2001 PR	—	August 6, 2001	Haleakala	NEAT	·	2.0 km	MPC · JPL
247203	2001 PK_{4}	—	August 8, 2001	Haleakala	NEAT	·	2.5 km	MPC · JPL
247204	2001 PE_{20}	—	August 10, 2001	Palomar	NEAT	·	3.4 km	MPC · JPL
247205	2001 PR_{20}	—	August 10, 2001	Palomar	NEAT	·	3.4 km	MPC · JPL
247206	2001 PC_{27}	—	August 11, 2001	Haleakala	NEAT	AEO	2.0 km	MPC · JPL
247207	2001 PO_{27}	—	August 11, 2001	Haleakala	NEAT	·	2.0 km	MPC · JPL
247208	2001 PN_{28}	—	August 13, 2001	San Marcello	A. Boattini, L. Tesi	·	3.1 km	MPC · JPL
247209	2001 QU_{5}	—	August 16, 2001	Socorro	LINEAR	·	3.4 km	MPC · JPL
247210	2001 QS_{7}	—	August 16, 2001	Socorro	LINEAR	·	2.7 km	MPC · JPL
247211	2001 QU_{9}	—	August 16, 2001	Socorro	LINEAR	·	3.8 km	MPC · JPL
247212	2001 QO_{49}	—	August 16, 2001	Socorro	LINEAR	·	2.8 km	MPC · JPL
247213	2001 QO_{51}	—	August 16, 2001	Socorro	LINEAR	EUN	1.9 km	MPC · JPL
247214	2001 QE_{63}	—	August 16, 2001	Socorro	LINEAR	·	3.8 km	MPC · JPL
247215	2001 QD_{90}	—	August 16, 2001	Palomar	NEAT	·	2.7 km	MPC · JPL
247216	2001 QA_{93}	—	August 22, 2001	Socorro	LINEAR	ADE	4.7 km	MPC · JPL
247217	2001 QT_{109}	—	August 21, 2001	Palomar	NEAT	·	2.1 km	MPC · JPL
247218	2001 QL_{119}	—	August 17, 2001	Socorro	LINEAR	·	2.1 km	MPC · JPL
247219	2001 QC_{129}	—	August 20, 2001	Socorro	LINEAR	GEF	1.7 km	MPC · JPL
247220	2001 QJ_{129}	—	August 20, 2001	Socorro	LINEAR	·	6.1 km	MPC · JPL
247221	2001 QV_{129}	—	August 20, 2001	Socorro	LINEAR	·	2.6 km	MPC · JPL
247222	2001 QQ_{136}	—	August 22, 2001	Socorro	LINEAR	·	1.6 km	MPC · JPL
247223	2001 QV_{148}	—	August 20, 2001	Haleakala	NEAT	·	2.1 km	MPC · JPL
247224	2001 QG_{153}	—	August 23, 2001	Desert Eagle	W. K. Y. Yeung	·	3.4 km	MPC · JPL
247225	2001 QW_{155}	—	August 23, 2001	Anderson Mesa	LONEOS	·	2.9 km	MPC · JPL
247226	2001 QM_{159}	—	August 23, 2001	Anderson Mesa	LONEOS	·	2.5 km	MPC · JPL
247227	2001 QP_{171}	—	August 25, 2001	Socorro	LINEAR	·	1.4 km	MPC · JPL
247228	2001 QZ_{194}	—	August 22, 2001	Socorro	LINEAR	·	2.7 km	MPC · JPL
247229	2001 QB_{195}	—	August 22, 2001	Socorro	LINEAR	·	1.7 km	MPC · JPL
247230	2001 QU_{204}	—	August 23, 2001	Anderson Mesa	LONEOS	·	2.4 km	MPC · JPL
247231	2001 QA_{210}	—	August 23, 2001	Anderson Mesa	LONEOS	GEF	3.0 km	MPC · JPL
247232	2001 QS_{219}	—	August 23, 2001	Socorro	LINEAR	·	2.4 km	MPC · JPL
247233	2001 QT_{221}	—	August 24, 2001	Anderson Mesa	LONEOS	·	2.7 km	MPC · JPL
247234	2001 QH_{244}	—	August 24, 2001	Socorro	LINEAR	LUT	5.7 km	MPC · JPL
247235	2001 QP_{245}	—	August 24, 2001	Socorro	LINEAR	EUN	2.0 km	MPC · JPL
247236	2001 QY_{250}	—	August 24, 2001	Haleakala	NEAT	·	2.1 km	MPC · JPL
247237	2001 QK_{251}	—	August 25, 2001	Socorro	LINEAR	·	2.8 km	MPC · JPL
247238	2001 QW_{255}	—	August 25, 2001	Socorro	LINEAR	·	3.9 km	MPC · JPL
247239	2001 QC_{259}	—	August 25, 2001	Socorro	LINEAR	·	3.6 km	MPC · JPL
247240	2001 QX_{273}	—	August 19, 2001	Socorro	LINEAR	·	6.7 km	MPC · JPL
247241	2001 QN_{285}	—	August 23, 2001	Haleakala	NEAT	HOF	3.4 km	MPC · JPL
247242	2001 QH_{287}	—	August 17, 2001	Socorro	LINEAR	·	2.5 km	MPC · JPL
247243	2001 RL_{1}	—	September 7, 2001	Socorro	LINEAR	MRX	1.7 km	MPC · JPL
247244	2001 RN_{3}	—	September 8, 2001	Anderson Mesa	LONEOS	·	2.3 km	MPC · JPL
247245	2001 RV_{13}	—	September 10, 2001	Socorro	LINEAR	·	3.6 km	MPC · JPL
247246	2001 RB_{33}	—	September 8, 2001	Socorro	LINEAR	·	2.8 km	MPC · JPL
247247	2001 RT_{38}	—	September 9, 2001	Socorro	LINEAR	·	2.3 km	MPC · JPL
247248	2001 RB_{40}	—	September 10, 2001	Socorro	LINEAR	·	2.3 km	MPC · JPL
247249	2001 RF_{43}	—	September 11, 2001	Terre Haute	Observatory, Oakley	·	1.8 km	MPC · JPL
247250	2001 RQ_{48}	—	September 11, 2001	Socorro	LINEAR	TIN	2.7 km	MPC · JPL
247251	2001 RL_{50}	—	September 10, 2001	Socorro	LINEAR	VER	4.3 km	MPC · JPL
247252	2001 RB_{57}	—	September 12, 2001	Socorro	LINEAR	VER	3.7 km	MPC · JPL
247253	2001 RX_{59}	—	September 12, 2001	Socorro	LINEAR	·	3.1 km	MPC · JPL
247254	2001 RP_{80}	—	September 14, 2001	Palomar	NEAT	DOR	3.2 km	MPC · JPL
247255	2001 RT_{82}	—	September 11, 2001	Anderson Mesa	LONEOS	·	3.1 km	MPC · JPL
247256	2001 RR_{85}	—	September 11, 2001	Anderson Mesa	LONEOS	·	2.4 km	MPC · JPL
247257	2001 RX_{88}	—	September 11, 2001	Anderson Mesa	LONEOS	·	3.4 km	MPC · JPL
247258	2001 RZ_{93}	—	September 11, 2001	Anderson Mesa	LONEOS	·	2.7 km	MPC · JPL
247259	2001 RT_{98}	—	September 8, 2001	Socorro	LINEAR	·	6.6 km	MPC · JPL
247260	2001 RX_{109}	—	September 12, 2001	Socorro	LINEAR	·	6.3 km	MPC · JPL
247261	2001 RH_{123}	—	September 12, 2001	Socorro	LINEAR	·	6.3 km	MPC · JPL
247262	2001 RM_{146}	—	September 9, 2001	Palomar	NEAT	·	6.5 km	MPC · JPL
247263	2001 RD_{148}	—	September 10, 2001	Anderson Mesa	LONEOS	·	3.0 km	MPC · JPL
247264	2001 SW_{8}	—	September 19, 2001	Fountain Hills	C. W. Juels, P. R. Holvorcem	·	2.7 km	MPC · JPL
247265	2001 SP_{13}	—	September 16, 2001	Socorro	LINEAR	DOR	3.6 km	MPC · JPL
247266	2001 SP_{26}	—	September 16, 2001	Socorro	LINEAR	·	5.0 km	MPC · JPL
247267	2001 SV_{49}	—	September 16, 2001	Socorro	LINEAR	·	2.0 km	MPC · JPL
247268	2001 SF_{62}	—	September 17, 2001	Socorro	LINEAR	·	2.1 km	MPC · JPL
247269	2001 SY_{63}	—	September 17, 2001	Socorro	LINEAR	·	3.3 km	MPC · JPL
247270	2001 SG_{87}	—	September 20, 2001	Socorro	LINEAR	AGN	1.4 km	MPC · JPL
247271	2001 SF_{89}	—	September 20, 2001	Socorro	LINEAR	HOF	3.5 km	MPC · JPL
247272	2001 SU_{92}	—	September 20, 2001	Socorro	LINEAR	·	2.0 km	MPC · JPL
247273	2001 SX_{104}	—	September 20, 2001	Socorro	LINEAR	·	2.7 km	MPC · JPL
247274	2001 SU_{116}	—	September 16, 2001	Socorro	LINEAR	·	7.3 km	MPC · JPL
247275	2001 SH_{119}	—	September 16, 2001	Socorro	LINEAR	·	3.1 km	MPC · JPL
247276	2001 SU_{123}	—	September 16, 2001	Socorro	LINEAR	·	5.1 km	MPC · JPL
247277	2001 SK_{135}	—	September 16, 2001	Socorro	LINEAR	·	3.1 km	MPC · JPL
247278	2001 SR_{144}	—	September 16, 2001	Socorro	LINEAR	·	6.3 km	MPC · JPL
247279	2001 SG_{148}	—	September 17, 2001	Socorro	LINEAR	·	5.8 km	MPC · JPL
247280	2001 SY_{149}	—	September 17, 2001	Socorro	LINEAR	·	2.5 km	MPC · JPL
247281	2001 SR_{155}	—	September 17, 2001	Socorro	LINEAR	slow	6.5 km	MPC · JPL
247282	2001 SK_{181}	—	September 19, 2001	Socorro	LINEAR	·	3.7 km	MPC · JPL
247283	2001 SC_{187}	—	September 19, 2001	Socorro	LINEAR	slow	6.4 km	MPC · JPL
247284	2001 ST_{199}	—	September 19, 2001	Socorro	LINEAR	·	2.7 km	MPC · JPL
247285	2001 SC_{205}	—	September 19, 2001	Socorro	LINEAR	·	3.5 km	MPC · JPL
247286	2001 SE_{206}	—	September 19, 2001	Socorro	LINEAR	·	4.1 km	MPC · JPL
247287	2001 SE_{246}	—	September 19, 2001	Socorro	LINEAR	·	2.5 km	MPC · JPL
247288	2001 SC_{250}	—	September 19, 2001	Socorro	LINEAR	CYB	6.0 km	MPC · JPL
247289	2001 SL_{258}	—	September 20, 2001	Socorro	LINEAR	·	3.9 km	MPC · JPL
247290	2001 SS_{284}	—	September 22, 2001	Kitt Peak	Spacewatch	·	3.4 km	MPC · JPL
247291	2001 SM_{294}	—	September 20, 2001	Socorro	LINEAR	·	2.8 km	MPC · JPL
247292	2001 SW_{294}	—	September 20, 2001	Socorro	LINEAR	·	2.0 km	MPC · JPL
247293	2001 SR_{299}	—	September 20, 2001	Socorro	LINEAR	AGN	1.3 km	MPC · JPL
247294	2001 SA_{305}	—	September 20, 2001	Socorro	LINEAR	·	4.4 km	MPC · JPL
247295	2001 SA_{344}	—	September 23, 2001	Kitt Peak	Spacewatch	ADE ·	1.9 km	MPC · JPL
247296	2001 SQ_{345}	—	September 23, 2001	Haleakala	NEAT	·	2.3 km	MPC · JPL
247297	2001 SH_{354}	—	September 26, 2001	Palomar	NEAT	L5	18 km	MPC · JPL
247298	2001 TS_{24}	—	October 14, 2001	Socorro	LINEAR	·	5.7 km	MPC · JPL
247299	2001 TK_{49}	—	October 15, 2001	Desert Eagle	W. K. Y. Yeung	·	2.1 km	MPC · JPL
247300	2001 TF_{57}	—	October 13, 2001	Socorro	LINEAR	DOR	3.6 km	MPC · JPL

== 247301–247400 ==
back to top

Designation			Discovery			Properties		Ref
Permanent	Provisional	Named after	Date	Site	Discoverer(s)	Category	Diam.	Ref
247301	2001 TW_{57}	—	October 13, 2001	Socorro	LINEAR	·	2.0 km	MPC · JPL
247302	2001 TY_{60}	—	October 13, 2001	Socorro	LINEAR	·	2.2 km	MPC · JPL
247303	2001 TY_{68}	—	October 13, 2001	Socorro	LINEAR	DOR	3.1 km	MPC · JPL
247304	2001 TW_{78}	—	October 13, 2001	Socorro	LINEAR	·	4.9 km	MPC · JPL
247305	2001 TS_{84}	—	October 14, 2001	Socorro	LINEAR	·	3.1 km	MPC · JPL
247306	2001 TR_{88}	—	October 14, 2001	Socorro	LINEAR	·	2.5 km	MPC · JPL
247307	2001 TA_{92}	—	October 14, 2001	Socorro	LINEAR	·	3.2 km	MPC · JPL
247308	2001 TH_{121}	—	October 15, 2001	Socorro	LINEAR	·	6.9 km	MPC · JPL
247309	2001 TO_{121}	—	October 15, 2001	Socorro	LINEAR	·	3.0 km	MPC · JPL
247310	2001 TK_{123}	—	October 12, 2001	Haleakala	NEAT	·	8.0 km	MPC · JPL
247311	2001 TD_{125}	—	October 12, 2001	Haleakala	NEAT	GEF ·	3.8 km	MPC · JPL
247312	2001 TM_{162}	—	October 11, 2001	Palomar	NEAT	EOS	3.2 km	MPC · JPL
247313	2001 TP_{168}	—	October 15, 2001	Socorro	LINEAR	·	2.2 km	MPC · JPL
247314	2001 TE_{169}	—	October 15, 2001	Socorro	LINEAR	·	3.0 km	MPC · JPL
247315	2001 TP_{176}	—	October 14, 2001	Socorro	LINEAR	L5	16 km	MPC · JPL
247316	2001 TH_{180}	—	October 14, 2001	Socorro	LINEAR	·	5.6 km	MPC · JPL
247317	2001 TV_{183}	—	October 14, 2001	Socorro	LINEAR	·	4.8 km	MPC · JPL
247318	2001 TM_{186}	—	October 14, 2001	Socorro	LINEAR	·	3.6 km	MPC · JPL
247319	2001 TG_{199}	—	October 11, 2001	Socorro	LINEAR	·	2.4 km	MPC · JPL
247320	2001 TU_{200}	—	October 11, 2001	Socorro	LINEAR	·	2.3 km	MPC · JPL
247321	2001 TG_{209}	—	October 12, 2001	Haleakala	NEAT	·	2.7 km	MPC · JPL
247322	2001 TA_{228}	—	October 15, 2001	Socorro	LINEAR	·	2.6 km	MPC · JPL
247323	2001 TY_{232}	—	October 15, 2001	Kitt Peak	Spacewatch	L5	13 km	MPC · JPL
247324	2001 TT_{248}	—	October 14, 2001	Apache Point	SDSS	·	2.0 km	MPC · JPL
247325	2001 TU_{249}	—	October 14, 2001	Apache Point	SDSS	·	1.9 km	MPC · JPL
247326	2001 UZ_{22}	—	October 18, 2001	Socorro	LINEAR	·	2.0 km	MPC · JPL
247327	2001 UJ_{45}	—	October 17, 2001	Socorro	LINEAR	·	2.7 km	MPC · JPL
247328	2001 UV_{56}	—	October 17, 2001	Socorro	LINEAR	PAD	3.1 km	MPC · JPL
247329	2001 UF_{59}	—	October 17, 2001	Socorro	LINEAR	·	6.0 km	MPC · JPL
247330	2001 UJ_{60}	—	October 17, 2001	Socorro	LINEAR	·	2.4 km	MPC · JPL
247331	2001 UR_{78}	—	October 20, 2001	Socorro	LINEAR	·	5.5 km	MPC · JPL
247332	2001 UK_{108}	—	October 20, 2001	Socorro	LINEAR	·	2.1 km	MPC · JPL
247333	2001 UB_{112}	—	October 21, 2001	Socorro	LINEAR	·	5.3 km	MPC · JPL
247334	2001 UF_{124}	—	October 22, 2001	Palomar	NEAT	·	3.8 km	MPC · JPL
247335	2001 UT_{135}	—	October 22, 2001	Socorro	LINEAR	AEO	1.7 km	MPC · JPL
247336	2001 UP_{145}	—	October 23, 2001	Socorro	LINEAR	·	2.2 km	MPC · JPL
247337	2001 UP_{151}	—	October 23, 2001	Socorro	LINEAR	·	2.9 km	MPC · JPL
247338	2001 UJ_{169}	—	October 19, 2001	Socorro	LINEAR	·	4.2 km	MPC · JPL
247339	2001 UP_{200}	—	October 19, 2001	Palomar	NEAT	·	4.8 km	MPC · JPL
247340	2001 UD_{206}	—	October 20, 2001	Socorro	LINEAR	DOR	2.6 km	MPC · JPL
247341 Shaulladany	2001 UV_{209}	Shaulladany	October 20, 2001	Haleakala	NEAT	L5 · 010	16 km	MPC · JPL
247342	2001 UL_{210}	—	October 21, 2001	Anderson Mesa	LONEOS	PHO	3.4 km	MPC · JPL
247343	2001 UU_{219}	—	October 17, 2001	Socorro	LINEAR	·	4.2 km	MPC · JPL
247344	2001 UZ_{220}	—	October 21, 2001	Socorro	LINEAR	·	2.7 km	MPC · JPL
247345	2001 UH_{224}	—	October 29, 2001	Palomar	NEAT	·	3.0 km	MPC · JPL
247346	2001 VK	—	November 5, 2001	Eskridge	G. Hug	·	3.5 km	MPC · JPL
247347	2001 VV_{16}	—	November 11, 2001	Socorro	LINEAR	·	6.8 km	MPC · JPL
247348	2001 VT_{20}	—	November 9, 2001	Socorro	LINEAR	ERI	2.6 km	MPC · JPL
247349	2001 VZ_{40}	—	November 9, 2001	Socorro	LINEAR	·	7.0 km	MPC · JPL
247350	2001 VP_{49}	—	November 10, 2001	Socorro	LINEAR	·	4.5 km	MPC · JPL
247351	2001 VB_{52}	—	November 10, 2001	Socorro	LINEAR	L5	16 km	MPC · JPL
247352	2001 VR_{57}	—	November 10, 2001	Socorro	LINEAR	BRA	2.5 km	MPC · JPL
247353	2001 VW_{59}	—	November 10, 2001	Socorro	LINEAR	·	1.4 km	MPC · JPL
247354	2001 VG_{101}	—	November 12, 2001	Socorro	LINEAR	SYL · CYB	6.9 km	MPC · JPL
247355	2001 VH_{122}	—	November 13, 2001	Haleakala	NEAT	·	5.1 km	MPC · JPL
247356	2001 VM_{132}	—	November 12, 2001	Apache Point	SDSS	·	3.1 km	MPC · JPL
247357	2001 WW_{10}	—	November 17, 2001	Socorro	LINEAR	DOR	3.7 km	MPC · JPL
247358	2001 WQ_{67}	—	November 20, 2001	Socorro	LINEAR	·	5.9 km	MPC · JPL
247359	2001 WC_{84}	—	November 20, 2001	Socorro	LINEAR	·	3.3 km	MPC · JPL
247360	2001 XU	—	December 7, 2001	Palomar	NEAT	T_{j} (2.75) · APO · PHA	480 m	MPC · JPL
247361	2001 XY_{1}	—	December 8, 2001	Socorro	LINEAR	GAL	1.8 km	MPC · JPL
247362	2001 XX_{6}	—	December 11, 2001	Socorro	LINEAR	H	1.4 km	MPC · JPL
247363	2001 XG_{12}	—	December 9, 2001	Socorro	LINEAR	ERI	2.8 km	MPC · JPL
247364	2001 XK_{36}	—	December 9, 2001	Socorro	LINEAR	GEF	3.5 km	MPC · JPL
247365	2001 XC_{38}	—	December 9, 2001	Socorro	LINEAR	·	1.8 km	MPC · JPL
247366	2001 XN_{38}	—	December 9, 2001	Socorro	LINEAR	·	4.9 km	MPC · JPL
247367	2001 XN_{49}	—	December 10, 2001	Socorro	LINEAR	AST	2.9 km	MPC · JPL
247368	2001 XO_{51}	—	December 10, 2001	Socorro	LINEAR	·	5.1 km	MPC · JPL
247369	2001 XH_{61}	—	December 10, 2001	Socorro	LINEAR	·	4.1 km	MPC · JPL
247370	2001 XJ_{65}	—	December 10, 2001	Socorro	LINEAR	·	2.8 km	MPC · JPL
247371	2001 XD_{68}	—	December 10, 2001	Socorro	LINEAR	PHO	1.7 km	MPC · JPL
247372	2001 XY_{80}	—	December 11, 2001	Socorro	LINEAR	KON	2.8 km	MPC · JPL
247373	2001 XG_{86}	—	December 11, 2001	Socorro	LINEAR	·	4.7 km	MPC · JPL
247374	2001 XT_{110}	—	December 11, 2001	Socorro	LINEAR	·	3.4 km	MPC · JPL
247375	2001 XJ_{169}	—	December 14, 2001	Socorro	LINEAR	·	3.0 km	MPC · JPL
247376	2001 XZ_{197}	—	December 14, 2001	Socorro	LINEAR	PHO	2.2 km	MPC · JPL
247377	2001 XQ_{221}	—	December 15, 2001	Socorro	LINEAR	·	4.5 km	MPC · JPL
247378	2001 XW_{230}	—	December 15, 2001	Socorro	LINEAR	·	2.1 km	MPC · JPL
247379	2001 XM_{231}	—	December 15, 2001	Socorro	LINEAR	·	2.2 km	MPC · JPL
247380	2001 XU_{233}	—	December 15, 2001	Socorro	LINEAR	·	2.5 km	MPC · JPL
247381	2001 XZ_{260}	—	December 11, 2001	Kitt Peak	Spacewatch	PAD	2.9 km	MPC · JPL
247382	2001 YP_{55}	—	December 18, 2001	Socorro	LINEAR	·	5.2 km	MPC · JPL
247383	2001 YE_{63}	—	December 18, 2001	Socorro	LINEAR	·	5.3 km	MPC · JPL
247384	2001 YQ_{73}	—	December 18, 2001	Socorro	LINEAR	·	5.5 km	MPC · JPL
247385	2001 YD_{95}	—	December 18, 2001	Palomar	NEAT	·	6.8 km	MPC · JPL
247386	2001 YH_{96}	—	December 18, 2001	Palomar	NEAT	·	4.8 km	MPC · JPL
247387	2001 YS_{115}	—	December 17, 2001	Socorro	LINEAR	·	3.8 km	MPC · JPL
247388	2001 YA_{122}	—	December 17, 2001	Socorro	LINEAR	DOR · slow	5.3 km	MPC · JPL
247389	2001 YX_{124}	—	December 17, 2001	Socorro	LINEAR	·	2.9 km	MPC · JPL
247390	2001 YZ_{151}	—	December 19, 2001	Palomar	NEAT	·	3.0 km	MPC · JPL
247391	2002 AA_{22}	—	January 9, 2002	Socorro	LINEAR	H	800 m	MPC · JPL
247392	2002 AX_{33}	—	January 12, 2002	Kitt Peak	Spacewatch	·	3.9 km	MPC · JPL
247393	2002 AO_{66}	—	January 12, 2002	Socorro	LINEAR	·	3.9 km	MPC · JPL
247394	2002 AE_{75}	—	January 8, 2002	Socorro	LINEAR	·	3.5 km	MPC · JPL
247395	2002 AF_{111}	—	January 9, 2002	Socorro	LINEAR	·	4.0 km	MPC · JPL
247396	2002 AO_{139}	—	January 9, 2002	Socorro	LINEAR	EOS	3.3 km	MPC · JPL
247397	2002 AT_{156}	—	January 13, 2002	Socorro	LINEAR	·	4.9 km	MPC · JPL
247398	2002 AF_{164}	—	January 13, 2002	Socorro	LINEAR	·	5.0 km	MPC · JPL
247399	2002 AX_{198}	—	January 8, 2002	Socorro	LINEAR	·	6.5 km	MPC · JPL
247400	2002 AL_{205}	—	January 8, 2002	Apache Point	SDSS	ULA · CYB	8.8 km	MPC · JPL

== 247401–247500 ==
back to top

Designation			Discovery			Properties		Ref
Permanent	Provisional	Named after	Date	Site	Discoverer(s)	Category	Diam.	Ref
247401	2002 AV_{208}	—	January 13, 2002	Socorro	LINEAR	PHO	3.3 km	MPC · JPL
247402	2002 BY_{13}	—	January 19, 2002	Socorro	LINEAR	·	960 m	MPC · JPL
247403	2002 BL_{19}	—	January 21, 2002	Palomar	NEAT	·	2.0 km	MPC · JPL
247404	2002 BV_{21}	—	January 19, 2002	Socorro	LINEAR	·	950 m	MPC · JPL
247405	2002 CU_{1}	—	February 3, 2002	Palomar	NEAT	T_{j} (2.98) · HIL · 3:2	6.4 km	MPC · JPL
247406	2002 CN_{47}	—	February 3, 2002	Haleakala	NEAT	·	6.0 km	MPC · JPL
247407	2002 CT_{51}	—	February 12, 2002	Desert Eagle	W. K. Y. Yeung	·	1.1 km	MPC · JPL
247408	2002 CQ_{75}	—	February 7, 2002	Socorro	LINEAR	·	6.3 km	MPC · JPL
247409	2002 CF_{79}	—	February 7, 2002	Socorro	LINEAR	L4 · ERY	10 km	MPC · JPL
247410	2002 CW_{108}	—	February 7, 2002	Socorro	LINEAR	·	4.0 km	MPC · JPL
247411	2002 CY_{108}	—	February 7, 2002	Socorro	LINEAR	·	1.4 km	MPC · JPL
247412	2002 CU_{120}	—	February 7, 2002	Socorro	LINEAR	·	5.4 km	MPC · JPL
247413	2002 CF_{134}	—	February 7, 2002	Socorro	LINEAR	(5)	2.4 km	MPC · JPL
247414	2002 CF_{150}	—	February 10, 2002	Socorro	LINEAR	·	2.8 km	MPC · JPL
247415	2002 CH_{196}	—	February 10, 2002	Socorro	LINEAR	·	2.2 km	MPC · JPL
247416	2002 CN_{212}	—	February 10, 2002	Socorro	LINEAR	NYS	2.1 km	MPC · JPL
247417	2002 CM_{223}	—	February 11, 2002	Socorro	LINEAR	·	7.4 km	MPC · JPL
247418	2002 CO_{234}	—	February 8, 2002	Kitt Peak	Spacewatch	·	640 m	MPC · JPL
247419	2002 CC_{260}	—	February 7, 2002	Palomar	NEAT	·	4.8 km	MPC · JPL
247420	2002 CZ_{261}	—	February 6, 2002	Kitt Peak	M. W. Buie	·	5.4 km	MPC · JPL
247421	2002 CD_{272}	—	February 8, 2002	Anderson Mesa	LONEOS	L4	20 km	MPC · JPL
247422	2002 CQ_{283}	—	February 9, 2002	Socorro	LINEAR	PHO	3.2 km	MPC · JPL
247423	2002 CW_{287}	—	February 9, 2002	Kitt Peak	Spacewatch	·	5.1 km	MPC · JPL
247424	2002 CD_{288}	—	February 9, 2002	Kitt Peak	Spacewatch	HYG	5.4 km	MPC · JPL
247425	2002 CH_{289}	—	February 10, 2002	Socorro	LINEAR	PHO	3.6 km	MPC · JPL
247426	2002 CT_{289}	—	February 10, 2002	Socorro	LINEAR	·	2.8 km	MPC · JPL
247427	2002 CQ_{291}	—	February 10, 2002	Socorro	LINEAR	·	5.6 km	MPC · JPL
247428	2002 CY_{291}	—	February 11, 2002	Socorro	LINEAR	·	4.1 km	MPC · JPL
247429	2002 CQ_{292}	—	February 11, 2002	Socorro	LINEAR	·	1.4 km	MPC · JPL
247430	2002 CM_{302}	—	February 12, 2002	Socorro	LINEAR	·	3.5 km	MPC · JPL
247431	2002 CK_{304}	—	February 15, 2002	Socorro	LINEAR	PHO	4.1 km	MPC · JPL
247432	2002 CL_{307}	—	February 8, 2002	Socorro	LINEAR	·	1.3 km	MPC · JPL
247433	2002 DX_{2}	—	February 21, 2002	Desert Moon	Stevens, B. L.	·	1.2 km	MPC · JPL
247434	2002 DG_{4}	—	February 21, 2002	Socorro	LINEAR	T_{j} (2.97) · EUP	8.4 km	MPC · JPL
247435	2002 DP_{15}	—	February 16, 2002	Palomar	NEAT	·	2.9 km	MPC · JPL
247436	2002 ES_{3}	—	March 10, 2002	Cima Ekar	ADAS	·	1.4 km	MPC · JPL
247437	2002 EJ_{11}	—	March 12, 2002	Palomar	NEAT	L4	20 km	MPC · JPL
247438	2002 EF_{23}	—	March 5, 2002	Kitt Peak	Spacewatch	EOS	3.7 km	MPC · JPL
247439	2002 EJ_{61}	—	March 13, 2002	Socorro	LINEAR	EOS	4.2 km	MPC · JPL
247440	2002 EP_{73}	—	March 13, 2002	Socorro	LINEAR	MAS	1.1 km	MPC · JPL
247441	2002 EG_{82}	—	March 13, 2002	Palomar	NEAT	·	4.1 km	MPC · JPL
247442	2002 EN_{99}	—	March 2, 2002	Palomar	NEAT	·	2.1 km	MPC · JPL
247443	2002 EZ_{117}	—	March 10, 2002	Kitt Peak	Spacewatch	·	4.1 km	MPC · JPL
247444	2002 ED_{134}	—	March 13, 2002	Palomar	NEAT	·	3.7 km	MPC · JPL
247445	2002 EP_{154}	—	March 13, 2002	Socorro	LINEAR	·	5.3 km	MPC · JPL
247446	2002 FL_{13}	—	March 16, 2002	Socorro	LINEAR	·	2.0 km	MPC · JPL
247447	2002 GE_{19}	—	April 14, 2002	Socorro	LINEAR	·	6.1 km	MPC · JPL
247448	2002 GL_{19}	—	April 14, 2002	Socorro	LINEAR	NYS	1.8 km	MPC · JPL
247449	2002 GF_{36}	—	April 2, 2002	Kitt Peak	Spacewatch	MAS	900 m	MPC · JPL
247450	2002 GW_{36}	—	April 2, 2002	Palomar	NEAT	ADE	3.4 km	MPC · JPL
247451	2002 GP_{37}	—	April 3, 2002	Kitt Peak	Spacewatch	·	1.7 km	MPC · JPL
247452	2002 GK_{41}	—	April 4, 2002	Palomar	NEAT	·	2.5 km	MPC · JPL
247453	2002 GH_{59}	—	April 8, 2002	Palomar	NEAT	MAS	1.1 km	MPC · JPL
247454	2002 GF_{70}	—	April 8, 2002	Palomar	NEAT	·	2.9 km	MPC · JPL
247455	2002 GX_{72}	—	April 9, 2002	Anderson Mesa	LONEOS	·	2.3 km	MPC · JPL
247456	2002 GY_{90}	—	April 8, 2002	Palomar	NEAT	·	1.3 km	MPC · JPL
247457	2002 GA_{98}	—	April 10, 2002	Socorro	LINEAR	·	2.2 km	MPC · JPL
247458	2002 GX_{102}	—	April 10, 2002	Socorro	LINEAR	MIS	2.4 km	MPC · JPL
247459	2002 GA_{116}	—	April 11, 2002	Socorro	LINEAR	·	1.7 km	MPC · JPL
247460	2002 GE_{118}	—	April 12, 2002	Palomar	NEAT	RAF	1.7 km	MPC · JPL
247461	2002 GH_{127}	—	April 12, 2002	Socorro	LINEAR	·	1.4 km	MPC · JPL
247462	2002 GO_{140}	—	April 13, 2002	Kitt Peak	Spacewatch	·	1.2 km	MPC · JPL
247463	2002 GQ_{144}	—	April 11, 2002	Palomar	NEAT	·	1.3 km	MPC · JPL
247464	2002 GF_{167}	—	April 9, 2002	Socorro	LINEAR	CYB	5.1 km	MPC · JPL
247465	2002 HC_{13}	—	April 22, 2002	Socorro	LINEAR	·	4.9 km	MPC · JPL
247466	2002 JG_{6}	—	May 5, 2002	Palomar	NEAT	LUT	7.7 km	MPC · JPL
247467	2002 JZ_{12}	—	May 8, 2002	Desert Eagle	W. K. Y. Yeung	·	4.2 km	MPC · JPL
247468	2002 JE_{17}	—	May 7, 2002	Palomar	NEAT	·	4.5 km	MPC · JPL
247469	2002 JK_{38}	—	May 9, 2002	Palomar	NEAT	·	2.5 km	MPC · JPL
247470	2002 JP_{41}	—	May 8, 2002	Socorro	LINEAR	·	5.8 km	MPC · JPL
247471	2002 JF_{51}	—	May 9, 2002	Socorro	LINEAR	PHO	4.0 km	MPC · JPL
247472	2002 JJ_{61}	—	May 8, 2002	Socorro	LINEAR	·	1.5 km	MPC · JPL
247473	2002 JZ_{67}	—	May 12, 2002	Reedy Creek	J. Broughton	·	1.9 km	MPC · JPL
247474	2002 JL_{81}	—	May 11, 2002	Socorro	LINEAR	·	2.9 km	MPC · JPL
247475	2002 JF_{104}	—	May 10, 2002	Socorro	LINEAR	V	1.0 km	MPC · JPL
247476	2002 JA_{120}	—	May 5, 2002	Palomar	NEAT	·	5.4 km	MPC · JPL
247477	2002 JX_{129}	—	May 8, 2002	Socorro	LINEAR	·	3.2 km	MPC · JPL
247478	2002 JJ_{141}	—	May 10, 2002	Palomar	NEAT	·	2.6 km	MPC · JPL
247479	2002 JO_{142}	—	May 11, 2002	Socorro	LINEAR	·	7.5 km	MPC · JPL
247480	2002 JY_{149}	—	May 9, 2002	Palomar	NEAT	·	1.8 km	MPC · JPL
247481	2002 KG	—	May 16, 2002	Fountain Hills	Hills, Fountain	·	8.3 km	MPC · JPL
247482	2002 KL_{14}	—	May 30, 2002	Palomar	NEAT	·	5.9 km	MPC · JPL
247483	2002 LE_{19}	—	June 6, 2002	Socorro	LINEAR	·	1.3 km	MPC · JPL
247484	2002 LC_{24}	—	June 6, 2002	Socorro	LINEAR	H	1.5 km	MPC · JPL
247485	2002 LO_{35}	—	June 9, 2002	Socorro	LINEAR	·	3.9 km	MPC · JPL
247486	2002 LA_{38}	—	June 3, 2002	Palomar	NEAT	·	1.3 km	MPC · JPL
247487	2002 LJ_{52}	—	June 9, 2002	Socorro	LINEAR	·	6.3 km	MPC · JPL
247488	2002 NL_{19}	—	July 9, 2002	Socorro	LINEAR	·	2.9 km	MPC · JPL
247489	2002 NA_{30}	—	July 5, 2002	Kitt Peak	Spacewatch	·	4.1 km	MPC · JPL
247490	2002 NC_{37}	—	July 9, 2002	Socorro	LINEAR	·	1.4 km	MPC · JPL
247491	2002 NC_{55}	—	July 5, 2002	Palomar	NEAT	·	2.7 km	MPC · JPL
247492	2002 NF_{65}	—	July 14, 2002	Palomar	NEAT	·	2.1 km	MPC · JPL
247493	2002 NW_{69}	—	July 12, 2002	Palomar	NEAT	·	4.1 km	MPC · JPL
247494	2002 NT_{70}	—	July 9, 2002	Palomar	NEAT	·	4.6 km	MPC · JPL
247495	2002 NJ_{72}	—	July 15, 2002	Palomar	NEAT	V	1.3 km	MPC · JPL
247496	2002 OP_{1}	—	July 17, 2002	Socorro	LINEAR	JUN	2.5 km	MPC · JPL
247497	2002 OF_{14}	—	July 18, 2002	Socorro	LINEAR	·	1.3 km	MPC · JPL
247498	2002 OW_{25}	—	July 23, 2002	Palomar	NEAT	·	5.3 km	MPC · JPL
247499	2002 OD_{32}	—	July 18, 2002	Palomar	NEAT	·	3.9 km	MPC · JPL
247500	2002 PH_{34}	—	August 6, 2002	Palomar	NEAT	T_{j} (2.94)	5.0 km	MPC · JPL

== 247501–247600 ==
back to top

Designation			Discovery			Properties		Ref
Permanent	Provisional	Named after	Date	Site	Discoverer(s)	Category	Diam.	Ref
247501	2002 PS_{40}	—	August 4, 2002	Socorro	LINEAR	JUN	2.4 km	MPC · JPL
247502	2002 PK_{43}	—	August 10, 2002	Socorro	LINEAR	H	720 m	MPC · JPL
247503	2002 PV_{60}	—	August 10, 2002	Socorro	LINEAR	EUP	5.6 km	MPC · JPL
247504	2002 PN_{70}	—	August 11, 2002	Socorro	LINEAR	·	1.4 km	MPC · JPL
247505	2002 PB_{89}	—	August 11, 2002	Socorro	LINEAR	·	7.4 km	MPC · JPL
247506	2002 PQ_{91}	—	August 14, 2002	Socorro	LINEAR	·	3.3 km	MPC · JPL
247507	2002 PV_{103}	—	August 12, 2002	Socorro	LINEAR	T_{j} (2.94)	7.1 km	MPC · JPL
247508	2002 PL_{104}	—	August 12, 2002	Socorro	LINEAR	·	6.1 km	MPC · JPL
247509	2002 PN_{119}	—	August 13, 2002	Anderson Mesa	LONEOS	·	3.5 km	MPC · JPL
247510	2002 PN_{121}	—	August 13, 2002	Anderson Mesa	LONEOS	·	5.9 km	MPC · JPL
247511	2002 PZ_{123}	—	August 13, 2002	Socorro	LINEAR	·	4.2 km	MPC · JPL
247512	2002 PW_{124}	—	August 13, 2002	Anderson Mesa	LONEOS	·	4.8 km	MPC · JPL
247513	2002 PX_{132}	—	August 14, 2002	Socorro	LINEAR	·	1.2 km	MPC · JPL
247514	2002 PV_{141}	—	August 8, 2002	Anderson Mesa	LONEOS	BRU	5.2 km	MPC · JPL
247515	2002 PL_{176}	—	August 11, 2002	Palomar	NEAT	·	1.6 km	MPC · JPL
247516	2002 QA	—	August 16, 2002	Socorro	LINEAR	T_{j} (2.99) · EUP	7.7 km	MPC · JPL
247517	2002 QY_{6}	—	August 16, 2002	Socorro	LINEAR	ATE	270 m	MPC · JPL
247518	2002 QU_{15}	—	August 22, 2002	Palomar	NEAT	·	1.9 km	MPC · JPL
247519	2002 QV_{15}	—	August 27, 2002	Socorro	LINEAR	·	4.0 km	MPC · JPL
247520	2002 QX_{19}	—	August 28, 2002	Palomar	NEAT	·	1.8 km	MPC · JPL
247521	2002 QJ_{27}	—	August 28, 2002	Palomar	NEAT	·	4.7 km	MPC · JPL
247522	2002 QA_{64}	—	August 18, 2002	Palomar	NEAT	·	2.7 km	MPC · JPL
247523	2002 QU_{80}	—	August 19, 2002	Palomar	NEAT	·	2.9 km	MPC · JPL
247524	2002 QM_{87}	—	August 30, 2002	Palomar	NEAT	·	3.3 km	MPC · JPL
247525	2002 QQ_{92}	—	August 29, 2002	Palomar	NEAT	·	2.9 km	MPC · JPL
247526	2002 QO_{106}	—	August 17, 2002	Palomar	NEAT	·	3.0 km	MPC · JPL
247527	2002 QX_{113}	—	August 27, 2002	Palomar	NEAT	·	4.2 km	MPC · JPL
247528	2002 QS_{114}	—	August 28, 2002	Palomar	NEAT	·	3.9 km	MPC · JPL
247529	2002 QE_{121}	—	August 16, 2002	Palomar	NEAT	·	3.3 km	MPC · JPL
247530	2002 QL_{123}	—	August 29, 2002	Palomar	NEAT	·	3.1 km	MPC · JPL
247531	2002 RX_{9}	—	September 4, 2002	Palomar	NEAT	·	2.0 km	MPC · JPL
247532	2002 RP_{12}	—	September 4, 2002	Anderson Mesa	LONEOS	·	2.1 km	MPC · JPL
247533	2002 RK_{16}	—	September 4, 2002	Anderson Mesa	LONEOS	HYG	4.6 km	MPC · JPL
247534	2002 RS_{27}	—	September 3, 2002	Needville	J. Dellinger	·	3.2 km	MPC · JPL
247535	2002 RQ_{36}	—	September 5, 2002	Anderson Mesa	LONEOS	·	1.2 km	MPC · JPL
247536	2002 RV_{55}	—	September 5, 2002	Anderson Mesa	LONEOS	(5)	1.6 km	MPC · JPL
247537	2002 RV_{61}	—	September 5, 2002	Socorro	LINEAR	·	5.7 km	MPC · JPL
247538	2002 RF_{66}	—	September 5, 2002	Socorro	LINEAR	·	4.9 km	MPC · JPL
247539	2002 RK_{70}	—	September 4, 2002	Palomar	NEAT	KON	3.0 km	MPC · JPL
247540	2002 RN_{81}	—	September 5, 2002	Socorro	LINEAR	·	3.2 km	MPC · JPL
247541	2002 RO_{110}	—	September 6, 2002	Socorro	LINEAR	·	4.1 km	MPC · JPL
247542 Ripplrónai	2002 RP_{117}	Ripplrónai	September 8, 2002	Piszkéstető	K. Sárneczky	(5)	1.6 km	MPC · JPL
247543	2002 RO_{120}	—	September 5, 2002	Haleakala	NEAT	·	2.1 km	MPC · JPL
247544	2002 RT_{127}	—	September 10, 2002	Palomar	NEAT	·	1.7 km	MPC · JPL
247545	2002 RA_{143}	—	September 11, 2002	Palomar	NEAT	·	3.2 km	MPC · JPL
247546	2002 RY_{171}	—	September 13, 2002	Kitt Peak	Spacewatch	·	3.4 km	MPC · JPL
247547	2002 RV_{180}	—	September 14, 2002	Haleakala	NEAT	·	1.6 km	MPC · JPL
247548	2002 RR_{183}	—	September 11, 2002	Palomar	NEAT	·	7.2 km	MPC · JPL
247549	2002 RS_{201}	—	September 13, 2002	Socorro	LINEAR	·	1.6 km	MPC · JPL
247550	2002 RC_{218}	—	September 14, 2002	Haleakala	NEAT	·	3.6 km	MPC · JPL
247551	2002 RW_{218}	—	September 15, 2002	Palomar	NEAT	·	5.6 km	MPC · JPL
247552	2002 RH_{224}	—	September 13, 2002	Anderson Mesa	LONEOS	·	3.0 km	MPC · JPL
247553 Berndpauli	2002 RV_{234}	Berndpauli	September 8, 2002	Haleakala	R. Matson	HIL · 3:2	6.9 km	MPC · JPL
247554	2002 RE_{242}	—	September 14, 2002	Palomar	R. Matson	·	3.4 km	MPC · JPL
247555	2002 RX_{263}	—	September 5, 2002	Apache Point	SDSS	·	2.3 km	MPC · JPL
247556	2002 RC_{273}	—	September 4, 2002	Palomar	NEAT	·	3.6 km	MPC · JPL
247557	2002 RY_{273}	—	September 4, 2002	Palomar	NEAT	HOF	3.1 km	MPC · JPL
247558	2002 RJ_{279}	—	September 3, 2002	Palomar	NEAT	EMA	4.9 km	MPC · JPL
247559	2002 SE_{4}	—	September 27, 2002	Palomar	NEAT	·	3.8 km	MPC · JPL
247560	2002 SE_{10}	—	September 27, 2002	Palomar	NEAT	·	4.3 km	MPC · JPL
247561	2002 SZ_{11}	—	September 27, 2002	Palomar	NEAT	·	3.2 km	MPC · JPL
247562	2002 SX_{13}	—	September 27, 2002	Palomar	NEAT	URS	5.4 km	MPC · JPL
247563	2002 SY_{24}	—	September 28, 2002	Haleakala	NEAT	HIL · 3:2	7.7 km	MPC · JPL
247564	2002 SQ_{27}	—	September 29, 2002	Haleakala	NEAT	·	1.2 km	MPC · JPL
247565	2002 SE_{32}	—	September 28, 2002	Haleakala	NEAT	·	1.9 km	MPC · JPL
247566	2002 SW_{42}	—	September 28, 2002	Haleakala	NEAT	·	2.0 km	MPC · JPL
247567	2002 SZ_{51}	—	September 17, 2002	Palomar	NEAT	·	6.2 km	MPC · JPL
247568	2002 SR_{53}	—	September 20, 2002	Palomar	NEAT	LUT	6.4 km	MPC · JPL
247569	2002 SZ_{63}	—	September 28, 2002	Palomar	NEAT	H	740 m	MPC · JPL
247570	2002 SJ_{66}	—	September 30, 2002	Haleakala	NEAT	DOR	3.8 km	MPC · JPL
247571	2002 SY_{71}	—	September 30, 2002	Haleakala	NEAT	·	2.0 km	MPC · JPL
247572	2002 SB_{73}	—	September 16, 2002	Palomar	NEAT	·	2.6 km	MPC · JPL
247573	2002 TJ_{2}	—	October 1, 2002	Anderson Mesa	LONEOS	(5)	2.5 km	MPC · JPL
247574	2002 TA_{18}	—	October 2, 2002	Socorro	LINEAR	·	5.6 km	MPC · JPL
247575	2002 TP_{20}	—	October 2, 2002	Socorro	LINEAR	·	4.8 km	MPC · JPL
247576	2002 TL_{27}	—	October 2, 2002	Socorro	LINEAR	·	6.3 km	MPC · JPL
247577	2002 TR_{29}	—	October 2, 2002	Socorro	LINEAR	(5)	1.7 km	MPC · JPL
247578	2002 TC_{31}	—	October 2, 2002	Socorro	LINEAR	·	3.4 km	MPC · JPL
247579	2002 TO_{36}	—	October 2, 2002	Socorro	LINEAR	·	2.1 km	MPC · JPL
247580	2002 TN_{44}	—	October 2, 2002	Socorro	LINEAR	EUN	1.8 km	MPC · JPL
247581	2002 TJ_{46}	—	October 2, 2002	Socorro	LINEAR	·	4.9 km	MPC · JPL
247582	2002 TR_{47}	—	October 2, 2002	Socorro	LINEAR	·	1.5 km	MPC · JPL
247583	2002 TW_{50}	—	October 2, 2002	Socorro	LINEAR	·	2.7 km	MPC · JPL
247584	2002 TY_{56}	—	October 1, 2002	Anderson Mesa	LONEOS	VER	6.4 km	MPC · JPL
247585	2002 TU_{64}	—	October 4, 2002	Socorro	LINEAR	·	4.9 km	MPC · JPL
247586	2002 TA_{85}	—	October 2, 2002	Haleakala	NEAT	(5)	1.5 km	MPC · JPL
247587	2002 TW_{88}	—	October 3, 2002	Palomar	NEAT	·	3.2 km	MPC · JPL
247588	2002 TW_{92}	—	October 2, 2002	Emerald Lane	L. Ball	·	3.7 km	MPC · JPL
247589	2002 TF_{125}	—	October 4, 2002	Palomar	NEAT	·	2.0 km	MPC · JPL
247590	2002 TN_{137}	—	October 4, 2002	Anderson Mesa	LONEOS	·	1.4 km	MPC · JPL
247591	2002 TS_{154}	—	October 5, 2002	Palomar	NEAT	LIX	7.0 km	MPC · JPL
247592	2002 TB_{158}	—	October 5, 2002	Palomar	NEAT	EUN	1.5 km	MPC · JPL
247593	2002 TE_{171}	—	October 3, 2002	Palomar	NEAT	·	3.0 km	MPC · JPL
247594	2002 TL_{177}	—	October 11, 2002	Palomar	NEAT	·	3.3 km	MPC · JPL
247595	2002 TR_{179}	—	October 13, 2002	Palomar	NEAT	EUN	1.7 km	MPC · JPL
247596	2002 TP_{185}	—	October 4, 2002	Socorro	LINEAR	MAR	2.0 km	MPC · JPL
247597	2002 TZ_{185}	—	October 4, 2002	Socorro	LINEAR	·	1.4 km	MPC · JPL
247598	2002 TG_{187}	—	October 4, 2002	Socorro	LINEAR	·	2.0 km	MPC · JPL
247599	2002 TL_{190}	—	October 11, 2002	Powell	Powell	·	2.2 km	MPC · JPL
247600	2002 TT_{198}	—	October 5, 2002	Anderson Mesa	LONEOS	(5931)	6.7 km	MPC · JPL

== 247601–247700 ==
back to top

Designation			Discovery			Properties		Ref
Permanent	Provisional	Named after	Date	Site	Discoverer(s)	Category	Diam.	Ref
247601	2002 TW_{212}	—	October 7, 2002	Haleakala	NEAT	·	3.6 km	MPC · JPL
247602	2002 TY_{225}	—	October 8, 2002	Haleakala	NEAT	·	3.5 km	MPC · JPL
247603	2002 TZ_{231}	—	October 6, 2002	Socorro	LINEAR	EUN	1.7 km	MPC · JPL
247604	2002 TX_{237}	—	October 7, 2002	Socorro	LINEAR	(194)	2.7 km	MPC · JPL
247605	2002 TP_{254}	—	October 9, 2002	Anderson Mesa	LONEOS	(5)	1.4 km	MPC · JPL
247606	2002 TO_{267}	—	October 8, 2002	Anderson Mesa	LONEOS	·	2.3 km	MPC · JPL
247607	2002 TP_{268}	—	October 9, 2002	Socorro	LINEAR	·	1.5 km	MPC · JPL
247608	2002 TZ_{272}	—	October 9, 2002	Socorro	LINEAR	KON	3.3 km	MPC · JPL
247609	2002 TK_{277}	—	October 10, 2002	Palomar	NEAT	·	4.7 km	MPC · JPL
247610	2002 TQ_{281}	—	October 10, 2002	Socorro	LINEAR	·	2.9 km	MPC · JPL
247611	2002 TH_{288}	—	October 10, 2002	Socorro	LINEAR	·	5.5 km	MPC · JPL
247612	2002 TC_{289}	—	October 10, 2002	Socorro	LINEAR	·	2.8 km	MPC · JPL
247613	2002 TS_{290}	—	October 10, 2002	Socorro	LINEAR	·	3.5 km	MPC · JPL
247614	2002 TT_{290}	—	October 10, 2002	Socorro	LINEAR	·	2.4 km	MPC · JPL
247615	2002 TP_{292}	—	October 10, 2002	Socorro	LINEAR	·	2.6 km	MPC · JPL
247616	2002 TF_{300}	—	October 15, 2002	Socorro	LINEAR	H	980 m	MPC · JPL
247617	2002 TP_{303}	—	October 5, 2002	Palomar	K. Černis	EUP	5.0 km	MPC · JPL
247618	2002 TH_{309}	—	October 4, 2002	Apache Point	SDSS	·	4.6 km	MPC · JPL
247619	2002 TC_{312}	—	October 4, 2002	Apache Point	SDSS	·	3.2 km	MPC · JPL
247620	2002 TX_{318}	—	October 5, 2002	Apache Point	SDSS	·	4.0 km	MPC · JPL
247621	2002 TQ_{325}	—	October 5, 2002	Apache Point	SDSS	·	3.5 km	MPC · JPL
247622	2002 TH_{367}	—	October 10, 2002	Apache Point	SDSS	·	1.5 km	MPC · JPL
247623	2002 TS_{376}	—	October 5, 2002	Palomar	NEAT	·	2.2 km	MPC · JPL
247624	2002 TD_{384}	—	October 15, 2002	Palomar	NEAT	·	1.7 km	MPC · JPL
247625	2002 UT_{2}	—	October 28, 2002	Socorro	LINEAR	·	7.0 km	MPC · JPL
247626	2002 UV_{5}	—	October 28, 2002	Socorro	LINEAR	T_{j} (2.97)	5.2 km	MPC · JPL
247627	2002 UF_{23}	—	October 31, 2002	Palomar	NEAT	·	2.8 km	MPC · JPL
247628	2002 US_{24}	—	October 29, 2002	Kitt Peak	Spacewatch	·	4.0 km	MPC · JPL
247629	2002 UM_{25}	—	October 30, 2002	Haleakala	NEAT	·	3.1 km	MPC · JPL
247630	2002 UL_{28}	—	October 30, 2002	Palomar	NEAT	·	3.3 km	MPC · JPL
247631	2002 UC_{47}	—	October 31, 2002	Socorro	LINEAR	·	1.9 km	MPC · JPL
247632	2002 UA_{71}	—	October 30, 2002	Palomar	NEAT	·	5.9 km	MPC · JPL
247633	2002 VY_{4}	—	November 4, 2002	Kitt Peak	Spacewatch	·	5.5 km	MPC · JPL
247634	2002 VM_{12}	—	November 4, 2002	Anderson Mesa	LONEOS	·	2.5 km	MPC · JPL
247635	2002 VS_{29}	—	November 5, 2002	Socorro	LINEAR	·	1.5 km	MPC · JPL
247636	2002 VV_{39}	—	November 5, 2002	Socorro	LINEAR	THB	7.3 km	MPC · JPL
247637	2002 VZ_{40}	—	November 1, 2002	Palomar	NEAT	·	4.2 km	MPC · JPL
247638	2002 VP_{44}	—	November 4, 2002	Haleakala	NEAT	·	2.0 km	MPC · JPL
247639	2002 VV_{55}	—	November 6, 2002	Socorro	LINEAR	·	1.4 km	MPC · JPL
247640	2002 VM_{65}	—	November 7, 2002	Socorro	LINEAR	EUN	1.7 km	MPC · JPL
247641	2002 VZ_{76}	—	November 7, 2002	Socorro	LINEAR	·	5.6 km	MPC · JPL
247642	2002 VH_{92}	—	November 11, 2002	Socorro	LINEAR	T_{j} (2.99) · EUP	4.9 km	MPC · JPL
247643	2002 VQ_{114}	—	November 13, 2002	Palomar	NEAT	LIX	6.4 km	MPC · JPL
247644	2002 VF_{120}	—	November 12, 2002	Socorro	LINEAR	·	2.1 km	MPC · JPL
247645	2002 VA_{123}	—	November 13, 2002	Palomar	NEAT	·	5.2 km	MPC · JPL
247646	2002 VJ_{131}	—	November 13, 2002	Kingsnake	J. V. McClusky	·	1.9 km	MPC · JPL
247647	2002 VX_{132}	—	November 1, 2002	Socorro	LINEAR	·	1.7 km	MPC · JPL
247648	2002 VG_{135}	—	November 7, 2002	Socorro	LINEAR	·	1.8 km	MPC · JPL
247649	2002 WG_{5}	—	November 24, 2002	Palomar	NEAT	·	1.8 km	MPC · JPL
247650	2002 WK_{6}	—	November 24, 2002	Palomar	NEAT	(5)	2.7 km	MPC · JPL
247651	2002 WK_{15}	—	November 28, 2002	Anderson Mesa	LONEOS	slow	5.3 km	MPC · JPL
247652 Hajossy	2002 WO_{21}	Hajossy	November 26, 2002	Palomar	NEAT	·	2.0 km	MPC · JPL
247653	2002 WE_{28}	—	November 24, 2002	Palomar	NEAT	L5	11 km	MPC · JPL
247654	2002 XS_{10}	—	December 3, 2002	Palomar	NEAT	·	2.6 km	MPC · JPL
247655	2002 XV_{19}	—	December 2, 2002	Socorro	LINEAR	·	7.0 km	MPC · JPL
247656	2002 XX_{26}	—	December 5, 2002	Anderson Mesa	LONEOS	·	2.6 km	MPC · JPL
247657	2002 XW_{52}	—	December 10, 2002	Socorro	LINEAR	(5)	2.9 km	MPC · JPL
247658	2002 XN_{63}	—	December 11, 2002	Socorro	LINEAR	·	1.4 km	MPC · JPL
247659	2002 XY_{64}	—	December 11, 2002	Socorro	LINEAR	·	3.2 km	MPC · JPL
247660	2002 XC_{67}	—	December 11, 2002	Desert Eagle	W. K. Y. Yeung	·	3.3 km	MPC · JPL
247661	2002 XF_{69}	—	December 13, 2002	Socorro	LINEAR	·	5.1 km	MPC · JPL
247662	2002 XU_{77}	—	December 11, 2002	Socorro	LINEAR	EUN	3.4 km	MPC · JPL
247663	2002 XO_{83}	—	December 13, 2002	Socorro	LINEAR	·	1.4 km	MPC · JPL
247664	2002 XU_{83}	—	December 13, 2002	Palomar	NEAT	·	3.3 km	MPC · JPL
247665	2002 XY_{89}	—	December 14, 2002	Socorro	LINEAR	·	1.5 km	MPC · JPL
247666	2002 XT_{92}	—	December 5, 2002	Kitt Peak	M. W. Buie	·	2.0 km	MPC · JPL
247667	2002 XS_{99}	—	December 5, 2002	Socorro	LINEAR	·	4.7 km	MPC · JPL
247668	2002 XE_{103}	—	December 5, 2002	Socorro	LINEAR	·	4.9 km	MPC · JPL
247669	2002 XO_{110}	—	December 6, 2002	Socorro	LINEAR	·	5.1 km	MPC · JPL
247670	2002 XE_{118}	—	December 3, 2002	Palomar	NEAT	·	4.3 km	MPC · JPL
247671	2002 YM_{10}	—	December 31, 2002	Socorro	LINEAR	·	2.0 km	MPC · JPL
247672	2002 YD_{11}	—	December 31, 2002	Kitt Peak	Spacewatch	·	5.2 km	MPC · JPL
247673	2002 YS_{14}	—	December 31, 2002	Kitt Peak	Spacewatch	·	6.1 km	MPC · JPL
247674	2002 YM_{19}	—	December 31, 2002	Socorro	LINEAR	·	3.0 km	MPC · JPL
247675	2002 YP_{28}	—	December 31, 2002	Socorro	LINEAR	·	2.3 km	MPC · JPL
247676	2002 YW_{31}	—	December 31, 2002	Socorro	LINEAR	·	6.5 km	MPC · JPL
247677	2002 YA_{32}	—	December 31, 2002	Kitt Peak	Spacewatch	·	6.4 km	MPC · JPL
247678	2003 AS_{1}	—	January 2, 2003	Socorro	LINEAR	·	2.7 km	MPC · JPL
247679	2003 AR_{4}	—	January 1, 2003	Kingsnake	J. V. McClusky	·	6.8 km	MPC · JPL
247680	2003 AJ_{5}	—	January 1, 2003	Socorro	LINEAR	·	3.4 km	MPC · JPL
247681	2003 AU_{12}	—	January 1, 2003	Socorro	LINEAR	EUN	2.1 km	MPC · JPL
247682	2003 AU_{41}	—	January 7, 2003	Socorro	LINEAR	·	3.7 km	MPC · JPL
247683	2003 AE_{47}	—	January 5, 2003	Socorro	LINEAR	·	1.4 km	MPC · JPL
247684	2003 AN_{64}	—	January 7, 2003	Socorro	LINEAR	LIX	6.0 km	MPC · JPL
247685	2003 AF_{67}	—	January 7, 2003	Socorro	LINEAR	·	2.6 km	MPC · JPL
247686	2003 AY_{73}	—	January 10, 2003	Socorro	LINEAR	·	3.9 km	MPC · JPL
247687	2003 AO_{75}	—	January 10, 2003	Socorro	LINEAR	·	4.7 km	MPC · JPL
247688	2003 BQ_{7}	—	January 26, 2003	Kitt Peak	Spacewatch	·	1.3 km	MPC · JPL
247689	2003 BM_{18}	—	January 27, 2003	Anderson Mesa	LONEOS	·	6.0 km	MPC · JPL
247690	2003 BA_{25}	—	January 25, 2003	Palomar	NEAT	JUN	1.6 km	MPC · JPL
247691	2003 BU_{27}	—	January 26, 2003	Anderson Mesa	LONEOS	·	6.2 km	MPC · JPL
247692	2003 BW_{29}	—	January 27, 2003	Socorro	LINEAR	·	2.1 km	MPC · JPL
247693	2003 BU_{31}	—	January 27, 2003	Socorro	LINEAR	·	2.5 km	MPC · JPL
247694	2003 BF_{36}	—	January 26, 2003	Kitt Peak	Spacewatch	·	3.7 km	MPC · JPL
247695	2003 BE_{37}	—	January 28, 2003	Kitt Peak	Spacewatch	·	4.5 km	MPC · JPL
247696	2003 BJ_{43}	—	January 27, 2003	Socorro	LINEAR	·	6.9 km	MPC · JPL
247697	2003 BE_{51}	—	January 27, 2003	Socorro	LINEAR	·	4.3 km	MPC · JPL
247698	2003 BZ_{51}	—	January 27, 2003	Socorro	LINEAR	·	2.7 km	MPC · JPL
247699	2003 BC_{74}	—	January 29, 2003	Palomar	NEAT	·	2.6 km	MPC · JPL
247700	2003 BC_{86}	—	January 23, 2003	Kitt Peak	Spacewatch	NYS	1.6 km	MPC · JPL

== 247701–247800 ==
back to top

Designation			Discovery			Properties		Ref
Permanent	Provisional	Named after	Date	Site	Discoverer(s)	Category	Diam.	Ref
247701	2003 CS_{4}	—	February 1, 2003	Socorro	LINEAR	EUP	5.3 km	MPC · JPL
247702	2003 CC_{7}	—	February 1, 2003	Socorro	LINEAR	·	5.1 km	MPC · JPL
247703	2003 CF_{8}	—	February 1, 2003	Socorro	LINEAR	·	6.3 km	MPC · JPL
247704	2003 CT_{9}	—	February 2, 2003	Socorro	LINEAR	·	2.7 km	MPC · JPL
247705	2003 CF_{24}	—	February 4, 2003	La Silla	Barbieri, C.	HOF	3.4 km	MPC · JPL
247706	2003 DJ_{4}	—	February 21, 2003	Palomar	NEAT	·	3.6 km	MPC · JPL
247707	2003 DA_{7}	—	February 23, 2003	Campo Imperatore	CINEOS	·	5.0 km	MPC · JPL
247708	2003 DT_{14}	—	February 25, 2003	Campo Imperatore	CINEOS	·	4.8 km	MPC · JPL
247709	2003 EV_{1}	—	March 4, 2003	St. Véran	St. Veran	EOS	5.0 km	MPC · JPL
247710	2003 EV_{10}	—	March 6, 2003	Socorro	LINEAR	·	6.3 km	MPC · JPL
247711	2003 EU_{31}	—	March 7, 2003	Socorro	LINEAR	·	2.1 km	MPC · JPL
247712	2003 EE_{39}	—	March 8, 2003	Socorro	LINEAR	T_{j} (2.95)	7.0 km	MPC · JPL
247713	2003 EA_{57}	—	March 9, 2003	Palomar	NEAT	·	3.7 km	MPC · JPL
247714	2003 EA_{58}	—	March 9, 2003	Socorro	LINEAR	·	5.9 km	MPC · JPL
247715	2003 FT_{1}	—	March 24, 2003	Črni Vrh	Mikuž, H.	·	4.1 km	MPC · JPL
247716	2003 FW_{17}	—	March 24, 2003	Kitt Peak	Spacewatch	·	3.4 km	MPC · JPL
247717	2003 FA_{20}	—	March 23, 2003	Palomar	NEAT	·	5.3 km	MPC · JPL
247718	2003 FT_{22}	—	March 26, 2003	Socorro	LINEAR	EUP	6.8 km	MPC · JPL
247719	2003 FD_{43}	—	March 23, 2003	Kitt Peak	Spacewatch	HNS	2.5 km	MPC · JPL
247720	2003 FS_{74}	—	March 26, 2003	Palomar	NEAT	TIR ·	4.8 km	MPC · JPL
247721	2003 FX_{83}	—	March 28, 2003	Campo Imperatore	CINEOS	·	2.3 km	MPC · JPL
247722	2003 FX_{89}	—	March 29, 2003	Anderson Mesa	LONEOS	·	4.5 km	MPC · JPL
247723	2003 FW_{90}	—	March 29, 2003	Anderson Mesa	LONEOS	·	6.2 km	MPC · JPL
247724	2003 FM_{98}	—	March 30, 2003	Kitt Peak	Spacewatch	·	5.0 km	MPC · JPL
247725	2003 FC_{123}	—	March 26, 2003	Kitt Peak	Spacewatch	DOR	4.4 km	MPC · JPL
247726	2003 FM_{131}	—	March 26, 2003	Kitt Peak	Spacewatch	·	5.0 km	MPC · JPL
247727	2003 GC_{21}	—	April 4, 2003	Uccle	Uccle	·	5.6 km	MPC · JPL
247728	2003 GX_{23}	—	April 6, 2003	Kitt Peak	Spacewatch	ERI	2.3 km	MPC · JPL
247729	2003 GG_{30}	—	April 7, 2003	Kitt Peak	Spacewatch	·	810 m	MPC · JPL
247730	2003 GK_{51}	—	April 7, 2003	Bergisch Gladbach	W. Bickel	·	5.6 km	MPC · JPL
247731	2003 HN_{6}	—	April 25, 2003	Kitt Peak	Spacewatch	·	1.7 km	MPC · JPL
247732	2003 HZ_{18}	—	April 25, 2003	Kitt Peak	Spacewatch	·	5.8 km	MPC · JPL
247733	2003 HW_{19}	—	April 26, 2003	Haleakala	NEAT	·	1.0 km	MPC · JPL
247734	2003 HD_{27}	—	April 27, 2003	Anderson Mesa	LONEOS	·	5.1 km	MPC · JPL
247735	2003 HY_{37}	—	April 28, 2003	Anderson Mesa	LONEOS	·	2.4 km	MPC · JPL
247736	2003 HP_{51}	—	April 30, 2003	Socorro	LINEAR	·	4.7 km	MPC · JPL
247737	2003 JD_{10}	—	May 1, 2003	Socorro	LINEAR	·	4.1 km	MPC · JPL
247738	2003 KX_{1}	—	May 22, 2003	Kitt Peak	Spacewatch	EOS	3.5 km	MPC · JPL
247739	2003 KZ_{34}	—	May 29, 2003	Socorro	LINEAR	·	1.4 km	MPC · JPL
247740	2003 LY_{3}	—	June 5, 2003	Reedy Creek	J. Broughton	·	2.3 km	MPC · JPL
247741	2003 LM_{5}	—	June 5, 2003	Kitt Peak	Spacewatch	·	1.0 km	MPC · JPL
247742	2003 LJ_{6}	—	June 8, 2003	Siding Spring	R. H. McNaught	·	2.5 km	MPC · JPL
247743	2003 MX_{7}	—	June 28, 2003	Socorro	LINEAR	·	1.7 km	MPC · JPL
247744	2003 ME_{9}	—	June 28, 2003	Socorro	LINEAR	·	4.8 km	MPC · JPL
247745	2003 NX_{8}	—	July 4, 2003	Anderson Mesa	LONEOS	·	1.3 km	MPC · JPL
247746	2003 NK_{10}	—	July 3, 2003	Kitt Peak	Spacewatch	·	3.2 km	MPC · JPL
247747	2003 OT_{10}	—	July 27, 2003	Reedy Creek	J. Broughton	·	2.9 km	MPC · JPL
247748	2003 OL_{16}	—	July 27, 2003	Socorro	LINEAR	·	2.6 km	MPC · JPL
247749	2003 OT_{18}	—	July 28, 2003	Haleakala	NEAT	·	2.7 km	MPC · JPL
247750	2003 OW_{21}	—	July 29, 2003	Socorro	LINEAR	T_{j} (2.99)	6.4 km	MPC · JPL
247751	2003 OG_{24}	—	July 24, 2003	Palomar	NEAT	·	1.1 km	MPC · JPL
247752	2003 OE_{31}	—	July 30, 2003	Socorro	LINEAR	·	1.6 km	MPC · JPL
247753	2003 PE	—	August 1, 2003	Reedy Creek	J. Broughton	·	1.2 km	MPC · JPL
247754	2003 PU	—	August 1, 2003	Socorro	LINEAR	PHO	3.8 km	MPC · JPL
247755	2003 PA_{1}	—	August 1, 2003	Socorro	LINEAR	·	4.8 km	MPC · JPL
247756	2003 PH_{5}	—	August 4, 2003	Socorro	LINEAR	ERI	1.3 km	MPC · JPL
247757	2003 PM_{8}	—	August 3, 2003	Črni Vrh	J. Skvarč, H. Mikuž	·	1.1 km	MPC · JPL
247758	2003 QH_{4}	—	August 18, 2003	Campo Imperatore	CINEOS	·	1.2 km	MPC · JPL
247759	2003 QE_{5}	—	August 21, 2003	Campo Imperatore	CINEOS	·	2.6 km	MPC · JPL
247760	2003 QN_{5}	—	August 21, 2003	Socorro	LINEAR	·	2.1 km	MPC · JPL
247761	2003 QC_{11}	—	August 20, 2003	Črni Vrh	Mikuž, H.	·	4.1 km	MPC · JPL
247762	2003 QF_{15}	—	August 20, 2003	Palomar	NEAT	·	6.1 km	MPC · JPL
247763	2003 QX_{17}	—	August 22, 2003	Palomar	NEAT	CYB	7.5 km	MPC · JPL
247764	2003 QL_{26}	—	August 22, 2003	Haleakala	NEAT	·	900 m	MPC · JPL
247765	2003 QU_{40}	—	August 22, 2003	Socorro	LINEAR	V	1 km	MPC · JPL
247766	2003 QJ_{52}	—	August 23, 2003	Socorro	LINEAR	·	1.2 km	MPC · JPL
247767	2003 QN_{52}	—	August 23, 2003	Socorro	LINEAR	·	3.7 km	MPC · JPL
247768	2003 QB_{54}	—	August 23, 2003	Socorro	LINEAR	NYS	1.3 km	MPC · JPL
247769	2003 QE_{66}	—	August 22, 2003	Palomar	NEAT	·	2.1 km	MPC · JPL
247770	2003 QA_{74}	—	August 24, 2003	Socorro	LINEAR	(2076)	1.2 km	MPC · JPL
247771	2003 QO_{87}	—	August 25, 2003	Socorro	LINEAR	·	1.5 km	MPC · JPL
247772	2003 QM_{90}	—	August 28, 2003	Socorro	LINEAR	·	1.7 km	MPC · JPL
247773	2003 QM_{100}	—	August 28, 2003	Palomar	NEAT	·	1.4 km	MPC · JPL
247774	2003 QZ_{101}	—	August 30, 2003	Kitt Peak	Spacewatch	·	2.9 km	MPC · JPL
247775	2003 QW_{105}	—	August 30, 2003	Kitt Peak	Spacewatch	PHO	1.7 km	MPC · JPL
247776	2003 QL_{107}	—	August 31, 2003	Socorro	LINEAR	·	2.8 km	MPC · JPL
247777	2003 QR_{110}	—	August 31, 2003	Socorro	LINEAR	·	2.1 km	MPC · JPL
247778	2003 RF	—	September 1, 2003	Socorro	LINEAR	PHO	2.4 km	MPC · JPL
247779	2003 RU	—	September 2, 2003	Haleakala	NEAT	·	1.1 km	MPC · JPL
247780	2003 RA_{1}	—	September 1, 2003	Socorro	LINEAR	·	2.1 km	MPC · JPL
247781	2003 RQ_{4}	—	September 3, 2003	Socorro	LINEAR	V	1.0 km	MPC · JPL
247782	2003 RZ_{7}	—	September 3, 2003	Socorro	LINEAR	V	830 m	MPC · JPL
247783	2003 RE_{11}	—	September 13, 2003	Haleakala	NEAT	·	1.4 km	MPC · JPL
247784	2003 RR_{13}	—	September 15, 2003	Haleakala	NEAT	EUP	6.8 km	MPC · JPL
247785	2003 RK_{17}	—	September 15, 2003	Palomar	NEAT	·	4.6 km	MPC · JPL
247786	2003 SR_{8}	—	September 16, 2003	Kitt Peak	Spacewatch	·	2.5 km	MPC · JPL
247787	2003 SL_{13}	—	September 16, 2003	Kitt Peak	Spacewatch	·	2.6 km	MPC · JPL
247788	2003 SE_{28}	—	September 18, 2003	Palomar	NEAT	·	3.7 km	MPC · JPL
247789	2003 SL_{38}	—	September 16, 2003	Palomar	NEAT	·	1.4 km	MPC · JPL
247790	2003 SZ_{38}	—	September 16, 2003	Palomar	NEAT	KON	4.2 km	MPC · JPL
247791	2003 SK_{39}	—	September 16, 2003	Palomar	NEAT	NYS	1.2 km	MPC · JPL
247792	2003 SM_{40}	—	September 16, 2003	Palomar	NEAT	·	1.8 km	MPC · JPL
247793	2003 SR_{43}	—	September 16, 2003	Anderson Mesa	LONEOS	·	1.8 km	MPC · JPL
247794	2003 SR_{46}	—	September 16, 2003	Anderson Mesa	LONEOS	·	1.2 km	MPC · JPL
247795	2003 SX_{54}	—	September 16, 2003	Anderson Mesa	LONEOS	(2076)	1.6 km	MPC · JPL
247796	2003 SL_{59}	—	September 17, 2003	Anderson Mesa	LONEOS	PHO	2.5 km	MPC · JPL
247797	2003 SN_{60}	—	September 17, 2003	Kitt Peak	Spacewatch	·	2.4 km	MPC · JPL
247798	2003 SR_{60}	—	September 17, 2003	Kitt Peak	Spacewatch	·	2.1 km	MPC · JPL
247799	2003 SR_{69}	—	September 17, 2003	Kitt Peak	Spacewatch	·	4.3 km	MPC · JPL
247800	2003 SF_{72}	—	September 18, 2003	Kitt Peak	Spacewatch	HOF	3.6 km	MPC · JPL

== 247801–247900 ==
back to top

Designation			Discovery			Properties		Ref
Permanent	Provisional	Named after	Date	Site	Discoverer(s)	Category	Diam.	Ref
247801	2003 SF_{74}	—	September 18, 2003	Kitt Peak	Spacewatch	·	3.9 km	MPC · JPL
247802	2003 SD_{76}	—	September 18, 2003	Kitt Peak	Spacewatch	·	4.2 km	MPC · JPL
247803	2003 SD_{89}	—	September 18, 2003	Socorro	LINEAR	·	1.0 km	MPC · JPL
247804	2003 SS_{90}	—	September 18, 2003	Socorro	LINEAR	·	1.2 km	MPC · JPL
247805	2003 SF_{96}	—	September 19, 2003	Socorro	LINEAR	·	1.7 km	MPC · JPL
247806	2003 SV_{105}	—	September 20, 2003	Palomar	NEAT	·	2.6 km	MPC · JPL
247807	2003 SD_{110}	—	September 20, 2003	Palomar	NEAT	·	1.6 km	MPC · JPL
247808	2003 SS_{110}	—	September 20, 2003	Palomar	NEAT	·	1.5 km	MPC · JPL
247809	2003 SN_{111}	—	September 19, 2003	Haleakala	NEAT	PHO	3.3 km	MPC · JPL
247810	2003 SE_{117}	—	September 16, 2003	Kitt Peak	Spacewatch	·	3.1 km	MPC · JPL
247811	2003 SY_{121}	—	September 17, 2003	Campo Imperatore	CINEOS	V	710 m	MPC · JPL
247812	2003 SB_{124}	—	September 18, 2003	Goodricke-Pigott	R. A. Tucker	·	1.9 km	MPC · JPL
247813	2003 SW_{137}	—	September 21, 2003	Socorro	LINEAR	·	2.2 km	MPC · JPL
247814	2003 SF_{141}	—	September 19, 2003	Haleakala	NEAT	TIR	2.5 km	MPC · JPL
247815	2003 SS_{142}	—	September 20, 2003	Socorro	LINEAR	·	1.6 km	MPC · JPL
247816	2003 SQ_{144}	—	September 19, 2003	Palomar	NEAT	·	2.0 km	MPC · JPL
247817	2003 SF_{147}	—	September 20, 2003	Palomar	NEAT	·	3.9 km	MPC · JPL
247818	2003 SX_{150}	—	September 17, 2003	Socorro	LINEAR	V	3.0 km	MPC · JPL
247819	2003 SM_{154}	—	September 19, 2003	Anderson Mesa	LONEOS	V	1.2 km	MPC · JPL
247820	2003 SC_{156}	—	September 19, 2003	Anderson Mesa	LONEOS	·	3.9 km	MPC · JPL
247821 Coignet	2003 SN_{170}	Coignet	September 22, 2003	Uccle	T. Pauwels	·	5.7 km	MPC · JPL
247822	2003 SH_{180}	—	September 19, 2003	Haleakala	NEAT	·	970 m	MPC · JPL
247823	2003 SG_{185}	—	September 21, 2003	Haleakala	NEAT	SYL · CYB	7.1 km	MPC · JPL
247824	2003 SD_{187}	—	September 22, 2003	Anderson Mesa	LONEOS	·	4.2 km	MPC · JPL
247825	2003 SF_{190}	—	September 24, 2003	Palomar	NEAT	·	1.3 km	MPC · JPL
247826	2003 SC_{193}	—	September 20, 2003	Palomar	NEAT	·	4.6 km	MPC · JPL
247827	2003 SN_{198}	—	September 21, 2003	Anderson Mesa	LONEOS	fast?	1.4 km	MPC · JPL
247828	2003 SD_{208}	—	September 23, 2003	Palomar	NEAT	·	1.1 km	MPC · JPL
247829	2003 SQ_{217}	—	September 27, 2003	Desert Eagle	W. K. Y. Yeung	ERI	2.3 km	MPC · JPL
247830	2003 SG_{218}	—	September 27, 2003	Kitt Peak	Spacewatch	HOF	3.4 km	MPC · JPL
247831	2003 SP_{232}	—	September 24, 2003	Haleakala	NEAT	NYS	1.9 km	MPC · JPL
247832	2003 SW_{245}	—	September 26, 2003	Socorro	LINEAR	·	3.6 km	MPC · JPL
247833	2003 SO_{251}	—	September 26, 2003	Socorro	LINEAR	·	4.2 km	MPC · JPL
247834	2003 SF_{254}	—	September 27, 2003	Kitt Peak	Spacewatch	KON	4.5 km	MPC · JPL
247835	2003 ST_{255}	—	September 27, 2003	Kitt Peak	Spacewatch	·	1.4 km	MPC · JPL
247836	2003 SA_{258}	—	September 28, 2003	Socorro	LINEAR	·	2.3 km	MPC · JPL
247837	2003 SV_{266}	—	September 29, 2003	Socorro	LINEAR	·	1.6 km	MPC · JPL
247838	2003 SF_{275}	—	September 29, 2003	Socorro	LINEAR	·	1.5 km	MPC · JPL
247839	2003 SJ_{280}	—	September 18, 2003	Socorro	LINEAR	·	1.5 km	MPC · JPL
247840	2003 SK_{282}	—	September 19, 2003	Anderson Mesa	LONEOS	·	1.4 km	MPC · JPL
247841	2003 SQ_{283}	—	September 20, 2003	Socorro	LINEAR	TIR	2.6 km	MPC · JPL
247842	2003 SM_{292}	—	September 25, 2003	Palomar	NEAT	·	3.4 km	MPC · JPL
247843	2003 ST_{318}	—	September 18, 2003	Kitt Peak	Spacewatch	V	850 m	MPC · JPL
247844	2003 SZ_{318}	—	September 19, 2003	Anderson Mesa	LONEOS	NYS ·	2.4 km	MPC · JPL
247845	2003 SA_{322}	—	September 26, 2003	Apache Point	SDSS	·	2.2 km	MPC · JPL
247846	2003 SS_{350}	—	September 19, 2003	Kitt Peak	Spacewatch	·	3.6 km	MPC · JPL
247847	2003 SH_{352}	—	September 19, 2003	Kitt Peak	Spacewatch	NYS	1.1 km	MPC · JPL
247848	2003 SF_{369}	—	September 26, 2003	Apache Point	SDSS	·	1.2 km	MPC · JPL
247849	2003 SX_{412}	—	September 28, 2003	Kitt Peak	Spacewatch	·	2.2 km	MPC · JPL
247850	2003 SX_{418}	—	September 28, 2003	Apache Point	SDSS	·	2.4 km	MPC · JPL
247851	2003 TY_{5}	—	October 3, 2003	Kitt Peak	Spacewatch	·	1.5 km	MPC · JPL
247852	2003 TY_{11}	—	October 14, 2003	Anderson Mesa	LONEOS	·	3.2 km	MPC · JPL
247853	2003 TN_{18}	—	October 15, 2003	Anderson Mesa	LONEOS	·	1.5 km	MPC · JPL
247854	2003 TV_{19}	—	October 15, 2003	Anderson Mesa	LONEOS	T_{j} (2.99) · 3:2	6.9 km	MPC · JPL
247855	2003 UC_{4}	—	October 16, 2003	Palomar	NEAT	·	2.5 km	MPC · JPL
247856	2003 UR_{7}	—	October 18, 2003	Kingsnake	J. V. McClusky	·	6.3 km	MPC · JPL
247857	2003 UN_{36}	—	October 16, 2003	Palomar	NEAT	·	3.0 km	MPC · JPL
247858	2003 UA_{38}	—	October 17, 2003	Socorro	LINEAR	·	1.2 km	MPC · JPL
247859	2003 UJ_{47}	—	October 20, 2003	Goodricke-Pigott	R. A. Tucker	·	1.9 km	MPC · JPL
247860	2003 UM_{47}	—	October 20, 2003	Goodricke-Pigott	R. A. Tucker	·	2.7 km	MPC · JPL
247861	2003 UB_{53}	—	October 18, 2003	Palomar	NEAT	·	2.6 km	MPC · JPL
247862	2003 UL_{55}	—	October 18, 2003	Palomar	NEAT	·	1.5 km	MPC · JPL
247863	2003 UQ_{74}	—	October 17, 2003	Kitt Peak	Spacewatch	·	4.5 km	MPC · JPL
247864	2003 UC_{76}	—	October 17, 2003	Kitt Peak	Spacewatch	·	4.6 km	MPC · JPL
247865	2003 UD_{80}	—	October 17, 2003	Goodricke-Pigott	R. A. Tucker	·	1.6 km	MPC · JPL
247866	2003 UH_{82}	—	October 19, 2003	Kitt Peak	Spacewatch	·	1.8 km	MPC · JPL
247867	2003 UU_{94}	—	October 18, 2003	Kitt Peak	Spacewatch	·	1.2 km	MPC · JPL
247868	2003 UY_{98}	—	October 19, 2003	Kitt Peak	Spacewatch	PHO	4.4 km	MPC · JPL
247869	2003 UW_{108}	—	October 19, 2003	Kitt Peak	Spacewatch	·	3.1 km	MPC · JPL
247870	2003 UU_{110}	—	October 19, 2003	Kitt Peak	Spacewatch	·	3.6 km	MPC · JPL
247871	2003 UA_{121}	—	October 18, 2003	Kitt Peak	Spacewatch	NYS	1.3 km	MPC · JPL
247872	2003 UH_{135}	—	October 21, 2003	Anderson Mesa	LONEOS	·	5.3 km	MPC · JPL
247873	2003 UH_{141}	—	October 18, 2003	Anderson Mesa	LONEOS	·	1.2 km	MPC · JPL
247874	2003 UJ_{145}	—	October 18, 2003	Anderson Mesa	LONEOS	·	1.7 km	MPC · JPL
247875	2003 UO_{145}	—	October 18, 2003	Anderson Mesa	LONEOS	NYS	1.4 km	MPC · JPL
247876	2003 UP_{151}	—	October 21, 2003	Socorro	LINEAR	·	3.3 km	MPC · JPL
247877	2003 UU_{152}	—	October 21, 2003	Socorro	LINEAR	·	3.0 km	MPC · JPL
247878	2003 UX_{153}	—	October 19, 2003	Kitt Peak	Spacewatch	AGN	3.1 km	MPC · JPL
247879	2003 UR_{161}	—	October 21, 2003	Socorro	LINEAR	3:2	6.6 km	MPC · JPL
247880	2003 UW_{162}	—	October 21, 2003	Socorro	LINEAR	·	1.7 km	MPC · JPL
247881	2003 UG_{169}	—	October 22, 2003	Socorro	LINEAR	·	5.2 km	MPC · JPL
247882	2003 UN_{171}	—	October 19, 2003	Kitt Peak	Spacewatch	·	1.7 km	MPC · JPL
247883	2003 UF_{178}	—	October 21, 2003	Palomar	NEAT	LUT	5.5 km	MPC · JPL
247884	2003 UV_{183}	—	October 21, 2003	Palomar	NEAT	·	1.3 km	MPC · JPL
247885	2003 UU_{184}	—	October 21, 2003	Kitt Peak	Spacewatch	·	1.9 km	MPC · JPL
247886	2003 UR_{191}	—	October 23, 2003	Anderson Mesa	LONEOS	·	3.6 km	MPC · JPL
247887	2003 UK_{195}	—	October 20, 2003	Kitt Peak	Spacewatch	·	3.4 km	MPC · JPL
247888	2003 UJ_{207}	—	October 22, 2003	Kitt Peak	Spacewatch	·	1.5 km	MPC · JPL
247889	2003 UA_{210}	—	October 23, 2003	Anderson Mesa	LONEOS	·	2.0 km	MPC · JPL
247890	2003 UY_{216}	—	October 21, 2003	Palomar	NEAT	·	4.4 km	MPC · JPL
247891	2003 UB_{222}	—	October 22, 2003	Kitt Peak	Spacewatch	·	2.2 km	MPC · JPL
247892	2003 UA_{226}	—	October 22, 2003	Kitt Peak	Spacewatch	·	1.5 km	MPC · JPL
247893	2003 UX_{228}	—	October 23, 2003	Anderson Mesa	LONEOS	T_{j} (2.97) · HIL · 3:2 · (6124)	7.0 km	MPC · JPL
247894	2003 UN_{236}	—	October 22, 2003	Haleakala	NEAT	·	1.4 km	MPC · JPL
247895	2003 UC_{243}	—	October 24, 2003	Socorro	LINEAR	·	5.2 km	MPC · JPL
247896	2003 UG_{243}	—	October 24, 2003	Haleakala	NEAT	LUT	6.2 km	MPC · JPL
247897	2003 UD_{244}	—	October 24, 2003	Socorro	LINEAR	·	4.7 km	MPC · JPL
247898	2003 UV_{246}	—	October 24, 2003	Socorro	LINEAR	·	3.5 km	MPC · JPL
247899	2003 UV_{249}	—	October 25, 2003	Socorro	LINEAR	·	1.9 km	MPC · JPL
247900	2003 UL_{275}	—	October 29, 2003	Socorro	LINEAR	T_{j} (2.98)	3.8 km	MPC · JPL

== 247901–248000 ==
back to top

Designation			Discovery			Properties		Ref
Permanent	Provisional	Named after	Date	Site	Discoverer(s)	Category	Diam.	Ref
247901	2003 UF_{277}	—	October 25, 2003	Kitt Peak	Spacewatch	·	4.1 km	MPC · JPL
247902	2003 UJ_{281}	—	October 28, 2003	Socorro	LINEAR	·	2.0 km	MPC · JPL
247903	2003 UO_{296}	—	October 16, 2003	Kitt Peak	Spacewatch	·	1.8 km	MPC · JPL
247904	2003 UC_{315}	—	October 25, 2003	Socorro	LINEAR	NYS	1.6 km	MPC · JPL
247905	2003 UE_{338}	—	October 18, 2003	Apache Point	SDSS	·	3.4 km	MPC · JPL
247906	2003 UR_{353}	—	October 19, 2003	Apache Point	SDSS	HOF	3.1 km	MPC · JPL
247907	2003 UE_{373}	—	October 22, 2003	Apache Point	SDSS	·	2.9 km	MPC · JPL
247908	2003 VS	—	November 5, 2003	Socorro	LINEAR	·	1.5 km	MPC · JPL
247909	2003 VA_{5}	—	November 15, 2003	Kitt Peak	Spacewatch	MAS	920 m	MPC · JPL
247910	2003 VC_{11}	—	November 15, 2003	Palomar	NEAT	·	4.5 km	MPC · JPL
247911	2003 VO_{12}	—	November 4, 2003	Socorro	LINEAR	·	3.8 km	MPC · JPL
247912	2003 WO_{22}	—	November 20, 2003	Socorro	LINEAR	·	3.2 km	MPC · JPL
247913	2003 WA_{27}	—	November 16, 2003	Kitt Peak	Spacewatch	EOS	3.0 km	MPC · JPL
247914	2003 WN_{29}	—	November 18, 2003	Kitt Peak	Spacewatch	EMA	4.7 km	MPC · JPL
247915	2003 WT_{29}	—	November 18, 2003	Kitt Peak	Spacewatch	·	4.5 km	MPC · JPL
247916	2003 WO_{34}	—	November 19, 2003	Kitt Peak	Spacewatch	DOR	4.5 km	MPC · JPL
247917	2003 WJ_{38}	—	November 19, 2003	Socorro	LINEAR	·	1.4 km	MPC · JPL
247918	2003 WB_{47}	—	November 18, 2003	Kitt Peak	Spacewatch	NYS	1.8 km	MPC · JPL
247919	2003 WK_{57}	—	November 18, 2003	Palomar	NEAT	·	1.3 km	MPC · JPL
247920	2003 WF_{65}	—	November 19, 2003	Kitt Peak	Spacewatch	3:2 · SHU	6.7 km	MPC · JPL
247921	2003 WA_{67}	—	November 19, 2003	Kitt Peak	Spacewatch	·	4.2 km	MPC · JPL
247922	2003 WO_{67}	—	November 19, 2003	Kitt Peak	Spacewatch	·	3.5 km	MPC · JPL
247923	2003 WF_{71}	—	November 20, 2003	Palomar	NEAT	TIR	2.5 km	MPC · JPL
247924	2003 WH_{74}	—	November 20, 2003	Socorro	LINEAR	EOS	3.6 km	MPC · JPL
247925	2003 WD_{87}	—	November 21, 2003	Socorro	LINEAR	·	2.5 km	MPC · JPL
247926	2003 WU_{100}	—	November 21, 2003	Palomar	NEAT	·	3.8 km	MPC · JPL
247927	2003 WR_{101}	—	November 21, 2003	Socorro	LINEAR	·	1.7 km	MPC · JPL
247928	2003 WT_{125}	—	November 20, 2003	Socorro	LINEAR	·	6.7 km	MPC · JPL
247929	2003 WZ_{132}	—	November 21, 2003	Socorro	LINEAR	NYS	1.5 km	MPC · JPL
247930	2003 WK_{136}	—	November 21, 2003	Socorro	LINEAR	·	2.9 km	MPC · JPL
247931	2003 WG_{146}	—	November 23, 2003	Palomar	NEAT	·	4.5 km	MPC · JPL
247932	2003 WB_{159}	—	November 29, 2003	Kitt Peak	Spacewatch	·	5.4 km	MPC · JPL
247933	2003 WL_{162}	—	November 30, 2003	Socorro	LINEAR	·	2.3 km	MPC · JPL
247934	2003 WJ_{189}	—	November 20, 2003	Palomar	NEAT	·	4.3 km	MPC · JPL
247935	2003 WS_{190}	—	November 29, 2003	Socorro	LINEAR	·	3.9 km	MPC · JPL
247936	2003 XJ_{1}	—	December 1, 2003	Socorro	LINEAR	·	1.7 km	MPC · JPL
247937	2003 XQ_{14}	—	December 4, 2003	Socorro	LINEAR	·	4.9 km	MPC · JPL
247938	2003 XK_{16}	—	December 14, 2003	Palomar	NEAT	·	3.6 km	MPC · JPL
247939	2003 XW_{17}	—	December 14, 2003	Kitt Peak	Spacewatch	·	3.1 km	MPC · JPL
247940	2003 XX_{21}	—	December 15, 2003	Kitt Peak	Spacewatch	·	4.1 km	MPC · JPL
247941	2003 XN_{42}	—	December 15, 2003	Socorro	LINEAR	·	4.8 km	MPC · JPL
247942	2003 XM_{43}	—	December 4, 2003	Socorro	LINEAR	T_{j} (2.98) · EUP	5.3 km	MPC · JPL
247943	2003 YH_{7}	—	December 17, 2003	Kitt Peak	Spacewatch	·	6.9 km	MPC · JPL
247944	2003 YO_{10}	—	December 17, 2003	Socorro	LINEAR	·	5.4 km	MPC · JPL
247945	2003 YU_{12}	—	December 17, 2003	Anderson Mesa	LONEOS	·	4.0 km	MPC · JPL
247946	2003 YE_{20}	—	December 17, 2003	Kitt Peak	Spacewatch	L5	12 km	MPC · JPL
247947	2003 YP_{20}	—	December 17, 2003	Kitt Peak	Spacewatch	TEL	3.6 km	MPC · JPL
247948	2003 YD_{28}	—	December 17, 2003	Palomar	NEAT	·	5.1 km	MPC · JPL
247949	2003 YN_{33}	—	December 17, 2003	Catalina	CSS	·	3.6 km	MPC · JPL
247950	2003 YE_{40}	—	December 19, 2003	Kitt Peak	Spacewatch	·	4.3 km	MPC · JPL
247951	2003 YR_{43}	—	December 19, 2003	Socorro	LINEAR	·	5.5 km	MPC · JPL
247952	2003 YE_{46}	—	December 17, 2003	Socorro	LINEAR	·	2.3 km	MPC · JPL
247953	2003 YF_{63}	—	December 19, 2003	Socorro	LINEAR	·	2.8 km	MPC · JPL
247954	2003 YP_{67}	—	December 19, 2003	Socorro	LINEAR	EMA · slow	5.0 km	MPC · JPL
247955	2003 YW_{70}	—	December 18, 2003	Socorro	LINEAR	·	2.3 km	MPC · JPL
247956	2003 YC_{77}	—	December 18, 2003	Socorro	LINEAR	·	3.4 km	MPC · JPL
247957	2003 YH_{79}	—	December 18, 2003	Socorro	LINEAR	·	4.0 km	MPC · JPL
247958	2003 YH_{99}	—	December 19, 2003	Socorro	LINEAR	·	5.1 km	MPC · JPL
247959	2003 YX_{106}	—	December 22, 2003	Catalina	CSS	HNS	1.8 km	MPC · JPL
247960	2003 YL_{117}	—	December 27, 2003	Socorro	LINEAR	H	710 m	MPC · JPL
247961	2003 YA_{123}	—	December 27, 2003	Socorro	LINEAR	CYB	5.1 km	MPC · JPL
247962	2003 YZ_{130}	—	December 28, 2003	Socorro	LINEAR	·	4.1 km	MPC · JPL
247963	2003 YY_{136}	—	December 27, 2003	Catalina	CSS	PHO	1.8 km	MPC · JPL
247964	2003 YF_{139}	—	December 28, 2003	Socorro	LINEAR	·	4.9 km	MPC · JPL
247965	2003 YO_{148}	—	December 29, 2003	Socorro	LINEAR	·	4.0 km	MPC · JPL
247966	2003 YQ_{148}	—	December 29, 2003	Catalina	CSS	·	3.5 km	MPC · JPL
247967	2003 YD_{149}	—	December 29, 2003	Catalina	CSS	L5	21 km	MPC · JPL
247968	2003 YN_{150}	—	December 29, 2003	Socorro	LINEAR	ERI	2.3 km	MPC · JPL
247969	2004 AG_{17}	—	January 15, 2004	Kitt Peak	Spacewatch	L5	15 km	MPC · JPL
247970	2004 AJ_{20}	—	January 15, 2004	Kitt Peak	Spacewatch	HOF	3.5 km	MPC · JPL
247971	2004 BA_{48}	—	January 21, 2004	Socorro	LINEAR	·	5.9 km	MPC · JPL
247972	2004 BB_{73}	—	January 24, 2004	Socorro	LINEAR	·	2.7 km	MPC · JPL
247973	2004 BJ_{84}	—	January 25, 2004	Haleakala	NEAT	·	4.4 km	MPC · JPL
247974	2004 BR_{101}	—	January 29, 2004	Socorro	LINEAR	·	4.0 km	MPC · JPL
247975	2004 BZ_{101}	—	January 29, 2004	Socorro	LINEAR	EUP	5.5 km	MPC · JPL
247976	2004 BF_{102}	—	January 29, 2004	Kitt Peak	Spacewatch	·	3.4 km	MPC · JPL
247977	2004 BK_{104}	—	January 23, 2004	Socorro	LINEAR	EUP	6.2 km	MPC · JPL
247978	2004 BJ_{105}	—	January 24, 2004	Socorro	LINEAR	·	3.8 km	MPC · JPL
247979	2004 CM_{5}	—	February 10, 2004	Palomar	NEAT	PAD	3.3 km	MPC · JPL
247980	2004 CF_{14}	—	February 11, 2004	Palomar	NEAT	·	2.6 km	MPC · JPL
247981	2004 CT_{16}	—	February 11, 2004	Kitt Peak	Spacewatch	·	3.4 km	MPC · JPL
247982	2004 CE_{18}	—	February 10, 2004	Palomar	NEAT	·	3.2 km	MPC · JPL
247983	2004 CZ_{32}	—	February 12, 2004	Kitt Peak	Spacewatch	·	4.3 km	MPC · JPL
247984	2004 CL_{71}	—	February 13, 2004	Kitt Peak	Spacewatch	·	4.2 km	MPC · JPL
247985	2004 CB_{72}	—	February 13, 2004	Palomar	NEAT	DOR	3.6 km	MPC · JPL
247986	2004 CU_{77}	—	February 11, 2004	Palomar	NEAT	AGN	3.8 km	MPC · JPL
247987	2004 CV_{77}	—	February 11, 2004	Palomar	NEAT	·	3.1 km	MPC · JPL
247988	2004 CF_{78}	—	February 11, 2004	Palomar	NEAT	·	3.0 km	MPC · JPL
247989	2004 CW_{91}	—	February 14, 2004	Kitt Peak	Spacewatch	·	2.9 km	MPC · JPL
247990	2004 CG_{118}	—	February 11, 2004	Kitt Peak	Spacewatch	·	2.7 km	MPC · JPL
247991	2004 CA_{122}	—	February 12, 2004	Kitt Peak	Spacewatch	·	2.6 km	MPC · JPL
247992	2004 CF_{122}	—	February 12, 2004	Palomar	NEAT	·	3.1 km	MPC · JPL
247993	2004 CL_{123}	—	February 12, 2004	Kitt Peak	Spacewatch	(17392)	2.1 km	MPC · JPL
247994	2004 CO_{128}	—	February 14, 2004	Palomar	NEAT	·	2.9 km	MPC · JPL
247995	2004 DJ_{10}	—	February 18, 2004	Desert Eagle	W. K. Y. Yeung	·	5.1 km	MPC · JPL
247996	2004 DV_{12}	—	February 16, 2004	Catalina	CSS	·	4.5 km	MPC · JPL
247997	2004 DT_{22}	—	February 18, 2004	Socorro	LINEAR	THB	4.2 km	MPC · JPL
247998	2004 DS_{46}	—	February 19, 2004	Socorro	LINEAR	·	4.5 km	MPC · JPL
247999	2004 DN_{55}	—	February 22, 2004	Kitt Peak	Spacewatch	·	1.9 km	MPC · JPL
248000	2004 DX_{59}	—	February 26, 2004	Desert Eagle	W. K. Y. Yeung	AGN	1.6 km	MPC · JPL

back to top

== See also ==
- Meanings of minor-planet names: 247001–248000
