= Meanings of minor-planet names: 247001–248000 =

As minor planet discoveries are confirmed, they are given a permanent number by the IAU's Minor Planet Center (MPC), and the discoverers can then submit names for them, following the IAU's naming conventions. The list below concerns those minor planets in the specified number-range that have received names, and explains the meanings of those names.

Official naming citations of newly named small Solar System bodies are approved and published in a bulletin by IAU's Working Group for Small Bodies Nomenclature (WGSBN). Before May 2021, citations were published in MPC's Minor Planet Circulars for many decades. Recent citations can also be found on the JPL Small-Body Database (SBDB). Until his death in 2016, German astronomer Lutz D. Schmadel compiled these citations into the Dictionary of Minor Planet Names (DMP) and regularly updated the collection.

Based on Paul Herget's The Names of the Minor Planets, Schmadel also researched the unclear origin of numerous asteroids, most of which had been named prior to World War II. This article incorporates text from this source, which is in the public domain: SBDB New namings may only be added to this list below after official publication as the preannouncement of names is condemned. The WGSBN publishes a comprehensive guideline for the naming rules of non-cometary small Solar System bodies.

== 247001–247100 ==
Named minor planet	Provisional	This minor planet was named for...	Ref · Catalog
There are no named minor planets in this number range

== 247101–247200 ==
back to top

Named minor planet	Provisional	This minor planet was named for...	Ref · Catalog
There are no named minor planets in this number range

== 247201–247300 ==
back to top

Named minor planet	Provisional	This minor planet was named for...	Ref · Catalog
There are no named minor planets in this number range

== 247301–247400 ==
back to top

Named minor planet	Provisional	This minor planet was named for...	Ref · Catalog
247341 Shaulladany	2001 UV_{209}	Shaul Ladany (b. 1936), Israeli Holocaust survivor, academic, and champion racewalker. He has appeared in two Olympics and holds world record in the 50-mile walk. He is currently a Professor of Industrial Engineering and Management at Ben Gurion University.	IAU · 247341

== 247401–247500 ==
back to top

Named minor planet	Provisional	This minor planet was named for...	Ref · Catalog
There are no named minor planets in this number range

== 247501–247600 ==
back to top

Named minor planet	Provisional	This minor planet was named for...	Ref · Catalog
247542 Ripplrónai	2002 RP_{117}	József Rippl-Rónai (1861–1927), a Post-Impressionist avant-garde Hungarian painter, known for working in the Les Nabis style	JPL · 247542
247553 Berndpauli	2002 RV_{234}	Bernd V. Pauli (born 1945) is a respected meteorite aficionado and collector with keen interests in astronomy and Egyptology. Co-author of the Electronic Catalogue of Meteorites and Meteorite Craters, he has been a long-time member of the Meteoritical Society and a prolific contributor to the Meteorite Mailing List.	JPL · 247553

== 247601–247700 ==
back to top

Named minor planet	Provisional	This minor planet was named for...	Ref · Catalog
247652 Hajossy	2002 WO_{21}	Rudolf Hajossy (born 1941) is enthusiastic physicist and senior lecturer at the Comenius University in Bratislava, Slovakia.	JPL · 247652

== 247701–247800 ==
back to top

Named minor planet	Provisional	This minor planet was named for...	Ref · Catalog
There are no named minor planets in this number range

== 247801–247900 ==
back to top

Named minor planet	Provisional	This minor planet was named for...	Ref · Catalog
247821 Coignet	2003 SN_{170}	Michiel Coignet (1549–1623) was a Flemish polymath and astronomer at the court of Archdukes Albert and Isabella in the Spanish Netherlands.	IAU · 247821

== 247901–248000 ==
back to top

Named minor planet	Provisional	This minor planet was named for...	Ref · Catalog
There are no named minor planets in this number range

back to top

Preceded by 246,001–247,000	Meanings of minor-planet names List of minor planets: 247,001–248,000	Succeeded by 248,001–249,000
