= List of minor planets: 248001–249000 =

The following is a partial list of minor planets, running from minor-planet number 248001 through 249000, inclusive. The primary data for this and other partial lists is based on JPL's "Small-Body Orbital Elements" and data available from the Minor Planet Center. Critical list information is also provided by the MPC, unless otherwise specified from Lowell Observatory. A detailed description of the table's columns and additional sources are given on the main page including a complete list of every page in this series, and a statistical break-up on the dynamical classification of minor planets.

Also see the summary list of all named bodies in numerical and alphabetical order, and the corresponding naming citations for the number range of this particular list. New namings may only be added to this list after official publication, as the preannouncement of names is condemned by the Working Group for Small Bodies Nomenclature of the International Astronomical Union.

Near-Earth obj.	MBA (inner)	MBA (outer)	Centaur
Mars-crosser	MBA (middle)	Jupiter trojan	Trans-Neptunian obj.
Unclassified

== 248001–248100 ==
Designation			Discovery			Properties		Ref
Permanent	Provisional	Named after	Date	Site	Discoverer(s)	Category	Diam.	Ref
248001	2004 DS_{71}	—	February 17, 2004	Catalina	CSS	·	5.6 km	MPC · JPL
248002	2004 EC_{16}	—	March 12, 2004	Palomar	NEAT	·	3.9 km	MPC · JPL
248003	2004 EE_{25}	—	March 15, 2004	Goodricke-Pigott	R. A. Tucker	·	5.4 km	MPC · JPL
248004	2004 EG_{34}	—	March 12, 2004	Palomar	NEAT	HIL · 3:2	6.6 km	MPC · JPL
248005	2004 EK_{36}	—	March 13, 2004	Palomar	NEAT	GEF	2.1 km	MPC · JPL
248006	2004 EJ_{41}	—	March 15, 2004	Kitt Peak	Spacewatch	·	3.3 km	MPC · JPL
248007	2004 EA_{45}	—	March 15, 2004	Kitt Peak	Spacewatch	·	2.6 km	MPC · JPL
248008	2004 EF_{46}	—	March 15, 2004	Socorro	LINEAR	·	4.5 km	MPC · JPL
248009	2004 EQ_{54}	—	March 14, 2004	Palomar	NEAT	·	5.4 km	MPC · JPL
248010	2004 EZ_{56}	—	March 15, 2004	Kitt Peak	Spacewatch	·	3.5 km	MPC · JPL
248011	2004 EP_{69}	—	March 15, 2004	Kitt Peak	Spacewatch	(5)	1.9 km	MPC · JPL
248012	2004 EH_{94}	—	March 15, 2004	Kitt Peak	Spacewatch	·	3.5 km	MPC · JPL
248013	2004 EX_{108}	—	March 15, 2004	Kitt Peak	Spacewatch	·	4.1 km	MPC · JPL
248014	2004 FC_{13}	—	March 16, 2004	Catalina	CSS	EUP	5.9 km	MPC · JPL
248015	2004 FL_{13}	—	March 16, 2004	Kitt Peak	Spacewatch	·	3.2 km	MPC · JPL
248016	2004 FM_{21}	—	March 16, 2004	Kitt Peak	Spacewatch	KON	3.3 km	MPC · JPL
248017	2004 FZ_{25}	—	March 17, 2004	Socorro	LINEAR	TIR ·	5.5 km	MPC · JPL
248018	2004 FU_{28}	—	March 27, 2004	Socorro	LINEAR	H	730 m	MPC · JPL
248019	2004 FP_{36}	—	March 16, 2004	Kitt Peak	Spacewatch	·	5.1 km	MPC · JPL
248020	2004 FX_{40}	—	March 18, 2004	Socorro	LINEAR	·	3.3 km	MPC · JPL
248021	2004 FP_{51}	—	March 19, 2004	Palomar	NEAT	·	4.6 km	MPC · JPL
248022	2004 FQ_{65}	—	March 19, 2004	Socorro	LINEAR	·	4.4 km	MPC · JPL
248023	2004 FR_{66}	—	March 20, 2004	Socorro	LINEAR	·	2.8 km	MPC · JPL
248024	2004 FG_{74}	—	March 17, 2004	Kitt Peak	Spacewatch	·	2.4 km	MPC · JPL
248025	2004 FG_{75}	—	March 17, 2004	Kitt Peak	Spacewatch	·	1.7 km	MPC · JPL
248026	2004 FA_{77}	—	March 18, 2004	Socorro	LINEAR	·	4.4 km	MPC · JPL
248027	2004 FU_{92}	—	March 18, 2004	Socorro	LINEAR	URS	6.3 km	MPC · JPL
248028	2004 FJ_{130}	—	March 22, 2004	Anderson Mesa	LONEOS	·	5.1 km	MPC · JPL
248029	2004 FD_{135}	—	March 27, 2004	Socorro	LINEAR	·	4.3 km	MPC · JPL
248030	2004 FU_{165}	—	March 16, 2004	Kitt Peak	Spacewatch	·	2.1 km	MPC · JPL
248031	2004 GH_{2}	—	April 9, 2004	Siding Spring	SSS	T_{j} (2.98)	4.8 km	MPC · JPL
248032	2004 GV_{5}	—	April 12, 2004	Palomar	NEAT	·	5.1 km	MPC · JPL
248033	2004 GA_{9}	—	April 12, 2004	Kitt Peak	Spacewatch	·	5.2 km	MPC · JPL
248034	2004 GT_{22}	—	April 12, 2004	Anderson Mesa	LONEOS	·	1.7 km	MPC · JPL
248035	2004 GK_{23}	—	April 12, 2004	Kitt Peak	Spacewatch	·	3.0 km	MPC · JPL
248036	2004 GY_{24}	—	April 13, 2004	Siding Spring	SSS	·	6.6 km	MPC · JPL
248037	2004 GL_{30}	—	April 12, 2004	Kitt Peak	Spacewatch	·	4.0 km	MPC · JPL
248038	2004 GH_{34}	—	April 13, 2004	Palomar	NEAT	·	4.9 km	MPC · JPL
248039	2004 GD_{80}	—	April 12, 2004	Catalina	CSS	·	3.2 km	MPC · JPL
248040	2004 GW_{83}	—	April 14, 2004	Palomar	NEAT	DOR	4.5 km	MPC · JPL
248041	2004 HN_{1}	—	April 19, 2004	Socorro	LINEAR	H	920 m	MPC · JPL
248042	2004 HF_{19}	—	April 19, 2004	Kitt Peak	Spacewatch	·	1.1 km	MPC · JPL
248043	2004 HQ_{29}	—	April 21, 2004	Socorro	LINEAR	·	3.3 km	MPC · JPL
248044	2004 HP_{37}	—	April 21, 2004	Socorro	LINEAR	·	3.3 km	MPC · JPL
248045	2004 HT_{49}	—	April 23, 2004	Kitt Peak	Spacewatch	·	4.4 km	MPC · JPL
248046	2004 HM_{55}	—	April 24, 2004	Socorro	LINEAR	·	4.0 km	MPC · JPL
248047	2004 HS_{63}	—	April 26, 2004	Socorro	LINEAR	·	4.6 km	MPC · JPL
248048	2004 HD_{70}	—	April 24, 2004	Kitt Peak	Spacewatch	L4	20 km	MPC · JPL
248049	2004 JX_{11}	—	May 13, 2004	Socorro	LINEAR	H	1.1 km	MPC · JPL
248050	2004 JT_{14}	—	May 9, 2004	Kitt Peak	Spacewatch	·	2.4 km	MPC · JPL
248051	2004 JZ_{21}	—	May 9, 2004	Kitt Peak	Spacewatch	·	2.6 km	MPC · JPL
248052	2004 JX_{55}	—	May 14, 2004	Palomar	NEAT	·	4.2 km	MPC · JPL
248053	2004 KN_{14}	—	May 23, 2004	Kitt Peak	Spacewatch	·	1.6 km	MPC · JPL
248054	2004 KV_{17}	—	May 27, 2004	Reedy Creek	J. Broughton	·	5.0 km	MPC · JPL
248055	2004 LT_{5}	—	June 10, 2004	Campo Imperatore	CINEOS	·	4.4 km	MPC · JPL
248056	2004 LB_{8}	—	June 11, 2004	Anderson Mesa	LONEOS	·	7.1 km	MPC · JPL
248057	2004 LN_{23}	—	June 15, 2004	Socorro	LINEAR	·	3.1 km	MPC · JPL
248058	2004 LF_{24}	—	June 12, 2004	Socorro	LINEAR	·	6.7 km	MPC · JPL
248059	2004 LV_{27}	—	June 13, 2004	Kitt Peak	Spacewatch	·	4.7 km	MPC · JPL
248060	2004 LE_{31}	—	June 13, 2004	Socorro	LINEAR	PHO	3.1 km	MPC · JPL
248061	2004 MD_{4}	—	June 18, 2004	Anderson Mesa	LONEOS	·	5.9 km	MPC · JPL
248062	2004 MV_{6}	—	June 25, 2004	Reedy Creek	J. Broughton	·	3.6 km	MPC · JPL
248063	2004 NE_{13}	—	July 11, 2004	Socorro	LINEAR	·	1.8 km	MPC · JPL
248064	2004 NH_{31}	—	July 11, 2004	Anderson Mesa	LONEOS	·	6.3 km	MPC · JPL
248065	2004 OZ	—	July 16, 2004	Campo Imperatore	CINEOS	·	2.8 km	MPC · JPL
248066	2004 OA_{10}	—	July 21, 2004	Reedy Creek	J. Broughton	·	2.8 km	MPC · JPL
248067	2004 OO_{11}	—	July 25, 2004	Anderson Mesa	LONEOS	·	4.6 km	MPC · JPL
248068	2004 PT_{29}	—	August 7, 2004	Palomar	NEAT	·	5.1 km	MPC · JPL
248069	2004 PX_{29}	—	August 7, 2004	Palomar	NEAT	·	2.6 km	MPC · JPL
248070	2004 PX_{31}	—	August 8, 2004	Socorro	LINEAR	THB	5.4 km	MPC · JPL
248071	2004 PA_{45}	—	August 7, 2004	Palomar	NEAT	·	2.9 km	MPC · JPL
248072	2004 PP_{47}	—	August 8, 2004	Socorro	LINEAR	·	2.6 km	MPC · JPL
248073	2004 PT_{48}	—	August 8, 2004	Socorro	LINEAR	·	4.6 km	MPC · JPL
248074	2004 PD_{56}	—	August 8, 2004	Campo Imperatore	CINEOS	·	5.2 km	MPC · JPL
248075	2004 PO_{56}	—	August 9, 2004	Socorro	LINEAR	EOS	3.5 km	MPC · JPL
248076	2004 PG_{65}	—	August 10, 2004	Socorro	LINEAR	·	840 m	MPC · JPL
248077	2004 PD_{83}	—	August 10, 2004	Socorro	LINEAR	·	5.4 km	MPC · JPL
248078	2004 PW_{91}	—	August 12, 2004	Socorro	LINEAR	·	6.1 km	MPC · JPL
248079	2004 PE_{100}	—	August 11, 2004	Siding Spring	SSS	·	5.6 km	MPC · JPL
248080	2004 PL_{110}	—	August 12, 2004	Socorro	LINEAR	·	4.1 km	MPC · JPL
248081	2004 QA_{8}	—	August 16, 2004	Siding Spring	SSS	·	2.2 km	MPC · JPL
248082	2004 QY_{21}	—	August 26, 2004	Catalina	CSS	·	1.3 km	MPC · JPL
248083	2004 QU_{24}	—	August 27, 2004	Catalina	CSS	T_{j} (2.72) · AMO · CYB · +1km	2.4 km	MPC · JPL
248084	2004 QU_{26}	—	August 27, 2004	Anderson Mesa	LONEOS	·	2.7 km	MPC · JPL
248085	2004 RO	—	September 3, 2004	Palomar	NEAT	EUP	6.6 km	MPC · JPL
248086	2004 RD_{1}	—	September 3, 2004	Palomar	NEAT	·	2.1 km	MPC · JPL
248087	2004 RR_{5}	—	September 4, 2004	Palomar	NEAT	·	5.6 km	MPC · JPL
248088	2004 RL_{13}	—	September 6, 2004	Needville	Needville	·	4.0 km	MPC · JPL
248089	2004 RF_{30}	—	September 7, 2004	Socorro	LINEAR	T_{j} (2.99)	4.4 km	MPC · JPL
248090	2004 RA_{36}	—	September 7, 2004	Socorro	LINEAR	·	6.0 km	MPC · JPL
248091	2004 RV_{42}	—	September 8, 2004	Socorro	LINEAR	·	1.7 km	MPC · JPL
248092	2004 RL_{57}	—	September 8, 2004	Socorro	LINEAR	·	5.3 km	MPC · JPL
248093	2004 RH_{62}	—	September 8, 2004	Socorro	LINEAR	VER	5.6 km	MPC · JPL
248094	2004 RE_{64}	—	September 8, 2004	Socorro	LINEAR	·	3.6 km	MPC · JPL
248095	2004 RX_{64}	—	September 8, 2004	Socorro	LINEAR	THM	4.3 km	MPC · JPL
248096	2004 RJ_{73}	—	September 8, 2004	Socorro	LINEAR	·	3.9 km	MPC · JPL
248097	2004 RQ_{77}	—	September 8, 2004	Socorro	LINEAR	·	3.5 km	MPC · JPL
248098	2004 RG_{85}	—	September 7, 2004	Bergisch Gladbach	W. Bickel	slow	7.0 km	MPC · JPL
248099	2004 RO_{87}	—	September 7, 2004	Palomar	NEAT	(8737)	4.7 km	MPC · JPL
248100	2004 RC_{91}	—	September 8, 2004	Socorro	LINEAR	EOS	5.1 km	MPC · JPL

== 248101–248200 ==
back to top

Designation			Discovery			Properties		Ref
Permanent	Provisional	Named after	Date	Site	Discoverer(s)	Category	Diam.	Ref
248101	2004 RP_{91}	—	September 8, 2004	Socorro	LINEAR	·	3.9 km	MPC · JPL
248102	2004 RA_{92}	—	September 8, 2004	Socorro	LINEAR	EOS	3.4 km	MPC · JPL
248103	2004 RX_{94}	—	September 8, 2004	Socorro	LINEAR	CYB	5.7 km	MPC · JPL
248104	2004 RJ_{98}	—	September 8, 2004	Socorro	LINEAR	·	2.6 km	MPC · JPL
248105	2004 RT_{102}	—	September 8, 2004	Socorro	LINEAR	·	4.8 km	MPC · JPL
248106	2004 RP_{105}	—	September 8, 2004	Palomar	NEAT	·	3.1 km	MPC · JPL
248107	2004 RA_{109}	—	September 9, 2004	Kitt Peak	Spacewatch	·	890 m	MPC · JPL
248108	2004 RR_{118}	—	September 7, 2004	Kitt Peak	Spacewatch	·	3.6 km	MPC · JPL
248109	2004 RN_{137}	—	September 8, 2004	Socorro	LINEAR	·	2.8 km	MPC · JPL
248110	2004 RN_{138}	—	September 8, 2004	Palomar	NEAT	·	2.8 km	MPC · JPL
248111	2004 RX_{158}	—	September 10, 2004	Socorro	LINEAR	·	4.6 km	MPC · JPL
248112	2004 RY_{167}	—	September 7, 2004	Palomar	NEAT	·	4.6 km	MPC · JPL
248113	2004 RG_{170}	—	September 8, 2004	Palomar	NEAT	·	5.5 km	MPC · JPL
248114	2004 RR_{178}	—	September 10, 2004	Socorro	LINEAR	·	5.8 km	MPC · JPL
248115	2004 RS_{179}	—	September 10, 2004	Socorro	LINEAR	LIX	5.0 km	MPC · JPL
248116	2004 RN_{180}	—	September 10, 2004	Socorro	LINEAR	·	3.9 km	MPC · JPL
248117	2004 RF_{189}	—	September 10, 2004	Socorro	LINEAR	·	5.1 km	MPC · JPL
248118	2004 RB_{193}	—	September 10, 2004	Socorro	LINEAR	·	4.0 km	MPC · JPL
248119	2004 RA_{194}	—	September 10, 2004	Socorro	LINEAR	·	4.8 km	MPC · JPL
248120	2004 RO_{195}	—	September 10, 2004	Socorro	LINEAR	·	5.7 km	MPC · JPL
248121	2004 RR_{198}	—	September 10, 2004	Socorro	LINEAR	VER	5.8 km	MPC · JPL
248122	2004 RB_{199}	—	September 10, 2004	Socorro	LINEAR	·	3.4 km	MPC · JPL
248123	2004 RR_{200}	—	September 10, 2004	Socorro	LINEAR	·	4.7 km	MPC · JPL
248124	2004 RY_{208}	—	September 11, 2004	Socorro	LINEAR	·	2.9 km	MPC · JPL
248125	2004 RG_{212}	—	September 11, 2004	Socorro	LINEAR	·	4.7 km	MPC · JPL
248126	2004 RD_{214}	—	September 11, 2004	Socorro	LINEAR	·	2.6 km	MPC · JPL
248127	2004 RL_{220}	—	September 11, 2004	Socorro	LINEAR	·	6.3 km	MPC · JPL
248128	2004 RN_{291}	—	September 10, 2004	Socorro	LINEAR	·	5.9 km	MPC · JPL
248129	2004 RK_{312}	—	September 15, 2004	Anderson Mesa	LONEOS	·	3.1 km	MPC · JPL
248130	2004 RC_{347}	—	September 14, 2004	Anderson Mesa	LONEOS	·	5.6 km	MPC · JPL
248131	2004 SB_{24}	—	September 17, 2004	Kitt Peak	Spacewatch	·	4.0 km	MPC · JPL
248132	2004 SJ_{36}	—	September 17, 2004	Kitt Peak	Spacewatch	EMA	6.3 km	MPC · JPL
248133	2004 SM_{38}	—	September 17, 2004	Socorro	LINEAR	·	5.5 km	MPC · JPL
248134	2004 SY_{47}	—	September 18, 2004	Socorro	LINEAR	·	4.5 km	MPC · JPL
248135	2004 SB_{48}	—	September 18, 2004	Socorro	LINEAR	·	2.7 km	MPC · JPL
248136	2004 SR_{48}	—	September 21, 2004	Socorro	LINEAR	·	5.4 km	MPC · JPL
248137	2004 SC_{49}	—	September 21, 2004	Socorro	LINEAR	·	4.0 km	MPC · JPL
248138	2004 SA_{53}	—	September 22, 2004	Socorro	LINEAR	·	3.9 km	MPC · JPL
248139	2004 SH_{62}	—	September 17, 2004	Kitt Peak	Spacewatch	·	4.6 km	MPC · JPL
248140	2004 SJ_{62}	—	September 21, 2004	Anderson Mesa	LONEOS	·	7.8 km	MPC · JPL
248141	2004 TW_{31}	—	October 4, 2004	Kitt Peak	Spacewatch	SYL · CYB	7.8 km	MPC · JPL
248142	2004 TH_{60}	—	October 5, 2004	Anderson Mesa	LONEOS	·	5.3 km	MPC · JPL
248143	2004 TV_{105}	—	October 7, 2004	Socorro	LINEAR	VER	5.7 km	MPC · JPL
248144	2004 TB_{117}	—	October 5, 2004	Anderson Mesa	LONEOS	·	6.2 km	MPC · JPL
248145	2004 TO_{117}	—	October 5, 2004	Socorro	LINEAR	·	5.0 km	MPC · JPL
248146	2004 TY_{118}	—	October 6, 2004	Anderson Mesa	LONEOS	HYG	3.5 km	MPC · JPL
248147	2004 TR_{120}	—	October 6, 2004	Palomar	NEAT	·	3.9 km	MPC · JPL
248148	2004 TF_{182}	—	October 7, 2004	Kitt Peak	Spacewatch	·	1.6 km	MPC · JPL
248149	2004 TM_{182}	—	October 7, 2004	Kitt Peak	Spacewatch	·	4.9 km	MPC · JPL
248150	2004 TM_{196}	—	October 7, 2004	Kitt Peak	Spacewatch	·	2.6 km	MPC · JPL
248151	2004 TP_{197}	—	October 7, 2004	Kitt Peak	Spacewatch	·	1.8 km	MPC · JPL
248152	2004 TT_{203}	—	October 7, 2004	Kitt Peak	Spacewatch	·	2.8 km	MPC · JPL
248153	2004 TR_{235}	—	October 8, 2004	Kitt Peak	Spacewatch	·	1.7 km	MPC · JPL
248154	2004 TO_{236}	—	October 8, 2004	Socorro	LINEAR	·	3.0 km	MPC · JPL
248155	2004 TK_{293}	—	October 10, 2004	Kitt Peak	Spacewatch	(45637) · CYB	5.4 km	MPC · JPL
248156	2004 TW_{298}	—	October 13, 2004	Kitt Peak	Spacewatch	ADE	3.3 km	MPC · JPL
248157	2004 TJ_{326}	—	October 14, 2004	Palomar	NEAT	·	7.8 km	MPC · JPL
248158	2004 UV_{9}	—	October 24, 2004	Anderson Mesa	LONEOS	·	2.5 km	MPC · JPL
248159	2004 VH	—	November 2, 2004	Palomar	NEAT	·	1.7 km	MPC · JPL
248160	2004 VU_{8}	—	November 3, 2004	Anderson Mesa	LONEOS	ADE	3.4 km	MPC · JPL
248161	2004 VM_{9}	—	November 3, 2004	Anderson Mesa	LONEOS	·	2.7 km	MPC · JPL
248162	2004 VH_{13}	—	November 3, 2004	Palomar	NEAT	·	3.5 km	MPC · JPL
248163	2004 VW_{53}	—	November 7, 2004	Socorro	LINEAR	·	3.4 km	MPC · JPL
248164	2004 VY_{63}	—	November 9, 2004	Catalina	CSS	·	5.9 km	MPC · JPL
248165	2004 VK_{77}	—	November 12, 2004	Socorro	LINEAR	(194)	3.4 km	MPC · JPL
248166	2004 XX_{2}	—	December 2, 2004	Catalina	CSS	·	4.8 km	MPC · JPL
248167	2004 XW_{10}	—	December 3, 2004	Kitt Peak	Spacewatch	·	3.3 km	MPC · JPL
248168	2004 XB_{29}	—	December 10, 2004	Kitt Peak	Spacewatch	·	1.1 km	MPC · JPL
248169	2004 XP_{59}	—	December 11, 2004	Socorro	LINEAR	·	4.4 km	MPC · JPL
248170	2004 XF_{60}	—	December 12, 2004	Kitt Peak	Spacewatch	·	2.6 km	MPC · JPL
248171	2004 XH_{61}	—	December 12, 2004	Kitt Peak	Spacewatch	·	1.0 km	MPC · JPL
248172	2004 XO_{65}	—	December 2, 2004	Socorro	LINEAR	EUP	7.2 km	MPC · JPL
248173	2004 XX_{68}	—	December 8, 2004	Socorro	LINEAR	·	3.0 km	MPC · JPL
248174	2004 XQ_{83}	—	December 11, 2004	Kitt Peak	Spacewatch	·	2.9 km	MPC · JPL
248175	2004 XK_{95}	—	December 11, 2004	Kitt Peak	Spacewatch	·	1.1 km	MPC · JPL
248176	2004 XQ_{123}	—	December 10, 2004	Socorro	LINEAR	·	2.3 km	MPC · JPL
248177	2004 YW_{11}	—	December 18, 2004	Mount Lemmon	Mount Lemmon Survey	·	4.7 km	MPC · JPL
248178	2005 AH_{3}	—	January 6, 2005	Socorro	LINEAR	·	1.1 km	MPC · JPL
248179	2005 AE_{5}	—	January 6, 2005	Catalina	CSS	·	1.7 km	MPC · JPL
248180	2005 AW_{8}	—	January 6, 2005	Catalina	CSS	·	3.2 km	MPC · JPL
248181	2005 AH_{17}	—	January 6, 2005	Socorro	LINEAR	·	3.2 km	MPC · JPL
248182	2005 AV_{26}	—	January 13, 2005	Catalina	CSS	·	1.4 km	MPC · JPL
248183 Peisandros	2005 AD_{28}	Peisandros	January 13, 2005	Vicques	M. Ory	L5	12 km	MPC · JPL
248184	2005 AQ_{74}	—	January 15, 2005	Kitt Peak	Spacewatch	·	4.7 km	MPC · JPL
248185	2005 AU_{74}	—	January 15, 2005	Kitt Peak	Spacewatch	·	980 m	MPC · JPL
248186	2005 AY_{82}	—	January 6, 2005	Catalina	CSS	L5	21 km	MPC · JPL
248187	2005 BA_{1}	—	January 16, 2005	Kitt Peak	Spacewatch	ADE	2.5 km	MPC · JPL
248188	2005 BM_{5}	—	January 16, 2005	Kitt Peak	Spacewatch	SUL	3.5 km	MPC · JPL
248189	2005 BE_{17}	—	January 16, 2005	Kitt Peak	Spacewatch	L5	16 km	MPC · JPL
248190	2005 BL_{32}	—	January 16, 2005	Mauna Kea	Veillet, C.	MAS	790 m	MPC · JPL
248191	2005 CK_{6}	—	February 1, 2005	Kitt Peak	Spacewatch	NYS	1.7 km	MPC · JPL
248192	2005 CB_{20}	—	February 2, 2005	Kitt Peak	Spacewatch	·	2.7 km	MPC · JPL
248193	2005 CR_{33}	—	February 2, 2005	Kitt Peak	Spacewatch	·	4.0 km	MPC · JPL
248194	2005 CZ_{39}	—	February 4, 2005	Kitt Peak	Spacewatch	·	2.4 km	MPC · JPL
248195	2005 CP_{53}	—	February 3, 2005	Socorro	LINEAR	·	2.7 km	MPC · JPL
248196	2005 CL_{75}	—	February 2, 2005	Kitt Peak	Spacewatch	·	3.6 km	MPC · JPL
248197	2005 CE_{79}	—	February 1, 2005	Kitt Peak	Spacewatch	·	4.2 km	MPC · JPL
248198	2005 EH_{1}	—	March 2, 2005	Kitt Peak	Spacewatch	·	2.5 km	MPC · JPL
248199	2005 EG_{8}	—	March 1, 2005	Kitt Peak	Spacewatch	·	7.0 km	MPC · JPL
248200	2005 EY_{25}	—	March 3, 2005	Catalina	CSS	·	3.4 km	MPC · JPL

== 248201–248300 ==
back to top

Designation			Discovery			Properties		Ref
Permanent	Provisional	Named after	Date	Site	Discoverer(s)	Category	Diam.	Ref
248201	2005 ES_{26}	—	March 3, 2005	Catalina	CSS	·	3.9 km	MPC · JPL
248202	2005 EV_{35}	—	March 4, 2005	Catalina	CSS	DOR	3.4 km	MPC · JPL
248203	2005 EV_{38}	—	March 8, 2005	Mayhill	Lowe, A.	·	2.9 km	MPC · JPL
248204	2005 EA_{43}	—	March 3, 2005	Kitt Peak	Spacewatch	·	3.8 km	MPC · JPL
248205	2005 ED_{43}	—	March 3, 2005	Kitt Peak	Spacewatch	·	4.3 km	MPC · JPL
248206	2005 ET_{50}	—	March 3, 2005	Catalina	CSS	·	2.5 km	MPC · JPL
248207	2005 ED_{75}	—	March 3, 2005	Kitt Peak	Spacewatch	·	3.8 km	MPC · JPL
248208	2005 EP_{83}	—	March 4, 2005	Kitt Peak	Spacewatch	·	5.4 km	MPC · JPL
248209	2005 EW_{88}	—	March 8, 2005	Kitt Peak	Spacewatch	·	1.5 km	MPC · JPL
248210	2005 EE_{96}	—	March 3, 2005	Catalina	CSS	·	3.5 km	MPC · JPL
248211	2005 EF_{102}	—	March 3, 2005	Kitt Peak	Spacewatch	·	3.2 km	MPC · JPL
248212	2005 EN_{102}	—	March 3, 2005	Kitt Peak	Spacewatch	PHO	2.1 km	MPC · JPL
248213	2005 ES_{108}	—	March 4, 2005	Catalina	CSS	VER	5.7 km	MPC · JPL
248214	2005 ED_{117}	—	March 4, 2005	Mount Lemmon	Mount Lemmon Survey	HOF	3.1 km	MPC · JPL
248215	2005 EZ_{127}	—	March 9, 2005	Vail-Jarnac	Jarnac	DOR	3.7 km	MPC · JPL
248216	2005 EB_{130}	—	March 9, 2005	Kitt Peak	Spacewatch	·	4.0 km	MPC · JPL
248217	2005 ER_{160}	—	March 9, 2005	Mount Lemmon	Mount Lemmon Survey	·	4.5 km	MPC · JPL
248218	2005 EA_{170}	—	March 10, 2005	Mayhill	Lowe, A.	·	4.3 km	MPC · JPL
248219	2005 EC_{172}	—	March 7, 2005	Socorro	LINEAR	·	3.4 km	MPC · JPL
248220	2005 EK_{177}	—	March 8, 2005	Mount Lemmon	Mount Lemmon Survey	·	1.9 km	MPC · JPL
248221	2005 EF_{178}	—	March 9, 2005	Kitt Peak	Spacewatch	·	2.3 km	MPC · JPL
248222	2005 ER_{195}	—	March 11, 2005	Mount Lemmon	Mount Lemmon Survey	·	4.7 km	MPC · JPL
248223	2005 EK_{196}	—	March 11, 2005	Mount Lemmon	Mount Lemmon Survey	·	1.9 km	MPC · JPL
248224	2005 EU_{199}	—	March 12, 2005	Kitt Peak	Spacewatch	·	4.3 km	MPC · JPL
248225	2005 EL_{205}	—	March 12, 2005	Kitt Peak	Spacewatch	HOF	3.7 km	MPC · JPL
248226	2005 EO_{206}	—	March 13, 2005	Catalina	CSS	LUT	5.2 km	MPC · JPL
248227	2005 ES_{207}	—	March 12, 2005	Socorro	LINEAR	·	5.9 km	MPC · JPL
248228	2005 EA_{208}	—	March 4, 2005	Kitt Peak	Spacewatch	·	3.3 km	MPC · JPL
248229	2005 EU_{215}	—	March 8, 2005	Anderson Mesa	LONEOS	(1118)	5.9 km	MPC · JPL
248230 Sion	2005 ET_{216}	Sion	March 8, 2005	Mount Lemmon	Mount Lemmon Survey	·	2.2 km	MPC · JPL
248231	2005 EV_{217}	—	March 9, 2005	Mount Lemmon	Mount Lemmon Survey	·	2.0 km	MPC · JPL
248232	2005 EZ_{220}	—	March 11, 2005	Mount Lemmon	Mount Lemmon Survey	CLO	3.2 km	MPC · JPL
248233	2005 EG_{222}	—	March 7, 2005	Socorro	LINEAR	·	3.1 km	MPC · JPL
248234	2005 EN_{240}	—	March 11, 2005	Kitt Peak	Spacewatch	(5)	1.6 km	MPC · JPL
248235	2005 EJ_{242}	—	March 11, 2005	Catalina	CSS	·	3.6 km	MPC · JPL
248236	2005 EE_{246}	—	March 12, 2005	Kitt Peak	Spacewatch	EUN	1.2 km	MPC · JPL
248237	2005 ER_{247}	—	March 12, 2005	Kitt Peak	Spacewatch	·	4.6 km	MPC · JPL
248238	2005 EQ_{249}	—	March 13, 2005	Mount Lemmon	Mount Lemmon Survey	L5	18 km	MPC · JPL
248239	2005 EW_{278}	—	March 9, 2005	Mount Lemmon	Mount Lemmon Survey	·	2.6 km	MPC · JPL
248240	2005 ET_{281}	—	March 10, 2005	Catalina	CSS	·	2.8 km	MPC · JPL
248241	2005 ER_{283}	—	March 11, 2005	Catalina	CSS	·	4.8 km	MPC · JPL
248242	2005 EA_{286}	—	March 1, 2005	Catalina	CSS	·	4.9 km	MPC · JPL
248243	2005 EE_{331}	—	March 13, 2005	Catalina	CSS	DOR	3.0 km	MPC · JPL
248244	2005 FO_{2}	—	March 17, 2005	Kitt Peak	Spacewatch	·	3.2 km	MPC · JPL
248245	2005 FQ_{5}	—	March 30, 2005	Goodricke-Pigott	Kumar, P.	·	4.0 km	MPC · JPL
248246	2005 GD_{10}	—	April 4, 2005	Vail-Jarnac	Jarnac	·	3.0 km	MPC · JPL
248247	2005 GO_{14}	—	April 2, 2005	Kitt Peak	Spacewatch	·	1.8 km	MPC · JPL
248248	2005 GH_{19}	—	April 2, 2005	Mount Lemmon	Mount Lemmon Survey	·	5.3 km	MPC · JPL
248249	2005 GX_{19}	—	April 2, 2005	Mount Lemmon	Mount Lemmon Survey	·	1.8 km	MPC · JPL
248250	2005 GS_{20}	—	April 2, 2005	Mount Lemmon	Mount Lemmon Survey	·	5.0 km	MPC · JPL
248251	2005 GO_{23}	—	April 1, 2005	Anderson Mesa	LONEOS	·	3.1 km	MPC · JPL
248252	2005 GQ_{23}	—	April 1, 2005	Goodricke-Pigott	Reddy, V.	·	2.8 km	MPC · JPL
248253	2005 GW_{27}	—	April 3, 2005	Palomar	NEAT	·	1.5 km	MPC · JPL
248254	2005 GV_{37}	—	April 2, 2005	Siding Spring	SSS	·	4.7 km	MPC · JPL
248255	2005 GP_{50}	—	April 5, 2005	Kitt Peak	Spacewatch	·	2.4 km	MPC · JPL
248256	2005 GN_{64}	—	April 2, 2005	Anderson Mesa	LONEOS	·	3.2 km	MPC · JPL
248257	2005 GR_{67}	—	April 2, 2005	Mount Lemmon	Mount Lemmon Survey	·	3.4 km	MPC · JPL
248258	2005 GL_{71}	—	April 4, 2005	Catalina	CSS	HYG	4.6 km	MPC · JPL
248259	2005 GK_{73}	—	April 4, 2005	Catalina	CSS	(5651)	4.5 km	MPC · JPL
248260	2005 GX_{93}	—	April 6, 2005	Kitt Peak	Spacewatch	·	5.2 km	MPC · JPL
248261	2005 GS_{112}	—	April 6, 2005	Kitt Peak	Spacewatch	·	5.2 km	MPC · JPL
248262 Liuxiaobo	2005 GR_{128}	Liuxiaobo	April 4, 2005	Vallemare Borbona	Borbona, Vallemare	·	3.4 km	MPC · JPL
248263	2005 GZ_{141}	—	April 10, 2005	Kitt Peak	Spacewatch	VER	3.9 km	MPC · JPL
248264	2005 GU_{149}	—	April 11, 2005	Kitt Peak	Spacewatch	·	2.2 km	MPC · JPL
248265	2005 GG_{154}	—	April 8, 2005	Socorro	LINEAR	·	4.9 km	MPC · JPL
248266	2005 GC_{161}	—	April 13, 2005	Socorro	LINEAR	·	3.8 km	MPC · JPL
248267	2005 GU_{170}	—	April 12, 2005	Anderson Mesa	LONEOS	·	3.2 km	MPC · JPL
248268	2005 GU_{180}	—	April 12, 2005	Kitt Peak	Spacewatch	URS	4.5 km	MPC · JPL
248269	2005 HK_{3}	—	April 18, 2005	Catalina	CSS	·	2.8 km	MPC · JPL
248270	2005 HE_{6}	—	April 30, 2005	Kitt Peak	Spacewatch	·	1.7 km	MPC · JPL
248271	2005 HY_{6}	—	April 30, 2005	Siding Spring	SSS	·	1.8 km	MPC · JPL
248272	2005 JE_{2}	—	May 2, 2005	Kitt Peak	Spacewatch	JUN	2.0 km	MPC · JPL
248273	2005 JM_{2}	—	May 3, 2005	Kitt Peak	Spacewatch	·	2.3 km	MPC · JPL
248274	2005 JG_{15}	—	May 2, 2005	Kitt Peak	Spacewatch	·	2.9 km	MPC · JPL
248275	2005 JZ_{16}	—	May 4, 2005	Palomar	NEAT	·	3.4 km	MPC · JPL
248276	2005 JP_{41}	—	May 7, 2005	Mount Lemmon	Mount Lemmon Survey	·	1.8 km	MPC · JPL
248277	2005 JU_{42}	—	May 8, 2005	Catalina	CSS	·	2.9 km	MPC · JPL
248278	2005 JW_{44}	—	May 4, 2005	Catalina	CSS	·	2.4 km	MPC · JPL
248279	2005 JL_{60}	—	May 8, 2005	Kitt Peak	Spacewatch	·	1.3 km	MPC · JPL
248280	2005 JL_{64}	—	May 4, 2005	Palomar	NEAT	JUN	1.7 km	MPC · JPL
248281	2005 JD_{84}	—	May 8, 2005	Kitt Peak	Spacewatch	·	1.7 km	MPC · JPL
248282	2005 JL_{98}	—	May 8, 2005	Socorro	LINEAR	·	2.2 km	MPC · JPL
248283	2005 JC_{99}	—	May 9, 2005	Mount Lemmon	Mount Lemmon Survey	HYG	4.3 km	MPC · JPL
248284	2005 JS_{113}	—	May 10, 2005	Kitt Peak	Spacewatch	·	3.3 km	MPC · JPL
248285	2005 JY_{119}	—	May 10, 2005	Kitt Peak	Spacewatch	·	1.5 km	MPC · JPL
248286	2005 JX_{130}	—	May 13, 2005	Kitt Peak	Spacewatch	·	2.8 km	MPC · JPL
248287	2005 JA_{136}	—	May 11, 2005	Catalina	CSS	·	5.5 km	MPC · JPL
248288	2005 JG_{138}	—	May 13, 2005	Kitt Peak	Spacewatch	·	1.5 km	MPC · JPL
248289	2005 KM	—	May 16, 2005	Mount Lemmon	Mount Lemmon Survey	·	2.1 km	MPC · JPL
248290	2005 KU_{9}	—	May 29, 2005	Reedy Creek	J. Broughton	·	4.5 km	MPC · JPL
248291	2005 KS_{10}	—	May 30, 2005	Catalina	CSS	·	4.0 km	MPC · JPL
248292	2005 KV_{11}	—	May 28, 2005	Reedy Creek	J. Broughton	·	3.1 km	MPC · JPL
248293	2005 LN_{1}	—	June 1, 2005	Mount Lemmon	Mount Lemmon Survey	·	5.6 km	MPC · JPL
248294	2005 LZ_{2}	—	June 2, 2005	Catalina	CSS	·	3.9 km	MPC · JPL
248295	2005 LY_{3}	—	June 4, 2005	Reedy Creek	J. Broughton	·	2.4 km	MPC · JPL
248296	2005 LK_{9}	—	June 1, 2005	Kitt Peak	Spacewatch	·	4.8 km	MPC · JPL
248297	2005 LL_{14}	—	June 5, 2005	Kitt Peak	Spacewatch	·	2.9 km	MPC · JPL
248298	2005 LX_{19}	—	June 9, 2005	Siding Spring	SSS	·	2.3 km	MPC · JPL
248299	2005 LS_{22}	—	June 8, 2005	Kitt Peak	Spacewatch	·	5.4 km	MPC · JPL
248300	2005 LP_{23}	—	June 10, 2005	Kitt Peak	Spacewatch	EUN	1.6 km	MPC · JPL

== 248301–248400 ==
back to top

Designation			Discovery			Properties		Ref
Permanent	Provisional	Named after	Date	Site	Discoverer(s)	Category	Diam.	Ref
248301	2005 LA_{25}	—	June 8, 2005	Kitt Peak	Spacewatch	·	3.5 km	MPC · JPL
248302	2005 LZ_{37}	—	June 11, 2005	Kitt Peak	Spacewatch	·	1.8 km	MPC · JPL
248303	2005 LC_{48}	—	June 5, 2005	Reedy Creek	J. Broughton	·	3.6 km	MPC · JPL
248304	2005 MS_{1}	—	June 17, 2005	Mount Lemmon	Mount Lemmon Survey	·	3.1 km	MPC · JPL
248305	2005 MC_{41}	—	June 30, 2005	Kitt Peak	Spacewatch	·	2.7 km	MPC · JPL
248306	2005 MP_{42}	—	June 29, 2005	Kitt Peak	Spacewatch	·	2.7 km	MPC · JPL
248307	2005 MW_{54}	—	June 30, 2005	Kitt Peak	Spacewatch	EOS	2.5 km	MPC · JPL
248308	2005 NQ_{11}	—	July 4, 2005	Palomar	NEAT	·	3.5 km	MPC · JPL
248309	2005 ND_{17}	—	July 3, 2005	Palomar	NEAT	·	4.6 km	MPC · JPL
248310	2005 NJ_{22}	—	July 1, 2005	Kitt Peak	Spacewatch	·	3.5 km	MPC · JPL
248311	2005 NM_{28}	—	July 5, 2005	Palomar	NEAT	·	2.0 km	MPC · JPL
248312	2005 NL_{36}	—	July 6, 2005	Kitt Peak	Spacewatch	·	2.8 km	MPC · JPL
248313	2005 NE_{60}	—	July 9, 2005	Kitt Peak	Spacewatch	PAL	2.5 km	MPC · JPL
248314	2005 NB_{69}	—	July 3, 2005	Palomar	NEAT	·	2.0 km	MPC · JPL
248315	2005 OF_{1}	—	July 19, 2005	Palomar	NEAT	·	6.1 km	MPC · JPL
248316	2005 OO_{10}	—	July 27, 2005	Palomar	NEAT	·	2.8 km	MPC · JPL
248317	2005 OL_{27}	—	July 31, 2005	Palomar	NEAT	EOS	4.1 km	MPC · JPL
248318	2005 PF_{2}	—	August 2, 2005	Socorro	LINEAR	·	1.8 km	MPC · JPL
248319	2005 PJ_{6}	—	August 7, 2005	Reedy Creek	J. Broughton	·	4.0 km	MPC · JPL
248320	2005 PY_{15}	—	August 4, 2005	Palomar	NEAT	·	2.5 km	MPC · JPL
248321 Cester	2005 PL_{20}	Cester	August 14, 2005	Vallemare Borbona	V. S. Casulli	·	1.7 km	MPC · JPL
248322	2005 PY_{28}	—	August 6, 2005	Siding Spring	SSS	·	4.3 km	MPC · JPL
248323	2005 QD_{2}	—	August 23, 2005	Haleakala	NEAT	·	1.9 km	MPC · JPL
248324	2005 QX_{7}	—	August 24, 2005	Palomar	NEAT	·	6.0 km	MPC · JPL
248325	2005 QS_{12}	—	August 24, 2005	Palomar	NEAT	EOS	3.1 km	MPC · JPL
248326	2005 QA_{14}	—	August 24, 2005	Palomar	NEAT	HOF	4.3 km	MPC · JPL
248327	2005 QD_{14}	—	August 24, 2005	Palomar	NEAT	·	3.2 km	MPC · JPL
248328	2005 QL_{18}	—	August 25, 2005	Palomar	NEAT	THM · fast	3.2 km	MPC · JPL
248329	2005 QO_{31}	—	August 22, 2005	Haleakala	NEAT	·	4.1 km	MPC · JPL
248330	2005 QL_{35}	—	August 25, 2005	Palomar	NEAT	·	3.4 km	MPC · JPL
248331	2005 QP_{38}	—	August 25, 2005	Campo Imperatore	CINEOS	EUP	6.0 km	MPC · JPL
248332	2005 QM_{41}	—	August 26, 2005	Anderson Mesa	LONEOS	·	4.6 km	MPC · JPL
248333	2005 QS_{43}	—	August 26, 2005	Palomar	NEAT	·	3.1 km	MPC · JPL
248334	2005 QN_{53}	—	August 28, 2005	Kitt Peak	Spacewatch	·	3.9 km	MPC · JPL
248335	2005 QB_{59}	—	August 25, 2005	Palomar	NEAT	EOS	2.7 km	MPC · JPL
248336	2005 QO_{69}	—	August 28, 2005	Siding Spring	SSS	·	3.3 km	MPC · JPL
248337	2005 QL_{71}	—	August 29, 2005	Socorro	LINEAR	H	930 m	MPC · JPL
248338	2005 QW_{82}	—	August 29, 2005	Anderson Mesa	LONEOS	·	6.1 km	MPC · JPL
248339	2005 QA_{83}	—	August 29, 2005	Anderson Mesa	LONEOS	·	3.1 km	MPC · JPL
248340	2005 QB_{84}	—	August 29, 2005	Anderson Mesa	LONEOS	HOF ·	4.5 km	MPC · JPL
248341	2005 QA_{87}	—	August 30, 2005	Socorro	LINEAR	EUP	4.7 km	MPC · JPL
248342	2005 QZ_{87}	—	August 29, 2005	Bergisch Gladbach	W. Bickel	HOF	3.7 km	MPC · JPL
248343	2005 QY_{93}	—	August 26, 2005	Palomar	NEAT	·	3.9 km	MPC · JPL
248344	2005 QE_{107}	—	August 27, 2005	Palomar	NEAT	·	4.2 km	MPC · JPL
248345	2005 QF_{108}	—	August 27, 2005	Palomar	NEAT	EOS ·	3.6 km	MPC · JPL
248346	2005 QD_{111}	—	August 27, 2005	Palomar	NEAT	HOF	3.0 km	MPC · JPL
248347	2005 QP_{111}	—	August 27, 2005	Palomar	NEAT	NEM	3.5 km	MPC · JPL
248348	2005 QH_{114}	—	August 27, 2005	Palomar	NEAT	·	4.9 km	MPC · JPL
248349	2005 QY_{117}	—	August 28, 2005	Kitt Peak	Spacewatch	·	2.7 km	MPC · JPL
248350	2005 QE_{125}	—	August 28, 2005	Kitt Peak	Spacewatch	·	3.4 km	MPC · JPL
248351	2005 QR_{129}	—	August 28, 2005	Kitt Peak	Spacewatch	VER	3.9 km	MPC · JPL
248352	2005 QV_{130}	—	August 28, 2005	Kitt Peak	Spacewatch	·	5.3 km	MPC · JPL
248353	2005 QJ_{132}	—	August 28, 2005	Kitt Peak	Spacewatch	·	4.7 km	MPC · JPL
248354	2005 QY_{136}	—	August 28, 2005	Kitt Peak	Spacewatch	·	2.3 km	MPC · JPL
248355	2005 QD_{142}	—	August 30, 2005	Socorro	LINEAR	·	6.0 km	MPC · JPL
248356	2005 QC_{143}	—	August 31, 2005	Anderson Mesa	LONEOS	LIX	5.2 km	MPC · JPL
248357	2005 QD_{146}	—	August 28, 2005	Anderson Mesa	LONEOS	·	3.6 km	MPC · JPL
248358	2005 QV_{147}	—	August 28, 2005	Siding Spring	SSS	·	2.7 km	MPC · JPL
248359	2005 QQ_{150}	—	August 28, 2005	Siding Spring	SSS	·	3.6 km	MPC · JPL
248360	2005 QW_{157}	—	August 26, 2005	Palomar	NEAT	·	3.0 km	MPC · JPL
248361	2005 QV_{160}	—	August 28, 2005	Kitt Peak	Spacewatch	EOS	4.3 km	MPC · JPL
248362	2005 QQ_{161}	—	August 28, 2005	Siding Spring	SSS	·	2.9 km	MPC · JPL
248363	2005 QK_{164}	—	August 31, 2005	Palomar	NEAT	EUP	5.4 km	MPC · JPL
248364	2005 QO_{166}	—	August 26, 2005	Campo Imperatore	CINEOS	·	6.2 km	MPC · JPL
248365	2005 QB_{168}	—	August 29, 2005	Palomar	NEAT	DOR	4.3 km	MPC · JPL
248366	2005 QQ_{169}	—	August 29, 2005	Palomar	NEAT	·	3.8 km	MPC · JPL
248367	2005 QG_{170}	—	August 29, 2005	Palomar	NEAT	·	5.8 km	MPC · JPL
248368	2005 QO_{170}	—	August 29, 2005	Palomar	NEAT	·	3.8 km	MPC · JPL
248369	2005 QG_{173}	—	August 29, 2005	Palomar	NEAT	VER	3.6 km	MPC · JPL
248370	2005 QN_{173}	—	August 29, 2005	Palomar	NEAT	Comet (433P)	3.6 km	MPC · JPL
248371	2005 QA_{180}	—	August 26, 2005	Palomar	NEAT	EOS ·	4.9 km	MPC · JPL
248372	2005 QD_{189}	—	August 24, 2005	Palomar	NEAT	·	3.4 km	MPC · JPL
248373	2005 RT_{7}	—	September 8, 2005	Socorro	LINEAR	·	5.2 km	MPC · JPL
248374	2005 RF_{11}	—	September 10, 2005	Anderson Mesa	LONEOS	·	3.7 km	MPC · JPL
248375	2005 RA_{19}	—	September 1, 2005	Kitt Peak	Spacewatch	·	2.6 km	MPC · JPL
248376	2005 RV_{20}	—	September 1, 2005	Palomar	NEAT	·	6.3 km	MPC · JPL
248377	2005 RV_{26}	—	September 9, 2005	Socorro	LINEAR	·	5.1 km	MPC · JPL
248378	2005 RQ_{27}	—	September 10, 2005	Anderson Mesa	LONEOS	·	3.6 km	MPC · JPL
248379	2005 RT_{27}	—	September 10, 2005	Anderson Mesa	LONEOS	·	2.9 km	MPC · JPL
248380	2005 RE_{28}	—	September 11, 2005	Anderson Mesa	LONEOS	LIX	6.1 km	MPC · JPL
248381	2005 SF_{1}	—	September 23, 2005	Hormersdorf	Lorenz, J.	·	2.4 km	MPC · JPL
248382	2005 SY_{6}	—	September 23, 2005	Kitt Peak	Spacewatch	·	4.9 km	MPC · JPL
248383	2005 SG_{10}	—	September 26, 2005	Socorro	LINEAR	·	7.5 km	MPC · JPL
248384	2005 SM_{11}	—	September 23, 2005	Kitt Peak	Spacewatch	THM	3.3 km	MPC · JPL
248385	2005 SJ_{14}	—	September 24, 2005	Anderson Mesa	LONEOS	EUP	6.2 km	MPC · JPL
248386	2005 SK_{14}	—	September 24, 2005	Anderson Mesa	LONEOS	(69559)	6.5 km	MPC · JPL
248387	2005 SB_{19}	—	September 26, 2005	Palomar	NEAT	LIX	4.7 km	MPC · JPL
248388 Namtso	2005 SE_{19}	Namtso	September 26, 2005	Vallemare Borbona	V. S. Casulli	·	3.0 km	MPC · JPL
248389	2005 SV_{21}	—	September 23, 2005	Cordell-Lorenz	D. T. Durig	·	4.4 km	MPC · JPL
248390	2005 SK_{23}	—	September 23, 2005	Catalina	CSS	·	3.5 km	MPC · JPL
248391	2005 SV_{23}	—	September 23, 2005	Catalina	CSS	·	5.2 km	MPC · JPL
248392	2005 SY_{34}	—	September 23, 2005	Kitt Peak	Spacewatch	·	5.6 km	MPC · JPL
248393	2005 SR_{37}	—	September 24, 2005	Kitt Peak	Spacewatch	HYG	3.2 km	MPC · JPL
248394	2005 SM_{38}	—	September 24, 2005	Kitt Peak	Spacewatch	·	4.8 km	MPC · JPL
248395	2005 SG_{46}	—	September 24, 2005	Kitt Peak	Spacewatch	·	4.5 km	MPC · JPL
248396	2005 SM_{60}	—	September 26, 2005	Palomar	NEAT	·	3.5 km	MPC · JPL
248397	2005 SN_{65}	—	September 26, 2005	Palomar	NEAT	·	3.2 km	MPC · JPL
248398	2005 SW_{69}	—	September 27, 2005	Palomar	NEAT	·	3.3 km	MPC · JPL
248399	2005 SC_{73}	—	September 23, 2005	Catalina	CSS	LIX	4.2 km	MPC · JPL
248400	2005 ST_{73}	—	September 23, 2005	Catalina	CSS	·	3.3 km	MPC · JPL

== 248401–248500 ==
back to top

Designation			Discovery			Properties		Ref
Permanent	Provisional	Named after	Date	Site	Discoverer(s)	Category	Diam.	Ref
248401	2005 SP_{75}	—	September 24, 2005	Kitt Peak	Spacewatch	·	4.1 km	MPC · JPL
248402	2005 SC_{97}	—	September 25, 2005	Kitt Peak	Spacewatch	THM · fast	4.3 km	MPC · JPL
248403	2005 SJ_{99}	—	September 25, 2005	Kitt Peak	Spacewatch	·	5.4 km	MPC · JPL
248404	2005 SQ_{102}	—	September 25, 2005	Kitt Peak	Spacewatch	HYG	3.1 km	MPC · JPL
248405	2005 SL_{103}	—	September 25, 2005	Palomar	NEAT	HYG	3.2 km	MPC · JPL
248406	2005 SJ_{105}	—	September 25, 2005	Kitt Peak	Spacewatch	·	3.6 km	MPC · JPL
248407	2005 SO_{118}	—	September 28, 2005	Palomar	NEAT	·	2.9 km	MPC · JPL
248408	2005 SG_{121}	—	September 29, 2005	Kitt Peak	Spacewatch	·	2.3 km	MPC · JPL
248409	2005 SN_{141}	—	September 25, 2005	Kitt Peak	Spacewatch	·	3.8 km	MPC · JPL
248410	2005 SM_{152}	—	September 25, 2005	Kitt Peak	Spacewatch	·	1.4 km	MPC · JPL
248411	2005 SV_{159}	—	September 26, 2005	Palomar	NEAT	·	6.2 km	MPC · JPL
248412	2005 SE_{165}	—	September 28, 2005	Palomar	NEAT	·	4.5 km	MPC · JPL
248413	2005 SM_{169}	—	September 29, 2005	Kitt Peak	Spacewatch	·	1.8 km	MPC · JPL
248414	2005 SN_{177}	—	September 29, 2005	Kitt Peak	Spacewatch	·	4.9 km	MPC · JPL
248415	2005 ST_{180}	—	September 29, 2005	Mount Lemmon	Mount Lemmon Survey	·	3.9 km	MPC · JPL
248416	2005 SS_{187}	—	September 29, 2005	Anderson Mesa	LONEOS	·	3.3 km	MPC · JPL
248417	2005 SK_{204}	—	September 30, 2005	Mount Lemmon	Mount Lemmon Survey	·	3.9 km	MPC · JPL
248418	2005 ST_{205}	—	September 30, 2005	Anderson Mesa	LONEOS	·	3.1 km	MPC · JPL
248419	2005 SX_{205}	—	September 30, 2005	Palomar	NEAT	·	6.1 km	MPC · JPL
248420	2005 SG_{206}	—	September 30, 2005	Anderson Mesa	LONEOS	·	5.2 km	MPC · JPL
248421	2005 SK_{215}	—	September 30, 2005	Catalina	CSS	·	5.2 km	MPC · JPL
248422	2005 SL_{217}	—	September 30, 2005	Palomar	NEAT	·	2.4 km	MPC · JPL
248423	2005 SE_{218}	—	September 30, 2005	Palomar	NEAT	·	4.7 km	MPC · JPL
248424	2005 SW_{220}	—	September 29, 2005	Catalina	CSS	·	5.5 km	MPC · JPL
248425	2005 SZ_{255}	—	September 22, 2005	Palomar	NEAT	URS	5.4 km	MPC · JPL
248426	2005 SP_{257}	—	September 18, 2005	Palomar	NEAT	EOS	3.3 km	MPC · JPL
248427	2005 SW_{260}	—	September 24, 2005	Kitt Peak	Spacewatch	LUT	6.7 km	MPC · JPL
248428	2005 SK_{269}	—	September 26, 2005	Catalina	CSS	·	3.8 km	MPC · JPL
248429	2005 SS_{280}	—	September 29, 2005	Catalina	CSS	·	3.9 km	MPC · JPL
248430	2005 SM_{284}	—	September 25, 2005	Apache Point	A. C. Becker	HIL · 3:2 · (6124)	5.6 km	MPC · JPL
248431	2005 TB_{2}	—	October 1, 2005	Mount Lemmon	Mount Lemmon Survey	·	4.3 km	MPC · JPL
248432	2005 TO_{5}	—	October 1, 2005	Catalina	CSS	EOS	2.9 km	MPC · JPL
248433	2005 TY_{9}	—	October 2, 2005	Palomar	NEAT	VER	3.9 km	MPC · JPL
248434	2005 TW_{12}	—	October 2, 2005	Palomar	NEAT	·	4.4 km	MPC · JPL
248435	2005 TM_{22}	—	October 1, 2005	Catalina	CSS	·	3.2 km	MPC · JPL
248436	2005 TN_{23}	—	October 1, 2005	Socorro	LINEAR	EUP	6.1 km	MPC · JPL
248437	2005 TL_{25}	—	October 1, 2005	Mount Lemmon	Mount Lemmon Survey	THM	4.7 km	MPC · JPL
248438	2005 TS_{36}	—	October 1, 2005	Socorro	LINEAR	·	4.2 km	MPC · JPL
248439	2005 TY_{40}	—	October 1, 2005	Mount Lemmon	Mount Lemmon Survey	HYG	5.6 km	MPC · JPL
248440	2005 TN_{51}	—	October 12, 2005	Bergisch Gladbach	W. Bickel	·	4.0 km	MPC · JPL
248441	2005 TC_{55}	—	October 5, 2005	Socorro	LINEAR	AST	3.1 km	MPC · JPL
248442	2005 TR_{57}	—	October 1, 2005	Mount Lemmon	Mount Lemmon Survey	HYG	3.0 km	MPC · JPL
248443	2005 TK_{61}	—	October 3, 2005	Catalina	CSS	HYG	3.8 km	MPC · JPL
248444	2005 TT_{72}	—	October 5, 2005	Catalina	CSS	·	5.3 km	MPC · JPL
248445	2005 TC_{73}	—	October 5, 2005	Catalina	CSS	·	2.5 km	MPC · JPL
248446	2005 TS_{76}	—	October 5, 2005	Catalina	CSS	·	4.1 km	MPC · JPL
248447	2005 TL_{104}	—	October 8, 2005	Socorro	LINEAR	·	5.2 km	MPC · JPL
248448	2005 TT_{104}	—	October 8, 2005	Catalina	CSS	·	4.9 km	MPC · JPL
248449	2005 TJ_{118}	—	October 7, 2005	Kitt Peak	Spacewatch	·	3.3 km	MPC · JPL
248450	2005 TF_{133}	—	October 8, 2005	Catalina	CSS	·	4.7 km	MPC · JPL
248451	2005 TH_{152}	—	October 11, 2005	Kitt Peak	Spacewatch	·	7.0 km	MPC · JPL
248452	2005 TR_{161}	—	October 9, 2005	Kitt Peak	Spacewatch	ERI	2.4 km	MPC · JPL
248453	2005 TX_{172}	—	October 13, 2005	Socorro	LINEAR	·	4.8 km	MPC · JPL
248454	2005 TN_{177}	—	October 4, 2005	Palomar	NEAT	·	6.0 km	MPC · JPL
248455	2005 TJ_{189}	—	October 14, 2005	Anderson Mesa	LONEOS	·	4.8 km	MPC · JPL
248456	2005 TM_{193}	—	October 5, 2005	Catalina	CSS	·	5.5 km	MPC · JPL
248457	2005 UU_{12}	—	October 21, 2005	Palomar	NEAT	·	4.0 km	MPC · JPL
248458	2005 UK_{30}	—	October 23, 2005	Catalina	CSS	·	3.7 km	MPC · JPL
248459	2005 UJ_{35}	—	October 24, 2005	Kitt Peak	Spacewatch	·	2.9 km	MPC · JPL
248460	2005 UP_{39}	—	October 24, 2005	Kitt Peak	Spacewatch	EOS	3.1 km	MPC · JPL
248461	2005 UU_{53}	—	October 23, 2005	Catalina	CSS	·	5.2 km	MPC · JPL
248462	2005 UD_{54}	—	October 23, 2005	Catalina	CSS	EOS	3.4 km	MPC · JPL
248463	2005 UN_{55}	—	October 23, 2005	Catalina	CSS	EOS	3.0 km	MPC · JPL
248464	2005 UM_{66}	—	October 22, 2005	Kitt Peak	Spacewatch	·	3.2 km	MPC · JPL
248465	2005 UT_{69}	—	October 23, 2005	Catalina	CSS	·	5.2 km	MPC · JPL
248466	2005 UT_{71}	—	October 23, 2005	Catalina	CSS	·	5.3 km	MPC · JPL
248467	2005 UY_{74}	—	October 23, 2005	Catalina	CSS	·	5.5 km	MPC · JPL
248468	2005 UT_{75}	—	October 24, 2005	Palomar	NEAT	·	7.4 km	MPC · JPL
248469	2005 US_{78}	—	October 25, 2005	Catalina	CSS	·	4.7 km	MPC · JPL
248470	2005 UM_{81}	—	October 20, 2005	Palomar	NEAT	·	3.3 km	MPC · JPL
248471	2005 UO_{81}	—	October 20, 2005	Palomar	NEAT	·	5.4 km	MPC · JPL
248472	2005 UY_{82}	—	October 22, 2005	Kitt Peak	Spacewatch	·	3.6 km	MPC · JPL
248473	2005 UZ_{84}	—	October 22, 2005	Kitt Peak	Spacewatch	·	3.4 km	MPC · JPL
248474	2005 UK_{100}	—	October 22, 2005	Kitt Peak	Spacewatch	·	3.8 km	MPC · JPL
248475	2005 UE_{105}	—	October 22, 2005	Kitt Peak	Spacewatch	·	2.9 km	MPC · JPL
248476	2005 UN_{112}	—	October 22, 2005	Kitt Peak	Spacewatch	TIR	2.3 km	MPC · JPL
248477	2005 UF_{121}	—	October 24, 2005	Kitt Peak	Spacewatch	T_{j} (2.98)	5.4 km	MPC · JPL
248478	2005 UH_{126}	—	October 24, 2005	Kitt Peak	Spacewatch	THM	4.0 km	MPC · JPL
248479	2005 UQ_{159}	—	October 21, 2005	Palomar	NEAT	·	4.2 km	MPC · JPL
248480	2005 UL_{167}	—	October 24, 2005	Kitt Peak	Spacewatch	·	5.5 km	MPC · JPL
248481	2005 UB_{211}	—	October 27, 2005	Kitt Peak	Spacewatch	·	2.8 km	MPC · JPL
248482	2005 UE_{215}	—	October 27, 2005	Palomar	NEAT	·	4.6 km	MPC · JPL
248483	2005 UG_{216}	—	October 25, 2005	Kitt Peak	Spacewatch	·	5.1 km	MPC · JPL
248484	2005 UU_{237}	—	October 25, 2005	Kitt Peak	Spacewatch	CYB	6.5 km	MPC · JPL
248485	2005 UM_{243}	—	October 25, 2005	Kitt Peak	Spacewatch	CYB	5.0 km	MPC · JPL
248486	2005 UY_{261}	—	October 26, 2005	Kitt Peak	Spacewatch	·	3.5 km	MPC · JPL
248487	2005 UA_{273}	—	October 28, 2005	Kitt Peak	Spacewatch	·	5.1 km	MPC · JPL
248488	2005 UH_{292}	—	October 26, 2005	Kitt Peak	Spacewatch	·	2.0 km	MPC · JPL
248489	2005 UA_{295}	—	October 26, 2005	Kitt Peak	Spacewatch	·	2.9 km	MPC · JPL
248490	2005 UK_{308}	—	October 27, 2005	Mount Lemmon	Mount Lemmon Survey	·	3.3 km	MPC · JPL
248491	2005 UA_{349}	—	October 25, 2005	Catalina	CSS	·	6.3 km	MPC · JPL
248492	2005 UH_{350}	—	October 28, 2005	Catalina	CSS	EUP	5.4 km	MPC · JPL
248493	2005 UF_{352}	—	October 29, 2005	Catalina	CSS	EOS	4.0 km	MPC · JPL
248494	2005 UJ_{360}	—	October 25, 2005	Kitt Peak	Spacewatch	·	5.7 km	MPC · JPL
248495	2005 UK_{360}	—	October 25, 2005	Kitt Peak	Spacewatch	·	5.2 km	MPC · JPL
248496	2005 UQ_{365}	—	October 27, 2005	Kitt Peak	Spacewatch	·	3.9 km	MPC · JPL
248497	2005 UB_{397}	—	October 27, 2005	Catalina	CSS	·	5.0 km	MPC · JPL
248498	2005 UO_{399}	—	October 25, 2005	Anderson Mesa	LONEOS	·	1.6 km	MPC · JPL
248499	2005 UN_{445}	—	October 31, 2005	Catalina	CSS	·	4.8 km	MPC · JPL
248500	2005 UK_{448}	—	October 30, 2005	Socorro	LINEAR	·	4.9 km	MPC · JPL

== 248501–248600 ==
back to top

Designation			Discovery			Properties		Ref
Permanent	Provisional	Named after	Date	Site	Discoverer(s)	Category	Diam.	Ref
248501	2005 UX_{478}	—	October 28, 2005	Catalina	CSS	·	4.6 km	MPC · JPL
248502	2005 UJ_{480}	—	October 31, 2005	Catalina	CSS	·	5.9 km	MPC · JPL
248503	2005 UN_{480}	—	October 23, 2005	Catalina	CSS	slow	5.2 km	MPC · JPL
248504	2005 UO_{481}	—	October 30, 2005	Catalina	CSS	·	5.6 km	MPC · JPL
248505	2005 UU_{482}	—	October 22, 2005	Palomar	NEAT	THM	5.1 km	MPC · JPL
248506	2005 UJ_{492}	—	October 24, 2005	Palomar	NEAT	·	3.6 km	MPC · JPL
248507	2005 UN_{496}	—	October 26, 2005	Palomar	NEAT	EOS	2.9 km	MPC · JPL
248508	2005 UY_{504}	—	October 24, 2005	Mauna Kea	D. J. Tholen	·	1.9 km	MPC · JPL
248509	2005 UT_{514}	—	October 20, 2005	Apache Point	A. C. Becker	·	3.0 km	MPC · JPL
248510	2005 UN_{519}	—	October 26, 2005	Apache Point	A. C. Becker	·	3.6 km	MPC · JPL
248511	2005 VN_{14}	—	November 3, 2005	Socorro	LINEAR	·	5.9 km	MPC · JPL
248512	2005 VG_{17}	—	November 4, 2005	Socorro	LINEAR	EOS	3.7 km	MPC · JPL
248513	2005 VC_{53}	—	November 3, 2005	Mount Lemmon	Mount Lemmon Survey	·	3.8 km	MPC · JPL
248514	2005 VV_{76}	—	November 4, 2005	Anderson Mesa	LONEOS	PHO	1.8 km	MPC · JPL
248515	2005 VX_{77}	—	November 6, 2005	Socorro	LINEAR	·	5.4 km	MPC · JPL
248516	2005 VU_{82}	—	November 3, 2005	Kitt Peak	Spacewatch	·	2.0 km	MPC · JPL
248517	2005 VA_{121}	—	November 12, 2005	Catalina	CSS	·	1.8 km	MPC · JPL
248518	2005 WC_{10}	—	November 21, 2005	Kitt Peak	Spacewatch	·	3.2 km	MPC · JPL
248519	2005 WB_{18}	—	November 22, 2005	Kitt Peak	Spacewatch	·	3.2 km	MPC · JPL
248520	2005 WY_{25}	—	November 21, 2005	Kitt Peak	Spacewatch	EMA	4.6 km	MPC · JPL
248521	2005 WL_{54}	—	November 21, 2005	Catalina	CSS	H	850 m	MPC · JPL
248522	2005 WS_{60}	—	November 25, 2005	Palomar	NEAT	·	4.2 km	MPC · JPL
248523	2005 WG_{88}	—	November 28, 2005	Mount Lemmon	Mount Lemmon Survey	THM	3.0 km	MPC · JPL
248524	2005 WC_{98}	—	November 26, 2005	Kitt Peak	Spacewatch	·	5.6 km	MPC · JPL
248525	2005 WA_{105}	—	November 29, 2005	Catalina	CSS	·	3.2 km	MPC · JPL
248526	2005 WR_{108}	—	November 29, 2005	Socorro	LINEAR	·	7.3 km	MPC · JPL
248527	2005 WC_{121}	—	November 30, 2005	Socorro	LINEAR	·	2.6 km	MPC · JPL
248528	2005 WY_{121}	—	November 30, 2005	Mount Lemmon	Mount Lemmon Survey	T_{j} (2.99) · EUP	8.0 km	MPC · JPL
248529	2005 WU_{134}	—	November 25, 2005	Mount Lemmon	Mount Lemmon Survey	LUT	7.6 km	MPC · JPL
248530	2005 WQ_{147}	—	November 25, 2005	Catalina	CSS	·	4.2 km	MPC · JPL
248531	2005 WU_{148}	—	November 26, 2005	Mount Lemmon	Mount Lemmon Survey	·	5.4 km	MPC · JPL
248532	2005 WH_{152}	—	November 29, 2005	Kitt Peak	Spacewatch	·	4.7 km	MPC · JPL
248533	2005 WL_{180}	—	November 21, 2005	Catalina	CSS	·	4.8 km	MPC · JPL
248534	2005 WU_{180}	—	November 22, 2005	Catalina	CSS	LIX	4.6 km	MPC · JPL
248535	2005 WN_{184}	—	November 29, 2005	Anderson Mesa	LONEOS	·	5.3 km	MPC · JPL
248536	2005 WL_{185}	—	November 29, 2005	Socorro	LINEAR	·	2.1 km	MPC · JPL
248537	2005 WM_{185}	—	November 30, 2005	Socorro	LINEAR	EOS	5.7 km	MPC · JPL
248538	2005 WU_{185}	—	November 30, 2005	Socorro	LINEAR	·	2.0 km	MPC · JPL
248539	2005 WP_{190}	—	November 21, 2005	Palomar	NEAT	TIR	4.4 km	MPC · JPL
248540	2005 WY_{195}	—	November 26, 2005	Mount Lemmon	Mount Lemmon Survey	NEM	3.2 km	MPC · JPL
248541	2005 XW_{1}	—	December 1, 2005	Kitt Peak	Spacewatch	·	3.2 km	MPC · JPL
248542	2005 XK_{3}	—	December 1, 2005	Palomar	NEAT	LIX	5.3 km	MPC · JPL
248543	2005 XU_{5}	—	December 1, 2005	Kitt Peak	Spacewatch	·	3.1 km	MPC · JPL
248544	2005 XJ_{24}	—	December 2, 2005	Socorro	LINEAR	·	2.1 km	MPC · JPL
248545	2005 XR_{26}	—	December 4, 2005	Kitt Peak	Spacewatch	·	1.8 km	MPC · JPL
248546	2005 XC_{28}	—	December 1, 2005	Palomar	NEAT	HYG	3.0 km	MPC · JPL
248547	2005 XO_{41}	—	December 7, 2005	Socorro	LINEAR	·	4.7 km	MPC · JPL
248548	2005 XE_{54}	—	December 4, 2005	Catalina	CSS	T_{j} (2.97) · EUP	6.6 km	MPC · JPL
248549	2005 XY_{76}	—	December 8, 2005	Kitt Peak	Spacewatch	·	2.9 km	MPC · JPL
248550	2005 XS_{92}	—	December 10, 2005	Kitt Peak	Spacewatch	L5	14 km	MPC · JPL
248551	2005 XH_{115}	—	December 3, 2005	Mauna Kea	Mauna Kea	·	3.2 km	MPC · JPL
248552	2005 YA	—	December 17, 2005	Great Shefford	Birtwhistle, P.	T_{j} (2.99) · (895)	7.2 km	MPC · JPL
248553	2005 YN_{16}	—	December 22, 2005	Kitt Peak	Spacewatch	·	1.4 km	MPC · JPL
248554	2005 YW_{34}	—	December 24, 2005	Palomar	NEAT	·	4.7 km	MPC · JPL
248555	2005 YV_{37}	—	December 21, 2005	Catalina	CSS	·	6.1 km	MPC · JPL
248556	2005 YU_{95}	—	December 25, 2005	Kitt Peak	Spacewatch	·	3.3 km	MPC · JPL
248557	2005 YA_{107}	—	December 25, 2005	Mount Lemmon	Mount Lemmon Survey	·	3.3 km	MPC · JPL
248558	2005 YV_{125}	—	December 26, 2005	Kitt Peak	Spacewatch	·	3.5 km	MPC · JPL
248559	2005 YR_{147}	—	December 29, 2005	Mount Lemmon	Mount Lemmon Survey	·	2.3 km	MPC · JPL
248560	2005 YB_{175}	—	December 30, 2005	Socorro	LINEAR	·	5.5 km	MPC · JPL
248561	2005 YW_{204}	—	December 25, 2005	Mount Lemmon	Mount Lemmon Survey	·	4.5 km	MPC · JPL
248562	2005 YZ_{208}	—	December 22, 2005	Catalina	CSS	·	5.7 km	MPC · JPL
248563	2005 YE_{211}	—	December 25, 2005	Catalina	CSS	·	1.7 km	MPC · JPL
248564	2005 YD_{257}	—	December 30, 2005	Kitt Peak	Spacewatch	·	3.7 km	MPC · JPL
248565	2005 YH_{289}	—	December 30, 2005	Kitt Peak	Spacewatch	·	3.4 km	MPC · JPL
248566	2006 AF_{3}	—	January 2, 2006	Catalina	CSS	H	860 m	MPC · JPL
248567	2006 AL_{22}	—	January 5, 2006	Catalina	CSS	·	4.4 km	MPC · JPL
248568	2006 AH_{45}	—	January 2, 2006	Mount Lemmon	Mount Lemmon Survey	·	3.8 km	MPC · JPL
248569	2006 AU_{74}	—	January 8, 2006	Catalina	CSS	·	7.0 km	MPC · JPL
248570	2006 AY_{83}	—	January 5, 2006	Anderson Mesa	LONEOS	HYG	4.3 km	MPC · JPL
248571	2006 AL_{87}	—	January 4, 2006	Kitt Peak	Spacewatch	3:2	5.4 km	MPC · JPL
248572	2006 AA_{92}	—	January 7, 2006	Mount Lemmon	Mount Lemmon Survey	(260) · CYB	6.0 km	MPC · JPL
248573	2006 BY_{12}	—	January 21, 2006	Mount Lemmon	Mount Lemmon Survey	NYS	1.8 km	MPC · JPL
248574	2006 BC_{27}	—	January 20, 2006	Kitt Peak	Spacewatch	·	1.4 km	MPC · JPL
248575	2006 BC_{33}	—	January 21, 2006	Kitt Peak	Spacewatch	L5	13 km	MPC · JPL
248576	2006 BY_{58}	—	January 23, 2006	Kitt Peak	Spacewatch	·	4.2 km	MPC · JPL
248577	2006 BB_{63}	—	January 21, 2006	Palomar	NEAT	·	3.0 km	MPC · JPL
248578	2006 BT_{89}	—	January 25, 2006	Kitt Peak	Spacewatch	·	2.6 km	MPC · JPL
248579	2006 BS_{120}	—	January 26, 2006	Kitt Peak	Spacewatch	·	5.1 km	MPC · JPL
248580	2006 BF_{156}	—	January 25, 2006	Kitt Peak	Spacewatch	·	810 m	MPC · JPL
248581	2006 BU_{187}	—	January 28, 2006	Kitt Peak	Spacewatch	·	3.2 km	MPC · JPL
248582	2006 BO_{211}	—	January 31, 2006	Kitt Peak	Spacewatch	·	850 m	MPC · JPL
248583	2006 BX_{211}	—	January 31, 2006	Kitt Peak	Spacewatch	·	1.3 km	MPC · JPL
248584	2006 BR_{219}	—	January 28, 2006	Catalina	CSS	PHO	1.5 km	MPC · JPL
248585	2006 BN_{223}	—	January 30, 2006	Kitt Peak	Spacewatch	·	3.7 km	MPC · JPL
248586	2006 BU_{223}	—	January 30, 2006	Kitt Peak	Spacewatch	·	3.9 km	MPC · JPL
248587	2006 BQ_{249}	—	January 31, 2006	Mount Lemmon	Mount Lemmon Survey	·	840 m	MPC · JPL
248588	2006 BH_{251}	—	January 31, 2006	Kitt Peak	Spacewatch	MIS	2.6 km	MPC · JPL
248589	2006 BZ_{275}	—	January 26, 2006	Kitt Peak	Spacewatch	·	3.9 km	MPC · JPL
248590	2006 CS	—	February 1, 2006	Siding Spring	SSS	T_{j} (2.44) · APO +1km	4.7 km	MPC · JPL
248591	2006 CH_{40}	—	February 2, 2006	Mount Lemmon	Mount Lemmon Survey	·	920 m	MPC · JPL
248592	2006 CP_{41}	—	February 2, 2006	Kitt Peak	Spacewatch	·	2.4 km	MPC · JPL
248593	2006 CP_{66}	—	February 2, 2006	Mount Lemmon	Mount Lemmon Survey	·	920 m	MPC · JPL
248594	2006 DV_{10}	—	February 21, 2006	Anderson Mesa	LONEOS	ERI	2.3 km	MPC · JPL
248595	2006 DE_{14}	—	February 22, 2006	Catalina	CSS	·	1.0 km	MPC · JPL
248596	2006 DL_{14}	—	February 22, 2006	Socorro	LINEAR	·	1.2 km	MPC · JPL
248597	2006 DG_{22}	—	February 20, 2006	Kitt Peak	Spacewatch	HOF	3.4 km	MPC · JPL
248598	2006 DG_{28}	—	February 20, 2006	Kitt Peak	Spacewatch	·	1.0 km	MPC · JPL
248599	2006 DK_{31}	—	February 20, 2006	Mount Lemmon	Mount Lemmon Survey	·	2.4 km	MPC · JPL
248600	2006 DL_{31}	—	February 20, 2006	Mount Lemmon	Mount Lemmon Survey	·	980 m	MPC · JPL

== 248601–248700 ==
back to top

Designation			Discovery			Properties		Ref
Permanent	Provisional	Named after	Date	Site	Discoverer(s)	Category	Diam.	Ref
248601	2006 DH_{32}	—	February 20, 2006	Mount Lemmon	Mount Lemmon Survey	·	3.2 km	MPC · JPL
248602	2006 DN_{38}	—	February 21, 2006	Anderson Mesa	LONEOS	·	1.2 km	MPC · JPL
248603	2006 DB_{43}	—	February 20, 2006	Kitt Peak	Spacewatch	L5	9.0 km	MPC · JPL
248604	2006 DF_{49}	—	February 21, 2006	Catalina	CSS	·	2.1 km	MPC · JPL
248605	2006 DB_{55}	—	February 24, 2006	Kitt Peak	Spacewatch	HOF	2.8 km	MPC · JPL
248606	2006 DL_{67}	—	February 22, 2006	Catalina	CSS	·	1.2 km	MPC · JPL
248607	2006 DU_{73}	—	February 23, 2006	Kitt Peak	Spacewatch	·	2.5 km	MPC · JPL
248608	2006 DM_{95}	—	February 24, 2006	Kitt Peak	Spacewatch	EUN	2.1 km	MPC · JPL
248609	2006 DJ_{110}	—	February 25, 2006	Socorro	LINEAR	·	5.3 km	MPC · JPL
248610	2006 DJ_{120}	—	February 21, 2006	Anderson Mesa	LONEOS	·	990 m	MPC · JPL
248611	2006 DL_{131}	—	February 25, 2006	Kitt Peak	Spacewatch	NEM	2.6 km	MPC · JPL
248612	2006 DO_{135}	—	February 25, 2006	Mount Lemmon	Mount Lemmon Survey	·	790 m	MPC · JPL
248613	2006 DB_{136}	—	February 25, 2006	Mount Lemmon	Mount Lemmon Survey	·	2.1 km	MPC · JPL
248614	2006 DY_{141}	—	February 25, 2006	Kitt Peak	Spacewatch	(13314)	2.8 km	MPC · JPL
248615	2006 DB_{150}	—	February 25, 2006	Kitt Peak	Spacewatch	·	3.6 km	MPC · JPL
248616	2006 DC_{153}	—	February 25, 2006	Kitt Peak	Spacewatch	·	1.2 km	MPC · JPL
248617	2006 DC_{193}	—	February 27, 2006	Kitt Peak	Spacewatch	·	4.0 km	MPC · JPL
248618	2006 DM_{215}	—	February 28, 2006	Mount Lemmon	Mount Lemmon Survey	·	840 m	MPC · JPL
248619	2006 EA_{2}	—	March 3, 2006	Mount Nyukasa	Japan Aerospace Exploration Agency	·	930 m	MPC · JPL
248620	2006 ET_{17}	—	March 2, 2006	Kitt Peak	Spacewatch	·	740 m	MPC · JPL
248621	2006 EY_{19}	—	March 2, 2006	Kitt Peak	Spacewatch	AEO	2.0 km	MPC · JPL
248622	2006 EC_{40}	—	March 4, 2006	Kitt Peak	Spacewatch	·	2.8 km	MPC · JPL
248623	2006 EO_{44}	—	March 5, 2006	Kitt Peak	Spacewatch	·	1.0 km	MPC · JPL
248624	2006 EP_{56}	—	March 5, 2006	Kitt Peak	Spacewatch	·	910 m	MPC · JPL
248625	2006 FM	—	March 16, 2006	Palomar	NEAT	EUN	1.6 km	MPC · JPL
248626	2006 FL_{3}	—	March 23, 2006	Kitt Peak	Spacewatch	·	4.7 km	MPC · JPL
248627	2006 FR_{4}	—	March 23, 2006	Socorro	LINEAR	·	1.8 km	MPC · JPL
248628	2006 FJ_{11}	—	March 23, 2006	Kitt Peak	Spacewatch	·	1.6 km	MPC · JPL
248629	2006 FT_{16}	—	March 23, 2006	Mount Lemmon	Mount Lemmon Survey	PHO	1.0 km	MPC · JPL
248630	2006 FD_{21}	—	March 24, 2006	Kitt Peak	Spacewatch	·	1.3 km	MPC · JPL
248631	2006 FL_{24}	—	March 24, 2006	Kitt Peak	Spacewatch	NYS	1.8 km	MPC · JPL
248632	2006 FL_{28}	—	March 24, 2006	Mount Lemmon	Mount Lemmon Survey	HOF	3.5 km	MPC · JPL
248633	2006 FJ_{43}	—	March 29, 2006	Socorro	LINEAR	·	1.1 km	MPC · JPL
248634	2006 FU_{48}	—	March 24, 2006	Catalina	CSS	·	6.2 km	MPC · JPL
248635	2006 FJ_{52}	—	March 27, 2006	Siding Spring	SSS	PHO	1.4 km	MPC · JPL
248636	2006 FQ_{53}	—	March 25, 2006	Mount Lemmon	Mount Lemmon Survey	·	1.5 km	MPC · JPL
248637	2006 GD_{2}	—	April 2, 2006	Reedy Creek	J. Broughton	·	1.7 km	MPC · JPL
248638	2006 GO_{12}	—	April 2, 2006	Kitt Peak	Spacewatch	·	3.1 km	MPC · JPL
248639	2006 GE_{27}	—	April 2, 2006	Kitt Peak	Spacewatch	·	860 m	MPC · JPL
248640	2006 GH_{31}	—	April 2, 2006	Socorro	LINEAR	·	1.2 km	MPC · JPL
248641	2006 GF_{40}	—	April 6, 2006	Socorro	LINEAR	DOR	3.4 km	MPC · JPL
248642	2006 GG_{40}	—	April 6, 2006	Socorro	LINEAR	(2076)	1.8 km	MPC · JPL
248643	2006 GR_{40}	—	April 6, 2006	Catalina	CSS	PHO	1.6 km	MPC · JPL
248644	2006 HH_{2}	—	April 18, 2006	Catalina	CSS	·	1.2 km	MPC · JPL
248645	2006 HK_{4}	—	April 19, 2006	Mount Lemmon	Mount Lemmon Survey	AEO	2.1 km	MPC · JPL
248646	2006 HP_{7}	—	April 19, 2006	Catalina	CSS	·	2.0 km	MPC · JPL
248647	2006 HL_{19}	—	April 18, 2006	Kitt Peak	Spacewatch	·	2.3 km	MPC · JPL
248648	2006 HL_{38}	—	April 21, 2006	Kitt Peak	Spacewatch	KON	2.9 km	MPC · JPL
248649	2006 HW_{41}	—	April 21, 2006	Kitt Peak	Spacewatch	·	1.4 km	MPC · JPL
248650	2006 HC_{47}	—	April 20, 2006	Kitt Peak	Spacewatch	·	1.8 km	MPC · JPL
248651	2006 HN_{54}	—	April 20, 2006	Catalina	CSS	·	5.3 km	MPC · JPL
248652	2006 HQ_{56}	—	April 19, 2006	Catalina	CSS	·	2.0 km	MPC · JPL
248653	2006 HD_{57}	—	April 23, 2006	Socorro	LINEAR	·	1.6 km	MPC · JPL
248654	2006 HE_{64}	—	April 24, 2006	Kitt Peak	Spacewatch	·	1.9 km	MPC · JPL
248655	2006 HJ_{64}	—	April 24, 2006	Kitt Peak	Spacewatch	NYS	1.5 km	MPC · JPL
248656	2006 HW_{66}	—	April 24, 2006	Kitt Peak	Spacewatch	·	1.6 km	MPC · JPL
248657	2006 HC_{77}	—	April 25, 2006	Kitt Peak	Spacewatch	·	4.9 km	MPC · JPL
248658	2006 HK_{81}	—	April 26, 2006	Kitt Peak	Spacewatch	·	1.3 km	MPC · JPL
248659	2006 HJ_{84}	—	April 26, 2006	Kitt Peak	Spacewatch	·	4.0 km	MPC · JPL
248660	2006 HA_{87}	—	April 29, 2006	Catalina	CSS	·	1.3 km	MPC · JPL
248661	2006 HY_{94}	—	April 30, 2006	Kitt Peak	Spacewatch	·	3.0 km	MPC · JPL
248662	2006 HM_{117}	—	April 29, 2006	Kitt Peak	Spacewatch	·	1.1 km	MPC · JPL
248663	2006 HN_{151}	—	April 30, 2006	Anderson Mesa	LONEOS	NYS	1.4 km	MPC · JPL
248664	2006 HW_{151}	—	April 19, 2006	Mount Lemmon	Mount Lemmon Survey	NYS	1.2 km	MPC · JPL
248665	2006 JQ_{13}	—	May 3, 2006	Kitt Peak	Spacewatch	PAD	3.3 km	MPC · JPL
248666	2006 JB_{14}	—	May 4, 2006	Kitt Peak	Spacewatch	·	5.9 km	MPC · JPL
248667	2006 JX_{16}	—	May 2, 2006	Kitt Peak	Spacewatch	·	4.0 km	MPC · JPL
248668	2006 JY_{20}	—	May 2, 2006	Kitt Peak	Spacewatch	·	5.3 km	MPC · JPL
248669	2006 JQ_{25}	—	May 5, 2006	Mount Lemmon	Mount Lemmon Survey	V	830 m	MPC · JPL
248670	2006 JV_{25}	—	May 3, 2006	Mount Lemmon	Mount Lemmon Survey	L5	14 km	MPC · JPL
248671	2006 JN_{38}	—	May 6, 2006	Kitt Peak	Spacewatch	DOR	4.7 km	MPC · JPL
248672	2006 JX_{40}	—	May 7, 2006	Kitt Peak	Spacewatch	·	4.5 km	MPC · JPL
248673	2006 JT_{44}	—	May 6, 2006	Mount Lemmon	Mount Lemmon Survey	·	1.6 km	MPC · JPL
248674	2006 JK_{49}	—	May 1, 2006	Kitt Peak	Spacewatch	·	2.8 km	MPC · JPL
248675	2006 JS_{54}	—	May 8, 2006	Mount Lemmon	Mount Lemmon Survey	·	4.3 km	MPC · JPL
248676	2006 JF_{57}	—	May 14, 2006	Palomar	NEAT	·	3.5 km	MPC · JPL
248677	2006 JO_{80}	—	May 5, 2006	Kitt Peak	Spacewatch	·	1.1 km	MPC · JPL
248678	2006 KC_{9}	—	May 19, 2006	Mount Lemmon	Mount Lemmon Survey	NYS	1.4 km	MPC · JPL
248679	2006 KJ_{9}	—	May 19, 2006	Catalina	CSS	T_{j} (2.96)	7.7 km	MPC · JPL
248680	2006 KO_{11}	—	May 19, 2006	Palomar	NEAT	·	2.8 km	MPC · JPL
248681	2006 KH_{20}	—	May 20, 2006	Palomar	NEAT	·	4.3 km	MPC · JPL
248682	2006 KN_{39}	—	May 20, 2006	Siding Spring	SSS	MAS	960 m	MPC · JPL
248683	2006 KT_{41}	—	May 19, 2006	Palomar	NEAT	·	4.1 km	MPC · JPL
248684	2006 KU_{45}	—	May 21, 2006	Mount Lemmon	Mount Lemmon Survey	·	1.2 km	MPC · JPL
248685	2006 KG_{52}	—	May 21, 2006	Kitt Peak	Spacewatch	·	1.3 km	MPC · JPL
248686	2006 KW_{53}	—	May 21, 2006	Kitt Peak	Spacewatch	·	940 m	MPC · JPL
248687	2006 KJ_{57}	—	May 22, 2006	Kitt Peak	Spacewatch	·	1.0 km	MPC · JPL
248688	2006 KR_{61}	—	May 22, 2006	Kitt Peak	Spacewatch	·	3.3 km	MPC · JPL
248689	2006 KM_{71}	—	May 22, 2006	Kitt Peak	Spacewatch	V	820 m	MPC · JPL
248690	2006 KV_{74}	—	May 23, 2006	Kitt Peak	Spacewatch	·	2.4 km	MPC · JPL
248691	2006 KN_{78}	—	May 24, 2006	Mount Lemmon	Mount Lemmon Survey	·	2.2 km	MPC · JPL
248692	2006 KR_{80}	—	May 25, 2006	Mount Lemmon	Mount Lemmon Survey	·	6.7 km	MPC · JPL
248693	2006 KQ_{94}	—	May 25, 2006	Kitt Peak	Spacewatch	·	4.8 km	MPC · JPL
248694	2006 KH_{101}	—	May 25, 2006	Socorro	LINEAR	·	5.6 km	MPC · JPL
248695	2006 KO_{109}	—	May 31, 2006	Mount Lemmon	Mount Lemmon Survey	·	3.9 km	MPC · JPL
248696	2006 KZ_{115}	—	May 29, 2006	Kitt Peak	Spacewatch	NAE	3.4 km	MPC · JPL
248697	2006 KM_{118}	—	May 28, 2006	Kitt Peak	Spacewatch	·	960 m	MPC · JPL
248698	2006 KX_{120}	—	May 20, 2006	Catalina	CSS	·	4.7 km	MPC · JPL
248699	2006 KE_{121}	—	May 23, 2006	Siding Spring	SSS	·	3.9 km	MPC · JPL
248700	2006 MD_{7}	—	June 18, 2006	Kitt Peak	Spacewatch	·	1.8 km	MPC · JPL

== 248701–248800 ==
back to top

Designation			Discovery			Properties		Ref
Permanent	Provisional	Named after	Date	Site	Discoverer(s)	Category	Diam.	Ref
248701	2006 MK_{10}	—	June 17, 2006	Kitt Peak	Spacewatch	·	2.1 km	MPC · JPL
248702	2006 MF_{14}	—	June 17, 2006	Siding Spring	SSS	·	3.9 km	MPC · JPL
248703	2006 MK_{14}	—	June 18, 2006	Siding Spring	SSS	·	4.2 km	MPC · JPL
248704	2006 MS_{14}	—	June 30, 2006	Hibiscus	S. F. Hönig	·	1.8 km	MPC · JPL
248705	2006 MY_{14}	—	June 23, 2006	Anderson Mesa	LONEOS	·	1.2 km	MPC · JPL
248706	2006 NC	—	July 1, 2006	Pla D'Arguines	D'Arguines, Pla	·	1.4 km	MPC · JPL
248707	2006 OH_{3}	—	July 19, 2006	Lulin	LUSS	·	2.2 km	MPC · JPL
248708	2006 OK_{9}	—	July 23, 2006	Pla D'Arguines	R. Ferrando	NAE	3.9 km	MPC · JPL
248709	2006 OC_{10}	—	July 21, 2006	Catalina	CSS	·	2.4 km	MPC · JPL
248710	2006 OY_{12}	—	July 20, 2006	Palomar	NEAT	·	1.5 km	MPC · JPL
248711	2006 OC_{17}	—	July 21, 2006	Anderson Mesa	LONEOS	·	1.0 km	MPC · JPL
248712	2006 OS_{21}	—	July 28, 2006	Siding Spring	SSS	EUN	1.7 km	MPC · JPL
248713	2006 PS	—	August 6, 2006	Anderson Mesa	LONEOS	·	1.7 km	MPC · JPL
248714	2006 PC_{5}	—	August 12, 2006	Palomar	NEAT	·	1.8 km	MPC · JPL
248715	2006 PK_{16}	—	August 15, 2006	Palomar	NEAT	·	1.6 km	MPC · JPL
248716	2006 PC_{33}	—	August 13, 2006	Siding Spring	SSS	·	3.7 km	MPC · JPL
248717 Ódryárpád	2006 QQ_{4}	Ódryárpád	August 18, 2006	Piszkéstető	K. Sárneczky, Kuli, Z.	KON	2.6 km	MPC · JPL
248718	2006 QM_{9}	—	August 19, 2006	Kitt Peak	Spacewatch	·	6.6 km	MPC · JPL
248719	2006 QR_{9}	—	August 19, 2006	Kitt Peak	Spacewatch	·	2.7 km	MPC · JPL
248720	2006 QX_{14}	—	August 17, 2006	Palomar	NEAT	DOR	2.9 km	MPC · JPL
248721	2006 QK_{18}	—	August 17, 2006	Palomar	NEAT	·	5.1 km	MPC · JPL
248722	2006 QW_{18}	—	August 17, 2006	Palomar	NEAT	·	1.8 km	MPC · JPL
248723	2006 QN_{19}	—	August 17, 2006	Palomar	NEAT	(5)	1.2 km	MPC · JPL
248724	2006 QO_{21}	—	August 19, 2006	Anderson Mesa	LONEOS	·	1.5 km	MPC · JPL
248725	2006 QE_{22}	—	August 19, 2006	Anderson Mesa	LONEOS	·	1.2 km	MPC · JPL
248726	2006 QB_{23}	—	August 19, 2006	Anderson Mesa	LONEOS	·	2.5 km	MPC · JPL
248727	2006 QA_{29}	—	August 21, 2006	Kitt Peak	Spacewatch	·	2.8 km	MPC · JPL
248728	2006 QD_{48}	—	August 21, 2006	Kitt Peak	Spacewatch	·	2.8 km	MPC · JPL
248729	2006 QS_{50}	—	August 22, 2006	Palomar	NEAT	·	1.6 km	MPC · JPL
248730	2006 QG_{61}	—	August 21, 2006	Socorro	LINEAR	·	2.6 km	MPC · JPL
248731	2006 QV_{65}	—	August 27, 2006	Kitt Peak	Spacewatch	·	2.5 km	MPC · JPL
248732	2006 QK_{66}	—	August 21, 2006	Palomar	NEAT	·	3.6 km	MPC · JPL
248733	2006 QP_{111}	—	August 21, 2006	Socorro	LINEAR	·	1.9 km	MPC · JPL
248734	2006 QQ_{112}	—	August 23, 2006	Palomar	NEAT	·	4.2 km	MPC · JPL
248735	2006 QA_{118}	—	August 27, 2006	Anderson Mesa	LONEOS	·	5.8 km	MPC · JPL
248736	2006 QM_{118}	—	August 27, 2006	Anderson Mesa	LONEOS	·	2.0 km	MPC · JPL
248737	2006 QS_{118}	—	August 27, 2006	Anderson Mesa	LONEOS	·	1.6 km	MPC · JPL
248738	2006 QG_{131}	—	August 21, 2006	Palomar	NEAT	·	1.7 km	MPC · JPL
248739	2006 QA_{132}	—	August 22, 2006	Palomar	NEAT	·	2.8 km	MPC · JPL
248740	2006 QO_{136}	—	August 29, 2006	Anderson Mesa	LONEOS	·	1.7 km	MPC · JPL
248741	2006 QJ_{137}	—	August 30, 2006	Marly	Observatoire Naef	·	3.4 km	MPC · JPL
248742	2006 QP_{139}	—	August 17, 2006	Palomar	NEAT	·	4.8 km	MPC · JPL
248743	2006 QJ_{155}	—	August 18, 2006	Palomar	NEAT	(194)	2.5 km	MPC · JPL
248744	2006 QE_{163}	—	August 29, 2006	Catalina	CSS	·	3.0 km	MPC · JPL
248745	2006 QJ_{166}	—	August 29, 2006	Catalina	CSS	·	6.5 km	MPC · JPL
248746	2006 QG_{167}	—	August 30, 2006	Anderson Mesa	LONEOS	·	4.3 km	MPC · JPL
248747	2006 QY_{168}	—	August 30, 2006	Anderson Mesa	LONEOS	·	2.4 km	MPC · JPL
248748	2006 RN	—	September 1, 2006	Vicques	M. Ory	·	5.2 km	MPC · JPL
248749	2006 RU	—	September 2, 2006	Costitx	OAM	·	3.0 km	MPC · JPL
248750 Asteroidday	2006 RH_{1}	Asteroidday	September 4, 2006	Roeser	Dawson, M.	·	4.8 km	MPC · JPL
248751	2006 RM_{6}	—	September 14, 2006	Catalina	CSS	·	1.8 km	MPC · JPL
248752	2006 RM_{14}	—	September 14, 2006	Kitt Peak	Spacewatch	URS	5.3 km	MPC · JPL
248753	2006 RA_{18}	—	September 14, 2006	Palomar	NEAT	·	2.4 km	MPC · JPL
248754	2006 RC_{19}	—	September 14, 2006	Catalina	CSS	·	3.7 km	MPC · JPL
248755	2006 RW_{23}	—	September 13, 2006	Palomar	NEAT	·	1.4 km	MPC · JPL
248756	2006 RD_{31}	—	September 15, 2006	Socorro	LINEAR	·	2.8 km	MPC · JPL
248757	2006 RK_{32}	—	September 15, 2006	Kitt Peak	Spacewatch	·	3.1 km	MPC · JPL
248758	2006 RF_{37}	—	September 12, 2006	Catalina	CSS	·	3.1 km	MPC · JPL
248759	2006 RW_{47}	—	September 14, 2006	Palomar	NEAT	ADE	2.4 km	MPC · JPL
248760	2006 RA_{58}	—	September 15, 2006	Socorro	LINEAR	·	3.0 km	MPC · JPL
248761	2006 RB_{58}	—	September 15, 2006	Kitt Peak	Spacewatch	·	1.5 km	MPC · JPL
248762	2006 RG_{62}	—	September 12, 2006	Catalina	CSS	·	2.6 km	MPC · JPL
248763	2006 RR_{65}	—	September 14, 2006	Catalina	CSS	·	1.5 km	MPC · JPL
248764	2006 RO_{69}	—	September 15, 2006	Kitt Peak	Spacewatch	·	4.2 km	MPC · JPL
248765	2006 RT_{69}	—	September 15, 2006	Kitt Peak	Spacewatch	·	2.8 km	MPC · JPL
248766	2006 RV_{70}	—	September 15, 2006	Kitt Peak	Spacewatch	·	2.6 km	MPC · JPL
248767	2006 RC_{82}	—	September 15, 2006	Kitt Peak	Spacewatch	·	1.9 km	MPC · JPL
248768	2006 RA_{92}	—	September 15, 2006	Kitt Peak	Spacewatch	NEM	2.7 km	MPC · JPL
248769	2006 RU_{93}	—	September 15, 2006	Kitt Peak	Spacewatch	·	5.3 km	MPC · JPL
248770	2006 RA_{98}	—	September 13, 2006	Palomar	NEAT	·	1.9 km	MPC · JPL
248771	2006 RU_{122}	—	September 6, 2006	Palomar	NEAT	·	3.4 km	MPC · JPL
248772	2006 SH_{5}	—	September 16, 2006	Palomar	NEAT	·	3.3 km	MPC · JPL
248773	2006 SV_{8}	—	September 17, 2006	Catalina	CSS	·	6.2 km	MPC · JPL
248774	2006 ST_{12}	—	September 16, 2006	Palomar	NEAT	·	2.8 km	MPC · JPL
248775	2006 SH_{14}	—	September 17, 2006	Catalina	CSS	·	1.9 km	MPC · JPL
248776	2006 SW_{16}	—	September 17, 2006	Catalina	CSS	·	2.5 km	MPC · JPL
248777	2006 SJ_{18}	—	September 17, 2006	Kitt Peak	Spacewatch	(5)	1.7 km	MPC · JPL
248778	2006 SE_{19}	—	September 17, 2006	Kitt Peak	Spacewatch	·	2.2 km	MPC · JPL
248779	2006 SV_{26}	—	September 16, 2006	Anderson Mesa	LONEOS	·	3.3 km	MPC · JPL
248780	2006 SH_{34}	—	September 17, 2006	Catalina	CSS	·	2.7 km	MPC · JPL
248781	2006 SP_{35}	—	September 17, 2006	Kitt Peak	Spacewatch	·	5.5 km	MPC · JPL
248782	2006 SX_{37}	—	September 18, 2006	Kitt Peak	Spacewatch	WIT	1.3 km	MPC · JPL
248783	2006 SY_{42}	—	September 18, 2006	Catalina	CSS	(1547)	1.6 km	MPC · JPL
248784	2006 SF_{46}	—	September 18, 2006	Catalina	CSS	·	2.6 km	MPC · JPL
248785	2006 SG_{49}	—	September 19, 2006	Kitt Peak	Spacewatch	·	2.0 km	MPC · JPL
248786	2006 SA_{54}	—	September 16, 2006	Catalina	CSS	·	3.4 km	MPC · JPL
248787	2006 SD_{57}	—	September 18, 2006	Calvin-Rehoboth	Calvin College	GEF	1.4 km	MPC · JPL
248788	2006 SM_{59}	—	September 16, 2006	Anderson Mesa	LONEOS	·	2.3 km	MPC · JPL
248789	2006 SR_{59}	—	September 17, 2006	Catalina	CSS	·	2.2 km	MPC · JPL
248790	2006 SR_{61}	—	September 16, 2006	Catalina	CSS	·	1.9 km	MPC · JPL
248791	2006 SR_{77}	—	September 24, 2006	Calvin-Rehoboth	L. A. Molnar	·	3.2 km	MPC · JPL
248792	2006 SS_{78}	—	September 16, 2006	Catalina	CSS	·	4.4 km	MPC · JPL
248793	2006 SD_{85}	—	September 18, 2006	Kitt Peak	Spacewatch	·	3.5 km	MPC · JPL
248794	2006 SV_{92}	—	September 18, 2006	Kitt Peak	Spacewatch	·	2.6 km	MPC · JPL
248795	2006 SC_{94}	—	September 18, 2006	Kitt Peak	Spacewatch	·	2.6 km	MPC · JPL
248796	2006 SC_{104}	—	September 19, 2006	Catalina	CSS	URS	4.9 km	MPC · JPL
248797	2006 SS_{113}	—	September 23, 2006	Kitt Peak	Spacewatch	(13314)	2.4 km	MPC · JPL
248798	2006 SR_{114}	—	September 23, 2006	Kitt Peak	Spacewatch	AST	2.7 km	MPC · JPL
248799	2006 SW_{115}	—	September 24, 2006	Anderson Mesa	LONEOS	SYL · CYB	7.3 km	MPC · JPL
248800	2006 SK_{119}	—	September 18, 2006	Catalina	CSS	·	1.5 km	MPC · JPL

== 248801–248900 ==
back to top

Designation			Discovery			Properties		Ref
Permanent	Provisional	Named after	Date	Site	Discoverer(s)	Category	Diam.	Ref
248801	2006 SJ_{122}	—	September 19, 2006	Catalina	CSS	·	6.0 km	MPC · JPL
248802	2006 SQ_{126}	—	September 21, 2006	Anderson Mesa	LONEOS	·	1.7 km	MPC · JPL
248803	2006 SB_{130}	—	September 19, 2006	Anderson Mesa	LONEOS	NEM	2.5 km	MPC · JPL
248804	2006 SK_{132}	—	September 16, 2006	Catalina	CSS	·	2.7 km	MPC · JPL
248805	2006 SZ_{132}	—	September 16, 2006	Catalina	CSS	GEF	1.8 km	MPC · JPL
248806	2006 SD_{145}	—	September 19, 2006	Kitt Peak	Spacewatch	AST	3.1 km	MPC · JPL
248807	2006 SC_{148}	—	September 19, 2006	Kitt Peak	Spacewatch	·	3.1 km	MPC · JPL
248808	2006 SV_{155}	—	September 23, 2006	Kitt Peak	Spacewatch	·	2.1 km	MPC · JPL
248809	2006 SX_{162}	—	September 24, 2006	Kitt Peak	Spacewatch	EOS	5.5 km	MPC · JPL
248810	2006 SC_{163}	—	September 24, 2006	Kitt Peak	Spacewatch	·	4.9 km	MPC · JPL
248811	2006 SJ_{167}	—	September 25, 2006	Kitt Peak	Spacewatch	·	3.7 km	MPC · JPL
248812	2006 SU_{167}	—	September 25, 2006	Kitt Peak	Spacewatch	·	3.8 km	MPC · JPL
248813	2006 SC_{175}	—	September 25, 2006	Kitt Peak	Spacewatch	·	2.7 km	MPC · JPL
248814	2006 SD_{197}	—	September 16, 2006	Catalina	CSS	·	4.4 km	MPC · JPL
248815	2006 ST_{198}	—	September 22, 2006	Catalina	CSS	·	2.1 km	MPC · JPL
248816	2006 SZ_{212}	—	September 26, 2006	Catalina	CSS	ADE	2.7 km	MPC · JPL
248817	2006 SQ_{213}	—	September 27, 2006	Kitt Peak	Spacewatch	·	2.2 km	MPC · JPL
248818	2006 SZ_{217}	—	September 30, 2006	Kitt Peak	Spacewatch	AMO +1km	1.2 km	MPC · JPL
248819	2006 SB_{253}	—	September 26, 2006	Kitt Peak	Spacewatch	·	2.4 km	MPC · JPL
248820	2006 SS_{265}	—	September 26, 2006	Catalina	CSS	·	4.8 km	MPC · JPL
248821	2006 SJ_{269}	—	September 26, 2006	Kitt Peak	Spacewatch	·	3.9 km	MPC · JPL
248822	2006 SO_{270}	—	September 27, 2006	Kitt Peak	Spacewatch	ERI	2.4 km	MPC · JPL
248823	2006 SX_{277}	—	September 28, 2006	Socorro	LINEAR	·	2.1 km	MPC · JPL
248824	2006 SA_{281}	—	September 29, 2006	Anderson Mesa	LONEOS	·	2.7 km	MPC · JPL
248825	2006 SE_{284}	—	September 26, 2006	Catalina	CSS	·	2.7 km	MPC · JPL
248826	2006 SX_{302}	—	September 27, 2006	Kitt Peak	Spacewatch	PAD	2.6 km	MPC · JPL
248827	2006 SE_{315}	—	September 27, 2006	Kitt Peak	Spacewatch	·	5.1 km	MPC · JPL
248828	2006 SG_{343}	—	September 28, 2006	Kitt Peak	Spacewatch	·	4.6 km	MPC · JPL
248829	2006 SJ_{357}	—	September 30, 2006	Catalina	CSS	·	1.9 km	MPC · JPL
248830	2006 ST_{359}	—	September 30, 2006	Catalina	CSS	·	2.4 km	MPC · JPL
248831	2006 SC_{365}	—	September 30, 2006	Catalina	CSS	·	1.2 km	MPC · JPL
248832	2006 SK_{365}	—	September 30, 2006	Catalina	CSS	HYG	3.8 km	MPC · JPL
248833	2006 SK_{366}	—	September 30, 2006	Mount Lemmon	Mount Lemmon Survey	(5)	2.3 km	MPC · JPL
248834	2006 SG_{367}	—	September 25, 2006	Catalina	CSS	EUN	1.6 km	MPC · JPL
248835	2006 SX_{368}	—	September 16, 2006	Apache Point	A. C. Becker, Puckett, A. W., Kubica, J.	centaur	78 km	MPC · JPL
248836	2006 SF_{387}	—	September 30, 2006	Apache Point	A. C. Becker	·	3.6 km	MPC · JPL
248837	2006 SH_{393}	—	September 28, 2006	Mount Lemmon	Mount Lemmon Survey	·	2.8 km	MPC · JPL
248838	2006 SW_{402}	—	September 26, 2006	Mount Lemmon	Mount Lemmon Survey	LIX	6.6 km	MPC · JPL
248839 Mažeikiai	2006 SY_{406}	Mažeikiai	September 25, 2006	Moletai	K. Černis	EUN	1.8 km	MPC · JPL
248840	2006 TE	—	October 1, 2006	Hibiscus	S. F. Hönig	·	3.0 km	MPC · JPL
248841	2006 TG_{4}	—	October 2, 2006	Mount Lemmon	Mount Lemmon Survey	·	2.2 km	MPC · JPL
248842	2006 TJ_{11}	—	October 15, 2006	Piszkéstető	K. Sárneczky, Kuli, Z.	·	6.0 km	MPC · JPL
248843	2006 TU_{12}	—	October 10, 2006	Palomar	NEAT	BRG	1.6 km	MPC · JPL
248844	2006 TY_{20}	—	October 11, 2006	Kitt Peak	Spacewatch	MIS	2.7 km	MPC · JPL
248845	2006 TJ_{26}	—	October 12, 2006	Kitt Peak	Spacewatch	·	4.3 km	MPC · JPL
248846	2006 TQ_{30}	—	October 12, 2006	Kitt Peak	Spacewatch	HOF	2.9 km	MPC · JPL
248847	2006 TC_{51}	—	October 12, 2006	Kitt Peak	Spacewatch	(5)	2.5 km	MPC · JPL
248848	2006 TK_{55}	—	October 12, 2006	Palomar	NEAT	·	2.1 km	MPC · JPL
248849	2006 TA_{61}	—	October 15, 2006	Kitt Peak	Spacewatch	·	1.9 km	MPC · JPL
248850	2006 TA_{62}	—	October 9, 2006	Palomar	NEAT	·	2.1 km	MPC · JPL
248851	2006 TV_{68}	—	October 11, 2006	Palomar	NEAT	·	2.1 km	MPC · JPL
248852	2006 TC_{69}	—	October 11, 2006	Palomar	NEAT	·	2.2 km	MPC · JPL
248853	2006 TO_{72}	—	October 11, 2006	Palomar	NEAT	·	5.4 km	MPC · JPL
248854	2006 TV_{75}	—	October 11, 2006	Palomar	NEAT	·	2.7 km	MPC · JPL
248855	2006 TW_{76}	—	October 11, 2006	Palomar	NEAT	DOR	3.6 km	MPC · JPL
248856	2006 TL_{85}	—	October 13, 2006	Kitt Peak	Spacewatch	HOF	2.6 km	MPC · JPL
248857	2006 TF_{98}	—	October 15, 2006	Kitt Peak	Spacewatch	·	2.9 km	MPC · JPL
248858	2006 TE_{101}	—	October 15, 2006	Kitt Peak	Spacewatch	EMA	5.5 km	MPC · JPL
248859	2006 TK_{105}	—	October 15, 2006	Kitt Peak	Spacewatch	HOF	2.9 km	MPC · JPL
248860	2006 UM_{5}	—	October 16, 2006	Goodricke-Pigott	R. A. Tucker	·	2.3 km	MPC · JPL
248861	2006 UO_{7}	—	October 16, 2006	Catalina	CSS	·	1 km	MPC · JPL
248862	2006 UN_{8}	—	October 16, 2006	Catalina	CSS	·	5.6 km	MPC · JPL
248863	2006 UW_{10}	—	October 17, 2006	Mount Lemmon	Mount Lemmon Survey	EUP	6.4 km	MPC · JPL
248864	2006 UD_{12}	—	October 17, 2006	Mount Lemmon	Mount Lemmon Survey	·	2.1 km	MPC · JPL
248865	2006 UL_{53}	—	October 17, 2006	Kitt Peak	Spacewatch	·	4.8 km	MPC · JPL
248866 Margherita	2006 UN_{55}	Margherita	October 17, 2006	San Marcello	L. Tesi, M. T. Mazzucato	·	1.4 km	MPC · JPL
248867	2006 UP_{56}	—	October 18, 2006	Kitt Peak	Spacewatch	·	2.4 km	MPC · JPL
248868	2006 UA_{58}	—	October 18, 2006	Kitt Peak	Spacewatch	VER	4.2 km	MPC · JPL
248869	2006 UH_{67}	—	October 16, 2006	Catalina	CSS	·	2.2 km	MPC · JPL
248870	2006 UR_{71}	—	October 17, 2006	Kitt Peak	Spacewatch	·	5.1 km	MPC · JPL
248871	2006 UT_{84}	—	October 17, 2006	Kitt Peak	Spacewatch	AGN	1.5 km	MPC · JPL
248872	2006 UA_{101}	—	October 18, 2006	Kitt Peak	Spacewatch	KON	3.3 km	MPC · JPL
248873	2006 UA_{104}	—	October 18, 2006	Kitt Peak	Spacewatch	·	2.7 km	MPC · JPL
248874	2006 UZ_{114}	—	October 19, 2006	Kitt Peak	Spacewatch	·	2.2 km	MPC · JPL
248875	2006 UA_{127}	—	October 19, 2006	Kitt Peak	Spacewatch	·	2.5 km	MPC · JPL
248876	2006 UH_{133}	—	October 19, 2006	Kitt Peak	Spacewatch	·	3.1 km	MPC · JPL
248877	2006 UG_{144}	—	October 19, 2006	Catalina	CSS	EOS	3.4 km	MPC · JPL
248878	2006 UZ_{149}	—	October 20, 2006	Catalina	CSS	·	2.3 km	MPC · JPL
248879	2006 UK_{153}	—	October 21, 2006	Kitt Peak	Spacewatch	·	2.8 km	MPC · JPL
248880	2006 UB_{175}	—	October 16, 2006	Catalina	CSS	·	5.0 km	MPC · JPL
248881	2006 UO_{181}	—	October 16, 2006	Catalina	CSS	·	6.4 km	MPC · JPL
248882	2006 UE_{184}	—	October 19, 2006	Catalina	CSS	·	1.9 km	MPC · JPL
248883	2006 UA_{187}	—	October 19, 2006	Catalina	CSS	·	2.2 km	MPC · JPL
248884	2006 UJ_{189}	—	October 19, 2006	Catalina	CSS	ADE	2.1 km	MPC · JPL
248885	2006 UQ_{190}	—	October 19, 2006	Catalina	CSS	·	2.8 km	MPC · JPL
248886	2006 UC_{200}	—	October 21, 2006	Catalina	CSS	ADE	2.6 km	MPC · JPL
248887	2006 UD_{204}	—	October 22, 2006	Palomar	NEAT	·	3.1 km	MPC · JPL
248888	2006 UU_{219}	—	October 16, 2006	Mount Lemmon	Mount Lemmon Survey	·	1.7 km	MPC · JPL
248889	2006 UD_{220}	—	October 16, 2006	Catalina	CSS	·	2.0 km	MPC · JPL
248890	2006 UL_{222}	—	October 17, 2006	Catalina	CSS	·	2.4 km	MPC · JPL
248891	2006 UB_{229}	—	October 20, 2006	Palomar	NEAT	·	1.6 km	MPC · JPL
248892	2006 UJ_{229}	—	October 20, 2006	Palomar	NEAT	·	1.7 km	MPC · JPL
248893	2006 UQ_{240}	—	October 23, 2006	Catalina	CSS	EUN	2.2 km	MPC · JPL
248894	2006 UJ_{266}	—	October 27, 2006	Kitt Peak	Spacewatch	·	4.7 km	MPC · JPL
248895	2006 UF_{268}	—	October 27, 2006	Catalina	CSS	·	2.5 km	MPC · JPL
248896	2006 UE_{270}	—	October 27, 2006	Mount Lemmon	Mount Lemmon Survey	·	3.5 km	MPC · JPL
248897	2006 UV_{272}	—	October 27, 2006	Kitt Peak	Spacewatch	·	3.3 km	MPC · JPL
248898	2006 UB_{275}	—	October 28, 2006	Kitt Peak	Spacewatch	·	2.1 km	MPC · JPL
248899	2006 UZ_{284}	—	October 28, 2006	Mount Lemmon	Mount Lemmon Survey	·	6.9 km	MPC · JPL
248900	2006 UJ_{328}	—	October 17, 2006	Catalina	CSS	·	2.2 km	MPC · JPL

== 248901–249000 ==
back to top

Designation			Discovery			Properties		Ref
Permanent	Provisional	Named after	Date	Site	Discoverer(s)	Category	Diam.	Ref
248901	2006 UQ_{337}	—	October 16, 2006	Kitt Peak	Spacewatch	·	3.5 km	MPC · JPL
248902	2006 UC_{347}	—	October 20, 2006	Catalina	CSS	·	4.5 km	MPC · JPL
248903	2006 UF_{358}	—	October 22, 2006	Mount Lemmon	Mount Lemmon Survey	·	3.2 km	MPC · JPL
248904	2006 VE	—	November 1, 2006	Wrightwood	J. W. Young	·	1.8 km	MPC · JPL
248905	2006 VM_{6}	—	November 10, 2006	Kitt Peak	Spacewatch	·	5.6 km	MPC · JPL
248906	2006 VX_{14}	—	November 9, 2006	Kitt Peak	Spacewatch	·	2.9 km	MPC · JPL
248907	2006 VU_{39}	—	November 12, 2006	Mount Lemmon	Mount Lemmon Survey	·	5.0 km	MPC · JPL
248908 Ginostrada	2006 VY_{45}	Ginostrada	November 15, 2006	Vallemare Borbona	V. S. Casulli	·	3.9 km	MPC · JPL
248909	2006 VR_{52}	—	November 11, 2006	Kitt Peak	Spacewatch	(16286)	3.0 km	MPC · JPL
248910	2006 VW_{64}	—	November 11, 2006	Kitt Peak	Spacewatch	·	4.1 km	MPC · JPL
248911	2006 VQ_{66}	—	November 11, 2006	Catalina	CSS	·	4.6 km	MPC · JPL
248912	2006 VY_{68}	—	November 11, 2006	Kitt Peak	Spacewatch	DOR	4.0 km	MPC · JPL
248913	2006 VQ_{80}	—	November 12, 2006	Mount Lemmon	Mount Lemmon Survey	·	2.5 km	MPC · JPL
248914	2006 VM_{84}	—	November 13, 2006	Kitt Peak	Spacewatch	·	2.6 km	MPC · JPL
248915	2006 VS_{89}	—	November 14, 2006	Kitt Peak	Spacewatch	·	3.1 km	MPC · JPL
248916	2006 VF_{90}	—	November 14, 2006	Catalina	CSS	(5)	1.8 km	MPC · JPL
248917	2006 VE_{110}	—	November 13, 2006	Kitt Peak	Spacewatch	·	4.2 km	MPC · JPL
248918	2006 VU_{123}	—	November 14, 2006	Socorro	LINEAR	·	1.8 km	MPC · JPL
248919	2006 VO_{128}	—	November 15, 2006	Kitt Peak	Spacewatch	·	3.6 km	MPC · JPL
248920	2006 VS_{133}	—	November 15, 2006	Socorro	LINEAR	·	2.3 km	MPC · JPL
248921	2006 VS_{143}	—	November 15, 2006	Catalina	CSS	·	2.3 km	MPC · JPL
248922	2006 VT_{145}	—	November 15, 2006	Catalina	CSS	·	3.2 km	MPC · JPL
248923	2006 VB_{148}	—	November 15, 2006	Catalina	CSS	·	3.6 km	MPC · JPL
248924	2006 VR_{152}	—	November 9, 2006	Palomar	NEAT	ADE	3.4 km	MPC · JPL
248925	2006 VN_{156}	—	November 13, 2006	Apache Point	SDSS	HOF	3.2 km	MPC · JPL
248926	2006 WZ_{2}	—	November 17, 2006	Catalina	CSS	AMO +1km	2.9 km	MPC · JPL
248927	2006 WD_{5}	—	November 16, 2006	Kitt Peak	Spacewatch	KOR	2.0 km	MPC · JPL
248928	2006 WY_{7}	—	November 16, 2006	Socorro	LINEAR	·	3.3 km	MPC · JPL
248929	2006 WZ_{11}	—	November 16, 2006	Mount Lemmon	Mount Lemmon Survey	·	6.0 km	MPC · JPL
248930	2006 WL_{22}	—	November 17, 2006	Mount Lemmon	Mount Lemmon Survey	·	1.9 km	MPC · JPL
248931	2006 WY_{26}	—	November 18, 2006	Socorro	LINEAR	EOS	3.4 km	MPC · JPL
248932	2006 WE_{27}	—	November 18, 2006	Kitt Peak	Spacewatch	·	4.4 km	MPC · JPL
248933	2006 WA_{33}	—	November 16, 2006	Catalina	CSS	·	2.9 km	MPC · JPL
248934	2006 WK_{52}	—	November 16, 2006	Kitt Peak	Spacewatch	KOR	1.7 km	MPC · JPL
248935	2006 WH_{55}	—	November 16, 2006	Kitt Peak	Spacewatch	·	2.7 km	MPC · JPL
248936	2006 WH_{57}	—	November 17, 2006	Kitt Peak	Spacewatch	·	4.4 km	MPC · JPL
248937	2006 WY_{68}	—	November 17, 2006	Mount Lemmon	Mount Lemmon Survey	EOS	2.9 km	MPC · JPL
248938	2006 WT_{81}	—	November 18, 2006	Kitt Peak	Spacewatch	·	3.4 km	MPC · JPL
248939	2006 WX_{107}	—	November 19, 2006	Socorro	LINEAR	·	5.6 km	MPC · JPL
248940	2006 WB_{109}	—	November 19, 2006	Kitt Peak	Spacewatch	·	5.2 km	MPC · JPL
248941	2006 WP_{115}	—	November 20, 2006	Catalina	CSS	·	3.0 km	MPC · JPL
248942	2006 WA_{125}	—	November 22, 2006	Catalina	CSS	MRX	1.3 km	MPC · JPL
248943	2006 WU_{130}	—	November 18, 2006	Catalina	CSS	TIN	3.6 km	MPC · JPL
248944	2006 WN_{137}	—	November 19, 2006	Kitt Peak	Spacewatch	·	2.3 km	MPC · JPL
248945	2006 WH_{146}	—	November 20, 2006	Kitt Peak	Spacewatch	HIL · 3:2	7.7 km	MPC · JPL
248946	2006 WH_{148}	—	November 20, 2006	Socorro	LINEAR	T_{j} (2.98) · EUP	7.1 km	MPC · JPL
248947	2006 WR_{152}	—	November 21, 2006	Mount Lemmon	Mount Lemmon Survey	·	4.9 km	MPC · JPL
248948	2006 WG_{170}	—	November 23, 2006	Kitt Peak	Spacewatch	·	5.3 km	MPC · JPL
248949	2006 WD_{184}	—	November 25, 2006	Kitt Peak	Spacewatch	EOS ·	4.7 km	MPC · JPL
248950	2006 WP_{188}	—	November 24, 2006	Mount Lemmon	Mount Lemmon Survey	·	2.8 km	MPC · JPL
248951	2006 XA_{4}	—	December 13, 2006	Vicques	M. Ory	·	1.8 km	MPC · JPL
248952	2006 XB_{5}	—	December 1, 2006	Catalina	CSS	·	2.2 km	MPC · JPL
248953	2006 XX_{11}	—	December 10, 2006	Kitt Peak	Spacewatch	·	3.9 km	MPC · JPL
248954	2006 XB_{17}	—	December 10, 2006	Kitt Peak	Spacewatch	·	3.4 km	MPC · JPL
248955	2006 XC_{21}	—	December 11, 2006	Kitt Peak	Spacewatch	·	5.5 km	MPC · JPL
248956	2006 XF_{29}	—	December 13, 2006	Mount Lemmon	Mount Lemmon Survey	·	4.4 km	MPC · JPL
248957	2006 XE_{52}	—	December 14, 2006	Socorro	LINEAR	EOS	3.7 km	MPC · JPL
248958	2006 XJ_{54}	—	December 15, 2006	Socorro	LINEAR	·	7.1 km	MPC · JPL
248959	2006 XL_{66}	—	December 13, 2006	Socorro	LINEAR	·	1.5 km	MPC · JPL
248960	2006 YT_{1}	—	December 17, 2006	Mount Lemmon	Mount Lemmon Survey	·	4.1 km	MPC · JPL
248961	2006 YW_{3}	—	December 16, 2006	Mount Lemmon	Mount Lemmon Survey	HYG	4.8 km	MPC · JPL
248962	2006 YG_{6}	—	December 17, 2006	Mount Lemmon	Mount Lemmon Survey	·	3.3 km	MPC · JPL
248963	2006 YK_{15}	—	December 20, 2006	Palomar	NEAT	·	3.1 km	MPC · JPL
248964	2006 YA_{16}	—	December 21, 2006	Palomar	NEAT	·	5.6 km	MPC · JPL
248965	2006 YD_{16}	—	December 21, 2006	Kitt Peak	Spacewatch	·	3.5 km	MPC · JPL
248966	2006 YX_{45}	—	December 21, 2006	Catalina	CSS	·	5.8 km	MPC · JPL
248967	2007 AF	—	January 7, 2007	Eskridge	G. Hug	·	6.1 km	MPC · JPL
248968	2007 BP_{30}	—	January 24, 2007	Catalina	CSS	·	4.7 km	MPC · JPL
248969	2007 BJ_{36}	—	January 24, 2007	Socorro	LINEAR	·	1.4 km	MPC · JPL
248970 Giannimorandi	2007 BC_{49}	Giannimorandi	January 19, 2007	Vallemare Borbona	V. S. Casulli	·	5.5 km	MPC · JPL
248971	2007 BD_{54}	—	January 24, 2007	Kitt Peak	Spacewatch	·	5.3 km	MPC · JPL
248972	2007 CO_{4}	—	February 6, 2007	Mount Lemmon	Mount Lemmon Survey	·	3.3 km	MPC · JPL
248973	2007 CS_{4}	—	February 6, 2007	Mount Lemmon	Mount Lemmon Survey	·	4.1 km	MPC · JPL
248974	2007 DU_{7}	—	February 18, 2007	Calvin-Rehoboth	Calvin College	·	4.0 km	MPC · JPL
248975	2007 DS_{38}	—	February 17, 2007	Kitt Peak	Spacewatch	·	3.9 km	MPC · JPL
248976	2007 DM_{97}	—	February 23, 2007	Kitt Peak	Spacewatch	L5	10 km	MPC · JPL
248977	2007 DL_{109}	—	February 16, 2007	Catalina	CSS	H	800 m	MPC · JPL
248978	2007 DH_{111}	—	February 23, 2007	Kitt Peak	Spacewatch	L5	10 km	MPC · JPL
248979	2007 DY_{113}	—	February 23, 2007	Kitt Peak	Spacewatch	L5	10 km	MPC · JPL
248980	2007 DW_{115}	—	February 23, 2007	Mount Lemmon	Mount Lemmon Survey	EOS	3.3 km	MPC · JPL
248981	2007 EB_{14}	—	March 9, 2007	Kitt Peak	Spacewatch	·	4.8 km	MPC · JPL
248982	2007 EO_{22}	—	March 10, 2007	Mount Lemmon	Mount Lemmon Survey	·	2.0 km	MPC · JPL
248983	2007 EE_{44}	—	March 9, 2007	Kitt Peak	Spacewatch	·	4.3 km	MPC · JPL
248984	2007 EP_{73}	—	March 10, 2007	Mount Lemmon	Mount Lemmon Survey	·	4.4 km	MPC · JPL
248985	2007 EU_{147}	—	March 12, 2007	Mount Lemmon	Mount Lemmon Survey	L5	10 km	MPC · JPL
248986	2007 EX_{147}	—	March 12, 2007	Mount Lemmon	Mount Lemmon Survey	L5	17 km	MPC · JPL
248987	2007 EM_{180}	—	March 14, 2007	Mount Lemmon	Mount Lemmon Survey	·	1.9 km	MPC · JPL
248988	2007 EU_{201}	—	March 9, 2007	Mount Lemmon	Mount Lemmon Survey	·	3.1 km	MPC · JPL
248989	2007 EM_{212}	—	March 8, 2007	Palomar	NEAT	·	6.3 km	MPC · JPL
248990	2007 FX_{3}	—	March 18, 2007	Mount Nyukasa	Japan Aerospace Exploration Agency	L5	16 km	MPC · JPL
248991	2007 FL_{22}	—	March 20, 2007	Kitt Peak	Spacewatch	L5	12 km	MPC · JPL
248992	2007 GG_{9}	—	April 8, 2007	Kitt Peak	Spacewatch	·	1.6 km	MPC · JPL
248993 Jonava	2007 GM_{28}	Jonava	April 14, 2007	Moletai	K. Černis, Zdanavicius, J.	·	2.5 km	MPC · JPL
248994	2007 GG_{45}	—	April 14, 2007	Kitt Peak	Spacewatch	·	1.9 km	MPC · JPL
248995	2007 HU_{48}	—	April 20, 2007	Kitt Peak	Spacewatch	NYS	2.2 km	MPC · JPL
248996	2007 HK_{62}	—	April 22, 2007	Mount Lemmon	Mount Lemmon Survey	L5	16 km	MPC · JPL
248997	2007 HP_{86}	—	April 24, 2007	Kitt Peak	Spacewatch	DOR	3.5 km	MPC · JPL
248998	2007 JH_{29}	—	May 10, 2007	Mount Lemmon	Mount Lemmon Survey	·	1.8 km	MPC · JPL
248999	2007 JL_{29}	—	May 10, 2007	Mount Lemmon	Mount Lemmon Survey	·	1.9 km	MPC · JPL
249000	2007 JX_{34}	—	May 10, 2007	Kitt Peak	Spacewatch	EOS	3.3 km	MPC · JPL

back to top

== See also ==
- Meanings of minor-planet names: 248001–249000
