= Vincenzo Silvano Casulli =

Italian astronomer

Minor planets discovered: 194
see § List of discovered minor planets

Vincenzo Silvano Casulli, usually known as Silvano Casulli (25 August 1944 – 24 July 2018) was an Italian amateur astronomer and a discoverer of minor planets at his Vallemare di Borbona Observatory (A55) in Lazio.

He is credited by the Minor Planet Center with the discovery of 192 minor planets. In 1985 he served on a team involved in using the Hubble Space Telescope in a study that focused on Transition Comets—UV Search for OH Emissions in Asteroids. He was the first amateur astronomer to obtain precise astronometric positions of minor planets using a CCD camera. He is a prolific discoverer of asteroids.

In 1997, the inner main-belt asteroid and member of the Flora family, 7132 Casulli, was named by astronomer Antonio Vagnozzi in his honor (M.P.C. 30800).

== Discoveries ==
=== 9121 Stefanovalentini ===
On 24 February 1998, he discovered 9121 Stefanovalentini at the Italian Colleverde Observatory. It is a carbonaceous asteroid from the outer regions of the main-belt, approximately 30 kilometers in diameter. Casulli also obtained a light-curve from photometric observations and determined a period of 11.84 hours for the body's rotation. He named it in honour of amateur astronomer Stefano Valentini.

=== 93061 Barbagallo ===
Together with Italian astronomer Ermes Colombini and others, he co-discovered the asteroid 93061 Barbagallo on 23 September 2000. The group-discovery is credited to the discovering observatory, Osservatorio San Vittore, Bologna. The asteroid was named after Mariano Barbagallo, an Italian colleague and friend of Colombini.

=== List of discovered minor planets ===
6339 Giliberti	20 September 1993	list
6530 Adry	12 April 1994	list
6877 Giada	10 October 1994	list
6929 Misto	31 October 1994	list
7600 Vacchi	9 September 1994	list
7665 Putignano	11 October 1994	list
7961 Ercolepoli	10 October 1994	list
8569 Mameli	1 October 1996	list
8716 Ginestra	23 September 1995	list
8742 Bonazzoli	14 February 1998	list
9121 Stefanovalentini	24 February 1998	list
10386 Romulus	12 October 1996	list
11142 Facchini	7 January 1997	list
11328 Mariotozzi	19 October 1995	list
11578 Cimabue	4 March 1994	list
12384 Luigimartella	10 October 1994	list
13197 Pontecorvo	17 February 1997	list
13653 Priscus	9 February 1997	list
13684 Borbona	27 August 1997	list
14088 Ancus	3 May 1997	list
14498 Bernini	28 February 1995	list
15007 Edoardopozio	5 July 1998	list
15353 Meucci	22 November 1994	list
15854 Numa	15 February 1996	list
15869 Tullius	8 August 1996	list

16770 Angkor Wat	30 October 1996	list
17556 Pierofrancesca	16 November 1993	list
17649 Brunorossi	17 October 1996	list
18169 Amaldi	20 August 2000	list
18509 Bellini	14 September 1996	list
18596 Superbus	21 January 1998	list
21219 Mascagni	28 November 1994	list
21311 Servius	4 December 1996	list
23564 Ungaretti	6 November 1994	list
24826 Pascoli	22 August 1995	list
24946 Foscolo	1 July 1997	list
25312 Asiapossenti	22 December 1998	list
29347 Natta	5 March 1995	list
29361 Botticelli	9 February 1996	list
29428 Ettoremajorana	31 March 1997	list
29449 Taharbenjelloun	29 August 1997	list
29470 Higgs	26 October 1997	list
31319 Vespucci	20 April 1998	list
31429 Diegoazzaro	21 January 1999	list
32891 Amatrice	9 February 1994	list
32911 Cervara	4 November 1994	list
32945 Lecce	24 November 1995	list
32987 Uyuni	4 December 1996	list
33002 Everest	17 February 1997	list
35295 Omo	1 November 1996	list

37627 Lucaparmitano	11 October 1993	list
37640 Luiginegrelli	20 November 1993	list
37683 Gustaveeiffel	19 May 1995	list
37735 Riccardomuti	1 November 1996	list
40134 Marsili	27 August 1998	list
42585 Pheidippides	30 March 1997	list
43935 Danshechtman	1 October 1996	list
(44355) 1998 ST_{2}	18 September 1998	list
48720 Enricomentana	29 September 1996	list
50866 Davidesprizzi	1 April 2000	list
51915 Andry	20 August 2001	list
52558 Pigafetta	27 March 1997	list
(52862) 1998 SR_{4}	19 September 1998	list
56038 Jackmapanje	7 December 1998	list
58417 Belzoni	25 January 1996	list
58495 Hajin	19 October 1996	list
58498 Octaviopaz	2 November 1996	list
65785 Carlafracci	26 October 1995	list
65821 De Curtis	30 October 1996	list
69460 Christibarnard	17 October 1996	list
69500 Ginobartali	6 February 1997	list
73872 Stefanoragazzi	7 January 1997	list
73891 Pietromennea	10 March 1997	list
75225 Corradoaugias	27 November 1999	list
83657 Albertosordi	12 October 2001	list

85267 Taj Mahal	12 January 1994	list
(85578) 1998 DP_{13}	26 February 1998	list
90806 Rudaki	4 January 1995	list
100292 Harmandir	28 February 1995	list
100445 Pisa	12 September 1996	list
100456 Chichn Itza	2 October 1996	list
100731 Ara Pacis	18 February 1998	list
117093 Umbria	12 July 2004	list
(120575) 1995 QD	17 August 1995	list
129555 Armazones	30 October 1996	list
134369 Sahara	17 August 1995	list
145962 Lacchini	29 December 1999	list
152227 Argoli	24 September 2005	list
160105 Gobi	26 September 2000	list
168261 Puglia	15 August 2006	list
173094 Wielicki	14 October 2007	list
181241 Dipasquale	28 October 2005	list
184620 Pippobattaglia	10 September 2005	list
185039 Alessiapossenti	30 August 2006	list
185321 Kammerlander	10 November 2006	list
185325 Anupabhagwat	14 November 2006	list
185448 Nomentum	25 December 2006	list
190139 Hansküng	14 September 2005	list
(199631) 2006 GX	2 April 2006	list
199677 Terzani	20 April 2006	list

199900 Brunoganz	8 April 2007	list
204816 Andreacamilleri	16 July 2007	list
204896 Giorgiobocca	16 October 2007	list
207563 Toscana	1 August 2006	list
210032 Enricocastellani	16 July 2006	list
210107 Pistoletto	30 August 2006	list
210182 Mazzini	26 October 2006	list
210290 Borsellino	13 October 2007	list
210345 Barbon	16 October 2007	list
212373 Pietrocascella	22 April 2006	list
212500 Robertojoppolo	4 September 2006	list
214772 UNICEF	23 October 2006	list
214819 Gianotti	10 November 2006	list
214820 Faustocoppi	14 November 2006	list
214928 Carrara	5 November 2007	list
216241 Renzopiano	14 November 2006	list
216757 Vasari	13 September 2005	list
218636 Calabria	24 September 2005	list
218866 Alexantioch	15 December 2006	list
224693 Morganfreeman	21 January 2006	list
225076 Vallemare	8 May 2007	list
227152 Zupi	5 August 2005	list
229781 Arthurmcdonald	3 August 2008	list
231265 Saulperlmutter	5 January 2006	list
233292 Brianschmidt	19 January 2006	list

236305 Adamriess	19 January 2006	list
236746 Chareslindos	8 June 2007	list
239105 Marcocattaneo	28 April 2006	list
243591 Ignacostantino	15 September 1998	list
246821 Satyarthi	27 August 2009	list
248321 Cester	14 August 2005	list
248388 Namtso	26 September 2005	list
248908 Ginostrada	15 November 2006	list
248970 Giannimorandi	19 January 2007	list
249044 Barrymarshall	15 October 2007	list
254863 Robinwarren	24 September 2005	list
255587 Gardenia	21 July 2006	list
255598 Paullauterbur	13 August 2006	list
262972 Petermansfield	9 March 2007	list
265924 Franceclemente	21 January 2006	list
267017 Yangzhifa	16 October 1995	list
268686 Elenaaprile	2 April 2006	list
273412 Eduardomissoni	18 November 2006	list
(273471) 2006 YK_{2}	16 December 2006	list
273994 Cinqueterre	11 July 2007	list
274246 Reggiacaserta	31 July 2008	list
274264 Piccolomini	5 August 2008	list
274472 Piet	28 September 2008	list
278447 Saviano	2 October 2007	list
278735 Kamioka	27 September 2008	list

(279411) 2010 FM_{6}	16 March 2010	list
282903 Masada	20 April 2007	list
(284458) 2007 GB_{1}	8 April 2007	list
288615 Tempesti	11 July 2004	list
292872 Anoushankar	12 November 2006	list
293131 Meteora	15 December 2006	list
293477 Teotihuacan	16 March 2007	list
294296 Efeso	3 November 2007	list
295471 Herbertnitsch	27 August 2008	list
299777 Tanyastreeter	21 September 2006	list
(299785) 2006 SC_{77}	22 September 2006	list
300124 Alessiazecchini	14 November 2006	list
(304203) 2006 QR_{110}	27 August 2006	list
(304277) 2006 SL_{20}	19 September 2006	list
(309762) 2008 YN_{5}	22 December 2008	list
(311907) 2007 AH_{9}	12 January 2007	list
(316098) 2009 OO_{1}	19 July 2009	list
(320377) 2007 UP	16 October 2007	list
327943 Xavierbarcons	9 March 2007	list
327982 Balducci	10 April 2007	list
330712 Rhodescolossus	3 August 2008	list
331316 Cavedon	20 April 2006	list
332632 Pharos	22 October 2008	list
345868 Halicarnassus	19 August 2007	list
(346810) 2009 CD_{40}	13 February 2009	list

(349237) 2007 TH_{69}	13 October 2007	list
349499 Dechirico	29 July 2008	list
349862 Modigliani	21 February 2009	list
351976 Borromini	23 October 2006	list
352017 Juvarra	12 November 2006	list
367392 Zeri	31 July 2008	list
374338 Fontana	25 October 2005	list
375798 Divini	12 October 2009	list
378076 Campani	23 October 2006	list
383622 Luigivolta	11 August 2007	list
385980 Emiliosegrè	9 January 2007	list
429136 Corsali	13 October 2009	list
(435161) 2007 NV_{2}	14 July 2007	list
440411 Piovani	26 August 2005	list
447682 Rambaldi	15 January 2007	list
456378 Akashikaikyo	18 October 2006	list
(457248) 2008 QH	20 August 2008	list
(483951) 2006 BM_{147}	31 January 2006	list
(509357) 2007 AZ_{19}	13 January 2007	list
