= Meanings of minor-planet names: 248001–249000 =

As minor planet discoveries are confirmed, they are given a permanent number by the IAU's Minor Planet Center (MPC), and the discoverers can then submit names for them, following the IAU's naming conventions. The list below concerns those minor planets in the specified number-range that have received names, and explains the meanings of those names.

Official naming citations of newly named small Solar System bodies are approved and published in a bulletin by IAU's Working Group for Small Bodies Nomenclature (WGSBN). Before May 2021, citations were published in MPC's Minor Planet Circulars for many decades. Recent citations can also be found on the JPL Small-Body Database (SBDB). Until his death in 2016, German astronomer Lutz D. Schmadel compiled these citations into the Dictionary of Minor Planet Names (DMP) and regularly updated the collection.

Based on Paul Herget's The Names of the Minor Planets, Schmadel also researched the unclear origin of numerous asteroids, most of which had been named prior to World War II. This article incorporates text from this source, which is in the public domain: SBDB New namings may only be added to this list below after official publication as the preannouncement of names is condemned. The WGSBN publishes a comprehensive guideline for the naming rules of non-cometary small Solar System bodies.

== 248001–248100 ==
Named minor planet	Provisional	This minor planet was named for...	Ref · Catalog
There are no named minor planets in this number range

== 248101–248200 ==
back to top

Named minor planet	Provisional	This minor planet was named for...	Ref · Catalog
248183 Peisandros	2005 AD_{28}	Peisander (Peisandros), son of Antimachus, from Greek mythology. He and his brother Hippolochos were killed by Agamemnon during the Trojan War.	JPL · 248183

== 248201–248300 ==
back to top

Named minor planet	Provisional	This minor planet was named for...	Ref · Catalog
248262 Liuxiaobo	2005 GR_{128}	Liu Xiaobo (1955–2017) received the 2010 Nobel Peace Prize for his long and nonviolent struggle for human rights in China.	JPL · 248262

== 248301–248400 ==
back to top

Named minor planet	Provisional	This minor planet was named for...	Ref · Catalog
248321 Cester	2005 PL_{20}	Bruno Cester (1920–2017), an Italian physicist and astronomer at the Astronomical Observatory of Trieste. His research included variable stars as well as (visual) double stars.	IAU · 248321
248388 Namtso	2005 SE_{19}	Namtso is a mountain lake in Tibet. It is also known as Lake Nam, Nam Co, and Tengri Nor.	JPL · 248388

== 248401–248500 ==
back to top

Named minor planet	Provisional	This minor planet was named for...	Ref · Catalog
There are no named minor planets in this number range

== 248501–248600 ==
back to top

Named minor planet	Provisional	This minor planet was named for...	Ref · Catalog
There are no named minor planets in this number range

== 248601–248700 ==
back to top

Named minor planet	Provisional	This minor planet was named for...	Ref · Catalog
There are no named minor planets in this number range

== 248701–248800 ==
back to top

Named minor planet	Provisional	This minor planet was named for...	Ref · Catalog
248717 Ódryárpád	2006 QQ_{4}	Árpád Ódry, Hungarian actor, teacher, director and theater manager.	IAU · 248717
248750 Asteroidday	2006 RH_{1}	Asteroid Day is an annual global movement that brings people from around the world together to learn about asteroids and what we can do to protect our planet from asteroid impacts. The United Nations has proclaimed that Asteroid Day will be observed globally on June 30 every year.	JPL · 248750

== 248801–248900 ==
back to top

Named minor planet	Provisional	This minor planet was named for...	Ref · Catalog
248839 Mazeikiai	2006 SY_{406}	Mažeikiai is a Lithuanian city of 45,000 inhabitants, located 280 km northwest of Vilnius on the Venta River. Mazeikiai was first mentioned in 1335 and received the rights of self-government in 1919.	JPL · 248839
248866 Margherita	2006 UN_{55}	Flavia Margherita Natalina Mazzucato (b. 1953), Retired nurse and sister of co-discoverer.	IAU · 248866

== 248901–249000 ==
back to top

Named minor planet	Provisional	This minor planet was named for...	Ref · Catalog
248908 Ginostrada	2006 VY_{45}	Gino Strada (1948–2021), an Italian surgeon and founder of Emergency, an Italian non-governmental humanitarian organization that operates in several countries all over the world	JPL · 248908
248970 Giannimorandi	2007 BC_{49}	Gianni Morandi (born 1944), an Italian singer, actor and entertainer	JPL · 248970
248993 Jonava	2007 GM_{28}	Jonava, a city in central Lithuania	JPL · 248993

back to top

Preceded by 247,001–248,000	Meanings of minor-planet names List of minor planets: 248,001–249,000	Succeeded by 249,001–250,000
