= (248835) 2006 SX368 =

Centaur

(248835) 2006 SX_{368}
Discovery
- Discovered by: A. C. Becker; A. W. Puckett; J. Kubica
- Discovery site: Apache Point Obs.
- Discovery date: 16 September 2006

Designations
- Minor planet category: centaur · distant

Orbital characteristics
- Epoch 4 September 2017 (JD 2458000.5)
- Uncertainty parameter 3 · 1
- Observation arc: 5.91 yr (2,160 days)
- Aphelion: 32.049 AU
- Perihelion: 11.945 AU
- Semi-major axis: 21.997 AU
- Eccentricity: 0.4570
- Orbital period (sidereal): 103.17 yr (37,683 d)
- Mean anomaly: 25.503°
- Mean motion: 0° 0^{m} 34.56^{s} / day
- Inclination: 36.325°
- Longitude of ascending node: 280.00°
- Argument of perihelion: 70.489°
- T_{Jupiter}: 3.183

Physical characteristics
- Mean diameter: 76 km 78.44±22.63 km
- Geometric albedo: 0.046±0.018; 0.052
- Spectral type: BR; B–R = 1.27
- Absolute magnitude (H): 9.5

(248835) 2006 SX_{368} is a centaur, approximately 75 kilometers (47 miles) in diameter, orbiting in the outer Solar System between Saturn and Neptune. It was discovered on 16 September 2006, by American astronomers Andrew Becker, Andrew Puckett, and Jeremy Kubica at Apache Point Observatory in Sunspot, New Mexico.

== Orbit and classification ==
Centaurs are dynamically unstable due to strong interactions with the giant planets. The orbit of 2006 SX_{368} is unusually eccentric — near its perihelion, it comes under the influence of Uranus, while at the aphelion it travels slightly beyond the orbit of Neptune.

It orbits the Sun at a distance of 11.9–32.0 AU once every 103 years and 2 months (37,683 days; semi-major axis of 22.0 AU). Its orbit has an eccentricity of 0.46 and an inclination of 36° with respect to the ecliptic. The body's observation arc begins with its official discovery observation at Apache Point in September 2006.

== Physical characteristics ==
In 2010, thermal flux from 2006 SX_{368} in the far-infrared was measured by the Herschel Space Telescope. As a result, its equivalent size was estimated to lie within a range from 70 kilometres (43 mi) to 80 kilometres (50 mi).
