= (248590) 2006 CS =

Near-Earth Apollo-group asteroid

Discovery
- Discovered by: Siding Spring Survey
- Discovery date: 1 February 2006

Designations
- Minor planet category: NEO · Apollo extinct comet

Orbital characteristics
- Epoch 13 September 2023 (JD 2460200.5)
- Uncertainty parameter 0
- Observation arc: 9207 days (25.21 yr)
- Aphelion: 4.94567 AU (739.862 Gm)
- Perihelion: 0.88395 AU (132.237 Gm)
- Semi-major axis: 2.91481 AU (436.049 Gm)
- Eccentricity: 0.6967
- Orbital period (sidereal): 4.976 yr (1817.7 d)
- Mean anomaly: 179.5311°
- Inclination: 52.2976°
- Longitude of ascending node: 172.4120°
- Argument of perihelion: 346.4278°
- Earth MOID: 0.1006 AU (15.05 Gm)
- Jupiter MOID: 0.3293 AU (49.26 Gm)
- T_{Jupiter}: 2.442

Physical characteristics
- Dimensions: 4.73 ± 0.84 km
- Absolute magnitude (H): 16.32

(248590) 2006 CS is an asteroid, classified as a near-Earth object of the Apollo group and probably a dormant Jupiter family comet. It was discovered on 1 February 2006 by the Siding Spring Survey. The object has been suggested to be the progenitor body of the β Tucanids or δ Mensids meteor showers, being, according to Diego Janches et al, a better candidate than the previously suggested comet C/1976 D1 (Bradfield). They also suggest the two showers are actually one and the same. The meteor shower produced outbursts in 2020 and 2024.
