= List of minor planets: 634001–635000 =

The following is a partial list of minor planets, running from minor-planet number 634001 through 635000, inclusive. The primary data for this and other partial lists is based on JPL's "Small-Body Orbital Elements" and data available from the Minor Planet Center. Critical list information is also provided by the MPC, unless otherwise specified from Lowell Observatory. A detailed description of the table's columns and additional sources are given on the main page including a complete list of every page in this series, and a statistical break-up on the dynamical classification of minor planets.

Also see the summary list of all named bodies in numerical and alphabetical order, and the corresponding naming citations for the number range of this particular list. New namings may only be added to this list after official publication, as the preannouncement of names is condemned by the Working Group for Small Bodies Nomenclature of the International Astronomical Union.

Near-Earth obj.	MBA (inner)	MBA (outer)	Centaur
Mars-crosser	MBA (middle)	Jupiter trojan	Trans-Neptunian obj.
Unclassified

== 634001–634100 ==
Designation			Discovery			Properties		Ref
Permanent	Provisional	Named after	Date	Site	Discoverer(s)	Category	Diam.	Ref
634001	2010 VU_{145}	—	January 19, 2012	Haleakala	Pan-STARRS 1	·	1.6 km	MPC · JPL
634002	2010 VN_{176}	—	December 5, 2002	Kitt Peak	Spacewatch	ADE	2.3 km	MPC · JPL
634003	2010 VV_{180}	—	September 25, 2009	Kitt Peak	Spacewatch	L4	6.9 km	MPC · JPL
634004	2010 VW_{182}	—	November 12, 2010	Mount Lemmon	Mount Lemmon Survey	·	1.3 km	MPC · JPL
634005	2010 VE_{190}	—	November 1, 2010	Kitt Peak	Spacewatch	·	3.2 km	MPC · JPL
634006	2010 VJ_{198}	—	November 15, 2010	Mount Lemmon	Mount Lemmon Survey	·	2.3 km	MPC · JPL
634007	2010 VH_{209}	—	November 10, 2006	Kitt Peak	Spacewatch	(1547)	1.3 km	MPC · JPL
634008	2010 VJ_{225}	—	November 1, 2010	Mount Lemmon	Mount Lemmon Survey	L4	6.3 km	MPC · JPL
634009	2010 VC_{228}	—	November 8, 2010	Mount Lemmon	Mount Lemmon Survey	·	630 m	MPC · JPL
634010	2010 VT_{230}	—	November 2, 2010	Mount Lemmon	Mount Lemmon Survey	·	1.0 km	MPC · JPL
634011	2010 VS_{232}	—	March 14, 2012	Haleakala	Pan-STARRS 1	·	1.7 km	MPC · JPL
634012	2010 VR_{238}	—	November 1, 2010	Mount Lemmon	Mount Lemmon Survey	GEF	940 m	MPC · JPL
634013	2010 VS_{244}	—	March 24, 2015	Haleakala	Pan-STARRS 1	L4	6.1 km	MPC · JPL
634014	2010 VH_{249}	—	August 25, 2003	Cerro Tololo	Deep Ecliptic Survey	·	560 m	MPC · JPL
634015	2010 VA_{252}	—	November 5, 2010	Kitt Peak	Spacewatch	·	640 m	MPC · JPL
634016	2010 VB_{252}	—	November 1, 2010	Kitt Peak	Spacewatch	·	490 m	MPC · JPL
634017	2010 VL_{252}	—	November 8, 2010	Mount Lemmon	Mount Lemmon Survey	·	1.4 km	MPC · JPL
634018	2010 VE_{263}	—	November 1, 2010	Kitt Peak	Spacewatch	L4	7.9 km	MPC · JPL
634019	2010 VC_{265}	—	November 11, 2010	Mount Lemmon	Mount Lemmon Survey	·	1.1 km	MPC · JPL
634020	2010 VJ_{266}	—	November 6, 2010	Mount Lemmon	Mount Lemmon Survey	·	1.7 km	MPC · JPL
634021	2010 VD_{273}	—	November 12, 2010	Mount Lemmon	Mount Lemmon Survey	·	1.6 km	MPC · JPL
634022	2010 VF_{275}	—	November 13, 2010	Mount Lemmon	Mount Lemmon Survey	L4	7.3 km	MPC · JPL
634023	2010 WN_{2}	—	November 26, 2010	Mount Lemmon	Mount Lemmon Survey	·	1.4 km	MPC · JPL
634024	2010 WJ_{4}	—	October 13, 2005	Kitt Peak	Spacewatch	·	1.7 km	MPC · JPL
634025	2010 WW_{5}	—	September 23, 2005	Kitt Peak	Spacewatch	HOF	2.3 km	MPC · JPL
634026	2010 WM_{16}	—	October 14, 2010	Mount Lemmon	Mount Lemmon Survey	·	1.7 km	MPC · JPL
634027	2010 WF_{27}	—	August 23, 2006	Palomar	NEAT	·	800 m	MPC · JPL
634028	2010 WG_{27}	—	November 27, 2010	Mount Lemmon	Mount Lemmon Survey	·	1.4 km	MPC · JPL
634029	2010 WC_{31}	—	November 27, 2010	Mount Lemmon	Mount Lemmon Survey	·	550 m	MPC · JPL
634030	2010 WD_{40}	—	November 27, 2010	Mount Lemmon	Mount Lemmon Survey	·	1.5 km	MPC · JPL
634031	2010 WU_{42}	—	November 27, 2010	Mount Lemmon	Mount Lemmon Survey	·	1.3 km	MPC · JPL
634032	2010 WL_{44}	—	October 19, 2003	Kitt Peak	Spacewatch	·	740 m	MPC · JPL
634033	2010 WU_{61}	—	November 27, 2010	Mount Lemmon	Mount Lemmon Survey	·	1.5 km	MPC · JPL
634034	2010 XB_{22}	—	December 4, 2010	Piszkés-tető	K. Sárneczky, S. Kürti	L4	6.1 km	MPC · JPL
634035	2010 XO_{25}	—	September 25, 2003	Palomar	NEAT	·	720 m	MPC · JPL
634036	2010 XU_{55}	—	February 28, 2008	Mount Lemmon	Mount Lemmon Survey	·	720 m	MPC · JPL
634037	2010 XU_{56}	—	December 30, 2007	Kitt Peak	Spacewatch	·	600 m	MPC · JPL
634038	2010 XR_{60}	—	December 10, 2010	Kitt Peak	Spacewatch	·	2.3 km	MPC · JPL
634039	2010 XS_{60}	—	October 23, 2003	Kitt Peak	Spacewatch	·	560 m	MPC · JPL
634040	2010 XR_{70}	—	September 5, 2010	Mount Lemmon	Mount Lemmon Survey	L4	7.8 km	MPC · JPL
634041	2010 XJ_{74}	—	November 8, 2010	Mount Lemmon	Mount Lemmon Survey	L4	9.1 km	MPC · JPL
634042	2010 XL_{82}	—	August 16, 2006	Palomar	NEAT	·	740 m	MPC · JPL
634043	2010 XJ_{92}	—	December 1, 2010	Mount Lemmon	Mount Lemmon Survey	V	490 m	MPC · JPL
634044	2010 XY_{95}	—	February 25, 2012	Mount Lemmon	Mount Lemmon Survey	·	1.4 km	MPC · JPL
634045	2010 XU_{111}	—	December 14, 2010	Mount Lemmon	Mount Lemmon Survey	AST	1.4 km	MPC · JPL
634046	2010 XW_{118}	—	December 5, 2010	Mount Lemmon	Mount Lemmon Survey	·	1.6 km	MPC · JPL
634047	2010 YM_{2}	—	December 30, 2010	Piszkés-tető	K. Sárneczky, Z. Kuli	·	1.9 km	MPC · JPL
634048	2011 AB_{4}	—	September 19, 2006	Kitt Peak	Spacewatch	V	520 m	MPC · JPL
634049	2011 AQ_{7}	—	December 2, 2010	Kitt Peak	Spacewatch	·	1.6 km	MPC · JPL
634050	2011 AR_{8}	—	October 18, 2006	Kitt Peak	Spacewatch	·	1.1 km	MPC · JPL
634051	2011 AQ_{34}	—	December 25, 2005	Kitt Peak	Spacewatch	HYG	3.3 km	MPC · JPL
634052	2011 AH_{36}	—	January 3, 2011	Piszkéstető	K. Sárneczky, Z. Kuli	·	1.9 km	MPC · JPL
634053	2011 AT_{50}	—	September 26, 2006	Catalina	CSS	·	710 m	MPC · JPL
634054	2011 AQ_{54}	—	January 14, 2011	Mount Lemmon	Mount Lemmon Survey	·	2.3 km	MPC · JPL
634055	2011 AG_{60}	—	November 19, 2003	Palomar	NEAT	·	620 m	MPC · JPL
634056	2011 AR_{65}	—	January 14, 2011	Kitt Peak	Spacewatch	·	650 m	MPC · JPL
634057	2011 AA_{67}	—	July 27, 2009	Kitt Peak	Spacewatch	·	780 m	MPC · JPL
634058	2011 AU_{72}	—	October 16, 2002	Palomar	NEAT	·	1.8 km	MPC · JPL
634059	2011 AW_{76}	—	January 2, 2011	Mount Lemmon	Mount Lemmon Survey	·	1.3 km	MPC · JPL
634060	2011 AS_{81}	—	September 15, 2004	Kitt Peak	Spacewatch	NEM	2.5 km	MPC · JPL
634061	2011 AU_{82}	—	January 12, 2011	Mount Lemmon	Mount Lemmon Survey	(1338) (FLO)	490 m	MPC · JPL
634062	2011 AS_{83}	—	January 8, 2011	Mount Lemmon	Mount Lemmon Survey	·	780 m	MPC · JPL
634063	2011 AX_{83}	—	January 14, 2011	Kitt Peak	Spacewatch	·	860 m	MPC · JPL
634064	2011 AG_{89}	—	April 20, 2012	Mount Lemmon	Mount Lemmon Survey	·	1.9 km	MPC · JPL
634065	2011 AT_{92}	—	November 14, 2013	Mount Lemmon	Mount Lemmon Survey	·	510 m	MPC · JPL
634066	2011 AL_{94}	—	January 2, 2011	Mount Lemmon	Mount Lemmon Survey	KOR	1.2 km	MPC · JPL
634067	2011 AK_{95}	—	January 13, 2011	Mount Lemmon	Mount Lemmon Survey	·	1.4 km	MPC · JPL
634068	2011 AQ_{108}	—	January 14, 2011	Mount Lemmon	Mount Lemmon Survey	·	700 m	MPC · JPL
634069	2011 AK_{110}	—	January 14, 2011	Mount Lemmon	Mount Lemmon Survey	·	1.4 km	MPC · JPL
634070	2011 BZ_{5}	—	October 24, 2005	Mauna Kea	A. Boattini	THM	2.5 km	MPC · JPL
634071	2011 BU_{9}	—	October 20, 2003	Palomar	NEAT	·	3.5 km	MPC · JPL
634072	2011 BY_{13}	—	January 24, 2011	Mount Lemmon	Mount Lemmon Survey	·	3.9 km	MPC · JPL
634073	2011 BM_{14}	—	January 17, 2007	Kitt Peak	Spacewatch	·	2.4 km	MPC · JPL
634074	2011 BH_{26}	—	December 5, 2010	Mount Lemmon	Mount Lemmon Survey	·	1.5 km	MPC · JPL
634075	2011 BK_{29}	—	January 26, 2011	Mount Lemmon	Mount Lemmon Survey	·	1.5 km	MPC · JPL
634076	2011 BQ_{34}	—	January 28, 2011	Mount Lemmon	Mount Lemmon Survey	BRA	1.2 km	MPC · JPL
634077	2011 BT_{34}	—	October 7, 2005	Mauna Kea	A. Boattini	·	2.4 km	MPC · JPL
634078	2011 BT_{36}	—	January 28, 2011	Mount Lemmon	Mount Lemmon Survey	·	660 m	MPC · JPL
634079	2011 BE_{44}	—	January 30, 2011	Piszkés-tető	K. Sárneczky, Z. Kuli	·	2.8 km	MPC · JPL
634080	2011 BV_{44}	—	January 31, 2011	Piszkés-tető	K. Sárneczky, Z. Kuli	·	1.1 km	MPC · JPL
634081	2011 BY_{50}	—	January 30, 2011	Mount Lemmon	Mount Lemmon Survey	·	870 m	MPC · JPL
634082	2011 BB_{51}	—	January 30, 2011	Mount Lemmon	Mount Lemmon Survey	H	670 m	MPC · JPL
634083	2011 BN_{56}	—	December 14, 2003	Kitt Peak	Spacewatch	·	880 m	MPC · JPL
634084	2011 BU_{56}	—	January 30, 2011	Mount Lemmon	Mount Lemmon Survey	PHO	850 m	MPC · JPL
634085	2011 BO_{66}	—	February 1, 2011	Piszkés-tető	K. Sárneczky, Z. Kuli	·	1.4 km	MPC · JPL
634086	2011 BG_{69}	—	January 29, 2011	Mount Lemmon	Mount Lemmon Survey	·	2.9 km	MPC · JPL
634087	2011 BL_{70}	—	January 27, 2011	Kitt Peak	Spacewatch	·	1.4 km	MPC · JPL
634088	2011 BC_{71}	—	September 22, 2009	Mount Lemmon	Mount Lemmon Survey	CLA	1.3 km	MPC · JPL
634089	2011 BE_{72}	—	October 13, 2005	Kitt Peak	Spacewatch	·	1.1 km	MPC · JPL
634090	2011 BH_{76}	—	August 31, 2005	Kitt Peak	Spacewatch	·	1.2 km	MPC · JPL
634091	2011 BK_{81}	—	October 30, 2005	Mount Lemmon	Mount Lemmon Survey	·	1.6 km	MPC · JPL
634092	2011 BB_{87}	—	January 27, 2011	Mount Lemmon	Mount Lemmon Survey	·	690 m	MPC · JPL
634093	2011 BH_{87}	—	August 15, 2009	Catalina	CSS	·	800 m	MPC · JPL
634094	2011 BU_{92}	—	September 30, 2006	Kitt Peak	Spacewatch	·	630 m	MPC · JPL
634095	2011 BW_{93}	—	October 3, 2006	Mount Lemmon	Mount Lemmon Survey	·	750 m	MPC · JPL
634096	2011 BL_{94}	—	March 6, 2008	Mount Lemmon	Mount Lemmon Survey	·	710 m	MPC · JPL
634097	2011 BO_{99}	—	January 16, 2004	Kitt Peak	Spacewatch	·	760 m	MPC · JPL
634098	2011 BJ_{103}	—	January 23, 2006	Kitt Peak	Spacewatch	·	1.9 km	MPC · JPL
634099	2011 BH_{105}	—	January 26, 2011	Kitt Peak	Spacewatch	·	1.8 km	MPC · JPL
634100	2011 BW_{105}	—	September 24, 2009	Zelenchukskaya Station	T. V. Krjačko, B. Satovski	·	1.7 km	MPC · JPL

== 634101–634200 ==
back to top

Designation			Discovery			Properties		Ref
Permanent	Provisional	Named after	Date	Site	Discoverer(s)	Category	Diam.	Ref
634101	2011 BZ_{121}	—	September 29, 2009	Mount Lemmon	Mount Lemmon Survey	·	750 m	MPC · JPL
634102	2011 BG_{122}	—	January 30, 2011	Mount Lemmon	Mount Lemmon Survey	·	840 m	MPC · JPL
634103	2011 BS_{126}	—	December 25, 2005	Kitt Peak	Spacewatch	KOR	1.3 km	MPC · JPL
634104	2011 BQ_{127}	—	January 28, 2011	Mount Lemmon	Mount Lemmon Survey	AST	1.4 km	MPC · JPL
634105	2011 BK_{128}	—	January 28, 2011	Mount Lemmon	Mount Lemmon Survey	·	1.2 km	MPC · JPL
634106	2011 BG_{131}	—	January 28, 2011	Mount Lemmon	Mount Lemmon Survey	·	1.7 km	MPC · JPL
634107	2011 BP_{133}	—	January 29, 2011	Mount Lemmon	Mount Lemmon Survey	KOR	1.1 km	MPC · JPL
634108	2011 BM_{136}	—	October 4, 1999	Kitt Peak	Spacewatch	·	1.8 km	MPC · JPL
634109	2011 BS_{137}	—	January 8, 2011	Mount Lemmon	Mount Lemmon Survey	·	570 m	MPC · JPL
634110	2011 BB_{139}	—	January 8, 2011	Mount Lemmon	Mount Lemmon Survey	·	1.6 km	MPC · JPL
634111	2011 BU_{145}	—	September 15, 2006	Kitt Peak	Spacewatch	·	540 m	MPC · JPL
634112	2011 BD_{154}	—	October 18, 2003	Apache Point	SDSS Collaboration	·	2.2 km	MPC · JPL
634113	2011 BH_{156}	—	January 28, 2011	Mount Lemmon	Mount Lemmon Survey	·	670 m	MPC · JPL
634114	2011 BK_{169}	—	January 27, 2011	Catalina	CSS	PHO	1.2 km	MPC · JPL
634115	2011 BV_{174}	—	March 2, 2011	Mount Lemmon	Mount Lemmon Survey	·	680 m	MPC · JPL
634116	2011 BT_{181}	—	February 4, 2016	Haleakala	Pan-STARRS 1	·	2.2 km	MPC · JPL
634117	2011 BO_{187}	—	January 30, 2011	Haleakala	Pan-STARRS 1	·	820 m	MPC · JPL
634118	2011 BS_{195}	—	January 26, 2011	Mount Lemmon	Mount Lemmon Survey	·	610 m	MPC · JPL
634119	2011 BL_{196}	—	January 29, 2011	Mount Lemmon	Mount Lemmon Survey	·	1.2 km	MPC · JPL
634120	2011 BQ_{196}	—	January 30, 2011	Mount Lemmon	Mount Lemmon Survey	V	400 m	MPC · JPL
634121	2011 BU_{198}	—	January 26, 2011	Mount Lemmon	Mount Lemmon Survey	·	2.9 km	MPC · JPL
634122	2011 BQ_{201}	—	January 29, 2011	Mount Lemmon	Mount Lemmon Survey	KOR	1.0 km	MPC · JPL
634123	2011 CX_{3}	—	December 24, 2005	Kitt Peak	Spacewatch	·	1.8 km	MPC · JPL
634124	2011 CR_{16}	—	July 15, 2005	Mount Lemmon	Mount Lemmon Survey	·	720 m	MPC · JPL
634125	2011 CN_{29}	—	August 9, 2008	La Sagra	OAM	·	3.4 km	MPC · JPL
634126	2011 CX_{29}	—	March 13, 2004	Palomar	NEAT	·	970 m	MPC · JPL
634127	2011 CH_{39}	—	October 20, 2006	Kitt Peak	Spacewatch	·	840 m	MPC · JPL
634128	2011 CP_{42}	—	February 10, 2011	Mount Lemmon	Mount Lemmon Survey	·	1.7 km	MPC · JPL
634129	2011 CC_{50}	—	February 12, 2011	Mount Lemmon	Mount Lemmon Survey	H	570 m	MPC · JPL
634130	2011 CY_{50}	—	February 11, 2011	Mount Lemmon	Mount Lemmon Survey	·	870 m	MPC · JPL
634131	2011 CZ_{51}	—	February 7, 2011	Mount Lemmon	Mount Lemmon Survey	AST	1.4 km	MPC · JPL
634132	2011 CL_{53}	—	August 30, 2005	Kitt Peak	Spacewatch	MAS	730 m	MPC · JPL
634133	2011 CO_{59}	—	February 8, 2011	Mount Lemmon	Mount Lemmon Survey	·	1.5 km	MPC · JPL
634134	2011 CP_{60}	—	April 16, 2004	Palomar	NEAT	·	980 m	MPC · JPL
634135	2011 CE_{65}	—	January 30, 2011	Mount Lemmon	Mount Lemmon Survey	V	680 m	MPC · JPL
634136	2011 CV_{65}	—	March 27, 2008	Kitt Peak	Spacewatch	·	710 m	MPC · JPL
634137	2011 CS_{66}	—	January 12, 2011	Mount Lemmon	Mount Lemmon Survey	·	3.6 km	MPC · JPL
634138	2011 CN_{68}	—	February 4, 2011	Catalina	CSS	·	1.7 km	MPC · JPL
634139	2011 CH_{69}	—	March 15, 2004	Palomar	NEAT	PHO	1.1 km	MPC · JPL
634140	2011 CG_{70}	—	January 5, 2006	Mount Lemmon	Mount Lemmon Survey	TIR	3.9 km	MPC · JPL
634141	2011 CW_{73}	—	November 25, 2006	Catalina	CSS	·	1.4 km	MPC · JPL
634142	2011 CR_{76}	—	November 17, 2006	Kitt Peak	Spacewatch	·	700 m	MPC · JPL
634143	2011 CM_{89}	—	February 12, 2011	Mount Lemmon	Mount Lemmon Survey	·	1.9 km	MPC · JPL
634144	2011 CU_{101}	—	October 24, 2003	Apache Point	SDSS Collaboration	EOS	1.8 km	MPC · JPL
634145	2011 CS_{104}	—	February 8, 2011	Kitt Peak	Spacewatch	·	990 m	MPC · JPL
634146	2011 CQ_{105}	—	December 15, 2006	Kitt Peak	Spacewatch	·	1 km	MPC · JPL
634147	2011 CT_{105}	—	February 26, 2011	Mount Lemmon	Mount Lemmon Survey	·	610 m	MPC · JPL
634148	2011 CF_{109}	—	July 12, 2005	Mount Lemmon	Mount Lemmon Survey	V	640 m	MPC · JPL
634149	2011 CR_{111}	—	February 5, 2011	Haleakala	Pan-STARRS 1	·	1.4 km	MPC · JPL
634150	2011 CK_{132}	—	February 7, 2011	Mount Lemmon	Mount Lemmon Survey	·	1.3 km	MPC · JPL
634151	2011 CS_{134}	—	February 10, 2011	Mount Lemmon	Mount Lemmon Survey	·	1.5 km	MPC · JPL
634152	2011 CN_{138}	—	February 10, 2011	Mount Lemmon	Mount Lemmon Survey	HOF	1.9 km	MPC · JPL
634153	2011 CS_{151}	—	February 10, 2011	Mount Lemmon	Mount Lemmon Survey	HOF	1.7 km	MPC · JPL
634154	2011 CV_{151}	—	February 5, 2011	Haleakala	Pan-STARRS 1	·	1.6 km	MPC · JPL
634155	2011 CH_{152}	—	February 10, 2011	Mount Lemmon	Mount Lemmon Survey	HOF	1.8 km	MPC · JPL
634156	2011 DM_{3}	—	September 1, 2005	Palomar	NEAT	PHO	1.2 km	MPC · JPL
634157	2011 DA_{6}	—	February 23, 2011	Catalina	CSS	·	1.1 km	MPC · JPL
634158	2011 DL_{9}	—	February 25, 2011	Mount Lemmon	Mount Lemmon Survey	·	1.8 km	MPC · JPL
634159	2011 DM_{9}	—	July 16, 2004	Cerro Tololo	Deep Ecliptic Survey	·	1.6 km	MPC · JPL
634160	2011 DH_{16}	—	November 18, 2006	Mount Lemmon	Mount Lemmon Survey	·	690 m	MPC · JPL
634161	2011 DY_{21}	—	April 1, 2003	Apache Point	SDSS Collaboration	·	1.8 km	MPC · JPL
634162	2011 DJ_{25}	—	September 22, 2009	Bergisch Gladbach	W. Bickel	·	2.0 km	MPC · JPL
634163	2011 DN_{26}	—	February 25, 2011	Mount Lemmon	Mount Lemmon Survey	MAS	620 m	MPC · JPL
634164	2011 DV_{26}	—	March 28, 2008	Kitt Peak	Spacewatch	·	1.5 km	MPC · JPL
634165	2011 DN_{36}	—	October 9, 2008	Mount Lemmon	Mount Lemmon Survey	·	3.5 km	MPC · JPL
634166	2011 DD_{37}	—	February 25, 2011	Mount Lemmon	Mount Lemmon Survey	EOS	1.3 km	MPC · JPL
634167	2011 DF_{38}	—	February 25, 2011	Mount Lemmon	Mount Lemmon Survey	·	720 m	MPC · JPL
634168	2011 DS_{51}	—	March 16, 2004	Socorro	LINEAR	PHO	1.3 km	MPC · JPL
634169	2011 DC_{55}	—	May 2, 2016	Haleakala	Pan-STARRS 1	·	1.9 km	MPC · JPL
634170	2011 EV	—	March 10, 2004	Palomar	NEAT	·	1.2 km	MPC · JPL
634171	2011 ET_{1}	—	January 22, 2002	Kitt Peak	Spacewatch	·	1.5 km	MPC · JPL
634172	2011 EV_{2}	—	September 3, 2008	Kitt Peak	Spacewatch	·	3.1 km	MPC · JPL
634173	2011 EN_{4}	—	March 1, 2011	Kitt Peak	Spacewatch	EOS	1.5 km	MPC · JPL
634174	2011 EF_{9}	—	February 8, 2000	Kitt Peak	Spacewatch	MAS	590 m	MPC · JPL
634175	2011 EC_{11}	—	March 3, 2011	Mount Lemmon	Mount Lemmon Survey	·	1.3 km	MPC · JPL
634176	2011 EW_{13}	—	December 9, 2006	Palomar	NEAT	·	1.1 km	MPC · JPL
634177	2011 ED_{15}	—	March 26, 2006	Kitt Peak	Spacewatch	·	2.8 km	MPC · JPL
634178	2011 EA_{21}	—	September 24, 2009	Mount Lemmon	Mount Lemmon Survey	·	1.2 km	MPC · JPL
634179	2011 ER_{22}	—	February 16, 2004	Kitt Peak	Spacewatch	·	860 m	MPC · JPL
634180	2011 EQ_{27}	—	December 14, 2006	Kitt Peak	Spacewatch	·	690 m	MPC · JPL
634181	2011 EQ_{30}	—	March 5, 2011	Catalina	CSS	·	760 m	MPC · JPL
634182	2011 EW_{32}	—	March 4, 2011	Kitt Peak	Spacewatch	·	970 m	MPC · JPL
634183	2011 EA_{37}	—	October 7, 2008	Kitt Peak	Spacewatch	·	3.8 km	MPC · JPL
634184	2011 EF_{37}	—	February 9, 2005	La Silla	A. Boattini	·	2.7 km	MPC · JPL
634185	2011 EM_{41}	—	October 23, 2009	Kitt Peak	Spacewatch	NEM	2.3 km	MPC · JPL
634186	2011 EL_{43}	—	March 6, 2011	Catalina	CSS	·	910 m	MPC · JPL
634187	2011 EM_{43}	—	September 2, 2002	Kitt Peak	Spacewatch	·	2.5 km	MPC · JPL
634188	2011 EP_{46}	—	March 10, 2011	Kitt Peak	Spacewatch	·	650 m	MPC · JPL
634189	2011 EK_{48}	—	August 4, 2005	Palomar	NEAT	V	820 m	MPC · JPL
634190	2011 EK_{49}	—	December 20, 2004	Mount Lemmon	Mount Lemmon Survey	·	2.2 km	MPC · JPL
634191	2011 EQ_{51}	—	October 20, 1999	Kitt Peak	Spacewatch	(2076)	620 m	MPC · JPL
634192	2011 EN_{52}	—	November 20, 2006	Kitt Peak	Spacewatch	·	640 m	MPC · JPL
634193	2011 EC_{54}	—	January 28, 2007	Mount Lemmon	Mount Lemmon Survey	·	1.1 km	MPC · JPL
634194	2011 EO_{54}	—	September 22, 2009	Mount Lemmon	Mount Lemmon Survey	·	1.7 km	MPC · JPL
634195	2011 EJ_{55}	—	October 13, 2004	Kitt Peak	Spacewatch	HOF	2.6 km	MPC · JPL
634196	2011 EA_{63}	—	February 16, 2004	Kitt Peak	Spacewatch	V	470 m	MPC · JPL
634197	2011 EH_{64}	—	March 9, 2011	Mount Lemmon	Mount Lemmon Survey	(2076)	660 m	MPC · JPL
634198	2011 EC_{65}	—	March 9, 2011	Mount Lemmon	Mount Lemmon Survey	·	1.0 km	MPC · JPL
634199	2011 EK_{70}	—	April 12, 2004	Palomar	NEAT	·	900 m	MPC · JPL
634200	2011 EE_{72}	—	February 11, 2011	Catalina	CSS	·	1.1 km	MPC · JPL

== 634201–634300 ==
back to top

Designation			Discovery			Properties		Ref
Permanent	Provisional	Named after	Date	Site	Discoverer(s)	Category	Diam.	Ref
634201	2011 EH_{76}	—	December 24, 2006	Kitt Peak	Spacewatch	·	1.2 km	MPC · JPL
634202	2011 EV_{77}	—	September 28, 2009	Mount Lemmon	Mount Lemmon Survey	·	820 m	MPC · JPL
634203	2011 EB_{80}	—	March 13, 2011	Mount Lemmon	Mount Lemmon Survey	·	740 m	MPC · JPL
634204	2011 EY_{82}	—	March 11, 2011	Kitt Peak	Spacewatch	·	970 m	MPC · JPL
634205	2011 EK_{84}	—	May 15, 2001	Haleakala	NEAT	·	3.2 km	MPC · JPL
634206	2011 EG_{85}	—	March 14, 2011	Mount Lemmon	Mount Lemmon Survey	·	2.6 km	MPC · JPL
634207	2011 EW_{90}	—	March 14, 2011	Mount Lemmon	Mount Lemmon Survey	·	1.1 km	MPC · JPL
634208	2011 EC_{91}	—	March 2, 2011	Mount Lemmon	Mount Lemmon Survey	·	1.1 km	MPC · JPL
634209	2011 ED_{100}	—	March 9, 2011	Mount Lemmon	Mount Lemmon Survey	·	1.9 km	MPC · JPL
634210	2011 ES_{100}	—	March 5, 2011	Mount Lemmon	Mount Lemmon Survey	·	1.9 km	MPC · JPL
634211	2011 EB_{104}	—	March 1, 2011	Mount Lemmon	Mount Lemmon Survey	·	1.4 km	MPC · JPL
634212	2011 EJ_{106}	—	March 13, 2011	Kitt Peak	Spacewatch	·	1.0 km	MPC · JPL
634213	2011 FO_{3}	—	March 9, 2011	Moletai	K. Černis	·	1.1 km	MPC · JPL
634214	2011 FH_{13}	—	December 1, 2006	Mount Lemmon	Mount Lemmon Survey	·	840 m	MPC · JPL
634215	2011 FD_{15}	—	February 23, 2011	Kitt Peak	Spacewatch	·	820 m	MPC · JPL
634216	2011 FF_{16}	—	October 24, 2009	Kitt Peak	Spacewatch	V	620 m	MPC · JPL
634217	2011 FQ_{20}	—	October 14, 2001	Apache Point	SDSS	·	1.0 km	MPC · JPL
634218	2011 FW_{22}	—	March 29, 2011	Catalina	CSS	·	1.1 km	MPC · JPL
634219	2011 FG_{23}	—	March 27, 2004	Kitt Peak	Spacewatch	NYS	1.2 km	MPC · JPL
634220	2011 FF_{25}	—	March 29, 2011	Piszkés-tető	K. Sárneczky, Z. Kuli	·	2.5 km	MPC · JPL
634221	2011 FP_{25}	—	March 29, 2011	Piszkés-tető	K. Sárneczky, Z. Kuli	·	1.0 km	MPC · JPL
634222	2011 FW_{26}	—	March 30, 2011	Piszkés-tető	K. Sárneczky, Z. Kuli	EOS	1.7 km	MPC · JPL
634223	2011 FY_{26}	—	March 30, 2011	Piszkés-tető	K. Sárneczky, Z. Kuli	·	1.4 km	MPC · JPL
634224	2011 FZ_{26}	—	March 30, 2011	Piszkés-tető	K. Sárneczky, Z. Kuli	·	3.0 km	MPC · JPL
634225	2011 FD_{29}	—	June 2, 2008	Mount Lemmon	Mount Lemmon Survey	·	1.1 km	MPC · JPL
634226	2011 FH_{31}	—	August 19, 2001	Cerro Tololo	Deep Ecliptic Survey	·	3.2 km	MPC · JPL
634227	2011 FQ_{33}	—	April 12, 2004	Bergisch Gladbach	W. Bickel	·	760 m	MPC · JPL
634228	2011 FB_{35}	—	November 25, 2005	Mount Lemmon	Mount Lemmon Survey	·	1.2 km	MPC · JPL
634229	2011 FZ_{37}	—	March 2, 2005	Catalina	CSS	·	4.1 km	MPC · JPL
634230	2011 FM_{39}	—	March 26, 2004	Kitt Peak	Spacewatch	·	950 m	MPC · JPL
634231	2011 FP_{41}	—	March 26, 2011	Mount Lemmon	Mount Lemmon Survey	EOS	1.6 km	MPC · JPL
634232	2011 FX_{44}	—	April 8, 2002	Palomar	NEAT	·	2.5 km	MPC · JPL
634233	2011 FN_{46}	—	September 14, 2007	Mount Lemmon	Mount Lemmon Survey	THM	2.1 km	MPC · JPL
634234	2011 FR_{48}	—	May 9, 2006	Mount Lemmon	Mount Lemmon Survey	·	1.6 km	MPC · JPL
634235	2011 FC_{52}	—	January 17, 2007	Kitt Peak	Spacewatch	MAS	700 m	MPC · JPL
634236	2011 FD_{54}	—	April 14, 2004	Kitt Peak	Spacewatch	·	1.0 km	MPC · JPL
634237	2011 FJ_{54}	—	March 29, 2011	Mount Lemmon	Mount Lemmon Survey	MAS · fast	600 m	MPC · JPL
634238	2011 FG_{58}	—	April 26, 2004	Kitt Peak	Spacewatch	·	840 m	MPC · JPL
634239	2011 FT_{65}	—	April 12, 2004	Kitt Peak	Spacewatch	·	990 m	MPC · JPL
634240	2011 FL_{67}	—	March 27, 2011	Mount Lemmon	Mount Lemmon Survey	·	930 m	MPC · JPL
634241	2011 FV_{68}	—	March 27, 2011	Mount Lemmon	Mount Lemmon Survey	·	660 m	MPC · JPL
634242	2011 FX_{68}	—	March 27, 2011	Mount Lemmon	Mount Lemmon Survey	·	620 m	MPC · JPL
634243	2011 FM_{70}	—	March 2, 2011	Mount Lemmon	Mount Lemmon Survey	MAS	550 m	MPC · JPL
634244	2011 FD_{73}	—	April 15, 2004	Palomar	NEAT	·	1.2 km	MPC · JPL
634245	2011 FP_{74}	—	March 14, 2011	Mount Lemmon	Mount Lemmon Survey	VER	2.5 km	MPC · JPL
634246	2011 FA_{78}	—	October 2, 2008	Mount Lemmon	Mount Lemmon Survey	·	2.2 km	MPC · JPL
634247	2011 FN_{78}	—	February 16, 2004	Kitt Peak	Spacewatch	·	780 m	MPC · JPL
634248	2011 FP_{82}	—	March 29, 2011	Mount Lemmon	Mount Lemmon Survey	·	1.5 km	MPC · JPL
634249	2011 FR_{84}	—	September 27, 2009	Mount Lemmon	Mount Lemmon Survey	·	1.2 km	MPC · JPL
634250	2011 FA_{91}	—	April 3, 2000	Kitt Peak	Spacewatch	MAS	630 m	MPC · JPL
634251	2011 FW_{92}	—	March 2, 2006	Kitt Peak	Spacewatch	KOR	1.2 km	MPC · JPL
634252	2011 FQ_{94}	—	March 29, 2011	Mount Lemmon	Mount Lemmon Survey	·	1.3 km	MPC · JPL
634253	2011 FZ_{96}	—	March 29, 2011	Mount Lemmon	Mount Lemmon Survey	·	1.7 km	MPC · JPL
634254	2011 FD_{99}	—	March 30, 2011	Mount Lemmon	Mount Lemmon Survey	·	670 m	MPC · JPL
634255	2011 FF_{102}	—	March 31, 2011	Haleakala	Pan-STARRS 1	V	670 m	MPC · JPL
634256	2011 FV_{102}	—	February 10, 2000	Kitt Peak	Spacewatch	·	1.1 km	MPC · JPL
634257	2011 FT_{106}	—	April 1, 2011	Mount Lemmon	Mount Lemmon Survey	·	2.6 km	MPC · JPL
634258	2011 FP_{108}	—	April 5, 2011	Mount Lemmon	Mount Lemmon Survey	·	2.0 km	MPC · JPL
634259	2011 FV_{108}	—	October 8, 2008	Kitt Peak	Spacewatch	·	2.5 km	MPC · JPL
634260	2011 FK_{112}	—	November 19, 2003	Kitt Peak	Spacewatch	·	2.1 km	MPC · JPL
634261	2011 FR_{112}	—	October 9, 2008	Kitt Peak	Spacewatch	·	1.6 km	MPC · JPL
634262	2011 FH_{117}	—	October 13, 2005	Kitt Peak	Spacewatch	V	610 m	MPC · JPL
634263	2011 FM_{120}	—	April 5, 2003	Kitt Peak	Spacewatch	(5)	1.1 km	MPC · JPL
634264	2011 FF_{126}	—	September 9, 2004	Altschwendt	W. Ries	·	2.3 km	MPC · JPL
634265	2011 FT_{128}	—	April 3, 2000	Kitt Peak	Spacewatch	MAS	680 m	MPC · JPL
634266	2011 FT_{131}	—	August 7, 2008	Kitt Peak	Spacewatch	·	1.0 km	MPC · JPL
634267	2011 FY_{136}	—	October 20, 2003	Kitt Peak	Spacewatch	·	2.5 km	MPC · JPL
634268	2011 FA_{137}	—	October 22, 2009	Mount Lemmon	Mount Lemmon Survey	·	1.2 km	MPC · JPL
634269	2011 FL_{139}	—	December 28, 2005	Kitt Peak	Spacewatch	·	1.2 km	MPC · JPL
634270	2011 FP_{144}	—	September 7, 2008	Mount Lemmon	Mount Lemmon Survey	·	1.4 km	MPC · JPL
634271	2011 FB_{147}	—	February 7, 2007	Mount Lemmon	Mount Lemmon Survey	·	1.6 km	MPC · JPL
634272	2011 FZ_{149}	—	March 26, 2011	Mount Lemmon	Mount Lemmon Survey	·	2.6 km	MPC · JPL
634273	2011 FM_{159}	—	March 28, 2011	Mount Lemmon	Mount Lemmon Survey	·	1.2 km	MPC · JPL
634274	2011 FO_{165}	—	January 11, 2016	Haleakala	Pan-STARRS 1	EOS	1.3 km	MPC · JPL
634275	2011 FH_{172}	—	May 9, 2006	Mount Lemmon	Mount Lemmon Survey	·	2.0 km	MPC · JPL
634276	2011 GA_{1}	—	February 4, 2005	Kitt Peak	Spacewatch	·	3.4 km	MPC · JPL
634277	2011 GK_{2}	—	February 22, 2004	Kitt Peak	Spacewatch	·	740 m	MPC · JPL
634278	2011 GM_{4}	—	August 24, 2008	La Sagra	OAM	·	1.2 km	MPC · JPL
634279	2011 GJ_{8}	—	April 2, 2011	Mount Lemmon	Mount Lemmon Survey	·	1.7 km	MPC · JPL
634280	2011 GD_{18}	—	April 2, 2011	Mount Lemmon	Mount Lemmon Survey	·	1.0 km	MPC · JPL
634281	2011 GB_{20}	—	April 2, 2011	Mount Lemmon	Mount Lemmon Survey	·	1.3 km	MPC · JPL
634282	2011 GK_{22}	—	October 8, 2008	Mount Lemmon	Mount Lemmon Survey	·	1.6 km	MPC · JPL
634283	2011 GK_{25}	—	January 28, 2007	Mount Lemmon	Mount Lemmon Survey	·	1.2 km	MPC · JPL
634284	2011 GG_{28}	—	March 30, 2011	Mount Lemmon	Mount Lemmon Survey	MAS	740 m	MPC · JPL
634285	2011 GR_{30}	—	April 1, 2011	Kitt Peak	Spacewatch	THM	2.1 km	MPC · JPL
634286	2011 GT_{35}	—	March 31, 2004	Kitt Peak	Spacewatch	V	580 m	MPC · JPL
634287	2011 GC_{36}	—	April 3, 2011	Haleakala	Pan-STARRS 1	·	610 m	MPC · JPL
634288	2011 GN_{37}	—	August 31, 2005	Kitt Peak	Spacewatch	·	710 m	MPC · JPL
634289	2011 GJ_{38}	—	October 11, 2004	Kitt Peak	Deep Ecliptic Survey	·	2.3 km	MPC · JPL
634290	2011 GU_{44}	—	October 27, 2005	Uccle	E. W. Elst, H. Debehogne	·	1.4 km	MPC · JPL
634291	2011 GH_{45}	—	February 9, 2005	Kitt Peak	Spacewatch	·	3.5 km	MPC · JPL
634292	2011 GQ_{50}	—	October 23, 2009	Mount Lemmon	Mount Lemmon Survey	·	730 m	MPC · JPL
634293	2011 GM_{51}	—	September 24, 2008	Kitt Peak	Spacewatch	·	1.8 km	MPC · JPL
634294	2011 GT_{53}	—	May 20, 2006	Kitt Peak	Spacewatch	THM	1.8 km	MPC · JPL
634295	2011 GR_{54}	—	March 11, 2011	Kitt Peak	Spacewatch	·	2.0 km	MPC · JPL
634296	2011 GH_{58}	—	February 6, 2007	Kitt Peak	Spacewatch	NYS	1.1 km	MPC · JPL
634297	2011 GJ_{58}	—	February 7, 2003	Palomar	NEAT	·	1.5 km	MPC · JPL
634298	2011 GV_{59}	—	December 15, 2006	Kitt Peak	Spacewatch	NYS	1.1 km	MPC · JPL
634299	2011 GC_{79}	—	March 31, 2005	Vail	Observatory, Jarnac	TIR	2.9 km	MPC · JPL
634300	2011 GC_{80}	—	April 13, 2011	Mount Lemmon	Mount Lemmon Survey	EOS	1.9 km	MPC · JPL

== 634301–634400 ==
back to top

Designation			Discovery			Properties		Ref
Permanent	Provisional	Named after	Date	Site	Discoverer(s)	Category	Diam.	Ref
634301	2011 GV_{81}	—	December 13, 1998	Kitt Peak	Spacewatch	·	1.2 km	MPC · JPL
634302	2011 GZ_{85}	—	April 1, 2011	Mount Lemmon	Mount Lemmon Survey	·	2.0 km	MPC · JPL
634303	2011 GG_{87}	—	April 6, 2011	Mount Lemmon	Mount Lemmon Survey	·	2.3 km	MPC · JPL
634304	2011 GM_{88}	—	April 8, 2011	Catalina	CSS	H	740 m	MPC · JPL
634305	2011 GN_{92}	—	April 5, 2011	Kitt Peak	Spacewatch	·	2.3 km	MPC · JPL
634306	2011 GS_{102}	—	April 3, 2011	Haleakala	Pan-STARRS 1	·	770 m	MPC · JPL
634307	2011 GZ_{103}	—	April 13, 2011	Kitt Peak	Spacewatch	·	2.2 km	MPC · JPL
634308	2011 GJ_{106}	—	April 6, 2011	Mount Lemmon	Mount Lemmon Survey	·	2.4 km	MPC · JPL
634309	2011 GS_{108}	—	April 6, 2011	Mount Lemmon	Mount Lemmon Survey	·	2.2 km	MPC · JPL
634310	2011 HP_{3}	—	April 21, 2011	Haleakala	Pan-STARRS 1	V	560 m	MPC · JPL
634311	2011 HU_{4}	—	April 21, 2011	Haleakala	Pan-STARRS 1	EOS	1.8 km	MPC · JPL
634312	2011 HV_{5}	—	April 23, 2011	Catalina	CSS	·	1.3 km	MPC · JPL
634313	2011 HW_{17}	—	November 26, 2005	Mount Lemmon	Mount Lemmon Survey	MAS	710 m	MPC · JPL
634314	2011 HX_{25}	—	January 15, 2004	Kitt Peak	Spacewatch	(1298)	3.4 km	MPC · JPL
634315	2011 HF_{27}	—	November 23, 2006	Mount Lemmon	Mount Lemmon Survey	·	1.1 km	MPC · JPL
634316	2011 HW_{34}	—	April 29, 2011	Kitt Peak	Spacewatch	·	3.0 km	MPC · JPL
634317	2011 HR_{37}	—	March 10, 2007	Mount Lemmon	Mount Lemmon Survey	·	980 m	MPC · JPL
634318	2011 HM_{62}	—	April 28, 2011	Mount Lemmon	Mount Lemmon Survey	HNS	1.2 km	MPC · JPL
634319	2011 HQ_{67}	—	April 6, 2011	Kitt Peak	Spacewatch	V	650 m	MPC · JPL
634320	2011 HB_{71}	—	August 25, 2003	Cerro Tololo	Deep Ecliptic Survey	·	2.0 km	MPC · JPL
634321	2011 HF_{75}	—	February 7, 2007	Mount Lemmon	Mount Lemmon Survey	·	920 m	MPC · JPL
634322	2011 HZ_{76}	—	March 12, 2007	Catalina	CSS	·	1.3 km	MPC · JPL
634323	2011 HO_{81}	—	November 1, 2005	Kitt Peak	Spacewatch	·	1.6 km	MPC · JPL
634324	2011 HY_{83}	—	April 27, 2011	Mount Lemmon	Mount Lemmon Survey	·	740 m	MPC · JPL
634325	2011 HX_{92}	—	January 9, 2006	Kitt Peak	Spacewatch	·	1.2 km	MPC · JPL
634326	2011 HO_{94}	—	October 7, 2008	Mount Lemmon	Mount Lemmon Survey	·	2.5 km	MPC · JPL
634327	2011 HU_{94}	—	April 27, 2011	Kitt Peak	Spacewatch	·	1.1 km	MPC · JPL
634328	2011 HP_{97}	—	September 11, 2007	Mount Lemmon	Mount Lemmon Survey	·	3.0 km	MPC · JPL
634329	2011 HK_{99}	—	April 30, 2011	Haleakala	Pan-STARRS 1	V	710 m	MPC · JPL
634330	2011 HN_{103}	—	August 26, 2001	Palomar	NEAT	·	4.0 km	MPC · JPL
634331	2011 JG	—	May 1, 2011	Atacama	IAA-AI	·	1.0 km	MPC · JPL
634332	2011 JT_{1}	—	June 2, 2003	Kitt Peak	Spacewatch	H	580 m	MPC · JPL
634333	2011 JW_{4}	—	December 26, 2008	Bergisch Gladbach	W. Bickel	·	1.9 km	MPC · JPL
634334	2011 JA_{5}	—	May 23, 2001	Cerro Tololo	Deep Ecliptic Survey	·	2.3 km	MPC · JPL
634335	2011 JX_{22}	—	May 1, 2011	Haleakala	Pan-STARRS 1	EOS	1.8 km	MPC · JPL
634336	2011 JA_{25}	—	April 13, 2011	Mount Lemmon	Mount Lemmon Survey	·	2.2 km	MPC · JPL
634337	2011 JK_{26}	—	November 2, 2002	La Palma	A. Fitzsimmons	·	2.5 km	MPC · JPL
634338	2011 JW_{27}	—	June 22, 2006	Kitt Peak	Spacewatch	·	2.9 km	MPC · JPL
634339	2011 JL_{28}	—	May 13, 2011	Mount Lemmon	Mount Lemmon Survey	·	1.8 km	MPC · JPL
634340	2011 JD_{29}	—	July 30, 2003	Campo Imperatore	CINEOS	(5)	1.8 km	MPC · JPL
634341	2011 JG_{32}	—	May 3, 2011	Mayhill-ISON	L. Elenin	·	1.1 km	MPC · JPL
634342	2011 JX_{32}	—	May 1, 2011	Mount Lemmon	Mount Lemmon Survey	V	730 m	MPC · JPL
634343	2011 JD_{39}	—	May 8, 2011	Mount Lemmon	Mount Lemmon Survey	KOR	1.2 km	MPC · JPL
634344	2011 KN_{1}	—	May 21, 2011	Mount Lemmon	Mount Lemmon Survey	EOS	1.9 km	MPC · JPL
634345	2011 KH_{3}	—	March 13, 2007	Mount Lemmon	Mount Lemmon Survey	V	630 m	MPC · JPL
634346	2011 KL_{10}	—	October 16, 2001	Kitt Peak	Spacewatch	THM	2.4 km	MPC · JPL
634347	2011 KS_{21}	—	May 31, 2011	Mount Lemmon	Mount Lemmon Survey	L5	9.3 km	MPC · JPL
634348	2011 KQ_{22}	—	May 31, 2011	Mount Lemmon	Mount Lemmon Survey	·	2.9 km	MPC · JPL
634349	2011 KX_{30}	—	May 23, 2011	Mount Lemmon	Mount Lemmon Survey	·	1.1 km	MPC · JPL
634350	2011 KO_{39}	—	February 21, 2007	Kitt Peak	Spacewatch	·	760 m	MPC · JPL
634351	2011 KZ_{41}	—	May 24, 2011	Haleakala	Pan-STARRS 1	·	2.0 km	MPC · JPL
634352	2011 KY_{44}	—	November 25, 2009	Kitt Peak	Spacewatch	·	970 m	MPC · JPL
634353	2011 KF_{46}	—	May 30, 2011	Haleakala	Pan-STARRS 1	NYS	1.1 km	MPC · JPL
634354	2011 KQ_{48}	—	April 6, 2011	Mount Lemmon	Mount Lemmon Survey	·	2.9 km	MPC · JPL
634355	2011 KF_{54}	—	April 1, 2016	Haleakala	Pan-STARRS 1	EOS	1.8 km	MPC · JPL
634356	2011 KN_{57}	—	May 28, 2011	Mount Lemmon	Mount Lemmon Survey	·	2.1 km	MPC · JPL
634357	2011 KT_{57}	—	May 22, 2011	Mount Lemmon	Mount Lemmon Survey	·	1.8 km	MPC · JPL
634358	2011 KW_{59}	—	May 24, 2011	Haleakala	Pan-STARRS 1	·	2.4 km	MPC · JPL
634359	2011 LQ	—	September 23, 2008	Kitt Peak	Spacewatch	·	1.2 km	MPC · JPL
634360	2011 LU	—	May 23, 2011	Nogales	M. Schwartz, P. R. Holvorcem	RAF	1.1 km	MPC · JPL
634361	2011 LY_{5}	—	October 2, 2008	Kitt Peak	Spacewatch	NYS	1.3 km	MPC · JPL
634362	2011 LG_{7}	—	April 2, 2006	Anderson Mesa	LONEOS	·	2.5 km	MPC · JPL
634363	2011 LS_{7}	—	June 5, 2011	Kitt Peak	Spacewatch	·	1.1 km	MPC · JPL
634364	2011 LS_{15}	—	March 18, 2005	Siding Spring	SSS	·	3.5 km	MPC · JPL
634365	2011 LX_{17}	—	April 29, 2011	Mount Lemmon	Mount Lemmon Survey	·	2.8 km	MPC · JPL
634366	2011 LE_{19}	—	June 9, 2011	Mount Lemmon	Mount Lemmon Survey	·	1.4 km	MPC · JPL
634367	2011 LB_{28}	—	March 24, 2003	Kitt Peak	Spacewatch	·	1.2 km	MPC · JPL
634368	2011 LQ_{35}	—	June 10, 2011	Mount Lemmon	Mount Lemmon Survey	·	2.7 km	MPC · JPL
634369	2011 NV_{1}	—	July 5, 2011	Haleakala	Haleakala	·	1.9 km	MPC · JPL
634370	2011 OV_{2}	—	July 23, 2011	Haleakala	Pan-STARRS 1	·	2.3 km	MPC · JPL
634371	2011 OP_{3}	—	July 22, 2011	Haleakala	Pan-STARRS 1	L5	9.2 km	MPC · JPL
634372	2011 OZ_{10}	—	January 29, 2009	Dauban	C. Rinner, F. Kugel	EOS	2.0 km	MPC · JPL
634373	2011 OJ_{15}	—	May 5, 2002	Palomar	NEAT	MAR	1.4 km	MPC · JPL
634374	2011 OL_{16}	—	July 26, 2011	Haleakala	Pan-STARRS 1	·	2.9 km	MPC · JPL
634375	2011 OK_{17}	—	July 1, 2011	Siding Spring	SSS	PHO	1.5 km	MPC · JPL
634376	2011 OP_{31}	—	December 3, 2008	Mount Lemmon	Mount Lemmon Survey	·	1.9 km	MPC · JPL
634377	2011 OV_{34}	—	July 25, 2006	Mount Lemmon	Mount Lemmon Survey	·	2.8 km	MPC · JPL
634378	2011 OQ_{43}	—	February 3, 2009	Mount Lemmon	Mount Lemmon Survey	·	3.1 km	MPC · JPL
634379	2011 OG_{48}	—	March 2, 2006	Kitt Peak	Wasserman, L. H., Millis, R. L.	·	1.0 km	MPC · JPL
634380	2011 OH_{60}	—	October 10, 2012	Haleakala	Pan-STARRS 1	L5	6.7 km	MPC · JPL
634381	2011 OY_{60}	—	July 27, 2011	Haleakala	Pan-STARRS 1	L5	7.4 km	MPC · JPL
634382	2011 OZ_{65}	—	November 12, 2001	Apache Point	SDSS Collaboration	·	2.4 km	MPC · JPL
634383	2011 OG_{68}	—	October 3, 2013	Haleakala	Pan-STARRS 1	L5	5.9 km	MPC · JPL
634384	2011 OA_{72}	—	July 28, 2011	Haleakala	Pan-STARRS 1	·	2.0 km	MPC · JPL
634385	2011 OQ_{73}	—	July 27, 2011	Haleakala	Pan-STARRS 1	L5	6.9 km	MPC · JPL
634386	2011 OS_{73}	—	July 25, 2011	Haleakala	Pan-STARRS 1	·	2.2 km	MPC · JPL
634387	2011 OT_{73}	—	July 27, 2011	Haleakala	Pan-STARRS 1	VER	2.2 km	MPC · JPL
634388	2011 PQ_{6}	—	September 27, 2006	Kitt Peak	Spacewatch	·	2.4 km	MPC · JPL
634389	2011 PT_{7}	—	December 4, 2008	Mount Lemmon	Mount Lemmon Survey	·	830 m	MPC · JPL
634390	2011 PQ_{13}	—	August 4, 2011	Haleakala	Pan-STARRS 1	·	1.1 km	MPC · JPL
634391	2011 PF_{14}	—	September 25, 2006	Mount Lemmon	Mount Lemmon Survey	·	2.4 km	MPC · JPL
634392	2011 PE_{17}	—	October 25, 2013	Mount Lemmon	Mount Lemmon Survey	L5	7.7 km	MPC · JPL
634393	2011 PH_{20}	—	January 4, 2016	Haleakala	Pan-STARRS 1	L5	6.2 km	MPC · JPL
634394	2011 QD_{1}	—	August 19, 2011	Haleakala	Pan-STARRS 1	L5	6.4 km	MPC · JPL
634395	2011 QM_{2}	—	August 20, 2011	Great Shefford	Birtwhistle, P.	·	1.5 km	MPC · JPL
634396	2011 QY_{7}	—	September 16, 2006	Catalina	CSS	·	3.1 km	MPC · JPL
634397	2011 QJ_{13}	—	June 30, 2011	Mayhill-ISON	L. Elenin	·	2.0 km	MPC · JPL
634398	2011 QM_{18}	—	August 21, 2011	Dauban	C. Rinner, Kugel, F.	·	3.1 km	MPC · JPL
634399	2011 QU_{20}	—	August 23, 2011	Haleakala	Pan-STARRS 1	·	2.3 km	MPC · JPL
634400	2011 QK_{38}	—	August 24, 2011	Haleakala	Pan-STARRS 1	L5	7.9 km	MPC · JPL

== 634401–634500 ==
back to top

Designation			Discovery			Properties		Ref
Permanent	Provisional	Named after	Date	Site	Discoverer(s)	Category	Diam.	Ref
634401	2011 QJ_{41}	—	November 19, 2008	Mount Lemmon	Mount Lemmon Survey	NYS	1.3 km	MPC · JPL
634402	2011 QS_{41}	—	September 26, 2000	Kitt Peak	Spacewatch	·	960 m	MPC · JPL
634403	2011 QP_{45}	—	August 28, 2011	Ka-Dar	Gerke, V.	·	1.0 km	MPC · JPL
634404	2011 QA_{55}	—	September 23, 2003	Palomar	NEAT	·	1.0 km	MPC · JPL
634405	2011 QB_{55}	—	August 26, 2011	Piszkéstető	K. Sárneczky	·	2.8 km	MPC · JPL
634406	2011 QS_{57}	—	July 29, 2011	Mayhill	L. Elenin	·	1.4 km	MPC · JPL
634407	2011 QA_{58}	—	October 2, 2006	Mount Lemmon	Mount Lemmon Survey	LIX	3.2 km	MPC · JPL
634408	2011 QC_{64}	—	September 20, 2003	Kitt Peak	Spacewatch	·	1.1 km	MPC · JPL
634409	2011 QH_{74}	—	November 7, 2005	Mauna Kea	A. Boattini	NYS	1.3 km	MPC · JPL
634410	2011 QO_{79}	—	August 23, 2011	Haleakala	Pan-STARRS 1	NYS	1.1 km	MPC · JPL
634411	2011 QH_{84}	—	September 19, 2006	Kitt Peak	Spacewatch	·	3.4 km	MPC · JPL
634412	2011 QO_{84}	—	August 24, 2011	Haleakala	Pan-STARRS 1	·	2.2 km	MPC · JPL
634413	2011 QR_{87}	—	August 27, 2011	Mayhill-ISON	L. Elenin	·	1.3 km	MPC · JPL
634414	2011 QQ_{88}	—	August 27, 2011	Haleakala	Pan-STARRS 1	·	1.1 km	MPC · JPL
634415	2011 QA_{90}	—	August 29, 2011	Mayhill	L. Elenin	·	3.9 km	MPC · JPL
634416	2011 QM_{105}	—	December 8, 2012	Mount Lemmon	Mount Lemmon Survey	·	2.3 km	MPC · JPL
634417	2011 QU_{113}	—	August 23, 2011	Haleakala	Pan-STARRS 1	·	3.2 km	MPC · JPL
634418	2011 RW_{6}	—	September 5, 2011	Haleakala	Pan-STARRS 1	L5	7.0 km	MPC · JPL
634419	2011 RG_{11}	—	March 1, 2009	Mount Lemmon	Mount Lemmon Survey	·	1.3 km	MPC · JPL
634420	2011 RQ_{20}	—	October 21, 2003	Kitt Peak	Spacewatch	·	940 m	MPC · JPL
634421	2011 RP_{27}	—	September 4, 2011	Andrushivka	Y. Ivaščenko, Kyrylenko, P.	·	3.0 km	MPC · JPL
634422	2011 RQ_{27}	—	September 4, 2011	Kitt Peak	Spacewatch	·	2.4 km	MPC · JPL
634423	2011 RV_{33}	—	September 4, 2011	Haleakala	Pan-STARRS 1	·	2.6 km	MPC · JPL
634424	2011 RM_{34}	—	September 3, 2011	Charleston	R. Holmes	·	2.7 km	MPC · JPL
634425	2011 SX_{1}	—	October 11, 1999	Kitt Peak	Spacewatch	·	1.1 km	MPC · JPL
634426	2011 SQ_{8}	—	October 7, 2004	Kitt Peak	Spacewatch	NYS	880 m	MPC · JPL
634427	2011 SN_{19}	—	May 19, 2010	Mount Lemmon	Mount Lemmon Survey	·	1.2 km	MPC · JPL
634428	2011 ST_{21}	—	September 20, 2011	Haleakala	Pan-STARRS 1	L5	10 km	MPC · JPL
634429	2011 SX_{25}	—	September 19, 2011	Ka-Dar	Gerke, V.	·	3.1 km	MPC · JPL
634430	2011 SS_{27}	—	September 3, 2002	Palomar	NEAT	·	2.5 km	MPC · JPL
634431	2011 SH_{34}	—	March 12, 2005	Kitt Peak	Spacewatch	·	1.5 km	MPC · JPL
634432	2011 SW_{34}	—	March 31, 2009	Mount Lemmon	Mount Lemmon Survey	·	3.4 km	MPC · JPL
634433	2011 SJ_{37}	—	October 14, 2007	Mount Lemmon	Mount Lemmon Survey	·	1.2 km	MPC · JPL
634434	2011 SO_{39}	—	September 20, 2011	Haleakala	Pan-STARRS 1	·	3.1 km	MPC · JPL
634435	2011 ST_{40}	—	September 21, 2011	Mount Lemmon	Mount Lemmon Survey	·	1.4 km	MPC · JPL
634436	2011 SE_{41}	—	September 13, 2007	Kitt Peak	Spacewatch	·	900 m	MPC · JPL
634437	2011 SL_{41}	—	March 25, 2003	Mauna Kea	B. J. Gladman, J. J. Kavelaars	·	2.6 km	MPC · JPL
634438	2011 SJ_{48}	—	October 12, 2006	Kitt Peak	Spacewatch	·	3.1 km	MPC · JPL
634439	2011 SX_{58}	—	March 8, 2003	Kitt Peak	Spacewatch	URS	2.9 km	MPC · JPL
634440	2011 SU_{59}	—	September 18, 2011	Mount Lemmon	Mount Lemmon Survey	·	2.7 km	MPC · JPL
634441	2011 SH_{60}	—	October 16, 2006	Kitt Peak	Spacewatch	·	2.5 km	MPC · JPL
634442	2011 SY_{61}	—	September 18, 2011	Mount Lemmon	Mount Lemmon Survey	·	870 m	MPC · JPL
634443	2011 SP_{63}	—	November 25, 2006	Kitt Peak	Spacewatch	·	2.7 km	MPC · JPL
634444	2011 SW_{64}	—	September 23, 2011	Haleakala	Pan-STARRS 1	·	2.7 km	MPC · JPL
634445	2011 SR_{71}	—	September 24, 2011	Haleakala	Pan-STARRS 1	L5	10 km	MPC · JPL
634446	2011 ST_{73}	—	October 16, 2007	Mount Lemmon	Mount Lemmon Survey	(5)	1.4 km	MPC · JPL
634447	2011 SB_{79}	—	November 5, 2002	Palomar	NEAT	AGN	1.2 km	MPC · JPL
634448	2011 SD_{81}	—	September 26, 2003	Apache Point	SDSS Collaboration	·	760 m	MPC · JPL
634449	2011 SC_{101}	—	May 1, 2006	Kitt Peak	Spacewatch	·	1 km	MPC · JPL
634450	2011 SZ_{101}	—	September 24, 2011	Mount Lemmon	Mount Lemmon Survey	·	2.4 km	MPC · JPL
634451	2011 ST_{110}	—	September 26, 2007	Mount Lemmon	Mount Lemmon Survey	·	2.0 km	MPC · JPL
634452	2011 SC_{114}	—	August 28, 2011	Siding Spring	SSS	LIX	3.4 km	MPC · JPL
634453	2011 SV_{114}	—	October 3, 2002	Palomar	NEAT	·	2.6 km	MPC · JPL
634454	2011 SW_{116}	—	October 16, 2007	Mount Lemmon	Mount Lemmon Survey	AGN	1.2 km	MPC · JPL
634455	2011 SH_{121}	—	September 18, 2011	Mount Lemmon	Mount Lemmon Survey	THM	2.1 km	MPC · JPL
634456	2011 SB_{154}	—	September 4, 2011	Haleakala	Pan-STARRS 1	VER	2.2 km	MPC · JPL
634457	2011 SX_{154}	—	March 28, 2009	Mount Lemmon	Mount Lemmon Survey	AGN	1.2 km	MPC · JPL
634458	2011 SQ_{155}	—	October 8, 2007	Mount Lemmon	Mount Lemmon Survey	·	840 m	MPC · JPL
634459	2011 SM_{159}	—	June 9, 2010	Nogales	M. Schwartz, P. R. Holvorcem	·	1.8 km	MPC · JPL
634460	2011 SF_{177}	—	September 7, 2011	Kitt Peak	Spacewatch	·	2.7 km	MPC · JPL
634461	2011 SR_{190}	—	September 29, 2011	Mount Lemmon	Mount Lemmon Survey	·	1.1 km	MPC · JPL
634462	2011 SE_{201}	—	September 11, 2007	Kitt Peak	Spacewatch	·	940 m	MPC · JPL
634463	2011 SZ_{204}	—	September 20, 2011	Mount Lemmon	Mount Lemmon Survey	·	2.5 km	MPC · JPL
634464	2011 SU_{227}	—	October 12, 2007	Mount Lemmon	Mount Lemmon Survey	·	960 m	MPC · JPL
634465	2011 SP_{232}	—	September 30, 2011	Great Shefford	Birtwhistle, P.	fast	2.3 km	MPC · JPL
634466	2011 SF_{240}	—	September 26, 2011	Mount Lemmon	Mount Lemmon Survey	·	750 m	MPC · JPL
634467	2011 SB_{247}	—	September 29, 2011	Mount Lemmon	Mount Lemmon Survey	·	1.9 km	MPC · JPL
634468	2011 SA_{250}	—	June 28, 2011	Mount Lemmon	Mount Lemmon Survey	·	3.9 km	MPC · JPL
634469	2011 SX_{252}	—	September 7, 2011	Kitt Peak	Spacewatch	·	3.4 km	MPC · JPL
634470	2011 SH_{260}	—	September 29, 2011	Mount Lemmon	Mount Lemmon Survey	EUN	1.2 km	MPC · JPL
634471	2011 SB_{263}	—	October 8, 2007	Kitt Peak	Spacewatch	·	1.5 km	MPC · JPL
634472	2011 SA_{272}	—	September 21, 2011	Haleakala	Pan-STARRS 1	·	2.4 km	MPC · JPL
634473	2011 SO_{272}	—	March 16, 2004	Kitt Peak	Spacewatch	TIR	3.5 km	MPC · JPL
634474	2011 SE_{275}	—	September 20, 2011	Kitt Peak	Spacewatch	MAS	840 m	MPC · JPL
634475	2011 SP_{277}	—	November 2, 2010	Kitt Peak	Spacewatch	L4	8.6 km	MPC · JPL
634476	2011 SQ_{279}	—	September 29, 2000	Kitt Peak	Spacewatch	·	1.9 km	MPC · JPL
634477	2011 SA_{282}	—	September 25, 2011	Haleakala	Pan-STARRS 1	·	3.3 km	MPC · JPL
634478	2011 SS_{282}	—	August 31, 2005	Kitt Peak	Spacewatch	·	2.8 km	MPC · JPL
634479	2011 SW_{282}	—	October 20, 2012	Mount Lemmon	Mount Lemmon Survey	·	2.4 km	MPC · JPL
634480	2011 SP_{283}	—	September 20, 2011	Haleakala	Pan-STARRS 1	L5	7.2 km	MPC · JPL
634481	2011 SM_{284}	—	September 24, 2011	Haleakala	Pan-STARRS 1	T_{j} (2.99) · EUP	3.5 km	MPC · JPL
634482	2011 SY_{284}	—	October 26, 2013	Mount Lemmon	Mount Lemmon Survey	L5	9.7 km	MPC · JPL
634483	2011 SC_{295}	—	October 9, 2012	Mount Lemmon	Mount Lemmon Survey	L5	7.8 km	MPC · JPL
634484	2011 SK_{295}	—	September 24, 2011	Mount Lemmon	Mount Lemmon Survey	·	790 m	MPC · JPL
634485	2011 SL_{296}	—	September 30, 2017	Haleakala	Pan-STARRS 1	·	2.4 km	MPC · JPL
634486	2011 SJ_{304}	—	September 24, 2011	Haleakala	Pan-STARRS 1	·	3.3 km	MPC · JPL
634487	2011 SX_{306}	—	September 26, 2011	Haleakala	Pan-STARRS 1	·	2.3 km	MPC · JPL
634488	2011 SB_{307}	—	September 18, 2011	Mount Lemmon	Mount Lemmon Survey	THM	1.6 km	MPC · JPL
634489	2011 SE_{308}	—	September 23, 2011	Haleakala	Pan-STARRS 1	VER	2.5 km	MPC · JPL
634490	2011 SJ_{308}	—	September 27, 2011	Mount Lemmon	Mount Lemmon Survey	·	2.7 km	MPC · JPL
634491	2011 SZ_{309}	—	September 19, 2011	Haleakala	Pan-STARRS 1	EOS	1.8 km	MPC · JPL
634492	2011 SU_{323}	—	September 18, 2011	Mount Lemmon	Mount Lemmon Survey	·	2.5 km	MPC · JPL
634493	2011 SJ_{328}	—	January 26, 2015	Haleakala	Pan-STARRS 1	·	2.7 km	MPC · JPL
634494	2011 SU_{329}	—	September 21, 2011	Mount Lemmon	Mount Lemmon Survey	·	1.2 km	MPC · JPL
634495	2011 SV_{332}	—	September 24, 2011	Mount Lemmon	Mount Lemmon Survey	·	2.3 km	MPC · JPL
634496	2011 SL_{340}	—	September 23, 2011	Kitt Peak	Spacewatch	·	830 m	MPC · JPL
634497	2011 SL_{346}	—	September 19, 2011	Haleakala	Pan-STARRS 1	·	2.6 km	MPC · JPL
634498	2011 SS_{349}	—	February 3, 2008	Kitt Peak	Spacewatch	·	2.5 km	MPC · JPL
634499	2011 SW_{355}	—	September 26, 2011	Haleakala	Pan-STARRS 1	·	2.4 km	MPC · JPL
634500	2011 TV_{1}	—	August 29, 2011	Piszkéstető	K. Sárneczky	·	3.2 km	MPC · JPL

== 634501–634600 ==
back to top

Designation			Discovery			Properties		Ref
Permanent	Provisional	Named after	Date	Site	Discoverer(s)	Category	Diam.	Ref
634501	2011 TA_{8}	—	February 9, 2008	Mount Lemmon	Mount Lemmon Survey	·	2.4 km	MPC · JPL
634502	2011 TA_{24}	—	October 1, 2011	Kitt Peak	Spacewatch	·	2.7 km	MPC · JPL
634503	2011 UK_{3}	—	September 26, 2000	Haleakala	NEAT	·	3.3 km	MPC · JPL
634504	2011 UB_{20}	—	December 17, 2007	Lulin	LUSS	·	1.3 km	MPC · JPL
634505	2011 UO_{27}	—	October 17, 2011	Kitt Peak	Spacewatch	·	1.2 km	MPC · JPL
634506	2011 UM_{28}	—	March 28, 2003	Anderson Mesa	LONEOS	·	990 m	MPC · JPL
634507	2011 US_{28}	—	August 8, 2011	Mayhill-ISON	L. Elenin	·	1.7 km	MPC · JPL
634508	2011 UM_{32}	—	September 24, 2011	Mayhill-ISON	L. Elenin	·	3.2 km	MPC · JPL
634509	2011 US_{33}	—	October 19, 2011	Mayhill-ISON	L. Elenin	(895)	3.8 km	MPC · JPL
634510	2011 UW_{38}	—	October 22, 2006	Kitt Peak	Spacewatch	KOR	1.4 km	MPC · JPL
634511	2011 UQ_{62}	—	October 19, 2011	Haleakala	Pan-STARRS 1	centaur	60 km	MPC · JPL
634512	2011 UE_{68}	—	October 3, 2000	Socorro	LINEAR	·	1.1 km	MPC · JPL
634513	2011 US_{71}	—	January 27, 2004	Kitt Peak	Spacewatch	·	1.8 km	MPC · JPL
634514	2011 UP_{111}	—	February 24, 2001	Haleakala	NEAT	·	1.6 km	MPC · JPL
634515	2011 UH_{114}	—	August 17, 2002	Palomar	NEAT	·	1.1 km	MPC · JPL
634516	2011 UV_{116}	—	October 16, 2011	Kitt Peak	Spacewatch	·	2.1 km	MPC · JPL
634517	2011 UP_{120}	—	August 30, 2005	Kitt Peak	Spacewatch	·	2.7 km	MPC · JPL
634518	2011 US_{128}	—	August 27, 2006	Kitt Peak	Spacewatch	·	2.0 km	MPC · JPL
634519	2011 UQ_{129}	—	October 21, 2011	Mount Lemmon	Mount Lemmon Survey	·	1.2 km	MPC · JPL
634520	2011 UB_{130}	—	July 12, 2005	Mount Lemmon	Mount Lemmon Survey	THM	2.7 km	MPC · JPL
634521	2011 UM_{135}	—	March 23, 2003	Kitt Peak	Spacewatch	·	2.8 km	MPC · JPL
634522	2011 UR_{137}	—	March 11, 2003	Palomar	NEAT	·	2.1 km	MPC · JPL
634523	2011 UG_{148}	—	November 24, 2003	Kitt Peak	Spacewatch	·	1.1 km	MPC · JPL
634524	2011 UQ_{158}	—	October 25, 2011	Haleakala	Pan-STARRS 1	·	1.7 km	MPC · JPL
634525	2011 UP_{167}	—	September 21, 2011	Kitt Peak	Spacewatch	·	2.6 km	MPC · JPL
634526	2011 UV_{179}	—	June 29, 2005	Kitt Peak	Spacewatch	·	2.8 km	MPC · JPL
634527	2011 UB_{182}	—	February 20, 2009	Calar Alto	F. Hormuth	(5)	1.5 km	MPC · JPL
634528	2011 UM_{188}	—	August 27, 2005	Palomar	NEAT	·	3.3 km	MPC · JPL
634529	2011 UX_{188}	—	March 8, 2003	Kitt Peak	Spacewatch	·	3.4 km	MPC · JPL
634530	2011 UK_{190}	—	October 8, 2002	Palomar	NEAT	·	2.6 km	MPC · JPL
634531	2011 UM_{193}	—	August 25, 2005	Palomar	NEAT	·	3.8 km	MPC · JPL
634532	2011 US_{194}	—	March 26, 2001	Kitt Peak	Deep Ecliptic Survey	(5)	1.1 km	MPC · JPL
634533	2011 UM_{195}	—	October 24, 2011	Haleakala	Pan-STARRS 1	EUN	1.2 km	MPC · JPL
634534	2011 US_{207}	—	October 24, 2011	Mount Lemmon	Mount Lemmon Survey	·	1.2 km	MPC · JPL
634535	2011 UN_{209}	—	December 6, 2007	Kitt Peak	Spacewatch	·	2.2 km	MPC · JPL
634536	2011 UA_{229}	—	September 21, 2011	Kitt Peak	Spacewatch	·	910 m	MPC · JPL
634537	2011 UG_{250}	—	October 22, 2011	Kitt Peak	Spacewatch	·	1.6 km	MPC · JPL
634538	2011 UY_{286}	—	August 19, 2006	Kitt Peak	Spacewatch	NEM	2.1 km	MPC · JPL
634539 Kuvaev	2011 UQ_{289}	Kuvaev	October 28, 2011	Zelenchukskaya Stn	T. V. Krjačko, Satovski, B.	·	1.4 km	MPC · JPL
634540	2011 UP_{290}	—	September 30, 2005	Mauna Kea	A. Boattini	·	780 m	MPC · JPL
634541	2011 UU_{294}	—	January 17, 2004	Palomar	NEAT	·	2.1 km	MPC · JPL
634542	2011 UC_{316}	—	April 23, 2009	Mount Lemmon	Mount Lemmon Survey	·	1.7 km	MPC · JPL
634543	2011 UD_{334}	—	April 15, 2008	Mount Lemmon	Mount Lemmon Survey	·	2.9 km	MPC · JPL
634544	2011 UO_{340}	—	September 23, 2005	Kitt Peak	Spacewatch	·	3.1 km	MPC · JPL
634545	2011 UB_{344}	—	December 21, 2007	Mount Lemmon	Mount Lemmon Survey	·	2.2 km	MPC · JPL
634546	2011 UM_{344}	—	October 19, 2011	Kitt Peak	Spacewatch	·	1.3 km	MPC · JPL
634547	2011 UC_{370}	—	October 23, 2011	Kitt Peak	Spacewatch	VER	2.7 km	MPC · JPL
634548	2011 UP_{373}	—	September 28, 2011	Kitt Peak	Spacewatch	·	3.1 km	MPC · JPL
634549	2011 UA_{376}	—	February 3, 2005	Épendes	P. Kocher	·	1.1 km	MPC · JPL
634550	2011 UN_{378}	—	October 23, 2011	Mount Lemmon	Mount Lemmon Survey	·	1.1 km	MPC · JPL
634551	2011 UC_{394}	—	October 28, 2011	Mount Lemmon	Mount Lemmon Survey	·	1.3 km	MPC · JPL
634552	2011 UQ_{394}	—	October 3, 2011	Piszkéstető	K. Sárneczky	·	3.7 km	MPC · JPL
634553	2011 UN_{396}	—	April 15, 2010	Kitt Peak	Spacewatch	·	1.7 km	MPC · JPL
634554	2011 UC_{403}	—	November 18, 2006	Mount Lemmon	Mount Lemmon Survey	·	3.0 km	MPC · JPL
634555	2011 UY_{413}	—	October 24, 2011	Haleakala	Pan-STARRS 1	·	1.3 km	MPC · JPL
634556	2011 UZ_{413}	—	December 5, 2007	Kitt Peak	Spacewatch	·	1.8 km	MPC · JPL
634557	2011 UC_{414}	—	January 27, 2004	Kitt Peak	Spacewatch	·	1.0 km	MPC · JPL
634558	2011 UD_{416}	—	October 24, 2011	Kitt Peak	Spacewatch	·	1.2 km	MPC · JPL
634559 Drayer	2011 UD_{420}	Drayer	October 27, 2011	Zelenchukskaya Stn	T. V. Krjačko, Satovski, B.	·	2.7 km	MPC · JPL
634560	2011 UO_{420}	—	October 5, 2016	Mount Lemmon	Mount Lemmon Survey	·	1.9 km	MPC · JPL
634561	2011 UR_{433}	—	November 21, 2006	Mount Lemmon	Mount Lemmon Survey	·	2.9 km	MPC · JPL
634562	2011 UF_{434}	—	January 10, 2013	Haleakala	Pan-STARRS 1	·	1.3 km	MPC · JPL
634563	2011 VA_{18}	—	March 19, 2009	Kitt Peak	Spacewatch	·	1.8 km	MPC · JPL
634564	2011 VZ_{21}	—	October 20, 2011	Mount Lemmon	Mount Lemmon Survey	·	1.3 km	MPC · JPL
634565	2011 WA_{24}	—	October 26, 2011	Haleakala	Pan-STARRS 1	L4	5.8 km	MPC · JPL
634566	2011 WF_{25}	—	October 18, 2011	Mount Lemmon	Mount Lemmon Survey	·	1.6 km	MPC · JPL
634567	2011 WU_{29}	—	October 2, 2006	Mount Lemmon	Mount Lemmon Survey	AGN	1.2 km	MPC · JPL
634568	2011 WD_{41}	—	November 24, 2011	Haleakala	Pan-STARRS 1	·	1.1 km	MPC · JPL
634569	2011 WO_{44}	—	September 25, 1998	Kitt Peak	Spacewatch	·	1.2 km	MPC · JPL
634570	2011 WK_{46}	—	November 26, 2011	Haleakala	Pan-STARRS 1	L4	9.2 km	MPC · JPL
634571	2011 WL_{53}	—	October 27, 2006	Kitt Peak	Spacewatch	·	3.4 km	MPC · JPL
634572	2011 WB_{60}	—	October 26, 2011	Haleakala	Pan-STARRS 1	·	870 m	MPC · JPL
634573	2011 WC_{62}	—	November 3, 2011	Kitt Peak	Spacewatch	·	1.8 km	MPC · JPL
634574	2011 WL_{67}	—	September 3, 2005	Mauna Kea	Veillet, C.	·	2.0 km	MPC · JPL
634575	2011 WN_{75}	—	June 8, 2002	Socorro	LINEAR	·	1.3 km	MPC · JPL
634576	2011 WM_{86}	—	November 22, 2011	Mount Lemmon	Mount Lemmon Survey	·	1.2 km	MPC · JPL
634577	2011 WN_{108}	—	October 26, 2011	Haleakala	Pan-STARRS 1	·	1.6 km	MPC · JPL
634578	2011 WG_{133}	—	December 22, 2003	Kitt Peak	Spacewatch	·	2.1 km	MPC · JPL
634579	2011 WU_{135}	—	October 12, 2006	Palomar	NEAT	·	2.2 km	MPC · JPL
634580	2011 WB_{137}	—	November 16, 2011	Mount Lemmon	Mount Lemmon Survey	·	1.3 km	MPC · JPL
634581	2011 WK_{142}	—	December 3, 2007	Kitt Peak	Spacewatch	·	1.2 km	MPC · JPL
634582	2011 WO_{157}	—	November 3, 2011	Kitt Peak	Spacewatch	·	980 m	MPC · JPL
634583	2011 WF_{184}	—	November 25, 2011	Haleakala	Pan-STARRS 1	L4	6.4 km	MPC · JPL
634584	2011 YT	—	August 19, 2006	Palomar	NEAT	·	2.6 km	MPC · JPL
634585	2011 YV_{5}	—	September 17, 2009	Kitt Peak	Spacewatch	L4	6.8 km	MPC · JPL
634586	2011 YB_{28}	—	February 9, 2008	Mount Lemmon	Mount Lemmon Survey	·	1.9 km	MPC · JPL
634587	2011 YK_{32}	—	October 14, 2010	Mount Lemmon	Mount Lemmon Survey	L4	7.1 km	MPC · JPL
634588	2011 YA_{39}	—	October 26, 2011	Haleakala	Pan-STARRS 1	·	1.4 km	MPC · JPL
634589	2011 YB_{48}	—	October 26, 2011	Haleakala	Pan-STARRS 1	·	1.6 km	MPC · JPL
634590	2011 YA_{55}	—	December 29, 2011	Kitt Peak	Spacewatch	·	1.2 km	MPC · JPL
634591	2011 YU_{71}	—	September 28, 2009	Mount Lemmon	Mount Lemmon Survey	L4 · ERY	8.4 km	MPC · JPL
634592	2011 YM_{83}	—	August 2, 2016	Haleakala	Pan-STARRS 1	·	2.8 km	MPC · JPL
634593	2011 YD_{96}	—	December 29, 2011	Mount Lemmon	Mount Lemmon Survey	L4	6.5 km	MPC · JPL
634594	2012 AG_{4}	—	January 1, 2012	Mount Lemmon	Mount Lemmon Survey	L4	8.8 km	MPC · JPL
634595	2012 AJ_{4}	—	October 28, 2001	Palomar	NEAT	BRA	2.0 km	MPC · JPL
634596	2012 AC_{8}	—	October 8, 2008	Kitt Peak	Spacewatch	L4	8.2 km	MPC · JPL
634597	2012 AM_{12}	—	October 22, 2009	Mount Lemmon	Mount Lemmon Survey	L4	7.8 km	MPC · JPL
634598	2012 AZ_{20}	—	July 5, 2003	Kitt Peak	Spacewatch	·	4.9 km	MPC · JPL
634599	2012 AA_{34}	—	January 2, 2012	Mount Lemmon	Mount Lemmon Survey	EUN	1.1 km	MPC · JPL
634600	2012 BJ	—	December 13, 2006	Mount Lemmon	Mount Lemmon Survey	·	2.7 km	MPC · JPL

== 634601–634700 ==
back to top

Designation			Discovery			Properties		Ref
Permanent	Provisional	Named after	Date	Site	Discoverer(s)	Category	Diam.	Ref
634601	2012 BT_{2}	—	January 18, 2012	Kitt Peak	Spacewatch	L4	10 km	MPC · JPL
634602	2012 BM_{3}	—	February 7, 2008	Kitt Peak	Spacewatch	·	1.3 km	MPC · JPL
634603	2012 BQ_{14}	—	August 20, 2006	Palomar	NEAT	·	2.0 km	MPC · JPL
634604	2012 BA_{42}	—	September 10, 2007	Kitt Peak	Spacewatch	L4	8.7 km	MPC · JPL
634605	2012 BN_{46}	—	August 22, 2004	Kitt Peak	Spacewatch	·	2.2 km	MPC · JPL
634606	2012 BZ_{48}	—	September 19, 2003	Kitt Peak	Spacewatch	·	3.5 km	MPC · JPL
634607	2012 BV_{58}	—	February 13, 2008	Kitt Peak	Spacewatch	·	1.1 km	MPC · JPL
634608	2012 BW_{58}	—	April 1, 2008	Mount Lemmon	Mount Lemmon Survey	AEO	880 m	MPC · JPL
634609	2012 BD_{62}	—	April 1, 2003	Apache Point	SDSS Collaboration	·	2.4 km	MPC · JPL
634610	2012 BT_{65}	—	January 20, 2012	Mount Lemmon	Mount Lemmon Survey	HNS	780 m	MPC · JPL
634611	2012 BY_{69}	—	December 18, 2001	Apache Point	SDSS	·	2.2 km	MPC · JPL
634612	2012 BF_{85}	—	November 5, 2005	Mount Lemmon	Mount Lemmon Survey	·	1.9 km	MPC · JPL
634613	2012 BH_{89}	—	December 8, 2010	Mayhill-ISON	L. Elenin	·	2.5 km	MPC · JPL
634614	2012 BT_{91}	—	December 20, 2011	Oukaïmeden	M. Ory	·	2.8 km	MPC · JPL
634615	2012 BF_{92}	—	February 19, 2009	Kitt Peak	Spacewatch	·	550 m	MPC · JPL
634616	2012 BP_{94}	—	February 21, 2009	Kitt Peak	Spacewatch	·	530 m	MPC · JPL
634617	2012 BQ_{108}	—	November 1, 2005	Mount Lemmon	Mount Lemmon Survey	KOR	1.5 km	MPC · JPL
634618	2012 BN_{109}	—	October 18, 2001	Palomar	NEAT	·	860 m	MPC · JPL
634619	2012 BN_{111}	—	April 10, 2002	Palomar	NEAT	·	2.7 km	MPC · JPL
634620	2012 BN_{128}	—	January 30, 2012	Mount Lemmon	Mount Lemmon Survey	MAR	860 m	MPC · JPL
634621	2012 BW_{128}	—	January 29, 2012	Kitt Peak	Spacewatch	SYL	3.7 km	MPC · JPL
634622	2012 BD_{137}	—	August 22, 2003	Palomar	NEAT	·	860 m	MPC · JPL
634623	2012 BB_{141}	—	September 17, 2010	Mount Lemmon	Mount Lemmon Survey	·	670 m	MPC · JPL
634624 Almazgaleev	2012 BL_{141}	Almazgaleev	November 10, 2010	Zelenchukskaya	T. V. Krjačko, B. Satovski	·	3.3 km	MPC · JPL
634625	2012 BN_{143}	—	February 13, 2008	Mount Lemmon	Mount Lemmon Survey	·	1.2 km	MPC · JPL
634626	2012 BW_{144}	—	November 1, 2005	Kitt Peak	Spacewatch	KOR	1.1 km	MPC · JPL
634627	2012 BA_{147}	—	October 30, 2005	Vallemare Borbona	V. S. Casulli	·	1.8 km	MPC · JPL
634628	2012 BH_{148}	—	November 9, 2007	Mount Lemmon	Mount Lemmon Survey	·	600 m	MPC · JPL
634629	2012 BB_{156}	—	February 29, 2008	Kitt Peak	Spacewatch	·	1.8 km	MPC · JPL
634630	2012 BK_{157}	—	September 27, 2003	Kitt Peak	Spacewatch	THM	2.7 km	MPC · JPL
634631	2012 BJ_{181}	—	January 18, 2012	Mount Lemmon	Mount Lemmon Survey	·	1.2 km	MPC · JPL
634632	2012 BU_{181}	—	January 19, 2012	Mount Lemmon	Mount Lemmon Survey	·	1.4 km	MPC · JPL
634633	2012 BO_{185}	—	January 2, 2012	Kitt Peak	Spacewatch	L4	6.5 km	MPC · JPL
634634	2012 CB_{6}	—	February 23, 2007	Kitt Peak	Spacewatch	EOS	1.8 km	MPC · JPL
634635	2012 CS_{9}	—	January 4, 2001	Haleakala	NEAT	·	4.1 km	MPC · JPL
634636	2012 CQ_{21}	—	February 13, 2012	Haleakala	Pan-STARRS 1	GEF	1.1 km	MPC · JPL
634637	2012 CL_{23}	—	November 11, 2004	Kitt Peak	Spacewatch	·	810 m	MPC · JPL
634638	2012 CG_{24}	—	May 8, 2006	Mount Lemmon	Mount Lemmon Survey	·	700 m	MPC · JPL
634639	2012 CU_{38}	—	August 30, 2005	Palomar	NEAT	·	2.6 km	MPC · JPL
634640	2012 CW_{43}	—	October 14, 2004	Palomar	NEAT	·	4.7 km	MPC · JPL
634641	2012 CV_{45}	—	October 1, 2008	Mount Lemmon	Mount Lemmon Survey	L4	7.3 km	MPC · JPL
634642	2012 CL_{46}	—	September 16, 2009	Catalina	CSS	·	3.7 km	MPC · JPL
634643	2012 CY_{52}	—	August 29, 2009	Altschwendt	W. Ries	·	3.8 km	MPC · JPL
634644	2012 CH_{66}	—	February 3, 2012	Haleakala	Pan-STARRS 1	·	1.3 km	MPC · JPL
634645	2012 DU_{4}	—	April 16, 2009	Kitt Peak	Spacewatch	·	560 m	MPC · JPL
634646	2012 DJ_{8}	—	October 27, 2005	Mount Lemmon	Mount Lemmon Survey	·	2.1 km	MPC · JPL
634647	2012 DV_{18}	—	January 18, 2012	Catalina	CSS	EOS	2.5 km	MPC · JPL
634648	2012 DE_{20}	—	April 13, 2002	Palomar	NEAT	EOS	2.5 km	MPC · JPL
634649	2012 DK_{20}	—	September 4, 2010	Kitt Peak	Spacewatch	·	1.8 km	MPC · JPL
634650	2012 DT_{33}	—	July 4, 2005	Palomar	NEAT	·	1.3 km	MPC · JPL
634651	2012 DY_{40}	—	February 26, 2012	Oukaïmeden	C. Rinner	·	4.2 km	MPC · JPL
634652	2012 DG_{51}	—	March 15, 2002	Palomar	NEAT	·	730 m	MPC · JPL
634653	2012 DU_{54}	—	March 20, 2007	La Silla	Vuissoz, C.	·	2.5 km	MPC · JPL
634654	2012 DL_{62}	—	March 1, 2012	Catalina	CSS	·	1.8 km	MPC · JPL
634655	2012 DA_{73}	—	February 26, 2012	Haleakala	Pan-STARRS 1	·	1.8 km	MPC · JPL
634656	2012 DR_{73}	—	August 1, 2000	Cerro Tololo	Deep Ecliptic Survey	·	650 m	MPC · JPL
634657	2012 DJ_{74}	—	February 27, 2012	Haleakala	Pan-STARRS 1	·	550 m	MPC · JPL
634658	2012 DB_{77}	—	February 28, 2012	Haleakala	Pan-STARRS 1	·	1.6 km	MPC · JPL
634659 Colombo	2012 DQ_{85}	Colombo	February 23, 2012	Mount Graham	K. Černis, R. P. Boyl	·	1.5 km	MPC · JPL
634660	2012 DR_{97}	—	April 12, 2002	Palomar	NEAT	·	2.8 km	MPC · JPL
634661	2012 DB_{105}	—	December 16, 2006	Kitt Peak	Spacewatch	·	1.4 km	MPC · JPL
634662	2012 DK_{116}	—	February 24, 2012	Mount Lemmon	Mount Lemmon Survey	·	1.5 km	MPC · JPL
634663	2012 DF_{117}	—	February 25, 2012	Mount Lemmon	Mount Lemmon Survey	·	1.5 km	MPC · JPL
634664	2012 EM_{4}	—	January 31, 2012	Mayhill-ISON	L. Elenin	·	1.5 km	MPC · JPL
634665	2012 EB_{7}	—	May 10, 2004	Kitt Peak	Spacewatch	·	1.6 km	MPC · JPL
634666	2012 ED_{8}	—	February 28, 2012	Haleakala	Pan-STARRS 1	·	1.8 km	MPC · JPL
634667	2012 EG_{16}	—	August 30, 2000	Kitt Peak	Spacewatch	·	1.6 km	MPC · JPL
634668	2012 EE_{17}	—	September 29, 2009	Mount Lemmon	Mount Lemmon Survey	·	3.1 km	MPC · JPL
634669	2012 EG_{20}	—	March 14, 2012	Mount Lemmon	Mount Lemmon Survey	·	500 m	MPC · JPL
634670	2012 EL_{22}	—	October 11, 2006	Kitt Peak	Spacewatch	·	560 m	MPC · JPL
634671	2012 EF_{29}	—	March 13, 2012	Mount Lemmon	Mount Lemmon Survey	AGN	950 m	MPC · JPL
634672	2012 EG_{29}	—	March 15, 2012	Mount Lemmon	Mount Lemmon Survey	·	1.7 km	MPC · JPL
634673	2012 EX_{30}	—	March 13, 2012	Kitt Peak	Spacewatch	·	1.5 km	MPC · JPL
634674	2012 FZ	—	March 16, 2012	Haleakala	Pan-STARRS 1	·	270 m	MPC · JPL
634675	2012 FB_{5}	—	August 28, 2006	Kitt Peak	Spacewatch	·	590 m	MPC · JPL
634676	2012 FA_{15}	—	October 21, 2006	Mount Lemmon	Mount Lemmon Survey	·	2.0 km	MPC · JPL
634677	2012 FF_{16}	—	September 7, 2000	Kitt Peak	Spacewatch	·	1.5 km	MPC · JPL
634678	2012 FJ_{17}	—	March 17, 2012	Mount Lemmon	Mount Lemmon Survey	AST	1.4 km	MPC · JPL
634679	2012 FZ_{17}	—	March 17, 2012	Mount Lemmon	Mount Lemmon Survey	·	1.4 km	MPC · JPL
634680	2012 FW_{21}	—	May 2, 2009	Cerro Burek	Burek, Cerro	·	690 m	MPC · JPL
634681	2012 FJ_{40}	—	August 26, 2003	Cerro Tololo	Deep Ecliptic Survey	·	570 m	MPC · JPL
634682	2012 FE_{41}	—	March 13, 2012	Mount Lemmon	Mount Lemmon Survey	·	1.6 km	MPC · JPL
634683	2012 FX_{41}	—	May 6, 2002	Palomar	NEAT	·	2.9 km	MPC · JPL
634684	2012 FW_{49}	—	February 27, 2012	Haleakala	Pan-STARRS 1	·	550 m	MPC · JPL
634685	2012 FZ_{49}	—	September 22, 2003	Kitt Peak	Spacewatch	·	700 m	MPC · JPL
634686	2012 FO_{58}	—	November 20, 2006	Kitt Peak	Spacewatch	·	1.2 km	MPC · JPL
634687	2012 FP_{59}	—	September 22, 2004	Kitt Peak	Spacewatch	TEL	1.5 km	MPC · JPL
634688	2012 FR_{63}	—	August 26, 2003	Cerro Tololo	Deep Ecliptic Survey	·	2.5 km	MPC · JPL
634689	2012 FW_{66}	—	July 30, 2008	Kitt Peak	Spacewatch	·	2.2 km	MPC · JPL
634690	2012 FH_{70}	—	February 19, 2003	Palomar	NEAT	JUN	1.1 km	MPC · JPL
634691	2012 FZ_{74}	—	February 9, 2005	La Silla	A. Boattini	·	700 m	MPC · JPL
634692	2012 FK_{81}	—	February 10, 2016	Haleakala	Pan-STARRS 1	TIN	1.0 km	MPC · JPL
634693	2012 FF_{85}	—	March 22, 2012	Mount Lemmon	Mount Lemmon Survey	·	2.4 km	MPC · JPL
634694	2012 FV_{85}	—	March 21, 2012	Mount Lemmon	Mount Lemmon Survey	·	1.6 km	MPC · JPL
634695	2012 FH_{98}	—	October 7, 2016	Haleakala	Pan-STARRS 1	SYL	3.1 km	MPC · JPL
634696	2012 FN_{105}	—	March 16, 2012	Mount Lemmon	Mount Lemmon Survey	·	1.3 km	MPC · JPL
634697	2012 FJ_{109}	—	March 17, 2012	Mount Lemmon	Mount Lemmon Survey	·	1.4 km	MPC · JPL
634698	2012 FQ_{110}	—	February 23, 2007	Kitt Peak	Spacewatch	HOF	1.8 km	MPC · JPL
634699	2012 FZ_{113}	—	November 2, 2007	Mount Lemmon	Mount Lemmon Survey	·	520 m	MPC · JPL
634700	2012 FZ_{117}	—	March 16, 2012	Mount Lemmon	Mount Lemmon Survey	·	1.5 km	MPC · JPL

== 634701–634800 ==
back to top

Designation			Discovery			Properties		Ref
Permanent	Provisional	Named after	Date	Site	Discoverer(s)	Category	Diam.	Ref
634701	2012 GU_{3}	—	April 11, 2012	Mount Lemmon	Mount Lemmon Survey	·	1.5 km	MPC · JPL
634702	2012 GH_{4}	—	May 6, 2002	Kitt Peak	Spacewatch	·	670 m	MPC · JPL
634703	2012 GL_{6}	—	September 15, 2009	Kitt Peak	Spacewatch	·	1.7 km	MPC · JPL
634704	2012 GK_{8}	—	November 10, 2010	Kitt Peak	Spacewatch	·	640 m	MPC · JPL
634705	2012 GN_{14}	—	April 1, 2012	Mount Lemmon	Mount Lemmon Survey	·	1.5 km	MPC · JPL
634706	2012 GR_{15}	—	December 5, 1999	Kitt Peak	Spacewatch	·	2.3 km	MPC · JPL
634707	2012 GS_{15}	—	April 13, 2012	Haleakala	Pan-STARRS 1	·	1.6 km	MPC · JPL
634708	2012 GF_{20}	—	April 13, 2012	Bergisch Gladbach	W. Bickel	H	520 m	MPC · JPL
634709	2012 GR_{32}	—	October 26, 2009	Kitt Peak	Spacewatch	·	1.5 km	MPC · JPL
634710	2012 GT_{32}	—	January 14, 2011	Mount Lemmon	Mount Lemmon Survey	·	1.5 km	MPC · JPL
634711	2012 GX_{32}	—	March 11, 2005	Mount Lemmon	Mount Lemmon Survey	·	690 m	MPC · JPL
634712	2012 GE_{33}	—	September 28, 2003	Apache Point	SDSS Collaboration	·	740 m	MPC · JPL
634713	2012 GZ_{33}	—	March 23, 2003	Palomar	NEAT	·	2.2 km	MPC · JPL
634714	2012 GT_{35}	—	September 19, 2003	Kitt Peak	Spacewatch	·	2.6 km	MPC · JPL
634715	2012 GK_{36}	—	January 13, 2005	Kitt Peak	Spacewatch	·	870 m	MPC · JPL
634716	2012 GV_{38}	—	April 25, 2007	Mount Lemmon	Mount Lemmon Survey	·	2.1 km	MPC · JPL
634717	2012 GO_{39}	—	October 25, 2000	Kitt Peak	Spacewatch	·	840 m	MPC · JPL
634718	2012 GG_{49}	—	April 15, 2012	Haleakala	Pan-STARRS 1	·	1.6 km	MPC · JPL
634719	2012 GC_{51}	—	April 1, 2012	Mount Lemmon	Mount Lemmon Survey	·	1.4 km	MPC · JPL
634720	2012 HR_{4}	—	February 19, 2001	Socorro	LINEAR	·	2.6 km	MPC · JPL
634721	2012 HS_{6}	—	March 8, 2005	Mount Lemmon	Mount Lemmon Survey	·	690 m	MPC · JPL
634722	2012 HP_{34}	—	October 18, 2006	Kitt Peak	Spacewatch	·	710 m	MPC · JPL
634723	2012 HY_{34}	—	November 19, 2003	Palomar	NEAT	·	3.8 km	MPC · JPL
634724	2012 HP_{44}	—	November 4, 2007	Kitt Peak	Spacewatch	·	580 m	MPC · JPL
634725	2012 HD_{46}	—	January 5, 2012	Haleakala	Pan-STARRS 1	·	2.0 km	MPC · JPL
634726	2012 HE_{46}	—	April 20, 2012	Siding Spring	SSS	·	2.3 km	MPC · JPL
634727	2012 HV_{55}	—	April 16, 2012	Haleakala	Pan-STARRS 1	·	780 m	MPC · JPL
634728	2012 HW_{57}	—	October 2, 2003	Kitt Peak	Spacewatch	·	3.1 km	MPC · JPL
634729	2012 HW_{64}	—	October 18, 2003	Apache Point	SDSS Collaboration	·	2.8 km	MPC · JPL
634730	2012 HE_{65}	—	October 24, 2003	Kitt Peak	Spacewatch	·	790 m	MPC · JPL
634731	2012 HY_{66}	—	April 29, 2002	Palomar	NEAT	·	820 m	MPC · JPL
634732	2012 HF_{74}	—	September 15, 2002	Palomar	NEAT	·	550 m	MPC · JPL
634733	2012 HG_{74}	—	November 4, 2007	Kitt Peak	Spacewatch	·	620 m	MPC · JPL
634734	2012 HR_{76}	—	October 16, 2007	Mount Lemmon	Mount Lemmon Survey	·	690 m	MPC · JPL
634735	2012 HA_{78}	—	October 18, 2009	Mount Lemmon	Mount Lemmon Survey	·	1.6 km	MPC · JPL
634736	2012 HX_{78}	—	August 18, 2009	Kitt Peak	Spacewatch	·	1.1 km	MPC · JPL
634737	2012 HT_{87}	—	April 18, 2012	Mount Lemmon	Mount Lemmon Survey	·	530 m	MPC · JPL
634738	2012 HP_{93}	—	January 3, 2016	Haleakala	Pan-STARRS 1	·	1.4 km	MPC · JPL
634739	2012 HJ_{105}	—	April 27, 2012	Haleakala	Pan-STARRS 1	·	1.5 km	MPC · JPL
634740	2012 HN_{105}	—	April 21, 2012	Haleakala	Pan-STARRS 1	GAL	1.2 km	MPC · JPL
634741	2012 JY	—	February 3, 2011	Piszkés-tető	K. Sárneczky, Z. Kuli	·	3.2 km	MPC · JPL
634742	2012 JH_{1}	—	May 17, 2007	Wrightwood	J. W. Young	·	3.0 km	MPC · JPL
634743	2012 JS_{2}	—	July 15, 2002	Palomar	NEAT	(2076)	640 m	MPC · JPL
634744	2012 JS_{7}	—	November 19, 2003	Kitt Peak	Spacewatch	·	670 m	MPC · JPL
634745	2012 JS_{13}	—	May 31, 2005	La Silla	G. Bourban, R. Behrend	·	920 m	MPC · JPL
634746	2012 JY_{14}	—	April 22, 2012	Kitt Peak	Spacewatch	·	2.8 km	MPC · JPL
634747	2012 JN_{15}	—	September 26, 2003	Apache Point	SDSS Collaboration	·	1.7 km	MPC · JPL
634748	2012 JH_{18}	—	January 2, 2011	Mount Lemmon	Mount Lemmon Survey	·	780 m	MPC · JPL
634749	2012 JC_{28}	—	May 1, 2003	Kitt Peak	Spacewatch	·	2.0 km	MPC · JPL
634750	2012 JS_{29}	—	February 28, 2008	Mount Lemmon	Mount Lemmon Survey	NYS	1.2 km	MPC · JPL
634751	2012 JR_{33}	—	December 18, 1999	Kitt Peak	Spacewatch	EOS	2.2 km	MPC · JPL
634752	2012 JD_{34}	—	September 19, 2009	Mount Lemmon	Mount Lemmon Survey	·	830 m	MPC · JPL
634753	2012 JO_{34}	—	February 26, 2012	Mount Lemmon	Mount Lemmon Survey	·	2.0 km	MPC · JPL
634754	2012 JE_{36}	—	January 31, 2012	Haleakala	Pan-STARRS 1	·	1.6 km	MPC · JPL
634755	2012 JK_{41}	—	February 13, 2002	Kitt Peak	Spacewatch	·	1.6 km	MPC · JPL
634756	2012 JK_{43}	—	May 15, 2012	Mount Lemmon	Mount Lemmon Survey	AGN	1.0 km	MPC · JPL
634757	2012 JD_{48}	—	August 21, 2006	Kitt Peak	Spacewatch	·	510 m	MPC · JPL
634758	2012 JS_{49}	—	January 28, 2011	Mount Lemmon	Mount Lemmon Survey	·	2.0 km	MPC · JPL
634759	2012 JV_{65}	—	May 15, 2012	Haleakala	Pan-STARRS 1	·	740 m	MPC · JPL
634760	2012 JK_{67}	—	November 6, 2010	Mount Lemmon	Mount Lemmon Survey	L4	8.0 km	MPC · JPL
634761	2012 JK_{71}	—	May 1, 2012	Mount Lemmon	Mount Lemmon Survey	·	1.6 km	MPC · JPL
634762	2012 JR_{71}	—	October 21, 2009	Mount Lemmon	Mount Lemmon Survey	·	1.6 km	MPC · JPL
634763	2012 JS_{71}	—	May 1, 2012	Mount Lemmon	Mount Lemmon Survey	HOF	2.1 km	MPC · JPL
634764	2012 KB_{1}	—	August 30, 2005	Palomar	NEAT	H	510 m	MPC · JPL
634765	2012 KM_{3}	—	May 17, 2012	Mount Lemmon	Mount Lemmon Survey	GEF	960 m	MPC · JPL
634766	2012 KT_{5}	—	December 27, 2006	Mount Lemmon	Mount Lemmon Survey	·	2.6 km	MPC · JPL
634767	2012 KT_{13}	—	October 22, 2003	Apache Point	SDSS Collaboration	·	650 m	MPC · JPL
634768	2012 KC_{14}	—	January 14, 2008	Kitt Peak	Spacewatch	·	740 m	MPC · JPL
634769	2012 KU_{15}	—	July 4, 2002	Kitt Peak	Spacewatch	·	750 m	MPC · JPL
634770	2012 KW_{22}	—	April 27, 2012	Haleakala	Pan-STARRS 1	·	690 m	MPC · JPL
634771	2012 KE_{30}	—	September 26, 2003	Apache Point	SDSS Collaboration	·	2.9 km	MPC · JPL
634772	2012 KG_{30}	—	April 2, 2005	Kitt Peak	Spacewatch	V	590 m	MPC · JPL
634773	2012 KM_{34}	—	May 16, 2012	Mount Lemmon	Mount Lemmon Survey	DOR	2.1 km	MPC · JPL
634774	2012 KD_{40}	—	December 16, 2007	Kitt Peak	Spacewatch	·	600 m	MPC · JPL
634775	2012 KN_{41}	—	May 20, 2012	Mount Lemmon	Mount Lemmon Survey	·	570 m	MPC · JPL
634776	2012 KQ_{41}	—	August 22, 2004	Kitt Peak	Spacewatch	·	1.6 km	MPC · JPL
634777	2012 KH_{53}	—	September 13, 2013	Catalina	CSS	·	1.9 km	MPC · JPL
634778	2012 KM_{60}	—	May 21, 2012	Mount Lemmon	Mount Lemmon Survey	EOS	1.7 km	MPC · JPL
634779	2012 LM	—	May 22, 2012	ESA OGS	ESA OGS	·	2.0 km	MPC · JPL
634780	2012 LU_{9}	—	October 22, 2003	Kitt Peak	Spacewatch	·	790 m	MPC · JPL
634781	2012 LK_{18}	—	August 1, 2005	Siding Spring	SSS	·	950 m	MPC · JPL
634782	2012 LV_{19}	—	March 4, 2006	Kitt Peak	Spacewatch	·	1.7 km	MPC · JPL
634783	2012 LU_{23}	—	September 29, 2009	Mount Lemmon	Mount Lemmon Survey	·	880 m	MPC · JPL
634784	2012 ML_{8}	—	July 4, 2005	Palomar	NEAT	·	910 m	MPC · JPL
634785	2012 MB_{10}	—	April 14, 2008	Mount Lemmon	Mount Lemmon Survey	·	700 m	MPC · JPL
634786	2012 MD_{12}	—	June 16, 2012	Haleakala	Pan-STARRS 1	·	1.9 km	MPC · JPL
634787	2012 MU_{13}	—	May 4, 2006	Kitt Peak	Spacewatch	·	2.1 km	MPC · JPL
634788	2012 MS_{16}	—	August 28, 2005	Anderson Mesa	LONEOS	·	690 m	MPC · JPL
634789	2012 NU_{1}	—	April 23, 2006	Anderson Mesa	LONEOS	·	2.8 km	MPC · JPL
634790	2012 OT_{3}	—	April 27, 2001	Kitt Peak	Spacewatch	·	1.7 km	MPC · JPL
634791	2012 OG_{6}	—	July 5, 2005	Kitt Peak	Spacewatch	PHO	930 m	MPC · JPL
634792	2012 PF_{2}	—	January 29, 2003	Kitt Peak	Spacewatch	·	980 m	MPC · JPL
634793	2012 PC_{3}	—	August 8, 2012	Haleakala	Pan-STARRS 1	·	2.4 km	MPC · JPL
634794	2012 PU_{12}	—	August 10, 2012	Kitt Peak	Spacewatch	V	620 m	MPC · JPL
634795	2012 PC_{16}	—	June 29, 2005	Palomar	NEAT	·	760 m	MPC · JPL
634796	2012 PJ_{18}	—	August 6, 2012	Haleakala	Pan-STARRS 1	·	2.6 km	MPC · JPL
634797	2012 PM_{18}	—	August 27, 2005	Palomar	NEAT	·	1.1 km	MPC · JPL
634798	2012 PZ_{18}	—	April 24, 2001	Anderson Mesa	LONEOS	H	560 m	MPC · JPL
634799	2012 PO_{23}	—	July 29, 2005	Palomar	NEAT	·	740 m	MPC · JPL
634800	2012 PX_{23}	—	January 17, 2010	Dauban	C. Rinner, Kugel, F.	·	2.7 km	MPC · JPL

== 634801–634900 ==
back to top

Designation			Discovery			Properties		Ref
Permanent	Provisional	Named after	Date	Site	Discoverer(s)	Category	Diam.	Ref
634801	2012 PG_{28}	—	July 28, 2005	Palomar	NEAT	NYS	990 m	MPC · JPL
634802	2012 PX_{28}	—	August 13, 2012	Haleakala	Pan-STARRS 1	·	2.5 km	MPC · JPL
634803	2012 PQ_{29}	—	February 10, 2000	Kitt Peak	Spacewatch	BRA	1.7 km	MPC · JPL
634804	2012 PZ_{34}	—	March 4, 2006	Catalina	CSS	BRA	2.1 km	MPC · JPL
634805	2012 PH_{35}	—	August 11, 2012	Siding Spring	SSS	·	1.2 km	MPC · JPL
634806	2012 PY_{36}	—	July 5, 2005	Palomar	NEAT	·	880 m	MPC · JPL
634807	2012 PQ_{45}	—	August 14, 2012	Haleakala	Pan-STARRS 1	·	930 m	MPC · JPL
634808	2012 PD_{52}	—	August 13, 2012	Les Engarouines	L. Bernasconi	L5	7.7 km	MPC · JPL
634809	2012 PE_{57}	—	August 13, 2012	Haleakala	Pan-STARRS 1	KOR	1.1 km	MPC · JPL
634810	2012 PC_{58}	—	August 10, 2012	Kitt Peak	Spacewatch	EOS	1.5 km	MPC · JPL
634811	2012 QG_{7}	—	May 21, 2011	Mount Lemmon	Mount Lemmon Survey	·	2.4 km	MPC · JPL
634812	2012 QB_{14}	—	August 19, 2012	Atacama	IAA-AI	EOS	2.1 km	MPC · JPL
634813	2012 QR_{16}	—	October 23, 2003	Apache Point	SDSS Collaboration	·	3.1 km	MPC · JPL
634814	2012 QL_{19}	—	August 24, 2005	Palomar	NEAT	V	690 m	MPC · JPL
634815	2012 QX_{23}	—	September 30, 2005	Mount Lemmon	Mount Lemmon Survey	·	1.3 km	MPC · JPL
634816	2012 QK_{27}	—	August 30, 2005	Palomar	NEAT	·	890 m	MPC · JPL
634817	2012 QM_{32}	—	December 19, 2009	Mount Lemmon	Mount Lemmon Survey	V	630 m	MPC · JPL
634818	2012 QS_{32}	—	August 25, 2012	Kitt Peak	Spacewatch	·	2.1 km	MPC · JPL
634819	2012 QX_{35}	—	August 25, 2012	Kitt Peak	Spacewatch	·	1.7 km	MPC · JPL
634820	2012 QL_{38}	—	August 31, 2005	Kitt Peak	Spacewatch	·	650 m	MPC · JPL
634821	2012 QT_{42}	—	February 7, 2011	Mayhill-ISON	L. Elenin	·	1.3 km	MPC · JPL
634822	2012 QG_{47}	—	August 17, 2012	Haleakala	Pan-STARRS 1	·	810 m	MPC · JPL
634823	2012 QA_{49}	—	March 27, 2003	Palomar	NEAT	V	960 m	MPC · JPL
634824	2012 QV_{49}	—	August 2, 2001	Palomar	NEAT	·	2.6 km	MPC · JPL
634825	2012 QR_{52}	—	August 26, 2012	Haleakala	Pan-STARRS 1	·	1.0 km	MPC · JPL
634826	2012 QO_{69}	—	August 17, 2012	Haleakala	Pan-STARRS 1	·	1.8 km	MPC · JPL
634827	2012 QC_{73}	—	August 26, 2012	Haleakala	Pan-STARRS 1	·	1.2 km	MPC · JPL
634828	2012 QK_{76}	—	August 26, 2012	Kitt Peak	Spacewatch	L5	8.8 km	MPC · JPL
634829	2012 QJ_{82}	—	August 26, 2012	Haleakala	Pan-STARRS 1	·	1.5 km	MPC · JPL
634830	2012 RW_{1}	—	December 12, 2004	Kitt Peak	Spacewatch	L5	10 km	MPC · JPL
634831	2012 RP_{20}	—	September 10, 2012	Charleston	R. Holmes	·	1.1 km	MPC · JPL
634832	2012 RQ_{20}	—	August 29, 2005	Palomar	NEAT	·	1.2 km	MPC · JPL
634833	2012 RS_{22}	—	October 25, 2001	Palomar	NEAT	NYS	1.2 km	MPC · JPL
634834	2012 RZ_{32}	—	June 5, 2004	Palomar	NEAT	PHO	1.3 km	MPC · JPL
634835	2012 RH_{33}	—	September 13, 2012	Mount Lemmon	Mount Lemmon Survey	·	1.9 km	MPC · JPL
634836	2012 RF_{38}	—	August 16, 2001	Socorro	LINEAR	·	1.1 km	MPC · JPL
634837	2012 RN_{38}	—	September 2, 2007	Mount Lemmon	Mount Lemmon Survey	EOS	2.5 km	MPC · JPL
634838	2012 RO_{39}	—	August 26, 2012	Charleston	R. Holmes	EOS	1.7 km	MPC · JPL
634839	2012 RU_{44}	—	September 14, 2012	Catalina	CSS	·	4.2 km	MPC · JPL
634840	2012 SD_{3}	—	August 24, 2012	Kitt Peak	Spacewatch	L5	10 km	MPC · JPL
634841	2012 SP_{4}	—	September 17, 2012	Kitt Peak	Spacewatch	V	590 m	MPC · JPL
634842	2012 SE_{6}	—	October 11, 2002	Kitt Peak	Spacewatch	·	710 m	MPC · JPL
634843	2012 SS_{6}	—	August 4, 2005	Palomar	NEAT	·	730 m	MPC · JPL
634844	2012 SZ_{7}	—	August 27, 2001	Kitt Peak	Spacewatch	·	860 m	MPC · JPL
634845	2012 SF_{10}	—	September 29, 2001	Palomar Mountain	NEAT	·	2.6 km	MPC · JPL
634846	2012 SX_{12}	—	September 17, 2012	Mount Lemmon	Mount Lemmon Survey	L5	7.4 km	MPC · JPL
634847	2012 SQ_{16}	—	October 9, 2007	Dauban	Kugel, C. R. F.	EOS	2.1 km	MPC · JPL
634848	2012 SR_{16}	—	November 7, 2005	Mauna Kea	A. Boattini	·	930 m	MPC · JPL
634849	2012 SA_{17}	—	September 17, 2012	Kitt Peak	Spacewatch	V	610 m	MPC · JPL
634850	2012 SK_{20}	—	May 25, 2006	Mauna Kea	P. A. Wiegert	KOR	1.3 km	MPC · JPL
634851	2012 SP_{23}	—	September 29, 2005	Mount Lemmon	Mount Lemmon Survey	·	890 m	MPC · JPL
634852	2012 SQ_{25}	—	October 21, 2001	Socorro	LINEAR	CLA	1.5 km	MPC · JPL
634853	2012 SY_{28}	—	August 29, 2005	Palomar	NEAT	(2076)	1.0 km	MPC · JPL
634854	2012 SM_{29}	—	May 4, 2006	Mount Lemmon	Mount Lemmon Survey	·	2.3 km	MPC · JPL
634855	2012 ST_{29}	—	August 4, 2008	Siding Spring	SSS	NYS	940 m	MPC · JPL
634856	2012 SW_{29}	—	September 23, 2001	Kitt Peak	Spacewatch	L5	8.9 km	MPC · JPL
634857	2012 SH_{31}	—	May 24, 2001	Cerro Tololo	Deep Ecliptic Survey	·	1.1 km	MPC · JPL
634858	2012 SP_{37}	—	September 28, 2001	Palomar	NEAT	·	3.3 km	MPC · JPL
634859	2012 SK_{40}	—	August 25, 2001	Kitt Peak	Spacewatch	·	1.4 km	MPC · JPL
634860	2012 SP_{41}	—	September 18, 2012	Mount Lemmon	Mount Lemmon Survey	·	2.8 km	MPC · JPL
634861	2012 SN_{61}	—	March 9, 2011	Kitt Peak	Spacewatch	·	1.1 km	MPC · JPL
634862	2012 SF_{64}	—	May 9, 2002	Palomar	NEAT	NEM	3.4 km	MPC · JPL
634863	2012 SP_{64}	—	June 27, 2001	Anderson Mesa	LONEOS	·	1.4 km	MPC · JPL
634864	2012 SF_{67}	—	September 16, 2012	Kitt Peak	Spacewatch	L5	6.7 km	MPC · JPL
634865	2012 SG_{70}	—	March 13, 2007	Kitt Peak	Spacewatch	·	1.4 km	MPC · JPL
634866	2012 SX_{73}	—	September 25, 2012	Mount Lemmon	Mount Lemmon Survey	L5	7.0 km	MPC · JPL
634867	2012 ST_{93}	—	September 17, 2012	Mount Lemmon	Mount Lemmon Survey	NYS	1.0 km	MPC · JPL
634868	2012 SW_{101}	—	September 19, 2012	Charleston	R. Holmes	VER	2.1 km	MPC · JPL
634869	2012 TV_{1}	—	December 15, 2009	Bergisch Gladbach	W. Bickel	·	1.3 km	MPC · JPL
634870	2012 TW_{4}	—	October 5, 2012	Haleakala	Pan-STARRS 1	L5	8.7 km	MPC · JPL
634871	2012 TH_{7}	—	October 29, 2005	Palomar	NEAT	·	1.3 km	MPC · JPL
634872	2012 TQ_{13}	—	September 24, 2000	Socorro	LINEAR	L5	10 km	MPC · JPL
634873	2012 TO_{14}	—	October 7, 2012	Haleakala	Pan-STARRS 1	L5	7.7 km	MPC · JPL
634874	2012 TT_{17}	—	May 23, 2006	Mount Lemmon	Mount Lemmon Survey	·	2.0 km	MPC · JPL
634875	2012 TC_{20}	—	October 7, 2012	Haleakala	Pan-STARRS 1	L5	10 km	MPC · JPL
634876	2012 TT_{20}	—	August 12, 2006	Palomar	NEAT	·	2.7 km	MPC · JPL
634877	2012 TN_{22}	—	August 28, 2008	Zelenchukskaya	B. Satovski, T. V. Krjačko	V	660 m	MPC · JPL
634878	2012 TG_{35}	—	October 8, 2012	SM Montmagastrell	Bosch, J. M., Olivera, R. M.	L5	7.5 km	MPC · JPL
634879	2012 TO_{44}	—	March 4, 2000	Apache Point	SDSS	·	930 m	MPC · JPL
634880	2012 TC_{48}	—	July 25, 2001	Palomar	NEAT	·	1.1 km	MPC · JPL
634881	2012 TQ_{52}	—	October 9, 2012	Mount Lemmon	Mount Lemmon Survey	L5	7.5 km	MPC · JPL
634882	2012 TW_{57}	—	September 22, 2008	Mount Lemmon	Mount Lemmon Survey	NYS	1.1 km	MPC · JPL
634883	2012 TF_{60}	—	October 18, 2001	Palomar	NEAT	MAS	740 m	MPC · JPL
634884	2012 TG_{78}	—	December 21, 2003	Kitt Peak	Spacewatch	L5	8.0 km	MPC · JPL
634885	2012 TS_{79}	—	October 13, 2001	Kitt Peak	Spacewatch	L5	8.1 km	MPC · JPL
634886	2012 TC_{82}	—	October 19, 2003	Kitt Peak	Spacewatch	·	2.0 km	MPC · JPL
634887	2012 TG_{82}	—	October 5, 2012	Haleakala	Pan-STARRS 1	HYG	1.9 km	MPC · JPL
634888	2012 TR_{85}	—	October 16, 2001	Kitt Peak	Spacewatch	·	3.0 km	MPC · JPL
634889	2012 TV_{88}	—	October 6, 2012	Mount Lemmon	Mount Lemmon Survey	L5	7.6 km	MPC · JPL
634890	2012 TG_{99}	—	April 4, 2002	Palomar	NEAT	·	1.8 km	MPC · JPL
634891	2012 TG_{101}	—	October 9, 2012	Pla D'Arguines	R. Ferrando, Ferrando, M.	·	1.8 km	MPC · JPL
634892	2012 TZ_{101}	—	September 15, 2012	Kitt Peak	Spacewatch	·	1.2 km	MPC · JPL
634893	2012 TN_{108}	—	October 10, 2012	Mount Lemmon	Mount Lemmon Survey	·	1.6 km	MPC · JPL
634894	2012 TJ_{116}	—	September 21, 2012	Kitt Peak	Spacewatch	·	1.2 km	MPC · JPL
634895	2012 TX_{122}	—	October 8, 2012	Haleakala	Pan-STARRS 1	L5	9.6 km	MPC · JPL
634896	2012 TB_{123}	—	June 13, 2011	Mount Lemmon	Mount Lemmon Survey	L5	8.2 km	MPC · JPL
634897	2012 TV_{125}	—	August 23, 2012	Les Engarouines	L. Bernasconi	·	1.3 km	MPC · JPL
634898	2012 TP_{128}	—	October 27, 2000	Kitt Peak	Spacewatch	L5	9.8 km	MPC · JPL
634899	2012 TL_{144}	—	October 10, 2012	Mount Lemmon	Mount Lemmon Survey	L5	8.5 km	MPC · JPL
634900	2012 TD_{149}	—	May 31, 2006	Mount Lemmon	Mount Lemmon Survey	NEM	2.7 km	MPC · JPL

== 634901–635000 ==
back to top

Designation			Discovery			Properties		Ref
Permanent	Provisional	Named after	Date	Site	Discoverer(s)	Category	Diam.	Ref
634901	2012 TQ_{157}	—	September 15, 2012	Kitt Peak	Spacewatch	V	660 m	MPC · JPL
634902	2012 TA_{158}	—	May 5, 2008	Mount Lemmon	Mount Lemmon Survey	L5	7.0 km	MPC · JPL
634903	2012 TM_{159}	—	August 12, 2004	Cerro Tololo	Deep Ecliptic Survey	·	1.3 km	MPC · JPL
634904	2012 TX_{160}	—	October 18, 2001	Palomar	NEAT	THM	2.1 km	MPC · JPL
634905	2012 TG_{170}	—	August 10, 2012	Kitt Peak	Spacewatch	V	660 m	MPC · JPL
634906	2012 TP_{172}	—	October 9, 2012	Mount Lemmon	Mount Lemmon Survey	·	1.9 km	MPC · JPL
634907	2012 TM_{173}	—	October 9, 2012	Mount Lemmon	Mount Lemmon Survey	L5	6.8 km	MPC · JPL
634908	2012 TE_{174}	—	November 8, 2007	Kitt Peak	Spacewatch	·	2.4 km	MPC · JPL
634909	2012 TO_{174}	—	October 9, 2012	Mount Lemmon	Mount Lemmon Survey	L5	7.4 km	MPC · JPL
634910	2012 TD_{177}	—	May 16, 2010	Mount Lemmon	Mount Lemmon Survey	L5	7.5 km	MPC · JPL
634911	2012 TN_{182}	—	January 28, 2007	Mount Lemmon	Mount Lemmon Survey	·	980 m	MPC · JPL
634912	2012 TR_{190}	—	March 29, 2009	Kitt Peak	Spacewatch	·	2.5 km	MPC · JPL
634913	2012 TL_{195}	—	October 10, 2012	Mount Lemmon	Mount Lemmon Survey	·	2.0 km	MPC · JPL
634914	2012 TB_{197}	—	October 10, 2012	Kitt Peak	Spacewatch	·	1.5 km	MPC · JPL
634915	2012 TY_{200}	—	October 11, 2012	Mount Lemmon	Mount Lemmon Survey	·	2.0 km	MPC · JPL
634916	2012 TP_{203}	—	December 8, 2005	Kitt Peak	Spacewatch	·	990 m	MPC · JPL
634917	2012 TX_{208}	—	January 20, 2009	Kitt Peak	Spacewatch	·	1.9 km	MPC · JPL
634918	2012 TQ_{210}	—	October 11, 2012	Mount Lemmon	Mount Lemmon Survey	·	2.5 km	MPC · JPL
634919	2012 TD_{213}	—	January 5, 2003	Kitt Peak	Spacewatch	·	1.3 km	MPC · JPL
634920	2012 TG_{215}	—	September 17, 2012	Nogales	M. Schwartz, P. R. Holvorcem	·	2.6 km	MPC · JPL
634921	2012 TQ_{215}	—	November 6, 2007	Kitt Peak	Spacewatch	·	1.6 km	MPC · JPL
634922	2012 TL_{222}	—	October 14, 2012	Mount Lemmon	Mount Lemmon Survey	THM	2.0 km	MPC · JPL
634923	2012 TM_{223}	—	September 26, 2012	Nogales	M. Schwartz, P. R. Holvorcem	·	2.7 km	MPC · JPL
634924	2012 TK_{224}	—	October 8, 2012	Mount Lemmon	Mount Lemmon Survey	·	2.0 km	MPC · JPL
634925	2012 TC_{225}	—	October 8, 2012	Mount Lemmon	Mount Lemmon Survey	THM	1.9 km	MPC · JPL
634926	2012 TJ_{233}	—	February 26, 2007	Mount Lemmon	Mount Lemmon Survey	L5	9.1 km	MPC · JPL
634927	2012 TX_{235}	—	November 11, 2001	Apache Point	SDSS Collaboration	L5	6.8 km	MPC · JPL
634928	2012 TG_{245}	—	September 6, 2008	Mount Lemmon	Mount Lemmon Survey	·	1.3 km	MPC · JPL
634929	2012 TR_{246}	—	August 26, 2001	Haleakala	NEAT	·	940 m	MPC · JPL
634930	2012 TA_{248}	—	October 11, 2012	Haleakala	Pan-STARRS 1	·	1.1 km	MPC · JPL
634931	2012 TB_{248}	—	November 29, 2005	Kitt Peak	Spacewatch	·	1.4 km	MPC · JPL
634932	2012 TV_{253}	—	January 21, 2007	Altschwendt	W. Ries	·	830 m	MPC · JPL
634933	2012 TX_{253}	—	September 3, 2000	Apache Point	SDSS Collaboration	·	2.7 km	MPC · JPL
634934	2012 TH_{254}	—	October 11, 2012	Piszkés-tető	K. Sárneczky, T. Vorobjov	·	2.5 km	MPC · JPL
634935	2012 TQ_{260}	—	August 26, 2000	Kitt Peak	Spacewatch	·	2.6 km	MPC · JPL
634936	2012 TQ_{263}	—	October 8, 2012	Mount Lemmon	Mount Lemmon Survey	L5	7.7 km	MPC · JPL
634937	2012 TJ_{265}	—	March 18, 2010	Kitt Peak	Spacewatch	AGN	1.2 km	MPC · JPL
634938	2012 TE_{269}	—	October 11, 2012	Mount Lemmon	Mount Lemmon Survey	·	780 m	MPC · JPL
634939	2012 TQ_{272}	—	April 19, 2006	Mount Lemmon	Mount Lemmon Survey	·	1.5 km	MPC · JPL
634940	2012 TZ_{278}	—	November 4, 2007	Kitt Peak	Spacewatch	EOS	1.5 km	MPC · JPL
634941	2012 TB_{280}	—	October 7, 2004	Socorro	LINEAR	H	530 m	MPC · JPL
634942	2012 TA_{281}	—	March 14, 2007	Kitt Peak	Spacewatch	NYS	1.2 km	MPC · JPL
634943	2012 TN_{292}	—	July 15, 2005	Mount Lemmon	Mount Lemmon Survey	·	3.0 km	MPC · JPL
634944	2012 TA_{299}	—	May 24, 2006	Kitt Peak	Spacewatch	AST	1.8 km	MPC · JPL
634945	2012 TR_{300}	—	November 5, 2007	Kitt Peak	Spacewatch	·	3.1 km	MPC · JPL
634946	2012 TQ_{303}	—	September 18, 2012	Kitt Peak	Spacewatch	·	1.3 km	MPC · JPL
634947	2012 TU_{304}	—	June 27, 2004	Kitt Peak	Spacewatch	·	1.4 km	MPC · JPL
634948	2012 TS_{306}	—	September 6, 2008	Catalina	CSS	ERI	1.9 km	MPC · JPL
634949	2012 TW_{306}	—	January 30, 2003	Palomar	NEAT	·	3.2 km	MPC · JPL
634950	2012 TD_{309}	—	March 23, 2003	Apache Point	SDSS Collaboration	V	890 m	MPC · JPL
634951	2012 TC_{312}	—	October 14, 2012	Nogales	M. Schwartz, P. R. Holvorcem	NYS	1.2 km	MPC · JPL
634952	2012 TA_{313}	—	September 30, 2008	Socorro	LINEAR	PHO	930 m	MPC · JPL
634953	2012 TH_{313}	—	September 16, 2012	Kitt Peak	Spacewatch	·	1.2 km	MPC · JPL
634954	2012 TH_{314}	—	June 30, 2001	Haleakala	NEAT	·	1.3 km	MPC · JPL
634955	2012 TN_{315}	—	August 12, 2001	Palomar	NEAT	·	1.2 km	MPC · JPL
634956	2012 TA_{316}	—	October 30, 1997	Mauna Kea	Veillet, C.	·	1.6 km	MPC · JPL
634957	2012 TE_{316}	—	August 27, 2003	Palomar	NEAT	·	2.2 km	MPC · JPL
634958	2012 TZ_{324}	—	October 8, 2012	Mount Lemmon	Mount Lemmon Survey	LIX	2.8 km	MPC · JPL
634959	2012 TY_{327}	—	November 22, 2008	Kitt Peak	Spacewatch	·	1.8 km	MPC · JPL
634960	2012 TQ_{329}	—	February 23, 2003	Campo Imperatore	CINEOS	·	3.0 km	MPC · JPL
634961	2012 TP_{331}	—	September 16, 2012	Mount Lemmon	Mount Lemmon Survey	EOS	1.5 km	MPC · JPL
634962	2012 TA_{332}	—	October 11, 2012	Mount Lemmon	Mount Lemmon Survey	L5	8.6 km	MPC · JPL
634963	2012 TK_{355}	—	October 15, 2012	Mount Lemmon	Mount Lemmon Survey	·	1.2 km	MPC · JPL
634964	2012 TL_{355}	—	October 9, 2012	Haleakala	Pan-STARRS 1	L5	6.4 km	MPC · JPL
634965	2012 TC_{364}	—	October 8, 2012	Mount Lemmon	Mount Lemmon Survey	L5	7.9 km	MPC · JPL
634966	2012 TE_{367}	—	October 8, 2012	Kitt Peak	Spacewatch	·	2.1 km	MPC · JPL
634967	2012 TW_{368}	—	October 10, 2012	Mount Lemmon	Mount Lemmon Survey	·	940 m	MPC · JPL
634968	2012 TW_{379}	—	October 15, 2012	Kitt Peak	Spacewatch	·	2.4 km	MPC · JPL
634969	2012 TP_{387}	—	December 4, 2005	Kitt Peak	Spacewatch	MAS	660 m	MPC · JPL
634970	2012 TE_{390}	—	October 8, 2012	Haleakala	Pan-STARRS 1	V	490 m	MPC · JPL
634971	2012 UY_{6}	—	November 28, 1999	Kitt Peak	Spacewatch	·	1.8 km	MPC · JPL
634972	2012 UY_{11}	—	February 1, 2003	Socorro	LINEAR	·	1.9 km	MPC · JPL
634973	2012 UB_{13}	—	March 2, 2006	Mount Lemmon	Mount Lemmon Survey	·	1.4 km	MPC · JPL
634974	2012 UH_{15}	—	October 16, 2012	Mount Lemmon	Mount Lemmon Survey	L5	7.4 km	MPC · JPL
634975	2012 US_{15}	—	March 16, 2004	Kitt Peak	Spacewatch	·	3.5 km	MPC · JPL
634976	2012 US_{16}	—	March 13, 2007	Mount Lemmon	Mount Lemmon Survey	V	640 m	MPC · JPL
634977	2012 UZ_{16}	—	September 15, 2012	Mount Lemmon	Mount Lemmon Survey	·	2.1 km	MPC · JPL
634978	2012 UB_{22}	—	October 16, 2012	Mount Lemmon	Mount Lemmon Survey	·	1 km	MPC · JPL
634979	2012 UF_{26}	—	July 26, 2011	Haleakala	Pan-STARRS 1	·	2.7 km	MPC · JPL
634980	2012 UG_{27}	—	August 20, 2006	Palomar	NEAT	·	2.8 km	MPC · JPL
634981 Herbertgrice	2012 UW_{29}	Herbertgrice	October 14, 2012	Mayhill	Falla, N.	·	2.4 km	MPC · JPL
634982	2012 UX_{31}	—	October 17, 2012	Mount Lemmon	Mount Lemmon Survey	MAR	1.1 km	MPC · JPL
634983	2012 UY_{31}	—	February 1, 2009	Kitt Peak	Spacewatch	·	2.2 km	MPC · JPL
634984	2012 UQ_{32}	—	March 11, 2005	Kitt Peak	Deep Ecliptic Survey	KOR	1.5 km	MPC · JPL
634985	2012 UW_{36}	—	October 16, 2012	Mount Lemmon	Mount Lemmon Survey	·	2.2 km	MPC · JPL
634986	2012 UY_{36}	—	August 19, 2006	Kitt Peak	Spacewatch	·	2.5 km	MPC · JPL
634987	2012 UC_{45}	—	November 16, 2001	Kitt Peak	Spacewatch	CLA	1.6 km	MPC · JPL
634988	2012 UF_{65}	—	October 20, 2012	Kitt Peak	Spacewatch	·	2.6 km	MPC · JPL
634989	2012 UT_{71}	—	April 10, 2010	Mount Lemmon	Mount Lemmon Survey	EOS	1.6 km	MPC · JPL
634990	2012 UN_{75}	—	May 1, 2003	Kitt Peak	Spacewatch	·	1.1 km	MPC · JPL
634991	2012 UH_{77}	—	February 25, 2001	Haleakala	NEAT	·	2.3 km	MPC · JPL
634992	2012 UU_{78}	—	October 19, 2012	Haleakala	Pan-STARRS 1	·	2.6 km	MPC · JPL
634993	2012 UZ_{82}	—	November 4, 2007	Mount Lemmon	Mount Lemmon Survey	VER	3.0 km	MPC · JPL
634994	2012 UD_{84}	—	October 20, 2012	Kitt Peak	Spacewatch	·	3.0 km	MPC · JPL
634995	2012 UD_{85}	—	September 25, 2012	Mount Lemmon	Mount Lemmon Survey	·	1.4 km	MPC · JPL
634996	2012 UA_{89}	—	October 7, 2008	Mount Lemmon	Mount Lemmon Survey	V	560 m	MPC · JPL
634997	2012 UY_{91}	—	December 15, 2001	Apache Point	SDSS	·	1.3 km	MPC · JPL
634998	2012 US_{97}	—	February 25, 2007	Kitt Peak	Spacewatch	V	620 m	MPC · JPL
634999	2012 UC_{99}	—	October 21, 2003	Kitt Peak	Spacewatch	·	1.7 km	MPC · JPL
635000	2012 UY_{99}	—	March 3, 2000	Apache Point	SDSS	KOR	1.3 km	MPC · JPL

back to top

== Meaning of names ==
As minor planet discoveries are confirmed, they are given a permanent number by the IAU's Minor Planet Center (MPC), and the discoverers can then submit names for them, following the IAU's naming conventions. The list below concerns those minor planets in the specified number-range that have received names, and explains the meanings of those names.

Official naming citations of newly named small Solar System bodies are approved and published in a bulletin by IAU's Working Group for Small Bodies Nomenclature (WGSBN). Before May 2021, citations were published in MPC's Minor Planet Circulars for many decades. Recent citations can also be found on the JPL Small-Body Database (SBDB). Until his death in 2016, German astronomer Lutz D. Schmadel compiled these citations into the Dictionary of Minor Planet Names (DMP) and regularly updated the collection.

Based on Paul Herget's The Names of the Minor Planets, Schmadel also researched the unclear origin of numerous asteroids, most of which had been named prior to World War II. This article incorporates text from this source, which is in the public domain: SBDB New namings may only be added to this list below after official publication as the preannouncement of names is condemned. The WGSBN publishes a comprehensive guideline for the naming rules of non-cometary small Solar System bodies.

Named minor planet	Provisional	This minor planet was named for...	Ref · Catalog
634539 Kuvaev	2011 UQ_{289}	Oleg Mikhailovich Kuvaev (1934–1975), Russian geologist and writer.	IAU · 634539
634559 Drayer	2011 UD_{420}	Evgeny Drayer, Russian musician, singer, composer, multiinstrumentalist, educator, music producer and sound engineer.	IAU · 634559
634624 Almazgaleev	2011 UD_{420}	Almaz Galeev, Russian astronomer at Kazan University.	IAU · 634624
634659 Colombo	2012 DQ_{85}	Sister Regina (Maria) Colombo (1885–1953), one of the four sisters who carried out the cataloging of 500.000 stars in the Vatican zone of the Carte du Ciel star atlas.	IAU · 634659
634981 Herbertgrice	2012 UW_{29}	Herbert Grice (1929–2020), the brother-in-law of the discoverer.	IAU · 634981
