= Meanings of minor-planet names: 249001–250000 =

As minor planet discoveries are confirmed, they are given a permanent number by the IAU's Minor Planet Center (MPC), and the discoverers can then submit names for them, following the IAU's naming conventions. The list below concerns those minor planets in the specified number-range that have received names, and explains the meanings of those names.

Official naming citations of newly named small Solar System bodies are approved and published in a bulletin by IAU's Working Group for Small Bodies Nomenclature (WGSBN). Before May 2021, citations were published in MPC's Minor Planet Circulars for many decades. Recent citations can also be found on the JPL Small-Body Database (SBDB). Until his death in 2016, German astronomer Lutz D. Schmadel compiled these citations into the Dictionary of Minor Planet Names (DMP) and regularly updated the collection.

Based on Paul Herget's The Names of the Minor Planets, Schmadel also researched the unclear origin of numerous asteroids, most of which had been named prior to World War II. This article incorporates text from this source, which is in the public domain: SBDB New namings may only be added to this list below after official publication as the preannouncement of names is condemned. The WGSBN publishes a comprehensive guideline for the naming rules of non-cometary small Solar System bodies.

== 249001–249100 ==
| Named minor planet | Provisional | This minor planet was named for... | Ref · Catalog |
|---|---|---|---|
| 249010 Abdel-Samad | 2007 QE_{5} | Hamed Abdel-Samad (born 1972) is an Egyptian political scientist whose satirical German TV series "Safary through Germany" has initiated a broad national discussion. | JPL · 249010 |
| 249044 Barrymarshall | 2007 TO_{72} | Barry Marshall (born 1951), an Australian microbiologist and Nobel laureate | JPL · 249044 |
| 249061 Antonyberger | 2007 TG_{298} | Antony R. Berger (born 1937), a Canadian geologist who has helped launch many international scientific NGOs, including the Association of Geoscientists for International Development. He has authored over 130 publications in earth science, science policy and environmental issues. | JPL · 249061 |

== 249101–249200 ==
back to top

| Named minor planet | Provisional | This minor planet was named for... | Ref · Catalog |
|---|---|---|---|
| 249160 Urriellu | 2008 BO_{14} | The Picu Urriellu (a.k.a. Naranjo de Bulnes), a limestone peak of the Picos de Europa in northern Spain | JPL · 249160 |

== 249201–249300 ==
back to top

| Named minor planet | Provisional | This minor planet was named for... | Ref · Catalog |
|---|---|---|---|
| 249300 Karenmortfield | 2008 UY | Karen Mortfield (born 1958) is a Canadian public affairs specialist. As a volunteer, she played a leadership role in the renaissance of the David Dunlap Observatory in Canada, working from 2009 to 2017 to repurpose the 80-year old Observatory as a space science campus. | JPL · 249300 |

== 249301–249400 ==
back to top

| Named minor planet | Provisional | This minor planet was named for... | Ref · Catalog |
|---|---|---|---|
| 249302 Ajoie | 2008 UM_{7} | Ajoie, a region in the canton of Jura, Switzerland, that corresponds to the Porrentruy District, located north of the Swiss Jura | JPL · 249302 |

== 249401–249500 ==
back to top

| Named minor planet | Provisional | This minor planet was named for... | Ref · Catalog |
|---|---|---|---|
There are no named minor planets in this number range

== 249501–249600 ==
back to top

| Named minor planet | Provisional | This minor planet was named for... | Ref · Catalog |
|---|---|---|---|
| 249514 Donaldroyer | 2010 CZ_{44} | Donald Royer (born 1942), an expert in the systems needed to operate and communicate with NASA space missions. He served as the mission operations systems manager for the WISE mission. | JPL · 249514 |
| 249515 Heinrichsen | 2010 CF_{48} | Ingolf Heinrichsen (born 1964), an expert in the systems engineering, operations, and management of space telescopes, including the Kepler mission, the Wide-field Infrared Survey Explorer and the Spitzer Space Telescope | JPL · 249515 |
| 249516 Aretha | 2010 CV60 | Aretha Franklin (1942–2018), an American singer known as the Queen of Soul who has won 17 Grammy Awards and has influenced countless singers | JPL · 249516 |
| 249519 Whitneyclavin | 2010 CA_{130} | Whitney Clavin (born 1971), a science writer who works to inform the public about results from NASA astronomy missions such as Spitzer, Kepler and WISE | JPL · 249519 |
| 249520 Luppino | 2010 CG_{181} | Gerard A. Luppino (1959–2016) was an astronomer at the University of Hawaii, where he pioneered the construction of large-format mosaic CCD cameras for astronomy. He later formed GL Scientific, a company that fabricated instruments for many telescopes and space experiments. | JPL · 249520 |
| 249521 Truth | 2010 CU_{212} | Sojourner Truth (c. 1797–1883), an American abolitionist and advocate for women's rights | JPL · 249521 |
| 249522 Johndailey | 2010 DP_{15} | John Dailey (born 1978), a software engineer who was the lead developer for the Wide-field Infrared Survey Explorer's moving object processing system for identifying minor planets in the project's infrared images | JPL · 249522 |
| 249523 Friedan | 2010 DO_{53} | Betty Friedan (1921–2006), an author and social activist who wrote The Feminine Mystique, a book that made an enormous impact on women's lives. | JPL · 249523 |
| 249530 Ericrice | 2010 GJ_{92} | Eric Rice (born 1979), a systems engineer specializing in fault protection. He has served as the fault protection engineer for several NASA spacecraft, including the Wide-field Infrared Survey Explorer | JPL · 249530 |
| 249539 Pedrosevilla | 2010 HY_{7} | Pedro Sevilla (born 1967), an engineer who worked on the payload electronics and focal planes of the Wide-field Infrared Survey Explorer mission | JPL · 249539 |
| 249540 Eugeniescott | 2010 HX_{14} | Eugenie Scott (born 1946), an American physical anthropologist | JPL · 249540 |
| 249541 Steinem | 2010 HR_{25} | Gloria Steinem (born 1934), a writer and journalist who co-founded Ms. Magazine and the Ms. Foundation for Women | JPL · 249541 |
| 249542 Edwardyoung | 2010 HS_{37} | Edward Young, American professor of Geochemistry at the University of California, Los Angeles. | IAU · 249542 |
| 249544 Ianmclean | 2010 HQ_{44} | Ian McLean (born 1949), a professor of astronomy at the University of California, Los Angeles | JPL · 249544 |

== 249601–249700 ==
back to top

| Named minor planet | Provisional | This minor planet was named for... | Ref · Catalog |
|---|---|---|---|
There are no named minor planets in this number range

== 249701–249800 ==
back to top

| Named minor planet | Provisional | This minor planet was named for... | Ref · Catalog |
|---|---|---|---|
There are no named minor planets in this number range

== 249801–249900 ==
back to top

| Named minor planet | Provisional | This minor planet was named for... | Ref · Catalog |
|---|---|---|---|
| 249823 Delmarbarker | 2001 FK_{219} | Delmar Barker (1941-2023), American physicist whose primary field of research was the electromagnetic spectrum. | IAU · 249823 |

== 249901–250000 ==
back to top

| Named minor planet | Provisional | This minor planet was named for... | Ref · Catalog |
|---|---|---|---|
There are no named minor planets in this number range

back to top

| Preceded by 248,001–249,000 | Meanings of minor-planet names List of minor planets: 249,001–250,000 | Succeeded by 250,001–251,000 |
