= List of minor planets: 249001–250000 =

The following is a partial list of minor planets, running from minor-planet number 249001 through 250000, inclusive. The primary data for this and other partial lists is based on JPL's "Small-Body Orbital Elements" and data available from the Minor Planet Center. Critical list information is also provided by the MPC, unless otherwise specified from Lowell Observatory. A detailed description of the table's columns and additional sources are given on the main page including a complete list of every page in this series, and a statistical break-up on the dynamical classification of minor planets.

Also see the summary list of all named bodies in numerical and alphabetical order, and the corresponding naming citations for the number range of this particular list. New namings may only be added to this list after official publication, as the preannouncement of names is condemned by the Working Group for Small Bodies Nomenclature of the International Astronomical Union.

Near-Earth obj.	MBA (inner)	MBA (outer)	Centaur
Mars-crosser	MBA (middle)	Jupiter trojan	Trans-Neptunian obj.
Unclassified

== 249001–249100 ==
Designation			Discovery			Properties		Ref
Permanent	Provisional	Named after	Date	Site	Discoverer(s)	Category	Diam.	Ref
249001	2007 JM_{45}	—	May 11, 2007	Kitt Peak	Spacewatch	EOS	4.2 km	MPC · JPL
249002	2007 MZ_{19}	—	June 21, 2007	Kitt Peak	Spacewatch	·	5.6 km	MPC · JPL
249003	2007 NA	—	July 4, 2007	Mount Lemmon	Mount Lemmon Survey	·	7.7 km	MPC · JPL
249004	2007 PM_{5}	—	August 6, 2007	Socorro	LINEAR	·	3.0 km	MPC · JPL
249005	2007 PB_{9}	—	August 9, 2007	Dauban	Chante-Perdrix	L4	16 km	MPC · JPL
249006	2007 PR_{16}	—	August 8, 2007	Socorro	LINEAR	·	1.6 km	MPC · JPL
249007	2007 PY_{37}	—	August 13, 2007	Socorro	LINEAR	·	3.0 km	MPC · JPL
249008	2007 QJ	—	August 16, 2007	Bisei SG Center	BATTeRS	·	4.9 km	MPC · JPL
249009	2007 QB_{2}	—	August 21, 2007	La Sagra	OAM	·	5.8 km	MPC · JPL
249010 Abdel-Samad	2007 QE_{5}	Abdel-Samad	August 26, 2007	Wildberg	R. Apitzsch	·	4.2 km	MPC · JPL
249011	2007 RO_{6}	—	September 3, 2007	Catalina	CSS	·	2.7 km	MPC · JPL
249012	2007 RL_{31}	—	September 5, 2007	Catalina	CSS	·	6.4 km	MPC · JPL
249013	2007 RK_{42}	—	September 9, 2007	Kitt Peak	Spacewatch	·	2.9 km	MPC · JPL
249014	2007 RZ_{45}	—	September 9, 2007	Kitt Peak	Spacewatch	SUL	2.7 km	MPC · JPL
249015	2007 RN_{113}	—	September 11, 2007	Kitt Peak	Spacewatch	·	690 m	MPC · JPL
249016	2007 RK_{116}	—	September 11, 2007	Kitt Peak	Spacewatch	·	4.4 km	MPC · JPL
249017	2007 RE_{119}	—	September 11, 2007	Purple Mountain	PMO NEO Survey Program	HIL · 3:2	6.4 km	MPC · JPL
249018	2007 RF_{139}	—	September 15, 2007	Pla D'Arguines	R. Ferrando	·	2.6 km	MPC · JPL
249019	2007 RK_{149}	—	September 12, 2007	Catalina	CSS	·	1.3 km	MPC · JPL
249020	2007 RC_{171}	—	September 10, 2007	Kitt Peak	Spacewatch	·	4.2 km	MPC · JPL
249021	2007 RC_{179}	—	September 10, 2007	Mount Lemmon	Mount Lemmon Survey	·	5.2 km	MPC · JPL
249022	2007 RZ_{179}	—	September 10, 2007	Mount Lemmon	Mount Lemmon Survey	·	1.3 km	MPC · JPL
249023	2007 RS_{207}	—	September 10, 2007	Kitt Peak	Spacewatch	·	1.3 km	MPC · JPL
249024	2007 RP_{216}	—	September 13, 2007	Catalina	CSS	·	3.6 km	MPC · JPL
249025	2007 RZ_{233}	—	September 12, 2007	Catalina	CSS	·	1.2 km	MPC · JPL
249026	2007 RW_{262}	—	September 15, 2007	Kitt Peak	Spacewatch	·	2.5 km	MPC · JPL
249027	2007 RN_{280}	—	September 13, 2007	Catalina	CSS	·	7.2 km	MPC · JPL
249028	2007 RS_{297}	—	September 3, 2007	Catalina	CSS	·	3.5 km	MPC · JPL
249029	2007 SZ_{6}	—	September 18, 2007	Catalina	CSS	·	1.1 km	MPC · JPL
249030	2007 SJ_{14}	—	September 20, 2007	Catalina	CSS	·	5.4 km	MPC · JPL
249031	2007 SK_{23}	—	September 26, 2007	Mount Lemmon	Mount Lemmon Survey	·	1.0 km	MPC · JPL
249032	2007 TA	—	October 1, 2007	Eskridge	G. Hug	L4	11 km	MPC · JPL
249033	2007 TM_{2}	—	October 5, 2007	Kitt Peak	Spacewatch	·	4.5 km	MPC · JPL
249034	2007 TR_{16}	—	October 4, 2007	Catalina	CSS	·	4.2 km	MPC · JPL
249035	2007 TQ_{17}	—	October 7, 2007	Dauban	Chante-Perdrix	·	4.3 km	MPC · JPL
249036	2007 TV_{20}	—	October 9, 2007	Altschwendt	W. Ries	·	2.6 km	MPC · JPL
249037	2007 TL_{22}	—	October 8, 2007	Kitt Peak	Spacewatch	·	1.1 km	MPC · JPL
249038	2007 TL_{46}	—	October 8, 2007	Catalina	CSS	PHO	1.6 km	MPC · JPL
249039	2007 TW_{61}	—	October 7, 2007	Mount Lemmon	Mount Lemmon Survey	·	4.1 km	MPC · JPL
249040	2007 TM_{62}	—	October 7, 2007	Mount Lemmon	Mount Lemmon Survey	·	2.4 km	MPC · JPL
249041	2007 TW_{70}	—	October 13, 2007	Goodricke-Pigott	R. A. Tucker	·	1.0 km	MPC · JPL
249042	2007 TO_{71}	—	October 15, 2007	Bisei SG Center	BATTeRS	·	1.5 km	MPC · JPL
249043	2007 TA_{72}	—	October 14, 2007	Bergisch Gladbach	W. Bickel	·	2.6 km	MPC · JPL
249044 Barrymarshall	2007 TO_{72}	Barrymarshall	October 15, 2007	Vallemare Borbona	V. S. Casulli	·	1.1 km	MPC · JPL
249045	2007 TR_{78}	—	October 5, 2007	Kitt Peak	Spacewatch	·	4.2 km	MPC · JPL
249046	2007 TV_{82}	—	October 8, 2007	Catalina	CSS	·	890 m	MPC · JPL
249047	2007 TC_{91}	—	October 8, 2007	Mount Lemmon	Mount Lemmon Survey	T_{j} (2.95)	8.1 km	MPC · JPL
249048	2007 TF_{114}	—	October 8, 2007	Catalina	CSS	·	880 m	MPC · JPL
249049	2007 TN_{122}	—	October 6, 2007	Kitt Peak	Spacewatch	·	2.8 km	MPC · JPL
249050	2007 TS_{127}	—	October 6, 2007	Kitt Peak	Spacewatch	HOF	2.9 km	MPC · JPL
249051	2007 TM_{129}	—	October 6, 2007	Kitt Peak	Spacewatch	·	990 m	MPC · JPL
249052	2007 TN_{129}	—	October 6, 2007	Kitt Peak	Spacewatch	·	6.8 km	MPC · JPL
249053	2007 TC_{140}	—	October 9, 2007	Catalina	CSS	·	1.1 km	MPC · JPL
249054	2007 TB_{142}	—	October 9, 2007	Mount Lemmon	Mount Lemmon Survey	·	2.5 km	MPC · JPL
249055	2007 TW_{146}	—	October 6, 2007	Socorro	LINEAR	·	3.7 km	MPC · JPL
249056	2007 TK_{214}	—	October 7, 2007	Kitt Peak	Spacewatch	HOF	3.5 km	MPC · JPL
249057	2007 TP_{220}	—	October 8, 2007	Catalina	CSS	·	5.0 km	MPC · JPL
249058	2007 TX_{244}	—	October 8, 2007	Catalina	CSS	·	1.6 km	MPC · JPL
249059	2007 TP_{249}	—	October 11, 2007	Mount Lemmon	Mount Lemmon Survey	HOF	2.9 km	MPC · JPL
249060	2007 TT_{289}	—	October 12, 2007	Catalina	CSS	3:2	7.1 km	MPC · JPL
249061 Antonyberger	2007 TG_{298}	Antonyberger	October 11, 2007	Anderson Mesa	Wasserman, L. H.	HOF	3.3 km	MPC · JPL
249062	2007 TR_{360}	—	October 14, 2007	Mount Lemmon	Mount Lemmon Survey	·	3.1 km	MPC · JPL
249063	2007 TS_{364}	—	October 15, 2007	Catalina	CSS	TEL	4.3 km	MPC · JPL
249064	2007 TP_{384}	—	October 14, 2007	Mount Lemmon	Mount Lemmon Survey	·	1.1 km	MPC · JPL
249065	2007 TR_{393}	—	October 15, 2007	Kitt Peak	Spacewatch	·	4.2 km	MPC · JPL
249066	2007 TF_{405}	—	October 15, 2007	Kitt Peak	Spacewatch	VER	4.7 km	MPC · JPL
249067	2007 TW_{425}	—	October 8, 2007	Mount Lemmon	Mount Lemmon Survey	·	2.0 km	MPC · JPL
249068	2007 TY_{452}	—	October 14, 2007	Mount Lemmon	Mount Lemmon Survey	·	1.3 km	MPC · JPL
249069	2007 UP_{7}	—	October 16, 2007	Catalina	CSS	·	2.6 km	MPC · JPL
249070	2007 UU_{34}	—	October 18, 2007	Kitt Peak	Spacewatch	·	3.2 km	MPC · JPL
249071	2007 UK_{61}	—	October 30, 2007	Mount Lemmon	Mount Lemmon Survey	·	1.6 km	MPC · JPL
249072	2007 UE_{84}	—	October 30, 2007	Kitt Peak	Spacewatch	·	4.6 km	MPC · JPL
249073	2007 UV_{85}	—	October 30, 2007	Kitt Peak	Spacewatch	·	4.5 km	MPC · JPL
249074	2007 UE_{88}	—	October 30, 2007	Kitt Peak	Spacewatch	·	4.0 km	MPC · JPL
249075	2007 UE_{96}	—	October 30, 2007	Kitt Peak	Spacewatch	·	1.9 km	MPC · JPL
249076	2007 UE_{115}	—	October 31, 2007	Kitt Peak	Spacewatch	EOS	3.7 km	MPC · JPL
249077	2007 US_{125}	—	October 30, 2007	Kitt Peak	Spacewatch	·	1.9 km	MPC · JPL
249078	2007 UR_{128}	—	October 20, 2007	Mount Lemmon	Mount Lemmon Survey	·	2.0 km	MPC · JPL
249079	2007 VU_{2}	—	November 3, 2007	La Cañada	Lacruz, J.	·	1.7 km	MPC · JPL
249080	2007 VR_{5}	—	November 4, 2007	La Sagra	OAM	EUP	6.2 km	MPC · JPL
249081	2007 VT_{19}	—	November 1, 2007	Kitt Peak	Spacewatch	·	1.8 km	MPC · JPL
249082	2007 VF_{20}	—	November 1, 2007	Kitt Peak	Spacewatch	·	940 m	MPC · JPL
249083	2007 VT_{20}	—	November 2, 2007	Mount Lemmon	Mount Lemmon Survey	·	2.5 km	MPC · JPL
249084	2007 VB_{27}	—	November 2, 2007	Mount Lemmon	Mount Lemmon Survey	·	4.6 km	MPC · JPL
249085	2007 VH_{32}	—	November 2, 2007	Kitt Peak	Spacewatch	·	4.7 km	MPC · JPL
249086	2007 VR_{38}	—	November 2, 2007	Catalina	CSS	·	4.4 km	MPC · JPL
249087	2007 VC_{52}	—	November 1, 2007	Kitt Peak	Spacewatch	·	1.1 km	MPC · JPL
249088	2007 VC_{55}	—	November 1, 2007	Kitt Peak	Spacewatch	·	1.2 km	MPC · JPL
249089	2007 VL_{55}	—	November 1, 2007	Kitt Peak	Spacewatch	PHO	3.0 km	MPC · JPL
249090	2007 VM_{62}	—	November 1, 2007	Kitt Peak	Spacewatch	·	1.1 km	MPC · JPL
249091	2007 VV_{93}	—	November 5, 2007	Socorro	LINEAR	·	1.4 km	MPC · JPL
249092	2007 VJ_{119}	—	November 4, 2007	Purple Mountain	PMO NEO Survey Program	·	1.3 km	MPC · JPL
249093	2007 VT_{158}	—	November 5, 2007	Kitt Peak	Spacewatch	·	920 m	MPC · JPL
249094	2007 VX_{161}	—	November 5, 2007	Kitt Peak	Spacewatch	·	3.3 km	MPC · JPL
249095	2007 VH_{166}	—	November 5, 2007	Kitt Peak	Spacewatch	·	2.5 km	MPC · JPL
249096	2007 VG_{176}	—	November 4, 2007	Mount Lemmon	Mount Lemmon Survey	·	3.9 km	MPC · JPL
249097	2007 VS_{176}	—	November 5, 2007	Mount Lemmon	Mount Lemmon Survey	·	1.1 km	MPC · JPL
249098	2007 VB_{181}	—	November 7, 2007	Catalina	CSS	·	4.3 km	MPC · JPL
249099	2007 VU_{190}	—	November 11, 2007	Lulin	LUSS	·	2.9 km	MPC · JPL
249100	2007 VZ_{239}	—	November 7, 2007	Catalina	CSS	·	1.3 km	MPC · JPL

== 249101–249200 ==
back to top

Designation			Discovery			Properties		Ref
Permanent	Provisional	Named after	Date	Site	Discoverer(s)	Category	Diam.	Ref
249101	2007 VF_{241}	—	November 11, 2007	Mount Lemmon	Mount Lemmon Survey	·	3.7 km	MPC · JPL
249102	2007 VS_{241}	—	November 12, 2007	Catalina	CSS	V	970 m	MPC · JPL
249103	2007 VO_{244}	—	November 15, 2007	Socorro	LINEAR	·	910 m	MPC · JPL
249104	2007 VO_{279}	—	November 14, 2007	Kitt Peak	Spacewatch	·	1.5 km	MPC · JPL
249105	2007 VV_{292}	—	November 15, 2007	Catalina	CSS	·	4.3 km	MPC · JPL
249106	2007 VE_{293}	—	November 15, 2007	Catalina	CSS	·	1.1 km	MPC · JPL
249107	2007 VA_{296}	—	November 14, 2007	Kitt Peak	Spacewatch	MAS	1.1 km	MPC · JPL
249108	2007 VQ_{300}	—	November 14, 2007	Anderson Mesa	LONEOS	·	5.3 km	MPC · JPL
249109	2007 VH_{306}	—	November 11, 2007	Mount Lemmon	Mount Lemmon Survey	NYS	1.6 km	MPC · JPL
249110	2007 VS_{310}	—	November 14, 2007	Kitt Peak	Spacewatch	·	2.7 km	MPC · JPL
249111	2007 VE_{311}	—	November 2, 2007	Kitt Peak	Spacewatch	·	5.0 km	MPC · JPL
249112	2007 VH_{311}	—	November 4, 2007	Kitt Peak	Spacewatch	EOS	4.2 km	MPC · JPL
249113	2007 VC_{327}	—	November 6, 2007	Kitt Peak	Spacewatch	(21885)	4.2 km	MPC · JPL
249114	2007 VU_{327}	—	November 8, 2007	Socorro	LINEAR	EOS	4.0 km	MPC · JPL
249115	2007 VD_{329}	—	November 12, 2007	Socorro	LINEAR	·	980 m	MPC · JPL
249116	2007 WF_{3}	—	November 16, 2007	Mount Lemmon	Mount Lemmon Survey	V	950 m	MPC · JPL
249117	2007 WW_{8}	—	November 18, 2007	Socorro	LINEAR	·	4.5 km	MPC · JPL
249118	2007 WW_{9}	—	November 17, 2007	Junk Bond	D. Healy	·	1.2 km	MPC · JPL
249119	2007 WV_{18}	—	November 18, 2007	Mount Lemmon	Mount Lemmon Survey	·	4.8 km	MPC · JPL
249120	2007 WO_{31}	—	November 19, 2007	Kitt Peak	Spacewatch	·	2.6 km	MPC · JPL
249121	2007 XW_{19}	—	December 12, 2007	Socorro	LINEAR	·	1.1 km	MPC · JPL
249122	2007 XU_{21}	—	December 10, 2007	Socorro	LINEAR	·	2.2 km	MPC · JPL
249123	2007 XM_{30}	—	December 15, 2007	Kitt Peak	Spacewatch	·	4.8 km	MPC · JPL
249124	2007 XO_{32}	—	December 15, 2007	Catalina	CSS	·	5.8 km	MPC · JPL
249125	2007 XK_{53}	—	December 14, 2007	Mount Lemmon	Mount Lemmon Survey	·	1.8 km	MPC · JPL
249126	2007 YD_{14}	—	December 17, 2007	Mount Lemmon	Mount Lemmon Survey	·	3.2 km	MPC · JPL
249127	2007 YR_{19}	—	December 16, 2007	Kitt Peak	Spacewatch	·	5.3 km	MPC · JPL
249128	2007 YS_{23}	—	December 17, 2007	Mount Lemmon	Mount Lemmon Survey	EOS	4.3 km	MPC · JPL
249129	2007 YR_{47}	—	December 30, 2007	Dauban	Chante-Perdrix	·	2.3 km	MPC · JPL
249130	2007 YV_{52}	—	December 30, 2007	Catalina	CSS	ADE	3.5 km	MPC · JPL
249131	2007 YG_{56}	—	December 30, 2007	Junk Bond	D. Healy	·	4.0 km	MPC · JPL
249132	2007 YG_{60}	—	December 30, 2007	Catalina	CSS	·	5.6 km	MPC · JPL
249133	2007 YJ_{63}	—	December 31, 2007	Kitt Peak	Spacewatch	NYS	1.5 km	MPC · JPL
249134	2007 YN_{64}	—	December 18, 2007	Mount Lemmon	Mount Lemmon Survey	NYS	2.2 km	MPC · JPL
249135	2007 YR_{64}	—	December 18, 2007	Mount Lemmon	Mount Lemmon Survey	·	4.1 km	MPC · JPL
249136	2007 YR_{68}	—	December 20, 2007	Mount Lemmon	Mount Lemmon Survey	·	5.4 km	MPC · JPL
249137	2008 AC_{4}	—	January 8, 2008	Dauban	Kugel, F.	·	4.3 km	MPC · JPL
249138	2008 AK_{4}	—	January 9, 2008	Lulin	LUSS	·	4.5 km	MPC · JPL
249139	2008 AV_{4}	—	January 7, 2008	Lulin	LUSS	·	4.6 km	MPC · JPL
249140	2008 AY_{15}	—	January 10, 2008	Mount Lemmon	Mount Lemmon Survey	·	2.6 km	MPC · JPL
249141	2008 AE_{33}	—	January 11, 2008	Kitt Peak	Spacewatch	·	6.4 km	MPC · JPL
249142	2008 AH_{35}	—	January 10, 2008	Kitt Peak	Spacewatch	·	3.2 km	MPC · JPL
249143	2008 AY_{39}	—	January 10, 2008	Mount Lemmon	Mount Lemmon Survey	HOF	3.2 km	MPC · JPL
249144	2008 AX_{43}	—	January 10, 2008	Kitt Peak	Spacewatch	EOS	3.3 km	MPC · JPL
249145	2008 AV_{53}	—	January 11, 2008	Kitt Peak	Spacewatch	·	3.0 km	MPC · JPL
249146	2008 AT_{56}	—	January 11, 2008	Kitt Peak	Spacewatch	·	3.3 km	MPC · JPL
249147	2008 AW_{58}	—	January 11, 2008	Kitt Peak	Spacewatch	NYS	1.8 km	MPC · JPL
249148	2008 AY_{63}	—	January 11, 2008	Kitt Peak	Spacewatch	·	3.8 km	MPC · JPL
249149	2008 AD_{69}	—	January 11, 2008	Kitt Peak	Spacewatch	·	2.7 km	MPC · JPL
249150	2008 AA_{72}	—	January 13, 2008	Mount Lemmon	Mount Lemmon Survey	·	5.0 km	MPC · JPL
249151	2008 AW_{77}	—	January 12, 2008	Kitt Peak	Spacewatch	KOR	3.7 km	MPC · JPL
249152	2008 AX_{80}	—	January 12, 2008	Kitt Peak	Spacewatch	GEF	1.7 km	MPC · JPL
249153	2008 AO_{95}	—	January 14, 2008	Kitt Peak	Spacewatch	·	4.4 km	MPC · JPL
249154	2008 AD_{110}	—	January 15, 2008	Kitt Peak	Spacewatch	EOS	3.0 km	MPC · JPL
249155	2008 AH_{115}	—	January 10, 2008	Mount Lemmon	Mount Lemmon Survey	·	5.2 km	MPC · JPL
249156	2008 AK_{136}	—	January 12, 2008	Socorro	LINEAR	·	5.9 km	MPC · JPL
249157	2008 BU_{9}	—	January 16, 2008	Kitt Peak	Spacewatch	·	4.1 km	MPC · JPL
249158	2008 BK_{10}	—	January 16, 2008	Kitt Peak	Spacewatch	·	4.9 km	MPC · JPL
249159	2008 BF_{13}	—	January 19, 2008	Mount Lemmon	Mount Lemmon Survey	·	4.2 km	MPC · JPL
249160 Urriellu	2008 BO_{14}	Urriellu	January 25, 2008	La Cañada	Lacruz, J.	·	4.0 km	MPC · JPL
249161	2008 BF_{21}	—	January 30, 2008	Mount Lemmon	Mount Lemmon Survey	·	4.6 km	MPC · JPL
249162	2008 BA_{23}	—	January 31, 2008	Mount Lemmon	Mount Lemmon Survey	·	4.7 km	MPC · JPL
249163	2008 BY_{26}	—	January 30, 2008	Mount Lemmon	Mount Lemmon Survey	HYG	3.6 km	MPC · JPL
249164	2008 BR_{29}	—	January 30, 2008	Catalina	CSS	·	2.8 km	MPC · JPL
249165	2008 BT_{32}	—	January 30, 2008	Kitt Peak	Spacewatch	·	2.5 km	MPC · JPL
249166	2008 BD_{33}	—	January 30, 2008	Kitt Peak	Spacewatch	·	2.3 km	MPC · JPL
249167	2008 BA_{35}	—	January 30, 2008	Mount Lemmon	Mount Lemmon Survey	·	1.6 km	MPC · JPL
249168	2008 BJ_{36}	—	January 30, 2008	Kitt Peak	Spacewatch	NYS	1.8 km	MPC · JPL
249169	2008 CZ_{5}	—	February 7, 2008	Mayhill	Lowe, A.	TIR	4.8 km	MPC · JPL
249170	2008 CC_{12}	—	February 3, 2008	Kitt Peak	Spacewatch	HOF	3.0 km	MPC · JPL
249171	2008 CZ_{24}	—	February 1, 2008	Kitt Peak	Spacewatch	·	2.3 km	MPC · JPL
249172	2008 CE_{40}	—	February 2, 2008	Mount Lemmon	Mount Lemmon Survey	·	5.5 km	MPC · JPL
249173	2008 CG_{42}	—	February 2, 2008	Catalina	CSS	·	5.8 km	MPC · JPL
249174	2008 CD_{45}	—	February 2, 2008	Kitt Peak	Spacewatch	·	3.3 km	MPC · JPL
249175	2008 CR_{50}	—	February 6, 2008	Catalina	CSS	·	3.7 km	MPC · JPL
249176	2008 CB_{53}	—	February 7, 2008	Kitt Peak	Spacewatch	·	3.5 km	MPC · JPL
249177	2008 CT_{63}	—	February 8, 2008	Mount Lemmon	Mount Lemmon Survey	ERI	2.1 km	MPC · JPL
249178	2008 CK_{101}	—	February 9, 2008	Kitt Peak	Spacewatch	·	5.6 km	MPC · JPL
249179	2008 CL_{107}	—	February 9, 2008	Mount Lemmon	Mount Lemmon Survey	THM	2.4 km	MPC · JPL
249180	2008 CE_{117}	—	February 12, 2008	Kitt Peak	Spacewatch	L5	15 km	MPC · JPL
249181	2008 CS_{117}	—	February 11, 2008	Dauban	Kugel, F.	EOS	2.6 km	MPC · JPL
249182	2008 CW_{119}	—	February 14, 2008	Grove Creek	Tozzi, F.	HIL · 3:2	7.2 km	MPC · JPL
249183	2008 CX_{119}	—	February 14, 2008	Grove Creek	Tozzi, F.	·	6.0 km	MPC · JPL
249184	2008 CH_{126}	—	February 8, 2008	Kitt Peak	Spacewatch	·	1.3 km	MPC · JPL
249185	2008 CG_{133}	—	February 8, 2008	Kitt Peak	Spacewatch	·	3.7 km	MPC · JPL
249186	2008 CW_{133}	—	February 8, 2008	Mount Lemmon	Mount Lemmon Survey	·	2.4 km	MPC · JPL
249187	2008 CB_{141}	—	February 8, 2008	Kitt Peak	Spacewatch	EUN	2.0 km	MPC · JPL
249188	2008 CZ_{148}	—	February 9, 2008	Mount Lemmon	Mount Lemmon Survey	·	2.8 km	MPC · JPL
249189	2008 CC_{158}	—	February 9, 2008	Catalina	CSS	(22805)	4.9 km	MPC · JPL
249190	2008 CZ_{165}	—	February 10, 2008	Mount Lemmon	Mount Lemmon Survey	ADE	3.3 km	MPC · JPL
249191	2008 CW_{178}	—	February 6, 2008	Catalina	CSS	EUP	6.0 km	MPC · JPL
249192	2008 CL_{185}	—	February 6, 2008	Mayhill	Lowe, A.	EUN	1.9 km	MPC · JPL
249193	2008 CK_{190}	—	February 3, 2008	Catalina	CSS	TIR	3.2 km	MPC · JPL
249194	2008 CP_{200}	—	February 10, 2008	Kitt Peak	Spacewatch	CYB	4.0 km	MPC · JPL
249195	2008 CY_{203}	—	February 13, 2008	Kitt Peak	Spacewatch	AGN	2.8 km	MPC · JPL
249196	2008 CM_{206}	—	February 9, 2008	Kitt Peak	Spacewatch	·	5.2 km	MPC · JPL
249197	2008 CC_{209}	—	February 1, 2008	Socorro	LINEAR	EOS	2.9 km	MPC · JPL
249198	2008 DB_{5}	—	February 24, 2008	Dauban	Kugel, F.	·	4.1 km	MPC · JPL
249199	2008 DF_{9}	—	February 25, 2008	Kitt Peak	Spacewatch	·	2.8 km	MPC · JPL
249200	2008 DN_{9}	—	February 25, 2008	Kitt Peak	Spacewatch	GEF	1.7 km	MPC · JPL

== 249201–249300 ==
back to top

Designation			Discovery			Properties		Ref
Permanent	Provisional	Named after	Date	Site	Discoverer(s)	Category	Diam.	Ref
249201	2008 DL_{13}	—	February 26, 2008	Mount Lemmon	Mount Lemmon Survey	·	3.1 km	MPC · JPL
249202	2008 DO_{31}	—	February 27, 2008	Anderson Mesa	LONEOS	·	3.4 km	MPC · JPL
249203	2008 DV_{36}	—	February 27, 2008	Mount Lemmon	Mount Lemmon Survey	·	3.1 km	MPC · JPL
249204	2008 DN_{39}	—	February 27, 2008	Mount Lemmon	Mount Lemmon Survey	·	2.9 km	MPC · JPL
249205	2008 DT_{39}	—	February 27, 2008	Mount Lemmon	Mount Lemmon Survey	HOF	4.0 km	MPC · JPL
249206	2008 DX_{45}	—	February 28, 2008	Catalina	CSS	·	6.1 km	MPC · JPL
249207	2008 DW_{48}	—	February 29, 2008	Catalina	CSS	·	4.3 km	MPC · JPL
249208	2008 DP_{59}	—	February 27, 2008	Mount Lemmon	Mount Lemmon Survey	·	4.2 km	MPC · JPL
249209	2008 DY_{59}	—	February 27, 2008	Catalina	CSS	·	4.0 km	MPC · JPL
249210	2008 DN_{67}	—	February 29, 2008	Kitt Peak	Spacewatch	CYB	5.2 km	MPC · JPL
249211	2008 DJ_{73}	—	February 27, 2008	Kitt Peak	Spacewatch	·	5.1 km	MPC · JPL
249212	2008 DL_{84}	—	February 18, 2008	Mount Lemmon	Mount Lemmon Survey	L5	13 km	MPC · JPL
249213	2008 DS_{87}	—	February 29, 2008	Kitt Peak	Spacewatch	·	3.2 km	MPC · JPL
249214	2008 EC	—	March 1, 2008	Desert Moon	Stevens, B. L.	·	2.5 km	MPC · JPL
249215	2008 EO_{19}	—	March 2, 2008	Kitt Peak	Spacewatch	fast	4.1 km	MPC · JPL
249216	2008 EU_{73}	—	March 7, 2008	Catalina	CSS	EOS	2.8 km	MPC · JPL
249217	2008 EB_{80}	—	March 9, 2008	Kitt Peak	Spacewatch	·	4.6 km	MPC · JPL
249218	2008 EO_{86}	—	March 7, 2008	Mount Lemmon	Mount Lemmon Survey	·	4.4 km	MPC · JPL
249219	2008 EB_{91}	—	March 1, 2008	Catalina	CSS	LUT	7.0 km	MPC · JPL
249220	2008 EV_{98}	—	March 3, 2008	Catalina	CSS	·	4.1 km	MPC · JPL
249221	2008 EZ_{99}	—	March 6, 2008	Catalina	CSS	·	8.2 km	MPC · JPL
249222	2008 ES_{103}	—	March 5, 2008	Mount Lemmon	Mount Lemmon Survey	·	4.0 km	MPC · JPL
249223	2008 EF_{105}	—	March 6, 2008	Mount Lemmon	Mount Lemmon Survey	·	3.1 km	MPC · JPL
249224	2008 EB_{136}	—	March 11, 2008	Kitt Peak	Spacewatch	·	5.0 km	MPC · JPL
249225	2008 FJ_{69}	—	March 28, 2008	Mount Lemmon	Mount Lemmon Survey	L5	12 km	MPC · JPL
249226	2008 FF_{100}	—	March 30, 2008	Kitt Peak	Spacewatch	·	4.5 km	MPC · JPL
249227	2008 FZ_{120}	—	March 31, 2008	Mount Lemmon	Mount Lemmon Survey	HYG	4.3 km	MPC · JPL
249228	2008 GH_{4}	—	April 7, 2008	Grove Creek	Tozzi, F.	·	5.0 km	MPC · JPL
249229	2008 GC_{12}	—	April 3, 2008	Kitt Peak	Spacewatch	·	3.6 km	MPC · JPL
249230	2008 GZ_{21}	—	April 6, 2008	Catalina	CSS	·	650 m	MPC · JPL
249231	2008 GH_{77}	—	April 7, 2008	Kitt Peak	Spacewatch	·	4.1 km	MPC · JPL
249232	2008 GM_{93}	—	April 6, 2008	Mount Lemmon	Mount Lemmon Survey	·	6.2 km	MPC · JPL
249233	2008 GV_{95}	—	April 8, 2008	Kitt Peak	Spacewatch	·	3.7 km	MPC · JPL
249234	2008 GN_{100}	—	April 9, 2008	Kitt Peak	Spacewatch	·	5.2 km	MPC · JPL
249235	2008 GT_{114}	—	April 11, 2008	Kitt Peak	Spacewatch	LIX	6.1 km	MPC · JPL
249236	2008 GE_{122}	—	April 13, 2008	Kitt Peak	Spacewatch	L5	9.1 km	MPC · JPL
249237	2008 HJ_{10}	—	April 24, 2008	Mount Lemmon	Mount Lemmon Survey	L5	13 km	MPC · JPL
249238	2008 HO_{22}	—	April 26, 2008	Kitt Peak	Spacewatch	·	4.9 km	MPC · JPL
249239	2008 HS_{35}	—	April 29, 2008	Mount Lemmon	Mount Lemmon Survey	·	7.5 km	MPC · JPL
249240	2008 JK_{26}	—	May 13, 2008	Tiki	Teamo, N.	·	5.9 km	MPC · JPL
249241	2008 OU_{22}	—	July 29, 2008	Kitt Peak	Spacewatch	L4	10 km	MPC · JPL
249242	2008 PX_{19}	—	August 7, 2008	Kitt Peak	Spacewatch	·	3.0 km	MPC · JPL
249243	2008 QD_{5}	—	August 22, 2008	Kitt Peak	Spacewatch	HOF	4.0 km	MPC · JPL
249244	2008 QE_{13}	—	August 27, 2008	La Sagra	OAM	PAD	3.2 km	MPC · JPL
249245	2008 QO_{48}	—	August 24, 2008	Kitt Peak	Spacewatch	·	4.1 km	MPC · JPL
249246	2008 RS_{4}	—	September 2, 2008	Kitt Peak	Spacewatch	3:2 · SHU	5.0 km	MPC · JPL
249247	2008 RV_{9}	—	September 3, 2008	Kitt Peak	Spacewatch	L4	12 km	MPC · JPL
249248	2008 RC_{77}	—	September 6, 2008	Mount Lemmon	Mount Lemmon Survey	·	3.5 km	MPC · JPL
249249	2008 RA_{106}	—	September 6, 2008	Mount Lemmon	Mount Lemmon Survey	ADE · fast	4.1 km	MPC · JPL
249250	2008 RZ_{112}	—	September 5, 2008	Kitt Peak	Spacewatch	NEM	3.1 km	MPC · JPL
249251	2008 RO_{120}	—	September 9, 2008	Mount Lemmon	Mount Lemmon Survey	·	3.3 km	MPC · JPL
249252	2008 RD_{130}	—	September 4, 2008	Kitt Peak	Spacewatch	·	2.1 km	MPC · JPL
249253	2008 RC_{131}	—	September 9, 2008	Mount Lemmon	Mount Lemmon Survey	·	4.1 km	MPC · JPL
249254	2008 SK_{2}	—	September 22, 2008	Goodricke-Pigott	R. A. Tucker	DOR	3.5 km	MPC · JPL
249255	2008 SC_{35}	—	September 20, 2008	Kitt Peak	Spacewatch	HOF	5.0 km	MPC · JPL
249256	2008 SH_{38}	—	September 20, 2008	Kitt Peak	Spacewatch	L4 · ERY	12 km	MPC · JPL
249257	2008 SF_{53}	—	September 20, 2008	Mount Lemmon	Mount Lemmon Survey	·	2.9 km	MPC · JPL
249258	2008 SP_{53}	—	September 20, 2008	Mount Lemmon	Mount Lemmon Survey	L4	12 km	MPC · JPL
249259	2008 SA_{65}	—	September 21, 2008	Mount Lemmon	Mount Lemmon Survey	·	3.0 km	MPC · JPL
249260	2008 SQ_{68}	—	September 21, 2008	Kitt Peak	Spacewatch	·	3.6 km	MPC · JPL
249261	2008 SS_{72}	—	September 22, 2008	Catalina	CSS	EUP	7.1 km	MPC · JPL
249262	2008 SR_{76}	—	September 23, 2008	Mount Lemmon	Mount Lemmon Survey	·	3.0 km	MPC · JPL
249263	2008 SV_{81}	—	September 25, 2008	Sierra Stars	Tozzi, F.	·	4.9 km	MPC · JPL
249264	2008 SB_{98}	—	September 21, 2008	Kitt Peak	Spacewatch	·	3.4 km	MPC · JPL
249265	2008 SN_{103}	—	September 21, 2008	Mount Lemmon	Mount Lemmon Survey	·	3.9 km	MPC · JPL
249266	2008 SD_{127}	—	September 22, 2008	Kitt Peak	Spacewatch	T_{j} (2.99) · 3:2	4.8 km	MPC · JPL
249267	2008 SC_{128}	—	September 22, 2008	Kitt Peak	Spacewatch	HOF	3.4 km	MPC · JPL
249268	2008 ST_{129}	—	September 22, 2008	Kitt Peak	Spacewatch	·	4.0 km	MPC · JPL
249269	2008 SH_{159}	—	September 24, 2008	Socorro	LINEAR	·	4.2 km	MPC · JPL
249270	2008 SA_{167}	—	September 28, 2008	Socorro	LINEAR	·	5.7 km	MPC · JPL
249271	2008 SX_{184}	—	September 24, 2008	Kitt Peak	Spacewatch	·	4.6 km	MPC · JPL
249272	2008 SS_{187}	—	September 25, 2008	Kitt Peak	Spacewatch	HYG	4.0 km	MPC · JPL
249273	2008 SS_{197}	—	September 25, 2008	Kitt Peak	Spacewatch	VER	3.4 km	MPC · JPL
249274	2008 SH_{198}	—	September 25, 2008	Kitt Peak	Spacewatch	·	4.7 km	MPC · JPL
249275	2008 SU_{203}	—	September 26, 2008	Kitt Peak	Spacewatch	3:2	6.4 km	MPC · JPL
249276	2008 SY_{205}	—	September 26, 2008	Kitt Peak	Spacewatch	VER	4.7 km	MPC · JPL
249277	2008 SS_{224}	—	September 26, 2008	Kitt Peak	Spacewatch	·	3.1 km	MPC · JPL
249278	2008 SV_{254}	—	September 23, 2008	Kitt Peak	Spacewatch	·	2.8 km	MPC · JPL
249279	2008 SO_{262}	—	September 24, 2008	Kitt Peak	Spacewatch	·	3.4 km	MPC · JPL
249280	2008 SK_{267}	—	September 23, 2008	Kitt Peak	Spacewatch	·	3.2 km	MPC · JPL
249281	2008 SV_{282}	—	September 24, 2008	Kitt Peak	Spacewatch	PAD	3.2 km	MPC · JPL
249282	2008 SR_{283}	—	September 23, 2008	Catalina	CSS	·	5.3 km	MPC · JPL
249283	2008 SM_{299}	—	September 22, 2008	Kitt Peak	Spacewatch	·	2.7 km	MPC · JPL
249284	2008 SF_{300}	—	September 22, 2008	Kitt Peak	Spacewatch	3:2 · SHU	6.5 km	MPC · JPL
249285	2008 SP_{304}	—	September 24, 2008	Kitt Peak	Spacewatch	·	1.5 km	MPC · JPL
249286	2008 TB_{5}	—	October 1, 2008	La Sagra	OAM	·	2.9 km	MPC · JPL
249287	2008 TG_{27}	—	October 8, 2008	Catalina	CSS	·	4.7 km	MPC · JPL
249288	2008 TP_{31}	—	October 1, 2008	Kitt Peak	Spacewatch	·	3.2 km	MPC · JPL
249289	2008 TW_{53}	—	October 2, 2008	Kitt Peak	Spacewatch	·	3.8 km	MPC · JPL
249290	2008 TY_{64}	—	October 2, 2008	Catalina	CSS	·	6.2 km	MPC · JPL
249291	2008 TF_{73}	—	October 2, 2008	Kitt Peak	Spacewatch	·	1.9 km	MPC · JPL
249292	2008 TF_{103}	—	October 6, 2008	Kitt Peak	Spacewatch	·	1.8 km	MPC · JPL
249293	2008 TG_{111}	—	October 6, 2008	Catalina	CSS	LIX	5.7 km	MPC · JPL
249294	2008 TC_{118}	—	October 6, 2008	Kitt Peak	Spacewatch	·	7.0 km	MPC · JPL
249295	2008 TS_{122}	—	October 7, 2008	Kitt Peak	Spacewatch	·	4.3 km	MPC · JPL
249296	2008 TA_{132}	—	October 8, 2008	Mount Lemmon	Mount Lemmon Survey	·	2.8 km	MPC · JPL
249297	2008 TL_{169}	—	October 7, 2008	Mount Lemmon	Mount Lemmon Survey	·	5.2 km	MPC · JPL
249298	2008 TR_{170}	—	October 9, 2008	Mount Lemmon	Mount Lemmon Survey	·	2.7 km	MPC · JPL
249299	2008 TB_{177}	—	October 7, 2008	Catalina	CSS	EMA	4.5 km	MPC · JPL
249300 Karenmortfield	2008 UY	Karenmortfield	October 18, 2008	Auberry	Auberry	·	2.4 km	MPC · JPL

== 249301–249400 ==
back to top

Designation			Discovery			Properties		Ref
Permanent	Provisional	Named after	Date	Site	Discoverer(s)	Category	Diam.	Ref
249301	2008 UD_{5}	—	October 24, 2008	Needville	J. Dellinger	·	4.2 km	MPC · JPL
249302 Ajoie	2008 UM_{7}	Ajoie	October 26, 2008	Vicques	M. Ory	T_{j} (2.98)	7.0 km	MPC · JPL
249303	2008 UG_{39}	—	October 20, 2008	Kitt Peak	Spacewatch	·	1.5 km	MPC · JPL
249304	2008 UD_{42}	—	October 20, 2008	Kitt Peak	Spacewatch	·	4.3 km	MPC · JPL
249305	2008 UC_{62}	—	October 21, 2008	Kitt Peak	Spacewatch	·	3.1 km	MPC · JPL
249306	2008 UT_{74}	—	October 21, 2008	Kitt Peak	Spacewatch	·	1.8 km	MPC · JPL
249307	2008 UE_{77}	—	October 21, 2008	Mount Lemmon	Mount Lemmon Survey	·	5.1 km	MPC · JPL
249308	2008 UQ_{77}	—	October 21, 2008	Kitt Peak	Spacewatch	·	2.1 km	MPC · JPL
249309	2008 UF_{83}	—	October 22, 2008	Mount Lemmon	Mount Lemmon Survey	HYG	2.9 km	MPC · JPL
249310	2008 UO_{125}	—	October 22, 2008	Kitt Peak	Spacewatch	·	5.6 km	MPC · JPL
249311	2008 UM_{128}	—	October 22, 2008	Kitt Peak	Spacewatch	CYB	5.7 km	MPC · JPL
249312	2008 UX_{164}	—	October 24, 2008	Kitt Peak	Spacewatch	·	4.0 km	MPC · JPL
249313	2008 UK_{168}	—	October 24, 2008	Kitt Peak	Spacewatch	·	5.1 km	MPC · JPL
249314	2008 UO_{169}	—	October 24, 2008	Kitt Peak	Spacewatch	·	3.1 km	MPC · JPL
249315	2008 UX_{174}	—	October 24, 2008	Kitt Peak	Spacewatch	·	5.0 km	MPC · JPL
249316	2008 UF_{185}	—	October 24, 2008	Kitt Peak	Spacewatch	·	3.5 km	MPC · JPL
249317	2008 UE_{201}	—	October 28, 2008	Socorro	LINEAR	·	3.6 km	MPC · JPL
249318	2008 UH_{201}	—	October 28, 2008	Socorro	LINEAR	·	3.0 km	MPC · JPL
249319	2008 UN_{201}	—	October 28, 2008	Socorro	LINEAR	·	4.7 km	MPC · JPL
249320	2008 UR_{202}	—	October 27, 2008	Socorro	LINEAR	·	5.3 km	MPC · JPL
249321	2008 UO_{215}	—	October 24, 2008	Catalina	CSS	·	3.9 km	MPC · JPL
249322	2008 UZ_{217}	—	October 25, 2008	Kitt Peak	Spacewatch	·	6.8 km	MPC · JPL
249323	2008 UJ_{225}	—	October 25, 2008	Kitt Peak	Spacewatch	·	5.7 km	MPC · JPL
249324	2008 UR_{259}	—	October 27, 2008	Kitt Peak	Spacewatch	3:2 · SHU	5.7 km	MPC · JPL
249325	2008 UA_{273}	—	October 28, 2008	Kitt Peak	Spacewatch	·	2.5 km	MPC · JPL
249326	2008 UU_{316}	—	October 30, 2008	Mount Lemmon	Mount Lemmon Survey	TRE	3.8 km	MPC · JPL
249327	2008 UC_{317}	—	October 30, 2008	Kitt Peak	Spacewatch	·	5.1 km	MPC · JPL
249328	2008 UK_{325}	—	October 31, 2008	Kitt Peak	Spacewatch	HYG	4.1 km	MPC · JPL
249329	2008 UU_{340}	—	October 24, 2008	Kitt Peak	Spacewatch	·	4.2 km	MPC · JPL
249330	2008 UZ_{340}	—	October 24, 2008	Mount Lemmon	Mount Lemmon Survey	·	3.2 km	MPC · JPL
249331	2008 UB_{355}	—	October 31, 2008	Kitt Peak	Spacewatch	·	3.4 km	MPC · JPL
249332	2008 UB_{359}	—	October 27, 2008	Mount Lemmon	Mount Lemmon Survey	·	5.2 km	MPC · JPL
249333	2008 UK_{359}	—	October 27, 2008	Mount Lemmon	Mount Lemmon Survey	·	3.7 km	MPC · JPL
249334	2008 UM_{365}	—	October 30, 2008	Catalina	CSS	·	3.8 km	MPC · JPL
249335	2008 VL_{2}	—	November 2, 2008	Socorro	LINEAR	·	5.1 km	MPC · JPL
249336	2008 VQ_{2}	—	November 2, 2008	Socorro	LINEAR	·	4.6 km	MPC · JPL
249337	2008 VF_{3}	—	November 3, 2008	Socorro	LINEAR	·	6.1 km	MPC · JPL
249338	2008 VT_{23}	—	November 1, 2008	Kitt Peak	Spacewatch	SYL · CYB	7.7 km	MPC · JPL
249339	2008 VG_{64}	—	November 9, 2008	La Sagra	OAM	·	6.9 km	MPC · JPL
249340	2008 VH_{74}	—	November 7, 2008	Catalina	CSS	·	6.6 km	MPC · JPL
249341	2008 WH_{4}	—	November 17, 2008	Kitt Peak	Spacewatch	·	4.2 km	MPC · JPL
249342	2008 WM_{23}	—	November 18, 2008	Catalina	CSS	·	4.1 km	MPC · JPL
249343	2008 WQ_{32}	—	November 20, 2008	Mayhill	Lowe, A.	·	5.8 km	MPC · JPL
249344	2008 WC_{60}	—	November 19, 2008	Socorro	LINEAR	·	3.8 km	MPC · JPL
249345	2008 WU_{61}	—	November 22, 2008	La Sagra	OAM	PHO	2.2 km	MPC · JPL
249346	2008 WV_{61}	—	November 22, 2008	La Sagra	OAM	·	2.9 km	MPC · JPL
249347	2008 WE_{64}	—	November 18, 2008	Catalina	CSS	·	6.4 km	MPC · JPL
249348	2008 WR_{97}	—	November 19, 2008	Catalina	CSS	(3025)	5.8 km	MPC · JPL
249349	2008 WX_{101}	—	November 30, 2008	Socorro	LINEAR	·	3.1 km	MPC · JPL
249350	2008 WL_{113}	—	November 30, 2008	Kitt Peak	Spacewatch	·	6.4 km	MPC · JPL
249351	2008 WC_{140}	—	November 17, 2008	Kitt Peak	Spacewatch	URS	7.8 km	MPC · JPL
249352	2008 XS_{3}	—	December 2, 2008	Socorro	LINEAR	GEF	4.3 km	MPC · JPL
249353	2008 YM_{3}	—	December 21, 2008	Dauban	Kugel, F.	·	4.9 km	MPC · JPL
249354	2008 YX_{7}	—	December 22, 2008	Bisei SG Center	BATTeRS	·	3.2 km	MPC · JPL
249355	2008 YD_{30}	—	December 30, 2008	Mayhill	Lowe, A.	·	4.3 km	MPC · JPL
249356	2008 YZ_{31}	—	December 30, 2008	Bisei SG Center	BATTeRS	PHO	2.2 km	MPC · JPL
249357	2008 YW_{34}	—	December 31, 2008	Catalina	CSS	PHO	1.5 km	MPC · JPL
249358	2008 YQ_{36}	—	December 22, 2008	Kitt Peak	Spacewatch	·	1.6 km	MPC · JPL
249359	2008 YK_{38}	—	December 29, 2008	Kitt Peak	Spacewatch	·	3.0 km	MPC · JPL
249360	2008 YW_{40}	—	December 30, 2008	Mount Lemmon	Mount Lemmon Survey	·	3.8 km	MPC · JPL
249361	2008 YM_{89}	—	December 29, 2008	Kitt Peak	Spacewatch	·	3.2 km	MPC · JPL
249362	2008 YR_{137}	—	December 30, 2008	Mount Lemmon	Mount Lemmon Survey	·	3.7 km	MPC · JPL
249363	2008 YG_{142}	—	December 30, 2008	Kitt Peak	Spacewatch	·	2.8 km	MPC · JPL
249364	2008 YN_{153}	—	December 21, 2008	Kitt Peak	Spacewatch	·	2.3 km	MPC · JPL
249365	2008 YP_{163}	—	December 30, 2008	Mount Lemmon	Mount Lemmon Survey	HOF	4.6 km	MPC · JPL
249366	2008 YY_{168}	—	December 21, 2008	Mount Lemmon	Mount Lemmon Survey	·	3.3 km	MPC · JPL
249367	2008 YD_{171}	—	December 22, 2008	Kitt Peak	Spacewatch	·	990 m	MPC · JPL
249368	2009 AX_{1}	—	January 4, 2009	Farra d'Isonzo	Farra d'Isonzo	·	4.3 km	MPC · JPL
249369	2009 AC_{8}	—	January 1, 2009	Mount Lemmon	Mount Lemmon Survey	EUN	2.8 km	MPC · JPL
249370	2009 AV_{47}	—	January 3, 2009	Mount Lemmon	Mount Lemmon Survey	·	1.8 km	MPC · JPL
249371	2009 AR_{50}	—	January 15, 2009	Kitt Peak	Spacewatch	·	1.1 km	MPC · JPL
249372	2009 BX_{1}	—	January 18, 2009	Mayhill	Lowe, A.	·	5.6 km	MPC · JPL
249373	2009 BY_{1}	—	January 18, 2009	Mayhill	Lowe, A.	·	1.1 km	MPC · JPL
249374	2009 BC_{3}	—	January 18, 2009	Socorro	LINEAR	EUP	7.7 km	MPC · JPL
249375	2009 BK_{3}	—	January 18, 2009	Socorro	LINEAR	·	3.2 km	MPC · JPL
249376	2009 BM_{6}	—	January 18, 2009	Socorro	LINEAR	(883)	1.0 km	MPC · JPL
249377	2009 BV_{10}	—	January 25, 2009	Mayhill	Lowe, A.	·	4.4 km	MPC · JPL
249378	2009 BJ_{16}	—	January 16, 2009	Mount Lemmon	Mount Lemmon Survey	·	2.0 km	MPC · JPL
249379	2009 BO_{32}	—	January 16, 2009	Kitt Peak	Spacewatch	HOF	2.6 km	MPC · JPL
249380	2009 BZ_{44}	—	January 16, 2009	Kitt Peak	Spacewatch	ERI	2.1 km	MPC · JPL
249381	2009 BJ_{46}	—	January 16, 2009	Kitt Peak	Spacewatch	·	3.5 km	MPC · JPL
249382	2009 BU_{49}	—	January 16, 2009	Mount Lemmon	Mount Lemmon Survey	·	1.4 km	MPC · JPL
249383	2009 BF_{67}	—	January 20, 2009	Kitt Peak	Spacewatch	VER	3.8 km	MPC · JPL
249384	2009 BH_{67}	—	January 20, 2009	Kitt Peak	Spacewatch	V	830 m	MPC · JPL
249385	2009 BV_{68}	—	January 25, 2009	Kitt Peak	Spacewatch	(194)	3.1 km	MPC · JPL
249386	2009 BU_{75}	—	January 24, 2009	Purple Mountain	PMO NEO Survey Program	·	6.1 km	MPC · JPL
249387	2009 BN_{76}	—	January 26, 2009	Purple Mountain	PMO NEO Survey Program	PHO	1.9 km	MPC · JPL
249388	2009 BB_{85}	—	January 25, 2009	Kitt Peak	Spacewatch	·	1.7 km	MPC · JPL
249389	2009 BO_{88}	—	January 25, 2009	Kitt Peak	Spacewatch	HOF	3.5 km	MPC · JPL
249390	2009 BJ_{96}	—	January 24, 2009	Purple Mountain	PMO NEO Survey Program	JUN	3.3 km	MPC · JPL
249391	2009 BU_{108}	—	January 29, 2009	Mount Lemmon	Mount Lemmon Survey	3:2	6.4 km	MPC · JPL
249392	2009 BX_{112}	—	January 31, 2009	Mount Lemmon	Mount Lemmon Survey	·	3.6 km	MPC · JPL
249393	2009 BR_{113}	—	January 26, 2009	Kitt Peak	Spacewatch	(116763)	1.8 km	MPC · JPL
249394	2009 BD_{115}	—	January 27, 2009	Piszkéstető	K. Sárneczky	·	4.4 km	MPC · JPL
249395	2009 BG_{118}	—	January 30, 2009	Mount Lemmon	Mount Lemmon Survey	THM	3.8 km	MPC · JPL
249396	2009 BF_{122}	—	January 31, 2009	Kitt Peak	Spacewatch	·	5.7 km	MPC · JPL
249397	2009 BB_{125}	—	January 31, 2009	Kitt Peak	Spacewatch	CYB	6.3 km	MPC · JPL
249398	2009 BP_{150}	—	January 27, 2009	Purple Mountain	PMO NEO Survey Program	·	1.1 km	MPC · JPL
249399	2009 BN_{187}	—	January 30, 2009	Mount Lemmon	Mount Lemmon Survey	·	3.1 km	MPC · JPL
249400	2009 BZ_{187}	—	January 20, 2009	Catalina	CSS	·	5.1 km	MPC · JPL

== 249401–249500 ==
back to top

Designation			Discovery			Properties		Ref
Permanent	Provisional	Named after	Date	Site	Discoverer(s)	Category	Diam.	Ref
249401	2009 BV_{189}	—	January 25, 2009	Kitt Peak	Spacewatch	·	1.5 km	MPC · JPL
249402	2009 CZ_{12}	—	February 1, 2009	Mount Lemmon	Mount Lemmon Survey	·	5.2 km	MPC · JPL
249403	2009 CM_{15}	—	February 3, 2009	Kitt Peak	Spacewatch	·	1.1 km	MPC · JPL
249404	2009 CE_{20}	—	February 1, 2009	Kitt Peak	Spacewatch	·	4.6 km	MPC · JPL
249405	2009 CB_{42}	—	February 13, 2009	Kitt Peak	Spacewatch	·	2.4 km	MPC · JPL
249406	2009 CT_{53}	—	February 2, 2009	Siding Spring	SSS	·	4.3 km	MPC · JPL
249407	2009 CY_{56}	—	February 5, 2009	Catalina	CSS	·	6.5 km	MPC · JPL
249408	2009 CP_{59}	—	February 5, 2009	Mount Lemmon	Mount Lemmon Survey	·	2.8 km	MPC · JPL
249409	2009 CG_{65}	—	February 3, 2009	Kitt Peak	Spacewatch	·	1.7 km	MPC · JPL
249410	2009 DX_{5}	—	February 16, 2009	Catalina	CSS	·	5.4 km	MPC · JPL
249411	2009 DR_{6}	—	February 17, 2009	Kitt Peak	Spacewatch	·	4.5 km	MPC · JPL
249412	2009 DH_{12}	—	February 20, 2009	Catalina	CSS	EUP	5.8 km	MPC · JPL
249413	2009 DA_{36}	—	February 20, 2009	Kitt Peak	Spacewatch	·	1.8 km	MPC · JPL
249414	2009 DC_{47}	—	February 28, 2009	Socorro	LINEAR	T_{j} (2.99) · EUP	6.3 km	MPC · JPL
249415	2009 DL_{69}	—	February 26, 2009	Catalina	CSS	·	1.7 km	MPC · JPL
249416	2009 DN_{69}	—	February 26, 2009	Catalina	CSS	3:2	7.5 km	MPC · JPL
249417	2009 DQ_{90}	—	February 26, 2009	Catalina	CSS	·	2.7 km	MPC · JPL
249418	2009 DU_{103}	—	February 26, 2009	Mount Lemmon	Mount Lemmon Survey	DOR	3.8 km	MPC · JPL
249419	2009 DO_{104}	—	February 26, 2009	Kitt Peak	Spacewatch	·	1.1 km	MPC · JPL
249420	2009 DV_{109}	—	February 19, 2009	Catalina	CSS	·	1.4 km	MPC · JPL
249421	2009 DA_{122}	—	February 27, 2009	Kitt Peak	Spacewatch	·	1.6 km	MPC · JPL
249422	2009 DY_{129}	—	February 27, 2009	Kitt Peak	Spacewatch	·	1.9 km	MPC · JPL
249423	2009 DJ_{136}	—	February 19, 2009	Kitt Peak	Spacewatch	·	5.2 km	MPC · JPL
249424	2009 DT_{140}	—	February 19, 2009	Mount Lemmon	Mount Lemmon Survey	·	3.9 km	MPC · JPL
249425	2009 ER_{3}	—	March 14, 2009	La Sagra	OAM	·	960 m	MPC · JPL
249426	2009 EZ_{3}	—	March 15, 2009	La Sagra	OAM	·	1.9 km	MPC · JPL
249427	2009 EH_{18}	—	March 15, 2009	Kitt Peak	Spacewatch	CLA	2.2 km	MPC · JPL
249428	2009 EP_{22}	—	March 2, 2009	Mount Lemmon	Mount Lemmon Survey	SYL · CYB	6.0 km	MPC · JPL
249429	2009 EG_{23}	—	March 7, 2009	Mount Lemmon	Mount Lemmon Survey	·	3.9 km	MPC · JPL
249430	2009 EJ_{27}	—	March 1, 2009	Kitt Peak	Spacewatch	·	1.6 km	MPC · JPL
249431	2009 EK_{28}	—	March 2, 2009	Mount Lemmon	Mount Lemmon Survey	·	4.1 km	MPC · JPL
249432	2009 FU_{5}	—	March 18, 2009	La Cañada	Lacruz, J.	·	1.5 km	MPC · JPL
249433	2009 FA_{6}	—	March 16, 2009	Kitt Peak	Spacewatch	·	3.4 km	MPC · JPL
249434	2009 FN_{16}	—	March 19, 2009	Kitt Peak	Spacewatch	(895)	7.8 km	MPC · JPL
249435	2009 FG_{18}	—	March 19, 2009	Socorro	LINEAR	T_{j} (2.99) · EUP	5.6 km	MPC · JPL
249436	2009 FL_{31}	—	March 25, 2009	La Sagra	OAM	(8737)	5.7 km	MPC · JPL
249437	2009 FR_{43}	—	March 29, 2009	Socorro	LINEAR	·	3.0 km	MPC · JPL
249438	2009 FT_{45}	—	March 30, 2009	Cordell-Lorenz	D. T. Durig	·	6.7 km	MPC · JPL
249439	2009 FT_{52}	—	March 29, 2009	Kitt Peak	Spacewatch	·	1.5 km	MPC · JPL
249440	2009 FX_{52}	—	March 29, 2009	Kitt Peak	Spacewatch	·	2.2 km	MPC · JPL
249441	2009 FL_{57}	—	March 26, 2009	Kitt Peak	Spacewatch	·	2.7 km	MPC · JPL
249442	2009 FO_{57}	—	March 19, 2009	Kitt Peak	Spacewatch	HYG	3.6 km	MPC · JPL
249443	2009 FZ_{61}	—	March 19, 2009	Kitt Peak	Spacewatch	THM	2.7 km	MPC · JPL
249444	2009 FS_{64}	—	March 16, 2009	Kitt Peak	Spacewatch	·	3.5 km	MPC · JPL
249445	2009 FE_{68}	—	March 28, 2009	Kitt Peak	Spacewatch	·	3.8 km	MPC · JPL
249446	2009 FS_{68}	—	March 19, 2009	Mount Lemmon	Mount Lemmon Survey	·	8.0 km	MPC · JPL
249447	2009 FN_{69}	—	March 17, 2009	Kitt Peak	Spacewatch	EOS	3.7 km	MPC · JPL
249448	2009 FU_{69}	—	March 18, 2009	Kitt Peak	Spacewatch	·	4.6 km	MPC · JPL
249449	2009 GA_{4}	—	April 13, 2009	Kanab	Sheridan, E.	HYG	5.1 km	MPC · JPL
249450	2009 HF_{5}	—	April 17, 2009	Kitt Peak	Spacewatch	·	2.2 km	MPC · JPL
249451	2009 HL_{5}	—	April 17, 2009	Kitt Peak	Spacewatch	·	2.4 km	MPC · JPL
249452	2009 HV_{20}	—	April 20, 2009	Tzec Maun	Tozzi, F.	JUN	1.9 km	MPC · JPL
249453	2009 HD_{39}	—	April 18, 2009	Kitt Peak	Spacewatch	·	2.7 km	MPC · JPL
249454	2009 HH_{41}	—	April 20, 2009	Kitt Peak	Spacewatch	URS	5.1 km	MPC · JPL
249455	2009 HQ_{41}	—	April 20, 2009	Kitt Peak	Spacewatch	·	4.0 km	MPC · JPL
249456	2009 HC_{52}	—	April 17, 2009	Catalina	CSS	·	2.5 km	MPC · JPL
249457	2009 HF_{59}	—	April 20, 2009	Socorro	LINEAR	·	1.9 km	MPC · JPL
249458	2009 HC_{65}	—	April 23, 2009	Kitt Peak	Spacewatch	·	4.8 km	MPC · JPL
249459	2009 HT_{81}	—	April 24, 2009	Cerro Burek	Burek, Cerro	·	3.0 km	MPC · JPL
249460	2009 HZ_{84}	—	April 28, 2009	Mount Lemmon	Mount Lemmon Survey	NYS	1.8 km	MPC · JPL
249461	2009 HM_{91}	—	April 27, 2009	Catalina	CSS	·	3.8 km	MPC · JPL
249462	2009 HF_{93}	—	April 30, 2009	Kitt Peak	Spacewatch	·	3.4 km	MPC · JPL
249463	2009 HV_{96}	—	April 30, 2009	Kitt Peak	Spacewatch	·	4.8 km	MPC · JPL
249464	2009 HH_{97}	—	April 17, 2009	Kitt Peak	Spacewatch	·	3.9 km	MPC · JPL
249465	2009 HV_{102}	—	April 29, 2009	Purple Mountain	PMO NEO Survey Program	L5	11 km	MPC · JPL
249466	2009 HV_{103}	—	April 20, 2009	Kitt Peak	Spacewatch	·	2.2 km	MPC · JPL
249467	2009 HS_{105}	—	April 29, 2009	Kitt Peak	Spacewatch	HYG	3.9 km	MPC · JPL
249468	2009 JG_{3}	—	May 13, 2009	Mount Lemmon	Mount Lemmon Survey	·	4.8 km	MPC · JPL
249469	2009 JL_{5}	—	May 14, 2009	Kitt Peak	Spacewatch	·	4.3 km	MPC · JPL
249470	2009 JA_{13}	—	May 2, 2009	La Sagra	OAM	·	4.8 km	MPC · JPL
249471	2009 KM_{5}	—	May 24, 2009	Catalina	CSS	·	4.3 km	MPC · JPL
249472	2009 KV_{5}	—	May 25, 2009	Kitt Peak	Spacewatch	·	2.6 km	MPC · JPL
249473	2009 KS_{10}	—	May 25, 2009	Kitt Peak	Spacewatch	·	5.1 km	MPC · JPL
249474	2009 KB_{21}	—	May 29, 2009	Mount Lemmon	Mount Lemmon Survey	·	3.0 km	MPC · JPL
249475	2009 KL_{23}	—	May 27, 2009	Kitt Peak	Spacewatch	EOS	3.3 km	MPC · JPL
249476	2009 LS_{6}	—	June 15, 2009	Kitt Peak	Spacewatch	L5	15 km	MPC · JPL
249477	2009 OJ_{1}	—	July 18, 2009	Sandlot	G. Hug	·	3.2 km	MPC · JPL
249478	2009 ON_{3}	—	July 17, 2009	La Sagra	OAM	·	6.5 km	MPC · JPL
249479	2009 TN_{7}	—	October 13, 2009	La Sagra	OAM	·	4.3 km	MPC · JPL
249480	2009 TX_{17}	—	October 15, 2009	Catalina	CSS	AEG	6.5 km	MPC · JPL
249481	2009 TE_{23}	—	October 14, 2009	La Sagra	OAM	L4 · ERY	14 km	MPC · JPL
249482	2009 TZ_{27}	—	October 15, 2009	La Sagra	OAM	EOS	3.7 km	MPC · JPL
249483	2009 UU_{26}	—	October 21, 2009	Catalina	CSS	·	4.7 km	MPC · JPL
249484	2009 UL_{32}	—	October 18, 2009	Mount Lemmon	Mount Lemmon Survey	·	3.2 km	MPC · JPL
249485	2009 UP_{37}	—	October 22, 2009	Mount Lemmon	Mount Lemmon Survey	·	3.8 km	MPC · JPL
249486	2009 UO_{69}	—	October 21, 2009	Catalina	CSS	L4	12 km	MPC · JPL
249487	2009 UP_{87}	—	October 24, 2009	Kitt Peak	Spacewatch	ADE	3.6 km	MPC · JPL
249488	2009 UN_{129}	—	October 26, 2009	Mount Lemmon	Mount Lemmon Survey	ADE	4.2 km	MPC · JPL
249489	2009 UN_{131}	—	October 19, 2009	La Sagra	OAM	·	3.1 km	MPC · JPL
249490	2009 UV_{136}	—	October 25, 2009	Catalina	CSS	·	3.7 km	MPC · JPL
249491	2009 UH_{149}	—	October 23, 2009	La Sagra	OAM	·	2.8 km	MPC · JPL
249492	2009 VW_{26}	—	November 8, 2009	Kitt Peak	Spacewatch	VER	4.2 km	MPC · JPL
249493	2009 VF_{32}	—	November 9, 2009	Kitt Peak	Spacewatch	(5)	2.4 km	MPC · JPL
249494	2009 VV_{44}	—	November 15, 2009	Mount Lemmon	Mount Lemmon Survey	T_{j} (2.96)	6.7 km	MPC · JPL
249495	2009 VO_{116}	—	November 15, 2009	Mount Lemmon	Mount Lemmon Survey	·	3.8 km	MPC · JPL
249496	2009 WR_{249}	—	November 26, 2009	Kitt Peak	Spacewatch	·	2.3 km	MPC · JPL
249497	2009 XN_{15}	—	December 15, 2009	Mount Lemmon	Mount Lemmon Survey	·	2.9 km	MPC · JPL
249498	2009 XU_{15}	—	December 15, 2009	Mount Lemmon	Mount Lemmon Survey	·	2.8 km	MPC · JPL
249499	2009 XV_{18}	—	December 15, 2009	Mount Lemmon	Mount Lemmon Survey	·	5.8 km	MPC · JPL
249500	2009 XL_{22}	—	December 15, 2009	Mount Lemmon	Mount Lemmon Survey	·	5.0 km	MPC · JPL

== 249501–249600 ==
back to top

Designation			Discovery			Properties		Ref
Permanent	Provisional	Named after	Date	Site	Discoverer(s)	Category	Diam.	Ref
249501	2009 YY_{3}	—	December 17, 2009	Kitt Peak	Spacewatch	·	800 m	MPC · JPL
249502	2009 YL_{16}	—	December 19, 2009	Mount Lemmon	Mount Lemmon Survey	EUN	2.1 km	MPC · JPL
249503	2009 YW_{20}	—	December 27, 2009	Kitt Peak	Spacewatch	·	4.3 km	MPC · JPL
249504	2009 YB_{25}	—	December 20, 2009	Kitt Peak	Spacewatch	HYG	4.1 km	MPC · JPL
249505	2010 AG_{6}	—	January 6, 2010	Kitt Peak	Spacewatch	DOR	3.7 km	MPC · JPL
249506	2010 AK_{34}	—	January 7, 2010	Kitt Peak	Spacewatch	(21344)	2.1 km	MPC · JPL
249507	2010 AD_{54}	—	January 8, 2010	Kitt Peak	Spacewatch	·	2.4 km	MPC · JPL
249508	2010 AE_{55}	—	January 8, 2010	Kitt Peak	Spacewatch	·	2.3 km	MPC · JPL
249509	2010 AR_{61}	—	January 12, 2010	Socorro	LINEAR	·	3.3 km	MPC · JPL
249510	2010 AT_{65}	—	January 11, 2010	Kitt Peak	Spacewatch	·	2.3 km	MPC · JPL
249511	2010 AA_{76}	—	January 12, 2010	Socorro	LINEAR	·	6.4 km	MPC · JPL
249512	2010 AT_{76}	—	January 6, 2010	Catalina	CSS	·	6.1 km	MPC · JPL
249513	2010 CD_{41}	—	February 13, 2010	Kitt Peak	Spacewatch	·	5.4 km	MPC · JPL
249514 Donaldroyer	2010 CZ_{44}	Donaldroyer	February 11, 2010	WISE	WISE	·	3.1 km	MPC · JPL
249515 Heinrichsen	2010 CF_{48}	Heinrichsen	February 12, 2010	WISE	WISE	ADE	3.1 km	MPC · JPL
249516 Aretha	2010 CV_{60}	Aretha	February 15, 2010	WISE	WISE	VER	4.3 km	MPC · JPL
249517	2010 CM_{62}	—	February 9, 2010	Catalina	CSS	EOS	3.2 km	MPC · JPL
249518	2010 CO_{70}	—	February 13, 2010	Mount Lemmon	Mount Lemmon Survey	·	5.0 km	MPC · JPL
249519 Whitneyclavin	2010 CA_{130}	Whitneyclavin	February 11, 2010	WISE	WISE	·	3.1 km	MPC · JPL
249520 Luppino	2010 CG_{181}	Luppino	February 14, 2010	Haleakala	Pan-STARRS 1	CYB	4.2 km	MPC · JPL
249521 Truth	2010 CU_{212}	Truth	February 6, 2010	WISE	WISE	·	4.7 km	MPC · JPL
249522 Johndailey	2010 DP_{15}	Johndailey	February 16, 2010	WISE	WISE	ADE	3.9 km	MPC · JPL
249523 Friedan	2010 DO_{53}	Friedan	February 22, 2010	WISE	WISE	T_{j} (2.99) · EUP	5.4 km	MPC · JPL
249524	2010 ED_{34}	—	March 5, 2010	Kitt Peak	Spacewatch	·	3.3 km	MPC · JPL
249525	2010 FM_{55}	—	March 25, 2010	Kitt Peak	Spacewatch	·	2.1 km	MPC · JPL
249526	2010 FY_{84}	—	March 19, 2010	Mount Lemmon	Mount Lemmon Survey	HOF	2.9 km	MPC · JPL
249527	2010 FQ_{91}	—	March 25, 2010	Kitt Peak	Spacewatch	·	2.6 km	MPC · JPL
249528	2010 GS_{29}	—	April 8, 2010	Purple Mountain	PMO NEO Survey Program	·	2.8 km	MPC · JPL
249529	2010 GE_{31}	—	April 4, 2010	Kitt Peak	Spacewatch	·	2.1 km	MPC · JPL
249530 Ericrice	2010 GJ_{92}	Ericrice	April 14, 2010	WISE	WISE	·	1.9 km	MPC · JPL
249531	2010 GV_{117}	—	April 10, 2010	Mount Lemmon	Mount Lemmon Survey	·	4.4 km	MPC · JPL
249532	2010 GN_{120}	—	April 11, 2010	Kitt Peak	Spacewatch	·	2.4 km	MPC · JPL
249533	2010 GX_{125}	—	April 9, 2010	Kitt Peak	Spacewatch	NEM	2.7 km	MPC · JPL
249534	2010 GY_{132}	—	April 10, 2010	Kitt Peak	Spacewatch	·	5.4 km	MPC · JPL
249535	2010 GD_{135}	—	April 4, 2010	Kitt Peak	Spacewatch	·	3.9 km	MPC · JPL
249536	2010 GF_{156}	—	April 9, 2010	Catalina	CSS	·	5.1 km	MPC · JPL
249537	2010 GK_{157}	—	April 10, 2010	Kitt Peak	Spacewatch	·	2.8 km	MPC · JPL
249538	2010 GT_{161}	—	April 15, 2010	Kitt Peak	Spacewatch	·	5.7 km	MPC · JPL
249539 Pedrosevilla	2010 HY_{7}	Pedrosevilla	April 16, 2010	WISE	WISE	·	3.0 km	MPC · JPL
249540 Eugeniescott	2010 HX_{14}	Eugeniescott	April 18, 2010	WISE	WISE	·	5.2 km	MPC · JPL
249541 Steinem	2010 HR_{25}	Steinem	April 19, 2010	WISE	WISE	EOS	5.3 km	MPC · JPL
249542 Edwardyoung	2010 HS_{37}	Edwardyoung	April 21, 2010	WISE	WISE	·	2.9 km	MPC · JPL
249543	2010 HA_{40}	—	April 21, 2010	WISE	WISE	·	6.4 km	MPC · JPL
249544 Ianmclean	2010 HQ_{44}	Ianmclean	April 23, 2010	WISE	WISE	·	4.8 km	MPC · JPL
249545	2010 HB_{45}	—	April 23, 2010	WISE	WISE	L5	12 km	MPC · JPL
249546	2010 HE_{47}	—	April 23, 2010	WISE	WISE	JUN	1.5 km	MPC · JPL
249547	2010 HZ_{83}	—	April 28, 2010	WISE	WISE	·	1.6 km	MPC · JPL
249548	2010 HT_{107}	—	April 25, 2010	Kitt Peak	Spacewatch	·	2.4 km	MPC · JPL
249549	2010 JU_{33}	—	May 4, 2010	Catalina	CSS	·	2.7 km	MPC · JPL
249550	2010 JY_{39}	—	May 5, 2010	Mount Lemmon	Mount Lemmon Survey	DOR	3.6 km	MPC · JPL
249551	2010 JM_{72}	—	May 5, 2010	Mount Lemmon	Mount Lemmon Survey	·	5.1 km	MPC · JPL
249552	2010 JQ_{84}	—	May 5, 2010	Catalina	CSS	·	3.0 km	MPC · JPL
249553	2010 JV_{136}	—	May 14, 2010	WISE	WISE	·	4.8 km	MPC · JPL
249554	2010 JL_{150}	—	May 10, 2010	Mount Lemmon	Mount Lemmon Survey	·	4.1 km	MPC · JPL
249555	2010 JN_{168}	—	May 12, 2010	Kitt Peak	Spacewatch	·	3.9 km	MPC · JPL
249556	2010 KX_{29}	—	May 18, 2010	WISE	WISE	·	5.8 km	MPC · JPL
249557	2010 KW_{37}	—	May 17, 2010	Kitt Peak	Spacewatch	·	2.9 km	MPC · JPL
249558	2858 P-L	—	September 24, 1960	Palomar	C. J. van Houten, I. van Houten-Groeneveld, T. Gehrels	·	720 m	MPC · JPL
249559	3079 P-L	—	September 25, 1960	Palomar	C. J. van Houten, I. van Houten-Groeneveld, T. Gehrels	·	1.2 km	MPC · JPL
249560	4176 P-L	—	September 24, 1960	Palomar	C. J. van Houten, I. van Houten-Groeneveld, T. Gehrels	·	2.0 km	MPC · JPL
249561	4547 P-L	—	September 24, 1960	Palomar	C. J. van Houten, I. van Houten-Groeneveld, T. Gehrels	EUN	1.7 km	MPC · JPL
249562	5019 T-2	—	September 25, 1973	Palomar	C. J. van Houten, I. van Houten-Groeneveld, T. Gehrels	·	1.5 km	MPC · JPL
249563	2233 T-3	—	October 16, 1977	Palomar	C. J. van Houten, I. van Houten-Groeneveld, T. Gehrels	·	1.3 km	MPC · JPL
249564	2238 T-3	—	October 16, 1977	Palomar	C. J. van Houten, I. van Houten-Groeneveld, T. Gehrels	·	2.8 km	MPC · JPL
249565	2298 T-3	—	October 16, 1977	Palomar	C. J. van Houten, I. van Houten-Groeneveld, T. Gehrels	(5)	1.4 km	MPC · JPL
249566	3386 T-3	—	October 16, 1977	Palomar	C. J. van Houten, I. van Houten-Groeneveld, T. Gehrels	·	2.0 km	MPC · JPL
249567	5102 T-3	—	October 16, 1977	Palomar	C. J. van Houten, I. van Houten-Groeneveld, T. Gehrels	·	2.9 km	MPC · JPL
249568	1985 RX	—	September 14, 1985	Kitt Peak	Spacewatch	·	1.8 km	MPC · JPL
249569	1989 SL_{3}	—	September 26, 1989	La Silla	E. W. Elst	·	2.5 km	MPC · JPL
249570	1992 SV_{2}	—	September 24, 1992	Kitt Peak	Spacewatch	(12739)	2.6 km	MPC · JPL
249571	1993 TM_{30}	—	October 9, 1993	La Silla	E. W. Elst	·	2.0 km	MPC · JPL
249572	1994 RR_{18}	—	September 3, 1994	La Silla	E. W. Elst	·	5.4 km	MPC · JPL
249573	1994 RA_{25}	—	September 12, 1994	Xinglong	SCAP	EMA	5.0 km	MPC · JPL
249574	1994 UD_{10}	—	October 28, 1994	Kitt Peak	Spacewatch	·	3.3 km	MPC · JPL
249575	1995 BM_{10}	—	January 29, 1995	Kitt Peak	Spacewatch	(5)	1.8 km	MPC · JPL
249576	1995 FH_{2}	—	March 23, 1995	Kitt Peak	Spacewatch	·	3.5 km	MPC · JPL
249577	1995 SH_{16}	—	September 18, 1995	Kitt Peak	Spacewatch	·	2.7 km	MPC · JPL
249578	1995 SS_{24}	—	September 19, 1995	Kitt Peak	Spacewatch	·	1.5 km	MPC · JPL
249579	1995 SC_{27}	—	September 19, 1995	Kitt Peak	Spacewatch	·	1.8 km	MPC · JPL
249580	1995 SU_{34}	—	September 22, 1995	Kitt Peak	Spacewatch	·	2.2 km	MPC · JPL
249581	1995 SX_{87}	—	September 26, 1995	Kitt Peak	Spacewatch	·	1.2 km	MPC · JPL
249582	1995 SD_{88}	—	September 26, 1995	Kitt Peak	Spacewatch	·	3.5 km	MPC · JPL
249583	1995 TB_{12}	—	October 15, 1995	Kitt Peak	Spacewatch	·	2.3 km	MPC · JPL
249584	1995 UP_{10}	—	October 17, 1995	Kitt Peak	Spacewatch	·	1.7 km	MPC · JPL
249585	1995 UF_{15}	—	October 17, 1995	Kitt Peak	Spacewatch	·	1.5 km	MPC · JPL
249586	1995 WJ_{10}	—	November 16, 1995	Kitt Peak	Spacewatch	·	2.5 km	MPC · JPL
249587	1995 WA_{23}	—	November 18, 1995	Kitt Peak	Spacewatch	·	1.6 km	MPC · JPL
249588	1996 RP_{15}	—	September 13, 1996	Kitt Peak	Spacewatch	·	1.1 km	MPC · JPL
249589	1996 TM_{19}	—	October 4, 1996	Kitt Peak	Spacewatch	·	1.4 km	MPC · JPL
249590	1996 UG_{2}	—	October 17, 1996	Kitt Peak	Spacewatch	·	3.7 km	MPC · JPL
249591	1997 BO_{5}	—	January 31, 1997	Kitt Peak	Spacewatch	·	4.3 km	MPC · JPL
249592	1997 CL	—	February 1, 1997	Kitt Peak	Spacewatch	EOS	2.5 km	MPC · JPL
249593	1997 CL_{9}	—	February 1, 1997	Kitt Peak	Spacewatch	·	2.4 km	MPC · JPL
249594	1997 CK_{23}	—	February 4, 1997	Kitt Peak	Spacewatch	·	1.4 km	MPC · JPL
249595	1997 GH_{28}	—	April 13, 1997	Kitt Peak	Spacewatch	AMO +1km	1.0 km	MPC · JPL
249596	1997 RG_{5}	—	September 8, 1997	Caussols	ODAS	JUN	1.3 km	MPC · JPL
249597	1997 SW_{17}	—	September 30, 1997	Kitt Peak	Spacewatch	·	3.4 km	MPC · JPL
249598	1997 WB_{7}	—	November 24, 1997	Kitt Peak	Spacewatch	·	2.8 km	MPC · JPL
249599	1997 YN_{3}	—	December 21, 1997	Xinglong	SCAP	·	2.7 km	MPC · JPL
249600	1998 AP_{3}	—	January 2, 1998	Kitt Peak	Spacewatch	HOF	4.5 km	MPC · JPL

== 249601–249700 ==
back to top

Designation			Discovery			Properties		Ref
Permanent	Provisional	Named after	Date	Site	Discoverer(s)	Category	Diam.	Ref
249601	1998 RY_{69}	—	September 14, 1998	Socorro	LINEAR	·	1.2 km	MPC · JPL
249602	1998 SY_{44}	—	September 25, 1998	Kitt Peak	Spacewatch	THM	3.2 km	MPC · JPL
249603	1999 FO_{3}	—	March 19, 1999	Socorro	LINEAR	·	4.1 km	MPC · JPL
249604	1999 HM_{12}	—	April 17, 1999	Socorro	LINEAR	·	4.0 km	MPC · JPL
249605	1999 RS_{76}	—	September 7, 1999	Socorro	LINEAR	EMA	5.2 km	MPC · JPL
249606	1999 RV_{93}	—	September 7, 1999	Socorro	LINEAR	PHO	1.4 km	MPC · JPL
249607	1999 RB_{144}	—	September 9, 1999	Socorro	LINEAR	·	2.3 km	MPC · JPL
249608	1999 RZ_{152}	—	September 9, 1999	Socorro	LINEAR	·	3.9 km	MPC · JPL
249609	1999 RL_{161}	—	September 9, 1999	Socorro	LINEAR	·	1.6 km	MPC · JPL
249610	1999 RJ_{176}	—	September 9, 1999	Socorro	LINEAR	·	1.5 km	MPC · JPL
249611	1999 RX_{185}	—	September 9, 1999	Socorro	LINEAR	MAS	910 m	MPC · JPL
249612	1999 RD_{207}	—	September 8, 1999	Socorro	LINEAR	·	3.1 km	MPC · JPL
249613	1999 RH_{207}	—	September 8, 1999	Socorro	LINEAR	·	3.0 km	MPC · JPL
249614	1999 TT_{4}	—	October 4, 1999	Socorro	LINEAR	T_{j} (2.97)	4.7 km	MPC · JPL
249615	1999 TB_{5}	—	October 2, 1999	Catalina	CSS	AMO	550 m	MPC · JPL
249616	1999 TS_{13}	—	October 11, 1999	Črni Vrh	Mikuž, H.	·	2.1 km	MPC · JPL
249617	1999 TP_{21}	—	October 2, 1999	Kitt Peak	Spacewatch	·	6.9 km	MPC · JPL
249618	1999 TA_{30}	—	October 4, 1999	Socorro	LINEAR	EOS	3.4 km	MPC · JPL
249619	1999 TY_{34}	—	October 3, 1999	Socorro	LINEAR	·	4.0 km	MPC · JPL
249620	1999 TU_{35}	—	October 5, 1999	Socorro	LINEAR	T_{j} (2.98)	6.1 km	MPC · JPL
249621	1999 TO_{37}	—	October 1, 1999	Catalina	CSS	·	1.4 km	MPC · JPL
249622	1999 TL_{42}	—	October 3, 1999	Kitt Peak	Spacewatch	·	1.2 km	MPC · JPL
249623	1999 TP_{46}	—	October 4, 1999	Kitt Peak	Spacewatch	·	3.9 km	MPC · JPL
249624	1999 TF_{47}	—	October 4, 1999	Kitt Peak	Spacewatch	·	2.9 km	MPC · JPL
249625	1999 TY_{47}	—	October 4, 1999	Kitt Peak	Spacewatch	·	1.8 km	MPC · JPL
249626	1999 TZ_{49}	—	October 4, 1999	Kitt Peak	Spacewatch	·	1.4 km	MPC · JPL
249627	1999 TC_{60}	—	October 7, 1999	Kitt Peak	Spacewatch	·	3.5 km	MPC · JPL
249628	1999 TQ_{62}	—	October 7, 1999	Kitt Peak	Spacewatch	·	2.8 km	MPC · JPL
249629	1999 TO_{69}	—	October 9, 1999	Kitt Peak	Spacewatch	·	3.9 km	MPC · JPL
249630	1999 TT_{71}	—	October 9, 1999	Kitt Peak	Spacewatch	·	3.5 km	MPC · JPL
249631	1999 TH_{107}	—	October 4, 1999	Socorro	LINEAR	V	1.2 km	MPC · JPL
249632	1999 TT_{109}	—	October 4, 1999	Socorro	LINEAR	·	7.6 km	MPC · JPL
249633	1999 TT_{115}	—	October 4, 1999	Socorro	LINEAR	·	3.8 km	MPC · JPL
249634	1999 TP_{116}	—	October 4, 1999	Socorro	LINEAR	·	2.6 km	MPC · JPL
249635	1999 TQ_{120}	—	October 4, 1999	Socorro	LINEAR	·	1.6 km	MPC · JPL
249636	1999 TT_{137}	—	October 6, 1999	Socorro	LINEAR	·	4.3 km	MPC · JPL
249637	1999 TY_{137}	—	October 6, 1999	Socorro	LINEAR	·	5.4 km	MPC · JPL
249638	1999 TP_{146}	—	October 7, 1999	Socorro	LINEAR	·	2.9 km	MPC · JPL
249639	1999 TU_{162}	—	October 9, 1999	Socorro	LINEAR	(1298)	5.0 km	MPC · JPL
249640	1999 TW_{168}	—	October 10, 1999	Socorro	LINEAR	HYG	4.1 km	MPC · JPL
249641	1999 TO_{182}	—	October 11, 1999	Socorro	LINEAR	·	4.0 km	MPC · JPL
249642	1999 TU_{188}	—	October 12, 1999	Socorro	LINEAR	LIX · fast	5.3 km	MPC · JPL
249643	1999 TM_{190}	—	October 12, 1999	Socorro	LINEAR	PHO	1.5 km	MPC · JPL
249644	1999 TB_{204}	—	October 13, 1999	Socorro	LINEAR	·	3.4 km	MPC · JPL
249645	1999 TV_{212}	—	October 15, 1999	Socorro	LINEAR	·	1.8 km	MPC · JPL
249646	1999 TN_{237}	—	October 4, 1999	Kitt Peak	Spacewatch	·	3.9 km	MPC · JPL
249647	1999 TE_{238}	—	October 4, 1999	Catalina	CSS	·	2.3 km	MPC · JPL
249648	1999 TU_{252}	—	October 9, 1999	Socorro	LINEAR	MAS	960 m	MPC · JPL
249649	1999 TC_{256}	—	October 9, 1999	Socorro	LINEAR	ERI	3.0 km	MPC · JPL
249650	1999 TB_{259}	—	October 9, 1999	Socorro	LINEAR	THM	3.2 km	MPC · JPL
249651	1999 TH_{266}	—	October 3, 1999	Socorro	LINEAR	·	5.5 km	MPC · JPL
249652	1999 TY_{268}	—	October 3, 1999	Socorro	LINEAR	·	4.6 km	MPC · JPL
249653	1999 TV_{314}	—	October 8, 1999	Catalina	CSS	·	1.7 km	MPC · JPL
249654	1999 TR_{317}	—	October 12, 1999	Kitt Peak	Spacewatch	·	3.1 km	MPC · JPL
249655	1999 TW_{317}	—	October 12, 1999	Kitt Peak	Spacewatch	EOS	3.3 km	MPC · JPL
249656	1999 UU_{11}	—	October 29, 1999	Kitt Peak	Spacewatch	HYG	3.8 km	MPC · JPL
249657	1999 UF_{45}	—	October 31, 1999	Catalina	CSS	·	2.2 km	MPC · JPL
249658	1999 VL_{13}	—	November 2, 1999	Socorro	LINEAR	H	1.2 km	MPC · JPL
249659	1999 VD_{14}	—	November 2, 1999	Socorro	LINEAR	·	2.6 km	MPC · JPL
249660	1999 VK_{16}	—	November 2, 1999	Kitt Peak	Spacewatch	VER	3.5 km	MPC · JPL
249661	1999 VJ_{18}	—	November 2, 1999	Kitt Peak	Spacewatch	NYS ·	2.0 km	MPC · JPL
249662	1999 VP_{27}	—	November 3, 1999	Catalina	CSS	·	1.5 km	MPC · JPL
249663	1999 VO_{41}	—	November 4, 1999	Kitt Peak	Spacewatch	MAS	910 m	MPC · JPL
249664	1999 VG_{42}	—	November 4, 1999	Kitt Peak	Spacewatch	·	3.8 km	MPC · JPL
249665	1999 VJ_{53}	—	November 3, 1999	Socorro	LINEAR	·	2.3 km	MPC · JPL
249666	1999 VM_{75}	—	November 5, 1999	Kitt Peak	Spacewatch	ELF	4.6 km	MPC · JPL
249667	1999 VL_{102}	—	November 9, 1999	Socorro	LINEAR	·	1.5 km	MPC · JPL
249668	1999 VX_{107}	—	November 9, 1999	Socorro	LINEAR	THM	3.7 km	MPC · JPL
249669	1999 VC_{110}	—	November 9, 1999	Socorro	LINEAR	·	1.4 km	MPC · JPL
249670	1999 VE_{129}	—	November 11, 1999	Kitt Peak	Spacewatch	ERI	2.2 km	MPC · JPL
249671	1999 VT_{132}	—	November 10, 1999	Kitt Peak	Spacewatch	·	1.4 km	MPC · JPL
249672	1999 VE_{155}	—	November 13, 1999	Kitt Peak	Spacewatch	·	2.9 km	MPC · JPL
249673	1999 VY_{157}	—	November 14, 1999	Socorro	LINEAR	NYS	1.7 km	MPC · JPL
249674	1999 VM_{163}	—	November 14, 1999	Socorro	LINEAR	NYS	1.6 km	MPC · JPL
249675	1999 VZ_{178}	—	November 6, 1999	Socorro	LINEAR	·	3.9 km	MPC · JPL
249676	1999 VK_{185}	—	November 15, 1999	Socorro	LINEAR	TIR	2.8 km	MPC · JPL
249677	1999 VU_{186}	—	November 15, 1999	Socorro	LINEAR	·	1.9 km	MPC · JPL
249678	1999 VC_{211}	—	November 14, 1999	Socorro	LINEAR	THM	3.6 km	MPC · JPL
249679	1999 VB_{219}	—	November 3, 1999	Socorro	LINEAR	·	3.5 km	MPC · JPL
249680	1999 VH_{227}	—	November 3, 1999	Socorro	LINEAR	·	9.4 km	MPC · JPL
249681	1999 XH_{117}	—	December 5, 1999	Catalina	CSS	·	5.0 km	MPC · JPL
249682	1999 XW_{135}	—	December 12, 1999	Socorro	LINEAR	H	850 m	MPC · JPL
249683	1999 XD_{155}	—	December 8, 1999	Socorro	LINEAR	LIX	9.7 km	MPC · JPL
249684	1999 XN_{256}	—	December 7, 1999	Catalina	CSS	·	2.1 km	MPC · JPL
249685	1999 YD_{4}	—	December 19, 1999	Socorro	LINEAR	·	3.1 km	MPC · JPL
249686	2000 AV	—	January 2, 2000	Kitt Peak	Spacewatch	(5)	1.9 km	MPC · JPL
249687	2000 AY_{42}	—	January 5, 2000	Socorro	LINEAR	·	2.2 km	MPC · JPL
249688	2000 CL	—	February 2, 2000	Prescott	P. G. Comba	·	1.5 km	MPC · JPL
249689	2000 CE_{132}	—	February 3, 2000	Kitt Peak	Spacewatch	·	1.5 km	MPC · JPL
249690	2000 DP_{13}	—	February 28, 2000	Kitt Peak	Spacewatch	·	1.6 km	MPC · JPL
249691	2000 DY_{21}	—	February 29, 2000	Socorro	LINEAR	·	1.9 km	MPC · JPL
249692	2000 DE_{22}	—	February 29, 2000	Socorro	LINEAR	·	6.2 km	MPC · JPL
249693	2000 DE_{30}	—	February 29, 2000	Socorro	LINEAR	·	2.8 km	MPC · JPL
249694	2000 DW_{48}	—	February 29, 2000	Socorro	LINEAR	MAR	1.3 km	MPC · JPL
249695	2000 DR_{57}	—	February 29, 2000	Socorro	LINEAR	·	1.5 km	MPC · JPL
249696	2000 DO_{76}	—	February 29, 2000	Socorro	LINEAR	·	2.3 km	MPC · JPL
249697	2000 EF_{16}	—	March 4, 2000	Kitt Peak	Spacewatch	·	1.0 km	MPC · JPL
249698	2000 ER_{84}	—	March 8, 2000	Socorro	LINEAR	·	2.2 km	MPC · JPL
249699	2000 EM_{143}	—	March 3, 2000	Socorro	LINEAR	·	1.5 km	MPC · JPL
249700	2000 FB_{28}	—	March 27, 2000	Anderson Mesa	LONEOS	·	2.0 km	MPC · JPL

== 249701–249800 ==
back to top

Designation			Discovery			Properties		Ref
Permanent	Provisional	Named after	Date	Site	Discoverer(s)	Category	Diam.	Ref
249701	2000 GT_{8}	—	April 5, 2000	Socorro	LINEAR	·	1.8 km	MPC · JPL
249702	2000 GC_{129}	—	April 5, 2000	Kitt Peak	Spacewatch	·	2.1 km	MPC · JPL
249703	2000 GA_{166}	—	April 5, 2000	Socorro	LINEAR	·	2.0 km	MPC · JPL
249704	2000 HO_{1}	—	April 25, 2000	Kitt Peak	Spacewatch	·	2.7 km	MPC · JPL
249705	2000 HF_{72}	—	April 25, 2000	Anderson Mesa	LONEOS	·	2.4 km	MPC · JPL
249706	2000 JJ_{8}	—	May 5, 2000	Kitt Peak	Spacewatch	·	2.2 km	MPC · JPL
249707	2000 KA_{63}	—	May 26, 2000	Anderson Mesa	LONEOS	·	2.2 km	MPC · JPL
249708	2000 OC_{47}	—	July 31, 2000	Socorro	LINEAR	·	1.2 km	MPC · JPL
249709	2000 OL_{68}	—	July 29, 2000	Anderson Mesa	LONEOS	·	1.2 km	MPC · JPL
249710	2000 QO_{13}	—	August 24, 2000	Socorro	LINEAR	·	1.2 km	MPC · JPL
249711	2000 QM_{37}	—	August 24, 2000	Socorro	LINEAR	·	1.2 km	MPC · JPL
249712	2000 QU_{68}	—	August 24, 2000	Wise	Wise	·	1.0 km	MPC · JPL
249713	2000 QX_{74}	—	August 24, 2000	Socorro	LINEAR	·	3.2 km	MPC · JPL
249714	2000 QQ_{143}	—	August 31, 2000	Socorro	LINEAR	·	1.2 km	MPC · JPL
249715	2000 QE_{179}	—	August 31, 2000	Socorro	LINEAR	·	920 m	MPC · JPL
249716	2000 QF_{216}	—	August 31, 2000	Socorro	LINEAR	·	1.1 km	MPC · JPL
249717	2000 QV_{228}	—	August 31, 2000	Socorro	LINEAR	·	3.1 km	MPC · JPL
249718	2000 QS_{254}	—	August 28, 2000	Socorro	LINEAR	·	1.4 km	MPC · JPL
249719	2000 RF_{25}	—	September 1, 2000	Socorro	LINEAR	·	1.1 km	MPC · JPL
249720	2000 RV_{83}	—	September 1, 2000	Socorro	LINEAR	·	1.2 km	MPC · JPL
249721	2000 RM_{86}	—	September 2, 2000	Anderson Mesa	LONEOS	·	3.5 km	MPC · JPL
249722	2000 RU_{93}	—	September 4, 2000	Anderson Mesa	LONEOS	·	3.8 km	MPC · JPL
249723	2000 SK_{10}	—	September 22, 2000	Haleakala	NEAT	·	4.1 km	MPC · JPL
249724	2000 SR_{17}	—	September 23, 2000	Socorro	LINEAR	·	1.1 km	MPC · JPL
249725	2000 SY_{25}	—	September 23, 2000	Socorro	LINEAR	·	1.2 km	MPC · JPL
249726	2000 SS_{26}	—	September 23, 2000	Socorro	LINEAR	·	1.0 km	MPC · JPL
249727	2000 SZ_{34}	—	September 24, 2000	Socorro	LINEAR	·	1.2 km	MPC · JPL
249728	2000 SO_{35}	—	September 24, 2000	Socorro	LINEAR	·	790 m	MPC · JPL
249729	2000 SH_{40}	—	September 24, 2000	Socorro	LINEAR	·	920 m	MPC · JPL
249730	2000 SC_{45}	—	September 28, 2000	Socorro	LINEAR	H	680 m	MPC · JPL
249731	2000 SS_{54}	—	September 24, 2000	Socorro	LINEAR	·	1.0 km	MPC · JPL
249732	2000 SC_{82}	—	September 24, 2000	Socorro	LINEAR	·	1.3 km	MPC · JPL
249733	2000 SL_{82}	—	September 24, 2000	Socorro	LINEAR	·	1.2 km	MPC · JPL
249734	2000 SP_{88}	—	September 24, 2000	Socorro	LINEAR	·	880 m	MPC · JPL
249735	2000 SA_{94}	—	September 23, 2000	Socorro	LINEAR	·	4.0 km	MPC · JPL
249736	2000 SD_{104}	—	September 24, 2000	Socorro	LINEAR	·	940 m	MPC · JPL
249737	2000 SE_{138}	—	September 23, 2000	Socorro	LINEAR	·	1.2 km	MPC · JPL
249738	2000 SB_{159}	—	September 27, 2000	Kitt Peak	Spacewatch	·	2.7 km	MPC · JPL
249739	2000 SN_{180}	—	September 28, 2000	Socorro	LINEAR	·	4.1 km	MPC · JPL
249740	2000 SF_{192}	—	September 24, 2000	Socorro	LINEAR	·	1.0 km	MPC · JPL
249741	2000 SE_{202}	—	September 24, 2000	Socorro	LINEAR	·	860 m	MPC · JPL
249742	2000 SM_{207}	—	September 24, 2000	Socorro	LINEAR	·	1.2 km	MPC · JPL
249743	2000 SR_{214}	—	September 26, 2000	Socorro	LINEAR	·	930 m	MPC · JPL
249744	2000 SR_{233}	—	September 21, 2000	Socorro	LINEAR	·	1.2 km	MPC · JPL
249745	2000 SU_{233}	—	September 21, 2000	Socorro	LINEAR	·	1.1 km	MPC · JPL
249746	2000 SN_{236}	—	September 24, 2000	Socorro	LINEAR	·	1.1 km	MPC · JPL
249747	2000 SE_{238}	—	September 25, 2000	Socorro	LINEAR	·	1.3 km	MPC · JPL
249748	2000 SK_{239}	—	September 27, 2000	Socorro	LINEAR	·	2.0 km	MPC · JPL
249749	2000 SV_{250}	—	September 24, 2000	Socorro	LINEAR	·	890 m	MPC · JPL
249750	2000 SK_{282}	—	September 23, 2000	Socorro	LINEAR	·	1.1 km	MPC · JPL
249751	2000 SM_{306}	—	September 30, 2000	Socorro	LINEAR	EOS	3.6 km	MPC · JPL
249752	2000 SR_{306}	—	September 30, 2000	Socorro	LINEAR	·	1.1 km	MPC · JPL
249753	2000 SO_{307}	—	September 30, 2000	Socorro	LINEAR	·	1.3 km	MPC · JPL
249754	2000 SB_{326}	—	September 29, 2000	Kitt Peak	Spacewatch	·	990 m	MPC · JPL
249755	2000 SJ_{350}	—	September 29, 2000	Anderson Mesa	LONEOS	L5	10 km	MPC · JPL
249756	2000 SD_{362}	—	September 23, 2000	Anderson Mesa	LONEOS	·	1.1 km	MPC · JPL
249757	2000 TG_{7}	—	October 1, 2000	Socorro	LINEAR	TEL	1.8 km	MPC · JPL
249758	2000 TG_{13}	—	October 1, 2000	Socorro	LINEAR	·	810 m	MPC · JPL
249759	2000 TM_{27}	—	October 3, 2000	Socorro	LINEAR	KOR	2.1 km	MPC · JPL
249760	2000 TD_{49}	—	October 1, 2000	Socorro	LINEAR	·	2.6 km	MPC · JPL
249761	2000 UG_{35}	—	October 24, 2000	Socorro	LINEAR	EOS	3.2 km	MPC · JPL
249762	2000 UM_{37}	—	October 24, 2000	Socorro	LINEAR	·	3.6 km	MPC · JPL
249763	2000 UW_{61}	—	October 25, 2000	Socorro	LINEAR	·	2.9 km	MPC · JPL
249764	2000 UN_{62}	—	October 25, 2000	Socorro	LINEAR	·	1.2 km	MPC · JPL
249765	2000 UU_{68}	—	October 25, 2000	Socorro	LINEAR	·	3.5 km	MPC · JPL
249766	2000 UF_{97}	—	October 25, 2000	Socorro	LINEAR	EOS	2.9 km	MPC · JPL
249767	2000 VK_{9}	—	November 1, 2000	Socorro	LINEAR	TIR	4.0 km	MPC · JPL
249768	2000 VO_{29}	—	November 1, 2000	Socorro	LINEAR	·	1.5 km	MPC · JPL
249769	2000 VT_{51}	—	November 3, 2000	Socorro	LINEAR	V	950 m	MPC · JPL
249770	2000 VL_{53}	—	November 3, 2000	Socorro	LINEAR	·	3.5 km	MPC · JPL
249771	2000 VS_{53}	—	November 3, 2000	Socorro	LINEAR	·	930 m	MPC · JPL
249772	2000 VF_{62}	—	November 15, 2000	Socorro	LINEAR	·	1.6 km	MPC · JPL
249773	2000 WV_{8}	—	November 20, 2000	Socorro	LINEAR	·	4.1 km	MPC · JPL
249774	2000 WD_{18}	—	November 21, 2000	Socorro	LINEAR	·	4.1 km	MPC · JPL
249775	2000 WO_{40}	—	November 20, 2000	Socorro	LINEAR	·	3.0 km	MPC · JPL
249776	2000 WD_{44}	—	November 21, 2000	Socorro	LINEAR	·	3.6 km	MPC · JPL
249777	2000 WE_{50}	—	November 26, 2000	Socorro	LINEAR	·	1.0 km	MPC · JPL
249778	2000 WS_{64}	—	November 27, 2000	Kitt Peak	Spacewatch	·	3.1 km	MPC · JPL
249779	2000 WG_{67}	—	November 26, 2000	Socorro	LINEAR	·	6.0 km	MPC · JPL
249780	2000 WD_{86}	—	November 20, 2000	Socorro	LINEAR	·	4.2 km	MPC · JPL
249781	2000 WV_{121}	—	November 29, 2000	Socorro	LINEAR	·	1.3 km	MPC · JPL
249782	2000 WU_{126}	—	November 16, 2000	Kitt Peak	Spacewatch	·	1.2 km	MPC · JPL
249783	2000 WH_{137}	—	November 20, 2000	Socorro	LINEAR	·	1.2 km	MPC · JPL
249784	2000 WD_{146}	—	November 23, 2000	Haleakala	NEAT	·	4.4 km	MPC · JPL
249785	2000 WU_{150}	—	November 19, 2000	Socorro	LINEAR	H	830 m	MPC · JPL
249786	2000 WD_{169}	—	November 25, 2000	Anderson Mesa	LONEOS	·	4.8 km	MPC · JPL
249787	2000 XE_{34}	—	December 4, 2000	Socorro	LINEAR	PHO	1.7 km	MPC · JPL
249788	2000 XA_{53}	—	December 6, 2000	Socorro	LINEAR	EUP	5.7 km	MPC · JPL
249789	2000 XC_{53}	—	December 6, 2000	Socorro	LINEAR	·	6.0 km	MPC · JPL
249790	2000 YN_{1}	—	December 17, 2000	Socorro	LINEAR	·	5.4 km	MPC · JPL
249791	2000 YK_{2}	—	December 19, 2000	Kitt Peak	Spacewatch	·	1.2 km	MPC · JPL
249792	2000 YN_{10}	—	December 22, 2000	Socorro	LINEAR	·	950 m	MPC · JPL
249793	2000 YB_{14}	—	December 23, 2000	Kitt Peak	Spacewatch	(2076)	1.2 km	MPC · JPL
249794	2000 YO_{21}	—	December 28, 2000	Haleakala	NEAT	·	5.7 km	MPC · JPL
249795	2000 YS_{44}	—	December 30, 2000	Socorro	LINEAR	·	1.3 km	MPC · JPL
249796	2000 YE_{56}	—	December 30, 2000	Socorro	LINEAR	·	4.6 km	MPC · JPL
249797	2000 YX_{59}	—	December 30, 2000	Socorro	LINEAR	·	1.1 km	MPC · JPL
249798	2000 YZ_{63}	—	December 30, 2000	Socorro	LINEAR	·	1.3 km	MPC · JPL
249799	2000 YX_{81}	—	December 30, 2000	Socorro	LINEAR	·	1.4 km	MPC · JPL
249800	2000 YA_{91}	—	December 30, 2000	Socorro	LINEAR	·	1.3 km	MPC · JPL

== 249801–249900 ==
back to top

Designation			Discovery			Properties		Ref
Permanent	Provisional	Named after	Date	Site	Discoverer(s)	Category	Diam.	Ref
249801	2000 YS_{93}	—	December 30, 2000	Socorro	LINEAR	·	3.2 km	MPC · JPL
249802	2000 YZ_{138}	—	December 27, 2000	Anderson Mesa	LONEOS	·	3.7 km	MPC · JPL
249803	2001 AV_{7}	—	January 2, 2001	Socorro	LINEAR	·	3.7 km	MPC · JPL
249804	2001 AG_{30}	—	January 4, 2001	Socorro	LINEAR	·	5.8 km	MPC · JPL
249805	2001 AW_{45}	—	January 6, 2001	Socorro	LINEAR	H	660 m	MPC · JPL
249806	2001 BB_{24}	—	January 20, 2001	Socorro	LINEAR	·	2.2 km	MPC · JPL
249807	2001 BP_{58}	—	January 21, 2001	Socorro	LINEAR	·	6.3 km	MPC · JPL
249808	2001 BL_{79}	—	January 21, 2001	Socorro	LINEAR	·	1.6 km	MPC · JPL
249809	2001 CL_{31}	—	February 12, 2001	Prescott	P. G. Comba	·	5.3 km	MPC · JPL
249810	2001 DR_{34}	—	February 19, 2001	Socorro	LINEAR	·	4.9 km	MPC · JPL
249811	2001 DX_{38}	—	February 19, 2001	Socorro	LINEAR	·	4.4 km	MPC · JPL
249812	2001 DW_{75}	—	February 20, 2001	Socorro	LINEAR	·	2.2 km	MPC · JPL
249813	2001 DB_{100}	—	February 17, 2001	Haleakala	NEAT	·	2.9 km	MPC · JPL
249814	2001 DG_{103}	—	February 16, 2001	Socorro	LINEAR	·	4.1 km	MPC · JPL
249815	2001 FW_{4}	—	March 18, 2001	Socorro	LINEAR	H	810 m	MPC · JPL
249816	2001 FD_{90}	—	March 26, 2001	Socorro	LINEAR	AMO	490 m	MPC · JPL
249817	2001 FL_{105}	—	March 18, 2001	Socorro	LINEAR	MAS	970 m	MPC · JPL
249818	2001 FT_{114}	—	March 19, 2001	Socorro	LINEAR	NYS	1.6 km	MPC · JPL
249819	2001 FA_{117}	—	March 19, 2001	Haleakala	NEAT	PHO	1.3 km	MPC · JPL
249820	2001 FO_{148}	—	March 24, 2001	Anderson Mesa	LONEOS	H	790 m	MPC · JPL
249821	2001 FS_{150}	—	March 24, 2001	Anderson Mesa	LONEOS	·	3.1 km	MPC · JPL
249822	2001 FY_{177}	—	March 19, 2001	Socorro	LINEAR	NYS	1.8 km	MPC · JPL
249823 Delmarbarker	2001 FK_{219}	Delmarbarker	March 21, 2001	Kitt Peak	SKADS	·	1.8 km	MPC · JPL
249824	2001 GU_{6}	—	April 15, 2001	Socorro	LINEAR	PHO	2.2 km	MPC · JPL
249825	2001 HT_{43}	—	April 16, 2001	Anderson Mesa	LONEOS	·	2.3 km	MPC · JPL
249826	2001 HB_{51}	—	April 23, 2001	Socorro	LINEAR	·	2.2 km	MPC · JPL
249827	2001 KR_{54}	—	May 18, 2001	Socorro	LINEAR	·	1.9 km	MPC · JPL
249828	2001 KX_{61}	—	May 18, 2001	Socorro	LINEAR	·	2.1 km	MPC · JPL
249829	2001 LH_{18}	—	June 13, 2001	Anderson Mesa	LONEOS	(194)	3.0 km	MPC · JPL
249830	2001 OD_{12}	—	July 20, 2001	Palomar	NEAT	·	2.5 km	MPC · JPL
249831	2001 OW_{24}	—	July 16, 2001	Anderson Mesa	LONEOS	·	1.7 km	MPC · JPL
249832	2001 OU_{37}	—	July 20, 2001	Palomar	NEAT	·	3.3 km	MPC · JPL
249833	2001 OP_{41}	—	July 21, 2001	Palomar	NEAT	·	3.0 km	MPC · JPL
249834	2001 ON_{57}	—	July 16, 2001	Haleakala	NEAT	·	2.5 km	MPC · JPL
249835	2001 OD_{66}	—	July 22, 2001	Anderson Mesa	LONEOS	·	3.6 km	MPC · JPL
249836	2001 OJ_{88}	—	July 21, 2001	Haleakala	NEAT	·	2.6 km	MPC · JPL
249837	2001 OE_{97}	—	July 25, 2001	Haleakala	NEAT	·	3.2 km	MPC · JPL
249838	2001 OR_{104}	—	July 28, 2001	Anderson Mesa	LONEOS	slow	2.3 km	MPC · JPL
249839	2001 PB_{10}	—	August 8, 2001	Haleakala	NEAT	·	2.6 km	MPC · JPL
249840	2001 PT_{16}	—	August 9, 2001	Palomar	NEAT	·	3.2 km	MPC · JPL
249841	2001 PA_{33}	—	August 10, 2001	Palomar	NEAT	·	3.8 km	MPC · JPL
249842	2001 PF_{33}	—	August 10, 2001	Palomar	NEAT	·	2.1 km	MPC · JPL
249843	2001 PD_{34}	—	August 10, 2001	Palomar	NEAT	·	1.8 km	MPC · JPL
249844	2001 PA_{35}	—	August 10, 2001	Palomar	NEAT	·	2.6 km	MPC · JPL
249845	2001 PT_{43}	—	August 14, 2001	Haleakala	NEAT	·	2.4 km	MPC · JPL
249846	2001 PU_{46}	—	August 13, 2001	Haleakala	NEAT	·	3.8 km	MPC · JPL
249847	2001 PE_{59}	—	August 14, 2001	Haleakala	NEAT	·	3.0 km	MPC · JPL
249848	2001 PJ_{67}	—	August 1, 2001	Palomar	NEAT	·	2.4 km	MPC · JPL
249849	2001 QA_{11}	—	August 16, 2001	Socorro	LINEAR	·	1.6 km	MPC · JPL
249850	2001 QC_{17}	—	August 16, 2001	Socorro	LINEAR	·	2.4 km	MPC · JPL
249851	2001 QY_{41}	—	August 16, 2001	Socorro	LINEAR	·	2.5 km	MPC · JPL
249852	2001 QV_{46}	—	August 16, 2001	Socorro	LINEAR	·	2.6 km	MPC · JPL
249853	2001 QC_{49}	—	August 16, 2001	Socorro	LINEAR	·	2.2 km	MPC · JPL
249854	2001 QG_{53}	—	August 16, 2001	Socorro	LINEAR	EUN	3.2 km	MPC · JPL
249855	2001 QV_{55}	—	August 16, 2001	Socorro	LINEAR	·	2.2 km	MPC · JPL
249856	2001 QV_{56}	—	August 16, 2001	Socorro	LINEAR	·	2.7 km	MPC · JPL
249857	2001 QL_{104}	—	August 20, 2001	Socorro	LINEAR	·	2.8 km	MPC · JPL
249858	2001 QZ_{118}	—	August 17, 2001	Socorro	LINEAR	·	4.1 km	MPC · JPL
249859	2001 QK_{119}	—	August 17, 2001	Socorro	LINEAR	·	3.3 km	MPC · JPL
249860	2001 QL_{124}	—	August 19, 2001	Socorro	LINEAR	·	2.9 km	MPC · JPL
249861	2001 QC_{131}	—	August 20, 2001	Socorro	LINEAR	·	3.0 km	MPC · JPL
249862	2001 QB_{133}	—	August 21, 2001	Socorro	LINEAR	·	1.5 km	MPC · JPL
249863	2001 QP_{133}	—	August 21, 2001	Socorro	LINEAR	JUN	1.7 km	MPC · JPL
249864	2001 QC_{160}	—	August 23, 2001	Anderson Mesa	LONEOS	·	2.7 km	MPC · JPL
249865	2001 QN_{162}	—	August 23, 2001	Anderson Mesa	LONEOS	·	2.2 km	MPC · JPL
249866	2001 QM_{165}	—	August 24, 2001	Haleakala	NEAT	·	2.2 km	MPC · JPL
249867	2001 QP_{170}	—	August 24, 2001	Socorro	LINEAR	·	2.8 km	MPC · JPL
249868	2001 QO_{171}	—	August 25, 2001	Socorro	LINEAR	·	1.7 km	MPC · JPL
249869	2001 QF_{172}	—	August 25, 2001	Socorro	LINEAR	·	2.9 km	MPC · JPL
249870	2001 QV_{182}	—	August 17, 2001	Palomar	NEAT	·	4.1 km	MPC · JPL
249871	2001 QZ_{190}	—	August 22, 2001	Goodricke-Pigott	R. A. Tucker	·	1.7 km	MPC · JPL
249872	2001 QF_{201}	—	August 22, 2001	Kitt Peak	Spacewatch	·	2.9 km	MPC · JPL
249873	2001 QJ_{202}	—	August 23, 2001	Anderson Mesa	LONEOS	JUN	1.6 km	MPC · JPL
249874	2001 QH_{207}	—	August 23, 2001	Socorro	LINEAR	·	3.9 km	MPC · JPL
249875	2001 QH_{210}	—	August 23, 2001	Kitt Peak	Spacewatch	·	2.5 km	MPC · JPL
249876	2001 QS_{213}	—	August 23, 2001	Anderson Mesa	LONEOS	ADE	4.3 km	MPC · JPL
249877	2001 QG_{227}	—	August 24, 2001	Anderson Mesa	LONEOS	·	2.9 km	MPC · JPL
249878	2001 QY_{246}	—	August 24, 2001	Socorro	LINEAR	·	2.0 km	MPC · JPL
249879	2001 QK_{253}	—	August 25, 2001	Socorro	LINEAR	·	2.4 km	MPC · JPL
249880	2001 QT_{266}	—	August 20, 2001	Socorro	LINEAR	·	1.6 km	MPC · JPL
249881	2001 QF_{271}	—	August 19, 2001	Socorro	LINEAR	·	2.6 km	MPC · JPL
249882	2001 QP_{271}	—	August 19, 2001	Socorro	LINEAR	·	3.8 km	MPC · JPL
249883	2001 QB_{279}	—	August 19, 2001	Socorro	LINEAR	·	3.0 km	MPC · JPL
249884	2001 QV_{286}	—	August 17, 2001	Palomar	NEAT	EUN	1.9 km	MPC · JPL
249885	2001 RW_{9}	—	September 10, 2001	Socorro	LINEAR	GAL	1.7 km	MPC · JPL
249886	2001 RY_{11}	—	September 9, 2001	Socorro	LINEAR	AMO +1km	1.2 km	MPC · JPL
249887	2001 RR_{29}	—	September 7, 2001	Socorro	LINEAR	·	2.1 km	MPC · JPL
249888	2001 RD_{34}	—	September 8, 2001	Socorro	LINEAR	·	2.8 km	MPC · JPL
249889	2001 RS_{43}	—	September 10, 2001	Desert Eagle	W. K. Y. Yeung	·	2.0 km	MPC · JPL
249890	2001 RN_{51}	—	September 12, 2001	Socorro	LINEAR	·	3.7 km	MPC · JPL
249891	2001 RS_{61}	—	September 12, 2001	Socorro	LINEAR	AEO	1.9 km	MPC · JPL
249892	2001 RU_{66}	—	September 10, 2001	Socorro	LINEAR	·	2.5 km	MPC · JPL
249893	2001 RS_{72}	—	September 10, 2001	Socorro	LINEAR	·	2.1 km	MPC · JPL
249894	2001 RF_{95}	—	September 11, 2001	Anderson Mesa	LONEOS	·	2.3 km	MPC · JPL
249895	2001 RU_{102}	—	September 12, 2001	Socorro	LINEAR	·	2.6 km	MPC · JPL
249896	2001 SK_{4}	—	September 17, 2001	Goodricke-Pigott	R. A. Tucker	·	2.5 km	MPC · JPL
249897	2001 SD_{11}	—	September 16, 2001	Socorro	LINEAR	EUN	2.2 km	MPC · JPL
249898	2001 SG_{11}	—	September 16, 2001	Socorro	LINEAR	·	2.2 km	MPC · JPL
249899	2001 SL_{12}	—	September 16, 2001	Socorro	LINEAR	·	2.8 km	MPC · JPL
249900	2001 SZ_{60}	—	September 17, 2001	Socorro	LINEAR	·	2.8 km	MPC · JPL

== 249901–250000 ==
back to top

Designation			Discovery			Properties		Ref
Permanent	Provisional	Named after	Date	Site	Discoverer(s)	Category	Diam.	Ref
249901	2001 SZ_{82}	—	September 20, 2001	Socorro	LINEAR	·	2.5 km	MPC · JPL
249902	2001 SX_{86}	—	September 20, 2001	Socorro	LINEAR	·	2.1 km	MPC · JPL
249903	2001 SK_{89}	—	September 20, 2001	Socorro	LINEAR	PAD	2.0 km	MPC · JPL
249904	2001 SG_{90}	—	September 20, 2001	Socorro	LINEAR	·	2.7 km	MPC · JPL
249905	2001 SK_{91}	—	September 20, 2001	Socorro	LINEAR	HOF	2.9 km	MPC · JPL
249906	2001 SE_{94}	—	September 20, 2001	Socorro	LINEAR	·	2.0 km	MPC · JPL
249907	2001 SQ_{104}	—	September 20, 2001	Socorro	LINEAR	AGN	1.3 km	MPC · JPL
249908	2001 SR_{143}	—	September 16, 2001	Socorro	LINEAR	·	2.8 km	MPC · JPL
249909	2001 SC_{152}	—	September 17, 2001	Socorro	LINEAR	·	2.9 km	MPC · JPL
249910	2001 SO_{162}	—	September 17, 2001	Socorro	LINEAR	EUN	1.9 km	MPC · JPL
249911	2001 SN_{166}	—	September 19, 2001	Socorro	LINEAR	·	2.9 km	MPC · JPL
249912	2001 SW_{170}	—	September 16, 2001	Socorro	LINEAR	NEM	2.9 km	MPC · JPL
249913	2001 SS_{179}	—	September 19, 2001	Socorro	LINEAR	·	2.9 km	MPC · JPL
249914	2001 SX_{181}	—	September 19, 2001	Socorro	LINEAR	·	2.8 km	MPC · JPL
249915	2001 SQ_{192}	—	September 19, 2001	Socorro	LINEAR	AGN	1.7 km	MPC · JPL
249916	2001 SV_{204}	—	September 19, 2001	Socorro	LINEAR	·	2.9 km	MPC · JPL
249917	2001 SN_{234}	—	September 19, 2001	Socorro	LINEAR	·	2.7 km	MPC · JPL
249918	2001 SS_{259}	—	September 20, 2001	Socorro	LINEAR	·	2.8 km	MPC · JPL
249919	2001 SL_{261}	—	September 20, 2001	Socorro	LINEAR	·	2.8 km	MPC · JPL
249920	2001 SK_{288}	—	September 28, 2001	Palomar	NEAT	·	2.0 km	MPC · JPL
249921	2001 SV_{292}	—	September 16, 2001	Socorro	LINEAR	HOF	3.6 km	MPC · JPL
249922	2001 SG_{295}	—	September 20, 2001	Socorro	LINEAR	NEM	2.8 km	MPC · JPL
249923	2001 SZ_{319}	—	September 21, 2001	Socorro	LINEAR	·	2.8 km	MPC · JPL
249924	2001 SR_{322}	—	September 25, 2001	Socorro	LINEAR	·	3.0 km	MPC · JPL
249925	2001 SJ_{333}	—	September 19, 2001	Kitt Peak	Spacewatch	NEM	2.1 km	MPC · JPL
249926	2001 SQ_{346}	—	September 25, 2001	Palomar	NEAT	·	3.3 km	MPC · JPL
249927	2001 SS_{353}	—	September 25, 2001	Socorro	LINEAR	·	3.7 km	MPC · JPL
249928	2001 TV_{3}	—	October 7, 2001	Palomar	NEAT	·	2.0 km	MPC · JPL
249929	2001 TD_{14}	—	October 12, 2001	Ondřejov	P. Kušnirák, P. Pravec	HOF	2.7 km	MPC · JPL
249930	2001 TO_{15}	—	October 11, 2001	Socorro	LINEAR	·	1.9 km	MPC · JPL
249931	2001 TH_{44}	—	October 14, 2001	Socorro	LINEAR	·	2.7 km	MPC · JPL
249932	2001 TJ_{52}	—	October 13, 2001	Socorro	LINEAR	·	1.7 km	MPC · JPL
249933	2001 TB_{54}	—	October 13, 2001	Socorro	LINEAR	ADE	3.2 km	MPC · JPL
249934	2001 TA_{93}	—	October 14, 2001	Socorro	LINEAR	·	3.1 km	MPC · JPL
249935	2001 TE_{115}	—	October 14, 2001	Socorro	LINEAR	·	3.1 km	MPC · JPL
249936	2001 TR_{124}	—	October 12, 2001	Haleakala	NEAT	·	2.9 km	MPC · JPL
249937	2001 TP_{127}	—	October 12, 2001	Anderson Mesa	LONEOS	·	2.4 km	MPC · JPL
249938	2001 TN_{128}	—	October 13, 2001	Palomar	NEAT	·	3.1 km	MPC · JPL
249939	2001 TX_{141}	—	October 10, 2001	Palomar	NEAT	·	3.2 km	MPC · JPL
249940	2001 TL_{166}	—	October 15, 2001	Socorro	LINEAR	·	4.2 km	MPC · JPL
249941	2001 TZ_{167}	—	October 15, 2001	Socorro	LINEAR	·	2.4 km	MPC · JPL
249942	2001 TB_{168}	—	October 15, 2001	Socorro	LINEAR	·	3.0 km	MPC · JPL
249943	2001 TD_{177}	—	October 14, 2001	Socorro	LINEAR	·	2.7 km	MPC · JPL
249944	2001 TV_{178}	—	October 14, 2001	Socorro	LINEAR	·	2.5 km	MPC · JPL
249945	2001 TS_{179}	—	October 14, 2001	Socorro	LINEAR	·	2.4 km	MPC · JPL
249946	2001 TP_{187}	—	October 14, 2001	Socorro	LINEAR	·	2.4 km	MPC · JPL
249947	2001 TU_{196}	—	October 15, 2001	Palomar	NEAT	·	3.2 km	MPC · JPL
249948	2001 TT_{198}	—	October 11, 2001	Socorro	LINEAR	·	2.3 km	MPC · JPL
249949	2001 TZ_{199}	—	October 11, 2001	Socorro	LINEAR	·	3.2 km	MPC · JPL
249950	2001 TQ_{212}	—	October 13, 2001	Anderson Mesa	LONEOS	DOR	4.4 km	MPC · JPL
249951	2001 TT_{215}	—	October 13, 2001	Palomar	NEAT	·	2.9 km	MPC · JPL
249952	2001 TD_{222}	—	October 14, 2001	Socorro	LINEAR	·	3.2 km	MPC · JPL
249953	2001 TG_{228}	—	October 15, 2001	Kitt Peak	Spacewatch	AGN	1.4 km	MPC · JPL
249954	2001 TQ_{234}	—	October 15, 2001	Palomar	NEAT	·	3.0 km	MPC · JPL
249955	2001 TJ_{238}	—	October 15, 2001	Palomar	NEAT	GEF	3.5 km	MPC · JPL
249956	2001 UM_{8}	—	October 17, 2001	Socorro	LINEAR	AGN	1.6 km	MPC · JPL
249957	2001 UG_{11}	—	October 18, 2001	Palomar	NEAT	·	3.0 km	MPC · JPL
249958	2001 UE_{26}	—	October 18, 2001	Socorro	LINEAR	·	5.3 km	MPC · JPL
249959	2001 UA_{27}	—	October 16, 2001	Palomar	NEAT	·	2.5 km	MPC · JPL
249960	2001 UQ_{38}	—	October 17, 2001	Socorro	LINEAR	AST	2.8 km	MPC · JPL
249961	2001 UV_{49}	—	October 17, 2001	Socorro	LINEAR	·	3.7 km	MPC · JPL
249962	2001 UM_{54}	—	October 18, 2001	Socorro	LINEAR	·	3.0 km	MPC · JPL
249963	2001 UK_{71}	—	October 17, 2001	Kitt Peak	Spacewatch	·	2.8 km	MPC · JPL
249964	2001 UN_{71}	—	October 19, 2001	Kitt Peak	Spacewatch	HOF	2.6 km	MPC · JPL
249965	2001 UD_{77}	—	October 17, 2001	Socorro	LINEAR	·	2.5 km	MPC · JPL
249966	2001 UJ_{98}	—	October 17, 2001	Socorro	LINEAR	·	3.2 km	MPC · JPL
249967	2001 UO_{121}	—	October 22, 2001	Socorro	LINEAR	·	5.6 km	MPC · JPL
249968	2001 UV_{125}	—	October 23, 2001	Palomar	NEAT	·	2.8 km	MPC · JPL
249969	2001 UC_{170}	—	October 21, 2001	Socorro	LINEAR	PAD	3.2 km	MPC · JPL
249970	2001 UP_{183}	—	October 16, 2001	Palomar	NEAT	·	2.4 km	MPC · JPL
249971	2001 UM_{193}	—	October 18, 2001	Socorro	LINEAR	·	3.5 km	MPC · JPL
249972	2001 UV_{197}	—	October 19, 2001	Palomar	NEAT	·	2.7 km	MPC · JPL
249973	2001 UL_{218}	—	October 26, 2001	Kitt Peak	Spacewatch	BRA	2.2 km	MPC · JPL
249974	2001 UZ_{229}	—	October 17, 2001	Palomar	NEAT	·	2.7 km	MPC · JPL
249975	2001 VU_{4}	—	November 11, 2001	Socorro	LINEAR	(23255)	5.9 km	MPC · JPL
249976	2001 VK_{41}	—	November 9, 2001	Socorro	LINEAR	·	3.4 km	MPC · JPL
249977	2001 VE_{48}	—	November 9, 2001	Socorro	LINEAR	·	3.4 km	MPC · JPL
249978	2001 VB_{50}	—	November 10, 2001	Socorro	LINEAR	DOR	4.0 km	MPC · JPL
249979	2001 VM_{51}	—	November 10, 2001	Socorro	LINEAR	·	4.9 km	MPC · JPL
249980	2001 VE_{78}	—	November 15, 2001	Kitt Peak	Spacewatch	·	3.4 km	MPC · JPL
249981	2001 VR_{101}	—	November 12, 2001	Socorro	LINEAR	PAD	3.5 km	MPC · JPL
249982	2001 VC_{102}	—	November 12, 2001	Socorro	LINEAR	·	2.0 km	MPC · JPL
249983	2001 VF_{125}	—	November 12, 2001	Socorro	LINEAR	EOS	3.1 km	MPC · JPL
249984	2001 WM_{18}	—	November 17, 2001	Socorro	LINEAR	·	2.7 km	MPC · JPL
249985	2001 WR_{23}	—	November 17, 2001	Kitt Peak	Spacewatch	AGN	1.5 km	MPC · JPL
249986	2001 WV_{28}	—	November 17, 2001	Socorro	LINEAR	·	3.0 km	MPC · JPL
249987	2001 WK_{51}	—	November 19, 2001	Socorro	LINEAR	·	2.3 km	MPC · JPL
249988	2001 WJ_{58}	—	November 19, 2001	Socorro	LINEAR	KOR	1.7 km	MPC · JPL
249989	2001 XS_{8}	—	December 9, 2001	Socorro	LINEAR	(18466)	1.7 km	MPC · JPL
249990	2001 XV_{48}	—	December 10, 2001	Socorro	LINEAR	·	2.7 km	MPC · JPL
249991	2001 XX_{65}	—	December 10, 2001	Socorro	LINEAR	·	3.9 km	MPC · JPL
249992	2001 XM_{90}	—	December 10, 2001	Socorro	LINEAR	·	2.4 km	MPC · JPL
249993	2001 XT_{92}	—	December 10, 2001	Socorro	LINEAR	AGN	1.4 km	MPC · JPL
249994	2001 XB_{111}	—	December 11, 2001	Socorro	LINEAR	GEF	3.7 km	MPC · JPL
249995	2001 XO_{128}	—	December 14, 2001	Socorro	LINEAR	L5	16 km	MPC · JPL
249996	2001 XC_{191}	—	December 14, 2001	Socorro	LINEAR	·	4.2 km	MPC · JPL
249997	2001 XE_{202}	—	December 11, 2001	Socorro	LINEAR	·	2.3 km	MPC · JPL
249998	2001 XO_{204}	—	December 11, 2001	Socorro	LINEAR	·	2.7 km	MPC · JPL
249999	2001 XC_{218}	—	December 15, 2001	Socorro	LINEAR	·	2.6 km	MPC · JPL
250000	2001 XB_{242}	—	December 14, 2001	Socorro	LINEAR	·	4.3 km	MPC · JPL

back to top

== See also ==
- Meanings of minor-planet names: 249001–250000
