= List of minor planets: 509001–510000 =

The following is a partial list of minor planets, running from minor-planet number 509001 through 510000, inclusive. The primary data for this and other partial lists is based on JPL's "Small-Body Orbital Elements" and data available from the Minor Planet Center. Critical list information is also provided by the MPC, unless otherwise specified from Lowell Observatory. A detailed description of the table's columns and additional sources are given on the main page including a complete list of every page in this series, and a statistical break-up on the dynamical classification of minor planets.

Also see the summary list of all named bodies in numerical and alphabetical order, and the corresponding naming citations for the number range of this particular list. New namings may only be added to this list after official publication, as the preannouncement of names is condemned by the Working Group for Small Bodies Nomenclature of the International Astronomical Union.

Near-Earth obj.	MBA (inner)	MBA (outer)	Centaur
Mars-crosser	MBA (middle)	Jupiter trojan	Trans-Neptunian obj.
Unclassified

== 509001–509100 ==
Designation			Discovery			Properties		Ref
Permanent	Provisional	Named after	Date	Site	Discoverer(s)	Category	Diam.	Ref
509001	2005 GF_{59}	—	April 4, 2005	Catalina	CSS	H	500 m	MPC · JPL
509002	2005 GF_{124}	—	March 16, 2005	Catalina	CSS	H	500 m	MPC · JPL
509003	2005 GW_{148}	—	April 11, 2005	Kitt Peak	Spacewatch	·	560 m	MPC · JPL
509004	2005 GR_{229}	—	March 10, 2005	Mount Lemmon	Mount Lemmon Survey	·	1.6 km	MPC · JPL
509005	2005 JR_{24}	—	May 3, 2005	Kitt Peak	Spacewatch	H	360 m	MPC · JPL
509006	2005 JU_{28}	—	May 3, 2005	Kitt Peak	Spacewatch	·	1.5 km	MPC · JPL
509007	2005 JV_{28}	—	May 3, 2005	Kitt Peak	Spacewatch	·	610 m	MPC · JPL
509008	2005 JM_{50}	—	May 4, 2005	Kitt Peak	Spacewatch	·	690 m	MPC · JPL
509009	2005 JF_{62}	—	May 9, 2005	Anderson Mesa	LONEOS	·	2.2 km	MPC · JPL
509010	2005 LD_{2}	—	May 3, 2005	Kitt Peak	Spacewatch	·	1.3 km	MPC · JPL
509011	2005 LU_{39}	—	June 13, 2005	Kitt Peak	Spacewatch	·	3.5 km	MPC · JPL
509012	2005 LE_{53}	—	June 13, 2005	Mount Lemmon	Mount Lemmon Survey	·	550 m	MPC · JPL
509013	2005 MX_{14}	—	June 29, 2005	Palomar	NEAT	·	730 m	MPC · JPL
509014	2005 MO_{22}	—	June 30, 2005	Kitt Peak	Spacewatch	EOS	2.1 km	MPC · JPL
509015	2005 MH_{28}	—	June 29, 2005	Kitt Peak	Spacewatch	·	570 m	MPC · JPL
509016	2005 ME_{38}	—	June 13, 2005	Mount Lemmon	Mount Lemmon Survey	·	1.5 km	MPC · JPL
509017	2005 MP_{48}	—	June 29, 2005	Kitt Peak	Spacewatch	H	490 m	MPC · JPL
509018 Wiese	2005 NE_{1}	Wiese	July 1, 2005	Needville	Needville	·	1.4 km	MPC · JPL
509019	2005 NZ_{7}	—	June 18, 2005	Mount Lemmon	Mount Lemmon Survey	·	2.1 km	MPC · JPL
509020	2005 NU_{18}	—	July 4, 2005	Mount Lemmon	Mount Lemmon Survey	·	2.2 km	MPC · JPL
509021	2005 NE_{42}	—	July 5, 2005	Kitt Peak	Spacewatch	·	1.0 km	MPC · JPL
509022	2005 NX_{76}	—	July 10, 2005	Kitt Peak	Spacewatch	·	2.4 km	MPC · JPL
509023	2005 NC_{88}	—	July 4, 2005	Kitt Peak	Spacewatch	·	2.1 km	MPC · JPL
509024	2005 PZ_{1}	—	August 1, 2005	Siding Spring	SSS	·	1.6 km	MPC · JPL
509025	2005 PR_{4}	—	August 7, 2005	Siding Spring	SSS	·	1.3 km	MPC · JPL
509026	2005 QJ_{17}	—	August 25, 2005	Palomar	NEAT	·	1.2 km	MPC · JPL
509027	2005 QF_{18}	—	August 25, 2005	Palomar	NEAT	MAS	760 m	MPC · JPL
509028	2005 QJ_{20}	—	August 26, 2005	Anderson Mesa	LONEOS	·	1.2 km	MPC · JPL
509029	2005 QL_{34}	—	August 25, 2005	Palomar	NEAT	·	1.1 km	MPC · JPL
509030	2005 QG_{42}	—	August 26, 2005	Anderson Mesa	LONEOS	·	1.3 km	MPC · JPL
509031	2005 QY_{59}	—	August 25, 2005	Palomar	NEAT	·	1.1 km	MPC · JPL
509032	2005 QW_{81}	—	August 29, 2005	Socorro	LINEAR	·	1.1 km	MPC · JPL
509033	2005 QK_{180}	—	August 27, 2005	Anderson Mesa	LONEOS	·	1.2 km	MPC · JPL
509034	2005 RZ_{42}	—	September 13, 2005	Kitt Peak	Spacewatch	NYS	970 m	MPC · JPL
509035	2005 SS_{19}	—	August 30, 2005	Kitt Peak	Spacewatch	·	2.2 km	MPC · JPL
509036	2005 SO_{35}	—	September 23, 2005	Kitt Peak	Spacewatch	V	790 m	MPC · JPL
509037	2005 SF_{53}	—	September 25, 2005	Catalina	CSS	NYS	930 m	MPC · JPL
509038	2005 ST_{72}	—	September 23, 2005	Kitt Peak	Spacewatch	·	2.5 km	MPC · JPL
509039	2005 SE_{87}	—	September 24, 2005	Kitt Peak	Spacewatch	MAS	530 m	MPC · JPL
509040	2005 SK_{120}	—	September 29, 2005	Kitt Peak	Spacewatch	·	930 m	MPC · JPL
509041	2005 SO_{127}	—	September 29, 2005	Mount Lemmon	Mount Lemmon Survey	·	2.2 km	MPC · JPL
509042	2005 SQ_{138}	—	September 25, 2005	Kitt Peak	Spacewatch	MAS	590 m	MPC · JPL
509043	2005 SF_{144}	—	September 25, 2005	Kitt Peak	Spacewatch	THB	2.0 km	MPC · JPL
509044	2005 SD_{151}	—	September 25, 2005	Kitt Peak	Spacewatch	·	2.5 km	MPC · JPL
509045	2005 SQ_{177}	—	September 29, 2005	Kitt Peak	Spacewatch	·	3.5 km	MPC · JPL
509046	2005 SP_{181}	—	September 29, 2005	Kitt Peak	Spacewatch	·	2.0 km	MPC · JPL
509047	2005 ST_{186}	—	September 29, 2005	Mount Lemmon	Mount Lemmon Survey	·	1.2 km	MPC · JPL
509048	2005 SG_{197}	—	September 30, 2005	Kitt Peak	Spacewatch	·	2.0 km	MPC · JPL
509049	2005 SQ_{237}	—	September 29, 2005	Kitt Peak	Spacewatch	·	1.1 km	MPC · JPL
509050	2005 SY_{242}	—	September 30, 2005	Mount Lemmon	Mount Lemmon Survey	THM	2.0 km	MPC · JPL
509051	2005 SH_{245}	—	September 30, 2005	Mount Lemmon	Mount Lemmon Survey	·	850 m	MPC · JPL
509052	2005 SS_{266}	—	September 1, 2005	Kitt Peak	Spacewatch	THB	2.1 km	MPC · JPL
509053	2005 SJ_{285}	—	September 25, 2005	Apache Point	A. C. Becker	·	2.4 km	MPC · JPL
509054	2005 SY_{289}	—	September 26, 2005	Kitt Peak	Spacewatch	NYS	880 m	MPC · JPL
509055	2005 SE_{290}	—	September 29, 2005	Kitt Peak	Spacewatch	·	2.4 km	MPC · JPL
509056	2005 TA_{15}	—	October 1, 2005	Cordell-Lorenz	D. T. Durig	·	820 m	MPC · JPL
509057	2005 TE_{31}	—	October 1, 2005	Kitt Peak	Spacewatch	NYS	810 m	MPC · JPL
509058	2005 TH_{46}	—	September 10, 2005	Anderson Mesa	LONEOS	·	1.2 km	MPC · JPL
509059	2005 TW_{70}	—	October 6, 2005	Mount Lemmon	Mount Lemmon Survey	·	930 m	MPC · JPL
509060	2005 TO_{86}	—	October 5, 2005	Socorro	LINEAR	·	980 m	MPC · JPL
509061	2005 TW_{91}	—	October 6, 2005	Catalina	CSS	·	1.0 km	MPC · JPL
509062	2005 TX_{96}	—	October 6, 2005	Mount Lemmon	Mount Lemmon Survey	EOS	1.6 km	MPC · JPL
509063	2005 TU_{102}	—	October 7, 2005	Mount Lemmon	Mount Lemmon Survey	NYS	890 m	MPC · JPL
509064	2005 TC_{114}	—	October 7, 2005	Kitt Peak	Spacewatch	·	890 m	MPC · JPL
509065	2005 TR_{114}	—	September 27, 2005	Kitt Peak	Spacewatch	·	2.8 km	MPC · JPL
509066	2005 TQ_{116}	—	October 7, 2005	Kitt Peak	Spacewatch	·	2.1 km	MPC · JPL
509067	2005 TG_{125}	—	October 7, 2005	Kitt Peak	Spacewatch	NYS	800 m	MPC · JPL
509068	2005 TN_{131}	—	September 29, 2005	Mount Lemmon	Mount Lemmon Survey	·	1.0 km	MPC · JPL
509069	2005 TN_{139}	—	October 8, 2005	Kitt Peak	Spacewatch	THM	1.9 km	MPC · JPL
509070	2005 TD_{153}	—	October 6, 2005	Kitt Peak	Spacewatch	·	1.2 km	MPC · JPL
509071	2005 TU_{182}	—	October 6, 2005	Anderson Mesa	LONEOS	·	3.0 km	MPC · JPL
509072	2005 TJ_{196}	—	October 10, 2005	Kitt Peak	Spacewatch	·	2.1 km	MPC · JPL
509073	2005 UM_{5}	—	October 27, 2005	Kitt Peak	Spacewatch	APO	260 m	MPC · JPL
509074	2005 UR_{11}	—	October 22, 2005	Kitt Peak	Spacewatch	·	740 m	MPC · JPL
509075	2005 UC_{15}	—	October 22, 2005	Kitt Peak	Spacewatch	·	3.1 km	MPC · JPL
509076	2005 UP_{19}	—	October 22, 2005	Kitt Peak	Spacewatch	·	2.8 km	MPC · JPL
509077	2005 UN_{21}	—	October 23, 2005	Kitt Peak	Spacewatch	V	420 m	MPC · JPL
509078	2005 US_{37}	—	October 24, 2005	Kitt Peak	Spacewatch	·	2.7 km	MPC · JPL
509079	2005 US_{44}	—	October 22, 2005	Kitt Peak	Spacewatch	·	860 m	MPC · JPL
509080	2005 UU_{62}	—	October 25, 2005	Mount Lemmon	Mount Lemmon Survey	·	1.0 km	MPC · JPL
509081	2005 UA_{63}	—	October 25, 2005	Mount Lemmon	Mount Lemmon Survey	·	1.9 km	MPC · JPL
509082	2005 UY_{99}	—	October 22, 2005	Kitt Peak	Spacewatch	·	990 m	MPC · JPL
509083	2005 UZ_{132}	—	October 25, 2005	Kitt Peak	Spacewatch	NYS	1.1 km	MPC · JPL
509084	2005 UF_{151}	—	October 26, 2005	Kitt Peak	Spacewatch	·	2.6 km	MPC · JPL
509085	2005 UB_{161}	—	October 22, 2005	Palomar	NEAT	·	1.4 km	MPC · JPL
509086	2005 UM_{161}	—	October 23, 2005	Catalina	CSS	·	1.0 km	MPC · JPL
509087	2005 UQ_{185}	—	October 25, 2005	Mount Lemmon	Mount Lemmon Survey	·	2.3 km	MPC · JPL
509088	2005 UY_{197}	—	October 25, 2005	Kitt Peak	Spacewatch	NYS	770 m	MPC · JPL
509089	2005 UP_{198}	—	October 25, 2005	Kitt Peak	Spacewatch	·	2.4 km	MPC · JPL
509090	2005 UW_{239}	—	October 25, 2005	Kitt Peak	Spacewatch	·	2.6 km	MPC · JPL
509091	2005 UA_{258}	—	October 25, 2005	Kitt Peak	Spacewatch	·	2.5 km	MPC · JPL
509092	2005 UB_{326}	—	October 4, 2005	Mount Lemmon	Mount Lemmon Survey	·	2.1 km	MPC · JPL
509093	2005 UY_{351}	—	October 29, 2005	Catalina	CSS	·	3.3 km	MPC · JPL
509094	2005 UX_{371}	—	October 1, 2005	Mount Lemmon	Mount Lemmon Survey	·	2.9 km	MPC · JPL
509095	2005 UU_{406}	—	October 1, 2005	Mount Lemmon	Mount Lemmon Survey	·	2.5 km	MPC · JPL
509096	2005 US_{419}	—	October 25, 2005	Kitt Peak	Spacewatch	·	1.9 km	MPC · JPL
509097	2005 UN_{422}	—	October 27, 2005	Mount Lemmon	Mount Lemmon Survey	·	2.3 km	MPC · JPL
509098	2005 UE_{443}	—	October 30, 2005	Socorro	LINEAR	·	960 m	MPC · JPL
509099	2005 UF_{463}	—	October 15, 2001	Apache Point	SDSS	NYS	1.3 km	MPC · JPL
509100	2005 UR_{476}	—	September 30, 2005	Mount Lemmon	Mount Lemmon Survey	·	970 m	MPC · JPL

== 509101–509200 ==
back to top

Designation			Discovery			Properties		Ref
Permanent	Provisional	Named after	Date	Site	Discoverer(s)	Category	Diam.	Ref
509101	2005 UZ_{520}	—	September 30, 2005	Kitt Peak	Spacewatch	·	1.4 km	MPC · JPL
509102	2005 VB_{7}	—	November 12, 2005	Socorro	LINEAR	AMO	460 m	MPC · JPL
509103	2005 VE_{97}	—	October 1, 2005	Mount Lemmon	Mount Lemmon Survey	VER	2.4 km	MPC · JPL
509104	2005 VF_{103}	—	October 25, 2005	Kitt Peak	Spacewatch	THB	1.7 km	MPC · JPL
509105	2005 VZ_{111}	—	November 6, 2005	Mount Lemmon	Mount Lemmon Survey	·	990 m	MPC · JPL
509106	2005 VP_{126}	—	October 1, 2005	Mount Lemmon	Mount Lemmon Survey	·	1.4 km	MPC · JPL
509107	2005 VY_{130}	—	November 1, 2005	Apache Point	A. C. Becker	·	2.4 km	MPC · JPL
509108	2005 VO_{137}	—	November 1, 2005	Kitt Peak	Spacewatch	·	1.1 km	MPC · JPL
509109	2005 WZ_{20}	—	November 12, 2005	Kitt Peak	Spacewatch	VER	2.5 km	MPC · JPL
509110	2005 WD_{27}	—	November 21, 2005	Kitt Peak	Spacewatch	·	870 m	MPC · JPL
509111	2005 WZ_{36}	—	November 22, 2005	Kitt Peak	Spacewatch	THM	2.0 km	MPC · JPL
509112	2005 WN_{44}	—	November 22, 2005	Kitt Peak	Spacewatch	THM	2.1 km	MPC · JPL
509113	2005 WT_{67}	—	November 22, 2005	Kitt Peak	Spacewatch	·	940 m	MPC · JPL
509114	2005 WT_{68}	—	November 12, 2005	Kitt Peak	Spacewatch	·	1.3 km	MPC · JPL
509115	2005 WW_{84}	—	October 30, 2005	Mount Lemmon	Mount Lemmon Survey	·	2.7 km	MPC · JPL
509116	2005 WY_{91}	—	November 25, 2005	Mount Lemmon	Mount Lemmon Survey	·	920 m	MPC · JPL
509117	2005 WQ_{99}	—	October 29, 2005	Mount Lemmon	Mount Lemmon Survey	·	2.8 km	MPC · JPL
509118	2005 WT_{126}	—	October 28, 2005	Kitt Peak	Spacewatch	NYS	1.0 km	MPC · JPL
509119	2005 WX_{177}	—	November 30, 2005	Kitt Peak	Spacewatch	MAS	690 m	MPC · JPL
509120	2005 WU_{210}	—	November 22, 2005	Kitt Peak	Spacewatch	MAS	710 m	MPC · JPL
509121	2005 XE_{4}	—	November 9, 2005	Kitt Peak	Spacewatch	·	1.2 km	MPC · JPL
509122	2005 XS_{90}	—	December 8, 2005	Kitt Peak	Spacewatch	·	2.9 km	MPC · JPL
509123	2005 YH_{71}	—	December 10, 2005	Kitt Peak	Spacewatch	·	1.0 km	MPC · JPL
509124	2005 YM_{110}	—	December 25, 2005	Kitt Peak	Spacewatch	·	710 m	MPC · JPL
509125	2005 YM_{159}	—	December 27, 2005	Kitt Peak	Spacewatch	·	1.1 km	MPC · JPL
509126	2005 YH_{160}	—	December 27, 2005	Kitt Peak	Spacewatch	HYG	2.2 km	MPC · JPL
509127	2005 YQ_{168}	—	December 29, 2005	Kitt Peak	Spacewatch	·	1.2 km	MPC · JPL
509128	2005 YB_{221}	—	November 1, 2005	Catalina	CSS	·	3.2 km	MPC · JPL
509129	2005 YA_{222}	—	December 21, 2005	Kitt Peak	Spacewatch	·	2.6 km	MPC · JPL
509130	2005 YM_{264}	—	December 25, 2005	Kitt Peak	Spacewatch	(5)	960 m	MPC · JPL
509131	2005 YB_{269}	—	December 25, 2005	Mount Lemmon	Mount Lemmon Survey	EUN	860 m	MPC · JPL
509132	2005 YF_{279}	—	November 28, 2005	Mount Lemmon	Mount Lemmon Survey	·	1.1 km	MPC · JPL
509133	2006 AK_{15}	—	January 5, 2006	Mount Lemmon	Mount Lemmon Survey	·	630 m	MPC · JPL
509134	2006 AN_{22}	—	January 5, 2006	Catalina	CSS	·	1.2 km	MPC · JPL
509135	2006 AB_{35}	—	November 30, 2005	Mount Lemmon	Mount Lemmon Survey	·	3.0 km	MPC · JPL
509136	2006 AH_{47}	—	December 25, 2005	Kitt Peak	Spacewatch	(5)	900 m	MPC · JPL
509137	2006 AQ_{73}	—	January 8, 2006	Mount Lemmon	Mount Lemmon Survey	·	1.1 km	MPC · JPL
509138	2006 AU_{75}	—	January 4, 2006	Kitt Peak	Spacewatch	·	1.2 km	MPC · JPL
509139	2006 AR_{76}	—	January 5, 2006	Mount Lemmon	Mount Lemmon Survey	·	880 m	MPC · JPL
509140	2006 AW_{77}	—	January 7, 2006	Mount Lemmon	Mount Lemmon Survey	L5	9.5 km	MPC · JPL
509141	2006 BF_{35}	—	January 22, 2006	Mount Lemmon	Mount Lemmon Survey	·	630 m	MPC · JPL
509142	2006 BH_{71}	—	January 23, 2006	Kitt Peak	Spacewatch	·	880 m	MPC · JPL
509143	2006 BY_{101}	—	January 23, 2006	Mount Lemmon	Mount Lemmon Survey	·	740 m	MPC · JPL
509144	2006 BF_{102}	—	January 23, 2006	Mount Lemmon	Mount Lemmon Survey	L5	11 km	MPC · JPL
509145	2006 BY_{107}	—	January 25, 2006	Kitt Peak	Spacewatch	·	990 m	MPC · JPL
509146	2006 BD_{110}	—	January 25, 2006	Kitt Peak	Spacewatch	(5)	1.0 km	MPC · JPL
509147	2006 BF_{116}	—	January 26, 2006	Kitt Peak	Spacewatch	(5)	750 m	MPC · JPL
509148	2006 BR_{117}	—	January 26, 2006	Mount Lemmon	Mount Lemmon Survey	(5)	700 m	MPC · JPL
509149	2006 BT_{126}	—	January 26, 2006	Kitt Peak	Spacewatch	·	1.0 km	MPC · JPL
509150	2006 BB_{208}	—	January 31, 2006	Catalina	CSS	·	1.1 km	MPC · JPL
509151	2006 BX_{247}	—	January 31, 2006	Kitt Peak	Spacewatch	(5)	970 m	MPC · JPL
509152	2006 BZ_{251}	—	January 31, 2006	Kitt Peak	Spacewatch	·	1.2 km	MPC · JPL
509153	2006 BJ_{274}	—	January 25, 2006	Kitt Peak	Spacewatch	(5)	910 m	MPC · JPL
509154	2006 CK_{18}	—	February 1, 2006	Mount Lemmon	Mount Lemmon Survey	·	740 m	MPC · JPL
509155	2006 CU_{46}	—	February 3, 2006	Kitt Peak	Spacewatch	·	900 m	MPC · JPL
509156	2006 DA_{14}	—	February 22, 2006	Catalina	CSS	·	1.5 km	MPC · JPL
509157	2006 DG_{39}	—	February 21, 2006	Mount Lemmon	Mount Lemmon Survey	JUN	930 m	MPC · JPL
509158	2006 DA_{43}	—	February 20, 2006	Kitt Peak	Spacewatch	·	1.2 km	MPC · JPL
509159	2006 DO_{53}	—	February 24, 2006	Mount Lemmon	Mount Lemmon Survey	(5)	940 m	MPC · JPL
509160	2006 DO_{93}	—	February 24, 2006	Kitt Peak	Spacewatch	·	1.0 km	MPC · JPL
509161	2006 DP_{99}	—	February 25, 2006	Kitt Peak	Spacewatch	·	1.0 km	MPC · JPL
509162	2006 DS_{99}	—	February 25, 2006	Kitt Peak	Spacewatch	·	1.1 km	MPC · JPL
509163	2006 DC_{119}	—	January 26, 2006	Kitt Peak	Spacewatch	·	740 m	MPC · JPL
509164	2006 DK_{155}	—	February 25, 2006	Kitt Peak	Spacewatch	·	910 m	MPC · JPL
509165	2006 EV_{6}	—	March 2, 2006	Kitt Peak	Spacewatch	·	920 m	MPC · JPL
509166	2006 EQ_{39}	—	March 4, 2006	Kitt Peak	Spacewatch	(5)	720 m	MPC · JPL
509167	2006 EB_{56}	—	March 5, 2006	Kitt Peak	Spacewatch	(5)	900 m	MPC · JPL
509168	2006 FJ_{18}	—	March 23, 2006	Kitt Peak	Spacewatch	·	1.5 km	MPC · JPL
509169	2006 FU_{23}	—	March 24, 2006	Mount Lemmon	Mount Lemmon Survey	·	870 m	MPC · JPL
509170	2006 GV_{3}	—	April 2, 2006	Kitt Peak	Spacewatch	·	1.1 km	MPC · JPL
509171	2006 GH_{55}	—	April 8, 2006	Kitt Peak	Spacewatch	·	1.1 km	MPC · JPL
509172	2006 HF_{28}	—	April 20, 2006	Kitt Peak	Spacewatch	·	2.3 km	MPC · JPL
509173	2006 HH_{45}	—	April 25, 2006	Kitt Peak	Spacewatch	RAF	670 m	MPC · JPL
509174	2006 HA_{70}	—	April 24, 2006	Kitt Peak	Spacewatch	·	1.3 km	MPC · JPL
509175	2006 HF_{71}	—	April 25, 2006	Kitt Peak	Spacewatch	·	1.0 km	MPC · JPL
509176	2006 HA_{72}	—	April 25, 2006	Kitt Peak	Spacewatch	·	990 m	MPC · JPL
509177	2006 HA_{78}	—	September 19, 2003	Palomar	NEAT	·	1.5 km	MPC · JPL
509178	2006 HQ_{83}	—	April 26, 2006	Kitt Peak	Spacewatch	·	1.3 km	MPC · JPL
509179	2006 HL_{152}	—	April 26, 2006	Catalina	CSS	BAR	1.2 km	MPC · JPL
509180	2006 HK_{153}	—	April 20, 2006	Kitt Peak	Spacewatch	·	520 m	MPC · JPL
509181	2006 JN_{47}	—	May 1, 2006	Kitt Peak	Spacewatch	·	1.7 km	MPC · JPL
509182	2006 JS_{52}	—	May 6, 2006	Mount Lemmon	Mount Lemmon Survey	·	1.5 km	MPC · JPL
509183	2006 JV_{53}	—	May 7, 2006	Mount Lemmon	Mount Lemmon Survey	·	1.3 km	MPC · JPL
509184	2006 KD_{26}	—	May 20, 2006	Kitt Peak	Spacewatch	EUN	1.2 km	MPC · JPL
509185	2006 KO_{46}	—	May 21, 2006	Mount Lemmon	Mount Lemmon Survey	·	1.5 km	MPC · JPL
509186	2006 KO_{49}	—	May 21, 2006	Kitt Peak	Spacewatch	AGN	1.1 km	MPC · JPL
509187	2006 KL_{54}	—	May 21, 2006	Kitt Peak	Spacewatch	·	1.1 km	MPC · JPL
509188	2006 KS_{58}	—	May 22, 2006	Kitt Peak	Spacewatch	·	1.8 km	MPC · JPL
509189	2006 KQ_{70}	—	May 22, 2006	Kitt Peak	Spacewatch	·	1.4 km	MPC · JPL
509190	2006 KT_{112}	—	May 31, 2006	Mount Lemmon	Mount Lemmon Survey	·	1.6 km	MPC · JPL
509191	2006 OC_{5}	—	July 21, 2006	Catalina	CSS	APO · PHA	500 m	MPC · JPL
509192	2006 OD_{7}	—	July 24, 2006	Socorro	LINEAR	AMO	500 m	MPC · JPL
509193	2006 OX_{19}	—	July 21, 2006	Socorro	LINEAR	fast	970 m	MPC · JPL
509194	2006 QQ_{108}	—	August 28, 2006	Catalina	CSS	·	2.7 km	MPC · JPL
509195	2006 QR_{185}	—	August 18, 2006	Kitt Peak	Spacewatch	H	480 m	MPC · JPL
509196	2006 RK_{23}	—	August 19, 2006	Kitt Peak	Spacewatch	·	810 m	MPC · JPL
509197	2006 RA_{37}	—	August 29, 2006	Kitt Peak	Spacewatch	DOR	2.6 km	MPC · JPL
509198	2006 RM_{48}	—	September 14, 2006	Kitt Peak	Spacewatch	·	850 m	MPC · JPL
509199	2006 RD_{71}	—	September 15, 2006	Kitt Peak	Spacewatch	·	600 m	MPC · JPL
509200	2006 RQ_{88}	—	September 15, 2006	Kitt Peak	Spacewatch	·	660 m	MPC · JPL

== 509201–509300 ==
back to top

Designation			Discovery			Properties		Ref
Permanent	Provisional	Named after	Date	Site	Discoverer(s)	Category	Diam.	Ref
509201	2006 RA_{99}	—	September 14, 2006	Kitt Peak	Spacewatch	·	2.8 km	MPC · JPL
509202	2006 RN_{101}	—	August 29, 2006	Anderson Mesa	LONEOS	·	850 m	MPC · JPL
509203	2006 RM_{104}	—	September 15, 2006	Apache Point	A. C. Becker	·	1.7 km	MPC · JPL
509204	2006 SF_{13}	—	September 17, 2006	Catalina	CSS	NAE	3.2 km	MPC · JPL
509205	2006 SY_{20}	—	August 21, 2006	Kitt Peak	Spacewatch	·	840 m	MPC · JPL
509206	2006 SR_{32}	—	September 17, 2006	Kitt Peak	Spacewatch	·	610 m	MPC · JPL
509207	2006 SY_{47}	—	September 19, 2006	Catalina	CSS	EOS	1.9 km	MPC · JPL
509208	2006 SC_{50}	—	September 19, 2006	La Sagra	OAM	NYS	980 m	MPC · JPL
509209	2006 SH_{80}	—	September 18, 2006	Kitt Peak	Spacewatch	·	630 m	MPC · JPL
509210	2006 ST_{126}	—	September 21, 2006	Anderson Mesa	LONEOS	·	2.5 km	MPC · JPL
509211	2006 SZ_{140}	—	September 25, 2006	Socorro	LINEAR	·	810 m	MPC · JPL
509212	2006 SA_{141}	—	August 28, 2006	Catalina	CSS	·	720 m	MPC · JPL
509213	2006 SK_{160}	—	September 23, 2006	Kitt Peak	Spacewatch	·	580 m	MPC · JPL
509214	2006 SK_{186}	—	September 18, 2006	Kitt Peak	Spacewatch	·	1.7 km	MPC · JPL
509215	2006 SK_{202}	—	September 17, 2006	Kitt Peak	Spacewatch	KOR	1.3 km	MPC · JPL
509216	2006 SR_{224}	—	September 26, 2006	Mount Lemmon	Mount Lemmon Survey	·	640 m	MPC · JPL
509217	2006 SY_{231}	—	September 18, 2006	Kitt Peak	Spacewatch	·	540 m	MPC · JPL
509218	2006 SW_{241}	—	August 18, 2006	Kitt Peak	Spacewatch	·	1.8 km	MPC · JPL
509219	2006 SZ_{250}	—	September 19, 2006	Kitt Peak	Spacewatch	·	1.2 km	MPC · JPL
509220	2006 SY_{262}	—	September 26, 2006	Mount Lemmon	Mount Lemmon Survey	·	630 m	MPC · JPL
509221	2006 SM_{272}	—	September 18, 2006	Anderson Mesa	LONEOS	·	800 m	MPC · JPL
509222	2006 SW_{296}	—	September 17, 2006	Kitt Peak	Spacewatch	·	570 m	MPC · JPL
509223	2006 SC_{315}	—	September 17, 2006	Kitt Peak	Spacewatch	·	680 m	MPC · JPL
509224	2006 SV_{329}	—	September 27, 2006	Kitt Peak	Spacewatch	·	1.4 km	MPC · JPL
509225	2006 SM_{331}	—	September 28, 2006	Kitt Peak	Spacewatch	H	440 m	MPC · JPL
509226	2006 SF_{344}	—	September 28, 2006	Kitt Peak	Spacewatch	·	690 m	MPC · JPL
509227	2006 SK_{374}	—	September 16, 2006	Apache Point	A. C. Becker	·	1.8 km	MPC · JPL
509228	2006 ST_{398}	—	September 17, 2006	Kitt Peak	Spacewatch	·	550 m	MPC · JPL
509229	2006 SR_{404}	—	September 30, 2006	Kitt Peak	Spacewatch	ERI	1.1 km	MPC · JPL
509230	2006 SB_{406}	—	September 18, 2006	Catalina	CSS	V	670 m	MPC · JPL
509231	2006 ST_{412}	—	September 30, 2006	Mount Lemmon	Mount Lemmon Survey	·	800 m	MPC · JPL
509232	2006 TS_{29}	—	October 12, 2006	Kitt Peak	Spacewatch	·	1.4 km	MPC · JPL
509233	2006 TK_{38}	—	September 26, 2006	Mount Lemmon	Mount Lemmon Survey	·	1.9 km	MPC · JPL
509234	2006 TW_{41}	—	October 12, 2006	Kitt Peak	Spacewatch	·	490 m	MPC · JPL
509235	2006 TG_{44}	—	September 26, 2006	Mount Lemmon	Mount Lemmon Survey	·	620 m	MPC · JPL
509236	2006 TB_{45}	—	October 12, 2006	Kitt Peak	Spacewatch	MAS	480 m	MPC · JPL
509237	2006 TE_{54}	—	October 2, 2006	Mount Lemmon	Mount Lemmon Survey	H	440 m	MPC · JPL
509238	2006 TV_{58}	—	October 13, 2006	Kitt Peak	Spacewatch	·	560 m	MPC · JPL
509239	2006 TX_{78}	—	October 12, 2006	Kitt Peak	Spacewatch	·	880 m	MPC · JPL
509240	2006 TE_{79}	—	September 27, 2006	Mount Lemmon	Mount Lemmon Survey	H	460 m	MPC · JPL
509241	2006 TX_{81}	—	October 13, 2006	Kitt Peak	Spacewatch	·	780 m	MPC · JPL
509242	2006 TR_{100}	—	October 2, 2006	Mount Lemmon	Mount Lemmon Survey	·	700 m	MPC · JPL
509243	2006 TV_{104}	—	October 2, 2006	Mount Lemmon	Mount Lemmon Survey	·	640 m	MPC · JPL
509244	2006 TU_{105}	—	September 30, 2006	Mount Lemmon	Mount Lemmon Survey	·	750 m	MPC · JPL
509245	2006 TJ_{126}	—	October 3, 2006	Mount Lemmon	Mount Lemmon Survey	·	800 m	MPC · JPL
509246	2006 TX_{126}	—	October 2, 2006	Mount Lemmon	Mount Lemmon Survey	·	2.5 km	MPC · JPL
509247	2006 US_{5}	—	October 16, 2006	Catalina	CSS	·	1.9 km	MPC · JPL
509248	2006 US_{8}	—	October 16, 2006	Kitt Peak	Spacewatch	MAS	440 m	MPC · JPL
509249	2006 UX_{14}	—	October 17, 2006	Mount Lemmon	Mount Lemmon Survey	·	2.5 km	MPC · JPL
509250	2006 UJ_{30}	—	September 28, 2006	Kitt Peak	Spacewatch	·	1.7 km	MPC · JPL
509251	2006 UC_{33}	—	March 13, 2005	Kitt Peak	Spacewatch	·	700 m	MPC · JPL
509252	2006 UT_{34}	—	September 26, 2006	Mount Lemmon	Mount Lemmon Survey	·	600 m	MPC · JPL
509253	2006 UF_{40}	—	October 16, 2006	Kitt Peak	Spacewatch	THM	1.7 km	MPC · JPL
509254	2006 UZ_{54}	—	October 2, 2006	Kitt Peak	Spacewatch	·	950 m	MPC · JPL
509255	2006 UW_{61}	—	September 28, 2006	Catalina	CSS	·	880 m	MPC · JPL
509256	2006 UF_{62}	—	September 27, 2006	Mount Lemmon	Mount Lemmon Survey	·	3.1 km	MPC · JPL
509257	2006 UE_{82}	—	October 2, 2006	Mount Lemmon	Mount Lemmon Survey	·	730 m	MPC · JPL
509258	2006 UP_{88}	—	September 30, 2006	Mount Lemmon	Mount Lemmon Survey	·	1.6 km	MPC · JPL
509259	2006 UC_{104}	—	September 26, 2006	Mount Lemmon	Mount Lemmon Survey	·	1.8 km	MPC · JPL
509260	2006 UF_{122}	—	September 30, 2006	Mount Lemmon	Mount Lemmon Survey	·	650 m	MPC · JPL
509261	2006 UZ_{140}	—	October 13, 2006	Kitt Peak	Spacewatch	·	1.6 km	MPC · JPL
509262	2006 UM_{142}	—	October 4, 2006	Mount Lemmon	Mount Lemmon Survey	·	1.6 km	MPC · JPL
509263	2006 UP_{156}	—	October 2, 2006	Mount Lemmon	Mount Lemmon Survey	KOR	1.4 km	MPC · JPL
509264	2006 UM_{159}	—	October 2, 2006	Mount Lemmon	Mount Lemmon Survey	·	660 m	MPC · JPL
509265	2006 US_{176}	—	September 14, 2006	Kitt Peak	Spacewatch	·	1.8 km	MPC · JPL
509266	2006 UO_{179}	—	September 30, 2006	Catalina	CSS	·	3.6 km	MPC · JPL
509267	2006 UD_{195}	—	October 20, 2006	Kitt Peak	Spacewatch	KOR	1.1 km	MPC · JPL
509268	2006 UE_{211}	—	October 19, 2006	Mount Lemmon	Mount Lemmon Survey	·	2.3 km	MPC · JPL
509269	2006 UL_{212}	—	October 23, 2006	Kitt Peak	Spacewatch	·	620 m	MPC · JPL
509270	2006 UP_{225}	—	September 19, 2006	Catalina	CSS	H	580 m	MPC · JPL
509271	2006 UD_{230}	—	October 21, 2006	Palomar	NEAT	·	1.7 km	MPC · JPL
509272	2006 UD_{239}	—	October 15, 2006	Kitt Peak	Spacewatch	·	800 m	MPC · JPL
509273	2006 UX_{243}	—	October 27, 2006	Mount Lemmon	Mount Lemmon Survey	·	690 m	MPC · JPL
509274	2006 UW_{252}	—	September 28, 2006	Mount Lemmon	Mount Lemmon Survey	EOS	1.3 km	MPC · JPL
509275	2006 US_{253}	—	October 15, 2006	Kitt Peak	Spacewatch	·	760 m	MPC · JPL
509276	2006 UK_{268}	—	October 16, 2006	Kitt Peak	Spacewatch	·	600 m	MPC · JPL
509277	2006 UE_{289}	—	October 3, 2006	Mount Lemmon	Mount Lemmon Survey	·	800 m	MPC · JPL
509278	2006 UL_{340}	—	October 20, 2006	Mount Lemmon	Mount Lemmon Survey	·	2.6 km	MPC · JPL
509279	2006 VP_{1}	—	October 2, 2006	Mount Lemmon	Mount Lemmon Survey	·	770 m	MPC · JPL
509280	2006 VQ_{4}	—	September 30, 2006	Mount Lemmon	Mount Lemmon Survey	·	1.3 km	MPC · JPL
509281	2006 VK_{10}	—	September 27, 2006	Mount Lemmon	Mount Lemmon Survey	EOS	1.6 km	MPC · JPL
509282	2006 VX_{13}	—	November 14, 2006	Socorro	LINEAR	H	760 m	MPC · JPL
509283	2006 VN_{18}	—	September 27, 2006	Mount Lemmon	Mount Lemmon Survey	·	730 m	MPC · JPL
509284	2006 VW_{21}	—	November 10, 2006	Kitt Peak	Spacewatch	H	450 m	MPC · JPL
509285	2006 VE_{32}	—	October 12, 2006	Kitt Peak	Spacewatch	·	650 m	MPC · JPL
509286	2006 VD_{33}	—	October 20, 2006	Kitt Peak	Spacewatch	·	750 m	MPC · JPL
509287	2006 VE_{48}	—	November 10, 2006	Kitt Peak	Spacewatch	·	2.9 km	MPC · JPL
509288	2006 VA_{50}	—	November 10, 2006	Kitt Peak	Spacewatch	·	2.0 km	MPC · JPL
509289	2006 VO_{54}	—	November 11, 2006	Kitt Peak	Spacewatch	·	580 m	MPC · JPL
509290	2006 VV_{58}	—	November 11, 2006	Kitt Peak	Spacewatch	NYS	650 m	MPC · JPL
509291	2006 VK_{59}	—	October 22, 2006	Mount Lemmon	Mount Lemmon Survey	EOS	1.8 km	MPC · JPL
509292	2006 VO_{59}	—	October 30, 2006	Mount Lemmon	Mount Lemmon Survey	H	420 m	MPC · JPL
509293	2006 VJ_{68}	—	November 11, 2006	Kitt Peak	Spacewatch	EOS	1.6 km	MPC · JPL
509294	2006 VU_{68}	—	November 11, 2006	Kitt Peak	Spacewatch	·	1.9 km	MPC · JPL
509295	2006 VL_{98}	—	November 11, 2006	Kitt Peak	Spacewatch	·	780 m	MPC · JPL
509296	2006 VQ_{105}	—	October 31, 2006	Mount Lemmon	Mount Lemmon Survey	·	2.3 km	MPC · JPL
509297	2006 VY_{108}	—	November 13, 2006	Kitt Peak	Spacewatch	H	420 m	MPC · JPL
509298	2006 VQ_{116}	—	September 27, 2006	Mount Lemmon	Mount Lemmon Survey	·	700 m	MPC · JPL
509299	2006 VX_{117}	—	September 27, 2006	Mount Lemmon	Mount Lemmon Survey	·	1.7 km	MPC · JPL
509300	2006 VB_{119}	—	October 13, 2006	Kitt Peak	Spacewatch	EOS	1.3 km	MPC · JPL

== 509301–509400 ==
back to top

Designation			Discovery			Properties		Ref
Permanent	Provisional	Named after	Date	Site	Discoverer(s)	Category	Diam.	Ref
509301	2006 VH_{127}	—	October 27, 2006	Catalina	CSS	·	2.5 km	MPC · JPL
509302	2006 VQ_{138}	—	October 21, 2006	Mount Lemmon	Mount Lemmon Survey	·	2.0 km	MPC · JPL
509303	2006 VR_{143}	—	August 27, 2006	Kitt Peak	Spacewatch	·	600 m	MPC · JPL
509304	2006 VY_{148}	—	October 21, 2006	Mount Lemmon	Mount Lemmon Survey	·	2.5 km	MPC · JPL
509305	2006 VE_{153}	—	October 16, 2006	Catalina	CSS	·	1.0 km	MPC · JPL
509306	2006 VK_{155}	—	October 4, 2006	Mount Lemmon	Mount Lemmon Survey	·	760 m	MPC · JPL
509307	2006 VX_{167}	—	October 2, 2006	Kitt Peak	Spacewatch	·	1.9 km	MPC · JPL
509308	2006 VU_{173}	—	November 15, 2006	Kitt Peak	Spacewatch	TEL	1.0 km	MPC · JPL
509309	2006 WJ_{1}	—	November 16, 2006	Kitt Peak	Spacewatch	T_{j} (2.91)	3.3 km	MPC · JPL
509310	2006 WD_{7}	—	November 16, 2006	Kitt Peak	Spacewatch	·	1.7 km	MPC · JPL
509311	2006 WK_{14}	—	November 16, 2006	Mount Lemmon	Mount Lemmon Survey	NYS	750 m	MPC · JPL
509312	2006 WP_{18}	—	November 17, 2006	Mount Lemmon	Mount Lemmon Survey	·	1.7 km	MPC · JPL
509313	2006 WP_{22}	—	November 17, 2006	Mount Lemmon	Mount Lemmon Survey	·	1.2 km	MPC · JPL
509314	2006 WG_{29}	—	October 19, 2006	Mount Lemmon	Mount Lemmon Survey	·	2.5 km	MPC · JPL
509315	2006 WO_{34}	—	November 12, 2006	Mount Lemmon	Mount Lemmon Survey	·	1.6 km	MPC · JPL
509316	2006 WL_{44}	—	October 23, 2006	Mount Lemmon	Mount Lemmon Survey	·	640 m	MPC · JPL
509317	2006 WO_{58}	—	September 28, 2006	Mount Lemmon	Mount Lemmon Survey	·	1.3 km	MPC · JPL
509318	2006 WZ_{76}	—	October 28, 2006	Mount Lemmon	Mount Lemmon Survey	·	2.3 km	MPC · JPL
509319	2006 WG_{97}	—	October 29, 2006	Mount Lemmon	Mount Lemmon Survey	·	700 m	MPC · JPL
509320	2006 WM_{97}	—	September 27, 2006	Mount Lemmon	Mount Lemmon Survey	MAS	480 m	MPC · JPL
509321	2006 WV_{104}	—	November 19, 2006	Kitt Peak	Spacewatch	VER	2.4 km	MPC · JPL
509322	2006 WM_{106}	—	November 19, 2006	Kitt Peak	Spacewatch	·	530 m	MPC · JPL
509323	2006 WA_{112}	—	November 19, 2006	Kitt Peak	Spacewatch	NYS	910 m	MPC · JPL
509324	2006 WL_{133}	—	November 18, 2006	Mount Lemmon	Mount Lemmon Survey	·	2.5 km	MPC · JPL
509325	2006 WR_{137}	—	October 31, 2006	Mount Lemmon	Mount Lemmon Survey	·	770 m	MPC · JPL
509326	2006 WL_{138}	—	September 27, 2006	Mount Lemmon	Mount Lemmon Survey	·	750 m	MPC · JPL
509327	2006 WO_{162}	—	November 11, 2006	Mount Lemmon	Mount Lemmon Survey	·	2.1 km	MPC · JPL
509328	2006 WX_{167}	—	October 31, 2006	Mount Lemmon	Mount Lemmon Survey	·	1.9 km	MPC · JPL
509329	2006 WP_{180}	—	November 24, 2006	Mount Lemmon	Mount Lemmon Survey	·	1.8 km	MPC · JPL
509330	2006 WR_{187}	—	November 1, 2006	Mount Lemmon	Mount Lemmon Survey	H	500 m	MPC · JPL
509331	2006 WC_{192}	—	November 11, 2006	Kitt Peak	Spacewatch	NYS	630 m	MPC · JPL
509332	2006 WJ_{199}	—	November 16, 2006	Kitt Peak	Spacewatch	·	690 m	MPC · JPL
509333	2006 XV	—	November 22, 2006	Kitt Peak	Spacewatch	·	1.8 km	MPC · JPL
509334	2006 XJ_{12}	—	November 11, 2006	Kitt Peak	Spacewatch	·	2.0 km	MPC · JPL
509335	2006 XR_{19}	—	December 1, 2006	Mount Lemmon	Mount Lemmon Survey	·	2.7 km	MPC · JPL
509336	2006 XE_{29}	—	November 19, 2006	Kitt Peak	Spacewatch	·	760 m	MPC · JPL
509337	2006 XC_{36}	—	November 16, 2006	Catalina	CSS	·	1.0 km	MPC · JPL
509338	2006 XV_{41}	—	December 12, 2006	Mount Lemmon	Mount Lemmon Survey	VER	2.4 km	MPC · JPL
509339	2006 XU_{71}	—	December 1, 2006	Mount Lemmon	Mount Lemmon Survey	·	3.1 km	MPC · JPL
509340	2006 YO_{12}	—	November 18, 2006	Mount Lemmon	Mount Lemmon Survey	·	1.0 km	MPC · JPL
509341	2006 YT_{16}	—	December 21, 2006	Mount Lemmon	Mount Lemmon Survey	·	3.0 km	MPC · JPL
509342	2006 YS_{18}	—	December 13, 2006	Mount Lemmon	Mount Lemmon Survey	·	2.2 km	MPC · JPL
509343	2006 YC_{22}	—	December 13, 2006	Kitt Peak	Spacewatch	·	760 m	MPC · JPL
509344	2006 YB_{30}	—	November 21, 2006	Mount Lemmon	Mount Lemmon Survey	·	2.1 km	MPC · JPL
509345	2006 YF_{32}	—	December 21, 2006	Kitt Peak	Spacewatch	EUP	2.9 km	MPC · JPL
509346	2006 YM_{32}	—	November 22, 2006	Mount Lemmon	Mount Lemmon Survey	·	1.0 km	MPC · JPL
509347	2006 YE_{35}	—	November 25, 2006	Mount Lemmon	Mount Lemmon Survey	·	940 m	MPC · JPL
509348	2006 YH_{45}	—	August 28, 2005	Kitt Peak	Spacewatch	·	2.1 km	MPC · JPL
509349	2006 YK_{45}	—	December 13, 2006	Mount Lemmon	Mount Lemmon Survey	·	1.7 km	MPC · JPL
509350	2006 YG_{51}	—	December 24, 2006	Kitt Peak	Spacewatch	T_{j} (2.98)	2.6 km	MPC · JPL
509351	2006 YV_{54}	—	December 21, 2006	Mount Lemmon	Mount Lemmon Survey	·	1.8 km	MPC · JPL
509352	2007 AG	—	January 8, 2007	Mount Lemmon	Mount Lemmon Survey	IEO · PHA	330 m	MPC · JPL
509353	2007 AT_{2}	—	January 10, 2007	Socorro	LINEAR	AMO	410 m	MPC · JPL
509354	2007 AU_{5}	—	November 17, 2006	Mount Lemmon	Mount Lemmon Survey	·	2.0 km	MPC · JPL
509355	2007 AY_{6}	—	December 21, 2006	Mount Lemmon	Mount Lemmon Survey	·	1 km	MPC · JPL
509356	2007 AR_{10}	—	December 13, 2006	Mount Lemmon	Mount Lemmon Survey	·	780 m	MPC · JPL
509357	2007 AZ_{19}	—	January 13, 2007	Vallemare Borbona	V. S. Casulli	LIX	3.0 km	MPC · JPL
509358	2007 AO_{23}	—	November 27, 2006	Mount Lemmon	Mount Lemmon Survey	·	900 m	MPC · JPL
509359	2007 AR_{29}	—	January 9, 2007	Mount Lemmon	Mount Lemmon Survey	·	840 m	MPC · JPL
509360	2007 AZ_{30}	—	January 10, 2007	Mount Lemmon	Mount Lemmon Survey	·	2.2 km	MPC · JPL
509361	2007 AR_{31}	—	January 10, 2007	Mount Lemmon	Mount Lemmon Survey	·	2.2 km	MPC · JPL
509362	2007 BZ_{4}	—	January 17, 2007	Kitt Peak	Spacewatch	·	1.9 km	MPC · JPL
509363	2007 BJ_{7}	—	January 23, 2007	Bergisch Gladbach	W. Bickel	NYS	1.3 km	MPC · JPL
509364	2007 BS_{11}	—	January 10, 2007	Kitt Peak	Spacewatch	·	870 m	MPC · JPL
509365	2007 BO_{12}	—	January 17, 2007	Kitt Peak	Spacewatch	·	930 m	MPC · JPL
509366	2007 BV_{18}	—	November 27, 2006	Mount Lemmon	Mount Lemmon Survey	·	830 m	MPC · JPL
509367	2007 BU_{20}	—	January 24, 2007	Socorro	LINEAR	H	540 m	MPC · JPL
509368	2007 BY_{22}	—	January 24, 2007	Mount Lemmon	Mount Lemmon Survey	NYS	880 m	MPC · JPL
509369	2007 BD_{37}	—	January 24, 2007	Mount Lemmon	Mount Lemmon Survey	·	2.6 km	MPC · JPL
509370	2007 BM_{42}	—	December 14, 2006	Mount Lemmon	Mount Lemmon Survey	·	2.1 km	MPC · JPL
509371	2007 BX_{45}	—	January 26, 2007	Kitt Peak	Spacewatch	MAS	650 m	MPC · JPL
509372	2007 BB_{67}	—	January 27, 2007	Mount Lemmon	Mount Lemmon Survey	·	880 m	MPC · JPL
509373	2007 BE_{69}	—	January 27, 2007	Mount Lemmon	Mount Lemmon Survey	·	1.4 km	MPC · JPL
509374	2007 BX_{69}	—	January 27, 2007	Mount Lemmon	Mount Lemmon Survey	TIR	2.9 km	MPC · JPL
509375	2007 BN_{71}	—	January 28, 2007	Mount Lemmon	Mount Lemmon Survey	·	2.0 km	MPC · JPL
509376	2007 BA_{73}	—	January 16, 2007	Catalina	CSS	H	520 m	MPC · JPL
509377	2007 BW_{75}	—	January 27, 2007	Kitt Peak	Spacewatch	MAS	620 m	MPC · JPL
509378	2007 BC_{78}	—	January 27, 2007	Kitt Peak	Spacewatch	NYS	970 m	MPC · JPL
509379	2007 BF_{79}	—	January 27, 2007	Kitt Peak	Spacewatch	NYS	910 m	MPC · JPL
509380	2007 BR_{85}	—	January 19, 2007	Mauna Kea	Mauna Kea	THM	2.0 km	MPC · JPL
509381	2007 BY_{99}	—	November 27, 2006	Mount Lemmon	Mount Lemmon Survey	·	2.3 km	MPC · JPL
509382	2007 CO_{1}	—	February 6, 2007	Kitt Peak	Spacewatch	LIX	2.6 km	MPC · JPL
509383	2007 CH_{9}	—	February 6, 2007	Kitt Peak	Spacewatch	·	1.2 km	MPC · JPL
509384	2007 CL_{9}	—	December 24, 2006	Kitt Peak	Spacewatch	·	2.0 km	MPC · JPL
509385	2007 CM_{11}	—	January 27, 2007	Kitt Peak	Spacewatch	·	3.3 km	MPC · JPL
509386	2007 CP_{16}	—	December 14, 2006	Kitt Peak	Spacewatch	·	2.2 km	MPC · JPL
509387	2007 CT_{23}	—	February 7, 2007	Palomar	NEAT	H	660 m	MPC · JPL
509388	2007 CD_{25}	—	December 21, 2006	Mount Lemmon	Mount Lemmon Survey	LUT	4.4 km	MPC · JPL
509389	2007 CR_{35}	—	January 17, 2007	Kitt Peak	Spacewatch	·	3.3 km	MPC · JPL
509390	2007 CT_{38}	—	January 10, 2007	Mount Lemmon	Mount Lemmon Survey	NYS	910 m	MPC · JPL
509391	2007 CH_{39}	—	January 27, 2007	Mount Lemmon	Mount Lemmon Survey	MAS	580 m	MPC · JPL
509392	2007 CA_{43}	—	November 27, 2006	Mount Lemmon	Mount Lemmon Survey	·	3.0 km	MPC · JPL
509393	2007 CP_{53}	—	January 28, 2007	Kitt Peak	Spacewatch	·	3.1 km	MPC · JPL
509394	2007 CV_{65}	—	February 10, 2007	Catalina	CSS	·	1.1 km	MPC · JPL
509395	2007 DH_{16}	—	February 17, 2007	Kitt Peak	Spacewatch	·	1.3 km	MPC · JPL
509396	2007 DH_{17}	—	February 17, 2007	Kitt Peak	Spacewatch	·	2.6 km	MPC · JPL
509397	2007 DX_{17}	—	February 17, 2007	Kitt Peak	Spacewatch	·	2.8 km	MPC · JPL
509398	2007 DX_{20}	—	January 28, 2007	Mount Lemmon	Mount Lemmon Survey	·	810 m	MPC · JPL
509399	2007 DW_{25}	—	February 17, 2007	Kitt Peak	Spacewatch	·	3.1 km	MPC · JPL
509400	2007 DG_{34}	—	February 17, 2007	Kitt Peak	Spacewatch	NYS	1.1 km	MPC · JPL

== 509401–509500 ==
back to top

Designation			Discovery			Properties		Ref
Permanent	Provisional	Named after	Date	Site	Discoverer(s)	Category	Diam.	Ref
509401	2007 DX_{38}	—	February 17, 2007	Kitt Peak	Spacewatch	MAS	660 m	MPC · JPL
509402	2007 DB_{51}	—	February 17, 2007	Kitt Peak	Spacewatch	·	2.7 km	MPC · JPL
509403	2007 DN_{55}	—	February 21, 2007	Kitt Peak	Spacewatch	·	1.1 km	MPC · JPL
509404	2007 DB_{59}	—	January 17, 2007	Kitt Peak	Spacewatch	·	3.1 km	MPC · JPL
509405	2007 DG_{74}	—	February 21, 2007	Mount Lemmon	Mount Lemmon Survey	V	570 m	MPC · JPL
509406	2007 DG_{79}	—	February 23, 2007	Kitt Peak	Spacewatch	·	960 m	MPC · JPL
509407	2007 DL_{81}	—	February 23, 2007	Mount Lemmon	Mount Lemmon Survey	·	1.1 km	MPC · JPL
509408	2007 DU_{82}	—	February 23, 2007	Socorro	LINEAR	·	3.3 km	MPC · JPL
509409	2007 DY_{94}	—	February 23, 2007	Kitt Peak	Spacewatch	L5	10 km	MPC · JPL
509410	2007 DS_{104}	—	February 8, 2007	Mount Lemmon	Mount Lemmon Survey	HYG	2.7 km	MPC · JPL
509411	2007 DF_{115}	—	February 23, 2007	Mount Lemmon	Mount Lemmon Survey	·	2.4 km	MPC · JPL
509412	2007 DC_{116}	—	February 26, 2007	Mount Lemmon	Mount Lemmon Survey	NYS	1.1 km	MPC · JPL
509413	2007 EO_{2}	—	March 9, 2007	Catalina	CSS	NYS	1.2 km	MPC · JPL
509414	2007 EF_{13}	—	March 9, 2007	Mount Lemmon	Mount Lemmon Survey	NYS	970 m	MPC · JPL
509415	2007 EE_{28}	—	February 21, 2007	Mount Lemmon	Mount Lemmon Survey	NYS	1.1 km	MPC · JPL
509416	2007 ED_{31}	—	January 28, 2007	Kitt Peak	Spacewatch	·	2.5 km	MPC · JPL
509417	2007 EG_{35}	—	March 11, 2007	Kitt Peak	Spacewatch	·	1.2 km	MPC · JPL
509418	2007 EN_{44}	—	March 9, 2007	Mount Lemmon	Mount Lemmon Survey	THM	2.1 km	MPC · JPL
509419	2007 EY_{46}	—	March 9, 2007	Mount Lemmon	Mount Lemmon Survey	MAS	630 m	MPC · JPL
509420	2007 EQ_{47}	—	March 9, 2007	Mount Lemmon	Mount Lemmon Survey	·	920 m	MPC · JPL
509421	2007 ES_{48}	—	March 9, 2007	Kitt Peak	Spacewatch	·	1.2 km	MPC · JPL
509422	2007 EM_{50}	—	March 10, 2007	Mount Lemmon	Mount Lemmon Survey	·	2.3 km	MPC · JPL
509423	2007 ED_{51}	—	March 10, 2007	Mount Lemmon	Mount Lemmon Survey	MAS	560 m	MPC · JPL
509424	2007 EV_{56}	—	March 11, 2007	Kitt Peak	Spacewatch	H	670 m	MPC · JPL
509425	2007 EQ_{67}	—	March 10, 2007	Kitt Peak	Spacewatch	MAS	630 m	MPC · JPL
509426	2007 EB_{70}	—	March 10, 2007	Kitt Peak	Spacewatch	NYS	1.1 km	MPC · JPL
509427	2007 EP_{91}	—	April 11, 1996	Kitt Peak	Spacewatch	NYS	890 m	MPC · JPL
509428	2007 ES_{93}	—	March 10, 2007	Mount Lemmon	Mount Lemmon Survey	MAS	480 m	MPC · JPL
509429	2007 EE_{99}	—	February 26, 2007	Mount Lemmon	Mount Lemmon Survey	NYS	1.1 km	MPC · JPL
509430	2007 EB_{104}	—	March 11, 2007	Mount Lemmon	Mount Lemmon Survey	MAS	610 m	MPC · JPL
509431	2007 EQ_{112}	—	March 11, 2007	Kitt Peak	Spacewatch	NYS	1.0 km	MPC · JPL
509432	2007 ET_{127}	—	March 9, 2007	Mount Lemmon	Mount Lemmon Survey	·	650 m	MPC · JPL
509433	2007 EV_{150}	—	March 12, 2007	Mount Lemmon	Mount Lemmon Survey	·	870 m	MPC · JPL
509434	2007 EM_{151}	—	February 26, 2007	Mount Lemmon	Mount Lemmon Survey	·	3.3 km	MPC · JPL
509435	2007 EB_{152}	—	February 26, 2007	Mount Lemmon	Mount Lemmon Survey	·	2.3 km	MPC · JPL
509436	2007 EO_{152}	—	March 12, 2007	Mount Lemmon	Mount Lemmon Survey	·	2.6 km	MPC · JPL
509437	2007 EG_{167}	—	February 23, 2007	Kitt Peak	Spacewatch	NYS	1.0 km	MPC · JPL
509438	2007 ER_{193}	—	January 17, 2007	Mount Lemmon	Mount Lemmon Survey	PHO	1.1 km	MPC · JPL
509439	2007 EO_{196}	—	March 15, 2007	Kitt Peak	Spacewatch	NYS	1.0 km	MPC · JPL
509440	2007 EC_{198}	—	March 15, 2007	Kitt Peak	Spacewatch	NYS	940 m	MPC · JPL
509441	2007 EQ_{219}	—	March 9, 2007	Kitt Peak	Spacewatch	NYS	1.1 km	MPC · JPL
509442	2007 EW_{225}	—	March 9, 2007	Kitt Peak	Spacewatch	NYS	1 km	MPC · JPL
509443	2007 FO_{24}	—	March 20, 2007	Mount Lemmon	Mount Lemmon Survey	·	2.5 km	MPC · JPL
509444	2007 GJ_{17}	—	April 11, 2007	Kitt Peak	Spacewatch	THB	2.6 km	MPC · JPL
509445	2007 GJ_{48}	—	April 14, 2007	Kitt Peak	Spacewatch	NYS	1.1 km	MPC · JPL
509446	2007 GC_{54}	—	March 15, 2007	Mount Lemmon	Mount Lemmon Survey	·	1.1 km	MPC · JPL
509447	2007 GE_{74}	—	March 16, 2007	Catalina	CSS	·	1.3 km	MPC · JPL
509448	2007 GH_{76}	—	April 11, 2007	Kitt Peak	Spacewatch	·	1.0 km	MPC · JPL
509449	2007 HE_{6}	—	March 17, 2007	Kitt Peak	Spacewatch	·	1.1 km	MPC · JPL
509450	2007 HB_{14}	—	March 13, 2007	Mount Lemmon	Mount Lemmon Survey	·	1.0 km	MPC · JPL
509451	2007 HT_{31}	—	April 19, 2007	Kitt Peak	Spacewatch	NYS	1.1 km	MPC · JPL
509452	2007 HF_{42}	—	April 22, 2007	Mount Lemmon	Mount Lemmon Survey	·	950 m	MPC · JPL
509453	2007 HD_{73}	—	April 14, 2007	Kitt Peak	Spacewatch	PHO	890 m	MPC · JPL
509454	2007 HF_{87}	—	April 24, 2007	Kitt Peak	Spacewatch	·	1.3 km	MPC · JPL
509455	2007 JC_{7}	—	April 11, 2007	Kitt Peak	Spacewatch	·	990 m	MPC · JPL
509456	2007 LF	—	June 7, 2007	Catalina	CSS	APO · PHA	270 m	MPC · JPL
509457	2007 LE_{5}	—	April 15, 2007	Mount Lemmon	Mount Lemmon Survey	·	2.2 km	MPC · JPL
509458	2007 LG_{23}	—	June 13, 2007	Kitt Peak	Spacewatch	·	1.6 km	MPC · JPL
509459	2007 LF_{33}	—	June 15, 2007	Kitt Peak	Spacewatch	T_{j} (2.97)	6.0 km	MPC · JPL
509460	2007 RD_{43}	—	September 9, 2007	Kitt Peak	Spacewatch	·	1.3 km	MPC · JPL
509461	2007 RB_{103}	—	September 11, 2007	Catalina	CSS	·	1.8 km	MPC · JPL
509462	2007 RS_{108}	—	September 11, 2007	Kitt Peak	Spacewatch	·	1.7 km	MPC · JPL
509463	2007 RP_{113}	—	September 11, 2007	Kitt Peak	Spacewatch	·	580 m	MPC · JPL
509464	2007 RE_{128}	—	September 12, 2007	Mount Lemmon	Mount Lemmon Survey	·	1.8 km	MPC · JPL
509465	2007 RX_{149}	—	September 2, 2007	Catalina	CSS	·	630 m	MPC · JPL
509466	2007 RC_{165}	—	September 10, 2007	Kitt Peak	Spacewatch	·	1.2 km	MPC · JPL
509467	2007 RS_{167}	—	August 24, 2007	Kitt Peak	Spacewatch	·	1.5 km	MPC · JPL
509468	2007 RS_{176}	—	September 10, 2007	Mount Lemmon	Mount Lemmon Survey	AGN	1.1 km	MPC · JPL
509469	2007 RJ_{182}	—	September 12, 2007	Mount Lemmon	Mount Lemmon Survey	·	1.5 km	MPC · JPL
509470	2007 RE_{253}	—	September 13, 2007	Mount Lemmon	Mount Lemmon Survey	·	610 m	MPC · JPL
509471	2007 RC_{264}	—	September 15, 2007	Mount Lemmon	Mount Lemmon Survey	·	1.4 km	MPC · JPL
509472	2007 RP_{277}	—	September 5, 2007	Catalina	CSS	T_{j} (2.97) · 3:2	7.0 km	MPC · JPL
509473	2007 RM_{286}	—	September 3, 2007	Catalina	CSS	DOR	2.4 km	MPC · JPL
509474	2007 RS_{295}	—	September 14, 2007	Kitt Peak	Spacewatch	·	1.4 km	MPC · JPL
509475	2007 RT_{320}	—	September 14, 2007	Mount Lemmon	Mount Lemmon Survey	·	2.0 km	MPC · JPL
509476	2007 SY_{6}	—	September 11, 2007	Kitt Peak	Spacewatch	·	1.8 km	MPC · JPL
509477	2007 SN_{7}	—	September 18, 2007	Kitt Peak	Spacewatch	·	1.5 km	MPC · JPL
509478	2007 SM_{22}	—	September 18, 2007	Catalina	CSS	·	1.6 km	MPC · JPL
509479	2007 TJ_{66}	—	October 7, 2007	La Sagra	OAM	·	2.3 km	MPC · JPL
509480	2007 TQ_{82}	—	September 10, 2007	Mount Lemmon	Mount Lemmon Survey	·	1.5 km	MPC · JPL
509481	2007 TA_{87}	—	October 8, 2007	Mount Lemmon	Mount Lemmon Survey	·	510 m	MPC · JPL
509482	2007 TB_{133}	—	October 7, 2007	Mount Lemmon	Mount Lemmon Survey	·	1.5 km	MPC · JPL
509483	2007 TE_{145}	—	October 11, 2007	Catalina	CSS	·	1.2 km	MPC · JPL
509484	2007 TN_{146}	—	October 6, 2007	Socorro	LINEAR	·	600 m	MPC · JPL
509485	2007 TW_{196}	—	August 23, 2007	Kitt Peak	Spacewatch	·	1.7 km	MPC · JPL
509486	2007 TS_{246}	—	October 9, 2007	Mount Lemmon	Mount Lemmon Survey	·	1.6 km	MPC · JPL
509487	2007 TV_{246}	—	October 9, 2007	Catalina	CSS	·	2.5 km	MPC · JPL
509488	2007 TD_{256}	—	October 10, 2007	Kitt Peak	Spacewatch	·	1.8 km	MPC · JPL
509489	2007 TP_{267}	—	October 9, 2007	Kitt Peak	Spacewatch	·	1.4 km	MPC · JPL
509490	2007 TU_{326}	—	October 11, 2007	Kitt Peak	Spacewatch	GEF	1.6 km	MPC · JPL
509491	2007 TR_{333}	—	September 10, 2007	Mount Lemmon	Mount Lemmon Survey	·	1.5 km	MPC · JPL
509492	2007 TX_{367}	—	October 10, 2007	Mount Lemmon	Mount Lemmon Survey	HOF	2.7 km	MPC · JPL
509493	2007 TJ_{389}	—	October 13, 2007	Catalina	CSS	·	1.7 km	MPC · JPL
509494	2007 TA_{397}	—	October 11, 2007	Catalina	CSS	·	2.0 km	MPC · JPL
509495	2007 TV_{422}	—	October 12, 2007	Kitt Peak	Spacewatch	·	400 m	MPC · JPL
509496	2007 TH_{426}	—	October 9, 2007	Mount Lemmon	Mount Lemmon Survey	·	1.7 km	MPC · JPL
509497	2007 TJ_{433}	—	October 9, 2007	Mount Lemmon	Mount Lemmon Survey	·	1.3 km	MPC · JPL
509498	2007 TV_{440}	—	October 8, 2007	Catalina	CSS	·	660 m	MPC · JPL
509499	2007 UT_{21}	—	October 7, 2007	Mount Lemmon	Mount Lemmon Survey	·	1.8 km	MPC · JPL
509500	2007 UH_{23}	—	October 8, 2007	Mount Lemmon	Mount Lemmon Survey	·	580 m	MPC · JPL

== 509501–509600 ==
back to top

Designation			Discovery			Properties		Ref
Permanent	Provisional	Named after	Date	Site	Discoverer(s)	Category	Diam.	Ref
509501	2007 UB_{50}	—	February 6, 1999	Mauna Kea	C. Veillet, J. Anderson	·	1.9 km	MPC · JPL
509502	2007 UK_{106}	—	October 31, 2007	Mount Lemmon	Mount Lemmon Survey	AGN	1.2 km	MPC · JPL
509503	2007 UO_{116}	—	October 8, 2007	Mount Lemmon	Mount Lemmon Survey	·	1.8 km	MPC · JPL
509504	2007 UX_{134}	—	October 30, 2007	Kitt Peak	Spacewatch	HOF	2.2 km	MPC · JPL
509505	2007 VL_{8}	—	November 5, 2007	Catalina	CSS	ATE	200 m	MPC · JPL
509506	2007 VY_{11}	—	November 5, 2007	XuYi	PMO NEO Survey Program	·	610 m	MPC · JPL
509507	2007 VQ_{32}	—	November 2, 2007	Kitt Peak	Spacewatch	HOF	2.3 km	MPC · JPL
509508	2007 VQ_{48}	—	November 1, 2007	Kitt Peak	Spacewatch	·	1.6 km	MPC · JPL
509509	2007 VL_{65}	—	November 1, 2007	Kitt Peak	Spacewatch	·	550 m	MPC · JPL
509510	2007 VP_{122}	—	November 5, 2007	Kitt Peak	Spacewatch	·	530 m	MPC · JPL
509511	2007 VA_{143}	—	October 20, 2007	Mount Lemmon	Mount Lemmon Survey	·	1.5 km	MPC · JPL
509512	2007 VK_{156}	—	November 5, 2007	Kitt Peak	Spacewatch	GEF	1.3 km	MPC · JPL
509513	2007 VW_{162}	—	November 5, 2007	Kitt Peak	Spacewatch	KOR	1.3 km	MPC · JPL
509514	2007 VG_{202}	—	November 5, 2007	Purple Mountain	PMO NEO Survey Program	·	1.5 km	MPC · JPL
509515	2007 VN_{289}	—	November 13, 2007	Mount Lemmon	Mount Lemmon Survey	·	1.8 km	MPC · JPL
509516	2007 VD_{307}	—	November 2, 2007	Kitt Peak	Spacewatch	·	610 m	MPC · JPL
509517	2007 VH_{313}	—	November 8, 2007	Kitt Peak	Spacewatch	·	450 m	MPC · JPL
509518	2007 VT_{328}	—	November 9, 2007	Mount Lemmon	Mount Lemmon Survey	·	550 m	MPC · JPL
509519	2007 VT_{330}	—	November 4, 2007	Kitt Peak	Spacewatch	·	550 m	MPC · JPL
509520	2007 WB	—	November 16, 2007	Catalina	CSS	APO	600 m	MPC · JPL
509521	2007 WX_{15}	—	November 3, 2007	Kitt Peak	Spacewatch	HOF	2.3 km	MPC · JPL
509522	2007 WA_{41}	—	October 10, 2007	Mount Lemmon	Mount Lemmon Survey	·	1.8 km	MPC · JPL
509523	2007 XP_{3}	—	December 4, 2007	Socorro	LINEAR	T_{j} (2.91) · APO	500 m	MPC · JPL
509524	2007 XU_{6}	—	November 8, 2007	Mount Lemmon	Mount Lemmon Survey	·	2.6 km	MPC · JPL
509525	2007 XJ_{19}	—	December 4, 2007	Catalina	CSS	H	590 m	MPC · JPL
509526	2007 XW_{42}	—	December 15, 2007	Kitt Peak	Spacewatch	·	600 m	MPC · JPL
509527	2007 XW_{58}	—	December 14, 2007	Mount Lemmon	Mount Lemmon Survey	EOS	1.9 km	MPC · JPL
509528	2007 XJ_{60}	—	August 29, 2006	Catalina	CSS	·	2.1 km	MPC · JPL
509529	2007 YG_{1}	—	December 16, 2007	Mount Lemmon	Mount Lemmon Survey	·	570 m	MPC · JPL
509530	2007 YG_{13}	—	December 17, 2007	Mount Lemmon	Mount Lemmon Survey	·	2.9 km	MPC · JPL
509531	2007 YS_{39}	—	December 17, 2007	Mount Lemmon	Mount Lemmon Survey	·	450 m	MPC · JPL
509532	2007 YK_{59}	—	December 6, 2007	Kitt Peak	Spacewatch	·	640 m	MPC · JPL
509533	2007 YG_{70}	—	December 30, 2007	Kitt Peak	Spacewatch	·	1.9 km	MPC · JPL
509534	2007 YK_{72}	—	December 18, 2007	Mount Lemmon	Mount Lemmon Survey	·	640 m	MPC · JPL
509535	2007 YY_{72}	—	December 19, 2007	Mount Lemmon	Mount Lemmon Survey	·	2.4 km	MPC · JPL
509536	2007 YL_{75}	—	December 19, 2007	Kitt Peak	Spacewatch	·	1.7 km	MPC · JPL
509537	2008 AN	—	January 1, 2008	Kitt Peak	Spacewatch	·	610 m	MPC · JPL
509538	2008 AN_{7}	—	December 30, 2007	Kitt Peak	Spacewatch	BRA	1.5 km	MPC · JPL
509539	2008 AO_{10}	—	January 10, 2008	Mount Lemmon	Mount Lemmon Survey	·	470 m	MPC · JPL
509540	2008 AW_{11}	—	January 10, 2008	Mount Lemmon	Mount Lemmon Survey	·	1.6 km	MPC · JPL
509541	2008 AF_{35}	—	January 10, 2008	Kitt Peak	Spacewatch	·	1.8 km	MPC · JPL
509542	2008 AG_{61}	—	January 11, 2008	Kitt Peak	Spacewatch	·	1.5 km	MPC · JPL
509543	2008 AD_{65}	—	January 11, 2008	Kitt Peak	Spacewatch	·	1.4 km	MPC · JPL
509544	2008 AD_{89}	—	December 31, 2007	Kitt Peak	Spacewatch	·	1.8 km	MPC · JPL
509545	2008 AQ_{100}	—	January 14, 2008	Kitt Peak	Spacewatch	H	450 m	MPC · JPL
509546	2008 AT_{101}	—	December 30, 2007	Kitt Peak	Spacewatch	·	1.6 km	MPC · JPL
509547	2008 AA_{107}	—	December 30, 2007	Kitt Peak	Spacewatch	·	1.2 km	MPC · JPL
509548	2008 AT_{114}	—	January 12, 2008	Catalina	CSS	H	690 m	MPC · JPL
509549	2008 AO_{127}	—	January 11, 2008	Kitt Peak	Spacewatch	·	2.2 km	MPC · JPL
509550	2008 AG_{134}	—	January 1, 2008	Kitt Peak	Spacewatch	·	1.4 km	MPC · JPL
509551	2008 BW_{11}	—	November 11, 2007	Mount Lemmon	Mount Lemmon Survey	(31811)	3.1 km	MPC · JPL
509552	2008 BA_{20}	—	June 15, 2005	Mount Lemmon	Mount Lemmon Survey	EOS	2.0 km	MPC · JPL
509553	2008 BG_{24}	—	January 10, 2008	Catalina	CSS	PHO	1.0 km	MPC · JPL
509554	2008 BS_{37}	—	December 30, 2007	Kitt Peak	Spacewatch	·	660 m	MPC · JPL
509555	2008 BK_{42}	—	January 31, 2008	Catalina	CSS	·	1.5 km	MPC · JPL
509556	2008 BS_{51}	—	January 17, 2008	Mount Lemmon	Mount Lemmon Survey	·	500 m	MPC · JPL
509557	2008 BK_{53}	—	January 20, 2008	Kitt Peak	Spacewatch	·	3.3 km	MPC · JPL
509558	2008 BT_{53}	—	January 30, 2008	Kitt Peak	Spacewatch	·	1.5 km	MPC · JPL
509559	2008 BY_{53}	—	January 31, 2008	Catalina	CSS	·	1.9 km	MPC · JPL
509560	2008 CG_{10}	—	February 2, 2008	Mount Lemmon	Mount Lemmon Survey	·	1.9 km	MPC · JPL
509561	2008 CU_{10}	—	February 3, 2008	Catalina	CSS	H	380 m	MPC · JPL
509562	2008 CW_{10}	—	February 3, 2008	Kitt Peak	Spacewatch	·	2.4 km	MPC · JPL
509563	2008 CG_{21}	—	February 7, 2008	Bisei SG Center	BATTeRS	·	590 m	MPC · JPL
509564	2008 CT_{27}	—	February 2, 2008	Kitt Peak	Spacewatch	·	1.6 km	MPC · JPL
509565	2008 CZ_{27}	—	January 13, 2008	Kitt Peak	Spacewatch	·	1.9 km	MPC · JPL
509566	2008 CB_{33}	—	February 2, 2008	Kitt Peak	Spacewatch	·	1.2 km	MPC · JPL
509567	2008 CJ_{41}	—	February 2, 2008	Kitt Peak	Spacewatch	·	600 m	MPC · JPL
509568	2008 CM_{48}	—	January 10, 2008	Mount Lemmon	Mount Lemmon Survey	·	2.3 km	MPC · JPL
509569	2008 CJ_{70}	—	February 9, 2008	Mount Lemmon	Mount Lemmon Survey	AMO	200 m	MPC · JPL
509570	2008 CQ_{79}	—	February 7, 2008	Kitt Peak	Spacewatch	·	1.4 km	MPC · JPL
509571	2008 CF_{87}	—	January 11, 2008	Mount Lemmon	Mount Lemmon Survey	·	600 m	MPC · JPL
509572	2008 CK_{87}	—	February 7, 2008	Mount Lemmon	Mount Lemmon Survey	·	2.4 km	MPC · JPL
509573	2008 CN_{91}	—	January 30, 2008	Mount Lemmon	Mount Lemmon Survey	·	570 m	MPC · JPL
509574	2008 CE_{98}	—	February 2, 2008	Kitt Peak	Spacewatch	·	1.6 km	MPC · JPL
509575	2008 CS_{98}	—	February 9, 2008	Kitt Peak	Spacewatch	·	710 m	MPC · JPL
509576	2008 CR_{128}	—	January 30, 2008	Mount Lemmon	Mount Lemmon Survey	·	650 m	MPC · JPL
509577	2008 CZ_{131}	—	February 8, 2008	Kitt Peak	Spacewatch	·	630 m	MPC · JPL
509578	2008 CR_{191}	—	February 2, 2008	Kitt Peak	Spacewatch	·	1.2 km	MPC · JPL
509579	2008 CT_{191}	—	February 2, 2008	Kitt Peak	Spacewatch	·	580 m	MPC · JPL
509580	2008 CW_{191}	—	February 2, 2008	Kitt Peak	Spacewatch	·	1.3 km	MPC · JPL
509581	2008 CM_{194}	—	February 11, 2008	Mount Lemmon	Mount Lemmon Survey	·	690 m	MPC · JPL
509582	2008 CX_{197}	—	February 10, 2008	Mount Lemmon	Mount Lemmon Survey	·	2.2 km	MPC · JPL
509583	2008 CA_{199}	—	February 13, 2008	Kitt Peak	Spacewatch	·	1.4 km	MPC · JPL
509584	2008 CS_{200}	—	February 8, 2008	Kitt Peak	Spacewatch	·	1.8 km	MPC · JPL
509585	2008 CE_{208}	—	February 8, 2008	Kitt Peak	Spacewatch	·	1.3 km	MPC · JPL
509586	2008 CJ_{212}	—	February 7, 2008	Mount Lemmon	Mount Lemmon Survey	H	540 m	MPC · JPL
509587	2008 DY_{17}	—	February 7, 2008	Kitt Peak	Spacewatch	·	590 m	MPC · JPL
509588	2008 DF_{21}	—	February 7, 2008	Mount Lemmon	Mount Lemmon Survey	·	510 m	MPC · JPL
509589	2008 DL_{22}	—	February 13, 2008	Kitt Peak	Spacewatch	H	470 m	MPC · JPL
509590	2008 DL_{24}	—	February 28, 2008	Mount Lemmon	Mount Lemmon Survey	·	590 m	MPC · JPL
509591	2008 DY_{24}	—	December 17, 2007	Mount Lemmon	Mount Lemmon Survey	·	770 m	MPC · JPL
509592	2008 DF_{25}	—	February 11, 2008	Mount Lemmon	Mount Lemmon Survey	·	780 m	MPC · JPL
509593	2008 DL_{35}	—	February 27, 2008	Kitt Peak	Spacewatch	·	570 m	MPC · JPL
509594	2008 DA_{38}	—	February 27, 2008	Mount Lemmon	Mount Lemmon Survey	·	1.1 km	MPC · JPL
509595	2008 DC_{66}	—	February 28, 2008	Kitt Peak	Spacewatch	·	750 m	MPC · JPL
509596	2008 DQ_{86}	—	February 26, 2008	Mount Lemmon	Mount Lemmon Survey	·	1.8 km	MPC · JPL
509597	2008 EZ_{8}	—	January 11, 2008	Mount Lemmon	Mount Lemmon Survey	·	1.8 km	MPC · JPL
509598	2008 EX_{9}	—	February 8, 2008	Mount Lemmon	Mount Lemmon Survey	VER	2.1 km	MPC · JPL
509599	2008 EW_{13}	—	March 1, 2008	Kitt Peak	Spacewatch	·	1.7 km	MPC · JPL
509600	2008 EO_{22}	—	February 6, 2008	Catalina	CSS	·	850 m	MPC · JPL

== 509601–509700 ==
back to top

Designation			Discovery			Properties		Ref
Permanent	Provisional	Named after	Date	Site	Discoverer(s)	Category	Diam.	Ref
509601	2008 EH_{24}	—	March 3, 2008	Mount Lemmon	Mount Lemmon Survey	·	2.5 km	MPC · JPL
509602	2008 ES_{62}	—	December 14, 2007	Mount Lemmon	Mount Lemmon Survey	·	3.4 km	MPC · JPL
509603	2008 EU_{63}	—	February 9, 2008	Catalina	CSS	·	1.5 km	MPC · JPL
509604	2008 EP_{67}	—	November 21, 2006	Catalina	CSS	·	2.8 km	MPC · JPL
509605	2008 ED_{70}	—	February 9, 2008	Catalina	CSS	PHO	690 m	MPC · JPL
509606	2008 ED_{76}	—	March 7, 2008	Kitt Peak	Spacewatch	·	2.4 km	MPC · JPL
509607	2008 EG_{88}	—	February 9, 2008	Kitt Peak	Spacewatch	·	1.6 km	MPC · JPL
509608	2008 ES_{91}	—	March 2, 2008	Catalina	CSS	·	1.1 km	MPC · JPL
509609	2008 ES_{102}	—	March 5, 2008	Mount Lemmon	Mount Lemmon Survey	·	620 m	MPC · JPL
509610	2008 EA_{136}	—	February 29, 2008	XuYi	PMO NEO Survey Program	V	650 m	MPC · JPL
509611	2008 ET_{144}	—	March 7, 2008	Mount Lemmon	Mount Lemmon Survey	·	520 m	MPC · JPL
509612	2008 ED_{152}	—	March 10, 2008	Kitt Peak	Spacewatch	·	670 m	MPC · JPL
509613	2008 EL_{158}	—	March 10, 2008	Kitt Peak	Spacewatch	NYS	780 m	MPC · JPL
509614	2008 EX_{158}	—	March 12, 2008	Mount Lemmon	Mount Lemmon Survey	·	530 m	MPC · JPL
509615	2008 EU_{166}	—	March 6, 2008	Mount Lemmon	Mount Lemmon Survey	·	700 m	MPC · JPL
509616	2008 FP_{6}	—	March 1, 2008	Mount Lemmon	Mount Lemmon Survey	·	3.3 km	MPC · JPL
509617	2008 FH_{8}	—	February 10, 2008	Kitt Peak	Spacewatch	·	1.6 km	MPC · JPL
509618	2008 FA_{10}	—	February 8, 2008	Kitt Peak	Spacewatch	·	1.4 km	MPC · JPL
509619	2008 FG_{14}	—	March 26, 2008	Mount Lemmon	Mount Lemmon Survey	·	1.5 km	MPC · JPL
509620	2008 FK_{20}	—	February 13, 2008	Mount Lemmon	Mount Lemmon Survey	·	2.6 km	MPC · JPL
509621	2008 FK_{21}	—	March 13, 2008	Kitt Peak	Spacewatch	·	600 m	MPC · JPL
509622	2008 FJ_{32}	—	January 11, 2008	Mount Lemmon	Mount Lemmon Survey	·	1.9 km	MPC · JPL
509623	2008 FQ_{32}	—	March 28, 2008	Mount Lemmon	Mount Lemmon Survey	·	970 m	MPC · JPL
509624	2008 FS_{37}	—	March 10, 2008	Mount Lemmon	Mount Lemmon Survey	·	2.2 km	MPC · JPL
509625	2008 FS_{44}	—	February 12, 2008	Kitt Peak	Spacewatch	·	1.6 km	MPC · JPL
509626	2008 FL_{53}	—	March 28, 2008	Mount Lemmon	Mount Lemmon Survey	THM	2.1 km	MPC · JPL
509627	2008 FC_{58}	—	February 13, 2008	Mount Lemmon	Mount Lemmon Survey	·	670 m	MPC · JPL
509628	2008 FJ_{72}	—	March 10, 2008	Mount Lemmon	Mount Lemmon Survey	HYG	2.4 km	MPC · JPL
509629	2008 FL_{73}	—	March 30, 2008	Kitt Peak	Spacewatch	·	480 m	MPC · JPL
509630	2008 FQ_{76}	—	March 27, 2008	Kitt Peak	Spacewatch	H	500 m	MPC · JPL
509631	2008 FN_{101}	—	March 30, 2008	Kitt Peak	Spacewatch	·	1.3 km	MPC · JPL
509632	2008 FR_{118}	—	March 31, 2008	Mount Lemmon	Mount Lemmon Survey	·	2.6 km	MPC · JPL
509633	2008 FG_{124}	—	March 29, 2008	Kitt Peak	Spacewatch	·	2.5 km	MPC · JPL
509634	2008 FY_{129}	—	March 28, 2008	Mount Lemmon	Mount Lemmon Survey	L5	11 km	MPC · JPL
509635	2008 FZ_{131}	—	March 28, 2008	Mount Lemmon	Mount Lemmon Survey	·	900 m	MPC · JPL
509636	2008 FL_{133}	—	March 10, 2008	Kitt Peak	Spacewatch	·	2.4 km	MPC · JPL
509637	2008 FZ_{133}	—	March 28, 2008	Kitt Peak	Spacewatch	·	2.0 km	MPC · JPL
509638	2008 FW_{135}	—	March 30, 2008	Socorro	LINEAR	·	1.8 km	MPC · JPL
509639	2008 FQ_{137}	—	March 31, 2008	Kitt Peak	Spacewatch	·	4.0 km	MPC · JPL
509640	2008 GP_{1}	—	February 28, 2008	Mount Lemmon	Mount Lemmon Survey	·	810 m	MPC · JPL
509641	2008 GV_{10}	—	April 1, 2008	Kitt Peak	Spacewatch	·	1.0 km	MPC · JPL
509642	2008 GV_{11}	—	April 1, 2008	Kitt Peak	Spacewatch	·	610 m	MPC · JPL
509643	2008 GK_{24}	—	March 4, 2008	Mount Lemmon	Mount Lemmon Survey	·	570 m	MPC · JPL
509644	2008 GS_{35}	—	March 30, 2008	Kitt Peak	Spacewatch	·	2.7 km	MPC · JPL
509645	2008 GQ_{39}	—	March 13, 2008	Kitt Peak	Spacewatch	·	1.9 km	MPC · JPL
509646	2008 GZ_{42}	—	April 4, 2008	Mount Lemmon	Mount Lemmon Survey	EOS	1.4 km	MPC · JPL
509647	2008 GC_{46}	—	March 29, 2008	Kitt Peak	Spacewatch	·	520 m	MPC · JPL
509648	2008 GQ_{49}	—	April 5, 2008	Kitt Peak	Spacewatch	·	850 m	MPC · JPL
509649	2008 GT_{50}	—	April 5, 2008	Mount Lemmon	Mount Lemmon Survey	·	2.1 km	MPC · JPL
509650	2008 GW_{54}	—	March 10, 2008	Kitt Peak	Spacewatch	·	870 m	MPC · JPL
509651	2008 GH_{60}	—	March 28, 2008	Kitt Peak	Spacewatch	ERI	1.4 km	MPC · JPL
509652	2008 GN_{60}	—	March 29, 2008	Catalina	CSS	H	430 m	MPC · JPL
509653	2008 GL_{66}	—	April 6, 2008	Kitt Peak	Spacewatch	·	4.0 km	MPC · JPL
509654	2008 GJ_{86}	—	March 4, 2008	Mount Lemmon	Mount Lemmon Survey	PHO	820 m	MPC · JPL
509655	2008 GX_{86}	—	March 31, 2008	Mount Lemmon	Mount Lemmon Survey	·	560 m	MPC · JPL
509656	2008 GL_{111}	—	March 12, 2008	Kitt Peak	Spacewatch	·	2.6 km	MPC · JPL
509657	2008 GS_{121}	—	March 28, 2008	Kitt Peak	Spacewatch	·	2.3 km	MPC · JPL
509658	2008 GV_{127}	—	April 14, 2008	Mount Lemmon	Mount Lemmon Survey	·	3.1 km	MPC · JPL
509659	2008 GL_{133}	—	April 3, 2008	Kitt Peak	Spacewatch	THM	2.2 km	MPC · JPL
509660	2008 GY_{136}	—	April 6, 2008	Kitt Peak	Spacewatch	VER	2.3 km	MPC · JPL
509661	2008 GE_{138}	—	January 28, 2007	Kitt Peak	Spacewatch	·	2.6 km	MPC · JPL
509662	2008 GG_{144}	—	April 3, 2008	Mount Lemmon	Mount Lemmon Survey	·	2.8 km	MPC · JPL
509663	2008 HY_{7}	—	April 24, 2008	Kitt Peak	Spacewatch	·	3.0 km	MPC · JPL
509664	2008 HW_{15}	—	April 25, 2008	Kitt Peak	Spacewatch	H	390 m	MPC · JPL
509665	2008 HM_{19}	—	April 14, 2008	Mount Lemmon	Mount Lemmon Survey	·	710 m	MPC · JPL
509666	2008 HN_{46}	—	April 15, 2008	Kitt Peak	Spacewatch	NYS	680 m	MPC · JPL
509667	2008 HY_{55}	—	April 29, 2008	Kitt Peak	Spacewatch	·	2.9 km	MPC · JPL
509668	2008 HJ_{60}	—	April 15, 2008	Mount Lemmon	Mount Lemmon Survey	·	2.3 km	MPC · JPL
509669	2008 HL_{66}	—	April 4, 2008	Kitt Peak	Spacewatch	·	680 m	MPC · JPL
509670	2008 HM_{66}	—	April 16, 2008	Catalina	CSS	PHO	860 m	MPC · JPL
509671	2008 JC_{7}	—	April 12, 2008	Mount Lemmon	Mount Lemmon Survey	·	2.4 km	MPC · JPL
509672	2008 JN_{11}	—	May 3, 2008	Kitt Peak	Spacewatch	·	1.1 km	MPC · JPL
509673	2008 JC_{23}	—	April 6, 2008	Kitt Peak	Spacewatch	EOS	1.8 km	MPC · JPL
509674	2008 JA_{28}	—	April 14, 2008	Mount Lemmon	Mount Lemmon Survey	·	2.5 km	MPC · JPL
509675	2008 KM_{4}	—	May 27, 2008	Kitt Peak	Spacewatch	·	2.7 km	MPC · JPL
509676	2008 KO_{42}	—	November 1, 2006	Catalina	CSS	H	670 m	MPC · JPL
509677	2008 LK	—	June 1, 2008	Kitt Peak	Spacewatch	H	410 m	MPC · JPL
509678	2008 LN_{10}	—	April 26, 2008	Kitt Peak	Spacewatch	·	3.1 km	MPC · JPL
509679	2008 LX_{17}	—	June 5, 2008	Siding Spring	SSS	·	1.1 km	MPC · JPL
509680	2008 MF_{2}	—	May 3, 2008	Mount Lemmon	Mount Lemmon Survey	·	980 m	MPC · JPL
509681	2008 OW_{5}	—	July 28, 2008	Dauban	Kugel, F.	(1547)	1.5 km	MPC · JPL
509682	2008 PO_{10}	—	May 29, 2008	Mount Lemmon	Mount Lemmon Survey	KON	2.1 km	MPC · JPL
509683	2008 PE_{21}	—	August 5, 2008	Siding Spring	SSS	·	1.4 km	MPC · JPL
509684	2008 PH_{22}	—	August 13, 2008	La Sagra	OAM	·	1.8 km	MPC · JPL
509685	2008 QH_{10}	—	August 26, 2008	La Sagra	OAM	(5)	1.1 km	MPC · JPL
509686	2008 QT_{28}	—	August 31, 2008	La Sagra	OAM	·	3.8 km	MPC · JPL
509687	2008 QD_{44}	—	August 28, 2008	La Sagra	OAM	·	1.9 km	MPC · JPL
509688	2008 QV_{45}	—	August 25, 2008	La Sagra	OAM	·	1.2 km	MPC · JPL
509689	2008 QW_{47}	—	August 23, 2008	Kitt Peak	Spacewatch	·	1.4 km	MPC · JPL
509690	2008 RV_{5}	—	September 2, 2008	Kitt Peak	Spacewatch	·	2.1 km	MPC · JPL
509691	2008 RU_{8}	—	September 3, 2008	Kitt Peak	Spacewatch	·	630 m	MPC · JPL
509692	2008 RT_{23}	—	September 5, 2008	Socorro	LINEAR	·	1.2 km	MPC · JPL
509693	2008 RA_{66}	—	September 4, 2008	Kitt Peak	Spacewatch	EUN	1.1 km	MPC · JPL
509694	2008 RE_{84}	—	September 4, 2008	Kitt Peak	Spacewatch	·	1.7 km	MPC · JPL
509695	2008 RF_{98}	—	September 9, 2008	Siding Spring	SSS	BAR	1.1 km	MPC · JPL
509696	2008 RQ_{98}	—	September 8, 2008	Siding Spring	SSS	·	1.8 km	MPC · JPL
509697	2008 RE_{99}	—	September 2, 2008	Kitt Peak	Spacewatch	L4	7.1 km	MPC · JPL
509698	2008 RB_{132}	—	September 6, 2008	Catalina	CSS	·	1.2 km	MPC · JPL
509699	2008 RL_{138}	—	September 6, 2008	Catalina	CSS	(5)	1.0 km	MPC · JPL
509700	2008 RG_{142}	—	September 6, 2008	Kitt Peak	Spacewatch	·	900 m	MPC · JPL

== 509701–509800 ==
back to top

Designation			Discovery			Properties		Ref
Permanent	Provisional	Named after	Date	Site	Discoverer(s)	Category	Diam.	Ref
509701	2008 SR_{4}	—	September 4, 2008	Kitt Peak	Spacewatch	·	1.3 km	MPC · JPL
509702	2008 SY_{22}	—	September 4, 2008	Kitt Peak	Spacewatch	·	1.2 km	MPC · JPL
509703	2008 SR_{30}	—	September 5, 2008	Kitt Peak	Spacewatch	·	1.3 km	MPC · JPL
509704	2008 SC_{55}	—	September 20, 2008	Mount Lemmon	Mount Lemmon Survey	·	1.1 km	MPC · JPL
509705	2008 SM_{56}	—	September 20, 2008	Mount Lemmon	Mount Lemmon Survey	·	1.5 km	MPC · JPL
509706	2008 SH_{58}	—	September 20, 2008	Kitt Peak	Spacewatch	MIS	1.9 km	MPC · JPL
509707	2008 SX_{66}	—	September 21, 2008	Mount Lemmon	Mount Lemmon Survey	·	1.7 km	MPC · JPL
509708	2008 SX_{67}	—	September 21, 2008	Catalina	CSS	·	1.3 km	MPC · JPL
509709	2008 SV_{72}	—	September 22, 2008	Mount Lemmon	Mount Lemmon Survey	EUN	1.2 km	MPC · JPL
509710	2008 SZ_{76}	—	August 24, 2008	Kitt Peak	Spacewatch	·	1.1 km	MPC · JPL
509711	2008 SX_{91}	—	September 21, 2008	Kitt Peak	Spacewatch	·	950 m	MPC · JPL
509712	2008 SM_{96}	—	September 21, 2008	Kitt Peak	Spacewatch	·	900 m	MPC · JPL
509713	2008 SZ_{105}	—	September 21, 2008	Kitt Peak	Spacewatch	·	940 m	MPC · JPL
509714	2008 SD_{108}	—	October 5, 2004	Kitt Peak	Spacewatch	·	1.0 km	MPC · JPL
509715	2008 SG_{119}	—	September 22, 2008	Mount Lemmon	Mount Lemmon Survey	·	1.1 km	MPC · JPL
509716	2008 SN_{130}	—	September 22, 2008	Kitt Peak	Spacewatch	(5)	920 m	MPC · JPL
509717	2008 SB_{132}	—	September 22, 2008	Kitt Peak	Spacewatch	·	860 m	MPC · JPL
509718	2008 SV_{141}	—	September 24, 2008	Mount Lemmon	Mount Lemmon Survey	·	940 m	MPC · JPL
509719	2008 SR_{155}	—	September 23, 2008	Socorro	LINEAR	·	1.2 km	MPC · JPL
509720	2008 SP_{157}	—	September 24, 2008	Socorro	LINEAR	(1547)	1.7 km	MPC · JPL
509721	2008 SP_{166}	—	September 28, 2008	Socorro	LINEAR	MIS	2.4 km	MPC · JPL
509722	2008 SU_{167}	—	September 5, 2008	La Sagra	OAM	·	1.7 km	MPC · JPL
509723	2008 SX_{180}	—	September 24, 2008	Kitt Peak	Spacewatch	·	1.1 km	MPC · JPL
509724	2008 SK_{187}	—	September 25, 2008	Kitt Peak	Spacewatch	CLA	1.2 km	MPC · JPL
509725	2008 SF_{203}	—	September 26, 2008	Kitt Peak	Spacewatch	·	910 m	MPC · JPL
509726	2008 SD_{207}	—	September 26, 2008	Kitt Peak	Spacewatch	·	1.5 km	MPC · JPL
509727	2008 SX_{207}	—	September 27, 2008	Catalina	CSS	H	800 m	MPC · JPL
509728	2008 SL_{211}	—	September 28, 2008	Mount Lemmon	Mount Lemmon Survey	·	1.3 km	MPC · JPL
509729	2008 SQ_{233}	—	September 28, 2008	Mount Lemmon	Mount Lemmon Survey	·	1.0 km	MPC · JPL
509730	2008 SX_{244}	—	September 4, 2008	Kitt Peak	Spacewatch	·	1.4 km	MPC · JPL
509731	2008 SJ_{251}	—	September 24, 2008	Kitt Peak	Spacewatch	·	1.2 km	MPC · JPL
509732	2008 SX_{254}	—	September 23, 2008	Catalina	CSS	·	1.4 km	MPC · JPL
509733	2008 SD_{265}	—	September 26, 2008	Kitt Peak	Spacewatch	·	980 m	MPC · JPL
509734	2008 SW_{268}	—	September 30, 2008	Mount Lemmon	Mount Lemmon Survey	·	1.2 km	MPC · JPL
509735	2008 SV_{274}	—	September 22, 2008	Kitt Peak	Spacewatch	·	950 m	MPC · JPL
509736	2008 SB_{284}	—	September 23, 2008	Catalina	CSS	·	1.1 km	MPC · JPL
509737	2008 SU_{295}	—	September 28, 2008	Catalina	CSS	BRU	1.6 km	MPC · JPL
509738	2008 SR_{301}	—	September 23, 2008	Kitt Peak	Spacewatch	RAF	730 m	MPC · JPL
509739	2008 TC_{12}	—	October 15, 2004	Kitt Peak	Spacewatch	·	940 m	MPC · JPL
509740	2008 TA_{20}	—	October 1, 2008	Mount Lemmon	Mount Lemmon Survey	·	970 m	MPC · JPL
509741	2008 TU_{31}	—	September 6, 2008	Mount Lemmon	Mount Lemmon Survey	JUN	750 m	MPC · JPL
509742	2008 TJ_{46}	—	October 1, 2008	Kitt Peak	Spacewatch	(5)	1.0 km	MPC · JPL
509743	2008 TX_{53}	—	October 2, 2008	Kitt Peak	Spacewatch	·	950 m	MPC · JPL
509744	2008 TR_{57}	—	October 2, 2008	Kitt Peak	Spacewatch	·	1.6 km	MPC · JPL
509745	2008 TW_{60}	—	September 22, 2008	Mount Lemmon	Mount Lemmon Survey	HNS	1.0 km	MPC · JPL
509746	2008 TX_{70}	—	September 23, 2008	Kitt Peak	Spacewatch	·	1.2 km	MPC · JPL
509747	2008 TE_{78}	—	September 2, 2008	Kitt Peak	Spacewatch	3:2 · SHU	3.6 km	MPC · JPL
509748	2008 TZ_{82}	—	October 3, 2008	Kitt Peak	Spacewatch	H	590 m	MPC · JPL
509749	2008 TC_{83}	—	October 3, 2008	Kitt Peak	Spacewatch	·	1.2 km	MPC · JPL
509750	2008 TL_{96}	—	October 6, 2008	Kitt Peak	Spacewatch	(5)	1.3 km	MPC · JPL
509751	2008 TA_{103}	—	September 28, 2008	Catalina	CSS	JUN	1.1 km	MPC · JPL
509752	2008 TH_{107}	—	September 23, 2008	Mount Lemmon	Mount Lemmon Survey	·	1.1 km	MPC · JPL
509753	2008 TO_{120}	—	September 3, 2008	Kitt Peak	Spacewatch	·	1.5 km	MPC · JPL
509754	2008 TY_{129}	—	October 8, 2008	Mount Lemmon	Mount Lemmon Survey	·	990 m	MPC · JPL
509755	2008 TH_{161}	—	October 2, 2008	Kitt Peak	Spacewatch	3:2 · SHU	5.2 km	MPC · JPL
509756	2008 TS_{163}	—	October 1, 2008	Kitt Peak	Spacewatch	·	1.3 km	MPC · JPL
509757	2008 TC_{165}	—	October 2, 2008	Kitt Peak	Spacewatch	3:2	4.7 km	MPC · JPL
509758	2008 TA_{169}	—	October 6, 2008	Mount Lemmon	Mount Lemmon Survey	·	1.1 km	MPC · JPL
509759	2008 TQ_{180}	—	September 23, 2008	Catalina	CSS	·	1 km	MPC · JPL
509760	2008 TA_{184}	—	October 3, 2008	Kitt Peak	Spacewatch	·	1.4 km	MPC · JPL
509761 Umberto	2008 UM	Umberto	October 19, 2008	Farra d'Isonzo	Farra d'Isonzo	·	1.7 km	MPC · JPL
509762	2008 UK_{13}	—	October 17, 2008	Kitt Peak	Spacewatch	(5)	980 m	MPC · JPL
509763	2008 UW_{31}	—	October 20, 2008	Kitt Peak	Spacewatch	EUN	1.1 km	MPC · JPL
509764	2008 UP_{32}	—	October 6, 2008	Mount Lemmon	Mount Lemmon Survey	·	1.1 km	MPC · JPL
509765	2008 UZ_{33}	—	October 20, 2008	Kitt Peak	Spacewatch	·	1.4 km	MPC · JPL
509766	2008 UA_{43}	—	October 20, 2008	Kitt Peak	Spacewatch	(5)	950 m	MPC · JPL
509767	2008 UQ_{46}	—	October 20, 2008	Kitt Peak	Spacewatch	·	1.3 km	MPC · JPL
509768	2008 UY_{47}	—	September 22, 2008	Kitt Peak	Spacewatch	·	850 m	MPC · JPL
509769	2008 UW_{69}	—	October 21, 2008	Mount Lemmon	Mount Lemmon Survey	·	1.1 km	MPC · JPL
509770	2008 UF_{77}	—	September 25, 2008	Mount Lemmon	Mount Lemmon Survey	MRX	1.0 km	MPC · JPL
509771	2008 UV_{90}	—	October 20, 2008	Mount Lemmon	Mount Lemmon Survey	·	1.3 km	MPC · JPL
509772	2008 UZ_{92}	—	September 29, 2008	Catalina	CSS	·	1.6 km	MPC · JPL
509773	2008 UX_{99}	—	September 6, 2008	Mount Lemmon	Mount Lemmon Survey	·	1.3 km	MPC · JPL
509774	2008 UV_{106}	—	September 26, 2008	Kitt Peak	Spacewatch	·	1.4 km	MPC · JPL
509775	2008 UD_{113}	—	October 22, 2008	Kitt Peak	Spacewatch	·	1.4 km	MPC · JPL
509776	2008 UN_{119}	—	October 22, 2008	Kitt Peak	Spacewatch	·	1.1 km	MPC · JPL
509777	2008 UN_{123}	—	October 22, 2008	Kitt Peak	Spacewatch	·	2.0 km	MPC · JPL
509778	2008 UG_{145}	—	October 23, 2008	Kitt Peak	Spacewatch	·	990 m	MPC · JPL
509779	2008 UE_{158}	—	October 23, 2008	Mount Lemmon	Mount Lemmon Survey	JUN	720 m	MPC · JPL
509780	2008 UF_{174}	—	October 24, 2008	Kitt Peak	Spacewatch	·	970 m	MPC · JPL
509781	2008 US_{176}	—	September 26, 2008	Kitt Peak	Spacewatch	·	1.1 km	MPC · JPL
509782	2008 UF_{178}	—	October 24, 2008	Mount Lemmon	Mount Lemmon Survey	·	1.5 km	MPC · JPL
509783	2008 UX_{182}	—	October 24, 2008	Mount Lemmon	Mount Lemmon Survey	·	1.5 km	MPC · JPL
509784	2008 UR_{185}	—	September 27, 2008	Mount Lemmon	Mount Lemmon Survey	·	1.1 km	MPC · JPL
509785	2008 UW_{193}	—	October 25, 2008	Mount Lemmon	Mount Lemmon Survey	·	2.3 km	MPC · JPL
509786	2008 UR_{205}	—	October 21, 2008	Kitt Peak	Spacewatch	·	1.2 km	MPC · JPL
509787	2008 UU_{229}	—	October 25, 2008	Kitt Peak	Spacewatch	·	1.2 km	MPC · JPL
509788	2008 UM_{230}	—	October 6, 2008	Mount Lemmon	Mount Lemmon Survey	·	1.1 km	MPC · JPL
509789	2008 UK_{231}	—	October 26, 2008	Kitt Peak	Spacewatch	·	1.2 km	MPC · JPL
509790	2008 US_{238}	—	October 26, 2008	Kitt Peak	Spacewatch	·	1.4 km	MPC · JPL
509791	2008 UY_{241}	—	September 7, 2008	Catalina	CSS	·	1.4 km	MPC · JPL
509792	2008 UK_{242}	—	September 29, 2008	Catalina	CSS	·	2.0 km	MPC · JPL
509793	2008 UO_{247}	—	October 26, 2008	Kitt Peak	Spacewatch	·	1.0 km	MPC · JPL
509794	2008 UX_{254}	—	October 27, 2008	Kitt Peak	Spacewatch	·	1.1 km	MPC · JPL
509795	2008 UB_{257}	—	October 27, 2008	Mount Lemmon	Mount Lemmon Survey	EUN	1.2 km	MPC · JPL
509796	2008 UK_{259}	—	September 29, 2008	Catalina	CSS	·	1.7 km	MPC · JPL
509797	2008 UQ_{291}	—	October 29, 2008	Kitt Peak	Spacewatch	(5)	880 m	MPC · JPL
509798	2008 UQ_{298}	—	October 29, 2008	Kitt Peak	Spacewatch	·	1.5 km	MPC · JPL
509799	2008 UJ_{303}	—	September 22, 2008	Mount Lemmon	Mount Lemmon Survey	·	1.5 km	MPC · JPL
509800	2008 US_{308}	—	October 30, 2008	Kitt Peak	Spacewatch	·	1.2 km	MPC · JPL

== 509801–509900 ==
back to top

Designation			Discovery			Properties		Ref
Permanent	Provisional	Named after	Date	Site	Discoverer(s)	Category	Diam.	Ref
509801	2008 UX_{337}	—	October 20, 2008	Kitt Peak	Spacewatch	·	1.4 km	MPC · JPL
509802	2008 UT_{351}	—	October 25, 2008	Socorro	LINEAR	EUN	1.0 km	MPC · JPL
509803	2008 UX_{352}	—	October 28, 2008	Kitt Peak	Spacewatch	·	1.6 km	MPC · JPL
509804	2008 UL_{359}	—	October 27, 2008	Mount Lemmon	Mount Lemmon Survey	·	1.4 km	MPC · JPL
509805	2008 UM_{360}	—	October 26, 2008	Kitt Peak	Spacewatch	(1547)	1.7 km	MPC · JPL
509806	2008 VA	—	November 2, 2008	Catalina	CSS	·	430 m	MPC · JPL
509807	2008 VT_{2}	—	November 2, 2008	Socorro	LINEAR	·	1.9 km	MPC · JPL
509808	2008 VA_{5}	—	October 5, 2008	La Sagra	OAM	·	1.5 km	MPC · JPL
509809	2008 VA_{11}	—	November 2, 2008	Mount Lemmon	Mount Lemmon Survey	·	1.2 km	MPC · JPL
509810	2008 VD_{14}	—	October 24, 2008	Catalina	CSS	·	2.1 km	MPC · JPL
509811	2008 VA_{22}	—	October 7, 2008	Mount Lemmon	Mount Lemmon Survey	·	1.4 km	MPC · JPL
509812	2008 VD_{32}	—	October 6, 2008	Mount Lemmon	Mount Lemmon Survey	KON	2.4 km	MPC · JPL
509813	2008 VM_{48}	—	November 3, 2008	Kitt Peak	Spacewatch	·	1.1 km	MPC · JPL
509814	2008 VQ_{66}	—	November 3, 2008	Catalina	CSS	·	1.6 km	MPC · JPL
509815	2008 VP_{71}	—	November 8, 2008	Kitt Peak	Spacewatch	·	1.2 km	MPC · JPL
509816	2008 VT_{81}	—	November 7, 2008	Mount Lemmon	Mount Lemmon Survey	·	1.2 km	MPC · JPL
509817	2008 WF_{1}	—	October 25, 2008	Catalina	CSS	·	1.3 km	MPC · JPL
509818	2008 WG_{36}	—	October 24, 2008	Kitt Peak	Spacewatch	·	1.2 km	MPC · JPL
509819	2008 WY_{39}	—	November 17, 2008	Kitt Peak	Spacewatch	·	1.0 km	MPC · JPL
509820	2008 WD_{47}	—	October 26, 2008	Kitt Peak	Spacewatch	·	1.3 km	MPC · JPL
509821	2008 WQ_{63}	—	November 22, 2008	Kitt Peak	Spacewatch	APO · PHA	320 m	MPC · JPL
509822	2008 WP_{73}	—	November 19, 2008	Mount Lemmon	Mount Lemmon Survey	·	1.5 km	MPC · JPL
509823	2008 WA_{74}	—	November 19, 2008	Mount Lemmon	Mount Lemmon Survey	·	1.6 km	MPC · JPL
509824	2008 WT_{84}	—	November 20, 2008	Kitt Peak	Spacewatch	·	1.4 km	MPC · JPL
509825	2008 WO_{99}	—	November 18, 2008	Kitt Peak	Spacewatch	·	1.4 km	MPC · JPL
509826	2008 WE_{110}	—	November 30, 2008	Kitt Peak	Spacewatch	·	1.2 km	MPC · JPL
509827	2008 WK_{111}	—	November 8, 2008	Kitt Peak	Spacewatch	PAD	1.4 km	MPC · JPL
509828	2008 WA_{136}	—	November 19, 2008	Kitt Peak	Spacewatch	·	1.4 km	MPC · JPL
509829	2008 WZ_{138}	—	November 30, 2008	Socorro	LINEAR	EUN	1.2 km	MPC · JPL
509830	2008 XQ_{1}	—	October 23, 2008	Kitt Peak	Spacewatch	·	1.6 km	MPC · JPL
509831	2008 XC_{6}	—	December 4, 2008	Socorro	LINEAR	·	1.4 km	MPC · JPL
509832	2008 XQ_{7}	—	November 20, 2008	Kitt Peak	Spacewatch	·	1.2 km	MPC · JPL
509833	2008 XK_{41}	—	December 2, 2008	Mount Lemmon	Mount Lemmon Survey	JUN	860 m	MPC · JPL
509834	2008 XL_{46}	—	September 3, 2008	Kitt Peak	Spacewatch	·	2.2 km	MPC · JPL
509835	2008 XJ_{47}	—	December 1, 2008	Mount Lemmon	Mount Lemmon Survey	·	2.0 km	MPC · JPL
509836	2008 YA_{5}	—	December 21, 2008	Kitt Peak	Spacewatch	·	1.2 km	MPC · JPL
509837	2008 YJ_{17}	—	December 21, 2008	Mount Lemmon	Mount Lemmon Survey	DOR	1.9 km	MPC · JPL
509838	2008 YQ_{20}	—	December 21, 2008	Mount Lemmon	Mount Lemmon Survey	·	1.5 km	MPC · JPL
509839	2008 YY_{22}	—	December 21, 2008	Mount Lemmon	Mount Lemmon Survey	·	2.2 km	MPC · JPL
509840	2008 YS_{41}	—	November 20, 2008	Kitt Peak	Spacewatch	·	1.5 km	MPC · JPL
509841	2008 YO_{50}	—	December 21, 2008	Kitt Peak	Spacewatch	GEF	1.0 km	MPC · JPL
509842	2008 YX_{50}	—	December 21, 2008	Kitt Peak	Spacewatch	·	1.6 km	MPC · JPL
509843	2008 YK_{55}	—	December 29, 2008	Mount Lemmon	Mount Lemmon Survey	·	1.8 km	MPC · JPL
509844	2008 YX_{65}	—	December 31, 2008	Kitt Peak	Spacewatch	·	1.2 km	MPC · JPL
509845	2008 YV_{74}	—	December 22, 2008	Kitt Peak	Spacewatch	·	1.3 km	MPC · JPL
509846	2008 YF_{75}	—	December 30, 2008	Mount Lemmon	Mount Lemmon Survey	·	1.8 km	MPC · JPL
509847	2008 YX_{87}	—	November 30, 2008	Socorro	LINEAR	EUN	1.4 km	MPC · JPL
509848	2008 YQ_{96}	—	December 29, 2008	Mount Lemmon	Mount Lemmon Survey	·	1.3 km	MPC · JPL
509849	2008 YJ_{98}	—	December 29, 2008	Kitt Peak	Spacewatch	WIT	870 m	MPC · JPL
509850	2008 YM_{101}	—	December 29, 2008	Kitt Peak	Spacewatch	GEF	1.0 km	MPC · JPL
509851	2008 YE_{102}	—	December 29, 2008	Kitt Peak	Spacewatch	·	1.2 km	MPC · JPL
509852	2008 YR_{105}	—	December 29, 2008	Kitt Peak	Spacewatch	·	2.2 km	MPC · JPL
509853	2008 YE_{111}	—	December 31, 2008	Kitt Peak	Spacewatch	·	1.3 km	MPC · JPL
509854	2008 YF_{111}	—	December 4, 2008	Kitt Peak	Spacewatch	·	1.5 km	MPC · JPL
509855	2008 YB_{123}	—	December 30, 2008	Kitt Peak	Spacewatch	·	1.6 km	MPC · JPL
509856	2008 YM_{133}	—	December 29, 2008	Kitt Peak	Spacewatch	·	1.2 km	MPC · JPL
509857	2008 YL_{137}	—	December 30, 2008	Kitt Peak	Spacewatch	·	1.7 km	MPC · JPL
509858	2008 YU_{139}	—	December 30, 2008	Kitt Peak	Spacewatch	·	1.2 km	MPC · JPL
509859	2008 YT_{161}	—	December 21, 2008	Mount Lemmon	Mount Lemmon Survey	GEF	980 m	MPC · JPL
509860	2008 YA_{166}	—	December 21, 2008	Catalina	CSS	JUN	880 m	MPC · JPL
509861	2008 YG_{166}	—	December 19, 2008	Socorro	LINEAR	·	1.5 km	MPC · JPL
509862	2008 YC_{170}	—	December 22, 2008	Kitt Peak	Spacewatch	AEO	970 m	MPC · JPL
509863	2008 YO_{171}	—	December 31, 2008	Kitt Peak	Spacewatch	·	2.5 km	MPC · JPL
509864	2009 AO_{2}	—	December 1, 2008	Kitt Peak	Spacewatch	·	1.7 km	MPC · JPL
509865	2009 AO_{26}	—	December 21, 2008	Mount Lemmon	Mount Lemmon Survey	·	2.1 km	MPC · JPL
509866	2009 AZ_{27}	—	December 21, 2008	Kitt Peak	Spacewatch	·	1.8 km	MPC · JPL
509867	2009 AR_{31}	—	January 15, 2009	Kitt Peak	Spacewatch	(13314)	1.5 km	MPC · JPL
509868	2009 AH_{40}	—	December 22, 2008	Kitt Peak	Spacewatch	·	910 m	MPC · JPL
509869	2009 AJ_{41}	—	December 3, 2008	Kitt Peak	Spacewatch	·	2.0 km	MPC · JPL
509870	2009 AF_{46}	—	January 7, 2009	Kitt Peak	Spacewatch	DOR	2.2 km	MPC · JPL
509871	2009 BX_{2}	—	November 7, 2008	Catalina	CSS	·	1.7 km	MPC · JPL
509872	2009 BD_{4}	—	November 24, 2008	Mount Lemmon	Mount Lemmon Survey	·	1.8 km	MPC · JPL
509873	2009 BW_{4}	—	January 18, 2009	Kitt Peak	Spacewatch	·	2.2 km	MPC · JPL
509874	2009 BT_{6}	—	January 1, 2009	Kitt Peak	Spacewatch	·	1.8 km	MPC · JPL
509875	2009 BO_{19}	—	January 2, 2009	Mount Lemmon	Mount Lemmon Survey	·	1.6 km	MPC · JPL
509876	2009 BB_{26}	—	December 31, 2008	Mount Lemmon	Mount Lemmon Survey	·	1.5 km	MPC · JPL
509877	2009 BJ_{36}	—	January 1, 2009	Mount Lemmon	Mount Lemmon Survey	·	1.3 km	MPC · JPL
509878	2009 BQ_{42}	—	January 16, 2009	Kitt Peak	Spacewatch	·	1.1 km	MPC · JPL
509879	2009 BV_{44}	—	January 16, 2009	Kitt Peak	Spacewatch	DOR	1.9 km	MPC · JPL
509880	2009 BO_{60}	—	October 26, 2008	Mount Lemmon	Mount Lemmon Survey	EUN	1.2 km	MPC · JPL
509881	2009 BK_{62}	—	October 31, 2008	Mount Lemmon	Mount Lemmon Survey	DOR	2.4 km	MPC · JPL
509882	2009 BN_{64}	—	November 24, 2008	Mount Lemmon	Mount Lemmon Survey	DOR	2.1 km	MPC · JPL
509883	2009 BA_{65}	—	January 20, 2009	Kitt Peak	Spacewatch	·	1.7 km	MPC · JPL
509884	2009 BZ_{67}	—	December 22, 2008	Mount Lemmon	Mount Lemmon Survey	·	2.0 km	MPC · JPL
509885	2009 BY_{73}	—	December 31, 2008	Mount Lemmon	Mount Lemmon Survey	(32418)	1.8 km	MPC · JPL
509886	2009 BC_{85}	—	January 15, 2009	Kitt Peak	Spacewatch	AEO	950 m	MPC · JPL
509887	2009 BQ_{88}	—	January 25, 2009	Kitt Peak	Spacewatch	·	1.3 km	MPC · JPL
509888	2009 BJ_{97}	—	December 30, 2008	Mount Lemmon	Mount Lemmon Survey	·	1.9 km	MPC · JPL
509889	2009 BV_{97}	—	November 30, 2008	Socorro	LINEAR	(1547)	1.3 km	MPC · JPL
509890	2009 BA_{116}	—	January 15, 2009	Kitt Peak	Spacewatch	·	1.4 km	MPC · JPL
509891	2009 BC_{119}	—	December 30, 2008	Kitt Peak	Spacewatch	·	1.5 km	MPC · JPL
509892	2009 BK_{121}	—	January 31, 2009	Kitt Peak	Spacewatch	·	1.4 km	MPC · JPL
509893	2009 BZ_{126}	—	January 29, 2009	Kitt Peak	Spacewatch	·	1.2 km	MPC · JPL
509894	2009 BF_{168}	—	January 24, 2009	Cerro Burek	Burek, Cerro	·	1.8 km	MPC · JPL
509895	2009 BT_{178}	—	January 29, 2009	Catalina	CSS	·	1.8 km	MPC · JPL
509896	2009 CK_{15}	—	December 30, 2008	Mount Lemmon	Mount Lemmon Survey	AGN	1.1 km	MPC · JPL
509897	2009 CS_{25}	—	November 23, 2008	Mount Lemmon	Mount Lemmon Survey	·	1.9 km	MPC · JPL
509898	2009 CF_{28}	—	September 9, 2007	Kitt Peak	Spacewatch	·	1.5 km	MPC · JPL
509899	2009 CQ_{38}	—	February 13, 2009	Kitt Peak	Spacewatch	·	1.6 km	MPC · JPL
509900	2009 CV_{50}	—	February 14, 2009	Catalina	CSS	·	1.8 km	MPC · JPL

== 509901–510000 ==
back to top

Designation			Discovery			Properties		Ref
Permanent	Provisional	Named after	Date	Site	Discoverer(s)	Category	Diam.	Ref
509901	2009 DK	—	March 10, 2005	Mount Lemmon	Mount Lemmon Survey	·	1.4 km	MPC · JPL
509902	2009 DW_{2}	—	November 18, 2008	Kitt Peak	Spacewatch	·	1.5 km	MPC · JPL
509903	2009 DK_{19}	—	February 20, 2009	Kitt Peak	Spacewatch	(13314)	1.6 km	MPC · JPL
509904	2009 DB_{30}	—	February 23, 2009	Calar Alto	F. Hormuth	KOR	1.0 km	MPC · JPL
509905	2009 DJ_{42}	—	February 3, 2009	Kitt Peak	Spacewatch	·	1.5 km	MPC · JPL
509906	2009 DO_{93}	—	February 28, 2009	Mount Lemmon	Mount Lemmon Survey	·	640 m	MPC · JPL
509907	2009 DH_{96}	—	February 28, 2009	Mount Lemmon	Mount Lemmon Survey	·	1.6 km	MPC · JPL
509908	2009 DN_{112}	—	January 25, 2009	Kitt Peak	Spacewatch	DOR	2.0 km	MPC · JPL
509909	2009 EB_{16}	—	March 15, 2009	Kitt Peak	Spacewatch	·	2.4 km	MPC · JPL
509910	2009 FY_{3}	—	March 18, 2009	La Sagra	OAM	·	2.6 km	MPC · JPL
509911	2009 FW_{7}	—	March 16, 2009	Kitt Peak	Spacewatch	·	3.0 km	MPC · JPL
509912	2009 FD_{17}	—	March 16, 2009	Catalina	CSS	·	1.7 km	MPC · JPL
509913	2009 FC_{40}	—	March 19, 2009	Catalina	CSS	MRX	1.2 km	MPC · JPL
509914	2009 FH_{41}	—	March 16, 2009	XuYi	PMO NEO Survey Program	·	2.0 km	MPC · JPL
509915	2009 FR_{48}	—	January 18, 2009	Catalina	CSS	·	2.4 km	MPC · JPL
509916	2009 FM_{75}	—	March 18, 2009	Kitt Peak	Spacewatch	·	1.6 km	MPC · JPL
509917	2009 HA	—	April 16, 2009	Kitami	K. Endate	·	2.5 km	MPC · JPL
509918	2009 HG_{8}	—	April 17, 2009	Kitt Peak	Spacewatch	·	3.5 km	MPC · JPL
509919	2009 HF_{12}	—	April 18, 2009	Piszkéstető	K. Sárneczky	·	3.6 km	MPC · JPL
509920	2009 HU_{37}	—	March 24, 2009	Mount Lemmon	Mount Lemmon Survey	·	1.5 km	MPC · JPL
509921	2009 HK_{42}	—	April 20, 2009	Kitt Peak	Spacewatch	·	460 m	MPC · JPL
509922	2009 HN_{62}	—	May 1, 2006	Kitt Peak	Spacewatch	·	560 m	MPC · JPL
509923	2009 HS_{67}	—	April 27, 2009	Tzec Maun	Tozzi, F.	·	2.4 km	MPC · JPL
509924	2009 HS_{87}	—	December 31, 2007	Mount Lemmon	Mount Lemmon Survey	·	3.2 km	MPC · JPL
509925	2009 HW_{108}	—	April 29, 2009	Mount Lemmon	Mount Lemmon Survey	L5	10 km	MPC · JPL
509926	2009 NY	—	July 15, 2009	La Sagra	OAM	·	4.5 km	MPC · JPL
509927	2009 OE	—	December 6, 2007	Mount Lemmon	Mount Lemmon Survey	H	540 m	MPC · JPL
509928	2009 OX_{2}	—	July 20, 2009	La Sagra	OAM	·	1.3 km	MPC · JPL
509929	2009 OV_{8}	—	July 27, 2009	Catalina	CSS	·	1.3 km	MPC · JPL
509930	2009 OV_{20}	—	July 25, 2009	La Sagra	OAM	·	1.4 km	MPC · JPL
509931	2009 ON_{22}	—	July 27, 2009	Catalina	CSS	·	3.6 km	MPC · JPL
509932	2009 OH_{24}	—	July 29, 2009	Kitt Peak	Spacewatch	·	1.1 km	MPC · JPL
509933	2009 PJ_{8}	—	August 15, 2009	Catalina	CSS	V	950 m	MPC · JPL
509934	2009 PF_{19}	—	August 15, 2009	Kitt Peak	Spacewatch	NYS	740 m	MPC · JPL
509935	2009 QL_{8}	—	August 20, 2009	Catalina	CSS	APO · PHA	460 m	MPC · JPL
509936	2009 QT_{19}	—	August 19, 2009	La Sagra	OAM	NYS	910 m	MPC · JPL
509937	2009 QU_{31}	—	August 16, 2009	La Sagra	OAM	NYS	950 m	MPC · JPL
509938	2009 QN_{46}	—	August 15, 2009	Kitt Peak	Spacewatch	·	1.1 km	MPC · JPL
509939	2009 QB_{51}	—	August 20, 2009	La Sagra	OAM	·	930 m	MPC · JPL
509940	2009 QK_{51}	—	August 15, 2009	Kitt Peak	Spacewatch	EUP	3.7 km	MPC · JPL
509941	2009 QD_{53}	—	August 16, 2009	La Sagra	OAM	·	3.4 km	MPC · JPL
509942	2009 QZ_{54}	—	August 28, 2009	Catalina	CSS	·	1.3 km	MPC · JPL
509943	2009 QH_{55}	—	August 27, 2009	Kitt Peak	Spacewatch	·	760 m	MPC · JPL
509944	2009 RQ_{13}	—	September 12, 2009	Kitt Peak	Spacewatch	MAS	600 m	MPC · JPL
509945	2009 RX_{15}	—	September 12, 2009	Kitt Peak	Spacewatch	MAS	540 m	MPC · JPL
509946	2009 RV_{48}	—	September 15, 2009	Kitt Peak	Spacewatch	CLA	1.2 km	MPC · JPL
509947	2009 RY_{74}	—	September 13, 2009	Socorro	LINEAR	·	920 m	MPC · JPL
509948	2009 SF_{20}	—	July 29, 2009	Catalina	CSS	·	1.7 km	MPC · JPL
509949	2009 SN_{20}	—	August 29, 2009	Kitt Peak	Spacewatch	·	950 m	MPC · JPL
509950	2009 SH_{40}	—	September 16, 2009	Kitt Peak	Spacewatch	MAS	600 m	MPC · JPL
509951	2009 SX_{45}	—	March 27, 2008	Kitt Peak	Spacewatch	JUN	1.4 km	MPC · JPL
509952	2009 SJ_{50}	—	January 27, 2007	Kitt Peak	Spacewatch	·	960 m	MPC · JPL
509953	2009 SA_{51}	—	September 17, 2009	Kitt Peak	Spacewatch	·	920 m	MPC · JPL
509954	2009 SN_{67}	—	September 17, 2009	Kitt Peak	Spacewatch	SYL · CYB	5.0 km	MPC · JPL
509955	2009 SA_{82}	—	August 18, 2009	Kitt Peak	Spacewatch	·	1 km	MPC · JPL
509956	2009 SF_{133}	—	September 18, 2009	Kitt Peak	Spacewatch	NYS	1.0 km	MPC · JPL
509957	2009 SV_{146}	—	September 19, 2009	Kitt Peak	Spacewatch	·	1.0 km	MPC · JPL
509958	2009 SN_{152}	—	August 27, 2009	Catalina	CSS	·	890 m	MPC · JPL
509959	2009 SZ_{152}	—	July 5, 2005	Kitt Peak	Spacewatch	·	920 m	MPC · JPL
509960	2009 SK_{187}	—	September 21, 2009	Kitt Peak	Spacewatch	NYS	1.2 km	MPC · JPL
509961	2009 SD_{202}	—	September 22, 2009	Kitt Peak	Spacewatch	NYS	1.0 km	MPC · JPL
509962	2009 SZ_{202}	—	September 22, 2009	Kitt Peak	Spacewatch	·	870 m	MPC · JPL
509963	2009 SM_{252}	—	September 21, 2009	Kitt Peak	Spacewatch	·	1.1 km	MPC · JPL
509964	2009 SF_{255}	—	August 29, 2009	Catalina	CSS	·	3.2 km	MPC · JPL
509965	2009 SJ_{258}	—	September 21, 2009	Mount Lemmon	Mount Lemmon Survey	MAS	570 m	MPC · JPL
509966	2009 SG_{280}	—	September 25, 2009	Kitt Peak	Spacewatch	·	930 m	MPC · JPL
509967	2009 SD_{289}	—	September 17, 2009	Kitt Peak	Spacewatch	·	910 m	MPC · JPL
509968	2009 SN_{317}	—	September 19, 2009	Kitt Peak	Spacewatch	MAS	580 m	MPC · JPL
509969	2009 SC_{321}	—	September 21, 2009	Catalina	CSS	·	1.3 km	MPC · JPL
509970	2009 SZ_{323}	—	September 20, 2009	Kitt Peak	Spacewatch	·	790 m	MPC · JPL
509971	2009 SS_{333}	—	August 29, 2009	Kitt Peak	Spacewatch	MAS	570 m	MPC · JPL
509972	2009 SO_{341}	—	September 26, 2009	Kitt Peak	Spacewatch	·	620 m	MPC · JPL
509973	2009 SJ_{342}	—	September 16, 2009	Kitt Peak	Spacewatch	MAS	600 m	MPC · JPL
509974	2009 SG_{358}	—	September 16, 2009	Kitt Peak	Spacewatch	NYS	890 m	MPC · JPL
509975	2009 TW_{9}	—	October 15, 2009	Mayhill	Lowe, A.	·	1.3 km	MPC · JPL
509976	2009 TA_{11}	—	September 27, 2009	Mount Lemmon	Mount Lemmon Survey	H	540 m	MPC · JPL
509977	2009 TF_{11}	—	September 20, 2009	Mount Lemmon	Mount Lemmon Survey	V	680 m	MPC · JPL
509978	2009 TX_{14}	—	September 16, 2009	Catalina	CSS	·	1.3 km	MPC · JPL
509979	2009 TC_{18}	—	October 15, 2009	La Sagra	OAM	·	1.1 km	MPC · JPL
509980	2009 TL_{19}	—	October 11, 2009	Mount Lemmon	Mount Lemmon Survey	·	910 m	MPC · JPL
509981	2009 TH_{23}	—	October 14, 2009	La Sagra	OAM	·	1.3 km	MPC · JPL
509982	2009 TN_{25}	—	October 14, 2009	Mount Lemmon	Mount Lemmon Survey	NYS	1.3 km	MPC · JPL
509983	2009 UP_{18}	—	October 23, 2009	Catalina	CSS	H	560 m	MPC · JPL
509984	2009 UT_{49}	—	October 22, 2009	Mount Lemmon	Mount Lemmon Survey	·	950 m	MPC · JPL
509985	2009 UE_{51}	—	October 22, 2009	Catalina	CSS	·	430 m	MPC · JPL
509986	2009 US_{61}	—	October 17, 2009	Mount Lemmon	Mount Lemmon Survey	H	450 m	MPC · JPL
509987	2009 UM_{95}	—	October 22, 2009	Mount Lemmon	Mount Lemmon Survey	·	940 m	MPC · JPL
509988	2009 UF_{99}	—	October 1, 2005	Mount Lemmon	Mount Lemmon Survey	MAS	640 m	MPC · JPL
509989	2009 UV_{110}	—	October 23, 2009	Kitt Peak	Spacewatch	·	890 m	MPC · JPL
509990	2009 US_{113}	—	September 20, 2009	Kitt Peak	Spacewatch	·	860 m	MPC · JPL
509991	2009 UT_{128}	—	October 26, 2009	Bisei SG Center	BATTeRS	·	1.1 km	MPC · JPL
509992	2009 UT_{143}	—	October 18, 2009	Mount Lemmon	Mount Lemmon Survey	(5)	1.1 km	MPC · JPL
509993	2009 UZ_{154}	—	October 22, 2009	Mount Lemmon	Mount Lemmon Survey	·	930 m	MPC · JPL
509994	2009 VV_{1}	—	November 9, 2009	Socorro	LINEAR	H	590 m	MPC · JPL
509995	2009 VP_{30}	—	October 5, 2005	Catalina	CSS	·	1.5 km	MPC · JPL
509996	2009 VB_{37}	—	September 6, 2005	Anderson Mesa	LONEOS	NYS	1.1 km	MPC · JPL
509997	2009 VS_{41}	—	November 9, 2009	Mount Lemmon	Mount Lemmon Survey	NYS	1.0 km	MPC · JPL
509998	2009 VA_{44}	—	October 14, 2009	Mount Lemmon	Mount Lemmon Survey	·	1.8 km	MPC · JPL
509999	2009 VU_{47}	—	November 9, 2009	Mount Lemmon	Mount Lemmon Survey	·	970 m	MPC · JPL
510000	2009 VM_{49}	—	September 11, 2005	Kitt Peak	Spacewatch	·	750 m	MPC · JPL

back to top

== Meaning of names ==
As minor planet discoveries are confirmed, they are given a permanent number by the IAU's Minor Planet Center (MPC), and the discoverers can then submit names for them, following the IAU's naming conventions. The list below concerns those minor planets in the specified number-range that have received names, and explains the meanings of those names.

Official naming citations of newly named small Solar System bodies are approved and published in a bulletin by IAU's Working Group for Small Bodies Nomenclature (WGSBN). Before May 2021, citations were published in MPC's Minor Planet Circulars for many decades. Recent citations can also be found on the JPL Small-Body Database (SBDB). Until his death in 2016, German astronomer Lutz D. Schmadel compiled these citations into the Dictionary of Minor Planet Names (DMP) and regularly updated the collection.

Based on Paul Herget's The Names of the Minor Planets, Schmadel also researched the unclear origin of numerous asteroids, most of which had been named prior to World War II. This article incorporates text from this source, which is in the public domain: SBDB New namings may only be added to this list below after official publication as the preannouncement of names is condemned. The WGSBN publishes a comprehensive guideline for the naming rules of non-cometary small Solar System bodies.

Named minor planet	Provisional	This minor planet was named for...	Ref · Catalog
509018 Wiese	2005 NE_{1}	Tony Wiese (born 1956) has led the Fort Bend Astronomy Club's astronomical outreach efforts for over a decade. Over that time FBAC provided nearly 10% of the total volunteer hours reported to the Astronomical League, an organization that includes over 300 astronomy clubs across the United States.	JPL · 509018
509761 Umberto	2008 UM	Umberto Martissa (b. 1935) is teaching in an Italian mathematics high-school. For many years he has been President of the Circolo Culturale Astronomico di Farra d'Isonzo.	IAU · 509761
