= List of mayors of Fribourg =

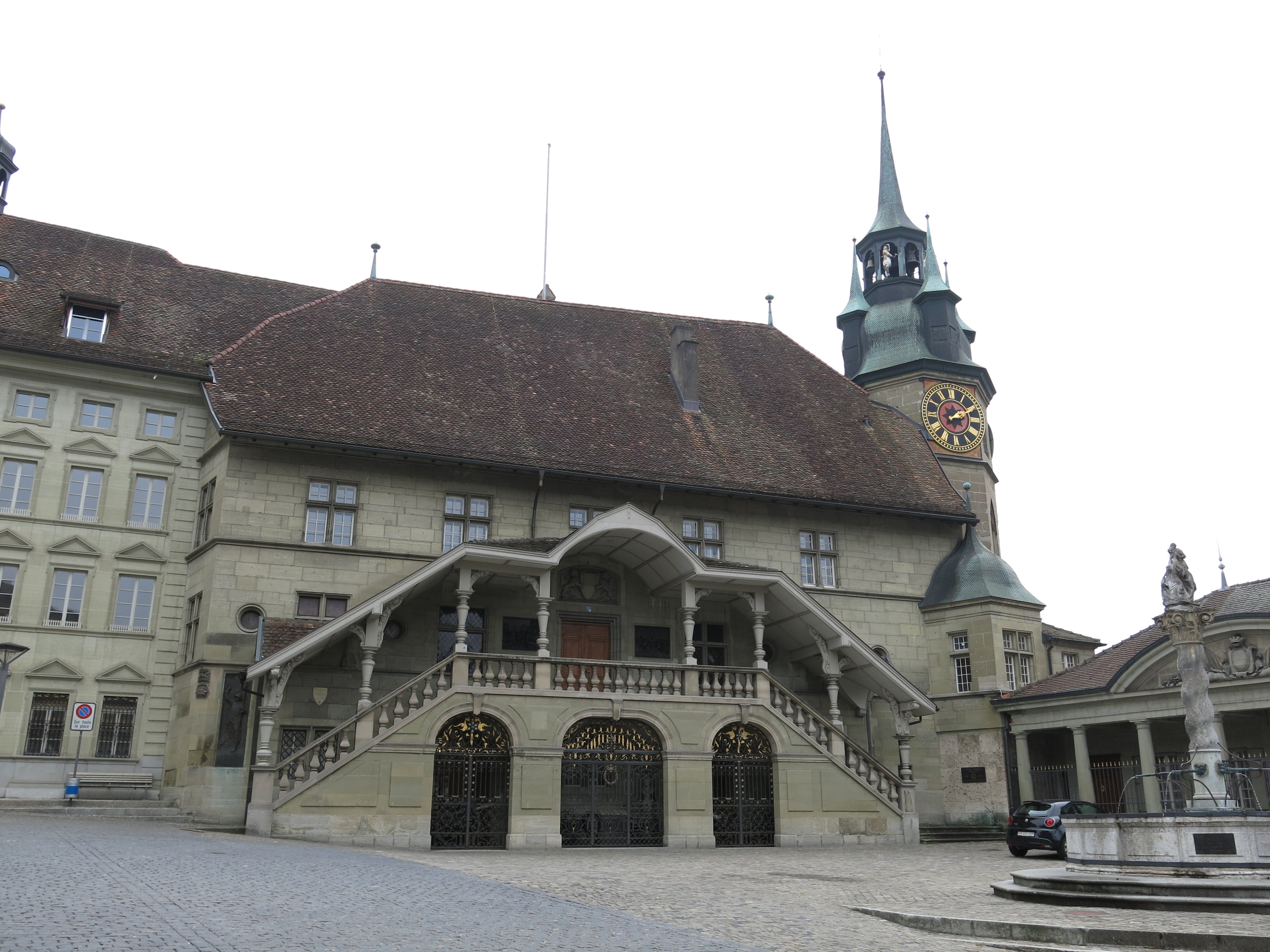
Hôtel-de-Ville, Fribourg

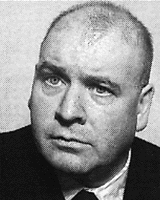
Jean Bourgknecht mayor (1950–1959) member of the Swiss Federal Council (1959–1962)

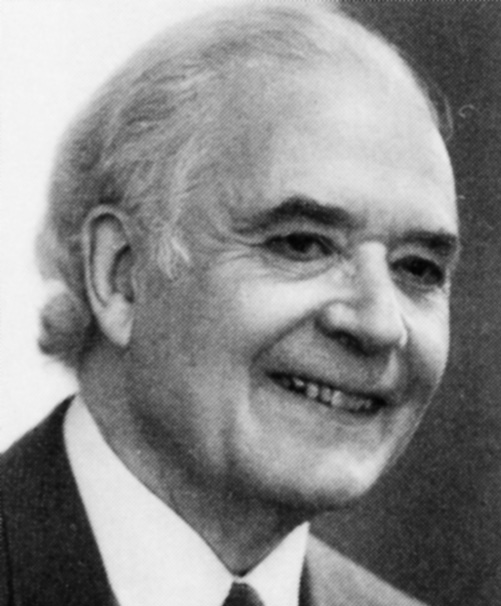
Max Aebischer, mayor (1960–1966)

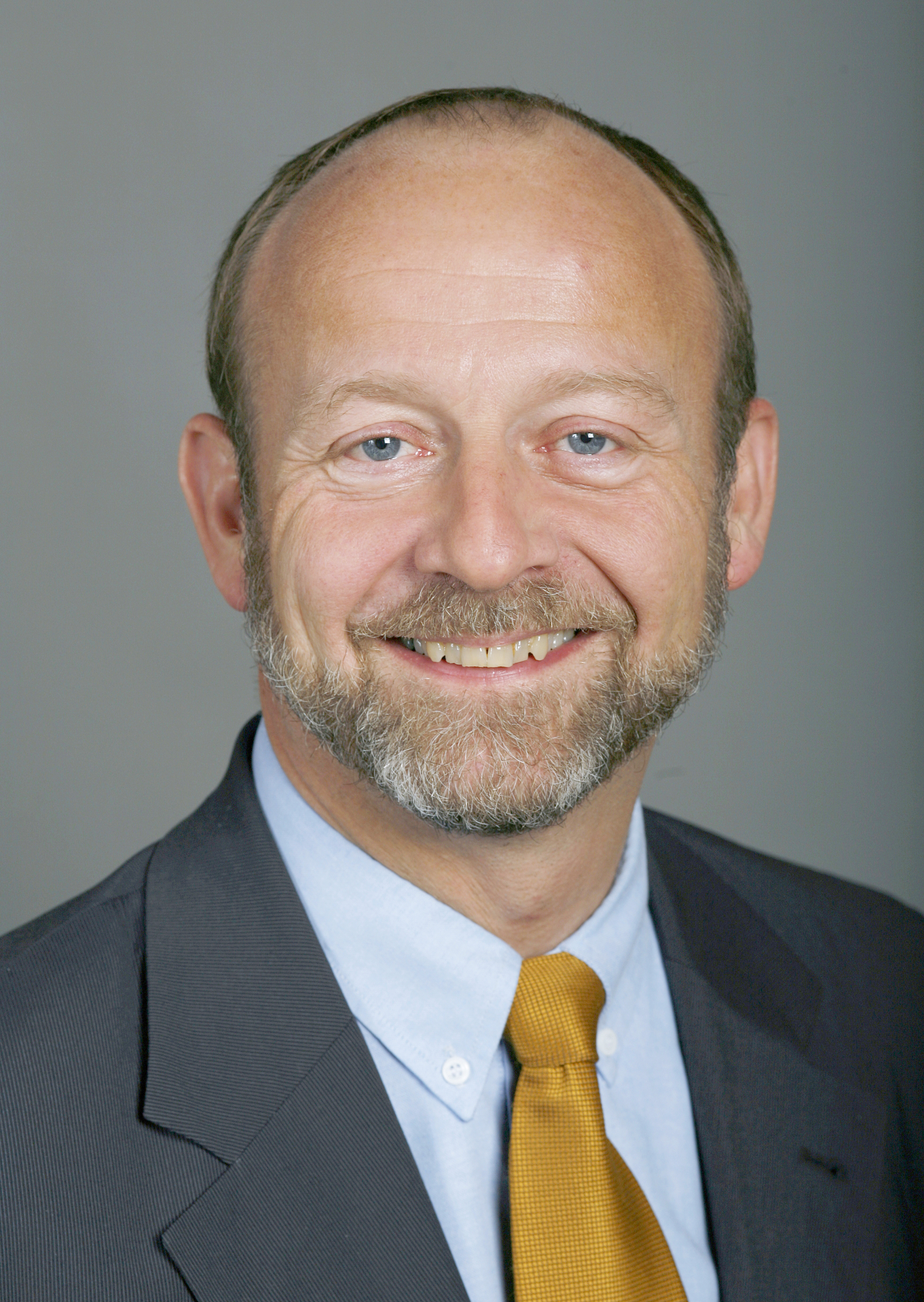
Dominique de Buman, mayor (1994–2004)

Coat of arms of Fribourg

This is a list of mayors of Fribourg, Switzerland. The mayor of Fribourg (French: syndic de Fribourg, German: Stadtammann or Ammann von Freiburg) presides the city's executive.

Mayor of Fribourg
Term	Mayor	Lifespan	Party	Notes
1798–1803	Jean de Montenach	(1766–1842)		
1803–1809	Jean-Pierre Philippe de Raemy			
1809–1821	François-Pierre Savary	(1750–1821)		
1821–1842	Albert Fégely			
1842–1847	Philippe d'Odet			
1848	Pierre-Joseph Farvagnié			
1848–1849	Jean-Théobald Hartmann			
1849–1857	Jean-Auguste Cuony			
1857–1858	Gaspard Lalive d'Epinay	(1817–1874)		
1858–1886	Louis de Chollet	(1825–1902)		
1886–1895	Paul Aeby	(1841–1898)		father of Pierre Aeby
1895–1903	Louis Bourgknecht	(1846–1923)		grandfather of Jean Bourgknecht (1902–1964)
1903–1919	Ernest de Weck	(1860–1919)		cousin of Romain de Weck
1919–1922	Romain de Weck	(1856–1934)		
1922–1938	Pierre Aeby	(1884–1957)	CVP/PDC	
1938–1950	Ernest Lorson	(1895–1959)	CVP/PDC	
1950–1959	Jean Bourgknecht	(1902–1964)	CVP/PDC	grandfather of Jean Bourgknecht (born 1962)
1960–1966	Max Aebischer	(1914–2009)	CVP/PDC	
1966–1982	Lucien Nussbaumer	(1919–1988)	FDP/PLR	
1982–1993	Claude Schorderet	(born 1935)	CVP/PDC	
1994–2004	Dominique de Buman	(born 1956)	CVP/PDC	
2004–2006	Jean Bourgknecht	(born 1962)	CVP/PDC	
2006–2016	Pierre-Alain Clément	(born 1951)	SPS/PSS	
2016–present	Thierry Steiert	(born 1963)	SPS/PSS	
