= List of minor planets: 207001–208000 =

The following is a partial list of minor planets, running from minor-planet number 207001 through 208000, inclusive. The primary data for this and other partial lists is based on JPL's "Small-Body Orbital Elements" and data available from the Minor Planet Center. Critical list information is also provided by the MPC, unless otherwise specified from Lowell Observatory. A detailed description of the table's columns and additional sources are given on the main page including a complete list of every page in this series, and a statistical break-up on the dynamical classification of minor planets.

Also see the summary list of all named bodies in numerical and alphabetical order, and the corresponding naming citations for the number range of this particular list. New namings may only be added to this list after official publication, as the preannouncement of names is condemned by the Working Group for Small Bodies Nomenclature of the International Astronomical Union.

Near-Earth obj.	MBA (inner)	MBA (outer)	Centaur
Mars-crosser	MBA (middle)	Jupiter trojan	Trans-Neptunian obj.
Unclassified

== 207001–207100 ==
Designation			Discovery			Properties		Ref
Permanent	Provisional	Named after	Date	Site	Discoverer(s)	Category	Diam.	Ref
207001	2004 TY_{222}	—	October 7, 2004	Palomar	NEAT	·	1.0 km	MPC · JPL
207002	2004 TM_{234}	—	October 8, 2004	Kitt Peak	Spacewatch	MAS	930 m	MPC · JPL
207003	2004 TO_{269}	—	October 9, 2004	Kitt Peak	Spacewatch	·	1.3 km	MPC · JPL
207004	2004 TS_{269}	—	October 9, 2004	Kitt Peak	Spacewatch	·	1.1 km	MPC · JPL
207005	2004 TG_{273}	—	October 9, 2004	Kitt Peak	Spacewatch	·	1.4 km	MPC · JPL
207006	2004 TC_{274}	—	October 9, 2004	Kitt Peak	Spacewatch	NYS	1.5 km	MPC · JPL
207007	2004 TE_{277}	—	October 9, 2004	Kitt Peak	Spacewatch	NYS	1.1 km	MPC · JPL
207008	2004 TY_{282}	—	October 7, 2004	Palomar	NEAT	·	1.0 km	MPC · JPL
207009	2004 TT_{286}	—	October 9, 2004	Socorro	LINEAR	·	1.8 km	MPC · JPL
207010	2004 TQ_{319}	—	October 11, 2004	Kitt Peak	Spacewatch	·	1.2 km	MPC · JPL
207011	2004 TY_{320}	—	October 11, 2004	Kitt Peak	Spacewatch	·	900 m	MPC · JPL
207012	2004 TB_{325}	—	October 12, 2004	Kitt Peak	Spacewatch	·	940 m	MPC · JPL
207013 Fischetti	2004 TC_{354}	Fischetti	October 11, 2004	Kitt Peak	M. W. Buie	·	1.2 km	MPC · JPL
207014	2004 UQ_{8}	—	October 21, 2004	Socorro	LINEAR	V	890 m	MPC · JPL
207015	2004 VE_{2}	—	November 2, 2004	Anderson Mesa	LONEOS	·	1.7 km	MPC · JPL
207016	2004 VZ_{5}	—	November 3, 2004	Kitt Peak	Spacewatch	MAS	940 m	MPC · JPL
207017	2004 VB_{6}	—	November 3, 2004	Kitt Peak	Spacewatch	·	1.6 km	MPC · JPL
207018	2004 VH_{8}	—	November 3, 2004	Anderson Mesa	LONEOS	·	1.7 km	MPC · JPL
207019	2004 VY_{12}	—	November 3, 2004	Palomar	NEAT	·	1.6 km	MPC · JPL
207020	2004 VX_{14}	—	November 4, 2004	Anderson Mesa	LONEOS	·	2.0 km	MPC · JPL
207021	2004 VQ_{23}	—	November 5, 2004	Palomar	NEAT	·	3.3 km	MPC · JPL
207022	2004 VQ_{28}	—	November 7, 2004	Socorro	LINEAR	·	2.8 km	MPC · JPL
207023	2004 VS_{46}	—	November 4, 2004	Kitt Peak	Spacewatch	·	1.7 km	MPC · JPL
207024	2004 VX_{47}	—	November 4, 2004	Kitt Peak	Spacewatch	NYS	1.3 km	MPC · JPL
207025	2004 VT_{57}	—	November 7, 2004	Socorro	LINEAR	·	1.1 km	MPC · JPL
207026	2004 VV_{57}	—	November 7, 2004	Socorro	LINEAR	·	1.4 km	MPC · JPL
207027	2004 VD_{59}	—	November 9, 2004	Catalina	CSS	·	980 m	MPC · JPL
207028	2004 VN_{60}	—	November 10, 2004	Wrightwood	J. W. Young	V	930 m	MPC · JPL
207029	2004 VV_{63}	—	November 10, 2004	Kitt Peak	Spacewatch	NYS	1.3 km	MPC · JPL
207030	2004 VH_{77}	—	November 12, 2004	Catalina	CSS	·	1.3 km	MPC · JPL
207031	2004 VG_{81}	—	November 4, 2004	Kitt Peak	Spacewatch	·	2.2 km	MPC · JPL
207032	2004 VN_{86}	—	November 10, 2004	Kitt Peak	Spacewatch	·	1.1 km	MPC · JPL
207033	2004 WW_{1}	—	November 17, 2004	Campo Imperatore	CINEOS	·	1.6 km	MPC · JPL
207034	2004 WM_{2}	—	November 17, 2004	Campo Imperatore	CINEOS	NYS	1.4 km	MPC · JPL
207035	2004 WR_{5}	—	November 19, 2004	Kitt Peak	Spacewatch	·	890 m	MPC · JPL
207036	2004 XU_{2}	—	December 2, 2004	Catalina	CSS	(883)	1.3 km	MPC · JPL
207037	2004 XA_{6}	—	December 9, 2004	Catalina	CSS	·	1.7 km	MPC · JPL
207038	2004 XN_{8}	—	December 2, 2004	Palomar	NEAT	·	1.6 km	MPC · JPL
207039	2004 XW_{8}	—	December 2, 2004	Socorro	LINEAR	HNS	3.0 km	MPC · JPL
207040	2004 XV_{10}	—	December 3, 2004	Kitt Peak	Spacewatch	·	1.8 km	MPC · JPL
207041	2004 XX_{17}	—	December 7, 2004	Socorro	LINEAR	PHO	1.3 km	MPC · JPL
207042	2004 XH_{24}	—	December 9, 2004	Catalina	CSS	·	1.6 km	MPC · JPL
207043	2004 XP_{24}	—	December 9, 2004	Catalina	CSS	·	970 m	MPC · JPL
207044	2004 XT_{27}	—	December 10, 2004	Socorro	LINEAR	·	1.6 km	MPC · JPL
207045	2004 XA_{31}	—	December 8, 2004	Socorro	LINEAR	MAS	880 m	MPC · JPL
207046	2004 XM_{31}	—	December 9, 2004	Catalina	CSS	·	2.1 km	MPC · JPL
207047	2004 XP_{36}	—	December 10, 2004	Vail-Jarnac	Jarnac	NYS	1.8 km	MPC · JPL
207048	2004 XF_{40}	—	December 10, 2004	Socorro	LINEAR	MAS	860 m	MPC · JPL
207049	2004 XJ_{44}	—	December 13, 2004	Campo Imperatore	CINEOS	·	2.8 km	MPC · JPL
207050	2004 XV_{50}	—	December 14, 2004	Campo Imperatore	CINEOS	·	2.2 km	MPC · JPL
207051	2004 XY_{50}	—	December 14, 2004	Campo Imperatore	CINEOS	·	2.2 km	MPC · JPL
207052	2004 XK_{53}	—	December 10, 2004	Kitt Peak	Spacewatch	·	1.7 km	MPC · JPL
207053	2004 XR_{58}	—	December 10, 2004	Kitt Peak	Spacewatch	·	2.4 km	MPC · JPL
207054	2004 XF_{63}	—	December 12, 2004	Anderson Mesa	LONEOS	·	2.8 km	MPC · JPL
207055	2004 XL_{64}	—	December 2, 2004	Kitt Peak	Spacewatch	V	1.1 km	MPC · JPL
207056	2004 XC_{68}	—	December 3, 2004	Kitt Peak	Spacewatch	·	1.8 km	MPC · JPL
207057	2004 XF_{74}	—	December 8, 2004	Socorro	LINEAR	·	2.1 km	MPC · JPL
207058	2004 XP_{74}	—	December 8, 2004	Socorro	LINEAR	·	2.2 km	MPC · JPL
207059	2004 XU_{77}	—	December 10, 2004	Socorro	LINEAR	MAS	1.2 km	MPC · JPL
207060	2004 XX_{83}	—	December 11, 2004	Kitt Peak	Spacewatch	·	1.9 km	MPC · JPL
207061	2004 XA_{84}	—	December 11, 2004	Kitt Peak	Spacewatch	·	2.0 km	MPC · JPL
207062	2004 XD_{86}	—	December 13, 2004	Kitt Peak	Spacewatch	·	1.2 km	MPC · JPL
207063	2004 XD_{98}	—	December 11, 2004	Kitt Peak	Spacewatch	·	1.6 km	MPC · JPL
207064	2004 XS_{99}	—	December 12, 2004	Kitt Peak	Spacewatch	MAS	1.0 km	MPC · JPL
207065	2004 XX_{103}	—	December 9, 2004	Catalina	CSS	·	2.9 km	MPC · JPL
207066	2004 XV_{104}	—	December 10, 2004	Kitt Peak	Spacewatch	·	1.8 km	MPC · JPL
207067	2004 XW_{109}	—	December 13, 2004	Anderson Mesa	LONEOS	·	2.2 km	MPC · JPL
207068	2004 XG_{110}	—	December 14, 2004	Socorro	LINEAR	·	1.8 km	MPC · JPL
207069	2004 XH_{112}	—	December 10, 2004	Kitt Peak	Spacewatch	·	1.8 km	MPC · JPL
207070	2004 XE_{114}	—	December 10, 2004	Kitt Peak	Spacewatch	·	1.3 km	MPC · JPL
207071	2004 XY_{118}	—	December 12, 2004	Kitt Peak	Spacewatch	MAS	1.3 km	MPC · JPL
207072	2004 XX_{120}	—	December 14, 2004	Socorro	LINEAR	·	3.0 km	MPC · JPL
207073	2004 XR_{126}	—	December 13, 2004	Socorro	LINEAR	PHO	1.6 km	MPC · JPL
207074	2004 XJ_{128}	—	December 14, 2004	Socorro	LINEAR	·	1.5 km	MPC · JPL
207075	2004 XV_{131}	—	December 11, 2004	Kitt Peak	Spacewatch	NEM	3.1 km	MPC · JPL
207076	2004 XS_{132}	—	December 14, 2004	Socorro	LINEAR	·	2.0 km	MPC · JPL
207077	2004 XP_{140}	—	December 13, 2004	Kitt Peak	Spacewatch	NYS	1.6 km	MPC · JPL
207078	2004 XH_{141}	—	December 14, 2004	Socorro	LINEAR	MAS	1.2 km	MPC · JPL
207079	2004 XQ_{143}	—	December 9, 2004	Kitt Peak	Spacewatch	·	1.2 km	MPC · JPL
207080	2004 XR_{147}	—	December 13, 2004	Kitt Peak	Spacewatch	ADE	4.3 km	MPC · JPL
207081	2004 XZ_{147}	—	December 14, 2004	Catalina	CSS	·	1.4 km	MPC · JPL
207082	2004 XZ_{160}	—	December 14, 2004	Kitt Peak	Spacewatch	·	1.7 km	MPC · JPL
207083	2004 XA_{164}	—	December 3, 2004	Anderson Mesa	LONEOS	V	950 m	MPC · JPL
207084	2004 XY_{165}	—	December 2, 2004	Catalina	CSS	·	1.4 km	MPC · JPL
207085	2004 XW_{166}	—	December 2, 2004	Kitt Peak	Spacewatch	·	1.5 km	MPC · JPL
207086	2004 XQ_{171}	—	December 10, 2004	Kitt Peak	Spacewatch	·	1.6 km	MPC · JPL
207087	2004 YX_{11}	—	December 18, 2004	Mount Lemmon	Mount Lemmon Survey	NYS	1.5 km	MPC · JPL
207088	2004 YV_{13}	—	December 18, 2004	Mount Lemmon	Mount Lemmon Survey	NYS	1.9 km	MPC · JPL
207089	2004 YS_{17}	—	December 18, 2004	Mount Lemmon	Mount Lemmon Survey	NYS	1.7 km	MPC · JPL
207090	2004 YW_{20}	—	December 18, 2004	Mount Lemmon	Mount Lemmon Survey	·	1.0 km	MPC · JPL
207091	2005 AQ_{1}	—	January 1, 2005	Catalina	CSS	·	2.0 km	MPC · JPL
207092	2005 AH_{4}	—	January 6, 2005	Catalina	CSS	·	1.6 km	MPC · JPL
207093	2005 AU_{4}	—	January 6, 2005	Catalina	CSS	·	1.6 km	MPC · JPL
207094	2005 AH_{5}	—	January 6, 2005	Catalina	CSS	·	3.5 km	MPC · JPL
207095	2005 AR_{6}	—	January 6, 2005	Catalina	CSS	·	1.4 km	MPC · JPL
207096	2005 AT_{6}	—	January 6, 2005	Catalina	CSS	·	1.9 km	MPC · JPL
207097	2005 AG_{7}	—	January 6, 2005	Catalina	CSS	·	2.0 km	MPC · JPL
207098	2005 AY_{7}	—	January 6, 2005	Catalina	CSS	V	1.2 km	MPC · JPL
207099	2005 AS_{10}	—	January 6, 2005	Catalina	CSS	·	2.5 km	MPC · JPL
207100	2005 AK_{11}	—	January 1, 2005	Catalina	CSS	·	3.6 km	MPC · JPL

== 207101–207200 ==
back to top

Designation			Discovery			Properties		Ref
Permanent	Provisional	Named after	Date	Site	Discoverer(s)	Category	Diam.	Ref
207101	2005 AP_{14}	—	January 1, 2005	Catalina	CSS	·	1.9 km	MPC · JPL
207102	2005 AS_{20}	—	January 6, 2005	Socorro	LINEAR	V	950 m	MPC · JPL
207103	2005 AZ_{22}	—	January 7, 2005	Socorro	LINEAR	NYS	1.5 km	MPC · JPL
207104	2005 AP_{23}	—	January 7, 2005	Socorro	LINEAR	EUN	2.2 km	MPC · JPL
207105	2005 AG_{24}	—	January 7, 2005	Catalina	CSS	·	3.0 km	MPC · JPL
207106	2005 AS_{24}	—	January 7, 2005	Catalina	CSS	(5)	1.9 km	MPC · JPL
207107	2005 AT_{24}	—	January 7, 2005	Catalina	CSS	KON	4.5 km	MPC · JPL
207108	2005 AZ_{26}	—	January 13, 2005	Kitt Peak	Spacewatch	·	1.5 km	MPC · JPL
207109 Stürmenchopf	2005 AA_{27}	Stürmenchopf	January 11, 2005	Vicques	M. Ory	·	2.0 km	MPC · JPL
207110	2005 AX_{29}	—	January 8, 2005	Campo Imperatore	CINEOS	MAS	1.2 km	MPC · JPL
207111	2005 AS_{30}	—	January 9, 2005	Junk Bond	Junk Bond	NYS	1.7 km	MPC · JPL
207112	2005 AM_{34}	—	January 13, 2005	Kitt Peak	Spacewatch	·	1.4 km	MPC · JPL
207113	2005 AS_{34}	—	January 13, 2005	Kitt Peak	Spacewatch	·	1.7 km	MPC · JPL
207114	2005 AZ_{34}	—	January 13, 2005	Socorro	LINEAR	·	1.7 km	MPC · JPL
207115	2005 AH_{37}	—	January 13, 2005	Socorro	LINEAR	·	3.4 km	MPC · JPL
207116	2005 AD_{43}	—	January 15, 2005	Socorro	LINEAR	MAS	1.1 km	MPC · JPL
207117	2005 AP_{43}	—	January 15, 2005	Socorro	LINEAR	NYS	1.5 km	MPC · JPL
207118	2005 AQ_{48}	—	January 13, 2005	Kitt Peak	Spacewatch	·	1.7 km	MPC · JPL
207119	2005 AJ_{50}	—	January 13, 2005	Catalina	CSS	·	1.9 km	MPC · JPL
207120	2005 AD_{55}	—	January 15, 2005	Socorro	LINEAR	NYS	2.0 km	MPC · JPL
207121	2005 AT_{58}	—	January 15, 2005	Socorro	LINEAR	·	1.5 km	MPC · JPL
207122	2005 AA_{59}	—	January 15, 2005	Socorro	LINEAR	NYS	1.7 km	MPC · JPL
207123	2005 AY_{61}	—	January 15, 2005	Kitt Peak	Spacewatch	·	3.6 km	MPC · JPL
207124	2005 AB_{62}	—	January 15, 2005	Kitt Peak	Spacewatch	MAR	1.9 km	MPC · JPL
207125	2005 AX_{68}	—	January 13, 2005	Kitt Peak	Spacewatch	·	2.0 km	MPC · JPL
207126	2005 AD_{69}	—	January 15, 2005	Catalina	CSS	615	2.0 km	MPC · JPL
207127	2005 AK_{69}	—	January 15, 2005	Socorro	LINEAR	MAS	1.1 km	MPC · JPL
207128	2005 AJ_{73}	—	January 15, 2005	Kitt Peak	Spacewatch	MAS	1.1 km	MPC · JPL
207129	2005 AV_{74}	—	January 15, 2005	Kitt Peak	Spacewatch	·	1.8 km	MPC · JPL
207130	2005 BW	—	January 16, 2005	Bareggio	Bareggio	·	1.7 km	MPC · JPL
207131	2005 BM_{4}	—	January 16, 2005	Socorro	LINEAR	·	2.7 km	MPC · JPL
207132	2005 BU_{5}	—	January 16, 2005	Socorro	LINEAR	·	2.3 km	MPC · JPL
207133	2005 BE_{6}	—	January 16, 2005	Socorro	LINEAR	·	2.0 km	MPC · JPL
207134	2005 BO_{7}	—	January 16, 2005	Socorro	LINEAR	SUL	3.0 km	MPC · JPL
207135	2005 BX_{7}	—	January 16, 2005	Socorro	LINEAR	·	2.0 km	MPC · JPL
207136	2005 BN_{11}	—	January 16, 2005	Kitt Peak	Spacewatch	·	2.8 km	MPC · JPL
207137	2005 BC_{16}	—	January 16, 2005	Socorro	LINEAR	·	2.0 km	MPC · JPL
207138	2005 BO_{17}	—	January 16, 2005	Kitt Peak	Spacewatch	·	1.7 km	MPC · JPL
207139	2005 BL_{20}	—	January 16, 2005	Socorro	LINEAR	MAR	1.6 km	MPC · JPL
207140	2005 BY_{24}	—	January 17, 2005	Socorro	LINEAR	MAS	1 km	MPC · JPL
207141	2005 BL_{27}	—	January 17, 2005	Goodricke-Pigott	Goodricke-Pigott	·	2.0 km	MPC · JPL
207142	2005 BM_{29}	—	January 18, 2005	Kitt Peak	Spacewatch	·	2.1 km	MPC · JPL
207143	2005 CH_{5}	—	February 1, 2005	Kitt Peak	Spacewatch	·	2.4 km	MPC · JPL
207144	2005 CT_{12}	—	February 2, 2005	Kitt Peak	Spacewatch	V	930 m	MPC · JPL
207145	2005 CT_{13}	—	February 2, 2005	Kitt Peak	Spacewatch	KON	3.0 km	MPC · JPL
207146	2005 CB_{15}	—	February 2, 2005	Kitt Peak	Spacewatch	·	1.3 km	MPC · JPL
207147	2005 CV_{16}	—	February 2, 2005	Socorro	LINEAR	MAR	1.4 km	MPC · JPL
207148	2005 CH_{17}	—	February 2, 2005	Socorro	LINEAR	·	1.3 km	MPC · JPL
207149	2005 CA_{18}	—	February 2, 2005	Catalina	CSS	·	1.2 km	MPC · JPL
207150	2005 CV_{19}	—	February 2, 2005	Catalina	CSS	·	1.4 km	MPC · JPL
207151	2005 CB_{21}	—	February 2, 2005	Catalina	CSS	·	1.8 km	MPC · JPL
207152	2005 CT_{21}	—	February 2, 2005	Palomar	NEAT	·	2.0 km	MPC · JPL
207153	2005 CF_{25}	—	February 4, 2005	Palomar	NEAT	·	2.0 km	MPC · JPL
207154	2005 CQ_{25}	—	February 2, 2005	Catalina	CSS	MAS	1.1 km	MPC · JPL
207155	2005 CN_{26}	—	February 1, 2005	Kitt Peak	Spacewatch	·	2.4 km	MPC · JPL
207156	2005 CD_{27}	—	February 1, 2005	Kitt Peak	Spacewatch	·	1.7 km	MPC · JPL
207157	2005 CL_{28}	—	February 1, 2005	Kitt Peak	Spacewatch	·	1.5 km	MPC · JPL
207158	2005 CF_{34}	—	February 2, 2005	Kitt Peak	Spacewatch	NYS	1.7 km	MPC · JPL
207159	2005 CT_{36}	—	February 3, 2005	Socorro	LINEAR	·	2.3 km	MPC · JPL
207160	2005 CQ_{38}	—	February 3, 2005	Socorro	LINEAR	·	3.2 km	MPC · JPL
207161	2005 CT_{43}	—	February 2, 2005	Catalina	CSS	·	2.0 km	MPC · JPL
207162	2005 CH_{47}	—	February 2, 2005	Kitt Peak	Spacewatch	(5)	1.2 km	MPC · JPL
207163	2005 CW_{47}	—	February 2, 2005	Kitt Peak	Spacewatch	·	1.9 km	MPC · JPL
207164	2005 CY_{47}	—	February 2, 2005	Kitt Peak	Spacewatch	·	1.7 km	MPC · JPL
207165	2005 CZ_{47}	—	February 2, 2005	Kitt Peak	Spacewatch	·	1.5 km	MPC · JPL
207166	2005 CV_{50}	—	February 2, 2005	Socorro	LINEAR	·	2.8 km	MPC · JPL
207167	2005 CR_{52}	—	February 3, 2005	Socorro	LINEAR	·	3.7 km	MPC · JPL
207168	2005 CQ_{53}	—	February 3, 2005	Socorro	LINEAR	·	2.6 km	MPC · JPL
207169	2005 CO_{56}	—	February 9, 2005	Mount Lemmon	Mount Lemmon Survey	·	1.7 km	MPC · JPL
207170	2005 CO_{58}	—	February 2, 2005	Catalina	CSS	·	2.9 km	MPC · JPL
207171	2005 CS_{59}	—	February 2, 2005	Socorro	LINEAR	·	2.3 km	MPC · JPL
207172	2005 CX_{62}	—	February 9, 2005	Kitt Peak	Spacewatch	·	1.9 km	MPC · JPL
207173	2005 CJ_{66}	—	February 9, 2005	Kitt Peak	Spacewatch	·	1.4 km	MPC · JPL
207174	2005 CK_{67}	—	February 15, 2005	Gnosca	S. Sposetti	·	2.2 km	MPC · JPL
207175	2005 CL_{67}	—	February 15, 2005	Gnosca	S. Sposetti	·	1.6 km	MPC · JPL
207176	2005 CU_{67}	—	February 2, 2005	Kitt Peak	Spacewatch	·	1.7 km	MPC · JPL
207177	2005 CU_{68}	—	February 3, 2005	Socorro	LINEAR	·	3.3 km	MPC · JPL
207178	2005 CL_{76}	—	February 3, 2005	Socorro	LINEAR	·	1.9 km	MPC · JPL
207179	2005 CP_{78}	—	February 14, 2005	Socorro	LINEAR	·	2.3 km	MPC · JPL
207180	2005 EU	—	March 2, 2005	Mayhill	Lowe, A.	fast	2.6 km	MPC · JPL
207181	2005 EJ_{6}	—	March 1, 2005	Kitt Peak	Spacewatch	·	1.9 km	MPC · JPL
207182	2005 EB_{10}	—	March 2, 2005	Kitt Peak	Spacewatch	·	1.7 km	MPC · JPL
207183	2005 EU_{12}	—	March 2, 2005	Catalina	CSS	·	2.0 km	MPC · JPL
207184	2005 EZ_{14}	—	March 3, 2005	Kitt Peak	Spacewatch	·	2.8 km	MPC · JPL
207185	2005 EH_{16}	—	March 3, 2005	Kitt Peak	Spacewatch	·	1.4 km	MPC · JPL
207186	2005 EQ_{18}	—	March 3, 2005	Kitt Peak	Spacewatch	·	1.5 km	MPC · JPL
207187	2005 EE_{21}	—	March 3, 2005	Catalina	CSS	·	2.7 km	MPC · JPL
207188	2005 EK_{26}	—	March 3, 2005	Catalina	CSS	·	3.1 km	MPC · JPL
207189	2005 EP_{29}	—	March 3, 2005	Catalina	CSS	·	2.7 km	MPC · JPL
207190	2005 EY_{33}	—	March 1, 2005	Kitt Peak	Spacewatch	·	2.0 km	MPC · JPL
207191	2005 EF_{35}	—	March 3, 2005	Kitt Peak	Spacewatch	PHO	1.6 km	MPC · JPL
207192	2005 EB_{38}	—	March 4, 2005	Kitt Peak	Spacewatch	·	3.0 km	MPC · JPL
207193	2005 EZ_{38}	—	March 3, 2005	Goodricke-Pigott	R. A. Tucker	·	2.3 km	MPC · JPL
207194	2005 EB_{43}	—	March 3, 2005	Kitt Peak	Spacewatch	·	1.7 km	MPC · JPL
207195	2005 EQ_{44}	—	March 3, 2005	Kitt Peak	Spacewatch	·	2.4 km	MPC · JPL
207196	2005 EQ_{47}	—	March 3, 2005	Catalina	CSS	MAR	1.4 km	MPC · JPL
207197	2005 EE_{48}	—	March 3, 2005	Catalina	CSS	·	2.4 km	MPC · JPL
207198	2005 EN_{49}	—	March 3, 2005	Catalina	CSS	·	1.8 km	MPC · JPL
207199	2005 ER_{49}	—	March 3, 2005	Catalina	CSS	·	3.9 km	MPC · JPL
207200	2005 EJ_{50}	—	March 3, 2005	Catalina	CSS	(5)	1.8 km	MPC · JPL

== 207201–207300 ==
back to top

Designation			Discovery			Properties		Ref
Permanent	Provisional	Named after	Date	Site	Discoverer(s)	Category	Diam.	Ref
207201	2005 EJ_{52}	—	March 4, 2005	Kitt Peak	Spacewatch	·	1.3 km	MPC · JPL
207202	2005 EZ_{53}	—	March 4, 2005	Kitt Peak	Spacewatch	·	2.4 km	MPC · JPL
207203	2005 EN_{62}	—	March 4, 2005	Mount Lemmon	Mount Lemmon Survey	·	2.2 km	MPC · JPL
207204	2005 EX_{64}	—	March 4, 2005	Socorro	LINEAR	·	2.3 km	MPC · JPL
207205	2005 ED_{66}	—	March 4, 2005	Catalina	CSS	·	2.0 km	MPC · JPL
207206	2005 EL_{66}	—	March 4, 2005	Catalina	CSS	·	2.5 km	MPC · JPL
207207	2005 EP_{69}	—	March 4, 2005	Catalina	CSS	EUN	2.4 km	MPC · JPL
207208	2005 EC_{72}	—	March 2, 2005	Catalina	CSS	PHO	3.9 km	MPC · JPL
207209	2005 ES_{72}	—	March 2, 2005	Catalina	CSS	·	1.3 km	MPC · JPL
207210	2005 EF_{74}	—	March 3, 2005	Kitt Peak	Spacewatch	·	2.1 km	MPC · JPL
207211	2005 EH_{76}	—	March 3, 2005	Kitt Peak	Spacewatch	AEO	1.7 km	MPC · JPL
207212	2005 EK_{76}	—	March 3, 2005	Kitt Peak	Spacewatch	·	1.2 km	MPC · JPL
207213	2005 ES_{76}	—	March 3, 2005	Kitt Peak	Spacewatch	·	2.1 km	MPC · JPL
207214	2005 EX_{78}	—	March 3, 2005	Catalina	CSS	·	1.6 km	MPC · JPL
207215	2005 EF_{81}	—	March 4, 2005	Kitt Peak	Spacewatch	·	2.0 km	MPC · JPL
207216	2005 ED_{86}	—	March 4, 2005	Socorro	LINEAR	·	2.9 km	MPC · JPL
207217	2005 EX_{87}	—	March 4, 2005	Mount Lemmon	Mount Lemmon Survey	NEM	3.3 km	MPC · JPL
207218	2005 EG_{89}	—	March 8, 2005	Kitt Peak	Spacewatch	·	2.4 km	MPC · JPL
207219	2005 ED_{93}	—	March 8, 2005	Socorro	LINEAR	MAR	2.6 km	MPC · JPL
207220	2005 EY_{96}	—	March 3, 2005	Catalina	CSS	·	1.7 km	MPC · JPL
207221	2005 EE_{112}	—	March 4, 2005	Socorro	LINEAR	JUN	1.7 km	MPC · JPL
207222	2005 EQ_{113}	—	March 4, 2005	Socorro	LINEAR	NEM	3.4 km	MPC · JPL
207223	2005 EV_{115}	—	March 4, 2005	Mount Lemmon	Mount Lemmon Survey	NEM	2.7 km	MPC · JPL
207224	2005 EG_{135}	—	March 9, 2005	Mount Lemmon	Mount Lemmon Survey	·	2.3 km	MPC · JPL
207225	2005 EW_{135}	—	March 9, 2005	Anderson Mesa	LONEOS	·	3.1 km	MPC · JPL
207226	2005 EX_{145}	—	March 10, 2005	Mount Lemmon	Mount Lemmon Survey	·	2.0 km	MPC · JPL
207227	2005 EL_{147}	—	March 10, 2005	Mount Lemmon	Mount Lemmon Survey	·	2.4 km	MPC · JPL
207228	2005 EE_{149}	—	March 10, 2005	Kitt Peak	Spacewatch	·	3.4 km	MPC · JPL
207229	2005 EA_{155}	—	March 8, 2005	Mount Lemmon	Mount Lemmon Survey	·	3.4 km	MPC · JPL
207230	2005 ED_{155}	—	March 8, 2005	Mount Lemmon	Mount Lemmon Survey	·	4.2 km	MPC · JPL
207231	2005 EM_{155}	—	March 8, 2005	Mount Lemmon	Mount Lemmon Survey	·	3.7 km	MPC · JPL
207232	2005 EN_{156}	—	March 9, 2005	Catalina	CSS	·	2.0 km	MPC · JPL
207233	2005 EC_{159}	—	March 9, 2005	Mount Lemmon	Mount Lemmon Survey	·	2.0 km	MPC · JPL
207234	2005 EH_{159}	—	March 9, 2005	Mount Lemmon	Mount Lemmon Survey	HOF	3.7 km	MPC · JPL
207235	2005 EB_{163}	—	March 10, 2005	Mount Lemmon	Mount Lemmon Survey	fast	2.9 km	MPC · JPL
207236	2005 EG_{163}	—	March 10, 2005	Mount Lemmon	Mount Lemmon Survey	·	2.1 km	MPC · JPL
207237	2005 EE_{166}	—	March 11, 2005	Mount Lemmon	Mount Lemmon Survey	·	4.0 km	MPC · JPL
207238	2005 EE_{168}	—	March 11, 2005	Mount Lemmon	Mount Lemmon Survey	KOR	1.9 km	MPC · JPL
207239	2005 EJ_{168}	—	March 11, 2005	Mount Lemmon	Mount Lemmon Survey	·	1.9 km	MPC · JPL
207240	2005 EB_{169}	—	March 11, 2005	Catalina	CSS	JUN	1.8 km	MPC · JPL
207241	2005 EJ_{172}	—	March 8, 2005	Anderson Mesa	LONEOS	·	4.3 km	MPC · JPL
207242	2005 EJ_{180}	—	March 9, 2005	Kitt Peak	Spacewatch	·	1.9 km	MPC · JPL
207243	2005 EU_{183}	—	March 9, 2005	Mount Lemmon	Mount Lemmon Survey	HOF	2.9 km	MPC · JPL
207244	2005 EH_{184}	—	March 9, 2005	Mount Lemmon	Mount Lemmon Survey	MIS	3.6 km	MPC · JPL
207245	2005 ER_{198}	—	March 11, 2005	Mount Lemmon	Mount Lemmon Survey	·	3.1 km	MPC · JPL
207246	2005 EN_{209}	—	March 4, 2005	Socorro	LINEAR	HNS	1.6 km	MPC · JPL
207247	2005 EO_{211}	—	March 4, 2005	Socorro	LINEAR	·	3.0 km	MPC · JPL
207248	2005 EN_{213}	—	March 4, 2005	Mount Lemmon	Mount Lemmon Survey	·	1.9 km	MPC · JPL
207249	2005 EF_{217}	—	March 9, 2005	Socorro	LINEAR	·	2.3 km	MPC · JPL
207250	2005 EC_{218}	—	March 9, 2005	Anderson Mesa	LONEOS	·	2.1 km	MPC · JPL
207251	2005 EC_{222}	—	March 4, 2005	Socorro	LINEAR	·	1.3 km	MPC · JPL
207252	2005 EY_{231}	—	March 10, 2005	Mount Lemmon	Mount Lemmon Survey	·	1.5 km	MPC · JPL
207253	2005 EC_{234}	—	March 10, 2005	Anderson Mesa	LONEOS	·	2.8 km	MPC · JPL
207254	2005 EX_{242}	—	March 11, 2005	Catalina	CSS	EUN	2.4 km	MPC · JPL
207255	2005 EJ_{243}	—	March 11, 2005	Catalina	CSS	·	3.5 km	MPC · JPL
207256	2005 EL_{247}	—	March 12, 2005	Kitt Peak	Spacewatch	·	1.7 km	MPC · JPL
207257	2005 EH_{248}	—	March 12, 2005	Kitt Peak	Spacewatch	·	1.6 km	MPC · JPL
207258	2005 EW_{250}	—	March 9, 2005	Socorro	LINEAR	·	1.9 km	MPC · JPL
207259	2005 EZ_{250}	—	March 10, 2005	Catalina	CSS	·	1.8 km	MPC · JPL
207260	2005 ES_{251}	—	March 10, 2005	Catalina	CSS	HNS	1.7 km	MPC · JPL
207261	2005 EP_{253}	—	March 11, 2005	Kitt Peak	Spacewatch	·	2.7 km	MPC · JPL
207262	2005 ER_{256}	—	March 11, 2005	Anderson Mesa	LONEOS	·	3.6 km	MPC · JPL
207263	2005 EO_{260}	—	March 11, 2005	Kitt Peak	Spacewatch	MRX	1.8 km	MPC · JPL
207264	2005 EW_{266}	—	March 13, 2005	Kitt Peak	Spacewatch	·	2.6 km	MPC · JPL
207265	2005 EQ_{271}	—	March 1, 2005	Kitt Peak	Spacewatch	·	2.0 km	MPC · JPL
207266	2005 EX_{271}	—	March 4, 2005	Mount Lemmon	Mount Lemmon Survey	·	2.4 km	MPC · JPL
207267	2005 EK_{280}	—	March 10, 2005	Catalina	CSS	·	3.0 km	MPC · JPL
207268	2005 EH_{281}	—	March 10, 2005	Anderson Mesa	LONEOS	·	2.2 km	MPC · JPL
207269	2005 EJ_{288}	—	March 8, 2005	Anderson Mesa	LONEOS	·	2.5 km	MPC · JPL
207270	2005 EA_{293}	—	March 10, 2005	Catalina	CSS	·	3.3 km	MPC · JPL
207271	2005 ER_{307}	—	March 8, 2005	Mount Lemmon	Mount Lemmon Survey	NEM	2.4 km	MPC · JPL
207272	2005 EB_{308}	—	March 8, 2005	Mount Lemmon	Mount Lemmon Survey	·	2.9 km	MPC · JPL
207273	2005 EL_{321}	—	March 8, 2005	Mayhill	Lowe, A.	·	1.6 km	MPC · JPL
207274	2005 EL_{325}	—	March 10, 2005	Catalina	CSS	·	3.2 km	MPC · JPL
207275	2005 EG_{327}	—	March 14, 2005	Mount Lemmon	Mount Lemmon Survey	·	2.2 km	MPC · JPL
207276	2005 EV_{327}	—	March 1, 2005	Catalina	CSS	·	2.6 km	MPC · JPL
207277	2005 FC_{6}	—	March 31, 2005	Anderson Mesa	LONEOS	·	2.8 km	MPC · JPL
207278	2005 FL_{6}	—	March 30, 2005	Catalina	CSS	GEF	2.0 km	MPC · JPL
207279	2005 FW_{6}	—	March 30, 2005	Catalina	CSS	GEF	1.8 km	MPC · JPL
207280	2005 FX_{7}	—	March 30, 2005	Catalina	CSS	·	2.3 km	MPC · JPL
207281	2005 GT_{2}	—	April 1, 2005	Anderson Mesa	LONEOS	·	2.7 km	MPC · JPL
207282	2005 GO_{5}	—	April 1, 2005	Kitt Peak	Spacewatch	·	2.6 km	MPC · JPL
207283	2005 GC_{8}	—	April 2, 2005	Anderson Mesa	LONEOS	·	2.3 km	MPC · JPL
207284	2005 GV_{11}	—	April 1, 2005	Anderson Mesa	LONEOS	·	3.8 km	MPC · JPL
207285	2005 GE_{12}	—	April 1, 2005	Anderson Mesa	LONEOS	·	3.6 km	MPC · JPL
207286	2005 GZ_{12}	—	April 1, 2005	Anderson Mesa	LONEOS	·	4.2 km	MPC · JPL
207287	2005 GN_{13}	—	April 1, 2005	Anderson Mesa	LONEOS	JUN	1.7 km	MPC · JPL
207288	2005 GJ_{14}	—	April 2, 2005	Kitt Peak	Spacewatch	·	2.7 km	MPC · JPL
207289	2005 GY_{22}	—	April 1, 2005	Anderson Mesa	LONEOS	fast	3.5 km	MPC · JPL
207290	2005 GT_{24}	—	April 2, 2005	Palomar	NEAT	·	2.3 km	MPC · JPL
207291	2005 GK_{27}	—	April 3, 2005	Palomar	NEAT	·	3.4 km	MPC · JPL
207292	2005 GJ_{28}	—	April 4, 2005	Kitt Peak	Spacewatch	·	2.6 km	MPC · JPL
207293	2005 GW_{30}	—	April 4, 2005	Mount Lemmon	Mount Lemmon Survey	KOR	1.7 km	MPC · JPL
207294	2005 GZ_{32}	—	April 4, 2005	Mount Lemmon	Mount Lemmon Survey	·	4.2 km	MPC · JPL
207295	2005 GH_{35}	—	April 2, 2005	Palomar	NEAT	·	2.8 km	MPC · JPL
207296	2005 GJ_{38}	—	April 3, 2005	Siding Spring	SSS	·	4.0 km	MPC · JPL
207297	2005 GU_{38}	—	April 4, 2005	Catalina	CSS	HOF	4.2 km	MPC · JPL
207298	2005 GF_{43}	—	April 5, 2005	Palomar	NEAT	·	2.3 km	MPC · JPL
207299	2005 GR_{45}	—	April 5, 2005	Catalina	CSS	·	4.0 km	MPC · JPL
207300	2005 GA_{48}	—	April 5, 2005	Palomar	NEAT	·	3.1 km	MPC · JPL

== 207301–207400 ==
back to top

Designation			Discovery			Properties		Ref
Permanent	Provisional	Named after	Date	Site	Discoverer(s)	Category	Diam.	Ref
207301	2005 GD_{50}	—	April 5, 2005	Mount Lemmon	Mount Lemmon Survey	HOF	3.7 km	MPC · JPL
207302	2005 GX_{50}	—	April 1, 2005	Anderson Mesa	LONEOS	·	3.4 km	MPC · JPL
207303	2005 GX_{51}	—	April 2, 2005	Mount Lemmon	Mount Lemmon Survey	·	3.1 km	MPC · JPL
207304	2005 GK_{56}	—	April 6, 2005	Mount Lemmon	Mount Lemmon Survey	·	2.2 km	MPC · JPL
207305	2005 GN_{56}	—	April 6, 2005	Mount Lemmon	Mount Lemmon Survey	·	2.4 km	MPC · JPL
207306	2005 GP_{56}	—	April 6, 2005	Kitt Peak	Spacewatch	·	2.7 km	MPC · JPL
207307	2005 GQ_{64}	—	April 2, 2005	Catalina	CSS	·	2.0 km	MPC · JPL
207308	2005 GC_{70}	—	April 4, 2005	Kitt Peak	Spacewatch	KOR	1.5 km	MPC · JPL
207309	2005 GL_{77}	—	April 6, 2005	Catalina	CSS	·	3.2 km	MPC · JPL
207310	2005 GZ_{77}	—	April 6, 2005	Catalina	CSS	·	3.3 km	MPC · JPL
207311	2005 GA_{80}	—	April 7, 2005	Anderson Mesa	LONEOS	·	5.3 km	MPC · JPL
207312	2005 GU_{81}	—	April 4, 2005	Kitt Peak	Spacewatch	·	1.9 km	MPC · JPL
207313	2005 GB_{94}	—	April 6, 2005	Mount Lemmon	Mount Lemmon Survey	·	2.8 km	MPC · JPL
207314	2005 GP_{94}	—	April 6, 2005	Kitt Peak	Spacewatch	·	1.9 km	MPC · JPL
207315	2005 GB_{95}	—	April 6, 2005	Kitt Peak	Spacewatch	THM	4.3 km	MPC · JPL
207316	2005 GN_{96}	—	April 6, 2005	Mount Lemmon	Mount Lemmon Survey	·	4.6 km	MPC · JPL
207317	2005 GN_{98}	—	April 7, 2005	Kitt Peak	Spacewatch	KOR	1.6 km	MPC · JPL
207318	2005 GW_{103}	—	April 9, 2005	Catalina	CSS	EUN	2.0 km	MPC · JPL
207319 Eugenemar	2005 GZ_{109}	Eugenemar	April 10, 2005	Mount Lemmon	Mount Lemmon Survey	EUN	2.1 km	MPC · JPL
207320	2005 GJ_{110}	—	April 10, 2005	Mount Lemmon	Mount Lemmon Survey	KOR	1.6 km	MPC · JPL
207321 Crawshaw	2005 GL_{110}	Crawshaw	April 10, 2005	Mount Lemmon	Mount Lemmon Survey	·	3.1 km	MPC · JPL
207322	2005 GY_{111}	—	April 6, 2005	Catalina	CSS	·	2.9 km	MPC · JPL
207323	2005 GQ_{119}	—	April 10, 2005	Siding Spring	SSS	·	2.4 km	MPC · JPL
207324	2005 GV_{130}	—	April 9, 2005	Kitt Peak	Spacewatch	·	3.7 km	MPC · JPL
207325	2005 GC_{132}	—	April 10, 2005	Kitt Peak	Spacewatch	·	2.0 km	MPC · JPL
207326	2005 GK_{135}	—	April 10, 2005	Kitt Peak	Spacewatch	·	3.4 km	MPC · JPL
207327	2005 GE_{140}	—	April 12, 2005	Mount Lemmon	Mount Lemmon Survey	·	1.5 km	MPC · JPL
207328	2005 GW_{145}	—	April 11, 2005	Kitt Peak	Spacewatch	KOR	1.9 km	MPC · JPL
207329	2005 GH_{147}	—	April 11, 2005	Kitt Peak	Spacewatch	·	1.7 km	MPC · JPL
207330	2005 GS_{147}	—	April 11, 2005	Kitt Peak	Spacewatch	·	2.3 km	MPC · JPL
207331	2005 GH_{157}	—	April 11, 2005	Anderson Mesa	LONEOS	·	2.2 km	MPC · JPL
207332	2005 GA_{162}	—	April 14, 2005	Kitt Peak	Spacewatch	·	2.4 km	MPC · JPL
207333	2005 GX_{172}	—	April 14, 2005	Kitt Peak	Spacewatch	·	2.4 km	MPC · JPL
207334	2005 GN_{181}	—	April 12, 2005	Kitt Peak	Spacewatch	·	2.0 km	MPC · JPL
207335	2005 GD_{209}	—	April 2, 2005	Catalina	CSS	TIR	4.4 km	MPC · JPL
207336	2005 GV_{225}	—	April 4, 2005	Kitt Peak	Spacewatch	·	2.9 km	MPC · JPL
207337	2005 HB_{2}	—	April 16, 2005	Kitt Peak	Spacewatch	·	3.0 km	MPC · JPL
207338	2005 HG_{2}	—	April 17, 2005	Kitt Peak	Spacewatch	MRX	1.8 km	MPC · JPL
207339	2005 HQ_{3}	—	April 19, 2005	Catalina	CSS	·	2.1 km	MPC · JPL
207340	2005 JQ_{2}	—	May 3, 2005	Kitt Peak	Spacewatch	AEO	1.5 km	MPC · JPL
207341 Isabelmartin	2005 JD_{22}	Isabelmartin	May 3, 2005	La Cañada	Lacruz, J.	·	2.5 km	MPC · JPL
207342	2005 JU_{22}	—	May 1, 2005	Palomar	NEAT	·	1.4 km	MPC · JPL
207343	2005 JG_{26}	—	May 3, 2005	Kitt Peak	Spacewatch	·	4.3 km	MPC · JPL
207344	2005 JQ_{29}	—	May 3, 2005	Socorro	LINEAR	·	2.9 km	MPC · JPL
207345	2005 JX_{30}	—	May 4, 2005	Mount Lemmon	Mount Lemmon Survey	·	2.4 km	MPC · JPL
207346	2005 JV_{32}	—	May 4, 2005	Mount Lemmon	Mount Lemmon Survey	(1298)	4.4 km	MPC · JPL
207347	2005 JW_{35}	—	May 4, 2005	Kitt Peak	Spacewatch	·	3.1 km	MPC · JPL
207348	2005 JD_{48}	—	May 3, 2005	Kitt Peak	Spacewatch	(1298)	4.6 km	MPC · JPL
207349	2005 JE_{54}	—	May 4, 2005	Kitt Peak	Spacewatch	HYG	5.2 km	MPC · JPL
207350	2005 JH_{59}	—	May 8, 2005	Mount Lemmon	Mount Lemmon Survey	·	2.3 km	MPC · JPL
207351	2005 JP_{68}	—	May 6, 2005	Catalina	CSS	EUN	2.0 km	MPC · JPL
207352	2005 JT_{69}	—	May 7, 2005	Kitt Peak	Spacewatch	·	2.1 km	MPC · JPL
207353	2005 JA_{91}	—	May 11, 2005	Palomar	NEAT	·	2.7 km	MPC · JPL
207354	2005 JK_{114}	—	May 10, 2005	Anderson Mesa	LONEOS	·	2.7 km	MPC · JPL
207355	2005 JU_{118}	—	May 10, 2005	Kitt Peak	Spacewatch	·	2.2 km	MPC · JPL
207356	2005 JU_{135}	—	May 8, 2005	Kitt Peak	Spacewatch	·	1.3 km	MPC · JPL
207357	2005 JY_{135}	—	May 8, 2005	Catalina	CSS	NEM	3.7 km	MPC · JPL
207358	2005 JK_{136}	—	May 11, 2005	Catalina	CSS	·	5.3 km	MPC · JPL
207359	2005 JD_{137}	—	May 13, 2005	Kitt Peak	Spacewatch	·	2.3 km	MPC · JPL
207360	2005 JD_{138}	—	May 13, 2005	Kitt Peak	Spacewatch	EOS	4.6 km	MPC · JPL
207361	2005 JW_{145}	—	May 12, 2005	Mount Lemmon	Mount Lemmon Survey	EOS	2.6 km	MPC · JPL
207362	2005 JE_{147}	—	May 15, 2005	Palomar	NEAT	·	5.8 km	MPC · JPL
207363	2005 JE_{148}	—	May 15, 2005	Palomar	NEAT	·	2.5 km	MPC · JPL
207364	2005 JR_{162}	—	May 8, 2005	Kitt Peak	Spacewatch	fast	2.8 km	MPC · JPL
207365	2005 JJ_{163}	—	May 8, 2005	Siding Spring	SSS	·	2.6 km	MPC · JPL
207366	2005 KA_{8}	—	May 20, 2005	Mount Lemmon	Mount Lemmon Survey	·	3.7 km	MPC · JPL
207367	2005 LR_{2}	—	June 2, 2005	Catalina	CSS	·	4.0 km	MPC · JPL
207368	2005 LG_{10}	—	June 3, 2005	Kitt Peak	Spacewatch	·	2.6 km	MPC · JPL
207369	2005 LL_{11}	—	June 3, 2005	Kitt Peak	Spacewatch	3:2	7.6 km	MPC · JPL
207370	2005 LZ_{16}	—	June 6, 2005	Kitt Peak	Spacewatch	·	4.2 km	MPC · JPL
207371	2005 LJ_{33}	—	June 10, 2005	Kitt Peak	Spacewatch	HOF	3.2 km	MPC · JPL
207372	2005 LB_{36}	—	June 12, 2005	Mount Lemmon	Mount Lemmon Survey	KOR	1.6 km	MPC · JPL
207373	2005 LB_{39}	—	June 11, 2005	Kitt Peak	Spacewatch	·	3.8 km	MPC · JPL
207374	2005 LJ_{42}	—	June 13, 2005	Mount Lemmon	Mount Lemmon Survey	THM	3.6 km	MPC · JPL
207375	2005 MC_{14}	—	June 28, 2005	Kitt Peak	Spacewatch	·	2.7 km	MPC · JPL
207376	2005 MR_{41}	—	June 30, 2005	Kitt Peak	Spacewatch	CYB	4.4 km	MPC · JPL
207377	2005 NG_{18}	—	July 4, 2005	Mount Lemmon	Mount Lemmon Survey	THM	3.0 km	MPC · JPL
207378	2005 NE_{28}	—	July 5, 2005	Palomar	NEAT	SYL · CYB	5.3 km	MPC · JPL
207379	2005 NJ_{38}	—	July 6, 2005	Kitt Peak	Spacewatch	3:2	6.4 km	MPC · JPL
207380	2005 OH_{7}	—	July 28, 2005	Palomar	NEAT	3:2 · SHU	9.3 km	MPC · JPL
207381	2005 QW_{7}	—	August 24, 2005	Palomar	NEAT	3:2	7.3 km	MPC · JPL
207382	2005 QU_{28}	—	August 28, 2005	Drebach	J. Kandler	HIL · 3:2	8.1 km	MPC · JPL
207383	2005 QT_{123}	—	August 28, 2005	Kitt Peak	Spacewatch	·	4.9 km	MPC · JPL
207384	2005 QO_{173}	—	August 29, 2005	Palomar	NEAT	T_{j} (2.99) · HIL · 3:2	10 km	MPC · JPL
207385 Maxou	2005 RU_{4}	Maxou	September 4, 2005	Marly	P. Kocher	EUP	8.2 km	MPC · JPL
207386	2005 TN_{105}	—	October 8, 2005	Catalina	CSS	H	960 m	MPC · JPL
207387	2005 TT_{127}	—	October 7, 2005	Kitt Peak	Spacewatch	3:2 · SHU	6.1 km	MPC · JPL
207388	2005 TT_{170}	—	October 12, 2005	Kitt Peak	Spacewatch	·	2.8 km	MPC · JPL
207389	2005 VK_{7}	—	November 12, 2005	Socorro	LINEAR	H	1.2 km	MPC · JPL
207390	2005 VJ_{99}	—	November 11, 2005	Socorro	LINEAR	H	810 m	MPC · JPL
207391	2005 WT_{3}	—	November 22, 2005	Socorro	LINEAR	H	820 m	MPC · JPL
207392	2005 WO_{54}	—	November 25, 2005	Kitt Peak	Spacewatch	H	870 m	MPC · JPL
207393	2005 WM_{56}	—	November 22, 2005	Kitt Peak	Spacewatch	H	1.0 km	MPC · JPL
207394 Rickfitzgerald	2005 XL_{101}	Rickfitzgerald	December 1, 2005	Kitt Peak	M. W. Buie	·	890 m	MPC · JPL
207395	2005 YW_{118}	—	December 26, 2005	Mount Lemmon	Mount Lemmon Survey	·	1.4 km	MPC · JPL
207396	2005 YE_{254}	—	December 29, 2005	Kitt Peak	Spacewatch	·	1.5 km	MPC · JPL
207397	2005 YZ_{273}	—	December 30, 2005	Mount Lemmon	Mount Lemmon Survey	·	970 m	MPC · JPL
207398	2006 AS_{2}	—	January 5, 2006	Mount Lemmon	Mount Lemmon Survey	APO · PHA	300 m	MPC · JPL
207399	2006 AG_{40}	—	January 7, 2006	Mount Lemmon	Mount Lemmon Survey	·	930 m	MPC · JPL
207400	2006 BN_{53}	—	January 25, 2006	Kitt Peak	Spacewatch	·	880 m	MPC · JPL

== 207401–207500 ==
back to top

Designation			Discovery			Properties		Ref
Permanent	Provisional	Named after	Date	Site	Discoverer(s)	Category	Diam.	Ref
207401	2006 BE_{62}	—	January 22, 2006	Catalina	CSS	·	1.1 km	MPC · JPL
207402	2006 BR_{80}	—	January 23, 2006	Kitt Peak	Spacewatch	·	910 m	MPC · JPL
207403	2006 BB_{83}	—	January 24, 2006	Socorro	LINEAR	·	910 m	MPC · JPL
207404	2006 BU_{91}	—	January 26, 2006	Kitt Peak	Spacewatch	NYS	1.4 km	MPC · JPL
207405	2006 BP_{103}	—	January 23, 2006	Mount Lemmon	Mount Lemmon Survey	·	1.0 km	MPC · JPL
207406	2006 BG_{147}	—	January 26, 2006	Mount Lemmon	Mount Lemmon Survey	·	910 m	MPC · JPL
207407	2006 BZ_{168}	—	January 26, 2006	Mount Lemmon	Mount Lemmon Survey	·	1.2 km	MPC · JPL
207408	2006 BY_{172}	—	January 27, 2006	Kitt Peak	Spacewatch	·	1.4 km	MPC · JPL
207409	2006 BD_{213}	—	January 30, 2006	Bergisch Gladbach	W. Bickel	·	710 m	MPC · JPL
207410	2006 BC_{252}	—	January 31, 2006	Kitt Peak	Spacewatch	·	980 m	MPC · JPL
207411	2006 BH_{267}	—	January 26, 2006	Anderson Mesa	LONEOS	·	1.0 km	MPC · JPL
207412	2006 BM_{275}	—	January 31, 2006	Mount Lemmon	Mount Lemmon Survey	NYS	1.6 km	MPC · JPL
207413	2006 DF_{4}	—	February 20, 2006	Catalina	CSS	·	1.9 km	MPC · JPL
207414	2006 DG_{27}	—	February 20, 2006	Kitt Peak	Spacewatch	NYS	1.3 km	MPC · JPL
207415	2006 DY_{33}	—	February 20, 2006	Kitt Peak	Spacewatch	·	1.0 km	MPC · JPL
207416	2006 DC_{34}	—	February 20, 2006	Kitt Peak	Spacewatch	·	1.4 km	MPC · JPL
207417	2006 DA_{44}	—	February 20, 2006	Kitt Peak	Spacewatch	·	1.0 km	MPC · JPL
207418	2006 DM_{54}	—	February 24, 2006	Kitt Peak	Spacewatch	KOR	2.1 km	MPC · JPL
207419	2006 DG_{59}	—	February 24, 2006	Mount Lemmon	Mount Lemmon Survey	·	1.6 km	MPC · JPL
207420 Jehin	2006 DR_{65}	Jehin	February 21, 2006	Anderson Mesa	LONEOS	NYS	1.5 km	MPC · JPL
207421	2006 DK_{79}	—	February 24, 2006	Kitt Peak	Spacewatch	·	770 m	MPC · JPL
207422	2006 DM_{82}	—	February 24, 2006	Kitt Peak	Spacewatch	MAS	1.1 km	MPC · JPL
207423	2006 DH_{84}	—	February 24, 2006	Kitt Peak	Spacewatch	·	2.1 km	MPC · JPL
207424	2006 DG_{94}	—	February 24, 2006	Kitt Peak	Spacewatch	THM	3.2 km	MPC · JPL
207425	2006 DA_{97}	—	February 24, 2006	Mount Lemmon	Mount Lemmon Survey	·	1.1 km	MPC · JPL
207426	2006 DG_{102}	—	February 25, 2006	Kitt Peak	Spacewatch	NYS	1.6 km	MPC · JPL
207427	2006 DA_{104}	—	February 25, 2006	Mount Lemmon	Mount Lemmon Survey	·	1.1 km	MPC · JPL
207428	2006 DF_{105}	—	February 25, 2006	Mount Lemmon	Mount Lemmon Survey	·	620 m	MPC · JPL
207429	2006 DY_{105}	—	February 25, 2006	Mount Lemmon	Mount Lemmon Survey	·	930 m	MPC · JPL
207430	2006 DT_{114}	—	February 27, 2006	Kitt Peak	Spacewatch	·	940 m	MPC · JPL
207431	2006 DS_{145}	—	February 25, 2006	Mount Lemmon	Mount Lemmon Survey	·	880 m	MPC · JPL
207432	2006 DE_{187}	—	February 27, 2006	Kitt Peak	Spacewatch	·	4.1 km	MPC · JPL
207433	2006 DG_{190}	—	February 27, 2006	Kitt Peak	Spacewatch	·	2.5 km	MPC · JPL
207434	2006 DR_{192}	—	February 27, 2006	Kitt Peak	Spacewatch	·	990 m	MPC · JPL
207435	2006 DA_{199}	—	February 28, 2006	Socorro	LINEAR	·	1.3 km	MPC · JPL
207436	2006 DB_{208}	—	February 25, 2006	Kitt Peak	Spacewatch	·	1.6 km	MPC · JPL
207437	2006 DH_{209}	—	February 27, 2006	Kitt Peak	Spacewatch	·	1.3 km	MPC · JPL
207438	2006 DQ_{214}	—	February 21, 2006	Mount Lemmon	Mount Lemmon Survey	NYS	1.5 km	MPC · JPL
207439	2006 EG_{1}	—	March 5, 2006	Mount Lemmon	Mount Lemmon Survey	·	1.6 km	MPC · JPL
207440	2006 EW_{5}	—	March 2, 2006	Kitt Peak	Spacewatch	NYS	2.0 km	MPC · JPL
207441	2006 ED_{16}	—	March 2, 2006	Kitt Peak	Spacewatch	·	1.3 km	MPC · JPL
207442	2006 EF_{16}	—	March 2, 2006	Kitt Peak	Spacewatch	·	990 m	MPC · JPL
207443	2006 EQ_{23}	—	March 3, 2006	Kitt Peak	Spacewatch	MIS	3.2 km	MPC · JPL
207444	2006 EG_{31}	—	March 3, 2006	Kitt Peak	Spacewatch	·	1.5 km	MPC · JPL
207445	2006 EU_{45}	—	March 3, 2006	Kitt Peak	Spacewatch	·	1.0 km	MPC · JPL
207446	2006 EC_{63}	—	March 5, 2006	Kitt Peak	Spacewatch	·	1.0 km	MPC · JPL
207447	2006 EX_{65}	—	March 5, 2006	Kitt Peak	Spacewatch	·	1.0 km	MPC · JPL
207448	2006 FV_{12}	—	March 23, 2006	Kitt Peak	Spacewatch	KOR	1.9 km	MPC · JPL
207449	2006 FR_{17}	—	March 23, 2006	Kitt Peak	Spacewatch	·	1.8 km	MPC · JPL
207450	2006 FZ_{23}	—	March 24, 2006	Kitt Peak	Spacewatch	·	750 m	MPC · JPL
207451	2006 FH_{34}	—	March 24, 2006	Catalina	CSS	V	1.1 km	MPC · JPL
207452	2006 FV_{36}	—	March 23, 2006	Socorro	LINEAR	·	2.6 km	MPC · JPL
207453	2006 FH_{37}	—	March 24, 2006	Socorro	LINEAR	·	1.3 km	MPC · JPL
207454	2006 FU_{40}	—	March 26, 2006	Mount Lemmon	Mount Lemmon Survey	·	790 m	MPC · JPL
207455	2006 GV_{4}	—	April 2, 2006	Kitt Peak	Spacewatch	·	1.2 km	MPC · JPL
207456	2006 GZ_{6}	—	April 2, 2006	Kitt Peak	Spacewatch	·	1.5 km	MPC · JPL
207457	2006 GQ_{9}	—	April 2, 2006	Kitt Peak	Spacewatch	V	870 m	MPC · JPL
207458	2006 GG_{15}	—	April 2, 2006	Kitt Peak	Spacewatch	·	2.9 km	MPC · JPL
207459	2006 GJ_{19}	—	April 2, 2006	Kitt Peak	Spacewatch	·	1.2 km	MPC · JPL
207460	2006 GX_{32}	—	April 7, 2006	Kitt Peak	Spacewatch	·	1.8 km	MPC · JPL
207461	2006 GG_{36}	—	April 7, 2006	Anderson Mesa	LONEOS	·	3.6 km	MPC · JPL
207462	2006 GG_{37}	—	April 8, 2006	Mount Lemmon	Mount Lemmon Survey	·	3.0 km	MPC · JPL
207463	2006 GW_{38}	—	April 6, 2006	Siding Spring	SSS	·	1.4 km	MPC · JPL
207464	2006 GH_{40}	—	April 6, 2006	Socorro	LINEAR	·	1.4 km	MPC · JPL
207465	2006 GN_{41}	—	April 7, 2006	Catalina	CSS	·	1.2 km	MPC · JPL
207466	2006 GH_{42}	—	April 9, 2006	Socorro	LINEAR	·	1.6 km	MPC · JPL
207467	2006 GL_{43}	—	April 2, 2006	Kitt Peak	Spacewatch	·	1.5 km	MPC · JPL
207468	2006 GE_{46}	—	April 8, 2006	Kitt Peak	Spacewatch	·	1.2 km	MPC · JPL
207469	2006 GK_{49}	—	April 6, 2006	Socorro	LINEAR	·	1.2 km	MPC · JPL
207470	2006 HZ_{3}	—	April 18, 2006	Palomar	NEAT	NYS	1.2 km	MPC · JPL
207471	2006 HL_{6}	—	April 18, 2006	Anderson Mesa	LONEOS	·	1.7 km	MPC · JPL
207472	2006 HT_{6}	—	April 18, 2006	Anderson Mesa	LONEOS	·	1.6 km	MPC · JPL
207473	2006 HU_{13}	—	April 19, 2006	Palomar	NEAT	·	1.4 km	MPC · JPL
207474	2006 HP_{16}	—	April 20, 2006	Kitt Peak	Spacewatch	·	1.8 km	MPC · JPL
207475	2006 HS_{20}	—	April 19, 2006	Mount Lemmon	Mount Lemmon Survey	·	1.1 km	MPC · JPL
207476	2006 HJ_{22}	—	April 20, 2006	Kitt Peak	Spacewatch	·	1.2 km	MPC · JPL
207477	2006 HK_{23}	—	April 20, 2006	Kitt Peak	Spacewatch	·	1.7 km	MPC · JPL
207478	2006 HD_{25}	—	April 20, 2006	Catalina	CSS	NYS	1.5 km	MPC · JPL
207479	2006 HL_{27}	—	April 20, 2006	Mount Lemmon	Mount Lemmon Survey	·	1.7 km	MPC · JPL
207480	2006 HC_{29}	—	April 21, 2006	Catalina	CSS	·	1.2 km	MPC · JPL
207481 Kékes	2006 HC_{31}	Kékes	April 24, 2006	Piszkéstető	K. Sárneczky	·	980 m	MPC · JPL
207482	2006 HN_{31}	—	April 18, 2006	Palomar	NEAT	·	1.1 km	MPC · JPL
207483	2006 HD_{41}	—	April 21, 2006	Kitt Peak	Spacewatch	·	2.4 km	MPC · JPL
207484	2006 HY_{42}	—	April 24, 2006	Mount Lemmon	Mount Lemmon Survey	·	1.4 km	MPC · JPL
207485	2006 HN_{46}	—	April 19, 2006	Catalina	CSS	·	1.7 km	MPC · JPL
207486	2006 HE_{48}	—	April 24, 2006	Kitt Peak	Spacewatch	·	890 m	MPC · JPL
207487	2006 HS_{51}	—	April 26, 2006	Reedy Creek	J. Broughton	·	3.3 km	MPC · JPL
207488	2006 HV_{51}	—	April 26, 2006	Reedy Creek	J. Broughton	·	1.2 km	MPC · JPL
207489	2006 HT_{53}	—	April 19, 2006	Catalina	CSS	·	1.1 km	MPC · JPL
207490	2006 HC_{54}	—	April 20, 2006	Catalina	CSS	·	1.0 km	MPC · JPL
207491	2006 HS_{59}	—	April 24, 2006	Socorro	LINEAR	·	970 m	MPC · JPL
207492	2006 HT_{61}	—	April 24, 2006	Kitt Peak	Spacewatch	NYS	1.4 km	MPC · JPL
207493	2006 HG_{66}	—	April 24, 2006	Kitt Peak	Spacewatch	AGN	1.7 km	MPC · JPL
207494	2006 HV_{68}	—	April 24, 2006	Kitt Peak	Spacewatch	·	1.1 km	MPC · JPL
207495	2006 HK_{72}	—	April 25, 2006	Kitt Peak	Spacewatch	·	1.7 km	MPC · JPL
207496	2006 HU_{78}	—	April 26, 2006	Kitt Peak	Spacewatch	·	1.5 km	MPC · JPL
207497	2006 HO_{90}	—	April 26, 2006	Kitt Peak	Spacewatch	·	2.0 km	MPC · JPL
207498	2006 HH_{98}	—	April 30, 2006	Kitt Peak	Spacewatch	·	1.6 km	MPC · JPL
207499	2006 HW_{108}	—	April 30, 2006	Catalina	CSS	·	1.2 km	MPC · JPL
207500	2006 HC_{111}	—	April 19, 2006	Catalina	CSS	·	1.6 km	MPC · JPL

== 207501–207600 ==
back to top

Designation			Discovery			Properties		Ref
Permanent	Provisional	Named after	Date	Site	Discoverer(s)	Category	Diam.	Ref
207501	2006 HQ_{111}	—	April 29, 2006	Siding Spring	SSS	·	1.4 km	MPC · JPL
207502	2006 HZ_{111}	—	April 30, 2006	Catalina	CSS	·	1.6 km	MPC · JPL
207503	2006 HY_{120}	—	April 30, 2006	Kitt Peak	Spacewatch	·	1.7 km	MPC · JPL
207504 Markusovszky	2006 HK_{152}	Markusovszky	April 25, 2006	Piszkéstető	K. Sárneczky	(5)	1.3 km	MPC · JPL
207505	2006 JU_{1}	—	May 1, 2006	Socorro	LINEAR	DOR	3.3 km	MPC · JPL
207506	2006 JU_{4}	—	May 2, 2006	Mount Lemmon	Mount Lemmon Survey	NYS	1.6 km	MPC · JPL
207507	2006 JX_{5}	—	May 3, 2006	Mount Lemmon	Mount Lemmon Survey	·	1.7 km	MPC · JPL
207508	2006 JA_{12}	—	May 1, 2006	Kitt Peak	Spacewatch	·	1.9 km	MPC · JPL
207509	2006 JP_{12}	—	May 1, 2006	Kitt Peak	Spacewatch	·	2.0 km	MPC · JPL
207510	2006 JF_{14}	—	May 4, 2006	Mount Lemmon	Mount Lemmon Survey	NYS	1.6 km	MPC · JPL
207511	2006 JT_{16}	—	May 2, 2006	Kitt Peak	Spacewatch	NYS	1.6 km	MPC · JPL
207512	2006 JU_{17}	—	May 2, 2006	Mount Lemmon	Mount Lemmon Survey	·	2.4 km	MPC · JPL
207513	2006 JO_{28}	—	May 3, 2006	Kitt Peak	Spacewatch	·	4.6 km	MPC · JPL
207514	2006 JD_{29}	—	May 3, 2006	Kitt Peak	Spacewatch	·	1.7 km	MPC · JPL
207515	2006 JO_{30}	—	May 3, 2006	Kitt Peak	Spacewatch	·	1.5 km	MPC · JPL
207516	2006 JE_{34}	—	May 4, 2006	Kitt Peak	Spacewatch	·	1.8 km	MPC · JPL
207517	2006 JN_{34}	—	May 4, 2006	Kitt Peak	Spacewatch	·	4.5 km	MPC · JPL
207518	2006 JC_{36}	—	May 4, 2006	Kitt Peak	Spacewatch	·	1.2 km	MPC · JPL
207519	2006 JR_{40}	—	May 7, 2006	Kitt Peak	Spacewatch	KOR	1.8 km	MPC · JPL
207520	2006 JH_{45}	—	May 7, 2006	Mount Lemmon	Mount Lemmon Survey	·	1.6 km	MPC · JPL
207521	2006 JD_{49}	—	May 1, 2006	Junk Bond	D. Healy	NYS	1.3 km	MPC · JPL
207522	2006 JB_{54}	—	May 7, 2006	Mount Lemmon	Mount Lemmon Survey	MAS	930 m	MPC · JPL
207523	2006 JE_{54}	—	May 7, 2006	Mount Lemmon	Mount Lemmon Survey	·	3.8 km	MPC · JPL
207524	2006 JV_{79}	—	May 9, 2006	Mount Lemmon	Mount Lemmon Survey	·	2.5 km	MPC · JPL
207525	2006 JW_{79}	—	May 6, 2006	Mount Lemmon	Mount Lemmon Survey	·	2.1 km	MPC · JPL
207526	2006 JP_{80}	—	May 8, 2006	Mount Lemmon	Mount Lemmon Survey	·	1.8 km	MPC · JPL
207527	2006 KF	—	May 16, 2006	Palomar	NEAT	·	2.5 km	MPC · JPL
207528	2006 KJ_{2}	—	May 18, 2006	Palomar	NEAT	·	900 m	MPC · JPL
207529	2006 KB_{4}	—	May 19, 2006	Anderson Mesa	LONEOS	ADE	2.8 km	MPC · JPL
207530	2006 KT_{11}	—	May 19, 2006	Palomar	NEAT	·	2.0 km	MPC · JPL
207531	2006 KQ_{13}	—	May 20, 2006	Palomar	NEAT	·	2.0 km	MPC · JPL
207532	2006 KU_{21}	—	May 19, 2006	Mount Lemmon	Mount Lemmon Survey	·	4.0 km	MPC · JPL
207533	2006 KM_{23}	—	May 16, 2006	Siding Spring	SSS	NYS	2.4 km	MPC · JPL
207534	2006 KZ_{25}	—	May 20, 2006	Kitt Peak	Spacewatch	EUN	1.8 km	MPC · JPL
207535	2006 KP_{32}	—	May 20, 2006	Kitt Peak	Spacewatch	·	1.2 km	MPC · JPL
207536	2006 KE_{38}	—	May 16, 2006	Siding Spring	SSS	·	1.6 km	MPC · JPL
207537	2006 KF_{39}	—	May 18, 2006	Palomar	NEAT	·	1.6 km	MPC · JPL
207538	2006 KM_{52}	—	May 21, 2006	Kitt Peak	Spacewatch	·	1.8 km	MPC · JPL
207539	2006 KR_{54}	—	May 21, 2006	Kitt Peak	Spacewatch	·	2.4 km	MPC · JPL
207540	2006 KD_{56}	—	May 21, 2006	Siding Spring	SSS	·	2.0 km	MPC · JPL
207541	2006 KT_{57}	—	May 22, 2006	Kitt Peak	Spacewatch	·	1.4 km	MPC · JPL
207542	2006 KW_{57}	—	May 22, 2006	Kitt Peak	Spacewatch	·	1.6 km	MPC · JPL
207543	2006 KK_{61}	—	May 22, 2006	Kitt Peak	Spacewatch	V	1.1 km	MPC · JPL
207544	2006 KX_{90}	—	May 24, 2006	Palomar	NEAT	(5)	2.3 km	MPC · JPL
207545	2006 KK_{120}	—	May 31, 2006	Kitt Peak	Spacewatch	ADE	3.1 km	MPC · JPL
207546	2006 LL	—	June 1, 2006	Mount Lemmon	Mount Lemmon Survey	NYS	1.4 km	MPC · JPL
207547 Charito	2006 LO	Charito	June 2, 2006	La Cañada	Lacruz, J.	·	3.0 km	MPC · JPL
207548	2006 LZ	—	June 4, 2006	Wrightwood	J. W. Young	·	1.9 km	MPC · JPL
207549	2006 LR_{1}	—	June 5, 2006	Socorro	LINEAR	NYS	2.0 km	MPC · JPL
207550	2006 LM_{2}	—	June 2, 2006	Mount Lemmon	Mount Lemmon Survey	NYS	1.3 km	MPC · JPL
207551	2006 LS_{3}	—	June 15, 2006	Kitt Peak	Spacewatch	EUN	2.2 km	MPC · JPL
207552	2006 LL_{4}	—	June 10, 2006	Palomar	NEAT	·	3.4 km	MPC · JPL
207553	2006 LU_{4}	—	June 6, 2006	Siding Spring	SSS	·	1.2 km	MPC · JPL
207554	2006 LZ_{4}	—	June 14, 2006	Palomar	NEAT	·	3.7 km	MPC · JPL
207555	2006 LS_{5}	—	June 4, 2006	Socorro	LINEAR	·	2.8 km	MPC · JPL
207556	2006 LU_{5}	—	June 3, 2006	Mount Lemmon	Mount Lemmon Survey	·	4.7 km	MPC · JPL
207557	2006 MS_{7}	—	June 18, 2006	Kitt Peak	Spacewatch	EOS	2.9 km	MPC · JPL
207558	2006 MU_{7}	—	June 18, 2006	Kitt Peak	Spacewatch	·	2.5 km	MPC · JPL
207559	2006 OQ_{1}	—	July 17, 2006	Reedy Creek	J. Broughton	MRX	1.7 km	MPC · JPL
207560	2006 OU_{7}	—	July 19, 2006	Palomar	NEAT	·	3.5 km	MPC · JPL
207561	2006 OU_{12}	—	July 19, 2006	Palomar	NEAT	·	6.6 km	MPC · JPL
207562	2006 OW_{15}	—	July 30, 2006	Eskridge	Farpoint	EUP	7.8 km	MPC · JPL
207563 Toscana	2006 PC	Toscana	August 1, 2006	Vallemare Borbona	V. S. Casulli	·	4.4 km	MPC · JPL
207564	2006 PZ	—	August 13, 2006	Dax	Dax	·	2.5 km	MPC · JPL
207565	2006 PM_{1}	—	August 10, 2006	Palomar	NEAT	·	7.3 km	MPC · JPL
207566	2006 PQ_{2}	—	August 12, 2006	Palomar	NEAT	·	2.8 km	MPC · JPL
207567	2006 PN_{4}	—	August 14, 2006	Hibiscus	S. F. Hönig	·	2.2 km	MPC · JPL
207568	2006 PW_{6}	—	August 12, 2006	Palomar	NEAT	·	5.4 km	MPC · JPL
207569	2006 PP_{8}	—	August 13, 2006	Palomar	NEAT	MAS	990 m	MPC · JPL
207570	2006 PQ_{12}	—	August 13, 2006	Palomar	NEAT	·	3.6 km	MPC · JPL
207571	2006 PY_{13}	—	August 14, 2006	Siding Spring	SSS	·	3.3 km	MPC · JPL
207572	2006 PQ_{16}	—	August 15, 2006	Palomar	NEAT	·	4.5 km	MPC · JPL
207573	2006 PP_{19}	—	August 13, 2006	Palomar	NEAT	·	3.6 km	MPC · JPL
207574	2006 PZ_{21}	—	August 15, 2006	Palomar	NEAT	·	2.9 km	MPC · JPL
207575	2006 PN_{23}	—	August 12, 2006	Palomar	NEAT	·	1.8 km	MPC · JPL
207576	2006 PB_{31}	—	August 13, 2006	Palomar	NEAT	VER	4.4 km	MPC · JPL
207577	2006 PF_{31}	—	August 13, 2006	Palomar	NEAT	HOF	3.4 km	MPC · JPL
207578	2006 PK_{43}	—	August 13, 2006	Palomar	NEAT	KOR	1.8 km	MPC · JPL
207579	2006 QM_{2}	—	August 17, 2006	Palomar	NEAT	·	3.0 km	MPC · JPL
207580	2006 QX_{2}	—	August 17, 2006	Palomar	NEAT	·	6.6 km	MPC · JPL
207581	2006 QY_{7}	—	August 19, 2006	Kitt Peak	Spacewatch	·	2.5 km	MPC · JPL
207582	2006 QE_{9}	—	August 19, 2006	Kitt Peak	Spacewatch	·	5.1 km	MPC · JPL
207583	2006 QF_{15}	—	August 17, 2006	Palomar	NEAT	·	3.7 km	MPC · JPL
207584	2006 QF_{23}	—	August 20, 2006	Palomar	NEAT	·	4.3 km	MPC · JPL
207585 Lubar	2006 QA_{24}	Lubar	August 17, 2006	Andrushivka	Andrushivka	ERI	3.2 km	MPC · JPL
207586	2006 QA_{27}	—	August 19, 2006	Kitt Peak	Spacewatch	·	4.3 km	MPC · JPL
207587	2006 QR_{38}	—	August 18, 2006	Anderson Mesa	LONEOS	·	3.7 km	MPC · JPL
207588	2006 QD_{52}	—	August 23, 2006	Palomar	NEAT	·	2.4 km	MPC · JPL
207589	2006 QQ_{54}	—	August 17, 2006	Palomar	NEAT	(31811)	4.6 km	MPC · JPL
207590	2006 QC_{56}	—	August 19, 2006	Kitt Peak	Spacewatch	EOS	2.5 km	MPC · JPL
207591	2006 QH_{56}	—	August 19, 2006	Kitt Peak	Spacewatch	T_{j} (2.99) · 3:2 · SHU	10 km	MPC · JPL
207592	2006 QT_{57}	—	August 24, 2006	Socorro	LINEAR	·	5.5 km	MPC · JPL
207593	2006 QG_{59}	—	August 19, 2006	Anderson Mesa	LONEOS	·	4.2 km	MPC · JPL
207594	2006 QX_{76}	—	August 21, 2006	Palomar	NEAT	EOS	3.4 km	MPC · JPL
207595	2006 QL_{79}	—	August 24, 2006	Eskridge	Farpoint	KOR	1.9 km	MPC · JPL
207596	2006 QZ_{81}	—	August 24, 2006	Palomar	NEAT	·	3.5 km	MPC · JPL
207597	2006 QU_{82}	—	August 27, 2006	Kitt Peak	Spacewatch	·	2.9 km	MPC · JPL
207598	2006 QQ_{88}	—	August 27, 2006	Kitt Peak	Spacewatch	·	4.2 km	MPC · JPL
207599	2006 QF_{91}	—	August 16, 2006	Palomar	NEAT	·	4.0 km	MPC · JPL
207600	2006 QG_{93}	—	August 16, 2006	Palomar	NEAT	GEF	2.0 km	MPC · JPL

== 207601–207700 ==
back to top

Designation			Discovery			Properties		Ref
Permanent	Provisional	Named after	Date	Site	Discoverer(s)	Category	Diam.	Ref
207601	2006 QQ_{99}	—	August 24, 2006	Palomar	NEAT	·	5.6 km	MPC · JPL
207602	2006 QU_{105}	—	August 28, 2006	Catalina	CSS	·	4.0 km	MPC · JPL
207603 Liuchaohan	2006 QD_{111}	Liuchaohan	August 27, 2006	Lulin	Lin, H.-C., Q. Ye	·	3.2 km	MPC · JPL
207604	2006 QW_{111}	—	August 22, 2006	Palomar	NEAT	·	3.7 km	MPC · JPL
207605	2006 QY_{113}	—	August 25, 2006	Socorro	LINEAR	T_{j} (2.98) · 3:2 · SHU	7.8 km	MPC · JPL
207606	2006 QK_{122}	—	August 29, 2006	Catalina	CSS	EOS	2.8 km	MPC · JPL
207607	2006 QG_{130}	—	August 19, 2006	Palomar	NEAT	·	4.5 km	MPC · JPL
207608	2006 QA_{140}	—	August 18, 2006	Palomar	NEAT	·	5.3 km	MPC · JPL
207609	2006 QA_{142}	—	August 18, 2006	Palomar	NEAT	·	5.2 km	MPC · JPL
207610	2006 QS_{155}	—	August 19, 2006	Kitt Peak	Spacewatch	·	2.0 km	MPC · JPL
207611	2006 QE_{157}	—	August 19, 2006	Kitt Peak	Spacewatch	slow	5.8 km	MPC · JPL
207612	2006 QQ_{162}	—	August 21, 2006	Kitt Peak	Spacewatch	·	3.6 km	MPC · JPL
207613	2006 RK_{9}	—	September 13, 2006	Palomar	NEAT	KOR	2.1 km	MPC · JPL
207614	2006 RU_{13}	—	September 14, 2006	Kitt Peak	Spacewatch	·	3.2 km	MPC · JPL
207615	2006 RK_{15}	—	September 14, 2006	Palomar	NEAT	EOS	3.4 km	MPC · JPL
207616	2006 RX_{33}	—	September 12, 2006	Catalina	CSS	·	3.4 km	MPC · JPL
207617	2006 RJ_{43}	—	September 14, 2006	Kitt Peak	Spacewatch	HYG	4.1 km	MPC · JPL
207618	2006 RF_{45}	—	September 14, 2006	Kitt Peak	Spacewatch	·	2.5 km	MPC · JPL
207619	2006 RU_{60}	—	September 14, 2006	Palomar	NEAT	HYG	4.3 km	MPC · JPL
207620	2006 RK_{74}	—	September 15, 2006	Kitt Peak	Spacewatch	·	2.2 km	MPC · JPL
207621	2006 RK_{81}	—	September 15, 2006	Kitt Peak	Spacewatch	THM	3.5 km	MPC · JPL
207622	2006 RT_{121}	—	September 15, 2006	Kitt Peak	Spacewatch	·	3.2 km	MPC · JPL
207623	2006 SK_{5}	—	September 16, 2006	Palomar	NEAT	3:2 · SHU	8.5 km	MPC · JPL
207624	2006 SY_{14}	—	September 17, 2006	Catalina	CSS	HYG	4.0 km	MPC · JPL
207625	2006 SB_{45}	—	September 18, 2006	Kitt Peak	Spacewatch	·	4.0 km	MPC · JPL
207626	2006 SP_{56}	—	September 20, 2006	Catalina	CSS	·	5.4 km	MPC · JPL
207627	2006 SA_{93}	—	September 18, 2006	Kitt Peak	Spacewatch	THM	2.8 km	MPC · JPL
207628	2006 SK_{111}	—	September 22, 2006	Socorro	LINEAR	·	3.5 km	MPC · JPL
207629	2006 SS_{144}	—	September 19, 2006	Kitt Peak	Spacewatch	·	4.8 km	MPC · JPL
207630	2006 SV_{167}	—	September 25, 2006	Kitt Peak	Spacewatch	3:2	7.3 km	MPC · JPL
207631	2006 SP_{225}	—	September 26, 2006	Mount Lemmon	Mount Lemmon Survey	·	2.6 km	MPC · JPL
207632	2006 SE_{299}	—	September 26, 2006	Socorro	LINEAR	·	4.1 km	MPC · JPL
207633	2006 SV_{339}	—	September 28, 2006	Kitt Peak	Spacewatch	·	1.7 km	MPC · JPL
207634	2006 SN_{350}	—	September 30, 2006	Catalina	CSS	·	5.1 km	MPC · JPL
207635	2006 SS_{390}	—	September 16, 2006	Kitt Peak	Spacewatch	·	3.1 km	MPC · JPL
207636	2006 SQ_{394}	—	September 26, 2006	Catalina	CSS	CYB	5.0 km	MPC · JPL
207637	2006 TE_{24}	—	October 12, 2006	Kitt Peak	Spacewatch	·	3.0 km	MPC · JPL
207638	2006 TJ_{32}	—	October 12, 2006	Kitt Peak	Spacewatch	3:2	7.3 km	MPC · JPL
207639	2006 TN_{123}	—	October 2, 2006	Kitt Peak	Spacewatch	·	5.5 km	MPC · JPL
207640	2006 UV_{22}	—	October 16, 2006	Mount Lemmon	Mount Lemmon Survey	·	4.0 km	MPC · JPL
207641	2006 UK_{46}	—	October 16, 2006	Kitt Peak	Spacewatch	3:2	7.7 km	MPC · JPL
207642	2006 UC_{180}	—	October 16, 2006	Catalina	CSS	·	6.1 km	MPC · JPL
207643	2006 UW_{181}	—	October 16, 2006	Catalina	CSS	·	5.5 km	MPC · JPL
207644	2006 UW_{322}	—	October 17, 2006	Kitt Peak	Spacewatch	3:2	7.5 km	MPC · JPL
207645	2007 HB_{33}	—	April 19, 2007	Mount Lemmon	Mount Lemmon Survey	·	850 m	MPC · JPL
207646	2007 HJ_{50}	—	April 20, 2007	Kitt Peak	Spacewatch	·	1.6 km	MPC · JPL
207647	2007 KQ_{8}	—	May 22, 2007	Siding Spring	SSS	·	3.2 km	MPC · JPL
207648	2007 LP_{18}	—	June 14, 2007	Anderson Mesa	LONEOS	·	2.1 km	MPC · JPL
207649	2007 MX_{5}	—	June 17, 2007	Kitt Peak	Spacewatch	·	830 m	MPC · JPL
207650	2007 MM_{8}	—	June 18, 2007	Kitt Peak	Spacewatch	·	1.8 km	MPC · JPL
207651	2007 MV_{13}	—	June 19, 2007	Kitt Peak	Spacewatch	·	1.7 km	MPC · JPL
207652	2007 OQ_{3}	—	July 18, 2007	Dauban	Chante-Perdrix	·	2.9 km	MPC · JPL
207653 Anatolymokrenko	2007 OS_{3}	Anatolymokrenko	July 18, 2007	Andrushivka	Andrushivka	T_{j} (2.98)	4.5 km	MPC · JPL
207654	2007 OF_{7}	—	July 24, 2007	Reedy Creek	J. Broughton	MAS	1.2 km	MPC · JPL
207655 Kerboguan	2007 OE_{8}	Kerboguan	July 25, 2007	Lulin	Lin, C.-S., Q. Ye	·	1.1 km	MPC · JPL
207656	2007 OG_{10}	—	July 25, 2007	Lulin	LUSS	·	3.6 km	MPC · JPL
207657 Mangiantini	2007 PA	Mangiantini	August 1, 2007	San Marcello	L. Tesi, Fagioli, G.	NYS	1.7 km	MPC · JPL
207658	2007 PY	—	August 4, 2007	Reedy Creek	J. Broughton	MAS	1.2 km	MPC · JPL
207659	2007 PV_{1}	—	August 6, 2007	Reedy Creek	J. Broughton	·	2.8 km	MPC · JPL
207660	2007 PA_{2}	—	August 7, 2007	Eskridge	Farpoint	·	2.8 km	MPC · JPL
207661 Hehuanshan	2007 PR_{5}	Hehuanshan	August 6, 2007	Lulin	Lin, C.-S., Q. Ye	·	3.4 km	MPC · JPL
207662	2007 PG_{7}	—	August 5, 2007	Socorro	LINEAR	NYS	1.6 km	MPC · JPL
207663	2007 PV_{7}	—	August 9, 2007	Reedy Creek	J. Broughton	·	1.9 km	MPC · JPL
207664	2007 PJ_{8}	—	August 10, 2007	Reedy Creek	J. Broughton	MAS	1.1 km	MPC · JPL
207665	2007 PK_{8}	—	August 10, 2007	Reedy Creek	J. Broughton	MAS	1.3 km	MPC · JPL
207666 Habibula	2007 PA_{11}	Habibula	August 11, 2007	Saint-Sulpice	B. Christophe	V	1.0 km	MPC · JPL
207667	2007 PW_{18}	—	August 9, 2007	Socorro	LINEAR	MAS	1.3 km	MPC · JPL
207668	2007 PX_{18}	—	August 9, 2007	Socorro	LINEAR	·	2.2 km	MPC · JPL
207669	2007 PF_{20}	—	August 9, 2007	Socorro	LINEAR	·	1.7 km	MPC · JPL
207670	2007 PH_{20}	—	August 9, 2007	Socorro	LINEAR	·	920 m	MPC · JPL
207671	2007 PJ_{20}	—	August 9, 2007	Socorro	LINEAR	·	2.1 km	MPC · JPL
207672	2007 PD_{22}	—	August 10, 2007	Kitt Peak	Spacewatch	·	1.7 km	MPC · JPL
207673	2007 PQ_{26}	—	August 13, 2007	Socorro	LINEAR	·	5.8 km	MPC · JPL
207674	2007 PV_{29}	—	August 8, 2007	Socorro	LINEAR	·	2.0 km	MPC · JPL
207675	2007 PC_{33}	—	August 9, 2007	Socorro	LINEAR	MAS	1.1 km	MPC · JPL
207676	2007 PE_{33}	—	August 9, 2007	Socorro	LINEAR	NYS	2.0 km	MPC · JPL
207677	2007 PE_{37}	—	August 13, 2007	Socorro	LINEAR	·	1.0 km	MPC · JPL
207678	2007 PH_{42}	—	August 11, 2007	Anderson Mesa	LONEOS	·	1.5 km	MPC · JPL
207679	2007 PV_{42}	—	August 9, 2007	Socorro	LINEAR	·	1.2 km	MPC · JPL
207680	2007 PY_{46}	—	August 10, 2007	Kitt Peak	Spacewatch	KON	2.9 km	MPC · JPL
207681 Caiqiao	2007 QO	Caiqiao	August 16, 2007	XuYi	PMO NEO Survey Program	·	2.7 km	MPC · JPL
207682	2007 QX	—	August 17, 2007	Bisei SG Center	BATTeRS	V	1.2 km	MPC · JPL
207683	2007 QJ_{10}	—	August 23, 2007	Kitt Peak	Spacewatch	MRX	1.4 km	MPC · JPL
207684	2007 QP_{12}	—	August 16, 2007	Cerro Burek	Burek, Cerro	·	5.7 km	MPC · JPL
207685	2007 QX_{12}	—	August 23, 2007	Kitt Peak	Spacewatch	·	2.1 km	MPC · JPL
207686	2007 RX_{2}	—	September 3, 2007	Catalina	CSS	MAS	1.1 km	MPC · JPL
207687 Senckenberg	2007 RZ_{15}	Senckenberg	September 12, 2007	Taunus	E. Schwab, R. Kling	·	1.8 km	MPC · JPL
207688	2007 RQ_{16}	—	September 11, 2007	Goodricke-Pigott	R. A. Tucker	·	1.8 km	MPC · JPL
207689	2007 RR_{18}	—	September 12, 2007	Dauban	Chante-Perdrix	·	5.5 km	MPC · JPL
207690	2007 RE_{19}	—	September 14, 2007	Wrightwood	J. W. Young	KOR	1.7 km	MPC · JPL
207691	2007 RS_{23}	—	September 3, 2007	Catalina	CSS	V	950 m	MPC · JPL
207692	2007 RU_{27}	—	September 4, 2007	Catalina	CSS	·	1.4 km	MPC · JPL
207693	2007 RC_{34}	—	September 5, 2007	Anderson Mesa	LONEOS	·	4.1 km	MPC · JPL
207694	2007 RB_{38}	—	September 8, 2007	Anderson Mesa	LONEOS	·	3.3 km	MPC · JPL
207695 Olgakopyl	2007 RO_{39}	Olgakopyl	September 8, 2007	Andrushivka	Andrushivka	·	1.2 km	MPC · JPL
207696	2007 RO_{55}	—	September 9, 2007	Kitt Peak	Spacewatch	·	3.3 km	MPC · JPL
207697	2007 RF_{58}	—	September 9, 2007	Anderson Mesa	LONEOS	·	3.1 km	MPC · JPL
207698	2007 RG_{58}	—	September 9, 2007	Anderson Mesa	LONEOS	AEO	1.6 km	MPC · JPL
207699	2007 RB_{59}	—	September 10, 2007	Kitt Peak	Spacewatch	NYS	1.5 km	MPC · JPL
207700	2007 RJ_{70}	—	September 10, 2007	Kitt Peak	Spacewatch	·	4.4 km	MPC · JPL

== 207701–207800 ==
back to top

Designation			Discovery			Properties		Ref
Permanent	Provisional	Named after	Date	Site	Discoverer(s)	Category	Diam.	Ref
207701	2007 RL_{70}	—	September 10, 2007	Kitt Peak	Spacewatch	THM	2.8 km	MPC · JPL
207702	2007 RN_{71}	—	September 10, 2007	Kitt Peak	Spacewatch	NYS	1.9 km	MPC · JPL
207703	2007 RH_{76}	—	September 10, 2007	Mount Lemmon	Mount Lemmon Survey	·	1.8 km	MPC · JPL
207704	2007 RT_{83}	—	September 10, 2007	Mount Lemmon	Mount Lemmon Survey	·	1.1 km	MPC · JPL
207705	2007 RF_{84}	—	September 10, 2007	Catalina	CSS	·	1.5 km	MPC · JPL
207706	2007 RN_{87}	—	September 10, 2007	Mount Lemmon	Mount Lemmon Survey	·	2.0 km	MPC · JPL
207707	2007 RB_{92}	—	September 10, 2007	Kitt Peak	Spacewatch	·	2.1 km	MPC · JPL
207708	2007 RU_{94}	—	September 10, 2007	Kitt Peak	Spacewatch	·	2.4 km	MPC · JPL
207709	2007 RU_{98}	—	September 10, 2007	Kitt Peak	Spacewatch	·	1.6 km	MPC · JPL
207710	2007 RR_{102}	—	September 11, 2007	Mount Lemmon	Mount Lemmon Survey	·	860 m	MPC · JPL
207711	2007 RQ_{104}	—	September 11, 2007	Mount Lemmon	Mount Lemmon Survey	·	2.0 km	MPC · JPL
207712	2007 RA_{106}	—	September 11, 2007	Catalina	CSS	·	2.1 km	MPC · JPL
207713	2007 RN_{109}	—	September 11, 2007	Kitt Peak	Spacewatch	·	1.6 km	MPC · JPL
207714	2007 RN_{118}	—	September 11, 2007	Mount Lemmon	Mount Lemmon Survey	·	2.0 km	MPC · JPL
207715 Muqinshuijiao	2007 RC_{119}	Muqinshuijiao	September 11, 2007	XuYi	PMO NEO Survey Program	·	1.2 km	MPC · JPL
207716 Wangxichan	2007 RQ_{119}	Wangxichan	September 11, 2007	XuYi	PMO NEO Survey Program	MAS	1.0 km	MPC · JPL
207717 Sa'a	2007 RE_{120}	Sa'a	September 11, 2007	Lulin	Q. Ye, Lin, H.-C.	THM	3.2 km	MPC · JPL
207718	2007 RF_{122}	—	September 12, 2007	Catalina	CSS	·	3.3 km	MPC · JPL
207719	2007 RE_{132}	—	September 12, 2007	Mount Lemmon	Mount Lemmon Survey	EOS	2.7 km	MPC · JPL
207720	2007 RA_{138}	—	September 14, 2007	Anderson Mesa	LONEOS	·	1.9 km	MPC · JPL
207721	2007 RW_{141}	—	September 13, 2007	Socorro	LINEAR	AEO	1.7 km	MPC · JPL
207722	2007 RU_{144}	—	September 14, 2007	Socorro	LINEAR	·	2.4 km	MPC · JPL
207723 Jiansanjiang	2007 RC_{148}	Jiansanjiang	September 11, 2007	XuYi	PMO NEO Survey Program	·	1.5 km	MPC · JPL
207724	2007 RY_{149}	—	September 12, 2007	Lulin	LUSS	·	2.3 km	MPC · JPL
207725	2007 RR_{150}	—	September 8, 2007	Anderson Mesa	LONEOS	·	2.2 km	MPC · JPL
207726	2007 RW_{150}	—	September 9, 2007	Anderson Mesa	LONEOS	·	3.0 km	MPC · JPL
207727	2007 RW_{165}	—	September 10, 2007	Kitt Peak	Spacewatch	(5)	1.7 km	MPC · JPL
207728	2007 RE_{172}	—	September 10, 2007	Kitt Peak	Spacewatch	·	2.7 km	MPC · JPL
207729	2007 RR_{173}	—	September 10, 2007	Kitt Peak	Spacewatch	fast	2.0 km	MPC · JPL
207730	2007 RG_{174}	—	September 10, 2007	Kitt Peak	Spacewatch	EOS	2.7 km	MPC · JPL
207731	2007 RZ_{187}	—	September 14, 2007	Altschwendt	W. Ries	·	1.9 km	MPC · JPL
207732	2007 RH_{191}	—	September 11, 2007	Kitt Peak	Spacewatch	·	1.7 km	MPC · JPL
207733	2007 RJ_{192}	—	September 12, 2007	Catalina	CSS	·	950 m	MPC · JPL
207734	2007 RK_{192}	—	September 12, 2007	Catalina	CSS	MAS	1.2 km	MPC · JPL
207735	2007 RH_{193}	—	September 12, 2007	Kitt Peak	Spacewatch	·	1.8 km	MPC · JPL
207736	2007 RS_{218}	—	September 14, 2007	Mount Lemmon	Mount Lemmon Survey	·	1.4 km	MPC · JPL
207737	2007 RL_{219}	—	September 14, 2007	Mount Lemmon	Mount Lemmon Survey	(5)	1.6 km	MPC · JPL
207738	2007 RD_{226}	—	September 10, 2007	Kitt Peak	Spacewatch	·	880 m	MPC · JPL
207739	2007 RP_{236}	—	September 13, 2007	Mount Lemmon	Mount Lemmon Survey	·	2.6 km	MPC · JPL
207740	2007 RZ_{236}	—	September 14, 2007	Kitt Peak	Spacewatch	·	1.0 km	MPC · JPL
207741	2007 RO_{244}	—	September 11, 2007	Kitt Peak	Spacewatch	·	3.7 km	MPC · JPL
207742	2007 RP_{245}	—	September 11, 2007	Kitt Peak	Spacewatch	·	2.2 km	MPC · JPL
207743	2007 RK_{247}	—	September 13, 2007	Catalina	CSS	·	7.0 km	MPC · JPL
207744	2007 RY_{247}	—	September 13, 2007	Anderson Mesa	LONEOS	·	3.1 km	MPC · JPL
207745	2007 RP_{252}	—	September 13, 2007	Catalina	CSS	·	5.0 km	MPC · JPL
207746	2007 RC_{256}	—	September 14, 2007	Catalina	CSS	·	2.5 km	MPC · JPL
207747	2007 RL_{257}	—	September 14, 2007	Catalina	CSS	·	2.3 km	MPC · JPL
207748	2007 RM_{277}	—	September 5, 2007	Anderson Mesa	LONEOS	·	3.2 km	MPC · JPL
207749	2007 RC_{286}	—	September 2, 2007	Mount Lemmon	Mount Lemmon Survey	L4	21 km	MPC · JPL
207750	2007 RS_{288}	—	September 13, 2007	Catalina	CSS	BRA	2.5 km	MPC · JPL
207751	2007 RW_{294}	—	September 14, 2007	Mount Lemmon	Mount Lemmon Survey	KOR	1.4 km	MPC · JPL
207752	2007 RX_{297}	—	September 5, 2007	Catalina	CSS	·	1.4 km	MPC · JPL
207753	2007 SA_{1}	—	September 18, 2007	La Sagra	OAM	·	3.7 km	MPC · JPL
207754 Stathiskafalis	2007 ST_{4}	Stathiskafalis	September 21, 2007	Altschwendt	W. Ries	·	1.4 km	MPC · JPL
207755	2007 SR_{6}	—	September 17, 2007	XuYi	PMO NEO Survey Program	·	2.2 km	MPC · JPL
207756	2007 SX_{11}	—	September 20, 2007	Črni Vrh	B. Mikuž, H. Mikuž	·	4.0 km	MPC · JPL
207757	2007 SM_{15}	—	September 25, 2007	Mount Lemmon	Mount Lemmon Survey	·	4.5 km	MPC · JPL
207758	2007 SN_{19}	—	September 23, 2007	Bergisch Gladbach	W. Bickel	KOR	1.9 km	MPC · JPL
207759	2007 TZ_{2}	—	October 3, 2007	Tiki	Teamo, N., Pelle, J. C.	·	3.8 km	MPC · JPL
207760	2007 TE_{3}	—	October 5, 2007	Prairie Grass	Grass, Prairie	KOR	1.8 km	MPC · JPL
207761	2007 TJ_{4}	—	October 6, 2007	7300	W. K. Y. Yeung	·	2.1 km	MPC · JPL
207762	2007 TA_{13}	—	October 6, 2007	Socorro	LINEAR	·	4.2 km	MPC · JPL
207763 Oberursel	2007 TP_{23}	Oberursel	October 6, 2007	Taunus	R. Kling, Zimmer, U.	·	2.5 km	MPC · JPL
207764	2007 TC_{24}	—	October 10, 2007	La Sagra	OAM	·	4.1 km	MPC · JPL
207765	2007 TV_{32}	—	October 6, 2007	Kitt Peak	Spacewatch	AGN	2.0 km	MPC · JPL
207766	2007 TJ_{33}	—	October 6, 2007	Kitt Peak	Spacewatch	·	1.9 km	MPC · JPL
207767	2007 TN_{34}	—	October 6, 2007	Kitt Peak	Spacewatch	·	1.9 km	MPC · JPL
207768	2007 TD_{35}	—	October 6, 2007	Kitt Peak	Spacewatch	KOR ·	4.5 km	MPC · JPL
207769	2007 TR_{36}	—	October 4, 2007	Catalina	CSS	·	1.5 km	MPC · JPL
207770	2007 TA_{38}	—	October 4, 2007	Catalina	CSS	·	830 m	MPC · JPL
207771	2007 TB_{40}	—	October 6, 2007	Kitt Peak	Spacewatch	·	1.7 km	MPC · JPL
207772	2007 TG_{49}	—	October 4, 2007	Kitt Peak	Spacewatch	(159)	3.7 km	MPC · JPL
207773	2007 TV_{58}	—	October 5, 2007	Kitt Peak	Spacewatch	T_{j} (2.97) · 3:2	6.1 km	MPC · JPL
207774	2007 TY_{66}	—	October 12, 2007	Dauban	Chante-Perdrix	·	3.4 km	MPC · JPL
207775	2007 TZ_{70}	—	October 13, 2007	Goodricke-Pigott	R. A. Tucker	(5651)	5.0 km	MPC · JPL
207776	2007 TY_{73}	—	October 13, 2007	7300	W. K. Y. Yeung	KOR	2.1 km	MPC · JPL
207777	2007 TY_{76}	—	October 5, 2007	Kitt Peak	Spacewatch	KOR	2.0 km	MPC · JPL
207778	2007 TO_{78}	—	October 5, 2007	Kitt Peak	Spacewatch	HYG	4.9 km	MPC · JPL
207779	2007 TZ_{84}	—	October 8, 2007	Catalina	CSS	PHO	1.9 km	MPC · JPL
207780	2007 TO_{86}	—	October 8, 2007	Mount Lemmon	Mount Lemmon Survey	·	3.8 km	MPC · JPL
207781	2007 TC_{103}	—	October 8, 2007	Mount Lemmon	Mount Lemmon Survey	KOR	2.1 km	MPC · JPL
207782	2007 TT_{103}	—	October 8, 2007	Mount Lemmon	Mount Lemmon Survey	·	1.4 km	MPC · JPL
207783	2007 TA_{106}	—	October 11, 2007	Taunus	Taunus	·	4.8 km	MPC · JPL
207784	2007 TO_{117}	—	October 9, 2007	Kitt Peak	Spacewatch	·	4.1 km	MPC · JPL
207785	2007 TD_{130}	—	October 6, 2007	Kitt Peak	Spacewatch	·	4.0 km	MPC · JPL
207786	2007 TO_{130}	—	October 7, 2007	Kitt Peak	Spacewatch	EOS	2.8 km	MPC · JPL
207787	2007 TW_{130}	—	October 7, 2007	Catalina	CSS	·	1.2 km	MPC · JPL
207788	2007 TQ_{133}	—	October 7, 2007	Mount Lemmon	Mount Lemmon Survey	·	4.6 km	MPC · JPL
207789	2007 TA_{144}	—	October 6, 2007	Socorro	LINEAR	HYG	5.0 km	MPC · JPL
207790	2007 TF_{147}	—	October 7, 2007	Socorro	LINEAR	·	3.9 km	MPC · JPL
207791	2007 TQ_{150}	—	October 9, 2007	Socorro	LINEAR	·	3.1 km	MPC · JPL
207792	2007 TO_{159}	—	October 9, 2007	Socorro	LINEAR	·	2.8 km	MPC · JPL
207793	2007 TN_{163}	—	October 11, 2007	Socorro	LINEAR	·	2.9 km	MPC · JPL
207794	2007 TM_{167}	—	October 12, 2007	Socorro	LINEAR	·	2.3 km	MPC · JPL
207795	2007 TR_{167}	—	October 12, 2007	Socorro	LINEAR	·	3.2 km	MPC · JPL
207796	2007 TB_{171}	—	October 12, 2007	Dauban	Chante-Perdrix	·	2.4 km	MPC · JPL
207797	2007 TO_{187}	—	October 13, 2007	Socorro	LINEAR	·	3.9 km	MPC · JPL
207798	2007 TR_{189}	—	October 4, 2007	Mount Lemmon	Mount Lemmon Survey	·	1.7 km	MPC · JPL
207799	2007 TA_{193}	—	October 6, 2007	Kitt Peak	Spacewatch	·	2.6 km	MPC · JPL
207800	2007 TW_{195}	—	October 7, 2007	Mount Lemmon	Mount Lemmon Survey	·	4.0 km	MPC · JPL

== 207801–207900 ==
back to top

Designation			Discovery			Properties		Ref
Permanent	Provisional	Named after	Date	Site	Discoverer(s)	Category	Diam.	Ref
207801	2007 TZ_{212}	—	October 7, 2007	Kitt Peak	Spacewatch	3:2	4.9 km	MPC · JPL
207802	2007 TS_{214}	—	October 7, 2007	Catalina	CSS	(1118)	7.1 km	MPC · JPL
207803	2007 TC_{215}	—	October 7, 2007	Kitt Peak	Spacewatch	·	1.1 km	MPC · JPL
207804	2007 TQ_{231}	—	October 8, 2007	Kitt Peak	Spacewatch	KOR	1.6 km	MPC · JPL
207805	2007 TM_{236}	—	October 9, 2007	Mount Lemmon	Mount Lemmon Survey	·	3.5 km	MPC · JPL
207806	2007 TX_{237}	—	October 10, 2007	Kitt Peak	Spacewatch	·	1.4 km	MPC · JPL
207807	2007 TT_{243}	—	October 8, 2007	Catalina	CSS	·	1.6 km	MPC · JPL
207808	2007 TP_{244}	—	October 8, 2007	Catalina	CSS	·	2.8 km	MPC · JPL
207809 Wuzuze	2007 TC_{247}	Wuzuze	October 9, 2007	XuYi	PMO NEO Survey Program	EOS	3.4 km	MPC · JPL
207810	2007 TK_{248}	—	October 10, 2007	Anderson Mesa	LONEOS	EOS	3.4 km	MPC · JPL
207811	2007 TV_{251}	—	October 12, 2007	Anderson Mesa	LONEOS	·	1.9 km	MPC · JPL
207812	2007 TH_{252}	—	October 7, 2007	Catalina	CSS	·	3.1 km	MPC · JPL
207813	2007 TR_{252}	—	October 7, 2007	Mount Lemmon	Mount Lemmon Survey	·	1.8 km	MPC · JPL
207814	2007 TW_{252}	—	October 8, 2007	Mount Lemmon	Mount Lemmon Survey	AST	2.9 km	MPC · JPL
207815	2007 TB_{256}	—	October 10, 2007	Kitt Peak	Spacewatch	·	2.4 km	MPC · JPL
207816	2007 TM_{257}	—	October 10, 2007	Kitt Peak	Spacewatch	KOR	1.5 km	MPC · JPL
207817	2007 TG_{261}	—	October 10, 2007	Kitt Peak	Spacewatch	·	1.7 km	MPC · JPL
207818	2007 TF_{269}	—	October 9, 2007	Kitt Peak	Spacewatch	·	3.4 km	MPC · JPL
207819	2007 TA_{289}	—	October 11, 2007	Catalina	CSS	·	2.3 km	MPC · JPL
207820	2007 TM_{317}	—	October 12, 2007	Kitt Peak	Spacewatch	MRX	1.6 km	MPC · JPL
207821	2007 TC_{333}	—	October 11, 2007	Kitt Peak	Spacewatch	·	1.7 km	MPC · JPL
207822	2007 TE_{336}	—	October 12, 2007	Kitt Peak	Spacewatch	(5)	1.6 km	MPC · JPL
207823	2007 TM_{341}	—	October 9, 2007	Mount Lemmon	Mount Lemmon Survey	KOR	1.6 km	MPC · JPL
207824	2007 TO_{353}	—	October 8, 2007	Mount Lemmon	Mount Lemmon Survey	·	2.3 km	MPC · JPL
207825	2007 TZ_{353}	—	October 10, 2007	Catalina	CSS	·	3.0 km	MPC · JPL
207826	2007 TM_{356}	—	October 12, 2007	Catalina	CSS	·	1.9 km	MPC · JPL
207827	2007 TD_{361}	—	October 14, 2007	Mount Lemmon	Mount Lemmon Survey	T_{j} (2.95)	5.6 km	MPC · JPL
207828	2007 TB_{376}	—	October 15, 2007	Goodricke-Pigott	R. A. Tucker	(5)	2.0 km	MPC · JPL
207829	2007 TU_{379}	—	October 14, 2007	Kitt Peak	Spacewatch	·	1.7 km	MPC · JPL
207830	2007 TM_{380}	—	October 14, 2007	Kitt Peak	Spacewatch	·	1.6 km	MPC · JPL
207831	2007 TR_{380}	—	October 14, 2007	Kitt Peak	Spacewatch	KOR	1.8 km	MPC · JPL
207832	2007 TR_{391}	—	October 15, 2007	Catalina	CSS	·	3.3 km	MPC · JPL
207833	2007 TL_{423}	—	October 4, 2007	Kitt Peak	Spacewatch	·	1.7 km	MPC · JPL
207834	2007 TG_{424}	—	October 7, 2007	Catalina	CSS	·	1.6 km	MPC · JPL
207835	2007 US_{7}	—	October 16, 2007	Catalina	CSS	·	6.2 km	MPC · JPL
207836	2007 UQ_{9}	—	October 17, 2007	Anderson Mesa	LONEOS	MRX	1.3 km	MPC · JPL
207837	2007 UE_{21}	—	October 16, 2007	Kitt Peak	Spacewatch	·	3.2 km	MPC · JPL
207838	2007 UZ_{36}	—	October 19, 2007	Catalina	CSS	·	1.4 km	MPC · JPL
207839	2007 UU_{42}	—	October 16, 2007	Siding Spring	SSS	EUP	5.8 km	MPC · JPL
207840	2007 UA_{55}	—	October 30, 2007	Kitt Peak	Spacewatch	·	4.0 km	MPC · JPL
207841	2007 UR_{55}	—	October 30, 2007	Kitt Peak	Spacewatch	·	6.1 km	MPC · JPL
207842	2007 UX_{78}	—	October 30, 2007	Mount Lemmon	Mount Lemmon Survey	·	2.3 km	MPC · JPL
207843	2007 UA_{82}	—	October 30, 2007	Kitt Peak	Spacewatch	·	1.9 km	MPC · JPL
207844	2007 UP_{88}	—	October 30, 2007	Mount Lemmon	Mount Lemmon Survey	THM	4.0 km	MPC · JPL
207845	2007 UZ_{101}	—	October 30, 2007	Kitt Peak	Spacewatch	AGN	1.4 km	MPC · JPL
207846	2007 UO_{108}	—	October 30, 2007	Kitt Peak	Spacewatch	·	2.2 km	MPC · JPL
207847	2007 UJ_{116}	—	October 31, 2007	Kitt Peak	Spacewatch	AGN	1.7 km	MPC · JPL
207848	2007 UV_{116}	—	October 30, 2007	Catalina	CSS	·	3.0 km	MPC · JPL
207849	2007 UY_{116}	—	October 30, 2007	Mount Lemmon	Mount Lemmon Survey	KOR	1.5 km	MPC · JPL
207850	2007 UA_{119}	—	October 30, 2007	Mount Lemmon	Mount Lemmon Survey	·	2.2 km	MPC · JPL
207851	2007 UN_{121}	—	October 30, 2007	Mount Lemmon	Mount Lemmon Survey	·	1.5 km	MPC · JPL
207852	2007 UU_{123}	—	October 31, 2007	Catalina	CSS	·	5.6 km	MPC · JPL
207853	2007 UP_{133}	—	October 30, 2007	Kitt Peak	Spacewatch	T_{j} (2.98) · 3:2	5.9 km	MPC · JPL
207854	2007 VS_{20}	—	November 2, 2007	Mount Lemmon	Mount Lemmon Survey	·	2.0 km	MPC · JPL
207855	2007 VN_{41}	—	November 3, 2007	Catalina	CSS	·	2.5 km	MPC · JPL
207856	2007 VM_{52}	—	November 1, 2007	Kitt Peak	Spacewatch	·	2.9 km	MPC · JPL
207857	2007 VR_{90}	—	November 5, 2007	Socorro	LINEAR	·	2.3 km	MPC · JPL
207858	2007 VZ_{104}	—	November 3, 2007	Kitt Peak	Spacewatch	·	2.6 km	MPC · JPL
207859	2007 VE_{109}	—	November 3, 2007	Kitt Peak	Spacewatch	THM	3.4 km	MPC · JPL
207860	2007 VV_{117}	—	November 4, 2007	Kitt Peak	Spacewatch	·	3.4 km	MPC · JPL
207861	2007 VW_{119}	—	November 5, 2007	Kitt Peak	Spacewatch	·	2.2 km	MPC · JPL
207862	2007 VM_{121}	—	November 5, 2007	Kitt Peak	Spacewatch	·	2.8 km	MPC · JPL
207863	2007 VJ_{127}	—	November 1, 2007	Mount Lemmon	Mount Lemmon Survey	·	1.7 km	MPC · JPL
207864	2007 VP_{133}	—	November 2, 2007	Kitt Peak	Spacewatch	THM	3.4 km	MPC · JPL
207865	2007 VY_{147}	—	November 4, 2007	Kitt Peak	Spacewatch	NYS	1.9 km	MPC · JPL
207866	2007 VO_{165}	—	November 5, 2007	Kitt Peak	Spacewatch	·	4.1 km	MPC · JPL
207867	2007 VF_{173}	—	November 2, 2007	Mount Lemmon	Mount Lemmon Survey	·	4.8 km	MPC · JPL
207868	2007 VH_{176}	—	November 4, 2007	Mount Lemmon	Mount Lemmon Survey	·	4.4 km	MPC · JPL
207869	2007 VY_{201}	—	November 5, 2007	Kitt Peak	Spacewatch	·	3.3 km	MPC · JPL
207870	2007 VG_{214}	—	November 9, 2007	Kitt Peak	Spacewatch	·	3.0 km	MPC · JPL
207871	2007 VQ_{216}	—	November 9, 2007	Kitt Peak	Spacewatch	·	2.4 km	MPC · JPL
207872	2007 VX_{243}	—	November 14, 2007	Bisei SG Center	BATTeRS	AGN	1.6 km	MPC · JPL
207873	2007 VX_{254}	—	November 15, 2007	Mount Lemmon	Mount Lemmon Survey	·	6.4 km	MPC · JPL
207874	2007 VQ_{274}	—	November 13, 2007	Anderson Mesa	LONEOS	·	5.8 km	MPC · JPL
207875	2007 VR_{297}	—	November 11, 2007	Catalina	CSS	·	2.3 km	MPC · JPL
207876	2007 VB_{299}	—	November 11, 2007	Catalina	CSS	ELF	4.5 km	MPC · JPL
207877	2007 VN_{300}	—	November 14, 2007	Eskridge	Farpoint	·	1.2 km	MPC · JPL
207878	2007 VS_{311}	—	November 14, 2007	Kitt Peak	Spacewatch	·	3.8 km	MPC · JPL
207879	2007 VW_{311}	—	November 5, 2007	Kitt Peak	Spacewatch	KOR	1.8 km	MPC · JPL
207880	2007 VC_{313}	—	November 5, 2007	Mount Lemmon	Mount Lemmon Survey	·	1.6 km	MPC · JPL
207881	2007 VM_{314}	—	November 2, 2007	Mount Lemmon	Mount Lemmon Survey	·	2.8 km	MPC · JPL
207882	2007 VF_{316}	—	November 3, 2007	Kitt Peak	Spacewatch	KOR	1.7 km	MPC · JPL
207883 Jeffreytonge	2007 WN	Jeffreytonge	November 16, 2007	La Cañada	Lacruz, J.	THM	2.9 km	MPC · JPL
207884	2007 WG_{51}	—	November 20, 2007	Mount Lemmon	Mount Lemmon Survey	KOR	1.9 km	MPC · JPL
207885	2007 WH_{51}	—	November 20, 2007	Mount Lemmon	Mount Lemmon Survey	·	2.4 km	MPC · JPL
207886	2007 XT_{9}	—	December 5, 2007	La Sagra	OAM	·	3.9 km	MPC · JPL
207887	2007 XU_{10}	—	December 4, 2007	Kanab	Sheridan, E. E.	AGN	1.7 km	MPC · JPL
207888	2007 YJ_{32}	—	December 28, 2007	Kitt Peak	Spacewatch	KOR	1.9 km	MPC · JPL
207889	2008 AZ_{6}	—	January 10, 2008	Mount Lemmon	Mount Lemmon Survey	·	3.5 km	MPC · JPL
207890	2008 CA_{126}	—	February 8, 2008	Mount Lemmon	Mount Lemmon Survey	·	7.6 km	MPC · JPL
207891	2008 RG_{25}	—	September 3, 2008	Kitt Peak	Spacewatch	MAS	970 m	MPC · JPL
207892	2008 SG_{182}	—	September 24, 2008	Kitt Peak	Spacewatch	L4	10 km	MPC · JPL
207893	2008 SK_{251}	—	September 24, 2008	Mount Lemmon	Mount Lemmon Survey	·	2.3 km	MPC · JPL
207894	2008 TA_{18}	—	October 1, 2008	Mount Lemmon	Mount Lemmon Survey	·	1.1 km	MPC · JPL
207895	2008 TJ_{51}	—	October 2, 2008	Kitt Peak	Spacewatch	·	2.3 km	MPC · JPL
207896	2008 TK_{113}	—	October 6, 2008	Kitt Peak	Spacewatch	·	1.9 km	MPC · JPL
207897	2008 TL_{113}	—	October 6, 2008	Kitt Peak	Spacewatch	·	2.4 km	MPC · JPL
207898	2008 UW_{1}	—	October 22, 2008	Socorro	LINEAR	·	3.6 km	MPC · JPL
207899 Grinmalia	2008 UC_{3}	Grinmalia	October 21, 2008	Andrushivka	Andrushivka	·	4.6 km	MPC · JPL
207900	2008 UQ_{71}	—	October 21, 2008	Mount Lemmon	Mount Lemmon Survey	·	3.0 km	MPC · JPL

== 207901–208000 ==
back to top

Designation			Discovery			Properties		Ref
Permanent	Provisional	Named after	Date	Site	Discoverer(s)	Category	Diam.	Ref
207901 Tzecmaun	2008 US_{91}	Tzecmaun	October 28, 2008	Tzec Maun	E. Schwab	EMA	5.1 km	MPC · JPL
207902	2008 UW_{112}	—	October 22, 2008	Kitt Peak	Spacewatch	·	1.3 km	MPC · JPL
207903	2008 UX_{163}	—	October 24, 2008	Kitt Peak	Spacewatch	·	2.2 km	MPC · JPL
207904	2008 UZ_{181}	—	October 24, 2008	Mount Lemmon	Mount Lemmon Survey	(5)	1.1 km	MPC · JPL
207905	2008 UD_{186}	—	October 24, 2008	Kitt Peak	Spacewatch	·	3.0 km	MPC · JPL
207906	2008 UQ_{201}	—	October 28, 2008	Socorro	LINEAR	EUN	2.7 km	MPC · JPL
207907	2008 UR_{257}	—	October 27, 2008	Kitt Peak	Spacewatch	·	3.9 km	MPC · JPL
207908	2008 UO_{263}	—	October 27, 2008	Kitt Peak	Spacewatch	NYS	1.5 km	MPC · JPL
207909	2008 UW_{276}	—	October 28, 2008	Mount Lemmon	Mount Lemmon Survey	THM	3.9 km	MPC · JPL
207910	2008 UA_{303}	—	October 29, 2008	Kitt Peak	Spacewatch	·	800 m	MPC · JPL
207911	2008 UE_{305}	—	October 29, 2008	Kitt Peak	Spacewatch	AGN	2.2 km	MPC · JPL
207912	2008 UH_{316}	—	October 30, 2008	Kitt Peak	Spacewatch	·	3.4 km	MPC · JPL
207913	2008 VN_{13}	—	November 7, 2008	Nogales	Tenagra II	·	3.7 km	MPC · JPL
207914	2008 VK_{18}	—	November 1, 2008	Kitt Peak	Spacewatch	·	2.2 km	MPC · JPL
207915	2008 VU_{38}	—	November 2, 2008	Catalina	CSS	·	3.1 km	MPC · JPL
207916	2008 VB_{51}	—	November 4, 2008	Kitt Peak	Spacewatch	KOR	1.8 km	MPC · JPL
207917	2008 VF_{59}	—	November 7, 2008	Mount Lemmon	Mount Lemmon Survey	·	2.1 km	MPC · JPL
207918	2008 VG_{62}	—	November 8, 2008	Kitt Peak	Spacewatch	·	2.3 km	MPC · JPL
207919	2008 VL_{66}	—	November 2, 2008	Catalina	CSS	·	2.1 km	MPC · JPL
207920	2008 WC_{2}	—	November 18, 2008	Socorro	LINEAR	·	2.3 km	MPC · JPL
207921	2008 WD_{12}	—	November 18, 2008	Catalina	CSS	·	3.3 km	MPC · JPL
207922	2008 WC_{15}	—	November 17, 2008	Kitt Peak	Spacewatch	(11882)	2.1 km	MPC · JPL
207923	2008 WS_{32}	—	November 18, 2008	Kitt Peak	Spacewatch	NYS	1.4 km	MPC · JPL
207924	2008 WA_{43}	—	November 17, 2008	Kitt Peak	Spacewatch	·	1.3 km	MPC · JPL
207925	2008 WY_{43}	—	November 17, 2008	Kitt Peak	Spacewatch	·	2.9 km	MPC · JPL
207926	2008 WS_{60}	—	November 19, 2008	Socorro	LINEAR	·	1.8 km	MPC · JPL
207927	2008 WE_{63}	—	November 20, 2008	Socorro	LINEAR	·	4.4 km	MPC · JPL
207928	2008 WV_{68}	—	November 18, 2008	Kitt Peak	Spacewatch	·	2.6 km	MPC · JPL
207929	2008 WB_{76}	—	November 20, 2008	Kitt Peak	Spacewatch	·	4.6 km	MPC · JPL
207930	2008 XD_{37}	—	December 2, 2008	Kitt Peak	Spacewatch	·	2.2 km	MPC · JPL
207931 Weihai	2008 YM_{9}	Weihai	December 24, 2008	Weihai	University, Shandong	fast	2.0 km	MPC · JPL
207932	2008 YW_{16}	—	December 21, 2008	Mount Lemmon	Mount Lemmon Survey	·	2.8 km	MPC · JPL
207933	2008 YF_{17}	—	December 21, 2008	Mount Lemmon	Mount Lemmon Survey	·	2.7 km	MPC · JPL
207934	2008 YQ_{17}	—	December 21, 2008	Mount Lemmon	Mount Lemmon Survey	AST	3.4 km	MPC · JPL
207935	2009 AF	—	January 1, 2009	Mayhill	Lowe, A.	·	2.1 km	MPC · JPL
207936	4511 P-L	—	September 24, 1960	Palomar	C. J. van Houten, I. van Houten-Groeneveld, T. Gehrels	·	840 m	MPC · JPL
207937	3367 T-2	—	September 25, 1973	Palomar	C. J. van Houten, I. van Houten-Groeneveld, T. Gehrels	·	5.4 km	MPC · JPL
207938	2108 T-3	—	October 16, 1977	Palomar	C. J. van Houten, I. van Houten-Groeneveld, T. Gehrels	·	800 m	MPC · JPL
207939	3205 T-3	—	October 16, 1977	Palomar	C. J. van Houten, I. van Houten-Groeneveld, T. Gehrels	·	3.3 km	MPC · JPL
207940	3518 T-3	—	October 16, 1977	Palomar	C. J. van Houten, I. van Houten-Groeneveld, T. Gehrels	·	1.7 km	MPC · JPL
207941	3827 T-3	—	October 16, 1977	Palomar	C. J. van Houten, I. van Houten-Groeneveld, T. Gehrels	MAS	940 m	MPC · JPL
207942	4291 T-3	—	October 16, 1977	Palomar	C. J. van Houten, I. van Houten-Groeneveld, T. Gehrels	slow	1.3 km	MPC · JPL
207943	1979 MN_{4}	—	June 25, 1979	Siding Spring	E. F. Helin, S. J. Bus	·	1.6 km	MPC · JPL
207944	1981 EG_{8}	—	March 1, 1981	Siding Spring	S. J. Bus	·	3.3 km	MPC · JPL
207945	1991 JW	—	May 8, 1991	Palomar	K. J. Lawrence, E. F. Helin	APO · PHA	420 m	MPC · JPL
207946	1991 TH_{16}	—	October 6, 1991	Palomar	Lowe, A.	·	1.9 km	MPC · JPL
207947	1991 TU_{16}	—	October 6, 1991	Palomar	Lowe, A.	·	2.5 km	MPC · JPL
207948	1993 FL_{12}	—	March 17, 1993	La Silla	UESAC	·	4.7 km	MPC · JPL
207949	1993 FX_{33}	—	March 19, 1993	La Silla	UESAC	·	3.7 km	MPC · JPL
207950	1993 TX_{9}	—	October 12, 1993	Kitt Peak	Spacewatch	AGN	1.4 km	MPC · JPL
207951	1994 AH_{7}	—	January 7, 1994	Kitt Peak	Spacewatch	·	2.2 km	MPC · JPL
207952	1994 GT_{4}	—	April 6, 1994	Kitt Peak	Spacewatch	EOS ·	6.1 km	MPC · JPL
207953	1994 PQ_{18}	—	August 12, 1994	La Silla	E. W. Elst	·	2.2 km	MPC · JPL
207954	1994 RU_{21}	—	September 5, 1994	La Silla	E. W. Elst	·	1.9 km	MPC · JPL
207955	1994 US_{6}	—	October 28, 1994	Kitt Peak	Spacewatch	·	2.0 km	MPC · JPL
207956	1995 DU_{8}	—	February 24, 1995	Kitt Peak	Spacewatch	DOR	3.2 km	MPC · JPL
207957	1995 FN_{7}	—	March 25, 1995	Kitt Peak	Spacewatch	(2076)	1.3 km	MPC · JPL
207958	1995 NA_{1}	—	July 1, 1995	Kitt Peak	Spacewatch	·	1.5 km	MPC · JPL
207959	1995 OR_{7}	—	July 24, 1995	Kitt Peak	Spacewatch	·	1.2 km	MPC · JPL
207960	1995 OZ_{9}	—	July 30, 1995	Kitt Peak	Spacewatch	EOS	2.9 km	MPC · JPL
207961	1995 OV_{17}	—	July 27, 1995	Kitt Peak	Spacewatch	·	3.0 km	MPC · JPL
207962	1995 SF_{19}	—	September 18, 1995	Kitt Peak	Spacewatch	·	3.3 km	MPC · JPL
207963	1995 SM_{20}	—	September 18, 1995	Kitt Peak	Spacewatch	·	5.0 km	MPC · JPL
207964	1995 SC_{79}	—	September 21, 1995	Kitt Peak	Spacewatch	·	3.9 km	MPC · JPL
207965	1995 UY_{21}	—	October 19, 1995	Kitt Peak	Spacewatch	MAS	1.1 km	MPC · JPL
207966	1995 UQ_{23}	—	October 19, 1995	Kitt Peak	Spacewatch	·	2.0 km	MPC · JPL
207967	1995 UZ_{23}	—	October 19, 1995	Kitt Peak	Spacewatch	·	930 m	MPC · JPL
207968	1995 VF_{14}	—	November 15, 1995	Kitt Peak	Spacewatch	·	1.2 km	MPC · JPL
207969	1996 AR_{5}	—	January 12, 1996	Kitt Peak	Spacewatch	·	1.7 km	MPC · JPL
207970	1996 BZ_{3}	—	January 29, 1996	Kitt Peak	Spacewatch	AMO +1km	830 m	MPC · JPL
207971	1996 JV_{8}	—	May 12, 1996	Kitt Peak	Spacewatch	·	2.2 km	MPC · JPL
207972	1996 JZ_{13}	—	May 11, 1996	Kitt Peak	Spacewatch	·	3.0 km	MPC · JPL
207973	1996 PT_{4}	—	August 14, 1996	Haleakala	NEAT	H	930 m	MPC · JPL
207974	1996 RM_{1}	—	September 8, 1996	Haleakala	NEAT	·	1.5 km	MPC · JPL
207975	1996 TY_{8}	—	October 12, 1996	Catalina Station	T. B. Spahr	·	4.0 km	MPC · JPL
207976	1996 TB_{36}	—	October 11, 1996	Kitt Peak	Spacewatch	·	1.7 km	MPC · JPL
207977	1996 TL_{36}	—	October 12, 1996	Kitt Peak	Spacewatch	·	1.1 km	MPC · JPL
207978	1996 VH_{15}	—	November 5, 1996	Kitt Peak	Spacewatch	·	2.0 km	MPC · JPL
207979	1996 VW_{22}	—	November 9, 1996	Kitt Peak	Spacewatch	·	3.2 km	MPC · JPL
207980	1996 VJ_{36}	—	November 10, 1996	Kitt Peak	Spacewatch	EMA	3.5 km	MPC · JPL
207981	1996 XO_{8}	—	December 6, 1996	Kitt Peak	Spacewatch	V	870 m	MPC · JPL
207982	1997 AY_{8}	—	January 2, 1997	Kitt Peak	Spacewatch	·	1.8 km	MPC · JPL
207983	1997 FT_{4}	—	March 30, 1997	Kitt Peak	Spacewatch	CYB	6.7 km	MPC · JPL
207984	1997 TG_{6}	—	October 2, 1997	Caussols	ODAS	·	2.9 km	MPC · JPL
207985	1997 WL_{11}	—	November 22, 1997	Kitt Peak	Spacewatch	·	850 m	MPC · JPL
207986	1997 WM_{17}	—	November 23, 1997	Kitt Peak	Spacewatch	·	760 m	MPC · JPL
207987	1997 WT_{25}	—	November 21, 1997	Kitt Peak	Spacewatch	·	1.1 km	MPC · JPL
207988	1998 DJ_{12}	—	February 23, 1998	Kitt Peak	Spacewatch	·	1.8 km	MPC · JPL
207989	1998 DH_{19}	—	February 24, 1998	Kitt Peak	Spacewatch	V	1.1 km	MPC · JPL
207990	1998 ES_{2}	—	March 2, 1998	Caussols	ODAS	PHO	1.1 km	MPC · JPL
207991	1998 EJ_{14}	—	March 1, 1998	La Silla	E. W. Elst	·	1.8 km	MPC · JPL
207992	1998 FC_{4}	—	March 20, 1998	Kitt Peak	Spacewatch	·	1.6 km	MPC · JPL
207993	1998 FJ_{48}	—	March 20, 1998	Socorro	LINEAR	TIR	3.2 km	MPC · JPL
207994	1998 FC_{50}	—	March 20, 1998	Socorro	LINEAR	V	1.0 km	MPC · JPL
207995	1998 FM_{127}	—	March 24, 1998	Socorro	LINEAR	·	1.7 km	MPC · JPL
207996	1998 GD_{10}	—	April 2, 1998	Socorro	LINEAR	·	4.3 km	MPC · JPL
207997	1998 HJ_{42}	—	April 24, 1998	Kitt Peak	Spacewatch	HYG	3.3 km	MPC · JPL
207998	1998 HH_{61}	—	April 21, 1998	Socorro	LINEAR	·	5.3 km	MPC · JPL
207999	1998 HK_{84}	—	April 21, 1998	Socorro	LINEAR	·	2.1 km	MPC · JPL
208000	1998 HQ_{136}	—	April 20, 1998	Socorro	LINEAR	·	2.7 km	MPC · JPL

back to top

== See also ==
- Meanings of minor-planet names: 207001–208000
