= Meanings of minor-planet names: 207001–208000 =

As minor planet discoveries are confirmed, they are given a permanent number by the IAU's Minor Planet Center (MPC), and the discoverers can then submit names for them, following the IAU's naming conventions. The list below concerns those minor planets in the specified number-range that have received names, and explains the meanings of those names.

Official naming citations of newly named small Solar System bodies are approved and published in a bulletin by IAU's Working Group for Small Bodies Nomenclature (WGSBN). Before May 2021, citations were published in MPC's Minor Planet Circulars for many decades. Recent citations can also be found on the JPL Small-Body Database (SBDB). Until his death in 2016, German astronomer Lutz D. Schmadel compiled these citations into the Dictionary of Minor Planet Names (DMP) and regularly updated the collection.

Based on Paul Herget's The Names of the Minor Planets, Schmadel also researched the unclear origin of numerous asteroids, most of which had been named prior to World War II. This article incorporates text from this source, which is in the public domain: SBDB New namings may only be added to this list below after official publication as the preannouncement of names is condemned. The WGSBN publishes a comprehensive guideline for the naming rules of non-cometary small Solar System bodies.

== 207001–207100 ==
Named minor planet	Provisional	This minor planet was named for...	Ref · Catalog
207013 Fischetti	2004 TC_{354}	Joel T. Fischetti (b. 1993), an American engineer at KinetX Aerospace.	IAU · 207013

== 207101–207200 ==
back to top

Named minor planet	Provisional	This minor planet was named for...	Ref · Catalog
207109 Stürmenchopf	2005 AA_{27}	The Stürmenchopf, a sugarloaf mountain located in the South of Laufon, Switzerland.	JPL · 207109

== 207201–207300 ==
back to top

Named minor planet	Provisional	This minor planet was named for...	Ref · Catalog
There are no named minor planets in this number range

== 207301–207400 ==
back to top

Named minor planet	Provisional	This minor planet was named for...	Ref · Catalog
207319 Eugenemar	2005 GZ_{109}	Eugene Y. Mar (born 1956), humanitarian, healer, and physician at Tucson Orthopedic Institute	JPL · 207319
207321 Crawshaw	2005 GL_{110}	Steven A. Crawshaw (born 1950), director of the Introductory Physics and Astronomy Labs at the University of Arkansas, United States	JPL · 207321
207341 Isabelmartin	2005 JD_{22}	Isabel Lacruz Martin (born 1956), doctorate graduated from Experimental Psychology at Kent State University in 2005	JPL · 207341
207385 Maxou	2005 RU_{4}	Max Aebischer (1914–2009), mayor of Fribourg, Switzerland, from 1960 to 1966, and director of the Education Department at the University of Fribourg. His nickname "Maxou" is a variation of "Max" in Alemannic German.	JPL · 207385
207394 Rickfitzgerald	2005 XL_{101}	Richard J. Fitzgerald (b. 1962), an American engineer.	IAU · 207394

== 207401–207500 ==
back to top

Named minor planet	Provisional	This minor planet was named for...	Ref · Catalog
207420 Jehin	2006 DR_{65}	Emmanuel Jehin (born 1973) is a Senior Research Associate at the Universite de Liège, Belgium. He is the principal investigator of the TRAPPIST telescopes and his research includes observations and characterization of comets, with a particular focus on production rate determination.	IAU · 207420
207481 Kékes	2006 HC_{31}	Kékes, the highest mountain peak in Hungary.	IAU · 207481

== 207501–207600 ==
back to top

Named minor planet	Provisional	This minor planet was named for...	Ref · Catalog
207504 Markusovszky	2006 HK_{152}	Lajos Markusovszky (1815–1893) was a physician, a military doctor, an organizers of modern Hungarian health education, and a member of the Hungarian Academy of Sciences. He was the founder of the Hungarian Medical Journal, and later an advisor to the Ministry for Religion and Education regarding university affairs.	JPL · 207504
207547 Charito	2006 LO	Rosario Lacruz Martín ("Charito"; born 1961), astronomer at Monte del Pardo, Madrid	JPL · 207547
207563 Toscana	2006 PC	The Italian region of Tuscany (Toscana), widely known for its landscapes, traditions, history and heritage	JPL · 207563
207585 Lubar	2006 QA_{24}	The ancient city of Bolokhov, capital of the Bolokhov principality in the times of Kievan Rus'. It is currently known as Lubar.	JPL · 207585

== 207601–207700 ==
back to top

Named minor planet	Provisional	This minor planet was named for...	Ref · Catalog
207603 Liuchaohan	2006 QD_{111}	Liu Chao-Han (born 1939), a Taiwanese physicist and educator who served as President of National Central University from 1990 to 2003.	JPL · 207603
207653 Anatolymokrenko	2007 OS_{3}	Anatoly Yuriyovych Mokrenko (1933–2020), a Ukrainian operatic baritone.	IAU · 207653
207655 Kerboguan	2007 OE_{8}	The National Museum of Natural Science (Kerboguan), a combined science center and natural history museum, is the first and the largest museum of natural science in Taiwan. It entertains more than three million visitors annually, and has become an important educational base for natural science since it opened in 1986.	JPL · 207655
207657 Mangiantini	2007 PA	Giovanni Mangiantini (1947–2006), Italian amateur astronomer	JPL · 207657
207661 Hehuanshan	2007 PR_{5}	Mount Hehuan is a 3416-m mountain in Central Taiwan. The peak lies on the boundaries of Nantou and Hualien counties and is within the Taroko Gorge National Park. The Taiwan Star Party is held in the Hehuan Mountains every year.	JPL · 207661
207666 Habibula	2007 PA_{11}	Giles Habibula, one of the main characters of the space opera Legion of Space	JPL · 207666
207681 Caiqiao	2007 QO	Cai Qiao (1897–1990), Chinese physiologist and member of the Chinese Academy of Sciences	JPL · 207681
207687 Senckenberg	2007 RZ_{15}	Johann Christian Senckenberg (1707–1772), a German physician and naturalist in his native city of Frankfurt	JPL · 207687
207695 Olgakopyl	2007 RO_{39}	Olga Andrivna Kopyl (born 1950), director of Zhytomyr Museum of Astronautics and a historian of cosmonautics in Russia and Ukraine	JPL · 207695

== 207701–207800 ==
back to top

Named minor planet	Provisional	This minor planet was named for...	Ref · Catalog
207715 Muqinshuijiao	2007 RC_{119}	Muqinshuijiao (Water cellar for Mothers) is a charity project implemented by the China Women's Development Foundation.	JPL · 207715
207716 Wangxichan	2007 RQ_{119}	Wang Xishan (1628–1682) was a Chinese astronomer of the late Ming and early Qing Dynasty, who developed a computational method to calculate accurately the times of transits of Venus and Mercury. He also published several astronomical works.	JPL · 207716
207717 Sa'a	2007 RE_{120}	Sanya City (local pronunciation Sa'a), founded in 110 B.C. as Ngaiziu. It is the southernmost city of China.	JPL · 207717
207723 Jiansanjiang	2007 RC_{148}	Jiansanjiang, located in the hinterland of Sanjiang Plain, is known as "China Green Rice City". Its Honghe farm is the first modernized farm in China.	JPL · 207723
207754 Stathiskafalis	2007 ST_{4}	Stathis Kafalis (born 1962) is a German engineer, amateur astronomer and telescope maker with Greek roots. He promotes astronomy via his mirror-grinding courses and he has helped many amateur astronomer to build their own telescope.	JPL · 207754
207763 Oberursel	2007 TP_{23}	The German town of Oberursel in Hesse	JPL · 207763

== 207801–207900 ==
back to top

Named minor planet	Provisional	This minor planet was named for...	Ref · Catalog
207809 Wuzuze	2007 TC_{247}	Wu Zuze (born 1935), an academician of the Chinese Academy of Sciences, is the founder of hematopoietic stem cell research and a pioneer of Experimental Hematology in China.	JPL · 207809
207883 Jeffreytonge	2007 WN	Jeffrey M. Tonge, American lawyer.	IAU · 207883
207899 Grinmalia	2008 UC_{3}	Eugene Grinishyn (born 1956), a stonemason, and Sergiy Malinovskiy (born 1964), a farmer, are neighbors of the Andrushivka Astronomical Observatory in Ukraine	JPL · 207899

== 207901–208000 ==
back to top

Named minor planet	Provisional	This minor planet was named for...	Ref · Catalog
207901 Tzecmaun	2008 US_{91}	The Tzec Maun Foundation, a foundation that provides free access to remote-controlled telescopes	JPL · 207901
207931 Weihai	2008 YM_{9}	The Chinese city of Weihai, a widely known harbor and tourist city, as well as the location of the Shandong University	JPL · 207931

back to top

Preceded by 206,001–207,000	Meanings of minor-planet names List of minor planets: 207,001–208,000	Succeeded by 208,001–209,000
