= List of minor planets: 210001–211000 =

The following is a partial list of minor planets, running from minor-planet number 210001 through 211000, inclusive. The primary data for this and other partial lists is based on JPL's "Small-Body Orbital Elements" and data available from the Minor Planet Center. Critical list information is also provided by the MPC, unless otherwise specified from Lowell Observatory. A detailed description of the table's columns and additional sources are given on the main page including a complete list of every page in this series, and a statistical break-up on the dynamical classification of minor planets.

Also see the summary list of all named bodies in numerical and alphabetical order, and the corresponding naming citations for the number range of this particular list. New namings may only be added to this list after official publication, as the preannouncement of names is condemned by the Working Group for Small Bodies Nomenclature of the International Astronomical Union.

Near-Earth obj.	MBA (inner)	MBA (outer)	Centaur
Mars-crosser	MBA (middle)	Jupiter trojan	Trans-Neptunian obj.
Unclassified

== 210001–210100 ==
Designation			Discovery			Properties		Ref
Permanent	Provisional	Named after	Date	Site	Discoverer(s)	Category	Diam.	Ref
210001	2006 JV_{27}	—	May 2, 2006	Mount Lemmon	Mount Lemmon Survey	·	2.0 km	MPC · JPL
210002	2006 JE_{29}	—	May 3, 2006	Kitt Peak	Spacewatch	·	1.8 km	MPC · JPL
210003	2006 JT_{42}	—	May 2, 2006	Kitt Peak	Spacewatch	·	2.2 km	MPC · JPL
210004	2006 JN_{43}	—	May 5, 2006	Kitt Peak	Spacewatch	V	900 m	MPC · JPL
210005	2006 JH_{44}	—	May 6, 2006	Kitt Peak	Spacewatch	·	970 m	MPC · JPL
210006	2006 JG_{51}	—	May 2, 2006	Mount Lemmon	Mount Lemmon Survey	·	1.1 km	MPC · JPL
210007	2006 JA_{53}	—	May 6, 2006	Kitt Peak	Spacewatch	·	1.1 km	MPC · JPL
210008	2006 JW_{53}	—	May 7, 2006	Mount Lemmon	Mount Lemmon Survey	MAS	860 m	MPC · JPL
210009	2006 JB_{58}	—	May 5, 2006	Mount Lemmon	Mount Lemmon Survey	V	800 m	MPC · JPL
210010	2006 KO	—	May 16, 2006	Palomar	NEAT	·	1.1 km	MPC · JPL
210011	2006 KT	—	May 18, 2006	Palomar	NEAT	MAS	1.0 km	MPC · JPL
210012	2006 KT_{1}	—	May 21, 2006	Catalina	CSS	AMO +1km	1.6 km	MPC · JPL
210013	2006 KF_{9}	—	May 19, 2006	Mount Lemmon	Mount Lemmon Survey	V	1.1 km	MPC · JPL
210014	2006 KO_{10}	—	May 19, 2006	Mount Lemmon	Mount Lemmon Survey	·	1.3 km	MPC · JPL
210015	2006 KS_{11}	—	May 19, 2006	Palomar	NEAT	·	1.2 km	MPC · JPL
210016	2006 KF_{22}	—	May 19, 2006	Mount Lemmon	Mount Lemmon Survey	·	1.7 km	MPC · JPL
210017	2006 KO_{32}	—	May 20, 2006	Kitt Peak	Spacewatch	MAS	900 m	MPC · JPL
210018	2006 KR_{38}	—	May 20, 2006	Anderson Mesa	LONEOS	·	1.0 km	MPC · JPL
210019	2006 KL_{41}	—	May 19, 2006	Mount Lemmon	Mount Lemmon Survey	·	2.6 km	MPC · JPL
210020	2006 KV_{42}	—	May 20, 2006	Kitt Peak	Spacewatch	·	2.5 km	MPC · JPL
210021	2006 KZ_{50}	—	May 21, 2006	Kitt Peak	Spacewatch	KOR	1.7 km	MPC · JPL
210022	2006 KD_{60}	—	May 22, 2006	Kitt Peak	Spacewatch	·	1.9 km	MPC · JPL
210023	2006 KZ_{64}	—	May 23, 2006	Catalina	CSS	·	1.5 km	MPC · JPL
210024	2006 KJ_{67}	—	May 24, 2006	Mount Lemmon	Mount Lemmon Survey	·	1.6 km	MPC · JPL
210025	2006 KP_{82}	—	May 25, 2006	Kitt Peak	Spacewatch	·	930 m	MPC · JPL
210026	2006 KH_{97}	—	May 25, 2006	Kitt Peak	Spacewatch	·	1.1 km	MPC · JPL
210027	2006 KY_{113}	—	May 22, 2006	Siding Spring	SSS	·	1.2 km	MPC · JPL
210028	2006 KP_{121}	—	May 27, 2006	Catalina	CSS	·	3.0 km	MPC · JPL
210029	2006 LD_{2}	—	June 5, 2006	Socorro	LINEAR	(5)	1.9 km	MPC · JPL
210030 Taoyuan	2006 MF_{13}	Taoyuan	June 24, 2006	Lulin	Yang, T.-C., Q. Ye	·	1.1 km	MPC · JPL
210031 Grupamocarta	2006 MP_{14}	Grupamocarta	June 30, 2006	Lulin	Q. Ye	·	1.6 km	MPC · JPL
210032 Enricocastellani	2006 OC	Enricocastellani	July 16, 2006	Vallemare Borbona	V. S. Casulli	·	2.2 km	MPC · JPL
210033	2006 OT_{1}	—	July 17, 2006	Reedy Creek	J. Broughton	·	2.0 km	MPC · JPL
210034	2006 OU_{3}	—	July 21, 2006	Mount Lemmon	Mount Lemmon Survey	·	1.6 km	MPC · JPL
210035 Jungli	2006 OG_{5}	Jungli	July 18, 2006	Lulin	Lin, H.-C., Q. Ye	·	2.2 km	MPC · JPL
210036	2006 OC_{8}	—	July 20, 2006	Palomar	NEAT	·	2.1 km	MPC · JPL
210037	2006 OY_{8}	—	July 20, 2006	Palomar	NEAT	NYS	1.4 km	MPC · JPL
210038	2006 OO_{9}	—	July 24, 2006	Hibiscus	S. F. Hönig	·	2.5 km	MPC · JPL
210039	2006 OG_{12}	—	July 21, 2006	Palomar	NEAT	(69559)	6.8 km	MPC · JPL
210040	2006 OC_{13}	—	July 21, 2006	Socorro	LINEAR	MAS	1.5 km	MPC · JPL
210041	2006 OP_{14}	—	July 20, 2006	Palomar	NEAT	·	3.8 km	MPC · JPL
210042	2006 OQ_{19}	—	July 20, 2006	Siding Spring	SSS	·	2.1 km	MPC · JPL
210043	2006 OV_{20}	—	July 22, 2006	Mount Lemmon	Mount Lemmon Survey	·	2.5 km	MPC · JPL
210044	2006 OH_{21}	—	July 21, 2006	Mount Lemmon	Mount Lemmon Survey	·	2.3 km	MPC · JPL
210045	2006 PL_{2}	—	August 12, 2006	Palomar	NEAT	·	1.3 km	MPC · JPL
210046	2006 PA_{6}	—	August 12, 2006	Palomar	NEAT	·	1.7 km	MPC · JPL
210047	2006 PE_{6}	—	August 12, 2006	Palomar	NEAT	EOS	3.0 km	MPC · JPL
210048	2006 PM_{11}	—	August 13, 2006	Palomar	NEAT	(5)	1.5 km	MPC · JPL
210049	2006 PN_{12}	—	August 13, 2006	Palomar	NEAT	3:2	5.9 km	MPC · JPL
210050	2006 PF_{16}	—	August 15, 2006	Palomar	NEAT	·	1.8 km	MPC · JPL
210051	2006 PT_{19}	—	August 13, 2006	Palomar	NEAT	·	2.5 km	MPC · JPL
210052	2006 PM_{20}	—	August 15, 2006	Palomar	NEAT	·	1.7 km	MPC · JPL
210053	2006 PG_{21}	—	August 15, 2006	Palomar	NEAT	·	2.8 km	MPC · JPL
210054	2006 PV_{21}	—	August 15, 2006	Palomar	NEAT	·	2.7 km	MPC · JPL
210055	2006 PO_{23}	—	August 12, 2006	Palomar	NEAT	·	1.7 km	MPC · JPL
210056	2006 PU_{23}	—	August 12, 2006	Palomar	NEAT	·	1.9 km	MPC · JPL
210057	2006 PT_{26}	—	August 15, 2006	Palomar	NEAT	·	3.1 km	MPC · JPL
210058	2006 PA_{27}	—	August 15, 2006	Palomar	NEAT	EUN	1.5 km	MPC · JPL
210059	2006 PW_{29}	—	August 12, 2006	Palomar	NEAT	·	3.1 km	MPC · JPL
210060	2006 PV_{37}	—	August 13, 2006	Palomar	NEAT	·	1.3 km	MPC · JPL
210061	2006 PJ_{39}	—	August 14, 2006	Palomar	NEAT	·	4.9 km	MPC · JPL
210062	2006 PD_{42}	—	August 14, 2006	Palomar	NEAT	·	5.2 km	MPC · JPL
210063	2006 PL_{43}	—	August 13, 2006	Palomar	NEAT	·	3.1 km	MPC · JPL
210064	2006 QW_{2}	—	August 17, 2006	Palomar	NEAT	·	3.0 km	MPC · JPL
210065	2006 QF_{3}	—	August 17, 2006	Palomar	NEAT	·	1.5 km	MPC · JPL
210066	2006 QK_{6}	—	August 17, 2006	Palomar	NEAT	·	5.0 km	MPC · JPL
210067	2006 QO_{6}	—	August 17, 2006	Palomar	NEAT	VER	4.8 km	MPC · JPL
210068	2006 QP_{7}	—	August 18, 2006	Kitt Peak	Spacewatch	EUN	2.0 km	MPC · JPL
210069	2006 QF_{9}	—	August 19, 2006	Kitt Peak	Spacewatch	·	2.5 km	MPC · JPL
210070 Robertcapa	2006 QK_{11}	Robertcapa	August 19, 2006	Piszkéstető	K. Sárneczky, Z. Kuli	·	2.8 km	MPC · JPL
210071	2006 QF_{12}	—	August 16, 2006	Siding Spring	SSS	·	2.2 km	MPC · JPL
210072	2006 QN_{15}	—	August 17, 2006	Palomar	NEAT	·	2.4 km	MPC · JPL
210073	2006 QZ_{18}	—	August 17, 2006	Palomar	NEAT	·	2.4 km	MPC · JPL
210074	2006 QZ_{21}	—	August 19, 2006	Anderson Mesa	LONEOS	·	3.2 km	MPC · JPL
210075	2006 QU_{22}	—	August 19, 2006	Palomar	NEAT	·	4.6 km	MPC · JPL
210076	2006 QU_{24}	—	August 17, 2006	Palomar	NEAT	·	5.1 km	MPC · JPL
210077	2006 QF_{25}	—	August 18, 2006	Anderson Mesa	LONEOS	·	3.6 km	MPC · JPL
210078	2006 QH_{26}	—	August 19, 2006	Kitt Peak	Spacewatch	·	2.7 km	MPC · JPL
210079	2006 QV_{27}	—	August 20, 2006	Palomar	NEAT	NYS	1.7 km	MPC · JPL
210080	2006 QU_{34}	—	August 17, 2006	Palomar	NEAT	·	2.9 km	MPC · JPL
210081	2006 QH_{36}	—	August 22, 2006	Palomar	NEAT	·	3.1 km	MPC · JPL
210082	2006 QB_{41}	—	August 17, 2006	Palomar	NEAT	PAD	2.4 km	MPC · JPL
210083	2006 QJ_{43}	—	August 18, 2006	Anderson Mesa	LONEOS	·	3.0 km	MPC · JPL
210084	2006 QD_{45}	—	August 19, 2006	Palomar	NEAT	·	5.0 km	MPC · JPL
210085	2006 QW_{45}	—	August 19, 2006	Kitt Peak	Spacewatch	slow	5.6 km	MPC · JPL
210086	2006 QA_{51}	—	August 23, 2006	Socorro	LINEAR	GEF	1.7 km	MPC · JPL
210087	2006 QD_{62}	—	August 22, 2006	Palomar	NEAT	3:2	6.0 km	MPC · JPL
210088	2006 QE_{65}	—	August 27, 2006	Kitt Peak	Spacewatch	KOR	1.6 km	MPC · JPL
210089	2006 QS_{68}	—	August 21, 2006	Kitt Peak	Spacewatch	MRX	1.5 km	MPC · JPL
210090	2006 QC_{76}	—	August 21, 2006	Kitt Peak	Spacewatch	·	1.7 km	MPC · JPL
210091	2006 QO_{81}	—	August 24, 2006	Palomar	NEAT	·	4.4 km	MPC · JPL
210092	2006 QU_{81}	—	August 24, 2006	Palomar	NEAT	AEO	1.7 km	MPC · JPL
210093	2006 QL_{82}	—	August 25, 2006	Socorro	LINEAR	·	2.3 km	MPC · JPL
210094	2006 QM_{82}	—	August 25, 2006	Socorro	LINEAR	·	4.1 km	MPC · JPL
210095	2006 QW_{87}	—	August 27, 2006	Kitt Peak	Spacewatch	EOS	2.4 km	MPC · JPL
210096	2006 QV_{94}	—	August 16, 2006	Palomar	NEAT	·	3.1 km	MPC · JPL
210097	2006 QA_{97}	—	August 18, 2006	Kitt Peak	Spacewatch	KOR	1.9 km	MPC · JPL
210098	2006 QM_{104}	—	August 28, 2006	Catalina	CSS	KOR	2.0 km	MPC · JPL
210099	2006 QK_{116}	—	August 27, 2006	Anderson Mesa	LONEOS	·	1.6 km	MPC · JPL
210100	2006 QM_{117}	—	August 27, 2006	Anderson Mesa	LONEOS	·	1.6 km	MPC · JPL

== 210101–210200 ==
back to top

Designation			Discovery			Properties		Ref
Permanent	Provisional	Named after	Date	Site	Discoverer(s)	Category	Diam.	Ref
210101	2006 QU_{117}	—	August 27, 2006	Anderson Mesa	LONEOS	EOS	2.2 km	MPC · JPL
210102	2006 QV_{117}	—	August 27, 2006	Anderson Mesa	LONEOS	·	5.9 km	MPC · JPL
210103	2006 QR_{120}	—	August 29, 2006	Catalina	CSS	·	4.2 km	MPC · JPL
210104	2006 QP_{123}	—	August 24, 2006	Palomar	NEAT	·	4.0 km	MPC · JPL
210105	2006 QW_{123}	—	August 29, 2006	Anderson Mesa	LONEOS	·	7.6 km	MPC · JPL
210106	2006 QV_{129}	—	August 19, 2006	Anderson Mesa	LONEOS	·	3.2 km	MPC · JPL
210107 Pistoletto	2006 QF_{137}	Pistoletto	August 30, 2006	Vallemare Borbona	V. S. Casulli	·	2.2 km	MPC · JPL
210108	2006 QO_{140}	—	August 18, 2006	Palomar	NEAT	·	4.6 km	MPC · JPL
210109	2006 QD_{154}	—	August 19, 2006	Kitt Peak	Spacewatch	·	3.2 km	MPC · JPL
210110	2006 QK_{161}	—	August 19, 2006	Kitt Peak	Spacewatch	AGN	1.7 km	MPC · JPL
210111	2006 QO_{165}	—	August 29, 2006	Catalina	CSS	EOS	3.0 km	MPC · JPL
210112	2006 QB_{168}	—	August 30, 2006	Anderson Mesa	LONEOS	HOF	4.0 km	MPC · JPL
210113	2006 QY_{169}	—	August 28, 2006	Anderson Mesa	LONEOS	·	6.0 km	MPC · JPL
210114	2006 RN_{1}	—	September 9, 2006	Palomar	NEAT	·	3.7 km	MPC · JPL
210115	2006 RB_{5}	—	September 14, 2006	Catalina	CSS	LIX	6.4 km	MPC · JPL
210116	2006 RQ_{10}	—	September 14, 2006	Palomar	NEAT	·	4.1 km	MPC · JPL
210117	2006 RO_{26}	—	September 14, 2006	Kitt Peak	Spacewatch	KOR	2.2 km	MPC · JPL
210118	2006 RG_{31}	—	September 15, 2006	Socorro	LINEAR	AEO	1.6 km	MPC · JPL
210119	2006 RM_{31}	—	September 15, 2006	Kitt Peak	Spacewatch	THM	4.3 km	MPC · JPL
210120	2006 RL_{37}	—	September 12, 2006	Catalina	CSS	·	4.4 km	MPC · JPL
210121	2006 RV_{39}	—	September 12, 2006	Catalina	CSS	·	1.6 km	MPC · JPL
210122	2006 RL_{40}	—	September 13, 2006	Palomar	NEAT	EOS	3.4 km	MPC · JPL
210123	2006 RN_{47}	—	September 14, 2006	Kitt Peak	Spacewatch	·	2.5 km	MPC · JPL
210124	2006 RW_{51}	—	September 14, 2006	Kitt Peak	Spacewatch	·	2.5 km	MPC · JPL
210125	2006 RR_{57}	—	September 15, 2006	Kitt Peak	Spacewatch	·	2.5 km	MPC · JPL
210126	2006 RE_{63}	—	September 14, 2006	Catalina	CSS	·	2.8 km	MPC · JPL
210127	2006 RB_{67}	—	September 15, 2006	Kitt Peak	Spacewatch	·	1.9 km	MPC · JPL
210128	2006 RC_{68}	—	September 15, 2006	Kitt Peak	Spacewatch	EOS	2.8 km	MPC · JPL
210129	2006 RD_{73}	—	September 15, 2006	Kitt Peak	Spacewatch	·	3.0 km	MPC · JPL
210130	2006 RP_{73}	—	September 15, 2006	Kitt Peak	Spacewatch	·	4.2 km	MPC · JPL
210131	2006 RS_{81}	—	September 15, 2006	Kitt Peak	Spacewatch	·	3.3 km	MPC · JPL
210132	2006 RP_{82}	—	September 15, 2006	Kitt Peak	Spacewatch	·	3.0 km	MPC · JPL
210133	2006 RK_{83}	—	September 15, 2006	Kitt Peak	Spacewatch	·	5.4 km	MPC · JPL
210134	2006 RW_{96}	—	September 15, 2006	Kitt Peak	Spacewatch	·	1.9 km	MPC · JPL
210135	2006 RZ_{104}	—	September 15, 2006	Kitt Peak	Spacewatch	KOR	1.7 km	MPC · JPL
210136	2006 ST	—	September 16, 2006	Goodricke-Pigott	R. A. Tucker	·	1.7 km	MPC · JPL
210137	2006 SK_{8}	—	September 16, 2006	Anderson Mesa	LONEOS	·	5.4 km	MPC · JPL
210138	2006 SW_{19}	—	September 18, 2006	7300	W. K. Y. Yeung	MRX	1.5 km	MPC · JPL
210139	2006 SY_{33}	—	September 17, 2006	Catalina	CSS	·	3.3 km	MPC · JPL
210140	2006 SK_{40}	—	September 18, 2006	Catalina	CSS	·	1.9 km	MPC · JPL
210141	2006 SN_{44}	—	September 17, 2006	Anderson Mesa	LONEOS	·	3.8 km	MPC · JPL
210142	2006 SY_{48}	—	September 18, 2006	Kitt Peak	Spacewatch	·	1.9 km	MPC · JPL
210143	2006 SG_{55}	—	September 18, 2006	Catalina	CSS	·	3.8 km	MPC · JPL
210144	2006 SZ_{56}	—	September 18, 2006	Calvin-Rehoboth	Calvin College	THM	4.8 km	MPC · JPL
210145	2006 SG_{57}	—	September 16, 2006	Catalina	CSS	·	4.2 km	MPC · JPL
210146	2006 SX_{59}	—	September 18, 2006	Catalina	CSS	EOS	2.9 km	MPC · JPL
210147 Žalgiris	2006 SU_{77}	Žalgiris	September 21, 2006	Moletai	K. Černis, Zdanavicius, J.	·	3.3 km	MPC · JPL
210148	2006 SW_{101}	—	September 19, 2006	Kitt Peak	Spacewatch	·	3.2 km	MPC · JPL
210149	2006 SQ_{107}	—	September 19, 2006	Catalina	CSS	HIL · 3:2	8.5 km	MPC · JPL
210150	2006 ST_{108}	—	September 19, 2006	Catalina	CSS	·	5.5 km	MPC · JPL
210151	2006 SX_{126}	—	September 22, 2006	Socorro	LINEAR	·	2.8 km	MPC · JPL
210152	2006 SD_{128}	—	September 17, 2006	Kitt Peak	Spacewatch	·	2.8 km	MPC · JPL
210153	2006 SO_{129}	—	September 19, 2006	Anderson Mesa	LONEOS	·	3.9 km	MPC · JPL
210154	2006 SC_{155}	—	September 22, 2006	Socorro	LINEAR	·	2.0 km	MPC · JPL
210155	2006 SG_{165}	—	September 25, 2006	Kitt Peak	Spacewatch	EUN	1.9 km	MPC · JPL
210156	2006 ST_{184}	—	September 25, 2006	Mount Lemmon	Mount Lemmon Survey	·	2.7 km	MPC · JPL
210157	2006 SP_{199}	—	September 24, 2006	Kitt Peak	Spacewatch	THM	3.9 km	MPC · JPL
210158	2006 SH_{205}	—	September 25, 2006	Mount Lemmon	Mount Lemmon Survey	·	2.9 km	MPC · JPL
210159	2006 SU_{219}	—	September 24, 2006	Kanab	Sheridan, E. E.	EOS ·	5.9 km	MPC · JPL
210160	2006 SR_{281}	—	September 18, 2006	Catalina	CSS	·	4.0 km	MPC · JPL
210161	2006 SG_{316}	—	September 27, 2006	Kitt Peak	Spacewatch	(1298)	6.3 km	MPC · JPL
210162	2006 SP_{319}	—	September 27, 2006	Kitt Peak	Spacewatch	·	1.5 km	MPC · JPL
210163	2006 SH_{320}	—	September 27, 2006	Kitt Peak	Spacewatch	KOR	2.1 km	MPC · JPL
210164	2006 SJ_{323}	—	September 27, 2006	Kitt Peak	Spacewatch	·	5.0 km	MPC · JPL
210165	2006 SE_{341}	—	September 28, 2006	Kitt Peak	Spacewatch	HOF	3.5 km	MPC · JPL
210166	2006 SX_{376}	—	September 17, 2006	Apache Point	A. C. Becker	·	2.4 km	MPC · JPL
210167	2006 SF_{383}	—	September 29, 2006	Apache Point	A. C. Becker	·	3.0 km	MPC · JPL
210168	2006 TM_{18}	—	October 11, 2006	Kitt Peak	Spacewatch	THM	3.7 km	MPC · JPL
210169	2006 TK_{19}	—	October 11, 2006	Kitt Peak	Spacewatch	·	5.3 km	MPC · JPL
210170	2006 TN_{20}	—	October 11, 2006	Kitt Peak	Spacewatch	·	5.1 km	MPC · JPL
210171	2006 TB_{40}	—	October 12, 2006	Kitt Peak	Spacewatch	VER	4.2 km	MPC · JPL
210172	2006 TD_{74}	—	October 11, 2006	Palomar	NEAT	·	4.2 km	MPC · JPL
210173	2006 TO_{82}	—	October 13, 2006	Kitt Peak	Spacewatch	·	2.6 km	MPC · JPL
210174 Vossenkuhl	2006 US	Vossenkuhl	October 16, 2006	Wildberg	R. Apitzsch	EUN	2.2 km	MPC · JPL
210175	2006 UL_{13}	—	October 17, 2006	Mount Lemmon	Mount Lemmon Survey	·	3.3 km	MPC · JPL
210176	2006 UM_{57}	—	October 18, 2006	Kitt Peak	Spacewatch	·	3.6 km	MPC · JPL
210177	2006 UL_{64}	—	October 19, 2006	Kitt Peak	Spacewatch	·	3.1 km	MPC · JPL
210178	2006 UH_{74}	—	October 17, 2006	Kitt Peak	Spacewatch	CYB	6.9 km	MPC · JPL
210179	2006 UH_{114}	—	October 19, 2006	Kitt Peak	Spacewatch	KOR	1.6 km	MPC · JPL
210180	2006 UL_{174}	—	October 19, 2006	Catalina	CSS	·	3.3 km	MPC · JPL
210181	2006 UB_{200}	—	October 21, 2006	Catalina	CSS	EOS	2.7 km	MPC · JPL
210182 Mazzini	2006 UE_{215}	Mazzini	October 26, 2006	Vallemare Borbona	V. S. Casulli	(1118)	6.9 km	MPC · JPL
210183	2006 UZ_{247}	—	October 27, 2006	Mount Lemmon	Mount Lemmon Survey	·	3.4 km	MPC · JPL
210184	2006 UD_{273}	—	October 27, 2006	Kitt Peak	Spacewatch	HIL · 3:2	7.4 km	MPC · JPL
210185	2006 UW_{332}	—	October 21, 2006	Apache Point	A. C. Becker	·	3.2 km	MPC · JPL
210186	2006 VC_{45}	—	November 12, 2006	Mount Lemmon	Mount Lemmon Survey	·	3.7 km	MPC · JPL
210187	2006 VZ_{64}	—	November 11, 2006	Kitt Peak	Spacewatch	3:2	7.7 km	MPC · JPL
210188	2006 VE_{137}	—	November 15, 2006	Kitt Peak	Spacewatch	THM	2.5 km	MPC · JPL
210189	2006 VS_{150}	—	November 9, 2006	Palomar	NEAT	CYB	5.2 km	MPC · JPL
210190	2006 WU_{69}	—	November 18, 2006	Kitt Peak	Spacewatch	HYG	3.8 km	MPC · JPL
210191	2007 OT_{6}	—	July 22, 2007	Siding Spring	SSS	T_{j} (2.93)	7.1 km	MPC · JPL
210192	2007 PW_{14}	—	August 8, 2007	Socorro	LINEAR	·	1.1 km	MPC · JPL
210193	2007 PX_{19}	—	August 9, 2007	Kitt Peak	Spacewatch	NYS	1.8 km	MPC · JPL
210194	2007 PM_{20}	—	August 9, 2007	Socorro	LINEAR	·	1.1 km	MPC · JPL
210195	2007 PP_{20}	—	August 9, 2007	Socorro	LINEAR	·	1.7 km	MPC · JPL
210196	2007 PV_{20}	—	August 9, 2007	Socorro	LINEAR	NYS ·	1.8 km	MPC · JPL
210197	2007 PJ_{22}	—	August 10, 2007	Kitt Peak	Spacewatch	H	680 m	MPC · JPL
210198	2007 PR_{24}	—	August 12, 2007	Socorro	LINEAR	·	1.2 km	MPC · JPL
210199	2007 PU_{24}	—	August 12, 2007	Socorro	LINEAR	NYS	2.0 km	MPC · JPL
210200	2007 PJ_{25}	—	August 11, 2007	Socorro	LINEAR	·	2.5 km	MPC · JPL

== 210201–210300 ==
back to top

Designation			Discovery			Properties		Ref
Permanent	Provisional	Named after	Date	Site	Discoverer(s)	Category	Diam.	Ref
210201	2007 PU_{28}	—	August 10, 2007	Kitt Peak	Spacewatch	KOR	1.8 km	MPC · JPL
210202	2007 PC_{29}	—	August 15, 2007	Hibiscus	S. F. Hönig, Teamo, N.	·	2.1 km	MPC · JPL
210203	2007 PP_{33}	—	August 11, 2007	Socorro	LINEAR	·	2.2 km	MPC · JPL
210204	2007 PQ_{33}	—	August 11, 2007	Socorro	LINEAR	·	2.6 km	MPC · JPL
210205	2007 PA_{37}	—	August 13, 2007	Socorro	LINEAR	·	1.9 km	MPC · JPL
210206	2007 PL_{39}	—	August 15, 2007	La Sagra	OAM	·	1.2 km	MPC · JPL
210207	2007 QV	—	August 17, 2007	Bisei SG Center	BATTeRS	·	940 m	MPC · JPL
210208	2007 QX_{7}	—	August 21, 2007	Anderson Mesa	LONEOS	NYS	1.3 km	MPC · JPL
210209	2007 QC_{8}	—	August 21, 2007	Anderson Mesa	LONEOS	MAS	1.6 km	MPC · JPL
210210 Songjian	2007 QS_{12}	Songjian	August 16, 2007	XuYi	PMO NEO Survey Program	·	700 m	MPC · JPL
210211	2007 QZ_{12}	—	August 24, 2007	Kitt Peak	Spacewatch	·	2.2 km	MPC · JPL
210212	2007 RP_{1}	—	September 4, 2007	Mayhill	Lowe, A.	·	890 m	MPC · JPL
210213 Hasler-Gloor	2007 RP_{14}	Hasler-Gloor	September 11, 2007	Winterthur	M. Griesser	·	1.8 km	MPC · JPL
210214	2007 RB_{27}	—	September 4, 2007	Catalina	CSS	·	2.2 km	MPC · JPL
210215	2007 RQ_{30}	—	September 5, 2007	Anderson Mesa	LONEOS	·	4.3 km	MPC · JPL
210216	2007 RA_{32}	—	September 5, 2007	Catalina	CSS	·	1.2 km	MPC · JPL
210217	2007 RZ_{32}	—	September 5, 2007	Catalina	CSS	·	1.9 km	MPC · JPL
210218	2007 RX_{37}	—	September 8, 2007	Anderson Mesa	LONEOS	·	2.0 km	MPC · JPL
210219	2007 RC_{47}	—	September 9, 2007	Mount Lemmon	Mount Lemmon Survey	·	880 m	MPC · JPL
210220	2007 RN_{54}	—	September 9, 2007	Kitt Peak	Spacewatch	·	1.9 km	MPC · JPL
210221	2007 RR_{60}	—	September 10, 2007	Catalina	CSS	·	940 m	MPC · JPL
210222	2007 RT_{89}	—	September 10, 2007	Mount Lemmon	Mount Lemmon Survey	·	2.3 km	MPC · JPL
210223	2007 RC_{92}	—	September 10, 2007	Kitt Peak	Spacewatch	·	960 m	MPC · JPL
210224	2007 RX_{93}	—	September 10, 2007	Kitt Peak	Spacewatch	·	930 m	MPC · JPL
210225	2007 RA_{97}	—	September 10, 2007	Mount Lemmon	Mount Lemmon Survey	·	1.4 km	MPC · JPL
210226	2007 RZ_{98}	—	September 10, 2007	Kitt Peak	Spacewatch	·	2.9 km	MPC · JPL
210227	2007 RJ_{103}	—	September 11, 2007	Catalina	CSS	·	1.6 km	MPC · JPL
210228	2007 RT_{111}	—	September 11, 2007	Kitt Peak	Spacewatch	(2076)	960 m	MPC · JPL
210229	2007 RA_{113}	—	September 11, 2007	Kitt Peak	Spacewatch	V	830 m	MPC · JPL
210230 Linyuanpei	2007 RF_{119}	Linyuanpei	September 11, 2007	XuYi	PMO NEO Survey Program	·	2.2 km	MPC · JPL
210231 Wangdemin	2007 RH_{119}	Wangdemin	September 11, 2007	XuYi	PMO NEO Survey Program	·	1.6 km	MPC · JPL
210232 Zhangjinqiu	2007 RV_{119}	Zhangjinqiu	September 11, 2007	XuYi	PMO NEO Survey Program	·	1.6 km	MPC · JPL
210233	2007 RV_{129}	—	September 12, 2007	Mount Lemmon	Mount Lemmon Survey	NYS	1.7 km	MPC · JPL
210234	2007 RW_{137}	—	September 14, 2007	Anderson Mesa	LONEOS	·	4.0 km	MPC · JPL
210235	2007 RC_{142}	—	September 13, 2007	Socorro	LINEAR	TIR	6.5 km	MPC · JPL
210236	2007 RN_{146}	—	September 15, 2007	Socorro	LINEAR	MAS	1.4 km	MPC · JPL
210237	2007 RQ_{154}	—	September 10, 2007	Catalina	CSS	L4	17 km	MPC · JPL
210238	2007 RX_{162}	—	September 10, 2007	Kitt Peak	Spacewatch	·	1.4 km	MPC · JPL
210239	2007 RQ_{173}	—	September 10, 2007	Kitt Peak	Spacewatch	·	2.6 km	MPC · JPL
210240	2007 RJ_{180}	—	September 11, 2007	Catalina	CSS	·	2.6 km	MPC · JPL
210241	2007 RM_{194}	—	September 12, 2007	Kitt Peak	Spacewatch	·	1.4 km	MPC · JPL
210242	2007 RD_{203}	—	September 13, 2007	Kitt Peak	Spacewatch	THM	2.2 km	MPC · JPL
210243	2007 RB_{205}	—	September 9, 2007	Kitt Peak	Spacewatch	·	970 m	MPC · JPL
210244	2007 RH_{209}	—	September 10, 2007	Kitt Peak	Spacewatch	·	2.8 km	MPC · JPL
210245 Castets	2007 RG_{216}	Castets	September 13, 2007	Pic du Midi	Pic du Midi	NYS	1.8 km	MPC · JPL
210246	2007 RC_{234}	—	September 12, 2007	Catalina	CSS	·	3.1 km	MPC · JPL
210247	2007 RJ_{234}	—	September 12, 2007	Catalina	CSS	·	2.0 km	MPC · JPL
210248	2007 RV_{235}	—	September 12, 2007	Anderson Mesa	LONEOS	NYS	1.5 km	MPC · JPL
210249	2007 RH_{241}	—	September 10, 2007	Catalina	CSS	MAR	1.7 km	MPC · JPL
210250	2007 RY_{242}	—	September 15, 2007	Socorro	LINEAR	MAS	1.1 km	MPC · JPL
210251	2007 RT_{243}	—	September 13, 2007	Catalina	CSS	HNS	1.9 km	MPC · JPL
210252	2007 RF_{257}	—	September 14, 2007	Kitt Peak	Spacewatch	·	2.4 km	MPC · JPL
210253	2007 RM_{270}	—	September 15, 2007	Mount Lemmon	Mount Lemmon Survey	AST	2.3 km	MPC · JPL
210254	2007 RG_{275}	—	September 13, 2007	Mount Lemmon	Mount Lemmon Survey	·	1.9 km	MPC · JPL
210255	2007 RY_{283}	—	September 9, 2007	Mount Lemmon	Mount Lemmon Survey	·	1.6 km	MPC · JPL
210256	2007 RO_{284}	—	September 11, 2007	Mount Lemmon	Mount Lemmon Survey	KOR	1.3 km	MPC · JPL
210257	2007 RK_{285}	—	September 13, 2007	Mount Lemmon	Mount Lemmon Survey	MAS	1.1 km	MPC · JPL
210258	2007 RW_{285}	—	September 14, 2007	Mount Lemmon	Mount Lemmon Survey	·	3.1 km	MPC · JPL
210259	2007 RO_{290}	—	September 10, 2007	Mount Lemmon	Mount Lemmon Survey	·	3.0 km	MPC · JPL
210260	2007 RE_{291}	—	September 14, 2007	Mount Lemmon	Mount Lemmon Survey	·	2.6 km	MPC · JPL
210261	2007 RM_{292}	—	September 12, 2007	Mount Lemmon	Mount Lemmon Survey	AST	1.8 km	MPC · JPL
210262	2007 RP_{295}	—	September 14, 2007	Mount Lemmon	Mount Lemmon Survey	NYS	1.4 km	MPC · JPL
210263	2007 RC_{303}	—	September 11, 2007	Kitt Peak	Spacewatch	HOF	4.1 km	MPC · JPL
210264	2007 SY_{2}	—	September 16, 2007	Socorro	LINEAR	NYS	1.8 km	MPC · JPL
210265	2007 SM_{5}	—	September 18, 2007	Socorro	LINEAR	·	2.9 km	MPC · JPL
210266	2007 SA_{6}	—	September 21, 2007	Socorro	LINEAR	·	1.0 km	MPC · JPL
210267	2007 SD_{17}	—	September 30, 2007	Kitt Peak	Spacewatch	·	950 m	MPC · JPL
210268	2007 ST_{18}	—	September 18, 2007	Anderson Mesa	LONEOS	V	920 m	MPC · JPL
210269	2007 SB_{19}	—	September 26, 2007	Mount Lemmon	Mount Lemmon Survey	·	2.6 km	MPC · JPL
210270	2007 TL_{2}	—	October 4, 2007	Kitt Peak	Spacewatch	·	2.2 km	MPC · JPL
210271 Samarkand	2007 TU_{2}	Samarkand	October 2, 2007	Maidanak	Khafizov, B., Sergeev, A.	·	1.4 km	MPC · JPL
210272	2007 TM_{7}	—	October 7, 2007	La Sagra	OAM	·	1.2 km	MPC · JPL
210273	2007 TD_{8}	—	October 7, 2007	Mayhill	Lowe, A.	·	1.2 km	MPC · JPL
210274	2007 TH_{9}	—	October 6, 2007	Socorro	LINEAR	·	1.3 km	MPC · JPL
210275	2007 TA_{12}	—	October 6, 2007	Socorro	LINEAR	·	4.0 km	MPC · JPL
210276	2007 TU_{12}	—	October 6, 2007	Socorro	LINEAR	·	1.5 km	MPC · JPL
210277	2007 TW_{13}	—	October 7, 2007	Socorro	LINEAR	V	900 m	MPC · JPL
210278	2007 TJ_{29}	—	October 4, 2007	Kitt Peak	Spacewatch	·	2.1 km	MPC · JPL
210279	2007 TS_{29}	—	October 4, 2007	Kitt Peak	Spacewatch	·	2.4 km	MPC · JPL
210280	2007 TS_{39}	—	October 6, 2007	Kitt Peak	Spacewatch	AST	2.9 km	MPC · JPL
210281	2007 TV_{43}	—	October 7, 2007	Mount Lemmon	Mount Lemmon Survey	·	2.8 km	MPC · JPL
210282	2007 TW_{43}	—	October 7, 2007	Mount Lemmon	Mount Lemmon Survey	NYS	2.0 km	MPC · JPL
210283	2007 TX_{43}	—	October 7, 2007	Mount Lemmon	Mount Lemmon Survey	THM	2.5 km	MPC · JPL
210284	2007 TZ_{50}	—	October 4, 2007	Kitt Peak	Spacewatch	·	1.9 km	MPC · JPL
210285	2007 TS_{52}	—	October 4, 2007	Kitt Peak	Spacewatch	·	1.7 km	MPC · JPL
210286	2007 TZ_{55}	—	October 4, 2007	Kitt Peak	Spacewatch	·	2.2 km	MPC · JPL
210287	2007 TM_{60}	—	October 6, 2007	Kitt Peak	Spacewatch	NYS	1.3 km	MPC · JPL
210288	2007 TN_{60}	—	October 6, 2007	Kitt Peak	Spacewatch	·	1.5 km	MPC · JPL
210289	2007 TT_{67}	—	October 8, 2007	Anderson Mesa	LONEOS	·	2.8 km	MPC · JPL
210290 Borsellino	2007 TE_{69}	Borsellino	October 13, 2007	Vallemare Borbona	V. S. Casulli	·	3.0 km	MPC · JPL
210291	2007 TE_{72}	—	October 14, 2007	Bergisch Gladbach	W. Bickel	KOR	1.8 km	MPC · JPL
210292 Mayongsheng	2007 TW_{79}	Mayongsheng	October 6, 2007	XuYi	PMO NEO Survey Program	GEF	2.3 km	MPC · JPL
210293	2007 TD_{80}	—	October 7, 2007	Catalina	CSS	·	1.7 km	MPC · JPL
210294 Vidal	2007 TT_{92}	Vidal	October 5, 2007	La Cañada	Lacruz, J.	·	2.7 km	MPC · JPL
210295	2007 TM_{94}	—	October 7, 2007	Catalina	CSS	·	3.6 km	MPC · JPL
210296	2007 TX_{94}	—	October 7, 2007	Catalina	CSS	·	2.5 km	MPC · JPL
210297	2007 TF_{97}	—	October 8, 2007	Mount Lemmon	Mount Lemmon Survey	·	920 m	MPC · JPL
210298	2007 TE_{105}	—	October 13, 2007	Calvin-Rehoboth	Calvin College	·	1.8 km	MPC · JPL
210299	2007 TE_{109}	—	October 7, 2007	Catalina	CSS	·	1.5 km	MPC · JPL
210300	2007 TP_{113}	—	October 8, 2007	Anderson Mesa	LONEOS	·	3.4 km	MPC · JPL

== 210301–210400 ==
back to top

Designation			Discovery			Properties		Ref
Permanent	Provisional	Named after	Date	Site	Discoverer(s)	Category	Diam.	Ref
210301	2007 TX_{123}	—	October 6, 2007	Kitt Peak	Spacewatch	·	2.4 km	MPC · JPL
210302	2007 TR_{126}	—	October 6, 2007	Kitt Peak	Spacewatch	·	2.4 km	MPC · JPL
210303	2007 TP_{141}	—	October 9, 2007	Mount Lemmon	Mount Lemmon Survey	·	1.6 km	MPC · JPL
210304	2007 TN_{143}	—	October 6, 2007	Socorro	LINEAR	·	1.9 km	MPC · JPL
210305	2007 TP_{146}	—	October 6, 2007	Socorro	LINEAR	·	1.7 km	MPC · JPL
210306	2007 TQ_{149}	—	October 8, 2007	Socorro	LINEAR	(58892)	5.5 km	MPC · JPL
210307	2007 TJ_{151}	—	October 9, 2007	Socorro	LINEAR	·	3.7 km	MPC · JPL
210308	2007 TX_{154}	—	October 9, 2007	Socorro	LINEAR	·	1.1 km	MPC · JPL
210309	2007 TZ_{155}	—	October 9, 2007	Socorro	LINEAR	·	2.9 km	MPC · JPL
210310	2007 TQ_{156}	—	October 9, 2007	Socorro	LINEAR	NYS ·	2.3 km	MPC · JPL
210311	2007 TS_{156}	—	October 9, 2007	Socorro	LINEAR	·	3.2 km	MPC · JPL
210312	2007 TQ_{160}	—	October 9, 2007	Socorro	LINEAR	·	2.7 km	MPC · JPL
210313	2007 TM_{165}	—	October 11, 2007	Socorro	LINEAR	·	1.4 km	MPC · JPL
210314	2007 TB_{167}	—	October 12, 2007	Socorro	LINEAR	·	1.8 km	MPC · JPL
210315	2007 TW_{190}	—	October 4, 2007	Mount Lemmon	Mount Lemmon Survey	·	1.5 km	MPC · JPL
210316	2007 TZ_{213}	—	October 7, 2007	Kitt Peak	Spacewatch	AGN	1.4 km	MPC · JPL
210317	2007 TM_{217}	—	October 7, 2007	Kitt Peak	Spacewatch	·	4.1 km	MPC · JPL
210318	2007 TS_{218}	—	October 7, 2007	Kitt Peak	Spacewatch	·	2.0 km	MPC · JPL
210319	2007 TG_{228}	—	October 8, 2007	Kitt Peak	Spacewatch	·	2.1 km	MPC · JPL
210320	2007 TM_{231}	—	October 8, 2007	Mount Lemmon	Mount Lemmon Survey	·	2.5 km	MPC · JPL
210321	2007 TG_{232}	—	October 8, 2007	Kitt Peak	Spacewatch	·	1.9 km	MPC · JPL
210322	2007 TR_{239}	—	October 10, 2007	Mount Lemmon	Mount Lemmon Survey	·	2.3 km	MPC · JPL
210323	2007 TW_{241}	—	October 7, 2007	Črni Vrh	Skvarč, J.	·	5.2 km	MPC · JPL
210324	2007 TH_{245}	—	October 8, 2007	Catalina	CSS	·	3.0 km	MPC · JPL
210325	2007 TD_{246}	—	October 9, 2007	Kitt Peak	Spacewatch	·	1.3 km	MPC · JPL
210326	2007 TJ_{255}	—	October 10, 2007	Kitt Peak	Spacewatch	PAD	4.2 km	MPC · JPL
210327	2007 TW_{260}	—	October 10, 2007	Kitt Peak	Spacewatch	·	1.2 km	MPC · JPL
210328	2007 TV_{278}	—	October 11, 2007	Mount Lemmon	Mount Lemmon Survey	·	2.0 km	MPC · JPL
210329	2007 TZ_{278}	—	October 11, 2007	Mount Lemmon	Mount Lemmon Survey	·	1.5 km	MPC · JPL
210330	2007 TG_{281}	—	October 7, 2007	Mount Lemmon	Mount Lemmon Survey	·	1.1 km	MPC · JPL
210331	2007 TE_{303}	—	October 12, 2007	Kitt Peak	Spacewatch	·	1.9 km	MPC · JPL
210332	2007 TP_{317}	—	October 12, 2007	Kitt Peak	Spacewatch	·	2.5 km	MPC · JPL
210333	2007 TC_{318}	—	October 12, 2007	Kitt Peak	Spacewatch	·	1.6 km	MPC · JPL
210334	2007 TH_{355}	—	October 11, 2007	Catalina	CSS	·	2.7 km	MPC · JPL
210335	2007 TT_{367}	—	October 10, 2007	Mount Lemmon	Mount Lemmon Survey	AGN	1.6 km	MPC · JPL
210336	2007 TT_{380}	—	October 14, 2007	Kitt Peak	Spacewatch	AGN	1.6 km	MPC · JPL
210337	2007 TY_{380}	—	October 14, 2007	Kitt Peak	Spacewatch	MAS	920 m	MPC · JPL
210338	2007 TQ_{381}	—	October 14, 2007	Kitt Peak	Spacewatch	·	2.4 km	MPC · JPL
210339	2007 TD_{382}	—	October 14, 2007	Kitt Peak	Spacewatch	BRG	2.4 km	MPC · JPL
210340	2007 TZ_{382}	—	October 14, 2007	Kitt Peak	Spacewatch	T_{j} (2.98) · 3:2	6.0 km	MPC · JPL
210341	2007 TB_{386}	—	October 15, 2007	Catalina	CSS	·	3.9 km	MPC · JPL
210342	2007 TS_{388}	—	October 13, 2007	Catalina	CSS	V	1.0 km	MPC · JPL
210343	2007 TX_{410}	—	October 15, 2007	Lulin	LUSS	·	1.6 km	MPC · JPL
210344	2007 TV_{428}	—	October 11, 2007	Kitt Peak	Spacewatch	MAS	930 m	MPC · JPL
210345 Barbon	2007 UQ	Barbon	October 16, 2007	Vallemare Borbona	V. S. Casulli	·	4.8 km	MPC · JPL
210346	2007 UM_{1}	—	October 16, 2007	Bisei SG Center	BATTeRS	·	2.4 km	MPC · JPL
210347	2007 UT_{1}	—	October 17, 2007	Junk Bond	D. Healy	V	1.1 km	MPC · JPL
210348	2007 UY_{3}	—	October 17, 2007	Bisei SG Center	BATTeRS	·	2.0 km	MPC · JPL
210349	2007 UJ_{4}	—	October 16, 2007	Bisei SG Center	BATTeRS	GEF	1.9 km	MPC · JPL
210350 Mariolisa	2007 UA_{7}	Mariolisa	October 22, 2007	Skylive	Tozzi, F.	·	2.7 km	MPC · JPL
210351	2007 UG_{10}	—	October 17, 2007	Anderson Mesa	LONEOS	·	1.5 km	MPC · JPL
210352	2007 UG_{11}	—	October 18, 2007	Socorro	LINEAR	·	4.3 km	MPC · JPL
210353	2007 US_{18}	—	October 18, 2007	Mount Lemmon	Mount Lemmon Survey	·	1.3 km	MPC · JPL
210354	2007 UV_{19}	—	October 18, 2007	Mount Lemmon	Mount Lemmon Survey	·	1.4 km	MPC · JPL
210355	2007 UF_{36}	—	October 19, 2007	Catalina	CSS	·	1.7 km	MPC · JPL
210356	2007 UP_{41}	—	October 16, 2007	Kitt Peak	Spacewatch	·	1.9 km	MPC · JPL
210357	2007 UE_{47}	—	October 21, 2007	Kitt Peak	Spacewatch	·	1.7 km	MPC · JPL
210358	2007 UN_{48}	—	October 20, 2007	Mount Lemmon	Mount Lemmon Survey	·	1.6 km	MPC · JPL
210359	2007 UO_{49}	—	October 24, 2007	Mount Lemmon	Mount Lemmon Survey	·	1.8 km	MPC · JPL
210360	2007 UR_{54}	—	October 30, 2007	Kitt Peak	Spacewatch	·	1.6 km	MPC · JPL
210361	2007 UB_{60}	—	October 30, 2007	Mount Lemmon	Mount Lemmon Survey	·	1.6 km	MPC · JPL
210362	2007 UF_{61}	—	October 30, 2007	Mount Lemmon	Mount Lemmon Survey	·	2.7 km	MPC · JPL
210363	2007 UA_{88}	—	October 30, 2007	Kitt Peak	Spacewatch	·	3.0 km	MPC · JPL
210364	2007 UX_{91}	—	October 30, 2007	Mount Lemmon	Mount Lemmon Survey	MRX	1.5 km	MPC · JPL
210365	2007 UZ_{98}	—	October 30, 2007	Kitt Peak	Spacewatch	AST	2.1 km	MPC · JPL
210366	2007 UU_{111}	—	October 30, 2007	Mount Lemmon	Mount Lemmon Survey	·	1.8 km	MPC · JPL
210367	2007 UM_{113}	—	October 31, 2007	Kitt Peak	Spacewatch	·	3.2 km	MPC · JPL
210368	2007 UZ_{115}	—	October 31, 2007	Kitt Peak	Spacewatch	EOS ·	5.8 km	MPC · JPL
210369	2007 UK_{128}	—	October 20, 2007	Mount Lemmon	Mount Lemmon Survey	MAS	880 m	MPC · JPL
210370	2007 VV_{11}	—	November 5, 2007	Kitt Peak	Spacewatch	·	2.1 km	MPC · JPL
210371	2007 VL_{25}	—	November 2, 2007	Catalina	CSS	EOS	2.9 km	MPC · JPL
210372	2007 VR_{34}	—	November 3, 2007	Kitt Peak	Spacewatch	KOR	1.9 km	MPC · JPL
210373	2007 VX_{38}	—	November 2, 2007	Catalina	CSS	·	1.1 km	MPC · JPL
210374	2007 VG_{39}	—	November 3, 2007	Kitt Peak	Spacewatch	·	2.6 km	MPC · JPL
210375	2007 VG_{58}	—	November 1, 2007	Kitt Peak	Spacewatch	·	2.0 km	MPC · JPL
210376	2007 VV_{62}	—	November 1, 2007	Kitt Peak	Spacewatch	V	1.0 km	MPC · JPL
210377	2007 VB_{63}	—	November 1, 2007	Kitt Peak	Spacewatch	·	2.7 km	MPC · JPL
210378	2007 VD_{63}	—	November 1, 2007	Kitt Peak	Spacewatch	·	2.3 km	MPC · JPL
210379	2007 VN_{80}	—	November 3, 2007	Kitt Peak	Spacewatch	·	3.8 km	MPC · JPL
210380	2007 VB_{85}	—	November 1, 2007	Socorro	LINEAR	TEL	2.0 km	MPC · JPL
210381	2007 VB_{87}	—	November 2, 2007	Socorro	LINEAR	·	2.4 km	MPC · JPL
210382	2007 VB_{88}	—	November 2, 2007	Socorro	LINEAR	(45637) · CYB	6.6 km	MPC · JPL
210383	2007 VF_{96}	—	November 9, 2007	Calvin-Rehoboth	L. A. Molnar	WIT	1.4 km	MPC · JPL
210384	2007 VL_{98}	—	November 2, 2007	Kitt Peak	Spacewatch	·	2.3 km	MPC · JPL
210385	2007 VE_{110}	—	November 3, 2007	Kitt Peak	Spacewatch	·	2.5 km	MPC · JPL
210386	2007 VW_{118}	—	November 4, 2007	Kitt Peak	Spacewatch	·	2.0 km	MPC · JPL
210387	2007 VQ_{129}	—	November 1, 2007	Mount Lemmon	Mount Lemmon Survey	MAS	910 m	MPC · JPL
210388	2007 VK_{130}	—	November 1, 2007	Mount Lemmon	Mount Lemmon Survey	·	2.2 km	MPC · JPL
210389	2007 VA_{149}	—	November 7, 2007	Kitt Peak	Spacewatch	·	830 m	MPC · JPL
210390	2007 VC_{149}	—	November 7, 2007	Kitt Peak	Spacewatch	·	3.7 km	MPC · JPL
210391	2007 VN_{164}	—	November 5, 2007	Kitt Peak	Spacewatch	(6769)	1.7 km	MPC · JPL
210392	2007 VU_{167}	—	November 5, 2007	Kitt Peak	Spacewatch	·	2.0 km	MPC · JPL
210393	2007 VN_{179}	—	November 7, 2007	Mount Lemmon	Mount Lemmon Survey	·	3.0 km	MPC · JPL
210394	2007 VQ_{180}	—	November 7, 2007	Catalina	CSS	HOF	4.3 km	MPC · JPL
210395	2007 VR_{185}	—	November 9, 2007	Kitt Peak	Spacewatch	·	1.8 km	MPC · JPL
210396	2007 VY_{196}	—	November 7, 2007	Mount Lemmon	Mount Lemmon Survey	·	1.3 km	MPC · JPL
210397	2007 VH_{224}	—	November 8, 2007	Kitt Peak	Spacewatch	·	4.1 km	MPC · JPL
210398	2007 VM_{238}	—	November 13, 2007	Kitt Peak	Spacewatch	·	2.6 km	MPC · JPL
210399	2007 VV_{240}	—	November 9, 2007	Catalina	CSS	·	6.5 km	MPC · JPL
210400	2007 VE_{245}	—	November 14, 2007	Bisei SG Center	BATTeRS	·	3.6 km	MPC · JPL

== 210401–210500 ==
back to top

Designation			Discovery			Properties		Ref
Permanent	Provisional	Named after	Date	Site	Discoverer(s)	Category	Diam.	Ref
210401	2007 VY_{253}	—	November 14, 2007	Mount Lemmon	Mount Lemmon Survey	·	950 m	MPC · JPL
210402	2007 VJ_{254}	—	November 15, 2007	Catalina	CSS	·	4.7 km	MPC · JPL
210403	2007 VW_{264}	—	November 13, 2007	Kitt Peak	Spacewatch	KOR	2.3 km	MPC · JPL
210404	2007 VO_{299}	—	November 12, 2007	Catalina	CSS	·	6.3 km	MPC · JPL
210405	2007 VG_{300}	—	November 13, 2007	Catalina	CSS	·	5.6 km	MPC · JPL
210406	2007 VG_{308}	—	November 5, 2007	Kitt Peak	Spacewatch	·	1.5 km	MPC · JPL
210407	2007 VS_{315}	—	November 8, 2007	Catalina	CSS	·	2.5 km	MPC · JPL
210408	2007 WF_{6}	—	November 17, 2007	Socorro	LINEAR	·	3.3 km	MPC · JPL
210409	2007 WD_{7}	—	November 18, 2007	Socorro	LINEAR	·	1.2 km	MPC · JPL
210410	2007 WX_{11}	—	November 18, 2007	Mount Lemmon	Mount Lemmon Survey	·	6.0 km	MPC · JPL
210411	2007 WN_{58}	—	November 17, 2007	Kitt Peak	Spacewatch	·	1.7 km	MPC · JPL
210412	2007 WD_{60}	—	November 21, 2007	Mount Lemmon	Mount Lemmon Survey	·	1.7 km	MPC · JPL
210413	2007 XL_{4}	—	December 3, 2007	Catalina	CSS	HOF	3.9 km	MPC · JPL
210414 Gebartolomei	2007 XT_{4}	Gebartolomei	December 3, 2007	San Marcello	L. Tesi, Fagioli, G.	·	1.1 km	MPC · JPL
210415	2007 XD_{6}	—	December 4, 2007	Catalina	CSS	·	2.5 km	MPC · JPL
210416	2007 XJ_{7}	—	December 4, 2007	Mount Lemmon	Mount Lemmon Survey	THM	2.7 km	MPC · JPL
210417	2007 XW_{10}	—	December 4, 2007	Mount Lemmon	Mount Lemmon Survey	THM	2.3 km	MPC · JPL
210418	2007 XZ_{12}	—	December 4, 2007	Kitt Peak	Spacewatch	·	1.5 km	MPC · JPL
210419	2007 XK_{41}	—	December 15, 2007	Socorro	LINEAR	·	2.7 km	MPC · JPL
210420	2007 XP_{44}	—	December 15, 2007	Kitt Peak	Spacewatch	·	2.7 km	MPC · JPL
210421 Freundtamás	2007 YD_{3}	Freundtamás	December 19, 2007	Piszkéstető	K. Sárneczky	·	2.1 km	MPC · JPL
210422	2007 YP_{15}	—	December 16, 2007	Kitt Peak	Spacewatch	(5)	1.8 km	MPC · JPL
210423	2007 YW_{51}	—	December 30, 2007	Kitt Peak	Spacewatch	·	4.4 km	MPC · JPL
210424	2008 AO_{7}	—	January 10, 2008	Kitt Peak	Spacewatch	·	3.9 km	MPC · JPL
210425 Imogene	2008 AM_{31}	Imogene	January 10, 2008	Calvin-Rehoboth	Calvin College	·	3.7 km	MPC · JPL
210426	2008 AV_{72}	—	January 7, 2008	Great Shefford	Birtwhistle, P.	KOR	1.9 km	MPC · JPL
210427	2008 EB_{93}	—	March 1, 2008	Mount Lemmon	Mount Lemmon Survey	·	3.2 km	MPC · JPL
210428	2008 SM_{168}	—	September 28, 2008	Socorro	LINEAR	·	3.6 km	MPC · JPL
210429	2008 UG_{230}	—	October 25, 2008	Kitt Peak	Spacewatch	·	3.1 km	MPC · JPL
210430	2008 WO_{79}	—	November 20, 2008	Kitt Peak	Spacewatch	AGN	1.6 km	MPC · JPL
210431	2008 WH_{82}	—	November 20, 2008	Kitt Peak	Spacewatch	VER	4.6 km	MPC · JPL
210432 Dietmarhopp	2008 XA_{7}	Dietmarhopp	December 8, 2008	Calar Alto	F. Hormuth	URS	3.5 km	MPC · JPL
210433 Ullithiele	2008 YT_{1}	Ullithiele	December 21, 2008	Calar Alto	F. Hormuth	KOR	1.5 km	MPC · JPL
210434 Fungyuancheng	2008 YH_{14}	Fungyuancheng	December 20, 2008	Lulin	Lin, H.-C., Q. Ye	·	4.5 km	MPC · JPL
210435 Pollackmihály	2008 YD_{26}	Pollackmihály	December 28, 2008	Piszkéstető	K. Sárneczky	·	6.0 km	MPC · JPL
210436	2008 YZ_{29}	—	December 29, 2008	Vicques	M. Ory	·	1.6 km	MPC · JPL
210437	2008 YR_{38}	—	December 29, 2008	Catalina	CSS	·	3.1 km	MPC · JPL
210438	2008 YW_{61}	—	December 30, 2008	Mount Lemmon	Mount Lemmon Survey	·	3.4 km	MPC · JPL
210439	2008 YO_{63}	—	December 30, 2008	Mount Lemmon	Mount Lemmon Survey	EUN	1.7 km	MPC · JPL
210440	2008 YD_{104}	—	December 29, 2008	Kitt Peak	Spacewatch	NYS	1.4 km	MPC · JPL
210441	2008 YW_{127}	—	December 30, 2008	Kitt Peak	Spacewatch	·	880 m	MPC · JPL
210442	2008 YL_{135}	—	December 30, 2008	La Sagra	OAM	·	2.8 km	MPC · JPL
210443	2009 BN	—	January 16, 2009	Dauban	Chante-Perdrix	·	1.7 km	MPC · JPL
210444 Frithjof	2009 BX	Frithjof	January 16, 2009	Calar Alto	F. Hormuth	·	1.2 km	MPC · JPL
210445	2009 BO_{1}	—	January 17, 2009	Mayhill	Lowe, A.	LEO	3.1 km	MPC · JPL
210446	2009 BH_{64}	—	January 20, 2009	Catalina	CSS	·	960 m	MPC · JPL
210447	2009 BE_{70}	—	January 25, 2009	Catalina	CSS	·	2.1 km	MPC · JPL
210448	2009 BW_{78}	—	January 30, 2009	Kachina	Kachina	·	1.5 km	MPC · JPL
210449	2136 P-L	—	September 24, 1960	Palomar	C. J. van Houten, I. van Houten-Groeneveld, T. Gehrels	(1547)	1.9 km	MPC · JPL
210450	2619 P-L	—	September 24, 1960	Palomar	C. J. van Houten, I. van Houten-Groeneveld, T. Gehrels	·	6.6 km	MPC · JPL
210451	2806 P-L	—	September 24, 1960	Palomar	C. J. van Houten, I. van Houten-Groeneveld, T. Gehrels	·	2.1 km	MPC · JPL
210452	2032 T-2	—	September 29, 1973	Palomar	C. J. van Houten, I. van Houten-Groeneveld, T. Gehrels	NYS	1.3 km	MPC · JPL
210453	2673 T-3	—	October 11, 1977	Palomar	C. J. van Houten, I. van Houten-Groeneveld, T. Gehrels	·	2.0 km	MPC · JPL
210454	4307 T-3	—	October 16, 1977	Palomar	C. J. van Houten, I. van Houten-Groeneveld, T. Gehrels	·	1.7 km	MPC · JPL
210455	1981 EY_{44}	—	March 7, 1981	Siding Spring	S. J. Bus	·	2.8 km	MPC · JPL
210456	1991 TQ_{9}	—	October 6, 1991	Kitt Peak	Spacewatch	·	3.1 km	MPC · JPL
210457	1993 FH_{9}	—	March 17, 1993	La Silla	UESAC	·	3.1 km	MPC · JPL
210458	1993 FV_{42}	—	March 19, 1993	La Silla	UESAC	·	4.2 km	MPC · JPL
210459	1993 TC_{26}	—	October 9, 1993	La Silla	E. W. Elst	NYS	1.5 km	MPC · JPL
210460	1994 AD_{9}	—	January 8, 1994	Kitt Peak	Spacewatch	·	1.7 km	MPC · JPL
210461	1994 CN_{7}	—	February 15, 1994	Kitt Peak	Spacewatch	·	2.4 km	MPC · JPL
210462	1994 SS_{6}	—	September 28, 1994	Kitt Peak	Spacewatch	·	3.4 km	MPC · JPL
210463	1994 SC_{10}	—	September 28, 1994	Kitt Peak	Spacewatch	·	4.3 km	MPC · JPL
210464	1994 VW_{7}	—	November 5, 1994	Kitt Peak	Spacewatch	·	3.6 km	MPC · JPL
210465	1994 XB_{2}	—	December 1, 1994	Kitt Peak	Spacewatch	·	2.0 km	MPC · JPL
210466	1995 FL_{5}	—	March 23, 1995	Kitt Peak	Spacewatch	·	2.4 km	MPC · JPL
210467	1995 HW_{3}	—	April 26, 1995	Kitt Peak	Spacewatch	·	1.3 km	MPC · JPL
210468	1995 SW_{8}	—	September 17, 1995	Kitt Peak	Spacewatch	·	1.8 km	MPC · JPL
210469	1995 SA_{9}	—	September 17, 1995	Kitt Peak	Spacewatch	·	2.8 km	MPC · JPL
210470	1995 SO_{18}	—	September 18, 1995	Kitt Peak	Spacewatch	(5)	1.2 km	MPC · JPL
210471	1995 SC_{19}	—	September 18, 1995	Kitt Peak	Spacewatch	MAS	930 m	MPC · JPL
210472	1995 SX_{24}	—	September 19, 1995	Kitt Peak	Spacewatch	·	3.2 km	MPC · JPL
210473	1995 SQ_{52}	—	September 29, 1995	Kitt Peak	Spacewatch	MAS	710 m	MPC · JPL
210474	1995 ST_{58}	—	September 24, 1995	Kitt Peak	Spacewatch	·	3.1 km	MPC · JPL
210475	1995 SC_{64}	—	September 26, 1995	Kitt Peak	Spacewatch	THM	2.4 km	MPC · JPL
210476	1995 UF_{1}	—	October 22, 1995	Kleť	Kleť	·	3.2 km	MPC · JPL
210477	1995 UD_{18}	—	October 18, 1995	Kitt Peak	Spacewatch	NYS	1.4 km	MPC · JPL
210478	1995 UN_{66}	—	October 17, 1995	Kitt Peak	Spacewatch	·	3.4 km	MPC · JPL
210479	1995 XE_{5}	—	December 14, 1995	Kitt Peak	Spacewatch	·	1.9 km	MPC · JPL
210480	1996 EH_{7}	—	March 11, 1996	Kitt Peak	Spacewatch	·	1.9 km	MPC · JPL
210481	1996 HQ_{1}	—	April 20, 1996	Haleakala	AMOS	H	940 m	MPC · JPL
210482	1996 RW_{1}	—	September 11, 1996	Haleakala	NEAT	·	1.2 km	MPC · JPL
210483	1996 RG_{7}	—	September 5, 1996	Kitt Peak	Spacewatch	·	1.2 km	MPC · JPL
210484	1996 RG_{19}	—	September 15, 1996	Kitt Peak	Spacewatch	KOR	1.6 km	MPC · JPL
210485	1996 TK	—	October 3, 1996	Prescott	P. G. Comba	MAS	940 m	MPC · JPL
210486	1996 TW_{18}	—	October 4, 1996	Kitt Peak	Spacewatch	·	1.2 km	MPC · JPL
210487	1996 VM_{9}	—	November 3, 1996	Kitt Peak	Spacewatch	·	3.1 km	MPC · JPL
210488	1996 XT_{10}	—	December 2, 1996	Kitt Peak	Spacewatch	·	1.8 km	MPC · JPL
210489	1997 AB_{22}	—	January 15, 1997	Chichibu	N. Satō	·	5.4 km	MPC · JPL
210490	1997 CN_{11}	—	February 3, 1997	Kitt Peak	Spacewatch	MAS	900 m	MPC · JPL
210491	1997 GP_{2}	—	April 7, 1997	Kitt Peak	Spacewatch	(5)	1.3 km	MPC · JPL
210492	1997 ST_{9}	—	September 28, 1997	Kitt Peak	Spacewatch	·	2.4 km	MPC · JPL
210493	1997 SO_{23}	—	September 29, 1997	Kitt Peak	Spacewatch	·	2.4 km	MPC · JPL
210494	1997 SO_{34}	—	September 28, 1997	Lake Clear	Williams, K. A.	(13314)	4.1 km	MPC · JPL
210495	1998 FK_{53}	—	March 20, 1998	Socorro	LINEAR	ERI	2.9 km	MPC · JPL
210496	1998 FP_{67}	—	March 20, 1998	Socorro	LINEAR	·	1.9 km	MPC · JPL
210497	1998 HH_{5}	—	April 22, 1998	Kitt Peak	Spacewatch	·	1.5 km	MPC · JPL
210498	1998 HZ_{10}	—	April 17, 1998	Kitt Peak	Spacewatch	·	1.9 km	MPC · JPL
210499	1998 HM_{21}	—	April 20, 1998	Socorro	LINEAR	NYS	2.0 km	MPC · JPL
210500	1998 HN_{25}	—	April 18, 1998	Kitt Peak	Spacewatch	NYS	1.4 km	MPC · JPL

== 210501–210600 ==
back to top

Designation			Discovery			Properties		Ref
Permanent	Provisional	Named after	Date	Site	Discoverer(s)	Category	Diam.	Ref
210501	1998 HG_{50}	—	April 28, 1998	Kitt Peak	Spacewatch	NYS	1.6 km	MPC · JPL
210502	1998 HK_{53}	—	April 21, 1998	Socorro	LINEAR	·	1.5 km	MPC · JPL
210503	1998 HF_{88}	—	April 21, 1998	Socorro	LINEAR	NYS	2.0 km	MPC · JPL
210504	1998 HZ_{95}	—	April 21, 1998	Socorro	LINEAR	·	5.6 km	MPC · JPL
210505	1998 HG_{116}	—	April 23, 1998	Socorro	LINEAR	·	1.9 km	MPC · JPL
210506	1998 KZ_{2}	—	May 18, 1998	Kitt Peak	Spacewatch	HYG	3.9 km	MPC · JPL
210507	1998 KL_{11}	—	May 22, 1998	Kitt Peak	Spacewatch	·	4.3 km	MPC · JPL
210508	1998 MV_{15}	—	June 26, 1998	Kitt Peak	Spacewatch	·	1.9 km	MPC · JPL
210509	1998 MW_{30}	—	June 27, 1998	Kitt Peak	Spacewatch	·	3.0 km	MPC · JPL
210510	1998 NR	—	July 11, 1998	Woomera	F. B. Zoltowski	·	1.4 km	MPC · JPL
210511	1998 OX_{11}	—	July 22, 1998	Reedy Creek	J. Broughton	·	4.9 km	MPC · JPL
210512	1998 QV_{5}	—	August 23, 1998	Kitt Peak	Spacewatch	JUN	1.5 km	MPC · JPL
210513	1998 QR_{70}	—	August 24, 1998	Socorro	LINEAR	EUN	2.4 km	MPC · JPL
210514	1998 QC_{86}	—	August 24, 1998	Socorro	LINEAR	MAR	2.3 km	MPC · JPL
210515	1998 RP_{15}	—	September 15, 1998	Kitt Peak	Spacewatch	·	1.5 km	MPC · JPL
210516	1998 RB_{49}	—	September 14, 1998	Socorro	LINEAR	·	1.3 km	MPC · JPL
210517	1998 RM_{55}	—	September 14, 1998	Socorro	LINEAR	·	2.6 km	MPC · JPL
210518	1998 SX_{43}	—	September 26, 1998	Xinglong	SCAP	·	3.3 km	MPC · JPL
210519	1998 SX_{44}	—	September 25, 1998	Kitt Peak	Spacewatch	(5)	1.3 km	MPC · JPL
210520	1998 SA_{85}	—	September 26, 1998	Socorro	LINEAR	ADE	2.8 km	MPC · JPL
210521	1998 SG_{115}	—	September 26, 1998	Socorro	LINEAR	EUN	2.1 km	MPC · JPL
210522	1998 SL_{116}	—	September 26, 1998	Socorro	LINEAR	·	2.3 km	MPC · JPL
210523	1998 SB_{171}	—	September 25, 1998	Anderson Mesa	LONEOS	·	1.8 km	MPC · JPL
210524	1998 TK_{25}	—	October 14, 1998	Kitt Peak	Spacewatch	·	1.7 km	MPC · JPL
210525	1998 UP_{26}	—	October 18, 1998	La Silla	E. W. Elst	·	4.1 km	MPC · JPL
210526	1998 VC_{41}	—	November 14, 1998	Kitt Peak	Spacewatch	·	2.8 km	MPC · JPL
210527	1998 VA_{47}	—	November 14, 1998	Kitt Peak	Spacewatch	·	1.6 km	MPC · JPL
210528	1999 AW_{13}	—	January 8, 1999	Kitt Peak	Spacewatch	MRX	1.2 km	MPC · JPL
210529	1999 AF_{15}	—	January 8, 1999	Kitt Peak	Spacewatch	·	3.2 km	MPC · JPL
210530	1999 CD_{135}	—	February 7, 1999	Kitt Peak	Spacewatch	·	800 m	MPC · JPL
210531	1999 FB_{1}	—	March 17, 1999	Caussols	ODAS	·	1.4 km	MPC · JPL
210532 Grantmckee	1999 FA_{74}	Grantmckee	March 20, 1999	Apache Point	SDSS	·	2.3 km	MPC · JPL
210533 Seanmisner	1999 FE_{74}	Seanmisner	March 20, 1999	Apache Point	SDSS	·	720 m	MPC · JPL
210534	1999 GH_{3}	—	April 7, 1999	Kitt Peak	Spacewatch	·	3.0 km	MPC · JPL
210535	1999 GE_{14}	—	April 14, 1999	Kitt Peak	Spacewatch	·	960 m	MPC · JPL
210536	1999 HY_{6}	—	April 19, 1999	Kitt Peak	Spacewatch	·	1.1 km	MPC · JPL
210537	1999 JB_{123}	—	May 13, 1999	Socorro	LINEAR	·	1.1 km	MPC · JPL
210538	1999 LO_{3}	—	June 9, 1999	Kitt Peak	Spacewatch	·	960 m	MPC · JPL
210539	1999 RD	—	September 2, 1999	Modra	A. Galád, Š. Gajdoš	PHO	1.8 km	MPC · JPL
210540	1999 RW	—	September 4, 1999	Catalina	CSS	·	1.4 km	MPC · JPL
210541	1999 RN_{8}	—	September 4, 1999	Kitt Peak	Spacewatch	·	1.3 km	MPC · JPL
210542	1999 RG_{57}	—	September 7, 1999	Socorro	LINEAR	·	1.7 km	MPC · JPL
210543	1999 RR_{58}	—	September 7, 1999	Socorro	LINEAR	·	4.3 km	MPC · JPL
210544	1999 RC_{70}	—	September 7, 1999	Socorro	LINEAR	·	1.4 km	MPC · JPL
210545	1999 RM_{164}	—	September 9, 1999	Socorro	LINEAR	·	1.8 km	MPC · JPL
210546	1999 RQ_{174}	—	September 9, 1999	Socorro	LINEAR	·	1.3 km	MPC · JPL
210547	1999 RG_{178}	—	September 9, 1999	Socorro	LINEAR	·	2.1 km	MPC · JPL
210548	1999 RY_{254}	—	September 7, 1999	Anderson Mesa	LONEOS	·	2.4 km	MPC · JPL
210549	1999 TG_{3}	—	October 4, 1999	Prescott	P. G. Comba	·	1.8 km	MPC · JPL
210550	1999 TH_{3}	—	October 4, 1999	Prescott	P. G. Comba	·	1.1 km	MPC · JPL
210551	1999 TP_{4}	—	October 3, 1999	Socorro	LINEAR	H	880 m	MPC · JPL
210552	1999 TA_{28}	—	October 3, 1999	Socorro	LINEAR	NYS	2.6 km	MPC · JPL
210553	1999 TM_{29}	—	October 4, 1999	Socorro	LINEAR	·	1.4 km	MPC · JPL
210554	1999 TO_{40}	—	October 5, 1999	Catalina	CSS	·	2.2 km	MPC · JPL
210555	1999 TZ_{42}	—	October 3, 1999	Kitt Peak	Spacewatch	·	1.3 km	MPC · JPL
210556	1999 TU_{46}	—	October 4, 1999	Kitt Peak	Spacewatch	NYS	1.3 km	MPC · JPL
210557	1999 TO_{65}	—	October 8, 1999	Kitt Peak	Spacewatch	MAS	970 m	MPC · JPL
210558	1999 TW_{87}	—	October 15, 1999	Kitt Peak	Spacewatch	·	4.1 km	MPC · JPL
210559	1999 TA_{136}	—	October 6, 1999	Socorro	LINEAR	CYB	7.4 km	MPC · JPL
210560	1999 TV_{150}	—	October 7, 1999	Socorro	LINEAR	·	1.6 km	MPC · JPL
210561	1999 TE_{168}	—	October 10, 1999	Socorro	LINEAR	·	1.9 km	MPC · JPL
210562	1999 TY_{168}	—	October 10, 1999	Socorro	LINEAR	·	2.2 km	MPC · JPL
210563	1999 TD_{176}	—	October 10, 1999	Socorro	LINEAR	·	1.8 km	MPC · JPL
210564	1999 TR_{195}	—	October 12, 1999	Socorro	LINEAR	·	3.2 km	MPC · JPL
210565	1999 TZ_{201}	—	October 13, 1999	Socorro	LINEAR	·	1.5 km	MPC · JPL
210566	1999 TG_{207}	—	October 14, 1999	Socorro	LINEAR	H	1.1 km	MPC · JPL
210567	1999 TV_{214}	—	October 15, 1999	Socorro	LINEAR	·	1.9 km	MPC · JPL
210568	1999 TB_{218}	—	October 15, 1999	Socorro	LINEAR	·	1.4 km	MPC · JPL
210569	1999 TG_{234}	—	October 3, 1999	Socorro	LINEAR	·	7.4 km	MPC · JPL
210570	1999 TK_{255}	—	October 9, 1999	Kitt Peak	Spacewatch	·	1.4 km	MPC · JPL
210571	1999 TU_{257}	—	October 9, 1999	Socorro	LINEAR	H	940 m	MPC · JPL
210572	1999 TV_{312}	—	October 8, 1999	Catalina	CSS	·	5.8 km	MPC · JPL
210573	1999 UL_{20}	—	October 31, 1999	Kitt Peak	Spacewatch	·	1.4 km	MPC · JPL
210574	1999 UY_{22}	—	October 31, 1999	Kitt Peak	Spacewatch	·	1.3 km	MPC · JPL
210575	1999 UR_{31}	—	October 31, 1999	Kitt Peak	Spacewatch	·	2.6 km	MPC · JPL
210576	1999 VW_{7}	—	November 7, 1999	Višnjan	K. Korlević	(5)	2.2 km	MPC · JPL
210577	1999 VV_{31}	—	November 3, 1999	Socorro	LINEAR	·	1.8 km	MPC · JPL
210578	1999 VN_{64}	—	November 4, 1999	Socorro	LINEAR	·	2.5 km	MPC · JPL
210579	1999 VS_{65}	—	November 4, 1999	Socorro	LINEAR	(5)	1.6 km	MPC · JPL
210580	1999 VN_{74}	—	November 5, 1999	Kitt Peak	Spacewatch	·	4.5 km	MPC · JPL
210581	1999 VP_{102}	—	November 9, 1999	Socorro	LINEAR	·	1.9 km	MPC · JPL
210582	1999 VS_{157}	—	November 14, 1999	Socorro	LINEAR	·	2.4 km	MPC · JPL
210583	1999 VX_{182}	—	November 9, 1999	Socorro	LINEAR	·	1.2 km	MPC · JPL
210584	1999 VE_{189}	—	November 15, 1999	Socorro	LINEAR	(5)	1.3 km	MPC · JPL
210585	1999 VT_{191}	—	November 9, 1999	Socorro	LINEAR	MAS	1.5 km	MPC · JPL
210586	1999 VL_{224}	—	November 5, 1999	Kitt Peak	Spacewatch	·	1.5 km	MPC · JPL
210587	1999 XL_{12}	—	December 5, 1999	Socorro	LINEAR	·	3.0 km	MPC · JPL
210588	1999 XB_{28}	—	December 6, 1999	Socorro	LINEAR	·	1.8 km	MPC · JPL
210589	1999 XU_{40}	—	December 7, 1999	Socorro	LINEAR	·	1.8 km	MPC · JPL
210590	1999 XA_{51}	—	December 7, 1999	Socorro	LINEAR	·	1.8 km	MPC · JPL
210591	1999 XH_{70}	—	December 7, 1999	Socorro	LINEAR	(5)	1.8 km	MPC · JPL
210592	1999 XW_{97}	—	December 7, 1999	Socorro	LINEAR	·	3.0 km	MPC · JPL
210593	1999 XP_{109}	—	December 4, 1999	Catalina	CSS	(5)	1.9 km	MPC · JPL
210594	1999 XY_{123}	—	December 7, 1999	Catalina	CSS	·	3.7 km	MPC · JPL
210595	1999 XA_{147}	—	December 7, 1999	Kitt Peak	Spacewatch	·	3.0 km	MPC · JPL
210596	1999 XC_{239}	—	December 7, 1999	Kitt Peak	Spacewatch	·	1.3 km	MPC · JPL
210597	1999 XQ_{240}	—	December 8, 1999	Catalina	CSS	·	2.7 km	MPC · JPL
210598	1999 XG_{241}	—	December 12, 1999	Catalina	CSS	·	5.4 km	MPC · JPL
210599	1999 YG_{6}	—	December 30, 1999	Socorro	LINEAR	·	3.0 km	MPC · JPL
210600	2000 AM_{1}	—	January 2, 2000	Socorro	LINEAR	·	2.5 km	MPC · JPL

== 210601–210700 ==
back to top

Designation			Discovery			Properties		Ref
Permanent	Provisional	Named after	Date	Site	Discoverer(s)	Category	Diam.	Ref
210601	2000 AJ_{4}	—	January 3, 2000	Kitt Peak	Spacewatch	·	2.0 km	MPC · JPL
210602	2000 AO_{21}	—	January 3, 2000	Socorro	LINEAR	(5)	2.6 km	MPC · JPL
210603	2000 AD_{48}	—	January 4, 2000	Grasslands	McGaha, J.	(5)	2.0 km	MPC · JPL
210604	2000 AW_{68}	—	January 5, 2000	Socorro	LINEAR	·	2.3 km	MPC · JPL
210605	2000 AD_{79}	—	January 5, 2000	Socorro	LINEAR	ADE	2.7 km	MPC · JPL
210606	2000 AB_{82}	—	January 5, 2000	Socorro	LINEAR	·	4.1 km	MPC · JPL
210607	2000 AF_{115}	—	January 5, 2000	Socorro	LINEAR	·	2.8 km	MPC · JPL
210608	2000 AC_{230}	—	January 3, 2000	Socorro	LINEAR	(5)	2.0 km	MPC · JPL
210609	2000 AF_{238}	—	January 6, 2000	Socorro	LINEAR	·	1.3 km	MPC · JPL
210610	2000 BQ_{9}	—	January 26, 2000	Kitt Peak	Spacewatch	MAS	750 m	MPC · JPL
210611	2000 BH_{20}	—	January 26, 2000	Kitt Peak	Spacewatch	·	1.1 km	MPC · JPL
210612	2000 CD_{8}	—	February 2, 2000	Socorro	LINEAR	(5)	2.1 km	MPC · JPL
210613	2000 CO_{78}	—	February 8, 2000	Kitt Peak	Spacewatch	·	1.8 km	MPC · JPL
210614	2000 CK_{81}	—	February 4, 2000	Socorro	LINEAR	·	1.8 km	MPC · JPL
210615	2000 DW_{8}	—	February 26, 2000	Kitt Peak	Spacewatch	·	2.0 km	MPC · JPL
210616	2000 DO_{24}	—	February 29, 2000	Socorro	LINEAR	ADE	2.9 km	MPC · JPL
210617	2000 DG_{33}	—	February 29, 2000	Socorro	LINEAR	·	3.1 km	MPC · JPL
210618	2000 DN_{45}	—	February 29, 2000	Socorro	LINEAR	·	3.8 km	MPC · JPL
210619	2000 DQ_{55}	—	February 29, 2000	Socorro	LINEAR	·	3.3 km	MPC · JPL
210620	2000 DJ_{115}	—	February 27, 2000	Kitt Peak	Spacewatch	·	2.4 km	MPC · JPL
210621	2000 EB_{16}	—	March 3, 2000	Kitt Peak	Spacewatch	·	2.7 km	MPC · JPL
210622	2000 EB_{18}	—	March 4, 2000	Socorro	LINEAR	HNS	2.1 km	MPC · JPL
210623	2000 EN_{28}	—	March 4, 2000	Socorro	LINEAR	·	2.6 km	MPC · JPL
210624	2000 EX_{43}	—	March 8, 2000	Socorro	LINEAR	·	3.5 km	MPC · JPL
210625	2000 EC_{94}	—	March 9, 2000	Socorro	LINEAR	·	2.6 km	MPC · JPL
210626	2000 ET_{100}	—	March 12, 2000	Kitt Peak	Spacewatch	·	2.0 km	MPC · JPL
210627	2000 EC_{102}	—	March 14, 2000	Kitt Peak	Spacewatch	·	2.1 km	MPC · JPL
210628	2000 EG_{150}	—	March 5, 2000	Haleakala	NEAT	·	2.9 km	MPC · JPL
210629	2000 EQ_{153}	—	March 6, 2000	Haleakala	NEAT	·	2.8 km	MPC · JPL
210630	2000 EJ_{163}	—	March 3, 2000	Socorro	LINEAR	·	2.7 km	MPC · JPL
210631	2000 EZ_{199}	—	March 1, 2000	Catalina	CSS	·	3.0 km	MPC · JPL
210632	2000 FF_{33}	—	March 29, 2000	Socorro	LINEAR	·	3.3 km	MPC · JPL
210633	2000 FK_{41}	—	March 29, 2000	Socorro	LINEAR	ADE	3.6 km	MPC · JPL
210634	2000 FM_{47}	—	March 29, 2000	Socorro	LINEAR	·	2.2 km	MPC · JPL
210635	2000 GQ_{7}	—	April 4, 2000	Anderson Mesa	LONEOS	·	1.8 km	MPC · JPL
210636	2000 GT_{12}	—	April 5, 2000	Socorro	LINEAR	EUN	2.1 km	MPC · JPL
210637	2000 GL_{16}	—	April 5, 2000	Socorro	LINEAR	ADE	4.3 km	MPC · JPL
210638	2000 GT_{31}	—	April 5, 2000	Socorro	LINEAR	·	1.6 km	MPC · JPL
210639	2000 GU_{50}	—	April 5, 2000	Socorro	LINEAR	·	2.8 km	MPC · JPL
210640	2000 GW_{61}	—	April 5, 2000	Socorro	LINEAR	·	2.0 km	MPC · JPL
210641	2000 GA_{116}	—	April 8, 2000	Socorro	LINEAR	·	2.9 km	MPC · JPL
210642	2000 GL_{137}	—	April 14, 2000	Prescott	P. G. Comba	·	3.6 km	MPC · JPL
210643	2000 GM_{151}	—	April 5, 2000	Socorro	LINEAR	·	4.0 km	MPC · JPL
210644	2000 HS_{10}	—	April 27, 2000	Socorro	LINEAR	·	4.7 km	MPC · JPL
210645	2000 HH_{20}	—	April 29, 2000	Kitt Peak	Spacewatch	·	3.0 km	MPC · JPL
210646	2000 HM_{23}	—	April 30, 2000	Socorro	LINEAR	·	3.0 km	MPC · JPL
210647	2000 HZ_{61}	—	April 25, 2000	Anderson Mesa	LONEOS	DOR	5.0 km	MPC · JPL
210648	2000 HL_{75}	—	April 27, 2000	Socorro	LINEAR	·	3.4 km	MPC · JPL
210649	2000 HG_{80}	—	April 28, 2000	Anderson Mesa	LONEOS	·	4.2 km	MPC · JPL
210650	2000 JO_{6}	—	May 4, 2000	Socorro	LINEAR	·	3.9 km	MPC · JPL
210651	2000 JX_{7}	—	May 5, 2000	Kitt Peak	Spacewatch	·	2.9 km	MPC · JPL
210652	2000 JL_{83}	—	May 6, 2000	Kitt Peak	Spacewatch	AGN	1.9 km	MPC · JPL
210653	2000 KX_{8}	—	May 28, 2000	Socorro	LINEAR	EUN	4.4 km	MPC · JPL
210654	2000 KS_{13}	—	May 28, 2000	Socorro	LINEAR	·	2.9 km	MPC · JPL
210655	2000 NQ_{7}	—	July 4, 2000	Kitt Peak	Spacewatch	·	1.2 km	MPC · JPL
210656	2000 OA_{23}	—	July 23, 2000	Socorro	LINEAR	·	1.3 km	MPC · JPL
210657	2000 OL_{34}	—	July 30, 2000	Socorro	LINEAR	·	3.9 km	MPC · JPL
210658	2000 PQ_{21}	—	August 1, 2000	Socorro	LINEAR	·	1.1 km	MPC · JPL
210659	2000 QG_{11}	—	August 24, 2000	Socorro	LINEAR	·	920 m	MPC · JPL
210660	2000 QG_{23}	—	August 25, 2000	Socorro	LINEAR	·	1.2 km	MPC · JPL
210661	2000 QG_{26}	—	August 26, 2000	Ondřejov	P. Kušnirák, P. Pravec	·	1.2 km	MPC · JPL
210662	2000 QU_{31}	—	August 26, 2000	Socorro	LINEAR	·	1.3 km	MPC · JPL
210663	2000 QS_{66}	—	August 28, 2000	Socorro	LINEAR	·	990 m	MPC · JPL
210664	2000 QB_{68}	—	August 28, 2000	Socorro	LINEAR	·	1.4 km	MPC · JPL
210665	2000 QG_{83}	—	August 24, 2000	Socorro	LINEAR	·	1.1 km	MPC · JPL
210666	2000 QW_{94}	—	August 26, 2000	Socorro	LINEAR	HYG	5.3 km	MPC · JPL
210667	2000 QG_{100}	—	August 28, 2000	Socorro	LINEAR	·	1.3 km	MPC · JPL
210668	2000 QS_{100}	—	August 28, 2000	Socorro	LINEAR	·	1.3 km	MPC · JPL
210669	2000 QK_{117}	—	August 28, 2000	Socorro	LINEAR	·	1.5 km	MPC · JPL
210670	2000 QW_{166}	—	August 31, 2000	Socorro	LINEAR	·	1.2 km	MPC · JPL
210671	2000 QR_{172}	—	August 31, 2000	Socorro	LINEAR	·	940 m	MPC · JPL
210672	2000 QZ_{188}	—	August 26, 2000	Socorro	LINEAR	·	4.9 km	MPC · JPL
210673	2000 QQ_{198}	—	August 29, 2000	Socorro	LINEAR	·	980 m	MPC · JPL
210674	2000 QO_{205}	—	August 31, 2000	Socorro	LINEAR	·	1.1 km	MPC · JPL
210675	2000 QF_{213}	—	August 31, 2000	Socorro	LINEAR	·	7.2 km	MPC · JPL
210676	2000 QB_{217}	—	August 31, 2000	Socorro	LINEAR	NYS	1.8 km	MPC · JPL
210677	2000 RB_{4}	—	September 1, 2000	Socorro	LINEAR	·	5.1 km	MPC · JPL
210678	2000 RK_{37}	—	September 3, 2000	Socorro	LINEAR	·	3.1 km	MPC · JPL
210679	2000 RV_{40}	—	September 3, 2000	Socorro	LINEAR	·	3.8 km	MPC · JPL
210680	2000 RK_{64}	—	September 1, 2000	Socorro	LINEAR	·	3.7 km	MPC · JPL
210681	2000 RD_{74}	—	September 2, 2000	Socorro	LINEAR	·	5.0 km	MPC · JPL
210682	2000 RQ_{78}	—	September 8, 2000	Kitt Peak	Spacewatch	·	2.6 km	MPC · JPL
210683	2000 RL_{85}	—	September 2, 2000	Anderson Mesa	LONEOS	·	2.4 km	MPC · JPL
210684	2000 RX_{91}	—	September 3, 2000	Socorro	LINEAR	·	1.7 km	MPC · JPL
210685	2000 RE_{92}	—	September 3, 2000	Socorro	LINEAR	·	1.4 km	MPC · JPL
210686 Scottnorris	2000 RR_{107}	Scottnorris	September 3, 2000	Apache Point	SDSS	·	3.9 km	MPC · JPL
210687	2000 SO	—	September 19, 2000	Kitt Peak	Spacewatch	·	5.7 km	MPC · JPL
210688	2000 SZ_{26}	—	September 23, 2000	Socorro	LINEAR	EUP	6.2 km	MPC · JPL
210689	2000 SG_{30}	—	September 24, 2000	Socorro	LINEAR	·	1.4 km	MPC · JPL
210690	2000 SV_{38}	—	September 24, 2000	Socorro	LINEAR	·	1.2 km	MPC · JPL
210691	2000 SB_{59}	—	September 24, 2000	Socorro	LINEAR	·	1.0 km	MPC · JPL
210692	2000 SU_{60}	—	September 24, 2000	Socorro	LINEAR	·	1.1 km	MPC · JPL
210693	2000 SV_{60}	—	September 24, 2000	Socorro	LINEAR	·	1.3 km	MPC · JPL
210694	2000 SK_{62}	—	September 24, 2000	Socorro	LINEAR	EUP	6.6 km	MPC · JPL
210695	2000 SY_{74}	—	September 24, 2000	Socorro	LINEAR	·	5.7 km	MPC · JPL
210696	2000 SD_{78}	—	September 24, 2000	Socorro	LINEAR	·	6.5 km	MPC · JPL
210697	2000 SQ_{80}	—	September 24, 2000	Socorro	LINEAR	·	6.5 km	MPC · JPL
210698	2000 SM_{94}	—	September 23, 2000	Socorro	LINEAR	·	6.3 km	MPC · JPL
210699	2000 SX_{101}	—	September 24, 2000	Socorro	LINEAR	NYS	1.1 km	MPC · JPL
210700	2000 SQ_{105}	—	September 24, 2000	Socorro	LINEAR	NYS	1.2 km	MPC · JPL

== 210701–210800 ==
back to top

Designation			Discovery			Properties		Ref
Permanent	Provisional	Named after	Date	Site	Discoverer(s)	Category	Diam.	Ref
210701	2000 SA_{116}	—	September 24, 2000	Socorro	LINEAR	·	1.4 km	MPC · JPL
210702	2000 SQ_{124}	—	September 24, 2000	Socorro	LINEAR	V	1.1 km	MPC · JPL
210703	2000 SS_{139}	—	September 23, 2000	Socorro	LINEAR	·	1.1 km	MPC · JPL
210704	2000 SB_{146}	—	September 24, 2000	Socorro	LINEAR	·	4.1 km	MPC · JPL
210705	2000 SY_{155}	—	September 24, 2000	Socorro	LINEAR	·	1.5 km	MPC · JPL
210706	2000 SR_{157}	—	September 27, 2000	Socorro	LINEAR	·	1.1 km	MPC · JPL
210707	2000 SD_{159}	—	September 27, 2000	Kitt Peak	Spacewatch	ERI	2.4 km	MPC · JPL
210708	2000 SU_{164}	—	September 28, 2000	Socorro	LINEAR	H	640 m	MPC · JPL
210709	2000 SH_{190}	—	September 23, 2000	Kitt Peak	Spacewatch	EMA	4.9 km	MPC · JPL
210710	2000 SD_{194}	—	September 24, 2000	Socorro	LINEAR	·	1.6 km	MPC · JPL
210711	2000 SB_{200}	—	September 24, 2000	Socorro	LINEAR	URS	5.9 km	MPC · JPL
210712	2000 SB_{201}	—	September 24, 2000	Socorro	LINEAR	·	1.0 km	MPC · JPL
210713	2000 SQ_{204}	—	September 24, 2000	Socorro	LINEAR	MAS	880 m	MPC · JPL
210714	2000 SW_{212}	—	September 25, 2000	Socorro	LINEAR	CYB	8.0 km	MPC · JPL
210715	2000 SU_{214}	—	September 26, 2000	Socorro	LINEAR	(1298)	4.0 km	MPC · JPL
210716	2000 SP_{246}	—	September 24, 2000	Socorro	LINEAR	·	2.8 km	MPC · JPL
210717	2000 SR_{250}	—	September 24, 2000	Socorro	LINEAR	·	1.4 km	MPC · JPL
210718	2000 ST_{252}	—	September 24, 2000	Socorro	LINEAR	T_{j} (2.96) · CYB	5.5 km	MPC · JPL
210719	2000 SW_{277}	—	September 30, 2000	Socorro	LINEAR	·	2.3 km	MPC · JPL
210720	2000 SA_{286}	—	September 24, 2000	Socorro	LINEAR	·	5.2 km	MPC · JPL
210721	2000 SQ_{303}	—	September 28, 2000	Socorro	LINEAR	·	1.9 km	MPC · JPL
210722	2000 SZ_{306}	—	September 30, 2000	Socorro	LINEAR	·	1.3 km	MPC · JPL
210723	2000 SQ_{308}	—	September 30, 2000	Socorro	LINEAR	(2076)	1.4 km	MPC · JPL
210724	2000 SE_{335}	—	September 26, 2000	Haleakala	NEAT	·	3.3 km	MPC · JPL
210725	2000 SG_{335}	—	September 26, 2000	Socorro	LINEAR	·	1.5 km	MPC · JPL
210726	2000 SN_{337}	—	September 25, 2000	Kitt Peak	Spacewatch	·	5.4 km	MPC · JPL
210727	2000 SF_{364}	—	September 20, 2000	Socorro	LINEAR	·	890 m	MPC · JPL
210728	2000 TL_{6}	—	October 1, 2000	Socorro	LINEAR	·	3.5 km	MPC · JPL
210729	2000 TG_{8}	—	October 1, 2000	Socorro	LINEAR	·	5.0 km	MPC · JPL
210730	2000 TS_{14}	—	October 1, 2000	Socorro	LINEAR	·	1.1 km	MPC · JPL
210731	2000 TZ_{16}	—	October 1, 2000	Socorro	LINEAR	·	5.8 km	MPC · JPL
210732	2000 TF_{23}	—	October 1, 2000	Socorro	LINEAR	NYS	1.6 km	MPC · JPL
210733	2000 TZ_{23}	—	October 2, 2000	Socorro	LINEAR	EOS	3.0 km	MPC · JPL
210734	2000 TJ_{36}	—	October 6, 2000	Anderson Mesa	LONEOS	·	1.3 km	MPC · JPL
210735	2000 TA_{38}	—	October 1, 2000	Socorro	LINEAR	·	1.5 km	MPC · JPL
210736	2000 TQ_{65}	—	October 1, 2000	Socorro	LINEAR	·	1.1 km	MPC · JPL
210737	2000 UC_{1}	—	October 21, 2000	Višnjan	K. Korlević	·	1.6 km	MPC · JPL
210738	2000 US_{15}	—	October 27, 2000	Kitt Peak	Spacewatch	·	860 m	MPC · JPL
210739	2000 UD_{17}	—	October 24, 2000	Socorro	LINEAR	NYS	1.4 km	MPC · JPL
210740	2000 UA_{43}	—	October 24, 2000	Socorro	LINEAR	NYS	1.5 km	MPC · JPL
210741	2000 UW_{65}	—	October 25, 2000	Socorro	LINEAR	·	960 m	MPC · JPL
210742	2000 UV_{66}	—	October 25, 2000	Socorro	LINEAR	·	1.9 km	MPC · JPL
210743	2000 UX_{71}	—	October 25, 2000	Socorro	LINEAR	·	1.6 km	MPC · JPL
210744	2000 UE_{75}	—	October 31, 2000	Socorro	LINEAR	·	1.3 km	MPC · JPL
210745	2000 UY_{91}	—	October 25, 2000	Socorro	LINEAR	(2076)	1.3 km	MPC · JPL
210746	2000 US_{104}	—	October 25, 2000	Socorro	LINEAR	·	6.8 km	MPC · JPL
210747	2000 UD_{112}	—	October 30, 2000	Socorro	LINEAR	·	4.4 km	MPC · JPL
210748	2000 UT_{114}	—	October 25, 2000	Socorro	LINEAR	·	1.3 km	MPC · JPL
210749	2000 VL_{8}	—	November 1, 2000	Socorro	LINEAR	NYS	1.3 km	MPC · JPL
210750	2000 VO_{12}	—	November 1, 2000	Socorro	LINEAR	·	1.2 km	MPC · JPL
210751	2000 VZ_{23}	—	November 1, 2000	Socorro	LINEAR	·	1.7 km	MPC · JPL
210752	2000 VV_{47}	—	November 1, 2000	Socorro	LINEAR	·	1.8 km	MPC · JPL
210753	2000 VU_{51}	—	November 3, 2000	Socorro	LINEAR	·	1.2 km	MPC · JPL
210754	2000 VF_{57}	—	November 3, 2000	Socorro	LINEAR	·	2.1 km	MPC · JPL
210755	2000 WE_{15}	—	November 20, 2000	Socorro	LINEAR	·	2.5 km	MPC · JPL
210756	2000 WT_{15}	—	November 21, 2000	Socorro	LINEAR	V	990 m	MPC · JPL
210757	2000 WK_{26}	—	November 25, 2000	Socorro	LINEAR	·	1.3 km	MPC · JPL
210758	2000 WR_{73}	—	November 20, 2000	Socorro	LINEAR	V	860 m	MPC · JPL
210759	2000 WW_{77}	—	November 20, 2000	Socorro	LINEAR	·	1.7 km	MPC · JPL
210760	2000 WW_{88}	—	November 21, 2000	Socorro	LINEAR	·	2.1 km	MPC · JPL
210761	2000 WT_{92}	—	November 21, 2000	Socorro	LINEAR	NYS	1.5 km	MPC · JPL
210762	2000 WY_{97}	—	November 21, 2000	Socorro	LINEAR	·	1.7 km	MPC · JPL
210763	2000 WL_{111}	—	November 20, 2000	Socorro	LINEAR	·	1.5 km	MPC · JPL
210764	2000 WZ_{134}	—	November 19, 2000	Socorro	LINEAR	·	1.2 km	MPC · JPL
210765	2000 WS_{160}	—	November 20, 2000	Anderson Mesa	LONEOS	·	2.1 km	MPC · JPL
210766	2000 WU_{188}	—	November 18, 2000	Anderson Mesa	LONEOS	·	1.6 km	MPC · JPL
210767	2000 XY_{20}	—	December 4, 2000	Socorro	LINEAR	·	2.6 km	MPC · JPL
210768	2000 XR_{53}	—	December 4, 2000	Uccle	T. Pauwels	·	2.1 km	MPC · JPL
210769	2000 YC_{43}	—	December 30, 2000	Socorro	LINEAR	·	2.0 km	MPC · JPL
210770	2000 YL_{65}	—	December 16, 2000	Kitt Peak	Spacewatch	·	1.6 km	MPC · JPL
210771	2000 YP_{128}	—	December 29, 2000	Haleakala	NEAT	·	1.7 km	MPC · JPL
210772	2001 AN_{8}	—	January 2, 2001	Socorro	LINEAR	·	1.5 km	MPC · JPL
210773	2001 AL_{19}	—	January 4, 2001	Socorro	LINEAR	H	800 m	MPC · JPL
210774	2001 AO_{31}	—	January 4, 2001	Socorro	LINEAR	·	2.3 km	MPC · JPL
210775	2001 AS_{43}	—	January 3, 2001	Socorro	LINEAR	H	1.1 km	MPC · JPL
210776	2001 BV_{21}	—	January 20, 2001	Socorro	LINEAR	·	2.2 km	MPC · JPL
210777	2001 BU_{24}	—	January 20, 2001	Socorro	LINEAR	·	1.6 km	MPC · JPL
210778	2001 BJ_{37}	—	January 21, 2001	Socorro	LINEAR	NYS	1.7 km	MPC · JPL
210779	2001 BF_{59}	—	January 21, 2001	Socorro	LINEAR	EUN	1.9 km	MPC · JPL
210780	2001 BK_{82}	—	January 21, 2001	Socorro	LINEAR	·	3.0 km	MPC · JPL
210781	2001 CP_{21}	—	February 1, 2001	Anderson Mesa	LONEOS	·	1.8 km	MPC · JPL
210782	2001 DK_{1}	—	February 16, 2001	Kitt Peak	Spacewatch	·	1.5 km	MPC · JPL
210783	2001 DK_{22}	—	February 16, 2001	Socorro	LINEAR	H	800 m	MPC · JPL
210784	2001 DZ_{33}	—	February 17, 2001	Socorro	LINEAR	·	1.6 km	MPC · JPL
210785	2001 DX_{39}	—	February 19, 2001	Socorro	LINEAR	·	2.0 km	MPC · JPL
210786	2001 DP_{60}	—	February 19, 2001	Socorro	LINEAR	·	1.9 km	MPC · JPL
210787	2001 DJ_{77}	—	February 16, 2001	Kitt Peak	Spacewatch	·	2.0 km	MPC · JPL
210788	2001 DW_{77}	—	February 22, 2001	Kitt Peak	Spacewatch	V	990 m	MPC · JPL
210789	2001 DH_{88}	—	February 24, 2001	Haleakala	NEAT	H	880 m	MPC · JPL
210790	2001 DE_{96}	—	February 17, 2001	Socorro	LINEAR	·	2.0 km	MPC · JPL
210791	2001 EL_{5}	—	March 2, 2001	Anderson Mesa	LONEOS	·	2.1 km	MPC · JPL
210792	2001 EA_{11}	—	March 2, 2001	Haleakala	NEAT	·	1.8 km	MPC · JPL
210793	2001 EC_{17}	—	March 14, 2001	Socorro	LINEAR	H	830 m	MPC · JPL
210794	2001 ES_{18}	—	March 14, 2001	Anderson Mesa	LONEOS	H	790 m	MPC · JPL
210795	2001 FL	—	March 16, 2001	Socorro	LINEAR	H	890 m	MPC · JPL
210796	2001 FC_{6}	—	March 19, 2001	Socorro	LINEAR	·	1.9 km	MPC · JPL
210797	2001 FS_{7}	—	March 20, 2001	Kitt Peak	Spacewatch	·	1.7 km	MPC · JPL
210798	2001 FW_{27}	—	March 18, 2001	Socorro	LINEAR	H	1.0 km	MPC · JPL
210799	2001 FK_{29}	—	March 21, 2001	Socorro	LINEAR	H	1.1 km	MPC · JPL
210800	2001 FB_{76}	—	March 19, 2001	Socorro	LINEAR	·	3.6 km	MPC · JPL

== 210801–210900 ==
back to top

Designation			Discovery			Properties		Ref
Permanent	Provisional	Named after	Date	Site	Discoverer(s)	Category	Diam.	Ref
210801	2001 FS_{110}	—	March 18, 2001	Socorro	LINEAR	·	890 m	MPC · JPL
210802	2001 FG_{137}	—	March 21, 2001	Anderson Mesa	LONEOS	H	1.0 km	MPC · JPL
210803	2001 FM_{167}	—	March 19, 2001	Socorro	LINEAR	H	950 m	MPC · JPL
210804	2001 FZ_{189}	—	March 18, 2001	Anderson Mesa	LONEOS	·	2.7 km	MPC · JPL
210805	2001 GO_{7}	—	April 15, 2001	Socorro	LINEAR	·	2.0 km	MPC · JPL
210806	2001 HN_{40}	—	April 27, 2001	Socorro	LINEAR	·	1.9 km	MPC · JPL
210807	2001 HQ_{40}	—	April 27, 2001	Socorro	LINEAR	·	4.2 km	MPC · JPL
210808	2001 HO_{66}	—	April 24, 2001	Haleakala	NEAT	MAR	1.8 km	MPC · JPL
210809	2001 JQ_{9}	—	May 15, 2001	Haleakala	NEAT	·	2.2 km	MPC · JPL
210810	2001 KS	—	May 17, 2001	Socorro	LINEAR	·	2.0 km	MPC · JPL
210811	2001 KC_{14}	—	May 18, 2001	Socorro	LINEAR	·	1.9 km	MPC · JPL
210812	2001 KW_{19}	—	May 22, 2001	Socorro	LINEAR	(5)	2.1 km	MPC · JPL
210813	2001 KV_{22}	—	May 17, 2001	Socorro	LINEAR	·	1.6 km	MPC · JPL
210814	2001 KZ_{31}	—	May 23, 2001	Socorro	LINEAR	RAF	1.6 km	MPC · JPL
210815	2001 KM_{43}	—	May 22, 2001	Socorro	LINEAR	·	2.0 km	MPC · JPL
210816	2001 KH_{62}	—	May 18, 2001	Socorro	LINEAR	·	2.4 km	MPC · JPL
210817	2001 KY_{74}	—	May 28, 2001	Haleakala	NEAT	·	3.3 km	MPC · JPL
210818	2001 LL_{7}	—	June 15, 2001	Socorro	LINEAR	JUN	1.9 km	MPC · JPL
210819	2001 MH_{10}	—	June 18, 2001	Palomar	NEAT	(5)	1.8 km	MPC · JPL
210820	2001 NY_{3}	—	July 13, 2001	Palomar	NEAT	·	1.6 km	MPC · JPL
210821	2001 NN_{5}	—	July 13, 2001	Palomar	NEAT	MRX	1.2 km	MPC · JPL
210822	2001 NJ_{11}	—	July 14, 2001	Haleakala	NEAT	·	3.2 km	MPC · JPL
210823	2001 NV_{17}	—	July 14, 2001	Haleakala	NEAT	·	3.5 km	MPC · JPL
210824	2001 NJ_{18}	—	July 12, 2001	Palomar	NEAT	·	4.6 km	MPC · JPL
210825	2001 NL_{18}	—	July 12, 2001	Palomar	NEAT	·	2.7 km	MPC · JPL
210826	2001 OV_{17}	—	July 17, 2001	Haleakala	NEAT	·	2.2 km	MPC · JPL
210827	2001 OL_{22}	—	July 19, 2001	Anza	White, M., M. Collins	·	2.8 km	MPC · JPL
210828	2001 OP_{37}	—	July 20, 2001	Palomar	NEAT	·	2.1 km	MPC · JPL
210829	2001 OV_{45}	—	July 16, 2001	Anderson Mesa	LONEOS	·	3.6 km	MPC · JPL
210830	2001 OZ_{52}	—	July 21, 2001	Palomar	NEAT	·	2.7 km	MPC · JPL
210831	2001 OB_{84}	—	July 17, 2001	Siding Spring	R. H. McNaught	BAR	2.6 km	MPC · JPL
210832	2001 PG_{5}	—	August 9, 2001	Palomar	NEAT	·	4.7 km	MPC · JPL
210833	2001 PQ_{5}	—	August 10, 2001	Palomar	NEAT	DOR	4.6 km	MPC · JPL
210834	2001 PR_{39}	—	August 11, 2001	Haleakala	NEAT	TIR	4.6 km	MPC · JPL
210835	2001 PO_{41}	—	August 11, 2001	Palomar	NEAT	·	4.1 km	MPC · JPL
210836	2001 PB_{46}	—	August 12, 2001	Palomar	NEAT	BRA	2.7 km	MPC · JPL
210837	2001 PT_{46}	—	August 13, 2001	Palomar	NEAT	·	2.7 km	MPC · JPL
210838	2001 PR_{62}	—	August 13, 2001	Haleakala	NEAT	·	3.2 km	MPC · JPL
210839	2001 QY_{15}	—	August 16, 2001	Socorro	LINEAR	·	5.5 km	MPC · JPL
210840	2001 QQ_{87}	—	August 21, 2001	Haleakala	NEAT	GEF	1.8 km	MPC · JPL
210841	2001 QE_{107}	—	August 23, 2001	Socorro	LINEAR	·	7.0 km	MPC · JPL
210842	2001 QJ_{126}	—	August 20, 2001	Socorro	LINEAR	·	1.6 km	MPC · JPL
210843	2001 QE_{146}	—	August 25, 2001	Kitt Peak	Spacewatch	·	2.0 km	MPC · JPL
210844	2001 QK_{184}	—	August 21, 2001	Socorro	LINEAR	·	3.5 km	MPC · JPL
210845	2001 QA_{192}	—	August 22, 2001	Haleakala	NEAT	·	3.0 km	MPC · JPL
210846	2001 QF_{211}	—	August 23, 2001	Anderson Mesa	LONEOS	·	2.4 km	MPC · JPL
210847	2001 QY_{214}	—	August 23, 2001	Anderson Mesa	LONEOS	EOS	2.2 km	MPC · JPL
210848	2001 QD_{241}	—	August 24, 2001	Socorro	LINEAR	·	2.1 km	MPC · JPL
210849	2001 QD_{253}	—	August 25, 2001	Socorro	LINEAR	·	2.6 km	MPC · JPL
210850	2001 QX_{267}	—	August 20, 2001	Socorro	LINEAR	·	3.6 km	MPC · JPL
210851	2001 QD_{275}	—	August 19, 2001	Socorro	LINEAR	MRX	1.6 km	MPC · JPL
210852	2001 QN_{283}	—	August 18, 2001	Palomar	NEAT	·	3.7 km	MPC · JPL
210853	2001 QJ_{290}	—	August 16, 2001	Socorro	LINEAR	·	2.1 km	MPC · JPL
210854 Stevejaskulek	2001 QE_{317}	Stevejaskulek	August 20, 2001	Cerro Tololo	M. W. Buie	·	3.5 km	MPC · JPL
210855	2001 RU_{24}	—	September 7, 2001	Socorro	LINEAR	·	2.7 km	MPC · JPL
210856	2001 RN_{30}	—	September 7, 2001	Socorro	LINEAR	·	2.3 km	MPC · JPL
210857	2001 RU_{36}	—	September 8, 2001	Socorro	LINEAR	AGN	1.7 km	MPC · JPL
210858	2001 RM_{41}	—	September 11, 2001	Socorro	LINEAR	·	3.5 km	MPC · JPL
210859	2001 RQ_{41}	—	September 11, 2001	Socorro	LINEAR	·	2.5 km	MPC · JPL
210860	2001 RV_{41}	—	September 11, 2001	Socorro	LINEAR	KOR	1.8 km	MPC · JPL
210861	2001 RF_{46}	—	September 12, 2001	Goodricke-Pigott	R. A. Tucker	·	4.0 km	MPC · JPL
210862	2001 RF_{53}	—	September 12, 2001	Socorro	LINEAR	·	2.1 km	MPC · JPL
210863	2001 RS_{60}	—	September 12, 2001	Socorro	LINEAR	·	3.2 km	MPC · JPL
210864	2001 RG_{62}	—	September 12, 2001	Socorro	LINEAR	(16286)	3.1 km	MPC · JPL
210865	2001 RM_{84}	—	September 11, 2001	Anderson Mesa	LONEOS	·	3.8 km	MPC · JPL
210866	2001 RB_{85}	—	September 11, 2001	Anderson Mesa	LONEOS	URS	7.3 km	MPC · JPL
210867	2001 RM_{99}	—	September 12, 2001	Socorro	LINEAR	HOF	4.4 km	MPC · JPL
210868	2001 RO_{108}	—	September 12, 2001	Socorro	LINEAR	KOR	1.8 km	MPC · JPL
210869	2001 RE_{112}	—	September 12, 2001	Socorro	LINEAR	·	2.3 km	MPC · JPL
210870	2001 RE_{118}	—	September 12, 2001	Socorro	LINEAR	·	3.2 km	MPC · JPL
210871	2001 RY_{124}	—	September 12, 2001	Socorro	LINEAR	·	3.4 km	MPC · JPL
210872	2001 RL_{126}	—	September 12, 2001	Socorro	LINEAR	·	3.0 km	MPC · JPL
210873	2001 RN_{138}	—	September 12, 2001	Socorro	LINEAR	·	2.4 km	MPC · JPL
210874 Perijohnson	2001 RH_{155}	Perijohnson	September 12, 2001	Kitt Peak	M. W. Buie	·	3.2 km	MPC · JPL
210875	2001 SK_{5}	—	September 16, 2001	Socorro	LINEAR	·	2.8 km	MPC · JPL
210876	2001 SY_{13}	—	September 16, 2001	Socorro	LINEAR	·	2.5 km	MPC · JPL
210877	2001 SR_{14}	—	September 16, 2001	Socorro	LINEAR	NAE	5.2 km	MPC · JPL
210878	2001 SH_{32}	—	September 16, 2001	Socorro	LINEAR	·	3.6 km	MPC · JPL
210879	2001 ST_{38}	—	September 16, 2001	Socorro	LINEAR	·	3.4 km	MPC · JPL
210880	2001 SH_{51}	—	September 16, 2001	Socorro	LINEAR	·	3.6 km	MPC · JPL
210881	2001 SN_{61}	—	September 17, 2001	Socorro	LINEAR	THM	3.9 km	MPC · JPL
210882	2001 SE_{72}	—	September 17, 2001	Socorro	LINEAR	·	940 m	MPC · JPL
210883	2001 SE_{78}	—	September 19, 2001	Socorro	LINEAR	AGN	1.6 km	MPC · JPL
210884	2001 SF_{82}	—	September 20, 2001	Socorro	LINEAR	AGN	1.8 km	MPC · JPL
210885	2001 SO_{86}	—	September 20, 2001	Socorro	LINEAR	·	2.4 km	MPC · JPL
210886	2001 SO_{87}	—	September 20, 2001	Socorro	LINEAR	·	3.1 km	MPC · JPL
210887	2001 SL_{93}	—	September 20, 2001	Socorro	LINEAR	EOS	1.9 km	MPC · JPL
210888	2001 SA_{94}	—	September 20, 2001	Socorro	LINEAR	·	3.0 km	MPC · JPL
210889	2001 SR_{105}	—	September 20, 2001	Socorro	LINEAR	·	1.7 km	MPC · JPL
210890	2001 SN_{126}	—	September 16, 2001	Socorro	LINEAR	EOS	2.4 km	MPC · JPL
210891	2001 SV_{128}	—	September 16, 2001	Socorro	LINEAR	·	3.7 km	MPC · JPL
210892	2001 ST_{132}	—	September 16, 2001	Socorro	LINEAR	·	2.5 km	MPC · JPL
210893	2001 SP_{133}	—	September 16, 2001	Socorro	LINEAR	·	2.7 km	MPC · JPL
210894	2001 SZ_{134}	—	September 16, 2001	Socorro	LINEAR	AGN	1.3 km	MPC · JPL
210895	2001 SN_{154}	—	September 17, 2001	Socorro	LINEAR	·	4.3 km	MPC · JPL
210896	2001 SD_{162}	—	September 17, 2001	Socorro	LINEAR	·	7.6 km	MPC · JPL
210897	2001 SB_{166}	—	September 19, 2001	Socorro	LINEAR	·	3.4 km	MPC · JPL
210898	2001 SA_{167}	—	September 19, 2001	Socorro	LINEAR	·	3.0 km	MPC · JPL
210899	2001 SY_{171}	—	September 16, 2001	Socorro	LINEAR	·	2.9 km	MPC · JPL
210900	2001 SL_{177}	—	September 16, 2001	Socorro	LINEAR	·	4.6 km	MPC · JPL

== 210901–211000 ==
back to top

Designation			Discovery			Properties		Ref
Permanent	Provisional	Named after	Date	Site	Discoverer(s)	Category	Diam.	Ref
210901	2001 SY_{189}	—	September 19, 2001	Socorro	LINEAR	HOF	3.3 km	MPC · JPL
210902	2001 SO_{201}	—	September 19, 2001	Socorro	LINEAR	THM	3.3 km	MPC · JPL
210903	2001 SD_{205}	—	September 19, 2001	Socorro	LINEAR	·	2.1 km	MPC · JPL
210904	2001 SR_{218}	—	September 19, 2001	Socorro	LINEAR	·	2.8 km	MPC · JPL
210905	2001 SL_{219}	—	September 19, 2001	Socorro	LINEAR	·	2.9 km	MPC · JPL
210906	2001 SQ_{219}	—	September 19, 2001	Socorro	LINEAR	EMA	4.4 km	MPC · JPL
210907	2001 SG_{220}	—	September 19, 2001	Socorro	LINEAR	·	2.7 km	MPC · JPL
210908	2001 SS_{229}	—	September 19, 2001	Socorro	LINEAR	·	3.0 km	MPC · JPL
210909	2001 SX_{229}	—	September 19, 2001	Socorro	LINEAR	THM	2.9 km	MPC · JPL
210910	2001 SB_{240}	—	September 19, 2001	Socorro	LINEAR	·	2.9 km	MPC · JPL
210911	2001 SJ_{242}	—	September 19, 2001	Socorro	LINEAR	·	3.2 km	MPC · JPL
210912	2001 SR_{243}	—	September 19, 2001	Socorro	LINEAR	·	3.7 km	MPC · JPL
210913	2001 SU_{250}	—	September 19, 2001	Socorro	LINEAR	EUP	4.0 km	MPC · JPL
210914	2001 SS_{251}	—	September 19, 2001	Socorro	LINEAR	·	4.8 km	MPC · JPL
210915	2001 SL_{257}	—	September 19, 2001	Socorro	LINEAR	·	2.2 km	MPC · JPL
210916	2001 SP_{258}	—	September 20, 2001	Socorro	LINEAR	·	2.3 km	MPC · JPL
210917	2001 SE_{263}	—	September 25, 2001	Eskridge	G. Hug	·	2.6 km	MPC · JPL
210918	2001 SP_{273}	—	September 19, 2001	Kitt Peak	Spacewatch	·	2.2 km	MPC · JPL
210919	2001 SS_{301}	—	September 20, 2001	Socorro	LINEAR	·	3.0 km	MPC · JPL
210920	2001 SV_{313}	—	September 21, 2001	Socorro	LINEAR	·	4.4 km	MPC · JPL
210921	2001 SA_{328}	—	September 18, 2001	Anderson Mesa	LONEOS	·	5.0 km	MPC · JPL
210922	2001 SO_{336}	—	September 20, 2001	Socorro	LINEAR	TEL	1.7 km	MPC · JPL
210923	2001 SQ_{336}	—	September 20, 2001	Socorro	LINEAR	·	6.0 km	MPC · JPL
210924	2001 ST_{353}	—	September 25, 2001	Socorro	LINEAR	·	5.6 km	MPC · JPL
210925	2001 TD_{5}	—	October 8, 2001	Palomar	NEAT	·	3.9 km	MPC · JPL
210926	2001 TM_{10}	—	October 13, 2001	Socorro	LINEAR	·	3.3 km	MPC · JPL
210927	2001 TH_{22}	—	October 13, 2001	Socorro	LINEAR	·	2.4 km	MPC · JPL
210928	2001 TN_{29}	—	October 14, 2001	Socorro	LINEAR	fast	2.7 km	MPC · JPL
210929	2001 TP_{74}	—	October 13, 2001	Socorro	LINEAR	·	6.4 km	MPC · JPL
210930	2001 TR_{101}	—	October 15, 2001	Socorro	LINEAR	·	1.0 km	MPC · JPL
210931	2001 TZ_{125}	—	October 12, 2001	Haleakala	NEAT	·	3.6 km	MPC · JPL
210932	2001 TY_{160}	—	October 11, 2001	Palomar	NEAT	·	3.1 km	MPC · JPL
210933	2001 TV_{163}	—	October 11, 2001	Palomar	NEAT	·	2.7 km	MPC · JPL
210934	2001 TX_{172}	—	October 13, 2001	Socorro	LINEAR	·	3.1 km	MPC · JPL
210935	2001 TU_{174}	—	October 15, 2001	Socorro	LINEAR	·	3.3 km	MPC · JPL
210936	2001 TU_{182}	—	October 14, 2001	Socorro	LINEAR	·	3.1 km	MPC · JPL
210937	2001 TH_{184}	—	October 14, 2001	Socorro	LINEAR	·	3.0 km	MPC · JPL
210938	2001 TS_{188}	—	October 14, 2001	Socorro	LINEAR	·	2.7 km	MPC · JPL
210939 Bödök	2001 TR_{197}	Bödök	October 10, 2001	Palomar	NEAT	·	4.0 km	MPC · JPL
210940	2001 TR_{199}	—	October 11, 2001	Socorro	LINEAR	·	2.8 km	MPC · JPL
210941	2001 TF_{205}	—	October 11, 2001	Socorro	LINEAR	·	5.0 km	MPC · JPL
210942	2001 TT_{209}	—	October 12, 2001	Campo Imperatore	CINEOS	·	3.7 km	MPC · JPL
210943	2001 TJ_{228}	—	October 15, 2001	Socorro	LINEAR	EUP	6.1 km	MPC · JPL
210944	2001 TO_{230}	—	October 15, 2001	Socorro	LINEAR	·	5.9 km	MPC · JPL
210945	2001 TC_{241}	—	October 15, 2001	Socorro	LINEAR	·	5.6 km	MPC · JPL
210946	2001 TL_{241}	—	October 10, 2001	Kitt Peak	Spacewatch	EOS	2.7 km	MPC · JPL
210947	2001 TE_{256}	—	October 11, 2001	Socorro	LINEAR	EOS	3.5 km	MPC · JPL
210948	2001 UP_{21}	—	October 17, 2001	Socorro	LINEAR	·	3.4 km	MPC · JPL
210949	2001 UT_{26}	—	October 17, 2001	Kitt Peak	Spacewatch	·	2.6 km	MPC · JPL
210950	2001 UK_{43}	—	October 17, 2001	Socorro	LINEAR	·	4.4 km	MPC · JPL
210951	2001 UE_{45}	—	October 17, 2001	Socorro	LINEAR	·	770 m	MPC · JPL
210952	2001 UR_{45}	—	October 17, 2001	Socorro	LINEAR	·	7.4 km	MPC · JPL
210953	2001 UQ_{46}	—	October 17, 2001	Socorro	LINEAR	·	2.7 km	MPC · JPL
210954	2001 UM_{60}	—	October 17, 2001	Socorro	LINEAR	HOF	3.4 km	MPC · JPL
210955	2001 UU_{80}	—	October 20, 2001	Socorro	LINEAR	HYG	3.7 km	MPC · JPL
210956	2001 UG_{92}	—	October 18, 2001	Palomar	NEAT	·	4.9 km	MPC · JPL
210957	2001 UM_{102}	—	October 20, 2001	Socorro	LINEAR	·	2.4 km	MPC · JPL
210958	2001 UL_{104}	—	October 20, 2001	Socorro	LINEAR	·	2.6 km	MPC · JPL
210959	2001 UD_{128}	—	October 18, 2001	Socorro	LINEAR	·	2.6 km	MPC · JPL
210960	2001 UG_{128}	—	October 18, 2001	Socorro	LINEAR	·	3.1 km	MPC · JPL
210961	2001 UD_{140}	—	October 23, 2001	Socorro	LINEAR	KOR	2.0 km	MPC · JPL
210962	2001 UZ_{140}	—	October 23, 2001	Socorro	LINEAR	·	920 m	MPC · JPL
210963	2001 UT_{158}	—	October 23, 2001	Socorro	LINEAR	·	3.4 km	MPC · JPL
210964	2001 UK_{164}	—	October 18, 2001	Palomar	NEAT	·	5.1 km	MPC · JPL
210965	2001 UL_{179}	—	October 26, 2001	Palomar	NEAT	·	3.2 km	MPC · JPL
210966	2001 UJ_{191}	—	October 18, 2001	Palomar	NEAT	·	2.8 km	MPC · JPL
210967	2001 UQ_{208}	—	October 20, 2001	Kitt Peak	Spacewatch	·	2.6 km	MPC · JPL
210968	2001 UP_{210}	—	October 21, 2001	Socorro	LINEAR	·	4.1 km	MPC · JPL
210969	2001 VH	—	November 5, 2001	Needville	J. Dellinger, A. Cruz	·	840 m	MPC · JPL
210970	2001 VP_{7}	—	November 9, 2001	Socorro	LINEAR	MAS	1.1 km	MPC · JPL
210971	2001 VS_{7}	—	November 9, 2001	Socorro	LINEAR	·	970 m	MPC · JPL
210972	2001 VN_{58}	—	November 10, 2001	Socorro	LINEAR	·	3.9 km	MPC · JPL
210973	2001 VZ_{59}	—	November 10, 2001	Socorro	LINEAR	·	4.5 km	MPC · JPL
210974	2001 VZ_{60}	—	November 10, 2001	Socorro	LINEAR	TIR	3.8 km	MPC · JPL
210975	2001 VE_{61}	—	November 10, 2001	Socorro	LINEAR	DOR	4.0 km	MPC · JPL
210976	2001 VK_{68}	—	November 11, 2001	Socorro	LINEAR	·	5.3 km	MPC · JPL
210977	2001 VV_{83}	—	November 10, 2001	Socorro	LINEAR	·	3.7 km	MPC · JPL
210978	2001 VW_{83}	—	November 10, 2001	Socorro	LINEAR	·	4.5 km	MPC · JPL
210979	2001 VG_{86}	—	November 12, 2001	Socorro	LINEAR	VER	3.7 km	MPC · JPL
210980	2001 VP_{107}	—	November 12, 2001	Socorro	LINEAR	·	5.5 km	MPC · JPL
210981	2001 VW_{109}	—	November 12, 2001	Socorro	LINEAR	·	1.2 km	MPC · JPL
210982	2001 VZ_{125}	—	November 14, 2001	Kitt Peak	Spacewatch	HYG	3.3 km	MPC · JPL
210983 Wadeparker	2001 VM_{131}	Wadeparker	November 11, 2001	Apache Point	SDSS	·	4.9 km	MPC · JPL
210984	2001 WM	—	November 16, 2001	Kitt Peak	Spacewatch	·	3.3 km	MPC · JPL
210985	2001 WE_{42}	—	November 18, 2001	Socorro	LINEAR	EOS	2.7 km	MPC · JPL
210986	2001 WZ_{53}	—	November 19, 2001	Socorro	LINEAR	·	2.8 km	MPC · JPL
210987	2001 WM_{57}	—	November 19, 2001	Socorro	LINEAR	DOR	3.3 km	MPC · JPL
210988	2001 WP_{57}	—	November 19, 2001	Socorro	LINEAR	EOS	2.5 km	MPC · JPL
210989	2001 WP_{63}	—	November 19, 2001	Socorro	LINEAR	EOS	3.2 km	MPC · JPL
210990	2001 WN_{77}	—	November 20, 2001	Socorro	LINEAR	EOS	2.1 km	MPC · JPL
210991	2001 WK_{90}	—	November 21, 2001	Socorro	LINEAR	ARM	6.3 km	MPC · JPL
210992	2001 WY_{92}	—	November 21, 2001	Socorro	LINEAR	·	6.0 km	MPC · JPL
210993	2001 XH_{8}	—	December 9, 2001	Socorro	LINEAR	·	5.4 km	MPC · JPL
210994	2001 XV_{8}	—	December 9, 2001	Socorro	LINEAR	HYG	3.4 km	MPC · JPL
210995	2001 XB_{10}	—	December 9, 2001	Socorro	LINEAR	·	980 m	MPC · JPL
210996	2001 XY_{19}	—	December 9, 2001	Socorro	LINEAR	·	1.2 km	MPC · JPL
210997 Guenat	2001 XA_{32}	Guenat	December 14, 2001	Vicques	M. Ory	·	1.9 km	MPC · JPL
210998	2001 XF_{46}	—	December 9, 2001	Socorro	LINEAR	·	1.5 km	MPC · JPL
210999	2001 XR_{49}	—	December 10, 2001	Socorro	LINEAR	·	4.4 km	MPC · JPL
211000	2001 XF_{121}	—	December 14, 2001	Socorro	LINEAR	·	4.0 km	MPC · JPL

back to top

== See also ==
- Meanings of minor-planet names: 210001–211000
