= Meanings of minor-planet names: 210001–211000 =

As minor planet discoveries are confirmed, they are given a permanent number by the IAU's Minor Planet Center (MPC), and the discoverers can then submit names for them, following the IAU's naming conventions. The list below concerns those minor planets in the specified number-range that have received names, and explains the meanings of those names.

Official naming citations of newly named small Solar System bodies are approved and published in a bulletin by IAU's Working Group for Small Bodies Nomenclature (WGSBN). Before May 2021, citations were published in MPC's Minor Planet Circulars for many decades. Recent citations can also be found on the JPL Small-Body Database (SBDB). Until his death in 2016, German astronomer Lutz D. Schmadel compiled these citations into the Dictionary of Minor Planet Names (DMP) and regularly updated the collection.

Based on Paul Herget's The Names of the Minor Planets, Schmadel also researched the unclear origin of numerous asteroids, most of which had been named prior to World War II. This article incorporates text from this source, which is in the public domain: SBDB New namings may only be added to this list below after official publication as the preannouncement of names is condemned. The WGSBN publishes a comprehensive guideline for the naming rules of non-cometary small Solar System bodies.

== 210001–210100 ==
Named minor planet	Provisional	This minor planet was named for...	Ref · Catalog
210030 Taoyuan	2006 MF_{13}	Taoyuan City, the gateway to Taiwan because of its demographic diversity and Taoyuan International Airport.	JPL · 210030
210031 Grupamocarta	2006 MP_{14}	Grupa MoCarta (MozART Group), Polish string quartet founded in 1995 that combines classical music with comedy and theatrical performance.	IAU · 210031
210032 Enricocastellani	2006 OC	Enrico Castellani (born 1930) is an Italian painter, considered one of the most important figures of mid-twentieth century European art. His works are among the most sought after and expensive of the period.	JPL · 210032
210035 Jungli	2006 OG_{5}	Zhongli District, located in the Taoyuan City, in the north-western part of Taiwan.	JPL · 210035
210070 Robertcapa	2006 QK_{11}	Robert Capa (1913–1954), born Endre Ernő Friedmann, a Hungarian-American war photographer and photojournalist.	IAU · 210070

== 210101–210200 ==
back to top

Named minor planet	Provisional	This minor planet was named for...	Ref · Catalog
210107 Pistoletto	2006 QF_{137}	Michelangelo Pistoletto (born 1933) is an Italian painter and sculptor, and a significant representative of the Italian trend of the Arte Povera.	JPL · 210107
210147 Žalgiris	2006 SU_{77}	The Battle of Žalgiris (Grunwald or Battle of Tannenberg) took place in 1410 with the Grand Duchy of Lithuania and the Kingdom of Poland raging against the Knights of the Teutonic Order.	JPL · 210147
210174 Vossenkuhl	2006 US	Wilhelm Vossenkuhl (born 1945), German philosopher known for his TV-discussions with astronomer Harald Lesch	JPL · 210174
210182 Mazzini	2006 UE_{215}	Giuseppe Mazzini (1805–1872), nicknamed "Soul of Italy", Italian activist for the unification of Italy.	JPL · 210182

== 210201–210300 ==
back to top

Named minor planet	Provisional	This minor planet was named for...	Ref · Catalog
210210 Songjian	2007 QS_{12}	Song Jian (born 1931), an academician of the Chinese Academy of Sciences and an academician of Chinese Academy of Engineering	JPL · 210210
210213 Hasler-Gloor	2007 RP_{14}	Niklaus Gloor (born 1940) and his wife Ursula Hasler–Gloor (born 1940), two Swiss amateur astronomers and founders of the Astronomical Society of Winterthur in Switzerland	JPL · 210213
210230 Linyuanpei	2007 RF_{119}	Lin Yuanpei (born 1936), an academician of the Chinese Academy of Engineering	JPL · 210230
210231 Wangdemin	2007 RH_{119}	Wang Demin (born 1937), an academician of the Chinese Academy of Engineering, is the founder of Separate Zone Production Technology and Chemical Flooding Technology in China.	JPL · 210231
210232 Zhangjinqiu	2007 RV_{119}	Zhang Jinqiu (born 1936), an architect and an academician of the Chinese Academy of Engineering	JPL · 210232
210245 Castets	2007 RG_{216}	Martine Castets (born 1949), a French amateur astronomer	JPL · 210245
210271 Samarkand	2007 TU_{2}	Samarkand, the ancient city in Uzbekistan which is most noted for its central position on the Silk Road.	JPL · 210271
210290 Borsellino	2007 TE_{69}	Paolo Borsellino (1940–1992) was an Italian magistrate who played a very active role against organized crime.	JPL · 210290
210292 Mayongsheng	2007 TW_{79}	Ma Yongsheng (born 1961), an academician of the Chinese Academy of Engineering, is the founder of the Deep Buried Marine Carbonate Gas Reservoir Model, and the first to discover the Puguang gas field and Yuanba gas field in China.	JPL · 210292
210294 Vidal	2007 TT_{92}	José Ramón Vidal Blanco, one of the founders of the Sociedad Astronómica Asturiana Omega, and director of the Observatorio Municipal Monte Deva in Gijón, Asturias.	IAU · 210294

== 210301–210400 ==
back to top

Named minor planet	Provisional	This minor planet was named for...	Ref · Catalog
210345 Barbon	2007 UQ	Roberto Barbon (born 1938) is an Italian astronomer at the Asiago Astrophysical Observatory and a senior scholar at UNIPD, as well as a member of the International Astronomical Union and its "Division J Galaxies and Cosmology". His research includes supernovae and open clusters (Src).	IAU · 210345
210350 Mariolisa	2007 UA_{7}	Mario (born 2005) and Lisa (born 2002), the children of the Italian discoverer Fabrizio Tozzi	JPL · 210350

== 210401–210500 ==
back to top

Named minor planet	Provisional	This minor planet was named for...	Ref · Catalog
210414 Gebartolomei	2007 XT_{4}	Geronimo Bartolomei (born 1972), student of physics at the University of Pisa and is working at the Astronomical Observatory of San Marcello.	JPL · 210414
210421 Freundtamás	2007 YD_{3}	Hungarian neurobiologist Tamás Freund (born 1959) has been involved for over 30 years in functional anatomical studies on cortical microcircuits, employing combinations of immunocytochemistry, electron microscopy, and electrophysiology. He is an active science communicator.	JPL · 210421
210425 Imogene	2008 AM_{31}	Imogene Powers Johnson (born 1930), a naturalist and amateur astronomer.	JPL · 210425
210432 Dietmarhopp	2008 XA_{7}	Dietmar Hopp (born 1940), German entrepreneur and founder of the non-profit Dietmar Hopp Stiftung	JPL · 210432
210433 Ullithiele	2008 YT_{1}	Ulrich Thiele (born 1952), head of Calar Alto Observatory in 1988.	JPL · 210433
210434 Fungyuancheng	2008 YH_{14}	Yuan-Cheng Fung (1919–), known as the Father of Modern Biomechanics, is the author of the famous Fung's Law.	JPL · 210434
210435 Pollackmihály	2008 YD_{26}	Mihály Pollack (1773–1855), an Austrian-born Hungarian architect and a key figure of neoclassical architecture.	IAU · 210435
210444 Frithjof	2009 BX	Frithjof Brauer (born 1980), developed in his Ph.D. thesis the principles of dust coagulation and formation of planets beyond the meter size barrier.	JPL · 210444

== 210501–210600 ==
back to top

Named minor planet	Provisional	This minor planet was named for...	Ref · Catalog
210532 Grantmckee	1999 FA_{74}	Grant McKee (1992–2013), one of the 19 elite Prescott's Granite Mountain Hotshot firefighters who lost their lives battling a blaze on a ridge in Yarnell, Arizona, United States	JPL · 210532
210533 Seanmisner	1999 FE_{74}	Sean Misner (1987–2013), one of the 19 elite Prescott's Granite Mountain Hotshot firefighters who lost their lives battling a blaze on a ridge in Yarnell, Arizona, United States	JPL · 210533

== 210601–210700 ==
back to top

Named minor planet	Provisional	This minor planet was named for...	Ref · Catalog
210686 Scottnorris	2000 RR_{107}	Scott Norris (1985–2013), one of the 19 elite Prescott's Granite Mountain Hotshot firefighters who lost their lives battling a blaze on a ridge in Yarnell, Arizona, United States	JPL · 210686

== 210701–210800 ==
back to top

Named minor planet	Provisional	This minor planet was named for...	Ref · Catalog
There are no named minor planets in this number range

== 210801–210900 ==
back to top

Named minor planet	Provisional	This minor planet was named for...	Ref · Catalog
210854 Stevejaskulek	2001 QE_{317}	Stephen E. Jaskulek (b. 1957), an American senior systems engineer at the Johns Hopkins University Applied Physics Laboratory.	IAU · 210854
210874 Perijohnson	2001 RH_{155}	Perianne E. Johnson (b. 1994), an American planetary scientist.	IAU · 210874

== 210901–211000 ==
back to top

Named minor planet	Provisional	This minor planet was named for...	Ref · Catalog
210939 Bödök	2001 TR_{197}	Zsigmond Bödök (1957–2010), Slovak astronomer	JPL · 210939
210983 Wadeparker	2001 VM_{131}	Wade Parker (1991–2013), one of the 19 elite Prescott's Granite Mountain Hotshot firefighters who lost their lives battling a blaze on a ridge in Yarnell, Arizona, United States	JPL · 210983
210997 Guenat	2001 XA_{32}	François Guenat (born 1937), the first curator of the Jura natural science museum in Porrentruy, Switzerland	JPL · 210997

back to top

Preceded by 209,001–210,000	Meanings of minor-planet names List of minor planets: 210,001–211,000	Succeeded by 211,001–212,000
