= Meanings of minor-planet names: 209001–210000 =

As minor planet discoveries are confirmed, they are given a permanent number by the IAU's Minor Planet Center (MPC), and the discoverers can then submit names for them, following the IAU's naming conventions. The list below concerns those minor planets in the specified number-range that have received names, and explains the meanings of those names.

Official naming citations of newly named small Solar System bodies are approved and published in a bulletin by IAU's Working Group for Small Bodies Nomenclature (WGSBN). Before May 2021, citations were published in MPC's Minor Planet Circulars for many decades. Recent citations can also be found on the JPL Small-Body Database (SBDB). Until his death in 2016, German astronomer Lutz D. Schmadel compiled these citations into the Dictionary of Minor Planet Names (DMP) and regularly updated the collection.

Based on Paul Herget's The Names of the Minor Planets, Schmadel also researched the unclear origin of numerous asteroids, most of which had been named prior to World War II. This article incorporates text from this source, which is in the public domain: SBDB New namings may only be added to this list below after official publication as the preannouncement of names is condemned. The WGSBN publishes a comprehensive guideline for the naming rules of non-cometary small Solar System bodies.

== 209001–209100 ==
Named minor planet	Provisional	This minor planet was named for...	Ref · Catalog
209054 Lombkató	2003 QR_{29}	Kató Lomb (1909–2003), a Hungarian interpreter, translator and one of the first simultaneous interpreters in the world	JPL · 209054
209075 Kathleenharmon	2003 QM_{114}	Kathleen A. Harmon (b. 1968), an American systems engineer for at the Jet Propulsion Laboratory.	IAU · 209075
209083 Rioja	2003 SN_{15}	Rioja is a wine made from grapes grown in the autonomous community of La Rioja and in parts of Navarre and the Basque province of Álava.	JPL · 209083
209089 Csépevaléria	2003 SH_{33}	Valéria Csépe (b. 1951), a Hungarian psychologist, university professor, and a full member of the Hungarian Academy of Sciences.	IAU · 209089

== 209101–209200 ==
back to top

Named minor planet	Provisional	This minor planet was named for...	Ref · Catalog
209107 Šafránek	2003 SF_{119}	Jaroslav Šafránek (1890–1957), a Czech experimental physicist	JPL · 209107
209148 Dustindeford	2003 SE_{322}	Dustin DeFord (1989–2013), one of the 19 Granite Mountain Hotshots who lost their lives fighting the 2013 Yarnell Hill Fire in Arizona	JPL · 209148
209149 Chrismackenzie	2003 SF_{421}	Christopher MacKenzie (1983–2013), one of the 19 Granite Mountain Hotshots who lost their lives fighting the 2013 Yarnell Hill Fire in Arizona	JPL · 209149

== 209201–209300 ==
back to top

Named minor planet	Provisional	This minor planet was named for...	Ref · Catalog
209206 Richardhenry	2003 UQ_{288}	Richard Conn Henry (b. 1940), an American Academy Professor at the Johns Hopkins University specializing in far ultra-violet observations.	IAU · 209206
209209 Ericmarsh	2003 UB_{353}	Eric Marsh (1970–2013), one of the 19 Granite Mountain Hotshots who lost their lives fighting the 2013 Yarnell Hill Fire in Arizona	JPL · 209209
209255 Myotragus	2003 WR_{152}	Myotragus is an extinct genus of artiodactyl mammal of the subfamily Caprinae, which inhabited the islands of Mallorca, Menorca, Cabrera and Dragonera until its extinction about 5000 years ago.	IAU · 209255

== 209301–209400 ==
back to top

Named minor planet	Provisional	This minor planet was named for...	Ref · Catalog
209374 Sabil	2004 EC_{22}	Mohammed Sabil (b. 1976), a researcher in the department of physics at the Sultan Moulay Slimane University, Morocco	IAU · 209374

== 209401–209500 ==
back to top

Named minor planet	Provisional	This minor planet was named for...	Ref · Catalog
There are no named minor planets in this number range

== 209501–209600 ==
back to top

Named minor planet	Provisional	This minor planet was named for...	Ref · Catalog
209540 Siurana	2004 UK_{1}	The village of Siurana, at the top of an escarpment in the Prades Mountains in the Montsant region of Catalonia	JPL · 209540
209552 Isaacroberts	2004 VZ_{63}	Isaac Roberts (1829–1904), amateur astronomer and pioneer in astrophotography	JPL · 209552

== 209601–209700 ==
back to top

Named minor planet	Provisional	This minor planet was named for...	Ref · Catalog
There are no named minor planets in this number range

== 209701–209800 ==
back to top

Named minor planet	Provisional	This minor planet was named for...	Ref · Catalog
209791 Tokaj	2005 GU_{21}	Tokaj, a historic town in northern Hungary	JPL · 209791

== 209801–209900 ==
back to top

Named minor planet	Provisional	This minor planet was named for...	Ref · Catalog
209883 Jasonhofgartner	2005 JZ_{170}	Jason D. Hofgartner (b. 1988), a Canadian planetary scientist.	IAU · 209883

== 209901–210000 ==
back to top

Named minor planet	Provisional	This minor planet was named for...	Ref · Catalog
There are no named minor planets in this number range

back to top

Preceded by 208,001–209,000	Meanings of minor-planet names List of minor planets: 209,001–210,000	Succeeded by 210,001–211,000
