= List of minor planets: 209001–210000 =

The following is a partial list of minor planets, running from minor-planet number 209001 through 210000, inclusive. The primary data for this and other partial lists is based on JPL's "Small-Body Orbital Elements" and data available from the Minor Planet Center. Critical list information is also provided by the MPC, unless otherwise specified from Lowell Observatory. A detailed description of the table's columns and additional sources are given on the main page including a complete list of every page in this series, and a statistical break-up on the dynamical classification of minor planets.

Also see the summary list of all named bodies in numerical and alphabetical order, and the corresponding naming citations for the number range of this particular list. New namings may only be added to this list after official publication, as the preannouncement of names is condemned by the Working Group for Small Bodies Nomenclature of the International Astronomical Union.

Near-Earth obj.	MBA (inner)	MBA (outer)	Centaur
Mars-crosser	MBA (middle)	Jupiter trojan	Trans-Neptunian obj.
Unclassified

== 209001–209100 ==
Designation			Discovery			Properties		Ref
Permanent	Provisional	Named after	Date	Site	Discoverer(s)	Category	Diam.	Ref
209001	2003 BD_{10}	—	January 26, 2003	Palomar	NEAT	·	2.9 km	MPC · JPL
209002	2003 BL_{14}	—	January 26, 2003	Haleakala	NEAT	·	7.3 km	MPC · JPL
209003	2003 BQ_{20}	—	January 27, 2003	Socorro	LINEAR	·	5.2 km	MPC · JPL
209004	2003 BF_{26}	—	January 26, 2003	Anderson Mesa	LONEOS	·	5.7 km	MPC · JPL
209005	2003 BO_{26}	—	January 26, 2003	Haleakala	NEAT	·	3.7 km	MPC · JPL
209006	2003 BM_{40}	—	January 27, 2003	Haleakala	NEAT	TIR	4.4 km	MPC · JPL
209007	2003 BO_{48}	—	January 26, 2003	Kitt Peak	Spacewatch	·	5.1 km	MPC · JPL
209008	2003 BG_{53}	—	January 27, 2003	Socorro	LINEAR	·	3.9 km	MPC · JPL
209009	2003 BB_{58}	—	January 27, 2003	Socorro	LINEAR	·	4.2 km	MPC · JPL
209010	2003 BE_{66}	—	January 30, 2003	Anderson Mesa	LONEOS	EUP	7.0 km	MPC · JPL
209011	2003 BO_{73}	—	January 29, 2003	Palomar	NEAT	·	4.3 km	MPC · JPL
209012	2003 BX_{76}	—	January 29, 2003	Palomar	NEAT	·	5.4 km	MPC · JPL
209013	2003 BB_{87}	—	January 26, 2003	Kitt Peak	Spacewatch	·	4.2 km	MPC · JPL
209014	2003 BY_{91}	—	January 24, 2003	Palomar	NEAT	·	5.5 km	MPC · JPL
209015	2003 CT_{13}	—	February 4, 2003	Palomar	NEAT	·	6.8 km	MPC · JPL
209016	2003 CA_{19}	—	February 8, 2003	Anderson Mesa	LONEOS	·	7.0 km	MPC · JPL
209017	2003 DQ	—	February 20, 2003	Haleakala	NEAT	·	4.8 km	MPC · JPL
209018	2003 DM_{8}	—	February 22, 2003	Palomar	NEAT	·	4.5 km	MPC · JPL
209019	2003 DF_{21}	—	February 23, 2003	Anderson Mesa	LONEOS	·	4.2 km	MPC · JPL
209020	2003 EM_{13}	—	March 6, 2003	Palomar	NEAT	·	4.8 km	MPC · JPL
209021	2003 EE_{14}	—	March 7, 2003	Palomar	NEAT	·	4.5 km	MPC · JPL
209022	2003 ED_{15}	—	March 7, 2003	Palomar	NEAT	·	5.8 km	MPC · JPL
209023	2003 EG_{36}	—	March 7, 2003	Anderson Mesa	LONEOS	·	4.8 km	MPC · JPL
209024	2003 EB_{48}	—	March 9, 2003	Anderson Mesa	LONEOS	·	4.8 km	MPC · JPL
209025	2003 EZ_{55}	—	March 11, 2003	Kitt Peak	Spacewatch	CYB	7.7 km	MPC · JPL
209026	2003 FQ_{21}	—	March 25, 2003	Kitt Peak	Spacewatch	·	3.5 km	MPC · JPL
209027	2003 FZ_{24}	—	March 24, 2003	Kitt Peak	Spacewatch	·	4.4 km	MPC · JPL
209028	2003 FM_{115}	—	March 31, 2003	Socorro	LINEAR	T_{j} (2.99)	7.3 km	MPC · JPL
209029	2003 GM_{14}	—	April 2, 2003	Palomar	NEAT	LUT	6.7 km	MPC · JPL
209030	2003 HL_{16}	—	April 25, 2003	Anderson Mesa	LONEOS	·	1.1 km	MPC · JPL
209031	2003 HS_{19}	—	April 26, 2003	Kitt Peak	Spacewatch	3:2	7.7 km	MPC · JPL
209032	2003 HH_{51}	—	April 29, 2003	Kitt Peak	Spacewatch	·	910 m	MPC · JPL
209033	2003 JU_{6}	—	May 1, 2003	Kitt Peak	Spacewatch	·	1.2 km	MPC · JPL
209034	2003 KB_{30}	—	May 25, 2003	Kitt Peak	Spacewatch	·	930 m	MPC · JPL
209035	2003 NJ_{1}	—	July 2, 2003	Reedy Creek	J. Broughton	·	2.3 km	MPC · JPL
209036	2003 NC_{12}	—	July 3, 2003	Kitt Peak	Spacewatch	·	930 m	MPC · JPL
209037	2003 OZ_{3}	—	July 22, 2003	Campo Imperatore	CINEOS	MAS	1.2 km	MPC · JPL
209038	2003 OB_{5}	—	July 22, 2003	Haleakala	NEAT	·	2.1 km	MPC · JPL
209039	2003 OH_{10}	—	July 25, 2003	Socorro	LINEAR	NYS	1.5 km	MPC · JPL
209040	2003 OD_{13}	—	July 25, 2003	Socorro	LINEAR	NYS	1.7 km	MPC · JPL
209041	2003 OV_{17}	—	July 29, 2003	Reedy Creek	J. Broughton	·	1.0 km	MPC · JPL
209042	2003 OR_{18}	—	July 25, 2003	Palomar	NEAT	PHO	4.2 km	MPC · JPL
209043	2003 OM_{20}	—	July 30, 2003	Campo Imperatore	CINEOS	·	1.5 km	MPC · JPL
209044	2003 PL_{2}	—	August 2, 2003	Haleakala	NEAT	·	970 m	MPC · JPL
209045	2003 PH_{4}	—	August 2, 2003	Reedy Creek	J. Broughton	·	3.6 km	MPC · JPL
209046	2003 QP	—	August 18, 2003	Campo Imperatore	CINEOS	·	890 m	MPC · JPL
209047	2003 QV_{1}	—	August 19, 2003	Campo Imperatore	CINEOS	·	1.4 km	MPC · JPL
209048	2003 QY_{5}	—	August 19, 2003	Campo Imperatore	CINEOS	·	1.7 km	MPC · JPL
209049	2003 QW_{9}	—	August 20, 2003	Reedy Creek	J. Broughton	·	1.6 km	MPC · JPL
209050	2003 QA_{11}	—	August 20, 2003	Haleakala	NEAT	·	2.5 km	MPC · JPL
209051	2003 QE_{11}	—	August 20, 2003	Campo Imperatore	CINEOS	·	1.8 km	MPC · JPL
209052	2003 QA_{21}	—	August 22, 2003	Palomar	NEAT	·	1.2 km	MPC · JPL
209053	2003 QC_{24}	—	August 21, 2003	Palomar	NEAT	·	1.2 km	MPC · JPL
209054 Lombkató	2003 QR_{29}	Lombkató	August 23, 2003	Piszkéstető	K. Sárneczky, B. Sipőcz	·	940 m	MPC · JPL
209055	2003 QE_{34}	—	August 22, 2003	Palomar	NEAT	·	1.7 km	MPC · JPL
209056	2003 QT_{36}	—	August 22, 2003	Socorro	LINEAR	NYS	1.6 km	MPC · JPL
209057	2003 QL_{38}	—	August 22, 2003	Socorro	LINEAR	MAS	1.1 km	MPC · JPL
209058	2003 QL_{39}	—	August 22, 2003	Socorro	LINEAR	·	1.4 km	MPC · JPL
209059	2003 QR_{44}	—	August 23, 2003	Palomar	NEAT	NYS	1.5 km	MPC · JPL
209060	2003 QU_{50}	—	August 22, 2003	Palomar	NEAT	V	1.3 km	MPC · JPL
209061	2003 QX_{50}	—	August 22, 2003	Palomar	NEAT	NYS	1.3 km	MPC · JPL
209062	2003 QJ_{61}	—	August 23, 2003	Socorro	LINEAR	·	1.9 km	MPC · JPL
209063	2003 QT_{61}	—	August 23, 2003	Socorro	LINEAR	·	1.3 km	MPC · JPL
209064	2003 QT_{65}	—	August 25, 2003	Palomar	NEAT	·	1.5 km	MPC · JPL
209065	2003 QR_{66}	—	August 22, 2003	Socorro	LINEAR	·	1.6 km	MPC · JPL
209066	2003 QU_{69}	—	August 26, 2003	Kleť	Kleť	·	1.8 km	MPC · JPL
209067	2003 QW_{86}	—	August 25, 2003	Socorro	LINEAR	NYS	1.7 km	MPC · JPL
209068	2003 QF_{87}	—	August 25, 2003	Socorro	LINEAR	·	1.6 km	MPC · JPL
209069	2003 QX_{87}	—	August 25, 2003	Socorro	LINEAR	·	1.4 km	MPC · JPL
209070	2003 QS_{99}	—	August 28, 2003	Socorro	LINEAR	V	920 m	MPC · JPL
209071	2003 QM_{101}	—	August 29, 2003	Socorro	LINEAR	·	1.3 km	MPC · JPL
209072	2003 QJ_{102}	—	August 31, 2003	Kitt Peak	Spacewatch	·	2.0 km	MPC · JPL
209073	2003 QQ_{106}	—	August 31, 2003	Kitt Peak	Spacewatch	·	1.8 km	MPC · JPL
209074	2003 QF_{114}	—	August 25, 2003	Socorro	LINEAR	·	2.3 km	MPC · JPL
209075 Kathleenharmon	2003 QM_{114}	Kathleenharmon	August 23, 2003	Cerro Tololo	M. W. Buie	EUN	1.7 km	MPC · JPL
209076	2003 RX_{15}	—	September 14, 2003	Haleakala	NEAT	V	930 m	MPC · JPL
209077	2003 RJ_{21}	—	September 15, 2003	Anderson Mesa	LONEOS	NYS ·	2.6 km	MPC · JPL
209078	2003 SW_{3}	—	September 16, 2003	Kitt Peak	Spacewatch	V	1.1 km	MPC · JPL
209079	2003 SZ_{10}	—	September 17, 2003	Kitt Peak	Spacewatch	·	1.7 km	MPC · JPL
209080	2003 SS_{11}	—	September 16, 2003	Kitt Peak	Spacewatch	·	1.6 km	MPC · JPL
209081	2003 SN_{14}	—	September 17, 2003	Kitt Peak	Spacewatch	·	1.6 km	MPC · JPL
209082	2003 SD_{15}	—	September 17, 2003	Kitt Peak	Spacewatch	V	850 m	MPC · JPL
209083 Rioja	2003 SN_{15}	Rioja	September 17, 2003	Heppenheim	F. Hormuth	·	2.2 km	MPC · JPL
209084	2003 SJ_{26}	—	September 17, 2003	Haleakala	NEAT	·	2.1 km	MPC · JPL
209085	2003 SS_{26}	—	September 17, 2003	Haleakala	NEAT	·	1.7 km	MPC · JPL
209086	2003 SW_{27}	—	September 18, 2003	Palomar	NEAT	·	1.6 km	MPC · JPL
209087	2003 SR_{30}	—	September 18, 2003	Kitt Peak	Spacewatch	(5)	1.3 km	MPC · JPL
209088	2003 SE_{31}	—	September 18, 2003	Kitt Peak	Spacewatch	MAS	880 m	MPC · JPL
209089 Csépevaléria	2003 SH_{33}	Csépevaléria	September 18, 2003	Piszkéstető	K. Sárneczky, B. Sipőcz	V	790 m	MPC · JPL
209090	2003 ST_{33}	—	September 18, 2003	Socorro	LINEAR	·	2.0 km	MPC · JPL
209091	2003 SX_{37}	—	September 16, 2003	Palomar	NEAT	V	750 m	MPC · JPL
209092	2003 ST_{40}	—	September 16, 2003	Palomar	NEAT	·	2.3 km	MPC · JPL
209093	2003 SO_{41}	—	September 17, 2003	Palomar	NEAT	EUN	1.7 km	MPC · JPL
209094	2003 SA_{42}	—	September 17, 2003	Palomar	NEAT	·	2.9 km	MPC · JPL
209095	2003 SW_{45}	—	September 16, 2003	Anderson Mesa	LONEOS	·	2.0 km	MPC · JPL
209096	2003 SW_{49}	—	September 18, 2003	Palomar	NEAT	V	900 m	MPC · JPL
209097	2003 SF_{51}	—	September 18, 2003	Palomar	NEAT	·	2.2 km	MPC · JPL
209098	2003 SR_{54}	—	September 16, 2003	Anderson Mesa	LONEOS	·	1.8 km	MPC · JPL
209099	2003 SM_{55}	—	September 16, 2003	Anderson Mesa	LONEOS	·	1.6 km	MPC · JPL
209100	2003 SV_{57}	—	September 16, 2003	Kitt Peak	Spacewatch	JUN	1.4 km	MPC · JPL

== 209101–209200 ==
back to top

Designation			Discovery			Properties		Ref
Permanent	Provisional	Named after	Date	Site	Discoverer(s)	Category	Diam.	Ref
209101	2003 SV_{67}	—	September 16, 2003	Kitt Peak	Spacewatch	·	1.6 km	MPC · JPL
209102	2003 SZ_{69}	—	September 17, 2003	Kitt Peak	Spacewatch	·	1.3 km	MPC · JPL
209103	2003 SW_{74}	—	September 18, 2003	Kitt Peak	Spacewatch	·	1.6 km	MPC · JPL
209104	2003 SP_{76}	—	September 18, 2003	Kitt Peak	Spacewatch	·	1.1 km	MPC · JPL
209105	2003 SY_{107}	—	September 20, 2003	Palomar	NEAT	·	1.9 km	MPC · JPL
209106	2003 SG_{110}	—	September 20, 2003	Palomar	NEAT	·	1.1 km	MPC · JPL
209107 Šafránek	2003 SF_{119}	Šafránek	September 16, 2003	Kleť	KLENOT	·	1.7 km	MPC · JPL
209108	2003 ST_{119}	—	September 17, 2003	Kitt Peak	Spacewatch	·	2.0 km	MPC · JPL
209109	2003 SY_{119}	—	September 17, 2003	Kitt Peak	Spacewatch	·	1.4 km	MPC · JPL
209110	2003 SW_{129}	—	September 21, 2003	Desert Eagle	W. K. Y. Yeung	·	1.2 km	MPC · JPL
209111	2003 SJ_{131}	—	September 19, 2003	Kitt Peak	Spacewatch	MAS	1.1 km	MPC · JPL
209112	2003 SH_{146}	—	September 20, 2003	Palomar	NEAT	·	2.4 km	MPC · JPL
209113	2003 SG_{156}	—	September 19, 2003	Anderson Mesa	LONEOS	NYS	1.9 km	MPC · JPL
209114	2003 SJ_{157}	—	September 19, 2003	Anderson Mesa	LONEOS	·	1.4 km	MPC · JPL
209115	2003 SN_{164}	—	September 20, 2003	Anderson Mesa	LONEOS	·	1.6 km	MPC · JPL
209116	2003 SS_{168}	—	September 23, 2003	Haleakala	NEAT	(5)	1.9 km	MPC · JPL
209117	2003 SY_{172}	—	September 18, 2003	Socorro	LINEAR	·	2.5 km	MPC · JPL
209118	2003 SN_{174}	—	September 18, 2003	Kitt Peak	Spacewatch	·	1.2 km	MPC · JPL
209119	2003 SM_{175}	—	September 18, 2003	Kitt Peak	Spacewatch	·	1.4 km	MPC · JPL
209120	2003 SF_{178}	—	September 19, 2003	Palomar	NEAT	V	1.3 km	MPC · JPL
209121	2003 SS_{179}	—	September 19, 2003	Socorro	LINEAR	·	1.1 km	MPC · JPL
209122	2003 SU_{179}	—	September 19, 2003	Socorro	LINEAR	·	1.5 km	MPC · JPL
209123	2003 ST_{183}	—	September 21, 2003	Kitt Peak	Spacewatch	·	1.6 km	MPC · JPL
209124	2003 SQ_{185}	—	September 22, 2003	Anderson Mesa	LONEOS	·	1.2 km	MPC · JPL
209125	2003 SK_{192}	—	September 20, 2003	Campo Imperatore	CINEOS	·	2.2 km	MPC · JPL
209126	2003 SS_{200}	—	September 22, 2003	Kitt Peak	Spacewatch	·	1.9 km	MPC · JPL
209127	2003 SR_{204}	—	September 22, 2003	Socorro	LINEAR	·	2.4 km	MPC · JPL
209128	2003 SX_{210}	—	September 23, 2003	Palomar	NEAT	·	1.4 km	MPC · JPL
209129	2003 SS_{221}	—	September 27, 2003	Kitt Peak	Spacewatch	·	1.3 km	MPC · JPL
209130	2003 SQ_{230}	—	September 24, 2003	Palomar	NEAT	·	1.8 km	MPC · JPL
209131	2003 SV_{231}	—	September 24, 2003	Palomar	NEAT	·	1.7 km	MPC · JPL
209132	2003 SD_{236}	—	September 26, 2003	Socorro	LINEAR	·	1.3 km	MPC · JPL
209133	2003 SY_{236}	—	September 26, 2003	Socorro	LINEAR	·	1.3 km	MPC · JPL
209134	2003 SV_{243}	—	September 28, 2003	Kitt Peak	Spacewatch	·	1.4 km	MPC · JPL
209135	2003 SC_{248}	—	September 26, 2003	Socorro	LINEAR	·	1.6 km	MPC · JPL
209136	2003 SD_{250}	—	September 26, 2003	Socorro	LINEAR	NYS	1.9 km	MPC · JPL
209137	2003 SB_{251}	—	September 26, 2003	Socorro	LINEAR	·	1.9 km	MPC · JPL
209138	2003 SZ_{254}	—	September 27, 2003	Kitt Peak	Spacewatch	·	1.5 km	MPC · JPL
209139	2003 SF_{259}	—	September 28, 2003	Kitt Peak	Spacewatch	·	1.6 km	MPC · JPL
209140	2003 SN_{261}	—	September 27, 2003	Socorro	LINEAR	NYS	1.6 km	MPC · JPL
209141	2003 SW_{261}	—	September 27, 2003	Socorro	LINEAR	·	1.9 km	MPC · JPL
209142	2003 SG_{274}	—	September 28, 2003	Anderson Mesa	LONEOS	V	1.1 km	MPC · JPL
209143	2003 SH_{276}	—	September 29, 2003	Kitt Peak	Spacewatch	·	1.5 km	MPC · JPL
209144	2003 SW_{289}	—	September 28, 2003	Anderson Mesa	LONEOS	·	1.9 km	MPC · JPL
209145	2003 SP_{290}	—	September 28, 2003	Kitt Peak	Spacewatch	·	1.1 km	MPC · JPL
209146	2003 SN_{295}	—	September 29, 2003	Anderson Mesa	LONEOS	·	1.2 km	MPC · JPL
209147	2003 SN_{301}	—	September 17, 2003	Palomar	NEAT	·	1.4 km	MPC · JPL
209148 Dustindeford	2003 SE_{322}	Dustindeford	September 27, 2003	Apache Point	SDSS	PHO	1.5 km	MPC · JPL
209149 Chrismackenzie	2003 SF_{421}	Chrismackenzie	September 29, 2003	Apache Point	SDSS	·	930 m	MPC · JPL
209150	2003 TT_{21}	—	October 1, 2003	Anderson Mesa	LONEOS	·	1.8 km	MPC · JPL
209151	2003 TT_{29}	—	October 1, 2003	Kitt Peak	Spacewatch	·	2.2 km	MPC · JPL
209152	2003 TY_{54}	—	October 5, 2003	Kitt Peak	Spacewatch	·	2.9 km	MPC · JPL
209153	2003 UJ_{7}	—	October 16, 2003	Kitt Peak	Spacewatch	·	3.1 km	MPC · JPL
209154	2003 UU_{8}	—	October 17, 2003	Socorro	LINEAR	·	2.3 km	MPC · JPL
209155	2003 UE_{10}	—	October 20, 2003	Emerald Lane	L. Ball	·	2.6 km	MPC · JPL
209156	2003 UO_{10}	—	October 19, 2003	Anderson Mesa	LONEOS	·	3.7 km	MPC · JPL
209157	2003 UN_{16}	—	October 16, 2003	Anderson Mesa	LONEOS	·	2.7 km	MPC · JPL
209158	2003 UJ_{29}	—	October 23, 2003	Kvistaberg	Uppsala-DLR Asteroid Survey	·	1.5 km	MPC · JPL
209159	2003 UF_{50}	—	October 16, 2003	Črni Vrh	Mikuž, H.	·	2.4 km	MPC · JPL
209160	2003 UK_{51}	—	October 18, 2003	Palomar	NEAT	·	1.9 km	MPC · JPL
209161	2003 UR_{53}	—	October 18, 2003	Palomar	NEAT	MAR	1.3 km	MPC · JPL
209162	2003 UK_{56}	—	October 19, 2003	Goodricke-Pigott	R. A. Tucker	·	1.9 km	MPC · JPL
209163	2003 UO_{56}	—	October 22, 2003	Kitt Peak	Spacewatch	MAS	990 m	MPC · JPL
209164	2003 UR_{82}	—	October 19, 2003	Palomar	NEAT	·	2.7 km	MPC · JPL
209165	2003 UC_{86}	—	October 18, 2003	Palomar	NEAT	·	1.5 km	MPC · JPL
209166	2003 UX_{92}	—	October 20, 2003	Palomar	NEAT	·	2.3 km	MPC · JPL
209167	2003 UG_{94}	—	October 18, 2003	Kitt Peak	Spacewatch	MIS	2.2 km	MPC · JPL
209168	2003 UA_{97}	—	October 19, 2003	Kitt Peak	Spacewatch	·	1.7 km	MPC · JPL
209169	2003 US_{97}	—	October 19, 2003	Kitt Peak	Spacewatch	·	2.2 km	MPC · JPL
209170	2003 UU_{100}	—	October 19, 2003	Haleakala	NEAT	NYS	2.9 km	MPC · JPL
209171	2003 UB_{103}	—	October 20, 2003	Kitt Peak	Spacewatch	·	1.8 km	MPC · JPL
209172	2003 UY_{115}	—	October 20, 2003	Palomar	NEAT	·	2.0 km	MPC · JPL
209173	2003 UH_{121}	—	October 18, 2003	Kitt Peak	Spacewatch	·	1.5 km	MPC · JPL
209174	2003 UA_{123}	—	October 19, 2003	Kitt Peak	Spacewatch	EUN	1.8 km	MPC · JPL
209175	2003 UU_{125}	—	October 20, 2003	Kitt Peak	Spacewatch	·	1.5 km	MPC · JPL
209176	2003 UJ_{140}	—	October 16, 2003	Anderson Mesa	LONEOS	·	1.3 km	MPC · JPL
209177	2003 UZ_{144}	—	October 18, 2003	Anderson Mesa	LONEOS	·	2.7 km	MPC · JPL
209178	2003 UA_{150}	—	October 20, 2003	Socorro	LINEAR	·	1.3 km	MPC · JPL
209179	2003 UU_{150}	—	October 21, 2003	Kitt Peak	Spacewatch	·	2.1 km	MPC · JPL
209180	2003 UU_{159}	—	October 20, 2003	Kitt Peak	Spacewatch	·	1.8 km	MPC · JPL
209181	2003 UE_{162}	—	October 21, 2003	Socorro	LINEAR	·	1.8 km	MPC · JPL
209182	2003 UR_{168}	—	October 22, 2003	Socorro	LINEAR	(5)	2.4 km	MPC · JPL
209183	2003 UC_{179}	—	October 21, 2003	Socorro	LINEAR	·	1.6 km	MPC · JPL
209184	2003 UW_{181}	—	October 21, 2003	Palomar	NEAT	·	1.2 km	MPC · JPL
209185	2003 UH_{186}	—	October 22, 2003	Socorro	LINEAR	·	2.6 km	MPC · JPL
209186	2003 UR_{190}	—	October 23, 2003	Anderson Mesa	LONEOS	·	2.0 km	MPC · JPL
209187	2003 US_{195}	—	October 20, 2003	Kitt Peak	Spacewatch	·	2.3 km	MPC · JPL
209188	2003 UW_{200}	—	October 21, 2003	Socorro	LINEAR	·	1.3 km	MPC · JPL
209189	2003 UC_{204}	—	October 21, 2003	Kitt Peak	Spacewatch	·	1.6 km	MPC · JPL
209190	2003 UM_{208}	—	October 22, 2003	Kitt Peak	Spacewatch	·	1.7 km	MPC · JPL
209191	2003 UT_{212}	—	October 23, 2003	Kitt Peak	Spacewatch	·	2.0 km	MPC · JPL
209192	2003 UF_{214}	—	October 24, 2003	Socorro	LINEAR	·	1.4 km	MPC · JPL
209193	2003 UC_{221}	—	October 22, 2003	Kitt Peak	Spacewatch	·	1.9 km	MPC · JPL
209194	2003 UR_{222}	—	October 22, 2003	Socorro	LINEAR	·	5.6 km	MPC · JPL
209195	2003 UD_{231}	—	October 24, 2003	Socorro	LINEAR	·	1.1 km	MPC · JPL
209196	2003 UP_{254}	—	October 24, 2003	Kitt Peak	Spacewatch	MAS	1.1 km	MPC · JPL
209197	2003 UA_{256}	—	October 25, 2003	Socorro	LINEAR	·	3.8 km	MPC · JPL
209198	2003 UO_{256}	—	October 25, 2003	Socorro	LINEAR	·	1.7 km	MPC · JPL
209199	2003 UP_{256}	—	October 25, 2003	Socorro	LINEAR	·	1.6 km	MPC · JPL
209200	2003 UV_{266}	—	October 28, 2003	Socorro	LINEAR	·	2.1 km	MPC · JPL

== 209201–209300 ==
back to top

Designation			Discovery			Properties		Ref
Permanent	Provisional	Named after	Date	Site	Discoverer(s)	Category	Diam.	Ref
209201	2003 UM_{267}	—	October 28, 2003	Socorro	LINEAR	HNS	1.8 km	MPC · JPL
209202	2003 UP_{268}	—	October 28, 2003	Socorro	LINEAR	·	1.6 km	MPC · JPL
209203	2003 UO_{281}	—	October 28, 2003	Haleakala	NEAT	·	1.7 km	MPC · JPL
209204	2003 UN_{283}	—	October 30, 2003	Socorro	LINEAR	(5)	1.6 km	MPC · JPL
209205	2003 UQ_{283}	—	October 30, 2003	Socorro	LINEAR	·	3.1 km	MPC · JPL
209206 Richardhenry	2003 UQ_{288}	Richardhenry	October 23, 2003	Kitt Peak	M. W. Buie	·	1.0 km	MPC · JPL
209207	2003 UD_{315}	—	October 25, 2003	Socorro	LINEAR	·	2.2 km	MPC · JPL
209208	2003 UP_{316}	—	October 27, 2003	Socorro	LINEAR	·	2.0 km	MPC · JPL
209209 Ericmarsh	2003 UB_{353}	Ericmarsh	October 19, 2003	Apache Point	SDSS	V	890 m	MPC · JPL
209210	2003 UB_{387}	—	October 22, 2003	Kitt Peak	Spacewatch	·	1.8 km	MPC · JPL
209211	2003 VH_{4}	—	November 14, 2003	Palomar	NEAT	·	1.5 km	MPC · JPL
209212	2003 VG_{7}	—	November 15, 2003	Kitt Peak	Spacewatch	·	1.6 km	MPC · JPL
209213	2003 WR_{1}	—	November 16, 2003	Catalina	CSS	MIS	3.3 km	MPC · JPL
209214	2003 WU_{7}	—	November 19, 2003	Palomar	NEAT	·	2.5 km	MPC · JPL
209215	2003 WP_{25}	—	November 21, 2003	Kitt Peak	Spacewatch	ATE	50 m	MPC · JPL
209216	2003 WK_{30}	—	November 18, 2003	Kitt Peak	Spacewatch	·	1.7 km	MPC · JPL
209217	2003 WB_{37}	—	November 19, 2003	Socorro	LINEAR	EUN	2.6 km	MPC · JPL
209218	2003 WZ_{40}	—	November 19, 2003	Kitt Peak	Spacewatch	·	2.6 km	MPC · JPL
209219	2003 WX_{52}	—	November 20, 2003	Kitt Peak	Spacewatch	·	1.8 km	MPC · JPL
209220	2003 WR_{55}	—	November 20, 2003	Socorro	LINEAR	·	1.7 km	MPC · JPL
209221	2003 WW_{61}	—	November 19, 2003	Kitt Peak	Spacewatch	·	1.9 km	MPC · JPL
209222	2003 WJ_{63}	—	November 19, 2003	Kitt Peak	Spacewatch	·	2.1 km	MPC · JPL
209223	2003 WE_{64}	—	November 19, 2003	Kitt Peak	Spacewatch	·	2.4 km	MPC · JPL
209224	2003 WC_{69}	—	November 19, 2003	Kitt Peak	Spacewatch	·	2.6 km	MPC · JPL
209225	2003 WB_{71}	—	November 20, 2003	Palomar	NEAT	·	2.8 km	MPC · JPL
209226	2003 WZ_{72}	—	November 20, 2003	Socorro	LINEAR	·	2.6 km	MPC · JPL
209227	2003 WV_{78}	—	November 20, 2003	Socorro	LINEAR	PAD	3.6 km	MPC · JPL
209228	2003 WF_{79}	—	November 20, 2003	Socorro	LINEAR	·	1.9 km	MPC · JPL
209229	2003 WZ_{81}	—	November 19, 2003	Socorro	LINEAR	·	2.2 km	MPC · JPL
209230	2003 WQ_{82}	—	November 19, 2003	Palomar	NEAT	EUN	1.9 km	MPC · JPL
209231	2003 WJ_{83}	—	November 20, 2003	Socorro	LINEAR	·	2.5 km	MPC · JPL
209232	2003 WH_{87}	—	November 21, 2003	Socorro	LINEAR	·	3.4 km	MPC · JPL
209233	2003 WN_{93}	—	November 19, 2003	Anderson Mesa	LONEOS	·	1.7 km	MPC · JPL
209234	2003 WP_{93}	—	November 19, 2003	Anderson Mesa	LONEOS	·	1.8 km	MPC · JPL
209235	2003 WT_{97}	—	November 19, 2003	Anderson Mesa	LONEOS	·	1.6 km	MPC · JPL
209236	2003 WT_{99}	—	November 20, 2003	Socorro	LINEAR	·	2.5 km	MPC · JPL
209237	2003 WL_{101}	—	November 21, 2003	Socorro	LINEAR	JUN	1.4 km	MPC · JPL
209238	2003 WF_{108}	—	November 20, 2003	Socorro	LINEAR	·	2.3 km	MPC · JPL
209239	2003 WU_{110}	—	November 20, 2003	Socorro	LINEAR	·	1.8 km	MPC · JPL
209240	2003 WQ_{111}	—	November 20, 2003	Socorro	LINEAR	(5)	1.5 km	MPC · JPL
209241	2003 WD_{112}	—	November 20, 2003	Socorro	LINEAR	·	2.0 km	MPC · JPL
209242	2003 WE_{116}	—	November 20, 2003	Socorro	LINEAR	·	2.5 km	MPC · JPL
209243	2003 WV_{118}	—	November 20, 2003	Socorro	LINEAR	(7744)	2.3 km	MPC · JPL
209244	2003 WX_{119}	—	November 20, 2003	Socorro	LINEAR	·	2.5 km	MPC · JPL
209245	2003 WW_{124}	—	November 20, 2003	Socorro	LINEAR	·	2.9 km	MPC · JPL
209246	2003 WJ_{125}	—	November 20, 2003	Socorro	LINEAR	(5)	2.1 km	MPC · JPL
209247	2003 WS_{127}	—	November 20, 2003	Socorro	LINEAR	·	2.0 km	MPC · JPL
209248	2003 WL_{129}	—	November 21, 2003	Socorro	LINEAR	·	1.6 km	MPC · JPL
209249	2003 WT_{131}	—	November 21, 2003	Palomar	NEAT	fast	2.2 km	MPC · JPL
209250	2003 WH_{134}	—	November 21, 2003	Socorro	LINEAR	·	3.9 km	MPC · JPL
209251	2003 WA_{138}	—	November 21, 2003	Socorro	LINEAR	·	1.8 km	MPC · JPL
209252	2003 WR_{146}	—	November 23, 2003	Catalina	CSS	·	2.3 km	MPC · JPL
209253	2003 WY_{146}	—	November 23, 2003	Catalina	CSS	·	2.1 km	MPC · JPL
209254	2003 WQ_{149}	—	November 24, 2003	Anderson Mesa	LONEOS	WIT · fast	1.3 km	MPC · JPL
209255 Myotragus	2003 WR_{152}	Myotragus	November 28, 2003	Costitx	OAM	EUN	2.0 km	MPC · JPL
209256	2003 WQ_{157}	—	November 26, 2003	Socorro	LINEAR	HNS	3.0 km	MPC · JPL
209257	2003 WY_{158}	—	November 29, 2003	Kitt Peak	Spacewatch	·	1.4 km	MPC · JPL
209258	2003 WS_{159}	—	November 30, 2003	Catalina	CSS	·	1.8 km	MPC · JPL
209259	2003 WW_{162}	—	November 30, 2003	Kitt Peak	Spacewatch	·	1.5 km	MPC · JPL
209260	2003 WF_{163}	—	November 30, 2003	Kitt Peak	Spacewatch	·	2.5 km	MPC · JPL
209261	2003 WP_{174}	—	November 19, 2003	Kitt Peak	Spacewatch	·	1.9 km	MPC · JPL
209262	2003 WX_{189}	—	November 24, 2003	Socorro	LINEAR	·	3.2 km	MPC · JPL
209263	2003 WZ_{189}	—	November 24, 2003	Socorro	LINEAR	HNS	2.1 km	MPC · JPL
209264	2003 WE_{192}	—	November 19, 2003	Socorro	LINEAR	·	2.2 km	MPC · JPL
209265	2003 XU_{3}	—	December 1, 2003	Socorro	LINEAR	·	2.8 km	MPC · JPL
209266	2003 XH_{4}	—	December 1, 2003	Socorro	LINEAR	·	2.2 km	MPC · JPL
209267	2003 XS_{6}	—	December 3, 2003	Socorro	LINEAR	·	3.2 km	MPC · JPL
209268	2003 XK_{8}	—	December 4, 2003	Socorro	LINEAR	·	2.9 km	MPC · JPL
209269	2003 XG_{9}	—	December 4, 2003	Socorro	LINEAR	·	3.2 km	MPC · JPL
209270	2003 XQ_{12}	—	December 14, 2003	Palomar	NEAT	526	3.0 km	MPC · JPL
209271	2003 XS_{12}	—	December 14, 2003	Palomar	NEAT	EUN	2.1 km	MPC · JPL
209272	2003 XW_{14}	—	December 15, 2003	Socorro	LINEAR	HNS	1.9 km	MPC · JPL
209273	2003 XP_{19}	—	December 14, 2003	Kitt Peak	Spacewatch	·	1.5 km	MPC · JPL
209274	2003 XY_{28}	—	December 1, 2003	Kitt Peak	Spacewatch	·	2.2 km	MPC · JPL
209275	2003 YB_{5}	—	December 16, 2003	Catalina	CSS	·	2.2 km	MPC · JPL
209276	2003 YO_{12}	—	December 17, 2003	Socorro	LINEAR	·	2.8 km	MPC · JPL
209277	2003 YS_{15}	—	December 17, 2003	Kitt Peak	Spacewatch	·	2.4 km	MPC · JPL
209278	2003 YW_{15}	—	December 17, 2003	Anderson Mesa	LONEOS	·	3.3 km	MPC · JPL
209279	2003 YY_{18}	—	December 17, 2003	Anderson Mesa	LONEOS	·	2.7 km	MPC · JPL
209280	2003 YX_{21}	—	December 17, 2003	Kitt Peak	Spacewatch	·	2.3 km	MPC · JPL
209281	2003 YD_{23}	—	December 16, 2003	Anderson Mesa	LONEOS	·	8.5 km	MPC · JPL
209282	2003 YS_{28}	—	December 17, 2003	Kitt Peak	Spacewatch	·	2.8 km	MPC · JPL
209283	2003 YV_{29}	—	December 17, 2003	Palomar	NEAT	DOR	4.4 km	MPC · JPL
209284	2003 YZ_{34}	—	December 18, 2003	Socorro	LINEAR	(12739)	3.1 km	MPC · JPL
209285	2003 YS_{40}	—	December 19, 2003	Kitt Peak	Spacewatch	·	2.5 km	MPC · JPL
209286	2003 YT_{40}	—	December 19, 2003	Kitt Peak	Spacewatch	KOR	1.7 km	MPC · JPL
209287	2003 YS_{43}	—	December 19, 2003	Socorro	LINEAR	GEF	1.8 km	MPC · JPL
209288	2003 YE_{48}	—	December 18, 2003	Socorro	LINEAR	·	2.0 km	MPC · JPL
209289	2003 YH_{55}	—	December 19, 2003	Socorro	LINEAR	·	2.1 km	MPC · JPL
209290	2003 YP_{56}	—	December 19, 2003	Socorro	LINEAR	·	2.6 km	MPC · JPL
209291	2003 YJ_{66}	—	December 20, 2003	Socorro	LINEAR	GEF	2.2 km	MPC · JPL
209292	2003 YZ_{77}	—	December 18, 2003	Socorro	LINEAR	·	3.0 km	MPC · JPL
209293	2003 YP_{85}	—	December 19, 2003	Socorro	LINEAR	·	2.8 km	MPC · JPL
209294	2003 YR_{89}	—	December 19, 2003	Kitt Peak	Spacewatch	·	2.8 km	MPC · JPL
209295	2003 YD_{107}	—	December 22, 2003	Kitt Peak	Spacewatch	MRX	1.6 km	MPC · JPL
209296	2003 YO_{109}	—	December 22, 2003	Kitt Peak	Spacewatch	AGN	1.7 km	MPC · JPL
209297	2003 YM_{111}	—	December 23, 2003	Socorro	LINEAR	·	1.6 km	MPC · JPL
209298	2003 YR_{111}	—	December 23, 2003	Socorro	LINEAR	·	3.4 km	MPC · JPL
209299	2003 YE_{119}	—	December 27, 2003	Socorro	LINEAR	HOF	3.8 km	MPC · JPL
209300	2003 YN_{120}	—	December 27, 2003	Socorro	LINEAR	·	3.1 km	MPC · JPL

== 209301–209400 ==
back to top

Designation			Discovery			Properties		Ref
Permanent	Provisional	Named after	Date	Site	Discoverer(s)	Category	Diam.	Ref
209301	2003 YX_{121}	—	December 25, 2003	Kitt Peak	Spacewatch	·	1.8 km	MPC · JPL
209302	2003 YN_{131}	—	December 28, 2003	Socorro	LINEAR	·	2.6 km	MPC · JPL
209303	2003 YG_{134}	—	December 28, 2003	Socorro	LINEAR	·	2.6 km	MPC · JPL
209304	2003 YN_{135}	—	December 28, 2003	Socorro	LINEAR	·	2.9 km	MPC · JPL
209305	2003 YX_{139}	—	December 28, 2003	Socorro	LINEAR	·	2.9 km	MPC · JPL
209306	2003 YY_{156}	—	December 16, 2003	Kitt Peak	Spacewatch	·	2.5 km	MPC · JPL
209307	2003 YX_{157}	—	December 17, 2003	Kitt Peak	Spacewatch	·	2.1 km	MPC · JPL
209308	2003 YN_{161}	—	December 17, 2003	Socorro	LINEAR	·	2.6 km	MPC · JPL
209309	2003 YV_{174}	—	December 19, 2003	Kitt Peak	Spacewatch	·	2.2 km	MPC · JPL
209310	2004 AP	—	January 12, 2004	Palomar	NEAT	·	3.3 km	MPC · JPL
209311	2004 AB_{2}	—	January 13, 2004	Anderson Mesa	LONEOS	H	700 m	MPC · JPL
209312	2004 AK_{22}	—	January 15, 2004	Kitt Peak	Spacewatch	·	1.7 km	MPC · JPL
209313	2004 AJ_{25}	—	January 12, 2004	Palomar	NEAT	·	1.8 km	MPC · JPL
209314	2004 BQ_{5}	—	January 16, 2004	Kitt Peak	Spacewatch	·	2.8 km	MPC · JPL
209315	2004 BL_{6}	—	January 16, 2004	Kitt Peak	Spacewatch	AGN	1.6 km	MPC · JPL
209316	2004 BP_{13}	—	January 17, 2004	Palomar	NEAT	·	1.9 km	MPC · JPL
209317	2004 BX_{16}	—	January 17, 2004	Palomar	NEAT	·	2.7 km	MPC · JPL
209318	2004 BQ_{33}	—	January 19, 2004	Kitt Peak	Spacewatch	PAD	1.8 km	MPC · JPL
209319	2004 BQ_{44}	—	January 22, 2004	Palomar	NEAT	·	3.2 km	MPC · JPL
209320	2004 BQ_{59}	—	January 24, 2004	Socorro	LINEAR	·	2.4 km	MPC · JPL
209321	2004 BM_{61}	—	January 22, 2004	Socorro	LINEAR	·	4.0 km	MPC · JPL
209322	2004 BN_{70}	—	January 22, 2004	Socorro	LINEAR	·	2.5 km	MPC · JPL
209323	2004 BJ_{71}	—	January 22, 2004	Socorro	LINEAR	·	2.7 km	MPC · JPL
209324	2004 BD_{82}	—	January 27, 2004	Anderson Mesa	LONEOS	·	2.5 km	MPC · JPL
209325	2004 BB_{84}	—	January 24, 2004	Socorro	LINEAR	·	3.8 km	MPC · JPL
209326	2004 BO_{87}	—	January 23, 2004	Anderson Mesa	LONEOS	·	3.2 km	MPC · JPL
209327	2004 BC_{92}	—	January 26, 2004	Anderson Mesa	LONEOS	·	5.7 km	MPC · JPL
209328	2004 BB_{93}	—	January 27, 2004	Anderson Mesa	LONEOS	·	2.9 km	MPC · JPL
209329	2004 BQ_{110}	—	January 28, 2004	Catalina	CSS	·	4.7 km	MPC · JPL
209330	2004 BN_{127}	—	January 16, 2004	Kitt Peak	Spacewatch	·	2.1 km	MPC · JPL
209331	2004 BQ_{131}	—	January 16, 2004	Kitt Peak	Spacewatch	AGN	1.4 km	MPC · JPL
209332	2004 BW_{131}	—	January 16, 2004	Kitt Peak	Spacewatch	·	1.9 km	MPC · JPL
209333	2004 BY_{136}	—	January 19, 2004	Kitt Peak	Spacewatch	·	1.7 km	MPC · JPL
209334	2004 BT_{147}	—	January 16, 2004	Catalina	CSS	·	2.1 km	MPC · JPL
209335	2004 BF_{148}	—	January 16, 2004	Palomar	NEAT	·	2.5 km	MPC · JPL
209336	2004 CZ_{2}	—	February 9, 2004	Palomar	NEAT	·	5.1 km	MPC · JPL
209337	2004 CM_{13}	—	February 11, 2004	Anderson Mesa	LONEOS	·	3.1 km	MPC · JPL
209338	2004 CJ_{14}	—	February 11, 2004	Kitt Peak	Spacewatch	·	2.9 km	MPC · JPL
209339	2004 CZ_{19}	—	February 11, 2004	Kitt Peak	Spacewatch	GEF	1.7 km	MPC · JPL
209340	2004 CQ_{21}	—	February 11, 2004	Anderson Mesa	LONEOS	·	3.1 km	MPC · JPL
209341	2004 CD_{28}	—	February 12, 2004	Kitt Peak	Spacewatch	·	3.3 km	MPC · JPL
209342	2004 CT_{47}	—	February 14, 2004	Haleakala	NEAT	·	2.8 km	MPC · JPL
209343	2004 CC_{51}	—	February 11, 2004	Palomar	NEAT	H	560 m	MPC · JPL
209344	2004 CL_{68}	—	February 11, 2004	Kitt Peak	Spacewatch	·	2.4 km	MPC · JPL
209345	2004 CD_{88}	—	February 11, 2004	Kitt Peak	Spacewatch	NEM	3.0 km	MPC · JPL
209346	2004 CZ_{93}	—	February 11, 2004	Palomar	NEAT	EOS	2.6 km	MPC · JPL
209347	2004 CG_{105}	—	February 13, 2004	Kitt Peak	Spacewatch	BRA	1.9 km	MPC · JPL
209348	2004 CA_{108}	—	February 14, 2004	Kitt Peak	Spacewatch	HOF	3.6 km	MPC · JPL
209349	2004 CR_{115}	—	February 10, 2004	Palomar	NEAT	AGN	1.6 km	MPC · JPL
209350	2004 CC_{116}	—	February 11, 2004	Kitt Peak	Spacewatch	·	2.6 km	MPC · JPL
209351	2004 DV_{5}	—	February 16, 2004	Kitt Peak	Spacewatch	AGN	1.6 km	MPC · JPL
209352	2004 DE_{11}	—	February 16, 2004	Kitt Peak	Spacewatch	·	2.6 km	MPC · JPL
209353	2004 DF_{18}	—	February 18, 2004	Haleakala	NEAT	·	2.8 km	MPC · JPL
209354	2004 DS_{25}	—	February 20, 2004	Altschwendt	W. Ries	EOS	2.4 km	MPC · JPL
209355	2004 DJ_{39}	—	February 22, 2004	Kitt Peak	Spacewatch	·	2.3 km	MPC · JPL
209356	2004 DD_{41}	—	February 18, 2004	Socorro	LINEAR	EOS	3.0 km	MPC · JPL
209357	2004 DQ_{42}	—	February 19, 2004	Socorro	LINEAR	·	8.0 km	MPC · JPL
209358	2004 DR_{44}	—	February 17, 2004	Kitt Peak	Spacewatch	·	2.6 km	MPC · JPL
209359	2004 DC_{46}	—	February 19, 2004	Socorro	LINEAR	·	3.4 km	MPC · JPL
209360	2004 DF_{53}	—	February 19, 2004	Bergisch Gladbach	W. Bickel	·	2.5 km	MPC · JPL
209361	2004 DV_{54}	—	February 22, 2004	Kitt Peak	Spacewatch	KOR	1.5 km	MPC · JPL
209362	2004 DD_{59}	—	February 23, 2004	Socorro	LINEAR	·	4.1 km	MPC · JPL
209363	2004 DF_{61}	—	February 26, 2004	Socorro	LINEAR	·	3.5 km	MPC · JPL
209364	2004 DA_{64}	—	February 29, 2004	Kitt Peak	Spacewatch	·	3.5 km	MPC · JPL
209365	2004 DO_{64}	—	February 18, 2004	Socorro	LINEAR	·	2.9 km	MPC · JPL
209366	2004 EA_{4}	—	March 10, 2004	Palomar	NEAT	H	610 m	MPC · JPL
209367	2004 EN_{8}	—	March 13, 2004	Palomar	NEAT	·	3.5 km	MPC · JPL
209368	2004 EG_{11}	—	March 10, 2004	Palomar	NEAT	·	3.7 km	MPC · JPL
209369	2004 EG_{14}	—	March 11, 2004	Palomar	NEAT	EOS	3.9 km	MPC · JPL
209370	2004 EL_{14}	—	March 11, 2004	Palomar	NEAT	·	3.4 km	MPC · JPL
209371	2004 ES_{14}	—	March 11, 2004	Palomar	NEAT	·	3.7 km	MPC · JPL
209372	2004 ED_{16}	—	March 12, 2004	Palomar	NEAT	EOS	2.6 km	MPC · JPL
209373	2004 EF_{16}	—	March 12, 2004	Palomar	NEAT	EOS	2.5 km	MPC · JPL
209374 Sabil	2004 EC_{22}	Sabil	March 15, 2004	Ottmarsheim	C. Rinner	KOR	2.1 km	MPC · JPL
209375	2004 EA_{24}	—	March 15, 2004	Catalina	CSS	·	4.0 km	MPC · JPL
209376	2004 EM_{24}	—	March 15, 2004	Desert Eagle	W. K. Y. Yeung	·	5.2 km	MPC · JPL
209377	2004 ES_{28}	—	March 15, 2004	Kitt Peak	Spacewatch	THM	2.5 km	MPC · JPL
209378	2004 EC_{30}	—	March 15, 2004	Kitt Peak	Spacewatch	THM	4.1 km	MPC · JPL
209379	2004 EU_{31}	—	March 14, 2004	Palomar	NEAT	(31811)	3.5 km	MPC · JPL
209380	2004 EX_{32}	—	March 15, 2004	Palomar	NEAT	·	5.0 km	MPC · JPL
209381	2004 EG_{40}	—	March 15, 2004	Kitt Peak	Spacewatch	·	3.6 km	MPC · JPL
209382	2004 EO_{41}	—	March 15, 2004	Catalina	CSS	EOS	3.5 km	MPC · JPL
209383	2004 EU_{43}	—	March 11, 2004	Palomar	NEAT	·	3.1 km	MPC · JPL
209384	2004 EN_{45}	—	March 15, 2004	Kitt Peak	Spacewatch	·	5.1 km	MPC · JPL
209385	2004 ED_{47}	—	March 15, 2004	Kitt Peak	Spacewatch	EOS	2.5 km	MPC · JPL
209386	2004 EO_{47}	—	March 15, 2004	Catalina	CSS	EOS	2.5 km	MPC · JPL
209387	2004 EZ_{47}	—	March 15, 2004	Catalina	CSS	·	2.4 km	MPC · JPL
209388	2004 EM_{49}	—	March 15, 2004	Catalina	CSS	EOS	2.6 km	MPC · JPL
209389	2004 EF_{52}	—	March 15, 2004	Socorro	LINEAR	EOS	5.4 km	MPC · JPL
209390	2004 EV_{56}	—	March 14, 2004	Palomar	NEAT	EUP	6.2 km	MPC · JPL
209391	2004 EP_{60}	—	March 11, 2004	Palomar	NEAT	·	2.9 km	MPC · JPL
209392	2004 EV_{61}	—	March 12, 2004	Palomar	NEAT	·	2.9 km	MPC · JPL
209393	2004 EE_{63}	—	March 13, 2004	Palomar	NEAT	·	3.1 km	MPC · JPL
209394	2004 EZ_{63}	—	March 13, 2004	Palomar	NEAT	·	2.4 km	MPC · JPL
209395	2004 ET_{69}	—	March 15, 2004	Kitt Peak	Spacewatch	·	2.7 km	MPC · JPL
209396	2004 EN_{71}	—	March 15, 2004	Kitt Peak	Spacewatch	·	5.3 km	MPC · JPL
209397	2004 EL_{75}	—	March 14, 2004	Kitt Peak	Spacewatch	·	5.1 km	MPC · JPL
209398	2004 ED_{78}	—	March 15, 2004	Catalina	CSS	·	3.3 km	MPC · JPL
209399	2004 EW_{78}	—	March 15, 2004	Kitt Peak	Spacewatch	·	2.7 km	MPC · JPL
209400	2004 EY_{82}	—	March 13, 2004	Palomar	NEAT	·	2.9 km	MPC · JPL

== 209401–209500 ==
back to top

Designation			Discovery			Properties		Ref
Permanent	Provisional	Named after	Date	Site	Discoverer(s)	Category	Diam.	Ref
209401	2004 EA_{83}	—	March 13, 2004	Palomar	NEAT	·	3.1 km	MPC · JPL
209402	2004 ER_{85}	—	March 15, 2004	Socorro	LINEAR	·	5.5 km	MPC · JPL
209403	2004 EO_{92}	—	March 15, 2004	Kitt Peak	Spacewatch	·	2.1 km	MPC · JPL
209404	2004 EV_{93}	—	March 15, 2004	Socorro	LINEAR	·	4.1 km	MPC · JPL
209405	2004 EZ_{94}	—	March 15, 2004	Socorro	LINEAR	·	5.4 km	MPC · JPL
209406	2004 EK_{95}	—	March 15, 2004	Socorro	LINEAR	·	5.7 km	MPC · JPL
209407	2004 FA_{4}	—	March 17, 2004	Bergisch Gladbach	W. Bickel	·	2.7 km	MPC · JPL
209408	2004 FB_{5}	—	March 20, 2004	Needville	Dillon, W. G.	·	2.2 km	MPC · JPL
209409	2004 FU_{8}	—	March 16, 2004	Socorro	LINEAR	·	3.1 km	MPC · JPL
209410	2004 FT_{11}	—	March 16, 2004	Catalina	CSS	VER	4.3 km	MPC · JPL
209411	2004 FF_{22}	—	March 16, 2004	Catalina	CSS	TIR	4.2 km	MPC · JPL
209412	2004 FM_{22}	—	March 16, 2004	Siding Spring	SSS	·	3.8 km	MPC · JPL
209413	2004 FJ_{24}	—	March 17, 2004	Kitt Peak	Spacewatch	·	2.4 km	MPC · JPL
209414	2004 FP_{30}	—	March 29, 2004	Socorro	LINEAR	T_{j} (2.99)	4.7 km	MPC · JPL
209415	2004 FZ_{30}	—	March 29, 2004	Socorro	LINEAR	EUP	4.1 km	MPC · JPL
209416	2004 FM_{31}	—	March 18, 2004	Palomar	NEAT	T_{j} (2.98) · EUP	5.1 km	MPC · JPL
209417	2004 FH_{32}	—	March 30, 2004	Socorro	LINEAR	·	4.7 km	MPC · JPL
209418	2004 FE_{35}	—	March 16, 2004	Kitt Peak	Spacewatch	·	6.4 km	MPC · JPL
209419	2004 FS_{35}	—	March 16, 2004	Socorro	LINEAR	·	3.8 km	MPC · JPL
209420	2004 FT_{37}	—	March 17, 2004	Socorro	LINEAR	·	4.3 km	MPC · JPL
209421	2004 FW_{37}	—	March 17, 2004	Socorro	LINEAR	·	3.9 km	MPC · JPL
209422	2004 FF_{38}	—	March 17, 2004	Socorro	LINEAR	·	4.6 km	MPC · JPL
209423	2004 FB_{40}	—	March 18, 2004	Socorro	LINEAR	·	3.4 km	MPC · JPL
209424	2004 FP_{45}	—	March 16, 2004	Catalina	CSS	EUP	4.3 km	MPC · JPL
209425	2004 FX_{45}	—	March 16, 2004	Kitt Peak	Spacewatch	LIX	6.8 km	MPC · JPL
209426	2004 FY_{49}	—	March 18, 2004	Socorro	LINEAR	EMA	4.6 km	MPC · JPL
209427	2004 FO_{50}	—	March 18, 2004	Socorro	LINEAR	·	4.8 km	MPC · JPL
209428	2004 FR_{50}	—	March 18, 2004	Kitt Peak	Spacewatch	·	3.3 km	MPC · JPL
209429	2004 FL_{52}	—	March 19, 2004	Socorro	LINEAR	·	4.0 km	MPC · JPL
209430	2004 FR_{56}	—	March 16, 2004	Kitt Peak	Spacewatch	·	4.2 km	MPC · JPL
209431	2004 FR_{59}	—	March 18, 2004	Socorro	LINEAR	·	4.1 km	MPC · JPL
209432	2004 FC_{63}	—	March 19, 2004	Kitt Peak	Spacewatch	·	2.6 km	MPC · JPL
209433	2004 FE_{63}	—	March 19, 2004	Socorro	LINEAR	·	4.5 km	MPC · JPL
209434	2004 FP_{63}	—	March 19, 2004	Socorro	LINEAR	·	3.6 km	MPC · JPL
209435	2004 FV_{63}	—	March 19, 2004	Socorro	LINEAR	EOS	2.6 km	MPC · JPL
209436	2004 FV_{69}	—	March 16, 2004	Kitt Peak	Spacewatch	EOS	2.8 km	MPC · JPL
209437	2004 FB_{70}	—	March 16, 2004	Kitt Peak	Spacewatch	·	3.4 km	MPC · JPL
209438	2004 FN_{81}	—	March 16, 2004	Socorro	LINEAR	·	5.6 km	MPC · JPL
209439	2004 FF_{93}	—	March 20, 2004	Socorro	LINEAR	·	2.3 km	MPC · JPL
209440	2004 FH_{94}	—	March 23, 2004	Socorro	LINEAR	VER	4.1 km	MPC · JPL
209441	2004 FY_{99}	—	March 23, 2004	Kitt Peak	Spacewatch	·	3.2 km	MPC · JPL
209442	2004 FA_{101}	—	March 23, 2004	Socorro	LINEAR	·	3.4 km	MPC · JPL
209443	2004 FJ_{107}	—	March 20, 2004	Socorro	LINEAR	·	3.5 km	MPC · JPL
209444	2004 FS_{115}	—	March 23, 2004	Socorro	LINEAR	·	4.6 km	MPC · JPL
209445	2004 FF_{123}	—	March 26, 2004	Kitt Peak	Spacewatch	·	2.8 km	MPC · JPL
209446	2004 FU_{130}	—	March 22, 2004	Anderson Mesa	LONEOS	·	5.8 km	MPC · JPL
209447	2004 FQ_{136}	—	March 27, 2004	Anderson Mesa	LONEOS	·	3.8 km	MPC · JPL
209448	2004 FO_{137}	—	March 29, 2004	Socorro	LINEAR	·	6.9 km	MPC · JPL
209449	2004 FL_{138}	—	March 29, 2004	Socorro	LINEAR	TIR	4.7 km	MPC · JPL
209450	2004 FE_{139}	—	March 20, 2004	Anderson Mesa	LONEOS	·	5.0 km	MPC · JPL
209451	2004 FF_{141}	—	March 27, 2004	Socorro	LINEAR	·	4.5 km	MPC · JPL
209452	2004 FT_{161}	—	March 18, 2004	Kitt Peak	Spacewatch	KOR	1.8 km	MPC · JPL
209453	2004 GA_{11}	—	April 11, 2004	Palomar	NEAT	TIR	2.9 km	MPC · JPL
209454	2004 GV_{11}	—	April 12, 2004	Socorro	LINEAR	H	680 m	MPC · JPL
209455	2004 GK_{15}	—	April 14, 2004	Socorro	LINEAR	H	910 m	MPC · JPL
209456	2004 GO_{16}	—	April 10, 2004	Palomar	NEAT	·	4.3 km	MPC · JPL
209457	2004 GK_{18}	—	April 12, 2004	Catalina	CSS	·	4.5 km	MPC · JPL
209458	2004 GP_{22}	—	April 12, 2004	Anderson Mesa	LONEOS	·	4.1 km	MPC · JPL
209459	2004 GF_{28}	—	April 14, 2004	Socorro	LINEAR	H	1.1 km	MPC · JPL
209460	2004 GG_{28}	—	April 15, 2004	Socorro	LINEAR	·	4.5 km	MPC · JPL
209461	2004 GZ_{33}	—	April 12, 2004	Kitt Peak	Spacewatch	LIX	5.4 km	MPC · JPL
209462	2004 GV_{40}	—	April 12, 2004	Kitt Peak	Spacewatch	THM	4.0 km	MPC · JPL
209463	2004 GG_{47}	—	April 12, 2004	Kitt Peak	Spacewatch	·	2.8 km	MPC · JPL
209464	2004 GW_{47}	—	April 12, 2004	Kitt Peak	Spacewatch	·	4.8 km	MPC · JPL
209465	2004 GO_{49}	—	April 12, 2004	Kitt Peak	Spacewatch	·	2.6 km	MPC · JPL
209466	2004 GM_{51}	—	April 13, 2004	Kitt Peak	Spacewatch	·	3.0 km	MPC · JPL
209467	2004 GW_{52}	—	April 13, 2004	Kitt Peak	Spacewatch	·	2.6 km	MPC · JPL
209468	2004 GX_{52}	—	April 13, 2004	Kitt Peak	Spacewatch	·	3.1 km	MPC · JPL
209469	2004 GZ_{55}	—	April 13, 2004	Kitt Peak	Spacewatch	·	4.4 km	MPC · JPL
209470	2004 GB_{57}	—	April 14, 2004	Kitt Peak	Spacewatch	·	2.5 km	MPC · JPL
209471	2004 GF_{58}	—	April 14, 2004	Kitt Peak	Spacewatch	·	3.7 km	MPC · JPL
209472	2004 GB_{62}	—	April 13, 2004	Kitt Peak	Spacewatch	·	3.3 km	MPC · JPL
209473	2004 GS_{80}	—	April 13, 2004	Kitt Peak	Spacewatch	·	3.4 km	MPC · JPL
209474	2004 HK_{1}	—	April 19, 2004	Socorro	LINEAR	H	830 m	MPC · JPL
209475	2004 HT_{2}	—	April 16, 2004	Palomar	NEAT	·	4.2 km	MPC · JPL
209476	2004 HH_{4}	—	April 16, 2004	Socorro	LINEAR	·	4.3 km	MPC · JPL
209477	2004 HO_{8}	—	April 16, 2004	Socorro	LINEAR	·	4.1 km	MPC · JPL
209478	2004 HP_{17}	—	April 17, 2004	Socorro	LINEAR	·	4.8 km	MPC · JPL
209479	2004 HU_{18}	—	April 19, 2004	Anderson Mesa	LONEOS	·	6.6 km	MPC · JPL
209480	2004 HD_{30}	—	April 21, 2004	Socorro	LINEAR	HYG	4.0 km	MPC · JPL
209481	2004 HG_{33}	—	April 23, 2004	Socorro	LINEAR	H	720 m	MPC · JPL
209482	2004 HH_{34}	—	April 17, 2004	Socorro	LINEAR	·	3.6 km	MPC · JPL
209483	2004 HT_{37}	—	April 22, 2004	Catalina	CSS	·	5.1 km	MPC · JPL
209484	2004 HE_{45}	—	April 21, 2004	Socorro	LINEAR	·	4.6 km	MPC · JPL
209485	2004 HZ_{51}	—	April 24, 2004	Socorro	LINEAR	·	5.3 km	MPC · JPL
209486	2004 HB_{60}	—	April 23, 2004	Catalina	CSS	·	4.3 km	MPC · JPL
209487	2004 HP_{60}	—	April 17, 2004	Socorro	LINEAR	TIR	5.0 km	MPC · JPL
209488	2004 HW_{62}	—	April 30, 2004	Haleakala	NEAT	·	4.4 km	MPC · JPL
209489	2004 JV	—	May 10, 2004	Desert Eagle	W. K. Y. Yeung	THM	4.3 km	MPC · JPL
209490	2004 JW_{3}	—	May 9, 2004	Kitt Peak	Spacewatch	CYB	4.2 km	MPC · JPL
209491	2004 JO_{5}	—	May 10, 2004	Catalina	CSS	TIR	3.8 km	MPC · JPL
209492	2004 JA_{6}	—	May 12, 2004	Socorro	LINEAR	H	900 m	MPC · JPL
209493	2004 JZ_{6}	—	May 9, 2004	Haleakala	NEAT	H	820 m	MPC · JPL
209494	2004 JL_{8}	—	May 12, 2004	Catalina	CSS	LIX	4.9 km	MPC · JPL
209495	2004 JS_{10}	—	May 12, 2004	Catalina	CSS	TIR	4.4 km	MPC · JPL
209496	2004 JJ_{11}	—	May 12, 2004	Catalina	CSS	·	6.2 km	MPC · JPL
209497	2004 JJ_{14}	—	May 9, 2004	Kitt Peak	Spacewatch	·	6.1 km	MPC · JPL
209498	2004 JO_{17}	—	May 12, 2004	Siding Spring	SSS	THM	3.3 km	MPC · JPL
209499	2004 JG_{21}	—	May 9, 2004	Kitt Peak	Spacewatch	·	4.0 km	MPC · JPL
209500	2004 JT_{21}	—	May 9, 2004	Kitt Peak	Spacewatch	·	3.4 km	MPC · JPL

== 209501–209600 ==
back to top

Designation			Discovery			Properties		Ref
Permanent	Provisional	Named after	Date	Site	Discoverer(s)	Category	Diam.	Ref
209501	2004 JX_{43}	—	May 12, 2004	Anderson Mesa	LONEOS	·	5.6 km	MPC · JPL
209502	2004 KT_{15}	—	May 23, 2004	Kitt Peak	Spacewatch	·	3.2 km	MPC · JPL
209503	2004 KU_{17}	—	May 23, 2004	Catalina	CSS	H	910 m	MPC · JPL
209504	2004 LT_{2}	—	June 11, 2004	Palomar	NEAT	H	880 m	MPC · JPL
209505	2004 LG_{20}	—	June 11, 2004	Palomar	NEAT	·	1.4 km	MPC · JPL
209506	2004 NR_{24}	—	July 15, 2004	Socorro	LINEAR	PHO	1.5 km	MPC · JPL
209507	2004 PP_{10}	—	August 7, 2004	Campo Imperatore	CINEOS	HIL · 3:2	11 km	MPC · JPL
209508	2004 PN_{31}	—	August 8, 2004	Socorro	LINEAR	·	950 m	MPC · JPL
209509	2004 PC_{71}	—	August 8, 2004	Palomar	NEAT	·	1.3 km	MPC · JPL
209510	2004 PE_{85}	—	August 10, 2004	Socorro	LINEAR	·	1.2 km	MPC · JPL
209511	2004 PR_{85}	—	August 10, 2004	Socorro	LINEAR	NYS	1.5 km	MPC · JPL
209512	2004 RO_{2}	—	September 5, 2004	Bergisch Gladbach	W. Bickel	HIL · 3:2	7.4 km	MPC · JPL
209513	2004 RV_{30}	—	September 7, 2004	Socorro	LINEAR	H	730 m	MPC · JPL
209514	2004 RT_{94}	—	September 8, 2004	Socorro	LINEAR	V	760 m	MPC · JPL
209515	2004 RP_{195}	—	September 10, 2004	Socorro	LINEAR	·	1.0 km	MPC · JPL
209516	2004 RY_{287}	—	September 15, 2004	7300	W. K. Y. Yeung	·	1.4 km	MPC · JPL
209517	2004 RW_{307}	—	September 13, 2004	Socorro	LINEAR	·	920 m	MPC · JPL
209518	2004 RO_{308}	—	September 13, 2004	Socorro	LINEAR	·	1.7 km	MPC · JPL
209519	2004 RQ_{326}	—	September 13, 2004	Socorro	LINEAR	PHO	1.5 km	MPC · JPL
209520	2004 RS_{336}	—	September 15, 2004	Kitt Peak	Spacewatch	·	1.1 km	MPC · JPL
209521	2004 SL_{33}	—	September 17, 2004	Socorro	LINEAR	·	1.0 km	MPC · JPL
209522	2004 SF_{34}	—	September 17, 2004	Socorro	LINEAR	·	1.2 km	MPC · JPL
209523	2004 SP_{53}	—	September 22, 2004	Socorro	LINEAR	·	720 m	MPC · JPL
209524	2004 SX_{60}	—	September 17, 2004	Kitt Peak	Spacewatch	·	880 m	MPC · JPL
209525	2004 TA_{8}	—	October 5, 2004	Goodricke-Pigott	R. A. Tucker	NYS	1.4 km	MPC · JPL
209526	2004 TJ_{52}	—	October 4, 2004	Kitt Peak	Spacewatch	·	910 m	MPC · JPL
209527	2004 TQ_{60}	—	October 5, 2004	Anderson Mesa	LONEOS	·	940 m	MPC · JPL
209528	2004 TF_{68}	—	October 5, 2004	Anderson Mesa	LONEOS	·	1.3 km	MPC · JPL
209529	2004 TO_{91}	—	October 5, 2004	Kitt Peak	Spacewatch	·	1.7 km	MPC · JPL
209530	2004 TA_{112}	—	October 7, 2004	Kitt Peak	Spacewatch	·	1.1 km	MPC · JPL
209531	2004 TY_{145}	—	October 5, 2004	Kitt Peak	Spacewatch	WIT	1.7 km	MPC · JPL
209532	2004 TR_{275}	—	October 9, 2004	Kitt Peak	Spacewatch	·	650 m	MPC · JPL
209533	2004 TR_{287}	—	October 9, 2004	Socorro	LINEAR	PHO	1.4 km	MPC · JPL
209534	2004 TM_{323}	—	October 11, 2004	Kitt Peak	Spacewatch	ERI	2.6 km	MPC · JPL
209535	2004 TM_{331}	—	October 9, 2004	Kitt Peak	Spacewatch	·	1.1 km	MPC · JPL
209536	2004 TJ_{351}	—	October 10, 2004	Kitt Peak	Spacewatch	·	700 m	MPC · JPL
209537	2004 TV_{367}	—	October 4, 2004	Kitt Peak	Spacewatch	·	800 m	MPC · JPL
209538	2004 TE_{368}	—	October 13, 2004	Kitt Peak	Spacewatch	·	830 m	MPC · JPL
209539	2004 TW_{368}	—	October 7, 2004	Kitt Peak	Spacewatch	(883)	1.1 km	MPC · JPL
209540 Siurana	2004 UK_{1}	Siurana	October 23, 2004	Begues	Manteca, J.	·	950 m	MPC · JPL
209541	2004 UD_{3}	—	October 18, 2004	Socorro	LINEAR	·	1.2 km	MPC · JPL
209542	2004 UJ_{3}	—	October 19, 2004	Socorro	LINEAR	PHO	2.0 km	MPC · JPL
209543	2004 US_{5}	—	October 20, 2004	Socorro	LINEAR	·	1.0 km	MPC · JPL
209544	2004 VN_{5}	—	November 3, 2004	Anderson Mesa	LONEOS	·	870 m	MPC · JPL
209545	2004 VL_{11}	—	November 3, 2004	Palomar	NEAT	·	910 m	MPC · JPL
209546	2004 VJ_{22}	—	November 4, 2004	Kitt Peak	Spacewatch	NYS	1.3 km	MPC · JPL
209547	2004 VT_{38}	—	November 4, 2004	Kitt Peak	Spacewatch	·	850 m	MPC · JPL
209548	2004 VU_{48}	—	November 4, 2004	Kitt Peak	Spacewatch	PHO	1.5 km	MPC · JPL
209549	2004 VR_{53}	—	November 7, 2004	Socorro	LINEAR	·	1.6 km	MPC · JPL
209550	2004 VH_{56}	—	November 4, 2004	Kitt Peak	Spacewatch	·	920 m	MPC · JPL
209551	2004 VZ_{57}	—	November 7, 2004	Socorro	LINEAR	·	1.7 km	MPC · JPL
209552 Isaacroberts	2004 VZ_{63}	Isaacroberts	November 9, 2004	Haleakala	Faulkes Telescope Educational Project	V	540 m	MPC · JPL
209553	2004 VQ_{69}	—	November 14, 2004	Ottmarsheim	Ottmarsheim	·	970 m	MPC · JPL
209554	2004 VE_{74}	—	November 12, 2004	Catalina	CSS	·	1.1 km	MPC · JPL
209555	2004 VM_{112}	—	November 11, 2004	Kitt Peak	Spacewatch	·	960 m	MPC · JPL
209556	2004 WG_{4}	—	November 17, 2004	Campo Imperatore	CINEOS	·	930 m	MPC · JPL
209557	2004 WJ_{12}	—	November 19, 2004	Socorro	LINEAR	ERI	2.1 km	MPC · JPL
209558	2004 XO_{2}	—	December 1, 2004	Palomar	NEAT	·	1.9 km	MPC · JPL
209559	2004 XC_{3}	—	December 3, 2004	Cordell-Lorenz	Cordell-Lorenz	·	1.1 km	MPC · JPL
209560	2004 XC_{7}	—	December 2, 2004	Socorro	LINEAR	NYS	1.5 km	MPC · JPL
209561	2004 XF_{12}	—	December 8, 2004	Socorro	LINEAR	NYS	1.5 km	MPC · JPL
209562	2004 XM_{12}	—	December 8, 2004	Socorro	LINEAR	·	1.0 km	MPC · JPL
209563	2004 XC_{13}	—	December 8, 2004	Socorro	LINEAR	·	1.7 km	MPC · JPL
209564	2004 XO_{13}	—	December 8, 2004	Socorro	LINEAR	·	1.6 km	MPC · JPL
209565	2004 XD_{15}	—	December 8, 2004	Socorro	LINEAR	·	2.0 km	MPC · JPL
209566	2004 XC_{19}	—	December 8, 2004	Socorro	LINEAR	·	1.4 km	MPC · JPL
209567	2004 XJ_{20}	—	December 8, 2004	Socorro	LINEAR	·	1.3 km	MPC · JPL
209568	2004 XV_{27}	—	December 10, 2004	Kitt Peak	Spacewatch	·	1.4 km	MPC · JPL
209569	2004 XN_{32}	—	December 10, 2004	Socorro	LINEAR	·	1.1 km	MPC · JPL
209570	2004 XL_{40}	—	December 10, 2004	Socorro	LINEAR	(1338) (FLO)	850 m	MPC · JPL
209571	2004 XM_{50}	—	December 10, 2004	Hormersdorf	Hormersdorf	·	1.3 km	MPC · JPL
209572	2004 XL_{57}	—	December 10, 2004	Kitt Peak	Spacewatch	MAS	930 m	MPC · JPL
209573	2004 XW_{58}	—	December 10, 2004	Kitt Peak	Spacewatch	·	1.8 km	MPC · JPL
209574	2004 XM_{63}	—	December 10, 2004	Socorro	LINEAR	PHO	1.9 km	MPC · JPL
209575	2004 XV_{63}	—	December 2, 2004	Kitt Peak	Spacewatch	·	1.2 km	MPC · JPL
209576	2004 XN_{82}	—	December 11, 2004	Kitt Peak	Spacewatch	·	1.5 km	MPC · JPL
209577	2004 XY_{83}	—	December 11, 2004	Kitt Peak	Spacewatch	·	1.6 km	MPC · JPL
209578	2004 XE_{84}	—	December 11, 2004	Campo Imperatore	CINEOS	·	1.6 km	MPC · JPL
209579	2004 XL_{89}	—	December 10, 2004	Campo Imperatore	CINEOS	·	1.4 km	MPC · JPL
209580	2004 XN_{98}	—	December 11, 2004	Kitt Peak	Spacewatch	·	1.0 km	MPC · JPL
209581	2004 XU_{102}	—	December 14, 2004	Catalina	CSS	·	1.2 km	MPC · JPL
209582	2004 XT_{104}	—	December 10, 2004	Kitt Peak	Spacewatch	·	1.8 km	MPC · JPL
209583	2004 XE_{106}	—	December 11, 2004	Socorro	LINEAR	·	950 m	MPC · JPL
209584	2004 XT_{106}	—	December 11, 2004	Socorro	LINEAR	·	1.6 km	MPC · JPL
209585	2004 XY_{107}	—	December 11, 2004	Socorro	LINEAR	·	2.0 km	MPC · JPL
209586	2004 XN_{108}	—	December 11, 2004	Socorro	LINEAR	·	1.7 km	MPC · JPL
209587	2004 XB_{110}	—	December 14, 2004	Anderson Mesa	LONEOS	·	1.2 km	MPC · JPL
209588	2004 XL_{120}	—	December 13, 2004	Kitt Peak	Spacewatch	·	1.3 km	MPC · JPL
209589	2004 XV_{120}	—	December 14, 2004	Socorro	LINEAR	·	1.1 km	MPC · JPL
209590	2004 XD_{122}	—	December 15, 2004	Socorro	LINEAR	NYS	1.7 km	MPC · JPL
209591	2004 XB_{128}	—	December 14, 2004	Socorro	LINEAR	·	1.2 km	MPC · JPL
209592	2004 XM_{133}	—	December 15, 2004	Socorro	LINEAR	·	1.5 km	MPC · JPL
209593	2004 XE_{142}	—	December 15, 2004	Socorro	LINEAR	·	1.2 km	MPC · JPL
209594	2004 XZ_{148}	—	December 14, 2004	Socorro	LINEAR	(5)	1.6 km	MPC · JPL
209595	2004 XU_{154}	—	December 15, 2004	Socorro	LINEAR	V	820 m	MPC · JPL
209596	2004 XY_{159}	—	December 14, 2004	Kitt Peak	Spacewatch	·	2.1 km	MPC · JPL
209597	2004 XC_{166}	—	December 2, 2004	Palomar	NEAT	·	1.2 km	MPC · JPL
209598	2004 XC_{177}	—	December 11, 2004	Kitt Peak	Spacewatch	·	1.6 km	MPC · JPL
209599	2004 YK	—	December 17, 2004	Socorro	LINEAR	·	1.5 km	MPC · JPL
209600	2004 YN_{3}	—	December 16, 2004	Anderson Mesa	LONEOS	·	1.0 km	MPC · JPL

== 209601–209700 ==
back to top

Designation			Discovery			Properties		Ref
Permanent	Provisional	Named after	Date	Site	Discoverer(s)	Category	Diam.	Ref
209601	2004 YP_{4}	—	December 17, 2004	Socorro	LINEAR	·	1.1 km	MPC · JPL
209602	2004 YM_{12}	—	December 18, 2004	Mount Lemmon	Mount Lemmon Survey	NYS	1.7 km	MPC · JPL
209603	2004 YZ_{14}	—	December 18, 2004	Mount Lemmon	Mount Lemmon Survey	NYS	1.5 km	MPC · JPL
209604	2004 YP_{15}	—	December 18, 2004	Mount Lemmon	Mount Lemmon Survey	NYS	1.7 km	MPC · JPL
209605	2004 YE_{19}	—	December 18, 2004	Mount Lemmon	Mount Lemmon Survey	SUL ·	3.2 km	MPC · JPL
209606	2004 YA_{27}	—	December 19, 2004	Mount Lemmon	Mount Lemmon Survey	EUN	1.8 km	MPC · JPL
209607	2004 YV_{33}	—	December 17, 2004	Socorro	LINEAR	·	2.5 km	MPC · JPL
209608	2005 AB_{1}	—	January 1, 2005	Catalina	CSS	NYS ·	2.3 km	MPC · JPL
209609	2005 AJ_{2}	—	January 6, 2005	Socorro	LINEAR	·	2.3 km	MPC · JPL
209610	2005 AL_{2}	—	January 6, 2005	Catalina	CSS	·	2.2 km	MPC · JPL
209611	2005 AX_{4}	—	January 6, 2005	Catalina	CSS	NYS	1.7 km	MPC · JPL
209612	2005 AC_{6}	—	January 6, 2005	Catalina	CSS	·	2.0 km	MPC · JPL
209613	2005 AT_{7}	—	January 6, 2005	Catalina	CSS	NYS	1.6 km	MPC · JPL
209614	2005 AP_{10}	—	January 6, 2005	Catalina	CSS	V	1.2 km	MPC · JPL
209615	2005 AY_{13}	—	January 7, 2005	Nogales	Tenagra II	NYS	1.7 km	MPC · JPL
209616	2005 AK_{14}	—	January 6, 2005	Socorro	LINEAR	NYS	1.7 km	MPC · JPL
209617	2005 AD_{15}	—	January 6, 2005	Socorro	LINEAR	·	1.7 km	MPC · JPL
209618	2005 AH_{16}	—	January 6, 2005	Socorro	LINEAR	·	2.5 km	MPC · JPL
209619	2005 AT_{19}	—	January 6, 2005	Catalina	CSS	·	1.4 km	MPC · JPL
209620	2005 AA_{21}	—	January 6, 2005	Socorro	LINEAR	·	2.0 km	MPC · JPL
209621	2005 AU_{22}	—	January 7, 2005	Socorro	LINEAR	·	1.5 km	MPC · JPL
209622	2005 AW_{31}	—	January 11, 2005	Socorro	LINEAR	·	1.5 km	MPC · JPL
209623	2005 AF_{43}	—	January 15, 2005	Socorro	LINEAR	·	2.0 km	MPC · JPL
209624	2005 AU_{43}	—	January 15, 2005	Kitt Peak	Spacewatch	·	1.7 km	MPC · JPL
209625	2005 AJ_{44}	—	January 15, 2005	Kitt Peak	Spacewatch	·	1.5 km	MPC · JPL
209626	2005 AL_{45}	—	January 1, 2005	Catalina	CSS	·	1.6 km	MPC · JPL
209627	2005 AD_{46}	—	January 11, 2005	Great Shefford	Birtwhistle, P.	·	2.3 km	MPC · JPL
209628	2005 AL_{46}	—	January 11, 2005	Socorro	LINEAR	MAS	1.0 km	MPC · JPL
209629	2005 AL_{53}	—	January 13, 2005	Socorro	LINEAR	·	2.0 km	MPC · JPL
209630	2005 AB_{54}	—	January 13, 2005	Catalina	CSS	·	3.1 km	MPC · JPL
209631	2005 AL_{56}	—	January 15, 2005	Socorro	LINEAR	·	1.9 km	MPC · JPL
209632	2005 AM_{61}	—	January 15, 2005	Kitt Peak	Spacewatch	·	1.8 km	MPC · JPL
209633	2005 AP_{79}	—	January 15, 2005	Kitt Peak	Spacewatch	TEL	5.2 km	MPC · JPL
209634	2005 BK	—	January 16, 2005	Desert Eagle	W. K. Y. Yeung	MAS	950 m	MPC · JPL
209635	2005 BR_{1}	—	January 17, 2005	Wrightwood	J. W. Young	·	1.7 km	MPC · JPL
209636	2005 BV_{1}	—	January 17, 2005	Catalina	CSS	BAR	2.8 km	MPC · JPL
209637	2005 BU_{4}	—	January 16, 2005	Socorro	LINEAR	NYS	1.6 km	MPC · JPL
209638	2005 BT_{10}	—	January 16, 2005	Kitt Peak	Spacewatch	·	1.6 km	MPC · JPL
209639	2005 BU_{11}	—	January 16, 2005	Kitt Peak	Spacewatch	·	1.3 km	MPC · JPL
209640	2005 BK_{15}	—	January 16, 2005	Kitt Peak	Spacewatch	·	2.6 km	MPC · JPL
209641	2005 BK_{24}	—	January 17, 2005	Catalina	CSS	·	1.8 km	MPC · JPL
209642	2005 BP_{24}	—	January 17, 2005	Catalina	CSS	·	1.9 km	MPC · JPL
209643	2005 BZ_{26}	—	January 29, 2005	Junk Bond	D. Healy	·	1.4 km	MPC · JPL
209644	2005 CR	—	February 1, 2005	Palomar	NEAT	·	2.0 km	MPC · JPL
209645	2005 CC_{2}	—	February 1, 2005	Kitt Peak	Spacewatch	BAR	1.8 km	MPC · JPL
209646	2005 CE_{2}	—	February 1, 2005	Kitt Peak	Spacewatch	·	1.5 km	MPC · JPL
209647	2005 CS_{2}	—	February 1, 2005	Catalina	CSS	·	1.4 km	MPC · JPL
209648	2005 CV_{4}	—	February 1, 2005	Catalina	CSS	·	1.6 km	MPC · JPL
209649	2005 CC_{5}	—	February 1, 2005	Palomar	NEAT	MAR	1.5 km	MPC · JPL
209650	2005 CV_{5}	—	February 1, 2005	Kitt Peak	Spacewatch	V	1.1 km	MPC · JPL
209651	2005 CS_{8}	—	February 1, 2005	Kitt Peak	Spacewatch	·	1.8 km	MPC · JPL
209652	2005 CU_{8}	—	February 1, 2005	Kitt Peak	Spacewatch	NYS	1.6 km	MPC · JPL
209653	2005 CT_{10}	—	February 1, 2005	Kitt Peak	Spacewatch	·	1.8 km	MPC · JPL
209654	2005 CX_{15}	—	February 2, 2005	Socorro	LINEAR	·	1.5 km	MPC · JPL
209655	2005 CJ_{20}	—	February 2, 2005	Catalina	CSS	NYS	1.9 km	MPC · JPL
209656	2005 CK_{20}	—	February 2, 2005	Catalina	CSS	MAS	1.0 km	MPC · JPL
209657	2005 CS_{23}	—	February 2, 2005	Socorro	LINEAR	·	1.9 km	MPC · JPL
209658	2005 CF_{27}	—	February 2, 2005	Kitt Peak	Spacewatch	EUN	1.4 km	MPC · JPL
209659	2005 CP_{31}	—	February 1, 2005	Kitt Peak	Spacewatch	·	2.0 km	MPC · JPL
209660	2005 CZ_{31}	—	February 1, 2005	Kitt Peak	Spacewatch	MAS	970 m	MPC · JPL
209661	2005 CR_{35}	—	February 3, 2005	Socorro	LINEAR	·	1.7 km	MPC · JPL
209662	2005 CC_{40}	—	February 4, 2005	Bergisch Gladbach	W. Bickel	(5)	1.4 km	MPC · JPL
209663	2005 CO_{41}	—	February 2, 2005	Kitt Peak	Spacewatch	·	1.9 km	MPC · JPL
209664	2005 CB_{45}	—	February 2, 2005	Kitt Peak	Spacewatch	·	1.9 km	MPC · JPL
209665	2005 CZ_{45}	—	February 2, 2005	Kitt Peak	Spacewatch	·	2.9 km	MPC · JPL
209666	2005 CV_{48}	—	February 2, 2005	Catalina	CSS	·	2.5 km	MPC · JPL
209667	2005 CZ_{48}	—	February 2, 2005	Catalina	CSS	NYS	1.6 km	MPC · JPL
209668	2005 CZ_{49}	—	February 2, 2005	Socorro	LINEAR	·	1.6 km	MPC · JPL
209669	2005 CU_{56}	—	February 2, 2005	Kitt Peak	Spacewatch	MAR	1.5 km	MPC · JPL
209670	2005 CN_{58}	—	February 2, 2005	Catalina	CSS	V	980 m	MPC · JPL
209671	2005 CE_{59}	—	February 2, 2005	Socorro	LINEAR	·	1.7 km	MPC · JPL
209672	2005 CD_{64}	—	February 9, 2005	Anderson Mesa	LONEOS	·	5.5 km	MPC · JPL
209673	2005 CX_{64}	—	February 9, 2005	Mount Lemmon	Mount Lemmon Survey	·	1.8 km	MPC · JPL
209674	2005 CF_{67}	—	February 9, 2005	Socorro	LINEAR	·	2.1 km	MPC · JPL
209675	2005 DF_{1}	—	February 28, 2005	Vicques	M. Ory	V	1.2 km	MPC · JPL
209676	2005 EC	—	March 1, 2005	Kitt Peak	Spacewatch	·	4.0 km	MPC · JPL
209677	2005 EM	—	March 1, 2005	Kitt Peak	Spacewatch	V	1.1 km	MPC · JPL
209678	2005 ER_{6}	—	March 1, 2005	Kitt Peak	Spacewatch	·	2.8 km	MPC · JPL
209679	2005 EV_{8}	—	March 2, 2005	Kitt Peak	Spacewatch	·	1.6 km	MPC · JPL
209680	2005 EC_{9}	—	March 2, 2005	Kitt Peak	Spacewatch	·	1.4 km	MPC · JPL
209681	2005 EX_{11}	—	March 2, 2005	Catalina	CSS	·	1.6 km	MPC · JPL
209682	2005 ER_{12}	—	March 2, 2005	Catalina	CSS	·	1.9 km	MPC · JPL
209683	2005 ED_{13}	—	March 2, 2005	Catalina	CSS	·	1.9 km	MPC · JPL
209684	2005 ET_{14}	—	March 3, 2005	Kitt Peak	Spacewatch	NYS	1.5 km	MPC · JPL
209685	2005 EX_{18}	—	March 3, 2005	Kitt Peak	Spacewatch	·	2.8 km	MPC · JPL
209686	2005 ET_{19}	—	March 3, 2005	Socorro	LINEAR	·	3.6 km	MPC · JPL
209687	2005 EB_{22}	—	March 3, 2005	Catalina	CSS	·	2.6 km	MPC · JPL
209688	2005 EE_{22}	—	March 3, 2005	Catalina	CSS	·	1.4 km	MPC · JPL
209689	2005 EH_{22}	—	March 3, 2005	Catalina	CSS	·	1.8 km	MPC · JPL
209690	2005 EN_{22}	—	March 3, 2005	Catalina	CSS	KOR	2.2 km	MPC · JPL
209691	2005 EB_{23}	—	March 3, 2005	Catalina	CSS	·	1.8 km	MPC · JPL
209692	2005 EU_{28}	—	March 3, 2005	Catalina	CSS	·	2.1 km	MPC · JPL
209693	2005 EF_{29}	—	March 3, 2005	Catalina	CSS	·	1.6 km	MPC · JPL
209694	2005 EF_{30}	—	March 3, 2005	Great Shefford	Birtwhistle, P.	·	1.6 km	MPC · JPL
209695	2005 EK_{31}	—	March 2, 2005	Kitt Peak	Spacewatch	·	1.6 km	MPC · JPL
209696	2005 EP_{31}	—	March 2, 2005	Catalina	CSS	·	1.5 km	MPC · JPL
209697	2005 EV_{33}	—	March 7, 2005	Mayhill	Lowe, A.	·	1.9 km	MPC · JPL
209698	2005 EW_{44}	—	March 3, 2005	Kitt Peak	Spacewatch	·	2.4 km	MPC · JPL
209699	2005 ED_{45}	—	March 3, 2005	Catalina	CSS	·	2.0 km	MPC · JPL
209700	2005 ED_{48}	—	March 3, 2005	Catalina	CSS	·	1.9 km	MPC · JPL

== 209701–209800 ==
back to top

Designation			Discovery			Properties		Ref
Permanent	Provisional	Named after	Date	Site	Discoverer(s)	Category	Diam.	Ref
209701	2005 EE_{49}	—	March 3, 2005	Catalina	CSS	·	1.7 km	MPC · JPL
209702	2005 ER_{53}	—	March 4, 2005	Kitt Peak	Spacewatch	·	1.7 km	MPC · JPL
209703	2005 EQ_{54}	—	March 4, 2005	Kitt Peak	Spacewatch	·	3.3 km	MPC · JPL
209704	2005 EJ_{57}	—	March 4, 2005	Mount Lemmon	Mount Lemmon Survey	·	1.8 km	MPC · JPL
209705	2005 EU_{58}	—	March 4, 2005	Kitt Peak	Spacewatch	·	1.7 km	MPC · JPL
209706	2005 EK_{63}	—	March 4, 2005	Socorro	LINEAR	·	1.5 km	MPC · JPL
209707	2005 EU_{73}	—	March 3, 2005	Kitt Peak	Spacewatch	HNS	1.5 km	MPC · JPL
209708	2005 ES_{74}	—	March 3, 2005	Kitt Peak	Spacewatch	·	1.6 km	MPC · JPL
209709	2005 ET_{75}	—	March 3, 2005	Kitt Peak	Spacewatch	·	2.0 km	MPC · JPL
209710	2005 ED_{77}	—	March 3, 2005	Kitt Peak	Spacewatch	·	1.4 km	MPC · JPL
209711	2005 EW_{84}	—	March 4, 2005	Catalina	CSS	JUN	1.8 km	MPC · JPL
209712	2005 EU_{92}	—	March 8, 2005	Anderson Mesa	LONEOS	·	1.9 km	MPC · JPL
209713	2005 EP_{95}	—	March 11, 2005	Mayhill	Lowe, A.	·	1.4 km	MPC · JPL
209714	2005 EA_{100}	—	March 3, 2005	Catalina	CSS	·	1.5 km	MPC · JPL
209715	2005 EX_{100}	—	March 3, 2005	Catalina	CSS	·	1.5 km	MPC · JPL
209716	2005 EG_{103}	—	March 4, 2005	Kitt Peak	Spacewatch	(5)	1.4 km	MPC · JPL
209717	2005 ED_{124}	—	March 8, 2005	Anderson Mesa	LONEOS	·	2.1 km	MPC · JPL
209718	2005 EQ_{124}	—	March 8, 2005	Anderson Mesa	LONEOS	·	2.0 km	MPC · JPL
209719	2005 EX_{129}	—	March 9, 2005	Mount Lemmon	Mount Lemmon Survey	V	720 m	MPC · JPL
209720	2005 ER_{132}	—	March 9, 2005	Kitt Peak	Spacewatch	·	2.0 km	MPC · JPL
209721	2005 EP_{133}	—	March 9, 2005	Catalina	CSS	EUN	1.5 km	MPC · JPL
209722	2005 EB_{136}	—	March 9, 2005	Anderson Mesa	LONEOS	·	3.3 km	MPC · JPL
209723	2005 EK_{141}	—	March 10, 2005	Mount Lemmon	Mount Lemmon Survey	NYS	1.5 km	MPC · JPL
209724	2005 EV_{146}	—	March 10, 2005	Mount Lemmon	Mount Lemmon Survey	·	1.9 km	MPC · JPL
209725	2005 EZ_{150}	—	March 10, 2005	Kitt Peak	Spacewatch	HOF	3.3 km	MPC · JPL
209726	2005 EB_{156}	—	March 8, 2005	Mount Lemmon	Mount Lemmon Survey	·	1.6 km	MPC · JPL
209727	2005 EW_{160}	—	March 9, 2005	Mount Lemmon	Mount Lemmon Survey	·	4.2 km	MPC · JPL
209728	2005 EA_{161}	—	March 9, 2005	Mount Lemmon	Mount Lemmon Survey	AST	3.5 km	MPC · JPL
209729	2005 EF_{162}	—	March 9, 2005	Siding Spring	SSS	·	3.7 km	MPC · JPL
209730	2005 EA_{166}	—	March 11, 2005	Kitt Peak	Spacewatch	·	2.0 km	MPC · JPL
209731	2005 EX_{167}	—	March 11, 2005	Mount Lemmon	Mount Lemmon Survey	·	1.8 km	MPC · JPL
209732	2005 EX_{168}	—	March 11, 2005	Mount Lemmon	Mount Lemmon Survey	·	1.6 km	MPC · JPL
209733	2005 EE_{173}	—	March 8, 2005	Mount Lemmon	Mount Lemmon Survey	MAS	960 m	MPC · JPL
209734	2005 ED_{175}	—	March 8, 2005	Kitt Peak	Spacewatch	·	1.8 km	MPC · JPL
209735	2005 EG_{175}	—	March 8, 2005	Kitt Peak	Spacewatch	AGN	1.5 km	MPC · JPL
209736	2005 EV_{180}	—	March 9, 2005	Mount Lemmon	Mount Lemmon Survey	V	940 m	MPC · JPL
209737	2005 EW_{182}	—	March 9, 2005	Mount Lemmon	Mount Lemmon Survey	·	1.7 km	MPC · JPL
209738	2005 ER_{183}	—	March 9, 2005	Mount Lemmon	Mount Lemmon Survey	·	1.9 km	MPC · JPL
209739	2005 EY_{184}	—	March 9, 2005	Kitt Peak	Spacewatch	·	2.9 km	MPC · JPL
209740	2005 ET_{185}	—	March 10, 2005	Anderson Mesa	LONEOS	·	2.5 km	MPC · JPL
209741	2005 EE_{186}	—	March 10, 2005	Catalina	CSS	·	2.2 km	MPC · JPL
209742	2005 EW_{195}	—	March 11, 2005	Mount Lemmon	Mount Lemmon Survey	·	1.9 km	MPC · JPL
209743	2005 EH_{197}	—	March 11, 2005	Socorro	LINEAR	·	2.2 km	MPC · JPL
209744	2005 EX_{197}	—	March 11, 2005	Mount Lemmon	Mount Lemmon Survey	·	3.8 km	MPC · JPL
209745	2005 EA_{198}	—	March 11, 2005	Mount Lemmon	Mount Lemmon Survey	·	2.3 km	MPC · JPL
209746	2005 ES_{198}	—	March 11, 2005	Mount Lemmon	Mount Lemmon Survey	·	1.4 km	MPC · JPL
209747	2005 EU_{203}	—	March 11, 2005	Kitt Peak	Spacewatch	·	1.4 km	MPC · JPL
209748	2005 EG_{205}	—	March 12, 2005	Socorro	LINEAR	·	1.5 km	MPC · JPL
209749	2005 ES_{206}	—	March 13, 2005	Catalina	CSS	·	1.6 km	MPC · JPL
209750	2005 EZ_{206}	—	March 13, 2005	Kitt Peak	Spacewatch	·	2.0 km	MPC · JPL
209751	2005 EC_{208}	—	March 4, 2005	Kitt Peak	Spacewatch	PHO	1.7 km	MPC · JPL
209752	2005 EU_{210}	—	March 4, 2005	Kitt Peak	Spacewatch	NEM	3.2 km	MPC · JPL
209753	2005 EQ_{211}	—	March 4, 2005	Socorro	LINEAR	MAS	1.2 km	MPC · JPL
209754	2005 EZ_{216}	—	March 9, 2005	Anderson Mesa	LONEOS	·	1.3 km	MPC · JPL
209755	2005 ES_{218}	—	March 10, 2005	Mount Lemmon	Mount Lemmon Survey	NYS	1.7 km	MPC · JPL
209756	2005 EN_{220}	—	March 11, 2005	Kitt Peak	Spacewatch	·	2.4 km	MPC · JPL
209757	2005 EP_{224}	—	March 1, 2005	Catalina	CSS	HNS	1.6 km	MPC · JPL
209758	2005 EV_{233}	—	March 10, 2005	Anderson Mesa	LONEOS	HNS	1.7 km	MPC · JPL
209759	2005 EO_{235}	—	March 10, 2005	Mount Lemmon	Mount Lemmon Survey	·	1.7 km	MPC · JPL
209760	2005 EM_{240}	—	March 11, 2005	Kitt Peak	Spacewatch	·	1.3 km	MPC · JPL
209761	2005 EK_{245}	—	March 12, 2005	Kitt Peak	Spacewatch	·	1.9 km	MPC · JPL
209762	2005 EN_{245}	—	March 12, 2005	Kitt Peak	Spacewatch	·	1.8 km	MPC · JPL
209763	2005 EM_{253}	—	March 11, 2005	Anderson Mesa	LONEOS	BRG	2.0 km	MPC · JPL
209764	2005 EA_{254}	—	March 11, 2005	Mount Lemmon	Mount Lemmon Survey	·	1.8 km	MPC · JPL
209765	2005 EN_{258}	—	March 11, 2005	Mount Lemmon	Mount Lemmon Survey	(21344)	2.2 km	MPC · JPL
209766	2005 EN_{280}	—	March 10, 2005	Catalina	CSS	·	2.2 km	MPC · JPL
209767	2005 EV_{282}	—	March 10, 2005	Catalina	CSS	·	2.7 km	MPC · JPL
209768	2005 EG_{285}	—	March 12, 2005	Kitt Peak	Spacewatch	·	1.4 km	MPC · JPL
209769	2005 EH_{285}	—	March 12, 2005	Socorro	LINEAR	·	1.9 km	MPC · JPL
209770	2005 EM_{287}	—	March 7, 2005	Socorro	LINEAR	·	1.9 km	MPC · JPL
209771	2005 EB_{292}	—	March 10, 2005	Catalina	CSS	·	2.3 km	MPC · JPL
209772	2005 EN_{292}	—	March 10, 2005	Catalina	CSS	·	2.1 km	MPC · JPL
209773	2005 EV_{298}	—	March 11, 2005	Kitt Peak	M. W. Buie	·	1.1 km	MPC · JPL
209774	2005 EW_{317}	—	March 12, 2005	Kitt Peak	M. W. Buie	·	2.2 km	MPC · JPL
209775	2005 EG_{325}	—	March 4, 2005	Kitt Peak	Spacewatch	·	1.3 km	MPC · JPL
209776	2005 EZ_{326}	—	March 3, 2005	Catalina	CSS	PHO	1.1 km	MPC · JPL
209777	2005 FD_{6}	—	March 31, 2005	Anderson Mesa	LONEOS	·	2.0 km	MPC · JPL
209778	2005 GB_{1}	—	April 2, 2005	Ottmarsheim	Ottmarsheim	·	1.5 km	MPC · JPL
209779	2005 GS_{1}	—	April 1, 2005	Catalina	CSS	PHO	2.0 km	MPC · JPL
209780	2005 GV_{1}	—	April 1, 2005	Catalina	CSS	PHO	1.6 km	MPC · JPL
209781	2005 GB_{3}	—	April 1, 2005	Kitt Peak	Spacewatch	·	2.7 km	MPC · JPL
209782	2005 GN_{6}	—	April 1, 2005	Kitt Peak	Spacewatch	JUN	1.4 km	MPC · JPL
209783	2005 GV_{7}	—	April 1, 2005	Anderson Mesa	LONEOS	EUN	2.0 km	MPC · JPL
209784	2005 GD_{8}	—	April 2, 2005	Anderson Mesa	LONEOS	·	4.6 km	MPC · JPL
209785	2005 GQ_{8}	—	April 1, 2005	Reedy Creek	J. Broughton	·	3.2 km	MPC · JPL
209786	2005 GN_{10}	—	April 1, 2005	Kitt Peak	Spacewatch	·	2.4 km	MPC · JPL
209787	2005 GG_{11}	—	April 1, 2005	Anderson Mesa	LONEOS	·	3.8 km	MPC · JPL
209788	2005 GV_{13}	—	April 1, 2005	Anderson Mesa	LONEOS	·	2.6 km	MPC · JPL
209789	2005 GH_{21}	—	April 3, 2005	Palomar	NEAT	·	1.7 km	MPC · JPL
209790	2005 GJ_{21}	—	April 3, 2005	Palomar	NEAT	·	2.6 km	MPC · JPL
209791 Tokaj	2005 GU_{21}	Tokaj	April 1, 2005	Piszkéstető	K. Sárneczky	·	2.0 km	MPC · JPL
209792	2005 GL_{24}	—	April 2, 2005	Mount Lemmon	Mount Lemmon Survey	·	1.4 km	MPC · JPL
209793	2005 GR_{24}	—	April 2, 2005	Mount Lemmon	Mount Lemmon Survey	ERI	2.5 km	MPC · JPL
209794	2005 GZ_{26}	—	April 2, 2005	Kitt Peak	Spacewatch	EUN	1.9 km	MPC · JPL
209795	2005 GW_{33}	—	April 6, 2005	Mayhill	Lowe, A.	·	3.6 km	MPC · JPL
209796	2005 GW_{41}	—	April 5, 2005	Mount Lemmon	Mount Lemmon Survey	·	1.6 km	MPC · JPL
209797	2005 GO_{44}	—	April 5, 2005	Mount Lemmon	Mount Lemmon Survey	·	1.3 km	MPC · JPL
209798	2005 GZ_{48}	—	April 5, 2005	Mount Lemmon	Mount Lemmon Survey	·	1.5 km	MPC · JPL
209799	2005 GH_{49}	—	April 5, 2005	Mount Lemmon	Mount Lemmon Survey	·	1.5 km	MPC · JPL
209800	2005 GZ_{53}	—	April 4, 2005	Mount Lemmon	Mount Lemmon Survey	·	1.6 km	MPC · JPL

== 209801–209900 ==
back to top

Designation			Discovery			Properties		Ref
Permanent	Provisional	Named after	Date	Site	Discoverer(s)	Category	Diam.	Ref
209801	2005 GK_{55}	—	April 5, 2005	Mount Lemmon	Mount Lemmon Survey	HOF	3.6 km	MPC · JPL
209802	2005 GY_{58}	—	April 4, 2005	Catalina	CSS	·	3.0 km	MPC · JPL
209803	2005 GQ_{60}	—	April 6, 2005	Anderson Mesa	LONEOS	·	2.2 km	MPC · JPL
209804	2005 GS_{60}	—	April 6, 2005	Vail-Jarnac	Jarnac	·	2.1 km	MPC · JPL
209805	2005 GU_{60}	—	April 8, 2005	Needville	J. Dellinger, A. Lowe	·	1.5 km	MPC · JPL
209806	2005 GN_{63}	—	April 2, 2005	Catalina	CSS	EUN	1.4 km	MPC · JPL
209807	2005 GK_{66}	—	April 2, 2005	Mount Lemmon	Mount Lemmon Survey	·	2.1 km	MPC · JPL
209808	2005 GL_{66}	—	April 2, 2005	Mount Lemmon	Mount Lemmon Survey	AST	3.3 km	MPC · JPL
209809	2005 GD_{68}	—	April 2, 2005	Mount Lemmon	Mount Lemmon Survey	·	1.4 km	MPC · JPL
209810	2005 GK_{72}	—	April 4, 2005	Catalina	CSS	·	2.0 km	MPC · JPL
209811	2005 GW_{77}	—	April 6, 2005	Catalina	CSS	·	2.5 km	MPC · JPL
209812	2005 GN_{78}	—	April 6, 2005	Catalina	CSS	EUN	1.9 km	MPC · JPL
209813	2005 GZ_{79}	—	April 7, 2005	Anderson Mesa	LONEOS	·	2.5 km	MPC · JPL
209814	2005 GB_{80}	—	April 7, 2005	Mount Lemmon	Mount Lemmon Survey	·	1.5 km	MPC · JPL
209815	2005 GC_{86}	—	April 4, 2005	Catalina	CSS	·	2.5 km	MPC · JPL
209816	2005 GY_{88}	—	April 5, 2005	Catalina	CSS	EUN	1.9 km	MPC · JPL
209817	2005 GH_{89}	—	April 5, 2005	Mount Lemmon	Mount Lemmon Survey	(12739)	2.1 km	MPC · JPL
209818	2005 GE_{96}	—	April 6, 2005	Kitt Peak	Spacewatch	MIS	3.2 km	MPC · JPL
209819	2005 GY_{99}	—	April 8, 2005	Socorro	LINEAR	·	2.8 km	MPC · JPL
209820	2005 GB_{102}	—	April 9, 2005	Socorro	LINEAR	·	2.0 km	MPC · JPL
209821	2005 GB_{103}	—	April 9, 2005	Kitt Peak	Spacewatch	·	2.5 km	MPC · JPL
209822	2005 GM_{111}	—	April 5, 2005	Mount Lemmon	Mount Lemmon Survey	·	2.3 km	MPC · JPL
209823	2005 GL_{114}	—	April 10, 2005	Mount Lemmon	Mount Lemmon Survey	·	2.3 km	MPC · JPL
209824	2005 GP_{133}	—	April 10, 2005	Kitt Peak	Spacewatch	·	3.6 km	MPC · JPL
209825	2005 GV_{136}	—	April 10, 2005	Kitt Peak	Spacewatch	·	3.4 km	MPC · JPL
209826	2005 GC_{137}	—	April 11, 2005	Kitt Peak	Spacewatch	·	1.8 km	MPC · JPL
209827	2005 GP_{138}	—	April 12, 2005	Kitt Peak	Spacewatch	·	2.3 km	MPC · JPL
209828	2005 GY_{138}	—	April 12, 2005	Socorro	LINEAR	·	1.7 km	MPC · JPL
209829	2005 GH_{140}	—	April 13, 2005	Socorro	LINEAR	·	2.1 km	MPC · JPL
209830	2005 GU_{140}	—	April 13, 2005	Catalina	CSS	(194)	1.8 km	MPC · JPL
209831	2005 GS_{145}	—	April 11, 2005	Kitt Peak	Spacewatch	·	1.7 km	MPC · JPL
209832	2005 GB_{147}	—	April 11, 2005	Kitt Peak	Spacewatch	·	1.8 km	MPC · JPL
209833	2005 GS_{151}	—	April 12, 2005	Kitt Peak	Spacewatch	·	2.5 km	MPC · JPL
209834	2005 GS_{152}	—	April 12, 2005	Kitt Peak	Spacewatch	·	2.3 km	MPC · JPL
209835	2005 GE_{153}	—	April 13, 2005	Anderson Mesa	LONEOS	GEF	2.0 km	MPC · JPL
209836	2005 GJ_{153}	—	April 13, 2005	Kitt Peak	Spacewatch	·	1.9 km	MPC · JPL
209837	2005 GH_{154}	—	April 8, 2005	Socorro	LINEAR	·	2.7 km	MPC · JPL
209838	2005 GS_{154}	—	April 10, 2005	Mount Lemmon	Mount Lemmon Survey	MIS	2.8 km	MPC · JPL
209839	2005 GM_{155}	—	April 10, 2005	Mount Lemmon	Mount Lemmon Survey	·	1.8 km	MPC · JPL
209840	2005 GE_{161}	—	April 13, 2005	Socorro	LINEAR	·	3.8 km	MPC · JPL
209841	2005 GG_{163}	—	April 10, 2005	Catalina	CSS	EUN	1.8 km	MPC · JPL
209842	2005 GX_{164}	—	April 10, 2005	Mount Lemmon	Mount Lemmon Survey	·	3.0 km	MPC · JPL
209843	2005 GC_{167}	—	April 11, 2005	Mount Lemmon	Mount Lemmon Survey	KOR	1.9 km	MPC · JPL
209844	2005 GK_{169}	—	April 12, 2005	Kitt Peak	Spacewatch	·	3.1 km	MPC · JPL
209845	2005 GO_{173}	—	April 14, 2005	Kitt Peak	Spacewatch	·	3.9 km	MPC · JPL
209846	2005 GY_{202}	—	April 6, 2005	Mount Lemmon	Mount Lemmon Survey	·	1.8 km	MPC · JPL
209847	2005 GG_{210}	—	April 9, 2005	Catalina	CSS	·	2.8 km	MPC · JPL
209848	2005 HU_{4}	—	April 30, 2005	Kitt Peak	Spacewatch	·	1.9 km	MPC · JPL
209849	2005 HD_{9}	—	April 30, 2005	Kitt Peak	Spacewatch	·	2.5 km	MPC · JPL
209850	2005 JJ	—	May 1, 2005	Kitt Peak	Spacewatch	·	4.5 km	MPC · JPL
209851	2005 JF_{2}	—	May 2, 2005	Kitt Peak	Spacewatch	AGN	1.7 km	MPC · JPL
209852	2005 JS_{20}	—	May 4, 2005	Catalina	CSS	·	3.0 km	MPC · JPL
209853	2005 JS_{25}	—	May 3, 2005	Catalina	CSS	·	2.4 km	MPC · JPL
209854	2005 JB_{26}	—	May 3, 2005	Kitt Peak	Spacewatch	·	2.6 km	MPC · JPL
209855	2005 JQ_{27}	—	May 3, 2005	Catalina	CSS	·	3.3 km	MPC · JPL
209856	2005 JL_{28}	—	May 3, 2005	Kitt Peak	Spacewatch	·	2.9 km	MPC · JPL
209857	2005 JQ_{28}	—	May 3, 2005	Kitt Peak	Spacewatch	·	2.9 km	MPC · JPL
209858	2005 JG_{30}	—	May 4, 2005	Palomar	NEAT	·	3.4 km	MPC · JPL
209859	2005 JZ_{32}	—	May 4, 2005	Socorro	LINEAR	·	3.0 km	MPC · JPL
209860	2005 JX_{34}	—	May 4, 2005	Palomar	NEAT	·	2.7 km	MPC · JPL
209861	2005 JD_{37}	—	May 4, 2005	Siding Spring	SSS	·	3.9 km	MPC · JPL
209862	2005 JJ_{37}	—	May 5, 2005	Palomar	NEAT	·	4.6 km	MPC · JPL
209863	2005 JB_{39}	—	May 7, 2005	Kitt Peak	Spacewatch	·	1.9 km	MPC · JPL
209864	2005 JW_{50}	—	May 4, 2005	Kitt Peak	Spacewatch	AGN	1.7 km	MPC · JPL
209865	2005 JT_{58}	—	May 8, 2005	Kitt Peak	Spacewatch	AGN	1.3 km	MPC · JPL
209866	2005 JK_{64}	—	May 4, 2005	Palomar	NEAT	EUN	2.0 km	MPC · JPL
209867	2005 JH_{66}	—	May 4, 2005	Mount Lemmon	Mount Lemmon Survey	AST	2.4 km	MPC · JPL
209868	2005 JV_{66}	—	May 4, 2005	Palomar	NEAT	·	3.0 km	MPC · JPL
209869	2005 JU_{68}	—	May 6, 2005	Socorro	LINEAR	·	2.7 km	MPC · JPL
209870	2005 JV_{68}	—	May 6, 2005	Socorro	LINEAR	·	2.7 km	MPC · JPL
209871	2005 JZ_{68}	—	May 6, 2005	Socorro	LINEAR	·	3.1 km	MPC · JPL
209872	2005 JE_{77}	—	May 10, 2005	Anderson Mesa	LONEOS	·	2.6 km	MPC · JPL
209873	2005 JL_{82}	—	May 6, 2005	Catalina	CSS	ADE	3.9 km	MPC · JPL
209874	2005 JY_{88}	—	May 11, 2005	Palomar	NEAT	·	2.9 km	MPC · JPL
209875	2005 JW_{90}	—	May 11, 2005	Palomar	NEAT	·	2.8 km	MPC · JPL
209876	2005 JV_{115}	—	May 10, 2005	Kitt Peak	Spacewatch	·	2.5 km	MPC · JPL
209877	2005 JV_{138}	—	May 13, 2005	Mount Lemmon	Mount Lemmon Survey	KOR	2.0 km	MPC · JPL
209878	2005 JM_{140}	—	May 14, 2005	Mount Lemmon	Mount Lemmon Survey	·	1.9 km	MPC · JPL
209879	2005 JX_{146}	—	May 14, 2005	Kitt Peak	Spacewatch	·	4.4 km	MPC · JPL
209880	2005 JL_{150}	—	May 3, 2005	Kitt Peak	Spacewatch	HOF	3.1 km	MPC · JPL
209881	2005 JQ_{158}	—	May 6, 2005	Catalina	CSS	·	2.2 km	MPC · JPL
209882	2005 JW_{163}	—	May 9, 2005	Anderson Mesa	LONEOS	·	2.7 km	MPC · JPL
209883 Jasonhofgartner	2005 JZ_{170}	Jasonhofgartner	May 10, 2005	Cerro Tololo	M. W. Buie	·	2.1 km	MPC · JPL
209884	2005 JP_{180}	—	May 11, 2005	Catalina	CSS	·	3.0 km	MPC · JPL
209885	2005 JF_{185}	—	May 14, 2005	Mount Lemmon	Mount Lemmon Survey	HYG	3.0 km	MPC · JPL
209886	2005 KP_{1}	—	May 16, 2005	Mount Lemmon	Mount Lemmon Survey	·	2.7 km	MPC · JPL
209887	2005 LB_{1}	—	June 1, 2005	Reedy Creek	J. Broughton	·	4.0 km	MPC · JPL
209888	2005 LY_{6}	—	June 1, 2005	Kitt Peak	Spacewatch	·	4.5 km	MPC · JPL
209889	2005 LZ_{6}	—	June 1, 2005	Kitt Peak	Spacewatch	·	3.6 km	MPC · JPL
209890	2005 LL_{7}	—	June 3, 2005	Catalina	CSS	·	3.8 km	MPC · JPL
209891	2005 LK_{15}	—	June 3, 2005	Kitt Peak	Spacewatch	·	2.4 km	MPC · JPL
209892	2005 LA_{21}	—	June 5, 2005	Socorro	LINEAR	·	1.8 km	MPC · JPL
209893	2005 LZ_{25}	—	June 8, 2005	Kitt Peak	Spacewatch	TEL	2.1 km	MPC · JPL
209894	2005 LA_{29}	—	June 10, 2005	Kitt Peak	Spacewatch	KOR	1.9 km	MPC · JPL
209895	2005 LL_{30}	—	June 12, 2005	Kitt Peak	Spacewatch	·	4.4 km	MPC · JPL
209896	2005 MK_{10}	—	June 27, 2005	Kitt Peak	Spacewatch	HYG	3.9 km	MPC · JPL
209897	2005 MV_{14}	—	June 29, 2005	Anderson Mesa	LONEOS	·	5.6 km	MPC · JPL
209898	2005 MY_{20}	—	June 30, 2005	Catalina	CSS	·	3.9 km	MPC · JPL
209899	2005 MZ_{29}	—	June 29, 2005	Kitt Peak	Spacewatch	HYG	3.7 km	MPC · JPL
209900	2005 MH_{42}	—	June 29, 2005	Kitt Peak	Spacewatch	·	4.2 km	MPC · JPL

== 209901–210000 ==
back to top

Designation			Discovery			Properties		Ref
Permanent	Provisional	Named after	Date	Site	Discoverer(s)	Category	Diam.	Ref
209901	2005 MF_{45}	—	June 27, 2005	Kitt Peak	Spacewatch	H	970 m	MPC · JPL
209902	2005 MW_{47}	—	June 29, 2005	Kitt Peak	Spacewatch	·	3.8 km	MPC · JPL
209903	2005 MX_{48}	—	June 29, 2005	Palomar	NEAT	THM	4.9 km	MPC · JPL
209904	2005 NK	—	July 1, 2005	Catalina	CSS	·	4.9 km	MPC · JPL
209905	2005 NC_{2}	—	July 2, 2005	Kitt Peak	Spacewatch	THM	3.0 km	MPC · JPL
209906	2005 NM_{4}	—	July 2, 2005	Kitt Peak	Spacewatch	·	3.3 km	MPC · JPL
209907	2005 NB_{5}	—	July 3, 2005	Mount Lemmon	Mount Lemmon Survey	·	3.3 km	MPC · JPL
209908	2005 NZ_{12}	—	July 4, 2005	Palomar	NEAT	THM	3.9 km	MPC · JPL
209909	2005 NH_{26}	—	July 5, 2005	Kitt Peak	Spacewatch	·	2.7 km	MPC · JPL
209910	2005 NM_{31}	—	July 4, 2005	Palomar	NEAT	·	2.4 km	MPC · JPL
209911	2005 NU_{54}	—	July 10, 2005	Kitt Peak	Spacewatch	·	3.1 km	MPC · JPL
209912	2005 NY_{61}	—	July 11, 2005	Kitt Peak	Spacewatch	THM	2.8 km	MPC · JPL
209913	2005 NS_{87}	—	July 4, 2005	Kitt Peak	Spacewatch	·	4.0 km	MPC · JPL
209914	2005 NC_{101}	—	July 9, 2005	Catalina	CSS	·	4.4 km	MPC · JPL
209915	2005 PS_{2}	—	August 2, 2005	Socorro	LINEAR	THB	7.4 km	MPC · JPL
209916	2005 PJ_{18}	—	August 10, 2005	Reedy Creek	J. Broughton	·	5.8 km	MPC · JPL
209917	2005 QA_{11}	—	August 27, 2005	Junk Bond	D. Healy	·	3.5 km	MPC · JPL
209918	2005 QY_{30}	—	August 28, 2005	Junk Bond	D. Healy	·	4.7 km	MPC · JPL
209919	2005 QQ_{44}	—	August 26, 2005	Palomar	NEAT	3:2 · SHU	8.9 km	MPC · JPL
209920	2005 SN_{2}	—	September 23, 2005	Kitt Peak	Spacewatch	3:2	7.5 km	MPC · JPL
209921	2005 SF_{182}	—	September 29, 2005	Kitt Peak	Spacewatch	·	2.8 km	MPC · JPL
209922	2005 UX_{93}	—	October 22, 2005	Kitt Peak	Spacewatch	·	1.4 km	MPC · JPL
209923	2005 UX_{504}	—	October 24, 2005	Mauna Kea	D. J. Tholen	·	1.3 km	MPC · JPL
209924	2005 WS_{55}	—	November 22, 2005	Palomar	NEAT	AMO +1km	1.9 km	MPC · JPL
209925	2005 WH_{74}	—	November 26, 2005	Catalina	CSS	H	970 m	MPC · JPL
209926	2005 XE	—	December 1, 2005	Kitt Peak	Spacewatch	H	970 m	MPC · JPL
209927	2005 YQ_{8}	—	December 23, 2005	Socorro	LINEAR	H	1.3 km	MPC · JPL
209928	2005 YX_{94}	—	December 24, 2005	Socorro	LINEAR	H	940 m	MPC · JPL
209929	2005 YD_{288}	—	December 30, 2005	Catalina	CSS	H	740 m	MPC · JPL
209930	2006 BQ	—	January 20, 2006	Socorro	LINEAR	H	990 m	MPC · JPL
209931	2006 BT_{2}	—	January 20, 2006	Catalina	CSS	H	900 m	MPC · JPL
209932	2006 BO_{32}	—	January 21, 2006	Kitt Peak	Spacewatch	NYS	1.6 km	MPC · JPL
209933	2006 BH_{150}	—	January 24, 2006	Anderson Mesa	LONEOS	H	940 m	MPC · JPL
209934	2006 BH_{157}	—	January 25, 2006	Kitt Peak	Spacewatch	·	900 m	MPC · JPL
209935	2006 BD_{227}	—	January 30, 2006	Kitt Peak	Spacewatch	NYS	1.5 km	MPC · JPL
209936	2006 CT_{65}	—	February 1, 2006	Mount Lemmon	Mount Lemmon Survey	(2076)	1.3 km	MPC · JPL
209937	2006 DX_{13}	—	February 22, 2006	Catalina	CSS	·	900 m	MPC · JPL
209938	2006 DQ_{34}	—	February 20, 2006	Kitt Peak	Spacewatch	·	1.3 km	MPC · JPL
209939	2006 DX_{34}	—	February 20, 2006	Kitt Peak	Spacewatch	·	1.4 km	MPC · JPL
209940	2006 DZ_{34}	—	February 20, 2006	Kitt Peak	Spacewatch	·	1.3 km	MPC · JPL
209941	2006 DD_{35}	—	February 20, 2006	Kitt Peak	Spacewatch	·	990 m	MPC · JPL
209942	2006 DG_{60}	—	February 24, 2006	Kitt Peak	Spacewatch	·	1.1 km	MPC · JPL
209943	2006 DZ_{64}	—	February 20, 2006	Catalina	CSS	·	1.9 km	MPC · JPL
209944	2006 DV_{71}	—	February 21, 2006	Mount Lemmon	Mount Lemmon Survey	·	1.0 km	MPC · JPL
209945	2006 DU_{94}	—	February 24, 2006	Kitt Peak	Spacewatch	·	1.3 km	MPC · JPL
209946	2006 DA_{98}	—	February 24, 2006	Kitt Peak	Spacewatch	·	2.1 km	MPC · JPL
209947	2006 EZ_{16}	—	March 2, 2006	Mount Lemmon	Mount Lemmon Survey	·	1.2 km	MPC · JPL
209948	2006 FG_{1}	—	March 21, 2006	Mount Lemmon	Mount Lemmon Survey	·	740 m	MPC · JPL
209949	2006 FH_{12}	—	March 23, 2006	Kitt Peak	Spacewatch	·	1.0 km	MPC · JPL
209950	2006 FH_{18}	—	March 23, 2006	Kitt Peak	Spacewatch	·	750 m	MPC · JPL
209951	2006 FD_{28}	—	March 24, 2006	Mount Lemmon	Mount Lemmon Survey	·	1.3 km	MPC · JPL
209952	2006 FA_{30}	—	March 24, 2006	Mount Lemmon	Mount Lemmon Survey	·	1.3 km	MPC · JPL
209953	2006 FG_{37}	—	March 24, 2006	Socorro	LINEAR	·	1.1 km	MPC · JPL
209954	2006 FJ_{41}	—	March 26, 2006	Mount Lemmon	Mount Lemmon Survey	·	960 m	MPC · JPL
209955	2006 FA_{45}	—	March 24, 2006	Mount Lemmon	Mount Lemmon Survey	·	910 m	MPC · JPL
209956	2006 GH_{2}	—	April 2, 2006	Kitt Peak	Spacewatch	·	1.2 km	MPC · JPL
209957	2006 GW_{3}	—	April 2, 2006	Kitt Peak	Spacewatch	·	1.2 km	MPC · JPL
209958	2006 GD_{22}	—	April 2, 2006	Kitt Peak	Spacewatch	·	970 m	MPC · JPL
209959	2006 GR_{26}	—	April 2, 2006	Kitt Peak	Spacewatch	·	900 m	MPC · JPL
209960	2006 GC_{28}	—	April 2, 2006	Kitt Peak	Spacewatch	AGN	1.7 km	MPC · JPL
209961	2006 GD_{32}	—	April 6, 2006	Kitt Peak	Spacewatch	V	990 m	MPC · JPL
209962	2006 GT_{34}	—	April 7, 2006	Catalina	CSS	·	910 m	MPC · JPL
209963	2006 GG_{41}	—	April 7, 2006	Catalina	CSS	·	1.3 km	MPC · JPL
209964	2006 GJ_{46}	—	April 8, 2006	Kitt Peak	Spacewatch	·	1.7 km	MPC · JPL
209965	2006 GN_{50}	—	April 9, 2006	Siding Spring	SSS	·	930 m	MPC · JPL
209966	2006 GC_{54}	—	April 7, 2006	Kitt Peak	Spacewatch	·	880 m	MPC · JPL
209967	2006 HU	—	April 18, 2006	Kitt Peak	Spacewatch	·	1.1 km	MPC · JPL
209968	2006 HF_{2}	—	April 18, 2006	Anderson Mesa	LONEOS	·	830 m	MPC · JPL
209969	2006 HT_{10}	—	April 19, 2006	Kitt Peak	Spacewatch	V	1.2 km	MPC · JPL
209970	2006 HH_{11}	—	April 19, 2006	Kitt Peak	Spacewatch	·	1.5 km	MPC · JPL
209971	2006 HE_{21}	—	April 20, 2006	Kitt Peak	Spacewatch	·	990 m	MPC · JPL
209972	2006 HM_{25}	—	April 20, 2006	Kitt Peak	Spacewatch	NYS	1.6 km	MPC · JPL
209973	2006 HN_{25}	—	April 20, 2006	Kitt Peak	Spacewatch	·	1.3 km	MPC · JPL
209974	2006 HZ_{32}	—	April 19, 2006	Mount Lemmon	Mount Lemmon Survey	·	840 m	MPC · JPL
209975	2006 HY_{34}	—	April 19, 2006	Palomar	NEAT	·	1.1 km	MPC · JPL
209976	2006 HQ_{39}	—	April 21, 2006	Kitt Peak	Spacewatch	·	1.7 km	MPC · JPL
209977	2006 HO_{42}	—	April 23, 2006	Socorro	LINEAR	·	1.1 km	MPC · JPL
209978	2006 HD_{44}	—	April 24, 2006	Kitt Peak	Spacewatch	·	1.6 km	MPC · JPL
209979	2006 HT_{44}	—	April 24, 2006	Socorro	LINEAR	(2076)	1.2 km	MPC · JPL
209980	2006 HC_{55}	—	April 21, 2006	Catalina	CSS	MAS	1.0 km	MPC · JPL
209981	2006 HM_{55}	—	April 23, 2006	Socorro	LINEAR	·	1.8 km	MPC · JPL
209982	2006 HJ_{57}	—	April 24, 2006	Socorro	LINEAR	·	1.1 km	MPC · JPL
209983	2006 HW_{60}	—	April 28, 2006	Socorro	LINEAR	·	1.0 km	MPC · JPL
209984	2006 HY_{64}	—	April 24, 2006	Kitt Peak	Spacewatch	·	1.3 km	MPC · JPL
209985	2006 HB_{71}	—	April 25, 2006	Kitt Peak	Spacewatch	·	1.7 km	MPC · JPL
209986	2006 HV_{78}	—	April 26, 2006	Kitt Peak	Spacewatch	·	990 m	MPC · JPL
209987	2006 HG_{84}	—	April 26, 2006	Kitt Peak	Spacewatch	·	2.3 km	MPC · JPL
209988	2006 HL_{86}	—	April 27, 2006	Kitt Peak	Spacewatch	·	1.1 km	MPC · JPL
209989	2006 HU_{90}	—	April 29, 2006	Kitt Peak	Spacewatch	·	770 m	MPC · JPL
209990	2006 HV_{97}	—	April 30, 2006	Kitt Peak	Spacewatch	KOR	1.7 km	MPC · JPL
209991	2006 HU_{102}	—	April 30, 2006	Kitt Peak	Spacewatch	·	1.2 km	MPC · JPL
209992	2006 HM_{113}	—	April 25, 2006	Kitt Peak	Spacewatch	(5)	1.5 km	MPC · JPL
209993	2006 HB_{122}	—	April 30, 2006	Kitt Peak	Spacewatch	EUN	1.8 km	MPC · JPL
209994	2006 JL	—	May 1, 2006	Reedy Creek	J. Broughton	·	1.3 km	MPC · JPL
209995	2006 JG_{2}	—	May 1, 2006	Socorro	LINEAR	·	860 m	MPC · JPL
209996	2006 JS_{14}	—	May 1, 2006	Socorro	LINEAR	·	1.5 km	MPC · JPL
209997	2006 JN_{16}	—	May 2, 2006	Kitt Peak	Spacewatch	NYS	1.3 km	MPC · JPL
209998	2006 JP_{19}	—	May 2, 2006	Mount Lemmon	Mount Lemmon Survey	·	950 m	MPC · JPL
209999	2006 JS_{19}	—	May 2, 2006	Mount Lemmon	Mount Lemmon Survey	·	2.0 km	MPC · JPL
210000	2006 JJ_{21}	—	May 2, 2006	Kitt Peak	Spacewatch	·	1.8 km	MPC · JPL

back to top

== See also ==
- Meanings of minor-planet names: 209001–210000
