= List of minor planets: 208001–209000 =

The following is a partial list of minor planets, running from minor-planet number 208001 through 209000, inclusive. The primary data for this and other partial lists is based on JPL's "Small-Body Orbital Elements" and data available from the Minor Planet Center. Critical list information is also provided by the MPC, unless otherwise specified from Lowell Observatory. A detailed description of the table's columns and additional sources are given on the main page including a complete list of every page in this series, and a statistical break-up on the dynamical classification of minor planets.

Also see the summary list of all named bodies in numerical and alphabetical order, and the corresponding naming citations for the number range of this particular list. New namings may only be added to this list after official publication, as the preannouncement of names is condemned by the Working Group for Small Bodies Nomenclature of the International Astronomical Union.

Near-Earth obj.	MBA (inner)	MBA (outer)	Centaur
Mars-crosser	MBA (middle)	Jupiter trojan	Trans-Neptunian obj.
Unclassified

== 208001–208100 ==
Designation			Discovery			Properties		Ref
Permanent	Provisional	Named after	Date	Site	Discoverer(s)	Category	Diam.	Ref
208001	1998 HE_{140}	—	April 21, 1998	Socorro	LINEAR	·	2.0 km	MPC · JPL
208002	1998 MT_{43}	—	June 26, 1998	La Silla	E. W. Elst	EUN	2.9 km	MPC · JPL
208003	1998 OJ_{11}	—	July 26, 1998	La Silla	E. W. Elst	·	970 m	MPC · JPL
208004	1998 OO_{13}	—	July 26, 1998	La Silla	E. W. Elst	·	2.2 km	MPC · JPL
208005	1998 QO_{5}	—	August 19, 1998	Socorro	LINEAR	·	4.9 km	MPC · JPL
208006	1998 QW_{76}	—	August 24, 1998	Socorro	LINEAR	·	2.4 km	MPC · JPL
208007	1998 QD_{91}	—	August 28, 1998	Socorro	LINEAR	·	2.8 km	MPC · JPL
208008	1998 RR_{27}	—	September 14, 1998	Socorro	LINEAR	·	1.6 km	MPC · JPL
208009	1998 SH_{42}	—	September 27, 1998	Kitt Peak	Spacewatch	·	2.4 km	MPC · JPL
208010	1998 SB_{61}	—	September 17, 1998	Anderson Mesa	LONEOS	·	2.8 km	MPC · JPL
208011	1998 SV_{85}	—	September 26, 1998	Socorro	LINEAR	MAR	1.7 km	MPC · JPL
208012	1998 SX_{87}	—	September 26, 1998	Socorro	LINEAR	·	4.1 km	MPC · JPL
208013	1998 SY_{119}	—	September 26, 1998	Socorro	LINEAR	·	1.9 km	MPC · JPL
208014	1998 SH_{154}	—	September 26, 1998	Socorro	LINEAR	·	2.6 km	MPC · JPL
208015	1998 SM_{160}	—	September 26, 1998	Socorro	LINEAR	T_{j} (2.93)	6.5 km	MPC · JPL
208016	1998 TK_{11}	—	October 13, 1998	Kitt Peak	Spacewatch	MRX	1.5 km	MPC · JPL
208017	1998 TX_{20}	—	October 13, 1998	Kitt Peak	Spacewatch	·	2.6 km	MPC · JPL
208018	1998 TS_{28}	—	October 15, 1998	Kitt Peak	Spacewatch	·	2.2 km	MPC · JPL
208019	1998 UL_{13}	—	October 22, 1998	Kitt Peak	Spacewatch	·	1.6 km	MPC · JPL
208020	1998 UN_{13}	—	October 22, 1998	Kitt Peak	Spacewatch	·	2.0 km	MPC · JPL
208021	1998 WU_{41}	—	November 24, 1998	Socorro	LINEAR	·	3.1 km	MPC · JPL
208022	1998 XG_{19}	—	December 10, 1998	Kitt Peak	Spacewatch	·	2.7 km	MPC · JPL
208023	1999 AQ_{10}	—	January 14, 1999	Socorro	LINEAR	ATE · PHA	280 m	MPC · JPL
208024	1999 AF_{18}	—	January 11, 1999	Kitt Peak	Spacewatch	·	970 m	MPC · JPL
208025	1999 FQ_{16}	—	March 22, 1999	Kitt Peak	Spacewatch	·	1.9 km	MPC · JPL
208026	1999 JD_{74}	—	May 12, 1999	Socorro	LINEAR	·	1.2 km	MPC · JPL
208027	1999 JQ_{77}	—	May 12, 1999	Socorro	LINEAR	·	1.2 km	MPC · JPL
208028	1999 JY_{119}	—	May 13, 1999	Socorro	LINEAR	·	1.2 km	MPC · JPL
208029	1999 LJ_{2}	—	June 8, 1999	Socorro	LINEAR	·	4.0 km	MPC · JPL
208030	1999 LS_{33}	—	June 11, 1999	Catalina	CSS	·	1.7 km	MPC · JPL
208031	1999 NE_{23}	—	July 14, 1999	Socorro	LINEAR	·	1.8 km	MPC · JPL
208032	1999 NH_{30}	—	July 14, 1999	Socorro	LINEAR	·	1.8 km	MPC · JPL
208033	1999 QR	—	August 20, 1999	Kleť	Kleť	·	2.3 km	MPC · JPL
208034	1999 RT_{28}	—	September 8, 1999	Heppenheim	Starkenburg	EUN	1.8 km	MPC · JPL
208035	1999 RV_{34}	—	September 11, 1999	Ondřejov	P. Kušnirák, P. Pravec	·	1.9 km	MPC · JPL
208036	1999 RR_{43}	—	September 14, 1999	Prescott	P. G. Comba	·	1.4 km	MPC · JPL
208037	1999 RB_{49}	—	September 7, 1999	Socorro	LINEAR	EUP	6.8 km	MPC · JPL
208038	1999 RL_{81}	—	September 7, 1999	Socorro	LINEAR	·	2.1 km	MPC · JPL
208039	1999 RV_{113}	—	September 9, 1999	Socorro	LINEAR	PHO	3.9 km	MPC · JPL
208040	1999 RS_{137}	—	September 9, 1999	Socorro	LINEAR	·	2.7 km	MPC · JPL
208041	1999 RE_{166}	—	September 9, 1999	Socorro	LINEAR	·	2.8 km	MPC · JPL
208042	1999 RR_{185}	—	September 9, 1999	Socorro	LINEAR	V	1.1 km	MPC · JPL
208043	1999 RW_{190}	—	September 14, 1999	Kitt Peak	Spacewatch	MIS	3.2 km	MPC · JPL
208044	1999 RE_{218}	—	September 4, 1999	Catalina	CSS	·	2.1 km	MPC · JPL
208045	1999 RT_{222}	—	September 7, 1999	Socorro	LINEAR	·	1.9 km	MPC · JPL
208046	1999 TC_{55}	—	October 6, 1999	Kitt Peak	Spacewatch	·	1.2 km	MPC · JPL
208047	1999 TJ_{112}	—	October 4, 1999	Socorro	LINEAR	NYS	1.6 km	MPC · JPL
208048	1999 TL_{149}	—	October 7, 1999	Socorro	LINEAR	ERI	2.9 km	MPC · JPL
208049	1999 TM_{157}	—	October 9, 1999	Socorro	LINEAR	NYS	1.6 km	MPC · JPL
208050	1999 TF_{179}	—	October 10, 1999	Socorro	LINEAR	·	1.6 km	MPC · JPL
208051	1999 TJ_{180}	—	October 10, 1999	Socorro	LINEAR	BRG	3.1 km	MPC · JPL
208052	1999 TJ_{193}	—	October 12, 1999	Socorro	LINEAR	·	1.7 km	MPC · JPL
208053	1999 TW_{208}	—	October 14, 1999	Socorro	LINEAR	·	2.5 km	MPC · JPL
208054	1999 TB_{211}	—	October 15, 1999	Socorro	LINEAR	JUN	1.8 km	MPC · JPL
208055	1999 TK_{227}	—	October 1, 1999	Catalina	CSS	·	2.5 km	MPC · JPL
208056	1999 TK_{229}	—	October 4, 1999	Socorro	LINEAR	·	1.2 km	MPC · JPL
208057	1999 TT_{264}	—	October 3, 1999	Socorro	LINEAR	PHO	3.3 km	MPC · JPL
208058	1999 TC_{284}	—	October 9, 1999	Socorro	LINEAR	·	1.9 km	MPC · JPL
208059	1999 TK_{309}	—	October 6, 1999	Kitt Peak	Spacewatch	(5)	970 m	MPC · JPL
208060	1999 TS_{317}	—	October 12, 1999	Kitt Peak	Spacewatch	·	1.9 km	MPC · JPL
208061	1999 UP_{18}	—	October 30, 1999	Kitt Peak	Spacewatch	·	2.2 km	MPC · JPL
208062	1999 UP_{20}	—	October 31, 1999	Kitt Peak	Spacewatch	·	1.6 km	MPC · JPL
208063	1999 UM_{33}	—	October 31, 1999	Kitt Peak	Spacewatch	·	1.1 km	MPC · JPL
208064	1999 UV_{35}	—	October 31, 1999	Kitt Peak	Spacewatch	·	1.9 km	MPC · JPL
208065	1999 UX_{42}	—	October 28, 1999	Catalina	CSS	·	1.6 km	MPC · JPL
208066	1999 UQ_{53}	—	October 19, 1999	Kitt Peak	Spacewatch	·	1.4 km	MPC · JPL
208067	1999 VH_{19}	—	November 9, 1999	Višnjan	K. Korlević	·	5.7 km	MPC · JPL
208068	1999 VK_{48}	—	November 3, 1999	Socorro	LINEAR	EUN	1.9 km	MPC · JPL
208069	1999 VO_{58}	—	November 4, 1999	Socorro	LINEAR	·	1.8 km	MPC · JPL
208070	1999 VT_{72}	—	November 10, 1999	Uccle	E. W. Elst	·	1.8 km	MPC · JPL
208071	1999 VD_{73}	—	November 1, 1999	Kitt Peak	Spacewatch	·	1.1 km	MPC · JPL
208072	1999 VN_{91}	—	November 5, 1999	Socorro	LINEAR	·	2.4 km	MPC · JPL
208073	1999 VL_{98}	—	November 9, 1999	Socorro	LINEAR	(5)	1.8 km	MPC · JPL
208074	1999 VF_{100}	—	November 9, 1999	Socorro	LINEAR	·	1.3 km	MPC · JPL
208075	1999 VT_{124}	—	November 10, 1999	Kitt Peak	Spacewatch	·	1.2 km	MPC · JPL
208076	1999 VE_{158}	—	November 14, 1999	Socorro	LINEAR	(5)	1.6 km	MPC · JPL
208077	1999 VW_{163}	—	November 14, 1999	Socorro	LINEAR	·	1.6 km	MPC · JPL
208078	1999 VB_{167}	—	November 14, 1999	Socorro	LINEAR	(5)	1.7 km	MPC · JPL
208079	1999 VJ_{179}	—	November 6, 1999	Socorro	LINEAR	·	2.2 km	MPC · JPL
208080	1999 VV_{180}	—	November 7, 1999	Socorro	LINEAR	·	2.5 km	MPC · JPL
208081	1999 VG_{206}	—	November 12, 1999	Socorro	LINEAR	·	1.7 km	MPC · JPL
208082	1999 WH_{15}	—	November 29, 1999	Kitt Peak	Spacewatch	·	1.9 km	MPC · JPL
208083	1999 XN_{9}	—	December 2, 1999	Kitt Peak	Spacewatch	HNS	2.2 km	MPC · JPL
208084	1999 XB_{48}	—	December 7, 1999	Socorro	LINEAR	(5)	2.0 km	MPC · JPL
208085	1999 XL_{51}	—	December 7, 1999	Socorro	LINEAR	(5)	1.9 km	MPC · JPL
208086	1999 XO_{104}	—	December 7, 1999	Socorro	LINEAR	BAR	2.0 km	MPC · JPL
208087	1999 XK_{131}	—	December 12, 1999	Socorro	LINEAR	·	1.7 km	MPC · JPL
208088	1999 XX_{144}	—	December 6, 1999	Kitt Peak	Spacewatch	·	1.5 km	MPC · JPL
208089	1999 XD_{152}	—	December 8, 1999	Kitt Peak	Spacewatch	·	1.3 km	MPC · JPL
208090	1999 XL_{156}	—	December 8, 1999	Socorro	LINEAR	(5)	2.4 km	MPC · JPL
208091	1999 XM_{162}	—	December 13, 1999	Socorro	LINEAR	JUN	1.5 km	MPC · JPL
208092	1999 XO_{214}	—	December 14, 1999	Socorro	LINEAR	·	2.3 km	MPC · JPL
208093	1999 XS_{217}	—	December 13, 1999	Kitt Peak	Spacewatch	·	1.8 km	MPC · JPL
208094	1999 YC_{10}	—	December 27, 1999	Kitt Peak	Spacewatch	·	1.6 km	MPC · JPL
208095	2000 AB_{19}	—	January 3, 2000	Socorro	LINEAR	·	3.2 km	MPC · JPL
208096	2000 AT_{88}	—	January 5, 2000	Socorro	LINEAR	ADE	6.1 km	MPC · JPL
208097	2000 AC_{145}	—	January 6, 2000	Socorro	LINEAR	·	3.6 km	MPC · JPL
208098	2000 AV_{154}	—	January 3, 2000	Socorro	LINEAR	·	2.2 km	MPC · JPL
208099	2000 AO_{201}	—	January 9, 2000	Socorro	LINEAR	·	6.1 km	MPC · JPL
208100	2000 AC_{221}	—	January 8, 2000	Kitt Peak	Spacewatch	MAR	1.7 km	MPC · JPL

== 208101–208200 ==
back to top

Designation			Discovery			Properties		Ref
Permanent	Provisional	Named after	Date	Site	Discoverer(s)	Category	Diam.	Ref
208101	2000 AW_{246}	—	January 7, 2000	Kitt Peak	Spacewatch	·	2.1 km	MPC · JPL
208102	2000 BX_{2}	—	January 26, 2000	Višnjan	K. Korlević	·	2.5 km	MPC · JPL
208103	2000 BL_{6}	—	January 29, 2000	Socorro	LINEAR	BAR	2.3 km	MPC · JPL
208104	2000 BY_{8}	—	January 29, 2000	Socorro	LINEAR	·	2.4 km	MPC · JPL
208105	2000 BH_{12}	—	January 28, 2000	Kitt Peak	Spacewatch	ADE	3.4 km	MPC · JPL
208106	2000 BL_{20}	—	January 26, 2000	Kitt Peak	Spacewatch	·	1.9 km	MPC · JPL
208107	2000 BG_{21}	—	January 29, 2000	Kitt Peak	Spacewatch	·	1.8 km	MPC · JPL
208108	2000 BS_{42}	—	January 27, 2000	Kitt Peak	Spacewatch	WIT	1.3 km	MPC · JPL
208109	2000 BA_{50}	—	January 16, 2000	Kitt Peak	Spacewatch	·	1.7 km	MPC · JPL
208110	2000 CH_{13}	—	February 2, 2000	Socorro	LINEAR	·	2.0 km	MPC · JPL
208111	2000 CC_{25}	—	February 2, 2000	Socorro	LINEAR	HNS	1.8 km	MPC · JPL
208112	2000 CM_{69}	—	February 1, 2000	Kitt Peak	Spacewatch	·	3.8 km	MPC · JPL
208113	2000 CU_{73}	—	February 7, 2000	Kitt Peak	Spacewatch	EUN	1.7 km	MPC · JPL
208114	2000 CG_{99}	—	February 8, 2000	Kitt Peak	Spacewatch	·	2.2 km	MPC · JPL
208115	2000 CT_{101}	—	February 15, 2000	Socorro	LINEAR	APO · PHA	240 m	MPC · JPL
208116	2000 CD_{112}	—	February 7, 2000	Kitt Peak	Spacewatch	·	2.5 km	MPC · JPL
208117 Davidgerdes	2000 CJ_{119}	Davidgerdes	February 6, 2000	Kitt Peak	M. W. Buie	·	2.5 km	MPC · JPL
208118	2000 CM_{119}	—	February 6, 2000	Socorro	LINEAR	·	4.2 km	MPC · JPL
208119	2000 CE_{140}	—	February 5, 2000	Kitt Peak	Spacewatch	·	2.0 km	MPC · JPL
208120	2000 DG_{2}	—	February 26, 2000	Kitt Peak	Spacewatch	·	3.2 km	MPC · JPL
208121	2000 DT_{10}	—	February 26, 2000	Kitt Peak	Spacewatch	(11882)	2.1 km	MPC · JPL
208122	2000 DZ_{13}	—	February 28, 2000	Kitt Peak	Spacewatch	·	1.6 km	MPC · JPL
208123	2000 DB_{24}	—	February 29, 2000	Socorro	LINEAR	·	3.3 km	MPC · JPL
208124	2000 DS_{43}	—	February 29, 2000	Socorro	LINEAR	NEM	3.4 km	MPC · JPL
208125	2000 DC_{49}	—	February 29, 2000	Socorro	LINEAR	·	2.4 km	MPC · JPL
208126	2000 DB_{53}	—	February 29, 2000	Socorro	LINEAR	·	2.8 km	MPC · JPL
208127	2000 DU_{57}	—	February 29, 2000	Socorro	LINEAR	·	2.9 km	MPC · JPL
208128	2000 DF_{60}	—	February 29, 2000	Socorro	LINEAR	·	2.1 km	MPC · JPL
208129	2000 DX_{62}	—	February 29, 2000	Socorro	LINEAR	·	2.7 km	MPC · JPL
208130	2000 DH_{66}	—	February 29, 2000	Socorro	LINEAR	DOR	2.9 km	MPC · JPL
208131	2000 DE_{91}	—	February 27, 2000	Kitt Peak	Spacewatch	·	2.0 km	MPC · JPL
208132	2000 DO_{110}	—	February 25, 2000	Uccle	T. Pauwels	·	3.5 km	MPC · JPL
208133	2000 DE_{114}	—	February 27, 2000	Kitt Peak	Spacewatch	·	2.8 km	MPC · JPL
208134	2000 EN_{7}	—	March 3, 2000	Kitt Peak	Spacewatch	·	2.2 km	MPC · JPL
208135	2000 EF_{15}	—	March 2, 2000	San Marcello	L. Tesi, A. Boattini	·	2.0 km	MPC · JPL
208136	2000 EZ_{27}	—	March 4, 2000	Socorro	LINEAR	ADE	4.0 km	MPC · JPL
208137	2000 ES_{28}	—	March 4, 2000	Socorro	LINEAR	·	2.8 km	MPC · JPL
208138	2000 EL_{31}	—	March 5, 2000	Socorro	LINEAR	·	3.3 km	MPC · JPL
208139	2000 EP_{32}	—	March 5, 2000	Socorro	LINEAR	·	2.3 km	MPC · JPL
208140	2000 EJ_{34}	—	March 5, 2000	Socorro	LINEAR	KOR	2.5 km	MPC · JPL
208141	2000 EZ_{81}	—	March 5, 2000	Socorro	LINEAR	·	2.6 km	MPC · JPL
208142	2000 EL_{103}	—	March 12, 2000	Socorro	LINEAR	·	4.2 km	MPC · JPL
208143	2000 EG_{141}	—	March 2, 2000	Kitt Peak	Spacewatch	NEM	3.2 km	MPC · JPL
208144	2000 ET_{153}	—	March 6, 2000	Haleakala	NEAT	·	5.0 km	MPC · JPL
208145	2000 EX_{164}	—	March 3, 2000	Socorro	LINEAR	·	3.5 km	MPC · JPL
208146	2000 EL_{168}	—	March 4, 2000	Socorro	LINEAR	·	2.5 km	MPC · JPL
208147	2000 EH_{172}	—	March 10, 2000	Socorro	LINEAR	PAD	2.6 km	MPC · JPL
208148	2000 FK_{4}	—	March 27, 2000	Kitt Peak	Spacewatch	MRX	1.6 km	MPC · JPL
208149	2000 FL_{25}	—	March 27, 2000	Anderson Mesa	LONEOS	·	4.8 km	MPC · JPL
208150	2000 FJ_{34}	—	March 29, 2000	Socorro	LINEAR	·	3.3 km	MPC · JPL
208151	2000 FV_{67}	—	March 25, 2000	Kitt Peak	Spacewatch	AST	2.2 km	MPC · JPL
208152	2000 GL_{54}	—	April 5, 2000	Socorro	LINEAR	·	3.3 km	MPC · JPL
208153	2000 GK_{121}	—	April 6, 2000	Kitt Peak	Spacewatch	DOR	2.9 km	MPC · JPL
208154	2000 GS_{122}	—	April 8, 2000	Bergisch Gladbach	W. Bickel	EUN	1.8 km	MPC · JPL
208155	2000 GG_{158}	—	April 7, 2000	Anderson Mesa	LONEOS	·	3.0 km	MPC · JPL
208156	2000 GQ_{164}	—	April 5, 2000	Socorro	LINEAR	·	3.0 km	MPC · JPL
208157	2000 GF_{186}	—	April 5, 2000	Socorro	LINEAR	·	2.6 km	MPC · JPL
208158	2000 HC_{7}	—	April 25, 2000	Kitt Peak	Spacewatch	TIN	4.0 km	MPC · JPL
208159	2000 HU_{15}	—	April 30, 2000	Socorro	LINEAR	·	5.1 km	MPC · JPL
208160	2000 HF_{69}	—	April 24, 2000	Anderson Mesa	LONEOS	·	3.7 km	MPC · JPL
208161	2000 HN_{83}	—	April 30, 2000	Anderson Mesa	LONEOS	·	3.2 km	MPC · JPL
208162	2000 KG_{74}	—	May 27, 2000	Anderson Mesa	LONEOS	·	2.8 km	MPC · JPL
208163	2000 NL_{6}	—	July 3, 2000	Kitt Peak	Spacewatch	·	800 m	MPC · JPL
208164	2000 OO_{21}	—	July 30, 2000	Socorro	LINEAR	·	1.3 km	MPC · JPL
208165	2000 OL_{33}	—	July 30, 2000	Socorro	LINEAR	V	1.1 km	MPC · JPL
208166	2000 OB_{42}	—	July 30, 2000	Socorro	LINEAR	V	1.1 km	MPC · JPL
208167	2000 OQ_{60}	—	July 29, 2000	Anderson Mesa	LONEOS	NYS	1.2 km	MPC · JPL
208168	2000 PH_{18}	—	August 1, 2000	Socorro	LINEAR	·	980 m	MPC · JPL
208169	2000 PH_{27}	—	August 2, 2000	Kitt Peak	Spacewatch	·	1.2 km	MPC · JPL
208170	2000 QG	—	August 21, 2000	Prescott	P. G. Comba	·	4.7 km	MPC · JPL
208171	2000 QF_{13}	—	August 24, 2000	Socorro	LINEAR	·	1.2 km	MPC · JPL
208172	2000 QM_{15}	—	August 24, 2000	Socorro	LINEAR	·	3.0 km	MPC · JPL
208173	2000 QM_{24}	—	August 25, 2000	Socorro	LINEAR	TIR · slow	5.0 km	MPC · JPL
208174	2000 QZ_{26}	—	August 24, 2000	Socorro	LINEAR	TIR ·	4.9 km	MPC · JPL
208175	2000 QA_{29}	—	August 24, 2000	Socorro	LINEAR	ERI	2.1 km	MPC · JPL
208176	2000 QO_{37}	—	August 24, 2000	Socorro	LINEAR	·	1.4 km	MPC · JPL
208177	2000 QR_{70}	—	August 29, 2000	Socorro	LINEAR	PHO	3.9 km	MPC · JPL
208178	2000 QX_{73}	—	August 24, 2000	Socorro	LINEAR	·	1.2 km	MPC · JPL
208179	2000 QP_{79}	—	August 24, 2000	Socorro	LINEAR	·	5.0 km	MPC · JPL
208180	2000 QW_{97}	—	August 28, 2000	Socorro	LINEAR	·	1.4 km	MPC · JPL
208181	2000 QN_{109}	—	August 31, 2000	Kitt Peak	Spacewatch	·	4.1 km	MPC · JPL
208182	2000 QL_{119}	—	August 25, 2000	Socorro	LINEAR	·	2.7 km	MPC · JPL
208183	2000 QD_{129}	—	August 29, 2000	Socorro	LINEAR	·	3.4 km	MPC · JPL
208184	2000 QE_{132}	—	August 26, 2000	Socorro	LINEAR	·	1.5 km	MPC · JPL
208185	2000 QW_{139}	—	August 31, 2000	Socorro	LINEAR	·	7.4 km	MPC · JPL
208186	2000 QN_{165}	—	August 31, 2000	Socorro	LINEAR	EUP	7.4 km	MPC · JPL
208187	2000 QS_{166}	—	August 31, 2000	Socorro	LINEAR	·	1.1 km	MPC · JPL
208188	2000 QO_{167}	—	August 31, 2000	Socorro	LINEAR	·	5.0 km	MPC · JPL
208189	2000 QC_{188}	—	August 26, 2000	Socorro	LINEAR	·	970 m	MPC · JPL
208190	2000 QY_{193}	—	August 29, 2000	Socorro	LINEAR	EOS	2.8 km	MPC · JPL
208191	2000 QM_{202}	—	August 29, 2000	Socorro	LINEAR	·	6.1 km	MPC · JPL
208192	2000 QW_{203}	—	August 29, 2000	Socorro	LINEAR	NYS	1.5 km	MPC · JPL
208193	2000 QB_{206}	—	August 31, 2000	Socorro	LINEAR	NYS	1.7 km	MPC · JPL
208194	2000 QP_{228}	—	August 31, 2000	Socorro	LINEAR	·	1.2 km	MPC · JPL
208195	2000 QT_{228}	—	August 31, 2000	Socorro	LINEAR	·	6.0 km	MPC · JPL
208196 Matthiashahn	2000 QM_{246}	Matthiashahn	August 27, 2000	Cerro Tololo	M. W. Buie	THM	4.6 km	MPC · JPL
208197	2000 RR_{8}	—	September 1, 2000	Socorro	LINEAR	H	550 m	MPC · JPL
208198	2000 RV_{12}	—	September 1, 2000	Socorro	LINEAR	·	4.5 km	MPC · JPL
208199	2000 RF_{37}	—	September 3, 2000	Socorro	LINEAR	PHO	1.4 km	MPC · JPL
208200	2000 RA_{38}	—	September 5, 2000	Kvistaberg	Uppsala-DLR Asteroid Survey	·	2.1 km	MPC · JPL

== 208201–208300 ==
back to top

Designation			Discovery			Properties		Ref
Permanent	Provisional	Named after	Date	Site	Discoverer(s)	Category	Diam.	Ref
208201	2000 RL_{59}	—	September 7, 2000	Kitt Peak	Spacewatch	·	1.2 km	MPC · JPL
208202	2000 RK_{75}	—	September 3, 2000	Socorro	LINEAR	·	1.3 km	MPC · JPL
208203	2000 SX_{8}	—	September 21, 2000	Socorro	LINEAR	PHO	1.1 km	MPC · JPL
208204	2000 SD_{16}	—	September 23, 2000	Socorro	LINEAR	·	6.2 km	MPC · JPL
208205	2000 SE_{24}	—	September 24, 2000	Socorro	LINEAR	PHO	1.5 km	MPC · JPL
208206	2000 ST_{24}	—	September 26, 2000	Bisei SG Center	BATTeRS	·	1.6 km	MPC · JPL
208207	2000 SU_{43}	—	September 22, 2000	Socorro	LINEAR	PAL	4.1 km	MPC · JPL
208208	2000 SJ_{53}	—	September 24, 2000	Socorro	LINEAR	·	4.4 km	MPC · JPL
208209	2000 SQ_{60}	—	September 24, 2000	Socorro	LINEAR	·	5.4 km	MPC · JPL
208210	2000 SK_{65}	—	September 24, 2000	Socorro	LINEAR	THM	3.5 km	MPC · JPL
208211	2000 SV_{82}	—	September 24, 2000	Socorro	LINEAR	·	1.3 km	MPC · JPL
208212	2000 SG_{83}	—	September 24, 2000	Socorro	LINEAR	MAS	820 m	MPC · JPL
208213	2000 SW_{83}	—	September 24, 2000	Socorro	LINEAR	NYS	1.3 km	MPC · JPL
208214	2000 SQ_{88}	—	September 24, 2000	Socorro	LINEAR	·	1.9 km	MPC · JPL
208215	2000 SL_{101}	—	September 24, 2000	Socorro	LINEAR	·	1.5 km	MPC · JPL
208216	2000 SK_{103}	—	September 24, 2000	Socorro	LINEAR	·	8.2 km	MPC · JPL
208217	2000 SW_{104}	—	September 24, 2000	Socorro	LINEAR	·	1.4 km	MPC · JPL
208218	2000 SP_{109}	—	September 24, 2000	Socorro	LINEAR	V	990 m	MPC · JPL
208219	2000 SA_{114}	—	September 24, 2000	Socorro	LINEAR	·	1.3 km	MPC · JPL
208220	2000 SL_{120}	—	September 24, 2000	Socorro	LINEAR	MAS	1.1 km	MPC · JPL
208221	2000 SL_{127}	—	September 24, 2000	Socorro	LINEAR	·	2.2 km	MPC · JPL
208222	2000 SL_{147}	—	September 24, 2000	Socorro	LINEAR	·	1.6 km	MPC · JPL
208223	2000 SE_{160}	—	September 23, 2000	Socorro	LINEAR	PHO	1.5 km	MPC · JPL
208224	2000 SR_{206}	—	September 24, 2000	Socorro	LINEAR	·	1.3 km	MPC · JPL
208225	2000 SL_{207}	—	September 24, 2000	Socorro	LINEAR	·	1.6 km	MPC · JPL
208226	2000 SO_{226}	—	September 27, 2000	Socorro	LINEAR	·	1.6 km	MPC · JPL
208227	2000 SM_{239}	—	September 27, 2000	Socorro	LINEAR	·	1 km	MPC · JPL
208228	2000 SC_{247}	—	September 24, 2000	Socorro	LINEAR	·	1.3 km	MPC · JPL
208229	2000 SZ_{249}	—	September 24, 2000	Socorro	LINEAR	·	4.2 km	MPC · JPL
208230	2000 SO_{254}	—	September 24, 2000	Socorro	LINEAR	NYS	1.2 km	MPC · JPL
208231	2000 SR_{260}	—	September 24, 2000	Socorro	LINEAR	·	1.1 km	MPC · JPL
208232	2000 SG_{262}	—	September 25, 2000	Socorro	LINEAR	·	4.2 km	MPC · JPL
208233	2000 SD_{265}	—	September 26, 2000	Socorro	LINEAR	NYS	1.6 km	MPC · JPL
208234	2000 SL_{273}	—	September 28, 2000	Socorro	LINEAR	NYS	1.4 km	MPC · JPL
208235	2000 SV_{281}	—	September 23, 2000	Socorro	LINEAR	·	1.3 km	MPC · JPL
208236	2000 SM_{299}	—	September 28, 2000	Socorro	LINEAR	·	1.3 km	MPC · JPL
208237	2000 SH_{320}	—	September 29, 2000	Kitt Peak	Spacewatch	·	4.2 km	MPC · JPL
208238	2000 SS_{325}	—	September 29, 2000	Kitt Peak	Spacewatch	·	770 m	MPC · JPL
208239	2000 SN_{344}	—	September 29, 2000	Xinglong	SCAP	NYS	1.3 km	MPC · JPL
208240	2000 SK_{359}	—	September 26, 2000	Anderson Mesa	LONEOS	·	890 m	MPC · JPL
208241	2000 TO_{20}	—	October 1, 2000	Socorro	LINEAR	·	1.7 km	MPC · JPL
208242	2000 TJ_{40}	—	October 1, 2000	Socorro	LINEAR	·	1.4 km	MPC · JPL
208243	2000 TK_{45}	—	October 1, 2000	Socorro	LINEAR	V	1.0 km	MPC · JPL
208244	2000 TN_{45}	—	October 1, 2000	Socorro	LINEAR	·	1.4 km	MPC · JPL
208245	2000 TP_{52}	—	October 1, 2000	Socorro	LINEAR	·	1.1 km	MPC · JPL
208246	2000 UB_{19}	—	October 29, 2000	Socorro	LINEAR	·	2.7 km	MPC · JPL
208247	2000 US_{32}	—	October 29, 2000	Kitt Peak	Spacewatch	MAS	1.0 km	MPC · JPL
208248	2000 UF_{34}	—	October 24, 2000	Socorro	LINEAR	V	1.1 km	MPC · JPL
208249	2000 UG_{42}	—	October 24, 2000	Socorro	LINEAR	·	1.7 km	MPC · JPL
208250	2000 UD_{114}	—	October 25, 2000	Socorro	LINEAR	·	1.8 km	MPC · JPL
208251	2000 VQ_{3}	—	November 1, 2000	Socorro	LINEAR	·	1.8 km	MPC · JPL
208252	2000 VM_{7}	—	November 1, 2000	Socorro	LINEAR	MAS	900 m	MPC · JPL
208253	2000 VQ_{12}	—	November 1, 2000	Socorro	LINEAR	·	1.7 km	MPC · JPL
208254	2000 VC_{19}	—	November 1, 2000	Socorro	LINEAR	·	1.6 km	MPC · JPL
208255	2000 VE_{53}	—	November 3, 2000	Socorro	LINEAR	ERI	3.4 km	MPC · JPL
208256	2000 VC_{57}	—	November 3, 2000	Socorro	LINEAR	·	2.3 km	MPC · JPL
208257	2000 VW_{57}	—	November 3, 2000	Socorro	LINEAR	PHO	1.7 km	MPC · JPL
208258	2000 VQ_{61}	—	November 3, 2000	Socorro	LINEAR	·	1.4 km	MPC · JPL
208259	2000 WX_{5}	—	November 19, 2000	Socorro	LINEAR	V	1.2 km	MPC · JPL
208260	2000 WT_{16}	—	November 21, 2000	Socorro	LINEAR	NYS	1.5 km	MPC · JPL
208261	2000 WW_{22}	—	November 20, 2000	Socorro	LINEAR	·	1.6 km	MPC · JPL
208262	2000 WN_{64}	—	November 25, 2000	Kitt Peak	Spacewatch	·	1.7 km	MPC · JPL
208263	2000 WZ_{66}	—	November 21, 2000	Socorro	LINEAR	·	2.9 km	MPC · JPL
208264	2000 WM_{85}	—	November 20, 2000	Socorro	LINEAR	·	1.9 km	MPC · JPL
208265	2000 WJ_{113}	—	November 20, 2000	Socorro	LINEAR	·	2.0 km	MPC · JPL
208266	2000 WQ_{113}	—	November 20, 2000	Socorro	LINEAR	·	1.8 km	MPC · JPL
208267	2000 WQ_{166}	—	November 24, 2000	Anderson Mesa	LONEOS	·	1.7 km	MPC · JPL
208268	2000 WC_{170}	—	November 23, 2000	Eskridge	G. Hug	·	1.9 km	MPC · JPL
208269	2000 XM	—	December 1, 2000	Kitt Peak	Spacewatch	NYS	1.2 km	MPC · JPL
208270	2000 XQ	—	December 1, 2000	Kitt Peak	Spacewatch	·	1.9 km	MPC · JPL
208271	2000 YQ_{20}	—	December 28, 2000	Kitt Peak	Spacewatch	MAS	980 m	MPC · JPL
208272	2000 YX_{25}	—	December 22, 2000	Socorro	LINEAR	·	2.1 km	MPC · JPL
208273	2000 YE_{52}	—	December 30, 2000	Socorro	LINEAR	ADE	2.3 km	MPC · JPL
208274	2000 YR_{56}	—	December 30, 2000	Socorro	LINEAR	·	1.6 km	MPC · JPL
208275	2000 YA_{94}	—	December 30, 2000	Socorro	LINEAR	MAS	1.0 km	MPC · JPL
208276	2000 YQ_{106}	—	December 30, 2000	Socorro	LINEAR	·	1.9 km	MPC · JPL
208277	2000 YB_{110}	—	December 30, 2000	Socorro	LINEAR	NYS	1.8 km	MPC · JPL
208278	2001 AH_{49}	—	January 15, 2001	Socorro	LINEAR	·	1.7 km	MPC · JPL
208279	2001 BG_{1}	—	January 17, 2001	Socorro	LINEAR	H	1.0 km	MPC · JPL
208280	2001 BB_{2}	—	January 16, 2001	Kitt Peak	Spacewatch	·	1.5 km	MPC · JPL
208281	2001 BL_{5}	—	January 19, 2001	Socorro	LINEAR	H	900 m	MPC · JPL
208282	2001 BM_{7}	—	January 19, 2001	Socorro	LINEAR	·	2.3 km	MPC · JPL
208283	2001 BS_{13}	—	January 21, 2001	Socorro	LINEAR	BAR	2.4 km	MPC · JPL
208284	2001 BS_{35}	—	January 17, 2001	Haleakala	NEAT	H	1.0 km	MPC · JPL
208285	2001 BX_{61}	—	January 31, 2001	Socorro	LINEAR	H	830 m	MPC · JPL
208286	2001 CZ_{11}	—	February 1, 2001	Socorro	LINEAR	·	2.6 km	MPC · JPL
208287	2001 CN_{12}	—	February 1, 2001	Socorro	LINEAR	ADE	4.1 km	MPC · JPL
208288	2001 CC_{38}	—	February 15, 2001	Socorro	LINEAR	·	3.9 km	MPC · JPL
208289	2001 CC_{40}	—	February 13, 2001	Socorro	LINEAR	·	3.9 km	MPC · JPL
208290	2001 DH_{1}	—	February 16, 2001	Kitt Peak	Spacewatch	3:2	5.5 km	MPC · JPL
208291	2001 DL_{14}	—	February 19, 2001	Socorro	LINEAR	H	760 m	MPC · JPL
208292	2001 DO_{25}	—	February 17, 2001	Socorro	LINEAR	·	1.7 km	MPC · JPL
208293	2001 DT_{52}	—	February 17, 2001	Socorro	LINEAR	(5)	2.5 km	MPC · JPL
208294	2001 DO_{78}	—	February 22, 2001	Kitt Peak	Spacewatch	·	1.9 km	MPC · JPL
208295	2001 FK_{4}	—	March 19, 2001	Kitt Peak	Spacewatch	·	2.9 km	MPC · JPL
208296	2001 FQ_{13}	—	March 19, 2001	Anderson Mesa	LONEOS	·	3.3 km	MPC · JPL
208297	2001 FX_{23}	—	March 19, 2001	Socorro	LINEAR	H	750 m	MPC · JPL
208298	2001 FL_{40}	—	March 18, 2001	Socorro	LINEAR	(5)	1.7 km	MPC · JPL
208299	2001 FQ_{66}	—	March 19, 2001	Socorro	LINEAR	·	2.6 km	MPC · JPL
208300	2001 FA_{78}	—	March 19, 2001	Socorro	LINEAR	·	2.1 km	MPC · JPL

== 208301–208400 ==
back to top

Designation			Discovery			Properties		Ref
Permanent	Provisional	Named after	Date	Site	Discoverer(s)	Category	Diam.	Ref
208301	2001 FY_{100}	—	March 17, 2001	Prescott	P. G. Comba	·	1.8 km	MPC · JPL
208302	2001 FJ_{109}	—	March 18, 2001	Socorro	LINEAR	·	1.9 km	MPC · JPL
208303	2001 FT_{118}	—	March 20, 2001	Kitt Peak	Spacewatch	ADE	2.7 km	MPC · JPL
208304	2001 FL_{133}	—	March 20, 2001	Haleakala	NEAT	RAF	2.0 km	MPC · JPL
208305	2001 FK_{145}	—	March 24, 2001	Anderson Mesa	LONEOS	·	3.3 km	MPC · JPL
208306	2001 FB_{158}	—	March 27, 2001	Anderson Mesa	LONEOS	H	1.0 km	MPC · JPL
208307	2001 FE_{191}	—	March 19, 2001	Socorro	LINEAR	·	1.9 km	MPC · JPL
208308	2001 HA_{3}	—	April 17, 2001	Socorro	LINEAR	·	1.7 km	MPC · JPL
208309	2001 HO_{6}	—	April 18, 2001	Kitt Peak	Spacewatch	·	1.8 km	MPC · JPL
208310	2001 HA_{41}	—	April 27, 2001	Socorro	LINEAR	EUN	2.2 km	MPC · JPL
208311	2001 HO_{42}	—	April 16, 2001	Socorro	LINEAR	·	2.0 km	MPC · JPL
208312	2001 JA_{10}	—	May 15, 2001	Haleakala	NEAT	·	1.5 km	MPC · JPL
208313	2001 KX_{1}	—	May 19, 2001	Haleakala	NEAT	·	2.1 km	MPC · JPL
208314	2001 KR_{9}	—	May 18, 2001	Socorro	LINEAR	·	2.1 km	MPC · JPL
208315	2001 KR_{22}	—	May 17, 2001	Socorro	LINEAR	·	4.5 km	MPC · JPL
208316	2001 ME	—	June 16, 2001	Desert Beaver	W. K. Y. Yeung	·	3.6 km	MPC · JPL
208317	2001 MF_{3}	—	June 20, 2001	Palomar	NEAT	·	2.0 km	MPC · JPL
208318	2001 MC_{18}	—	June 20, 2001	Haleakala	NEAT	·	2.2 km	MPC · JPL
208319	2001 MF_{28}	—	June 24, 2001	Kitt Peak	Spacewatch	·	2.3 km	MPC · JPL
208320	2001 NY_{6}	—	July 14, 2001	Palomar	NEAT	·	2.9 km	MPC · JPL
208321	2001 NR_{13}	—	July 13, 2001	Palomar	NEAT	·	3.0 km	MPC · JPL
208322	2001 OS_{20}	—	July 21, 2001	Anderson Mesa	LONEOS	·	6.1 km	MPC · JPL
208323	2001 OX_{110}	—	July 16, 2001	Haleakala	NEAT	·	2.7 km	MPC · JPL
208324	2001 PR_{10}	—	August 8, 2001	Haleakala	NEAT	·	4.8 km	MPC · JPL
208325	2001 PZ_{37}	—	August 11, 2001	Palomar	NEAT	·	4.4 km	MPC · JPL
208326	2001 PF_{53}	—	August 14, 2001	Haleakala	NEAT	·	3.1 km	MPC · JPL
208327	2001 PB_{60}	—	August 13, 2001	Palomar	NEAT	·	2.5 km	MPC · JPL
208328	2001 QH_{21}	—	August 16, 2001	Socorro	LINEAR	·	1.4 km	MPC · JPL
208329	2001 QT_{42}	—	August 16, 2001	Socorro	LINEAR	·	3.9 km	MPC · JPL
208330	2001 QN_{47}	—	August 16, 2001	Socorro	LINEAR	·	4.8 km	MPC · JPL
208331	2001 QN_{111}	—	August 18, 2001	Socorro	LINEAR	EUP	9.8 km	MPC · JPL
208332	2001 QE_{135}	—	August 22, 2001	Socorro	LINEAR	·	4.6 km	MPC · JPL
208333	2001 QM_{138}	—	August 22, 2001	Socorro	LINEAR	·	7.5 km	MPC · JPL
208334	2001 QM_{143}	—	August 21, 2001	Kitt Peak	Spacewatch	KOR	2.4 km	MPC · JPL
208335	2001 QV_{154}	—	August 23, 2001	Anderson Mesa	LONEOS	·	6.1 km	MPC · JPL
208336	2001 QE_{209}	—	August 23, 2001	Anderson Mesa	LONEOS	KOR	2.2 km	MPC · JPL
208337	2001 QL_{209}	—	August 23, 2001	Anderson Mesa	LONEOS	·	3.1 km	MPC · JPL
208338	2001 QJ_{210}	—	August 23, 2001	Kitt Peak	Spacewatch	·	5.9 km	MPC · JPL
208339	2001 QB_{226}	—	August 24, 2001	Anderson Mesa	LONEOS	EOS	3.1 km	MPC · JPL
208340	2001 QN_{229}	—	August 24, 2001	Anderson Mesa	LONEOS	·	3.2 km	MPC · JPL
208341	2001 QB_{235}	—	August 24, 2001	Socorro	LINEAR	·	3.0 km	MPC · JPL
208342	2001 QC_{235}	—	August 24, 2001	Socorro	LINEAR	·	3.2 km	MPC · JPL
208343	2001 QZ_{239}	—	August 24, 2001	Socorro	LINEAR	EOS	2.4 km	MPC · JPL
208344	2001 QZ_{253}	—	August 25, 2001	Anderson Mesa	LONEOS	·	3.9 km	MPC · JPL
208345	2001 QG_{328}	—	August 26, 2001	Palomar	NEAT	EOS	2.3 km	MPC · JPL
208346	2001 QJ_{330}	—	August 25, 2001	Socorro	LINEAR	·	3.3 km	MPC · JPL
208347	2001 QP_{333}	—	August 25, 2001	Socorro	LINEAR	·	7.4 km	MPC · JPL
208348	2001 RT_{2}	—	September 9, 2001	Desert Eagle	W. K. Y. Yeung	EUP	9.3 km	MPC · JPL
208349	2001 RX_{10}	—	September 11, 2001	Badlands	Badlands	·	2.9 km	MPC · JPL
208350	2001 RC_{14}	—	September 10, 2001	Socorro	LINEAR	KOR	1.9 km	MPC · JPL
208351 Sielmann	2001 RO_{15}	Sielmann	September 8, 2001	Drebach	~Knöfel, A.	EUP	8.5 km	MPC · JPL
208352	2001 RC_{24}	—	September 7, 2001	Socorro	LINEAR	·	2.5 km	MPC · JPL
208353	2001 RY_{36}	—	September 8, 2001	Socorro	LINEAR	·	2.1 km	MPC · JPL
208354	2001 RO_{37}	—	September 8, 2001	Socorro	LINEAR	·	5.2 km	MPC · JPL
208355	2001 RK_{54}	—	September 12, 2001	Socorro	LINEAR	KOR	2.3 km	MPC · JPL
208356	2001 RP_{55}	—	September 12, 2001	Socorro	LINEAR	·	4.6 km	MPC · JPL
208357	2001 RY_{55}	—	September 12, 2001	Socorro	LINEAR	·	4.5 km	MPC · JPL
208358	2001 RQ_{56}	—	September 12, 2001	Socorro	LINEAR	·	2.5 km	MPC · JPL
208359	2001 RE_{57}	—	September 12, 2001	Socorro	LINEAR	·	4.2 km	MPC · JPL
208360	2001 RB_{64}	—	September 10, 2001	Socorro	LINEAR	·	2.6 km	MPC · JPL
208361	2001 RP_{84}	—	September 11, 2001	Anderson Mesa	LONEOS	·	3.5 km	MPC · JPL
208362	2001 RO_{95}	—	September 12, 2001	Socorro	LINEAR	TIR ·	5.7 km	MPC · JPL
208363	2001 RT_{122}	—	September 12, 2001	Socorro	LINEAR	KOR	2.1 km	MPC · JPL
208364	2001 RL_{123}	—	September 12, 2001	Socorro	LINEAR	LIX	5.7 km	MPC · JPL
208365	2001 RX_{138}	—	September 12, 2001	Socorro	LINEAR	KOR	2.4 km	MPC · JPL
208366	2001 RX_{144}	—	September 6, 2001	Palomar	NEAT	·	4.2 km	MPC · JPL
208367	2001 RC_{152}	—	September 11, 2001	Anderson Mesa	LONEOS	EOS	3.3 km	MPC · JPL
208368	2001 RD_{153}	—	September 12, 2001	Socorro	LINEAR	·	2.7 km	MPC · JPL
208369	2001 SL_{6}	—	September 18, 2001	Kitt Peak	Spacewatch	·	2.3 km	MPC · JPL
208370	2001 SA_{24}	—	September 16, 2001	Socorro	LINEAR	·	4.8 km	MPC · JPL
208371	2001 SA_{30}	—	September 16, 2001	Socorro	LINEAR	·	2.6 km	MPC · JPL
208372	2001 SB_{33}	—	September 16, 2001	Socorro	LINEAR	·	3.4 km	MPC · JPL
208373	2001 SR_{33}	—	September 16, 2001	Socorro	LINEAR	·	6.0 km	MPC · JPL
208374	2001 SS_{42}	—	September 16, 2001	Socorro	LINEAR	URS	5.3 km	MPC · JPL
208375	2001 SX_{53}	—	September 16, 2001	Socorro	LINEAR	·	4.8 km	MPC · JPL
208376	2001 SE_{59}	—	September 17, 2001	Socorro	LINEAR	EOS	3.3 km	MPC · JPL
208377	2001 SO_{75}	—	September 19, 2001	Anderson Mesa	LONEOS	·	2.5 km	MPC · JPL
208378	2001 SU_{77}	—	September 19, 2001	Socorro	LINEAR	·	3.5 km	MPC · JPL
208379	2001 SR_{78}	—	September 19, 2001	Socorro	LINEAR	KOR	2.3 km	MPC · JPL
208380	2001 SM_{89}	—	September 20, 2001	Socorro	LINEAR	EOS	2.7 km	MPC · JPL
208381	2001 SX_{90}	—	September 20, 2001	Socorro	LINEAR	·	4.1 km	MPC · JPL
208382	2001 SJ_{93}	—	September 20, 2001	Socorro	LINEAR	·	2.6 km	MPC · JPL
208383	2001 ST_{95}	—	September 20, 2001	Socorro	LINEAR	·	2.5 km	MPC · JPL
208384	2001 SO_{100}	—	September 20, 2001	Socorro	LINEAR	·	2.6 km	MPC · JPL
208385	2001 SB_{130}	—	September 16, 2001	Socorro	LINEAR	·	6.4 km	MPC · JPL
208386	2001 SQ_{131}	—	September 16, 2001	Socorro	LINEAR	EOS	2.8 km	MPC · JPL
208387	2001 SJ_{132}	—	September 16, 2001	Socorro	LINEAR	·	4.3 km	MPC · JPL
208388	2001 SP_{139}	—	September 16, 2001	Socorro	LINEAR	·	2.3 km	MPC · JPL
208389	2001 SZ_{139}	—	September 16, 2001	Socorro	LINEAR	·	2.5 km	MPC · JPL
208390	2001 SW_{156}	—	September 17, 2001	Socorro	LINEAR	·	4.7 km	MPC · JPL
208391	2001 SG_{165}	—	September 19, 2001	Socorro	LINEAR	·	3.3 km	MPC · JPL
208392	2001 SX_{168}	—	September 19, 2001	Socorro	LINEAR	·	3.4 km	MPC · JPL
208393	2001 SJ_{172}	—	September 16, 2001	Socorro	LINEAR	·	2.5 km	MPC · JPL
208394	2001 SD_{174}	—	September 16, 2001	Socorro	LINEAR	·	3.9 km	MPC · JPL
208395	2001 SY_{175}	—	September 16, 2001	Socorro	LINEAR	EOS	2.5 km	MPC · JPL
208396	2001 SZ_{182}	—	September 19, 2001	Socorro	LINEAR	·	2.7 km	MPC · JPL
208397	2001 SV_{197}	—	September 19, 2001	Socorro	LINEAR	KOR	2.0 km	MPC · JPL
208398	2001 SD_{200}	—	September 19, 2001	Socorro	LINEAR	THM	3.3 km	MPC · JPL
208399	2001 SW_{201}	—	September 19, 2001	Socorro	LINEAR	(5651)	5.3 km	MPC · JPL
208400	2001 SF_{203}	—	September 19, 2001	Socorro	LINEAR	KOR	2.3 km	MPC · JPL

== 208401–208500 ==
back to top

Designation			Discovery			Properties		Ref
Permanent	Provisional	Named after	Date	Site	Discoverer(s)	Category	Diam.	Ref
208401	2001 SV_{210}	—	September 19, 2001	Socorro	LINEAR	·	3.7 km	MPC · JPL
208402	2001 SY_{210}	—	September 19, 2001	Socorro	LINEAR	TEL	2.1 km	MPC · JPL
208403	2001 SM_{217}	—	September 19, 2001	Socorro	LINEAR	·	3.6 km	MPC · JPL
208404	2001 SY_{220}	—	September 19, 2001	Socorro	LINEAR	·	2.1 km	MPC · JPL
208405	2001 SP_{227}	—	September 19, 2001	Socorro	LINEAR	·	2.6 km	MPC · JPL
208406	2001 SD_{228}	—	September 19, 2001	Socorro	LINEAR	·	2.5 km	MPC · JPL
208407	2001 SF_{231}	—	September 19, 2001	Socorro	LINEAR	KOR	2.5 km	MPC · JPL
208408	2001 SD_{234}	—	September 19, 2001	Socorro	LINEAR	·	3.6 km	MPC · JPL
208409	2001 SG_{241}	—	September 19, 2001	Socorro	LINEAR	EOS	2.8 km	MPC · JPL
208410	2001 SF_{242}	—	September 19, 2001	Socorro	LINEAR	·	4.3 km	MPC · JPL
208411	2001 SY_{243}	—	September 19, 2001	Socorro	LINEAR	·	2.1 km	MPC · JPL
208412	2001 SF_{251}	—	September 19, 2001	Socorro	LINEAR	·	4.3 km	MPC · JPL
208413	2001 SV_{268}	—	September 19, 2001	Kitt Peak	Spacewatch	GEF	1.6 km	MPC · JPL
208414	2001 SO_{274}	—	September 20, 2001	Kitt Peak	Spacewatch	THM	2.8 km	MPC · JPL
208415	2001 ST_{274}	—	September 20, 2001	Kitt Peak	Spacewatch	·	2.8 km	MPC · JPL
208416	2001 SN_{283}	—	September 20, 2001	Kitt Peak	Spacewatch	EOS	2.2 km	MPC · JPL
208417	2001 SH_{293}	—	September 19, 2001	Socorro	LINEAR	·	3.3 km	MPC · JPL
208418	2001 SJ_{302}	—	September 20, 2001	Socorro	LINEAR	·	830 m	MPC · JPL
208419	2001 SX_{311}	—	September 20, 2001	Socorro	LINEAR	·	4.4 km	MPC · JPL
208420	2001 SQ_{324}	—	September 16, 2001	Socorro	LINEAR	EOS	2.9 km	MPC · JPL
208421	2001 SU_{333}	—	September 19, 2001	Kitt Peak	Spacewatch	·	3.5 km	MPC · JPL
208422	2001 SE_{340}	—	September 21, 2001	Anderson Mesa	LONEOS	·	4.6 km	MPC · JPL
208423	2001 SU_{342}	—	September 21, 2001	Palomar	NEAT	·	3.8 km	MPC · JPL
208424	2001 SF_{345}	—	September 23, 2001	Palomar	NEAT	T_{j} (2.99) · EUP	7.0 km	MPC · JPL
208425 Zehavi	2001 SF_{353}	Zehavi	September 18, 2001	Apache Point	SDSS	EOS	5.1 km	MPC · JPL
208426	2001 SE_{355}	—	September 25, 2001	Palomar	NEAT	·	4.4 km	MPC · JPL
208427	2001 TU_{5}	—	October 10, 2001	Palomar	NEAT	EMA	6.2 km	MPC · JPL
208428	2001 TO_{16}	—	October 11, 2001	Socorro	LINEAR	·	5.4 km	MPC · JPL
208429	2001 TM_{47}	—	October 14, 2001	Cima Ekar	ADAS	·	3.1 km	MPC · JPL
208430	2001 TQ_{51}	—	October 13, 2001	Socorro	LINEAR	·	840 m	MPC · JPL
208431	2001 TZ_{69}	—	October 13, 2001	Socorro	LINEAR	·	3.0 km	MPC · JPL
208432	2001 TF_{84}	—	October 14, 2001	Socorro	LINEAR	·	3.3 km	MPC · JPL
208433	2001 TX_{84}	—	October 14, 2001	Socorro	LINEAR	·	4.6 km	MPC · JPL
208434	2001 TM_{85}	—	October 14, 2001	Socorro	LINEAR	EMA	5.7 km	MPC · JPL
208435	2001 TV_{90}	—	October 14, 2001	Socorro	LINEAR	·	4.1 km	MPC · JPL
208436	2001 TP_{102}	—	October 15, 2001	Socorro	LINEAR	ANF	2.2 km	MPC · JPL
208437	2001 TQ_{108}	—	October 14, 2001	Socorro	LINEAR	·	3.0 km	MPC · JPL
208438	2001 TT_{109}	—	October 14, 2001	Socorro	LINEAR	EOS	3.2 km	MPC · JPL
208439	2001 TY_{111}	—	October 14, 2001	Socorro	LINEAR	EOS	4.2 km	MPC · JPL
208440	2001 TR_{119}	—	October 15, 2001	Socorro	LINEAR	·	3.7 km	MPC · JPL
208441	2001 TR_{125}	—	October 12, 2001	Haleakala	NEAT	EOS	2.4 km	MPC · JPL
208442	2001 TQ_{129}	—	October 15, 2001	Kitt Peak	Spacewatch	THM	3.2 km	MPC · JPL
208443	2001 TZ_{131}	—	October 11, 2001	Palomar	NEAT	HYG	3.0 km	MPC · JPL
208444	2001 TT_{135}	—	October 13, 2001	Palomar	NEAT	EOS	3.0 km	MPC · JPL
208445	2001 TB_{137}	—	October 14, 2001	Palomar	NEAT	·	6.6 km	MPC · JPL
208446	2001 TZ_{145}	—	October 10, 2001	Palomar	NEAT	·	3.0 km	MPC · JPL
208447	2001 TT_{147}	—	October 10, 2001	Palomar	NEAT	·	3.5 km	MPC · JPL
208448	2001 TC_{157}	—	October 14, 2001	Kitt Peak	Spacewatch	·	3.9 km	MPC · JPL
208449	2001 TK_{163}	—	October 11, 2001	Palomar	NEAT	·	4.8 km	MPC · JPL
208450	2001 TY_{163}	—	October 11, 2001	Palomar	NEAT	·	3.2 km	MPC · JPL
208451	2001 TT_{170}	—	October 13, 2001	Palomar	NEAT	·	4.9 km	MPC · JPL
208452	2001 TA_{171}	—	October 15, 2001	Haleakala	NEAT	·	4.7 km	MPC · JPL
208453	2001 TO_{172}	—	October 13, 2001	Socorro	LINEAR	VER	6.9 km	MPC · JPL
208454	2001 TT_{177}	—	October 14, 2001	Socorro	LINEAR	·	3.7 km	MPC · JPL
208455	2001 TN_{181}	—	October 14, 2001	Socorro	LINEAR	·	4.3 km	MPC · JPL
208456	2001 TY_{185}	—	October 14, 2001	Socorro	LINEAR	·	3.6 km	MPC · JPL
208457	2001 TR_{200}	—	October 11, 2001	Socorro	LINEAR	·	5.9 km	MPC · JPL
208458	2001 TW_{205}	—	October 11, 2001	Goodricke-Pigott	R. A. Tucker	·	5.0 km	MPC · JPL
208459	2001 TG_{211}	—	October 13, 2001	Palomar	NEAT	·	3.3 km	MPC · JPL
208460	2001 TT_{213}	—	October 13, 2001	Palomar	NEAT	EOS	3.0 km	MPC · JPL
208461	2001 TY_{258}	—	October 12, 2001	Palomar	NEAT	·	3.5 km	MPC · JPL
208462	2001 UR_{7}	—	October 17, 2001	Socorro	LINEAR	·	4.6 km	MPC · JPL
208463	2001 UH_{32}	—	October 16, 2001	Socorro	LINEAR	EUP	5.5 km	MPC · JPL
208464	2001 UO_{44}	—	October 17, 2001	Socorro	LINEAR	·	3.3 km	MPC · JPL
208465	2001 UZ_{70}	—	October 17, 2001	Kitt Peak	Spacewatch	THM	2.7 km	MPC · JPL
208466	2001 UW_{71}	—	October 20, 2001	Kitt Peak	Spacewatch	·	2.6 km	MPC · JPL
208467	2001 UV_{77}	—	October 18, 2001	Socorro	LINEAR	THM	2.8 km	MPC · JPL
208468	2001 UL_{85}	—	October 16, 2001	Kitt Peak	Spacewatch	·	2.9 km	MPC · JPL
208469	2001 UE_{92}	—	October 18, 2001	Palomar	NEAT	·	970 m	MPC · JPL
208470	2001 UG_{96}	—	October 17, 2001	Socorro	LINEAR	THM	3.3 km	MPC · JPL
208471	2001 UP_{106}	—	October 20, 2001	Socorro	LINEAR	·	2.7 km	MPC · JPL
208472	2001 UY_{108}	—	October 20, 2001	Socorro	LINEAR	·	1.3 km	MPC · JPL
208473	2001 UL_{113}	—	October 22, 2001	Socorro	LINEAR	·	5.6 km	MPC · JPL
208474	2001 UP_{122}	—	October 22, 2001	Socorro	LINEAR	·	3.4 km	MPC · JPL
208475	2001 UX_{126}	—	October 17, 2001	Socorro	LINEAR	HYG	4.0 km	MPC · JPL
208476	2001 UB_{127}	—	October 17, 2001	Socorro	LINEAR	·	5.6 km	MPC · JPL
208477	2001 UW_{130}	—	October 20, 2001	Socorro	LINEAR	·	3.6 km	MPC · JPL
208478	2001 UO_{132}	—	October 20, 2001	Socorro	LINEAR	·	1.3 km	MPC · JPL
208479	2001 UC_{137}	—	October 23, 2001	Socorro	LINEAR	·	3.7 km	MPC · JPL
208480	2001 UP_{138}	—	October 23, 2001	Socorro	LINEAR	·	3.2 km	MPC · JPL
208481	2001 US_{157}	—	October 23, 2001	Socorro	LINEAR	·	5.2 km	MPC · JPL
208482	2001 UZ_{162}	—	October 23, 2001	Socorro	LINEAR	·	5.8 km	MPC · JPL
208483	2001 UH_{190}	—	October 18, 2001	Palomar	NEAT	HYG	3.0 km	MPC · JPL
208484	2001 UD_{196}	—	October 18, 2001	Palomar	NEAT	·	4.4 km	MPC · JPL
208485	2001 UG_{211}	—	October 21, 2001	Socorro	LINEAR	·	4.1 km	MPC · JPL
208486	2001 VX_{50}	—	November 10, 2001	Socorro	LINEAR	·	4.3 km	MPC · JPL
208487	2001 VC_{58}	—	November 10, 2001	Socorro	LINEAR	·	5.0 km	MPC · JPL
208488	2001 VT_{63}	—	November 10, 2001	Socorro	LINEAR	·	1.1 km	MPC · JPL
208489	2001 VH_{64}	—	November 10, 2001	Socorro	LINEAR	·	1.2 km	MPC · JPL
208490	2001 VA_{73}	—	November 12, 2001	Kitt Peak	Spacewatch	·	4.4 km	MPC · JPL
208491	2001 VH_{73}	—	November 12, 2001	Kitt Peak	Spacewatch	THM	2.9 km	MPC · JPL
208492	2001 VA_{78}	—	November 11, 2001	Kitt Peak	Spacewatch	·	1.1 km	MPC · JPL
208493	2001 VH_{81}	—	November 12, 2001	Haleakala	NEAT	·	5.1 km	MPC · JPL
208494	2001 VE_{91}	—	November 15, 2001	Socorro	LINEAR	·	5.9 km	MPC · JPL
208495	2001 VP_{91}	—	November 15, 2001	Socorro	LINEAR	·	6.5 km	MPC · JPL
208496	2001 VW_{96}	—	November 15, 2001	Socorro	LINEAR	·	4.9 km	MPC · JPL
208497	2001 VH_{105}	—	November 12, 2001	Socorro	LINEAR	·	750 m	MPC · JPL
208498	2001 VU_{111}	—	November 12, 2001	Socorro	LINEAR	·	910 m	MPC · JPL
208499 Shokasonjuku	2001 WN_{2}	Shokasonjuku	November 17, 2001	Kuma Kogen	A. Nakamura	·	5.2 km	MPC · JPL
208500	2001 WW_{8}	—	November 17, 2001	Socorro	LINEAR	·	2.9 km	MPC · JPL

== 208501–208600 ==
back to top

Designation			Discovery			Properties		Ref
Permanent	Provisional	Named after	Date	Site	Discoverer(s)	Category	Diam.	Ref
208501	2001 WK_{17}	—	November 17, 2001	Socorro	LINEAR	·	3.4 km	MPC · JPL
208502	2001 WX_{36}	—	November 17, 2001	Socorro	LINEAR	·	6.5 km	MPC · JPL
208503	2001 WX_{78}	—	November 20, 2001	Socorro	LINEAR	·	1.1 km	MPC · JPL
208504	2001 WM_{86}	—	November 20, 2001	Socorro	LINEAR	·	1.1 km	MPC · JPL
208505	2001 WA_{91}	—	November 21, 2001	Socorro	LINEAR	·	4.3 km	MPC · JPL
208506	2001 WB_{93}	—	November 21, 2001	Socorro	LINEAR	·	1.1 km	MPC · JPL
208507	2001 XO	—	December 6, 2001	Socorro	LINEAR	PHO	3.1 km	MPC · JPL
208508	2001 XA_{12}	—	December 9, 2001	Socorro	LINEAR	·	4.7 km	MPC · JPL
208509	2001 XG_{60}	—	December 10, 2001	Socorro	LINEAR	·	1 km	MPC · JPL
208510	2001 XR_{61}	—	December 10, 2001	Socorro	LINEAR	·	1.1 km	MPC · JPL
208511	2001 XQ_{90}	—	December 10, 2001	Socorro	LINEAR	HYG	3.8 km	MPC · JPL
208512	2001 XZ_{106}	—	December 10, 2001	Socorro	LINEAR	·	1.3 km	MPC · JPL
208513	2001 XH_{107}	—	December 10, 2001	Socorro	LINEAR	·	900 m	MPC · JPL
208514	2001 XJ_{117}	—	December 13, 2001	Socorro	LINEAR	·	1.4 km	MPC · JPL
208515	2001 XC_{121}	—	December 14, 2001	Socorro	LINEAR	·	1.1 km	MPC · JPL
208516	2001 XH_{127}	—	December 14, 2001	Socorro	LINEAR	THM	3.5 km	MPC · JPL
208517	2001 XQ_{129}	—	December 14, 2001	Socorro	LINEAR	CYB	3.4 km	MPC · JPL
208518	2001 XA_{150}	—	December 14, 2001	Socorro	LINEAR	·	2.5 km	MPC · JPL
208519	2001 XU_{190}	—	December 14, 2001	Socorro	LINEAR	PHO	1.5 km	MPC · JPL
208520	2001 XA_{196}	—	December 14, 2001	Socorro	LINEAR	·	1.2 km	MPC · JPL
208521	2001 XX_{197}	—	December 14, 2001	Socorro	LINEAR	·	1.3 km	MPC · JPL
208522	2001 XY_{203}	—	December 11, 2001	Socorro	LINEAR	·	1.0 km	MPC · JPL
208523	2001 XB_{214}	—	December 11, 2001	Socorro	LINEAR	·	1.1 km	MPC · JPL
208524	2001 XW_{222}	—	December 15, 2001	Socorro	LINEAR	·	880 m	MPC · JPL
208525	2001 XG_{223}	—	December 15, 2001	Socorro	LINEAR	·	5.4 km	MPC · JPL
208526	2001 XD_{245}	—	December 15, 2001	Socorro	LINEAR	·	4.0 km	MPC · JPL
208527	2001 XX_{248}	—	December 15, 2001	Cima Ekar	ADAS	PHO	1.6 km	MPC · JPL
208528	2001 YB_{42}	—	December 18, 2001	Socorro	LINEAR	(883)	1.1 km	MPC · JPL
208529	2001 YS_{78}	—	December 18, 2001	Socorro	LINEAR	·	810 m	MPC · JPL
208530	2001 YV_{85}	—	December 18, 2001	Socorro	LINEAR	·	1.1 km	MPC · JPL
208531	2001 YF_{99}	—	December 17, 2001	Socorro	LINEAR	·	2.1 km	MPC · JPL
208532	2001 YP_{121}	—	December 17, 2001	Socorro	LINEAR	·	840 m	MPC · JPL
208533	2001 YO_{125}	—	December 17, 2001	Socorro	LINEAR	·	970 m	MPC · JPL
208534	2001 YD_{129}	—	December 17, 2001	Socorro	LINEAR	·	1.2 km	MPC · JPL
208535	2001 YM_{134}	—	December 17, 2001	Socorro	LINEAR	·	1.1 km	MPC · JPL
208536	2001 YF_{151}	—	December 19, 2001	Socorro	LINEAR	EUP	7.9 km	MPC · JPL
208537	2001 YX_{152}	—	December 19, 2001	Palomar	NEAT	·	1.3 km	MPC · JPL
208538	2002 AX_{8}	—	January 9, 2002	Bohyunsan	Bohyunsan	·	570 m	MPC · JPL
208539	2002 AM_{13}	—	January 11, 2002	Desert Eagle	W. K. Y. Yeung	·	1.2 km	MPC · JPL
208540	2002 AY_{19}	—	January 9, 2002	Socorro	LINEAR	·	1.3 km	MPC · JPL
208541	2002 AZ_{40}	—	January 9, 2002	Socorro	LINEAR	·	1.2 km	MPC · JPL
208542	2002 AM_{66}	—	January 12, 2002	Socorro	LINEAR	·	4.6 km	MPC · JPL
208543	2002 AK_{84}	—	January 9, 2002	Socorro	LINEAR	·	1.2 km	MPC · JPL
208544	2002 AE_{92}	—	January 12, 2002	Cerro Tololo	Deep Lens Survey	·	1.4 km	MPC · JPL
208545	2002 AO_{99}	—	January 8, 2002	Socorro	LINEAR	·	940 m	MPC · JPL
208546	2002 AS_{103}	—	January 9, 2002	Socorro	LINEAR	·	1.9 km	MPC · JPL
208547	2002 AN_{109}	—	January 9, 2002	Socorro	LINEAR	PHO	3.2 km	MPC · JPL
208548	2002 AW_{110}	—	January 9, 2002	Socorro	LINEAR	·	1.0 km	MPC · JPL
208549	2002 AH_{111}	—	January 9, 2002	Socorro	LINEAR	·	990 m	MPC · JPL
208550	2002 AQ_{115}	—	January 9, 2002	Socorro	LINEAR	·	1.2 km	MPC · JPL
208551	2002 AJ_{126}	—	January 12, 2002	Socorro	LINEAR	·	1.6 km	MPC · JPL
208552	2002 AX_{126}	—	January 13, 2002	Socorro	LINEAR	·	980 m	MPC · JPL
208553	2002 AL_{165}	—	January 13, 2002	Socorro	LINEAR	·	1.3 km	MPC · JPL
208554	2002 AT_{177}	—	January 14, 2002	Socorro	LINEAR	·	1.1 km	MPC · JPL
208555	2002 AM_{178}	—	January 14, 2002	Socorro	LINEAR	·	1.3 km	MPC · JPL
208556	2002 AY_{178}	—	January 14, 2002	Socorro	LINEAR	MAS	1.1 km	MPC · JPL
208557	2002 AJ_{184}	—	January 7, 2002	Palomar	NEAT	·	1.1 km	MPC · JPL
208558	2002 AF_{186}	—	January 8, 2002	Socorro	LINEAR	·	1.1 km	MPC · JPL
208559	2002 AR_{202}	—	January 13, 2002	Socorro	LINEAR	·	1.1 km	MPC · JPL
208560	2002 AT_{205}	—	January 13, 2002	Apache Point	SDSS	·	4.6 km	MPC · JPL
208561	2002 BF_{20}	—	January 22, 2002	Socorro	LINEAR	PHO	1.7 km	MPC · JPL
208562	2002 BP_{29}	—	January 20, 2002	Anderson Mesa	LONEOS	·	1.4 km	MPC · JPL
208563	2002 CL_{4}	—	February 7, 2002	Socorro	LINEAR	·	1.1 km	MPC · JPL
208564	2002 CT_{10}	—	February 6, 2002	Socorro	LINEAR	PHO	1.7 km	MPC · JPL
208565	2002 CT_{11}	—	February 6, 2002	Socorro	LINEAR	APO +1km	1.3 km	MPC · JPL
208566	2002 CP_{19}	—	February 4, 2002	Palomar	NEAT	·	1.3 km	MPC · JPL
208567	2002 CQ_{20}	—	February 4, 2002	Haleakala	NEAT	·	1.1 km	MPC · JPL
208568	2002 CH_{22}	—	February 5, 2002	Palomar	NEAT	MAS	970 m	MPC · JPL
208569	2002 CF_{23}	—	February 5, 2002	Haleakala	NEAT	·	1.2 km	MPC · JPL
208570	2002 CR_{23}	—	February 6, 2002	Palomar	NEAT	·	1.1 km	MPC · JPL
208571	2002 CE_{24}	—	February 6, 2002	Haleakala	NEAT	·	1.4 km	MPC · JPL
208572	2002 CS_{30}	—	February 6, 2002	Socorro	LINEAR	·	890 m	MPC · JPL
208573	2002 CT_{31}	—	February 6, 2002	Socorro	LINEAR	·	1.0 km	MPC · JPL
208574	2002 CR_{32}	—	February 6, 2002	Socorro	LINEAR	·	1.3 km	MPC · JPL
208575	2002 CE_{33}	—	February 6, 2002	Socorro	LINEAR	·	1.2 km	MPC · JPL
208576	2002 CY_{34}	—	February 6, 2002	Socorro	LINEAR	·	1.2 km	MPC · JPL
208577	2002 CS_{69}	—	February 7, 2002	Socorro	LINEAR	·	1.2 km	MPC · JPL
208578	2002 CY_{69}	—	February 7, 2002	Socorro	LINEAR	·	2.3 km	MPC · JPL
208579	2002 CV_{73}	—	February 7, 2002	Socorro	LINEAR	·	1.2 km	MPC · JPL
208580	2002 CH_{79}	—	February 7, 2002	Socorro	LINEAR	·	1.2 km	MPC · JPL
208581	2002 CT_{79}	—	February 7, 2002	Socorro	LINEAR	·	1.5 km	MPC · JPL
208582	2002 CF_{93}	—	February 7, 2002	Socorro	LINEAR	·	1.2 km	MPC · JPL
208583	2002 CR_{94}	—	February 7, 2002	Socorro	LINEAR	·	890 m	MPC · JPL
208584	2002 CG_{95}	—	February 7, 2002	Socorro	LINEAR	·	1.0 km	MPC · JPL
208585	2002 CF_{100}	—	February 7, 2002	Socorro	LINEAR	·	1.1 km	MPC · JPL
208586	2002 CL_{114}	—	February 8, 2002	Socorro	LINEAR	·	1.5 km	MPC · JPL
208587	2002 CQ_{114}	—	February 8, 2002	Socorro	LINEAR	·	3.2 km	MPC · JPL
208588	2002 CJ_{115}	—	February 10, 2002	Socorro	LINEAR	PHO	1.5 km	MPC · JPL
208589	2002 CW_{117}	—	February 12, 2002	Desert Eagle	W. K. Y. Yeung	·	1.6 km	MPC · JPL
208590	2002 CN_{127}	—	February 7, 2002	Socorro	LINEAR	·	950 m	MPC · JPL
208591	2002 CO_{132}	—	February 7, 2002	Socorro	LINEAR	·	1.5 km	MPC · JPL
208592	2002 CW_{139}	—	February 8, 2002	Socorro	LINEAR	·	1.0 km	MPC · JPL
208593	2002 CQ_{140}	—	February 8, 2002	Socorro	LINEAR	·	1.1 km	MPC · JPL
208594	2002 CU_{140}	—	February 8, 2002	Socorro	LINEAR	·	900 m	MPC · JPL
208595	2002 CD_{142}	—	February 8, 2002	Socorro	LINEAR	·	3.5 km	MPC · JPL
208596	2002 CN_{143}	—	February 9, 2002	Socorro	LINEAR	·	1.0 km	MPC · JPL
208597	2002 CC_{159}	—	February 7, 2002	Socorro	LINEAR	NYS	1.2 km	MPC · JPL
208598	2002 CN_{159}	—	February 7, 2002	Socorro	LINEAR	·	1.5 km	MPC · JPL
208599	2002 CS_{160}	—	February 8, 2002	Socorro	LINEAR	·	1.3 km	MPC · JPL
208600	2002 CT_{161}	—	February 8, 2002	Socorro	LINEAR	·	1.1 km	MPC · JPL

== 208601–208700 ==
back to top

Designation			Discovery			Properties		Ref
Permanent	Provisional	Named after	Date	Site	Discoverer(s)	Category	Diam.	Ref
208601	2002 CQ_{199}	—	February 10, 2002	Socorro	LINEAR	BAP	1.2 km	MPC · JPL
208602	2002 CB_{208}	—	February 10, 2002	Socorro	LINEAR	·	1.2 km	MPC · JPL
208603	2002 CE_{210}	—	February 10, 2002	Socorro	LINEAR	·	920 m	MPC · JPL
208604	2002 CG_{211}	—	February 10, 2002	Socorro	LINEAR	·	1.1 km	MPC · JPL
208605	2002 CV_{215}	—	February 10, 2002	Socorro	LINEAR	·	900 m	MPC · JPL
208606	2002 CB_{218}	—	February 10, 2002	Socorro	LINEAR	V	1.0 km	MPC · JPL
208607	2002 CX_{223}	—	February 11, 2002	Socorro	LINEAR	·	1.1 km	MPC · JPL
208608	2002 CN_{236}	—	February 8, 2002	Socorro	LINEAR	·	1.0 km	MPC · JPL
208609	2002 CY_{243}	—	February 11, 2002	Socorro	LINEAR	·	1.3 km	MPC · JPL
208610	2002 CB_{254}	—	February 4, 2002	Cima Ekar	ADAS	·	950 m	MPC · JPL
208611	2002 CP_{256}	—	February 4, 2002	Palomar	NEAT	·	1.1 km	MPC · JPL
208612	2002 CR_{256}	—	February 4, 2002	Palomar	NEAT	·	970 m	MPC · JPL
208613	2002 CK_{265}	—	February 6, 2002	Anderson Mesa	LONEOS	·	1.6 km	MPC · JPL
208614	2002 CE_{270}	—	February 7, 2002	Kitt Peak	Spacewatch	V	920 m	MPC · JPL
208615	2002 DG_{6}	—	February 20, 2002	Kitt Peak	Spacewatch	NYS	840 m	MPC · JPL
208616	2002 DR_{15}	—	February 16, 2002	Palomar	NEAT	(2076)	1.6 km	MPC · JPL
208617	2002 EB_{3}	—	March 9, 2002	Socorro	LINEAR	APO +1km	940 m	MPC · JPL
208618	2002 EX_{4}	—	March 10, 2002	Cima Ekar	ADAS	·	1.1 km	MPC · JPL
208619	2002 EP_{13}	—	March 3, 2002	Haleakala	NEAT	·	2.8 km	MPC · JPL
208620	2002 EQ_{29}	—	March 9, 2002	Socorro	LINEAR	·	1.3 km	MPC · JPL
208621	2002 EL_{42}	—	March 12, 2002	Socorro	LINEAR	·	1.1 km	MPC · JPL
208622	2002 ET_{47}	—	March 12, 2002	Palomar	NEAT	·	1.4 km	MPC · JPL
208623	2002 EG_{49}	—	March 12, 2002	Palomar	NEAT	·	1.5 km	MPC · JPL
208624	2002 EZ_{49}	—	March 12, 2002	Palomar	NEAT	·	1.2 km	MPC · JPL
208625	2002 EW_{59}	—	March 13, 2002	Socorro	LINEAR	·	1.4 km	MPC · JPL
208626	2002 EU_{61}	—	March 13, 2002	Socorro	LINEAR	·	2.0 km	MPC · JPL
208627	2002 EJ_{72}	—	March 13, 2002	Socorro	LINEAR	·	1.8 km	MPC · JPL
208628	2002 EE_{80}	—	March 12, 2002	Palomar	NEAT	·	1.3 km	MPC · JPL
208629	2002 EY_{83}	—	March 9, 2002	Socorro	LINEAR	·	900 m	MPC · JPL
208630	2002 EA_{85}	—	March 9, 2002	Socorro	LINEAR	·	1.2 km	MPC · JPL
208631	2002 ED_{88}	—	March 9, 2002	Socorro	LINEAR	·	2.2 km	MPC · JPL
208632	2002 ET_{88}	—	March 9, 2002	Socorro	LINEAR	NYS	1.4 km	MPC · JPL
208633	2002 EC_{90}	—	March 12, 2002	Socorro	LINEAR	·	780 m	MPC · JPL
208634	2002 EF_{91}	—	March 12, 2002	Socorro	LINEAR	·	1.3 km	MPC · JPL
208635	2002 EC_{92}	—	March 13, 2002	Socorro	LINEAR	·	1.6 km	MPC · JPL
208636	2002 EE_{92}	—	March 13, 2002	Socorro	LINEAR	·	1.9 km	MPC · JPL
208637	2002 EA_{96}	—	March 15, 2002	Socorro	LINEAR	·	1.5 km	MPC · JPL
208638	2002 EJ_{100}	—	March 5, 2002	Kitt Peak	Spacewatch	NYS	1.6 km	MPC · JPL
208639	2002 EX_{100}	—	March 5, 2002	Haleakala	NEAT	·	1.4 km	MPC · JPL
208640	2002 EV_{102}	—	March 9, 2002	Palomar	NEAT	V	1.1 km	MPC · JPL
208641	2002 EY_{103}	—	March 9, 2002	Anderson Mesa	LONEOS	PHO	1.8 km	MPC · JPL
208642	2002 EZ_{103}	—	March 9, 2002	Anderson Mesa	LONEOS	·	3.3 km	MPC · JPL
208643	2002 EG_{106}	—	March 9, 2002	Anderson Mesa	LONEOS	·	1.5 km	MPC · JPL
208644	2002 EP_{108}	—	March 9, 2002	Palomar	NEAT	·	1.2 km	MPC · JPL
208645	2002 ET_{110}	—	March 9, 2002	Catalina	CSS	·	1.8 km	MPC · JPL
208646	2002 EE_{111}	—	March 9, 2002	Anderson Mesa	LONEOS	·	1.4 km	MPC · JPL
208647	2002 EX_{119}	—	March 10, 2002	Kitt Peak	Spacewatch	·	1.9 km	MPC · JPL
208648	2002 EP_{123}	—	March 12, 2002	Palomar	NEAT	·	920 m	MPC · JPL
208649	2002 EQ_{124}	—	March 12, 2002	Kitt Peak	Spacewatch	NYS	950 m	MPC · JPL
208650	2002 EX_{134}	—	March 13, 2002	Palomar	NEAT	·	1.2 km	MPC · JPL
208651	2002 EX_{151}	—	March 15, 2002	Kitt Peak	Spacewatch	·	2.2 km	MPC · JPL
208652	2002 ET_{155}	—	March 9, 2002	Socorro	LINEAR	·	2.8 km	MPC · JPL
208653	2002 FU_{3}	—	March 20, 2002	Desert Eagle	W. K. Y. Yeung	·	3.1 km	MPC · JPL
208654	2002 FZ_{8}	—	March 16, 2002	Socorro	LINEAR	·	2.2 km	MPC · JPL
208655	2002 FG_{12}	—	March 16, 2002	Socorro	LINEAR	·	1.1 km	MPC · JPL
208656	2002 FG_{13}	—	March 16, 2002	Socorro	LINEAR	V	1.0 km	MPC · JPL
208657	2002 FE_{16}	—	March 16, 2002	Haleakala	NEAT	·	1.4 km	MPC · JPL
208658	2002 FJ_{17}	—	March 17, 2002	Haleakala	NEAT	·	1.2 km	MPC · JPL
208659	2002 FX_{21}	—	March 19, 2002	Anderson Mesa	LONEOS	·	1.4 km	MPC · JPL
208660	2002 FU_{31}	—	March 19, 2002	Anderson Mesa	LONEOS	·	1.5 km	MPC · JPL
208661	2002 GE_{4}	—	April 9, 2002	Palomar	NEAT	·	1.2 km	MPC · JPL
208662	2002 GD_{6}	—	April 13, 2002	Palomar	NEAT	·	2.4 km	MPC · JPL
208663 Xuxiyuan	2002 GF_{11}	Xuxiyuan	April 12, 2002	Desert Eagle	W. K. Y. Yeung	PHO	2.1 km	MPC · JPL
208664 Koojunyup	2002 GN_{11}	Koojunyup	April 14, 2002	Desert Eagle	W. K. Y. Yeung	·	2.0 km	MPC · JPL
208665	2002 GJ_{12}	—	April 15, 2002	Kitt Peak	Spacewatch	PHO	1.7 km	MPC · JPL
208666	2002 GW_{15}	—	April 15, 2002	Socorro	LINEAR	·	2.0 km	MPC · JPL
208667	2002 GD_{17}	—	April 15, 2002	Socorro	LINEAR	NYS ·	3.4 km	MPC · JPL
208668	2002 GE_{26}	—	April 14, 2002	Socorro	LINEAR	·	1.7 km	MPC · JPL
208669	2002 GY_{37}	—	April 3, 2002	Kitt Peak	Spacewatch	PHO	1.5 km	MPC · JPL
208670	2002 GW_{47}	—	April 4, 2002	Kitt Peak	Spacewatch	·	1.5 km	MPC · JPL
208671	2002 GS_{48}	—	April 4, 2002	Palomar	NEAT	·	1.7 km	MPC · JPL
208672	2002 GW_{65}	—	April 8, 2002	Palomar	NEAT	·	1.3 km	MPC · JPL
208673	2002 GU_{70}	—	April 8, 2002	Palomar	NEAT	·	2.8 km	MPC · JPL
208674	2002 GG_{82}	—	April 10, 2002	Socorro	LINEAR	·	1.6 km	MPC · JPL
208675	2002 GW_{83}	—	April 10, 2002	Socorro	LINEAR	ERI	2.6 km	MPC · JPL
208676	2002 GN_{86}	—	April 10, 2002	Socorro	LINEAR	·	1.6 km	MPC · JPL
208677	2002 GE_{90}	—	April 8, 2002	Kitt Peak	Spacewatch	NYS	1.3 km	MPC · JPL
208678	2002 GC_{94}	—	April 9, 2002	Socorro	LINEAR	·	2.3 km	MPC · JPL
208679	2002 GD_{94}	—	April 9, 2002	Socorro	LINEAR	·	1.4 km	MPC · JPL
208680	2002 GZ_{94}	—	April 9, 2002	Socorro	LINEAR	V	960 m	MPC · JPL
208681	2002 GL_{97}	—	April 9, 2002	Kitt Peak	Spacewatch	·	1.8 km	MPC · JPL
208682	2002 GT_{105}	—	April 11, 2002	Anderson Mesa	LONEOS	·	1.8 km	MPC · JPL
208683	2002 GZ_{111}	—	April 10, 2002	Socorro	LINEAR	·	1.8 km	MPC · JPL
208684	2002 GE_{113}	—	April 11, 2002	Anderson Mesa	LONEOS	·	1.9 km	MPC · JPL
208685	2002 GG_{126}	—	April 12, 2002	Palomar	NEAT	MAS	1.0 km	MPC · JPL
208686	2002 GZ_{126}	—	April 12, 2002	Palomar	NEAT	·	1.4 km	MPC · JPL
208687	2002 GF_{127}	—	April 12, 2002	Socorro	LINEAR	·	3.1 km	MPC · JPL
208688	2002 GR_{140}	—	April 13, 2002	Palomar	NEAT	NYS	1.4 km	MPC · JPL
208689	2002 GR_{142}	—	April 13, 2002	Palomar	NEAT	MAS	930 m	MPC · JPL
208690	2002 GK_{150}	—	April 14, 2002	Socorro	LINEAR	·	1.3 km	MPC · JPL
208691	2002 GZ_{161}	—	April 14, 2002	Palomar	NEAT	·	2.1 km	MPC · JPL
208692	2002 GS_{163}	—	April 14, 2002	Kitt Peak	Spacewatch	NYS	1.1 km	MPC · JPL
208693	2002 GA_{164}	—	April 14, 2002	Palomar	NEAT	NYS	2.1 km	MPC · JPL
208694	2002 GB_{175}	—	April 11, 2002	Socorro	LINEAR	NYS	1.8 km	MPC · JPL
208695	2002 GZ_{181}	—	April 12, 2002	Palomar	NEAT	T_{j} (2.99) · 3:2	10 km	MPC · JPL
208696	2002 HS_{2}	—	April 16, 2002	Socorro	LINEAR	V	1.2 km	MPC · JPL
208697	2002 HS_{3}	—	April 16, 2002	Socorro	LINEAR	·	3.4 km	MPC · JPL
208698	2002 HW_{3}	—	April 16, 2002	Socorro	LINEAR	V	1.0 km	MPC · JPL
208699	2002 HG_{4}	—	April 16, 2002	Socorro	LINEAR	ERI	3.5 km	MPC · JPL
208700	2002 JK	—	May 3, 2002	Desert Eagle	W. K. Y. Yeung	PHO	1.6 km	MPC · JPL

== 208701–208800 ==
back to top

Designation			Discovery			Properties		Ref
Permanent	Provisional	Named after	Date	Site	Discoverer(s)	Category	Diam.	Ref
208701	2002 JB_{8}	—	May 6, 2002	Palomar	NEAT	·	2.5 km	MPC · JPL
208702	2002 JC_{23}	—	May 8, 2002	Socorro	LINEAR	·	1.3 km	MPC · JPL
208703	2002 JL_{24}	—	May 8, 2002	Socorro	LINEAR	·	1.6 km	MPC · JPL
208704	2002 JT_{30}	—	May 9, 2002	Socorro	LINEAR	V	1.1 km	MPC · JPL
208705	2002 JX_{33}	—	May 9, 2002	Socorro	LINEAR	·	1.7 km	MPC · JPL
208706	2002 JS_{42}	—	May 8, 2002	Socorro	LINEAR	·	1.7 km	MPC · JPL
208707	2002 JL_{51}	—	May 9, 2002	Socorro	LINEAR	NYS	1.3 km	MPC · JPL
208708	2002 JT_{55}	—	May 9, 2002	Socorro	LINEAR	MAS	1.0 km	MPC · JPL
208709	2002 JD_{61}	—	May 8, 2002	Socorro	LINEAR	MAS	1.5 km	MPC · JPL
208710	2002 JR_{69}	—	May 7, 2002	Socorro	LINEAR	·	1.9 km	MPC · JPL
208711	2002 JG_{74}	—	May 8, 2002	Socorro	LINEAR	PHO	1.8 km	MPC · JPL
208712	2002 JR_{77}	—	May 11, 2002	Socorro	LINEAR	V	1.0 km	MPC · JPL
208713	2002 JM_{83}	—	May 11, 2002	Socorro	LINEAR	·	1.7 km	MPC · JPL
208714	2002 JF_{95}	—	May 11, 2002	Socorro	LINEAR	NYS	1.9 km	MPC · JPL
208715	2002 JW_{95}	—	May 11, 2002	Socorro	LINEAR	NYS	1.6 km	MPC · JPL
208716	2002 JZ_{95}	—	May 11, 2002	Socorro	LINEAR	NYS	1.8 km	MPC · JPL
208717	2002 JD_{104}	—	May 10, 2002	Socorro	LINEAR	MAS	1.1 km	MPC · JPL
208718	2002 JP_{105}	—	May 12, 2002	Socorro	LINEAR	·	1.9 km	MPC · JPL
208719	2002 JJ_{114}	—	May 14, 2002	Palomar	NEAT	MAS	970 m	MPC · JPL
208720	2002 JS_{114}	—	May 13, 2002	Socorro	LINEAR	·	2.3 km	MPC · JPL
208721	2002 JT_{117}	—	May 4, 2002	Anderson Mesa	LONEOS	PHO	1.8 km	MPC · JPL
208722	2002 JD_{119}	—	May 5, 2002	Palomar	NEAT	PHO	1.5 km	MPC · JPL
208723	2002 JP_{130}	—	May 8, 2002	Socorro	LINEAR	·	1.9 km	MPC · JPL
208724	2002 JV_{130}	—	May 8, 2002	Kitt Peak	Spacewatch	CLA	2.2 km	MPC · JPL
208725	2002 JY_{141}	—	May 11, 2002	Socorro	LINEAR	NYS	2.0 km	MPC · JPL
208726	2002 KD_{3}	—	May 18, 2002	Palomar	NEAT	MAS	900 m	MPC · JPL
208727	2002 KZ_{3}	—	May 18, 2002	Socorro	LINEAR	PHO	1.7 km	MPC · JPL
208728	2002 LO_{1}	—	June 2, 2002	Palomar	NEAT	·	1.4 km	MPC · JPL
208729	2002 LK_{8}	—	June 5, 2002	Socorro	LINEAR	V	1.2 km	MPC · JPL
208730	2002 LJ_{26}	—	June 6, 2002	Socorro	LINEAR	·	1.6 km	MPC · JPL
208731	2002 LY_{29}	—	June 9, 2002	Haleakala	NEAT	(5)	2.0 km	MPC · JPL
208732	2002 LS_{30}	—	June 3, 2002	Palomar	NEAT	·	2.2 km	MPC · JPL
208733	2002 LS_{50}	—	June 7, 2002	Haleakala	NEAT	·	4.4 km	MPC · JPL
208734	2002 NY_{13}	—	July 4, 2002	Palomar	NEAT	·	3.6 km	MPC · JPL
208735	2002 NJ_{17}	—	July 13, 2002	Socorro	LINEAR	H	820 m	MPC · JPL
208736	2002 NL_{24}	—	July 9, 2002	Socorro	LINEAR	·	2.1 km	MPC · JPL
208737	2002 NX_{25}	—	July 9, 2002	Socorro	LINEAR	·	2.0 km	MPC · JPL
208738	2002 NS_{26}	—	July 9, 2002	Socorro	LINEAR	·	3.5 km	MPC · JPL
208739	2002 NF_{30}	—	July 5, 2002	Socorro	LINEAR	·	1.9 km	MPC · JPL
208740	2002 NA_{34}	—	July 14, 2002	Palomar	NEAT	·	1.8 km	MPC · JPL
208741	2002 NA_{38}	—	July 9, 2002	Socorro	LINEAR	·	4.1 km	MPC · JPL
208742	2002 NA_{44}	—	July 11, 2002	Campo Imperatore	CINEOS	·	2.0 km	MPC · JPL
208743	2002 NL_{47}	—	July 14, 2002	Palomar	NEAT	·	2.0 km	MPC · JPL
208744	2002 NL_{56}	—	July 9, 2002	Socorro	LINEAR	·	1.6 km	MPC · JPL
208745	2002 NV_{60}	—	July 14, 2002	Palomar	NEAT	·	1.2 km	MPC · JPL
208746	2002 NW_{60}	—	July 8, 2002	Palomar	NEAT	·	2.2 km	MPC · JPL
208747	2002 NK_{62}	—	July 3, 2002	Palomar	NEAT	·	5.9 km	MPC · JPL
208748	2002 NO_{67}	—	July 5, 2002	Palomar	NEAT	·	1.4 km	MPC · JPL
208749	2002 OD_{5}	—	July 16, 2002	Bergisch Gladbach	W. Bickel	·	2.8 km	MPC · JPL
208750	2002 OW_{5}	—	July 20, 2002	Palomar	NEAT	·	2.0 km	MPC · JPL
208751	2002 OD_{17}	—	July 18, 2002	Socorro	LINEAR	·	4.6 km	MPC · JPL
208752	2002 PC_{4}	—	August 4, 2002	Palomar	NEAT	·	2.3 km	MPC · JPL
208753	2002 PG_{5}	—	August 4, 2002	Palomar	NEAT	·	3.1 km	MPC · JPL
208754	2002 PY_{11}	—	August 4, 2002	Palomar	NEAT	H	680 m	MPC · JPL
208755	2002 PF_{15}	—	August 6, 2002	Palomar	NEAT	·	1.4 km	MPC · JPL
208756	2002 PK_{15}	—	August 6, 2002	Palomar	NEAT	·	2.0 km	MPC · JPL
208757	2002 PR_{43}	—	August 4, 2002	Socorro	LINEAR	H	1.1 km	MPC · JPL
208758	2002 PU_{48}	—	August 10, 2002	Socorro	LINEAR	·	6.2 km	MPC · JPL
208759	2002 PO_{59}	—	August 10, 2002	Socorro	LINEAR	·	2.7 km	MPC · JPL
208760	2002 PB_{62}	—	August 8, 2002	Palomar	NEAT	·	1.9 km	MPC · JPL
208761	2002 PF_{64}	—	August 3, 2002	Palomar	NEAT	·	2.1 km	MPC · JPL
208762	2002 PP_{65}	—	August 5, 2002	Palomar	NEAT	·	2.3 km	MPC · JPL
208763	2002 PA_{74}	—	August 12, 2002	Socorro	LINEAR	·	2.9 km	MPC · JPL
208764	2002 PT_{86}	—	August 13, 2002	Cottage Grove	Tenagra	·	3.3 km	MPC · JPL
208765	2002 PP_{87}	—	August 13, 2002	Socorro	LINEAR	H	800 m	MPC · JPL
208766	2002 PP_{106}	—	August 12, 2002	Socorro	LINEAR	BRA	1.6 km	MPC · JPL
208767	2002 PY_{109}	—	August 13, 2002	Socorro	LINEAR	·	2.0 km	MPC · JPL
208768	2002 PZ_{109}	—	August 13, 2002	Socorro	LINEAR	·	3.0 km	MPC · JPL
208769	2002 PK_{113}	—	August 14, 2002	Socorro	LINEAR	MAR	1.5 km	MPC · JPL
208770	2002 PO_{115}	—	August 13, 2002	Anderson Mesa	LONEOS	·	3.7 km	MPC · JPL
208771	2002 PE_{126}	—	August 14, 2002	Socorro	LINEAR	·	3.6 km	MPC · JPL
208772	2002 PR_{134}	—	August 14, 2002	Socorro	LINEAR	·	2.7 km	MPC · JPL
208773	2002 PZ_{137}	—	August 15, 2002	Socorro	LINEAR	·	2.7 km	MPC · JPL
208774	2002 PG_{140}	—	August 14, 2002	Socorro	LINEAR	·	1.9 km	MPC · JPL
208775	2002 PL_{142}	—	August 14, 2002	Socorro	LINEAR	H	720 m	MPC · JPL
208776	2002 PL_{156}	—	August 8, 2002	Palomar	S. F. Hönig	·	2.3 km	MPC · JPL
208777	2002 PT_{165}	—	August 8, 2002	Palomar	Lowe, A.	·	1.8 km	MPC · JPL
208778	2002 PF_{167}	—	August 8, 2002	Palomar	NEAT	·	2.5 km	MPC · JPL
208779	2002 PB_{178}	—	August 8, 2002	Palomar	NEAT	·	1.5 km	MPC · JPL
208780	2002 PO_{184}	—	August 15, 2002	Palomar	NEAT	·	1.5 km	MPC · JPL
208781	2002 QS_{2}	—	August 16, 2002	Haleakala	NEAT	·	2.1 km	MPC · JPL
208782	2002 QZ_{8}	—	August 19, 2002	Palomar	NEAT	·	2.8 km	MPC · JPL
208783	2002 QV_{9}	—	August 20, 2002	Palomar	NEAT	·	2.5 km	MPC · JPL
208784	2002 QK_{10}	—	August 17, 2002	Palomar	NEAT	(23255)	4.9 km	MPC · JPL
208785	2002 QQ_{13}	—	August 26, 2002	Palomar	NEAT	·	2.1 km	MPC · JPL
208786	2002 QA_{32}	—	August 29, 2002	Palomar	NEAT	·	2.2 km	MPC · JPL
208787	2002 QX_{32}	—	August 29, 2002	Palomar	NEAT	·	1.6 km	MPC · JPL
208788	2002 QL_{36}	—	August 28, 2002	Palomar	NEAT	·	2.4 km	MPC · JPL
208789	2002 QJ_{38}	—	August 30, 2002	Kitt Peak	Spacewatch	·	2.4 km	MPC · JPL
208790	2002 QV_{46}	—	August 30, 2002	Palomar	NEAT	·	2.7 km	MPC · JPL
208791	2002 QT_{49}	—	August 29, 2002	Palomar	R. Matson	·	2.3 km	MPC · JPL
208792	2002 QJ_{61}	—	August 17, 2002	Palomar	NEAT	·	2.8 km	MPC · JPL
208793	2002 QF_{65}	—	August 17, 2002	Palomar	NEAT	·	1.3 km	MPC · JPL
208794	2002 QV_{68}	—	August 27, 2002	Palomar	NEAT	·	2.7 km	MPC · JPL
208795	2002 QG_{69}	—	August 18, 2002	Palomar	NEAT	·	1.7 km	MPC · JPL
208796	2002 QC_{71}	—	August 18, 2002	Palomar	NEAT	·	1.8 km	MPC · JPL
208797	2002 QL_{72}	—	August 28, 2002	Palomar	NEAT	·	1.2 km	MPC · JPL
208798	2002 QN_{74}	—	August 29, 2002	Palomar	NEAT	·	2.4 km	MPC · JPL
208799	2002 QL_{78}	—	August 27, 2002	Palomar	NEAT	·	2.0 km	MPC · JPL
208800	2002 QP_{78}	—	August 18, 2002	Palomar	NEAT	·	2.0 km	MPC · JPL

== 208801–208900 ==
back to top

Designation			Discovery			Properties		Ref
Permanent	Provisional	Named after	Date	Site	Discoverer(s)	Category	Diam.	Ref
208801	2002 QU_{90}	—	August 30, 2002	Palomar	NEAT	·	4.5 km	MPC · JPL
208802	2002 QD_{91}	—	August 30, 2002	Palomar	NEAT	WIT	1.4 km	MPC · JPL
208803	2002 QL_{91}	—	August 17, 2002	Palomar	NEAT	·	1.6 km	MPC · JPL
208804	2002 QW_{92}	—	August 29, 2002	Palomar	NEAT	·	1.7 km	MPC · JPL
208805	2002 QY_{95}	—	August 18, 2002	Palomar	NEAT	·	1.8 km	MPC · JPL
208806	2002 QT_{99}	—	August 29, 2002	Palomar	NEAT	·	1.9 km	MPC · JPL
208807	2002 QN_{105}	—	August 29, 2002	Palomar	NEAT	·	1.7 km	MPC · JPL
208808	2002 QL_{107}	—	August 16, 2002	Palomar	NEAT	·	2.4 km	MPC · JPL
208809	2002 QW_{109}	—	August 17, 2002	Palomar	NEAT	·	1.8 km	MPC · JPL
208810	2002 QB_{119}	—	August 18, 2002	Palomar	NEAT	·	2.0 km	MPC · JPL
208811	2002 RQ	—	September 3, 2002	Ondřejov	P. Kušnirák	·	3.2 km	MPC · JPL
208812	2002 RE_{3}	—	September 4, 2002	Anderson Mesa	LONEOS	MIS	3.3 km	MPC · JPL
208813	2002 RF_{6}	—	September 1, 2002	Haleakala	NEAT	·	1.7 km	MPC · JPL
208814	2002 RR_{7}	—	September 3, 2002	Haleakala	NEAT	·	1.9 km	MPC · JPL
208815	2002 RX_{10}	—	September 4, 2002	Palomar	NEAT	MAS	1.3 km	MPC · JPL
208816	2002 RV_{12}	—	September 4, 2002	Anderson Mesa	LONEOS	·	3.0 km	MPC · JPL
208817	2002 RQ_{14}	—	September 4, 2002	Anderson Mesa	LONEOS	MAR	1.5 km	MPC · JPL
208818	2002 RF_{16}	—	September 4, 2002	Anderson Mesa	LONEOS	·	3.3 km	MPC · JPL
208819	2002 RV_{16}	—	September 4, 2002	Anderson Mesa	LONEOS	·	3.1 km	MPC · JPL
208820	2002 RY_{19}	—	September 4, 2002	Anderson Mesa	LONEOS	·	2.9 km	MPC · JPL
208821	2002 RF_{20}	—	September 4, 2002	Anderson Mesa	LONEOS	·	4.7 km	MPC · JPL
208822	2002 RX_{26}	—	September 5, 2002	Socorro	LINEAR	H	720 m	MPC · JPL
208823	2002 RJ_{27}	—	September 4, 2002	Palomar	NEAT	·	680 m	MPC · JPL
208824	2002 RK_{40}	—	September 5, 2002	Socorro	LINEAR	·	2.6 km	MPC · JPL
208825	2002 RZ_{40}	—	September 5, 2002	Socorro	LINEAR	·	2.2 km	MPC · JPL
208826	2002 RK_{41}	—	September 5, 2002	Socorro	LINEAR	·	3.1 km	MPC · JPL
208827	2002 RP_{43}	—	September 5, 2002	Socorro	LINEAR	EUN	1.7 km	MPC · JPL
208828	2002 RM_{46}	—	September 5, 2002	Socorro	LINEAR	·	3.1 km	MPC · JPL
208829	2002 RW_{52}	—	September 5, 2002	Socorro	LINEAR	·	1.9 km	MPC · JPL
208830	2002 RB_{58}	—	September 5, 2002	Anderson Mesa	LONEOS	·	2.3 km	MPC · JPL
208831	2002 RM_{68}	—	September 4, 2002	Anderson Mesa	LONEOS	·	3.1 km	MPC · JPL
208832	2002 RV_{71}	—	September 5, 2002	Socorro	LINEAR	·	1.9 km	MPC · JPL
208833	2002 RZ_{79}	—	September 5, 2002	Socorro	LINEAR	GAL	2.3 km	MPC · JPL
208834	2002 RN_{114}	—	September 5, 2002	Socorro	LINEAR	EUN	2.0 km	MPC · JPL
208835	2002 RL_{122}	—	September 8, 2002	Haleakala	NEAT	·	2.9 km	MPC · JPL
208836	2002 RY_{131}	—	September 11, 2002	Palomar	NEAT	·	5.7 km	MPC · JPL
208837	2002 RJ_{139}	—	September 10, 2002	Haleakala	NEAT	·	2.8 km	MPC · JPL
208838	2002 RL_{144}	—	September 11, 2002	Palomar	NEAT	·	2.3 km	MPC · JPL
208839	2002 RA_{157}	—	September 11, 2002	Palomar	NEAT	·	2.3 km	MPC · JPL
208840	2002 RH_{158}	—	September 11, 2002	Palomar	NEAT	WIT	1.2 km	MPC · JPL
208841	2002 RH_{159}	—	September 11, 2002	Palomar	NEAT	·	3.1 km	MPC · JPL
208842	2002 RY_{165}	—	September 13, 2002	Palomar	NEAT	AEO	1.5 km	MPC · JPL
208843	2002 RL_{167}	—	September 13, 2002	Palomar	NEAT	MAR	2.3 km	MPC · JPL
208844	2002 RV_{171}	—	September 13, 2002	Kitt Peak	Spacewatch	(18466)	3.2 km	MPC · JPL
208845	2002 RJ_{175}	—	September 13, 2002	Palomar	NEAT	·	2.1 km	MPC · JPL
208846	2002 RB_{177}	—	September 13, 2002	Palomar	NEAT	PAD	4.0 km	MPC · JPL
208847	2002 RD_{194}	—	September 12, 2002	Palomar	NEAT	·	2.2 km	MPC · JPL
208848	2002 RG_{196}	—	September 12, 2002	Palomar	NEAT	·	2.5 km	MPC · JPL
208849	2002 RN_{205}	—	September 14, 2002	Haleakala	NEAT	·	1.8 km	MPC · JPL
208850	2002 RS_{228}	—	September 14, 2002	Haleakala	NEAT	HNS	1.8 km	MPC · JPL
208851	2002 RY_{244}	—	September 15, 2002	Palomar	NEAT	·	2.8 km	MPC · JPL
208852	2002 RV_{246}	—	September 14, 2002	Palomar	NEAT	·	2.1 km	MPC · JPL
208853	2002 RF_{265}	—	September 15, 2002	Palomar	NEAT	·	2.6 km	MPC · JPL
208854	2002 RX_{274}	—	September 4, 2002	Palomar	NEAT	·	1.5 km	MPC · JPL
208855	2002 RJ_{275}	—	September 4, 2002	Palomar	NEAT	(13314)	2.2 km	MPC · JPL
208856	2002 SV_{9}	—	September 27, 2002	Palomar	NEAT	(29841)	2.3 km	MPC · JPL
208857	2002 SC_{14}	—	September 27, 2002	Palomar	NEAT	PAD	2.3 km	MPC · JPL
208858	2002 SN_{22}	—	September 26, 2002	Palomar	NEAT	·	3.0 km	MPC · JPL
208859	2002 SE_{24}	—	September 27, 2002	Palomar	NEAT	·	3.1 km	MPC · JPL
208860	2002 SO_{26}	—	September 29, 2002	Haleakala	NEAT	·	2.8 km	MPC · JPL
208861	2002 SH_{32}	—	September 28, 2002	Haleakala	NEAT	·	3.9 km	MPC · JPL
208862	2002 SM_{38}	—	September 30, 2002	Socorro	LINEAR	WIT	1.4 km	MPC · JPL
208863	2002 SM_{42}	—	September 28, 2002	Haleakala	NEAT	·	2.6 km	MPC · JPL
208864	2002 SB_{48}	—	September 30, 2002	Socorro	LINEAR	·	3.0 km	MPC · JPL
208865	2002 SA_{63}	—	September 16, 2002	Palomar	R. Matson	AGN	1.7 km	MPC · JPL
208866	2002 SV_{70}	—	September 16, 2002	Palomar	NEAT	·	1.7 km	MPC · JPL
208867	2002 TK_{1}	—	October 1, 2002	Anderson Mesa	LONEOS	MRX	1.7 km	MPC · JPL
208868	2002 TL_{4}	—	October 1, 2002	Socorro	LINEAR	·	3.0 km	MPC · JPL
208869	2002 TR_{11}	—	October 1, 2002	Anderson Mesa	LONEOS	NEM	3.4 km	MPC · JPL
208870	2002 TA_{15}	—	October 1, 2002	Haleakala	NEAT	PAD	2.0 km	MPC · JPL
208871	2002 TX_{15}	—	October 2, 2002	Socorro	LINEAR	·	2.8 km	MPC · JPL
208872	2002 TX_{31}	—	October 2, 2002	Socorro	LINEAR	AGN	2.3 km	MPC · JPL
208873	2002 TP_{33}	—	October 2, 2002	Socorro	LINEAR	615	1.8 km	MPC · JPL
208874	2002 TL_{41}	—	October 2, 2002	Socorro	LINEAR	H	860 m	MPC · JPL
208875	2002 TV_{43}	—	October 2, 2002	Socorro	LINEAR	·	3.8 km	MPC · JPL
208876	2002 TD_{46}	—	October 2, 2002	Haleakala	NEAT	·	2.5 km	MPC · JPL
208877	2002 TP_{55}	—	October 2, 2002	Haleakala	NEAT	·	2.9 km	MPC · JPL
208878	2002 TX_{57}	—	October 2, 2002	Haleakala	NEAT	·	3.1 km	MPC · JPL
208879	2002 TF_{58}	—	October 4, 2002	Socorro	LINEAR	·	1.3 km	MPC · JPL
208880	2002 TJ_{65}	—	October 4, 2002	Socorro	LINEAR	·	3.1 km	MPC · JPL
208881	2002 TC_{71}	—	October 3, 2002	Palomar	NEAT	slow	1.8 km	MPC · JPL
208882	2002 TU_{77}	—	October 1, 2002	Anderson Mesa	LONEOS	·	1.7 km	MPC · JPL
208883	2002 TK_{86}	—	October 2, 2002	Campo Imperatore	CINEOS	(5)	1.9 km	MPC · JPL
208884	2002 TG_{90}	—	October 3, 2002	Palomar	NEAT	·	1.9 km	MPC · JPL
208885	2002 TU_{93}	—	October 3, 2002	Socorro	LINEAR	·	2.6 km	MPC · JPL
208886	2002 TD_{95}	—	October 3, 2002	Socorro	LINEAR	HOF	3.9 km	MPC · JPL
208887	2002 TZ_{97}	—	October 3, 2002	Palomar	NEAT	·	3.0 km	MPC · JPL
208888	2002 TT_{98}	—	October 3, 2002	Socorro	LINEAR	·	2.4 km	MPC · JPL
208889	2002 TU_{99}	—	October 4, 2002	Socorro	LINEAR	·	2.2 km	MPC · JPL
208890	2002 TB_{112}	—	October 3, 2002	Socorro	LINEAR	·	3.9 km	MPC · JPL
208891	2002 TS_{113}	—	October 3, 2002	Palomar	NEAT	·	5.1 km	MPC · JPL
208892	2002 TD_{116}	—	October 3, 2002	Palomar	NEAT	·	3.7 km	MPC · JPL
208893	2002 TG_{118}	—	October 3, 2002	Palomar	NEAT	GEF	1.5 km	MPC · JPL
208894	2002 TE_{120}	—	October 3, 2002	Palomar	NEAT	·	4.7 km	MPC · JPL
208895	2002 TC_{125}	—	October 4, 2002	Socorro	LINEAR	·	1.8 km	MPC · JPL
208896	2002 TO_{133}	—	October 4, 2002	Anderson Mesa	LONEOS	·	3.1 km	MPC · JPL
208897	2002 TM_{141}	—	October 3, 2002	Socorro	LINEAR	H	690 m	MPC · JPL
208898	2002 TK_{148}	—	October 5, 2002	Palomar	NEAT	·	3.3 km	MPC · JPL
208899	2002 TF_{149}	—	October 5, 2002	Palomar	NEAT	·	3.0 km	MPC · JPL
208900	2002 TD_{152}	—	October 5, 2002	Palomar	NEAT	·	2.1 km	MPC · JPL

== 208901–209000 ==
back to top

Designation			Discovery			Properties		Ref
Permanent	Provisional	Named after	Date	Site	Discoverer(s)	Category	Diam.	Ref
208901	2002 TQ_{159}	—	October 5, 2002	Palomar	NEAT	·	4.1 km	MPC · JPL
208902	2002 TA_{161}	—	October 5, 2002	Palomar	NEAT	·	3.8 km	MPC · JPL
208903	2002 TU_{161}	—	October 5, 2002	Palomar	NEAT	·	2.7 km	MPC · JPL
208904	2002 TS_{170}	—	October 3, 2002	Palomar	NEAT	H	1.1 km	MPC · JPL
208905	2002 TJ_{200}	—	October 9, 2002	Bergisch Gladbach	W. Bickel	HOF	3.0 km	MPC · JPL
208906	2002 TT_{209}	—	October 6, 2002	Haleakala	NEAT	·	2.4 km	MPC · JPL
208907	2002 TO_{219}	—	October 5, 2002	Socorro	LINEAR	·	1.6 km	MPC · JPL
208908	2002 TR_{224}	—	October 8, 2002	Anderson Mesa	LONEOS	·	3.5 km	MPC · JPL
208909	2002 TP_{239}	—	October 9, 2002	Socorro	LINEAR	·	2.8 km	MPC · JPL
208910	2002 TF_{249}	—	October 7, 2002	Socorro	LINEAR	·	1.6 km	MPC · JPL
208911	2002 TR_{279}	—	October 10, 2002	Socorro	LINEAR	·	4.4 km	MPC · JPL
208912	2002 TN_{281}	—	October 10, 2002	Socorro	LINEAR	·	2.8 km	MPC · JPL
208913	2002 TF_{290}	—	October 10, 2002	Socorro	LINEAR	JUN	1.5 km	MPC · JPL
208914	2002 TD_{313}	—	October 4, 2002	Apache Point	SDSS	·	3.6 km	MPC · JPL
208915 Andrewashcraft	2002 TU_{314}	Andrewashcraft	October 4, 2002	Apache Point	SDSS	·	2.8 km	MPC · JPL
208916 Robertcaldwell	2002 TN_{317}	Robertcaldwell	October 5, 2002	Apache Point	SDSS	·	3.2 km	MPC · JPL
208917 Traviscarter	2002 TX_{362}	Traviscarter	October 10, 2002	Apache Point	SDSS	·	2.3 km	MPC · JPL
208918	2002 TO_{380}	—	October 5, 2002	Palomar	NEAT	·	1.8 km	MPC · JPL
208919	2002 UW_{1}	—	October 28, 2002	Nogales	C. W. Juels, P. R. Holvorcem	AGN	1.7 km	MPC · JPL
208920	2002 US_{2}	—	October 28, 2002	Socorro	LINEAR	H	1.1 km	MPC · JPL
208921	2002 UA_{9}	—	October 28, 2002	Palomar	NEAT	·	4.5 km	MPC · JPL
208922	2002 UH_{10}	—	October 28, 2002	Haleakala	NEAT	·	5.6 km	MPC · JPL
208923	2002 UZ_{11}	—	October 30, 2002	Socorro	LINEAR	H	1.0 km	MPC · JPL
208924	2002 UB_{32}	—	October 30, 2002	Haleakala	NEAT	·	3.0 km	MPC · JPL
208925	2002 UF_{32}	—	October 30, 2002	Haleakala	NEAT	·	3.1 km	MPC · JPL
208926	2002 UO_{36}	—	October 31, 2002	Anderson Mesa	LONEOS	·	2.2 km	MPC · JPL
208927	2002 UW_{47}	—	October 31, 2002	Anderson Mesa	LONEOS	WIT	1.8 km	MPC · JPL
208928	2002 UF_{73}	—	October 31, 2002	Palomar	NEAT	·	2.1 km	MPC · JPL
208929	2002 UJ_{74}	—	October 30, 2002	Palomar	NEAT	KOR	1.5 km	MPC · JPL
208930	2002 UU_{76}	—	October 31, 2002	Haleakala	NEAT	HOF	4.3 km	MPC · JPL
208931	2002 VB_{3}	—	November 1, 2002	La Palma	La Palma	·	2.7 km	MPC · JPL
208932	2002 VA_{5}	—	November 3, 2002	Haleakala	NEAT	·	5.2 km	MPC · JPL
208933	2002 VJ_{12}	—	November 4, 2002	Anderson Mesa	LONEOS	·	5.4 km	MPC · JPL
208934	2002 VR_{27}	—	November 5, 2002	Anderson Mesa	LONEOS	·	3.6 km	MPC · JPL
208935	2002 VS_{38}	—	November 5, 2002	Socorro	LINEAR	·	2.3 km	MPC · JPL
208936	2002 VG_{42}	—	November 5, 2002	Palomar	NEAT	·	3.0 km	MPC · JPL
208937	2002 VQ_{43}	—	November 4, 2002	Palomar	NEAT	·	2.8 km	MPC · JPL
208938	2002 VV_{44}	—	November 4, 2002	La Palma	La Palma	·	2.1 km	MPC · JPL
208939	2002 VR_{50}	—	November 6, 2002	Anderson Mesa	LONEOS	·	4.7 km	MPC · JPL
208940	2002 VE_{57}	—	November 6, 2002	Haleakala	NEAT	AGN	1.5 km	MPC · JPL
208941	2002 VA_{59}	—	November 6, 2002	Needville	Needville	MIS	3.4 km	MPC · JPL
208942	2002 VT_{59}	—	November 3, 2002	Haleakala	NEAT	·	2.6 km	MPC · JPL
208943	2002 VY_{95}	—	November 11, 2002	Anderson Mesa	LONEOS	·	4.8 km	MPC · JPL
208944	2002 VH_{106}	—	November 12, 2002	Socorro	LINEAR	TIR	4.3 km	MPC · JPL
208945	2002 VK_{111}	—	November 13, 2002	Socorro	LINEAR	·	4.1 km	MPC · JPL
208946	2002 VO_{116}	—	November 13, 2002	Palomar	NEAT	DOR	4.9 km	MPC · JPL
208947	2002 VQ_{122}	—	November 13, 2002	Palomar	NEAT	·	2.7 km	MPC · JPL
208948	2002 VA_{140}	—	November 13, 2002	Palomar	NEAT	EOS	2.9 km	MPC · JPL
208949	2002 VS_{140}	—	November 12, 2002	Palomar	NEAT	EOS	2.5 km	MPC · JPL
208950	2002 VP_{141}	—	November 14, 2002	Palomar	NEAT	EOS	3.1 km	MPC · JPL
208951	2002 WE_{2}	—	November 23, 2002	Palomar	NEAT	KOR	2.2 km	MPC · JPL
208952	2002 WU_{4}	—	November 21, 2002	Palomar	NEAT	EOS	2.8 km	MPC · JPL
208953	2002 WA_{6}	—	November 24, 2002	Palomar	NEAT	·	3.4 km	MPC · JPL
208954	2002 WE_{7}	—	November 24, 2002	Palomar	NEAT	·	5.4 km	MPC · JPL
208955	2002 WM_{22}	—	November 25, 2002	Palomar	NEAT	AGN	1.5 km	MPC · JPL
208956	2002 XV	—	December 1, 2002	Socorro	LINEAR	·	2.5 km	MPC · JPL
208957	2002 XE_{10}	—	December 2, 2002	Haleakala	NEAT	·	2.2 km	MPC · JPL
208958	2002 XW_{10}	—	December 3, 2002	Palomar	NEAT	·	3.2 km	MPC · JPL
208959	2002 XG_{12}	—	December 3, 2002	Palomar	NEAT	·	4.5 km	MPC · JPL
208960	2002 XC_{14}	—	December 2, 2002	Haleakala	NEAT	EUP	6.8 km	MPC · JPL
208961	2002 XY_{14}	—	December 7, 2002	Desert Eagle	W. K. Y. Yeung	·	5.6 km	MPC · JPL
208962	2002 XK_{28}	—	December 5, 2002	Socorro	LINEAR	TEL	5.7 km	MPC · JPL
208963	2002 XX_{56}	—	December 10, 2002	Socorro	LINEAR	·	3.3 km	MPC · JPL
208964	2002 XS_{58}	—	December 11, 2002	Socorro	LINEAR	·	5.3 km	MPC · JPL
208965	2002 XF_{61}	—	December 10, 2002	Socorro	LINEAR	·	3.2 km	MPC · JPL
208966	2002 XX_{63}	—	December 11, 2002	Socorro	LINEAR	H	940 m	MPC · JPL
208967	2002 XC_{76}	—	December 11, 2002	Socorro	LINEAR	·	3.6 km	MPC · JPL
208968	2002 XR_{76}	—	December 11, 2002	Socorro	LINEAR	·	4.3 km	MPC · JPL
208969	2002 XW_{82}	—	December 13, 2002	Socorro	LINEAR	·	3.9 km	MPC · JPL
208970	2002 XR_{91}	—	December 4, 2002	Kitt Peak	M. W. Buie	EUP · slow	6.3 km	MPC · JPL
208971	2002 XP_{92}	—	December 5, 2002	Kitt Peak	M. W. Buie	·	5.1 km	MPC · JPL
208972	2002 XB_{95}	—	December 5, 2002	Socorro	LINEAR	·	9.5 km	MPC · JPL
208973	2002 XL_{100}	—	December 5, 2002	Socorro	LINEAR	·	2.9 km	MPC · JPL
208974	2002 XM_{118}	—	December 3, 2002	Palomar	NEAT	KOR	2.1 km	MPC · JPL
208975	2002 YE	—	December 27, 2002	Anderson Mesa	LONEOS	LIX	6.3 km	MPC · JPL
208976	2002 YC_{5}	—	December 28, 2002	Socorro	LINEAR	T_{j} (2.98)	4.3 km	MPC · JPL
208977	2002 YA_{10}	—	December 31, 2002	Socorro	LINEAR	·	5.0 km	MPC · JPL
208978	2002 YO_{15}	—	December 31, 2002	Socorro	LINEAR	EUP	6.6 km	MPC · JPL
208979	2002 YN_{18}	—	December 31, 2002	Socorro	LINEAR	·	3.1 km	MPC · JPL
208980	2002 YP_{22}	—	December 31, 2002	Socorro	LINEAR	·	6.3 km	MPC · JPL
208981	2002 YZ_{25}	—	December 31, 2002	Socorro	LINEAR	THM	3.2 km	MPC · JPL
208982	2003 AV_{8}	—	January 3, 2003	Socorro	LINEAR	EUP	5.9 km	MPC · JPL
208983	2003 AZ_{8}	—	January 3, 2003	Socorro	LINEAR	EUP	3.5 km	MPC · JPL
208984	2003 AP_{11}	—	January 1, 2003	Socorro	LINEAR	·	6.4 km	MPC · JPL
208985	2003 AT_{11}	—	January 1, 2003	Socorro	LINEAR	·	3.9 km	MPC · JPL
208986	2003 AJ_{14}	—	January 2, 2003	Socorro	LINEAR	EMA	5.9 km	MPC · JPL
208987	2003 AV_{21}	—	January 5, 2003	Socorro	LINEAR	·	4.7 km	MPC · JPL
208988	2003 AU_{26}	—	January 4, 2003	Socorro	LINEAR	·	3.2 km	MPC · JPL
208989	2003 AC_{54}	—	January 5, 2003	Socorro	LINEAR	HYG	4.7 km	MPC · JPL
208990	2003 AO_{54}	—	January 5, 2003	Socorro	LINEAR	·	4.5 km	MPC · JPL
208991	2003 AD_{61}	—	January 7, 2003	Socorro	LINEAR	·	4.7 km	MPC · JPL
208992	2003 AX_{64}	—	January 7, 2003	Socorro	LINEAR	T_{j} (2.99) · EUP	6.5 km	MPC · JPL
208993	2003 AZ_{69}	—	January 8, 2003	Socorro	LINEAR	·	2.7 km	MPC · JPL
208994	2003 AY_{71}	—	January 10, 2003	Socorro	LINEAR	THB	6.0 km	MPC · JPL
208995	2003 AV_{81}	—	January 12, 2003	Anderson Mesa	LONEOS	TIR	4.9 km	MPC · JPL
208996 Achlys	2003 AZ_{84}	Achlys	January 13, 2003	Palomar	C. A. Trujillo, M. E. Brown	plutino · moon	723 km	MPC · JPL
208997	2003 AN_{88}	—	January 1, 2003	Socorro	LINEAR	·	3.7 km	MPC · JPL
208998	2003 AW_{88}	—	January 3, 2003	Socorro	LINEAR	EUP	7.2 km	MPC · JPL
208999	2003 BC_{1}	—	January 24, 2003	Pla D'Arguines	R. Ferrando	·	5.8 km	MPC · JPL
209000	2003 BY_{7}	—	January 26, 2003	Kitt Peak	Spacewatch	·	6.7 km	MPC · JPL

back to top

== See also ==
- Meanings of minor-planet names: 208001–209000
