= Meanings of minor-planet names: 208001–209000 =

As minor planet discoveries are confirmed, they are given a permanent number by the IAU's Minor Planet Center (MPC), and the discoverers can then submit names for them, following the IAU's naming conventions. The list below concerns those minor planets in the specified number-range that have received names, and explains the meanings of those names.

Official naming citations of newly named small Solar System bodies are approved and published in a bulletin by IAU's Working Group for Small Bodies Nomenclature (WGSBN). Before May 2021, citations were published in MPC's Minor Planet Circulars for many decades. Recent citations can also be found on the JPL Small-Body Database (SBDB). Until his death in 2016, German astronomer Lutz D. Schmadel compiled these citations into the Dictionary of Minor Planet Names (DMP) and regularly updated the collection.

Based on Paul Herget's The Names of the Minor Planets, Schmadel also researched the unclear origin of numerous asteroids, most of which had been named prior to World War II. This article incorporates text from this source, which is in the public domain: SBDB New namings may only be added to this list below after official publication as the preannouncement of names is condemned. The WGSBN publishes a comprehensive guideline for the naming rules of non-cometary small Solar System bodies.

== 208001–208100 ==
Named minor planet	Provisional	This minor planet was named for...	Ref · Catalog
There are no named minor planets in this number range

== 208101–208200 ==
back to top

Named minor planet	Provisional	This minor planet was named for...	Ref · Catalog
208117 Davidgerdes	2000 CJ_{119}	David W. Gerdes (b. 1964), an American astrophysicist.	IAU · 208117
208196 Matthiashahn	2000 QM_{246}	Matthias K. Hahn (b. 1984), a German planetary scientist.	IAU · 208196

== 208201–208300 ==
back to top

Named minor planet	Provisional	This minor planet was named for...	Ref · Catalog
There are no named minor planets in this number range

== 208301–208400 ==
back to top

Named minor planet	Provisional	This minor planet was named for...	Ref · Catalog
208351 Sielmann	2001 RO_{15}	Heinz Sielmann (1917–2006), German wildlife photographer, zoologist and documentary filmmaker.	JPL · 208351

== 208401–208500 ==
back to top

Named minor planet	Provisional	This minor planet was named for...	Ref · Catalog
208425 Zehavi	2001 SF_{353}	Idit Zehavi (born 1969), an Israel-American astrophysicist and a contributor to the Sloan Digital Sky Survey	JPL · 208425
208499 Shokasonjuku	2001 WN_{2}	The Shōkasonjuku Academy, a former private school located in Hagi city, Yamaguchi prefecture	MPC · 208499

== 208501–208600 ==
back to top

Named minor planet	Provisional	This minor planet was named for...	Ref · Catalog
There are no named minor planets in this number range

== 208601–208700 ==
back to top

Named minor planet	Provisional	This minor planet was named for...	Ref · Catalog
208663 Xuxiyuan	2002 GF_{11}	Xu Xiyuan (1976–2025), Taiwanese actress and television host professionally known as Barbie Hsu.	IAU · 208663
208664 Koojunyup	2002 GN_{11}	Koo Junyup, South Korean musician and DJ best known as a member of the duo Clon, which helped shaped the early evolution of K-pop dance music in the 1990s.	IAU · 208664

== 208701–208800 ==
back to top

Named minor planet	Provisional	This minor planet was named for...	Ref · Catalog
There are no named minor planets in this number range

== 208801–208900 ==
back to top

Named minor planet	Provisional	This minor planet was named for...	Ref · Catalog
There are no named minor planets in this number range

== 208901–209000 ==
back to top

Named minor planet	Provisional	This minor planet was named for...	Ref · Catalog
208915 Andrewashcraft	2002 TU_{314}	Andrew Ashcraft (1984–2013), one of the 19 Granite Mountain Hotshots, who lost their lives fighting the 2013 Yarnell Hill Fire in Arizona	JPL · 208915
208916 Robertcaldwell	2002 TN_{317}	Robert Caldwell (1990–2013), one of the 19 Granite Mountain Hotshots, who lost their lives fighting the 2013 Yarnell Hill Fire in Arizona	JPL · 208916
208917 Traviscarter	2002 TX_{362}	Travis Carter (1982–2013), one of the 19 Granite Mountain Hotshots, who lost their lives fighting the 2013 Yarnell Hill Fire in Arizona	JPL · 208917
208996 Achlys	2003 AZ_{84}	Achlys is a personification of sorrow and grief described in the Greek epic poem, the Shield of Heracles.	IAU · 208996

back to top

Preceded by 207,001–208,000	Meanings of minor-planet names List of minor planets: 208,001–209,000	Succeeded by 209,001–210,000
