= List of minor planets: 481001–482000 =

The following is a partial list of minor planets, running from minor-planet number 481001 through 482000, inclusive. The primary data for this and other partial lists is based on JPL's "Small-Body Orbital Elements" and data available from the Minor Planet Center. Critical list information is also provided by the MPC, unless otherwise specified from Lowell Observatory. A detailed description of the table's columns and additional sources are given on the main page including a complete list of every page in this series, and a statistical break-up on the dynamical classification of minor planets.

Also see the summary list of all named bodies in numerical and alphabetical order, and the corresponding naming citations for the number range of this particular list. New namings may only be added to this list after official publication, as the preannouncement of names is condemned by the Working Group for Small Bodies Nomenclature of the International Astronomical Union.

Near-Earth obj.	MBA (inner)	MBA (outer)	Centaur
Mars-crosser	MBA (middle)	Jupiter trojan	Trans-Neptunian obj.
Unclassified

== 481001–481100 ==
Designation			Discovery			Properties		Ref
Permanent	Provisional	Named after	Date	Site	Discoverer(s)	Category	Diam.	Ref
481001	2004 FX_{97}	—	March 23, 2004	Socorro	LINEAR	H	540 m	MPC · JPL
481002	2004 GR_{25}	—	April 14, 2004	Kitt Peak	Spacewatch	·	2.0 km	MPC · JPL
481003	2004 HV_{24}	—	March 26, 2004	Kitt Peak	Spacewatch	GEF	1.0 km	MPC · JPL
481004	2004 JU_{30}	—	May 15, 2004	Socorro	LINEAR	T_{j} (2.94)	3.3 km	MPC · JPL
481005	2004 PX_{82}	—	August 10, 2004	Socorro	LINEAR	EOS	1.9 km	MPC · JPL
481006	2004 RV_{7}	—	September 6, 2004	St. Véran	St. Veran	·	3.3 km	MPC · JPL
481007	2004 RS_{86}	—	September 7, 2004	Kitt Peak	Spacewatch	EOS	1.8 km	MPC · JPL
481008	2004 RS_{99}	—	August 9, 2004	Socorro	LINEAR	PHO	980 m	MPC · JPL
481009	2004 RQ_{123}	—	September 7, 2004	Palomar	NEAT	TIR	2.3 km	MPC · JPL
481010	2004 RU_{149}	—	September 9, 2004	Socorro	LINEAR	·	970 m	MPC · JPL
481011	2004 RS_{151}	—	August 25, 2004	Kitt Peak	Spacewatch	V	560 m	MPC · JPL
481012	2004 RW_{161}	—	September 11, 2004	Socorro	LINEAR	·	3.6 km	MPC · JPL
481013	2004 RB_{206}	—	August 11, 2004	Socorro	LINEAR	PHO	1.3 km	MPC · JPL
481014	2004 RG_{208}	—	September 11, 2004	Socorro	LINEAR	·	1.6 km	MPC · JPL
481015	2004 RK_{246}	—	September 10, 2004	Kitt Peak	Spacewatch	·	3.1 km	MPC · JPL
481016	2004 RE_{260}	—	September 10, 2004	Kitt Peak	Spacewatch	·	2.3 km	MPC · JPL
481017	2004 TF_{35}	—	October 4, 2004	Kitt Peak	Spacewatch	·	1.1 km	MPC · JPL
481018	2004 TK_{62}	—	September 22, 2004	Kitt Peak	Spacewatch	·	2.1 km	MPC · JPL
481019	2004 TO_{85}	—	October 5, 2004	Kitt Peak	Spacewatch	·	2.4 km	MPC · JPL
481020	2004 TZ_{105}	—	October 7, 2004	Socorro	LINEAR	·	4.4 km	MPC · JPL
481021	2004 TH_{168}	—	October 7, 2004	Socorro	LINEAR	PHO	900 m	MPC · JPL
481022	2004 TL_{287}	—	October 9, 2004	Socorro	LINEAR	MAS	960 m	MPC · JPL
481023	2004 TJ_{370}	—	October 8, 2004	Kitt Peak	Spacewatch	·	2.9 km	MPC · JPL
481024	2004 UH_{6}	—	October 20, 2004	Socorro	LINEAR	T_{j} (2.98)	4.0 km	MPC · JPL
481025	2004 VA_{1}	—	November 3, 2004	Socorro	LINEAR	APO	260 m	MPC · JPL
481026	2004 VL_{56}	—	November 4, 2004	Kitt Peak	Spacewatch	·	3.4 km	MPC · JPL
481027	2004 XN_{44}	—	December 13, 2004	Mauna Kea	D. J. Tholen	AMO	660 m	MPC · JPL
481028	2004 XB_{73}	—	December 9, 2004	Catalina	CSS	·	3.8 km	MPC · JPL
481029	2004 XB_{76}	—	December 10, 2004	Kitt Peak	Spacewatch	·	1.0 km	MPC · JPL
481030	2004 YE_{12}	—	December 18, 2004	Mount Lemmon	Mount Lemmon Survey	·	1.4 km	MPC · JPL
481031	2004 YL_{23}	—	December 19, 2004	Mount Lemmon	Mount Lemmon Survey	L5	9.1 km	MPC · JPL
481032	2004 YZ_{23}	—	December 22, 2004	Siding Spring	SSS	T_{j} (2.18) · AMO · CYB · +1km	3.3 km	MPC · JPL
481033	2005 AM_{29}	—	January 15, 2005	Kvistaberg	Uppsala-DLR Asteroid Survey	·	1.2 km	MPC · JPL
481034	2005 AP_{73}	—	January 15, 2005	Kitt Peak	Spacewatch	·	1.3 km	MPC · JPL
481035	2005 AM_{76}	—	January 15, 2005	Kitt Peak	Spacewatch	·	770 m	MPC · JPL
481036	2005 BO_{35}	—	January 16, 2005	Mauna Kea	Veillet, C.	·	1.4 km	MPC · JPL
481037	2005 CJ_{31}	—	February 1, 2005	Kitt Peak	Spacewatch	·	1.1 km	MPC · JPL
481038	2005 CP_{68}	—	February 2, 2005	Catalina	CSS	·	1.2 km	MPC · JPL
481039	2005 EE_{41}	—	March 1, 2005	Catalina	CSS	·	1.5 km	MPC · JPL
481040	2005 EG_{77}	—	March 3, 2005	Kitt Peak	Spacewatch	·	640 m	MPC · JPL
481041	2005 EC_{184}	—	March 9, 2005	Mount Lemmon	Mount Lemmon Survey	·	930 m	MPC · JPL
481042	2005 EK_{190}	—	January 13, 2005	Kitt Peak	Spacewatch	·	1.2 km	MPC · JPL
481043	2005 ER_{192}	—	March 11, 2005	Mount Lemmon	Mount Lemmon Survey	EUN	990 m	MPC · JPL
481044	2005 EG_{225}	—	March 15, 2005	Catalina	CSS	·	1.6 km	MPC · JPL
481045	2005 EW_{283}	—	March 11, 2005	Mount Lemmon	Mount Lemmon Survey	·	1.2 km	MPC · JPL
481046	2005 FE_{4}	—	March 18, 2005	Catalina	CSS	·	1.6 km	MPC · JPL
481047	2005 FT_{8}	—	March 31, 2005	Catalina	CSS	·	1.7 km	MPC · JPL
481048	2005 GA_{10}	—	April 1, 2005	Siding Spring	SSS	·	2.5 km	MPC · JPL
481049	2005 GS_{12}	—	April 1, 2005	Anderson Mesa	LONEOS	·	1.8 km	MPC · JPL
481050	2005 GV_{32}	—	April 4, 2005	Socorro	LINEAR	·	730 m	MPC · JPL
481051	2005 GU_{109}	—	April 5, 2005	Mount Lemmon	Mount Lemmon Survey	·	1.6 km	MPC · JPL
481052	2005 HD_{4}	—	April 30, 2005	Siding Spring	SSS	AMO	270 m	MPC · JPL
481053	2005 JP_{45}	—	May 3, 2005	Kitt Peak	Deep Lens Survey	H	450 m	MPC · JPL
481054	2005 JV_{57}	—	May 7, 2005	Kitt Peak	Spacewatch	EUN	1.1 km	MPC · JPL
481055	2005 JP_{102}	—	May 9, 2005	Kitt Peak	Spacewatch	·	2.5 km	MPC · JPL
481056	2005 LH_{31}	—	June 13, 2005	Mount Lemmon	Mount Lemmon Survey	JUN · fast	1.2 km	MPC · JPL
481057	2005 LS_{41}	—	June 12, 2005	Kitt Peak	Spacewatch	·	2.5 km	MPC · JPL
481058	2005 MM_{24}	—	June 30, 2005	Kitt Peak	Spacewatch	H	480 m	MPC · JPL
481059	2005 MW_{29}	—	June 29, 2005	Kitt Peak	Spacewatch	·	4.4 km	MPC · JPL
481060	2005 MX_{36}	—	June 30, 2005	Kitt Peak	Spacewatch	·	2.7 km	MPC · JPL
481061	2005 NA_{14}	—	July 5, 2005	Kitt Peak	Spacewatch	V	650 m	MPC · JPL
481062	2005 NG_{80}	—	July 6, 2005	Siding Spring	SSS	·	850 m	MPC · JPL
481063	2005 OC_{3}	—	July 28, 2005	Palomar	NEAT	·	1.0 km	MPC · JPL
481064	2005 QU_{4}	—	July 25, 2005	Siding Spring	SSS	·	770 m	MPC · JPL
481065	2005 QY_{23}	—	August 27, 2005	Kitt Peak	Spacewatch	·	750 m	MPC · JPL
481066	2005 QW_{54}	—	August 28, 2005	Kitt Peak	Spacewatch	·	810 m	MPC · JPL
481067	2005 QA_{59}	—	August 25, 2005	Palomar	NEAT	NYS	930 m	MPC · JPL
481068	2005 QW_{133}	—	August 28, 2005	Kitt Peak	Spacewatch	·	610 m	MPC · JPL
481069	2005 QU_{139}	—	August 28, 2005	Kitt Peak	Spacewatch	·	1.7 km	MPC · JPL
481070	2005 QM_{140}	—	August 28, 2005	Kitt Peak	Spacewatch	·	890 m	MPC · JPL
481071	2005 QJ_{163}	—	August 30, 2005	Kitt Peak	Spacewatch	·	740 m	MPC · JPL
481072	2005 QM_{187}	—	August 31, 2005	Kitt Peak	Spacewatch	·	1.9 km	MPC · JPL
481073	2005 RK	—	September 1, 2005	Anderson Mesa	LONEOS	T_{j} (2.96)	3.1 km	MPC · JPL
481074	2005 SL_{11}	—	September 23, 2005	Kitt Peak	Spacewatch	·	1.8 km	MPC · JPL
481075	2005 ST_{14}	—	September 25, 2005	Goodricke-Pigott	R. A. Tucker	·	2.7 km	MPC · JPL
481076	2005 SV_{19}	—	September 25, 2005	Kingsnake	J. V. McClusky	·	3.5 km	MPC · JPL
481077	2005 SC_{35}	—	September 23, 2005	Kitt Peak	Spacewatch	NYS	970 m	MPC · JPL
481078	2005 SB_{37}	—	September 24, 2005	Kitt Peak	Spacewatch	EOS	1.5 km	MPC · JPL
481079	2005 SC_{85}	—	September 24, 2005	Kitt Peak	Spacewatch	·	3.1 km	MPC · JPL
481080	2005 SE_{92}	—	September 24, 2005	Kitt Peak	Spacewatch	·	2.1 km	MPC · JPL
481081	2005 SX_{95}	—	September 25, 2005	Kitt Peak	Spacewatch	V	540 m	MPC · JPL
481082	2005 SA_{98}	—	September 25, 2005	Kitt Peak	Spacewatch	·	850 m	MPC · JPL
481083	2005 SQ_{131}	—	September 24, 2005	Kitt Peak	Spacewatch	·	3.0 km	MPC · JPL
481084	2005 SV_{134}	—	September 29, 2005	Mount Lemmon	Mount Lemmon Survey	·	800 m	MPC · JPL
481085	2005 SA_{135}	—	September 30, 2005	Catalina	CSS	·	1.5 km	MPC · JPL
481086	2005 SL_{141}	—	September 25, 2005	Kitt Peak	Spacewatch	·	1.7 km	MPC · JPL
481087	2005 SC_{150}	—	September 25, 2005	Kitt Peak	Spacewatch	·	900 m	MPC · JPL
481088	2005 SW_{168}	—	September 29, 2005	Kitt Peak	Spacewatch	·	2.0 km	MPC · JPL
481089	2005 SB_{172}	—	September 29, 2005	Kitt Peak	Spacewatch	·	1.9 km	MPC · JPL
481090	2005 SY_{173}	—	September 29, 2005	Anderson Mesa	LONEOS	·	870 m	MPC · JPL
481091	2005 SU_{174}	—	September 29, 2005	Kitt Peak	Spacewatch	·	2.0 km	MPC · JPL
481092	2005 SB_{186}	—	September 29, 2005	Mount Lemmon	Mount Lemmon Survey	·	800 m	MPC · JPL
481093	2005 SO_{207}	—	September 30, 2005	Kitt Peak	Spacewatch	·	930 m	MPC · JPL
481094	2005 SU_{230}	—	September 30, 2005	Mount Lemmon	Mount Lemmon Survey	·	2.2 km	MPC · JPL
481095	2005 SX_{233}	—	September 30, 2005	Mount Lemmon	Mount Lemmon Survey	·	2.4 km	MPC · JPL
481096	2005 SN_{235}	—	September 29, 2005	Kitt Peak	Spacewatch	·	800 m	MPC · JPL
481097	2005 SW_{235}	—	September 29, 2005	Kitt Peak	Spacewatch	·	830 m	MPC · JPL
481098	2005 SE_{263}	—	September 23, 2005	Kitt Peak	Spacewatch	NYS	850 m	MPC · JPL
481099	2005 ST_{289}	—	September 29, 2005	Siding Spring	SSS	·	3.3 km	MPC · JPL
481100	2005 SJ_{290}	—	September 29, 2005	Mount Lemmon	Mount Lemmon Survey	·	670 m	MPC · JPL

== 481101–481200 ==
back to top

Designation			Discovery			Properties		Ref
Permanent	Provisional	Named after	Date	Site	Discoverer(s)	Category	Diam.	Ref
481101	2005 TL_{2}	—	October 1, 2005	Catalina	CSS	·	710 m	MPC · JPL
481102	2005 TG_{3}	—	October 1, 2005	Socorro	LINEAR	·	940 m	MPC · JPL
481103	2005 TY_{20}	—	October 1, 2005	Mount Lemmon	Mount Lemmon Survey	·	730 m	MPC · JPL
481104	2005 TD_{54}	—	September 24, 2005	Kitt Peak	Spacewatch	·	860 m	MPC · JPL
481105	2005 TK_{78}	—	October 7, 2005	Catalina	CSS	·	2.6 km	MPC · JPL
481106	2005 TK_{95}	—	October 6, 2005	Kitt Peak	Spacewatch	·	2.7 km	MPC · JPL
481107	2005 TH_{102}	—	October 7, 2005	Mount Lemmon	Mount Lemmon Survey	·	3.5 km	MPC · JPL
481108	2005 TA_{103}	—	September 29, 2005	Mount Lemmon	Mount Lemmon Survey	·	850 m	MPC · JPL
481109	2005 TT_{111}	—	September 27, 2005	Kitt Peak	Spacewatch	·	680 m	MPC · JPL
481110	2005 TY_{119}	—	October 7, 2005	Kitt Peak	Spacewatch	·	2.1 km	MPC · JPL
481111	2005 TG_{121}	—	October 7, 2005	Kitt Peak	Spacewatch	THM	2.2 km	MPC · JPL
481112	2005 TZ_{124}	—	October 7, 2005	Kitt Peak	Spacewatch	·	2.1 km	MPC · JPL
481113	2005 TD_{125}	—	October 7, 2005	Kitt Peak	Spacewatch	·	700 m	MPC · JPL
481114	2005 TY_{127}	—	September 30, 2005	Kitt Peak	Spacewatch	·	2.0 km	MPC · JPL
481115	2005 TL_{129}	—	October 7, 2005	Kitt Peak	Spacewatch	·	1.7 km	MPC · JPL
481116	2005 TW_{130}	—	September 24, 2005	Kitt Peak	Spacewatch	EOS	1.6 km	MPC · JPL
481117	2005 TM_{140}	—	October 8, 2005	Kitt Peak	Spacewatch	·	1.8 km	MPC · JPL
481118	2005 TM_{141}	—	October 8, 2005	Kitt Peak	Spacewatch	·	3.1 km	MPC · JPL
481119	2005 TS_{143}	—	October 8, 2005	Kitt Peak	Spacewatch	·	790 m	MPC · JPL
481120	2005 TF_{145}	—	September 29, 2005	Kitt Peak	Spacewatch	·	1.1 km	MPC · JPL
481121	2005 TU_{153}	—	October 7, 2005	Mount Lemmon	Mount Lemmon Survey	·	1.9 km	MPC · JPL
481122	2005 TL_{163}	—	September 26, 2005	Kitt Peak	Spacewatch	·	940 m	MPC · JPL
481123	2005 TR_{171}	—	October 10, 2005	Catalina	CSS	·	1.2 km	MPC · JPL
481124	2005 TX_{186}	—	October 3, 2005	Kitt Peak	Spacewatch	EOS	1.7 km	MPC · JPL
481125	2005 TL_{190}	—	October 7, 2005	Anderson Mesa	LONEOS	·	890 m	MPC · JPL
481126	2005 UV_{2}	—	October 23, 2005	Palomar	NEAT	PHO	2.3 km	MPC · JPL
481127	2005 UJ_{6}	—	October 28, 2005	Catalina	CSS	APO	180 m	MPC · JPL
481128	2005 UA_{8}	—	October 6, 2005	Mount Lemmon	Mount Lemmon Survey	·	960 m	MPC · JPL
481129	2005 UV_{10}	—	October 12, 2005	Kitt Peak	Spacewatch	·	3.0 km	MPC · JPL
481130	2005 UF_{11}	—	October 1, 2005	Mount Lemmon	Mount Lemmon Survey	MAS	750 m	MPC · JPL
481131	2005 UB_{21}	—	October 23, 2005	Kitt Peak	Spacewatch	·	770 m	MPC · JPL
481132	2005 UU_{24}	—	September 30, 2005	Mount Lemmon	Mount Lemmon Survey	V	750 m	MPC · JPL
481133	2005 UE_{25}	—	October 5, 2005	Kitt Peak	Spacewatch	·	930 m	MPC · JPL
481134	2005 UC_{39}	—	October 24, 2005	Kitt Peak	Spacewatch	·	790 m	MPC · JPL
481135	2005 UO_{43}	—	October 22, 2005	Kitt Peak	Spacewatch	H	420 m	MPC · JPL
481136	2005 UG_{57}	—	October 24, 2005	Anderson Mesa	LONEOS	·	910 m	MPC · JPL
481137	2005 UU_{59}	—	October 25, 2005	Kitt Peak	Spacewatch	·	3.1 km	MPC · JPL
481138	2005 UJ_{63}	—	October 25, 2005	Mount Lemmon	Mount Lemmon Survey	·	2.9 km	MPC · JPL
481139	2005 UM_{67}	—	October 22, 2005	Palomar	NEAT	·	890 m	MPC · JPL
481140	2005 UN_{79}	—	October 25, 2005	Catalina	CSS	·	2.4 km	MPC · JPL
481141	2005 UZ_{83}	—	October 22, 2005	Kitt Peak	Spacewatch	EOS	1.7 km	MPC · JPL
481142	2005 UL_{92}	—	October 22, 2005	Kitt Peak	Spacewatch	·	1.0 km	MPC · JPL
481143	2005 UE_{103}	—	October 22, 2005	Kitt Peak	Spacewatch	H	530 m	MPC · JPL
481144	2005 UM_{104}	—	October 22, 2005	Kitt Peak	Spacewatch	·	1.0 km	MPC · JPL
481145	2005 UX_{113}	—	October 22, 2005	Kitt Peak	Spacewatch	·	3.7 km	MPC · JPL
481146	2005 UJ_{119}	—	October 24, 2005	Kitt Peak	Spacewatch	·	1.1 km	MPC · JPL
481147	2005 UM_{121}	—	October 24, 2005	Kitt Peak	Spacewatch	·	1.5 km	MPC · JPL
481148	2005 UT_{129}	—	October 24, 2005	Kitt Peak	Spacewatch	·	840 m	MPC · JPL
481149	2005 UA_{131}	—	October 24, 2005	Kitt Peak	Spacewatch	·	3.8 km	MPC · JPL
481150	2005 UQ_{147}	—	October 26, 2005	Kitt Peak	Spacewatch	·	1.7 km	MPC · JPL
481151	2005 UQ_{152}	—	October 23, 2005	Catalina	CSS	NYS	1 km	MPC · JPL
481152	2005 UH_{160}	—	October 22, 2005	Catalina	CSS	·	850 m	MPC · JPL
481153	2005 UW_{162}	—	September 29, 2005	Kitt Peak	Spacewatch	·	1.7 km	MPC · JPL
481154	2005 UT_{167}	—	October 6, 2005	Mount Lemmon	Mount Lemmon Survey	·	1.9 km	MPC · JPL
481155	2005 UD_{174}	—	October 24, 2005	Kitt Peak	Spacewatch	·	3.3 km	MPC · JPL
481156	2005 UU_{182}	—	October 24, 2005	Kitt Peak	Spacewatch	·	2.7 km	MPC · JPL
481157	2005 UT_{183}	—	October 25, 2005	Mount Lemmon	Mount Lemmon Survey	PHO	750 m	MPC · JPL
481158	2005 UY_{188}	—	October 27, 2005	Mount Lemmon	Mount Lemmon Survey	NYS	710 m	MPC · JPL
481159	2005 UO_{191}	—	October 27, 2005	Mount Lemmon	Mount Lemmon Survey	·	630 m	MPC · JPL
481160	2005 UX_{194}	—	October 22, 2005	Kitt Peak	Spacewatch	·	2.1 km	MPC · JPL
481161	2005 UW_{196}	—	October 24, 2005	Kitt Peak	Spacewatch	·	3.2 km	MPC · JPL
481162	2005 UJ_{202}	—	October 25, 2005	Kitt Peak	Spacewatch	·	810 m	MPC · JPL
481163	2005 UF_{203}	—	October 25, 2005	Kitt Peak	Spacewatch	MAS	550 m	MPC · JPL
481164	2005 UF_{210}	—	October 27, 2005	Kitt Peak	Spacewatch	·	2.3 km	MPC · JPL
481165	2005 UZ_{211}	—	October 27, 2005	Kitt Peak	Spacewatch	THM	2.1 km	MPC · JPL
481166	2005 UO_{212}	—	October 22, 2005	Kitt Peak	Spacewatch	·	1.8 km	MPC · JPL
481167	2005 UE_{221}	—	October 25, 2005	Kitt Peak	Spacewatch	·	830 m	MPC · JPL
481168	2005 UK_{221}	—	October 25, 2005	Kitt Peak	Spacewatch	·	1.0 km	MPC · JPL
481169	2005 UB_{229}	—	October 25, 2005	Kitt Peak	Spacewatch	·	1.9 km	MPC · JPL
481170	2005 UJ_{230}	—	October 25, 2005	Kitt Peak	Spacewatch	(8737)	3.2 km	MPC · JPL
481171	2005 UM_{231}	—	October 25, 2005	Mount Lemmon	Mount Lemmon Survey	THM	1.6 km	MPC · JPL
481172	2005 UF_{232}	—	October 25, 2005	Mount Lemmon	Mount Lemmon Survey	·	870 m	MPC · JPL
481173	2005 UF_{237}	—	October 25, 2005	Kitt Peak	Spacewatch	·	2.0 km	MPC · JPL
481174	2005 UQ_{239}	—	October 25, 2005	Kitt Peak	Spacewatch	·	2.6 km	MPC · JPL
481175	2005 UB_{246}	—	October 27, 2005	Anderson Mesa	LONEOS	·	1.1 km	MPC · JPL
481176	2005 UP_{261}	—	September 23, 2005	Kitt Peak	Spacewatch	·	2.1 km	MPC · JPL
481177	2005 UO_{264}	—	October 27, 2005	Kitt Peak	Spacewatch	·	730 m	MPC · JPL
481178	2005 UM_{267}	—	October 27, 2005	Kitt Peak	Spacewatch	·	2.8 km	MPC · JPL
481179	2005 UD_{277}	—	September 30, 2005	Mount Lemmon	Mount Lemmon Survey	·	2.2 km	MPC · JPL
481180	2005 UX_{279}	—	October 24, 2005	Kitt Peak	Spacewatch	fast	3.8 km	MPC · JPL
481181	2005 UY_{291}	—	October 26, 2005	Kitt Peak	Spacewatch	·	1.0 km	MPC · JPL
481182	2005 UK_{307}	—	October 27, 2005	Mount Lemmon	Mount Lemmon Survey	·	2.0 km	MPC · JPL
481183	2005 UP_{316}	—	October 25, 2005	Kitt Peak	Spacewatch	·	980 m	MPC · JPL
481184	2005 UO_{323}	—	October 28, 2005	Kitt Peak	Spacewatch	·	2.7 km	MPC · JPL
481185	2005 UG_{327}	—	October 29, 2005	Kitt Peak	Spacewatch	·	2.6 km	MPC · JPL
481186	2005 UU_{333}	—	October 29, 2005	Mount Lemmon	Mount Lemmon Survey	·	2.6 km	MPC · JPL
481187	2005 UR_{336}	—	October 25, 2005	Catalina	CSS	·	940 m	MPC · JPL
481188	2005 US_{338}	—	October 31, 2005	Kitt Peak	Spacewatch	EOS	1.3 km	MPC · JPL
481189	2005 UP_{347}	—	October 22, 2005	Kitt Peak	Spacewatch	·	2.1 km	MPC · JPL
481190	2005 UU_{353}	—	October 29, 2005	Catalina	CSS	·	970 m	MPC · JPL
481191	2005 UA_{374}	—	October 27, 2005	Kitt Peak	Spacewatch	TIR	2.5 km	MPC · JPL
481192	2005 UB_{399}	—	October 1, 2005	Mount Lemmon	Mount Lemmon Survey	·	2.8 km	MPC · JPL
481193	2005 UW_{402}	—	October 28, 2005	Kitt Peak	Spacewatch	NYS	830 m	MPC · JPL
481194	2005 UT_{424}	—	October 28, 2005	Kitt Peak	Spacewatch	·	780 m	MPC · JPL
481195	2005 UL_{447}	—	October 29, 2005	Catalina	CSS	·	2.5 km	MPC · JPL
481196	2005 UX_{460}	—	October 28, 2005	Mount Lemmon	Mount Lemmon Survey	HYG	1.9 km	MPC · JPL
481197	2005 UD_{461}	—	October 28, 2005	Mount Lemmon	Mount Lemmon Survey	NYS	1.0 km	MPC · JPL
481198	2005 UW_{471}	—	October 30, 2005	Kitt Peak	Spacewatch	NYS	720 m	MPC · JPL
481199	2005 UE_{474}	—	October 31, 2005	Mount Lemmon	Mount Lemmon Survey	THM	1.6 km	MPC · JPL
481200	2005 UC_{480}	—	July 30, 2005	Siding Spring	SSS	·	1.1 km	MPC · JPL

== 481201–481300 ==
back to top

Designation			Discovery			Properties		Ref
Permanent	Provisional	Named after	Date	Site	Discoverer(s)	Category	Diam.	Ref
481201	2005 UA_{483}	—	October 22, 2005	Catalina	CSS	NYS	970 m	MPC · JPL
481202	2005 US_{487}	—	October 23, 2005	Catalina	CSS	·	850 m	MPC · JPL
481203	2005 UB_{490}	—	September 30, 2005	Mount Lemmon	Mount Lemmon Survey	PHO	950 m	MPC · JPL
481204	2005 UG_{515}	—	October 22, 2005	Apache Point	A. C. Becker	·	3.9 km	MPC · JPL
481205	2005 UH_{517}	—	October 25, 2005	Apache Point	A. C. Becker	EOS	1.5 km	MPC · JPL
481206	2005 UE_{527}	—	October 28, 2005	Kitt Peak	Spacewatch	·	850 m	MPC · JPL
481207	2005 UC_{529}	—	October 22, 2005	Kitt Peak	Spacewatch	NYS	890 m	MPC · JPL
481208	2005 VY	—	October 30, 2005	Socorro	LINEAR	H	530 m	MPC · JPL
481209	2005 VH_{3}	—	October 1, 2005	Kitt Peak	Spacewatch	·	890 m	MPC · JPL
481210	2005 VA_{32}	—	October 25, 2005	Mount Lemmon	Mount Lemmon Survey	·	1.2 km	MPC · JPL
481211	2005 VK_{32}	—	October 1, 2005	Mount Lemmon	Mount Lemmon Survey	THM	1.8 km	MPC · JPL
481212	2005 VZ_{32}	—	November 4, 2005	Kitt Peak	Spacewatch	EOS	2.3 km	MPC · JPL
481213	2005 VB_{36}	—	November 3, 2005	Socorro	LINEAR	·	2.5 km	MPC · JPL
481214	2005 VP_{37}	—	October 28, 2005	Catalina	CSS	·	2.6 km	MPC · JPL
481215	2005 VC_{40}	—	April 21, 2004	Kitt Peak	Spacewatch	·	1.3 km	MPC · JPL
481216	2005 VK_{41}	—	November 4, 2005	Mount Lemmon	Mount Lemmon Survey	·	1.0 km	MPC · JPL
481217	2005 VP_{45}	—	October 25, 2005	Kitt Peak	Spacewatch	·	970 m	MPC · JPL
481218	2005 VY_{49}	—	November 2, 2005	Mount Lemmon	Mount Lemmon Survey	·	990 m	MPC · JPL
481219	2005 VA_{50}	—	November 2, 2005	Mount Lemmon	Mount Lemmon Survey	·	2.5 km	MPC · JPL
481220	2005 VR_{80}	—	November 5, 2005	Catalina	CSS	·	2.3 km	MPC · JPL
481221	2005 VE_{96}	—	October 27, 2005	Kitt Peak	Spacewatch	·	890 m	MPC · JPL
481222	2005 VS_{103}	—	November 2, 2005	Mount Lemmon	Mount Lemmon Survey	·	830 m	MPC · JPL
481223	2005 WK_{5}	—	November 20, 2005	Palomar	NEAT	·	3.0 km	MPC · JPL
481224	2005 WV_{15}	—	November 22, 2005	Kitt Peak	Spacewatch	TIR	2.6 km	MPC · JPL
481225	2005 WR_{24}	—	November 21, 2005	Kitt Peak	Spacewatch	·	2.7 km	MPC · JPL
481226	2005 WU_{24}	—	November 21, 2005	Kitt Peak	Spacewatch	·	850 m	MPC · JPL
481227	2005 WP_{29}	—	November 21, 2005	Kitt Peak	Spacewatch	·	4.6 km	MPC · JPL
481228	2005 WT_{29}	—	November 6, 2005	Mount Lemmon	Mount Lemmon Survey	·	2.4 km	MPC · JPL
481229	2005 WN_{40}	—	November 25, 2005	Mount Lemmon	Mount Lemmon Survey	EMA	2.6 km	MPC · JPL
481230	2005 WP_{48}	—	November 25, 2005	Kitt Peak	Spacewatch	·	930 m	MPC · JPL
481231	2005 WN_{55}	—	November 28, 2005	Junk Bond	D. Healy	·	3.3 km	MPC · JPL
481232	2005 WN_{67}	—	November 22, 2005	Kitt Peak	Spacewatch	·	890 m	MPC · JPL
481233	2005 WJ_{80}	—	November 25, 2005	Mount Lemmon	Mount Lemmon Survey	·	2.0 km	MPC · JPL
481234	2005 WS_{86}	—	November 5, 2005	Kitt Peak	Spacewatch	·	1.2 km	MPC · JPL
481235	2005 WU_{86}	—	November 28, 2005	Mount Lemmon	Mount Lemmon Survey	·	910 m	MPC · JPL
481236	2005 WN_{91}	—	November 28, 2005	Mount Lemmon	Mount Lemmon Survey	·	3.5 km	MPC · JPL
481237	2005 WM_{105}	—	November 29, 2005	Socorro	LINEAR	NYS	990 m	MPC · JPL
481238	2005 WG_{108}	—	November 28, 2005	Catalina	CSS	H	730 m	MPC · JPL
481239	2005 WS_{110}	—	October 29, 2005	Mount Lemmon	Mount Lemmon Survey	·	2.8 km	MPC · JPL
481240	2005 WT_{120}	—	September 14, 2005	Catalina	CSS	H	450 m	MPC · JPL
481241	2005 WD_{130}	—	October 26, 2005	Kitt Peak	Spacewatch	THM	1.9 km	MPC · JPL
481242	2005 WM_{135}	—	November 25, 2005	Mount Lemmon	Mount Lemmon Survey	·	2.8 km	MPC · JPL
481243	2005 WW_{140}	—	November 26, 2005	Mount Lemmon	Mount Lemmon Survey	·	1.5 km	MPC · JPL
481244	2005 WZ_{144}	—	November 25, 2005	Kitt Peak	Spacewatch	·	800 m	MPC · JPL
481245	2005 WD_{146}	—	November 25, 2005	Kitt Peak	Spacewatch	·	730 m	MPC · JPL
481246	2005 WJ_{146}	—	November 25, 2005	Kitt Peak	Spacewatch	ELF	2.7 km	MPC · JPL
481247	2005 WB_{150}	—	November 28, 2005	Kitt Peak	Spacewatch	·	1.2 km	MPC · JPL
481248	2005 WR_{153}	—	October 25, 2005	Catalina	CSS	·	2.5 km	MPC · JPL
481249	2005 WP_{154}	—	November 29, 2005	Kitt Peak	Spacewatch	LIX	2.5 km	MPC · JPL
481250	2005 WA_{155}	—	November 25, 2005	Kitt Peak	Spacewatch	V	700 m	MPC · JPL
481251	2005 WX_{160}	—	November 6, 2005	Mount Lemmon	Mount Lemmon Survey	·	3.2 km	MPC · JPL
481252	2005 WW_{168}	—	November 30, 2005	Kitt Peak	Spacewatch	·	830 m	MPC · JPL
481253	2005 WY_{172}	—	November 6, 2005	Kitt Peak	Spacewatch	·	890 m	MPC · JPL
481254	2005 WO_{180}	—	October 8, 2005	Catalina	CSS	H	640 m	MPC · JPL
481255	2005 WL_{181}	—	November 25, 2005	Catalina	CSS	·	2.9 km	MPC · JPL
481256	2005 WK_{184}	—	November 28, 2005	Catalina	CSS	·	2.9 km	MPC · JPL
481257	2005 WV_{203}	—	November 25, 2005	Catalina	CSS	·	3.8 km	MPC · JPL
481258	2005 WR_{205}	—	November 30, 2005	Mount Lemmon	Mount Lemmon Survey	·	1.7 km	MPC · JPL
481259	2005 XM_{6}	—	November 28, 2005	Socorro	LINEAR	·	1.0 km	MPC · JPL
481260	2005 XD_{36}	—	December 4, 2005	Kitt Peak	Spacewatch	NYS	820 m	MPC · JPL
481261	2005 XB_{43}	—	December 2, 2005	Kitt Peak	Spacewatch	NYS	900 m	MPC · JPL
481262	2005 XR_{52}	—	December 2, 2005	Kitt Peak	Spacewatch	·	1.1 km	MPC · JPL
481263	2005 XH_{62}	—	November 28, 2005	Socorro	LINEAR	·	2.7 km	MPC · JPL
481264	2005 XO_{62}	—	December 5, 2005	Mount Lemmon	Mount Lemmon Survey	NYS	850 m	MPC · JPL
481265	2005 XV_{72}	—	December 6, 2005	Kitt Peak	Spacewatch	·	1.2 km	MPC · JPL
481266	2005 XU_{73}	—	December 6, 2005	Kitt Peak	Spacewatch	·	2.4 km	MPC · JPL
481267	2005 XG_{81}	—	December 7, 2005	Kitt Peak	Spacewatch	·	3.6 km	MPC · JPL
481268	2005 XQ_{82}	—	December 10, 2005	Kitt Peak	Spacewatch	VER	2.5 km	MPC · JPL
481269	2005 XG_{92}	—	October 12, 2005	Kitt Peak	Spacewatch	T_{j} (2.97)	4.0 km	MPC · JPL
481270	2005 YF_{5}	—	November 29, 2005	Kitt Peak	Spacewatch	EOS	1.7 km	MPC · JPL
481271	2005 YR_{5}	—	November 26, 2005	Kitt Peak	Spacewatch	·	2.1 km	MPC · JPL
481272	2005 YC_{18}	—	December 23, 2005	Kitt Peak	Spacewatch	NYS	830 m	MPC · JPL
481273	2005 YL_{18}	—	December 23, 2005	Kitt Peak	Spacewatch	·	1.8 km	MPC · JPL
481274	2005 YN_{19}	—	September 7, 2004	Kitt Peak	Spacewatch	HYG	2.5 km	MPC · JPL
481275	2005 YA_{26}	—	December 24, 2005	Kitt Peak	Spacewatch	·	4.2 km	MPC · JPL
481276	2005 YH_{29}	—	December 24, 2005	Kitt Peak	Spacewatch	THM	1.8 km	MPC · JPL
481277	2005 YA_{33}	—	December 22, 2005	Kitt Peak	Spacewatch	NYS	1.0 km	MPC · JPL
481278	2005 YD_{42}	—	December 22, 2005	Kitt Peak	Spacewatch	·	3.0 km	MPC · JPL
481279	2005 YR_{45}	—	December 25, 2005	Kitt Peak	Spacewatch	·	3.4 km	MPC · JPL
481280	2005 YA_{46}	—	December 25, 2005	Kitt Peak	Spacewatch	·	3.4 km	MPC · JPL
481281	2005 YK_{47}	—	December 10, 2005	Socorro	LINEAR	T_{j} (2.99)	4.0 km	MPC · JPL
481282	2005 YE_{49}	—	December 22, 2005	Kitt Peak	Spacewatch	·	2.8 km	MPC · JPL
481283	2005 YP_{63}	—	December 2, 2005	Mount Lemmon	Mount Lemmon Survey	NYS	990 m	MPC · JPL
481284	2005 YB_{65}	—	December 25, 2005	Kitt Peak	Spacewatch	H	560 m	MPC · JPL
481285	2005 YM_{79}	—	December 24, 2005	Kitt Peak	Spacewatch	·	1.4 km	MPC · JPL
481286	2005 YQ_{81}	—	December 24, 2005	Kitt Peak	Spacewatch	·	850 m	MPC · JPL
481287	2005 YB_{86}	—	December 2, 2005	Mount Lemmon	Mount Lemmon Survey	EOS	2.0 km	MPC · JPL
481288	2005 YN_{86}	—	December 25, 2005	Mount Lemmon	Mount Lemmon Survey	·	3.4 km	MPC · JPL
481289	2005 YX_{88}	—	December 25, 2005	Mount Lemmon	Mount Lemmon Survey	NYS	960 m	MPC · JPL
481290	2005 YF_{91}	—	December 26, 2005	Mount Lemmon	Mount Lemmon Survey	·	1.1 km	MPC · JPL
481291	2005 YL_{104}	—	December 25, 2005	Kitt Peak	Spacewatch	·	1.1 km	MPC · JPL
481292	2005 YK_{120}	—	December 27, 2005	Socorro	LINEAR	·	2.6 km	MPC · JPL
481293	2005 YT_{132}	—	December 26, 2005	Kitt Peak	Spacewatch	·	3.2 km	MPC · JPL
481294	2005 YR_{149}	—	December 25, 2005	Kitt Peak	Spacewatch	·	3.5 km	MPC · JPL
481295	2005 YO_{153}	—	December 29, 2005	Catalina	CSS	PHO	1.1 km	MPC · JPL
481296	2005 YP_{167}	—	December 27, 2005	Kitt Peak	Spacewatch	·	3.7 km	MPC · JPL
481297	2005 YM_{201}	—	December 24, 2005	Kitt Peak	Spacewatch	TIR	3.4 km	MPC · JPL
481298	2005 YG_{203}	—	November 30, 2005	Mount Lemmon	Mount Lemmon Survey	·	2.7 km	MPC · JPL
481299	2005 YM_{214}	—	December 30, 2005	Catalina	CSS	·	2.6 km	MPC · JPL
481300	2005 YC_{218}	—	November 21, 2005	Kitt Peak	Spacewatch	·	3.2 km	MPC · JPL

== 481301–481400 ==
back to top

Designation			Discovery			Properties		Ref
Permanent	Provisional	Named after	Date	Site	Discoverer(s)	Category	Diam.	Ref
481301	2005 YM_{218}	—	December 30, 2005	Mount Lemmon	Mount Lemmon Survey	LIX	2.9 km	MPC · JPL
481302	2005 YY_{218}	—	December 7, 2005	Kitt Peak	Spacewatch	·	3.7 km	MPC · JPL
481303	2005 YD_{222}	—	December 2, 2005	Kitt Peak	Spacewatch	·	2.8 km	MPC · JPL
481304	2005 YA_{223}	—	December 23, 2005	Kitt Peak	Spacewatch	·	3.4 km	MPC · JPL
481305	2005 YB_{223}	—	November 4, 2005	Kitt Peak	Spacewatch	·	2.6 km	MPC · JPL
481306	2005 YX_{227}	—	December 25, 2005	Mount Lemmon	Mount Lemmon Survey	·	2.7 km	MPC · JPL
481307	2005 YW_{246}	—	December 30, 2005	Mount Lemmon	Mount Lemmon Survey	·	2.5 km	MPC · JPL
481308	2005 YA_{248}	—	December 31, 2005	Kitt Peak	Spacewatch	·	3.1 km	MPC · JPL
481309	2005 YS_{269}	—	December 26, 2005	Mount Lemmon	Mount Lemmon Survey	·	3.6 km	MPC · JPL
481310	2005 YE_{273}	—	December 30, 2005	Kitt Peak	Spacewatch	·	3.2 km	MPC · JPL
481311	2006 AN_{5}	—	January 2, 2006	Catalina	CSS	·	4.0 km	MPC · JPL
481312	2006 AQ_{14}	—	January 5, 2006	Mount Lemmon	Mount Lemmon Survey	·	2.8 km	MPC · JPL
481313	2006 AY_{16}	—	January 5, 2006	Kitt Peak	Spacewatch	·	1.1 km	MPC · JPL
481314	2006 AG_{17}	—	January 5, 2006	Kitt Peak	Spacewatch	·	2.1 km	MPC · JPL
481315	2006 AU_{23}	—	January 4, 2006	Mount Lemmon	Mount Lemmon Survey	·	1.4 km	MPC · JPL
481316	2006 AR_{30}	—	January 4, 2006	Kitt Peak	Spacewatch	·	3.0 km	MPC · JPL
481317	2006 AV_{34}	—	January 4, 2006	Kitt Peak	Spacewatch	·	1.2 km	MPC · JPL
481318	2006 AB_{68}	—	January 5, 2006	Mount Lemmon	Mount Lemmon Survey	·	1.7 km	MPC · JPL
481319	2006 AG_{74}	—	January 5, 2006	Catalina	CSS	·	3.8 km	MPC · JPL
481320	2006 AU_{85}	—	January 10, 2006	Catalina	CSS	PHO	1.1 km	MPC · JPL
481321	2006 AF_{86}	—	January 5, 2006	Catalina	CSS	H	620 m	MPC · JPL
481322	2006 BT	—	January 19, 2006	Gnosca	S. Sposetti	·	1.0 km	MPC · JPL
481323	2006 BX_{10}	—	January 20, 2006	Kitt Peak	Spacewatch	·	1.5 km	MPC · JPL
481324	2006 BO_{14}	—	December 22, 2005	Kitt Peak	Spacewatch	·	2.4 km	MPC · JPL
481325	2006 BD_{25}	—	January 10, 2006	Mount Lemmon	Mount Lemmon Survey	NYS	770 m	MPC · JPL
481326	2006 BC_{26}	—	January 22, 2006	Anderson Mesa	LONEOS	·	3.0 km	MPC · JPL
481327	2006 BB_{27}	—	January 23, 2006	Kitt Peak	Spacewatch	AMO · PHA	220 m	MPC · JPL
481328	2006 BS_{35}	—	January 23, 2006	Mount Lemmon	Mount Lemmon Survey	·	3.0 km	MPC · JPL
481329	2006 BT_{48}	—	January 25, 2006	Kitt Peak	Spacewatch	·	960 m	MPC · JPL
481330	2006 BY_{51}	—	January 25, 2006	Kitt Peak	Spacewatch	·	860 m	MPC · JPL
481331	2006 BK_{58}	—	January 23, 2006	Kitt Peak	Spacewatch	·	2.8 km	MPC · JPL
481332	2006 BJ_{76}	—	January 23, 2006	Kitt Peak	Spacewatch	·	3.3 km	MPC · JPL
481333	2006 BV_{88}	—	January 25, 2006	Kitt Peak	Spacewatch	·	2.4 km	MPC · JPL
481334	2006 BX_{92}	—	January 26, 2006	Kitt Peak	Spacewatch	·	2.7 km	MPC · JPL
481335	2006 BH_{114}	—	January 7, 2006	Mount Lemmon	Mount Lemmon Survey	·	910 m	MPC · JPL
481336	2006 BN_{153}	—	January 7, 2006	Mount Lemmon	Mount Lemmon Survey	·	2.1 km	MPC · JPL
481337	2006 BG_{190}	—	January 28, 2006	Kitt Peak	Spacewatch	NYS	950 m	MPC · JPL
481338	2006 BH_{218}	—	January 27, 2006	Mount Lemmon	Mount Lemmon Survey	·	3.2 km	MPC · JPL
481339	2006 BM_{223}	—	January 30, 2006	Kitt Peak	Spacewatch	NYS	950 m	MPC · JPL
481340	2006 BK_{240}	—	January 31, 2006	Kitt Peak	Spacewatch	L5	10 km	MPC · JPL
481341	2006 BA_{242}	—	January 31, 2006	Kitt Peak	Spacewatch	·	1.5 km	MPC · JPL
481342	2006 BL_{265}	—	January 31, 2006	Kitt Peak	Spacewatch	NYS	1.0 km	MPC · JPL
481343	2006 BM_{265}	—	January 6, 2006	Mount Lemmon	Mount Lemmon Survey	·	2.7 km	MPC · JPL
481344	2006 CM_{13}	—	February 1, 2006	Kitt Peak	Spacewatch	·	1.2 km	MPC · JPL
481345	2006 CE_{19}	—	January 6, 2006	Mount Lemmon	Mount Lemmon Survey	·	2.7 km	MPC · JPL
481346	2006 CQ_{24}	—	January 10, 2006	Mount Lemmon	Mount Lemmon Survey	·	880 m	MPC · JPL
481347	2006 CM_{58}	—	February 5, 2006	Mount Lemmon	Mount Lemmon Survey	MAS	680 m	MPC · JPL
481348	2006 DN_{44}	—	February 1, 2006	Mount Lemmon	Mount Lemmon Survey	·	2.6 km	MPC · JPL
481349	2006 DV_{47}	—	February 21, 2006	Mount Lemmon	Mount Lemmon Survey	·	930 m	MPC · JPL
481350	2006 DK_{48}	—	January 30, 2006	Kitt Peak	Spacewatch	VER	2.1 km	MPC · JPL
481351	2006 DG_{62}	—	February 22, 2006	Anderson Mesa	LONEOS	·	1.5 km	MPC · JPL
481352	2006 DP_{65}	—	January 28, 2006	Anderson Mesa	LONEOS	·	1.3 km	MPC · JPL
481353	2006 DL_{68}	—	January 23, 2006	Kitt Peak	Spacewatch	ELF	3.1 km	MPC · JPL
481354	2006 DS_{78}	—	February 24, 2006	Kitt Peak	Spacewatch	NYS	980 m	MPC · JPL
481355	2006 DR_{90}	—	February 24, 2006	Kitt Peak	Spacewatch	·	730 m	MPC · JPL
481356	2006 DH_{205}	—	February 25, 2006	Kitt Peak	Spacewatch	·	990 m	MPC · JPL
481357	2006 EY_{22}	—	March 3, 2006	Kitt Peak	Spacewatch	NYS	1.1 km	MPC · JPL
481358	2006 ES_{69}	—	March 9, 2006	Catalina	CSS	·	1.7 km	MPC · JPL
481359	2006 FO_{9}	—	March 6, 2006	Catalina	CSS	·	4.9 km	MPC · JPL
481360	2006 FM_{25}	—	March 24, 2006	Kitt Peak	Spacewatch	·	1.7 km	MPC · JPL
481361	2006 FH_{41}	—	March 26, 2006	Mount Lemmon	Mount Lemmon Survey	·	1.1 km	MPC · JPL
481362	2006 FT_{50}	—	March 26, 2006	Siding Spring	SSS	·	3.6 km	MPC · JPL
481363	2006 GS_{49}	—	February 1, 2006	Catalina	CSS	T_{j} (2.94)	2.2 km	MPC · JPL
481364	2006 HN_{19}	—	April 18, 2006	Kitt Peak	Spacewatch	·	1.4 km	MPC · JPL
481365	2006 HJ_{33}	—	April 19, 2006	Mount Lemmon	Mount Lemmon Survey	·	1.3 km	MPC · JPL
481366	2006 HY_{70}	—	April 25, 2006	Kitt Peak	Spacewatch	·	1.6 km	MPC · JPL
481367	2006 HQ_{129}	—	January 23, 2006	Kitt Peak	Spacewatch	NYS	870 m	MPC · JPL
481368	2006 HQ_{132}	—	April 26, 2006	Cerro Tololo	M. W. Buie	·	2.4 km	MPC · JPL
481369	2006 HN_{142}	—	April 27, 2006	Cerro Tololo	M. W. Buie	·	1.2 km	MPC · JPL
481370	2006 JD_{20}	—	May 2, 2006	Kitt Peak	Spacewatch	·	1.8 km	MPC · JPL
481371	2006 JY_{49}	—	May 2, 2006	Mount Lemmon	Mount Lemmon Survey	·	1.1 km	MPC · JPL
481372	2006 KP_{5}	—	April 25, 2006	Mount Lemmon	Mount Lemmon Survey	·	1.3 km	MPC · JPL
481373	2006 KJ_{12}	—	May 20, 2006	Kitt Peak	Spacewatch	·	2.0 km	MPC · JPL
481374	2006 KD_{24}	—	May 19, 2006	Mount Lemmon	Mount Lemmon Survey	·	1.8 km	MPC · JPL
481375	2006 KG_{33}	—	May 20, 2006	Kitt Peak	Spacewatch	JUN	1.1 km	MPC · JPL
481376	2006 KO_{48}	—	May 21, 2006	Kitt Peak	Spacewatch	·	1.5 km	MPC · JPL
481377	2006 KS_{54}	—	May 21, 2006	Kitt Peak	Spacewatch	·	1.8 km	MPC · JPL
481378	2006 KD_{87}	—	May 21, 2006	Kitt Peak	Spacewatch	·	1.1 km	MPC · JPL
481379	2006 KE_{102}	—	May 27, 2006	Kitt Peak	Spacewatch	·	1.4 km	MPC · JPL
481380	2006 MP_{8}	—	June 19, 2006	Mount Lemmon	Mount Lemmon Survey	·	2.9 km	MPC · JPL
481381	2006 OS_{5}	—	July 22, 2006	Palomar	NEAT	T_{j} (2.89) · AMO	740 m	MPC · JPL
481382	2006 PM_{19}	—	June 20, 2006	Mount Lemmon	Mount Lemmon Survey	·	2.0 km	MPC · JPL
481383	2006 PX_{26}	—	August 15, 2006	Palomar	NEAT	·	2.6 km	MPC · JPL
481384	2006 QZ_{29}	—	July 21, 2006	Catalina	CSS	·	1.9 km	MPC · JPL
481385	2006 QG_{43}	—	August 18, 2006	Kitt Peak	Spacewatch	·	680 m	MPC · JPL
481386	2006 QM_{65}	—	August 27, 2006	Kitt Peak	Spacewatch	·	1.8 km	MPC · JPL
481387	2006 QD_{89}	—	August 18, 2006	Kitt Peak	Spacewatch	·	600 m	MPC · JPL
481388	2006 RD_{1}	—	September 6, 2006	Wrightwood	J. W. Young	·	1.2 km	MPC · JPL
481389	2006 RX_{38}	—	September 14, 2006	Catalina	CSS	·	1.5 km	MPC · JPL
481390	2006 RV_{64}	—	September 14, 2006	Kitt Peak	Spacewatch	·	1.4 km	MPC · JPL
481391	2006 RE_{78}	—	September 15, 2006	Kitt Peak	Spacewatch	·	1.3 km	MPC · JPL
481392	2006 RG_{90}	—	September 15, 2006	Kitt Peak	Spacewatch	·	550 m	MPC · JPL
481393	2006 RO_{122}	—	September 15, 2006	Kitt Peak	Spacewatch	AST	1.5 km	MPC · JPL
481394	2006 SF_{6}	—	September 17, 2006	Catalina	CSS	ATE · PHA	360 m	MPC · JPL
481395	2006 SP_{38}	—	September 18, 2006	Kitt Peak	Spacewatch	·	1.5 km	MPC · JPL
481396	2006 SB_{59}	—	August 29, 2006	Anderson Mesa	LONEOS	·	2.5 km	MPC · JPL
481397	2006 SS_{59}	—	September 17, 2006	Catalina	CSS	·	2.0 km	MPC · JPL
481398	2006 SP_{61}	—	September 16, 2006	Catalina	CSS	·	1.3 km	MPC · JPL
481399	2006 SA_{80}	—	September 18, 2006	Kitt Peak	Spacewatch	H	340 m	MPC · JPL
481400	2006 SC_{115}	—	September 15, 2006	Kitt Peak	Spacewatch	·	1.8 km	MPC · JPL

== 481401–481500 ==
back to top

Designation			Discovery			Properties		Ref
Permanent	Provisional	Named after	Date	Site	Discoverer(s)	Category	Diam.	Ref
481401	2006 SY_{154}	—	September 14, 2006	Kitt Peak	Spacewatch	·	1.7 km	MPC · JPL
481402	2006 SJ_{185}	—	September 25, 2006	Kitt Peak	Spacewatch	·	470 m	MPC · JPL
481403	2006 SU_{200}	—	September 18, 2006	Kitt Peak	Spacewatch	·	1.6 km	MPC · JPL
481404	2006 SO_{241}	—	August 28, 2006	Kitt Peak	Spacewatch	DOR	1.6 km	MPC · JPL
481405	2006 SB_{275}	—	September 19, 2006	Kitt Peak	Spacewatch	·	570 m	MPC · JPL
481406	2006 SJ_{291}	—	September 16, 2006	Siding Spring	SSS	·	2.8 km	MPC · JPL
481407	2006 SS_{297}	—	September 17, 2006	Kitt Peak	Spacewatch	·	1.3 km	MPC · JPL
481408	2006 SL_{323}	—	September 17, 2006	Kitt Peak	Spacewatch	·	1.6 km	MPC · JPL
481409	2006 SV_{396}	—	September 18, 2006	Kitt Peak	Spacewatch	·	1.7 km	MPC · JPL
481410	2006 SG_{405}	—	September 27, 2006	Mount Lemmon	Mount Lemmon Survey	·	2.1 km	MPC · JPL
481411	2006 TJ_{8}	—	October 4, 2006	Mount Lemmon	Mount Lemmon Survey	·	700 m	MPC · JPL
481412	2006 TL_{11}	—	September 27, 2006	Mount Lemmon	Mount Lemmon Survey	·	750 m	MPC · JPL
481413	2006 TX_{53}	—	October 12, 2006	Kitt Peak	Spacewatch	·	720 m	MPC · JPL
481414	2006 TK_{82}	—	October 13, 2006	Kitt Peak	Spacewatch	·	1.7 km	MPC · JPL
481415	2006 TW_{98}	—	October 15, 2006	Kitt Peak	Spacewatch	·	2.3 km	MPC · JPL
481416	2006 TS_{115}	—	October 1, 2006	Apache Point	A. C. Becker	·	1.4 km	MPC · JPL
481417	2006 UX_{23}	—	September 25, 2006	Kitt Peak	Spacewatch	·	510 m	MPC · JPL
481418	2006 UM_{49}	—	October 17, 2006	Catalina	CSS	·	610 m	MPC · JPL
481419	2006 UJ_{54}	—	September 20, 2006	Anderson Mesa	LONEOS	·	570 m	MPC · JPL
481420	2006 UH_{60}	—	October 19, 2006	Mount Lemmon	Mount Lemmon Survey	·	1.6 km	MPC · JPL
481421	2006 UX_{94}	—	October 3, 2006	Mount Lemmon	Mount Lemmon Survey	·	1.5 km	MPC · JPL
481422	2006 UK_{96}	—	September 27, 2006	Mount Lemmon	Mount Lemmon Survey	·	600 m	MPC · JPL
481423	2006 UC_{101}	—	October 3, 2006	Mount Lemmon	Mount Lemmon Survey	AGN	1.1 km	MPC · JPL
481424	2006 UA_{129}	—	September 28, 2006	Mount Lemmon	Mount Lemmon Survey	KOR	1.0 km	MPC · JPL
481425	2006 UB_{130}	—	October 19, 2006	Kitt Peak	Spacewatch	KOR	1.2 km	MPC · JPL
481426	2006 UU_{132}	—	October 19, 2006	Kitt Peak	Spacewatch	·	630 m	MPC · JPL
481427	2006 UG_{142}	—	October 19, 2006	Kitt Peak	Spacewatch	·	510 m	MPC · JPL
481428	2006 UQ_{147}	—	September 26, 2006	Kitt Peak	Spacewatch	·	620 m	MPC · JPL
481429	2006 UF_{164}	—	October 21, 2006	Mount Lemmon	Mount Lemmon Survey	·	1.6 km	MPC · JPL
481430	2006 UR_{164}	—	October 21, 2006	Mount Lemmon	Mount Lemmon Survey	BRA	1.1 km	MPC · JPL
481431	2006 UR_{185}	—	October 16, 2006	Catalina	CSS	·	690 m	MPC · JPL
481432	2006 UD_{191}	—	October 19, 2006	Catalina	CSS	·	2.0 km	MPC · JPL
481433	2006 UF_{272}	—	September 27, 2006	Mount Lemmon	Mount Lemmon Survey	EOS	2.0 km	MPC · JPL
481434	2006 UE_{328}	—	October 16, 2006	Kitt Peak	Spacewatch	·	2.0 km	MPC · JPL
481435	2006 VN_{7}	—	September 30, 2006	Mount Lemmon	Mount Lemmon Survey	(883)	630 m	MPC · JPL
481436	2006 VW_{17}	—	November 9, 2006	Kitt Peak	Spacewatch	·	630 m	MPC · JPL
481437	2006 VA_{38}	—	November 1, 2006	Kitt Peak	Spacewatch	·	1.9 km	MPC · JPL
481438	2006 VL_{64}	—	November 11, 2006	Kitt Peak	Spacewatch	·	610 m	MPC · JPL
481439	2006 VU_{67}	—	September 28, 2006	Mount Lemmon	Mount Lemmon Survey	·	610 m	MPC · JPL
481440	2006 VX_{72}	—	November 11, 2006	Mount Lemmon	Mount Lemmon Survey	·	760 m	MPC · JPL
481441	2006 VZ_{136}	—	November 15, 2006	Kitt Peak	Spacewatch	·	480 m	MPC · JPL
481442	2006 WO_{3}	—	November 20, 2006	Catalina	CSS	ATE	170 m	MPC · JPL
481443	2006 WA_{7}	—	November 16, 2006	Kitt Peak	Spacewatch	·	1.6 km	MPC · JPL
481444	2006 WV_{145}	—	November 20, 2006	Kitt Peak	Spacewatch	·	2.1 km	MPC · JPL
481445	2006 WV_{147}	—	November 20, 2006	Kitt Peak	Spacewatch	·	590 m	MPC · JPL
481446	2006 WH_{162}	—	October 21, 2006	Mount Lemmon	Mount Lemmon Survey	·	2.0 km	MPC · JPL
481447	2006 WR_{166}	—	November 23, 2006	Kitt Peak	Spacewatch	·	520 m	MPC · JPL
481448	2006 WQ_{172}	—	November 23, 2006	Kitt Peak	Spacewatch	·	990 m	MPC · JPL
481449	2006 WV_{173}	—	November 23, 2006	Kitt Peak	Spacewatch	·	520 m	MPC · JPL
481450	2006 WT_{188}	—	November 16, 2006	Kitt Peak	Spacewatch	·	570 m	MPC · JPL
481451	2006 WV_{199}	—	November 16, 2006	Mount Lemmon	Mount Lemmon Survey	·	2.2 km	MPC · JPL
481452	2006 WE_{200}	—	November 17, 2006	Mount Lemmon	Mount Lemmon Survey	·	470 m	MPC · JPL
481453	2006 WK_{201}	—	November 21, 2006	Mount Lemmon	Mount Lemmon Survey	EOS	1.5 km	MPC · JPL
481454	2006 WL_{204}	—	November 22, 2006	Mount Lemmon	Mount Lemmon Survey	·	800 m	MPC · JPL
481455	2006 WX_{204}	—	November 17, 2006	Kitt Peak	Spacewatch	·	2.1 km	MPC · JPL
481456	2006 WV_{205}	—	November 27, 2006	Kitt Peak	Spacewatch	·	1.3 km	MPC · JPL
481457	2006 XD_{2}	—	December 12, 2006	Socorro	LINEAR	APO · PHA	210 m	MPC · JPL
481458	2006 XT_{27}	—	December 13, 2006	Socorro	LINEAR	H	590 m	MPC · JPL
481459	2006 XN_{38}	—	November 22, 2006	Mount Lemmon	Mount Lemmon Survey	·	790 m	MPC · JPL
481460	2006 XF_{41}	—	March 26, 2004	Socorro	LINEAR	·	770 m	MPC · JPL
481461	2006 XV_{55}	—	October 23, 2006	Mount Lemmon	Mount Lemmon Survey	AEG	3.2 km	MPC · JPL
481462	2006 XO_{65}	—	December 12, 2006	Catalina	CSS	PHO	1.9 km	MPC · JPL
481463	2006 XJ_{72}	—	December 13, 2006	Kitt Peak	Spacewatch	(1338) (FLO)	640 m	MPC · JPL
481464	2006 YA_{6}	—	November 25, 2006	Kitt Peak	Spacewatch	·	3.3 km	MPC · JPL
481465	2006 YB_{35}	—	November 25, 2006	Mount Lemmon	Mount Lemmon Survey	·	2.4 km	MPC · JPL
481466	2006 YQ_{38}	—	December 21, 2006	Kitt Peak	Spacewatch	·	460 m	MPC · JPL
481467	2007 AN_{9}	—	November 27, 2006	Mount Lemmon	Mount Lemmon Survey	·	560 m	MPC · JPL
481468	2007 AE_{14}	—	December 16, 2006	Mount Lemmon	Mount Lemmon Survey	·	2.0 km	MPC · JPL
481469	2007 BT_{10}	—	January 17, 2007	Kitt Peak	Spacewatch	·	2.3 km	MPC · JPL
481470	2007 BA_{29}	—	January 24, 2007	Catalina	CSS	·	610 m	MPC · JPL
481471	2007 BB_{29}	—	January 24, 2007	Mount Nyukasa	Japan Aerospace Exploration Agency	·	600 m	MPC · JPL
481472	2007 BT_{33}	—	October 1, 2005	Mount Lemmon	Mount Lemmon Survey	·	1.7 km	MPC · JPL
481473	2007 BO_{46}	—	January 26, 2007	Kitt Peak	Spacewatch	·	810 m	MPC · JPL
481474	2007 BS_{46}	—	January 26, 2007	Kitt Peak	Spacewatch	·	2.6 km	MPC · JPL
481475	2007 BO_{73}	—	January 17, 2007	Kitt Peak	Spacewatch	H	580 m	MPC · JPL
481476	2007 BN_{76}	—	January 17, 2007	Kitt Peak	Spacewatch	·	1.8 km	MPC · JPL
481477	2007 BX_{79}	—	January 27, 2007	Kitt Peak	Spacewatch	V	580 m	MPC · JPL
481478	2007 BV_{100}	—	January 27, 2007	Mount Lemmon	Mount Lemmon Survey	·	2.2 km	MPC · JPL
481479	2007 CO_{6}	—	December 12, 2006	Mount Lemmon	Mount Lemmon Survey	·	2.2 km	MPC · JPL
481480	2007 CZ_{8}	—	December 21, 2006	Mount Lemmon	Mount Lemmon Survey	·	2.3 km	MPC · JPL
481481	2007 CP_{18}	—	February 8, 2007	Mount Lemmon	Mount Lemmon Survey	NYS	620 m	MPC · JPL
481482	2007 CA_{19}	—	February 10, 2007	Catalina	CSS	T_{j} (2.68) · APO +1km · PHA	1.1 km	MPC · JPL
481483	2007 CQ_{27}	—	January 24, 2007	Mount Lemmon	Mount Lemmon Survey	(5)	1.2 km	MPC · JPL
481484	2007 CT_{37}	—	January 17, 2007	Kitt Peak	Spacewatch	·	1.3 km	MPC · JPL
481485	2007 CV_{37}	—	February 6, 2007	Mount Lemmon	Mount Lemmon Survey	·	730 m	MPC · JPL
481486	2007 CX_{41}	—	January 17, 2007	Catalina	CSS	H	630 m	MPC · JPL
481487	2007 CD_{43}	—	February 8, 2007	Kitt Peak	Spacewatch	·	1.2 km	MPC · JPL
481488	2007 CZ_{53}	—	February 15, 2007	Junk Bond	D. Healy	·	680 m	MPC · JPL
481489	2007 CK_{57}	—	November 22, 2006	Mount Lemmon	Mount Lemmon Survey	·	1.1 km	MPC · JPL
481490	2007 DB	—	February 16, 2007	Cordell-Lorenz	D. T. Durig	LIX	3.3 km	MPC · JPL
481491	2007 DD_{15}	—	February 8, 2007	Kitt Peak	Spacewatch	·	1.0 km	MPC · JPL
481492	2007 DB_{34}	—	February 17, 2007	Kitt Peak	Spacewatch	·	620 m	MPC · JPL
481493	2007 DM_{35}	—	February 17, 2007	Kitt Peak	Spacewatch	·	2.4 km	MPC · JPL
481494	2007 DG_{47}	—	December 27, 2006	Mount Lemmon	Mount Lemmon Survey	·	3.1 km	MPC · JPL
481495	2007 DP_{47}	—	February 21, 2007	Mount Lemmon	Mount Lemmon Survey	·	3.2 km	MPC · JPL
481496	2007 DV_{62}	—	February 21, 2007	Kitt Peak	Spacewatch	·	690 m	MPC · JPL
481497	2007 DE_{88}	—	November 6, 2005	Kitt Peak	Spacewatch	·	2.0 km	MPC · JPL
481498	2007 DM_{89}	—	January 28, 2007	Kitt Peak	Spacewatch	·	2.4 km	MPC · JPL
481499	2007 DO_{89}	—	February 23, 2007	Mount Lemmon	Mount Lemmon Survey	·	3.4 km	MPC · JPL
481500	2007 DA_{114}	—	February 25, 2007	Mount Lemmon	Mount Lemmon Survey	·	1.6 km	MPC · JPL

== 481501–481600 ==
back to top

Designation			Discovery			Properties		Ref
Permanent	Provisional	Named after	Date	Site	Discoverer(s)	Category	Diam.	Ref
481501	2007 EC_{22}	—	March 10, 2007	Mount Lemmon	Mount Lemmon Survey	·	670 m	MPC · JPL
481502	2007 EJ_{27}	—	March 7, 2007	Mount Lemmon	Mount Lemmon Survey	·	2.3 km	MPC · JPL
481503	2007 ED_{53}	—	February 21, 2007	Kitt Peak	Spacewatch	·	2.4 km	MPC · JPL
481504	2007 EL_{62}	—	November 24, 2006	Mount Lemmon	Mount Lemmon Survey	L5	10 km	MPC · JPL
481505	2007 EN_{64}	—	March 10, 2007	Mount Lemmon	Mount Lemmon Survey	fast	2.3 km	MPC · JPL
481506	2007 ES_{67}	—	February 27, 2007	Kitt Peak	Spacewatch	H	440 m	MPC · JPL
481507	2007 EK_{80}	—	March 10, 2007	Mount Lemmon	Mount Lemmon Survey	·	3.6 km	MPC · JPL
481508	2007 EW_{87}	—	February 22, 2007	Siding Spring	SSS	·	3.5 km	MPC · JPL
481509	2007 EP_{143}	—	March 12, 2007	Kitt Peak	Spacewatch	·	2.7 km	MPC · JPL
481510	2007 ED_{159}	—	March 14, 2007	Kitt Peak	Spacewatch	·	880 m	MPC · JPL
481511	2007 ED_{160}	—	March 14, 2007	Kitt Peak	Spacewatch	·	700 m	MPC · JPL
481512	2007 EP_{172}	—	March 14, 2007	Kitt Peak	Spacewatch	PHO	760 m	MPC · JPL
481513	2007 EM_{202}	—	March 9, 2007	Kitt Peak	Spacewatch	·	2.7 km	MPC · JPL
481514	2007 EL_{212}	—	January 27, 2007	Mount Lemmon	Mount Lemmon Survey	·	1.8 km	MPC · JPL
481515	2007 ES_{216}	—	February 25, 2007	Mount Lemmon	Mount Lemmon Survey	·	720 m	MPC · JPL
481516	2007 FY_{11}	—	February 15, 2007	Catalina	CSS	PHO	1.0 km	MPC · JPL
481517	2007 FA_{34}	—	March 15, 2007	Kitt Peak	Spacewatch	·	3.4 km	MPC · JPL
481518	2007 FW_{39}	—	March 17, 2007	Anderson Mesa	LONEOS	·	3.2 km	MPC · JPL
481519	2007 FY_{44}	—	March 16, 2007	Mount Lemmon	Mount Lemmon Survey	EOS	1.5 km	MPC · JPL
481520	2007 FZ_{44}	—	February 9, 2007	Kitt Peak	Spacewatch	·	3.2 km	MPC · JPL
481521	2007 FV_{48}	—	March 26, 2007	Kitt Peak	Spacewatch	·	3.4 km	MPC · JPL
481522	2007 FS_{49}	—	March 20, 2007	Catalina	CSS	·	3.4 km	MPC · JPL
481523	2007 GF_{45}	—	April 14, 2007	Kitt Peak	Spacewatch	HYG	2.7 km	MPC · JPL
481524	2007 HO_{18}	—	March 26, 2007	Kitt Peak	Spacewatch	·	2.7 km	MPC · JPL
481525	2007 HG_{53}	—	April 20, 2007	Kitt Peak	Spacewatch	·	3.7 km	MPC · JPL
481526	2007 HK_{68}	—	March 16, 2007	Kitt Peak	Spacewatch	·	4.0 km	MPC · JPL
481527	2007 HC_{71}	—	April 20, 2007	Kitt Peak	Spacewatch	·	3.0 km	MPC · JPL
481528	2007 HX_{79}	—	April 24, 2007	Mount Lemmon	Mount Lemmon Survey	·	3.9 km	MPC · JPL
481529	2007 HJ_{82}	—	April 25, 2007	Mount Lemmon	Mount Lemmon Survey	V	760 m	MPC · JPL
481530	2007 HV_{92}	—	April 19, 2007	Catalina	CSS	H	600 m	MPC · JPL
481531	2007 JP_{35}	—	May 8, 2007	Catalina	CSS	T_{j} (2.98)	3.9 km	MPC · JPL
481532	2007 LE	—	June 7, 2007	Socorro	LINEAR	APO · PHA · moon	420 m	MPC · JPL
481533	2007 LH_{4}	—	April 24, 2001	Kitt Peak	Spacewatch	EOS	2.2 km	MPC · JPL
481534	2007 LX_{16}	—	May 25, 2007	Mount Lemmon	Mount Lemmon Survey	·	980 m	MPC · JPL
481535	2007 MY_{19}	—	June 21, 2007	Kitt Peak	Spacewatch	·	1.4 km	MPC · JPL
481536	2007 MH_{24}	—	June 21, 2007	Mount Lemmon	Mount Lemmon Survey	L5	9.5 km	MPC · JPL
481537	2007 NK_{6}	—	July 10, 2007	Siding Spring	SSS	·	1.6 km	MPC · JPL
481538	2007 OP_{4}	—	July 23, 2007	La Sagra	OAM	·	1.5 km	MPC · JPL
481539	2007 PG_{20}	—	June 18, 2007	Catalina	CSS	·	1.7 km	MPC · JPL
481540	2007 PT_{21}	—	August 9, 2007	Socorro	LINEAR	·	1.5 km	MPC · JPL
481541	2007 QF_{8}	—	August 21, 2007	Anderson Mesa	LONEOS	·	1.2 km	MPC · JPL
481542	2007 RF_{5}	—	September 5, 2007	Catalina	CSS	APO	740 m	MPC · JPL
481543	2007 RN_{7}	—	September 5, 2007	Catalina	CSS	AMO	160 m	MPC · JPL
481544	2007 RN_{31}	—	September 5, 2007	Catalina	CSS	·	1.4 km	MPC · JPL
481545	2007 RJ_{84}	—	September 10, 2007	Catalina	CSS	·	1.7 km	MPC · JPL
481546	2007 RU_{134}	—	August 23, 2007	Kitt Peak	Spacewatch	·	1.9 km	MPC · JPL
481547	2007 RW_{145}	—	September 14, 2007	Socorro	LINEAR	·	1.5 km	MPC · JPL
481548	2007 RW_{148}	—	September 12, 2007	Catalina	CSS	·	1.1 km	MPC · JPL
481549	2007 RU_{155}	—	September 10, 2007	Mount Lemmon	Mount Lemmon Survey	MAR	740 m	MPC · JPL
481550	2007 RH_{171}	—	September 10, 2007	Kitt Peak	Spacewatch	·	1.1 km	MPC · JPL
481551	2007 RA_{177}	—	September 10, 2007	Mount Lemmon	Mount Lemmon Survey	·	1.3 km	MPC · JPL
481552	2007 RA_{179}	—	September 10, 2007	Mount Lemmon	Mount Lemmon Survey	ADE	1.9 km	MPC · JPL
481553	2007 RC_{189}	—	September 10, 2007	Catalina	CSS	(1547)	1.8 km	MPC · JPL
481554	2007 RF_{215}	—	September 12, 2007	Kitt Peak	Spacewatch	·	1.3 km	MPC · JPL
481555	2007 RE_{233}	—	September 11, 2007	XuYi	PMO NEO Survey Program	·	1.4 km	MPC · JPL
481556	2007 RH_{239}	—	September 11, 2007	XuYi	PMO NEO Survey Program	T_{j} (2.92)	4.0 km	MPC · JPL
481557	2007 RG_{258}	—	September 14, 2007	Kitt Peak	Spacewatch	·	1.2 km	MPC · JPL
481558	2007 RC_{280}	—	September 10, 2007	Catalina	CSS	EUN	1.4 km	MPC · JPL
481559	2007 RE_{292}	—	September 12, 2007	Mount Lemmon	Mount Lemmon Survey	·	1.3 km	MPC · JPL
481560	2007 RA_{314}	—	September 13, 2007	Catalina	CSS	JUN	1.0 km	MPC · JPL
481561	2007 RK_{316}	—	September 5, 2007	Anderson Mesa	LONEOS	·	1.9 km	MPC · JPL
481562	2007 RU_{324}	—	September 12, 2007	Catalina	CSS	MAR	1 km	MPC · JPL
481563	2007 RV_{324}	—	September 12, 2007	Catalina	CSS	EUN	1.4 km	MPC · JPL
481564	2007 RY_{325}	—	September 14, 2007	Mount Lemmon	Mount Lemmon Survey	GEF	990 m	MPC · JPL
481565	2007 SC	—	September 11, 2007	Catalina	CSS	·	1.7 km	MPC · JPL
481566	2007 SV	—	September 17, 2007	Bisei SG Center	BATTeRS	·	1.6 km	MPC · JPL
481567	2007 SB_{13}	—	September 9, 2007	Kitt Peak	Spacewatch	·	960 m	MPC · JPL
481568	2007 TB_{12}	—	October 8, 2007	Kitt Peak	Spacewatch	·	1.9 km	MPC · JPL
481569	2007 TK_{13}	—	October 6, 2007	Socorro	LINEAR	·	2.1 km	MPC · JPL
481570	2007 TF_{25}	—	September 14, 2007	Mount Lemmon	Mount Lemmon Survey	·	1.1 km	MPC · JPL
481571	2007 TZ_{27}	—	September 14, 2007	Catalina	CSS	T_{j} (2.97) · 3:2	5.6 km	MPC · JPL
481572	2007 TR_{40}	—	October 6, 2007	Kitt Peak	Spacewatch	·	2.4 km	MPC · JPL
481573	2007 TX_{50}	—	May 4, 2006	Mount Lemmon	Mount Lemmon Survey	·	1.6 km	MPC · JPL
481574	2007 TV_{53}	—	October 4, 2007	Kitt Peak	Spacewatch	NEM	1.9 km	MPC · JPL
481575	2007 TS_{74}	—	October 12, 2007	Kitt Peak	Spacewatch	·	1.8 km	MPC · JPL
481576	2007 TV_{93}	—	October 6, 2007	Kitt Peak	Spacewatch	·	1.8 km	MPC · JPL
481577	2007 TN_{103}	—	October 8, 2007	Mount Lemmon	Mount Lemmon Survey	·	2.3 km	MPC · JPL
481578	2007 TM_{111}	—	October 8, 2007	Catalina	CSS	·	1.9 km	MPC · JPL
481579	2007 TS_{114}	—	September 12, 2007	Kitt Peak	Spacewatch	·	1.6 km	MPC · JPL
481580	2007 TR_{130}	—	October 7, 2007	Kitt Peak	Spacewatch	·	1.6 km	MPC · JPL
481581	2007 TA_{132}	—	October 7, 2007	Mount Lemmon	Mount Lemmon Survey	·	1.3 km	MPC · JPL
481582	2007 TP_{132}	—	September 12, 2007	Mount Lemmon	Mount Lemmon Survey	·	1.2 km	MPC · JPL
481583	2007 TF_{137}	—	October 8, 2007	Catalina	CSS	EUN	1.1 km	MPC · JPL
481584	2007 TA_{145}	—	October 4, 2007	Kitt Peak	Spacewatch	·	1.2 km	MPC · JPL
481585	2007 TX_{149}	—	September 11, 2007	Catalina	CSS	·	1.9 km	MPC · JPL
481586	2007 TD_{155}	—	October 9, 2007	Socorro	LINEAR	·	1.8 km	MPC · JPL
481587	2007 TE_{160}	—	September 8, 2007	Catalina	CSS	JUN	1.1 km	MPC · JPL
481588	2007 TN_{164}	—	October 7, 2007	Mount Lemmon	Mount Lemmon Survey	·	1.2 km	MPC · JPL
481589	2007 TT_{165}	—	October 11, 2007	Socorro	LINEAR	·	1.5 km	MPC · JPL
481590	2007 TJ_{169}	—	September 25, 2007	Mount Lemmon	Mount Lemmon Survey	fast	1.7 km	MPC · JPL
481591	2007 TN_{202}	—	October 8, 2007	Mount Lemmon	Mount Lemmon Survey	·	1.7 km	MPC · JPL
481592	2007 TS_{205}	—	October 9, 2007	Mount Lemmon	Mount Lemmon Survey	(5)	960 m	MPC · JPL
481593	2007 TD_{208}	—	September 12, 2007	Catalina	CSS	·	1.7 km	MPC · JPL
481594	2007 TT_{218}	—	September 18, 2007	Mount Lemmon	Mount Lemmon Survey	·	2.0 km	MPC · JPL
481595	2007 TM_{232}	—	October 8, 2007	Kitt Peak	Spacewatch	·	1.2 km	MPC · JPL
481596	2007 TY_{235}	—	October 9, 2007	Mount Lemmon	Mount Lemmon Survey	·	1.4 km	MPC · JPL
481597	2007 TL_{242}	—	October 8, 2007	Catalina	CSS	·	1.7 km	MPC · JPL
481598	2007 TQ_{255}	—	October 10, 2007	Kitt Peak	Spacewatch	·	2.0 km	MPC · JPL
481599	2007 TX_{259}	—	October 10, 2007	Kitt Peak	Spacewatch	·	1.9 km	MPC · JPL
481600	2007 TJ_{276}	—	October 11, 2007	Mount Lemmon	Mount Lemmon Survey	·	1.3 km	MPC · JPL

== 481601–481700 ==
back to top

Designation			Discovery			Properties		Ref
Permanent	Provisional	Named after	Date	Site	Discoverer(s)	Category	Diam.	Ref
481601	2007 TU_{319}	—	September 10, 2007	Mount Lemmon	Mount Lemmon Survey	·	1.5 km	MPC · JPL
481602	2007 TN_{335}	—	October 11, 2007	Kitt Peak	Spacewatch	·	1.6 km	MPC · JPL
481603	2007 TF_{337}	—	October 13, 2007	Kitt Peak	Spacewatch	·	1.2 km	MPC · JPL
481604	2007 TP_{364}	—	October 6, 2007	Kitt Peak	Spacewatch	·	1.9 km	MPC · JPL
481605	2007 TH_{398}	—	October 15, 2007	Mount Lemmon	Mount Lemmon Survey	·	1.9 km	MPC · JPL
481606	2007 TA_{406}	—	October 13, 2007	Kitt Peak	Spacewatch	fast	2.2 km	MPC · JPL
481607	2007 TB_{428}	—	October 10, 2007	Anderson Mesa	LONEOS	·	2.0 km	MPC · JPL
481608	2007 TN_{443}	—	October 8, 2007	Catalina	CSS	·	1.8 km	MPC · JPL
481609	2007 TD_{445}	—	October 12, 2007	Catalina	CSS	·	1.4 km	MPC · JPL
481610	2007 TY_{445}	—	October 8, 2007	Anderson Mesa	LONEOS	·	2.6 km	MPC · JPL
481611	2007 TF_{446}	—	October 8, 2007	Kitt Peak	Spacewatch	·	1.4 km	MPC · JPL
481612	2007 TX_{452}	—	October 19, 2007	Catalina	CSS	JUN	1.0 km	MPC · JPL
481613	2007 UD_{2}	—	October 9, 2007	Catalina	CSS	·	2.0 km	MPC · JPL
481614	2007 UJ_{5}	—	October 8, 2007	Catalina	CSS	·	1.9 km	MPC · JPL
481615	2007 UN_{5}	—	October 10, 2007	Mount Lemmon	Mount Lemmon Survey	·	1.3 km	MPC · JPL
481616	2007 UX_{10}	—	September 25, 2007	Mount Lemmon	Mount Lemmon Survey	·	1.8 km	MPC · JPL
481617	2007 UT_{28}	—	October 8, 2007	Mount Lemmon	Mount Lemmon Survey	·	1.6 km	MPC · JPL
481618	2007 UM_{36}	—	October 19, 2007	Catalina	CSS	·	1.4 km	MPC · JPL
481619	2007 UG_{42}	—	October 16, 2007	Mount Lemmon	Mount Lemmon Survey	MRX	870 m	MPC · JPL
481620	2007 UR_{65}	—	October 29, 2007	Siding Spring	SSS	·	1.8 km	MPC · JPL
481621	2007 UD_{80}	—	October 12, 2007	Kitt Peak	Spacewatch	·	1.6 km	MPC · JPL
481622	2007 UD_{84}	—	October 30, 2007	Kitt Peak	Spacewatch	·	1.9 km	MPC · JPL
481623	2007 UF_{85}	—	October 8, 2007	Mount Lemmon	Mount Lemmon Survey	·	1.5 km	MPC · JPL
481624	2007 UD_{93}	—	October 12, 2007	Kitt Peak	Spacewatch	·	1.4 km	MPC · JPL
481625	2007 UA_{95}	—	October 31, 2007	Mount Lemmon	Mount Lemmon Survey	·	1.3 km	MPC · JPL
481626	2007 UV_{97}	—	November 15, 1998	Kitt Peak	Spacewatch	AGN	1.4 km	MPC · JPL
481627	2007 UZ_{112}	—	October 8, 2007	Kitt Peak	Spacewatch	EUN	1.0 km	MPC · JPL
481628	2007 UY_{123}	—	October 10, 2007	Catalina	CSS	·	2.1 km	MPC · JPL
481629	2007 US_{133}	—	October 20, 2007	Mount Lemmon	Mount Lemmon Survey	·	1.5 km	MPC · JPL
481630	2007 UK_{136}	—	October 19, 2007	Catalina	CSS	·	1.3 km	MPC · JPL
481631	2007 UM_{141}	—	October 30, 2007	Kitt Peak	Spacewatch	·	1.8 km	MPC · JPL
481632	2007 VY_{5}	—	September 11, 2007	Catalina	CSS	·	1.9 km	MPC · JPL
481633	2007 VT_{7}	—	October 21, 2007	Catalina	CSS	·	1.9 km	MPC · JPL
481634	2007 VE_{33}	—	October 19, 2007	Kitt Peak	Spacewatch	·	1.2 km	MPC · JPL
481635	2007 VO_{38}	—	October 21, 2007	Catalina	CSS	EUN	1.5 km	MPC · JPL
481636	2007 VJ_{56}	—	November 1, 2007	Kitt Peak	Spacewatch	·	1.8 km	MPC · JPL
481637	2007 VM_{74}	—	October 16, 2007	Kitt Peak	Spacewatch	·	1.1 km	MPC · JPL
481638	2007 VO_{83}	—	November 4, 2007	Mount Lemmon	Mount Lemmon Survey	·	2.0 km	MPC · JPL
481639	2007 VQ_{85}	—	October 8, 2007	Catalina	CSS	EUN	1.2 km	MPC · JPL
481640	2007 VJ_{91}	—	November 5, 2007	Kitt Peak	Spacewatch	·	1.7 km	MPC · JPL
481641	2007 VY_{97}	—	November 1, 2007	Kitt Peak	Spacewatch	·	1.4 km	MPC · JPL
481642	2007 VC_{114}	—	November 3, 2007	Kitt Peak	Spacewatch	·	1.5 km	MPC · JPL
481643	2007 VD_{116}	—	September 15, 2007	Mount Lemmon	Mount Lemmon Survey	·	1.6 km	MPC · JPL
481644	2007 VT_{126}	—	October 21, 2007	Mount Lemmon	Mount Lemmon Survey	·	1.5 km	MPC · JPL
481645	2007 VT_{135}	—	November 3, 2007	Mount Lemmon	Mount Lemmon Survey	·	1.8 km	MPC · JPL
481646	2007 VH_{142}	—	October 20, 2007	Mount Lemmon	Mount Lemmon Survey	AEO	940 m	MPC · JPL
481647	2007 VS_{144}	—	November 4, 2007	Kitt Peak	Spacewatch	·	1.8 km	MPC · JPL
481648	2007 VZ_{154}	—	November 5, 2007	Kitt Peak	Spacewatch	·	1.2 km	MPC · JPL
481649	2007 VA_{157}	—	November 5, 2007	Kitt Peak	Spacewatch	·	640 m	MPC · JPL
481650	2007 VK_{165}	—	November 5, 2007	Kitt Peak	Spacewatch	·	2.4 km	MPC · JPL
481651	2007 VJ_{175}	—	November 4, 2007	Mount Lemmon	Mount Lemmon Survey	·	1.5 km	MPC · JPL
481652	2007 VR_{181}	—	October 11, 2007	Kitt Peak	Spacewatch	·	1.1 km	MPC · JPL
481653	2007 VA_{193}	—	November 4, 2007	Mount Lemmon	Mount Lemmon Survey	·	2.3 km	MPC · JPL
481654	2007 VS_{197}	—	October 15, 2007	Kitt Peak	Spacewatch	·	1.8 km	MPC · JPL
481655	2007 VX_{223}	—	November 7, 2007	Kitt Peak	Spacewatch	·	1.7 km	MPC · JPL
481656	2007 VL_{224}	—	November 8, 2007	Kitt Peak	Spacewatch	(1547)	1.9 km	MPC · JPL
481657	2007 VJ_{226}	—	November 9, 2007	Catalina	CSS	·	1.6 km	MPC · JPL
481658	2007 VU_{232}	—	October 15, 2007	Mount Lemmon	Mount Lemmon Survey	·	1.5 km	MPC · JPL
481659	2007 VR_{270}	—	November 13, 2007	Kitt Peak	Spacewatch	·	1.4 km	MPC · JPL
481660	2007 VO_{272}	—	November 11, 2007	Mount Lemmon	Mount Lemmon Survey	RAF	740 m	MPC · JPL
481661	2007 VG_{277}	—	November 2, 2007	Kitt Peak	Spacewatch	·	1.4 km	MPC · JPL
481662	2007 VE_{282}	—	October 20, 2007	Mount Lemmon	Mount Lemmon Survey	·	2.1 km	MPC · JPL
481663	2007 VM_{292}	—	November 14, 2007	Kitt Peak	Spacewatch	·	1.5 km	MPC · JPL
481664	2007 VV_{298}	—	September 13, 2007	Catalina	CSS	·	1.6 km	MPC · JPL
481665	2007 VX_{300}	—	October 11, 2007	Anderson Mesa	LONEOS	·	1.7 km	MPC · JPL
481666	2007 VJ_{310}	—	November 7, 2007	Mount Lemmon	Mount Lemmon Survey	·	1.4 km	MPC · JPL
481667	2007 VD_{313}	—	November 6, 2007	Kitt Peak	Spacewatch	·	1.6 km	MPC · JPL
481668	2007 VJ_{316}	—	November 3, 2007	Mount Lemmon	Mount Lemmon Survey	·	2.1 km	MPC · JPL
481669	2007 VF_{317}	—	November 12, 2007	Mount Lemmon	Mount Lemmon Survey	·	1.4 km	MPC · JPL
481670	2007 VZ_{318}	—	November 2, 2007	Kitt Peak	Spacewatch	·	1.0 km	MPC · JPL
481671	2007 VP_{324}	—	November 8, 2007	Socorro	LINEAR	EUN	1.0 km	MPC · JPL
481672	2007 WY_{10}	—	November 17, 2007	Catalina	CSS	·	1.9 km	MPC · JPL
481673	2007 WF_{53}	—	September 10, 2007	Mount Lemmon	Mount Lemmon Survey	EUN	930 m	MPC · JPL
481674	2007 XB_{51}	—	November 18, 2007	Kitt Peak	Spacewatch	·	1.5 km	MPC · JPL
481675	2007 XR_{56}	—	December 20, 2007	Mount Lemmon	Mount Lemmon Survey	·	2.3 km	MPC · JPL
481676	2007 YT_{3}	—	December 20, 2007	Catalina	CSS	·	3.5 km	MPC · JPL
481677	2007 YP_{20}	—	December 4, 2007	Kitt Peak	Spacewatch	·	1.5 km	MPC · JPL
481678	2007 YW_{34}	—	October 15, 2007	Kitt Peak	Spacewatch	JUN	1.1 km	MPC · JPL
481679	2007 YZ_{36}	—	November 5, 2007	Mount Lemmon	Mount Lemmon Survey	·	1.6 km	MPC · JPL
481680	2007 YF_{49}	—	December 4, 2007	Kitt Peak	Spacewatch	GEF	1.3 km	MPC · JPL
481681	2007 YG_{53}	—	December 18, 2007	Mount Lemmon	Mount Lemmon Survey	·	2.6 km	MPC · JPL
481682	2007 YJ_{53}	—	December 30, 2007	Catalina	CSS	·	2.1 km	MPC · JPL
481683	2007 YT_{62}	—	December 30, 2007	Kitt Peak	Spacewatch	·	1.7 km	MPC · JPL
481684	2008 AP_{7}	—	December 5, 2007	Mount Lemmon	Mount Lemmon Survey	·	1.6 km	MPC · JPL
481685	2008 AU_{8}	—	January 10, 2008	Kitt Peak	Spacewatch	·	1.2 km	MPC · JPL
481686	2008 AJ_{17}	—	December 30, 2007	Mount Lemmon	Mount Lemmon Survey	·	960 m	MPC · JPL
481687	2008 AT_{18}	—	January 10, 2008	Mount Lemmon	Mount Lemmon Survey	(13314)	1.5 km	MPC · JPL
481688	2008 AX_{21}	—	January 10, 2008	Mount Lemmon	Mount Lemmon Survey	·	1.2 km	MPC · JPL
481689	2008 AE_{35}	—	December 14, 2007	Mount Lemmon	Mount Lemmon Survey	·	2.3 km	MPC · JPL
481690	2008 AO_{39}	—	November 19, 2007	Mount Lemmon	Mount Lemmon Survey	·	1.6 km	MPC · JPL
481691	2008 AF_{56}	—	January 11, 2008	Kitt Peak	Spacewatch	·	1.6 km	MPC · JPL
481692	2008 AD_{62}	—	December 30, 2007	Mount Lemmon	Mount Lemmon Survey	·	1.8 km	MPC · JPL
481693	2008 AL_{74}	—	December 30, 2007	Kitt Peak	Spacewatch	·	1.4 km	MPC · JPL
481694	2008 AZ_{80}	—	January 12, 2008	Kitt Peak	Spacewatch	·	2.6 km	MPC · JPL
481695	2008 AN_{109}	—	January 15, 2008	Kitt Peak	Spacewatch	·	1.6 km	MPC · JPL
481696	2008 AE_{115}	—	January 1, 2008	Kitt Peak	Spacewatch	·	2.1 km	MPC · JPL
481697	2008 AS_{136}	—	January 13, 2008	Mount Lemmon	Mount Lemmon Survey	·	2.2 km	MPC · JPL
481698	2008 BM_{9}	—	January 16, 2008	Kitt Peak	Spacewatch	·	1.6 km	MPC · JPL
481699	2008 BY_{12}	—	January 11, 2008	Kitt Peak	Spacewatch	·	1.8 km	MPC · JPL
481700	2008 BL_{34}	—	January 30, 2008	Kitt Peak	Spacewatch	·	2.0 km	MPC · JPL

== 481701–481800 ==
back to top

Designation			Discovery			Properties		Ref
Permanent	Provisional	Named after	Date	Site	Discoverer(s)	Category	Diam.	Ref
481701	2008 BC_{49}	—	January 18, 2008	Kitt Peak	Spacewatch	·	2.1 km	MPC · JPL
481702	2008 CF_{8}	—	February 2, 2008	Mount Lemmon	Mount Lemmon Survey	·	2.0 km	MPC · JPL
481703	2008 CH_{12}	—	February 3, 2008	Kitt Peak	Spacewatch	·	1.6 km	MPC · JPL
481704	2008 CJ_{28}	—	February 2, 2008	Kitt Peak	Spacewatch	·	1.9 km	MPC · JPL
481705	2008 CY_{31}	—	February 2, 2008	Kitt Peak	Spacewatch	·	1.7 km	MPC · JPL
481706	2008 CT_{35}	—	February 2, 2008	Kitt Peak	Spacewatch	·	1.7 km	MPC · JPL
481707	2008 CM_{53}	—	February 7, 2008	Mount Lemmon	Mount Lemmon Survey	·	790 m	MPC · JPL
481708	2008 CY_{139}	—	February 8, 2008	Kitt Peak	Spacewatch	·	1.7 km	MPC · JPL
481709	2008 CU_{149}	—	February 2, 2008	Kitt Peak	Spacewatch	GEF	1.0 km	MPC · JPL
481710	2008 CT_{177}	—	January 18, 2008	Mount Lemmon	Mount Lemmon Survey	·	1.6 km	MPC · JPL
481711	2008 CF_{184}	—	December 5, 2007	Mount Lemmon	Mount Lemmon Survey	·	1.8 km	MPC · JPL
481712	2008 CD_{202}	—	February 2, 2008	Kitt Peak	Spacewatch	·	580 m	MPC · JPL
481713	2008 CZ_{205}	—	February 3, 2008	Kitt Peak	Spacewatch	·	620 m	MPC · JPL
481714	2008 DT	—	January 30, 2008	Mount Lemmon	Mount Lemmon Survey	·	1.8 km	MPC · JPL
481715	2008 EY_{11}	—	March 1, 2008	Kitt Peak	Spacewatch	·	2.1 km	MPC · JPL
481716	2008 EZ_{46}	—	March 5, 2008	Mount Lemmon	Mount Lemmon Survey	·	1.6 km	MPC · JPL
481717	2008 EF_{70}	—	February 18, 2008	Mount Lemmon	Mount Lemmon Survey	·	1.8 km	MPC · JPL
481718	2008 EV_{96}	—	February 12, 2008	Kitt Peak	Spacewatch	DOR	1.8 km	MPC · JPL
481719	2008 EA_{97}	—	March 7, 2008	Catalina	CSS	·	760 m	MPC · JPL
481720	2008 EP_{117}	—	January 13, 2008	Kitt Peak	Spacewatch	·	2.3 km	MPC · JPL
481721	2008 ER_{154}	—	March 8, 2008	Kitt Peak	Spacewatch	·	2.1 km	MPC · JPL
481722	2008 EO_{160}	—	March 1, 2008	Kitt Peak	Spacewatch	·	1.7 km	MPC · JPL
481723	2008 EO_{167}	—	March 8, 2008	Mount Lemmon	Mount Lemmon Survey	·	2.3 km	MPC · JPL
481724	2008 EU_{167}	—	March 10, 2008	Kitt Peak	Spacewatch	·	1.6 km	MPC · JPL
481725	2008 ER_{168}	—	March 12, 2008	Mount Lemmon	Mount Lemmon Survey	·	3.0 km	MPC · JPL
481726	2008 FW_{22}	—	March 10, 2008	Mount Lemmon	Mount Lemmon Survey	EOS	1.9 km	MPC · JPL
481727	2008 FE_{23}	—	March 27, 2008	Kitt Peak	Spacewatch	·	770 m	MPC · JPL
481728	2008 FM_{26}	—	March 27, 2008	Kitt Peak	Spacewatch	·	3.9 km	MPC · JPL
481729	2008 FP_{70}	—	March 28, 2008	Kitt Peak	Spacewatch	·	3.1 km	MPC · JPL
481730	2008 FJ_{100}	—	March 30, 2008	Kitt Peak	Spacewatch	·	1.6 km	MPC · JPL
481731	2008 FU_{101}	—	March 30, 2008	Kitt Peak	Spacewatch	VER	4.0 km	MPC · JPL
481732	2008 FD_{107}	—	March 31, 2008	Kitt Peak	Spacewatch	·	1.6 km	MPC · JPL
481733	2008 GJ_{2}	—	April 6, 2008	Mount Lemmon	Mount Lemmon Survey	·	2.5 km	MPC · JPL
481734	2008 GS_{19}	—	October 31, 2005	Catalina	CSS	EOS	2.7 km	MPC · JPL
481735	2008 GP_{21}	—	March 29, 2008	Catalina	CSS	T_{j} (2.95)	3.7 km	MPC · JPL
481736	2008 GS_{22}	—	March 8, 2008	Kitt Peak	Spacewatch	DOR	1.8 km	MPC · JPL
481737	2008 GX_{22}	—	February 29, 2008	Kitt Peak	Spacewatch	·	590 m	MPC · JPL
481738	2008 GP_{23}	—	April 1, 2008	Mount Lemmon	Mount Lemmon Survey	EOS	1.9 km	MPC · JPL
481739	2008 GB_{51}	—	April 5, 2008	Mount Lemmon	Mount Lemmon Survey	·	1.8 km	MPC · JPL
481740	2008 GK_{80}	—	January 24, 2007	Mount Lemmon	Mount Lemmon Survey	·	2.3 km	MPC · JPL
481741	2008 GL_{103}	—	April 11, 2008	Kitt Peak	Spacewatch	·	4.6 km	MPC · JPL
481742	2008 GH_{115}	—	April 11, 2008	Kitt Peak	Spacewatch	·	2.9 km	MPC · JPL
481743	2008 GC_{120}	—	April 12, 2008	Kitt Peak	Spacewatch	·	720 m	MPC · JPL
481744	2008 GT_{126}	—	April 14, 2008	Mount Lemmon	Mount Lemmon Survey	L5	8.2 km	MPC · JPL
481745	2008 GN_{130}	—	April 6, 2008	Kitt Peak	Spacewatch	EOS	1.9 km	MPC · JPL
481746	2008 GX_{132}	—	April 14, 2008	Mount Lemmon	Mount Lemmon Survey	·	3.0 km	MPC · JPL
481747	2008 GD_{140}	—	April 6, 2008	Kitt Peak	Spacewatch	L5	8.9 km	MPC · JPL
481748	2008 GE_{144}	—	April 3, 2008	Kitt Peak	Spacewatch	TEL	1.2 km	MPC · JPL
481749	2008 HP_{19}	—	April 6, 2008	Kitt Peak	Spacewatch	·	3.0 km	MPC · JPL
481750	2008 HN_{23}	—	April 27, 2008	Kitt Peak	Spacewatch	·	2.9 km	MPC · JPL
481751	2008 HQ_{37}	—	October 31, 2005	Mount Lemmon	Mount Lemmon Survey	·	3.8 km	MPC · JPL
481752	2008 HE_{53}	—	April 6, 2008	Mount Lemmon	Mount Lemmon Survey	EOS	2.1 km	MPC · JPL
481753	2008 HU_{57}	—	April 30, 2008	Kitt Peak	Spacewatch	EOS	1.7 km	MPC · JPL
481754	2008 HK_{69}	—	April 17, 2008	Mount Lemmon	Mount Lemmon Survey	·	4.3 km	MPC · JPL
481755	2008 JM_{3}	—	April 3, 2008	Kitt Peak	Spacewatch	·	500 m	MPC · JPL
481756	2008 JM_{13}	—	December 27, 2005	Mount Lemmon	Mount Lemmon Survey	·	3.0 km	MPC · JPL
481757	2008 JC_{29}	—	May 3, 2008	Mount Lemmon	Mount Lemmon Survey	PHO	900 m	MPC · JPL
481758	2008 KF	—	March 28, 2008	Mount Lemmon	Mount Lemmon Survey	·	2.9 km	MPC · JPL
481759	2008 KZ_{1}	—	May 6, 2008	Mount Lemmon	Mount Lemmon Survey	·	4.2 km	MPC · JPL
481760	2008 KG_{24}	—	May 28, 2008	Kitt Peak	Spacewatch	·	3.5 km	MPC · JPL
481761	2008 KQ_{27}	—	May 5, 2008	Mount Lemmon	Mount Lemmon Survey	·	640 m	MPC · JPL
481762	2008 LB_{12}	—	June 7, 2008	Kitt Peak	Spacewatch	·	1.8 km	MPC · JPL
481763	2008 MD	—	June 22, 2008	Kitt Peak	Spacewatch	·	750 m	MPC · JPL
481764	2008 MB_{2}	—	June 3, 2008	Kitt Peak	Spacewatch	VER	2.8 km	MPC · JPL
481765	2008 ON_{3}	—	May 29, 2008	Mount Lemmon	Mount Lemmon Survey	·	1.3 km	MPC · JPL
481766	2008 PD_{9}	—	August 7, 2008	Dauban	Kugel, F.	·	1.3 km	MPC · JPL
481767	2008 QN_{8}	—	August 7, 2008	Kitt Peak	Spacewatch	MAS	710 m	MPC · JPL
481768	2008 QZ_{34}	—	August 7, 2008	Kitt Peak	Spacewatch	NYS	1.1 km	MPC · JPL
481769	2008 RL_{37}	—	September 2, 2008	Kitt Peak	Spacewatch	·	1.0 km	MPC · JPL
481770	2008 RY_{40}	—	August 22, 2008	Kitt Peak	Spacewatch	·	1.1 km	MPC · JPL
481771	2008 RY_{76}	—	September 6, 2008	Catalina	CSS	·	1.2 km	MPC · JPL
481772	2008 RC_{89}	—	September 5, 2008	Kitt Peak	Spacewatch	V	710 m	MPC · JPL
481773	2008 SO_{4}	—	September 22, 2008	Socorro	LINEAR	·	1.4 km	MPC · JPL
481774	2008 SW_{4}	—	September 22, 2008	Socorro	LINEAR	·	1.5 km	MPC · JPL
481775	2008 SX_{7}	—	September 21, 2008	Siding Spring	SSS	AMO	730 m	MPC · JPL
481776	2008 SB_{32}	—	September 20, 2008	Kitt Peak	Spacewatch	·	1.4 km	MPC · JPL
481777	2008 SQ_{89}	—	September 21, 2008	Kitt Peak	Spacewatch	·	1.1 km	MPC · JPL
481778	2008 SW_{98}	—	September 21, 2008	Kitt Peak	Spacewatch	·	1.2 km	MPC · JPL
481779	2008 SR_{114}	—	September 22, 2008	Kitt Peak	Spacewatch	·	750 m	MPC · JPL
481780	2008 SL_{116}	—	September 22, 2008	Kitt Peak	Spacewatch	·	1.1 km	MPC · JPL
481781	2008 SM_{131}	—	September 22, 2008	Kitt Peak	Spacewatch	·	1.2 km	MPC · JPL
481782	2008 SM_{138}	—	September 23, 2008	Mount Lemmon	Mount Lemmon Survey	·	1.2 km	MPC · JPL
481783	2008 SD_{164}	—	September 28, 2008	Socorro	LINEAR	MAS	750 m	MPC · JPL
481784	2008 ST_{172}	—	September 22, 2008	Kitt Peak	Spacewatch	·	1.2 km	MPC · JPL
481785	2008 SE_{289}	—	September 25, 2008	Kitt Peak	Spacewatch	·	600 m	MPC · JPL
481786	2008 SD_{291}	—	September 21, 2008	Kitt Peak	Spacewatch	·	1.1 km	MPC · JPL
481787	2008 SF_{298}	—	September 20, 2008	Catalina	CSS	H	550 m	MPC · JPL
481788	2008 SD_{300}	—	September 22, 2008	Kitt Peak	Spacewatch	·	820 m	MPC · JPL
481789	2008 SQ_{304}	—	September 24, 2008	Kitt Peak	Spacewatch	·	1.0 km	MPC · JPL
481790	2008 TF_{4}	—	October 7, 2008	Socorro	LINEAR	AMO	480 m	MPC · JPL
481791	2008 TZ_{21}	—	October 1, 2008	Mount Lemmon	Mount Lemmon Survey	T_{j} (2.97) · 3:2	4.7 km	MPC · JPL
481792	2008 TZ_{25}	—	October 8, 2008	Socorro	LINEAR	H	580 m	MPC · JPL
481793	2008 TT_{35}	—	September 2, 2008	Kitt Peak	Spacewatch	NYS	1.2 km	MPC · JPL
481794	2008 TC_{42}	—	October 1, 2008	Mount Lemmon	Mount Lemmon Survey	PHO	950 m	MPC · JPL
481795	2008 TO_{61}	—	September 22, 2008	Mount Lemmon	Mount Lemmon Survey	·	1.0 km	MPC · JPL
481796	2008 TC_{66}	—	October 2, 2008	Kitt Peak	Spacewatch	NYS	1.1 km	MPC · JPL
481797	2008 TL_{66}	—	October 2, 2008	Kitt Peak	Spacewatch	·	1.0 km	MPC · JPL
481798	2008 TY_{66}	—	October 2, 2008	Kitt Peak	Spacewatch	MAS	650 m	MPC · JPL
481799	2008 TT_{90}	—	September 29, 2008	Kitt Peak	Spacewatch	·	740 m	MPC · JPL
481800	2008 TO_{91}	—	September 23, 2008	Kitt Peak	Spacewatch	MAS	760 m	MPC · JPL

== 481801–481900 ==
back to top

Designation			Discovery			Properties		Ref
Permanent	Provisional	Named after	Date	Site	Discoverer(s)	Category	Diam.	Ref
481801	2008 TS_{97}	—	January 4, 2006	Mount Lemmon	Mount Lemmon Survey	V	720 m	MPC · JPL
481802	2008 TU_{102}	—	September 22, 2008	Kitt Peak	Spacewatch	·	1.1 km	MPC · JPL
481803	2008 TW_{108}	—	October 6, 2008	Mount Lemmon	Mount Lemmon Survey	·	1.1 km	MPC · JPL
481804	2008 TP_{112}	—	October 6, 2008	Catalina	CSS	·	1.1 km	MPC · JPL
481805	2008 TE_{135}	—	October 8, 2008	Kitt Peak	Spacewatch	NYS	1.0 km	MPC · JPL
481806	2008 TV_{169}	—	October 8, 2008	Kitt Peak	Spacewatch	MAS	680 m	MPC · JPL
481807	2008 TT_{173}	—	October 1, 2008	Kitt Peak	Spacewatch	3:2	4.2 km	MPC · JPL
481808	2008 TY_{176}	—	October 1, 2008	Kitt Peak	Spacewatch	·	760 m	MPC · JPL
481809	2008 TL_{182}	—	October 1, 2008	Kitt Peak	Spacewatch	·	1.1 km	MPC · JPL
481810	2008 UB_{49}	—	October 3, 2008	Mount Lemmon	Mount Lemmon Survey	·	890 m	MPC · JPL
481811	2008 UN_{51}	—	October 20, 2008	Kitt Peak	Spacewatch	·	910 m	MPC · JPL
481812	2008 UU_{53}	—	October 20, 2008	Kitt Peak	Spacewatch	PHO	1.0 km	MPC · JPL
481813	2008 UP_{54}	—	September 29, 2008	Mount Lemmon	Mount Lemmon Survey	H	600 m	MPC · JPL
481814	2008 UC_{57}	—	September 29, 2008	Kitt Peak	Spacewatch	·	920 m	MPC · JPL
481815	2008 UK_{58}	—	September 7, 2008	Mount Lemmon	Mount Lemmon Survey	PHO	790 m	MPC · JPL
481816	2008 UD_{66}	—	October 21, 2008	Kitt Peak	Spacewatch	·	1.6 km	MPC · JPL
481817	2008 UL_{90}	—	October 26, 2008	Mount Lemmon	Mount Lemmon Survey	IEO · PHA	720 m	MPC · JPL
481818	2008 UL_{112}	—	October 22, 2008	Kitt Peak	Spacewatch	·	1.2 km	MPC · JPL
481819	2008 UK_{114}	—	September 28, 2008	Mount Lemmon	Mount Lemmon Survey	·	1.4 km	MPC · JPL
481820	2008 UV_{114}	—	September 29, 2008	Mount Lemmon	Mount Lemmon Survey	·	1.6 km	MPC · JPL
481821	2008 UE_{180}	—	October 24, 2008	Kitt Peak	Spacewatch	3:2	4.4 km	MPC · JPL
481822	2008 UR_{184}	—	October 24, 2008	Kitt Peak	Spacewatch	H	560 m	MPC · JPL
481823	2008 UY_{194}	—	October 26, 2008	Kitt Peak	Spacewatch	NYS	1.2 km	MPC · JPL
481824	2008 UU_{226}	—	October 25, 2008	Kitt Peak	Spacewatch	·	1.1 km	MPC · JPL
481825	2008 UD_{235}	—	September 23, 2008	Kitt Peak	Spacewatch	·	450 m	MPC · JPL
481826	2008 UK_{263}	—	October 27, 2008	Kitt Peak	Spacewatch	·	1.1 km	MPC · JPL
481827	2008 UY_{300}	—	October 29, 2008	Kitt Peak	Spacewatch	H	570 m	MPC · JPL
481828	2008 UU_{343}	—	October 23, 2008	Kitt Peak	Spacewatch	·	820 m	MPC · JPL
481829	2008 UW_{350}	—	October 20, 2008	Mount Lemmon	Mount Lemmon Survey	·	1.1 km	MPC · JPL
481830	2008 UC_{368}	—	October 30, 2008	Socorro	LINEAR	·	1.3 km	MPC · JPL
481831	2008 VE_{33}	—	September 27, 2008	Mount Lemmon	Mount Lemmon Survey	NYS	1.0 km	MPC · JPL
481832	2008 VG_{57}	—	September 27, 2008	Mount Lemmon	Mount Lemmon Survey	·	1.5 km	MPC · JPL
481833	2008 VY_{65}	—	November 1, 2008	Mount Lemmon	Mount Lemmon Survey	MAS	710 m	MPC · JPL
481834	2008 VS_{72}	—	November 8, 2008	Kitt Peak	Spacewatch	·	1.1 km	MPC · JPL
481835	2008 VS_{76}	—	November 4, 2004	Kitt Peak	Spacewatch	·	1.1 km	MPC · JPL
481836	2008 VW_{78}	—	November 8, 2008	Mount Lemmon	Mount Lemmon Survey	·	1.8 km	MPC · JPL
481837	2008 WR_{1}	—	November 18, 2008	Socorro	LINEAR	·	1.3 km	MPC · JPL
481838	2008 WC_{38}	—	November 17, 2008	Kitt Peak	Spacewatch	·	950 m	MPC · JPL
481839	2008 WS_{45}	—	November 17, 2008	Kitt Peak	Spacewatch	T_{j} (2.99) · 3:2	4.2 km	MPC · JPL
481840	2008 WC_{46}	—	November 17, 2008	Kitt Peak	Spacewatch	T_{j} (2.97)	3.8 km	MPC · JPL
481841	2008 WS_{48}	—	November 18, 2008	Catalina	CSS	·	1.4 km	MPC · JPL
481842	2008 WV_{73}	—	November 19, 2008	Mount Lemmon	Mount Lemmon Survey	·	1.4 km	MPC · JPL
481843	2008 WE_{82}	—	November 20, 2008	Kitt Peak	Spacewatch	T_{j} (2.99) · 3:2	4.0 km	MPC · JPL
481844	2008 WH_{94}	—	November 26, 2008	La Sagra	OAM	·	2.3 km	MPC · JPL
481845	2008 WG_{98}	—	October 25, 2008	Mount Lemmon	Mount Lemmon Survey	·	1.6 km	MPC · JPL
481846	2008 WO_{112}	—	November 6, 2008	Mount Lemmon	Mount Lemmon Survey	·	930 m	MPC · JPL
481847	2008 WN_{133}	—	November 17, 2008	Catalina	CSS	H	690 m	MPC · JPL
481848	2008 WV_{133}	—	November 19, 2008	Kitt Peak	Spacewatch	H	530 m	MPC · JPL
481849	2008 WO_{138}	—	November 18, 2008	Socorro	LINEAR	·	1.2 km	MPC · JPL
481850	2008 WU_{139}	—	November 30, 2008	Socorro	LINEAR	·	1.3 km	MPC · JPL
481851	2008 XR	—	December 3, 2008	Catalina	CSS	H	480 m	MPC · JPL
481852	2008 XY_{5}	—	December 4, 2008	Socorro	LINEAR	T_{j} (2.94)	3.9 km	MPC · JPL
481853	2008 XK_{15}	—	November 24, 2008	Kitt Peak	Spacewatch	H	570 m	MPC · JPL
481854	2008 XW_{16}	—	November 19, 2008	Kitt Peak	Spacewatch	·	1.0 km	MPC · JPL
481855	2008 XR_{36}	—	December 2, 2008	Kitt Peak	Spacewatch	·	2.3 km	MPC · JPL
481856	2008 XX_{41}	—	December 2, 2008	Kitt Peak	Spacewatch	·	1.1 km	MPC · JPL
481857	2008 XE_{47}	—	December 4, 2008	Mount Lemmon	Mount Lemmon Survey	H	690 m	MPC · JPL
481858	2008 XQ_{47}	—	December 4, 2008	Mount Lemmon	Mount Lemmon Survey	·	890 m	MPC · JPL
481859	2008 YB_{8}	—	December 23, 2008	Dauban	Kugel, F.	·	1.2 km	MPC · JPL
481860	2008 YB_{24}	—	December 21, 2008	Mount Lemmon	Mount Lemmon Survey	·	1.4 km	MPC · JPL
481861	2008 YZ_{34}	—	November 8, 2008	Mount Lemmon	Mount Lemmon Survey	·	1.7 km	MPC · JPL
481862	2008 YO_{40}	—	December 29, 2008	Mount Lemmon	Mount Lemmon Survey	·	1.3 km	MPC · JPL
481863	2008 YZ_{48}	—	December 29, 2008	Mount Lemmon	Mount Lemmon Survey	·	1.7 km	MPC · JPL
481864	2008 YH_{50}	—	December 29, 2008	Mount Lemmon	Mount Lemmon Survey	EUN	1.4 km	MPC · JPL
481865	2008 YB_{52}	—	December 29, 2008	Mount Lemmon	Mount Lemmon Survey	·	960 m	MPC · JPL
481866	2008 YE_{54}	—	December 29, 2008	Mount Lemmon	Mount Lemmon Survey	·	1.7 km	MPC · JPL
481867	2008 YD_{57}	—	December 30, 2008	Kitt Peak	Spacewatch	·	1.3 km	MPC · JPL
481868	2008 YE_{78}	—	November 23, 2008	Mount Lemmon	Mount Lemmon Survey	EUN	1.3 km	MPC · JPL
481869	2008 YB_{90}	—	December 29, 2008	Kitt Peak	Spacewatch	·	1.8 km	MPC · JPL
481870	2008 YU_{91}	—	December 21, 2008	Kitt Peak	Spacewatch	·	1.1 km	MPC · JPL
481871	2008 YR_{92}	—	December 29, 2008	Kitt Peak	Spacewatch	·	830 m	MPC · JPL
481872	2008 YD_{105}	—	December 29, 2008	Kitt Peak	Spacewatch	·	1.2 km	MPC · JPL
481873	2008 YV_{110}	—	November 21, 2008	Kitt Peak	Spacewatch	·	1.0 km	MPC · JPL
481874	2008 YY_{114}	—	November 2, 2008	Mount Lemmon	Mount Lemmon Survey	(5)	940 m	MPC · JPL
481875	2008 YN_{118}	—	December 29, 2008	Kitt Peak	Spacewatch	·	930 m	MPC · JPL
481876	2008 YF_{125}	—	December 30, 2008	Kitt Peak	Spacewatch	·	1.0 km	MPC · JPL
481877	2008 YH_{137}	—	December 30, 2008	Kitt Peak	Spacewatch	·	1.3 km	MPC · JPL
481878	2008 YA_{143}	—	December 30, 2008	Kitt Peak	Spacewatch	·	1.1 km	MPC · JPL
481879	2008 YP_{147}	—	January 16, 2005	Kitt Peak	Spacewatch	EUN	880 m	MPC · JPL
481880	2008 YU_{153}	—	December 21, 2008	Mount Lemmon	Mount Lemmon Survey	·	910 m	MPC · JPL
481881	2008 YH_{159}	—	December 31, 2008	Kitt Peak	Spacewatch	·	1.9 km	MPC · JPL
481882	2008 YY_{159}	—	December 22, 2008	Kitt Peak	Spacewatch	·	930 m	MPC · JPL
481883	2008 YD_{162}	—	December 21, 2008	Mount Lemmon	Mount Lemmon Survey	BRG	1.2 km	MPC · JPL
481884	2008 YS_{166}	—	December 22, 2008	Catalina	CSS	H	690 m	MPC · JPL
481885	2008 YW_{172}	—	December 30, 2008	Kitt Peak	Spacewatch	·	1.1 km	MPC · JPL
481886	2008 YZ_{172}	—	December 29, 2008	Kitt Peak	Spacewatch	·	1.1 km	MPC · JPL
481887	2009 AG_{13}	—	January 2, 2009	Mount Lemmon	Mount Lemmon Survey	T_{j} (2.99) · 3:2	3.7 km	MPC · JPL
481888	2009 AO_{15}	—	January 4, 2009	Farra d'Isonzo	Farra d'Isonzo	·	2.4 km	MPC · JPL
481889	2009 AO_{24}	—	January 3, 2009	Kitt Peak	Spacewatch	·	1.2 km	MPC · JPL
481890	2009 AW_{26}	—	February 4, 2005	Kitt Peak	Spacewatch	·	750 m	MPC · JPL
481891	2009 AN_{27}	—	January 2, 2009	Kitt Peak	Spacewatch	·	1.3 km	MPC · JPL
481892	2009 AW_{27}	—	January 2, 2009	Kitt Peak	Spacewatch	·	1.4 km	MPC · JPL
481893	2009 AA_{32}	—	January 15, 2009	Kitt Peak	Spacewatch	H	590 m	MPC · JPL
481894	2009 AX_{39}	—	November 1, 2008	Mount Lemmon	Mount Lemmon Survey	·	1.1 km	MPC · JPL
481895	2009 AF_{42}	—	January 1, 2009	Kitt Peak	Spacewatch	·	1.0 km	MPC · JPL
481896	2009 AF_{44}	—	January 3, 2009	Mount Lemmon	Mount Lemmon Survey	·	1.5 km	MPC · JPL
481897	2009 AR_{44}	—	January 15, 2009	Kitt Peak	Spacewatch	·	820 m	MPC · JPL
481898	2009 AC_{45}	—	January 3, 2009	Mount Lemmon	Mount Lemmon Survey	JUN	1.0 km	MPC · JPL
481899	2009 AR_{48}	—	January 3, 2009	Mount Lemmon	Mount Lemmon Survey	EUN	1.1 km	MPC · JPL
481900	2009 AJ_{49}	—	October 31, 2008	Mount Lemmon	Mount Lemmon Survey	·	980 m	MPC · JPL

== 481901–482000 ==
back to top

Designation			Discovery			Properties		Ref
Permanent	Provisional	Named after	Date	Site	Discoverer(s)	Category	Diam.	Ref
481901	2009 BS_{1}	—	January 17, 2009	Kitt Peak	Spacewatch	H	680 m	MPC · JPL
481902	2009 BK_{7}	—	January 18, 2009	Socorro	LINEAR	·	1.1 km	MPC · JPL
481903	2009 BL_{9}	—	January 18, 2009	Socorro	LINEAR	H	620 m	MPC · JPL
481904	2009 BB_{11}	—	January 25, 2009	Catalina	CSS	AMO	470 m	MPC · JPL
481905	2009 BO_{13}	—	January 18, 2009	Mount Lemmon	Mount Lemmon Survey	·	1.3 km	MPC · JPL
481906	2009 BS_{18}	—	January 3, 2009	Kitt Peak	Spacewatch	·	1.3 km	MPC · JPL
481907	2009 BC_{26}	—	January 16, 2009	Kitt Peak	Spacewatch	·	1.4 km	MPC · JPL
481908	2009 BA_{29}	—	January 16, 2009	Kitt Peak	Spacewatch	·	1.5 km	MPC · JPL
481909	2009 BH_{32}	—	January 16, 2009	Kitt Peak	Spacewatch	·	1.1 km	MPC · JPL
481910	2009 BE_{42}	—	January 16, 2009	Kitt Peak	Spacewatch	·	1.0 km	MPC · JPL
481911	2009 BW_{44}	—	January 16, 2009	Kitt Peak	Spacewatch	EUN	1.1 km	MPC · JPL
481912	2009 BU_{48}	—	January 16, 2009	Mount Lemmon	Mount Lemmon Survey	·	870 m	MPC · JPL
481913	2009 BM_{53}	—	December 1, 2008	Mount Lemmon	Mount Lemmon Survey	·	1.4 km	MPC · JPL
481914	2009 BH_{59}	—	January 2, 2009	Kitt Peak	Spacewatch	·	1.0 km	MPC · JPL
481915	2009 BX_{62}	—	December 21, 2008	Mount Lemmon	Mount Lemmon Survey	·	750 m	MPC · JPL
481916	2009 BV_{73}	—	January 30, 2009	Catalina	CSS	·	1.8 km	MPC · JPL
481917	2009 BY_{75}	—	December 22, 2008	Mount Lemmon	Mount Lemmon Survey	ADE	2.0 km	MPC · JPL
481918	2009 BE_{77}	—	January 30, 2009	Siding Spring	SSS	T_{j} (2.8) · APO +1km	810 m	MPC · JPL
481919	2009 BT_{77}	—	January 25, 2009	Socorro	LINEAR	·	1.6 km	MPC · JPL
481920	2009 BW_{77}	—	November 8, 2008	Kitt Peak	Spacewatch	·	1.4 km	MPC · JPL
481921	2009 BT_{80}	—	January 31, 2009	Socorro	LINEAR	·	1.3 km	MPC · JPL
481922	2009 BW_{81}	—	January 31, 2009	Vail-Jarnac	Jarnac	·	1.2 km	MPC · JPL
481923	2009 BA_{82}	—	December 30, 2008	Mount Lemmon	Mount Lemmon Survey	·	910 m	MPC · JPL
481924	2009 BC_{83}	—	January 20, 2009	Catalina	CSS	·	1.2 km	MPC · JPL
481925	2009 BE_{84}	—	January 2, 2009	Mount Lemmon	Mount Lemmon Survey	·	1.3 km	MPC · JPL
481926	2009 BW_{85}	—	January 25, 2009	Kitt Peak	Spacewatch	·	800 m	MPC · JPL
481927	2009 BG_{89}	—	January 3, 2009	Mount Lemmon	Mount Lemmon Survey	·	1.5 km	MPC · JPL
481928	2009 BL_{95}	—	January 16, 2009	Kitt Peak	Spacewatch	·	1.9 km	MPC · JPL
481929	2009 BH_{96}	—	April 7, 2005	Anderson Mesa	LONEOS	·	3.0 km	MPC · JPL
481930	2009 BZ_{98}	—	January 26, 2009	Mount Lemmon	Mount Lemmon Survey	·	1.1 km	MPC · JPL
481931	2009 BB_{109}	—	January 3, 2009	Kitt Peak	Spacewatch	·	870 m	MPC · JPL
481932	2009 BQ_{120}	—	January 31, 2009	Kitt Peak	Spacewatch	H	630 m	MPC · JPL
481933	2009 BJ_{123}	—	January 31, 2009	Kitt Peak	Spacewatch	(5)	980 m	MPC · JPL
481934	2009 BR_{123}	—	November 24, 2008	Mount Lemmon	Mount Lemmon Survey	·	1.1 km	MPC · JPL
481935	2009 BT_{152}	—	January 31, 2009	Kitt Peak	Spacewatch	·	720 m	MPC · JPL
481936	2009 BM_{153}	—	January 2, 2009	Mount Lemmon	Mount Lemmon Survey	·	1.2 km	MPC · JPL
481937	2009 BC_{155}	—	January 1, 2009	Mount Lemmon	Mount Lemmon Survey	·	1.8 km	MPC · JPL
481938	2009 BL_{185}	—	January 18, 2009	Catalina	CSS	·	1.5 km	MPC · JPL
481939	2009 BL_{186}	—	January 18, 2009	Kitt Peak	Spacewatch	·	1.4 km	MPC · JPL
481940	2009 BS_{187}	—	January 31, 2009	Mount Lemmon	Mount Lemmon Survey	MAR	910 m	MPC · JPL
481941	2009 BZ_{188}	—	October 19, 2008	Kitt Peak	Spacewatch	·	1.6 km	MPC · JPL
481942	2009 CB_{4}	—	January 28, 2009	Catalina	CSS	·	1.1 km	MPC · JPL
481943	2009 CH_{15}	—	February 3, 2009	Kitt Peak	Spacewatch	H	500 m	MPC · JPL
481944	2009 CM_{28}	—	February 1, 2009	Kitt Peak	Spacewatch	·	1.4 km	MPC · JPL
481945	2009 CL_{49}	—	February 14, 2009	Mount Lemmon	Mount Lemmon Survey	·	1.7 km	MPC · JPL
481946	2009 CM_{50}	—	February 14, 2009	La Sagra	OAM	H	550 m	MPC · JPL
481947	2009 CC_{59}	—	February 5, 2009	Mount Lemmon	Mount Lemmon Survey	·	1.7 km	MPC · JPL
481948	2009 CQ_{61}	—	February 3, 2009	Kitt Peak	Spacewatch	·	1 km	MPC · JPL
481949	2009 DV_{9}	—	February 19, 2009	La Sagra	OAM	H	520 m	MPC · JPL
481950	2009 DC_{14}	—	February 16, 2009	Kitt Peak	Spacewatch	·	1.2 km	MPC · JPL
481951	2009 DU_{49}	—	January 31, 2009	Mount Lemmon	Mount Lemmon Survey	·	1.5 km	MPC · JPL
481952	2009 DF_{75}	—	February 19, 2009	Catalina	CSS	·	1.6 km	MPC · JPL
481953	2009 DF_{84}	—	February 26, 2009	Kitt Peak	Spacewatch	·	1.2 km	MPC · JPL
481954	2009 DX_{86}	—	March 8, 2005	Mount Lemmon	Mount Lemmon Survey	(5)	900 m	MPC · JPL
481955	2009 DA_{98}	—	July 21, 2006	Mount Lemmon	Mount Lemmon Survey	ADE	2.7 km	MPC · JPL
481956	2009 DZ_{110}	—	January 29, 2009	Catalina	CSS	EUN	1.3 km	MPC · JPL
481957	2009 DS_{115}	—	February 4, 2009	Mount Lemmon	Mount Lemmon Survey	·	2.1 km	MPC · JPL
481958	2009 DY_{115}	—	February 27, 2009	Kitt Peak	Spacewatch	(5)	1.0 km	MPC · JPL
481959	2009 DM_{117}	—	February 27, 2009	Kitt Peak	Spacewatch	(5)	1.1 km	MPC · JPL
481960	2009 DL_{123}	—	February 24, 2009	Catalina	CSS	H	640 m	MPC · JPL
481961	2009 DS_{136}	—	February 24, 2009	Catalina	CSS	RAF	1.1 km	MPC · JPL
481962	2009 DN_{139}	—	February 28, 2009	Kitt Peak	Spacewatch	·	1.4 km	MPC · JPL
481963	2009 DM_{141}	—	September 14, 2007	Mount Lemmon	Mount Lemmon Survey	·	990 m	MPC · JPL
481964	2009 DU_{141}	—	February 28, 2009	Kitt Peak	Spacewatch	·	2.0 km	MPC · JPL
481965	2009 EB_{1}	—	March 2, 2009	Mount Lemmon	Mount Lemmon Survey	APO	260 m	MPC · JPL
481966	2009 EV_{6}	—	March 2, 2009	Mount Lemmon	Mount Lemmon Survey	·	1.1 km	MPC · JPL
481967	2009 EO_{9}	—	March 1, 2009	Kitt Peak	Spacewatch	·	1.0 km	MPC · JPL
481968	2009 ED_{19}	—	January 25, 2009	Kitt Peak	Spacewatch	·	1.1 km	MPC · JPL
481969	2009 EM_{20}	—	March 15, 2009	La Sagra	OAM	·	2.4 km	MPC · JPL
481970	2009 EV_{29}	—	January 20, 2009	Mount Lemmon	Mount Lemmon Survey	EUN	1.3 km	MPC · JPL
481971	2009 FH_{5}	—	February 28, 2009	Kitt Peak	Spacewatch	·	940 m	MPC · JPL
481972	2009 FG_{20}	—	January 19, 2009	Mount Lemmon	Mount Lemmon Survey	·	980 m	MPC · JPL
481973	2009 FP_{22}	—	March 2, 2009	Mount Lemmon	Mount Lemmon Survey	·	1.9 km	MPC · JPL
481974	2009 FY_{36}	—	March 1, 2009	Kitt Peak	Spacewatch	·	1.4 km	MPC · JPL
481975	2009 FS_{63}	—	March 29, 2009	Kitt Peak	Spacewatch	·	1.6 km	MPC · JPL
481976	2009 FQ_{64}	—	March 31, 2009	Kitt Peak	Spacewatch	·	1.5 km	MPC · JPL
481977	2009 FG_{66}	—	March 21, 2009	Kitt Peak	Spacewatch	·	2.1 km	MPC · JPL
481978	2009 FY_{66}	—	March 30, 2009	Mount Lemmon	Mount Lemmon Survey	·	1.9 km	MPC · JPL
481979	2009 GX_{1}	—	April 12, 2009	Altschwendt	W. Ries	·	1.1 km	MPC · JPL
481980	2009 HL_{47}	—	April 19, 2009	Kitt Peak	Spacewatch	WIT	1.0 km	MPC · JPL
481981	2009 HA_{50}	—	April 21, 2009	Kitt Peak	Spacewatch	(5)	1.1 km	MPC · JPL
481982	2009 HT_{82}	—	April 24, 2009	Mount Lemmon	Mount Lemmon Survey	·	2.1 km	MPC · JPL
481983	2009 HR_{105}	—	April 27, 2009	Kitt Peak	Spacewatch	·	1.5 km	MPC · JPL
481984 Cernunnos	2009 KL_{2}	Cernunnos	May 20, 2009	Vicques	M. Ory	AMO +1km	890 m	MPC · JPL
481985	2009 KM_{7}	—	May 26, 2009	Kitt Peak	Spacewatch	AMO +1km	960 m	MPC · JPL
481986	2009 KF_{33}	—	October 29, 2005	Catalina	CSS	·	2.0 km	MPC · JPL
481987	2009 MY_{1}	—	May 26, 2009	Mount Lemmon	Mount Lemmon Survey	L5	10 km	MPC · JPL
481988	2009 PS_{10}	—	July 28, 2009	Catalina	CSS	·	640 m	MPC · JPL
481989	2009 QB_{35}	—	August 28, 2009	Socorro	LINEAR	AMO	370 m	MPC · JPL
481990	2009 QU_{40}	—	August 15, 2009	Kitt Peak	Spacewatch	·	3.9 km	MPC · JPL
481991	2009 QX_{60}	—	August 26, 2009	La Sagra	OAM	·	630 m	MPC · JPL
481992	2009 RY_{11}	—	September 12, 2009	Kitt Peak	Spacewatch	·	590 m	MPC · JPL
481993 Melaniezander	2009 RO_{27}	Melaniezander	September 13, 2009	ESA OGS	Busch, M., Kresken, R.	·	700 m	MPC · JPL
481994	2009 RY_{75}	—	September 14, 2009	Catalina	CSS	·	670 m	MPC · JPL
481995	2009 SZ_{22}	—	September 16, 2009	Kitt Peak	Spacewatch	·	4.1 km	MPC · JPL
481996	2009 SD_{51}	—	August 19, 2009	Kitt Peak	Spacewatch	·	600 m	MPC · JPL
481997	2009 SK_{66}	—	September 17, 2009	Kitt Peak	Spacewatch	·	1.3 km	MPC · JPL
481998	2009 SQ_{70}	—	February 23, 2007	Mount Lemmon	Mount Lemmon Survey	·	560 m	MPC · JPL
481999	2009 SD_{74}	—	September 17, 2009	Kitt Peak	Spacewatch	·	600 m	MPC · JPL
482000	2009 SO_{115}	—	November 17, 2006	Kitt Peak	Spacewatch	·	740 m	MPC · JPL

back to top

== Meaning of names ==
As minor planet discoveries are confirmed, they are given a permanent number by the IAU's Minor Planet Center (MPC), and the discoverers can then submit names for them, following the IAU's naming conventions. The list below concerns those minor planets in the specified number-range that have received names, and explains the meanings of those names.

Official naming citations of newly named small Solar System bodies are approved and published in a bulletin by IAU's Working Group for Small Bodies Nomenclature (WGSBN). Before May 2021, citations were published in MPC's Minor Planet Circulars for many decades. Recent citations can also be found on the JPL Small-Body Database (SBDB). Until his death in 2016, German astronomer Lutz D. Schmadel compiled these citations into the Dictionary of Minor Planet Names (DMP) and regularly updated the collection.

Based on Paul Herget's The Names of the Minor Planets, Schmadel also researched the unclear origin of numerous asteroids, most of which had been named prior to World War II. This article incorporates text from this source, which is in the public domain: SBDB New namings may only be added to this list below after official publication as the preannouncement of names is condemned. The WGSBN publishes a comprehensive guideline for the naming rules of non-cometary small Solar System bodies.

Named minor planet	Provisional	This minor planet was named for...	Ref · Catalog
481984 Cernunnos	2009 KL_{2}	Cernunnos, the horned god and incarnation of fertility, life and the underworld in Celtic polytheism.	JPL · 481984
481993 Melaniezander	2009 RO_{27}	Melanie Zander (born 1970) is a German actress who had three decades of amateur stage performances. She worked at the European Space Agency until 2016.	JPL · 481993
