= (481394) 2006 SF6 =

Near-Earth asteroid

(481394) 2006 SF_{6}
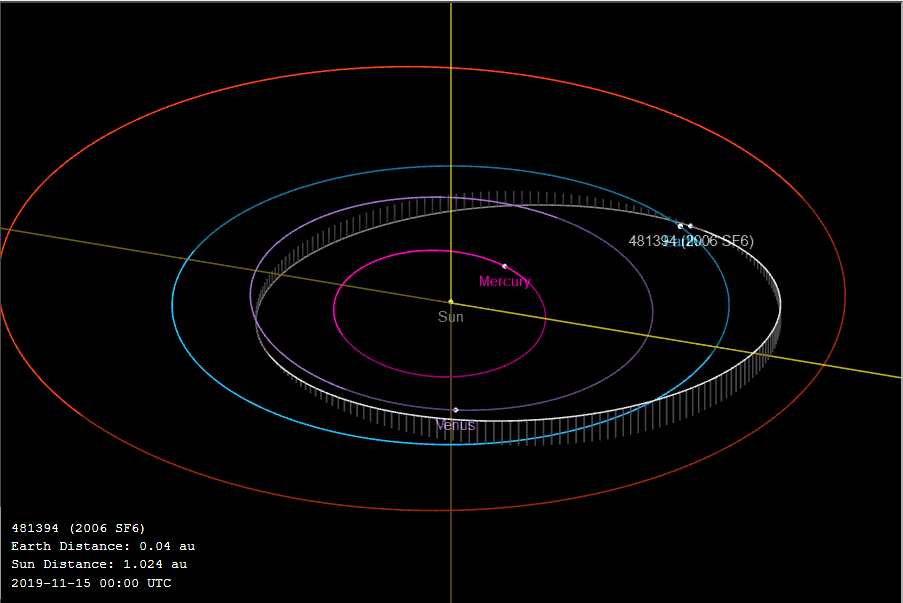
- Orbital diagram of 2006 SF_{6}

Discovery
- Discovered by: CSS
- Discovery site: Catalina Stn.
- Discovery date: 17 September 2006

Designations
- Minor planet category: NEO · Aten · PHA

Orbital characteristics
- Epoch 27 April 2019 (JD 2458600.5)
- Uncertainty parameter 0 · 1
- Observation arc: 13.17 yr (4,811 d)
- Aphelion: 1.2156 AU
- Perihelion: 0.6831 AU
- Semi-major axis: 0.9494 AU
- Eccentricity: 0.2805
- Orbital period (sidereal): 338 days
- Mean anomaly: 52.919°
- Mean motion: 1° 3^{m} 55.8^{s} / day
- Inclination: 5.8660°
- Longitude of ascending node: 228.06°
- Argument of perihelion: 305.66°
- Earth MOID: 0.0191 AU (7.4 LD)

Physical characteristics
- Mean diameter: 0.3 km (est. at 0.21)
- Synodic rotation period: 11.517 h
- Geometric albedo: 0.21±0.15
- Spectral type: A/S
- Absolute magnitude (H): 19.9

(481394) 2006 SF_{6} is a sub-kilometer near-Earth object and potentially hazardous asteroid of the Aten group, approximately 300 meters (1,000 feet) in diameter. It was discovered on 17 September 2006, by the Catalina Sky Survey at Catalina Station in Arizona. On 21 November 2019, it passed Earth at a distance of 11 lunar distances (0.0288 AU), which is the object's closest flyby for centuries. The stony A/S-type asteroid is highly elongated in shape and has a rotation period of 11.5 hours.

== Orbit and classification ==
2006 SF_{6} orbits the Sun at a distance of 0.7–1.2 AU once every 11 months (338 days; semi-major axis of 0.95 AU). Its orbit has an eccentricity of 0.28 and an inclination of 6° with respect to the ecliptic. The body's observation arc begins with its official discovery observation at Catalina Station in September 2006.

=== Close approaches ===
Being a potentially hazardous asteroid, 2006 SF_{6} has an Earth minimum orbital intersection distance (MOID) of 0.0191 AU (2,860,000 km) which corresponds to 7.4 lunar distances. In order to be classified as "potentially hazardous" an object must have an Earth-MOID of less than 0.05 AU (7,500,000 km; 4,600,000 mi) – approximately 19.5 lunar distances – and an absolute magnitude brighter than 22, approximately corresponding to a diameter above 140 meters (460 ft).

On 21 November 2019 at 00:01 UTC, it passed Earth at a nominal distance (measured from the center of the Earth) of 11 lunar distances (0.0288 AU) and at a relative velocity of 7.9 km/h. This is the object's closest flyby in JPL's data base, which covers 183 approaches over almost three centuries from April 1900 to November 2198.

On 19 November 2069, it will pass 0.0393 AU (5,880,000 km) from Earth, which will be the asteroid's second closest approach after its record flyby on 21 November 2019.

== Numbering and naming ==
This minor planet was numbered by the Minor Planet Center on 12 January 2017 (M.P.C. 102964). As of 2020 it has not been named.

== Physical characteristics ==
During its apparition in November 2007, spectro-photometric data obtained of 2006 SF_{6} allowed for an A/S/D-type classification. This classification could be further constrained to an A/S-type, as a D-type does not agree with the object's relatively high albedo value (see below).

=== Rotation period ===
In September 2018, a rotational lightcurve of 2006 SF_{6} was obtained from photometric observations by Brian Warner and Robert Stephens at the Center for Solar System Studies in California. Lightcurve analysis gave a rotation period of 11.517±0.006 hours with a very high brightness amplitude of 0.97±0.04 magnitude (U=3), indicative of a highly elongated non-spherical shape. The two photometrists revisited the object in October 2019 and obtained a similar result of 11.495±0.002 hours with an even higher magnitude of 1.07±0.03 (U=3-).

=== Diameter and albedo ===
According to the NEOSurvey carried out by NASA's Spitzer Space Telescope, the asteroid's surface has an albedo of 0.21±0.15, which gives a mean-diameter of roughly 300 meters based on an absolute magnitude of 19.9. The Collaborative Asteroid Lightcurve Link assumes an albedo of 0.20 and a diameter of 0.311 kilometers using an absolute magnitude of 19.9 as well.
