= List of minor planets: 613001–614000 =

The following is a partial list of minor planets, running from minor-planet number 613001 through 614000, inclusive. The primary data for this and other partial lists is based on JPL's "Small-Body Orbital Elements" and data available from the Minor Planet Center. Critical list information is also provided by the MPC, unless otherwise specified from Lowell Observatory. A detailed description of the table's columns and additional sources are given on the main page including a complete list of every page in this series, and a statistical break-up on the dynamical classification of minor planets.

Also see the summary list of all named bodies in numerical and alphabetical order, and the corresponding naming citations for the number range of this particular list. New namings may only be added to this list after official publication, as the preannouncement of names is condemned by the Working Group for Small Bodies Nomenclature of the International Astronomical Union.

Near-Earth obj.	MBA (inner)	MBA (outer)	Centaur
Mars-crosser	MBA (middle)	Jupiter trojan	Trans-Neptunian obj.
Unclassified

== 613001–613100 ==
Designation			Discovery			Properties		Ref
Permanent	Provisional	Named after	Date	Site	Discoverer(s)	Category	Diam.	Ref
613001	2005 NT_{46}	—	July 6, 2005	Kitt Peak	Spacewatch	·	720 m	MPC · JPL
613002	2005 NA_{56}	—	July 5, 2005	Mount Lemmon	Mount Lemmon Survey	T_{j} (2.98)	1.7 km	MPC · JPL
613003	2005 NN_{59}	—	July 9, 2005	Kitt Peak	Spacewatch	·	600 m	MPC · JPL
613004	2005 NZ_{59}	—	July 9, 2005	Kitt Peak	Spacewatch	·	550 m	MPC · JPL
613005	2005 NS_{74}	—	July 9, 2005	Kitt Peak	Spacewatch	·	420 m	MPC · JPL
613006	2005 NJ_{76}	—	July 10, 2005	Kitt Peak	Spacewatch	·	560 m	MPC · JPL
613007	2005 NU_{89}	—	July 4, 2005	Kitt Peak	Spacewatch	T_{j} (2.95)	2.7 km	MPC · JPL
613008	2005 NA_{95}	—	July 6, 2005	Kitt Peak	Spacewatch	T_{j} (2.98) · 3:2	3.6 km	MPC · JPL
613009	2005 NS_{122}	—	July 3, 2005	Palomar	NEAT	·	1.7 km	MPC · JPL
613010	2005 OU_{1}	—	July 27, 2005	Palomar	NEAT	ATE · critical	320 m	MPC · JPL
613011	2005 OO_{16}	—	July 29, 2005	Palomar	NEAT	·	1.5 km	MPC · JPL
613012	2005 ON_{23}	—	July 30, 2005	Palomar	NEAT	·	3.0 km	MPC · JPL
613013	2005 PF_{5}	—	August 7, 2005	Reedy Creek	J. Broughton	·	3.1 km	MPC · JPL
613014	2005 QS_{10}	—	August 27, 2005	Anderson Mesa	LONEOS	AMO	610 m	MPC · JPL
613015	2005 QH_{16}	—	August 25, 2005	Palomar	NEAT	·	1.3 km	MPC · JPL
613016	2005 QP_{30}	—	August 29, 2005	Saint-Sulpice	B. Christophe	·	1.7 km	MPC · JPL
613017	2005 QJ_{57}	—	August 29, 2005	Vicques	Vicques	NYS	910 m	MPC · JPL
613018	2005 QG_{83}	—	August 29, 2005	Anderson Mesa	LONEOS	PHO	1.8 km	MPC · JPL
613019	2005 QD_{105}	—	August 27, 2005	Palomar	NEAT	·	840 m	MPC · JPL
613020	2005 QG_{118}	—	August 28, 2005	Kitt Peak	Spacewatch	NYS	1.0 km	MPC · JPL
613021	2005 QX_{119}	—	August 28, 2005	Kitt Peak	Spacewatch	·	1.5 km	MPC · JPL
613022	2005 QB_{121}	—	August 28, 2005	Kitt Peak	Spacewatch	·	620 m	MPC · JPL
613023	2005 QY_{123}	—	August 28, 2005	Kitt Peak	Spacewatch	THM	1.9 km	MPC · JPL
613024	2005 QD_{125}	—	August 28, 2005	Kitt Peak	Spacewatch	·	1.6 km	MPC · JPL
613025	2005 QE_{130}	—	August 28, 2005	Kitt Peak	Spacewatch	NYS	660 m	MPC · JPL
613026	2005 QA_{134}	—	August 28, 2005	Kitt Peak	Spacewatch	·	720 m	MPC · JPL
613027	2005 QT_{136}	—	August 28, 2005	Kitt Peak	Spacewatch	·	710 m	MPC · JPL
613028	2005 QC_{172}	—	August 29, 2005	Palomar	NEAT	·	1.1 km	MPC · JPL
613029	2005 QX_{181}	—	August 31, 2005	Socorro	LINEAR	EUN	1.3 km	MPC · JPL
613030	2005 QZ_{186}	—	August 27, 2005	Palomar	NEAT	·	1.3 km	MPC · JPL
613031	2005 RD_{4}	—	September 3, 2005	Bergisch Gladbach	W. Bickel	T_{j} (2.98)	3.0 km	MPC · JPL
613032	2005 RU_{14}	—	September 1, 2005	Kitt Peak	Spacewatch	·	730 m	MPC · JPL
613033	2005 RL_{19}	—	September 1, 2005	Kitt Peak	Spacewatch	NYS	1.0 km	MPC · JPL
613034	2005 RX_{19}	—	September 1, 2005	Kitt Peak	Spacewatch	3:2	4.4 km	MPC · JPL
613035	2005 RK_{21}	—	September 3, 2005	Palomar	NEAT	·	1.3 km	MPC · JPL
613036	2005 RQ_{33}	—	September 12, 2005	Junk Bond	D. Healy	DOR	1.6 km	MPC · JPL
613037	2005 RP_{43}	—	September 3, 2005	Apache Point	Apache Point	res · 2:11	232 km	MPC · JPL
613038	2005 RL_{51}	—	September 13, 2005	Kitt Peak	Spacewatch	·	340 m	MPC · JPL
613039	2005 SH	—	September 21, 2005	Marly	Observatoire Naef	·	930 m	MPC · JPL
613040	2005 SW_{1}	—	September 24, 2005	Mount Graham	Ryan, W. H., Martinez, C. T.	·	980 m	MPC · JPL
613041	2005 SD_{2}	—	September 22, 2005	Palomar	NEAT	·	680 m	MPC · JPL
613042	2005 SV_{6}	—	September 23, 2005	Kitt Peak	Spacewatch	·	1.5 km	MPC · JPL
613043	2005 SC_{7}	—	September 24, 2005	Kitt Peak	Spacewatch	EOS	1.4 km	MPC · JPL
613044	2005 SL_{7}	—	September 24, 2005	Kitt Peak	Spacewatch	MAS	460 m	MPC · JPL
613045	2005 SV_{16}	—	September 26, 2005	Kitt Peak	Spacewatch	·	2.2 km	MPC · JPL
613046	2005 SS_{17}	—	September 26, 2005	Kitt Peak	Spacewatch	·	1.7 km	MPC · JPL
613047	2005 SZ_{27}	—	September 23, 2005	Kitt Peak	Spacewatch	·	860 m	MPC · JPL
613048	2005 SO_{30}	—	September 23, 2005	Kitt Peak	Spacewatch	(5)	780 m	MPC · JPL
613049	2005 SL_{45}	—	September 24, 2005	Kitt Peak	Spacewatch	PHO	1.0 km	MPC · JPL
613050	2005 SX_{47}	—	September 24, 2005	Kitt Peak	Spacewatch	·	1.4 km	MPC · JPL
613051	2005 SC_{58}	—	September 26, 2005	Kitt Peak	Spacewatch	MAS	520 m	MPC · JPL
613052	2005 SL_{67}	—	September 27, 2005	Kitt Peak	Spacewatch	V	410 m	MPC · JPL
613053	2005 SC_{81}	—	September 24, 2005	Kitt Peak	Spacewatch	·	570 m	MPC · JPL
613054	2005 SM_{83}	—	September 24, 2005	Kitt Peak	Spacewatch	·	550 m	MPC · JPL
613055	2005 SC_{90}	—	September 24, 2005	Kitt Peak	Spacewatch	·	1.0 km	MPC · JPL
613056	2005 SF_{91}	—	September 24, 2005	Kitt Peak	Spacewatch	·	1.6 km	MPC · JPL
613057	2005 SU_{95}	—	September 25, 2005	Kitt Peak	Spacewatch	·	1.6 km	MPC · JPL
613058	2005 SS_{96}	—	September 25, 2005	Palomar	NEAT	·	1.5 km	MPC · JPL
613059	2005 SO_{100}	—	September 25, 2005	Kitt Peak	Spacewatch	·	2.9 km	MPC · JPL
613060	2005 SR_{100}	—	September 25, 2005	Kitt Peak	Spacewatch	·	2.0 km	MPC · JPL
613061	2005 SU_{103}	—	September 25, 2005	Palomar	NEAT	·	2.3 km	MPC · JPL
613062	2005 SX_{110}	—	September 26, 2005	Kitt Peak	Spacewatch	·	1.3 km	MPC · JPL
613063	2005 SG_{115}	—	September 27, 2005	Kitt Peak	Spacewatch	·	570 m	MPC · JPL
613064	2005 SE_{119}	—	September 28, 2005	Palomar	NEAT	BAR	1.1 km	MPC · JPL
613065	2005 ST_{120}	—	September 29, 2005	Kitt Peak	Spacewatch	·	1.3 km	MPC · JPL
613066	2005 ST_{128}	—	September 29, 2005	Anderson Mesa	LONEOS	·	900 m	MPC · JPL
613067	2005 SN_{134}	—	September 30, 2005	Catalina	CSS	·	2.2 km	MPC · JPL
613068	2005 SK_{136}	—	September 24, 2005	Kitt Peak	Spacewatch	·	1.2 km	MPC · JPL
613069	2005 SV_{136}	—	September 24, 2005	Kitt Peak	Spacewatch	·	2.7 km	MPC · JPL
613070	2005 SH_{149}	—	September 25, 2005	Kitt Peak	Spacewatch	·	3.5 km	MPC · JPL
613071	2005 SR_{150}	—	September 25, 2005	Kitt Peak	Spacewatch	GEF	1.1 km	MPC · JPL
613072	2005 SB_{156}	—	September 26, 2005	Kitt Peak	Spacewatch	·	2.4 km	MPC · JPL
613073	2005 SS_{157}	—	September 26, 2005	Kitt Peak	Spacewatch	·	1.3 km	MPC · JPL
613074	2005 SE_{158}	—	September 26, 2005	Palomar	NEAT	·	2.5 km	MPC · JPL
613075	2005 SE_{172}	—	September 29, 2005	Kitt Peak	Spacewatch	·	800 m	MPC · JPL
613076	2005 SV_{183}	—	September 29, 2005	Kitt Peak	Spacewatch	·	1.2 km	MPC · JPL
613077	2005 SE_{186}	—	September 29, 2005	Mount Lemmon	Mount Lemmon Survey	·	1.3 km	MPC · JPL
613078	2005 SY_{189}	—	September 29, 2005	Mount Lemmon	Mount Lemmon Survey	·	390 m	MPC · JPL
613079	2005 SS_{192}	—	September 29, 2005	Mount Lemmon	Mount Lemmon Survey	·	500 m	MPC · JPL
613080	2005 SA_{230}	—	September 30, 2005	Mount Lemmon	Mount Lemmon Survey	·	1.5 km	MPC · JPL
613081	2005 SF_{230}	—	September 30, 2005	Mount Lemmon	Mount Lemmon Survey	·	760 m	MPC · JPL
613082	2005 SQ_{242}	—	September 30, 2005	Kitt Peak	Spacewatch	·	700 m	MPC · JPL
613083	2005 SJ_{244}	—	September 30, 2005	Mount Lemmon	Mount Lemmon Survey	·	710 m	MPC · JPL
613084	2005 SJ_{263}	—	September 23, 2005	Kitt Peak	Spacewatch	·	810 m	MPC · JPL
613085	2005 SO_{264}	—	September 25, 2005	Kitt Peak	Spacewatch	MAS	440 m	MPC · JPL
613086	2005 SC_{273}	—	September 30, 2005	Kitt Peak	Spacewatch	·	700 m	MPC · JPL
613087	2005 SE_{278}	—	September 26, 2005	Apache Point	Apache Point	res · 3:5	141 km	MPC · JPL
613088	2005 SU_{279}	—	September 23, 2005	Kitt Peak	Spacewatch	THM	2.1 km	MPC · JPL
613089	2005 SS_{283}	—	September 21, 2005	Apache Point	A. C. Becker	·	1.7 km	MPC · JPL
613090	2005 SY_{283}	—	September 24, 2005	Apache Point	A. C. Becker	·	1.1 km	MPC · JPL
613091	2005 SB_{288}	—	September 26, 2005	Apache Point	A. C. Becker	·	1.4 km	MPC · JPL
613092	2005 SZ_{289}	—	September 26, 2005	Kitt Peak	Spacewatch	·	1.8 km	MPC · JPL
613093	2005 TL_{32}	—	October 1, 2005	Kitt Peak	Spacewatch	·	660 m	MPC · JPL
613094	2005 TC_{34}	—	October 1, 2005	Kitt Peak	Spacewatch	·	810 m	MPC · JPL
613095	2005 TL_{43}	—	October 5, 2005	Socorro	LINEAR	·	1.6 km	MPC · JPL
613096	2005 TR_{45}	—	October 7, 2005	Socorro	LINEAR	AMO	580 m	MPC · JPL
613097	2005 TZ_{47}	—	October 6, 2005	Kitt Peak	Spacewatch	·	800 m	MPC · JPL
613098	2005 TW_{60}	—	October 3, 2005	Kitt Peak	Spacewatch	·	1.9 km	MPC · JPL
613099	2005 TH_{70}	—	October 6, 2005	Mount Lemmon	Mount Lemmon Survey	·	850 m	MPC · JPL
613100	2005 TN_{74}	—	October 8, 2005	Las Campanas	C. A. Trujillo, S. S. Sheppard	res · 3:5	118 km	MPC · JPL

== 613101–613200 ==
back to top

Designation			Discovery			Properties		Ref
Permanent	Provisional	Named after	Date	Site	Discoverer(s)	Category	Diam.	Ref
613101	2005 TN_{86}	—	October 5, 2005	Kitt Peak	Spacewatch	·	1.5 km	MPC · JPL
613102	2005 TF_{89}	—	October 5, 2005	Mount Lemmon	Mount Lemmon Survey	·	780 m	MPC · JPL
613103	2005 TB_{103}	—	October 7, 2005	Kitt Peak	Spacewatch	·	1 km	MPC · JPL
613104	2005 TN_{110}	—	October 7, 2005	Kitt Peak	Spacewatch	V	360 m	MPC · JPL
613105	2005 TO_{112}	—	October 7, 2005	Kitt Peak	Spacewatch	·	1.1 km	MPC · JPL
613106	2005 TR_{113}	—	October 7, 2005	Kitt Peak	Spacewatch	·	1.3 km	MPC · JPL
613107	2005 TB_{118}	—	October 7, 2005	Kitt Peak	Spacewatch	·	1.6 km	MPC · JPL
613108	2005 TE_{120}	—	October 7, 2005	Kitt Peak	Spacewatch	·	1.4 km	MPC · JPL
613109	2005 TX_{124}	—	October 7, 2005	Kitt Peak	Spacewatch	·	1.0 km	MPC · JPL
613110	2005 TL_{125}	—	October 7, 2005	Kitt Peak	Spacewatch	·	840 m	MPC · JPL
613111	2005 TY_{128}	—	October 7, 2005	Kitt Peak	Spacewatch	·	670 m	MPC · JPL
613112	2005 TM_{138}	—	October 7, 2005	Catalina	CSS	·	640 m	MPC · JPL
613113	2005 TZ_{150}	—	October 8, 2005	Kitt Peak	Spacewatch	(29841)	1.1 km	MPC · JPL
613114	2005 TK_{157}	—	October 9, 2005	Kitt Peak	Spacewatch	·	900 m	MPC · JPL
613115	2005 TB_{173}	—	October 13, 2005	Socorro	LINEAR	T_{j} (2.91)	3.7 km	MPC · JPL
613116	2005 TC_{193}	—	October 11, 2005	Apache Point	A. C. Becker	·	1.1 km	MPC · JPL
613117	2005 TA_{197}	—	October 9, 2005	Kitt Peak	Spacewatch	·	750 m	MPC · JPL
613118	2005 UV_{1}	—	October 22, 2005	Junk Bond	D. Healy	·	1.2 km	MPC · JPL
613119	2005 UA_{7}	—	October 22, 2005	Great Shefford	Birtwhistle, P.	·	1.8 km	MPC · JPL
613120	2005 UX_{37}	—	October 24, 2005	Kitt Peak	Spacewatch	·	740 m	MPC · JPL
613121	2005 UL_{39}	—	October 24, 2005	Kitt Peak	Spacewatch	MAS	490 m	MPC · JPL
613122	2005 UJ_{43}	—	October 22, 2005	Kitt Peak	Spacewatch	·	1.2 km	MPC · JPL
613123	2005 UR_{44}	—	October 22, 2005	Kitt Peak	Spacewatch	DOR	1.6 km	MPC · JPL
613124	2005 UO_{45}	—	October 22, 2005	Catalina	CSS	·	790 m	MPC · JPL
613125	2005 UB_{47}	—	October 22, 2005	Kitt Peak	Spacewatch	NYS	990 m	MPC · JPL
613126	2005 UV_{49}	—	October 23, 2005	Catalina	CSS	·	1.2 km	MPC · JPL
613127	2005 UN_{74}	—	October 23, 2005	Palomar	NEAT	·	2.8 km	MPC · JPL
613128	2005 UD_{84}	—	October 22, 2005	Kitt Peak	Spacewatch	·	1.7 km	MPC · JPL
613129	2005 UW_{91}	—	October 22, 2005	Kitt Peak	Spacewatch	·	1.2 km	MPC · JPL
613130	2005 UK_{92}	—	October 22, 2005	Kitt Peak	Spacewatch	·	1.4 km	MPC · JPL
613131	2005 UO_{92}	—	October 22, 2005	Kitt Peak	Spacewatch	PHO	760 m	MPC · JPL
613132	2005 UD_{104}	—	October 22, 2005	Kitt Peak	Spacewatch	·	3.0 km	MPC · JPL
613133	2005 UE_{104}	—	October 22, 2005	Kitt Peak	Spacewatch	·	2.3 km	MPC · JPL
613134	2005 UO_{118}	—	October 24, 2005	Kitt Peak	Spacewatch	·	820 m	MPC · JPL
613135	2005 UD_{131}	—	October 24, 2005	Kitt Peak	Spacewatch	·	1.6 km	MPC · JPL
613136	2005 UW_{133}	—	October 25, 2005	Kitt Peak	Spacewatch	·	1.5 km	MPC · JPL
613137	2005 UF_{136}	—	October 25, 2005	Mount Lemmon	Mount Lemmon Survey	·	1.7 km	MPC · JPL
613138	2005 UV_{136}	—	October 25, 2005	Mount Lemmon	Mount Lemmon Survey	·	1.2 km	MPC · JPL
613139	2005 UP_{139}	—	October 25, 2005	Mount Lemmon	Mount Lemmon Survey	MAS	510 m	MPC · JPL
613140	2005 UD_{151}	—	October 26, 2005	Kitt Peak	Spacewatch	·	2.0 km	MPC · JPL
613141	2005 UH_{156}	—	October 26, 2005	Palomar	NEAT	·	1.1 km	MPC · JPL
613142	2005 UR_{158}	—	October 25, 2005	Mount Lemmon	Mount Lemmon Survey	·	1.5 km	MPC · JPL
613143	2005 UV_{164}	—	October 24, 2005	Kitt Peak	Spacewatch	MAS	510 m	MPC · JPL
613144	2005 UY_{169}	—	October 24, 2005	Kitt Peak	Spacewatch	·	850 m	MPC · JPL
613145	2005 UT_{170}	—	October 24, 2005	Kitt Peak	Spacewatch	(5)	1.4 km	MPC · JPL
613146	2005 UB_{171}	—	October 24, 2005	Kitt Peak	Spacewatch	·	1.4 km	MPC · JPL
613147	2005 UK_{178}	—	October 24, 2005	Kitt Peak	Spacewatch	RAF	650 m	MPC · JPL
613148	2005 UX_{183}	—	October 25, 2005	Mount Lemmon	Mount Lemmon Survey	·	1.8 km	MPC · JPL
613149	2005 UG_{184}	—	October 25, 2005	Mount Lemmon	Mount Lemmon Survey	critical	950 m	MPC · JPL
613150	2005 UD_{186}	—	October 25, 2005	Mount Lemmon	Mount Lemmon Survey	·	850 m	MPC · JPL
613151	2005 UW_{186}	—	October 26, 2005	Kitt Peak	Spacewatch	·	2.4 km	MPC · JPL
613152	2005 UF_{189}	—	October 27, 2005	Mount Lemmon	Mount Lemmon Survey	GEF	830 m	MPC · JPL
613153	2005 UC_{190}	—	October 27, 2005	Mount Lemmon	Mount Lemmon Survey	·	640 m	MPC · JPL
613154	2005 UX_{193}	—	October 22, 2005	Kitt Peak	Spacewatch	MAS	510 m	MPC · JPL
613155	2005 UB_{195}	—	October 22, 2005	Kitt Peak	Spacewatch	·	480 m	MPC · JPL
613156	2005 UA_{201}	—	October 25, 2005	Kitt Peak	Spacewatch	·	700 m	MPC · JPL
613157	2005 UY_{202}	—	October 25, 2005	Kitt Peak	Spacewatch	LUT	2.4 km	MPC · JPL
613158	2005 UO_{204}	—	October 25, 2005	Kitt Peak	Spacewatch	·	740 m	MPC · JPL
613159	2005 UT_{208}	—	October 27, 2005	Kitt Peak	Spacewatch	·	930 m	MPC · JPL
613160	2005 UG_{212}	—	October 27, 2005	Kitt Peak	Spacewatch	NYS	760 m	MPC · JPL
613161	2005 UK_{216}	—	October 25, 2005	Catalina	CSS	·	1.3 km	MPC · JPL
613162	2005 UP_{217}	—	October 22, 2005	Kitt Peak	Spacewatch	·	860 m	MPC · JPL
613163	2005 UN_{219}	—	October 25, 2005	Kitt Peak	Spacewatch	·	2.1 km	MPC · JPL
613164	2005 UC_{227}	—	October 25, 2005	Kitt Peak	Spacewatch	·	1.4 km	MPC · JPL
613165	2005 UV_{227}	—	October 25, 2005	Kitt Peak	Spacewatch	·	1.5 km	MPC · JPL
613166	2005 UU_{228}	—	October 25, 2005	Kitt Peak	Spacewatch	·	2.0 km	MPC · JPL
613167	2005 UD_{232}	—	October 25, 2005	Mount Lemmon	Mount Lemmon Survey	·	1.1 km	MPC · JPL
613168	2005 UC_{235}	—	October 25, 2005	Kitt Peak	Spacewatch	·	870 m	MPC · JPL
613169	2005 UL_{238}	—	October 25, 2005	Kitt Peak	Spacewatch	BAR	1.0 km	MPC · JPL
613170	2005 UP_{245}	—	October 26, 2005	Kitt Peak	Spacewatch	·	840 m	MPC · JPL
613171	2005 UM_{255}	—	October 24, 2005	Kitt Peak	Spacewatch	·	1.2 km	MPC · JPL
613172	2005 UD_{263}	—	October 27, 2005	Kitt Peak	Spacewatch	·	810 m	MPC · JPL
613173	2005 UG_{264}	—	October 27, 2005	Kitt Peak	Spacewatch	·	1.8 km	MPC · JPL
613174	2005 UO_{274}	—	October 26, 2005	Anderson Mesa	LONEOS	·	1.8 km	MPC · JPL
613175	2005 UU_{281}	—	October 25, 2005	Mount Lemmon	Mount Lemmon Survey	·	2.0 km	MPC · JPL
613176	2005 US_{282}	—	October 26, 2005	Kitt Peak	Spacewatch	MAS	550 m	MPC · JPL
613177	2005 UF_{284}	—	October 26, 2005	Kitt Peak	Spacewatch	·	3.4 km	MPC · JPL
613178	2005 UB_{287}	—	October 26, 2005	Kitt Peak	Spacewatch	·	1.8 km	MPC · JPL
613179	2005 UV_{298}	—	October 26, 2005	Kitt Peak	Spacewatch	MAS	520 m	MPC · JPL
613180	2005 UZ_{298}	—	October 26, 2005	Kitt Peak	Spacewatch	·	680 m	MPC · JPL
613181	2005 UM_{307}	—	October 27, 2005	Mount Lemmon	Mount Lemmon Survey	LIX	2.7 km	MPC · JPL
613182	2005 UA_{323}	—	October 28, 2005	Kitt Peak	Spacewatch	·	500 m	MPC · JPL
613183	2005 UD_{332}	—	October 29, 2005	Kitt Peak	Spacewatch	critical	1.9 km	MPC · JPL
613184	2005 UV_{335}	—	October 30, 2005	Kitt Peak	Spacewatch	LIX · critical	2.1 km	MPC · JPL
613185	2005 UW_{347}	—	October 31, 2005	Kitt Peak	Spacewatch	·	1.2 km	MPC · JPL
613186	2005 UM_{356}	—	October 30, 2005	Kitt Peak	Spacewatch	·	730 m	MPC · JPL
613187	2005 UD_{358}	—	October 24, 2005	Kitt Peak	Spacewatch	·	1.4 km	MPC · JPL
613188	2005 UA_{359}	—	October 25, 2005	Kitt Peak	Spacewatch	EUN	890 m	MPC · JPL
613189	2005 UC_{359}	—	October 25, 2005	Kitt Peak	Spacewatch	NYS	970 m	MPC · JPL
613190	2005 UP_{361}	—	October 27, 2005	Kitt Peak	Spacewatch	·	1.1 km	MPC · JPL
613191	2005 UY_{362}	—	October 27, 2005	Mount Lemmon	Mount Lemmon Survey	·	1.3 km	MPC · JPL
613192	2005 UE_{380}	—	October 29, 2005	Mount Lemmon	Mount Lemmon Survey	·	680 m	MPC · JPL
613193	2005 UR_{399}	—	October 25, 2005	Mount Lemmon	Mount Lemmon Survey	·	1.3 km	MPC · JPL
613194	2005 UV_{399}	—	October 25, 2005	Mount Lemmon	Mount Lemmon Survey	H	370 m	MPC · JPL
613195	2005 UY_{404}	—	October 29, 2005	Mount Lemmon	Mount Lemmon Survey	·	590 m	MPC · JPL
613196	2005 UG_{410}	—	October 31, 2005	Kitt Peak	Spacewatch	·	1.9 km	MPC · JPL
613197	2005 UG_{411}	—	October 31, 2005	Mount Lemmon	Mount Lemmon Survey	·	3.7 km	MPC · JPL
613198	2005 UN_{416}	—	October 25, 2005	Kitt Peak	Spacewatch	·	890 m	MPC · JPL
613199	2005 UE_{418}	—	October 25, 2005	Kitt Peak	Spacewatch	MAS	500 m	MPC · JPL
613200	2005 US_{418}	—	October 25, 2005	Kitt Peak	Spacewatch	·	940 m	MPC · JPL

== 613201–613300 ==
back to top

Designation			Discovery			Properties		Ref
Permanent	Provisional	Named after	Date	Site	Discoverer(s)	Category	Diam.	Ref
613201	2005 UH_{420}	—	October 25, 2005	Kitt Peak	Spacewatch	·	1.1 km	MPC · JPL
613202	2005 UJ_{420}	—	October 25, 2005	Kitt Peak	Spacewatch	KOR	950 m	MPC · JPL
613203	2005 UG_{436}	—	October 30, 2005	Kitt Peak	Spacewatch	·	2.7 km	MPC · JPL
613204	2005 UT_{453}	—	October 30, 2005	Kitt Peak	Spacewatch	·	2.1 km	MPC · JPL
613205	2005 UK_{463}	—	October 30, 2005	Kitt Peak	Spacewatch	NYS	790 m	MPC · JPL
613206	2005 UH_{475}	—	October 22, 2005	Kitt Peak	Spacewatch	EOS	1.4 km	MPC · JPL
613207	2005 UL_{484}	—	October 22, 2005	Palomar	NEAT	·	1.2 km	MPC · JPL
613208	2005 UA_{488}	—	October 23, 2005	Catalina	CSS	·	2.0 km	MPC · JPL
613209	2005 UO_{488}	—	October 23, 2005	Catalina	CSS	·	1.1 km	MPC · JPL
613210	2005 UV_{509}	—	October 22, 2005	Kitt Peak	Spacewatch	·	1.2 km	MPC · JPL
613211	2005 UT_{517}	—	October 25, 2005	Apache Point	A. C. Becker	TEL	1.0 km	MPC · JPL
613212	2005 UC_{519}	—	October 26, 2005	Apache Point	A. C. Becker	EOS	1.3 km	MPC · JPL
613213	2005 UB_{521}	—	October 26, 2005	Apache Point	A. C. Becker	·	900 m	MPC · JPL
613214	2005 UN_{524}	—	October 25, 2005	Mauna Kea	P. A. Wiegert	centaur	101 km	MPC · JPL
613215	2005 US_{526}	—	October 24, 2005	Kitt Peak	Spacewatch	·	500 m	MPC · JPL
613216	2005 UL_{529}	—	October 25, 2005	Mount Lemmon	Mount Lemmon Survey	·	1.7 km	MPC · JPL
613217	2005 VC_{2}	—	November 6, 2005	Catalina	CSS	T_{j} (2.83) · AMO +1km	1.1 km	MPC · JPL
613218	2005 VX_{8}	—	November 1, 2005	Kitt Peak	Spacewatch	·	840 m	MPC · JPL
613219	2005 VW_{15}	—	November 2, 2005	Socorro	LINEAR	·	1.3 km	MPC · JPL
613220	2005 VH_{29}	—	November 4, 2005	Mount Lemmon	Mount Lemmon Survey	MAS	520 m	MPC · JPL
613221	2005 VQ_{33}	—	November 2, 2005	Mount Lemmon	Mount Lemmon Survey	·	600 m	MPC · JPL
613222	2005 VT_{39}	—	November 4, 2005	Mount Lemmon	Mount Lemmon Survey	·	1.3 km	MPC · JPL
613223	2005 VK_{44}	—	November 3, 2005	Mount Lemmon	Mount Lemmon Survey	·	1.2 km	MPC · JPL
613224	2005 VS_{46}	—	November 5, 2005	Mount Lemmon	Mount Lemmon Survey	·	1.4 km	MPC · JPL
613225	2005 VO_{52}	—	November 3, 2005	Mount Lemmon	Mount Lemmon Survey	·	1.2 km	MPC · JPL
613226	2005 VM_{56}	—	November 4, 2005	Kitt Peak	Spacewatch	·	2.4 km	MPC · JPL
613227	2005 VR_{68}	—	November 1, 2005	Mount Lemmon	Mount Lemmon Survey	·	2.0 km	MPC · JPL
613228	2005 VO_{71}	—	November 1, 2005	Mount Lemmon	Mount Lemmon Survey	·	530 m	MPC · JPL
613229	2005 VM_{84}	—	November 4, 2005	Kitt Peak	Spacewatch	·	820 m	MPC · JPL
613230	2005 VY_{100}	—	November 1, 2005	Kitt Peak	Spacewatch	·	1.2 km	MPC · JPL
613231	2005 VH_{101}	—	November 2, 2005	Mount Lemmon	Mount Lemmon Survey	·	580 m	MPC · JPL
613232	2005 VL_{102}	—	November 1, 2005	Kitt Peak	Spacewatch	·	1.1 km	MPC · JPL
613233	2005 VS_{108}	—	November 6, 2005	Kitt Peak	Spacewatch	·	1.1 km	MPC · JPL
613234	2005 VP_{118}	—	November 1, 2005	Mauna Kea	D. J. Tholen	APO	580 m	MPC · JPL
613235	2005 VF_{126}	—	November 1, 2005	Apache Point	A. C. Becker	·	1.7 km	MPC · JPL
613236	2005 VO_{132}	—	November 1, 2005	Apache Point	A. C. Becker	·	1.4 km	MPC · JPL
613237	2005 VL_{135}	—	November 6, 2005	Kitt Peak	Spacewatch	·	2.0 km	MPC · JPL
613238	2005 WM_{4}	—	November 25, 2005	Mount Lemmon	Mount Lemmon Survey	·	710 m	MPC · JPL
613239	2005 WD_{7}	—	November 21, 2005	Kitt Peak	Spacewatch	·	670 m	MPC · JPL
613240	2005 WD_{19}	—	November 24, 2005	Palomar	NEAT	·	1.9 km	MPC · JPL
613241	2005 WH_{24}	—	November 21, 2005	Kitt Peak	Spacewatch	NYS	820 m	MPC · JPL
613242	2005 WB_{44}	—	November 21, 2005	Kitt Peak	Spacewatch	EOS	1.4 km	MPC · JPL
613243	2005 WY_{45}	—	November 22, 2005	Kitt Peak	Spacewatch	·	670 m	MPC · JPL
613244	2005 WL_{47}	—	November 25, 2005	Kitt Peak	Spacewatch	NYS	650 m	MPC · JPL
613245	2005 WG_{67}	—	November 22, 2005	Kitt Peak	Spacewatch	·	1.4 km	MPC · JPL
613246	2005 WZ_{70}	—	November 21, 2005	Palomar	NEAT	TIR	2.7 km	MPC · JPL
613247	2005 WV_{77}	—	November 25, 2005	Kitt Peak	Spacewatch	T_{j} (2.97) · EUP	2.8 km	MPC · JPL
613248	2005 WS_{96}	—	November 26, 2005	Kitt Peak	Spacewatch	MAS	610 m	MPC · JPL
613249	2005 WK_{108}	—	November 29, 2005	Mount Lemmon	Mount Lemmon Survey	·	520 m	MPC · JPL
613250	2005 WJ_{110}	—	November 30, 2005	Kitt Peak	Spacewatch	·	1.5 km	MPC · JPL
613251	2005 WL_{125}	—	November 25, 2005	Mount Lemmon	Mount Lemmon Survey	·	1.8 km	MPC · JPL
613252	2005 WP_{126}	—	November 25, 2005	Mount Lemmon	Mount Lemmon Survey	·	3.2 km	MPC · JPL
613253	2005 WT_{129}	—	November 25, 2005	Mount Lemmon	Mount Lemmon Survey	MAS	540 m	MPC · JPL
613254	2005 WS_{138}	—	November 26, 2005	Mount Lemmon	Mount Lemmon Survey	·	610 m	MPC · JPL
613255	2005 WH_{142}	—	November 29, 2005	Kitt Peak	Spacewatch	MAS	530 m	MPC · JPL
613256	2005 WS_{146}	—	November 25, 2005	Kitt Peak	Spacewatch	·	2.2 km	MPC · JPL
613257	2005 WO_{148}	—	November 26, 2005	Mount Lemmon	Mount Lemmon Survey	MAS	700 m	MPC · JPL
613258	2005 WP_{153}	—	November 29, 2005	Kitt Peak	Spacewatch	URS	2.8 km	MPC · JPL
613259	2005 WA_{156}	—	November 29, 2005	Palomar	NEAT	H	590 m	MPC · JPL
613260	2005 WT_{183}	—	November 28, 2005	Catalina	CSS	·	920 m	MPC · JPL
613261	2005 WM_{187}	—	November 29, 2005	Kitt Peak	Spacewatch	T_{j} (2.92)	3.6 km	MPC · JPL
613262	2005 XU_{19}	—	December 2, 2005	Kitt Peak	Spacewatch	KOR	1.2 km	MPC · JPL
613263	2005 XH_{25}	—	December 4, 2005	Kitt Peak	Spacewatch	NYS	610 m	MPC · JPL
613264	2005 XO_{48}	—	December 2, 2005	Mount Lemmon	Mount Lemmon Survey	·	600 m	MPC · JPL
613265	2005 XT_{50}	—	December 2, 2005	Kitt Peak	Spacewatch	(1298)	2.2 km	MPC · JPL
613266	2005 XQ_{51}	—	December 2, 2005	Kitt Peak	Spacewatch	·	1.4 km	MPC · JPL
613267	2005 XD_{66}	—	December 8, 2005	Socorro	LINEAR	·	1.8 km	MPC · JPL
613268	2005 XV_{69}	—	December 6, 2005	Kitt Peak	Spacewatch	·	560 m	MPC · JPL
613269	2005 XZ_{97}	—	December 1, 2005	Kitt Peak	M. W. Buie	·	2.3 km	MPC · JPL
613270	2005 XM_{108}	—	December 1, 2005	Kitt Peak	M. W. Buie	·	550 m	MPC · JPL
613271	2005 YF_{2}	—	December 21, 2005	Kitt Peak	Spacewatch	·	590 m	MPC · JPL
613272	2005 YP_{7}	—	December 22, 2005	Kitt Peak	Spacewatch	·	620 m	MPC · JPL
613273	2005 YO_{9}	—	December 21, 2005	Kitt Peak	Spacewatch	NYS	850 m	MPC · JPL
613274	2005 YL_{28}	—	December 22, 2005	Kitt Peak	Spacewatch	·	790 m	MPC · JPL
613275	2005 YD_{30}	—	December 25, 2005	Kitt Peak	Spacewatch	·	490 m	MPC · JPL
613276	2005 YN_{42}	—	December 24, 2005	Catalina	CSS	·	950 m	MPC · JPL
613277	2005 YN_{43}	—	December 24, 2005	Kitt Peak	Spacewatch	·	1.1 km	MPC · JPL
613278	2005 YM_{53}	—	December 22, 2005	Kitt Peak	Spacewatch	·	1.5 km	MPC · JPL
613279 Isaacmiguel	2005 YV_{53}	Isaacmiguel	December 24, 2005	La Cañada	Lacruz, J.	H	450 m	MPC · JPL
613280	2005 YQ_{54}	—	December 25, 2005	Mount Lemmon	Mount Lemmon Survey	·	600 m	MPC · JPL
613281	2005 YD_{67}	—	December 26, 2005	Kitt Peak	Spacewatch	·	3.3 km	MPC · JPL
613282	2005 YO_{67}	—	December 26, 2005	Kitt Peak	Spacewatch	·	1.8 km	MPC · JPL
613283	2005 YU_{71}	—	December 24, 2005	Kitt Peak	Spacewatch	·	740 m	MPC · JPL
613284	2005 YP_{88}	—	December 25, 2005	Mount Lemmon	Mount Lemmon Survey	MAS	540 m	MPC · JPL
613285	2005 YL_{95}	—	December 25, 2005	Kitt Peak	Spacewatch	NYS	560 m	MPC · JPL
613286	2005 YQ_{96}	—	December 30, 2005	Catalina	CSS	IEO · PHA · moon	270 m	MPC · JPL
613287	2005 YJ_{107}	—	December 25, 2005	Mount Lemmon	Mount Lemmon Survey	·	970 m	MPC · JPL
613288	2005 YL_{118}	—	December 25, 2005	Kitt Peak	Spacewatch	·	450 m	MPC · JPL
613289	2005 YF_{119}	—	December 26, 2005	Mount Lemmon	Mount Lemmon Survey	H	620 m	MPC · JPL
613290	2005 YO_{126}	—	December 26, 2005	Kitt Peak	Spacewatch	ERI	1.4 km	MPC · JPL
613291	2005 YX_{128}	—	December 30, 2005	Socorro	LINEAR	APO	570 m	MPC · JPL
613292	2005 YE_{131}	—	December 25, 2005	Mount Lemmon	Mount Lemmon Survey	·	1.5 km	MPC · JPL
613293	2005 YT_{139}	—	December 28, 2005	Mount Lemmon	Mount Lemmon Survey	ERI	1.7 km	MPC · JPL
613294	2005 YC_{149}	—	December 25, 2005	Kitt Peak	Spacewatch	·	1.7 km	MPC · JPL
613295	2005 YU_{149}	—	December 25, 2005	Kitt Peak	Spacewatch	·	1.4 km	MPC · JPL
613296	2005 YW_{155}	—	December 25, 2005	Kitt Peak	Spacewatch	·	1.3 km	MPC · JPL
613297	2005 YW_{157}	—	December 27, 2005	Kitt Peak	Spacewatch	·	2.0 km	MPC · JPL
613298	2005 YT_{161}	—	December 27, 2005	Kitt Peak	Spacewatch	·	1.0 km	MPC · JPL
613299	2005 YX_{166}	—	December 27, 2005	Kitt Peak	Spacewatch	·	1.7 km	MPC · JPL
613300	2005 YA_{181}	—	December 22, 2005	Socorro	LINEAR	T_{j} (2.97)	2.8 km	MPC · JPL

== 613301–613400 ==
back to top

Designation			Discovery			Properties		Ref
Permanent	Provisional	Named after	Date	Site	Discoverer(s)	Category	Diam.	Ref
613301	2005 YK_{200}	—	December 22, 2005	Kitt Peak	Spacewatch	·	3.1 km	MPC · JPL
613302	2005 YC_{201}	—	December 22, 2005	Kitt Peak	Spacewatch	·	660 m	MPC · JPL
613303	2005 YM_{203}	—	December 25, 2005	Kitt Peak	Spacewatch	·	860 m	MPC · JPL
613304	2005 YT_{218}	—	December 30, 2005	Mount Lemmon	Mount Lemmon Survey	·	520 m	MPC · JPL
613305	2005 YT_{229}	—	December 26, 2005	Mount Lemmon	Mount Lemmon Survey	·	930 m	MPC · JPL
613306	2005 YA_{232}	—	December 28, 2005	Mount Lemmon	Mount Lemmon Survey	·	2.7 km	MPC · JPL
613307	2005 YE_{248}	—	December 31, 2005	Mount Lemmon	Mount Lemmon Survey	T_{j} (2.98)	2.6 km	MPC · JPL
613308	2005 YF_{256}	—	December 30, 2005	Kitt Peak	Spacewatch	·	1.7 km	MPC · JPL
613309	2005 YW_{258}	—	December 24, 2005	Kitt Peak	Spacewatch	V	420 m	MPC · JPL
613310	2005 YT_{261}	—	December 25, 2005	Kitt Peak	Spacewatch	MAS	600 m	MPC · JPL
613311	2005 YV_{263}	—	December 25, 2005	Kitt Peak	Spacewatch	·	860 m	MPC · JPL
613312	2005 YA_{274}	—	December 30, 2005	Mount Lemmon	Mount Lemmon Survey	·	940 m	MPC · JPL
613313	2005 YY_{279}	—	December 25, 2005	Kitt Peak	Spacewatch	·	820 m	MPC · JPL
613314	2005 YR_{289}	—	December 25, 2005	Anderson Mesa	LONEOS	·	470 m	MPC · JPL
613315	2006 AL_{3}	—	January 5, 2006	Catalina	CSS	AMO	350 m	MPC · JPL
613316	2006 AO_{13}	—	January 5, 2006	Mount Lemmon	Mount Lemmon Survey	·	660 m	MPC · JPL
613317	2006 AJ_{15}	—	January 5, 2006	Mount Lemmon	Mount Lemmon Survey	·	860 m	MPC · JPL
613318	2006 AN_{25}	—	January 5, 2006	Kitt Peak	Spacewatch	MAS	550 m	MPC · JPL
613319	2006 AL_{52}	—	January 5, 2006	Kitt Peak	Spacewatch	·	1.0 km	MPC · JPL
613320	2006 AA_{56}	—	January 6, 2006	Mount Lemmon	Mount Lemmon Survey	·	490 m	MPC · JPL
613321	2006 AR_{60}	—	January 5, 2006	Kitt Peak	Spacewatch	NYS	760 m	MPC · JPL
613322	2006 AE_{70}	—	January 6, 2006	Kitt Peak	Spacewatch	·	830 m	MPC · JPL
613323	2006 AT_{74}	—	January 7, 2006	Anderson Mesa	LONEOS	PHO	3.0 km	MPC · JPL
613324	2006 AE_{92}	—	January 7, 2006	Mount Lemmon	Mount Lemmon Survey	NYS	840 m	MPC · JPL
613325	2006 AH_{105}	—	January 4, 2006	Kitt Peak	Spacewatch	LIX	2.4 km	MPC · JPL
613326	2006 BT_{1}	—	January 20, 2006	Kitt Peak	Spacewatch	NYS	940 m	MPC · JPL
613327	2006 BM_{34}	—	January 22, 2006	Mount Lemmon	Mount Lemmon Survey	PHO	2.2 km	MPC · JPL
613328	2006 BH_{55}	—	January 26, 2006	Kitt Peak	Spacewatch	·	750 m	MPC · JPL
613329	2006 BB_{58}	—	January 23, 2006	Mount Lemmon	Mount Lemmon Survey	·	620 m	MPC · JPL
613330	2006 BF_{62}	—	January 22, 2006	Catalina	CSS	H	580 m	MPC · JPL
613331	2006 BA_{66}	—	January 23, 2006	Kitt Peak	Spacewatch	·	730 m	MPC · JPL
613332	2006 BR_{70}	—	January 23, 2006	Kitt Peak	Spacewatch	·	930 m	MPC · JPL
613333	2006 BS_{74}	—	January 23, 2006	Kitt Peak	Spacewatch	·	1.1 km	MPC · JPL
613334	2006 BA_{78}	—	January 23, 2006	Mount Lemmon	Mount Lemmon Survey	·	980 m	MPC · JPL
613335	2006 BF_{103}	—	January 23, 2006	Mount Lemmon	Mount Lemmon Survey	·	780 m	MPC · JPL
613336	2006 BT_{103}	—	January 23, 2006	Mount Lemmon	Mount Lemmon Survey	NYS	780 m	MPC · JPL
613337	2006 BY_{103}	—	January 23, 2006	Mount Lemmon	Mount Lemmon Survey	·	790 m	MPC · JPL
613338	2006 BO_{109}	—	January 25, 2006	Kitt Peak	Spacewatch	·	1.4 km	MPC · JPL
613339	2006 BV_{126}	—	January 26, 2006	Kitt Peak	Spacewatch	·	710 m	MPC · JPL
613340	2006 BO_{127}	—	January 26, 2006	Kitt Peak	Spacewatch	MAS	520 m	MPC · JPL
613341	2006 BE_{129}	—	January 26, 2006	Mount Lemmon	Mount Lemmon Survey	(5)	750 m	MPC · JPL
613342	2006 BY_{134}	—	January 27, 2006	Mount Lemmon	Mount Lemmon Survey	THM	1.8 km	MPC · JPL
613343	2006 BV_{152}	—	January 25, 2006	Kitt Peak	Spacewatch	·	760 m	MPC · JPL
613344	2006 BS_{171}	—	January 27, 2006	Kitt Peak	Spacewatch	VER	2.1 km	MPC · JPL
613345	2006 BL_{178}	—	January 27, 2006	Mount Lemmon	Mount Lemmon Survey	·	1.5 km	MPC · JPL
613346	2006 BN_{195}	—	January 30, 2006	Kitt Peak	Spacewatch	·	1.1 km	MPC · JPL
613347	2006 BT_{199}	—	January 30, 2006	Kitt Peak	Spacewatch	·	850 m	MPC · JPL
613348	2006 BS_{201}	—	January 31, 2006	Kitt Peak	Spacewatch	·	670 m	MPC · JPL
613349	2006 BF_{208}	—	January 31, 2006	Catalina	CSS	T_{j} (2.4) · unusual	7.0 km	MPC · JPL
613350	2006 BK_{210}	—	January 31, 2006	Kitt Peak	Spacewatch	NYS	1.0 km	MPC · JPL
613351	2006 BA_{227}	—	January 30, 2006	Kitt Peak	Spacewatch	·	2.4 km	MPC · JPL
613352	2006 BB_{229}	—	January 31, 2006	Kitt Peak	Spacewatch	·	650 m	MPC · JPL
613353	2006 BE_{229}	—	January 31, 2006	Kitt Peak	Spacewatch	·	800 m	MPC · JPL
613354	2006 BG_{229}	—	January 31, 2006	Kitt Peak	Spacewatch	·	720 m	MPC · JPL
613355	2006 BC_{231}	—	January 31, 2006	Kitt Peak	Spacewatch	NYS	990 m	MPC · JPL
613356	2006 BM_{231}	—	January 31, 2006	Kitt Peak	Spacewatch	·	2.6 km	MPC · JPL
613357	2006 BG_{245}	—	January 31, 2006	Kitt Peak	Spacewatch	·	690 m	MPC · JPL
613358	2006 BD_{247}	—	January 31, 2006	Kitt Peak	Spacewatch	PHO	750 m	MPC · JPL
613359	2006 BY_{263}	—	January 31, 2006	Kitt Peak	Spacewatch	·	820 m	MPC · JPL
613360	2006 BK_{278}	—	January 22, 2006	Mount Lemmon	Mount Lemmon Survey	NYS	1.1 km	MPC · JPL
613361	2006 BM_{279}	—	January 26, 2006	Kitt Peak	Spacewatch	EUN	850 m	MPC · JPL
613362	2006 BE_{280}	—	January 26, 2006	Kitt Peak	Spacewatch	·	1.6 km	MPC · JPL
613363	2006 BQ_{282}	—	January 25, 2006	Kitt Peak	Spacewatch	·	710 m	MPC · JPL
613364	2006 BO_{284}	—	January 31, 2006	Kitt Peak	Spacewatch	MAS	570 m	MPC · JPL
613365	2006 CR_{3}	—	February 1, 2006	Mount Lemmon	Mount Lemmon Survey	(6769)	1.0 km	MPC · JPL
613366	2006 CA_{27}	—	February 2, 2006	Kitt Peak	Spacewatch	·	3.1 km	MPC · JPL
613367	2006 CR_{59}	—	February 6, 2006	Mount Lemmon	Mount Lemmon Survey	·	1.0 km	MPC · JPL
613368	2006 CT_{66}	—	February 1, 2006	Kitt Peak	Spacewatch	·	820 m	MPC · JPL
613369	2006 DU_{21}	—	February 20, 2006	Kitt Peak	Spacewatch	·	1.1 km	MPC · JPL
613370	2006 DY_{25}	—	February 20, 2006	Kitt Peak	Spacewatch	MAS	520 m	MPC · JPL
613371	2006 DJ_{30}	—	February 20, 2006	Kitt Peak	Spacewatch	NYS	940 m	MPC · JPL
613372	2006 DC_{31}	—	February 20, 2006	Kitt Peak	Spacewatch	·	490 m	MPC · JPL
613373	2006 DG_{43}	—	February 20, 2006	Kitt Peak	Spacewatch	NYS	890 m	MPC · JPL
613374	2006 DE_{53}	—	February 24, 2006	Kitt Peak	Spacewatch	NYS	870 m	MPC · JPL
613375	2006 DU_{56}	—	February 24, 2006	Mount Lemmon	Mount Lemmon Survey	·	1.5 km	MPC · JPL
613376	2006 DB_{78}	—	February 24, 2006	Kitt Peak	Spacewatch	·	850 m	MPC · JPL
613377	2006 DY_{78}	—	February 24, 2006	Kitt Peak	Spacewatch	(5)	930 m	MPC · JPL
613378	2006 DZ_{85}	—	February 24, 2006	Kitt Peak	Spacewatch	·	2.4 km	MPC · JPL
613379	2006 DX_{86}	—	February 24, 2006	Kitt Peak	Spacewatch	MAS	510 m	MPC · JPL
613380	2006 DN_{102}	—	February 25, 2006	Mount Lemmon	Mount Lemmon Survey	·	1.0 km	MPC · JPL
613381	2006 DB_{123}	—	February 24, 2006	Mount Lemmon	Mount Lemmon Survey	·	2.1 km	MPC · JPL
613382	2006 DL_{136}	—	February 25, 2006	Kitt Peak	Spacewatch	·	770 m	MPC · JPL
613383	2006 DE_{160}	—	February 27, 2006	Kitt Peak	Spacewatch	NYS	1.0 km	MPC · JPL
613384	2006 DH_{166}	—	February 27, 2006	Kitt Peak	Spacewatch	·	860 m	MPC · JPL
613385	2006 DC_{171}	—	February 27, 2006	Kitt Peak	Spacewatch	MIS	1.9 km	MPC · JPL
613386	2006 DH_{180}	—	February 27, 2006	Mount Lemmon	Mount Lemmon Survey	·	1.1 km	MPC · JPL
613387	2006 DY_{180}	—	February 27, 2006	Kitt Peak	Spacewatch	·	730 m	MPC · JPL
613388	2006 DY_{194}	—	February 28, 2006	Mount Lemmon	Mount Lemmon Survey	(5)	790 m	MPC · JPL
613389	2006 DJ_{208}	—	February 25, 2006	Kitt Peak	Spacewatch	·	1.1 km	MPC · JPL
613390	2006 ED_{8}	—	March 2, 2006	Kitt Peak	Spacewatch	·	900 m	MPC · JPL
613391	2006 ED_{14}	—	March 2, 2006	Kitt Peak	Spacewatch	·	2.0 km	MPC · JPL
613392	2006 EW_{17}	—	March 2, 2006	Kitt Peak	Spacewatch	·	1.1 km	MPC · JPL
613393	2006 EX_{19}	—	March 2, 2006	Kitt Peak	Spacewatch	·	570 m	MPC · JPL
613394	2006 EZ_{21}	—	March 3, 2006	Kitt Peak	Spacewatch	MAS	550 m	MPC · JPL
613395	2006 EP_{22}	—	March 3, 2006	Kitt Peak	Spacewatch	·	1.6 km	MPC · JPL
613396	2006 EG_{26}	—	March 3, 2006	Kitt Peak	Spacewatch	·	750 m	MPC · JPL
613397	2006 FE	—	March 22, 2006	Socorro	LINEAR	APO	310 m	MPC · JPL
613398	2006 FK	—	March 23, 2006	Catalina	CSS	ATE	200 m	MPC · JPL
613399	2006 FT_{12}	—	March 23, 2006	Kitt Peak	Spacewatch	·	1.0 km	MPC · JPL
613400	2006 FH_{36}	—	March 31, 2006	Siding Spring	SSS	ATE	90 m	MPC · JPL

== 613401–613500 ==
back to top

Designation			Discovery			Properties		Ref
Permanent	Provisional	Named after	Date	Site	Discoverer(s)	Category	Diam.	Ref
613401	2006 FD_{51}	—	March 25, 2006	Catalina	CSS	AMO	620 m	MPC · JPL
613402	2006 FE_{55}	—	March 23, 2006	Kitt Peak	Spacewatch	NEM	1.6 km	MPC · JPL
613403	2006 GB	—	April 2, 2006	Socorro	LINEAR	ATE · PHA	320 m	MPC · JPL
613404	2006 GT_{28}	—	April 2, 2006	Kitt Peak	Spacewatch	·	1.6 km	MPC · JPL
613405	2006 GQ_{30}	—	April 2, 2006	Mount Lemmon	Mount Lemmon Survey	JUN	2.0 km	MPC · JPL
613406	2006 HM_{27}	—	April 20, 2006	Kitt Peak	Spacewatch	·	1.1 km	MPC · JPL
613407	2006 HX_{40}	—	April 21, 2006	Kitt Peak	Spacewatch	·	1.2 km	MPC · JPL
613408	2006 HA_{43}	—	April 24, 2006	Mount Lemmon	Mount Lemmon Survey	·	2.8 km	MPC · JPL
613409	2006 HC_{73}	—	April 25, 2006	Kitt Peak	Spacewatch	·	1.0 km	MPC · JPL
613410	2006 HO_{80}	—	April 26, 2006	Kitt Peak	Spacewatch	·	770 m	MPC · JPL
613411	2006 HQ_{122}	—	April 26, 2006	Cerro Tololo	M. W. Buie	SDO	186 km	MPC · JPL
613412	2006 HV_{122}	—	April 27, 2006	Cerro Tololo	M. W. Buie	SDO	150 km	MPC · JPL
613413	2006 HQ_{127}	—	April 28, 2006	Cerro Tololo	M. W. Buie	·	1.6 km	MPC · JPL
613414	2006 HW_{138}	—	April 26, 2006	Cerro Tololo	M. W. Buie	·	1.1 km	MPC · JPL
613415	2006 HC_{153}	—	April 26, 2006	Kitt Peak	Spacewatch	·	550 m	MPC · JPL
613416	2006 JL_{9}	—	May 1, 2006	Kitt Peak	Spacewatch	·	990 m	MPC · JPL
613417	2006 JM_{44}	—	May 6, 2006	Kitt Peak	Spacewatch	NYS	800 m	MPC · JPL
613418	2006 JN_{65}	—	May 1, 2006	Kitt Peak	M. W. Buie	·	510 m	MPC · JPL
613419 Lafayettequartet	2006 JQ_{75}	Lafayettequartet	May 1, 2006	Mauna Kea	P. A. Wiegert	·	570 m	MPC · JPL
613420	2006 KR_{1}	—	May 20, 2006	Kitt Peak	Spacewatch	APO	310 m	MPC · JPL
613421	2006 KX_{12}	—	May 20, 2006	Kitt Peak	Spacewatch	·	1.4 km	MPC · JPL
613422	2006 KQ_{21}	—	May 23, 2006	Kitt Peak	Spacewatch	AMO	650 m	MPC · JPL
613423	2006 KK_{28}	—	May 20, 2006	Kitt Peak	Spacewatch	·	750 m	MPC · JPL
613424	2006 KR_{39}	—	May 21, 2006	Anderson Mesa	LONEOS	·	1.2 km	MPC · JPL
613425	2006 KP_{49}	—	May 21, 2006	Kitt Peak	Spacewatch	·	990 m	MPC · JPL
613426	2006 KT_{51}	—	May 21, 2006	Kitt Peak	Spacewatch	·	1.1 km	MPC · JPL
613427	2006 KF_{61}	—	May 22, 2006	Kitt Peak	Spacewatch	·	380 m	MPC · JPL
613428	2006 KA_{62}	—	May 22, 2006	Kitt Peak	Spacewatch	·	1.2 km	MPC · JPL
613429	2006 KJ_{63}	—	May 23, 2006	Mount Lemmon	Mount Lemmon Survey	·	1.2 km	MPC · JPL
613430	2006 KY_{71}	—	May 22, 2006	Kitt Peak	Spacewatch	·	780 m	MPC · JPL
613431	2006 KC_{82}	—	May 25, 2006	Mount Lemmon	Mount Lemmon Survey	·	1.1 km	MPC · JPL
613432	2006 KZ_{83}	—	May 21, 2006	Kitt Peak	Spacewatch	·	770 m	MPC · JPL
613433	2006 KZ_{86}	—	May 27, 2006	Mount Lemmon	Mount Lemmon Survey	APO +1km	830 m	MPC · JPL
613434	2006 KF_{89}	—	May 28, 2006	Socorro	LINEAR	AMO	690 m	MPC · JPL
613435	2006 KN_{101}	—	May 26, 2006	Mount Lemmon	Mount Lemmon Survey	·	840 m	MPC · JPL
613436	2006 KA_{145}	—	May 25, 2006	Mount Lemmon	Mount Lemmon Survey	·	1.5 km	MPC · JPL
613437	2006 MR_{9}	—	June 20, 2006	Kitt Peak	Spacewatch	·	1.2 km	MPC · JPL
613438	2006 OG	—	July 18, 2006	Eskridge	Farpoint	·	1.3 km	MPC · JPL
613439	2006 OZ	—	July 18, 2006	Siding Spring	SSS	AMO	650 m	MPC · JPL
613440	2006 OA_{5}	—	July 21, 2006	Socorro	LINEAR	APO	410 m	MPC · JPL
613441	2006 OT_{10}	—	July 25, 2006	Mount Lemmon	Mount Lemmon Survey	·	1.3 km	MPC · JPL
613442	2006 OY_{14}	—	July 26, 2006	Reedy Creek	J. Broughton	·	1.1 km	MPC · JPL
613443	2006 OX_{16}	—	July 21, 2006	Mount Lemmon	Mount Lemmon Survey	PHO	1.7 km	MPC · JPL
613444	2006 PN_{1}	—	August 11, 2006	Palomar	NEAT	·	1.3 km	MPC · JPL
613445	2006 PO_{2}	—	August 12, 2006	Palomar	NEAT	·	1.1 km	MPC · JPL
613446	2006 PB_{6}	—	August 12, 2006	Palomar	NEAT	·	910 m	MPC · JPL
613447	2006 PN_{7}	—	August 12, 2006	Palomar	NEAT	·	1.2 km	MPC · JPL
613448	2006 PM_{12}	—	August 13, 2006	Palomar	NEAT	·	650 m	MPC · JPL
613449	2006 PZ_{16}	—	August 15, 2006	Palomar	NEAT	·	1.7 km	MPC · JPL
613450	2006 PY_{17}	—	August 15, 2006	Palomar	NEAT	APO · PHA	490 m	MPC · JPL
613451	2006 PN_{30}	—	August 12, 2006	Palomar	NEAT	·	3.4 km	MPC · JPL
613452	2006 PK_{31}	—	August 13, 2006	Palomar	NEAT	·	1.4 km	MPC · JPL
613453	2006 QD_{7}	—	August 17, 2006	Palomar	NEAT	T_{j} (2.97)	4.1 km	MPC · JPL
613454	2006 QP_{23}	—	August 19, 2006	Anderson Mesa	LONEOS	·	1.2 km	MPC · JPL
613455	2006 QH_{32}	—	August 19, 2006	Palomar	NEAT	·	2.7 km	MPC · JPL
613456	2006 QE_{33}	—	August 23, 2006	Socorro	LINEAR	·	1.5 km	MPC · JPL
613457	2006 QV_{35}	—	August 17, 2006	Palomar	NEAT	·	1.7 km	MPC · JPL
613458	2006 QP_{65}	—	August 27, 2006	Kitt Peak	Spacewatch	·	1.5 km	MPC · JPL
613459	2006 QN_{78}	—	August 22, 2006	Palomar	NEAT	·	970 m	MPC · JPL
613460	2006 QR_{119}	—	August 28, 2006	Catalina	CSS	·	960 m	MPC · JPL
613461	2006 QW_{122}	—	August 29, 2006	Catalina	CSS	·	1.6 km	MPC · JPL
613462	2006 QJ_{135}	—	August 27, 2006	Anderson Mesa	LONEOS	·	1.2 km	MPC · JPL
613463	2006 QH_{137}	—	August 31, 2006	Dax	Dax	·	1.4 km	MPC · JPL
613464	2006 QN_{155}	—	August 18, 2006	Palomar	NEAT	·	670 m	MPC · JPL
613465	2006 QK_{158}	—	August 19, 2006	Kitt Peak	Spacewatch	·	1.1 km	MPC · JPL
613466	2006 QS_{163}	—	August 19, 2006	Kitt Peak	Spacewatch	·	440 m	MPC · JPL
613467	2006 QL_{164}	—	August 29, 2006	Anderson Mesa	LONEOS	·	2.7 km	MPC · JPL
613468	2006 QQ_{180}	—	August 28, 2006	Apache Point	Apache Point	res · 3:5	167 km	MPC · JPL
613469	2006 QJ_{181}	—	August 21, 2006	Cerro Tololo	Deep Ecliptic Survey	res · 1:3	144 km	MPC · JPL
613470	2006 QY_{182}	—	August 19, 2006	Kitt Peak	Spacewatch	·	1.3 km	MPC · JPL
613471	2006 RJ_{1}	—	September 12, 2006	Catalina	CSS	ATE	120 m	MPC · JPL
613472	2006 RF_{2}	—	September 14, 2006	Palomar	NEAT	·	1.2 km	MPC · JPL
613473	2006 RO_{10}	—	September 14, 2006	Palomar	NEAT	H	360 m	MPC · JPL
613474	2006 RH_{32}	—	September 15, 2006	Kitt Peak	Spacewatch	·	1.0 km	MPC · JPL
613475	2006 RB_{37}	—	September 12, 2006	Catalina	CSS	·	1.4 km	MPC · JPL
613476	2006 RY_{39}	—	September 12, 2006	Catalina	CSS	·	1.8 km	MPC · JPL
613477	2006 RO_{41}	—	September 14, 2006	Catalina	CSS	(5)	1.1 km	MPC · JPL
613478	2006 RL_{42}	—	September 14, 2006	Kitt Peak	Spacewatch	·	920 m	MPC · JPL
613479	2006 RP_{45}	—	September 14, 2006	Kitt Peak	Spacewatch	T_{j} (2.97)	2.4 km	MPC · JPL
613480	2006 RF_{69}	—	September 15, 2006	Kitt Peak	Spacewatch	·	690 m	MPC · JPL
613481	2006 RZ_{70}	—	September 15, 2006	Kitt Peak	Spacewatch	·	760 m	MPC · JPL
613482	2006 RH_{73}	—	September 15, 2006	Kitt Peak	Spacewatch	·	750 m	MPC · JPL
613483	2006 RH_{74}	—	September 15, 2006	Kitt Peak	Spacewatch	·	670 m	MPC · JPL
613484	2006 RG_{75}	—	September 15, 2006	Kitt Peak	Spacewatch	·	690 m	MPC · JPL
613485	2006 RE_{79}	—	September 15, 2006	Kitt Peak	Spacewatch	·	1.0 km	MPC · JPL
613486	2006 RD_{80}	—	September 15, 2006	Kitt Peak	Spacewatch	EUN	640 m	MPC · JPL
613487	2006 RN_{80}	—	September 15, 2006	Kitt Peak	Spacewatch	·	630 m	MPC · JPL
613488	2006 RY_{94}	—	September 15, 2006	Kitt Peak	Spacewatch	·	870 m	MPC · JPL
613489	2006 RH_{96}	—	September 15, 2006	Kitt Peak	Spacewatch	·	1.1 km	MPC · JPL
613490	2006 RJ_{103}	—	September 12, 2006	Apache Point	Apache Point	NT	179 km	MPC · JPL
613491	2006 RZ_{109}	—	September 14, 2006	Mauna Kea	Masiero, J.	MAS	630 m	MPC · JPL
613492	2006 RR_{114}	—	September 14, 2006	Mauna Kea	Masiero, J.	THM	1.8 km	MPC · JPL
613493	2006 RQ_{116}	—	September 14, 2006	Mauna Kea	Masiero, J.	·	870 m	MPC · JPL
613494	2006 RX_{118}	—	September 14, 2006	Mauna Kea	Masiero, J.	·	1.8 km	MPC · JPL
613495	2006 RL_{119}	—	September 14, 2006	Mauna Kea	Masiero, J.	·	1.0 km	MPC · JPL
613496	2006 SD_{6}	—	September 17, 2006	Kitt Peak	Spacewatch	AMO	320 m	MPC · JPL
613497	2006 SH_{22}	—	September 17, 2006	Anderson Mesa	LONEOS	·	1.2 km	MPC · JPL
613498	2006 SG_{23}	—	September 17, 2006	Anderson Mesa	LONEOS	·	1.5 km	MPC · JPL
613499	2006 SS_{29}	—	September 17, 2006	Kitt Peak	Spacewatch	KON	1.7 km	MPC · JPL
613500	2006 SF_{33}	—	September 17, 2006	Catalina	CSS	·	550 m	MPC · JPL

== 613501–613600 ==
back to top

Designation			Discovery			Properties		Ref
Permanent	Provisional	Named after	Date	Site	Discoverer(s)	Category	Diam.	Ref
613501	2006 SJ_{39}	—	September 18, 2006	Catalina	CSS	(5)	870 m	MPC · JPL
613502	2006 SO_{49}	—	September 19, 2006	Siding Spring	SSS	·	1.3 km	MPC · JPL
613503	2006 SS_{68}	—	September 19, 2006	Kitt Peak	Spacewatch	·	600 m	MPC · JPL
613504	2006 SK_{86}	—	September 18, 2006	Kitt Peak	Spacewatch	·	400 m	MPC · JPL
613505	2006 SA_{91}	—	September 18, 2006	Kitt Peak	Spacewatch	·	730 m	MPC · JPL
613506	2006 SU_{92}	—	September 18, 2006	Kitt Peak	Spacewatch	·	890 m	MPC · JPL
613507	2006 SQ_{105}	—	September 19, 2006	Kitt Peak	Spacewatch	·	590 m	MPC · JPL
613508	2006 SY_{106}	—	September 19, 2006	Kitt Peak	Spacewatch	·	510 m	MPC · JPL
613509	2006 SC_{109}	—	September 19, 2006	Kitt Peak	Spacewatch	·	1.5 km	MPC · JPL
613510	2006 SR_{129}	—	September 19, 2006	Anderson Mesa	LONEOS	·	1.5 km	MPC · JPL
613511	2006 SR_{132}	—	September 16, 2006	Catalina	CSS	·	750 m	MPC · JPL
613512	2006 SK_{134}	—	September 27, 2006	Catalina	CSS	APO	640 m	MPC · JPL
613513	2006 SV_{144}	—	September 19, 2006	Kitt Peak	Spacewatch	·	1.1 km	MPC · JPL
613514	2006 ST_{146}	—	September 19, 2006	Kitt Peak	Spacewatch	·	1.3 km	MPC · JPL
613515	2006 SF_{147}	—	September 19, 2006	Kitt Peak	Spacewatch	MIS	1.7 km	MPC · JPL
613516	2006 SR_{150}	—	September 19, 2006	Kitt Peak	Spacewatch	·	800 m	MPC · JPL
613517	2006 SW_{150}	—	September 19, 2006	Kitt Peak	Spacewatch	·	630 m	MPC · JPL
613518	2006 SO_{154}	—	September 21, 2006	Bergisch Gladbach	W. Bickel	·	1.4 km	MPC · JPL
613519	2006 SW_{160}	—	September 23, 2006	Kitt Peak	Spacewatch	·	700 m	MPC · JPL
613520	2006 SA_{162}	—	September 24, 2006	Kitt Peak	Spacewatch	·	450 m	MPC · JPL
613521	2006 SP_{162}	—	September 24, 2006	Kitt Peak	Spacewatch	·	400 m	MPC · JPL
613522	2006 SA_{163}	—	September 24, 2006	Kitt Peak	Spacewatch	·	1.2 km	MPC · JPL
613523	2006 SE_{167}	—	September 25, 2006	Kitt Peak	Spacewatch	·	630 m	MPC · JPL
613524	2006 SO_{169}	—	September 25, 2006	Kitt Peak	Spacewatch	·	2.1 km	MPC · JPL
613525	2006 SA_{183}	—	September 25, 2006	Mount Lemmon	Mount Lemmon Survey	·	610 m	MPC · JPL
613526	2006 ST_{189}	—	September 26, 2006	Kitt Peak	Spacewatch	KOR	950 m	MPC · JPL
613527	2006 SV_{189}	—	September 26, 2006	Mount Lemmon	Mount Lemmon Survey	AMO	390 m	MPC · JPL
613528	2006 SZ_{197}	—	September 27, 2006	Mayhill	Lowe, A.	·	950 m	MPC · JPL
613529	2006 SH_{198}	—	September 29, 2006	Siding Spring	SSS	·	1.4 km	MPC · JPL
613530	2006 SS_{198}	—	September 22, 2006	Anderson Mesa	LONEOS	·	1.4 km	MPC · JPL
613531	2006 SP_{200}	—	September 24, 2006	Kitt Peak	Spacewatch	·	1.2 km	MPC · JPL
613532	2006 SL_{207}	—	September 25, 2006	Kitt Peak	Spacewatch	·	1.0 km	MPC · JPL
613533	2006 SH_{209}	—	September 26, 2006	Socorro	LINEAR	·	1.1 km	MPC · JPL
613534	2006 SR_{209}	—	September 26, 2006	Mount Lemmon	Mount Lemmon Survey	·	2.4 km	MPC · JPL
613535	2006 SH_{217}	—	September 28, 2006	Kitt Peak	Spacewatch	·	540 m	MPC · JPL
613536	2006 SZ_{225}	—	September 26, 2006	Kitt Peak	Spacewatch	·	1.4 km	MPC · JPL
613537	2006 SE_{232}	—	September 26, 2006	Kitt Peak	Spacewatch	·	550 m	MPC · JPL
613538	2006 ST_{234}	—	September 26, 2006	Kitt Peak	Spacewatch	·	1.4 km	MPC · JPL
613539	2006 SJ_{250}	—	September 26, 2006	Kitt Peak	Spacewatch	·	500 m	MPC · JPL
613540	2006 SV_{250}	—	September 26, 2006	Kitt Peak	Spacewatch	·	650 m	MPC · JPL
613541	2006 SP_{257}	—	September 26, 2006	Kitt Peak	Spacewatch	·	1.0 km	MPC · JPL
613542	2006 SE_{259}	—	September 26, 2006	Kitt Peak	Spacewatch	·	1.1 km	MPC · JPL
613543	2006 SA_{260}	—	September 26, 2006	Kitt Peak	Spacewatch	·	640 m	MPC · JPL
613544	2006 SG_{273}	—	September 27, 2006	Kitt Peak	Spacewatch	KON	1.3 km	MPC · JPL
613545	2006 ST_{275}	—	September 28, 2006	Kitt Peak	Spacewatch	(5)	1.6 km	MPC · JPL
613546	2006 SX_{287}	—	September 25, 2006	Socorro	LINEAR	·	1.4 km	MPC · JPL
613547	2006 SE_{303}	—	September 27, 2006	Kitt Peak	Spacewatch	·	890 m	MPC · JPL
613548	2006 SV_{317}	—	September 27, 2006	Kitt Peak	Spacewatch	·	680 m	MPC · JPL
613549	2006 SC_{326}	—	September 27, 2006	Kitt Peak	Spacewatch	·	1.3 km	MPC · JPL
613550	2006 SH_{334}	—	September 28, 2006	Kitt Peak	Spacewatch	·	760 m	MPC · JPL
613551	2006 SX_{346}	—	September 28, 2006	Catalina	CSS	·	1.1 km	MPC · JPL
613552	2006 SV_{353}	—	September 30, 2006	Catalina	CSS	·	950 m	MPC · JPL
613553	2006 SJ_{361}	—	September 30, 2006	Mount Lemmon	Mount Lemmon Survey	ADE	2.2 km	MPC · JPL
613554	2006 SF_{363}	—	September 30, 2006	Mount Lemmon	Mount Lemmon Survey	·	930 m	MPC · JPL
613555	2006 SY_{374}	—	September 16, 2006	Apache Point	A. C. Becker	·	940 m	MPC · JPL
613556	2006 SL_{376}	—	September 17, 2006	Apache Point	A. C. Becker	·	430 m	MPC · JPL
613557	2006 SG_{380}	—	September 27, 2006	Apache Point	A. C. Becker	·	1.0 km	MPC · JPL
613558	2006 SL_{383}	—	September 29, 2006	Apache Point	A. C. Becker	·	1.1 km	MPC · JPL
613559	2006 SU_{391}	—	September 18, 2006	Kitt Peak	Spacewatch	·	1.5 km	MPC · JPL
613560	2006 SB_{395}	—	September 30, 2006	Mount Lemmon	Mount Lemmon Survey	·	1.3 km	MPC · JPL
613561	2006 SM_{396}	—	September 17, 2006	Kitt Peak	Spacewatch	·	490 m	MPC · JPL
613562	2006 SQ_{398}	—	September 17, 2006	Vail-Jarnac	Jarnac	ADE	1.6 km	MPC · JPL
613563	2006 SS_{398}	—	September 17, 2006	Kitt Peak	Spacewatch	critical	710 m	MPC · JPL
613564	2006 ST_{403}	—	September 28, 2006	Mount Lemmon	Mount Lemmon Survey	(5)	1.1 km	MPC · JPL
613565	2006 SW_{403}	—	September 28, 2006	Catalina	CSS	·	1.4 km	MPC · JPL
613566	2006 SN_{408}	—	September 30, 2006	Catalina	CSS	·	1.0 km	MPC · JPL
613567	2006 SX_{408}	—	September 27, 2006	Mount Lemmon	Mount Lemmon Survey	·	720 m	MPC · JPL
613568	2006 TM_{1}	—	October 1, 2006	Kitt Peak	Spacewatch	·	750 m	MPC · JPL
613569	2006 TU_{7}	—	October 12, 2006	Siding Spring	SSS	ATE · PHA	140 m	MPC · JPL
613570	2006 TN_{8}	—	October 4, 2006	Mount Lemmon	Mount Lemmon Survey	·	1.5 km	MPC · JPL
613571	2006 TL_{20}	—	October 11, 2006	Kitt Peak	Spacewatch	·	670 m	MPC · JPL
613572	2006 TS_{38}	—	October 12, 2006	Kitt Peak	Spacewatch	·	440 m	MPC · JPL
613573	2006 TQ_{39}	—	October 12, 2006	Kitt Peak	Spacewatch	·	570 m	MPC · JPL
613574	2006 TC_{54}	—	October 12, 2006	Kitt Peak	Spacewatch	·	2.5 km	MPC · JPL
613575	2006 TK_{69}	—	October 11, 2006	Palomar	NEAT	(194)	2.0 km	MPC · JPL
613576	2006 TO_{77}	—	October 12, 2006	Kitt Peak	Spacewatch	·	1.3 km	MPC · JPL
613577	2006 TE_{78}	—	October 12, 2006	Palomar	NEAT	·	1.5 km	MPC · JPL
613578	2006 TZ_{79}	—	October 13, 2006	Kitt Peak	Spacewatch	ADE	1.6 km	MPC · JPL
613579	2006 TS_{80}	—	October 13, 2006	Kitt Peak	Spacewatch	·	1.1 km	MPC · JPL
613580	2006 TY_{81}	—	October 13, 2006	Kitt Peak	Spacewatch	·	1.7 km	MPC · JPL
613581	2006 TV_{82}	—	October 13, 2006	Kitt Peak	Spacewatch	·	1.2 km	MPC · JPL
613582	2006 TW_{86}	—	October 13, 2006	Kitt Peak	Spacewatch	·	510 m	MPC · JPL
613583	2006 TE_{92}	—	October 13, 2006	Kitt Peak	Spacewatch	·	610 m	MPC · JPL
613584	2006 TM_{100}	—	October 15, 2006	Kitt Peak	Spacewatch	KON	1.5 km	MPC · JPL
613585	2006 TP_{103}	—	October 15, 2006	Kitt Peak	Spacewatch	MAS	490 m	MPC · JPL
613586	2006 TQ_{111}	—	October 1, 2006	Apache Point	A. C. Becker	·	1.7 km	MPC · JPL
613587	2006 TF_{112}	—	October 1, 2006	Apache Point	A. C. Becker	·	2.1 km	MPC · JPL
613588	2006 TO_{114}	—	October 1, 2006	Apache Point	A. C. Becker	·	1.3 km	MPC · JPL
613589	2006 TK_{122}	—	October 2, 2006	Mount Lemmon	Mount Lemmon Survey	·	950 m	MPC · JPL
613590	2006 TL_{122}	—	October 2, 2006	Mount Lemmon	Mount Lemmon Survey	·	1.1 km	MPC · JPL
613591	2006 TU_{122}	—	October 12, 2006	Kitt Peak	Spacewatch	·	1.3 km	MPC · JPL
613592	2006 UM_{1}	—	October 17, 2006	Piszkéstető	K. Sárneczky, Kuli, Z.	·	790 m	MPC · JPL
613593	2006 UQ_{2}	—	October 16, 2006	Catalina	CSS	(5)	810 m	MPC · JPL
613594	2006 UP_{4}	—	October 16, 2006	Kitt Peak	Spacewatch	·	1.1 km	MPC · JPL
613595	2006 UV_{17}	—	October 16, 2006	Kitt Peak	Spacewatch	H	460 m	MPC · JPL
613596	2006 UD_{27}	—	October 16, 2006	Kitt Peak	Spacewatch	·	810 m	MPC · JPL
613597	2006 UE_{31}	—	October 16, 2006	Kitt Peak	Spacewatch	·	850 m	MPC · JPL
613598	2006 UF_{31}	—	October 16, 2006	Kitt Peak	Spacewatch	·	1.5 km	MPC · JPL
613599	2006 UZ_{32}	—	October 16, 2006	Kitt Peak	Spacewatch	JUN	910 m	MPC · JPL
613600	2006 UL_{41}	—	October 16, 2006	Kitt Peak	Spacewatch	critical	980 m	MPC · JPL

== 613601–613700 ==
back to top

Designation			Discovery			Properties		Ref
Permanent	Provisional	Named after	Date	Site	Discoverer(s)	Category	Diam.	Ref
613601	2006 UL_{43}	—	October 16, 2006	Kitt Peak	Spacewatch	KON	1.7 km	MPC · JPL
613602	2006 UH_{59}	—	October 19, 2006	Kitt Peak	Spacewatch	·	740 m	MPC · JPL
613603	2006 UN_{77}	—	October 17, 2006	Kitt Peak	Spacewatch	·	990 m	MPC · JPL
613604	2006 UG_{79}	—	October 17, 2006	Kitt Peak	Spacewatch	·	770 m	MPC · JPL
613605	2006 UV_{117}	—	October 19, 2006	Kitt Peak	Spacewatch	·	600 m	MPC · JPL
613606	2006 UY_{119}	—	October 19, 2006	Kitt Peak	Spacewatch	·	760 m	MPC · JPL
613607	2006 UD_{122}	—	October 19, 2006	Kitt Peak	Spacewatch	·	2.0 km	MPC · JPL
613608	2006 UZ_{125}	—	October 19, 2006	Kitt Peak	Spacewatch	·	1.1 km	MPC · JPL
613609	2006 UG_{130}	—	October 19, 2006	Kitt Peak	Spacewatch	·	1.4 km	MPC · JPL
613610	2006 UV_{139}	—	October 19, 2006	Mount Lemmon	Mount Lemmon Survey	(5)	780 m	MPC · JPL
613611	2006 UM_{143}	—	October 19, 2006	Palomar	NEAT	·	1.0 km	MPC · JPL
613612	2006 UA_{144}	—	October 19, 2006	Kitt Peak	Spacewatch	H	480 m	MPC · JPL
613613	2006 UT_{151}	—	October 20, 2006	Mount Lemmon	Mount Lemmon Survey	·	1.8 km	MPC · JPL
613614	2006 UN_{159}	—	October 21, 2006	Mount Lemmon	Mount Lemmon Survey	·	1 km	MPC · JPL
613615	2006 UO_{165}	—	October 21, 2006	Mount Lemmon	Mount Lemmon Survey	(1547)	1.2 km	MPC · JPL
613616	2006 UW_{167}	—	October 21, 2006	Mount Lemmon	Mount Lemmon Survey	·	530 m	MPC · JPL
613617	2006 UO_{172}	—	October 22, 2006	Kitt Peak	Spacewatch	·	1.4 km	MPC · JPL
613618	2006 UH_{174}	—	October 19, 2006	Mount Lemmon	Mount Lemmon Survey	·	1.0 km	MPC · JPL
613619	2006 UX_{184}	—	October 22, 2006	La Palma	La Palma	centaur	100 km	MPC · JPL
613620	2006 UZ_{184}	—	October 22, 2006	La Palma	La Palma	plutino · fast	132 km	MPC · JPL
613621	2006 UG_{189}	—	October 19, 2006	Catalina	CSS	JUN	780 m	MPC · JPL
613622	2006 UK_{195}	—	October 20, 2006	Kitt Peak	Spacewatch	·	880 m	MPC · JPL
613623	2006 UQ_{197}	—	October 20, 2006	Kitt Peak	Spacewatch	·	440 m	MPC · JPL
613624	2006 UK_{198}	—	October 20, 2006	Kitt Peak	Spacewatch	·	890 m	MPC · JPL
613625	2006 UW_{211}	—	October 23, 2006	Kitt Peak	Spacewatch	(5)	810 m	MPC · JPL
613626	2006 UR_{216}	—	October 30, 2006	Mount Lemmon	Mount Lemmon Survey	APO	370 m	MPC · JPL
613627	2006 UY_{224}	—	October 19, 2006	Mount Lemmon	Mount Lemmon Survey	·	1.7 km	MPC · JPL
613628	2006 UM_{226}	—	October 20, 2006	Palomar	NEAT	·	1.4 km	MPC · JPL
613629	2006 UQ_{228}	—	October 20, 2006	Palomar	NEAT	·	590 m	MPC · JPL
613630	2006 UQ_{232}	—	October 21, 2006	Kitt Peak	Spacewatch	H	380 m	MPC · JPL
613631	2006 UY_{232}	—	October 21, 2006	Palomar	NEAT	·	970 m	MPC · JPL
613632	2006 UZ_{233}	—	October 22, 2006	Kitt Peak	Spacewatch	·	490 m	MPC · JPL
613633	2006 UG_{234}	—	October 22, 2006	Kitt Peak	Spacewatch	·	940 m	MPC · JPL
613634	2006 UW_{249}	—	October 27, 2006	Mount Lemmon	Mount Lemmon Survey	·	700 m	MPC · JPL
613635	2006 UH_{256}	—	October 28, 2006	Kitt Peak	Spacewatch	·	2.1 km	MPC · JPL
613636	2006 UW_{261}	—	October 28, 2006	Mount Lemmon	Mount Lemmon Survey	·	1.3 km	MPC · JPL
613637	2006 UK_{278}	—	October 28, 2006	Kitt Peak	Spacewatch	·	690 m	MPC · JPL
613638	2006 UV_{284}	—	October 28, 2006	Kitt Peak	Spacewatch	·	420 m	MPC · JPL
613639	2006 UG_{317}	—	October 19, 2006	Kitt Peak	M. W. Buie	·	1.4 km	MPC · JPL
613640	2006 UF_{335}	—	October 16, 2006	Kitt Peak	Spacewatch	(5)	900 m	MPC · JPL
613641	2006 UV_{337}	—	October 22, 2006	Kitt Peak	Spacewatch	T_{j} (2.95)	3.9 km	MPC · JPL
613642	2006 UW_{345}	—	October 16, 2006	Kitt Peak	Spacewatch	·	1.0 km	MPC · JPL
613643	2006 UU_{358}	—	October 19, 2006	Kitt Peak	Spacewatch	HOF	1.9 km	MPC · JPL
613644	2006 UG_{359}	—	October 21, 2006	Kitt Peak	Spacewatch	·	1.4 km	MPC · JPL
613645	2006 VG	—	November 1, 2006	Mount Lemmon	Mount Lemmon Survey	·	330 m	MPC · JPL
613646	2006 VP	—	November 1, 2006	Mount Lemmon	Mount Lemmon Survey	·	1.1 km	MPC · JPL
613647	2006 VH_{3}	—	November 9, 2006	Kitt Peak	Spacewatch	·	610 m	MPC · JPL
613648	2006 VC_{11}	—	November 11, 2006	Mount Lemmon	Mount Lemmon Survey	·	530 m	MPC · JPL
613649	2006 VP_{19}	—	November 9, 2006	Kitt Peak	Spacewatch	·	540 m	MPC · JPL
613650	2006 VH_{29}	—	November 10, 2006	Kitt Peak	Spacewatch	·	1 km	MPC · JPL
613651	2006 VJ_{39}	—	November 12, 2006	Mount Lemmon	Mount Lemmon Survey	·	1.3 km	MPC · JPL
613652	2006 VC_{44}	—	November 13, 2006	Kitt Peak	Spacewatch	·	990 m	MPC · JPL
613653	2006 VE_{49}	—	November 10, 2006	Kitt Peak	Spacewatch	·	1.4 km	MPC · JPL
613654	2006 VJ_{55}	—	November 11, 2006	Kitt Peak	Spacewatch	·	470 m	MPC · JPL
613655	2006 VF_{56}	—	November 11, 2006	Kitt Peak	Spacewatch	·	1.9 km	MPC · JPL
613656	2006 VM_{60}	—	November 11, 2006	Goodricke-Pigott	R. A. Tucker	·	1.1 km	MPC · JPL
613657	2006 VK_{66}	—	November 11, 2006	Kitt Peak	Spacewatch	·	850 m	MPC · JPL
613658	2006 VK_{68}	—	November 11, 2006	Kitt Peak	Spacewatch	·	1.6 km	MPC · JPL
613659	2006 VJ_{72}	—	November 11, 2006	Mount Lemmon	Mount Lemmon Survey	·	860 m	MPC · JPL
613660	2006 VE_{84}	—	November 13, 2006	Mount Lemmon	Mount Lemmon Survey	·	540 m	MPC · JPL
613661	2006 VP_{84}	—	November 13, 2006	Kitt Peak	Spacewatch	·	1.2 km	MPC · JPL
613662	2006 VX_{85}	—	November 14, 2006	Mount Lemmon	Mount Lemmon Survey	·	750 m	MPC · JPL
613663	2006 VY_{90}	—	November 14, 2006	Mount Lemmon	Mount Lemmon Survey	·	1.5 km	MPC · JPL
613664	2006 VC_{101}	—	November 11, 2006	Catalina	CSS	·	970 m	MPC · JPL
613665	2006 VP_{107}	—	November 13, 2006	Kitt Peak	Spacewatch	·	710 m	MPC · JPL
613666	2006 VG_{110}	—	November 13, 2006	Kitt Peak	Spacewatch	·	1.2 km	MPC · JPL
613667	2006 VD_{116}	—	November 14, 2006	Catalina	CSS	·	990 m	MPC · JPL
613668	2006 VW_{117}	—	November 14, 2006	Kitt Peak	Spacewatch	·	930 m	MPC · JPL
613669	2006 VL_{127}	—	November 15, 2006	Kitt Peak	Spacewatch	·	1.3 km	MPC · JPL
613670	2006 VA_{130}	—	November 15, 2006	Kitt Peak	Spacewatch	·	1.4 km	MPC · JPL
613671	2006 VC_{132}	—	November 15, 2006	Kitt Peak	Spacewatch	·	1.1 km	MPC · JPL
613672	2006 VA_{137}	—	November 15, 2006	Kitt Peak	Spacewatch	·	1.3 km	MPC · JPL
613673	2006 VA_{149}	—	November 15, 2006	Catalina	CSS	H	500 m	MPC · JPL
613674	2006 VV_{171}	—	November 10, 2006	Kitt Peak	Spacewatch	·	650 m	MPC · JPL
613675	2006 WM_{1}	—	November 19, 2006	Catalina	CSS	·	440 m	MPC · JPL
613676	2006 WE_{4}	—	November 21, 2006	Mount Lemmon	Mount Lemmon Survey	IEO	600 m	MPC · JPL
613677	2006 WA_{15}	—	November 16, 2006	Kitt Peak	Spacewatch	·	2.3 km	MPC · JPL
613678	2006 WB_{15}	—	November 16, 2006	Kitt Peak	Spacewatch	·	1.1 km	MPC · JPL
613679	2006 WY_{29}	—	November 23, 2006	Mount Lemmon	Mount Lemmon Survey	·	2.9 km	MPC · JPL
613680	2006 WX_{35}	—	November 16, 2006	Kitt Peak	Spacewatch	·	450 m	MPC · JPL
613681	2006 WY_{59}	—	November 17, 2006	Mount Lemmon	Mount Lemmon Survey	NYS	850 m	MPC · JPL
613682	2006 WD_{74}	—	November 18, 2006	Kitt Peak	Spacewatch	·	670 m	MPC · JPL
613683	2006 WO_{75}	—	November 18, 2006	Kitt Peak	Spacewatch	·	1.2 km	MPC · JPL
613684	2006 WV_{91}	—	November 19, 2006	Kitt Peak	Spacewatch	·	1.2 km	MPC · JPL
613685	2006 WY_{91}	—	November 19, 2006	Kitt Peak	Spacewatch	·	960 m	MPC · JPL
613686	2006 WU_{95}	—	November 19, 2006	Kitt Peak	Spacewatch	·	510 m	MPC · JPL
613687	2006 WH_{103}	—	November 19, 2006	Kitt Peak	Spacewatch	·	890 m	MPC · JPL
613688	2006 WM_{104}	—	November 19, 2006	Kitt Peak	Spacewatch	·	1.2 km	MPC · JPL
613689	2006 WW_{105}	—	November 19, 2006	Kitt Peak	Spacewatch	·	770 m	MPC · JPL
613690	2006 WO_{128}	—	November 26, 2006	7300	W. K. Y. Yeung	·	2.3 km	MPC · JPL
613691	2006 WY_{165}	—	November 23, 2006	Kitt Peak	Spacewatch	·	540 m	MPC · JPL
613692	2006 WA_{181}	—	November 24, 2006	Mount Lemmon	Mount Lemmon Survey	·	530 m	MPC · JPL
613693	2006 WW_{190}	—	November 25, 2006	Kitt Peak	Spacewatch	·	1.3 km	MPC · JPL
613694	2006 XQ_{42}	—	December 12, 2006	Mount Lemmon	Mount Lemmon Survey	·	890 m	MPC · JPL
613695	2006 XQ_{62}	—	December 15, 2006	Kitt Peak	Spacewatch	NEM	1.9 km	MPC · JPL
613696	2006 XZ_{67}	—	December 5, 2006	Palomar	NEAT	·	990 m	MPC · JPL
613697	2006 XN_{68}	—	December 13, 2006	Socorro	LINEAR	·	760 m	MPC · JPL
613698	2006 YU_{11}	—	December 18, 2006	Mount Nyukasa	Japan Aerospace Exploration Agency	·	1.5 km	MPC · JPL
613699	2006 YS_{13}	—	December 24, 2006	Kitt Peak	Spacewatch	·	1.8 km	MPC · JPL
613700	2006 YN_{53}	—	December 24, 2006	Kitt Peak	Spacewatch	·	1.3 km	MPC · JPL

== 613701–613800 ==
back to top

Designation			Discovery			Properties		Ref
Permanent	Provisional	Named after	Date	Site	Discoverer(s)	Category	Diam.	Ref
613701	2007 AG_{15}	—	January 10, 2007	Mount Lemmon	Mount Lemmon Survey	·	2.2 km	MPC · JPL
613702	2007 AX_{19}	—	January 10, 2007	Kitt Peak	Spacewatch	PHO	590 m	MPC · JPL
613703	2007 BB_{3}	—	January 16, 2007	Catalina	CSS	PHO	1.1 km	MPC · JPL
613704	2007 BC_{35}	—	January 24, 2007	Mount Lemmon	Mount Lemmon Survey	·	1.2 km	MPC · JPL
613705	2007 BO_{39}	—	January 24, 2007	Mount Lemmon	Mount Lemmon Survey	·	500 m	MPC · JPL
613706	2007 BF_{54}	—	January 24, 2007	Kitt Peak	Spacewatch	·	1.6 km	MPC · JPL
613707	2007 CS_{24}	—	February 8, 2007	Mount Lemmon	Mount Lemmon Survey	HNS	1.1 km	MPC · JPL
613708	2007 CT_{42}	—	February 7, 2007	Mount Lemmon	Mount Lemmon Survey	·	660 m	MPC · JPL
613709	2007 CM_{57}	—	February 9, 2007	Catalina	CSS	T_{j} (2.86) · critical	6.5 km	MPC · JPL
613710	2007 DQ_{7}	—	February 19, 2007	Catalina	CSS	·	1.9 km	MPC · JPL
613711	2007 DX_{14}	—	February 17, 2007	Kitt Peak	Spacewatch	·	720 m	MPC · JPL
613712	2007 DD_{22}	—	February 17, 2007	Kitt Peak	Spacewatch	·	740 m	MPC · JPL
613713	2007 DC_{26}	—	February 17, 2007	Kitt Peak	Spacewatch	·	620 m	MPC · JPL
613714	2007 DL_{41}	—	February 23, 2007	Mount Lemmon	Mount Lemmon Survey	APO · PHA	240 m	MPC · JPL
613715	2007 DC_{45}	—	February 19, 2007	Mount Lemmon	Mount Lemmon Survey	(1547)	1.1 km	MPC · JPL
613716	2007 DA_{46}	—	February 21, 2007	Mount Lemmon	Mount Lemmon Survey	·	1.3 km	MPC · JPL
613717	2007 DP_{50}	—	February 17, 2007	Kitt Peak	Spacewatch	T_{j} (2.85) · unusual	7.0 km	MPC · JPL
613718	2007 DS_{61}	—	February 20, 2007	Lulin	LUSS	·	640 m	MPC · JPL
613719	2007 DW_{64}	—	February 21, 2007	Kitt Peak	Spacewatch	·	630 m	MPC · JPL
613720	2007 DP_{72}	—	February 21, 2007	Kitt Peak	Spacewatch	·	1.3 km	MPC · JPL
613721	2007 DP_{84}	—	February 22, 2007	Calvin-Rehoboth	Calvin College	·	1.8 km	MPC · JPL
613722	2007 DB_{109}	—	February 21, 2007	Mount Lemmon	Mount Lemmon Survey	·	1.7 km	MPC · JPL
613723	2007 DJ_{111}	—	February 25, 2007	Mount Lemmon	Mount Lemmon Survey	·	1.5 km	MPC · JPL
613724	2007 DC_{114}	—	February 25, 2007	Kitt Peak	Spacewatch	·	700 m	MPC · JPL
613725	2007 DG_{117}	—	February 16, 2007	Mount Lemmon	Mount Lemmon Survey	·	2.6 km	MPC · JPL
613726	2007 EF	—	March 9, 2007	Mount Lemmon	Mount Lemmon Survey	ATE · PHA	260 m	MPC · JPL
613727	2007 EX_{2}	—	March 9, 2007	Catalina	CSS	·	1.6 km	MPC · JPL
613728	2007 EP_{5}	—	March 9, 2007	Mount Lemmon	Mount Lemmon Survey	·	690 m	MPC · JPL
613729	2007 EZ_{26}	—	March 10, 2007	Mount Lemmon	Mount Lemmon Survey	·	4.1 km	MPC · JPL
613730	2007 EB_{30}	—	March 9, 2007	Kitt Peak	Spacewatch	NYS	1.0 km	MPC · JPL
613731	2007 EQ_{56}	—	March 12, 2007	Kitt Peak	Spacewatch	·	1.1 km	MPC · JPL
613732	2007 EE_{139}	—	March 12, 2007	Kitt Peak	Spacewatch	·	650 m	MPC · JPL
613733	2007 EN_{147}	—	March 12, 2007	Mount Lemmon	Mount Lemmon Survey	NYS	910 m	MPC · JPL
613734	2007 EH_{148}	—	March 12, 2007	Mount Lemmon	Mount Lemmon Survey	V	490 m	MPC · JPL
613735	2007 EA_{149}	—	March 12, 2007	Mount Lemmon	Mount Lemmon Survey	·	460 m	MPC · JPL
613736	2007 EV_{172}	—	March 14, 2007	Kitt Peak	Spacewatch	·	920 m	MPC · JPL
613737	2007 EZ_{216}	—	March 9, 2007	Mount Lemmon	Mount Lemmon Survey	·	900 m	MPC · JPL
613738	2007 FM_{3}	—	March 19, 2007	Catalina	CSS	·	1.2 km	MPC · JPL
613739	2007 FX_{7}	—	March 16, 2007	Mount Lemmon	Mount Lemmon Survey	·	890 m	MPC · JPL
613740	2007 FZ_{19}	—	March 20, 2007	Mount Lemmon	Mount Lemmon Survey	·	2.4 km	MPC · JPL
613741	2007 FO_{21}	—	March 20, 2007	Mount Lemmon	Mount Lemmon Survey	(5)	810 m	MPC · JPL
613742	2007 FR_{27}	—	March 20, 2007	Mount Lemmon	Mount Lemmon Survey	·	1.2 km	MPC · JPL
613743	2007 GZ_{17}	—	April 11, 2007	Kitt Peak	Spacewatch	·	1.3 km	MPC · JPL
613744	2007 GK_{47}	—	April 14, 2007	Kitt Peak	Spacewatch	·	490 m	MPC · JPL
613745	2007 GF_{61}	—	April 15, 2007	Kitt Peak	Spacewatch	·	1.6 km	MPC · JPL
613746	2007 GE_{62}	—	April 15, 2007	Kitt Peak	Spacewatch	·	770 m	MPC · JPL
613747	2007 GF_{75}	—	April 13, 2007	Mayhill	Lowe, A.	·	510 m	MPC · JPL
613748	2007 GU_{76}	—	April 11, 2007	Catalina	CSS	·	1.8 km	MPC · JPL
613749	2007 HA_{4}	—	April 17, 2007	Pises	Pises	·	640 m	MPC · JPL
613750	2007 HD_{5}	—	April 19, 2007	Pla D'Arguines	R. Ferrando	·	1.3 km	MPC · JPL
613751	2007 HS_{24}	—	April 18, 2007	Kitt Peak	Spacewatch	·	1.8 km	MPC · JPL
613752	2007 HF_{26}	—	April 18, 2007	Mount Lemmon	Mount Lemmon Survey	NYS	540 m	MPC · JPL
613753	2007 HR_{32}	—	April 19, 2007	Kitt Peak	Spacewatch	·	1.2 km	MPC · JPL
613754	2007 HQ_{95}	—	April 18, 2007	Kitt Peak	Spacewatch	·	910 m	MPC · JPL
613755	2007 JE_{16}	—	May 11, 2007	Mount Lemmon	Mount Lemmon Survey	BAR	1.2 km	MPC · JPL
613756	2007 JJ_{18}	—	May 9, 2007	Mount Lemmon	Mount Lemmon Survey	·	850 m	MPC · JPL
613757	2007 JG_{28}	—	May 10, 2007	Kitt Peak	Spacewatch	T_{j} (2.99)	3.4 km	MPC · JPL
613758	2007 JT_{34}	—	May 9, 2007	Anderson Mesa	LONEOS	H	550 m	MPC · JPL
613759	2007 LJ_{3}	—	June 8, 2007	Kitt Peak	Spacewatch	·	1.8 km	MPC · JPL
613760	2007 LR_{6}	—	June 8, 2007	Kitt Peak	Spacewatch	BRA	1.5 km	MPC · JPL
613761	2007 LN_{15}	—	June 7, 2007	Kitt Peak	Spacewatch	EUP	2.2 km	MPC · JPL
613762	2007 MQ_{10}	—	June 21, 2007	Mount Lemmon	Mount Lemmon Survey	·	1.0 km	MPC · JPL
613763	2007 ML_{13}	—	June 22, 2007	Catalina	CSS	AMO	320 m	MPC · JPL
613764	2007 MW_{17}	—	June 21, 2007	Kitt Peak	Spacewatch	(5)	980 m	MPC · JPL
613765	2007 NR_{2}	—	July 14, 2007	Marly	P. Kocher	·	1.3 km	MPC · JPL
613766	2007 NC_{7}	—	July 11, 2007	Palomar Mountain	M. E. Schwamb, M. E. Brown, D. Rabinowitz	centaur	115 km	MPC · JPL
613767	2007 PQ_{27}	—	August 14, 2007	Pla D'Arguines	R. Ferrando	·	950 m	MPC · JPL
613768	2007 PU_{31}	—	August 8, 2007	Socorro	LINEAR	(5)	1.1 km	MPC · JPL
613769	2007 QM_{4}	—	August 31, 2007	Siding Spring	K. Sárneczky, L. Kiss	DOR	2.4 km	MPC · JPL
613770	2007 QL_{13}	—	August 24, 2007	Kitt Peak	Spacewatch	·	1.9 km	MPC · JPL
613771	2007 QO_{14}	—	August 23, 2007	Kitt Peak	Spacewatch	·	1.0 km	MPC · JPL
613772	2007 RM	—	September 1, 2007	Siding Spring	K. Sárneczky, L. Kiss	·	1.1 km	MPC · JPL
613773	2007 RE_{6}	—	September 5, 2007	Dauban	Chante-Perdrix	(5)	1.2 km	MPC · JPL
613774	2007 RL_{12}	—	September 11, 2007	Kitt Peak	Spacewatch	·	1.1 km	MPC · JPL
613775	2007 RU_{12}	—	September 12, 2007	Catalina	CSS	AMO	340 m	MPC · JPL
613776	2007 RJ_{16}	—	September 13, 2007	Altschwendt	W. Ries	·	1.6 km	MPC · JPL
613777	2007 RP_{20}	—	September 3, 2007	Catalina	CSS	·	530 m	MPC · JPL
613778	2007 RC_{21}	—	September 3, 2007	Catalina	CSS	·	960 m	MPC · JPL
613779	2007 RW_{30}	—	September 5, 2007	Catalina	CSS	·	800 m	MPC · JPL
613780	2007 RO_{37}	—	September 8, 2007	Anderson Mesa	LONEOS	·	1.1 km	MPC · JPL
613781	2007 RR_{43}	—	September 9, 2007	Kitt Peak	Spacewatch	·	470 m	MPC · JPL
613782	2007 RE_{58}	—	September 9, 2007	Anderson Mesa	LONEOS	·	2.2 km	MPC · JPL
613783	2007 RB_{63}	—	September 10, 2007	Mount Lemmon	Mount Lemmon Survey	3:2 · SHU	4.2 km	MPC · JPL
613784	2007 RP_{63}	—	September 10, 2007	Mount Lemmon	Mount Lemmon Survey	NYS	1.1 km	MPC · JPL
613785	2007 RR_{71}	—	September 10, 2007	Kitt Peak	Spacewatch	·	1.3 km	MPC · JPL
613786	2007 RP_{99}	—	September 11, 2007	Kitt Peak	Spacewatch	·	2.4 km	MPC · JPL
613787	2007 RK_{114}	—	September 11, 2007	Kitt Peak	Spacewatch	·	2.4 km	MPC · JPL
613788	2007 RE_{118}	—	September 11, 2007	Kitt Peak	Spacewatch	·	740 m	MPC · JPL
613789	2007 RT_{119}	—	September 11, 2007	XuYi	PMO NEO Survey Program	·	620 m	MPC · JPL
613790	2007 RE_{143}	—	September 14, 2007	Socorro	LINEAR	·	2.2 km	MPC · JPL
613791	2007 RA_{151}	—	September 9, 2007	Mount Lemmon	Mount Lemmon Survey	·	1.6 km	MPC · JPL
613792	2007 RF_{151}	—	September 10, 2007	Kitt Peak	Spacewatch	·	1.4 km	MPC · JPL
613793	2007 RX_{155}	—	September 10, 2007	Mount Lemmon	Mount Lemmon Survey	·	1.6 km	MPC · JPL
613794	2007 RT_{160}	—	September 12, 2007	Mount Lemmon	Mount Lemmon Survey	·	2.4 km	MPC · JPL
613795	2007 RK_{166}	—	September 10, 2007	Kitt Peak	Spacewatch	MAS	620 m	MPC · JPL
613796	2007 RZ_{175}	—	September 8, 2007	Mount Lemmon	Mount Lemmon Survey	PHO	2.2 km	MPC · JPL
613797	2007 RT_{184}	—	September 13, 2007	Mount Lemmon	Mount Lemmon Survey	·	1.2 km	MPC · JPL
613798	2007 RK_{185}	—	September 13, 2007	Mount Lemmon	Mount Lemmon Survey	L4	6.0 km	MPC · JPL
613799	2007 RS_{204}	—	September 9, 2007	Kitt Peak	Spacewatch	V	590 m	MPC · JPL
613800	2007 RO_{207}	—	September 10, 2007	Kitt Peak	Spacewatch	·	650 m	MPC · JPL

== 613801–613900 ==
back to top

Designation			Discovery			Properties		Ref
Permanent	Provisional	Named after	Date	Site	Discoverer(s)	Category	Diam.	Ref
613801	2007 RE_{210}	—	September 10, 2007	Kitt Peak	Spacewatch	·	1 km	MPC · JPL
613802	2007 RD_{219}	—	September 14, 2007	Mount Lemmon	Mount Lemmon Survey	JUN	1.9 km	MPC · JPL
613803	2007 RZ_{223}	—	September 10, 2007	Kitt Peak	Spacewatch	·	520 m	MPC · JPL
613804	2007 RA_{226}	—	September 10, 2007	Kitt Peak	Spacewatch	EOS	1.7 km	MPC · JPL
613805	2007 RM_{237}	—	September 14, 2007	Kitt Peak	Spacewatch	·	520 m	MPC · JPL
613806	2007 RE_{256}	—	September 14, 2007	Kitt Peak	Spacewatch	·	1.0 km	MPC · JPL
613807	2007 RU_{258}	—	September 14, 2007	Mount Lemmon	Mount Lemmon Survey	·	520 m	MPC · JPL
613808	2007 RD_{293}	—	September 13, 2007	Mount Lemmon	Mount Lemmon Survey	·	3.6 km	MPC · JPL
613809	2007 RL_{298}	—	September 9, 2007	Kitt Peak	Spacewatch	·	430 m	MPC · JPL
613810	2007 RQ_{298}	—	September 10, 2007	Kitt Peak	Spacewatch	·	1.6 km	MPC · JPL
613811	2007 RB_{301}	—	September 12, 2007	Mount Lemmon	Mount Lemmon Survey	·	1.0 km	MPC · JPL
613812	2007 RS_{324}	—	September 11, 2007	Kitt Peak	Spacewatch	·	460 m	MPC · JPL
613813 Svevastallone	2007 SB_{1}	Svevastallone	September 19, 2007	Saint-Barthelemy	Carbognani, A.	·	1.5 km	MPC · JPL
613814	2007 SR_{1}	—	September 18, 2007	Kitt Peak	Spacewatch	APO	320 m	MPC · JPL
613815	2007 SS_{13}	—	September 19, 2007	Kitt Peak	Spacewatch	·	1.5 km	MPC · JPL
613816	2007 TR_{4}	—	October 6, 2007	7300	W. K. Y. Yeung	·	1.2 km	MPC · JPL
613817	2007 TA_{11}	—	October 6, 2007	Socorro	LINEAR	·	640 m	MPC · JPL
613818	2007 TG_{28}	—	October 4, 2007	Kitt Peak	Spacewatch	(2076)	650 m	MPC · JPL
613819	2007 TF_{33}	—	October 6, 2007	Kitt Peak	Spacewatch	·	950 m	MPC · JPL
613820	2007 TK_{37}	—	October 4, 2007	Catalina	CSS	·	540 m	MPC · JPL
613821	2007 TE_{40}	—	October 6, 2007	Kitt Peak	Spacewatch	·	640 m	MPC · JPL
613822	2007 TD_{43}	—	October 7, 2007	Mount Lemmon	Mount Lemmon Survey	·	1 km	MPC · JPL
613823	2007 TH_{48}	—	October 4, 2007	Kitt Peak	Spacewatch	NYS	930 m	MPC · JPL
613824	2007 TF_{52}	—	October 4, 2007	Kitt Peak	Spacewatch	·	560 m	MPC · JPL
613825	2007 TQ_{57}	—	October 4, 2007	Kitt Peak	Spacewatch	·	800 m	MPC · JPL
613826	2007 TZ_{57}	—	October 4, 2007	Kitt Peak	Spacewatch	MAS	550 m	MPC · JPL
613827	2007 TY_{63}	—	October 7, 2007	Mount Lemmon	Mount Lemmon Survey	THM	1.9 km	MPC · JPL
613828	2007 TG_{65}	—	October 7, 2007	Mount Lemmon	Mount Lemmon Survey	·	550 m	MPC · JPL
613829	2007 TE_{66}	—	October 12, 2007	Mount Lemmon	Mount Lemmon Survey	APO	170 m	MPC · JPL
613830	2007 TP_{76}	—	October 5, 2007	Kitt Peak	Spacewatch	·	760 m	MPC · JPL
613831	2007 TP_{102}	—	October 8, 2007	Mount Lemmon	Mount Lemmon Survey	·	780 m	MPC · JPL
613832	2007 TZ_{115}	—	October 8, 2007	Mount Lemmon	Mount Lemmon Survey	KOR	1.1 km	MPC · JPL
613833	2007 TY_{123}	—	October 6, 2007	Kitt Peak	Spacewatch	LIX	2.3 km	MPC · JPL
613834	2007 TV_{126}	—	October 6, 2007	Kitt Peak	Spacewatch	·	690 m	MPC · JPL
613835	2007 TQ_{131}	—	October 7, 2007	Mount Lemmon	Mount Lemmon Survey	·	1.1 km	MPC · JPL
613836	2007 TG_{134}	—	October 7, 2007	Mount Lemmon	Mount Lemmon Survey	·	1.0 km	MPC · JPL
613837	2007 TD_{176}	—	October 5, 2007	Kitt Peak	Spacewatch	·	990 m	MPC · JPL
613838	2007 TK_{185}	—	October 13, 2007	Socorro	LINEAR	·	1.1 km	MPC · JPL
613839	2007 TA_{202}	—	October 8, 2007	Mount Lemmon	Mount Lemmon Survey	·	1.0 km	MPC · JPL
613840	2007 TH_{219}	—	October 8, 2007	Mount Lemmon	Mount Lemmon Survey	·	630 m	MPC · JPL
613841	2007 TQ_{226}	—	October 8, 2007	Kitt Peak	Spacewatch	·	520 m	MPC · JPL
613842	2007 TA_{261}	—	October 10, 2007	Kitt Peak	Spacewatch	MAS	690 m	MPC · JPL
613843	2007 TZ_{262}	—	October 10, 2007	Kitt Peak	Spacewatch	MAS	690 m	MPC · JPL
613844	2007 TD_{267}	—	October 9, 2007	Kitt Peak	Spacewatch	MAS	610 m	MPC · JPL
613845	2007 TA_{277}	—	October 11, 2007	Mount Lemmon	Mount Lemmon Survey	·	1.3 km	MPC · JPL
613846	2007 TX_{282}	—	October 8, 2007	Anderson Mesa	LONEOS	·	1.5 km	MPC · JPL
613847	2007 TC_{294}	—	October 9, 2007	Mount Lemmon	Mount Lemmon Survey	JUN	860 m	MPC · JPL
613848	2007 TG_{313}	—	October 11, 2007	Mount Lemmon	Mount Lemmon Survey	·	790 m	MPC · JPL
613849	2007 TJ_{333}	—	October 11, 2007	Kitt Peak	Spacewatch	·	1.3 km	MPC · JPL
613850	2007 TM_{334}	—	October 11, 2007	Kitt Peak	Spacewatch	·	570 m	MPC · JPL
613851	2007 TS_{342}	—	October 10, 2007	Mount Lemmon	Mount Lemmon Survey	·	720 m	MPC · JPL
613852	2007 TO_{361}	—	October 14, 2007	Mount Lemmon	Mount Lemmon Survey	·	940 m	MPC · JPL
613853	2007 TG_{362}	—	October 14, 2007	Mount Lemmon	Mount Lemmon Survey	·	500 m	MPC · JPL
613854	2007 TU_{382}	—	October 14, 2007	Kitt Peak	Spacewatch	·	1.0 km	MPC · JPL
613855	2007 TS_{403}	—	October 15, 2007	Kitt Peak	Spacewatch	·	1.0 km	MPC · JPL
613856	2007 TL_{412}	—	October 14, 2007	Catalina	CSS	THB	2.7 km	MPC · JPL
613857	2007 TZ_{417}	—	October 4, 2007	Cerro Tololo	ESSENCE Collaboration	cubewano (hot)	150 km	MPC · JPL
613858	2007 TA_{418}	—	October 4, 2007	Cerro Tololo	ESSENCE Collaboration	SDO	134 km	MPC · JPL
613859	2007 TJ_{425}	—	October 8, 2007	Mount Lemmon	Mount Lemmon Survey	·	760 m	MPC · JPL
613860	2007 TV_{425}	—	October 8, 2007	Mount Lemmon	Mount Lemmon Survey	·	4.2 km	MPC · JPL
613861	2007 TC_{444}	—	October 4, 2007	Kitt Peak	Spacewatch	·	730 m	MPC · JPL
613862	2007 UY_{1}	—	October 18, 2007	Catalina	CSS	ATE	90 m	MPC · JPL
613863	2007 UV_{6}	—	October 22, 2007	Gnosca	S. Sposetti	·	850 m	MPC · JPL
613864	2007 UZ_{18}	—	October 18, 2007	Mount Lemmon	Mount Lemmon Survey	·	1.9 km	MPC · JPL
613865	2007 UJ_{22}	—	October 16, 2007	Kitt Peak	Spacewatch	·	780 m	MPC · JPL
613866	2007 UO_{38}	—	October 20, 2007	Catalina	CSS	·	1.3 km	MPC · JPL
613867	2007 UA_{43}	—	October 18, 2007	Kitt Peak	Spacewatch	·	1.1 km	MPC · JPL
613868	2007 UV_{53}	—	October 30, 2007	Kitt Peak	Spacewatch	·	860 m	MPC · JPL
613869	2007 UW_{63}	—	October 30, 2007	Mount Lemmon	Mount Lemmon Survey	·	1.2 km	MPC · JPL
613870	2007 US_{79}	—	October 30, 2007	Mount Lemmon	Mount Lemmon Survey	KOR	1.1 km	MPC · JPL
613871	2007 UW_{91}	—	October 30, 2007	Mount Lemmon	Mount Lemmon Survey	·	580 m	MPC · JPL
613872	2007 UO_{103}	—	October 30, 2007	Kitt Peak	Spacewatch	·	530 m	MPC · JPL
613873	2007 UR_{121}	—	October 31, 2007	Mount Lemmon	Mount Lemmon Survey	·	1.2 km	MPC · JPL
613874	2007 UQ_{140}	—	October 18, 2007	Mount Lemmon	Mount Lemmon Survey	·	1.9 km	MPC · JPL
613875	2007 VS_{16}	—	November 1, 2007	Mount Lemmon	Mount Lemmon Survey	·	610 m	MPC · JPL
613876	2007 VG_{18}	—	November 1, 2007	Mount Lemmon	Mount Lemmon Survey	·	1.0 km	MPC · JPL
613877	2007 VC_{20}	—	November 1, 2007	Kitt Peak	Spacewatch	·	1.1 km	MPC · JPL
613878	2007 VX_{26}	—	November 2, 2007	Mount Lemmon	Mount Lemmon Survey	·	690 m	MPC · JPL
613879	2007 VD_{67}	—	November 2, 2007	Kitt Peak	Spacewatch	·	650 m	MPC · JPL
613880	2007 VQ_{74}	—	November 3, 2007	Kitt Peak	Spacewatch	·	480 m	MPC · JPL
613881	2007 VR_{75}	—	November 3, 2007	Kitt Peak	Spacewatch	·	2.2 km	MPC · JPL
613882	2007 VP_{83}	—	November 4, 2007	Kitt Peak	Spacewatch	H	460 m	MPC · JPL
613883	2007 VT_{84}	—	November 2, 2007	Mount Lemmon	Mount Lemmon Survey	H	500 m	MPC · JPL
613884	2007 VM_{96}	—	November 1, 2007	Kitt Peak	Spacewatch	·	1.3 km	MPC · JPL
613885	2007 VC_{104}	—	November 3, 2007	Kitt Peak	Spacewatch	·	860 m	MPC · JPL
613886	2007 VN_{106}	—	November 3, 2007	Kitt Peak	Spacewatch	·	1.6 km	MPC · JPL
613887	2007 VC_{110}	—	November 3, 2007	Kitt Peak	Spacewatch	·	510 m	MPC · JPL
613888	2007 VF_{110}	—	November 3, 2007	Kitt Peak	Spacewatch	MAS	520 m	MPC · JPL
613889	2007 VX_{120}	—	November 5, 2007	Kitt Peak	Spacewatch	·	1.4 km	MPC · JPL
613890	2007 VY_{122}	—	November 5, 2007	Mount Lemmon	Mount Lemmon Survey	·	920 m	MPC · JPL
613891	2007 VD_{123}	—	November 5, 2007	Mount Lemmon	Mount Lemmon Survey	EOS	1.5 km	MPC · JPL
613892	2007 VR_{129}	—	November 1, 2007	Mount Lemmon	Mount Lemmon Survey	MAS	630 m	MPC · JPL
613893	2007 VV_{142}	—	November 4, 2007	Kitt Peak	Spacewatch	·	570 m	MPC · JPL
613894	2007 VL_{148}	—	November 5, 2007	Kitt Peak	Spacewatch	·	610 m	MPC · JPL
613895	2007 VL_{149}	—	November 7, 2007	Catalina	CSS	·	750 m	MPC · JPL
613896	2007 VV_{153}	—	November 4, 2007	Kitt Peak	Spacewatch	·	810 m	MPC · JPL
613897	2007 VQ_{155}	—	November 5, 2007	Kitt Peak	Spacewatch	EOS	1.8 km	MPC · JPL
613898	2007 VJ_{159}	—	November 5, 2007	Kitt Peak	Spacewatch	·	1.3 km	MPC · JPL
613899	2007 VD_{171}	—	November 7, 2007	Kitt Peak	Spacewatch	KON	1.6 km	MPC · JPL
613900	2007 VU_{171}	—	November 7, 2007	Kitt Peak	Spacewatch	·	490 m	MPC · JPL

== 613901–614000 ==
back to top

Designation			Discovery			Properties		Ref
Permanent	Provisional	Named after	Date	Site	Discoverer(s)	Category	Diam.	Ref
613901	2007 VD_{198}	—	November 8, 2007	Mount Lemmon	Mount Lemmon Survey	NYS	1.0 km	MPC · JPL
613902	2007 VO_{199}	—	November 9, 2007	Mount Lemmon	Mount Lemmon Survey	MAS	600 m	MPC · JPL
613903	2007 VF_{209}	—	November 7, 2007	Kitt Peak	Spacewatch	(29841)	1.3 km	MPC · JPL
613904	2007 VO_{247}	—	November 13, 2007	Mount Lemmon	Mount Lemmon Survey	·	1.9 km	MPC · JPL
613905	2007 VJ_{272}	—	November 11, 2007	Mount Lemmon	Mount Lemmon Survey	·	1.1 km	MPC · JPL
613906	2007 VC_{281}	—	November 14, 2007	Kitt Peak	Spacewatch	·	1.0 km	MPC · JPL
613907	2007 VG_{283}	—	November 14, 2007	Kitt Peak	Spacewatch	·	980 m	MPC · JPL
613908	2007 VK_{305}	—	November 2, 2007	Apache Point	Apache Point	SDO	196 km	MPC · JPL
613909	2007 VN_{329}	—	November 15, 2007	Socorro	LINEAR	·	1.6 km	MPC · JPL
613910	2007 WB_{5}	—	November 20, 2007	Mount Lemmon	Mount Lemmon Survey	APO	540 m	MPC · JPL
613911	2007 WM_{18}	—	November 18, 2007	Mount Lemmon	Mount Lemmon Survey	·	520 m	MPC · JPL
613912	2007 WA_{46}	—	November 20, 2007	Mount Lemmon	Mount Lemmon Survey	·	600 m	MPC · JPL
613913	2007 XB_{10}	—	December 5, 2007	Kitt Peak	Spacewatch	APO +1km	990 m	MPC · JPL
613914	2007 XK_{10}	—	December 5, 2007	Bisei SG Center	BATTeRS	·	1.0 km	MPC · JPL
613915	2007 XS_{16}	—	December 10, 2007	Great Shefford	Birtwhistle, P.	·	910 m	MPC · JPL
613916	2007 XM_{28}	—	December 15, 2007	Kitt Peak	Spacewatch	·	950 m	MPC · JPL
613917	2007 XD_{52}	—	December 5, 2007	Kitt Peak	Spacewatch	·	980 m	MPC · JPL
613918	2007 YK_{1}	—	December 17, 2007	Catalina	CSS	T_{j} (2.61) · fast?	5.5 km	MPC · JPL
613919	2007 YO_{1}	—	December 17, 2007	Mount Lemmon	Mount Lemmon Survey	·	1.7 km	MPC · JPL
613920	2007 YB_{33}	—	December 28, 2007	Kitt Peak	Spacewatch	·	710 m	MPC · JPL
613921	2007 YR_{49}	—	December 28, 2007	Kitt Peak	Spacewatch	·	1.4 km	MPC · JPL
613922	2007 YX_{54}	—	December 31, 2007	Catalina	CSS	·	1.6 km	MPC · JPL
613923	2007 YA_{58}	—	December 30, 2007	Mount Lemmon	Mount Lemmon Survey	·	2.7 km	MPC · JPL
613924	2007 YT_{61}	—	December 30, 2007	Mount Lemmon	Mount Lemmon Survey	THB	2.3 km	MPC · JPL
613925	2007 YX_{62}	—	December 30, 2007	Mount Lemmon	Mount Lemmon Survey	·	810 m	MPC · JPL
613926	2007 YC_{66}	—	December 30, 2007	Mount Lemmon	Mount Lemmon Survey	·	2.7 km	MPC · JPL
613927	2008 AS_{15}	—	January 10, 2008	Mount Lemmon	Mount Lemmon Survey	·	1.4 km	MPC · JPL
613928	2008 AO_{35}	—	January 10, 2008	Kitt Peak	Spacewatch	(194)	1.3 km	MPC · JPL
613929	2008 AS_{35}	—	January 10, 2008	Kitt Peak	Spacewatch	·	1.5 km	MPC · JPL
613930	2008 AU_{40}	—	January 10, 2008	Mount Lemmon	Mount Lemmon Survey	·	800 m	MPC · JPL
613931	2008 AF_{44}	—	January 10, 2008	Kitt Peak	Spacewatch	·	1.1 km	MPC · JPL
613932	2008 AW_{55}	—	January 11, 2008	Kitt Peak	Spacewatch	·	880 m	MPC · JPL
613933	2008 AW_{104}	—	January 15, 2008	Kitt Peak	Spacewatch	·	900 m	MPC · JPL
613934	2008 AU_{114}	—	January 14, 2008	Kitt Peak	Spacewatch	·	1.0 km	MPC · JPL
613935	2008 BT_{44}	—	January 31, 2008	Catalina	CSS	·	1 km	MPC · JPL
613936	2008 BC_{46}	—	January 30, 2008	Mount Lemmon	Mount Lemmon Survey	MAS	500 m	MPC · JPL
613937	2008 CU_{49}	—	February 6, 2008	Catalina	CSS	·	1.7 km	MPC · JPL
613938	2008 CG_{94}	—	February 8, 2008	Mount Lemmon	Mount Lemmon Survey	·	1.6 km	MPC · JPL
613939	2008 CH_{116}	—	February 9, 2008	Mount Lemmon	Mount Lemmon Survey	ATE	320 m	MPC · JPL
613940	2008 CZ_{118}	—	February 12, 2008	Catalina	CSS	AMO	700 m	MPC · JPL
613941	2008 CF_{131}	—	February 8, 2008	Kitt Peak	Spacewatch	TIR	2.2 km	MPC · JPL
613942	2008 CF_{132}	—	February 8, 2008	Kitt Peak	Spacewatch	3:2	4.2 km	MPC · JPL
613943	2008 CJ_{145}	—	February 9, 2008	Kitt Peak	Spacewatch	·	1.1 km	MPC · JPL
613944	2008 CY_{153}	—	February 9, 2008	Kitt Peak	Spacewatch	·	1.3 km	MPC · JPL
613945	2008 CN_{156}	—	February 9, 2008	Kitt Peak	Spacewatch	·	590 m	MPC · JPL
613946	2008 CW_{156}	—	February 9, 2008	Kitt Peak	Spacewatch	·	1.4 km	MPC · JPL
613947	2008 CF_{161}	—	February 9, 2008	Kitt Peak	Spacewatch	·	1.6 km	MPC · JPL
613948	2008 CR_{164}	—	February 10, 2008	Kitt Peak	Spacewatch	·	780 m	MPC · JPL
613949	2008 CC_{175}	—	February 14, 2008	Catalina	CSS	ATE	180 m	MPC · JPL
613950	2008 CH_{207}	—	February 13, 2008	Mount Lemmon	Mount Lemmon Survey	·	1.5 km	MPC · JPL
613951	2008 CH_{208}	—	February 9, 2008	Kitt Peak	Spacewatch	·	1.8 km	MPC · JPL
613952	2008 CV_{215}	—	February 13, 2008	Kitt Peak	Spacewatch	·	1.1 km	MPC · JPL
613953	2008 DC_{67}	—	February 29, 2008	Kitt Peak	Spacewatch	·	620 m	MPC · JPL
613954	2008 DN_{78}	—	February 28, 2008	Mount Lemmon	Mount Lemmon Survey	·	860 m	MPC · JPL
613955	2008 EO_{7}	—	March 6, 2008	Kitt Peak	Spacewatch	·	300 m	MPC · JPL
613956	2008 EV_{12}	—	March 1, 2008	Kitt Peak	Spacewatch	·	1.1 km	MPC · JPL
613957	2008 EF_{16}	—	March 1, 2008	Kitt Peak	Spacewatch	NYS	900 m	MPC · JPL
613958	2008 EM_{37}	—	March 4, 2008	Kitt Peak	Spacewatch	·	1.8 km	MPC · JPL
613959	2008 EE_{68}	—	March 11, 2008	Mount Lemmon	Mount Lemmon Survey	AMO	270 m	MPC · JPL
613960	2008 EV_{139}	—	March 11, 2008	Kitt Peak	Spacewatch	·	510 m	MPC · JPL
613961	2008 ER_{156}	—	March 10, 2008	Kitt Peak	Spacewatch	LUT	3.4 km	MPC · JPL
613962	2008 EY_{162}	—	March 15, 2008	Mount Lemmon	Mount Lemmon Survey	EOS	1.3 km	MPC · JPL
613963	2008 ET_{164}	—	March 1, 2008	Kitt Peak	Spacewatch	T_{j} (2.98)	2.4 km	MPC · JPL
613964	2008 FN	—	March 27, 2008	Mount Lemmon	Mount Lemmon Survey	APO	700 m	MPC · JPL
613965	2008 FO_{4}	—	March 25, 2008	Kitt Peak	Spacewatch	·	1.8 km	MPC · JPL
613966	2008 FR_{10}	—	March 26, 2008	Kitt Peak	Spacewatch	·	1.3 km	MPC · JPL
613967	2008 FB_{25}	—	March 27, 2008	Kitt Peak	Spacewatch	·	540 m	MPC · JPL
613968	2008 FJ_{33}	—	March 28, 2008	Mount Lemmon	Mount Lemmon Survey	(1547)	990 m	MPC · JPL
613969	2008 FA_{50}	—	March 28, 2008	Mount Lemmon	Mount Lemmon Survey	NYS	910 m	MPC · JPL
613970	2008 FT_{61}	—	March 30, 2008	Mayhill	Dillon, W. G.	·	1.6 km	MPC · JPL
613971	2008 FJ_{99}	—	March 30, 2008	Kitt Peak	Spacewatch	KON	1.5 km	MPC · JPL
613972	2008 FO_{110}	—	March 31, 2008	Mount Lemmon	Mount Lemmon Survey	T_{j} (2.96)	1.9 km	MPC · JPL
613973	2008 FY_{127}	—	March 28, 2008	Mount Lemmon	Mount Lemmon Survey	·	880 m	MPC · JPL
613974	2008 FO_{130}	—	March 30, 2008	Catalina	CSS	·	1.6 km	MPC · JPL
613975	2008 FE_{136}	—	March 26, 2008	Mount Lemmon	Mount Lemmon Survey	·	510 m	MPC · JPL
613976	2008 GQ_{13}	—	April 3, 2008	Mount Lemmon	Mount Lemmon Survey	·	860 m	MPC · JPL
613977	2008 GP_{39}	—	April 4, 2008	Kitt Peak	Spacewatch	·	1.8 km	MPC · JPL
613978	2008 GY_{61}	—	April 5, 2008	Mount Lemmon	Mount Lemmon Survey	·	650 m	MPC · JPL
613979	2008 GQ_{65}	—	April 6, 2008	Kitt Peak	Spacewatch	·	950 m	MPC · JPL
613980	2008 GC_{66}	—	April 6, 2008	Mount Lemmon	Mount Lemmon Survey	·	1.5 km	MPC · JPL
613981	2008 GZ_{102}	—	April 10, 2008	Kitt Peak	Spacewatch	H	450 m	MPC · JPL
613982	2008 GJ_{108}	—	April 13, 2008	Kitt Peak	Spacewatch	·	1.6 km	MPC · JPL
613983	2008 GM_{126}	—	April 14, 2008	Mount Lemmon	Mount Lemmon Survey	·	1.8 km	MPC · JPL
613984	2008 HR_{11}	—	April 24, 2008	Kitt Peak	Spacewatch	·	1.8 km	MPC · JPL
613985	2008 HA_{38}	—	April 30, 2008	Mount Lemmon	Mount Lemmon Survey	AMO	300 m	MPC · JPL
613986	2008 JG	—	May 1, 2008	Catalina	CSS	APO · PHA	240 m	MPC · JPL
613987	2008 JO_{20}	—	May 8, 2008	Mount Lemmon	Mount Lemmon Survey	T_{j} (2.83)	2.0 km	MPC · JPL
613988	2008 KP_{23}	—	May 28, 2008	Kitt Peak	Spacewatch	·	450 m	MPC · JPL
613989	2008 KO_{24}	—	May 28, 2008	Kitt Peak	Spacewatch	T_{j} (2.99) · (895)	3.4 km	MPC · JPL
613990	2008 KC_{29}	—	May 28, 2008	Kitt Peak	Spacewatch	·	2.8 km	MPC · JPL
613991	2008 KL_{35}	—	May 27, 2008	Kitt Peak	Spacewatch	MAS	540 m	MPC · JPL
613992	2008 KR_{35}	—	May 27, 2008	Kitt Peak	Spacewatch	·	1.5 km	MPC · JPL
613993	2008 KK_{41}	—	May 30, 2008	Kitt Peak	Spacewatch	·	520 m	MPC · JPL
613994	2008 KZ_{41}	—	May 31, 2008	Kitt Peak	Spacewatch	·	2.4 km	MPC · JPL
613995	2008 NP_{3}	—	July 14, 2008	Siding Spring	SSS	APO	190 m	MPC · JPL
613996	2008 OO_{22}	—	July 29, 2008	Kitt Peak	Spacewatch	·	790 m	MPC · JPL
613997	2008 OC_{25}	—	July 30, 2008	Kitt Peak	Spacewatch	·	750 m	MPC · JPL
613998	2008 PS_{4}	—	August 5, 2008	Hibiscus	S. F. Hönig, Teamo, N.	(5)	1.1 km	MPC · JPL
613999	2008 PX_{6}	—	August 5, 2008	Vicques	M. Ory	·	700 m	MPC · JPL
614000	2008 PB_{19}	—	August 7, 2008	Kitt Peak	Spacewatch	MIS	1.9 km	MPC · JPL

back to top

== Meaning of names ==
As minor planet discoveries are confirmed, they are given a permanent number by the IAU's Minor Planet Center (MPC), and the discoverers can then submit names for them, following the IAU's naming conventions. The list below concerns those minor planets in the specified number-range that have received names, and explains the meanings of those names.

Official naming citations of newly named small Solar System bodies are approved and published in a bulletin by IAU's Working Group for Small Bodies Nomenclature (WGSBN). Before May 2021, citations were published in MPC's Minor Planet Circulars for many decades. Recent citations can also be found on the JPL Small-Body Database (SBDB). Until his death in 2016, German astronomer Lutz D. Schmadel compiled these citations into the Dictionary of Minor Planet Names (DMP) and regularly updated the collection.

Based on Paul Herget's The Names of the Minor Planets, Schmadel also researched the unclear origin of numerous asteroids, most of which had been named prior to World War II. This article incorporates text from this source, which is in the public domain: SBDB New namings may only be added to this list below after official publication as the preannouncement of names is condemned. The WGSBN publishes a comprehensive guideline for the naming rules of non-cometary small Solar System bodies.

Named minor planet	Provisional	This minor planet was named for...	Ref · Catalog
613279 Isaacmiguel	2005 YV_{53}	Isaac Miguel del Rivero (b. 1957), a Spanish comic-book artist, better known as Isaac del Rivero Jr.	IAU · 613279
613419 Lafayettequartet	2006 JQ_{75}	The Lafayette String Quartet, an all-female ensemble quartet.	IAU · 613419
613813 Svevastallone	2007 SB_{1}	Stallone Sveva (b. 1960), an Italian journalist, blogger and a radio amateur.	IAU · 613813
