= (613766) 2007 NC7 =

Trans-Neptunian object

(613766) 2007 NC_{7}
Discovery
- Discovered by: M. E. Schwamb; M. E. Brown; D. Rabinowitz
- Discovery site: Palomar Obs.
- Discovery date: 11 July 2007

Designations
- Minor planet category: TNO · centaur distant

Orbital characteristics
- Epoch 4 September 2017 (JD 2458000.5)
- Uncertainty parameter 3
- Observation arc: 7.12 yr (2,599 days)
- Aphelion: 51.452 AU
- Perihelion: 16.867 AU
- Semi-major axis: 34.160 AU
- Eccentricity: 0.5062
- Orbital period (sidereal): 199.65 yr (72,924 d)
- Mean anomaly: 37.817°
- Mean motion: 0° 0^{m} 17.64^{s} / day
- Inclination: 6.3015°
- Longitude of ascending node: 324.12°
- Argument of perihelion: 286.77°
- Uranus MOID: 0.35 AU (52.4 million km)
- Neptune MOID: 0.11 AU (16.5 million km)

Physical characteristics
- Dimensions: 106 km (calculated)
- Geometric albedo: 0.09 (assumed)
- Absolute magnitude (H): 8.1

(613766) 2007 NC_{7} is a trans-Neptunian object and centaur from the outer Solar System, approximately 106 kilometers in diameter. It was first observed on 11 July 2007, by American astronomers Megan Schwamb, Michael Brown and David Rabinowitz at Palomar Observatory in California.

The object has a high eccentricity of 0.49. It comes within 17 AU of the Sun (inside the orbit of Uranus) and goes as far as 50 AU at aphelion (near the Kuiper cliff). It passed perihelion in September 1996.

For comparison, among the well-established, highly eccentric orbits formally classified as plutinos, the orbit of (15788) 1993 SB has an eccentricity of 0.318.

It has only been observed twenty-six times over four oppositions.
