= List of minor planets: 437001–438000 =

The following is a partial list of minor planets, running from minor-planet number 437001 through 438000, inclusive. The primary data for this and other partial lists is based on JPL's "Small-Body Orbital Elements" and data available from the Minor Planet Center. Critical list information is also provided by the MPC, unless otherwise specified from Lowell Observatory. A detailed description of the table's columns and additional sources are given on the main page including a complete list of every page in this series, and a statistical break-up on the dynamical classification of minor planets.

Also see the summary list of all named bodies in numerical and alphabetical order, and the corresponding naming citations for the number range of this particular list. New namings may only be added to this list after official publication, as the preannouncement of names is condemned by the Working Group for Small Bodies Nomenclature of the International Astronomical Union.

Near-Earth obj.	MBA (inner)	MBA (outer)	Centaur
Mars-crosser	MBA (middle)	Jupiter trojan	Trans-Neptunian obj.
Unclassified

== 437001–437100 ==
Designation			Discovery			Properties		Ref
Permanent	Provisional	Named after	Date	Site	Discoverer(s)	Category	Diam.	Ref
437001	2012 TX_{225}	—	March 24, 2006	Kitt Peak	Spacewatch	·	1.8 km	MPC · JPL
437002	2012 TT_{227}	—	November 20, 2003	Kitt Peak	Spacewatch	AGN	1.1 km	MPC · JPL
437003	2012 TP_{232}	—	October 31, 2008	Catalina	CSS	·	1.7 km	MPC · JPL
437004	2012 TG_{236}	—	October 16, 2007	Mount Lemmon	Mount Lemmon Survey	(31811)	2.3 km	MPC · JPL
437005	2012 TE_{244}	—	September 11, 2007	Mount Lemmon	Mount Lemmon Survey	·	2.1 km	MPC · JPL
437006	2012 TF_{245}	—	March 11, 2007	Kitt Peak	Spacewatch	·	1.3 km	MPC · JPL
437007	2012 TU_{247}	—	September 4, 2007	Mount Lemmon	Mount Lemmon Survey	·	1.8 km	MPC · JPL
437008	2012 TX_{249}	—	October 21, 2007	Mount Lemmon	Mount Lemmon Survey	EOS	1.7 km	MPC · JPL
437009	2012 TR_{258}	—	December 1, 2008	Kitt Peak	Spacewatch	·	1.9 km	MPC · JPL
437010	2012 TL_{264}	—	October 7, 2007	Catalina	CSS	·	1.9 km	MPC · JPL
437011	2012 TN_{265}	—	May 3, 2006	Kitt Peak	Spacewatch	·	1.9 km	MPC · JPL
437012	2012 TO_{265}	—	April 10, 2010	Kitt Peak	Spacewatch	·	2.8 km	MPC · JPL
437013	2012 TV_{265}	—	October 8, 2012	Mount Lemmon	Mount Lemmon Survey	·	3.0 km	MPC · JPL
437014	2012 TW_{265}	—	September 10, 2007	Mount Lemmon	Mount Lemmon Survey	HOF	3.7 km	MPC · JPL
437015	2012 TE_{266}	—	September 13, 2007	Mount Lemmon	Mount Lemmon Survey	KOR	1.2 km	MPC · JPL
437016	2012 TL_{268}	—	February 3, 2009	Mount Lemmon	Mount Lemmon Survey	·	2.2 km	MPC · JPL
437017	2012 TA_{271}	—	September 25, 2012	Mount Lemmon	Mount Lemmon Survey	·	1.9 km	MPC · JPL
437018	2012 TK_{271}	—	October 29, 2003	Kitt Peak	Spacewatch	·	1.8 km	MPC · JPL
437019	2012 TJ_{273}	—	May 7, 2006	Mount Lemmon	Mount Lemmon Survey	·	1.8 km	MPC · JPL
437020	2012 TW_{273}	—	September 12, 2007	Mount Lemmon	Mount Lemmon Survey	KOR	1.2 km	MPC · JPL
437021	2012 TY_{284}	—	November 16, 2007	Mount Lemmon	Mount Lemmon Survey	EOS	1.9 km	MPC · JPL
437022	2012 TY_{289}	—	September 20, 2001	Socorro	LINEAR	·	2.8 km	MPC · JPL
437023	2012 TN_{291}	—	January 31, 2009	Kitt Peak	Spacewatch	·	1.6 km	MPC · JPL
437024	2012 TV_{293}	—	September 18, 2006	Kitt Peak	Spacewatch	VER	3.0 km	MPC · JPL
437025	2012 TP_{294}	—	October 22, 2003	Kitt Peak	Spacewatch	·	2.1 km	MPC · JPL
437026	2012 TV_{294}	—	October 18, 1998	Kitt Peak	Spacewatch	·	2.4 km	MPC · JPL
437027	2012 TY_{294}	—	October 6, 2012	Kitt Peak	Spacewatch	·	2.9 km	MPC · JPL
437028	2012 TV_{295}	—	October 21, 2008	Kitt Peak	Spacewatch	(5)	1.3 km	MPC · JPL
437029	2012 TA_{297}	—	October 30, 2005	Mount Lemmon	Mount Lemmon Survey	·	1.0 km	MPC · JPL
437030	2012 TB_{299}	—	August 24, 2007	Kitt Peak	Spacewatch	AGN	1.1 km	MPC · JPL
437031	2012 TJ_{301}	—	October 10, 2007	Mount Lemmon	Mount Lemmon Survey	·	3.2 km	MPC · JPL
437032	2012 TV_{302}	—	September 18, 2012	Kitt Peak	Spacewatch	·	1.8 km	MPC · JPL
437033	2012 TH_{306}	—	September 22, 2012	Kitt Peak	Spacewatch	·	3.0 km	MPC · JPL
437034	2012 TM_{307}	—	March 2, 2006	Kitt Peak	Spacewatch	·	1.6 km	MPC · JPL
437035	2012 TN_{307}	—	December 7, 1999	Socorro	LINEAR	·	2.2 km	MPC · JPL
437036	2012 TU_{309}	—	October 25, 2008	Kitt Peak	Spacewatch	(5)	1.2 km	MPC · JPL
437037	2012 TS_{310}	—	October 6, 1999	Socorro	LINEAR	EUN	1.5 km	MPC · JPL
437038	2012 TV_{311}	—	October 22, 2008	Kitt Peak	Spacewatch	EUN	1.5 km	MPC · JPL
437039	2012 TR_{312}	—	December 16, 2007	Mount Lemmon	Mount Lemmon Survey	·	3.2 km	MPC · JPL
437040	2012 TN_{313}	—	October 7, 2008	Mount Lemmon	Mount Lemmon Survey	·	1.3 km	MPC · JPL
437041	2012 TT_{316}	—	December 3, 2008	Mount Lemmon	Mount Lemmon Survey	·	2.7 km	MPC · JPL
437042	2012 TD_{317}	—	March 13, 2005	Mount Lemmon	Mount Lemmon Survey	ADE	2.2 km	MPC · JPL
437043	2012 TY_{317}	—	November 9, 2001	Socorro	LINEAR	·	3.9 km	MPC · JPL
437044	2012 TF_{320}	—	July 6, 2003	Kitt Peak	Spacewatch	·	1.8 km	MPC · JPL
437045	2012 UV	—	September 18, 2012	Kitt Peak	Spacewatch	·	2.5 km	MPC · JPL
437046	2012 UV_{6}	—	December 31, 2008	Kitt Peak	Spacewatch	·	2.1 km	MPC · JPL
437047	2012 UJ_{9}	—	December 18, 2001	Socorro	LINEAR	·	1.4 km	MPC · JPL
437048	2012 UC_{27}	—	October 29, 2003	Kitt Peak	Spacewatch	·	1.9 km	MPC · JPL
437049	2012 UK_{28}	—	April 4, 2010	XuYi	PMO NEO Survey Program	·	3.7 km	MPC · JPL
437050	2012 UN_{32}	—	October 15, 2007	Kitt Peak	Spacewatch	HOF	2.9 km	MPC · JPL
437051	2012 UA_{35}	—	October 25, 2008	Mount Lemmon	Mount Lemmon Survey	·	1.4 km	MPC · JPL
437052	2012 US_{35}	—	November 18, 1995	Kitt Peak	Spacewatch	·	1.9 km	MPC · JPL
437053	2012 UT_{35}	—	October 8, 2012	Mount Lemmon	Mount Lemmon Survey	·	1.3 km	MPC · JPL
437054	2012 UQ_{36}	—	October 16, 2012	Kitt Peak	Spacewatch	·	2.6 km	MPC · JPL
437055	2012 UA_{39}	—	August 3, 2010	WISE	WISE	·	3.1 km	MPC · JPL
437056	2012 UY_{39}	—	November 18, 2007	Kitt Peak	Spacewatch	·	1.7 km	MPC · JPL
437057	2012 UF_{40}	—	December 30, 2005	Kitt Peak	Spacewatch	·	1.3 km	MPC · JPL
437058	2012 UH_{40}	—	December 29, 2008	Kitt Peak	Spacewatch	·	1.9 km	MPC · JPL
437059	2012 US_{40}	—	October 28, 2008	Kitt Peak	Spacewatch	·	1.6 km	MPC · JPL
437060	2012 UV_{40}	—	April 2, 2006	Kitt Peak	Spacewatch	·	1.7 km	MPC · JPL
437061	2012 UQ_{42}	—	September 19, 2003	Kitt Peak	Spacewatch	·	1.9 km	MPC · JPL
437062	2012 UZ_{45}	—	March 18, 2010	Kitt Peak	Spacewatch	·	1.8 km	MPC · JPL
437063	2012 UP_{46}	—	April 28, 2003	Kitt Peak	Spacewatch	EUN	820 m	MPC · JPL
437064	2012 UC_{47}	—	November 19, 2008	Mount Lemmon	Mount Lemmon Survey	·	1.7 km	MPC · JPL
437065	2012 UB_{48}	—	March 15, 2010	Mount Lemmon	Mount Lemmon Survey	·	1.9 km	MPC · JPL
437066	2012 UQ_{49}	—	August 10, 2007	Kitt Peak	Spacewatch	·	1.7 km	MPC · JPL
437067	2012 UJ_{50}	—	October 13, 2001	Kitt Peak	Spacewatch	·	3.0 km	MPC · JPL
437068	2012 UE_{52}	—	October 7, 2007	Mount Lemmon	Mount Lemmon Survey	·	1.9 km	MPC · JPL
437069	2012 UK_{54}	—	October 9, 2012	Kitt Peak	Spacewatch	·	1.8 km	MPC · JPL
437070	2012 UT_{55}	—	December 4, 2008	Mount Lemmon	Mount Lemmon Survey	·	2.5 km	MPC · JPL
437071	2012 UU_{55}	—	June 3, 2008	Mount Lemmon	Mount Lemmon Survey	·	970 m	MPC · JPL
437072	2012 UZ_{56}	—	November 7, 2007	Kitt Peak	Spacewatch	·	2.5 km	MPC · JPL
437073	2012 UK_{59}	—	June 16, 2006	Kitt Peak	Spacewatch	·	2.9 km	MPC · JPL
437074	2012 UG_{60}	—	August 7, 2008	Kitt Peak	Spacewatch	PHO	1.1 km	MPC · JPL
437075	2012 UM_{63}	—	December 4, 2008	Mount Lemmon	Mount Lemmon Survey	·	1.8 km	MPC · JPL
437076	2012 US_{65}	—	October 20, 2012	Kitt Peak	Spacewatch	·	2.8 km	MPC · JPL
437077	2012 UT_{66}	—	October 28, 2008	Kitt Peak	Spacewatch	·	1.2 km	MPC · JPL
437078	2012 UL_{67}	—	November 19, 2007	Kitt Peak	Spacewatch	·	2.7 km	MPC · JPL
437079	2012 UK_{69}	—	March 13, 2011	Mount Lemmon	Mount Lemmon Survey	·	1.7 km	MPC · JPL
437080	2012 UO_{69}	—	September 30, 2006	Kitt Peak	Spacewatch	·	2.6 km	MPC · JPL
437081	2012 UH_{71}	—	November 1, 2007	Mount Lemmon	Mount Lemmon Survey	·	1.4 km	MPC · JPL
437082	2012 UU_{71}	—	November 2, 2008	Mount Lemmon	Mount Lemmon Survey	·	1.4 km	MPC · JPL
437083	2012 UZ_{71}	—	October 28, 2008	Kitt Peak	Spacewatch	·	1.1 km	MPC · JPL
437084	2012 UQ_{75}	—	April 18, 2007	Mount Lemmon	Mount Lemmon Survey	·	940 m	MPC · JPL
437085	2012 UY_{75}	—	April 2, 2006	Kitt Peak	Spacewatch	·	1.9 km	MPC · JPL
437086	2012 US_{76}	—	May 22, 2011	Mount Lemmon	Mount Lemmon Survey	·	1.3 km	MPC · JPL
437087	2012 UL_{77}	—	September 12, 2007	Catalina	CSS	·	2.0 km	MPC · JPL
437088	2012 US_{77}	—	March 27, 2011	Mount Lemmon	Mount Lemmon Survey	·	1.2 km	MPC · JPL
437089	2012 UA_{78}	—	October 6, 2012	Mount Lemmon	Mount Lemmon Survey	PAD	1.6 km	MPC · JPL
437090	2012 UM_{78}	—	November 19, 2007	Kitt Peak	Spacewatch	EOS	2.1 km	MPC · JPL
437091	2012 UK_{83}	—	October 27, 2003	Kitt Peak	Spacewatch	·	2.0 km	MPC · JPL
437092	2012 UU_{83}	—	May 30, 2006	Kitt Peak	Spacewatch	·	2.1 km	MPC · JPL
437093	2012 US_{84}	—	September 30, 2005	Mount Lemmon	Mount Lemmon Survey	·	990 m	MPC · JPL
437094	2012 UU_{86}	—	June 2, 2010	WISE	WISE	·	2.2 km	MPC · JPL
437095	2012 UJ_{88}	—	September 20, 2006	Kitt Peak	Spacewatch	·	2.4 km	MPC · JPL
437096	2012 UZ_{88}	—	February 16, 2010	WISE	WISE	·	5.9 km	MPC · JPL
437097	2012 UR_{91}	—	February 20, 2009	Kitt Peak	Spacewatch	·	2.4 km	MPC · JPL
437098	2012 UE_{97}	—	September 21, 2012	Kitt Peak	Spacewatch	·	2.0 km	MPC · JPL
437099	2012 UB_{99}	—	October 20, 2003	Kitt Peak	Spacewatch	·	1.9 km	MPC · JPL
437100	2012 US_{101}	—	November 3, 2007	Kitt Peak	Spacewatch	·	2.4 km	MPC · JPL

== 437101–437200 ==
back to top

Designation			Discovery			Properties		Ref
Permanent	Provisional	Named after	Date	Site	Discoverer(s)	Category	Diam.	Ref
437101	2012 UO_{103}	—	October 8, 2007	Kitt Peak	Spacewatch	KOR	1.3 km	MPC · JPL
437102	2012 UK_{106}	—	September 17, 2006	Kitt Peak	Spacewatch	·	2.3 km	MPC · JPL
437103	2012 UJ_{109}	—	March 26, 2006	Kitt Peak	Spacewatch	·	1.6 km	MPC · JPL
437104	2012 UD_{110}	—	December 22, 2008	Mount Lemmon	Mount Lemmon Survey	·	1.7 km	MPC · JPL
437105	2012 UE_{110}	—	November 7, 2008	Mount Lemmon	Mount Lemmon Survey	·	1.7 km	MPC · JPL
437106	2012 UW_{110}	—	October 27, 1994	Kitt Peak	Spacewatch	·	2.5 km	MPC · JPL
437107	2012 UD_{113}	—	October 4, 2007	Kitt Peak	Spacewatch	KOR	1.2 km	MPC · JPL
437108	2012 UH_{113}	—	October 8, 2012	Kitt Peak	Spacewatch	·	3.4 km	MPC · JPL
437109	2012 UB_{116}	—	January 31, 2009	Mount Lemmon	Mount Lemmon Survey	·	2.3 km	MPC · JPL
437110	2012 UX_{117}	—	December 22, 2008	Kitt Peak	Spacewatch	·	1.7 km	MPC · JPL
437111	2012 UK_{119}	—	October 9, 2012	Mount Lemmon	Mount Lemmon Survey	·	2.9 km	MPC · JPL
437112	2012 UP_{125}	—	March 16, 2009	Mount Lemmon	Mount Lemmon Survey	EOS	2.3 km	MPC · JPL
437113	2012 UN_{126}	—	December 15, 2001	Socorro	LINEAR	·	3.1 km	MPC · JPL
437114	2012 UE_{127}	—	December 4, 2008	Kitt Peak	Spacewatch	(5)	1.0 km	MPC · JPL
437115	2012 UH_{131}	—	November 15, 2003	Kitt Peak	Spacewatch	·	2.2 km	MPC · JPL
437116	2012 UP_{132}	—	March 18, 2010	Mount Lemmon	Mount Lemmon Survey	HOF	2.9 km	MPC · JPL
437117	2012 UQ_{133}	—	October 10, 2008	Mount Lemmon	Mount Lemmon Survey	(5)	1.2 km	MPC · JPL
437118	2012 UD_{134}	—	July 28, 2011	Haleakala	Pan-STARRS 1	·	3.5 km	MPC · JPL
437119	2012 UT_{135}	—	November 22, 2008	Kitt Peak	Spacewatch	·	2.7 km	MPC · JPL
437120	2012 UW_{135}	—	November 15, 2007	Catalina	CSS	·	2.4 km	MPC · JPL
437121	2012 UL_{137}	—	October 13, 1999	Kitt Peak	Spacewatch	·	1.1 km	MPC · JPL
437122	2012 UN_{137}	—	October 6, 1996	Kitt Peak	Spacewatch	·	1.9 km	MPC · JPL
437123	2012 US_{139}	—	January 20, 2009	Kitt Peak	Spacewatch	·	3.2 km	MPC · JPL
437124	2012 UL_{142}	—	October 15, 2012	Mount Lemmon	Mount Lemmon Survey	·	2.3 km	MPC · JPL
437125	2012 UV_{145}	—	December 31, 2008	Mount Lemmon	Mount Lemmon Survey	·	1.3 km	MPC · JPL
437126	2012 UA_{148}	—	May 9, 2011	Kitt Peak	Spacewatch	·	1.1 km	MPC · JPL
437127	2012 UL_{149}	—	September 22, 1995	Kitt Peak	Spacewatch	HYG	2.5 km	MPC · JPL
437128	2012 UT_{149}	—	March 11, 2005	Mount Lemmon	Mount Lemmon Survey	·	1.8 km	MPC · JPL
437129	2012 UF_{150}	—	November 9, 2007	Kitt Peak	Spacewatch	·	1.7 km	MPC · JPL
437130	2012 UU_{153}	—	December 30, 2008	Kitt Peak	Spacewatch	·	1.9 km	MPC · JPL
437131	2012 UR_{157}	—	September 7, 2004	Socorro	LINEAR	·	1.2 km	MPC · JPL
437132	2012 UL_{160}	—	September 9, 2008	Mount Lemmon	Mount Lemmon Survey	·	1.2 km	MPC · JPL
437133	2012 UE_{165}	—	July 24, 1979	Palomar	S. J. Bus	·	1.2 km	MPC · JPL
437134	2012 UX_{165}	—	September 13, 2007	Kitt Peak	Spacewatch	AGN	1.5 km	MPC · JPL
437135	2012 UP_{166}	—	February 22, 1998	Kitt Peak	Spacewatch	·	1.1 km	MPC · JPL
437136	2012 UJ_{168}	—	November 9, 2008	Mount Lemmon	Mount Lemmon Survey	·	1.7 km	MPC · JPL
437137	2012 UG_{169}	—	September 7, 1999	Socorro	LINEAR	ADE	1.7 km	MPC · JPL
437138	2012 VN_{3}	—	September 12, 2007	Mount Lemmon	Mount Lemmon Survey	KOR	1.3 km	MPC · JPL
437139	2012 VV_{7}	—	September 10, 2007	Kitt Peak	Spacewatch	·	1.8 km	MPC · JPL
437140	2012 VA_{8}	—	October 22, 2003	Kitt Peak	Spacewatch	·	1.9 km	MPC · JPL
437141	2012 VK_{10}	—	September 11, 2007	Mount Lemmon	Mount Lemmon Survey	AGN	1.0 km	MPC · JPL
437142	2012 VM_{10}	—	May 20, 2010	Mount Lemmon	Mount Lemmon Survey	EOS	2.2 km	MPC · JPL
437143	2012 VH_{12}	—	September 20, 2007	Kitt Peak	Spacewatch	·	1.7 km	MPC · JPL
437144	2012 VG_{13}	—	October 23, 2008	Mount Lemmon	Mount Lemmon Survey	·	1.0 km	MPC · JPL
437145	2012 VZ_{15}	—	December 5, 2007	Mount Lemmon	Mount Lemmon Survey	EOS	2.2 km	MPC · JPL
437146	2012 VS_{17}	—	October 2, 2006	Mount Lemmon	Mount Lemmon Survey	EOS	1.7 km	MPC · JPL
437147	2012 VC_{18}	—	May 7, 2006	Mount Lemmon	Mount Lemmon Survey	·	2.3 km	MPC · JPL
437148	2012 VN_{21}	—	April 23, 2004	Desert Eagle	W. K. Y. Yeung	·	2.7 km	MPC · JPL
437149	2012 VC_{24}	—	October 31, 2008	Kitt Peak	Spacewatch	·	1.1 km	MPC · JPL
437150	2012 VE_{29}	—	October 3, 2006	Mount Lemmon	Mount Lemmon Survey	HYG	2.8 km	MPC · JPL
437151	2012 VG_{30}	—	October 19, 2003	Kitt Peak	Spacewatch	·	1.6 km	MPC · JPL
437152	2012 VG_{31}	—	April 2, 2009	Mount Lemmon	Mount Lemmon Survey	URS	2.7 km	MPC · JPL
437153	2012 VX_{34}	—	November 7, 2012	Kitt Peak	Spacewatch	EUN	1.6 km	MPC · JPL
437154	2012 VN_{35}	—	October 8, 2012	Mount Lemmon	Mount Lemmon Survey	·	2.0 km	MPC · JPL
437155	2012 VC_{36}	—	October 10, 2007	Kitt Peak	Spacewatch	·	3.6 km	MPC · JPL
437156	2012 VG_{36}	—	November 14, 2007	Mount Lemmon	Mount Lemmon Survey	·	3.1 km	MPC · JPL
437157	2012 VN_{36}	—	November 14, 2007	Kitt Peak	Spacewatch	TEL	1.8 km	MPC · JPL
437158	2012 VV_{37}	—	April 26, 2011	Kitt Peak	Spacewatch	·	1.1 km	MPC · JPL
437159	2012 VO_{39}	—	January 31, 2006	Kitt Peak	Spacewatch	·	1.1 km	MPC · JPL
437160	2012 VZ_{39}	—	October 11, 2001	Palomar	NEAT	EOS	2.7 km	MPC · JPL
437161	2012 VB_{40}	—	October 16, 2007	Mount Lemmon	Mount Lemmon Survey	·	2.2 km	MPC · JPL
437162	2012 VJ_{41}	—	April 22, 2004	Kitt Peak	Spacewatch	·	2.7 km	MPC · JPL
437163	2012 VC_{46}	—	September 14, 2007	Catalina	CSS	·	1.9 km	MPC · JPL
437164	2012 VX_{46}	—	October 29, 2008	Mount Lemmon	Mount Lemmon Survey	·	1.2 km	MPC · JPL
437165	2012 VO_{47}	—	September 12, 2007	Mount Lemmon	Mount Lemmon Survey	KOR	1.1 km	MPC · JPL
437166	2012 VA_{49}	—	September 23, 1998	Kitt Peak	Spacewatch	·	1.6 km	MPC · JPL
437167	2012 VW_{49}	—	October 15, 2007	Mount Lemmon	Mount Lemmon Survey	NAE	2.0 km	MPC · JPL
437168	2012 VX_{49}	—	May 8, 2005	Kitt Peak	Spacewatch	·	1.8 km	MPC · JPL
437169	2012 VD_{53}	—	November 19, 2008	Mount Lemmon	Mount Lemmon Survey	·	1.2 km	MPC · JPL
437170	2012 VT_{58}	—	January 1, 2009	Kitt Peak	Spacewatch	·	1.5 km	MPC · JPL
437171	2012 VY_{60}	—	October 10, 2007	Mount Lemmon	Mount Lemmon Survey	·	1.9 km	MPC · JPL
437172	2012 VA_{63}	—	November 1, 2008	Mount Lemmon	Mount Lemmon Survey	(5)	850 m	MPC · JPL
437173	2012 VL_{65}	—	October 8, 2012	Kitt Peak	Spacewatch	·	3.1 km	MPC · JPL
437174	2012 VK_{66}	—	October 30, 2007	Mount Lemmon	Mount Lemmon Survey	KOR	1.2 km	MPC · JPL
437175	2012 VE_{67}	—	October 27, 2003	Kitt Peak	Spacewatch	·	1.7 km	MPC · JPL
437176	2012 VD_{71}	—	December 29, 2008	Mount Lemmon	Mount Lemmon Survey	HOF	2.5 km	MPC · JPL
437177	2012 VK_{71}	—	November 19, 2003	Kitt Peak	Spacewatch	MRX	1.0 km	MPC · JPL
437178	2012 VR_{71}	—	November 15, 2003	Kitt Peak	Spacewatch	·	2.1 km	MPC · JPL
437179	2012 VV_{71}	—	October 22, 2003	Kitt Peak	Spacewatch	(12739)	1.6 km	MPC · JPL
437180	2012 VN_{74}	—	March 18, 2010	Kitt Peak	Spacewatch	·	1.7 km	MPC · JPL
437181	2012 VS_{79}	—	January 16, 2005	Kitt Peak	Spacewatch	·	1.5 km	MPC · JPL
437182	2012 VO_{81}	—	October 31, 1999	Kitt Peak	Spacewatch	EUN	990 m	MPC · JPL
437183	2012 VG_{83}	—	October 21, 2012	Kitt Peak	Spacewatch	VER	2.9 km	MPC · JPL
437184	2012 VE_{91}	—	February 23, 2010	WISE	WISE	·	4.7 km	MPC · JPL
437185	2012 VU_{92}	—	November 4, 2007	Kitt Peak	Spacewatch	·	2.5 km	MPC · JPL
437186	2012 VY_{94}	—	August 21, 2006	Kitt Peak	Spacewatch	·	2.5 km	MPC · JPL
437187	2012 VX_{97}	—	August 21, 2007	Anderson Mesa	LONEOS	·	2.4 km	MPC · JPL
437188	2012 VJ_{99}	—	November 19, 2008	Mount Lemmon	Mount Lemmon Survey	·	1.8 km	MPC · JPL
437189	2012 VB_{100}	—	July 26, 1995	Kitt Peak	Spacewatch	·	3.4 km	MPC · JPL
437190	2012 VQ_{101}	—	March 16, 2007	Mount Lemmon	Mount Lemmon Survey	·	1.3 km	MPC · JPL
437191	2012 VO_{102}	—	November 2, 2007	Mount Lemmon	Mount Lemmon Survey	·	1.9 km	MPC · JPL
437192 Frederikolsen	2012 VN_{106}	Frederikolsen	August 27, 2011	Zelenchukskaya Stn110639	T. V. Krjačko	·	3.7 km	MPC · JPL
437193	2012 VX_{106}	—	October 14, 2012	Kitt Peak	Spacewatch	·	2.8 km	MPC · JPL
437194	2012 VJ_{111}	—	December 31, 2008	Mount Lemmon	Mount Lemmon Survey	·	2.1 km	MPC · JPL
437195	2012 WV	—	October 21, 2012	Kitt Peak	Spacewatch	·	2.8 km	MPC · JPL
437196	2012 WK_{1}	—	October 21, 2008	Kitt Peak	Spacewatch	MAR	710 m	MPC · JPL
437197	2012 WX_{1}	—	September 19, 2007	Kitt Peak	Spacewatch	·	1.6 km	MPC · JPL
437198	2012 WB_{3}	—	September 14, 2006	Kitt Peak	Spacewatch	VER	2.5 km	MPC · JPL
437199	2012 WP_{4}	—	December 15, 2004	Socorro	LINEAR	·	1.2 km	MPC · JPL
437200	2012 WY_{5}	—	November 14, 2007	Kitt Peak	Spacewatch	·	2.2 km	MPC · JPL

== 437201–437300 ==
back to top

Designation			Discovery			Properties		Ref
Permanent	Provisional	Named after	Date	Site	Discoverer(s)	Category	Diam.	Ref
437201	2012 WZ_{5}	—	November 17, 2001	Kitt Peak	Spacewatch	EOS	2.3 km	MPC · JPL
437202	2012 WC_{8}	—	September 17, 2006	Kitt Peak	Spacewatch	·	2.3 km	MPC · JPL
437203	2012 WT_{8}	—	May 9, 2004	Kitt Peak	Spacewatch	·	2.8 km	MPC · JPL
437204	2012 WY_{9}	—	October 2, 2006	Mount Lemmon	Mount Lemmon Survey	VER	2.6 km	MPC · JPL
437205	2012 WB_{10}	—	January 7, 2009	Kitt Peak	Spacewatch	·	1.8 km	MPC · JPL
437206	2012 WY_{10}	—	January 16, 2009	Mount Lemmon	Mount Lemmon Survey	KOR	1.4 km	MPC · JPL
437207	2012 WA_{11}	—	September 15, 2007	Kitt Peak	Spacewatch	·	1.5 km	MPC · JPL
437208	2012 WD_{11}	—	October 28, 2008	Kitt Peak	Spacewatch	·	1.2 km	MPC · JPL
437209	2012 WH_{11}	—	November 2, 2007	Kitt Peak	Spacewatch	·	2.0 km	MPC · JPL
437210	2012 WB_{12}	—	May 10, 2010	WISE	WISE	·	3.6 km	MPC · JPL
437211	2012 WF_{13}	—	April 26, 2006	Mount Lemmon	Mount Lemmon Survey	·	2.6 km	MPC · JPL
437212	2012 WS_{13}	—	March 19, 2010	Mount Lemmon	Mount Lemmon Survey	·	1.9 km	MPC · JPL
437213	2012 WB_{15}	—	December 9, 2004	Kitt Peak	Spacewatch	(5)	1.2 km	MPC · JPL
437214	2012 WE_{17}	—	November 18, 2008	Catalina	CSS	·	1.2 km	MPC · JPL
437215	2012 WV_{17}	—	October 21, 2006	Kitt Peak	Spacewatch	·	2.8 km	MPC · JPL
437216	2012 WS_{19}	—	December 4, 2007	Kitt Peak	Spacewatch	·	2.9 km	MPC · JPL
437217	2012 WZ_{22}	—	December 22, 2008	Kitt Peak	Spacewatch	·	1.5 km	MPC · JPL
437218	2012 WJ_{23}	—	November 7, 2012	Mount Lemmon	Mount Lemmon Survey	·	2.0 km	MPC · JPL
437219	2012 WP_{23}	—	December 2, 2008	Kitt Peak	Spacewatch	·	2.5 km	MPC · JPL
437220	2012 WX_{24}	—	August 27, 2006	Anderson Mesa	LONEOS	·	2.3 km	MPC · JPL
437221	2012 WF_{25}	—	April 17, 2009	Mount Lemmon	Mount Lemmon Survey	·	3.7 km	MPC · JPL
437222	2012 WM_{30}	—	February 17, 2010	Kitt Peak	Spacewatch	·	4.0 km	MPC · JPL
437223	2012 WO_{35}	—	November 13, 2007	Mount Lemmon	Mount Lemmon Survey	·	3.2 km	MPC · JPL
437224	2012 XW_{1}	—	October 14, 1995	Xinglong	SCAP	(5)	1.7 km	MPC · JPL
437225	2012 XT_{3}	—	December 1, 2008	Kitt Peak	Spacewatch	·	1.5 km	MPC · JPL
437226	2012 XJ_{4}	—	April 28, 2003	Kitt Peak	Spacewatch	·	1.7 km	MPC · JPL
437227	2012 XG_{5}	—	September 14, 2007	Kitt Peak	Spacewatch	·	1.7 km	MPC · JPL
437228	2012 XM_{5}	—	October 4, 2006	Mount Lemmon	Mount Lemmon Survey	·	2.9 km	MPC · JPL
437229	2012 XQ_{5}	—	September 22, 2001	Kitt Peak	Spacewatch	·	3.2 km	MPC · JPL
437230	2012 XV_{5}	—	January 11, 2008	Mount Lemmon	Mount Lemmon Survey	·	2.8 km	MPC · JPL
437231	2012 XX_{5}	—	November 4, 2007	Mount Lemmon	Mount Lemmon Survey	·	1.8 km	MPC · JPL
437232	2012 XX_{7}	—	November 2, 2007	Mount Lemmon	Mount Lemmon Survey	·	3.6 km	MPC · JPL
437233	2012 XL_{12}	—	May 23, 2011	Mount Lemmon	Mount Lemmon Survey	(5)	1.6 km	MPC · JPL
437234	2012 XM_{17}	—	October 22, 2012	Kitt Peak	Spacewatch	EOS	2.0 km	MPC · JPL
437235	2012 XB_{20}	—	October 11, 2007	Kitt Peak	Spacewatch	GEF	1.4 km	MPC · JPL
437236	2012 XO_{20}	—	December 19, 2007	Mount Lemmon	Mount Lemmon Survey	·	3.6 km	MPC · JPL
437237	2012 XG_{21}	—	November 30, 2003	Kitt Peak	Spacewatch	·	1.5 km	MPC · JPL
437238	2012 XV_{21}	—	December 14, 2003	Kitt Peak	Spacewatch	·	1.6 km	MPC · JPL
437239	2012 XB_{22}	—	December 16, 2007	Kitt Peak	Spacewatch	·	3.0 km	MPC · JPL
437240	2012 XM_{23}	—	November 18, 2003	Kitt Peak	Spacewatch	·	1.6 km	MPC · JPL
437241	2012 XH_{24}	—	August 8, 2007	Siding Spring	SSS	·	1.8 km	MPC · JPL
437242	2012 XZ_{25}	—	November 20, 2001	Socorro	LINEAR	·	1.3 km	MPC · JPL
437243	2012 XG_{27}	—	November 16, 2006	Mount Lemmon	Mount Lemmon Survey	·	3.0 km	MPC · JPL
437244	2012 XG_{28}	—	October 17, 2007	Mount Lemmon	Mount Lemmon Survey	KOR	1.4 km	MPC · JPL
437245	2012 XC_{29}	—	August 3, 2010	WISE	WISE	EMA	3.3 km	MPC · JPL
437246	2012 XX_{38}	—	May 8, 2005	Kitt Peak	Spacewatch	KOR	1.5 km	MPC · JPL
437247	2012 XN_{49}	—	November 17, 1995	Kitt Peak	Spacewatch	·	3.5 km	MPC · JPL
437248	2012 XA_{50}	—	February 14, 2010	Kitt Peak	Spacewatch	·	1.6 km	MPC · JPL
437249	2012 XV_{51}	—	July 22, 2007	Siding Spring	SSS	·	2.3 km	MPC · JPL
437250	2012 XW_{59}	—	July 1, 2011	Kitt Peak	Spacewatch	AGN	1.2 km	MPC · JPL
437251	2012 XU_{65}	—	April 21, 2009	Mount Lemmon	Mount Lemmon Survey	URS	3.5 km	MPC · JPL
437252	2012 XZ_{70}	—	April 19, 1998	Kitt Peak	Spacewatch	EUN	1.6 km	MPC · JPL
437253	2012 XF_{80}	—	September 28, 2006	Mount Lemmon	Mount Lemmon Survey	·	1.7 km	MPC · JPL
437254	2012 XS_{85}	—	January 17, 2005	Socorro	LINEAR	EUN	1.6 km	MPC · JPL
437255	2012 XV_{93}	—	November 26, 2003	Kitt Peak	Spacewatch	AGN	1.1 km	MPC · JPL
437256	2012 XZ_{93}	—	December 9, 2004	Kitt Peak	Spacewatch	EUN	1.5 km	MPC · JPL
437257	2012 XA_{96}	—	November 26, 2012	Mount Lemmon	Mount Lemmon Survey	·	2.9 km	MPC · JPL
437258	2012 XK_{96}	—	November 7, 2007	Kitt Peak	Spacewatch	EOS	1.8 km	MPC · JPL
437259	2012 XC_{105}	—	October 17, 1995	Kitt Peak	Spacewatch	·	1.3 km	MPC · JPL
437260	2012 XB_{108}	—	December 18, 2001	Socorro	LINEAR	·	3.1 km	MPC · JPL
437261	2012 XE_{110}	—	December 16, 2004	Catalina	CSS	·	1.8 km	MPC · JPL
437262	2012 XD_{115}	—	November 2, 2007	Kitt Peak	Spacewatch	·	2.0 km	MPC · JPL
437263	2012 XC_{117}	—	November 5, 2012	Kitt Peak	Spacewatch	·	3.6 km	MPC · JPL
437264	2012 XJ_{122}	—	December 20, 2001	Kitt Peak	Spacewatch	·	3.6 km	MPC · JPL
437265	2012 XG_{123}	—	January 15, 2008	Kitt Peak	Spacewatch	·	2.3 km	MPC · JPL
437266	2012 XG_{126}	—	November 21, 2008	Kitt Peak	Spacewatch	(5)	1.2 km	MPC · JPL
437267	2012 XK_{126}	—	May 12, 2010	Mount Lemmon	Mount Lemmon Survey	·	2.3 km	MPC · JPL
437268	2012 XW_{128}	—	October 11, 2007	Mount Lemmon	Mount Lemmon Survey	MRX	1.3 km	MPC · JPL
437269	2012 XC_{137}	—	November 14, 2007	Mount Lemmon	Mount Lemmon Survey	·	2.7 km	MPC · JPL
437270	2012 XM_{139}	—	September 25, 2012	Mount Lemmon	Mount Lemmon Survey	·	1.7 km	MPC · JPL
437271	2012 XV_{140}	—	May 4, 2005	Kitt Peak	Spacewatch	·	2.5 km	MPC · JPL
437272	2012 XJ_{144}	—	September 28, 2006	Catalina	CSS	·	3.5 km	MPC · JPL
437273	2012 XP_{147}	—	June 11, 2010	Mount Lemmon	Mount Lemmon Survey	·	3.1 km	MPC · JPL
437274	2012 XE_{148}	—	November 8, 2007	Mount Lemmon	Mount Lemmon Survey	·	3.3 km	MPC · JPL
437275	2012 XL_{150}	—	December 15, 2001	Socorro	LINEAR	·	3.4 km	MPC · JPL
437276	2012 XZ_{154}	—	September 19, 2006	Catalina	CSS	·	3.3 km	MPC · JPL
437277	2012 XS_{155}	—	June 2, 2011	Mount Lemmon	Mount Lemmon Survey	·	2.6 km	MPC · JPL
437278	2013 AW_{1}	—	October 21, 2006	Mount Lemmon	Mount Lemmon Survey	·	3.8 km	MPC · JPL
437279	2013 AB_{6}	—	June 11, 2010	Mount Lemmon	Mount Lemmon Survey	·	2.4 km	MPC · JPL
437280	2013 AV_{14}	—	November 26, 2009	Mount Lemmon	Mount Lemmon Survey	L4	10 km	MPC · JPL
437281	2013 AF_{25}	—	November 18, 2007	Mount Lemmon	Mount Lemmon Survey	·	2.0 km	MPC · JPL
437282	2013 AU_{94}	—	June 8, 2007	Kitt Peak	Spacewatch	·	1.4 km	MPC · JPL
437283	2013 AT_{96}	—	November 2, 2010	Mount Lemmon	Mount Lemmon Survey	L4	7.8 km	MPC · JPL
437284	2013 AG_{103}	—	January 10, 2008	Mount Lemmon	Mount Lemmon Survey	·	2.5 km	MPC · JPL
437285	2013 AU_{131}	—	September 19, 2011	Mount Lemmon	Mount Lemmon Survey	L4	10 km	MPC · JPL
437286	2013 AP_{132}	—	January 3, 2013	Mount Lemmon	Mount Lemmon Survey	L4	9.3 km	MPC · JPL
437287	2013 AY_{132}	—	October 10, 2010	Mount Lemmon	Mount Lemmon Survey	L4	9.1 km	MPC · JPL
437288	2013 AN_{133}	—	September 24, 2009	Mount Lemmon	Mount Lemmon Survey	L4	7.4 km	MPC · JPL
437289	2013 AX_{140}	—	March 17, 2004	Kitt Peak	Spacewatch	·	2.1 km	MPC · JPL
437290	2013 BH_{1}	—	November 6, 2010	Mount Lemmon	Mount Lemmon Survey	L4	7.8 km	MPC · JPL
437291	2013 BP_{2}	—	July 29, 2010	WISE	WISE	L4	9.1 km	MPC · JPL
437292	2013 BG_{17}	—	January 16, 2013	Mount Lemmon	Mount Lemmon Survey	L4	8.6 km	MPC · JPL
437293	2013 BS_{21}	—	September 23, 2011	Catalina	CSS	·	3.4 km	MPC · JPL
437294	2013 BK_{31}	—	November 3, 2010	Mount Lemmon	Mount Lemmon Survey	L4	6.8 km	MPC · JPL
437295	2013 BJ_{37}	—	December 7, 2012	Mount Lemmon	Mount Lemmon Survey	L4	7.8 km	MPC · JPL
437296	2013 BK_{40}	—	January 5, 2013	Kitt Peak	Spacewatch	L4	8.7 km	MPC · JPL
437297	2013 BS_{54}	—	November 13, 2006	Catalina	CSS	·	2.7 km	MPC · JPL
437298	2013 BR_{64}	—	October 28, 2010	Mount Lemmon	Mount Lemmon Survey	L4	7.3 km	MPC · JPL
437299	2013 BY_{67}	—	October 18, 2011	Catalina	CSS	·	3.5 km	MPC · JPL
437300	2013 BR_{71}	—	January 10, 2013	Kitt Peak	Spacewatch	L4	7.8 km	MPC · JPL

== 437301–437400 ==
back to top

Designation			Discovery			Properties		Ref
Permanent	Provisional	Named after	Date	Site	Discoverer(s)	Category	Diam.	Ref
437301	2013 CW_{10}	—	October 13, 2007	Mount Lemmon	Mount Lemmon Survey	L4	10 km	MPC · JPL
437302	2013 CK_{13}	—	November 25, 2010	Mount Lemmon	Mount Lemmon Survey	L4	6.4 km	MPC · JPL
437303	2013 CJ_{15}	—	May 29, 2010	WISE	WISE	CYB	3.4 km	MPC · JPL
437304	2013 CK_{34}	—	January 18, 2013	Mount Lemmon	Mount Lemmon Survey	L4	7.9 km	MPC · JPL
437305	2013 CX_{39}	—	November 14, 2010	Mount Lemmon	Mount Lemmon Survey	L4	7.0 km	MPC · JPL
437306	2013 CG_{85}	—	August 26, 2000	Socorro	LINEAR	·	3.1 km	MPC · JPL
437307	2013 CG_{104}	—	November 14, 2010	Mount Lemmon	Mount Lemmon Survey	L4	7.1 km	MPC · JPL
437308	2013 CF_{133}	—	January 10, 2013	Kitt Peak	Spacewatch	L4	6.9 km	MPC · JPL
437309	2013 CY_{199}	—	December 3, 2010	Mount Lemmon	Mount Lemmon Survey	L4	8.3 km	MPC · JPL
437310	2013 CN_{206}	—	September 27, 2009	Kitt Peak	Spacewatch	L4	6.6 km	MPC · JPL
437311	2013 CF_{217}	—	September 28, 2008	Mount Lemmon	Mount Lemmon Survey	L4 · ERY	7.5 km	MPC · JPL
437312	2013 DR_{14}	—	May 9, 2004	Kitt Peak	Spacewatch	L4	8.3 km	MPC · JPL
437313	2013 EK_{73}	—	February 24, 2012	Mount Lemmon	Mount Lemmon Survey	T_{j} (2.93) · centaur · critical	10 km	MPC · JPL
437314	2013 JA_{15}	—	November 17, 2009	Mount Lemmon	Mount Lemmon Survey	L4	8.3 km	MPC · JPL
437315	2013 NQ_{22}	—	April 23, 2007	Kitt Peak	Spacewatch	·	1.9 km	MPC · JPL
437316	2013 OS_{3}	—	July 16, 2013	Haleakala	Pan-STARRS 1	APO	720 m	MPC · JPL
437317	2013 PW_{2}	—	August 29, 2000	Socorro	LINEAR	H	620 m	MPC · JPL
437318	2013 PN_{6}	—	January 21, 2004	Socorro	LINEAR	H	470 m	MPC · JPL
437319	2013 PO_{6}	—	December 17, 2003	Kitt Peak	Spacewatch	H	470 m	MPC · JPL
437320	2013 PJ_{42}	—	December 25, 2010	Mount Lemmon	Mount Lemmon Survey	PHO	1.1 km	MPC · JPL
437321	2013 PG_{44}	—	February 17, 2010	Mount Lemmon	Mount Lemmon Survey	·	3.6 km	MPC · JPL
437322	2013 PE_{69}	—	June 10, 2013	Mount Lemmon	Mount Lemmon Survey	H	580 m	MPC · JPL
437323	2013 PF_{74}	—	October 17, 2006	Catalina	CSS	PHO	850 m	MPC · JPL
437324	2013 QP_{10}	—	November 27, 2011	Mount Lemmon	Mount Lemmon Survey	H	560 m	MPC · JPL
437325	2013 QV_{53}	—	January 18, 2012	Mount Lemmon	Mount Lemmon Survey	H	480 m	MPC · JPL
437326	2013 RD	—	February 13, 2007	Socorro	LINEAR	H	560 m	MPC · JPL
437327	2013 RK_{1}	—	October 1, 2005	Catalina	CSS	H	490 m	MPC · JPL
437328	2013 RM_{5}	—	September 1, 2005	Anderson Mesa	LONEOS	H	520 m	MPC · JPL
437329	2013 RV_{35}	—	February 26, 2011	Mount Lemmon	Mount Lemmon Survey	NYS	940 m	MPC · JPL
437330	2013 RG_{37}	—	October 23, 2006	Mount Lemmon	Mount Lemmon Survey	MAS	740 m	MPC · JPL
437331	2013 RZ_{47}	—	March 28, 2011	Mount Lemmon	Mount Lemmon Survey	AGN	1.2 km	MPC · JPL
437332	2013 RH_{53}	—	September 25, 2000	Socorro	LINEAR	·	750 m	MPC · JPL
437333	2013 RC_{57}	—	February 3, 2008	Kitt Peak	Spacewatch	·	730 m	MPC · JPL
437334	2013 RC_{94}	—	September 14, 2013	Kitt Peak	Spacewatch	THB	2.8 km	MPC · JPL
437335	2013 SH	—	October 17, 2003	Anderson Mesa	LONEOS	H	410 m	MPC · JPL
437336	2013 SY_{29}	—	October 12, 2007	Mount Lemmon	Mount Lemmon Survey	·	2.7 km	MPC · JPL
437337	2013 SR_{40}	—	March 15, 2004	Catalina	CSS	·	1.3 km	MPC · JPL
437338	2013 SK_{66}	—	September 21, 2003	Kitt Peak	Spacewatch	H	330 m	MPC · JPL
437339	2013 ST_{76}	—	April 20, 2007	Mount Lemmon	Mount Lemmon Survey	H	490 m	MPC · JPL
437340	2013 SM_{78}	—	November 19, 2006	Kitt Peak	Spacewatch	·	1.1 km	MPC · JPL
437341	2013 TX_{12}	—	September 27, 2000	Socorro	LINEAR	·	680 m	MPC · JPL
437342	2013 TU_{13}	—	December 4, 2010	Mount Lemmon	Mount Lemmon Survey	·	690 m	MPC · JPL
437343	2013 TM_{16}	—	October 31, 2006	Kitt Peak	Spacewatch	·	810 m	MPC · JPL
437344	2013 TR_{23}	—	February 15, 2010	WISE	WISE	·	1.5 km	MPC · JPL
437345	2013 TO_{24}	—	November 13, 2010	Kitt Peak	Spacewatch	·	690 m	MPC · JPL
437346	2013 TM_{39}	—	October 2, 2013	Mount Lemmon	Mount Lemmon Survey	·	2.4 km	MPC · JPL
437347	2013 TK_{41}	—	February 13, 2011	Mount Lemmon	Mount Lemmon Survey	·	1.1 km	MPC · JPL
437348	2013 TF_{51}	—	March 12, 2007	Mount Lemmon	Mount Lemmon Survey	H	560 m	MPC · JPL
437349	2013 TA_{53}	—	October 22, 2003	Kitt Peak	Spacewatch	·	1.7 km	MPC · JPL
437350	2013 TC_{59}	—	February 10, 2011	Catalina	CSS	NYS	1.2 km	MPC · JPL
437351	2013 TL_{65}	—	September 21, 2003	Kitt Peak	Spacewatch	·	650 m	MPC · JPL
437352	2013 TQ_{91}	—	November 8, 2007	Mount Lemmon	Mount Lemmon Survey	·	630 m	MPC · JPL
437353	2013 TN_{102}	—	October 4, 1997	Kitt Peak	Spacewatch	·	670 m	MPC · JPL
437354	2013 TB_{116}	—	September 20, 2006	Catalina	CSS	·	830 m	MPC · JPL
437355	2013 TL_{119}	—	January 11, 2008	Kitt Peak	Spacewatch	·	640 m	MPC · JPL
437356	2013 TS_{130}	—	June 13, 2010	WISE	WISE	·	3.7 km	MPC · JPL
437357	2013 TF_{138}	—	October 27, 2005	Mount Lemmon	Mount Lemmon Survey	·	980 m	MPC · JPL
437358	2013 TT_{142}	—	August 29, 2009	Kitt Peak	Spacewatch	·	1.1 km	MPC · JPL
437359	2013 TW_{144}	—	August 29, 2006	Catalina	CSS	·	760 m	MPC · JPL
437360	2013 TV_{158}	—	October 14, 2013	Cerro Tololo	DECam	SDO	200 km	MPC · JPL
437361	2013 UO_{2}	—	October 7, 2005	Mount Lemmon	Mount Lemmon Survey	H	500 m	MPC · JPL
437362	2013 UG_{3}	—	February 18, 2012	Catalina	CSS	H	620 m	MPC · JPL
437363	2013 UA_{4}	—	December 5, 2000	Socorro	LINEAR	PHO	1.0 km	MPC · JPL
437364	2013 UP_{4}	—	October 29, 2008	Kitt Peak	Spacewatch	H	510 m	MPC · JPL
437365	2013 UQ_{11}	—	September 27, 2000	Socorro	LINEAR	JUN	1.1 km	MPC · JPL
437366	2013 UK_{12}	—	November 20, 2000	Socorro	LINEAR	JUN	1.2 km	MPC · JPL
437367	2013 VU_{2}	—	December 22, 2005	Catalina	CSS	·	1.5 km	MPC · JPL
437368	2013 VP_{3}	—	December 20, 2003	Socorro	LINEAR	·	700 m	MPC · JPL
437369	2013 VZ_{6}	—	December 5, 2002	Socorro	LINEAR	·	2.9 km	MPC · JPL
437370	2013 VE_{7}	—	February 25, 2011	Mount Lemmon	Mount Lemmon Survey	·	1.5 km	MPC · JPL
437371	2013 VO_{9}	—	September 6, 2005	Siding Spring	SSS	H	570 m	MPC · JPL
437372	2013 VM_{15}	—	March 4, 2010	WISE	WISE	KON	2.3 km	MPC · JPL
437373	2013 VY_{17}	—	January 12, 2010	Catalina	CSS	RAF	1.1 km	MPC · JPL
437374	2013 VC_{20}	—	April 15, 2012	Catalina	CSS	·	1.5 km	MPC · JPL
437375	2013 VF_{20}	—	December 9, 1998	Kitt Peak	Spacewatch	·	1.3 km	MPC · JPL
437376	2013 WV_{1}	—	September 29, 2008	Kitt Peak	Spacewatch	·	3.5 km	MPC · JPL
437377	2013 WF_{6}	—	January 2, 2011	Mount Lemmon	Mount Lemmon Survey	·	1.0 km	MPC · JPL
437378	2013 WP_{11}	—	September 12, 2004	Socorro	LINEAR	·	2.6 km	MPC · JPL
437379	2013 WR_{18}	—	January 22, 2004	Socorro	LINEAR	·	810 m	MPC · JPL
437380	2013 WY_{21}	—	May 1, 2003	Kitt Peak	Spacewatch	·	1.3 km	MPC · JPL
437381	2013 WH_{24}	—	November 11, 2007	Mount Lemmon	Mount Lemmon Survey	·	1.4 km	MPC · JPL
437382	2013 WY_{29}	—	April 4, 2008	Kitt Peak	Spacewatch	·	660 m	MPC · JPL
437383	2013 WS_{31}	—	November 23, 2006	Kitt Peak	Spacewatch	·	700 m	MPC · JPL
437384	2013 WO_{37}	—	December 15, 2009	Mount Lemmon	Mount Lemmon Survey	·	2.3 km	MPC · JPL
437385	2013 WH_{39}	—	May 22, 2011	Mount Lemmon	Mount Lemmon Survey	EOS	2.4 km	MPC · JPL
437386	2013 WL_{40}	—	November 14, 1995	Kitt Peak	Spacewatch	·	1.1 km	MPC · JPL
437387	2013 WM_{40}	—	December 26, 2006	Kitt Peak	Spacewatch	·	1.4 km	MPC · JPL
437388	2013 WR_{41}	—	October 5, 2004	Kitt Peak	Spacewatch	·	1.3 km	MPC · JPL
437389	2013 WK_{43}	—	March 27, 2011	Mount Lemmon	Mount Lemmon Survey	·	1.3 km	MPC · JPL
437390	2013 WM_{47}	—	July 6, 2005	Kitt Peak	Spacewatch	·	1.3 km	MPC · JPL
437391	2013 WG_{48}	—	September 25, 1995	Kitt Peak	Spacewatch	JUN	1.0 km	MPC · JPL
437392	2013 WX_{54}	—	September 15, 2009	Kitt Peak	Spacewatch	·	1.2 km	MPC · JPL
437393	2013 WA_{57}	—	March 31, 2012	Mount Lemmon	Mount Lemmon Survey	H	600 m	MPC · JPL
437394	2013 WE_{57}	—	December 30, 2007	Kitt Peak	Spacewatch	·	800 m	MPC · JPL
437395	2013 WN_{62}	—	November 26, 2000	Socorro	LINEAR	ADE	3.4 km	MPC · JPL
437396	2013 WL_{63}	—	April 12, 2004	Catalina	CSS	PHO	1.0 km	MPC · JPL
437397	2013 WW_{63}	—	November 9, 1999	Socorro	LINEAR	DOR	2.1 km	MPC · JPL
437398	2013 WZ_{63}	—	November 10, 2009	Mount Lemmon	Mount Lemmon Survey	·	1.4 km	MPC · JPL
437399	2013 WR_{64}	—	October 24, 2013	Catalina	CSS	EUN	1.4 km	MPC · JPL
437400	2013 WN_{66}	—	November 17, 1995	Kitt Peak	Spacewatch	·	1.0 km	MPC · JPL

== 437401–437500 ==
back to top

Designation			Discovery			Properties		Ref
Permanent	Provisional	Named after	Date	Site	Discoverer(s)	Category	Diam.	Ref
437401	2013 WK_{67}	—	September 19, 2007	Kitt Peak	Spacewatch	·	2.7 km	MPC · JPL
437402	2013 WK_{74}	—	October 23, 2006	Mount Lemmon	Mount Lemmon Survey	·	940 m	MPC · JPL
437403	2013 WU_{74}	—	February 8, 2007	Mount Lemmon	Mount Lemmon Survey	·	1.7 km	MPC · JPL
437404	2013 WQ_{77}	—	November 21, 2009	Kitt Peak	Spacewatch	·	3.1 km	MPC · JPL
437405	2013 WN_{80}	—	December 14, 2004	Socorro	LINEAR	ADE	2.1 km	MPC · JPL
437406	2013 WC_{83}	—	April 7, 2011	Kitt Peak	Spacewatch	·	1.2 km	MPC · JPL
437407	2013 WM_{83}	—	August 20, 2000	Kitt Peak	Spacewatch	·	1.2 km	MPC · JPL
437408	2013 WQ_{83}	—	September 25, 2009	Mount Lemmon	Mount Lemmon Survey	·	1.2 km	MPC · JPL
437409	2013 WH_{86}	—	December 27, 2006	Mount Lemmon	Mount Lemmon Survey	·	1.7 km	MPC · JPL
437410	2013 WE_{91}	—	February 9, 2007	Catalina	CSS	·	1.3 km	MPC · JPL
437411	2013 WC_{94}	—	September 30, 2009	Mount Lemmon	Mount Lemmon Survey	V	630 m	MPC · JPL
437412	2013 WU_{96}	—	September 18, 2009	Kitt Peak	Spacewatch	·	950 m	MPC · JPL
437413	2013 WX_{97}	—	November 17, 2009	Kitt Peak	Spacewatch	·	890 m	MPC · JPL
437414	2013 WX_{99}	—	January 15, 1996	Kitt Peak	Spacewatch	·	1.4 km	MPC · JPL
437415	2013 WD_{102}	—	February 13, 2010	WISE	WISE	·	3.7 km	MPC · JPL
437416	2013 WG_{103}	—	October 24, 2003	Kitt Peak	Spacewatch	·	810 m	MPC · JPL
437417	2013 WH_{103}	—	October 8, 2007	Mount Lemmon	Mount Lemmon Survey	·	2.2 km	MPC · JPL
437418	2013 WV_{106}	—	September 17, 2013	Mount Lemmon	Mount Lemmon Survey	·	1.7 km	MPC · JPL
437419	2013 XM_{2}	—	April 24, 2011	Kitt Peak	Spacewatch	·	2.2 km	MPC · JPL
437420	2013 XS_{2}	—	October 15, 2013	Catalina	CSS	EUN	1.4 km	MPC · JPL
437421	2013 XP_{3}	—	February 13, 2010	Catalina	CSS	·	2.6 km	MPC · JPL
437422	2013 XN_{11}	—	January 10, 2007	Kitt Peak	Spacewatch	·	990 m	MPC · JPL
437423	2013 XV_{17}	—	November 3, 2008	Mount Lemmon	Mount Lemmon Survey	·	2.1 km	MPC · JPL
437424	2013 XY_{17}	—	May 23, 2003	Kitt Peak	Spacewatch	·	1.7 km	MPC · JPL
437425	2013 XE_{20}	—	January 11, 2008	Mount Lemmon	Mount Lemmon Survey	·	4.5 km	MPC · JPL
437426	2013 XO_{20}	—	February 13, 2010	Catalina	CSS	·	2.3 km	MPC · JPL
437427	2013 XO_{22}	—	April 18, 2009	Kitt Peak	Spacewatch	T_{j} (2.95) · CYB	4.4 km	MPC · JPL
437428	2013 XS_{22}	—	September 8, 2008	Siding Spring	SSS	·	2.8 km	MPC · JPL
437429	2013 XY_{22}	—	October 10, 2008	Mount Lemmon	Mount Lemmon Survey	·	2.1 km	MPC · JPL
437430	2013 XP_{23}	—	May 8, 2005	Kitt Peak	Spacewatch	EOS	2.1 km	MPC · JPL
437431	2013 XU_{24}	—	December 24, 2006	Mount Lemmon	Mount Lemmon Survey	·	1.5 km	MPC · JPL
437432	2013 XV_{24}	—	September 20, 2008	Catalina	CSS	·	2.0 km	MPC · JPL
437433	2013 XF_{25}	—	October 18, 2009	Catalina	CSS	·	1.3 km	MPC · JPL
437434	2013 XM_{25}	—	December 24, 2006	Kitt Peak	Spacewatch	·	940 m	MPC · JPL
437435	2013 YW_{1}	—	January 28, 2006	Catalina	CSS	·	2.0 km	MPC · JPL
437436	2013 YL_{5}	—	February 4, 2009	Mount Lemmon	Mount Lemmon Survey	·	2.1 km	MPC · JPL
437437	2013 YR_{5}	—	January 18, 2009	Kitt Peak	Spacewatch	·	2.0 km	MPC · JPL
437438	2013 YV_{5}	—	September 24, 2008	Kitt Peak	Spacewatch	·	1.8 km	MPC · JPL
437439	2013 YX_{5}	—	January 18, 2009	Kitt Peak	Spacewatch	·	2.2 km	MPC · JPL
437440	2013 YD_{6}	—	November 2, 2008	Catalina	CSS	·	2.3 km	MPC · JPL
437441	2013 YJ_{6}	—	September 24, 2008	Mount Lemmon	Mount Lemmon Survey	·	1.6 km	MPC · JPL
437442	2013 YK_{6}	—	September 4, 2008	Kitt Peak	Spacewatch	·	1.6 km	MPC · JPL
437443	2013 YN_{8}	—	October 28, 2013	Mount Lemmon	Mount Lemmon Survey	·	2.9 km	MPC · JPL
437444	2013 YG_{9}	—	January 1, 2009	Kitt Peak	Spacewatch	·	2.5 km	MPC · JPL
437445	2013 YN_{9}	—	March 11, 2005	Mount Lemmon	Mount Lemmon Survey	KOR	1.3 km	MPC · JPL
437446	2013 YX_{9}	—	November 16, 2006	Mount Lemmon	Mount Lemmon Survey	·	760 m	MPC · JPL
437447	2013 YA_{10}	—	May 12, 2010	Mount Lemmon	Mount Lemmon Survey	VER	3.1 km	MPC · JPL
437448	2013 YB_{10}	—	November 20, 2007	Kitt Peak	Spacewatch	·	3.0 km	MPC · JPL
437449	2013 YE_{10}	—	September 14, 2007	Mount Lemmon	Mount Lemmon Survey	·	1.8 km	MPC · JPL
437450	2013 YL_{10}	—	November 2, 2007	Mount Lemmon	Mount Lemmon Survey	·	2.3 km	MPC · JPL
437451	2013 YY_{11}	—	July 1, 2005	Kitt Peak	Spacewatch	·	3.6 km	MPC · JPL
437452	2013 YZ_{12}	—	September 23, 2008	Kitt Peak	Spacewatch	MRX	1.0 km	MPC · JPL
437453	2013 YT_{13}	—	June 26, 2011	Mount Lemmon	Mount Lemmon Survey	·	2.4 km	MPC · JPL
437454	2013 YF_{14}	—	February 9, 2008	Mount Lemmon	Mount Lemmon Survey	·	820 m	MPC · JPL
437455	2013 YT_{14}	—	April 6, 2011	Mount Lemmon	Mount Lemmon Survey	·	1.4 km	MPC · JPL
437456	2013 YY_{15}	—	February 1, 2005	Kitt Peak	Spacewatch	·	2.1 km	MPC · JPL
437457	2013 YQ_{16}	—	March 15, 2008	Mount Lemmon	Mount Lemmon Survey	·	870 m	MPC · JPL
437458	2013 YJ_{17}	—	February 13, 2001	Kitt Peak	Spacewatch	·	1.6 km	MPC · JPL
437459	2013 YK_{19}	—	January 31, 2006	Kitt Peak	Spacewatch	·	1.1 km	MPC · JPL
437460	2013 YR_{20}	—	September 1, 2008	Siding Spring	SSS	·	2.6 km	MPC · JPL
437461	2013 YN_{22}	—	December 21, 2006	Kitt Peak	Spacewatch	·	840 m	MPC · JPL
437462	2013 YV_{27}	—	November 15, 2007	Mount Lemmon	Mount Lemmon Survey	LIX	3.1 km	MPC · JPL
437463	2013 YD_{28}	—	November 3, 2008	Mount Lemmon	Mount Lemmon Survey	·	2.1 km	MPC · JPL
437464	2013 YU_{28}	—	January 27, 2003	Socorro	LINEAR	·	3.2 km	MPC · JPL
437465	2013 YO_{31}	—	June 15, 2010	WISE	WISE	·	2.3 km	MPC · JPL
437466	2013 YM_{32}	—	February 4, 2009	Mount Lemmon	Mount Lemmon Survey	EOS	2.3 km	MPC · JPL
437467	2013 YA_{35}	—	February 1, 2009	Mount Lemmon	Mount Lemmon Survey	EOS	2.5 km	MPC · JPL
437468	2013 YN_{35}	—	January 27, 2007	Kitt Peak	Spacewatch	V	730 m	MPC · JPL
437469	2013 YJ_{40}	—	November 17, 2007	Kitt Peak	Spacewatch	·	2.0 km	MPC · JPL
437470	2013 YF_{42}	—	June 24, 2012	Mount Lemmon	Mount Lemmon Survey	·	2.4 km	MPC · JPL
437471	2013 YL_{42}	—	December 18, 2009	Kitt Peak	Spacewatch	·	1.8 km	MPC · JPL
437472	2013 YJ_{43}	—	January 31, 2009	Mount Lemmon	Mount Lemmon Survey	·	2.5 km	MPC · JPL
437473	2013 YA_{44}	—	September 9, 2007	Mount Lemmon	Mount Lemmon Survey	·	1.7 km	MPC · JPL
437474	2013 YO_{46}	—	October 2, 2008	Kitt Peak	Spacewatch	·	1.8 km	MPC · JPL
437475	2013 YV_{46}	—	January 16, 2009	Kitt Peak	Spacewatch	·	2.8 km	MPC · JPL
437476	2013 YA_{47}	—	November 13, 2007	Mount Lemmon	Mount Lemmon Survey	·	2.4 km	MPC · JPL
437477	2013 YP_{47}	—	November 3, 2004	Kitt Peak	Spacewatch	MIS	1.7 km	MPC · JPL
437478	2013 YN_{49}	—	August 28, 1995	Kitt Peak	Spacewatch	·	1.5 km	MPC · JPL
437479	2013 YT_{49}	—	February 13, 2010	Mount Lemmon	Mount Lemmon Survey	·	1.2 km	MPC · JPL
437480	2013 YZ_{50}	—	November 17, 2009	Mount Lemmon	Mount Lemmon Survey	NYS	1.1 km	MPC · JPL
437481	2013 YP_{51}	—	March 1, 2009	Catalina	CSS	·	2.6 km	MPC · JPL
437482	2013 YZ_{51}	—	October 21, 2006	Mount Lemmon	Mount Lemmon Survey	·	730 m	MPC · JPL
437483	2013 YP_{54}	—	February 17, 2010	Catalina	CSS	·	2.0 km	MPC · JPL
437484	2013 YD_{55}	—	March 20, 2010	Mount Lemmon	Mount Lemmon Survey	·	2.0 km	MPC · JPL
437485	2013 YP_{55}	—	January 12, 2010	Kitt Peak	Spacewatch	·	2.2 km	MPC · JPL
437486	2013 YZ_{55}	—	May 26, 2003	Kitt Peak	Spacewatch	·	1.5 km	MPC · JPL
437487	2013 YB_{57}	—	September 22, 2008	Mount Lemmon	Mount Lemmon Survey	·	1.8 km	MPC · JPL
437488	2013 YF_{58}	—	October 6, 2005	Kitt Peak	Spacewatch	·	1.0 km	MPC · JPL
437489	2013 YJ_{58}	—	October 31, 2008	Mount Lemmon	Mount Lemmon Survey	·	2.1 km	MPC · JPL
437490	2013 YT_{58}	—	January 10, 2010	Socorro	LINEAR	·	1.9 km	MPC · JPL
437491	2013 YZ_{59}	—	October 7, 2008	Mount Lemmon	Mount Lemmon Survey	WIT	1.0 km	MPC · JPL
437492	2013 YP_{60}	—	March 25, 2006	Kitt Peak	Spacewatch	·	1.7 km	MPC · JPL
437493	2013 YT_{61}	—	February 13, 2010	Mount Lemmon	Mount Lemmon Survey	·	1.6 km	MPC · JPL
437494	2013 YA_{62}	—	December 2, 2004	Kitt Peak	Spacewatch	·	2.2 km	MPC · JPL
437495	2013 YQ_{64}	—	September 28, 2009	Mount Lemmon	Mount Lemmon Survey	V	670 m	MPC · JPL
437496	2013 YQ_{68}	—	March 18, 2010	Mount Lemmon	Mount Lemmon Survey	·	1.8 km	MPC · JPL
437497	2013 YN_{70}	—	November 13, 2010	Kitt Peak	Spacewatch	·	710 m	MPC · JPL
437498	2013 YA_{72}	—	March 27, 2004	Socorro	LINEAR	·	3.0 km	MPC · JPL
437499	2013 YE_{72}	—	June 7, 2010	WISE	WISE	·	4.4 km	MPC · JPL
437500	2013 YQ_{73}	—	January 15, 2005	Kitt Peak	Spacewatch	·	2.2 km	MPC · JPL

== 437501–437600 ==
back to top

Designation			Discovery			Properties		Ref
Permanent	Provisional	Named after	Date	Site	Discoverer(s)	Category	Diam.	Ref
437501	2013 YM_{76}	—	November 14, 2007	Mount Lemmon	Mount Lemmon Survey	·	2.7 km	MPC · JPL
437502	2013 YV_{76}	—	May 2, 2006	Mount Lemmon	Mount Lemmon Survey	·	3.0 km	MPC · JPL
437503	2013 YF_{77}	—	November 17, 2009	Kitt Peak	Spacewatch	EUN	1.3 km	MPC · JPL
437504	2013 YP_{77}	—	December 4, 2008	Kitt Peak	Spacewatch	·	1.9 km	MPC · JPL
437505	2013 YJ_{78}	—	December 24, 2013	Mount Lemmon	Mount Lemmon Survey	VER	2.8 km	MPC · JPL
437506	2013 YH_{79}	—	January 25, 2006	Kitt Peak	Spacewatch	·	960 m	MPC · JPL
437507	2013 YJ_{79}	—	December 16, 2004	Kitt Peak	Spacewatch	·	2.3 km	MPC · JPL
437508	2013 YR_{79}	—	September 4, 2008	Kitt Peak	Spacewatch	·	2.6 km	MPC · JPL
437509	2013 YQ_{80}	—	October 29, 2008	Kitt Peak	Spacewatch	·	1.9 km	MPC · JPL
437510	2013 YB_{81}	—	October 6, 2008	Mount Lemmon	Mount Lemmon Survey	·	1.6 km	MPC · JPL
437511	2013 YC_{83}	—	December 22, 2008	Kitt Peak	Spacewatch	·	2.5 km	MPC · JPL
437512	2013 YV_{83}	—	January 29, 2009	Kitt Peak	Spacewatch	·	1.7 km	MPC · JPL
437513	2013 YD_{88}	—	October 7, 2008	Mount Lemmon	Mount Lemmon Survey	·	1.7 km	MPC · JPL
437514	2013 YZ_{90}	—	August 10, 2007	Kitt Peak	Spacewatch	·	1.9 km	MPC · JPL
437515	2013 YF_{91}	—	October 23, 2008	Kitt Peak	Spacewatch	·	1.6 km	MPC · JPL
437516	2013 YK_{91}	—	July 20, 2012	Siding Spring	SSS	·	2.7 km	MPC · JPL
437517	2013 YY_{92}	—	October 11, 2012	Mount Lemmon	Mount Lemmon Survey	·	1.8 km	MPC · JPL
437518	2013 YZ_{92}	—	August 19, 2006	Kitt Peak	Spacewatch	·	2.7 km	MPC · JPL
437519	2013 YK_{94}	—	August 21, 2008	Kitt Peak	Spacewatch	·	1.3 km	MPC · JPL
437520	2013 YQ_{96}	—	April 2, 2011	Kitt Peak	Spacewatch	·	1.4 km	MPC · JPL
437521	2013 YE_{103}	—	February 24, 2006	Catalina	CSS	EUN	1.4 km	MPC · JPL
437522	2013 YG_{104}	—	November 26, 2013	Mount Lemmon	Mount Lemmon Survey	·	1.3 km	MPC · JPL
437523	2013 YB_{105}	—	February 19, 2009	Mount Lemmon	Mount Lemmon Survey	EOS	2.6 km	MPC · JPL
437524	2013 YX_{105}	—	December 10, 2005	Kitt Peak	Spacewatch	T_{j} (2.96) · 3:2	4.7 km	MPC · JPL
437525	2013 YD_{106}	—	October 26, 2008	Mount Lemmon	Mount Lemmon Survey	NEM	2.5 km	MPC · JPL
437526	2013 YG_{106}	—	May 22, 2011	Mount Lemmon	Mount Lemmon Survey	·	1.8 km	MPC · JPL
437527	2013 YR_{106}	—	September 24, 2008	Mount Lemmon	Mount Lemmon Survey	·	1.8 km	MPC · JPL
437528	2013 YQ_{109}	—	October 29, 2008	Kitt Peak	Spacewatch	AGN	970 m	MPC · JPL
437529	2013 YZ_{110}	—	May 24, 2006	Catalina	CSS	·	3.7 km	MPC · JPL
437530	2013 YR_{111}	—	May 2, 1997	Kitt Peak	Spacewatch	NEM	2.6 km	MPC · JPL
437531	2013 YX_{111}	—	July 8, 2005	Kitt Peak	Spacewatch	·	2.6 km	MPC · JPL
437532	2013 YZ_{112}	—	November 11, 2009	Mount Lemmon	Mount Lemmon Survey	·	1.2 km	MPC · JPL
437533	2013 YE_{115}	—	January 7, 2010	Kitt Peak	Spacewatch	·	1.2 km	MPC · JPL
437534	2013 YM_{115}	—	February 4, 2005	Kitt Peak	Spacewatch	·	2.6 km	MPC · JPL
437535	2013 YZ_{115}	—	December 21, 2008	Mount Lemmon	Mount Lemmon Survey	·	2.7 km	MPC · JPL
437536	2013 YV_{116}	—	March 20, 2010	Mount Lemmon	Mount Lemmon Survey	·	2.0 km	MPC · JPL
437537	2013 YE_{117}	—	October 21, 2008	Mount Lemmon	Mount Lemmon Survey	·	1.3 km	MPC · JPL
437538	2013 YU_{117}	—	August 10, 2007	Kitt Peak	Spacewatch	KOR	1.3 km	MPC · JPL
437539	2013 YF_{119}	—	February 12, 2010	WISE	WISE	·	3.8 km	MPC · JPL
437540	2013 YG_{121}	—	January 27, 2007	Kitt Peak	Spacewatch	·	1.2 km	MPC · JPL
437541	2013 YJ_{122}	—	November 19, 2007	Kitt Peak	Spacewatch	·	3.7 km	MPC · JPL
437542	2013 YP_{123}	—	February 15, 2010	WISE	WISE	EOS	2.4 km	MPC · JPL
437543	2013 YV_{124}	—	September 11, 2007	Mount Lemmon	Mount Lemmon Survey	·	2.0 km	MPC · JPL
437544	2013 YK_{125}	—	October 12, 2007	Mount Lemmon	Mount Lemmon Survey	·	2.0 km	MPC · JPL
437545	2013 YN_{125}	—	July 9, 2005	Kitt Peak	Spacewatch	·	2.8 km	MPC · JPL
437546	2013 YT_{127}	—	February 25, 2006	Catalina	CSS	·	2.7 km	MPC · JPL
437547	2013 YK_{128}	—	October 31, 2013	Mount Lemmon	Mount Lemmon Survey	·	3.5 km	MPC · JPL
437548	2013 YL_{128}	—	February 19, 2009	Catalina	CSS	·	3.1 km	MPC · JPL
437549	2013 YP_{128}	—	November 20, 2009	Kitt Peak	Spacewatch	·	1.6 km	MPC · JPL
437550	2013 YB_{129}	—	September 23, 2008	Kitt Peak	Spacewatch	MRX	1.1 km	MPC · JPL
437551	2013 YJ_{138}	—	October 16, 2012	Mount Lemmon	Mount Lemmon Survey	EOS	1.8 km	MPC · JPL
437552	2013 YE_{139}	—	September 30, 2000	Socorro	LINEAR	EUN	1.5 km	MPC · JPL
437553	2013 YC_{144}	—	May 8, 2011	Kitt Peak	Spacewatch	·	960 m	MPC · JPL
437554	2013 YN_{147}	—	April 15, 2010	Kitt Peak	Spacewatch	·	3.1 km	MPC · JPL
437555	2013 YY_{148}	—	September 4, 2008	Kitt Peak	Spacewatch	·	1.6 km	MPC · JPL
437556	2013 YP_{149}	—	November 17, 2006	Mount Lemmon	Mount Lemmon Survey	·	860 m	MPC · JPL
437557	2013 YN_{150}	—	June 10, 2011	Mount Lemmon	Mount Lemmon Survey	·	2.4 km	MPC · JPL
437558	2013 YY_{150}	—	November 1, 2008	Mount Lemmon	Mount Lemmon Survey	·	2.5 km	MPC · JPL
437559	2014 AL_{1}	—	October 21, 2003	Kitt Peak	Spacewatch	AGN	1.1 km	MPC · JPL
437560	2014 AX_{3}	—	October 21, 2007	Mount Lemmon	Mount Lemmon Survey	·	2.0 km	MPC · JPL
437561	2014 AH_{4}	—	December 19, 2007	Mount Lemmon	Mount Lemmon Survey	·	3.3 km	MPC · JPL
437562	2014 AM_{4}	—	November 18, 2007	Mount Lemmon	Mount Lemmon Survey	·	2.1 km	MPC · JPL
437563	2014 AT_{4}	—	September 28, 2003	Kitt Peak	Spacewatch	AGN	1.2 km	MPC · JPL
437564	2014 AB_{7}	—	February 28, 2009	Kitt Peak	Spacewatch	THM	1.8 km	MPC · JPL
437565	2014 AH_{8}	—	March 1, 2009	Kitt Peak	Spacewatch	THM	2.1 km	MPC · JPL
437566	2014 AU_{8}	—	November 2, 2007	Kitt Peak	Spacewatch	·	2.3 km	MPC · JPL
437567	2014 AM_{14}	—	April 17, 1998	Kitt Peak	Spacewatch	·	1.7 km	MPC · JPL
437568	2014 AX_{14}	—	September 23, 2008	Mount Lemmon	Mount Lemmon Survey	·	1.9 km	MPC · JPL
437569	2014 AZ_{14}	—	January 6, 2010	Kitt Peak	Spacewatch	·	1.7 km	MPC · JPL
437570	2014 AA_{18}	—	September 12, 2007	Mount Lemmon	Mount Lemmon Survey	KOR	1.3 km	MPC · JPL
437571	2014 AL_{18}	—	October 21, 2003	Kitt Peak	Spacewatch	·	2.2 km	MPC · JPL
437572	2014 AC_{19}	—	February 19, 2009	Mount Lemmon	Mount Lemmon Survey	·	2.3 km	MPC · JPL
437573	2014 AK_{20}	—	February 9, 2007	Catalina	CSS	·	1.7 km	MPC · JPL
437574	2014 AV_{20}	—	December 6, 2010	Mount Lemmon	Mount Lemmon Survey	·	570 m	MPC · JPL
437575	2014 AA_{28}	—	January 23, 2006	Catalina	CSS	·	1.5 km	MPC · JPL
437576	2014 AO_{28}	—	August 31, 2005	Kitt Peak	Spacewatch	·	1.4 km	MPC · JPL
437577	2014 AX_{31}	—	February 9, 2010	Kitt Peak	Spacewatch	·	1.8 km	MPC · JPL
437578	2014 AR_{37}	—	July 4, 2005	Mount Lemmon	Mount Lemmon Survey	·	1.0 km	MPC · JPL
437579	2014 AX_{39}	—	September 20, 2011	Mount Lemmon	Mount Lemmon Survey	EOS	2.3 km	MPC · JPL
437580	2014 AQ_{40}	—	March 15, 2004	Kitt Peak	Spacewatch	EOS	1.5 km	MPC · JPL
437581	2014 AQ_{41}	—	September 12, 2007	Saint-Sulpice	B. Christophe	·	2.0 km	MPC · JPL
437582	2014 AW_{41}	—	March 15, 2009	Mount Lemmon	Mount Lemmon Survey	·	3.1 km	MPC · JPL
437583	2014 AS_{43}	—	February 20, 2006	Kitt Peak	Spacewatch	·	1.8 km	MPC · JPL
437584	2014 AZ_{43}	—	October 8, 2008	Catalina	CSS	·	1.4 km	MPC · JPL
437585	2014 AK_{44}	—	July 18, 2012	Catalina	CSS	·	1.3 km	MPC · JPL
437586	2014 AZ_{46}	—	December 22, 2008	Kitt Peak	Spacewatch	·	3.8 km	MPC · JPL
437587	2014 AC_{47}	—	February 18, 2010	WISE	WISE	EOS	2.1 km	MPC · JPL
437588	2014 AU_{47}	—	October 3, 2003	Kitt Peak	Spacewatch	·	2.0 km	MPC · JPL
437589	2014 AV_{47}	—	March 5, 2006	Kitt Peak	Spacewatch	·	1.9 km	MPC · JPL
437590	2014 AZ_{49}	—	October 16, 2012	Kitt Peak	Spacewatch	·	3.1 km	MPC · JPL
437591	2014 AK_{50}	—	May 7, 2010	Mount Lemmon	Mount Lemmon Survey	·	2.9 km	MPC · JPL
437592	2014 AQ_{50}	—	September 13, 2007	Mount Lemmon	Mount Lemmon Survey	·	1.9 km	MPC · JPL
437593	2014 AU_{53}	—	December 30, 2005	Kitt Peak	Spacewatch	·	1.2 km	MPC · JPL
437594	2014 AX_{53}	—	February 27, 2006	Kitt Peak	Spacewatch	·	1.4 km	MPC · JPL
437595	2014 AA_{54}	—	February 13, 2001	Kitt Peak	Spacewatch	·	2.3 km	MPC · JPL
437596	2014 BZ_{1}	—	December 30, 2007	Kitt Peak	Spacewatch	CYB	3.2 km	MPC · JPL
437597	2014 BE_{2}	—	October 22, 2012	Mount Lemmon	Mount Lemmon Survey	HOF	2.4 km	MPC · JPL
437598	2014 BS_{2}	—	February 18, 2010	WISE	WISE	·	5.2 km	MPC · JPL
437599	2014 BG_{4}	—	December 27, 2005	Kitt Peak	Spacewatch	·	1.3 km	MPC · JPL
437600	2014 BJ_{5}	—	March 12, 2010	Mount Lemmon	Mount Lemmon Survey	AGN	1.1 km	MPC · JPL

== 437601–437700 ==
back to top

Designation			Discovery			Properties		Ref
Permanent	Provisional	Named after	Date	Site	Discoverer(s)	Category	Diam.	Ref
437601	2014 BU_{5}	—	September 26, 2012	Mount Lemmon	Mount Lemmon Survey	·	1.8 km	MPC · JPL
437602	2014 BK_{6}	—	December 30, 2007	Catalina	CSS	·	4.3 km	MPC · JPL
437603	2014 BP_{6}	—	March 18, 2010	Kitt Peak	Spacewatch	AGN	1.1 km	MPC · JPL
437604	2014 BO_{7}	—	October 26, 2012	Mount Lemmon	Mount Lemmon Survey	·	2.0 km	MPC · JPL
437605	2014 BE_{8}	—	March 3, 2009	Mount Lemmon	Mount Lemmon Survey	·	2.5 km	MPC · JPL
437606	2014 BF_{11}	—	March 25, 2010	WISE	WISE	T_{j} (2.97)	3.6 km	MPC · JPL
437607	2014 BF_{12}	—	January 12, 2008	Mount Lemmon	Mount Lemmon Survey	·	2.7 km	MPC · JPL
437608	2014 BL_{12}	—	December 27, 2005	Mount Lemmon	Mount Lemmon Survey	·	1.5 km	MPC · JPL
437609	2014 BA_{13}	—	September 15, 2004	Kitt Peak	Spacewatch	·	1.1 km	MPC · JPL
437610	2014 BL_{13}	—	January 15, 2005	Kitt Peak	Spacewatch	·	2.1 km	MPC · JPL
437611	2014 BS_{13}	—	October 21, 2003	Kitt Peak	Spacewatch	·	1.9 km	MPC · JPL
437612	2014 BY_{13}	—	September 13, 2004	Kitt Peak	Spacewatch	(5)	1.3 km	MPC · JPL
437613	2014 BC_{14}	—	January 7, 2002	Kitt Peak	Spacewatch	·	1.3 km	MPC · JPL
437614	2014 BX_{14}	—	November 1, 2008	Kitt Peak	Spacewatch	·	2.5 km	MPC · JPL
437615	2014 BJ_{16}	—	February 1, 2009	Kitt Peak	Spacewatch	·	2.8 km	MPC · JPL
437616	2014 BN_{18}	—	December 24, 2013	Mount Lemmon	Mount Lemmon Survey	·	2.9 km	MPC · JPL
437617	2014 BX_{19}	—	March 3, 1997	Kitt Peak	Spacewatch	·	5.0 km	MPC · JPL
437618	2014 BG_{20}	—	February 17, 2010	Catalina	CSS	·	1.5 km	MPC · JPL
437619	2014 BU_{20}	—	March 27, 2011	Mount Lemmon	Mount Lemmon Survey	·	1.4 km	MPC · JPL
437620	2014 BG_{21}	—	August 29, 2006	Kitt Peak	Spacewatch	·	3.2 km	MPC · JPL
437621	2014 BG_{24}	—	August 29, 2006	Kitt Peak	Spacewatch	EOS	1.7 km	MPC · JPL
437622	2014 BN_{25}	—	October 9, 2004	Kitt Peak	Spacewatch	·	1.1 km	MPC · JPL
437623	2014 BY_{25}	—	May 16, 2010	WISE	WISE	·	2.8 km	MPC · JPL
437624	2014 BJ_{26}	—	October 26, 2008	Mount Lemmon	Mount Lemmon Survey	·	2.3 km	MPC · JPL
437625	2014 BL_{27}	—	March 5, 2006	Kitt Peak	Spacewatch	·	1.2 km	MPC · JPL
437626	2014 BN_{27}	—	October 6, 2008	Mount Lemmon	Mount Lemmon Survey	·	1.6 km	MPC · JPL
437627	2014 BX_{28}	—	June 13, 2005	Mount Lemmon	Mount Lemmon Survey	·	3.0 km	MPC · JPL
437628	2014 BT_{30}	—	September 28, 2003	Kitt Peak	Spacewatch	·	3.5 km	MPC · JPL
437629	2014 BS_{31}	—	October 27, 2008	Catalina	CSS	MAR	1.5 km	MPC · JPL
437630	2014 BL_{33}	—	February 26, 2009	Mount Lemmon	Mount Lemmon Survey	THM	2.0 km	MPC · JPL
437631	2014 BO_{33}	—	October 7, 2008	Mount Lemmon	Mount Lemmon Survey	·	1.5 km	MPC · JPL
437632	2014 BG_{34}	—	December 20, 2007	Mount Lemmon	Mount Lemmon Survey	·	3.1 km	MPC · JPL
437633	2014 BV_{34}	—	June 30, 2005	Kitt Peak	Spacewatch	VER	3.6 km	MPC · JPL
437634	2014 BX_{34}	—	February 21, 2003	Kvistaberg	Uppsala-DLR Asteroid Survey	·	3.4 km	MPC · JPL
437635	2014 BE_{35}	—	November 24, 2008	Catalina	CSS	·	2.6 km	MPC · JPL
437636	2014 BF_{35}	—	December 3, 2007	Kitt Peak	Spacewatch	·	3.7 km	MPC · JPL
437637	2014 BD_{36}	—	December 1, 2008	Kitt Peak	Spacewatch	HOF	2.7 km	MPC · JPL
437638	2014 BD_{37}	—	March 28, 2009	Kitt Peak	Spacewatch	EOS	2.0 km	MPC · JPL
437639	2014 BD_{38}	—	January 13, 2008	Kitt Peak	Spacewatch	·	2.9 km	MPC · JPL
437640	2014 BH_{38}	—	February 5, 2009	Kitt Peak	Spacewatch	NAE	2.3 km	MPC · JPL
437641	2014 BE_{39}	—	August 19, 2006	Kitt Peak	Spacewatch	·	1.9 km	MPC · JPL
437642	2014 BW_{40}	—	December 21, 2008	Kitt Peak	Spacewatch	AGN	1.4 km	MPC · JPL
437643	2014 BE_{44}	—	September 10, 2004	Needville	Dillon, W. G., Eastman, M.	·	1.5 km	MPC · JPL
437644	2014 BU_{47}	—	January 29, 2009	Kitt Peak	Spacewatch	·	1.7 km	MPC · JPL
437645	2014 BV_{47}	—	August 23, 2007	Kitt Peak	Spacewatch	·	1.9 km	MPC · JPL
437646	2014 BW_{48}	—	September 19, 2001	Socorro	LINEAR	·	2.6 km	MPC · JPL
437647	2014 BU_{49}	—	January 28, 2006	Mount Lemmon	Mount Lemmon Survey	·	1.9 km	MPC · JPL
437648	2014 BX_{51}	—	October 8, 2007	Kitt Peak	Spacewatch	·	2.4 km	MPC · JPL
437649	2014 BZ_{52}	—	November 21, 1995	Kitt Peak	Spacewatch	·	1.6 km	MPC · JPL
437650	2014 BB_{55}	—	January 28, 2003	Kitt Peak	Spacewatch	·	3.1 km	MPC · JPL
437651	2014 BE_{59}	—	March 19, 2009	Kitt Peak	Spacewatch	VER	2.4 km	MPC · JPL
437652	2014 BD_{61}	—	December 20, 2009	Mount Lemmon	Mount Lemmon Survey	MAR	1.6 km	MPC · JPL
437653	2014 BP_{63}	—	January 26, 2003	Kitt Peak	Spacewatch	EOS	2.5 km	MPC · JPL
437654	2014 BS_{63}	—	October 9, 2012	Catalina	CSS	·	3.8 km	MPC · JPL
437655	2014 CH_{2}	—	April 16, 2005	Kitt Peak	Spacewatch	·	2.1 km	MPC · JPL
437656	2014 CL_{2}	—	May 13, 2010	Kitt Peak	Spacewatch	·	3.4 km	MPC · JPL
437657	2014 CN_{3}	—	July 1, 2011	Mount Lemmon	Mount Lemmon Survey	EOS	2.1 km	MPC · JPL
437658	2014 CZ_{3}	—	December 31, 2008	Kitt Peak	Spacewatch	EOS	2.2 km	MPC · JPL
437659	2014 CX_{4}	—	October 13, 1998	Kitt Peak	Spacewatch	HOF	2.8 km	MPC · JPL
437660	2014 CT_{5}	—	December 29, 2008	Kitt Peak	Spacewatch	·	2.3 km	MPC · JPL
437661	2014 CE_{6}	—	December 29, 2005	Mount Lemmon	Mount Lemmon Survey	·	1.4 km	MPC · JPL
437662	2014 CS_{6}	—	January 19, 2004	Kitt Peak	Spacewatch	KOR	1.4 km	MPC · JPL
437663	2014 CE_{7}	—	January 17, 2009	Kitt Peak	Spacewatch	EOS	1.7 km	MPC · JPL
437664	2014 CJ_{7}	—	January 20, 2006	Kitt Peak	Spacewatch	·	1.3 km	MPC · JPL
437665	2014 CL_{9}	—	October 30, 2007	Kitt Peak	Spacewatch	KOR	1.3 km	MPC · JPL
437666	2014 CA_{10}	—	November 5, 2007	Kitt Peak	Spacewatch	·	2.5 km	MPC · JPL
437667	2014 CS_{10}	—	November 20, 2007	Mount Lemmon	Mount Lemmon Survey	·	3.3 km	MPC · JPL
437668	2014 CP_{11}	—	December 13, 2013	Mount Lemmon	Mount Lemmon Survey	·	2.7 km	MPC · JPL
437669	2014 CS_{12}	—	December 4, 2007	Mount Lemmon	Mount Lemmon Survey	·	3.0 km	MPC · JPL
437670	2014 CE_{15}	—	January 13, 2008	Mount Lemmon	Mount Lemmon Survey	·	3.4 km	MPC · JPL
437671	2014 CS_{15}	—	September 24, 1960	Palomar	C. J. van Houten, I. van Houten-Groeneveld, T. Gehrels	·	1.5 km	MPC · JPL
437672	2014 CC_{16}	—	January 27, 2003	Anderson Mesa	LONEOS	·	3.7 km	MPC · JPL
437673	2014 CE_{16}	—	September 16, 2003	Kitt Peak	Spacewatch	·	1.7 km	MPC · JPL
437674	2014 CM_{16}	—	October 9, 2007	Kitt Peak	Spacewatch	·	2.3 km	MPC · JPL
437675	2014 CX_{16}	—	April 4, 2010	WISE	WISE	EMA	4.2 km	MPC · JPL
437676	2014 CY_{16}	—	February 2, 2006	Kitt Peak	Spacewatch	·	1.3 km	MPC · JPL
437677	2014 CA_{21}	—	April 24, 2004	Kitt Peak	Spacewatch	·	3.2 km	MPC · JPL
437678	2014 CC_{21}	—	December 13, 2013	Mount Lemmon	Mount Lemmon Survey	EOS	2.4 km	MPC · JPL
437679	2014 CH_{21}	—	March 10, 2003	Campo Imperatore	CINEOS	·	3.8 km	MPC · JPL
437680	2014 DE_{1}	—	August 21, 2006	Kitt Peak	Spacewatch	·	2.7 km	MPC · JPL
437681	2014 DX_{1}	—	December 19, 2007	Kitt Peak	Spacewatch	·	3.2 km	MPC · JPL
437682	2014 DX_{3}	—	February 1, 2009	Kitt Peak	Spacewatch	EOS	2.0 km	MPC · JPL
437683	2014 DZ_{4}	—	February 4, 2005	Kitt Peak	Spacewatch	·	1.9 km	MPC · JPL
437684	2014 DT_{7}	—	January 13, 2005	Kitt Peak	Spacewatch	·	2.0 km	MPC · JPL
437685	2014 DL_{8}	—	February 27, 2009	Catalina	CSS	·	3.7 km	MPC · JPL
437686	2014 DW_{8}	—	February 20, 2009	Kitt Peak	Spacewatch	HYG	3.0 km	MPC · JPL
437687	2014 DK_{9}	—	March 21, 2009	Catalina	CSS	EMA	2.8 km	MPC · JPL
437688	2014 DV_{18}	—	February 1, 2009	Mount Lemmon	Mount Lemmon Survey	·	3.3 km	MPC · JPL
437689	2014 DM_{25}	—	February 4, 2009	Mount Lemmon	Mount Lemmon Survey	·	2.3 km	MPC · JPL
437690	2014 DR_{26}	—	June 13, 2005	Mount Lemmon	Mount Lemmon Survey	·	2.9 km	MPC · JPL
437691	2014 DF_{28}	—	January 31, 2009	Mount Lemmon	Mount Lemmon Survey	·	3.1 km	MPC · JPL
437692	2014 DR_{28}	—	December 30, 2007	Kitt Peak	Spacewatch	·	3.0 km	MPC · JPL
437693	2014 DN_{29}	—	February 22, 1998	Kitt Peak	Spacewatch	·	2.6 km	MPC · JPL
437694	2014 DQ_{29}	—	March 4, 2005	Kitt Peak	Spacewatch	·	2.1 km	MPC · JPL
437695	2014 DU_{29}	—	October 4, 1996	Kitt Peak	Spacewatch	·	2.1 km	MPC · JPL
437696	2014 DP_{31}	—	May 21, 2010	WISE	WISE	CYB	6.4 km	MPC · JPL
437697	2014 DQ_{32}	—	August 31, 1995	La Silla	C.-I. Lagerkvist	·	1.8 km	MPC · JPL
437698	2014 DA_{36}	—	April 9, 2010	WISE	WISE	·	3.6 km	MPC · JPL
437699	2014 DL_{36}	—	September 13, 2005	Kitt Peak	Spacewatch	EOS	2.1 km	MPC · JPL
437700	2014 DG_{37}	—	September 3, 2007	Catalina	CSS	·	2.0 km	MPC · JPL

== 437701–437800 ==
back to top

Designation			Discovery			Properties		Ref
Permanent	Provisional	Named after	Date	Site	Discoverer(s)	Category	Diam.	Ref
437701	2014 DY_{37}	—	March 2, 2009	Mount Lemmon	Mount Lemmon Survey	THM	2.2 km	MPC · JPL
437702	2014 DX_{42}	—	March 4, 2005	Mount Lemmon	Mount Lemmon Survey	·	2.4 km	MPC · JPL
437703	2014 DU_{53}	—	February 9, 2008	Mount Lemmon	Mount Lemmon Survey	EOS	1.9 km	MPC · JPL
437704	2014 DD_{62}	—	March 27, 2008	Mount Lemmon	Mount Lemmon Survey	·	3.9 km	MPC · JPL
437705	2014 DB_{76}	—	October 1, 2005	Kitt Peak	Spacewatch	VER	2.3 km	MPC · JPL
437706	2014 DS_{80}	—	November 7, 2007	Kitt Peak	Spacewatch	·	2.3 km	MPC · JPL
437707	2014 DE_{81}	—	October 20, 2003	Kitt Peak	Spacewatch	·	1.8 km	MPC · JPL
437708	2014 DV_{81}	—	March 16, 2005	Kitt Peak	Spacewatch	AGN	1.1 km	MPC · JPL
437709	2014 DF_{85}	—	January 15, 2008	Mount Lemmon	Mount Lemmon Survey	·	2.4 km	MPC · JPL
437710	2014 DC_{88}	—	October 24, 2003	Kitt Peak	Spacewatch	·	2.1 km	MPC · JPL
437711	2014 DU_{88}	—	January 26, 2006	Kitt Peak	Spacewatch	MAR	980 m	MPC · JPL
437712	2014 DW_{89}	—	September 30, 2003	Kitt Peak	Spacewatch	·	1.4 km	MPC · JPL
437713	2014 DL_{94}	—	January 27, 2000	Kitt Peak	Spacewatch	MRX	1.1 km	MPC · JPL
437714	2014 DE_{99}	—	November 9, 2007	Kitt Peak	Spacewatch	·	1.8 km	MPC · JPL
437715	2014 DT_{102}	—	April 21, 2004	Kitt Peak	Spacewatch	THM	2.5 km	MPC · JPL
437716	2014 DV_{102}	—	September 10, 2007	Kitt Peak	Spacewatch	HOF	2.7 km	MPC · JPL
437717	2014 DL_{103}	—	June 13, 2005	Kitt Peak	Spacewatch	·	2.2 km	MPC · JPL
437718	2014 DW_{103}	—	September 9, 2011	Kitt Peak	Spacewatch	KOR	1.6 km	MPC · JPL
437719	2014 DH_{105}	—	August 18, 2006	Kitt Peak	Spacewatch	·	2.5 km	MPC · JPL
437720	2014 DB_{110}	—	November 12, 2010	Kitt Peak	Spacewatch	L4 · (8060)	7.8 km	MPC · JPL
437721	2014 DA_{111}	—	March 19, 2009	Kitt Peak	Spacewatch	HYG	3.0 km	MPC · JPL
437722	2014 DD_{111}	—	February 18, 2004	Kitt Peak	Spacewatch	·	1.7 km	MPC · JPL
437723	2014 DU_{114}	—	March 19, 2009	Kitt Peak	Spacewatch	·	2.7 km	MPC · JPL
437724	2014 DR_{116}	—	March 16, 2009	Kitt Peak	Spacewatch	EOS	2.1 km	MPC · JPL
437725	2014 DH_{120}	—	October 30, 2007	Kitt Peak	Spacewatch	·	2.4 km	MPC · JPL
437726	2014 DS_{120}	—	December 28, 2002	Kitt Peak	Spacewatch	EMA	3.5 km	MPC · JPL
437727	2014 DX_{121}	—	November 18, 2007	Mount Lemmon	Mount Lemmon Survey	TRE	2.9 km	MPC · JPL
437728	2014 DQ_{124}	—	December 4, 2010	Mount Lemmon	Mount Lemmon Survey	L4	7.2 km	MPC · JPL
437729	2014 DH_{135}	—	November 27, 2011	Mount Lemmon	Mount Lemmon Survey	L4	7.9 km	MPC · JPL
437730	2014 DO_{137}	—	October 17, 2009	Mount Lemmon	Mount Lemmon Survey	L4	7.2 km	MPC · JPL
437731	2014 DP_{137}	—	May 9, 2005	Mount Lemmon	Mount Lemmon Survey	KOR	1.4 km	MPC · JPL
437732	2014 DE_{138}	—	November 19, 2008	Catalina	CSS	EUN	1.3 km	MPC · JPL
437733	2014 ET_{1}	—	October 15, 2012	Catalina	CSS	·	2.5 km	MPC · JPL
437734	2014 EE_{9}	—	September 28, 2009	Kitt Peak	Spacewatch	L4	8.8 km	MPC · JPL
437735	2014 EF_{9}	—	December 17, 2007	Mount Lemmon	Mount Lemmon Survey	·	3.1 km	MPC · JPL
437736	2014 EC_{10}	—	November 25, 2006	Mount Lemmon	Mount Lemmon Survey	VER	3.4 km	MPC · JPL
437737	2014 EN_{15}	—	February 21, 2009	Kitt Peak	Spacewatch	·	2.1 km	MPC · JPL
437738	2014 EV_{19}	—	March 12, 2008	Kitt Peak	Spacewatch	CYB	3.5 km	MPC · JPL
437739	2014 EF_{28}	—	December 12, 2012	Mount Lemmon	Mount Lemmon Survey	VER	2.7 km	MPC · JPL
437740	2014 EQ_{29}	—	October 11, 2009	Mount Lemmon	Mount Lemmon Survey	L4	7.4 km	MPC · JPL
437741	2014 EE_{31}	—	October 9, 2004	Kitt Peak	Spacewatch	CYB	4.5 km	MPC · JPL
437742	2014 EL_{34}	—	December 16, 2007	Kitt Peak	Spacewatch	·	2.0 km	MPC · JPL
437743	2014 EM_{35}	—	February 3, 2008	Kitt Peak	Spacewatch	·	3.3 km	MPC · JPL
437744	2014 EG_{40}	—	November 19, 2006	Catalina	CSS	EOS	2.4 km	MPC · JPL
437745	2014 EY_{43}	—	June 18, 2010	WISE	WISE	·	3.6 km	MPC · JPL
437746	2014 FZ_{2}	—	September 25, 2012	Mount Lemmon	Mount Lemmon Survey	·	1.6 km	MPC · JPL
437747	2014 FH_{11}	—	January 10, 2003	Kitt Peak	Spacewatch	·	2.2 km	MPC · JPL
437748	2014 FS_{11}	—	October 22, 2006	Catalina	CSS	·	3.3 km	MPC · JPL
437749	2014 FL_{15}	—	January 11, 2008	Mount Lemmon	Mount Lemmon Survey	·	3.0 km	MPC · JPL
437750	2014 FR_{30}	—	March 23, 2003	Kitt Peak	Spacewatch	T_{j} (2.98)	4.0 km	MPC · JPL
437751	2014 FK_{40}	—	December 30, 2007	Mount Lemmon	Mount Lemmon Survey	·	2.8 km	MPC · JPL
437752	2014 FR_{42}	—	November 10, 2010	Mount Lemmon	Mount Lemmon Survey	L4	6.9 km	MPC · JPL
437753	2014 FW_{49}	—	May 24, 2006	Mount Lemmon	Mount Lemmon Survey	JUN	1.6 km	MPC · JPL
437754	2014 FK_{51}	—	November 10, 2010	Kitt Peak	Spacewatch	L4	9.6 km	MPC · JPL
437755	2014 FZ_{63}	—	December 1, 2008	Mount Lemmon	Mount Lemmon Survey	·	2.5 km	MPC · JPL
437756	2014 FM_{68}	—	December 15, 2007	Catalina	CSS	·	2.7 km	MPC · JPL
437757	2014 GM_{3}	—	November 6, 2010	Mount Lemmon	Mount Lemmon Survey	L4	6.8 km	MPC · JPL
437758	2014 GK_{39}	—	March 19, 2009	Kitt Peak	Spacewatch	·	2.0 km	MPC · JPL
437759	2014 GG_{47}	—	January 20, 2012	Mount Lemmon	Mount Lemmon Survey	L4	8.7 km	MPC · JPL
437760	2014 HP_{149}	—	September 6, 2008	Kitt Peak	Spacewatch	L4	7.1 km	MPC · JPL
437761	2014 HG_{170}	—	January 2, 2012	Mount Lemmon	Mount Lemmon Survey	L4	7.4 km	MPC · JPL
437762	2014 JD_{61}	—	January 4, 2001	Prescott	P. G. Comba	·	2.1 km	MPC · JPL
437763	2014 JX_{78}	—	January 16, 2005	Kitt Peak	Spacewatch	EUN	2.0 km	MPC · JPL
437764	2014 KJ_{4}	—	September 22, 1998	Anderson Mesa	LONEOS	·	4.7 km	MPC · JPL
437765	2014 WN_{493}	—	October 7, 2007	Kitt Peak	Spacewatch	·	5.0 km	MPC · JPL
437766	2015 AU_{2}	—	April 7, 2005	Catalina	CSS	H	560 m	MPC · JPL
437767	2015 AT_{109}	—	November 16, 2006	Kitt Peak	Spacewatch	·	1.0 km	MPC · JPL
437768	2015 AQ_{167}	—	January 4, 2006	Kitt Peak	Spacewatch	·	1.9 km	MPC · JPL
437769	2015 AD_{178}	—	February 26, 2007	Mount Lemmon	Mount Lemmon Survey	·	1.4 km	MPC · JPL
437770	2015 AP_{191}	—	December 11, 2004	Kitt Peak	Spacewatch	KOR	1.4 km	MPC · JPL
437771	2015 AC_{198}	—	September 28, 2009	Mount Lemmon	Mount Lemmon Survey	·	1.7 km	MPC · JPL
437772	2015 BO_{36}	—	September 27, 2006	Kitt Peak	Spacewatch	·	3.7 km	MPC · JPL
437773	2015 BR_{38}	—	May 9, 2005	Kitt Peak	Spacewatch	·	3.3 km	MPC · JPL
437774	2015 BL_{63}	—	April 2, 2005	Mount Lemmon	Mount Lemmon Survey	·	2.7 km	MPC · JPL
437775	2015 BS_{73}	—	December 19, 2004	Mount Lemmon	Mount Lemmon Survey	AGN	1.3 km	MPC · JPL
437776	2015 BB_{93}	—	September 11, 2007	Mount Lemmon	Mount Lemmon Survey	·	3.2 km	MPC · JPL
437777	2015 BH_{133}	—	March 10, 1997	Kitt Peak	Spacewatch	·	1.9 km	MPC · JPL
437778	2015 BN_{304}	—	March 28, 1998	Socorro	LINEAR	·	1.9 km	MPC · JPL
437779	2015 BT_{464}	—	June 8, 1999	Kitt Peak	Spacewatch	·	2.5 km	MPC · JPL
437780	2015 BR_{511}	—	November 16, 2006	Catalina	CSS	·	1.6 km	MPC · JPL
437781	2015 CS_{2}	—	December 19, 2003	Kitt Peak	Spacewatch	EOS	5.6 km	MPC · JPL
437782	2015 CT_{5}	—	January 6, 2006	Kitt Peak	Spacewatch	·	1.8 km	MPC · JPL
437783	2015 CV_{5}	—	August 20, 2001	Cerro Tololo	Deep Ecliptic Survey	·	2.7 km	MPC · JPL
437784	2015 CH_{11}	—	January 14, 2002	Kitt Peak	Spacewatch	·	630 m	MPC · JPL
437785	2015 CA_{12}	—	October 7, 2008	Mount Lemmon	Mount Lemmon Survey	AGN	1.3 km	MPC · JPL
437786	2015 CB_{24}	—	December 26, 2006	Kitt Peak	Spacewatch	NYS	1.4 km	MPC · JPL
437787	2015 CC_{25}	—	March 3, 2005	Kitt Peak	Spacewatch	·	870 m	MPC · JPL
437788	2015 CH_{32}	—	October 8, 2004	Anderson Mesa	LONEOS	·	2.0 km	MPC · JPL
437789	2015 CU_{39}	—	February 26, 2009	Catalina	CSS	·	4.3 km	MPC · JPL
437790	2015 CP_{40}	—	January 30, 2004	Kitt Peak	Spacewatch	fast	3.6 km	MPC · JPL
437791	2015 CT_{40}	—	September 6, 2004	Siding Spring	SSS	·	2.0 km	MPC · JPL
437792	2015 CV_{40}	—	January 28, 2004	Kitt Peak	Spacewatch	·	1.1 km	MPC · JPL
437793	2015 CC_{42}	—	November 7, 2008	Mount Lemmon	Mount Lemmon Survey	·	2.1 km	MPC · JPL
437794	2015 CD_{42}	—	July 30, 2008	Kitt Peak	Spacewatch	·	1.3 km	MPC · JPL
437795	2015 CE_{47}	—	March 18, 2004	Socorro	LINEAR	·	3.9 km	MPC · JPL
437796	2015 CS_{48}	—	July 29, 2008	Mount Lemmon	Mount Lemmon Survey	·	1.5 km	MPC · JPL
437797	2015 CR_{53}	—	November 26, 2009	Mount Lemmon	Mount Lemmon Survey	·	1.2 km	MPC · JPL
437798	2015 CL_{56}	—	February 7, 2002	Kitt Peak	Spacewatch	·	840 m	MPC · JPL
437799	2015 CM_{56}	—	September 28, 2008	Mount Lemmon	Mount Lemmon Survey	·	3.3 km	MPC · JPL
437800	2015 CP_{56}	—	February 3, 2010	WISE	WISE	·	2.3 km	MPC · JPL

== 437801–437900 ==
back to top

Designation			Discovery			Properties		Ref
Permanent	Provisional	Named after	Date	Site	Discoverer(s)	Category	Diam.	Ref
437801	2015 CK_{59}	—	February 11, 2004	Kitt Peak	Spacewatch	·	2.7 km	MPC · JPL
437802	2015 DH	—	December 14, 2001	Kitt Peak	Spacewatch	·	1.4 km	MPC · JPL
437803	2015 DU_{20}	—	October 8, 2008	Kitt Peak	Spacewatch	·	2.2 km	MPC · JPL
437804	2015 DF_{23}	—	February 12, 2004	Kitt Peak	Spacewatch	THM	2.4 km	MPC · JPL
437805	2015 DG_{24}	—	March 2, 2006	Kitt Peak	Spacewatch	AST	1.6 km	MPC · JPL
437806	2015 DK_{29}	—	October 4, 2000	Kitt Peak	Spacewatch	·	1.6 km	MPC · JPL
437807	2015 DG_{34}	—	May 2, 2006	Mount Lemmon	Mount Lemmon Survey	KOR	1.6 km	MPC · JPL
437808	2015 DQ_{34}	—	March 3, 2000	Socorro	LINEAR	·	1.2 km	MPC · JPL
437809	2015 DM_{36}	—	April 1, 2008	Mount Lemmon	Mount Lemmon Survey	·	1.2 km	MPC · JPL
437810	2015 DE_{41}	—	March 2, 2006	Mount Lemmon	Mount Lemmon Survey	·	2.4 km	MPC · JPL
437811	2015 DB_{42}	—	October 27, 2003	Kitt Peak	Spacewatch	·	1.5 km	MPC · JPL
437812	2015 DG_{45}	—	March 21, 2002	Kitt Peak	Spacewatch	EUN	1.3 km	MPC · JPL
437813	2015 DR_{94}	—	September 23, 2008	Kitt Peak	Spacewatch	·	1.8 km	MPC · JPL
437814	2015 DA_{99}	—	April 13, 2004	Kitt Peak	Spacewatch	MAS	840 m	MPC · JPL
437815	2015 DB_{99}	—	February 9, 2005	Kitt Peak	Spacewatch	KOR	1.6 km	MPC · JPL
437816	2015 DA_{106}	—	February 14, 2010	Mount Lemmon	Mount Lemmon Survey	·	3.3 km	MPC · JPL
437817	2015 DQ_{114}	—	April 28, 2000	Kitt Peak	Spacewatch	·	3.0 km	MPC · JPL
437818	2015 DB_{115}	—	January 15, 2001	Socorro	LINEAR	PHO	1.3 km	MPC · JPL
437819	2015 DN_{117}	—	September 18, 2012	Mount Lemmon	Mount Lemmon Survey	·	3.3 km	MPC · JPL
437820	2015 DM_{156}	—	December 30, 2005	Kitt Peak	Spacewatch	·	1.6 km	MPC · JPL
437821	2015 DZ_{160}	—	March 31, 2008	Mount Lemmon	Mount Lemmon Survey	·	780 m	MPC · JPL
437822	2015 DE_{165}	—	October 6, 2008	Kitt Peak	Spacewatch	(12739)	1.5 km	MPC · JPL
437823	2015 DV_{166}	—	May 12, 2007	Kitt Peak	Spacewatch	(5)	1.2 km	MPC · JPL
437824	2015 DC_{168}	—	October 9, 2007	Kitt Peak	Spacewatch	·	3.4 km	MPC · JPL
437825	2015 DD_{197}	—	September 15, 2007	Kitt Peak	Spacewatch	TIR	2.9 km	MPC · JPL
437826	2015 DQ_{216}	—	April 21, 2004	Kitt Peak	Spacewatch	·	1.2 km	MPC · JPL
437827	2015 DW_{216}	—	September 4, 2007	Mount Lemmon	Mount Lemmon Survey	·	4.3 km	MPC · JPL
437828	2015 EZ_{3}	—	February 24, 2006	Catalina	CSS	·	2.4 km	MPC · JPL
437829	2015 FT_{284}	—	June 11, 2004	Socorro	LINEAR	·	5.9 km	MPC · JPL
437830	3383 T-3	—	October 16, 1977	Palomar	C. J. van Houten, I. van Houten-Groeneveld, T. Gehrels	·	1.3 km	MPC · JPL
437831	3716 T-3	—	October 16, 1977	Palomar	C. J. van Houten, I. van Houten-Groeneveld, T. Gehrels	·	780 m	MPC · JPL
437832	3752 T-3	—	October 16, 1977	Palomar	C. J. van Houten, I. van Houten-Groeneveld, T. Gehrels	·	2.0 km	MPC · JPL
437833	1994 PP_{13}	—	August 10, 1994	La Silla	E. W. Elst	·	2.4 km	MPC · JPL
437834	1995 SX_{31}	—	September 21, 1995	Kitt Peak	Spacewatch	·	900 m	MPC · JPL
437835	1995 UX_{80}	—	October 25, 1995	Kitt Peak	Spacewatch	MAR	770 m	MPC · JPL
437836	1996 BL_{11}	—	January 24, 1996	Kitt Peak	Spacewatch	·	2.5 km	MPC · JPL
437837	1996 JM_{11}	—	May 15, 1996	Kitt Peak	Spacewatch	·	1.2 km	MPC · JPL
437838	1996 LH_{2}	—	June 8, 1996	Kitt Peak	Spacewatch	·	1.7 km	MPC · JPL
437839	1996 VD_{20}	—	November 8, 1996	Kitt Peak	Spacewatch	·	730 m	MPC · JPL
437840	1997 SN_{30}	—	September 30, 1997	Kitt Peak	Spacewatch	MAS	560 m	MPC · JPL
437841	1998 HD_{14}	—	April 25, 1998	Haleakala	NEAT	ATE · PHA	220 m	MPC · JPL
437842	1998 RB_{56}	—	September 14, 1998	Socorro	LINEAR	·	1.8 km	MPC · JPL
437843	1998 SY_{19}	—	September 20, 1998	Kitt Peak	Spacewatch	·	580 m	MPC · JPL
437844	1999 MN	—	June 22, 1999	Catalina	CSS	ATE · PHA	220 m	MPC · JPL
437845	1999 RA_{24}	—	September 7, 1999	Socorro	LINEAR	·	2.7 km	MPC · JPL
437846	1999 RJ_{27}	—	September 6, 1999	Kitt Peak	Spacewatch	APO	460 m	MPC · JPL
437847	1999 RE_{114}	—	September 9, 1999	Socorro	LINEAR	·	2.8 km	MPC · JPL
437848	1999 TQ_{70}	—	October 9, 1999	Kitt Peak	Spacewatch	·	900 m	MPC · JPL
437849	1999 TE_{145}	—	October 7, 1999	Socorro	LINEAR	·	1.5 km	MPC · JPL
437850	1999 TF_{218}	—	October 15, 1999	Socorro	LINEAR	·	1.3 km	MPC · JPL
437851	1999 TT_{278}	—	October 6, 1999	Socorro	LINEAR	·	2.1 km	MPC · JPL
437852	1999 TC_{297}	—	October 2, 1999	Catalina	CSS	·	910 m	MPC · JPL
437853	1999 VR_{111}	—	November 9, 1999	Socorro	LINEAR	·	1.7 km	MPC · JPL
437854	1999 XW_{16}	—	December 7, 1999	Socorro	LINEAR	·	2.4 km	MPC · JPL
437855	1999 YE_{16}	—	December 31, 1999	Kitt Peak	Spacewatch	·	2.8 km	MPC · JPL
437856	2000 AM_{213}	—	January 6, 2000	Kitt Peak	Spacewatch	·	1.6 km	MPC · JPL
437857	2000 EB_{98}	—	March 12, 2000	Socorro	LINEAR	·	1.4 km	MPC · JPL
437858	2000 LA_{34}	—	May 25, 2000	Kitt Peak	Spacewatch	·	1.4 km	MPC · JPL
437859	2000 QO_{147}	—	August 31, 2000	Socorro	LINEAR	·	1.3 km	MPC · JPL
437860	2000 SK_{66}	—	September 19, 2000	Kitt Peak	Spacewatch	·	1.4 km	MPC · JPL
437861	2000 SV_{89}	—	July 7, 2000	Socorro	LINEAR	·	1.9 km	MPC · JPL
437862	2000 SR_{131}	—	September 22, 2000	Socorro	LINEAR	·	2.1 km	MPC · JPL
437863	2000 SN_{347}	—	September 22, 2000	Socorro	LINEAR	·	3.0 km	MPC · JPL
437864	2000 TL_{44}	—	October 1, 2000	Socorro	LINEAR	·	1.4 km	MPC · JPL
437865	2000 UH_{97}	—	October 25, 2000	Socorro	LINEAR	·	1.5 km	MPC · JPL
437866	2000 WF_{138}	—	November 21, 2000	Socorro	LINEAR	·	4.1 km	MPC · JPL
437867	2000 YR_{15}	—	December 22, 2000	Anderson Mesa	LONEOS	·	2.1 km	MPC · JPL
437868	2000 YF_{24}	—	December 28, 2000	Kitt Peak	Spacewatch	·	1.5 km	MPC · JPL
437869	2000 YZ_{30}	—	December 27, 2000	Kitt Peak	Spacewatch	·	1.2 km	MPC · JPL
437870	2001 DY_{25}	—	February 17, 2001	Socorro	LINEAR	·	1.8 km	MPC · JPL
437871	2001 FN_{185}	—	March 26, 2001	Kitt Peak	M. W. Buie	cubewano (hot)	161 km	MPC · JPL
437872	2001 OK_{48}	—	July 16, 2001	Haleakala	NEAT	·	2.1 km	MPC · JPL
437873	2001 OO_{101}	—	July 28, 2001	Anderson Mesa	LONEOS	·	1.1 km	MPC · JPL
437874	2001 QV_{39}	—	August 16, 2001	Socorro	LINEAR	NYS	1.1 km	MPC · JPL
437875	2001 QR_{126}	—	August 20, 2001	Socorro	LINEAR	·	3.1 km	MPC · JPL
437876	2001 QE_{129}	—	July 20, 2001	Anderson Mesa	LONEOS	·	1.2 km	MPC · JPL
437877	2001 QE_{227}	—	August 24, 2001	Anderson Mesa	LONEOS	·	1.1 km	MPC · JPL
437878	2001 QX_{275}	—	August 19, 2001	Socorro	LINEAR	·	1.0 km	MPC · JPL
437879	2001 RX_{11}	—	September 8, 2001	Anderson Mesa	LONEOS	AMO +1km	1.8 km	MPC · JPL
437880	2001 RJ_{22}	—	August 24, 2001	Socorro	LINEAR	·	1.2 km	MPC · JPL
437881	2001 RE_{53}	—	September 12, 2001	Socorro	LINEAR	·	1.6 km	MPC · JPL
437882	2001 RX_{53}	—	September 12, 2001	Socorro	LINEAR	NYS	960 m	MPC · JPL
437883	2001 RR_{82}	—	September 11, 2001	Anderson Mesa	LONEOS	·	2.3 km	MPC · JPL
437884	2001 RA_{114}	—	September 12, 2001	Socorro	LINEAR	·	1.7 km	MPC · JPL
437885	2001 RS_{137}	—	September 12, 2001	Socorro	LINEAR	·	940 m	MPC · JPL
437886	2001 SS_{35}	—	September 16, 2001	Socorro	LINEAR	·	2.3 km	MPC · JPL
437887	2001 SR_{96}	—	August 22, 2001	Kitt Peak	Spacewatch	·	1.7 km	MPC · JPL
437888	2001 SO_{140}	—	September 16, 2001	Socorro	LINEAR	GEF	1.4 km	MPC · JPL
437889	2001 SS_{205}	—	September 19, 2001	Socorro	LINEAR	·	1.6 km	MPC · JPL
437890	2001 SK_{210}	—	September 18, 2001	Kitt Peak	Spacewatch	MAS	740 m	MPC · JPL
437891	2001 SG_{219}	—	September 19, 2001	Socorro	LINEAR	MAS	650 m	MPC · JPL
437892	2001 SS_{231}	—	September 19, 2001	Socorro	LINEAR	·	1.2 km	MPC · JPL
437893	2001 SR_{241}	—	September 19, 2001	Socorro	LINEAR	·	910 m	MPC · JPL
437894	2001 SY_{304}	—	September 20, 2001	Socorro	LINEAR	·	870 m	MPC · JPL
437895	2001 TL_{4}	—	October 7, 2001	Palomar	NEAT	·	910 m	MPC · JPL
437896	2001 TE_{185}	—	October 14, 2001	Socorro	LINEAR	NYS	860 m	MPC · JPL
437897	2001 UE_{31}	—	October 16, 2001	Socorro	LINEAR	ERI	1.3 km	MPC · JPL
437898	2001 UT_{39}	—	October 17, 2001	Socorro	LINEAR	·	780 m	MPC · JPL
437899	2001 UN_{60}	—	October 17, 2001	Socorro	LINEAR	·	1.3 km	MPC · JPL
437900	2001 UB_{79}	—	October 20, 2001	Socorro	LINEAR	NYS	960 m	MPC · JPL

== 437901–438000 ==
back to top

Designation			Discovery			Properties		Ref
Permanent	Provisional	Named after	Date	Site	Discoverer(s)	Category	Diam.	Ref
437901	2001 UE_{128}	—	September 21, 2001	Anderson Mesa	LONEOS	PHO	1.2 km	MPC · JPL
437902	2001 UD_{164}	—	September 26, 2001	Socorro	LINEAR	NYS	1.3 km	MPC · JPL
437903	2001 VT_{133}	—	November 11, 2001	Apache Point	SDSS	·	2.1 km	MPC · JPL
437904	2001 WS_{34}	—	October 24, 2001	Socorro	LINEAR	NYS	1.3 km	MPC · JPL
437905	2001 XU_{30}	—	December 13, 2001	Socorro	LINEAR	APO · PHA · critical	360 m	MPC · JPL
437906	2001 XF_{220}	—	December 15, 2001	Socorro	LINEAR	·	2.6 km	MPC · JPL
437907	2001 XC_{230}	—	November 20, 2001	Socorro	LINEAR	·	3.2 km	MPC · JPL
437908	2001 XW_{266}	—	December 9, 2001	Mauna Kea	D. J. Tholen	AMO	450 m	MPC · JPL
437909	2002 AM_{14}	—	January 14, 2002	Socorro	LINEAR	EOS	2.5 km	MPC · JPL
437910	2002 AU_{31}	—	December 23, 2001	Anderson Mesa	LONEOS	·	2.2 km	MPC · JPL
437911	2002 AL_{43}	—	January 9, 2002	Socorro	LINEAR	T_{j} (2.98)	3.3 km	MPC · JPL
437912	2002 CA_{61}	—	February 6, 2002	Socorro	LINEAR	·	2.2 km	MPC · JPL
437913	2002 CT_{205}	—	February 10, 2002	Socorro	LINEAR	(5)	1.1 km	MPC · JPL
437914	2002 EO_{7}	—	March 12, 2002	Socorro	LINEAR	·	1.5 km	MPC · JPL
437915	2002 GD_{32}	—	April 7, 2002	Cerro Tololo	M. W. Buie	res · 5:9	224 km	MPC · JPL
437916	2002 GE_{60}	—	April 8, 2002	Kitt Peak	Spacewatch	·	1.7 km	MPC · JPL
437917	2002 GO_{156}	—	April 13, 2002	Palomar	NEAT	·	1.3 km	MPC · JPL
437918	2002 JR_{2}	—	May 3, 2002	Anderson Mesa	LONEOS	·	1.9 km	MPC · JPL
437919	2002 JX_{14}	—	May 8, 2002	Socorro	LINEAR	·	1.6 km	MPC · JPL
437920	2002 LV_{13}	—	June 6, 2002	Socorro	LINEAR	·	2.2 km	MPC · JPL
437921	2002 LH_{47}	—	May 7, 2002	Socorro	LINEAR	·	1.4 km	MPC · JPL
437922	2002 NJ_{44}	—	July 12, 2002	Palomar	NEAT	·	560 m	MPC · JPL
437923	2002 NB_{70}	—	July 10, 2002	Palomar	NEAT	·	2.5 km	MPC · JPL
437924	2002 OE_{16}	—	July 18, 2002	Socorro	LINEAR	·	2.9 km	MPC · JPL
437925	2002 PJ_{104}	—	August 12, 2002	Socorro	LINEAR	·	2.5 km	MPC · JPL
437926	2002 PH_{105}	—	August 12, 2002	Socorro	LINEAR	JUN	1.1 km	MPC · JPL
437927	2002 PC_{117}	—	August 14, 2002	Anderson Mesa	LONEOS	·	820 m	MPC · JPL
437928	2002 PM_{123}	—	August 15, 2002	Palomar	NEAT	·	2.2 km	MPC · JPL
437929	2002 PY_{136}	—	August 15, 2002	Palomar	NEAT	·	590 m	MPC · JPL
437930	2002 PR_{137}	—	August 15, 2002	Socorro	LINEAR	·	1.7 km	MPC · JPL
437931	2002 PX_{155}	—	August 8, 2002	Palomar	S. F. Hönig	MIS	2.3 km	MPC · JPL
437932	2002 PG_{160}	—	August 8, 2002	Palomar	S. F. Hönig	·	600 m	MPC · JPL
437933	2002 PX_{177}	—	August 15, 2002	Palomar	NEAT	·	780 m	MPC · JPL
437934	2002 QU_{1}	—	August 16, 2002	Haleakala	NEAT	·	650 m	MPC · JPL
437935	2002 QH_{25}	—	August 12, 2002	Socorro	LINEAR	·	670 m	MPC · JPL
437936	2002 QH_{40}	—	August 30, 2002	Socorro	LINEAR	·	2.2 km	MPC · JPL
437937	2002 QX_{59}	—	August 16, 2002	Palomar	NEAT	·	530 m	MPC · JPL
437938	2002 QQ_{81}	—	August 30, 2002	Palomar	NEAT	·	870 m	MPC · JPL
437939	2002 QC_{112}	—	August 26, 2002	Palomar	NEAT	·	500 m	MPC · JPL
437940	2002 QV_{129}	—	August 28, 2002	Palomar	NEAT	AEO	890 m	MPC · JPL
437941	2002 QZ_{134}	—	August 18, 2002	Palomar	NEAT	·	1.8 km	MPC · JPL
437942	2002 RW_{138}	—	September 10, 2002	Palomar	NEAT	·	1.7 km	MPC · JPL
437943	2002 RW_{160}	—	September 12, 2002	Palomar	NEAT	·	1.6 km	MPC · JPL
437944	2002 RL_{176}	—	September 13, 2002	Palomar	NEAT	·	1.7 km	MPC · JPL
437945	2002 RS_{198}	—	September 13, 2002	Palomar	NEAT	·	1.7 km	MPC · JPL
437946	2002 RX_{226}	—	September 14, 2002	Palomar	NEAT	GEF	1.3 km	MPC · JPL
437947	2002 RT_{235}	—	September 11, 2002	Palomar	White, M., M. Collins	HOF	2.2 km	MPC · JPL
437948	2002 RJ_{256}	—	September 13, 2002	Palomar	NEAT	·	1.4 km	MPC · JPL
437949	2002 RN_{263}	—	September 13, 2002	Palomar	NEAT	·	1.7 km	MPC · JPL
437950	2002 RA_{266}	—	September 13, 2002	Palomar	NEAT	·	1.6 km	MPC · JPL
437951	2002 SD_{15}	—	August 30, 2002	Socorro	LINEAR	·	2.0 km	MPC · JPL
437952	2002 SA_{19}	—	September 27, 2002	Socorro	LINEAR	·	2.4 km	MPC · JPL
437953	2002 SF_{64}	—	September 27, 2002	Palomar	NEAT	H	510 m	MPC · JPL
437954	2002 TT_{57}	—	October 2, 2002	Campo Imperatore	CINEOS	·	2.2 km	MPC · JPL
437955	2002 TP_{60}	—	October 5, 2002	Socorro	LINEAR	·	2.3 km	MPC · JPL
437956	2002 TU_{67}	—	October 5, 2002	Socorro	LINEAR	H	550 m	MPC · JPL
437957	2002 TM_{305}	—	October 4, 2002	Apache Point	SDSS	·	600 m	MPC · JPL
437958	2002 TJ_{320}	—	October 5, 2002	Apache Point	SDSS	·	1.2 km	MPC · JPL
437959	2002 TK_{381}	—	October 9, 2002	Palomar	NEAT	·	1.2 km	MPC · JPL
437960	2002 UQ_{59}	—	October 29, 2002	Apache Point	SDSS	·	2.7 km	MPC · JPL
437961	2002 VE_{14}	—	October 31, 2002	Socorro	LINEAR	H	660 m	MPC · JPL
437962	2002 XE_{14}	—	December 5, 2002	Kitt Peak	Spacewatch	H	550 m	MPC · JPL
437963	2002 XP_{41}	—	December 6, 2002	Socorro	LINEAR	·	2.2 km	MPC · JPL
437964	2002 XD_{72}	—	December 11, 2002	Socorro	LINEAR	H	610 m	MPC · JPL
437965	2003 AL_{73}	—	January 12, 2003	Socorro	LINEAR	APO	450 m	MPC · JPL
437966	2003 EE_{33}	—	March 7, 2003	Anderson Mesa	LONEOS	PHO	1.8 km	MPC · JPL
437967	2003 FP_{133}	—	March 27, 2003	Kitt Peak	Spacewatch	·	3.4 km	MPC · JPL
437968	2003 GJ_{41}	—	April 9, 2003	Palomar	NEAT	·	1.1 km	MPC · JPL
437969	2003 HB_{58}	—	April 26, 2003	Kitt Peak	Spacewatch	·	2.9 km	MPC · JPL
437970	2003 ND_{12}	—	July 3, 2003	Kitt Peak	Spacewatch	·	3.0 km	MPC · JPL
437971	2003 OE_{4}	—	July 3, 2003	Anderson Mesa	LONEOS	EUN	1.7 km	MPC · JPL
437972	2003 QT_{10}	—	August 22, 2003	Socorro	LINEAR	·	1.1 km	MPC · JPL
437973	2003 QN_{24}	—	August 21, 2003	Campo Imperatore	CINEOS	·	1.6 km	MPC · JPL
437974	2003 QT_{55}	—	August 23, 2003	Socorro	LINEAR	·	1.2 km	MPC · JPL
437975	2003 RW_{7}	—	September 5, 2003	Socorro	LINEAR	·	1.8 km	MPC · JPL
437976	2003 RN_{22}	—	September 15, 2003	Haleakala	NEAT	·	850 m	MPC · JPL
437977	2003 SE_{24}	—	September 17, 2003	Palomar	NEAT	·	1.8 km	MPC · JPL
437978	2003 SS_{41}	—	September 16, 2003	Palomar	NEAT	·	1.2 km	MPC · JPL
437979	2003 SG_{43}	—	September 16, 2003	Anderson Mesa	LONEOS	·	1.1 km	MPC · JPL
437980	2003 ST_{56}	—	September 16, 2003	Kitt Peak	Spacewatch	·	2.0 km	MPC · JPL
437981	2003 SL_{117}	—	September 16, 2003	Kitt Peak	Spacewatch	(5)	1.1 km	MPC · JPL
437982	2003 SK_{125}	—	September 19, 2003	Palomar	NEAT	·	1.2 km	MPC · JPL
437983	2003 SY_{145}	—	September 20, 2003	Palomar	NEAT	EUN	1.1 km	MPC · JPL
437984	2003 SS_{153}	—	September 19, 2003	Anderson Mesa	LONEOS	·	1.3 km	MPC · JPL
437985	2003 SF_{288}	—	September 30, 2003	Kitt Peak	Spacewatch	·	1.8 km	MPC · JPL
437986	2003 SO_{296}	—	September 29, 2003	Anderson Mesa	LONEOS	·	2.5 km	MPC · JPL
437987	2003 SU_{307}	—	September 27, 2003	Socorro	LINEAR	·	1.1 km	MPC · JPL
437988	2003 SB_{408}	—	September 27, 2003	Apache Point	SDSS	·	1.8 km	MPC · JPL
437989	2003 SF_{423}	—	September 19, 2003	Kitt Peak	Spacewatch	·	1.2 km	MPC · JPL
437990	2003 TT_{17}	—	October 15, 2003	Palomar	NEAT	·	1.1 km	MPC · JPL
437991	2003 TZ_{47}	—	September 19, 2003	Kitt Peak	Spacewatch	·	1.4 km	MPC · JPL
437992	2003 TC_{59}	—	October 5, 2003	Kitt Peak	Spacewatch	·	3.4 km	MPC · JPL
437993	2003 UT_{5}	—	October 18, 2003	Palomar	NEAT	·	900 m	MPC · JPL
437994	2003 UL_{12}	—	October 19, 2003	Socorro	LINEAR	T_{j} (2.65) · APO · CYB · +1km	1.1 km	MPC · JPL
437995	2003 UR_{51}	—	October 18, 2003	Palomar	NEAT	EUN	1.6 km	MPC · JPL
437996	2003 UE_{102}	—	October 20, 2003	Socorro	LINEAR	(5)	1.2 km	MPC · JPL
437997	2003 UY_{118}	—	October 3, 2003	Kitt Peak	Spacewatch	·	1.7 km	MPC · JPL
437998	2003 UA_{126}	—	October 20, 2003	Kitt Peak	Spacewatch	·	1.3 km	MPC · JPL
437999	2003 UH_{132}	—	October 19, 2003	Palomar	NEAT	ADE	1.9 km	MPC · JPL
438000	2003 UG_{176}	—	October 21, 2003	Anderson Mesa	LONEOS	·	1.3 km	MPC · JPL

back to top

== Meaning of names ==
As minor planet discoveries are confirmed, they are given a permanent number by the IAU's Minor Planet Center (MPC), and the discoverers can then submit names for them, following the IAU's naming conventions. The list below concerns those minor planets in the specified number-range that have received names, and explains the meanings of those names.

Official naming citations of newly named small Solar System bodies are approved and published in a bulletin by IAU's Working Group for Small Bodies Nomenclature (WGSBN). Before May 2021, citations were published in MPC's Minor Planet Circulars for many decades. Recent citations can also be found on the JPL Small-Body Database (SBDB). Until his death in 2016, German astronomer Lutz D. Schmadel compiled these citations into the Dictionary of Minor Planet Names (DMP) and regularly updated the collection.

Based on Paul Herget's The Names of the Minor Planets, Schmadel also researched the unclear origin of numerous asteroids, most of which had been named prior to World War II. This article incorporates text from this source, which is in the public domain: SBDB New namings may only be added to this list below after official publication as the preannouncement of names is condemned. The WGSBN publishes a comprehensive guideline for the naming rules of non-cometary small Solar System bodies.

Named minor planet	Provisional	This minor planet was named for...	Ref · Catalog
437192 Frederikolsen	2012 VN_{106}	Frederik Olsen (born 1943) worked all over the world as a hydrogeologist, mining exploration geologist, paleontologist, and teacher about the Earth, the Solar System and the universe. He also has an extensive collection of minerals, fossils and meteorites, and was a founding member of Colorado Meteorite Society.	JPL · 437192
