= Vulcan (hypothetical planet) =

Hypothetical planet between the Sun and Mercury

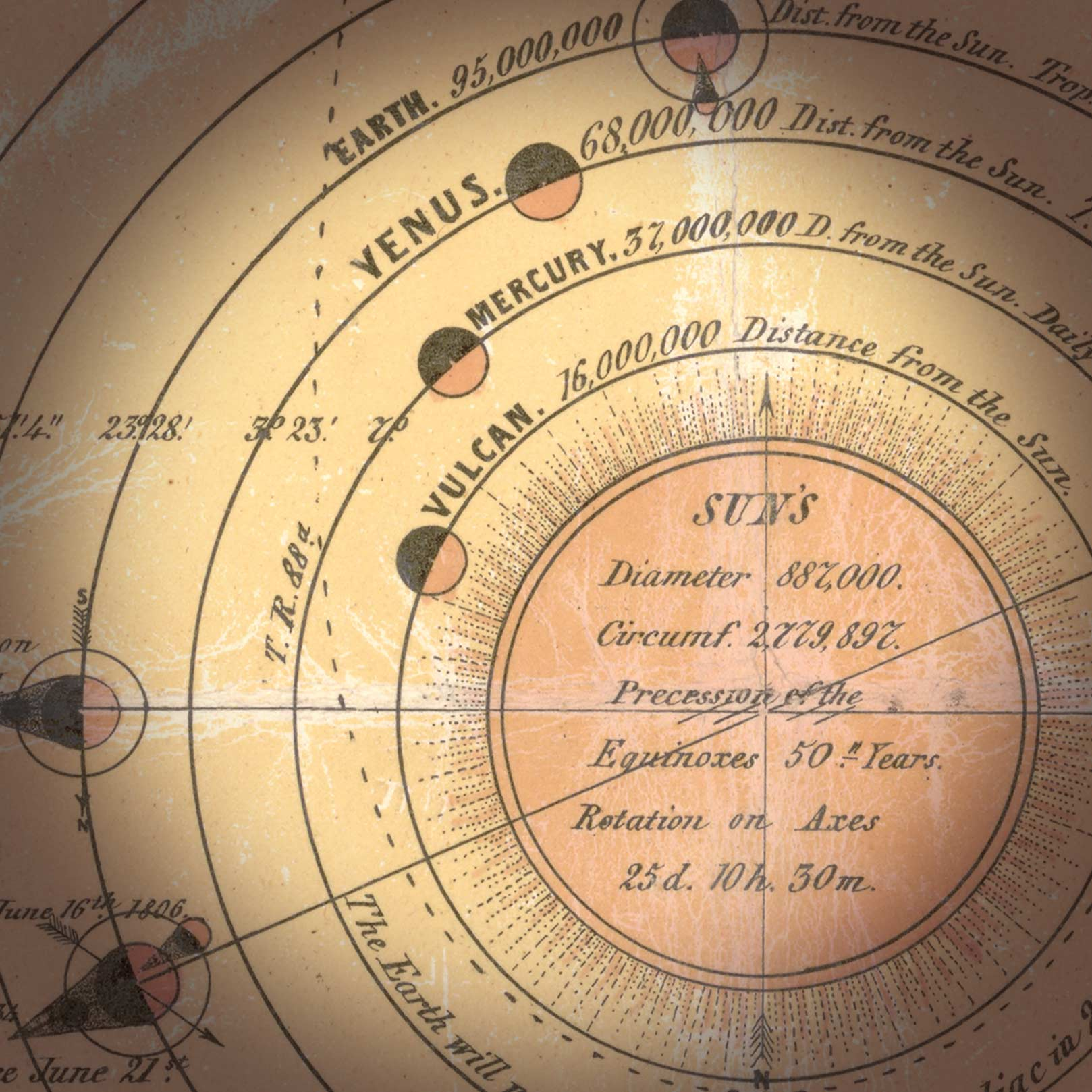
Vulcan in a lithographic map from 1846

Vulcan (/ˈvʌlkən/) was a proposed planet that some pre-20th century astronomers thought existed in an orbit between Mercury and the Sun. Speculation about, and even purported observations of, intermercurial bodies or planets date back to the beginning of the 17th century.

The case for their probable existence was bolstered by the support of the French mathematician Urbain Le Verrier, who had predicted the existence of Neptune using disturbances in the orbit of Uranus. By 1859, he had confirmed unexplained peculiarities in Mercury's orbit and predicted that they had to be the result of the gravitational influence of another unknown nearby planet or series of asteroids. A French amateur astronomer's report that he had observed an object passing in front of the Sun that same year led Le Verrier to announce that the long sought after planet, which he gave the name Vulcan, had been discovered at last.

Many searches were conducted for Vulcan over the following decades but, despite several claimed observations, its existence could not be confirmed. The idea of the planet as an explanation for Mercury's orbital peculiarities was later rendered unnecessary when Einstein's 1915 theory of general relativity showed that Mercury's departure from an orbit predicted by Newtonian physics was explained by effects arising from the curvature of spacetime caused by the Sun's mass.

== Hypotheses and observations ==
Celestial bodies interior to the orbit of Mercury had been hypothesized, searched for, and were even claimed to have been observed, for centuries.

Claims of seeing objects passing in front of the Sun included those made by the German astronomer Christoph Scheiner in 1611 (which turned out to be the discovery of sunspots), British lawyer, writer and amateur astronomer Capel Lofft's observations of 'an opaque body traversing the sun's disc' on 6 January 1818, and Bavarian physician and astronomer Franz von Paula Gruithuisen's 26 June 1819 report of seeing "two small spots...on the Sun, round, black and unequal in size". German astronomer J. W. Pastorff reported many observations also claiming to have seen two spots, with the first observation on 23 October 1822 and subsequent observations in 1823, 1834, 1836, and 1837; in 1834 the larger spot was recorded as 3 arcseconds across, and the smaller 1.25 arcseconds.

Proposals that there could be planets orbiting inside Mercury's orbit were put forward by British scientist Thomas Dick in 1838 and by French physicist, mathematician, and astronomer Jacques Babinet in 1846 who suggested there may be "incandescent clouds of a planetary kind, circling the Sun" and proposed the name "Vulcan" (after the god Vulcan from Roman mythology) for a planet close to the Sun.

As a planet near the Sun would be lost in its glare, several observers mounted systematic searches to try to catch it during "transit", i.e. when it passes in front of the Sun's disc. German amateur astronomer Heinrich Schwabe searched unsuccessfully on every clear day from 1826 to 1843 and Yale scientist Edward Claudius Herrick conducted observations twice daily starting in 1847, hoping to catch a planet in transit. French physician and amateur astronomer Edmond Modeste Lescarbault began searching the Sun's disk in 1853, and more systematically after 1858, with a 3.75 inch (95 mm) refractor in an observatory he set up outside his surgery.

== Le Verrier's prediction ==
In 1840, François Arago, the director of the Paris Observatory, suggested to mathematician Urbain Le Verrier that he work on the topic of Mercury's orbit around the Sun. The goal of the study was to construct a model based on Sir Isaac Newton's laws of motion and gravitation. By 1843, Le Verrier published his provisional theory regarding Mercury's motion, with a detailed presentation published in 1845, which would be tested during a transit of Mercury across the face of the Sun in 1848. Predictions from Le Verrier's theory failed to match the observations.

Despite that, Le Verrier continued his work and, in 1859, published a more thorough study of Mercury's motion. That was based on a series of meridian observations of the planet and 14 transits. The study's rigor meant that any differences between the motion predicted and what was observed would point to the influence of an unknown factor. Indeed, some discrepancies remained. During Mercury's orbit, its perihelion advances by a small amount, something called perihelion precession. The observed value exceeds the classical mechanics prediction by the small amount of 43 arcseconds per century.

Le Verrier postulated that the excess precession could be explained by the presence of some unidentified object or objects inside the orbit of Mercury. He calculated that it was either another Mercury-sized planet or, since it was unlikely that astronomers were failing to see such a large object, an unknown asteroid belt near the Sun.

The fact that Le Verrier had predicted the existence of the planet Neptune in 1846, using the same techniques, lent veracity to his claim.

=== Claimed discovery ===
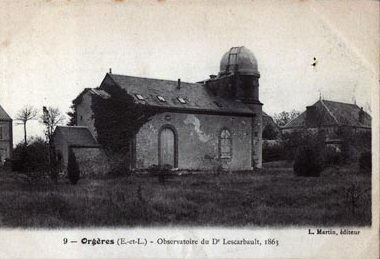
Edmond Modeste Lescarbault's observatory

On 22 December 1859, Le Verrier received a letter from Lescarbault, saying that he had seen a transit of the hypothetical planet on 26 March of that year. Le Verrier took the train to the village of Orgères-en-Beauce, some 70 kilometres (43 mi) south-west of Paris, to Lescarbault's home-made observatory. Le Verrier arrived unannounced and proceeded to interrogate the man.

Lescarbault described in detail how, on 26 March 1859, he observed a small black dot on the face of the Sun. After some time had passed, he realized that it was moving. He thought it looked similar to the transit of Mercury which he had observed in 1845. He estimated the distance it had already traveled, made some measurements of its position and direction of motion and, using an old clock and a pendulum with which he took his patients' pulses, estimated the total duration of the transit (coming up with 1 hour, 17 minutes, and 9 seconds).

Le Verrier was not happy about Lescarbault's crude equipment but was satisfied the physician had seen the transit of a previously unknown planet. On 2 January 1860, he announced the discovery of the new planet with the proposed name from mythology, "Vulcan", at the meeting of the Académie des Sciences in Paris. Lescarbault, for his part, was awarded the Légion d'honneur and invited to appear before numerous learned societies.

However, not everyone accepted the veracity of Lescarbault's "discovery". An eminent French astronomer, Emmanuel Liais, who was working for the Brazilian government in Rio de Janeiro in 1859, claimed to have been studying the surface of the Sun with a telescope twice as powerful as Lescarbault's, at the very moment that Lescarbault said he observed his mysterious transit. Liais, therefore, was "in a condition to deny, in the most positive manner, the passage of a planet over the sun at the time indicated".

Based on Lescarbault's "transit", Le Verrier computed Vulcan's orbit: it supposedly revolved about the Sun in a nearly circular orbit at a distance of 21 million kilometres (0.14 AU; 13,000,000 mi). The period of revolution was 19 days and 17 hours, and the orbit was inclined to the ecliptic by 12 degrees and 10 minutes (an incredible degree of precision). As seen from the Earth, Vulcan's greatest elongation from the Sun was 8 degrees.

=== Attempts to confirm the discovery ===
Numerous reports reached Le Verrier from other amateurs who claimed to have seen unexplained transits. Some of these reports referred to observations made many years earlier, and many were not dated, let alone accurately timed. Nevertheless, Le Verrier continued to tinker with Vulcan's orbital parameters as each newly reported sighting reached him. He frequently announced dates of future Vulcan transits. When these failed to materialize, he tinkered with the parameters some more.

Shortly after 08:00 on 29 January 1860, F.A.R. Russell and three other people in London saw an alleged transit of an intra-Mercurial planet. Many years later, an American observer, Richard Covington, claimed to have seen a well-defined black spot progress across the Sun's disk around 1860 when he was stationed in Washington Territory.

No observations of Vulcan were made in 1861. Then, on the morning of 20 March 1862, between 08:00 and 09:00 Greenwich Time, another amateur astronomer, a Mr. Lummis of Manchester, England, saw a transit. His colleague, whom he alerted, also saw the event. Based on these two men's reports, two French astronomers, Benjamin Valz and Rodolphe Radau, independently calculated the object's supposed orbital period, with Valz deriving a figure of 17 days and 13 hours and Radau a figure of 19 days and 22 hours.

On 8 May 1865 another French astronomer, Aristide Coumbary, observed an unexpected transit from Istanbul, Turkey.

Between 1866 and 1878, no reliable observations of the hypothetical planet were made. Then, during the total solar eclipse of July 29, 1878, two experienced astronomers, Professor James Craig Watson, the director of the Ann Arbor Observatory in Michigan, and Lewis Swift, from Rochester, New York, both claimed to have seen a Vulcan-type planet close to the Sun. Watson, observing from Separation Point, Wyoming, placed the planet about 2.5 degrees south-west of the Sun and estimated its magnitude at 4.5. Swift, observing the eclipse from a location near Denver, Colorado, saw what he took to be an intra-mercurial planet about 3 degrees south-west of the Sun. He estimated its brightness to be the same as that of Theta Cancri, a fifth-magnitude star which was also visible during totality, about six or seven minutes from the "planet". Theta Cancri and the planet were nearly in line with the Sun's centre.

Watson and Swift had reputations as excellent observers. Watson had already discovered more than twenty asteroids, while Swift had several comets named after him. Both described the colour of their hypothetical intra-mercurial planet as "red". Watson reported that it had a definite disk—unlike stars, which appear in telescopes as mere points of light—and that its phase indicated that it was on the far side of the Sun approaching superior conjunction.

Both Watson and Swift had observed two objects they believed were not known stars, but after Swift corrected an error in his coordinates, none of the coordinates matched each other, nor known stars. The idea that four objects were observed during the eclipse generated controversy in scientific journals and mockery from Watson's rival C. H. F. Peters. Peters noted that the margin of error in the pencil and cardboard recording device Watson had used was large enough to plausibly include a bright known star. A skeptic of the Vulcan hypothesis, Peters dismissed all the observations as mistaking known stars as planets.

Astronomers continued searching for Vulcan during total solar eclipses in 1883, 1887, 1889, 1900, 1901, 1905, and 1908. Finally, in 1908, William Wallace Campbell, Director, and Charles Dillon Perrine, Astronomer, of the Lick Observatory, after comprehensive photographic observations at three solar eclipse expeditions in 1901, 1905, and 1908, stated: "In our opinion, the work of the three Crocker Expeditions ... brings the observational side of the intermercurial planet problem—famous for half a century—definitely to a close."

== Hypothesis disproved ==
Einstein's theory of relativity, an approach to understanding gravity entirely differently from classical mechanics, proved in 1915 that there was no need for Le Verrier's hypothetical planet. It showed that the peculiarities in Mercury's orbit were the results of the curvature of spacetime caused by the mass of the Sun. This added a predicted 0.1 arc-second advance of Mercury's perihelion each orbital revolution, or 43 arc-seconds per century, exactly the observed amount (without any recourse to the existence of a hypothetical Vulcan).

The new theory modified the predicted orbits of all planets, but the magnitude of the differences from Newtonian theory diminishes rapidly as one gets farther from the Sun. Also, Mercury's fairly eccentric orbit makes it much easier to detect the perihelion shift than is the case for the nearly circular orbits of Venus and Earth. Einstein's theory was empirically verified in the Eddington experiment during the solar eclipse of May 29, 1919, during which photographs showed the curvature of spacetime was bending starlight around the Sun. Most astronomers quickly accepted that a large planet inside the orbit of Mercury could not exist, given the corrected equation of gravity.

The International Astronomical Union has reserved the name 'Vulcanoid" for asteroids that may exist inside the orbit of the planet Mercury. So far, however, Earth- and space-based telescopes and the NASA Parker Solar Probe have detected no such asteroids.

== See also ==
- Atira asteroid
- Fictional planets of the Solar System
- Hypothetical moon of Mercury
- Nemesis (hypothetical star)
- Planet Nine
- Planets beyond Neptune
- John H. Tice, weather forecaster who based predictions on supposed movements of Vulcan
- Tyche (hypothetical planet)
- Vulcan, the fictional homeworld of the Vulcans in the Star Trek science fiction franchise
- Vulcanoid
- 2021 PH27, an Atira asteroid with an intra-Mercurian perihelion, the smallest semi-major axis and the shortest orbital period of all asteroids
- (434326) 2004 JG6, an Atira asteroid with an intra-Mercurian perihelion
- 2010 XB_{11}, an Atira asteroid with an intra-Mercurian perihelion
