= Atira =

Atira may refer to:

- a titular diocese of the Catholic Church in the area of Büyükçekmece, a district in the suburbs of Istanbul
- 163693 Atira, an asteroid
- Atira asteroids
- Atira (goddess), goddess of the Earth and wife of Tirawa, the creator god, in Pawnee mythology

ATIRA may refer to:

- Ahmedabad Textile Industry's Research Association
