= Edmond Modeste Lescarbault =

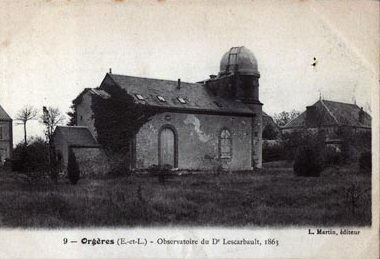
The observatory of Edmond Modeste Lescarbault

Edmond Modeste Lescarbault (1814, Châteaudun – 1894, Orgères-en-Beauce), was a French medical doctor and an amateur astronomer, best remembered for his 1859 supposed observation of the non-existent planet Vulcan.

He graduated and obtained his diploma from the University of Paris in 1848. He then started to work as a doctor in Orgères-en-Beauce and worked there until 1872 (the street where he worked is now named after him). A keen astronomer, he built an observatory with a 3.75 inches (95 mm) refractor by his house and began correspondence with various scientific societies. On 26 March 1859 he saw a small object transiting the Sun and having heard of Le Verrier's theory of an intramercurial planet named Vulcan, he wrote a letter to the astronomer and was consequently visited by him in December 1859. Le Verrier announced the discovery on 2 January 1860. Lescarbault became Chevalier of the Légion d'honneur and was invited to appear before numerous learned societies. Most likely what he had seen was not Vulcan but a sunspot.

His manuscripts, including correspondence with Camille Flammarion, are kept in the Bibliothèque Municipale in Châteaudun. He died in 1894.

== See also ==
- Vulcan (hypothetical planet)
- Urbain Le Verrier
