= 1998 DK36 =

Asteroid

1998 DK_{36}
Discovery
- Discovered by: D. Tholen
- Discovery site: Mauna Kea Obs.
- Discovery date: 23 February 1998

Designations
- Minor planet category: NEO · Atira

Orbital characteristics
- Epoch 24 February 1998 (JD 2450868.5)
- Uncertainty parameter 9
- Observation arc: (1 day)
- Aphelion: 0.9802 AU
- Perihelion: 0.4043 AU
- Semi-major axis: 0.6923 AU
- Eccentricity: 0.4160
- Orbital period (sidereal): 0.58 yr (210 days)
- Mean anomaly: 183.25°
- Mean motion: 1° 42^{m} 40.32^{s} / day
- Inclination: 2.0175°
- Longitude of ascending node: 151.46°
- Argument of perihelion: 180.04°
- Earth MOID: 0.0084 AU · 3.3 LD

Physical characteristics
- Mean diameter: 30 m (est. at 0.20)
- Absolute magnitude (H): 25.0

1998 DK_{36} is a 30-meter sized asteroid and near-Earth object that is possibly the first Apohele asteroid (Atira) – an asteroid that is always closer to the Sun than Earth – detected. It was first observed on 23 February 1998, by David J. Tholen at Mauna Kea Observatory, Hawaii, but is now considered a lost minor planet.

Although its orbital elements have not been well established, its aphelion (farthest distance from Sun) was determined to be less than the Earth's distance to the Sun (0.980 ± 0.05 AU). Therefore, it has a claim to title "first Apohele detected", if not "first Apohele confirmed", which goes to 163693 Atira. This asteroid is estimated to measure 30 meters in diameter based on its absolute magnitude 25.0 and an assumed albedo of 0.20, typical for stony S-type asteroid and common among near-Earth objects.
