= Mary S. B. Shindler =

American journalist

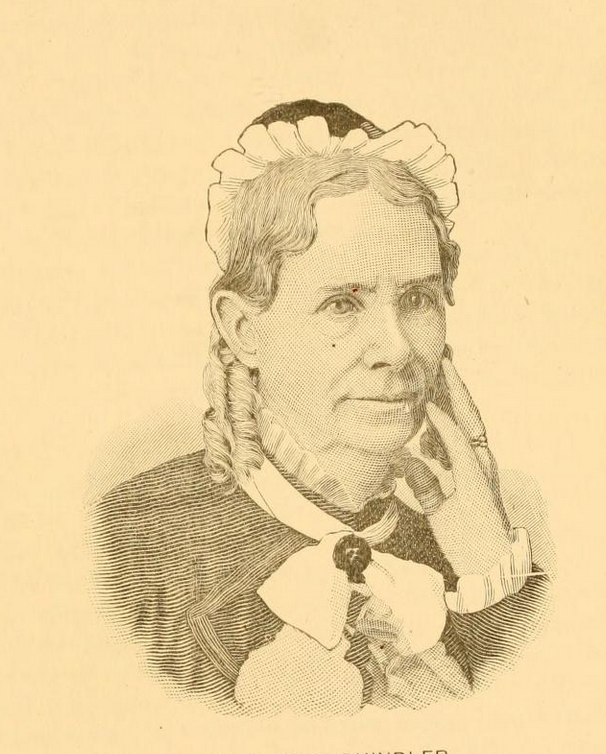
- Born: Mary Stanley Bunce Palmer; 15 February 1810; Beaufort, South Carolina, U.S.
- Died: 1883 (aged 72–73); Nacogdoches, Texas, U.S.
- Occupations: poet, writer, editor
- Spouses: Charles E. Dana (m. 1835) Robert D. Shindler (m. 1848)
- Writing career
- Language: English

Mary S. B. Shindler (also, Mary S. B. Dana and Mary Dana Shindler; 15 February 1810 – 1883) was an American poet, writer, and editor of the southern United States. She was a frequent contributor to popular periodicals, and a successful hymnwriter of the mid-19th century.

Shindler came to Texas in 1865. Her earliest book was a volume of poems called The Southern Harp. This was followed by The Northern Harp, The Parted, Young Sailor, and Forecastle Tom. She also published a book on spiritual phenomena. During a temporary residence in Memphis, she edited The Voice of Truth, a journal devoted to the interests of spiritualism and reform. Selecting some of the most popular airs, she added poems to them, a result of her own sorrow and domestic bereavement; music thus immortalized her verse. Her best known poem was "Pass Under the Rod".

== Early years and education ==
Mary Stanley Bunce Palmer was born February 15, 1810, in Beaufort, South Carolina. Her father, the Rev. Benjamin M. Palmer, an author himself, was a noted divine and pastor of the Independent Presbyterian church at Beaufort when Shindler was born. In 1814, her parents removed to Charleston, South Carolina, her father having been called to the charge of the Independent Presbyterian church in that city. Her father's congregation consisted principally of planters of the neighbourhood, who spent their summers in the city, and their winters upon their plantations. Recalling this period of her life, she later said:

“I well remember the delight with which we children used to anticipate our spring and Christmas holidays, which we were sure to spend upon some neighbouring plantation, released from all our city trammels, running perfectly wild, as all city children were expected to do, contracting sudden and violent intimacies in all the negro houses about Easter and Christmas times, that we might have a store of eggs for sundry purposes, for which we gave in exchange the most gaudy cotton handkerchiefs that could be bought in Charleston. It was during these delightful rural visits that what little poetry I have in my nature was fostered and developed, and at an early age I became sensible of a something within me which often brought tears into my eyes when I could not, for the life of me, express my feelings. The darkness and loneliness of our vast forests filled me with indescribable emotions, and above all other sounds, the music of the thousand Eolian harps sighing and wailing through a forest of pines, was most affecting to my youthful heart.”

In Charleston, she was educated by the Misses Ramsay, the daughters of Dr. David Ramsay, the historian, and granddaughters, on the maternal side, of John Laurens, who figured conspicuously in the early history of the American Revolution. The summer of 1825, her parents spent in Hartford, Connecticut, and she was placed for six months at the seminary of the Rev. Mr. Emerson, in the neighbouring town of Wethersfield. In 1826, she was placed at a young ladies' seminary in Elizabethtown, New Jersey, with the expectation of remaining eighteen months, in the hope that so long a residence in the North would invigorate her constitution, which was rather delicate; but she pined for her Southern home, and at the expiration of six months, was allowed to return to her parents. She subsequently spent several months at the seminary of the Rev. Claudius Herrick, in New Haven, Connecticut.

== Career ==
=== Mrs. Dana ===
Before marriage, Shindler had written considerably for the Rose-Bud, a juvenile periodical published in Charleston by Mrs. Caroline Howard Gilman. In June 1835, she married Charles E. Dana, and moved with him first to New York City, and in 1837, to Bloomington, Iowa. A son, Charlie, was born May 1837.

In the fall of 1838, accompanied by her parents, the young couple and their son removed to the West, spending the winter in Cincinnati, and, as soon as the river rose in the spring, they moved on to New Orleans. While in that city, a letter was received from Alabama that Shindler's only brother, who was a physician, was in Greene county, sick, and failing rapidly. A favourite sister of Shindler had died of consumption in New York, a week after the birth of Shindler's son, so the news a brother's illness filled everyone with apprehensions. Shindler's parents immediately traveled to be at their son's side, but they arrived too late as he had been buried several days. Her parents then returned to New Orleans, but instead of continuing on the Dana's western journey, they decided to return to Charleston.

A short while later, the Danas embarked in a steamer for St. Louis, where they remained for a few weeks. They then ascended the Mississippi River as far as Bloomington, Iowa, at which place they decided on spending the summer. But the summer of 1839 felt the prevalence of congestive fevers in all that region. Shindler was the first to experience the fever, and had scarcely recovered, when their child, Charlie, became ill and died. Two days before Charlie's death, Charles was taken with the same fever, and also died, after only four days. As soon as Shindler could settle her affairs, she returned to her parents home in Charleston.

To give herself mental occupation, she now began to indulge in literary pursuits. She had always been very fond of music, and finding very little piano music that was suitable for Sunday playing, she had for several years been in the habit of adapting sacred words to any song which particularly pleased her. To wean her from her sorrows, her parents encouraged her to continue the practice, and this was the origin of the first work she published, The Southern Harp. At first, she had no idea of publishing these little effusions, but having written quite a number of them, she was advised to print a few for the use of herself and friends. The work, however grew under her hands, until finally, becoming much interested in the design, she decided to publish, not only the words, but the music. She visited New York for this purpose in 1840, and the work appeared early in 1841.

She now used her pen almost incessantly, her thoughts running principally upon the subject of affliction. In the summer of 1841, she again visited New York for the purpose of publishing a volume of poems. This appeared under the title of The Parted Family, and other Poems. She undertook, also, at the request of her publishers, to prepare another volume similar in design to the Southern Harp, to be published under the title of the Northern Harp. Both of these publications were successful, passing through several large editions, and in a pecuniary way were very profitable, more than 25,000 copies having been sold.

Her next publication was a prose work, entitled Charles Morton; or, the Young Patriot, a tale of the American Revolution. This, also, was very successful. It was issued in the early part of the year 1843. She next published two tales for seamen. The title of the first was The Young Sailor, and of the other, Forecastle Tom.

In the early 1840s, she experienced a change in her religious views, which attracted considerable attention, and led to her next publication. She had been bred a Calvinist, but during the year 1844, she began to entertain doubts about the doctrine of the Trinity. Early in 1845, she avowed herself a Unitarian and published Letters to Relatives and Friends on the Trinity (1845). By far the largest of her prose volumes, it appeared in Boston, and was republished in London, going through several editions before it was finally stereotyped. In 1847, she wrote several "Southern Sketches," the first of which appeared in the Union Magazine for October of that year. During this time, her parents suddenly died within two or three weeks of each other at Orangeburg, South Carolina.

=== Mrs. Shindler ===
In 1848, she became an Episcopalian. On May 18 of that year, she married the Rev. Robert D. Shindler, a clergyman of the Episcopal Church. Her views on the subject of the Trinity also experienced a change, reverting to their original form, and putting her in communion with the church of her husband. In April, 1850, Mr. and Mrs. Shindler removed to Upper Marlboro, Maryland, near to his native place, which was Shepherdstown, Virginia. In August, 1851, they removed to Shelbyville, Kentucky, Rev. Shindler having accepted a Professorship in Shelby College. In 1869, they removed to Nacogdoches, Texas, her husband dying there in 1874.

During a temporary residence in Memphis, she edited The Voice of Truth, a journal devoted to the interests of spiritualism and reform. She died at Nacogdoches in 1883.

== Selected works ==
- The Southern Harp (Boston, 1840)
- The Northern Harp (New York, 1841)
- The Parted Family, and other Poems (1842)
- The Temperance Lyre (1842)
- Charles Morton, or the Young Patriot (1843)
- The Young Sailor (1844)
- Forecastle Tour (1844)
- Letters to Relatives and Friends on the Trinity (1845)
- A Southerner among the Spirits (1877)
