= 2013 JX28 =

Asteroid

2013 JX_{28}
Discovery
- Discovered by: Pan-STARRS 1
- Discovery date: 11 May 2013 (25 May 2006)

Designations
- Alternative designations: 2006 KZ_{39}
- Minor planet category: Atira (Aten asteroid subclass); Near-Earth object

Orbital characteristics
- Epoch 13 January 2016 (JD 2457400.5)
- Uncertainty parameter 1
- Observation arc: 2893 days (7.92 yr)
- Aphelion: 0.9397700 AU (140.58759 Gm) (Q)
- Perihelion: 0.2618791 AU (39.17656 Gm) (q)
- Semi-major axis: 0.6008245 AU (89.88207 Gm) (a)
- Eccentricity: 0.5641339 (e)
- Orbital period (sidereal): 0.47 yr (170.1 d)
- Mean anomaly: 78.308816° (M)
- Mean motion: 2.116326°/day (n)
- Inclination: 10.76379° (i)
- Longitude of ascending node: 39.96294° (Ω)
- Argument of perihelion: 354.88173° (ω)
- Earth MOID: 0.0685652 AU (10.25721 Gm)
- Jupiter MOID: 4.48856 AU (671.479 Gm)

Physical characteristics
- Dimensions: ~300 m
- Absolute magnitude (H): 20.1

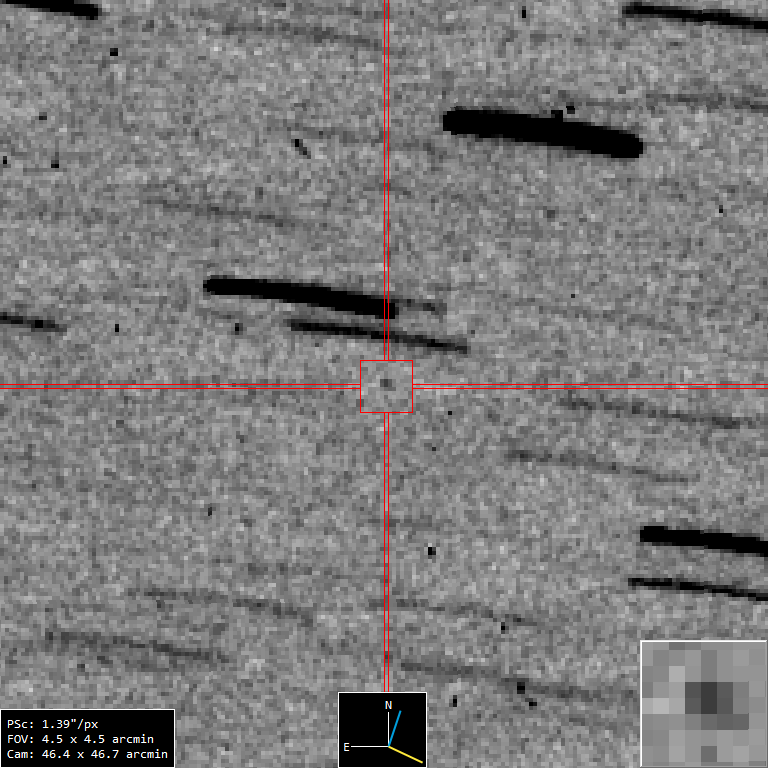
2013 JX28

2013 JX_{28} is an Atira asteroid, a type of Aten asteroid, that orbits entirely within Earth's orbit. It orbits very close to the Sun, having the eighth smallest semi-major axis of any minor planet in the Solar System. At its closest, it is only 0.26 AU (39,000,000 km; 24,000,000 mi) from the Sun, but more than 100 minor planets have a smaller perihelion distance.

Despite being officially classified as a near-Earth object, 2013 JX_{28} has a MOID (minimum orbit intersection distance) with Earth of ~0.067 AU, making it highly unlikely to ever hit Earth. For comparison, the Moon orbits Earth at about 1/26th this distance.

== Physical characteristics ==
2013 JX_{28} has an absolute magnitude (H) of 20.1, which means it is rather small, with the size being approximately 300 meters based on an assumed albedo of 0.15. Its albedo is not known, so a size estimate is not certain. Assuming the albedo is between 0.05 and 0.25, it is somewhere between 260–580 meters in diameter.

163693 Atira, an asteroid with an orbit similar to 2013 JX_{28}, for comparison, has an absolute magnitude of 16.28 and is notably larger.

== Close approaches ==
As a near-Earth object, 2013 JX_{28} often comes within 0.1 AU (15,000,000 km; 9,300,000 mi)] of Earth. On 29 April 2014, it traveled to 0.0843 AU from Earth, about 33 times further than the Moon. Below is a list of close approaches until 2100 where 2013 JX_{28} travels closer than 0.1 AU to Earth.

date	distance (AU)
2000-04-20	0.0913
2007-04-25	0.0682
2014-04-29	0.0843
2034-04-21	0.0888
2041-04-25	0.0680
2048-04-29	0.0849
2068-04-21	0.0863
2075-04-26	0.0676
2082-04-30	0.0890
