= David J. Tholen =

American astronomer

David Tholen
- Born: 1955 (age 70–71)
- Education: University of Kansas (BS); University of Arizona (PhD)
- Known for: Search for minor planets
- Awards: Harold C. Urey Prize (1990)
- Scientific career
- Fields: Astronomy; Planetary science
- Thesis: Asteroid Taxonomy from Cluster Analysis of Photometry. (1984)
- Doctoral advisor: Benjamin Zellner
- Website: legacy.ifa.hawaii.edu/faculty/tholen/

Minor planets discovered: 66
see § List of discovered minor planets

David James Tholen (born 1955) is an American astronomer at the Institute for Astronomy of the University of Hawaiʻi. He holds a 1978 B.S. from the University of Kansas, a 1984 PhD from the University of Arizona, and specializes in planetary and Solar System astronomy. He is a discoverer of minor planets and known for the Tholen spectral classification scheme used on asteroids.

== Professional life ==
Tholen has discovered a number of asteroids, including the lost 1998 DK36, which may be an Apohele asteroid, and 2004 XZ_{130}, which certainly is; in fact, it had the smallest semimajor axis and aphelion distance among the known asteroids (and still holds both records among numbered asteroids as of March 2010). He won the H. C. Urey Prize in 1990.

He co-discovered the asteroid 99942 Apophis (previously known as 2004 MN4). This asteroid will closely approach Earth on April 13, 2029 and very briefly appear as bright as a third magnitude star.

In 1995, Tholen obtained images of the then newly discovered comet Hale-Bopp at a time when the comet was moving very slowly with respect to the background stars, thus permitting the red- green- and blue-filtered images to be combined into a color composite without the background stars appearing as separately colored dots. This color composite image was made publicly accessible via the Institute of Astronomy's web site.

Later, then postdoc at University of Hawaiʻi, Olivier R. Hainaut discovered that a nearly identical image was being discussed by late-night radio host Art Bell and one of his guests, Courtney Brown, who claimed that it proved the existence of an unnatural object following the comet, something supposedly seen by those who had learned how to engage in the technique of "remote viewing". The image provided to Bell by Brown, and eventually made public on Bell's web site, did indeed show an object next to the comet that did not appear in archival images of the sky. In reality, that image had been digitally altered from the original image posted by Tholen, presumably by taking the image of a star near the edge of the frame, adding it next to the comet, and then trimming away the outer edges of the frame.

Tholen and Hainaut exposed the fraud by producing the original image, which showed no such additional object. Nevertheless, some conspiracy theorists maintained that Brown's version was actually the original image and that Tholen had removed the additional object from the one on the Institute's web site. The Heaven's Gate cult was so convinced that the additional object was a spaceship coming to take them away from Earth that they committed mass suicide.

The Mars-crosser asteroid 3255 Tholen, discovered by Edward Bowell in 1980, is named after David Tholen.

== Personal interests ==
David Tholen and Roy Tucker, co-discovers of 99942 Apophis, are both fans of the TV series Stargate SG-1, which influenced the naming of the asteroid. The show's most persistent villain is "Apophis", an alien also named for the Egyptian god. "We considered a number of names, but 'Apophis' kept floating to the top," says Tucker. "Apophis was a very fitting name for 2004 MN_{4} not only because of its threatening nature, but also because of its evolution from an Aten asteroid to an Apollo asteroid during the 2029 encounter."

Tholen is a fan of the University of Kansas Jayhawks college basketball team and the Kansas City Royals Major League Baseball team.

He also plays clarinet and bass clarinet for the Honolulu Community Concert Band and the Oahu Community Orchestra.

He is also a user of the OS/2, Linux, Windows, Solaris, and Mac OS operating systems.

Tholen frequently posts to various Usenet groups using the alias tholen@antispam.ham.

== List of discovered minor planets ==
3124 Kansas	3 November 1981	list
11606 Almary	19 October 1995	list
17045 Markert	22 March 1999	list
(24978) 1998 HJ151	28 April 1998	list^{[A]}^{[B]}^{[C]}
(27002) 1998 DV_{9}	23 February 1998	list^{[D]}
49036 Pelion	21 August 1998	list^{[D]}
(72912) 2001 OA_{84}	18 July 2001	list
(96744) 1999 OW_{3}	18 July 1999	list^{[D]}
(97725) 2000 GB_{147}	2 April 2000	list^{[D]}
99942 Apophis	19 June 2004	list^{[E]}^{[F]}
(101818) 1999 JD_{13}	14 May 1999	list^{[D]}
(103501) 2000 AT_{245}	8 January 2000	list^{[D]}
(124198) 2001 OH_{77}	18 July 2001	list
(137911) 2000 AB_{246}	8 January 2000	list^{[D]}
(139478) 2001 OP_{104}	19 July 2001	list
(141498) 2002 EZ_{16}	8 March 2002	list
(160848) 2001 BN_{82}	19 January 2001	list
(164294) 2004 XZ_{130}	13 December 2004	list
(164405) 2005 UK_{504}	24 October 2005	list
(164406) 2005 UV_{504}	24 October 2005	list
(168613) 2000 AA_{246}	7 January 2000	list^{[D]}
(168828) 2000 SY_{320}	29 September 2000	list
(190208) 2006 AQ	2 January 2006	list
(198968) 2005 UF_{506}	24 October 2005	list
(198971) 2005 UU_{512}	31 October 2005	list

(202420) 2005 UO_{506}	24 October 2005	list
(209923) 2005 UX_{504}	24 October 2005	list
(218017) 2001 XV_{266}	9 December 2001	list
(229495) 2005 UG_{508}	24 October 2005	list
(231134) 2005 TU_{45}	5 October 2005	list
(231199) 2005 UO_{505}	24 October 2005	list
(231200) 2005 UZ_{505}	24 October 2005	list
(233166) 2005 UF_{508}	24 October 2005	list
(238850) 2005 UL_{530}	24 October 2005	list
(240790) 2005 UH_{505}	24 October 2005	list
(248508) 2005 UY_{504}	24 October 2005	list
(250706) 2005 RR_{6}	4 September 2005	list
(265742) 2005 UG_{510}	24 October 2005	list
(268427) 2005 UJ_{506}	24 October 2005	list
(276891) 2004 RH_{340}	15 September 2004	list
(277451) 2005 UT_{504}	24 October 2005	list
(280491) 2004 MO_{7}	16 June 2004	list
(280742) 2005 LY_{42}	8 June 2005	list
(281070) 2006 OY_{10}	21 July 2006	list
(284133) 2005 UP_{504}	24 October 2005	list
(290759) 2005 UR_{505}	24 October 2005	list
(303930) 2005 UZ_{503}	24 October 2005	list
(306798) 2001 OW_{94}	20 July 2001	list
(309203) 2007 GG	7 April 2007	list
(326354) 2000 SJ_{344}	30 September 2000	list^{[D]}

(327398) 2005 UL_{505}	24 October 2005	list
(357129) 2001 XU_{266}	9 December 2001	list
(363071) 2000 GD_{147}	3 April 2000	list^{[D]}
(363831) 2005 PY_{16}	1 August 2005	list
(383165) 2005 VJ_{5}	7 November 2005	list
(396816) 2004 QU_{28}	17 August 2004	list
(405762) 2005 YO_{180}	29 December 2005	list
(437908) 2001 XW_{266}	9 December 2001	list
(440680) 2005 YW_{36}	23 December 2005	list
(455951) 2005 UQ_{504}	24 October 2005	list
(474212) 2000 SH_{344}	29 September 2000	list^{[D]}
(480852) 2000 WK_{192}	24 November 2000	list
(481027) 2004 XN_{44}	13 December 2004	list
(503858) 1998 HQ_{151}	28 April 1998	list^{[A]}^{[B]}^{[C]}
541132 Leleākūhonua	13 October 2015	list^{[B]}^{[G]}
(541152) 2017 EU_{9}	24 April 2005	list
Co-discovery made with:^{A} J. X. Luu^{B} C. Trujillo^{C} D. C. Jewitt^{D} R. J. Whiteley^{E} R. A. Tucker^{F} F. Bernardi^{G} S. S. Sheppard

== See also ==
- Asteroid spectral types
