= 3255 Tholen =

Mars-crossing asteroid

Discovery
- Discovered by: E. Bowell
- Discovery site: Anderson Mesa Stn.
- Discovery date: 2 September 1980

Designations
- Named after: David J. Tholen (American astronomer)
- Alternative designations: 1980 RA · 1969 SD
- Minor planet category: Mars-crosser

Orbital characteristics
- Epoch 23 March 2018 (JD 2458200.5)
- Uncertainty parameter 0
- Observation arc: 48.67 yr (17,775 d)
- Aphelion: 3.2354 AU
- Perihelion: 1.5089 AU
- Semi-major axis: 2.3721 AU
- Eccentricity: 0.3639
- Orbital period (sidereal): 3.65 yr (1,334 d)
- Mean anomaly: 59.215°
- Mean motion: 0° 16^{m} 11.28^{s} / day
- Inclination: 21.353°
- Longitude of ascending node: 337.22°
- Argument of perihelion: 79.142°
- Known satellites: 1

Physical characteristics
- Mean diameter: 4.023±0.854 km 5.08±1.02 km 6.76±0.17 km
- Synodic rotation period: 2.95±0.01 h (Note: Skiff, B.A. (2013) web: rotation period 2.95±0.01 and 2.95±0.02 hours with a brightness amplitude of 0.24 and 0.28 mag, respectively. Quality code is 3-/3-. Summary figures for (3255) Tholen at the LCDB.)
- Geometric albedo: 0.142; 0.299; 0.341
- Spectral type: SMASS = S S (Bus–DeMeo)
- Absolute magnitude (H): 13.4; 13.60

3255 Tholen, provisional designation 1980 RA, is a stony binary asteroid, Mars-crosser and relatively fast rotator, that measures approximately 5.1 kilometers (3.2 miles) in diameter. It was discovered on 2 September 1980, by American astronomer Edward Bowell at Lowell's Anderson Mesa Station in Flagstaff, Arizona. The S-type asteroid has a rotation period of 2.95 hours. It was later named after American astronomer David Tholen.

== Orbit and classification ==
Tholen is a Mars-crossing asteroid, crossing the orbit of Mars at 1.666 AU. Members of this dynamically unstable group are located between the main belt and near-Earth populations. It orbits the Sun at a distance of 1.5–3.2 AU once every 3 years and 8 months (1,334 days; semi-major axis of 2.37 AU). Its orbit has an eccentricity of 0.36 and an inclination of 21° with respect to the ecliptic. In September 1969, it was first observed as 1969 SD at the Argentinian El Leoncito site, extending the body's observation arc by 11 years prior to its official discovery observation at Anderson Mesa.

== Naming ==
This minor planet was named after David J. Tholen (born 1955), a discoverer of minor planets and planetary scientist at the Institute for Astronomy of the University of Hawaii, known for his eight-color taxonomic scheme on minor planets. The official naming citation was published by the Minor Planet Center on 14 April 1987 (M.P.C. 11749).

== Physical characteristics ==
In the SMASS classification, as well as in the Bus–DeMeo classification, Tholen is a common S-type asteroid.

=== Diameter and albedo ===
According to the space-based survey carried out by the Japanese Akari satellite and NASA's NEOWISE mission, the asteroid measures between 4.0 and 6.8 kilometers in diameter, and its surface has an albedo of 0.14 and 0.34, respectively, while the Collaborative Asteroid Lightcurve Link assumes a standard albedo for stony asteroids of 0.20 and derives a diameter of 5.1 kilometers with an absolute magnitude of 13.84.

=== Rotation period ===
Several rotational lightcurves were obtained for this asteroid from photometric observations.

In September 2013, Italian astronomer Andrea Ferrero at the Bigmuskie Observatory (B88) in Mombercelli, Italy, derived a rotation period of 2.947±0.001 hours with a brightness variation of 0.11 in magnitude (U=2), while two month later, in November 2013, astronomer Brian A. Skiff obtained two lightcurves that both gave a period of 2.95 and an amplitude of 0.24 and 0.28 in magnitude, respectively (U=3-/3-).

The results supersede two older lightcurves from 1991 and 2002, that gave a period of 3±1 and 6 hours, respectively (U=1/1).

== Satellite ==
On 19 October 2024, one natural satellite (or moon) was discovered to be orbiting Tholen. The discovery was made using information from stellar occultations by a team of astronomers, consisting of V. Benishek, P. Pravec, M. Husarik, M. Pikler, G. Cervak, and N. Ruocco at the Skalnaté pleso Observatory, the Sopot Observatory, and the Osservatorio Astronomico Nastro Verde in Slovakia, Serbia, and Italy respectively. It was announced on 18 February 2025.

Based on the data collected from the occultations, the moon appears to be tidally locked to Tholen, with a rotational and orbital period of 44.36 ± 0.07 h. Its diameter has a derived value of less than 1.65 km (1.03 mi), and it is suggested that it takes on a more elongated shape, since it has a light-curve amplitude of 0.10.
