= 2020 HA10 =

Near-Earth asteroid

2020 HA_{10}
Discovery
- Discovered by: Mount Lemmon Survey
- Discovery site: Mount Lemmon Obs.
- Discovery date: 28 April 2020 (first observed only)

Designations
- Minor planet category: NEO · Atira

Orbital characteristics
- Epoch 21 November 2025 (JD 2461000.5)
- Uncertainty parameter 1
- Observation arc: 14.61 yr (5338 days)
- Aphelion: 0.9470 AU
- Perihelion: 0.6924 AU
- Semi-major axis: 0.8197 AU
- Eccentricity: 0.1553
- Orbital period (sidereal): 0.74 yr (271.1 d)
- Mean anomaly: 295.53°
- Mean motion: 1° 19^{m} 41.16^{s} / day
- Inclination: 49.65°
- Longitude of ascending node: 103.41°
- Argument of perihelion: 26.71°
- Earth MOID: 0.0890 AU

Physical characteristics
- Mean diameter: 100–500 m (est. at 0.05–0.15)
- Absolute magnitude (H): 19.0±0.8

2020 HA_{10} is a near-Earth object of the Atira group. It was discovered at G=20.4 mag on 2020 April 28 by the Mount Lemmon Survey using the 0.5 m reflector + 10 K CCD.

2020 HA_{10} orbits the Sun at a distance of 0.7–0.9 AU once every 9 months (271 days; semi-major axis of 0.82 AU). Its orbit has an eccentricity of 0.15 and an unusually high inclination of 50° with respect to the ecliptic. The orbital evolution of 2020 HA_{10} leads the object into the Aten orbital realm periodically.
