= (434326) 2004 JG6 =

Near-Earth asteroid

(434326) 2004 JG_{6}
Discovery
- Discovered by: LONEOS
- Discovery site: Anderson Mesa Stn.
- Discovery date: 11 May 2004

Designations
- Minor planet category: Atira; NEO; PHA; Mercury-crosser; Venus-crosser

Orbital characteristics
- Epoch 4 September 2017 (JD 2458000.5)
- Uncertainty parameter 1
- Observation arc: 11.05 yr (4,035 days)
- Aphelion: 0.9726 AU
- Perihelion: 0.2978 AU
- Semi-major axis: 0.6352 AU
- Eccentricity: 0.5312
- Orbital period (sidereal): 0.51 yr (185 days)
- Mean anomaly: 315.54°
- Mean motion: 1° 56^{m} 48.48^{s} / day
- Inclination: 18.945°
- Longitude of ascending node: 37.032°
- Argument of perihelion: 352.99°
- Earth MOID: 0.0381 AU (14.8 LD)

Physical characteristics
- Mean diameter: 0.6–1.4 km
- Absolute magnitude (H): 18.4

(434326) 2004 JG_{6} is an eccentric, sub-kilometer sized asteroid, classified as a near-Earth object and potentially hazardous asteroid of the Atira group. It is one of the closest orbiting objects to the Sun. While its perihelion lies within the orbit of Mercury its orbital trajectory is highly elliptical, causing its aphelion to cross the orbit of Venus. Therefore, it does not fit the criteria for a vulcanoid or ꞋAylóꞌchaxnim asteroid, which would require it have a wholly intra-Mercurian and intra-Venusian orbit respectively.

Only the second Atira asteroid to be confirmed, 2004 JG_{6} was at the time of its discovery the asteroid with the smallest known semi-major axis, however it has since been eclipsed in this regard by several other asteroids.

== Discovery ==
2004 JG_{6} was discovered on 11 May 2004, by leading astronomer Brian Skiff of the Lowell Observatory Near-Earth-Object Search (LONEOS) at Anderson Mesa Station near Flagstaff, United States.

The body's observation arc begins with its official discovery observation at Anderson Mesa, as no precoveries were taken and no prior identifications were made.

== Orbit and classification ==
It orbits the Sun at a distance of 0.3–1.0 AU once every 6 months (185 days). Its orbit has an eccentricity of 0.53 and an inclination of 19° with respect to the ecliptic.

2004 JG_{6} is the second known Atira asteroid – the first being the group's namesake 163693 Atira – which means its entire orbit lies within that of the Earth. Its orbital period is less than that of Venus, making it one of the closest known objects to the Sun, after Mercury. Due to its eccentric orbit, it crosses the orbits of both Mercury and Venus, which also makes it a Mercury- and Venus-crosser. It has an Earth minimum orbital intersection distance of 0.0381 AU (5,700,000 km) which translates into 14.8 lunar distances.

== Physical characteristics ==
Based on a generic conversion from absolute magnitude, the asteroid measures between 0.6 and 1.4 kilometers in diameter.

== Naming ==
As of 2023, this minor planet remains unnamed.
