= Atira (goddess) =

Mother goddess of the Native American Pawnee

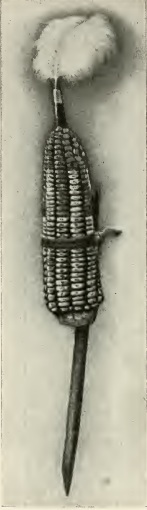
The symbol used to represent the goddess Atira in the Pawnee Hako ceremony

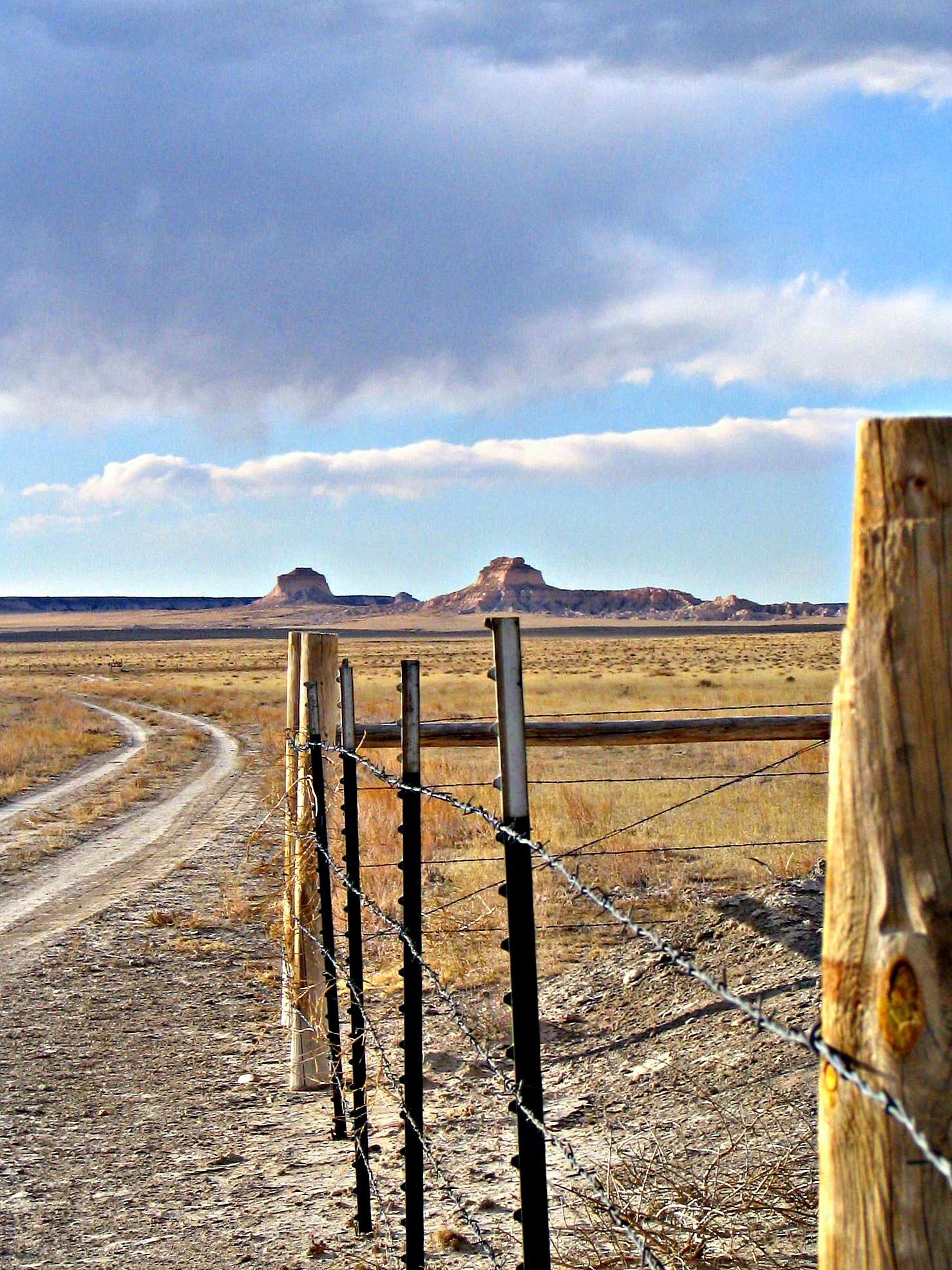
The Pawnee Butte, home of the Pawnee tribe who worshiped Atira.

Atira (Pawnee: atíraʼ [ətíɾəʔ]), literally "our mother" or "Mother (vocative)", is the title of the earth goddess (among others) in the Native American Pawnee tribal culture.

She was the wife of Tirawa, the creator god. Her earthly manifestation is corn, which symbolizes the life that Mother Earth gives.

Atira holds a significant place in the spiritual beliefs of the Pawnees of North America, where she is revered as Earth Mother. Esteemed for her nurturing and protective qualities, Atira symbolizes the very essence of life that springs from the earth. The Pawnee people consciously chose to prioritize hunting over farming. They believed that the act of agriculture, particularly plowing, disrespected her sacred nature and disrupted the balance of the natural world. Instead, they honored Atira by living in harmony with the land, deriving their sustenance from the wild bounty of the fields and forests. Atira is considered the Sacred Mother of all life, with her influence most profoundly felt in the untouched landscapes that flourish with vitality and growth.

The goddess was revered in a ceremony called Hako. The ceremony used an ear of corn (maize) painted blue to represent the sky and white feathers attached to represent a cloud as a symbol of Atira.

Her daughter was Uti Hiata who taught the Pawnee people how to make tools and grow food.

== Legacy ==
- 163693 Atira, the first asteroid known to have an orbit entirely within that of Earth (and itself namesake of the class of Atira asteroids), is named for Atira.
- Atira Mons, a mountain on Venus, is named for Atira.
- Atira is included among the women listed in the Heritage Floor of Judy Chicago's The Dinner Party.
