= 2015 DR215 =

Near-Earth asteroid

2015 DR_{215}
Discovery
- Discovered by: Pan-STARRS 1
- Discovery site: Haleakalā Obs.
- Discovery date: 18 February 2015

Designations
- Minor planet category: NEO · Atira · PHA

Orbital characteristics
- Epoch 21 January 2022 (JD 2459600.5)
- Uncertainty parameter 0
- Observation arc: 7.12 yr (2,602 days)
- Aphelion: 0.9809 AU
- Perihelion: 0.3522 AU
- Semi-major axis: 0.6665 AU
- Eccentricity: 0.4716
- Orbital period (sidereal): 0.54 yr (199 days)
- Mean anomaly: 74.459°
- Mean motion: 1° 48^{m} 40.325^{s} / day
- Inclination: 4.085°
- Longitude of ascending node: 314.961°
- Argument of perihelion: 42.298°
- Earth MOID: 0.044412 AU (6,643,900 km)

Physical characteristics
- Mean diameter: 205 m
- Geometric albedo: 0.266
- Spectral type: Sr
- Absolute magnitude (H): 20.51

2015 DR_{215} is a stony near-Earth asteroid of the Atira class residing within Earth's orbit. It was discovered on 18 February 2015 by the Pan-STARRS 1 survey at Haleakalā Observatory at Maui, Hawaiʻi. The asteroid has a diameter of about 200 m (660 ft) and makes close approaches within 0.05 AU (7.5 million km; 4.6 million mi) of Earth, making it a potentially hazardous object. On 11 March 2022, it made a close approach 0.045 AU (6.7 million km; 4.2 million mi) from Earth, reaching a peak apparent magnitude of 17 as it streaked across the southern sky.

== Discovery ==
2015 DR_{215} was discovered on 18 February 2015 by the Pan-STARRS 1 survey at Haleakalā Observatory at Maui, Hawaiʻi. It was first observed at apparent magnitude 20.7, located in the southern sky 28 degrees below the ecliptic with an angular separation (solar elongation) of 76 degrees from the Sun. Follow-up observations from the Mauna Kea Observatory and Cerro Tololo Inter-American Observatory commenced, establishing an observation arc of 12 days until its discovery announcement by the Minor Planet Center on 2 March 2015.

On 5 March 2016, 2015 DR_{215} was recovered by the ESA Optical Ground Station at apparent magnitude 19, at solar elongations below 56 degrees. It was observed to be about 0.5 degrees away from its predicted positions in March 2016. The recovery observations significantly reduced the asteroid's orbital uncertainty, bringing its uncertainty parameter down from 9 to 3.

As of 2022, 2015 DR_{215} has been observed for over 7 years, with a well-determined orbit at an uncertainty parameter of 0.

== Classification ==
2015 DR_{215} is one of a small number of Atira class asteroids that are orbiting entirely within the Earth's orbit. The taxonomic class of 2015 DR_{215} in the Bus–DeMeo scheme is Sr, indicating a stony composition.

== Numbering and naming ==
As of 2023, this minor planet has neither been numbered nor named by the Minor Planet Center.
