= 2020 OV1 =

Near-Earth asteroid

2020 OV_{1}
Discovery
- Discovered by: Zwicky Transient Facility
- Discovery site: Palomar Obs.
- Discovery date: 19 July 2020 (first observed only)

Designations
- Minor planet category: NEO · Atira

Orbital characteristics
- Epoch 31 May 2020 (JD 2459000.5)
- Uncertainty parameter 7
- Observation arc: 18 days
- Aphelion: 0.79963 AU
- Perihelion: 0.4754 AU
- Semi-major axis: 0.63751 AU
- Eccentricity: 0.2543
- Orbital period (sidereal): 0.51 yr (271.4 d)
- Mean anomaly: 185.9°
- Mean motion: 1° 56^{m} 10.68^{s} / day
- Inclination: 32.58°
- Longitude of ascending node: 296.02°
- Argument of perihelion: 189.821°
- Earth MOID: 0.21933 AU

Physical characteristics
- Mean diameter: 200–600 m (est. at 0.05–0.15)
- Absolute magnitude (H): 18.7±0.6

2020 OV_{1} is a near-Earth object of the Atira group. It was discovered at r=20.2 mag on 2020 July 19 by the Zwicky Transient Facility using the 1.2-m f/2.4 Schmidt. As of 2023, this minor planet has neither been numbered nor named by the Minor Planet Center.

2020 OV_{1} orbits the Sun at a distance of 0.5–0.8 AU once every 6 months (186 days; semi-major axis of 0.64 AU). Its orbit has an eccentricity of 0.25 and a relatively high inclination of 33° with respect to the ecliptic. The orbital evolution of 2020 OV_{1} indicates that it is comfortably entrenched within the Atira orbital realm, but it might have arrived there relatively recently.
