= 2023 WK3 =

Near-Earth object of the Atira group

2023 WK_{3}
Discovery
- Discovered by: Grzegorz Duszanowicz
- Discovery site: Moonbase South Observatory, Hakos
- Discovery date: 21 November 2023 (first observed only)

Designations
- Minor planet category: NEO · Atira

Orbital characteristics
- Epoch 13 September 2023 (JD 2460200.5)
- Uncertainty parameter 7
- Observation arc: 22 days
- Aphelion: 0.9660 AU
- Perihelion: 0.3221 AU
- Semi-major axis: 0.64407 AU
- Eccentricity: 0.4999
- Orbital period (sidereal): 0.5169 yr (188.80 d)
- Mean anomaly: 47.94°
- Mean motion: 1° 54^{m} 24.48^{s} / day
- Inclination: 24.49°
- Longitude of ascending node: 235.061°
- Argument of perihelion: 11.117°
- Earth MOID: 0.0376212 AU

Physical characteristics
- Mean diameter: 450–550 m (est. at 0.05–0.15)
- Absolute magnitude (H): 20.5±0.4

2023 WK_{3} is a near-Earth object of the Atira group.

== Discovery ==
2023 WK_{3} was discovered at G=19.5 mag on 2023 November 21 by G. Duszanowicz using the 0.28-m f/1.9 reflector + CMOS camera of the Moonbase South Observatory, Hakos. MPC code L87

== Orbit and classification ==
It orbits the Sun at a distance of 0.32–0.97 AU once every 6 months (189 days; semi-major axis of 0.64 AU). Its orbit has an eccentricity of 0.5 and a somewhat high inclination of 24° with respect to the ecliptic. It could be a fragment or a former moon of a larger present-day Atira.

== Numbering and naming ==
As of 2023, this minor planet has neither been numbered nor named by the Minor Planet Center.
