= John H. Tice =

American forecaster and educator (1809–1883)

John Hower Tice, known as John H. Tice, (1809–1883) was an American weather forecaster, educator, and writer.

== Professional life ==
=== Weather ===
Tice was "a student of the phenomena of cyclones, and promulgated the theory that they were entirely different from disturbances in nature known as hurricanes." He claimed to base his predictions on the movements of the planet Mercury and the hypothetical planet of Vulcan.

He was known for visiting the sites of severe storms "anywhere in reach from St. Louis."

At the famous cyclone which destroyed the town of Marshfield in the early 80s, he . . . moved among the ruins, recording everything, from the direction and power of the tornado shown by the houses and trees it had twisted to splinters, to chickens which were exhibited to him as having been stripped of their feathers while being carried in the "suck" of the cyclone.

He published a weather almanac beginning about 1875; it had a wide circulation, especially among farmers.

He visited professional publishers in an attempt to have them handle a book called Elements of Meteorology, Part One. When they rejected it, he self-published Elements of Meteorology, Part Second, Meteorological Cycles.

It was said that Tice was a "local celebrity" because he "made prophecy of the weather his specialty, and announced his determination to reduce it to a scientific basis." He was also noted for "his earnestness, his carelessness in dress and his accessibility to every one who could ask or answer a question."

His general idea was that he could determine mathematically and with scientific accuracy the relations of every planet, including the earth, to every other and to the sun, and to calculate the relations of all these to periodicity in storms, earthquakes, the changes of season . . . . His reward in his own generation, however, was almost necessarily the reputation of being "queer," or, as it was sometimes expressed, a "little off."

=== Other ===
Tice was principal of Laclede School and also secretary of the St. Louis public-school system from 1849 to 1854 and was superintendent pro tem from 1851 to 1852. He was elected superintendent from 1854 to 1857 and was credited with first suggesting that evening schools be established in the city.

For a time he edited a St. Louis newspaper called The Missourian, where he was known as "Old Probs" and, according to a fellow journalist, "was always dreaming about the weather and watching the planets." After his time as editor of The Missourian, he was editor of the newspaper The Democrat and was called "The Sage of Cheltenham" for his ability to predict the weather, and his self-education and mastery of Euclid, Algebra, history and Entomology, as well as being fluent in German, Spanish and French languages, and the ability to read Greek and Latin.

== Personal life ==
Tice was born in 1809 near Hagerstown, Maryland, and was educated in Fredericksburg, Maryland. He moved to St. Louis, Missouri, in 1840. He lived in the Cheltenham neighborhood.

He died of "senile debility, with congestion of lungs" on November 30, 1883, in Callaway, Missouri. He predeceased his wife, Marion, and was survived by three daughters and one son. He was buried in Bellefontaine Cemetery, St. Louis.

== Additional reading ==
- "In Silver Land: Professor Tice Describes the Scenery of Colorado," St. Louis Globe-Democrat, August 21, 1878, image 7
- "An Invocation," St. Louis Daily Globe-Democrat, July 4, 1875, image 4 Verse mocking "Professor Tice! Professor Tice! How can you treat us so?"
- News articles, Marshfield, Missouri, April 1880, Levelled by Tornado
