= 2025 SC79 =

Second object orbiting the Sun entirely within Venus's orbit

2025 SC_{79}
Discovery
- Discovered by: Scott S. Sheppard
- Discovery site: Cerro Tololo Inter-American Observatory
- Discovery date: 27 September 2025

Designations
- Alternative names: v27sep5
- Minor planet category: NEO • Atira asteroid

Orbital characteristics
- Uncertainty parameter 8
- Semi-major axis: 0.4957697 AU
- Eccentricity: 0.4499108
- Orbital period (sidereal): 128 days (0.35 years)
- Mean anomaly: 342.29421°
- Mean motion: 2.82347600°/day
- Inclination: 16.78228°
- Earth MOID: 0.29249
- Mercury MOID: 0.08312
- Venus MOID: 0.0146

Physical characteristics
- Mean diameter: 700 m
- Absolute magnitude (H): 18.83

2025 SC_{79} is a near-Earth asteroid discovered by the Cerro Tololo-DECam on 27 September 2025. With an orbital period of 128 days, 2025 SC_{79} has the third-shortest period of all known asteroids as of 2025, after 2021 PH27 and 2025 GN1 (which orbit the Sun in 113 days). It belongs to the Atira group of asteroids which reside inside the orbit of Earth. 2025 SC_{79} is estimated to be 700 metres (2,300 ft) in diameter.
