= Claudius Herrick =

American educator and minister

Claudius Herrick (February 21, 1775 – May 26, 1831) was an American educator and minister.

He was born in Southampton, New York. Herrick graduated from Yale College in 1798 and became the second head of Deerfield Academy. He was ordained to the ministry of the Congregational Church, becoming a pastor in Woodbridge, Connecticut in 1802. That year, he also married Hannah Pierpont.

In 1807, he left the pastorate because of ill health. He moved to New Haven, Connecticut and in 1808 started a school for young women there. Many of his students were the daughters of clergymen, who received half-price tuition. Three Episcopal bishops and a Connecticut governor, Roger Sherman Baldwin, were married to former students of the school.

He was the father of scientist Edward Claudius Herrick.

Herrick died of typhus in 1831.
