= Edward Claudius Herrick =

American librarian and entomologist

Edward C. Herrick
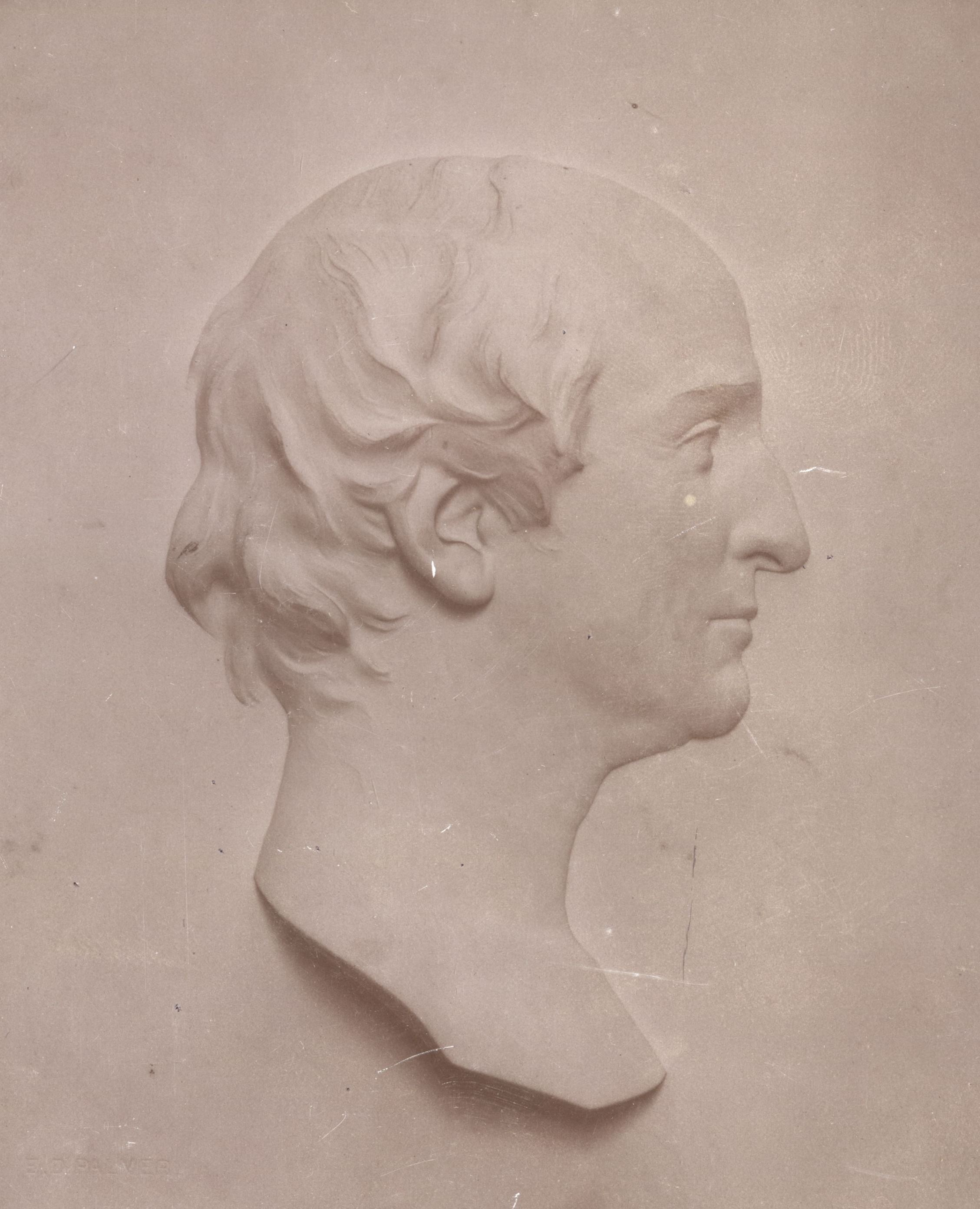
- Bas relief of Herrick, created by Erastus D. Palmer
- Born: February 24, 1811; New Haven, Connecticut
- Died: June 11, 1862 (aged 51); New Haven, Connecticut
- Occupations: Librarian (Yale), entomologist

Edward Claudius Herrick (February 24, 1811 – June 11, 1862) was an American librarian and scientist. He was the first full-time librarian at Yale University.

== Early life and education ==
He was the youngest child of Rev. Claudius Herrick, a much respected teacher in New Haven, Connecticut, and Hannah (Pierpont) Herrick. He was born in New Haven, on what is now a part of the Yale College square. After a good preliminary education, of which the College course did not form a part, he was Engaged as a clerk in the well known book-store of Gen. Hezekiah Howe, where excellent opportunities were afforded him to gratify his early thirst for knowledge. For a short time, he was in business as a bookseller on his own account.

== Career at Yale ==
His official connection with the College commenced in 1843. As the Yale University Library was about to be removed to a new edifice, he was appointed Librarian, and he continued to discharge the duties of that office fifteen years, till his resignation in 1858. In 1852 he was also appointed Treasurer of Yale College, and he held that post until his death. His services to the College, however, were by no means confined to his official trusts; but he labored for its interests in every way which his versatile industry could suggest.

Since the death of Professor James Luce Kingsley, he edited the Yale Triennial Catalogue, and prepared the annual record of the deceased graduates of the College. He also made extensive researches respecting the history of the College, and collected much information respecting the biographies of the early graduates. His public spirit led him to perform many important labors for the town of New Haven, among which, his care for the public records, and his supervision of the Cemetery, are most note-worthy Notwithstanding his life of incessant business, he made high attainments in various departments of science. Entomology was one of his favorite studies, and although he published comparatively little, his acquaintance with the literature of the subject was extensive, and his original investigations were valuable. He was enthusiastically devoted to Astronomy and Meteorology.

From an early period in his life, he was an observer of the heavens, and an accurate recorder of his observations. He rendered important services in determining the periodicity of meteoric showers, and discovered by his own researches the return of the August Perseids. He took great pains to collect information respecting the paths of remarkable meteors of which he heard, and to look up historical notices of those of earlier years. He likewise paid special attention to the recurrence of the Aurora Borealis, keeping for several years an accurate daily register of the appearance or non-appearance of that phenomenon. Numerous articles from his pen, on all these topics, are to be found in the American Journal of Science. He received, but did not accept, an appointment as a member of the United States Exploring Expedition, under Capt Charles Wilkes.

In the local history of the college, the town and the state, in American biography, in general literature, especially in quaint and entertaining lore, in English etymology, and in bibliography, his attainments were great, and his knowledge was always at command. He was constantly referred to as an adviser and a critic, not only by his neighbors and College associates, but by those at a distance who knew his reputation. It is believed that the time and pains which he expended in these indirect contributions to literature and science, would, if otherwise employed, have given him wide distinction in the world of letters.

== Death ==
After a brief illness, he died. He was never married, but kept house in New Haven for his mother, to whom he was affectionately devoted, until her death in 1859. He died at his residence in New Haven, June 11, 1862, aged 51 years.

== Notes ==
- This article incorporates public domain material from the Yale Obituary Record.
