= Orgères-en-Beauce =

- Commune
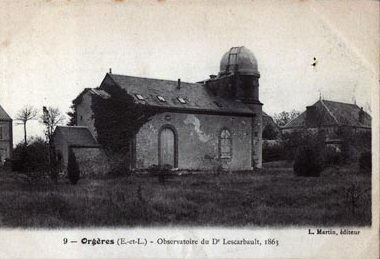
- The Lescarbault observatory in Orgères

- Coat of arms
- Location of Orgères-en-Beauce
- Location within France Location within Centre-Val de Loire
- Coordinates: 48°08′48″N 1°41′10″E
- Country: France
- Region: Centre-Val de Loire
- Department: Eure-et-Loir
- Arrondissement: Châteaudun
- Canton: Les Villages Vovéens

Government
  - Mayor (2020–2026): Gilles Crosnier
- Area^{1}: 15.24 km^{2} (5.88 sq mi)
- Elevation: 132 m (433 ft)
- Highest elevation: 139 m (456 ft)
- Lowest elevation: 117 m (384 ft)
- Population (2023): 1,007
  - Density: 66.08/km^{2} (171.1/sq mi)
- Time zone: UTC+01:00 (CET)
  - Summer (DST): UTC+02:00 (CEST)
- INSEE/Postal code: 28287 /28140
- ^{1} French Land Register data, which excludes lakes, ponds, glaciers > 1 km^{2} (0.386 sq mi or 247 acres) and river estuaries.

Orgères-en-Beauce (French pronunciation: [ɔʁʒɛʁ ɑ̃ bos], literally Orgères in Beauce) is a commune in the Eure-et-Loir department in northern France.

== Population ==
Historical population
| Year | Pop. | ±% p.a. |
|---|---|---|
| 1968 | 856 | — |
| 1975 | 987 | +2.06% |
| 1982 | 1,052 | +0.92% |
| 1990 | 1,054 | +0.02% |
| 1999 | 1,024 | −0.32% |
| 2007 | 1,089 | +0.77% |
| 2012 | 1,108 | +0.35% |
| 2017 | 1,061 | −0.86% |
| 2023 | 1,007 | −0.87% |
Source: INSEE

== See also ==
- Communes of the Eure-et-Loir department
