= Atira asteroid =

Group of near-Earth asteroids

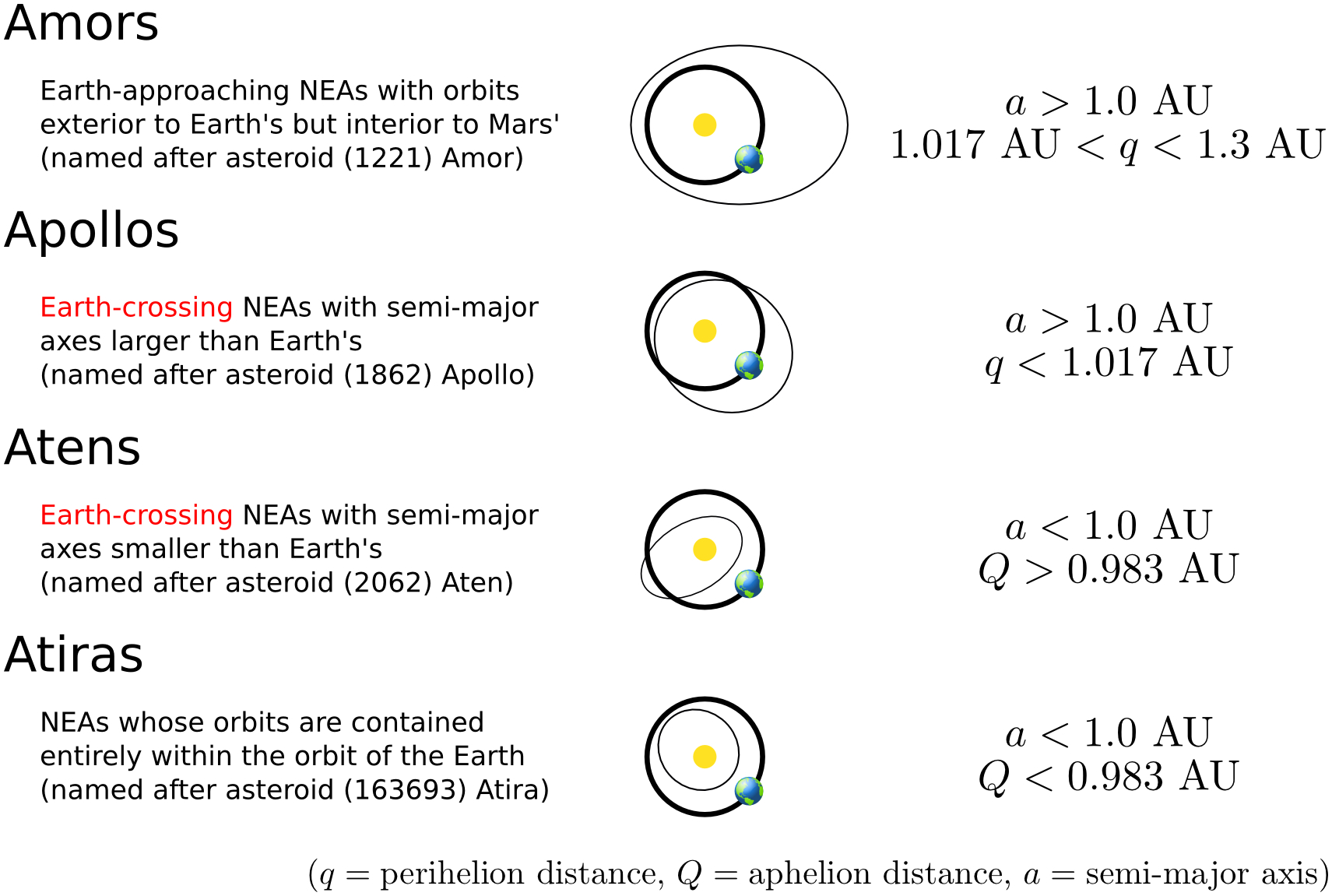
Common orbital subgroups of Near-Earth Objects (NEOs)

Atira asteroids /əˈtɪrə/ or Apohele asteroids, also known as interior-Earth objects (IEOs), are Near-Earth objects whose orbits are entirely confined within Earth's orbit; that is, their orbit has an aphelion (farthest point from the Sun) smaller than Earth's perihelion (nearest point to the Sun), which is 0.983 astronomical units (AU). Atira asteroids are by far the least numerous group of near-Earth objects, compared to the more populous Aten, Apollo and Amor asteroids.

== History ==
=== Naming ===
Atira asteroids are the most recently discovered group of near-Earth objects. The first Atira asteroid detected was 1998 DK36 in 1998, and at that time, its discoverers proposed the name "Apohele" to refer to this group of asteroids, after the Hawaiian word for orbit, from apo [ˈɐpo] 'circle' and hele [ˈhɛlɛ] 'to go'. This was suggested partly because of its similarity to the words aphelion (apoapsis) and helios. (Note: Cambridge Conference Correspondence, (2): WHAT'S IN A NAME: APOHELE = APOAPSIS & HELIOS – from Dave Tholen, Cambridge Conference Network (CCNet) DIGEST, 9 July 1998 Benny, Duncan Steel has already brought up the subject of a class name for objects with orbits interior to the Earth's. To be sure, we've already given that subject some thought. I also wanted a word that begins with the letter "A", but there was some desire to work Hawaiian culture into it. I consulted with a friend of mine that has a master's degree in the Hawaiian language, and she recommended "Apohele", the Hawaiian word for "orbit". I found that an interesting suggestion, because of the similarity to fragments of "apoapsis" and "helios", and these objects would have their apoapsis closer to the Sun than the Earth's orbit. By the way, the pronunciation would be like "ah-poe-hey-lay". Rob Whiteley has suggested "Aliʻi", which refers to the Hawaiian elite, which provides a rich bank of names for discoveries in this class, such as Kuhio, Kalakaua, Kamehameha, Liliuokalani, and so on. Unfortunately, I think the okina (the reverse apostrophe) would be badly treated by most people. I wasn't planning to bring it up at this stage, but because Duncan has already done so, here's what we've got on the table so far. I'd appreciate some feedback on the suggestions. --Dave) Other authors adopted the designation "Inner Earth Objects" (IEOs). But 1998 DK36 was considered a lost minor planet. Therefore, it has a claim to title "first Apohele detected" but not "first Apohele confirmed", which goes to 163693 Atira. Following the general practice to name a new class of asteroids for the first confirmed member of that class, which in this case was 163693 Atira, the designation of "Atira asteroids" was largely adopted by the scientific community, including by NASA, by 2010.

=== Discovery and observation ===
Their location inside the Earth's orbit makes Atiras very difficult to observe, as from Earth's perspective they are close to the Sun and therefore 'drowned out' by the Sun's overpowering light. This means that Atiras can usually only be seen during twilight. The first documented twilight searches for asteroids inside Earth's orbit were performed by astronomer Robert Trumpler over the early 20th century, but he failed to find any.

The first confirmed Atira asteroid was 163693 Atira in 2003, discovered by the Lincoln Laboratory Near Earth Asteroid Research Team. As of January 2025, there are 34 known Atiras, two of which are named, nine of which have received a numbered designation, and seven of which are potentially hazardous objects.

== Origins ==
Most Atira asteroids originated in the asteroid belt and were driven to their current locations as a result of gravitational perturbation, as well as other causes such as the Yarkovsky effect. A number of known Atiras could be fragments or former moons of larger Atiras as they exhibit an unusually high level of orbital correlation.

== Orbits ==
Atiras do not cross Earth's orbit and are not immediate impact event threats, but their orbits may be perturbed outward by a close approach to either Mercury or Venus and become Earth-crossing asteroids in the future. The dynamics of many Atira asteroids resemble the one induced by the Kozai-Lidov mechanism, (Note: Namely, they have coupled oscillations in orbital eccentricity and inclination) which contributes to enhanced long-term orbital stability, since there is no libration of the perihelion.

== Exploration ==
A 2017 study published in the journal Advances in Space Research proposed a low-cost space probe be sent to study Atira asteroids, citing the difficulty in observing the group from Earth as a reason to undertake the mission. The study proposed that the mission would be powered by spacecraft electric propulsion and would follow a path designed to flyby as many Atira asteroids as possible. The probe would also attempt to discover new NEOs that may pose a threat to Earth.

== Related asteroid groups ==
=== ꞌAylóꞌchaxnim asteroids ===
ꞌAylóꞌchaxnim asteroids, which had been provisionally nicknamed "Vatira" asteroids before the first was discovered, (Note: The nickname "Vatira" combined "Venus" with "Atira".) are a subclass of Atiras that orbit entirely interior to the orbit of Venus, a.k.a. 0.718 AU. Despite their orbits placing them at a significant distance from Earth, they are still classified as near-Earth objects. Observations suggest that ꞌAylóꞌchaxnim asteroids frequently have their orbits altered into Atira asteroids and vice versa.

First formally theorised to exist by William F. Bottke and Gianluca Masi in 2002 and 2003, the first and to date only such asteroid found is 594913 ꞌAylóꞌchaxnim, which was discovered on 4 January 2020 by the Zwicky Transient Facility. As the archetype, it subsequently gave its name to the class. It has an aphelion of only 0.656 AU, the smallest of any known asteroid.

=== Vulcanoids ===
No asteroids have yet been discovered to orbit entirely inside the orbit of Mercury (q = 0.307 AU). Such hypothetical asteroids would likely be termed vulcanoids, although the term often refers to asteroids which more specifically have remained in the intra-Mercurian region over the age of the Solar System.

== Members ==
The following table lists the known and suspected Atiras as of November 2025. 594913 ꞌAylóꞌchaxnim, due to its unique classification, has been highlighted in pink. The interior planets Mercury and Venus have been included for comparison as grey rows.

List of known and suspected Atiras as of October 2025 (Q < 0.983 AU)
Designation	Perihelion (AU)	Semi-major axis (AU)	Aphelion (AU)	Eccentricity	Inclination (°)	Period (days)	Observation arc (days)	(H)	Diameter^{(A)} (m)	Discoverer	Ref
Mercury (for comparison)	0.307	0.3871	0.467	0.2056	7.01	88	NA	−0.6	4,879,400	NA	
Venus (for comparison)	0.718	0.7233	0.728	0.0068	3.39	225	NA	−4.5	12,103,600	NA	
1998 DK36	0.404	0.6923	0.980	0.4160	2.02	210	1	25.0	35	David J. Tholen	MPC · JPL
163693 Atira	0.502	0.7410	0.980	0.3221	25.62	233	7766	16.4	4800±500^{(B)}	LINEAR	List; MPC · JPL
(164294) 2004 XZ_{130}	0.337	0.6176	0.898	0.4545	2.95	177	3564	20.5	290	David J. Tholen	List; MPC · JPL
(434326) 2004 JG6	0.298	0.6352	0.973	0.5311	18.94	185	6227	18.5	710	LONEOS	List; MPC · JPL
(413563) 2005 TG_{45}	0.428	0.6813	0.935	0.3723	23.33	205	7031	17.6	1,100	Catalina Sky Survey	List; MPC · JPL
2013 JX28 (a.k.a. 2006 KZ39)	0.262	0.6008	0.940	0.5641	10.76	170	5110	20.1	340	Mount Lemmon Survey; Pan-STARRS	MPC · JPL
(613676) 2006 WE_{4}	0.641	0.7848	0.928	0.1829	24.77	254	4995	18.9	590	Mount Lemmon Survey	List; MPC · JPL
(418265) 2008 EA_{32}	0.428	0.6159	0.804	0.3050	28.26	177	5816	16.5	1,800	Catalina Sky Survey	List; MPC · JPL
(481817) 2008 UL_{90}	0.431	0.6950	0.959	0.3799	24.31	212	5537	18.6	680	Mount Lemmon Survey	List; MPC · JPL
2010 XB_{11}	0.288	0.6181	0.948	0.5338	29.88	178	5183	19.7	410	Mount Lemmon Survey	MPC · JPL
2012 VE_{46}	0.455	0.7131	0.971	0.3612	6.67	220	2225	20.2	320	Pan-STARRS	MPC · JPL
2013 JX_{28}	0.262	0.6008	0.940	0.5642	10.77	170	5110	20.1	340	Mount Lemmon Survey	MPC · JPL
2013 TQ_{5}	0.653	0.7737	0.894	0.1557	16.40	249	4031	19.9	380	Mount Lemmon Survey	MPC · JPL
2014 FO_{47}	0.548	0.7522	0.956	0.2711	19.20	238	3259	20.2	320	Mount Lemmon Survey	MPC · JPL
2015 DR215	0.352	0.6666	0.981	0.4715	4.06	199	2602	20.5	280	Pan-STARRS	MPC · JPL
2017 XA_{1}	0.646	0.8094	0.973	0.2016	17.18	266	1084	21.3	200	Pan-STARRS	MPC · JPL
(678861) 2017 YH (a.k.a. 2016 XJ_{24})	0.329	0.6346	0.941	0.4823	19.85	185	2980	18.1	840	Spacewatch; ATLAS	MPC · JPL
2018 JB_{3}	0.485	0.6832	0.882	0.2904	40.39	206	3321	17.7	1,020	Catalina Sky Survey	MPC · JPL
2019 AQ3	0.404	0.5886	0.774	0.3143	47.22	165	2996	17.5	1,120	Zwicky Transient Facility	MPC · JPL
2019 LF6	0.317	0.5554	0.794	0.4293	29.50	151	1108	17.3	1,230	Zwicky Transient Facility	MPC · JPL
594913 ꞌAylóꞌchaxnim	0.457	0.5553	0.654	0.1772	15.87	151	1827	16.2	1,700	Zwicky Transient Facility	MPC · JPL
2020 HA10	0.692	0.8197	0.947	0.1553	49.65	271	4043	19.0	560	Mount Lemmon Survey	MPC · JPL
2020 OV1	0.476	0.6376	0.800	0.2541	32.58	186	1179	18.7	640	Zwicky Transient Facility	MPC · JPL
2021 BS_{1}	0.396	0.5984	0.800	0.3376	31.73	169	1564	18.6	670	Zwicky Transient Facility	MPC · JPL
2021 LJ_{4}	0.418	0.6764	0.935	0.3820	9.82	203	2860	20.1	340	Scott S. Sheppard	MPC · JPL
2021 PB_{2}	0.610	0.7174	0.825	0.1500	24.83	222	4448	18.8	610	Zwicky Transient Facility	MPC · JPL
2021 PH27	0.133	0.4618	0.790	0.7115	31.94	115	2552	17.7	1,020	Scott S. Sheppard	MPC · JPL
2021 VR_{3}	0.313	0.5339	0.755	0.4139	18.07	143	1716	18.0	890	Zwicky Transient Facility	MPC · JPL
2022 BJ_{8}	0.590	0.7853	0.981	0.2487	15.83	254	816	19.4	470	Kitt Peak-Bok	MPC · JPL
2023 EL	0.581	0.7714	0.961	0.2462	13.88	247	2864	19.2	520	Scott S. Sheppard	MPC · JPL
2023 EY_{2}	0.398	0.6036	0.809	0.3398	35.47	171	325	19.8	400	Kitt Peak-Bok	MPC · JPL
2023 KQ_{5}	0.805	0.8722	0.939	0.0771	67.43	298	3318	18.8	630	Pan-STARRS	MPC · JPL
2023 EY_{2}	0.398	0.6033	0.809	0.3978	35.55	171	6	19.9	370	Kitt Peak-Bok	MPC · JPL
2023 WK3	0.322	0.6442	0.966	0.4998	24.47	189	3606	20.5	290	Moonbase South Observatory	MPC · JPL
2024 UM_{9}	0.803	0.8609	0.919	0.0672	21.17	292	1753	20.6	260	Mount Lemmon Survey	MPC · JPL
2024 WD_{19}	0.572	0.6795	0.787	0.1579	3.79	205	32	21.3	190	Subaru Telescope, Maunakea	MPC · JPL
2025 GN1	0.136	0.4620	0.788	0.7051	32.84	115	88	20.1	350	Cerro Tololo-DECam	MPC · JPL
2025 LP	0.623	0.7437	0.864	0.1624	33.34	234	110	19.6	430	Cerro Tololo-DECam	MPC · JPL
2025 SC79	0.273	0.4958	0.719	0.4499	16.77	128	10	18.8	620	Cerro Tololo-DECam	MPC · JPL

^{(A)} All diameter estimates are based on an assumed albedo of 0.14 (except 163693 Atira, for which the size has been directly measured; and 594913 ꞌAylóꞌchaxnim, for which an albedo of 0.22 is assumed based on its known stony composition)
^{(B)} Binary asteroid

== See also ==
- List of minor planet groups
- List of minor planets
- List of Mercury-crossing minor planets
