= 163693 Atira =

Asteroid

- Discovery images of Atira's satellite, taken at Arecibo on 20 January 2017

Discovery
- Discovered by: LINEAR
- Discovery site: Lincoln Lab ETS
- Discovery date: 11 February 2003

Designations
- Pronunciation: /əˈtɪrə/ Pawnee: [ətíɾəʔ]
- Named after: Atíraʼ "my/our mother" (Pawnee epithet of the earth goddess)
- Alternative designations: 2003 CP_{20}
- Minor planet category: NEO; Atira; Venus-crosser

Orbital characteristics
- Epoch 23 March 2018 (JD 2458200.5)
- Uncertainty parameter 0
- Observation arc: 14.21 yr (5,192 d)
- Aphelion: 0.9798 AU
- Perihelion: 0.5024 AU
- Semi-major axis: 0.7411 AU
- Eccentricity: 0.3221
- Orbital period (sidereal): 233 days
- Mean anomaly: 30.769°
- Mean motion: 1° 32^{m} 41.64^{s} / day
- Inclination: 25.618°
- Longitude of ascending node: 103.90°
- Argument of perihelion: 252.93°
- Known satellites: 1: D: 1.0±0.3 km; P: 15.5 h; Type: synchronous
- Earth MOID: 0.2076 AU (80.88 LD)

Physical characteristics
- Mean diameter: 4.8±0.5 km
- Synodic rotation period: 3.3984±0.0006 h
- Pole ecliptic longitude: 192°
- Pole ecliptic latitude: −50°
- Geometric albedo: 0.0231 (derived)
- Spectral type: S (assumed)
- Absolute magnitude (H): 16.3

163693 Atira (/əˈtɪrə/; provisional designation 2003 CP_{20}) is a stony asteroid, dwelling in the interior of Earth's orbit. It is classified as a near-Earth object. Atira is a binary asteroid, a system of two asteroids orbiting their common barycenter. The primary component with a diameter of approximately 4.8 kilometers (3 miles) is orbited by a minor-planet moon that measures about 1 km (0.6 mi). Atira was discovered on 11 February 2003, by astronomers with the Lincoln Near-Earth Asteroid Research at Lincoln Laboratory's Experimental Test Site near Socorro, New Mexico, in the United States. To date, it is the only confirmed binary asteroid that orbits inside Earth's orbit.

It is the namesake and the first numbered body of the Atira asteroids, a new subclass of near-Earth asteroids, which have their orbits entirely within that of Earth and are therefore alternatively called Interior-Earth Objects (IEO). As of 2019, there are only 36 known members of the Atira group of asteroids. Atiras are similar to the larger group of Aten asteroids, as both are near-Earth objects and both have a semi-major axis smaller than that of Earth (< 1.0 AU). However, and contrary to Aten asteroids, the aphelion for Atiras is always smaller than Earth's perihelion (< 0.983 AU), which means that they do not approach Earth as close as Atens do in general. Atira has an Earth minimum orbit intersection distance of 0.2059 AU (30,800,000 km) or approximately 80.1 lunar distances.

== Physical properties ==
Atira is a S-type asteroid and orbits the Sun at a distance of 0.5–1.0 AU once every 8 months (233 days). Its orbit has an eccentricity of 0.32 and an inclination of 26° with respect to the ecliptic. With a perihelion of 0.50 AU the body also classifies as a Venus-crosser – as Venus orbits the Sun at a distance of 0.72–0.73 AU – but does not get as close to the Sun as Mercury (which orbits between 0.31 and 0.47 AU). As no precoveries were found, Atira's observation arc begins with its discovery observation in 2003. It has a rotation period of 3.3984 hours with a brightness variation of 0.36 magnitude (U=2) and a very low albedo of 0.0231.

With a diameter of 4.8 kilometers, Atira is one of the largest near-Earth objects. Early estimates of its size ranged from 1 to 2 kilometers, but those were based on an assumed higher albedo of 0.20. Its larger size and low albedo were discovered when Atira was imaged by radar in early 2017. These radar images also revealed that Atira is a binary asteroid.

== Binary system ==
Arecibo follow-up observations from 23 January 2017

Atira came within 0.207 AU (31,000,000 km) from Earth in January 2017, the closest since its discovery in 2003. This provided an opportunity to study the asteroid by radar. Images taken at Arecibo Observatory on 20 January 2017 revealed that Atira is a synchronous binary asteroid with a minor-planet moon. The primary with a diameter of 4.8±0.5 km is possibly elongated and very angular in shape. The secondary is tidally locked and has a diameter of 1.0±0.3 km. Additional images taken on 23 January 2017 showed that the two components are orbiting each other at a distance of about 6 km with an orbital period of 15.5 hours. It is currently the only confirmed binary asteroid that orbits inside Earth's orbit.

== Name ==
Because the first known object in a new class of asteroids will become the name of the new class, due consideration was given to the name for (163693). The other classes of near-Earth asteroids, Amors, Apollos, and Atens, are named after a Roman, Greek, and Egyptian god respectively, each of which begins with the letter 'A'. Atira follows this pattern, being named after Atíraʼ [Pawnee pronunciation: [ətíɾəʔ]], an epithet of the Earth goddess of the Pawnee people. Atíraʼ is the wife of the creator god, Tirawa, and goddess of Earth and the evening star. The official naming citation was published by the Minor Planet Center on 22 January 2008 (M.P.C. 61768).

== See also ==
- 594913 ꞌAylóꞌchaxnim (the first-known asteroid always inside Venus' orbit)
