= List of minor planets: 788001–789000 =

The following is a partial list of minor planets, running from minor-planet number 788001 through 789000, inclusive. The primary data for this and other partial lists is based on JPL's "Small-Body Orbital Elements" and data available from the Minor Planet Center. Critical list information is also provided by the MPC, unless otherwise specified from Lowell Observatory. A detailed description of the table's columns and additional sources are given on the main page including a complete list of every page in this series, and a statistical break-up on the dynamical classification of minor planets.

Also see the summary list of all named bodies in numerical and alphabetical order, and the corresponding naming citations for the number range of this particular list. New namings may only be added to this list after official publication, as the preannouncement of names is condemned by the Working Group for Small Bodies Nomenclature of the International Astronomical Union.

Near-Earth obj.	MBA (inner)	MBA (outer)	Centaur
Mars-crosser	MBA (middle)	Jupiter trojan	Trans-Neptunian obj.
Unclassified

== 788001–788100 ==
Designation			Discovery			Properties		Ref
Permanent	Provisional	Named after	Date	Site	Discoverer(s)	Category	Diam.	Ref
788001	2016 NQ_{173}	—	July 11, 2016	Haleakala	Pan-STARRS 1	·	2.2 km	MPC · JPL
788002	2016 NM_{174}	—	July 9, 2016	Haleakala	Pan-STARRS 1	·	1.9 km	MPC · JPL
788003	2016 NX_{174}	—	July 14, 2016	Haleakala	Pan-STARRS 1	·	2.2 km	MPC · JPL
788004	2016 NL_{175}	—	July 12, 2016	Haleakala	Pan-STARRS 1	·	1.3 km	MPC · JPL
788005	2016 NN_{175}	—	July 3, 2016	Mount Lemmon	Mount Lemmon Survey	AEG	2.2 km	MPC · JPL
788006	2016 NP_{175}	—	July 4, 2016	Haleakala	Pan-STARRS 1	·	1.8 km	MPC · JPL
788007	2016 NR_{175}	—	July 11, 2016	Haleakala	Pan-STARRS 1	VER	2.0 km	MPC · JPL
788008	2016 NX_{176}	—	September 24, 2011	Haleakala	Pan-STARRS 1	·	2.3 km	MPC · JPL
788009	2016 NM_{179}	—	July 12, 2016	Haleakala	Pan-STARRS 1	·	1.3 km	MPC · JPL
788010	2016 OX_{8}	—	July 31, 2016	Haleakala	Pan-STARRS 1	·	2.5 km	MPC · JPL
788011	2016 OC_{9}	—	July 28, 2016	Haleakala	Pan-STARRS 1	·	2.8 km	MPC · JPL
788012	2016 OF_{12}	—	July 30, 2016	Haleakala	Pan-STARRS 1	ADE	1.5 km	MPC · JPL
788013	2016 PO_{7}	—	August 2, 2016	Haleakala	Pan-STARRS 1	·	1.4 km	MPC · JPL
788014	2016 PS_{7}	—	September 29, 2011	Mount Lemmon	Mount Lemmon Survey	TIR	2.2 km	MPC · JPL
788015	2016 PY_{13}	—	April 17, 2015	Mount Lemmon	Mount Lemmon Survey	·	1.0 km	MPC · JPL
788016	2016 PB_{17}	—	August 27, 2006	Kitt Peak	Spacewatch	·	1.4 km	MPC · JPL
788017	2016 PO_{19}	—	August 7, 2016	Haleakala	Pan-STARRS 1	·	1.5 km	MPC · JPL
788018	2016 PD_{20}	—	March 22, 2015	Haleakala	Pan-STARRS 1	EOS	1.6 km	MPC · JPL
788019	2016 PM_{20}	—	September 5, 2000	Apache Point	SDSS	EOS	1.5 km	MPC · JPL
788020	2016 PU_{24}	—	March 22, 2015	Haleakala	Pan-STARRS 1	·	2.3 km	MPC · JPL
788021	2016 PD_{25}	—	October 24, 2011	Mount Lemmon	Mount Lemmon Survey	·	2.3 km	MPC · JPL
788022	2016 PO_{25}	—	July 5, 2016	Haleakala	Pan-STARRS 1	·	1.4 km	MPC · JPL
788023	2016 PC_{26}	—	October 19, 2011	Mount Lemmon	Mount Lemmon Survey	·	2.3 km	MPC · JPL
788024	2016 PM_{26}	—	April 10, 2015	Haleakala	Pan-STARRS 1	·	2.3 km	MPC · JPL
788025	2016 PR_{29}	—	August 6, 2016	Haleakala	Pan-STARRS 1	VER	1.8 km	MPC · JPL
788026	2016 PD_{30}	—	May 21, 2015	Haleakala	Pan-STARRS 1	·	2.1 km	MPC · JPL
788027	2016 PE_{30}	—	July 5, 2016	Haleakala	Pan-STARRS 1	·	1.5 km	MPC · JPL
788028	2016 PS_{30}	—	April 12, 2010	Mount Lemmon	Mount Lemmon Survey	·	2.0 km	MPC · JPL
788029	2016 PK_{35}	—	September 25, 2011	Haleakala	Pan-STARRS 1	·	2.2 km	MPC · JPL
788030	2016 PK_{36}	—	October 28, 2011	Mount Lemmon	Mount Lemmon Survey	·	2.0 km	MPC · JPL
788031	2016 PS_{36}	—	April 21, 2009	Kitt Peak	Spacewatch	·	2.2 km	MPC · JPL
788032	2016 PN_{48}	—	August 7, 2016	Haleakala	Pan-STARRS 1	·	1.5 km	MPC · JPL
788033	2016 PW_{51}	—	November 19, 2007	Mount Lemmon	Mount Lemmon Survey	·	2.1 km	MPC · JPL
788034	2016 PW_{53}	—	February 26, 2014	Haleakala	Pan-STARRS 1	·	2.3 km	MPC · JPL
788035	2016 PS_{54}	—	February 12, 2008	Mount Lemmon	Mount Lemmon Survey	·	2.2 km	MPC · JPL
788036	2016 PG_{55}	—	July 9, 2015	Haleakala	Pan-STARRS 1	·	3.0 km	MPC · JPL
788037	2016 PZ_{57}	—	May 19, 2015	Kitt Peak	Spacewatch	·	2.8 km	MPC · JPL
788038	2016 PD_{58}	—	August 7, 2016	Haleakala	Pan-STARRS 1	·	2.2 km	MPC · JPL
788039	2016 PN_{60}	—	August 7, 2016	Haleakala	Pan-STARRS 1	·	2.5 km	MPC · JPL
788040	2016 PB_{63}	—	July 4, 2016	Haleakala	Pan-STARRS 1	·	2.1 km	MPC · JPL
788041	2016 PR_{64}	—	August 9, 2016	Haleakala	Pan-STARRS 1	EOS	1.3 km	MPC · JPL
788042	2016 PX_{66}	—	August 10, 2016	Haleakala	Pan-STARRS 1	AMO	650 m	MPC · JPL
788043	2016 PJ_{70}	—	September 23, 2011	Kitt Peak	Spacewatch	·	2.3 km	MPC · JPL
788044	2016 PS_{71}	—	September 23, 2011	Haleakala	Pan-STARRS 1	·	2.2 km	MPC · JPL
788045	2016 PL_{72}	—	July 11, 2016	Haleakala	Pan-STARRS 1	·	1.6 km	MPC · JPL
788046	2016 PV_{72}	—	March 25, 2015	Haleakala	Pan-STARRS 1	·	840 m	MPC · JPL
788047	2016 PC_{88}	—	August 10, 2016	Haleakala	Pan-STARRS 1	·	1.5 km	MPC · JPL
788048	2016 PS_{88}	—	August 28, 2016	Mount Lemmon	Mount Lemmon Survey	·	2.2 km	MPC · JPL
788049	2016 PL_{89}	—	October 20, 2012	Mount Lemmon	Mount Lemmon Survey	·	1.2 km	MPC · JPL
788050	2016 PL_{90}	—	August 7, 2016	Haleakala	Pan-STARRS 1	VER	2.0 km	MPC · JPL
788051	2016 PV_{90}	—	August 2, 2016	Haleakala	Pan-STARRS 1	·	1.3 km	MPC · JPL
788052	2016 PG_{92}	—	August 8, 2016	Haleakala	Pan-STARRS 1	·	1.0 km	MPC · JPL
788053	2016 PE_{93}	—	November 8, 2007	Kitt Peak	Spacewatch	·	1.6 km	MPC · JPL
788054	2016 PP_{94}	—	October 8, 2007	Mount Lemmon	Mount Lemmon Survey	HOF	1.8 km	MPC · JPL
788055	2016 PX_{94}	—	August 2, 2016	Haleakala	Pan-STARRS 1	ELF	2.5 km	MPC · JPL
788056	2016 PR_{98}	—	July 28, 2011	Haleakala	Pan-STARRS 1	·	1.3 km	MPC · JPL
788057	2016 PZ_{98}	—	August 2, 2016	Haleakala	Pan-STARRS 1	·	1.9 km	MPC · JPL
788058	2016 PA_{102}	—	January 18, 2009	Mount Lemmon	Mount Lemmon Survey	·	1 km	MPC · JPL
788059	2016 PE_{103}	—	November 22, 2012	Kitt Peak	Spacewatch	·	1.3 km	MPC · JPL
788060	2016 PU_{105}	—	June 11, 2015	Haleakala	Pan-STARRS 1	·	2.6 km	MPC · JPL
788061	2016 PZ_{106}	—	September 22, 2011	Kitt Peak	Spacewatch	·	2.6 km	MPC · JPL
788062	2016 PN_{108}	—	September 26, 2011	Mount Lemmon	Mount Lemmon Survey	·	1.9 km	MPC · JPL
788063	2016 PE_{110}	—	August 2, 2016	Haleakala	Pan-STARRS 1	EOS	1.5 km	MPC · JPL
788064	2016 PJ_{113}	—	August 2, 2016	Haleakala	Pan-STARRS 1	·	1.3 km	MPC · JPL
788065	2016 PN_{115}	—	September 27, 2006	Kitt Peak	Spacewatch	·	1.3 km	MPC · JPL
788066	2016 PO_{117}	—	September 24, 2011	Haleakala	Pan-STARRS 1	·	2.1 km	MPC · JPL
788067	2016 PG_{119}	—	August 2, 2016	Haleakala	Pan-STARRS 1	·	2.3 km	MPC · JPL
788068	2016 PQ_{119}	—	August 7, 2016	Haleakala	Pan-STARRS 1	·	2.3 km	MPC · JPL
788069	2016 PV_{119}	—	September 24, 2011	Haleakala	Pan-STARRS 1	·	2.4 km	MPC · JPL
788070	2016 PG_{120}	—	August 7, 2016	Haleakala	Pan-STARRS 1	·	1.7 km	MPC · JPL
788071	2016 PF_{121}	—	August 8, 2016	Haleakala	Pan-STARRS 1	·	1.8 km	MPC · JPL
788072	2016 PT_{121}	—	August 9, 2016	Haleakala	Pan-STARRS 1	·	890 m	MPC · JPL
788073	2016 PB_{125}	—	September 19, 2011	Haleakala	Pan-STARRS 1	·	2.1 km	MPC · JPL
788074	2016 PY_{145}	—	August 2, 2016	Haleakala	Pan-STARRS 1	·	3.0 km	MPC · JPL
788075	2016 PF_{148}	—	August 3, 2016	Haleakala	Pan-STARRS 1	·	2.1 km	MPC · JPL
788076	2016 PV_{148}	—	July 30, 2016	Haleakala	Pan-STARRS 1	·	1.2 km	MPC · JPL
788077	2016 PW_{148}	—	August 2, 2016	Haleakala	Pan-STARRS 1	·	2.2 km	MPC · JPL
788078	2016 PG_{153}	—	August 1, 2016	Haleakala	Pan-STARRS 1	·	1.4 km	MPC · JPL
788079	2016 PJ_{153}	—	August 2, 2016	Haleakala	Pan-STARRS 1	·	2.2 km	MPC · JPL
788080	2016 PN_{153}	—	August 7, 2016	Haleakala	Pan-STARRS 1	·	1.9 km	MPC · JPL
788081	2016 PQ_{153}	—	August 14, 2016	Haleakala	Pan-STARRS 1	·	2.4 km	MPC · JPL
788082	2016 PE_{154}	—	August 1, 2016	Haleakala	Pan-STARRS 1	·	3.1 km	MPC · JPL
788083	2016 PF_{154}	—	August 14, 2016	Haleakala	Pan-STARRS 1	·	2.5 km	MPC · JPL
788084	2016 PP_{154}	—	August 7, 2016	Haleakala	Pan-STARRS 1	EUP	2.5 km	MPC · JPL
788085	2016 PO_{155}	—	June 11, 2015	Haleakala	Pan-STARRS 1	EOS	1.2 km	MPC · JPL
788086	2016 PX_{156}	—	August 2, 2016	Haleakala	Pan-STARRS 1	·	1.4 km	MPC · JPL
788087	2016 PJ_{157}	—	August 7, 2016	Haleakala	Pan-STARRS 1	·	2.1 km	MPC · JPL
788088	2016 PL_{157}	—	August 3, 2016	Haleakala	Pan-STARRS 1	·	1.7 km	MPC · JPL
788089	2016 PH_{158}	—	August 8, 2016	Haleakala	Pan-STARRS 1	·	1.8 km	MPC · JPL
788090	2016 PH_{161}	—	August 3, 2016	Haleakala	Pan-STARRS 1	·	2.6 km	MPC · JPL
788091	2016 PB_{166}	—	August 7, 2016	Haleakala	Pan-STARRS 1	BRA	1.2 km	MPC · JPL
788092	2016 PV_{166}	—	August 3, 2016	Haleakala	Pan-STARRS 1	EOS	1.2 km	MPC · JPL
788093	2016 PM_{168}	—	August 10, 2016	Haleakala	Pan-STARRS 1	·	1.4 km	MPC · JPL
788094	2016 PZ_{173}	—	August 2, 2016	Haleakala	Pan-STARRS 1	EOS	1.4 km	MPC · JPL
788095	2016 PU_{174}	—	August 3, 2016	Haleakala	Pan-STARRS 1	·	1.5 km	MPC · JPL
788096	2016 PT_{175}	—	August 7, 2016	Haleakala	Pan-STARRS 1	·	690 m	MPC · JPL
788097	2016 PA_{181}	—	August 8, 2016	Haleakala	Pan-STARRS 1	·	2.2 km	MPC · JPL
788098	2016 PT_{182}	—	August 2, 2016	Haleakala	Pan-STARRS 1	·	790 m	MPC · JPL
788099	2016 PL_{185}	—	August 9, 2016	Haleakala	Pan-STARRS 1	·	2.1 km	MPC · JPL
788100	2016 PL_{189}	—	August 8, 2016	Haleakala	Pan-STARRS 1	·	2.1 km	MPC · JPL

== 788101–788200 ==
back to top

Designation			Discovery			Properties		Ref
Permanent	Provisional	Named after	Date	Site	Discoverer(s)	Category	Diam.	Ref
788101	2016 PG_{191}	—	August 7, 2016	Haleakala	Pan-STARRS 1	·	1.7 km	MPC · JPL
788102	2016 PT_{193}	—	August 2, 2016	Haleakala	Pan-STARRS 1	·	2.4 km	MPC · JPL
788103	2016 PT_{194}	—	August 2, 2016	Haleakala	Pan-STARRS 1	·	1.2 km	MPC · JPL
788104	2016 PX_{196}	—	August 8, 2016	Haleakala	Pan-STARRS 1	·	2.0 km	MPC · JPL
788105	2016 PB_{197}	—	August 3, 2016	Haleakala	Pan-STARRS 1	·	3.0 km	MPC · JPL
788106	2016 PK_{197}	—	August 9, 2016	Haleakala	Pan-STARRS 1	·	1.9 km	MPC · JPL
788107	2016 PB_{200}	—	August 2, 2016	Haleakala	Pan-STARRS 1	·	1.4 km	MPC · JPL
788108	2016 PG_{200}	—	August 2, 2016	Haleakala	Pan-STARRS 1	·	2.1 km	MPC · JPL
788109	2016 PK_{202}	—	August 7, 2016	Haleakala	Pan-STARRS 1	VER	2.0 km	MPC · JPL
788110	2016 PU_{202}	—	August 7, 2016	Haleakala	Pan-STARRS 1	·	1.4 km	MPC · JPL
788111	2016 PF_{206}	—	August 3, 2016	Haleakala	Pan-STARRS 1	·	1.5 km	MPC · JPL
788112	2016 PH_{206}	—	August 2, 2016	Haleakala	Pan-STARRS 1	·	2.0 km	MPC · JPL
788113	2016 PJ_{206}	—	August 10, 2016	Haleakala	Pan-STARRS 1	·	2.1 km	MPC · JPL
788114	2016 PY_{206}	—	August 2, 2016	Haleakala	Pan-STARRS 1	·	1.8 km	MPC · JPL
788115	2016 PC_{209}	—	August 1, 2016	Haleakala	Pan-STARRS 1	·	1.5 km	MPC · JPL
788116	2016 PT_{210}	—	August 8, 2016	Haleakala	Pan-STARRS 1	EOS	1.4 km	MPC · JPL
788117	2016 PX_{210}	—	August 9, 2016	Haleakala	Pan-STARRS 1	·	1.8 km	MPC · JPL
788118	2016 PT_{211}	—	August 2, 2016	Haleakala	Pan-STARRS 1	·	2.2 km	MPC · JPL
788119	2016 PO_{212}	—	August 8, 2016	Haleakala	Pan-STARRS 1	·	1.2 km	MPC · JPL
788120	2016 PE_{214}	—	August 10, 2016	Haleakala	Pan-STARRS 1	·	2.1 km	MPC · JPL
788121	2016 PE_{217}	—	August 2, 2016	Haleakala	Pan-STARRS 1	·	1.9 km	MPC · JPL
788122	2016 PU_{217}	—	August 3, 2016	Haleakala	Pan-STARRS 1	·	1.3 km	MPC · JPL
788123	2016 PO_{232}	—	August 7, 2016	Haleakala	Pan-STARRS 1	·	1.0 km	MPC · JPL
788124	2016 PQ_{235}	—	August 10, 2016	Haleakala	Pan-STARRS 1	·	1.6 km	MPC · JPL
788125	2016 PY_{243}	—	May 24, 2015	Haleakala	Pan-STARRS 1	EOS	1.4 km	MPC · JPL
788126	2016 PE_{245}	—	August 2, 2016	Haleakala	Pan-STARRS 1	·	2.2 km	MPC · JPL
788127	2016 PD_{246}	—	September 2, 2011	Haleakala	Pan-STARRS 1	·	1.8 km	MPC · JPL
788128	2016 PR_{247}	—	August 7, 2016	Haleakala	Pan-STARRS 1	·	1.3 km	MPC · JPL
788129	2016 PS_{250}	—	August 7, 2016	Haleakala	Pan-STARRS 1	·	1.9 km	MPC · JPL
788130	2016 PT_{250}	—	August 7, 2016	Haleakala	Pan-STARRS 1	·	1.4 km	MPC · JPL
788131	2016 PU_{254}	—	August 7, 2016	Haleakala	Pan-STARRS 1	·	2.4 km	MPC · JPL
788132	2016 PZ_{255}	—	August 8, 2016	Haleakala	Pan-STARRS 1	·	2.2 km	MPC · JPL
788133	2016 PC_{256}	—	August 3, 2016	Haleakala	Pan-STARRS 1	EOS	1.2 km	MPC · JPL
788134	2016 PE_{257}	—	August 2, 2016	Haleakala	Pan-STARRS 1	·	2.2 km	MPC · JPL
788135	2016 PD_{258}	—	August 3, 2016	Haleakala	Pan-STARRS 1	·	2.0 km	MPC · JPL
788136	2016 PC_{260}	—	August 2, 2016	Haleakala	Pan-STARRS 1	EOS	1.3 km	MPC · JPL
788137	2016 PJ_{261}	—	August 7, 2016	Haleakala	Pan-STARRS 1	·	2.0 km	MPC · JPL
788138	2016 PC_{262}	—	August 2, 2016	Haleakala	Pan-STARRS 1	·	2.3 km	MPC · JPL
788139	2016 PK_{262}	—	August 10, 2016	Haleakala	Pan-STARRS 1	·	2.4 km	MPC · JPL
788140	2016 PK_{263}	—	August 8, 2016	Haleakala	Pan-STARRS 1	·	2.2 km	MPC · JPL
788141	2016 PQ_{264}	—	August 9, 2016	Haleakala	Pan-STARRS 1	·	1.7 km	MPC · JPL
788142	2016 PB_{265}	—	August 7, 2016	Haleakala	Pan-STARRS 1	·	2.1 km	MPC · JPL
788143	2016 PN_{265}	—	August 1, 2016	Haleakala	Pan-STARRS 1	·	2.2 km	MPC · JPL
788144	2016 PZ_{269}	—	August 10, 2016	Haleakala	Pan-STARRS 1	·	2.1 km	MPC · JPL
788145	2016 PC_{272}	—	August 8, 2016	Haleakala	Pan-STARRS 1	·	2.2 km	MPC · JPL
788146	2016 PL_{272}	—	August 1, 2016	Haleakala	Pan-STARRS 1	·	2.4 km	MPC · JPL
788147	2016 PC_{284}	—	August 10, 2016	Haleakala	Pan-STARRS 1	·	2.6 km	MPC · JPL
788148	2016 PT_{289}	—	August 7, 2016	Haleakala	Pan-STARRS 1	·	2.6 km	MPC · JPL
788149	2016 PW_{290}	—	August 3, 2016	Haleakala	Pan-STARRS 1	·	1.9 km	MPC · JPL
788150	2016 PP_{291}	—	August 7, 2016	Haleakala	Pan-STARRS 1	VER	1.8 km	MPC · JPL
788151	2016 PA_{293}	—	August 9, 2016	Haleakala	Pan-STARRS 1	·	2.0 km	MPC · JPL
788152	2016 PS_{294}	—	August 8, 2016	Haleakala	Pan-STARRS 1	·	1.3 km	MPC · JPL
788153 Trabia	2016 PT_{297}	Trabia	August 1, 2016	Mauna Kea	COIAS	·	1.2 km	MPC · JPL
788154	2016 PT_{306}	—	April 19, 2020	Haleakala	Pan-STARRS 1	·	1.6 km	MPC · JPL
788155	2016 QS	—	February 22, 2009	Calar Alto	F. Hormuth	·	1.8 km	MPC · JPL
788156	2016 QN_{6}	—	September 24, 2011	Haleakala	Pan-STARRS 1	TIR	2.1 km	MPC · JPL
788157	2016 QM_{15}	—	July 7, 2016	Haleakala	Pan-STARRS 1	·	2.1 km	MPC · JPL
788158	2016 QY_{21}	—	August 26, 2016	Haleakala	Pan-STARRS 1	·	1.6 km	MPC · JPL
788159	2016 QA_{23}	—	January 17, 2013	Kitt Peak	Spacewatch	·	2.9 km	MPC · JPL
788160	2016 QE_{25}	—	August 26, 2016	Haleakala	Pan-STARRS 1	·	2.2 km	MPC · JPL
788161	2016 QJ_{28}	—	July 7, 2016	Haleakala	Pan-STARRS 1	LIX	2.6 km	MPC · JPL
788162	2016 QV_{28}	—	May 16, 2010	Kitt Peak	Spacewatch	·	2.0 km	MPC · JPL
788163	2016 QO_{38}	—	February 26, 2014	Haleakala	Pan-STARRS 1	MAR	840 m	MPC · JPL
788164	2016 QC_{43}	—	September 28, 2011	Mount Lemmon	Mount Lemmon Survey	EOS	1.3 km	MPC · JPL
788165	2016 QO_{47}	—	July 12, 2016	Mount Lemmon	Mount Lemmon Survey	·	2.4 km	MPC · JPL
788166	2016 QZ_{53}	—	January 16, 2013	Haleakala	Pan-STARRS 1	·	2.5 km	MPC · JPL
788167	2016 QU_{55}	—	July 9, 2016	Haleakala	Pan-STARRS 1	·	2.8 km	MPC · JPL
788168	2016 QE_{59}	—	July 7, 2016	Haleakala	Pan-STARRS 1	·	2.1 km	MPC · JPL
788169	2016 QZ_{61}	—	July 11, 2016	Haleakala	Pan-STARRS 1	·	2.7 km	MPC · JPL
788170	2016 QV_{62}	—	September 4, 2011	Haleakala	Pan-STARRS 1	EOS	1.4 km	MPC · JPL
788171	2016 QQ_{64}	—	August 29, 2016	Mount Lemmon	Mount Lemmon Survey	·	1.6 km	MPC · JPL
788172	2016 QQ_{68}	—	January 23, 2015	Haleakala	Pan-STARRS 1	·	1.5 km	MPC · JPL
788173	2016 QH_{71}	—	October 24, 2011	Haleakala	Pan-STARRS 1	·	1.8 km	MPC · JPL
788174	2016 QD_{74}	—	August 29, 2016	Mount Lemmon	Mount Lemmon Survey	·	1.6 km	MPC · JPL
788175	2016 QJ_{81}	—	August 30, 2016	Mount Lemmon	Mount Lemmon Survey	·	1.6 km	MPC · JPL
788176	2016 QF_{82}	—	August 28, 2016	Mount Lemmon	Mount Lemmon Survey	·	2.2 km	MPC · JPL
788177	2016 QB_{90}	—	August 27, 2016	Haleakala	Pan-STARRS 1	·	1.3 km	MPC · JPL
788178	2016 QM_{90}	—	September 5, 2007	Mount Lemmon	Mount Lemmon Survey	·	1.3 km	MPC · JPL
788179	2016 QS_{95}	—	August 29, 2016	Mount Lemmon	Mount Lemmon Survey	·	2.8 km	MPC · JPL
788180	2016 QQ_{103}	—	August 26, 2016	Haleakala	Pan-STARRS 1	·	2.0 km	MPC · JPL
788181	2016 QV_{110}	—	August 27, 2016	Haleakala	Pan-STARRS 1	WIT	710 m	MPC · JPL
788182	2016 QE_{111}	—	August 29, 2016	Mount Lemmon	Mount Lemmon Survey	·	2.1 km	MPC · JPL
788183	2016 QH_{111}	—	August 27, 2016	Haleakala	Pan-STARRS 1	·	710 m	MPC · JPL
788184	2016 QE_{113}	—	August 27, 2016	Haleakala	Pan-STARRS 1	·	1.9 km	MPC · JPL
788185	2016 QF_{113}	—	August 30, 2016	Haleakala	Pan-STARRS 1	·	2.9 km	MPC · JPL
788186	2016 QN_{113}	—	August 29, 2016	Mount Lemmon	Mount Lemmon Survey	·	2.1 km	MPC · JPL
788187	2016 QS_{114}	—	August 30, 2016	Mount Lemmon	Mount Lemmon Survey	·	2.3 km	MPC · JPL
788188	2016 QK_{115}	—	August 27, 2016	Haleakala	Pan-STARRS 1	·	1.2 km	MPC · JPL
788189	2016 QH_{117}	—	August 30, 2016	Mount Lemmon	Mount Lemmon Survey	·	670 m	MPC · JPL
788190	2016 QL_{119}	—	August 27, 2016	Haleakala	Pan-STARRS 1	·	2.1 km	MPC · JPL
788191	2016 QA_{122}	—	August 31, 2005	Kitt Peak	Spacewatch	·	2.0 km	MPC · JPL
788192	2016 QW_{125}	—	August 30, 2016	Haleakala	Pan-STARRS 1	·	2.3 km	MPC · JPL
788193	2016 QT_{126}	—	August 30, 2016	Haleakala	Pan-STARRS 1	·	2.1 km	MPC · JPL
788194	2016 QU_{128}	—	August 30, 2016	Mount Lemmon	Mount Lemmon Survey	EOS	1.9 km	MPC · JPL
788195	2016 QS_{129}	—	August 26, 2016	Haleakala	Pan-STARRS 1	·	1.9 km	MPC · JPL
788196	2016 QJ_{134}	—	October 22, 2011	Mount Lemmon	Mount Lemmon Survey	·	1.5 km	MPC · JPL
788197	2016 QL_{136}	—	August 24, 2016	Kitt Peak	Spacewatch	HOF	2.1 km	MPC · JPL
788198	2016 QW_{143}	—	August 30, 2016	Haleakala	Pan-STARRS 1	EOS	1.6 km	MPC · JPL
788199	2016 QE_{145}	—	August 28, 2016	Mount Lemmon	Mount Lemmon Survey	THM	1.9 km	MPC · JPL
788200	2016 QQ_{145}	—	August 27, 2016	Haleakala	Pan-STARRS 1	VER	1.9 km	MPC · JPL

== 788201–788300 ==
back to top

Designation			Discovery			Properties		Ref
Permanent	Provisional	Named after	Date	Site	Discoverer(s)	Category	Diam.	Ref
788201	2016 QM_{146}	—	August 30, 2016	Haleakala	Pan-STARRS 1	·	2.1 km	MPC · JPL
788202	2016 QT_{147}	—	August 26, 2016	Haleakala	Pan-STARRS 1	·	2.0 km	MPC · JPL
788203	2016 QF_{148}	—	August 29, 2016	Mount Lemmon	Mount Lemmon Survey	·	2.4 km	MPC · JPL
788204	2016 QL_{148}	—	August 30, 2016	Mount Lemmon	Mount Lemmon Survey	EOS	1.6 km	MPC · JPL
788205	2016 QW_{148}	—	December 22, 2012	Haleakala	Pan-STARRS 1	·	2.6 km	MPC · JPL
788206	2016 QA_{151}	—	August 27, 2016	Haleakala	Pan-STARRS 1	·	1.9 km	MPC · JPL
788207	2016 QQ_{155}	—	August 29, 2016	Mount Lemmon	Mount Lemmon Survey	·	2.5 km	MPC · JPL
788208	2016 RH_{10}	—	September 4, 2011	Haleakala	Pan-STARRS 1	·	1.9 km	MPC · JPL
788209	2016 RG_{11}	—	August 3, 2016	Haleakala	Pan-STARRS 1	EOS	1.4 km	MPC · JPL
788210	2016 RZ_{13}	—	September 27, 2011	Mount Lemmon	Mount Lemmon Survey	VER	2.2 km	MPC · JPL
788211	2016 RW_{14}	—	October 24, 2011	Haleakala	Pan-STARRS 1	·	2.4 km	MPC · JPL
788212	2016 RJ_{22}	—	July 11, 2016	Haleakala	Pan-STARRS 1	·	1.4 km	MPC · JPL
788213	2016 RO_{22}	—	January 28, 2014	Kitt Peak	Spacewatch	·	2.4 km	MPC · JPL
788214	2016 RW_{22}	—	July 13, 2016	Mount Lemmon	Mount Lemmon Survey	VER	2.2 km	MPC · JPL
788215	2016 RO_{37}	—	June 18, 2010	Mount Lemmon	Mount Lemmon Survey	·	2.5 km	MPC · JPL
788216	2016 RL_{42}	—	January 27, 2015	Haleakala	Pan-STARRS 1	H	470 m	MPC · JPL
788217	2016 RA_{43}	—	October 13, 2007	Mount Lemmon	Mount Lemmon Survey	·	1.2 km	MPC · JPL
788218	2016 RS_{44}	—	October 12, 2007	Kitt Peak	Spacewatch	AGN	810 m	MPC · JPL
788219	2016 RU_{44}	—	September 10, 2016	Mount Lemmon	Mount Lemmon Survey	·	2.8 km	MPC · JPL
788220	2016 RC_{48}	—	September 6, 2016	Haleakala	Pan-STARRS 1	EUN	780 m	MPC · JPL
788221	2016 RV_{48}	—	September 10, 2016	Kitt Peak	Spacewatch	·	940 m	MPC · JPL
788222	2016 RS_{59}	—	September 12, 2016	Haleakala	Pan-STARRS 1	·	2.8 km	MPC · JPL
788223	2016 RB_{60}	—	September 12, 2016	Haleakala	Pan-STARRS 1	·	2.1 km	MPC · JPL
788224	2016 RN_{60}	—	September 5, 2016	Mount Lemmon	Mount Lemmon Survey	EOS	1.5 km	MPC · JPL
788225	2016 RO_{60}	—	September 12, 2016	Haleakala	Pan-STARRS 1	·	2.3 km	MPC · JPL
788226	2016 RY_{60}	—	September 10, 2016	Mount Lemmon	Mount Lemmon Survey	·	2.0 km	MPC · JPL
788227	2016 RJ_{61}	—	September 8, 2016	Haleakala	Pan-STARRS 1	EOS	1.4 km	MPC · JPL
788228	2016 RY_{64}	—	September 12, 2016	Mount Lemmon	Mount Lemmon Survey	·	790 m	MPC · JPL
788229	2016 RE_{65}	—	September 12, 2016	Haleakala	Pan-STARRS 1	·	1.7 km	MPC · JPL
788230	2016 RH_{69}	—	September 8, 2016	Haleakala	Pan-STARRS 1	·	2.2 km	MPC · JPL
788231	2016 RF_{70}	—	September 12, 2016	Haleakala	Pan-STARRS 1	·	1.2 km	MPC · JPL
788232	2016 RR_{73}	—	September 12, 2016	Haleakala	Pan-STARRS 1	·	2.2 km	MPC · JPL
788233	2016 RG_{75}	—	September 2, 2016	Mount Lemmon	Mount Lemmon Survey	·	2.0 km	MPC · JPL
788234	2016 RU_{76}	—	September 12, 2016	Haleakala	Pan-STARRS 1	·	2.2 km	MPC · JPL
788235	2016 RA_{77}	—	September 12, 2016	Haleakala	Pan-STARRS 1	EOS	1.4 km	MPC · JPL
788236	2016 RB_{77}	—	September 6, 2016	Mount Lemmon	Mount Lemmon Survey	·	2.2 km	MPC · JPL
788237	2016 RV_{77}	—	September 6, 2016	Mount Lemmon	Mount Lemmon Survey	·	2.6 km	MPC · JPL
788238	2016 RK_{78}	—	September 12, 2016	Haleakala	Pan-STARRS 1	·	1.9 km	MPC · JPL
788239	2016 RN_{79}	—	September 6, 2016	Mount Lemmon	Mount Lemmon Survey	EOS	1.3 km	MPC · JPL
788240	2016 RU_{79}	—	September 6, 2016	Mount Lemmon	Mount Lemmon Survey	EOS	1.3 km	MPC · JPL
788241	2016 RJ_{86}	—	September 10, 2016	Mount Lemmon	Mount Lemmon Survey	(1118)	2.5 km	MPC · JPL
788242	2016 RK_{87}	—	September 11, 2016	Mount Lemmon	Mount Lemmon Survey	·	1.2 km	MPC · JPL
788243	2016 RD_{92}	—	September 8, 2016	Haleakala	Pan-STARRS 1	·	2.6 km	MPC · JPL
788244	2016 RH_{92}	—	September 8, 2016	Haleakala	Pan-STARRS 1	·	2.5 km	MPC · JPL
788245	2016 RT_{103}	—	November 4, 2012	Mount Lemmon	Mount Lemmon Survey	·	990 m	MPC · JPL
788246	2016 SE_{26}	—	August 14, 2016	Haleakala	Pan-STARRS 1	·	1.2 km	MPC · JPL
788247	2016 SL_{26}	—	August 28, 2016	Mount Lemmon	Mount Lemmon Survey	·	2.4 km	MPC · JPL
788248	2016 SB_{39}	—	March 1, 2008	Kitt Peak	Spacewatch	(1118)	2.4 km	MPC · JPL
788249	2016 SE_{43}	—	December 5, 2008	Kitt Peak	Spacewatch	·	1.1 km	MPC · JPL
788250	2016 SH_{53}	—	September 26, 2016	Haleakala	Pan-STARRS 1	·	2.6 km	MPC · JPL
788251	2016 SV_{53}	—	September 26, 2016	Haleakala	Pan-STARRS 1	·	2.2 km	MPC · JPL
788252	2016 SS_{64}	—	September 27, 2016	Haleakala	Pan-STARRS 1	·	820 m	MPC · JPL
788253	2016 SY_{64}	—	October 9, 2007	Kitt Peak	Spacewatch	·	1.4 km	MPC · JPL
788254	2016 SV_{71}	—	September 30, 2016	Haleakala	Pan-STARRS 1	·	3.0 km	MPC · JPL
788255	2016 SO_{74}	—	September 30, 2016	Haleakala	Pan-STARRS 1	·	1.3 km	MPC · JPL
788256	2016 SW_{74}	—	September 26, 2016	Haleakala	Pan-STARRS 1	·	2.0 km	MPC · JPL
788257	2016 ST_{75}	—	September 25, 2016	Haleakala	Pan-STARRS 1	·	2.4 km	MPC · JPL
788258	2016 SR_{78}	—	September 27, 2016	Haleakala	Pan-STARRS 1	·	1.5 km	MPC · JPL
788259	2016 SA_{81}	—	September 27, 2016	Haleakala	Pan-STARRS 1	(5)	780 m	MPC · JPL
788260	2016 SL_{81}	—	September 25, 2016	Haleakala	Pan-STARRS 1	·	2.4 km	MPC · JPL
788261	2016 SF_{84}	—	September 25, 2016	Haleakala	Pan-STARRS 1	·	2.4 km	MPC · JPL
788262	2016 SN_{84}	—	September 30, 2016	Haleakala	Pan-STARRS 1	·	1.9 km	MPC · JPL
788263	2016 SX_{86}	—	September 26, 2016	Haleakala	Pan-STARRS 1	·	1.1 km	MPC · JPL
788264	2016 SD_{89}	—	September 30, 2016	Haleakala	Pan-STARRS 1	·	890 m	MPC · JPL
788265	2016 SF_{89}	—	September 25, 2016	Haleakala	Pan-STARRS 1	·	1.1 km	MPC · JPL
788266	2016 SQ_{89}	—	September 27, 2016	Haleakala	Pan-STARRS 1	·	1.2 km	MPC · JPL
788267	2016 SN_{102}	—	September 25, 2016	Mount Lemmon	Mount Lemmon Survey	·	2.1 km	MPC · JPL
788268	2016 SL_{104}	—	September 30, 2016	Haleakala	Pan-STARRS 1	EOS	1.2 km	MPC · JPL
788269	2016 SN_{104}	—	May 7, 2014	Haleakala	Pan-STARRS 1	·	2.4 km	MPC · JPL
788270	2016 SV_{104}	—	September 26, 2016	Haleakala	Pan-STARRS 1	·	1.4 km	MPC · JPL
788271	2016 SV_{110}	—	September 27, 2016	Mount Lemmon	Mount Lemmon Survey	615	930 m	MPC · JPL
788272	2016 SZ_{124}	—	September 30, 2016	Haleakala	Pan-STARRS 1	·	990 m	MPC · JPL
788273	2016 TO_{7}	—	December 31, 2008	Mount Lemmon	Mount Lemmon Survey	·	1.1 km	MPC · JPL
788274	2016 TT_{11}	—	October 1, 2016	Mount Lemmon	Mount Lemmon Survey	·	2.0 km	MPC · JPL
788275	2016 TJ_{22}	—	August 2, 2016	Haleakala	Pan-STARRS 1	·	1.4 km	MPC · JPL
788276	2016 TW_{32}	—	November 6, 2008	Kitt Peak	Spacewatch	MAR	750 m	MPC · JPL
788277	2016 TB_{49}	—	October 7, 2016	Haleakala	Pan-STARRS 1	·	2.4 km	MPC · JPL
788278	2016 TX_{50}	—	October 7, 2016	Haleakala	Pan-STARRS 1	·	2.1 km	MPC · JPL
788279	2016 TH_{53}	—	August 28, 2016	Mount Lemmon	Mount Lemmon Survey	·	2.0 km	MPC · JPL
788280	2016 TA_{59}	—	October 26, 2011	Haleakala	Pan-STARRS 1	·	2.2 km	MPC · JPL
788281	2016 TG_{64}	—	August 2, 2016	Haleakala	Pan-STARRS 1	·	2.3 km	MPC · JPL
788282	2016 TR_{64}	—	October 7, 2016	Haleakala	Pan-STARRS 1	·	1.6 km	MPC · JPL
788283	2016 TF_{93}	—	August 30, 2016	Haleakala	Pan-STARRS 1	AMO +1km	900 m	MPC · JPL
788284	2016 TT_{105}	—	October 1, 2016	Mount Lemmon	Mount Lemmon Survey	·	2.5 km	MPC · JPL
788285	2016 TC_{110}	—	October 10, 2016	Mount Lemmon	Mount Lemmon Survey	EOS	1.4 km	MPC · JPL
788286	2016 TR_{122}	—	October 7, 2016	Haleakala	Pan-STARRS 1	·	2.5 km	MPC · JPL
788287	2016 TB_{124}	—	October 2, 2016	Mount Lemmon	Mount Lemmon Survey	HOF	2.1 km	MPC · JPL
788288	2016 TK_{124}	—	October 9, 2016	Mount Lemmon	Mount Lemmon Survey	·	3.4 km	MPC · JPL
788289	2016 TU_{124}	—	October 5, 2016	Mount Lemmon	Mount Lemmon Survey	VER	1.9 km	MPC · JPL
788290	2016 TY_{125}	—	October 2, 2016	Mount Lemmon	Mount Lemmon Survey	·	2.3 km	MPC · JPL
788291	2016 TM_{129}	—	October 2, 2016	Mount Lemmon	Mount Lemmon Survey	·	1.1 km	MPC · JPL
788292	2016 TF_{132}	—	October 4, 2016	Kitt Peak	Spacewatch	PAD	1.3 km	MPC · JPL
788293	2016 TY_{133}	—	October 6, 2016	Haleakala	Pan-STARRS 1	·	1.2 km	MPC · JPL
788294	2016 TO_{134}	—	October 9, 2016	Haleakala	Pan-STARRS 1	·	2.3 km	MPC · JPL
788295	2016 TQ_{134}	—	October 11, 2016	Mount Lemmon	Mount Lemmon Survey	·	1.7 km	MPC · JPL
788296	2016 TO_{139}	—	October 13, 2016	Mount Lemmon	Mount Lemmon Survey	·	930 m	MPC · JPL
788297	2016 TB_{142}	—	October 13, 2016	Mount Lemmon	Mount Lemmon Survey	·	960 m	MPC · JPL
788298	2016 TM_{144}	—	October 6, 2016	Haleakala	Pan-STARRS 1	PAD	1.2 km	MPC · JPL
788299	2016 TJ_{146}	—	October 9, 2016	Haleakala	Pan-STARRS 1	URS	2.4 km	MPC · JPL
788300	2016 TP_{146}	—	October 1, 2016	Mount Lemmon	Mount Lemmon Survey	·	2.4 km	MPC · JPL

== 788301–788400 ==
back to top

Designation			Discovery			Properties		Ref
Permanent	Provisional	Named after	Date	Site	Discoverer(s)	Category	Diam.	Ref
788301	2016 TP_{150}	—	October 6, 2016	Haleakala	Pan-STARRS 1	MAR	750 m	MPC · JPL
788302	2016 TS_{151}	—	October 10, 2016	Mount Lemmon	Mount Lemmon Survey	·	840 m	MPC · JPL
788303	2016 TB_{155}	—	October 9, 2016	Mount Lemmon	Mount Lemmon Survey	·	2.0 km	MPC · JPL
788304	2016 TF_{169}	—	October 10, 2016	Haleakala	Pan-STARRS 1	·	2.5 km	MPC · JPL
788305	2016 TO_{172}	—	October 2, 2016	Mount Lemmon	Mount Lemmon Survey	EOS	1.4 km	MPC · JPL
788306	2016 TH_{173}	—	October 6, 2016	Haleakala	Pan-STARRS 1	·	2.1 km	MPC · JPL
788307	2016 TJ_{175}	—	October 7, 2016	Haleakala	Pan-STARRS 1	·	2.3 km	MPC · JPL
788308	2016 TL_{175}	—	October 6, 2016	Haleakala	Pan-STARRS 1	·	2.1 km	MPC · JPL
788309	2016 TO_{175}	—	October 4, 2016	Kitt Peak	Spacewatch	·	2.0 km	MPC · JPL
788310	2016 TF_{178}	—	October 7, 2016	Haleakala	Pan-STARRS 1	EOS	1.2 km	MPC · JPL
788311	2016 TY_{181}	—	October 7, 2016	Haleakala	Pan-STARRS 1	EOS	1.6 km	MPC · JPL
788312	2016 TC_{182}	—	October 12, 2016	Mount Lemmon	Mount Lemmon Survey	·	1.4 km	MPC · JPL
788313	2016 TZ_{186}	—	October 13, 2016	Haleakala	Pan-STARRS 1	·	2.3 km	MPC · JPL
788314	2016 UE_{8}	—	November 19, 2011	Mount Lemmon	Mount Lemmon Survey	·	2.8 km	MPC · JPL
788315	2016 UV_{23}	—	October 21, 2016	Mount Lemmon	Mount Lemmon Survey	·	710 m	MPC · JPL
788316	2016 UT_{24}	—	October 21, 2016	Mount Lemmon	Mount Lemmon Survey	·	1.6 km	MPC · JPL
788317	2016 UJ_{25}	—	December 4, 2012	Mount Lemmon	Mount Lemmon Survey	·	1.3 km	MPC · JPL
788318	2016 UT_{39}	—	October 25, 2012	Kitt Peak	Spacewatch	·	620 m	MPC · JPL
788319	2016 UY_{63}	—	November 7, 2012	Mount Lemmon	Mount Lemmon Survey	·	1.2 km	MPC · JPL
788320	2016 UG_{67}	—	November 21, 2008	Mount Lemmon	Mount Lemmon Survey	·	780 m	MPC · JPL
788321	2016 UV_{77}	—	October 23, 2008	Mount Lemmon	Mount Lemmon Survey	3:2 · SHU	3.7 km	MPC · JPL
788322	2016 UN_{85}	—	October 26, 2016	Haleakala	Pan-STARRS 1	·	1.0 km	MPC · JPL
788323	2016 UA_{89}	—	September 22, 2016	Mount Lemmon	Mount Lemmon Survey	·	740 m	MPC · JPL
788324	2016 UA_{94}	—	October 26, 2016	Haleakala	Pan-STARRS 1	MIS	1.6 km	MPC · JPL
788325	2016 UL_{109}	—	September 21, 2011	Mount Lemmon	Mount Lemmon Survey	·	1.2 km	MPC · JPL
788326	2016 UP_{121}	—	June 18, 2015	Haleakala	Pan-STARRS 1	·	2.0 km	MPC · JPL
788327	2016 UE_{127}	—	October 26, 2016	Haleakala	Pan-STARRS 1	·	1.2 km	MPC · JPL
788328	2016 UN_{129}	—	October 26, 2016	Haleakala	Pan-STARRS 1	fast	890 m	MPC · JPL
788329	2016 UV_{130}	—	May 4, 2014	Haleakala	Pan-STARRS 1	·	1.9 km	MPC · JPL
788330	2016 UC_{132}	—	October 26, 2016	Haleakala	Pan-STARRS 1	·	1.0 km	MPC · JPL
788331	2016 UM_{138}	—	October 13, 2016	Mount Lemmon	Mount Lemmon Survey	·	840 m	MPC · JPL
788332	2016 UQ_{149}	—	October 22, 2016	Mount Lemmon	Mount Lemmon Survey	·	1.8 km	MPC · JPL
788333	2016 UD_{217}	—	December 23, 2017	Haleakala	Pan-STARRS 1	·	1.5 km	MPC · JPL
788334	2016 UV_{223}	—	March 5, 2008	Mount Lemmon	Mount Lemmon Survey	·	1.3 km	MPC · JPL
788335	2016 UR_{224}	—	October 26, 2016	Haleakala	Pan-STARRS 1	·	1.1 km	MPC · JPL
788336	2016 UW_{224}	—	October 26, 2016	Haleakala	Pan-STARRS 1	KOR	930 m	MPC · JPL
788337	2016 UJ_{228}	—	October 26, 2016	Haleakala	Pan-STARRS 1	(7744)	910 m	MPC · JPL
788338	2016 UK_{228}	—	January 19, 2012	Haleakala	Pan-STARRS 1	·	2.3 km	MPC · JPL
788339	2016 UT_{229}	—	October 31, 2016	Haleakala	Pan-STARRS 1	·	2.2 km	MPC · JPL
788340	2016 UT_{247}	—	October 25, 2016	Haleakala	Pan-STARRS 1	AGN	800 m	MPC · JPL
788341	2016 UR_{251}	—	October 25, 2016	Haleakala	Pan-STARRS 1	AGN	840 m	MPC · JPL
788342	2016 UJ_{252}	—	September 30, 2016	Haleakala	Pan-STARRS 1	·	1.5 km	MPC · JPL
788343	2016 UY_{253}	—	October 28, 2016	Haleakala	Pan-STARRS 1	·	1.4 km	MPC · JPL
788344	2016 UB_{255}	—	October 28, 2016	Haleakala	Pan-STARRS 1	·	800 m	MPC · JPL
788345	2016 UT_{258}	—	October 19, 2016	Haleakala	Pan-STARRS 1	MAR	650 m	MPC · JPL
788346	2016 UM_{260}	—	October 26, 2016	Haleakala	Pan-STARRS 1	·	1.3 km	MPC · JPL
788347	2016 UQ_{260}	—	October 25, 2016	Haleakala	Pan-STARRS 1	·	820 m	MPC · JPL
788348	2016 UD_{261}	—	October 28, 2016	Haleakala	Pan-STARRS 1	·	1.2 km	MPC · JPL
788349	2016 UO_{261}	—	October 28, 2016	Haleakala	Pan-STARRS 1	·	1.0 km	MPC · JPL
788350	2016 UL_{266}	—	October 22, 2016	Kitt Peak	Spacewatch	KOR	960 m	MPC · JPL
788351	2016 UO_{266}	—	October 25, 2016	Haleakala	Pan-STARRS 1	·	1.3 km	MPC · JPL
788352	2016 UW_{268}	—	October 21, 2016	Mount Lemmon	Mount Lemmon Survey	·	2.2 km	MPC · JPL
788353	2016 UH_{269}	—	October 25, 2016	Haleakala	Pan-STARRS 1	·	1.0 km	MPC · JPL
788354	2016 UJ_{269}	—	October 21, 2016	Mount Lemmon	Mount Lemmon Survey	·	2.1 km	MPC · JPL
788355	2016 UY_{272}	—	October 28, 2016	Haleakala	Pan-STARRS 1	·	2.4 km	MPC · JPL
788356	2016 UT_{277}	—	October 20, 2016	Mount Lemmon	Mount Lemmon Survey	·	1.3 km	MPC · JPL
788357	2016 UE_{278}	—	October 27, 2016	Mount Lemmon	Mount Lemmon Survey	·	1.4 km	MPC · JPL
788358	2016 UR_{278}	—	October 30, 2016	Mount Lemmon	Mount Lemmon Survey	·	2.6 km	MPC · JPL
788359	2016 UA_{279}	—	October 21, 2016	Mount Lemmon	Mount Lemmon Survey	AST	1.3 km	MPC · JPL
788360	2016 UX_{279}	—	October 28, 2016	Haleakala	Pan-STARRS 1	·	2.7 km	MPC · JPL
788361	2016 VN_{10}	—	May 8, 2014	Haleakala	Pan-STARRS 1	EOS	1.3 km	MPC · JPL
788362	2016 VP_{23}	—	November 10, 2016	Haleakala	Pan-STARRS 1	·	1.1 km	MPC · JPL
788363	2016 VH_{33}	—	November 6, 2016	Mount Lemmon	Mount Lemmon Survey	HOF	2.0 km	MPC · JPL
788364	2016 VE_{38}	—	November 4, 2016	Haleakala	Pan-STARRS 1	·	820 m	MPC · JPL
788365	2016 VW_{39}	—	November 11, 2016	Mount Lemmon	Mount Lemmon Survey	MAR	800 m	MPC · JPL
788366	2016 VP_{42}	—	November 8, 2016	Haleakala	Pan-STARRS 1	·	1.1 km	MPC · JPL
788367	2016 VH_{53}	—	November 3, 2016	Haleakala	Pan-STARRS 1	·	1.7 km	MPC · JPL
788368	2016 VD_{60}	—	November 10, 2016	Haleakala	Pan-STARRS 1	MAR	610 m	MPC · JPL
788369	2016 WR_{12}	—	October 4, 2016	Mount Lemmon	Mount Lemmon Survey	DOR	2.0 km	MPC · JPL
788370	2016 WG_{13}	—	November 20, 2003	Kitt Peak	Spacewatch	HNS	860 m	MPC · JPL
788371	2016 WW_{14}	—	October 24, 2011	Mount Lemmon	Mount Lemmon Survey	·	1.8 km	MPC · JPL
788372	2016 WK_{18}	—	May 4, 2005	Mauna Kea	Veillet, C.	AGN	920 m	MPC · JPL
788373	2016 WL_{21}	—	September 9, 2015	Haleakala	Pan-STARRS 1	3:2	3.1 km	MPC · JPL
788374	2016 WM_{23}	—	September 27, 2006	Catalina	CSS	H	430 m	MPC · JPL
788375	2016 WZ_{29}	—	October 28, 2016	Haleakala	Pan-STARRS 1	·	1.6 km	MPC · JPL
788376	2016 WT_{31}	—	September 19, 2001	Kitt Peak	Spacewatch	·	1.5 km	MPC · JPL
788377	2016 WB_{37}	—	October 19, 2011	Kitt Peak	Spacewatch	·	1.4 km	MPC · JPL
788378	2016 WC_{41}	—	October 30, 2005	Kitt Peak	Spacewatch	·	1.9 km	MPC · JPL
788379	2016 WJ_{42}	—	July 25, 2015	Haleakala	Pan-STARRS 1	·	2.8 km	MPC · JPL
788380	2016 WB_{57}	—	July 19, 2015	Haleakala	Pan-STARRS 1	·	1.4 km	MPC · JPL
788381	2016 WU_{58}	—	November 26, 2016	Haleakala	Pan-STARRS 1	·	1.2 km	MPC · JPL
788382	2016 WC_{59}	—	October 27, 2016	Kitt Peak	Spacewatch	·	830 m	MPC · JPL
788383	2016 WJ_{59}	—	October 20, 2011	Mount Lemmon	Mount Lemmon Survey	·	1.5 km	MPC · JPL
788384	2016 WV_{59}	—	November 25, 2016	Mount Lemmon	Mount Lemmon Survey	KON	1.5 km	MPC · JPL
788385	2016 WM_{62}	—	January 18, 2013	Mount Lemmon	Mount Lemmon Survey	·	1.1 km	MPC · JPL
788386	2016 WO_{62}	—	November 25, 2016	Mount Lemmon	Mount Lemmon Survey	·	1.7 km	MPC · JPL
788387	2016 WQ_{63}	—	November 28, 2016	Haleakala	Pan-STARRS 1	·	910 m	MPC · JPL
788388	2016 WL_{65}	—	November 23, 2016	Mount Lemmon	Mount Lemmon Survey	·	2.1 km	MPC · JPL
788389	2016 WD_{67}	—	November 28, 2016	Haleakala	Pan-STARRS 1	·	1.2 km	MPC · JPL
788390	2016 WH_{67}	—	November 19, 2016	Mount Lemmon	Mount Lemmon Survey	·	910 m	MPC · JPL
788391	2016 WH_{69}	—	November 30, 2016	Mount Lemmon	Mount Lemmon Survey	·	930 m	MPC · JPL
788392	2016 WR_{69}	—	November 25, 2016	Mount Lemmon	Mount Lemmon Survey	(1547)	1.1 km	MPC · JPL
788393	2016 WK_{70}	—	November 25, 2016	Mount Lemmon	Mount Lemmon Survey	·	1.0 km	MPC · JPL
788394	2016 WO_{71}	—	June 26, 2015	Haleakala	Pan-STARRS 1	·	1.1 km	MPC · JPL
788395	2016 WS_{71}	—	November 28, 2016	Haleakala	Pan-STARRS 1	·	940 m	MPC · JPL
788396	2016 WW_{71}	—	November 18, 2016	Mount Lemmon	Mount Lemmon Survey	HNS	800 m	MPC · JPL
788397	2016 WK_{76}	—	November 23, 2016	Mount Lemmon	Mount Lemmon Survey	·	2.5 km	MPC · JPL
788398	2016 WH_{82}	—	November 2, 2006	Kitt Peak	Spacewatch	·	1.3 km	MPC · JPL
788399	2016 WR_{87}	—	November 28, 2016	Haleakala	Pan-STARRS 1	·	820 m	MPC · JPL
788400	2016 XE_{11}	—	October 12, 2010	Mount Lemmon	Mount Lemmon Survey	·	2.2 km	MPC · JPL

== 788401–788500 ==
back to top

Designation			Discovery			Properties		Ref
Permanent	Provisional	Named after	Date	Site	Discoverer(s)	Category	Diam.	Ref
788401	2016 XD_{24}	—	October 10, 2016	Mount Lemmon	Mount Lemmon Survey	·	1.2 km	MPC · JPL
788402	2016 XK_{27}	—	December 9, 2016	Mount Lemmon	Mount Lemmon Survey	BRA	1.0 km	MPC · JPL
788403	2016 XK_{28}	—	October 26, 2011	Haleakala	Pan-STARRS 1	·	1.3 km	MPC · JPL
788404	2016 XM_{30}	—	September 28, 2003	Anderson Mesa	LONEOS	·	870 m	MPC · JPL
788405	2016 XX_{31}	—	December 1, 2016	Mount Lemmon	Mount Lemmon Survey	·	780 m	MPC · JPL
788406	2016 XP_{33}	—	December 9, 2016	Mount Lemmon	Mount Lemmon Survey	·	1.6 km	MPC · JPL
788407	2016 XB_{34}	—	December 5, 2016	Mount Lemmon	Mount Lemmon Survey	·	980 m	MPC · JPL
788408	2016 YU_{5}	—	December 11, 2016	Mount Lemmon	Mount Lemmon Survey	·	1.1 km	MPC · JPL
788409	2016 YP_{12}	—	December 23, 2016	Haleakala	Pan-STARRS 1	URS	2.3 km	MPC · JPL
788410	2016 YG_{14}	—	January 19, 2012	Kitt Peak	Spacewatch	·	1.9 km	MPC · JPL
788411	2016 YV_{17}	—	December 24, 2016	Haleakala	Pan-STARRS 1	EOS	1.4 km	MPC · JPL
788412	2016 YB_{18}	—	December 23, 2016	Haleakala	Pan-STARRS 1	·	1.7 km	MPC · JPL
788413	2016 YC_{18}	—	December 23, 2016	Haleakala	Pan-STARRS 1	·	1.2 km	MPC · JPL
788414	2016 YO_{19}	—	December 23, 2016	Haleakala	Pan-STARRS 1	·	920 m	MPC · JPL
788415	2016 YM_{22}	—	December 22, 2016	Haleakala	Pan-STARRS 1	·	760 m	MPC · JPL
788416	2016 YQ_{22}	—	December 27, 2016	Mount Lemmon	Mount Lemmon Survey	HOF	2.1 km	MPC · JPL
788417	2016 YE_{23}	—	December 22, 2016	Haleakala	Pan-STARRS 1	·	920 m	MPC · JPL
788418	2016 YN_{23}	—	December 22, 2016	Haleakala	Pan-STARRS 1	·	1.0 km	MPC · JPL
788419	2016 YY_{23}	—	December 23, 2016	Haleakala	Pan-STARRS 1	·	800 m	MPC · JPL
788420	2016 YN_{24}	—	December 27, 2016	Mount Lemmon	Mount Lemmon Survey	·	780 m	MPC · JPL
788421	2016 YU_{24}	—	December 27, 2016	Mount Lemmon	Mount Lemmon Survey	·	1.1 km	MPC · JPL
788422	2016 YF_{25}	—	December 30, 2016	XuYi	PMO NEO Survey Program	·	790 m	MPC · JPL
788423	2016 YF_{26}	—	December 27, 2016	Mount Lemmon	Mount Lemmon Survey	HNS	880 m	MPC · JPL
788424	2016 YU_{26}	—	December 23, 2016	Haleakala	Pan-STARRS 1	·	790 m	MPC · JPL
788425	2016 YP_{28}	—	December 23, 2016	Haleakala	Pan-STARRS 1	·	910 m	MPC · JPL
788426	2016 YS_{34}	—	December 23, 2016	Haleakala	Pan-STARRS 1	·	1.1 km	MPC · JPL
788427	2016 YZ_{35}	—	January 3, 2009	Mount Lemmon	Mount Lemmon Survey	·	1.2 km	MPC · JPL
788428	2017 AM_{6}	—	June 15, 2015	Haleakala	Pan-STARRS 1	PHO	850 m	MPC · JPL
788429	2017 AM_{7}	—	February 3, 2013	Haleakala	Pan-STARRS 1	MAR	610 m	MPC · JPL
788430	2017 AL_{17}	—	January 31, 2009	Mount Lemmon	Mount Lemmon Survey	·	900 m	MPC · JPL
788431	2017 AF_{18}	—	November 10, 2016	Haleakala	Pan-STARRS 1	·	1.1 km	MPC · JPL
788432	2017 AZ_{22}	—	August 3, 2014	Haleakala	Pan-STARRS 1	EUN	930 m	MPC · JPL
788433	2017 AR_{23}	—	March 22, 2012	Mount Lemmon	Mount Lemmon Survey	·	2.1 km	MPC · JPL
788434	2017 AL_{25}	—	January 2, 2017	Haleakala	Pan-STARRS 1	·	1.2 km	MPC · JPL
788435	2017 AU_{25}	—	January 4, 2017	Haleakala	Pan-STARRS 1	·	1.2 km	MPC · JPL
788436	2017 AS_{26}	—	January 3, 2017	Haleakala	Pan-STARRS 1	·	1.3 km	MPC · JPL
788437	2017 AN_{27}	—	January 2, 2017	Haleakala	Pan-STARRS 1	·	2.0 km	MPC · JPL
788438	2017 AT_{29}	—	January 4, 2017	Haleakala	Pan-STARRS 1	·	970 m	MPC · JPL
788439	2017 AF_{30}	—	January 2, 2017	Haleakala	Pan-STARRS 1	EUN	750 m	MPC · JPL
788440	2017 AO_{33}	—	January 4, 2017	Haleakala	Pan-STARRS 1	BRG	990 m	MPC · JPL
788441	2017 AT_{33}	—	January 9, 2017	Mount Lemmon	Mount Lemmon Survey	KON	1.5 km	MPC · JPL
788442	2017 AW_{33}	—	January 2, 2017	Haleakala	Pan-STARRS 1	·	1.7 km	MPC · JPL
788443	2017 AY_{33}	—	January 4, 2017	Haleakala	Pan-STARRS 1	·	1.1 km	MPC · JPL
788444	2017 AZ_{33}	—	January 4, 2017	Haleakala	Pan-STARRS 1	·	2.1 km	MPC · JPL
788445	2017 AM_{34}	—	January 4, 2017	Haleakala	Pan-STARRS 1	·	1.1 km	MPC · JPL
788446	2017 AY_{34}	—	January 2, 2017	Haleakala	Pan-STARRS 1	·	890 m	MPC · JPL
788447	2017 AV_{36}	—	January 2, 2017	Haleakala	Pan-STARRS 1	·	650 m	MPC · JPL
788448	2017 AM_{38}	—	January 3, 2017	Haleakala	Pan-STARRS 1	EOS	1.6 km	MPC · JPL
788449	2017 AO_{38}	—	January 5, 2017	Mount Lemmon	Mount Lemmon Survey	·	1.2 km	MPC · JPL
788450	2017 AC_{39}	—	January 3, 2017	Haleakala	Pan-STARRS 1	·	1.4 km	MPC · JPL
788451	2017 AX_{42}	—	January 4, 2017	Haleakala	Pan-STARRS 1	·	1.4 km	MPC · JPL
788452	2017 AW_{43}	—	January 2, 2017	Haleakala	Pan-STARRS 1	·	720 m	MPC · JPL
788453	2017 AG_{45}	—	January 5, 2017	Mount Lemmon	Mount Lemmon Survey	·	1.5 km	MPC · JPL
788454	2017 AK_{45}	—	January 2, 2017	Haleakala	Pan-STARRS 1	L5	5.9 km	MPC · JPL
788455	2017 AT_{46}	—	January 4, 2017	Haleakala	Pan-STARRS 1	·	850 m	MPC · JPL
788456	2017 AA_{47}	—	January 3, 2017	Haleakala	Pan-STARRS 1	·	960 m	MPC · JPL
788457	2017 AG_{47}	—	January 2, 2017	Haleakala	Pan-STARRS 1	EUN	960 m	MPC · JPL
788458	2017 AR_{51}	—	January 3, 2017	Haleakala	Pan-STARRS 1	·	890 m	MPC · JPL
788459	2017 AB_{52}	—	January 4, 2017	Haleakala	Pan-STARRS 1	L5	6.8 km	MPC · JPL
788460	2017 AW_{55}	—	January 2, 2017	Haleakala	Pan-STARRS 1	·	1.3 km	MPC · JPL
788461	2017 AE_{58}	—	January 4, 2017	Haleakala	Pan-STARRS 1	EOS	1.4 km	MPC · JPL
788462	2017 AH_{58}	—	January 4, 2017	Haleakala	Pan-STARRS 1	VER	2.1 km	MPC · JPL
788463	2017 AE_{61}	—	February 9, 2008	Mount Lemmon	Mount Lemmon Survey	·	1.3 km	MPC · JPL
788464	2017 AH_{68}	—	January 7, 2017	Mount Lemmon	Mount Lemmon Survey	·	900 m	MPC · JPL
788465	2017 BE_{10}	—	November 10, 2016	Haleakala	Pan-STARRS 1	(5)	870 m	MPC · JPL
788466	2017 BE_{11}	—	February 5, 2013	Kitt Peak	Spacewatch	·	760 m	MPC · JPL
788467	2017 BT_{11}	—	January 24, 2017	Piszkéstető	K. Sárneczky	·	890 m	MPC · JPL
788468	2017 BC_{14}	—	June 27, 2015	Haleakala	Pan-STARRS 1	THB	2.7 km	MPC · JPL
788469	2017 BB_{16}	—	January 25, 2009	Kitt Peak	Spacewatch	(5)	750 m	MPC · JPL
788470	2017 BB_{17}	—	October 20, 2007	Mount Lemmon	Mount Lemmon Survey	·	950 m	MPC · JPL
788471	2017 BG_{18}	—	October 13, 2015	Haleakala	Pan-STARRS 1	·	1.0 km	MPC · JPL
788472	2017 BG_{20}	—	January 26, 2017	Mount Lemmon	Mount Lemmon Survey	ADE	1.4 km	MPC · JPL
788473	2017 BG_{24}	—	February 20, 2009	Mount Lemmon	Mount Lemmon Survey	MAR	730 m	MPC · JPL
788474	2017 BC_{37}	—	January 31, 2009	Kitt Peak	Spacewatch	·	860 m	MPC · JPL
788475	2017 BS_{40}	—	January 26, 2017	Mount Lemmon	Mount Lemmon Survey	·	1.4 km	MPC · JPL
788476	2017 BZ_{40}	—	September 4, 2010	Kitt Peak	Spacewatch	KOR	1.0 km	MPC · JPL
788477	2017 BC_{43}	—	July 25, 2015	Haleakala	Pan-STARRS 1	EUN	840 m	MPC · JPL
788478	2017 BE_{48}	—	January 26, 2017	Mount Lemmon	Mount Lemmon Survey	·	1.3 km	MPC · JPL
788479	2017 BE_{51}	—	February 3, 2009	Kitt Peak	Spacewatch	·	720 m	MPC · JPL
788480	2017 BH_{52}	—	February 2, 2005	Kitt Peak	Spacewatch	·	790 m	MPC · JPL
788481	2017 BP_{60}	—	August 21, 2015	Haleakala	Pan-STARRS 1	·	1.3 km	MPC · JPL
788482	2017 BP_{67}	—	December 23, 2016	Haleakala	Pan-STARRS 1	·	1.5 km	MPC · JPL
788483	2017 BQ_{67}	—	November 25, 2005	Kitt Peak	Spacewatch	·	1.4 km	MPC · JPL
788484	2017 BK_{69}	—	January 26, 2017	Mount Lemmon	Mount Lemmon Survey	KON	1.8 km	MPC · JPL
788485	2017 BN_{74}	—	January 27, 2017	Haleakala	Pan-STARRS 1	·	820 m	MPC · JPL
788486	2017 BY_{74}	—	February 3, 2013	Haleakala	Pan-STARRS 1	(5)	730 m	MPC · JPL
788487	2017 BH_{81}	—	January 27, 2012	Mount Lemmon	Mount Lemmon Survey	KOR	960 m	MPC · JPL
788488	2017 BM_{81}	—	January 27, 2017	Haleakala	Pan-STARRS 1	THM	1.7 km	MPC · JPL
788489	2017 BU_{84}	—	October 12, 2007	Mount Lemmon	Mount Lemmon Survey	·	820 m	MPC · JPL
788490	2017 BS_{86}	—	January 28, 2017	Mount Lemmon	Mount Lemmon Survey	LIX	2.5 km	MPC · JPL
788491	2017 BC_{87}	—	November 25, 2005	Mount Lemmon	Mount Lemmon Survey	·	1.8 km	MPC · JPL
788492	2017 BM_{100}	—	June 7, 2014	Haleakala	Pan-STARRS 1	·	1.1 km	MPC · JPL
788493	2017 BE_{101}	—	February 5, 2009	Kitt Peak	Spacewatch	·	730 m	MPC · JPL
788494	2017 BS_{101}	—	April 13, 2013	Haleakala	Pan-STARRS 1	·	1.2 km	MPC · JPL
788495	2017 BZ_{101}	—	January 28, 2017	Haleakala	Pan-STARRS 1	EOS	1.6 km	MPC · JPL
788496	2017 BB_{103}	—	January 4, 2000	Socorro	LINEAR	·	1.5 km	MPC · JPL
788497	2017 BZ_{103}	—	January 3, 2017	Haleakala	Pan-STARRS 1	ADE	1.3 km	MPC · JPL
788498	2017 BU_{110}	—	October 1, 2011	Mount Lemmon	Mount Lemmon Survey	·	1.1 km	MPC · JPL
788499	2017 BD_{115}	—	October 29, 2010	Mount Lemmon	Mount Lemmon Survey	TIR	1.8 km	MPC · JPL
788500	2017 BK_{118}	—	January 30, 2017	Haleakala	Pan-STARRS 1	·	840 m	MPC · JPL

== 788501–788600 ==
back to top

Designation			Discovery			Properties		Ref
Permanent	Provisional	Named after	Date	Site	Discoverer(s)	Category	Diam.	Ref
788501 Gabi	2017 BF_{119}	Gabi	January 30, 2017	Calar Alto	E. Schwab, D. Koschny	·	1.5 km	MPC · JPL
788502	2017 BL_{119}	—	November 3, 2007	Mount Lemmon	Mount Lemmon Survey	·	1.1 km	MPC · JPL
788503	2017 BL_{121}	—	October 9, 2007	Mount Lemmon	Mount Lemmon Survey	(5)	990 m	MPC · JPL
788504	2017 BD_{124}	—	December 23, 2016	Haleakala	Pan-STARRS 1	·	780 m	MPC · JPL
788505	2017 BL_{128}	—	January 17, 2013	Catalina	CSS	·	990 m	MPC · JPL
788506	2017 BF_{130}	—	January 26, 2017	Mount Lemmon	Mount Lemmon Survey	·	940 m	MPC · JPL
788507	2017 BP_{130}	—	January 26, 2017	Mount Lemmon	Mount Lemmon Survey	MAR	750 m	MPC · JPL
788508	2017 BS_{130}	—	April 20, 2009	Mount Lemmon	Mount Lemmon Survey	·	1.2 km	MPC · JPL
788509	2017 BQ_{132}	—	January 31, 2017	Haleakala	Pan-STARRS 1	·	1.5 km	MPC · JPL
788510	2017 BU_{133}	—	January 31, 2017	Haleakala	Pan-STARRS 1	·	920 m	MPC · JPL
788511	2017 BS_{135}	—	October 24, 2011	Haleakala	Pan-STARRS 1	·	1.1 km	MPC · JPL
788512	2017 BP_{138}	—	July 28, 2014	Haleakala	Pan-STARRS 1	KON	1.7 km	MPC · JPL
788513	2017 BX_{140}	—	March 6, 2013	Haleakala	Pan-STARRS 1	·	890 m	MPC · JPL
788514	2017 BN_{142}	—	January 26, 2017	Haleakala	Pan-STARRS 1	·	1.1 km	MPC · JPL
788515	2017 BB_{146}	—	January 19, 2017	Mount Lemmon	Mount Lemmon Survey	·	760 m	MPC · JPL
788516	2017 BD_{146}	—	January 31, 2017	Haleakala	Pan-STARRS 1	EUN	750 m	MPC · JPL
788517	2017 BF_{146}	—	January 30, 2017	Haleakala	Pan-STARRS 1	·	1.1 km	MPC · JPL
788518	2017 BC_{148}	—	January 28, 2017	Haleakala	Pan-STARRS 1	·	1.3 km	MPC · JPL
788519	2017 BJ_{150}	—	January 20, 2017	Haleakala	Pan-STARRS 1	·	1.5 km	MPC · JPL
788520	2017 BF_{152}	—	January 27, 2017	Haleakala	Pan-STARRS 1	·	740 m	MPC · JPL
788521	2017 BQ_{153}	—	January 27, 2017	Haleakala	Pan-STARRS 1	EUN	760 m	MPC · JPL
788522	2017 BC_{154}	—	January 27, 2017	Haleakala	Pan-STARRS 1	·	1.3 km	MPC · JPL
788523	2017 BB_{157}	—	January 28, 2017	Haleakala	Pan-STARRS 1	·	1.6 km	MPC · JPL
788524	2017 BJ_{157}	—	January 26, 2017	Haleakala	Pan-STARRS 1	(32418)	1.4 km	MPC · JPL
788525	2017 BZ_{157}	—	January 28, 2017	Haleakala	Pan-STARRS 1	·	870 m	MPC · JPL
788526	2017 BK_{158}	—	January 30, 2017	Kitt Peak	Spacewatch	·	830 m	MPC · JPL
788527	2017 BJ_{159}	—	January 30, 2017	Haleakala	Pan-STARRS 1	(5)	810 m	MPC · JPL
788528	2017 BO_{160}	—	January 28, 2017	Haleakala	Pan-STARRS 1	·	1.2 km	MPC · JPL
788529	2017 BT_{160}	—	January 31, 2017	Haleakala	Pan-STARRS 1	MAR	660 m	MPC · JPL
788530	2017 BX_{160}	—	January 20, 2017	Haleakala	Pan-STARRS 1	·	2.0 km	MPC · JPL
788531	2017 BU_{162}	—	January 20, 2017	Haleakala	Pan-STARRS 1	·	920 m	MPC · JPL
788532	2017 BT_{163}	—	January 29, 2017	Haleakala	Pan-STARRS 1	·	2.3 km	MPC · JPL
788533	2017 BG_{166}	—	January 30, 2017	Haleakala	Pan-STARRS 1	·	2.4 km	MPC · JPL
788534	2017 BC_{168}	—	January 28, 2017	Haleakala	Pan-STARRS 1	·	2.2 km	MPC · JPL
788535	2017 BS_{169}	—	January 27, 2017	Haleakala	Pan-STARRS 1	·	1.5 km	MPC · JPL
788536	2017 BX_{169}	—	January 30, 2017	Haleakala	Pan-STARRS 1	·	1.7 km	MPC · JPL
788537	2017 BH_{170}	—	January 27, 2017	Mount Lemmon	Mount Lemmon Survey	·	1.4 km	MPC · JPL
788538	2017 BB_{171}	—	January 30, 2017	Haleakala	Pan-STARRS 1	·	1.3 km	MPC · JPL
788539	2017 BF_{171}	—	January 26, 2017	Mount Lemmon	Mount Lemmon Survey	EUN	820 m	MPC · JPL
788540	2017 BX_{171}	—	December 30, 2007	Mount Lemmon	Mount Lemmon Survey	NEM	1.6 km	MPC · JPL
788541	2017 BA_{172}	—	January 28, 2017	Haleakala	Pan-STARRS 1	·	1.5 km	MPC · JPL
788542	2017 BJ_{175}	—	January 28, 2017	Haleakala	Pan-STARRS 1	·	750 m	MPC · JPL
788543	2017 BQ_{176}	—	January 31, 2017	Haleakala	Pan-STARRS 1	MAR	650 m	MPC · JPL
788544	2017 BX_{176}	—	January 27, 2017	Haleakala	Pan-STARRS 1	·	1.1 km	MPC · JPL
788545	2017 BZ_{177}	—	January 16, 2017	Haleakala	Pan-STARRS 1	·	1.0 km	MPC · JPL
788546	2017 BP_{178}	—	January 28, 2017	Haleakala	Pan-STARRS 1	·	800 m	MPC · JPL
788547	2017 BR_{178}	—	January 26, 2017	Mount Lemmon	Mount Lemmon Survey	(5)	730 m	MPC · JPL
788548	2017 BC_{180}	—	January 26, 2017	Mount Lemmon	Mount Lemmon Survey	·	630 m	MPC · JPL
788549	2017 BO_{181}	—	April 9, 2008	Kitt Peak	Spacewatch	·	1.3 km	MPC · JPL
788550	2017 BB_{182}	—	January 27, 2017	Haleakala	Pan-STARRS 1	·	1.4 km	MPC · JPL
788551	2017 BN_{183}	—	January 27, 2017	Haleakala	Pan-STARRS 1	·	710 m	MPC · JPL
788552	2017 BF_{185}	—	January 28, 2017	Mount Lemmon	Mount Lemmon Survey	·	1.4 km	MPC · JPL
788553	2017 BL_{186}	—	January 31, 2017	Mount Lemmon	Mount Lemmon Survey	·	600 m	MPC · JPL
788554	2017 BM_{186}	—	January 30, 2017	Haleakala	Pan-STARRS 1	·	870 m	MPC · JPL
788555	2017 BO_{186}	—	February 9, 2008	Mount Lemmon	Mount Lemmon Survey	GEF	810 m	MPC · JPL
788556	2017 BX_{186}	—	January 26, 2017	Haleakala	Pan-STARRS 1	·	850 m	MPC · JPL
788557	2017 BY_{186}	—	January 27, 2017	Haleakala	Pan-STARRS 1	·	1.1 km	MPC · JPL
788558	2017 BU_{189}	—	January 27, 2017	Haleakala	Pan-STARRS 1	·	920 m	MPC · JPL
788559	2017 BN_{190}	—	January 28, 2017	Haleakala	Pan-STARRS 1	·	1.0 km	MPC · JPL
788560	2017 BR_{190}	—	July 1, 2014	Haleakala	Pan-STARRS 1	·	1.2 km	MPC · JPL
788561	2017 BK_{191}	—	January 28, 2017	Haleakala	Pan-STARRS 1	·	800 m	MPC · JPL
788562	2017 BP_{191}	—	May 8, 2014	Haleakala	Pan-STARRS 1	HNS	590 m	MPC · JPL
788563	2017 BC_{193}	—	January 29, 2017	Mount Lemmon	Mount Lemmon Survey	EUN	890 m	MPC · JPL
788564	2017 BM_{193}	—	January 27, 2017	Haleakala	Pan-STARRS 1	HNS	860 m	MPC · JPL
788565	2017 BB_{195}	—	January 27, 2017	Haleakala	Pan-STARRS 1	·	1.2 km	MPC · JPL
788566	2017 BC_{195}	—	March 6, 2013	Haleakala	Pan-STARRS 1	·	990 m	MPC · JPL
788567	2017 BM_{196}	—	January 30, 2017	Haleakala	Pan-STARRS 1	EOS	1.3 km	MPC · JPL
788568	2017 BQ_{196}	—	January 26, 2017	Haleakala	Pan-STARRS 1	EUN	630 m	MPC · JPL
788569	2017 BT_{197}	—	January 26, 2017	Mount Lemmon	Mount Lemmon Survey	·	830 m	MPC · JPL
788570	2017 BH_{201}	—	January 26, 2017	Mount Lemmon	Mount Lemmon Survey	·	1.4 km	MPC · JPL
788571	2017 BD_{202}	—	January 23, 2006	Mount Lemmon	Mount Lemmon Survey	EOS	1.3 km	MPC · JPL
788572	2017 BP_{203}	—	January 28, 2017	Haleakala	Pan-STARRS 1	·	790 m	MPC · JPL
788573 Isaiah	2017 BO_{207}	Isaiah	December 30, 2016	Big Water	D. Rankin	MAR	690 m	MPC · JPL
788574	2017 BW_{208}	—	January 27, 2017	Haleakala	Pan-STARRS 1	EOS	1.3 km	MPC · JPL
788575	2017 BN_{209}	—	January 28, 2017	Haleakala	Pan-STARRS 1	·	680 m	MPC · JPL
788576	2017 BM_{211}	—	January 27, 2017	Haleakala	Pan-STARRS 1	·	1.4 km	MPC · JPL
788577	2017 BB_{221}	—	February 7, 2013	Kitt Peak	Spacewatch	·	1.1 km	MPC · JPL
788578	2017 BV_{221}	—	January 20, 2017	Haleakala	Pan-STARRS 1	·	1.6 km	MPC · JPL
788579	2017 BL_{222}	—	January 28, 2017	Haleakala	Pan-STARRS 1	KOR	900 m	MPC · JPL
788580	2017 BB_{230}	—	January 28, 2017	Mount Lemmon	Mount Lemmon Survey	·	740 m	MPC · JPL
788581	2017 BK_{254}	—	January 26, 2017	Mount Lemmon	Mount Lemmon Survey	·	1.5 km	MPC · JPL
788582	2017 BV_{254}	—	November 24, 2011	Mount Lemmon	Mount Lemmon Survey	·	1.3 km	MPC · JPL
788583	2017 BB_{258}	—	January 19, 2017	Mount Lemmon	Mount Lemmon Survey	·	1.1 km	MPC · JPL
788584	2017 CD_{4}	—	January 31, 2017	Mount Lemmon	Mount Lemmon Survey	·	1.1 km	MPC · JPL
788585	2017 CG_{6}	—	July 27, 2014	Haleakala	Pan-STARRS 1	·	750 m	MPC · JPL
788586	2017 CA_{7}	—	January 2, 2017	Haleakala	Pan-STARRS 1	·	1.2 km	MPC · JPL
788587	2017 CO_{8}	—	November 1, 2007	Mount Lemmon	Mount Lemmon Survey	·	730 m	MPC · JPL
788588	2017 CF_{12}	—	August 22, 2014	Haleakala	Pan-STARRS 1	EUN	980 m	MPC · JPL
788589	2017 CV_{13}	—	October 15, 2015	Haleakala	Pan-STARRS 1	·	1.3 km	MPC · JPL
788590	2017 CQ_{14}	—	February 24, 2009	Calar Alto	F. Hormuth	·	770 m	MPC · JPL
788591	2017 CU_{16}	—	August 21, 2015	Haleakala	Pan-STARRS 1	·	1.1 km	MPC · JPL
788592	2017 CB_{19}	—	February 8, 2013	Haleakala	Pan-STARRS 1	MAR	690 m	MPC · JPL
788593	2017 CY_{21}	—	January 28, 2017	Haleakala	Pan-STARRS 1	THM	1.6 km	MPC · JPL
788594	2017 CZ_{22}	—	March 11, 2008	Mount Lemmon	Mount Lemmon Survey	·	1.4 km	MPC · JPL
788595	2017 CD_{25}	—	July 14, 2013	Haleakala	Pan-STARRS 1	THM	1.9 km	MPC · JPL
788596	2017 CX_{26}	—	October 10, 2015	Haleakala	Pan-STARRS 1	·	970 m	MPC · JPL
788597	2017 CW_{27}	—	July 25, 2014	Haleakala	Pan-STARRS 1	KON	1.6 km	MPC · JPL
788598	2017 CH_{30}	—	September 9, 2015	Haleakala	Pan-STARRS 1	·	610 m	MPC · JPL
788599	2017 CG_{31}	—	November 17, 1999	Kitt Peak	Spacewatch	·	850 m	MPC · JPL
788600	2017 CS_{34}	—	February 5, 2005	Bergisch Gladbach	W. Bickel	·	670 m	MPC · JPL

== 788601–788700 ==
back to top

Designation			Discovery			Properties		Ref
Permanent	Provisional	Named after	Date	Site	Discoverer(s)	Category	Diam.	Ref
788601	2017 CD_{37}	—	February 2, 2017	Haleakala	Pan-STARRS 1	ADE	1.5 km	MPC · JPL
788602	2017 CT_{38}	—	February 2, 2017	Haleakala	Pan-STARRS 1	MAR	720 m	MPC · JPL
788603	2017 CC_{42}	—	February 2, 2017	Haleakala	Pan-STARRS 1	·	1.3 km	MPC · JPL
788604	2017 CU_{42}	—	February 2, 2017	Haleakala	Pan-STARRS 1	·	840 m	MPC · JPL
788605	2017 CK_{44}	—	February 3, 2017	Haleakala	Pan-STARRS 1	·	1.2 km	MPC · JPL
788606	2017 CZ_{44}	—	February 4, 2017	Haleakala	Pan-STARRS 1	MAR	730 m	MPC · JPL
788607	2017 CQ_{46}	—	February 2, 2017	Haleakala	Pan-STARRS 1	MAR	720 m	MPC · JPL
788608	2017 CB_{47}	—	February 4, 2017	Haleakala	Pan-STARRS 1	·	1.3 km	MPC · JPL
788609	2017 CG_{47}	—	February 2, 2017	Haleakala	Pan-STARRS 1	·	950 m	MPC · JPL
788610	2017 CK_{49}	—	December 4, 2015	Haleakala	Pan-STARRS 1	·	1.5 km	MPC · JPL
788611	2017 CL_{49}	—	February 1, 2017	Mount Lemmon	Mount Lemmon Survey	·	1.5 km	MPC · JPL
788612	2017 CV_{50}	—	February 3, 2017	Haleakala	Pan-STARRS 1	·	2.3 km	MPC · JPL
788613	2017 CW_{51}	—	February 2, 2017	Haleakala	Pan-STARRS 1	·	1.0 km	MPC · JPL
788614	2017 DT_{6}	—	January 30, 2017	Mount Lemmon	Mount Lemmon Survey	·	780 m	MPC · JPL
788615	2017 DA_{8}	—	November 17, 2015	Haleakala	Pan-STARRS 1	·	2.2 km	MPC · JPL
788616	2017 DB_{8}	—	April 29, 2009	Kitt Peak	Spacewatch	EUN	840 m	MPC · JPL
788617	2017 DM_{8}	—	September 23, 2015	Haleakala	Pan-STARRS 1	MAR	680 m	MPC · JPL
788618	2017 DK_{10}	—	February 1, 2017	Mount Lemmon	Mount Lemmon Survey	·	1.1 km	MPC · JPL
788619	2017 DG_{13}	—	January 4, 2017	Mount Lemmon	Mount Lemmon Survey	·	1.2 km	MPC · JPL
788620	2017 DD_{15}	—	September 16, 2010	Mount Lemmon	Mount Lemmon Survey	H	540 m	MPC · JPL
788621	2017 DP_{15}	—	December 11, 2012	Catalina	CSS	·	1.5 km	MPC · JPL
788622	2017 DW_{17}	—	December 19, 2003	Kitt Peak	Spacewatch	·	1.1 km	MPC · JPL
788623	2017 DK_{19}	—	March 1, 2008	Mount Lemmon	Mount Lemmon Survey	AGN	770 m	MPC · JPL
788624	2017 DT_{19}	—	July 6, 2014	Haleakala	Pan-STARRS 1	·	940 m	MPC · JPL
788625	2017 DJ_{20}	—	February 21, 2009	Kitt Peak	Spacewatch	·	740 m	MPC · JPL
788626	2017 DR_{20}	—	October 12, 2007	Catalina	CSS	·	860 m	MPC · JPL
788627	2017 DC_{22}	—	November 7, 2015	Mount Lemmon	Mount Lemmon Survey	HOF	1.9 km	MPC · JPL
788628	2017 DT_{24}	—	March 9, 2005	Kitt Peak	Spacewatch	·	700 m	MPC · JPL
788629	2017 DE_{30}	—	February 15, 2013	Haleakala	Pan-STARRS 1	·	830 m	MPC · JPL
788630	2017 DC_{31}	—	February 2, 2006	Kitt Peak	Spacewatch	·	2.1 km	MPC · JPL
788631	2017 DB_{39}	—	November 27, 2006	Mount Lemmon	Mount Lemmon Survey	·	1.3 km	MPC · JPL
788632	2017 DP_{39}	—	February 9, 2005	Mount Lemmon	Mount Lemmon Survey	·	830 m	MPC · JPL
788633	2017 DU_{41}	—	February 7, 2013	Kitt Peak	Spacewatch	·	840 m	MPC · JPL
788634	2017 DP_{46}	—	February 17, 2013	Kitt Peak	Spacewatch	·	930 m	MPC · JPL
788635	2017 DA_{49}	—	March 2, 2009	Mount Lemmon	Mount Lemmon Survey	·	660 m	MPC · JPL
788636	2017 DS_{51}	—	February 21, 2017	Mount Lemmon	Mount Lemmon Survey	·	1.0 km	MPC · JPL
788637	2017 DJ_{53}	—	January 3, 2017	Haleakala	Pan-STARRS 1	·	1.9 km	MPC · JPL
788638	2017 DD_{55}	—	February 2, 2009	Mount Lemmon	Mount Lemmon Survey	·	850 m	MPC · JPL
788639	2017 DJ_{55}	—	February 21, 2017	Mount Lemmon	Mount Lemmon Survey	·	1.5 km	MPC · JPL
788640	2017 DL_{57}	—	October 14, 2007	Mount Lemmon	Mount Lemmon Survey	·	950 m	MPC · JPL
788641	2017 DH_{58}	—	March 31, 2012	Mount Lemmon	Mount Lemmon Survey	TIR	1.9 km	MPC · JPL
788642	2017 DX_{60}	—	April 11, 2013	Palomar	Palomar Transient Factory	·	800 m	MPC · JPL
788643	2017 DQ_{64}	—	March 4, 2013	Haleakala	Pan-STARRS 1	·	890 m	MPC · JPL
788644	2017 DO_{67}	—	November 1, 2015	Kitt Peak	Spacewatch	·	1.4 km	MPC · JPL
788645	2017 DP_{69}	—	December 7, 2015	Haleakala	Pan-STARRS 1	·	1.1 km	MPC · JPL
788646	2017 DD_{76}	—	February 21, 2017	Haleakala	Pan-STARRS 1	ADE	1.3 km	MPC · JPL
788647	2017 DY_{79}	—	July 29, 2014	Haleakala	Pan-STARRS 1	·	1.5 km	MPC · JPL
788648	2017 DP_{81}	—	April 10, 2013	Catalina	CSS	·	1.4 km	MPC · JPL
788649	2017 DR_{87}	—	January 31, 2017	Haleakala	Pan-STARRS 1	·	1.5 km	MPC · JPL
788650	2017 DB_{89}	—	December 8, 2015	Mount Lemmon	Mount Lemmon Survey	·	2.2 km	MPC · JPL
788651	2017 DQ_{90}	—	February 22, 2017	Mount Lemmon	Mount Lemmon Survey	·	760 m	MPC · JPL
788652	2017 DV_{90}	—	March 14, 2013	Kitt Peak	Spacewatch	EUN	900 m	MPC · JPL
788653	2017 DZ_{90}	—	July 8, 2014	Haleakala	Pan-STARRS 1	·	900 m	MPC · JPL
788654	2017 DP_{92}	—	January 26, 2017	Haleakala	Pan-STARRS 1	3:2	4.2 km	MPC · JPL
788655	2017 DN_{93}	—	January 2, 2017	Haleakala	Pan-STARRS 1	·	740 m	MPC · JPL
788656	2017 DQ_{95}	—	February 3, 2017	Haleakala	Pan-STARRS 1	·	2.0 km	MPC · JPL
788657	2017 DY_{97}	—	February 22, 2017	Haleakala	Pan-STARRS 1	·	1.2 km	MPC · JPL
788658	2017 DS_{99}	—	February 22, 2017	Haleakala	Pan-STARRS 1	·	720 m	MPC · JPL
788659	2017 DF_{102}	—	June 27, 2014	Haleakala	Pan-STARRS 1	·	900 m	MPC · JPL
788660	2017 DD_{104}	—	January 4, 2017	Haleakala	Pan-STARRS 1	·	2.3 km	MPC · JPL
788661	2017 DC_{105}	—	September 9, 2015	Haleakala	Pan-STARRS 1	LIX	2.4 km	MPC · JPL
788662	2017 DC_{110}	—	July 19, 2015	Haleakala	Pan-STARRS 1	RAF	680 m	MPC · JPL
788663	2017 DW_{121}	—	August 14, 2013	Haleakala	Pan-STARRS 1	·	2.1 km	MPC · JPL
788664	2017 DM_{128}	—	February 25, 2017	Haleakala	Pan-STARRS 1	KON	1.7 km	MPC · JPL
788665	2017 DF_{130}	—	February 25, 2017	Haleakala	Pan-STARRS 1	EOS	1.3 km	MPC · JPL
788666	2017 DQ_{130}	—	February 22, 2017	Haleakala	Pan-STARRS 1	·	1.1 km	MPC · JPL
788667	2017 DE_{131}	—	February 21, 2017	Haleakala	Pan-STARRS 1	·	950 m	MPC · JPL
788668	2017 DA_{133}	—	February 25, 2017	Mount Lemmon	Mount Lemmon Survey	·	850 m	MPC · JPL
788669	2017 DM_{134}	—	February 22, 2017	Mount Lemmon	Mount Lemmon Survey	·	950 m	MPC · JPL
788670	2017 DN_{134}	—	February 25, 2017	Haleakala	Pan-STARRS 1	·	2.4 km	MPC · JPL
788671	2017 DG_{135}	—	February 22, 2017	Mount Lemmon	Mount Lemmon Survey	·	2.6 km	MPC · JPL
788672	2017 DP_{135}	—	February 22, 2017	Mount Lemmon	Mount Lemmon Survey	·	1.5 km	MPC · JPL
788673	2017 DW_{135}	—	February 21, 2017	Haleakala	Pan-STARRS 1	AGN	890 m	MPC · JPL
788674	2017 DX_{136}	—	February 18, 2017	Haleakala	Pan-STARRS 1	·	1.5 km	MPC · JPL
788675	2017 DD_{137}	—	February 22, 2017	Mount Lemmon	Mount Lemmon Survey	·	1.0 km	MPC · JPL
788676	2017 DQ_{137}	—	February 18, 2017	Haleakala	Pan-STARRS 1	·	1.3 km	MPC · JPL
788677	2017 DY_{137}	—	February 21, 2017	Mount Lemmon	Mount Lemmon Survey	·	1.3 km	MPC · JPL
788678	2017 DB_{138}	—	February 21, 2017	Haleakala	Pan-STARRS 1	·	1.0 km	MPC · JPL
788679	2017 DL_{138}	—	February 21, 2017	Haleakala	Pan-STARRS 1	·	670 m	MPC · JPL
788680	2017 DP_{139}	—	February 4, 2017	Haleakala	Pan-STARRS 1	·	1.6 km	MPC · JPL
788681	2017 DS_{139}	—	February 22, 2017	Haleakala	Pan-STARRS 1	HNS	730 m	MPC · JPL
788682	2017 DV_{140}	—	February 25, 2017	Haleakala	Pan-STARRS 1	·	1.9 km	MPC · JPL
788683	2017 DH_{141}	—	February 22, 2017	Haleakala	Pan-STARRS 1	HNS	720 m	MPC · JPL
788684	2017 DQ_{143}	—	January 31, 2017	Mount Lemmon	Mount Lemmon Survey	·	950 m	MPC · JPL
788685	2017 DR_{145}	—	February 22, 2017	Haleakala	Pan-STARRS 1	·	1.9 km	MPC · JPL
788686	2017 DT_{146}	—	November 24, 2003	Kitt Peak	Spacewatch	EUN	750 m	MPC · JPL
788687	2017 DM_{147}	—	February 17, 2017	Haleakala	Pan-STARRS 1	·	890 m	MPC · JPL
788688	2017 DV_{148}	—	February 25, 2017	Haleakala	Pan-STARRS 1	·	640 m	MPC · JPL
788689	2017 DU_{149}	—	February 21, 2017	Mount Lemmon	Mount Lemmon Survey	·	1.4 km	MPC · JPL
788690	2017 DY_{149}	—	February 24, 2017	Haleakala	Pan-STARRS 1	·	1.3 km	MPC · JPL
788691	2017 DO_{151}	—	February 21, 2017	Haleakala	Pan-STARRS 1	·	1.1 km	MPC · JPL
788692	2017 DG_{162}	—	February 22, 2017	Mount Lemmon	Mount Lemmon Survey	·	1.3 km	MPC · JPL
788693	2017 ES_{7}	—	April 16, 2013	Haleakala	Pan-STARRS 1	·	1.1 km	MPC · JPL
788694	2017 EH_{9}	—	April 12, 2013	Haleakala	Pan-STARRS 1	·	1.2 km	MPC · JPL
788695	2017 EV_{12}	—	February 25, 2011	Mount Lemmon	Mount Lemmon Survey	·	2.4 km	MPC · JPL
788696	2017 EW_{12}	—	March 8, 2013	Haleakala	Pan-STARRS 1	KON	1.7 km	MPC · JPL
788697	2017 EJ_{15}	—	November 18, 2015	Haleakala	Pan-STARRS 1	HNS	760 m	MPC · JPL
788698	2017 EO_{16}	—	March 4, 2017	Haleakala	Pan-STARRS 1	·	740 m	MPC · JPL
788699	2017 EW_{18}	—	January 26, 2017	Haleakala	Pan-STARRS 1	·	1.2 km	MPC · JPL
788700	2017 EE_{21}	—	November 14, 2015	Mount Lemmon	Mount Lemmon Survey	·	850 m	MPC · JPL

== 788701–788800 ==
back to top

Designation			Discovery			Properties		Ref
Permanent	Provisional	Named after	Date	Site	Discoverer(s)	Category	Diam.	Ref
788701	2017 ET_{29}	—	March 8, 2017	Mount Lemmon	Mount Lemmon Survey	·	940 m	MPC · JPL
788702	2017 EN_{31}	—	March 4, 2017	Haleakala	Pan-STARRS 1	·	1.5 km	MPC · JPL
788703	2017 EP_{31}	—	March 7, 2017	Haleakala	Pan-STARRS 1	·	880 m	MPC · JPL
788704	2017 EN_{32}	—	March 5, 2017	Haleakala	Pan-STARRS 1	THM	1.8 km	MPC · JPL
788705	2017 EZ_{32}	—	March 6, 2017	Haleakala	Pan-STARRS 1	MAR	770 m	MPC · JPL
788706	2017 EZ_{33}	—	March 5, 2017	Haleakala	Pan-STARRS 1	·	840 m	MPC · JPL
788707	2017 EQ_{36}	—	March 7, 2017	Mount Lemmon	Mount Lemmon Survey	KON	1.4 km	MPC · JPL
788708	2017 EZ_{36}	—	March 5, 2017	Haleakala	Pan-STARRS 1	·	800 m	MPC · JPL
788709	2017 EC_{37}	—	March 5, 2017	Haleakala	Pan-STARRS 1	·	760 m	MPC · JPL
788710	2017 ED_{37}	—	March 4, 2017	Haleakala	Pan-STARRS 1	·	910 m	MPC · JPL
788711	2017 EO_{37}	—	March 8, 2017	Mount Lemmon	Mount Lemmon Survey	·	680 m	MPC · JPL
788712	2017 ES_{37}	—	March 7, 2017	Haleakala	Pan-STARRS 1	·	1.1 km	MPC · JPL
788713	2017 EX_{37}	—	March 5, 2017	Haleakala	Pan-STARRS 1	EUN	750 m	MPC · JPL
788714	2017 EW_{39}	—	March 5, 2017	Haleakala	Pan-STARRS 1	·	920 m	MPC · JPL
788715	2017 EL_{43}	—	March 5, 2017	Haleakala	Pan-STARRS 1	EOS	1.3 km	MPC · JPL
788716	2017 EU_{45}	—	March 7, 2017	Haleakala	Pan-STARRS 1	615	1.1 km	MPC · JPL
788717	2017 EY_{45}	—	March 7, 2017	Haleakala	Pan-STARRS 1	AGN	810 m	MPC · JPL
788718	2017 EH_{46}	—	March 4, 2017	Haleakala	Pan-STARRS 1	·	750 m	MPC · JPL
788719	2017 EJ_{46}	—	March 7, 2017	Haleakala	Pan-STARRS 1	·	1.0 km	MPC · JPL
788720	2017 EL_{49}	—	March 7, 2017	Haleakala	Pan-STARRS 1	·	1.0 km	MPC · JPL
788721	2017 ED_{60}	—	March 4, 2017	Haleakala	Pan-STARRS 1	·	1.5 km	MPC · JPL
788722	2017 EM_{60}	—	March 4, 2017	Haleakala	Pan-STARRS 1	·	1.3 km	MPC · JPL
788723	2017 FM_{7}	—	February 5, 2011	Mount Lemmon	Mount Lemmon Survey	VER	2.0 km	MPC · JPL
788724	2017 FJ_{10}	—	February 22, 2017	Mount Lemmon	Mount Lemmon Survey	·	900 m	MPC · JPL
788725	2017 FW_{11}	—	February 22, 2017	Mount Lemmon	Mount Lemmon Survey	·	1.5 km	MPC · JPL
788726	2017 FZ_{12}	—	January 4, 2016	Haleakala	Pan-STARRS 1	·	2.1 km	MPC · JPL
788727	2017 FY_{14}	—	October 3, 2014	Mount Lemmon	Mount Lemmon Survey	·	2.0 km	MPC · JPL
788728	2017 FP_{16}	—	September 10, 2010	Kitt Peak	Spacewatch	AGN	940 m	MPC · JPL
788729	2017 FY_{19}	—	March 18, 2017	Haleakala	Pan-STARRS 1	VER	1.9 km	MPC · JPL
788730	2017 FN_{21}	—	March 17, 2009	Kitt Peak	Spacewatch	·	900 m	MPC · JPL
788731	2017 FE_{22}	—	March 18, 2017	Haleakala	Pan-STARRS 1	·	900 m	MPC · JPL
788732	2017 FE_{26}	—	February 21, 2017	Haleakala	Pan-STARRS 1	·	1.3 km	MPC · JPL
788733	2017 FL_{26}	—	October 23, 2011	Haleakala	Pan-STARRS 1	·	930 m	MPC · JPL
788734	2017 FP_{28}	—	April 10, 2013	Haleakala	Pan-STARRS 1	·	970 m	MPC · JPL
788735	2017 FK_{29}	—	March 18, 2017	Mount Lemmon	Mount Lemmon Survey	·	1.5 km	MPC · JPL
788736	2017 FZ_{30}	—	March 3, 2006	Kitt Peak	Spacewatch	THM	1.7 km	MPC · JPL
788737	2017 FX_{31}	—	November 16, 2007	Mount Lemmon	Mount Lemmon Survey	·	950 m	MPC · JPL
788738	2017 FF_{33}	—	September 15, 1998	Kitt Peak	Spacewatch	EOS	1.2 km	MPC · JPL
788739	2017 FB_{34}	—	January 4, 2017	Haleakala	Pan-STARRS 1	EUN	830 m	MPC · JPL
788740	2017 FC_{34}	—	January 4, 2017	Haleakala	Pan-STARRS 1	EUN	860 m	MPC · JPL
788741	2017 FL_{35}	—	February 13, 2008	Kitt Peak	Spacewatch	·	1.3 km	MPC · JPL
788742	2017 FP_{37}	—	March 18, 2017	Haleakala	Pan-STARRS 1	EUN	760 m	MPC · JPL
788743	2017 FU_{37}	—	March 18, 2017	Haleakala	Pan-STARRS 1	·	740 m	MPC · JPL
788744	2017 FE_{39}	—	October 9, 2015	Haleakala	Pan-STARRS 1	·	1.2 km	MPC · JPL
788745	2017 FF_{41}	—	March 18, 2017	Mount Lemmon	Mount Lemmon Survey	·	1.3 km	MPC · JPL
788746	2017 FU_{41}	—	January 27, 2017	Haleakala	Pan-STARRS 1	·	970 m	MPC · JPL
788747	2017 FD_{45}	—	August 20, 2014	Haleakala	Pan-STARRS 1	·	1.5 km	MPC · JPL
788748	2017 FB_{47}	—	February 21, 2017	Haleakala	Pan-STARRS 1	·	1.2 km	MPC · JPL
788749	2017 FT_{56}	—	December 17, 2003	Kitt Peak	Spacewatch	JUN	830 m	MPC · JPL
788750	2017 FU_{59}	—	March 4, 2017	Haleakala	Pan-STARRS 1	HOF	1.7 km	MPC · JPL
788751	2017 FL_{62}	—	October 17, 2003	Kitt Peak	Spacewatch	·	2.2 km	MPC · JPL
788752	2017 FS_{68}	—	February 22, 2017	Mount Lemmon	Mount Lemmon Survey	·	1.5 km	MPC · JPL
788753	2017 FH_{73}	—	June 16, 2007	Kitt Peak	Spacewatch	·	2.6 km	MPC · JPL
788754	2017 FE_{76}	—	January 30, 2017	Haleakala	Pan-STARRS 1	EUN	1.0 km	MPC · JPL
788755	2017 FF_{76}	—	February 1, 1995	Kitt Peak	Spacewatch	·	1.7 km	MPC · JPL
788756	2017 FL_{76}	—	January 30, 2017	Haleakala	Pan-STARRS 1	JUN	790 m	MPC · JPL
788757	2017 FK_{77}	—	March 19, 2017	Mount Lemmon	Mount Lemmon Survey	·	980 m	MPC · JPL
788758	2017 FN_{78}	—	October 13, 2015	Haleakala	Pan-STARRS 1	·	1.2 km	MPC · JPL
788759	2017 FB_{79}	—	March 4, 2017	Haleakala	Pan-STARRS 1	·	2.4 km	MPC · JPL
788760	2017 FC_{79}	—	April 11, 2013	Mount Lemmon	Mount Lemmon Survey	·	900 m	MPC · JPL
788761	2017 FD_{79}	—	February 3, 2012	Haleakala	Pan-STARRS 1	·	1.5 km	MPC · JPL
788762	2017 FM_{83}	—	April 15, 2013	Haleakala	Pan-STARRS 1	·	1.0 km	MPC · JPL
788763	2017 FP_{83}	—	February 3, 2008	Kitt Peak	Spacewatch	·	1.1 km	MPC · JPL
788764 Alexandrumironov	2017 FZ_{83}	Alexandrumironov	September 22, 2014	La Palma	EURONEAR	·	1.3 km	MPC · JPL
788765	2017 FV_{85}	—	October 2, 2006	Kitt Peak	Spacewatch	MAR	730 m	MPC · JPL
788766	2017 FG_{86}	—	March 21, 2017	Haleakala	Pan-STARRS 1	MAR	640 m	MPC · JPL
788767	2017 FF_{87}	—	March 21, 2017	Haleakala	Pan-STARRS 1	·	890 m	MPC · JPL
788768	2017 FR_{87}	—	March 21, 2017	Haleakala	Pan-STARRS 1	·	1.0 km	MPC · JPL
788769	2017 FU_{87}	—	November 18, 2009	Mount Lemmon	Mount Lemmon Survey	·	1.7 km	MPC · JPL
788770	2017 FM_{88}	—	April 19, 2013	Haleakala	Pan-STARRS 1	EUN	820 m	MPC · JPL
788771	2017 FS_{88}	—	January 11, 2008	Kitt Peak	Spacewatch	·	950 m	MPC · JPL
788772	2017 FD_{90}	—	March 24, 2017	Haleakala	Pan-STARRS 1	H	370 m	MPC · JPL
788773	2017 FJ_{92}	—	January 9, 2016	Haleakala	Pan-STARRS 1	·	2.0 km	MPC · JPL
788774	2017 FC_{94}	—	March 21, 2017	Haleakala	Pan-STARRS 1	·	1.5 km	MPC · JPL
788775	2017 FU_{95}	—	September 19, 2014	Haleakala	Pan-STARRS 1	·	1.8 km	MPC · JPL
788776	2017 FB_{97}	—	February 21, 2017	Haleakala	Pan-STARRS 1	·	830 m	MPC · JPL
788777	2017 FC_{104}	—	March 5, 2017	Haleakala	Pan-STARRS 1	·	1.4 km	MPC · JPL
788778	2017 FS_{106}	—	September 19, 2014	Haleakala	Pan-STARRS 1	·	1.2 km	MPC · JPL
788779	2017 FM_{107}	—	April 20, 2012	Mount Lemmon	Mount Lemmon Survey	·	1.7 km	MPC · JPL
788780	2017 FR_{108}	—	March 25, 2017	Haleakala	Pan-STARRS 1	·	930 m	MPC · JPL
788781	2017 FV_{108}	—	December 6, 2015	Mount Lemmon	Mount Lemmon Survey	·	2.6 km	MPC · JPL
788782	2017 FM_{112}	—	August 3, 2014	Haleakala	Pan-STARRS 1	HOF	1.9 km	MPC · JPL
788783	2017 FL_{113}	—	February 21, 2017	Haleakala	Pan-STARRS 1	BRG	850 m	MPC · JPL
788784	2017 FS_{113}	—	March 19, 2017	Haleakala	Pan-STARRS 1	(5)	720 m	MPC · JPL
788785	2017 FK_{115}	—	August 28, 2014	Haleakala	Pan-STARRS 1	·	1.2 km	MPC · JPL
788786	2017 FY_{115}	—	March 19, 2017	Haleakala	Pan-STARRS 1	·	1.3 km	MPC · JPL
788787	2017 FH_{116}	—	December 14, 2010	Mount Lemmon	Mount Lemmon Survey	·	1.3 km	MPC · JPL
788788	2017 FQ_{117}	—	September 1, 2013	Mount Lemmon	Mount Lemmon Survey	·	1.9 km	MPC · JPL
788789	2017 FQ_{118}	—	November 1, 2010	Mount Lemmon	Mount Lemmon Survey	·	900 m	MPC · JPL
788790	2017 FM_{119}	—	April 10, 2013	Mount Lemmon	Mount Lemmon Survey	·	1.1 km	MPC · JPL
788791	2017 FW_{119}	—	April 18, 2009	Kitt Peak	Spacewatch	·	940 m	MPC · JPL
788792	2017 FE_{123}	—	January 30, 2017	Haleakala	Pan-STARRS 1	·	1.4 km	MPC · JPL
788793	2017 FR_{123}	—	May 3, 2013	Haleakala	Pan-STARRS 1	MAR	640 m	MPC · JPL
788794	2017 FX_{123}	—	March 27, 2017	Mount Lemmon	Mount Lemmon Survey	MIS	1.8 km	MPC · JPL
788795	2017 FD_{124}	—	April 1, 2000	Kitt Peak	Spacewatch	·	1.2 km	MPC · JPL
788796	2017 FW_{124}	—	September 15, 2014	Mount Lemmon	Mount Lemmon Survey	·	1.2 km	MPC · JPL
788797	2017 FB_{125}	—	March 29, 2008	Vail-Jarnac	Jarnac	·	1.4 km	MPC · JPL
788798	2017 FJ_{129}	—	September 17, 2010	Mount Lemmon	Mount Lemmon Survey	·	1.3 km	MPC · JPL
788799	2017 FB_{131}	—	July 3, 2005	Mount Lemmon	Mount Lemmon Survey	·	1 km	MPC · JPL
788800	2017 FD_{132}	—	April 10, 2013	Haleakala	Pan-STARRS 1	·	900 m	MPC · JPL

== 788801–788900 ==
back to top

Designation			Discovery			Properties		Ref
Permanent	Provisional	Named after	Date	Site	Discoverer(s)	Category	Diam.	Ref
788801	2017 FN_{134}	—	March 26, 2017	Mount Lemmon	Mount Lemmon Survey	·	890 m	MPC · JPL
788802	2017 FD_{138}	—	April 17, 2013	Haleakala	Pan-STARRS 1	·	940 m	MPC · JPL
788803	2017 FJ_{140}	—	October 13, 2015	Mount Lemmon	Mount Lemmon Survey	·	970 m	MPC · JPL
788804	2017 FQ_{140}	—	February 21, 2017	Haleakala	Pan-STARRS 1	·	880 m	MPC · JPL
788805	2017 FY_{140}	—	January 22, 2006	Mount Lemmon	Mount Lemmon Survey	·	1.2 km	MPC · JPL
788806	2017 FB_{142}	—	July 7, 2014	Haleakala	Pan-STARRS 1	·	830 m	MPC · JPL
788807	2017 FW_{142}	—	March 27, 2017	Mount Lemmon	Mount Lemmon Survey	KON	1.7 km	MPC · JPL
788808	2017 FR_{143}	—	September 9, 2015	Haleakala	Pan-STARRS 1	(5)	770 m	MPC · JPL
788809	2017 FN_{145}	—	April 21, 2012	Mount Lemmon	Mount Lemmon Survey	·	1.8 km	MPC · JPL
788810	2017 FF_{147}	—	February 22, 2017	Mount Lemmon	Mount Lemmon Survey	·	2.4 km	MPC · JPL
788811	2017 FH_{147}	—	November 12, 2007	Mount Lemmon	Mount Lemmon Survey	·	820 m	MPC · JPL
788812	2017 FZ_{148}	—	March 13, 2012	Mount Lemmon	Mount Lemmon Survey	·	1.5 km	MPC · JPL
788813	2017 FH_{149}	—	August 15, 2009	Kitt Peak	Spacewatch	·	1.2 km	MPC · JPL
788814	2017 FJ_{149}	—	April 18, 2009	Mount Lemmon	Mount Lemmon Survey	KON	1.6 km	MPC · JPL
788815	2017 FU_{149}	—	March 21, 2017	Haleakala	Pan-STARRS 1	·	1.2 km	MPC · JPL
788816	2017 FP_{152}	—	November 9, 2009	Mount Lemmon	Mount Lemmon Survey	·	1.9 km	MPC · JPL
788817	2017 FG_{153}	—	March 27, 2017	Mount Lemmon	Mount Lemmon Survey	·	2.5 km	MPC · JPL
788818	2017 FK_{153}	—	October 14, 2014	Mount Lemmon	Mount Lemmon Survey	·	2.2 km	MPC · JPL
788819	2017 FH_{156}	—	January 4, 2016	Haleakala	Pan-STARRS 1	·	2.5 km	MPC · JPL
788820	2017 FK_{156}	—	January 4, 2016	Haleakala	Pan-STARRS 1	ADE	1.5 km	MPC · JPL
788821	2017 FH_{159}	—	March 18, 2013	Palomar	Palomar Transient Factory	·	1.6 km	MPC · JPL
788822	2017 FC_{162}	—	March 19, 2013	Haleakala	Pan-STARRS 1	MAR	610 m	MPC · JPL
788823	2017 FU_{163}	—	March 27, 2017	Mount Lemmon	Mount Lemmon Survey	·	1.4 km	MPC · JPL
788824	2017 FD_{165}	—	March 17, 2017	Mount Lemmon	Mount Lemmon Survey	·	840 m	MPC · JPL
788825	2017 FO_{169}	—	March 25, 2017	Mount Lemmon	Mount Lemmon Survey	BRG	1.2 km	MPC · JPL
788826	2017 FD_{171}	—	March 27, 2017	Haleakala	Pan-STARRS 1	·	1.3 km	MPC · JPL
788827	2017 FQ_{171}	—	March 27, 2017	Mount Lemmon	Mount Lemmon Survey	HNS	990 m	MPC · JPL
788828	2017 FV_{173}	—	March 21, 2017	Haleakala	Pan-STARRS 1	EOS	1.2 km	MPC · JPL
788829	2017 FK_{174}	—	March 19, 2017	Haleakala	Pan-STARRS 1	·	1.3 km	MPC · JPL
788830	2017 FO_{174}	—	March 27, 2017	Haleakala	Pan-STARRS 1	·	860 m	MPC · JPL
788831	2017 FT_{174}	—	March 21, 2017	Haleakala	Pan-STARRS 1	EOS	1.2 km	MPC · JPL
788832	2017 FY_{174}	—	March 20, 2017	Haleakala	Pan-STARRS 1	·	2.0 km	MPC · JPL
788833	2017 FA_{175}	—	March 19, 2017	Mount Lemmon	Mount Lemmon Survey	HNS	980 m	MPC · JPL
788834	2017 FV_{175}	—	March 19, 2017	Mount Lemmon	Mount Lemmon Survey	·	870 m	MPC · JPL
788835	2017 FW_{175}	—	March 30, 2017	Haleakala	Pan-STARRS 1	·	1.4 km	MPC · JPL
788836	2017 FB_{176}	—	March 29, 2017	Haleakala	Pan-STARRS 1	HOF	1.8 km	MPC · JPL
788837	2017 FX_{176}	—	March 22, 2017	Haleakala	Pan-STARRS 1	MRX	920 m	MPC · JPL
788838	2017 FY_{177}	—	March 21, 2017	Haleakala	Pan-STARRS 1	·	1.1 km	MPC · JPL
788839	2017 FZ_{178}	—	March 27, 2017	Haleakala	Pan-STARRS 1	·	850 m	MPC · JPL
788840	2017 FY_{179}	—	March 17, 2017	Mount Lemmon	Mount Lemmon Survey	(5)	830 m	MPC · JPL
788841	2017 FZ_{179}	—	March 19, 2017	Mount Lemmon	Mount Lemmon Survey	·	1.1 km	MPC · JPL
788842	2017 FL_{180}	—	March 17, 2017	Mount Lemmon	Mount Lemmon Survey	KOR	930 m	MPC · JPL
788843	2017 FP_{180}	—	March 19, 2017	Haleakala	Pan-STARRS 1	·	1.2 km	MPC · JPL
788844	2017 FS_{180}	—	March 18, 2017	Haleakala	Pan-STARRS 1	·	1.9 km	MPC · JPL
788845	2017 FU_{180}	—	March 25, 2017	Mount Lemmon	Mount Lemmon Survey	·	1.5 km	MPC · JPL
788846	2017 FV_{180}	—	March 22, 2017	Haleakala	Pan-STARRS 1	ADE	1.1 km	MPC · JPL
788847	2017 FY_{180}	—	March 17, 2017	Mount Lemmon	Mount Lemmon Survey	HNS	630 m	MPC · JPL
788848	2017 FE_{181}	—	March 26, 2017	Mount Lemmon	Mount Lemmon Survey	·	1.1 km	MPC · JPL
788849	2017 FF_{181}	—	March 21, 2017	Haleakala	Pan-STARRS 1	·	1.8 km	MPC · JPL
788850	2017 FG_{181}	—	March 25, 2017	Mount Lemmon	Mount Lemmon Survey	·	1.3 km	MPC · JPL
788851	2017 FN_{181}	—	March 25, 2017	Mount Lemmon	Mount Lemmon Survey	·	880 m	MPC · JPL
788852	2017 FM_{183}	—	March 19, 2017	Mount Lemmon	Mount Lemmon Survey	URS	2.5 km	MPC · JPL
788853	2017 FR_{186}	—	March 26, 2017	Mount Lemmon	Mount Lemmon Survey	·	1.9 km	MPC · JPL
788854	2017 FT_{186}	—	March 25, 2017	Mount Lemmon	Mount Lemmon Survey	ADE	1.1 km	MPC · JPL
788855	2017 FV_{186}	—	September 11, 2015	Haleakala	Pan-STARRS 1	(5)	850 m	MPC · JPL
788856	2017 FX_{186}	—	March 25, 2017	Mount Lemmon	Mount Lemmon Survey	ADE	1.3 km	MPC · JPL
788857	2017 FC_{187}	—	March 27, 2017	Haleakala	Pan-STARRS 1	·	1.1 km	MPC · JPL
788858	2017 FK_{187}	—	March 19, 2017	Mount Lemmon	Mount Lemmon Survey	ADE	1.8 km	MPC · JPL
788859	2017 FO_{187}	—	March 18, 2017	Haleakala	Pan-STARRS 1	EOS	1.5 km	MPC · JPL
788860	2017 FD_{188}	—	March 18, 2017	Haleakala	Pan-STARRS 1	·	910 m	MPC · JPL
788861	2017 FU_{188}	—	March 18, 2017	Mount Lemmon	Mount Lemmon Survey	·	760 m	MPC · JPL
788862	2017 FB_{189}	—	March 21, 2017	Mount Lemmon	Mount Lemmon Survey	·	810 m	MPC · JPL
788863	2017 FK_{189}	—	March 21, 2017	Haleakala	Pan-STARRS 1	·	2.1 km	MPC · JPL
788864	2017 FM_{189}	—	March 23, 2017	Haleakala	Pan-STARRS 1	ADE	1.4 km	MPC · JPL
788865	2017 FN_{189}	—	March 21, 2017	Haleakala	Pan-STARRS 1	·	1.1 km	MPC · JPL
788866	2017 FG_{190}	—	March 20, 2017	Haleakala	Pan-STARRS 1	EUN	930 m	MPC · JPL
788867	2017 FN_{191}	—	March 29, 2017	Haleakala	Pan-STARRS 1	AGN	810 m	MPC · JPL
788868	2017 FH_{193}	—	March 25, 2017	Haleakala	Pan-STARRS 1	·	1.0 km	MPC · JPL
788869	2017 FM_{195}	—	March 25, 2017	Mount Lemmon	Mount Lemmon Survey	·	1.0 km	MPC · JPL
788870	2017 FO_{195}	—	March 27, 2017	Haleakala	Pan-STARRS 1	·	1.2 km	MPC · JPL
788871	2017 FW_{195}	—	March 19, 2017	Haleakala	Pan-STARRS 1	·	670 m	MPC · JPL
788872	2017 FO_{196}	—	March 29, 2017	Haleakala	Pan-STARRS 1	·	680 m	MPC · JPL
788873	2017 FV_{196}	—	March 20, 2017	Haleakala	Pan-STARRS 1	·	1.5 km	MPC · JPL
788874	2017 FT_{197}	—	March 20, 2017	Haleakala	Pan-STARRS 1	·	1.4 km	MPC · JPL
788875	2017 FU_{197}	—	March 25, 2017	Mount Lemmon	Mount Lemmon Survey	·	1.2 km	MPC · JPL
788876	2017 FE_{199}	—	February 25, 2011	Mount Lemmon	Mount Lemmon Survey	·	2.0 km	MPC · JPL
788877	2017 FN_{199}	—	August 20, 2014	Haleakala	Pan-STARRS 1	(5)	810 m	MPC · JPL
788878	2017 FT_{201}	—	March 21, 2017	Haleakala	Pan-STARRS 1	·	1.3 km	MPC · JPL
788879	2017 FH_{203}	—	March 25, 2017	Mount Lemmon	Mount Lemmon Survey	·	2.1 km	MPC · JPL
788880	2017 FV_{204}	—	March 19, 2017	Haleakala	Pan-STARRS 1	THM	1.5 km	MPC · JPL
788881	2017 FD_{208}	—	March 20, 2017	Mount Lemmon	Mount Lemmon Survey	·	1.6 km	MPC · JPL
788882	2017 FR_{209}	—	March 21, 2017	Haleakala	Pan-STARRS 1	·	1.4 km	MPC · JPL
788883	2017 FV_{211}	—	March 17, 2017	Mount Lemmon	Mount Lemmon Survey	·	1.3 km	MPC · JPL
788884	2017 FL_{213}	—	December 8, 2015	Mount Lemmon	Mount Lemmon Survey	·	1.3 km	MPC · JPL
788885	2017 FP_{213}	—	March 28, 2017	Haleakala	Pan-STARRS 1	·	1.0 km	MPC · JPL
788886	2017 FJ_{218}	—	March 18, 2017	Mount Lemmon	Mount Lemmon Survey	·	2.2 km	MPC · JPL
788887	2017 FK_{220}	—	March 18, 2017	Haleakala	Pan-STARRS 1	·	1.5 km	MPC · JPL
788888	2017 FU_{223}	—	February 25, 2011	Mount Lemmon	Mount Lemmon Survey	·	2.3 km	MPC · JPL
788889	2017 FB_{224}	—	March 21, 2017	Haleakala	Pan-STARRS 1	·	1.2 km	MPC · JPL
788890 Garafía	2017 FC_{224}	Garafía	March 28, 2017	La Palma	EURONEAR	KOR	1.0 km	MPC · JPL
788891	2017 FT_{224}	—	March 25, 2017	Haleakala	Pan-STARRS 1	·	1.3 km	MPC · JPL
788892	2017 FD_{226}	—	March 26, 2017	Mount Lemmon	Mount Lemmon Survey	·	1.1 km	MPC · JPL
788893	2017 GF_{3}	—	August 22, 2014	Haleakala	Pan-STARRS 1	(7744)	1.1 km	MPC · JPL
788894	2017 GP_{3}	—	April 2, 2017	Haleakala	Pan-STARRS 1	·	1.9 km	MPC · JPL
788895	2017 GK_{9}	—	December 6, 2015	Haleakala	Pan-STARRS 1	ADE	1.2 km	MPC · JPL
788896	2017 GB_{11}	—	April 3, 2017	Mount Lemmon	Mount Lemmon Survey	EUN	840 m	MPC · JPL
788897	2017 GC_{12}	—	April 6, 2017	Mount Lemmon	Mount Lemmon Survey	·	1.1 km	MPC · JPL
788898	2017 GX_{13}	—	April 4, 2017	Haleakala	Pan-STARRS 1	·	1.3 km	MPC · JPL
788899	2017 GU_{15}	—	April 1, 2017	Haleakala	Pan-STARRS 1	·	1.4 km	MPC · JPL
788900	2017 GB_{16}	—	April 3, 2017	Haleakala	Pan-STARRS 1	·	1.4 km	MPC · JPL

== 788901–789000 ==
back to top

Designation			Discovery			Properties		Ref
Permanent	Provisional	Named after	Date	Site	Discoverer(s)	Category	Diam.	Ref
788901	2017 GK_{16}	—	April 2, 2017	Haleakala	Pan-STARRS 1	·	1.4 km	MPC · JPL
788902	2017 GQ_{16}	—	April 4, 2017	Haleakala	Pan-STARRS 1	·	980 m	MPC · JPL
788903	2017 GS_{16}	—	April 4, 2017	Calar Alto-CASADO	Hellmich, S., Mottola, S.	·	730 m	MPC · JPL
788904	2017 GX_{16}	—	April 1, 2017	Haleakala	Pan-STARRS 1	EUN	920 m	MPC · JPL
788905	2017 GL_{17}	—	April 3, 2017	Haleakala	Pan-STARRS 1	·	1.1 km	MPC · JPL
788906	2017 GN_{19}	—	April 6, 2017	Mount Lemmon	Mount Lemmon Survey	·	1.2 km	MPC · JPL
788907	2017 GO_{19}	—	April 1, 2017	Haleakala	Pan-STARRS 1	·	980 m	MPC · JPL
788908	2017 GT_{19}	—	April 1, 2017	Haleakala	Pan-STARRS 1	·	1.3 km	MPC · JPL
788909	2017 GB_{20}	—	April 3, 2017	Haleakala	Pan-STARRS 1	·	1.3 km	MPC · JPL
788910	2017 GC_{20}	—	April 4, 2017	Haleakala	Pan-STARRS 1	·	950 m	MPC · JPL
788911	2017 GF_{20}	—	April 3, 2017	Kitt Peak	Spacewatch	·	760 m	MPC · JPL
788912	2017 GK_{20}	—	April 4, 2017	Haleakala	Pan-STARRS 1	·	1.0 km	MPC · JPL
788913	2017 GN_{20}	—	April 2, 2017	Haleakala	Pan-STARRS 1	·	1.1 km	MPC · JPL
788914	2017 GR_{20}	—	April 3, 2017	Mount Lemmon	Mount Lemmon Survey	·	1.0 km	MPC · JPL
788915	2017 GS_{20}	—	April 4, 2017	Haleakala	Pan-STARRS 1	·	1.6 km	MPC · JPL
788916	2017 GW_{20}	—	April 6, 2017	Haleakala	Pan-STARRS 1	EUN	830 m	MPC · JPL
788917	2017 GC_{21}	—	April 4, 2017	Haleakala	Pan-STARRS 1	·	940 m	MPC · JPL
788918	2017 GJ_{21}	—	April 3, 2017	Mount Lemmon	Mount Lemmon Survey	·	860 m	MPC · JPL
788919	2017 GN_{21}	—	April 3, 2017	Haleakala	Pan-STARRS 1	·	960 m	MPC · JPL
788920	2017 GO_{21}	—	April 6, 2017	Haleakala	Pan-STARRS 1	·	940 m	MPC · JPL
788921	2017 GQ_{21}	—	April 1, 2017	Haleakala	Pan-STARRS 1	·	1.1 km	MPC · JPL
788922	2017 GU_{21}	—	April 6, 2017	Haleakala	Pan-STARRS 1	BRG	1.1 km	MPC · JPL
788923	2017 GZ_{21}	—	April 1, 2017	Haleakala	Pan-STARRS 1	(5)	870 m	MPC · JPL
788924	2017 GJ_{23}	—	April 1, 2017	Haleakala	Pan-STARRS 1	·	810 m	MPC · JPL
788925	2017 GM_{23}	—	February 4, 2016	Haleakala	Pan-STARRS 1	·	2.3 km	MPC · JPL
788926	2017 GG_{24}	—	April 1, 2017	Haleakala	Pan-STARRS 1	·	1.1 km	MPC · JPL
788927	2017 GL_{24}	—	April 1, 2017	Haleakala	Pan-STARRS 1	HNS	990 m	MPC · JPL
788928	2017 GA_{29}	—	April 1, 2017	Haleakala	Pan-STARRS 1	·	2.3 km	MPC · JPL
788929	2017 GS_{30}	—	April 3, 2017	Haleakala	Pan-STARRS 1	·	1.0 km	MPC · JPL
788930	2017 GV_{30}	—	April 1, 2017	Haleakala	Pan-STARRS 1	·	2.6 km	MPC · JPL
788931	2017 GG_{33}	—	April 3, 2017	Haleakala	Pan-STARRS 1	HOF	2.0 km	MPC · JPL
788932	2017 HQ_{5}	—	October 27, 2006	Mount Lemmon	Mount Lemmon Survey	·	1.3 km	MPC · JPL
788933	2017 HZ_{11}	—	January 13, 2008	Kitt Peak	Spacewatch	·	1.0 km	MPC · JPL
788934	2017 HJ_{12}	—	September 1, 2013	Haleakala	Pan-STARRS 1	·	1.8 km	MPC · JPL
788935	2017 HU_{15}	—	April 19, 2017	Mount Lemmon	Mount Lemmon Survey	THM	2.1 km	MPC · JPL
788936	2017 HA_{16}	—	January 14, 2016	Mount Lemmon	Mount Lemmon Survey	·	2.0 km	MPC · JPL
788937	2017 HE_{21}	—	December 29, 2011	Mount Lemmon	Mount Lemmon Survey	·	1.0 km	MPC · JPL
788938	2017 HY_{21}	—	September 18, 2014	Haleakala	Pan-STARRS 1	·	990 m	MPC · JPL
788939	2017 HO_{27}	—	February 29, 2008	Mount Lemmon	Mount Lemmon Survey	·	990 m	MPC · JPL
788940	2017 HP_{28}	—	November 7, 2010	Mount Lemmon	Mount Lemmon Survey	·	1.4 km	MPC · JPL
788941	2017 HK_{30}	—	April 25, 2017	Haleakala	Pan-STARRS 1	·	1.1 km	MPC · JPL
788942	2017 HU_{30}	—	April 25, 2017	Haleakala	Pan-STARRS 1	·	1.1 km	MPC · JPL
788943	2017 HV_{30}	—	January 14, 2016	Haleakala	Pan-STARRS 1	·	1.3 km	MPC · JPL
788944	2017 HH_{31}	—	October 26, 2014	Mount Lemmon	Mount Lemmon Survey	·	1.3 km	MPC · JPL
788945	2017 HU_{34}	—	April 26, 2017	Haleakala	Pan-STARRS 1	·	900 m	MPC · JPL
788946	2017 HW_{34}	—	October 28, 2014	Haleakala	Pan-STARRS 1	·	1.1 km	MPC · JPL
788947	2017 HX_{37}	—	January 31, 2016	Haleakala	Pan-STARRS 1	KOR	930 m	MPC · JPL
788948	2017 HP_{38}	—	February 14, 2012	Haleakala	Pan-STARRS 1	·	1.0 km	MPC · JPL
788949	2017 HT_{39}	—	April 26, 2017	Haleakala	Pan-STARRS 1	·	1.2 km	MPC · JPL
788950	2017 HD_{41}	—	April 26, 2017	Haleakala	Pan-STARRS 1	·	1.5 km	MPC · JPL
788951	2017 HE_{41}	—	January 30, 2016	Mount Lemmon	Mount Lemmon Survey	AGN	950 m	MPC · JPL
788952	2017 HN_{41}	—	January 18, 2016	Mount Lemmon	Mount Lemmon Survey	·	1.6 km	MPC · JPL
788953	2017 HW_{41}	—	April 26, 2017	Haleakala	Pan-STARRS 1	·	1.1 km	MPC · JPL
788954	2017 HC_{43}	—	May 14, 2012	Haleakala	Pan-STARRS 1	·	1.3 km	MPC · JPL
788955	2017 HH_{44}	—	February 13, 2008	Kitt Peak	Spacewatch	·	1.1 km	MPC · JPL
788956	2017 HY_{44}	—	October 1, 2008	Kitt Peak	Spacewatch	·	2.1 km	MPC · JPL
788957	2017 HH_{48}	—	December 1, 2008	Kitt Peak	Spacewatch	·	2.4 km	MPC · JPL
788958	2017 HG_{53}	—	October 23, 2008	Kitt Peak	Spacewatch	·	2.0 km	MPC · JPL
788959	2017 HY_{58}	—	October 17, 2010	Mount Lemmon	Mount Lemmon Survey	·	1.1 km	MPC · JPL
788960	2017 HD_{65}	—	April 20, 2017	Mount Lemmon	Mount Lemmon Survey	ADE	1.4 km	MPC · JPL
788961	2017 HM_{65}	—	February 11, 2008	Kitt Peak	Spacewatch	MIS	1.8 km	MPC · JPL
788962	2017 HC_{66}	—	April 27, 2017	Haleakala	Pan-STARRS 1	·	1.4 km	MPC · JPL
788963	2017 HK_{68}	—	April 18, 2017	Mount Lemmon	Mount Lemmon Survey	·	1.4 km	MPC · JPL
788964	2017 HV_{68}	—	April 26, 2017	Haleakala	Pan-STARRS 1	·	1.1 km	MPC · JPL
788965	2017 HB_{69}	—	April 26, 2017	Haleakala	Pan-STARRS 1	·	2.0 km	MPC · JPL
788966	2017 HQ_{70}	—	April 17, 2017	Cerro Paranal	Gaia Ground Based Optical Tracking	·	1.5 km	MPC · JPL
788967	2017 HN_{72}	—	April 27, 2017	Haleakala	Pan-STARRS 1	AGN	830 m	MPC · JPL
788968	2017 HO_{72}	—	April 27, 2017	Haleakala	Pan-STARRS 1	MAR	720 m	MPC · JPL
788969	2017 HB_{73}	—	April 19, 2017	Mount Lemmon	Mount Lemmon Survey	·	2.4 km	MPC · JPL
788970	2017 HE_{73}	—	April 20, 2017	Haleakala	Pan-STARRS 1	·	1.1 km	MPC · JPL
788971	2017 HS_{73}	—	April 25, 2017	Haleakala	Pan-STARRS 1	·	1.2 km	MPC · JPL
788972	2017 HC_{74}	—	April 16, 2017	Mount Lemmon	Mount Lemmon Survey	·	1.2 km	MPC · JPL
788973	2017 HZ_{74}	—	April 26, 2017	Haleakala	Pan-STARRS 1	EUN	730 m	MPC · JPL
788974	2017 HE_{75}	—	April 19, 2017	Haleakala	Pan-STARRS 1	·	1.3 km	MPC · JPL
788975	2017 HL_{75}	—	April 27, 2017	Haleakala	Pan-STARRS 1	EUN	790 m	MPC · JPL
788976	2017 HW_{75}	—	April 27, 2017	Haleakala	Pan-STARRS 1	(5)	830 m	MPC · JPL
788977	2017 HB_{76}	—	June 7, 2013	Haleakala	Pan-STARRS 1	·	850 m	MPC · JPL
788978	2017 HD_{76}	—	April 20, 2017	Haleakala	Pan-STARRS 1	HNS	860 m	MPC · JPL
788979	2017 HN_{76}	—	April 27, 2017	Haleakala	Pan-STARRS 1	·	890 m	MPC · JPL
788980	2017 HR_{76}	—	April 19, 2017	Mount Lemmon	Mount Lemmon Survey	·	1.0 km	MPC · JPL
788981	2017 HB_{78}	—	April 20, 2017	Haleakala	Pan-STARRS 1	·	920 m	MPC · JPL
788982	2017 HL_{78}	—	April 26, 2017	Haleakala	Pan-STARRS 1	·	850 m	MPC · JPL
788983	2017 HM_{78}	—	April 26, 2017	Haleakala	Pan-STARRS 1	MIS	1.7 km	MPC · JPL
788984	2017 HC_{80}	—	September 18, 2014	Haleakala	Pan-STARRS 1	·	1.0 km	MPC · JPL
788985	2017 HK_{80}	—	April 26, 2017	Haleakala	Pan-STARRS 1	·	1.3 km	MPC · JPL
788986	2017 HU_{80}	—	April 26, 2017	Haleakala	Pan-STARRS 1	KON	1.5 km	MPC · JPL
788987	2017 HH_{81}	—	April 19, 2017	Haleakala	Pan-STARRS 1	·	2.2 km	MPC · JPL
788988	2017 HX_{82}	—	April 20, 2017	Haleakala	Pan-STARRS 1	HOF	1.8 km	MPC · JPL
788989	2017 HN_{84}	—	April 20, 2017	Haleakala	Pan-STARRS 1	KOR	910 m	MPC · JPL
788990	2017 HY_{84}	—	April 26, 2017	Haleakala	Pan-STARRS 1	EOS	1.4 km	MPC · JPL
788991	2017 HN_{86}	—	April 25, 2017	Haleakala	Pan-STARRS 1	·	1.2 km	MPC · JPL
788992	2017 HU_{86}	—	April 20, 2017	Haleakala	Pan-STARRS 1	·	1.4 km	MPC · JPL
788993	2017 HR_{87}	—	April 26, 2017	Haleakala	Pan-STARRS 1	TIR	1.9 km	MPC · JPL
788994	2017 HJ_{89}	—	April 26, 2017	Haleakala	Pan-STARRS 1	·	1.4 km	MPC · JPL
788995	2017 HK_{89}	—	April 26, 2017	Haleakala	Pan-STARRS 1	·	1.2 km	MPC · JPL
788996	2017 HF_{91}	—	May 2, 2006	Mount Lemmon	Mount Lemmon Survey	·	1.9 km	MPC · JPL
788997	2017 HL_{92}	—	April 28, 2017	Haleakala	Pan-STARRS 1	·	2.2 km	MPC · JPL
788998	2017 HW_{92}	—	February 11, 2016	Haleakala	Pan-STARRS 1	·	2.0 km	MPC · JPL
788999	2017 HY_{93}	—	April 27, 2017	Haleakala	Pan-STARRS 1	·	1.7 km	MPC · JPL
789000	2017 HD_{95}	—	April 26, 2017	Haleakala	Pan-STARRS 1	·	1.7 km	MPC · JPL

back to top

== Meaning of names ==
As minor planet discoveries are confirmed, they are given a permanent number by the IAU's Minor Planet Center (MPC), and the discoverers can then submit names for them, following the IAU's naming conventions. The list below concerns those minor planets in the specified number-range that have received names, and explains the meanings of those names.

Official naming citations of newly named small Solar System bodies are approved and published in a bulletin by IAU's Working Group for Small Bodies Nomenclature (WGSBN). Before May 2021, citations were published in MPC's Minor Planet Circulars for many decades. Recent citations can also be found on the JPL Small-Body Database (SBDB). Until his death in 2016, German astronomer Lutz D. Schmadel compiled these citations into the Dictionary of Minor Planet Names (DMP) and regularly updated the collection.

Based on Paul Herget's The Names of the Minor Planets, Schmadel also researched the unclear origin of numerous asteroids, most of which had been named prior to World War II. This article incorporates text from this source, which is in the public domain: SBDB New namings may only be added to this list below after official publication as the preannouncement of names is condemned. The WGSBN publishes a comprehensive guideline for the naming rules of non-cometary small Solar System bodies.

Named minor planet	Provisional	This minor planet was named for...	Ref · Catalog
788153 Trabia	2016 PT_{297}	Trabia, Sicilian municipality near Palermo.	IAU · 788153
788501 Gabi	2017 BF_{119}	Gabriele Hildegard Koschny, nickname Gabi, is the wife of the second discoverer.	IAU · 788501
788573 Isaiah	2017 BO_{207}	Isaiah Orson Rankin, the son of the discoverer.	IAU · 788573
788764 Alexandrumironov	2017 FZ_{83}	Alexandru Mironov, Romanian science journalist.	IAU · 788764
788890 Garafía	2017 FC_{224}	Garafía, the largest but least populated municipality of La Palma, Canary Islands.	IAU · 788890
