= DK19 =

DK19 may refer to:

== Minor planets ==
- 2000 DK_{19}, a minor planet discovered in 2000 listed at List of minor planets: 103001–104000
- 2001 DK_{19}, a minor planet discovered in 2001 listed at List of minor planets: 77001–78000
- 2002 DK_{19}, a minor planet discovered in 2002 listed at List of minor planets: 405001–406000
- 2003 DK_{19}, a minor planet discovered in 2003 listed at List of minor planets: 114001–115000
- 2004 DK_{19}, a minor planet discovered in 2004 listed at List of minor planets: 211001–212000
- 2006 DK_{19}, a minor planet discovered in 2006 listed at List of minor planets: 812001–813000
- 2007 DK_{19}, a minor planet discovered in 2007 listed at List of minor planets: 161001–162000
- 2008 DK_{19}, a minor planet discovered in 2008 listed at List of minor planets: 294001–295000
- 2009 DK_{19}, a minor planet discovered in 2009 listed at List of minor planets: 509001–510000
- 2010 DK_{19}, a minor planet discovered in 2010 listed at List of minor planets discovered using the WISE spacecraft
- 2014 DK_{19}, a minor planet discovered in 2014 listed at List of minor planets: 472001–473000
- 2015 DK_{19}, a minor planet discovered in 2015 listed at List of minor planets: 654001–655000
- 2017 DK_{19}, a minor planet discovered in 2017 listed at List of minor planets: 788001–789000

== Other ==
- National road 19 (Poland), a road in Poland abbreviated as DK19
- Dinesh Kartik, an Indian professional cricketer
