= List of minor planets: 654001–655000 =

The following is a partial list of minor planets, running from minor-planet number 654001 through 655000, inclusive. The primary data for this and other partial lists is based on JPL's "Small-Body Orbital Elements" and data available from the Minor Planet Center. Critical list information is also provided by the MPC, unless otherwise specified from Lowell Observatory. A detailed description of the table's columns and additional sources are given on the main page including a complete list of every page in this series, and a statistical break-up on the dynamical classification of minor planets.

Also see the summary list of all named bodies in numerical and alphabetical order, and the corresponding naming citations for the number range of this particular list. New namings may only be added to this list after official publication, as the preannouncement of names is condemned by the Working Group for Small Bodies Nomenclature of the International Astronomical Union.

Near-Earth obj.	MBA (inner)	MBA (outer)	Centaur
Mars-crosser	MBA (middle)	Jupiter trojan	Trans-Neptunian obj.
Unclassified

== 654001–654100 ==
Designation			Discovery			Properties		Ref
Permanent	Provisional	Named after	Date	Site	Discoverer(s)	Category	Diam.	Ref
654001	2014 WR_{224}	—	November 18, 2014	Haleakala	Pan-STARRS 1	·	1.0 km	MPC · JPL
654002	2014 WX_{224}	—	November 18, 2014	Haleakala	Pan-STARRS 1	·	1.1 km	MPC · JPL
654003	2014 WV_{225}	—	November 18, 2014	Haleakala	Pan-STARRS 1	·	1.3 km	MPC · JPL
654004	2014 WF_{229}	—	November 18, 2014	Haleakala	Pan-STARRS 1	·	1.2 km	MPC · JPL
654005	2014 WO_{229}	—	November 4, 2005	Kitt Peak	Spacewatch	·	1.3 km	MPC · JPL
654006	2014 WA_{230}	—	November 18, 2014	Haleakala	Pan-STARRS 1	EUN	1.0 km	MPC · JPL
654007	2014 WM_{232}	—	October 22, 2003	Kitt Peak	Spacewatch	·	1.7 km	MPC · JPL
654008	2014 WK_{233}	—	January 10, 2007	Kitt Peak	Spacewatch	·	1.2 km	MPC · JPL
654009	2014 WR_{233}	—	September 14, 2007	Catalina	CSS	·	760 m	MPC · JPL
654010	2014 WE_{234}	—	November 2, 2010	Mount Lemmon	Mount Lemmon Survey	(5)	840 m	MPC · JPL
654011	2014 WA_{235}	—	January 30, 2004	Kitt Peak	Spacewatch	·	1.4 km	MPC · JPL
654012	2014 WF_{236}	—	November 20, 2014	Mount Lemmon	Mount Lemmon Survey	·	1.7 km	MPC · JPL
654013	2014 WO_{236}	—	October 25, 2014	Mount Lemmon	Mount Lemmon Survey	(5)	770 m	MPC · JPL
654014	2014 WX_{236}	—	October 5, 2014	Mount Lemmon	Mount Lemmon Survey	·	1.2 km	MPC · JPL
654015	2014 WR_{240}	—	September 20, 2014	Haleakala	Pan-STARRS 1	WIT	650 m	MPC · JPL
654016	2014 WO_{243}	—	December 1, 2005	Mount Lemmon	Mount Lemmon Survey	EOS	1.9 km	MPC · JPL
654017	2014 WQ_{245}	—	January 17, 2008	Mount Lemmon	Mount Lemmon Survey	·	1.4 km	MPC · JPL
654018	2014 WS_{249}	—	March 14, 2012	Haleakala	Pan-STARRS 1	·	1.2 km	MPC · JPL
654019	2014 WF_{252}	—	February 6, 2005	Bergisch Gladbach	W. Bickel	EOS	1.6 km	MPC · JPL
654020	2014 WC_{257}	—	April 5, 2011	Mount Lemmon	Mount Lemmon Survey	·	1.4 km	MPC · JPL
654021	2014 WH_{260}	—	December 13, 2010	Mount Lemmon	Mount Lemmon Survey	·	1.2 km	MPC · JPL
654022	2014 WM_{264}	—	July 15, 2013	Haleakala	Pan-STARRS 1	·	1.6 km	MPC · JPL
654023	2014 WV_{265}	—	September 25, 2009	Kitt Peak	Spacewatch	·	1.4 km	MPC · JPL
654024	2014 WP_{277}	—	September 23, 2008	Kitt Peak	Spacewatch	·	2.8 km	MPC · JPL
654025	2014 WA_{280}	—	November 21, 2014	Haleakala	Pan-STARRS 1	HNS	840 m	MPC · JPL
654026	2014 WX_{280}	—	November 21, 2014	Haleakala	Pan-STARRS 1	·	2.0 km	MPC · JPL
654027	2014 WE_{285}	—	November 21, 2014	Haleakala	Pan-STARRS 1	PAD	1.1 km	MPC · JPL
654028	2014 WW_{286}	—	October 16, 2014	Kitt Peak	Spacewatch	·	2.9 km	MPC · JPL
654029	2014 WU_{288}	—	November 11, 2001	Apache Point	SDSS	·	1.2 km	MPC · JPL
654030	2014 WL_{291}	—	August 27, 2009	Kitt Peak	Spacewatch	DOR	1.5 km	MPC · JPL
654031	2014 WX_{292}	—	October 2, 2014	Haleakala	Pan-STARRS 1	EUN	1.0 km	MPC · JPL
654032	2014 WN_{309}	—	October 31, 2010	Mount Lemmon	Mount Lemmon Survey	·	1.1 km	MPC · JPL
654033	2014 WQ_{310}	—	October 27, 2005	Kitt Peak	Spacewatch	·	1.3 km	MPC · JPL
654034	2014 WT_{310}	—	October 4, 2014	Mount Lemmon	Mount Lemmon Survey	·	1.3 km	MPC · JPL
654035	2014 WK_{319}	—	July 28, 2005	Palomar	NEAT	·	1.5 km	MPC · JPL
654036	2014 WP_{321}	—	November 7, 2007	Catalina	CSS	·	640 m	MPC · JPL
654037	2014 WQ_{322}	—	October 28, 2014	Mount Lemmon	Mount Lemmon Survey	·	1.7 km	MPC · JPL
654038	2014 WF_{323}	—	November 22, 2014	Haleakala	Pan-STARRS 1	·	1.1 km	MPC · JPL
654039	2014 WJ_{324}	—	September 15, 2009	Kitt Peak	Spacewatch	·	1.5 km	MPC · JPL
654040	2014 WT_{324}	—	October 29, 2014	Haleakala	Pan-STARRS 1	HNS	860 m	MPC · JPL
654041	2014 WD_{330}	—	November 22, 2014	Haleakala	Pan-STARRS 1	·	1.2 km	MPC · JPL
654042	2014 WT_{330}	—	November 22, 2014	Haleakala	Pan-STARRS 1	EUN	1 km	MPC · JPL
654043	2014 WX_{330}	—	April 16, 2012	Haleakala	Pan-STARRS 1	·	1.3 km	MPC · JPL
654044	2014 WO_{332}	—	March 28, 2003	Kitt Peak	Spacewatch	·	3.1 km	MPC · JPL
654045	2014 WB_{335}	—	August 31, 2014	Haleakala	Pan-STARRS 1	·	1.6 km	MPC · JPL
654046	2014 WN_{338}	—	February 7, 2011	Mount Lemmon	Mount Lemmon Survey	·	2.3 km	MPC · JPL
654047	2014 WV_{338}	—	May 12, 2013	Haleakala	Pan-STARRS 1	·	1.6 km	MPC · JPL
654048	2014 WJ_{339}	—	October 29, 2014	Haleakala	Pan-STARRS 1	·	1.4 km	MPC · JPL
654049	2014 WF_{341}	—	September 18, 2014	Haleakala	Pan-STARRS 1	·	2.1 km	MPC · JPL
654050	2014 WC_{342}	—	August 31, 2014	Haleakala	Pan-STARRS 1	·	1.0 km	MPC · JPL
654051	2014 WB_{344}	—	November 22, 2014	Haleakala	Pan-STARRS 1	·	1.4 km	MPC · JPL
654052	2014 WK_{347}	—	March 27, 2008	Mount Lemmon	Mount Lemmon Survey	·	1.3 km	MPC · JPL
654053	2014 WO_{348}	—	January 27, 2012	Kitt Peak	Spacewatch	·	560 m	MPC · JPL
654054	2014 WC_{349}	—	November 22, 2014	Haleakala	Pan-STARRS 1	MAR	870 m	MPC · JPL
654055	2014 WK_{349}	—	September 8, 1996	Kitt Peak	Spacewatch	·	710 m	MPC · JPL
654056	2014 WU_{354}	—	November 23, 2014	Haleakala	Pan-STARRS 1	(194)	1.8 km	MPC · JPL
654057	2014 WG_{359}	—	February 1, 2003	Apache Point	SDSS Collaboration	·	1.4 km	MPC · JPL
654058	2014 WB_{372}	—	November 22, 2014	Mount Lemmon	Mount Lemmon Survey	·	1.2 km	MPC · JPL
654059	2014 WS_{376}	—	November 22, 2014	Mount Lemmon	Mount Lemmon Survey	·	1.3 km	MPC · JPL
654060	2014 WM_{379}	—	November 22, 2014	Haleakala	Pan-STARRS 1	·	1.0 km	MPC · JPL
654061	2014 WX_{379}	—	December 1, 2006	Mount Lemmon	Mount Lemmon Survey	·	1.2 km	MPC · JPL
654062	2014 WZ_{380}	—	October 28, 2014	Mount Lemmon	Mount Lemmon Survey	EUN	1.2 km	MPC · JPL
654063	2014 WJ_{382}	—	April 2, 2011	Mount Lemmon	Mount Lemmon Survey	·	1.5 km	MPC · JPL
654064	2014 WB_{386}	—	January 24, 2011	Mount Lemmon	Mount Lemmon Survey	·	1.3 km	MPC · JPL
654065	2014 WO_{394}	—	October 22, 2014	Catalina	CSS	·	1.6 km	MPC · JPL
654066	2014 WQ_{394}	—	October 28, 2014	Haleakala	Pan-STARRS 1	JUN	1 km	MPC · JPL
654067	2014 WG_{395}	—	December 24, 2006	Kitt Peak	Spacewatch	·	1.3 km	MPC · JPL
654068	2014 WK_{395}	—	October 28, 2014	Haleakala	Pan-STARRS 1	·	700 m	MPC · JPL
654069	2014 WU_{395}	—	December 13, 2010	Mount Lemmon	Mount Lemmon Survey	·	1.3 km	MPC · JPL
654070	2014 WY_{395}	—	November 25, 2014	Haleakala	Pan-STARRS 1	ADE	1.5 km	MPC · JPL
654071	2014 WP_{397}	—	September 23, 2014	Haleakala	Pan-STARRS 1	·	1.1 km	MPC · JPL
654072	2014 WD_{399}	—	November 25, 2014	Mount Lemmon	Mount Lemmon Survey	EUN	870 m	MPC · JPL
654073	2014 WJ_{402}	—	November 6, 2005	Kitt Peak	Spacewatch	AEO	740 m	MPC · JPL
654074	2014 WN_{403}	—	November 26, 2014	Kitt Peak	Spacewatch	·	1.3 km	MPC · JPL
654075	2014 WZ_{403}	—	September 23, 2001	Kitt Peak	Spacewatch	·	960 m	MPC · JPL
654076	2014 WH_{404}	—	November 26, 2014	Haleakala	Pan-STARRS 1	·	1.0 km	MPC · JPL
654077	2014 WK_{405}	—	April 15, 2008	Mount Lemmon	Mount Lemmon Survey	·	1.1 km	MPC · JPL
654078	2014 WQ_{405}	—	January 30, 2011	Mount Lemmon	Mount Lemmon Survey	·	1.1 km	MPC · JPL
654079	2014 WR_{406}	—	November 26, 2014	Haleakala	Pan-STARRS 1	·	1.4 km	MPC · JPL
654080	2014 WQ_{408}	—	November 11, 2007	Mount Lemmon	Mount Lemmon Survey	·	950 m	MPC · JPL
654081	2014 WT_{410}	—	September 29, 2009	Mount Lemmon	Mount Lemmon Survey	·	1.5 km	MPC · JPL
654082	2014 WS_{411}	—	November 26, 2014	Haleakala	Pan-STARRS 1	·	1.1 km	MPC · JPL
654083	2014 WE_{426}	—	September 16, 2009	Mount Lemmon	Mount Lemmon Survey	·	1.5 km	MPC · JPL
654084	2014 WJ_{430}	—	November 27, 2014	Mount Lemmon	Mount Lemmon Survey	·	1.6 km	MPC · JPL
654085	2014 WW_{434}	—	September 4, 2010	Mount Lemmon	Mount Lemmon Survey	·	940 m	MPC · JPL
654086	2014 WX_{438}	—	November 27, 2014	Mount Lemmon	Mount Lemmon Survey	·	1.1 km	MPC · JPL
654087	2014 WP_{443}	—	October 31, 2014	Mount Lemmon	Mount Lemmon Survey	EOS	1.6 km	MPC · JPL
654088	2014 WL_{444}	—	March 12, 2007	Kitt Peak	Spacewatch	AGN	980 m	MPC · JPL
654089	2014 WY_{445}	—	January 8, 2011	Mount Lemmon	Mount Lemmon Survey	·	1.4 km	MPC · JPL
654090	2014 WE_{447}	—	September 17, 2003	Kitt Peak	Spacewatch	·	760 m	MPC · JPL
654091	2014 WO_{450}	—	March 13, 2012	Mount Lemmon	Mount Lemmon Survey	·	1.0 km	MPC · JPL
654092	2014 WQ_{451}	—	November 24, 2014	Kitt Peak	Spacewatch	·	2.6 km	MPC · JPL
654093	2014 WG_{453}	—	September 4, 2014	Haleakala	Pan-STARRS 1	·	1.1 km	MPC · JPL
654094	2014 WQ_{453}	—	October 12, 2007	Lulin	LUSS	·	910 m	MPC · JPL
654095	2014 WK_{454}	—	September 1, 2005	Kitt Peak	Spacewatch	·	1.2 km	MPC · JPL
654096	2014 WU_{455}	—	January 27, 2007	Mount Lemmon	Mount Lemmon Survey	·	1.2 km	MPC · JPL
654097	2014 WC_{456}	—	July 11, 2005	Mount Lemmon	Mount Lemmon Survey	EUN	1.0 km	MPC · JPL
654098	2014 WP_{458}	—	November 25, 2005	Kitt Peak	Spacewatch	NEM	1.4 km	MPC · JPL
654099	2014 WK_{462}	—	November 17, 2014	Haleakala	Pan-STARRS 1	·	1.9 km	MPC · JPL
654100	2014 WK_{464}	—	November 27, 2014	Haleakala	Pan-STARRS 1	·	1.5 km	MPC · JPL

== 654101–654200 ==
back to top

Designation			Discovery			Properties		Ref
Permanent	Provisional	Named after	Date	Site	Discoverer(s)	Category	Diam.	Ref
654101	2014 WY_{464}	—	September 4, 2014	Haleakala	Pan-STARRS 1	PHO	710 m	MPC · JPL
654102	2014 WG_{472}	—	March 28, 2009	Mount Lemmon	Mount Lemmon Survey	·	680 m	MPC · JPL
654103	2014 WE_{474}	—	November 22, 2006	Kitt Peak	Spacewatch	·	860 m	MPC · JPL
654104	2014 WA_{475}	—	November 6, 2005	Kitt Peak	Spacewatch	·	1.2 km	MPC · JPL
654105	2014 WF_{475}	—	November 20, 2014	Mount Lemmon	Mount Lemmon Survey	(5)	970 m	MPC · JPL
654106	2014 WW_{475}	—	January 11, 2011	Mount Lemmon	Mount Lemmon Survey	EUN	860 m	MPC · JPL
654107	2014 WH_{478}	—	March 27, 2007	Siding Spring	SSS	·	2.3 km	MPC · JPL
654108	2014 WV_{493}	—	November 14, 2013	Mount Lemmon	Mount Lemmon Survey	·	2.4 km	MPC · JPL
654109	2014 WQ_{496}	—	December 26, 2009	Kitt Peak	Spacewatch	·	2.3 km	MPC · JPL
654110	2014 WL_{498}	—	August 31, 2014	Haleakala	Pan-STARRS 1	·	1.2 km	MPC · JPL
654111	2014 WT_{499}	—	June 13, 2005	Mount Lemmon	Mount Lemmon Survey	JUN	920 m	MPC · JPL
654112	2014 WK_{500}	—	August 31, 2003	Haleakala	NEAT	·	1.3 km	MPC · JPL
654113	2014 WP_{501}	—	October 14, 2014	Kitt Peak	Spacewatch	·	2.0 km	MPC · JPL
654114	2014 WE_{502}	—	January 9, 2002	Kitt Peak	Spacewatch	·	1.4 km	MPC · JPL
654115	2014 WP_{502}	—	September 26, 2006	Catalina	CSS	T_{j} (2.94)	3.2 km	MPC · JPL
654116	2014 WH_{503}	—	September 4, 2014	Haleakala	Pan-STARRS 1	DOR	1.8 km	MPC · JPL
654117	2014 WN_{504}	—	October 27, 2005	Kitt Peak	Spacewatch	T_{j} (2.98) · 4:3	4.0 km	MPC · JPL
654118	2014 WJ_{507}	—	November 17, 2007	Catalina	CSS	·	760 m	MPC · JPL
654119	2014 WM_{507}	—	January 17, 2007	Catalina	CSS	·	1.6 km	MPC · JPL
654120	2014 WZ_{515}	—	November 21, 2014	Haleakala	Pan-STARRS 1	EUN	870 m	MPC · JPL
654121	2014 WU_{516}	—	November 17, 2014	Haleakala	Pan-STARRS 1	·	850 m	MPC · JPL
654122	2014 WG_{523}	—	October 25, 2005	Mount Lemmon	Mount Lemmon Survey	·	1.2 km	MPC · JPL
654123	2014 WA_{525}	—	November 20, 2014	Mount Lemmon	Mount Lemmon Survey	·	1.2 km	MPC · JPL
654124	2014 WC_{525}	—	November 20, 2014	Haleakala	Pan-STARRS 1	·	1.2 km	MPC · JPL
654125	2014 WL_{526}	—	November 21, 2014	Haleakala	Pan-STARRS 1	·	1.2 km	MPC · JPL
654126	2014 WG_{528}	—	August 28, 2013	Mount Lemmon	Mount Lemmon Survey	·	1.3 km	MPC · JPL
654127	2014 WR_{531}	—	November 26, 2014	Haleakala	Pan-STARRS 1	·	1.3 km	MPC · JPL
654128	2014 WU_{532}	—	November 29, 2005	Mount Lemmon	Mount Lemmon Survey	·	1.2 km	MPC · JPL
654129	2014 WE_{534}	—	November 29, 2014	Haleakala	Pan-STARRS 1	BRA	1.4 km	MPC · JPL
654130	2014 WJ_{534}	—	March 30, 2011	Mount Lemmon	Mount Lemmon Survey	MRX	850 m	MPC · JPL
654131	2014 WR_{534}	—	November 30, 2014	Haleakala	Pan-STARRS 1	MAR	770 m	MPC · JPL
654132	2014 WB_{549}	—	November 27, 2014	Haleakala	Pan-STARRS 1	·	1.0 km	MPC · JPL
654133	2014 WZ_{554}	—	November 25, 2014	Haleakala	Pan-STARRS 1	·	1.0 km	MPC · JPL
654134	2014 WJ_{567}	—	November 26, 2014	Haleakala	Pan-STARRS 1	·	1.5 km	MPC · JPL
654135	2014 WW_{567}	—	November 26, 2014	Haleakala	Pan-STARRS 1	·	1.5 km	MPC · JPL
654136	2014 WZ_{567}	—	November 22, 2014	Haleakala	Pan-STARRS 1	·	1.1 km	MPC · JPL
654137	2014 WH_{568}	—	November 20, 2014	Mount Lemmon	Mount Lemmon Survey	·	1.5 km	MPC · JPL
654138	2014 WQ_{568}	—	November 24, 2014	Haleakala	Pan-STARRS 1	·	1.5 km	MPC · JPL
654139	2014 WT_{568}	—	November 20, 2014	Haleakala	Pan-STARRS 1	·	1.1 km	MPC · JPL
654140	2014 WL_{572}	—	November 22, 2014	Haleakala	Pan-STARRS 1	·	1.3 km	MPC · JPL
654141	2014 WY_{592}	—	November 23, 2014	Haleakala	Pan-STARRS 1	WIT	720 m	MPC · JPL
654142	2014 WZ_{593}	—	November 20, 2014	Haleakala	Pan-STARRS 1	·	1.4 km	MPC · JPL
654143	2014 WC_{608}	—	November 29, 2014	Haleakala	Pan-STARRS 1	·	1.8 km	MPC · JPL
654144	2014 WZ_{610}	—	November 29, 2014	Mount Lemmon	Mount Lemmon Survey	·	1.5 km	MPC · JPL
654145	2014 XA	—	December 11, 2010	Mayhill-ISON	L. Elenin	·	1.8 km	MPC · JPL
654146	2014 XL_{1}	—	December 1, 2014	Haleakala	Pan-STARRS 1	·	1.2 km	MPC · JPL
654147	2014 XM_{1}	—	November 17, 2014	Haleakala	Pan-STARRS 1	EUN	1.3 km	MPC · JPL
654148	2014 XY_{1}	—	September 30, 2005	Catalina	CSS	ADE	1.6 km	MPC · JPL
654149	2014 XL_{3}	—	July 31, 2001	Palomar	NEAT	(116763)	1.9 km	MPC · JPL
654150	2014 XB_{4}	—	September 7, 2014	Haleakala	Pan-STARRS 1	·	3.4 km	MPC · JPL
654151	2014 XV_{7}	—	October 18, 2014	Mount Lemmon	Mount Lemmon Survey	BAR	1.3 km	MPC · JPL
654152	2014 XO_{9}	—	October 3, 2014	Mount Lemmon	Mount Lemmon Survey	·	740 m	MPC · JPL
654153	2014 XA_{10}	—	December 1, 2010	Kitt Peak	Spacewatch	·	1.2 km	MPC · JPL
654154	2014 XC_{10}	—	October 15, 2014	Catalina	CSS	·	1.9 km	MPC · JPL
654155	2014 XL_{11}	—	November 19, 2003	Kitt Peak	Spacewatch	MAS	640 m	MPC · JPL
654156	2014 XM_{11}	—	December 15, 2001	Socorro	LINEAR	·	1.3 km	MPC · JPL
654157	2014 XD_{12}	—	November 27, 2014	Haleakala	Pan-STARRS 1	·	1.1 km	MPC · JPL
654158	2014 XF_{12}	—	November 17, 2014	Haleakala	Pan-STARRS 1	AGN	850 m	MPC · JPL
654159	2014 XB_{15}	—	November 26, 2014	Haleakala	Pan-STARRS 1	·	1.1 km	MPC · JPL
654160	2014 XB_{18}	—	December 10, 2014	Mount Lemmon	Mount Lemmon Survey	HNS	900 m	MPC · JPL
654161	2014 XB_{19}	—	November 9, 2009	Mount Lemmon	Mount Lemmon Survey	·	1.9 km	MPC · JPL
654162	2014 XX_{20}	—	November 19, 2014	Mount Lemmon	Mount Lemmon Survey	·	1.2 km	MPC · JPL
654163	2014 XY_{20}	—	January 21, 2012	Catalina	CSS	·	850 m	MPC · JPL
654164	2014 XA_{28}	—	November 17, 2014	Haleakala	Pan-STARRS 1	AEO	760 m	MPC · JPL
654165	2014 XL_{28}	—	November 26, 2014	Catalina	CSS	EUN	950 m	MPC · JPL
654166	2014 XL_{29}	—	February 18, 2008	Mount Lemmon	Mount Lemmon Survey	T_{j} (2.98) · 3:2	5.3 km	MPC · JPL
654167	2014 XM_{30}	—	September 30, 2005	Mount Lemmon	Mount Lemmon Survey	·	1.3 km	MPC · JPL
654168	2014 XB_{39}	—	August 5, 2005	Palomar	NEAT	·	1.6 km	MPC · JPL
654169	2014 XX_{41}	—	December 15, 2014	Mount Lemmon	Mount Lemmon Survey	·	1.9 km	MPC · JPL
654170	2014 XJ_{42}	—	December 2, 2014	Haleakala	Pan-STARRS 1	·	1.3 km	MPC · JPL
654171	2014 XT_{46}	—	December 3, 2014	Haleakala	Pan-STARRS 1	·	1.2 km	MPC · JPL
654172	2014 XP_{49}	—	December 20, 2001	Apache Point	SDSS Collaboration	·	1.4 km	MPC · JPL
654173	2014 XS_{49}	—	December 3, 2014	Haleakala	Pan-STARRS 1	EUN	910 m	MPC · JPL
654174	2014 XR_{50}	—	December 15, 2014	Mount Lemmon	Mount Lemmon Survey	·	1.3 km	MPC · JPL
654175	2014 YV_{1}	—	February 10, 2011	Mount Lemmon	Mount Lemmon Survey	·	1.8 km	MPC · JPL
654176	2014 YU_{5}	—	March 4, 2011	Catalina	CSS	EUN	1.4 km	MPC · JPL
654177	2014 YZ_{7}	—	November 25, 2005	Catalina	CSS	·	1.8 km	MPC · JPL
654178	2014 YO_{8}	—	June 28, 2014	Mount Lemmon	Mount Lemmon Survey	·	1.5 km	MPC · JPL
654179	2014 YG_{11}	—	December 29, 2005	Socorro	LINEAR	·	1.7 km	MPC · JPL
654180	2014 YC_{20}	—	October 4, 2014	Haleakala	Pan-STARRS 1	HNS	1.3 km	MPC · JPL
654181	2014 YH_{20}	—	January 29, 2003	Apache Point	SDSS Collaboration	·	1.1 km	MPC · JPL
654182	2014 YM_{24}	—	January 28, 2007	Kitt Peak	Spacewatch	(5)	1.4 km	MPC · JPL
654183	2014 YD_{25}	—	December 3, 2014	Haleakala	Pan-STARRS 1	EUN	1.2 km	MPC · JPL
654184	2014 YQ_{31}	—	December 1, 2014	Haleakala	Pan-STARRS 1	·	1.4 km	MPC · JPL
654185	2014 YT_{31}	—	March 11, 2007	Kitt Peak	Spacewatch	·	1.3 km	MPC · JPL
654186	2014 YK_{32}	—	November 5, 2005	Catalina	CSS	·	1.7 km	MPC · JPL
654187	2014 YG_{36}	—	June 9, 2012	Mount Lemmon	Mount Lemmon Survey	·	1.5 km	MPC · JPL
654188	2014 YT_{45}	—	January 25, 2003	Palomar	NEAT	EUN	1.7 km	MPC · JPL
654189	2014 YY_{45}	—	January 1, 2008	Catalina	CSS	·	1.0 km	MPC · JPL
654190	2014 YY_{49}	—	September 23, 2008	Mount Lemmon	Mount Lemmon Survey	centaur	32 km	MPC · JPL
654191	2014 YN_{56}	—	December 21, 2014	Haleakala	Pan-STARRS 1	EUN	1.0 km	MPC · JPL
654192	2014 YK_{60}	—	June 13, 2012	Haleakala	Pan-STARRS 1	·	1.5 km	MPC · JPL
654193	2014 YO_{62}	—	September 4, 2008	Kitt Peak	Spacewatch	·	1.6 km	MPC · JPL
654194	2014 YZ_{63}	—	December 29, 2014	Haleakala	Pan-STARRS 1	·	1.0 km	MPC · JPL
654195	2014 YH_{64}	—	December 29, 2014	Mount Lemmon	Mount Lemmon Survey	·	740 m	MPC · JPL
654196	2014 YO_{76}	—	December 21, 2014	Haleakala	Pan-STARRS 1	·	1.5 km	MPC · JPL
654197	2014 YR_{76}	—	December 16, 2014	Haleakala	Pan-STARRS 1	·	1.5 km	MPC · JPL
654198	2014 YX_{76}	—	December 16, 2014	Haleakala	Pan-STARRS 1	EUN	920 m	MPC · JPL
654199	2014 YO_{78}	—	December 20, 2014	Kitt Peak	Spacewatch	·	1.5 km	MPC · JPL
654200	2015 AT	—	January 28, 2011	Kitt Peak	Spacewatch	·	1.2 km	MPC · JPL

== 654201–654300 ==
back to top

Designation			Discovery			Properties		Ref
Permanent	Provisional	Named after	Date	Site	Discoverer(s)	Category	Diam.	Ref
654201	2015 AB_{4}	—	December 10, 2010	Mount Lemmon	Mount Lemmon Survey	·	1.3 km	MPC · JPL
654202	2015 AG_{6}	—	August 31, 2013	Haleakala	Pan-STARRS 1	HNS	1.0 km	MPC · JPL
654203	2015 AN_{6}	—	October 30, 2014	Mount Lemmon	Mount Lemmon Survey	526	1.6 km	MPC · JPL
654204	2015 AQ_{12}	—	January 11, 2015	Haleakala	Pan-STARRS 1	·	1.4 km	MPC · JPL
654205	2015 AA_{14}	—	September 10, 2004	Kitt Peak	Spacewatch	·	1.6 km	MPC · JPL
654206	2015 AH_{16}	—	March 15, 2007	Kitt Peak	Spacewatch	ADE	2.1 km	MPC · JPL
654207	2015 AM_{17}	—	July 17, 2004	7300	W. K. Y. Yeung	·	1.9 km	MPC · JPL
654208	2015 AV_{18}	—	August 29, 2005	Kitt Peak	Spacewatch	·	1.3 km	MPC · JPL
654209	2015 AD_{20}	—	January 17, 2007	Kitt Peak	Spacewatch	·	1.2 km	MPC · JPL
654210	2015 AS_{20}	—	November 20, 2014	Haleakala	Pan-STARRS 1	EUN	870 m	MPC · JPL
654211	2015 AL_{22}	—	July 16, 2013	Haleakala	Pan-STARRS 1	·	1.6 km	MPC · JPL
654212	2015 AC_{24}	—	January 11, 2011	Kitt Peak	Spacewatch	·	1.6 km	MPC · JPL
654213	2015 AE_{28}	—	August 28, 2013	Catalina	CSS	·	1.5 km	MPC · JPL
654214	2015 AK_{31}	—	January 2, 2009	Kitt Peak	Spacewatch	·	2.7 km	MPC · JPL
654215	2015 AP_{32}	—	February 6, 2002	Kitt Peak	Spacewatch	·	1.2 km	MPC · JPL
654216	2015 AT_{40}	—	November 18, 2009	Kitt Peak	Spacewatch	·	2.0 km	MPC · JPL
654217	2015 AE_{42}	—	February 9, 2011	Mount Lemmon	Mount Lemmon Survey	·	2.1 km	MPC · JPL
654218	2015 AF_{42}	—	August 15, 2013	Haleakala	Pan-STARRS 1	EOS	1.5 km	MPC · JPL
654219	2015 AV_{46}	—	August 25, 2005	Palomar	NEAT	JUN	1.1 km	MPC · JPL
654220	2015 AC_{47}	—	December 8, 2005	Kitt Peak	Spacewatch	·	1.9 km	MPC · JPL
654221	2015 AG_{52}	—	March 14, 2011	Mount Lemmon	Mount Lemmon Survey	AGN	870 m	MPC · JPL
654222	2015 AS_{58}	—	February 25, 2011	Mount Lemmon	Mount Lemmon Survey	(11882)	1.4 km	MPC · JPL
654223	2015 AU_{58}	—	September 14, 2013	Mount Lemmon	Mount Lemmon Survey	·	1.4 km	MPC · JPL
654224	2015 AN_{63}	—	October 26, 2014	Mount Lemmon	Mount Lemmon Survey	·	2.3 km	MPC · JPL
654225	2015 AP_{64}	—	August 10, 2007	Kitt Peak	Spacewatch	·	720 m	MPC · JPL
654226	2015 AT_{64}	—	July 29, 2008	Mount Lemmon	Mount Lemmon Survey	·	1.7 km	MPC · JPL
654227	2015 AA_{65}	—	February 5, 2011	Haleakala	Pan-STARRS 1	·	1.1 km	MPC · JPL
654228	2015 AJ_{65}	—	July 2, 2013	Haleakala	Pan-STARRS 1	·	1.5 km	MPC · JPL
654229	2015 AL_{65}	—	September 15, 2007	Anderson Mesa	LONEOS	·	550 m	MPC · JPL
654230	2015 AM_{65}	—	August 9, 2013	Haleakala	Pan-STARRS 1	·	1.1 km	MPC · JPL
654231	2015 AX_{66}	—	March 13, 2007	Mount Lemmon	Mount Lemmon Survey	·	1.6 km	MPC · JPL
654232	2015 AE_{70}	—	December 1, 2008	Mount Lemmon	Mount Lemmon Survey	·	2.4 km	MPC · JPL
654233	2015 AR_{70}	—	January 13, 2015	Haleakala	Pan-STARRS 1	·	1.5 km	MPC · JPL
654234	2015 AP_{73}	—	December 21, 2014	Haleakala	Pan-STARRS 1	·	1.3 km	MPC · JPL
654235	2015 AL_{76}	—	December 21, 2014	Haleakala	Pan-STARRS 1	·	1.2 km	MPC · JPL
654236	2015 AT_{76}	—	February 25, 2006	Mount Lemmon	Mount Lemmon Survey	HOF	1.9 km	MPC · JPL
654237	2015 AX_{77}	—	January 13, 2015	Haleakala	Pan-STARRS 1	·	1.6 km	MPC · JPL
654238	2015 AD_{82}	—	August 9, 2013	Haleakala	Pan-STARRS 1	ADE	1.2 km	MPC · JPL
654239	2015 AM_{83}	—	January 22, 2006	Mount Lemmon	Mount Lemmon Survey	·	1.0 km	MPC · JPL
654240	2015 AN_{85}	—	October 18, 2009	Mount Lemmon	Mount Lemmon Survey	·	1.2 km	MPC · JPL
654241	2015 AT_{86}	—	January 22, 2006	Mount Lemmon	Mount Lemmon Survey	·	1.2 km	MPC · JPL
654242	2015 AN_{88}	—	August 14, 2013	Haleakala	Pan-STARRS 1	·	1.4 km	MPC · JPL
654243	2015 AE_{93}	—	October 3, 2013	Mount Lemmon	Mount Lemmon Survey	KOR	1.1 km	MPC · JPL
654244	2015 AM_{99}	—	January 14, 2015	Haleakala	Pan-STARRS 1	·	1.6 km	MPC · JPL
654245	2015 AR_{101}	—	January 14, 2015	Haleakala	Pan-STARRS 1	·	1.6 km	MPC · JPL
654246	2015 AP_{105}	—	July 20, 2013	Haleakala	Pan-STARRS 1	THM	2.5 km	MPC · JPL
654247	2015 AY_{109}	—	February 26, 2011	Mount Lemmon	Mount Lemmon Survey	·	1.5 km	MPC · JPL
654248	2015 AS_{116}	—	May 29, 2012	Mount Lemmon	Mount Lemmon Survey	·	1.5 km	MPC · JPL
654249	2015 AB_{117}	—	October 2, 2013	Mount Lemmon	Mount Lemmon Survey	KOR	1 km	MPC · JPL
654250	2015 AL_{119}	—	January 14, 2015	Haleakala	Pan-STARRS 1	·	1.2 km	MPC · JPL
654251	2015 AV_{119}	—	November 30, 2005	Mount Lemmon	Mount Lemmon Survey	·	1.5 km	MPC · JPL
654252	2015 AS_{121}	—	January 7, 2006	Kitt Peak	Spacewatch	·	1.2 km	MPC · JPL
654253	2015 AG_{126}	—	January 14, 2015	Haleakala	Pan-STARRS 1	KOR	940 m	MPC · JPL
654254	2015 AY_{127}	—	December 21, 2014	Haleakala	Pan-STARRS 1	·	1.3 km	MPC · JPL
654255	2015 AV_{129}	—	January 14, 2015	Haleakala	Pan-STARRS 1	GEF	990 m	MPC · JPL
654256	2015 AC_{130}	—	October 1, 2013	Mount Lemmon	Mount Lemmon Survey	KOR	950 m	MPC · JPL
654257	2015 AE_{136}	—	July 1, 2013	Haleakala	Pan-STARRS 1	·	850 m	MPC · JPL
654258	2015 AY_{138}	—	December 21, 2014	Haleakala	Pan-STARRS 1	·	2.2 km	MPC · JPL
654259	2015 AH_{140}	—	September 1, 2013	Mountain Meadows	Skillman, D.	GEF	1.3 km	MPC · JPL
654260	2015 AT_{145}	—	January 14, 2015	Haleakala	Pan-STARRS 1	KOR	1.1 km	MPC · JPL
654261	2015 AX_{148}	—	January 14, 2015	Haleakala	Pan-STARRS 1	·	1.5 km	MPC · JPL
654262	2015 AG_{149}	—	August 15, 2013	Haleakala	Pan-STARRS 1	·	1.2 km	MPC · JPL
654263	2015 AH_{149}	—	February 7, 2006	Kitt Peak	Spacewatch	·	1.4 km	MPC · JPL
654264	2015 AY_{150}	—	April 15, 2012	Haleakala	Pan-STARRS 1	·	2.0 km	MPC · JPL
654265	2015 AC_{151}	—	December 21, 2014	Haleakala	Pan-STARRS 1	EUN	830 m	MPC · JPL
654266	2015 AJ_{151}	—	April 22, 2007	Mount Lemmon	Mount Lemmon Survey	·	1.3 km	MPC · JPL
654267	2015 AD_{152}	—	October 23, 2013	Mount Lemmon	Mount Lemmon Survey	·	1.4 km	MPC · JPL
654268	2015 AL_{155}	—	January 14, 2015	Haleakala	Pan-STARRS 1	KOR	1.0 km	MPC · JPL
654269	2015 AU_{156}	—	January 14, 2015	Haleakala	Pan-STARRS 1	AGN	940 m	MPC · JPL
654270	2015 AQ_{158}	—	January 14, 2015	Haleakala	Pan-STARRS 1	·	1.3 km	MPC · JPL
654271	2015 AK_{159}	—	October 2, 2013	Haleakala	Pan-STARRS 1	AST	1.3 km	MPC · JPL
654272	2015 AM_{164}	—	April 13, 2010	WISE	WISE	·	1.7 km	MPC · JPL
654273	2015 AL_{169}	—	January 14, 2015	Haleakala	Pan-STARRS 1	·	1.3 km	MPC · JPL
654274	2015 AW_{171}	—	December 7, 2005	Kitt Peak	Spacewatch	·	2.6 km	MPC · JPL
654275	2015 AV_{172}	—	October 1, 2013	Mount Lemmon	Mount Lemmon Survey	AGN	870 m	MPC · JPL
654276	2015 AY_{178}	—	November 10, 2009	Kitt Peak	Spacewatch	AGN	1.0 km	MPC · JPL
654277	2015 AT_{179}	—	November 8, 2013	Mount Lemmon	Mount Lemmon Survey	·	1.4 km	MPC · JPL
654278	2015 AU_{181}	—	January 14, 2015	Haleakala	Pan-STARRS 1	GEF	1.2 km	MPC · JPL
654279	2015 AY_{185}	—	October 3, 2013	Haleakala	Pan-STARRS 1	·	1.4 km	MPC · JPL
654280	2015 AT_{192}	—	December 21, 2014	Haleakala	Pan-STARRS 1	·	1.6 km	MPC · JPL
654281	2015 AE_{193}	—	January 27, 2006	Mount Lemmon	Mount Lemmon Survey	·	1.8 km	MPC · JPL
654282	2015 AK_{198}	—	December 3, 2014	Haleakala	Pan-STARRS 1	·	1.8 km	MPC · JPL
654283	2015 AT_{198}	—	January 14, 2015	Haleakala	Pan-STARRS 1	·	1.4 km	MPC · JPL
654284	2015 AO_{200}	—	December 26, 2014	Haleakala	Pan-STARRS 1	·	1.9 km	MPC · JPL
654285	2015 AN_{201}	—	September 16, 2009	Mount Lemmon	Mount Lemmon Survey	PAD	1.2 km	MPC · JPL
654286	2015 AA_{202}	—	September 3, 2013	Haleakala	Pan-STARRS 1	·	1.4 km	MPC · JPL
654287	2015 AM_{204}	—	December 1, 2005	Kitt Peak	Spacewatch	·	1.5 km	MPC · JPL
654288	2015 AJ_{205}	—	January 15, 2015	Mount Lemmon	Mount Lemmon Survey	PAD	1.3 km	MPC · JPL
654289	2015 AA_{207}	—	December 13, 2006	Mount Lemmon	Mount Lemmon Survey	·	1.1 km	MPC · JPL
654290	2015 AY_{207}	—	November 8, 2007	Mount Lemmon	Mount Lemmon Survey	·	870 m	MPC · JPL
654291	2015 AL_{209}	—	September 14, 2007	Mount Lemmon	Mount Lemmon Survey	·	480 m	MPC · JPL
654292	2015 AP_{212}	—	September 18, 2009	Kitt Peak	Spacewatch	EUN	970 m	MPC · JPL
654293	2015 AE_{214}	—	September 25, 2009	Kitt Peak	Spacewatch	·	1.4 km	MPC · JPL
654294	2015 AS_{214}	—	December 12, 2014	Haleakala	Pan-STARRS 1	·	1.2 km	MPC · JPL
654295	2015 AA_{215}	—	October 10, 2005	Kitt Peak	Spacewatch	·	1.0 km	MPC · JPL
654296	2015 AV_{219}	—	September 12, 2004	Kitt Peak	Spacewatch	·	1.3 km	MPC · JPL
654297	2015 AW_{222}	—	December 1, 2005	Mount Lemmon	Mount Lemmon Survey	·	1.5 km	MPC · JPL
654298	2015 AG_{223}	—	October 1, 2005	Mount Lemmon	Mount Lemmon Survey	·	1.1 km	MPC · JPL
654299	2015 AS_{223}	—	February 9, 2003	Palomar	NEAT	·	1.7 km	MPC · JPL
654300	2015 AK_{225}	—	September 30, 2008	Catalina	CSS	·	2.1 km	MPC · JPL

== 654301–654400 ==
back to top

Designation			Discovery			Properties		Ref
Permanent	Provisional	Named after	Date	Site	Discoverer(s)	Category	Diam.	Ref
654301	2015 AM_{230}	—	March 2, 2011	Mount Lemmon	Mount Lemmon Survey	·	940 m	MPC · JPL
654302	2015 AB_{232}	—	August 24, 2008	Kitt Peak	Spacewatch	·	1.7 km	MPC · JPL
654303	2015 AH_{233}	—	October 14, 2013	Mount Lemmon	Mount Lemmon Survey	HOF	2.1 km	MPC · JPL
654304	2015 AV_{234}	—	January 15, 2015	Haleakala	Pan-STARRS 1	·	890 m	MPC · JPL
654305	2015 AU_{235}	—	April 15, 2008	Mount Lemmon	Mount Lemmon Survey	EUN	1 km	MPC · JPL
654306	2015 AL_{240}	—	January 15, 2015	Haleakala	Pan-STARRS 1	·	1.7 km	MPC · JPL
654307	2015 AV_{246}	—	March 16, 2007	Kitt Peak	Spacewatch	·	1.0 km	MPC · JPL
654308	2015 AY_{248}	—	April 26, 2009	Siding Spring	SSS	·	880 m	MPC · JPL
654309	2015 AV_{250}	—	March 29, 2011	Mount Lemmon	Mount Lemmon Survey	·	1.6 km	MPC · JPL
654310	2015 AV_{251}	—	September 12, 2013	Mount Lemmon	Mount Lemmon Survey	AGN	850 m	MPC · JPL
654311	2015 AC_{253}	—	September 19, 2006	Catalina	CSS	NYS	940 m	MPC · JPL
654312	2015 AK_{253}	—	March 6, 2006	Kitt Peak	Spacewatch	·	1.6 km	MPC · JPL
654313	2015 AS_{254}	—	September 6, 2008	Mount Lemmon	Mount Lemmon Survey	·	1.4 km	MPC · JPL
654314	2015 AA_{257}	—	November 8, 2008	Mount Lemmon	Mount Lemmon Survey	·	2.6 km	MPC · JPL
654315	2015 AW_{263}	—	January 15, 2015	Haleakala	Pan-STARRS 1	·	2.3 km	MPC · JPL
654316	2015 AJ_{264}	—	September 12, 2013	Mount Lemmon	Mount Lemmon Survey	·	2.5 km	MPC · JPL
654317	2015 AJ_{268}	—	September 24, 2013	Mount Lemmon	Mount Lemmon Survey	KOR	950 m	MPC · JPL
654318	2015 AE_{269}	—	July 30, 2005	Palomar	NEAT	·	1.2 km	MPC · JPL
654319	2015 AM_{271}	—	January 13, 2015	Haleakala	Pan-STARRS 1	BRA	1.3 km	MPC · JPL
654320	2015 AO_{274}	—	November 10, 2004	Kitt Peak	Spacewatch	·	1.5 km	MPC · JPL
654321	2015 AJ_{276}	—	December 21, 2008	Catalina	CSS	LUT	4.6 km	MPC · JPL
654322	2015 AW_{277}	—	August 1, 2009	Bergisch Gladbach	W. Bickel	·	990 m	MPC · JPL
654323	2015 AL_{279}	—	March 21, 2001	Kitt Peak	Spacewatch	KOR	1.2 km	MPC · JPL
654324	2015 AX_{284}	—	August 30, 2013	Haleakala	Pan-STARRS 1	EUN	1.1 km	MPC · JPL
654325	2015 AJ_{291}	—	September 21, 2008	Mount Lemmon	Mount Lemmon Survey	·	1.7 km	MPC · JPL
654326	2015 AA_{292}	—	September 7, 2004	St. Véran	St. Veran	·	1.8 km	MPC · JPL
654327	2015 AY_{298}	—	January 11, 2015	Haleakala	Pan-STARRS 1	·	1.5 km	MPC · JPL
654328	2015 AE_{300}	—	January 15, 2015	Haleakala	Pan-STARRS 1	·	2.0 km	MPC · JPL
654329	2015 BK_{6}	—	December 21, 2014	Mount Lemmon	Mount Lemmon Survey	·	1.7 km	MPC · JPL
654330	2015 BH_{10}	—	October 16, 1977	Palomar	C. J. van Houten, I. van Houten-Groeneveld, T. Gehrels	·	1.3 km	MPC · JPL
654331	2015 BK_{10}	—	September 25, 2007	Mount Lemmon	Mount Lemmon Survey	·	690 m	MPC · JPL
654332	2015 BP_{14}	—	March 16, 2007	Kitt Peak	Spacewatch	·	1.9 km	MPC · JPL
654333	2015 BH_{17}	—	December 26, 2014	Haleakala	Pan-STARRS 1	JUN	730 m	MPC · JPL
654334	2015 BO_{20}	—	January 16, 2015	Haleakala	Pan-STARRS 1	·	2.6 km	MPC · JPL
654335	2015 BQ_{24}	—	January 23, 2006	Mount Lemmon	Mount Lemmon Survey	·	1.4 km	MPC · JPL
654336	2015 BH_{25}	—	January 16, 2015	Haleakala	Pan-STARRS 1	·	1.6 km	MPC · JPL
654337	2015 BF_{27}	—	October 15, 2004	Mount Lemmon	Mount Lemmon Survey	·	1.6 km	MPC · JPL
654338	2015 BN_{27}	—	March 5, 2006	Kitt Peak	Spacewatch	·	1.8 km	MPC · JPL
654339	2015 BR_{27}	—	December 3, 2005	Mauna Kea	A. Boattini	·	2.0 km	MPC · JPL
654340	2015 BK_{28}	—	November 8, 2009	Mount Lemmon	Mount Lemmon Survey	·	1.5 km	MPC · JPL
654341	2015 BN_{28}	—	January 16, 2015	Haleakala	Pan-STARRS 1	·	1.4 km	MPC · JPL
654342	2015 BK_{29}	—	January 16, 2015	Haleakala	Pan-STARRS 1	·	1.5 km	MPC · JPL
654343	2015 BU_{30}	—	January 16, 2015	Haleakala	Pan-STARRS 1	·	1.6 km	MPC · JPL
654344	2015 BD_{39}	—	January 4, 2006	Mount Lemmon	Mount Lemmon Survey	·	1.9 km	MPC · JPL
654345	2015 BT_{41}	—	December 29, 2014	Haleakala	Pan-STARRS 1	·	1.1 km	MPC · JPL
654346	2015 BM_{45}	—	December 24, 2006	Kitt Peak	Spacewatch	MAR	970 m	MPC · JPL
654347	2015 BL_{50}	—	July 2, 2013	Haleakala	Pan-STARRS 1	TIN	750 m	MPC · JPL
654348	2015 BJ_{53}	—	November 24, 2008	Kitt Peak	Spacewatch	·	2.5 km	MPC · JPL
654349	2015 BN_{56}	—	September 30, 2005	Mount Lemmon	Mount Lemmon Survey	·	1.0 km	MPC · JPL
654350	2015 BL_{57}	—	January 22, 2006	Mount Lemmon	Mount Lemmon Survey	·	1.6 km	MPC · JPL
654351	2015 BU_{57}	—	January 17, 2015	Haleakala	Pan-STARRS 1	·	1.4 km	MPC · JPL
654352	2015 BW_{57}	—	November 25, 2005	Kitt Peak	Spacewatch	·	1.2 km	MPC · JPL
654353	2015 BX_{57}	—	June 9, 2012	Mount Lemmon	Mount Lemmon Survey	·	2.3 km	MPC · JPL
654354	2015 BA_{58}	—	April 19, 2007	Mount Lemmon	Mount Lemmon Survey	HOF	2.9 km	MPC · JPL
654355	2015 BL_{62}	—	September 17, 2004	Kitt Peak	Spacewatch	·	1.6 km	MPC · JPL
654356	2015 BV_{64}	—	November 28, 2005	Mount Lemmon	Mount Lemmon Survey	·	1.3 km	MPC · JPL
654357	2015 BF_{66}	—	March 25, 2012	Kitt Peak	Spacewatch	·	580 m	MPC · JPL
654358	2015 BC_{71}	—	November 24, 2009	Kitt Peak	Spacewatch	·	1.5 km	MPC · JPL
654359	2015 BG_{72}	—	October 13, 2004	Vail-Jarnac	Jarnac	·	2.3 km	MPC · JPL
654360	2015 BT_{73}	—	November 9, 2009	Kitt Peak	Spacewatch	·	1.4 km	MPC · JPL
654361	2015 BJ_{77}	—	January 17, 2015	Haleakala	Pan-STARRS 1	·	1.6 km	MPC · JPL
654362	2015 BQ_{77}	—	February 28, 2008	Mount Lemmon	Mount Lemmon Survey	·	820 m	MPC · JPL
654363	2015 BR_{80}	—	December 21, 2014	Haleakala	Pan-STARRS 1	·	1.4 km	MPC · JPL
654364	2015 BE_{88}	—	October 5, 2013	Haleakala	Pan-STARRS 1	·	1.7 km	MPC · JPL
654365	2015 BP_{89}	—	January 18, 2015	Mount Lemmon	Mount Lemmon Survey	·	1.8 km	MPC · JPL
654366	2015 BA_{90}	—	November 20, 2009	Kitt Peak	Spacewatch	·	2.0 km	MPC · JPL
654367	2015 BE_{94}	—	July 14, 2013	Haleakala	Pan-STARRS 1	EUN	1.0 km	MPC · JPL
654368	2015 BG_{96}	—	December 15, 2014	Mount Lemmon	Mount Lemmon Survey	MAS	580 m	MPC · JPL
654369	2015 BU_{97}	—	May 28, 2008	Kitt Peak	Spacewatch	·	1.5 km	MPC · JPL
654370	2015 BK_{98}	—	January 23, 2006	Mount Lemmon	Mount Lemmon Survey	·	1.2 km	MPC · JPL
654371	2015 BX_{100}	—	January 26, 2006	Mount Lemmon	Mount Lemmon Survey	AEO	990 m	MPC · JPL
654372	2015 BR_{101}	—	January 28, 2006	Kitt Peak	Spacewatch	·	1.8 km	MPC · JPL
654373	2015 BO_{102}	—	November 4, 2004	Kitt Peak	Spacewatch	·	1.6 km	MPC · JPL
654374	2015 BB_{104}	—	November 1, 1999	Kitt Peak	Spacewatch	·	1.6 km	MPC · JPL
654375	2015 BR_{104}	—	January 16, 2015	Haleakala	Pan-STARRS 1	·	1.3 km	MPC · JPL
654376	2015 BE_{106}	—	October 20, 2008	Mount Lemmon	Mount Lemmon Survey	KOR	920 m	MPC · JPL
654377	2015 BL_{106}	—	December 29, 2005	Kitt Peak	Spacewatch	JUN	820 m	MPC · JPL
654378	2015 BF_{107}	—	December 30, 2008	Catalina	CSS	·	2.9 km	MPC · JPL
654379	2015 BC_{108}	—	December 5, 2010	Mount Lemmon	Mount Lemmon Survey	·	1.1 km	MPC · JPL
654380	2015 BA_{110}	—	October 24, 2005	Mauna Kea	A. Boattini	·	1.8 km	MPC · JPL
654381	2015 BN_{113}	—	October 18, 2009	Mount Lemmon	Mount Lemmon Survey	·	1.2 km	MPC · JPL
654382	2015 BN_{114}	—	February 2, 2006	Mount Lemmon	Mount Lemmon Survey	·	1.7 km	MPC · JPL
654383	2015 BY_{114}	—	December 18, 2007	Mount Lemmon	Mount Lemmon Survey	(2076)	760 m	MPC · JPL
654384	2015 BG_{115}	—	January 17, 2015	Mount Lemmon	Mount Lemmon Survey	·	1.5 km	MPC · JPL
654385	2015 BM_{118}	—	October 20, 2008	Kitt Peak	Spacewatch	EOS	1.8 km	MPC · JPL
654386	2015 BC_{120}	—	November 16, 2009	Mount Lemmon	Mount Lemmon Survey	·	1.3 km	MPC · JPL
654387	2015 BH_{120}	—	October 3, 2013	Haleakala	Pan-STARRS 1	HOF	1.9 km	MPC · JPL
654388	2015 BC_{121}	—	October 11, 2004	Kitt Peak	Deep Ecliptic Survey	MRX	790 m	MPC · JPL
654389	2015 BD_{127}	—	January 17, 2015	Haleakala	Pan-STARRS 1	·	1.6 km	MPC · JPL
654390	2015 BS_{127}	—	March 9, 2008	Kitt Peak	Spacewatch	·	790 m	MPC · JPL
654391	2015 BA_{130}	—	October 12, 2013	Kitt Peak	Spacewatch	·	1.5 km	MPC · JPL
654392	2015 BL_{132}	—	October 25, 2013	Mount Lemmon	Mount Lemmon Survey	KOR	1.1 km	MPC · JPL
654393	2015 BK_{137}	—	January 17, 2015	Haleakala	Pan-STARRS 1	·	1.5 km	MPC · JPL
654394	2015 BL_{137}	—	November 10, 2009	Kitt Peak	Spacewatch	·	1.5 km	MPC · JPL
654395	2015 BA_{138}	—	January 17, 2015	Haleakala	Pan-STARRS 1	·	1.6 km	MPC · JPL
654396	2015 BX_{138}	—	April 3, 2011	Haleakala	Pan-STARRS 1	·	1.5 km	MPC · JPL
654397	2015 BN_{142}	—	October 12, 2013	Mount Lemmon	Mount Lemmon Survey	·	1.4 km	MPC · JPL
654398	2015 BU_{145}	—	October 3, 2013	Haleakala	Pan-STARRS 1	AGN	1.1 km	MPC · JPL
654399	2015 BX_{148}	—	January 17, 2015	Haleakala	Pan-STARRS 1	·	1.3 km	MPC · JPL
654400	2015 BH_{149}	—	September 26, 2013	Catalina	CSS	·	1.9 km	MPC · JPL

== 654401–654500 ==
back to top

Designation			Discovery			Properties		Ref
Permanent	Provisional	Named after	Date	Site	Discoverer(s)	Category	Diam.	Ref
654401	2015 BJ_{149}	—	November 4, 2004	Kitt Peak	Spacewatch	HOF	2.5 km	MPC · JPL
654402	2015 BP_{149}	—	March 25, 2011	Haleakala	Pan-STARRS 1	·	1.9 km	MPC · JPL
654403	2015 BZ_{149}	—	April 4, 2011	Kitt Peak	Spacewatch	AGN	1.4 km	MPC · JPL
654404	2015 BE_{150}	—	October 4, 2013	Mount Lemmon	Mount Lemmon Survey	AGN	1.0 km	MPC · JPL
654405	2015 BP_{153}	—	August 14, 2013	Haleakala	Pan-STARRS 1	·	840 m	MPC · JPL
654406	2015 BA_{156}	—	September 22, 2004	Kitt Peak	Spacewatch	·	1.4 km	MPC · JPL
654407	2015 BY_{156}	—	December 30, 2010	Piszkéstető	K. Sárneczky, Z. Kuli	V	600 m	MPC · JPL
654408	2015 BX_{161}	—	March 6, 2011	Kitt Peak	Spacewatch	·	1.8 km	MPC · JPL
654409	2015 BE_{165}	—	January 17, 2015	Haleakala	Pan-STARRS 1	KOR	970 m	MPC · JPL
654410	2015 BY_{167}	—	October 8, 2008	Kitt Peak	Spacewatch	KOR	950 m	MPC · JPL
654411	2015 BB_{171}	—	August 7, 2008	Kitt Peak	Spacewatch	·	1.2 km	MPC · JPL
654412	2015 BR_{173}	—	January 17, 2015	Haleakala	Pan-STARRS 1	·	1.1 km	MPC · JPL
654413	2015 BL_{177}	—	January 17, 2015	Haleakala	Pan-STARRS 1	·	2.1 km	MPC · JPL
654414	2015 BF_{180}	—	November 9, 2013	Mount Lemmon	Mount Lemmon Survey	·	1.2 km	MPC · JPL
654415	2015 BJ_{185}	—	January 17, 2015	Haleakala	Pan-STARRS 1	·	1.5 km	MPC · JPL
654416	2015 BF_{186}	—	November 23, 2014	Mount Lemmon	Mount Lemmon Survey	·	1.7 km	MPC · JPL
654417	2015 BS_{187}	—	October 23, 2013	Mount Lemmon	Mount Lemmon Survey	·	1.5 km	MPC · JPL
654418	2015 BM_{188}	—	September 3, 2008	Kitt Peak	Spacewatch	·	1.6 km	MPC · JPL
654419	2015 BC_{190}	—	March 13, 2011	Kitt Peak	Spacewatch	·	1.4 km	MPC · JPL
654420	2015 BO_{192}	—	January 14, 2011	Mount Lemmon	Mount Lemmon Survey	NYS	890 m	MPC · JPL
654421	2015 BO_{193}	—	January 26, 2006	Kitt Peak	Spacewatch	·	1.6 km	MPC · JPL
654422	2015 BL_{198}	—	January 17, 2015	Haleakala	Pan-STARRS 1	EUN	950 m	MPC · JPL
654423	2015 BV_{200}	—	December 5, 2005	Mount Lemmon	Mount Lemmon Survey	·	2.2 km	MPC · JPL
654424	2015 BO_{206}	—	February 28, 2008	Mount Lemmon	Mount Lemmon Survey	3:2	3.8 km	MPC · JPL
654425	2015 BT_{206}	—	December 15, 2014	Mount Lemmon	Mount Lemmon Survey	·	1.2 km	MPC · JPL
654426	2015 BX_{211}	—	December 18, 2014	Haleakala	Pan-STARRS 1	·	1.3 km	MPC · JPL
654427	2015 BJ_{212}	—	October 18, 2009	Mount Lemmon	Mount Lemmon Survey	·	1.3 km	MPC · JPL
654428	2015 BT_{213}	—	December 5, 2005	Kitt Peak	Spacewatch	·	1.0 km	MPC · JPL
654429	2015 BO_{217}	—	January 18, 2015	Haleakala	Pan-STARRS 1	·	1.8 km	MPC · JPL
654430	2015 BD_{218}	—	January 18, 2015	Haleakala	Pan-STARRS 1	V	580 m	MPC · JPL
654431	2015 BW_{219}	—	November 30, 2005	Kitt Peak	Spacewatch	WIT	950 m	MPC · JPL
654432	2015 BX_{220}	—	August 14, 2013	Haleakala	Pan-STARRS 1	AGN	950 m	MPC · JPL
654433	2015 BB_{225}	—	January 18, 2015	Mount Lemmon	Mount Lemmon Survey	·	1.3 km	MPC · JPL
654434	2015 BT_{225}	—	March 5, 2011	Mount Lemmon	Mount Lemmon Survey	NEM	1.6 km	MPC · JPL
654435	2015 BU_{225}	—	February 10, 2008	Kitt Peak	Spacewatch	3:2	4.0 km	MPC · JPL
654436	2015 BG_{228}	—	March 5, 2011	Mount Lemmon	Mount Lemmon Survey	·	1.3 km	MPC · JPL
654437	2015 BS_{228}	—	December 21, 2014	Haleakala	Pan-STARRS 1	·	1.2 km	MPC · JPL
654438	2015 BH_{232}	—	September 16, 2003	Kitt Peak	Spacewatch	·	680 m	MPC · JPL
654439	2015 BW_{232}	—	January 18, 2015	Haleakala	Pan-STARRS 1	·	1.8 km	MPC · JPL
654440	2015 BT_{233}	—	December 27, 2008	Bergisch Gladbach	W. Bickel	·	3.5 km	MPC · JPL
654441	2015 BE_{234}	—	December 26, 2014	Haleakala	Pan-STARRS 1	·	1.2 km	MPC · JPL
654442	2015 BV_{237}	—	November 9, 2009	Mount Lemmon	Mount Lemmon Survey	AGN	1 km	MPC · JPL
654443	2015 BQ_{240}	—	January 18, 2015	Haleakala	Pan-STARRS 1	WIT	880 m	MPC · JPL
654444	2015 BW_{241}	—	January 18, 2015	Haleakala	Pan-STARRS 1	·	1.8 km	MPC · JPL
654445	2015 BY_{242}	—	September 5, 2008	Kitt Peak	Spacewatch	·	1.5 km	MPC · JPL
654446	2015 BW_{243}	—	November 23, 2009	Mount Lemmon SkyCe	Block, A.	·	1.3 km	MPC · JPL
654447	2015 BE_{248}	—	January 4, 2006	Kitt Peak	Spacewatch	·	1.3 km	MPC · JPL
654448	2015 BM_{249}	—	September 27, 2006	Kitt Peak	Spacewatch	·	940 m	MPC · JPL
654449	2015 BE_{254}	—	December 21, 2014	Mount Lemmon	Mount Lemmon Survey	·	1.5 km	MPC · JPL
654450	2015 BG_{254}	—	January 18, 2015	Haleakala	Pan-STARRS 1	·	1.5 km	MPC · JPL
654451	2015 BV_{254}	—	May 23, 2001	Cerro Tololo	Deep Ecliptic Survey	·	2.5 km	MPC · JPL
654452	2015 BZ_{255}	—	January 18, 2015	Haleakala	Pan-STARRS 1	·	2.2 km	MPC · JPL
654453	2015 BS_{258}	—	February 13, 2008	Mount Lemmon	Mount Lemmon Survey	MAS	650 m	MPC · JPL
654454	2015 BF_{266}	—	December 2, 2005	Kitt Peak	Spacewatch	·	1.6 km	MPC · JPL
654455	2015 BZ_{266}	—	November 28, 2014	Catalina	CSS	·	1.6 km	MPC · JPL
654456	2015 BK_{270}	—	January 19, 2015	Kitt Peak	Spacewatch	·	1.5 km	MPC · JPL
654457	2015 BD_{273}	—	November 17, 2014	Haleakala	Pan-STARRS 1	HNS	880 m	MPC · JPL
654458	2015 BN_{273}	—	December 8, 2010	Mount Lemmon	Mount Lemmon Survey	·	1.3 km	MPC · JPL
654459	2015 BU_{273}	—	December 19, 2004	Mount Lemmon	Mount Lemmon Survey	·	3.9 km	MPC · JPL
654460	2015 BD_{275}	—	December 15, 2010	Mount Lemmon	Mount Lemmon Survey	MAR	1.1 km	MPC · JPL
654461	2015 BP_{275}	—	January 19, 2015	Mount Lemmon	Mount Lemmon Survey	·	1.3 km	MPC · JPL
654462	2015 BN_{276}	—	July 27, 2011	Haleakala	Pan-STARRS 1	·	2.4 km	MPC · JPL
654463	2015 BO_{285}	—	January 19, 2015	Haleakala	Pan-STARRS 1	EUN	990 m	MPC · JPL
654464	2015 BC_{287}	—	January 19, 2015	Haleakala	Pan-STARRS 1	·	1.7 km	MPC · JPL
654465	2015 BM_{289}	—	June 19, 2012	Kitt Peak	Spacewatch	·	2.4 km	MPC · JPL
654466	2015 BY_{295}	—	October 8, 2008	Kitt Peak	Spacewatch	·	1.7 km	MPC · JPL
654467	2015 BS_{302}	—	April 20, 2006	Kitt Peak	Spacewatch	·	1.9 km	MPC · JPL
654468	2015 BU_{302}	—	December 2, 2004	Kitt Peak	Spacewatch	·	2.2 km	MPC · JPL
654469	2015 BF_{305}	—	December 1, 2008	Kitt Peak	Spacewatch	·	2.2 km	MPC · JPL
654470	2015 BX_{305}	—	October 2, 2000	Apache Point	SDSS	·	1.8 km	MPC · JPL
654471	2015 BJ_{308}	—	April 14, 2011	Mount Lemmon	Mount Lemmon Survey	·	1.5 km	MPC · JPL
654472	2015 BS_{308}	—	November 30, 2003	Kitt Peak	Spacewatch	·	760 m	MPC · JPL
654473	2015 BL_{309}	—	January 20, 2015	Mount Lemmon	Mount Lemmon Survey	·	1.9 km	MPC · JPL
654474	2015 BG_{313}	—	March 2, 2011	Mount Lemmon	Mount Lemmon Survey	MIS	1.9 km	MPC · JPL
654475	2015 BG_{315}	—	January 16, 2015	Haleakala	Pan-STARRS 1	·	1.5 km	MPC · JPL
654476	2015 BM_{315}	—	November 8, 2009	Mount Lemmon	Mount Lemmon Survey	WIT	710 m	MPC · JPL
654477	2015 BZ_{316}	—	January 7, 2006	Mount Lemmon	Mount Lemmon Survey	·	1.5 km	MPC · JPL
654478	2015 BQ_{319}	—	January 17, 2015	Haleakala	Pan-STARRS 1	·	1.9 km	MPC · JPL
654479	2015 BS_{320}	—	September 23, 2008	Mount Lemmon	Mount Lemmon Survey	·	1.5 km	MPC · JPL
654480	2015 BF_{321}	—	September 15, 2013	Haleakala	Pan-STARRS 1	·	1.4 km	MPC · JPL
654481	2015 BP_{321}	—	January 17, 2015	Haleakala	Pan-STARRS 1	WIT	740 m	MPC · JPL
654482	2015 BM_{323}	—	January 17, 2015	Haleakala	Pan-STARRS 1	·	1.4 km	MPC · JPL
654483	2015 BU_{323}	—	September 10, 2007	Mount Lemmon	Mount Lemmon Survey	·	600 m	MPC · JPL
654484	2015 BK_{325}	—	October 1, 2008	Mount Lemmon	Mount Lemmon Survey	EUN	1.0 km	MPC · JPL
654485	2015 BU_{325}	—	March 13, 2011	Kitt Peak	Spacewatch	AGN	1.1 km	MPC · JPL
654486	2015 BG_{327}	—	September 22, 2009	Mount Lemmon	Mount Lemmon Survey	·	1.2 km	MPC · JPL
654487	2015 BW_{327}	—	January 23, 2006	Kitt Peak	Spacewatch	PAD	1.3 km	MPC · JPL
654488	2015 BG_{329}	—	January 17, 2015	Haleakala	Pan-STARRS 1	·	1.7 km	MPC · JPL
654489	2015 BB_{333}	—	January 17, 2015	Haleakala	Pan-STARRS 1	·	1.4 km	MPC · JPL
654490	2015 BW_{334}	—	February 25, 2011	Kitt Peak	Spacewatch	·	1.8 km	MPC · JPL
654491	2015 BB_{340}	—	January 17, 2015	Haleakala	Pan-STARRS 1	·	1.7 km	MPC · JPL
654492	2015 BL_{340}	—	October 30, 2008	Mount Lemmon	Mount Lemmon Survey	·	1.4 km	MPC · JPL
654493	2015 BW_{345}	—	January 18, 2015	Mount Lemmon	Mount Lemmon Survey	·	1.7 km	MPC · JPL
654494	2015 BJ_{346}	—	December 25, 2005	Kitt Peak	Spacewatch	·	1.4 km	MPC · JPL
654495	2015 BF_{347}	—	November 9, 2009	Kitt Peak	Spacewatch	AGN	1.2 km	MPC · JPL
654496	2015 BW_{349}	—	January 31, 2006	Kitt Peak	Spacewatch	AGN	860 m	MPC · JPL
654497	2015 BQ_{354}	—	December 30, 2007	Mount Lemmon	Mount Lemmon Survey	·	620 m	MPC · JPL
654498	2015 BA_{359}	—	November 3, 2005	Mount Lemmon	Mount Lemmon Survey	·	1.1 km	MPC · JPL
654499	2015 BH_{361}	—	August 9, 2013	Kitt Peak	Spacewatch	·	1.2 km	MPC · JPL
654500	2015 BP_{373}	—	January 20, 2015	Haleakala	Pan-STARRS 1	·	1.1 km	MPC · JPL

== 654501–654600 ==
back to top

Designation			Discovery			Properties		Ref
Permanent	Provisional	Named after	Date	Site	Discoverer(s)	Category	Diam.	Ref
654501	2015 BH_{375}	—	January 18, 2015	Mount Lemmon	Mount Lemmon Survey	·	1.3 km	MPC · JPL
654502	2015 BT_{377}	—	December 26, 2014	Haleakala	Pan-STARRS 1	·	1.4 km	MPC · JPL
654503	2015 BQ_{379}	—	October 3, 2013	Haleakala	Pan-STARRS 1	PAD	1.7 km	MPC · JPL
654504	2015 BD_{381}	—	March 21, 2002	Kitt Peak	Spacewatch	·	1.8 km	MPC · JPL
654505	2015 BC_{388}	—	October 2, 2013	Mount Lemmon	Mount Lemmon Survey	AGN	980 m	MPC · JPL
654506	2015 BR_{390}	—	October 3, 2013	Haleakala	Pan-STARRS 1	·	1.7 km	MPC · JPL
654507	2015 BT_{391}	—	November 10, 2013	Mount Lemmon	Mount Lemmon Survey	·	1.5 km	MPC · JPL
654508	2015 BB_{396}	—	October 10, 2004	Kitt Peak	Spacewatch	·	1.8 km	MPC · JPL
654509	2015 BK_{399}	—	October 4, 2002	Palomar	NEAT	MAS	600 m	MPC · JPL
654510	2015 BS_{400}	—	November 3, 2008	Mount Lemmon	Mount Lemmon Survey	EOS	1.4 km	MPC · JPL
654511	2015 BY_{400}	—	October 3, 2013	Haleakala	Pan-STARRS 1	AGN	930 m	MPC · JPL
654512	2015 BK_{402}	—	January 20, 2015	Haleakala	Pan-STARRS 1	·	1.1 km	MPC · JPL
654513	2015 BO_{403}	—	September 20, 2008	Mount Lemmon	Mount Lemmon Survey	·	1.3 km	MPC · JPL
654514	2015 BK_{404}	—	January 5, 2006	Mount Lemmon	Mount Lemmon Survey	·	1.3 km	MPC · JPL
654515	2015 BW_{404}	—	January 20, 2015	Haleakala	Pan-STARRS 1	·	1.5 km	MPC · JPL
654516	2015 BQ_{405}	—	May 16, 2012	Haleakala	Pan-STARRS 1	MAR	1.1 km	MPC · JPL
654517	2015 BS_{408}	—	September 24, 2008	Mount Lemmon	Mount Lemmon Survey	·	1.5 km	MPC · JPL
654518	2015 BW_{409}	—	January 20, 2015	Haleakala	Pan-STARRS 1	·	1.3 km	MPC · JPL
654519	2015 BH_{410}	—	January 20, 2015	Haleakala	Pan-STARRS 1	HOF	1.9 km	MPC · JPL
654520	2015 BK_{411}	—	October 23, 2008	Kitt Peak	Spacewatch	·	1.4 km	MPC · JPL
654521	2015 BF_{416}	—	March 12, 2011	Mount Lemmon	Mount Lemmon Survey	·	1.6 km	MPC · JPL
654522	2015 BS_{420}	—	October 2, 2008	Mount Lemmon	Mount Lemmon Survey	KOR	1.1 km	MPC · JPL
654523	2015 BZ_{421}	—	October 12, 2007	Mount Lemmon	Mount Lemmon Survey	·	670 m	MPC · JPL
654524	2015 BB_{424}	—	November 2, 2007	Mount Lemmon	Mount Lemmon Survey	·	630 m	MPC · JPL
654525	2015 BA_{427}	—	February 4, 2006	Kitt Peak	Spacewatch	·	1.6 km	MPC · JPL
654526	2015 BL_{432}	—	September 6, 2013	Mount Lemmon	Mount Lemmon Survey	·	1.5 km	MPC · JPL
654527	2015 BB_{436}	—	October 5, 2013	Mount Lemmon	Mount Lemmon Survey	(13314)	1.5 km	MPC · JPL
654528	2015 BY_{439}	—	December 3, 2005	Mauna Kea	A. Boattini	AST	1.5 km	MPC · JPL
654529	2015 BS_{443}	—	January 20, 2015	Haleakala	Pan-STARRS 1	·	470 m	MPC · JPL
654530	2015 BD_{446}	—	January 20, 2015	Haleakala	Pan-STARRS 1	·	2.1 km	MPC · JPL
654531	2015 BJ_{448}	—	January 20, 2015	Haleakala	Pan-STARRS 1	·	2.0 km	MPC · JPL
654532	2015 BA_{451}	—	October 25, 2013	Mount Lemmon	Mount Lemmon Survey	AGN	970 m	MPC · JPL
654533	2015 BE_{451}	—	November 3, 1999	Kitt Peak	Spacewatch	AGN	950 m	MPC · JPL
654534	2015 BL_{451}	—	November 24, 2008	Mount Lemmon	Mount Lemmon Survey	KOR	1.2 km	MPC · JPL
654535	2015 BS_{451}	—	September 26, 2003	Apache Point	SDSS Collaboration	·	1.4 km	MPC · JPL
654536	2015 BK_{452}	—	January 20, 2015	Haleakala	Pan-STARRS 1	·	1.5 km	MPC · JPL
654537	2015 BU_{453}	—	April 29, 2008	Mount Lemmon	Mount Lemmon Survey	·	910 m	MPC · JPL
654538	2015 BO_{463}	—	August 13, 2004	Cerro Tololo	Deep Ecliptic Survey	EUN	1.2 km	MPC · JPL
654539	2015 BU_{469}	—	July 15, 2013	Haleakala	Pan-STARRS 1	V	440 m	MPC · JPL
654540	2015 BT_{474}	—	November 7, 2005	Mauna Kea	A. Boattini	·	1.5 km	MPC · JPL
654541	2015 BD_{475}	—	January 20, 2015	Haleakala	Pan-STARRS 1	·	1.6 km	MPC · JPL
654542	2015 BW_{477}	—	January 20, 2015	Haleakala	Pan-STARRS 1	AGN	860 m	MPC · JPL
654543	2015 BH_{478}	—	August 29, 2006	Kitt Peak	Spacewatch	·	720 m	MPC · JPL
654544	2015 BN_{478}	—	January 10, 2006	Mount Lemmon	Mount Lemmon Survey	JUN	1.1 km	MPC · JPL
654545	2015 BE_{480}	—	February 26, 2011	Mount Lemmon	Mount Lemmon Survey	·	1.4 km	MPC · JPL
654546	2015 BP_{480}	—	August 7, 2008	Kitt Peak	Spacewatch	·	1.5 km	MPC · JPL
654547	2015 BQ_{480}	—	January 20, 2015	Haleakala	Pan-STARRS 1	·	1.8 km	MPC · JPL
654548	2015 BR_{482}	—	September 5, 2008	Kitt Peak	Spacewatch	·	1.6 km	MPC · JPL
654549	2015 BE_{485}	—	October 13, 2013	Nogales	M. Schwartz, P. R. Holvorcem	·	2.4 km	MPC · JPL
654550	2015 BX_{485}	—	January 20, 2015	Haleakala	Pan-STARRS 1	·	1.5 km	MPC · JPL
654551	2015 BK_{486}	—	December 29, 2005	Kitt Peak	Spacewatch	·	1.1 km	MPC · JPL
654552	2015 BK_{487}	—	October 7, 2004	Kitt Peak	Spacewatch	·	1.4 km	MPC · JPL
654553	2015 BN_{487}	—	January 20, 2015	Haleakala	Pan-STARRS 1	·	2.0 km	MPC · JPL
654554	2015 BP_{487}	—	January 20, 2015	Haleakala	Pan-STARRS 1	·	630 m	MPC · JPL
654555	2015 BO_{488}	—	November 7, 2005	Mauna Kea	A. Boattini	·	1.3 km	MPC · JPL
654556	2015 BG_{490}	—	March 5, 2006	Kitt Peak	Spacewatch	AGN	1.1 km	MPC · JPL
654557	2015 BW_{492}	—	October 14, 2013	Kitt Peak	Spacewatch	·	1.4 km	MPC · JPL
654558	2015 BJ_{496}	—	August 7, 2008	Kitt Peak	Spacewatch	HOF	2.4 km	MPC · JPL
654559	2015 BE_{497}	—	January 20, 2015	Haleakala	Pan-STARRS 1	·	1.5 km	MPC · JPL
654560	2015 BA_{500}	—	February 27, 2012	Haleakala	Pan-STARRS 1	·	460 m	MPC · JPL
654561	2015 BC_{504}	—	April 12, 2011	Mount Lemmon	Mount Lemmon Survey	AGN	1.0 km	MPC · JPL
654562	2015 BN_{507}	—	March 3, 2006	Kitt Peak	Spacewatch	·	1.4 km	MPC · JPL
654563	2015 BY_{508}	—	October 24, 2005	Mauna Kea	A. Boattini	·	2.0 km	MPC · JPL
654564	2015 BV_{511}	—	July 14, 2013	Haleakala	Pan-STARRS 1	·	1.6 km	MPC · JPL
654565	2015 BY_{511}	—	November 24, 2014	Mount Lemmon	Mount Lemmon Survey	·	1.5 km	MPC · JPL
654566	2015 BA_{512}	—	December 5, 2005	Kitt Peak	Spacewatch	·	1.1 km	MPC · JPL
654567	2015 BA_{516}	—	January 16, 2015	Haleakala	Pan-STARRS 1	HOF	1.9 km	MPC · JPL
654568	2015 BC_{516}	—	January 13, 2015	Haleakala	Pan-STARRS 1	·	520 m	MPC · JPL
654569	2015 BA_{519}	—	January 26, 2015	Haleakala	Pan-STARRS 1	plutino	138 km	MPC · JPL
654570	2015 BM_{521}	—	September 10, 2007	Mount Lemmon	Mount Lemmon Survey	L4	6.8 km	MPC · JPL
654571	2015 BH_{529}	—	January 17, 2015	Haleakala	Pan-STARRS 1	EUN	1.0 km	MPC · JPL
654572	2015 BC_{531}	—	January 21, 2015	Haleakala	Pan-STARRS 1	·	2.2 km	MPC · JPL
654573	2015 BN_{531}	—	January 22, 2015	Haleakala	Pan-STARRS 1	·	1.7 km	MPC · JPL
654574	2015 BU_{533}	—	January 30, 2015	Haleakala	Pan-STARRS 1	·	2.3 km	MPC · JPL
654575	2015 BA_{534}	—	September 22, 2008	Kitt Peak	Spacewatch	AGN	1.1 km	MPC · JPL
654576	2015 BB_{534}	—	January 23, 2015	Haleakala	Pan-STARRS 1	·	1.7 km	MPC · JPL
654577	2015 BY_{535}	—	November 17, 2009	Mount Lemmon	Mount Lemmon Survey	·	1.2 km	MPC · JPL
654578	2015 BU_{536}	—	November 9, 2013	Kitt Peak	Spacewatch	·	1.5 km	MPC · JPL
654579	2015 BJ_{537}	—	January 23, 2015	Haleakala	Pan-STARRS 1	·	2.5 km	MPC · JPL
654580	2015 BZ_{537}	—	January 22, 2015	Haleakala	Pan-STARRS 1	·	2.0 km	MPC · JPL
654581	2015 BU_{538}	—	March 4, 2011	Mount Lemmon	Mount Lemmon Survey	·	1.3 km	MPC · JPL
654582	2015 BL_{541}	—	November 8, 2007	Mount Lemmon	Mount Lemmon Survey	·	2.1 km	MPC · JPL
654583	2015 BA_{542}	—	February 1, 2009	Kitt Peak	Spacewatch	·	2.5 km	MPC · JPL
654584	2015 BF_{543}	—	October 28, 2013	Mount Lemmon	Mount Lemmon Survey	·	1.7 km	MPC · JPL
654585	2015 BO_{543}	—	January 19, 2015	Haleakala	Pan-STARRS 1	·	2.0 km	MPC · JPL
654586	2015 BZ_{543}	—	January 22, 2015	Haleakala	Pan-STARRS 1	·	2.0 km	MPC · JPL
654587	2015 BK_{546}	—	October 9, 2013	Mount Lemmon	Mount Lemmon Survey	·	1.8 km	MPC · JPL
654588	2015 BZ_{546}	—	November 29, 2013	Haleakala	Pan-STARRS 1	·	2.2 km	MPC · JPL
654589	2015 BP_{547}	—	January 8, 2010	Kitt Peak	Spacewatch	·	1.8 km	MPC · JPL
654590	2015 BV_{549}	—	October 3, 2013	Haleakala	Pan-STARRS 1	·	1.6 km	MPC · JPL
654591	2015 BS_{551}	—	April 3, 2011	Haleakala	Pan-STARRS 1	GEF	1.0 km	MPC · JPL
654592	2015 BC_{556}	—	October 30, 2008	Kitt Peak	Spacewatch	EOS	1.9 km	MPC · JPL
654593	2015 BY_{561}	—	January 20, 2015	Haleakala	Pan-STARRS 1	·	1.5 km	MPC · JPL
654594	2015 BW_{562}	—	November 3, 2007	Mount Lemmon	Mount Lemmon Survey	·	610 m	MPC · JPL
654595	2015 BM_{567}	—	September 6, 2008	Mount Lemmon	Mount Lemmon Survey	·	1.7 km	MPC · JPL
654596	2015 BY_{567}	—	February 16, 2002	Cerro Tololo	Deep Lens Survey	AGN	970 m	MPC · JPL
654597	2015 BZ_{567}	—	October 4, 2004	Kitt Peak	Spacewatch	NEM	1.9 km	MPC · JPL
654598	2015 BU_{568}	—	October 15, 2007	Mount Lemmon	Mount Lemmon Survey	·	2.5 km	MPC · JPL
654599	2015 BT_{571}	—	January 23, 2015	Haleakala	Pan-STARRS 1	·	510 m	MPC · JPL
654600	2015 BF_{576}	—	November 23, 2009	Kitt Peak	Spacewatch	(12739)	1.3 km	MPC · JPL

== 654601–654700 ==
back to top

Designation			Discovery			Properties		Ref
Permanent	Provisional	Named after	Date	Site	Discoverer(s)	Category	Diam.	Ref
654601	2015 BE_{590}	—	January 22, 2015	Haleakala	Pan-STARRS 1	·	540 m	MPC · JPL
654602	2015 BR_{590}	—	January 22, 2015	Haleakala	Pan-STARRS 1	·	1.4 km	MPC · JPL
654603	2015 BV_{590}	—	January 20, 2015	Haleakala	Pan-STARRS 1	·	1.6 km	MPC · JPL
654604	2015 BS_{593}	—	January 23, 2015	Haleakala	Pan-STARRS 1	·	1.9 km	MPC · JPL
654605	2015 BD_{594}	—	January 22, 2015	Haleakala	Pan-STARRS 1	·	1.5 km	MPC · JPL
654606	2015 BK_{594}	—	January 25, 2015	Haleakala	Pan-STARRS 1	·	1.4 km	MPC · JPL
654607	2015 BL_{594}	—	January 23, 2015	Haleakala	Pan-STARRS 1	·	1.8 km	MPC · JPL
654608	2015 BQ_{594}	—	January 17, 2015	Haleakala	Pan-STARRS 1	·	1.4 km	MPC · JPL
654609	2015 BD_{595}	—	January 17, 2015	Haleakala	Pan-STARRS 1	GEF	1.1 km	MPC · JPL
654610	2015 BP_{595}	—	January 24, 2015	Haleakala	Pan-STARRS 1	·	1.9 km	MPC · JPL
654611	2015 BR_{596}	—	January 23, 2015	Haleakala	Pan-STARRS 1	·	1.6 km	MPC · JPL
654612	2015 BT_{600}	—	January 27, 2015	Haleakala	Pan-STARRS 1	·	1.7 km	MPC · JPL
654613	2015 BE_{603}	—	January 23, 2015	Haleakala	Pan-STARRS 1	·	1.5 km	MPC · JPL
654614	2015 BV_{604}	—	January 24, 2015	Haleakala	Pan-STARRS 1	GEF	1.0 km	MPC · JPL
654615	2015 BA_{607}	—	January 20, 2015	Haleakala	Pan-STARRS 1	KOR	1.1 km	MPC · JPL
654616	2015 BA_{608}	—	October 30, 2008	Mount Lemmon	Mount Lemmon Survey	·	1.5 km	MPC · JPL
654617	2015 BD_{608}	—	January 20, 2015	Haleakala	Pan-STARRS 1	·	1.6 km	MPC · JPL
654618	2015 BL_{613}	—	January 16, 2015	Haleakala	Pan-STARRS 1	·	1.6 km	MPC · JPL
654619	2015 BN_{617}	—	January 28, 2015	Haleakala	Pan-STARRS 1	·	1.4 km	MPC · JPL
654620	2015 CA_{6}	—	February 3, 2008	Kitt Peak	Spacewatch	·	1 km	MPC · JPL
654621	2015 CZ_{7}	—	October 13, 2013	Mount Lemmon	Mount Lemmon Survey	·	1.3 km	MPC · JPL
654622	2015 CK_{9}	—	January 20, 2015	Haleakala	Pan-STARRS 1	·	1.4 km	MPC · JPL
654623	2015 CO_{12}	—	November 2, 2013	Mount Lemmon	Mount Lemmon Survey	·	3.1 km	MPC · JPL
654624	2015 CB_{18}	—	October 3, 2013	Mount Lemmon	Mount Lemmon Survey	·	1.4 km	MPC · JPL
654625	2015 CM_{20}	—	April 29, 2003	Kitt Peak	Spacewatch	·	1.3 km	MPC · JPL
654626	2015 CE_{21}	—	November 12, 2013	Mount Lemmon	Mount Lemmon Survey	·	1.4 km	MPC · JPL
654627	2015 CL_{21}	—	October 3, 2013	Haleakala	Pan-STARRS 1	AST	1.6 km	MPC · JPL
654628	2015 CR_{21}	—	September 21, 2008	Mount Lemmon	Mount Lemmon Survey	·	2.0 km	MPC · JPL
654629	2015 CY_{23}	—	October 30, 2013	Haleakala	Pan-STARRS 1	·	1.6 km	MPC · JPL
654630	2015 CQ_{26}	—	March 10, 2005	Mount Lemmon	Mount Lemmon Survey	·	540 m	MPC · JPL
654631	2015 CK_{27}	—	September 14, 2013	Haleakala	Pan-STARRS 1	·	1.5 km	MPC · JPL
654632	2015 CA_{29}	—	July 13, 2013	Haleakala	Pan-STARRS 1	·	710 m	MPC · JPL
654633	2015 CY_{31}	—	November 11, 2013	Mount Lemmon	Mount Lemmon Survey	·	1.7 km	MPC · JPL
654634	2015 CN_{32}	—	September 11, 2005	Kitt Peak	Spacewatch	·	1.2 km	MPC · JPL
654635	2015 CQ_{32}	—	March 26, 2001	Kitt Peak	Deep Ecliptic Survey	·	1.9 km	MPC · JPL
654636	2015 CQ_{33}	—	January 25, 2015	Haleakala	Pan-STARRS 1	·	2.1 km	MPC · JPL
654637	2015 CU_{33}	—	January 26, 2006	Catalina	CSS	·	1.5 km	MPC · JPL
654638	2015 CX_{35}	—	November 18, 2009	Kitt Peak	Spacewatch	·	1.7 km	MPC · JPL
654639	2015 CY_{43}	—	January 23, 2006	Mount Lemmon	Mount Lemmon Survey	·	1.6 km	MPC · JPL
654640	2015 CJ_{44}	—	December 20, 2009	Mount Lemmon	Mount Lemmon Survey	·	1.7 km	MPC · JPL
654641	2015 CV_{44}	—	November 30, 2003	Kitt Peak	Spacewatch	·	750 m	MPC · JPL
654642	2015 CZ_{50}	—	November 3, 2010	Kitt Peak	Spacewatch	·	720 m	MPC · JPL
654643	2015 CK_{55}	—	February 11, 2015	Mount Lemmon	Mount Lemmon Survey	·	2.4 km	MPC · JPL
654644	2015 CR_{59}	—	April 19, 2004	Kitt Peak	Spacewatch	L4	7.8 km	MPC · JPL
654645	2015 CB_{60}	—	December 25, 2005	Mount Lemmon	Mount Lemmon Survey	·	1.9 km	MPC · JPL
654646	2015 CF_{60}	—	February 14, 2004	Palomar	NEAT	H	680 m	MPC · JPL
654647	2015 CN_{62}	—	January 18, 2015	Mount Lemmon	Mount Lemmon Survey	AMO	330 m	MPC · JPL
654648	2015 CX_{63}	—	August 26, 2003	Cerro Tololo	Deep Ecliptic Survey	·	1.7 km	MPC · JPL
654649	2015 CZ_{64}	—	December 3, 2005	Mauna Kea	A. Boattini	·	1.7 km	MPC · JPL
654650	2015 CY_{65}	—	February 4, 2006	Kitt Peak	Spacewatch	·	1.5 km	MPC · JPL
654651	2015 CW_{70}	—	February 10, 2015	Kitt Peak	Spacewatch	·	530 m	MPC · JPL
654652	2015 CF_{77}	—	February 13, 2015	Mount Lemmon	Mount Lemmon Survey	·	1.6 km	MPC · JPL
654653	2015 DW_{1}	—	December 16, 2014	Haleakala	Pan-STARRS 1	·	1.2 km	MPC · JPL
654654	2015 DM_{2}	—	January 16, 2015	Haleakala	Pan-STARRS 1	·	1.3 km	MPC · JPL
654655	2015 DY_{3}	—	March 27, 2011	Mount Lemmon	Mount Lemmon Survey	AGN	1.1 km	MPC · JPL
654656	2015 DK_{5}	—	January 16, 2015	Haleakala	Pan-STARRS 1	·	1.2 km	MPC · JPL
654657	2015 DW_{5}	—	October 3, 2013	Haleakala	Pan-STARRS 1	HOF	2.1 km	MPC · JPL
654658	2015 DE_{9}	—	January 18, 2015	Haleakala	Pan-STARRS 1	·	1.6 km	MPC · JPL
654659	2015 DK_{10}	—	October 10, 2008	Mount Lemmon	Mount Lemmon Survey	·	1.6 km	MPC · JPL
654660	2015 DN_{10}	—	March 10, 2011	Kitt Peak	Spacewatch	·	1.4 km	MPC · JPL
654661	2015 DS_{10}	—	January 17, 2015	Haleakala	Pan-STARRS 1	·	1.8 km	MPC · JPL
654662	2015 DH_{13}	—	January 23, 2006	Mount Lemmon	Mount Lemmon Survey	·	1.7 km	MPC · JPL
654663	2015 DZ_{15}	—	October 22, 2009	Catalina	CSS	·	1.4 km	MPC · JPL
654664	2015 DU_{16}	—	January 18, 2015	Haleakala	Pan-STARRS 1	·	1.1 km	MPC · JPL
654665	2015 DM_{18}	—	January 27, 2015	Haleakala	Pan-STARRS 1	HOF	2.0 km	MPC · JPL
654666	2015 DE_{19}	—	January 27, 2015	Haleakala	Pan-STARRS 1	·	1.5 km	MPC · JPL
654667	2015 DK_{19}	—	April 5, 2011	Kitt Peak	Spacewatch	HOF	2.5 km	MPC · JPL
654668	2015 DB_{22}	—	October 8, 2008	Kitt Peak	Spacewatch	·	2.0 km	MPC · JPL
654669	2015 DD_{22}	—	November 9, 2013	Mount Lemmon	Mount Lemmon Survey	·	1.4 km	MPC · JPL
654670	2015 DH_{25}	—	January 21, 2015	Haleakala	Pan-STARRS 1	·	1.4 km	MPC · JPL
654671	2015 DK_{34}	—	August 9, 2013	Haleakala	Pan-STARRS 1	·	620 m	MPC · JPL
654672	2015 DA_{36}	—	October 24, 2013	Mount Lemmon	Mount Lemmon Survey	·	1.6 km	MPC · JPL
654673	2015 DL_{36}	—	February 16, 2015	Haleakala	Pan-STARRS 1	KOR	1.1 km	MPC · JPL
654674	2015 DP_{39}	—	February 16, 2015	Haleakala	Pan-STARRS 1	·	1.9 km	MPC · JPL
654675	2015 DN_{45}	—	January 27, 2015	Haleakala	Pan-STARRS 1	·	680 m	MPC · JPL
654676	2015 DH_{48}	—	March 28, 2012	Mount Lemmon	Mount Lemmon Survey	·	590 m	MPC · JPL
654677	2015 DV_{49}	—	October 25, 2013	Palomar	Palomar Transient Factory	·	590 m	MPC · JPL
654678	2015 DJ_{52}	—	August 29, 2009	Catalina	CSS	MAS	760 m	MPC · JPL
654679	2015 DH_{53}	—	October 3, 2008	Mount Lemmon	Mount Lemmon Survey	·	1.7 km	MPC · JPL
654680	2015 DW_{56}	—	October 23, 2004	Kitt Peak	Spacewatch	·	1.6 km	MPC · JPL
654681	2015 DF_{57}	—	October 26, 2008	Mount Lemmon	Mount Lemmon Survey	·	1.3 km	MPC · JPL
654682	2015 DB_{59}	—	December 17, 2009	Kitt Peak	Spacewatch	AST	1.5 km	MPC · JPL
654683	2015 DT_{61}	—	January 20, 2015	Haleakala	Pan-STARRS 1	·	1.2 km	MPC · JPL
654684	2015 DG_{62}	—	August 6, 2012	Haleakala	Pan-STARRS 1	·	1.8 km	MPC · JPL
654685	2015 DA_{63}	—	October 19, 2003	Apache Point	SDSS Collaboration	AGN	1.0 km	MPC · JPL
654686	2015 DD_{64}	—	October 5, 2013	Haleakala	Pan-STARRS 1	·	1.3 km	MPC · JPL
654687	2015 DK_{67}	—	January 20, 2015	Haleakala	Pan-STARRS 1	·	1.6 km	MPC · JPL
654688	2015 DD_{68}	—	February 16, 2015	Haleakala	Pan-STARRS 1	·	1.6 km	MPC · JPL
654689	2015 DE_{70}	—	January 16, 2015	Haleakala	Pan-STARRS 1	KOR	1.1 km	MPC · JPL
654690	2015 DJ_{72}	—	May 29, 2011	Mount Lemmon	Mount Lemmon Survey	·	1.7 km	MPC · JPL
654691	2015 DR_{74}	—	February 13, 2001	Kitt Peak	Spacewatch	·	1.5 km	MPC · JPL
654692	2015 DR_{78}	—	September 14, 2013	Haleakala	Pan-STARRS 1	·	1.6 km	MPC · JPL
654693	2015 DT_{82}	—	January 7, 2006	Mount Lemmon	Mount Lemmon Survey	·	1.2 km	MPC · JPL
654694	2015 DE_{89}	—	October 31, 2005	Mauna Kea	A. Boattini	AST	1.6 km	MPC · JPL
654695	2015 DJ_{93}	—	September 11, 2010	Kitt Peak	Spacewatch	·	640 m	MPC · JPL
654696	2015 DS_{94}	—	May 6, 2011	Kitt Peak	Spacewatch	·	1.7 km	MPC · JPL
654697	2015 DV_{94}	—	January 27, 2015	Haleakala	Pan-STARRS 1	·	2.1 km	MPC · JPL
654698	2015 DY_{101}	—	September 5, 2013	Catalina	CSS	·	1.2 km	MPC · JPL
654699	2015 DH_{103}	—	April 6, 2011	Mount Lemmon	Mount Lemmon Survey	·	1.8 km	MPC · JPL
654700	2015 DY_{106}	—	February 17, 2015	Haleakala	Pan-STARRS 1	·	1.4 km	MPC · JPL

== 654701–654800 ==
back to top

Designation			Discovery			Properties		Ref
Permanent	Provisional	Named after	Date	Site	Discoverer(s)	Category	Diam.	Ref
654701	2015 DO_{107}	—	January 15, 2015	Haleakala	Pan-STARRS 1	JUN	940 m	MPC · JPL
654702	2015 DT_{108}	—	November 26, 2009	Mount Lemmon	Mount Lemmon Survey	·	1.5 km	MPC · JPL
654703	2015 DT_{111}	—	March 12, 2004	Palomar	NEAT	·	1.4 km	MPC · JPL
654704	2015 DU_{113}	—	March 5, 2011	Kitt Peak	Spacewatch	·	1.3 km	MPC · JPL
654705	2015 DW_{115}	—	June 16, 2012	Haleakala	Pan-STARRS 1	GEF	1.2 km	MPC · JPL
654706	2015 DS_{116}	—	October 3, 2008	Mount Lemmon	Mount Lemmon Survey	·	2.1 km	MPC · JPL
654707	2015 DU_{117}	—	January 28, 2015	Haleakala	Pan-STARRS 1	·	2.0 km	MPC · JPL
654708	2015 DD_{119}	—	November 8, 2013	Mount Lemmon	Mount Lemmon Survey	·	1.2 km	MPC · JPL
654709	2015 DN_{119}	—	November 19, 2008	Kitt Peak	Spacewatch	·	1.8 km	MPC · JPL
654710	2015 DQ_{119}	—	October 3, 2013	Mount Lemmon	Mount Lemmon Survey	·	600 m	MPC · JPL
654711	2015 DL_{123}	—	April 24, 2007	Mount Lemmon	Mount Lemmon Survey	·	2.0 km	MPC · JPL
654712	2015 DY_{125}	—	November 28, 2013	Mount Lemmon	Mount Lemmon Survey	EOS	2.1 km	MPC · JPL
654713	2015 DS_{126}	—	November 30, 2008	Kitt Peak	Spacewatch	·	2.2 km	MPC · JPL
654714	2015 DC_{127}	—	February 17, 2015	Haleakala	Pan-STARRS 1	EOS	1.8 km	MPC · JPL
654715	2015 DK_{129}	—	February 17, 2015	Haleakala	Pan-STARRS 1	·	2.1 km	MPC · JPL
654716	2015 DZ_{134}	—	November 12, 2013	Mount Lemmon	Mount Lemmon Survey	·	2.3 km	MPC · JPL
654717	2015 DO_{136}	—	December 23, 2012	Haleakala	Pan-STARRS 1	L4	7.1 km	MPC · JPL
654718	2015 DX_{138}	—	January 23, 2006	Mount Lemmon	Mount Lemmon Survey	·	1.7 km	MPC · JPL
654719	2015 DB_{139}	—	April 13, 2011	Kitt Peak	Spacewatch	·	1.4 km	MPC · JPL
654720	2015 DD_{141}	—	January 17, 2015	Mount Lemmon	Mount Lemmon Survey	·	1.6 km	MPC · JPL
654721	2015 DX_{142}	—	March 9, 2011	Kitt Peak	Spacewatch	·	1.6 km	MPC · JPL
654722	2015 DW_{143}	—	September 29, 1973	Palomar	C. J. van Houten, I. van Houten-Groeneveld, T. Gehrels	·	1.1 km	MPC · JPL
654723	2015 DU_{144}	—	January 28, 2011	Kitt Peak	Spacewatch	·	1.4 km	MPC · JPL
654724	2015 DK_{146}	—	November 25, 2005	Mount Lemmon	Mount Lemmon Survey	·	1.6 km	MPC · JPL
654725	2015 DQ_{147}	—	October 7, 2005	Mauna Kea	A. Boattini	·	1.7 km	MPC · JPL
654726	2015 DF_{149}	—	February 7, 2015	Mount Lemmon	Mount Lemmon Survey	·	2.1 km	MPC · JPL
654727	2015 DZ_{153}	—	January 16, 2005	Kitt Peak	Spacewatch	GEF	1.6 km	MPC · JPL
654728	2015 DN_{154}	—	December 20, 2004	Mount Lemmon	Mount Lemmon Survey	·	2.1 km	MPC · JPL
654729	2015 DC_{156}	—	September 14, 2007	Mount Lemmon	Mount Lemmon Survey	EOS	1.4 km	MPC · JPL
654730	2015 DP_{163}	—	February 18, 2015	Haleakala	Pan-STARRS 1	·	1.4 km	MPC · JPL
654731	2015 DR_{164}	—	January 23, 2015	Haleakala	Pan-STARRS 1	EOS	1.3 km	MPC · JPL
654732	2015 DY_{164}	—	November 2, 2013	Mount Lemmon	Mount Lemmon Survey	·	1.6 km	MPC · JPL
654733	2015 DG_{165}	—	February 18, 2015	Haleakala	Pan-STARRS 1	·	1.1 km	MPC · JPL
654734	2015 DU_{165}	—	March 28, 2012	Kitt Peak	Spacewatch	·	610 m	MPC · JPL
654735	2015 DO_{166}	—	May 5, 2006	Kitt Peak	Spacewatch	·	1.8 km	MPC · JPL
654736	2015 DW_{173}	—	October 30, 2008	Kitt Peak	Spacewatch	EOS	1.5 km	MPC · JPL
654737	2015 DT_{175}	—	January 10, 2014	Kitt Peak	Spacewatch	·	2.8 km	MPC · JPL
654738	2015 DM_{176}	—	March 4, 2011	Mount Lemmon	Mount Lemmon Survey	·	1.7 km	MPC · JPL
654739	2015 DE_{178}	—	April 1, 2011	Kitt Peak	Spacewatch	AGN	940 m	MPC · JPL
654740	2015 DQ_{178}	—	October 21, 2008	Kitt Peak	Spacewatch	·	1.8 km	MPC · JPL
654741	2015 DR_{178}	—	January 24, 2015	Haleakala	Pan-STARRS 1	·	1.4 km	MPC · JPL
654742	2015 DY_{179}	—	June 15, 2007	Kitt Peak	Spacewatch	·	1.7 km	MPC · JPL
654743	2015 DM_{180}	—	November 1, 2013	Mount Lemmon	Mount Lemmon Survey	KON	2.2 km	MPC · JPL
654744	2015 DP_{180}	—	November 30, 2014	Haleakala	Pan-STARRS 1	EUN	1.1 km	MPC · JPL
654745	2015 DN_{183}	—	February 20, 2015	Haleakala	Pan-STARRS 1	GAL	1.3 km	MPC · JPL
654746	2015 DE_{187}	—	November 24, 2008	Kitt Peak	Spacewatch	·	2.2 km	MPC · JPL
654747	2015 DA_{191}	—	October 25, 2013	Mount Lemmon	Mount Lemmon Survey	·	1.2 km	MPC · JPL
654748	2015 DX_{191}	—	February 20, 2015	Haleakala	Pan-STARRS 1	·	2.0 km	MPC · JPL
654749	2015 DF_{192}	—	February 18, 2015	Mount Lemmon	Mount Lemmon Survey	·	2.1 km	MPC · JPL
654750	2015 DH_{192}	—	November 1, 2013	Kitt Peak	Spacewatch	·	1.8 km	MPC · JPL
654751	2015 DN_{192}	—	February 20, 2015	Haleakala	Pan-STARRS 1	·	1.9 km	MPC · JPL
654752	2015 DD_{195}	—	March 25, 2007	Mount Lemmon	Mount Lemmon Survey	·	1.8 km	MPC · JPL
654753	2015 DW_{196}	—	May 22, 2006	Mount Lemmon	Mount Lemmon Survey	·	1.8 km	MPC · JPL
654754	2015 DP_{201}	—	January 21, 2015	Haleakala	Pan-STARRS 1	·	1.6 km	MPC · JPL
654755	2015 DZ_{201}	—	March 26, 2011	Kitt Peak	Spacewatch	·	1.8 km	MPC · JPL
654756	2015 DR_{202}	—	December 1, 2003	Kitt Peak	Spacewatch	615	1.5 km	MPC · JPL
654757	2015 DO_{206}	—	January 23, 2015	Haleakala	Pan-STARRS 1	·	610 m	MPC · JPL
654758	2015 DW_{210}	—	October 15, 2001	Palomar	NEAT	EOS	2.1 km	MPC · JPL
654759	2015 DK_{211}	—	December 4, 2010	Mount Lemmon	Mount Lemmon Survey	·	600 m	MPC · JPL
654760	2015 DT_{212}	—	January 30, 2008	Mount Lemmon	Mount Lemmon Survey	·	590 m	MPC · JPL
654761	2015 DJ_{213}	—	December 30, 2013	Kitt Peak	Spacewatch	EOS	1.6 km	MPC · JPL
654762	2015 DR_{213}	—	February 23, 2015	Haleakala	Pan-STARRS 1	·	2.2 km	MPC · JPL
654763	2015 DG_{214}	—	January 27, 2011	Catalina	CSS	·	1.3 km	MPC · JPL
654764	2015 DV_{216}	—	February 25, 2015	Haleakala	Pan-STARRS 1	·	1.7 km	MPC · JPL
654765	2015 DO_{217}	—	August 4, 2002	Palomar	NEAT	·	2.8 km	MPC · JPL
654766	2015 DP_{217}	—	October 1, 2013	Calar Alto-CASADO	Mottola, S., Proffe, G.	·	650 m	MPC · JPL
654767	2015 DJ_{221}	—	August 3, 2011	Haleakala	Pan-STARRS 1	·	2.0 km	MPC · JPL
654768	2015 DB_{222}	—	September 13, 2012	Mount Lemmon	Mount Lemmon Survey	·	2.0 km	MPC · JPL
654769	2015 DS_{225}	—	February 16, 2015	Haleakala	Pan-STARRS 1	L4	7.3 km	MPC · JPL
654770	2015 DD_{228}	—	February 24, 2015	Haleakala	Pan-STARRS 1	·	2.5 km	MPC · JPL
654771	2015 DS_{228}	—	September 26, 2003	Apache Point	SDSS	AGN	1.2 km	MPC · JPL
654772	2015 DU_{228}	—	March 10, 2005	Mount Lemmon	Mount Lemmon Survey	KOR	1.4 km	MPC · JPL
654773	2015 DY_{228}	—	October 25, 2008	Mount Lemmon	Mount Lemmon Survey	KOR	1.3 km	MPC · JPL
654774	2015 DJ_{229}	—	January 17, 2008	Mount Lemmon	Mount Lemmon Survey	·	3.4 km	MPC · JPL
654775	2015 DY_{230}	—	November 19, 2008	Mount Lemmon	Mount Lemmon Survey	KOR	1.4 km	MPC · JPL
654776	2015 DE_{231}	—	October 10, 2012	Mount Lemmon	Mount Lemmon Survey	EOS	1.5 km	MPC · JPL
654777	2015 DK_{231}	—	August 10, 2007	Kitt Peak	Spacewatch	KOR	1.2 km	MPC · JPL
654778	2015 DB_{234}	—	November 26, 2013	Mount Lemmon	Mount Lemmon Survey	AGN	870 m	MPC · JPL
654779	2015 DE_{235}	—	February 27, 2015	Haleakala	Pan-STARRS 1	KOR	1.1 km	MPC · JPL
654780	2015 DW_{238}	—	February 16, 2015	Haleakala	Pan-STARRS 1	·	1.7 km	MPC · JPL
654781	2015 DM_{239}	—	February 16, 2015	Haleakala	Pan-STARRS 1	·	1.3 km	MPC · JPL
654782	2015 DX_{240}	—	January 21, 2015	Haleakala	Pan-STARRS 1	EOS	1.4 km	MPC · JPL
654783	2015 DH_{242}	—	January 21, 2015	Haleakala	Pan-STARRS 1	·	2.5 km	MPC · JPL
654784	2015 DL_{245}	—	February 23, 2015	Haleakala	Pan-STARRS 1	GEF	1.0 km	MPC · JPL
654785	2015 DO_{245}	—	January 25, 2015	Haleakala	Pan-STARRS 1	·	1.9 km	MPC · JPL
654786	2015 DT_{245}	—	January 23, 2015	Haleakala	Pan-STARRS 1	·	2.1 km	MPC · JPL
654787	2015 DX_{247}	—	January 23, 2015	Haleakala	Pan-STARRS 1	KOR	1.3 km	MPC · JPL
654788	2015 DD_{250}	—	February 16, 2015	Haleakala	Pan-STARRS 1	KOR	1.1 km	MPC · JPL
654789	2015 DP_{250}	—	February 20, 2015	Haleakala	Pan-STARRS 1	·	3.4 km	MPC · JPL
654790	2015 DD_{252}	—	February 16, 2015	Haleakala	Pan-STARRS 1	·	2.2 km	MPC · JPL
654791	2015 DZ_{252}	—	February 27, 2015	Haleakala	Pan-STARRS 1	·	2.3 km	MPC · JPL
654792	2015 DH_{259}	—	February 17, 2015	Haleakala	Pan-STARRS 1	·	1.6 km	MPC · JPL
654793	2015 DS_{264}	—	February 17, 2015	Haleakala	Pan-STARRS 1	KOR	1.3 km	MPC · JPL
654794	2015 DX_{264}	—	February 16, 2015	Haleakala	Pan-STARRS 1	·	2.0 km	MPC · JPL
654795	2015 DB_{265}	—	February 18, 2015	Haleakala	Pan-STARRS 1	·	1.4 km	MPC · JPL
654796	2015 DU_{265}	—	February 20, 2015	Haleakala	Pan-STARRS 1	·	1.3 km	MPC · JPL
654797	2015 DA_{266}	—	February 24, 2015	Haleakala	Pan-STARRS 1	·	1.9 km	MPC · JPL
654798	2015 DB_{270}	—	February 16, 2015	Haleakala	Pan-STARRS 1	EOS	1.5 km	MPC · JPL
654799	2015 DZ_{272}	—	February 16, 2015	Haleakala	Pan-STARRS 1	·	1.5 km	MPC · JPL
654800	2015 DE_{273}	—	February 20, 2015	Haleakala	Pan-STARRS 1	·	2.2 km	MPC · JPL

== 654801–654900 ==
back to top

Designation			Discovery			Properties		Ref
Permanent	Provisional	Named after	Date	Site	Discoverer(s)	Category	Diam.	Ref
654801	2015 DN_{277}	—	February 23, 2015	Haleakala	Pan-STARRS 1	·	1.6 km	MPC · JPL
654802	2015 DC_{281}	—	February 23, 2015	Haleakala	Pan-STARRS 1	·	1.9 km	MPC · JPL
654803	2015 DJ_{286}	—	February 16, 2015	Haleakala	Pan-STARRS 1	KOR	1.2 km	MPC · JPL
654804	2015 DK_{286}	—	January 28, 2015	Haleakala	Pan-STARRS 1	EOS	1.5 km	MPC · JPL
654805	2015 DO_{288}	—	February 23, 2015	Haleakala	Pan-STARRS 1	·	1.8 km	MPC · JPL
654806	2015 DO_{293}	—	January 22, 2015	Haleakala	Pan-STARRS 1	EOS	1.5 km	MPC · JPL
654807	2015 DJ_{296}	—	February 16, 2015	Haleakala	Pan-STARRS 1	·	1.4 km	MPC · JPL
654808	2015 DD_{297}	—	February 23, 2015	Haleakala	Pan-STARRS 1	H	450 m	MPC · JPL
654809	2015 DK_{303}	—	January 27, 2015	Haleakala	Pan-STARRS 1	·	1.8 km	MPC · JPL
654810	2015 DB_{304}	—	January 22, 2015	Haleakala	Pan-STARRS 1	·	1.3 km	MPC · JPL
654811	2015 DE_{306}	—	February 25, 2015	Haleakala	Pan-STARRS 1	EOS	1.4 km	MPC · JPL
654812	2015 DC_{311}	—	February 19, 2015	Haleakala	Pan-STARRS 1	AGN	870 m	MPC · JPL
654813	2015 EK_{2}	—	March 13, 2010	Mount Lemmon	Mount Lemmon Survey	EOS	1.4 km	MPC · JPL
654814	2015 EQ_{4}	—	April 30, 2011	Haleakala	Pan-STARRS 1	·	1.7 km	MPC · JPL
654815	2015 EN_{6}	—	March 13, 2015	Mount Lemmon	Mount Lemmon Survey	·	1.9 km	MPC · JPL
654816	2015 EU_{6}	—	March 3, 2006	Catalina	CSS	·	1.0 km	MPC · JPL
654817	2015 EY_{8}	—	February 25, 2006	Kitt Peak	Spacewatch	·	1.1 km	MPC · JPL
654818	2015 EA_{10}	—	October 14, 2004	Palomar	NEAT	·	2.1 km	MPC · JPL
654819	2015 EF_{10}	—	November 5, 2007	Kitt Peak	Spacewatch	·	570 m	MPC · JPL
654820	2015 EH_{11}	—	September 22, 2008	Mount Lemmon	Mount Lemmon Survey	·	1.7 km	MPC · JPL
654821	2015 EB_{14}	—	January 22, 2015	Haleakala	Pan-STARRS 1	·	1.5 km	MPC · JPL
654822	2015 EP_{15}	—	February 14, 2015	Mount Lemmon	Mount Lemmon Survey	·	1.6 km	MPC · JPL
654823	2015 ED_{16}	—	March 29, 2012	Haleakala	Pan-STARRS 1	·	650 m	MPC · JPL
654824	2015 EN_{18}	—	November 9, 2013	Haleakala	Pan-STARRS 1	·	1.7 km	MPC · JPL
654825	2015 ED_{19}	—	October 4, 1999	Kitt Peak	Spacewatch	AGN	1.1 km	MPC · JPL
654826	2015 EA_{20}	—	January 25, 2015	Haleakala	Pan-STARRS 1	·	1.7 km	MPC · JPL
654827	2015 EK_{22}	—	September 21, 2008	Kitt Peak	Spacewatch	·	1.7 km	MPC · JPL
654828	2015 EJ_{23}	—	September 8, 2008	Kitt Peak	Spacewatch	AGN	1.2 km	MPC · JPL
654829	2015 EW_{24}	—	February 17, 2015	Haleakala	Pan-STARRS 1	HOF	2.2 km	MPC · JPL
654830	2015 ER_{27}	—	April 5, 2011	Kitt Peak	Spacewatch	·	1.2 km	MPC · JPL
654831	2015 EW_{32}	—	March 14, 2015	Haleakala	Pan-STARRS 1	·	1.6 km	MPC · JPL
654832	2015 EK_{37}	—	November 9, 2013	Mount Lemmon	Mount Lemmon Survey	AGN	1.0 km	MPC · JPL
654833	2015 EX_{38}	—	March 10, 2005	Kitt Peak	Deep Ecliptic Survey	KOR	1.2 km	MPC · JPL
654834	2015 EL_{40}	—	February 17, 2015	Haleakala	Pan-STARRS 1	·	510 m	MPC · JPL
654835	2015 EA_{42}	—	April 2, 2011	Kitt Peak	Spacewatch	·	1.6 km	MPC · JPL
654836	2015 EJ_{47}	—	September 23, 2008	Mount Lemmon	Mount Lemmon Survey	·	1.4 km	MPC · JPL
654837	2015 ES_{47}	—	March 14, 2015	Haleakala	Pan-STARRS 1	HOF	2.1 km	MPC · JPL
654838	2015 EO_{49}	—	February 16, 2015	Haleakala	Pan-STARRS 1	·	530 m	MPC · JPL
654839	2015 EX_{50}	—	November 1, 2013	Mount Lemmon	Mount Lemmon Survey	AGN	1.1 km	MPC · JPL
654840	2015 EQ_{53}	—	January 24, 2015	Haleakala	Pan-STARRS 1	·	1.7 km	MPC · JPL
654841	2015 EV_{54}	—	March 2, 2011	Kitt Peak	Spacewatch	MAR	1.1 km	MPC · JPL
654842	2015 EX_{54}	—	August 29, 2006	Catalina	CSS	·	700 m	MPC · JPL
654843	2015 ES_{56}	—	August 13, 2012	Haleakala	Pan-STARRS 1	·	1.7 km	MPC · JPL
654844	2015 EJ_{60}	—	March 15, 2015	Kitt Peak	Spacewatch	·	620 m	MPC · JPL
654845	2015 ET_{60}	—	March 15, 2015	Haleakala	Pan-STARRS 1	L4	7.9 km	MPC · JPL
654846	2015 EZ_{60}	—	February 20, 2015	Haleakala	Pan-STARRS 1	·	1.9 km	MPC · JPL
654847	2015 EQ_{62}	—	April 14, 2008	Catalina	CSS	·	950 m	MPC · JPL
654848	2015 EE_{66}	—	October 1, 2013	Kitt Peak	Spacewatch	·	1.6 km	MPC · JPL
654849	2015 EC_{68}	—	October 24, 2013	Mount Lemmon	Mount Lemmon Survey	·	1.5 km	MPC · JPL
654850	2015 EQ_{69}	—	February 16, 2015	Haleakala	Pan-STARRS 1	KOR	1.0 km	MPC · JPL
654851	2015 ES_{72}	—	November 11, 2004	Kitt Peak	Spacewatch	AGN	1.2 km	MPC · JPL
654852	2015 EZ_{76}	—	March 10, 2015	Mount Lemmon	Mount Lemmon Survey	·	1.3 km	MPC · JPL
654853	2015 FC_{7}	—	January 20, 2015	Haleakala	Pan-STARRS 1	·	2.0 km	MPC · JPL
654854	2015 FQ_{7}	—	March 16, 2015	Haleakala	Pan-STARRS 1	·	2.4 km	MPC · JPL
654855	2015 FW_{10}	—	January 10, 2014	Kitt Peak	Spacewatch	·	2.4 km	MPC · JPL
654856	2015 FB_{14}	—	November 12, 2012	Mount Lemmon	Mount Lemmon Survey	·	2.3 km	MPC · JPL
654857	2015 FS_{18}	—	December 5, 2007	Mount Lemmon	Mount Lemmon Survey	·	2.3 km	MPC · JPL
654858	2015 FK_{22}	—	June 17, 2010	Mount Lemmon	Mount Lemmon Survey	·	2.7 km	MPC · JPL
654859	2015 FL_{22}	—	May 11, 2010	Mount Lemmon	Mount Lemmon Survey	·	2.8 km	MPC · JPL
654860	2015 FV_{31}	—	March 10, 2015	Mount Lemmon	Mount Lemmon Survey	·	1.5 km	MPC · JPL
654861	2015 FD_{32}	—	March 16, 2015	Haleakala	Pan-STARRS 1	BRA	1.3 km	MPC · JPL
654862	2015 FZ_{32}	—	May 3, 2011	Mount Lemmon	Mount Lemmon Survey	TIN	920 m	MPC · JPL
654863	2015 FG_{38}	—	March 17, 2015	Haleakala	Pan-STARRS 1	·	1.9 km	MPC · JPL
654864	2015 FO_{39}	—	March 16, 2015	Kitt Peak	Spacewatch	·	580 m	MPC · JPL
654865	2015 FM_{40}	—	March 17, 2015	Haleakala	Pan-STARRS 1	·	520 m	MPC · JPL
654866	2015 FP_{43}	—	March 4, 2005	Mount Lemmon	Mount Lemmon Survey	·	470 m	MPC · JPL
654867	2015 FA_{48}	—	September 17, 2004	Kitt Peak	Spacewatch	·	1.6 km	MPC · JPL
654868	2015 FB_{50}	—	May 29, 2009	Mount Lemmon	Mount Lemmon Survey	·	520 m	MPC · JPL
654869	2015 FH_{50}	—	November 11, 2013	Kitt Peak	Spacewatch	·	1.9 km	MPC · JPL
654870	2015 FR_{50}	—	January 18, 2015	Haleakala	Pan-STARRS 1	TIR	2.6 km	MPC · JPL
654871	2015 FT_{53}	—	February 2, 2006	Kitt Peak	Spacewatch	·	1.9 km	MPC · JPL
654872	2015 FZ_{53}	—	May 29, 2008	Mount Lemmon	Mount Lemmon Survey	·	2.4 km	MPC · JPL
654873	2015 FB_{54}	—	May 27, 2012	Mount Lemmon	Mount Lemmon Survey	TIN	1.3 km	MPC · JPL
654874	2015 FH_{56}	—	January 24, 2015	Haleakala	Pan-STARRS 1	·	2.6 km	MPC · JPL
654875	2015 FV_{56}	—	January 24, 2015	Haleakala	Pan-STARRS 1	·	2.4 km	MPC · JPL
654876	2015 FH_{66}	—	January 20, 2015	Haleakala	Pan-STARRS 1	·	1.7 km	MPC · JPL
654877	2015 FX_{68}	—	January 13, 2005	Kitt Peak	Spacewatch	·	2.4 km	MPC · JPL
654878	2015 FG_{69}	—	December 12, 2012	Mount Lemmon	Mount Lemmon Survey	L4	7.0 km	MPC · JPL
654879	2015 FL_{69}	—	May 11, 2010	Mount Lemmon	Mount Lemmon Survey	·	2.4 km	MPC · JPL
654880	2015 FQ_{72}	—	February 14, 2009	Mount Lemmon	Mount Lemmon Survey	·	1.8 km	MPC · JPL
654881	2015 FU_{75}	—	April 16, 2005	Kitt Peak	Spacewatch	·	1.5 km	MPC · JPL
654882	2015 FB_{78}	—	August 31, 2005	Kitt Peak	Spacewatch	·	1.3 km	MPC · JPL
654883	2015 FD_{79}	—	March 18, 2015	Haleakala	Pan-STARRS 1	PHO	1.0 km	MPC · JPL
654884	2015 FO_{80}	—	February 20, 2015	Haleakala	Pan-STARRS 1	·	1.6 km	MPC · JPL
654885	2015 FN_{82}	—	August 12, 2012	Kitt Peak	Spacewatch	EOS	1.8 km	MPC · JPL
654886	2015 FK_{84}	—	January 17, 2005	Kitt Peak	Spacewatch	BRA	1.5 km	MPC · JPL
654887	2015 FF_{86}	—	March 20, 2015	Haleakala	Pan-STARRS 1	·	1.8 km	MPC · JPL
654888	2015 FL_{86}	—	March 20, 2015	Haleakala	Pan-STARRS 1	·	1.7 km	MPC · JPL
654889	2015 FG_{87}	—	October 17, 2003	Kitt Peak	Spacewatch	·	750 m	MPC · JPL
654890	2015 FK_{87}	—	May 20, 2012	Haleakala	Pan-STARRS 1	·	720 m	MPC · JPL
654891	2015 FY_{87}	—	August 6, 2012	Haleakala	Pan-STARRS 1	·	2.2 km	MPC · JPL
654892	2015 FF_{88}	—	April 19, 2012	Mount Lemmon	Mount Lemmon Survey	·	600 m	MPC · JPL
654893	2015 FU_{88}	—	February 23, 2015	Haleakala	Pan-STARRS 1	·	1.9 km	MPC · JPL
654894	2015 FY_{89}	—	February 24, 2015	Haleakala	Pan-STARRS 1	EOS	1.4 km	MPC · JPL
654895	2015 FK_{93}	—	January 20, 2015	Haleakala	Pan-STARRS 1	·	520 m	MPC · JPL
654896	2015 FS_{94}	—	January 20, 2015	Haleakala	Pan-STARRS 1	·	1.5 km	MPC · JPL
654897	2015 FJ_{98}	—	January 20, 2015	Haleakala	Pan-STARRS 1	·	1.8 km	MPC · JPL
654898	2015 FR_{102}	—	February 17, 2004	Kitt Peak	Spacewatch	·	1.9 km	MPC · JPL
654899	2015 FC_{105}	—	January 22, 2015	Haleakala	Pan-STARRS 1	·	1.5 km	MPC · JPL
654900	2015 FY_{105}	—	August 13, 2012	Kitt Peak	Spacewatch	·	1.7 km	MPC · JPL

== 654901–655000 ==
back to top

Designation			Discovery			Properties		Ref
Permanent	Provisional	Named after	Date	Site	Discoverer(s)	Category	Diam.	Ref
654901	2015 FA_{107}	—	February 25, 2015	Haleakala	Pan-STARRS 1	·	1.4 km	MPC · JPL
654902	2015 FF_{107}	—	January 22, 2004	Socorro	LINEAR	·	870 m	MPC · JPL
654903	2015 FS_{107}	—	February 1, 2009	Kitt Peak	Spacewatch	·	2.7 km	MPC · JPL
654904	2015 FR_{108}	—	October 11, 2012	Haleakala	Pan-STARRS 1	·	1.7 km	MPC · JPL
654905	2015 FO_{109}	—	September 4, 2008	Kitt Peak	Spacewatch	L4	6.3 km	MPC · JPL
654906	2015 FW_{109}	—	March 20, 2015	Haleakala	Pan-STARRS 1	·	590 m	MPC · JPL
654907	2015 FK_{111}	—	March 20, 2015	Haleakala	Pan-STARRS 1	L4	7.7 km	MPC · JPL
654908	2015 FB_{112}	—	March 20, 2015	Haleakala	Pan-STARRS 1	·	1.5 km	MPC · JPL
654909	2015 FR_{114}	—	February 25, 2015	Haleakala	Pan-STARRS 1	EOS	1.8 km	MPC · JPL
654910	2015 FS_{120}	—	April 20, 2012	Mount Lemmon	Mount Lemmon Survey	·	640 m	MPC · JPL
654911	2015 FX_{120}	—	February 17, 2015	Haleakala	Pan-STARRS 1	·	630 m	MPC · JPL
654912	2015 FA_{122}	—	May 26, 2006	Catalina	CSS	·	1.4 km	MPC · JPL
654913	2015 FN_{122}	—	April 27, 2006	Cerro Tololo	Deep Ecliptic Survey	·	1.4 km	MPC · JPL
654914	2015 FN_{123}	—	September 27, 2006	Kitt Peak	Spacewatch	·	2.7 km	MPC · JPL
654915	2015 FS_{124}	—	October 8, 2008	Mount Lemmon	Mount Lemmon Survey	·	1.6 km	MPC · JPL
654916	2015 FP_{128}	—	January 19, 2015	Haleakala	Pan-STARRS 1	·	1.8 km	MPC · JPL
654917	2015 FW_{128}	—	October 4, 2013	Mount Lemmon	Mount Lemmon Survey	·	1.8 km	MPC · JPL
654918	2015 FA_{129}	—	October 10, 2008	Mount Lemmon	Mount Lemmon Survey	·	2.6 km	MPC · JPL
654919	2015 FY_{133}	—	September 16, 2006	Kitt Peak	Spacewatch	PHO	930 m	MPC · JPL
654920	2015 FE_{134}	—	January 22, 2015	Haleakala	Pan-STARRS 1	·	600 m	MPC · JPL
654921	2015 FW_{135}	—	October 13, 2010	Mount Lemmon	Mount Lemmon Survey	·	610 m	MPC · JPL
654922	2015 FG_{136}	—	October 23, 2008	Kitt Peak	Spacewatch	·	1.7 km	MPC · JPL
654923	2015 FB_{137}	—	April 30, 2006	Kitt Peak	Spacewatch	AGN	950 m	MPC · JPL
654924	2015 FA_{143}	—	September 20, 2009	Kitt Peak	Spacewatch	L4	8.1 km	MPC · JPL
654925	2015 FJ_{144}	—	March 21, 2015	Haleakala	Pan-STARRS 1	KOR	1.2 km	MPC · JPL
654926	2015 FR_{145}	—	March 21, 2015	Haleakala	Pan-STARRS 1	THM	1.7 km	MPC · JPL
654927	2015 FD_{147}	—	October 17, 2012	Haleakala	Pan-STARRS 1	·	1.6 km	MPC · JPL
654928	2015 FE_{149}	—	January 3, 2014	Mount Lemmon	Mount Lemmon Survey	·	1.5 km	MPC · JPL
654929	2015 FQ_{150}	—	March 21, 2015	Haleakala	Pan-STARRS 1	·	1.6 km	MPC · JPL
654930	2015 FH_{153}	—	March 21, 2015	Haleakala	Pan-STARRS 1	·	1.5 km	MPC · JPL
654931	2015 FN_{153}	—	September 27, 2009	Mount Lemmon	Mount Lemmon Survey	·	570 m	MPC · JPL
654932	2015 FB_{155}	—	January 23, 2015	Haleakala	Pan-STARRS 1	·	560 m	MPC · JPL
654933	2015 FQ_{156}	—	November 29, 2013	Mount Lemmon	Mount Lemmon Survey	EOS	1.5 km	MPC · JPL
654934	2015 FV_{157}	—	March 21, 2015	Haleakala	Pan-STARRS 1	·	1.8 km	MPC · JPL
654935	2015 FH_{158}	—	October 3, 2013	Haleakala	Pan-STARRS 1	·	560 m	MPC · JPL
654936	2015 FS_{158}	—	November 2, 2013	Mount Lemmon	Mount Lemmon Survey	·	1.5 km	MPC · JPL
654937	2015 FH_{159}	—	October 16, 2012	Mount Lemmon	Mount Lemmon Survey	·	1.4 km	MPC · JPL
654938	2015 FT_{159}	—	May 16, 2012	Mount Lemmon	Mount Lemmon Survey	·	610 m	MPC · JPL
654939	2015 FC_{162}	—	March 21, 2015	Haleakala	Pan-STARRS 1	VER	2.0 km	MPC · JPL
654940	2015 FK_{163}	—	March 21, 2015	Haleakala	Pan-STARRS 1	·	510 m	MPC · JPL
654941	2015 FT_{163}	—	October 19, 2006	Kitt Peak	Spacewatch	·	3.1 km	MPC · JPL
654942	2015 FH_{164}	—	March 8, 2008	Mount Lemmon	Mount Lemmon Survey	·	530 m	MPC · JPL
654943	2015 FK_{164}	—	March 21, 2015	Haleakala	Pan-STARRS 1	·	2.4 km	MPC · JPL
654944	2015 FY_{164}	—	March 21, 2015	Haleakala	Pan-STARRS 1	·	1.4 km	MPC · JPL
654945	2015 FX_{168}	—	September 12, 2007	Mount Lemmon	Mount Lemmon Survey	EOS	1.4 km	MPC · JPL
654946	2015 FC_{169}	—	January 11, 2008	Kitt Peak	Spacewatch	·	550 m	MPC · JPL
654947	2015 FY_{169}	—	December 22, 2008	Kitt Peak	Spacewatch	·	1.3 km	MPC · JPL
654948	2015 FA_{172}	—	January 26, 2011	Mount Lemmon	Mount Lemmon Survey	·	640 m	MPC · JPL
654949	2015 FC_{173}	—	October 8, 2012	Haleakala	Pan-STARRS 1	·	1.8 km	MPC · JPL
654950	2015 FB_{174}	—	October 6, 2012	Haleakala	Pan-STARRS 1	EOS	1.6 km	MPC · JPL
654951	2015 FA_{175}	—	March 21, 2015	Haleakala	Pan-STARRS 1	·	1.7 km	MPC · JPL
654952	2015 FB_{175}	—	November 16, 2009	Mount Lemmon	Mount Lemmon Survey	L4	7.1 km	MPC · JPL
654953	2015 FU_{175}	—	January 1, 2014	Kitt Peak	Spacewatch	·	2.3 km	MPC · JPL
654954	2015 FL_{176}	—	September 19, 1998	Apache Point	SDSS	·	670 m	MPC · JPL
654955	2015 FM_{180}	—	September 6, 2013	Mount Lemmon	Mount Lemmon Survey	·	550 m	MPC · JPL
654956	2015 FZ_{183}	—	November 28, 2013	Mount Lemmon	Mount Lemmon Survey	·	2.3 km	MPC · JPL
654957	2015 FN_{191}	—	January 18, 2015	Haleakala	Pan-STARRS 1	·	1.8 km	MPC · JPL
654958	2015 FU_{191}	—	February 23, 2015	Haleakala	Pan-STARRS 1	·	1.6 km	MPC · JPL
654959	2015 FQ_{194}	—	September 28, 2006	Kitt Peak	Spacewatch	·	630 m	MPC · JPL
654960	2015 FW_{194}	—	October 9, 2010	Kitt Peak	Spacewatch	·	560 m	MPC · JPL
654961	2015 FY_{194}	—	November 29, 2013	Mount Lemmon	Mount Lemmon Survey	AGN	970 m	MPC · JPL
654962	2015 FO_{195}	—	September 25, 2008	Mount Lemmon	Mount Lemmon Survey	·	2.3 km	MPC · JPL
654963	2015 FA_{197}	—	October 5, 2013	Mount Lemmon	Mount Lemmon Survey	·	1.5 km	MPC · JPL
654964	2015 FR_{198}	—	January 1, 2009	Mount Lemmon	Mount Lemmon Survey	EOS	1.8 km	MPC · JPL
654965	2015 FD_{199}	—	April 29, 2012	Kitt Peak	Spacewatch	·	630 m	MPC · JPL
654966	2015 FG_{199}	—	October 3, 2013	Kitt Peak	Spacewatch	·	1.7 km	MPC · JPL
654967	2015 FN_{199}	—	September 26, 2008	Kitt Peak	Spacewatch	·	1.6 km	MPC · JPL
654968	2015 FX_{199}	—	September 25, 2008	Mount Lemmon	Mount Lemmon Survey	·	1.5 km	MPC · JPL
654969	2015 FC_{200}	—	November 17, 2008	Kitt Peak	Spacewatch	·	1.7 km	MPC · JPL
654970	2015 FG_{200}	—	September 9, 2007	Mount Lemmon	Mount Lemmon Survey	·	600 m	MPC · JPL
654971	2015 FV_{202}	—	September 24, 2012	Mount Lemmon	Mount Lemmon Survey	·	1.7 km	MPC · JPL
654972	2015 FE_{205}	—	February 16, 2015	Haleakala	Pan-STARRS 1	EUN	1.1 km	MPC · JPL
654973	2015 FS_{205}	—	September 13, 2007	Kitt Peak	Spacewatch	·	1.8 km	MPC · JPL
654974	2015 FR_{207}	—	February 16, 2015	Haleakala	Pan-STARRS 1	KOR	1.1 km	MPC · JPL
654975	2015 FN_{211}	—	October 15, 2012	Haleakala	Pan-STARRS 1	EOS	1.5 km	MPC · JPL
654976	2015 FG_{212}	—	February 16, 2015	Haleakala	Pan-STARRS 1	·	2.6 km	MPC · JPL
654977	2015 FC_{213}	—	February 16, 2015	Haleakala	Pan-STARRS 1	·	1.7 km	MPC · JPL
654978	2015 FM_{218}	—	September 19, 2006	Kitt Peak	Spacewatch	THM	2.0 km	MPC · JPL
654979	2015 FZ_{218}	—	September 15, 2006	Kitt Peak	Spacewatch	·	2.2 km	MPC · JPL
654980	2015 FP_{220}	—	January 12, 2010	Kitt Peak	Spacewatch	AGN	1.4 km	MPC · JPL
654981	2015 FV_{225}	—	September 26, 2008	Kitt Peak	Spacewatch	·	1.0 km	MPC · JPL
654982	2015 FX_{225}	—	November 5, 2005	Mount Lemmon	Mount Lemmon Survey	·	1.1 km	MPC · JPL
654983	2015 FZ_{226}	—	March 23, 2015	Haleakala	Pan-STARRS 1	HOF	2.1 km	MPC · JPL
654984	2015 FC_{227}	—	March 23, 2015	Haleakala	Pan-STARRS 1	·	1.4 km	MPC · JPL
654985	2015 FO_{228}	—	March 23, 2015	Haleakala	Pan-STARRS 1	·	1.4 km	MPC · JPL
654986	2015 FL_{230}	—	March 23, 2015	Haleakala	Pan-STARRS 1	·	2.2 km	MPC · JPL
654987	2015 FA_{233}	—	February 7, 2008	Mount Lemmon	Mount Lemmon Survey	·	640 m	MPC · JPL
654988	2015 FR_{234}	—	April 19, 2012	Mount Lemmon	Mount Lemmon Survey	·	580 m	MPC · JPL
654989	2015 FB_{235}	—	March 11, 2015	Kitt Peak	Spacewatch	·	1.9 km	MPC · JPL
654990	2015 FF_{236}	—	October 2, 2003	Kitt Peak	Spacewatch	·	560 m	MPC · JPL
654991	2015 FG_{238}	—	January 12, 2010	Kitt Peak	Spacewatch	·	1.6 km	MPC · JPL
654992	2015 FR_{238}	—	August 29, 2011	Mayhill-ISON	L. Elenin	·	2.6 km	MPC · JPL
654993	2015 FO_{239}	—	March 28, 1995	Kitt Peak	Spacewatch	·	560 m	MPC · JPL
654994	2015 FA_{241}	—	March 23, 2015	Haleakala	Pan-STARRS 1	·	660 m	MPC · JPL
654995	2015 FJ_{243}	—	October 8, 2008	Catalina	CSS	WIT	1.5 km	MPC · JPL
654996	2015 FB_{245}	—	November 21, 2008	Kitt Peak	Spacewatch	·	1.3 km	MPC · JPL
654997	2015 FO_{246}	—	March 23, 2015	Haleakala	Pan-STARRS 1	·	2.5 km	MPC · JPL
654998	2015 FT_{246}	—	March 23, 2015	Haleakala	Pan-STARRS 1	·	1.7 km	MPC · JPL
654999	2015 FC_{247}	—	May 2, 2012	Charleston	R. Holmes	·	740 m	MPC · JPL
655000	2015 FJ_{251}	—	March 23, 2015	Haleakala	Pan-STARRS 1	·	540 m	MPC · JPL

back to top
