= List of minor planets: 605001–606000 =

The following is a partial list of minor planets, running from minor-planet number 605001 through 606000, inclusive. The primary data for this and other partial lists is based on JPL's "Small-Body Orbital Elements" and data available from the Minor Planet Center. Critical list information is also provided by the MPC, unless otherwise specified from Lowell Observatory. A detailed description of the table's columns and additional sources are given on the main page including a complete list of every page in this series, and a statistical break-up on the dynamical classification of minor planets.

Also see the summary list of all named bodies in numerical and alphabetical order, and the corresponding naming citations for the number range of this particular list. New namings may only be added to this list after official publication, as the preannouncement of names is condemned by the Working Group for Small Bodies Nomenclature of the International Astronomical Union.

Near-Earth obj.	MBA (inner)	MBA (outer)	Centaur
Mars-crosser	MBA (middle)	Jupiter trojan	Trans-Neptunian obj.
Unclassified

== 605001–605100 ==
Designation			Discovery			Properties		Ref
Permanent	Provisional	Named after	Date	Site	Discoverer(s)	Category	Diam.	Ref
605001	2015 XW_{398}	—	September 19, 2014	Haleakala	Pan-STARRS 1	·	1.2 km	MPC · JPL
605002	2015 XW_{402}	—	December 6, 2015	Mount Lemmon	Mount Lemmon Survey	·	3.1 km	MPC · JPL
605003	2015 XZ_{408}	—	September 18, 2014	Haleakala	Pan-STARRS 1	·	2.2 km	MPC · JPL
605004	2015 XT_{421}	—	October 18, 2009	Mount Lemmon	Mount Lemmon Survey	·	2.5 km	MPC · JPL
605005	2015 XJ_{441}	—	March 27, 2012	Mount Lemmon	Mount Lemmon Survey	EOS	1.5 km	MPC · JPL
605006	2015 XS_{448}	—	June 17, 2014	Mount Lemmon	Mount Lemmon Survey	·	510 m	MPC · JPL
605007	2015 XE_{450}	—	December 8, 2015	Haleakala	Pan-STARRS 1	·	1.8 km	MPC · JPL
605008	2015 XW_{460}	—	December 5, 2015	Haleakala	Pan-STARRS 1	·	2.5 km	MPC · JPL
605009	2015 XS_{478}	—	August 23, 2014	Haleakala	Pan-STARRS 1	·	2.2 km	MPC · JPL
605010	2015 XY_{478}	—	November 13, 2010	Mount Lemmon	Mount Lemmon Survey	·	1.5 km	MPC · JPL
605011	2015 YM	—	August 4, 2001	Palomar	NEAT	H	820 m	MPC · JPL
605012	2015 YD_{21}	—	December 17, 2015	Haleakala	Pan-STARRS 1	H	480 m	MPC · JPL
605013	2015 YZ_{25}	—	April 10, 2010	Kitt Peak	Spacewatch	·	590 m	MPC · JPL
605014	2015 YU_{29}	—	December 16, 2015	Haleakala	Pan-STARRS 1	H	500 m	MPC · JPL
605015	2016 AN_{3}	—	November 30, 2015	Catalina	CSS	·	990 m	MPC · JPL
605016	2016 AR_{5}	—	January 2, 2016	Mount Lemmon	Mount Lemmon Survey	·	2.4 km	MPC · JPL
605017	2016 AW_{24}	—	February 11, 2011	Mount Lemmon	Mount Lemmon Survey	·	2.1 km	MPC · JPL
605018	2016 AL_{30}	—	March 15, 2013	Mount Lemmon	Mount Lemmon Survey	·	660 m	MPC · JPL
605019	2016 AK_{33}	—	April 10, 2013	Haleakala	Pan-STARRS 1	·	500 m	MPC · JPL
605020	2016 AF_{34}	—	December 4, 2005	Kitt Peak	Spacewatch	·	530 m	MPC · JPL
605021	2016 AP_{36}	—	October 21, 2008	Kitt Peak	Spacewatch	·	710 m	MPC · JPL
605022	2016 AQ_{41}	—	September 21, 2011	Haleakala	Pan-STARRS 1	·	430 m	MPC · JPL
605023	2016 AF_{50}	—	February 15, 2013	Haleakala	Pan-STARRS 1	·	390 m	MPC · JPL
605024	2016 AL_{58}	—	August 3, 2014	Haleakala	Pan-STARRS 1	·	530 m	MPC · JPL
605025	2016 AH_{62}	—	January 7, 2009	Kitt Peak	Spacewatch	·	660 m	MPC · JPL
605026	2016 AH_{69}	—	December 8, 2010	Mount Lemmon	Mount Lemmon Survey	EOS	2.0 km	MPC · JPL
605027	2016 AH_{73}	—	January 4, 2016	Haleakala	Pan-STARRS 1	EUP	2.8 km	MPC · JPL
605028	2016 AM_{83}	—	June 29, 2014	Mount Lemmon	Mount Lemmon Survey	·	1.8 km	MPC · JPL
605029	2016 AP_{91}	—	August 18, 2014	Haleakala	Pan-STARRS 1	·	2.3 km	MPC · JPL
605030	2016 AO_{119}	—	April 21, 2013	Haleakala	Pan-STARRS 1	·	1.2 km	MPC · JPL
605031	2016 AY_{120}	—	August 6, 2007	Lulin	LUSS	·	4.8 km	MPC · JPL
605032	2016 AD_{132}	—	January 9, 2016	Haleakala	Pan-STARRS 1	T_{j} (2.97)	2.7 km	MPC · JPL
605033	2016 AM_{132}	—	December 13, 2015	Haleakala	Pan-STARRS 1	·	2.2 km	MPC · JPL
605034	2016 AH_{141}	—	April 21, 2013	Haleakala	Pan-STARRS 1	·	1.3 km	MPC · JPL
605035	2016 AV_{147}	—	March 27, 2009	Catalina	CSS	·	1.1 km	MPC · JPL
605036	2016 AO_{151}	—	December 8, 2015	Haleakala	Pan-STARRS 1	·	2.2 km	MPC · JPL
605037	2016 AZ_{159}	—	December 14, 2014	Haleakala	Pan-STARRS 1	·	2.5 km	MPC · JPL
605038	2016 AR_{170}	—	November 26, 2011	Kitt Peak	Spacewatch	V	560 m	MPC · JPL
605039	2016 AT_{172}	—	September 10, 2001	Socorro	LINEAR	H	540 m	MPC · JPL
605040	2016 AB_{177}	—	November 13, 2010	Kitt Peak	Spacewatch	EUN	1.2 km	MPC · JPL
605041	2016 AN_{179}	—	December 9, 2015	Haleakala	Pan-STARRS 1	H	380 m	MPC · JPL
605042	2016 AE_{180}	—	November 24, 2006	Mount Lemmon	Mount Lemmon Survey	·	990 m	MPC · JPL
605043	2016 AW_{181}	—	January 11, 2016	Haleakala	Pan-STARRS 1	·	2.7 km	MPC · JPL
605044	2016 AP_{183}	—	December 8, 2015	Haleakala	Pan-STARRS 1	H	390 m	MPC · JPL
605045	2016 AB_{189}	—	May 12, 2013	Mount Lemmon	Mount Lemmon Survey	·	2.4 km	MPC · JPL
605046	2016 AO_{194}	—	January 3, 2016	Mount Lemmon	Mount Lemmon Survey	H	290 m	MPC · JPL
605047	2016 AA_{196}	—	February 28, 2009	Kitt Peak	Spacewatch	3:2 · SHU	4.7 km	MPC · JPL
605048	2016 AW_{198}	—	January 8, 2016	Haleakala	Pan-STARRS 1	H	350 m	MPC · JPL
605049	2016 AT_{224}	—	January 14, 2016	Haleakala	Pan-STARRS 1	·	600 m	MPC · JPL
605050	2016 AM_{232}	—	May 15, 2013	Haleakala	Pan-STARRS 1	·	720 m	MPC · JPL
605051	2016 AY_{232}	—	January 20, 2009	Mount Lemmon	Mount Lemmon Survey	·	540 m	MPC · JPL
605052	2016 AM_{237}	—	January 8, 2016	Haleakala	Pan-STARRS 1	·	940 m	MPC · JPL
605053	2016 AF_{278}	—	January 15, 2016	Haleakala	Pan-STARRS 1	·	920 m	MPC · JPL
605054	2016 AF_{279}	—	January 11, 2016	Haleakala	Pan-STARRS 1	·	830 m	MPC · JPL
605055	2016 AP_{280}	—	January 15, 2016	Haleakala	Pan-STARRS 1	·	840 m	MPC · JPL
605056	2016 AY_{299}	—	January 4, 2016	Haleakala	Pan-STARRS 1	L5	7.8 km	MPC · JPL
605057	2016 AO_{301}	—	January 8, 2016	Haleakala	Pan-STARRS 1	·	1.6 km	MPC · JPL
605058	2016 AD_{303}	—	January 13, 2016	Mount Lemmon	Mount Lemmon Survey	L5	7.2 km	MPC · JPL
605059	2016 AR_{321}	—	January 7, 2016	Haleakala	Pan-STARRS 1	·	2.7 km	MPC · JPL
605060	2016 AC_{348}	—	January 4, 2016	Haleakala	Pan-STARRS 1	·	1.4 km	MPC · JPL
605061	2016 AN_{350}	—	January 2, 2016	Mount Lemmon	Mount Lemmon Survey	·	970 m	MPC · JPL
605062	2016 AS_{354}	—	January 2, 2016	Mount Lemmon	Mount Lemmon Survey	·	1.2 km	MPC · JPL
605063	2016 BJ	—	January 2, 2016	Mount Lemmon	Mount Lemmon Survey	L5	7.1 km	MPC · JPL
605064	2016 BL	—	December 5, 2015	Haleakala	Pan-STARRS 1	H	470 m	MPC · JPL
605065	2016 BV_{2}	—	December 28, 2000	Kitt Peak	Spacewatch	·	1.3 km	MPC · JPL
605066	2016 BY_{19}	—	January 20, 2009	Kitt Peak	Spacewatch	·	560 m	MPC · JPL
605067	2016 BH_{21}	—	December 3, 2005	Mauna Kea	A. Boattini	·	610 m	MPC · JPL
605068	2016 BF_{32}	—	January 8, 2016	Haleakala	Pan-STARRS 1	·	3.4 km	MPC · JPL
605069	2016 BH_{37}	—	October 1, 2014	Haleakala	Pan-STARRS 1	·	1.1 km	MPC · JPL
605070	2016 BT_{39}	—	January 30, 2016	Haleakala	Pan-STARRS 1	APO · PHA	410 m	MPC · JPL
605071	2016 BB_{41}	—	August 10, 2010	Kitt Peak	Spacewatch	·	690 m	MPC · JPL
605072	2016 BK_{44}	—	February 14, 2005	Kitt Peak	Spacewatch	·	3.4 km	MPC · JPL
605073	2016 BY_{51}	—	January 30, 2016	Mount Lemmon	Mount Lemmon Survey	·	670 m	MPC · JPL
605074	2016 BR_{52}	—	January 15, 2016	Haleakala	Pan-STARRS 1	3:2	4.4 km	MPC · JPL
605075	2016 BZ_{56}	—	November 1, 2005	Mount Lemmon	Mount Lemmon Survey	·	620 m	MPC · JPL
605076	2016 BW_{60}	—	July 25, 2014	Haleakala	Pan-STARRS 1	·	1.1 km	MPC · JPL
605077	2016 BT_{71}	—	January 2, 2016	Mount Lemmon	Mount Lemmon Survey	·	760 m	MPC · JPL
605078	2016 BV_{72}	—	April 1, 2003	Apache Point	SDSS Collaboration	·	480 m	MPC · JPL
605079	2016 BQ_{86}	—	March 25, 2012	Mount Lemmon	Mount Lemmon Survey	·	1.4 km	MPC · JPL
605080	2016 BE_{90}	—	January 17, 2016	Haleakala	Pan-STARRS 1	·	600 m	MPC · JPL
605081	2016 BA_{93}	—	January 18, 2016	Haleakala	Pan-STARRS 1	MAS	560 m	MPC · JPL
605082	2016 BA_{99}	—	April 28, 2012	Mount Lemmon	Mount Lemmon Survey	·	1.5 km	MPC · JPL
605083	2016 CF_{4}	—	December 30, 2008	Mount Lemmon	Mount Lemmon Survey	·	500 m	MPC · JPL
605084	2016 CX_{7}	—	October 16, 2007	Mount Lemmon	Mount Lemmon Survey	·	3.0 km	MPC · JPL
605085	2016 CZ_{11}	—	December 9, 2015	Haleakala	Pan-STARRS 1	·	1.0 km	MPC · JPL
605086	2016 CG_{21}	—	January 29, 2016	Kitt Peak	Spacewatch	·	540 m	MPC · JPL
605087	2016 CV_{29}	—	January 29, 2011	Kitt Peak	Spacewatch	H	500 m	MPC · JPL
605088	2016 CT_{36}	—	January 20, 2009	Kitt Peak	Spacewatch	·	540 m	MPC · JPL
605089	2016 CF_{40}	—	February 19, 2009	Kitt Peak	Spacewatch	NYS	920 m	MPC · JPL
605090	2016 CV_{41}	—	March 19, 2009	Mount Lemmon	Mount Lemmon Survey	·	900 m	MPC · JPL
605091	2016 CS_{47}	—	November 21, 2014	Haleakala	Pan-STARRS 1	VER	2.2 km	MPC · JPL
605092	2016 CV_{47}	—	January 9, 2002	Kitt Peak	Spacewatch	·	580 m	MPC · JPL
605093	2016 CE_{50}	—	October 24, 2011	Haleakala	Pan-STARRS 1	·	540 m	MPC · JPL
605094	2016 CM_{52}	—	May 3, 2009	La Sagra	OAM	·	1.0 km	MPC · JPL
605095	2016 CA_{57}	—	August 28, 2014	Haleakala	Pan-STARRS 1	·	640 m	MPC · JPL
605096	2016 CB_{62}	—	October 19, 2007	Catalina	CSS	·	1 km	MPC · JPL
605097	2016 CN_{62}	—	February 3, 2016	Haleakala	Pan-STARRS 1	PHO	630 m	MPC · JPL
605098	2016 CS_{63}	—	March 30, 2012	Catalina	CSS	·	1.5 km	MPC · JPL
605099	2016 CU_{68}	—	December 22, 2008	Mount Lemmon	Mount Lemmon Survey	·	810 m	MPC · JPL
605100	2016 CO_{73}	—	February 4, 2016	Haleakala	Pan-STARRS 1	·	960 m	MPC · JPL

== 605101–605200 ==
back to top

Designation			Discovery			Properties		Ref
Permanent	Provisional	Named after	Date	Site	Discoverer(s)	Category	Diam.	Ref
605101	2016 CS_{78}	—	December 16, 2007	Kitt Peak	Spacewatch	SUL	1.8 km	MPC · JPL
605102	2016 CX_{86}	—	August 20, 2014	Haleakala	Pan-STARRS 1	·	910 m	MPC · JPL
605103	2016 CU_{88}	—	October 12, 2007	Kitt Peak	Spacewatch	·	730 m	MPC · JPL
605104	2016 CU_{101}	—	February 5, 2016	Haleakala	Pan-STARRS 1	·	750 m	MPC · JPL
605105	2016 CT_{107}	—	April 12, 2013	Haleakala	Pan-STARRS 1	·	600 m	MPC · JPL
605106	2016 CU_{107}	—	October 9, 2008	Kitt Peak	Spacewatch	·	1.9 km	MPC · JPL
605107	2016 CZ_{112}	—	July 12, 2013	Haleakala	Pan-STARRS 1	·	1.6 km	MPC · JPL
605108	2016 CB_{117}	—	October 20, 2011	Kitt Peak	Spacewatch	·	660 m	MPC · JPL
605109	2016 CZ_{120}	—	September 23, 2008	Kitt Peak	Spacewatch	·	510 m	MPC · JPL
605110	2016 CK_{131}	—	November 27, 2011	Kitt Peak	Spacewatch	·	650 m	MPC · JPL
605111	2016 CN_{131}	—	February 5, 2016	Haleakala	Pan-STARRS 1	MAS	670 m	MPC · JPL
605112	2016 CB_{141}	—	April 19, 2009	Mount Lemmon	Mount Lemmon Survey	·	880 m	MPC · JPL
605113	2016 CM_{144}	—	April 4, 2013	Siding Spring	SSS	·	630 m	MPC · JPL
605114	2016 CW_{146}	—	September 26, 2011	Haleakala	Pan-STARRS 1	·	480 m	MPC · JPL
605115	2016 CA_{148}	—	March 2, 2006	Kitt Peak	Spacewatch	·	490 m	MPC · JPL
605116	2016 CJ_{149}	—	February 4, 2006	Kitt Peak	Spacewatch	KOR	1.5 km	MPC · JPL
605117	2016 CS_{149}	—	February 23, 2012	Mount Lemmon	Mount Lemmon Survey	·	1.0 km	MPC · JPL
605118	2016 CE_{152}	—	September 24, 2009	Mount Lemmon	Mount Lemmon Survey	·	2.6 km	MPC · JPL
605119	2016 CB_{166}	—	January 3, 2016	Haleakala	Pan-STARRS 1	3:2	4.4 km	MPC · JPL
605120	2016 CF_{166}	—	January 6, 2006	Mount Lemmon	Mount Lemmon Survey	·	710 m	MPC · JPL
605121	2016 CU_{188}	—	February 9, 2016	Haleakala	Pan-STARRS 1	MAS	520 m	MPC · JPL
605122	2016 CT_{193}	—	October 11, 2012	Haleakala	Pan-STARRS 1	H	370 m	MPC · JPL
605123	2016 CZ_{199}	—	May 15, 2013	Haleakala	Pan-STARRS 1	·	660 m	MPC · JPL
605124	2016 CS_{200}	—	February 4, 2006	Kitt Peak	Spacewatch	·	650 m	MPC · JPL
605125	2016 CU_{200}	—	April 27, 2012	Haleakala	Pan-STARRS 1	AGN	920 m	MPC · JPL
605126	2016 CJ_{201}	—	February 28, 2009	Kitt Peak	Spacewatch	NYS	910 m	MPC · JPL
605127	2016 CD_{207}	—	February 20, 2009	Kitt Peak	Spacewatch	·	770 m	MPC · JPL
605128	2016 CF_{212}	—	January 17, 2016	Haleakala	Pan-STARRS 1	·	850 m	MPC · JPL
605129	2016 CO_{221}	—	November 17, 2011	Kitt Peak	Spacewatch	·	650 m	MPC · JPL
605130	2016 CL_{234}	—	March 11, 2008	Catalina	CSS	·	1.7 km	MPC · JPL
605131	2016 CZ_{246}	—	February 12, 2016	Haleakala	Pan-STARRS 1	H	450 m	MPC · JPL
605132	2016 CH_{249}	—	September 15, 2007	Mount Lemmon	Mount Lemmon Survey	MAS	540 m	MPC · JPL
605133	2016 CP_{254}	—	August 10, 2005	Siding Spring	SSS	·	2.1 km	MPC · JPL
605134	2016 CG_{259}	—	April 17, 2009	Mount Lemmon	Mount Lemmon Survey	·	690 m	MPC · JPL
605135	2016 CP_{259}	—	May 20, 2005	Mount Lemmon	Mount Lemmon Survey	·	1.4 km	MPC · JPL
605136	2016 CH_{260}	—	July 15, 2013	Haleakala	Pan-STARRS 1	·	900 m	MPC · JPL
605137	2016 CX_{262}	—	April 20, 2012	Siding Spring	SSS	·	2.0 km	MPC · JPL
605138	2016 CL_{272}	—	March 11, 2005	Mount Lemmon	Mount Lemmon Survey	MAS	530 m	MPC · JPL
605139	2016 CJ_{280}	—	May 8, 2013	Haleakala	Pan-STARRS 1	·	740 m	MPC · JPL
605140	2016 CL_{283}	—	February 22, 2009	Kitt Peak	Spacewatch	·	580 m	MPC · JPL
605141	2016 CB_{284}	—	December 5, 2007	Mount Lemmon	Mount Lemmon Survey	·	910 m	MPC · JPL
605142	2016 CW_{285}	—	February 10, 2016	Haleakala	Pan-STARRS 1	·	870 m	MPC · JPL
605143	2016 CY_{288}	—	June 18, 2013	Mount Lemmon	Mount Lemmon Survey	·	2.7 km	MPC · JPL
605144	2016 CU_{290}	—	February 11, 2016	Haleakala	Pan-STARRS 1	V	570 m	MPC · JPL
605145	2016 CW_{292}	—	August 10, 2010	Kitt Peak	Spacewatch	·	830 m	MPC · JPL
605146	2016 CH_{293}	—	August 25, 2003	Cerro Tololo	Deep Ecliptic Survey	·	760 m	MPC · JPL
605147	2016 CF_{294}	—	March 19, 2009	Mount Lemmon	Mount Lemmon Survey	PHO	720 m	MPC · JPL
605148	2016 CL_{295}	—	February 5, 2016	Haleakala	Pan-STARRS 1	V	570 m	MPC · JPL
605149	2016 CE_{304}	—	February 24, 2012	Mount Lemmon	Mount Lemmon Survey	·	1.1 km	MPC · JPL
605150	2016 CY_{308}	—	February 9, 2016	Haleakala	Pan-STARRS 1	V	520 m	MPC · JPL
605151	2016 CT_{323}	—	February 14, 2016	Haleakala	Pan-STARRS 1	·	300 m	MPC · JPL
605152	2016 CK_{325}	—	February 11, 2016	Haleakala	Pan-STARRS 1	MAS	490 m	MPC · JPL
605153	2016 CJ_{326}	—	February 3, 2016	Haleakala	Pan-STARRS 1	PHO	720 m	MPC · JPL
605154	2016 CT_{330}	—	February 9, 2016	Haleakala	Pan-STARRS 1	·	1.2 km	MPC · JPL
605155	2016 CP_{331}	—	October 11, 2002	Apache Point	SDSS Collaboration	·	2.1 km	MPC · JPL
605156	2016 CC_{332}	—	February 5, 2016	Haleakala	Pan-STARRS 1	·	820 m	MPC · JPL
605157	2016 CN_{336}	—	February 5, 2016	Haleakala	Pan-STARRS 1	·	700 m	MPC · JPL
605158	2016 CY_{339}	—	March 22, 2009	Mount Lemmon	Mount Lemmon Survey	·	800 m	MPC · JPL
605159	2016 CG_{345}	—	February 4, 2016	Haleakala	Pan-STARRS 1	·	680 m	MPC · JPL
605160	2016 CJ_{345}	—	February 5, 2016	Haleakala	Pan-STARRS 1	·	910 m	MPC · JPL
605161	2016 CN_{356}	—	February 9, 2016	Haleakala	Pan-STARRS 1	·	1.7 km	MPC · JPL
605162	2016 CR_{356}	—	February 11, 2016	Haleakala	Pan-STARRS 1	·	1.3 km	MPC · JPL
605163	2016 CQ_{358}	—	November 20, 2014	Mount Lemmon	Mount Lemmon Survey	·	1.8 km	MPC · JPL
605164	2016 CN_{379}	—	April 12, 2012	Haleakala	Pan-STARRS 1	·	1.6 km	MPC · JPL
605165	2016 CF_{382}	—	February 5, 2016	Haleakala	Pan-STARRS 1	·	1.8 km	MPC · JPL
605166	2016 DX_{8}	—	February 3, 2009	Kitt Peak	Spacewatch	·	580 m	MPC · JPL
605167	2016 DG_{11}	—	November 1, 2008	Mount Lemmon	Mount Lemmon Survey	·	610 m	MPC · JPL
605168	2016 DO_{15}	—	September 17, 2010	Mount Lemmon	Mount Lemmon Survey	·	970 m	MPC · JPL
605169	2016 DR_{15}	—	September 16, 2003	Kitt Peak	Spacewatch	·	1.5 km	MPC · JPL
605170	2016 DA_{18}	—	August 16, 2009	Kitt Peak	Spacewatch	·	1.4 km	MPC · JPL
605171	2016 DL_{19}	—	January 27, 2012	Mount Lemmon	Mount Lemmon Survey	·	970 m	MPC · JPL
605172	2016 DO_{19}	—	February 5, 2016	Haleakala	Pan-STARRS 1	·	720 m	MPC · JPL
605173	2016 DO_{20}	—	August 15, 2013	Haleakala	Pan-STARRS 1	·	1.2 km	MPC · JPL
605174	2016 DX_{23}	—	February 27, 2016	Mount Lemmon	Mount Lemmon Survey	MAS	540 m	MPC · JPL
605175	2016 DT_{24}	—	March 28, 2008	Mount Lemmon	Mount Lemmon Survey	·	820 m	MPC · JPL
605176	2016 DJ_{25}	—	February 24, 2009	Kitt Peak	Spacewatch	·	780 m	MPC · JPL
605177	2016 DL_{26}	—	October 10, 2007	Mount Lemmon	Mount Lemmon Survey	·	840 m	MPC · JPL
605178	2016 DH_{28}	—	February 20, 2009	Kitt Peak	Spacewatch	·	720 m	MPC · JPL
605179	2016 DK_{29}	—	September 14, 2007	Kitt Peak	Spacewatch	(2076)	710 m	MPC · JPL
605180	2016 DC_{31}	—	September 27, 2003	Apache Point	SDSS	H	580 m	MPC · JPL
605181	2016 DM_{35}	—	February 8, 2016	Mount Lemmon	Mount Lemmon Survey	MAS	480 m	MPC · JPL
605182	2016 DE_{38}	—	February 19, 2016	Haleakala	Pan-STARRS 1	·	800 m	MPC · JPL
605183	2016 EE_{7}	—	May 3, 2006	Mount Lemmon	Mount Lemmon Survey	V	430 m	MPC · JPL
605184	2016 ET_{8}	—	March 31, 2008	Mount Lemmon	Mount Lemmon Survey	·	1.3 km	MPC · JPL
605185	2016 EV_{8}	—	October 9, 2004	Kitt Peak	Spacewatch	·	930 m	MPC · JPL
605186	2016 EN_{10}	—	June 11, 2007	Mauna Kea	D. D. Balam, K. M. Perrett	·	2.5 km	MPC · JPL
605187	2016 EE_{17}	—	March 3, 2016	Haleakala	Pan-STARRS 1	·	3.1 km	MPC · JPL
605188	2016 EG_{27}	—	September 24, 2006	Kitt Peak	Spacewatch	H	400 m	MPC · JPL
605189	2016 EA_{29}	—	April 2, 2006	Kitt Peak	Spacewatch	·	480 m	MPC · JPL
605190	2016 EG_{30}	—	April 21, 2012	Haleakala	Pan-STARRS 1	·	1.5 km	MPC · JPL
605191	2016 EY_{41}	—	November 19, 2008	Mount Lemmon	Mount Lemmon Survey	·	530 m	MPC · JPL
605192	2016 EE_{44}	—	December 10, 2012	Haleakala	Pan-STARRS 1	H	430 m	MPC · JPL
605193	2016 EP_{45}	—	June 16, 2010	Mount Lemmon	Mount Lemmon Survey	·	650 m	MPC · JPL
605194	2016 EQ_{59}	—	October 13, 2007	Kitt Peak	Spacewatch	·	720 m	MPC · JPL
605195	2016 EY_{65}	—	January 19, 2012	Haleakala	Pan-STARRS 1	·	940 m	MPC · JPL
605196	2016 EX_{71}	—	February 4, 2002	Anderson Mesa	LONEOS	H	570 m	MPC · JPL
605197	2016 EF_{78}	—	October 23, 2014	Mount Lemmon	Mount Lemmon Survey	·	1.4 km	MPC · JPL
605198	2016 EM_{96}	—	April 15, 2013	Haleakala	Pan-STARRS 1	·	650 m	MPC · JPL
605199	2016 EE_{97}	—	September 18, 2014	Haleakala	Pan-STARRS 1	·	1.1 km	MPC · JPL
605200	2016 EG_{111}	—	January 27, 2012	Mount Lemmon	Mount Lemmon Survey	·	730 m	MPC · JPL

== 605201–605300 ==
back to top

Designation			Discovery			Properties		Ref
Permanent	Provisional	Named after	Date	Site	Discoverer(s)	Category	Diam.	Ref
605201	2016 EW_{112}	—	August 4, 2013	Haleakala	Pan-STARRS 1	NYS	810 m	MPC · JPL
605202	2016 EF_{119}	—	March 1, 2016	Mount Lemmon	Mount Lemmon Survey	NYS	710 m	MPC · JPL
605203	2016 EO_{121}	—	March 9, 2005	Kitt Peak	Spacewatch	·	1.9 km	MPC · JPL
605204	2016 EU_{122}	—	November 22, 2014	Mount Lemmon	Mount Lemmon Survey	·	880 m	MPC · JPL
605205	2016 EU_{125}	—	October 30, 2014	Haleakala	Pan-STARRS 1	HNS	810 m	MPC · JPL
605206	2016 ED_{127}	—	February 13, 2008	Mount Lemmon	Mount Lemmon Survey	3:2 · SHU	4.4 km	MPC · JPL
605207	2016 EL_{127}	—	January 8, 2016	Haleakala	Pan-STARRS 1	·	1.5 km	MPC · JPL
605208	2016 EC_{128}	—	January 27, 2012	Mount Lemmon	Mount Lemmon Survey	MAS	550 m	MPC · JPL
605209	2016 EZ_{129}	—	August 31, 2005	Kitt Peak	Spacewatch	·	1.4 km	MPC · JPL
605210	2016 EA_{131}	—	July 14, 2013	Haleakala	Pan-STARRS 1	·	1.2 km	MPC · JPL
605211	2016 EZ_{131}	—	March 13, 2005	Kitt Peak	Spacewatch	·	2.2 km	MPC · JPL
605212	2016 EJ_{132}	—	August 28, 1995	Kitt Peak	Spacewatch	·	990 m	MPC · JPL
605213	2016 EQ_{135}	—	March 5, 2002	Apache Point	SDSS Collaboration	(2076)	640 m	MPC · JPL
605214	2016 EN_{137}	—	March 10, 2005	Mount Lemmon	Mount Lemmon Survey	·	860 m	MPC · JPL
605215	2016 EN_{138}	—	January 26, 2012	Mount Lemmon	Mount Lemmon Survey	MAS	730 m	MPC · JPL
605216	2016 EN_{139}	—	March 1, 2016	Haleakala	Pan-STARRS 1	·	680 m	MPC · JPL
605217	2016 EU_{140}	—	March 9, 2005	Mount Lemmon	Mount Lemmon Survey	·	680 m	MPC · JPL
605218	2016 EW_{142}	—	April 6, 2002	Cerro Tololo	Deep Ecliptic Survey	·	640 m	MPC · JPL
605219	2016 EM_{143}	—	November 5, 1999	Kitt Peak	Spacewatch	·	1.1 km	MPC · JPL
605220	2016 EO_{143}	—	March 19, 2009	Kitt Peak	Spacewatch	·	880 m	MPC · JPL
605221	2016 EL_{144}	—	February 27, 2009	Kitt Peak	Spacewatch	·	530 m	MPC · JPL
605222	2016 EN_{144}	—	February 4, 2005	Kitt Peak	Spacewatch	·	680 m	MPC · JPL
605223	2016 EN_{145}	—	March 29, 2009	Kitt Peak	Spacewatch	·	860 m	MPC · JPL
605224	2016 EN_{146}	—	March 10, 2016	Haleakala	Pan-STARRS 1	·	1.8 km	MPC · JPL
605225	2016 EC_{147}	—	March 24, 2009	Mount Lemmon	Mount Lemmon Survey	·	640 m	MPC · JPL
605226	2016 EO_{150}	—	February 16, 2012	Haleakala	Pan-STARRS 1	·	930 m	MPC · JPL
605227	2016 ET_{150}	—	December 2, 2008	Kitt Peak	Spacewatch	·	500 m	MPC · JPL
605228	2016 EW_{150}	—	October 1, 2010	Mount Lemmon	Mount Lemmon Survey	·	550 m	MPC · JPL
605229	2016 EB_{151}	—	February 29, 2008	Kitt Peak	Spacewatch	·	880 m	MPC · JPL
605230	2016 EG_{151}	—	November 20, 2007	Kitt Peak	Spacewatch	·	800 m	MPC · JPL
605231	2016 EO_{151}	—	May 20, 2005	Mount Lemmon	Mount Lemmon Survey	NYS	1.1 km	MPC · JPL
605232	2016 EW_{159}	—	October 30, 2008	Kitt Peak	Spacewatch	·	2.2 km	MPC · JPL
605233	2016 EG_{161}	—	February 26, 2009	Calar Alto	F. Hormuth	·	720 m	MPC · JPL
605234	2016 ER_{165}	—	March 9, 2005	Mount Lemmon	Mount Lemmon Survey	·	700 m	MPC · JPL
605235	2016 EZ_{165}	—	April 22, 2009	Mount Lemmon	Mount Lemmon Survey	·	730 m	MPC · JPL
605236	2016 EK_{167}	—	February 13, 2012	Haleakala	Pan-STARRS 1	·	1.1 km	MPC · JPL
605237	2016 EV_{178}	—	April 27, 2009	Mount Lemmon	Mount Lemmon Survey	·	820 m	MPC · JPL
605238	2016 EG_{194}	—	September 14, 2007	Mount Lemmon	Mount Lemmon Survey	·	610 m	MPC · JPL
605239	2016 EV_{194}	—	May 22, 2006	Siding Spring	SSS	·	610 m	MPC · JPL
605240	2016 EY_{196}	—	March 14, 2016	Mount Lemmon	Mount Lemmon Survey	PHO	530 m	MPC · JPL
605241	2016 EK_{197}	—	November 12, 2001	Apache Point	SDSS Collaboration	·	690 m	MPC · JPL
605242	2016 EA_{200}	—	October 11, 2010	Mayhill-ISON	L. Elenin	·	950 m	MPC · JPL
605243	2016 EL_{216}	—	September 17, 2010	Mount Lemmon	Mount Lemmon Survey	·	830 m	MPC · JPL
605244	2016 EU_{216}	—	January 16, 2005	Kitt Peak	Spacewatch	·	690 m	MPC · JPL
605245	2016 ET_{220}	—	December 15, 2007	Mount Lemmon	Mount Lemmon Survey	·	1 km	MPC · JPL
605246	2016 ED_{222}	—	March 13, 2012	Mount Lemmon	Mount Lemmon Survey	·	800 m	MPC · JPL
605247	2016 EJ_{223}	—	March 16, 2012	Mount Lemmon	Mount Lemmon Survey	·	850 m	MPC · JPL
605248	2016 ES_{230}	—	November 17, 2014	Mount Lemmon	Mount Lemmon Survey	·	810 m	MPC · JPL
605249	2016 EY_{232}	—	May 1, 2012	Mount Lemmon	Mount Lemmon Survey	MAR	790 m	MPC · JPL
605250	2016 ED_{233}	—	March 1, 2012	Mount Lemmon	Mount Lemmon Survey	·	900 m	MPC · JPL
605251	2016 EW_{249}	—	March 3, 2016	Mount Lemmon	Mount Lemmon Survey	V	490 m	MPC · JPL
605252	2016 EA_{250}	—	March 10, 2016	Haleakala	Pan-STARRS 1	MAS	650 m	MPC · JPL
605253	2016 EL_{266}	—	March 7, 2016	Haleakala	Pan-STARRS 1	·	800 m	MPC · JPL
605254	2016 EA_{273}	—	March 7, 2016	Haleakala	Pan-STARRS 1	V	440 m	MPC · JPL
605255	2016 EJ_{301}	—	March 13, 2016	Haleakala	Pan-STARRS 1	·	920 m	MPC · JPL
605256	2016 EV_{309}	—	March 2, 2016	Haleakala	Pan-STARRS 1	·	2.6 km	MPC · JPL
605257	2016 FV_{11}	—	November 18, 2007	Mount Lemmon	Mount Lemmon Survey	·	1.1 km	MPC · JPL
605258	2016 FB_{19}	—	March 17, 2009	Kitt Peak	Spacewatch	V	520 m	MPC · JPL
605259	2016 FK_{22}	—	June 20, 2013	Haleakala	Pan-STARRS 1	·	490 m	MPC · JPL
605260	2016 FL_{23}	—	November 20, 2014	Haleakala	Pan-STARRS 1	·	680 m	MPC · JPL
605261	2016 FH_{24}	—	December 26, 2006	Mauna Kea	D. D. Balam, K. M. Perrett	·	1.1 km	MPC · JPL
605262	2016 FU_{24}	—	December 8, 2005	Kitt Peak	Spacewatch	·	1.6 km	MPC · JPL
605263	2016 FZ_{24}	—	April 15, 2001	Kitt Peak	Spacewatch	NYS	890 m	MPC · JPL
605264	2016 FF_{27}	—	August 21, 2006	Kitt Peak	Spacewatch	THM	2.0 km	MPC · JPL
605265	2016 FD_{28}	—	February 2, 2008	Mount Lemmon	Mount Lemmon Survey	MAS	510 m	MPC · JPL
605266	2016 FO_{35}	—	January 12, 2002	Kitt Peak	Spacewatch	·	470 m	MPC · JPL
605267	2016 FM_{36}	—	January 15, 2016	Haleakala	Pan-STARRS 1	·	1.5 km	MPC · JPL
605268	2016 FC_{41}	—	August 28, 2001	Kitt Peak	Spacewatch	KON	2.6 km	MPC · JPL
605269	2016 FO_{41}	—	March 10, 2016	Haleakala	Pan-STARRS 1	·	800 m	MPC · JPL
605270	2016 FC_{42}	—	March 12, 2003	Kitt Peak	Spacewatch	·	1.1 km	MPC · JPL
605271	2016 FQ_{45}	—	December 29, 2008	Mount Lemmon	Mount Lemmon Survey	·	600 m	MPC · JPL
605272	2016 FV_{45}	—	February 5, 2016	Haleakala	Pan-STARRS 1	·	760 m	MPC · JPL
605273	2016 FW_{45}	—	February 13, 2008	Kitt Peak	Spacewatch	·	930 m	MPC · JPL
605274	2016 FZ_{49}	—	December 3, 2005	Mauna Kea	A. Boattini	·	560 m	MPC · JPL
605275	2016 FU_{51}	—	January 30, 2008	Kitt Peak	Spacewatch	NYS	1.1 km	MPC · JPL
605276	2016 FH_{53}	—	November 26, 2014	Haleakala	Pan-STARRS 1	·	1.4 km	MPC · JPL
605277	2016 FT_{55}	—	February 16, 2012	Haleakala	Pan-STARRS 1	V	730 m	MPC · JPL
605278	2016 FC_{56}	—	March 11, 2008	Kitt Peak	Spacewatch	·	780 m	MPC · JPL
605279	2016 FF_{56}	—	October 1, 2013	Kitt Peak	Spacewatch	·	2.8 km	MPC · JPL
605280	2016 FG_{56}	—	March 1, 2009	Kitt Peak	Spacewatch	·	740 m	MPC · JPL
605281	2016 FR_{63}	—	April 26, 2006	Cerro Tololo	Deep Ecliptic Survey	·	2.0 km	MPC · JPL
605282	2016 FS_{65}	—	April 23, 2009	Kitt Peak	Spacewatch	PHO	640 m	MPC · JPL
605283	2016 FE_{67}	—	July 14, 2013	Haleakala	Pan-STARRS 1	·	1.0 km	MPC · JPL
605284	2016 FU_{67}	—	March 31, 2016	Haleakala	Pan-STARRS 1	·	1.2 km	MPC · JPL
605285	2016 FJ_{68}	—	March 18, 2016	Mount Lemmon	Mount Lemmon Survey	·	590 m	MPC · JPL
605286	2016 FL_{73}	—	March 30, 2016	Haleakala	Pan-STARRS 1	·	510 m	MPC · JPL
605287	2016 GX_{3}	—	August 16, 2013	Haleakala	Pan-STARRS 1	·	3.1 km	MPC · JPL
605288	2016 GA_{9}	—	February 19, 2009	Kitt Peak	Spacewatch	(2076)	540 m	MPC · JPL
605289	2016 GE_{9}	—	September 13, 2007	Mount Lemmon	Mount Lemmon Survey	·	500 m	MPC · JPL
605290	2016 GG_{10}	—	April 1, 2008	Kitt Peak	Spacewatch	·	760 m	MPC · JPL
605291	2016 GZ_{12}	—	September 13, 2007	Mount Lemmon	Mount Lemmon Survey	·	660 m	MPC · JPL
605292	2016 GM_{13}	—	November 27, 2014	Haleakala	Pan-STARRS 1	·	580 m	MPC · JPL
605293	2016 GV_{17}	—	March 10, 2016	Haleakala	Pan-STARRS 1	·	1.8 km	MPC · JPL
605294	2016 GB_{21}	—	August 14, 2006	Siding Spring	SSS	·	980 m	MPC · JPL
605295	2016 GM_{23}	—	January 8, 2016	Haleakala	Pan-STARRS 1	·	2.5 km	MPC · JPL
605296	2016 GK_{24}	—	June 21, 2009	Mount Lemmon	Mount Lemmon Survey	·	1.3 km	MPC · JPL
605297	2016 GA_{27}	—	January 8, 2016	Haleakala	Pan-STARRS 1	·	1.1 km	MPC · JPL
605298	2016 GA_{29}	—	February 20, 2009	Kitt Peak	Spacewatch	·	710 m	MPC · JPL
605299	2016 GT_{30}	—	March 22, 2009	Mount Lemmon	Mount Lemmon Survey	·	590 m	MPC · JPL
605300	2016 GG_{31}	—	October 26, 2011	Haleakala	Pan-STARRS 1	·	440 m	MPC · JPL

== 605301–605400 ==
back to top

Designation			Discovery			Properties		Ref
Permanent	Provisional	Named after	Date	Site	Discoverer(s)	Category	Diam.	Ref
605301	2016 GQ_{33}	—	March 20, 2002	Kitt Peak	Spacewatch	·	570 m	MPC · JPL
605302	2016 GV_{33}	—	September 29, 2010	Mount Lemmon	Mount Lemmon Survey	·	830 m	MPC · JPL
605303	2016 GL_{35}	—	September 15, 2010	Kitt Peak	Spacewatch	·	620 m	MPC · JPL
605304	2016 GE_{36}	—	March 4, 2016	Haleakala	Pan-STARRS 1	·	860 m	MPC · JPL
605305	2016 GM_{45}	—	February 21, 2009	Cordell-Lorenz	D. T. Durig	·	590 m	MPC · JPL
605306	2016 GE_{47}	—	March 20, 2007	Mount Lemmon	Mount Lemmon Survey	(17392)	1.1 km	MPC · JPL
605307	2016 GT_{54}	—	February 26, 2008	Mount Lemmon	Mount Lemmon Survey	MAS	700 m	MPC · JPL
605308	2016 GQ_{55}	—	November 21, 2014	Haleakala	Pan-STARRS 1	·	980 m	MPC · JPL
605309	2016 GP_{62}	—	August 14, 2013	Haleakala	Pan-STARRS 1	NYS	880 m	MPC · JPL
605310	2016 GF_{68}	—	March 9, 2007	Catalina	CSS	EUN	1.4 km	MPC · JPL
605311	2016 GW_{70}	—	September 14, 2006	Kitt Peak	Spacewatch	·	2.8 km	MPC · JPL
605312	2016 GO_{73}	—	November 16, 2009	Mount Lemmon	Mount Lemmon Survey	·	1.2 km	MPC · JPL
605313	2016 GW_{73}	—	June 20, 2013	Mount Lemmon	Mount Lemmon Survey	·	900 m	MPC · JPL
605314	2016 GM_{77}	—	September 24, 2013	Mount Lemmon	Mount Lemmon Survey	·	910 m	MPC · JPL
605315	2016 GG_{78}	—	November 1, 2006	Kitt Peak	Spacewatch	·	900 m	MPC · JPL
605316	2016 GM_{82}	—	March 16, 2012	Mount Lemmon	Mount Lemmon Survey	·	960 m	MPC · JPL
605317	2016 GK_{86}	—	September 4, 2007	Mount Lemmon	Mount Lemmon Survey	·	600 m	MPC · JPL
605318	2016 GS_{89}	—	June 20, 2013	Haleakala	Pan-STARRS 1	·	960 m	MPC · JPL
605319	2016 GU_{91}	—	October 28, 2014	Haleakala	Pan-STARRS 1	·	520 m	MPC · JPL
605320	2016 GE_{92}	—	October 17, 2007	Mount Lemmon	Mount Lemmon Survey	(1298)	2.8 km	MPC · JPL
605321	2016 GU_{94}	—	June 21, 2010	Mount Lemmon	Mount Lemmon Survey	·	550 m	MPC · JPL
605322	2016 GU_{95}	—	January 11, 2010	Mount Lemmon	Mount Lemmon Survey	·	1.7 km	MPC · JPL
605323	2016 GA_{100}	—	January 30, 2011	Haleakala	Pan-STARRS 1	·	1.4 km	MPC · JPL
605324	2016 GH_{100}	—	September 1, 2013	Haleakala	Pan-STARRS 1	·	820 m	MPC · JPL
605325	2016 GD_{102}	—	April 1, 2016	Haleakala	Pan-STARRS 1	MAS	630 m	MPC · JPL
605326	2016 GF_{102}	—	March 10, 2016	Haleakala	Pan-STARRS 1	·	880 m	MPC · JPL
605327	2016 GD_{103}	—	September 6, 2013	Catalina	CSS	·	980 m	MPC · JPL
605328	2016 GR_{104}	—	August 18, 2006	Kitt Peak	Spacewatch	THM	2.2 km	MPC · JPL
605329	2016 GE_{105}	—	February 27, 2012	Kitt Peak	Spacewatch	MAS	620 m	MPC · JPL
605330	2016 GM_{108}	—	August 14, 2013	Haleakala	Pan-STARRS 1	·	890 m	MPC · JPL
605331	2016 GW_{108}	—	June 9, 2012	Mount Lemmon	Mount Lemmon Survey	·	1.5 km	MPC · JPL
605332	2016 GN_{113}	—	January 11, 2008	Kitt Peak	Spacewatch	NYS	920 m	MPC · JPL
605333	2016 GP_{116}	—	September 18, 2012	Mount Lemmon	Mount Lemmon Survey	THM	2.1 km	MPC · JPL
605334	2016 GB_{126}	—	April 4, 2002	Palomar	NEAT	·	990 m	MPC · JPL
605335	2016 GX_{126}	—	February 12, 2011	Mount Lemmon	Mount Lemmon Survey	·	1.8 km	MPC · JPL
605336	2016 GQ_{130}	—	December 25, 2010	Mount Lemmon	Mount Lemmon Survey	·	1.2 km	MPC · JPL
605337	2016 GZ_{131}	—	May 21, 2012	Haleakala	Pan-STARRS 1	·	1.4 km	MPC · JPL
605338	2016 GT_{134}	—	July 10, 2007	Siding Spring	SSS	·	690 m	MPC · JPL
605339	2016 GU_{135}	—	June 18, 2013	Haleakala	Pan-STARRS 1	·	590 m	MPC · JPL
605340	2016 GO_{138}	—	November 4, 2014	Mount Lemmon	Mount Lemmon Survey	·	1.1 km	MPC · JPL
605341	2016 GM_{139}	—	June 6, 2011	Haleakala	Pan-STARRS 1	HYG	2.2 km	MPC · JPL
605342	2016 GO_{139}	—	October 25, 2014	Haleakala	Pan-STARRS 1	·	830 m	MPC · JPL
605343	2016 GW_{140}	—	March 20, 2012	Haleakala	Pan-STARRS 1	·	870 m	MPC · JPL
605344	2016 GW_{142}	—	January 16, 2005	Kitt Peak	Spacewatch	·	770 m	MPC · JPL
605345	2016 GN_{143}	—	February 19, 2012	Kitt Peak	Spacewatch	·	1.0 km	MPC · JPL
605346	2016 GE_{144}	—	April 18, 2009	Mount Lemmon	Mount Lemmon Survey	·	1.0 km	MPC · JPL
605347	2016 GM_{146}	—	March 12, 2016	Haleakala	Pan-STARRS 1	·	830 m	MPC · JPL
605348	2016 GE_{147}	—	April 2, 2005	Kitt Peak	Spacewatch	·	950 m	MPC · JPL
605349	2016 GY_{148}	—	March 2, 2009	Mount Lemmon	Mount Lemmon Survey	·	570 m	MPC · JPL
605350	2016 GF_{154}	—	May 14, 2009	Kitt Peak	Spacewatch	·	1.0 km	MPC · JPL
605351	2016 GK_{157}	—	January 18, 2012	Mount Lemmon	Mount Lemmon Survey	·	830 m	MPC · JPL
605352	2016 GW_{160}	—	January 1, 2012	Mount Lemmon	Mount Lemmon Survey	·	840 m	MPC · JPL
605353	2016 GR_{162}	—	May 14, 2005	Mount Lemmon	Mount Lemmon Survey	·	1.1 km	MPC · JPL
605354	2016 GD_{163}	—	December 6, 2011	Haleakala	Pan-STARRS 1	·	520 m	MPC · JPL
605355	2016 GF_{163}	—	October 8, 2007	Mount Lemmon	Mount Lemmon Survey	·	560 m	MPC · JPL
605356	2016 GJ_{167}	—	October 2, 2003	Kitt Peak	Spacewatch	·	690 m	MPC · JPL
605357	2016 GC_{168}	—	April 22, 2009	Mount Lemmon	Mount Lemmon Survey	·	920 m	MPC · JPL
605358	2016 GD_{173}	—	March 20, 2001	Kitt Peak	Spacewatch	·	1.0 km	MPC · JPL
605359	2016 GU_{175}	—	November 13, 2010	Mount Lemmon	Mount Lemmon Survey	L4	7.1 km	MPC · JPL
605360	2016 GF_{176}	—	October 17, 2010	Mount Lemmon	Mount Lemmon Survey	·	790 m	MPC · JPL
605361	2016 GN_{176}	—	July 14, 2013	Haleakala	Pan-STARRS 1	(2076)	800 m	MPC · JPL
605362	2016 GY_{176}	—	March 13, 2012	Mount Lemmon	Mount Lemmon Survey	·	850 m	MPC · JPL
605363	2016 GO_{177}	—	March 6, 2016	Haleakala	Pan-STARRS 1	·	1.0 km	MPC · JPL
605364	2016 GR_{177}	—	November 20, 2014	Haleakala	Pan-STARRS 1	·	710 m	MPC · JPL
605365	2016 GG_{178}	—	July 19, 2006	Mauna Kea	P. A. Wiegert, D. Subasinghe	·	610 m	MPC · JPL
605366	2016 GF_{185}	—	May 4, 2005	Kitt Peak	Spacewatch	·	1.1 km	MPC · JPL
605367	2016 GO_{187}	—	September 11, 2007	Mount Lemmon	Mount Lemmon Survey	·	2.2 km	MPC · JPL
605368	2016 GQ_{190}	—	June 15, 2012	Kitt Peak	Spacewatch	·	920 m	MPC · JPL
605369	2016 GU_{191}	—	February 4, 2012	Haleakala	Pan-STARRS 1	·	850 m	MPC · JPL
605370	2016 GY_{191}	—	December 15, 2014	Mount Lemmon	Mount Lemmon Survey	BRG	1.3 km	MPC · JPL
605371	2016 GA_{192}	—	January 16, 2011	Mount Lemmon	Mount Lemmon Survey	·	1.3 km	MPC · JPL
605372	2016 GH_{192}	—	April 21, 1996	Kitt Peak	Spacewatch	·	670 m	MPC · JPL
605373	2016 GE_{193}	—	April 30, 2009	Kitt Peak	Spacewatch	·	570 m	MPC · JPL
605374	2016 GO_{193}	—	April 3, 2016	Haleakala	Pan-STARRS 1	·	820 m	MPC · JPL
605375	2016 GN_{198}	—	February 3, 2012	Haleakala	Pan-STARRS 1	V	560 m	MPC · JPL
605376	2016 GU_{199}	—	February 16, 2012	Haleakala	Pan-STARRS 1	·	1.4 km	MPC · JPL
605377	2016 GA_{203}	—	August 25, 2014	Haleakala	Pan-STARRS 1	·	640 m	MPC · JPL
605378	2016 GB_{204}	—	October 11, 2007	Mount Lemmon	Mount Lemmon Survey	·	750 m	MPC · JPL
605379	2016 GG_{204}	—	November 9, 2007	Mount Lemmon	Mount Lemmon Survey	·	640 m	MPC · JPL
605380	2016 GD_{206}	—	January 19, 2008	Mount Lemmon	Mount Lemmon Survey	·	1.4 km	MPC · JPL
605381	2016 GF_{206}	—	January 11, 2008	Kitt Peak	Spacewatch	PHO	700 m	MPC · JPL
605382	2016 GQ_{207}	—	October 31, 2013	Kitt Peak	Spacewatch	3:2	5.3 km	MPC · JPL
605383	2016 GY_{208}	—	October 4, 2014	Kitt Peak	Spacewatch	·	530 m	MPC · JPL
605384	2016 GS_{212}	—	October 23, 2003	Kitt Peak	Deep Ecliptic Survey	·	750 m	MPC · JPL
605385	2016 GP_{213}	—	June 8, 2005	Kitt Peak	Spacewatch	V	500 m	MPC · JPL
605386	2016 GC_{224}	—	July 14, 2013	Haleakala	Pan-STARRS 1	·	960 m	MPC · JPL
605387	2016 GE_{224}	—	September 26, 2006	Mount Lemmon	Mount Lemmon Survey	·	820 m	MPC · JPL
605388	2016 GA_{225}	—	December 30, 2011	Kitt Peak	Spacewatch	·	550 m	MPC · JPL
605389	2016 GM_{225}	—	June 29, 2005	Palomar	NEAT	·	1.3 km	MPC · JPL
605390	2016 GN_{227}	—	February 3, 2009	Kitt Peak	Spacewatch	·	510 m	MPC · JPL
605391	2016 GV_{229}	—	March 29, 2009	Kitt Peak	Spacewatch	·	590 m	MPC · JPL
605392	2016 GP_{234}	—	November 9, 2009	Mount Lemmon	Mount Lemmon Survey	·	2.4 km	MPC · JPL
605393	2016 GM_{240}	—	December 14, 2010	Kitt Peak	Spacewatch	HNS	920 m	MPC · JPL
605394	2016 GA_{242}	—	March 31, 2016	Mount Lemmon	Mount Lemmon Survey	·	1.4 km	MPC · JPL
605395	2016 GJ_{242}	—	September 12, 2007	Kitt Peak	Spacewatch	·	590 m	MPC · JPL
605396	2016 GC_{244}	—	June 1, 2005	Mount Lemmon	Mount Lemmon Survey	·	3.0 km	MPC · JPL
605397	2016 GR_{244}	—	May 21, 2006	Kitt Peak	Spacewatch	·	630 m	MPC · JPL
605398	2016 GO_{250}	—	May 10, 2005	Cerro Tololo	Deep Ecliptic Survey	NYS	1.0 km	MPC · JPL
605399	2016 GE_{251}	—	February 25, 2012	Kitt Peak	Spacewatch	·	1.0 km	MPC · JPL
605400	2016 GW_{251}	—	March 4, 2016	Haleakala	Pan-STARRS 1	V	540 m	MPC · JPL

== 605401–605500 ==
back to top

Designation			Discovery			Properties		Ref
Permanent	Provisional	Named after	Date	Site	Discoverer(s)	Category	Diam.	Ref
605401	2016 GF_{252}	—	September 17, 2014	Haleakala	Pan-STARRS 1	·	960 m	MPC · JPL
605402	2016 GJ_{260}	—	March 11, 2005	Mount Lemmon	Mount Lemmon Survey	MAS	620 m	MPC · JPL
605403	2016 GL_{260}	—	May 21, 2012	Mount Lemmon	Mount Lemmon Survey	·	950 m	MPC · JPL
605404	2016 GF_{267}	—	January 11, 2008	Kitt Peak	Spacewatch	·	900 m	MPC · JPL
605405	2016 GH_{268}	—	April 4, 2016	Mount Lemmon	Mount Lemmon Survey	·	1.1 km	MPC · JPL
605406	2016 GR_{268}	—	April 9, 2016	Haleakala	Pan-STARRS 1	·	1.1 km	MPC · JPL
605407	2016 GO_{282}	—	April 1, 2016	Haleakala	Pan-STARRS 1	·	1.8 km	MPC · JPL
605408	2016 GX_{284}	—	February 27, 2006	Mount Lemmon	Mount Lemmon Survey	HOF	2.0 km	MPC · JPL
605409	2016 GD_{291}	—	April 1, 2016	Haleakala	Pan-STARRS 1	HOF	2.0 km	MPC · JPL
605410	2016 GL_{300}	—	April 2, 2016	Haleakala	Pan-STARRS 1	EOS	1.5 km	MPC · JPL
605411	2016 GC_{305}	—	April 12, 2016	Haleakala	Pan-STARRS 1	·	1.2 km	MPC · JPL
605412	2016 GW_{305}	—	April 1, 2016	Haleakala	Pan-STARRS 1	·	850 m	MPC · JPL
605413	2016 HG	—	April 18, 2016	Mount Lemmon	Mount Lemmon Survey	·	470 m	MPC · JPL
605414	2016 HN_{7}	—	February 16, 2005	La Silla	A. Boattini	·	910 m	MPC · JPL
605415	2016 HP_{8}	—	March 13, 2005	Kitt Peak	Spacewatch	·	750 m	MPC · JPL
605416	2016 HW_{18}	—	September 14, 2007	Mount Lemmon	Mount Lemmon Survey	·	2.2 km	MPC · JPL
605417	2016 HR_{20}	—	February 16, 2012	Haleakala	Pan-STARRS 1	·	810 m	MPC · JPL
605418	2016 HR_{31}	—	April 30, 2016	Haleakala	Pan-STARRS 1	L4	6.1 km	MPC · JPL
605419	2016 JV_{4}	—	February 20, 2012	Mount Graham	Boyle, R. P.	NYS	1.1 km	MPC · JPL
605420	2016 JA_{7}	—	February 11, 2016	Haleakala	Pan-STARRS 1	·	830 m	MPC · JPL
605421	2016 JR_{8}	—	April 2, 2016	Haleakala	Pan-STARRS 1	·	1.8 km	MPC · JPL
605422	2016 JZ_{8}	—	February 12, 2016	Haleakala	Pan-STARRS 1	·	840 m	MPC · JPL
605423	2016 JF_{14}	—	March 27, 2012	Mount Lemmon	Mount Lemmon Survey	PHO	940 m	MPC · JPL
605424	2016 JA_{17}	—	April 20, 2013	Charleston	R. Holmes	·	1.2 km	MPC · JPL
605425	2016 JE_{24}	—	June 9, 2012	Nogales	M. Schwartz, P. R. Holvorcem	·	1.0 km	MPC · JPL
605426	2016 JF_{24}	—	March 4, 2016	Haleakala	Pan-STARRS 1	V	620 m	MPC · JPL
605427	2016 JG_{24}	—	September 4, 2013	Mount Lemmon	Mount Lemmon Survey	·	1.5 km	MPC · JPL
605428	2016 JO_{26}	—	February 7, 2008	Kitt Peak	Spacewatch	NYS	1.3 km	MPC · JPL
605429	2016 JF_{28}	—	October 6, 2013	Catalina	CSS	·	1.0 km	MPC · JPL
605430	2016 JY_{35}	—	February 10, 2008	Kitt Peak	Spacewatch	NYS	1.4 km	MPC · JPL
605431	2016 JP_{37}	—	May 8, 2011	Mount Lemmon	Mount Lemmon Survey	·	2.6 km	MPC · JPL
605432	2016 JZ_{40}	—	November 10, 2013	Mount Lemmon	Mount Lemmon Survey	EUN	1.1 km	MPC · JPL
605433	2016 JL_{41}	—	May 3, 2016	Haleakala	Pan-STARRS 1	·	1.2 km	MPC · JPL
605434	2016 JW_{41}	—	January 22, 2015	Haleakala	Pan-STARRS 1	MAR	660 m	MPC · JPL
605435	2016 JE_{42}	—	May 3, 2016	Mount Lemmon	Mount Lemmon Survey	·	860 m	MPC · JPL
605436	2016 KR_{1}	—	April 20, 2006	Siding Spring	SSS	PHO	1.1 km	MPC · JPL
605437	2016 KT_{1}	—	April 1, 2016	Mount Lemmon	Mount Lemmon Survey	H	420 m	MPC · JPL
605438	2016 KM_{5}	—	September 6, 2012	Haleakala	Pan-STARRS 1	·	1.1 km	MPC · JPL
605439	2016 LW	—	August 13, 2006	Palomar	NEAT	·	820 m	MPC · JPL
605440	2016 LU_{3}	—	February 11, 2013	Haleakala	Pan-STARRS 1	H	480 m	MPC · JPL
605441	2016 LY_{4}	—	January 4, 2013	Kitt Peak	Spacewatch	L4	9.9 km	MPC · JPL
605442	2016 LT_{7}	—	September 17, 2003	Kitt Peak	Spacewatch	·	720 m	MPC · JPL
605443	2016 LY_{12}	—	April 12, 2012	Haleakala	Pan-STARRS 1	·	920 m	MPC · JPL
605444	2016 LY_{20}	—	November 2, 2010	Kitt Peak	Spacewatch	L4	7.1 km	MPC · JPL
605445	2016 LP_{22}	—	February 13, 2012	Haleakala	Pan-STARRS 1	·	810 m	MPC · JPL
605446	2016 LY_{23}	—	October 2, 2002	Haleakala	NEAT	V	790 m	MPC · JPL
605447	2016 LN_{24}	—	May 30, 2016	Haleakala	Pan-STARRS 1	·	1.1 km	MPC · JPL
605448	2016 LD_{27}	—	October 9, 2008	Mount Lemmon	Mount Lemmon Survey	·	1.1 km	MPC · JPL
605449	2016 LP_{28}	—	October 2, 2013	Haleakala	Pan-STARRS 1	·	1.4 km	MPC · JPL
605450	2016 LU_{30}	—	March 7, 2008	Mount Lemmon	Mount Lemmon Survey	·	1.0 km	MPC · JPL
605451	2016 LR_{37}	—	April 2, 2009	Mount Lemmon	Mount Lemmon Survey	·	570 m	MPC · JPL
605452	2016 LM_{39}	—	June 5, 2016	Haleakala	Pan-STARRS 1	·	850 m	MPC · JPL
605453	2016 LC_{43}	—	March 31, 2003	Kitt Peak	Spacewatch	·	1.4 km	MPC · JPL
605454	2016 LA_{45}	—	September 19, 2003	Kitt Peak	Spacewatch	AGN	1.1 km	MPC · JPL
605455	2016 LR_{54}	—	June 7, 2016	Haleakala	Pan-STARRS 1	·	2.7 km	MPC · JPL
605456	2016 LW_{55}	—	September 18, 2003	Palomar	NEAT	EUN	1.4 km	MPC · JPL
605457	2016 LH_{56}	—	February 28, 2006	Mount Lemmon	Mount Lemmon Survey	·	1.4 km	MPC · JPL
605458	2016 LP_{57}	—	June 7, 2016	Haleakala	Pan-STARRS 1	·	2.7 km	MPC · JPL
605459	2016 LF_{58}	—	May 13, 2015	Mount Lemmon	Mount Lemmon Survey	MAR	960 m	MPC · JPL
605460	2016 LJ_{60}	—	June 5, 2016	Haleakala	Pan-STARRS 1	HNS	720 m	MPC · JPL
605461	2016 LB_{61}	—	September 19, 2001	Kitt Peak	Spacewatch	·	1.5 km	MPC · JPL
605462	2016 LR_{61}	—	April 13, 2011	Mount Lemmon	Mount Lemmon Survey	·	1.2 km	MPC · JPL
605463	2016 LT_{61}	—	December 9, 2006	Palomar	NEAT	URS	4.0 km	MPC · JPL
605464	2016 LC_{62}	—	June 7, 2016	Haleakala	Pan-STARRS 1	·	1.7 km	MPC · JPL
605465	2016 LN_{64}	—	February 20, 2015	Haleakala	Pan-STARRS 1	EUN	870 m	MPC · JPL
605466	2016 LG_{66}	—	February 12, 2008	Mount Lemmon	Mount Lemmon Survey	·	1.0 km	MPC · JPL
605467	2016 LZ_{67}	—	March 18, 2016	Haleakala	Pan-STARRS 1	BAR	1.2 km	MPC · JPL
605468	2016 LG_{68}	—	September 14, 2007	Mount Lemmon	Mount Lemmon Survey	·	1.9 km	MPC · JPL
605469	2016 LO_{76}	—	June 8, 2016	Haleakala	Pan-STARRS 1	·	950 m	MPC · JPL
605470	2016 LQ_{76}	—	June 7, 2016	Haleakala	Pan-STARRS 1	EOS	1.3 km	MPC · JPL
605471	2016 LM_{80}	—	June 7, 2016	Haleakala	Pan-STARRS 1	·	2.8 km	MPC · JPL
605472	2016 ME	—	May 14, 2002	Palomar	NEAT	PHO	1.4 km	MPC · JPL
605473	2016 MO_{1}	—	July 24, 2001	Palomar	NEAT	·	2.5 km	MPC · JPL
605474	2016 ME_{2}	—	April 11, 2005	Mount Lemmon	Mount Lemmon Survey	·	970 m	MPC · JPL
605475	2016 MP_{2}	—	June 5, 2016	Haleakala	Pan-STARRS 1	·	840 m	MPC · JPL
605476	2016 MO_{3}	—	September 20, 2003	Palomar	NEAT	EUN	1.4 km	MPC · JPL
605477	2016 MR_{3}	—	June 29, 2016	Haleakala	Pan-STARRS 1	·	2.6 km	MPC · JPL
605478	2016 NM	—	September 14, 2013	Haleakala	Pan-STARRS 1	·	690 m	MPC · JPL
605479	2016 NM_{5}	—	October 17, 2012	Mount Lemmon	Mount Lemmon Survey	·	1.7 km	MPC · JPL
605480	2016 NO_{7}	—	August 8, 2012	Haleakala	Pan-STARRS 1	·	1.2 km	MPC · JPL
605481	2016 NN_{8}	—	December 8, 2005	Kitt Peak	Spacewatch	·	1.4 km	MPC · JPL
605482	2016 NN_{11}	—	August 27, 2009	Kitt Peak	Spacewatch	·	880 m	MPC · JPL
605483	2016 NH_{12}	—	January 1, 2014	Mount Lemmon	Mount Lemmon Survey	·	710 m	MPC · JPL
605484	2016 NU_{12}	—	November 27, 2013	Haleakala	Pan-STARRS 1	·	1.1 km	MPC · JPL
605485	2016 ND_{13}	—	April 14, 2008	Mount Lemmon	Mount Lemmon Survey	V	510 m	MPC · JPL
605486	2016 NG_{16}	—	October 11, 2006	Palomar	NEAT	·	680 m	MPC · JPL
605487	2016 NL_{18}	—	November 12, 2010	Mount Lemmon	Mount Lemmon Survey	·	590 m	MPC · JPL
605488	2016 NO_{19}	—	September 23, 2009	Mount Lemmon	Mount Lemmon Survey	·	770 m	MPC · JPL
605489	2016 NW_{22}	—	September 13, 2013	Kitt Peak	Spacewatch	AMO	210 m	MPC · JPL
605490	2016 NZ_{24}	—	April 9, 2003	Palomar	NEAT	·	1.3 km	MPC · JPL
605491	2016 NQ_{25}	—	April 6, 2011	Kitt Peak	Spacewatch	MAR	730 m	MPC · JPL
605492	2016 ND_{27}	—	March 29, 2014	Mount Lemmon	Mount Lemmon Survey	LUT	3.3 km	MPC · JPL
605493	2016 NH_{28}	—	April 20, 2007	Mount Lemmon	Mount Lemmon Survey	·	1.3 km	MPC · JPL
605494	2016 ND_{32}	—	July 30, 2005	Palomar	NEAT	·	3.1 km	MPC · JPL
605495	2016 NC_{36}	—	June 17, 2012	Mount Lemmon	Mount Lemmon Survey	MAR	1.1 km	MPC · JPL
605496	2016 NV_{39}	—	February 9, 2014	Haleakala	Pan-STARRS 1	·	1.7 km	MPC · JPL
605497	2016 NO_{42}	—	September 26, 2003	Apache Point	SDSS Collaboration	NEM	1.8 km	MPC · JPL
605498	2016 NQ_{42}	—	April 20, 2009	Kitt Peak	Spacewatch	·	550 m	MPC · JPL
605499 Krupko	2016 NT_{42}	Krupko	August 30, 2011	Zelenchukskaya Stn	T. V. Krjačko, Satovski, B.	EOS	2.3 km	MPC · JPL
605500	2016 NP_{44}	—	February 9, 2015	Mount Lemmon	Mount Lemmon Survey	·	660 m	MPC · JPL

== 605501–605600 ==
back to top

Designation			Discovery			Properties		Ref
Permanent	Provisional	Named after	Date	Site	Discoverer(s)	Category	Diam.	Ref
605501	2016 NO_{47}	—	July 5, 2016	Mount Lemmon	Mount Lemmon Survey	·	870 m	MPC · JPL
605502	2016 NF_{48}	—	June 18, 2005	Mount Lemmon	Mount Lemmon Survey	·	900 m	MPC · JPL
605503	2016 NZ_{48}	—	October 22, 2006	Catalina	CSS	·	630 m	MPC · JPL
605504	2016 NX_{51}	—	September 30, 2006	Mount Lemmon	Mount Lemmon Survey	·	570 m	MPC · JPL
605505	2016 NR_{63}	—	July 12, 2016	Mount Lemmon	Mount Lemmon Survey	·	750 m	MPC · JPL
605506	2016 ND_{67}	—	July 11, 2016	Haleakala	Pan-STARRS 1	·	1.7 km	MPC · JPL
605507	2016 NW_{67}	—	September 21, 2000	Kitt Peak	Deep Ecliptic Survey	·	2.0 km	MPC · JPL
605508	2016 NP_{68}	—	August 5, 2007	7300	W. K. Y. Yeung	·	1.9 km	MPC · JPL
605509	2016 NN_{69}	—	October 14, 2013	Kitt Peak	Spacewatch	·	1.2 km	MPC · JPL
605510	2016 NP_{69}	—	January 1, 2008	Mount Lemmon	Mount Lemmon Survey	EOS	1.8 km	MPC · JPL
605511	2016 NP_{71}	—	April 2, 2011	Kitt Peak	Spacewatch	·	1.0 km	MPC · JPL
605512	2016 NO_{72}	—	March 2, 2009	Kitt Peak	Spacewatch	·	1.7 km	MPC · JPL
605513	2016 NX_{74}	—	February 14, 2002	Kitt Peak	Spacewatch	·	1.2 km	MPC · JPL
605514	2016 NO_{75}	—	August 26, 2012	Haleakala	Pan-STARRS 1	·	1.2 km	MPC · JPL
605515	2016 NV_{76}	—	August 6, 2005	Palomar	NEAT	·	2.3 km	MPC · JPL
605516	2016 NP_{77}	—	November 20, 2008	Kitt Peak	Spacewatch	·	1.6 km	MPC · JPL
605517	2016 NY_{77}	—	July 5, 2016	Haleakala	Pan-STARRS 1	·	970 m	MPC · JPL
605518	2016 NW_{82}	—	July 11, 2016	Mount Lemmon	Mount Lemmon Survey	·	1.2 km	MPC · JPL
605519	2016 NU_{83}	—	November 21, 2006	Desert Moon	Stevens, B. L.	·	2.5 km	MPC · JPL
605520	2016 NK_{87}	—	January 21, 2015	Haleakala	Pan-STARRS 1	·	920 m	MPC · JPL
605521	2016 NP_{87}	—	April 1, 2015	Haleakala	Pan-STARRS 1	EUN	1.0 km	MPC · JPL
605522	2016 NY_{88}	—	September 24, 2011	Mount Lemmon	Mount Lemmon Survey	·	2.1 km	MPC · JPL
605523	2016 NF_{89}	—	October 1, 2000	Kitt Peak	Spacewatch	THM	1.6 km	MPC · JPL
605524	2016 NP_{96}	—	May 21, 2011	Mount Lemmon	Mount Lemmon Survey	·	1.3 km	MPC · JPL
605525	2016 NC_{105}	—	November 1, 2013	Mount Lemmon	Mount Lemmon Survey	·	900 m	MPC · JPL
605526	2016 NO_{109}	—	July 11, 2016	Haleakala	Pan-STARRS 1	·	660 m	MPC · JPL
605527	2016 NM_{110}	—	July 13, 2016	Haleakala	Pan-STARRS 1	·	2.5 km	MPC · JPL
605528	2016 NU_{112}	—	July 14, 2016	Haleakala	Pan-STARRS 1	·	1.1 km	MPC · JPL
605529	2016 NM_{119}	—	July 14, 2016	Mount Lemmon	Mount Lemmon Survey	·	2.5 km	MPC · JPL
605530	2016 NO_{119}	—	July 5, 2016	Haleakala	Pan-STARRS 1	·	2.2 km	MPC · JPL
605531	2016 NX_{119}	—	July 14, 2016	Haleakala	Pan-STARRS 1	·	820 m	MPC · JPL
605532	2016 NM_{135}	—	July 11, 2016	Haleakala	Pan-STARRS 1	EUN	930 m	MPC · JPL
605533	2016 OZ_{1}	—	August 24, 2001	Anderson Mesa	LONEOS	·	1.5 km	MPC · JPL
605534	2016 OK_{3}	—	November 7, 2008	Mount Lemmon	Mount Lemmon Survey	EUN	780 m	MPC · JPL
605535	2016 OL_{3}	—	November 8, 2008	Mount Lemmon	Mount Lemmon Survey	JUN	690 m	MPC · JPL
605536	2016 OJ_{6}	—	January 18, 2004	Catalina	CSS	·	2.0 km	MPC · JPL
605537	2016 OX_{6}	—	September 24, 2008	Catalina	CSS	·	1.1 km	MPC · JPL
605538	2016 PW_{5}	—	June 6, 2011	Haleakala	Pan-STARRS 1	·	1.4 km	MPC · JPL
605539	2016 PA_{6}	—	January 18, 2015	Haleakala	Pan-STARRS 1	·	1.2 km	MPC · JPL
605540	2016 PT_{6}	—	November 9, 2013	Mount Lemmon	Mount Lemmon Survey	·	610 m	MPC · JPL
605541	2016 PP_{7}	—	October 23, 2008	Kitt Peak	Spacewatch	·	1.2 km	MPC · JPL
605542	2016 PS_{11}	—	October 12, 2013	Kitt Peak	Spacewatch	·	650 m	MPC · JPL
605543	2016 PA_{12}	—	October 29, 2011	Haleakala	Pan-STARRS 1	·	2.3 km	MPC · JPL
605544	2016 PR_{12}	—	November 26, 2013	Mount Lemmon	Mount Lemmon Survey	V	440 m	MPC · JPL
605545	2016 PW_{12}	—	April 25, 2015	Haleakala	Pan-STARRS 1	·	1.3 km	MPC · JPL
605546	2016 PH_{13}	—	May 19, 2005	Mount Lemmon	Mount Lemmon Survey	·	3.9 km	MPC · JPL
605547	2016 PN_{15}	—	May 12, 2007	Kitt Peak	Spacewatch	·	1.3 km	MPC · JPL
605548	2016 PA_{20}	—	August 7, 2016	Haleakala	Pan-STARRS 1	·	1.0 km	MPC · JPL
605549	2016 PE_{22}	—	October 31, 2008	Catalina	CSS	·	1.4 km	MPC · JPL
605550	2016 PR_{24}	—	April 24, 2015	Haleakala	Pan-STARRS 1	·	1.5 km	MPC · JPL
605551	2016 PO_{26}	—	September 21, 2000	Kitt Peak	Deep Ecliptic Survey	·	390 m	MPC · JPL
605552	2016 PK_{29}	—	January 17, 2015	Haleakala	Pan-STARRS 1	·	680 m	MPC · JPL
605553	2016 PK_{33}	—	September 28, 2009	Mount Lemmon	Mount Lemmon Survey	·	940 m	MPC · JPL
605554	2016 PG_{34}	—	August 7, 2016	Haleakala	Pan-STARRS 1	·	2.4 km	MPC · JPL
605555	2016 PX_{37}	—	July 26, 2016	Kitt Peak	Spacewatch	EOS	1.5 km	MPC · JPL
605556	2016 PS_{40}	—	April 23, 2015	Haleakala	Pan-STARRS 1	·	2.1 km	MPC · JPL
605557	2016 PN_{42}	—	January 24, 2014	Haleakala	Pan-STARRS 1	ADE	1.6 km	MPC · JPL
605558	2016 PU_{43}	—	November 14, 2007	Kitt Peak	Spacewatch	·	1.5 km	MPC · JPL
605559	2016 PY_{45}	—	May 24, 2015	Mount Lemmon	Mount Lemmon Survey	EOS	1.7 km	MPC · JPL
605560	2016 PF_{46}	—	July 8, 2016	Haleakala	Pan-STARRS 1	·	1.1 km	MPC · JPL
605561	2016 PN_{46}	—	October 31, 2008	Kitt Peak	Spacewatch	·	1.2 km	MPC · JPL
605562	2016 PY_{54}	—	February 24, 2014	Haleakala	Pan-STARRS 1	·	1.6 km	MPC · JPL
605563	2016 PP_{56}	—	April 25, 2015	Haleakala	Pan-STARRS 1	·	1.3 km	MPC · JPL
605564	2016 PO_{68}	—	August 9, 2016	Haleakala	Pan-STARRS 1	·	1.1 km	MPC · JPL
605565	2016 PX_{70}	—	August 9, 2016	Haleakala	Pan-STARRS 1	·	1.3 km	MPC · JPL
605566	2016 PD_{72}	—	March 27, 2015	Haleakala	Pan-STARRS 1	·	1.1 km	MPC · JPL
605567	2016 PY_{72}	—	August 5, 2002	Palomar	NEAT	·	770 m	MPC · JPL
605568	2016 PT_{73}	—	August 22, 2003	Palomar	NEAT	·	1.2 km	MPC · JPL
605569	2016 PU_{78}	—	July 31, 2005	Palomar	NEAT	TIR	3.3 km	MPC · JPL
605570	2016 PE_{85}	—	September 13, 2007	Mount Lemmon	Mount Lemmon Survey	·	1.2 km	MPC · JPL
605571	2016 PX_{97}	—	July 9, 2015	Haleakala	Pan-STARRS 1	EUN	1.1 km	MPC · JPL
605572	2016 PU_{99}	—	January 2, 2009	Mount Lemmon	Mount Lemmon Survey	HNS	1.2 km	MPC · JPL
605573	2016 PY_{100}	—	February 8, 2011	Mount Lemmon	Mount Lemmon Survey	·	860 m	MPC · JPL
605574	2016 PS_{101}	—	October 26, 2012	Mount Lemmon	Mount Lemmon Survey	ADE	1.8 km	MPC · JPL
605575	2016 PT_{101}	—	September 21, 2003	Kitt Peak	Spacewatch	HNS	1.1 km	MPC · JPL
605576	2016 PR_{102}	—	September 22, 2003	Kitt Peak	Spacewatch	·	1.4 km	MPC · JPL
605577	2016 PJ_{103}	—	March 5, 2006	Kitt Peak	Spacewatch	·	1.2 km	MPC · JPL
605578	2016 PE_{106}	—	August 1, 2016	Haleakala	Pan-STARRS 1	·	1.6 km	MPC · JPL
605579	2016 PJ_{107}	—	January 1, 2014	Haleakala	Pan-STARRS 1	·	860 m	MPC · JPL
605580	2016 PD_{108}	—	September 15, 2004	Kitt Peak	Spacewatch	·	910 m	MPC · JPL
605581	2016 PQ_{113}	—	April 25, 2015	Haleakala	Pan-STARRS 1	·	1.4 km	MPC · JPL
605582	2016 PV_{113}	—	August 2, 2016	Haleakala	Pan-STARRS 1	·	1.9 km	MPC · JPL
605583	2016 PB_{115}	—	April 23, 2015	Haleakala	Pan-STARRS 2	·	1.7 km	MPC · JPL
605584	2016 PJ_{116}	—	September 19, 1998	Apache Point	SDSS Collaboration	·	1.3 km	MPC · JPL
605585	2016 PT_{117}	—	September 9, 2008	Mount Lemmon	Mount Lemmon Survey	·	1.4 km	MPC · JPL
605586	2016 PZ_{118}	—	October 18, 2012	Haleakala	Pan-STARRS 1	HOF	2.1 km	MPC · JPL
605587	2016 PK_{122}	—	May 18, 2015	Haleakala	Pan-STARRS 1	·	1.3 km	MPC · JPL
605588	2016 PU_{123}	—	February 26, 2004	Kitt Peak	Deep Ecliptic Survey	KOR	1.3 km	MPC · JPL
605589	2016 PE_{128}	—	August 2, 2016	Haleakala	Pan-STARRS 1	·	1.4 km	MPC · JPL
605590	2016 PF_{132}	—	August 10, 2016	Haleakala	Pan-STARRS 1	HNS	880 m	MPC · JPL
605591	2016 PO_{143}	—	August 15, 2009	Kitt Peak	Spacewatch	·	670 m	MPC · JPL
605592	2016 PV_{146}	—	August 27, 2001	Kitt Peak	Spacewatch	NYS	870 m	MPC · JPL
605593	2016 PM_{151}	—	August 2, 2016	Haleakala	Pan-STARRS 1	·	1.6 km	MPC · JPL
605594	2016 PY_{174}	—	August 2, 2016	Haleakala	Pan-STARRS 1	·	1.0 km	MPC · JPL
605595	2016 PC_{184}	—	August 3, 2016	Haleakala	Pan-STARRS 1	·	1 km	MPC · JPL
605596	2016 PE_{186}	—	August 3, 2016	Haleakala	Pan-STARRS 1	·	910 m	MPC · JPL
605597	2016 PY_{218}	—	September 11, 2010	Mount Lemmon	Mount Lemmon Survey	·	2.6 km	MPC · JPL
605598	2016 QN	—	September 30, 2006	Mount Lemmon	Mount Lemmon Survey	V	670 m	MPC · JPL
605599	2016 QW	—	March 2, 2011	Kitt Peak	Spacewatch	·	1.5 km	MPC · JPL
605600	2016 QX	—	December 30, 2013	Haleakala	Pan-STARRS 1	·	1.2 km	MPC · JPL

== 605601–605700 ==
back to top

Designation			Discovery			Properties		Ref
Permanent	Provisional	Named after	Date	Site	Discoverer(s)	Category	Diam.	Ref
605601	2016 QC_{4}	—	January 23, 2011	Mount Lemmon	Mount Lemmon Survey	·	910 m	MPC · JPL
605602	2016 QG_{6}	—	July 6, 2016	Haleakala	Pan-STARRS 1	·	1.9 km	MPC · JPL
605603	2016 QW_{6}	—	February 17, 2007	Mount Lemmon	Mount Lemmon Survey	·	1.4 km	MPC · JPL
605604	2016 QF_{8}	—	February 9, 2005	Kitt Peak	Spacewatch	WIT	800 m	MPC · JPL
605605	2016 QU_{8}	—	January 23, 2014	Mount Lemmon	Mount Lemmon Survey	·	1.4 km	MPC · JPL
605606	2016 QC_{9}	—	January 31, 2011	Piszkés-tető	K. Sárneczky, Z. Kuli	·	580 m	MPC · JPL
605607	2016 QH_{9}	—	November 7, 2008	Mount Lemmon	Mount Lemmon Survey	·	1.6 km	MPC · JPL
605608	2016 QK_{9}	—	February 14, 2010	Kitt Peak	Spacewatch	HNS	880 m	MPC · JPL
605609	2016 QZ_{11}	—	March 5, 2006	Mount Lemmon	Mount Lemmon Survey	·	1.4 km	MPC · JPL
605610	2016 QG_{23}	—	July 5, 2005	Kitt Peak	Spacewatch	·	840 m	MPC · JPL
605611	2016 QL_{26}	—	September 28, 2003	Kitt Peak	Spacewatch	·	1.6 km	MPC · JPL
605612	2016 QR_{26}	—	January 23, 2015	Haleakala	Pan-STARRS 1	·	1.8 km	MPC · JPL
605613	2016 QH_{29}	—	September 19, 2007	Kitt Peak	Spacewatch	·	1.7 km	MPC · JPL
605614	2016 QQ_{29}	—	September 6, 2008	Mount Lemmon	Mount Lemmon Survey	·	800 m	MPC · JPL
605615	2016 QV_{30}	—	September 9, 2007	Kitt Peak	Spacewatch	·	2.1 km	MPC · JPL
605616	2016 QF_{32}	—	May 28, 2009	Mount Lemmon	Mount Lemmon Survey	·	730 m	MPC · JPL
605617	2016 QR_{33}	—	May 24, 2011	Nogales	M. Schwartz, P. R. Holvorcem	·	2.0 km	MPC · JPL
605618	2016 QF_{34}	—	February 4, 2006	Mount Lemmon	Mount Lemmon Survey	·	1.5 km	MPC · JPL
605619	2016 QC_{35}	—	June 4, 2011	Mount Lemmon	Mount Lemmon Survey	·	1.3 km	MPC · JPL
605620	2016 QP_{36}	—	January 25, 2015	Haleakala	Pan-STARRS 1	(194)	1.3 km	MPC · JPL
605621	2016 QB_{38}	—	February 26, 2008	Mount Lemmon	Mount Lemmon Survey	VER	2.8 km	MPC · JPL
605622	2016 QK_{38}	—	August 3, 2016	Haleakala	Pan-STARRS 1	MAR	740 m	MPC · JPL
605623	2016 QK_{39}	—	March 5, 2008	Mount Lemmon	Mount Lemmon Survey	PHO	780 m	MPC · JPL
605624	2016 QG_{40}	—	June 1, 2008	Mount Lemmon	Mount Lemmon Survey	·	1.3 km	MPC · JPL
605625	2016 QR_{42}	—	September 30, 2003	Kitt Peak	Spacewatch	·	1.6 km	MPC · JPL
605626	2016 QN_{43}	—	September 13, 2007	Mount Lemmon	Mount Lemmon Survey	·	2.4 km	MPC · JPL
605627	2016 QT_{43}	—	October 20, 2012	Haleakala	Pan-STARRS 1	ADE	1.5 km	MPC · JPL
605628	2016 QY_{43}	—	October 8, 2002	Kitt Peak	Spacewatch	·	670 m	MPC · JPL
605629	2016 QQ_{47}	—	November 27, 2013	Haleakala	Pan-STARRS 1	V	500 m	MPC · JPL
605630	2016 QN_{49}	—	July 14, 2016	Haleakala	Pan-STARRS 1	MAS	710 m	MPC · JPL
605631	2016 QW_{51}	—	September 20, 2003	Kitt Peak	Spacewatch	·	1.6 km	MPC · JPL
605632	2016 QB_{52}	—	May 30, 2011	Haleakala	Pan-STARRS 1	·	1.5 km	MPC · JPL
605633	2016 QR_{57}	—	September 6, 2008	Kitt Peak	Spacewatch	MAR	880 m	MPC · JPL
605634	2016 QD_{60}	—	September 20, 2011	Kitt Peak	Spacewatch	EOS	1.4 km	MPC · JPL
605635	2016 QZ_{60}	—	June 13, 2015	Haleakala	Pan-STARRS 1	·	2.6 km	MPC · JPL
605636	2016 QR_{62}	—	September 10, 2007	Mount Lemmon	Mount Lemmon Survey	·	1.6 km	MPC · JPL
605637	2016 QG_{66}	—	October 5, 2011	Les Engarouines	L. Bernasconi	·	2.7 km	MPC · JPL
605638	2016 QE_{67}	—	September 3, 2008	Kitt Peak	Spacewatch	EUN	1 km	MPC · JPL
605639	2016 QL_{67}	—	January 20, 2015	Haleakala	Pan-STARRS 1	V	750 m	MPC · JPL
605640	2016 QV_{67}	—	August 26, 2012	Haleakala	Pan-STARRS 1	·	1.4 km	MPC · JPL
605641	2016 QK_{70}	—	October 24, 2008	Kitt Peak	Spacewatch	·	1.8 km	MPC · JPL
605642	2016 QF_{72}	—	May 8, 2008	Mount Lemmon	Mount Lemmon Survey	·	780 m	MPC · JPL
605643	2016 QJ_{72}	—	October 8, 2012	Mount Lemmon	Mount Lemmon Survey	·	1.4 km	MPC · JPL
605644	2016 QA_{73}	—	October 26, 2013	Mount Lemmon	Mount Lemmon Survey	·	560 m	MPC · JPL
605645	2016 QS_{73}	—	June 8, 2005	Kitt Peak	Spacewatch	·	800 m	MPC · JPL
605646	2016 QB_{77}	—	November 21, 2009	Kitt Peak	Spacewatch	PHO	750 m	MPC · JPL
605647	2016 QG_{77}	—	September 16, 2012	Catalina	CSS	·	1.6 km	MPC · JPL
605648	2016 QX_{77}	—	June 4, 2003	Kitt Peak	Spacewatch	·	2.0 km	MPC · JPL
605649	2016 QB_{79}	—	October 4, 2011	Piszkéstető	K. Sárneczky	·	3.5 km	MPC · JPL
605650	2016 QM_{80}	—	July 7, 2016	Mount Lemmon	Mount Lemmon Survey	EUN	870 m	MPC · JPL
605651	2016 QR_{81}	—	April 18, 2015	Kitt Peak	Spacewatch	BRG	1.3 km	MPC · JPL
605652	2016 QY_{82}	—	July 30, 2016	Haleakala	Pan-STARRS 1	EUN	1.0 km	MPC · JPL
605653	2016 QM_{86}	—	December 3, 2012	Mount Lemmon	Mount Lemmon Survey	·	1.8 km	MPC · JPL
605654	2016 QX_{86}	—	September 9, 2007	Kitt Peak	Spacewatch	·	1.6 km	MPC · JPL
605655	2016 QD_{91}	—	May 21, 2015	Haleakala	Pan-STARRS 1	·	1.2 km	MPC · JPL
605656	2016 QF_{94}	—	August 30, 2016	Haleakala	Pan-STARRS 1	·	680 m	MPC · JPL
605657	2016 QH_{94}	—	May 22, 2015	Haleakala	Pan-STARRS 1	·	1.1 km	MPC · JPL
605658	2016 QG_{95}	—	August 30, 2016	Mount Lemmon	Mount Lemmon Survey	·	1.4 km	MPC · JPL
605659	2016 QV_{105}	—	August 29, 2016	Mount Lemmon	Mount Lemmon Survey	·	1.8 km	MPC · JPL
605660	2016 QB_{115}	—	August 27, 2016	Haleakala	Pan-STARRS 1	EUN	890 m	MPC · JPL
605661	2016 QG_{121}	—	August 26, 2016	Haleakala	Pan-STARRS 1	·	2.2 km	MPC · JPL
605662	2016 QF_{124}	—	August 17, 2016	Haleakala	Pan-STARRS 1	·	940 m	MPC · JPL
605663	2016 QT_{134}	—	August 28, 2016	Mount Lemmon	Mount Lemmon Survey	KOR	1.1 km	MPC · JPL
605664	2016 RF_{2}	—	June 7, 2011	Mount Lemmon	Mount Lemmon Survey	·	1.3 km	MPC · JPL
605665	2016 RR_{3}	—	March 14, 2011	Mount Lemmon	Mount Lemmon Survey	·	1.5 km	MPC · JPL
605666	2016 RH_{4}	—	March 4, 2005	Kitt Peak	Spacewatch	·	1.8 km	MPC · JPL
605667	2016 RW_{5}	—	September 21, 2009	Kitt Peak	Spacewatch	·	850 m	MPC · JPL
605668	2016 RH_{6}	—	September 17, 2003	Kitt Peak	Spacewatch	·	490 m	MPC · JPL
605669	2016 RP_{8}	—	January 28, 2015	Haleakala	Pan-STARRS 1	·	1.5 km	MPC · JPL
605670	2016 RF_{10}	—	February 9, 2014	Haleakala	Pan-STARRS 1	·	2.3 km	MPC · JPL
605671	2016 RN_{13}	—	September 30, 2011	Kitt Peak	Spacewatch	·	3.3 km	MPC · JPL
605672	2016 RV_{18}	—	January 15, 2015	Haleakala	Pan-STARRS 1	H	340 m	MPC · JPL
605673	2016 RH_{19}	—	June 4, 2013	Mount Lemmon	Mount Lemmon Survey	H	460 m	MPC · JPL
605674	2016 RO_{23}	—	May 9, 2006	Mount Lemmon	Mount Lemmon Survey	DOR	2.1 km	MPC · JPL
605675	2016 RH_{25}	—	April 12, 2015	Haleakala	Pan-STARRS 1	·	1.9 km	MPC · JPL
605676	2016 RU_{26}	—	April 1, 2008	Mount Lemmon	Mount Lemmon Survey	·	1.1 km	MPC · JPL
605677	2016 RX_{27}	—	September 9, 2016	Mount Lemmon	Mount Lemmon Survey	·	2.1 km	MPC · JPL
605678	2016 RS_{29}	—	September 18, 2003	Kitt Peak	Spacewatch	·	1.2 km	MPC · JPL
605679	2016 RJ_{31}	—	October 10, 2007	Kitt Peak	Spacewatch	·	1.8 km	MPC · JPL
605680	2016 RY_{31}	—	February 27, 2014	Haleakala	Pan-STARRS 1	·	1.3 km	MPC · JPL
605681	2016 RK_{32}	—	February 14, 2013	Catalina	CSS	·	3.3 km	MPC · JPL
605682	2016 RD_{35}	—	November 24, 2003	Kitt Peak	Spacewatch	·	500 m	MPC · JPL
605683	2016 RP_{36}	—	January 23, 2015	Haleakala	Pan-STARRS 1	(194)	1.5 km	MPC · JPL
605684	2016 RE_{38}	—	April 23, 2011	Kitt Peak	Spacewatch	·	1.2 km	MPC · JPL
605685	2016 RE_{43}	—	September 2, 2016	Mount Lemmon	Mount Lemmon Survey	·	1.3 km	MPC · JPL
605686	2016 RA_{44}	—	September 12, 2016	Mount Lemmon	Mount Lemmon Survey	·	1.1 km	MPC · JPL
605687	2016 RE_{45}	—	September 8, 2016	Haleakala	Pan-STARRS 1	·	1.0 km	MPC · JPL
605688	2016 RQ_{45}	—	October 19, 2012	Mount Lemmon	Mount Lemmon Survey	NEM	2.0 km	MPC · JPL
605689	2016 RE_{59}	—	September 2, 2016	Mount Lemmon	Mount Lemmon Survey	·	1.5 km	MPC · JPL
605690	2016 RD_{60}	—	August 26, 2012	Haleakala	Pan-STARRS 1	V	460 m	MPC · JPL
605691	2016 RO_{63}	—	September 10, 2016	Mount Lemmon	Mount Lemmon Survey	·	1.5 km	MPC · JPL
605692	2016 SF_{4}	—	August 30, 2016	Haleakala	Pan-STARRS 1	GAL	1.2 km	MPC · JPL
605693	2016 ST_{4}	—	September 13, 2007	Catalina	CSS	·	2.0 km	MPC · JPL
605694	2016 SZ_{9}	—	October 14, 2012	Kitt Peak	Spacewatch	·	1.5 km	MPC · JPL
605695	2016 SZ_{11}	—	September 12, 2002	Palomar	NEAT	·	2.0 km	MPC · JPL
605696	2016 SJ_{13}	—	September 21, 2012	Kitt Peak	Spacewatch	·	1.3 km	MPC · JPL
605697	2016 ST_{15}	—	March 29, 2012	Mount Lemmon	Mount Lemmon Survey	·	600 m	MPC · JPL
605698	2016 SV_{17}	—	March 16, 2015	Kitt Peak	Spacewatch	·	1.1 km	MPC · JPL
605699	2016 SP_{18}	—	July 25, 2011	Haleakala	Pan-STARRS 1	·	1.8 km	MPC · JPL
605700	2016 SR_{18}	—	September 16, 2002	Palomar	NEAT	·	2.9 km	MPC · JPL

== 605701–605800 ==
back to top

Designation			Discovery			Properties		Ref
Permanent	Provisional	Named after	Date	Site	Discoverer(s)	Category	Diam.	Ref
605701	2016 SL_{22}	—	November 18, 2003	Kitt Peak	Spacewatch	·	1.2 km	MPC · JPL
605702	2016 SO_{22}	—	September 30, 2005	Mount Lemmon	Mount Lemmon Survey	MAS	540 m	MPC · JPL
605703	2016 SK_{25}	—	February 20, 2006	Kitt Peak	Spacewatch	·	1.2 km	MPC · JPL
605704	2016 SF_{26}	—	August 3, 2016	Haleakala	Pan-STARRS 1	·	950 m	MPC · JPL
605705	2016 ST_{27}	—	June 3, 2011	Mount Lemmon	Mount Lemmon Survey	·	1.4 km	MPC · JPL
605706	2016 SB_{29}	—	May 27, 2012	Mount Lemmon	Mount Lemmon Survey	·	580 m	MPC · JPL
605707	2016 SO_{29}	—	May 12, 2015	Mount Lemmon	Mount Lemmon Survey	·	1.2 km	MPC · JPL
605708	2016 SC_{31}	—	September 25, 2011	Haleakala	Pan-STARRS 1	·	1.8 km	MPC · JPL
605709	2016 SN_{33}	—	October 17, 2012	Haleakala	Pan-STARRS 1	·	940 m	MPC · JPL
605710	2016 SP_{34}	—	June 2, 2005	Mount Lemmon	Mount Lemmon Survey	(16286)	2.2 km	MPC · JPL
605711	2016 SQ_{39}	—	July 30, 2016	Haleakala	Pan-STARRS 1	PHO	810 m	MPC · JPL
605712	2016 SU_{39}	—	November 9, 2007	Kitt Peak	Spacewatch	KOR	1.3 km	MPC · JPL
605713	2016 SL_{40}	—	March 20, 2010	Mount Lemmon	Mount Lemmon Survey	EUN	890 m	MPC · JPL
605714	2016 SV_{41}	—	February 28, 2014	Haleakala	Pan-STARRS 1	·	1.3 km	MPC · JPL
605715	2016 SO_{43}	—	June 30, 2005	Kitt Peak	Spacewatch	·	900 m	MPC · JPL
605716	2016 SP_{50}	—	January 31, 2009	Mount Lemmon	Mount Lemmon Survey	·	1.6 km	MPC · JPL
605717	2016 SQ_{51}	—	October 10, 2007	Kitt Peak	Spacewatch	·	1.7 km	MPC · JPL
605718	2016 SG_{54}	—	October 31, 2005	Mauna Kea	A. Boattini	·	1.4 km	MPC · JPL
605719	2016 SH_{55}	—	September 30, 2016	Haleakala	Pan-STARRS 1	KOR	1.2 km	MPC · JPL
605720	2016 SP_{64}	—	March 12, 2011	Mount Lemmon	Mount Lemmon Survey	V	510 m	MPC · JPL
605721	2016 SP_{73}	—	September 27, 2016	Haleakala	Pan-STARRS 1	·	2.5 km	MPC · JPL
605722	2016 SH_{74}	—	September 27, 2016	Mount Lemmon	Mount Lemmon Survey	·	1.5 km	MPC · JPL
605723	2016 SK_{74}	—	September 27, 2016	Haleakala	Pan-STARRS 1	·	1.4 km	MPC · JPL
605724	2016 SE_{75}	—	September 27, 2016	Mount Lemmon	Mount Lemmon Survey	·	1.2 km	MPC · JPL
605725	2016 SM_{77}	—	September 26, 2016	Haleakala	Pan-STARRS 1	·	950 m	MPC · JPL
605726	2016 SK_{81}	—	September 25, 2016	Haleakala	Pan-STARRS 1	·	1.4 km	MPC · JPL
605727	2016 SY_{84}	—	September 27, 2016	Mount Lemmon	Mount Lemmon Survey	·	1.3 km	MPC · JPL
605728	2016 SA_{87}	—	September 27, 2016	Haleakala	Pan-STARRS 1	·	1.6 km	MPC · JPL
605729	2016 SJ_{101}	—	September 26, 2016	Haleakala	Pan-STARRS 1	·	1.1 km	MPC · JPL
605730	2016 SR_{104}	—	September 25, 2016	Haleakala	Pan-STARRS 1	·	2.2 km	MPC · JPL
605731	2016 SH_{105}	—	September 26, 2016	Haleakala	Pan-STARRS 1	·	1.7 km	MPC · JPL
605732	2016 TQ_{1}	—	February 25, 2014	Kitt Peak	Spacewatch	·	1.1 km	MPC · JPL
605733	2016 TV_{1}	—	December 4, 2007	Mount Lemmon	Mount Lemmon Survey	KOR	1.2 km	MPC · JPL
605734	2016 TE_{13}	—	September 19, 2003	Kitt Peak	Spacewatch	·	1.4 km	MPC · JPL
605735	2016 TM_{14}	—	August 3, 2016	Haleakala	Pan-STARRS 1	EUN	1.1 km	MPC · JPL
605736	2016 TC_{15}	—	May 15, 2015	Haleakala	Pan-STARRS 1	·	1 km	MPC · JPL
605737	2016 TE_{15}	—	October 14, 2007	Kitt Peak	Spacewatch	·	1.9 km	MPC · JPL
605738	2016 TQ_{15}	—	October 20, 2012	Haleakala	Pan-STARRS 1	·	1.1 km	MPC · JPL
605739	2016 TT_{17}	—	December 20, 2014	Haleakala	Pan-STARRS 1	H	380 m	MPC · JPL
605740	2016 TS_{20}	—	September 14, 2012	La Sagra	OAM	PHO	880 m	MPC · JPL
605741	2016 TL_{21}	—	October 20, 2004	Catalina	CSS	EUN	1.2 km	MPC · JPL
605742	2016 TN_{22}	—	October 14, 2012	ASC-Kislovodsk	Nevski, V., Zeloyniy, O.	MAR	910 m	MPC · JPL
605743	2016 TH_{24}	—	October 1, 2011	Mount Lemmon	Mount Lemmon Survey	H	320 m	MPC · JPL
605744	2016 TQ_{24}	—	October 22, 2003	Kitt Peak	Spacewatch	·	1.5 km	MPC · JPL
605745	2016 TE_{25}	—	November 26, 2012	Mount Lemmon	Mount Lemmon Survey	·	1.6 km	MPC · JPL
605746	2016 TD_{26}	—	October 10, 2012	Haleakala	Pan-STARRS 1	·	1.6 km	MPC · JPL
605747	2016 TR_{28}	—	March 22, 2015	Haleakala	Pan-STARRS 1	EUN	840 m	MPC · JPL
605748	2016 TD_{33}	—	August 23, 2003	Palomar	NEAT	·	2.3 km	MPC · JPL
605749	2016 TQ_{33}	—	February 26, 2014	Mount Lemmon	Mount Lemmon Survey	·	1.4 km	MPC · JPL
605750	2016 TE_{37}	—	February 14, 2005	Kitt Peak	Spacewatch	·	1.5 km	MPC · JPL
605751	2016 TP_{37}	—	October 1, 2003	Kitt Peak	Spacewatch	·	1.7 km	MPC · JPL
605752	2016 TN_{38}	—	September 19, 2003	Kitt Peak	Spacewatch	·	1.3 km	MPC · JPL
605753	2016 TR_{39}	—	January 28, 2014	Mount Lemmon	Mount Lemmon Survey	·	1.9 km	MPC · JPL
605754	2016 TE_{41}	—	September 13, 2007	Kitt Peak	Spacewatch	·	1.4 km	MPC · JPL
605755	2016 TL_{42}	—	April 6, 2005	Mount Lemmon	Mount Lemmon Survey	·	1.6 km	MPC · JPL
605756	2016 TC_{43}	—	September 13, 2007	Mount Lemmon	Mount Lemmon Survey	·	1.3 km	MPC · JPL
605757	2016 TL_{50}	—	March 13, 2010	Mount Lemmon	Mount Lemmon Survey	·	1.3 km	MPC · JPL
605758	2016 TQ_{50}	—	August 2, 2011	Haleakala	Pan-STARRS 1	·	1.9 km	MPC · JPL
605759	2016 TG_{51}	—	September 25, 2016	Haleakala	Pan-STARRS 1	·	1.9 km	MPC · JPL
605760	2016 TR_{57}	—	August 24, 2012	Mayhill-ISON	L. Elenin	·	1.1 km	MPC · JPL
605761	2016 TR_{58}	—	December 23, 2012	Haleakala	Pan-STARRS 1	·	1.8 km	MPC · JPL
605762	2016 TF_{59}	—	September 5, 2016	Mount Lemmon	Mount Lemmon Survey	·	1.6 km	MPC · JPL
605763	2016 TG_{59}	—	October 26, 2012	Mount Lemmon	Mount Lemmon Survey	·	1.6 km	MPC · JPL
605764	2016 TF_{62}	—	February 28, 2014	Haleakala	Pan-STARRS 1	·	1.6 km	MPC · JPL
605765	2016 TT_{64}	—	December 19, 2007	Mount Lemmon	Mount Lemmon Survey	·	1.7 km	MPC · JPL
605766	2016 TU_{66}	—	November 3, 1999	Socorro	LINEAR	(1547)	1.5 km	MPC · JPL
605767	2016 TD_{69}	—	October 8, 2016	Haleakala	Pan-STARRS 1	·	2.0 km	MPC · JPL
605768	2016 TA_{70}	—	August 17, 2016	Haleakala	Pan-STARRS 1	·	1.5 km	MPC · JPL
605769	2016 TY_{70}	—	September 20, 2003	Kitt Peak	Spacewatch	·	1.4 km	MPC · JPL
605770	2016 TW_{71}	—	October 9, 2016	Mount Lemmon	Mount Lemmon Survey	·	1.8 km	MPC · JPL
605771	2016 TD_{75}	—	October 9, 2016	Kitt Peak	Spacewatch	H	280 m	MPC · JPL
605772	2016 TJ_{75}	—	August 30, 2002	Palomar	NEAT	·	1.7 km	MPC · JPL
605773	2016 TN_{75}	—	November 1, 2007	Kitt Peak	Spacewatch	·	1.6 km	MPC · JPL
605774	2016 TL_{77}	—	April 25, 2015	Haleakala	Pan-STARRS 1	·	1.7 km	MPC · JPL
605775	2016 TG_{78}	—	April 26, 2011	Mount Lemmon	Mount Lemmon Survey	PHO	810 m	MPC · JPL
605776	2016 TY_{78}	—	September 13, 2007	Catalina	CSS	·	2.0 km	MPC · JPL
605777	2016 TD_{81}	—	October 9, 2002	Kitt Peak	Spacewatch	·	1.5 km	MPC · JPL
605778	2016 TU_{82}	—	October 8, 2007	Catalina	CSS	·	2.2 km	MPC · JPL
605779	2016 TL_{88}	—	October 21, 2011	Kitt Peak	Spacewatch	·	1.7 km	MPC · JPL
605780	2016 TG_{96}	—	October 5, 2016	Mount Lemmon	Mount Lemmon Survey	·	1.8 km	MPC · JPL
605781	2016 TZ_{99}	—	November 18, 2011	Mount Lemmon	Mount Lemmon Survey	·	1.7 km	MPC · JPL
605782	2016 TQ_{100}	—	October 6, 2016	Mount Lemmon	Mount Lemmon Survey	·	2.0 km	MPC · JPL
605783	2016 TD_{102}	—	October 13, 2016	Mount Lemmon	Mount Lemmon Survey	·	1.3 km	MPC · JPL
605784	2016 TK_{115}	—	August 10, 2007	Kitt Peak	Spacewatch	EUN	930 m	MPC · JPL
605785	2016 TD_{120}	—	October 2, 2016	Mount Lemmon	Mount Lemmon Survey	·	1.3 km	MPC · JPL
605786	2016 TP_{123}	—	October 7, 2016	Mount Lemmon	Mount Lemmon Survey	·	1.2 km	MPC · JPL
605787	2016 TA_{125}	—	October 8, 2016	Haleakala	Pan-STARRS 1	·	1.6 km	MPC · JPL
605788	2016 TT_{129}	—	October 7, 2016	Mount Lemmon	Mount Lemmon Survey	·	1.5 km	MPC · JPL
605789	2016 TP_{141}	—	October 12, 2016	Haleakala	Pan-STARRS 1	·	1.3 km	MPC · JPL
605790	2016 TB_{152}	—	October 7, 2016	Haleakala	Pan-STARRS 1	(5)	920 m	MPC · JPL
605791	2016 TE_{164}	—	October 8, 2016	Haleakala	Pan-STARRS 1	·	1.7 km	MPC · JPL
605792	2016 UE_{3}	—	February 6, 2014	Mount Lemmon	Mount Lemmon Survey	·	1.2 km	MPC · JPL
605793	2016 UE_{4}	—	August 24, 2011	Haleakala	Pan-STARRS 1	·	1.8 km	MPC · JPL
605794	2016 UO_{4}	—	May 13, 2016	Haleakala	Pan-STARRS 1	·	1.0 km	MPC · JPL
605795	2016 UG_{11}	—	October 1, 2002	Ondřejov	P. Pravec	·	2.3 km	MPC · JPL
605796	2016 UE_{15}	—	November 5, 2002	Kitt Peak	Spacewatch	AGN	1.2 km	MPC · JPL
605797	2016 UX_{16}	—	January 7, 2013	Mount Lemmon	Mount Lemmon Survey	·	1.4 km	MPC · JPL
605798	2016 UB_{19}	—	September 29, 2008	Kitt Peak	Spacewatch	·	1.1 km	MPC · JPL
605799	2016 UF_{19}	—	September 14, 2013	Mount Lemmon	Mount Lemmon Survey	·	630 m	MPC · JPL
605800	2016 UG_{19}	—	September 30, 2003	Kitt Peak	Spacewatch	HNS	1.1 km	MPC · JPL

== 605801–605900 ==
back to top

Designation			Discovery			Properties		Ref
Permanent	Provisional	Named after	Date	Site	Discoverer(s)	Category	Diam.	Ref
605801	2016 UO_{23}	—	October 4, 2016	Mount Lemmon	Mount Lemmon Survey	·	1.6 km	MPC · JPL
605802	2016 UZ_{29}	—	October 8, 2016	Kitt Peak	Spacewatch	·	1.1 km	MPC · JPL
605803	2016 UQ_{30}	—	October 6, 2016	Mount Lemmon	Mount Lemmon Survey	MAR	1.1 km	MPC · JPL
605804	2016 UY_{32}	—	February 14, 2009	Kitt Peak	Spacewatch	·	1.8 km	MPC · JPL
605805	2016 UD_{33}	—	October 19, 2007	Kitt Peak	Spacewatch	·	1.5 km	MPC · JPL
605806	2016 UQ_{33}	—	November 9, 2009	Kitt Peak	Spacewatch	·	810 m	MPC · JPL
605807	2016 UC_{35}	—	November 1, 2006	Kitt Peak	Spacewatch	·	610 m	MPC · JPL
605808	2016 UC_{37}	—	September 3, 2010	Mount Lemmon	Mount Lemmon Survey	·	1.5 km	MPC · JPL
605809	2016 UJ_{41}	—	March 11, 2008	Kitt Peak	Spacewatch	H	340 m	MPC · JPL
605810	2016 UX_{46}	—	July 27, 2015	Cerro Paranal	Altmann, M., Prusti, T.	·	1.9 km	MPC · JPL
605811	2016 UH_{50}	—	September 30, 1995	Kitt Peak	Spacewatch	EOS	1.4 km	MPC · JPL
605812	2016 US_{51}	—	November 17, 2011	Mount Lemmon	Mount Lemmon Survey	·	1.6 km	MPC · JPL
605813	2016 UJ_{53}	—	November 24, 2012	Kitt Peak	Spacewatch	·	1.2 km	MPC · JPL
605814	2016 UX_{56}	—	September 21, 2011	Kitt Peak	Spacewatch	H	400 m	MPC · JPL
605815	2016 UU_{60}	—	October 10, 2007	Mount Lemmon	Mount Lemmon Survey	·	1.7 km	MPC · JPL
605816	2016 UG_{61}	—	December 11, 2012	Mount Lemmon	Mount Lemmon Survey	·	1.3 km	MPC · JPL
605817	2016 UH_{61}	—	September 26, 2016	Haleakala	Pan-STARRS 1	·	1.5 km	MPC · JPL
605818	2016 UA_{63}	—	September 27, 2016	Haleakala	Pan-STARRS 1	·	1.3 km	MPC · JPL
605819	2016 UE_{63}	—	August 24, 2011	Haleakala	Pan-STARRS 1	·	1.7 km	MPC · JPL
605820	2016 UU_{63}	—	January 10, 2014	Mount Lemmon	Mount Lemmon Survey	·	1.2 km	MPC · JPL
605821	2016 UZ_{67}	—	July 12, 2005	Mount Lemmon	Mount Lemmon Survey	·	750 m	MPC · JPL
605822	2016 UG_{68}	—	December 5, 2007	Kitt Peak	Spacewatch	·	1.7 km	MPC · JPL
605823	2016 UE_{71}	—	October 2, 2016	Mount Lemmon	Mount Lemmon Survey	·	1.8 km	MPC · JPL
605824	2016 US_{79}	—	November 7, 2012	Mount Lemmon	Mount Lemmon Survey	(5)	1.3 km	MPC · JPL
605825	2016 UA_{85}	—	October 8, 2007	Kitt Peak	Spacewatch	·	1.4 km	MPC · JPL
605826	2016 UX_{85}	—	October 2, 2006	Mount Lemmon	Mount Lemmon Survey	KOR	1.1 km	MPC · JPL
605827	2016 UR_{89}	—	February 9, 2014	Mount Lemmon	Mount Lemmon Survey	MAS	490 m	MPC · JPL
605828	2016 UD_{91}	—	March 7, 2008	Mount Lemmon	Mount Lemmon Survey	·	1.5 km	MPC · JPL
605829	2016 UG_{91}	—	October 2, 2016	Mount Lemmon	Mount Lemmon Survey	·	1.3 km	MPC · JPL
605830	2016 UP_{91}	—	April 21, 2014	Kitt Peak	Spacewatch	·	2.5 km	MPC · JPL
605831	2016 UD_{92}	—	November 9, 2004	Mauna Kea	Veillet, C.	·	820 m	MPC · JPL
605832	2016 UJ_{93}	—	October 20, 2007	Mount Lemmon	Mount Lemmon Survey	·	1.5 km	MPC · JPL
605833	2016 UV_{93}	—	February 28, 2014	Haleakala	Pan-STARRS 1	·	1.4 km	MPC · JPL
605834	2016 UO_{95}	—	June 7, 2015	Haleakala	Pan-STARRS 1	·	1.4 km	MPC · JPL
605835	2016 UU_{100}	—	July 28, 2003	Palomar	NEAT	BAR	1.8 km	MPC · JPL
605836	2016 UE_{102}	—	October 12, 2007	Kitt Peak	Spacewatch	·	1.2 km	MPC · JPL
605837	2016 UM_{102}	—	September 20, 2011	Haleakala	Pan-STARRS 1	HOF	1.9 km	MPC · JPL
605838	2016 UZ_{109}	—	September 30, 2006	Mount Lemmon	Mount Lemmon Survey	KOR	1.2 km	MPC · JPL
605839	2016 UN_{110}	—	October 2, 2006	Mount Lemmon	Mount Lemmon Survey	·	1.4 km	MPC · JPL
605840	2016 UD_{112}	—	September 11, 2007	Mount Lemmon	Mount Lemmon Survey	·	990 m	MPC · JPL
605841	2016 UV_{113}	—	January 5, 2013	Kitt Peak	Spacewatch	·	1.3 km	MPC · JPL
605842	2016 UX_{113}	—	March 19, 2009	Mount Lemmon	Mount Lemmon Survey	·	1.6 km	MPC · JPL
605843	2016 UF_{119}	—	September 19, 2006	Kitt Peak	Spacewatch	·	1.7 km	MPC · JPL
605844	2016 UM_{119}	—	October 26, 2016	Haleakala	Pan-STARRS 1	AGN	960 m	MPC · JPL
605845	2016 UO_{119}	—	October 2, 2016	Mount Lemmon	Mount Lemmon Survey	·	1.3 km	MPC · JPL
605846	2016 UE_{123}	—	November 7, 2008	Kitt Peak	Spacewatch	·	950 m	MPC · JPL
605847	2016 UF_{123}	—	May 22, 2011	Mount Lemmon	Mount Lemmon Survey	·	820 m	MPC · JPL
605848	2016 UP_{123}	—	November 16, 2011	Mount Lemmon	Mount Lemmon Survey	·	1.6 km	MPC · JPL
605849	2016 UQ_{130}	—	April 11, 2010	Mount Lemmon	Mount Lemmon Survey	·	1.4 km	MPC · JPL
605850	2016 UY_{132}	—	February 10, 2008	Kitt Peak	Spacewatch	·	1.2 km	MPC · JPL
605851	2016 UE_{137}	—	May 4, 2014	Haleakala	Pan-STARRS 1	·	1.7 km	MPC · JPL
605852	2016 US_{139}	—	October 9, 2016	Haleakala	Pan-STARRS 1	·	1.0 km	MPC · JPL
605853	2016 UW_{140}	—	June 13, 2015	Haleakala	Pan-STARRS 1	·	2.0 km	MPC · JPL
605854	2016 UJ_{141}	—	October 1, 2016	Mount Lemmon	Mount Lemmon Survey	GAL	1.2 km	MPC · JPL
605855	2016 UQ_{143}	—	April 27, 2008	Mount Lemmon	Mount Lemmon Survey	MAS	540 m	MPC · JPL
605856	2016 UV_{143}	—	April 2, 2014	Mount Lemmon	Mount Lemmon Survey	·	1.8 km	MPC · JPL
605857	2016 UY_{143}	—	September 30, 2003	Kitt Peak	Spacewatch	(17392)	1.3 km	MPC · JPL
605858	2016 UF_{145}	—	October 20, 2006	Kitt Peak	Spacewatch	KOR	1.2 km	MPC · JPL
605859	2016 UW_{146}	—	October 9, 2016	Mount Lemmon	Mount Lemmon Survey	·	1.2 km	MPC · JPL
605860	2016 UK_{149}	—	August 22, 2004	Kitt Peak	Spacewatch	EOS	1.7 km	MPC · JPL
605861	2016 UO_{149}	—	April 25, 2015	Haleakala	Pan-STARRS 1	MAR	860 m	MPC · JPL
605862	2016 UJ_{150}	—	July 22, 2007	Siding Spring	SSS	EUN	1.5 km	MPC · JPL
605863	2016 UD_{162}	—	April 2, 2009	Kitt Peak	Spacewatch	·	1.3 km	MPC · JPL
605864	2016 US_{172}	—	April 14, 2010	Kitt Peak	Spacewatch	NEM	1.5 km	MPC · JPL
605865	2016 UU_{247}	—	October 24, 2016	Mount Lemmon	Mount Lemmon Survey	·	1.6 km	MPC · JPL
605866	2016 UV_{247}	—	October 28, 2016	Haleakala	Pan-STARRS 1	·	1.5 km	MPC · JPL
605867	2016 VB_{3}	—	January 9, 2007	Mount Lemmon	Mount Lemmon Survey	H	460 m	MPC · JPL
605868	2016 VX_{6}	—	December 13, 2012	Mount Lemmon	Mount Lemmon Survey	·	1.1 km	MPC · JPL
605869	2016 VL_{8}	—	April 21, 2009	Mount Lemmon	Mount Lemmon Survey	·	2.3 km	MPC · JPL
605870	2016 VE_{9}	—	April 24, 2006	Kitt Peak	Spacewatch	·	1.9 km	MPC · JPL
605871	2016 VK_{12}	—	September 7, 2011	Kitt Peak	Spacewatch	AGN	1.0 km	MPC · JPL
605872	2016 VF_{13}	—	April 30, 2014	Haleakala	Pan-STARRS 1	·	1.9 km	MPC · JPL
605873	2016 VS_{14}	—	June 24, 2015	Haleakala	Pan-STARRS 1	·	2.6 km	MPC · JPL
605874	2016 VV_{16}	—	December 23, 2012	Haleakala	Pan-STARRS 1	·	1.7 km	MPC · JPL
605875	2016 VW_{20}	—	July 4, 2014	Haleakala	Pan-STARRS 1	·	2.7 km	MPC · JPL
605876	2016 VR_{21}	—	November 10, 2016	Haleakala	Pan-STARRS 1	·	3.6 km	MPC · JPL
605877	2016 VB_{22}	—	February 13, 2013	ESA OGS	ESA OGS	·	1.4 km	MPC · JPL
605878	2016 VJ_{24}	—	June 29, 2015	Haleakala	Pan-STARRS 1	·	1.8 km	MPC · JPL
605879	2016 VT_{27}	—	November 10, 2016	Haleakala	Pan-STARRS 1	·	1.0 km	MPC · JPL
605880	2016 VO_{39}	—	November 4, 2016	Haleakala	Pan-STARRS 1	·	980 m	MPC · JPL
605881	2016 VY_{46}	—	November 9, 2016	Mount Lemmon	Mount Lemmon Survey	·	2.2 km	MPC · JPL
605882	2016 VN_{51}	—	November 6, 2016	Mount Lemmon	Mount Lemmon Survey	·	2.3 km	MPC · JPL
605883	2016 WS_{12}	—	September 14, 2005	Kitt Peak	Spacewatch	·	730 m	MPC · JPL
605884	2016 WF_{13}	—	March 15, 2008	Kitt Peak	Spacewatch	·	780 m	MPC · JPL
605885	2016 WQ_{15}	—	January 14, 2012	Haleakala	Pan-STARRS 1	·	3.4 km	MPC · JPL
605886	2016 WX_{16}	—	October 26, 2016	Mount Lemmon	Mount Lemmon Survey	·	1.4 km	MPC · JPL
605887	2016 WC_{17}	—	December 1, 2011	Haleakala	Pan-STARRS 1	TEL	1.3 km	MPC · JPL
605888	2016 WR_{18}	—	November 19, 2012	Kitt Peak	Spacewatch	(5)	1.0 km	MPC · JPL
605889	2016 WY_{22}	—	March 21, 2015	Haleakala	Pan-STARRS 1	EUN	1.3 km	MPC · JPL
605890	2016 WS_{25}	—	July 26, 2015	Haleakala	Pan-STARRS 1	EOS	1.7 km	MPC · JPL
605891	2016 WC_{26}	—	August 10, 2015	Haleakala	Pan-STARRS 1	·	1.8 km	MPC · JPL
605892	2016 WY_{26}	—	September 16, 2006	Palomar	NEAT	·	1.8 km	MPC · JPL
605893	2016 WS_{30}	—	January 17, 2007	Mount Lemmon	Mount Lemmon Survey	EOS	1.4 km	MPC · JPL
605894	2016 WS_{31}	—	February 18, 2001	Haleakala	NEAT	·	2.1 km	MPC · JPL
605895	2016 WX_{34}	—	September 5, 2010	Bergisch Gladbach	W. Bickel	·	2.5 km	MPC · JPL
605896	2016 WJ_{40}	—	April 7, 2013	Haleakala	Pan-STARRS 1	EOS	1.9 km	MPC · JPL
605897	2016 WX_{42}	—	November 10, 2016	Mount Lemmon	Mount Lemmon Survey	·	1.9 km	MPC · JPL
605898	2016 WM_{46}	—	December 22, 2012	Haleakala	Pan-STARRS 1	·	1.6 km	MPC · JPL
605899	2016 WY_{50}	—	August 9, 2015	Haleakala	Pan-STARRS 1	·	1.7 km	MPC · JPL
605900	2016 WG_{52}	—	April 4, 2015	Haleakala	Pan-STARRS 1	H	450 m	MPC · JPL

== 605901–606000 ==
back to top

Designation			Discovery			Properties		Ref
Permanent	Provisional	Named after	Date	Site	Discoverer(s)	Category	Diam.	Ref
605901 Montághimre	2000 YM_{33}	Montághimre	December 31, 2000	Piszkéstető	K. Sárneczky, L. Kiss	·	3.0 km	MPC · JPL
605902	2016 WE_{54}	—	October 9, 2002	Palomar	NEAT	·	2.0 km	MPC · JPL
605903	2016 WQ_{54}	—	November 26, 2003	Kitt Peak	Spacewatch	H	470 m	MPC · JPL
605904	2016 WX_{55}	—	October 19, 2006	Kitt Peak	Spacewatch	·	2.1 km	MPC · JPL
605905	2016 WC_{57}	—	April 30, 2014	Haleakala	Pan-STARRS 1	·	1.9 km	MPC · JPL
605906	2016 WK_{62}	—	August 31, 2011	Piszkéstető	K. Sárneczky	·	1.7 km	MPC · JPL
605907	2016 WJ_{64}	—	November 23, 2016	Mount Lemmon	Mount Lemmon Survey	EOS	1.4 km	MPC · JPL
605908	2016 WN_{67}	—	November 30, 2016	Mount Lemmon	Mount Lemmon Survey	HNS	910 m	MPC · JPL
605909	2016 XU	—	November 18, 2007	Mount Lemmon	Mount Lemmon Survey	·	1.7 km	MPC · JPL
605910	2016 XB_{1}	—	November 18, 2011	Mount Lemmon	Mount Lemmon Survey	·	2.4 km	MPC · JPL
605911 Cecily	2016 XD_{1}	Cecily	December 3, 2016	Big Water	D. Rankin	AMO	510 m	MPC · JPL
605912	2016 XA_{4}	—	January 1, 2009	Mount Lemmon	Mount Lemmon Survey	·	2.0 km	MPC · JPL
605913	2016 XX_{6}	—	July 9, 2015	Haleakala	Pan-STARRS 1	·	1.4 km	MPC · JPL
605914	2016 XS_{8}	—	October 28, 2016	Haleakala	Pan-STARRS 1	·	2.2 km	MPC · JPL
605915	2016 XX_{10}	—	August 5, 2008	Siding Spring	SSS	·	1.2 km	MPC · JPL
605916	2016 XD_{13}	—	January 18, 2013	Kitt Peak	Spacewatch	·	1.6 km	MPC · JPL
605917	2016 XU_{13}	—	December 4, 2016	Mount Lemmon	Mount Lemmon Survey	EMA	2.5 km	MPC · JPL
605918	2016 XK_{14}	—	November 19, 2016	Mount Lemmon	Mount Lemmon Survey	EOS	1.6 km	MPC · JPL
605919	2016 XF_{15}	—	December 19, 2003	Kitt Peak	Spacewatch	·	2.3 km	MPC · JPL
605920	2016 XG_{15}	—	March 13, 2012	Mount Lemmon	Mount Lemmon Survey	·	2.1 km	MPC · JPL
605921	2016 XU_{16}	—	March 14, 2007	Mount Lemmon	Mount Lemmon Survey	·	2.8 km	MPC · JPL
605922	2016 XX_{16}	—	September 24, 2009	Catalina	CSS	·	580 m	MPC · JPL
605923	2016 XE_{17}	—	October 29, 2005	Mount Lemmon	Mount Lemmon Survey	TIR	2.5 km	MPC · JPL
605924	2016 XM_{17}	—	August 29, 2011	Siding Spring	SSS	DOR	2.4 km	MPC · JPL
605925	2016 XO_{18}	—	November 1, 2007	Catalina	CSS	·	1.5 km	MPC · JPL
605926	2016 XZ_{21}	—	October 5, 2002	Palomar	NEAT	(18466)	2.3 km	MPC · JPL
605927	2016 XK_{23}	—	September 4, 2010	Mount Lemmon	Mount Lemmon Survey	·	2.1 km	MPC · JPL
605928	2016 XK_{26}	—	December 5, 2016	Mount Lemmon	Mount Lemmon Survey	·	600 m	MPC · JPL
605929	2016 XM_{26}	—	December 5, 2016	Mount Lemmon	Mount Lemmon Survey	·	1.9 km	MPC · JPL
605930	2016 XP_{27}	—	December 4, 2016	Mount Lemmon	Mount Lemmon Survey	·	1.3 km	MPC · JPL
605931	2016 XS_{27}	—	November 4, 2007	Kitt Peak	Spacewatch	·	1.2 km	MPC · JPL
605932	2016 XH_{29}	—	December 4, 2016	Mount Lemmon	Mount Lemmon Survey	(5)	940 m	MPC · JPL
605933	2016 XG_{30}	—	December 4, 2016	Mount Lemmon	Mount Lemmon Survey	·	970 m	MPC · JPL
605934	2016 YM_{8}	—	January 19, 2012	Haleakala	Pan-STARRS 1	H	370 m	MPC · JPL
605935	2016 YR_{10}	—	February 3, 2012	Haleakala	Pan-STARRS 1	H	370 m	MPC · JPL
605936	2016 YT_{13}	—	December 8, 2010	Kitt Peak	Spacewatch	·	2.2 km	MPC · JPL
605937	2016 YO_{14}	—	December 22, 2016	Haleakala	Pan-STARRS 1	·	2.5 km	MPC · JPL
605938	2016 YX_{17}	—	December 24, 2016	Mount Lemmon	Mount Lemmon Survey	·	2.6 km	MPC · JPL
605939	2016 YF_{19}	—	November 30, 2010	Mount Lemmon	Mount Lemmon Survey	·	2.7 km	MPC · JPL
605940	2017 AM_{8}	—	September 26, 2003	Apache Point	SDSS Collaboration	·	3.2 km	MPC · JPL
605941	2017 AT_{11}	—	January 19, 2012	Haleakala	Pan-STARRS 1	·	2.2 km	MPC · JPL
605942	2017 AC_{13}	—	December 22, 2008	Kitt Peak	Spacewatch	H	500 m	MPC · JPL
605943	2017 AM_{15}	—	July 28, 2003	Palomar	NEAT	·	3.9 km	MPC · JPL
605944	2017 AV_{17}	—	January 11, 2008	Kitt Peak	Spacewatch	HOF	2.5 km	MPC · JPL
605945	2017 AL_{23}	—	November 18, 2015	Haleakala	Pan-STARRS 1	·	2.4 km	MPC · JPL
605946	2017 AU_{33}	—	January 4, 2017	Haleakala	Pan-STARRS 1	·	2.2 km	MPC · JPL
605947	2017 AH_{35}	—	January 4, 2017	Haleakala	Pan-STARRS 1	L5	6.4 km	MPC · JPL
605948	2017 AE_{36}	—	January 6, 2013	Kitt Peak	Spacewatch	·	810 m	MPC · JPL
605949	2017 AZ_{38}	—	January 7, 2017	Mount Lemmon	Mount Lemmon Survey	·	1.5 km	MPC · JPL
605950	2017 BY_{1}	—	February 28, 2012	Haleakala	Pan-STARRS 1	EUP	3.5 km	MPC · JPL
605951	2017 BV_{3}	—	February 1, 2006	Kitt Peak	Spacewatch	THM	2.7 km	MPC · JPL
605952	2017 BO_{4}	—	April 2, 2014	Mount Lemmon	Mount Lemmon Survey	·	1.4 km	MPC · JPL
605953	2017 BY_{10}	—	July 25, 2014	Haleakala	Pan-STARRS 1	TIR	2.3 km	MPC · JPL
605954	2017 BS_{18}	—	June 28, 2014	Haleakala	Pan-STARRS 1	·	3.3 km	MPC · JPL
605955	2017 BU_{21}	—	February 14, 2013	Mount Lemmon	Mount Lemmon Survey	·	1.0 km	MPC · JPL
605956	2017 BS_{28}	—	January 13, 2011	Mount Lemmon	Mount Lemmon Survey	·	2.1 km	MPC · JPL
605957	2017 BX_{29}	—	November 6, 2016	Mount Lemmon	Mount Lemmon Survey	H	590 m	MPC · JPL
605958	2017 BH_{35}	—	March 1, 2012	Catalina	CSS	·	3.2 km	MPC · JPL
605959	2017 BU_{38}	—	April 5, 2003	Kitt Peak	Spacewatch	·	1.3 km	MPC · JPL
605960	2017 BE_{44}	—	December 6, 2016	Mount Lemmon	Mount Lemmon Survey	H	470 m	MPC · JPL
605961	2017 BR_{50}	—	June 27, 2015	Haleakala	Pan-STARRS 1	H	450 m	MPC · JPL
605962	2017 BH_{55}	—	June 30, 2008	Kitt Peak	Spacewatch	·	5.0 km	MPC · JPL
605963	2017 BF_{65}	—	November 15, 2010	Catalina	CSS	·	2.4 km	MPC · JPL
605964	2017 BY_{69}	—	January 20, 2009	Catalina	CSS	H	510 m	MPC · JPL
605965	2017 BU_{70}	—	December 2, 2010	Mount Lemmon	Mount Lemmon Survey	·	2.3 km	MPC · JPL
605966	2017 BO_{74}	—	August 27, 2009	Kitt Peak	Spacewatch	·	1.9 km	MPC · JPL
605967	2017 BZ_{77}	—	July 28, 2009	Kitt Peak	Spacewatch	·	2.3 km	MPC · JPL
605968	2017 BF_{83}	—	July 27, 2014	Haleakala	Pan-STARRS 1	·	1.1 km	MPC · JPL
605969	2017 BO_{84}	—	September 4, 2014	Haleakala	Pan-STARRS 1	ARM	4.0 km	MPC · JPL
605970	2017 BA_{85}	—	September 17, 2003	Kitt Peak	Spacewatch	·	3.8 km	MPC · JPL
605971	2017 BQ_{86}	—	December 30, 2005	Kitt Peak	Spacewatch	EOS	1.8 km	MPC · JPL
605972	2017 BL_{91}	—	November 27, 2013	Haleakala	Pan-STARRS 1	H	370 m	MPC · JPL
605973	2017 BE_{95}	—	January 3, 2012	Kitt Peak	Spacewatch	·	1.8 km	MPC · JPL
605974	2017 BH_{102}	—	February 2, 2006	Mount Lemmon	Mount Lemmon Survey	·	2.4 km	MPC · JPL
605975	2017 BO_{104}	—	February 13, 2012	Haleakala	Pan-STARRS 1	·	2.4 km	MPC · JPL
605976	2017 BP_{108}	—	November 1, 2015	Mount Lemmon	Mount Lemmon Survey	·	2.1 km	MPC · JPL
605977	2017 BA_{111}	—	June 25, 2014	Mount Lemmon	Mount Lemmon Survey	·	3.2 km	MPC · JPL
605978	2017 BG_{115}	—	April 24, 2001	Kitt Peak	Spacewatch	·	3.6 km	MPC · JPL
605979	2017 BX_{115}	—	November 5, 2010	Mount Lemmon	Mount Lemmon Survey	·	3.2 km	MPC · JPL
605980	2017 BY_{125}	—	October 29, 2010	Mount Lemmon	Mount Lemmon Survey	·	1.7 km	MPC · JPL
605981	2017 BT_{130}	—	August 27, 2014	Haleakala	Pan-STARRS 1	·	3.5 km	MPC · JPL
605982	2017 BJ_{131}	—	March 29, 2012	Mount Lemmon	Mount Lemmon Survey	VER	2.2 km	MPC · JPL
605983	2017 BF_{132}	—	February 25, 2011	Mount Lemmon	Mount Lemmon Survey	·	3.2 km	MPC · JPL
605984	2017 BS_{132}	—	September 8, 2015	Haleakala	Pan-STARRS 1	ADE	1.4 km	MPC · JPL
605985	2017 BA_{133}	—	February 27, 2012	Haleakala	Pan-STARRS 1	·	2.5 km	MPC · JPL
605986	2017 BP_{137}	—	October 24, 2009	Kitt Peak	Spacewatch	·	2.3 km	MPC · JPL
605987	2017 BT_{139}	—	March 21, 2012	Mount Lemmon	Mount Lemmon Survey	·	1.6 km	MPC · JPL
605988	2017 BL_{142}	—	January 29, 2017	Mount Lemmon	Mount Lemmon Survey	H	330 m	MPC · JPL
605989	2017 BH_{150}	—	January 28, 2017	Haleakala	Pan-STARRS 1	H	310 m	MPC · JPL
605990	2017 BZ_{156}	—	January 27, 2017	Haleakala	Pan-STARRS 1	·	2.2 km	MPC · JPL
605991	2017 BP_{160}	—	May 19, 2010	Mount Lemmon	Mount Lemmon Survey	3:2 · SHU	4.8 km	MPC · JPL
605992	2017 BK_{165}	—	December 14, 2015	Haleakala	Pan-STARRS 1	·	1.7 km	MPC · JPL
605993	2017 BZ_{167}	—	January 30, 2017	Haleakala	Pan-STARRS 1	·	2.4 km	MPC · JPL
605994	2017 BC_{171}	—	January 28, 2017	Haleakala	Pan-STARRS 1	L5	7.8 km	MPC · JPL
605995	2017 CQ_{2}	—	July 23, 2015	Haleakala	Pan-STARRS 1	·	2.2 km	MPC · JPL
605996	2017 CH_{3}	—	June 27, 2014	Haleakala	Pan-STARRS 1	·	3.3 km	MPC · JPL
605997	2017 CW_{3}	—	November 5, 2010	Mount Lemmon	Mount Lemmon Survey	·	3.3 km	MPC · JPL
605998	2017 CC_{18}	—	January 26, 2012	Haleakala	Pan-STARRS 1	·	1.9 km	MPC · JPL
605999	2017 CT_{20}	—	February 15, 2010	Kitt Peak	Spacewatch	·	630 m	MPC · JPL
606000	2017 CC_{23}	—	March 25, 2012	Mount Lemmon	Mount Lemmon Survey	EOS	1.6 km	MPC · JPL

back to top

== Meaning of names ==
As minor planet discoveries are confirmed, they are given a permanent number by the IAU's Minor Planet Center (MPC), and the discoverers can then submit names for them, following the IAU's naming conventions. The list below concerns those minor planets in the specified number-range that have received names, and explains the meanings of those names.

Official naming citations of newly named small Solar System bodies are approved and published in a bulletin by IAU's Working Group for Small Bodies Nomenclature (WGSBN). Before May 2021, citations were published in MPC's Minor Planet Circulars for many decades. Recent citations can also be found on the JPL Small-Body Database (SBDB). Until his death in 2016, German astronomer Lutz D. Schmadel compiled these citations into the Dictionary of Minor Planet Names (DMP) and regularly updated the collection.

Based on Paul Herget's The Names of the Minor Planets, Schmadel also researched the unclear origin of numerous asteroids, most of which had been named prior to World War II. This article incorporates text from this source, which is in the public domain: SBDB New namings may only be added to this list below after official publication as the preannouncement of names is condemned. The WGSBN publishes a comprehensive guideline for the naming rules of non-cometary small Solar System bodies.

Named minor planet	Provisional	This minor planet was named for...	Ref · Catalog
605499 Krupko	2016 NT_{42}	Vladimir Krupko (born 1958), Siberian astronomer, one of the founders of the Omsk planetarium, and its director.	IAU · 605499
605901 Montághimre	2016 WD_{53}	Imre Montágh (1935–1986), a Hungarian remedial therapist, speech therapist, teacher, popular TV and radio personality and author of several books.	IAU · 605901
605911 Cecily	2016 XD_{1}	Cecily Rankin (born 1987), wife of American amateur astronomer David Rankin, who discovered this Amor asteroid and near-Earth object. She holds a B.S. in advanced radiologic sciences.	IAU · 605911
