= List of minor planets: 251001–252000 =

The following is a partial list of minor planets, running from minor-planet number 251001 through 252000, inclusive. The primary data for this and other partial lists is based on JPL's "Small-Body Orbital Elements" and data available from the Minor Planet Center. Critical list information is also provided by the MPC, unless otherwise specified from Lowell Observatory. A detailed description of the table's columns and additional sources are given on the main page including a complete list of every page in this series, and a statistical break-up on the dynamical classification of minor planets.

Also see the summary list of all named bodies in numerical and alphabetical order, and the corresponding naming citations for the number range of this particular list. New namings may only be added to this list after official publication, as the preannouncement of names is condemned by the Working Group for Small Bodies Nomenclature of the International Astronomical Union.

Near-Earth obj.	MBA (inner)	MBA (outer)	Centaur
Mars-crosser	MBA (middle)	Jupiter trojan	Trans-Neptunian obj.
Unclassified

== 251001–251100 ==
Designation			Discovery			Properties		Ref
Permanent	Provisional	Named after	Date	Site	Discoverer(s)	Category	Diam.	Ref
251001 Sluch	2006 OM_{14}	Sluch	July 28, 2006	Andrushivka	Andrushivka	·	3.0 km	MPC · JPL
251002	2006 OP_{21}	—	July 21, 2006	Mount Lemmon	Mount Lemmon Survey	·	1.5 km	MPC · JPL
251003	2006 PB	—	August 1, 2006	Pla D'Arguines	R. Ferrando	·	1.8 km	MPC · JPL
251004	2006 PO_{3}	—	August 12, 2006	Palomar	NEAT	·	1.4 km	MPC · JPL
251005	2006 PP_{4}	—	August 13, 2006	Palomar	NEAT	NYS	1.8 km	MPC · JPL
251006	2006 PO_{12}	—	August 13, 2006	Palomar	NEAT	·	1.9 km	MPC · JPL
251007	2006 PX_{15}	—	August 15, 2006	Palomar	NEAT	·	1.5 km	MPC · JPL
251008	2006 PN_{25}	—	August 13, 2006	Palomar	NEAT	·	1.9 km	MPC · JPL
251009	2006 PF_{29}	—	August 12, 2006	Palomar	NEAT	·	1.7 km	MPC · JPL
251010	2006 PU_{31}	—	August 14, 2006	Siding Spring	SSS	·	2.2 km	MPC · JPL
251011	2006 PP_{32}	—	August 15, 2006	Palomar	NEAT	·	3.8 km	MPC · JPL
251012	2006 PE_{38}	—	August 14, 2006	Palomar	NEAT	·	1.7 km	MPC · JPL
251013	2006 PF_{41}	—	August 14, 2006	Palomar	NEAT	·	1.3 km	MPC · JPL
251014 Bejczyantal	2006 QR_{4}	Bejczyantal	August 18, 2006	Piszkéstető	K. Sárneczky, Kuli, Z.	NYS	1.6 km	MPC · JPL
251015 Gregusspál	2006 QA_{6}	Gregusspál	August 19, 2006	Piszkéstető	K. Sárneczky, Kuli, Z.	·	3.9 km	MPC · JPL
251016	2006 QA_{30}	—	August 19, 2006	Palomar	NEAT	NYS	1.6 km	MPC · JPL
251017	2006 QJ_{30}	—	August 20, 2006	Palomar	NEAT	NYS	1.6 km	MPC · JPL
251018 Liubirena	2006 QC_{31}	Liubirena	August 16, 2006	Andrushivka	Andrushivka	NYS	1.6 km	MPC · JPL
251019	2006 QV_{31}	—	August 18, 2006	Socorro	LINEAR	·	1.4 km	MPC · JPL
251020	2006 QV_{34}	—	August 17, 2006	Palomar	NEAT	·	1.7 km	MPC · JPL
251021	2006 QQ_{36}	—	August 16, 2006	Siding Spring	SSS	·	1.7 km	MPC · JPL
251022	2006 QN_{39}	—	August 19, 2006	Anderson Mesa	LONEOS	(1547)	2.6 km	MPC · JPL
251023	2006 QE_{46}	—	August 20, 2006	Palomar	NEAT	NYS	1.2 km	MPC · JPL
251024	2006 QE_{51}	—	August 23, 2006	Palomar	NEAT	V	970 m	MPC · JPL
251025	2006 QC_{60}	—	August 20, 2006	Palomar	NEAT	NYS	1.4 km	MPC · JPL
251026	2006 QG_{60}	—	August 20, 2006	Palomar	NEAT	MAS	1.3 km	MPC · JPL
251027	2006 QH_{61}	—	August 21, 2006	Socorro	LINEAR	(5)	1.8 km	MPC · JPL
251028	2006 QO_{79}	—	August 24, 2006	Socorro	LINEAR	·	1.5 km	MPC · JPL
251029	2006 QH_{94}	—	August 16, 2006	Palomar	NEAT	·	1.4 km	MPC · JPL
251030	2006 QV_{96}	—	August 16, 2006	Palomar	NEAT	·	3.2 km	MPC · JPL
251031	2006 QB_{97}	—	August 19, 2006	Palomar	NEAT	NYS	1.7 km	MPC · JPL
251032	2006 QU_{100}	—	August 25, 2006	Socorro	LINEAR	·	2.1 km	MPC · JPL
251033	2006 QY_{123}	—	August 29, 2006	Catalina	CSS	·	2.0 km	MPC · JPL
251034	2006 QY_{126}	—	August 16, 2006	Palomar	NEAT	·	2.4 km	MPC · JPL
251035	2006 QS_{138}	—	August 16, 2006	Palomar	NEAT	·	1.6 km	MPC · JPL
251036	2006 QC_{139}	—	August 17, 2006	Palomar	NEAT	·	1.6 km	MPC · JPL
251037	2006 QX_{139}	—	August 18, 2006	Palomar	NEAT	·	1.3 km	MPC · JPL
251038	2006 QK_{166}	—	August 29, 2006	Anderson Mesa	LONEOS	·	2.3 km	MPC · JPL
251039	2006 QX_{166}	—	August 29, 2006	Catalina	CSS	·	2.4 km	MPC · JPL
251040	2006 RN_{3}	—	September 11, 2006	Catalina	CSS	·	1.0 km	MPC · JPL
251041	2006 RM_{15}	—	September 14, 2006	Palomar	NEAT	(5)	1.4 km	MPC · JPL
251042	2006 RY_{16}	—	September 14, 2006	Palomar	NEAT	·	2.2 km	MPC · JPL
251043	2006 RS_{17}	—	September 14, 2006	Palomar	NEAT	·	1.9 km	MPC · JPL
251044	2006 RY_{18}	—	September 14, 2006	Palomar	NEAT	·	3.4 km	MPC · JPL
251045	2006 RC_{21}	—	September 15, 2006	Kitt Peak	Spacewatch	·	1.8 km	MPC · JPL
251046	2006 RT_{44}	—	September 14, 2006	Kitt Peak	Spacewatch	·	1.9 km	MPC · JPL
251047	2006 RO_{52}	—	September 14, 2006	Kitt Peak	Spacewatch	·	1.7 km	MPC · JPL
251048	2006 RB_{54}	—	September 14, 2006	Kitt Peak	Spacewatch	·	3.2 km	MPC · JPL
251049	2006 RL_{55}	—	September 14, 2006	Kitt Peak	Spacewatch	MAR	1.8 km	MPC · JPL
251050	2006 RM_{58}	—	September 15, 2006	Kitt Peak	Spacewatch	·	1.8 km	MPC · JPL
251051	2006 RZ_{59}	—	September 15, 2006	Kitt Peak	Spacewatch	·	1.4 km	MPC · JPL
251052	2006 RV_{60}	—	September 14, 2006	Palomar	NEAT	·	4.0 km	MPC · JPL
251053	2006 RM_{62}	—	September 12, 2006	Catalina	CSS	·	1.5 km	MPC · JPL
251054	2006 RV_{74}	—	September 15, 2006	Kitt Peak	Spacewatch	·	1.7 km	MPC · JPL
251055	2006 RH_{87}	—	September 15, 2006	Kitt Peak	Spacewatch	·	1.6 km	MPC · JPL
251056	2006 RJ_{94}	—	September 15, 2006	Kitt Peak	Spacewatch	·	2.2 km	MPC · JPL
251057	2006 RD_{95}	—	September 15, 2006	Kitt Peak	Spacewatch	·	1.9 km	MPC · JPL
251058	2006 SU	—	September 16, 2006	Goodricke-Pigott	R. A. Tucker	EUN	1.8 km	MPC · JPL
251059	2006 SP_{4}	—	September 16, 2006	Catalina	CSS	·	2.6 km	MPC · JPL
251060	2006 SU_{5}	—	September 16, 2006	Anderson Mesa	LONEOS	·	3.2 km	MPC · JPL
251061	2006 SJ_{14}	—	September 17, 2006	Catalina	CSS	·	1.3 km	MPC · JPL
251062	2006 SK_{18}	—	September 17, 2006	Kitt Peak	Spacewatch	·	2.8 km	MPC · JPL
251063	2006 ST_{22}	—	September 17, 2006	Anderson Mesa	LONEOS	·	1.9 km	MPC · JPL
251064	2006 SK_{23}	—	September 17, 2006	Anderson Mesa	LONEOS	·	4.0 km	MPC · JPL
251065	2006 SW_{25}	—	September 16, 2006	Catalina	CSS	·	2.8 km	MPC · JPL
251066	2006 SG_{26}	—	September 16, 2006	Catalina	CSS	·	2.6 km	MPC · JPL
251067	2006 ST_{34}	—	September 17, 2006	Catalina	CSS	(5)	1.3 km	MPC · JPL
251068	2006 SN_{35}	—	September 17, 2006	Kitt Peak	Spacewatch	·	1.3 km	MPC · JPL
251069	2006 SB_{37}	—	September 17, 2006	Kitt Peak	Spacewatch	·	1.4 km	MPC · JPL
251070	2006 SV_{40}	—	September 18, 2006	Catalina	CSS	·	1.5 km	MPC · JPL
251071	2006 SH_{46}	—	September 18, 2006	Kitt Peak	Spacewatch	(5)	1.7 km	MPC · JPL
251072	2006 SU_{48}	—	September 17, 2006	Anderson Mesa	LONEOS	·	2.4 km	MPC · JPL
251073	2006 SM_{57}	—	September 19, 2006	Charleston	Astronomical Research Observatory	·	2.6 km	MPC · JPL
251074	2006 SN_{57}	—	September 19, 2006	Kitt Peak	Spacewatch	·	2.5 km	MPC · JPL
251075	2006 SP_{71}	—	September 19, 2006	Kitt Peak	Spacewatch	EUN	1.4 km	MPC · JPL
251076	2006 SH_{76}	—	September 19, 2006	Kitt Peak	Spacewatch	·	2.4 km	MPC · JPL
251077	2006 SX_{78}	—	September 16, 2006	Catalina	CSS	·	2.1 km	MPC · JPL
251078	2006 SL_{79}	—	September 17, 2006	Catalina	CSS	·	2.7 km	MPC · JPL
251079	2006 SC_{81}	—	September 18, 2006	Kitt Peak	Spacewatch	·	1.7 km	MPC · JPL
251080	2006 ST_{85}	—	September 18, 2006	Kitt Peak	Spacewatch	·	1.5 km	MPC · JPL
251081	2006 SZ_{90}	—	September 18, 2006	Kitt Peak	Spacewatch	·	1.5 km	MPC · JPL
251082	2006 SW_{93}	—	September 18, 2006	Kitt Peak	Spacewatch	·	2.5 km	MPC · JPL
251083	2006 SM_{104}	—	September 19, 2006	Kitt Peak	Spacewatch	·	1.4 km	MPC · JPL
251084	2006 SR_{105}	—	September 19, 2006	Kitt Peak	Spacewatch	·	2.6 km	MPC · JPL
251085	2006 SY_{108}	—	September 19, 2006	Kitt Peak	Spacewatch	·	1.7 km	MPC · JPL
251086	2006 SE_{113}	—	September 23, 2006	Kitt Peak	Spacewatch	·	1.6 km	MPC · JPL
251087	2006 SS_{123}	—	September 19, 2006	Anderson Mesa	LONEOS	(5)	1.6 km	MPC · JPL
251088	2006 SM_{126}	—	September 21, 2006	Anderson Mesa	LONEOS	EOS	2.7 km	MPC · JPL
251089	2006 SR_{139}	—	September 22, 2006	Socorro	LINEAR	·	2.4 km	MPC · JPL
251090	2006 SM_{144}	—	September 19, 2006	Kitt Peak	Spacewatch	·	1.8 km	MPC · JPL
251091	2006 SY_{171}	—	September 25, 2006	Kitt Peak	Spacewatch	·	1.3 km	MPC · JPL
251092	2006 SW_{197}	—	September 27, 2006	La Sagra	OAM	·	3.0 km	MPC · JPL
251093	2006 SE_{200}	—	September 24, 2006	Kitt Peak	Spacewatch	·	3.3 km	MPC · JPL
251094	2006 SC_{201}	—	September 24, 2006	Kitt Peak	Spacewatch	·	2.0 km	MPC · JPL
251095	2006 SK_{211}	—	September 26, 2006	Catalina	CSS	·	1.8 km	MPC · JPL
251096	2006 SO_{223}	—	September 25, 2006	Kitt Peak	Spacewatch	·	2.1 km	MPC · JPL
251097	2006 SC_{224}	—	September 25, 2006	Mount Lemmon	Mount Lemmon Survey	(5)	1.4 km	MPC · JPL
251098	2006 SE_{256}	—	September 26, 2006	Kitt Peak	Spacewatch	·	2.2 km	MPC · JPL
251099	2006 SF_{268}	—	September 26, 2006	Kitt Peak	Spacewatch	·	2.4 km	MPC · JPL
251100	2006 SU_{269}	—	September 26, 2006	Mount Lemmon	Mount Lemmon Survey	(194)	2.0 km	MPC · JPL

== 251101–251200 ==
back to top

Designation			Discovery			Properties		Ref
Permanent	Provisional	Named after	Date	Site	Discoverer(s)	Category	Diam.	Ref
251101	2006 SQ_{280}	—	September 29, 2006	Anderson Mesa	LONEOS	WIT	1.4 km	MPC · JPL
251102	2006 SZ_{280}	—	September 29, 2006	Anderson Mesa	LONEOS	·	2.2 km	MPC · JPL
251103	2006 SO_{282}	—	September 25, 2006	Socorro	LINEAR	·	2.0 km	MPC · JPL
251104	2006 SN_{283}	—	September 26, 2006	Socorro	LINEAR	·	3.1 km	MPC · JPL
251105	2006 SJ_{284}	—	September 27, 2006	Catalina	CSS	·	1.8 km	MPC · JPL
251106	2006 SW_{290}	—	September 25, 2006	Kitt Peak	Spacewatch	·	1.5 km	MPC · JPL
251107	2006 SA_{295}	—	September 25, 2006	Kitt Peak	Spacewatch	·	1.4 km	MPC · JPL
251108	2006 SJ_{295}	—	September 25, 2006	Kitt Peak	Spacewatch	·	2.0 km	MPC · JPL
251109	2006 SN_{296}	—	September 25, 2006	Kitt Peak	Spacewatch	·	1.1 km	MPC · JPL
251110	2006 SL_{297}	—	September 25, 2006	Mount Lemmon	Mount Lemmon Survey	·	1.1 km	MPC · JPL
251111	2006 SM_{309}	—	September 27, 2006	Kitt Peak	Spacewatch	·	2.6 km	MPC · JPL
251112	2006 SP_{322}	—	September 27, 2006	Kitt Peak	Spacewatch	·	1.9 km	MPC · JPL
251113	2006 SX_{331}	—	September 28, 2006	Mount Lemmon	Mount Lemmon Survey	·	1.9 km	MPC · JPL
251114	2006 SO_{332}	—	September 28, 2006	Mount Lemmon	Mount Lemmon Survey	·	1.6 km	MPC · JPL
251115	2006 SW_{332}	—	September 28, 2006	Kitt Peak	Spacewatch	·	1.1 km	MPC · JPL
251116	2006 SK_{336}	—	September 28, 2006	Kitt Peak	Spacewatch	·	2.4 km	MPC · JPL
251117	2006 SB_{354}	—	September 30, 2006	Catalina	CSS	·	1.4 km	MPC · JPL
251118	2006 SB_{356}	—	September 30, 2006	Catalina	CSS	MAR	1.4 km	MPC · JPL
251119	2006 SD_{356}	—	September 30, 2006	Catalina	CSS	·	5.1 km	MPC · JPL
251120	2006 SH_{357}	—	September 30, 2006	Catalina	CSS	·	1.8 km	MPC · JPL
251121	2006 SM_{359}	—	September 30, 2006	Catalina	CSS	·	2.4 km	MPC · JPL
251122	2006 SE_{360}	—	September 30, 2006	Kitt Peak	Spacewatch	·	2.3 km	MPC · JPL
251123	2006 SD_{363}	—	September 30, 2006	Catalina	CSS	·	2.1 km	MPC · JPL
251124	2006 SO_{364}	—	September 28, 2006	Mount Lemmon	Mount Lemmon Survey	·	3.0 km	MPC · JPL
251125	2006 SM_{375}	—	September 17, 2006	Apache Point	A. C. Becker	ADE	3.8 km	MPC · JPL
251126	2006 SC_{393}	—	September 28, 2006	Catalina	CSS	·	2.6 km	MPC · JPL
251127	2006 SB_{398}	—	September 27, 2006	Mount Lemmon	Mount Lemmon Survey	·	2.1 km	MPC · JPL
251128	2006 SE_{400}	—	September 19, 2006	Kitt Peak	Spacewatch	·	2.2 km	MPC · JPL
251129	2006 SW_{413}	—	September 25, 2006	Catalina	CSS	·	2.5 km	MPC · JPL
251130	2006 TQ	—	October 1, 2006	Lulin	Lin, C.-S., Q. Ye	·	2.8 km	MPC · JPL
251131	2006 TA_{4}	—	October 2, 2006	Mount Lemmon	Mount Lemmon Survey	·	1.4 km	MPC · JPL
251132	2006 TG_{20}	—	October 11, 2006	Kitt Peak	Spacewatch	·	1.7 km	MPC · JPL
251133	2006 TJ_{20}	—	October 11, 2006	Kitt Peak	Spacewatch	·	2.9 km	MPC · JPL
251134	2006 TV_{21}	—	October 11, 2006	Kitt Peak	Spacewatch	·	1.4 km	MPC · JPL
251135	2006 TC_{25}	—	October 12, 2006	Kitt Peak	Spacewatch	·	2.5 km	MPC · JPL
251136	2006 TO_{34}	—	October 12, 2006	Kitt Peak	Spacewatch	·	2.0 km	MPC · JPL
251137	2006 TO_{37}	—	October 12, 2006	Kitt Peak	Spacewatch	·	3.9 km	MPC · JPL
251138	2006 TV_{37}	—	October 12, 2006	Kitt Peak	Spacewatch	·	2.6 km	MPC · JPL
251139	2006 TZ_{37}	—	October 12, 2006	Kitt Peak	Spacewatch	·	2.0 km	MPC · JPL
251140	2006 TK_{45}	—	October 12, 2006	Kitt Peak	Spacewatch	(5)	2.3 km	MPC · JPL
251141	2006 TN_{45}	—	October 12, 2006	Kitt Peak	Spacewatch	·	2.5 km	MPC · JPL
251142	2006 TB_{46}	—	October 12, 2006	Kitt Peak	Spacewatch	·	3.5 km	MPC · JPL
251143	2006 TR_{46}	—	October 12, 2006	Kitt Peak	Spacewatch	PAD	3.0 km	MPC · JPL
251144	2006 TZ_{46}	—	October 12, 2006	Kitt Peak	Spacewatch	·	2.1 km	MPC · JPL
251145	2006 TV_{48}	—	October 12, 2006	Kitt Peak	Spacewatch	·	2.6 km	MPC · JPL
251146	2006 TO_{49}	—	October 12, 2006	Palomar	NEAT	·	2.0 km	MPC · JPL
251147	2006 TZ_{51}	—	October 12, 2006	Kitt Peak	Spacewatch	·	2.8 km	MPC · JPL
251148	2006 TL_{56}	—	October 13, 2006	Kitt Peak	Spacewatch	·	2.2 km	MPC · JPL
251149	2006 TS_{56}	—	October 14, 2006	Charleston	Astronomical Research Observatory	·	2.0 km	MPC · JPL
251150	2006 TQ_{64}	—	October 11, 2006	Kitt Peak	Spacewatch	·	2.0 km	MPC · JPL
251151	2006 TS_{72}	—	October 11, 2006	Palomar	NEAT	·	2.3 km	MPC · JPL
251152	2006 TY_{72}	—	October 11, 2006	Palomar	NEAT	·	1.9 km	MPC · JPL
251153	2006 TR_{73}	—	October 11, 2006	Kitt Peak	Spacewatch	·	1.7 km	MPC · JPL
251154	2006 TX_{73}	—	October 11, 2006	Palomar	NEAT	·	1.6 km	MPC · JPL
251155	2006 TG_{74}	—	October 11, 2006	Palomar	NEAT	·	2.4 km	MPC · JPL
251156	2006 TU_{74}	—	October 11, 2006	Palomar	NEAT	·	1.8 km	MPC · JPL
251157	2006 TN_{75}	—	October 11, 2006	Palomar	NEAT	·	1.4 km	MPC · JPL
251158	2006 TK_{78}	—	October 12, 2006	Palomar	NEAT	·	1.7 km	MPC · JPL
251159	2006 TA_{81}	—	October 13, 2006	Kitt Peak	Spacewatch	EUN	2.9 km	MPC · JPL
251160	2006 TG_{82}	—	October 13, 2006	Kitt Peak	Spacewatch	·	3.4 km	MPC · JPL
251161	2006 TY_{82}	—	October 13, 2006	Kitt Peak	Spacewatch	WIT	1.2 km	MPC · JPL
251162	2006 TM_{83}	—	October 13, 2006	Kitt Peak	Spacewatch	·	2.5 km	MPC · JPL
251163	2006 TY_{87}	—	October 13, 2006	Kitt Peak	Spacewatch	HOF	3.3 km	MPC · JPL
251164	2006 TJ_{97}	—	October 13, 2006	Kitt Peak	Spacewatch	HOF	3.1 km	MPC · JPL
251165	2006 TB_{106}	—	October 14, 2006	Lulin	Lin, C.-S., Q. Ye	JUN	1.6 km	MPC · JPL
251166	2006 TW_{108}	—	October 2, 2006	Mount Lemmon	Mount Lemmon Survey	MIS	3.6 km	MPC · JPL
251167	2006 TJ_{113}	—	October 1, 2006	Apache Point	A. C. Becker	·	2.3 km	MPC · JPL
251168	2006 TO_{121}	—	October 13, 2006	Kitt Peak	Spacewatch	DOR	3.2 km	MPC · JPL
251169	2006 UF_{2}	—	October 16, 2006	Bergisch Gladbach	W. Bickel	·	2.6 km	MPC · JPL
251170	2006 UE_{3}	—	October 16, 2006	Goodricke-Pigott	R. A. Tucker	·	2.5 km	MPC · JPL
251171	2006 UM_{6}	—	October 16, 2006	Catalina	CSS	·	1.9 km	MPC · JPL
251172	2006 UM_{8}	—	October 16, 2006	Catalina	CSS	·	3.4 km	MPC · JPL
251173	2006 UO_{12}	—	October 17, 2006	Mount Lemmon	Mount Lemmon Survey	·	2.3 km	MPC · JPL
251174	2006 UB_{13}	—	October 17, 2006	Mount Lemmon	Mount Lemmon Survey	·	1.9 km	MPC · JPL
251175	2006 UM_{16}	—	October 17, 2006	Mount Lemmon	Mount Lemmon Survey	·	2.0 km	MPC · JPL
251176	2006 UB_{24}	—	October 16, 2006	Kitt Peak	Spacewatch	·	1.7 km	MPC · JPL
251177	2006 UH_{26}	—	October 16, 2006	Kitt Peak	Spacewatch	NEM	2.7 km	MPC · JPL
251178	2006 UE_{32}	—	October 16, 2006	Kitt Peak	Spacewatch	·	2.1 km	MPC · JPL
251179	2006 UT_{32}	—	October 16, 2006	Kitt Peak	Spacewatch	MIS	2.5 km	MPC · JPL
251180	2006 UZ_{37}	—	October 16, 2006	Kitt Peak	Spacewatch	·	2.0 km	MPC · JPL
251181	2006 UX_{58}	—	October 19, 2006	Catalina	CSS	JUN	1.2 km	MPC · JPL
251182	2006 UR_{60}	—	October 19, 2006	Socorro	LINEAR	·	2.1 km	MPC · JPL
251183	2006 UP_{61}	—	October 19, 2006	Catalina	CSS	EUN	3.3 km	MPC · JPL
251184	2006 UY_{70}	—	October 16, 2006	Catalina	CSS	·	3.6 km	MPC · JPL
251185	2006 UM_{77}	—	October 17, 2006	Kitt Peak	Spacewatch	·	2.8 km	MPC · JPL
251186	2006 UQ_{79}	—	October 17, 2006	Kitt Peak	Spacewatch	NEM	3.1 km	MPC · JPL
251187	2006 UR_{80}	—	October 17, 2006	Mount Lemmon	Mount Lemmon Survey	·	1.9 km	MPC · JPL
251188	2006 UJ_{84}	—	October 17, 2006	Mount Lemmon	Mount Lemmon Survey	·	2.4 km	MPC · JPL
251189	2006 UA_{88}	—	October 17, 2006	Kitt Peak	Spacewatch	·	2.8 km	MPC · JPL
251190	2006 UF_{90}	—	October 17, 2006	Kitt Peak	Spacewatch	·	2.8 km	MPC · JPL
251191	2006 UK_{90}	—	October 17, 2006	Kitt Peak	Spacewatch	AGN	1.4 km	MPC · JPL
251192	2006 UT_{105}	—	October 18, 2006	Kitt Peak	Spacewatch	·	1.4 km	MPC · JPL
251193	2006 UO_{107}	—	October 18, 2006	Kitt Peak	Spacewatch	·	1.6 km	MPC · JPL
251194	2006 UB_{118}	—	October 19, 2006	Kitt Peak	Spacewatch	·	2.8 km	MPC · JPL
251195	2006 UH_{119}	—	October 19, 2006	Kitt Peak	Spacewatch	·	1.4 km	MPC · JPL
251196	2006 UY_{122}	—	October 19, 2006	Kitt Peak	Spacewatch	·	1.4 km	MPC · JPL
251197	2006 UR_{125}	—	October 19, 2006	Kitt Peak	Spacewatch	JUN	1.6 km	MPC · JPL
251198	2006 UM_{128}	—	October 19, 2006	Kitt Peak	Spacewatch	·	2.2 km	MPC · JPL
251199	2006 UT_{129}	—	October 19, 2006	Kitt Peak	Spacewatch	·	2.9 km	MPC · JPL
251200	2006 UZ_{139}	—	October 19, 2006	Kitt Peak	Spacewatch	·	4.2 km	MPC · JPL

== 251201–251300 ==
back to top

Designation			Discovery			Properties		Ref
Permanent	Provisional	Named after	Date	Site	Discoverer(s)	Category	Diam.	Ref
251201	2006 UT_{149}	—	October 20, 2006	Catalina	CSS	·	2.1 km	MPC · JPL
251202	2006 UW_{154}	—	October 21, 2006	Kitt Peak	Spacewatch	·	2.2 km	MPC · JPL
251203	2006 UT_{157}	—	October 21, 2006	Mount Lemmon	Mount Lemmon Survey	·	1.7 km	MPC · JPL
251204	2006 UP_{164}	—	October 21, 2006	Mount Lemmon	Mount Lemmon Survey	·	2.2 km	MPC · JPL
251205	2006 UX_{164}	—	October 21, 2006	Mount Lemmon	Mount Lemmon Survey	·	2.9 km	MPC · JPL
251206	2006 UT_{174}	—	October 22, 2006	Catalina	CSS	·	3.3 km	MPC · JPL
251207	2006 UY_{178}	—	October 16, 2006	Catalina	CSS	·	1.9 km	MPC · JPL
251208	2006 UC_{179}	—	October 16, 2006	Catalina	CSS	·	1.8 km	MPC · JPL
251209	2006 UR_{183}	—	October 17, 2006	Catalina	CSS	EUN	2.7 km	MPC · JPL
251210	2006 UF_{184}	—	October 19, 2006	Catalina	CSS	EUN	1.8 km	MPC · JPL
251211	2006 UU_{184}	—	October 24, 2006	Kitami	K. Endate	·	2.8 km	MPC · JPL
251212	2006 UB_{185}	—	October 23, 2006	Catalina	CSS	·	3.6 km	MPC · JPL
251213	2006 UD_{188}	—	October 19, 2006	Catalina	CSS	EUN	1.7 km	MPC · JPL
251214	2006 UB_{189}	—	October 19, 2006	Catalina	CSS	EUN	1.4 km	MPC · JPL
251215	2006 UA_{190}	—	October 19, 2006	Catalina	CSS	·	3.2 km	MPC · JPL
251216	2006 UT_{190}	—	October 19, 2006	Catalina	CSS	·	4.5 km	MPC · JPL
251217	2006 UJ_{192}	—	October 19, 2006	Catalina	CSS	·	2.2 km	MPC · JPL
251218	2006 UV_{201}	—	October 22, 2006	Palomar	NEAT	·	2.4 km	MPC · JPL
251219	2006 US_{202}	—	October 22, 2006	Palomar	NEAT	EUN	1.9 km	MPC · JPL
251220	2006 UN_{203}	—	October 22, 2006	Palomar	NEAT	·	1.9 km	MPC · JPL
251221	2006 UM_{204}	—	October 22, 2006	Kitt Peak	Spacewatch	·	6.0 km	MPC · JPL
251222	2006 UL_{209}	—	October 23, 2006	Kitt Peak	Spacewatch	·	1.7 km	MPC · JPL
251223	2006 UA_{211}	—	October 23, 2006	Kitt Peak	Spacewatch	·	900 m	MPC · JPL
251224	2006 UJ_{218}	—	October 27, 2006	Mount Nyukasa	Japan Aerospace Exploration Agency	·	1.8 km	MPC · JPL
251225	2006 UL_{220}	—	October 16, 2006	Catalina	CSS	·	2.0 km	MPC · JPL
251226	2006 UL_{229}	—	October 20, 2006	Palomar	NEAT	EUN	3.0 km	MPC · JPL
251227	2006 UT_{234}	—	October 22, 2006	Mount Lemmon	Mount Lemmon Survey	·	4.2 km	MPC · JPL
251228	2006 UH_{241}	—	October 23, 2006	Catalina	CSS	·	2.0 km	MPC · JPL
251229	2006 UK_{269}	—	October 27, 2006	Mount Lemmon	Mount Lemmon Survey	·	1.6 km	MPC · JPL
251230	2006 UO_{270}	—	October 27, 2006	Mount Lemmon	Mount Lemmon Survey	·	2.3 km	MPC · JPL
251231	2006 UD_{271}	—	October 27, 2006	Kitt Peak	Spacewatch	·	3.6 km	MPC · JPL
251232	2006 UD_{272}	—	October 27, 2006	Mount Lemmon	Mount Lemmon Survey	·	2.0 km	MPC · JPL
251233	2006 UE_{273}	—	October 27, 2006	Kitt Peak	Spacewatch	·	2.9 km	MPC · JPL
251234	2006 UR_{278}	—	October 28, 2006	Kitt Peak	Spacewatch	·	1.7 km	MPC · JPL
251235	2006 UT_{281}	—	October 28, 2006	Mount Lemmon	Mount Lemmon Survey	·	1.6 km	MPC · JPL
251236	2006 UN_{283}	—	October 28, 2006	Kitt Peak	Spacewatch	·	2.1 km	MPC · JPL
251237	2006 UR_{285}	—	October 28, 2006	Kitt Peak	Spacewatch	·	2.7 km	MPC · JPL
251238	2006 UC_{286}	—	October 28, 2006	Kitt Peak	Spacewatch	·	2.5 km	MPC · JPL
251239	2006 UX_{289}	—	October 31, 2006	Kitt Peak	Spacewatch	·	2.5 km	MPC · JPL
251240	2006 UM_{327}	—	October 27, 2006	Catalina	CSS	WIT	1.3 km	MPC · JPL
251241	2006 UP_{329}	—	October 27, 2006	Catalina	CSS	DOR	3.6 km	MPC · JPL
251242	2006 UE_{359}	—	October 20, 2006	Mount Lemmon	Mount Lemmon Survey	·	2.3 km	MPC · JPL
251243	2006 VZ_{8}	—	November 11, 2006	Kitt Peak	Spacewatch	·	2.8 km	MPC · JPL
251244	2006 VJ_{9}	—	November 11, 2006	Catalina	CSS	·	1.8 km	MPC · JPL
251245	2006 VS_{14}	—	November 9, 2006	Kitt Peak	Spacewatch	PAD	2.8 km	MPC · JPL
251246	2006 VR_{29}	—	November 10, 2006	Kitt Peak	Spacewatch	·	1.9 km	MPC · JPL
251247	2006 VV_{30}	—	November 10, 2006	Kitt Peak	Spacewatch	·	4.4 km	MPC · JPL
251248	2006 VN_{34}	—	November 11, 2006	Catalina	CSS	MAR	1.9 km	MPC · JPL
251249	2006 VX_{40}	—	November 12, 2006	Mount Lemmon	Mount Lemmon Survey	·	3.1 km	MPC · JPL
251250	2006 VQ_{43}	—	November 13, 2006	Kitt Peak	Spacewatch	·	2.7 km	MPC · JPL
251251	2006 VU_{48}	—	November 10, 2006	Kitt Peak	Spacewatch	·	2.5 km	MPC · JPL
251252	2006 VM_{49}	—	November 10, 2006	Kitt Peak	Spacewatch	·	2.9 km	MPC · JPL
251253	2006 VG_{52}	—	November 11, 2006	Kitt Peak	Spacewatch	·	2.2 km	MPC · JPL
251254	2006 VT_{86}	—	November 14, 2006	Socorro	LINEAR	MRX	1.5 km	MPC · JPL
251255	2006 VF_{89}	—	November 14, 2006	Kitt Peak	Spacewatch	·	1.7 km	MPC · JPL
251256	2006 VE_{90}	—	November 14, 2006	Catalina	CSS	·	1.8 km	MPC · JPL
251257	2006 VT_{100}	—	November 11, 2006	Catalina	CSS	EUN	1.9 km	MPC · JPL
251258	2006 VC_{107}	—	November 13, 2006	Kitt Peak	Spacewatch	·	2.6 km	MPC · JPL
251259	2006 VO_{109}	—	November 13, 2006	Catalina	CSS	KON	3.4 km	MPC · JPL
251260	2006 VW_{112}	—	November 13, 2006	Kitt Peak	Spacewatch	·	2.4 km	MPC · JPL
251261	2006 VG_{124}	—	November 14, 2006	Kitt Peak	Spacewatch	KOR	1.5 km	MPC · JPL
251262	2006 VL_{143}	—	November 15, 2006	Kitt Peak	Spacewatch	·	2.1 km	MPC · JPL
251263	2006 VG_{168}	—	November 2, 2006	Mount Lemmon	Mount Lemmon Survey	·	2.2 km	MPC · JPL
251264	2006 WL	—	November 16, 2006	Mount Nyukasa	Japan Aerospace Exploration Agency	(5)	3.5 km	MPC · JPL
251265	2006 WE_{1}	—	November 17, 2006	Pla D'Arguines	R. Ferrando	·	5.2 km	MPC · JPL
251266	2006 WX_{11}	—	November 16, 2006	Mount Lemmon	Mount Lemmon Survey	·	1.9 km	MPC · JPL
251267	2006 WW_{14}	—	November 16, 2006	Catalina	CSS	·	3.6 km	MPC · JPL
251268	2006 WL_{15}	—	November 16, 2006	Lulin	Chang, M.-T., Q. Ye	·	3.2 km	MPC · JPL
251269	2006 WV_{26}	—	November 18, 2006	Socorro	LINEAR	·	2.5 km	MPC · JPL
251270	2006 WH_{32}	—	November 16, 2006	Kitt Peak	Spacewatch	AGN	1.4 km	MPC · JPL
251271	2006 WX_{32}	—	November 16, 2006	Catalina	CSS	·	2.5 km	MPC · JPL
251272	2006 WQ_{39}	—	November 16, 2006	Kitt Peak	Spacewatch	KOR	1.6 km	MPC · JPL
251273	2006 WX_{39}	—	November 16, 2006	Kitt Peak	Spacewatch	·	1.8 km	MPC · JPL
251274	2006 WY_{50}	—	November 16, 2006	Kitt Peak	Spacewatch	·	2.0 km	MPC · JPL
251275	2006 WL_{53}	—	November 16, 2006	Catalina	CSS	EUN	2.2 km	MPC · JPL
251276	2006 WN_{60}	—	November 17, 2006	Kitt Peak	Spacewatch	·	3.0 km	MPC · JPL
251277	2006 WP_{61}	—	November 17, 2006	Catalina	CSS	MRX	1.2 km	MPC · JPL
251278	2006 WX_{61}	—	November 17, 2006	Catalina	CSS	·	3.3 km	MPC · JPL
251279	2006 WB_{66}	—	November 17, 2006	Catalina	CSS	·	4.4 km	MPC · JPL
251280	2006 WD_{69}	—	November 17, 2006	Mount Lemmon	Mount Lemmon Survey	·	2.2 km	MPC · JPL
251281	2006 WF_{69}	—	November 17, 2006	Mount Lemmon	Mount Lemmon Survey	(5)	1.8 km	MPC · JPL
251282	2006 WJ_{77}	—	November 18, 2006	Kitt Peak	Spacewatch	HOF	2.4 km	MPC · JPL
251283	2006 WX_{87}	—	November 18, 2006	Mount Lemmon	Mount Lemmon Survey	·	2.1 km	MPC · JPL
251284	2006 WL_{95}	—	November 19, 2006	Kitt Peak	Spacewatch	·	2.2 km	MPC · JPL
251285	2006 WE_{96}	—	November 19, 2006	Catalina	CSS	PAD	2.2 km	MPC · JPL
251286	2006 WE_{108}	—	November 19, 2006	Socorro	LINEAR	·	1.7 km	MPC · JPL
251287	2006 WK_{116}	—	November 20, 2006	Mount Lemmon	Mount Lemmon Survey	·	2.5 km	MPC · JPL
251288	2006 WL_{120}	—	November 21, 2006	Socorro	LINEAR	·	2.3 km	MPC · JPL
251289	2006 WY_{124}	—	November 22, 2006	Socorro	LINEAR	·	2.4 km	MPC · JPL
251290	2006 WF_{148}	—	November 20, 2006	Socorro	LINEAR	·	2.8 km	MPC · JPL
251291	2006 WU_{153}	—	November 22, 2006	Kitt Peak	Spacewatch	·	1.9 km	MPC · JPL
251292	2006 WD_{173}	—	November 23, 2006	Kitt Peak	Spacewatch	·	2.5 km	MPC · JPL
251293	2006 WC_{188}	—	November 24, 2006	Kitt Peak	Spacewatch	WIT	1.4 km	MPC · JPL
251294	2006 WG_{194}	—	November 27, 2006	Kitt Peak	Spacewatch	·	3.2 km	MPC · JPL
251295	2006 XE_{7}	—	December 9, 2006	Kitt Peak	Spacewatch	KOR	1.6 km	MPC · JPL
251296	2006 XF_{8}	—	December 9, 2006	Kitt Peak	Spacewatch	·	2.4 km	MPC · JPL
251297	2006 XY_{22}	—	December 12, 2006	Kitt Peak	Spacewatch	KOR	1.7 km	MPC · JPL
251298	2006 XY_{38}	—	December 11, 2006	Kitt Peak	Spacewatch	ARM	6.9 km	MPC · JPL
251299	2006 XH_{41}	—	December 12, 2006	Mount Lemmon	Mount Lemmon Survey	EMA	5.4 km	MPC · JPL
251300	2006 XK_{42}	—	December 12, 2006	Catalina	CSS	KOR	1.7 km	MPC · JPL

== 251301–251400 ==
back to top

Designation			Discovery			Properties		Ref
Permanent	Provisional	Named after	Date	Site	Discoverer(s)	Category	Diam.	Ref
251301	2006 XO_{42}	—	December 12, 2006	Mount Lemmon	Mount Lemmon Survey	·	3.2 km	MPC · JPL
251302	2006 XZ_{50}	—	December 13, 2006	Mount Lemmon	Mount Lemmon Survey	JUN	1.7 km	MPC · JPL
251303	2006 XY_{53}	—	December 15, 2006	Socorro	LINEAR	·	2.0 km	MPC · JPL
251304	2006 XT_{54}	—	December 15, 2006	Socorro	LINEAR	·	2.5 km	MPC · JPL
251305	2006 XD_{55}	—	December 15, 2006	Socorro	LINEAR	·	2.2 km	MPC · JPL
251306	2006 XC_{59}	—	December 14, 2006	Kitt Peak	Spacewatch	·	4.1 km	MPC · JPL
251307	2006 XD_{62}	—	December 15, 2006	Kitt Peak	Spacewatch	·	3.6 km	MPC · JPL
251308	2006 XH_{64}	—	December 12, 2006	Socorro	LINEAR	·	3.5 km	MPC · JPL
251309	2006 YQ_{6}	—	December 18, 2006	Socorro	LINEAR	·	5.6 km	MPC · JPL
251310	2006 YQ_{9}	—	December 21, 2006	Kitt Peak	Spacewatch	EOS	2.6 km	MPC · JPL
251311	2006 YS_{14}	—	December 22, 2006	Črni Vrh	Mikuž, H.	·	4.5 km	MPC · JPL
251312	2006 YV_{14}	—	December 23, 2006	Črni Vrh	Mikuž, H.	·	3.0 km	MPC · JPL
251313	2006 YY_{38}	—	December 21, 2006	Kitt Peak	Spacewatch	·	2.0 km	MPC · JPL
251314	2006 YE_{52}	—	December 22, 2006	Catalina	CSS	·	3.2 km	MPC · JPL
251315	2007 AO_{19}	—	January 15, 2007	Catalina	CSS	·	3.5 km	MPC · JPL
251316	2007 AG_{23}	—	January 10, 2007	Mount Lemmon	Mount Lemmon Survey	·	5.0 km	MPC · JPL
251317	2007 BV_{4}	—	January 17, 2007	Palomar	NEAT	EOS	3.2 km	MPC · JPL
251318	2007 BQ_{6}	—	January 17, 2007	Mount Lemmon	Mount Lemmon Survey	·	5.0 km	MPC · JPL
251319	2007 BA_{19}	—	January 18, 2007	Palomar	NEAT	KOR	1.6 km	MPC · JPL
251320	2007 BR_{25}	—	January 24, 2007	Mount Lemmon	Mount Lemmon Survey	·	3.9 km	MPC · JPL
251321	2007 BF_{38}	—	January 24, 2007	Catalina	CSS	·	3.0 km	MPC · JPL
251322	2007 BG_{55}	—	January 24, 2007	Socorro	LINEAR	·	2.8 km	MPC · JPL
251323	2007 BS_{68}	—	January 27, 2007	Mount Lemmon	Mount Lemmon Survey	·	5.1 km	MPC · JPL
251324	2007 CZ_{16}	—	February 8, 2007	Kitt Peak	Spacewatch	·	3.1 km	MPC · JPL
251325 Leopoldjosefine	2007 CX_{26}	Leopoldjosefine	February 9, 2007	Gaisberg	Gierlinger, R.	·	4.8 km	MPC · JPL
251326	2007 CE_{41}	—	February 7, 2007	Kitt Peak	Spacewatch	·	3.1 km	MPC · JPL
251327	2007 CJ_{44}	—	February 8, 2007	Palomar	NEAT	·	3.3 km	MPC · JPL
251328	2007 CM_{60}	—	February 10, 2007	Palomar	NEAT	·	3.4 km	MPC · JPL
251329	2007 DD_{25}	—	February 17, 2007	Kitt Peak	Spacewatch	·	3.5 km	MPC · JPL
251330	2007 DD_{55}	—	February 21, 2007	Socorro	LINEAR	VER	4.4 km	MPC · JPL
251331	2007 DJ_{83}	—	February 25, 2007	Mount Lemmon	Mount Lemmon Survey	VER	4.1 km	MPC · JPL
251332	2007 DY_{87}	—	February 23, 2007	Kitt Peak	Spacewatch	·	4.2 km	MPC · JPL
251333	2007 DY_{106}	—	February 17, 2007	Kitt Peak	Spacewatch	·	5.8 km	MPC · JPL
251334	2007 EZ_{3}	—	March 9, 2007	Kitt Peak	Spacewatch	·	4.1 km	MPC · JPL
251335	2007 EL_{4}	—	March 9, 2007	Mount Lemmon	Mount Lemmon Survey	EOS	4.0 km	MPC · JPL
251336	2007 EU_{14}	—	March 9, 2007	Mount Lemmon	Mount Lemmon Survey	·	3.4 km	MPC · JPL
251337	2007 EZ_{18}	—	March 10, 2007	Mount Lemmon	Mount Lemmon Survey	·	3.0 km	MPC · JPL
251338	2007 EM_{181}	—	March 14, 2007	Kitt Peak	Spacewatch	3:2	7.2 km	MPC · JPL
251339	2007 EC_{202}	—	March 9, 2007	Palomar	NEAT	EOS	3.6 km	MPC · JPL
251340	2007 HJ_{96}	—	April 19, 2007	Siding Spring	SSS	H	670 m	MPC · JPL
251341	2007 OO_{9}	—	July 23, 2007	Črni Vrh	Matičič, S.	H	1.1 km	MPC · JPL
251342	2007 PF_{3}	—	August 4, 2007	Siding Spring	SSS	·	4.1 km	MPC · JPL
251343	2007 PL_{29}	—	August 14, 2007	Socorro	LINEAR	H	870 m	MPC · JPL
251344	2007 RW_{224}	—	September 10, 2007	Kitt Peak	Spacewatch	·	4.8 km	MPC · JPL
251345	2007 RH_{302}	—	September 14, 2007	Mount Lemmon	Mount Lemmon Survey	·	790 m	MPC · JPL
251346	2007 SJ	—	September 17, 2007	Socorro	LINEAR	APO +1km · PHA	1.5 km	MPC · JPL
251347	2007 TY_{12}	—	October 6, 2007	Socorro	LINEAR	·	860 m	MPC · JPL
251348	2007 TG_{22}	—	October 8, 2007	Kitt Peak	Spacewatch	·	920 m	MPC · JPL
251349	2007 TM_{39}	—	October 6, 2007	Kitt Peak	Spacewatch	·	1.6 km	MPC · JPL
251350	2007 TE_{46}	—	October 7, 2007	Kitt Peak	Spacewatch	·	1.1 km	MPC · JPL
251351	2007 TN_{55}	—	October 4, 2007	Kitt Peak	Spacewatch	·	1.3 km	MPC · JPL
251352	2007 TH_{62}	—	October 7, 2007	Mount Lemmon	Mount Lemmon Survey	·	800 m	MPC · JPL
251353	2007 TJ_{114}	—	October 8, 2007	Catalina	CSS	·	1.1 km	MPC · JPL
251354	2007 TY_{131}	—	October 7, 2007	Mount Lemmon	Mount Lemmon Survey	·	950 m	MPC · JPL
251355	2007 TR_{141}	—	October 9, 2007	Mount Lemmon	Mount Lemmon Survey	NYS	1.7 km	MPC · JPL
251356	2007 TM_{163}	—	October 11, 2007	Socorro	LINEAR	·	800 m	MPC · JPL
251357	2007 TW_{168}	—	October 12, 2007	Socorro	LINEAR	·	750 m	MPC · JPL
251358	2007 TM_{179}	—	October 7, 2007	Catalina	CSS	·	1.3 km	MPC · JPL
251359	2007 TF_{212}	—	October 7, 2007	Kitt Peak	Spacewatch	V	970 m	MPC · JPL
251360	2007 TJ_{261}	—	October 10, 2007	Kitt Peak	Spacewatch	·	820 m	MPC · JPL
251361	2007 TH_{309}	—	October 10, 2007	Mount Lemmon	Mount Lemmon Survey	·	800 m	MPC · JPL
251362	2007 TU_{408}	—	October 14, 2007	Catalina	CSS	·	880 m	MPC · JPL
251363	2007 TX_{418}	—	October 9, 2007	Kitt Peak	Spacewatch	V	820 m	MPC · JPL
251364	2007 TE_{419}	—	October 10, 2007	Kitt Peak	Spacewatch	·	1.4 km	MPC · JPL
251365	2007 TQ_{447}	—	October 13, 2007	Socorro	LINEAR	·	810 m	MPC · JPL
251366	2007 TR_{451}	—	October 9, 2007	Kitt Peak	Spacewatch	·	1.0 km	MPC · JPL
251367	2007 UZ_{35}	—	October 19, 2007	Catalina	CSS	AGN	1.4 km	MPC · JPL
251368	2007 UO_{41}	—	October 16, 2007	Kitt Peak	Spacewatch	·	1.3 km	MPC · JPL
251369	2007 UA_{47}	—	October 20, 2007	Catalina	CSS	·	940 m	MPC · JPL
251370	2007 UF_{57}	—	October 30, 2007	Kitt Peak	Spacewatch	·	800 m	MPC · JPL
251371	2007 UR_{86}	—	October 30, 2007	Kitt Peak	Spacewatch	·	800 m	MPC · JPL
251372	2007 UY_{104}	—	October 30, 2007	Kitt Peak	Spacewatch	·	1.2 km	MPC · JPL
251373	2007 VO_{9}	—	November 2, 2007	Catalina	CSS	·	1.3 km	MPC · JPL
251374	2007 VC_{15}	—	November 1, 2007	Kitt Peak	Spacewatch	·	850 m	MPC · JPL
251375	2007 VX_{54}	—	November 1, 2007	Kitt Peak	Spacewatch	·	1.1 km	MPC · JPL
251376	2007 VK_{55}	—	November 1, 2007	Kitt Peak	Spacewatch	·	730 m	MPC · JPL
251377	2007 VJ_{64}	—	November 1, 2007	Kitt Peak	Spacewatch	·	820 m	MPC · JPL
251378	2007 VF_{74}	—	November 3, 2007	Kitt Peak	Spacewatch	MAS	870 m	MPC · JPL
251379	2007 VZ_{79}	—	November 3, 2007	Kitt Peak	Spacewatch	·	1.9 km	MPC · JPL
251380	2007 VK_{80}	—	November 3, 2007	Kitt Peak	Spacewatch	·	2.6 km	MPC · JPL
251381	2007 VE_{87}	—	November 2, 2007	Socorro	LINEAR	·	1.3 km	MPC · JPL
251382	2007 VB_{90}	—	November 4, 2007	Socorro	LINEAR	·	920 m	MPC · JPL
251383	2007 VA_{96}	—	November 7, 2007	Bisei SG Center	BATTeRS	·	810 m	MPC · JPL
251384	2007 VJ_{138}	—	November 2, 2007	Kitt Peak	Spacewatch	·	1.1 km	MPC · JPL
251385	2007 VJ_{163}	—	November 5, 2007	Kitt Peak	Spacewatch	·	1.3 km	MPC · JPL
251386	2007 VG_{165}	—	November 5, 2007	Kitt Peak	Spacewatch	·	820 m	MPC · JPL
251387	2007 VO_{174}	—	November 3, 2007	Mount Lemmon	Mount Lemmon Survey	·	1.0 km	MPC · JPL
251388	2007 VS_{186}	—	November 12, 2007	Bisei SG Center	BATTeRS	·	2.8 km	MPC · JPL
251389	2007 VR_{193}	—	November 4, 2007	Mount Lemmon	Mount Lemmon Survey	NEM	2.8 km	MPC · JPL
251390	2007 VY_{202}	—	November 8, 2007	Catalina	CSS	·	1.2 km	MPC · JPL
251391	2007 VD_{209}	—	November 7, 2007	Kitt Peak	Spacewatch	·	2.0 km	MPC · JPL
251392	2007 VQ_{267}	—	November 15, 2007	La Sagra	OAM	·	920 m	MPC · JPL
251393	2007 VJ_{330}	—	November 3, 2007	Mount Lemmon	Mount Lemmon Survey	NYS	790 m	MPC · JPL
251394	2007 WA_{39}	—	November 19, 2007	Kitt Peak	Spacewatch	·	1.4 km	MPC · JPL
251395	2007 WD_{44}	—	November 19, 2007	Mount Lemmon	Mount Lemmon Survey	·	2.2 km	MPC · JPL
251396	2007 WG_{60}	—	November 17, 2007	Kitt Peak	Spacewatch	·	1.4 km	MPC · JPL
251397	2007 XP_{22}	—	December 10, 2007	Socorro	LINEAR	·	1.8 km	MPC · JPL
251398	2007 XB_{24}	—	December 14, 2007	La Sagra	OAM	·	970 m	MPC · JPL
251399	2007 XR_{33}	—	December 10, 2007	Socorro	LINEAR	EUN	4.4 km	MPC · JPL
251400	2007 XM_{57}	—	December 4, 2007	Socorro	LINEAR	NYS	2.0 km	MPC · JPL

== 251401–251500 ==
back to top

Designation			Discovery			Properties		Ref
Permanent	Provisional	Named after	Date	Site	Discoverer(s)	Category	Diam.	Ref
251401	2007 YJ_{7}	—	December 16, 2007	Kitt Peak	Spacewatch	MAS	740 m	MPC · JPL
251402	2007 YL_{22}	—	December 16, 2007	Kitt Peak	Spacewatch	NYS	1.5 km	MPC · JPL
251403	2007 YA_{24}	—	December 17, 2007	Mount Lemmon	Mount Lemmon Survey	·	2.9 km	MPC · JPL
251404	2007 YO_{31}	—	December 28, 2007	Kitt Peak	Spacewatch	·	1.8 km	MPC · JPL
251405	2007 YT_{31}	—	December 28, 2007	Lulin	LUSS	·	970 m	MPC · JPL
251406	2007 YO_{63}	—	December 31, 2007	Kitt Peak	Spacewatch	·	2.2 km	MPC · JPL
251407	2008 AH_{3}	—	January 8, 2008	Dauban	Kugel, F.	·	3.8 km	MPC · JPL
251408	2008 AU_{3}	—	January 4, 2008	Bisei SG Center	BATTeRS	V	890 m	MPC · JPL
251409	2008 AF_{6}	—	January 10, 2008	Mount Lemmon	Mount Lemmon Survey	·	1.8 km	MPC · JPL
251410	2008 AS_{10}	—	January 10, 2008	Mount Lemmon	Mount Lemmon Survey	·	1.3 km	MPC · JPL
251411	2008 AJ_{18}	—	January 10, 2008	Mount Lemmon	Mount Lemmon Survey	·	2.7 km	MPC · JPL
251412	2008 AB_{29}	—	January 11, 2008	Mayhill	Lowe, A.	·	4.1 km	MPC · JPL
251413	2008 AA_{30}	—	January 8, 2008	Altschwendt	W. Ries	·	1.8 km	MPC · JPL
251414	2008 AV_{38}	—	January 10, 2008	Catalina	CSS	·	4.4 km	MPC · JPL
251415	2008 AT_{43}	—	January 10, 2008	Kitt Peak	Spacewatch	·	1.8 km	MPC · JPL
251416	2008 AN_{50}	—	January 11, 2008	Kitt Peak	Spacewatch	·	2.6 km	MPC · JPL
251417	2008 AX_{60}	—	January 11, 2008	Kitt Peak	Spacewatch	·	2.0 km	MPC · JPL
251418	2008 AP_{65}	—	January 11, 2008	Kitt Peak	Spacewatch	·	3.7 km	MPC · JPL
251419	2008 AY_{74}	—	January 11, 2008	Kitt Peak	Spacewatch	·	1.4 km	MPC · JPL
251420	2008 AQ_{79}	—	January 12, 2008	Kitt Peak	Spacewatch	·	3.0 km	MPC · JPL
251421	2008 AR_{81}	—	January 13, 2008	Mount Lemmon	Mount Lemmon Survey	·	3.2 km	MPC · JPL
251422	2008 AE_{86}	—	January 13, 2008	Kitt Peak	Spacewatch	·	1.4 km	MPC · JPL
251423	2008 AP_{96}	—	January 14, 2008	Kitt Peak	Spacewatch	·	3.0 km	MPC · JPL
251424	2008 AH_{110}	—	January 15, 2008	Kitt Peak	Spacewatch	·	4.4 km	MPC · JPL
251425	2008 AZ_{113}	—	January 10, 2008	Mount Lemmon	Mount Lemmon Survey	·	4.1 km	MPC · JPL
251426	2008 AM_{128}	—	January 13, 2008	Kitt Peak	Spacewatch	WIT	1.1 km	MPC · JPL
251427	2008 BH_{15}	—	January 28, 2008	La Sagra	OAM	NYS	1.7 km	MPC · JPL
251428	2008 BD_{16}	—	January 28, 2008	Lulin	LUSS	·	880 m	MPC · JPL
251429	2008 BV_{21}	—	January 30, 2008	Mount Lemmon	Mount Lemmon Survey	·	5.4 km	MPC · JPL
251430	2008 BV_{32}	—	January 30, 2008	Kitt Peak	Spacewatch	EOS	3.3 km	MPC · JPL
251431	2008 BY_{32}	—	January 30, 2008	Kitt Peak	Spacewatch	·	2.3 km	MPC · JPL
251432	2008 BG_{35}	—	January 30, 2008	Mount Lemmon	Mount Lemmon Survey	·	3.5 km	MPC · JPL
251433	2008 BK_{36}	—	January 30, 2008	Kitt Peak	Spacewatch	PAD	3.2 km	MPC · JPL
251434	2008 BL_{48}	—	January 18, 2008	Mount Lemmon	Mount Lemmon Survey	·	4.0 km	MPC · JPL
251435	2008 BO_{48}	—	January 30, 2008	Mount Lemmon	Mount Lemmon Survey	·	1.6 km	MPC · JPL
251436	2008 CL_{8}	—	February 2, 2008	Kitt Peak	Spacewatch	·	2.5 km	MPC · JPL
251437	2008 CJ_{18}	—	February 3, 2008	Kitt Peak	Spacewatch	·	3.4 km	MPC · JPL
251438	2008 CE_{21}	—	February 6, 2008	Bisei SG Center	BATTeRS	HNS	1.7 km	MPC · JPL
251439	2008 CE_{33}	—	February 2, 2008	Kitt Peak	Spacewatch	·	2.4 km	MPC · JPL
251440	2008 CR_{41}	—	February 2, 2008	Kitt Peak	Spacewatch	·	1.6 km	MPC · JPL
251441	2008 CK_{42}	—	February 2, 2008	Kitt Peak	Spacewatch	·	3.5 km	MPC · JPL
251442	2008 CW_{45}	—	February 2, 2008	Catalina	CSS	·	3.5 km	MPC · JPL
251443	2008 CY_{47}	—	February 3, 2008	Catalina	CSS	·	2.6 km	MPC · JPL
251444	2008 CN_{60}	—	February 7, 2008	Mount Lemmon	Mount Lemmon Survey	PHO	1.1 km	MPC · JPL
251445	2008 CK_{68}	—	February 5, 2008	La Sagra	OAM	·	2.7 km	MPC · JPL
251446	2008 CO_{78}	—	February 7, 2008	Kitt Peak	Spacewatch	(5)	1.5 km	MPC · JPL
251447	2008 CF_{91}	—	February 8, 2008	Kitt Peak	Spacewatch	·	4.1 km	MPC · JPL
251448	2008 CC_{112}	—	February 10, 2008	Kitt Peak	Spacewatch	·	2.3 km	MPC · JPL
251449 Olexakorolʹ	2008 CK_{117}	Olexakorolʹ	February 11, 2008	Andrushivka	Andrushivka	·	4.7 km	MPC · JPL
251450	2008 CD_{120}	—	February 11, 2008	Dauban	Kugel, F.	·	3.0 km	MPC · JPL
251451	2008 CR_{125}	—	February 8, 2008	Kitt Peak	Spacewatch	·	3.7 km	MPC · JPL
251452	2008 CW_{132}	—	February 8, 2008	Kitt Peak	Spacewatch	(17392)	1.9 km	MPC · JPL
251453	2008 CA_{139}	—	February 8, 2008	Kitt Peak	Spacewatch	·	2.3 km	MPC · JPL
251454	2008 CB_{140}	—	February 8, 2008	Kitt Peak	Spacewatch	·	1.9 km	MPC · JPL
251455	2008 CM_{141}	—	February 8, 2008	Kitt Peak	Spacewatch	HYG	4.4 km	MPC · JPL
251456	2008 CS_{143}	—	February 8, 2008	Kitt Peak	Spacewatch	NEM	2.9 km	MPC · JPL
251457	2008 CT_{152}	—	February 9, 2008	Catalina	CSS	·	2.5 km	MPC · JPL
251458	2008 CK_{180}	—	February 9, 2008	Catalina	CSS	·	2.8 km	MPC · JPL
251459	2008 CX_{180}	—	February 9, 2008	Catalina	CSS	EOS	5.3 km	MPC · JPL
251460	2008 CV_{193}	—	February 8, 2008	Kitt Peak	Spacewatch	·	5.5 km	MPC · JPL
251461	2008 CZ_{193}	—	February 9, 2008	Kitt Peak	Spacewatch	·	4.7 km	MPC · JPL
251462	2008 CC_{195}	—	February 13, 2008	Kitt Peak	Spacewatch	·	4.3 km	MPC · JPL
251463	2008 CW_{195}	—	February 3, 2008	Kitt Peak	Spacewatch	EOS	3.2 km	MPC · JPL
251464	2008 CC_{196}	—	February 8, 2008	Mount Lemmon	Mount Lemmon Survey	·	4.6 km	MPC · JPL
251465	2008 CP_{198}	—	February 12, 2008	Kitt Peak	Spacewatch	·	2.6 km	MPC · JPL
251466	2008 CV_{206}	—	February 10, 2008	Mount Lemmon	Mount Lemmon Survey	·	2.3 km	MPC · JPL
251467	2008 CF_{213}	—	February 9, 2008	Socorro	LINEAR	EOS	2.8 km	MPC · JPL
251468	2008 DH_{10}	—	February 26, 2008	Anderson Mesa	LONEOS	EUN	3.6 km	MPC · JPL
251469	2008 DT_{13}	—	February 26, 2008	Mount Lemmon	Mount Lemmon Survey	·	2.2 km	MPC · JPL
251470	2008 DR_{18}	—	February 26, 2008	Kitt Peak	Spacewatch	·	5.5 km	MPC · JPL
251471	2008 DW_{23}	—	February 26, 2008	Mount Lemmon	Mount Lemmon Survey	AST	2.0 km	MPC · JPL
251472	2008 DB_{27}	—	February 29, 2008	Kitt Peak	Spacewatch	·	2.8 km	MPC · JPL
251473	2008 DT_{30}	—	February 27, 2008	Kitt Peak	Spacewatch	·	2.0 km	MPC · JPL
251474	2008 DW_{30}	—	February 27, 2008	Kitt Peak	Spacewatch	NYS	1.4 km	MPC · JPL
251475	2008 DV_{32}	—	February 27, 2008	Kitt Peak	Spacewatch	HOF	3.1 km	MPC · JPL
251476	2008 DX_{32}	—	February 27, 2008	Kitt Peak	Spacewatch	·	3.7 km	MPC · JPL
251477	2008 DZ_{52}	—	February 29, 2008	Mount Lemmon	Mount Lemmon Survey	·	4.4 km	MPC · JPL
251478	2008 DB_{55}	—	February 26, 2008	Kitt Peak	Spacewatch	KOR	1.8 km	MPC · JPL
251479	2008 DG_{57}	—	February 28, 2008	Catalina	CSS	·	5.0 km	MPC · JPL
251480	2008 DT_{57}	—	February 28, 2008	Catalina	CSS	·	4.8 km	MPC · JPL
251481	2008 DC_{59}	—	February 27, 2008	Kitt Peak	Spacewatch	AGN	1.4 km	MPC · JPL
251482	2008 DF_{76}	—	February 28, 2008	Mount Lemmon	Mount Lemmon Survey	·	3.8 km	MPC · JPL
251483	2008 DR_{80}	—	February 18, 2008	Mount Lemmon	Mount Lemmon Survey	AGN	1.5 km	MPC · JPL
251484	2008 DC_{84}	—	February 18, 2008	Mount Lemmon	Mount Lemmon Survey	·	2.2 km	MPC · JPL
251485 Bois-d'Amont	2008 ED_{7}	Bois-d'Amont	March 2, 2008	Marly	P. Kocher	·	2.1 km	MPC · JPL
251486	2008 EG_{7}	—	March 2, 2008	Catalina	CSS	·	3.7 km	MPC · JPL
251487	2008 EY_{7}	—	March 3, 2008	La Sagra	OAM	·	3.4 km	MPC · JPL
251488	2008 EZ_{14}	—	March 1, 2008	Kitt Peak	Spacewatch	EOS	2.1 km	MPC · JPL
251489	2008 EA_{27}	—	March 4, 2008	Mount Lemmon	Mount Lemmon Survey	EOS	2.6 km	MPC · JPL
251490	2008 EU_{35}	—	March 3, 2008	Kitt Peak	Spacewatch	·	3.6 km	MPC · JPL
251491	2008 EZ_{35}	—	March 3, 2008	Catalina	CSS	EOS	3.6 km	MPC · JPL
251492	2008 ET_{36}	—	March 3, 2008	Purple Mountain	PMO NEO Survey Program	·	2.1 km	MPC · JPL
251493	2008 EG_{42}	—	March 4, 2008	Mount Lemmon	Mount Lemmon Survey	EOS	4.5 km	MPC · JPL
251494	2008 EU_{49}	—	March 6, 2008	Kitt Peak	Spacewatch	GEF	1.5 km	MPC · JPL
251495	2008 ED_{71}	—	March 6, 2008	Mount Lemmon	Mount Lemmon Survey	·	3.1 km	MPC · JPL
251496	2008 EG_{79}	—	March 8, 2008	Catalina	CSS	EUN ·	3.4 km	MPC · JPL
251497	2008 EK_{97}	—	March 8, 2008	Mount Lemmon	Mount Lemmon Survey	·	2.7 km	MPC · JPL
251498	2008 EQ_{108}	—	March 7, 2008	Mount Lemmon	Mount Lemmon Survey	KOR	1.7 km	MPC · JPL
251499	2008 EC_{109}	—	March 7, 2008	Mount Lemmon	Mount Lemmon Survey	·	2.2 km	MPC · JPL
251500	2008 EA_{116}	—	March 8, 2008	Mount Lemmon	Mount Lemmon Survey	KON	2.3 km	MPC · JPL

== 251501–251600 ==
back to top

Designation			Discovery			Properties		Ref
Permanent	Provisional	Named after	Date	Site	Discoverer(s)	Category	Diam.	Ref
251501	2008 EU_{125}	—	March 10, 2008	Kitt Peak	Spacewatch	·	3.3 km	MPC · JPL
251502	2008 EU_{128}	—	March 11, 2008	Kitt Peak	Spacewatch	·	3.0 km	MPC · JPL
251503	2008 EC_{129}	—	March 11, 2008	Kitt Peak	Spacewatch	·	5.1 km	MPC · JPL
251504	2008 EC_{146}	—	March 14, 2008	Purple Mountain	PMO NEO Survey Program	·	3.5 km	MPC · JPL
251505	2008 EQ_{151}	—	March 8, 2008	Mount Lemmon	Mount Lemmon Survey	·	3.8 km	MPC · JPL
251506	2008 FB_{2}	—	March 25, 2008	Kitt Peak	Spacewatch	·	4.3 km	MPC · JPL
251507	2008 FJ_{3}	—	March 25, 2008	Kitt Peak	Spacewatch	·	2.5 km	MPC · JPL
251508	2008 FD_{8}	—	March 25, 2008	Kitt Peak	Spacewatch	·	2.0 km	MPC · JPL
251509	2008 FY_{13}	—	March 26, 2008	Mount Lemmon	Mount Lemmon Survey	·	4.7 km	MPC · JPL
251510	2008 FZ_{32}	—	March 28, 2008	Mount Lemmon	Mount Lemmon Survey	KOR	1.5 km	MPC · JPL
251511	2008 FQ_{41}	—	March 28, 2008	Mount Lemmon	Mount Lemmon Survey	·	3.9 km	MPC · JPL
251512 Jacobcollier	2008 FK_{58}	Jacobcollier	March 28, 2008	Mount Lemmon	Mount Lemmon Survey	CYB	5.8 km	MPC · JPL
251513	2008 FY_{61}	—	March 25, 2008	Kitt Peak	Spacewatch	·	3.6 km	MPC · JPL
251514	2008 FH_{68}	—	March 28, 2008	Mount Lemmon	Mount Lemmon Survey	·	4.4 km	MPC · JPL
251515	2008 FJ_{78}	—	March 27, 2008	Mount Lemmon	Mount Lemmon Survey	·	5.5 km	MPC · JPL
251516	2008 FJ_{81}	—	March 27, 2008	Mount Lemmon	Mount Lemmon Survey	NAE	4.2 km	MPC · JPL
251517	2008 FZ_{117}	—	March 31, 2008	Kitt Peak	Spacewatch	·	4.2 km	MPC · JPL
251518	2008 FW_{118}	—	March 31, 2008	Mount Lemmon	Mount Lemmon Survey	CYB	5.6 km	MPC · JPL
251519	2008 FY_{123}	—	March 29, 2008	Catalina	CSS	EUP	5.3 km	MPC · JPL
251520	2008 FB_{131}	—	March 29, 2008	Kitt Peak	Spacewatch	·	4.0 km	MPC · JPL
251521	2008 GO_{3}	—	April 6, 2008	Kanab	Sheridan, E.	·	4.4 km	MPC · JPL
251522	2008 GZ_{33}	—	April 3, 2008	Mount Lemmon	Mount Lemmon Survey	TEL	1.9 km	MPC · JPL
251523	2008 GA_{49}	—	April 5, 2008	Kitt Peak	Spacewatch	·	2.1 km	MPC · JPL
251524	2008 GU_{50}	—	April 5, 2008	Mount Lemmon	Mount Lemmon Survey	EOS	2.5 km	MPC · JPL
251525	2008 GX_{60}	—	April 5, 2008	Catalina	CSS	·	2.4 km	MPC · JPL
251526	2008 GX_{98}	—	April 9, 2008	Kitt Peak	Spacewatch	KOR	2.0 km	MPC · JPL
251527	2008 GV_{137}	—	April 8, 2008	Kitt Peak	Spacewatch	·	4.7 km	MPC · JPL
251528	2008 GU_{141}	—	April 14, 2008	Mount Lemmon	Mount Lemmon Survey	L5	10 km	MPC · JPL
251529	2008 HR_{1}	—	April 24, 2008	Kitt Peak	Spacewatch	EOS	2.5 km	MPC · JPL
251530	2008 HT_{16}	—	April 25, 2008	Mount Lemmon	Mount Lemmon Survey	·	4.3 km	MPC · JPL
251531	2008 HA_{28}	—	April 28, 2008	Kitt Peak	Spacewatch	·	4.2 km	MPC · JPL
251532	2008 HE_{30}	—	April 29, 2008	Kitt Peak	Spacewatch	KOR	1.7 km	MPC · JPL
251533	2008 JQ_{17}	—	May 4, 2008	Kitt Peak	Spacewatch	·	5.0 km	MPC · JPL
251534	2008 KK_{4}	—	May 27, 2008	Kitt Peak	Spacewatch	L5	10 km	MPC · JPL
251535	2008 KK_{8}	—	May 27, 2008	Kitt Peak	Spacewatch	L5	9.3 km	MPC · JPL
251536	2008 SK_{257}	—	September 22, 2008	Kitt Peak	Spacewatch	L4	14 km	MPC · JPL
251537	2008 UE_{5}	—	October 26, 2008	Catalina	CSS	H	910 m	MPC · JPL
251538	2008 WZ_{128}	—	November 21, 2008	Mount Lemmon	Mount Lemmon Survey	H	820 m	MPC · JPL
251539	2008 XQ_{43}	—	December 2, 2008	Kitt Peak	Spacewatch	H	840 m	MPC · JPL
251540	2008 YF_{1}	—	December 19, 2008	La Sagra	OAM	HYG	5.1 km	MPC · JPL
251541	2008 YG_{172}	—	December 29, 2008	Mount Lemmon	Mount Lemmon Survey	·	2.2 km	MPC · JPL
251542	2009 AB_{47}	—	January 7, 2009	Kitt Peak	Spacewatch	·	1.1 km	MPC · JPL
251543	2009 BM_{62}	—	January 18, 2009	Purple Mountain	PMO NEO Survey Program	H	760 m	MPC · JPL
251544	2009 BA_{70}	—	January 25, 2009	Catalina	CSS	H	780 m	MPC · JPL
251545	2009 BK_{97}	—	January 25, 2009	Kitt Peak	Spacewatch	NYS	1.2 km	MPC · JPL
251546	2009 BR_{147}	—	January 30, 2009	Mount Lemmon	Mount Lemmon Survey	·	900 m	MPC · JPL
251547	2009 BA_{150}	—	January 31, 2009	Kitt Peak	Spacewatch	·	910 m	MPC · JPL
251548	2009 BO_{177}	—	January 30, 2009	Mount Lemmon	Mount Lemmon Survey	·	940 m	MPC · JPL
251549	2009 CE_{23}	—	February 1, 2009	Kitt Peak	Spacewatch	·	960 m	MPC · JPL
251550	2009 CP_{30}	—	February 1, 2009	Kitt Peak	Spacewatch	·	1.1 km	MPC · JPL
251551	2009 CJ_{31}	—	February 1, 2009	Kitt Peak	Spacewatch	·	950 m	MPC · JPL
251552	2009 CO_{44}	—	February 14, 2009	Kitt Peak	Spacewatch	·	1.0 km	MPC · JPL
251553	2009 CC_{50}	—	February 14, 2009	La Sagra	OAM	·	1.1 km	MPC · JPL
251554	2009 CX_{58}	—	February 4, 2009	Mount Lemmon	Mount Lemmon Survey	DOR	2.8 km	MPC · JPL
251555	2009 CF_{64}	—	February 2, 2009	Kitt Peak	Spacewatch	·	950 m	MPC · JPL
251556	2009 DY_{14}	—	February 20, 2009	Calvin-Rehoboth	Calvin College	·	1.3 km	MPC · JPL
251557	2009 DJ_{15}	—	February 16, 2009	La Sagra	OAM	·	970 m	MPC · JPL
251558	2009 DD_{18}	—	February 19, 2009	Kitt Peak	Spacewatch	·	1.2 km	MPC · JPL
251559	2009 DV_{45}	—	February 23, 2009	Socorro	LINEAR	·	2.2 km	MPC · JPL
251560	2009 DY_{60}	—	February 22, 2009	Kitt Peak	Spacewatch	·	2.1 km	MPC · JPL
251561	2009 DV_{63}	—	February 22, 2009	Kitt Peak	Spacewatch	V	1.1 km	MPC · JPL
251562	2009 DQ_{71}	—	February 19, 2009	La Sagra	OAM	·	1.8 km	MPC · JPL
251563	2009 DN_{91}	—	February 27, 2009	Kitt Peak	Spacewatch	·	1.6 km	MPC · JPL
251564	2009 DP_{120}	—	February 27, 2009	Kitt Peak	Spacewatch	·	2.4 km	MPC · JPL
251565	2009 DQ_{130}	—	February 27, 2009	Kitt Peak	Spacewatch	CLA	1.9 km	MPC · JPL
251566	2009 DL_{141}	—	February 20, 2009	Kitt Peak	Spacewatch	·	2.7 km	MPC · JPL
251567	2009 DQ_{141}	—	February 26, 2009	Kitt Peak	Spacewatch	·	1.1 km	MPC · JPL
251568	2009 EL_{15}	—	March 15, 2009	Kitt Peak	Spacewatch	·	900 m	MPC · JPL
251569	2009 EB_{18}	—	March 15, 2009	Kitt Peak	Spacewatch	·	790 m	MPC · JPL
251570	2009 ES_{22}	—	March 3, 2009	Kitt Peak	Spacewatch	MAS	970 m	MPC · JPL
251571	2009 ES_{26}	—	March 2, 2009	Mount Lemmon	Mount Lemmon Survey	·	1.6 km	MPC · JPL
251572	2009 FN_{1}	—	March 16, 2009	La Sagra	OAM	·	1.7 km	MPC · JPL
251573	2009 FA_{8}	—	March 16, 2009	Kitt Peak	Spacewatch	V	780 m	MPC · JPL
251574	2009 FN_{18}	—	March 19, 2009	La Sagra	OAM	·	1.9 km	MPC · JPL
251575	2009 FE_{25}	—	March 23, 2009	La Sagra	OAM	·	2.9 km	MPC · JPL
251576	2009 FB_{27}	—	March 19, 2009	Mount Lemmon	Mount Lemmon Survey	·	4.6 km	MPC · JPL
251577	2009 FQ_{44}	—	March 21, 2009	La Sagra	OAM	·	2.1 km	MPC · JPL
251578	2009 FX_{45}	—	March 27, 2009	Kitt Peak	Spacewatch	·	2.0 km	MPC · JPL
251579	2009 FZ_{47}	—	March 19, 2009	Catalina	CSS	·	2.7 km	MPC · JPL
251580	2009 FC_{50}	—	March 27, 2009	Catalina	CSS	·	2.6 km	MPC · JPL
251581	2009 FJ_{61}	—	March 16, 2009	Catalina	CSS	T_{j} (2.9)	6.5 km	MPC · JPL
251582	2009 FL_{68}	—	March 19, 2009	Catalina	CSS	·	2.0 km	MPC · JPL
251583	2009 FZ_{68}	—	March 16, 2009	Kitt Peak	Spacewatch	·	2.5 km	MPC · JPL
251584	2009 FP_{70}	—	March 21, 2009	Kitt Peak	Spacewatch	·	740 m	MPC · JPL
251585	2009 FM_{71}	—	March 31, 2009	Mount Lemmon	Mount Lemmon Survey	·	2.5 km	MPC · JPL
251586	2009 FC_{75}	—	March 16, 2009	Catalina	CSS	·	2.3 km	MPC · JPL
251587	2009 FU_{75}	—	March 21, 2009	Mount Lemmon	Mount Lemmon Survey	MAS	890 m	MPC · JPL
251588	2009 FE_{76}	—	March 24, 2009	Kitt Peak	Spacewatch	·	4.5 km	MPC · JPL
251589	2009 HW_{1}	—	April 17, 2009	Catalina	CSS	·	1.9 km	MPC · JPL
251590	2009 HT_{6}	—	April 17, 2009	Kitt Peak	Spacewatch	·	1.5 km	MPC · JPL
251591	2009 HQ_{10}	—	April 18, 2009	Mount Lemmon	Mount Lemmon Survey	·	710 m	MPC · JPL
251592	2009 HK_{12}	—	April 18, 2009	Piszkéstető	K. Sárneczky	MIS	2.8 km	MPC · JPL
251593	2009 HC_{25}	—	April 17, 2009	Kitt Peak	Spacewatch	·	1.7 km	MPC · JPL
251594	2009 HY_{26}	—	April 18, 2009	Kitt Peak	Spacewatch	MAS	860 m	MPC · JPL
251595 Rudolfböttger	2009 HA_{36}	Rudolfböttger	April 20, 2009	Taunus	Karge, S., R. Kling	·	1.2 km	MPC · JPL
251596	2009 HV_{38}	—	April 18, 2009	Kitt Peak	Spacewatch	LIX	5.3 km	MPC · JPL
251597	2009 HP_{39}	—	April 18, 2009	Mount Lemmon	Mount Lemmon Survey	MAR	1.6 km	MPC · JPL
251598	2009 HA_{40}	—	April 20, 2009	Kitt Peak	Spacewatch	·	1.4 km	MPC · JPL
251599	2009 HE_{64}	—	April 22, 2009	Mount Lemmon	Mount Lemmon Survey	V	900 m	MPC · JPL
251600	2009 HQ_{69}	—	April 22, 2009	Mount Lemmon	Mount Lemmon Survey	·	4.0 km	MPC · JPL

== 251601–251700 ==
back to top

Designation			Discovery			Properties		Ref
Permanent	Provisional	Named after	Date	Site	Discoverer(s)	Category	Diam.	Ref
251601	2009 HR_{75}	—	April 28, 2009	Kitt Peak	Spacewatch	KON	2.5 km	MPC · JPL
251602	2009 HS_{82}	—	April 24, 2009	Mount Lemmon	Mount Lemmon Survey	·	1.6 km	MPC · JPL
251603	2009 HO_{83}	—	April 27, 2009	Kitt Peak	Spacewatch	·	1.5 km	MPC · JPL
251604	2009 HN_{89}	—	April 29, 2009	La Sagra	OAM	·	3.4 km	MPC · JPL
251605	2009 HB_{90}	—	April 18, 2009	Mount Lemmon	Mount Lemmon Survey	·	1.9 km	MPC · JPL
251606	2009 HA_{91}	—	April 21, 2009	La Sagra	OAM	·	1.8 km	MPC · JPL
251607	2009 HP_{94}	—	April 28, 2009	Cerro Burek	Burek, Cerro	·	1.6 km	MPC · JPL
251608	2009 HH_{98}	—	April 20, 2009	Kitt Peak	Spacewatch	·	2.2 km	MPC · JPL
251609	2009 HJ_{99}	—	April 20, 2009	Kitt Peak	Spacewatch	·	3.2 km	MPC · JPL
251610	2009 HL_{101}	—	April 23, 2009	Kitt Peak	Spacewatch	WIT	1.3 km	MPC · JPL
251611	2009 HQ_{101}	—	April 20, 2009	Mount Lemmon	Mount Lemmon Survey	·	1.6 km	MPC · JPL
251612	2009 HZ_{101}	—	April 19, 2009	Kitt Peak	Spacewatch	·	2.3 km	MPC · JPL
251613	2009 HH_{105}	—	April 21, 2009	Kitt Peak	Spacewatch	·	1.9 km	MPC · JPL
251614	2009 JE_{7}	—	May 13, 2009	Kitt Peak	Spacewatch	·	2.4 km	MPC · JPL
251615	2009 JA_{8}	—	May 13, 2009	Kitt Peak	Spacewatch	·	2.1 km	MPC · JPL
251616	2009 JY_{16}	—	May 13, 2009	Kitt Peak	Spacewatch	EOS	2.3 km	MPC · JPL
251617	2009 JG_{18}	—	May 5, 2009	Kitt Peak	Spacewatch	EUN	1.5 km	MPC · JPL
251618	2009 KE_{15}	—	May 26, 2009	Catalina	CSS	·	2.2 km	MPC · JPL
251619 Ravenna	2009 LS_{2}	Ravenna	June 13, 2009	Skylive	Tozzi, F.	MAR	1.7 km	MPC · JPL
251620	2009 MH	—	June 16, 2009	Kitt Peak	Spacewatch	·	4.4 km	MPC · JPL
251621 Lüthen	2009 RR_{2}	Lüthen	September 10, 2009	ESA OGS	Busch, M., Kresken, R.	·	1.8 km	MPC · JPL
251622	2009 UK_{133}	—	October 21, 2009	Mount Lemmon	Mount Lemmon Survey	·	3.4 km	MPC · JPL
251623	2009 VE_{41}	—	November 9, 2009	Catalina	CSS	PAD	4.3 km	MPC · JPL
251624	2009 XP_{22}	—	December 15, 2009	Mount Lemmon	Mount Lemmon Survey	·	4.0 km	MPC · JPL
251625 Timconrow	2010 DD_{21}	Timconrow	February 17, 2010	WISE	WISE	·	4.1 km	MPC · JPL
251626	2010 FM_{53}	—	March 22, 2010	ESA OGS	ESA OGS	·	4.6 km	MPC · JPL
251627 Joyceearl	2010 JV_{16}	Joyceearl	May 2, 2010	WISE	WISE	·	4.8 km	MPC · JPL
251628	2010 JK_{105}	—	May 12, 2010	WISE	WISE	EUP	6.0 km	MPC · JPL
251629	2010 JR_{125}	—	May 12, 2010	WISE	WISE	·	2.1 km	MPC · JPL
251630	2010 JK_{130}	—	May 13, 2010	WISE	WISE	·	3.1 km	MPC · JPL
251631	2010 KV_{18}	—	May 17, 2010	WISE	WISE	JUN	1.9 km	MPC · JPL
251632	2010 KZ_{29}	—	May 18, 2010	WISE	WISE	·	2.7 km	MPC · JPL
251633 Kivelson	2010 KP_{45}	Kivelson	May 21, 2010	WISE	WISE	·	3.8 km	MPC · JPL
251634	2010 KR_{49}	—	May 22, 2010	WISE	WISE	·	1.6 km	MPC · JPL
251635	2010 KX_{63}	—	May 23, 2010	WISE	WISE	·	1.8 km	MPC · JPL
251636	2010 KH_{65}	—	May 24, 2010	WISE	WISE	THM	4.3 km	MPC · JPL
251637	2010 KN_{68}	—	May 24, 2010	WISE	WISE	·	4.4 km	MPC · JPL
251638 Kianamcfadden	2010 KD_{83}	Kianamcfadden	May 26, 2010	WISE	WISE	·	3.8 km	MPC · JPL
251639	2010 KX_{87}	—	May 26, 2010	WISE	WISE	·	4.6 km	MPC · JPL
251640	2010 KH_{116}	—	May 30, 2010	WISE	WISE	·	5.0 km	MPC · JPL
251641	2010 LX_{79}	—	June 10, 2010	WISE	WISE	EUN	1.7 km	MPC · JPL
251642 Leonardodicaprio	2010 LC_{97}	Leonardodicaprio	June 13, 2010	WISE	WISE	·	5.3 km	MPC · JPL
251643	2010 LA_{135}	—	June 10, 2010	Mount Lemmon	Mount Lemmon Survey	·	860 m	MPC · JPL
251644	2010 MF_{4}	—	June 19, 2010	Mount Lemmon	Mount Lemmon Survey	·	1.6 km	MPC · JPL
251645	2010 NZ_{4}	—	July 6, 2010	Kitt Peak	Spacewatch	·	5.1 km	MPC · JPL
251646	2010 OZ_{126}	—	July 20, 2010	La Sagra	OAM	NYS	1.9 km	MPC · JPL
251647	2834 P-L	—	September 24, 1960	Palomar	C. J. van Houten, I. van Houten-Groeneveld, T. Gehrels	(5)	1.8 km	MPC · JPL
251648	4277 P-L	—	September 24, 1960	Palomar	C. J. van Houten, I. van Houten-Groeneveld, T. Gehrels	(5)	1.2 km	MPC · JPL
251649	1208 T-2	—	September 29, 1973	Palomar	C. J. van Houten, I. van Houten-Groeneveld, T. Gehrels	·	2.3 km	MPC · JPL
251650	2197 T-3	—	October 16, 1977	Palomar	C. J. van Houten, I. van Houten-Groeneveld, T. Gehrels	·	1.5 km	MPC · JPL
251651	2336 T-3	—	October 16, 1977	Palomar	C. J. van Houten, I. van Houten-Groeneveld, T. Gehrels	·	1.4 km	MPC · JPL
251652	1981 EX_{45}	—	March 1, 1981	Siding Spring	S. J. Bus	·	1.1 km	MPC · JPL
251653	1991 TH_{15}	—	October 6, 1991	Palomar	Lowe, A.	·	1.8 km	MPC · JPL
251654	1993 RB_{15}	—	September 15, 1993	Calar Alto	K. Birkle, Boehnhardt, H.	·	4.4 km	MPC · JPL
251655	1993 TH_{11}	—	October 15, 1993	Kitt Peak	Spacewatch	·	750 m	MPC · JPL
251656	1993 UW_{7}	—	October 20, 1993	La Silla	E. W. Elst	(5)	2.0 km	MPC · JPL
251657	1994 AH_{8}	—	January 8, 1994	Kitt Peak	Spacewatch	THM	2.4 km	MPC · JPL
251658	1994 GZ_{1}	—	April 3, 1994	Kitt Peak	Spacewatch	526	2.7 km	MPC · JPL
251659	1994 JU_{6}	—	May 4, 1994	Kitt Peak	Spacewatch	NYS	1.5 km	MPC · JPL
251660	1994 RZ_{8}	—	September 12, 1994	Kitt Peak	Spacewatch	·	1.8 km	MPC · JPL
251661	1994 SY_{2}	—	September 28, 1994	Kitt Peak	Spacewatch	·	1.1 km	MPC · JPL
251662	1994 SK_{5}	—	September 28, 1994	Kitt Peak	Spacewatch	·	2.3 km	MPC · JPL
251663	1994 SP_{11}	—	September 29, 1994	Kitt Peak	Spacewatch	EOS	3.9 km	MPC · JPL
251664	1994 UG_{9}	—	October 28, 1994	Kitt Peak	Spacewatch	EUN	3.2 km	MPC · JPL
251665	1994 YZ_{3}	—	December 31, 1994	Kitt Peak	Spacewatch	·	1.8 km	MPC · JPL
251666	1995 BW_{10}	—	January 29, 1995	Kitt Peak	Spacewatch	·	2.2 km	MPC · JPL
251667	1995 FL_{1}	—	March 23, 1995	Kitt Peak	Spacewatch	·	1.1 km	MPC · JPL
251668	1995 FO_{4}	—	March 23, 1995	Kitt Peak	Spacewatch	·	1.1 km	MPC · JPL
251669	1995 FU_{7}	—	March 25, 1995	Kitt Peak	Spacewatch	·	1.8 km	MPC · JPL
251670	1995 QQ_{14}	—	August 27, 1995	Kitt Peak	Spacewatch	·	1.4 km	MPC · JPL
251671	1995 SJ_{11}	—	September 17, 1995	Kitt Peak	Spacewatch	V	670 m	MPC · JPL
251672	1995 SG_{13}	—	September 18, 1995	Kitt Peak	Spacewatch	·	1.6 km	MPC · JPL
251673	1995 SY_{18}	—	September 18, 1995	Kitt Peak	Spacewatch	·	1.2 km	MPC · JPL
251674	1995 SP_{22}	—	September 19, 1995	Kitt Peak	Spacewatch	KOR	1.4 km	MPC · JPL
251675	1995 SL_{23}	—	September 19, 1995	Kitt Peak	Spacewatch	·	2.0 km	MPC · JPL
251676	1995 SA_{32}	—	September 21, 1995	Kitt Peak	Spacewatch	V	780 m	MPC · JPL
251677	1995 SU_{38}	—	September 24, 1995	Kitt Peak	Spacewatch	KOR	1.5 km	MPC · JPL
251678	1995 SV_{60}	—	September 25, 1995	Kitt Peak	Spacewatch	·	2.2 km	MPC · JPL
251679	1995 TD_{3}	—	October 15, 1995	Kitt Peak	Spacewatch	·	1.5 km	MPC · JPL
251680	1995 TS_{4}	—	October 15, 1995	Kitt Peak	Spacewatch	KOR	1.4 km	MPC · JPL
251681	1995 UW_{17}	—	October 18, 1995	Kitt Peak	Spacewatch	NYS	1.4 km	MPC · JPL
251682	1995 US_{30}	—	October 20, 1995	Kitt Peak	Spacewatch	MAS	950 m	MPC · JPL
251683	1995 UY_{34}	—	October 21, 1995	Kitt Peak	Spacewatch	·	1.5 km	MPC · JPL
251684	1995 UL_{39}	—	October 22, 1995	Kitt Peak	Spacewatch	EOS	4.5 km	MPC · JPL
251685	1995 UC_{40}	—	October 23, 1995	Kitt Peak	Spacewatch	·	1.4 km	MPC · JPL
251686	1995 UF_{42}	—	October 24, 1995	Kitt Peak	Spacewatch	·	1.8 km	MPC · JPL
251687	1995 UR_{50}	—	October 17, 1995	Kitt Peak	Spacewatch	CLA	1.8 km	MPC · JPL
251688	1995 UX_{59}	—	October 19, 1995	Kitt Peak	Spacewatch	MAS	670 m	MPC · JPL
251689	1995 VV_{7}	—	November 14, 1995	Kitt Peak	Spacewatch	MAS	1.0 km	MPC · JPL
251690	1995 VJ_{8}	—	November 14, 1995	Kitt Peak	Spacewatch	EOS	2.3 km	MPC · JPL
251691	1995 VW_{17}	—	November 15, 1995	Kitt Peak	Spacewatch	·	1.6 km	MPC · JPL
251692	1995 WX_{12}	—	November 16, 1995	Kitt Peak	Spacewatch	3:2	5.6 km	MPC · JPL
251693	1995 WB_{15}	—	November 17, 1995	Kitt Peak	Spacewatch	·	2.8 km	MPC · JPL
251694	1995 WP_{27}	—	November 19, 1995	Kitt Peak	Spacewatch	·	1.5 km	MPC · JPL
251695	1995 WC_{33}	—	November 20, 1995	Kitt Peak	Spacewatch	NYS	1.5 km	MPC · JPL
251696	1995 YU_{6}	—	December 16, 1995	Kitt Peak	Spacewatch	·	3.4 km	MPC · JPL
251697	1996 AN_{18}	—	January 13, 1996	Kitt Peak	Spacewatch	·	1.8 km	MPC · JPL
251698	1996 DJ	—	February 18, 1996	Siding Spring	M. Hartley	·	4.1 km	MPC · JPL
251699	1996 FA_{5}	—	March 21, 1996	Socorro	Lincoln Lab ETS	H	530 m	MPC · JPL
251700	1996 RK_{21}	—	September 6, 1996	Kitt Peak	Spacewatch	·	710 m	MPC · JPL

== 251701–251800 ==
back to top

Designation			Discovery			Properties		Ref
Permanent	Provisional	Named after	Date	Site	Discoverer(s)	Category	Diam.	Ref
251701	1996 TD_{16}	—	October 4, 1996	Kitt Peak	Spacewatch	L4	12 km	MPC · JPL
251702	1996 TS_{16}	—	October 4, 1996	Kitt Peak	Spacewatch	L4	12 km	MPC · JPL
251703	1996 TL_{18}	—	October 4, 1996	Kitt Peak	Spacewatch	·	1.6 km	MPC · JPL
251704	1996 TJ_{26}	—	October 7, 1996	Kitt Peak	Spacewatch	·	2.6 km	MPC · JPL
251705	1996 UJ	—	October 17, 1996	Prescott	P. G. Comba	·	1.2 km	MPC · JPL
251706	1996 XZ_{11}	—	December 4, 1996	Kitt Peak	Spacewatch	·	1.7 km	MPC · JPL
251707	1996 XV_{29}	—	December 14, 1996	Kitt Peak	Spacewatch	·	3.0 km	MPC · JPL
251708	1996 XO_{32}	—	December 15, 1996	Saji	Saji	H	920 m	MPC · JPL
251709	1997 AA_{5}	—	January 2, 1997	Chichibu	N. Satō	·	1.5 km	MPC · JPL
251710	1997 CN_{2}	—	February 2, 1997	Kitt Peak	Spacewatch	·	1.5 km	MPC · JPL
251711	1997 CF_{11}	—	February 3, 1997	Kitt Peak	Spacewatch	·	1.1 km	MPC · JPL
251712	1997 CO_{16}	—	February 9, 1997	Kitt Peak	Spacewatch	·	1.1 km	MPC · JPL
251713	1997 ES_{16}	—	March 5, 1997	Kitt Peak	Spacewatch	·	1.8 km	MPC · JPL
251714	1997 GK_{5}	—	April 8, 1997	Kitt Peak	Spacewatch	MAS	860 m	MPC · JPL
251715	1997 GA_{10}	—	April 3, 1997	Socorro	LINEAR	·	5.0 km	MPC · JPL
251716	1997 GR_{10}	—	April 3, 1997	Socorro	LINEAR	TEL	2.1 km	MPC · JPL
251717	1997 HS_{10}	—	April 30, 1997	Socorro	LINEAR	·	1.4 km	MPC · JPL
251718	1997 SV_{18}	—	September 28, 1997	Kitt Peak	Spacewatch	·	1.3 km	MPC · JPL
251719	1997 ST_{20}	—	September 28, 1997	Kitt Peak	Spacewatch	EUN	1.7 km	MPC · JPL
251720	1997 SE_{32}	—	September 25, 1997	Bergisch Gladbach	W. Bickel	·	1.2 km	MPC · JPL
251721	1997 UO	—	October 19, 1997	Kleť	Kleť	(194)	2.1 km	MPC · JPL
251722	1997 US_{2}	—	October 23, 1997	Kitt Peak	Spacewatch	APO · PHA	380 m	MPC · JPL
251723	1997 WZ_{3}	—	November 20, 1997	Kitt Peak	Spacewatch	·	1.9 km	MPC · JPL
251724	1997 WR_{25}	—	November 20, 1997	Kitt Peak	Spacewatch	·	2.4 km	MPC · JPL
251725	1998 BV_{19}	—	January 22, 1998	Kitt Peak	Spacewatch	·	3.1 km	MPC · JPL
251726	1998 DD_{1}	—	February 18, 1998	Kleť	Kleť	·	2.7 km	MPC · JPL
251727	1998 FJ_{38}	—	March 20, 1998	Socorro	LINEAR	·	1.1 km	MPC · JPL
251728	1998 FA_{47}	—	March 20, 1998	Socorro	LINEAR	·	1.3 km	MPC · JPL
251729	1998 FN_{67}	—	March 20, 1998	Socorro	LINEAR	·	2.9 km	MPC · JPL
251730	1998 HG_{12}	—	April 19, 1998	Kitt Peak	Spacewatch	·	1.5 km	MPC · JPL
251731	1998 HY_{24}	—	April 17, 1998	Kitt Peak	Spacewatch	·	1.4 km	MPC · JPL
251732	1998 HG_{49}	—	April 27, 1998	Kitt Peak	Spacewatch	AMO	160 m	MPC · JPL
251733	1998 HO_{86}	—	April 21, 1998	Socorro	LINEAR	·	4.9 km	MPC · JPL
251734	1998 KB_{12}	—	May 27, 1998	Kitt Peak	Spacewatch	H	600 m	MPC · JPL
251735	1998 MO_{4}	—	June 17, 1998	Kitt Peak	Spacewatch	·	5.8 km	MPC · JPL
251736	1998 MR_{16}	—	June 27, 1998	Kitt Peak	Spacewatch	·	4.4 km	MPC · JPL
251737	1998 QK_{62}	—	August 26, 1998	Xinglong	SCAP	·	1.4 km	MPC · JPL
251738	1998 QU_{87}	—	August 24, 1998	Socorro	LINEAR	TIR	5.4 km	MPC · JPL
251739	1998 SH_{29}	—	September 18, 1998	Kitt Peak	Spacewatch	·	4.8 km	MPC · JPL
251740	1998 TG_{33}	—	October 14, 1998	Anderson Mesa	LONEOS	·	2.6 km	MPC · JPL
251741	1998 UQ_{11}	—	October 17, 1998	Kitt Peak	Spacewatch	MAS	1.2 km	MPC · JPL
251742	1998 VD_{57}	—	November 14, 1998	Kitt Peak	Spacewatch	L4	10 km	MPC · JPL
251743	1998 WO_{24}	—	November 18, 1998	Kitt Peak	M. W. Buie	L4	9.3 km	MPC · JPL
251744	1998 WS_{24}	—	November 19, 1998	Kitt Peak	M. W. Buie	L4	9.0 km	MPC · JPL
251745	1998 WK_{36}	—	November 19, 1998	Kitt Peak	Spacewatch	·	2.1 km	MPC · JPL
251746	1998 WL_{43}	—	November 22, 1998	Kitt Peak	Spacewatch	·	1.5 km	MPC · JPL
251747	1998 XJ_{2}	—	December 8, 1998	Kitt Peak	Spacewatch	·	1.4 km	MPC · JPL
251748	1998 XC_{11}	—	December 15, 1998	Caussols	ODAS	·	3.5 km	MPC · JPL
251749	1998 XR_{49}	—	December 14, 1998	Socorro	LINEAR	·	3.0 km	MPC · JPL
251750	1998 YN_{21}	—	December 26, 1998	Kitt Peak	Spacewatch	·	1.7 km	MPC · JPL
251751	1999 AX_{12}	—	January 7, 1999	Kitt Peak	Spacewatch	·	1.9 km	MPC · JPL
251752	1999 AP_{13}	—	January 7, 1999	Kitt Peak	Spacewatch	·	1.9 km	MPC · JPL
251753	1999 AX_{14}	—	January 8, 1999	Kitt Peak	Spacewatch	(5)	1.7 km	MPC · JPL
251754	1999 AA_{17}	—	January 11, 1999	Kitt Peak	Spacewatch	·	2.3 km	MPC · JPL
251755	1999 CG_{34}	—	February 10, 1999	Socorro	LINEAR	·	2.3 km	MPC · JPL
251756	1999 CU_{90}	—	February 10, 1999	Socorro	LINEAR	·	2.3 km	MPC · JPL
251757	1999 CL_{107}	—	February 12, 1999	Socorro	LINEAR	·	2.0 km	MPC · JPL
251758	1999 CL_{115}	—	February 12, 1999	Socorro	LINEAR	·	3.0 km	MPC · JPL
251759	1999 CE_{145}	—	February 8, 1999	Kitt Peak	Spacewatch	·	2.2 km	MPC · JPL
251760	1999 FO_{2}	—	March 16, 1999	Kitt Peak	Spacewatch	·	1.8 km	MPC · JPL
251761	1999 FN_{6}	—	March 17, 1999	Caussols	ODAS	·	3.3 km	MPC · JPL
251762	1999 FS_{12}	—	March 18, 1999	Kitt Peak	Spacewatch	·	2.1 km	MPC · JPL
251763	1999 FX_{16}	—	March 23, 1999	Kitt Peak	Spacewatch	·	2.3 km	MPC · JPL
251764	1999 GV_{61}	—	April 9, 1999	Anderson Mesa	LONEOS	·	1.1 km	MPC · JPL
251765	1999 JS_{4}	—	May 10, 1999	Socorro	LINEAR	·	3.0 km	MPC · JPL
251766	1999 JC_{5}	—	May 10, 1999	Socorro	LINEAR	H	850 m	MPC · JPL
251767	1999 JK_{75}	—	May 13, 1999	Socorro	LINEAR	·	1.5 km	MPC · JPL
251768	1999 JF_{98}	—	May 12, 1999	Socorro	LINEAR	·	1.0 km	MPC · JPL
251769	1999 NP_{1}	—	July 12, 1999	Socorro	LINEAR	PHO	3.9 km	MPC · JPL
251770	1999 NM_{7}	—	July 13, 1999	Socorro	LINEAR	·	5.4 km	MPC · JPL
251771	1999 RP_{2}	—	September 6, 1999	Catalina	CSS	·	3.6 km	MPC · JPL
251772	1999 RL_{5}	—	September 3, 1999	Kitt Peak	Spacewatch	·	2.4 km	MPC · JPL
251773	1999 RF_{7}	—	September 3, 1999	Kitt Peak	Spacewatch	·	3.0 km	MPC · JPL
251774	1999 RG_{10}	—	September 7, 1999	Socorro	LINEAR	·	2.6 km	MPC · JPL
251775	1999 RQ_{12}	—	September 7, 1999	Socorro	LINEAR	·	1.4 km	MPC · JPL
251776	1999 RZ_{21}	—	September 7, 1999	Socorro	LINEAR	·	1.4 km	MPC · JPL
251777	1999 RC_{67}	—	September 7, 1999	Socorro	LINEAR	·	1.4 km	MPC · JPL
251778	1999 RM_{69}	—	September 7, 1999	Socorro	LINEAR	NYS	1.6 km	MPC · JPL
251779	1999 RL_{70}	—	September 7, 1999	Socorro	LINEAR	·	2.9 km	MPC · JPL
251780	1999 RV_{82}	—	September 7, 1999	Socorro	LINEAR	·	1.9 km	MPC · JPL
251781	1999 RL_{106}	—	September 8, 1999	Socorro	LINEAR	·	1.3 km	MPC · JPL
251782	1999 RQ_{147}	—	September 9, 1999	Socorro	LINEAR	EUP	5.3 km	MPC · JPL
251783	1999 RD_{148}	—	September 9, 1999	Socorro	LINEAR	·	1.3 km	MPC · JPL
251784	1999 RN_{185}	—	September 9, 1999	Socorro	LINEAR	V	830 m	MPC · JPL
251785	1999 RP_{186}	—	September 9, 1999	Socorro	LINEAR	·	3.0 km	MPC · JPL
251786	1999 RB_{207}	—	September 8, 1999	Socorro	LINEAR	·	5.0 km	MPC · JPL
251787	1999 RP_{208}	—	September 8, 1999	Socorro	LINEAR	·	1.7 km	MPC · JPL
251788	1999 RM_{212}	—	September 8, 1999	Socorro	LINEAR	·	1.5 km	MPC · JPL
251789	1999 RZ_{222}	—	September 7, 1999	Catalina	CSS	V	950 m	MPC · JPL
251790	1999 RM_{228}	—	September 8, 1999	Catalina	CSS	·	1.4 km	MPC · JPL
251791	1999 SA_{12}	—	September 30, 1999	Catalina	CSS	·	3.3 km	MPC · JPL
251792	1999 SY_{20}	—	September 30, 1999	Kitt Peak	Spacewatch	·	1.2 km	MPC · JPL
251793	1999 SD_{23}	—	September 30, 1999	Kitt Peak	Spacewatch	·	1.5 km	MPC · JPL
251794	1999 SL_{23}	—	September 30, 1999	Kitt Peak	Spacewatch	·	1.4 km	MPC · JPL
251795	1999 TU_{2}	—	October 2, 1999	Kitt Peak	Spacewatch	·	1.7 km	MPC · JPL
251796	1999 TO_{9}	—	October 8, 1999	Višnjan	K. Korlević, M. Jurić	ERI	3.1 km	MPC · JPL
251797	1999 TS_{21}	—	October 2, 1999	Kitt Peak	Spacewatch	·	3.9 km	MPC · JPL
251798	1999 TG_{35}	—	October 4, 1999	Socorro	LINEAR	H	820 m	MPC · JPL
251799	1999 TK_{36}	—	October 12, 1999	Anderson Mesa	LONEOS	·	3.0 km	MPC · JPL
251800	1999 TY_{37}	—	October 1, 1999	Catalina	CSS	·	3.6 km	MPC · JPL

== 251801–251900 ==
back to top

Designation			Discovery			Properties		Ref
Permanent	Provisional	Named after	Date	Site	Discoverer(s)	Category	Diam.	Ref
251801	1999 TL_{48}	—	October 4, 1999	Kitt Peak	Spacewatch	·	3.8 km	MPC · JPL
251802	1999 TQ_{51}	—	October 4, 1999	Kitt Peak	Spacewatch	VER	2.9 km	MPC · JPL
251803	1999 TV_{51}	—	October 4, 1999	Kitt Peak	Spacewatch	·	4.4 km	MPC · JPL
251804	1999 TY_{53}	—	October 6, 1999	Kitt Peak	Spacewatch	TIR	3.3 km	MPC · JPL
251805	1999 TT_{54}	—	October 6, 1999	Kitt Peak	Spacewatch	·	4.2 km	MPC · JPL
251806	1999 TO_{59}	—	October 7, 1999	Kitt Peak	Spacewatch	·	1.3 km	MPC · JPL
251807	1999 TK_{60}	—	October 7, 1999	Kitt Peak	Spacewatch	·	1.3 km	MPC · JPL
251808	1999 TD_{61}	—	October 7, 1999	Kitt Peak	Spacewatch	EOS	2.0 km	MPC · JPL
251809	1999 TS_{62}	—	October 7, 1999	Kitt Peak	Spacewatch	LIX	4.6 km	MPC · JPL
251810	1999 TR_{66}	—	October 8, 1999	Kitt Peak	Spacewatch	·	1.2 km	MPC · JPL
251811	1999 TP_{73}	—	October 10, 1999	Kitt Peak	Spacewatch	MAS	860 m	MPC · JPL
251812	1999 TF_{76}	—	October 10, 1999	Kitt Peak	Spacewatch	THM	2.6 km	MPC · JPL
251813	1999 TY_{76}	—	October 10, 1999	Kitt Peak	Spacewatch	NYS	1.3 km	MPC · JPL
251814	1999 TC_{77}	—	October 10, 1999	Kitt Peak	Spacewatch	NYS	1.1 km	MPC · JPL
251815	1999 TP_{79}	—	October 11, 1999	Kitt Peak	Spacewatch	·	1.5 km	MPC · JPL
251816	1999 TO_{81}	—	October 12, 1999	Kitt Peak	Spacewatch	·	850 m	MPC · JPL
251817	1999 TG_{94}	—	October 2, 1999	Socorro	LINEAR	NYS	1.3 km	MPC · JPL
251818	1999 TY_{109}	—	October 4, 1999	Socorro	LINEAR	·	1.5 km	MPC · JPL
251819	1999 TP_{135}	—	October 6, 1999	Socorro	LINEAR	·	1.4 km	MPC · JPL
251820	1999 TD_{145}	—	October 7, 1999	Socorro	LINEAR	·	3.8 km	MPC · JPL
251821	1999 TY_{161}	—	October 9, 1999	Socorro	LINEAR	·	1.6 km	MPC · JPL
251822	1999 TQ_{164}	—	October 10, 1999	Socorro	LINEAR	·	1.6 km	MPC · JPL
251823	1999 TS_{164}	—	October 10, 1999	Socorro	LINEAR	·	1.6 km	MPC · JPL
251824	1999 TJ_{177}	—	October 10, 1999	Socorro	LINEAR	MAS	780 m	MPC · JPL
251825	1999 TH_{179}	—	October 10, 1999	Socorro	LINEAR	·	3.7 km	MPC · JPL
251826	1999 TK_{179}	—	October 10, 1999	Socorro	LINEAR	·	1.6 km	MPC · JPL
251827	1999 TS_{192}	—	October 12, 1999	Socorro	LINEAR	·	3.8 km	MPC · JPL
251828	1999 TE_{195}	—	October 12, 1999	Socorro	LINEAR	·	2.3 km	MPC · JPL
251829	1999 TJ_{196}	—	October 12, 1999	Socorro	LINEAR	·	1.8 km	MPC · JPL
251830	1999 TY_{198}	—	October 12, 1999	Socorro	LINEAR	·	4.9 km	MPC · JPL
251831	1999 TS_{202}	—	October 13, 1999	Socorro	LINEAR	·	3.4 km	MPC · JPL
251832	1999 TW_{209}	—	October 14, 1999	Socorro	LINEAR	·	2.8 km	MPC · JPL
251833	1999 TE_{212}	—	October 15, 1999	Socorro	LINEAR	·	1.4 km	MPC · JPL
251834	1999 TD_{213}	—	October 15, 1999	Socorro	LINEAR	·	1.5 km	MPC · JPL
251835	1999 TB_{214}	—	October 15, 1999	Socorro	LINEAR	·	5.3 km	MPC · JPL
251836	1999 TR_{214}	—	October 15, 1999	Socorro	LINEAR	·	4.1 km	MPC · JPL
251837	1999 TS_{217}	—	October 15, 1999	Socorro	LINEAR	·	1.0 km	MPC · JPL
251838	1999 TV_{246}	—	October 6, 1999	Socorro	LINEAR	·	3.0 km	MPC · JPL
251839	1999 TB_{250}	—	October 9, 1999	Catalina	CSS	·	1.6 km	MPC · JPL
251840	1999 TS_{255}	—	October 9, 1999	Kitt Peak	Spacewatch	·	890 m	MPC · JPL
251841	1999 TL_{259}	—	October 9, 1999	Socorro	LINEAR	MAS	870 m	MPC · JPL
251842	1999 TE_{262}	—	October 13, 1999	Socorro	LINEAR	VER	3.2 km	MPC · JPL
251843	1999 TY_{263}	—	October 15, 1999	Kitt Peak	Spacewatch	·	3.0 km	MPC · JPL
251844	1999 TV_{267}	—	October 3, 1999	Socorro	LINEAR	·	4.4 km	MPC · JPL
251845	1999 TX_{271}	—	October 3, 1999	Socorro	LINEAR	·	3.3 km	MPC · JPL
251846	1999 TJ_{294}	—	October 1, 1999	Kitt Peak	Spacewatch	EOS	2.5 km	MPC · JPL
251847	1999 TD_{298}	—	October 1, 1999	Catalina	CSS	V	890 m	MPC · JPL
251848	1999 TB_{306}	—	October 6, 1999	Socorro	LINEAR	EOS	2.6 km	MPC · JPL
251849	1999 TA_{312}	—	October 8, 1999	Kitt Peak	Spacewatch	·	2.9 km	MPC · JPL
251850	1999 TN_{321}	—	October 12, 1999	Socorro	LINEAR	EOS	2.7 km	MPC · JPL
251851	1999 TG_{333}	—	October 13, 1999	Apache Point	SDSS	·	2.8 km	MPC · JPL
251852	1999 UD_{10}	—	October 31, 1999	Socorro	LINEAR	H	920 m	MPC · JPL
251853	1999 UW_{14}	—	October 29, 1999	Catalina	CSS	·	1.4 km	MPC · JPL
251854	1999 UB_{21}	—	October 31, 1999	Kitt Peak	Spacewatch	·	2.9 km	MPC · JPL
251855	1999 UX_{22}	—	October 31, 1999	Kitt Peak	Spacewatch	·	2.9 km	MPC · JPL
251856	1999 UA_{30}	—	October 31, 1999	Kitt Peak	Spacewatch	THM	3.0 km	MPC · JPL
251857	1999 UT_{31}	—	October 31, 1999	Kitt Peak	Spacewatch	THM	2.2 km	MPC · JPL
251858	1999 UW_{31}	—	October 31, 1999	Kitt Peak	Spacewatch	MAS	1.0 km	MPC · JPL
251859	1999 UG_{32}	—	October 31, 1999	Kitt Peak	Spacewatch	·	4.7 km	MPC · JPL
251860	1999 UL_{34}	—	October 31, 1999	Kitt Peak	Spacewatch	THM	2.9 km	MPC · JPL
251861	1999 UW_{39}	—	October 31, 1999	Kitt Peak	Spacewatch	NYS	1.2 km	MPC · JPL
251862	1999 UO_{40}	—	October 16, 1999	Socorro	LINEAR	·	1.5 km	MPC · JPL
251863	1999 UL_{53}	—	October 19, 1999	Kitt Peak	Spacewatch	·	860 m	MPC · JPL
251864	1999 UX_{58}	—	October 30, 1999	Socorro	LINEAR	·	4.2 km	MPC · JPL
251865	1999 VY_{12}	—	November 1, 1999	Socorro	LINEAR	H	1.0 km	MPC · JPL
251866	1999 VY_{13}	—	November 2, 1999	Socorro	LINEAR	H	970 m	MPC · JPL
251867	1999 VV_{16}	—	November 2, 1999	Kitt Peak	Spacewatch	·	1.4 km	MPC · JPL
251868	1999 VL_{17}	—	November 2, 1999	Kitt Peak	Spacewatch	·	1.6 km	MPC · JPL
251869	1999 VO_{17}	—	November 2, 1999	Kitt Peak	Spacewatch	·	1.6 km	MPC · JPL
251870	1999 VB_{18}	—	November 2, 1999	Kitt Peak	Spacewatch	V	720 m	MPC · JPL
251871	1999 VE_{18}	—	November 2, 1999	Kitt Peak	Spacewatch	·	4.5 km	MPC · JPL
251872	1999 VP_{18}	—	November 2, 1999	Kitt Peak	Spacewatch	·	1.2 km	MPC · JPL
251873	1999 VM_{31}	—	November 3, 1999	Socorro	LINEAR	·	1.7 km	MPC · JPL
251874	1999 VV_{42}	—	November 4, 1999	Kitt Peak	Spacewatch	NYS	950 m	MPC · JPL
251875	1999 VQ_{44}	—	November 4, 1999	Catalina	CSS	V	890 m	MPC · JPL
251876	1999 VK_{46}	—	November 3, 1999	Socorro	LINEAR	T_{j} (2.99) · EUP	4.9 km	MPC · JPL
251877	1999 VE_{52}	—	November 3, 1999	Socorro	LINEAR	·	3.9 km	MPC · JPL
251878	1999 VE_{54}	—	November 4, 1999	Socorro	LINEAR	·	4.3 km	MPC · JPL
251879	1999 VW_{59}	—	November 4, 1999	Socorro	LINEAR	NYS	1.1 km	MPC · JPL
251880	1999 VM_{70}	—	November 4, 1999	Socorro	LINEAR	·	1.7 km	MPC · JPL
251881	1999 VN_{71}	—	November 4, 1999	Socorro	LINEAR	·	4.2 km	MPC · JPL
251882	1999 VU_{73}	—	November 1, 1999	Kitt Peak	Spacewatch	NYS	1.1 km	MPC · JPL
251883	1999 VB_{76}	—	November 5, 1999	Kitt Peak	Spacewatch	MAS	880 m	MPC · JPL
251884	1999 VF_{77}	—	November 5, 1999	Kitt Peak	Spacewatch	MAS	710 m	MPC · JPL
251885	1999 VT_{79}	—	November 4, 1999	Socorro	LINEAR	H	700 m	MPC · JPL
251886	1999 VV_{86}	—	November 7, 1999	Socorro	LINEAR	·	4.5 km	MPC · JPL
251887	1999 VT_{89}	—	November 5, 1999	Socorro	LINEAR	·	1.3 km	MPC · JPL
251888	1999 VK_{94}	—	November 9, 1999	Socorro	LINEAR	·	3.3 km	MPC · JPL
251889	1999 VR_{94}	—	November 9, 1999	Socorro	LINEAR	TIR	4.0 km	MPC · JPL
251890	1999 VE_{96}	—	November 9, 1999	Socorro	LINEAR	·	1.3 km	MPC · JPL
251891	1999 VZ_{101}	—	November 9, 1999	Socorro	LINEAR	·	4.1 km	MPC · JPL
251892	1999 VT_{103}	—	November 9, 1999	Socorro	LINEAR	THM	2.4 km	MPC · JPL
251893	1999 VG_{105}	—	November 9, 1999	Socorro	LINEAR	·	1.5 km	MPC · JPL
251894	1999 VO_{107}	—	November 9, 1999	Socorro	LINEAR	VER	4.0 km	MPC · JPL
251895	1999 VL_{108}	—	November 9, 1999	Socorro	LINEAR	·	3.4 km	MPC · JPL
251896	1999 VG_{111}	—	November 9, 1999	Socorro	LINEAR	·	7.5 km	MPC · JPL
251897	1999 VG_{112}	—	November 9, 1999	Socorro	LINEAR	·	5.0 km	MPC · JPL
251898	1999 VQ_{112}	—	November 9, 1999	Socorro	LINEAR	·	5.3 km	MPC · JPL
251899	1999 VE_{120}	—	November 4, 1999	Kitt Peak	Spacewatch	·	2.7 km	MPC · JPL
251900	1999 VV_{120}	—	November 4, 1999	Kitt Peak	Spacewatch	·	4.6 km	MPC · JPL

== 251901–252000 ==
back to top

Designation			Discovery			Properties		Ref
Permanent	Provisional	Named after	Date	Site	Discoverer(s)	Category	Diam.	Ref
251901	1999 VY_{120}	—	November 4, 1999	Kitt Peak	Spacewatch	·	1.5 km	MPC · JPL
251902	1999 VV_{121}	—	November 4, 1999	Kitt Peak	Spacewatch	·	1.2 km	MPC · JPL
251903	1999 VF_{122}	—	November 4, 1999	Kitt Peak	Spacewatch	·	3.0 km	MPC · JPL
251904	1999 VY_{122}	—	November 5, 1999	Kitt Peak	Spacewatch	·	4.1 km	MPC · JPL
251905	1999 VV_{133}	—	November 10, 1999	Kitt Peak	Spacewatch	EOS	2.8 km	MPC · JPL
251906	1999 VX_{134}	—	November 10, 1999	Kitt Peak	Spacewatch	·	1.4 km	MPC · JPL
251907	1999 VB_{137}	—	November 12, 1999	Socorro	LINEAR	EOS	3.0 km	MPC · JPL
251908	1999 VU_{141}	—	November 10, 1999	Kitt Peak	Spacewatch	·	1.4 km	MPC · JPL
251909	1999 VE_{143}	—	November 14, 1999	Kitt Peak	Spacewatch	PHO	1.0 km	MPC · JPL
251910	1999 VG_{147}	—	November 12, 1999	Socorro	LINEAR	·	4.2 km	MPC · JPL
251911	1999 VT_{147}	—	November 14, 1999	Socorro	LINEAR	·	3.8 km	MPC · JPL
251912	1999 VV_{147}	—	November 14, 1999	Socorro	LINEAR	·	3.1 km	MPC · JPL
251913	1999 VJ_{153}	—	November 11, 1999	Kitt Peak	Spacewatch	·	3.5 km	MPC · JPL
251914	1999 VQ_{154}	—	November 12, 1999	Kitt Peak	Spacewatch	MAS	880 m	MPC · JPL
251915	1999 VJ_{155}	—	November 15, 1999	Kitt Peak	Spacewatch	·	3.2 km	MPC · JPL
251916	1999 VO_{155}	—	November 9, 1999	Socorro	LINEAR	NYS	1.7 km	MPC · JPL
251917	1999 VR_{156}	—	November 12, 1999	Socorro	LINEAR	V	750 m	MPC · JPL
251918	1999 VV_{158}	—	November 14, 1999	Socorro	LINEAR	PHO	2.2 km	MPC · JPL
251919	1999 VQ_{163}	—	November 14, 1999	Socorro	LINEAR	·	4.3 km	MPC · JPL
251920	1999 VR_{165}	—	November 14, 1999	Socorro	LINEAR	·	6.2 km	MPC · JPL
251921	1999 VR_{179}	—	November 6, 1999	Socorro	LINEAR	T_{j} (2.98)	6.2 km	MPC · JPL
251922	1999 VH_{193}	—	November 1, 1999	Catalina	CSS	·	6.8 km	MPC · JPL
251923	1999 VO_{195}	—	November 3, 1999	Catalina	CSS	·	1.6 km	MPC · JPL
251924	1999 VT_{195}	—	November 3, 1999	Anderson Mesa	LONEOS	NYS	1.0 km	MPC · JPL
251925	1999 VW_{204}	—	November 10, 1999	Kitt Peak	Spacewatch	·	3.5 km	MPC · JPL
251926	1999 VZ_{204}	—	November 10, 1999	Kitt Peak	Spacewatch	·	4.1 km	MPC · JPL
251927	1999 VE_{206}	—	November 12, 1999	Socorro	LINEAR	·	1.8 km	MPC · JPL
251928	1999 VO_{206}	—	November 9, 1999	Catalina	CSS	·	4.5 km	MPC · JPL
251929	1999 VE_{209}	—	November 14, 1999	Socorro	LINEAR	MAS	1.0 km	MPC · JPL
251930	1999 VA_{210}	—	November 12, 1999	Socorro	LINEAR	·	2.2 km	MPC · JPL
251931	1999 VQ_{210}	—	November 13, 1999	Catalina	CSS	·	3.9 km	MPC · JPL
251932	1999 VW_{210}	—	November 13, 1999	Catalina	CSS	HYG	4.3 km	MPC · JPL
251933	1999 VS_{216}	—	November 1, 1999	Kitt Peak	Spacewatch	·	1.1 km	MPC · JPL
251934	1999 VN_{217}	—	November 5, 1999	Socorro	LINEAR	EUP	5.4 km	MPC · JPL
251935	1999 VR_{219}	—	November 5, 1999	Kitt Peak	Spacewatch	V	940 m	MPC · JPL
251936	1999 VM_{225}	—	November 5, 1999	Socorro	LINEAR	H	740 m	MPC · JPL
251937	1999 WN_{8}	—	November 29, 1999	Monte Agliale	S. Donati	·	5.0 km	MPC · JPL
251938	1999 WD_{11}	—	November 30, 1999	Kitt Peak	Spacewatch	THM	3.2 km	MPC · JPL
251939	1999 WG_{14}	—	November 28, 1999	Kitt Peak	Spacewatch	·	1.2 km	MPC · JPL
251940	1999 WT_{15}	—	November 29, 1999	Kitt Peak	Spacewatch	NYS	1.1 km	MPC · JPL
251941	1999 WT_{18}	—	November 30, 1999	Kitt Peak	Spacewatch	MAS	760 m	MPC · JPL
251942	1999 WR_{25}	—	November 29, 1999	Kitt Peak	Spacewatch	NYS	1.3 km	MPC · JPL
251943	1999 XY_{8}	—	December 5, 1999	Socorro	LINEAR	H	870 m	MPC · JPL
251944	1999 XR_{23}	—	December 6, 1999	Socorro	LINEAR	·	3.8 km	MPC · JPL
251945	1999 XX_{44}	—	December 7, 1999	Socorro	LINEAR	·	1.4 km	MPC · JPL
251946	1999 XV_{56}	—	December 7, 1999	Socorro	LINEAR	·	4.4 km	MPC · JPL
251947	1999 XG_{62}	—	December 7, 1999	Socorro	LINEAR	·	1.9 km	MPC · JPL
251948	1999 XA_{65}	—	December 7, 1999	Socorro	LINEAR	·	6.7 km	MPC · JPL
251949	1999 XL_{66}	—	December 7, 1999	Socorro	LINEAR	·	5.5 km	MPC · JPL
251950	1999 XL_{79}	—	December 7, 1999	Socorro	LINEAR	·	1.7 km	MPC · JPL
251951	1999 XE_{80}	—	December 7, 1999	Socorro	LINEAR	NYS	1.6 km	MPC · JPL
251952	1999 XM_{91}	—	December 7, 1999	Socorro	LINEAR	·	4.6 km	MPC · JPL
251953	1999 XX_{94}	—	December 7, 1999	Socorro	LINEAR	·	5.5 km	MPC · JPL
251954	1999 XV_{106}	—	December 4, 1999	Catalina	CSS	·	1.4 km	MPC · JPL
251955	1999 XR_{129}	—	December 12, 1999	Socorro	LINEAR	·	8.0 km	MPC · JPL
251956	1999 XC_{145}	—	December 7, 1999	Kitt Peak	Spacewatch	·	5.3 km	MPC · JPL
251957	1999 XN_{228}	—	December 14, 1999	Kitt Peak	Spacewatch	·	4.1 km	MPC · JPL
251958	1999 XL_{241}	—	December 8, 1999	Socorro	LINEAR	THM	2.9 km	MPC · JPL
251959	1999 XL_{243}	—	December 3, 1999	Kitt Peak	Spacewatch	·	3.7 km	MPC · JPL
251960	1999 XO_{247}	—	December 6, 1999	Kitt Peak	Spacewatch	·	1.5 km	MPC · JPL
251961	1999 XV_{254}	—	December 12, 1999	Kitt Peak	Spacewatch	·	1.5 km	MPC · JPL
251962	1999 XT_{258}	—	December 5, 1999	Kitt Peak	Spacewatch	·	1.8 km	MPC · JPL
251963	1999 XH_{261}	—	December 5, 1999	Anderson Mesa	LONEOS	·	4.1 km	MPC · JPL
251964	1999 YL_{6}	—	December 30, 1999	Socorro	LINEAR	·	1.3 km	MPC · JPL
251965	1999 YD_{7}	—	December 30, 1999	Socorro	LINEAR	T_{j} (2.99)	5.3 km	MPC · JPL
251966	2000 AJ_{1}	—	January 2, 2000	Socorro	LINEAR	·	2.9 km	MPC · JPL
251967	2000 AY_{44}	—	January 5, 2000	Kitt Peak	Spacewatch	·	1.4 km	MPC · JPL
251968	2000 AK_{73}	—	January 5, 2000	Socorro	LINEAR	·	5.3 km	MPC · JPL
251969	2000 AV_{89}	—	January 5, 2000	Socorro	LINEAR	·	6.5 km	MPC · JPL
251970	2000 AQ_{92}	—	January 2, 2000	Socorro	LINEAR	PHO	1.7 km	MPC · JPL
251971	2000 AN_{150}	—	January 8, 2000	Socorro	LINEAR	T_{j} (2.99) · CYB	7.9 km	MPC · JPL
251972	2000 AW_{157}	—	January 3, 2000	Socorro	LINEAR	·	1.6 km	MPC · JPL
251973	2000 AQ_{170}	—	January 7, 2000	Socorro	LINEAR	THB	4.5 km	MPC · JPL
251974	2000 AR_{216}	—	January 8, 2000	Kitt Peak	Spacewatch	MAS	810 m	MPC · JPL
251975	2000 AG_{218}	—	January 8, 2000	Kitt Peak	Spacewatch	THM	2.7 km	MPC · JPL
251976	2000 AB_{223}	—	January 9, 2000	Kitt Peak	Spacewatch	·	4.1 km	MPC · JPL
251977	2000 AG_{226}	—	January 12, 2000	Kitt Peak	Spacewatch	BRG	2.1 km	MPC · JPL
251978	2000 AR_{240}	—	January 7, 2000	Socorro	LINEAR	·	2.4 km	MPC · JPL
251979	2000 AU_{244}	—	January 8, 2000	Socorro	LINEAR	·	1.7 km	MPC · JPL
251980	2000 BE	—	January 16, 2000	Višnjan	K. Korlević	RAF	1.6 km	MPC · JPL
251981	2000 CC_{57}	—	February 5, 2000	Socorro	LINEAR	·	1.6 km	MPC · JPL
251982	2000 CP_{64}	—	February 3, 2000	Socorro	LINEAR	NYS	1.8 km	MPC · JPL
251983	2000 CR_{100}	—	February 10, 2000	Kitt Peak	Spacewatch	·	1.3 km	MPC · JPL
251984	2000 CK_{131}	—	February 3, 2000	Kitt Peak	Spacewatch	·	1.6 km	MPC · JPL
251985	2000 DW_{10}	—	February 26, 2000	Kitt Peak	Spacewatch	·	1.1 km	MPC · JPL
251986	2000 DR_{11}	—	February 27, 2000	Kitt Peak	Spacewatch	·	1.7 km	MPC · JPL
251987	2000 DS_{11}	—	February 27, 2000	Kitt Peak	Spacewatch	·	1.7 km	MPC · JPL
251988	2000 DQ_{76}	—	February 29, 2000	Socorro	LINEAR	EUN	1.8 km	MPC · JPL
251989	2000 DY_{109}	—	February 29, 2000	Socorro	LINEAR	·	2.1 km	MPC · JPL
251990	2000 ER_{25}	—	March 8, 2000	Kitt Peak	Spacewatch	·	1.8 km	MPC · JPL
251991	2000 ET_{52}	—	March 3, 2000	Kitt Peak	Spacewatch	·	2.0 km	MPC · JPL
251992	2000 EO_{53}	—	March 8, 2000	Kitt Peak	Spacewatch	·	1.7 km	MPC · JPL
251993	2000 EX_{66}	—	March 10, 2000	Socorro	LINEAR	·	2.4 km	MPC · JPL
251994	2000 EO_{98}	—	March 9, 2000	Kitt Peak	Spacewatch	·	1.6 km	MPC · JPL
251995	2000 EQ_{98}	—	March 9, 2000	Kitt Peak	Spacewatch	·	1.4 km	MPC · JPL
251996	2000 EY_{114}	—	March 10, 2000	Kitt Peak	Spacewatch	·	1.7 km	MPC · JPL
251997	2000 EG_{115}	—	March 10, 2000	Kitt Peak	Spacewatch	·	2.4 km	MPC · JPL
251998	2000 EY_{125}	—	March 11, 2000	Anderson Mesa	LONEOS	·	2.6 km	MPC · JPL
251999	2000 EN_{126}	—	March 11, 2000	Anderson Mesa	LONEOS	(5)	1.5 km	MPC · JPL
252000	2000 EK_{136}	—	March 12, 2000	Catalina	CSS	·	2.3 km	MPC · JPL

back to top

== See also ==
- Meanings of minor-planet names: 251001–252000
