= (225312) 1996 XB27 =

Bright mini-asteroid

(225312) 1996 XB_{27}
Discovery
- Discovered by: Spacewatch
- Discovery site: Kitt Peak National Obs.
- Discovery date: 12 December 1996

Designations
- Alternative designations: 2001 DJ_{47}
- Minor planet category: Amor; NEO

Orbital characteristics
- Epoch 4 September 2017 (JD 2458000.5)
- Uncertainty parameter 0
- Observation arc: 17.62 yr (6,437 days)
- Aphelion: 1.2579 AU
- Perihelion: 1.1201 AU
- Semi-major axis: 1.1890 AU
- Eccentricity: 0.0579
- Orbital period (sidereal): 1.30 yr (474 days)
- Mean anomaly: 195.38°
- Mean motion: 0° 45^{m} 36.72^{s} / day
- Inclination: 2.4647°
- Longitude of ascending node: 179.42°
- Argument of perihelion: 58.279°
- Earth MOID: 0.1159 AU (45.2 LD)

Physical characteristics
- Mean diameter: 0.084 km
- Geometric albedo: 0.48
- Absolute magnitude (H): 21.7

(225312) 1996 XB_{27} is a bright mini-asteroid, classified as near-Earth object of the Amor group, approximately 84 meters in diameter. It was discovered on 12 December 1996, by astronomers of the Spacewatch program at the Kitt Peak National Observatory near of Tucson, Arizona, United States.

== Description ==
1996 XB_{27} is classified as an Amor asteroid because its perihelion is less than 1.3 AU and does not cross Earth's orbit. The asteroid is on a low-eccentricity and low-inclination orbit between the orbits of Earth and Mars. This is within a region of stability where bodies may survive for the age of the Solar System, and hence it may have formed near its current orbit.

It orbits the Sun at a distance of 1.1–1.3 AU once every 1 years and 4 months (474 days; semi-major axis of 1.19 AU). Its orbit has an eccentricity of 0.06 and an inclination of 2° with respect to the ecliptic. The body's observation arc begins with its official discovery observation at Kitt Peak in December 1996.

Between 1900 and 2200 its closest approach with Earth is more than 0.11 AU.

== See also ==
- (251732) 1998 HG49
- (350462) 1998 KG3
