= (350462) 1998 KG3 =

Sub-kilometer asteroid and near-Earth object

(350462) 1998 KG_{3}
Discovery
- Discovered by: Spacewatch
- Discovery site: Kitt Peak Obs.
- Discovery date: 22 May 1998

Designations
- Minor planet category: NEO; AMO

Orbital characteristics
- Epoch 22 June 2010 (JD 2455369.5)
- Uncertainty parameter 0
- Observation arc: 5473 days (14.98 yr)
- Aphelion: 1.29874461 AU (194.289428 Gm) (Q)
- Perihelion: 1.0232235 AU (153.07206 Gm) (q)
- Semi-major axis: 1.16098404 AU (173.680740 Gm) (a)
- Eccentricity: 0.1186585 (e)
- Orbital period (sidereal): 1.25 yr (456.92 d)
- Mean anomaly: 346.17186° (M)
- Mean motion: 0° 47^{m} 16.398^{s} / day (n)
- Inclination: 5.5028144° (i)
- Longitude of ascending node: 208.04450° (Ω)
- Argument of perihelion: 267.63305° (ω)
- Earth MOID: 0.0971038 AU (14.52652 Gm)
- T_{Jupiter}: 5.416

Physical characteristics
- Dimensions: 0.10–0.24 km
- Absolute magnitude (H): 22.1

(350462) 1998 KG_{3} is a sub-kilometer asteroid and near-Earth object of the Amor group, that is on a low-eccentricity and low-inclination orbit between the orbits of Earth and Mars. It was discovered by the Spacewatch survey at Kitt Peak National Observatory on 22 May 1998.

== Description ==
1998 KG_{3} is an Amor asteroid, because its perihelion is less than 1.3 AU and does not cross Earth's orbit. The asteroid measures approximately 100–240 meters in diameter.

Its orbit is within a region of stability where bodies may survive for the age of the Solar System, and hence it may have formed near its current orbit.

Between 1900 and 2200 its closest approach to Earth is more than 0.12 AU.

== See also ==
- (225312) 1996 XB27
- (251732) 1998 HG49
