= Meanings of minor-planet names: 251001–252000 =

As minor planet discoveries are confirmed, they are given a permanent number by the IAU's Minor Planet Center (MPC), and the discoverers can then submit names for them, following the IAU's naming conventions. The list below concerns those minor planets in the specified number-range that have received names, and explains the meanings of those names.

Official naming citations of newly named small Solar System bodies are approved and published in a bulletin by IAU's Working Group for Small Bodies Nomenclature (WGSBN). Before May 2021, citations were published in MPC's Minor Planet Circulars for many decades. Recent citations can also be found on the JPL Small-Body Database (SBDB). Until his death in 2016, German astronomer Lutz D. Schmadel compiled these citations into the Dictionary of Minor Planet Names (DMP) and regularly updated the collection.

Based on Paul Herget's The Names of the Minor Planets, Schmadel also researched the unclear origin of numerous asteroids, most of which had been named prior to World War II. This article incorporates text from this source, which is in the public domain: SBDB New namings may only be added to this list below after official publication as the preannouncement of names is condemned. The WGSBN publishes a comprehensive guideline for the naming rules of non-cometary small Solar System bodies.

== 251001–251100 ==
Named minor planet	Provisional	This minor planet was named for...	Ref · Catalog
251001 Sluch	2006 OM_{14}	Sluch, a river that flows through Ukraine in the basin of the Dniper.	JPL · 251001
251014 Bejczyantal	2006 QR_{4}	Antal Bejczy, Hungarian-born American electrical engineer, physicist and space scientist.	IAU · 251014
251015 Gregusspál	2006 QA_{6}	Pál Greguss, Hungarian biophysicist, chemist, and hologram researcher.	IAU · 251015
251018 Liubirena	2006 QC_{31}	Liubov Grinishyn (born 1955) and Irene Malinovska (born 1967), Ukraine poets and lyric story writers, as well as amateur astronomers at the nearby Andrushivka Astronomical Observatory	JPL · 251018

== 251101–251200 ==
back to top

Named minor planet	Provisional	This minor planet was named for...	Ref · Catalog
There are no named minor planets in this number range

== 251201–251300 ==
back to top

Named minor planet	Provisional	This minor planet was named for...	Ref · Catalog
There are no named minor planets in this number range

== 251301–251400 ==
back to top

Named minor planet	Provisional	This minor planet was named for...	Ref · Catalog
251325 Leopoldjosefine	2007 CX_{26}	Leopold Gierlinger (born 1935) and Josefine Gierlinger (born 1935), parents of German discoverer Richard Gierlinger	JPL · 251325

== 251401–251500 ==
back to top

Named minor planet	Provisional	This minor planet was named for...	Ref · Catalog
251449 Olexakorolʹ	2008 CK_{117}	Oleksiy Kostyantynovych Korolʹ (1913–1977) worked in the Main Astronomical Observatory of the Academy of Sciences of Ukraine and was a member of IAU Commission No. 9. He obtained observations of celestial bodies to help solve problems in fundamental astrometry.	JPL · 251449
251485 Bois-d'Amont	2008 ED_{7}	Bois-d'Amont is a small municipality about 6 km from Fribourg, Switzerland. It is home to the Observatory of Épendes, whose main objective is the promotion of astronomy, in particular among young people.	IAU · 251485

== 251501–251600 ==
back to top

Named minor planet	Provisional	This minor planet was named for...	Ref · Catalog
251512 Jacobcollier	2008 FK_{58}	Jacob Collier, British singer, composer and multi-instrumentalist.	IAU · 251512
251595 Rudolfböttger	2009 HA_{36}	Rudolf Christian Böttger (1806–1881), a German chemist and physicist at the Physical Society (German: Physikalischer Verein) of Frankfurt am Main	JPL · 251595

== 251601–251700 ==
back to top

Named minor planet	Provisional	This minor planet was named for...	Ref · Catalog
251619 Ravenna	2009 LS_{2}	Ravenna, Italian city and former capital of the Western Roman Empire, known for well-preserved ancient architecture and mosaics	IAU · 251619
251621 Lüthen	2009 RR_{2}	Hartwig Lüthen (born 1960), associate professor of plant physiology at the University of Hamburg	JPL · 251621
251625 Timconrow	2010 DD_{21}	Tim Conrow (born 1958), a senior engineer at the California Institute of Technology's Infrared Processing and Analysis Center	JPL · 251625
251627 Joyceearl	2010 JV_{16}	Joyce (1920–2003) and Earl (1914–1979) Bonar, grandparents of American astronomer Amy Mainzer, the principal investigator of the space-based NEOWISE mission	JPL · 251627
251633 Kivelson	2010 KP_{45}	Margaret Kivelson, American professor of planetary science and space physics at the University of California, Los Angeles.	IAU · 251633
251638 Kianamcfadden	2010 KD_{83}	Kiana McFadden, American planetary scientist.	IAU · 251638
251642 Leonardodicaprio	2010 LC_{97}	Leonardo DiCaprio (born 1974), American actor and film producer. Recipient of numerous accolades and noted for his environmental activism.	IAU · 251642

== 251701–251800 ==
back to top

Named minor planet	Provisional	This minor planet was named for...	Ref · Catalog
There are no named minor planets in this number range

== 251801–251900 ==
back to top

Named minor planet	Provisional	This minor planet was named for...	Ref · Catalog
There are no named minor planets in this number range

== 251901–252000 ==
back to top

Named minor planet	Provisional	This minor planet was named for...	Ref · Catalog
There are no named minor planets in this number range

back to top

Preceded by 250,001–251,000	Meanings of minor-planet names List of minor planets: 251,001–252,000	Succeeded by 252,001–253,000
