= (251732) 1998 HG49 =

Sub-kilometer asteroid and near-Earth object

(251732) 1998 HG_{49}
Discovery
- Discovered by: Spacewatch
- Discovery site: Kitt Peak National Obs.
- Discovery date: 27 April 1998

Designations
- Minor planet category: Amor; NEO

Orbital characteristics
- Epoch 4 September 2017 (JD 2458000.5)
- Uncertainty parameter 0
- Observation arc: 16.91 yr (6,175 days)
- Aphelion: 1.3357 AU
- Perihelion: 1.0654 AU
- Semi-major axis: 1.2006 AU
- Eccentricity: 0.1126
- Orbital period (sidereal): 1.32 yr (480 days)
- Mean anomaly: 100.57°
- Mean motion: 0° 44^{m} 57.48^{s} / day
- Inclination: 4.1954°
- Longitude of ascending node: 44.829°
- Argument of perihelion: 324.29°
- Earth MOID: 0.0767 AU (29.9 LD)

Physical characteristics
- Mean diameter: 0.13–0.29 km (estimate)
- Absolute magnitude (H): 21.7; 21.8

(251732) 1998 HG_{49} is a sub-kilometer asteroid and near-Earth object of the Amor group, approximately 200 meters in diameter. It was discovered on 27 April 1998 by astronomers of the Spacewatch program at the Kitt Peak National Observatory near Tucson, Arizona, United States.

== Description ==
1998 HG_{49} is an Amor asteroid because its perihelion is less than 1.3 AU and does not cross Earth's orbit. It is on a low-eccentricity and low-inclination orbit between the orbits of Earth and Mars. This is within a region of stability where bodies may survive for the age of the Solar System, and hence it may have formed near its current orbit.

The asteroid orbits the Sun at a distance of 1.1–1.3 AU once every 1 year and 4 months (480 days; semi-major axis of 1.20 AU). Its orbit has an eccentricity of 0.11 and an inclination of 4° with respect to the ecliptic. The body's observation arc begins with its official discovery observation at Kitt Peak in April 1998.

Between 1900 and 2200 its closest approach to Earth is more than 0.14 AU.

== Numbering and naming ==
This minor planet was numbered by the Minor Planet Center on 28 November 2010. As of 2018, it has not been named.

== See also ==
- (225312) 1996 XB27
- (350462) 1998 KG3
