= List of minor planets: 250001–251000 =

The following is a partial list of minor planets, running from minor-planet number 250001 through 251000, inclusive. The primary data for this and other partial lists is based on JPL's "Small-Body Orbital Elements" and data available from the Minor Planet Center. Critical list information is also provided by the MPC, unless otherwise specified from Lowell Observatory. A detailed description of the table's columns and additional sources are given on the main page including a complete list of every page in this series, and a statistical break-up on the dynamical classification of minor planets.

Also see the summary list of all named bodies in numerical and alphabetical order, and the corresponding naming citations for the number range of this particular list. New namings may only be added to this list after official publication, as the preannouncement of names is condemned by the Working Group for Small Bodies Nomenclature of the International Astronomical Union.

Near-Earth obj.	MBA (inner)	MBA (outer)	Centaur
Mars-crosser	MBA (middle)	Jupiter trojan	Trans-Neptunian obj.
Unclassified

== 250001–250100 ==
Designation			Discovery			Properties		Ref
Permanent	Provisional	Named after	Date	Site	Discoverer(s)	Category	Diam.	Ref
250001	2001 XR_{265}	—	December 14, 2001	Socorro	LINEAR	·	4.5 km	MPC · JPL
250002	2001 YJ_{51}	—	December 18, 2001	Socorro	LINEAR	KOR	1.9 km	MPC · JPL
250003	2001 YQ_{59}	—	December 18, 2001	Socorro	LINEAR	·	2.7 km	MPC · JPL
250004	2001 YD_{107}	—	December 17, 2001	Socorro	LINEAR	TEL	2.2 km	MPC · JPL
250005	2001 YB_{126}	—	December 17, 2001	Socorro	LINEAR	·	2.1 km	MPC · JPL
250006	2002 AT	—	January 5, 2002	Oizumi	T. Kobayashi	·	1.1 km	MPC · JPL
250007	2002 AR_{9}	—	January 11, 2002	Desert Eagle	W. K. Y. Yeung	·	3.7 km	MPC · JPL
250008	2002 AO_{31}	—	January 8, 2002	Socorro	LINEAR	·	1.1 km	MPC · JPL
250009	2002 AV_{38}	—	January 9, 2002	Socorro	LINEAR	EOS	2.6 km	MPC · JPL
250010	2002 AF_{44}	—	January 9, 2002	Socorro	LINEAR	·	2.6 km	MPC · JPL
250011	2002 AY_{48}	—	January 9, 2002	Socorro	LINEAR	EOS	2.6 km	MPC · JPL
250012	2002 AX_{51}	—	January 9, 2002	Socorro	LINEAR	·	3.1 km	MPC · JPL
250013	2002 AT_{73}	—	January 8, 2002	Socorro	LINEAR	·	2.5 km	MPC · JPL
250014	2002 AZ_{75}	—	January 8, 2002	Socorro	LINEAR	EOS	2.7 km	MPC · JPL
250015	2002 AQ_{86}	—	January 9, 2002	Socorro	LINEAR	EOS	3.4 km	MPC · JPL
250016	2002 AB_{94}	—	January 8, 2002	Socorro	LINEAR	·	990 m	MPC · JPL
250017	2002 AK_{110}	—	January 9, 2002	Socorro	LINEAR	·	4.9 km	MPC · JPL
250018	2002 AQ_{126}	—	January 13, 2002	Socorro	LINEAR	·	3.1 km	MPC · JPL
250019	2002 AF_{141}	—	January 13, 2002	Socorro	LINEAR	·	4.3 km	MPC · JPL
250020	2002 AB_{161}	—	January 13, 2002	Socorro	LINEAR	·	920 m	MPC · JPL
250021	2002 AH_{201}	—	January 13, 2002	Socorro	LINEAR	·	1.1 km	MPC · JPL
250022	2002 BF_{16}	—	January 19, 2002	Kitt Peak	Spacewatch	·	870 m	MPC · JPL
250023	2002 CV_{7}	—	February 6, 2002	Desert Eagle	W. K. Y. Yeung	·	980 m	MPC · JPL
250024	2002 CA_{12}	—	February 6, 2002	Socorro	LINEAR	·	1 km	MPC · JPL
250025	2002 CE_{19}	—	February 4, 2002	Palomar	NEAT	EOS	3.1 km	MPC · JPL
250026	2002 CL_{23}	—	February 5, 2002	Haleakala	NEAT	·	4.7 km	MPC · JPL
250027	2002 CQ_{37}	—	February 7, 2002	Socorro	LINEAR	·	1.2 km	MPC · JPL
250028	2002 CO_{46}	—	February 7, 2002	Bohyunsan	Bohyunsan	·	850 m	MPC · JPL
250029	2002 CQ_{49}	—	February 3, 2002	Haleakala	NEAT	EOS	2.9 km	MPC · JPL
250030	2002 CQ_{51}	—	February 12, 2002	Desert Eagle	W. K. Y. Yeung	·	970 m	MPC · JPL
250031	2002 CD_{71}	—	February 7, 2002	Socorro	LINEAR	·	4.6 km	MPC · JPL
250032	2002 CQ_{71}	—	February 7, 2002	Socorro	LINEAR	EOS	2.7 km	MPC · JPL
250033	2002 CW_{80}	—	February 7, 2002	Socorro	LINEAR	EOS	2.4 km	MPC · JPL
250034	2002 CV_{81}	—	February 7, 2002	Socorro	LINEAR	·	1.3 km	MPC · JPL
250035	2002 CZ_{116}	—	February 15, 2002	Bohyunsan	Bohyunsan	·	2.0 km	MPC · JPL
250036	2002 CO_{118}	—	February 9, 2002	Kitt Peak	Spacewatch	EOS	2.8 km	MPC · JPL
250037	2002 CG_{125}	—	February 7, 2002	Socorro	LINEAR	·	1.2 km	MPC · JPL
250038	2002 CC_{152}	—	February 10, 2002	Socorro	LINEAR	·	5.8 km	MPC · JPL
250039	2002 CH_{164}	—	February 8, 2002	Socorro	LINEAR	·	4.1 km	MPC · JPL
250040	2002 CA_{167}	—	February 8, 2002	Socorro	LINEAR	·	1.3 km	MPC · JPL
250041	2002 CT_{182}	—	February 10, 2002	Socorro	LINEAR	·	4.2 km	MPC · JPL
250042	2002 CH_{210}	—	February 10, 2002	Socorro	LINEAR	EOS	2.8 km	MPC · JPL
250043	2002 CA_{214}	—	February 10, 2002	Socorro	LINEAR	·	5.2 km	MPC · JPL
250044	2002 CL_{223}	—	February 11, 2002	Socorro	LINEAR	LIX	6.1 km	MPC · JPL
250045	2002 CX_{227}	—	February 6, 2002	Palomar	NEAT	·	5.3 km	MPC · JPL
250046	2002 CD_{228}	—	February 6, 2002	Palomar	NEAT	EOS	3.2 km	MPC · JPL
250047	2002 CF_{239}	—	February 11, 2002	Socorro	LINEAR	(2076)	1.1 km	MPC · JPL
250048	2002 CE_{247}	—	February 15, 2002	Socorro	LINEAR	·	4.7 km	MPC · JPL
250049	2002 CQ_{253}	—	February 4, 2002	Anderson Mesa	LONEOS	·	4.9 km	MPC · JPL
250050	2002 CQ_{277}	—	February 7, 2002	Palomar	NEAT	·	820 m	MPC · JPL
250051	2002 CM_{295}	—	February 10, 2002	Socorro	LINEAR	·	5.1 km	MPC · JPL
250052	2002 CC_{297}	—	February 10, 2002	Socorro	LINEAR	·	4.2 km	MPC · JPL
250053	2002 CK_{299}	—	February 12, 2002	Socorro	LINEAR	·	4.8 km	MPC · JPL
250054	2002 CR_{301}	—	February 12, 2002	Socorro	LINEAR	·	4.2 km	MPC · JPL
250055	2002 CH_{303}	—	February 14, 2002	Cerro Tololo	Deep Lens Survey	·	5.3 km	MPC · JPL
250056	2002 CX_{305}	—	February 3, 2002	Palomar	NEAT	·	3.4 km	MPC · JPL
250057	2002 CS_{308}	—	February 10, 2002	Socorro	LINEAR	·	1.1 km	MPC · JPL
250058	2002 CP_{312}	—	February 6, 2002	La Silla	Barbieri, C.	·	910 m	MPC · JPL
250059	2002 CK_{316}	—	February 6, 2002	Palomar	NEAT	·	1.1 km	MPC · JPL
250060	2002 DQ_{16}	—	February 20, 2002	Socorro	LINEAR	V	870 m	MPC · JPL
250061	2002 EO	—	March 5, 2002	Desert Eagle	W. K. Y. Yeung	·	7.1 km	MPC · JPL
250062	2002 ED_{8}	—	March 12, 2002	Palomar	NEAT	·	7.2 km	MPC · JPL
250063	2002 EC_{40}	—	March 9, 2002	Socorro	LINEAR	·	3.1 km	MPC · JPL
250064	2002 EH_{56}	—	March 13, 2002	Socorro	LINEAR	·	1.0 km	MPC · JPL
250065	2002 EB_{62}	—	March 13, 2002	Socorro	LINEAR	EOS	2.6 km	MPC · JPL
250066	2002 EE_{62}	—	March 13, 2002	Socorro	LINEAR	·	890 m	MPC · JPL
250067	2002 EP_{62}	—	March 13, 2002	Socorro	LINEAR	·	1.1 km	MPC · JPL
250068	2002 EZ_{75}	—	March 14, 2002	Palomar	NEAT	·	1.1 km	MPC · JPL
250069	2002 ED_{81}	—	March 13, 2002	Palomar	NEAT	·	1.1 km	MPC · JPL
250070	2002 EO_{82}	—	March 13, 2002	Palomar	NEAT	·	4.1 km	MPC · JPL
250071	2002 EO_{89}	—	March 12, 2002	Socorro	LINEAR	·	6.9 km	MPC · JPL
250072	2002 EB_{99}	—	March 15, 2002	Socorro	LINEAR	V	1.1 km	MPC · JPL
250073	2002 EN_{114}	—	March 10, 2002	Kitt Peak	Spacewatch	·	1.2 km	MPC · JPL
250074	2002 EE_{117}	—	March 9, 2002	Kitt Peak	Spacewatch	·	3.2 km	MPC · JPL
250075	2002 EY_{123}	—	March 12, 2002	Kitt Peak	Spacewatch	·	3.4 km	MPC · JPL
250076	2002 EL_{135}	—	March 14, 2002	Socorro	LINEAR	·	5.9 km	MPC · JPL
250077	2002 EE_{144}	—	March 13, 2002	Kitt Peak	Spacewatch	EOS	3.0 km	MPC · JPL
250078	2002 EO_{149}	—	March 15, 2002	Palomar	NEAT	·	1.7 km	MPC · JPL
250079	2002 EG_{154}	—	March 13, 2002	Socorro	LINEAR	T_{j} (2.99)	6.1 km	MPC · JPL
250080	2002 EQ_{155}	—	March 5, 2002	Catalina	CSS	·	1.3 km	MPC · JPL
250081	2002 ED_{158}	—	March 5, 2002	Apache Point	SDSS	·	1.6 km	MPC · JPL
250082	2002 EM_{161}	—	March 6, 2002	Palomar	NEAT	VER	4.9 km	MPC · JPL
250083	2002 EH_{162}	—	March 12, 2002	Palomar	NEAT	·	1.7 km	MPC · JPL
250084	2002 FD_{26}	—	March 19, 2002	Palomar	NEAT	LUT	6.1 km	MPC · JPL
250085	2002 FJ_{33}	—	March 20, 2002	Socorro	LINEAR	·	3.9 km	MPC · JPL
250086	2002 GW	—	April 3, 2002	Palomar	NEAT	PHO	2.6 km	MPC · JPL
250087	2002 GW_{24}	—	April 13, 2002	Kitt Peak	Spacewatch	THM	3.0 km	MPC · JPL
250088	2002 GA_{26}	—	April 14, 2002	Kitt Peak	Spacewatch	·	1.2 km	MPC · JPL
250089	2002 GH_{35}	—	April 1, 2002	Palomar	NEAT	NYS	1.4 km	MPC · JPL
250090	2002 GE_{48}	—	April 4, 2002	Palomar	NEAT	V	880 m	MPC · JPL
250091	2002 GF_{64}	—	April 8, 2002	Palomar	NEAT	NYS	1.4 km	MPC · JPL
250092	2002 GN_{66}	—	April 8, 2002	Palomar	NEAT	NYS	1.3 km	MPC · JPL
250093	2002 GC_{67}	—	April 8, 2002	Kitt Peak	Spacewatch	·	1.5 km	MPC · JPL
250094	2002 GU_{83}	—	April 10, 2002	Socorro	LINEAR	EUP	6.3 km	MPC · JPL
250095	2002 GL_{89}	—	April 8, 2002	Palomar	NEAT	·	5.5 km	MPC · JPL
250096	2002 GK_{98}	—	April 10, 2002	Socorro	LINEAR	EUP	5.8 km	MPC · JPL
250097	2002 GW_{100}	—	April 10, 2002	Socorro	LINEAR	·	2.0 km	MPC · JPL
250098	2002 GR_{104}	—	April 10, 2002	Socorro	LINEAR	·	1.7 km	MPC · JPL
250099	2002 GF_{128}	—	April 12, 2002	Socorro	LINEAR	·	6.5 km	MPC · JPL
250100	2002 GZ_{139}	—	April 13, 2002	Kitt Peak	Spacewatch	NYS	1.4 km	MPC · JPL

== 250101–250200 ==
back to top

Designation			Discovery			Properties		Ref
Permanent	Provisional	Named after	Date	Site	Discoverer(s)	Category	Diam.	Ref
250101	2002 GF_{182}	—	April 3, 2002	Palomar	NEAT	·	2.0 km	MPC · JPL
250102	2002 GV_{188}	—	April 9, 2002	Palomar	NEAT	(2076)	890 m	MPC · JPL
250103	2002 HB	—	April 16, 2002	Socorro	LINEAR	PHO	2.1 km	MPC · JPL
250104	2002 HO_{8}	—	April 19, 2002	Kitt Peak	Spacewatch	NYS	1.5 km	MPC · JPL
250105	2002 JY_{57}	—	May 9, 2002	Socorro	LINEAR	·	1.9 km	MPC · JPL
250106	2002 JJ_{77}	—	May 11, 2002	Socorro	LINEAR	·	1.3 km	MPC · JPL
250107	2002 JP_{82}	—	May 11, 2002	Socorro	LINEAR	·	3.9 km	MPC · JPL
250108	2002 JR_{99}	—	May 11, 2002	Palomar	NEAT	·	1.9 km	MPC · JPL
250109	2002 JG_{127}	—	May 7, 2002	Palomar	NEAT	·	6.9 km	MPC · JPL
250110	2002 JE_{137}	—	May 9, 2002	Palomar	NEAT	MAS	940 m	MPC · JPL
250111	2002 JB_{144}	—	May 13, 2002	Socorro	LINEAR	·	1.5 km	MPC · JPL
250112	2002 KY_{14}	—	May 19, 2002	Palomar	C. A. Trujillo, M. E. Brown	centaur	39 km	MPC · JPL
250113	2002 LS_{7}	—	June 2, 2002	Anderson Mesa	LONEOS	ERI	2.3 km	MPC · JPL
250114	2002 LJ_{11}	—	June 5, 2002	Socorro	LINEAR	·	1.4 km	MPC · JPL
250115	2002 LO_{15}	—	June 6, 2002	Socorro	LINEAR	·	1.7 km	MPC · JPL
250116	2002 LH_{28}	—	June 9, 2002	Socorro	LINEAR	·	1.7 km	MPC · JPL
250117	2002 NZ_{5}	—	July 10, 2002	Campo Imperatore	CINEOS	H	720 m	MPC · JPL
250118	2002 NU_{69}	—	July 11, 2002	Palomar	NEAT	V	1.1 km	MPC · JPL
250119	2002 OS_{6}	—	July 20, 2002	Palomar	NEAT	H	750 m	MPC · JPL
250120	2002 OQ_{26}	—	July 18, 2002	Palomar	NEAT	·	1.4 km	MPC · JPL
250121	2002 PQ_{17}	—	August 6, 2002	Palomar	NEAT	·	2.2 km	MPC · JPL
250122	2002 PD_{25}	—	August 6, 2002	Palomar	NEAT	·	1.5 km	MPC · JPL
250123	2002 PP_{43}	—	August 11, 2002	Socorro	LINEAR	H	750 m	MPC · JPL
250124	2002 PY_{47}	—	August 10, 2002	Socorro	LINEAR	T_{j} (2.95) · HIL	6.9 km	MPC · JPL
250125	2002 PL_{74}	—	August 12, 2002	Socorro	LINEAR	HIL · 3:2 · (3561)	7.4 km	MPC · JPL
250126	2002 PK_{98}	—	August 14, 2002	Socorro	LINEAR	·	5.3 km	MPC · JPL
250127	2002 PS_{141}	—	August 5, 2002	Palomar	NEAT	·	1.4 km	MPC · JPL
250128	2002 PV_{155}	—	August 8, 2002	Palomar	S. F. Hönig	T_{j} (2.98) · 3:2 · SHU	7.0 km	MPC · JPL
250129	2002 QE_{11}	—	August 24, 2002	Palomar	NEAT	V	1.1 km	MPC · JPL
250130	2002 QC_{27}	—	August 28, 2002	Palomar	NEAT	·	1.7 km	MPC · JPL
250131	2002 QK_{44}	—	August 29, 2002	Palomar	NEAT	·	2.4 km	MPC · JPL
250132	2002 QC_{52}	—	August 29, 2002	Palomar	S. F. Hönig	T_{j} (2.99) · 3:2 · SHU	5.5 km	MPC · JPL
250133	2002 QD_{64}	—	August 28, 2002	Palomar	NEAT	·	1.5 km	MPC · JPL
250134	2002 QK_{83}	—	August 17, 2002	Palomar	NEAT	·	1.7 km	MPC · JPL
250135	2002 QU_{100}	—	August 30, 2002	Palomar	NEAT	·	1.4 km	MPC · JPL
250136	2002 QS_{131}	—	August 28, 2002	Palomar	NEAT	3:2	5.4 km	MPC · JPL
250137	2002 RZ_{21}	—	September 4, 2002	Anderson Mesa	LONEOS	·	1.2 km	MPC · JPL
250138	2002 RD_{52}	—	September 5, 2002	Socorro	LINEAR	·	1.3 km	MPC · JPL
250139	2002 RK_{68}	—	September 4, 2002	Anderson Mesa	LONEOS	HIL · 3:2	8.3 km	MPC · JPL
250140	2002 RV_{70}	—	September 4, 2002	Palomar	NEAT	·	2.3 km	MPC · JPL
250141	2002 RX_{70}	—	September 4, 2002	Palomar	NEAT	·	2.1 km	MPC · JPL
250142	2002 RN_{79}	—	September 5, 2002	Socorro	LINEAR	3:2	7.2 km	MPC · JPL
250143	2002 RD_{82}	—	September 5, 2002	Socorro	LINEAR	·	1.2 km	MPC · JPL
250144	2002 RC_{99}	—	September 5, 2002	Socorro	LINEAR	·	2.2 km	MPC · JPL
250145	2002 RD_{136}	—	September 11, 2002	Haleakala	NEAT	·	1.9 km	MPC · JPL
250146	2002 RE_{147}	—	September 11, 2002	Palomar	NEAT	·	1.1 km	MPC · JPL
250147	2002 RT_{181}	—	September 13, 2002	Kitt Peak	Spacewatch	3:2	7.4 km	MPC · JPL
250148	2002 RX_{182}	—	September 11, 2002	Palomar	NEAT	·	1.9 km	MPC · JPL
250149	2002 RW_{206}	—	September 14, 2002	Haleakala	NEAT	·	1.7 km	MPC · JPL
250150	2002 RL_{236}	—	September 12, 2002	Palomar	R. Matson	·	930 m	MPC · JPL
250151	2002 RT_{241}	—	September 13, 2002	Palomar	R. Matson	·	1.8 km	MPC · JPL
250152	2002 SQ_{13}	—	September 27, 2002	Palomar	NEAT	H	870 m	MPC · JPL
250153	2002 SU_{20}	—	September 26, 2002	Palomar	NEAT	·	1.2 km	MPC · JPL
250154	2002 SL_{30}	—	September 28, 2002	Haleakala	NEAT	EUN	2.5 km	MPC · JPL
250155	2002 TT_{28}	—	October 2, 2002	Socorro	LINEAR	·	1.7 km	MPC · JPL
250156	2002 TY_{30}	—	October 2, 2002	Socorro	LINEAR	EUN	1.6 km	MPC · JPL
250157	2002 TV_{34}	—	October 2, 2002	Socorro	LINEAR	·	1.5 km	MPC · JPL
250158	2002 TD_{42}	—	October 2, 2002	Socorro	LINEAR	·	1.4 km	MPC · JPL
250159	2002 TY_{42}	—	October 2, 2002	Socorro	LINEAR	·	1.8 km	MPC · JPL
250160	2002 TY_{53}	—	October 2, 2002	Socorro	LINEAR	·	1.7 km	MPC · JPL
250161	2002 TZ_{54}	—	October 2, 2002	Socorro	LINEAR	·	3.7 km	MPC · JPL
250162	2002 TY_{57}	—	October 2, 2002	Haleakala	NEAT	AMO · moon	420 m	MPC · JPL
250163	2002 TM_{67}	—	October 7, 2002	Socorro	LINEAR	·	2.3 km	MPC · JPL
250164 Hannsruder	2002 TM_{69}	Hannsruder	October 10, 2002	Trebur	Kretlow, M.	·	1.4 km	MPC · JPL
250165	2002 TX_{73}	—	October 3, 2002	Palomar	NEAT	·	1.6 km	MPC · JPL
250166	2002 TR_{76}	—	October 1, 2002	Anderson Mesa	LONEOS	(5)	1.6 km	MPC · JPL
250167	2002 TS_{93}	—	October 3, 2002	Socorro	LINEAR	·	1.8 km	MPC · JPL
250168	2002 TF_{102}	—	October 4, 2002	Socorro	LINEAR	·	2.2 km	MPC · JPL
250169	2002 TJ_{102}	—	October 4, 2002	Socorro	LINEAR	(5)	1.0 km	MPC · JPL
250170	2002 TC_{113}	—	October 3, 2002	Palomar	NEAT	·	2.4 km	MPC · JPL
250171	2002 TH_{133}	—	October 4, 2002	Socorro	LINEAR	MAR	1.5 km	MPC · JPL
250172	2002 TT_{146}	—	October 4, 2002	Socorro	LINEAR	·	1.5 km	MPC · JPL
250173	2002 TZ_{196}	—	October 4, 2002	Socorro	LINEAR	·	2.3 km	MPC · JPL
250174	2002 TK_{203}	—	October 4, 2002	Socorro	LINEAR	·	1.3 km	MPC · JPL
250175	2002 TW_{211}	—	October 6, 2002	Haleakala	NEAT	EUN	1.9 km	MPC · JPL
250176	2002 TA_{222}	—	October 7, 2002	Anderson Mesa	LONEOS	(5)	3.6 km	MPC · JPL
250177	2002 TO_{223}	—	October 7, 2002	Socorro	LINEAR	·	1.6 km	MPC · JPL
250178	2002 TK_{232}	—	October 6, 2002	Socorro	LINEAR	·	3.0 km	MPC · JPL
250179	2002 TU_{236}	—	October 6, 2002	Socorro	LINEAR	EUN	2.2 km	MPC · JPL
250180	2002 TP_{237}	—	October 6, 2002	Socorro	LINEAR	H	960 m	MPC · JPL
250181	2002 TU_{249}	—	October 7, 2002	Anderson Mesa	LONEOS	RAF	1.3 km	MPC · JPL
250182	2002 TZ_{252}	—	October 8, 2002	Anderson Mesa	LONEOS	(5)	1.2 km	MPC · JPL
250183	2002 TX_{271}	—	October 9, 2002	Socorro	LINEAR	(5)	1.8 km	MPC · JPL
250184	2002 TE_{289}	—	October 10, 2002	Socorro	LINEAR	·	1.7 km	MPC · JPL
250185	2002 TH_{291}	—	October 10, 2002	Socorro	LINEAR	·	1.3 km	MPC · JPL
250186	2002 TH_{293}	—	October 10, 2002	Socorro	LINEAR	·	2.9 km	MPC · JPL
250187	2002 TT_{297}	—	October 11, 2002	Socorro	LINEAR	·	1.6 km	MPC · JPL
250188	2002 TN_{299}	—	October 13, 2002	Kitt Peak	Spacewatch	·	1.4 km	MPC · JPL
250189	2002 TW_{300}	—	October 15, 2002	Socorro	LINEAR	EUN	1.6 km	MPC · JPL
250190	2002 TN_{324}	—	October 5, 2002	Apache Point	SDSS	·	1.1 km	MPC · JPL
250191	2002 TJ_{378}	—	October 5, 2002	Apache Point	SDSS	·	1.7 km	MPC · JPL
250192	2002 UM_{12}	—	October 31, 2002	Haleakala	NEAT	·	3.7 km	MPC · JPL
250193	2002 UX_{19}	—	October 30, 2002	Haleakala	NEAT	·	1.6 km	MPC · JPL
250194	2002 UZ_{20}	—	October 29, 2002	Kitt Peak	Spacewatch	·	2.6 km	MPC · JPL
250195	2002 UX_{22}	—	October 30, 2002	Haleakala	NEAT	·	1.7 km	MPC · JPL
250196	2002 UZ_{33}	—	October 31, 2002	Kitt Peak	Spacewatch	MIS	2.7 km	MPC · JPL
250197	2002 UL_{36}	—	October 31, 2002	Anderson Mesa	LONEOS	·	1.9 km	MPC · JPL
250198	2002 US_{38}	—	October 31, 2002	Palomar	NEAT	·	1.4 km	MPC · JPL
250199	2002 UY_{38}	—	October 31, 2002	Palomar	NEAT	(5)	1.5 km	MPC · JPL
250200	2002 UM_{40}	—	October 31, 2002	Socorro	LINEAR	·	2.7 km	MPC · JPL

== 250201–250300 ==
back to top

Designation			Discovery			Properties		Ref
Permanent	Provisional	Named after	Date	Site	Discoverer(s)	Category	Diam.	Ref
250201	2002 UA_{41}	—	October 31, 2002	Palomar	NEAT	WIT	1.4 km	MPC · JPL
250202	2002 US_{44}	—	October 30, 2002	Socorro	LINEAR	(5)	1.3 km	MPC · JPL
250203	2002 UN_{65}	—	October 30, 2002	Apache Point	SDSS	·	1.5 km	MPC · JPL
250204	2002 UW_{77}	—	October 29, 2002	Palomar	NEAT	·	1.9 km	MPC · JPL
250205	2002 VU_{3}	—	November 1, 2002	Palomar	NEAT	·	2.2 km	MPC · JPL
250206	2002 VS_{6}	—	November 1, 2002	Palomar	NEAT	·	1.0 km	MPC · JPL
250207	2002 VU_{8}	—	November 1, 2002	Palomar	NEAT	·	1.8 km	MPC · JPL
250208	2002 VO_{27}	—	November 5, 2002	Anderson Mesa	LONEOS	·	1.4 km	MPC · JPL
250209	2002 VK_{29}	—	November 5, 2002	Socorro	LINEAR	·	2.0 km	MPC · JPL
250210	2002 VP_{31}	—	November 5, 2002	Socorro	LINEAR	·	1.6 km	MPC · JPL
250211	2002 VV_{33}	—	November 5, 2002	Socorro	LINEAR	EUN	2.0 km	MPC · JPL
250212	2002 VD_{34}	—	November 5, 2002	Socorro	LINEAR	·	2.8 km	MPC · JPL
250213	2002 VM_{35}	—	November 5, 2002	Socorro	LINEAR	ADE	2.6 km	MPC · JPL
250214	2002 VF_{36}	—	November 5, 2002	Socorro	LINEAR	(5)	1.8 km	MPC · JPL
250215	2002 VF_{42}	—	November 5, 2002	Palomar	NEAT	·	1.2 km	MPC · JPL
250216	2002 VQ_{56}	—	November 6, 2002	Socorro	LINEAR	HNS ·	3.9 km	MPC · JPL
250217	2002 VO_{79}	—	November 7, 2002	Socorro	LINEAR	·	1.5 km	MPC · JPL
250218	2002 VC_{84}	—	November 7, 2002	Socorro	LINEAR	·	2.6 km	MPC · JPL
250219	2002 VS_{86}	—	November 8, 2002	Socorro	LINEAR	(5)	1.4 km	MPC · JPL
250220	2002 VH_{87}	—	November 8, 2002	Socorro	LINEAR	EUN	2.0 km	MPC · JPL
250221	2002 VS_{102}	—	November 12, 2002	Socorro	LINEAR	·	2.8 km	MPC · JPL
250222	2002 VM_{103}	—	November 12, 2002	Socorro	LINEAR	·	1.5 km	MPC · JPL
250223	2002 VD_{115}	—	November 11, 2002	Socorro	LINEAR	(5)	1.4 km	MPC · JPL
250224	2002 VO_{117}	—	November 11, 2002	Socorro	LINEAR	H	860 m	MPC · JPL
250225	2002 VJ_{125}	—	November 13, 2002	Palomar	NEAT	·	2.0 km	MPC · JPL
250226	2002 VT_{139}	—	November 7, 2002	Socorro	LINEAR	·	2.7 km	MPC · JPL
250227	2002 WB_{15}	—	November 28, 2002	Anderson Mesa	LONEOS	·	4.2 km	MPC · JPL
250228	2002 WM_{18}	—	November 30, 2002	Haleakala	NEAT	EUN	1.7 km	MPC · JPL
250229	2002 XG_{32}	—	December 6, 2002	Socorro	LINEAR	·	2.9 km	MPC · JPL
250230	2002 XJ_{38}	—	December 6, 2002	Socorro	LINEAR	ADE	2.8 km	MPC · JPL
250231	2002 XF_{50}	—	December 10, 2002	Socorro	LINEAR	·	2.5 km	MPC · JPL
250232	2002 XQ_{55}	—	December 10, 2002	Palomar	NEAT	·	1.7 km	MPC · JPL
250233	2002 XC_{64}	—	December 11, 2002	Socorro	LINEAR	·	2.2 km	MPC · JPL
250234	2002 XN_{70}	—	December 10, 2002	Socorro	LINEAR	·	2.6 km	MPC · JPL
250235	2002 XQ_{73}	—	December 11, 2002	Socorro	LINEAR	KON	3.1 km	MPC · JPL
250236	2002 XQ_{74}	—	December 11, 2002	Socorro	LINEAR	(5)	2.1 km	MPC · JPL
250237	2002 XW_{74}	—	December 11, 2002	Socorro	LINEAR	(5)	1.7 km	MPC · JPL
250238	2002 XF_{78}	—	December 11, 2002	Socorro	LINEAR	(5)	1.8 km	MPC · JPL
250239	2002 XX_{79}	—	December 11, 2002	Socorro	LINEAR	·	3.9 km	MPC · JPL
250240	2002 XY_{79}	—	December 11, 2002	Socorro	LINEAR	·	2.2 km	MPC · JPL
250241	2002 XE_{82}	—	December 11, 2002	Palomar	NEAT	·	3.0 km	MPC · JPL
250242	2002 XT_{95}	—	December 5, 2002	Socorro	LINEAR	(5)	1.7 km	MPC · JPL
250243	2002 YP_{18}	—	December 31, 2002	Socorro	LINEAR	·	3.9 km	MPC · JPL
250244	2003 AG	—	January 1, 2003	Socorro	LINEAR	H	1.1 km	MPC · JPL
250245	2003 AR_{34}	—	January 7, 2003	Socorro	LINEAR	(5)	2.4 km	MPC · JPL
250246	2003 AW_{36}	—	January 7, 2003	Socorro	LINEAR	·	2.4 km	MPC · JPL
250247	2003 AA_{38}	—	January 7, 2003	Socorro	LINEAR	slow	5.4 km	MPC · JPL
250248	2003 AY_{45}	—	January 5, 2003	Socorro	LINEAR	(5)	2.6 km	MPC · JPL
250249	2003 AG_{63}	—	January 8, 2003	Socorro	LINEAR	·	2.4 km	MPC · JPL
250250	2003 AT_{64}	—	January 7, 2003	Socorro	LINEAR	ADE	4.5 km	MPC · JPL
250251	2003 AZ_{67}	—	January 8, 2003	Socorro	LINEAR	·	3.2 km	MPC · JPL
250252	2003 AE_{68}	—	January 8, 2003	Socorro	LINEAR	·	2.1 km	MPC · JPL
250253	2003 BP_{8}	—	January 26, 2003	Anderson Mesa	LONEOS	·	2.5 km	MPC · JPL
250254	2003 BL_{23}	—	January 25, 2003	Palomar	NEAT	·	2.1 km	MPC · JPL
250255	2003 BL_{34}	—	January 26, 2003	Haleakala	NEAT	·	2.1 km	MPC · JPL
250256	2003 BG_{50}	—	January 27, 2003	Socorro	LINEAR	·	2.1 km	MPC · JPL
250257	2003 BD_{51}	—	January 27, 2003	Socorro	LINEAR	·	2.9 km	MPC · JPL
250258	2003 BL_{54}	—	January 27, 2003	Palomar	NEAT	(1547)	1.9 km	MPC · JPL
250259	2003 BM_{54}	—	January 27, 2003	Palomar	NEAT	·	2.6 km	MPC · JPL
250260	2003 BT_{75}	—	January 29, 2003	Palomar	NEAT	·	3.5 km	MPC · JPL
250261	2003 BE_{79}	—	January 31, 2003	Anderson Mesa	LONEOS	·	2.4 km	MPC · JPL
250262	2003 CQ_{2}	—	February 2, 2003	Socorro	LINEAR	·	4.3 km	MPC · JPL
250263	2003 CR_{5}	—	February 1, 2003	Socorro	LINEAR	·	1.5 km	MPC · JPL
250264	2003 CV_{12}	—	February 2, 2003	Socorro	LINEAR	·	3.1 km	MPC · JPL
250265	2003 CD_{22}	—	February 3, 2003	Anderson Mesa	LONEOS	·	3.4 km	MPC · JPL
250266	2003 EY_{30}	—	March 6, 2003	Palomar	NEAT	·	4.8 km	MPC · JPL
250267	2003 FD_{7}	—	March 28, 2003	Piszkéstető	K. Sárneczky	·	1.4 km	MPC · JPL
250268	2003 FJ_{31}	—	March 23, 2003	Kitt Peak	Spacewatch	·	3.3 km	MPC · JPL
250269	2003 FG_{36}	—	March 23, 2003	Kitt Peak	Spacewatch	KOR	1.9 km	MPC · JPL
250270	2003 FO_{43}	—	March 23, 2003	Kitt Peak	Spacewatch	KOR	2.2 km	MPC · JPL
250271	2003 FO_{45}	—	March 24, 2003	Kitt Peak	Spacewatch	·	2.6 km	MPC · JPL
250272	2003 FN_{59}	—	March 26, 2003	Palomar	NEAT	·	3.3 km	MPC · JPL
250273	2003 FA_{67}	—	March 26, 2003	Palomar	NEAT	TIR	4.3 km	MPC · JPL
250274	2003 GU_{4}	—	April 1, 2003	Socorro	LINEAR	EOS	3.1 km	MPC · JPL
250275	2003 GS_{47}	—	April 8, 2003	Socorro	LINEAR	·	4.0 km	MPC · JPL
250276	2003 GX_{56}	—	April 7, 2003	Kitt Peak	Spacewatch	·	4.0 km	MPC · JPL
250277	2003 HR_{4}	—	April 24, 2003	Anderson Mesa	LONEOS	·	950 m	MPC · JPL
250278	2003 HC_{19}	—	April 26, 2003	Kitt Peak	Spacewatch	·	3.7 km	MPC · JPL
250279	2003 HL_{25}	—	April 25, 2003	Kitt Peak	Spacewatch	·	740 m	MPC · JPL
250280	2003 HE_{27}	—	April 27, 2003	Anderson Mesa	LONEOS	·	1.2 km	MPC · JPL
250281	2003 HM_{31}	—	April 26, 2003	Kitt Peak	Spacewatch	·	720 m	MPC · JPL
250282	2003 HS_{57}	—	April 25, 2003	Kitt Peak	Spacewatch	·	740 m	MPC · JPL
250283	2003 HD_{58}	—	April 30, 2003	Socorro	LINEAR	·	1.1 km	MPC · JPL
250284	2003 JJ_{8}	—	May 2, 2003	Socorro	LINEAR	·	3.8 km	MPC · JPL
250285	2003 KG_{14}	—	May 25, 2003	Kitt Peak	Spacewatch	THM	3.4 km	MPC · JPL
250286	2003 OQ_{3}	—	July 21, 2003	Haleakala	NEAT	·	1.7 km	MPC · JPL
250287	2003 OO_{13}	—	July 28, 2003	Reedy Creek	J. Broughton	·	1.0 km	MPC · JPL
250288	2003 OG_{27}	—	July 24, 2003	Palomar	NEAT	·	1.1 km	MPC · JPL
250289	2003 ON_{28}	—	July 24, 2003	Palomar	NEAT	V	670 m	MPC · JPL
250290	2003 OZ_{31}	—	July 25, 2003	Socorro	LINEAR	·	1.3 km	MPC · JPL
250291	2003 PZ_{6}	—	August 1, 2003	Haleakala	NEAT	·	920 m	MPC · JPL
250292	2003 PV_{12}	—	August 1, 2003	Socorro	LINEAR	(2076)	1.4 km	MPC · JPL
250293	2003 QA_{2}	—	August 19, 2003	Campo Imperatore	CINEOS	·	850 m	MPC · JPL
250294	2003 QJ_{2}	—	August 19, 2003	Campo Imperatore	CINEOS	·	1.0 km	MPC · JPL
250295	2003 QR_{4}	—	August 19, 2003	Campo Imperatore	CINEOS	·	1.2 km	MPC · JPL
250296	2003 QV_{12}	—	August 22, 2003	Haleakala	NEAT	·	1.0 km	MPC · JPL
250297	2003 QT_{15}	—	August 20, 2003	Palomar	NEAT	V	1.0 km	MPC · JPL
250298	2003 QM_{18}	—	August 22, 2003	Socorro	LINEAR	·	2.4 km	MPC · JPL
250299	2003 QF_{25}	—	August 22, 2003	Palomar	NEAT	·	1.0 km	MPC · JPL
250300	2003 QK_{29}	—	August 23, 2003	Črni Vrh	Skvarč, J.	·	1.2 km	MPC · JPL

== 250301–250400 ==
back to top

Designation			Discovery			Properties		Ref
Permanent	Provisional	Named after	Date	Site	Discoverer(s)	Category	Diam.	Ref
250301	2003 QR_{37}	—	August 22, 2003	Palomar	NEAT	(2076)	1.5 km	MPC · JPL
250302	2003 QM_{39}	—	August 22, 2003	Socorro	LINEAR	·	960 m	MPC · JPL
250303	2003 QS_{44}	—	August 23, 2003	Palomar	NEAT	·	960 m	MPC · JPL
250304	2003 QB_{55}	—	August 23, 2003	Socorro	LINEAR	·	920 m	MPC · JPL
250305	2003 QD_{59}	—	August 23, 2003	Socorro	LINEAR	·	1.1 km	MPC · JPL
250306	2003 QV_{59}	—	August 23, 2003	Socorro	LINEAR	·	1.3 km	MPC · JPL
250307	2003 QA_{63}	—	August 23, 2003	Socorro	LINEAR	·	1.2 km	MPC · JPL
250308	2003 QT_{67}	—	August 24, 2003	Socorro	LINEAR	·	840 m	MPC · JPL
250309	2003 QD_{76}	—	August 24, 2003	Socorro	LINEAR	·	1.1 km	MPC · JPL
250310	2003 QO_{78}	—	August 24, 2003	Socorro	LINEAR	·	1.4 km	MPC · JPL
250311	2003 QG_{80}	—	August 22, 2003	Palomar	NEAT	·	1.0 km	MPC · JPL
250312	2003 QH_{87}	—	August 25, 2003	Socorro	LINEAR	V	970 m	MPC · JPL
250313	2003 QW_{103}	—	August 31, 2003	Haleakala	NEAT	(2076)	1.3 km	MPC · JPL
250314	2003 QG_{105}	—	August 31, 2003	Haleakala	NEAT	·	1.1 km	MPC · JPL
250315	2003 QZ_{107}	—	August 31, 2003	Haleakala	NEAT	·	1.1 km	MPC · JPL
250316	2003 RX_{6}	—	September 4, 2003	Kitt Peak	Spacewatch	·	900 m	MPC · JPL
250317	2003 RO_{15}	—	September 15, 2003	Palomar	NEAT	·	1.3 km	MPC · JPL
250318	2003 RT_{22}	—	September 15, 2003	Haleakala	NEAT	·	910 m	MPC · JPL
250319	2003 RY_{26}	—	September 2, 2003	Socorro	LINEAR	·	660 m	MPC · JPL
250320	2003 SN_{3}	—	September 16, 2003	Palomar	NEAT	NYS	1.1 km	MPC · JPL
250321	2003 SX_{3}	—	September 16, 2003	Kitt Peak	Spacewatch	·	1.1 km	MPC · JPL
250322	2003 SC_{7}	—	September 17, 2003	Kitt Peak	Spacewatch	·	1.2 km	MPC · JPL
250323	2003 SV_{12}	—	September 16, 2003	Kitt Peak	Spacewatch	NYS ·	2.2 km	MPC · JPL
250324	2003 SW_{15}	—	September 16, 2003	Kitt Peak	Spacewatch	·	1.4 km	MPC · JPL
250325	2003 SH_{50}	—	September 18, 2003	Palomar	NEAT	·	1.4 km	MPC · JPL
250326	2003 SP_{71}	—	September 18, 2003	Kitt Peak	Spacewatch	·	1.6 km	MPC · JPL
250327	2003 SH_{75}	—	September 18, 2003	Kitt Peak	Spacewatch	·	1.4 km	MPC · JPL
250328	2003 SX_{75}	—	September 18, 2003	Kitt Peak	Spacewatch	·	1.4 km	MPC · JPL
250329	2003 SO_{76}	—	September 18, 2003	Kitt Peak	Spacewatch	·	1.5 km	MPC · JPL
250330	2003 SA_{84}	—	September 19, 2003	Desert Eagle	W. K. Y. Yeung	NYS	1.2 km	MPC · JPL
250331	2003 SQ_{87}	—	September 17, 2003	Palomar	NEAT	·	2.8 km	MPC · JPL
250332	2003 SV_{93}	—	September 18, 2003	Kitt Peak	Spacewatch	·	2.6 km	MPC · JPL
250333	2003 SM_{105}	—	September 20, 2003	Kitt Peak	Spacewatch	·	1.2 km	MPC · JPL
250334	2003 SP_{111}	—	September 20, 2003	Socorro	LINEAR	ERI	2.0 km	MPC · JPL
250335	2003 SV_{117}	—	September 16, 2003	Kitt Peak	Spacewatch	·	1.3 km	MPC · JPL
250336	2003 SC_{119}	—	September 16, 2003	Palomar	NEAT	V	1.0 km	MPC · JPL
250337	2003 SP_{142}	—	September 20, 2003	Socorro	LINEAR	V	940 m	MPC · JPL
250338	2003 SP_{146}	—	September 20, 2003	Palomar	NEAT	·	2.2 km	MPC · JPL
250339	2003 SE_{151}	—	September 17, 2003	Socorro	LINEAR	·	1.6 km	MPC · JPL
250340	2003 SV_{153}	—	September 19, 2003	Anderson Mesa	LONEOS	·	1.6 km	MPC · JPL
250341	2003 SY_{155}	—	September 19, 2003	Anderson Mesa	LONEOS	·	1.7 km	MPC · JPL
250342	2003 SQ_{156}	—	September 19, 2003	Anderson Mesa	LONEOS	NYS	1.3 km	MPC · JPL
250343	2003 ST_{178}	—	September 19, 2003	Socorro	LINEAR	·	1.1 km	MPC · JPL
250344	2003 SQ_{183}	—	September 21, 2003	Socorro	LINEAR	·	2.1 km	MPC · JPL
250345	2003 SE_{185}	—	September 21, 2003	Haleakala	NEAT	V	770 m	MPC · JPL
250346	2003 SM_{195}	—	September 20, 2003	Palomar	NEAT	V	830 m	MPC · JPL
250347	2003 SN_{195}	—	September 20, 2003	Palomar	NEAT	·	1.6 km	MPC · JPL
250348	2003 SE_{199}	—	September 21, 2003	Anderson Mesa	LONEOS	·	1.9 km	MPC · JPL
250349	2003 SO_{205}	—	September 24, 2003	Haleakala	NEAT	·	1.5 km	MPC · JPL
250350	2003 SW_{206}	—	September 26, 2003	Socorro	LINEAR	NYS	1.8 km	MPC · JPL
250351	2003 SA_{212}	—	September 25, 2003	Palomar	NEAT	(2076)	1.4 km	MPC · JPL
250352	2003 SA_{217}	—	September 27, 2003	Junk Bond	Junk Bond	·	2.0 km	MPC · JPL
250353	2003 ST_{220}	—	September 29, 2003	Desert Eagle	W. K. Y. Yeung	MAS	960 m	MPC · JPL
250354 Lewicdeparis	2003 SP_{244}	Lewicdeparis	September 25, 2003	Saint-Sulpice	B. Christophe	·	1.0 km	MPC · JPL
250355	2003 SK_{250}	—	September 26, 2003	Socorro	LINEAR	PHO	1.6 km	MPC · JPL
250356	2003 SF_{252}	—	September 26, 2003	Socorro	LINEAR	·	1.2 km	MPC · JPL
250357	2003 SN_{255}	—	September 27, 2003	Kitt Peak	Spacewatch	·	1.7 km	MPC · JPL
250358	2003 SY_{258}	—	September 28, 2003	Kitt Peak	Spacewatch	·	1.7 km	MPC · JPL
250359	2003 SL_{271}	—	September 25, 2003	Haleakala	NEAT	·	1.3 km	MPC · JPL
250360	2003 SP_{272}	—	September 27, 2003	Socorro	LINEAR	V	850 m	MPC · JPL
250361	2003 SS_{272}	—	September 27, 2003	Socorro	LINEAR	·	1.0 km	MPC · JPL
250362	2003 SS_{296}	—	September 29, 2003	Anderson Mesa	LONEOS	·	1.7 km	MPC · JPL
250363	2003 SH_{303}	—	September 17, 2003	Palomar	NEAT	V	1.1 km	MPC · JPL
250364	2003 SY_{306}	—	September 30, 2003	Kitt Peak	Spacewatch	·	1.7 km	MPC · JPL
250365	2003 SJ_{307}	—	September 26, 2003	Socorro	LINEAR	·	2.4 km	MPC · JPL
250366	2003 ST_{311}	—	September 29, 2003	Socorro	LINEAR	·	1.5 km	MPC · JPL
250367	2003 SD_{321}	—	September 19, 2003	Socorro	LINEAR	·	870 m	MPC · JPL
250368	2003 SS_{366}	—	September 26, 2003	Apache Point	SDSS	·	760 m	MPC · JPL
250369	2003 TY	—	October 4, 2003	Fountain Hills	C. W. Juels, P. R. Holvorcem	·	1.6 km	MPC · JPL
250370 Obertocitterio	2003 TK_{4}	Obertocitterio	October 12, 2003	Mauna Kea	F. Bernardi	PHO	1.6 km	MPC · JPL
250371	2003 TW_{4}	—	October 1, 2003	Kitt Peak	Spacewatch	·	3.0 km	MPC · JPL
250372	2003 TS_{15}	—	October 15, 2003	Anderson Mesa	LONEOS	·	1.5 km	MPC · JPL
250373	2003 TU_{15}	—	October 15, 2003	Anderson Mesa	LONEOS	·	1.5 km	MPC · JPL
250374 Jírovec	2003 UL_{4}	Jírovec	October 17, 2003	Kleť	KLENOT	NYS	1.9 km	MPC · JPL
250375	2003 UU_{23}	—	October 22, 2003	Kitt Peak	Spacewatch	·	2.2 km	MPC · JPL
250376	2003 UW_{34}	—	October 21, 2003	Socorro	LINEAR	·	1.8 km	MPC · JPL
250377	2003 UH_{40}	—	October 16, 2003	Kitt Peak	Spacewatch	·	1.3 km	MPC · JPL
250378	2003 UF_{41}	—	October 16, 2003	Anderson Mesa	LONEOS	·	2.0 km	MPC · JPL
250379	2003 UU_{55}	—	October 17, 2003	Kitt Peak	Spacewatch	·	1.5 km	MPC · JPL
250380	2003 UW_{58}	—	October 16, 2003	Kitt Peak	Spacewatch	·	1.3 km	MPC · JPL
250381	2003 UV_{70}	—	October 18, 2003	Haleakala	NEAT	NYS	1.6 km	MPC · JPL
250382	2003 UA_{76}	—	October 17, 2003	Kitt Peak	Spacewatch	·	1.1 km	MPC · JPL
250383	2003 UR_{92}	—	October 20, 2003	Palomar	NEAT	·	1.5 km	MPC · JPL
250384	2003 UY_{93}	—	October 18, 2003	Kitt Peak	Spacewatch	·	1.8 km	MPC · JPL
250385	2003 UW_{111}	—	October 20, 2003	Socorro	LINEAR	·	2.9 km	MPC · JPL
250386	2003 UA_{130}	—	October 18, 2003	Palomar	NEAT	·	1.4 km	MPC · JPL
250387	2003 UK_{130}	—	October 18, 2003	Palomar	NEAT	·	1.5 km	MPC · JPL
250388	2003 UC_{145}	—	October 18, 2003	Anderson Mesa	LONEOS	MAS	1.0 km	MPC · JPL
250389	2003 UX_{146}	—	October 18, 2003	Anderson Mesa	LONEOS	·	2.2 km	MPC · JPL
250390	2003 UQ_{147}	—	October 18, 2003	Kitt Peak	Spacewatch	·	1.3 km	MPC · JPL
250391	2003 UZ_{151}	—	October 21, 2003	Kitt Peak	Spacewatch	·	2.1 km	MPC · JPL
250392	2003 UZ_{152}	—	October 21, 2003	Palomar	NEAT	·	1.5 km	MPC · JPL
250393	2003 UJ_{158}	—	October 20, 2003	Palomar	NEAT	·	1.2 km	MPC · JPL
250394	2003 UG_{164}	—	October 21, 2003	Socorro	LINEAR	NYS	1.4 km	MPC · JPL
250395	2003 UX_{168}	—	October 22, 2003	Socorro	LINEAR	MAS	1.2 km	MPC · JPL
250396	2003 UX_{173}	—	October 21, 2003	Anderson Mesa	LONEOS	·	4.0 km	MPC · JPL
250397	2003 UZ_{181}	—	October 21, 2003	Kitt Peak	Spacewatch	V	930 m	MPC · JPL
250398	2003 UL_{182}	—	October 21, 2003	Palomar	NEAT	·	920 m	MPC · JPL
250399	2003 UN_{183}	—	October 21, 2003	Palomar	NEAT	·	1.5 km	MPC · JPL
250400	2003 UQ_{186}	—	October 22, 2003	Socorro	LINEAR	·	1.6 km	MPC · JPL

== 250401–250500 ==
back to top

Designation			Discovery			Properties		Ref
Permanent	Provisional	Named after	Date	Site	Discoverer(s)	Category	Diam.	Ref
250401	2003 US_{188}	—	October 22, 2003	Kitt Peak	Spacewatch	(2076)	1.5 km	MPC · JPL
250402	2003 UP_{205}	—	October 22, 2003	Haleakala	NEAT	·	1.6 km	MPC · JPL
250403	2003 UR_{212}	—	October 23, 2003	Kitt Peak	Spacewatch	NYS	1.4 km	MPC · JPL
250404	2003 UW_{218}	—	October 21, 2003	Kitt Peak	Spacewatch	·	1.6 km	MPC · JPL
250405	2003 UV_{222}	—	October 22, 2003	Socorro	LINEAR	·	1.8 km	MPC · JPL
250406	2003 UX_{226}	—	October 23, 2003	Kitt Peak	Spacewatch	·	1.9 km	MPC · JPL
250407	2003 UU_{237}	—	October 23, 2003	Kitt Peak	Spacewatch	(6769)	1.5 km	MPC · JPL
250408	2003 UQ_{242}	—	October 24, 2003	Socorro	LINEAR	·	1.7 km	MPC · JPL
250409	2003 UN_{243}	—	October 24, 2003	Socorro	LINEAR	·	1.3 km	MPC · JPL
250410	2003 UD_{252}	—	October 26, 2003	Catalina	CSS	·	1.7 km	MPC · JPL
250411	2003 UR_{256}	—	October 25, 2003	Socorro	LINEAR	·	1.3 km	MPC · JPL
250412	2003 UU_{269}	—	October 29, 2003	Catalina	CSS	·	2.0 km	MPC · JPL
250413	2003 UJ_{275}	—	October 29, 2003	Socorro	LINEAR	MAS	870 m	MPC · JPL
250414	2003 UB_{276}	—	October 29, 2003	Catalina	CSS	·	1.8 km	MPC · JPL
250415	2003 UH_{330}	—	October 17, 2003	Kitt Peak	Spacewatch	·	1.6 km	MPC · JPL
250416	2003 UK_{333}	—	October 18, 2003	Apache Point	SDSS	·	950 m	MPC · JPL
250417	2003 UF_{342}	—	October 19, 2003	Apache Point	SDSS	V	840 m	MPC · JPL
250418	2003 VV_{2}	—	November 6, 2003	Socorro	LINEAR	·	2.1 km	MPC · JPL
250419	2003 VW_{11}	—	November 3, 2003	Socorro	LINEAR	·	1.6 km	MPC · JPL
250420	2003 WO_{6}	—	November 16, 2003	Catalina	CSS	·	2.0 km	MPC · JPL
250421	2003 WE_{37}	—	November 19, 2003	Socorro	LINEAR	·	1.6 km	MPC · JPL
250422	2003 WH_{39}	—	November 19, 2003	Kitt Peak	Spacewatch	·	4.0 km	MPC · JPL
250423	2003 WH_{62}	—	November 19, 2003	Kitt Peak	Spacewatch	·	2.0 km	MPC · JPL
250424	2003 WV_{68}	—	November 19, 2003	Kitt Peak	Spacewatch	·	900 m	MPC · JPL
250425	2003 WQ_{71}	—	November 20, 2003	Socorro	LINEAR	·	2.1 km	MPC · JPL
250426	2003 WR_{85}	—	November 20, 2003	Socorro	LINEAR	·	1.6 km	MPC · JPL
250427	2003 WR_{86}	—	November 21, 2003	Socorro	LINEAR	·	1.3 km	MPC · JPL
250428	2003 WP_{90}	—	November 16, 2003	Kitt Peak	Spacewatch	·	1.5 km	MPC · JPL
250429	2003 WG_{92}	—	November 18, 2003	Palomar	NEAT	·	1.7 km	MPC · JPL
250430	2003 WC_{95}	—	November 19, 2003	Anderson Mesa	LONEOS	V	730 m	MPC · JPL
250431	2003 WL_{117}	—	November 20, 2003	Socorro	LINEAR	·	3.3 km	MPC · JPL
250432	2003 WO_{124}	—	November 20, 2003	Socorro	LINEAR	·	1.7 km	MPC · JPL
250433	2003 WR_{126}	—	November 20, 2003	Socorro	LINEAR	·	2.2 km	MPC · JPL
250434	2003 WU_{132}	—	November 21, 2003	Socorro	LINEAR	NYS	1.7 km	MPC · JPL
250435	2003 WG_{133}	—	November 21, 2003	Socorro	LINEAR	·	1.4 km	MPC · JPL
250436	2003 WT_{137}	—	November 21, 2003	Socorro	LINEAR	·	1.6 km	MPC · JPL
250437	2003 WS_{168}	—	November 19, 2003	Palomar	NEAT	ERI	1.9 km	MPC · JPL
250438	2003 WZ_{169}	—	November 20, 2003	Catalina	CSS	·	2.0 km	MPC · JPL
250439	2003 XG_{16}	—	December 14, 2003	Palomar	NEAT	·	2.2 km	MPC · JPL
250440	2003 XY_{16}	—	December 14, 2003	Palomar	NEAT	·	1.7 km	MPC · JPL
250441	2003 XM_{27}	—	December 1, 2003	Socorro	LINEAR	·	1.9 km	MPC · JPL
250442	2003 YH_{20}	—	December 17, 2003	Kitt Peak	Spacewatch	NYS	1.6 km	MPC · JPL
250443	2003 YA_{52}	—	December 18, 2003	Socorro	LINEAR	·	1.6 km	MPC · JPL
250444	2003 YA_{56}	—	December 19, 2003	Socorro	LINEAR	·	2.1 km	MPC · JPL
250445	2003 YQ_{56}	—	December 19, 2003	Socorro	LINEAR	MAS	840 m	MPC · JPL
250446	2003 YJ_{67}	—	December 19, 2003	Kitt Peak	Spacewatch	MAS	980 m	MPC · JPL
250447	2003 YE_{92}	—	December 21, 2003	Socorro	LINEAR	NYS	1.4 km	MPC · JPL
250448	2003 YR_{122}	—	December 27, 2003	Socorro	LINEAR	CLA	2.3 km	MPC · JPL
250449	2003 YY_{125}	—	December 27, 2003	Socorro	LINEAR	PHO	1.3 km	MPC · JPL
250450	2003 YZ_{126}	—	December 27, 2003	Socorro	LINEAR	·	2.0 km	MPC · JPL
250451	2003 YJ_{128}	—	December 27, 2003	Socorro	LINEAR	·	1.6 km	MPC · JPL
250452	2003 YU_{142}	—	December 28, 2003	Socorro	LINEAR	·	2.0 km	MPC · JPL
250453	2003 YM_{160}	—	December 17, 2003	Socorro	LINEAR	SUL	3.3 km	MPC · JPL
250454	2004 AW_{1}	—	January 12, 2004	Palomar	NEAT	JUN	2.2 km	MPC · JPL
250455	2004 BH_{5}	—	January 16, 2004	Palomar	NEAT	·	1.7 km	MPC · JPL
250456	2004 BZ_{11}	—	January 16, 2004	Palomar	NEAT	NYS	1.5 km	MPC · JPL
250457	2004 BE_{35}	—	January 19, 2004	Kitt Peak	Spacewatch	·	2.4 km	MPC · JPL
250458	2004 BO_{41}	—	January 19, 2004	Socorro	LINEAR	APO +1km	630 m	MPC · JPL
250459	2004 BT_{55}	—	January 22, 2004	Socorro	LINEAR	·	1.5 km	MPC · JPL
250460	2004 BZ_{57}	—	January 23, 2004	Anderson Mesa	LONEOS	H	820 m	MPC · JPL
250461	2004 BO_{76}	—	January 25, 2004	Haleakala	NEAT	MAR	1.9 km	MPC · JPL
250462	2004 BS_{85}	—	January 28, 2004	Catalina	CSS	H	900 m	MPC · JPL
250463	2004 BQ_{88}	—	January 23, 2004	Socorro	LINEAR	·	1.8 km	MPC · JPL
250464	2004 BC_{97}	—	January 24, 2004	Socorro	LINEAR	·	2.9 km	MPC · JPL
250465	2004 BY_{121}	—	January 27, 2004	Catalina	CSS	H	880 m	MPC · JPL
250466	2004 BS_{130}	—	January 16, 2004	Kitt Peak	Spacewatch	·	1.9 km	MPC · JPL
250467	2004 BC_{133}	—	January 17, 2004	Kitt Peak	Spacewatch	NYS	1.3 km	MPC · JPL
250468	2004 BE_{152}	—	January 19, 2004	Anderson Mesa	LONEOS	·	2.2 km	MPC · JPL
250469	2004 CH_{18}	—	February 10, 2004	Catalina	CSS	NYS	1.5 km	MPC · JPL
250470	2004 CY_{28}	—	February 12, 2004	Kitt Peak	Spacewatch	·	2.3 km	MPC · JPL
250471	2004 CC_{36}	—	February 11, 2004	Palomar	NEAT	ADE	2.5 km	MPC · JPL
250472	2004 CH_{67}	—	February 10, 2004	Palomar	NEAT	·	1.3 km	MPC · JPL
250473	2004 CM_{93}	—	February 11, 2004	Palomar	NEAT	·	1.8 km	MPC · JPL
250474	2004 CU_{96}	—	February 12, 2004	Palomar	NEAT	·	1.9 km	MPC · JPL
250475	2004 CR_{129}	—	February 15, 2004	Catalina	CSS	H	680 m	MPC · JPL
250476	2004 DT_{1}	—	February 18, 2004	Socorro	LINEAR	H	690 m	MPC · JPL
250477	2004 DB_{9}	—	February 17, 2004	Socorro	LINEAR	·	3.3 km	MPC · JPL
250478	2004 DF_{10}	—	February 18, 2004	Desert Eagle	W. K. Y. Yeung	·	1.0 km	MPC · JPL
250479	2004 DW_{24}	—	February 16, 2004	Socorro	LINEAR	H	840 m	MPC · JPL
250480	2004 DX_{24}	—	February 16, 2004	Socorro	LINEAR	H	760 m	MPC · JPL
250481	2004 DU_{58}	—	February 23, 2004	Socorro	LINEAR	·	2.8 km	MPC · JPL
250482	2004 DF_{79}	—	February 18, 2004	Calar Alto	Calar Alto	MIS	3.1 km	MPC · JPL
250483	2004 ED_{5}	—	March 11, 2004	Palomar	NEAT	WIT	1.3 km	MPC · JPL
250484	2004 ED_{31}	—	March 15, 2004	Catalina	CSS	H	670 m	MPC · JPL
250485	2004 EW_{32}	—	March 15, 2004	Palomar	NEAT	·	3.7 km	MPC · JPL
250486	2004 EY_{33}	—	March 12, 2004	Palomar	NEAT	HNS	1.5 km	MPC · JPL
250487	2004 EP_{37}	—	March 14, 2004	Palomar	NEAT	·	2.3 km	MPC · JPL
250488	2004 EJ_{49}	—	March 15, 2004	Catalina	CSS	·	2.1 km	MPC · JPL
250489	2004 EM_{58}	—	March 15, 2004	Socorro	LINEAR	·	2.6 km	MPC · JPL
250490	2004 EF_{71}	—	March 15, 2004	Catalina	CSS	·	2.6 km	MPC · JPL
250491	2004 EX_{83}	—	March 14, 2004	Palomar	NEAT	·	2.8 km	MPC · JPL
250492	2004 FN_{3}	—	March 17, 2004	Socorro	LINEAR	H	870 m	MPC · JPL
250493	2004 FN_{13}	—	March 16, 2004	Kitt Peak	Spacewatch	EUN	1.8 km	MPC · JPL
250494	2004 FW_{30}	—	March 29, 2004	Socorro	LINEAR	H	730 m	MPC · JPL
250495	2004 FD_{36}	—	March 16, 2004	Socorro	LINEAR	·	2.6 km	MPC · JPL
250496	2004 FN_{43}	—	March 19, 2004	Socorro	LINEAR	·	2.9 km	MPC · JPL
250497	2004 FL_{108}	—	March 23, 2004	Kitt Peak	Spacewatch	·	1.7 km	MPC · JPL
250498	2004 FN_{112}	—	March 26, 2004	Kitt Peak	Spacewatch	·	2.1 km	MPC · JPL
250499	2004 FW_{149}	—	March 16, 2004	Kitt Peak	Spacewatch	·	2.9 km	MPC · JPL
250500	2004 FR_{158}	—	March 18, 2004	Kitt Peak	Spacewatch	·	2.7 km	MPC · JPL

== 250501–250600 ==
back to top

Designation			Discovery			Properties		Ref
Permanent	Provisional	Named after	Date	Site	Discoverer(s)	Category	Diam.	Ref
250501	2004 GH_{1}	—	April 9, 2004	Siding Spring	SSS	NEM	3.3 km	MPC · JPL
250502	2004 GJ_{4}	—	April 11, 2004	Palomar	NEAT	·	3.2 km	MPC · JPL
250503	2004 GY_{4}	—	April 11, 2004	Palomar	NEAT	·	2.7 km	MPC · JPL
250504	2004 GP_{5}	—	April 11, 2004	Catalina	CSS	·	5.1 km	MPC · JPL
250505	2004 GW_{40}	—	April 12, 2004	Kitt Peak	Spacewatch	·	4.4 km	MPC · JPL
250506	2004 GD_{45}	—	April 12, 2004	Kitt Peak	Spacewatch	DOR	3.0 km	MPC · JPL
250507	2004 HE_{2}	—	April 16, 2004	Socorro	LINEAR	H	790 m	MPC · JPL
250508	2004 HR_{18}	—	April 17, 2004	Siding Spring	SSS	·	3.1 km	MPC · JPL
250509	2004 HX_{28}	—	April 20, 2004	Socorro	LINEAR	AGN	1.8 km	MPC · JPL
250510	2004 HC_{78}	—	April 16, 2004	Socorro	LINEAR	·	4.2 km	MPC · JPL
250511	2004 JK_{29}	—	May 15, 2004	Socorro	LINEAR	·	2.9 km	MPC · JPL
250512	2004 LW_{6}	—	June 11, 2004	Socorro	LINEAR	·	4.4 km	MPC · JPL
250513	2004 MY_{4}	—	June 22, 2004	Reedy Creek	J. Broughton	·	4.9 km	MPC · JPL
250514	2004 NA_{4}	—	July 12, 2004	Palomar	NEAT	fast	3.1 km	MPC · JPL
250515	2004 NM_{5}	—	July 10, 2004	Palomar	NEAT	URS	5.1 km	MPC · JPL
250516	2004 NY_{21}	—	July 15, 2004	Socorro	LINEAR	·	5.1 km	MPC · JPL
250517	2004 NC_{22}	—	July 10, 2004	Catalina	CSS	T_{j} (2.98)	6.9 km	MPC · JPL
250518	2004 NE_{31}	—	July 11, 2004	Anderson Mesa	LONEOS	·	4.7 km	MPC · JPL
250519	2004 OV_{3}	—	July 17, 2004	Socorro	LINEAR	·	4.4 km	MPC · JPL
250520	2004 OZ_{8}	—	July 18, 2004	Siding Spring	SSS	·	6.2 km	MPC · JPL
250521	2004 PT	—	August 6, 2004	Palomar	NEAT	·	5.3 km	MPC · JPL
250522	2004 PQ_{20}	—	August 6, 2004	Palomar	NEAT	·	2.9 km	MPC · JPL
250523	2004 PV_{33}	—	August 8, 2004	Anderson Mesa	LONEOS	LIX	4.8 km	MPC · JPL
250524	2004 PR_{39}	—	August 9, 2004	Socorro	LINEAR	·	5.5 km	MPC · JPL
250525	2004 PY_{39}	—	August 9, 2004	Socorro	LINEAR	TIR	2.4 km	MPC · JPL
250526 Steinerzsuzsanna	2004 PO_{42}	Steinerzsuzsanna	August 11, 2004	Piszkéstető	K. Sárneczky, Szalai, T.	·	3.4 km	MPC · JPL
250527	2004 PH_{49}	—	August 8, 2004	Palomar	NEAT	·	5.0 km	MPC · JPL
250528	2004 PO_{54}	—	August 8, 2004	Anderson Mesa	LONEOS	·	4.4 km	MPC · JPL
250529	2004 PT_{75}	—	August 8, 2004	Campo Imperatore	CINEOS	·	6.5 km	MPC · JPL
250530	2004 PM_{79}	—	August 9, 2004	Socorro	LINEAR	·	3.9 km	MPC · JPL
250531	2004 PG_{92}	—	August 12, 2004	Palomar	NEAT	TIR ·	2.9 km	MPC · JPL
250532	2004 PM_{104}	—	August 13, 2004	Palomar	NEAT	·	3.5 km	MPC · JPL
250533	2004 PU_{111}	—	August 11, 2004	Palomar	NEAT	·	4.2 km	MPC · JPL
250534	2004 QW_{4}	—	August 21, 2004	Goodricke-Pigott	R. A. Tucker	·	4.1 km	MPC · JPL
250535	2004 QA_{5}	—	August 17, 2004	Socorro	LINEAR	·	5.5 km	MPC · JPL
250536	2004 QJ_{9}	—	August 20, 2004	Siding Spring	SSS	·	4.7 km	MPC · JPL
250537	2004 QL_{14}	—	August 21, 2004	Catalina	CSS	·	7.6 km	MPC · JPL
250538	2004 QE_{15}	—	August 22, 2004	Kitt Peak	Spacewatch	·	4.1 km	MPC · JPL
250539	2004 QJ_{25}	—	August 25, 2004	Socorro	LINEAR	T_{j} (2.99)	4.3 km	MPC · JPL
250540	2004 QL_{27}	—	August 23, 2004	Anderson Mesa	LONEOS	·	3.3 km	MPC · JPL
250541	2004 RR_{2}	—	September 5, 2004	Bergisch Gladbach	W. Bickel	·	4.6 km	MPC · JPL
250542	2004 RK_{12}	—	September 8, 2004	Socorro	LINEAR	·	4.4 km	MPC · JPL
250543	2004 RG_{21}	—	September 7, 2004	Kitt Peak	Spacewatch	·	5.4 km	MPC · JPL
250544	2004 RM_{33}	—	September 7, 2004	Socorro	LINEAR	·	5.5 km	MPC · JPL
250545	2004 RY_{59}	—	September 8, 2004	Socorro	LINEAR	fast	4.0 km	MPC · JPL
250546	2004 RX_{71}	—	September 8, 2004	Socorro	LINEAR	·	6.2 km	MPC · JPL
250547	2004 RM_{84}	—	September 9, 2004	Altschwendt	W. Ries	·	5.3 km	MPC · JPL
250548	2004 RO_{86}	—	September 7, 2004	Socorro	LINEAR	·	5.0 km	MPC · JPL
250549	2004 RA_{88}	—	September 7, 2004	Kitt Peak	Spacewatch	·	5.4 km	MPC · JPL
250550	2004 RJ_{90}	—	September 8, 2004	Socorro	LINEAR	·	4.6 km	MPC · JPL
250551	2004 RM_{123}	—	September 7, 2004	Palomar	NEAT	·	6.4 km	MPC · JPL
250552	2004 RP_{123}	—	September 7, 2004	Palomar	NEAT	·	3.5 km	MPC · JPL
250553	2004 RC_{138}	—	September 8, 2004	Palomar	NEAT	·	3.6 km	MPC · JPL
250554	2004 RL_{157}	—	September 10, 2004	Socorro	LINEAR	·	5.2 km	MPC · JPL
250555	2004 RY_{159}	—	September 10, 2004	Socorro	LINEAR	·	5.0 km	MPC · JPL
250556	2004 RO_{162}	—	September 11, 2004	Socorro	LINEAR	·	3.2 km	MPC · JPL
250557	2004 RW_{174}	—	September 10, 2004	Socorro	LINEAR	·	5.4 km	MPC · JPL
250558	2004 RZ_{175}	—	September 10, 2004	Socorro	LINEAR	·	6.0 km	MPC · JPL
250559	2004 RB_{190}	—	September 10, 2004	Socorro	LINEAR	·	5.5 km	MPC · JPL
250560	2004 RL_{193}	—	September 10, 2004	Socorro	LINEAR	LIX	11 km	MPC · JPL
250561	2004 RW_{224}	—	September 9, 2004	Socorro	LINEAR	·	3.2 km	MPC · JPL
250562	2004 RW_{252}	—	September 15, 2004	Socorro	LINEAR	EUP	6.8 km	MPC · JPL
250563	2004 RG_{305}	—	September 12, 2004	Kitt Peak	Spacewatch	·	4.7 km	MPC · JPL
250564	2004 RG_{318}	—	September 12, 2004	Kitt Peak	Spacewatch	·	3.7 km	MPC · JPL
250565	2004 RL_{335}	—	September 15, 2004	Siding Spring	SSS	·	2.5 km	MPC · JPL
250566	2004 SZ_{33}	—	September 17, 2004	Kitt Peak	Spacewatch	·	5.2 km	MPC · JPL
250567	2004 TH_{78}	—	October 4, 2004	Socorro	LINEAR	LUT	7.6 km	MPC · JPL
250568	2004 TA_{117}	—	October 5, 2004	Anderson Mesa	LONEOS	·	6.5 km	MPC · JPL
250569	2004 TK_{204}	—	October 7, 2004	Kitt Peak	Spacewatch	·	1.3 km	MPC · JPL
250570	2004 TW_{314}	—	October 11, 2004	Kitt Peak	Spacewatch	·	690 m	MPC · JPL
250571	2004 TY_{323}	—	October 11, 2004	Kitt Peak	Spacewatch	CYB	6.7 km	MPC · JPL
250572	2004 WZ_{7}	—	November 19, 2004	Catalina	CSS	·	1.2 km	MPC · JPL
250573	2004 XO_{1}	—	December 1, 2004	Catalina	CSS	·	1.0 km	MPC · JPL
250574	2004 XP_{99}	—	December 12, 2004	Kitt Peak	Spacewatch	·	840 m	MPC · JPL
250575	2004 XK_{146}	—	December 14, 2004	Socorro	LINEAR	·	1.2 km	MPC · JPL
250576	2004 YB_{25}	—	December 18, 2004	Mount Lemmon	Mount Lemmon Survey	HIL · 3:2	6.4 km	MPC · JPL
250577	2005 AC	—	January 1, 2005	Catalina	CSS	APO	750 m	MPC · JPL
250578	2005 AK_{12}	—	January 6, 2005	Catalina	CSS	·	990 m	MPC · JPL
250579	2005 AF_{18}	—	January 6, 2005	Socorro	LINEAR	·	940 m	MPC · JPL
250580	2005 AY_{19}	—	January 6, 2005	Socorro	LINEAR	·	1.2 km	MPC · JPL
250581	2005 AE_{32}	—	January 11, 2005	Socorro	LINEAR	·	890 m	MPC · JPL
250582	2005 AY_{35}	—	January 13, 2005	Socorro	LINEAR	slow	1.1 km	MPC · JPL
250583	2005 AF_{41}	—	January 15, 2005	Socorro	LINEAR	·	760 m	MPC · JPL
250584	2005 AM_{68}	—	January 13, 2005	Anderson Mesa	LONEOS	PHO	1.6 km	MPC · JPL
250585	2005 AA_{82}	—	January 6, 2005	Catalina	CSS	·	1.1 km	MPC · JPL
250586	2005 BS_{16}	—	January 16, 2005	Socorro	LINEAR	·	1.2 km	MPC · JPL
250587	2005 CS_{9}	—	February 1, 2005	Kitt Peak	Spacewatch	·	2.4 km	MPC · JPL
250588	2005 CY_{18}	—	February 2, 2005	Catalina	CSS	·	980 m	MPC · JPL
250589	2005 CM_{20}	—	February 2, 2005	Catalina	CSS	·	1.3 km	MPC · JPL
250590	2005 CW_{31}	—	February 1, 2005	Kitt Peak	Spacewatch	·	1.0 km	MPC · JPL
250591	2005 CN_{68}	—	February 2, 2005	Catalina	CSS	·	1.1 km	MPC · JPL
250592	2005 CO_{80}	—	February 14, 2005	Catalina	CSS	V	970 m	MPC · JPL
250593	2005 EA_{13}	—	March 2, 2005	Catalina	CSS	·	1.5 km	MPC · JPL
250594	2005 EB_{13}	—	March 2, 2005	Catalina	CSS	(2076)	1.0 km	MPC · JPL
250595	2005 EZ_{21}	—	March 3, 2005	Catalina	CSS	·	2.0 km	MPC · JPL
250596	2005 EO_{60}	—	March 4, 2005	Catalina	CSS	·	2.2 km	MPC · JPL
250597	2005 EJ_{69}	—	March 7, 2005	Socorro	LINEAR	·	1.9 km	MPC · JPL
250598	2005 EJ_{81}	—	March 4, 2005	Kitt Peak	Spacewatch	·	1.4 km	MPC · JPL
250599	2005 EZ_{98}	—	March 3, 2005	Catalina	CSS	·	1.5 km	MPC · JPL
250600	2005 EG_{136}	—	March 9, 2005	Anderson Mesa	LONEOS	NYS	1.3 km	MPC · JPL

== 250601–250700 ==
back to top

Designation			Discovery			Properties		Ref
Permanent	Provisional	Named after	Date	Site	Discoverer(s)	Category	Diam.	Ref
250601	2005 EF_{154}	—	March 8, 2005	Socorro	LINEAR	·	2.1 km	MPC · JPL
250602	2005 EU_{157}	—	March 9, 2005	Mount Lemmon	Mount Lemmon Survey	·	1.0 km	MPC · JPL
250603	2005 EH_{158}	—	March 9, 2005	Mount Lemmon	Mount Lemmon Survey	·	1.8 km	MPC · JPL
250604	2005 EC_{177}	—	March 8, 2005	Mount Lemmon	Mount Lemmon Survey	NYS	1.7 km	MPC · JPL
250605	2005 EU_{197}	—	March 11, 2005	Mount Lemmon	Mount Lemmon Survey	NYS	1.3 km	MPC · JPL
250606 Bichat	2005 EL_{222}	Bichat	March 12, 2005	Saint-Sulpice	B. Christophe	·	1.4 km	MPC · JPL
250607	2005 EV_{234}	—	March 10, 2005	Mount Lemmon	Mount Lemmon Survey	·	880 m	MPC · JPL
250608	2005 EB_{247}	—	March 12, 2005	Kitt Peak	Spacewatch	MAS	1 km	MPC · JPL
250609	2005 EF_{247}	—	March 12, 2005	Kitt Peak	Spacewatch	·	1.2 km	MPC · JPL
250610	2005 EH_{269}	—	March 15, 2005	Mount Lemmon	Mount Lemmon Survey	EUN	1.7 km	MPC · JPL
250611	2005 ED_{280}	—	March 10, 2005	Catalina	CSS	·	2.8 km	MPC · JPL
250612	2005 EQ_{295}	—	March 3, 2005	Kitt Peak	Spacewatch	·	1.9 km	MPC · JPL
250613	2005 FU_{5}	—	March 30, 2005	Vail-Jarnac	Jarnac	·	1.8 km	MPC · JPL
250614	2005 GG	—	April 1, 2005	Socorro	LINEAR	APO +1km	1.6 km	MPC · JPL
250615	2005 GB_{10}	—	April 1, 2005	Siding Spring	SSS	·	2.2 km	MPC · JPL
250616	2005 GP_{13}	—	April 1, 2005	Anderson Mesa	LONEOS	·	1.5 km	MPC · JPL
250617	2005 GD_{27}	—	April 3, 2005	Socorro	LINEAR	·	2.7 km	MPC · JPL
250618	2005 GR_{30}	—	April 4, 2005	Mount Lemmon	Mount Lemmon Survey	PHO	1.5 km	MPC · JPL
250619	2005 GS_{52}	—	April 2, 2005	Mount Lemmon	Mount Lemmon Survey	·	1.8 km	MPC · JPL
250620	2005 GE_{59}	—	April 7, 2005	Kitt Peak	Spacewatch	APO +1km · PHA	650 m	MPC · JPL
250621	2005 GE_{79}	—	April 6, 2005	Kitt Peak	Spacewatch	·	1.2 km	MPC · JPL
250622	2005 GY_{83}	—	April 4, 2005	Kitt Peak	Spacewatch	·	1.4 km	MPC · JPL
250623	2005 GR_{95}	—	April 6, 2005	Kitt Peak	Spacewatch	·	1.6 km	MPC · JPL
250624	2005 GO_{110}	—	April 10, 2005	Mount Lemmon	Mount Lemmon Survey	·	1.5 km	MPC · JPL
250625	2005 GR_{126}	—	April 11, 2005	Mount Lemmon	Mount Lemmon Survey	EUN	1.9 km	MPC · JPL
250626	2005 GR_{136}	—	April 10, 2005	Kitt Peak	Spacewatch	·	1.3 km	MPC · JPL
250627	2005 GH_{144}	—	April 10, 2005	Kitt Peak	Spacewatch	·	1.5 km	MPC · JPL
250628	2005 GX_{157}	—	April 11, 2005	Mount Lemmon	Mount Lemmon Survey	MAS	880 m	MPC · JPL
250629	2005 GX_{169}	—	April 12, 2005	Kitt Peak	Spacewatch	·	1.6 km	MPC · JPL
250630	2005 GD_{182}	—	April 14, 2005	Catalina	CSS	·	2.2 km	MPC · JPL
250631	2005 HE_{5}	—	April 30, 2005	Kitt Peak	Spacewatch	·	2.3 km	MPC · JPL
250632	2005 JS_{12}	—	May 4, 2005	Mauna Kea	Veillet, C.	·	2.2 km	MPC · JPL
250633	2005 JC_{14}	—	May 1, 2005	Palomar	NEAT	·	2.4 km	MPC · JPL
250634	2005 JR_{25}	—	May 3, 2005	Catalina	CSS	·	3.7 km	MPC · JPL
250635	2005 JE_{36}	—	May 4, 2005	Kitt Peak	Spacewatch	·	1.8 km	MPC · JPL
250636	2005 JW_{43}	—	May 4, 2005	Anderson Mesa	LONEOS	·	2.2 km	MPC · JPL
250637	2005 JL_{47}	—	May 3, 2005	Kitt Peak	Spacewatch	PHO	1.8 km	MPC · JPL
250638	2005 JT_{60}	—	May 8, 2005	Socorro	LINEAR	·	3.1 km	MPC · JPL
250639	2005 JZ_{100}	—	May 9, 2005	Catalina	CSS	·	2.3 km	MPC · JPL
250640	2005 JL_{111}	—	May 9, 2005	Socorro	LINEAR	·	1.7 km	MPC · JPL
250641	2005 JB_{118}	—	May 10, 2005	Kitt Peak	Spacewatch	·	1.6 km	MPC · JPL
250642	2005 JN_{120}	—	May 10, 2005	Kitt Peak	Spacewatch	·	1.4 km	MPC · JPL
250643	2005 JW_{127}	—	May 12, 2005	Palomar	NEAT	·	1.7 km	MPC · JPL
250644	2005 JC_{128}	—	May 12, 2005	Socorro	LINEAR	(194)	1.7 km	MPC · JPL
250645	2005 JU_{132}	—	May 14, 2005	Kitt Peak	Spacewatch	KON	2.3 km	MPC · JPL
250646	2005 JC_{140}	—	May 14, 2005	Socorro	LINEAR	·	2.1 km	MPC · JPL
250647	2005 JQ_{140}	—	May 14, 2005	Mount Lemmon	Mount Lemmon Survey	·	1.9 km	MPC · JPL
250648	2005 JF_{148}	—	May 15, 2005	Palomar	NEAT	MAR	1.4 km	MPC · JPL
250649	2005 JW_{161}	—	May 8, 2005	Mount Lemmon	Mount Lemmon Survey	·	1.6 km	MPC · JPL
250650	2005 JX_{178}	—	May 13, 2005	Kitt Peak	Spacewatch	·	1.5 km	MPC · JPL
250651	2005 JB_{181}	—	May 14, 2005	Socorro	LINEAR	·	2.5 km	MPC · JPL
250652	2005 KD_{11}	—	May 31, 2005	Catalina	CSS	ADE	3.8 km	MPC · JPL
250653	2005 KG_{14}	—	May 31, 2005	Catalina	CSS	·	2.0 km	MPC · JPL
250654	2005 LN_{5}	—	June 2, 2005	Siding Spring	SSS	·	3.2 km	MPC · JPL
250655	2005 LJ_{26}	—	June 8, 2005	Kitt Peak	Spacewatch	KON	3.2 km	MPC · JPL
250656	2005 LZ_{36}	—	June 13, 2005	Mount Lemmon	Mount Lemmon Survey	(5)	1.6 km	MPC · JPL
250657	2005 MQ_{3}	—	June 25, 2005	Palomar	NEAT	·	5.0 km	MPC · JPL
250658	2005 MG_{11}	—	June 27, 2005	Kitt Peak	Spacewatch	·	2.2 km	MPC · JPL
250659	2005 MO_{16}	—	June 25, 2005	Palomar	NEAT	·	2.0 km	MPC · JPL
250660	2005 NN_{21}	—	July 1, 2005	Kitt Peak	Spacewatch	HOF	3.1 km	MPC · JPL
250661	2005 NU_{21}	—	July 1, 2005	Kitt Peak	Spacewatch	(13314)	3.4 km	MPC · JPL
250662	2005 NS_{22}	—	July 1, 2005	Kitt Peak	Spacewatch	·	2.4 km	MPC · JPL
250663	2005 NT_{22}	—	July 1, 2005	Kitt Peak	Spacewatch	NAE	4.1 km	MPC · JPL
250664	2005 ND_{24}	—	July 4, 2005	Kitt Peak	Spacewatch	·	3.3 km	MPC · JPL
250665	2005 NZ_{32}	—	July 5, 2005	Kitt Peak	Spacewatch	·	3.2 km	MPC · JPL
250666	2005 NL_{61}	—	July 11, 2005	Kitt Peak	Spacewatch	KOR	1.5 km	MPC · JPL
250667	2005 NQ_{67}	—	July 3, 2005	Mount Lemmon	Mount Lemmon Survey	·	1.7 km	MPC · JPL
250668	2005 NA_{73}	—	July 8, 2005	Kitt Peak	Spacewatch	BRA	1.9 km	MPC · JPL
250669	2005 NE_{109}	—	July 7, 2005	Mauna Kea	Veillet, C.	·	1.7 km	MPC · JPL
250670	2005 NO_{124}	—	July 1, 2005	Kitt Peak	Spacewatch	·	1.8 km	MPC · JPL
250671	2005 OX_{7}	—	July 30, 2005	Campo Imperatore	CINEOS	·	2.7 km	MPC · JPL
250672	2005 ON_{21}	—	July 28, 2005	Palomar	NEAT	AST	2.1 km	MPC · JPL
250673	2005 ON_{22}	—	July 31, 2005	Siding Spring	SSS	·	3.2 km	MPC · JPL
250674	2005 OV_{22}	—	July 29, 2005	Reedy Creek	J. Broughton	DOR	4.9 km	MPC · JPL
250675	2005 OV_{25}	—	July 31, 2005	Palomar	NEAT	·	2.7 km	MPC · JPL
250676	2005 PU_{3}	—	August 6, 2005	Reedy Creek	J. Broughton	·	2.0 km	MPC · JPL
250677	2005 PC_{22}	—	August 6, 2005	Palomar	NEAT	·	2.6 km	MPC · JPL
250678	2005 PK_{23}	—	August 9, 2005	Cerro Tololo	M. W. Buie	·	2.0 km	MPC · JPL
250679	2005 QM_{2}	—	August 24, 2005	Palomar	NEAT	·	3.6 km	MPC · JPL
250680	2005 QC_{5}	—	August 26, 2005	Siding Spring	SSS	ATE · PHA	400 m	MPC · JPL
250681	2005 QA_{9}	—	August 25, 2005	Palomar	NEAT	·	2.1 km	MPC · JPL
250682	2005 QT_{16}	—	August 25, 2005	Palomar	NEAT	·	2.3 km	MPC · JPL
250683	2005 QD_{31}	—	August 22, 2005	Palomar	NEAT	·	3.2 km	MPC · JPL
250684	2005 QB_{35}	—	August 25, 2005	Palomar	NEAT	KOR	2.0 km	MPC · JPL
250685	2005 QC_{40}	—	August 26, 2005	Palomar	NEAT	·	3.3 km	MPC · JPL
250686	2005 QK_{43}	—	August 26, 2005	Palomar	NEAT	EOS	2.2 km	MPC · JPL
250687	2005 QW_{51}	—	August 27, 2005	Anderson Mesa	LONEOS	·	2.2 km	MPC · JPL
250688	2005 QX_{94}	—	August 27, 2005	Palomar	NEAT	·	2.1 km	MPC · JPL
250689	2005 QC_{102}	—	August 27, 2005	Palomar	NEAT	·	4.9 km	MPC · JPL
250690	2005 QH_{103}	—	August 27, 2005	Palomar	NEAT	·	3.0 km	MPC · JPL
250691	2005 QZ_{114}	—	August 27, 2005	Palomar	NEAT	·	2.2 km	MPC · JPL
250692	2005 QA_{115}	—	August 27, 2005	Palomar	NEAT	EOS	2.6 km	MPC · JPL
250693	2005 QX_{116}	—	August 28, 2005	Kitt Peak	Spacewatch	HOF	2.7 km	MPC · JPL
250694	2005 QX_{122}	—	August 28, 2005	Kitt Peak	Spacewatch	KOR	1.9 km	MPC · JPL
250695	2005 QN_{129}	—	August 28, 2005	Kitt Peak	Spacewatch	·	4.3 km	MPC · JPL
250696	2005 QF_{142}	—	August 30, 2005	Socorro	LINEAR	·	3.9 km	MPC · JPL
250697	2005 QY_{151}	—	August 31, 2005	Palomar	NEAT	APO +1km	930 m	MPC · JPL
250698	2005 QZ_{170}	—	August 29, 2005	Palomar	NEAT	·	2.9 km	MPC · JPL
250699	2005 QG_{172}	—	August 29, 2005	Palomar	NEAT	·	3.5 km	MPC · JPL
250700	2005 QC_{173}	—	August 29, 2005	Palomar	NEAT	EOS ·	2.6 km	MPC · JPL

== 250701–250800 ==
back to top

Designation			Discovery			Properties		Ref
Permanent	Provisional	Named after	Date	Site	Discoverer(s)	Category	Diam.	Ref
250701	2005 QQ_{176}	—	August 30, 2005	Kitt Peak	Spacewatch	KOR	1.8 km	MPC · JPL
250702	2005 QU_{176}	—	August 27, 2005	Kitt Peak	Spacewatch	KOR	1.7 km	MPC · JPL
250703	2005 QK_{177}	—	August 27, 2005	Siding Spring	SSS	·	2.8 km	MPC · JPL
250704	2005 QC_{183}	—	August 30, 2005	Campo Imperatore	CINEOS	·	2.9 km	MPC · JPL
250705	2005 QF_{189}	—	August 30, 2005	Campo Imperatore	CINEOS	KOR	1.7 km	MPC · JPL
250706	2005 RR_{6}	—	September 4, 2005	Mauna Kea	D. J. Tholen	T_{j} (2.83) · APO · PHA	540 m	MPC · JPL
250707	2005 RQ_{24}	—	September 10, 2005	Anderson Mesa	LONEOS	H	580 m	MPC · JPL
250708	2005 RJ_{30}	—	September 9, 2005	Socorro	LINEAR	·	4.1 km	MPC · JPL
250709	2005 RJ_{31}	—	September 12, 2005	Anderson Mesa	LONEOS	·	3.8 km	MPC · JPL
250710	2005 RF_{32}	—	September 13, 2005	Kitt Peak	Spacewatch	·	3.2 km	MPC · JPL
250711	2005 RZ_{33}	—	September 15, 2005	Wrightwood	J. W. Young	·	3.8 km	MPC · JPL
250712	2005 RS_{41}	—	September 14, 2005	Kitt Peak	Spacewatch	EOS	4.4 km	MPC · JPL
250713	2005 RR_{51}	—	September 1, 2005	Kitt Peak	Spacewatch	EOS	2.7 km	MPC · JPL
250714	2005 SM_{3}	—	September 23, 2005	Kitt Peak	Spacewatch	URS	5.4 km	MPC · JPL
250715	2005 SO_{7}	—	September 24, 2005	Kitt Peak	Spacewatch	·	3.0 km	MPC · JPL
250716	2005 SC_{8}	—	September 25, 2005	Catalina	CSS	·	2.7 km	MPC · JPL
250717	2005 SY_{9}	—	September 24, 2005	Anderson Mesa	LONEOS	·	3.0 km	MPC · JPL
250718	2005 SK_{12}	—	September 23, 2005	Catalina	CSS	·	5.2 km	MPC · JPL
250719 Jurajbardy	2005 SN_{21}	Jurajbardy	September 23, 2005	Ondřejov	P. Kušnirák	·	2.9 km	MPC · JPL
250720	2005 SG_{25}	—	September 26, 2005	Kitt Peak	Spacewatch	BRA	2.4 km	MPC · JPL
250721	2005 SM_{28}	—	September 23, 2005	Kitt Peak	Spacewatch	·	3.1 km	MPC · JPL
250722	2005 SN_{29}	—	September 23, 2005	Kitt Peak	Spacewatch	·	6.6 km	MPC · JPL
250723	2005 SN_{30}	—	September 23, 2005	Kitt Peak	Spacewatch	·	3.5 km	MPC · JPL
250724	2005 SJ_{40}	—	September 24, 2005	Kitt Peak	Spacewatch	·	2.1 km	MPC · JPL
250725	2005 SM_{40}	—	September 24, 2005	Kitt Peak	Spacewatch	·	3.7 km	MPC · JPL
250726	2005 SO_{45}	—	September 24, 2005	Kitt Peak	Spacewatch	·	4.3 km	MPC · JPL
250727	2005 SD_{47}	—	September 24, 2005	Kitt Peak	Spacewatch	·	2.9 km	MPC · JPL
250728	2005 SC_{52}	—	September 24, 2005	Kitt Peak	Spacewatch	·	4.5 km	MPC · JPL
250729	2005 SS_{52}	—	September 25, 2005	Kitt Peak	Spacewatch	·	3.4 km	MPC · JPL
250730	2005 SO_{64}	—	September 26, 2005	Kitt Peak	Spacewatch	KOR	1.7 km	MPC · JPL
250731	2005 SF_{65}	—	September 26, 2005	Palomar	NEAT	EOS	3.0 km	MPC · JPL
250732	2005 SO_{65}	—	September 26, 2005	Palomar	NEAT	EOS	2.6 km	MPC · JPL
250733	2005 SR_{65}	—	September 26, 2005	Palomar	NEAT	·	4.9 km	MPC · JPL
250734	2005 SO_{75}	—	September 24, 2005	Kitt Peak	Spacewatch	·	2.0 km	MPC · JPL
250735	2005 SF_{82}	—	September 24, 2005	Kitt Peak	Spacewatch	KOR	2.3 km	MPC · JPL
250736	2005 SK_{89}	—	September 24, 2005	Kitt Peak	Spacewatch	·	3.4 km	MPC · JPL
250737	2005 SK_{91}	—	September 24, 2005	Kitt Peak	Spacewatch	·	4.6 km	MPC · JPL
250738	2005 SK_{92}	—	September 24, 2005	Kitt Peak	Spacewatch	·	3.8 km	MPC · JPL
250739	2005 SN_{97}	—	September 25, 2005	Palomar	NEAT	·	2.1 km	MPC · JPL
250740	2005 SU_{111}	—	September 26, 2005	Kitt Peak	Spacewatch	·	5.0 km	MPC · JPL
250741	2005 SN_{116}	—	September 27, 2005	Palomar	NEAT	·	4.9 km	MPC · JPL
250742	2005 ST_{127}	—	September 29, 2005	Mount Lemmon	Mount Lemmon Survey	VER	3.5 km	MPC · JPL
250743	2005 SU_{137}	—	September 24, 2005	Kitt Peak	Spacewatch	·	4.8 km	MPC · JPL
250744	2005 SB_{149}	—	September 25, 2005	Kitt Peak	Spacewatch	·	2.0 km	MPC · JPL
250745	2005 SS_{159}	—	September 26, 2005	Palomar	NEAT	EOS	2.4 km	MPC · JPL
250746	2005 SO_{163}	—	September 27, 2005	Palomar	NEAT	·	6.3 km	MPC · JPL
250747	2005 SS_{169}	—	September 29, 2005	Kitt Peak	Spacewatch	·	3.4 km	MPC · JPL
250748	2005 SH_{170}	—	September 29, 2005	Kitt Peak	Spacewatch	·	4.6 km	MPC · JPL
250749	2005 SF_{172}	—	September 29, 2005	Kitt Peak	Spacewatch	·	2.9 km	MPC · JPL
250750	2005 SM_{179}	—	September 29, 2005	Anderson Mesa	LONEOS	·	3.9 km	MPC · JPL
250751	2005 SR_{192}	—	September 29, 2005	Mount Lemmon	Mount Lemmon Survey	·	3.2 km	MPC · JPL
250752	2005 SB_{205}	—	September 30, 2005	Anderson Mesa	LONEOS	·	2.9 km	MPC · JPL
250753	2005 SW_{210}	—	September 30, 2005	Palomar	NEAT	·	2.5 km	MPC · JPL
250754	2005 SG_{212}	—	September 30, 2005	Mount Lemmon	Mount Lemmon Survey	·	4.1 km	MPC · JPL
250755	2005 SG_{214}	—	September 30, 2005	Catalina	CSS	·	4.4 km	MPC · JPL
250756	2005 SC_{215}	—	September 30, 2005	Anderson Mesa	LONEOS	·	3.4 km	MPC · JPL
250757	2005 SS_{215}	—	September 30, 2005	Catalina	CSS	·	4.4 km	MPC · JPL
250758	2005 SG_{216}	—	September 30, 2005	Palomar	NEAT	·	2.9 km	MPC · JPL
250759	2005 SD_{217}	—	September 30, 2005	Mount Lemmon	Mount Lemmon Survey	·	3.9 km	MPC · JPL
250760	2005 SR_{220}	—	September 29, 2005	Catalina	CSS	·	4.5 km	MPC · JPL
250761	2005 SM_{232}	—	September 30, 2005	Mount Lemmon	Mount Lemmon Survey	·	2.6 km	MPC · JPL
250762	2005 SH_{243}	—	September 30, 2005	Catalina	CSS	H	730 m	MPC · JPL
250763	2005 SU_{252}	—	September 24, 2005	Palomar	NEAT	EOS	2.4 km	MPC · JPL
250764	2005 SZ_{254}	—	September 22, 2005	Palomar	NEAT	KOR	2.0 km	MPC · JPL
250765	2005 SR_{259}	—	September 25, 2005	Catalina	CSS	·	2.8 km	MPC · JPL
250766	2005 SQ_{262}	—	September 23, 2005	Kitt Peak	Spacewatch	·	2.2 km	MPC · JPL
250767	2005 SL_{263}	—	September 23, 2005	Kitt Peak	Spacewatch	EOS	2.5 km	MPC · JPL
250768	2005 SU_{275}	—	September 29, 2005	Kitt Peak	Spacewatch	·	1.9 km	MPC · JPL
250769	2005 SX_{279}	—	September 23, 2005	Kitt Peak	Spacewatch	·	4.6 km	MPC · JPL
250770	2005 TM_{5}	—	October 1, 2005	Catalina	CSS	·	4.4 km	MPC · JPL
250771	2005 TS_{5}	—	October 1, 2005	Catalina	CSS	·	4.2 km	MPC · JPL
250772	2005 TR_{6}	—	October 1, 2005	Catalina	CSS	·	3.0 km	MPC · JPL
250773	2005 TV_{11}	—	October 1, 2005	Mount Lemmon	Mount Lemmon Survey	·	2.9 km	MPC · JPL
250774 Syosset	2005 TX_{11}	Syosset	October 1, 2005	Catalina	CSS	·	5.7 km	MPC · JPL
250775	2005 TT_{20}	—	October 1, 2005	Mount Lemmon	Mount Lemmon Survey	·	3.1 km	MPC · JPL
250776	2005 TZ_{23}	—	October 1, 2005	Kitt Peak	Spacewatch	·	1.4 km	MPC · JPL
250777	2005 TG_{27}	—	October 1, 2005	Mount Lemmon	Mount Lemmon Survey	·	3.8 km	MPC · JPL
250778	2005 TN_{27}	—	October 1, 2005	Catalina	CSS	·	5.2 km	MPC · JPL
250779	2005 TL_{39}	—	October 1, 2005	Kitt Peak	Spacewatch	KOR	1.7 km	MPC · JPL
250780	2005 TE_{42}	—	October 3, 2005	Catalina	CSS	·	5.7 km	MPC · JPL
250781	2005 TK_{46}	—	October 1, 2005	Socorro	LINEAR	·	2.6 km	MPC · JPL
250782	2005 TU_{60}	—	October 3, 2005	Kitt Peak	Spacewatch	·	3.1 km	MPC · JPL
250783	2005 TE_{73}	—	October 5, 2005	Catalina	CSS	·	4.3 km	MPC · JPL
250784	2005 TC_{74}	—	October 7, 2005	Anderson Mesa	LONEOS	·	3.2 km	MPC · JPL
250785	2005 TP_{74}	—	October 1, 2005	Kitt Peak	Spacewatch	·	2.9 km	MPC · JPL
250786	2005 TZ_{75}	—	October 4, 2005	Palomar	NEAT	·	4.5 km	MPC · JPL
250787	2005 TA_{77}	—	October 5, 2005	Catalina	CSS	EUP	5.0 km	MPC · JPL
250788	2005 TG_{77}	—	October 6, 2005	Catalina	CSS	·	3.6 km	MPC · JPL
250789	2005 TT_{77}	—	October 6, 2005	Catalina	CSS	fast	5.7 km	MPC · JPL
250790	2005 TK_{86}	—	October 4, 2005	Catalina	CSS	·	2.9 km	MPC · JPL
250791	2005 TU_{95}	—	October 6, 2005	Catalina	CSS	EOS	2.7 km	MPC · JPL
250792	2005 TO_{101}	—	October 7, 2005	Catalina	CSS	·	5.8 km	MPC · JPL
250793	2005 TF_{118}	—	October 7, 2005	Kitt Peak	Spacewatch	KOR	1.4 km	MPC · JPL
250794	2005 TC_{129}	—	October 7, 2005	Kitt Peak	Spacewatch	·	3.4 km	MPC · JPL
250795	2005 TZ_{131}	—	October 7, 2005	Kitt Peak	Spacewatch	·	3.2 km	MPC · JPL
250796	2005 TF_{134}	—	October 10, 2005	Catalina	CSS	·	2.5 km	MPC · JPL
250797	2005 TF_{138}	—	October 7, 2005	Catalina	CSS	·	3.5 km	MPC · JPL
250798	2005 TQ_{163}	—	October 9, 2005	Kitt Peak	Spacewatch	HYG	4.2 km	MPC · JPL
250799	2005 TR_{190}	—	October 1, 2005	Mount Lemmon	Mount Lemmon Survey	·	3.2 km	MPC · JPL
250800	2005 TK_{195}	—	October 1, 2005	Kitt Peak	Spacewatch	·	3.4 km	MPC · JPL

== 250801–250900 ==
back to top

Designation			Discovery			Properties		Ref
Permanent	Provisional	Named after	Date	Site	Discoverer(s)	Category	Diam.	Ref
250801	2005 UD_{2}	—	October 22, 2005	Goodricke-Pigott	R. A. Tucker	fast	6.8 km	MPC · JPL
250802	2005 UD_{14}	—	October 22, 2005	Kitt Peak	Spacewatch	fast	3.6 km	MPC · JPL
250803	2005 UJ_{14}	—	October 22, 2005	Kitt Peak	Spacewatch	·	4.4 km	MPC · JPL
250804	2005 UL_{14}	—	October 22, 2005	Kitt Peak	Spacewatch	EOS	2.8 km	MPC · JPL
250805	2005 UY_{18}	—	October 22, 2005	Kitt Peak	Spacewatch	HYG	5.1 km	MPC · JPL
250806	2005 UG_{30}	—	October 23, 2005	Catalina	CSS	·	5.2 km	MPC · JPL
250807	2005 UW_{33}	—	October 24, 2005	Kitt Peak	Spacewatch	·	3.3 km	MPC · JPL
250808	2005 UH_{36}	—	October 24, 2005	Kitt Peak	Spacewatch	·	3.5 km	MPC · JPL
250809	2005 UB_{41}	—	October 24, 2005	Kitt Peak	Spacewatch	HYG	4.2 km	MPC · JPL
250810	2005 UX_{50}	—	October 23, 2005	Catalina	CSS	·	4.8 km	MPC · JPL
250811	2005 UJ_{51}	—	October 23, 2005	Catalina	CSS	·	3.1 km	MPC · JPL
250812	2005 UA_{54}	—	October 23, 2005	Catalina	CSS	THM	3.8 km	MPC · JPL
250813	2005 UX_{54}	—	October 23, 2005	Catalina	CSS	·	5.1 km	MPC · JPL
250814	2005 UC_{55}	—	October 23, 2005	Catalina	CSS	HYG	3.7 km	MPC · JPL
250815	2005 UB_{58}	—	October 24, 2005	Kitt Peak	Spacewatch	VER	5.5 km	MPC · JPL
250816	2005 UW_{58}	—	October 24, 2005	Kitt Peak	Spacewatch	HYG	4.5 km	MPC · JPL
250817	2005 UD_{59}	—	October 24, 2005	Kitt Peak	Spacewatch	·	5.0 km	MPC · JPL
250818	2005 UU_{67}	—	October 22, 2005	Palomar	NEAT	·	4.1 km	MPC · JPL
250819	2005 UC_{68}	—	October 22, 2005	Palomar	NEAT	·	2.7 km	MPC · JPL
250820	2005 UE_{69}	—	October 23, 2005	Palomar	NEAT	·	5.3 km	MPC · JPL
250821	2005 UF_{69}	—	October 23, 2005	Palomar	NEAT	·	4.9 km	MPC · JPL
250822	2005 UO_{69}	—	October 23, 2005	Palomar	NEAT	EOS	2.9 km	MPC · JPL
250823	2005 UF_{71}	—	October 23, 2005	Catalina	CSS	·	2.3 km	MPC · JPL
250824	2005 UM_{71}	—	October 23, 2005	Catalina	CSS	·	4.2 km	MPC · JPL
250825	2005 UV_{72}	—	October 23, 2005	Palomar	NEAT	·	3.1 km	MPC · JPL
250826	2005 UQ_{74}	—	October 23, 2005	Palomar	NEAT	·	3.2 km	MPC · JPL
250827	2005 US_{74}	—	October 23, 2005	Palomar	NEAT	·	4.2 km	MPC · JPL
250828	2005 UH_{77}	—	October 24, 2005	Palomar	NEAT	·	4.2 km	MPC · JPL
250829	2005 UE_{85}	—	October 22, 2005	Kitt Peak	Spacewatch	·	3.7 km	MPC · JPL
250830	2005 UZ_{90}	—	October 22, 2005	Kitt Peak	Spacewatch	·	2.6 km	MPC · JPL
250831	2005 UT_{95}	—	October 22, 2005	Kitt Peak	Spacewatch	THM	2.7 km	MPC · JPL
250832	2005 UE_{121}	—	October 24, 2005	Kitt Peak	Spacewatch	·	3.0 km	MPC · JPL
250833	2005 UQ_{131}	—	October 24, 2005	Palomar	NEAT	·	3.5 km	MPC · JPL
250834	2005 US_{140}	—	October 25, 2005	Mount Lemmon	Mount Lemmon Survey	·	2.7 km	MPC · JPL
250835	2005 UW_{140}	—	October 25, 2005	Mount Lemmon	Mount Lemmon Survey	EOS	2.9 km	MPC · JPL
250836	2005 UG_{142}	—	October 25, 2005	Catalina	CSS	·	5.6 km	MPC · JPL
250837	2005 UW_{143}	—	October 26, 2005	Kitt Peak	Spacewatch	·	1.9 km	MPC · JPL
250838	2005 UG_{144}	—	October 26, 2005	Anderson Mesa	LONEOS	·	4.1 km	MPC · JPL
250839	2005 UC_{149}	—	October 26, 2005	Kitt Peak	Spacewatch	·	3.5 km	MPC · JPL
250840 Motörhead	2005 UT_{158}	Motörhead	October 30, 2005	Nogales	J.-C. Merlin	HYG	3.2 km	MPC · JPL
250841	2005 UV_{162}	—	October 23, 2005	Kitt Peak	Spacewatch	·	4.9 km	MPC · JPL
250842	2005 UG_{169}	—	October 24, 2005	Kitt Peak	Spacewatch	HYG	4.1 km	MPC · JPL
250843	2005 UL_{175}	—	October 24, 2005	Kitt Peak	Spacewatch	HYG	5.1 km	MPC · JPL
250844	2005 UX_{182}	—	October 24, 2005	Kitt Peak	Spacewatch	·	4.9 km	MPC · JPL
250845	2005 UK_{190}	—	October 27, 2005	Mount Lemmon	Mount Lemmon Survey	·	4.9 km	MPC · JPL
250846	2005 UK_{196}	—	October 24, 2005	Kitt Peak	Spacewatch	THM	2.9 km	MPC · JPL
250847	2005 UF_{197}	—	October 24, 2005	Kitt Peak	Spacewatch	·	5.2 km	MPC · JPL
250848	2005 UK_{198}	—	October 25, 2005	Mount Lemmon	Mount Lemmon Survey	·	2.9 km	MPC · JPL
250849	2005 UB_{216}	—	October 25, 2005	Kitt Peak	Spacewatch	·	3.8 km	MPC · JPL
250850	2005 UW_{216}	—	October 26, 2005	Kitt Peak	Spacewatch	·	4.2 km	MPC · JPL
250851	2005 UR_{219}	—	October 25, 2005	Kitt Peak	Spacewatch	·	2.9 km	MPC · JPL
250852	2005 UU_{244}	—	October 25, 2005	Kitt Peak	Spacewatch	HYG	3.3 km	MPC · JPL
250853	2005 UQ_{248}	—	October 28, 2005	Mount Lemmon	Mount Lemmon Survey	CYB	3.5 km	MPC · JPL
250854	2005 UO_{257}	—	October 25, 2005	Kitt Peak	Spacewatch	·	5.1 km	MPC · JPL
250855	2005 UL_{263}	—	October 27, 2005	Kitt Peak	Spacewatch	·	5.7 km	MPC · JPL
250856	2005 UY_{273}	—	October 24, 2005	Palomar	NEAT	·	6.1 km	MPC · JPL
250857	2005 UA_{285}	—	October 26, 2005	Kitt Peak	Spacewatch	·	6.0 km	MPC · JPL
250858	2005 UE_{292}	—	October 26, 2005	Kitt Peak	Spacewatch	·	4.4 km	MPC · JPL
250859	2005 UG_{293}	—	October 26, 2005	Kitt Peak	Spacewatch	·	6.2 km	MPC · JPL
250860	2005 UW_{314}	—	October 24, 2005	Kitt Peak	Spacewatch	·	5.7 km	MPC · JPL
250861	2005 UM_{316}	—	October 25, 2005	Kitt Peak	Spacewatch	·	4.0 km	MPC · JPL
250862	2005 UR_{318}	—	October 27, 2005	Kitt Peak	Spacewatch	·	4.1 km	MPC · JPL
250863	2005 UK_{329}	—	October 28, 2005	Mount Lemmon	Mount Lemmon Survey	·	1.9 km	MPC · JPL
250864	2005 UJ_{340}	—	October 31, 2005	Kitt Peak	Spacewatch	·	4.1 km	MPC · JPL
250865	2005 UR_{348}	—	October 23, 2005	Catalina	CSS	·	4.7 km	MPC · JPL
250866	2005 UM_{351}	—	October 29, 2005	Catalina	CSS	EOS	3.0 km	MPC · JPL
250867	2005 UZ_{381}	—	October 25, 2005	Socorro	LINEAR	·	6.1 km	MPC · JPL
250868	2005 UY_{388}	—	October 27, 2005	Anderson Mesa	LONEOS	·	3.6 km	MPC · JPL
250869	2005 UD_{400}	—	October 26, 2005	Kitt Peak	Spacewatch	·	4.8 km	MPC · JPL
250870	2005 UX_{412}	—	October 31, 2005	Mount Lemmon	Mount Lemmon Survey	THM	2.6 km	MPC · JPL
250871	2005 UA_{431}	—	October 28, 2005	Kitt Peak	Spacewatch	HYG	3.5 km	MPC · JPL
250872	2005 UY_{439}	—	October 29, 2005	Catalina	CSS	·	2.5 km	MPC · JPL
250873	2005 UK_{441}	—	October 29, 2005	Catalina	CSS	EOS	3.4 km	MPC · JPL
250874	2005 UM_{444}	—	October 30, 2005	Mount Lemmon	Mount Lemmon Survey	·	3.1 km	MPC · JPL
250875	2005 UJ_{454}	—	October 23, 2005	Catalina	CSS	EOS	3.0 km	MPC · JPL
250876	2005 UM_{478}	—	October 27, 2005	Anderson Mesa	LONEOS	·	5.2 km	MPC · JPL
250877	2005 UH_{479}	—	October 29, 2005	Kitt Peak	Spacewatch	·	3.4 km	MPC · JPL
250878	2005 UF_{480}	—	October 30, 2005	Catalina	CSS	·	6.4 km	MPC · JPL
250879	2005 UK_{481}	—	October 30, 2005	Catalina	CSS	·	2.2 km	MPC · JPL
250880	2005 UJ_{488}	—	October 23, 2005	Catalina	CSS	EOS	2.9 km	MPC · JPL
250881	2005 UK_{489}	—	October 23, 2005	Catalina	CSS	EOS	3.5 km	MPC · JPL
250882	2005 UN_{489}	—	October 23, 2005	Catalina	CSS	·	5.8 km	MPC · JPL
250883	2005 UZ_{501}	—	October 28, 2005	Catalina	CSS	EOS ·	4.6 km	MPC · JPL
250884	2005 UQ_{508}	—	October 29, 2005	Catalina	CSS	·	4.0 km	MPC · JPL
250885	2005 UG_{513}	—	October 23, 2005	Catalina	CSS	·	4.5 km	MPC · JPL
250886	2005 UA_{516}	—	October 22, 2005	Apache Point	A. C. Becker	·	4.6 km	MPC · JPL
250887	2005 UZ_{517}	—	October 25, 2005	Apache Point	A. C. Becker	·	4.8 km	MPC · JPL
250888	2005 VJ_{30}	—	November 4, 2005	Kitt Peak	Spacewatch	LIX	4.4 km	MPC · JPL
250889	2005 VF_{32}	—	November 4, 2005	Kitt Peak	Spacewatch	·	3.5 km	MPC · JPL
250890	2005 VN_{37}	—	November 3, 2005	Socorro	LINEAR	·	3.4 km	MPC · JPL
250891	2005 VL_{42}	—	November 3, 2005	Socorro	LINEAR	·	4.8 km	MPC · JPL
250892	2005 VT_{58}	—	November 5, 2005	Kitt Peak	Spacewatch	(43176) ·	6.2 km	MPC · JPL
250893	2005 VK_{61}	—	November 5, 2005	Socorro	LINEAR	·	5.8 km	MPC · JPL
250894	2005 VL_{72}	—	November 1, 2005	Mount Lemmon	Mount Lemmon Survey	THM	3.7 km	MPC · JPL
250895	2005 VT_{75}	—	November 2, 2005	Socorro	LINEAR	·	4.9 km	MPC · JPL
250896	2005 VL_{77}	—	November 5, 2005	Kitt Peak	Spacewatch	HYG	4.6 km	MPC · JPL
250897	2005 VU_{80}	—	November 5, 2005	Socorro	LINEAR	·	5.5 km	MPC · JPL
250898	2005 VL_{82}	—	November 13, 2005	Socorro	LINEAR	·	5.4 km	MPC · JPL
250899	2005 VP_{86}	—	November 5, 2005	Kitt Peak	Spacewatch	·	3.7 km	MPC · JPL
250900	2005 VY_{97}	—	November 5, 2005	Catalina	CSS	·	5.6 km	MPC · JPL

== 250901–251000 ==
back to top

Designation			Discovery			Properties		Ref
Permanent	Provisional	Named after	Date	Site	Discoverer(s)	Category	Diam.	Ref
250901	2005 VX_{101}	—	November 1, 2005	Socorro	LINEAR	·	3.1 km	MPC · JPL
250902	2005 VB_{103}	—	November 2, 2005	Catalina	CSS	·	5.4 km	MPC · JPL
250903	2005 VD_{103}	—	November 2, 2005	Socorro	LINEAR	·	6.0 km	MPC · JPL
250904	2005 VB_{111}	—	November 6, 2005	Mount Lemmon	Mount Lemmon Survey	·	3.1 km	MPC · JPL
250905	2005 VZ_{130}	—	November 1, 2005	Apache Point	A. C. Becker	·	4.5 km	MPC · JPL
250906	2005 VB_{135}	—	November 10, 2005	Catalina	CSS	·	5.4 km	MPC · JPL
250907	2005 WK	—	November 19, 2005	Wrightwood	J. W. Young	·	2.6 km	MPC · JPL
250908	2005 WK_{2}	—	November 22, 2005	Socorro	LINEAR	·	5.3 km	MPC · JPL
250909	2005 WO_{2}	—	November 22, 2005	Socorro	LINEAR	·	4.4 km	MPC · JPL
250910	2005 WC_{4}	—	November 21, 2005	Catalina	CSS	·	2.6 km	MPC · JPL
250911	2005 WR_{5}	—	November 21, 2005	Anderson Mesa	LONEOS	·	4.7 km	MPC · JPL
250912	2005 WJ_{6}	—	November 21, 2005	Catalina	CSS	·	5.1 km	MPC · JPL
250913	2005 WL_{6}	—	November 21, 2005	Catalina	CSS	THM	2.9 km	MPC · JPL
250914	2005 WU_{6}	—	November 21, 2005	Catalina	CSS	THM	3.0 km	MPC · JPL
250915	2005 WO_{7}	—	November 21, 2005	Kitt Peak	Spacewatch	·	3.6 km	MPC · JPL
250916	2005 WT_{8}	—	November 21, 2005	Kitt Peak	Spacewatch	THM	2.9 km	MPC · JPL
250917	2005 WS_{13}	—	November 22, 2005	Kitt Peak	Spacewatch	·	4.5 km	MPC · JPL
250918	2005 WT_{17}	—	November 22, 2005	Kitt Peak	Spacewatch	·	3.5 km	MPC · JPL
250919	2005 WV_{25}	—	November 21, 2005	Kitt Peak	Spacewatch	·	4.2 km	MPC · JPL
250920	2005 WW_{27}	—	November 21, 2005	Kitt Peak	Spacewatch	·	4.9 km	MPC · JPL
250921	2005 WH_{34}	—	November 21, 2005	Catalina	CSS	·	4.8 km	MPC · JPL
250922	2005 WH_{47}	—	November 25, 2005	Kitt Peak	Spacewatch	·	3.8 km	MPC · JPL
250923	2005 WH_{55}	—	November 25, 2005	Kitt Peak	Spacewatch	·	5.4 km	MPC · JPL
250924	2005 WC_{72}	—	November 22, 2005	Catalina	CSS	·	3.8 km	MPC · JPL
250925	2005 WN_{72}	—	November 25, 2005	Catalina	CSS	·	5.2 km	MPC · JPL
250926	2005 WA_{74}	—	November 26, 2005	Catalina	CSS	THB	3.7 km	MPC · JPL
250927	2005 WQ_{105}	—	November 29, 2005	Socorro	LINEAR	·	2.1 km	MPC · JPL
250928	2005 WR_{114}	—	November 28, 2005	Catalina	CSS	·	4.9 km	MPC · JPL
250929	2005 WK_{117}	—	November 28, 2005	Socorro	LINEAR	·	7.1 km	MPC · JPL
250930	2005 WK_{118}	—	November 28, 2005	Catalina	CSS	·	5.6 km	MPC · JPL
250931	2005 WF_{122}	—	November 30, 2005	Mount Lemmon	Mount Lemmon Survey	H	890 m	MPC · JPL
250932	2005 WO_{124}	—	November 25, 2005	Catalina	CSS	·	4.5 km	MPC · JPL
250933	2005 WD_{184}	—	November 28, 2005	Catalina	CSS	EOS	3.2 km	MPC · JPL
250934	2005 WO_{192}	—	November 25, 2005	Catalina	CSS	·	4.7 km	MPC · JPL
250935	2005 WW_{194}	—	November 30, 2005	Anderson Mesa	LONEOS	T_{j} (2.98) · EUP	6.4 km	MPC · JPL
250936	2005 XS_{5}	—	December 1, 2005	Socorro	LINEAR	THM	3.2 km	MPC · JPL
250937	2005 XE_{22}	—	December 2, 2005	Socorro	LINEAR	·	4.0 km	MPC · JPL
250938	2005 XB_{58}	—	December 2, 2005	Kitt Peak	Spacewatch	·	3.9 km	MPC · JPL
250939	2005 XZ_{64}	—	December 7, 2005	Catalina	CSS	·	4.0 km	MPC · JPL
250940	2005 XN_{84}	—	December 9, 2005	Socorro	LINEAR	THM	3.6 km	MPC · JPL
250941	2005 XP_{92}	—	December 10, 2005	Catalina	CSS	·	6.7 km	MPC · JPL
250942	2005 YC_{123}	—	December 24, 2005	Socorro	LINEAR	(69559)	6.2 km	MPC · JPL
250943	2005 YK_{124}	—	December 26, 2005	Kitt Peak	Spacewatch	·	4.1 km	MPC · JPL
250944	2005 YK_{211}	—	December 27, 2005	Catalina	CSS	H	710 m	MPC · JPL
250945	2005 YP_{214}	—	December 30, 2005	Catalina	CSS	·	4.3 km	MPC · JPL
250946	2005 YD_{282}	—	December 26, 2005	Mount Lemmon	Mount Lemmon Survey	·	3.0 km	MPC · JPL
250947	2005 YB_{287}	—	December 28, 2005	Junk Bond	D. Healy	·	6.5 km	MPC · JPL
250948	2006 BD_{39}	—	January 24, 2006	Socorro	LINEAR	·	4.7 km	MPC · JPL
250949	2006 BT_{55}	—	January 27, 2006	Mayhill	Lowe, A.	H	600 m	MPC · JPL
250950	2006 BH_{126}	—	January 26, 2006	Kitt Peak	Spacewatch	·	710 m	MPC · JPL
250951	2006 BX_{256}	—	January 31, 2006	Kitt Peak	Spacewatch	MAS	840 m	MPC · JPL
250952	2006 BA_{267}	—	January 26, 2006	Anderson Mesa	LONEOS	·	3.5 km	MPC · JPL
250953	2006 BL_{275}	—	January 31, 2006	Mount Lemmon	Mount Lemmon Survey	·	1.0 km	MPC · JPL
250954	2006 CJ_{8}	—	February 1, 2006	Mount Lemmon	Mount Lemmon Survey	·	1.4 km	MPC · JPL
250955 Sorena	2006 CF_{68}	Sorena	February 3, 2006	Mount Lemmon	Mount Lemmon Survey	CYB	4.9 km	MPC · JPL
250956	2006 DO_{7}	—	February 20, 2006	Catalina	CSS	·	1.4 km	MPC · JPL
250957	2006 DX_{40}	—	February 22, 2006	Catalina	CSS	PHO	1.2 km	MPC · JPL
250958	2006 DX_{41}	—	February 23, 2006	Anderson Mesa	LONEOS	·	1.2 km	MPC · JPL
250959	2006 DZ_{46}	—	February 20, 2006	Mount Lemmon	Mount Lemmon Survey	·	770 m	MPC · JPL
250960	2006 DB_{60}	—	February 24, 2006	Kitt Peak	Spacewatch	·	840 m	MPC · JPL
250961	2006 DW_{96}	—	February 24, 2006	Kitt Peak	Spacewatch	·	870 m	MPC · JPL
250962	2006 DU_{106}	—	February 25, 2006	Kitt Peak	Spacewatch	3:2	7.0 km	MPC · JPL
250963	2006 DX_{180}	—	February 27, 2006	Kitt Peak	Spacewatch	·	890 m	MPC · JPL
250964	2006 DJ_{197}	—	February 24, 2006	Catalina	CSS	·	1.1 km	MPC · JPL
250965	2006 EY_{38}	—	March 4, 2006	Catalina	CSS	·	970 m	MPC · JPL
250966	2006 FG_{7}	—	March 23, 2006	Kitt Peak	Spacewatch	·	1.1 km	MPC · JPL
250967	2006 FN_{45}	—	March 24, 2006	Socorro	LINEAR	·	840 m	MPC · JPL
250968	2006 GM_{26}	—	April 2, 2006	Kitt Peak	Spacewatch	·	1.1 km	MPC · JPL
250969	2006 HF_{26}	—	April 20, 2006	Kitt Peak	Spacewatch	·	1.0 km	MPC · JPL
250970	2006 HQ_{35}	—	April 19, 2006	Catalina	CSS	·	870 m	MPC · JPL
250971	2006 HV_{39}	—	April 21, 2006	Socorro	LINEAR	·	1.1 km	MPC · JPL
250972	2006 HA_{60}	—	April 25, 2006	Catalina	CSS	PHO	1.2 km	MPC · JPL
250973	2006 HN_{70}	—	April 25, 2006	Kitt Peak	Spacewatch	·	910 m	MPC · JPL
250974	2006 HC_{83}	—	April 26, 2006	Kitt Peak	Spacewatch	·	770 m	MPC · JPL
250975	2006 HH_{92}	—	April 29, 2006	Kitt Peak	Spacewatch	·	1.0 km	MPC · JPL
250976	2006 HV_{101}	—	April 30, 2006	Kitt Peak	Spacewatch	·	1.4 km	MPC · JPL
250977	2006 HT_{111}	—	April 29, 2006	Siding Spring	SSS	·	1.2 km	MPC · JPL
250978	2006 JL_{25}	—	May 5, 2006	Mount Lemmon	Mount Lemmon Survey	·	1.3 km	MPC · JPL
250979	2006 JB_{31}	—	May 3, 2006	Kitt Peak	Spacewatch	·	970 m	MPC · JPL
250980	2006 JM_{35}	—	May 4, 2006	Kitt Peak	Spacewatch	·	880 m	MPC · JPL
250981	2006 JC_{47}	—	May 10, 2006	Palomar	NEAT	·	1.2 km	MPC · JPL
250982	2006 JX_{57}	—	May 8, 2006	Siding Spring	SSS	·	1.5 km	MPC · JPL
250983	2006 KE_{1}	—	May 18, 2006	Palomar	NEAT	·	1.5 km	MPC · JPL
250984	2006 KC_{17}	—	May 20, 2006	Catalina	CSS	·	930 m	MPC · JPL
250985	2006 KO_{19}	—	May 22, 2006	Mount Lemmon	Mount Lemmon Survey	·	760 m	MPC · JPL
250986	2006 KG_{20}	—	May 20, 2006	Catalina	CSS	·	1.2 km	MPC · JPL
250987	2006 KH_{28}	—	May 20, 2006	Kitt Peak	Spacewatch	·	1.0 km	MPC · JPL
250988	2006 KK_{31}	—	May 20, 2006	Kitt Peak	Spacewatch	·	870 m	MPC · JPL
250989	2006 KX_{40}	—	May 19, 2006	Mount Lemmon	Mount Lemmon Survey	·	1.1 km	MPC · JPL
250990	2006 KH_{51}	—	May 21, 2006	Mount Lemmon	Mount Lemmon Survey	·	830 m	MPC · JPL
250991	2006 KG_{54}	—	May 21, 2006	Kitt Peak	Spacewatch	·	2.9 km	MPC · JPL
250992	2006 KK_{76}	—	May 24, 2006	Mount Lemmon	Mount Lemmon Survey	·	880 m	MPC · JPL
250993	2006 KH_{122}	—	May 28, 2006	Socorro	LINEAR	·	1.6 km	MPC · JPL
250994	2006 MR_{5}	—	June 17, 2006	Kitt Peak	Spacewatch	·	1.5 km	MPC · JPL
250995	2006 MO_{9}	—	June 19, 2006	Kitt Peak	Spacewatch	·	1.8 km	MPC · JPL
250996	2006 MK_{11}	—	June 21, 2006	Kitt Peak	Spacewatch	·	1.8 km	MPC · JPL
250997	2006 MW_{11}	—	June 19, 2006	Kitt Peak	Spacewatch	·	980 m	MPC · JPL
250998	2006 OY_{7}	—	July 19, 2006	Palomar	NEAT	NYS	1.7 km	MPC · JPL
250999	2006 OQ_{12}	—	July 18, 2006	Siding Spring	SSS	PHO	3.1 km	MPC · JPL
251000	2006 OY_{13}	—	July 20, 2006	Palomar	NEAT	·	1.4 km	MPC · JPL

back to top

== See also ==
- Meanings of minor-planet names: 250001–251000
