= Meanings of minor-planet names: 250001–251000 =

As minor planet discoveries are confirmed, they are given a permanent number by the IAU's Minor Planet Center (MPC), and the discoverers can then submit names for them, following the IAU's naming conventions. The list below concerns those minor planets in the specified number-range that have received names, and explains the meanings of those names.

Official naming citations of newly named small Solar System bodies are approved and published in a bulletin by IAU's Working Group for Small Bodies Nomenclature (WGSBN). Before May 2021, citations were published in MPC's Minor Planet Circulars for many decades. Recent citations can also be found on the JPL Small-Body Database (SBDB). Until his death in 2016, German astronomer Lutz D. Schmadel compiled these citations into the Dictionary of Minor Planet Names (DMP) and regularly updated the collection.

Based on Paul Herget's The Names of the Minor Planets, Schmadel also researched the unclear origin of numerous asteroids, most of which had been named prior to World War II. This article incorporates text from this source, which is in the public domain: SBDB New namings may only be added to this list below after official publication as the preannouncement of names is condemned. The WGSBN publishes a comprehensive guideline for the naming rules of non-cometary small Solar System bodies.

== 250001–250100 ==
Named minor planet	Provisional	This minor planet was named for...	Ref · Catalog
There are no named minor planets in this number range

== 250101–250200 ==
back to top

Named minor planet	Provisional	This minor planet was named for...	Ref · Catalog
250164 Hannsruder	2002 TM_{69}	Hanns Ruder (1939–2015), a German professor of astrophysics at the University of Tübingen	JPL · 250164

== 250201–250300 ==
back to top

Named minor planet	Provisional	This minor planet was named for...	Ref · Catalog
There are no named minor planets in this number range

== 250301–250400 ==
back to top

Named minor planet	Provisional	This minor planet was named for...	Ref · Catalog
250354 Lewicdeparis	2003 SP_{244}	The WIC de Paris (Women International Club), welcomes women of all nationalities living in and around Paris and provides them a friendly environment for sharing cultures.	JPL · 250354
250370 Obertocitterio	2003 TK_{4}	Oberto Citterio (born 1933) is an astronomer at the Italian National Institute for Astrophysics. He has made important contributions in the field of astronomical optics and instrumentation from infrared to γ-rays, with particular reference to the X-ray optics technology used for many space projects.	IAU · 250370
250374 Jírovec	2003 UL_{4}	Vojtěch Matyáš Jírovec (1763–1850), also known as Adalbert Gyrowetz, was a Bohemian composer born in České Budějovice.	JPL · 250374

== 250401–250500 ==
back to top

Named minor planet	Provisional	This minor planet was named for...	Ref · Catalog
There are no named minor planets in this number range

== 250501–250600 ==
back to top

Named minor planet	Provisional	This minor planet was named for...	Ref · Catalog
250526 Steinerzsuzsanna	2004 PO_{42}	Zsuzsanna Steiner (1927–2012), a Hungarian physics and mathematics teacher	JPL · 250526

== 250601–250700 ==
back to top

Named minor planet	Provisional	This minor planet was named for...	Ref · Catalog
250606 Bichat	2005 EL_{222}	Xavier Bichat (1771–1802), an anatomist and pathologist	JPL · 250606

== 250701–250800 ==
back to top

Named minor planet	Provisional	This minor planet was named for...	Ref · Catalog
250719 Jurajbardy	2005 SN_{21}	Juraj Bardy (1919–2011) was a Slovak amateur astronomer and secondary school teacher who taught at the Gymnasium in Považská Bystrica. As an enthusiastic popularizer of astronomy, he contributed to its development in the region. He was the designer of the Považská Bystrica sundial.	JPL · 250719
250774 Syosset	2005 TX_{11}	Syosset is a hamlet on Long Island, New York. Originally colonized by Dutch settlers in the 1600s, it became a well populated, suburban town after World War II. The discoverer was born in Syosset.	JPL · 250774

== 250801–250900 ==
back to top

Named minor planet	Provisional	This minor planet was named for...	Ref · Catalog
250840 Motörhead	2005 UT_{158}	Motörhead, a British heavy metal group established in 1975	JPL · 250840

== 250901–251000 ==
back to top

Named minor planet	Provisional	This minor planet was named for...	Ref · Catalog
250955 Sorena	2006 CF_{68}	Sorena Svea Sorensen, American geologist.	IAU · 250955

back to top

Preceded by 249,001–250,000	Meanings of minor-planet names List of minor planets: 250,001–251,000	Succeeded by 251,001–252,000
